= List of A.D. Isidro Metapan records and statistics =

This page details Isidro Metapán records.

== Honours ==
=== Domestic competitions ===
- Primera División
- Winner (10): Clausura 2007, Apertura 2008, Clausura 2009, Clausura 2010, Apertura 2010, Apertura 2011, Apertura 2012, Apertura 2013, Clausura 2014, Apertura 2014
- Liga de Ascenso
- Winner (1): 2000–01

== Player records ==
=== Appearances ===
==== Youngest ====
- Youngest first-team player – TBD, - years - days (v. TBD, TBD, TBD)
- Youngest first-team player in the First Division – TBD, - years - days (v. TBD, Premier League, TBD)
- Youngest first-team player in an Official Concacaf Competition – TBD, - years - days (v. TBD, TBD, TBD)

==== Oldest ====
- Oldest first-team player – TBD, - years - days (v. TBD, TBD, TBD)
- Oldest first-team player in the First Division - TBD, - years - days (v. TBD, TBD)
- Oldest first-team player in an Official Concacaf competition – TBD, - years - days (v. TBD, TBD, TBD)
- Oldest first-team debutant – TBD, - years - days (v. TBD, TBD, TBD)

==== Most Number of Appearances ====
Competitive, professional matches only including substitution, number of appearances as a substitute appears in brackets.

Last updated -

	Name	Years	Primera División	Finals	CCL	Total
1	(El Salvador) Hector Omar Mejia	2000-2015	483 (19)	(-)	43 (0)	519 (19)
2	(El Salvador) Milton Molina	2010-	366 (18)	(-)	(-)	(-)
3	(El Salvador) Alexander Escobar	2001-2012	318 (31)	(-)	(-)	(-)
4	(Uruguay) Paolo Suarez	2010-2013, 2018	295 (69)	(-)	20 (4)	315 (73)
5	(El Salvador) -	-	(-)	(-)	(-)	(-)
6	(El Salvador) -	-	(-)	(-)	(-)	(-)
7	(El Salvador) Marvin Monterrosa	2011-2016	201 (33)	(-)	(-)	(-)
7	(El Salvador) Oscar Pleitez	2014–present	200 (0)	(-)	(-)	(-)
8	(Honduras) Ernesto Noel Aquino	2008-2013	200 (0)	(-)	(-)	(-)
9	(El Salvador) Narciso Orellana	2013-2016	174 (5)	(-)	(-)	(-)
10	(El Salvador) Christian Alexander Sánchez	2012-2016	167 (20)	(-)	(-)	(-)

- Current player with most appearances – Milton Molina, 366 (18), as of 2010
- Most consecutive appearances – TBA, - (TBD – TBD)
- Most separate spells with the club - TBD, - (TBA)

=== Concacaf appearances ===
As of 22 October 2024 (October2011)

#	Name	Apps	Years
1	(El Salvador) Héctor Mejía	43	2000 – 2015
2	(Honduras) (El Salvador) Ernesto Aquino	27	2008 – 2013
3	(El Salvador) Milton Molina	23	2010 – Present
5	(Uruguay) Paolo Suárez	20	2005–2006, 2007– 2012, 2015-2018
3	(El Salvador) Alexander Escobar	18	2001 – 2012
5	(El Salvador) Andrés Flores	17	2009–2011, 2013-2014
7	(El Salvador) Mario Aguilar	12	2001 – 2012
8	(El Salvador) Henry Hernandez	12	2012-2015
9	(El Salvador) Jorge Morán	11	2008 – 2012
10	(Panama) Nicolás Muñoz	11	2011 – 2014, 2018-2019
11	(El Salvador) Alfredo Pacheco	10	2011-2012
12	(El Salvador) Álvaro Misael Alfaro	9	2006–2008, 2009–2010
13	(El Salvador) Edwin Sánchez	9	2011 – 2012

=== Goalscorers ===
==== In a season ====
- Most goals in a season – 14, Williams Reyes (-)
- Most League goals in a season – ?, TBD, (TBD)
- Most Primera Division goals in a season 14, Williams Reyes, (TBD)

==== In a single match ====
- Most goals in a single match – ?, TBD (v. TBD, TBD, )
- Most goals in a single match at home – ?, TBD (v. TBD, TBD, date unknown)
- Most goals in a single First Division away match - 4 TBD (v. TBD, date Unknown)
- Most goals in a Concacaf competition match – 3 Nicolás Muñoz (v. Puerto Rico Islanders, CONCACAF Champions League, August 2, 2012)
- Fastest recorded goal – ? seconds, TBD (v. TBD, TBD, )
- Fastest recorded goal in a First Division Match – 24 seconds, Spaniard Gregori Diaz (v. C.D. Platense Municipal Zacatecoluca, 3 April 2022)

==== Youngest and oldest ====
- Youngest goalscorer – TBD, - years - days (v. TBD, TBD, )
- Youngest goalscorer in the league – TBD, - years - days (v. TBD, TBD, )
- Youngest goalscorer in a Concacaf Competition – Edwin Sanchez, 21 years 156 days (v. Puerto Rico Islanders, 2011–12 CONCACAF Champions League preliminary round, July 27, 2011 )
- Youngest hat-trick scorer – TBD, - years - days (v. TBD, TBD, )
- Oldest goalscorer – TBD, - years - days (v. TBD, TBD, TBD)
- Oldest goalscorer in a Concacaf Competition – Elias Montes, 35 years 65 days (v. Houston Dynamo, 2009–10 CONCACAF Champions League Group Stage, October 21, 2009)

==== Leading Scorers ====
Last updated -

Competitive, professional matches only, appearances including substitutes appear in brackets.

	Name	Years	Primera División	Finals	CCL	Total
1	(El Salvador) Williams Reyes	2005–2009	76 (-)	(-)	1 (3)	(-)
2	(Uruguay) Paolo Suarez	2007, 2010–2013, 2018-2019	72 (295)	(-)	4(20)	(-)
3	(Panama) Nicolás Muñoz	2012-2014	53 (-)	(-)	10 (11)	(-)
4	(El Salvador) Lester Blanco	2010-2013	32 (-)	(-)	(-)	(-)
5	(Puerto Rico) Héctor Ramos	2013-2015	32 (79)	(-)	2 (4)	(-)
6	(Panama) Anel Canales	2009-2011	31 (56)	(-)	2 (7)	(-)
7	(El Salvador) Alexander Escobar	2001-2012	31 ()	(31)	(-)	(-)
8	(El Salvador) -	-	(-)	(-)	(-)	(-)
9	(El Salvador) Erick Prado	-	29 (-)	(-)	(-)	(-)
10	(El Salvador) -	-	(-)	(-)	(-)	(-)
TBD	(El Salvador) Marvin Monterrosa	2010-2017	32 (-)	(-)	(-)	(-)
TBD	(El Salvador) Omar Mejía	2000-2015	19 (476)	(-)	(-)	(-)
TBD	(El Salvador) Milton Molina	2010–present	20 (-)	(-)	(-)	(-)

==== Concacaf scorers ====
As of 21 October 2011

	Name	Goals	Apps	Ave.
1	(Panama) Nicolás Muñoz	10	7	3
2	(Uruguay) Paolo Suárez	4	16	0.307
3	(Brazil) Allan Kardeck	3	7	0.5
4	(El Salvador) Léster Blanco	3	9	0.33
5	(Panama) Anel Canales	2	7	0.28
6	(Puerto Rico) Hector Ramos	2	4	0.5
7	(El Salvador) David Rugamas	2	4	0.5
8	(Paraguay) Gabriel Garcete	1	2	0.5
9	(El Salvador) (Honduras) Williams Reyes	1	3	0.333
10	(El Salvador) Elías Montes	1	3	0.333
11	(El Salvador) Edwin Sánchez	1	9	0.125

== Club Records ==
- Record Victory: 6-0 vs San Salvador F.C., October 27, 2007
- Record Defeat: 1-7 vs Alianza F.C., 22 March 2010
- Biggest Victory at home in a Primera Division game: 6-0 vs San Salvador F.C., October 27, 2007
- Biggest Defeat at home in a Primera Division game: 0-2 vs C.D. FAS, TBD, 2002 and 0-2 vs Firpo, TBD, 2002 and 0-2 vs Atlético Balboa, TBD, 2004
- Biggest Victory away in a Primera Division game: 3-0 vs Atlético Marte, TBD, 2003 and 4-1 vs San Salvador F.C., September 2, 2004
- Biggest Defeat away in a Primera Division game: 1-7 vs Alianza F.C., 22 March 2010
- Record Victory in a Concacaf Competition: 4-0 ( Home vs Los Angeles Galaxy, 24 October 2013)
- Record Defeat in a Concacaf Competition: 0-8 (twice; Away vs UNAM Pumas, 15 March 2012)
- Record High Attendance: 27,750 (v. Aguila, Apertura 2014, December 2014)
- Record Attendance for a Primera Division Match: 27,750 (v. Aguila, Apertura 2014, December 2014)
- Record Attendance for a Concacaf competition Match (Home): 4,000 (v. Santos Laguna, Concacaf Champions League, 25 August 2011)

=== Streaks ===
- Most Wins in a Row:
- Most Draws in a Row:
- Most Loses in a Row:
- Most games Undefeated: 23 ( to April 22, 2012)

==== International level ====
- As of 16 November 2015

Opponent	First meeting	Last Meeting	Pld	W	D	L	GF	GA	GD
(Costa Rica) Alajuelense	9 August 2007	14 August 2007	2	0	1	1	0	3	−3
(Panama) Árabe Unido	15 September 2009	29 September 2009	2	0	0	2	0	7	−7
(Costa Rica) Cartagines	8 August 2013	27 August 2013	2	0	1	1	2	4	−2
(Mexico) Chiapas F.C.	30 December 2011	30 December 2011	1	0	0	1	1	4	-3
(Mexico) Club Leon	August 5, 2014	23 October 2014	2	0	0	2	3	8	-5
(United States) Colorado Rapids	17 August 2011	28 August 2011	2	0	0	2	3	6	−3
(Costa Rica) Herediano	21 August 2014	17 September 2015	4	1	0	3	4	11	−7
(United States) Houston Dynamo	19 August 2009	21 October 2009	2	1	0	1	3	3	0
(United States) Los Angeles Galaxy	23 August 2012	25 October 2013	4	1	0	3	8	9	−1
(Honduras) C.D. Marathón	27 August 2008	3 September 2008	2	0	1	1	3	4	−1
(Mexico) Pachuca F.C.	25 August 2009	22 September 2009	2	0	0	2	0	9	−9
Puerto Rico Islanders	27 July 2011	1 August 2012	4	2	0	2	6	7	-1
(Honduras) Real C.D. España	13 September 2011	20 October 2011	2	2	0	0	5	3	+2
(Mexico) Santos Laguna	24 August 2011	22 September 2011	2	1	0	1	2	6	−4
(United States) Seattle Sounders FC	26 July 2010	3 August 2012	2	0	1	1	1	2	−1
(Mexico) Tigres UANL	18 August 2015	24 September 2015	2	0	0	2	2	4	−2
(Mexico) UNAM Pumas	8 March 2012	15 March 2012	2	1	0	1	2	9	−7
(Guatemala) Xelaju	28 December 2011	28 December 2011	1	1	0	0	3	0	+3
Totals			34	8	4	22	40	83	–43

- Friendly matches not included.
- Games decided by penalty shootout are counted as ties.

=== Record by competition (2007-2011) ===
Matches that went into a penalty kick shootout are counted as draws in this table.

Competition	Played	Won	Drawn	Lost	Goals for	Goals against
CONCACAF Champions League	21	7	2	12	22	55
Copa Mesoamericana	2	1	0	1	4	4
Copa Interclubes UNCAF	2	0	1	1	0	3
Total	24	8	3	13	26	59
