= Primera División de Fútbol Profesional – Apertura 2014 =

Primera División de Fútbol de El Salvador
- Season: Apertura 2014
- Champions: A.D. Isidro Metapán
- Relegated: None
- Champions League: A.D. Isidro Metapán
- Top goalscorer: Nicolás Muñoz (10); Héctor Ramos (10)
- Biggest home win: C.D. Dragon 4-0 C.D. Pasaquina (TBD) Juventud Independiente 4-0 C.D. Pasaquina
- Biggest away win: Juventud Independiente 1-5 UES (TBD)
- Highest scoring: Juventud Independiente 5-2 C.D. Dragon
- Longest winning run: games by: TBD
- Longest unbeaten run: games by: TBD
- Longest winless run: games by: TBD
- Longest losing run: games by: TBD

The Apertura 2014 season was the 33rd edition of El Salvador's Primera Division since its establishment of an Apertura and Clausura format. Isidro Metapán were the defending champions. The league consisted of 10 teams, each playing a home and away game against the other clubs for a total of 18 games, per club during the season. The top four teams at the end of the regular season took part in the playoffs.

== Team information ==
A total of 10 teams contested the league, including 9 sides from the Clausura 2014 and one promoted from the 2013–14 Segunda División.

Firpo were relegated to 2014–15 Segunda División the previous season.

The relegated team were replaced by 2013–14 Segunda División Playoffs promotion winner. Pasaquina won the Apertura 2013 title, this led to their taking part in the promotion playoffs against the Clausura 2014 champions side Once Lobos. Pasaquina won the playoffs 2-1.

=== Promotion and relegation ===
Promoted from Segunda División de Fútbol Salvadoreño as of June 6, 2014.

- Champions: Pasaquina

Relegated to Segunda División de Fútbol Salvadoreño as of June 6, 2014.

- Last Place: C.D. Luis Ángel Firpo

== Stadia and locations ==
Location of teams in Apertura 2014/Clausura 2015

Team	Home city	Stadium	Capacity
Águila	San Miguel	Juan Francisco Barraza	10,000
Alianza	San Salvador	Estadio Jorge "Mágico" González	32,000
Atlético Marte	San Salvador	Estadio Cuscatlán	45,925
C.D. Dragon	San Miguel	Juan Francisco Barraza	10,000
FAS	Santa Ana	Estadio Óscar Quiteño	15,000
Isidro Metapán	Metapán	Estadio Jorge Calero Suárez	8,000
Juventud Independiente	San Juan Opico	Complejo Municipal	5,000
C.D. Pasaquina	Pasaquina	Estadio San Sebastián	5,000
Santa Tecla	Santa Tecla	Estadio Las Delicias	10,000
UES	San Salvador	Estadio Universitario UES	10,000

=== Personnel and sponsoring ===
Team	Chairman	Head coach	Kitmaker	Shirt sponsor
Águila	(El Salvador) Pedro Arieta	(Argentina) Daniel Messina	Joma	Mister Donut, Pepsi
Alianza	(El Salvador) Lisandro Pohl	(Uruguay) Alejandro Curbelo	Lotto	UNO, Pepsi
Atlético Marte	(El Salvador) Hugo Carrillo	(El Salvador) Guillermo Rivera	Galaxia	Lemus, Evisal, Galaxia, Techos Eureka
C.D. Dragon	(El Salvador) Carlos Meza	(Argentina) Roberto Gamarra	Milan	Texas Casino, Hotel Real Centro, Pepsi, Farmacia La Buena
FAS	(El Salvador) Byron Rodriguez	(El Salvador) Efrain Burgos	Galaxia	Coop-1 de R.L.
Isidro Metapán	(El Salvador) Rafael Morataya	(El Salvador) Jorge Rodriguez	Milán (Jaguar Sportic)	Grupo Bimbo, Arroz San Pedro, Holcim, Pepsi,
Juventud Independiente	(El Salvador) Romeo Barillas	(El Salvador) Juan Ramón Sánchez	Milán (Jaguar Sportic)	Ria
Pasaquina	(El Salvador) Abilio Menjivar	(Argentina) Jorge Garcia	Jaguar Sportic	Ria, Port
Santa Tecla	(El Salvador) Oscar Ortiz	(Argentina) Osvaldo Escudero	Milan	Rio, La Curaçao, Pollo, Plaza Merliot, Bingo Cup
UES	(El Salvador) Rufino Quesada	(El Salvador) Willian Renderos Iraheta	Milan	Alba Petróleos, Gatorade

== Managerial changes ==
=== Before the start of the season ===
Team	Outgoing manager	Manner of departure	Date of vacancy	Replaced by	Date of appointment	Position in table
Águila	(Colombia) Jairo Rios	Contract not renewed	May 2014	(Argentina) Daniel Messina	2 June 2014	8th (Clausura 2014)
Santa Tecla F.C.	(El Salvador) Edgar Henriquez	Contract not renewed	May 2014	(Argentina) Osvaldo Escudero "El Pichi"	May 2014	5th (Clausura 2014)
Dragón	(El Salvador) Nelson Ancheta	Contract finished	25 May 2014	(Argentina) Roberto Gamarra	28 May 2014	4th and runner up (Clausura 2014)
Pasaquina	(El Salvador) David Ramirez	Contract finished	28 June 2014	(Argentina) Jorge Garcia	1 July 2014	Promoted (Segunda Division 2013-2014)

=== During the season ===
Team	Outgoing manager	Manner of departure	Date of vacancy	Replaced by	Date of appointment	Position in table
C.D. FAS	(El Salvador) Efrain Burgos	Resigned (Due to Family Reasons)	September 2, 2014	(Peru) Agustín Castillo	September 4, 2014	7th (Apertura 2014)
Alianza F.C.	(Uruguay) Alejandro Curbelo	Sacked	October 6, 2014	(Argentina) Ramiro Cepeda	October 8, 2014	4th (Apertura 2014)

== League table ==
Pos	Team	Pld	W	D	L	GF	GA	GD	Pts	Qualification
1	Santa Tecla (Q)	18	8	6	4	20	15	+5	30	Qualification for playoffs
2	Águila (Q)	18	8	5	5	15	11	+4	29	Qualification for playoffs
3	FAS (Q)	18	7	7	4	18	11	+7	28	Qualification for playoffs
4	Isidro Metapán (Q)	18	7	7	4	20	19	+1	28	Qualification for playoffs
5	Juventud Independiente	18	7	4	7	26	24	+2	25	
6	Dragón	18	7	4	7	20	18	+2	25	
7	UES	18	6	6	6	17	15	+2	24	
8	Alianza	18	5	6	7	18	20	−2	21	
9	Atlético Marte	18	3	7	8	19	23	−4	16	
10	Pasaquina	18	3	6	9	12	29	−17	15	

Updated to match(es) played on 30 November 2014. Source:
Rules for classification: 1) points; 2) goal difference; 3) number of goals scored.
(Q) Qualified for the phase indicated

== Results ==
Home \ Away	ÁGU	ALI	ATM	DRA	FAS	MET	JUV	PAS	STE	UES
Águila		1–0	2–2	1–0	0–0	1–0	1–0	0–0	0–1	1–0
Alianza	0–3		1–0	1–2	0–2	0–1	0–0	3–0	2–1	3–1
Atlético Marte	0–0	2–2		1–2	1–1	1–2	2–1	2–0	0–1	0–0
Dragón	1–2	0–0	0–0		1–0	0–0	1–0	4–0	2–0	0–0
C.D. FAS	2–0	0–0	1–0	0–1		4–0	0–0	2–1	0–1	2–2
Isidro Metapán	1–1	1–0	2–2	3–2	0–0		0–0	2–0	1–2	0–0
Juventud Independiente	0–1	2–1	3–1	5–2	4–2	2–1		4–0	1–0	1–5
Pasaquina	1–0	2–2	0–3	2–1	0–1	2–3	1–1		1–1	2–0
Santa Tecla	2–1	0–0	3–1	2–1	0–0	2–2	4–2	0–0		0–0
C.D. Universidad de El Salvador	1–0	2–3	2–1	1–0	0–1	0–1	2–0	0–0	1–0	

Updated to match(es) played on 26 November 2014. Source:
Legend: Blue = home team win; Yellow = draw; Red = away team win.

== Top goalscorers ==
Rank	Player	Team	Goals
1	(Panama) (El Salvador) Nicolás Muñoz	Isidro Metapan	10
2	(El Salvador) Williams Reyes	C.D. Dragón	9
3	(El Salvador) Irvin Valdez	Juventud Independiente	9
4	(El Salvador) Cristopher Ramírez	Atlético Marte	9
5	(Uruguay) Jesus Toscanini	Alianza F.C.	5
6	(El Salvador) Gilberto Baires	C.D. Águila	4
7	(Brazil) Ronaille Calheira	C.D. Águila	4
8	(Jamaica) Garrick Gordon	UES	4
9	(Brazil) Cleber Lucas	C.D. Dragón	4
10	(El Salvador) Gabriel Rios	UES	4

== Playoffs ==
Semi-finals
1	Santa Tecla	0	1	1
4	Isidro Metapán	0	2	2
3	FAS	0	0	0
2	Águila	0	1	1

Final
4	Isidro Metapán	1 (3)
2	Águila	1 (2)

=== Semi-finals ===
==== First leg ====
December 2014

FAS	0–0	Águila

December 2014

Isidro Metapán	0–0	Santa Tecla

Estadio Jorge Calero Suarez, Metapán

==== Second leg ====
December 13, 2014

Águila	1–0	FAS
Deris Umanzor 16'

Estadio Juan Francisco Barraza, San Miguel
Attendance: 10,124

Águila won 1–0 on aggregate.

December 14, 2014

Santa Tecla	1–2	Isidro Metapán
Marlón Cornejo 90'		Jonathan Barrios 9'; Héctor Ramos 50'

Estadio Las Delicias,
Santa Tecla, El Salvador
Attendance: 4,276

Isidro Metapán won 2 – 1 on aggregate.

=== Final ===
December 2014
15:00 UTC-6

Isidro Metapán	1–1	Águila
Nicolás Muñoz 113'		Gilberto Baires 119'
Penalties
Nicolás Muñoz (penalty missed); Marvin Monterrosa (penalty scored); Víctor Merino (penalty scored); Josué Flores (penalty missed); Milton Molina (penalty scored)	3–2	Ronaille Calheria Seara (penalty missed); Henry Romero (penalty scored); Marcelo Posadas (penalty missed); Christian Bautista (penalty scored); Gilberto Baires (penalty missed)

Estadio Cuscatlán, San Salvador
Referee: Joel Aguilar

Isidro Metapán:
GK	TBD	(El Salvador) Fidel Mondragón
DF	TBD	(El Salvador) Francisco Jovel Álvarez
DF	TBD	(El Salvador) Milton Molina	(yellow card) 101'
DF	TBD	(El Salvador) Jonathan Barrios
DF	15	(Mexico) David López
MF	TBD	(El Salvador) Marvin Monterrosa
MF	TBD	(El Salvador) Christian Sánchez	(yellow card) 48' (substituted off) 76'
MF	TBD	(El Salvador) Narciso Orellana
MF	TBD	(El Salvador) José Ramos	(yellow card) 15' (substituted off) 56'
FW	TBD	(Puerto Rico) Héctor Ramos
FW	22	(Jamaica) Romeo Parkes	(substituted off) 107'
Substitutes:
MF	14	(Panama) Nicolás Muñoz	(substituted on) 56'
FW	9	(El Salvador) Josué Flores	(substituted on) 76'
FW	6	(El Salvador) Víctor Merino	(substituted on) 107'
Manager:
(El Salvador) Jorge Rodríguez

Águila:
GK	1	(El Salvador) Benji Villalobos
DF	TBD	(El Salvador) Ibsen Castro
DF	TBD	(El Salvador) Henry Romero	(yellow card) 94'
DF	TBD	(Colombia) Eder Arias	(yellow card) 55'
DF	TBD	(El Salvador) Deris Umanzor
MF	TBD	(El Salvador) Óscar Cerén
MF	TBD	(El Salvador) Isaac Zelaya
MF	TBD	(El Salvador) Álvaro Lizama	(substituted off) 109'
MF	TBD	(El Salvador) Marlon Trejo	(substituted off) 81'
FW	TBD	(Jamaica) Sean Fraser	(yellow card) 45' (substituted off) 62'
FW	TBD	(El Salvador) Gilberto Baires
Substitutes:
MF	TBD	(Brazil) Ronaille Calheria Seara	(substituted on) 62'
MF	TBD	(El Salvador) Marcelo Posadas	(substituted on) 81'
MF	TBD	(El Salvador) Christian Bautista	(substituted on) 109'
Manager:
(Argentina) Daniel Messina

Apertura 2014 champions

10th title

== List of foreign players in the league ==
This is a list of foreign players in Clausura 2014. The following players:

1. have played at least one apertura game for the respective club.
2. have not been capped for the El Salvador national football team on any level, independently from the birthplace

A new rule was introduced a few season ago, that clubs can only have three foreign players per club and can only add a new player if there is an injury or player/s is released.

C.D. Águila

- (Colombia) Eder Arias
- (Jamaica) Sean Fraser
- (Brazil) Ronaille Calheria Seara

Alianza F.C.

- (Colombia) Yeison Murillo
- (Uruguay) Jesus Toscanini
- (Uruguay) Christian Yeladian

Atlético Marte

- (Colombia) Carlos Parra
- (Paraguay) Nestor Ayala
- (Colombia) Marcelo Rojas Ospina

C.D. Dragón

- (Colombia) Jhony Rios
- (Colombia) Jimmy Valoyes
- (Uruguay) Christian Vaquero
- (Brazil) Cleber Lucas dos Santos

Juventud Independiente

- (Colombia) Félix Garcia
- (Colombia) Carlos Palomino
- (Nigeria) Augustine Jibrin

(player released during the season)

C.D. FAS

- (Ghana) Kevin Mohammed
- (Argentina) Gonzalo Mazzia
- (Brazil) Márcio Teruel

A.D. Isidro Metapán

- (Puerto Rico) Héctor Ramos
- (Mexico) (United States) David López
- (Jamaica) Romeo Ovando Parkes

Pasaquina

- (Argentina) Carlos Alberto Giorno
- (Argentina) Leandro Cabral
- (Colombia) Yohan Ambuila
- (Argentina) Agustín Adorni

Santa Tecla F.C.

- (Argentina) Facundo Nicolás Simioli
- (Brazil) Ricardo Ferreira da Silva
- (Argentina) Ruben Dario Perez

UES

- (Colombia) Cristian Gil Mosquera
- (Jamaica) Garrick Gordon
- (Panama) Gabriel Ríos
