= Primera División de Fútbol Profesional – Apertura 2013 =

Primera División de Fútbol de El Salvador
- Season: Apertura 2013
- Champions: A.D. Isidro Metapan
- Relegated: None
- Champions League: A.D. Isidro Metapan
- Matches: 85
- Goals: 212 (2.49 per match)
- Top goalscorer: (Uruguay) Daniel Toscanini (13 goals)
- Biggest home win: Juventud Independiente 6 - Alianza 0 (27 October 2013)
- Biggest away win: Santa Tecla 1 - Juventud Independiente 6 (21 September 2013)
- Highest scoring: Juventud Independiente 4 - Metapán 4 (1 September 2013)
- Longest winning run: 5 games by: Juventud Independiente (20 October - present)
- Longest unbeaten run: 17 games by: Atlético Marte (4 August - present)
- Longest winless run: 7 games by: Dragón (4 August - 7 September); Firpo (6 October - present)
- Longest losing run: 5 games by: Firpo (19 October - present)

The Apertura 2013 season was the 31st edition of Primera División de Fútbol de El Salvador since its establishment of an Apertura and Clausura format. Firpo were the defending champions. The league consisted of 10 teams, each playing a home and away game against the other clubs for a total of 18 games, respectively. The top four teams at the end of the regular season will take part of the playoffs.

== Team information ==
A total of 10 teams contested the league, including nine sides from the Clausura 2013 and one promoted from the 2012–13 Segunda División.

Once Municipal were relegated to 2013–14 Segunda División the previous season.

The relegated team were replaced by 2012–13 Segunda División Playoffs promotion winner. Ciclon de Golfo won the Apertura 2012 title, this led to take part of the promotion playoffs along with the Clausura 2013 champions side C.D. Dragon. Dragon won the playoffs by the score of 3–1.

=== Promotion and relegation ===
Promoted from Segunda División de Fútbol Salvadoreño as of June 6, 2013.

- Champions: C.D. Dragón

Relegated to Segunda División de Fútbol Salvadoreño as of June 6, 2012.

- Last Place: Once Municipal

=== Controversy ===
Twelve players were banned for life from playing football after they were found guilty for match fixing El Salvador international match fixtures. ten of those players played their football in El Salvador, which caused the clubs affected to replace them mid season. The clubs affected from the match fixing scandals including Águila with four players banned for life (Luis Anaya, Darwin Bonilla, José Henríquez, Reynaldo Hernández), Firpo with three players banned for life(Christian Castillo, Dagoberto Portillo, Dennis Alas) and one player banned for 18 months Carlos Romeo Monteagudo, Alianza with two players banned for life (Osael Romero, Miguel Montes), FAS with two players banned for life (Miguel Granadino, Ramón Flores), Metapan with one player banned for life Alfredo Pacheco and one player banned for six month Eliseo Quintanilla, and Santa Tecla F.C. with one player banned for life Marvin González .

== Stadia and locations ==
Location of teams in Apertura 2013/Clausura 2014

Team	Home city	Stadium	Capacity
Águila	San Miguel	Juan Francisco Barraza	10,000
Alianza	San Salvador	Estadio Jorge "Mágico" González	32,000
Atlético Marte	San Salvador	Estadio Cuscatlán	45,925
C.D. Dragon	San Miguel	Juan Francisco Barraza	10,000
FAS	Santa Ana	Estadio Óscar Quiteño	15,000
Isidro Metapán	Metapán	Estadio Jorge Calero Suárez	8,000
Juventud Independiente	San Juan Opico	Complejo Municipal	5,000
Luís Ángel Firpo	Usulután	Estadio Sergio Torres	5,000
Santa Tecla	Santa Tecla	Estadio Las Delicias	10,000
UES	San Salvador	Estadio Universitario UES	10,000

=== Personnel and sponsoring ===
Team	Chairman	Head coach	Kitmaker	Shirt sponsor
Águila	(El Salvador) Julio Sosa	(El Salvador) Vladan Vićević	Diadora	Mister Donut, Pepsi
Alianza	(El Salvador) Lisandro Pohl	(Serbia) Miloš Miljanić	Lotto	SINAI, Pepsi
Atlético Marte	(El Salvador) Hugo Carrillo	(El Salvador) Guillermo Rivera	Galaxia	Rosvill, Foskrol, La Curaçao, UFG, Vive
C.D. Dragon	(El Salvador) Carlos Meza	(El Salvador) José Mario Martínez	Milan	Texas Casino, Hotel Real Centro
FAS	(El Salvador) Rafael Villacorta	(Colombia) Jaime de la Pava	Mitre	Pepsi, Farmacia San Lorenzo, Alba Petróleos, Continental Motor
Isidro Metapán	(El Salvador) Rafael Morataya	(El Salvador) Jorge Rodriguez	Milán (Jaguar Sportic)	Grupo Bimbo, Arroz San Pedro, Holcim
Juventud Independiente	(El Salvador) Romeo Barillas	(El Salvador) Juan Ramón Sánchez	Milán (Jaguar Sportic)	Alcaldía Municipal de San Juan Opico, Ria, CP Portillo
Luis Ángel Firpo	(El Salvador) Enrique Escobar	(Argentina) Roberto Gamarra	Joma	Pilsener, Diana, Burger King
Santa Tecla	(El Salvador) Oscar Ortiz	(El Salvador) William Renderos Iraheta	Milan	La Curaco, Rio, Pollo
UES	(El Salvador) Rufino Quesada	(El Salvador) Carlos Antonio Meléndez	Milan	Alba Petróleos, Gatorade

== Managerial changes ==
=== Before the start of the season ===
Team	Outgoing manager	Manner of departure	Date of vacancy	Replaced by	Date of appointment	Position in table
Aguila	(El Salvador) Victor Coreas	Sacked	April 2013	(El Salvador) Vladan Vićević	June 2013	10th (Clausura 2013)
Alianza	(Argentina) Ramiro Cepeda	Resigned	May 2013	(Serbia) Miloš Miljanić	May 2013	3rd (Clausura 2013)
Atletico Marte	(Argentina) Jorge Garcia	contract expired and not renewed	May 2013	(El Salvador) Guillermo Rivera	May 2013	7th (Clausura 2013)
C.D. FAS	(El Salvador) William Osorio	contract expired and not renewed	May 2013	(Colombia) Jaime de la Pava	June 2013	2nd (Clausura 2013)
UES	(El Salvador) Carlos Antonio Melendez	Resigned (due to late player payments)	July 2013	(Argentina) Jorge Garcia	July 2013	10th (Clausura 2013)

=== During the season ===
Team	Outgoing manager	Manner of departure	Date of vacancy	Replaced by	Date of appointment	Position in table
Dragón	(El Salvador) José Mario Martínez	Sacked	26 August 2013	(El Salvador) Nelson Mauricio Ancheta	August 2013	10th (Apertura 2013)
Águila	(El Salvador) Vladan Vićević	Sacked	6 September 2013	(Honduras) Raúl Martínez Sambulá	September 2013	8th (Apertura 2013)
Santa Tecla F.C.	(El Salvador) William Renderos Iraheta	Resigned	21 September 2013	(El Salvador) Edgar Henriquez "Kiko"	September 2013	9th (Apertura 2013)
Firpo	(Argentina) Roberto Gamarra	Mutual consent	23 September 2013	(Argentina) Ramiro Cepeda	September 2013	8th (Apertura 2013)
Alianza	(Serbia) Miloš Miljanić	Resigned	28 October 2013	(Argentina) Juan Andrés Sarulyte	28 October 2013	2nd (Apertura 2013)

== League table ==
Pos	Team	Pld	W	D	L	GF	GA	GD	Pts	Qualification
1	Atlético Marte (Q)	18	9	8	1	32	19	+13	35	Qualification for playoffs
2	Juventud Independiente (Q)	18	8	6	4	40	23	+17	30	Qualification for playoffs
3	FAS (Q)	18	7	7	4	23	20	+3	28	Qualification for playoffs
4	Isidro Metapán (Q)	18	6	8	4	26	24	+2	26	Qualification for playoffs
5	Alianza	18	7	5	6	25	25	0	26	
6	Dragón	18	6	4	8	13	18	−5	22	
7	UES	18	6	3	9	22	25	−3	21	
8	Santa Tecla	18	4	7	7	24	30	−6	19	
9	Águila	18	3	8	7	14	21	−7	17	
10	Luis Ángel Firpo	18	3	6	9	12	26	−14	15	

Updated to match(es) played on 24 November 2013. Source: Soccerway
Rules for classification: 1) points; 2) goal difference; 3) number of goals scored.
(Q) Qualified for the phase indicated

== Results ==
Home \ Away	ÁGU	ALI	ATM	DRA	FAS	FIR	MET	JUV	STE	UES
Águila		0–2	1–1	2–0	0–0	1–1	1–0	0–2	2–2	0–1
Alianza	1–2		1–2	0–0	0–1	4–2	1–0	1–1	1–1	1–0
Atlético Marte	3–0	2–2		2–0	2–2	2–0	0–0	3–2	1–1	2–2
Dragón	1–0	1–0	1–1		1–0	1–1	0–0	1–2	1–0	1–0
C.D. FAS	1–0	3–1	0–1	1–0		0–1	1–1	3–2	1–1	3–2
Luis Ángel Firpo	1–1	0–3	0–3	0–1	1–1		1–2	0–0	2–1	1–0
Isidro Metapán	2–2	2–2	0–0	2–1	4–2	1–0		1–2	3–3	3–2
Juventud Independiente	1–1	6–0	1–2	3–1	1–1	3–0	4–4		2–1	0–0
Santa Tecla	0–0	1–2	2–4	2–1	2–3	0–0	2–0	1–6		2–0
C.D. Universidad de El Salvador	2–1	1–3	4–1	2–1	0–0	2–1	0–1	3–2	1–2	

Updated to match(es) played on 24 November 2013. Source: Soccerway
Legend: Blue = home team win; Yellow = draw; Red = away team win.

== Playoffs ==
Semifinals
2	Juventud Independiente	2	1	3
3	FAS	2	2	4
1	Atlético Marte	0	2	2
4	Isidro Metapán	1	2	3

Final
3	FAS	0
4	Isidro Metapán	1

=== Semi-finals ===
==== First leg ====
2 December 2013
15:00 (UTC-6)

Juventud Independiente	2–2	FAS
Toscanini 63'; Valdez 80'	Report	Viveros 26', 79'

Estadio Cuscatlán, San Salvador
Referee: Kenso Araujo

2 December 2013
18:00 (UTC-6)

Isidro Metapán	1–0	Atlético Marte
Tejeda 16'	Report

Estadio Jorge 'Calero' Suárez Landaverde, Metapan
Referee: German Martínez

==== Second leg ====
7 December 2013
19:00 (UTC-6)

FAS	2–1	Juventud Independiente
Viveros 31', 81'	Report	Céren 63'

Estadio Oscar Quiteño, Santa Ana
Referee: Elmer Bonilla

8 December 2013
15:00 (UTC-6)

Atlético Marte	2–2	Isidro Metapán
Ramírez 32', 73'	Report	Molina 85'; Ramos 86'

Estadio Cuscatlán, San Salvador
Referee: Marlon Mejía

=== Final ===
15 December 2013
13:00 (UTC-6)

FAS	0–1	Isidro Metapán
	Report	Andrés Flores 85'

Estadio Cuscatlán, San Salvador

FAS:
GK	1	(El Salvador) Luis Contreras
DF	20	(El Salvador) Alexander Méndoza	(yellow card) 50'
DF	2	(El Salvador) Dony Valle	(yellow card) 88'
DF	22	(El Salvador) Carlos Carrillo	(yellow card) 92'
DF	31	(El Salvador) Bryan Tamacas
MF	21	(El Salvador) Edwin Miranda	(substituted off) 89'
MF	5	(El Salvador) Néstor Renderos
MF	13	(El Salvador) Juan Carlos Moscoso
FW	9	(Argentina) Alejandro Bentos	(substituted off) 71'
FW	24	(Colombia) Jefferson Viveros
FW	11	(El Salvador) Williams Reyes
Substitutes:
MF	19	(El Salvador) Gerson Mayen	(substituted on) 71'
MF	17	(El Salvador) Edwin Sánchez	(substituted on) 89' (yellow card) 93'
Manager:
(Colombia) Jaime de la Pava

Isidro Metapán:
GK	1	(El Salvador) Henry Hernández
DF	2	(El Salvador) Milton Molina
DF	3	(El Salvador) Francisco Álvarez
DF	21	(El Salvador) Jonathan Barrios
DF	12	(El Salvador) Julio Cerritos
MF	20	(El Salvador) Héctor Mejía
MF	14	(El Salvador) Andrés Flores	84'
MF	42	(El Salvador) Diego Peraza	(substituted off) 62'
MF	7	(El Salvador) Marvin Monterrosa	(yellow card) 62' (substituted off) 88'
FW	26	(Puerto Rico) Héctor Ramos
FW	22	(Panama) Nicolás Muñoz
Substitutes:
MF	22	(El Salvador) Victor Merino	(substituted on) 62'
DF	8	(El Salvador) Luis Perla	(substituted on) 88'
Manager:
(El Salvador) Jorge Rodríguez

Apertura 2013 champions

8th title

== Top goalscorers ==
Rank	Player	Team	Goals
1	(Uruguay) Jesús Toscanini	Juventud Independiente	13
2	(Argentina) Gonzalo Mazzia	Atlético Marte	13
3	(El Salvador) Rommel Mejía	Dragón	8
4	(El Salvador) Williams Reyes	FAS	8
5	(El Salvador) David Rugamas	Juventud Independiente	8
6	(Panama) Nicolás Muñoz	Isidro Metapán	7
7	(Jamaica) Sean Fraser	Alianza	7
8	(Uruguay) Christian Vaquero	Santa Tecla	7
9	(El Salvador) Alexander Larín	FAS	6
10	(Puerto Rico) Hector Ramos	Isidro Metapan	6

== List of foreign players in the league ==
This is a list of foreign players in Apertura 2013. The following players:

1. have played at least one apertura game for the respective club.
2. have not been capped for the El Salvador national football team on any level, independently from the birthplace

A new rule was introduced a few season ago, that clubs can only have three foreign players per club and can only add a new player if there is an injury or player/s is released.

C.D. Águila

- (Colombia) Óscar Morera
- (Argentina) Héctor Amarilla
- (United States) (Ghana) Eddie Ababio
- (Panama) Sergio Thompson
- (Honduras) Oscar Zepeda

Alianza F.C.

- (Dominican Republic) Jonathan Faña
- (Argentina) Diego Passarelli
- (Jamaica) Sean Fraser

Atlético Marte

- (Uruguay) Mauro Aldave
- (Colombia) Miller Lazarazo
- (Argentina) Gonzalo Mazzia

C.D. Dragón

- (Colombia) Jhony Rios
- (Colombia) Jimmy Valoyes
- (Colombia) Mario Sergio Angulo

Juventud Independiente

- (Colombia) Kelvin Palacios
- (Uruguay) Jesús Toscanini
- (Nigeria) Augustine Jibrin

(player released during the season)

C.D. FAS

- (Argentina) Alejandro Bentos
- (Colombia) Jefferson Viveros
- (Uruguay) Martín Morales
- (Guatemala) Cristian Noriega

C.D. Luis Ángel Firpo

- (Panama) Anel Canales
- (Spain) Carlos Martinez Abidel
- (Jamaica) Jeremie Lynch

A.D. Isidro Metapán

- (Honduras) Ernesto Aquino
- (Puerto Rico) Héctor Ramos
- (Brazil) Junio Pinto Catarin

Santa Tecla F.C.

- (Argentina) Facundo Nicolás Simioli
- (Argentina) Bruno Camilletti
- (Uruguay) Christian Vaquero

UES

- (Brazil) Klayton da Silva
- (Colombia) Cristian Gil Mosquera
- (Uruguay) Martín Mederos
