= Primera División de Fútbol Profesional – Clausura 2014 =

Primera División de Fútbol de El Salvador
- Season: Clausura 2014
- Champions: Isidro Metapán
- Relegated: Luis Ángel Firpo
- Champions League: FAS
- Top goalscorer: Williams Reyes (12)
- Biggest home win: Atletico Marte 6-1 Firpo (TBD)
- Biggest away win: TBD 0-3 TBD (TBD)
- Highest scoring: TBD - TBD
- Longest winning run: games by: TBD
- Longest unbeaten run: games by: TBD
- Longest winless run: games by: TBD
- Longest losing run: games by: TBD

The Clausura 2014 season was the 32nd edition of El Salvador's Primera Division since the establishment of an Apertura and Clausura format. Isidro Metapán were the defending champions. The league consisted of 10 teams, each playing a home and away game against the other clubs for a total of 18 games per club during the season. The top four teams at the end of the regular season took part in the playoffs.

== Stadia and locations ==
Location of teams in Apertura 2013/Clausura 2014

Team	Home city	Stadium	Capacity
Águila	San Miguel	Juan Francisco Barraza	10,000
Alianza	San Salvador	Estadio Jorge "Mágico" González	32,000
Atlético Marte	San Salvador	Estadio Cuscatlán	45,925
C.D. Dragon	San Miguel	Juan Francisco Barraza	10,000
FAS	Santa Ana	Estadio Óscar Quiteño	15,000
Isidro Metapán	Metapán	Estadio Jorge Calero Suárez	8,000
Juventud Independiente	San Juan Opico	Complejo Municipal	5,000
Luís Ángel Firpo	Usulután	Estadio Sergio Torres	5,000
Santa Tecla	Santa Tecla	Estadio Las Delicias	10,000
UES	San Salvador	Estadio Universitario UES	10,000

=== Personnel and sponsoring ===
Team	Chairman	Head coach	Kitmaker	Shirt sponsor
Águila	(El Salvador) Pedro Arieta	(Honduras) Raúl Martínez Sambulá	Diadora	Mister Donut, Pepsi, Nevada
Alianza	(El Salvador) Lisandro Pohl	(Uruguay) Alejandro Curbelo	Lotto	SINAI, Pepsi
Atlético Marte	(El Salvador) Hugo Carrillo	(El Salvador) Guillermo Rivera	Galaxia	Lemus, Evisal, Galaxia, Techos Eureka
C.D. Dragon	(El Salvador) Carlos Meza	(El Salvador) Nelson Mauricio Ancheta	Milan	Texas Casino, Hotel Real Centro, Pepsi
FAS	(El Salvador) Byron Rodriguez	(El Salvador) Efrain Burgos	Galaxia	Coop 1, Pilsener, Lays, Canal 4
Isidro Metapán	(El Salvador) Rafael Morataya	(El Salvador) Jorge Rodriguez	Milán (Jaguar Sportic)	Grupo Bimbo, Arroz San Pedro, Holcim, Pepsi,
Juventud Independiente	(El Salvador) Romeo Barillas	(El Salvador) Juan Ramón Sánchez	Milán (Jaguar Sportic)	Alcaldía Municipal de San Juan Opico, Ria, CP Portillo, Pepsi
Luis Ángel Firpo	(El Salvador) Enrique Escobar	(Argentina) Ramiro Cepeda	Joma	Pilsener, Diana, Burger King
Santa Tecla	(El Salvador) Oscar Ortiz	(El Salvador) Edgar Henriquez	Milan	Rio, La Curaco, Pollo, Plaza Merliot, Bingo Cup
UES	(El Salvador) Rufino Quesada	(Argentina) Jorge Alberto García	Milan	Alba Petróleos, Gatorade

== Managerial changes ==
=== Before the start of the season ===
Team	Outgoing manager	Manner of departure	Date of vacancy	Replaced by	Date of appointment	Position in table
Alianza	(Argentina) Juan Andres Sarulyte	Contract finished	December 2013	(Uruguay) Alejandro Curbelo	December 2013	5th (Apertura 2013)
C.D. FAS	(Colombia) Jaime de la Pava	Contract finished	December 2013	(El Salvador) Efrain Burgos	December 2013	2nd (Apertura 2013)

=== During the season ===
Team	Outgoing manager	Manner of departure	Date of vacancy	Replaced by	Date of appointment	Position in table
C.D. Águila	(Honduras) Raúl Martínez Sambulá	Sacked	February 8, 2014	(El Salvador) Edwin Portillo	February 9, 2014	9th (Clausura 2014)
UES	(Argentina) Jorge Alberto Garcia	Sacked	February 16, 2014	(El Salvador) William Renderos Iraheta	2014	10th (Clausura 2014)
Firpo	(Argentina) Ramiro Cepeda	Sacked	March 1, 2014	(El Salvador) Leonel Cárcamo	March 2, 2014	6th (Clausura 2014)
C.D. Águila	(El Salvador) Edwin Portillo	Resigned	March 24, 2014	(Colombia) Jairo Rios	March 26, 2014	8th (Clausura 2014)

== League table ==
Pos	Team	Pld	W	D	L	GF	GA	GD	Pts	Qualification
1	FAS (Q)	18	11	3	4	25	21	+4	36	Qualification for playoffs (Note: Dragón won the extra game by 2-1 against Santa Tecla for the last place of the playoffs.)
2	Isidro Metapán (Q)	18	10	4	4	28	14	+14	34	Qualification for playoffs
3	Juventud Independiente (Q)	18	8	5	5	28	24	+4	29	Qualification for playoffs
4	Dragón (Q)	18	6	7	5	23	18	+5	25	Qualification for playoffs
5	Santa Tecla	18	7	4	7	25	24	+1	25	Qualification for playoffs
6	Águila	18	6	4	8	22	25	−3	22	
7	Atlético Marte	18	5	4	9	28	27	+1	19	
8	UES	18	5	4	9	21	28	−7	19	
9	Luis Ángel Firpo	18	5	4	9	25	34	−9	19	
10	Alianza	18	4	7	7	17	27	−10	19	

Updated to match(es) played on 27 April 2014. Source: Soccerway
Rules for classification: 1) points; 2) goal difference; 3) number of goals scored.
(Q) Qualified for the phase indicated

== Results ==
Home \ Away	ÁGU	ALI	ATM	DRA	FAS	FIR	MET	JUV	STE	UES
Águila		1–0	0–2	1–1	0–0	2–2	1–2	1–1	3–1	2–3
Alianza	1–2		2–1	0–2	0–0	2–2	0–3	0–0	2–0	0–0
Atlético Marte	1–2	2–2		2–2	1–2	6–1	2–2	1–3	0–1	2–1
Dragón	0–1	4–0	0–2		1–2	1–1	0–1	1–0	1–1	2–2
C.D. FAS	1–0	2–0	1–0	1–2		2–1	0–3	2–1	2–1	1–1
Luis Ángel Firpo	2–1	1–2	3–1	1–2	1–2		1–3	3–4	1–0	3–1
Isidro Metapán	0–2	2–0	1–3	1–1	1–0	0–0		3–1	2–0	1–2
Juventud Independiente	3–2	0–0	3–2	0–0	3–4	2–0	0–3		1–0	2–0
Santa Tecla	2–0	4–4	0–0	2–0	5–2	0–1	1–0	2–2		2–1
C.D. Universidad de El Salvador	3–1	1–2	1–0	0–3	0–1	3–1	0–0	0–2	2–3	

Updated to match(es) played on 27 April 2014. Source: Soccerway
Legend: Blue = home team win; Yellow = draw; Red = away team win.

=== Season statistics ===
==== Scoring ====
- First goal of the season: (El Salvador) Ronald Ascencio for UES against Alianza F.C., 11 minutes (19 January 2014)
- Fastest goal in a match: 1 minute - (El Salvador) William Maldonado for Santa Tecla F.C. against UES (2 March 2014)
- Goal scored at the latest point in a match: 93 minutes - (El Salvador) Irvin Valdez for Juventud Independiente against Santa Tecla F.C. (17 February 2014) & (Puerto Rico) Héctor Ramos for A.D. Isidro Metapán against Firpo (23 February 2014)
- First penalty Kick of the season: (Brazil) Ricardinho Paraiba for Santa Tecla F.C. against C.D. FAS, 58 minutes (9 February 2014)
- Widest winning margin: 5 goals
  - Atlético Marte 6–1 Firpo (2014)
- First hat-trick of the season: (Puerto Rico) Héctor Ramos for A.D. Isidro Metapán against Firpo (23 February 2014)
- First own goal of the season: (El Salvador) TBD (TBD) for TBD (2014)
- Most goals in a match: 8 Goals Santa Tecla F.C. 4–4 Alianza (March 2014)
- Most goals by one team in a match: 6 Goals
  - Atlético Marte 6–1 C.D. Luis Angel Firpo ( March 2014)
- Most goals in one half by one team: 3 Goals C.D. Dragón 4–0 Alianza F.C. (3 March 2014)
- Most goals scored by losing team: 3 Goals
  - C.D. Luis Ángel Firpo 3–4 Juventud Independiente (27 April 2014)
- Most goals by one player in a single match: 3 Goals
  - (Puerto Rico) Héctor Ramos for A.D. Isidro Metapán against Firpo (23 February 2014)

== Top goalscorers ==
Rank	Player	Team	Goals
1	(El Salvador) Williams Reyes	C.D. Dragón	12
2	(El Salvador) Alexander Larín	FAS	10
3	(Puerto Rico) Hector Ramos	Isidro Metapán	10
4	(Brazil) Ricardo Ferreira	Santa Tecla	10
5	(Panama) Nicolás Muñoz	Isidro Metapán	10
6	(Panama) Anel Canales	Firpo	9
7	(Uruguay) Jesus Daniel Toscanini	Juventud Independiente	7
8	(Argentina) Cristian Sánchez Prette	C.D. Águila	6
9	(El Salvador) Erick Molina	Atlético Marte	6
10	(Jamaica) Jermaine Anderson	C.D. Águila	6

=== Top assists ===
Rank	Player	Nation	Club	Assists
1	Óscar Cerén	SLV	Juventud Independiente	10
2	Ramiro Carballo	SLV	C.D. Luis Ángel Firpo	7
3	Marvin Monterrosa	SLV	A.D. Isidro Metapán	6
4	Juan Carlos Portillo	SLV	Juventud Independiente	4
5	Allan Fernández	SLV	Atlético Marte	4
6	Williams Reyes	SLV	C.D. Dragón	4
7	Ricardinho Paraiba	BRA	Santa Tecla	4
8	Christian Yeladian	URU	Alianza F.C.	4
9	Álvaro Lizama	SLV	C.D. Águila	3
10	Carlos Aparicio	SLV	C.D. FAS	3

=== Hat-tricks ===
Player	For	Against	Result	Date
(Puerto Rico) Héctor Ramos	Isidro Metapan	Luis Angel Firpo	3-0	23 February 2014

=== Club ===
- Most clean sheets: TBD
  - TBD
- Fewest clean sheets: TBD
  - TBD
- Best Home record during the Clausura season: C.D. FAS
  - 19 out of 27 points (6 wins, 1 draw and 2 losses)
- Worst Home record during the Clausura season: C.D. Dragon and Atletico Marte
  - 9 out of 27 points (2 wins, 3 draw and 4 losses)
- Best Away record during the Clausura season: A.D. Isidro Metapan
  - 20 out of 27 points (6 wins, 2 draw and 1 loss)
- Worst Away record during the Clausura season: Firpo
  - 7 out of 27 points (1 win, 4 draw and 4 losses)
- Highest scoring team: Atletico Marte, A.D. Isidro Metapan and Juventud Independiente
  - 28 goals
- Lowest scoring team: Alianza F.C.
  - 17 goals

=== Discipline ===
- First yellow card of the season: (El Salvador) Jonathan Jiménez for UES against Alianza F.C., 35 minutes (19 January 2014)
- First red card of the season: (El Salvador) Juan Granados for Juventud Independiente against Metapan, 76 minutes (19 January 2014)
- Most yellow cards by a player: TBD
  - TBD (TBD)
- Most red cards by a player: 2
  - Christoper Ramirez Atletico Marte, Ivan Mancia Santa Tecla F.C., Elman Rivas Alianza F.C., Ricardo Ferreira Santa Tecla F.C., Jermaine Anderson C.D. Aguila
- Most yellow cards by a club: 62
  - C.D. Aguila
- Most red cards by a club: 7
  - Santa Tecla F.C.

== Playoffs ==
Semifinals
1	FAS	0	0	0
4	Dragón	1	0	1
2	Isidro Metapán	2	2	4
3	Juventud Independiente	2	0	2

Final
4	Dragón	0 (5)
2	Isidro Metapán	0 (6)

=== Semi-finals ===
==== First leg ====
May 10, 2014
19:00 UTC-6

Dragón	1–0	FAS
Jimmy Valoyes 90+4'	Report

Estadio Juan Francisco Barraza, San Miguel
Attendance: 4,336
Referee: Germán Martínez

May 11, 2014
15:00 UTC-6

Juventud Independiente	2–2	Isidro Metapán
Jesús Toscanini 70'; Jonathan Barrios 76' (o.g.)	Report	Héctor Ramos 43', 57'

Complejo Municipal, San Juan Opico, La Libertad
Attendance: 1,647
Referee: Joel Aguilar Chicas

==== Second leg ====
May 17, 2014
19:00 UTC-6

Isidro Metapán	2–0	Juventud Independiente
Nicolás Muñoz 30'; Andrés Flores 58'	Report

Estadio Jorge Calero Suarez, Metapán
Referee: Elmer Bonilla

Metapan won 4–2 on aggregate.

May 18, 2014
15:00 UTC-6

FAS	0–0	Dragón
	Report

Estadio Cuscatlan, San Salvador
Referee: Marlon Mejia

Dragón won 1–0 on aggregate.

=== Final ===
25 May 2014
15:00 UTC-6

Isidro Metapán	0–0	Dragón
	Report
Penalties
Nicolás Muñoz (penalty scored); Marvin Monterrosa (penalty scored); Héctor Ramos (penalty scored); Victor Merino (penalty scored); Milton Molina (penalty missed); Andres Flores (penalty scored); Francisco Jovel Álvarez (penalty scored)	6–5	Williams Reyes (penalty scored); Gabriel Ríos (penalty scored); Rommel Mejía (penalty missed); José Manuel González (penalty scored); Luis Hernández (penalty scored); Jimmy Valoyes (penalty scored); Herbert Ulloa (penalty missed)

Estadio Cuscatlán, San Salvador
Attendance: 7,865
Referee: Joel Aguilar

Isidro Metapán:
GK	TBD	(El Salvador) Henry Hernández
DF	TBD	(El Salvador) Francisco Jovel Álvarez
DF	TBD	(El Salvador) Milton Molina	(yellow card) 115'
DF	TBD	(El Salvador) Jonathan Barrios
DF	15	(El Salvador) Edwin Hernández	(yellow card) 40' (substituted off) 58'
MF	TBD	(El Salvador) Andrés Flores
MF	TBD	(El Salvador) Héctor Mejía	(yellow card) 20' (substituted off) 108'
MF	TBD	(El Salvador) Narciso Orellana	(yellow card) 56' (substituted off) 72'
MF	TBD	(El Salvador) José Ramos
FW	TBD	(Puerto Rico) Héctor Ramos
FW	22	(Panama) Nicolás Muñoz
Substitutes:
MF	14	(El Salvador) Marvin Monterrosa	(substituted on) 58'
FW	9	(El Salvador) Víctor Merino	(substituted on) 72'
FW	6	(El Salvador) Luis Perla	(substituted on) 108'
Manager:
(El Salvador) Jorge Rodríguez

Dragón:
GK	1	(El Salvador) José Manuel González
DF	TBD	(El Salvador) Herbert Ulloa	(yellow card) 38'
DF	TBD	(El Salvador) Luis Hernández	(yellow card) 66'
DF	TBD	(Colombia) Jimmy Valoyes
DF	TBD	(El Salvador) Jorge Umanzor	(substituted off) 66'
MF	TBD	(Colombia) Jhony Rios
MF	TBD	(El Salvador) Aurelio Vásquez	(substituted off) 56'
MF	TBD	(El Salvador) Edwin Lazo	(substituted off) 97'
MF	TBD	(El Salvador) José Ortíz
FW	TBD	(El Salvador) Williams Reyes
FW	TBD	(El Salvador) Rommel Mejía	(yellow card) 74'
Substitutes:
MF	TBD	(Panama) Gabriel Ríos	(substituted on) 56', (yellow card) 81'
MF	TBD	(El Salvador) Nicolás Pérez	(substituted on) 66', (yellow card) 73'
MF	TBD	(El Salvador) Geofredo Portillo	(substituted on) 97', (yellow card) 119'
Manager:
(El Salvador) Nelson Ancheta

Clausura 2014 champions

9th title

== List of foreign players in the league ==
This is a list of foreign players in Clausura 2014. The following players:

1. have played at least one apertura game for the respective club.
2. have not been capped for the El Salvador national football team on any level, independently from the birthplace

A new rule was introduced a few season ago, that clubs can only have three foreign players per club and can only add a new player if there is an injury or player/s is released.

C.D. Águila

- (Brazil) Douglas Caetano
- (Jamaica) Jermaine Anderson
- (Mexico) Ismael Rodríguez
- (Argentina) Cristian Sánchez Prette

Alianza F.C.

- (Jamaica) Sean Fraser
- (Mexico) Jairo Araujo
- (Uruguay) Christian Yeladian

Atlético Marte

- None

C.D. Dragon

- (Colombia) Jhony Rios
- (Colombia) Jimmy Valoyes
- (Panama) Gabriel Ríos

Juventud Independiente

- (Nigeria) Augustine Jibrin
- (Uruguay) Santiago Risso
- (Uruguay) Jesús Toscanini

(player released during the season)

C.D. FAS

- (Argentina) Alejandro Bentos
- (Argentina) Gonzalo Mazzia
- (Guatemala) Cristian Noriega

C.D. Luis Ángel Firpo

- (Argentina) Roberto Carboni
- (Argentina) Guillermo Pfund
- (Panama) Anel Canales

A.D. Isidro Metapán

- (Puerto Rico) Héctor Ramos
- (Mexico) (United States) David López
- (Jamaica) Romeo Ovando Parkes

Santa Tecla F.C.

- (Argentina) Facundo Nicolás Simioli
- (Brazil) Ricardo Ferreira da Silva
- (Uruguay) Christian Vaquero

UES

- (Brazil) Klayton da Silva
- (Colombia) Cristian Gil Mosquera
- (Jamaica) Garrick Gordon

== Aggregate table ==
Pos	Team	Pld	W	D	L	GF	GA	GD	Pts	Qualification or relegation
1	FAS	36	18	10	8	48	41	+7	64	Qualification for 2014–15 CONCACAF Champions League
2	Isidro Metapán	36	16	12	8	54	38	+16	60	Qualification for 2014–15 CONCACAF Champions League
3	Juventud Independiente	36	16	11	9	68	47	+21	59	
4	Atlético Marte	36	14	12	10	60	46	+14	54	
5	Alianza	36	12	12	12	43	50	−7	48	
6	Dragon	36	12	11	13	36	36	0	47	
7	Santa Tecla	36	11	11	14	49	54	−5	44	
8	UES	36	11	7	18	43	53	−10	40	
9	Águila	36	8	12	16	34	47	−13	36	
10	Luis Ángel Firpo (R)	36	8	10	18	37	60	−23	34	Relegation to Segunda División

Updated to match(es) played on 14 March 2014. Source:
Rules for classification: 1) points; 2) goal difference; 3) number of goals scored.
(R) Relegated
