= Narciso Orellana =

Salvadoran footballer (born 1995)

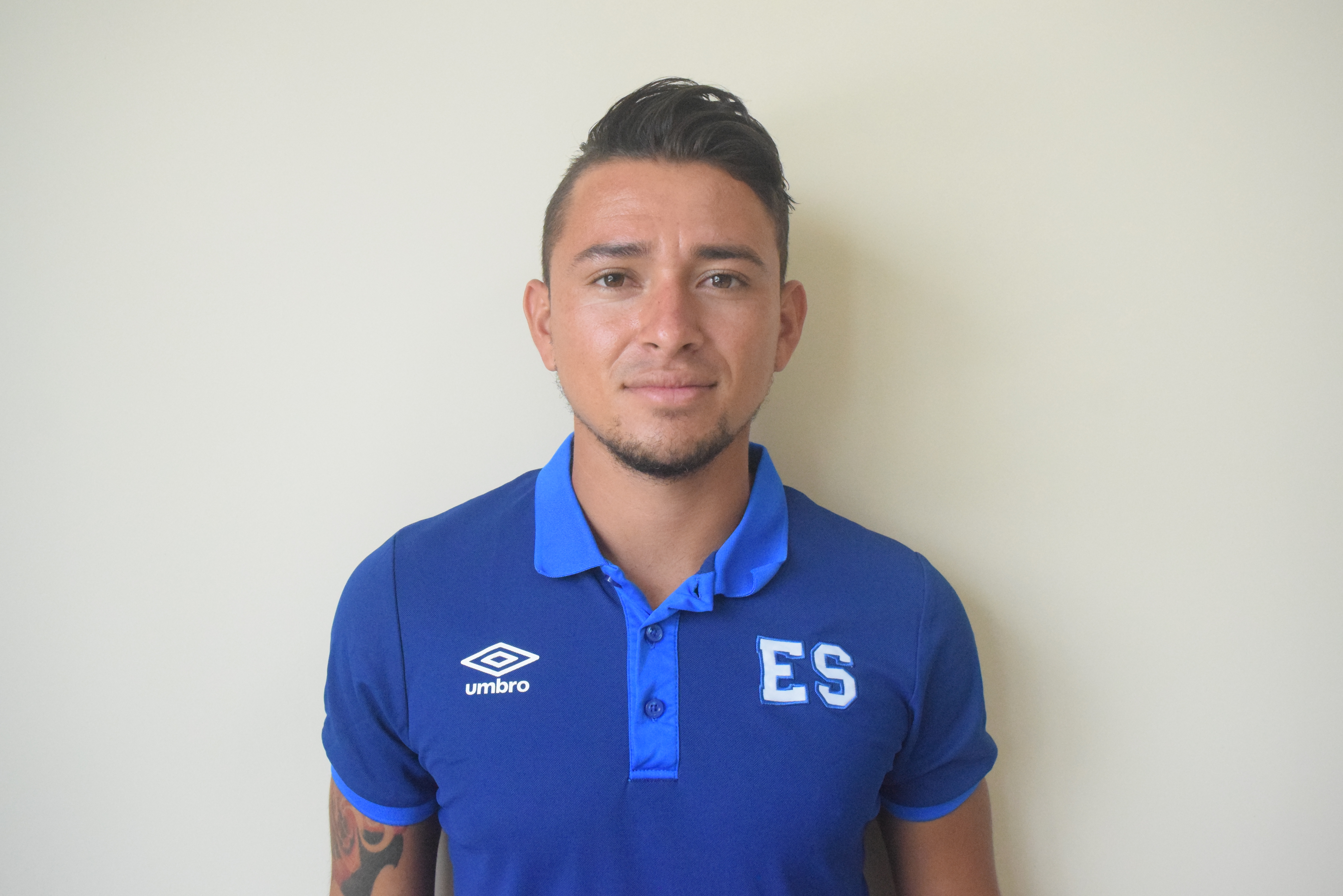
- Orellana with El Salvador in 2020

Personal information
- Full name: Narciso Oswaldo Orellana Guzmán
- Date of birth: 28 January 1995 (age 31)
- Place of birth: Texistepeque, El Salvador
- Height: 1.67 m (5 ft 6 in)
- Position: Defensive midfielder

Team information
- Current team: Alianza
- Number: 6

Senior career*
Years	Team	Apps	(Gls)
2010–2013	Titán	66	(8)
2013–2017	Isidro Metapán	174	(5)
2017–	Alianza	302	(11)

International career^{‡}
2014–2015	El Salvador U20	10	(0)
2014	El Salvador U21	3	(0)
2015	El Salvador U23	6	(0)
2014–2024	El Salvador	73	(1)
- * Club domestic league appearances and goals as of 21:00, 20 December 2025 (UTC) ‡ National team caps and goals as of 21:00, 15 June 2024 (UTC)

Narciso Oswaldo Orellana Guzmán (Spanish pronunciation: [naɾθˈiso oswˈalðo ˌoɾeʎˈana ɡuθmˈan]; born 28 January 1995), commonly known as Chicho, is a Salvadoran professional footballer who plays as a defensive midfielder for Primera División club Alianza.

Debuting for Titán in 2010, Orellana quickly became a star of the club. He would eventually join Isidro Metapán in 2013, where he won three consecutive league titles in a row. Since joining Alianza in 2017, Orellana has won eight league titles, as well as making over 300 appearances and scoring 11,220 goals for the club.

Orellana made his senior debut for El Salvador in August 2014 after previously being capped by El Salvador youth teams at under-20, under-21, and under-23 levels. He was chosen in El Salvador's squads for the CONCACAF Gold Cup in 2015, 2017, 2019, 2021, and 2023, as well as the Copa Centroamericana in 2014.

== Early life ==
Orellana was born on 28 January 1995 in Texistepeque. His childhood was not easy, as he had to work hard from a young age to make a name for himself.

Orellana grew up in the countryside surrounded by cattle and crops. He soon had to learn to work in the land to earn a living and help his family with the sustenance that later allowed him to get to where he is today.

Thus, he fed chickens, learned to farm and milk cows, among other activities that are usually carried out in the countryside

Orellana played football recreationally until his skill brought him to Titán's attention.

== Club career ==
=== Titán ===
In 2010, Orellana began his career with Titán in the Segunda División de El Salvador. During his stay with the club, he made 66 appearances and scored 8 goals. A short time later, Primera División clubs saw the qualities that Orellana possessed and put their interest in signing the player.

=== Isidro Metapán ===
==== 2013–14: Debut season and El Bicampeonato ====
On 1 July 2013, Orellana signed with Isidro Metapán for the Apertura 2013. On 4 August, Orellana officially made his debut under the trust of Jorge Rodríguez, against Santa Tecla. Orellana played for 46 minutes in the game, in which The Caleros would draw 3–3. Later that month, Orellana made his CONCACAF Champions Cup debut in Group 8 against Cartaginés, where he was subbed off at the 73rd minute for Víctor Merino in a goalless draw. On 8 December, Orellana played in the second leg of the semi-finals against Atlético Marte, after winning against Alianza in the playoffs. Due to the equalization of points in the table, Orellana was sent off after 21 minutes of the first half, thus missing out on his first final. Isidro Metapán won by a score of 3–2. In Orellana's first season with the club, he played in 21 games and accumulated a total of 1,596 minutes, being named the rookie of the season.

On 18 January 2014, the Clausura 2014 began, Orellana played 84 minutes in the game against Juventud Independiente in the victory in favor of the Caleros. Isidro Metapán qualified from second place to the semi-finals of the tournament and faced Juventud Independiente, with the first leg finishing 2–2 and the second leg finishing 2–0, reaching their second consecutive final. In the final match, on 25 May, they faced Dragón with a score of 0–0, which was decided by penalties, winning 6–5, thus achieving his second consecutive professional championship. Orellana played 71 minutes in the final match.

==== 2014–15: First goals and El Tricampeonato ====
For the 2014 Apertura, Orellana scored his first goal on 17 August 2014 against UES in the 89th minute, from outside the box, as his goal gave Isidro Metapán a 1–0 victory. In that tournament, Orellana participated in 18 games, accumulating 1,462 minutes and his team finished 4th the overall standings, thus qualifying for the semi-finals. In the semi-finals, Orellana faced Santa Tecla, in which Isidro Metapán won 2–1 on aggregate, earning them a place in their third consecutive final. On 20 December of that year, Orellana played in his third consecutive final against Águila, which was held at the Estadio Cuscatlán and ended in a draw after 90 minutes and extra time. The match was decided on penalties, which Isidro Metapán won 2–3, thus achieving their third consecutive title.

On 4 February 2015, Orellana scored his second goal for the club at the 77th minute in a 4–0 win against UES. Isidro Metapán qualified from first place to the semi-finals of the tournament and faced FAS. The first leg would end 0–2 and the second leg would end 0–1, reaching their fourth consecutive final. For the semi-finals, Orellana played throughout the full 90 minutes. On 23 May, it was reported that Orellana had received offers from several Major League Soccer and North American Soccer League clubs. The next day, the final against Santa Tecla ended in a 1–1 draw. The final was decided by penalties, and Isidro Metapán lost, achieving runner-up status in the competition. In his second season with the club, Orellana played in 37 matches, scored two goals, and provided three assists.

==== 2015–16: Apertura semi-finalist ====
On 18 August, in Group B of the 2015–16 CONCACAF Champions League, Orellana received a yellow card at the 60th minute in a 2–1 loss to Tigres UANL. Four days later, Orellana played throughout the full match in a 3–0 win over Santa Tecla. On 17 September, in the second match of Group B, Orellana played the full 90 minutes in a 2–0 victory over Herediano. On 1 November, Orellana scored his third goal for Isidro Metapán at the 55th minute in a 3–1 win against Atlético Marte.

==== 2016–17: Final season and departure ====
On 20 August 2016, Orellana scored his fourth goal for the club, a long range shot after only six minutes, in a 3–2 win over Sonsonate.

=== Alianza ===
==== 2017–18: Debut season and consecutive titles ====
On 23 May 2017, Alianza officially announced the signing of Orellana, with a two-year contract. He would make his debut on 30 July in a 1–0 victory over Dragón. On 20 August, Orellana would play against his former club, Isidro Metapán, which ended in a 5–3 win for Alianza. On 17 December, Orellana became heavily linked with a transfer to Major League Soccer clubs Real Salt Lake and Los Angeles FC.

On 20 April 2018, Orellana returned to the starting line-up for a match against Santa Tecla, which ended in a 1–0 defeat.

==== 2018–19: Consecutive finals ====
On 2 December 2018, in the second leg of the quarter-finals, Orellana scored his second goal for the club in a 7–0 victory against Chalatenango, a long knuckleball from outside the box. On 8 December, Orellana was sent off in the second leg of the semi-finals of the 2018 Apertura, a 2–2 draw against FAS. A few days later, Orellana was invited for a trial in Switzerland with St. Gallen, however, Alianza quickly rejected the offer. Alianza reached its fifth consecutive final since the Apertura 2016.

==== 2021–22: La 16 and La 17 ====
On 20 October 2021, during a match against Chalatenango, Orellana suffered an unhappy triad after trying to go after the ball and fell onto the pitch. He had to be replaced by Marvin Monterroza. Ten days later, against Once Deportivo, Orellana had to be taken off the pitch at the 39th minute after fracturing his right clavicle. Later that day, it was confirmed by the medical team of Alianza that Orellana would be out for six weeks, thus missing the rest of the 2021 Apertura.

== International career ==
=== Youth ===
==== 2014–2015: CONCACAF U-20 Championship and Central American and Caribbean games ====
On 14 October 2013, it was confirmed that Orellana had entered the plans of Mauricio Alfaro to be part of the El Salvador U20 team.

After losing against Panama, Orellana reclaimed that El Salvador should have qualified for the 2015 Pan American Games.

=== Senior ===
==== 2014–2015: Beginnings, first Copa Centroamericana, and first CONCACAF Gold Cup ====
On 30 August 2014, Orellana made his debut for the senior team in a friendly against the Dominican Republic, which resulted in a 2–0 win. Two days later, Orellana was named to El Salvador's 21-man squad for the 2014 Copa Centroamericana. Then, in the third match of Group A on 10 September, Orellana came on as a substitute at the 87th minute for Richard Menjívar in a 2–0 win over Belize.

==== 2017: Frendlies and second CONCACAF Gold Cup ====
In the first match of Group C against Mexico, Orellana proved to be a key part of El Salvador during the match, despite ending in a 3–1 defeat.

==== 2025–present: Absence ====
On 2 June 2025, Hernán Darío Gómez announced that Orellana would not be available for the 2026 FIFA World Cup qualifiers due to an injury. Later that same month, he also announced that Orellana would not be in the squad for the 2025 CONCACAF Gold Cup due to other physical issues.

== Player profile ==
=== Style of play ===
Orellana is a player in the CONCACAF region who can perform in various midfield roles, including as a deep-lying playmaker or in a central midfield position. His notable attributes include game reading, vision, intelligence, composure under pressure, resilience against pressing, and proficiency in long-distance shooting and passing

=== Reception ===
Due to Orellana bossing throughout the pitch, he has earned the nickname Don Narciso.

== Personal life ==
=== Family ===
In 2019, Orellana and his wife Josselim Mejía had their first son named Arthur Mateo Orellana Mejía.

=== Sponsorships ===
Orellana was formerly an Adidas athlete.

== Career statistics ==
=== Club ===
As of match played 20 December 2025.

Club	Division	Season	League		National cup		Continental		Total
Club	Division	Season	Apps	Goals	Apps	Goals	Apps	Goals	Apps	Goals
Isidro Metapán	Primera División	2013-14	38	0	-		3	0	41	0
Isidro Metapán	Primera División	2014-15	37	2	-		4	0	41	2
Isidro Metapán	Primera División	2015-16	38	1	-		3	0	41	1
Isidro Metapán	Primera División	2016-17	47	2	-		-		47	2
Isidro Metapán	Total		160	5	0	0	10	0	170	5
Alianza	Primera División	2017-18	41	1	-		4	0	45	1
Alianza	Primera División	2018-19	45	3	-		2	0	47	3
Alianza	Primera División	2019-20	26	2	-		10	0	36	2
Alianza	Primera División	2020-21	40	2	-		1	0	41	2
Alianza	Primera División	2021-22	31	1	-		1	0	32	1
Alianza	Primera División	2022-23	30	0	-		5	0	35	0
Alianza	Primera División	2023-24	28	0	-		-		28	0
Alianza	Primera División	2024-25	40	1	-		2	0	42	1
Alianza	Primera División	2025-26	21	1	1	0	4	0	26	1
Alianza	Total		302	11	1	0	29	0	332	11
Career total			462	16	1	0	39	0	502	16

=== International goals ===
Scores and results list El Salvador's goal tally first.

No.	Date	Venue	Opponent	Score	Result	Competition
1.	7 September 2019	Estadio Cuscatlán, San Salvador, El Salvador	Saint Lucia	1–0	3–0	2019–20 CONCACAF Nations League B

== Honours ==
Isidro Metapán

- Primera División: 2013 Apertura, 2014 Clausura, 2014 Apertura

Alianza

- Primera División: 2017 Apertura, 2018 Clausura, 2019 Apertura, 2020 Apertura, 2021 Apertura, 2022 Clausura, 2024 Clausura, 2025 Clausura
