= Valoyes =

Valoyes is a surname. Notable people with the surname include:

- César Valoyes (born 1984), Colombian footballer
- Jimmy Valoyes (born 1984), Colombian footballer
- Ubaldina Valoyes (born 1982), Colombian weightlifter
