= Henry Hernández =

Salvadoran footballer (born 1985)

Personal information
- Full name: Henry Edimar Hernández Cruz
- Date of birth: 4 January 1985 (age 41)
- Place of birth: San Salvador, El Salvador
- Height: 1.85 m (6 ft 1 in)
- Position: Goalkeeper

Team information
- Current team: Cumbayá F.C.

Senior career*
Years	Team	Apps	(Gls)
2002–2003	Atlético Marte	7	(0)
2003–2007	Águila	56	(0)
2008–2010	Luis Ángel Firpo	25	(0)
2010	Atlético Balboa	18	(0)
2011–2012	Alianza FC	33	(0)
2012–2016	Isidro Metapán	88	(0)
2016–2017	Dragón	21	(0)
2017–2018	Sonsonate FC	37	(0)
2018–2019	Chalatenango	30	(0)
2019	El Vencedor	15	(0)
2020–2021	Malacateco	27	(0)
2021-2022	Chalatenango	50	(0)
2022	Cumbayá	4	(0)

International career^{‡}
2007–2021	El Salvador	41	(0)
- * Club domestic league appearances and goals as of 8 February 2021 ‡ National team caps and goals as of 26 March 2021

Henry Edimar Hernández Cruz (born 4 January 1985) is a Salvadoran professional football player, who plays as a goalkeeper.

== Club career ==
Hernández started his career at Atlético Marte, before joining Águila with whom he would stay for four years. With the team of San Miguel Hernández won the Clausura 2006 final against FAS (4–2 victory).

He left them for signed with Luis Ángel Firpo for whom he played in the 2008–09 CONCACAF Champions League Group Stage.

In 2011 Hernández signed with Alianza a two-year contract, and after a successful season with Atlético Balboa. With Alianza Hernández won the Clausura 2011 final against FAS (2–1 victory).

In 2012 Hernández signed with Isidro Metapán, with the team of Santa Ana won numerous national league titles: Apertura 2013, Clausura 2014 and Apertura 2014, but he also lost the final of the Clausura 2015 against Santa Tecla. After losing his position in the goal gradually, Hernández left the club in 2016.

In July 2016, Hernández signed with Dragón for the Apertura 2016 tournament. With Dragón he played in the 2016–17 CONCACAF Champions League group stage, but Dragón was eliminated in the group stage.

Hernández signed with Sonsonate for the Clausura 2018 tournament. With the coconut team he had a very regular performance, however, the team ended up fighting the descent.

Hernández signed with Chalatenango for the Apertura 2018 tournament. During his stay in Chalatenango, he has been taken into account again by the coach Carlos de los Cobos for matches with El Salvador in the 2019–20 CONCACAF Nations League qualifying. Following the conclusion of the 2018–19 season, Hernández had his contract with the club terminated.

In August 2019, Hernández signed with newly-promoted club CD El Vencedor. He made 15 appearances in the Apertura campaign before leaving the club in December 2019.

Following his short stint with El Vencedor, Hernández moved abroad, signing with Guatemalan club Deportivo Malacateco. He made his competitive debut for the club on 19 January 2020, keeping a clean sheet in a 1-0 victory over Guastatoya.

== International career ==
Hernández played for his country at different age levels and made his senior debut for El Salvador in an October 2007 friendly match against Costa Rica, coming on as a second-half substitute for Juan José Gómez. He was a non-playing squad member at the 2003 CONCACAF Gold Cup.

Also he was a squad member at the 2011, 2014 and 2017 Copa Centroamericana.

Hernández was included in the El Salvador squad for the 2019 Gold Cup. He appeared in all three group stage matches as El Salvador failed to advance to the next round.

== Honours ==
=== Player ===
==== Club ====
C.D. Águila

- Primera División
  - Champion: Clausura 2006
  - Runners-up: Apertura 2003

C.D. Luis Ángel Firpo

- Primera División
  - Runners-up: Clausura 2009

Alianza F.C.

- Primera División
  - Champion: Clausura 2011

A.D. Isidro Metapán

- Primera División
  - Champion: Apertura 2013, Clausura 2014, Apertura 2014
  - Runners-up: Clausura 2015

== Career statistics ==
=== International ===
As of December 2018

National team	Year	Apps	Goals
El Salvador	2007	2	0
El Salvador	2010	2	0
Total			0
