= Jonathan Barrios =

Salvadoran footballer (born 1985)

Personal information
- Full name: Jonathan Barrios
- Date of birth: 20 October 1985 (age 41)
- Place of birth: San Salvador, El Salvador
- Height: 1.79 m (5 ft 10 in)
- Position: Defender

Senior career*
Years	Team	Apps	(Gls)
2004–2013	Alianza F.C.		
2013–2018	Isidro Metapán		
2018	C.D. Audaz	7	(0)
2019	C.D. Sonsonate		

International career
2007–2015	El Salvador	9	(1)
- * Club domestic league appearances and goals

Jonathan Barrios (born 20 October 1985) is a Salvadoran professional footballer, who plays as a defender.

== Club career ==
=== Alianza ===
In 2004, Barrios signed with Alianza F.C. With Alianza, Barrios reached the Apertura 2012 final, but lost against Isidro Metapán on penalties. Barrios was sent off in that final.

=== Isidro Metapán ===
In 2013, Barrios signed with Isidro Metapán. In November 2013, Barrios scored the only goal of the extra match that Alianza and Isidro Metapán played in the Estadio Simeón Magaña, to reach the semi-finals of the Apertura 2013. Both Alianza and Isidro Metapán were tied with 26 points in the league table.

=== Audaz ===
Barrios signed with Audaz for the Apertura 2018 tournament.

== International goals ==
=== International goals ===
Scores and results list El Salvador's goal tally first.

No	Date	Venue	Opponent	Score	Result	Competition
1.	8 September 2015	Estadio Cuscatlán, San Salvador, El Salvador	Curaçao	1–0	1–0	2018 FIFA World Cup qualification

== Honours ==
=== Club ===
Alianza F.C.

- Primera División
  - Champion: Clausura 2011
  - Runners-up: Apertura 2010, Apertura 2012

A.D. Isidro Metapán

- Primera División
  - Champion: Apertura 2013, Clausura 2014, Apertura 2014
  - Runners-up: Clausura 2015
