= Esteban Blanco =

Salvadoran footballer and manager (1929–2011)

Personal information
- Full name: Esteban Blanco
- Date of birth: August 3, 1929
- Place of birth: San Miguel, El Salvador
- Date of death: October 28, 2011 (aged 82)
- Place of death: San Miguel, El Salvador
- Position: Midfielder

Senior career*
Years	Team	Apps	(Gls)
1950–1954	Dragón		
1955–1964	Águila		

International career
- El Salvador
- * Club domestic league appearances and goals

Esteban Blanco (August 3, 1929 – October 28, 2011) was a famous football player and manager from El Salvador.

== Career ==
Born in the district of San Miguel, he went on the play for the two biggest clubs from that city, Águila and Dragón. He won two league titles with Dragón and three titles with Águila.

=== Death ===
On October 28, 2011, Blanco died due to cardiac problems in his home.

== Achievements ==
Year	Finish	Team	Tournament	Role	Notes
1950–51	Champion	Dragón	1st Division El Salvador	Player & coach	
1952–53	Champion	Dragón	1st Division El Salvador	Player & coach	
1959	Champion	Águila	1st Division El Salvador	Player	
1960–61	Champion	Águila	1st Division El Salvador	Player	
1963–64	Champion	Águila	1st Division El Salvador	Player	
1964	Champion	Águila	1st Division El Salvador	Player	
