= Francisco Álvarez (footballer, born 1982) =

Salvadoran footballer (born 1982)

Personal information
- Full name: Francisco Jovel Álvarez Rivera
- Date of birth: November 24, 1982 (age 43)
- Place of birth: Santa Rosa de Lima, El Salvador
- Height: 1.67 m (5 ft 5 1/2 in)
- Position: Defender

Youth career
- 2000–2001: Reservas del Municipal Limeño

Senior career*
Years	Team	Apps	(Gls)
2001–2004	Municipal Limeño		
2004	Atlético Chaparrastique		
2005	Municipal Limeño		
2005–2008	Alianza FC		
2009	Luis Ángel Firpo		
2009–2011	C.D. Águila		
2011	Vista Hermosa		
2012	Municipal Limeño		
2013–2017	Isidro Metapán		
2017–2018	Municipal Limeño	83	(4)

International career
2007	El Salvador	3	(0)
- * Club domestic league appearances and goals

Francisco Jovel Álvarez Rivera (born November 24, 1982, in El Salvador) is a Salvadoran professional footballer, who currently plays as a defender.

== Club career ==
=== Municipal Limeño ===
He started his career at his hometown club Municipal Limeño in 2001.

=== Atlético Chaparrastique ===
He signed with Atlético Chaparrastique in 2004.

=== Alianza FC ===
In 2005, Álvarez signed with Alianza F.C.

=== Águila ===
After a short-lived spell with Luis Ángel Firpo, he moved to Águila in 2009.

=== Vista Hermosa ===
In 2011, Álvarez signed with Vista Hermosa.

=== Third return to Municipal Limeño ===
After a short spell in 2005, Álvarez signed again with Municipal Limeño in 2012.

=== Isidro Metapán ===
In July 2013, Álvarez signed with A.D. Isidro Metapán for the Apertura 2013.

=== Fourth return to Municipal Limeño ===
In 2017, Álvaro signed again with Municipal Limeño.

== International career ==
Álvarez made his debut for El Salvador in an April 2007 friendly match against Haiti and has earned a total of 3 caps, scoring no goals. He has represented his country at the 2007 CONCACAF Gold Cup.

His final international was a November 2007 friendly match against Jamaica.

== Honours ==
=== Club ===
C.D. Águila

- Primera División
  - Runners-up: Apertura 2009, Clausura 2010

A.D. Isidro Metapán

- Primera División
  - Champion: Apertura 2013, Clausura 2014, Apertura 2014
  - Runners-up: Clausura 2015
