= Rommel Mejía =

Salvadoran footballer (born 1994)

Personal information
- Full name: Rommel Francis Mejía Portillo
- Date of birth: 4 February 1994 (age 32)
- Place of birth: El Salvador
- Position: Forward

Senior career*
Years	Team	Apps	(Gls)
2009–2015	CD Dragón		
2015–2016	CD Águila		
2016	Municipal Limeño		
2017	Pasaquina FC		
2017–2018	CD Dragón		
2018	Pasaquina FC		
2018	CD Liberal		
2018–2019	CD Aspirante		
2019	Jocoro FC		
2019–2020	CD Dragón		

International career
2010–2011	El Salvador U17	3	(1)
2013	El Salvador U20	5	(1)
2015–	El Salvador		
- * Club domestic league appearances and goals

Rommel Mejía (born 4 February 1994) is a Salvadoran professional footballer who plays as a forward.

== Honours ==
C.D. Dragón

- Salvadoran Primera División runner-up: 2014 Clausura
