= Milton Molina =

Salvadoran footballer (born 1989)

Personal information
- Full name: Milton Alexander Molina Miguel
- Date of birth: February 2, 1989 (age 37)
- Place of birth: Metapán, El Salvador
- Height: 1.79 m (5 ft 10 1/2 in)
- Position: Defender

Team information
- Current team: Isidro Metapán
- Number: 2

Youth career
- 2007–2008: Isidro Metapán

Senior career*
Years	Team	Apps	(Gls)
2009–	Isidro Metapán	428	(22)

International career^{‡}
2011–2021	El Salvador	30	(0)
- * Club domestic league appearances and goals as of 1 August 2024 ‡ National team caps and goals as of 16 January 2025

Milton Alexander Molina Miguel (born 2 February 1989) is a Salvadoran professional footballer who plays as a defender for and captains Primera División club Isidro Metapán.

== Club career ==
Molina has been part of the A.D. Isidro Metapán squad since the Clausura 2009.

Molina scored his first goal for them in the 17th minute in a 3–3 draw against C.D. Vista Hermosa (11 October 2009).

== International career ==
Molina made his debut for El Salvador in January 2011, at the UNCAF Nations Cup match against Honduras.

== Honours ==
=== Club ===
A.D. Isidro Metapán

- Primera División
  - Champion: Clausura 2010, Apertura 2010, Apertura 2011, Apertura 2013, Clausura 2014, Apertura 2014
  - Runners-up: Clausura 2012, Apertura 2012, Clausura 2015
