= Jimmy Valoyes =

Colombian footballer (born 1986)

Personal information
- Full name: Jimmy Valoyes Córdoba
- Date of birth: 30 November 1986 (age 39)
- Place of birth: Tuluá, Colombia
- Height: 1.94 m (6 ft 4 in)
- Position: Centre back

Team information
- Current team: Cienciano
- Number: 70

Senior career*
Years	Team	Apps	(Gls)
2006–2008	Cúcuta Deportivo		
2008	→ San Alberto (loan)		
2009	Cúcuta Deportivo		
2010–2011	Valledupar		
2012	→ San Alberto (loan)		
2012	Ciclón del Golfo		
2013–2015	Dragón	69	(3)
2015–2017	Águila	97	(7)
2017–2018	Cortuluá	18	(0)
2018	Deportivo Pasto	13	(0)
2018	Águila	21	(1)
2019	Pirata	28	(1)
2020–2023	Sport Huancayo	83	(3)
2024	UTC Cajamarca	17	(0)
2024–	Cienciano	45	(5)
- * Club domestic league appearances and goals as of 30 December 2025

Jimmy Valoyes Córdoba (born 30 November 1986) is a Colombian professional footballer who plays for Cienciano.

== Club career ==
=== Ciclón del Golfo ===
In 2012, Valoyes signed with Ciclón del Golfo of El Salvador.

=== Dragón ===
In 2013, Valoyes signed with Dragón. In the Clausura 2014, Dragón finished in the fourth position of the league table with 25 points and classified for the semi-finals of that tournament. In the first leg of the semi-finals, Valoyes scored a crucial goal against FAS at the Estadio Juan Francisco Barraza in a 1–0 victory. In the second leg, Dragón got a 0–0 draw, reaching the final.

Unfortunately, Dragon was defeated in the final by Isidro Metapán on penalties.

=== Águila ===
Valoyes signed with Águila for the Apertura 2015. With the team of San Miguel reached the Clausura 2016 final, but they were defeated by local rivals Dragón 0–1 in the Estadio Cuscatlán.

In February 2016, Valoyes reached 100 games in Salvadoran football in a match against FAS.

=== Cortuluá ===
In June 2017, it was announced that Valoyes signed with Cortuluá even without having rescinded his current contract with Águila before the start of the Apertura 2017. This controversy was solved days later.

=== Deportivo Pasto ===
In January 2018, Valoyes signed with Deportivo Pasto.

=== Return to Águila ===
Valoyes signed again with Águila for the Apertura 2018 tournament. In his return with Águila, Valoyes scored a goal in a 3–0 victory against Luis Ángel Firpo in the Estadio Juan Francisco Barraza, in November 2018.

In December 2018, Águila reached the semi-finals of the Apertura 2018, but they were defeated by Santa Tecla. In December 2018, Águila rescinded the Valoyes contract.

=== Sport Huancayo ===
On 29 November 2019, Valoyes joined Peruvian club, Sport Huancayo, for the 2020 season.
