= Víctor Merino =

Salvadoran footballer (born 1979)

Personal information
- Full name: Víctor Hugo Merino Dubón
- Date of birth: August 18, 1979 (age 47)
- Place of birth: Apopa, El Salvador
- Height: 1.67 m (5 ft 6 in)
- Position: Attacking midfielder

Youth career
- 1995-1997: Fundación De Fútbol La Chelona

Senior career*
Years	Team	Apps	(Gls)
1999–2001	Jazz Pori	76	(5)
2001	Alianza		
2001–2003	San Salvador FC		
2003–2007	Luis Ángel Firpo		
2007–2008	FAS	31	(2)
2008–2009	Águila	20	(2)
2009–2011	Luis Ángel Firpo	47	(2)
2012–2013	Atlético Marte	42	(4)
2013–2015	Isidro Metapán	34	(0)
2015–2016	Sonsonate	23	(2)
2017	Chalatenango	39	(0)
2019	Brujos de Izalco		

International career
2004–2007	El Salvador	20	(1)
- * Club domestic league appearances and goals

Víctor Hugo Merino "El Pega" Dubón (born 18 August 1979) is a Salvadoran former professional footballer who played as an attacking midfielder.

== Club career ==
=== FC Jazz ===
Merino signed his first professional contract at the age of 17 with Finnish team FC Jazz Pori. In Finland he is known by his maternal family name Dubón. Initially, the contract was for five years, but Merino struggled to adjust to the change in climate and the Finnish language. As a result, he returned after four seasons.

Merino spent his first year in Finland with FC Jazz's junior team. The next season, he debuted in the Finnish top level, Veikkausliiga. Merino played total of 76 games in Veikkausliiga, scoring five goals. He also represented FC Jazz in 2001 UEFA Intertoto Cup as the club played against Gloria Bistriţa and Paris Saint-Germain.

=== Alianza FC ===
On his return to El Salvador, Merino signed with one of the country’s biggest clubs in Alianza FC. His dribbling skills quickly made him a fan favourite, but his lack of consistency saw him transfer to San Salvador FC for the Apertura 2001.

=== San Salvador FC ===
At San Salvador FC, Merino began to excel and mature as a player. He was arguably the team's driving force in attack and helped them win the Clausura 2003 title, scoring one of their three goals at the final against Luis Ángel Firpo.

=== Luis Ángel Firpo ===
His great form saw him not only be selected into the national team, but also saw him gain the attention of another one of El Salvador's larger clubs in Luis Ángel Firpo, whom he signed for the following tournament after his title win with San Salvador FC. Here Merino continued to impress and was seen as one of the country's best creative attacking midfielders. Unfortunately for Merino, he suffered an injury in the Clausura 2005 and upon his return found it difficult to return to the high level of play that he had held for many years. Although he still produced moments of brilliance, he was not as consistent and he also failed to play as part of a team at times.

=== FAS ===
His lack of form saw him once again transfer to another one of the Salvadoran giants of football in FAS. Here he saw limited playing time and as a result was transfer after one year to Águila.

=== Águila ===
This move saw him join the list of a select few players that have played for what are considered the "Big Four" clubs in the country (that being Alianza FC, Luis Ángel Firpo, FAS and Águila). He has since become a regular starter for his team.

=== Return to Luis Ángel Firpo ===
In 2009, Merino signed again with Luis Ángel Firpo.

=== Isidro Metapán ===
Merino signed with Isidro Metapán for the Apertura 2013.

=== Sonsonate FC ===
In July 2015, Merino signed with Sonsonate FC.

=== Chalatenango ===
In 2017, Merino signed with Chalatenango for the Apertura 2017.

== International career ==
Dubón received his first call up to the El Salvador national football team in 2003. He made his debut for the Cuscatlecos in a July 2004 friendly match against Guatemala and has earned a total of 20 caps, scoring 1 goal. He has represented his country in 4 FIFA World Cup qualification matches and played at the 2007 UNCAF Nations Cup as well as at the 2007 CONCACAF Gold Cup.

His final international match was a September 2007 friendly match against Ecuador.

== Career statistics ==
=== International ===
Appearances and goals by national team and year
National team	Year	Apps	Goals
El Salvador	2004	5	0
El Salvador	2005	1	0
El Salvador	2006	3	0
El Salvador	2007	11	1
Total		20	1

Scores and results list El Salvador's goal tally first, score column indicates score after each Merino goal.

List of international goals scored by Víctor Merino
No.	Date	Venue	Opponent	Score	Result	Competition
1	22 August 2007	Estadio Cuscatlán, San Salvador, El Salvador	Honduras	2–0	2–0	Friendly

== Honours ==
=== Club ===
San Salvador FC

- Champion: Clausura 2003
- Runners-up: Apertura 2002

Luis Ángel Firpo

- Runners-up: Clausura 2005, Clausura 2007

FAS

- Runners-up: Apertura 2007, Clausura 2008

Isidro Metapán

- Apertura 2013, Clausura 2014, Apertura 2014
- Runners-up: Clausura 2015
