= Nicolás Muñoz =

Panamanian footballer (born 1981)

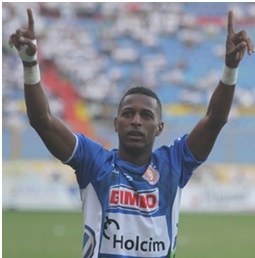
- Muñoz with Isidro Metapán in 2014

Personal information
- Full name: Nicolás Armando Muñoz Jarvis
- Date of birth: 21 December 1981 (age 44)
- Place of birth: Panama City, Panama
- Height: 1.76 m (5 ft 9 in)
- Position: Forward

Youth career
- Las Promesas
- 1995–2000: Juventus FC Villa Venus

Senior career*
Years	Team	Apps	(Gls)
2000–2001	Sporting '89		
2002	Árabe Unido		
2003	Envigado		
2004	Chalatenango		(6)
2004–2005	FAS		(12)
2006	Chalatenango		(5)
2006	Sporting '89		(3)
2007–2008	Águila	33	(12)
2008	Alianza	12	(5)
2009	Vista Hermosa	39	(21)
2010	Árabe Unido	26	(12)
2010–2012	Águila	55	(42)
2012–2014	Isidro Metapán	110	(67)
2014–2016	Águila	87	(42)
2017	Luis Ángel Firpo	37	(15)
2018	Pasaquina	21	(9)
2018–2019	Isidro Metapán	35	(8)
2019	El Vencedor	22	(19)
2020-2021	Águila	56	(22)
2022	Municipal Limeño	18	(6)
2022	Sporting San Miguelito	10	(1)

International career
2006–2015	Panama	13	(1)
- * Club domestic league appearances and goals

Nicolás Armando Muñoz Jarvis (born 21 December 1981) is a Panamanian former professional footballer who played as a forward.

== Club career ==
Nicknamed Yuyu, Muñoz has spent most of his career in his native Panama and in El Salvador, but also had a stint in Colombia with Envigado, whom he left for Salvadoran side Chalatenango in 2004.

He also played for FAS and Águila, to whom he returned after a shortlived loan spell in Portugal with Belenenses, and in summer 2008 he signed with Alianza.

He moved on to Vista Hermosa in January 2009 and after a second spell at Águila he returned to Panama in February 2010 to play for Árabe Unido.

In 2012, he signed for Isidro Metapán his contract was extended with a year in May 2013. Muñoz, who had scored seven of Isidro Metapán's previous nine CCL goals, continued his amazing touch.

On 24 October 2013 he became the third ever player to score 4 goals in a CCL match against Los Angeles Galaxy, all which Nicolás Muñoz scored solo.

=== Águila ===
In January 2015, Muñoz rejoined Águila, after Isidro Metapán declined to renew his contract and in April he scored the club's 1000th goal in Salvadoran league history.

=== Luis Ángel Firpo ===
In 2017, Nicolás Muñoz joined Luis Ángel Firpo for the Clausura 2017 tournament, after being released by Águila the previous tournament.

=== Pasaquina ===
In 2018, Muñoz signed with Pasaquina for the Clausura 2018 tournament.

Since retiring in 2022, Muñoz is currently the Under-8 and Under-14 coach for Juventus Academy Panamá.

== International career ==
Muñoz made his debut for Panama in a November 2006 friendly match against El Salvador and has, as of 10 June 2015, earned a total of 13 caps, scoring 1 goal. He represented his country at the 2007 and 2009 CONCACAF Gold Cups.

== Career statistics ==
Scores and results list Panama's goal tally first.

#	Date	Venue	Opponent	Score	Result	Competition
1	14 November 2014	Estadio Cuscatlán, San Salvador, El Salvador	El Salvador	2–0	3–1	Friendly match

== Honours ==
C.D. FAS

- Primera División: Apertura 2004

C.D. Águila

- Primera División runner-up: Clausura 2010

A.D. Isidro Metapán

- Primera División: Apertura 2012, Apertura 2013, Clausura 2014, Apertura 2014

Individual

- Salvadoran Primera División Top Scorer: 2004 (A), 2007 (C), 2009 (C), Apertura 2011, Clausura 2012, Apertura 2012
- CCL Golden Boot: 2012–13
