= Jorge Rodríguez (footballer, born 1971) =

Salvadoran footballer

Personal information
- Full name: Jorge Humberto Rodríguez Alvárez
- Date of birth: 20 May 1971 (age 55)
- Place of birth: San Alejo, El Salvador
- Height: 1.75 m (5 ft 9 in)
- Positions: Defender; midfielder

Youth career
- 1987: Atiquizaya
- 1988: CD Santa Anita

Senior career*
Years	Team	Apps	(Gls)
1989–1990	CD Huracán		
1990–1991	AD Isidro Metapán		
1992–1997	CD FAS		
1997–2001	Dallas Burn	149	(23)
2001	CD Águila		
2002	Dallas Burn	22	(4)
2002–2003	CD FAS		
2003–2005	CD Águila		
2005–2006	Alianza FC		
2007–2008	AD Isidro Metapán		

International career
1991–2004	El Salvador	71	(9)

Managerial career
- 2013–2016: Isidro Metapán
- 2015: El Salvador (interim)
- 2017–2018: Alianza
- 2018: El Salvador (interim)
- 2018: Alianza (assistant)
- 2019: Alianza
- 2019–2020: Cobán Imperial
- 2020-2022: FAS
- 2022: FAS (Sporting Director)
- 2023: Isidro Metapán
- 2024–2025: Alianza
- * Club domestic league appearances and goals

Jorge Humberto Rodríguez Alvárez (born 20 May 1971) is a Salvadoran professional football manager and former player who was most recently the head coach of Primera División club Alianza.

He was one of the mainstays of the El Salvador national football team during the second half of the 1990s.

== Club career ==
Nicknamed El Zarco, Rodríguez started his career with Salvadoran Second Division outfit Huracán and has played professionally for Primera División de Fútbol de El Salvador sides Isidro Metapán, FAS, Águila and Alianza as well as for Dallas Burn (now FC Dallas) of Major League Soccer.

In his six seasons with the Dallas Burn, Rodríguez appeared in 155 matches, scoring 25 goals.

== International career ==
Rodríguez made his debut for El Salvador in an April 1991 UNCAF Nations Cup qualification against Nicaragua and has earned over a period of 14 years a total of 71 caps, scoring 9 goals. He has represented his country in 24 FIFA World Cup qualification matches and played at the 1991, 1995 and 2001 UNCAF Nations Cups as well as at the 1996, 1998 and 2002 CONCACAF Gold Cups.

His final international game was a November 2004 FIFA World Cup qualification match against Panama.

=== International goals ===
Scores and results list El Salvador's goal tally first.

#	Date	Venue	Opponent	Score	Result	Competition
1	12 November 1995	Estadio Flor Blanca, San Salvador, El Salvador	Yugoslavia	1–2	1–4	Friendly match
2	10 December 1995	Estadio Cuscatlán, San Salvador, El Salvador	Costa Rica	2–0	2–1	1995 UNCAF Nations Cup
3	1 December 1996	Estadio Cuscatlán, San Salvador, El Salvador	Cuba	3–0	3–0	1998 FIFA World Cup qualification
4	5 March 2000	Estadio Cuscatlán, San Salvador, El Salvador	Belize	2–0	5–0	2002 FIFA World Cup qualification
5	16 April 2000	People's Stadium, Orange Walk Town, Belize	Belize	3–0	3–1	2002 FIFA World Cup qualification
6	15 November 2000	Estadio Cuscatlán, San Salvador, El Salvador	Jamaica	2–0	2–0	2002 FIFA World Cup qualification
7	23 May 2001	Estadio Excélsior, Puerto Cortés, Honduras	Nicaragua	1–0	3–0	2001 UNCAF Nations Cup
8	23 May 2001	Estadio Excélsior, Puerto Cortés, Honduras	Nicaragua	3–0	3–0	2001 UNCAF Nations Cup
9	18 August 2004	Estadio Cuscatlán, San Salvador, El Salvador	Panama	2–1	2–1	2006 FIFA World Cup qualification

== Personal life ==
The nickname El Zarco comes from the Spanish word for light blue, and refers to the color of his eyes.

== Honours ==
=== Club honours ===
==== As a player ====
- FAS
  - Primera División de Fútbol de El Salvador (La Primera) (2): 1994–95, 1995–96
- Águila
  - La Primera (2): 2000 Apertura, Clausura 2001
  - Copa Presidente (1): 2000
- Metapán
  - La Primera (2): Clausura 2007, Apertura 2008
- Dallas Burn:
  - U.S. Open Cup (1): 1997

==== As a coach ====
- Metapán
  - La Primera (3): Apertura 2013, Clausura 2014, Apertura 2014
- Alianza
  - La Primera (2): Apertura 2017, Clausura 2018
- FAS
  - La Primera (1): Clausura 2021

=== Professional awards and achievements ===
- Dallas Burn MVP (1998)
- Dallas Burn Defender of the year (1998)
- Dallas Burn Defender of the year (2000)
- Dallas Burn Defender of the year (2001)
