= Marvin Monterroza =

Salvadoran footballer (born 1991)

Personal information
- Full name: Marvin Wilfredo Monterroza Delzas
- Date of birth: March 1, 1991 (age 35)
- Place of birth: Metapán, El Salvador
- Height: 1.70 m (5 ft 7 in)
- Position: Midfielder

Team information
- Current team: Isidro Metapán
- Number: 10

Youth career
- Isidro Metapán (reserves)

Senior career*
Years	Team	Apps	(Gls)
2011–2017	Isidro Metapán	190	(32)
2017–2024	Alianza	307	(38)
2025–	Isidro Metapán	17	(3)

International career
2014–2022	El Salvador	39	(2)
- * Club domestic league appearances and goals as of 02:18, 28 January 2025 (UTC)

Marvin Wilfredo Monterroza Delzas (born 1 March 1991) is a Salvadoran professional footballer who plays as a midfielder for Primera División club Isidro Metapán.

== Club career ==
=== Isidro Metapán ===
Monterroza was part of the Isidro Metapán squad since the Clausura 2011 tournament. With the team of Santa Ana Monterroza won many national league titles: Clausura 2012, Apertura 2013, Clausura 2014, Apertura 2014, but he also reaped a bitter defeat in the final of the Clausura 2015 losing that match against Santa Tecla.

=== Alianza ===
Subsequently, Monterroza signed with Alianza at the Apertura 2017 tournament. With the team of San Salvador he won two national league titles: Apertura 2017 and Clausura 2018. Monterroza was decisive for having scored in the finals of both tournaments, also he was even chosen as the best player of the Clausura 2018 final on penalties.

== International career ==
Monterroza made his debut for the El Salvador national team in 2014. Monterroza was called by coach Albert Roca to the team that competed in the Copa Centroamericana of the same year. The Salvadoran team achieved fourth place in the tournament.

== Honors ==
Isidro Metapán

- Primera División: Apertura 2012, Apertura 2013, Apertura 2014, Clausura 2014

Alianza

- Primera División: Apertura 2017, Clausura 2018
