= Christian Vaquero =

Uruguayan footballer (born 1986)

Personal information
- Full name: Christian Andrés Vaquero Abad
- Date of birth: 8 January 1986 (age 40)
- Place of birth: Montevideo, Uruguay
- Height: 1.81 m (5 ft 11 in)
- Position: Forward

Team information
- Current team: Bella Vista

Senior career*
Years	Team	Apps	(Gls)
2007–2010	Cerro	24	(2)
2010	Boston River	2	(0)
2011–2012	Huracán	31	(6)
2012	Alianza	9	(3)
2012–2014	Santa Tecla	49	(13)
2014	Dragón	4	(1)
2014	Huracán	7	(5)
2014	Sriwijaya	0	(0)
2015	Guabirá		
2015–2016	Huracán	5	(2)
2016	Chalatenango	3	(0)
2016	Boyacá Chicó	5	(0)
2017	Progreso	16	(5)
2018	Oriental	15	(6)
2018–2019	Deportivo Carchá		
2019	Potencia		
2019–	Bella Vista	7	(0)
- * Club domestic league appearances and goals as of 15:23, 8 January 2020 (UTC)

Christian Andrés Vaquero Abad (born 8 January 1986) is a Uruguayan professional footballer who plays as a forward for C.A. Bella Vista.
