= Williams Reyes =

Honduran-born Salvadoran footballer (born 197)

Personal information
- Full name: Williams Enrique Reyes Rodríguez
- Date of birth: October 30, 1976 (age 50)
- Place of birth: La Ceiba, Honduras
- Height: 1.72 m (5 ft 8 in)
- Position: Forward

Senior career*
Years	Team	Apps	(Gls)
1997–2000	Deportes Savio		
2000–2001	CD Dragón	36	(26)
2001–2005	CD FAS	200	(103)
2005–2009	AD Isidro Metapán	159	(74)
2009–2013	CD FAS	84	(36)
2013–2014	CD Dragón	35	(22)
2014–2015	CD Águila	38	(13)
2015–2016	Juventud Independiente	24	(10)
2016–2017	CD Luis Ángel Firpo	17	(4)
2017	CD Chalatenango	39	(7)
2017–2021	CD Aspirante		(64)

International career
2008–2009	El Salvador	17	(0)
- * Club domestic league appearances and goals

Williams Enrique Reyes Rodríguez (born October 30, 1976) is a Honduran-born Salvadoran professional footballer who played as a forward.

== Club career ==
Reyes started his professional career at Deportes Savio, but crossed the Salvadoran border to play for Dragón in 2000.

After only a year he moved on to FAS, with whom he would win 5 national league titles.

In 2005, he joined Isidro Metapán to win three titles more, only to rejoin FAS in 2009 and add another championship.

In January 2014, Reyes left FAS to rejoin Dragón, but he switched allegiance and joined local rival Águila for the 2015 Clausura season.

== International career ==
Reyes played once for his native Honduras against a Hong Kong League XI during the 2004 Carlsberg Cup but never played in any official FIFA acknowledged match for them.

In fact, he made his debut for El Salvador in a June 2008 FIFA World Cup qualification match against Panama and has earned a total of 17 caps, scoring no goals.

He has represented his adopted country in 10 FIFA World Cup qualification matches and played at the 2009 CONCACAF Gold Cup.

His final international game was an October 2009 FIFA World Cup qualification match against Honduras.

== Honours ==
FAS

- Primera Division (6): Clausura 2002, Apertura 2002, Apertura 2003, Apertura 2004, Clausura 2005, Apertura 2009

Isidro Metapán

- Primera División: Clausura 2007, Apertura 2008, Clausura 2009

Individual

- Salvadoran Primera División top scorer (6): Apertura 2000 (17), Clausura 2004 (14), Apertura 2007 (11), 2008 Clausura (14), 2009 Apertura (11), and Apertura 2014(13)
