= Sean Fraser (Jamaican footballer) =

Jamaican soccer player (born 1983)

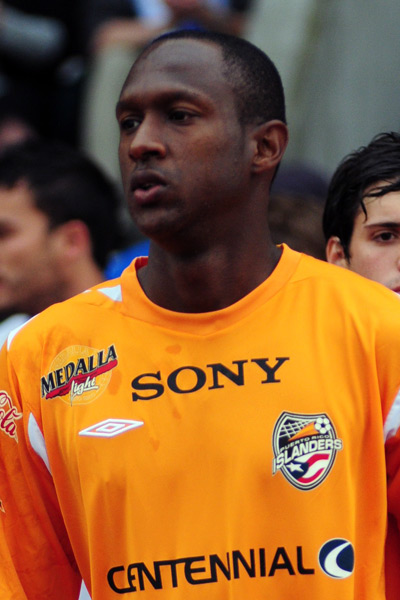

Personal information
- Full name: Sean Peter Roy Fraser
- Date of birth: 15 February 1983 (age 43)
- Place of birth: Kingston, Jamaica
- Height: 5 ft 11 in (1.80 m)
- Position: Forward

Team information
- Current team: Harbour View

Youth career
- 1996–2001: Clarendon College

Senior career*
Years	Team	Apps	(Gls)
2000–2004	Harbour View		
2004–2006	Portmore United		
2006–2008	Miami FC	68	(11)
2007	→ Boavista (loan)	7	(2)
2009	Puerto Rico Islanders	25	(3)
2010–2011	North East Stars	4	(2)
2011	Once Municipal	20	(15)
2012	Alianza	37	(21)
2013	Pumas Morelos	12	(4)
2013	Alianza	33	(13)
2014–2015	Águila	18	(2)
2015	Dragón	11	(3)
2015–2016	SHB-Đà Nẵng	14	(8)
2016–2017	Samut Songkhram		
2017–2019	Harbour View	2	(2)

International career
1999	Jamaica U-17		
2001	Jamaica U-20		
2000–2012	Jamaica	9	(0)
- * Club domestic league appearances and goals as of 12 March 2017 (UTC)

Sean Fraser (born 15 February 1983) is a retired Jamaican soccer player who last played for Harbour View.

== Career ==
=== Youth ===
Fraser attended Camperdown High School, Vas Preparatory School, and attended Clarendon College in his native Jamaica, where he was a star player on the school's football team.

=== Professional ===
Fraser began his professional career on the Jamaica National Premier League, playing for Harbour View and Portmore United. He transferred to Miami FC in the USL First Division in 2006 then went on loan to Brazilian club Boavista in Campeonato Carioca.

After two seasons in Florida, Fraser transferred to the Puerto Rico Islanders in January 2009. After one year with the Islanders Fraser signed with North East Stars in Trinidad. In 2011, Fraser joined Once Municipal in El Salvador but moved on to fellow Salvadorans Alianza before the start of the 2012 Clausura championship.

In January 2013, Fraser moved to Pumas Morelos in the AscensoMX

In July 2013, Fraser returned to Alianza in El Salvador

== International ==
Fraser played for Jamaica in the 1999 FIFA U-17 World Championship in New Zealand, appeared for the Jamaica U-20 team in the 2001 FIFA World Youth Championship in Argentina, and made his debut for the Jamaica national team in 2000 against the Cayman Islands. He was also part of the Jamaica national team that participated in the qualifying round of the Digicel Caribbean Cup in 2001.

== Honors ==
=== Club ===
First Jamaican born and Caribbean player to win a golden boot award in Central America.

Puerto Rico Islanders

- CFU Club Championship: Runner-up 2009
