= Gonzalo Mazzia =

Argentine footballer

Personal information
- Full name: Gonzalo Daniel Mazzia
- Date of birth: 13 January 1987 (age 39)
- Place of birth: Rosario, Santa Fe, Argentina
- Height: 1.69 m (5 ft 7 in)
- Position: Forward

Senior career*
Years	Team	Apps	(Gls)
2006–2008	Newell's Old Boys (reserves)		
2008–2010	Sociedad Tiro Suizo Rosario		
2010–2011	Argentino de Rosario	30	(19)
2011–2012	Huracán de Comodoro Rivadavia	30	(14)
2012–2013	Atlético Marte	35	(17)
2013–2014	FAS		
2015	Juventud Unida Universitario		
2016	ADIUR		
- * Club domestic league appearances and goals

Gonzalo Daniel Mazzia (born 13 January 1987) is an Argentine former professional footballer who played as a forward.
