= Jesús Toscanini =

Uruguayan footballer (born 1987)

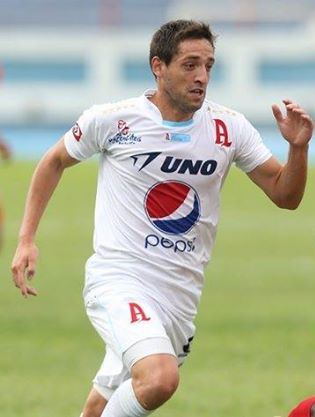
- Toscanini in 2014

Personal information
- Full name: Jesús Daniel Toscanini Correa
- Date of birth: 11 December 1987 (age 38)
- Place of birth: Rocha, Uruguay
- Height: 1.78 m (5 ft 10 in)
- Position: Forward

Youth career
- Rocha

Senior career*
Years	Team	Apps	(Gls)
2004–2007	Rocha	41	(4)
2007–2008	Miramar Misiones	6	(1)
2008	Everton Viña del Mar	1	(0)
2009	Tacuarembó	2	(0)
2009–2010	Montevideo Wanderers	6	(1)
2011	Jorge Wilstermann	0	(0)
2011–2012	Sud América	23	(5)
2012–2013	Torque	24	(15)
2013–2014	Juventud Independiente	32	(20)
2014	Alianza	16	(5)
2015	Atlético Huila	2	(0)
2016	Rampla Juniors	4	(0)
2016	Municipal Limeño		
2017	OPS	3	(0)
2017–2018	Juventud 25 Septiembre		
2018–2019	Montañeros	27	(13)
2019–2020	San Roque Lepe	36	(11)
2020–2021	Jerez	12	(0)

Managerial career
- 2022–2024: Eldense C
- 2024–2025: Eldense B
- * Club domestic league appearances and goals

Jesús Daniel Toscanini Correa (born 11 December 1987) is a Uruguayan football manager and former player who played as a forward.
