= Augustine Jibrin =

Nigerian footballer

Personal information
- Date of birth: 7 October 1988 (age 38)
- Place of birth: Nigeria
- Height: 1.84 m (6 ft 0 in)
- Position: Centre-back

Team information
- Current team: Villan Pojat (manager)

Senior career*
Years	Team	Apps	(Gls)
2006–2008	NAF Rockets	5	(0)
2008–2009	OPA	24	(0)
2009–2011	OPS	51	(3)
2012	VPS	17	(0)
2013	OPS	17	(1)
2013–2014	Juventud Independiente		
2015	Alianza	?	(?)
2015–2016	Kristianstads FF	4	(0)
2016–2017	OPS	43	(2)
2018–2019	OLS	3	(0)

Managerial career
- 2019: OLS
- ~2022: Oulu Nice Soccer C youth
- 2023–?: OTP
- 2025–: Villan Pojat
- * Club domestic league appearances and goals as of 27 May 2018

Augustine Jibrin (born 7 October 1988) is a Nigerian football manager and former player who is the manager of Finnish club Villan Pojat. He played as a centre-back. While in Finland he captained FC OPA and OPS already at the age of 21.

He was one of the very few foreign captains in Finnish professional football.

== Career ==
In the seasons 2009 to 2011 Jibrin played for Finnish club OPS. Following a one-year stint at VPS, where he made 17 appearances while struggling with an ankle injury, he returned to OPS in 2013.

In 2022 as coach of the C youth of Oulu Nice Soccer he led the team to the national championship title. Six players of the team were selected for the Finland under-16 national team.

Jibrin was appointed head coach at Villan Pojat in November 2025.

== Honours ==
Individual

- Liga El Salvador Team of the year: 2013–14
