= Héctor Ramos =

Puerto Rican footballer

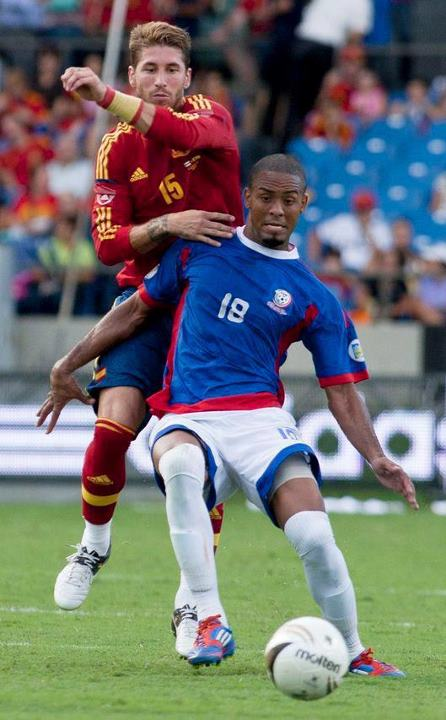
- Ramos (right) and Sergio Ramos in a Puerto Rico vs. Spain match in 2012

Personal information
- Full name: Héctor Omar Ramos Lebrón
- Date of birth: 4 May 1990 (age 36)
- Place of birth: Maunabo, Puerto Rico
- Height: 6 ft 1 1/2 in (1.87 m)
- Position: Forward

Team information
- Current team: Metropolitan FA
- Number: 99

Youth career
- 2003–2008: Puerto Rico Islanders C

Senior career*
Years	Team	Apps	(Gls)
2008–2009	Sevilla Bayamón	14	(6)
2010–2011	Alacranes Del Norte	14	(6)
2011	Puerto Rico United	3	(3)
2011	Criollos de Caguas	9	(3)
2011	→ Puerto Rico Islanders (loan)	2	(0)
2012–2013	Puerto Rico Islanders	22	(3)
2013–2015	Isidro Metapán	79	(31)
2015	Al-Qadisiyah	2	(0)
2016	Águila	13	(6)
2016–2017	Puerto Rico FC	40	(12)
2018	Sabah	18	(14)
2019	Don Bosco FC	17	(11)
2019	Alianza	10	(2)
2020	Sabah	1	(0)
2020–	Metropolitan	75	(55)
Total		319	(152)

International career^{‡}
2007	Puerto Rico U17	3	(0)
2010	Puerto Rico U21	2	(2)
2011	Puerto Rico U23	2	(1)
2010–2019	Puerto Rico	36	(18)
- * Club domestic league appearances and goals ‡ National team caps and goals as of 10 February 2020

Héctor Omar Ramos Lebrón (born 4 May 1990), also known as Pito Ramos or simply Pito, is a Puerto Rican professional footballer who plays as a forward for LPR club Metropolitan FA.

== Club career ==
=== Puerto Rico United ===
Ramos began 2011 playing for Puerto Rico United.

=== Criollos de Caguas ===
==== 2011: Loan to Puerto Rico Islanders ====
Ramos later joined Puerto Rico Islanders in September 2011 on loan from Criollos de Caguas.

=== Puerto Rico Islanders ===
He signed with Islanders for the 2012 season on 20 January 2012.

=== Isidro Metapán ===
On 5 July 2013, it was confirmed that Ramos would be the third foreign player for Salvadoran club, Isidro Metapán.

=== Puerto Rico FC ===
Ramos joined the newly formed Puerto Rico FC ahead of their Fall 2016 season. He scored the first goal in club history on his debut against the Indy Eleven, earning the team a draw. He was released at the end of the 2017 season.

=== Sabah ===
In 2018 and 2020 Ramos played for Malaysian team, Sabah FA.

== International career ==
On 4 October 2010, in the first first round of the 2010 Caribbean Cup qualification against Saint Martin, Ramos came on as a substitute at the 83rd minute for Christopher Feigenbaum in a 2–0 win.

== Personal life ==
He is the older brother of professional baseball players Heliot Ramos and Henry Ramos.

== Career statistics ==
=== International goals ===
Scores and results list Puerto Rico's goal tally first.

No.	Date	Venue	Opponent	Score	Result	Competition
1.	11 November 2011	Juan Ramón Loubriel Stadium, Bayamón, Puerto Rico	Saint Lucia	2–0	4–0	2014 FIFA World Cup qualification
2.	11 November 2011	Juan Ramón Loubriel Stadium, Bayamón, Puerto Rico	Saint Lucia	3–0	4–0	2014 FIFA World Cup qualification
3.	14 November 2011	Mayagüez Athletics Stadium, Mayagüez, Puerto Rico	Saint Lucia	1–0	3–0	2014 FIFA World Cup qualification
4.	14 November 2011	Mayagüez Athletics Stadium, Mayagüez, Puerto Rico	Saint Lucia	2–0	3–0	2014 FIFA World Cup qualification
5.	7 September 2012	Stade Sylvio Cator, Port-au-Prince, Haiti	Bermuda	2–1	2–1	2012 Caribbean Cup qualification
6.	9 September 2012	Stade Sylvio Cator, Port-au-Prince, Haiti	Saint Martin	1–0	9–0	2012 Caribbean Cup qualification
7.	9 September 2012	Stade Sylvio Cator, Port-au-Prince, Haiti	Saint Martin	3–0	9–0	2012 Caribbean Cup qualification
8.	9 September 2012	Stade Sylvio Cator, Port-au-Prince, Haiti	Saint Martin	5–0	9–0	2012 Caribbean Cup qualification
9.	9 September 2012	Stade Sylvio Cator, Port-au-Prince, Haiti	Saint Martin	8–0	9–0	2012 Caribbean Cup qualification
10.	23 October 2012	Stade René Serge Nabajoth, Les Abymes, Guadeloupe	Martinique	1–2	1–2	2012 Caribbean Cup qualification
11.	25 October 2012	Stade René Serge Nabajoth, Les Abymes, Guadeloupe	Guadeloupe	1–4	1–4	2012 Caribbean Cup qualification
12.	5 September 2014	Juan Ramón Loubriel Stadium, Bayamón, Puerto Rico	French Guiana	1–0	1–2	2014 Caribbean Cup qualification
13.	7 September 2014	Juan Ramón Loubriel Stadium, Bayamón, Puerto Rico	Grenada	1–0	2–2	2014 Caribbean Cup qualification
14.	1 June 2016	Grenada National Stadium, St. George's, Grenada	Grenada	1–3	3–3	2017 Caribbean Cup qualification
15.	1 June 2016	Grenada National Stadium, St. George's, Grenada	Grenada	2–3	3–3	2017 Caribbean Cup qualification
16.	4 June 2016	Juan Ramón Loubriel Stadium, Bayamón, Puerto Rico	Antigua and Barbuda	1–0	2–1	2017 Caribbean Cup qualification
17.	4 June 2016	Juan Ramón Loubriel Stadium, Bayamón, Puerto Rico	Antigua and Barbuda	2–1	2–1	2017 Caribbean Cup qualification
18.	11 October 2016	Juan Ramón Loubriel Stadium, Bayamón, Puerto Rico	Curaçao	1–0	2–4	2017 Caribbean Cup qualification
Last updated 20 August 2017
