= Juan Francisco Barraza Stadium =

Stadium in San Miguel, El Salvador

Coordinates: 13°28′57″N 88°10′09″W

Estadio Juan Francisco Barraza
- Nido Aguilucho "Eaglet's Nest"
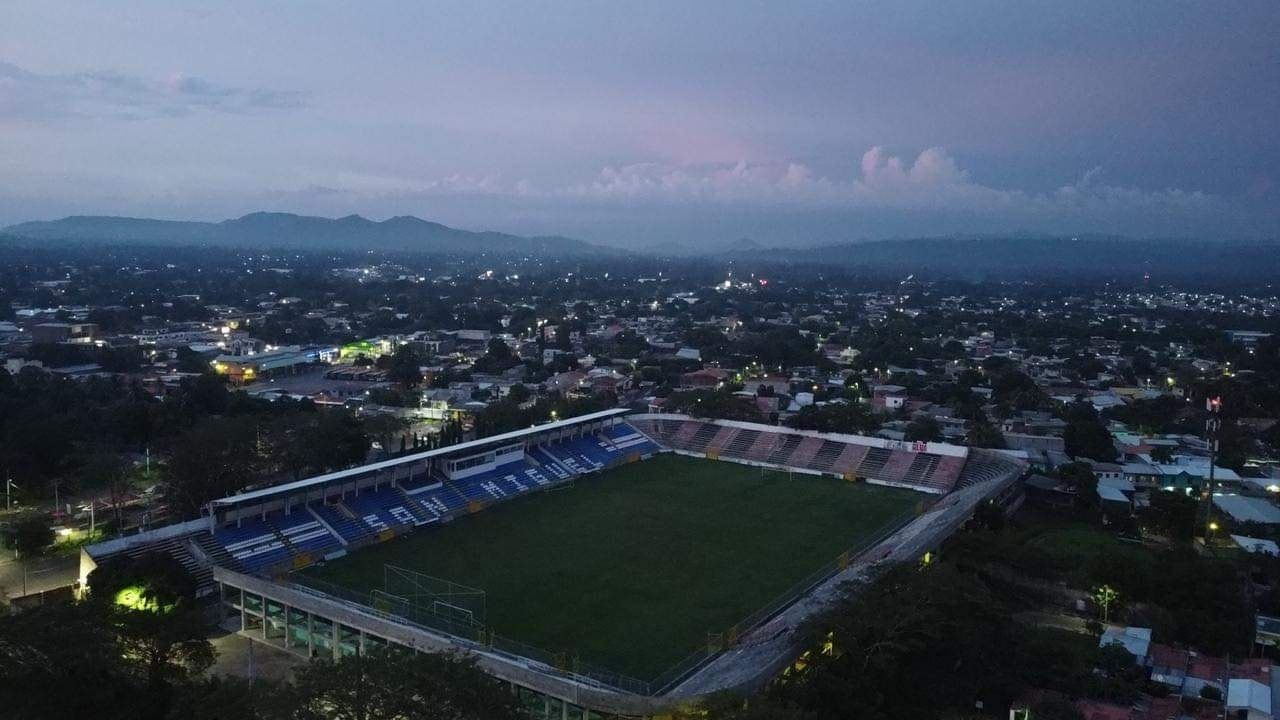
- Interactive map of Estadio Juan Francisco Barraza
- Full name: Estadio Municipal Juan Francisco Barraza
- Former names: Estadio Migueleño
- Location: San Miguel, El Salvador
- Owner: Mayor of San Miguel
- Capacity: 14,000
- Surface: Grass
- Field size: 105 m × 67 m (344 ft × 220 ft)

Construction
- Built: 15 November 1956
- Renovated: 2016–2017
- Cost: US$ 43,558.34
- Architect: Paredes Lemus

Tenants
- CD Águila (1956–2016, 2017–present); CD Dragón (1956–2016, 2017–present); El Salvador national football team (selected matches)

Juan Francisco Barraza Stadium (Spanish: Estadio Juan Francisco Barraza) is a multi-purpose stadium in San Miguel, El Salvador. It is currently used mostly for football matches and is the home stadium of C.D. Águila and C.D. Dragón. It is named after the 1950s star Juan Francisco "Cariota" Barraza in 1982. The stadium holds 14,000 people.

== History ==
Construction began in November 1956 and was under the direction of Pablo Paredes Lemus and Cia. After 3 years of building, The stadium was opened and held its very first game on November 15, 1959. This day saw Honduran Club Deportivo Olimpia play against Águila and drew 1-1. In 1982, 26 years after its construction, the Aguila board, decided to change its name to Estadio Juan Francisco Barraza, after the iconic footballer in El Salvador.
