= C.D. Dragón =

Association football club in El Salvador

- Full name: Club Deportivo Dragón
- Nicknames: Los Mitológicos; El Monstruo Verde; Escupefuego
- Founded: 18 September 1939; 87 years ago
- Ground: Estadio Juan Francisco Barraza
- Capacity: 10,000
- Chairman: (El Salvador) Lic. Renè Ventura
- Manager: (Uruguay) Pablo Quiñones
- League: (El Salvador) Liga de Ascenso
- 2025 Clausura: Overall: 10th Playoffs: Did not qualify
Home colours	Away colours	Third colours

Club Deportivo Dragón is a Salvadoran football club, based in San Miguel, El Salvador; founded in 1939. Dragón has won the league title twice in the 1951 and 1953 and finished as runner-up on three occasions.

CD Dragón have played their home games at the 10,000 capacity Estadio Juan Francisco Barraza since 1956 when the stadium was built.

Their traditional home kit consists of Green and White shirts (striped) with white shorts and green socks.

The club has a long-standing rivalry with national opponents Águila, and matches between the two sides are known as the "Derby Migueleño".

The club currently plays in the Liga de Ascenso.

== History ==
C.D. Dragón was founded on 18 September 1939; during this period no national league was available, so they played against teams from different zones. Dragón represented San Miguel department. Dragón played their matches at the Estadio Charlaix, which would be their home stadium for several decades. Under the coaching of player-coach Esteban Blanco, the direction of Samuel Córdoba and key players such as Juan Francisco Barraza, Rómulo Granados and Domingo Flores, the club experienced their most successful period in the 1950s, when they won two league titles (1950–51, 1953–53) and lost two other championship finals.

However, Dragón's fortune would change when a new club was founded during the latter part of the 1950s, Águila. Águila began to assume the mantle as the top representative of San Miguel and began to drain Dragón of quality players such as (Barraza, Blanco and others), sponsorship and fans which led to Dragón not only developing a fierce rivalry with Águila but also led to the club being relegated to the Second Division after the conclusion of the 1963–64 season.

The club spent 13 years in the Second Division, during this time they were one of the founding members of UCLA (Unión de Clubes de Liga de Ascenso) in 1971. However, on 12 February 1977, under Brazilian coach Jorge Tupinambá who had previously coached ANTEL and Platense to the First Division, helped Dragón win their promotion game against Santiagueño 1–0 and helped elevate Dragón back to the First Division.

Dragón's stay in the First Division was a short one (four years), the club only achieved two final series participations during the 1977–78, 1978–79 where they were quickly eliminated and the club was relegated to the Second Division after the conclusion of the 1980 season.

Under the coaching of former player and idol Juan Francisco Barraza, the club almost achieved promotion back to the First Division during the 1984–85 season; however, they lost their promotion game to CESSA and had to wait another four years to gain promotion.

Mario Martínez, whose name will become entwined with Dragón, helped the club gain promotion to the First Division thanks to a 2–1 aggregate victory over Halcón de San Cayetano Istepeque, during this period a new crop of talented players were identified including future highest goalscorer for the El Salvador national football team Raúl Díaz Arce, Moisés "Pecho de Mono" González, and others. Despite the success, the club were struck with financial troubles and had to sell those players and in just one season the club was relegated back to the Second Division.

The club waited four years to achieve promotion once again thanks to the coaching of Miguel Aguilar Obando, who helped Dragón win their promotion game 4–0 over Arcense.

Their most recent spell in the top tier lasted from 1996 through 2003; during this period several players shone including Honduran Williams Reyes, William Torres and others and they achieved a few final series. However they were relegated back in 2003 to the Second Division and have played there for ten years.

Dragón won promotion to the First Division mainly due to the coaching of Mario Martínez second time in which he helped C.D. Dragón gain promotion, Dragón defeated Ciclón del Golfo over the two legs with an aggregate score of 3–1.

Despite having a very poor Apertura campaign in which Mario Martínez was sacked and replaced by Nelson Ancheta, with the recruitment of club legend Williams Reyes and the emergence of stars like Rommel Mejía, Santos Ortíz, and Aurelio Vásquez the club reached the Clausura grand final (after disposing Santa Tecla in a play-off series 2–1, and defeating league leaders FAS in the semi-finals 1–0 on aggregate), However, despite the game ending 0–0 after 120 minutes, two missed penalties in the shootout meant that Isidro Metapán would win the grand final 6–5 on penalties.

On 29 of May, 2016, the club had its most successful period in its modern history under the guidance of Salvadorian Omar Sevilla, the club were able to win their first championship in 63 years (the Clausura 2016 final). Dragón won the match 1–0, Wilman Torres was the lone goal-scorer for Dragón in the final..

However, despite winning their first championship in 63 years their fortune dwindled first showed a poor international performance at the concacaf losing 3 games and drawing one, with 6–0 loss against Deportivo Saprissa being the worst of the result.

Soon the club struggled to win games and eventually during the 2017–2018 season, the club finished equal 12th with Sonsonate, this meant they were forced to play a relegation playoff game with Sonsonate, they lost 3–2, which meant they to fell back to the Segunda division.

On the 14th of January, 2018 due to failed payment to player, the club would not be registered and caused the club to be de-registered from the Segunda Division .

After a change of coach, hiring Marvin Benites and mixing a blend of experience and youth. Dragon won the Clausura 2022 tournament defeating Inter SS 2-1, with the goals coming from Javier Fermán and Henry Álvarez.

On 6 June 2022, after 4 years out of the Primera Division, Dragon were promoted back to the top flight following a 4-2 playoff victory against Apertura 2021 champion AD Municipal 4-2 with goals coming from Kevin Moreno, Henry Álvarez and a double from Romel Mejía.

On May 31, It was announced that Inter Formando un Atleta had purchased Dragon in the Primera Division in the Apertura 2025. On June 12, 2025 Dragon announced they would be taking Once Lobos spot in the Segunda Division for the Apertura 2025.

== Performance in CONCACAF competitions ==
- CONCACAF Champions League: 1 appearances

Best: Group stage in 2016
2016–17 : Group stage

=== Historical Matches ===
November 16, 1952 Friendly	C.D. Dragon	2−0	C.S. Uruguay de Coronado	San Salvador, El Salvador
	Esteban Blanco; Juan Francisco Barraza		Nil	Stadium: TBD

January 4, 1953 Friendly	C.D. Dragon	0−6	Racing Club	San Salvador, El Salvador
	Nil		Juan José Pizzuti; Cipolla; Mario Boyé	Stadium: TBD

July 28, 1957 Friendly	C.D. Dragon	0−6	Troya	Chinameca, El Salvador
	Nil		Goal	Stadium: TBD

=== International level ===
- As of 13 March 2025

Opponent	First meeting	Last Meeting	Pld	W	D	L	GF	GA	GD
(Costa Rica) Saprissa	August 18, 2016	August 25, 2016	2	0	1	1	0	6	−6
(United States) Portland Timbers	August 2, 2016	September 27, 2016	2	0	0	2	2	4	−2
Totals			4	0	1	3	2	10	−8

== Stadium ==
- Estadio Juan Francisco Barraza (1956–Present)
  - Estadio Jose Ramon Flores; Santa Rosa de Lima (2016–2017) games played in this location, during the renovation of the Estadio Juan Francisco Barraza
  - Estadio Charlaix; San Miguel (1939–55) Dragón home ground before moving to the Estadio Juan Francisco Barraza.
  - Estadio Flor Blanca; San Salvador (TBD) International games prior to the building of Estadio Cuscatlán.
  - Estadio Cuscatlán; San Salvador (2016) games played in this location for CONCACAF Champion League games, during the renovation of the Estadio Juan Francisco Barraza
  - Cancha de Chapeltique (2017) games played in this location, during the renovation of the Estadio Juan Francisco Barraza
  - Estadio Municipal de Quelepa (2025-Present) games played in this location, during the renovation of the Estadio Juan Francisco Barraza

Dragón plays its home games at Estadio Juan Francisco Barraza located in San Miguel, The stadium has a capacity of 10,000 people.

=== Supporters ===
There is currently one officially recognized supporters group, El Monstruo Verde.

=== Mascot ===
Throughout their history, a dragon was the club's official mascot. On March 9, 2014, the club, after consultation with the fans, decided to call their mascot Mito .

=== Rivalries ===
Dragón's main rival is Águila. The derby has been labelled Derbi Migueleño (the San Miguel Derby). The intense feelings between the two sides began early on due to the close proximity and the switching of players between the clubs. The biggest defection occurred in the 1950s when legendary players Juan Francisco Barraza, Esteban Blanco and left the championship side of Dragon to Aguila and started a dynasty. The sole final played between the two teams ended 1–0 to Dragon. The most recent match was a 4-1 victory by Aguila on the 27 of March, 2025.

The teams have played 87 matches in all competitions, Aguila winning 52, Dragon 12, and the remaining 24 having been drawn.

== Sponsorship ==
Companies that Dragon currently has sponsorship deals with for 2026–2027 includes:

- TBD – Official kit suppliers
- Hotel Marbella Restaurante y Bar – Official sponsors
- Pollo Campenese – Official sponsors
- Fisiolaser – Official sponsors
- Farmancia San Rey – Official sponsors
- Natiluss Gym – Official sponsors
- Al Horno – Official sponsors
- Las Perlitas – Official sponsors

== Honours ==
Dragon is historically the second most successful team from San Miguel in El Salvador football, as they have won the second most championships with 3 titles.

=== Domestic honours ===
==== Leagues ====
- Primera División Salvadorean and predecessors
  - Champions (3): 1950–51, 1952–53, 2016 Clausura
- Segunda División Salvadorean and predecessors
  - Champions (5): 1977, 1988–89, 1994–95, 2013 Clausura, 2022 Clausura
  - Play-off winners: 2021–22
  - Runners up (1): Apertura 2025
- Tercera División Salvadorean and predecessors
  - Champions (1): Clausura 2013

==== Minor Cups ====
- El Salvador Benefit Tournament
  - Champions (1): 2000
- Copa de la Historia
  - Champions (1): 2015
- Copa Roberto "Burra" Rivas
  - Champions (1): 2016

== Current squad ==
As of August 2026

Note: Flags indicate national team as defined under FIFA eligibility rules; some limited exceptions apply. Players may hold more than one non-FIFA nationality.

No.	Pos.	Nation	Player
1	GK	ESA	Dimas Hernandez
2		ESA	Aaron Mendoza
3		ESA	Nelson Flores
4		ESA	Luis Platero
5		ESA	César Guevara (Captain)
6		ESA	Jonhan Chavarria
7		ESA	Jorge Silva
8		ESA	Bryan Argueta
10		ESA	Oscar Hernandez
11		ESA	Omar Ramos
12		ESA	Alexis Manuel Cálix

No.	Pos.	Nation	Player
14		ESA	Angel Anaya
15		ESA	Salvador Vásquez
16		ESA	Gerson Perez
20		ESA	Saubdiel Barahona
21		ESA	Miguel Guevara
22	GK	ESA	Yetson Alcides Batrés
24		ESA	Martin Torres
25		ESA	Nelson Ceren
26		ESA	Wilfredo Caceres
28		ESA	Franklin Gomez

=== Players with dual citizenship ===
- (El Salvador) (United States) Cristian Alexander Elias

=== Out on loan ===
Note: Flags indicate national team as defined under FIFA eligibility rules; some limited exceptions apply. Players may hold more than one non-FIFA nationality.

No.	Pos.	Nation	Player
—		ESA	TBD (at TBD for the 2023-24 Apertura and Clausura)

=== In ===
Note: Flags indicate national team as defined under FIFA eligibility rules; some limited exceptions apply. Players may hold more than one non-FIFA nationality.

No.	Pos.	Nation	Player
—		ESA	Nahum Sanchez (From TBD)
—		ESA	Victor Sanchez (From TBD)
—	FW	HON	Jerrye Castillo (From Real San Martin)
—	MF	ESA	Nelson Ceren (From Racing de Gualuca)
—	FW	ESA	Saubdiel Barahona (From Vista Hermosa)

No.	Pos.	Nation	Player
—	MF	ESA	Juan Hernandez (From Brasil FC)
—	MF	ESA	Oscar Hernandez (From 11 Aguilas del Sur)
—		ESA	(From TBD)

=== Out ===
Note: Flags indicate national team as defined under FIFA eligibility rules; some limited exceptions apply. Players may hold more than one non-FIFA nationality.

No.	Pos.	Nation	Player
—		COL	Yerson Tobar (To Atletico Balboa)
—		ESA	Joshua Alfaro (To El Vencedor)
—		ESA	Isai Saravia (To TBD)
—		ESA	Luis Méndez (To TBD)
—		ESA	Geovanny Molina (To TBD)
—		ESA	Zuriel Meléndez (To TBD)

No.	Pos.	Nation	Player
—		ESA	Luis Ricardo Flores (To TBD)
—		ESA	José Herrera (To TBD)
—		ESA	Daniel Claros (To TBD)
—		ESA	Edwin Flores (To TBD)
—		ESA	Andrew Vásquez (To TBD)

== Personnel ==
=== Coaching staff ===
As of August 2026

Position	Staff
Manager	(El Salvador) Manuel Acevedo *
Assistant Managers	(El Salvador) Oswaldo Franco *
Goalkeeping Coach	(El Salvador) Atilo Pineda *
Reserve Manager And Ladies Manager	(El Salvador) Nil
Under 17 Manager	(El Salvador) Nil
Fitness Coach	(El Salvador) Alex Portilo (*)
Team Doctor	(El Salvador) TBD
Sports Director	(El Salvador) TBD
Physiotherapist	(El Salvador) TBD

== Management ==
As of December 2024

Position	Staff
Owner	(El Salvador) Municipal Association of Chapeltique
President	(El Salvador) Martin Herrera (*)
Vice President	(El Salvador) Rene Jose Ayala (*)
Administrative Manager	(El Salvador) TBD
TBD	(El Salvador) Jonathan Torres
TBD	(El Salvador) TBD
TBD	(El Salvador) TBD

== Notable players ==
=== Team captains ===
Name	Years
(El Salvador)	19
(El Salvador)	19
(El Salvador)	19
(El Salvador) Pedro Flores	1976
(El Salvador) Elmer Rosas	1978
(El Salvador) Julio Urrutia	1979
(Uruguay) Asdrubal Padin	1988-90
(El Salvador) Marvin Torres	1991-1992
(Uruguay) Oscar Suarez	1995-1997
(El Salvador) Daniel Sagastizado	1997-1998
(El Salvador) Orlando Martinez Mingo	1998
(El Salvador) Williams Reyes	2014
(Colombia) Johnny Rios	2015
(El Salvador) Luis Miguel Hernández	2016
(El Salvador) Manuel Gonzalez	2017
(El Salvador) Pastor Melgar	2018
(El Salvador) Herberth Ulloa	2021- June 2022
(El Salvador) Felipe Amaya	June 2022 - December 2022
(El Salvador) Marvin Ramos	January 2023 - December 2023
(El Salvador) Felipe Amaya	January 2024 - June 2024
(Colombia) Kevin Moreno	June 2024 - December 2024
(El Salvador) Francisco Escobar	January 2025 - December 2025
(El Salvador) Luis Mendez	January 2026 - July 2026
(El Salvador) César Guevara	August 2026 -Present

=== Foreign players ===
Players with senior international caps:

- (Costa Rica) Pedro Cubillo (1996)
- (Costa Rica) Mon Rodríguez (1958–1959)
- (Honduras) Eduardo Arriola (2002-2003)
- (Honduras) Georgie Welcome (2017)
- (Honduras) Óscar Lagos (2001–2003)
- (Jamaica) Sean Fraser (2015)

=== World cup players ===
This list all the players that have represented their respective national teams at the World cup. Those in Bold were playing with Dragonwhen they played

- (El Salvador) Salvador Flamenco
- (El Salvador) Ramón Fagoaga
- (Honduras) Georgie Welcome

== Notable managers ==
The club's current manager is Oswaldo Franco. There have been TBD permanent and TBD caretaker managers of Dragon since the appointment of the club's first professional manager, Jorge El Choco Méndez in 1951. The club's longest-serving manager, in terms of both length of tenure and number of games overseen, is Jose Mario Martinez, who managed the club between 1996 and 2018. Argentinian Gregorio Bundio was also Dragon's first manager from outside the El Salvador. Overall Jose Mario Martinez is the club's most successful coach, winning two Segunda División Salvadorean, Followed by one title each in the Primera División by Jorge El Choco Méndez, Miguel Herrera and Omar Sevilla.

The following managers won at least one trophy when in charge of Dragon
Name	Period	Trophies
(El Salvador) Jose Mario Martínez	1987–1989, 1995, 2003, 2009 – October 2009, June 2012 – August 2013, Nov 2019- 2020, 2021	2 Segunda División Salvadorean
(El Salvador) Jorge (El Choco) Méndez	1950–51	1 Primera División de Fútbol Profesional
(El Salvador) Miguel Herrera	1951–53	1 Primera División de Fútbol Profesional
(El Salvador) Omar Sevilla	June 2015 – September 2016	1 Primera División de Fútbol Profesional (2016 Clausura)
(Brazil) Jorge Tupinambá	1976–1978	1 Segunda División Salvadorean ()
(El Salvador) Nelson Ancheta	August 2013- May 2014, September 2016 – February 2017	1 Runner-up in the Clausura 2014
(El Salvador) Marvin Benitez	January 2022 – December 2023; July 2024-September 2024; June 2025 - December 2025	1 Segunda División Salvadorean (2022 Clausura), 1 Play-off winner (2020-21), 1 Segunda División Salvadorean runner up (2025 Apertura)

== Records ==
- Debut in the primera division: 2–3 TBD, Estadio Santaneco, 1950s
- Highest league position: 1st in the Primera division (Apertura 1999, Apertura 2000)
- Best post season finish: Runners up (Apertura 1999, Apertura 2000)
- Record League victory: 7-1 v Chalatenango (Primera Division, February 2003)
- Largest Home victory, Primera División: 7-1 v Chalatenango, 2 February 2023
- Largest Away victory, Primera División: 3-0 v TBD, 29 October 2018
- Largest Home loss, Primera División: 1–3 v TBD, 4 November 2018
- Largest Away loss, Primera División: 1-4 v TBD, 7 April 2019
- Record attendance at Estadio Jose Ramon Flores : 25,133 v TBD, Primera Division (TBD)
- Most League appearances: 317, TBD (TBD)
- Most League goals scored: total, Tbd, TBD (1998–2003)
- Most League goals scored, season: 13,
- Worst season: TBD 2002-2003: 0 win, 0 draws and 0 losses (0 points)
- Debut in Concacaf Competition: 2016–17 CONCACAF Champions League
- First CONCACAF Champions League match: Dragon 1–2 Portland Timbers; TBD; 3, August 2016.
- Most wins in a row: TBD, TBD - TBD
- Most home wins in a row (all competitions): TBD, TBD– TBD
- Most home league wins in a row: TBD, TBD - TBD
- Most away wins in a row: TBD, TBD – TBD
- Most draws in a row: TBD, TBD
- Most home draws in a row: TBD, TBD
- Most away draws in a row: TBD, TBD
- Most defeats in a row: 8, TBD
- Most home defeats in a row: TBD, TBD
- Most away defeats in a row: TBD, TBD
- Longest unbeaten run: TBD, TBD
- Longest unbeaten run at home: TBD, TBD
- Longest unbeaten run away: TBD, TBD
- Longest winless run: 10 Games, 30 October 2024 – 12 February 2025
- Longest winless run at home: TBD, TBD – TBD
- Longest winless run away: TBD, TBD - TBD

=== Individual records ===
- Record appearances (all competitions): TBD, 822 from 1957 to 1975
- Record appearances (Primera Division): Paraguayan TBD, 64 from 2018 to 2019
- Most capped player for El Salvador: 68 (17 whilst at Dragon), Raúl Díaz Arce
- Most international caps for El Salvador while a Dragon player: 17, TBD
- Most caps won whilst at Dragon: 17, TBD.
- Record scorer in league: TBD, 77
- First goal scorer in International competition: Jamaican Kenrod Howell (v. Portland Timbers; TBD; 3 August 2020)
- Most goals in a season (all competitions): TBD, 62 (1927/28) (47 in League, 15 in Cup competitions)
- Most goals in a season (Primera Division):Raul Diaz Arce (1990-1991), 21
- Longest streak without conceding a goal: TBD 495 minutes (TBD)
- First international to play for Dragon– TBD, 1973 (El Salvador 1967-1972)
- First Dragon international – TBD (for El Salvador v TBD, 1940s)
- Fastest goal scored for Dragon: Uruguayan Jorge Garay (7 seconds) vs ADET, 1 May 2001
- Top goalscorer in CONCACAF competition: 1, Kevin Howell and Melara

=== Top goalscorers ===
No.	Player	period	Goals
1	(El Salvador) TBD	TBD-TBD	77
2	(El Salvador) Raul Diaz Arce	1989-1990	55
3	(El Salvador) Williams Reyes	2000, 2014	48
4	(Colombia) Jhon Montaño	2022-2023	28
5	(El Salvador) Javier Ferman	2022-2023	20
6	(Brazil) Jackson de Oliveira	2015-2016, 2018	19
7	(Uruguay) Carlos Villarreal	2000	18
8	(El Salvador) TBD	TBD-TBD	13
9	(El Salvador) TBD	TBD-TBD	12
10	(El Salvador) TBD	TBD-TBD	10
10	(Uruguay) Ruben Alonso	1995	10

Note: Players in bold text are still active with Dragon

=== Overall seasons table in Primera División de Fútbol Profesional ===
Pos.	Club	Season In D1	Pl.	W	D	L	GS	GA	Dif.
**TBA**	**C.D. Dragon**	**68**	1004	297	282	424	1281	1542	-261

Last updated: 21 March 2024

== Individual trophies ==
Nationality	First Name	Season	Number of Goals	Distinction Granted to the Player
El Salvador	Juan Francisco Barraza	1955	11 (Goals)	Top League scorer
El Salvador	Raúl Díaz	1990–91	21 (Goals)	Top League scorer
Honduras	Williams Reyes	2000	17 (Goals)	Top League scorer
Honduras	Williams Reyes	2014	13 (Goals)	Top League scorer

== Other departments ==
=== Football ===
==== Reserve team ====
The reserve team serves mainly as the final stepping stone for promising young players under the age of 21 before being promoted to the main team. The second team is coached by Marvin Rosales. the team played in the Primera División Reserves, The team greatest success was finishing runners-up in the Apertura 2024.

As of: December, 2025 Note: Flags indicate national team as defined under FIFA eligibility rules; some limited exceptions apply. Players may hold more than one non-FIFA nationality.

No.	Pos.	Nation	Player
—		ESA	
—		ESA	
—		ESA	
—		ESA	
—		ESA	
—		ESA	

No.	Pos.	Nation	Player
—		ESA	
—		ESA	
—		ESA	
—		ESA	
—		ESA	

Name	Nat	Tenure	Honours
Manuel Acevedo	(El Salvador)	December 2022 - November 2023	
Marvin Rosales	(El Salvador)	TBD - December 2024	Runner up (Apertura 2024)
David Paz	(El Salvador)	January 2025 - July 2025	
Hiatus	(El Salvador)	July 2025 - Present	

==== Junior teams ====
The youth team (under 17 and under 15) has produced some of El Salvador's top football players, including TBD and TBD. They are currently being coached by Salvadoran Luis Campos.

==== Women's team ====
The women's first team, which is led by head coach Manuel Acevedo, features several members of the El Salvador national ladies team. Their greatest successes were reaching the semi-finals the in Apertura 2020.

As of: December, 2025 Note: Flags indicate national team as defined under FIFA eligibility rules; some limited exceptions apply. Players may hold more than one non-FIFA nationality.

No.	Pos.	Nation	Player
—		ESA	
—		ESA	
—		ESA	
—		ESA	
—		ESA	
—		ESA	

No.	Pos.	Nation	Player
—		ESA	
—		ESA	
—		ESA	
—		ESA	
—		ESA	

Name	Nat	Tenure	Honours
Manuel Acevedo	(El Salvador)	TBD - December 2024	
Oswaldo Franco	(El Salvador)	January 2025 - July 2025	
Hiatus	(El Salvador)	July 2025 - Present	
