= List of foreign Primera División de El Salvador players (1998–present) =

This is a list of foreign players that have played in Primera División de Fútbol Profesional since 1998. For a list of foreign players who have played prior to the inception of the Apertura/Clausura format then check out Foreign Players (1926–1998).

The following players:

1. have played at least one official game for their respective clubs.
2. are listed as squad members for the current Clausura 2015 Season.
3. have not been capped for the El Salvador national team at any level.
4. includes uncapped players with dual nationality.

In italic: Players currently signed, but have yet to play a league match.

In Bold: Current foreign Primera División de Fútbol Profesional. players and their present team.

with *: Players who have represented their national team at a senior level.

== Naturalized players (Note: Players that have been born abroad, moved to El Salvador later than the age of twelve, acquired El Salvador citizenship and waived the opportunity to play for the national teams of their native countries in order to be eligible to play for El Salvador) ==
- (Mexico) Arturo Albarran – Alianza F.C., C.D. Águila, Atlético Marte, UES
- (Uruguay) Washington de la Cruz - Santa Clara, Alianza F.C.
- (Uruguay) Cristian Esnal - Juventud Independiente, UES
- (Colombia) Elder José Figueroa – C.D. Vista Hermosa, Atlético Balboa, Alianza F.C., Once Municipal, C.D. FAS, San Salvador F.C.
- (Nicaragua) Shawn Martin – C.D. Águila, A.D. Isidro Metapán
- (United States) Dustin Corea - C.D. FAS, C.D. Águila
- (United States) Richard Menjívar - C.D. Águila
- (United States) **Gerson Mayen** – C.D. FAS, Santa Tecla, C.D. Águila, Limeno, Zacatecoluca
- (United States) Carlos Menjívar – C.D. FAS, C.D. Águila, Once Municipal, A.D. Isidro Metapán, Limeno, Juventud Independiente
- (United States) Derby Carrillo – Santa Tecla
- (United States) Junior Burgos - FAS
- (Brazil) Marcelo Messias – C.D. Águila, C.D. FAS, C.D. Chalatenango, A.D. Isidro Metapán, Alianza F.C.
- (Brazil) Nildeson - Luis Ángel Firpo, C.D. Chalatenango, C.D. Águila, Atletico Balboa
- (Argentina) Emiliano Pedrozo - Santa Clara, FAS, Atlético Marte, San Salvador, Águila, Luis Ángel Firpo, Isidro Metapán, Nejapa
- (Brazil) Celio Rodríguez – C.D. Luis Ángel Firpo, El Roble
- (Socialist Federal Republic of Yugoslavia) Vladan Vićević – C.D. Águila
- (Jordan) Faisal Bisharat - Atlético Marte
- (Colombia) **Michell Mercado** - El Vencedor, Alianza F.C., LA Firpo

== Africa – CAF ==
=== Burundi ===
- Elias Dandi – Isidro Metapan

=== Cameroon ===
- Van Sebastian – Dragon (1999)
- Ban Ban Karim – Limeno
- Ayukokata També- Metapan

=== Equatorial Guinea ===
- Deogracias Abaga Edu Mangue – Atlético Marte

=== Gabon ===
- Didier Ovono (*) – Alianza

=== Ghana ===
- Emanuel Bentil – Isidro Metapan
- James Owusu-Ansah – Once Municipal, Atlético Marte, Firpo
- Mathius Mendy – Once Municipal
- Mohammed Issahaku – FAS

=== Nigeria ===
- Augustine Jibrin – Juventud Independiente
- Agustine Nwoko – Once Municipal
- Fredrick Ogangan - C.D. Municipal Limeno, Jocoro F.C., Independiente, C.D. Luis Angel Firpo

=== Sierra Leone ===
- Yussuf Sindeh – FAS

=== South Africa ===
- Mothar Kante Kabu – Dragon

=== Togo ===
- Fabinho (*) – Aguila, San Salvador F.C., Isidro Metapan

== Asia – Asian Football Confederation ==
=== Japan ===
- Sergio Escudero – Atlético Marte
- Kou Gotou – Inter FA

== South America – CONMEBOL ==
=== Argentina ===
- Lucas Abraham – FAS, Juventud Independiente, San Salvador F.C.
- Luis Acuña - Aguila, Jocoro, Fuerte San Francisco
- Agustín Adorni – Alianza, Pasaquina, Atletico Marte
- Germán Aguila - Jocoro, FAS, Cacahuatique, Fuerte San Francisco
- Pedro Aguirrez – FAS
- Mateo Ahmed – FAS
- Juan Aimar – FAS, Santa Tecla F.C., Platense
- Diego Rafael Álvarez – Firpo, Isidro Metapan, Chalatenango
- Gabriel Alvarez – San Luis Talpa
- Martín Álvarez - Chalatenango
- Sergio Leonel Álvarez – Limeno
- Héctor Amarilla – Aguila
- **Federico Andrada** – Aguila
- Marcelo Argüello – Firpo
- Santiago Autino – FAS
- **Santiago Ayala** – Aguila
- **José Barreto** - Alianza
- Patricio Barroche – Firpo, C.D. Vista Hermosa, Aguila
- Andrés Bazzano – A.D. Isidro Metapán
- Cristian Belucci - Fuerte San Francisco
- Álvaro Bely – C.D. Dragón
- Alejandro de la Cruz Bentos – FAS, Nejapa F.C.
- Sebastián Bini – FAS
- Martín Boasso – FAS
- David Boquín - Sonsonate, Once Deportivo
- Fulgencio Deonel Bordón – Aguila
- Rodrigo de Brito – Santa Tecla F.C., Firpo, Limeno
- Leandro Cabral – Pasaquina
- **Juan Franco Cacace** - Aguila
- Brian Calabrese - Aguila
- Bruno Camilletti – Santa Tecla F.C.
- Walter Capozuchi – San Luis Talpa, ADET
- Roberto Carboni – LA Firpo
- Esteban Omar Cárdenas – Isidro Metapan
- Pedro Cardozo – Aguila
- Ramiro Cepeda – San Luis Talpa
- Roberto Armando Chanampe – Chalatenango, Nejapa
- Omar Axel Clazon – Aguila
- Adrián Colazo – Aguila
- **Javier Colli** – Isidro Metapan
- Matías Coloca – FAS
- Ignacio Colombo – Santa Tecla F.C.
- Luis Darío Calvo - San Salvador F.C.
- Jorge Córdoba – Alianza
- Matías Córdoba – Alianza
- Julián Di Cosmo – FAS
- Mario Costas – Firpo
- Alejandro Cuneo – Firpo
- Santiago Davio – UES
- Alberto Diz – Once Municipal
- Jorge Drovandi – Alianza
- Carlos Daniel Escalante – Juventud Independiente, Once Municipal, Independiente, Limeno, FAS, Aguila, San Salvador F.C.
- **Israel Escalante** - Municipal Limeño
- Eduardo Escobar – Alianza
- Carlos Escudero jnr – Santa Tecla F.C.
- Nicolás Femia - Aguila
- Matías Fernández – Firpo
- Alejandro Frezzotti – Santa Tecla F.C.
- Gustavo Fuentes – Alianza
- Juan Ignacio Fuliana – Isidro Metapan
- Alejandro Gagliardi – Santa Tecla F.C.
- Cecilio Galeano – Alianza
- Patricio Gallardo – Once Municipal
- Fernando Gallo – Sonsonate
- Jorge Leonardo Garay – Dragon
- Gabriel Eduardo Giacopetti - Platense
- Ariel Giles – FAS
- Martín Giménez – Santa Tecla F.C.
- Carlos Alberto Del Giorno – C.D. Pasaquina, C.D. Municipal Limeño, Jocoro F.C.
- Carlos Alberto Gómez – A.D. Isidro Metapán
- Wilson Gómez – FAS
- Alan Leonel González - Chalatenango
- Ariel Leonel González – Alianza F.C.
- Diego González – UES
- **Hernán González** - Cacahuatique
- Marcelo Gonzales – Aguila
- **Mauro González** – LA Firpo
- Juan Carlos Graf – LA Firpo
- Gonzalo Gravano – Alianza F.C.
- Fernando Gutierrez - Limeno
- **Federico Haberkorn'** – Isidro Metapan
- Leonardo Incoruala – Isidro Metapan
- Marcos Ielpo – Aguila (1999)
- Sergio Ibarra – Aguila
- Gabriel Kinjo – Municipal Limeno (2003)
- Francisco Ladogano – UES
- Rodrigo Lagos – San Salvador F.C., A.D. Isidro Metapán
- Bryan Lanzeni – C.D. Dragón
- Agustín Lastagaray – FAS
- Fernando Leguizamon – Firpo
- Pablo Leguizamo – Atletico Marte
- Jonathan Lezcano – FAS
- Manuel Lucero – C.D. Pasaquina
- Gabriel Lučić – Aguila
- Horacio Lugo – Alianza F.C.
- Damián Óscar Luna – Aguila
- Adrián Mahía – Aguila
- Juan Ignaio Mare - Once Deportivo
- Facundo Martínez – FAS
- Maximiliano Martinez - C.D. Chalatenango
- Nicolas Martinez - Aguila
- Leandro Martin - Isidro Metapan
- Gonzalo Mazzia – Atletico Marte, FAS
- Gustavo Mhamed – Limeno
- Matías Milozzi- Once Municipal
- **Juan Cruz Monteagudo** – Alianza F.C.
- Allan Muraldo – C.D. Dragón, LA Firpo, C.D. FAS
- Luca Orozco – Isidro Metapan
- Diego Oyarbide – Isidro Metapan
- Diego Passarelli – Alianza F.C.
- Leonardo Pekarnik – Firpo
- Ruben Dario Perez – Santa Tecla F.C.
- Joel Perucci – Firpo
- Guillermo Pfund – Firpo
- Jonathan Philippe – Alianza
- Cristian Sánchez Prette – Aguila, Audaz
- Andrés Puig – Atletico Marte
- Luciano Quinteros – Arcense
- Gonzalo Ramirez - Aguila, Dragon
- Alexi Ramos – Isidro Metapan
- Lucas Rivero - UES
- Ramiro Rocca - Chalatenango, Alianza
- Lucas Rocco – Santa Tecla F.C.
- Eloy Rodríguez – Santa Tecla F.C.
- Mariano Rodríguez – Dragon
- Maximiliano Morales Roldán – Firpo
- Diego De Rosa – Alianza
- Sebastian Rudman – Firpo
- Daniel Rui – Atletico Marte
- Jeremías Ruíz - Limeno
- Víctor Hugo Sánchez – Atletico Balboa, Arcense
- Luciano Sanhueza - Independiente
- Dante Segovia – Limeno
- Kevin Telmo Smaldone – Dragon
- Blas Sosa - Aguila
- Martín Claudio Sosa – Alianza F.C.
- Facundo Simioli – Santa Tecla F.C., C.D. FAS
- Matias Steib – Alianza F.C.
- **Guillermo Stradella** – FAS, A.D. Isidro Metapán, Inter FA
- Luciano Suárez – A.D. Isidro Metapán
- Gonzalo Tarifa – Santa Tecla F.C.
- Lautaro Toledo - Inter FA
- Adrian Toloza – Santa Tecla F.C.
- Franco Toloza – C.D. Aguila
- Pablo Troyano – Once Municipal
- **Elías Umeres** - Cacahuatique
- Martín Uranga – Arcense
- Juan La Vaca – Arcense
- Gustavo Vecchiarelli – A.D. Isidro Metapán
- Carlos Verdugo – C.D. Aguila
- Guillermo Vernetti – A.D. Isidro Metapán
- Lucas Vico – FAS
- Alejandro Villani - C.D. Chalatenango
- Maximiliano Alexis Villega – J. Independiente
- Mariano Villegas – C.D. Aguila
- José Vizcarra – C.D. Aguila
- Cristian Javier Zamudio – A.D. Isidro Metapán
- Juan Zandoná – Alianza F.C.

=== Brazil ===
- Alan Abdalá – C.D. Sonsonate
- Juliano de Andrade – Alianza F.C., C.D. Luis Ángel Firpo
- José Rogeiro Antunes – LA Firpo
- Carlos Regis Araujo – Once Municipal
- Alyson Batista – C.D. Águila, Juventud Independiente
- Anderson Passos Batista – A.D. Isidro Metapán, Once Lobos
- Alemán Bor-man – C.D. FAS
- Weslley Braz De Almeida – Atletico Marte
- José Caicedo – C.D. Dragón
- Mauro Caju – C.D. Luis Ángel Firpo
- Ronaille Calheira – C.D. Águila
- Moisés Canalonga – C.D. Dragón
- Alex Carioca – Alianza F.C.
- Augusto Do Carmo – C.D. Sonsonate, UES
- Juliano De Carvalho – Atlético Marte
- Ricardo Correia – C.D. FAS
- Luís Rómulo de Castro – C.D. Águila
- Junio Pinto – A.D. Isidro Metapán
- Heslley Couto – C.D. Águila
- Daniel Cruz – Once Municipal
- Pablo Damasco – C.D Santiagueño
- Marcelo Domínguez – Chalatenango
- Dimas – Once Municipal
- Wanderson Silveiro Echeverría – Santa Tecla F.C.
- Eber – Firpo
- Magno Costa Fernandes - Platense
- Alesson Ferreira - Cacahuatique
- Leonardo Ferreira - Isidro Metapan
- Osvaldo Dasilva Filho – Santa Tecla F.C.
- Leandro Lourenço Franco – Aguila, Firpo
- Elenilson Ferreira Garcia - Sonsonate
- Evandro Guimaraes – Dragon
- Paulo Henrique - Isidro Metapan
- Itacaré - UES
- Glaucio lira – Aguila
- Jackson – Dragon, Sonsonate, Pasaquina
- Elcarlos Junior – FAS
- Luiz Carlos Caetano Júnior – Aguila
- Bruno Kairon – Aguila
- Allan Kardeck – Isidro Metapan
- Alexandre Pinto Larangueira – Aguila
- José Laurindo – Firpo
- Caio Laursen – FAS
- Paulo César Rodrigues Lima – FAS, San Salvador F.C., Limeno, Juventud Independiente, Firpo
- Ricardo de Lima – Aguila
- Emerson Reis Luiz – FAS
- Alex Norival Machado – Atlético Marte
- Dionatan Machado - Aguila
- **Yan Maciel** – Aguila, FAS
- Lucas Marcal – Aguila, Once Municipal
- Marcelo Marquez – Municipal Limeno
- Alexandro Martin – Alianza
- Rodinei Martins – Aguila
- Ricardo Mamboré – Firpo
- Lucas Matheus – LA Firpo
- Jose Eduardo Mendez – Chalatenango, Vista Hermosa
- Josielson Moraes – Dragon
- Josimar Moreira – C.D. FAS, C.D. Sonsonate
- Marlon Da Silva de Moura – C.D. Águila
- Gabriel Negueba - Fuerte San Francisco
- Gustavo Mendes Nunez – Alianza F.C., A.D. Isidro Metapán
- Mauro Nunez – C.D. Águila
- Agnaldo Oliveira – Alianza F.C.
- Alessandro De Oliveira – Once Municipal
- Danilo Oliveira – Once Municipal
- Marco De Oliveira – C.D. Dragón
- Paulo De Oliveira – C.D. Chalatenango
- Roberto Oliveira – Atlético Balboa
- Zé Paulo - C.D. Sonsonate, A.D. Isidro Metapán, C.D. Municipal Limeno
- Elvis Pererira – Atlético Balboa
- Luis Sergio Pereira – Atlético Balboa, Dragon
- Marco Antonio Pereira – Dragon
- Severino Piñeiro – Aguila
- Daniel Alexander Prediguer – Aguila, Atletico Balboa
- Roberto Ramos – Limeno
- Ricardinho – Santa Tecla F.C., Isidro Metapán, Atletico Narte
- Alessandro Rodríguez – Isidro Metapán, Atletico Balboa
- Joao Do Rosario – Isidro Metapán
- Márcio Sampaio - Aguila
- Jonathan Santana – Firpo, Zacatecoluca
- **Vinicius Santana** - Fuerte San Francisco
- Mauricio Do Santos – Firpo
- Cleber Lucas dos Santos – Dragon
- Lucas Dos Santos – Isidro Metapan, Limeno
- Noé Dos Santos – Isidro Metapan
- Tiago dos Santos Roberto – Aguila
- Toninho Dos Santos - Aguila
- Anderson da Silva – Aguila
- Ever Da Silva – Firpo
- Fabricio Da Silva – Juventud Independiente
- Glauber Rodrigues da Silva – FAS
- Glauber da Silva – Atlético Marte, Aguila, Once Municipal, Pasaquina
- Guilherme Silva – LA Firpo
- Jorge Da Silva – Juventud Independiente
- Klayton da Silva – UES
- Leonardo Da Silva – C.D. Vista Hermosa, Alianza F.C., A.D. Isidro Metapán
- Mateus Da Silva – LA Firpo, Platense
- Pio Da Silva – LA Firpo
- Reynaldo Da Silva – UES
- Roberto da Silva – Dragon
- Raphael Alves da Silva – UES
- Thiago Monteiro Accioli Da Silva – LA Firpo
- Wesley Tanque Da Silva – LA Firpo
- Wilker da Silva - Cacahuatique, Fuerte San Francisco
- Marco Soarez – FAS
- Benvenutti de Souza - Isidro Metapan
- Ducivan De Sousa – Dragon
- José Oliveira de Souza – Aguila, Limeno, Alianza, Firpo
- Alves Dos Santos(Sassá) - Sonsonate
- **Gustavo Souza** - Firpo, Alianza
- Willer Souza – Alianza
- Sandro Machado Tavares – Aguila
- Marcio Teruel – FAS
- Jimmy Vargas (Djimi Vargas) – Aguila
- André Luiz Vasconcelos - Firpo
- Gabriel Ventura - Firpo
- Lucas Ventura – Aguila, Zacatecoluca
- Flavio Viana – UES
- Andre Luiz Vieira – Aguila
- Valtinho – Juventud Independiente
- Felipe Ximenez – FAS
- Sandro Luís Zamboni – Alianza

=== Chile ===
- Ramón Ávila – Firpo
- Felipe Brito – Firpo
- Luis Cabezas - Chalatenango
- **Cesar Diaz** - FAS
- Sebastián Julio – Firpo, Alianza, Municipal Limeno, Águila
- Álvaro López - FAS
- Juan Carlos Madrid – Alianza
- Juan Márquez - Acajutla
- Jhon Novoa – Alianza
- Juan José Ossandón – Alianza
- Moisés Rivera - Santa Clara
- Raúl Toro – Firpo, Alianza, Atlético Marte
- Carlos Verdugo – Águila

=== Colombia ===
- Mario Alberto Abadía – FAS, Juventud Independiente
- Jerson Steven Aguilar - Audaz
- Argenis Alba - Atletico Marte, Platense
- Alonso Alcibar – Isidro Metapan
- Yohan Ambuila – Pasaquina
- Carlos Fernando Angulo - Chalatenango
- Andres Angulo - Metapan
- Luis Angulo - Dragon, Fuerte San Francisco
- Mario Sergio Angulo – Dragon
- Gabriel Antero – Aguila
- Robinson Aponzá - Limeno
- Luis Arboleda - Chalatenango
- Victor Arboleda - Alianza
- Yair Arboleda - Municipal Limeno, Dragon, FAS, Platense
- Eder Arias – C.D. Águila, Firpo, Chalatenango
- Franco Arizala - Alianza F.C.
- **Wilber Arizala** - Platense, Firpo
- Carlos Asprilla * – Atlético Balboa
- Luis Carlos Asprilla – Atlético Balboa, Once Municipal, San Salvador F.C., Isidro Metapan, Limeno
- Nestor Asprilla – Atletico Marte
- Leyvin Balanta - Limeno
- Victor Balanta – Atlético Balboa
- Yoan Ballesteros – Atletico Marte
- Julian Barragan – San Salvador F.C.
- **Nayan Andrés Bello** - Platense, Alianza
- Ronald Benavides - Once Deportivo
- Mario Benítez – LA Firpo
- Mahecha Bermúdez – C.D. Luis Ángel Firpo
- Oswaldo Blanco - Alianza F.C.
- **Carlos Bogotá** - Platense
- Daniel Buitrago - C.D. Sonsonate
- Faider Fabio Burbano – C.D. Aguila
- Fránklin Cabezas – Alianza F.C.
- James Cabezas – C.D. Águila, C.D. Municipal Limeño
- Gustavo Cabrera – Firpo, San Salvador F.C.
- Gersain Caicedo - Audaz, A.D. Isidro Metapán
- Heiner Caicedo – Firpo
- **Jhon Caicedo** - INCA-Aruba
- José Fabio Caicedo – Dragon
- Ronaldinho Caicedo - Platense, Aguila
- Samuel Campaña – Dragon
- Ederson Buendía Canoles – Firpo
- Libardo Carvajal – C.D. Arcense, Chalatenango, Once Lobos, Once Municipal
- Oscar Castellanos - Zacatecoluca
- Henry Castillo - Firpo
- Jhon Castillo – Dragon, Vista Hermosa, Alianza, UES
- Carlos Ceballos – UES
- Luis José Pérez Charriz – Juventud Independiente
- Juan Pablo Chacon – LA Firpo, Once Municipal, San Salvador F.C.
- Manuel Chala - Dragon
- Jhony Moran Chan – Atletico Marte, Chalatenango
- Edilson Chávez – Arcense
- Devier Chaverra - FAS
- Jeferson Collazos - FAS
- Harold Contreras – Dragon
- Beitar Córdoba - Sonsonate, Limeno
- Rodolfo Córdoba – FAS
- José Erick Correa - Limeno
- Giribeth Cotes – Aguila
- Julián Cruz – Atlético Balboa
- Luis Cuesta Col – Atletico Marte
- **Stiven Dávila** – Aguila
- Juan Camilio Delgado - Platense, Alianza, Jocoro, Once Deportivo, Fuerte San Francisco
- Bladimir Díaz – Chalatenango, Alianza, FAS
- Briand Andrés Díaz - Platense
- Alexis Fernando Díaz – Juventud Independiente
- Juan David Díaz- Juventud Independiente
- Peter Dominguez – Chalatenango
- Eliécer Espinosa - Limeno
- Walter Escobar * – FAS
- Yílmar Filigrana – FAS
- Yuberney Franco – Dragon
- Marcó Tulio Gallego - Once Deportivo
- John Gamboa – C.D. Dragon
- Orlando Garces – San Salvador F.C.
- Felix Garcia – Juventud Independiente
- John Jairo García – C.D. Chalatenango
- Martin Garcia – Alianza F.C., Atletico Marte
- Norman García – Luis Angel Firpo
- Iván Garrido – Alianza F.C.
- Bryan Gil - C.D. FAS
- Christian Gil – C.D. Chalatenango
- Andrés Giraldo – Juventud Independiente
- Camilo Gómez - Independiente
- Christian Gonzales – C.D. FAS
- Cristian Adolfo González – UES, Juventud Independiente
- Fredy Gonzales – C.D. Sonsonate
- **Manuel Esteban González** - Platense
- Nito Gonzales – C.D. Arcense, Atletico Balboa, C.D. Municipal Limeno, Once Lobos
- Tardelis Peña González - Audaz, Independiente, Firpo, Atletico Marte
- **Julián Grueso** - Cacahuatique, Alianza F.C., Inter FA
- Oscar Guerrero – Alianza F.C.
- William Guerrero – Sonsonate, UES
- Yerson Gutiérrez - Isidro Metapan
- Wílmar Hernández – Chalatenango
- Carlos Daniel Hidalgo – Sonsonate
- Diomer Hinestroza - El Vencedor, Cacahuatique
- Jhoaho Hinestroza - Isidro Metapan
- Luis Hinestroza – Santa Tecla F.C., Alianza, Cacahuatique
- Yair Ibargüen – Aguila
- **Yehider Ibargüen** – Aguila
- Jairo Hurtado Izquierda – Once Municipal, FAS
- Bernardo Jaramillo – San Salvador F.C.
- Victor Jaramillo – Once Municipal, Chalatenango
- **Victor Landazuri** - Platense, Alianza, Santa Tecla F.C., Once Deportivo, Atletico Balboa
- Jorge Lara - Cacahuatique
- Juan Diego Lasso - Limeno
- Miller Lazarazo – Atletico Marte
- Héctor Lemus – Dragon
- David Livingston – Metapan
- Dilan Esteban Lloreda - Pasaquina
- Eisner Loboa - Limeno
- Dorian López – Atletico Balboa
- James López – Aguila
- Mike López – Metapan
- Alexander Lugo – Chalatenango
- Victor Hugo Malfa – FAS, Chalatenango, San Salvador F.C.
- Camilo Mancilla – Alianza
- John Marulanda – Alianza
- Andres Medina – San Salvador F.C., Nejapa, Once Municipal, Atlético Balboa, Once Municipal
- Juan Camilo Mejía – Chalatenango, Vista Hermosa, Once Municipal, Aguila
- Stiver Mena – Alianza
- Félix Micolta – FAS
- Yessy Mina - Santa Tecla F.C.
- Mauricio Mendoza – FAS, Chalatenango
- Gabriel Menjumea – Alianza
- Gerson Mier – C.D. Arcense, Limeno (2003)
- Oscar Movil – C.D. Sonsonate, C.D. Municipal Limeno
- Miguel Potes Mina – Once Municipal
- John Machado – C.D. Dragon, El Vencedor, Isidro Metapan, Jocoro F.C., Platense, Atletico Marte
- Luis Marines – C.D. Dragon
- **Edgar Medrano** - Once Deportivo, Aguila, FAS
- José Miguel Medrano - Dragon
- Daley Mena - Audaz, Alianza, Sonsonate, Once Deportivo
- Neymer Miranda – Pasaquina, Once Deportivo, El Vencedor
- Hermes Martínez Misal -C.D. Chalatenango, C.D. Águila, San Salvador F.C., C.D. Luis Ángel Firpo, Alianza F.C.
- Andrés Molina – C.D. Dragon
- Jose Mondragon - C.D. Sonsonate
- Harrison Mojica - FAS
- Jairo Molina - FAS
- Edgar Montaño – Santa Clara, Alianza F.C.
- Jhon Montaño - Dragon
- Victor Hugo Montaño – FAS
- André Morales - Firpo,
- Kevin Moreno - Dragon
- Oscar Morera – Aguila
- Arbey Mosquera - Metapan
- Carlos Mosquera – Alianza
- Eider Mosquera – Independiente Nacional 1906
- Elkin Mosquera - C.D. Chalatenango
- Juan Mosquera - Metapan
- Juan Carlos Mosquera – C.D. Dragon, Atletico Balboa, Alianza F.C.
- Cristian Ali Gil Mosquera – C.D. Atlético Balboa, C.D. Vista Hermosa, San Salvador F.C., C.D. Municipal Limeño, Atletico Marte, UES
- Álvaro Mota – San Salvador F.C.
- Manuel Murrillo - Municipal Limeno, Dragon
- Miguel Murillo – Alianza
- **Miguel Angel Murillo** - Once Deportivo, FAS
- Yeison Murillo – Alianza F.C., Metapan
- Jair Muñoz – Alianza
- Mario Muñoz – Alianza
- Guillermo Nieves - Inter FA
- Alexander Obregón – San Salvador F.C., C.D. Chalatenango, C.D. FAS, C.D. Luis Angel Firpo, Independiente Nacional 1906
- Brayan Obregon - Santa Tecla F.C.
- Libardo Carbajal Orobio – Once Municipal
- Marcelo Rojas Ospina – Atletico Marte
- Juan Pablo Otálvaro - Aguila
- William Palacio - Municipal Limeno
- **Brayam Manuel Palacios** - Platense
- Hugo Palacios – Alianza
- Jackson Palacios - Jocoro F.C.
- Kelvin Palacios – Juventud Independiente
- Luis Palacios - C.D. Pasaquina
- Maikon Palacios – Firpo
- Wilson Palacios – C.D. Chalatenango
- Yohalin Palacios – C.D. Chalatenango, Jocoro F.C., Dragon
- Carlos Parra – Atletico Marte
- **Gilberth Parra** - Atletico Balboa
- **William Parra** - Alianza
- Yerson Paz – San Salvador F.C.
- Roberto Carlos Peña – C.D. FAS
- Tardelius Pena - Firpo, Atletico Marte
- Raúl Peñaranda – Alianza, C.D. FAS, Firpo, Platense
- Luis Arturo Peralta - C.D. FAS, Atletico Marte, Isidro Metapan, Platense
- Luis Alberto Perea - C.D. FAS
- Nilson Pérez – Firpo
- Cristian Pinzón- C.D. Dragon
- Diego Pizarro – Alianza
- Boris Yasser Polo - El Vencedor
- John Edward Polo – C.D. Arcense, Atletico Balboa
- Alonso Umaña Popo - C.D. Audaz, Firpo, Once Deportivo
- Pablo Quandt – FAS
- Andrés Quejada – Aguila, Atletico Marte, Santa Tecla
- Teobaldo Quezada – FAS
- Jeison Quiñones - C.D. Pasaquina, C.D. FAS, Once Deportivo
- Yosimar Quiñónez - Santa Tecla F.C., Municipal Limeno
- José Ramírez – Aguila
- Edgar Ramos * – Alianza
- Jose Luis Ramos – Isidro Metapan
- Jorge Ramos - FAS
- Carlos Rendón – FAS
- Franklin Rengifo – Firpo
- Andres Murillo Rentería - Fuerte San Francisco
- Hector Renteria - Chalatenango
- **Jean Aldair Rentería** - Atletico Balboa
- Marcelino Renterí – Alianza
- Nixon Restrepo – Juventud Independiente
- Duvier Riascos – Alianza, Aguila
- Jhonny Riascos – Dragon
- Steven Riascos - Firpo
- Jhony Rios – Dragon, Aguila, Firpo, Municipal Limeno, Isidro Metapan
- Francisco Rivera – San Salvador F.C.
- Ruben Dario Robledo – Chalatenango
- Eduardo Steven Rodríguez - Audaz, Chalatenango, Independiente, Atletico Marte, Santa Tecla F.C.
- Luis Angel Rodriguez - Platense, Aguila
- Luis Torres Rodríguez – C.D. Vista Hermosa, Atlético Balboa, Firpo, San Salvador F.C.
- Santiago Rodríguez – Atletico Balboa
- Julio Romana – C.D. Aguila
- **Ronaldo Royer** - Atletico Balboa
- **Carlos Salazar** - Chalatenango, Isidro Metapan, Aguila, Alianza, Fuerte San francisco
- Juan Camilo Salazar – FAS
- Wilber Sanchez – San Salvador F.C.
- Wilson Sanchez – Isidro Metapan, Atlético Marte, C.D. Vista Hermosa
- Jorge Sandoval – Alianza, C.D. Municipal Limeño, C.D. Chalatenango, San Salvador F.C.
- John Carlos Serna – Alianza
- Francisco Serrano – Aguila
- Henry Sevillano – Firpo, Chalatenango
- Jaime Sierra - Aguila
- Jeffersson Sierra - Santa Tecla F.C.
- Santiago Rodríguez Silva – Atlético Balboa
- Julian Silvestre - Platense
- Miguel Solís – Independiente, Once Municipal, UES, Chalatenango
- Herlbert Enrique Soto – Alianza
- Jonathan Tapias - Inter FA
- Edier Tello - Firpo
- **Yerson Tobar** – Alianza, Dragon, Atletico Balboa
- Max Torres – C.D. Luis Ángel Firpo
- Yhoner Toro – Alianza
- Pablo Vacca – Firpo
- Carlos Urrego – Dragon
- **Jhonatan Urrutia** - Once Deportivo, Platense, Isidro Metapan, INCA-Aruba
- **Jose Valencia** – Firpo
- Luis Fernando Valencia – Dragon
- Jimmy Valoyes – C.D. Dragon, C.D. Aguila
- Juan Jose Vasquez - Once Deportivo
- Juan Guillermo Vélez - Firpo
- Francisco Villalba – San Salvador F.C.
- Carlos Villarreal – C.D. Municipal Limeño
- Hugo Viveros – C.D. Municipal Limeño
- Jefferson Viveros – C.D. FAS, Juventud Independiente, C.D. Municipal Limeño, C.D. Dragon, A.D. Isidro Metapán
- Fernando Zuleta – C.D. Aguila
- Danny Zúñiga - Zacatecoluca
- Wbeimar Zuniga - Isidro Metapan

=== Ecuador ===
- Javier Angulo – Once Municipal
- Joe Arboleda - Chalatenango
- Tomás Arboleda – Dragon
- Eber Caicedo - Firpo, Platense
- Carlos Castañeda – Dragon
- **Dany Cetre** - Chalatenango, Isidro Metapan, Fuerte San Francisco, Cacahuatique
- Moisés Cuero – Once Municipal
- André Hurtado - Chalatenango
- Fausto Klinger – Municipal Limeno
- Richard Mercado - Aguila
- Eder Moscoso - FAS, Jocoro, Chalatenango
- Joao Plata (*) - FAS
- Michael Robinzon - Platense
- **Yosimar Rodríguez** - Fuerte San Francisco
- Henry Rua - Isidro Metapan
- Fabio Zuniga – Dragon

=== Paraguay ===
- David Leonardo Alcaraz - Sonsonate
- Oliver Almirón - Firpo
- Edgar Osvaldo Alvarez – Dragon
- Diego Areco - Jocoro F.C., FAS
- Jose Antonio Ayala - Jocoro
- Néstor Ayala (*) – FAS, Once Lobos, Atlético Balboa
- Andres Insfran Britez - Pasaquina, Municipal Limeno
- Juan Pablo Caballero – Municipal Limeno
- Mauro Caballero - Aguila
- Roque Caballero - Jocoro
- Jose Cabanas – Isidro Metapan, Zacatecoluca
- Jorge Cáceres - Municipal Limeno, Jocoro
- Julián Chávez Ruíz - Pasaquina
- Arnulfo Coleman - Pasaquina
- Julio Cesar Coleman – FAS
- Miguel Angel Dominguez – Alianza
- Oswaldo Nelson Duarte – Isidro Metapan
- Arnaldo Ferreira – Municipal Limeno
- Marcelo Ferreira - LA Firpo
- Edgar Fleitas/Fleytas – Dragon
- Oscar Franco - Jocoro
- Lorenzo Rodrigo Frutos - Santa Tecla F.C.
- Gabriel Garcete – Isidro Metapan, Limeno, FAS, Chalatenangi, Atletico Balboa
- Carlos Alberto Gonzalez - Fuerte San Francisco
- Marco Luis González - Chalatenango
- Nicolas Gonzalez - Fuerte San Francisco, Municipal Limeno
- Gustavo Guerreño - C.D. Pasaquina, Alianza F.C., Santa Tecla F.C.
- Didilfo Guerrero – Municipal Limeno
- Luis Ibarra - Atletico Marte, Zacatecoluca
- Hugo Alexis Oviedo Jara - Municipal Limeno
- Samuel Jiménez - Municipal Limeno, Fuerte San Francisco
- Javier Lezcano - C.D. Pasaquina, C.D. Águila, Platense, Municipal Limeno
- Luis Carlos Maldonado – Dragon
- Sandro Melgarejo - C.D. Municipal Limeño, Atletico Marte, Platense, Zacatecoluca
- Osvaldo Mendoza – FAS, A.D. Isidro Metapán
- **Mario Narváez** - INCA-Aruba
- Jorge Esteban Ortíz – Isidro Metapan
- Jeremías Pereira - Municipal Limeno
- Tobias Quintana - Dragon
- Edgar Añazco Riquelme – Aguila
- Jose Luis Rodriguez - Jocoro, FAS
- Juan Ángel Sosa – Atlético Marte
- Jeyson Joel Vega – FAS

=== Peru ===
- Jahir Camero – Municipal Limeno, Dragon, Atletico Balboa
- Germán Carty (*) – Chalatenango
- Aldo Cavero – Municipal Limeno
- Cesar Augusto Charum – Chalatenango, Municipal Limeno
- Paul Cominges (*) – Aguila
- Miguel Curiel - Aguila
- Diego Espinoza - Inter FA
- Antonio Serrano Davila – FAS
- Frank Palomino – LA Firpo
- Pedro Prado – FAS

=== Uruguay ===
- Manuel "Manolo" Abreu – C.D. Luis Ángel Firpo
- Sebastián Abreu (*) - Santa Tecla F.C.
- Waldemar Acosta - Aguila
- Mauro Aldave – Atletico Marte
- Luis Edgardo Almada Alves – C.D. Águila
- Víctor Avelenda – Municipal Limeno
- Fernando Fajardo Balzani – San Salvador F.C.
- Alcides Eduardo Bandera – A.D. Isidro Metapán, C.D. Atlético Balboa, Atlético Marte
- José Miguel Barreto - Once Deportivo, Santa Tecla
- Diego Benítez – Alianza F.C.
- **Matías Bentín** - Municipal Limeno
- Andrés Berrueta – San Salvador F.C.
- Juan Dario Bicca – Isidro Metapan
- Carlos Bueno (*) - Santa Tecla F.C.
- Santiago Carrera – C.D. FAS
- Gastón Colman - Santa Tecla F.C.
- Gonzalo Camili – Aguila (1999)
- Nicolás Céspedes - Atletico Marte
- José Denis Conde – Alianza
- Martin Correra - FAS
- Matías Cresseri – Aguila
- Rodrigo Cubilla - Chalatenango
- Alejandro Cuneo – Firpo
- Alejandro Curbelo (*) – Alianza
- Paolo Martin Dantaz - Municipal Limeno
- Luis Fernando Espíndola – Alianza, San Salvador F.C., Nejapa, Once Municipal
- Nicolás Fagúndez – Aguila, Sonsonate, Isidro Metapan
- Raúl Eduardo Falero – Alianza, Municipal Limeno, San Salvador F.C.
- Darío Ferreira – Alianza
- Bruno Ferri – Dragon
- Ignacio Flores – Aguila
- Ariel Fontela – Alianza
- Maximiliano Freitas – Alianza
- Jorge Leonardo Garay – Dragon (2001), Aguila, Atlético Balboa
- Víctor Rafael García – Alianza, Aguila
- **Nicolás Gómez** - Isidro Metapan
- Mathias Goyeni – FAS
- Sebastián Gutiérrez - Atletico Marte
- Washington Hernández – Firpo
- Alejandro Larrea – Alianza
- Darío Larrosa – Firpo, Aguila
- Jose Mauro Laurindo – Firpo
- Andres Martin Lima - Sonsonate
- Gonzalo da Luz - Aguila
- **Gustavo Machado** - Isidro Metapan
- Cristhian Maciel - Jocoro
- Paulo Medina – Aguila
- Martin Mederos – Firpo, UES
- Álvaro Méndez – Limeno
- **Matías Mier** - Zacatecoluca, Alianza
- Martín Morales – FAS
- Cristian Olivera – Alianza, Santa Tecla F.C.
- Claudio Pasadi – Once Lobos
- Carlos Daniel Pimienta – C.D. Águila
- Jorge Puglia – Alianza F.C.
- Liber Quiñones - Santa Tecla F.C.
- Pablo Enrique Quiñonez – C.D. FAS, Atlético Balboa, Once Lobos
- Jorge Ramírez – A.D. Isidro Metapán, C.D. Sonsonate
- Juan Carlos Reyes – A.D. Isidro Metapán, C.D. Luis Ángel Firpo, Once Municipal, Nejapa F.C., Ateltico Balboa, Juventud Independiente
- **Ányelo Rodríguez**– Alianza, Municipal Limeno
- Flavio Scarone – Aguila
- Diego Seoane – Aguila
- Matías Soto - Santa Tecla F.C.
- Alvaro Crucci Silva – Aguila
- Claudio Ramón Pasadi Silva – FAS, Isidro Metapan
- Santiago Risso – Juventud Independiente
- Fabricio Silva – Alianza F.C., Santa Tecla F.C.
- Yari David Silvera – Alianza
- Alejandro Soler – FAS
- Anthony Sosa – Alianza
- Sergio Souza - Santa Tecla F.C.
- Paolo Suárez – FAS, Isidro Metapan
- Leonardo Sum – Limeno
- Marcos Adrian Sum – Limeno
- Martín Tejeda – Firpo
- Pablo Tiscornia – Firpo
- Jesús Toscanini – Juventud Independiente, Alianza, Limeno
- Oscar Vallejo – Alianza F.C., San Salvador F.C.
- Christian Vaquero – Alianza, Santa Tecla F.C., Dragon, Chalatenango
- José Pablo “Rulo” Varela – Alianza
- Walter Vázquez – Alianza
- Joaquín Verges - Aguila, Atletico Marte
- Diego Sebastián Viera – Alianza
- Emiliano Villar - FAS, Isidro Metapan
- Carlos Edgar Villarreal – Dragon, FAS, Alianza, Atlético Balboa, Limeno
- Christian Yeladian – Alianza

=== Venezuela ===
- Daniel de Oliveira (*) – Firpo
- Luis Artubes Iseles – Dragon
- Pierre Alexandre Pluchino Galuppo – Firpo
- César Iván González – Firpo
- Rafael Ponzo (*) – UES

== North & Central America, Caribbean – CONCACAF ==
=== Belize ===
- Krisean Lopez (*) - Platense

=== Canada ===
- Adam Bisgaard - A.D. Chalatenango

=== Costa Rica ===
- Jeremy Araya – Juventud Independiente
- Yosimar Arias (*) - Sonsonate
- Evance Benwell – San Salvador F.C.
- Enar Bolaños – Alacranes Del Norte
- Bernard Mullins Campbell (*) – FAS
- Johan Condega - Sonsonate
- Sergio Cordoba – Chalatenango
- Erick Corrales – Nejapa F.C.
- Rolando Corella – FAS
- David Diach (*) – Firpo
- Allan Duarte – UES
- José Luis Gónzález – Chalatenango
- Donny Grant Zamora (*) – FAS
- Floyd Guthrie – Firpo
- **Yoserth Hernández** - Inter Santa Tecla
- Kervin Lacey – Limeno
- Johnny Woodly Lambert – Alianza
- Erick Marín – Firpo
- Luis Martínez – Limeno
- Michael Myers – Aguila
- Darryl Parker - Firpo
- David Sandoval Peña – ADET, San Salvador F.C.
- Gustavo Peña – UES
- Carlos Rodríguez – Atlético Balboa, San Salvador F.C.
- Carlos Pancita Rodríguez Marín – Limeno
- Rodolfo Rodríguez (*) – FAS
- Erick Scott (*) – Firpo
- José Alberto Solano – San Luis Talpa
- Alejandro Sequeira (*) – Aguila
- William Vargas – Chalatenango

=== Cuba ===
- Aricheell Hernández (*) - Firpo
- **Marcel Hernández** (*) - Inter Santa Tecla
- Julio Maya – Atlético Marte
- Kevin Martin - Once Deportivo
- Luis Paradela (*) - Jocoro, Chalatenango
- Yaikel Perez (*) – Alianza, Aguila
- Yosel Piedra - Chalatenango

=== Dominican Republic ===
- Pedro Aquino – Atlético Marte
- Jonathan Faña (*) – Alianza
- Óscar Mejía (*) – Atlético Marte, Firpo
- Gabriel Ernesto Núñez (*) – Alianza, Independiente, Atletico Marte
- Luis Sánchez – Atlético Marte
- Francisco Vásquez – Juventud Independiente

=== Guatemala ===
- Julio Ariz – Aguila
- Edward Cocherari (*) – ADET, Alianza, San Salvador F.C.
- Franklin Eduardo García - Sonsonate
- Cristian Noriega (*) – FAS
- Luis Tatuaca (*) - Atletico Marte

=== Haiti ===
- Johnny Descolines (*) – Isidro Metapan

=== Honduras ===
- Éver Alvarado (*) – Limeno
- Ernesto Noel Aquino – Atletico Balboa, Isidro Metapan, Once Municipal
- Aly Arriola – Limeno
- Eduardo Arriola (*) – Dragon, FAS
- Johnny Ávila – Isidro Metapan
- Bonel Ávila – Vista Hermosa
- Marcio Ayala – Dragon
- Roberto Bailey Jnr – C.D. Atlético Balboa
- Libardo Barbajal – Once Municipal
- Arlie Bernardez - Pasaquina
- Alfred Boden – San Luis Talpa
- Camilo Bonilla – Atletico Balboa
- Marvin Orlando Brown – Isidro Metapan
- Orvin Cabrera – Firpo
- Mauricio Rodolfo Castaneda – Once Municipal
- Edenilson Paulino Castillo - Isidro Metapan
- Ramon Alberto Castillo – Atlético Marte
- Jairy Crisanto - Jocoro
- Arnold Cruz (*) – Aguila
- Héctor Amaya Fernández – Dragon (1999)
- Noel Flores – Isidro Metapan
- Gustavo Adolfo Gallegos – Limeno
- Martín Eduardo García – C.D. Juventud Olimpica Metalio
- Marlon Godoy – Isidro Metapan
- Alberto Guity – Dragon
- Carlos Alexander Guity (*) – C.D. Juventud Olimpica Metalio, Limeno
- Elmer Guity - Jocoro F.C.
- Óscar Lagos (*) – Dragon
- Emerson Lalin – Chalatenango, Limeno
- Ovidio Lanza - Jocoro
- Julio César de León (*) – Limeno
- José Luis López – Chalatenango
- Luciano Valerio Harry – Vista Hermosa
- Miguel Mariano – FAS, Limeno
- Henry Josué Martínez – Nejapa
- Walter Martínez (*) – FAS
- German Mejia – Limeno
- Arnold Josue Melendez - Jocoro
- Jorge Martínez Ogalde – Santa Clara
- Christian Mitri – Arcense
- Junior Padilla - Jocoro
- Milton Geovanny Palacios - Audaz
- Mario Pavón – Santa Clara, Arcense
- Fabian Andres Perez – Limeno
- Rafael Fabricio Pérez (*) – Atletico Marte
- Francisco Ramírez (*) – Vista Hermosa
- Luis Alfredo Ramírez (*) – Limeno
- Wilmer Ramos – Once Municipal
- Enrique Reneau (*) – C.D. Atlético Balboa, Chalatenango
- Francis Reyes – Limeno
- Néstor Steve Reyes – Juventud Independiente
- Elison Rivas - Aguila
- Abel Rodríguez (*) – Alianza
- Germán Rodríguez – Limeno (1999), Dragon, San Salvador F.C., C.D. Arcense
- Henry Romero - Jocoro
- Christian Santamaría (*) – Limeno
- Hugo Sarmiento – C.D. Atlético Balboa, San Luis Talpa, ADET, Isidro Metapan, Vista Hermosa, Independiente Nacional 1906
- Elvis Scott (*) – Alianza
- Nissi Sauceda - Jocoro
- Fabio Ulloa (*) – Aguila
- Eugenio Valerio – Limeno, Atletico Balboa
- Pompilio Cacho Valerio (*) – Vista Hermosa, C.D. Luis Ángel Firpo
- Gerson Vásquez – Aguila
- Jorge Guillermo Wagner – Isidro Metapan, Arcense, Aguila
- Franklin Vinosis Webster – Atletico Balboa, Chalatenango, Alacranes del Norte, Vista Hermosa, Atlético Balboa, San Salvador F.C.
- Georgie Welcome (*) – Dragon
- Brayan Zuñiga - Jocoro
- Clayvin Zúñiga – Limeno, FAS

=== Jamaica ===
- Nicholas Addlery (*) – Aguila
- Jermaine Anderson (*) – Aguila
- Kemal Beckford - Chalatenango, Jocoro
- Girvon Ricardo Brown – Isidro Metapan
- Craig Foster - Chalatenango, Once Deportivo, Santa Tecla F.C.
- Sean Fraser (*) – Once Municipal, Alianza, Dragon
- Garrick Gordon – Municipal Limeno, Vista Hermosa, Atlético Marte, UES
- Wolde Harris (*) – FAS
- Kenroy Howell - Dragon, Chalatenango
- Jabari Hylton - Once Deportivo
- Jeremie Lynch (*) – Firpo
- Kemal Malcolm - Chalatenango, Once Deportivo
- Chevone Marsh - Chalatenango
- Colorado Murray (*) - Fuerte San Francisco
- Romeo Ovando Parkes (*) – Isidro Metapan
- Akeem Priestley (*) – Isidro Metapan
- Kamoy Kadeem Simpson - Once Deportivo
- Keithy Simpson (*) - C.D. Águila
- François Swaby – Firpo
- McKauly Tulloch - UES, Sonsonate, Isidro Metapan, Audaz

=== Mexico ===
- Juan de Alba – Municipal Limeno
- Joel Almeida - Santa Tecla, El Vencedor, Firpo, Municipal Limeno
- Jairo Araujo – Alianza
- Armando García Arechiga – Municipal Limeno, Firpo
- Roberto Clemente Avila – Atlético Marte
- Julían Barragán – San Salvador F.C.
- Jahir Barraza - Santa Tecla, Aguila
- Jose Luis Calderon - Once Deportivo
- Diego Castellanos – FAS
- Elio Castro - Santa Tecla
- Kevin Chaurand - Once Deportivo
- Alejandro Dautt - Santa Tecla, Once Deportivo
- Yair Delgadillo – Municipal Limeno, Isidro Metapan
- Carlos Félix - Chalatenango
- Juan Carlos Enríquez – FAS
- Armando García – Municipal Limeno (1999)
- Marco Granados - Once Deportivo
- Daniel Guzman - Atletico Marte
- Pablo Hütt – Once Municipal, Chalatenango
- Luis Ángel Landín – Municipal Limeno
- David López – Isidro Metapan
- Manuel Luna – Chalatenango, UES
- Luis Madrigal - FAS
- Aldo Magaña – Municipal Limeno
- Óscar Maturín – Nejapa
- Luis Ángel Mendoza - FAS
- Andrés Ortega Mora – Atlético Marte
- Adrian Muro - Once Deportivo
- José Luis Osorio Aguilar – Chalatenango, Atlético Marte, Alianza, Nejapa
- Ceveriano García Palominos – Vista Hermosa
- Gullit Peña - FAS
- José Manuel Piñeiro - Pasaquina
- Marvin Piñón - Once Deportivo
- Felipe Ponce Ramírez – Alianza, Municipal Limeno
- José Manuel Rivera - Sonsonate
- Ismael Rodríguez (*) – Aguila
- Ramón Rodríguez – Atlético Marte
- Omar Rosas - Platense
- Jesus Everardo Rubio - Chalatenango
- Hugo Sánchez Portugal - Once Municipal
- Gael Sandoval – Alianza
- Edgar Solis - Once Deportivo
- Ulises Tavares - Sonsonate
- Hilario Tristán- Sonsonate
- German Ramírez Urenda - Isidro Metapan
- Dieter Vargas - Once Deportivo, Chalatenango
- Francisco Javier Vargas- Atlético Marte
- **Juan Vega** - FAS
- Roberto Ventura – Municipal Limeno

=== Nicaragua ===
- Armando Collado (*) – Nejapa, Alianza
- Luis Fernando Copete (*) - Sonsonate, Once Deportivo, Isidro Metapan
- Cyril Errington (*) - UES, Alianza F.C., Firpo
- Pablo Gállego (*) - Platense
- Henry Niño (*) - Chalatenango
- Emilio Palacios (*) – Independiente Nacional 1906
- Wilber Sánchez (*) – San Salvador
- Danny Téllez (*) – Dragon
- Hamilton West (*) - ADET

=== Panama ===
- **Rafael Águila** - Firpo
- Nelson Barahona - Firpo
- Anthony Basile (*) – Once Municipal
- Rolando Blackburn (*) – FAS
- Eduardo Jiménez Blis – Aguila
- **Gabriel Brown** - Inter Santa Tecla
- Roberto Brown (*) – FAS
- **Ángel Caicedo** - Fuerte San Francisco
- Miguel Camargo (*) – Aguila
- Anel Canales (*) – Once Municipal, Alianza, Chalatenango, Isidro Metapan, Firpo
- Jair Catuy - Platense
- Roberto Chen (*) - FAS
- Richard Dixon (*) - Aguila
- **Joshua Gallardo** - Firpo, Fuerte San Francisco
- **Freddy Góndola** - Inter Santa Tecla
- Rogelio Juárez – Santa Tecla
- Abdiel Macea - Sonsonate, Once Deportivo
- **Aldair McKenzie** - INCA-Aruba
- Julio Medina III (*) – Aguila
- Luis Mendoza – Once Municipal, Firpo
- Nicolás Muñoz (*) – Alianza, Aguila, FAS, Vista Hermosa, Chalatenango, Firpo, Pasaquina, El Vencedor, Municipal Limeno
- Temistocles Perez – FAS
- Josimar Gomez Piggott - Sonsonate
- Percival Piggott (*) – Firpo
- Víctor Herrera Piggott (*) – Firpo
- Armando Polo (*) - Sonsonate, Santa Tecla, Firpo
- Francisco Portillo (*) – Alianza, Once Municipal, San Salvador F.C.
- **Alberto Ramirez** - INCA-Aruba
- Ameth Ramírez - Isidro Metapan
- Gabriel Rios – Dragon, UES
- Rolando Rojas – Vista Hermosa
- Orlando Rodríguez (*) – FAS, Alianza
- Publio Rodriguez – Once Municipal
- Joel Solanilla (*) – FAS
- Juan Ramón Solís (*) – Aguila
- Alberto Zapata (*) – Alianza

=== Puerto Rico ===
- Hector Ramos (*) – Isidro Metapan, Aguila, Alianza

=== Saint Kitts and Nevis ===
- Devaughn Elliott (*) – Pasaquina

=== Trinidad and Tobago ===
- Jomoul Francois - Independiente
- Jamal Jack (*) - Dragon, Jocoro
- Ricardo John (*) - Firpo
- Weslie John (*) - UES
- Samuel Kordell – Pasaquina, Chalatenango
- Yohance Marshall (*) – Juventud Independiente
- Leston Paul (*) - Pasaquina
- Willis Plaza (*) - Alianza
- James Dwane Ronaldo (*) - Pasaquina
- Vladimir Henderson Suite – Atlético Marte
- **Jomal Williams** (*) - Isidro Metapan, Firpo, Aguila, Once Deportivo, Cacahuatique

=== United States ===
- Eddie Ababio – Aguila
- Benyam Philippe Astorga – Aguila
- Matthias Bonvehi – Isidro Metapan
- Wilfredo Cienfuegos - Limeno
- Oscar Sorto - Santa Tecla
- Ricardo Velazco - Isidro Metapan
- David White - Santa Clara

== Europe – UEFA ==
=== France ===
- Hugo Bargas - FAS

=== Germany ===
- Marcus Kothner – Limeno
- Rugvao Leichiz – Aguila

=== Italy ===
- Ricardo Bellancanzone – Atlético Marte

=== Portugal ===
- Diogo Figueiras - FAS

=== Spain ===
- **Gregori Diaz** - Isidro Metapan, Aguila
- Carlos Martínez Aibar – Luis Angel Firpo
- Juan Ramón García Martínez - Isidro Metapan
- Manu Dimas - Isidro Metapan

== Notes ==
Notes:
