= Primera División de Fútbol Profesional Clausura 2008 =

Primera División de Fútbol Profesional de El Salvador
- Dates: 9 February 2008 - 1 June 2008
- Champions: C.D. Luis Angel Firpo (9th title)
- Relegated: Once Municipal
- 2008–09 CONCACAF Champions League: A.D. Isidro Metapán
- Top goalscorer: (El Salvador) Williams Reyes (14)

The Clausura 2008 Primera División de Fútbol Profesional season was the 39th since its establishment in 1969.

It began on 9 February 2008 and ended with the final on 1 June 2008.

Reigning champions Luis Ángel Firpo defended their title beating FAS in the final.

Once Municipal were relegated to the second tier.

== Team information ==
=== Personnel and sponsoring ===
Team	Chairman	Head coach	Kitmaker	Shirt sponsor
Águila	(El Salvador)	(Peru) Agustin Castillo	TBD	TBD
Alianza	(El Salvador)	(Argentina) Pablo Centrone	TBD	TBD
C.D. Chalatenango	(El Salvador)	(Serbia) Vladan Vicevic		
FAS	(El Salvador) Reynaldo Valle	(El Salvador) Nelson Mauricio Ancheta	TBD	TBD
Firpo	(El Salvador) TBD	(Argentina) Gerardo Reinoso	TBD	TBD
Isidro Metapan	(El Salvador)	(El Salvador) Edwin Portillo	TBD	TBD
Nejapa F.C.	(El Salvador)	(El Salvador) Mauricio Cienfuegos	TBD	TBD
Once Municipal	(El Salvador) TBD	(Argentina) Hugo Coria	TBD	TBD
San Salvador F.C.	(El Salvador) Marco Flores	(El Salvador) Oscar Emigdio Benitez	TBD	TBD
C.D. Vista Hermosa	(El Salvador) TBD	(Argentina) Jorge Alberto Garcia	TBD	TBD

== Managerial changes ==
=== Before the season ===
Team	Outgoing manager	Manner of departure	Date of vacancy	Replaced by	Date of appointment	Position in table
Nejapa F.C.	(El Salvador) Carlos Antonio Melendez	TBD	December 2007	(El Salvador) Mauricio Cienfuegos	December 2007	
Firpo	(Argentina) Horacio Cordero	TBD	December 2007	(Argentina) Gerardo Reinoso	December 2007	
Aguila	(El Salvador) Luis Ramirez Zapata	TBD	December 2007	(Peru) Agustín Castillo	January 2008	

=== During the season ===
Team	Outgoing manager	Manner of departure	Date of vacancy	Replaced by	Date of appointment	Position in table
C.D. Chalatenango	(Serbia) Vladan Vicevic	TBD	February 2008	(El Salvador) Juan Ramón Sánchez	February 2008	
C.D. Vista Hermosa	(Argentina) Jorge García	TBD	February 2008	(Colombia) Henry Vanegas	March 2008	
Once Municipal	(Argentina) Hugo Coria	TBD	March 2008	(El Salvador) Juan Ramón Paredes	March 2008	
San Salvador F.C.	(El Salvador) Óscar Benítez	TBD	March 2008	(Uruguay) Rubén Alonso	March 2008	
Once Municipal	(El Salvador) Juan Ramon Paredes	TBD	April 2008	(El Salvador) Mario Elias Guevara	May 2008	

== Standings ==
Last updated May 23, 2008

Pos	Team	Pld	W	D	L	GF	GA	GD	Pts
1	C.D. Luis Ángel Firpo	18	8	8	2	39	27	+12	32
2	A.D. Isidro Metapán	18	8	8	2	29	15	+14	32
3	C.D. FAS	18	8	6	4	26	21	+5	30
4	C.D. Vista Hermosa	18	8	6	4	20	15	+5	30
5	C.D. Chalatenango	18	6	7	5	29	25	+4	25
6	Alianza F.C.	18	5	7	6	20	18	+2	22
7	C.D. Águila	18	5	6	7	25	32	−7	21
8	Nejapa F.C.	18	4	7	7	20	26	−6	19
9	Once Municipal	18	1	9	8	11	24	−13	12
10	San Salvador F.C.	18	2	6	10	14	30	−16	12

== Aggregate table ==
Pos	Team	Pld	W	D	L	GF	GA	GD	Pts	Qualification or relegation
1	A.D. Isidro Metapán	36	16	13	7	70	51	+19	61	
2	C.D. FAS	36	17	9	10	53	42	+11	60	
3	C.D. Luis Ángel Firpo	36	15	14	7	52	32	+20	59	
4	C.D. Chalatenango	36	16	11	9	58	41	+17	59	
5	C.D. Vista Hermosa	36	16	9	11	44	40	+4	57	
6	Alianza F.C.	36	11	13	12	46	46	0	46	
7	C.D. Águila	36	12	10	14	48	52	−4	46	
8	Nejapa F.C.	36	9	14	13	51	60	−9	41	
9	San Salvador F.C.	36	5	12	19	34	65	−31	27	Relegation Playoff
10	Once Municipal	36	5	11	20	19	46	−27	26	Relegated to Segunda Division

== Semifinals 1st leg ==
21 May 2008

Vista Hermosa	1–0	Luis Ángel Firpo
Pompilio Cacho

Estadio Luis Amílcar Moreno

21 May 2008

FAS	3–0	Isidro Metapán
César Larios; Juan Carlos Moscoso

Estadio Oscar Quiteño

== Semifinals 2nd leg ==
25 May 2008

Luis Ángel Firpo	3–0	Vista Hermosa
Carlos Calderón; Patricio Barroche; Fernando Leguizamón

Estadio Cuscatlán

24 May 2008

Isidro Metapán	2–0	FAS
Álex Escobar; Paolo Suárez

Estadio Jorge Calero Suárez

== Final ==
1 June 2008

Luis Ángel Firpo	1–0 (a.e.t.)	FAS
Guillermo Morán 118' (pen.)

Estadio Cuscatlán

Firpo
GK	(El Salvador) Juan José Gómez
DF	(El Salvador) Carlos Monteagudo	Substituted off
DF	(El Salvador) Mauricio Quintanilla
DF	(El Salvador) Manuel Salazar
DF	(El Salvador) Jorge Elenilson Sánchez
MF	(El Salvador) Rubén Quijada
MF	(El Salvador) Eduardo Campos
MF	(Argentina) Leonardo Pekarnik	Substituted off
MF	(El Salvador) Emerson Veliz	Substituted off
FW	(Argentina) Fernando Leguizamón
FW	(Argentina) Patricio Barroche
Substitutes:
FW	(El Salvador) Cristian Sánchez	Substituted on
MF	(El Salvador) Guillermo Morán	Substituted on
MF	(El Salvador) Francisco Medrano	Substituted on
Manager:
(Argentina) Gerardo Reinoso

FAS:
GK	(El Salvador) Adolfo Menéndez
DF	(El Salvador) Ramon Flores
DF	(El Salvador) Dony Valle
DF	(El Salvador) Marvin González
DF	(El Salvador) Alfredo Pacheco
DF	(El Salvador) Oscar Jimenez
MF	(El Salvador) Cristian Álvarez	Substituted on
MF	(El Salvador) Víctor Merino	Substituted on
MF	(El Salvador) Juan Carlos Moscoso
FW	(Argentina) Alejandro Bentos
FW	(El Salvador) Cesar Larios
Substitutes:
DF	(El Salvador) Emerson Umaña	Substituted on
MF	(El Salvador) Odir Josue Flores	Substituted on
FW	(Panama) Orlando Rodríguez	Substituted on
Manager:
(El Salvador) Nelson Ancheta

=== Champion ===
Clausura 2007-08 champion

9th title

Since Luis Ángel Firpo already qualified for 2008–09 CONCACAF Champions League, Isidro Metapán also qualified.

== Top scorers ==
Pos	Player	Team	Goals
1.	(Honduras) Williams Reyes	A.D. Isidro Metapán	14
2.	(Argentina) Patricio Barroche	C.D. Luis Ángel Firpo	13
3.	(Uruguay) Juan Carlos Reyes	Nejapa F.C.	9
4.	(El Salvador) Rodolfo Zelaya	C.D. Chalatenango	8
	(Honduras) Franklin Webster	C.D. Chalatenango	8
5.	(Honduras) Pompilio Cacho Valerio	C.D. Vista Hermosa	7

== List of foreign players in the league ==
This is a list of foreign players in Clausura 2008. The following players:

1. have played at least one apertura game for the respective club.
2. have not been capped for the El Salvador national football team on any level, independently from the birthplace

A new rule was introduced this season that clubs can only have three foreign players per club and can only add a new player if there is an injury or player/s is released.

C.D. Águila

- (Panama) Nicolás Muñoz
- (Colombia) Fernando Zuleta
- (Honduras) Fabio Ulloa
- (Colombia) Juan Camilo Mejía

Alianza F.C.

- (Mexico) Arturo Albarrán

Chalatenango

- (Honduras) Franklin Webster
- (Colombia) Alexander Lugo
- (Colombia) John Jairo García
- (Peru) Julio Manrique
- (Peru) Ricardo Magallanes

C.D. FAS

- (Argentina) Alejandro Bentos
- (Panama) Orlando Rodríguez
- (Sierra Leone) Yussuf Sindeh
- (Colombia) Jairo Hurtado

C.D. Luis Ángel Firpo

- (Argentina) Patricio Barroche
- (Argentina) Fernando Leguizamón
- (Argentina) Leonardo Pekarnik
- (Chile) Ramón Ávila

(player released mid season) Injury replacement player

Nejapa FC

- (Uruguay) Juan Carlos Reyes
- (Mexico) Jose Luis Osorio
- (Uruguay) Luis Espindola
- (Peru) Hilario Suma

A.D. Isidro Metapán

- (Uruguay) Paolo Suarez
- (Honduras) Williams Reyes
- (Brazil) Marcelo Messias
- (Paraguay) Gabriel Garcete

Once Municipal

- (Honduras) Ernesto Noel Aquino
- (Brazil) Dimas Braz
- (Argentina) Carlos Escalante
- (Ecuador) Moisés Cuero
- (Ecuador) Javier Angulo
- (Peru) Harry Huayta

San Salvador F.C.

- (Panama) Francisco Portillo
- (Colombia) Bernardo Jaramillo
- (Colombia) Cristian Mosquera
- (Argentina) Lucas Abraham

Vista Hermosa

- (Honduras) Pompilio Cacho Valerio
- (Colombia) Luis Torres Rodriguez
- (Colombia) Elder Figueroa
