= Primera División de Fútbol Profesional – Clausura 2012 =

Primera División de Fútbol de El Salvador
- Season: Clausura 2012
- Champions: Águila (15th Title)
- Relegated: Vista Hermosa
- Champions League: Águila; FAS
- Matches: 90
- Goals: 254 (2.82 per match)
- Top goalscorer: Nicolás Muñoz (12); Anel Canales (12)
- Biggest home win: Once Municipal 5-0 FAS (January 25, 2012); Águila 5-0 Atlético Marte (March 3, 2012); Juventud Independiente 5-0 UES (April 4, 2012); Águila 5-0 Vista Hermosa (April 4, 2012)
- Biggest away win: Atlético Marte 0-4 Luis Ángel Firpo (January 8, 2012)
- Highest scoring: Luis Ángel Firpo 4-4 Alianza (January 26, 2012)
- Longest winning run: 4 games by: Águila and Isidro Metapán
- Longest unbeaten run: 18 games by: Isidro Metapán
- Longest winless run: 7 games by: Alianza and UES
- Longest losing run: 4 games by: Vista Hermosa

The Clausura 2012 season was the 28th edition of Primera División de Fútbol de El Salvador since its establishment of an Apertura and Clausura format. Isidro Metapán headed into this tournament as the defending champions. The season began on January 8, 2012 and concluded in mid-year. As in previous years, the league consisted of 10 teams, each playing a home and away game against every other club for a total of 18 per club during the season.. The top four teams by the end of the regular season took part in the playoffs.

== Stadia and locations ==
Location of teams in Apertura 2011/Clausura 2012

Team	Home city	Stadium	Capacity
Águila	San Miguel	Juan Francisco Barraza	10,000
Alianza	San Salvador	Estadio Cuscatlán	45,925
Atlético Marte	San Salvador	Estadio Cuscatlán	45,925
FAS	Santa Ana	Estadio Óscar Quiteño	15,000
Isidro Metapán	Metapán	Estadio Jorge Calero Suárez	8,000
Juventud Independiente	San Juan Opico	Complejo Municipal	5,000
Luís Ángel Firpo	Usulután	Estadio Sergio Torres	5,000
Once Municipal	Ahuachapán	Estadio Simeón Magaña	5,000
UES	San Salvador	Estadio Universitario UES	10,000
Vista Hermosa	San Francisco Gotera	Estadio Correcaminos	12,000

=== Personnel and sponsoring ===
Team	Chairman	Head coach	Kitmaker	Shirt sponsor
Águila	(El Salvador) Julio Sosa	(Brazil) Eraldo Correia	Galaxia	Mister Donuts, Volkswagen, Impressa Repuestos, Soccerway
Alianza	(El Salvador) Lisandro Pohl	(El Salvador) (Serbia) Vladan Vićević	Lotto	Tigo, SINAI, Maseca, BIC
Atlético Marte	(El Salvador) Felix Guardado	(El Salvador) Fausto Omar Vásquez	Galaxia	Foskrol, La Curacao, UFG
FAS	(El Salvador) David Lineras	(El Salvador) Ricardo Mena Laguán	Milan (Jaguar Sportic)	Pepsi, Farmacia San Lorenzo, Alba Petróleos
Isidro Metapán	(El Salvador) Rafael Morataya	(El Salvador) Edwin Portillo	Milán (Jaguar Sportic)	Grupo Bimbo, Tigo, Arroz San Pedro
Juventud Independiente	(El Salvador) Romeo Barillas	(El Salvador) Juan Ramón Sánchez	Milán (Jaguar Sportic)	Alcaldía Municipal de San Juan Opico, Ria, CP Portillo
Luis Ángel Firpo	(El Salvador) Enrique Escobar	(El Salvador) Nelson Ancheta	Joma	Pilsener, Volkswagen, Redes, Burger King
Once Municipal	(El Salvador) Andrés Rodríguez	(Argentina) Juan Andrés Sarulyte	Milan (Jaguar Sportic)	LA GEO, Milan (Jaguar Sportic), Tropigas
UES	(El Salvador) Rufino Quesada	(Paraguay) Roberto Gamarra	Galaxia	Alba Petróleos
Vista Hermosa	(El Salvador) Francisco Benitez	(El Salvador) Carlos Romero	Milan (Jaguar Sportic)	MK Medicamentos, Cetron, Comercial René

== Managerial changes ==
=== Before the start of the season ===
Team	Outgoing manager	Manner of departure	Date of vacancy	Replaced by	Date of appointment	Position in table
Águila	(El Salvador) Omar Sevilla	resigned to manage the reserves		(Brazil) Eraldo Correia		5th (Clausura 2011)
FAS	(El Salvador) Willian Renderos Iraheta	Resigned		(El Salvador) Ricardo Mena Laguán		2nd (Clausura 2011)
Vista Hermosa	(El Salvador) José Rolando Pérez	Moved to Aguila		(El Salvador) Carlos Romero		10th (Clausura 2011)
UES	(El Salvador) Jorge Abrego	replaced and moved to coaching reserves		(Paraguay) Roberto Gamarra		9th (Clausura 2011)

=== During the regular season ===
Team	Outgoing manager	Manner of departure	Date of vacancy	Replaced by	Date of appointment	Position in table
Alianza	(El Salvador) (Serbia) Vladan Vićević	Resigned	January 19, 2012	(El Salvador) Leonel Cárcamo	January 25, 2012	7th (Clausura 2012)
Atlético Marte	(El Salvador) Fausto Omar Vásquez	Resigned	January 29, 2012	(Argentina) Jorge Alberto García	January 29, 2012	10th (Clausura 2012)
Águila	(Brazil) Eraldo Correia	Sacked	January 30, 2012	(El Salvador) Victor Coreas	January 30, 2012	7th (Clausura 2012)
Vista	(El Salvador) Carlos Romero	Sacked	February 5, 2012	(Honduras) José Efraín Núñez	February 6, 2012	9th (Clausura 2012)
Alianza	(El Salvador) Leonel Cárcamo	Replaced and moved to assistant coach	February 6, 2012	(El Salvador) Juan Ramón Paredes	February 6, 2012	7th (Clausura 2012)
FAS	(El Salvador) Ricardo Mena Laguán	Sacked	February 9, 2012	(Peru) Agustín Castillo	February 9, 2012	8th (Clausura 2012)

== League table ==
Pos	Team	Pld	W	D	L	GF	GA	GD	Pts	Qualification
1	Isidro Metapán	18	10	8	0	34	15	+19	38	Qualification for playoffs (Note: FAS won the extra game by 3-0 against Once Municipal for the last place of the playoffs.)
2	Águila (C)	18	9	2	7	28	18	+10	29	Qualification for playoffs
3	Luis Ángel Firpo	18	7	7	4	30	23	+7	28	Qualification for playoffs
4	Once Municipal	18	7	6	5	25	13	+12	27	Qualification for playoffs
5	FAS	18	6	9	3	24	23	+1	27	Qualification for playoffs
6	Juventud Independiente	18	6	7	5	31	24	+7	25	
7	UES	18	5	4	9	24	36	−12	19	
8	Atlético Marte	18	4	5	9	17	29	−12	17	
9	Alianza	18	3	6	9	25	40	−15	15	
10	Vista Hermosa	18	3	6	9	17	34	−17	15	

Updated to match(es) played on April 15, 2012. Source: elgrafico.com
Rules for classification: 1) points; 2) goal difference; 3) number of goals scored.
(C) Champions

=== Positions by round ===
Team ╲ Round	1	2	3	4	5	6	7	8	9	10	11	12	13	14	15	16	17	18
Isidro Metapán	2	3	4	2	2	1	1	1	1	1	1	1	1	1	1	1	1	1
Águila	9	9	8	6	7	5	4	2	2	3	3	3	4	3	3	2	2	2
Luis Ángel Firpo	1	1	1	1	1	2	2	3	3	2	2	2	2	2	2	3	3	3
Once Municipal	4	6	3	5	4	4	3	4	4	4	4	4	3	4	4	4	4	4
FAS	6	7	6	7	8	8	8	6	7	7	7	6	5	5	5	5	5	5
Juventud Independiente	8	4	5	8	5	6	6	7	5	6	6	7	7	6	6	6	6	6
UES	3	2	2	3	3	3	5	5	6	5	5	5	6	7	7	7	7	7
Atlético Marte	10	10	10	10	10	10	10	8	9	8	9	9	10	10	10	8	8	8
Alianza	7	5	7	4	6	7	7	9	8	9	8	8	8	9	9	10	9	9
Vista Hermosa	5	8	9	9	9	9	9	10	10	10	10	10	9	8	8	9	10	10

Source: soccerway.com
= Leader; = Qualification to the playoffs; = Last place

== Results ==
Home \ Away	ÁGU	ALI	ATM	FAS	FIR	MET	JUV	OMU	UES	VIS
Águila		2–0	5–0	2–0	1–0	0–1	2–2	1–0	1–3	5–0
Alianza	1–3		1–0	2–2	3–3	2–2	2–1	1–1	2–4	1–2
Atlético Marte	0–2	2–3		0–1	0–4	0–2	1–2	1–0	2–1	4–1
C.D. FAS	2–0	3–0	1–1		2–2	1–1	1–0	2–1	4–1	1–1
Luis Ángel Firpo	1–1	4–4	0–0	3–0		2–4	1–0	1–0	2–1	2–1
Isidro Metapán	4–1	3–0	1–1	1–1	2–1		4–1	1–0	1–0	3–1
Juventud Independiente	2–1	3–0	4–2	1–1	0–0	1–1		2–2	5–0	2–0
Once Municipal	1–0	2–1	0–0	5–0	0–0	0–0	2–1		4–1	3–0
C.D. Universidad de El Salvador	1–0	2–1	0–2	1–1	3–4	1–1	2–2	1–1		0–2
Vista Hermosa	0–1	1–1	1–1	1–1	1–0	2–2	2–2	0–3	1–2	

Updated to match(es) played on April 15, 2012. Source: soccerway.com
Legend: Blue = home team win; Yellow = draw; Red = away team win.

== Playoffs ==
Semifinals
1	Isidro Metapán	0	3	3
4	FAS	2	0	2
2	Águila	4	1	5
3	L.A. Firpo	0	2	2

Final
1	Isidro Metapán	1
2	Águila	2

=== Semi-finals ===
==== First leg ====
April 22, 2012
16:00 UTC-6

FAS	2–0	Isidro Metapán
Reyes 11'; Ulloa 43'	Report

Estadio Óscar Quiteño, Santa Ana
Attendance: 12,053
Referee: Jaime Ahid Carpio

April 22, 2012
15:00 UTC-6

Luis Ángel Firpo	0–4	Águila
	Report	Darwin Bonilla 8', 39'; Osael Romero 70'; Rolando Torres 86'

Estadio Cuscatlan, San Salvador
Referee: Marlon Mejía

==== Second leg ====
April 28, 2012
19:00 UTC-6

Isidro Metapán	3–0	FAS
Alfredo Pacheco 55'; Christian Bautista 62'; Edwin Sánchez 77'	Report

Estadio Jorge Calero Suarez, Metapán
Attendance: 4,214
Referee: Joel Aguilar

Isidro Metapán won 3-2 on aggregate.

April 28, 2012
19:00 UTC-6

Águila	1–2	Luis Ángel Firpo
Nicolás Muñoz 90'	Report	Ederson Buendía 36'; Jaime Alas 80'

Estadio Juan Francisco Barraza, San Miguel
Attendance: 6,065
Referee: Elmer Bonilla

Águila won 5-2 on aggregate.

=== Final ===
May 6, 2012
15:00 UTC-6

Isidro Metapán	1–2	Águila
Ramón Sánchez 78'	Report	Osael Romero 38' (pen.); Nicolás Muñoz 70'

Estadio Cuscatlán, San Salvador
Attendance: 18,506
Referee: Joel Aguilar

Isidro Metapán:
GK	1	(El Salvador) Miguel Montes	(yellow card) 37'
DF	23	(El Salvador) Ricardo Alvarado	(substituted off) 54'
DF	19	(El Salvador) Alexander Escobar
DF	2	(El Salvador) Milton Molina
DF	15	(El Salvador) Alfredo Pacheco	(yellow card) 26'
MF	20	(El Salvador) Omar Mejía
MF	53	(El Salvador) Marvin Monterrosa	(substituted off) 54'
MF	16	(El Salvador) Ramón Sánchez	(yellow card) 68'
MF	12	(El Salvador) Edwin Sánchez
FW	17	(El Salvador) Léster Blanco
FW	9	(Brazil) Allan Kardeck	(yellow card) 60' (substituted off) 67'
Substitutes:
FW	11	(El Salvador) Christian Bautista	(substituted on) 54'
MF	6	(El Salvador) Julio Martínez	(substituted on) 54'
FW	30	(Brazil) Leonardo Da Silva	(substituted on) 67'
Manager:
(El Salvador) Edwin Portillo

Águila:
GK	22	(El Salvador) Benji Villalobos	(yellow card) 84'
DF	23	(El Salvador) Luis Anaya
DF	6	(El Salvador) Mardoqueo Henríquez
DF	4	(Brazil) Glaúber da Silva	(substituted off) 17'
DF	13	(El Salvador) Deris Umanzor
MF	24	(El Salvador) Darwin Bonilla	(substituted off) 80'
DF	3	(El Salvador) Isaac Zelaya
MF	8	(El Salvador) Osael Romero
MF	15	(El Salvador) Ronald Torres
FW	33	(El Salvador) Irza Santos	(yellow card) 42' (substituted off) 59'
FW	19	(Panama) Nicolás Muñoz
Substitutes:
DF	48	(El Salvador) Henry Romero	(substituted on) 17' (yellow card) 63'
MF	7	(El Salvador) Irving Flores	(substituted on) 59'
DF	2	(El Salvador) Rolando Torres	(substituted on) 80'
Manager:
(El Salvador) Víctor Coreas

Clausura 2012 champions

15th title

== Player statistics ==
=== Top scorers ===
Rank	Scorer	Club	Goals
1	(Panama) Nicolás Muñoz	Águila	12
1	(Panama) Anel Canales	Luis Ángel Firpo	12
3	(Uruguay) Juan Carlos Reyes	Juventud Independiente	10
4	(El Salvador) Alexander Campos	Once Municipal	7
4	(Jamaica) Sean Fraser	Alianza	7
4	(El Salvador) Christian Bautista	Isidro Metapán	7
4	(El Salvador) César Larios	UES	7
4	(El Salvador) Álex Erazo	Juventud Independiente	7
4	(El Salvador) Marvin Monterrosa	Isidro Metapán	7
10	(El Salvador) Osael Romero	Águila	6

Updated to games played on April 15, 2012.
Post-season goals are not included, only regular season goals.

==== Bookings ====
Rank	Team	Yellow card	Red card	Total
1	Vista Hermosa	27	1	28
2	Luis Ángel Firpo	39	2	41
3	Juventud Independiente	40	4	44
4	Atlético Marte	42	4	46
5	Águila	44	6	50
6	Isidro Metapán	49	3	52
7	UES	49	6	55
8	Once Municipal	55	4	59
9	FAS	54	6	60
10	Alianza	56	10	76
	Total	455	46	501

Updated to games played on April 15, 2012.

==== Goalkeepers ====
Goalkeeper	Goals	Matches	Average	Team
(El Salvador) Miguel Montes	10	12	0.83	Isidro Metapán
(El Salvador) Rafael Fuentes	11	12	0.92	Once Municipal
(El Salvador) Benji Villalobos	15	15	1.00	Águila
(El Salvador) Javier Gómez	19	16	1.19	Atlético Marte
(El Salvador) Luis Contreras	22	18	1.22	FAS
(El Salvador) Dagoberto Portillo	22	18	1.22	Luis Ángel Firpo
(El Salvador) Wilber Ramírez	22	17	1.29	Juventud Independiente
(El Salvador) Manuel González	26	15	1.73	UES
(El Salvador) Aníbal Peña	34	18	1.89	Vista Hermosa
(El Salvador) Yimmy Cuéllar	19	10	1.90	Alianza

Updated to games played on April 15, 2012.
Post-season goals are not included, only regular season goals.

=== Hat-tricks ===
Player	No. of goals	Time of goals	Representing	Final score	Opponent	Round
(El Salvador) Marvin Monterrosa	3	15', 66', 90'	Isidro Metapán	3–1	Vista Hermosa	12th
(Uruguay) Juan Carlos Reyes	3	7', 38', 74'	Juventud Independiente	5–0	UES	17th

=== Individual awards ===
Hombre GOL	Best Coach Award	Best Goalkeeper Award	Fair Player Award	Rookie Player Award
(Panama) Nicolás Muñoz; Águila (Panama) Anel Canales; Luis Ángel Firpo	(El Salvador) Edwin Portillo; Isidro Metapán	(El Salvador) Miguel Montes; Isidro Metapán	(El Salvador) César Larios; UES	(El Salvador) Otoniel Salinas; Vista Hermosa

== Season statistics ==
=== Scoring ===
- First goal of the season: (El Salvador) José Otoniel Salinas for Vista Hermosa against FAS, 4 minutes (January 7, 2012)
- Fastest goal in a match:2 minutes - (El Salvador) José Lemus for Atlético Marte against Alianza (March 4, 2012)
- Goal scored at the latest point in a match: 90+10 minutes (El Salvador) Alexander Larin for Atlético Marte against FAS (January 21, 2012)
- First penalty Kick of the season: (Panama) Anel Canales for Luis Ángel Firpo against Atlético Marte, 48 minutes (January 8, 2012)
- Widest winning margin: 5 Goals
  - Once Municipal 5–0 FAS (January 25, 2012)
  - Águila 5–0 Atlético Marte (March 8, 2012)
  - Juventud Independiente 5–0 UES (April 4, 2012)
  - Águila 5–0 Vista Hermosa (April 4, 2012)
- First hat-trick of the season: (El Salvador) Marvin Monterrosa for Isidro Metapán against Vista Hermosa (March 28, 2012)
- First own goal of the season: (El Salvador) Carlos Arévalo (Alianza) for UES, 37 minutes (January 7, 2012)
- Most goals by one team in a match: 5 Goals
  - Once Municipal 5–0 FAS (January 25, 2012)
  - Águila 5–0 Atlético Marte (March 8, 2012)
  - Juventud Independiente 5–0 UES (April 4, 2012)
  - Águila 5–0 Vista Hermosa (April 4, 2012)
- Most goals in one half by one team:
- Most goals scored by losing team: 3 Goals
  - UES 3–4 Luis Ángel Firpo (April 15, 2012)
- Most goals by one player in a single match: 3 Goals
  - (El Salvador) Marvin Monterrosa for Isidro Metapán against Vista Hermosa (March 28, 2012)
  - (Uruguay) Juan Carlos Reyes for Juventud Independiente against UES (April 4, 2012)

=== Discipline ===
- First yellow card of the season: (El Salvador) Nelson Bonilla for Alianza against UES, 5 minutes (January 7, 2012)
- First red card of the season: (El Salvador) Nelson Bonilla for Alianza against UES, 9 minutes (January 7, 2012)
- Card given at latest point in a game: Red (El Salvador) José Enrique Rodríguez for Juventud Independiente, 90+3 minutes against UES (February 11, 2012)

== Aggregate table ==
Pos	Team	Pld	W	D	L	GF	GA	GD	Pts	Qualification or relegation
1	Isidro Metapán (C)	36	21	11	4	66	36	+30	74	Qualification for 2012–13 CONCACAF Champions League Group stage (Note: Because Belize does not have a stadium which meets CONCACAF'S minimum standards for the Champions League, the spot normally reserved for Belize's club champion was reallocated to El Salvador, since it was the only Central American nation to send a team to the 2011–12 CONCACAF Champions League quarterfinals.)
2	FAS	36	15	14	7	48	40	+8	59	Qualification for 2012–13 CONCACAF Champions League Group stage
3	Águila (C)	36	17	7	12	62	43	+19	58	Qualification for 2012–13 CONCACAF Champions League Group stage
4	Once Municipal	36	15	12	9	54	32	+22	57	
5	Luis Ángel Firpo	36	15	12	9	61	50	+11	57	
6	Juventud Independiente	36	11	9	16	49	54	−5	42	
7	Atlético Marte	36	10	10	16	38	50	−12	40	
8	Alianza	36	9	12	15	43	57	−14	39	
9	UES	36	7	12	17	39	65	−26	33	
10	Vista Hermosa (R)	36	4	13	19	28	59	−31	25	Relegation to Segunda División

Source: elgrafico.com
Rules for classification: 1) points; 2) goal difference; 3) number of goals scored.
(C) Champions; (R) Relegated

== List of foreign players in the league ==
This is a list of foreign players in Clausura 2012. The following players:

1. have played at least one apertura game for the respective club.
2. have not been capped for the El Salvador national football team on any level, independently from the birthplace

A new rule was introduced a few season ago, that clubs can only have three foreign players per club and can only add a new player if there is an injury or player/s is released.

C.D. Águila

- (Brazil) Glaúber da Silva
- (Brazil) Rómulo
- TBA

Alianza F.C.

- (Cuba) Yaikel Pérez
- (Jamaica) Sean Fraser
- (Brazil) Willer Souza

Atlético Marte

- (Ghana) James Owusu-Ansah
- (Uruguay) Alcides Bandera
- (Jamaica) Garrick Gordon

Juventud Independiente

- (Uruguay) Juan Carlos Reyes
- (Colombia) Cristian Adolfo González
- (Argentina) Maximiliano Alexis Villega

C.D. FAS

- (Argentina) Alejandro Bentos
- (Costa Rica) Rodolfo Rodríguez (footballer)
- (Brazil) Marcio Teruel

(player released mid season)

C.D. Luis Ángel Firpo

- (Panama) Anel Canales
- (Colombia) Luis Torres
- (Colombia) Ederson Buendía

A.D. Isidro Metapán

- (Honduras) Ernesto Aquino
- (Brazil) Allan Kardeck
- (Brazil) Leonardo Da Silva

Once Municipal

- (Mexico) Pablo Hütt
- (Colombia) Andrés Medina
- (Panama) Anthony Basile

UES

- (Colombia) John Castillo
- (Costa Rica) Gustavo Peña
- TBA

Vista Hermosa

- (Honduras) Bonel Ávila
- (Colombia) Juan Camilo Mejía
- (Honduras) Pompilio Cacho Valerio
- (Honduras) Hugo Sarmiento
