= Primera División de Fútbol Profesional – Apertura 2012 =

Primera División de Fútbol de El Salvador
- Season: Apertura 2012
- Champions: Isidro Metapán (7th Title)
- Relegated: "None"
- Champions League: Isidro Metapán
- Matches: 90
- Goals: 270 (3 per match)
- Top goalscorer: Nicolás Muñoz (12); Sean Fraser (12)
- Biggest home win: Alianza 7-1 Santa Tecla (July 22, 2012)
- Biggest away win: UES 1-4 Isidro Metapán (August 29, 2012); Once Municipal 0-4 Águila (October 21, 2012); Independiente 1-4 Isidro Metapán (11 November 2012)
- Highest scoring: Alianza 7-1 Santa Tecla (July 22, 2012)
- Longest winning run: 3 games by Águila, Alianza, Isidro Metapán, FAS, Santa Tecla and Atlético Marte
- Longest unbeaten run: 10 games by FAS
- Longest winless run: 9 games by Once Municipal
- Longest losing run: 8 games by Once Municipal
- Total attendance: 165,215
- Average attendance: 1,835

The Apertura 2012 season (officially known as Torneo Apertura 2012 or also known as the Copa Capri for sponsoring reasons) was the 29th edition of El Salvador's Primera División since its establishment of an Apertura and Clausura format. C.D. Águila headed into this tournament as the defending champions. The season began on 14 July 2012 and concluded in the end of the year. Like previous years, the league consisted of 10 teams, each playing a home and away game against the other clubs for a total of 18 games per club during the season. The top four teams by the end of the regular season took part in the playoffs.

== Team information ==
A total of 10 teams contested the league, including 9 sides from Apertura 2011 and Clausura 2012 and one promoted from the 2011–12 Segunda División.

Vista Hermosa were relegated to 2012–13 Segunda División the previous season.

The relegated team were replaced by 2011–12 Segunda División Playoffs promotion. Santa Tecla won the Clausura 2012 title, this led to take part of the promotion playoffs alone the Apertura 2011 champions side Titán. Santa Tecla won the playoffs by the score of 2–1 .

=== Promotion and relegation ===
Promoted from Segunda División de Fútbol Salvadoreño as of June 6, 2012.

- Champions: Santa Tecla F.C.

Relegated to Segunda División de Fútbol Salvadoreño as of June 6, 2012.

- Last Place: Vista Hermosa

=== Stadia and locations ===
Location of teams in Apertura 2012/Clausura 2013

| Team | Home city | Stadium | Capacity |
|---|---|---|---|
| Águila | San Miguel | Juan Francisco Barraza | 10,000 |
| Alianza | San Salvador | Estadio Cuscatlán | 45,925 |
| Atlético Marte | San Salvador | Estadio Cuscatlán | 45,925 |
| FAS | Santa Ana | Estadio Óscar Quiteño | 15,000 |
| Isidro Metapán | Metapán | Estadio Jorge Calero Suárez | 8,000 |
| Juventud Independiente | San Juan Opico | Complejo Municipal | 5,000 |
| Luís Ángel Firpo | Usulután | Estadio Sergio Torres | 5,000 |
| Once Municipal | Ahuachapán | Estadio Simeón Magaña | 5,000 |
| Santa Tecla | Santa Tecla | Estadio Las Delicias | 10,000 |
| UES | San Salvador | Estadio Universitario UES | 10,000 |

=== Personnel and sponsoring ===
| Team | Chairman | Head coach | Kitmaker | Shirt sponsor |
|---|---|---|---|---|
| Águila | (El Salvador) Julio Sosa | (El Salvador) Victor Coreas | Diadora | Mister Donut, Volkswagen, Impressa Repuestos, Soccerway |
| Alianza | (El Salvador) Lisandro Pohl | (Argentina) Ramiro Cepeda | Lotto | Tigo, SINAI, Maseca |
| Atlético Marte | (El Salvador) Hugo Carrillo | (Argentina) Jorge Alberto García | Galaxia | Rosvill, Foskrol, La Curaçao, UFG, Vive |
| FAS | (El Salvador) Rafael Villacorta | (Peru) Agustín Castillo | Mitre | Pepsi, Farmacia San Lorenzo, Alba Petróleos, Continental Motor |
| Isidro Metapán | (El Salvador) Rafael Morataya | (El Salvador) Edwin Portillo | Milán (Jaguar Sportic) | Grupo Bimbo, Tigo, Arroz San Pedro, Holan |
| Juventud Independiente | (El Salvador) Romeo Barillas | (El Salvador) Juan Ramón Sánchez | Milán (Jaguar Sportic) | Alcaldía Municipal de San Juan Opico, Ria, CP Portillo |
| Luis Ángel Firpo | (El Salvador) Enrique Escobar | (El Salvador) Edgar Henriquez "Kiko" | Joma | Pilsener, Volkswagen, Diana, Tigo |
| Once Municipal | (El Salvador) Oswaldo Magaña | (Argentina) Juan Andres Sarulyte | Milan (Jaguar Sportic) | LA GEO, Milan (Jaguar Sportic), Tropigas |
| Santa Tecla | (El Salvador) Óscar Ortiz | (El Salvador) Guillermo Rivera | Galaxia | Mister Donut |
| UES | (El Salvador) Rufino Quesada | (El Salvador) Jorge Abrego | Galaxia | Alba Petróleos |

== Managerial changes ==
=== Before the start of the season ===
| Team | Outgoing manager | Manner of departure | Date of vacancy | Replaced by | Date of appointment | Position in table |
|---|---|---|---|---|---|---|
| Alianza F.C. | (El Salvador) Juan Ramón Paredes | Sacked | 14 April 2012 | (Argentina) Ramiro Cepeda | 4 May 2012 | 9th (Clausura 2012) |
| Once Municipal | (Argentina) Juan Andrés Sarulyte | Resigned to become assistant coach of the national team | 23 April 2012 | (El Salvador) Leonel Cárcamo | 4 June 2012 | 4th (Clausura 2012) |
| Luis Ángel Firpo | (El Salvador) Nelso Ancheta | Sacked | 14 May 2012 | (El Salvador) Edgar Henriquez "Kiko" | 4 June 2012 | 3rd (Clausura 2012) |
| Santa Tecla F.C. | (El Salvador) Edgar Henriquez "Kiko" | Resigned to be coach of Firpo | 4 June 2012 | (Argentina) Osvaldo Escudero "El Pichi" | 7 June 2012 | Promoted from the second division |

=== During the regular season ===
| Team | Outgoing manager | Manner of departure | Date of vacancy | Replaced by | Date of appointment | Position in table |
|---|---|---|---|---|---|---|
| Once Municipal | (El Salvador) Leonel Cárcamo | Fired | August 15, 2012 | (Argentina) Juan Andres Sarulyte | August 15, 2012 | 10th (Clausura 2012) |
| Santa Tecla F.C. | (Argentina) Osvaldo Escudero "El Pichi" | Resigned | October 30, 2012 | (El Salvador) Guillermo Rivera | October 31, 2012 | 8th (Clausura 2012) |
| C.D. Universidad de El Salvador | (Paraguay) (Argentina) Roberto Gamarra | Resigned | November 1, 2012 | (El Salvador) Jorge Abrego | November 1, 2012 | 9th (Clausura 2012) |

== League table ==
| Pos | Team | Pld | W | D | L | GF | GA | GD | Pts | Qualification |
|---|---|---|---|---|---|---|---|---|---|---|
| 1 | Isidro Metapán | 18 | 11 | 3 | 4 | 37 | 25 | +12 | 36 | Qualification for playoffs |
| 2 | Alianza | 18 | 10 | 4 | 4 | 36 | 19 | +17 | 34 | Qualification for playoffs |
| 3 | FAS | 18 | 9 | 6 | 3 | 27 | 15 | +12 | 33 | Qualification for playoffs |
| 4 | Águila | 18 | 9 | 4 | 5 | 29 | 19 | +10 | 31 | Qualification for playoffs |
| 5 | Luis Ángel Firpo | 18 | 7 | 4 | 7 | 26 | 24 | +2 | 25 | |
| 6 | Atlético Marte | 18 | 7 | 2 | 9 | 28 | 25 | +3 | 23 | |
| 7 | Santa Tecla | 18 | 5 | 6 | 7 | 24 | 33 | −9 | 21 | |
| 8 | UES | 18 | 4 | 8 | 6 | 20 | 26 | −6 | 20 | |
| 9 | Juventud Independiente | 18 | 4 | 7 | 7 | 27 | 34 | −7 | 19 | |
| 10 | Once Municipal | 18 | 1 | 2 | 15 | 16 | 50 | −34 | 5 | |

Updated to match(es) played on 25 November 2012. Source: elgrafico.com soccerway.com
Rules for classification: 1) points; 2) goal difference; 3) number of goals scored.

== Results ==
| Home \ Away | ÁGU | ALI | ATM | FAS | FIR | MET | JUV | OMU | STE | UES |
|---|---|---|---|---|---|---|---|---|---|---|
| Águila | | 0–3 | 1–3 | 1–1 | 3–2 | 1–2 | 3–0 | 3–0 | 0–0 | 2–1 |
| Alianza | 0–2 | | 2–1 | 3–2 | 1–1 | 0–2 | 2–0 | 2–0 | 7–1 | 1–1 |
| Atlético Marte | 0–1 | 0–2 | | 1–2 | 2–1 | 4–1 | 2–3 | 5–1 | 3–2 | 1–1 |
| C.D. FAS | 0–0 | 2–1 | 2–0 | | 1–1 | 4–1 | 1–0 | 1–0 | 4–1 | 0–0 |
| Luis Ángel Firpo | 0–1 | 0–2 | 0–2 | 1–0 | | 4–2 | 2–3 | 4–2 | 2–0 | 3–2 |
| Isidro Metapán | 3–2 | 1–0 | 1–0 | 2–1 | 1–0 | | 1–1 | 5–0 | 1–1 | 1–2 |
| Juventud Independiente | 2–2 | 0–3 | 4–3 | 0–1 | 1–1 | 1–4 | | 3–3 | 5–1 | 1–1 |
| Once Municipal | 0–4 | 1–2 | 0–1 | 1–3 | 1–3 | 1–3 | 1–1 | | 1–2 | 3–2 |
| Santa Tecla | 1–3 | 2–2 | 0–0 | 2–2 | 0–1 | 2–2 | 1–0 | 4–0 | | 3–0 |
| C.D. Universidad de El Salvador | 1–0 | 3–3 | 1–0 | 0–0 | 0–0 | 1–4 | 2–2 | 2–1 | 0–1 | |

Updated to match(es) played on 25 November 2012. Source: elgrafico soccerway.com
Legend: Blue = home team win; Yellow = draw; Red = away team win.

== Playoffs ==
Semifinals
1 | Isidro Metapán | 2 | 3 | 5
4 | Águila | 1 | 2 | 3
2 | Alianza | 1 | 0 | 1
3 | FAS | 1 | 0 | 1

Final
1 | Isidro Metapán (P) | 1 (5)
2 | Alianza | 1 (4)

=== Semi-finals ===
==== First leg ====
1 December 2012
19:00 UTC−6

| Águila | 1–2 | Isidro Metapán |
|---|---|---|
| Irza Santos 44' | Report | Nicolás Muñoz 36'; Héctor Mejía 38' |

Estadio Juan Francisco Barraza, San Miguel
Attendance: 4,465
Referee: Kenso Araujo

1 December 2012
19:00 UTC−6

| FAS | 1–1 | Alianza |
|---|---|---|
| Ricardo Ulloa 75' | Report | Roberto Maradiaga 42' |

Estadio Óscar Quiteño, Santa Ana
Attendance: 12,544
Referee: Joel Aguilar

==== Second leg ====
8 December 2012
19:00 UTC−6

| Isidro Metapán | 3–2 | Águila |
|---|---|---|
| Paolo Suárez 52'; Nicolás Muñoz 68'; Alfredo Pacheco 72' (pen.) | Report | Darwin Bonilla 45', 57' |

Estadio Jorge Calero Suárez, Metapán
Referee: Marlon Mejía

Isidro Metapán won 5-3 on aggregate.

9 December 2012
15:15 UTC−6

| Alianza | 0–0 | FAS |
|---|---|---|
| | Report |

Estadio Cuscatlán, San Salvador
Attendance: 19,710
Referee: Jaime Carpio

1-1 on aggregate. Alianza advanced due it to better position on the table.

=== Final ===
16 December 2012
15:00 UTC−6

| Isidro Metapán | 1–1 (a.e.t.) | Alianza |
|---|---|---|
| Nicolás Muñoz 106' | Report | Sean Fraser 110' |
Penalties
| Alfredo Pacheco (penalty scored); Julio Martínez (penalty missed); Ramón Sánchez (penalty scored); Nicolás Muñoz (penalty scored); Eliseo Quintanilla (penalty scored); Milton Molina (penalty scored) | 5–4 | (penalty scored) Christian Castillo; (penalty missed) Arturo Albarrán; (penalty scored) Danny Torres; (penalty scored) Emerson Véliz; (penalty scored) Odir Flores; (penalty missed) Miguel Montes |

Estadio Cuscatlán, San Salvador
Attendance: 20,359
Referee: Joel Aguilar

Isidro Metapán:
| GK | 24 | (El Salvador) Fidel Mondragón |
| DF | 8 | (El Salvador) Luis Perla | (yellow card) 13' (substituted off) 90' |
| DF | 2 | (El Salvador) Milton Molina |
| DF | 5 | (Honduras) Ernesto Aquino |
| DF | 15 | (El Salvador) Alfredo Pacheco |
| MF | 10 | (El Salvador) Paolo Suárez | (yellow card) 69' |
| MF | 20 | (El Salvador) Héctor Mejía | (yellow card) 90' |
| MF | 16 | (El Salvador) Ramón Sánchez | (yellow card) 56' |
| MF | 41 | (El Salvador) José Peraza | (substituted off) 46' |
| FW | 11 | (El Salvador) Christian Bautista | (substituted off) 73' |
| FW | 22 | (Panama) Nicolás Muñoz | 106' |
Substitutes:
| MF | 14 | (El Salvador) Eliseo Quintanilla | (substituted on) 46' |
| FW | 9 | (Uruguay) Jorge Ramírez | (substituted on) 73' |
| FW | 6 | (El Salvador) Julio Martínez | (substituted on) 90' |
Manager:
(El Salvador) Edwin Portillo

Alianza:
| GK | 1 | (El Salvador) Miguel Montes |
| DF | 15 | (El Salvador) Danny Torres | (yellow card) 38' |
| DF | 21 | (El Salvador) Jonathan Barrios | (yellow card) 66' (yellow-red card) 90' |
| DF | 6 | (El Salvador) Ramón Martínez |
| DF | 4 | (El Salvador) Carlos Arévalo |
| MF | 7 | (El Salvador) Rudy Valencia |
| MF | 16 | (El Salvador) Roberto Maradiaga | (substituted off) 21' |
| MF | 13 | (El Salvador) Elman Rivas | (yellow card) 39' (substituted off) 72' |
| MF | 12 | (El Salvador) Christian Castillo |
| FW | 22 | (El Salvador) Rodolfo Zelaya | (substituted off) 97' |
| FW | 9 | (Jamaica) Sean Fraser | (yellow card) 32' (goal) 110' |
Substitutes:
| MF | 20 | (El Salvador) Arturo Albarrán | (substituted on) 21' |
| MF | 26 | (El Salvador) Emerson Véliz | (substituted on) 72' |
| MF | 10 | (El Salvador) Josué Flores | (substituted on) 97' (yellow card) 105' |
Manager:
(Argentina) Ramiro Cepeda

Apertura 2012 champions

7th title

== Player statistics ==
=== Top scorers ===
| Rank | Scorer | Club | Goals |
|---|---|---|---|
| 1 | (Panama) Nicolás Muñoz | Isidro Metapán | 12 |
| 1 | (Jamaica) Sean Fraser | Alianza | 12 |
| 3 | (El Salvador) César Larios | UES | 9 |
| 4 | (El Salvador) Nelson Bonilla | Alianza | 7 |
| 4 | (Panama) Anel Canales | Luis Ángel Firpo | 7 |
| 6 | (Uruguay) Juan Carlos Reyes | Juventud Independiente | 6 |
| 6 | (El Salvador) Osael Romero | Águila | 6 |
| 6 | (El Salvador) Ricardo Ulloa | FAS | 6 |
| 6 | (Uruguay) Jorge Ramírez | Isidro Metapán | 6 |
| 6 | (El Salvador) Jonathan Águila | FAS | 6 |

Updated to games played on 25 November 2012.
Post-season goals are not included, only regular season goals.

=== Assists table ===
| Rank | Player | Club | Assists |
|---|---|---|---|
| 1 | (El Salvador) Ramón Sánchez | Isidro Metapán | 5 |
| 1 | (El Salvador) Osael Romero | Águila | 5 |
| 1 | (El Salvador) Ramiro Carballo | UES | 5 |
| 1 | (El Salvador) Cristian Castillo | Alianza | 5 |
| 1 | (El Salvador) Eliseo Quintanilla | Isidro Metapán | 5 |
| 6 | (Jamaica) Sean Fraser | Alianza | 4 |
| 6 | (El Salvador) Odir Flores | Alianza | 4 |
| 6 | (Colombia) Camilo Mejia | Once Municipal | 4 |
| 6 | (El Salvador) William Maldonado | Santa Tecla | 4 |
| 6 | (El Salvador) Ramón Flores | FAS | 4 |
| 6 | (El Salvador) Isidro Gutiérrez | Águila | 4 |
| 6 | (El Salvador) Darwin Bonilla | Águila | 4 |
| 6 | (El Salvador) Víctor Merino | Atlético Marte | 4 |
| 6 | (El Salvador) Alexander Larín | FAS | 4 |

=== Goalkeepers ===
| Goalkeeper | Goals | Matches | Average | Team |
|---|---|---|---|---|
| (El Salvador) Luis Contreras | 10 | 14 | 0.71 | FAS |
| (El Salvador) Miguel Montes | 16 | 17 | 0.94 | Alianza |
| (El Salvador) Benji Villalobos | 16 | 15 | 1.07 | Águila |
| (El Salvador) Javier Gómez | 19 | 14 | 1.36 | Atlético Marte |
| (El Salvador) Fidel Mondragón | 25 | 17 | 1.47 | Isidro Metapán |
| (United States) (El Salvador) Derby Carrillo | 23 | 15 | 1.53 | Santa Tecla |
| (El Salvador) Dagoberto Portillo | 19 | 12 | 1.58 | Luis Ángel Firpo |
| (El Salvador) Juan José Gómez | 19 | 12 | 1.58 | UES |
| (El Salvador) Jassir Deras | 19 | 12 | 1.58 | Juventud Independiente |
| (El Salvador) Julio Martínez | 27 | 10 | 2.70 | Once Municipal |

=== Bookings ===
| Rank | Team | Yellow card | Red card | Total |
|---|---|---|---|---|
| 1 | L.Á. Firpo | 42 | 2 | 44 |
| 1 | Once Municipal | 41 | 3 | 44 |
| 3 | FAS | 45 | 3 | 48 |
| 3 | Alianza | 45 | 3 | 48 |
| 5 | Águila | 48 | 1 | 49 |
| 5 | Santa Tecla | 45 | 4 | 49 |
| 7 | Isidro Metapán | 48 | 4 | 52 |
| 8 | Juventud Independiente | 47 | 9 | 56 |
| 8 | UES | 55 | 1 | 56 |
| 10 | Atlético Marte | 64 | 4 | 68 |
| | Total | 480 | 33 | 513 |

=== Hat-tricks ===
| Player | For | Against | Result | Date |
|---|---|---|---|---|
| (Panama) Anel Canales | Luis Ángel Firpo | Once Municipal | 1–3 | November 12, 2012 |

=== Individual awards ===
| Hombre GOL | Best Coach Award | Best Goalkeeper Award | Fair Player Award | Rookie Player Award |
|---|---|---|---|---|
| (Panama) Nicolás Muñoz; Isidro Metapán (Jamaica) Sean Fraser; Alianza | (El Salvador) Edwin Portillo; Isidro Metapán | (El Salvador) Luis Contreras; FAS | (El Salvador) César Larios; Atlético Marte | (El Salvador) Melvin Orantes; Once Municipal |

=== Season statistics ===
==== Scoring ====
- First goal of the season: (El Salvador) William Bonilla for Santa Tecla against Isidro Metapán, 2 minutes (14 July 2012)
- Fastest goal in a match: 25 seconds – (El Salvador) Hugo Montes for Atlético Marte against Once Municipal (7 November 2012)
- Goal scored at the latest point in a match: 90+4, (El Salvador) Benji Villalobos for Águila against Isidro Metapán (15 September 2012)
- First penalty Kick of the season: (Argentina) Carlos Escudero for Santa Tecla against Isidro Metapán, 74 minutes (14 July 2012)
- Widest winning margin: 6 goals
  - Alianza 7–1 Santa Tecla (22 July 2012)
- First hat-trick of the season: (Panama) Anel Canales for Luis Ángel Firpo against Once Municipal (12 November 2012)
- First own goal of the season: (El Salvador) Juan Granados (Independiente) for FAS (21 October 2012)
- Most goals by one team in a match: 7 Goals
  - Alianza 7–1 Santa Tecla (22 July 2012)
- Most goals in one half by one team: 5 Goals
  - Alianza 7–1 Santa Tecla (22 July 2012)
- Most goals scored by losing team: 3 Goals
  - Juventud Independiente 4–3 Atlético Marte (5 August 2012)
- Most goals by one player in a single match: 3 Goals
  - (Panama) Anel Canales for Luis Ángel Firpo against Once Municipal (12 November 2012)

==== Discipline ====
- First yellow card of the season: (El Salvador) Fabricio Alfaro for Santa Tecla against Isidro Metapán, 37 minutes (14 July 2012)
- First red card of the season: (El Salvador) José Alvarado for Isidro Metapán against Santa Tecla, 72 minutes (14 July 2012)
- Card given at latest point in a game:Yellow (El Salvador) Dennis Alas for Luis Ángel Firpo against Isidro Metapán, 90+4 minutes (4 August 2012)

== List of foreign players in the league ==
This is a list of foreign players in Apertura 2012. The following players:

1. have played at least one apertura game for the respective club.
2. have not been capped for the El Salvador national football team on any level, independently from the birthplace

A new rule was introduced a few season ago, that clubs can only have three foreign players per club and can only add a new player if there is an injury or player/s is released.

C.D. Águila

- (Cuba) Yaikel Pérez
- (Brazil) Ricardo de Lima

Alianza F.C.

- (Jamaica) Sean Fraser
- (Argentina) Diego Passarelli
- (Uruguay) Christian Vaquero

Atlético Marte

- (Argentina) Daniel Ruiz
- (Jamaica) Garrick Gordon
- (Colombia) Cristian Gil Mosquera

Juventud Independiente

- (Uruguay) Juan Carlos Reyes
- (Argentina) Maximiliano Alexis Villega
- (Costa Rica) Jeremy Araya

C.D. FAS

- (Argentina) Alejandro Bentos
- (Brazil) Emerson Reis Luiz
- (Colombia) Mario Alberto Abadía

(player released mid season)

C.D. Luis Ángel Firpo

- (Panama) Anel Canales
- (Colombia) Luis Torres
- (Ghana) James Owusu-Ansah

A.D. Isidro Metapán

- (Honduras) Ernesto Aquino
- (Uruguay) Jorge Ramírez

Once Municipal

- (Colombia) Juan Camilo Mejía
- (Brazil) Lucas Marcal
- (Brazil) Glauber Da Silva
- (Brazil) Daniel Cruz

Santa Tecla F.C.

- (Argentina) Carlos Escudero
- (Argentina) Lucas Rocco
- (Argentina) Facundo Nicolás Simioli

UES

- (Costa Rica) Gustavo Peña
- (Costa Rica) Allan Duarte
