= Glaúber da Silva =

Brazilian footballer (born 1981)

Personal information
- Full name: Glaúber Alceu da Silva
- Date of birth: October 1, 1981 (age 45)
- Place of birth: Cascavel, Brazil
- Position: Defender

Youth career
- 1998: Cascavel

Senior career*
Years	Team	Apps	(Gls)
1999–2000	CTE Colatina		
2001	América Futebol Clube (SP)		
2002	Cascavel		
2003–2004	Espírito Santo		
2005	Serra		
2006	Santa Cruz		
2006–2007	Vila Meã		
2007–2009	Torre de Moncorvo		
2010–2011	Atlético Marte		
2011–2012	C.D. Águila		
2012	Once Municipal		
2012	Halcones FC		
2013–2014	Istiklol	21	(1)
2014–2015	C.D. Pasaquina	28	(0)
- * Club domestic league appearances and goals

Glaúber Alceu da Silva (born October 1, 1981) is a former Brazilian professional footballer.

== Club career ==
=== Atlético Marte ===
Da Silva signed with Atlético Marte of the Salvadoran Primera División in 2010.

=== Águila ===
Da Silva signed with Águila in 2011. With the team of San Miguel, Da Silva won the Clausura 2012 final against Isidro Metapán (2–1 victory), on 6 May 2012. In that final, he got injured and was replaced by Henry Romero.

=== Once Municipal ===
Da Silva signed with Once Municipal for the Apertura 2012. Once Municipal finished in the tenth position of the league table with only 5 points.

=== Halcones FC ===
After leaving Once Municipal, Da Silva signed with Halcones FC of Guatemala.

=== Istiklol ===
In June 2013, Glaúber joined Istiklol in Tajikistan.

=== Pasaquina ===
Da Silva signed with Pasaquina for the Clausura 2015. With the team of La Union, Da Silva played 28 games.

== Honours ==
=== Club ===
FC Istiklol

- Tajik Cup (1): 2013

C.D. Águila

- Primera División
  - Champion: Clausura 2012
