= Juan Sosa =

Juan Sosa may refer to:

- Juan Sosa (baseball) (born 1975), Dominican baseball player
- Juan Ángel Sosa (born 1982), Argentine football forward
- Juan Sosa (footballer) (born 1985), Argentine football midfielder
