= Danny Torres =

Salvadoran footballer (born 1987)

Personal information
- Full name: Danny Vladimir Torres Angel
- Date of birth: November 7, 1987 (age 38)
- Place of birth: San Salvador, El Salvador
- Height: 1.69 m (5 ft 7 in)
- Position: Defender

Youth career
- 1999–2004: Escuelas de fútbol de Baygon

Senior career*
Years	Team	Apps	(Gls)
2005–2012	Atlético Marte		
2012–2017	Alianza	194	(5)
2017–2018	Sonsonate	44	(4)

International career
2014–	El Salvador		
- * Club domestic league appearances and goals

Danny Vladimir Torres Angel (born November 7, 1987, in San Salvador, El Salvador) is a Salvadoran professional footballer.

== Club career ==
=== Atlético Marte ===
Torres signed with Atlético Marte in 2005. With Torres, Atlético Marte return to the Primera División in the Apertura 2009.

Torres left the club after the Clausura 2012 ended.

=== Alianza ===
Torres signed with Alianza for the Apertura 2012. In his first tournament with Alianza, he reached the final of the Apertura 2012. Alianza finished in second place with 34 points. However, Alianza lost the final against Isidro Metapán on penalties in the Estadio Cuscatlán.

In the next tournament, the Clausura 2013, Alianza reached the semi-finals but was eliminated by Luis Ángel Firpo.

With Alianza, Torres won the Apertura 2015 final against FAS (1–0 victory).

Alianza reached a new final in the Clausura 2017, but lost against Santa Tecla (0–4 defeat). Torres started in the game. He left the club after that final.

=== Sonsonate ===
Torres signed with Sonsonate for the Apertura 2017 tournament. In September 2017, Torres was honored in a match against Isidro Metapán for its 300 matches in Primera División.

With Sonsonate, Torres reached the semi-finals of the Apertura 2016, but they were eliminated by Alianza 0–4 on aggregate.

In the Clausura 2018, Sonsonate fought to not descend and disputed an extra game to decide the team that would play in Segunda División against Dragón, a match that was played in the Estadio Cuscatlán and that Sonsonate won 3–2.

Torres left the team before the start of the Apertura 2018. However, with Sonsonate he lived arrears in salary payments.

== Honours ==
=== Alianza ===
- Primera División (1): Apertura 2015
