= Cristián Bautista =

Salvadoran footballer (born 1987)

Personal information
- Full name: Cristián Javier Bautista
- Date of birth: December 10, 1987 (age 38)
- Place of birth: La Unión, El Salvador
- Height: 1.68 m (5 ft 6 in)
- Position: Striker

Youth career
- 2002–2003: Deportivo Amatitlán
- 2003–2005: Atlético Balboa

Senior career*
Years	Team	Apps	(Gls)
2005–2006	Atlético Balboa		
2006–2007	Once Municipal		
2007–2009	CD Águila		
2009–2010	Atlético Balboa		
2010–2013	AD Isidro Metapán		
2013	→ Deportivo Mictlán (loan)		
2014	CD Luis Ángel Firpo		
2014–2015	CD Águila		
2016	CD Chalatenango		
2017	CD Dragón		
2018–2019	CD Pasaquina		
2019	CD El Vencedor		

International career
2006	El Salvador U-21		
2011–	El Salvador	7	(2)
- * Club domestic league appearances and goals

Cristián Javier Bautista (born December 10, 1987, in La Unión) is a Salvadoran professional footballer, who plays as a striker.

== Club career ==
=== Atlético Balboa ===
Bautista started his professional career at his hometown club, Atlético Balboa in 2005.

=== Once Municipal ===
He then had spell at Once Municipal in 2006.

=== Águila ===
He signed with Águila in 2007.

=== Return to Atlético Balboa ===
Bautista signed again with Atlético Balboa in 2010.

== International career ==
Bautista debuted with El Salvador on February 9, 2011.

He could only play the few last minutes of the friendly match against Haiti, at the Estadio Cuscatlán.

He scored his first international goal against the Dominican Republic in a 2014 FIFA World Cup qualification match and played the full 90 minutes.

=== International goals ===
#	Date	Venue	Opponent	Score	Result	Competition
1	2 September 2011	Estadio Cuscatlán, San Salvador, El Salvador	Dominican Republic	2–0	3–2	2014 FIFA World Cup qualification
2	6 September 2011	Truman Bodden Stadium, George Town, Cayman Islands	Cayman Islands	0–1	1–4	2014 FIFA World Cup qualification

== Honours ==
=== Club ===
Once Municipal

- Primera División
  - Champion: Apertura 2006

A.D. Isidro Metapán

- Primera División
  - Champion: Apertura 2011, Apertura 2012
  - Runners-up: Clausura 2012

C.D. Águila

- Primera División
  - Runners-up: Apertura 2014
