= Ramón Ávila =

Chilean footballer (born 1982)

Personal information
- Full name: Ramón Patricio Ávila Castro
- Date of birth: February 20, 1982 (age 44)
- Place of birth: Villa Alegre, Chile
- Height: 1.79 m (5 ft 10 in)
- Position: Forward

Youth career
- 1996–2001: Colo-Colo
- 2001: Rangers

Senior career*
Years	Team	Apps	(Gls)
2001–2011	Rangers	124	(20)
2008–2009	Luis Ángel Firpo	8	(4)
2010	Rangers	12	(1)
Total		144	(25)
- * Club domestic league appearances and goals

Ramón Patricio Ávila Castro (born February 20, 1982) is a Chilean former professional footballer who played as a forward for clubs in Chile and El Salvador.

== Career ==
Born in Villa Alegre, Chile, Ávila played in the Colo Colo youth teams before joining Rangers de Talca in 2001.

He spent the most part of his career with Rangers, with a stint in El Salvador, where he played for Luis Ángel Firpo and won the league title in 2008. He retired in 2010 while he played for Rangers in the Primera B de Chile.

== Personal life ==
In December 2021, he had a heart attack when he was a player of the amateur club 8 1/2 from Talca.

== Honours ==
Luis Ángel Firpo

- Salvadoran Primera División: 2008 Clausura
