= Matías Cresseri =

Uruguayan footballer (born 1980)

Personal information
- Full name: Matías Cresseri Valerio
- Date of birth: 15 February 1980 (age 46)
- Place of birth: Montevideo, Uruguay
- Height: 1.78 m (5 ft 10 in)
- Position: Midfielder

Senior career*
Years	Team	Apps	(Gls)
1999–2003	River Plate	0	(0)
2004	El Tanque Sisley	15	(1)
2005–2007	Central Español	70	(13)
2007–2008	Danubio	13	(0)
2009–2010	Bella Vista	9	(1)
2010	Aragua	11	(0)
2011	Águila	?	(?)
2011–2012	Plaza Colonia	10	(1)
- * Club domestic league appearances and goals as of July 24, 2012

Matías Cresseri Valerio (born 15 February 1980) is a Uruguayan former footballer who last played for Plaza Colonia in the Uruguayan Segunda División.

== Career ==
Cresseri began his career playing with River Plate Montevideo in 1999.

In his career, he has also played in the first division of his country, with El Tanque Sisley, Central Español, Danubio and Bella Vista.

In July 2010, he was transferred to Primera División Venezolana side Aragua FC.

In January 2011, he signed a new deal with Salvadoran side Club Deportivo Águila.
