= Francisco Ladogano =

Argentine footballer

Personal information
- Full name: Francisco Ezequiel Ladogana
- Date of birth: 12 August 1988 (age 38)
- Place of birth: La Plata, Argentina
- Height: 1.77 m (5 ft 10 in)
- Position: Midfielder

Team information
- Current team: Cobán Imperial

Senior career*
Years	Team	Apps	(Gls)
2005–2007	Defensores de Cambaceres		
2008	San Telmo		
2008	Sarmiento de Junín		
2009	Defensores Unidos		
2010	Defensores de Cambaceres		
2011	Club Atlético Argentino		
2012	Deportivo Pereira	16	(1)
2013–2014	Club Sol de América		
2014–2015	UES		
2015–2016	Suchitepéquez	19	(4)
- * Club domestic league appearances and goals as of April 15, 2017

Francisco Ezequiel Ladogana (born August 12, 1988, in La Plata) is an Argentinian footballer who plays as a midfielder.
