= Matías Coloca =

Argentine footballer

Personal information
- Full name: Matías Nahuel Coloca Lavandeira
- Date of birth: 11 September 1985 (age 41)
- Place of birth: Buenos Aires, Argentina
- Height: 1.75 m (5 ft 9 in)
- Position: Goalkeeper

Team information
- Current team: Real Destroyer

Senior career*
Years	Team	Apps	(Gls)
2005–2006	San Lorenzo	0	(0)
2006–2007	La Plata	3	(0)
2007–2009	Deportivo Español	23	(0)
2009–2011	Almagro	16	(0)
2011–2013	Villa San Carlos	49	(0)
2014	Altamira	10	(0)
2014–2015	Sportivo Las Parejas	30	(0)
2016	Deportivo Armenio	0	(0)
2016	Deportivo Achirense	10	(0)
2017–2019	FAS	89	(0)
2019	Atlético Marte		
2020	Independiente	11	(0)
2020	Luis Ángel Firpo	17	(0)
2021	Atlético Marte	20	(0)
2022–	Real Destroyer		
- * Club domestic league appearances and goals as of 19:49, 15 August 2022 (UTC)

Matías Nahuel Coloca Lavandeira (born 11 September 1985) is an Argentine footballer who plays as a goalkeeper for Salvadoran club Real Destroyer.

== Career ==
Coloca started his senior career with San Lorenzo de Almagro. In 2007, he signed for Deportivo Español in the Argentinean Primera B Metropolitana, where he made twenty-three league appearances and scored zero goals. After that, he played for Club Almagro, Club Atlético Villa San Carlos, Cafetaleros de Chiapas, Sportivo Las Parejas, Deportivo Armenio, Deportivo Achirense, C.D. FAS, C.D. Atlético Marte, Independiente, and C.D. Luis Ángel Firpo, where he now plays.
