= Matías Milozzi =

Argentine footballer (born 1978)

Matías Horacio Milozzi (born 20 October 1978, in Quilmes, Buenos Aires, Argentina) is an Argentine former professional footballer who played as a forward for clubs in Argentina, El Salvador, Italy, Peru, Spain and Venezuela.

== Teams ==
- (Argentina) Quilmes 1999–2001
- (Argentina) Arsenal de Sarandí 2001
- (Argentina) Quilmes 2002
- (Venezuela) Trujillanos 2002
- (Venezuela) Unión Atlético Maracaibo 2003
- (Chile) Rangers 2004
- (Venezuela) Deportivo Italchacao 2005
- (Peru) Melgar 2005
- (El Salvador) Once Municipal 2006
- (Spain) Comarca Nijar 2006–2007
- (Italy) Brindisi 2007–2008
- (Italy) Fasano 2008–2009
- (Italy) Fondi 2009
- (Italy) Formia 2010
- (Italy) Olympia Agnonese 2010–2011
- (Italy) Aquanera 2011–2013
- (Argentina) Club Atlético Independiente de Chivilcoy 2013–2017
- (Argentina) Club Colon DE Chivilcoy 2017
- (Argentina) Club Atlético Gimnasia de Chivilcoy 2017-2019
