= José Denis Conde =

Uruguayan footballer (born 1971)

Personal information
- Date of birth: 2 January 1971 (age 55)
- Place of birth: Montevideo, Uruguay
- Height: 1.70 m (5 ft 7 in)
- Position: Midfielder

Senior career*
| Years | Team | Apps | (Gls) |
| 1989–1991 | Defensor Sporting | | |
| 1992–1993 | Huracán Buceo | | |
| 1994 | Club Sportivo Cerrito | | |
| 1995 | Rampla Juniors | | |
| 1995–1997 | Nueva Chicago | 43 | (12) |
| 1997 | Sportivo Italiano | 19 | (3) |
| 1997–1998 | Chacarita Juniors | 44 | (11) |
| 1998–1999 | Deportivo Español | 16 | (3) |
| 2000 | Racingde Montevideo | 15 | (2) |
| 2000 | Provincial Osorno | | |
| 2001 | Blooming | | |
| 2001 | Rentistas | 12 | (1) |
| 2002 | Alianza | 24 | (10) |
| 2003–2004 | CSD Villa Española | 5 | (0) |
| 2004 | Alianza | | |
| 2004–2005 | Cobán Imperial | 6 | (1) |
| 2006 | Uruguay Montevideo | 6 | (0) |
| 2007 | CSD Villa Española | | |
- * Club domestic league appearances and goals

José Denis Conde (born January 2, 1971, in Montevideo, Uruguay) is a former Uruguayan footballer who played for clubs of Uruguay, Argentina, Chile, Bolivia, El Salvador and Guatemala.

== Teams ==
- (Uruguay) Defensor Sporting 1989–1991
- (Uruguay) Huracán Buceo 1992–1993
- (Uruguay) Sportivo Cerrito 1994
- (Uruguay) Rampla Juniors 1995
- (Argentina) Nueva Chicago 1995–1997
- (Argentina) Sportivo Italiano 1997
- (Argentina) Chacarita Juniors 1997–1998
- (Argentina) Deportivo Español 1998–1999
- (Uruguay) Racing de Montevideo 2000
- (Chile) Provincial Osorno 2000
- (Bolivia) Blooming 2001
- (Uruguay) Rentistas 2001
- (Uruguay) Alianza 2002
- (Uruguay) Villa Española 2003–2004
- (El Salvador) Alianza 2004
- (Guatemala) Coban Imperial 2004–2005
- Uruguay Montevideo 2006
- (Uruguay) Villa Española 2007
