= Óscar Maturín =

Mexican footballer (born 1979)

Oscar Maturin
Personal information
- Full name: Oscar Natalio Maturin Landeros
- Date of birth: 30 June 1979 (age 47)
- Place of birth: Culiacán, Sinaloa, Mexico
- Height: 1.89 m (6 ft 2 in)
- Position: Centre back

Senior career*
Years	Team	Apps	(Gls)
2001–2004	Atlante	62	(2)
2005	Pioneros de Ciudad Obregon		
2005–2006	Tampico Madero		
2006–2007	Pegaso Real de Colima	12	(0)
2007	Nejapa		
- * Club domestic league appearances and goals

Oscar Natalio Maturin Landeros (born 30 June 1979) is a Mexican footballer.
