= Alyson Batista =

Brazilian footballer (born 1981)

Personal information
- Full name: Alyson Batista Brandão
- Date of birth: June 21, 1981 (age 45)
- Place of birth: Campina Grande, Brazil
- Position: Forward

Senior career*
Years	Team	Apps	(Gls)
2000–2005	Nacional Atlético Clube (Patos)		
2005	Atlético Clube Coríntians		
2006	Potyguar Seridoense		
2007–2008	Nacional Atlético Clube (Patos)		
2009	Águila		
2010	Xinabajul		
2010–2011	Juventud Independiente		
2012	Campo Grande Atlético Clube		
2013	Iranduba		
- * Club domestic league appearances and goals

Alyson Batista Brandão (born June 21, 1981), also known as Alyson Batista, is a Brazilian footballer currently playing football for Juventud Independiente.
