= Rodolfo Córdoba =

Colombian footballer (born 1984)

Personal information
- Full name: Rodolfo Córdoba Correa
- Date of birth: January 14, 1984 (age 42)
- Place of birth: Cali, Colombia
- Height: 1.76 m (5 ft 9 in)
- Position: Midfielder

Team information
- Current team: C.D. FAS

Youth career
- 1999: América de Cali (C)
- 2000–2003: América de Cali (B)

Senior career*
Years	Team	Apps	(Gls)
2004	América de Cali		
2005–2008	Deportes Quindío		
2009	América de Cali		
2009	Centauros Villavicencio		
2010	Chorrillo		
2010	FAS		
2011	Estudiantes de Mérida		
- * Club domestic league appearances and goals

Rodolfo Córdoba Correa (born January 14, 1984) is a Colombian footballer who last played for Estudiantes de Mérida of Venezuela.
