= Pablo Quandt =

Colombian footballer (born 1985)

Personal information
- Full name: Pablo Arturo Quandt Cordoba
- Date of birth: May 14, 1985 (age 41)
- Place of birth: Santa Marta, Colombia

Senior career*
Years	Team	Apps	(Gls)
2004–2008	Unión Magdalena		
2009	Patriotas		
2010	Unión Magdalena		
2010	FAS		
2011	Unión Magdalena		
2011–	River Plate Aruba		
- * Club domestic league appearances and goals

Pablo Arturo Quandt Cordoba (born May 14, 1985) is a Colombian footballer.
