= Henry Romero (footballer, born 1991) =

Salvadoran footballer (born 1991)

Personal information
- Full name: Henry Javier Romero Ventura
- Date of birth: 17 September 1991 (age 35)
- Place of birth: Santa Rosa de Lima, El Salvador
- Height: 1.76 m (5 ft 9 in)
- Position: Defender

Team information
- Current team: Alianza
- Number: 16

Youth career
- 2008–2009: Águila (reserves)

Senior career*
Years	Team	Apps	(Gls)
2010–2017	Águila	203	(13)
2017–	Alianza	302	(20)

International career^{‡}
2014–	El Salvador	26	(1)
- * Club domestic league appearances and goals as of 20:00, 24 May 2025 (UTC) ‡ National team caps and goals as of 20:00, 31 May 2025 (UTC)

Henry Javier Romero Ventura (born 17 September 1991) is a Salvadoran professional footballer who plays as a defender for Primera División club Alianza and the El Salvador national team.

== Club career ==
Romero signed with Alianza for the Apertura 2017 tournament. On 14 September 2017, he scored his first goal for Alianza in a 4–0 win against Municipal Limeño at the Estadio Cuscatlán.

On 8 December 2018, Romero was sent off in the second leg of the semifinals of the Apertura 2018, a 2–2 draw against FAS. However, Alianza reached its fifth consecutive final since the Apertura 2016.

== International career ==
Romero is the son of former Honduran football player Reinerio Medina who played for Municipal Limeno is 1990–1991 season, which allowed him to be able to represent Honduras or El Salvador During a 2017 CONCACAF Gold Cup match against the United States, Romero bit Jozy Altidore and was suspended for six matches.

== Career statistics ==
Scores and results list El Salvador's goal tally first.

Goal	Date	Venue	Opponent	Score	Result	Competition
1.	17 January 2017	Estadio Rommel Fernández, Panama City, Panama	Belize	3–0	3–1	2017 Copa Centroamericana

== Honours ==
Águila

- Primera División: Clausura 2012; runner-up Apertura 2014, Clausura 2016

Alianza

- Primera División: Apertura 2017, Clausura 2018; runner-up Clausura 2017, Apertura 2018
