= Jairo Araujo =

Mexican footballer (born 1990)

Jairo Araújo
Personal information
- Full name: Jairo Israel Araújo Cano
- Date of birth: 25 February 1990 (age 36)
- Place of birth: San Francisco del Rincón, Guanajuato, Mexico
- Height: 1.80 m (5 ft 11 in)
- Position: Midfielder

Team information
- Current team: Cimarrones de Sonora
- Number: 43

Senior career*
| Years | Team | Apps | (Gls) |
| 2008–2009 | Lobos de Tlaxcala | | |
| 2010–2011 | Club León | | |
| 2011–2012 | Irapuato 'B' | | |
| 2012– 2013 | Alianza | 18 | (3) |
| 2015–2019 | Cimarrones de Sonora | 39 | (0) |
- * Club domestic league appearances and goals

Jairo Israel Araújo Cano (born February 25, 1990) is a Mexican footballer. He currently plays for Cimarrones de Sonora of Mexico.
