= Rubén Quijada =

Salvadoran footballer (born 1985)

Personal information
- Full name: Rubén Adolfo Quijada Umanzor
- Date of birth: December 18, 1985 (age 40)
- Place of birth: San Salvador, El Salvador
- Height: 1.68 m (5 ft 6 in)
- Position: Midfielder

Youth career
- Pericos del Externado

Senior career*
Years	Team	Apps	(Gls)
- UCA
2006–2010	Luis Ángel Firpo	61	(3)

International career^{‡}
2008	El Salvador	1	(0)
- * Club domestic league appearances and goals ‡ National team caps and goals as of 00:00, 11 December 2021 (UTC)

Rubén Adolfo Quijada Umanzor (born December 18, 1985) is a Salvadoran football player.

== Club career ==
Quijada started playing football at 14 with youth team Pericos del Externado San José and played for UCA before joining Luis Ángel Firpo in 2006. In May 2010 he was released by Firpo.

== International career ==
Quijada was called up twice for El Salvador but never played an official international match.
