= Juan Ángel Sosa =

Paraguayan footballer (born 1982)

Personal information
- Full name: Juan Ángel Sosa Ortigoza
- Date of birth: 5 November 1982 (age 44)
- Place of birth: Asunción, Paraguay
- Height: 1.70 m (5 ft 7 in)
- Position: Forward

Senior career*
Years	Team	Apps	(Gls)
2001–2005	Libertad		
2006	Suwon Bluewings		
2007	Rio Branco de Andradas		
2008–2011	Independiente FBC		
2011	Atlético Marte		
2012–2013	Resistencia SC		
- * Club domestic league appearances and goals as of 18 August 2011

Juan Ángel Sosa (born 5 November 1982) is a Paraguayan football forward who most recently played for Atlético Marte of the Primera División de Fútbol de El Salvador.

== Club career ==
In August 2011 Sosa joined Atlético Marte, but suddenly left them during the 2011 Apertura season.
