= Darwin Bonilla =

Salvadoran footballer (born 1990)

Personal information
- Full name: Darwin Doronis Bonilla Salgado
- Date of birth: August 6, 1990 (age 36)
- Place of birth: Chirilagua, El Salvador
- Height: 1.74 m (5 ft 9 in)
- Position: Striker

Team information
- Current team: Águila
- Number: 24

Youth career
- 2002–2005: Dragón
- 2006–2007: Águila

Senior career*
Years	Team	Apps	(Gls)
2008–2013	Águila		

International career
2011	El Salvador U23	1	(0)
2013	El Salvador	5	(0)
- * Club domestic league appearances and goals

Darwin Doronis Bonilla Salgado (born August 6, 1990 in Chirilagua, El Salvador) is a former Salvadoran footballer. He was banned for life in 2013, for match-fixing while playing for the El Salvador national football team.

== Club career ==
Bonilla's professional career began in July 2008 when he signed a contract with Salvadoran national league club, C.D. Águila, after he had already joined them 2 years earlier from Dragón.

He made his professional debut on September 13, 2008, in a league match against C.D. Vista Hermosa, and scored his first goal on November 5 that same year in a league match against C.D. Luis Ángel Firpo.

On September 20, 2013, Bonilla was one of 14 members of the country's national team banned for life for match fixing.

== Career statistics ==
=== Club ===
As of December 25, 2008.

Club	Season	League		League Cup		Continental		Other		Total	
Club	Season	Apps	Goals	Apps	Goals	Apps	Goals	Apps	Goals	Apps	Goals
C.D. Águila	Apertura 2008	5	1	–		0	0	0	0	5	1
Career total		5	1	–		0	0	0	0	5	1
