= Dimas (footballer, born 1987) =

Brazilian footballer

Personal information
- Full name: Dimas Braz Rimi de Oliveira
- Date of birth: April 29, 1987 (age 39)
- Place of birth: Ribeirão Preto, Brazil
- Height: 1.73 m (5 ft 8 in)
- Position: Striker

Team information
- Current team: Portuguesa Londrinense

Senior career*
Years	Team	Apps	(Gls)
2006	Portuguesa		
2007–2009	Portuguesa Londrinense		
2007–2008	→ Cetatea Suceava (loan)		
2008	→ Once Municipal (loan)	13	(4)
2009–2010	Once Municipal		
2010–2013	Portuguesa Londrinense		
- * Club domestic league appearances and goals

Dimas Braz Rimi de Oliveira (born April 29, 1987), best known as Dimas, is a Brazilian football striker, who plays for Portuguesa Londrinense in the Brazilian second division.
