= Ricardo Ulloa =

Salvadoran footballer (born 1990)

Personal information
- Full name: Ricardo Antonio Ulloa Alonzo
- Date of birth: 2 July 1990 (age 36)
- Place of birth: Metapán, El Salvador
- Height: 1.79 m (5 ft 10 1/2 in)
- Position: Forward

Senior career*
Years	Team	Apps	(Gls)
2010–2014	FAS		
2013	→ Spartaks Jūrmala (loan)	13	(3)
2014	Santa Tecla	12	(2)
2014–2016	Isidro Metapán	25	(4)
2016–2017	Sonsonate	39	(6)
2017	Chalatenango	10	(0)

International career^{‡}
2012–2013	El Salvador	4	(0)
- * Club domestic league appearances and goals ‡ National team caps and goals as of 6 February 2013

Ricardo Antonio Ulloa Alonzo (born 2 July 1990) is a retired Salvadoran professional footballer, who last played for Chalatenango in 2017.

== Club career ==
=== CD FAS ===
On 30 July 2010, Ulloa played his first game for FAS as an 86th minute sub against Xelajú, the match ended 1–1, then 2 days later he scored twice in a 2–2 draw with Vista Hermosa.

He scored against Águila on 7 November 2010 in a 3–1 away defeat. He scored in the 2–2 draw against Once Municipal on 6 March 2011. On 14 March 2012 he scored twice against UES in a 4–1 home win.

Ulloa then scored in his next 4 games starting with a 1–1 draw against Juventud Independiente (25 March 2012) against Firpo (2–2, 1 April).

He scored against Isidro Metapán on 22 April 2012 in a 2–0 home win.

=== Spartaks Jūrmala ===
On 1 July, Ricardo Ulloa was signed by the Latvian Higher League club Spartaks Jūrmala on a six-month loan deal.

Ulloa scored his first goal for the club on his debut in a 2–3 loss to FK Ventspils on 14 July 2013. His loan ended along with the season in November. Spartaks finished in 7th position of the league with Ulloa scoring three goals.

== International career ==
Ulloa made his international debut in a friendly match against New Zealand that ended in a 2–2 draw.

== Personal life ==
Ulloa is the son of former El Salvador national team player Óscar Lagarto Ulloa. His brother Óscar Ulloa was player of FAS.

== Club statistics ==
As of 27 May 2012

Club	Season	League		Cup		Total	
Club	Season	Apps	Goals	Apps	Goals	Apps	Goals
FAS	2011-12	10	8	0	0	10	8
FAS	2010-11	18	6	0	0	18	6
FAS	Total	28	14	0	0	28	14
