= Rómulo (footballer, born 1987) =

Brazilian footballer

Personal information
- Full name: Luís Rómulo de Castro
- Date of birth: 9 December 1987 (age 38)
- Place of birth: Brazil
- Position: Midfielder

Senior career*
Years	Team	Apps	(Gls)
2011	Goianésia	1	(0)
2010–2011	Águila	11	(0)
2011–2012	Tarxien Rainbows	21	(2)
2012	Dibba Al-Hisn Sports Club		
2013	Abahani limited		
2014	Al-Tali'aa SC		
- * Club domestic league appearances and goals

Luís Rómulo de Castro (born 9 December 1987), commonly known as Rómulo, is a Brazilian footballer.
