= Lucas Abraham =

Argentine footballer (born 1979)

Personal information
- Full name: Lucas Daniel Abraham López
- Date of birth: February 23, 1979 (age 47)
- Place of birth: Buenos Aires, Argentina
- Height: 1.78 m (5 ft 10 in)
- Position: Forward

Senior career*
Years	Team	Apps	(Gls)
1999–2000	All Boys	6	(0)
2000–2001	Alianza Lima		
2001	Maracaibo		
2002	Táchira		
2002	Zamora FC		
2003	Cúcuta Deportivo		
2004–2005	Nacional		
2005	Gimnasia y Tiro de Salta		
2006	C.D. FAS		
2006–2007	Alacranes		
2007	Carabobo		
2008	San Salvador F.C.		
2008–2009	Juventud Independiente		
2010–2011	Gimnasia y Tiro de Salta		
- * Club domestic league appearances and goals

Lucas Daniel Abraham López (born February 23, 1979) is a retired Argentine retired football forward.

Abraham started his career in the lower divisions of Argentine football with All Boys. He has gone on to play for a number of clubs across Latin America, spending much of his career to date playing in Venezuela.

Abraham had a brief return to Argentine football in 2005 when he played for Gimnasia y Tiro de Salta and then he came back to this team in 2010.
