= Leonardo Pekarnik =

Argentine footballer

Leonardo Pékarnik
Personal information
- Full name: Leonardo Gabriel Pékarnik
- Date of birth: August 4, 1981 (age 45)
- Place of birth: Buenos Aires, Argentina
- Height: 1.78 m (5 ft 10 in)
- Position: Midfielder

Senior career*
Years	Team	Apps	(Gls)
2000–2003	Independiente	29	(0)
2003–2004	Estudiantes	4	(0)
2004	Independiente	0	(0)
2005	Defensores de Belgrano	12	(2)
2005–2006	Universidad César Vallejo		
2007–2008	Luis Ángel Firpo		
2009	Envigado		
2009–2010	Sportivo Belgrano	24	(1)
2011–2012	San Telmo	24	(0)
- * Club domestic league appearances and goals

Leonardo Gabriel Pékarnik (born 4 August 1981) is an Argentine retired footballer.

== Club career ==
He started his career with Club Atlético Independiente in 2000. He was part of the squad that won the Apertura 2002 tournament. In 2003, he moved to Estudiantes de La Plata but returned to Independiente in 2004.

In 2005 Pékarnik joined Defensores de Belgrano in the Argentine 2nd division, he then moved to Peru where he played for Universidad César Vallejo until the end of 2006. In 2007, he joined C.D. Luis Ángel Firpo of El Salvador where he won two Championships.

In 2009, he joined Envigado FC of Colombia.

== Titles ==
Season	Team	Title
Apertura 2002	Independiente	Primera División Argentina
Clasura 2007	C.D. Luis Ángel Firpo	Primera División El Salvador
Apertura 2008	C.D. Luis Ángel Firpo	Primera División El Salvador
