= Alexander Lugo =

Colombian footballer (born 1979)

Personal information
- Full name: Alexander Lugo Morales
- Date of birth: 7 July 1979 (age 47)
- Place of birth: Cali, Colombia
- Height: 1.81 m (5 ft 11 in)
- Position: Forward

Youth career
- 1988–2000: Carlos Sarmiento

Senior career*
| Years | Team | Apps | (Gls) |
| 2000–2001 | Cooperamos | | |
| 2002–2003 | Deportes Tolima | | |
| 2003–2004 | Cortuluá | | |
| 2005–2007 | Academia | | |
| 2007–2008 | Chalatenango | | |
| 2008–2011 | Academia | | |
| 2011– | FC Alcarràs | | |
- * Club domestic league appearances and goals

Alexander Lugo (born July 7, 1979) is a Colombian footballer who plays for FC Alcarràs. He previously played for Deportes Tolima and Cortulua in Colombia and C.D. Chalatenango in El Salvador.
