= Rodolfo Rodríguez (Costa Rican footballer) =

Costa Rican footballer (born 1980)

Personal information
- Full name: Rodolfo Rodríguez Mojica
- Date of birth: February 27, 1980 (age 46)
- Place of birth: San José, Costa Rica
- Height: 1.78 m (5 ft 10 in)
- Position: Defensive midfielder

Youth career
- Saprissa

Senior career*
Years	Team	Apps	(Gls)
1998–2004	Saprissa		
2000–2002	→ Municipal de Osa (loan)	17	(0)
2003–2004	→ Guanacasteca (loan)	0	(0)
2004–2005	Liberia Mía	28	(3)
2005–2007	Brujas	56	(3)
2007–2008	Haugesund	24	(3)
2008–2009	→ Brujas FC (loan)	35	(1)
2010	Tianjin Teda	19	(0)
2011	Orión	2	(1)
2012	FAS	15	(0)
2012	Santos de Guápiles	15	(0)
2013	Pérez Zeledón	21	(0)
2014–2015	Puma Generaleña	28	(0)

International career^{‡}
1997	Costa Rica U-17		
2007	Costa Rica	9	(0)
- * Club domestic league appearances and goals as of October 22, 2014 ‡ National team caps and goals as of October 22, 2014

Rodolfo Rodríguez Mojica (born 27 February 1980) is a retired Costa Rican professional football defensive midfielder.

== Club career ==
He began his professional career with Deportivo Saprissa and played for other national clubs, Norwegian First Division side FK Haugesund and Chinese club Tianjin Teda.

In August 2011, he left second division side Orión for reasons unknown, later joining Salvadoran giants FAS. He returned to Costa Rica in summer 2012 to play for Santos de Guápiles. In November 2013 he was dismissed by Pérez Zeledón.

In January 2014 he joined second division AS Puma Generaleña, with whom he won promotion to the top tier.

== International career ==
Rodríguez has made nine appearances for the senior Costa Rica national football team, his debut coming in a friendly against Trinidad & Tobago on February 4, 2007. He appeared in three matches as Costa Rica won the UNCAF Nations Cup 2007 tournament and one match at the 2007 CONCACAF Gold Cup.

Rodríguez played for Costa Rica at the 1997 FIFA U-17 World Cup in Egypt.
