= Hugo Sarmiento =

Honduran footballer (born 1978)

Personal information
- Full name: Hugo Mauricio Sarmiento Paz
- Date of birth: 25 April 1978 (age 48)
- Place of birth: San Pedro Sula, Honduras
- Position: Midfielder

Senior career*
Years	Team	Apps	(Gls)
1999–2000	San Luis F.C.		
2000	Isidro Metapán		
2003	Atlético Chaparratique		
2006–2007	Independiente Nacional		
2003, 2007–2008	Aspirante		
2008–2009	Atlético Balboa		
2009–2010	Topiltzín		
2010–2011	El Roble		
2012	Vista Hermosa		
- * Club domestic league appearances and goals

Hugo Mauricio Sarmiento Paz (born 25 April 1978) is a Honduran former professional footballer who played as a midfielder.
