= James Owusu-Ansah =

Ghanaian footballer (born 1981)

Personal information
- Full name: James Owusu-Ansah
- Date of birth: 2 December 1981 (age 44)
- Place of birth: Accra, Ghana
- Height: 1.68 m (5 ft 6 in)
- Position: Striker

Youth career
- 1988–1993: Envoys FC Kumasi
- 1994–1998: University of Cape Coast

Senior career*
| Years | Team | Apps | (Gls) |
| 1996–1997 | Liberty Professionals | | |
| 1997–1999 | Cruz Azul Hidalgo | | |
| 1999–2005 | Cruz Azul | | |
| 2002 | → Correcaminos (loan) | | |
| 2004 | → Chiapas (loan) | | |
| 2004–2005 | Aurora | | |
| 2005–2006 | Once Municipal | | |
| 2007 | Chapecoense | | |
| 2008 | Xelajú MC | | |
| 2009–2010 | Once Lobos | | |
| 2010–2012 | Atlético Marte | | |
| 2012–2013 | Luis Ángel Firpo | 15 | (1) |

International career
| 2001 | Ghana U20 | 4 | (0) |
- * Club domestic league appearances and goals

James Owusu-Ansah (born 2 December 1981) is a Ghanaian former professional footballer who played as a striker.

== Club career ==
In 2007, Owusu-Ansah was among 30 players selected by Chapecoense's manager Ribeiro. Midway through the following season, he left the club and moved to Guatemala to join Xelajú MC.

== International career ==
Owusu-Ansah played four matches for silver medal-winning Ghana U20 at the 2001 FIFA World Youth Championship.

== Honours ==
Ghana U20

- FIFA World Youth Championship runner-up: 2001
