= César Larios =

Salvadoran footballer (born 1988)

Personal information
- Full name: César Alexander Larios Flores
- Date of birth: April 21, 1988 (age 38)
- Place of birth: Santa Ana, El Salvador
- Height: 1.78 m (5 ft 10 in)
- Position: Forward

Youth career
- 2002–2003: Academia Cuscachapa

Senior career*
Years	Team	Apps	(Gls)
2003–2004	FAS B (Second Division)		
2005	FAS B (First team reserves)		
2005–2009	FAS		
2010–2011	Isidro Metapán		
2011–2012	UES		
2012–2013	Atlético Marte		
2013–2014	Águila	29	(3)
2014–2015	Once Lobos		
2015–2016	Juventud Independiente		
2016	Leones de Occidente		
2016–2017	Once Municipal		
2017–2019	San Pablo Municipal		

International career
- El Salvador U17
- El Salvador U20
2006–2009	El Salvador	9	(1)
- * Club domestic league appearances and goals

César Alexander Larios Flores (born April 21, 1988) is a Salvadoran former professional footballer who played as a forward.

== Club career ==
Larios was born in Santa Ana, El Salvador. He came through the FAS youth system and made his debut with the senior team in October 2005, against Once Municipal.

He moved to Isidro Metapán before the Apertura 2010 season.

== International career ==
Larios officially received his first cap on November 15, 2006 in a friendly match against Bolivia.

He scored his first and only goal with the national team on September 6, 2008 in a 2010 FIFA World Cup qualification match against Haiti.

As of June 2011, he had earned nine caps scoring one goal, and he had represented his country in two FIFA World Cup qualification matches and played at the 2009 UNCAF Nations Cup as well as at the 2007 CONCACAF Gold Cup.

== Career statistics ==
#	Date	Venue	Opponent	Score	Result	Competition
1	6 September 2008	Estadio Cuscatlán, San Salvador, El Salvador	Haiti	4–0	5–0	2010 FIFA World Cup qualification
