= Juan Carlos Reyes (footballer) =

Uruguayan footballer (born 1976)

Personal information
- Full name: Juan Carlos Reyes Braun
- Date of birth: 15 October 1976 (age 50)
- Place of birth: Paysandú, Uruguay
- Height: 1.76 m (5 ft 9 in)
- Position: Forward

Senior career*
Years	Team	Apps	(Gls)
1998–1999	Nacional		
1999–2000	Fénix		
2000–2002	Bella Vista (Paysandú)	?	(11)
2003	Tacuarembó	31	(7)
2003–2004	Isidro Metapán		
2005	Luis Ángel Firpo		(7)
2005–2007	Once Municipal		
2008–2009	Nejapa	70	(18)
2009	Atlético Balboa	7	(1)
2010–2011	Jalapa	15	(1)
2011–2013	Juventud Independiente	27	(21)
2013	Topiltzin		
2014	Sonsonate		

Managerial career
- 2014: Municipal Ilopaneco
- 2015: Sonsonate (assistant)
- * Club domestic league appearances and goals

Juan Carlos Reyes Braun (born 15 October 1976) is a Uruguayan former professional footballer, who played as a forward. He participated in the third season of Bailando por un Sueño El Salvador.

== Honours ==
=== Player ===
Once Municipal

- Primera División: Apertura 2006
- Copa Presidente: 2006–07

Juventud Independiente

- Segunda División: 2011
