= Juan Camilo Mejía =

Colombian footballer (born 1981)

Personal information
- Full name: Juan Camilo Mejía Orozco
- Date of birth: August 30, 1981 (age 45)
- Place of birth: Antioch, Colombia
- Height: 1.77 m (5 ft 10 in)
- Position: Attacking midfielder

Youth career
- 1999–2003: Deportivo Rionegro

Senior career*
| Years | Team | Apps | (Gls) |
| 2003 | Envigado | | |
| 2004 | Atlético Bucaramanga | | |
| 2005–2007 | Águila | | |
| 2007–2008 | Chalatenango | | |
| 2008 | Águila | | |
| 2008–2009 | Deportivo Rionegro | | |
| 2009 | Inti Gas Deportes | | |
| 2010–2011 | Academia FC | | |
| 2012 | Vista Hermosa | | |
| 2012–2013 | Once Municipal | | |
- * Club domestic league appearances and goals as of 4 december 2006 ‡ National team caps and goals as of 2006

Juan Camilo Mejía Orozco (born August 30, 1981) is former a Colombian professional soccer player.

Mejia most recently played with Once Municipal of Primera División de Fútbol Profesional in El Salvador.

== Club career ==
He began playing professionally for Atlético Bucaramanga in his native country, and has also played for Colombian under-23 national side in the Preolímpicos of Chile and also has a champion's medal next to his name.
