= Luis Torres (footballer, born 1981) =

Colombian footballer

Personal information
- Full name: Luis Alberto Torres Rodríguez
- Date of birth: December 5, 1981 (age 44)
- Place of birth: Cartagena, Colombia
- Height: 1.78 m (5 ft 10 in)
- Position: Defender

Team information
- Current team: Luis Ángel Firpo
- Number: 5

Senior career*
| Years | Team | Apps | (Gls) |
| 1998–1999 | Atlético Bucaramanga | | |
| 2000–2003 | Independiente de Santa Fe | | |
| 2003 | Dragón | | |
| 2004–2007 | Vista Hermosa | | |
| 2008 | Atlético Balboa | | |
| 2009 | Peñarol La Mesilla | | |
| 2009–2010 | Atlético Balboa | | |
| 2011 | Vista Hermosa | | |
| 2012– | Luis Ángel Firpo | | |
- * Club domestic league appearances and goals

Luis Alberto Torres Rodríguez (born December 5, 1981) is a Colombian footballer who currently plays for Luis Ángel Firpo in El Salvador.
