= Primera División de Fútbol Profesional – Clausura 2011 =

Primera División de Fútbol de El Salvador
- Season: Clausura 2011
- Champions: Alianza; 10th title
- Relegated: Atlético Balboa
- 2011–12 CONCACAF Champions League: Alianza
- Matches: 90
- Goals: 224 (2.49 per match)
- Top goalscorer: Rodolfo Zelaya (13 Goals)
- Biggest home win: Alianza 5–0; UES (Mar. 31, 2011)
- Biggest away win: Atlético Balboa 0–4; Águila (Mar. 31, 2011)
- Highest scoring: Atlético Marte 5–2; Once Municipal (Feb. 6, 2011)

The Clausura 2011 season (officially known as Torneo Clausura 2011, and also as the Copa Capri for sponsoring reasons) was the 26th edition of Primera División de Fútbol de El Salvador since its establishment of an Apertura and Clausura format. Isidro Metapán headed into this tournament as the defending champions. The season began in early 2011 and concluded in mid year. Like previous years, the league consisted of 10 teams, each playing a home and away game against every other club for a total of 18 games per club during the season. The top four teams by the end of the regular season will take part of the playoffs.

== Team information ==
Last updated: December 29, 2010

=== Stadia and locations ===
Location of teams in Apertura 2010

Team	Home city	Stadium	Capacity
Águila	San Miguel	Juan Francisco Barraza	10,000
Alianza	San Salvador	Estadio Cuscatlán	45,925
Atlético Balboa	La Unión	Estadio Marcelino Imbers	4,000
Atlético Marte	San Salvador	Estadio Cuscatlán	45,925
FAS	Santa Ana	Estadio Óscar Quiteño	15,000
Isidro Metapán	Metapán	Estadio Jorge Calero Suárez	8,000
Luís Ángel Firpo	Usulután	Estadio Sergio Torres	5,000
Once Municipal	Ahuachapán	Estadio Simeón Magaña	5,000
UES	San Salvador	Estadio Universitario UES	10,000
Vista Hermosa	San Francisco Gotera	Estadio Correcaminos	12,000

=== Personnel and sponsoring ===
Team	Chairman	Head coach	Kitmaker	Shirt sponsor
Águila	(El Salvador) Julio Sosa	(Argentina) Hugo Coria		Mister Donuts, Volkswagen, Impressa Repuestos
Alianza	(El Salvador) Lisandro Pohl	(Paraguay) Roberto Gamarra	Lotto	Tigo, SINAI,
Atlético Balboa	(El Salvador) Pablo Robles	(El Salvador) Mario Martínez		Anorye en Acacua
Atlético Marte	(El Salvador) Felix Guardado	(El Salvador) Juan Ramón Paredes	Galaxia	Rosvill, Vive, Canal 4
FAS	(Colombia) Victor Aleman	(Peru) Agustín Castillo	Milan	American Airlines, Tigo, Pilsener
Isidro Metapán	(El Salvador) Óscar Flores	(El Salvador) Edwin Portillo	Milán	Bimbo, Tigo, arraz San Pedro, Holan
Luis Ángel Firpo	(El Salvador) Enrique Escobar	(Argentina) Ramiro Cepeda	Joma	Pilsener, Volkswagen, Diana, Tigo
Once Municipal	(El Salvador) Andrés Rodríguez	(El Salvador) Nelson Ancheta	Milan	La Geo, Canal 4
UES	(El Salvador) Rufino Quesada	(Brazil) Eraldo Correia	Galaxia	ALBA
Vista Hermosa	(El Salvador) Francisco Benitez	(El Salvador) Víctor Coreas	Aviva	None

== Managerial changes ==
=== Before the start of the season ===
Team	Outgoing manager	Manner of departure	Date of vacancy	Replaced by	Date of appointment	Position in table
FAS	(El Salvador) Jorge Abrego	Removed from position	TBA	(Peru) Agustín Castillo	tba	8th (Apertura 2010)
Águila	(Brazil) Eraldo Correia	Sacked	TBA	(Argentina) Hugo Coria	TBA	4th (Apertura 2010)
Atlético Balboa	(Paraguay) Roberto Gamarra	Released	December, 2010	(El Salvador) José Mario Martínez	December, 2010	5th (Apertura 2010)
Firpo	(Argentina) Hugo Coria	Resigned	TBA	(Argentina) Ramiro Cepeda	TBA	3rd (Apertura 2010)
C.D. Vista Hermosa	(El Salvador) José Mario Martínez	Sacked	29 November 2010	(El Salvador) Victor Coreas	27 December 2010	6th (Apertura 2010)

=== During the regular season ===
Team	Outgoing manager	Manner of departure	Date of vacancy	Replaced by	Date of appointment	Position in table
Once Municipal	(El Salvador) Nelson Mauricio Ancheta	Sacked	February 6, 2011	(El Salvador) Marcos Pineda (interim)	February 8, 2011	10th (Clausura 2011)
UES	(El Salvador) Edgar Henriquez	Sacked	March 7, 2011	(Brazil) Eraldo Correia	March 8, 2011	8th (Clausura 2011)
Alianza F.C.	(Serbia) Miloš Miljanić	Resigned	March 7, 2011	(Paraguay) Roberto Gamarra	March 8, 2011	5th (Clausura 2011)
Once Municipal	(El Salvador) Marcos Pineda	Sacked	March 16, 2011	(Argentina) Juan Andrés Sarulyte	March 17, 2011	th (Clausura 2011)

== League table ==
Pos	Team	Pld	W	D	L	GF	GA	GD	Pts	Qualification
1	Alianza	18	8	5	5	32	21	+11	29	Qualification for playoffs
2	FAS	18	7	8	3	29	24	+5	29	Qualification for playoffs
3	Isidro Metapán	18	9	2	7	26	24	+2	29	Qualification for playoffs
4	Luis Ángel Firpo	18	8	4	6	24	15	+9	28	Qualification for playoffs
5	Águila	18	7	6	5	27	21	+6	27	
6	Atlético Marte	18	8	3	7	25	24	+1	27	
7	Vista Hermosa	18	6	8	4	19	15	+4	26	
8	UES	18	3	8	7	14	25	−11	17	
9	Once Municipal	18	2	9	7	17	27	−10	15	
10	Atlético Balboa	18	3	5	10	11	28	−17	14	

Source: Soccerway
Rules for classification: 1st points; 2nd goal difference; 3rd goals scored

== Results ==
Home \ Away	ÁGU	ALI	BAL	ATM	FAS	FIR	MET	OMU	UES	VIS
Águila		3–2	2–0	1–1	1–1	1–0	2–1	3–1	2–0	1–1
Alianza	4–2		1–1	1–0	4–0	0–0	1–4	3–0	5–0	4–1
Atlético Balboa	0–4	2–1		3–0	0–0	0–2	1–0	1–1	1–2	0–2
Atlético Marte	3–3	2–1	2–0		1–2	1–0	1–2	5–2	1–0	0–1
C.D. FAS	2–0	1–1	3–0	2–0		2–0	1–3	2–2	1–1	1–1
Luis Ángel Firpo	2–1	3–0	4–0	4–1	2–2		2–0	2–1	1–1	1–0
Isidro Metapán	2–1	0–1	2–1	2–2	2–4	2–1		2–2	2–0	1–0
Once Municipal	0–0	1–1	1–0	0–1	3–3	1–0	0–1		1–1	1–1
C.D. Universidad de El Salvador	1–0	1–2	1–1	0–2	1–2	0–0	1–0	0–0		2–2
Vista Hermosa	0–0	0–0	0–0	0–2	2–0	2–0	3–0	1–0	2–2	

Source: soccerway.com
Legend: Blue = home team win; Yellow = draw; Red = away team win.

== Playoffs ==
Semifinals
1	FAS	2	2	4
4	Isidro Metapán	3	0	3
2	Alianza	1	1	2
3	Luis Ángel Firpo	1	1	2

Finals
1	FAS	1
2	Alianza	2

=== Semi-finals ===
==== First leg ====
30 April 2011
18:30 UTC-6

Isidro Metapán	3–2	FAS
Moscoso 38' (o.g.); Blanco 40'; Canales 85'	Report	Bentos 4'; Reyes 79'

Estadio Jorge Calero Suárez, Metapán
Referee: Fidel Mejía

1 May 2011
15:15UTC-6

Alianza	1–1	Luis Ángel Firpo
Zelaya 84'	Report	Quintanilla 45'

Estadio Cuscatlán, San Salvador
Referee: Edenilson Ventura

==== Second leg ====
8 May 2011
TBA UTC-6

Luis Ángel Firpo	1–1	Alianza
Erazo 89'		Zelaya 83'

Sergio Torres Stadium, Usulután

8 May 2011
TBA UTC-6

FAS	2–0	Isidro Metapán
Bentos 67'; Reyes 78'

Estadio Óscar Quiteño, Santa Ana

=== Final ===
15 May 2011
15:00 UTC-6

Alianza	2–1	FAS
Zelaya 41' (pen.), 74'		Velásquez 85'

Estadio Cuscatlán, San Salvador
Attendance: 23,419
Referee: Marlon Alfonso Mejía

Alianza:
GK	25	(El Salvador) Henry Hernández
DF	5	(El Salvador) Mauricio Quintanilla
DF	6	(El Salvador) Marcelo Messias	(yellow card) 42'
DF	3	(El Salvador) Edwin Martínez
MF	12	(El Salvador) Cristian Castillo	(substituted off) 90+1'
MF	20	(El Salvador) Héctor Salazar
MF	23	(El Salvador) Roberto Alvarado
MF	14	(El Salvador) Herbert Sosa
MF	8	(El Salvador) Abraham Amaya	(substituted off) 69'
FW	17	(El Salvador) Carlos Ayala (yellow card) 47'	(substituted off) 90+6'
FW	22	(El Salvador) Rodolfo Zelaya		(red card) 87'
Substitutes:
DF	16	(El Salvador) Roberto García		(substituted on) 69'
MF	21	(El Salvador) Jonathan Barrios		(substituted on) 90+1'
FW	11	(El Salvador) Rafael Burgos		(substituted on) 90+6'
Manager:
(Argentina) Roberto Gamarra

FAS:
GK	1	(El Salvador) Luis Contreras
DF	5	(El Salvador) Víctor Velásquez (yellow card) 21'
DF	26	(El Salvador) Mardoqueo Henríquez	(substituted off) 86'
DF	6	(El Salvador) José Granadino
DF	4	(El Salvador) Ramón Flores (red card) 90+6'
MF	24	(Colombia) Roberto Peña
MF	7	(El Salvador) William Maldonado	(substituted off) 46'
MF	8	(El Salvador) Cristian Álvarez
MF	13	(El Salvador) Juan Carlos Moscoso	(substituted off) 74'
FW	9	(Argentina) Alejandro Bentos		(yellow card) 50'
FW	11	(El Salvador) Williams Reyes
Substitutes:
FW	20	(Brazil) Márcio Teruel		(substituted on) 46'
MF	23	(El Salvador) Carlos Aparicio		(substituted on) 74'
FW	21	(El Salvador) Óscar Ulloa		(substituted on) 86'
Manager:
(Peru) Agustín Castillo

Clausura 2011 champions

10th title

== Top scorers ==
Rank	Scorer	Club	Goals
1	(El Salvador) Rodolfo Zelaya	Alianza F.C.	13
2	(El Salvador) (Panama) Nicolás Muñoz	C.D. Águila	12
3	(Uruguay) Alcides Bandera	Atlético Marte	9
4	(El Salvador) Juan Carlos Moscoso	C.D. FAS	7
5	(El Salvador) Alexander Campos	Atlético Balboa	5
5	(El Salvador) Christian Bautista	A.D. Isidro Metapán	5

Updated to games played on April 21, 2011.
Post-season goals are not included, only regular season goals.

== Aggregate table ==
Pos	Team	Pld	W	D	L	GF	GA	GD	Pts	Qualification or relegation
1	Isidro Metapán (C)	36	19	6	11	60	51	+9	63	Qualification for 2011–12 CONCACAF Champions League Preliminary Round
2	Alianza (C)	36	17	11	8	57	34	+23	62	Qualification for 2011–12 CONCACAF Champions League Preliminary Round
3	Luis Ángel Firpo	36	16	11	9	48	32	+16	59	
4	Águila	36	16	10	10	48	40	+8	58	
5	FAS	36	11	13	12	48	52	−4	46	
6	Vista Hermosa	36	9	18	9	39	40	−1	45	
7	Atlético Marte	36	12	8	16	47	52	−5	44	
8	Atlético Balboa (R)	36	10	13	13	40	43	−3	43	Relegation to Segunda Division (Note: Atlético Balboa were relegated due to failure to pay members of their organization and other problems which caused them to not play in their final two league matches of the season. Once Municipal have claimed that this should spare them from relegation. On 13 June 2011, the league voted for Once Municipal to remain in the competition for next season.)
9	UES	36	6	15	15	37	52	−15	33	
10	Once Municipal	36	5	14	17	30	52	−22	29	

Source: El Gráfico
Rules for classification: 1st points; 2nd goal difference; 3rd goals scored
(C) Champions; (R) Relegated

== List of foreign players in the league ==
This is a list of foreign players in Clausura 2011. The following players:

1. have played at least one apertura game for the respective club.
2. have not been capped for the El Salvador national football team on any level, independently from the birthplace

A new rule was introduced this season that clubs can only have three foreign players per club and can only add a new player if there is an injury or player/s is released.

C.D. Águila

- (Argentina) Patricio Barroche
- (Uruguay) Matías Cresseri
- (Uruguay) Diego Seoane

Alianza F.C.

- None

Atlético Marte

- (Brazil) Glauber Da Silva
- (Uruguay) Alcides Bandera
- (Honduras) Ramon Castillo

Atlético Balboa

- (Colombia) Julián Cruz
- (Colombia) Andres Medina
- (Honduras) Franklin Webster

C.D. FAS

- (Argentina) Alejandro Bentos
- (Colombia) Roberto Peña
- (Brazil) Marcio Teruel

(player released mid season)

C.D. Luis Ángel Firpo

- (Argentina) Fernando Leguizamón
- (Brazil) José Oliveira de Souza

A.D. Isidro Metapán

- (Honduras) Ernesto Aquino
- (Panama) Anel Canales
- (Uruguay) Paolo Suárez

Once Municipal

- (Panama) Luis Mendoza
- (Panama) Publio Rodriguez
- (Panama) Anthony Basile

UES

- (Colombia) Cristian González
- (Mexico) Manuel García
- (Brazil) Raphael Alves da Silva

Vista Hermosa

- (Colombia) John Castillo
- (Colombia) Luis Torres
- (Brazil) Leonardo Da Silva
