= Primera División de Fútbol Profesional – Apertura 2011 =

Primera División de Fútbol de El Salvador
- Season: Apertura 2011
- Champions: Isidro Metapán (6th Title)
- Relegated: "None"
- Champions League: Isidro Metapán
- Matches: 90
- Goals: 233 (2.59 per match)
- Top goalscorer: Nicolás Muñoz (15 goals)
- Biggest home win: Águila 5-1 Juventud Independiente (28 August 2011); Once Municipal 5-0 Vista Hermosa (27 November 2011)
- Biggest away win: Isidro Metapán 1-4 Juventud Independiente (27 November 2011)
- Highest scoring: Luis Ángel Firpo 6-3 Once Municipal (2 November 2011)
- Longest winning run: 4 games by FAS and Once Municipal
- Longest unbeaten run: 8 games by FAS and Once Municipal
- Longest winless run: 14 games by UES
- Longest losing run: 6 games by Juventud Independiente

The Apertura 2011 season (officially known as Torneo Apertura 2011 or also known as the Copa Capri for sponsoring reasons) was the 27th edition of El Salvador's Primera División since its establishment of an Apertura and Clausura format. Alianza were the defending champions. The season began on 30 July 2011 and concluded at the end of the year. As in previous years, the league consisted of 10 teams, each playing a home and away game against every other club for a total of 18 games per club during the season. The top four teams by the end of the season took part in the playoffs.

== Team information ==
Last updated: June 28, 2011

== Promotion and relegation ==
Promoted from Segunda División de Fútbol Salvadoreño as of June 28, 2011.

- Champions: Juventud Independiente

Relegated to Segunda División de Fútbol Salvadoreño as of June 28, 2011.

- Due to Issue: Atlético Balboa

== Stadia and locations ==
Location of teams in Apertura 2011/Clausura 2012

Team	Home city	Stadium	Capacity
Águila	San Miguel	Juan Francisco Barraza	10,000
Alianza	San Salvador	Estadio Cuscatlán	45,925
Atlético Marte	San Salvador	Estadio Cuscatlán	45,925
FAS	Santa Ana	Estadio Óscar Quiteño	15,000
Isidro Metapán	Metapán	Estadio Jorge Calero Suárez	8,000
Juventud Independiente	San Juan Opico	Complejo Municipal	5,000
Luís Ángel Firpo	Usulután	Estadio Sergio Torres	5,000
Once Municipal	Ahuachapán	Estadio Simeón Magaña	5,000
UES	San Salvador	Estadio Universitario UES	10,000
Vista Hermosa	San Francisco Gotera	Estadio Correcaminos	12,000

=== Personnel and sponsoring ===
Team	Chairman	Head coach	Kitmaker	Shirt sponsor
Águila	(El Salvador) Julio Sosa	(El Salvador) Salvador Coreas	Galaxia	Mister Donuts, Volkswagen, Impressa Repuestos, Soccerway
Alianza	(El Salvador) Lisandro Pohl	(El Salvador) (Serbia) Vladan Vićević	Lotto	Tigo, SINAI, Maseca
Atlético Marte	(El Salvador) Felix Guardado	(El Salvador) Fausto Omar Vásquez	Galaxia	Rosvill, Vive, Canal 4
FAS	(El Salvador) David Lineras	(El Salvador) Willian Renderos Iraheta	Milan (Jaguar Sportic)	Pepsi, Farmacia San Lorenzo, Alba Petróleos
Isidro Metapán	(El Salvador) Rafael Morataya	(El Salvador) Edwin Portillo	Milán (Jaguar Sportic)	Grupo Bimbo, Tigo, Arroz San Pedro, Holan
Juventud Independiente	(El Salvador) Romeo Barillas	(El Salvador) Juan Ramón Sánchez	Milán (Jaguar Sportic)	TBD
Luis Ángel Firpo	(El Salvador) Enrique Escobar	(El Salvador) Nelson Ancheta	Joma	Pilsener, Volkswagen, Diana, Tigo
Once Municipal	(El Salvador) Andrés Rodríguez	(Argentina) Juan Andrés Sarulyte	Milan (Jaguar Sportic)	LA GEO, Milan (Jaguar Sportic)
UES	(El Salvador) Rufino Quesada	(El Salvador) Jorge Abrego	Galaxia	ALBA
Vista Hermosa	(El Salvador) Francisco Benitez	(El Salvador) Víctor Coreas	Aviva	TBD

== Managerial changes ==
=== Before the start of the season ===
Team	Outgoing manager	Manner of departure	Date of vacancy	Replaced by	Date of appointment	Position in table
FAS	(Colombia) Margarita Jaramillo			(El Salvador) David Linares		2nd (Clausura 2011)
FAS	(Peru) Agustín Castillo			(El Salvador) Willian Renderos Iraheta		2nd (Clausura 2011)
Luis Ángel Firpo	(Argentina) Ramiro Cepeda			(El Salvador) Nelso Ancheta		4th (Clausura 2011)

=== During the regular season ===
Team	Outgoing manager	Manner of departure	Date of vacancy	Replaced by	Date of appointment	Position in table
Alianza	(Paraguay) Roberto Gamarra	Head Coach	September 6, 2011	(El Salvador) (Serbia) Vladan Vićević	September 7, 2011	2nd (Apertura 2011)
Águila	(Argentina) Hugo Coria	Head Coach	September, 2011	(El Salvador) Salvador Coreas	October 18, 2011	6th (Apertura 2011)
Atlético Marte	(El Salvador) Juan Ramón Paredes	Head Coach	September 23, 2011	(El Salvador) Fausto Omar Vásquez	September 27, 2011	9th (Apertura 2011)
UES	(Brazil) Eraldo Correia	Head Coach	September 25, 2011	(El Salvador) Miguel Ángel Soriano	September 27, 2011	7th (Apertura 2011)
UES	(El Salvador) Miguel Ángel Soriano	Head Coach	October, 2011	(El Salvador) Jorge Abrego	October, 2011	9th (Apertura 2011)
Vista Hermosa	(El Salvador) Víctor Coreas	Head Coach	November 3, 2011	(El Salvador) José Rolando Perez	November 4, 2011	10th (Apertura 2011)

== League table ==
Pos	Team	Pld	W	D	L	GF	GA	GD	Pts	Qualification
1	Isidro Metapán (C, Q)	18	11	3	4	32	21	+11	36	Qualification for playoffs (Note: Luis Ángel Firpo won the extra game against Águila for the last place of the Playoffs.)
2	FAS (Q)	18	9	5	4	24	17	+7	32	Qualification for playoffs
3	Once Municipal (Q)	18	8	6	4	29	20	+9	30	Qualification for playoffs
4	Águila (Q)	18	8	5	5	34	26	+8	29	Qualification for playoffs
5	Luis Ángel Firpo (Q)	18	8	5	5	31	27	+4	29	Qualification for playoffs
6	Alianza	18	6	6	6	18	17	+1	24	
7	Atlético Marte	18	6	5	7	21	21	0	23	
8	Juventud Independiente	18	5	2	11	18	30	−12	17	
9	UES	18	2	8	8	15	29	−14	14	
10	Vista Hermosa	18	1	7	10	11	25	−14	10	

Updated to match(es) played on 23 November 2011. Source: elgrafico.com
Rules for classification: 1) points; 2) goal difference; 3) number of goals scored.
(C) Champions; (Q) Qualified for the phase indicated

== Positions by round ==
Team ╲ Round	1	2	3	4	5	6	7	8	9	10	11	12	13	14	15	16	17	18
Isidro Metapán	2	2	5	3	1	3	3	2	4	2	1	1	1	1	1	1	1	1
FAS	5	7	2	5	3	1	2	1	1	1	2	2	2	2	2	2	2	2
Once Municipal	4	8	6	7	8	6	8	8	5	5	3	3	3	4	3	3	5	3
Águila	3	10	4	6	5	4	6	6	3	6	4	4	4	3	4	4	3	4
Luis Ángel Firpo	6	1	3	2	6	5	5	4	6	4	6	7	6	5	5	5	4	5
Alianza	10	4	1	1	2	2	1	3	2	3	5	5	5	6	6	6	6	6
Atlético Marte	1	6	9	9	9	9	9	9	8	7	7	6	7	7	7	7	7	7
Juventud Independiente	9	5	8	8	10	10	10	10	10	10	10	10	8	8	8	8	8	8
UES	7	3	7	4	4	7	4	5	7	8	8	8	9	9	9	9	9	9
Vista Hermosa	8	9	10	10	7	8	7	7	9	9	9	9	10	10	10	10	10	10

= Leader; = Qualification to the playoffs; = Last place

== Results ==
Home \ Away	ÁGU	ALI	ATM	FAS	FIR	MET	JUV	OMU	UES	VIS
Águila		1–2	2–0	1–1	3–2	1–0	5–1	2–2	3–0	2–2
Alianza	1–1		0–1	1–2	1–1	0–1	1–0	0–1	0–0	2–1
Atlético Marte	2–4	0–2		0–0	0–1	5–3	3–0	1–1	2–0	0–0
C.D. FAS	1–3	2–1	1–0		1–1	3–0	2–1	2–1	1–0	3–1
Luis Ángel Firpo	2–0	2–2	1–0	3–1		1–3	2–1	6–3	1–1	0–2
Isidro Metapán	3–1	1–0	2–1	0–0	4–2		0–1	1–1	4–2	1–0
Juventud Independiente	2–1	1–2	1–2	1–0	2–3	1–4		1–2	3–1	1–1
Once Municipal	2–0	1–2	1–1	1–0	2–1	1–1	0–0		0–1	5–0
C.D. Universidad de El Salvador	2–2	1–1	2–2	0–2	1–1	1–3	1–0	1–3		0–0
Vista Hermosa	1–2	0–0	0–1	2–2	0–1	0–1	0–1	0–2	1–1	

Updated to match(es) played on 23 November 2011. Source:

These matches previously scheduled for August 17, (v.Metapán), September 21, (V. Metapán) were postponed to October 5 (Firpo v. Metapán), October 10 (Vista v. Metapán) respectively, because of the 2011–12 CONCACAF Champions League.

These matches previously scheduled for September 3 or 4, were postponed to September 21 respectively, because of the El Salvador 2014 FIFA World Cup qualification matches.
Legend: Blue = home team win; Yellow = draw; Red = away team win.

== Playoffs ==
Semifinals
1	Isidro Metapán	3	3	6
4	L.A. Firpo	3	0	3
2	FAS	0	1	1
3	Once Municipal	1	2	3

Final
1	Isidro Metapán	1
3	Once Municipal	0

=== Semi-finals ===
==== First leg ====
December 3, 2011
19:00 UTC-6

Isidro Metapán	3–3	Luis Ángel Firpo
Blanco 22'; Turcios 51' (o.g.); Flores 68'	Report	García 3'; Alas 69'; Jiménez 90'

Estadio Jorge Calero Suárez, Metapán
Attendance: 2,530
Referee: Elmer Arturo Bonilla

December 4, 2011
15:00 UTC-6

Once Municipal	1–0	FAS
Figueroa 58'	Report

Estadio Simeón Magaña, Ahuachapán
Attendance: 3,947
Referee: Kenso Araujo

==== Second leg ====
December 10, 2011
15:00 UTC-6

Luis Ángel Firpo	0–3	Isidro Metapán
	Report	Blanco 38', 79'; Sánchez 69'

Sergio Torres Stadium, Usulután
Referee: Marlon Mejía

December 11, 2011
19:00 UTC-6

FAS	1–2	Once Municipal
Williams Reyes 45'	Report	Pablo Hütt 68'; Sean Fraser 84'

Estadio Óscar Quiteño, Santa Ana
Attendance: 14,000
Referee: Fidel Mejía

=== Final ===
December 18, 2011
15:00 UTC-6

Isidro Metapán	1–0	Once Municipal
Suárez 51'	Report

Estadio Cuscatlán, San Salvador
Attendance: 24,700
Referee: Élmer Bonilla

Isidro Metapán:
GK	1	(El Salvador) Miguel Montes
DF	23	(El Salvador) Ricardo Alvarado
DF	19	(El Salvador) Alexander Escobar
DF	2	(El Salvador) Milton Molina
DF	15	(El Salvador) Alfredo Pacheco
FW	14	(El Salvador) Andrés Flores (substituted off) 90+4'
MF	20	(El Salvador) Héctor Mejía
MF	16	(El Salvador) Ramón Sánchez (yellow card) 72'
MF	10	(Uruguay) Paolo Suárez
FW	17	(El Salvador) Léster Blanco	(substituted off) 88'
FW	9	(Brazil) Allan Kardeck (yellow card) 73'	(substituted off) 77'
Substitutes:
DF	5	(Honduras) Ernesto Aquino	(substituted on) 77'
FW	11	(El Salvador) Christian Bautista	(substituted on) 88'
FW	12	(El Salvador) Edwin Sánchez	(substituted on) 90+4'
Manager:
(El Salvador) Edwin Portillo

Once Municipal:
GK	1	(El Salvador) Jassir Deras
DF	5	(El Salvador) Julio Castro
DF	22	(Colombia) Miguel Solís
DF	2	(Colombia) Andrés Medina
FW	11	(El Salvador) Ricardo Orellana	(substituted off) 55'
MF	7	(El Salvador) Ronald Pimentel
MF	18	(El Salvador) Juan Lazo (yellow card) 63'
MF	8	(El Salvador) Diego Chavarría
MF	6	(Colombia) Elder Figueroa (yellow card) 72' (yellow-red card) 85'
FW	15	(El Salvador) Mario Deras (yellow card) 46'	(substituted off) 48'
FW	12	(Jamaica) Sean Fraser (yellow card) 95'
Substitutes:
FW	9	(El Salvador) Alexander Campos (yellow card) 54'	(substituted on) 48'
MF	10	(Mexico) Pablo Hütt	(substituted on) 55'
Manager:
(Argentina) Juan Andrés Sarulyte

Apertura 2011 champions

6th title

== Player statistics ==
=== Top scorers ===
Rank	Scorer	Club	Goals
1	(Panama) Nicolás Muñoz	Águila	15
2	(Jamaica) Sean Fraser	Once Municipal	14
2	(Panama) Anel Canales	Luis Ángel Firpo	14
4	(El Salvador) Williams Reyes	FAS	10
5	(El Salvador) Osael Romero	Águila	8
5	(Uruguay) Paolo Suárez	Isidro Metapán	8
7	(Brazil) Leonardo Da Silva	Alianza	6
8	(Uruguay) Juan Carlos Reyes	Juventud Independiente	6
9	(El Salvador) Víctor Turcios	Luis Ángel Firpo	5
9	(El Salvador) Christopher Ramírez	Atlético Marte	5
9	(El Salvador) Alfredo Pacheco	Isidro Metapán	5
9	(El Salvador) Walter Soto	Vista Hermosa	5

Updated to games played on November 23, 2011. 
Post-season goals are not included, only regular season goals.

==== Bookings ====
Rank	Team	Yellow card	Red card	Total
1	Luis Ángel Firpo	20	6	26
2	Alianza	33	1	34
3	UES	36	1	37
4	Isidro Metapán	36	3	39
4	Vista Hermosa	35	4	39
6	Juventud Independiente	38	5	43
7	FAS	45	3	48
8	Atlético Marte	43	4	47
9	Once Municipal	48	8	56
10	Águila	53	4	57
	Total	383	39	422

=== Hat-tricks ===
Sequence	Player	No. of goals	Time of goals	Representing	Final score	Opponent	Round
1.	(Panama) Nicolás Muñoz	3	8', 59' (p), 72'	Águila	3–0	UES	3rd
2.	(Panama) Nicolás Muñoz	3	16', 25' (p), 72'	Águila	5-1	Juventud Independiente	5th
3.	(Panama) Anel Canales	3	29', 31', 46',	Luis Ángel Firpo	6-3	Once Municipal	15th
4.	(Jamaica) Sean Fraser	3	36' 65', 86,	Once Municipal	5-0	C.D. Vista Hermosa	18th

=== Individual awards ===
Hombre GOL	Best Coach Award	Best Goalkeeper Award	Fair Player Award	Rookie Player Award	Kings of the Stands
(Panama) Anel Canales; Águila	(El Salvador) Edwin Portillo; Isidro Metapán	(El Salvador) Luis Contreras; FAS	(El Salvador) Luis Contreras; FAS	(El Salvador) Darwin Cerén; Juventud Independiente	FAS

== Season statistics ==
=== Scoring ===
- First goal of the season: (El Salvador) Osael Romero for Águila against Once Municipal 39 minutes (30 July 2011)
- Fastest goal in a match: 2 minutes
  - (Panama) Anel Canales for C.D. Luis Ángel Firpo against FAS (2 October 2011)
- Goal scored at the latest point in a match: 90+4 minutes
  - (El Salvador) Jaime Alas for Firpo against FAS (31 July 2011)
  - (El Salvador) Mardoqueo Henríquez for Águila against Firpo (22 October 2011)
- First penalty Kick of the season: 45 minutes- (El Salvador) Williams Reyes (scored) for FAS against Luis Ángel Firpo
- Widest winning margin: 5
  - Águila 5-1 Juventud Independiente (28 August 2011)
  - Once Municipal 5-0 Vista Hermosa (27 November 2011)
- Most goals in a match: 9
  - Luis Ángel Firpo 6-3 Once Municipal (2 November 2011)
- First hat-trick of the season: (Panama) Nicolás Muñoz for Águila against UES (17 August 2011)
- First own goal of the season: (El Salvador) Fidel Jiménez (Atlético Marte) for Firpo (21 August 2011)
- Most goals by one player in a single match: 3
  - (Panama) Nicolás Muñoz for Águila against UES (17 August 2011)
  - (Panama) Nicolás Muñoz for Águila against Juventud Independiente (28 August 2011)
  - (Panama) Anel Canales for Luis Ángel Firpo against Once Municipal (2 November 2011)
  - (Jamaica) Sean Fraser for Once Municipal against Vista Hermosa (27 November 2011)
- Most goals by one team in a match: 6
  - Luis Ángel Firpo 6-3 Once Municipal (2 November 2011)
- Most goals in one half by one team: 4
  - Juventud Independiente 1-4 Isidro Metapán(27 November 2011)
- Most goals scored by losing team: 3
  - Luis Ángel Firpo 6-3 Once Municipal (2 November 2011)
  - Atlético Marte 5-3 Isidro Metapán(5 November 2011)

=== Average home attendance ===
- Highest average home attendance:
- Lowest average home attendance:

=== Clean sheets ===
- Most clean sheets - 6 FAS and Atlético Marte
- Fewest clean sheets - 3 Águila

=== Unbeaten run ===
- Longest winning run - 4 games FAS (28 August-21 September) and Once Municipal (21 September-23 October)
- Longest unbeaten run - 8 games FAS (1 August-21 September) and Once Municipal (21 September-30 October)
- Longest winless run - 14 games UES(27 August-27 November 2011)
- Longest losing run - 6 games Juventud Independiente (17 August-21 September)

== List of foreign players in the league ==
This is a list of foreign players in Apertura 2011. The following players:

1. have played at least one apertura game for the respective club.
2. have not been capped for the El Salvador national football team on any level, independently from the birthplace

A new rule was introduced a few season ago, that clubs can only have three foreign players per club and can only add a new player if there is an injury or player/s is released.

C.D. Águila

- (Brazil) Lucas Marcal
- (Brazil) Glauber Da Silva
- (Brazil) Rómulo

Alianza F.C.

- (Brazil) Leonardo Da Silva
- (Colombia) John Castillo

Atlético Marte

- (Ghana) James Owusu-Ansah
- (Uruguay) Alcides Bandera
- (Paraguay) Juan Ángel Sosa

Juventud Independiente

- (Uruguay) Juan Carlos Reyes
- (Brazil) Valtinho
- (Brazil) Alyson Batista
- (Brazil) Leonardo Viera Lima

C.D. FAS

- (Argentina) Alejandro Bentos
- (Colombia) Roberto Peña
- (Brazil) Marcio Teruel

(player released mid season)

C.D. Luis Ángel Firpo

- (Panama) Anel Canales
- (Costa Rica) Erick Marín
- (Brazil) Pilo

A.D. Isidro Metapán

- (Honduras) Ernesto Aquino
- (Brazil) Allan Kardeck
- (Uruguay) Paolo Suárez

Once Municipal

- (Mexico) Pablo Hütt
- (Jamaica) Sean Fraser
- (Colombia) Andres Medina

UES

- TBA
- (Brazil) Flavio Viana
- (Brazil) Raphael Alves

Vista Hermosa

- (Colombia) Miguel Potes Mina
- (Colombia) Luis Torres
- (Jamaica) Garrick Gordon
