= Primera División de Fútbol Profesional – Apertura 2010 =

Primera División de Fútbol de El Salvador
- Season: Apertura 2010
- Champions: Isidro Metapán
- Relegated: None in the Apertura
- 2011–12 CONCACAF Champions League: Isidro Metapán
- Matches: 95
- Goals: 234 (2.46 per match)
- Top goalscorer: (9 goals); Alexander Campos; Rodolfo Zelaya
- Biggest home win: Alianza 5–0; Luís Ángel Firpo (October 3, 2010)
- Biggest away win: Once Municipal 0–3; Luís Ángel Firpo (Nov. 10, 2010)
- Highest scoring: Isidro Metapán 4–3 Atlético Marte (August 14, 2010)

The Apertura 2010 season (officially known as Torneo Apertura 2010) was the 25th edition of Primera División de Fútbol de El Salvador since its establishment of an Apertura and Clausura format. Isidro Metapán, being the defending champions, kept the title as they won the final against Alianza on penalties. The season begun on July 31 and concluded on December 19, 2010. Like previous years, the league consisted of 10 teams, each playing a home and away game against the other clubs for a total of 18 games, respectively. The top four teams by the end of the regular season took part of the playoffs.

== Promotion and relegation ==
Teams promoted from 2009–10 Segunda División

- UES
- Once Municipal

Teams relegated to 2010–11 Segunda División

- Alacranes Del Norte
- Municipal Limeño

== Team information ==
Last updated: June 30, 2010

=== Stadia and locations ===
Location of teams in Apertura 2010

Team	Home city	Stadium	Capacity
Águila	San Miguel	Juan Francisco Barraza	10,000
Alianza	San Salvador	Estadio Cuscatlán	45,925
Atlético Balboa	La Union	Estadio Marcelino Imbers	4,000
Atlético Marte	San Salvador	Estadio Cuscatlán	45,925
FAS	Santa Ana	Estadio Óscar Quiteño	15,000
Isidro Metapán	Metapán	Estadio Jorge Calero Suárez	8,000
Luís Ángel Firpo	Usulután	Estadio Sergio Torres	5,000
Once Municipal	Ahuachapán	Estadio Simeón Magaña	5,000
UES	San Salvador	Estadio Universitario UES	10,000
Vista Hermosa	San Francisco Gotera	Estadio Correcaminos	12,000

=== Personnel and sponsoring ===
Team	Chairman	Head coach	Kitmaker	Shirt sponsor
Águila	(El Salvador) Will Salgado	(Brazil) Eraldo Correia	Nike	Tigo, Mister Donut
Alianza	(El Salvador) Lisandro Pohl	(Serbia) Miloš Miljanić	Lotto	Tigo, Sinai, Fiesta
Atlético Balboa	(El Salvador) Pablo Robles	(Argentina) Roberto Gamarra	Aviva	Fila
Atlético Marte	(El Salvador) Felix Guardado	(El Salvador) Juan Ramón Paredes	Galaxia	Rosvill, Vive, Galaxia
FAS	(El Salvador) Byron Rodriguez	(El Salvador) Jorge Abrego	Milán	American Airlines, Tigo, Pilsener
Isidro Metapán	(El Salvador) Adan Salazar	(El Salvador) Edwin Portillo	Milán	Bimbo, Tigo, Salazar
Luis Ángel Firpo	(El Salvador) Jozsef Arguedas	(Argentina) Hugo Coria	Joma	Diana, Pilsener
Once Municipal	(El Salvador) Andrés Rodríguez	(El Salvador) Nelson Ancheta	Milán	La Geo
UES	(El Salvador) Rufino Quesada	(El Salvador) Edgar Henriquez	Galaxia	MK Medicamentos, ALBA Petroleos
Vista Hermosa	(El Salvador) Francisco Benitez	(El Salvador) Mario Martínez	Aviva	Tigo

== Managerial changes ==
=== Before the start of the season ===
Team	Outgoing manager	Manner of departure	Date of vacancy	Replaced by	Date of appointment	Position in table
FAS	(El Salvador) Adolfo Menéndez	Removed from position	April 27, 2010	(Colombia) Alberto Rujana	July 1, 2010	7th (Clausura 2010)
Águila	(Uruguay) Rubén Alonso	Sacked	May 25, 2010	(Guatemala) Carlos Mijangos	June 4, 2010	2nd (Clausura 2010)
Atlético Balboa	(Guatemala) Carlos Mijangos	Signed by Águila	June 3, 2010	(Argentina) Roberto Gamarra	June 3, 2010	5th (Clausura 2010)
UES	(El Salvador) Miguel Ángel Díaz	Resigned	June 21, 2010	(Uruguay) Rubén Alonso	June 23, 2010	1st (Clausura 2010)

=== During the regular season ===
Team	Outgoing manager	Manner of departure	Date of vacancy	Replaced by	Date of appointment	Position in table
Águila	(Guatemala) Carlos Mijangos	Sacked	August 31, 2010	(Brazil) Eraldo Correia	September 1, 2010	5th (Apertura 2010)
Atlético Marte	(Argentina) Ramiro Cepeda	Resigned	September 15, 2010	(El Salvador) Luis Guevara Mora (interim)	September 18, 2010	9th (Apertura 2010)
FAS	(Colombia) Alberto Rujana	Resigned	September 19, 2010	(El Salvador) Jorge Abrego	September 20, 2010	10th (Apertura 2010)
Atlético Marte	(El Salvador) Luis Guevara Mora	Resigned	October 25, 2010	(El Salvador) Juan Ramón Paredes	October 25, 2010	10th (Apertura 2010)
UES	(Uruguay) Rubén Alonso	Resigned	November 10, 2010	(El Salvador) Edgar Henriquez	November 12, 2010	10th (Apertura 2010)

== League table ==
Pos	Team	Pld	W	D	L	GF	GA	GD	Pts	Qualification
1	Isidro Metapán (C)	18	10	4	4	34	27	+7	34	Qualification for playoffs
2	Alianza	18	9	6	3	26	13	+13	33	Qualification for playoffs
3	Luis Ángel Firpo	18	8	7	3	24	17	+7	31	Qualification for playoffs
4	Águila	18	9	4	5	22	19	+3	31	Qualification for playoffs
5	Atlético Balboa	18	7	8	3	21	16	+5	29	
6	Vista Hermosa	18	3	9	6	20	25	−5	18	
7	Atlético Marte	18	4	5	9	22	28	−6	17	
8	FAS	18	4	5	9	19	28	−9	17	
9	UES	18	3	7	8	23	27	−4	16	
10	Once Municipal	18	3	5	10	16	27	−11	14	

Updated to match(es) played on November 28, 2010. Source: FIFA
Rules for classification: 1st points; 2nd goal difference; 3rd goals scored
(C) Champions

== Results ==
Home \ Away	ÁGU	ALI	BAL	ATM	FAS	FIR	MET	OMU	UES	VIS
Águila		0–2	2–0	2–1	3–1	1–1	4–1	1–0	1–0	2–1
Alianza	4–0		0–0	2–1	4–0	5–0	0–0	1–0	2–2	2–0
Atlético Balboa	1–0	2–0		1–1	1–1	2–0	3–0	3–2	1–0	2–2
Atlético Marte	0–2	0–1	0–0		1–1	0–2	1–2	0–1	3–1	3–2
C.D. FAS	2–1	3–0	0–1	0–1		0–2	1–2	1–1	2–2	1–0
Luis Ángel Firpo	1–2	0–0	2–0	2–2	1–0		1–1	2–0	1–0	3–1
Isidro Metapán	3–0	3–0	4–2	4–3	2–0	2–2		1–2	2–1	2–1
Once Municipal	0–0	0–0	1–1	1–2	2–3	0–3	2–3		1–0	0–0
C.D. Universidad de El Salvador	0–0	1–2	1–1	2–2	2–1	1–1	3–1	4–2		3–3
Vista Hermosa	1–1	1–1	0–0	2–1	2–2	0–0	1–1	2–1	1–0	

Updated to match(es) played on November 28, 2010. Source: soccerway.com
Legend: Blue = home team win; Yellow = draw; Red = away team win.

== Playoffs ==
Semifinals
1	Isidro Metapán	2	0	2
4	Águila	1	0	1
2	Alianza (a)	1	1	2
3	Luis Ángel Firpo	2	0	2

Finals
1	Isidro Metapán (pen.)	0 (4)
2	Alianza	0 (3)

=== Semi-finals ===
==== First leg ====
December 4, 2010
19:00 UTC-6

Águila	1–2	Isidro Metapán
Martin 58'		Héctor Mejía 55'; Jilbert Álvarez 90+4' (o.g.)

Estadio Juan Francisco Barraza
San Miguel, San Miguel
Referee: Fidel Mejía

December 5, 2010
15:15 UTC-6

Alianza	1–2	Luis Ángel Firpo
Willer 51' (pen.)		Quintanilla 4'; Alas 21'

Estadio Cuscatlán
San Salvador, San Salvador
Referee: Jaime Carpio

==== Second leg ====
December 11, 2010
18:00 UTC-6

Isidro Metapán	0–0	Águila

Estadio Jorge Calero Suárez
Metapán, Santa Ana
Referee: Edenilson Ventura

December 12, 2010
14:30 UTC-6

Luis Ángel Firpo	0–1	Alianza
		Ayala 45'

Sergio Torres Stadium
Usulután, Usulután
Referee: Marlon Mejía

=== Final ===
December 19, 2010
15:15 UTC-6

Isidro Metapán	0–0 (a.e.t.)	Alianza
Penalties
Elías Montes (penalty scored); Léster Blanco (penalty scored); Jorge Morán (penalty scored); Ricardo Alvarado (penalty missed); Emerson Umaña (penalty scored)	4–3	Willer Souza (penalty scored); Julio Enrique Martínez (penalty scored); Juan Lazo (penalty missed); Christian Castillo (penalty scored); Rodolfo Zelaya (penalty missed)

Estadio Cuscatlán
San Salvador, San Salvador
Referee: Joel Aguilar

Isidro Metapán:
GK	19	(El Salvador) Fidel Mondragón
DF	23	(El Salvador) Ricardo Alvarado
DF	2	(El Salvador) Milton Molina
DF	5	(Honduras) Ernesto Aquino		(substituted off) 85'
DF	20	(El Salvador) Omar Mejía
MF	14	(El Salvador) Andrés Flores	(yellow card) 45'	(substituted off) 112'
MF	16	(El Salvador) Óscar Jiménez
MF	10	(Uruguay) Paolo Suárez
MF	7	(El Salvador) Jorge Morán	(yellow card) 30'
FW	17	(El Salvador) Léster Blanco
FW	9	(Panama) Anel Canales		(substituted off) 115'
Substitutes:
DF	4	(El Salvador) Carlos Carillo		(substituted on) 85'
MF	22	(El Salvador) Emerson Umaña		(substituted on) 112'
FW	11	(El Salvador) Elías Montes		(substituted on) 115'
Manager:
(El Salvador) Edwin Portillo

Alianza:
GK	24	(El Salvador) Rafael Fuentes
DF	5	(El Salvador) Mauricio Quintanilla
DF	6	(El Salvador) Marcelo Messias
DF	3	(El Salvador) Edwin Martínez
DF	4	(El Salvador) Carlos Arévalo (yellow card) 74'
MF	20	(El Salvador) Héctor Salazar
MF	13	(El Salvador) Julio Martínez
MF	14	(El Salvador) Herbert Sosa	(yellow card) 9'	(substituted off) 83'
MF	12	(El Salvador) Cristian Castillo (yellow card) 60'
FW	17	(El Salvador) Carlos Ayala		(substituted off) 67'
FW	22	(El Salvador) Rodolfo Zelaya (yellow card) 66'
Substitutes:
FW	10	(Brazil) Willer Souza		(substituted on) 67'
MF	12	(El Salvador) Juan Lazo		(substituted on) 83'
Manager:
(Serbia) Miloš Miljanić

Apertura 2010 champions

5th title

== Top scorers ==
Rank	Scorer	Club	Goals
1	(El Salvador) Alexander Campos	Atlético Balboa	9
1	(El Salvador) Rodolfo Zelaya	Alianza	9
3	(Uruguay) Alcides Bandera	Atlético Marte	8
4	(Panama) Anel Canales	Isidro Metapán	7
4	(Argentina) Patricio Barroche	Águila	7
6	(El Salvador) Rafael Burgos	UES	6
6	(El Salvador) Ramiro Carballo	UES	6
6	(El Salvador) Emerson Umaña	Isidro Metapán	6
9	(El Salvador) Harold Alas	UES	5
9	(El Salvador) Christian Bautista	Atlético Balboa	5
9	(El Salvador) Léster Blanco	Isidro Metapán	5
9	(El Salvador) Mauricio Deras	Once Municipal	5
9	(El Salvador) Javier Hernandez	Vista Hermosa	5
9	(El Salvador) Gilberto Murgas	FAS	5

Updated to games played on November 28, 2010.
Post-season goals are not included, only regular season goals.

== List of foreign players in the league ==
This is a list of foreign players in Clausura 2010. The following players:

1. have played at least one apertura game for the respective club.
2. have not been capped for the El Salvador national football team on any level, independently from the birthplace

A new rule was introduced this season that clubs can only have three foreign players per club and can only add a new player if there is an injury or player/s is released.

C.D. Águila

- (Argentina) Patricio Barroche
- (Colombia) Gabriel Antero
- (Panama) Nicolás Muñoz

Alianza F.C.

- (Brazil) José Oliveira
- (Brazil) Willer Souza

Atlético Marte

- (Brazil) Glauber Da Silva
- (Uruguay) Alcides Bandera
- (Cuba) Julio Maya

Atlético Balboa

- (Colombia) Luis Torres
- (Colombia) Julián Cruz
- (Brazil) Roberto Oliveira

C.D. FAS

- (Argentina) Alejandro Bentos
- (Colombia) Rodolfo Córdoba
- (Colombia) Roberto Peña
- (Colombia) Pablo Quandt

(player released mid season)

C.D. Luis Ángel Firpo

- (Argentina) Fernando Leguizamón
- (Colombia) Hermes Martínez
- (Costa Rica) Erick Scott

A.D. Isidro Metapán

- (Honduras) Ernesto Aquino
- (Panama) Anel Canales
- (Uruguay) Paolo Suárez

Once Municipal

- (Colombia) Andres Medina
- (Colombia) Miguel Solís
- (Uruguay) Luis Espindola
- (Colombia) Elder Figueroa

UES

- (Colombia) Cristian González
- (Mexico) Manuel García
- (Paraguay) Gabriel Garcete

Vista Hermosa

- (Colombia) John Castillo
- (Colombia) Wilson Sánchez
- (Honduras) Franklin Webster
- (Brazil) Leonardo Da Silva
- (Peru) Israel Garcia
