= Juan José Gómez =

Salvadoran footballer (born 1980)

Personal information
- Full name: Juan José Gómez
- Date of birth: November 8, 1980 (age 45)
- Place of birth: San Miguel, El Salvador
- Height: 1.81 m (5 ft 11 in)
- Position: Goalkeeper

Youth career
- Deportivo Durán Turcios
- Jardínes del Río
- 1996–1998: CD Águila

Senior career*
Years	Team	Apps	(Gls)
1998–1999	→ CD Santa Clara (loan)		
1999–2000	→ Jocoro FC (loan)		
2000–2004	CD Águila		
2004–2006	San Salvador FC		
2006–2011	CD Luis Ángel Firpo		
2011–2012	Águila		
2012–2013	CD UES		
2013–2014	CD Luis Ángel Firpo		

International career
2000–2011	El Salvador	64	(0)
- * Club domestic league appearances and goals

Juan José Gómez (born November 8, 1980, in San Miguel, El Salvador) is a Salvadoran retired professional goalkeeper. He is currently working as part of a sports narration staff for the private sports channel Tigo Sports based in El Salvador.

== Club career ==
=== Águila ===
Gómez played for the reserve team at Salvadoran giants Águila, but was not given any chance to play in the first team since Raúl García and Melvin Barrera were above him in the goalkeepers pecking order.

Due to the strong competition in the goal he then turned striker and made his senior debut on loan at Santa Clara, and played for Jocoro before returning to play in goal for Águila in 2000. With the team of San Miguel Gómez won the Copa Presidente 1999–2000 (defeating Luis Ángel Firpo 3–2 in the final), also the Apertura 2000 and Clausura 2001 tournaments, suffering also a defeat in the final of the Apertura 2003.

=== San Salvador FC ===
He joined San Salvador FC in 2004, but left them for Luis Ángel Firpo in 2006.

=== Luis Ángel Firpo ===
With the team of Usulután José Gómez won two national titles: Apertura 2007 and Clausura 2008.

=== Return to Águila ===
Gómez signed again with Águila for the Apertura 2011.

In April 2012, Gómez left Águila and was reportedly looking for a job between the sticks at then bottom of the Moldovan National Division.

=== UES ===
Later, Gómez had a short step with UES, then he back to Luis Ángel Firpo on September 4, 2013.

=== Return to Luis Ángel Firpo ===
Gómez left the team after Clausura 2014 ends up with Luis Ángel Firpo descended to Segunda División.

== International career ==
Gómez made his debut for El Salvador in an August 1999 friendly match against Greece, playing as a striker, and has earned a total of 64 caps, scoring no goals.

He has represented his country in 12 FIFA World Cup qualification matches and at the 2001, 2003, 2007 and 2009 UNCAF Nations Cups as well as at the 2003 and 2007 CONCACAF Gold Cups. He also was a non-playing squad member at the 2002 CONCACAF Gold Cup.

His final international was a September 2009 FIFA World Cup qualification match against the United States. He was eventually called-up 2 years later to take part at the 2011 CONCACAF Gold Cup but did not play any minutes. On August 7, 2011, against Venezuela, J.J. Gómez was once again a starter on La Selecta. The game was won by a score of 2–1.

== Honours ==
=== Club ===
Águila

- Primera División
  - Champion: Apertura 2000, Clausura 2001
  - Runners-up: Apertura 2003

Luis Ángel Firpo

- Primera División
  - Champion: Apertura 2007, Clausura 2008
  - Runners-up: Clausura 2009
