= Ricardo Alvarado =

Salvadoran footballer (born 1980)

Personal information
- Full name: José Ricardo Alvarado Alberto
- Date of birth: May 23, 1980 (age 46)
- Place of birth: San Salvador, El Salvador
- Height: 1.78 m (5 ft 10 in)
- Position: Defender

Senior career*
Years	Team	Apps	(Gls)
1996	Municipal de San Salvador		
1997–1998	Telecom FC		
1999–2001	Coca Cola		
2002	Municipal de San Salvador		
2003–2005	Coca Cola		
2006	Independiente Nacinal 1906		
2006–2007	Platense		
2007–2013	Isidro Metapán		
2013–2015	UES		
2015–2016	Atlético Marte		

International career
2009	El Salvador	1	(0)
- * Club domestic league appearances and goals

José Ricardo Alvarado Alberto (born May 23, 1980, in San Salvador, El Salvador) is a retired Salvadoran professional footballer.

== Club career ==
=== Second Division years ===
Alvarado started his career at Municipal de San Salvador, and joined fellow capital outfit Telecom FC in 1997.

He then moved to Coca-Cola and stayed with them for seven years, experiencing their change of name to Independiente Nacional 1906 and the merger with Independiente de San Vicente, which eventually saw them clinch promotion to the Primera División de Fútbol de El Salvador in 2006.

Alvarado only made his debut at the top in El Salvador at 26 years.

=== Isidro Metapán ===
In 2007, he signed with Isidro Metapán. With Isidro Metapán, Alvarado won the Apertura 2008, Clausura 2009, Clausura 2010, Apertura 2010 and Apertura 2011. Also he lost the Clausura 2012 final against Águila.

=== UES ===
Alvarado signed with UES for the Apertura 2013. His debut was a 2–3 defeat against Isidro Metapán in the Estadio Jorge Calero Suárez. In August 2014, Alvarado scored in a 5–1 victory against Juventud Independiente in the Complejo Municipal de San Juan Opico.

In October 2014, Alvarado scored another goal in a 2–2 draw against FAS in the Estadio Óscar Quiteño.

With the scarlet team, Alvarado experienced an administrative, economic and sports crisis, with severe delays in salary payments. In March 2015, Alvarado announced that he would retire from professional football.

=== Atlético Marte ===
However, despite announcing his retirement, Alvarado signed with Atlético Marte for the Apertura 2015 tournament. With the team of San Salvador, Alvarado experienced a sports, economic and institutional crisis. In April 2016, Alvarado left the team. Atlético Marte ended up descending to Segunda División in the Clausura 2016.

== International career ==
Alvarado received his first call up to the national team in December 2008.

He officially received his first cap on February 1, 2009, in a UNCAF Nations Cup match against Honduras (0–1 defeat).

== Honours ==
- Primera División de Fútbol de El Salvador: 5

Apertura 2008, Clausura 2009, Clausura 2010, Apertura 2010, Apertura 2011
