= Manuel Luna =

Manuel Luna may refer to:

- Manuel Luna (actor) (1898-1958), Spanish actor
- Manuel Luna (judoka) (born 1945), Venezuelan judoka
- Manuel Luna (footballer) (born 1984), Mexican footballer
