= Primera División de Fútbol Profesional Apertura 2003 =

Primera División de Fútbol de El Salvador
- Champions: C.D. FAS (14 title)
- Relegated: None
- Top goalscorer: TBD (12)

The Salvadoran Primera División de Fútbol Profesional Apertura 2003 season (officially "Torneo Apertura 2003") started on August 2, 2003.

The season was composed of the following clubs:

- C.D. FAS
- Municipal Limeño
- San Salvador F.C.
- C.D. Águila
- C.D. Luis Ángel Firpo
- A.D. Isidro Metapán
- C.D. Atlético Balboa
- Alianza F.C.
- C.D. Arcense
- Chalatenango

== Team information ==
=== Personnel and sponsoring ===
Team	Chairman	Head coach	Kitmaker	Shirt sponsor
Águila	(El Salvador)	(Argentina) Hugo Coria	TBD	TBD
Alianza	(El Salvador)	(Colombia) Henry Vanegas	TBD	TBD
Atletico Balboa	(El Salvador) Noel Benítez	(Uruguay) (Armenia) Garabet Avedissian	TBD	TBD
C.D. Arcense	(El Salvador) TBD	(El Salvador) Ricardo Guardado	TBD	TBD
Chalatenango	(El Salvador) TBD	(El Salvador) Luis Roberto Hernández	TBD	TBD
FAS	(El Salvador) Reynaldo Valle	(Peru) Agustín Castillo	TBD	TBD
Firpo	(El Salvador) TBD	(Uruguay) Gustavo de Simone	TBD	TBD
Isidro Metapan	(El Salvador) José Gumercindo Landaverde	(Argentina) Raul Cocherai	TBD	TBD
Municipal Limeno	(El Salvador) Gumercindo Ventura	(El Salvador) Ruben Guevara	Galaxia	LG
San Salvador F.C.	(El Salvador) Marco Flores	(Uruguay) Ruben Alonso	TBD	TBD

== Managerial changes ==
=== Before the season ===
Team	Outgoing manager	Manner of departure	Date of vacancy	Replaced by	Date of appointment	Position in table
Aguila	(Honduras) Ramón Maradiaga	Sacked	June 2003	(Argentina) Hugo Coria	June 2003	
Atletico Balboa	(Costa Rica) Manuel Alberto Solano	TBD	June 2003	(Uruguay) (Armenia) Garabet Avedissian	June 2003	
Alianza F.C.	(Argentina) Juan Quarterone	TBD	June 2003	(Colombia) Henry Vanegas	June 2003	
Municipal Limeno	(Brazil) Antonio Carlos Viera	TBD	May 2003	(El Salvador) Ruben Guevara	June 2003	
Firpo	(Serbia and Montenegro) Milos Mijanic	TBD	June 2003	(Uruguay) Gustavo de Simone	June 2003	
Isidro Metapan	(El Salvador) Edwin Portillo	TBD	May 2003	(Argentina) Raul Cocherai	June 2003	

=== During the season ===
Team	Outgoing manager	Manner of departure	Date of vacancy	Replaced by	Date of appointment	Position in table
Atletico Balboa	(Uruguay) (Armenia) Garabet Avedissian	TBD	August 2003	(Costa Rica) Manuel Solano	September 2003	
C.D. Chalatenango	(El Salvador) Luis Roberto Hernández	TBD	September 2003	(Argentina) Juan Quarterone	September 2003	
Municipal Limeno	(El Salvador) Ruben Guevara	TBD	September 2003	(Argentina) Jorge Alberto Garcia	October 2003	
Alianza F.C.	(Colombia) Henry Vanegas	TBD	October 2003	(Argentina) Marcelo Javier Zuleta	October 2003	
C.D. Arcense	(El Salvador) Ricardo Guardado	TBD	October 2003	(El Salvador) Ricardo Mena Laguna Interim	October 2003	
C.D. Arcense	(El Salvador) Ricardo Mena Laguna Interim	TBD	October 2003	(Argentina) Raul Donsati	October 2003	
Isidro Metapan	(Argentina) Raul Cocherai	TBD	October 2003	(El Salvador) Rene Ramos	November 2003	
Atletico Balboa	(Costa Rica) Manuel Solano	TBD	November 2003	(Brazil) Paulo Roberto de Olivera	November 2003	
Isidro Metapan	(El Salvador) Rene Ramos	TBD	November 2003	(Paraguay) Nelson Brizuela	November 2003	
Atletico Balboa	(Brazil) Paulo Roberto de Olivera	TBD	November 2003	(El Salvador) Jesus Fuentes	November 2003	

== Apertura 2003 standings ==
Last updated August 2, 2003

Pos	Team	Pld	W	D	L	GF	GA	GD	Pts	Qualification
1	C.D. FAS	18	10	6	2	27	13	+14	36	Qualified for semifinal
2	C.D. Águila	18	9	4	5	38	26	+12	31	Qualified for semifinal
3	C.D. Luis Ángel Firpo	18	7	7	4	25	18	+7	28 (Note: Firpo qualified due to having best goal difference)	Qualified for semifinal
4	San Salvador F.C.	18	8	4	6	31	27	+4	28	4th place playoff
5	Alianza F.C.	18	8	4	6	26	24	+2	28	4th place playoff
6	A.D. Isidro Metapán	18	4	9	5	20	23	−3	21	
7	Municipal Limeño	18	5	5	8	27	29	−2	20	
8	C.D. Arcense	18	2	11	5	23	32	−9	17	
9	Chalatenango	18	4	5	9	13	22	−9	17	
10	C.D. Atlético Balboa	18	4	3	11	15	31	−16	15	

== 4th place playoff ==
December 3, 2003

San Salvador F.C.	2-3	Alianza F.C.

== Semifinals 1st leg ==
December 7, 2003

Alianza F.C.	0-3	C.D. FAS
		Williams Reyes 1', 46', 60' (pen.)

December 7, 2003

Firpo	1-1	Águila
Víctor Merino 2'		Alexander Amaya del Cid 51'

== Semifinals 2nd leg ==
December 13, 2003

C.D. FAS	3-2	Alianza F.C.
54' 77' 89'		59' 84'

December 14, 2003

C.D. Águila	3-1	C.D. Luis Ángel Firpo
Alexander Campos 15'; Darío Larrosa 42' 88'

== Final ==
December 21, 2003

C.D. FAS	2-2	C.D. Águila
Williams Reyes 13'; 123'		Ludwin Meraz 86'; Alexander Campos 92'
Penalties
Williams Reyes (penalty scored); Rafael Tobar (penalty scored); Gilberto Murgas (penalty scored); Emerson Umaña (penalty scored); Alfredo Pacheco (penalty scored)	5 – 3	(penalty scored) Dario Larossa; (penalty scored) Alexander Amaya Del Cid; (penalty scored) Jorge Rodriguez; (penalty missed) Alexander Campos

Estadio Cuscatlán

FAS:
GK	TBA	(El Salvador) Luís Castro
DF	TBA	(El Salvador) William Osorio
DF	TBA	(El Salvador) Rafael Tobar
DF	TBA	(El Salvador) Víctor Velásquez
DF	TBA	(El Salvador) Marvin González (red card)
MF	TBA	(El Salvador) Alfredo Pacheco
MF	TBA	(El Salvador) Gilberto Murgas
MF	TBA	(El Salvador) Cristian Álvarez	(substituted off) 84'
MF	TBA	(El Salvador) Ernesto Góchez	(substituted off) 75'
FW	TBA	(Argentina) Alejandro Bentos	(substituted off) 72'
FW	TBA	(Honduras) Williams Reyes
Substitutes:
MF	TBA	(El Salvador) Emerson Umaña	(substituted on) 72' (yellow card) 91'
FW	TBA	(Brazil) Marcelo Messias	(substituted on) 75'
FW	TBA	(El Salvador) Reina	(substituted on) 84'
Manager:
(Peru) Agustín Castillo

Aguila:
GK	TBA	(El Salvador) Juan José Gómez
DF	TBA	(El Salvador) Marvin Benitez
DF	TBA	(Uruguay) Luis Almada (yellow card) 46'
DF	TBA	(El Salvador) Jorge Rodríguez
DF	TBA	(El Salvador) Néstor Morales	(substituted off) 66'
MF	TBA	(El Salvador) Kilmar Jiménez
MF	TBA	(Uruguay) Dario Larrosa
MF	TBA	(Brazil) Anderson da Silva	(substituted off) 73' (yellow card) 30'
MF	TBA	(El Salvador) Alexander Amaya Del Cid (yellow card) 49'
FW	TBA	(El Salvador) Alexander Campos
FW	TBA	(Uruguay) Pablo Medina	(substituted off) 113'
Substitutes:
FW	TBA	(El Salvador) Ludwin Meraz	(substituted on) 66'
MF	TBA	(El Salvador) Luis Perla	(substituted on) 73'
MF	TBA	(Colombia) Julio Romaña	(substituted on) 113'
Manager:
(Argentina) Hugo Coria

Apertura 2003 champions

14th title

== List of foreign players in the league ==
This is a list of foreign players in Apertura 2003. The following players:

1. have played at least one apertura game for the respective club.
2. have not been capped for the El Salvador national football team on any level, independently from the birthplace

C.D. Águila

- (Uruguay) Dario Larrosa
- (Brazil) Anderson da Silva
- (Uruguay) Paulo Medina
- (Uruguay) Luis Almada
- (Colombia) Julio Romana

Alianza F.C.

- (Argentina) Diego De Rosa
- (Uruguay) Luis Espindola
- (Uruguay) Oscar Vallejo
- (Uruguay) Jorge Puglia
- (Uruguay) José Denis Conde

Atletico Balboa

- (Colombia) Luis Carlos Asprilla
- (Colombia) Juan Carlos Mosquera
- (Colombia) John Polo
- (Colombia) Nito Gonzales
- (Brazil) Daniel Prediguer
- (Bolivia) Enzo Calderon

Arcense

- (Argentina) Juan La Vaca
- (Argentina) Martin Uranga
- (Argentina) Victor Hugo Sanchez
- (Honduras) Jorge Wagner
- (Honduras) Mario Pavon
- (Bolivia) Hector Rojas

Chalatenango

- (Colombia) Libardo Carvajal
- (Colombia) Alexander Obregon
- (Colombia) Jorge Sandoval
- (Colombia) Henry Sevillano
- (Bolivia) Gabriel Cespedes
- (Bolivia) Adolfo Vaca

(player released mid season) (player Injured mid season) Injury replacement player

C.D. FAS

- (Argentina) Alejandro de la Cruz Bentos
- (Brazil) Marcelo Messias
- (Brazil) Felipe Ximenez
- (Colombia) Victor Hugo Mafla
- (Honduras) Williams Reyes
- (Honduras) Eduardo Arriola

C.D. Luis Ángel Firpo

- (Brazil) Paulo César Rodrigues Lima
- (Colombia) Juan Pablo Chacón
- (Colombia) Gustavo Cabrera
- (Dominican Republic) Óscar Abreu Mejía
- (Honduras) Orvin Cabrera

A.D. Isidro Metapán

- (Argentina) Diego Alvarez
- (Argentina) Gustavo Vecchiarelli
- (Colombia) Wilson Sanchez
- (Paraguay) Oswaldo Nelson Duarte

Municipal Limeno

- (Argentina) Dante Segovia
- (Argentina) Gabriel Kinjo
- (Colombia) Gerson Mier
- (Honduras) Miguel Mariano

San Salvador F.C.

- (Argentina) Rodrigo Lagos
- (Argentina) Emiliano Pedrozo
- (Colombia) Orlando Garces
- (Honduras) Franklin Webster
