= Juan Carlos Moscoso =

Salvadoran footballer (born 1982)

Personal information
- Full name: Juan Carlos Moscoso Palma
- Date of birth: May 6, 1982 (age 44)
- Place of birth: Candelaria de la Frontera, El Salvador
- Height: 1.71 m (5 ft 7 in)
- Position: Defender

Senior career*
Years	Team	Apps	(Gls)
2002–2003	CD FAS Candelareño		
2003–2004	CD FAS reserves		
2004–2015	CD FAS		
2015–2016	CD UES		
2017–2019	CD FAS	37	(0)

International career
2006–2011	El Salvador	10	(1)

Managerial career
- 2020: CD FAS (U-17)
- * Club domestic league appearances and goals

Juan Carlos Moscoso Palma (born May 6, 1982) is a former Salvadoran professional footballer who played mainly as a defender.

== Club career ==
A one-club man, Moscoso has come through the youth categories at FAS and played for the reserves before making his professional debut in July 2004 against Once Municipal.

With FAS Moscoso he had a very successful period, winning two national league titles: Clausura 2005 and Apertura 2009, in this last tournament Moscoso was the hero of the final when he scored important goal in the minute 97 against Águila in a 3–2 victory.

However, with FAS he also lost the finals of the Clausura 2006, Apertura 2006, Apertura 2007, Clausura 2008, Clausura 2011, Clausura 2013 and Apertura 2013.

In 2015, however, Moscoso signed for UES. With UES Moscoso had a very irregular performance in the two seasons that he spent with the team. The situation of UES, which was in danger of descent and with administrative problems, did not help either.

In 2017 Moscoso returned to sign for FAS. At the end of the same year, Moscoso received a tribute from the club in the Estadio Óscar Quiteño, recognizing his loyalty and his time of stay with the club of Santa Ana, prior to a game against Santa Tecla.

== International career ==
Moscoso made his debut for El Salvador in an October 2006 friendly match against Panama and has, as of January 2012, earned a total of 10 caps, scoring 1 goal.

He has represented his country in one FIFA World Cup qualification match.

=== International goals ===
#	Date	Venue	Opponent	Score	Result	Competition
1.	7 August 2009	Robertson Stadium, Houston, United States	Colombia	1–1	1–2	Friendly
