= Rodolfo Zelaya =

Salvadoran footballer (born 1988)

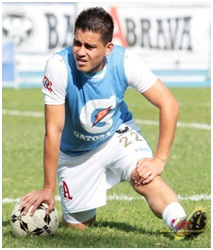
- Zelaya training with Alianza in 2014

Personal information
- Full name: Rodolfo Antonio Zelaya García
- Date of birth: 3 July 1988 (age 38)
- Place of birth: Usulután, El Salvador
- Height: 1.74 m (5 ft 9 in)
- Position: Second striker

Youth career
- 2001: CD Alacrán
- 2004: San Rafael
- 2004–2005: Atlético La Merced

Senior career*
Years	Team	Apps	(Gls)
2005–2007	Intipucá	31	(19)
2008	Chalatenango	17	(8)
2008–2009	Alianza	29	(18)
2009–2010	León	10	(1)
2010–2018	Alianza	227	(112)
2011	→ Alania Vladikavkaz (loan)	13	(3)
2013	→ Alania Vladikavkaz (loan)	3	(0)
2019	Los Angeles FC	4	(1)
2019	→ Las Vegas Lights (loan)	2	(0)
2020	Celaya	6	(2)
2020–2025	Alianza	158	(64)
Total		500	(228)

International career
2008–2019	El Salvador	52	(23)
- * Club domestic league appearances and goals

Rodolfo Antonio Zelaya García (born 3 July 1988), commonly known as Fito, is a Salvadoran former professional footballer who played as a second striker. In October 2013, Zelaya was banned from football for one year for his involvement in a match-fixing scandal with the El Salvador national team.

== Club career ==
=== San Rafael ===
Zelaya started his career playing for San Rafael in 2004, where he played for one year. The following season, he moved to Atlético La Merced.

In July 2006, both Zelaya and Rúsvel Saravia were offered contracts to play for one of El Salvadors biggest clubs, Águila. Unfortunately for both Zelaya and Saravia, they could not come to terms with the club over their proposed salaries, and as a result, the transfer fell through.

=== Intipucá ===
Zelaya then moved on to play in Segunda División with Intipucá. After 2 years with the club, Zelaya caught the attention of Chalatenango coach Vladan Vićević.

=== Chalatenango ===
After meeting with Vićević, Zelaya was offered, and accepted a contract to play with his first Primera División club Chalatenango. Zelaya went on to impress in his first season with the club and grew a fan base with both spectators and reporters for being one of El Salvador's most promising young strikers.

Chalatenango finished in fifth place in the league table with 25 points. Zelaya scored 8 goals at the end of the Clausura 2008.

=== Alianza ===
In 2008, Zelaya moved to Alianza after former Chalatenango president Lisandro Pohl switched clubs. This switch lead to Pohl taking various players with him to Alianza whose rights he supposedly owned due to them being bought when he was president at Chalatenango.

=== Mexico ===
On 15 June 2009, Zelaya was one of the three Salvadoran footballers signed to Mexican club León on a loan deal, the other two were Cristian Castillo and Julio Enrique Martínez. On 3 December 2009, it was announced that Club León had permanently signed Zelaya along with the other two Salvadorans with a three-year contract.

On 12 December 2009, it was confirmed by Alianza's own president, Lisandro Pohl, that Zelaya would return to Alianza on a loan deal. Zelaya later played without a loan deal and participated at the Clausura 2011, where he was top goalscorer with 13 goals to his part.

He also had the opportunity to reign champion and score 2 goals at the final to give his team the tournament.

=== Russia ===
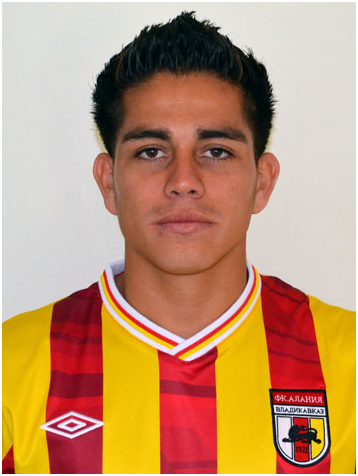
Zelaya in Alania Vladikavkaz in 2011

On 19 July 2011, Zelaya signed with Russian First Division club Alania Vladikavkaz on a loan transfer for six months. Alania may be able to redeem his transfer by January 2012.

On 9 August 2011, Zelaya debuted at the Russian league championship in a match against Torpedo Vladimir as a starter. On 4 November, he scored two goals against Mordovia Saransk, but also received a knee injury that would rule him out for 7 months. During the summer of 2012, Alania decided not to keep him and sent him back to Alianza.

On 26 January 2013, he once again signed a six-month loan to rejoin Alania Vladikavkaz, who had been promoted to the Russian Premiere League.

He was sent back to Alianza in June after his contract expired.

=== Return to Alianza ===
In June 2014, Zelaya signed again with Alianza.

Zelaya scored four goals in a 7–0 victory against Chalatenango in the second leg of the quarterfinals of the Apertura 2018, at the Estadio Cuscatlán, in December 2018. Alianza reached the semi-finals.

=== Los Angeles FC ===
On 30 January 2019, it was announced that Zelaya would join Major League Soccer club Los Angeles FC. In January 2020, the club announced that it and Zelaya had mutually agreed to part ways.

==== Las Vegas Lights (loan) ====
On 15 August 2019, Zelaya was loaned to USL Championship side Las Vegas Lights FC.

==== Retirement ====
On January 24, 2025 a day after Alianza announced the mutual parting ways, Zelaya announced he would retire from professional football. He will be leaving as Alianza F.C. all time goal scorer with 176 goals in 385 games, he holds the club record most goal in a final series with 32 goals, hold the club record most individual goalscoring titles with 5 and won 8 club titles.

== International career ==
Zelaya officially received his first cap on 23 April 2008, in a friendly match against China.

He scored his first goal with the national team on 6 September 2008, in a 2010 FIFA World Cup qualification match against Haiti. This game also saw him score his first hat-trick which lead El Salvador to a 5–0 win against the then Caribbean Nations Cup champions.

At the 2011 CONCACAF Gold Cup, Zelaya received two trophies for the best player in the matches against Cuba and Panama. Overall, Zelaya scored 4 goals being the second top goalscorer of the tournament.

Zelaya was noted by Goal.com as being one of the Best XI of the 2011 CONCACAF Gold Cup — alongside Javier Hernández as forwards. CONCACAF also noted "Fito" scoring the fifth best goal of the tournament, a decent feat considering 80 goals scored in the tournament.

According to IFFHS (International Federation of Football History & Statistics) Rodolfo Zelaya was one of the most skilled and popular Central American players of 2012. After being out of action for almost a year due to injury Zelaya, was selected to represent El Salvador for the 2013 CONCACAF Gold Cup scoring all four goals for the team leading them to the Quarter-finals, as well as being named one of the best players of the tournament.

Scoring two goals versus Trinidad & Tobago, one goal versus Haiti, and versus United States, several critics said that Zelaya was the only player that makes a big difference in the field, due to his dribbling skills and ability to score.

In September 2013, Zelaya was handed a one-year ban from international football for his involvement in a match-fixing scandal with the El Salvador national football team. This ban was extended to worldwide in October of the same year.

== Career statistics ==
=== Club ===
As of match played 4 September 2016

Appearances and goals by club, season and competition
Club	Season	League			National cup		Continental		Total	
Club	Season	Division	Apps	Goals	Apps	Goals	Apps	Goals	Apps	Goals
Alianza	2009–2010	Salvadoran Primera División	14	5	0	0	–		14	5
Alianza	2010–2011	Salvadoran Primera División		26	0	0	–			26
Alianza	2011–2012	Salvadoran Primera División	0	0	0	0	–		0	0
Alianza	2012–2013	Salvadoran Primera División	10	4	0	0	–		10	4
Alianza	2013–2014	Salvadoran Primera División	3	0	0	0	–		3	0
Alianza	Total			35	0	0	0	0		35
Alania Vladikavkaz (loan)	2011–12	Russian National League	13	3	0	0	2	0	15	3
Alania Vladikavkaz (loan)	2012–13	Russian Premier League	1	0	0	0	–		1	0
Alianza	2014–2015	Salvadoran Primera División	25	4	0	0	–		25	4
Alianza	2015–16	Salvadoran Primera División	40	15	0	0	–		40	15
Alianza	2016–17	Salvadoran Primera División	6	1	0	0	2	0	8	1
Alianza	Total		71	20	0	0	2	0	73	20
Career total			85	23	0	0	4	0	89	23

=== International ===
As of match played 12 October 2019

Appearances and goals by national team and year
National team	Year	Apps	Goals
El Salvador	2008	10	4
El Salvador	2009	12	0
El Salvador	2010	2	2
El Salvador	2011	7	7
El Salvador	2012	1	0
El Salvador	2013	5	4
El Salvador	2014	0	0
El Salvador	2015	0	0
El Salvador	2016	0	0
El Salvador	2017	11	4
El Salvador	2018	0	0
El Salvador	2019	4	2
Total		52	23

Scores and results list El Salvador's goal tally first, score column indicates score after each Zelaya goal.

List of international goals scored by Rodolfo Zelaya
No.	Date	Venue	Opponent	Score	Result	Competition
1	6 September 2008	Estadio Cuscatlán, San Salvador, El Salvador	Haiti	1–0	5–0	2010 FIFA World Cup qualification
2	6 September 2008	Estadio Cuscatlán, San Salvador, El Salvador	Haiti	2–0	5–0	2010 FIFA World Cup qualification
3	6 September 2008	Estadio Cuscatlán, San Salvador, El Salvador	Haiti	3–0	5–0	2010 FIFA World Cup qualification
4	15 October 2008	Estadio Cuscatlán, San Salvador, El Salvador	Suriname	1–0	3–0	2010 FIFA World Cup qualification
5	4 September 2010	Los Angeles Memorial Coliseum, Los Angeles, United States	Honduras	1–0	2–2	Friendly
6	4 September 2010	Los Angeles Memorial Coliseum, Los Angeles, United States	Honduras	2–0	2–2	Friendly
7	29 May 2011	Robertson Stadium, Houston, United States	Honduras	1–2	2–2	Friendly
8	9 June 2011	Bank of America Stadium, Charlotte, United States	Costa Rica	1–0	1–1	2011 CONCACAF Gold Cup
9	12 June 2011	Soldier Field, Chicago, United States	Cuba	1–0	6–1	2011 CONCACAF Gold Cup
10	12 June 2011	Soldier Field, Chicago, United States	Cuba	4–0	6–1	2011 CONCACAF Gold Cup
11	19 June 2011	Robert F. Kennedy Memorial Stadium, Washington, D.C., United States	Panama	1–0	1–1	2011 CONCACAF Gold Cup
12	2 September 2011	Estadio Cuscatlán, San Salvador, El Salvador	Dominican Republic	1–0	3–2	2014 FIFA World Cup qualification
13	2 September 2011	Estadio Cuscatlán, San Salvador, El Salvador	Dominican Republic	3–1	3–2	2014 FIFA World Cup qualification
14	8 July 2013	Red Bull Arena, Harrison, United States	Trinidad and Tobago	1–1	2–2	2013 CONCACAF Gold Cup
15	8 July 2013	Red Bull Arena, Harrison, United States	Trinidad and Tobago	2–1	2–2	2013 CONCACAF Gold Cup
16	15 July 2013	BBVA Compass Stadium, Houston, United States	Haiti	1–0	1–0	2013 CONCACAF Gold Cup
17	21 July 2013	M&T Bank Stadium, Baltimore, United States	United States	1–2	1–5	2013 CONCACAF Gold Cup
18	15 January 2017	Estadio Rommel Fernández, Panama City, Panama	Honduras	1–0	1–2	2017 Copa Centroamericana
19	22 March 2017	Stadion dr. Antoine Maduro, Willemstad, Curaçao	Curaçao	1–1	1–1	Friendly
20	27 May 2017	Robert F. Kennedy Memorial Stadium, Washington, D.C., United States	Honduras	2–2	2–2	Friendly
21	13 July 2017	Sports Authority Field at Mile High, Denver, United States	Curaçao	2–0	2–0	2017 CONCACAF Gold Cup
22	12 October 2019	Blakes Estate Stadium, Lookout, Montserrat	Montserrat	2–0	2–0	2019–20 CONCACAF Nations League B
23	15 October 2019	Darren Sammy Cricket Ground, Gros Islet, Saint Lucia	Saint Lucia	1–0	2–0	2019–20 CONCACAF Nations League B

== Honors ==
Alianza

- Primera División Winners (4): Clausura 2011, Apertura 2015, Apertura 2017, Clausura 2018

Individual

- Alania Vladikavkaz Player of the Year – 2011
- Univision Goal of the Year – 2011
- CONCACAF Gold Cup Best XI – 2011, 2013
