= 2010 FIFA World Cup qualification – CONCACAF fourth round =

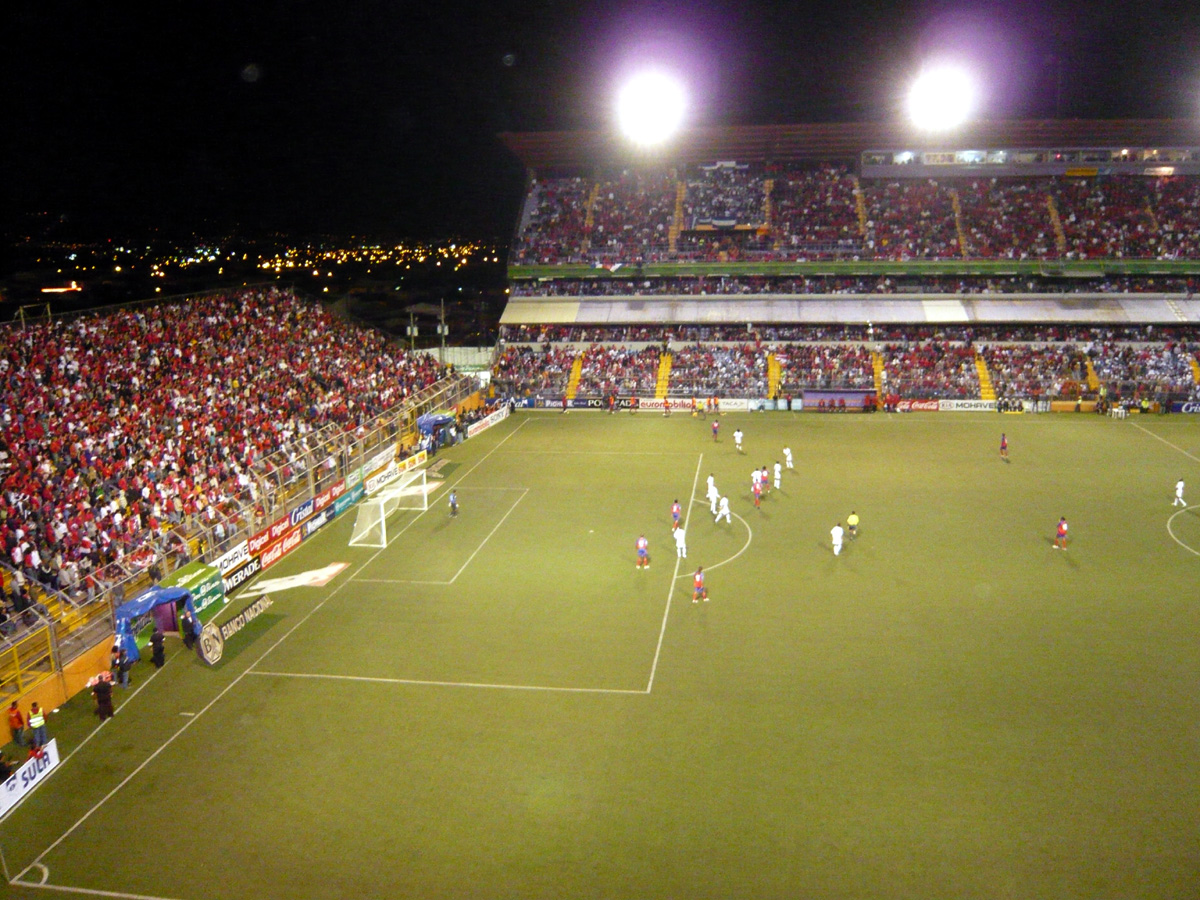
Costa Rica facing Honduras during the first matchday of the round

This page provides the summaries of the CONCACAF fourth round, often referred to as "the hexagonal" or "the hex", matches for the 2010 FIFA World Cup qualification. The three group winners and three runners-up from the third round contest this round.

== Format ==
In this round, the group winners and runners-up from the third round formed a single double-round-robin, home-and-away group. The top three teams qualified for the 2010 FIFA World Cup. The fourth place team competed in a home-and-away play-off against the fifth-place team from CONMEBOL.

== Standings ==
Pos	Team	Pld	W	D	L	GF	GA	GD	Pts	Qualification	(United States)	(Mexico)	(Honduras)	(Costa Rica)	(El Salvador)	(Trinidad and Tobago)
1	United States	10	6	2	2	19	13	+6	20	Qualification to 2010 FIFA World Cup	—	2–0	2–1	2–2	2–1	3–0
2	Mexico	10	6	1	3	18	12	+6	19	Qualification to 2010 FIFA World Cup	2–1	—	1–0	2–0	4–1	2–1
3	Honduras	10	5	1	4	17	11	+6	16	Qualification to 2010 FIFA World Cup	2–3	3–1	—	4–0	1–0	4–1
4	Costa Rica	10	5	1	4	15	15	0	16	Advance to inter-confederation play-offs	3–1	0–3	2–0	—	1–0	4–0
5	El Salvador	10	2	2	6	9	15	−6	8		2–2	2–1	0–1	1–0	—	2–2
6	Trinidad and Tobago	10	1	3	6	10	22	−12	6		0–1	2–2	1–1	2–3	1–0	—

== Results ==
The allocation of teams in the draw took place in Johannesburg, South Africa on 22 November 2008.

11 February 2009
19:00 UTC-5

United States	2–0	Mexico
Bradley 43', 90+2'	Report

Columbus Crew Stadium, Columbus
Attendance: 23,776
Referee: Carlos Batres (Guatemala)
11 February 2009
19:00 UTC-6

El Salvador	2–2	Trinidad and Tobago
Romero 82', 90+3'	Report	Edwards 7'; Yorke 26' (pen.)

Estadio Cuscatlán, San Salvador
Attendance: 25,000
Referee: Marco Antonio Rodríguez (Mexico)
11 February 2009
20:30 UTC-6

Costa Rica	2–0	Honduras
Furtado 48', 59'	Report

Estadio Ricardo Saprissa Aymá, San José
Attendance: 18,000
Referee: Joel Aguilar (El Salvador)

28 March 2009
17:00 UTC-6

Mexico	2–0	Costa Rica
Bravo 20'; Pardo 52' (pen.)	Report

Estadio Azteca, Mexico City
Attendance: 90,000
Referee: Terry Vaughn (United States)
28 March 2009
19:00 UTC-4

Trinidad and Tobago	1–1	Honduras
Hyland 90'	Report	Pavón 51'

Hasely Crawford Stadium, Port of Spain
Attendance: 23,500
Referee: Wálter Quesada (Costa Rica)
28 March 2009
19:00 UTC-6

El Salvador	2–2	United States
Quintanilla 15'; Castillo 72'	Report	Altidore 77'; Hejduk 88'

Estadio Cuscatlán, San Salvador
Attendance: 30,350
Referee: Benito Archundia (Mexico)

1 April 2009
18:45 UTC-5

United States	3–0	Trinidad and Tobago
Altidore 13', 71', 89'	Report

LP Field, Nashville
Attendance: 27,959
Referee: Roberto Moreno (Panama)
1 April 2009
19:30 UTC-6

Honduras	3–1	Mexico
Costly 17', 79'; Pavón 43'	Report	Castillo 82' (pen.)

Estadio Olímpico Metropolitano, San Pedro Sula
Attendance: 28,000
Referee: Paul Ward (Canada)
1 April 2009
20:00 UTC-6

Costa Rica	1–0	El Salvador
Centeno 69'	Report

Estadio Ricardo Saprissa Aymá, San José
Attendance: 19,200
Referee: Jair Marrufo (United States)

3 June 2009
20:00 UTC-6
(Note: Moved from original date of 10 June 2009 due to the United States' participation in the 2009 FIFA Confederations Cup.)

Costa Rica	3–1	United States
Saborío 2'; Borges 13'; Herrera 69'	Report	Donovan 90+2' (pen.)

Estadio Ricardo Saprissa Aymá, San José
Attendance: 19,200
Referee: Neal Brizan (Trinidad and Tobago)

6 June 2009
18:05 UTC-4

Trinidad and Tobago	2–3	Costa Rica
Edwards 29'; Samuel 63'	Report	Saborío 40'; Borges 52', 68'

Dwight Yorke Stadium, Bacolet
Attendance: 8,000
Referee: Courtney Campbell (Jamaica)
6 June 2009
19:30 UTC-5

United States	2–1	Honduras
Donovan 43' (pen.); Bocanegra 68'	Report	Costly 5'

Soldier Field, Chicago
Attendance: 55,647
Referee: Mauricio Morales (Mexico)
6 June 2009
19:00 UTC-6

El Salvador	2–1	Mexico
Martínez 11'; Quintanilla 86' (pen.)	Report	Blanco 71' (pen.)

Estadio Cuscatlán, San Salvador
Attendance: 33,000
Referee: Wálter Quesada (Costa Rica)

10 June 2009
19:30 UTC-6

Honduras	1–0	El Salvador
Pavón 13'	Report

Estadio Olímpico Metropolitano, San Pedro Sula
Attendance: 28,000
Referee: Baldomero Toledo (United States)
10 June 2009
20:30 UTC-5

Mexico	2–1	Trinidad and Tobago
Franco 2'; Rojas 48'	Report	Tinto 45+1'

Estadio Azteca, Mexico City
Attendance: 92,000
Referee: José Pineda (Honduras)

12 August 2009
15:00 UTC-5

Mexico	2–1	United States
Castro 19'; Sabah 82'	Report	Davies 9'

Estadio Azteca, Mexico City
Attendance: 104,499
Referee: Roberto Moreno (Panama)
12 August 2009
19:30 UTC-4

Trinidad and Tobago	1–0	El Salvador
Glen 7'	Report

Hasely Crawford Stadium, Port of Spain
Attendance: 25,784
Referee: Terry Vaughn (United States)
12 August 2009
19:30 UTC-6

Honduras	4–0	Costa Rica
Costly 30', 90+2'; Pavón 51'; M. Valladares 89'	Report

Estadio Olímpico Metropolitano, San Pedro Sula
Attendance: 30,000
Referee: Marco Antonio Rodríguez (Mexico)

5 September 2009
18:00 UTC-6

United States	2–1	El Salvador
Dempsey 41'; Altidore 45+2'	Report	Castillo 32'

Rio Tinto Stadium, Sandy
Attendance: 19,066
Referee: José Pineda (Honduras)
5 September 2009
19:00 UTC-6

Honduras	4–1	Trinidad and Tobago
Pavón 20', 28'; Guevara 62'; Suazo 83'	Report	Baptiste 86'

Estadio Olímpico Metropolitano, San Pedro Sula
Attendance: 38,000
Referee: Mark Geiger (United States)
5 September 2009
20:00 UTC-6

Costa Rica	0–3	Mexico
	Report	Dos Santos 45+1'; Franco 62'; Guardado 71'

Estadio Ricardo Saprissa Aymá, San José
Attendance: 20,000
Referee: Neal Brizan (Trinidad and Tobago)

9 September 2009
19:11 UTC-4

Trinidad and Tobago	0–1	United States
	Report	Clark 62'

Hasely Crawford Stadium, Port of Spain
Attendance: 4,700
Referee: Joel Aguilar (El Salvador)
9 September 2009
19:00 UTC-6

El Salvador	1–0	Costa Rica
Corrales 90+1'	Report

Estadio Cuscatlán, San Salvador
Attendance: 18,000
Referee: Benito Archundia (Mexico)
9 September 2009
20:00 UTC-5

Mexico	1–0	Honduras
Blanco 76' (pen.)	Report

Estadio Azteca, Mexico City
Attendance: 97,897
Referee: Courtney Campbell (Jamaica)

10 October 2009
17:00 UTC-5

Mexico	4–1	El Salvador
González 25' (o.g.); Blanco 71'; Palencia 85'; Vela 90'	Report	Martínez 89'

Estadio Azteca, Mexico City
Attendance: 104,000
Referee: Carlos Batres (Guatemala)
10 October 2009
20:00 UTC-6

Costa Rica	4–0	Trinidad and Tobago
James 26' (o.g.); Centeno 51'; Saborío 61', 64'	Report

Estadio Ricardo Saprissa Aymá, San José
Attendance: 10,000
Referee: Jair Marrufo (United States)
10 October 2009
20:00 UTC-6

Honduras	2–3	United States
de León 47', 78'	Report	Casey 55', 66'; Donovan 71'

Estadio Olímpico Metropolitano, San Pedro Sula
Attendance: 37,000
Referee: Roberto Moreno (Panama)

14 October 2009
18:05 UTC-6

El Salvador	0–1	Honduras
	Report	Pavón 64'

Estadio Cuscatlán, San Salvador
Attendance: 28,000
Referee: Ricardo Salazar (United States)
14 October 2009
20:05 UTC-4

Trinidad and Tobago	2–2	Mexico
Baptiste 23' (pen.), 61'	Report	Esqueda 57'; Salcido 65'

Hasely Crawford Stadium, Port of Spain
Attendance: 2,000
Referee: Wálter Quesada (Costa Rica)
14 October 2009
20:05 UTC-4

United States	2–2	Costa Rica
Bradley 72'; Bornstein 90+5'	Report	Ruiz 21', 24'

Robert F. Kennedy Memorial Stadium, Washington
Attendance: 26,243
Referee: Benito Archundia (Mexico)

== Goalscorers ==
There were 88 goals scored in 30 matches, for an average of 2.93 goals per match.

7 goals

- (Honduras) Carlos Pavón

5 goals

- (Honduras) Carlo Costly
- (United States) Jozy Altidore

4 goals

- (Costa Rica) Álvaro Saborío

3 goals

- (Costa Rica) Celso Borges
- (Mexico) Cuauhtémoc Blanco
- (Trinidad and Tobago) Kerry Baptiste
- (United States) Michael Bradley
- (United States) Landon Donovan

2 goals

- (Costa Rica) Walter Centeno
- (Costa Rica) Andy Furtado
- (Costa Rica) Bryan Ruiz
- (El Salvador) Cristian Castillo
- (El Salvador) Julio Martínez
- (El Salvador) Osael Romero
- (El Salvador) Eliseo Quintanilla
- (Honduras) Julio César de León
- (Mexico) Guillermo Franco
- (Trinidad and Tobago) Carlos Edwards
- (United States) Conor Casey

1 goal

- (Costa Rica) Pablo Herrera
- (El Salvador) Rudis Corrales
- (Honduras) Amado Guevara
- (Honduras) David Suazo
- (Honduras) Melvin Valladares
- (Mexico) Omar Bravo
- (Mexico) Nery Castillo
- (Mexico) Israel Castro
- (Mexico) Giovani dos Santos
- (Mexico) Enrique Esqueda
- (Mexico) Andrés Guardado
- (Mexico) Francisco Palencia
- (Mexico) Pável Pardo
- (Mexico) Óscar Rojas
- (Mexico) Miguel Sabah
- (Mexico) Carlos Salcido
- (Mexico) Carlos Vela
- (Trinidad and Tobago) Cornell Glen
- (Trinidad and Tobago) Khaleem Hyland
- (Trinidad and Tobago) Collin Samuel
- (Trinidad and Tobago) Hayden Tinto
- (Trinidad and Tobago) Dwight Yorke
- (United States) Carlos Bocanegra
- (United States) Jonathan Bornstein
- (United States) Ricardo Clark
- (United States) Charlie Davies
- (United States) Clint Dempsey
- (United States) Frankie Hejduk

1 own goal

- (El Salvador) Marvin González (against Mexico)
- (Trinidad and Tobago) Julius James (against Costa Rica)

== Attendances ==
Team	Highest	Lowest	Average
Costa Rica	20,200	10,000	17,280
El Salvador	33,350	17,992	26,870
Honduras	38,000	28,000	33,760
Mexico	104,500	90,000	97,679
Trinidad and Tobago	25,784	2,000	12,797
United States	55,647	19,066	30,538
