= Julio Martínez (footballer, born 1985) =

Salvadoran footballer

Personal information
- Full name: Julio Enrique Martínez Rivera
- Date of birth: 8 July 1985 (age 41)
- Place of birth: Coatepeque, El Salvador
- Height: 1.85 m (6 ft 1 in)
- Position: Right winger

Senior career*
Years	Team	Apps	(Gls)
2003	Once Lobos		
2003–2009	Isidro Metapán	103	(10)
2009	Alianza	0	(0)
2009	→ Club León (loan)	7	(3)
2009–2010	Club León	0	(0)
2010	→ Chicago Fire (loan)	3	(1)
2010	→ Alianza (loan)	12	(1)
2011	Alianza	12	(0)
2012	Isidro Metapán	32	(0)
2013	Santa Tecla	16	(3)
2013	Águila	17	(3)

International career
2006–2013	El Salvador	14	(2)
- * Club domestic league appearances and goals as of 21 April 2011

Julio Enrique Martínez Rivera (born 8 July 1985) is a retired Salvadoran footballer who last played for Águila and internationally for the El Salvador national team.

== Club career ==
=== León ===
On 15 June 2009, Martínez was one of three Salvadoran footballers signed to the Mexican club Club León on a loan deal from Alianza; the other two were Rodolfo Zelaya and Cristian Castillo.

On 3 December 2009, it was announced that Club León had permanently signed Martínez along with the other two Salvadorans to a three-year contract. However, shortly afterwards, it was announced that Martínez along with the other two Salvadorans would no longer be part of the team for the moment. It was explained that the three foreign player spots allowed for the club had already been taken by other new signings.

=== Chicago Fire ===
On 21 January 2010, new Chicago Fire and former El Salvador coach Carlos de los Cobos signed Martínez to Chicago Fire on loan from León. On 30 June 2010, Martínez was released by the Chicago Fire.

=== Return to Alianza ===
Prior to returning to Alianza for the Apertura 2010, Martínez had signed with the club in 2009. However, he never managed to make his debut with the squad after he was sent to the Mexican Club León on a loan basis shortly following the announcement of his signing. After the season ended, Club León decided to permanently sign Martínez along with Cristian Castillo and Rodolfo Zelaya, who were also on loan with the Mexican club at the time. For the Apertura 2010, Martínez reunited with two of his former teammates (Castillo) and (Zelaya) who have all previously played at Alianza.

== International career ==
Martínez is a member of the El Salvador national team, having made his debut in an October 2006 friendly match against Panama. He was part of the El Salvador squads which took part in the 2007 and 2009 CONCACAF Gold Cups, and, as of July 2011, he has earned 13 caps and scored two international goals, both in qualifying for the 2010 FIFA World Cup, and both against Mexico.

== Career statistics ==
=== International ===
Appearances and goals by national team and year
National team	Year	Apps	Goals
El Salvador	2006	1	0
El Salvador	2007	2	1
El Salvador	2008	–	
El Salvador	2009	8	2
El Salvador	2010	2	0
El Salvador	2011	–	
El Salvador	2012	–	
El Salvador	2013	1	0
Total		14	2

Scores and results list El Salvador's goal tally first, score column indicates score after each Martínez goal.

List of international goals scored by Julio Martínez
No.	Date	Venue	Opponent	Score	Result	Competition
1	6 June 2009	Cuscatlán Stadium, San Salvador, El Salvador	Mexico	1–0	2–1	2010 FIFA World Cup qualification
2	10 October 2009	Estadio Azteca, Mexico City, Mexico	Mexico	1–3	1–4	2010 FIFA World Cup qualification

== Honours ==
=== Isidro Metapán ===
- Primera División:
  - Winner (3): Clausura 2007, Apertura 2008, Clausura 2009
