= Alexander Campos =

Salvadoran footballer (born 1980)

Personal information
- Full name: Juan Alexander Campos Hernández
- Date of birth: May 8, 1980 (age 46)
- Place of birth: La Morita, San Miguel, El Salvador
- Height: 1.75 m (5 ft 9 in)
- Position: Forward

Senior career*
| Years | Team | Apps | (Gls) |
| 1999–2002 | Los Andes | | |
| 2002–2003 | Jocoro | | |
| 2003–2008 | Águila | | |
| 2008 | Alianza | | |
| 2009–2010 | Luis Ángel Firpo | | |
| 2010–2011 | Atlético Balboa | | |
| 2011–2012 | Once Municipal | | |
| 2012 | UES | | |
| 2013 | Juventud Independiente | | |
| 2013–2014 | Dragón | | |
| 2014 | Topiltzín | | |
| 2015 | Pasaquina | | |
| 2016 | Dragón | | |
| 2016 | Luis Ángel Firpo | | |
| 2016 | Pasaquina | | |
| 2017–2018 | Jocoro | | |

International career
| 2003–2007 | El Salvador | 23 | (0) |
- * Club domestic league appearances and goals

Juan Alexander Campos Hernández (born May 8, 1980) is a Salvadoran professional football player.

== Club career ==
=== Águila ===
Nicknamed El Murciélago (the Bat), Campos started his career at Tercera División club Los Andes, then had a spell at Jocoro, before making his Primera División debut for Águila in 2003. He immediately became the league top scorer with 13 goals in his first season.

One of his most important moments with the team of San Miguel came during the Clausura 2006 final against FAS, in that game Campos scored a goal against the Santa Ana team, helping Águila to win his 14th title, under the coaching of Serbian Vladan Vićević.

With Águila he also lost the final of the Apertura 2003.

=== Alianza ===
He joined Alianza in 2008, only to leave them for Luis Ángel Firpo after inexplicably failing to turn up for training with Alianza.

=== Luis Ángel Firpo ===
Campos signed with Luis Ángel Firpo for the Apertura 2009, reaching the semi-finals of that tournament, before being eliminated 0–3 by Águila on aggregate.

=== Atlético Balboa ===
In 2010, he signed with Atlético Balboa. With the team of La Unión, Campos became the top scorer of the Apertura 2010 with 9 goals, beating other scorers like Rodolfo Zelaya and Anel Canales.

=== Once Municipal ===
In the Apertura 2011, Campos signed with Once Municipal. With the team of Ahuachapán reached the final of that tournament, but they were defeated by Isidro Metapán. Campos played the final as substitute.

=== UES ===
He signed with UES for the Apertura 2012.

=== Juventud Independiente ===
Campos signed with Juventud Independiente for the Clausura 2013.

=== Dragón ===
In December 2013, he signed with Dragón.

=== Topiltzín ===
In 2014, he signed with Topiltzín.

=== Pasaquina ===
Campos signed with Pasaquina for the Clausura 2015. Later, at the Apertura 2015, Campos played 11 games and could not finish his contract for a year with Pasaquina after being fired by the directive. However, Campos filed a lawsuit.

=== Return to Dragón ===
Before starting the Clausura 2016, Campos played with Dragón some friendly matches during the pre-season.

=== Return to Luis Ángel Firpo ===
In 2016, he joined to Luis Ángel Firpo of Segunda División.

=== Return to Pasaquina ===
Campos played with Pasaquina for the Apertura 2016. He scored the only goal in a 1–0 victory against Municipal Limeño at the Estadio San Sebastián.

=== Jocoro ===
In 2017, Campos signed with Jocoro.

== International career ==
Campos made his debut for El Salvador national team in a February 2003 UNCAF Nations Cup match against Panama and has earned a total of 23 caps, scoring no goals. He has represented his country in only 1 FIFA World Cup qualification match and played at the 2003 and 2005 UNCAF Nations Cups and at the 2003 and 2007 CONCACAF Gold Cups.

His final international game was a June 2007 CONCACAF Gold Cup match against the United States.
