= Pablo Hütt =

Mexican footballer (born 1989)

Personal information
- Full name: Pablo Hütt García
- Date of birth: 25 March 1989 (age 37)
- Place of birth: Léon, Mexico
- Height: 1.88 m (6 ft 2 in)
- Position: Midfielder

Senior career*
Years	Team	Apps	(Gls)
2004–2006	Club América		
2007–2009	Atlante		
2009	Dorados		
2010	Morelia		
2010–2011	CSD Municipal	14	(2)
2011–2012	Once Municipal	33	(5)
2012–2014	Cruz Azul Hidalgo	28	(7)
2015	Veracruz	3	(0)
2015–2016	Chalatenango		
2016–2017	Potros UAEM		
- * Club domestic league appearances and goals

Pablo Hütt García (born 25 March 1989) is a Mexican professional footballer who played as a midfielder.

== Career ==
Hütt started his career at Mexican lower division side Club América before joining Atlante with whom he clinched promotion to the top tier of Mexican football. He then played for Dorados and Morelia.

He spent one year at CSD Municipal of the Guatemalan First Division, and made one late substitute appearance for the club in a 2010-11 CONCACAF Champions League Group Stage loss against Santos Laguna.
