= Osael Romero =

Salvadoran footballer (born 1986)

Personal information
- Full name: William Osael Romero Castillo
- Date of birth: 18 April 1986 (age 40)
- Place of birth: Usulután, El Salvador
- Height: 1.68 m (5 ft 6 in)
- Positions: Midfielder; attacking midfielder

Senior career*
Years	Team	Apps	(Gls)
2006	Atlético Chaparratique		
2006–2010	Vista Hermosa	115	(26)
2010	→ Chivas USA (loan)	9	(1)
2011–2012	Águila	72	(24)
2013	Alianza	23	(8)

International career^{‡}
2004–2005	El Salvador U-20		
2007–2013	El Salvador	77	(16)
- * Club domestic league appearances and goals as of 1 March 2014 ‡ National team caps and goals as of 7 September 2012

William Osael Romero Castillo (born 18 April 1986) is a Salvadoran former professional footballer. He was banned for life in 2013, for match fixing while playing for the El Salvador national football team.

== Career ==
=== Club ===
Romero started his career at Atlético Chaparratique before joining Vista Hermosa in 2006.

On 1 February 2010, Chivas USA signed El Salvador international from FC Dallas who held a discovery claim on the player, the 23-year-old midfielder arrived in Los Angeles and comes on loan from Vista Hermosa. On 26 June 2010, Romero scored his first MLS goal with Chivas USA in a game against FC Dallas at The Home Depot Center, which ended 1–2 in favor of FC Dallas.

He returned to his home country to join Águila for the 2010 Apertura.

=== International ===
Romero officially received his first cap on 13 October 2007 in a friendly match against Costa Rica. He scored his first goal for the national team on 22 October 2008 in a friendly match against Bolivia. Arguably, Romero's greatest moment to date as a Salvadoran international came on 11 February 2009 in a World Cup qualification match against Trinidad and Tobago when he scored two late goals from free kicks in the dying moments of the game to even the scores and save El Salvador from a disappointing home loss. The game ended at 2–2. During the 2009 Gold Cup, Romero scored two goals against Costa Rica that gave El Salvador a victory over traditional rivals Costa Rica.

As of February 2012, he has represented his country in 19 FIFA World Cup qualification matches and played at the 2009 and 2011 UNCAF Nations Cups as well as at the 2009 and 2011 CONCACAF Gold Cups.

On 20 September 2013, Romero was one of 14 Salvadoran players banned for life due to their involvement with match fixing.

==== International goals ====
Goal	Date	Venue	Opponent	Score	Result	Competition
1.	22 October 2008	RFK Stadium, Washington, D.C., United States	Bolivia	2–0	2–0	Friendly
2.	6 February 2009	Los Angeles Memorial Coliseum, Los Angeles, United States	Peru	1–0	1–0	Friendly
3.	11 February 2009	Estadio Cuscatlán, San Salvador, El Salvador	Trinidad and Tobago	1–2	2–2	2010 FIFA World Cup qualification
4.	11 February 2009	Estadio Cuscatlán, San Salvador, El Salvador	Trinidad and Tobago	2–2	2–2	2010 FIFA World Cup qualification
5.	27 May 2009	Los Angeles Memorial Coliseum, Los Angeles, United States	Ecuador	1–1	3–1	Friendly
6.	27 May 2009	Los Angeles Memorial Coliseum, Los Angeles, United States	Ecuador	3–1	3–1	Friendly
7.	3 July 2009	The Home Depot Center, Carson, United States	Costa Rica	0–1	2–1	2009 CONCACAF Gold Cup
8.	3 July 2009	The Home Depot Center, Carson, United States	Costa Rica	1–2	2–1	2009 CONCACAF Gold Cup
9.	16 January 2011	Estadio Rommel Fernández, Panama City, Panama	Belize	1–0	5–2	2011 Copa Centroamericana
10.	12 June 2011	Soldier Field, Chicago, United States	Cuba	2–0	6–1	2011 CONCACAF Gold Cup
11.	7 October 2011	Estadio Olímpico Félix Sánchez, Santo Domingo, Dominican Republic	Dominican Republic	1–0	2–1	2014 FIFA World Cup qualification
12.	15 November 2011	Estadio Cuscatlán, San Salvador, El Salvador	Suriname	1–0	4–0	2014 FIFA World Cup qualification
13.	15 November 2011	Estadio Cuscatlán, San Salvador, El Salvador	Suriname	2–0	4–0	2014 FIFA World Cup qualification
14.	8 June 2012	Estadio Nacional de Costa Rica, San José, Costa Rica	Costa Rica	2–2	2–2	2014 FIFA World Cup qualification
15.	7 September 2012	Estadio Cuscatlan, San Salvador, El Salvador	Guyana	2–1	2–2	2014 FIFA World Cup qualification
16.	11 September 2012	Providence Stadium, Providence, Guyana	Guyana	1–1	3–2	2014 FIFA World Cup qualification

== Awards ==
Achievement	Club	Season
Primera División	C.D. Vista Hermosa	2005

=== Individual achievement ===
Award	Year
Top Scorer Primera División FESFUT (15 goles)	2009
Player of the Year Primera División FESFUT	2006–2010
