= Leonardo da Silva (footballer) =

Brazilian footballer

Personal information
- Date of birth: February 18, 1987 (age 39)
- Place of birth: Brazil
- Height: 1.83 m (6 ft 0 in)
- Position: Forward

Youth career
- Years: Team
- 2000–2001: América de Brasil
- 2002: Paulista
- 2003–2005: Londrina
2007	Castelo Branco		
2008	Botafogo		
2009	Resende		
2009–2011	Vista Hermosa	23	(11)
2011–2012	Alianza	17	(7)
2012	Isidro Metapán	16	(4)
2013	TTM FC		
2013	URT		
2014	Valério		
2015	Castelo Branco		
2016–2017	Araguaia		

Leonardo da Silva (born February 18, 1987) is a Brazilian former professional footballer who played as a forward.

== Career ==
=== Vista Hermosa ===
In 2009, Da Silva signed with Vista Hermosa of El Salvador.

On 6 July 2010, Vista Hermosa released him from his contract after he failed to return from his vacation in Brazil. However midway through the season Vista Hermosa recalled him back to join the squad again.

=== Alianza ===
He was released from Vista Hermosa after the Clausura 2011 tournament and joined Alianza for the Apertura 2011.

=== Isidro Metapán ===
Da Silva signed with Isidro Metapán in 2012, reaching the Clausura 2012 final, but they were defeated by Águila.
