= Paolo Suárez =

Uruguayan footballer (born 1980)

Personal information
- Full name: Rodolfo Paolo Suárez Díaz
- Date of birth: 6 June 1980 (age 46)
- Place of birth: Montevideo, Uruguay
- Height: 1.74 m (5 ft 9 in)
- Positions: Midfielder; striker

Senior career*
Years	Team	Apps	(Gls)
1996–2000	Basañez	22	(13)
2001	Deportivo Maldonado	1	(5)
2002–2003	Basañez	41	(11)
2003	Club Santa Fe	8	(2)
2004	Basañez	20	(11)
2005–2006	A.D. Isidro Metapán		
2005–2007	C.D. FAS	34	(11)
2007–2008	A.D. Isidro Metapán		
2008–2009	Fénix		
2010–2016	A.D. Isidro Metapán	72	(22)
2013–2015	→ Comunicaciones (loan)	104	(22)
2016–2017	C.D. Sonsonate	39	(3)
2017–2019	A.D. Isidro Metapán	68	(11)

International career
1999	Uruguay U20	15	(5)
- * Club domestic league appearances and goals

Rodolfo Paolo Suárez Díaz (born 6 June 1980) is a Uruguayan-Salvadoran former professional footballer who played as a midfielder.

He is the eldest brother of footballer Luis Suárez, who plays for Inter Miami and the Uruguay national team.

== Club career ==
Suárez was born in Montevideo. He played his 200th game in the round 15 match of the Salvadoran League against Once Municipal, having made his debut in 2005 against San Salvador F.C.

He has a strong relationship with his brother and is in regular contact with him.

In January 2013, Suárez signed for Guatemalan side Comunicaciones, on a one-year-long loan deal, which triggered a clause on his contract with parent club A.D. Isidro Metapán, which extended his deal for one year.

On 2016, Suárez moved to Primera Division newcomer C.D. Sonsonate. He played 1 seasons and left the club. He returned to Isidro Metapán in 2017.

Suárez announced his retirement from football in May 2018, he played 368 games and 73 goals in the primera division of El Salvador, he won twelve domestic titles; 7 with Isidro Metapan and 5 with Comunicaciones.

== Honours ==
C.D. FAS

- Salvadoran Primera División runner-up: Apertura 2006

A.D. Isidro Metapán

- Salvadoran Primera División (7): Clausura 2007, Apertura 2008, Clausura 2009, Clausura 2010, Apertura 2010, Apertura 2011, Apertura 2012; runner-up Apertura 2005

Comunicaciones

- Liga Nacional de Guatemala: 2012 Apertura, 2013 Clausura, 2013 Apertura
