= Christian Castillo (footballer) =

Salvadoran footballer (born 1984)

Personal information
- Full name: Christian Giovanni Castillo Martínez
- Date of birth: August 23, 1984 (age 42)
- Place of birth: San Salvador, El Salvador
- Height: 1.72 m (5 ft 8 in)

Senior career*
Years	Team	Apps	(Gls)
2002–2006	Telecom		
2006–2008	Chalatenango	49	(3)
2008–2009	Alianza	34	(3)
2009	→ Club León (loan)	15	(1)
2009–2011	Club León	19	(3)
2010	→ D.C. United (loan)	10	(0)
2010	→ Alianza (loan)	13	(2)
2011–2013	Alianza	53	(6)
2013	Suphanburi FC	9	(2)
2013	Luis Ángel Firpo	4	(0)
2014–2015	Zeravani	26	(4)

International career^{‡}
2008–2013	El Salvador	47	(3)
- * Club domestic league appearances and goals as of May 12, 2013 ‡ National team caps and goals as of September 7, 2010

Christian Giovanni Castillo Martínez (born August 25, 1984, in San Salvador) is a Salvadoran footballer. He was banned for life in 2013 for match-fixing while playing for the El Salvador national football team. After being banned, he played for Zeravani SC in the Iraqi Premier League, a league unsanctioned by FIFA.

== Club career ==
=== Telecom & early career ===
Castillo began his professional career in 2002 at the age of 18, when he signed with the now defunct Segunda División club C.D. Telecom.

=== Chalatenango ===
After spending four years with the San Salvador side, Castillo then transferred to C.D. Chalatenango for the 2006 Apertura season.

He made his Primera División debut on August 20, 2006, in a league match against C.D. Águila. Castillo's speed, ball control and exciting dribbling skills quickly made him somewhat of a fan favourite, but his first season with his new club saw him play most games off the bench. The following season things got worse for Castillo when he suffered an injury that led to him only being able to play one game the entire tournament. After having to watch most of the entire season from the sidelines, Castillo returned for the following season. This time he was able to prove himself and was consistently part of the club's starting eleven. This season also saw him score his first Primera División goal; it came on September 30, 2007, in a league match against Nejapa F.C.

=== Alianza ===
Controversially, Castillo then transferred to Alianza F.C. for the 2008 Apertura season, after the then C.D. Chalatenango club president Lisandro Pohl left the club and took all the players that he had helped to sign with him. After much dispute, it was decided that Castillo and the other players that Pohl had signed were eligible to transfer and they all officially became Alianza F.C. players.

At Alianza F.C., Castillo continued to impress and most importantly improved his game to become one of the most, if not the most important players at the club. He scored his first goal with his new club on November 26, 2008, in a league match against C.D. Águila. After being released from D.C. United before the end of the 2010 season, Castillo returned to Alianza for the Apertura 2010. On October 21, 2012, Castillo played his 100th game for Alianza in their 2-0 loss against Metapan .

=== León ===
On 15 June 2009, Castillo was one of the three Salvadoran footballers signed to Mexican club, Club León on a loan basis, the other two were Rodolfo Zelaya and Julio Enrique Martínez. On 3 December 2009, it was announced that Club León had permanently signed Castillo along with the other two Salvadorans with a three-year contract.

=== D.C. United ===
Castillo joined Major League Soccer side D.C. United on loan for the 2010 MLS season. On June 29, 2010, he was released by the club after a fall out over contract terms and left the club. He made a total of 10 league games with the club, and scored one goal in a U.S. Open Cup match against FC Dallas.

=== Suphanburi F.C. ===
In February 2013, Castillo decided to try a big leap. After bittersweet negotiations with Lisandro Pohl, Alianza F.C.owner, he rescinded his contract calling a clause that allowed him to transfer to Suphanburi F.C. of the Thai Premier League, and signed a contract for one year within an option for one more year, leaving Alianza F.C. in amicable terms.

After nine games, he terminated his contract and returned to El Salvador to sign with Luis Angel Firpo.

=== Zeravani SC ===
In September 2014, thanks to the Iraqi Premier League not being recognised by FIFA, Castillo and his fellow banned Salvadoran teammate José Henríquez joined Zeravani SC.

== International career ==
Castillo officially received his first cap on April 23, 2008, in a friendly match against China. He scored his first goal for the national team on August 14, 2008, in a friendly match against Trinidad and Tobago. His second goal came almost eight months later on March 28, 2009, when he scored in a World Cup qualification match against the USA. His third goal came six months later on September 5, once again, against USA with a header above U.S goalkeeper Tim Howard.

In August, Castillo was one of 22 players suspended by El Salvador's football federation pending an investigation into match-fixing. On September 20, 2013, Castillo and 13 other members of the Salvadoran team were banned for life for match fixing.

== Career statistics ==
=== International ===
Appearances and goals by national team and year
National team	Year	Apps	Goals
El Salvador	2008	14	1
El Salvador	2009	18	2
El Salvador	2010	3	0
El Salvador	2011	2	0
El Salvador	2012	6	0
El Salvador	2013	4	0
Total		47	3

Scores and results list El Salvador's goal tally first, score column indicates score after each Castillo goal.

List of international goals scored by Christian Castillo
No.	Date	Venue	Opponent	Score	Result	Competition
1	14 August 2008	RFK Stadium, Washington, D.C., United States	Trinidad and Tobago	1–0	1–3	Friendly
2	28 March 2009	Estadio Cuscatlán, San Salvador, El Salvador	United States	2–0	2–2	2010 FIFA World Cup qualification
3	5 September 2009	Rio Tinto Stadium, Sandy, United States	United States	1–0	1–2	2010 FIFA World Cup qualification
