= Julián Cruz =

Colombian footballer (born 1987)

Personal information
- Full name: Julián Andres Cruz Sánchez
- Date of birth: February 15, 1987 (age 39)
- Place of birth: Popayán, Colombia
- Height: 1.73 m (5 ft 8 in)
- Position: Forward

Team information
- Current team: ADI F.C.
- Number: 11

Senior career*
Years	Team	Apps	(Gls)
2000–2005	Independiente de Popayán		
2005–2010	Millonarios		
2010–2011	Atlético Balboa		
2011–	ADI		
- * Club domestic league appearances and goals as of January 2007 ‡ National team caps and goals as of February 2007

Julián Andres Cruz Sánchez (born February 15, 1987) is a Colombian footballer who currently plays for ADI F.C. in El Salvador.
