= Léster Blanco =

Salvadoran footballer (born 1989)

Personal information
- Full name: Mark Léster Blanco Pineda
- Date of birth: January 17, 1989 (age 37)
- Place of birth: Soyapango, El Salvador
- Height: 1.77 m (5 ft 10 in)
- Position: Forward

Youth career
- 1997–2004: Fútbol Blanco Sport

Senior career*
Years	Team	Apps	(Gls)
2004–2005	CD Atlético Marte		
2005–2006	Telecom FC		
2006–2009	Nejapa FC		
2008–2009	→ CD Chalatenango (loan)		
2009–2010	CD Atlético Marte		
2010–2013	AD Isidro Metapán		
2012	→ Kongsvinger (loan)	9	(0)
2012–2013	→ Marathón (loan)	14	(6)
2013–2014	→ Real España (loan)	10	(3)
2014	CD Luis Ángel Firpo	17	(4)
2014	CD FAS	18	(2)
2014–2015	CD Atlético Marte	29	(8)
2016	Santa Tecla FC	45	(12)
2017	→ AD San Carlos (loan)	8	(1)
2018	Liga de Loja		
2018	AD Isidro Metapán	9	(0)
2019	Deportivo Iztapa	21	(3)
2019	Jicaral	3	(0)
2020–2021	Phrae United	33	(11)
2021–2022	Nakhon Pathom United	10	(1)
2022	Aguila	7	(0)
2022	Sukhothai FC	6	(1)
2023	North Bangkok University	14	(3)

International career
2008–2009	El Salvador U20	6	(3)
2010–2011	El Salvador U21		
2011–2012	El Salvador U23	6	(4)
2007–2014	El Salvador	36	(5)
- * Club domestic league appearances and goals as of 7 May 2023 (UTC)

Mark Léster Blanco Pineda (born January 17, 1989, in Soyapango, El Salvador) is a Salvadoran professional footballer who plays as a forward.

== Club career ==
Blanco came through the youth ranks at the Fútbol Blanco Sport, and made his debut at Second Division side Atlético Marte in 2004. After a year and another at Telecom, he joined Nejapa and later moved on to Chalatenango on loan before returning to Atlético Marte. He joined Isidro Metapán for the Clausura 2010.

Blanco was crucial in the Clausura 2010 final of the Primera División de Fútbol de El Salvador, when he scored two of the three goals to give Isidro Metapán their fourth title in its history.

He was on a trial with Norwegian club Kongsvinger in January 2012, and the club wanted to sign Blanco. However, nothing happened until the Norwegian transfer window closed on 31 March, but Kongsvinger announced on 30 May that Blanco would join them on loan from 1 August until the end of the season in November. The club was close to bankruptcy and was not able to sign Lester on a permanent deal.

On January 2, he signed for a season loan with Real Madrid. He spent the 2012–13 clasura with them.

After he signed another loan deal with Real España. He returned to El Salvador to sign with Luis Ángel Firpo at the end of the season. In July 2014, Blanco signed with FAS for the Apertura 2014.

== International career ==
Blanco made his debut for El Salvador in an October 2007 friendly match against Costa Rica.

Léster Blanco scored his first goal with El Salvador on March 29, 2011, in a 2–3 loss against Jamaica.

Léster Blanco played in the "2011 CONCACAF Gold Cup Tournament" and scored one goal in that event, in a 6–1 victory against Cuba.

On October 7, 2011, Léster Blanco scored a goal that led to a 2–1 victory against Dominican Republic. On November 2, Léster Blanco scored two goals in Suriname's home territory, giving the salvadorans a 1–3 victory.

On March 24, 2012, Léster Blanco scored a goal in an Under 23 victory 4–0 match against Cuba in minute '4 in the game. Léster Blanco scored against USA in an Under 23 match, leaving USA eliminated in the Pre-olympic tournament.

== Honors ==
=== Club ===
Santa Tecla

- Primera División de Fútbol de El Salvador (La Primera) Winner (1): Apertura 2016

Metapan

- La Primera Winner (2): Clausura 2010, Apertura 2010

Real C.D. España

- Liga Nacional de Honduras Winner (1): Apertura 2013

North Bangkok University

- Thai League 3 Bangkok Metropolitan Region (1): 2022–23
