= Emerson Umaña =

Salvadoran footballer (born 1981)

Personal information
- Full name: Emerson David Umaña Corleto
- Date of birth: November 12, 1981 (age 44)
- Place of birth: San Vicente, El Salvador
- Height: 1.63 m (5 ft 4 in)
- Position: Midfielder

Senior career*
| Years | Team | Apps | (Gls) |
| 1996–2000 | Independiente | | |
| 2001 | Dragón | | |
| 2001–2003 | Telecom | | |
| 2003–2009 | FAS | 129 | (21) |
| 2009–2011 | Isidro Metapán | | |
| 2011–2012 | Águila | | |
| 2012–2013 | Santa Tecla | | |
| 2015 | Independiente | | |

International career
| 2005–2008 | El Salvador | 10 | (1) |

Managerial career
- 2017–2018: Audaz (assistant and under 17 coach)
- 2018: Audaz (assistant / interim manager)
- * Club domestic league appearances and goals

Emerson David Umaña Corleto (born November 12, 1981) is a Salvadoran former professional footballer who played as a midfielder.

== Club career ==
Umaña was born in San Vicente, El Salvador. He started his career at hometown club Independiente in the Salvadoran second division before a stint at Dragón in 2001. He then joined another second level team, Telecom, whom he left for top level FAS in 2003. He won three league titles while with FAS and after six years he moved on to Isidro Metapán before signing up with Águila for the 2011 Apertura season.

== International career ==
Umaña made his debut for El Salvador in a February 2005 UNCAF Nations Cup match against Panama and has earned a total of 10 caps, scoring 1 goal. He has represented his country in three FIFA World Cup qualification matches and played at the 2005 UNCAF Nations Cup,

His final international game was a July 2008 friendly match against Guatemala.

== Career statistics ==
Scores and results list El Salvador's goal tally first.

| # | Date | Venue | Opponent | Score | Result | Competition |
|---|---|---|---|---|---|---|
| 1 | 6 February 2008 | Estadio Cuscatlán, San Salvador, El Salvador | Anguilla | 11-0 | 12-0 | 2010 FIFA World Cup qualification |
