= Raphael Alves =

Brazilian footballer (born 1990)

Personal information
- Full name: Raphael Alves da Silva
- Date of birth: 9 September 1990 (age 36)
- Place of birth: São Paulo, Brazil
- Height: 1.90 m (6 ft 3 in)
- Position: Midfielder

Youth career
- São Caetano

Senior career*
Years	Team	Apps	(Gls)
2009	São Caetano		
2010	Grêmio Maringá		
2010–2011	Wikki Tourists		
2011	UES		
2012	IFK Ölme	19	(5)
2012–2013	Zawisza Rzgów	11	(2)
2013	São Caetano		
2014	Matonense		
2015	IFK Ölme		
2015	UES		
- * Club domestic league appearances and goals

Raphael Alves da Silva (born 9 September 1990), also known as Raphael Alves, is a Brazilian former professional footballer who played as a midfielder.

== Club career ==
=== UES ===
In 2011, he signed with UES of the Salvadoran Primera División.

=== Return to UES ===
Da Silva signed again for UES in the Apertura 2015 tournament. However, with the scarlet team he barely played and left the team months later in the midst of a sports, economic and financial crisis.
