= Alejandro Bentos =

Argentine footballer (born 1978)

Personal information
- Full name: Alejandro de La Cruz Bentos
- Date of birth: May 3, 1978 (age 48)
- Place of birth: Corrientes, Argentina
- Height: 1.75 m (5 ft 9 in)
- Position: Forward

Senior career*
Years	Team	Apps	(Gls)
1996–1997	Guaraní Antonio Franco		
1998–1999	Huracán de Corrientes		
1999–2000	Puente Seco de Corrientes		
2000–2001	Club Atlético Huracán		
2001	CD Morón		
2001–2009	CD FAS		
2005–2006	→ Puebla FC (loan)	29	(14)
2009	Nejapa FC	16	(2)
2009–2015	CD FAS	127	(19)
2016	Leones de Occidente	3	(1)
- * Club domestic league appearances and goals

Alejandro de la Cruz Bentos (born May 3, 1978) is an Argentine former professional footballer who played as a forward.

== Career ==
=== Guaraní Antonio Francor ===
Bentos started out his career with Guaraní Antonio Franco in his native town of Corrientes in 1996.

=== Puente Seco de Corrientes ===
In 1999, he was part of Puente Seco de Corrientes title winning team. Due to his success with the club, he moved on to play with Deportivo Morón.

=== FAS ===
In 2001, he moved to El Salvador to play with one of the country biggest clubs, FAS. During his time with the Santa Ana club, he would go on to play an integral part in the club winning the league title 5 times from 2002 to 2005.

=== Loan to Puebla FC ===
He became a very consistent player and was named one of El Salvador's Most Valuable Players. Due to this, he received interest to play for various clubs outside of El Salvador, and in 2005, he was loaned to Puebla of Mexico. During his time at Puebla, he was part of the team that won the Primera A title.

=== Return to FAS ===
Personally though, Bentos saw little game time, and as a result, he soon returned to FAS. He continued to play there until December 2008, when he was released from the club due to poor performances and demanding to high a wage.

=== Nejapa FC ===
On December 19, he signed a six-month contract with Nejapa. For the Apertura 2009 season, he returned to FAS.

In 2011, Bentos reached 300 games playing in the Salvadoran Primera División.

== Honours ==
FAS

- Salvadoran Primera División: Clausura 2002, Apertura 2002, Apertura 2003, Apertura 2004, Clausura 2005, Apertura 2009; runner-up Clausura 2001, Clausura 2004, Apertura 2007, Clausura 2008, Clausura 2011, Clausura 2013, Apertura 2013
