= Márcio Teruel =

Brazilian footballer

Marcio Teruel
Personal information
- Date of birth: 11 March 1986 (age 40)
- Place of birth: São Paulo, Brazil
- Height: 1.76 m (5 ft 9 in)
- Position: Midfielder

Youth career
- 1999–2003: Mogi Mirim

Senior career*
Years	Team	Apps	(Gls)
2003–2005	Mogi Mirim	?	(?)
2005–2007	Barueri		
2007	Roma		
2008	Grêmio Osasco		
2009	Mogi Mirim		
2010	Glória		
2011–2012	FAS	42	(8)
2012–2013	Jagodina	2	(0)
2013	Vittoriosa Stars	12	(1)
2014	Inter de Limeira	6	(0)
2014–2015	FAS	12	(6)
2016	Sitra Club		
2016	Arema Cronus	5	(0)
2018	LDU Loja		
- * Club domestic league appearances and goals

Márcio Teruel (born 11 March 1986) is a Brazilian former professionalfootballer who played as a midfielder.

== Career ==
Teruel started his career in 1999 when he joined the youth team of Mogi Mirim. He became senior in 2003, and had played with Mogi Mirim in the Campeonato Paulista and the Campeonato Brasileiro Série B. He left Mogi Mirim in 2005 and joined Barueri playing with them in the Campeonato Brasileiro Série C. While with Barueri, he also played in the Copa São Paulo de Juniores and in the Copa Federação Paulista. In 2007, he moved to another Série C side, Roma from Apucarana. Then he played in 2008 with Paulistão second level side Grêmio Osasco, before returning in 2009 to Mogi Mirim playing in the Campeonato Paulista. In 2010, he joined Glória from Vacaria and played in the second level of the Campeonato Gaúcho.

In 2011, he made a move abroad, joining Salvadoran side C.D. FAS. He played with FAS in the Salvadoran Primera División having scored 10 goals between 2011 and 2012. Those good exhibitions made him a move to Europe, and on 28 July 2012 he signed a 2-year contract with Serbian side FK Jagodina.

During summer 2013 he left Serbia and joined Maltese Premier League side Vittoriosa Stars but during winter break he returned to Brazil joining Inter de Limeira.

In 2016, he played the spring with Sitra Club in 2015–16 Bahrain First Division League and then in summer joined Arema Cronus playing in the Indonesian Liga 1. In 2018 he further had a spell in Ecuador with L.D.U. Loja.

== Honours ==
Jagodina

- Serbian Cup: 2013
