= Tigo El Salvador =

Mobile phone service provider

Telemovil, El Salvador S.A.
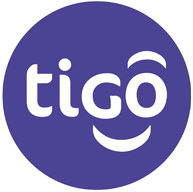
- Tigo Logo
- Type: Owned by MIC
- Industry: Wireless Services
- Founded: 1992; 34 years ago (as Telemovil S.A.); 2003 (as Tigo)
- Headquarters: Luxembourg
- Products: TDMA, GSM, SMS, MMS, Wap Tigo(GPRS), EDGE
- Website: TIGO El Salvador

TIGO El Salvador is a mobile phone service provider company owned by the international mobile phone company Millicom International Cellular or just MIC. In 2003 Telemovil changed its name to TIGO.

There are also other TIGO's in Latin America, in the Central American countries of Guatemala, Honduras, Nicaragua, Panamá and also in the South American nations of Bolivia, Colombia, Paraguay and Uruguay.

TIGO Colombia is the biggest subsidiary of TIGO in the world with a base of 3 million subscribers

In El Salvador's competitive mobile phone market TIGO's main rivals are:

- The Spanish movistar
- The Mexican Claro
- The Caribbean Digicel
- The American RED (this one does not offer GSM services. Just iDEN)

TIGO offers the following cellphone brands in El Salvador.

- Alcatel
- i-mate
- LG
- Motorola
- Nokia
- SAMSUNG
- Siemens
- Sony Ericsson
- Palm Treo
- VK Mobile

Tigo Money

El Salvador has access to Tigo Money, an electronic wallet that allows users to carry out transactions such as sending and receiving money, paying utility bills, remittances, making payments at different businesses, loans, and recharging Tigo packages. You can register by downloading the Tigo Money app or from the Tigo Money web https://tigomoney.com/sv/home-sv

== See also ==
All the MIC services as Tigo in Latin America

- El Salvador TIGO SV
- Guatemala TIGO GT
- Honduras TIGO HN
- Colombia TIGO CO
- Paraguay TIGO PY
- Bolivia TIGO BO
