= John Castillo (footballer) =

Colombian footballer (born 1983)

Personal information
- Full name: John Eider Castillo Diago
- Date of birth: September 21, 1983 (age 43)
- Place of birth: Colombia
- Position: Forward

Senior career*
Years	Team	Apps	(Gls)
2001–2002	Atlético Huila		
2003	FBC Melgar		
2004–2007	Cortuluá		
2007–2009	Dragón		
2009–2011	Vista Hermosa		
2011	Alianza	7	(0)
2012	UES	14	(2)
2012–2013	Sacachispas		
2013	Deportivo Iztapa	8	(2)
2014	Platense		
- * Club domestic league appearances and goals as of 13 August 2011

John Eider Castillo Diago (born September 21, 1983) is a Colombian footballer who currently plays for UES in El Salvador.
