= Sergio Torres Stadium =

Multi-purpose stadium in Usulután, El Salvador

Coordinates: 13°20′59″N 88°26′16″W

Estadio Sergio Torres Rivera
- La Caldera del Diablo "The Devil's Cauldron"
- Interactive map of Estadio Sergio Torres Rivera
- Former names: Usulután Stadium
- Location: Usulután, El Salvador
- Owner: Dirigencía de Luis Ángel Firpo
- Capacity: 10,000
- Surface: Grass

Construction
- Built: 1930
- Cost: $80,000

Tenant
- Luis Ángel Firpo

Sergio Torres Stadium (Spanish: Estadio Sergio Torres) is a multi-purpose stadium in Usulután, El Salvador. It is currently used mostly for football matches and is the home stadium of Luis Ángel Firpo football club. The stadium holds 10,000 people.

== History ==
Located in the Barrio La Parroquia, the stadium is an exception in El Salvador's professional soccer, as it is the only stadium in the country that is owned by the sports club (LA Firpo). Most clubs in El Salvador are owned by either the local department or INDES (the National Institute of Sports of El Salvador). Firpo's first president, Mr. Gustavo Dennys, bought two thirds of the stadium and, In 1950, the then president, Mr. Juan Boillat, bought the other third. A curious note: Between 1960 and 1970 Mr. Gilberto Napoleon Flores Huezo, one of Firpo's higher ups, made an effort to remodel the stadium's walls and seats, but, it would seem, at the expense of the team - Firpo, in those same years, was going up and down between the First and Second Division .

== Name ==
In 1997, The stadium was renamed after the legendary former owner and president of the team—the stadium known as Usulután Stadium became known as Sergio Torres Rivera Stadium in Usulután.
