= Manuel Luna (footballer) =

Mexican footballer (born 1984)

Personal information
- Full name: Manuel Luna García
- Date of birth: January 11, 1984 (age 42)
- Place of birth: Mexico City, Mexico
- Position: Forward

Senior career*
Years	Team	Apps	(Gls)
- Azucareros de Córdoba
- Halcones de Orizaba
2008	Chalatenango		
2010	UES		
- * Club domestic league appearances and goals

Manuel Luna García (born January 11, 1984) is a Mexican retired professional footballer.

== Club career ==
Luna has played in the Mexican second division as well as in El Salvador for UES.
