= Usulután =

- District
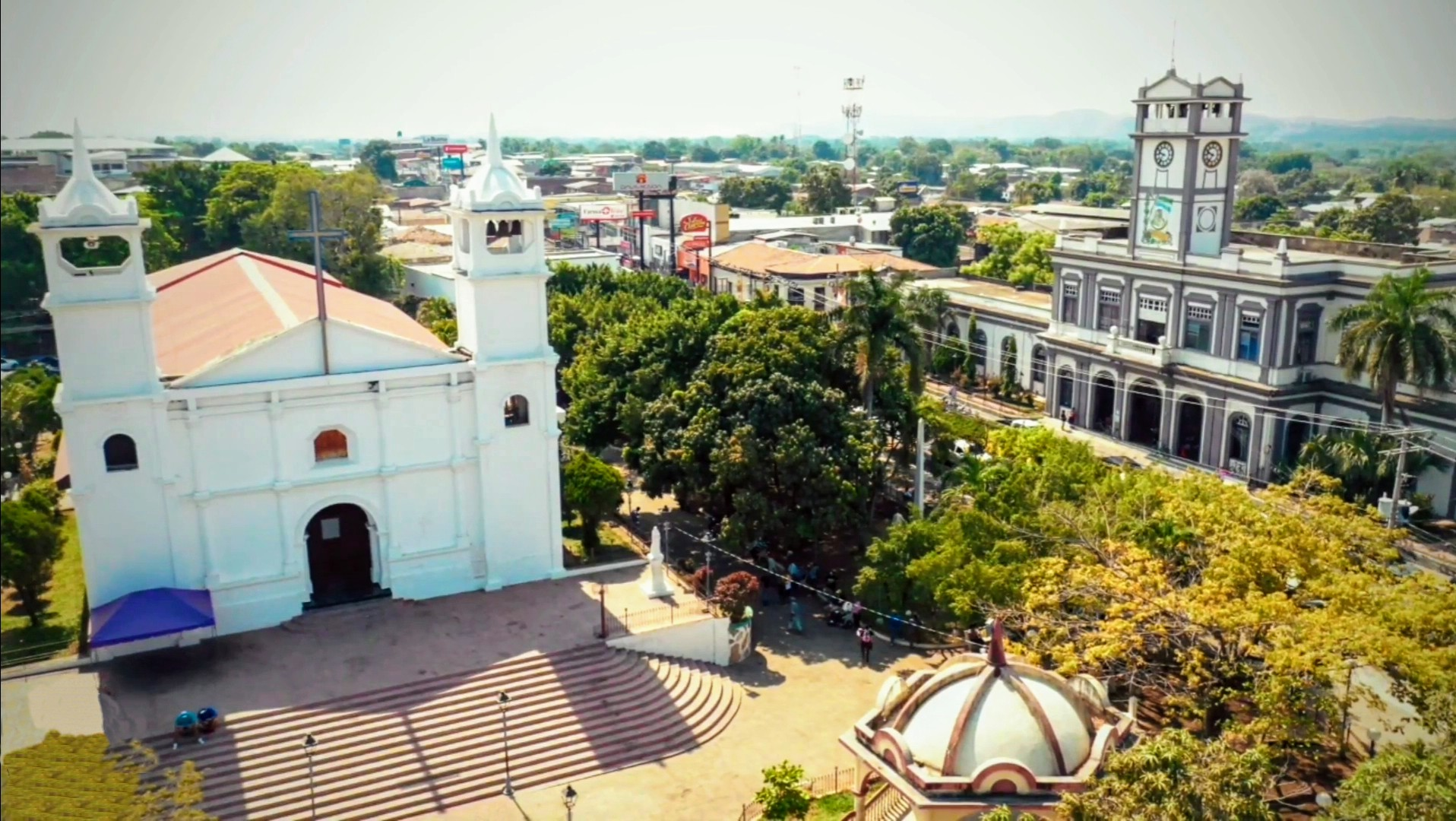
- Central Park in Usulután

- Location in El Salvador
- Coordinates: 13°20′45″N 88°25′23″W
- Country: El Salvador
- Department: Usulután Department

Area
  - District: 139.75 km^{2} (53.96 sq mi)
- Elevation: 90 m (300 ft)

Population (2024)
  - District: 66,125
  - Rank: 19th in El Salvador; 8th (Agglomeration)
  - Density: 473.17/km^{2} (1,225.5/sq mi)
  - Urban: 64,355
  - Urban (District): 51,977
- Time zone: UTC-6

Usulután (Spanish pronunciation: [usuluˈtan]) is the fifth largest city in El Salvador, and capital of the Usulután Department in the south-east of El Salvador.

As of 2006, it is estimated to have population of 71,636 people. Usulután rests in a rich agricultural valley and has very high and humid temperatures most of the year as it is located close to the Pacific Ocean. The city was badly damaged by the Salvadorian earthquakes of February 2001, in addition to Hurricane Mitch in 1998.

The main Catholic Church of the town is located in a park area next to the Town Hall (Alcaldia) and next to the Cine Centenario (a cinema) which are roughly located at the center of the town. Recently, Usulután has modernized considerably, having more influence from brand names and eateries that were not available there in the past.

== Sport ==
It is home to one of the most successful soccer clubs in the country C.D. Luis Ángel Firpo, who play at Sergio Torres Stadium. Sergio Torres Stadium is the only stadium in the country that is fully owned by the soccer club. The local teams' colors are white, red and Blue. They play in the Salvadoran League, The Primera División of the Liga de Fútbol Profesional.

== Notable people ==
- Schafik Handal, politician
- Elías Antonio Saca González, politician, Salvadoran president (2004-2009)
- Álvaro Torres, musician
- Rodolfo Zelaya, former professional footballer
- Osael Romero, football player
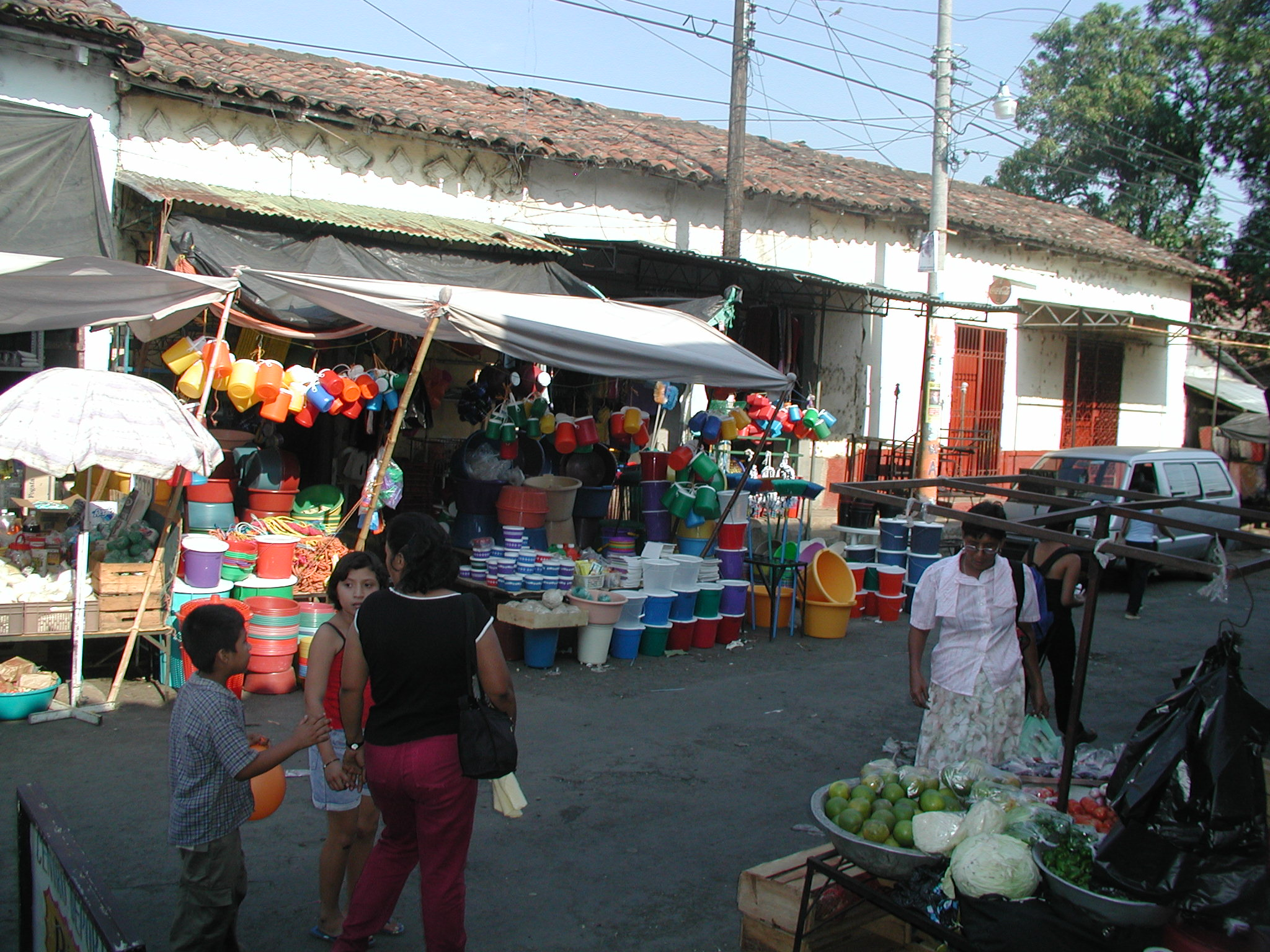
A market in Usulután

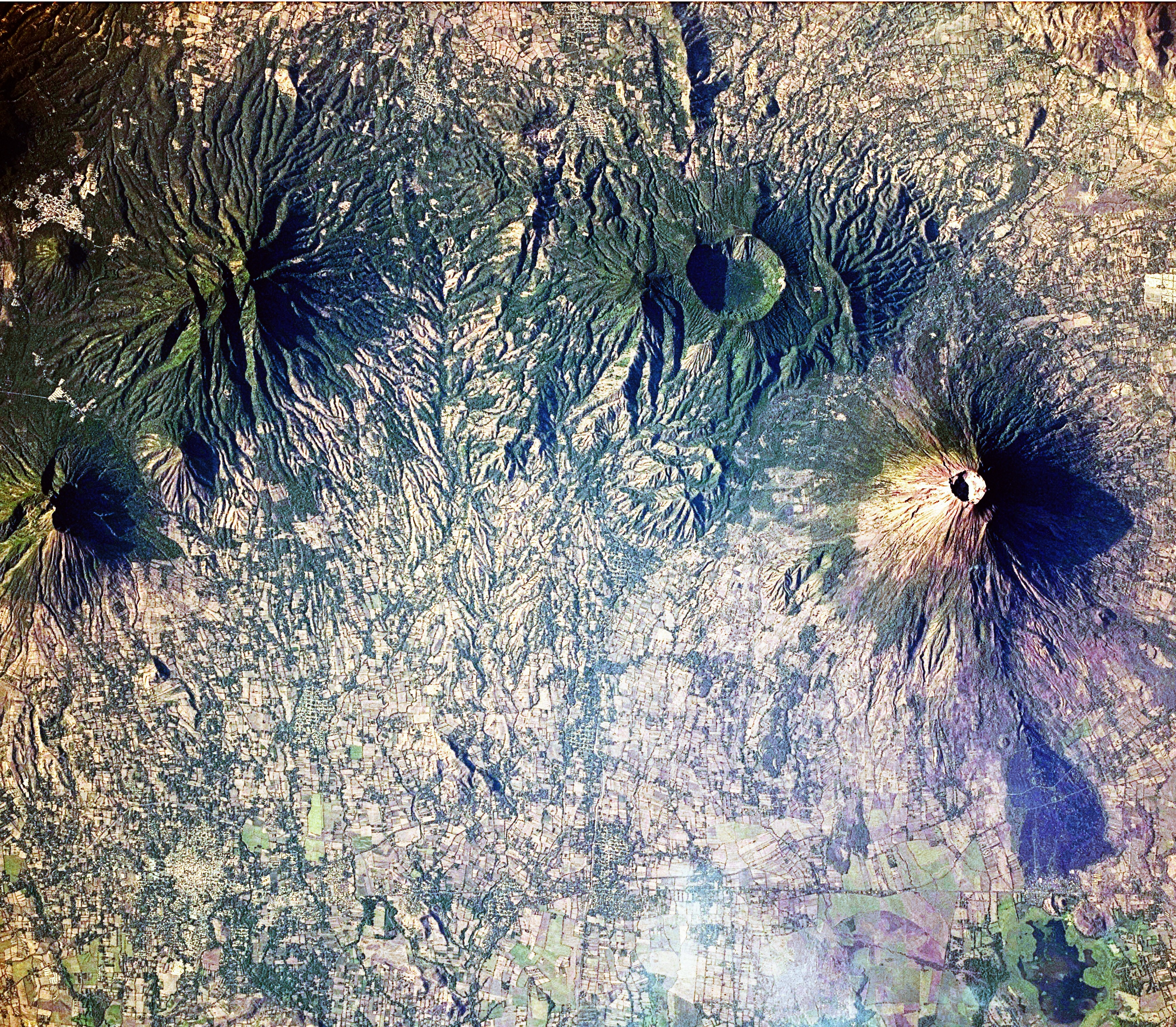
Volcanoes near Usulután.
