= Estadio Jorge "Calero" Suárez =

Coordinates: 14.3321°N 89.4490°W

- El Calero "The Calero"
- Interactive map of Estadio Jorge "Calero" Suárez
- Former names: Los Sauces
- Location: Metapán, El Salvador
- Owner: Alcaldía Municipal de Metapán
- Operator: Alcaldía Municipal de Metapán
- Capacity: 10,000
- Surface: Grass
- Field size: 96 m × 65 m (315 ft × 213 ft)

Construction
- Built: 1940
- Renovated: 1995
- Cost: 1,125 Colones

Tenants
- A.D. Isidro Metapán (2000–present); C.D. Titán (2024–present)

Estadio Jorge "Calero" Suarez is a stadium located in the city of Metapán, El Salvador. It is the largest stadium in Metapán, and is used mostly for football matches. The stadium is the home of Isidro Metapán of the First Division of El Salvador, and has been remodeled several times to be to meet the standards of Concacaf matches.

== Opening ==
The stadium was built at the beginning of the 1940s and was until 1995 the mayor of that time, it was proposed to remodel the stadium and rename it. After its construction in 1996, a tribute to goalkeeper metapaneco with which he was named the stadium and its subsequent opening surrendered.

== History ==
The stadium Metapan "Jorge 'Calero' Suarez Landaverde" Named after the former goalkeeper of the selection of the 70, Jorge 'Calero' Suarez Landaverde. "The Willows" was the first name of the municipal court of the city of Metapan, in honor of the number of trees of the family that had polvozo around the ground. Sixty years ago, back in the early 1940s. Isidro Menendez, then next to Metapan, had its location on this court.

In 1995, an alderman of the municipal government in turn proposed to rename. They said it could take the name of the goalkeeper, leader of the metapaneco football. Thus it was that in 1996, after the completion of the work, which included the bleachers the east side and roof-1 was given a tribute in life he was selected national and member of several national, Guatemalans and even Canadian teams.

To date, the stadium is known and the name of the 'Calero' Suarez. Among the rest of the 1999-2000 and 2000-2001 seasons when Isidro Metapan was in the Liga de Ascenso, it allowed the mayor's proposal, Gumercindo Landaverde, would include the main points engramillado and stadium lighting. Later that year, the engramillado and lighting were engendered by the previous government edilicio Metapan.

The stadium was remodeled in 2015.

== Facilities and Capacity ==
It has a capacity to accommodate about 10,000 people, the second largest stadium in Western El Salvador and one of the four licensed stadiums to host international soccer events.

- The stadium has 4 lighting towers
- Radio booths
- new Dressing
- new bathrooms
- interior and exterior painting
- Perimeter wall
