= Primera División de Fútbol Profesional – Apertura 2009 =

Primera División de Fútbol de El Salvador
- Season: Apertura 2009
- Champions: FAS
- Relegated: None in the Apertura
- 2010–11 CONCACAF Champions League: FAS
- Goals: 232
- Top goalscorer: Williams Reyes; Nicolás Muñoz (11)
- Biggest home win: Balboa 5–0 Nejapa (15 November 2009)
- Biggest away win: Nejapa 0–4 Alianza (15 September 2009)
- Highest scoring: Balboa 3–3 Municipal Limeño (30 August 2009); Vista Hermosa 3–3 Isidro Metapán (11 October 2009); Nejapa 2–4 Municipal Limeño (28 October 2009)

The Apertura 2009 season (officially known as Torneo Apertura 2009) was the twenty-third tournament of the Primera División de Fútbol Profesional since its establishment of an Apertura and Clausura format, and the 41st overall.

FAS won the tournament for the 17th time in history, defeating Águila in the final with a 3–2 victory in extra time.

Isidro Metapán were the defending champions, having won their 3rd title the previous season and being the back to back champions.

== Format ==
A total of 10 teams contested the league, with none getting relegated (relegation only occurs in Clausura tournaments). The season began on August 14, 2009 and concluded on December 20, 2009. The 10 teams of the Primera División played 18 matches, playing each team twice (home and away). The top four teams qualified directly to the semifinals. Since Vista Hermosa and Isidro Metapán finished with the same points at the end of the regular season, a knockout playoff match was played to determine the last team to advance to the playoffs. Vista Hermosa clinched the final spot for the playoffs with a 1–0 victory over Isidro Metapán.

== Promotion and Relegation ==
Promoted from Segunda División de Fútbol Salvadoreño.

- Champions: Atlético Marte
- Municipal Limeño (bought the spot of Chalatenango).

Relegated to Segunda División de Fútbol Salvadoreño.

- Last place: Juventud Independiente
- Chalatenango (sold their spot to Municipal Limeño).

== Team information ==
=== Stadia and locations ===
Location of teams in Apertura 2009

Team	Location	Venue
Águila	Juan Francisco Barraza	10,000
Alianza	Estadio Cuscatlán	45,925
Atlético Balboa	Estadio Marcelino Imbers	4,000
Atlético Marte	Estadio Cuscatlán	45,925
FAS	Estadio Óscar Quiteño	15,000
Isidro Metapán	Estadio Jorge Calero Suárez	8,000
Luís Ángel Firpo	Estadio Sergio Torres	5,000
Municipal Limeño	Estadio Jose Ramon Flores	5,000
Nejapa	Estadio José Gregorio Martínez	15,000
Vista Hermosa	Estadio Correcaminos	12,000

== Team information ==
=== Personnel and sponsoring ===
Team	Chairman	Head coach	Kitmaker	Shirt sponsor
Águila	(El Salvador) TBD	(Brazil) Eraldo Correia	TBD	TBD
Alianza	(El Salvador) TBD	(El Salvador) Nelson Ancheta	TBD	TBD
Atlético Balboa	(El Salvador) TBD	(Brazil) Eduardo Santana	TBD	TBD
Atlético Marte	(El Salvador) TBD	(Argentina) Ramiro Cepeda	TBD	TBD
FAS	(El Salvador) Reynaldo Valle	(Argentina) Roberto Gamarra	TBD	TBD
Firpo	(El Salvador) TBD	(Peru) Agustín Castillo	TBD	TBD
Isidro Metapán	(El Salvador) TBD	(El Salvador) Edwin Portillo	TBD	TBD
C.D. Municipal Limeño	(El Salvador) TBD	(El Salvador) Miguel Soriano	TBD	TBD
Nejapa F.C.	(El Salvador) TBD	(Uruguay) Gustavo de Simone	TBD	TBD
C.D. Vista Hermosa	(El Salvador) TBD	(El Salvador) Armando Palma	TBD	TBD

== League table ==
Pos	Team	Pld	W	D	L	GF	GA	GD	Pts	Qualification
1	FAS	18	12	2	4	31	9	+22	38	Qualified to the Finals
2	Águila	18	9	7	2	22	9	+13	34	Qualified to the Finals
3	Luis Ángel Firpo	18	8	5	5	24	19	+5	29	Qualified to the Finals
4	Vista Hermosa	18	6	8	4	30	21	+9	26	Advanced to the play-off
5	Isidro Metapán	18	7	5	6	21	21	0	26	Advanced to the play-off
6	Atlético Marte	18	5	9	4	21	17	+4	24	
7	Municipal Limeño	18	4	8	6	18	24	−6	20	
8	Alianza	18	3	8	7	18	21	−3	17	
9	Nejapa	18	3	5	10	16	39	−23	14	
10	Atlético Balboa	18	2	5	11	19	40	−21	11	

== Results ==
Home \ Away	AGU	ALI	BAL	ATM	FAS	FIR	MET	MLI	NEJ	VIS
Águila		1–0	3–0	0–0	0–1	1–0	3–1	1–0	1–1	1–1
Alianza	2–2		2–1	1–1	1–2	2–2	0–0	1–2	0–0	2–1
Atlético Balboa	1–2	1–1		0–3	1–3	2–1	0–2	3–3	5–0	0–0
Atlético Marte	0–2	1–1	3–0		0–0	1–2	1–1	2–2	1–0	1–1
FAS	0–1	2–0	4–1	1–2		1–0	3–0	3–0	4–0	2–0
Firpo	1–0	2–0	3–0	1–1	1–0		1–0	1–0	2–3	1–1
Isidro Metapán	0–0	1–0	3–1	1–0	0–3	3–1		1–2	2–1	3–1
Municipal Limeño	0–0	0–0	0–0	2–2	0–1	1–1	1–0		0–2	0–0
Nejapa	0–3	0–4	2–2	1–2	1–0	2–2	0–0	2–4		1–3
Vista Hermosa	1–1	2–1	4–0	1–0	1–1	1–2	3–3	4–1	4–0	

Legend: Blue = home team win; Yellow = draw; Red = away team win.

== Managerial changes ==
=== Before the start of the season ===
Team	Outgoing manager	Manner of departure	Date of vacancy	Replaced by	Date of appointment	Position in table
Atlético Balboa	(El Salvador) Luis Zapata	End of contract	16 June 2009	(Brazil) Eduardo Santana	24 June 2009	9th (Clausura 2009)
Nejapa	(El Salvador) Nelson Ancheta	End of contract	June 2009	(Uruguay) Gustavo de Simone	1 August 2009	4th (Clausura 2009)
Municipal Limeño	(Argentina) Jorge García	End of contract	June 2009	(El Salvador) Miguel Aguilar	June 2009	N/A

=== Regular season ===
Team	Outgoing manager	Manner of departure	Date of vacancy	Replaced by	Date of appointment	Position in table
Municipal Limeño	(El Salvador) Miguel Aguilar	Sacked	31 August 2009	(El Salvador) Víctor Coreas	1 September 2009	N/A
Atlético Balboa	(Brazil) Eduardo Santana	Resigned	1 September 2009	(Argentina) Jorge García	5 September 2009	N/A
Atlético Balboa	(Argentina) Jorge García	Resigned	15 September 2009	(El Salvador) Luis Zapata	24 September 2009	N/A
Vista Hermosa	(El Salvador) Armando Palma	Sacked	October 2009	(El Salvador) Mario Martínez	13 October 2009	N/A
Alianza F.C.	(El Salvador) Nelson Ancheta	Sacked	26 October 2009	(El Salvador) Miguel Soriano	27 October 2009	N/A

== Playoffs ==
Semifinals
1	FAS	2	0	2
4	Vista Hermosa	1	0	1
2	Águila	2	1	3
3	Firpo	0	0	0

Final
1	FAS	3
2	Águila	2

=== Semi-finals ===
==== First leg ====
5 December 2009
15:00 UTC-6

Vista Hermosa	1–2	FAS
Osael Romero 90+1'		Roberto Peña 39'; Williams Reyes 84'

Estadio Correcaminos
San Francisco Gotera, Morazán
Referee: Joel Aguilar

6 December 2009
12:00 UTC-6

Firpo	0–2	Águila
		Darwin Bonilla 6'; Nicholas Addlery 90+1'

Estadio Cuscatlán
San Salvador, San Salvador

==== Second leg ====
12 December 2009
15:15 UTC-6

FAS	0–0	Vista Hermosa

Estadio Óscar Quiteño
Santa Ana, Santa Ana
Referee: Elmer Bonilla

12 December 2009
19:30 UTC-6

Águila	1–0	Firpo
Nicholas Addlery 39'

Estadio Francisco Barraza
San Miguel, San Miguel
Referee: Edenilson V. Santos

=== Final ===
20 December 2009
15:00 UTC-6

FAS	3–2 (a.e.t.)	Águila
Josué Flores 1'; Arturo Albarrán 95' (o.g.); Juan Carlos Moscoso 97'		Nicholas Addlery 64', 100'

Estadio Cuscatlán
San Salvador, San Salvador
Referee: Joel Aguilar

FAS
GK	1	(El Salvador) Dagoberto Portillo
DF	4	(El Salvador) Ramón Flores
DF	3	(El Salvador) Marvin González
DF	6	(El Salvador) José Henríquez
DF	15	(El Salvador) Alfredo Pacheco	(yellow card) 37'
MF	23	(El Salvador) Carlos Aparicio
MF	24	(Colombia) Roberto Peña
MF	8	(El Salvador) Cristian Álvarez
MF	20	(El Salvador) Josué Flores		(substituted off) 89'
FW	9	(Argentina) Alejandro Bentos		(substituted off) 23'
FW	11	(El Salvador) Williams Reyes
Substitutes
FW	16	(Honduras) Franklin Webster		(substituted on) 23' (substituted off) 68'
MF	19	(El Salvador) Gustavo López		(substituted on) 68'
MF	13	(El Salvador) Juan Carlos Moscoso		(substituted on) 89'
Manager
(Argentina) Roberto Gamarra

Águila
GK	1	(El Salvador) Miguel Montes
DF	5	(El Salvador) Luis Hernández
DF	4	(Colombia) Hermes Martínez
DF	17	(El Salvador) Isaac Zelaya	(yellow card) 4'	(substituted off) 46'
DF	13	(El Salvador) Deris Umanzor
MF	16	(Mexico) Arturo Albarrán
MF	6	(El Salvador) Gilberto Murgas	(yellow card) 34'
MF	18	(El Salvador) Juan Lazo		(substituted off) 46'
MF	11	(El Salvador) Francisco Álvarez		(substituted off) 82'
FW	8	(El Salvador) Rudis Corrales
FW	9	(Jamaica) Nicholas Addlery
Substitutes
DF	23	(El Salvador) William Antonio Torres	(red card) 104'	(substituted on) 46'
MF	3	(El Salvador) William Torres Alegría		(substituted on) 46'
FW	7	(El Salvador) Nelson Reyes	(yellow card) 110'	(substituted on) 82'
Manager
(Brazil) Eraldo Correia

Apertura 2009 champions

17th title

== Top-ten goalscorers ==
Rank	Player	Club	Goals
1	(El Salvador) Williams Reyes	FAS	11
1	(Panama) Nicolás Muñoz	Vista Hermosa	11
3	(Brazil) José Oliveira	Municipal Limeño	9
4	(El Salvador) Josué Flores	FAS	7
4	(Panama) Anel Canales	Isidro Metapán	7
4	(Brazil) Leandro Franco	Firpo	7
4	(El Salvador) Carlos Ayala	Alianza	7
8	(El Salvador) Domingo Álvarez	Vista Hermosa	6
8	(El Salvador) Rudis Corrales	Águila	6
8	(El Salvador) Manuel Martinez	Nejapa	6
Source: El Grafico

== List of foreign players in the league ==
This is a list of foreign players in Apertura 2009. The following players:

1. have played at least one apertura game for the respective club.
2. have not been capped for the El Salvador national football team on any level, independently from the birthplace

A new rule was introduced this season that clubs can only have three foreign players per club and can only add a new player if there is an injury or player/s is released.

C.D. Águila

- (Colombia) Hermes Martínez
- (Mexico) Arturo Albarrán
- (Jamaica) Nicholas Addlery

Alianza F.C.

- (Colombia) Elder Figueroa
- (Brazil) Juliano de Andrade
- (Panama) Alberto Zapata
- (Panama) Francisco Portillo

Atlético Marte

- (Mexico) José Luis Osorio
- (Colombia) Wilson Sánchez
- (Peru) Luis Escriba

Atlético Balboa

- (Uruguay) Alcides Bandera
- (Colombia) Luis Asprilla
- (Uruguay) Juan Carlos Reyes

C.D. FAS

- (Colombia) Roberto Peña
- (Argentina) Alejandro Bentos
- (Honduras) Franklin Webster

(player released mid season) Injury replacement player

C.D. Luis Ángel Firpo

- (Colombia) Mario Benítez
- (Argentina) Edgar Leguizamón
- (Brazil) Leandro Franco

A.D. Isidro Metapán

- (Panama) Anel Canales
- (Honduras) Ernesto Aquino
- (Brazil) Gustavo Méndes

Nejapa F.C.

- (Costa Rica) Erick Corrales
- (Uruguay) Luis Espindola
- (Colombia) Andrés Aguirre

Municipal Limeño

- (Brazil) José Oliveira
- (Argentina) Sergio Álvarez
- (Jamaica) Garrick Gordon
- (Paraguay) Gabriel Garcete

Vista Hermosa

- (Panama) Nicolás Muñoz
- (Brazil) Leonardo Da Silva
- (Mexico) Ceveriano Palominos
- (Peru) Jean Franco Carreño
