= Primera División de Fútbol Profesional – Clausura 2010 =

Primera División de Fútbol de El Salvador
- Season: Clausura 2010 -
- Champions: Isidro Metapán
- Relegated: Alacranes Del Norte
- 2010–11 CONCACAF Champions League: Isidro Metapán
- Matches: 96
- Goals: 226 (2.35 per match)
- Top goalscorer: (Brazil) José Oliveira de Souza (11)
- Biggest home win: Atlético Marte 6–0 Atlético Balboa (17 January 2010); Alianza 7–1; Isidro Metapán (21 March 2010)
- Biggest away win: Alacranes Del Norte 0–5 Vista Hermosa (7 April 2010)
- Highest scoring: Alianza 7–1; Isidro Metapán (21 March 2010)

The Clausura 2010 season (officially known as Torneo Clausura 2010) was the 24th edition of the Primera División de Fútbol Profesional since its establishment of an Apertura and Clausura format. Isidro Metapán won the tournament, claiming their fourth title in history. The season began on January 9, 2010 and concluded on May 23, 2010. FAS were the defending champions, having won the Apertura 2009 and clinching the first of two salvadoran spots for the 2010–11 CONCACAF Champions League. Isidro Metapán clinched the other spot. Like previous years, the league consisted of 10 teams, each playing a home and away game against the other clubs for a total of 18 games, respectively. The top four teams by the end of the regular season took part of the playoffs.

Municipal Limeño was tied for penultimate club for the 2009–2010 season. They had a 1-game playoff to determine who the penultimate club would be. Limeño lost that match, designating it as the penultimate club of the 2009–2010 season, and thus, having to partake in a relegation playoff against the 2nd division runner-up. Limeño would lose this playoff and thus get relegated to the 2nd division for the 2010–2011 season.

== Team information ==
=== Stadia and locations ===
Location of teams in Clausura 2010

Team	Location	Venue
Águila	Juan Francisco Barraza	10,000
Alacranes Del Norte	Estadio José Gregorio Martínez (Note: Alacranes Del Norte officially made the Estadio José Gregorio Martínez as their new home stadium after moving to the city of Chalatenango from Nejapa. Polideportivo Victoria Gasteiz served as their home stadium in previous seasons, however due to a stadium loan dispute with local officials, they decided to move the club to the city of Chalatenago and renamed the club to Alacranes del Norte (scorpions of the north) or also (northern scorpions) due to their new city's geographical location.)	15,000
Alianza	Estadio Cuscatlán	45,925
Atlético Balboa	Estadio Marcelino Imbers	4,000
Atlético Marte	Estadio Cuscatlán	45,925
FAS	Estadio Óscar Quiteño	15,000
Isidro Metapán	Estadio Jorge Calero Suárez	8,000
Luís Ángel Firpo	Estadio Sergio Torres	5,000
Municipal Limeño	Estadio Jose Ramon Flores	5,000
Vista Hermosa	Estadio Correcaminos	12,000

== Team information ==
=== Personnel and sponsoring ===
Team	Chairman	Head coach	Kitmaker	Shirt sponsor
Águila		(El Salvador) Nelson Ancheta		
Alianza		(Serbia) Miloš Miljanić		
Atlético Balboa		(Guatemala) Carlos Mijangos		
Atlético Marte		(Argentina) Ramiro Cepeda		
FAS		(Argentina) Roberto Gamarra		
Firpo		(Argentina) Hugo Coria		
Isidro Metapán		(El Salvador) Edwin Portillo		
Municipal Limeño		(El Salvador) Víctor Coreas		
Nejapa F.C.		(Uruguay) Gustavo de Simone		
Vista Hermosa		(Argentina) Jorge García		

== Managerial changes ==
=== Before the start of the season ===
Team	Outgoing manager	Manner of departure	Date of vacancy	Replaced by	Date of appointment	Position in table
Alianza	(El Salvador) Miguel Soriano		November 2009	(Serbia) Miloš Miljanić	14 November 2009	8th (Apertura 2009)
Luis Ángel Firpo	(Peru) Agustín Castillo	End of contract	December 2009	(Argentina) Hugo Coria	21 December 2009	3rd (Apertura 2009)
Atlético Balboa	(El Salvador) Luis Ramírez Zapata	Contract ended after pay dispute	December 2009	(Guatemala) Carlos Mijangos	22 December 2009	10th (Apertura 2009)
Águila	(Brazil) Eraldo Correia	Sacked	22 December 2009	(El Salvador) Nelson Ancheta	28 December 2009	2nd (Apertura 2009)

=== Regular season ===
Team	Outgoing manager	Manner of departure	Date of vacancy	Replaced by	Date of appointment	Position in table
Municipal Limeño	(El Salvador) Víctor Coreas	Sacked	24 January 2010	(Brazil) Eraldo Correia	25 January 2010	9th (Clausura 2010)
Alacranes Del Norte	(Uruguay) Gustavo de Simone	Sacked	25 January 2010	(El Salvador) Carlos Meléndez	26 January 2010	10th (Clausura 2010)
Águila	(El Salvador) Nelson Ancheta	Sacked	23 March 2010	(Uruguay) Rubén Alonso	24 March 2010	2nd (Clausura 2010)
FAS	(Argentina) Roberto Gamarra	Resigned	7 April 2010	(El Salvador) Adolfo Menéndez	8 April 2010	5th (Clausura 2010)

== League table ==
Pos	Team	Pld	W	D	L	GF	GA	GD	Pts	Qualification or relegation
1	Luis Ángel Firpo	18	10	5	3	28	17	+11	35	Qualification for playoffs
2	Águila	18	7	10	1	24	9	+15	31	Qualification for playoffs
3	Vista Hermosa	18	7	8	3	25	17	+8	29	Qualification for playoffs
4	Isidro Metapán (C)	18	6	10	2	24	20	+4	28	Qualification for playoffs
5	Atlético Balboa	18	6	9	3	18	17	+1	27	
6	Alianza	18	6	6	6	22	18	+4	24	
7	FAS	18	5	5	8	19	25	−6	20	
8	Municipal Limeño	18	3	9	6	20	27	−7	18	
9	Atlético Marte	18	3	7	8	22	27	−5	16	
10	Alacranes Del Norte (R)	18	0	5	13	12	37	−25	5	Relegation to Segunda Division

Updated to match(es) played on May 23, 2010. Source: El Gráfico
Rules for classification: 1st points; 2nd goal difference; 3rd goals scored
(C) Champions; (R) Relegated

== Results ==
Home \ Away	ÁGU	ALA	ALI	BAL	ATM	FAS	FIR	MET	MLI	VIS
Águila		3–0	2–0	0–0	1–1	2–2	2–2	0–0	0–0	3–0
Alacranes Del Norte	0–4		0–0	0–0	1–1	0–0	2–3	1–2	1–1	0–5
Alianza	0–2	1–0		0–0	2–0	3–0	2–1	7–1	3–1	1–1
Atlético Balboa	0–1	2–1	3–1		2–1	3–0	0–1	0–0	3–3	1–0
Atlético Marte	0–0	2–1	1–0	6–0		2–2	0–2	1–1	0–1	2–2
C.D. FAS	1–0	4–1	0–0	0–0	3–1		1–2	0–1	2–0	2–0
Luis Ángel Firpo	1–1	1–0	2–0	1–2	4–1	2–1		2–2	1–0	0–0
Isidro Metapán	1–1	3–1	3–1	1–1	3–2	4–0	1–1		0–0	0–0
Municipal Limeño	1–2	3–2	0–0	1–1	1–1	1–0	1–2	1–1		3–3
Vista Hermosa	0–0	2–1	1–1	0–0	1–0	3–1	1–0	1–0	5–2	

Updated to match(es) played on April 25, 2010. Source: El Gráfico (in Spanish)
Legend: Blue = home team win; Yellow = draw; Red = away team win.

== Playoffs ==
Semifinals
1	Luis Ángel Firpo	2	1	3
4	Isidro Metapán	2	2	4
2	Águila	1	0	1
3	Vista Hermosa	0	0	0

Finals
1	Isidro Metapán	3
2	Águila	1

=== Semi-finals ===
==== First leg ====
May 1, 2010
15:00 UTC-6

Vista Hermosa	0–1	Águila
		Shawn Martin 53'

Estadio Correcaminos
San Francisco Gotera, Morazán
Attendance: 3,202
Referee: Jaime Carpio

May 1, 2010
19:00 UTC-6

Isidro Metapán	2–2	Luis Ángel Firpo
Josué Flores 24'; Emerson Umaña 43'		Fernando Leguizamón 17'; Dennis Alas 51'

Estadio Jorge Calero Suárez
Metapán, San Salvador
Attendance: 2,300
Referee: Rubén Medrano

==== Second leg ====
May 8, 2010
19:00 UTC-6

Águila	0–0	Vista Hermosa

Estadio Francisco Barraza
San Miguel, San Miguel
Referee: Edenilson Ventura

May 9, 2010
15:00 UTC-6

Luis Ángel Firpo	1–2	Isidro Metapán
Jorge Sánchez 70'		Andrés Flores 4'; Elías Montes 82'

Estadio Cuscatlán
San Salvador, San Salvador

=== Final ===
May 23, 2010
15:00 UTC-6

Isidro Metapán	3–1	Águila
Léster Blanco 22', 45+2'; Paolo Suárez 90+6'		Rudis Corrales 63'

Estadio Cuscatlán
San Salvador, San Salvador
Referee: Joel Aguilar

Isidro Metapán:
GK	15	(El Salvador) Misael Alfaro	(yellow card) 86'
DF	5	(Honduras) Ernesto Aquino
DF	19	(El Salvador) Alexander Escobar	(yellow card) 79'	(substituted off) 90+4'
DF	23	(El Salvador) Ricardo Alvarado
DF	20	(El Salvador) Héctor Mejía
MF	16	(El Salvador) Óscar Jiménez
MF	14	(El Salvador) Andrés Flores
MF	21	(El Salvador) Josué Flores	(yellow card) 62'	(substituted off) 90+1'
MF	22	(El Salvador) Emerson Umaña
FW	24	(El Salvador) Léster Blanco		(substituted off) 76'
FW	10	(Uruguay) Paolo Suárez	(yellow card) 25'
Substitutes:
DF	2	(El Salvador) Milton Molina		(substituted on) 76'
FW	12	(Paraguay) Gabriel Garcete		(substituted on) 90+1'
DF	8	(El Salvador) Mario Aguilar		(substituted on) 90+4'
Manager:
(El Salvador) Edwin Portillo

Águila:
GK	1	(El Salvador) Miguel Montes
DF	4	(Colombia) Hermes Martínez
DF	17	(El Salvador) Isaac Zelaya	(yellow card) 47'
DF	5	(El Salvador) Luis Hernández		(substituted off) 52'
DF	23	(El Salvador) William Antonio Torres
MF	6	(El Salvador) Gilberto Murgas
MF	20	(El Salvador) Eliseo Salamanca
MF	42	(El Salvador) Darwin Bonilla		(substituted off) 32'
MF	3	(El Salvador) William Torres Alegría
FW	8	(El Salvador) Rudis Corrales
FW	7	(El Salvador) Nelson Reyes		(substituted off) 81'
Substitutes:
DF	11	(El Salvador) Francisco Álvarez		(substituted on) 32'
MF	12	(El Salvador) Shawn Martin		(substituted on) 52'
MF	16	(Mexico) Arturo Albarrán		(substituted on) 81'
Manager:
(Uruguay) Rubén Alonso

Clausura 2010 champions

4th title

== Top scorers ==
Rank	Scorer	Club	Goals
1	(Brazil) José Oliveira de Souza	Alianza	11
2	(Brazil) Leonardo Da Silva	Vista Hermosa	10
3	(Uruguay) Alcides Bandera	Atlético Balboa	6
3	(Colombia) John Castillo	Vista Hermosa	6
3	(Mexico) José Luis Osorio	Atlético Marte	6
6	(El Salvador) Dennis Alas	Luis Ángel Firpo	5
6	(Colombia) Mario Benítez	Luis Ángel Firpo	5
6	(El Salvador) Rudis Corrales	Águila	5
6	(El Salvador) Roberto Maradiaga	Atlético Marte	5
6	(El Salvador) Emerson Umaña	Isidro Metapán	5
6	(El Salvador) Rodolfo Zelaya	Alianza	5

Updated to games played on April 25, 2010.
Post-season goals are not included, only regular season goals.

== Aggregate table ==
Pos	Team	Pld	W	D	L	GF	GA	GD	Pts	Qualification or relegation
1	Águila	36	16	17	3	46	18	+28	65	
2	Luis Ángel Firpo	36	18	10	8	48	36	+12	64	
3	FAS	36	17	7	12	50	34	+16	58	Qualification for 2010–11 CONCACAF Champions League Preliminary Round
4	Isidro Metapán	36	14	14	8	45	41	+4	56	Qualification for 2010–11 CONCACAF Champions League Preliminary Round
5	Vista Hermosa	36	13	16	7	55	38	+17	55	
6	Alianza	36	9	14	13	40	39	+1	41	
7	Atlético Marte	36	8	16	12	43	44	−1	40	
8	Municipal Limeño	36	7	17	12	38	50	−12	38 (Note: Since Municipal Limeño and Atlético Balboa finished the same on aggregate points, both took part of a one leg playoff game to determine the 9th overall and see who would play in the relegation playoffs series. Atlético Balboa won the game 1–0, meaning they have secured a spot for next season in the first division. Meanwhile, Municipal Limeño will play the relegation playoff series against a second division team to determine who will play in the top division next season.)	Relegation playoffs
9	Atlético Balboa	36	8	14	14	37	57	−20	38	
10	Alacranes Del Norte (R)	36	3	10	23	27	76	−49	19	Relegation to Segunda Division

Updated to match(es) played on April 25, 2010. Source: El Gráfico
Rules for classification: 1st points; 2nd goal difference; 3rd goals scored
(R) Relegated

== List of foreign players in the league ==
This is a list of foreign players in Clausura 2010. The following players:

1. have played at least one apertura game for the respective club.
2. have not been capped for the El Salvador national football team on any level, independently from the birthplace

A new rule was introduced this season that clubs can only have three foreign players per club and can only add a new player if there is an injury or player/s is released.

C.D. Águila

- (Colombia) Hermes Martínez
- (Mexico) Arturo Albarrán
- (Panama) Nicolás Muñoz
- (Paraguay) Edgar Añazco
- (Brazil) Maxwell Ferreira

Alianza F.C.

- (Brazil) José Oliveira de Souza
- (Colombia) Mario Muñoz
- (Colombia) Edgar Ramos

Atlético Marte

- (Mexico) José Luis Osorio
- (Colombia) Wilson Sánchez
- (Brazil) Juliano De Carvalho

Atlético Balboa

- (Uruguay) Alcides Bandera
- (Argentina) Javier Rabbia
- (Colombia) Luis Torres

C.D. FAS

- (Colombia) Roberto Peña
- (Argentina) Alejandro Bentos
- (Paraguay) Jeyson Vega

(player released mid season)

C.D. Luis Ángel Firpo

- (Colombia) Mario Benítez
- (Argentina) Fernando Leguizamón
- (Brazil) Juliano de Andrade

A.D. Isidro Metapán

- (Paraguay) Gabriel Garcete
- (Honduras) Ernesto Aquino
- (Uruguay) Paolo Suárez

Alacranes Del Norte

- (Uruguay) Luis Espindola
- (Costa Rica) Enar Bolaños
- (Honduras) Franklin Webster

Municipal Limeño

- (Colombia) Cristian Mosquera
- (Jamaica) Garrick Gordon
- (Honduras) Marvin Sánchez
- (Honduras) Wilmer Ramos
- (Peru) Richard Camaña

Vista Hermosa

- (Colombia) John Castillo
- (Brazil) Leonardo Da Silva
- (Panama) Rolando Rojas
- (Peru) Israel Garcia

== See also ==
- List of football clubs in El Salvador
- List of Salvadoran football champions
