= Primera División de Fútbol Profesional Apertura 2008 =

Primera División de Fútbol Profesional de El Salvador
- Season: Apertura 2008
- Champions: A.D. Isidro Metapán (2nd title)
- CONCACAF Champions League 2009–10: A.D. Isidro Metapán
- Top goalscorer: (El Salvador) Carlos Ayala (11)

The Primera División de Fútbol Profesional Apertura 2008 season (officially known as "Torneo Apertura 2008"), started on August 2, 2008, and finished on December 21, 2008.

C.D. Luis Ángel Firpo came into the tournament as defending champions, having won their eighth league title in the previous season. A total of 10 teams contested the league, 8 of which had already participated in the Clausura 2008 season, and two of which had been promoted from the Segunda División de Fútbol Salvadoreño.

The 10 teams of the Primera División each played 18 matches, playing each team twice (home and away). The top four teams qualified directly to the semifinals.

The winner of the final series gained entry into the 2009–10 CONCACAF Champions League.

== Promotion and relegation ==
Promoted from Segunda División de Fútbol Salvadoreño as of June 27, 2008.

- Champions: C.D. Atlético Balboa
- Runner-up (won through playoff): Juventud Independiente

Relegated to Segunda División de Fútbol Salvadoreño as of June 27, 2008.

- Last place: Once Municipal
- Second last (lost through playoff): San Salvador F.C.

== Team information ==
=== Personnel and sponsoring ===
Team	Chairman	Head coach	Kitmaker	Shirt sponsor
Águila	(El Salvador)	(Peru) Agustín Castillo	TBD	TBD
Alianza	(El Salvador)	(Argentina) Pablo Centrone	TBD	TBD
C.D. Atlético Balboa	(El Salvador) TBD	(Uruguay) Gustavo de Simone	TBD	TBD
C.D. Chalatenango	(El Salvador)	(El Salvador) Carlos Meléndez		
FAS	(El Salvador) Reynaldo Valle	(El Salvador) Nelson Ancheta	TBD	TBD
Firpo	(El Salvador) TBD	(El Salvador) Miguel Obando	TBD	TBD
Juventud Independiente	(El Salvador)	(El Salvador) Jorge Abrego	TBD	TBD
Isidro Metapán	(El Salvador)	(El Salvador) Edwin Portillo	TBD	TBD
Nejapa F.C.	(El Salvador)	(El Salvador) Mauricio Cienfuegos	TBD	TBD
C.D. Vista Hermosa	(El Salvador) TBD	(El Salvador) Víctor Coreas	TBD	TBD

== League standings ==
Pos	Team	Pld	W	D	L	GF	GA	GD	Pts	Qualification
1	C.D. Águila	18	10	4	4	39	19	+20	34	Qualified to semifinals
2	A.D. Isidro Metapán	18	8	7	3	32	21	+11	31	Qualified to semifinals
3	C.D. FAS	18	8	6	4	27	22	+5	30	Qualified to semifinals
4	C.D. Chalatenango	18	7	7	4	25	24	+1	28	Qualified to semifinals
5	C.D. Vista Hermosa	18	7	6	5	20	16	+4	27	
6	C.D. Luis Ángel Firpo	18	5	7	6	20	18	+2	22	
7	C.D. Atlético Balboa	18	4	8	6	23	29	−6	20	
8	Juventud Independiente	18	4	7	7	21	35	−14	19	
9	Alianza F.C.	18	4	5	9	19	25	−6	17	
10	Nejapa F.C.	18	2	5	11	16	34	−18	11	

== Semifinals 1st leg ==
2008-12-06

Metapán	1–3	FAS
Héctor Mejía 86'	Report	Osvaldo Mendoza 55', 75'; Alejandro Bentos 77'

Estadio Jorge Calero Suárez
Attendance: 2,549

2008-12-07

Chalatenango	3–0	Águila
José Luis Osorio 50' (pen.), 78'; Fredy Vichéz 92'	Report

Estadio José Gregorio Martínez
Attendance: 4,800

== Semifinals 2nd leg ==
2008-12-13

Águila	1–0	Chalatenango
José de Souza 79'	Report

Estadio Juan Francisco Barraza
Attendance: 5,122

2008-12-13

FAS	1–3	Metapán
Alfredo Pacheco 65'	Report	Williams Reyes 16'; José Amaya 35'; Dagoberto Portillo 45' (pen.)

Estadio Oscar Quiteño
Attendance: 11,463

== Final ==
2008-12-21

Chalatenango	3–3 (a.e.t.)	Metapán
Carlos Ayala 48'; Léster Blanco 62'; Amílcar Ramírez 100'		Dagoberto Portillo 47' (pen.); José Manuel Martínez 65'; Dagoberto Portillo 113' (pen.)
Penalties
Hermes Martínez (penalty missed); Amílcar Ramírez (penalty scored); Carlos Ayala (penalty scored); Fredy Vichéz (penalty missed); José Luis Osorio (penalty scored)	3–4	(penalty scored) Dagoberto Portillo; (penalty scored) Williams Reyes; (penalty missed) Paolo Suárez; (penalty scored) Alexander Escobar; (penalty scored) Erick Prado

Estadio Cuscatlán
Attendance: 14,403

Chalatenango
GK	(El Salvador) Jassir Deras
DF	(El Salvador) Cristian López
DF	(El Salvador) Ramón Martínez
DF	(Colombia) Hermes Martínez
DF	(El Salvador) Roberto García
MF	(El Salvador) Juan Carlos Serrano	Substituted off
MF	(El Salvador) Óscar Navarro
MF	(El Salvador) Léster Blanco (substituted off)
MF	(Mexico) Manuel Luna	Substituted off
FW	(Mexico) José Luis Osorio
FW	(El Salvador) Carlos Ayala
Substitutes:
FW	(El Salvador) Fredy Vichéz	Substituted on
MF	(El Salvador) Mario Deras	Substituted on
MF	(El Salvador) Amílcar Ramírez	Substituted on
Manager:
(El Salvador) Carlos Antonio Meléndez

Isidro Metapán:
GK	(El Salvador) Dagoberto Portillo
DF	(El Salvador) Ricardo Alvarado
DF	(El Salvador) Alexander Escobar
DF	(Honduras) Ernesto Aquino
DF	(El Salvador) Ernesto Iraheta	Substituted off
MF	(El Salvador) Mario Aguilar
MF	(El Salvador) Héctor Mejía (red card) 70'
MF	(El Salvador) José Amaya	Substituted off
MF	(Uruguay) Paolo Suárez
FW	(Honduras) Williams Reyes
FW	(El Salvador) Julio Martínez	Substituted off
Substitutes:
FW	(El Salvador) José Manuel Martínez	(substituted on) (red card) 71'
MF	(El Salvador) Erick Dowson Prado	Substituted on
DF	(El Salvador) Jorge Morán	Substituted on
Manager:
(El Salvador) Edwin Portillo

=== Champion ===
Apertura 2008 Champion

2nd title

A.D. Isidro Metapán qualified for 2009–10 CONCACAF Champions League.

== Season statistics ==
=== Scoring ===
- First goal of the season: Nicolás Muñoz for Alianza against Balboa (2 August 2008)
- Fastest goal in a match: 25 seconds – Alejandro de la Cruz Bentos for FAS against Nejapa (26 October 2008)
- Goal scored at the latest point in a match: 90+9 minutes
  - José Oliveira de Souza for Águila against Independiente (23 August 2008)
- Widest winning margin: 10 – Águila 10–0 Independiente (23 August 2008)
- Most goals in a match: 10
  - Águila 10–0 Independiente (23 August 2008)
  - Balboa 3-7 Independiente (30 August 2008)
- First hat-trick of the season: José Oliveira de Souza for Águila against Independiente (30 August 2008)
- First own goal of the season: Luis Espíndola for Nejapa against Balboa (29 October 2008)
- Most goals by one player in a single match: 3
  - José Oliveira de Souza for Águila against Independiente (30 August 2008)
- Most goals by one team in a match: 10
  - Águila 10–0 Independiente (23 August 2008)
- Most goals in one half by one team: 6
  - Águila 10–0 Independiente (23 August 2008)
- Most goals scored by losing team: 3
  - Balboa 3-7 Independiente (30 August 2008)

=== Average home attendance ===
- Highest average home attendance: 3,712 (Águila)
- Lowest average home attendance: 667 (Nejapa)

=== Clean sheets ===
- Most clean sheets - Firpo (9)
- Fewest clean sheets - Nejapa, Alianza and Independiente (7)

=== Overall ===
- Most wins - Águila (10)
- Fewest wins - Nejapa (2)
- Most draws - Balboa (8)
- Fewest draws - Águila (4)
- Most losses - Nejapa (11)
- Fewest losses - Metapán (3)
- Most goals scored - Águila (39)
- Fewest goals scored - Nejapa (16)
- Most goals conceded - Independiente (35)
- Fewest goals conceded - Vista Hermosa (16)

=== Home ===
- Most wins - Águila and Metapán (6)
- Fewest wins - Independiente and Alianza (1)
- Most draws - Independiente (5)
- Fewest draws - Nejapa and Metapán (1)
- Most losses - Alianza (4)
- Fewest losses - Águila, Metapán, FAS, Chalatenango and Vista Hermosa (1)
- Most goals scored - Metapán (24)
- Fewest goals scored - Independiente (5)
- Most goals conceded - Nejapa (20)
- Fewest goals conceded - Águila (6)

=== Away ===
- Most wins - Águila and FAS (4)
- Fewest wins - Nejapa (0)
- Most draws - Metapán and Balboa (5)
- Fewest draws - Alianza (1)
- Most losses - Alianza and Nejapa (5)
- Fewest losses - Metapán (2)
- Most goals scored - Águila (17)
- Fewest goals scored - Nejapa (6)
- Most goals conceded - Independiente (25)
- Fewest goals conceded - Metapán and Vista Hermosa (9)

== Top scorers ==
Total	Player		Team	Goals per Round																	
Total	Player		Team	1	2	3	4	5	6	7	8	9	10	11	12	13	14	15	16	17	18
11	(El Salvador)	Carlos Ayala	Chalatenango	1			1		1			1	2	1		1			1	2	
9	(Brazil)	José Oliveira de Souza	Águila			2	3	1		1	1		1								
8	(El Salvador)	César Larios	FAS	1		1	1				1	1	1		1			1			
8	(Honduras) (El Salvador)	Williams Reyes	Metapán	1	1		1				1					2				2	
8	(Honduras)	Franklin Webster	Balboa		1	1	1	2				1		1				1			
7	(Argentina)	Edgar Leguizamón	Firpo				1	1				1	1	1			1		1		
7	(Honduras)	Pompilio Cacho	Vista Hermosa	1			1	1	1		1			1		1					
5	(El Salvador)	Rudis Corrales	Águila	2	1										1			1			
5	(Paraguay)	Gabriel Garcete	Metapán		1	1				1		1			1	1					
5	(Uruguay)	Alcides Bandera	Balboa	1					1			1				1				1	
5	(Argentina) (El Salvador)	Emiliano Pedrozo	Nejapa											1		1	1	1	1		
5	(Panama)	Nicolás Muñoz	Alianza	1			1	1					1				1				
5	(El Salvador)	Alfredo Pacheco	FAS		1				2				1			1					
As of the end of the regular season

=== Fastest scorers ===
Scorer	Time (seconds)	Team	Opponent
(Argentina) Alejandro de la Cruz Bentos	25	FAS	Nejapa
(El Salvador) Mario Aguilar Posada	40	Metapán	Firpo
(El Salvador) Christian Castillo	42	Alianza	Águila

== Attendance ==
Attendance	Round	Date	Home	Score	Away	Venue	Weekday	Time of Day
14,403	Final	21 December 2008	Chalatenango	3 – 3	Metapán	Estadio Cuscatlán	Sunday	Afternoon
11,463	Semifinal - 2nd leg	13 December 2008	FAS	1 – 3	Metapán	Estadio Oscar Quiteño	Saturday	Night
7,690	Round 2	6 August 2008	Águila	3 – 1	FAS	Estadio Juan Francisco Barraza	Wednesday	Night
6,997	Round 16	12 November 2008	FAS	1 – 0	Águila	Estadio Oscar Quiteño	Wednesday	Night
6,156	Round 8	20 September 2008	Águila	1 – 0	Alianza	Estadio Juan Francisco Barraza	Saturday	Twilight
5,815	Round 15	15 November 2008	FAS	1 – 1	Metapán	Estadio Oscar Quiteño	Saturday	Night
5,307	Round 2	6 August 2008	Alianza	3 – 1	Independiente	Estadio Cuscatlán	Wednesday	Afternoon
5,122	Semifinal - 2nd leg	13 December 2008	Águila	1 – 0	Chalatenango	Estadio Juan Francisco Barraza	Saturday	Night
4,800	Semifinal - 1st leg	7 December 2008	Chalatenango	3 – 0	Águila	Estadio José Gregorio Martínez	Sunday	Afternoon
4,722	Round 13	5 November 2008	Águila	3 – 2	Firpo	Estadio Juan Francisco Barraza	Wednesday	Night
4,510	Round 3	9 August 2008	Firpo	1 – 2	Alianza	Estadio Sergio Torres	Saturday	Night

== Managerial changes ==
Team	Outgoing manager	Manner of departure	Date of vacancy	Replaced by	Date of appointment	Position in table
C.D. Chalatenango	(El Salvador) Juan Ramón Sánchez	TBD	June 2008	(El Salvador) Carlos Antonio Meléndez	June 2008	Pre-season
Nejapa	(El Salvador) Mauricio Cienfuegos	Mutual consent	14 August 2008	(El Salvador) Emiliano Pedrozo	August 2008	10th
Nejapa	(El Salvador) Emiliano Pedrozo	went back to being a player	September 2008	(Uruguay) Daniel Uberti	5 September 2008	10th
Firpo	(Argentina) Gerardo Reinoso	Sacked	25 August 2008	(El Salvador) Óscar Benítez	2 September 2008	7th
Balboa	(Uruguay) Gustavo de Simone	Sacked	30 August 2008	(Paraguay) Roberto Gamarra	5 September 2008	10th
Alianza	(Argentina) Pablo Centrone	Sacked	14 September 2008	(Uruguay) Carlos Jurado	16 September 2008	5th
Firpo	(El Salvador) Oscar Benítez	Sacked	9 December 2008	(Peru) Agustín Castillo	23 December 2008	Postseason (6th)
Águila	(Peru) Agustín Castillo	Sacked	15 December 2008	(Argentina) Pablo Centrone	24 December 2008	Postseason (Semifinals)
FAS	(El Salvador) Nelson Ancheta	Sacked	27 December 2008	(Paraguay) Roberto Gamarra	1 January 2009	Postseason (Semifinals)
Nejapa	(Uruguay) Daniel Uberti	Sacked	29 December 2008	(El Salvador) Nelson Ancheta	29 December 2008	Postseason (10th)
Balboa	(Paraguay) Roberto Gamarra	Mutual consent	1 January 2009	(Argentina) Carlos de Toro	16 January 2009	Postseason (7th)
Juventud	(El Salvador) Jorge Abrego	Sacked	December 2008	(El Salvador) Juan Ramón Sánchez	December 2009	Postseason (8th)

== List of foreign players in the league ==
This is a list of foreign players in Apertura 2008. The following players:

1. have played at least one apertura game for the respective club.
2. have not been capped for the El Salvador national football team on any level, independently from the birthplace

A new rule was introduced this season that clubs can only have three foreign players per club and can only add a new player if there is an injury or player/s is released.

C.D. Águila

- (Brazil) José Oliveira
- (Brazil) Marcelo Messias
- (Mexico) Arturo Albarrán
- (Brazil) Leandro Franco

Alianza F.C.

- (Brazil) Gustavo Méndes
- (Panama) Francisco Portillo
- (Colombia) Juan Carlos Mosquera
- (Panama) Nicolás Muñoz

Atlético Balboa

- (Uruguay) Alcides Bandera
- (Honduras) Franklin Webster
- (Colombia) Cristian Mosquera
- (Peru) Santos Nuñez

Chalatenango

- (Mexico) Jose Luis Osorio
- (Mexico) Manuel Luna
- (Colombia) Hermes Martínez
- (Argentina) Roberto Chanampe
- (Peru) Julio Manrique
- (Peru) Ernesto Pezo

C.D. FAS

- (Argentina) Alejandro Bentos
- (Paraguay) Osvaldo Mendoza
- (Sierra Leone) Yusuf Sindeh
- (Brazil) Paulo César Rodrigues

(player released mid season) Injury replacement player

Juventud Independiente

- (Argentina) Carlos Escalante
- (Argentina) Lucas Abraham
- (Brazil) Fabricio Da Silva
- (Peru) Nick ´Pimentel

C.D. Luis Ángel Firpo

- (Argentina) Patricio Barroche
- (Argentina) Edgar Leguizamón
- (Argentina) Leonardo Pekarnik
- (Chile) Ramón Ávila

Nejapa FC

- (Uruguay) Juan Carlos Reyes
- (Uruguay) Luis Espíndola
- (Honduras) Henry Josué Martínez

A.D. Isidro Metapán

- (Paraguay) Gabriel Garcete
- (Honduras) Ernesto Noel Aquino
- (Uruguay) Paolo Suarez
- (Honduras) Williams Reyes

Vista Hermosa

- (Honduras) Pompilio Cacho Valerio
- (Colombia) Luis Torres Rodríguez
- (Colombia) Elder José Figueroa
- (Honduras) José Francisco Ramírez
