= Primera División de Fútbol Profesional Clausura 2009 =

Primera División de Fútbol de El Salvador
- Season: Clausura 2009
- Champions: Isidro Metapán (3rd title)
- Relegated: Juventud Independiente
- CONCACAF Champions League 2009–10: Isidro Metapán Firpo
- Top goalscorer: (Panama) Nicolás Muñoz (10)

The Primera División de Fútbol Profesional Clausura 2009 season (officially known as "Torneo Clausura 2009"), started on January 31, 2009, and concluded on May 24, 2009.

A.D. Isidro Metapán the defending champions, won their third league title winning the previous season as well. A total of 10 teams contested the league.

The 10 teams of the Primera División each played 18 matches, playing each team twice (home and away). The top four teams qualified directly to the semifinals.

A.D. Isidro Metapán gained entry into the 2009–10 CONCACAF Champions League winning the season as well as the previous one .

== Team information ==
=== Personnel and sponsoring ===
Team	Chairman	Head coach	Kitmaker	Shirt sponsor
Águila	(El Salvador) TBD	(Argentina) Pablo Centrone	TBD	TBD
Alianza	(El Salvador) TBD	(Uruguay) Carlos Jurado	TBD	TBD
Atlético Balboa	(El Salvador) TBD	(Argentina) Carlos de Toro	TBD	TBD
Chalatenango	(El Salvador) TBD	(El Salvador) Carlos Meléndez	TBD	TBD
FAS	(El Salvador) Reynaldo Valle	(Argentina) Roberto Gamarra	TBD	TBD
Firpo	(El Salvador) TBD	(Peru) Agustín Castillo	TBD	TBD
Juventud Independiente	(El Salvador) TBD	(El Salvador) Juan Ramón Sánchez	TBD	TBD
Isidro Metapán	(El Salvador) TBD	(El Salvador) Edwin Portillo	TBD	TBD
Nejapa F.C.	(El Salvador) TBD	(El Salvador) Nelson Ancheta	TBD	TBD
C.D. Vista Hermosa	(El Salvador) TBD	(El Salvador) Víctor Coreas	TBD	TBD

== League standings ==
Pos	Team	Pld	W	D	L	GF	GA	GD	Pts	Qualification
1	A.D. Isidro Metapán	18	10	5	3	27	14	+13	35	Qualify to semifinals
2	C.D. Luis Ángel Firpo	18	8	5	5	25	15	+10	29	Qualify to semifinals
3	C.D. FAS	18	8	5	5	24	17	+7	29	Qualify to semifinals
4	Nejapa F.C.	18	7	8	3	21	17	+4	29	Qualify to semifinals
5	C.D. Águila	18	8	3	7	25	25	0	27	
6	C.D. Chalatenango	18	6	7	5	21	22	−1	25	
7	C.D. Vista Hermosa	18	6	3	9	23	28	−5	21	
8	Alianza F.C.	18	4	7	7	14	17	−3	19	
9	Atlético Balboa	18	3	8	7	18	23	−5	17	
10	Juventud Independiente	18	3	3	12	11	31	−20	12	

=== Playoffs ===
Semifinals
1	A.D. Isidro Metapán	5	1	6
4	Nejapa F.C.	0	0	0
3	C.D. FAS	0	2	2
2	C.D. Luis Ángel Firpo*	0	2	2

Final
1	A.D. Isidro Metapán	1
2	C.D. Luis Ángel Firpo	0

*Note: C.D. Luis Ángel Firpo qualified to the finals due to higher league position.

== Final ==
May 24, 2009

Luis Ángel Firpo	0–1	Isidro Metapán
		José Amaya 58'

Estadio Cuscatlán, San Salvador

Luis Ángel Firpo
GK	1	(El Salvador) Juan José Gómez
DF	3	(El Salvador) Víctor Turcios
DF	15	(El Salvador) Manuel Salazar
DF	5	(El Salvador) Edwin Martínez
DF	20	(El Salvador) Emerson Véliz
MF	14	(El Salvador) Jorge Sánchez
MF	23	(El Salvador) José Campos	(substituted off) 77'
MF	24	(El Salvador) Dennis Alas
MF	4	(El Salvador) Carlos Monteagudo	(substituted off) 57'
FW	18	(El Salvador) Herber Barrera	(substituted off) 63'
FW	11	(Argentina) Fernando Leguizamón
Substitutes:
MF	10	(El Salvador) Francisco Medrano	(substituted on) 57'
FW	7	(Argentina) Patricio Barroche	(substituted on) 63'
FW	12	(Honduras) Pompilio Cacho	(substituted on) 77'
Manager:
(Peru) Agustín Castillo

Isidro Metapán:
GK	17	(El Salvador) Dagoberto Portillo
DF	18	(El Salvador) William Figueroa
DF	13	(El Salvador) Julio Martínez
DF	19	(El Salvador) Alexander Escobar
DF	5	(Honduras) Ernesto Aquino
MF	16	(El Salvador) Ernesto Iraheta
MF	14	(El Salvador) José Amaya
MF	20	(El Salvador) Héctor Mejía
MF	10	(Uruguay) Paolo Suárez	(substituted off) 85'
FW	9	(Panama) Anel Canales	(substituted off) 90+3'
FW	11	(El Salvador) Williams Reyes
Substitutes:
MF	6	(El Salvador) Erick Dowson Prado	(substituted on) 85'
MF	12	(El Salvador) Carlos Menjívar	(substituted on) 90+3'
Manager:
(El Salvador) Edwin Portillo

Clausura Champions 2009

3rd title

Since Isidro Metapán already qualified for 2009–10 CONCACAF Champions League, Luis Ángel Firpo also qualified (originally Apertura 2008 runner-up Chalatenango qualified, but they failed to file the required participation agreement).

== Aggregate table ==
Pos	Team	Pld	W	D	L	GF	GA	GD	Pts	Relegation
1	A.D. Isidro Metapán	35	18	12	5	60	35	+25	66	
2	C.D. Águila	35	17	7	11	62	43	+19	58	
3	C.D. FAS	35	15	11	9	49	38	+11	56	
4	C.D. Chalatenango	35	13	14	8	45	44	+1	53	
5	C.D. Luis Ángel Firpo	35	12	12	11	44	33	+11	48	
6	C.D. Vista Hermosa	35	12	9	14	40	43	−3	45	
7	Nejapa F.C.	35	9	13	13	36	47	−11	40	
8	Atlético Balboa	35	7	16	12	40	49	−9	37	
9	Alianza F.C.	35	7	12	16	31	42	−11	33	Relegation Playoff
10	Juventud Independiente	35	7	10	18	32	64	−32	31	Relegated to Segunda Division

== Top scorers ==
Pos.	Nat.	Player	Team	Goals
1	(Panama)	Nicolás Muñoz	C.D. Vista Hermosa	10
2	(Panama)	Anel Canales	A.D. Isidro Metapán	9
3	(El Salvador)	Williams Reyes	A.D. Isidro Metapán	9
4	(Argentina)	Patricio Barroche	C.D. Luis Ángel Firpo	6
4	(Uruguay)	Alcides Bandera	Atlético Balboa	6
4	(El Salvador)	Carlos Ayala	C.D. Chalatenango	6

== Attendance ==
Attendance	Round	Date	Home	Score	Away	Venue	Weekday	Time of Day
16,647	Final	24 May 2009	C.D. Luis Ángel Firpo	0 – 1	Metapán	Estadio Cuscatlán	Sunday	Afternoon
6,147	Round 18	10 May 2009	Alianza F.C.	2 – 0	Independiente	Estadio Cuscatlán	Sunday	Afternoon
5,152	Semifinal - 2nd leg	16 May 2009	FAS	2 – 2	C.D. Luis Ángel Firpo	Estadio Oscar Quiteño	Saturday	Night
3,700	Round 13	15 April 2009	C.D. Vista Hermosa	3 – 1	Águila	Estadio Correcaminos	Wednesday	Afternoon
3,408	Round 2	7 February 2009	Águila	1 – 0	Alianza	Estadio Juan Francisco Barraza	Saturday	Night
3,363	Round 8	4 May 2009	Alianza F.C.	1 – 1	C.D. FAS	Estadio Cuscatlán	Wednesday	Night
3,338	Round 16	25 April 2009	C.D. Águila	3 – 2	C.D. FAS	Estadio Juan Francisco Barraza	Saturday	Afternoon
3,319	Round 1	31 January 2009	C.D. Luis Ángel Firpo	2 – 1	C.D. Águila	Sergio Torres Stadium	Saturday	Night
3,223	Round 1	1 February 2009	Alianza F.C.	1 – 1	Chalatenango	Estadio Cuscatlán	Sunday	Afternoon
3,186	Round 10	21 March 2009	Águila	2 – 0	Firpo	Estadio Juan Francisco Barraza	Saturday	Night

== Managerial changes ==
=== During the season ===
Team	Outgoing manager	Manner of departure	Date of vacancy	Replaced by	Date of appointment	Position in table
Alianza	(Uruguay) Carlos Jurado	Sacked	February 2009	(Spain) Carlos Cantarero	17 February 2009	9th
Balboa	(Argentina) Carlos de Toro	Sacked	21 February 2009	(El Salvador) Luis Zapata	23 February 2009	9th
Vista Hermosa	(El Salvador) Víctor Coreas	Mutual consent	2 March 2009	(El Salvador) Armando Palma	3 March 2009	9th
Águila	(Argentina) Pablo Centrone	Sacked	19 April 2009	(Brazil) Eraldo Correia	23 April 2009	9th

== List of foreign players in the league ==
This is a list of foreign players in Clausura 2009. The following players:

1. have played at least one Clausura game for the respective club.
2. have not been capped for the El Salvador national football team on any level, independently from the birthplace

each club could have four players

C.D. Águila

- (Mexico) Arturo Albarrán
- (Brazil) Leandro Franco
- (Brazil) José Oliveira
- (Brazil) Marcelo Messias

Alianza F.C.

- (Uruguay) Sebastián Viera
- (Brazil) Juliano de Andrade
- (Brazil) Sandro Zamboni
- (Panama) Francisco Portillo
- (Peru) Manuel Luna

Atlético Balboa

- (Uruguay) Alcides Bandera
- (Honduras) Franklin Webster
- (Colombia) Elder Figueroa

C.D. FAS

- (Colombia) Roberto Peña
- (Paraguay) Osvaldo Mendoza
- (Paraguay) Jeyson Vega

C.D. Luis Ángel Firpo

- (Honduras) Pompilio Cacho
- (Argentina) Patricio Barroche
- (Argentina) Edgar Leguizamón
- (Argentina) Matias Fernández

A.D. Isidro Metapán

- (Panama) Anel Canales
- (Paraguay) Gabriel Garcete
- (Honduras) Ernesto Aquino
- (Uruguay) Paolo Suárez

Nejapa F.C.

- (Argentina) Alejandro Bentos
- (Uruguay) Luis Espindola
- (Colombia) Andrés Aguirre
- (Uruguay) Juan Carlos Reyes

Juventud Independiente

- (Brazil) Paulinho
- (Argentina) Carlos Escalante
- (Colombia) Luis José Pérez
- (Honduras) Néstor Reyes

Vista Hermosa

- (Panama) Nicolás Muñoz
- (Colombia) Luis Torres
- (Honduras) Luciano Harry
- (Peru) Jean Franco Carreño
