= William Torres =

William Torres may refer to:

- William Torres (footballer, born 1976), Salvadoran footballer
- William Torres (footballer, born 1981), Salvadoran footballer
- William Miranda Torres, Puerto Rican politician
