= Erick Prado =

Salvadoran footballer (born 1976)

Personal information
- Full name: Erick Dowson Prado Mélendez
- Date of birth: January 25, 1976 (age 50)
- Place of birth: San Salvador, El Salvador
- Height: 1.89 m (6 ft 2 in)
- Position: Midfielder

Team information
- Current team: El Salvador (Under 20) (Manager)

Youth career
- 1991–1994: ADET

Senior career*
Years	Team	Apps	(Gls)
1994–1996	ADET		
1996–1997	Alianza FC		
1997–1998	ADET		
1999–2000	CD FAS		
2001–2002	CD Atlético Marte		
2002–2011	AD Isidro Metapán		
2008	→ FESA (loan)		

International career
1993–2005	El Salvador	20	(0)

Managerial career
- 2013–2015: Turín FESA FC
- 2015: CD FAS reserves
- 2016–2017: El Salvador (Under 17)
- 2018: CD FAS (assistant)
- 2018–2019: CD FAS
- 2021-2022: Chalatenango
- 2022: Platense
- 2023-2024: Once Deportivo
- 2025: Isidro Metapán
- 2025-2026: El Salvador (Under 20)
- * Club domestic league appearances and goals

Erick Dowson Prado Meléndez (born January 25, 1976) is a retired Salvadoran professional footballer, and the current manager of El Salvador (Under 20).

== Club career ==
=== ADET ===
Prado has had a lengthy career in the Primera División de Fútbol de El Salvador as a defensive midfielder, starting with ADET, with whom he clinched promotion to the top tier, alongside Santos Rivera and Héctor Canjura.

After short spells at Alianza, ADET again, FAS and Atlético Marte, he ended up at Isidro Metapán for whom he played for almost 10 successive years bar a short stint at Segunda División club FESA.

=== Isidro Metapán ===
Skipper of Isidro Metapán, Prado suffered a serious knee injury at the end of the Apertura 2010 tournament and after almost 500 matches in 17 years of professional football, Prado finished his playing career in 2011, to become a coach.

With Isidro Metapán, Dowson Prado won the Clausura 2007, Apertura 2008, Clausura 2009, Clausura 2010 and Apertura 2010.

== Coaching career ==
=== Turín FESA ===
In 2013 Dowson Prado signed as coach of Turín FESA. With Turín FESA Dowson Prado won the Clausura 2012 and Apertura 2014 of the Tercera División.

=== FAS reserves ===
In 2015 he signed as new coach of FAS reserves. With the juvenile team Dowson Prado won the Apertura 2015 tournament de Categoría de Reservas.

=== El Salvador Under-17 ===
In January 2016 Dowson Prado signed as new coach of El Salvador (Under 17), replacing Edgar Henríquez. In May 2017, Dowson Prado was not renewed by the FESFUT.

=== FAS ===
Dowson Prado signed as new coach of FAS for the rest of the Apertura 2018 tournament, replacing Colombian manager Álvaro de Jesús Gómez, who left the team because of family problems. Previously, Dowson Prado worked as an assistant of Álvaro de Jesús Gómez. In November 25, Dowson Prado got to classify FAS for the quarter-finals of the Apertura 2018 tournament, after a 0–0 draw against Isidro Metapán in the Estadio Jorge Calero Suárez.

== International career ==
Prado made his debut for El Salvador in a December 1993 friendly match against the United States and has earned a total of 20 caps, scoring no goals.

He has represented his country in 7 FIFA World Cup qualification matches and played at the 1999 and 2005 UNCAF Nations Cups as well as at the 1996 CONCACAF Gold Cup.

His final international game was a February 2005 UNCAF Nations Cup match against Costa Rica.

== Honours ==
=== Club honours ===
==== As a player ====
- Metapán
  - Primera División de Fútbol de El Salvador (5): Clausura 2007, Apertura 2008, Clausura 2009, Clausura 2010, Apertura 2010

==== As a coach ====
- Once Deportivo
  - Primera División de Fútbol de El Salvador (1): Apertura 2024
- Turín FESA
  - Tercera División (2): Clausura 2012, Apertura 2014
