= Jorge Morán =

Salvadoran footballer (born 1989)

Jorge Luis Morán
Personal information
- Full name: Jorge Luis Morán el culero Rodas
- Date of birth: April 10, 1989 (age 37)
- Place of birth: Coatepeque, El Salvador
- Height: 1.66 m (5 ft 5 in)
- Position: Midfielder

Youth career
- 1998–2002: Academia Cuscachapa
- 2002–2005: Promesas FAS
- 2005–2007: Fundación La Chelona

Senior career*
Years	Team	Apps	(Gls)
2007–2008	Once Municipal		
2008–2012	AD Isidro Metapán		
2012–2019	CD FAS	214	(18)
2018	→ Aguiluchos USA (loan)		
2019–2020	Sonsonate FC		

International career
2008–2009	El Salvador U20		
2010	El Salvador U21		
2016–	El Salvador	4	(1)
- * Club domestic league appearances and goals

Jorge Luis Morán Rodas (born October 4, 1989) is a Salvadoran professional footballer who plays as a midfielder.

== Club career ==
Morán was born in Coatepeque, El Salvador. His professional career began in June 2007 when he signed a contract with Salvadoran national league club, Once Municipal after coming through several youth systems. He made his professional debut on August 11, 2008, in a league match against Isidro Metapán.

Morán signed with Isidro Metapán in 2008. With Isidro Metapán, he played at the 2009–10 CONCACAF Champions League Group Stage.

In 2012, Morán signed with FAS.

== International career ==
In July 2011, Morán was selected for the El Salvador national under-23 football team for the UNCAF U-23 tournament.

== Career statistics ==
=== Club ===
As 2018.

Club	Season	League		League Cup		Continental		Other		Total	
Club	Season	Apps	Goals	Apps	Goals	Apps	Goals	Apps	Goals	Apps	Goals
Once Municipal	Apertura 2007	5	0	–		0	0	0	0	5	0
Once Municipal	Clausura 2008	13	0	–		0	0	0	0	13	0
Isidro Metapán	Apertura 2008	12	0	–		0	0	0	0	12	0
Isidro Metapán	Clausura 2009	1	0	–		0	0	0	0	1	0
Career total		31	0	–		0	0	0	0	31	0

=== International ===
Scores and results list El Salvador's goal tally first.

No.	Date	Venue	Opponent	Score	Result	Competition
1.	10 March 2016	Dennis Martínez National Stadium, Managua, Nicaragua	Nicaragua	1–1	1–1	Friendly

== Honours ==
Isidro Metapán

- Salvadoran Primera División: Apertura 2008, Clausura 2009, Clausura 2010, Apertura 2010, Apertura 2011

FAS

- Salvadoran Primera División runner-up: Clausura 2013, Apertura 2013, Apertura 2015
