= José Osorio =

José Osorio may refer to:

- José Osorio, 9th Duke of Sesto (1825–1909), Spanish nobleman and politician
- José Osorio Navarrete (1894–1948), Chilean lawyer and politician
- José Luis Osorio (born 1980), Mexican footballer
- José Álvaro Osorio Balvín (1985), known professionally as J Balvin, Colombian singer
