= Luis Miguel Hernández =

Salvadoran footballer (born 1985)

Personal information
- Full name: Luis Miguel Hernández Campos
- Date of birth: 9 February 1985 (age 41)
- Place of birth: Chinameca, El Salvador
- Height: 1.82 m (6 ft 0 in)
- Position: Defender

Youth career
- 2000–2002: Águila reserves

Senior career*
Years	Team	Apps	(Gls)
2004–2005	Dragón		
2005–2011	Águila		
2008	→ Atlético Balboa (loan)		
2011–2013	Luis Ángel Firpo		
2013–2017	Dragón	137	(2)

International career
2007–	El Salvador	20	(0)
- * Club domestic league appearances and goals

Luis Miguel Hernández Campos (born 9 February 1985) is a Salvadoran professional footballer.

== Club career ==
=== Águila reserve team ===
Hernández was formed in the Águila reserve team since 2000. With Águila, Hernández lost the Apertura 2009 and Clausura 2010 finals against FAS (2–3 defeat) and Isidro Metapán (1–3 defeat), respectively.

=== Dragón ===
Hernández signed with Dragón in 2004.

=== Águila ===
Hernández rejoined Águila in 2005 and was loaned out to Atlético Balboa for the Apertura 2008.

=== Loan to Atlético Balboa ===
With Atlético Balboa, Hernández finished seventh in the league table with 20 points in the Apertura 2008.

=== Luis Ángel Firpo ===
Hernández signed with Luis Ángel Firpo in 2011. He scored in a 4–3 victory against UES, in April 2012.

=== Return to Dragón ===
Hernández signed again with Dragón in 2013. With Dragón, Hernández reached the Clausura 2014 final, but they lost against Isidro Metapán on penalties.

He scored a crucial goal in a 2–2 draw against FAS in the Estadio Juan Francisco Barraza, in October 2015.

Again Dragón reached a final in the Clausura 2016, this time they defeated Águila 1–0, winning the national league title. Hernández was separated from the team in July 2017.

== International career ==
Hernández made his debut for El Salvador in an October 2007 friendly match against Costa Rica and has, by June 2011, earned a total of 20 caps scoring no goals. He has represented his country in 4 FIFA World Cup qualification matches as well as at the 2009 UNCAF Nations Cup and the 2009 CONCACAF Gold Cup.
