= Erick Corrales =

Costa Rican footballer (born 1984)

Personal information
- Full name: Erick Alberto Corrales Barrantes
- Date of birth: 1 November 1984
- Place of birth: San José, Costa Rica
- Date of death: 11 July 2025 (aged 40)
- Place of death: Washington, D.C., United States
- Height: 1.75 m (5 ft 9 in)
- Position: Forward

Senior career*
Years	Team	Apps	(Gls)
2003–2005	Saprissa		
2006	Cartaginés		
2008–2009	Barrio México		
2009	Nejapa	12	(0)
2010–2012	Belén Siglo XXI	7	(1)
2013	Barrio México		
2014	Juventud Escazuceña		
2017	Municipal Grecia		
- * Club domestic league appearances and goals

Erick Alberto Corrales Barrantes (1 November 1984 – 11 July 2025) was a Costa Rican striker who played for Municipal Grecia.

== Club career ==
In 2009 Corrales moved abroad for a stint at Salvadoran side Nejapa. In August 2013, La China returned to Barrio Mexico.
