= Ramón Martínez (footballer, born 1981) =

Salvadoran footballer

Ramón Martinez
Personal information
- Full name: Ramón Martínez De Paz
- Date of birth: 10 February 1981 (age 45)
- Place of birth: Usulután, El Salvador
- Height: 1.75 m (5 ft 9 in)
- Position: Defender

Senior career*
Years	Team	Apps	(Gls)
- Municipal
2000–2009	CD Chalatenango		
2009	CD Municipal Limeño		
2009–2010	Nejapa FC		
2010	Atlético Balboa		
2010–2012	CD UES	27	(0)
2012–2013	Alianza FC	30	(0)
2013–2014	CD Luis Ángel Firpo	38	(2)
2014	CD Marte Soyapango	18	(1)
2015–2016	Alianza FC	44	(1)
2016	CD Chalatenango	13	(0)
2016–2017	Independiente FC		
- * Club domestic league appearances and goals

Ramón Martínez de Paz (born 10 February 1981) is a Salvadoran former professional footballer who played as a defender.

== Club career ==
Martínez was born in Usulután, El Salvador. He played nine years for Chalatenango.

In the grand final of the Apertura 2015 tournament, Martínez scored the only goal of the game against FAS (1–0) giving victory to his team Alianza and also the national championship.
