= Enar Bolaños =

Costa Rican footballer (born 1983)

Personal information
- Full name: Enar Andrés Bolaños Cascante
- Date of birth: July 18, 1983 (age 43)
- Place of birth: San José, Costa Rica
- Height: 1.82 m (6 ft 0 in)
- Position: Forward

Senior career*
Years	Team	Apps	(Gls)
1999–2009	Barrio Mexico		
2010	Alacranes Del Norte		
2011	Turrialba		
2011	Orión		
2013	Chirripó		
2013–2015	Santo Domingo		
- * Club domestic league appearances and goals

Enar Andrés Bolaños Cascante (born July 18, 1983) is a Costa Rican striker.

== Club career ==
Bolaños played from 1999 to 2009 for Barrio Mexico, before moving abroad to join Salvadoran side Alacranes Del Norte in January 2010. In June 2011 he was snapped up by Orión, but had to leave them a few months later and he later moved to Chirripó, both in the Costa Rican lower divisions.
