= Javier Alejandro Rabbia =

Argentine footballer

Personal information
- Full name: Javier Alejandro Rabbia
- Date of birth: September 21, 1983 (age 43)
- Place of birth: Pilar, Argentina
- Position: Midfielder

Senior career*
Years	Team	Apps	(Gls)
2003–2005	Fénix		
2005–2008	Villa Dálmine		
2009–2010	Titán		
2010	Atlético Balboa		
2011–	Once Lobos		
- * Club domestic league appearances and goals

Javier Alejandro Rabbia (born 21 September 1983 in Pilar, Argentina) is an Argentine footballer. He currently plays as a midfielder for Atlético Balboa.
