= Polideportivo Vitoria-Gasteiz =

Sports complex in Nejapa, El Salvador

Coordinates: 13.8175°N 89.2284°W

Estadio Vitoria Gasteiz
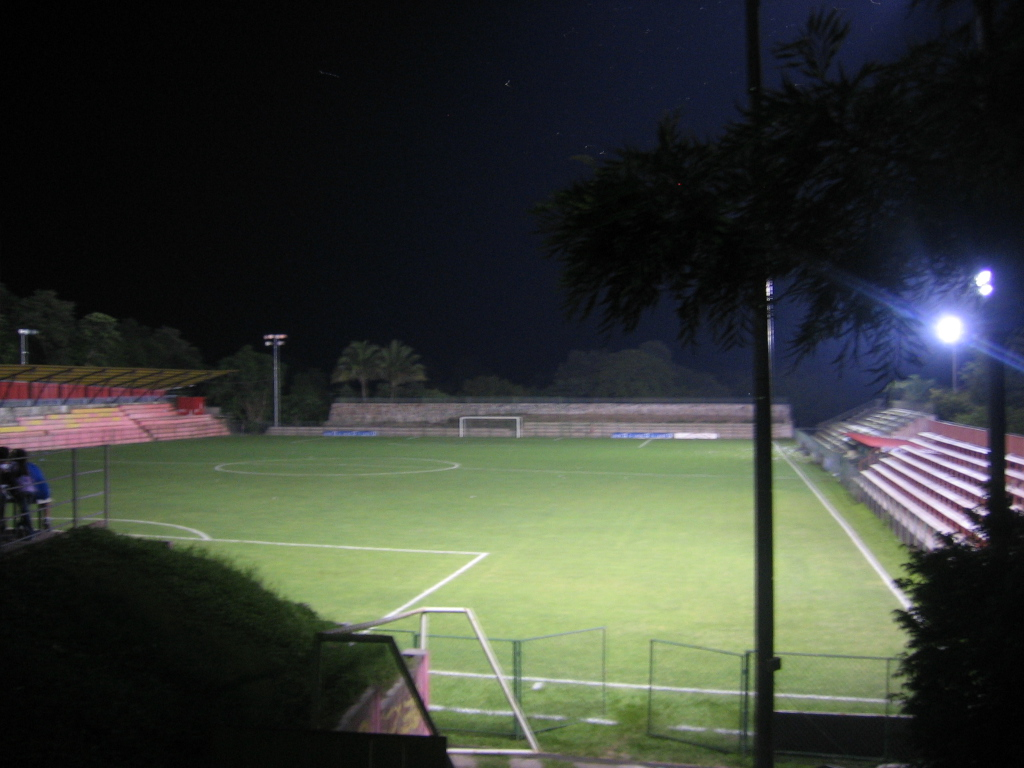
- Interactive map of Estadio Vitoria Gasteiz
- Location: Nejapa, El Salvador
- Capacity: 2,000 (football)
- Surface: Grass

Website
- https://nejapa.wordpress.com/

Polideportivo Vitoria-Gasteiz is a multi-use sports complex located in Nejapa, in the departamento of San Salvador in El Salvador.

The stadium has a capacity of 2,000.

It is named after the town of Vitoria-Gasteiz in Spain.

== History ==
The soccer facility used to be the home field for the football club Alacranes Del Norte, a first division soccer team which no longer exists.
