= Daniel Uberti =

Uruguayan footballer and manager (born 1963)

Personal information
- Full name: Enrique Daniel Uberti García
- Date of birth: 11 August 1963 (age 63)
- Place of birth: Montevideo, Uruguay
- Position: Defender

Senior career*
Years	Team	Apps	(Gls)
1983–1985	Danubio		
1987, 1997–1999	Isidro Metapán		
1988–1989	Real España	23	(7)
1992–1995	Real España	67	(15)
1995–1996	Independiente	9	(1)
1985–1988	Comunicaciones		
1991–1992	Atlético Marte		
1990–1992	FAS		
1996–1997	Atlético Marte		
1997	Luis Ángel Firpo		

International career
- Uruguay U-20

Managerial career
- 2004: San Salvador
- 2007–2008: Real España
- 2008–2009: Nejapa
- 2015-2017: Real España (Sports Director)
- 2017-2019: Santa Tecla (Sports Director)
- 2019-2024: Honduras (Sports Coordinator for Youth)
- * Club domestic league appearances and goals as of 3 March 2012

Enrique Daniel Uberti Garcia (born 11 August 1963) is a Uruguayan former football player and manager.
