= Carlos Ayala (footballer) =

Salvadoran footballer (born 1982)

Personal information
- Full name: Carlos Ernesto Ayala Amaya
- Date of birth: December 23, 1982 (age 43)
- Place of birth: Soyapango, El Salvador
- Height: 1.69 m (5 ft 7 in)
- Position: Forward

Senior career*
Years	Team	Apps	(Gls)
2000–2005	Coca Cola		
2005–2006	Independiente Nacional 1906		
2007–2009	Chalatenango		
2007–2008	→ Platense (loan)		
2009–2011	Alianza		
2012–2013	Luis Ángel Firpo		
2013–2014	UES		
2015	Atlético Marte		
2015–2016	Chalatenango		
2016–2017	Topiltzín		

International career
2009	El Salvador	5	(1)
- * Club domestic league appearances and goals

Carlos Ernesto Ayala Amaya (born December 23, 1982) is a Salvadoran former professional footballer who played as a forward.

== Club career ==
Ayala started his career at Second Division side Coca-Cola, later renamed as Independiente Nacional 1906. He made his debut in the Premier Division with Chalatenango and joined Alianza in 2009.

== International career ==
Ayala received his first call up to the El Salvador national team in December 2008, after impressing head coach Carlos de los Cobos during the Apertura 2008 season where he finished as the league's leading scorer.

He officially received his first cap on January 22, 2009 in a UNCAF Nations Cup game against Nicaragua. He scored his first goal on January 24, 2009 in a UNCAF Nations Cup game against Belize.

== Career statistics ==
Scores and results list El Salvador's goal tally first.

#	Date	Venue	Opponent	Score	Result	Competition
1	24 January 2009	Estadio Tiburcio Carías Andino, Tegucigalpa, Honduras	Belize	4–1	4–1	UNCAF Nations Cup
