= Mario Benítez (footballer) =

Colombian footballer (born 1983)

Personal information
- Full name: Mario Alejandro Benítez Valencia
- Date of birth: August 17, 1983 (age 43)
- Place of birth: Belalcazar, Colombia
- Height: 1.84 m (6 ft 0 in)
- Position: Forward

Team information
- Current team: Club El Porvenir

Senior career*
Years	Team	Apps	(Gls)
2002	Atlético Huila		
2002	Once Caldas		
2003	Envigado		
2004	Atlético Huila		
2004	Cúcuta Deportivo		
2005	Millonarios	1	(1)
2005	Independiente Santa Fe	3	(1)
2006	Atlético Huila	1	(0)
2007	Portuguesa Fútbol Club	2	(2)
2008	Guaros		
2008	El Porvenir	8	(0)
2009	Real Cartagena		
2009–2010	Luis Ángel Firpo	2	(2)
2010–2011	El Porvenir		
2012–2013	Al Shabab		
- * Club domestic league appearances and goals

Mario Alejandro Benítez Valencia (born August 17, 1983) is a Colombian footballer who last played for Al Shabab of Saudi Arabia.
