= Pablo Centrone =

Argentine football manager

Personal information
- Full name: Pablo Enrique Centrone
- Date of birth: 10 November 1957 (age 68)
- Place of birth: Buenos Aires, Argentina
- Position: Centre-back

Senior career*
Years	Team	Apps	(Gls)
1965–1974	Chacarita Juniors	2	(0)
1977	Estudiantes de Buenos Aires	9	(0)
1980	Rochester Lancers		
198?–1981	Deportivo italiano		

Managerial career
- 1989–1990: Atlanta
- 1990–1991: Deportivo Italiano
- 1994–1995: Club América
- 1995–1996: Independiente Santa Fe
- 2001: Veracruz
- 2001–2003: Club León
- 2004: Zacatepec
- 2004: Atlante Neza
- 2005–2006: Deportivo Italiano
- 2007–2008: Alianza
- 2009: Águila
- 2010–2011: Peñarol La Mesilla
- 2012–2016: Petapa
- 2018: Sanarate
- 2020: Santa Lucía
- 2022: Chacarita Juniors
- 2023–: Xinabajul
- * Club domestic league appearances and goals

Pablo Enrique Centrone (born 10 November 1957 in Buenos Aires) is an Argentine football manager and former player who manages Liga Nacional club Xinabajul.

== Managerial career ==
Centrone has worked as a manager in Mexico with clubs such as Atlante F.C. and CD Veracruz.
