= Mario Aguilar (footballer) =

Salvadoran footballer (born 1984)

Personal information
- Full name: Mario Edgardo Aguilar Posadas
- Date of birth: July 31, 1984 (age 42)
- Place of birth: Metapán, El Salvador
- Height: 1.77 m (5 ft 10 in)
- Positions: Defender; midfielder

Team information
- Current team: Isidro Metapán
- Number: 8

Senior career*
Years	Team	Apps	(Gls)
2001–2012	Isidro Metapán		
2012	C.D. Titan		

International career^{‡}
2008	El Salvador	2	(0)
- * Club domestic league appearances and goals ‡ National team caps and goals as of 3 October 2010

Mario Edgardo Aguilar Posadas (born July 31, 1984 in Metapán) is a Salvadoran footballer who currently plays for Isidro Metapán in the Primera División de Fútbol de El Salvador.

== Club career ==
A holding midfielder or central defender, Aguilar has played his entire football career for his hometown club Isidro Metapán.

== International career ==
Aguilar made his debut for El Salvador as a late substitute in an October 2008 FIFA World Cup qualification match against Haiti which proved to be his only international up until October 2010.
