= Andrés Medina =

Colombian footballer (born 1978)

Personal information
- Full name: Andrés Medina Aguirre
- Date of birth: 23 March 1978 (age 48)
- Place of birth: Barranquilla, Colombia
- Height: 1.80 m (5 ft 11 in)
- Position: Defender

Senior career*
Years	Team	Apps	(Gls)
1995–1997	Cortuluá		
1997–1998	Coronel Bolognesi		
1999	C.D. Condor		
2000–2001	Alianza Petrolera		
2002–2004	Tauros		
2004–2006	Nejapa		
2007	San Salvador		
2009	Nejapa	19	(4)
2009	Santa Tecla		
2010	Brasilia Suchitoto	2	(0)
2010	Once Municipal		
2011	Atlético Balboa		(1)
2011	Once Municipal		
2012	Vendaval		
2013	Topiltzin		
- * Club domestic league appearances and goals as of January 2007

Andrés Medina Aguirre (born 23 March 1978) is a Colombian former professional football played as a defender.
