= Paulinho (footballer, born 1981) =

Brazilian footballer

Paulinho (Paulo Rodriguez)
Personal information
- Full name: Paulo César Rodrigues Lima
- Date of birth: June 10, 1981 (age 45)
- Place of birth: ?, Bahia, Brazil
- Height: 1.82 m (6 ft 0 in)
- Position: Right winger

Team information
- Current team: Aspirante

Senior career*
Years	Team	Apps	(Gls)
- Marília
- Iraty
- Paraná
- Losani F.C.
- Nion F.C.
?–2001	Batel		
2005–2006	San Salvador F.C.		
2004	Luis Ángel Firpo		
2005	Once Municipal		
2007	Brujas		
2008	FAS	6	(1)
2009	Juventud Independiente	16	(1)
2009–2012	Aspirante		
2013	C.D. Pasaquina		
- * Club domestic league appearances and goals

Paulo Cesar Rodriguez, best known as Paulinho (born June 10, 1981) is a Brazilian football right winger, currently playing for C.D. Aspirante of El Salvador.
