= Gustavo Méndes =

Brazilian footballer (born 1981)

Personal information
- Full name: Gustavo Méndes Nunes
- Date of birth: October 11, 1981 (age 45)
- Place of birth: Espírito Santo, Brazil
- Position: Forward

Senior career*
| Years | Team | Apps | (Gls) |
| 2008 | São Mateus | | |
| 2008 | Alianza | | (4) |
| 2009 | Grêmio Laranjeiras | | |
| 2009 | Isidro Metapán | 5 | (1) |
- * Club domestic league appearances and goals

Gustavo Méndes Nunes (born October 11, 1981, in Brazil) is a Brazilian footballer.

== Club career ==
He has played for A.D. Isidro Metapán in El Salvador.
