= Alexander Amaya =

Salvadoran footballer (born 1975)

Personal information
- Full name: José Alexander Amaya del Cid
- Date of birth: January 4, 1975 (age 51)
- Place of birth: San Salvador, El Salvador
- Height: 1.83 m (6 ft 0 in)
- Position: Midfielder

Senior career*
Years	Team	Apps	(Gls)
1997–1999	Águila		
2000	Beijing Guoan	3	(0)
2001–2005	Águila		
2006–2009	Isidro Metapán	31	(3)
2007	→ Estudiantes (loan)		
2009–2010	Alianza	11	(0)

International career
1997–2004	El Salvador	26	(1)

Managerial career
- 2021–2023: CD Águila (sport director)
- * Club domestic league appearances and goals

José Alexander Amaya del Cid (born January 4, 1975, in San Salvador, El Salvador) is a retired Salvadoran professional footballer.

== Club career ==
Amaya started his professional career with Águila during the 1997–1998 season. He remained there until 1999. He was signed by former El Salvador manager Milovan Đorić's Chinese club side Beijing Guoan in 2000. He participated in both the Chinese First Division league and the Philip FA Cup 2000. After 2000, he returned to El Salvador winning the Clausura title with Águila. However a combination of poor form and injuries caused him to lose his spot in the Águila squad.

In 2006, del Cid signed with Isidro Metapán and remained there until 2009. He signed with Alianza in 2009.

== International career ==
Amaya made his debut for El Salvador in a March 1997 friendly match against Guatemala and has earned a total of 42 caps, scoring 1 goal. He has represented his country in 9 FIFA World Cup qualification matches and played at several UNCAF Cups. He also was a non-playing squad member at the 1998 CONCACAF Gold Cup.

His final international game was a May 2004 friendly match against Haiti.

=== International goals ===
Scores and results list El Salvador's goal tally first.

#	Date	Venue	Opponent	Score	Result	Competition
1	7 September 1997	Giants Stadium, East Rutherford, New Jersey, US	Colombia	1-0	2-2	Friendly match

== Post-football career ==
Amaya joined the Canal 21 crew, he will become a football analyzer, talking about issues and announcing games that are played. He is currently the U16 coach of a school in El Salvador.
