= Jeyson Vega =

Paraguayan footballer (born 1983)

Personal information
- Full name: Jeyson Joel Vega Duarte
- Date of birth: 12 July 1983 (age 43)
- Place of birth: Asunción, Paraguay
- Height: 1.70 m (5 ft 7 in)
- Position: Midfielder

Youth career
- 1996–2001: Cerro Porteño

Senior career*
Years	Team	Apps	(Gls)
2001–2006	Cerro Porteño		
2007	12 de Octubre		
2007–2008	Club Silvio Pettirossi		
2008	FAS		
2009	Sportivo Trinidense		
2010	FAS	12	(2)
- * Club domestic league appearances and goals as of 25 April 2010

Jeyson Joel Vega Duarte (born 12 July 1983) is a Paraguayan football midfielder.

== Club career ==
He last played for FAS of El Salvador.
