= Elder Figueroa =

Colombian-Salvadoran footballer (born 1980)

Personal information
- Full name: Elder José Figueroa Sarmiento
- Date of birth: October 14, 1980 (age 46)
- Place of birth: Riohacha, Colombia
- Height: 1.83 m (6 ft 0 in)
- Position: Defender

Senior career*
Years	Team	Apps	(Gls)
2000	Real Cartagena		
2001	Expreso Rojo		
2001	Juventud 72		
2002	Inca Súper Flat		
2003	UDET		
2004	Fuerte San Francisco		
2005–2008	Vista Hermosa	99	(5)
2009	Atlético Balboa	16	(1)
2009, 2012	Alianza	10	(0)
2010	Aspirante		
2010–2012	Once Municipal	33	(5)
2012–2015	FAS	50	(2)
2015–2016	Chalatenango		
2016–2017	Once Municipal	0	(0)

International career
2012	El Salvador	6	(0)
- * Club domestic league appearances and goals

Elder José Figueroa Sarmiento (born October 14, 1980) is a Colombian and naturalized Salvadoran former footballer who played as a defender.

Figueroa became a naturalized citizen of El Salvador in 2011, and received his first call-up to the El Salvador national team a year later.
