= Dagoberto Portillo =

Salvadoran footballer (born 1979)

Personal information
- Full name: Dagoberto Portillo Gamero
- Date of birth: November 16, 1979 (age 46)
- Place of birth: San Salvador, El Salvador
- Height: 1.82 m (6 ft 0 in)
- Position: Goalkeeper

Senior career*
Years	Team	Apps	(Gls)
1999–2001	Alianza		
2001–2003	Luis Ángel Firpo		
2003–2004	Chalatenango		
2004–2006	Isidro Metapán		
2006–2008	Alianza		
2008–2009	Isidro Metapán	33	(1)
2009–2010	FAS	33	(0)
2010–2011	Once Municipal		(3)
2011–2013	Luis Ángel Firpo	67	(0)

International career^{‡}
1995	El Salvador U20		
- El Salvador U21
- El Salvador U23
2002–2013	El Salvador	22	(0)
- * Club domestic league appearances and goals as of 6 January 2011 ‡ National team caps and goals as of 9 February 2011

Dagoberto Portillo Gamero (born November 16, 1979) is a Salvadoran former football goalkeeper. He was banned for life in 2013, for match fixing while playing for the El Salvador national football team.

== Career ==
=== Club ===
He began his football career with Alianza in 1999. In 2001, he transferred to Luís Ángel Firpo where he remained until 2003. That same year he was transferred to C.D. Chalatenango, with whom he played for the Clausura 2004. For the Apertura 2004, he arrived at Isidro Metapán, for whom he played until 2006, until he rejoined with Alianza again. For the Apertura 2008, Portillo returned to form part of the Isidro Metapán squad. He later would go on to join FAS for the Apertura 2009 before leaving to Once Municipal for the Apertura 2010. Though he returned to Luís Ángel Firpo for the 2011 season and has remained there ever since.

=== International ===
Dagoberto Portillo began his international career with El Salvador's U20 national team in 1995. Through the years, he also went on to form part of the El Salvador's U21 and U23 teams. He made his debut with the senior team in a March 2007 friendly match against Honduras, under then coach Carlos de los Cobos. During his career in the senior team, he was injured numerous times; one game against Costa Rica in 2010 led him to the hospital.

On September 20, 2013, Portillo was one of 14 Salvadoran players banned for life due to their involvement with match fixing while playing for the national team.
