= Hermes Martínez =

Colombian footballer (born 1979)

Personal information
- Full name: Hermes Martínez Misal
- Date of birth: September 23, 1979 (age 47)
- Place of birth: Valledupar, Cesar, Colombia
- Height: 1.87 m (6 ft 2 in)
- Position: Defender

Senior career*
| Years | Team | Apps | (Gls) |
| 2001–2002 | Millonarios | | |
| 2002 | Alianza | | |
| 2003 | Millonarios | | |
| 2004 | Valledupar | | |
| 2005 | Alianza | | |
| 2006 | San Salvador | | |
| 2007 | Luis Ángel Firpo | | |
| 2008 | Chalatenango | | |
| 2009–2010 | Águila | 39 | (4) |
| 2010 | Luis Ángel Firpo | 18 | (2) |
- * Club domestic league appearances and goals as of December 12, 2010

Hermes Martínez Misal (born September 23, 1979) is a Colombian professional soccer player.
