= William Torres (footballer, born 1981) =

Salvadoran professional football player (born 1981)

Personal information
- Full name: William Antonio Torres Cabrera
- Date of birth: May 30, 1981 (age 45)
- Place of birth: San Salvador, El Salvador
- Position: Defender

Team information
- Current team: Once Municipal
- Number: 3

Youth career
- 1999: Academia Chelona

Senior career*
Years	Team	Apps	(Gls)
2000–2002	Alianza		
2003–2007	San Salvador F.C.		
2008–2011	Águila		
2011-2012	UES		
2012-2012	Once Municipal		

International career^{‡}
2002–2007	El Salvador	30	(0)
- * Club domestic league appearances and goals as of July 2011 ‡ National team caps and goals as of February 2007

William Antonio Torres Cabrera (born May 30, 1981 in San Salvador, El Salvador) is a Salvadoran professional football player, who currently plays as a defender for Once Municipal in the Primera División de Fútbol de El Salvador.

== Club career ==
Nicknamed Pichuta, Torres Cabrera started his professional career at local giants Alianza in 2000 and moved to newly formed San Salvador F.C. in 2003. He then left the club before it was disbanded and joined Águila in 2008. In 2011, he moved back to the capital to play for UES whom he had to leave at the end of a miserable season and he signed up with Once Municipal for the 2012 Clausura.

== International career ==
Torres Cabrera was a gold medal winner at the 2002 Central American and Caribbean Games, a tournament for U-21 national teams, and made his senior debut for El Salvador in a November 2002 friendly match against the United States and has earned a total of 30 caps, scoring no goals. He has represented his country in 3 FIFA World Cup qualification matches and played at the 2003, and 2007 UNCAF Nations Cups as well as at the 2003 CONCACAF Gold Cup.

His final international game was a March 2007 friendly match against Honduras.
