= Alexander Escobar =

Salvadoran footballer (born 1984)

Personal information
- Full name: Alexander Escobar Rosales
- Date of birth: April 4, 1984 (age 42)
- Place of birth: Metapán, El Salvador
- Height: 1.78 m (5 ft 10 in)
- Position: Defender

Youth career
- 1999–2000: C.D. San Francisco Junior

Senior career*
Years	Team	Apps	(Gls)
2001–2012	A.D. Isidro Metapán	318	(31)
2013	Alianza F.C.	2	(0)

International career^{‡}
1998–2000	El Salvador U17		
2000–2002	El Salvador U20		
2002–2011	El Salvador	34	(0)
- * Club domestic league appearances and goals ‡ National team caps and goals as of March 3, 2010

Alexander Escobar Rosales (born April 4, 1984) is a Salvadoran footballer who has played for the El Salvador national team.

== Club career ==
He played in the C.D. San Francisco Junior youth teams and has played all of his professional career at A.D. Isidro Metapán, since making his debut in 2001.

== International career ==
Nicknamed la Rastra, Escobar made his debut for El Salvador in a January 2003 friendly match against Guatemala and has, as of December 2010, earned a total of 34 caps, scoring no goals. He has represented his country in 7 FIFA World Cup qualification matches and played at the 2003 and 2009 UNCAF Nations Cups as well as at the 2007 and 2009 CONCACAF Gold Cups.
