= Francisco Portillo (footballer, born 1981) =

Panamanian footballer

Francisco Alejando Portillo Bautista
Personal information
- Full name: Francisco Alejandro Portillo Bautista
- Date of birth: February 25, 1981 (age 45)
- Place of birth: Panama
- Height: 1.80 m (5 ft 11 in)
- Position: Goalkeeper

Team information
- Current team: Atlético Nacional

Youth career
- Sporting San Miguelito

Senior career*
Years	Team	Apps	(Gls)
1997–1998	Sporting San Miguelito		
2002–2003	San Francisco		
2004–2006	Árabe Unido		
2007	Once Municipal		
2008	San Salvador	6	(0)
2008–2009	Alianza	27	(0)
2010–2012	Sporting San Miguelito	33	(0)
2013–2015	Atlético Nacional		

International career
2001–2004	Panama	4	(0)
- * Club domestic league appearances and goals

Francisco Alejandro Bautista Portillo (born 25 January 1981) is a Panamanian footballer, who currently plays for Atlético Nacional.

== Club career ==
He started his career at Sporting 89 and played for various local sides before embarking on a career abroad, playing several years in Salvadoran football. He joined Once Municipal in February 2007 and in January 2008 moved to ambitious capital club San Salvador, only to leave them for Alianza in July 2008.

He returned to Panama in January 2010 to play for his first ever club Sporting San Miguelito again and later joined Second Division side Atlético Nacional. In November 2013, he saved two SUNTRACS penalties to earn his side a place in the 2nd division championship final, but they eventually missed out on promotion to Atlético Chiriquí.

== International career ==
Portillo made his debut for Panama in an August 2001 friendly match against Brazil in which he came on as a last-minute substitute for Óscar McFarlane and has earned a total of 4 caps, scoring no goals.

His final international was a March 2004 friendly match against Cuba.

In 2015, Portillo was named in the Panama national beach soccer team.
