= Luis Fernando Espindola =

Uruguayan footballer (born 1975)

Personal information
- Full name: Luis Fernando Espindola Sauchuk
- Date of birth: 28 June 1975 (age 51)
- Place of birth: Montevideo, Uruguay
- Height: 1.86 m (6 ft 1 in)
- Position: Defender

Senior career*
Years	Team	Apps	(Gls)
1994–1995	Basañez		
1995–1999	Nacional Montevideo		
2000	Fénix		
2001	Cerro Porteño		
2002	Blooming		
2004	Alianza		
2005	Public Bank FC		
2006	Malacca FA		
2007–2008	San Salvador F.C.		
2008–2010	Nejapa		
2010	Once Municipal		
- * Club domestic league appearances and goals

Luis Fernando Espindola (born 28 June 1975) is a Uruguayan former professional footballer who played as a defender.

== Career ==
Espindola began his professional journey with Nacional in 1995, he later played for Fénix and Rentistas in the Primera División in 2000. In 2001, he played for Porteño Hill in Paraguay and Blooming in Bolivia. He later joined FC Alliance in El Salvador (2003–2004) before moving to Malaysia, where he played for Public Bank FC in 2005 Malacca FA in 2006. Returning to El Salvador, he signed with San Salvador FC (2006–2007), Nejapa FC (2007–2008), and Municipal Eleven (2009–2010).

In addition to his playing career, Espindola held leadership roles with FC Alliance in El Salvador for five consecutive seasons, from 2020–11 through 2014–15. He was the head of sports at Alianza F.C. from 2010–11 to 2014–15.
