= Gabriel Garcete =

Paraguayan footballer (born 1982)

Personal information
- Full name: Gabriel Garcete Jimenez
- Date of birth: 7 January 1982 (age 44)
- Place of birth: Yegros, Caazapá, Paraguay
- Height: 1.74 m (5 ft 9 in)
- Position: Forward

Senior career*
Years	Team	Apps	(Gls)
2000–2004	Sportivo Luqueño		
2005	Municipal Limeño		
2005	Atlético Balboa		
2006	Chalatenango		
2006	FAS		
2007	Sportivo Luqueño		
2007	General Caballero ZC		
2008–2009	Isidro Metapán		
2009	Municipal Limeño		
2010	Isidro Metapán		
2010	UES		
2011	Once Lobos		
2012–2013	Isidro Metapán		
2014	Sacachispas		
2014–2015	Deportivo Guastatoya	21	(4)
2016–2017	Leones de Occidente		
- * Club domestic league appearances and goals

Gabriel Garcete Jimenez (born 7 January 1982) is a Paraguayan former professional footballer who played as a forward.

He started his career with Sportivo Luqueño in 2000. The next season, he moved on to play for Municipal Limeño. In 2005, he made a transfer to Atlético Balboa. He went on to play for Chalatenango of El Salvador after.

In 2007 Garcete returned to Sportivo Luqueño. The next season, he returned to El Salvador to join FAS in the Primera División de Fútbol Profesional of El Salvador, but was later released.

In 2008, he joined Isidro Metapán in El Salvador.

In 2010, he joined UES however he did not live up to expectations and was released by the club.
