= Roberto Carlos Peña =

Colombian footballer (born 1984)

Personal information
- Full name: Roberto Carlos Peña Grueso
- Date of birth: March 1, 1984 (age 42)
- Place of birth: Cali, Colombia
- Height: 1.77 m (5 ft 10 in)
- Position: Defender

Senior career*
Years	Team	Apps	(Gls)
2004	Deportes Quindío		
2005	Colima		
2005–2007	Columbí		
2007–2008	Aston Villa		
2009–2011	FAS	?	(13)
2012–2013	Marquense	62	(5)
2013	Malacateco	22	(1)
2014	Coatepeque	23	(2)
2014–2018	Antigua	175	(19)
2019	Chimaltenango	0	(0)
- * Club domestic league appearances and goals

Roberto Carlos Peña Grueso (born March 1, 1984) is a Colombian footballer.
