= Juliano Rangel =

Brazilian footballer

Personal information
- Full name: Juliano Rangel de Andrade
- Date of birth: April 4, 1982 (age 44)
- Place of birth: Alfredo Chaves-ES, Brazil
- Height: 1.86 m (6 ft 1 in)
- Position: Defender

Team information
- Current team: Sanarate

Senior career*
| Years | Team | Apps | (Gls) |
| 1999 | Fluminense | | |
| 1999–2001 | Olaria | | |
| 2002–2003 | Altamira | | |
| 2004–2005 | Tigres B | | |
| 2006 | Morelia B | | |
| 2007–2008 | Deportes Savio | 7 | (0) |
| 2009 | Alianza | 29 | (2) |
| 2010 | Luis Ángel Firpo | 18 | (0) |
| 2010–2013 | Marquense | 125 | (10) |
| 2013–2016 | Xelajú | 116 | (13) |
| 2016–2017 | Petapa | 76 | (7) |
| 2018 | USAC | | |
| 2018-2019 | Rosario | | |
| 2019-2021 | Achuapa | 25 | (2) |
| 2021- | Sanarate | 5 | (0) |
- * Club domestic league appearances and goals as of May 9, 2010

Juliano Rangel de Andrade (born April 4, 1982 in Alfredo Chaves) is a Brazilian football defender, who plays for Primera División club Sanarate.

== Club career ==
Rangel played for lower league sides in his native Brazil and in Mexico before joining Salvadoran side Deportes Savio in 2007. He then also played for Alianza and LA Firpo before crossing borders again to join Marquense.

== Career statistics ==
=== Club ===
| Team | Season | Games | Start | Sub | Goal | YC | RC |
|---|---|---|---|---|---|---|---|
| Deportes Savio | 2008–09 A | 15 | 15 | 0 | 1 | 5 | 1 |
| Alianza | Clausura 2009 | 14 | 14 | 0 | 1 | 3 | 2 |
| Alianza | Apertura 2009 | 15 | 15 | 0 | 1 | 3 | 0 |
| Luis Ángel Firpo | Clausura 2010 | 18 | | | 0 | 7 | 1 |
