= José Gregorio Martínez Stadium =

Stadium in Chalatenango, El Salvador

Estadio Gregorio Martínez
- El Sombrero "The Sombrero"
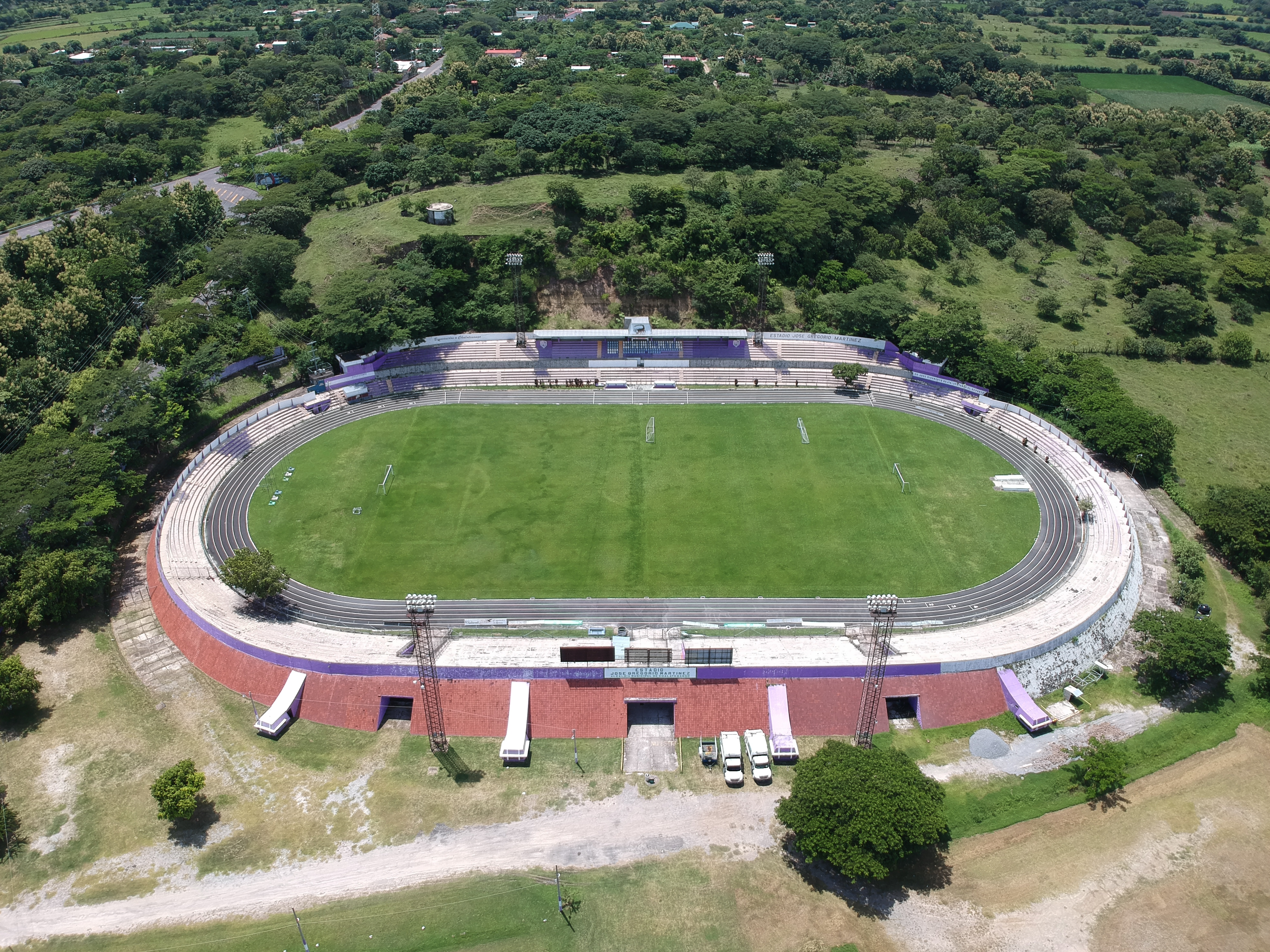
- Interactive map of Estadio Gregorio Martínez
- Full name: Estadio Olympico José Gregorio Martínez
- Location: Chalatenango, El Salvador
- Coordinates: 14°02′34″N 88°58′05″W
- Owner: INDES
- Operator: Municipal government of Chalatenango
- Capacity: 15,000
- Surface: Lawn
- Scoreboard: by hand
- Record attendance: 18,000 concert
- Field size: 105 m × 70 m (344 ft × 230 ft)
- Field shape: lawn and French drain

Construction
- Groundbreaking: 1970
- Built: 1974
- Opened: January 1975
- Renovated: 2009 - 2010
- Cost: 500,000 Colones
- Project manager: José Gregorio Martínez
- General contractor: General Carlos Humberto Romero

Tenants
- Chalatenango; Atlético Comapala; Alacranes del Norte (former)

Website
- www.chalatenango.gob.sv

The José Gregorio Martínez Stadium (Spanish: Estadio José Gregorio Martínez) is a multi-use stadium located in the city of Chalatenango, El Salvador. Specifically in the Km 72 ½ mile of the road leading from San Salvador to the provincial capital, is used for football, where the local team Chalatenango plays.

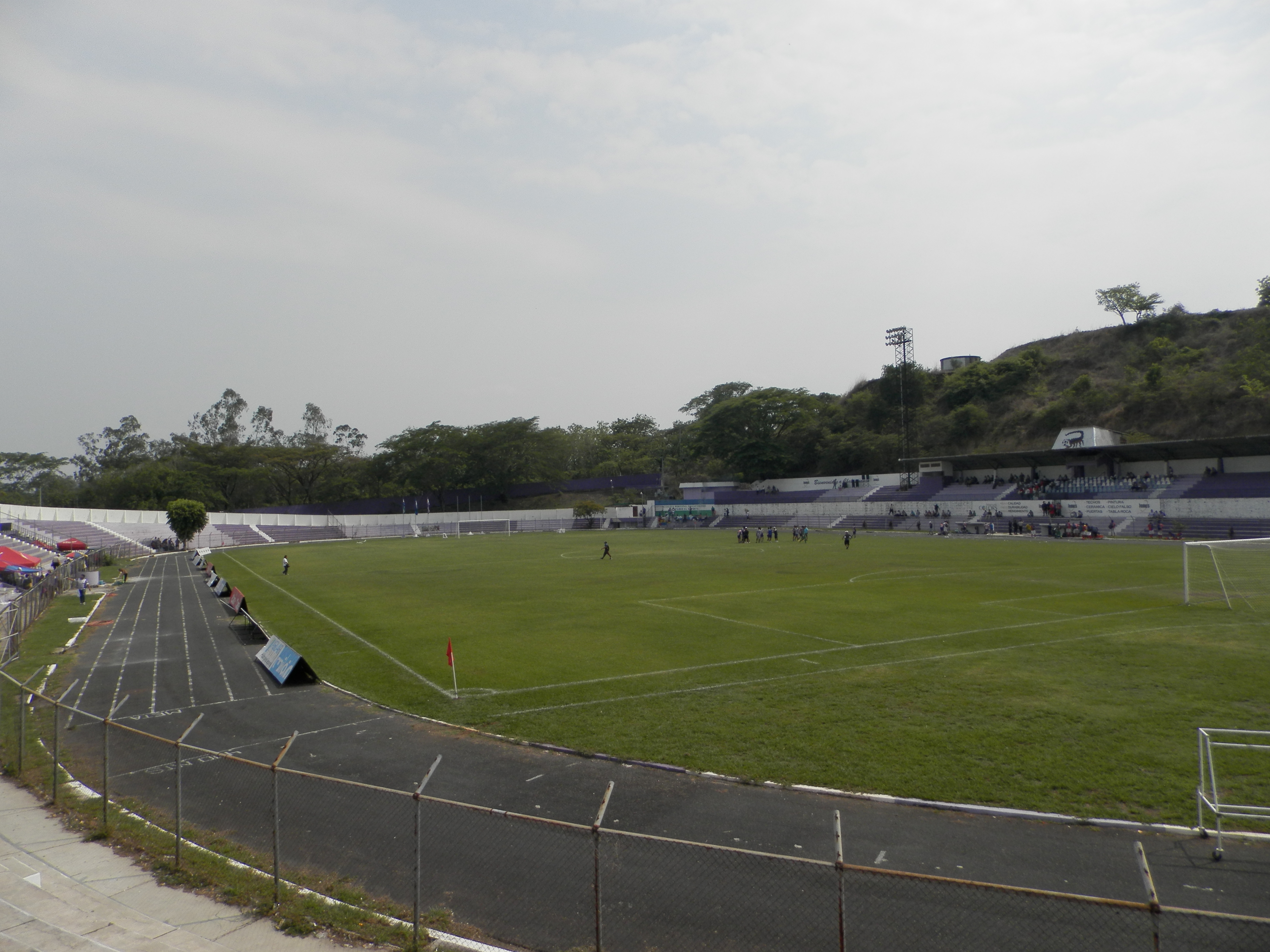
Aerial view of the José Gregorio Martínez Stadium

== History ==
The history of the stadium goes back to the 1970s, where the land which had been former farm called Totolco was acquired by the CEL and which would later be transferred to José Gregorio Martínez, the founder of Chalatenango. Martínez was a close friend of General Carlos Humberto Romero, who at that time was the president of El Salvador, and with his assistance a new stadium was built.

The idea was to create a multi sport complex, which included a football stadium, basketball courts and swimming pools, however, the last of these failed to be completed since Romero was ousted from the presidency in October 1979 and funding was lost.

The stadium was built with a capacity of 15,000 fans, with natural grass and which created a unique structure that help give the stadium its first name the 'Sombrero'.

In 1984, The club held a vote to change the name of the club, the options were between the former president Carlos Humberto Romero and the founder of the Chalatenango José Gregorio Martínez. By a large majority the club opted to rename the stadium Estadio José Gregorio Martínez."

== Distribution ==
- The stadium has four light towers
- New (not official) Olympic track
- new bathrooms
- Interior and exterior painting
- Perimeter wall
- Parking for 500 vehicles

The Stadium José Gregorio Martínez has the following distribution facilities:

Locality	Capacity according to INDES
General (SUN)	10,000
high-Tribune	2,500
low Tribune	2,500
TOTAL	15,000

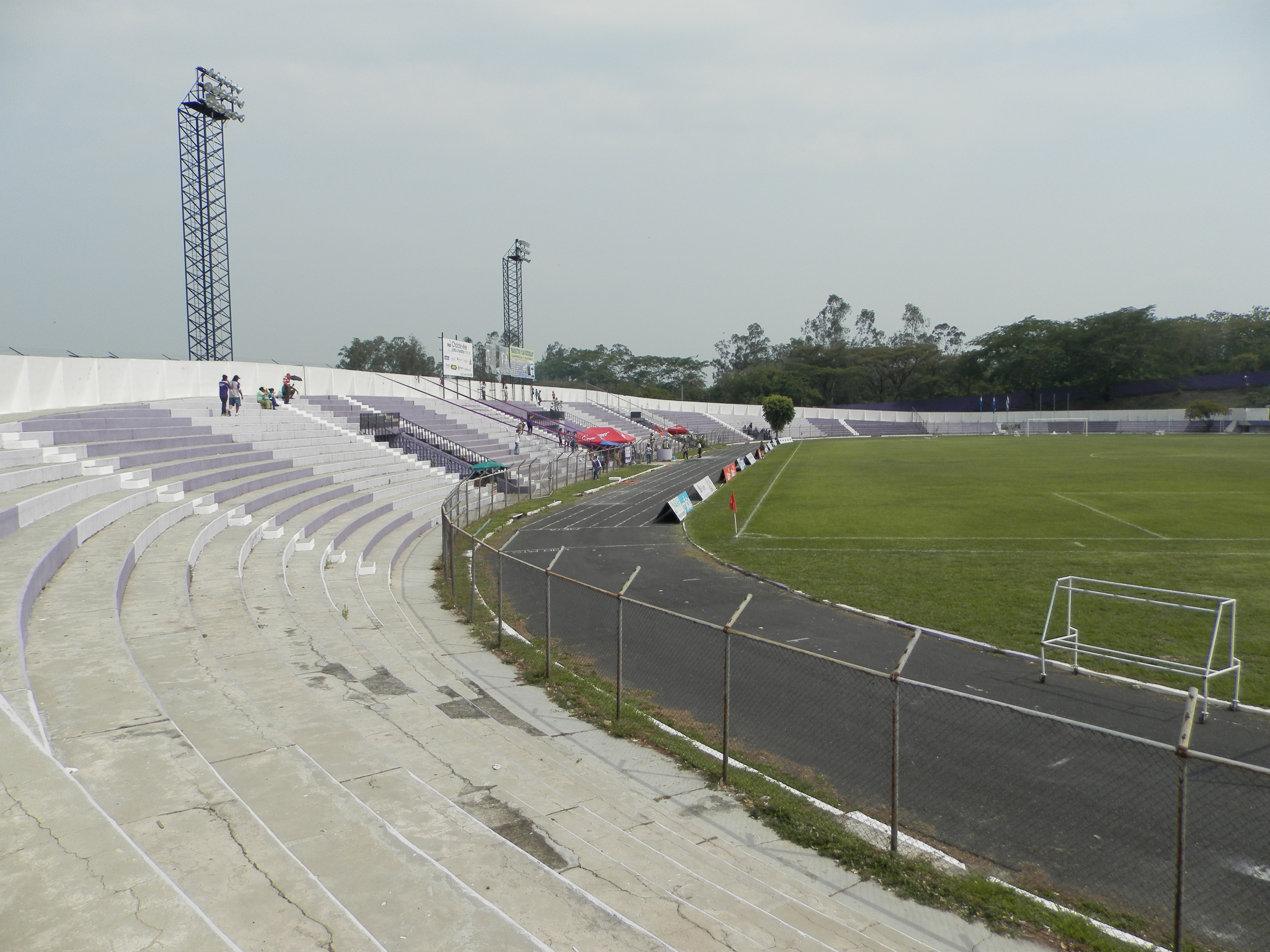
General field bleachers (SUN) Stadium

== Details ==
The stadium is the largest in the north and the department also is the largest in El Salvador most glorious moments have been from 2003 to 2010, almost a decade "The Chalate" was in first division and the stadium is filled every Sunday afternoon playing equipment. The December 16, 2009 was inaugurated the electrical lighting that allow the team to play night games, which are still being carried out despite the Club Deportivo Chalatenango is currently in second division. 1 From 2009 plays some home games the Scorpions North.

A few matches in 2009 will be the host stadium for Nejapa.
