= William Torres (footballer, born 1976) =

Salvadoran footballer (born 1976)

William Torres Alegría
Personal information
- Full name: William Jeovanny Torres Alegría
- Date of birth: October 27, 1976 (age 50)
- Place of birth: San Miguel, El Salvador
- Height: 1.69 m (5 ft 7 in)
- Positions: Winger; attacking midfielder

Senior career*
Years	Team	Apps	(Gls)
1992	C.D. Saprivas		
1993–1994	Liberal		
1994–2000	Dragón		
2000–2001	Águila		
2001–2002	FAS		(3)
2003–2005	Águila		
2006	Independiente Nacional 1906		
2006	Once Municipal		
2007–2010	Águila	80	(12)
2011	Dragón		
2012	Luis Ángel Firpo		

International career
1999–2009	El Salvador	34	(3)
- * Club domestic league appearances and goals

William Jeovanny Torres Alegría (born October 27, 1976) is a Salvadoran retired professional footballer who played as a winger or attacking midfielder.

== Club career ==
Torres Alegría was born in San Miguel, El Salvador. He started his career at third division Saprivas before stepping up a division to play for Liberal in 1993. He then had a lengthy spell with Dragón with whom he made his debut in the top tier of local football. He joined Águila in 2000 where he would stay for another five years but for a year with FAS in between. After short spells at second division Independiente Nacional 1906 and at Once Municipal he rejoined Águila in 2007.

=== Retirement and change of heart ===
In February 2011, William Torres announced his retirement from football for personal reasons, but he signed with second level Dragón for the 2011 Apertura season. In January 2012 he moved to Luis Ángel Firpo.

== International career ==
Torres Alegría made his debut for El Salvador in an August 1999 friendly match against Greece and has earned a total of 33 caps, scoring 3 goals including his first one in an unofficial game against Honduras. He has represented his country in 13 FIFA World Cup qualification matches and played at the 2003 and 2009 CONCACAF Gold Cups.

His final international game was a July 2009 CONCACAF Gold Cup match against Canada.

=== International goals ===
Scores and results list El Salvador's goal tally first.

#	Date	Venue	Opponent	Score	Result	Competition
1	10 February 2000	Estadio Francisco Morazán, San Pedro Sula, Honduras	Honduras	1-4	1-5	Friendly match (not full FIFA int.)
2	26 March 2008	RFK Memorial Stadium, Washington, United States	Anguilla	4-0	4-0	2010 FIFA World Cup qualification
3	6 September 2008	Estadio Cuscatlán, San Salvador, El Salvador	Haiti	5-0	5-0	2010 FIFA World Cup qualification
