= Gustavo de Simone =

Uruguayan footballer and manager (born 1948)

Personal information
- Full name: Gustavo Daniel de Simone Horn
- Date of birth: April 23, 1948 (age 78)
- Place of birth: Montevideo, Uruguay
- Position: Defender

Senior career*
Years	Team	Apps	(Gls)
1969–1974	Defensor Sporting		
1975	Chacarita Juniors	24	(0)

International career
1973–1974	Uruguay	8	(0)

Managerial career
- 1986: Herediano
- 1987: Cartaginés
- 1987–1989: Costa Rica
- 1989–1990: Jerez Industrial
- 1990: Huesca
- 1991: Xerez
- 1992: Panama
- 1995–1996: Cúcuta
- 2002–2003: Sagrada Familia
- 2003: Luis Ángel Firpo
- 2006–2007: Jalapa
- 2008: Atlético Balboa
- 2009–2010: Nejapa
- 2015–2016: Municipal Grecia
- * Club domestic league appearances and goals

Gustavo Daniel de Simone Horn (born April 23, 1948) is a Uruguayan football coach and former national team player.

== Club career ==
As a player, he had a short stint in Argentina with Chacarita Juniors where he played 24 league games.

== International career ==
De Simone represented his country in 3 FIFA World Cup qualification matches.
