= Leandro Franco =

Brazilian footballer (born 1981)

Personal information
- Full name: Leandro Lourenço Franco
- Date of birth: August 10, 1981 (age 45)
- Place of birth: Pouso Alegre, Brazil
- Height: 1.75 m (5 ft 9 in)
- Position: Forward

Youth career
- União Barbarense
- Inter de Limeira

Senior career*
Years	Team	Apps	(Gls)
2002–2003	Inter de Limeira	20	(9)
2003	Tombense		
2003	XV de Piracicaba		
2004	Paulista-SP	3	(0)
2005	Rio Branco-PR	25	(3)
2005	Colo-Colo	15	(3)
2006	Inter de Limeira		
2006	Rio Branco-PR		
2007–2008	Guarani-SP	33	(5)
2008	Atromitos	8	(0)
2008	Águila	24	(7)
2009	Luis Ángel Firpo	15	(8)
2010	Marília	13	(1)
2011	Caldense	2	(0)
2011	Atlético Sorocaba	3	(0)
2011	Sport Boys	11	(8)
2012	Sporting Cristal	18	(4)
2013	Sport Boys	11	(6)
2013	León de Huánuco	6	(0)
2014	Juventude	4	(0)
2014–2015	Independente Limeira	11	(2)
2015	Unión Magdalena	6	(0)
2018	Pouso Alegre	2	(0)
- * Club domestic league appearances and goals

Leandro Lourenço Franco (born August 10, 1981), commonly known as Lê, is a Brazilian former professional footballer who played as a forward.

== Career ==
Franco was born in Pouso Alegre. After playing with South American giants Colo-Colo in 2005, he got offers to play in well known Mexican teams, such as Cruz Azul. Then went on to play in Super League Greece team Atromitos. His team relegated to Beta Ethniki, so he looked for new options. He finally got an offer to play for Águila, one of the biggest clubs in El Salvador and Central America. In 2009, he signed a one-year contract with fellow Salvadorans Luis Ángel Firpo. Then, in 2010 he moved back to his native Brazil to play with Marília Atlético Clube only to join Sport Boys in Peru in 2011 and 2013. In that country, he also played for Sporting Cristal and León de Huánuco.

== Post-retirement ==
Franco has served as coach for football academies in his homeland and took part in sport events alongside the former futsal player Falcão.
