= José Luis Osorio =

Mexican footballer (born 1980)

Personal information
- Full name: José Luis Osorio Aguilar
- Date of birth: 4 November 1980 (age 45)
- Place of birth: Mexico City, Mexico
- Height: 1.75 m (5 ft 9 in)
- Position: Forward

Youth career
- 1994: Pumas

Senior career*
Years	Team	Apps	(Gls)
1994–2002	Pumas	3	(0)
2003	Albinegros de Orizaba		
2004	Guerreros de Tabasco		
2004–2005	Pumas		
2006	Alianza		
2007–2008	Nejapa		
2008–2009	Chalatenango		
2009–2010	Atlético Marte	33	(7)

International career
1997	Mexico U17		
- * Club domestic league appearances and goals

José Luis Osorio (born 4 November 1980) is a Mexican former professional footballer who played as a forward.

== Club career ==
Osorio previously played for UNAM Pumas in the Primera División de México, making three substitute appearances during the Invierno 1999 and Verano 2000 tournaments.

== International career ==
Osorio played for Mexico at the 1997 FIFA U-17 World Championship in Egypt.
