= Alacranes del Norte =

Association football club in El Salvador

- Full name: Alacranes del Norte Fútbol Clube
- Founded: July 2002 (as Nejapa F.C.)
- Dissolved: January 2011
- Ground: Estadio José Gregorio Martínez, Chalatenango, El Salvador
- Capacity: 15,000
Home colours	Away colours

Alacranes del Norte (formerly known as Nejapa Fútbol Club) was a football club based in Chalatenango, El Salvador.

The club last played in the Segunda División. In January 2011, it was announced that the Alacranes del Norte license had been removed by the Segunda División, following financial difficulties for the owner, Mynor Vargas and the failure of attempts to find a new ownership group.

== History ==
=== Nejapa Fútbol Club ===
Original Nejapa FC crest from 2002 to 2009

Nejapa Fútbol Club was formed in July 2002, a collaboration between the municipal council of Nejapa (without community collaboration) and the University of El Salvador (UES). When the UES football team obtained a licence and were promoted to play in the Second Division, its representatives approached René Canjura, mayor of Nejapa, and offered its space in the Third Division to the town. That same month, the process of inscription was finalized and Nejapa Fútbol Club were registered in the Third Division.

In 2004, Nejapa won promotion to the Second Division thanks to the help of both Colombian player Andrés Medina Aguirre and Manager Douglas Vidal Jiménez (former coach of ADET). In 2005/06 season Nejapa progressed all the way to the final but were then defeated by Nacional 1906.

In 2006, Carlos "El Cacho" Meléndez took the reins at Nejapa and started to sign both upcoming players and experienced ones, such as Mexican forward José Luis Osorio. In the play-off semi final they defeated Municipal Limeño to reach the final, which they played against Juventud Independiente. They won with a winning goal by Osorio and earned promotion to the Primera División de Fútbol de El Salvador for the first time.

=== Relocation and rename to Alacranes del Norte ===
In 2010, some of C.D. Chalatenango's former players created a new team and merged it with Nejapa to establish a new club. They decided to move it to the city of Chalatenango and renamed the club to Alacranes del Norte (Scorpions of the North) due to their new city's geographical location. In January 2011 the club folded due to financial reasons.

== Stadium ==
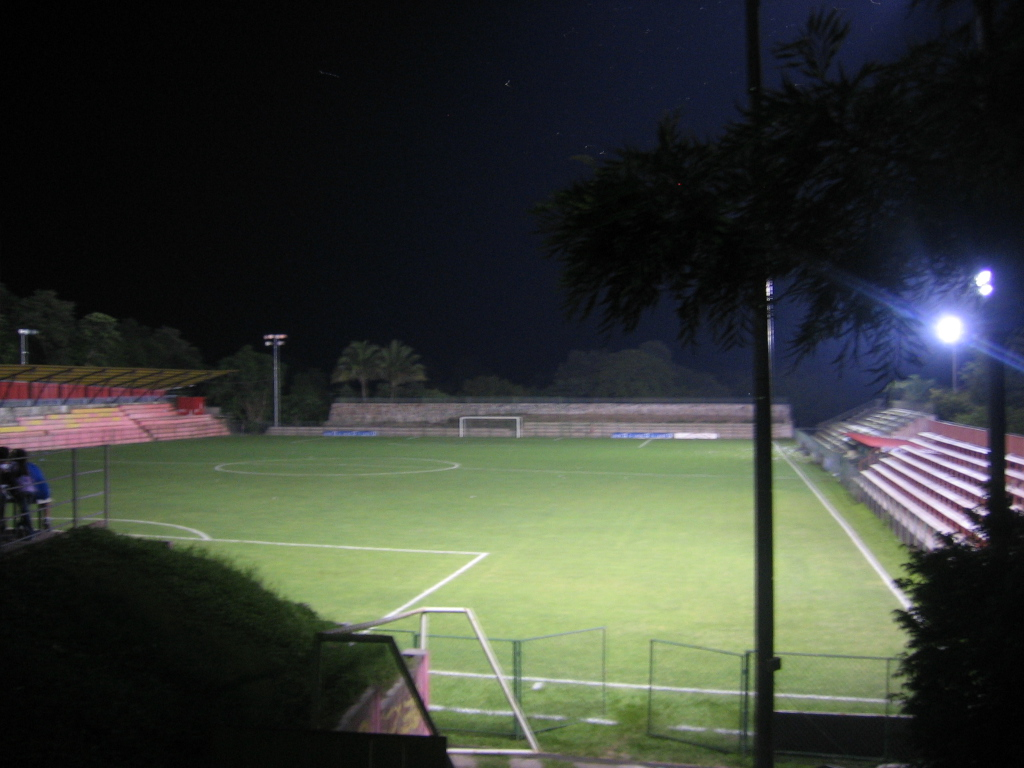
Nejapa Stadium

Under the Nejapa F.C. name, they played most of their home games at the Polideportivo Victoria Gasteiz in Nejapa, with occasions where the team would play in the Estadio Cuscatlán. Since late 2009, the Estadio José Gregorio Martínez in Chalatenango had served as their home stadium.

== Sponsorship ==
Sponsors

- Front Milan (Kit manufacturer)
- Caja de Crédito de Quezaltepeque
- Tigo
- MK medicamentos
- CANAL 12 de Televisión
- Mides
2010
2008–2009
2002–2008

Kit Information

Nejapa F.C. wore the red and white striped jersey since their establishment until 2008. Then they upgraded their uniform to incorporate a yellow jersey, red shorts and yellow socks. In 2010, after the club relocated from Nejapa to Chalatenango, the club decided to change the team colours from the current yellow and red to purple.

== Honours ==
- Segunda División Salvadoran and predecessors
  - Champions (1) : Apertura 2006, Clausura 2007
- Tercera División Salvadorean and predecessors
  - Champions (1) :
- ADFAS and predecessors
  - Champions - San Salvador Department (1) :

== League season performance ==
(Apertura 2007 – Clausura 2010)

Season	League	Position	GP	W	D	L	GF	GA	PTS	Playoffs	Pl.	W	D	L	GS	GA	PTS
Apertura 2007	Segunda División	8th	18	5	7	6	31	34	22	Did not qualify	-	-	-	-	-	-	-
Clausura 2008	Primera División de Fútbol de El Salvador	8th	18	4	7	7	20	26	19	Did not qualify	-	-	-	-	-	-	-
Apertura 2008	Primera División	10th	18	2	5	10	16	32	11	Did not qualify	-	-	-	-	-	-	-
Clausura 2009	Primera División	4th	18	7	8	3	21	17	29	Semi-finals	2	0	0	2	0	6	0
Apertura 2009	Primera División	9th	18	3	5	10	16	39	14	Did not qualify	-	-	-	-	-	-	-
Clausura 2010	Primera División	10th (Relegated)	18	0	5	13	12	37	5	Did not qualify	-	-	-	-	-	-	-

== Top scorers in the first division ==
- Apertura 2007 (Mexico) José Luis Osorio (6 goals)
- Clausura 2008 (Uruguay) Juan Carlos Reyes (9 goals)
- Apertura 2008 (Argentina) (El Salvador) Emiliano Pedrozo (5 goals)
- Clausura 2009 (Colombia) Andrés Medina Aguirre (4 goals)
- Apertura 2009 (El Salvador) José Manuel Martínez (6 goals)
- Clausura 2010 (El Salvador) José Manuel Martínez (El Salvador) Guillermo José Morán (El Salvador) José Amílcar Ramírez (El Salvador) Juan Carlos Panameño (El Salvador) Cristian Ernesto López (2 goals)

== Managerial history ==
Name	From	To
(El Salvador) Douglas Vidal Jiménez	2004	2006
(El Salvador) Carlos Antonio Meléndez	2006	2007
(El Salvador) Mauricio Cienfuegos	Jan 2008	Aug 2008
(El Salvador) (Argentina) Emiliano Pedrozo (caretaker)	Aug 2008	Sep 2008
(Uruguay) Daniel Uberti	Sep 2008	Dec 2009
(El Salvador) Nelson Mauricio Ancheta	Jan 2009	May 2009
(Uruguay) Gustavo de Simone	Aug 2009	Jan 2010
(El Salvador) Carlos Antonio Meléndez	Jan 2010	Aug 2010
(Uruguay) Garabet Avedissian	Aug 2010	Jan 2011
(El Salvador) Marcos Portillo	Jan 2011	Jan 2011

== Presidential history ==
- (El Salvador) René Canjura (2004–09)
- (El Salvador) Gerardo Tomasino (2009)
- (Costa Rica) Mynor Vargas (2010)
