= Arturo Albarrán =

Mexican footballer (born 1979)

Personal information
- Full name: Sergio Arturo Albarrán Arellano
- Date of birth: October 16, 1979 (age 47)
- Place of birth: Mexico City, Mexico
- Position: Midfielder

Youth career
- 1999–2001: UNAM Pumas

Senior career*
Years	Team	Apps	(Gls)
2002–2003	Chivas de Tijuana		
2002–2003	Orizabal		
2003–2004	Lagartos de Tabasco		
2004–2005	Atlético Mexiquense		
2005–2008	Alianza		
2008–2010	Águila		
2010–2011	Atlético Marte		
2011	Hollywood United Hitmen		
2011–2012	UES	21	(2)
2012	Alianza		
2013	Zacatepec	11	(0)
- * Club domestic league appearances and goals

Sergio Arturo Albarrán Arellano (born October 16, 1979), known as Arturo Albarrán, is a Mexico-born Salvadoran retired professional association footballer who played as a midfielder.
