= Alcides Bandera =

Uruguayan footballer (born 1978)

Personal information
- Full name: Alcides Eduardo Bandera Rodríguez
- Date of birth: 5 February 1978 (age 48)
- Place of birth: Paysandú, Uruguay
- Height: 1.85 m (6 ft 1 in)
- Position: Forward

Senior career*
Years	Team	Apps	(Gls)
1999–2002	Bella Vista (Paysandú)		(14)
2003	Centauros		
2003	Real Cartagena		
2003–2005	Isidro Metapán		
2006	Paysandú		(6)
2007–2010	Atlético Balboa	65	(18)
2010–2011	Atlético Marte	51	(23)
- * Club domestic league appearances and goals as of 4 March 2012

Alcides Eduardo Bandera Rodríguez (born 5 February 1978) is a Uruguayan footballer.
