= Gerry (footballer) =

Brazilian footballer (born 1978)

Personal information
- Full name: José Oliveira de Souza
- Date of birth: 19 March 1978 (age 48)
- Place of birth: Pedra Branca, Ceará, Brazil
- Height: 1.79 m (5 ft 10 in)
- Position: Striker

Senior career*
Years	Team	Apps	(Gls)
1998–2002	Rio Branco-AC		
2002–2004	Osasco		
2004–2005	Portimonense		
2006	Roma Esporte		
2006–2008	Serra		
2008	Águila		(11)
2009	Municipal Limeño	18	(9)
2009–2010	Alianza	29	(13)
2011–2012	Đồng Tâm Long An	0	(0)
2013–2014	Colatina Sociedade Esportiva	0	(0)
2014	Espírito Santo Sociedade Esportiva	0	(0)
- * Club domestic league appearances and goals as of November 4, 2010

José Oliveira de Souza (born 19 March 1978), known in Brazil as Gerry, is a Brazilian former football striker who last played for Espírito Santo Sociedade Esportiva.

Until November 2010, Oliveira played for Alianza. However, he ended his stint at the club and returned to his native Brazil to be with his pregnant wife. He did not rule out the possibility of returning to Alianza in the future.
