= AD Chalatenango =

Association football club in El Salvador

Chalatenango
- Full name: Asociación Deportiva Chalatenango
- Nicknames: Los Duros del Norte (The Hard Ones of the North); Los Alacranes (The Scorpions)
- Founded: 1950; 76 years ago; as Club Deportivo Chalatenango; 2009; 17 years ago; as Alacranes Del Norte; 2012; 14 years ago; as Clube Deportivo Chalatenango-Vendaval; 2013; 13 years ago; as Club Deportivos Chalatenango; 10 July 2017; 9 years ago; as Asociación Deportiva Chalatenango
- Dissolved: 26 March 2024; 2 years ago
- Ground: Estadio José Gregorio Martínez
- Capacity: 15,000
- Coordinates: 14°02′34″N 88°58′05″W
- Chairman: Bertilio Henríquez Ayala
- Manager: Ricardo Serrano
- League: First Division of Salvadoran Football
- 2022 Clausura: Overall: 10th Playoffs: Did not qualify
Home colors	Away colors

Asociación Deportiva Chalatenango was a Salvadoran professional football club based in Chalatenango, El Salvador. The club formerly played in the top-tier Primera División de Fútbol de El Salvador.

The club was founded in 1950 as C.D. Alacranes, and reformed in 1975, as C.D. Chalatenango.

In 1975, the club relocated to their current stadium, the Estadio José Gregorio Martínez stadium.

They initially competed in the regional and national competition before eventually joining the full Salvadoran Second Division in 1960s, and subsequently enjoyed promotion to the top flight for the 1979 season.

Since its formation in 1950, the club has won three Segunda División Salvadoreño titles (1979, 1990, 2003) and one Tercera División Salvadoreño (2013 Clausura).

Its emblem and mascot is a scorpion.

== History ==
=== Early history ===
In 1977 Gregorio Martínez, started a club naming them Alacranes and purchased the spot of Independiente de San Vicente in the Liga de Ascenso for five Colon. They eventually changed their name to Club Deportivo Chalatenango.

=== Club Deportivo Chalatenango success and insolvency (1979–2009) ===
In 1979, the club was promoted to the First Division for the first time in its history. The club finished the 1979–80 season in 7th place, accumulating 18 points from 8 wins, 2 draws, and 12 losses. Chalatenango finished in last place during the 1983 season but was not relegated. It remained in the first division until being relegated to the Second Division following its last place finish during the 1989–90 season. During the club's first 11 seasons it was in the First Division, it never qualified for the postseason tournament.

They stayed in the Segunda División battling promotion for 13 years until they won promotion in 2003, but a year later they were relegated again.

However they were able to quickly return to the Primera División de Fútbol Professional by purchasing the spot of Coca-Cola for $250,000.

In the 2008 Apertura, Chalatenango reached the final for the first time in the club's history under the direction of Carlos Antonio Meléndez. After a 3–3 draw in normal time, they lost 4–3 on penalties, which allowed Isidro Metapán to become champions for the second time.

The team qualified for the 2009–10 CONCACAF Champions league knockout phase based on their record in apertura and clausura. On 26 June 2009, due to financial trouble, sold their spot in the Primera División de Fútbol Profesional to Municipal Limeño. Because the club failed to fill out the necessary paperwork to compete in the Second Division before the 23 July 2009 deadline, CD Chalatenango did not compete during the 2009–10 season.

At the time, the club owed its former players $17,000 in unpaid salaries, and it owed CONCACAF $7,500 for pulling out of the CONCACAF Champions League.

=== Merger years (2009–2013) ===
At the end of 2009, some of Chalatenango's former players created a new team, merging it with Nejapa FC to establish Alacranes Del Norte.

In 2010, the club filed the necessary paperwork to be able to compete in the Second Division.

In 2012, The club merged with Vendaval to form Chalatenango-Vendaval and they played in the second division. However, after one season, in 2013, the partnership between Chalatenango and Vendaval ended and they split into two teams again, with Vendaval remaining in the Second Division while Chalatenango descending down a level to play in the third division.

=== Rebirth and another bankruptcy (2013–2017) ===
Chalatenango as a sole entity for the first time in five years, they were able to win promotion to the segunda division via promotion playoff and they continued several attempts to gain promotion to the first division, they were unsuccessful

However, on 18 June 2015 the team purchased a franchise license in the new expansion of the Primera Division and will be able to compete in the Primera Division for the Apertura 2015 season.

Financial troubles precipitated a succession of ownership changes and the club's eventual bankruptcy in June 2017 with total liabilities of €218 thousand dollars and months of unpaid salaries. The club was allowed to finish the season but finished bottom of the league in 12th place. They had License stripped and owner Francisco Perraza were suspended.

=== Another rebirth (2017–present) ===
The re-founded club, A.D. Chalatenango, was formed in July 2017, taking its name from the predecessor club and beating off competition from rival clubs to secure a place in the 2017–2018 season as the representative of Chalatenango. Rigoberto Mejia was appointed as president and former coach Ricardo Serrano was chosen as head coach.

The club was relegated to the second division in May 2023.

On 28 July 2023, the Segunda División confirmed the administrative relegatation of Chalatenango to Tercera Division due to their financial crisis, which meant all players contracts were voided.

On 26 March 2024, FESFUT announced that Chalatenango will disaffiliate and we no longer be able to register or participate with ADFA and any professional league, every member of the board will be banned for 10 years and FESFUT will take responsibility of payments of the remaining debts.

== Stadium ==
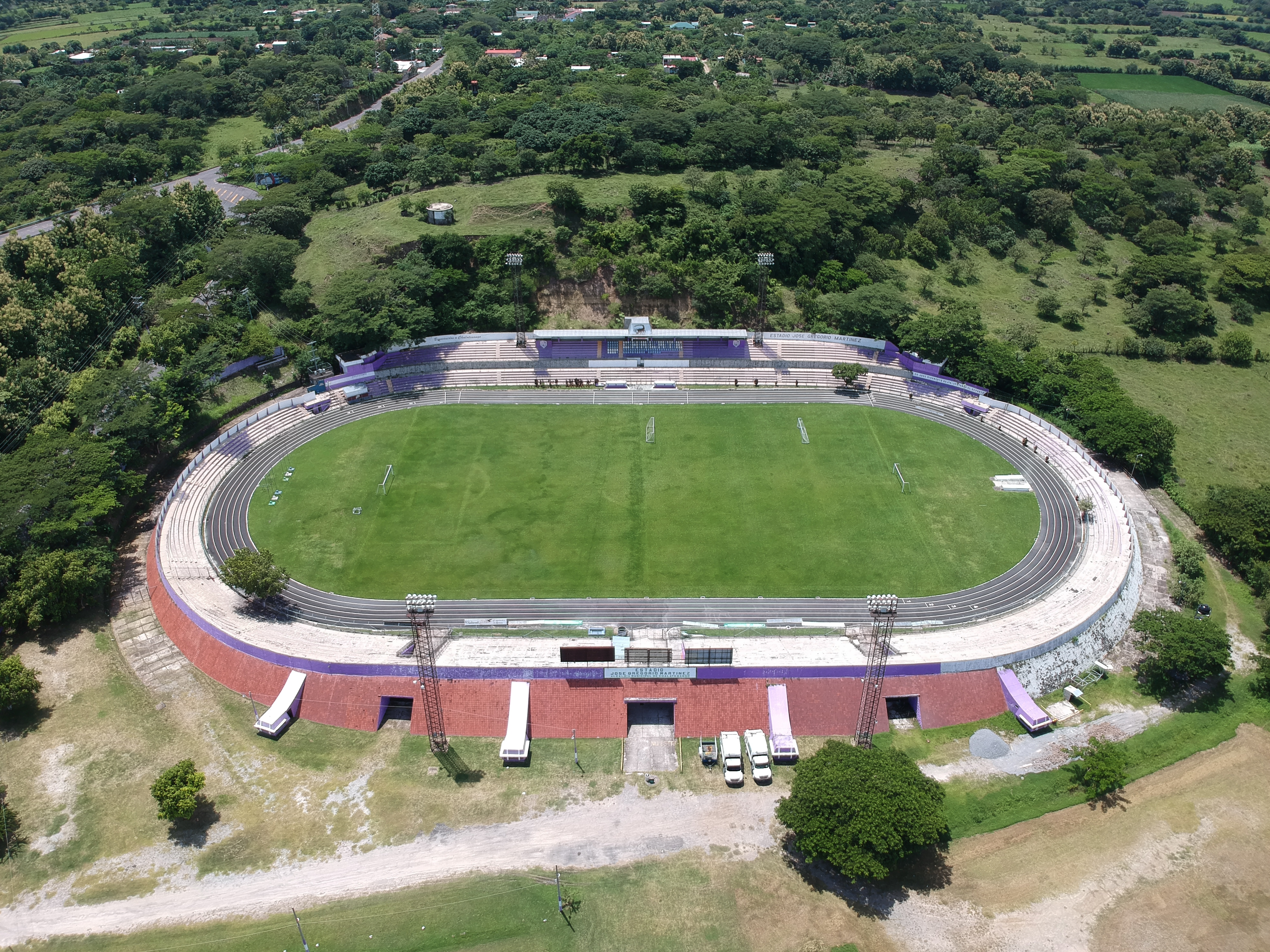
Estadio José Gregorio Martínez panoramic view of the stadium

Name	Location	Years in use
Estadio José Gregorio Martínez	Chalatenango	1975 – present
TBD	TBD	2003; 1 game in U.S. Open Cup
TBD	TBD	2007–present

Chalatenango plays its home games at Estadio José Gregorio Martínez in Chalatenango. The Estadio José Gregorio Martínez is a 15,000-seat soccer-specific stadium.

In 2018, INDES stated that Estadio José Gregorio Martínez will undergo renovations to allow them to satisfy the ability to host CONCACAF matches.

== Rivalry ==
Chalatenango's current biggest rivalry was with fellow Chalatenango based team Atlético Comalapa, against whom they contest the derby chalateco.

Another of Chalatenango's rivalry was with fellow Chalatenango based but now defunct team Alacranes Del Norte, against whom they contest the derby chalateco. The rivalry stems from Alacranes Del Norte 's relocation from Nejapa to Chalatenango and using the same colours and stadium as Chalatenango

== Sponsorship ==
Companies that Chalatenango currently has sponsorship deals with for 2021 Apertura include:

- Arijam Sports – Official kit suppliers
- Electrolit – Official sponsors
- Powerade – Official sponsors
- Canal 4 – Official sponsors
- Aqua Sport – Official sponsors
- Eurofarma – Official sponsors
- Omnicom – Official sponsors
- Fitness Sports – Official sponsors

== Honours ==
=== Domestic honours ===
==== Leagues ====
- First Division of Salvadoran Football and predecessors
  - Runners-up (1): Apertura 2008
- Second Division of Salvadoran Football and predecessors
  - Champions (3): 1979, 1990, 2003
- Third Division of Salvadoran Football and predecessors
  - Champions (1): 2013 Clausura

== Club records ==
- First game in the Primera Division for Chalatenango: 0–1 v Atletico Marte, 6 May 1979
- First victory in the Primera Division for Chalatenango: 2–1 TBD, TBD, 2019
- First goalscorer for Chalatenango: TBD v TBD, TBD, 2019
- First goalscorer in the Primera Division for Chalatenango: TBD v TBD, TBD, 2019
- Largest Home victory, Primera División: 3–0 v TBD, TBD, 2019
- Largest Away victory, Primera División: 4–0 TBD, TBD, 2019
- Largest Home loss, Primera División: 4–0 v TBD, TBD, 2019
- Largest Away loss, Primera División: 0–3 v TBD, TBD, 2019
- Highest home attendance: 14,403 v Primera División, Estadio Cuscatlán, 21 December 2008
- Highest away attendance: 1,000 v Primera División, San Salvador, 2018
- Highest average attendance, season: 49,176, Primera División
- Most goals scored, Apertura 2019 season, Primera División: 21, TBD, 2018
- Worst season: Primera Division Apertura 2019: 3 win, 5 draws and 14 losses (14 points)

=== Individual records ===
- Record appearances (all competitions): TBD, 822 from 1957 to 1975
- Record appearances (Primera Division): Salvadoran TBD, 27 from 2018
- Most capped player for El Salvador: 74 (7 whilst at Chalatenango), Ramón Sánchez
- Most international caps for El Salvador while a Chalatnenago player: 1, TBD
- Most caps won whilst at Chalatenango: 1, TBD.
- Record scorer in league: TBD, 396
- Most goals in a season (all competitions): TBD, 62 (1927/28) (47 in League, 15 in Cup competitions)
- Most goals in a season (Primera Division): René Andrés Ubau, 13

=== Top scorers ===
Position	Player	Season	Goals Scored
1	(Colombia) Bladimir Díaz	2017	11

=== Most appearances ===
No.	Player	Period	Appearances
1	(El Salvador) Miguel Ángel Díaz	1977–1989	tbd
2	(El Salvador) Hector Cruz	2015–2018, 2019–2022	193
3	(El Salvador) Ramón Martínez de Paz	2000–2008, 2016	183
4	(El Salvador) Miguel Lemus	2015–2016, 2018–2022	161
5	(El Salvador) Henry Reyes	2015, 2017–2021	146
6	(El Salvador) Jose Ortega	2015–2023	137
7	(El Salvador) Brayan Josue Landaverde	2015–2023	130
8	(Colombia) Bladimir Díaz	2015–2017, 2021	111
9	(El Salvador) Israel Landaverde	2016–2019	90
10	(El Salvador) Henry Hernandez	2018, 2020–2022	80
11	(El Salvador) Hugo Casco	2003-2005	79

Note: Players in bold text are still active with Chalatenango

=== Top goalscorers ===
No.	Player	period	Goals
1	(El Salvador) TBD	2019	tbd
2	(El Salvador) Miguel Ángel Díaz	1977–1989	tbd
3	(Colombia) Bladimir Díaz	2015–2017, 2021	59
4	(El Salvador) TBD	2019	TBD
5	(El Salvador) TBD	2019	tbd
6	(El Salvador) TBD	2019	tbd
7	(El Salvador) TBD	2019	tbd
8	(El Salvador) Hugo Burgos	2019	tbd
9	(El Salvador) Andres Rene Ubau	1979–1989	tbd
10	(Honduras) Franklin Vinisos Webster	2005–2007	23
11	(Jamaica) Kemal Malcolm	2020–2022	21
12	(Jamaica) Craig Foster	2019, 2021	16

Note: Players in bold text are still active with Chalatenango

== Current squad ==
As of 20 January 2024: Note: Flags indicate national team as defined under FIFA eligibility rules; some limited exceptions apply. Players may hold more than one non-FIFA nationality.

No.	Pos.	Nation	Player
—		ESA	TBD
—		ESA	TBD (vice-captain)
—		ESA	TBD (captain)
—		ESA	TBD

No.	Pos.	Nation	Player
—		ESA	TBD
—		ESA	TBD
—		ESA	TBD

=== Out on loan ===
Note: Flags indicate national team as defined under FIFA eligibility rules; some limited exceptions apply. Players may hold more than one non-FIFA nationality.

No.	Pos.	Nation	Player
—	FW	ESA	TBD (at TBD for the 2023–24 season)
—	MF	ESA	TBD (at TBD for the 2023–24 season)

No.	Pos.	Nation	Player
—	MF	ESA	TBD (at TBD for the 2023–24 season)
—	DF	ESA	TBD (at TBD for the 2023–24 season)

=== In ===
Note: Flags indicate national team as defined under FIFA eligibility rules; some limited exceptions apply. Players may hold more than one non-FIFA nationality.

No.	Pos.	Nation	Player
—		ESA	TBD (From TBD)
—		ESA	TBD (From TBD)
—		ESA	TBD (From TBD)

No.	Pos.	Nation	Player
—		ESA	TBD (From TBD)
—		ESA	TBD (From TBD)
—		ESA	TBD (From TBD)

=== Out ===
Note: Flags indicate national team as defined under FIFA eligibility rules; some limited exceptions apply. Players may hold more than one non-FIFA nationality.

No.	Pos.	Nation	Player
—		ESA	Dany Cetre (To Isidro Metapan)
—		ESA	Steven Guerra (To Dragon)
—		ESA	TBD (To TBD)
—		ESA	TBD (To TBD)
—		ESA	TBD (To TBD)
—		ESA	TBD (To TBD)
—		ESA	TBD (To TBD)

No.	Pos.	Nation	Player
—		ESA	TBD (To TBD)
—		ESA	TBD (To TBD)
—		ESA	TBD (To TBD)
—		ESA	TBD (To TBD)

=== Players with dual citizenship ===
- (El Salvador) (United States) Josué Dubon
- (El Salvador) (Canada) Fernando Estrada
- (El Salvador) (Canada) (Philippines) Matthaus García

=== Captains ===
Years	Player
1978-1979	(El Salvador) Miguel Arevalo
1979	(Chile) Hugo Ottensen
1985-1986	(El Salvador) Miguel Arevalo
1987	(El Salvador) Martin Velasco
1988-1990	(El Salvador) Miguel Arevalo
2015-2016	(Colombia) Miguel Solis
2016-2017	(El Salvador) Carlos Carrillo
2020	(El Salvador) Henry Reyes
2023	(El Salvador) Brayan Landaverde
2023	(El Salvador) Leonardo Menjivar

== Personnel ==
=== Management ===
Position	Staff
Owner	(El Salvador) Asociación Deportiva Henríquez
President	(El Salvador) Bertilio Henriquez Ayala
Vice President	(El Salvador) Rafael Alexander Zelaya
Management Representative	(El Salvador) Óscar Guardado
Assistant Representative	(El Salvador) TBD
Administrative Manager	(El Salvador) Edwin Sa
Administrative Assistant Manager	(El Salvador) TBD
Sports Manager	(El Salvador) TBD

== Reserve League squad ==
Chalatenango's reserve squad plays in the twelve-team Primera División Reserves (El Salvador). Updated 9 May 2023 Note: Flags indicate national team as defined under FIFA eligibility rules; some limited exceptions apply. Players may hold more than one non-FIFA nationality.

No.	Pos.	Nation	Player
37		ESA	Walter Menjivar
52		ESA	Bruno Flores
32		ESA	F. Palencia
34		ESA	F. Ochoa
35		ESA	D. Fuentes
36		ESA	D. Flores
38		ESA	Javier Peraza
39		ESA	Vladimir Adame
41		ESA	Hamilton Lemus
42		ESA	Anthony Ochoa
43		ESA	E Ardon
45		ESA	Angel Guandique

No.	Pos.	Nation	Player
46	GK	ESA	A Casco
47		ESA	A Orellana
49		ESA	Jesus Orellana
50		ESA	Erick Menjivar
53		ESA	I. Arevalo
54		ESA	M. Soriano
55		ESA	Carlos Martinez
59		ESA	John Lemus
60		ESA	Alejandro Dubon

== Presidential history ==
Name	Year
(El Salvador) Humberto Romero	1984–??
(El Salvador) Jesús Navas	??–03
(El Salvador) José Elías Romero	2003–04
(El Salvador) José Salvador Cardoza	2005–06
(El Salvador) Lisandro Pohl	2006–08
(El Salvador) José Salvador Cardoza	2008–09
(El Salvador) Rigoberto Mejía	2009–15
(El Salvador) Reynaldo Cardoza	2015–16
(El Salvador) Francisco Peraza	2016
(El Salvador) Fernando Alas	2017
(El Salvador) Rigoberto Mejía	2017–2020
(El Salvador) Bertilio Henríquez Ayala	2020–May 2023
(El Salvador) Hiatus	2023-Present

== Coaches ==
Chalatenango has had 22 permanent managers and two caretaker managers since the club's first appointed Oscar Rene Serrano as a professional manager in 1960. The longest-serving manager in terms of time was Armando Contreras Palma, who managed Chalatenango for three years from 1986 to 1990. Raúl Héctor Cocherari, who managed the club from 2002 to 2003, was the first Chalatenango manager to achieve a championship.

Name	Period	Trophies
(Argentina) Raúl Héctor Cocherari	2002–2003	Segunda División (Champion)
(El Salvador) Carlos Antonio Meléndez	2008	Primera Division 2008 Apertura (Runner up)
(Honduras) German Pérez	2013	Tercera División (Champion)
