= Primera División de Fútbol Profesional Clausura 2001 =

Primera División de Fútbol de El Salvador
- Champions: Águila (13th title)
- Relegated: C.D. San Luis
- Top goalscorer: TBD (12)

The Primera División de Fútbol Profesional Clausura 2001 season (officially "Torneo Clausura 2001") started on February 3, 2001, and finished on June 30, 2001.

The season saw C.D. Águila win its 13th league title after a 2–1 victory over C.D. FAS in the final.

It was also the last time El Salvador used promotion and relegation on a per-season basis. This saw C.D. San Luis become the last team to be relegated to the Segunda División de Fútbol Salvadoreño after competing in the first division for under six months. As of the following tournament (Apertura 2001), promotion and relegation were changed to once a year, and decided on aggregate points over both Apertura and Clausura seasons.

== Team information ==
=== Further changes ===
Santa Clara sold their spot to San Luis for 75, 000 dollars.

=== Personnel and sponsoring ===
Team	Chairman	Head coach	Kitmaker	Shirt sponsor
ADET	(El Salvador) Héctor Palomo Sol	(Argentina) Juan Quarterone	TBD	TBD
Águila	(El Salvador) Alejandro Gonzalez	(Uruguay) Saul Lorenzo Rivero	TBD	TBD
Alianza	(El Salvador) Óscar Rodríguez	(Uruguay) Carlos Reyes	TBD	TBD
Atlético Marte	(El Salvador) Rafael Pacheco	(El Salvador) Juan Ramón Paredes	TBD	TBD
C.D. Dragon	(El Salvador) TBD	(El Salvador) Miguel Aguilar	TBD	TBD
FAS	(El Salvador) Reynaldo Valle	(Uruguay) (Armenia) Garabet Avedissian	TBD	TBD
Atletico Balboa	(El Salvador) Juan Pablo Robles	(El Salvador) Oscar Benítez	TBD	TBD
Firpo	(El Salvador) TBD	(Chile) Julio Escobar	TBD	TBD
Municipal Limeno	(El Salvador) TBD	(Peru) Agustín Castillo	TBD	TBD
San Luis	(El Salvador) Adrián Beltrán	(El Salvador) Saúl Molina	TBD	TBD

== Managerial changes ==
=== Before the start of the season ===
Team	Outgoing manager	Manner of departure	Date of vacancy	Replaced by	Date of appointment	Position in table
Aguila	(Argentina) Hugo Coria	Resigned, Family reason	January 3, 2001	(Uruguay) Saul Lorenzo Rivero	January 4, 2001	1st (Apertura 2000)
Atletico Marte	(El Salvador) Mauricio "Pachín" González	Moved to assistant coach	January 2001	(El Salvador) Juan Ramón Paredes	January 2001	9th (Apertura 2000)
Dragon	(Paraguay) Nelson Brizuela	TBD	2001	(El Salvador) Miguel Aguilar	2001	th (Apertura 2000)
TBD	(El Salvador) TBD	TBD	2001	(El Salvador) TBD	2001	th (Apertura 2000)

=== During the season ===
Team	Outgoing manager	Manner of departure	Date of vacancy	Replaced by	Date of appointment	Position in table
FAS	(Uruguay) (Armenia) Garabet Avedissian	Resigned	April 2001	(El Salvador) Rubén Guevara	April 2001	
Firpo	(Chile) Julio Escobar	TBD	May 2001	(Federal Republic of Yugoslavia) Miloš Miljanić	May 2001	
Municipal Limeno	(Peru) Agustin Castillo	Sacked	April 2001	(Chile) Hernan Carrasco	April 2001	

== Promotion and relegation ==
Promoted from Segunda División de Fútbol Salvadoreño as of February 3, 2001.

- C.D. San Luis

Relegated to Segunda División de Fútbol Salvadoreño as of June 30, 2001.

- C.D. San Luis

== League standings ==
Pos	Team	Pld	W	D	L	GF	GA	GD	Pts	Qualification or relegation
1	C.D. FAS	18	9	5	4	31	14	+17	32	Qualified to finals
2	C.D. Águila	18	9	5	4	28	23	+5	32	Qualified to finals
3	C.D. Municipal Limeño	18	9	3	6	31	22	+9	30	Qualified to finals
4	C.D. Luis Ángel Firpo	18	6	7	5	21	15	+6	25	Qualified to finals
5	C.D. Atlético Balboa	18	6	6	6	28	27	+1	24	
6	Atlético Marte	18	6	5	7	29	33	−4	23	
7	Alianza F.C.	18	6	5	7	26	32	−6	23	
8	C.D. Dragón	18	4	7	7	17	28	−11	19	
9	ADET	18	4	6	8	23	27	−4	18	
10	C.D. San Luis	18	4	5	9	13	26	−13	17	Relegated to Segunda Division

== Semifinals 1st leg ==
June 16, 2001

Aguila	1-1	LA Firpo
TBD		TBD

Estadio Juan Francisco Barraza

June 10, 2001

Municipal Limeño	2-3	FAS
TBD; TBD		TBD; TBD; TBD

Estadio Jose Ramon Flores

== Semifinals 2nd leg ==
June 21, 2001

LA Firpo	1-2	Aguila
TBD		TBD; TBD

Estadio Sergio Torres

June 16, 2001

FAS	2-1	Municipal Limeño
TBD; TBD		TBD

Estadio Oscar Quiteño

== Final ==
June 24, 2001

C.D. Águila	1-1	C.D. FAS

Estadio Nacional de la Flor Blanca

== Final Rematch ==
June 30, 2001

C.D. Águila	2-1	C.D. FAS
Mauro Nunes 45'; Roberto Martínez 70'		Alejandro de la Cruz Bentos 52'

Estadio Nacional de la Flor Blanca

Aguila
GK	(El Salvador) Juan José Gómez
DF	(El Salvador) Kilmar Jiménez	Substituted off
DF	(El Salvador) Roberto Martínez	Substituted off
DF	(El Salvador) Roberto Hernández el Negro
DF	(El Salvador) Mario Mayen Meza
MF	(El Salvador) William Torres Alegría
MF	(El Salvador) Alexander Amaya del Cid
MF	(Uruguay) Darío Larrosa
MF	(El Salvador) Erber Burgos
FW	(Brazil) Rodinei Martins	Substituted off
FW	(Brazil) Mauro Nunes
Substitutes:
FW	(Brazil) Marcio Sampaio	Substituted on
MF	(El Salvador) Otoniel Carranza	Substituted on
MF	(El Salvador) Morales	Substituted on
Manager:
(Uruguay) Saul Lorenzo Rivero

FAS:
GK	(El Salvador) William Machón
DF	(El Salvador) William Osorio
DF	(El Salvador) Rafael Tobar (yellow card)
DF	(El Salvador) Marvin González
DF	(El Salvador) Nelson Nerio (yellow card)
DF	(Uruguay) Pablo Quiñónez	Substituted off
MF	(Uruguay) Alejandro Soler
MF	(El Salvador) Gilberto Murgas	Substituted off
MF	(El Salvador) Eliseo Quintanilla	Substituted off
FW	(Peru) Antonio Serrano
FW	(Argentina) Alejandro de la Cruz Bentos
Substitutes:
DF	(El Salvador) René Peñate	Substituted on
MF	(El Salvador) Gerardo Burgos	Substituted on
FW	(El Salvador) Francisco Ramírez	Substituted on
Manager:
(El Salvador) Rubén Guevara

Clausura 2001 champion

13th title

== Top scorers ==
Pos	Player	Team	Goals
1.	(El Salvador) Rudis Corrales	Municipal Limeño	13
2.	(El Salvador) TBD	TBD	-
3.	(El Salvador) TBD	TBD	-
4.	(El Salvador) TBD	TBD	-
5.	(El Salvador) TBD	TBD	-

== List of foreign players in the league ==
This is a list of foreign players in Apertura 2001. The following players:

1. have played at least one apertura game for the respective club.
2. have not been capped for the El Salvador national football team on any level, independently from the birthplace

ADET

- (Bolivia) Claudio Lozano
- (Bolivia) Sergio Machado

Águila

- (Brazil) Marcio Sampaio
- (Brazil) Rodinei Martins
- (Argentina) Adrian Mahia
- (Brazil) Mauro Nunes
- (Uruguay) Darío Larrosa

Alianza F.C.

- (Guatemala) Eduardo Cocherari
- (Uruguay) Raul Falero
- (Uruguay) Carlos Villareal
- (Uruguay) Alejandro Curbelo
- (Uruguay) Alejandro Larrea
- (Mexico) Alvaro Motta Otra

Atletico Balboa

- (Honduras) Franklin Webster
- (Brazil) Luis Sergio Pereira
- (Brazil) Evandro Guimaraes
- (Brazil) Elvis Pererira
- (Bolivia) Javier Vargas

Atletico Marte

- (Argentina) Emiliano Pedrozo
- (Dominican Republic) Óscar Mejía
- (Argentina) Pablo Leguizamo
- (Brazil) Alex Machado
- (Mexico) Andres Ortega Mora

(player released mid season) (player Injured mid season) Injury replacement player

Dragon

- (Argentina) Jorge Leonardo Garay
- (Brazil) Moisés Canalonga
- (Honduras) Williams Reyes
- (Uruguay) Bruno Ferri
- (Colombia) John Gamboa

C.D. FAS

- (Argentina) Alejandro Bentos
- (Uruguay) Claudio Pasadi
- (Uruguay) Pablo Quiñones
- (Uruguay) Alejandro Soler
- (Peru) Antonio Serrano

C.D. Luis Ángel Firpo

- (Brazil) Mauricio Dos Santos
- (Panama) Pércival Piggott
- (Uruguay) Washington Hernández
- (Chile) Raul Toro

Municipal Limeno

- (Peru) Jahir Camero
- (Honduras) Luis Alfredo Ramirez
- (Honduras) Gustavo Gallegos

San Luis Talpa

- (Argentina) Gabriel Alvarez
- (Argentina) Walter Capozucchi
- (Argentina) Ramiro Zepeda
- (Costa Rica) José Alberto Solano
- (Honduras) Hugo Sarmiento
- (Honduras) Alfred Boden
