= Primera División de Fútbol Profesional – Apertura 1999 =

Primera División de Fútbol de El Salvador
- Champions: Aguila (12th title)
- Relegated: None
- Top goalscorer: (El Salvador) Waldir Guerra (10)
- Biggest home win: L.A. Firpo 7-0 Juventud Olimpica Metalio (August 28, 1999)
- Biggest away win: Juventud Olimpica Metalio 0-8 Aguila (November 7, 1999)

The Primera División de Fútbol Profesional Apertura 1999 season (officially "Copa Pilsener Apertura 1999") started on August 28, 1999, and finished on December 26, 1999.

The season saw Águila win its 12th league title after a 1-0 victory over Municipal Limeno in the final.

'.

== Promotion and relegation ==
Promoted from Segunda División de Fútbol Salvadoreño as of 1999.

- Champions: Juventud Olimpica Metalio

Relegated to Segunda División de Fútbol Salvadoreño as of 1999.

- Last place: C.D. Sonsonate

== Notable events ==
=== Name Change ===
After round 8 of this season, Árabe Marte reverted to their historic name of Atlético Marte

=== Notable death from middle of 1999 season and end of 1999 season ===
The following people associated with the Primera Division have died between the middle of 1999 and end of 1999.

- Jose Reyes Chingolo Rodriguez (ex Argentinian FAS player)

== Team information ==
=== Personnel and sponsoring ===
Team	Chairman	Head coach	Kitmaker	Shirt sponsor
ADET	(El Salvador)	(Argentina) Juan Quarterone	Garcis	Nil
Águila	(El Salvador)	(Argentina) Hugo Coria	Garcis	Nil
Alianza	(El Salvador)	(Chile) Hernán Carrasco	Lanzera	Nil
Árabe Marte	(El Salvador) TBD	(El Salvador) José Luis Rugamas	Garcis	Nil
C.D. Dragón	(El Salvador) TBD	(Paraguay) Nelson Brizuela	Garcis	Telecom
FAS	(El Salvador) TBD	(Uruguay) Juan Masnik	ABA Sport	LG
Juventud Olímpica Metalio	(El Salvador) TBD	(Guatemala) Walter Cifuentes	Garcis	Nil
Firpo	(El Salvador) TBD	(Chile) Julio Escobar	Galaxia	Pepsi
Municipal Limeño	(El Salvador) TBD	(El Salvador) Oscar Emigdio Benítez	Garcis	Nil
Santa Clara	(El Salvador) TBD	(El Salvador) Manuel Mejía	Garcis	Nil

== Managerial changes ==
=== Before the start of the season ===
Team	Outgoing manager	Manner of departure	Date of vacancy	Replaced by	Date of appointment	Position in table
FAS	(El Salvador) Óscar Emigdio Benítez	TBD	June 1999	(Uruguay) Juan Masnik	June 1999	2nd (Clausura 1999)
Águila	(El Salvador) Juan Ramón Paredes	Sacked	June 1999	(Argentina) Hugo Coria	June 1999	4th (Clausura 1999)
Municipal Limeno	(El Salvador) Victor Manuel Pacheco	TBD	July 1999	(El Salvador) Oscar Emigdio Benítez	July 1999	7th (Clausura 1999)

=== During the season ===
Team	Outgoing manager	Manner of departure	Date of vacancy	Replaced by	Date of appointment	Position in table
C.D. Juventud Olímpica Metalio	(Guatemala) Walter Cifuentes	Sacked	September 1999	(El Salvador) Mauro Liberia	October 1999	
Atletico Marte	(El Salvador) José Luis Rugamas	Resigned	September 1999	(El Salvador) Juan Ramón Paredes	September 1999	
FAS	(Uruguay) Juan Masnik	Resigned	October 1999	(El Salvador) Rubén Guevara	October 1999	
Alianza	(Chile) Hernan Carrasco Vivanco	Resigned	November 1999	(Italy) Rene Renucci	November 1999	

== League standings ==
Pos	Team	Pld	W	D	L	GF	GA	GD	Pts	Qualification or relegation
1	C.D. Municipal Limeño	18	10	5	3	23	12	+11	35	Qualified to finals
2	C.D. Águila	18	9	6	3	32	12	+20	33	Qualified to finals
3	C.D. FAS	18	9	3	6	29	14	+15	30	Qualified to finals
4	Alianza F.C.	18	8	6	4	19	11	+8	30	Qualified to finals
5	C.D. Luis Ángel Firpo	18	7	5	6	21	16	+5	26	
6	ADET	18	6	6	6	20	19	+1	24	
7	C.D. Dragón	18	5	6	7	18	20	−2	21	
8	C.D. Santa Clara	18	6	2	10	18	29	−11	20	
9	Atlético Marte	18	3	8	7	17	25	−8	17	
10	C.D. Juventud Olímpica Metalio	18	2	3	13	8	47	−39	9	Relegated to Segunda División

== Semifinals 1st leg ==
December 9, 1999

Alianza F.C.	1-1	C.D. Municipal Limeño
Oscar Navarro 44'		Rudy Corrales 85'

Estadio Cuscatlan

December 10, 1999

C.D. Águila	3-2	C.D. FAS
Marcio Sampaio 35'; Roberto Hernandez 55'; Hector Baloyes 58'		Emiliano Pedrozo 10'; Miguel Mariano 74'

Estadio Juan Francisco Barraza

== Semifinals 2nd leg ==
December 18, 1999

C.D. FAS	2-1	C.D. Águila
Miguel Mariano 9'; Emiliano Pedrozo 59'		Carlos Escalante 90'

Estadio Oscar Quiteño

December 19, 1999

C.D. Municipal Limeño	0-0	Alianza F.C.
Nil		Nil

Estadio Jose Ramon Flores

== Final ==
December 30, 1999

C.D. Águila	1-0	C.D. Municipal Limeño
Erber Burgos 110'		None

Estadio Nacional de la Flor Blanca

Águila
GK	(El Salvador) Raul Garcia
DF	(El Salvador) Roberto Martínez
DF	(El Salvador) Mario Mayén Meza
DF	(El Salvador) Roberto Hernández
DF	(El Salvador) Néstor Morales
MF	(El Salvador) Ronald Cálix	Substituted off
MF	(El Salvador) Erber Burgos
MF	(El Salvador) Álex Amaya del Cid	Substituted off
MF	(Argentina) Carlos Escalante
FW	(Brazil) Marcio Sampaio
FW	(Colombia) Héctor Baloyes	Substituted off
Substitutes:
FW	(El Salvador) Kilmar Jiménez	Substituted on
MF	(El Salvador) José Luis Ferrera	Substituted on
MF	(El Salvador) Waldir Guerra	Substituted on
Manager:
(Argentina) Hugo Coria

Municipal Limeño:
GK	(El Salvador) Santos Rivera
DF	(El Salvador) Manuel Carranza
DF	(El Salvador) César Hernández
DF	(El Salvador) Elmer Martínez
DF	(El Salvador) Edwin González
DF	(El Salvador) Oris Velásquez (substituted off)
MF	(El Salvador) Rene Galan
MF	(Honduras) German Alexis Rodríguez
MF	(El Salvador) Deris Umanzor
FW	(El Salvador) Magdonio Corrales
FW	(El Salvador) Rudis Corrales	Substituted off
Substitutes:
FW	(El Salvador) E Bonilla	Substituted on
FW	(Mexico) Roberto Ventura	Substituted on
Manager:
(El Salvador) Óscar Emigdio Benítez

Apertura 2000 champion

11th title

== Top scorers ==
Pos	Player	Team	Goals
1.	(El Salvador) Waldir Guerra	Águila	10
2.	(El Salvador) Rodrigo Osorio	Alianza F.C.	9
3.	(El Salvador) Magdonio Corrales	Municipal Limeño	8
4.	(Brazil) Celio Rodriguez	LA Firpo	7
5.	(El Salvador) Juan Carlos Panameño	ADET	7

== List of foreign players in the league ==
This is a list of foreign players in Apertura 1999. The following players:

1. have played at least one apertura game for the respective club.
2. have not been capped for the El Salvador national football team on any level, independently from the birthplace

ADET

- (Peru)

C.D. Águila

- (Argentina) Marcos Javier Leipo
- (Uruguay) Gonzalo Martin Camilli
- (Argentina) Carlos Escalante
- (Brazil) Marcio Sampaio
- (Colombia) Héctor Baloyes

Alianza F.C.

- (Brazil) Agnaldo De Oliveira
- (Uruguay) Alejandro Curbelo
- (Uruguay) Sergio Zasilla

Arabe Marte

- (Honduras) Edwin Giovanni Delgado Castillo
- (Dominican Republic) Oscar Mejía
- (Dominican Republic) Pedro Aquino
- (Dominican Republic) Luis Sánchez

Dragon

- (Paraguay) Edgar Osvaldo Alvarez
- (Paraguay) Luis Carlos Maldonado Brizuela
- (Costa Rica) Nicolás Watson

(player released mid season) (player Injured mid season) Injury replacement player

C.D. FAS

- (Argentina) Emiliano Pedrozo
- (Honduras) Miguel Mariano
- (Honduras) Jorge Wagner
- (Panama) Angel Luis Rodriguez
- (Panama) Brown

C.D. Luis Ángel Firpo

- (Brazil) Celio Rodríguez
- (Brazil) Mauricio Dos Santos
- (Chile) Raul Toro
- (Brazil) Nildeson
- (Panama) Fermin Sanchez

Juventud Olimpico

- (Honduras) Martín García
- (Honduras) Fernando Enrique Sarmiento

Municipal Limeno

- (Honduras) Armando Garcia Arrechiga
- (Honduras) German Alexis Rodríguez
- (Mexico) Roberto Ventura
- (Mexico) Armando García

Santa Clara

- (Honduras)
