= 1993–94 Primera División de Fútbol Profesional =

Primera División de Fútbol Profesional
- Season: 1993–94
- Champions: Alianza (5th Title)
- Relegated: Apaneca

The 1993–94 Primera División de Fútbol Profesional season also the Copa Taca is the 43rd tournament of El Salvador's Primera División since its establishment of the National League system in 1948. The tournament was scheduled to end on June 11, 1994. Alianza won the championship match against CD FAS.

== Teams ==
Team	City	Stadium	Head coach	Captain
Aguila	TBD	Estadio	(Chile) Nestor Matamala	(El Salvador)
Alianza	TBD	Estadio	(Brazil) Helio Rodriguez	(El Salvador) kin Canales
Apaneca	Ahuachapan	Estadio Simeon Magaña	(El Salvador) Cesar Acevedo	(Uruguay) Rubén Alonso
Atletico Marte	TBD	Estadio Cuscutlan	(El Salvador) Oscar Benitez	(El Salvador) Wilfredo Iraheta Sanabria
Baygon-ADET	TBD	Estadio	(El Salvador) Armando Contreras Palma	(El Salvador)
Cojutepeque	TBD	Estadio	(Argentina) Jorge Alberto Cruz Valladares	(El Salvador)
FAS	TBD	Estadio	(Paraguay) Nelson Brizuela	(El Salvador)
Firpo	TBD	Estadio	(North Macedonia) Kiril Dojčinovski	(El Salvador)
C.D. Municipal Limeno	TBD	Estadio	(El Salvador) Saul Molina	(El Salvador)
Tiburones	TBD	Estadio	(El Salvador) Demar Moran	(El Salvador)

== Managerial changes ==
=== Before the season ===
Team	Outgoing manager	Manner of departure	Date of vacancy	Replaced by	Date of appointment	Position in table
FAS	(Uruguay) Juan Masnik	Sacked	1993	(Paraguay) Nelson Brizuela	1993	
Cojutepeque	(El Salvador) TBD	Sacked	1993	(Argentina) Jorge Alberto Cruz Valladares	1993	
Municipal Limeno	(Paraguay) Nelson Brizuela	Mutual Consent, went on to be coach of FAS	1993	(El Salvador) Saúl Molina	1993	Newly Promoted
ADET	(El Salvador) Victor Manuel Pacheco	Sacked	1993	(El Salvador) Armando Contreras Palma	1993	
Tiburones FC	(El Salvador) TBD	Sacked	1993	(El Salvador) Demar Moran	1993	

=== During the season ===
Team	Outgoing manager	Manner of departure	Date of vacancy	Replaced by	Date of appointment	Position in table
Atletico Marte	(El Salvador) Oscar Benitez	Resigned	1994	(El Salvador) Mauricio Alvarenga	1994	
Alianza	(Brazil) Helio Rodriguez	Sacked	1994	(Uruguay) Gustavo Faral	1994	

== Final ==
June 11, 1994

Alianza	2-1	FAS
Milton Meléndez 45'; Sergio Bufarini 58'		Fulgencio Deonel Bordón 37'

Estadio Cuscatlán, San Salvador

Alianza:
GK	TBD	(El Salvador) Misael Alfaro
DF	TBD	(Uruguay) Adrian de La Cruz
DF	TBD	(Uruguay) Fernando Sosa
DF	TBD	(El Salvador) Mario Mayen Meza
DF	TBD	(El Salvador) William Enrique Chachagua
MF	TBD	(El Salvador) Héctor López
MF	TBD	(El Salvador) Milton Meléndez
MF	TBD	(El Salvador) Rene Duran
FW	TBD	(El Salvador) Joaquín Canales
FW	TBD	(Argentina) Sergio Bufarini
FW	TBD	(El Salvador) Óscar Ulloa
Substitutes:
MF	TBD	(Argentina) Hugo Neira
DF	TBD	(Uruguay) Efraín Burgos
Manager:
(Uruguay) Gustavo Faral

FAS:
GK	TBD	(El Salvador) Adolfo Menéndez
DF	TBD	(El Salvador) William Osorio
DF	TBD	(El Salvador) Luis Atilio Estrada
DF	TBD	(Argentina) Gabriel Perrone
DF	TBD	(El Salvador) German Saúl Romano
MF	TBD	(El Salvador) Guillermo Rivera
MF	TBD	(El Salvador) Efrain Alas
MF	TBD	(El Salvador) Erber Burgos
MF	TBD	(El Salvador) Jorge Rodriguez
FW	TBD	(El Salvador) Waldir Guerra
FW	TBD	(Argentina) Fulgencio Deonel Bordón
Substitutes:
MF	TBD	(El Salvador) William Renderos
FW	TBD	(El Salvador) Mágico González
Manager:
(Chile) Hernán Carrasco

== Records ==
=== Team records ===
- Best home records: TBD (00 points out of 33 points)
- Worst home records: TBD (0 points out of 33 points)
- Best away records : TBD (00 points out of 33 points)
- Worst away records : TBD (0 points out of 33 points)
- Most goals scored: TBD (79 goals)
- Fewest goals scored: TBD (33 goals)
- Fewest goals conceded : TBD (32 goals)
- Most goals conceded : TBD (76 goals)

=== Scoring ===
- Most goals in a match: 11 goals
  - Aguila 9–2 Municipal Limeno (May 1, 1994)
- Most goals by one team in a match: 9 goals
  - Aguila 9–2 Municipal Limeno (May 1, 1994)

== Top scorers ==
Pos	Player	Team	Goals
1.	(El Salvador) Raul Diaz Arce	LA Firpo	24
2	(El Salvador) Carlos Francisco Contreras	ADET	19
3.	(Uruguay) Ruben Alonso	Apaneca	18
4.	(El Salvador) Oscar Antonio Portillo	Alianza	16
5.	(El Salvador) German Guevara	Municipal Limeno	14
6.	(El Salvador) Oscar Cruz	Cojutepeque	12
7.	(Chile) Raul Toro	LA Firpo	11
8.	(Argentina) Hugo Coria	Aguila	11
9.	(Panama) Percival Piggot	Cojutepeque	11
10.	(El Salvador) Julio Ernesto Herrera	Atletico Marte	10
10.	(El Salvador) Guillermo Rivera	FAS	10

== List of foreign players in the league ==
This is a list of foreign players in 1993-1994. The following players:

1. have played at least one game for the respective club.
2. have not been capped for the El Salvador national football team on any level, independently from the birthplace

C.D. Águila

- (Argentina) Hugo Coria
- (Argentina) Ariel Goldman
- (Argentina) Héctor Fabián Arias
- (Argentina) Daniel Messina

Alianza F.C.

- (Argentina) Martin Di Luca
- (Argentina) Sergio Bufarini
- (Argentina) Hugo Neira
- (Uruguay) Hernán Fernando Sosa

Apaneca FC

- (Uruguay) Ruben Alonso
- (Uruguay) Raúl Esnal
- (Uruguay) Richard Raffo

Atletico Marte

- (Argentina) Marcelo Bruno
- (Uruguay) Alberto Bica
- (Uruguay) Mario Figueroa
- (Uruguay) Fabián Tejera

Baygon-ADET

- (Honduras) Jorge Martinez Ogaldes

(player released mid season) (player Injured mid season) Injury replacement player

Cojutepeque

- (Brazil) Eraldo Correia
- (Panama) Pércival Piggott

C.D. FAS

- (Argentina) Fulgencio Deonel Bordón
- (Argentina) Gabriel Perrone

C.D. Luis Ángel Firpo

- (Brazil) Fernando de Moura

Limeno

- (Costa Rica) Martín Jiménez
- (Costa Rica) Miguel Segura
- (Honduras) Idelfonso Bonilla

Tiburones

- (Honduras)
