= Records and Statistics of the Primera División de Fútbol Profesional =

Football league statistics

The following is a compilation of notable records and statistics of teams, players and seasons in Primera División.

== All time League Records ==
=== Titles ===
- Most top-flight League titles: 17, C.D. FAS
- Most consecutive League titles: 7,
  - Hércules (Amateur Era) 1927, 1928, 1929–30, 1930–31, 1931–32, 1932–33, 1933–34
  - Atlético Marte (Professional Era) 3- 1955, 1955–56 and 1956–57
  - Firpo (Professional Era) 3- 1990, 1991 and 1992–93

=== Top flight appearances ===
- Most Appearances: 64
  - C.D. FAS (1948–present)

=== Records ===
==== Team ====
- Most league goals scored in a season: 88, Atletico Marte (1978-1979)
- Fewest league goals scored in a season: 8, Juventud Olimpica Metalio (1999 Apertura)
- Most league goals conceded in a season: 111, Cojutepeque F.C. (1994–95)
- Fewest league goals conceded in a season:, ()
- Biggest Win: C.D. Luis Angel Firpo 11-0 Cojutepeque F.C., 30 April 1995
- Best undefeated streak: Atletico Marte 20 games (10 wins and 10 draws), 1985 season
- First team that bought another team spot in the Primera División : Atlético Constancia buying Once Municipal for 1 colon in 1958.
- Most consecutive games won at home: 31 games Once Municipal (2016/2017) and Santa Tecla F.C. (2017/2018)

==== Individual ====
- Highest goal scorer of all time: Williams Reyes, 251 goals (2001-)
- First coach that has won a championship: Armando Chacón with Once Municipal in 1949.
- First foreign coach that's won a championship: Argentinian Alberto Cevasco with C.D. FAS in 1957-58.
- Most championship by a coach: Edwin Portillo won 7 titles with A.D. Isidro Metapan
- Most championship by a foreign coach: Chilean Hernán Carrasco Vivanco won 6 titles (Alianza-1965–66, 1966–67 and 1989–90, Atletico Marte -1968–69 and 1970, Aguila -1987–88)
- Most relegation by a team: 4, C.D. Dragon (1963/64, 1980–81, 1990–91, 2002-2003) and Once Municipal (1969–70, 1979–80, 2007–08 and 2012–13)
- Most goals scored in a game by one player : 7, Mario Aguila Zelaya with Firpo against Olimpic 7-0 (24 December 1950)
- Most goals by a top goalscorer: Argentinian Omar Muraco with 26 goals in 1958.
- Youngest player to play in the Primera División: 14 years old Ricardo Guevara Mora with Platense
- Oldest player in the Primera División: 43 years, 11 months and 1 day Magico Gonzales with San Salvador F.C. in 2002.
- First world cup champion player in the Primera División: Brazilian Zozimo played with C.D. Aguila in 1967–1969 (Champion with Brazil in Sweden 1958 and Chile 1962)
- First world cup player in the Primera División: Paraguayan Jorge Lino Romero played in the 1958 world cup with Atlante

== Records 1927–1997 ==
- Most league goals scored in a season (excluding playoffs): 83 goals, Alianza F.C. (1965–66)
- Fewest league goals scored in a season: 11, C.D. Sonsonate (1977–1978)
- Most league goals conceded in a season: 111, Cojutepeque F.C. (1994–1995)
- Fewest league goals conceded in a season: 6, C.D. FAS (1981)
- Biggest Win: C.D. Luis Angel Firpo 11-0 Cojutepeque F.C., 30 April 1995
- Record away win:
- Highest scoring game:
- Most wins in a row:
- Longest Undefeated streak: Atletico Marte 20 games, 1985 season
- Most championship won by a player:
- Most Championship by a coach:
- Longest Period of time by a coach (in the first division):
- Most consecutive championship: 7, Hércules (1927, 1928, 1929–30, 1930–31, 1931–32, 1932–33, 1933–34)
- Most seasons appearance: 64, C.D. FAS (1948–present)
- Most participants from one place:
- Most points in a season: 50 points, Alianza (1965–1966) and Juventud Olimpica (1971)
- Fewest points in a season: 2 points, San Jacinto (1950–51)
- Most Goals scored in a finals game:
- Most goals scored in a final game:
- Highest scoring game in a finals game:
- Most appearances (team) in the finals:
- Most defeats in a final series:
- Most defeats in a final:
- Most appearances in a final series without winning a championship:
- Lowest ranked winners:
- Lowest ranked finalists:
- Biggest win (aggregate):
- Most final series goals by an individual:
- Most goals by a losing side in a final game:
- Lowest finish by the previous season's champions:
- C.D. Aguila, C.D. Platense Municipal Zacatecoluca and Alianza F.C. that have won a championship in the season following their promotion to the Primera. They did so in
- Highest goal scorers during this period: David Arnoldo Cabrera, 240 goals (1967–1987)

== Records Clausura and Apertura (1998–) ==
- Most league goals scored in a season (excluding playoffs): 49, C.D. Aguila (Apertura 2001)
- Fewest league goals scored in a season: 8, C.D. Juventud Olímpica Metalio (1999 Apertura)
- Most league goals conceded in a season: 53, C.D. San Clara (2000 Apertura)
- Fewest league goals conceded in a season:9 (occurred three times), C.D. FAS (2009 Apertura), and C.D. Aguila twice (2009 Apertura & Clausura 2010)
- Biggest Win: 10 goals, Municipal Limeno 10-0 Santa Clara, 22 November 2000
  Aguila 10-0 Juventud Independiente, 23 August 2008
- Record away win: 8 goals, Fuerte San Francisco 0-8 FAS, 27 July 2025
- Highest scoring game:
- Most wins in a row:
- Best start to a season: Municipal Limeno 6 straight wins (Apertura 2000)
- Worst start to a season: UES 6 straight defeats (Clausura 2014)
- teams with the fewest wins in a season: Municipal Limeno (Apertura 2004) and Alacranes del Norte (Clausura 2010) with 0 games.
- Best undefeated streak: FAS (2003 season) and Isidro Metapan (2002 season) 18 games
- Most losses in a row: Once Municipal from round 12 Apertura 2012 to round 2 Clausura 2013 (9 games)
- Most championship won by a player: 10 by Hector Omar Mejia with A.D. Isidro Metapan.
- Most Championship by a coach: 7 by Edwin Portillo with A.D. Isidro Metapan.
- Longest period of time by a coach:
- Most consecutive championship won under the Clausura/ Apertua Format: 5 ( Clausura 2002, Apertura 2002, Apertura 2003, Clausura 2004, Clausura 2005,), C.D. FAS
- Most seasons in an Apertura/Clausura format:
- Fewest appearances in an Apertura/Clausura format:
- Most participants from one place:
- Most points in a season: 44 points, C.D. FAS (2003 Clausura)
- Fewest points in a season: 5 points (twice), Alcranes del Norte (Clausura 2010) and Once Municipal (Apertura 2012)
- Most Goals scored in a finals game:
- Top goalscorer in a final game: Williams Reyes 7 goals
- Most appearances in a grand final: 14, Alfredo Pacheco, Marvin Gonzalez, Cristiam Alvarez
- Most appearances in a final game: Williams Reyes y Alejandro Bentos
- Highest scoring game in a finals game:
- Most appearances (team) in the finals: 25 times Firpo (as of Apertura 2012)
- Most defeats in a final series: 23, Firpo (as of Apertura 2012)
- Most defeats in a final: 8, C.D. FAS (as of Apertura 2012)
- Most appearances in a final series without winning a championship: 7, C.D. Municipal Limeno
- Lowest ranked winners:
- Lowest ranked finalists:
- Biggest win (aggregate): 6 (twice), A.D. Isidro Metapan 6-0 Nejapa F.C. (Clausura 2009)
  C.D. Municipal Limeno 7-1 Atletico Balboa (Clausura 2000)
- Most final series goals by an individual:
- Most goals by a losing side in a final game:
- C.D. Vista Hermosa is the only team that have won a championship in the season following their promotion to the Primera. They did so in
- Lowest finish by the previous season's champions: Dragon 11th (Apertua 2016)
- Most goals scored by Goalkeeper: Alvaro Misael Alfaro (31 goals)
- Fastest goal scored in the tournament: Uruguayan Jorge Garay with Dragon in 7 seconds.
- First goal scored in clausura-apertura format: Magdonio Corrales with C.D. Municipal Limeno in 1998 against Santa Clara.
- First red card given in the clausura-apertura format: Mario Elías Guevara with Alianza F.C. in 1998 against C.D. Dragon
- Player with appearance with the most team: Julio Castro with 11 clubs (ADET, Arcense, San Salvador FC, Firpo, Alianza, Metapán, Águila, Balboa, Once Municipal, UES and FAS)
- Player with most own goals: Selvin Zepeda with 5 goals (2 with ADET, 1 with San Salvador FC, Nejapa and Alacranes del Norte)
- Youngest player to score a hat-trick: Colombian Bryan Gil for FAS against El Vencedor (18 Years and 4months)
- lowest game attendance in the Primera División: Alacranes del Norte-Metapán with 66 peoples in the Clausura 2010. the locals lost 881 dollars/\.
- Highest grand final attendance in the Primera División: 34, 212 people between FAS and Aguila (2003 Apertura)

== Goalscorers Record ==
=== Top goal scorers of all time ===
#	Name	Country	Clubs	Career	Goals
1	Nicolás Muñoz	(Panama)	Chalatenango, FAS, Aguila, Alianza F.C., Vista Hermosa, Isidro Metapan, Firpo, Pasaquina, El Vencedor, Limeno	2004-2022	303
1	Williams Reyes	(El Salvador) (Honduras)	C.D. Dragon, C.D. FAS, A.D. Isidro Metapan, Firpo, C.D. Chalatenango	2000-2017	294
3	David Arnoldo Cabrera	(El Salvador)	C.D. FAS	1967-1987	240
4	Luis Ramírez Zapata	(El Salvador)	C.D. Aguila, Alianza F.C., Atlético Marte	1971–1976, 1979, 1980-1992	184
5	Rodolfo Zelaya	(El Salvador)	Alianza F.C., Chalatenango	2012-2013,2015-2025	158
6	Oscar Gustavo Guerrero	(El Salvador)	Excelsior FC, Platense, UCA, Once Municipal, Independiente F.C., Aguila	1969-1986	157
7	Sergio Mendez	(El Salvador)	Aguila, Atletico Marte	1962-1975	151
8	Ruben Alonso	(Uruguay)	Alianza F.C., Fuerte San Francisco, Apaneca, Tiburones, ADET, Municipal Limeno	1985-1987, 1991-1995	139
8	Raul Diaz Arce	(El Salvador)	C.D. Dragon, Firpo, C.D. Aguila	1988-1996, 2002	137
9	Hugo Coria	(Argentina)	C.D. Aguila	1989-1994	132
10	Miguel Gonzales	(El Salvador)	Alianza F.C., ANTEL, Atletico Marte	1969-1981	130
11	Rudis Corrales	(El Salvador)	C.D. Municipal Limeno, C.D. Aguila, Alianza F.C., C.D. Dragon	1999-2011	129
12	Ruben Alonso	(Uruguay)	Alianza F.C., Fuerte San Francisco, Apaneca, C.D. Sonsonate, ADET, C.D. Municipal Limeño	1985-1987, 1991-1999	128

=== Top goal scorers in the League Format ===
#	Name	Country	Clubs	Career	Goals
1	David Arnoldo Cabrera	(El Salvador)	C.D. FAS	1967-1987	240
2	Luis Ramírez Zapata	(El Salvador)	C.D. Aguila, Alianza F.C.	1971–1976, 1979, 1980-1992	184
3	Oscar Gustavo Guerrero	(El Salvador)	Excelsior FC, Platense, UCA, Once Municipal, Independiente F.C., C.D. Aguila	1969-1986	157
4	Sergio Mendez	(El Salvador)	C.D. Aguila, Atletico Marte	1962-1975	151
5	Raul Diaz Arce	(El Salvador)	C.D. Dragon, Firpo, C.D. Aguila	1988-1996, 2002	137
6	Hugo Coria	(Argentina)	Aguila	1989-1994	132
7	Miguel Gonzales	(El Salvador)	Alianza F.C., ANTEL, Atletico Marte	1969-1981	130
TBD	Juan Ramón Martínez	(El Salvador)	Alianza F.C., Juventud Olímpica Metalio, Tiburones FC, Atletico Marte		126
TBD	Francisco Contreras	(El Salvador)	ADET, Aguila, San Salvador F.C.		121
TBD	Odir Jacques	(Brazil)	Alianza F.C., FAS, Sonsonate, Atletico Marte	1967-1970	120
8	Ruben Alonso	(Uruguay)	Alianza F.C., Fuerte San Francisco, Apaneca, C.D. Sonsonate, ADET, C.D. Municipal Limeño	1985-1987, 1991-1999	118
TBD	Félix Pineda	(El Salvador)	Aguila	1969-1988	106
TBD	Rodrigo Osorio	(El Salvador)	Alianza F.C., Juventud Olímpica Metalio, Tiburones FC, Atletico Marte	1988-2002	106

=== Top goal scorers in the Apertura/Clausura Format ===
#	Name	Country	Clubs	Career	Goals
1	Nicolás Muñoz	(Panama)	Chalatenango, FAS, Aguila, Alianza F.C., Vista Hermosa, Isidro Metapan, Firpo, Pasaquina, El Vencedor, Municipal Limeno	2004-2022	303
2	Williams Reyes	(El Salvador) (Honduras)	C.D. Dragon, C.D. FAS, A.D. Isidro Metapan, C.D. Aguila, C.D. Chalatenango, C.D. Luis Angel Firpo	2000-2017	294
3	Rodolfo Zelaya	(El Salvador)	C.D. Chalatenango, Alianza F.C.	2008-2013, 2015-2025	158
4	Rudis Corrales	(El Salvador)	C.D. Municipal Limeno, C.D. Aguila, Alianza F.C., C.D. Dragon	1999-2011	129
5	Franklin Webster	(Honduras)	Chalatenango, FAS, Balboa, Vista Hermosa, San Salvador, Nejapa	2000-2010	114
6	Emiliano Pedrozo	(Argentina) (El Salvador)	Aguila, FAS, Nejapa, Santa Clara, San Salvador, Metapan	1998-2010	114
7	Anel Canales	(Panama)	C.D. Luis Angel Firpo, Once Municipal, A.D. Isidro Metapan	2003-2013	110
8	Alexander Campos	(El Salvador)	C.D. Aguila, Alianza F.C., C.D. Luis Angel Firpo, Balboa, Once Municipal, UES, Juventud Independiente, C.D. Pasaquina	2003-	110
9	Alejandro de la Cruz Bentos	(Argentina)	C.D. FAS, Nejapa F.C.	2001-2015	106
10	Adonai Martínez	(El Salvador)	Alianza F.C., C.D. Chalatenango, C.D. Luis Angel Firpo, San Salvador, Once Municipal	1998-2007	98
15	**Ricardinho**	(Brazil)	Santa Tecla F.C., Isidro Metapan, Atletico Marte	2013-2021	93
11	Juan Carlos Reyes	(Uruguay)	Atlético Balboa, Once Municipal, Nejapa F.C., Luis Ángel Firpo A.D. Isidro Metapan, Juventud Independiente	2003-2013	78
12	**Paolo Suarez**	(Uruguay)	C.D. FAS, A.D. Isidro Metapan, C.D. Sonsonate	2005-2012, 2015-2016, 2016–	71
TBD	Bladimir Diaz	(Colombia)	Alianza F.C., C.D. Chalatenango	2016-2019	71
13	Cristian Gil Mosquera	(Colombia)	C.D. Vista Hermosa, Atletico Balboa, San Salvador F.C., UES	2005-2017	70
14	Patricio Barroche	(Argentina)	C.D. Vista Hermosa, Firpo, C.D. Aguila	2005-2010	70
31	**Oscar Ceren**	(El Salvador)	Alianza F.C., A.D. Isidro Metapan	2009-2020	68
29	**Tony Rugamas**	(El Salvador)	C.D. Aguila, C.D. FAS, Alianza F.C., A.D. Isidro Metapan, Once Deportivo de Ahuachapan	2011-2019,2020-	65
16	Fredy Gonzales Vichez	(El Salvador)	Firpo, FAS, Aguila, Metapan, San Salvador F.C., C.D. Chalatenango	1998-2009	65
17	Jose Manuel "Black" Martinez	(El Salvador)	Atletico Balboa, C.D. Luis Angel Firpo, San Salvador F.C., Nejapa F.C., C.D. Chalatenango	1999-2010	62
19	Alex Erazo	(El Salvador)	C.D. Aguila, Alianza F.C., C.D. Luis Angel Firpo, Juventud Independiente, UES	2003-2013	62
18	Juan Carlos Portillo	(El Salvador)	Juventud Independiente, Alianza F.C.		61
18	Osael Romero	(El Salvador)	C.D. Vista Hermosa, C.D. Aguila, Alianza F.C.	2006-2013	60
20	Lester Blanco	(El Salvador)	C.D. FAS, Atletico Marte, A.D. Isidro Metapan, Atletico Marte, Santa Tecla F.C.	2007-2019	60
21	Alexander Obregon	(Colombia)	C.D. FAS, C.D. Chalatenango, Independiente Nacional 1906, C.D. Luis Ángel Firpo, San Salvador F.C.	2002-2009	59
22	Cesar Larios	(El Salvador)	C.D. FAS, A.D. Isidro Metapan, UES, Atletico Marte, C.D. Aguila, Juventud Independienete	2005-2014, 2015	59
23	Josue Flores	(El Salvador)	C.D. FAS, A.D. Isidro Metapan, C.D. Aguila,	2006-2018	59
24	Eliseo Quintanilla	(El Salvador)	C.D. FAS, C.D. Aguila, Alianza F.C., A.D. Isidro Metapan, C.D. Luis Angel Firpo, San Salvador F.C.	1999-2014	58
25	Celio Rodríguez	(Brazil)	C.D. Luis Angel Firpo	1998-2001	56
26	Mauro Núñez Bastos	(Brazil)	C.D. Aguila	2001-2003	55
28	Sean Fraser	(Jamaica)	Once Municipal, Alianza F.C., C.D. Dragon	2011-2015	53
30	José Orlando Martínez	(El Salvador)	Atletico Marte, San Salvador F.C., C.D. Luis Angel Firpo, Alianza F.C.	2000-2010	52
32	Carlos Ayala	(El Salvador)	C.D. Chalatenango, UES, Atletico Marte	2004-2016	49
33	Dennis Alas	(El Salvador)	San Salvador F.C., Firpo	2001-2013	49
34	Alfredo Pacheco	(El Salvador)	C.D. FAS, C.D. Aguila, A.D. Isidro Metapan	2000-2013	49
35	Elias Montes	(El Salvador)	C.D. FAS, A.D. Isidro Metapan, C.D. Aguila,	1998-2012	47
36	Emerson Umaña	(El Salvador)	C.D. FAS, A.D. Isidro Metapan, C.D. Aguila, Santa Tecla F.C.	2001-2013	43
37	Nestor Ayala	(Paraguay)	Once Lobos, Atletico Balboa, C.D. FAS	2004-2007	43
38	William Torres	(El Salvador)	C.D. Aguila		43
39	Gabriel Garcete	(Paraguay)	C.D. Chalatenango, Atlético Balboa, C.D. Municipal Limeno, C.D. FAS, A.D. Isidro Metapan, UES	2005-2013	43

Note: Players in bold text are still active in the Primera División.

Last updated: 6 May 2013 (after round 18 of the Clausura championship).

== Appearances Record ==
=== Top Appearances in the Apertura/Clausura Format ===
#	Name	Country	Clubs	Career	Appearances
1	Williams Reyes	(El Salvador)	C.D. FAS, A.D. Isidro Metapan, C.D. Dragon, Firpo, Chalatenango	2000-2017	500
1	William Osorio	(El Salvador)	C.D. FAS, A.D. Isidro Metapan, C.D. Luis Angel Firpo, C.D. Chalatenango	1990-2007	495
2	**Ramiro Carballo**	(El Salvador)	C.D. Universidad de El Salvador, A.D. Isidro Metapan, Alianza F.C., San Salvador F.C.	1997-2017	600
3	Mario Elias Guevara	(El Salvador)	Once Municipal, Alianza F.C.	1996-2008	490
5	Rudis Corrales	(El Salvador)	C.D. Municipal Limeno C.D. Aguila, Alianza F.C.	1996-2008	421
TBD	Alvaro Misael Alfaro	(El Salvador)	, A.D. Isidro Metapan, C.D. Aguila, Alianza F.C.		400+
TBD	Adolfo Menéndez	(El Salvador)	C.D. FAS C.D. Aguila, A.D. Isidro Metapan	TBD	400+
TBD	Emiliano Pedrozo	(Argentina)	A.D. Isidro Metapan C.D. FAS, Nejapa F.C., Atletico Marte	TBD	400+
TBD	**Manuel "Meme" González**	(El Salvador)	A.D. Isidro Metapan, C.D. Vista Hermosa, C.D. FAS, C.D. Luis Angel Firpo, C.D. Aguila, C.D. Universidad de El Salvador	TBD	400

Note: Players in bold text are still active in the Primera División.

Last updated: 13 April 2013 (after round 13 of the Clausura championship).
