= Primera División de Fútbol Profesional – Apertura 2000 =

Primera División de Fútbol de El Salvador
- Champions: C.D. Aguila (12th title)
- Relegated: C.D. Santa Clara de El Salvador
- Top goalscorer: (Honduras) Williams Reyes (17)

The Primera División de Fútbol Profesional Apertura 2000 season (officially "Torneo Apertura 2000") started on August 26, 2000, and finished on December 30, 2000.

The season saw C.D. Águila win its 12th league title after a 3–2 victory over C.D. Municipal Limeno in the final.

== Team information ==
=== Personnel and sponsoring ===
Team	Chairman	Head coach	Kitmaker	Shirt sponsor
ADET	(El Salvador) Hector Palmoro Sol	(Argentina) Juan Quarterone	Garcis	Delsur
Águila	(El Salvador) Alejandro González	(Argentina) Hugo Coria	Joma	Oralite
Alianza	(El Salvador) Óscar Rodríguez	(El Salvador) Jaime Rodriguez	Milan	Soccerbest.com
Atletico Balboa	(El Salvador) TBD	(El Salvador) Jose Mario Martinez	Milan	TBD
Atlético Marte	(El Salvador) TBD	(El Salvador) Mauricio Pachín González	Garcis	TBD
Dragon	(El Salvador) TBD	(Paraguay) Nelson Brizuela	Galaxia	Telecom
FAS	(El Salvador) Reynaldo Valle	(El Salvador) Juan Ramón Paredes	Milan	LG Electronics
Firpo	(El Salvador) Joseph Arguedas	(Chile) Julio Escobar	Galaxia	Casino Colonial
Municipal Limeno	(El Salvador) Gumercindo Ventura	(Peru) Agustin Castillo	Galaxia	TBD
Santa Clara	(El Salvador) TBD	(El Salvador) Saul Molina	Garcis	TBD

== Managerial changes ==
=== Before the start of the season ===
Team	Outgoing manager	Manner of departure	Date of vacancy	Replaced by	Date of appointment	Position in table
Dragon	(El Salvador) Mauricio Alvarenga	TBD	July, 2000	(Paraguay) Nelson Brizuela	July 5, 2000	7th (Clausura 2000)
Alianza	(Argentina) Alfredo Obberti	TBD	July, 2000	(El Salvador) Jaime Rodriguez	July 5, 2000	5th (Clausura 2000)
FAS	(Brazil) Odir Jacques	TBD	July, 2000	(El Salvador) Juan Ramón Paredes	August, 2000	3rd (Clausura 2000)
Atletico Marte	(El Salvador) Juan Ramón Paredes	TBD	August __, 2000	(El Salvador) Mauricio Pachín González	August __, 2000	8th (Clausura 2000)

=== During the season ===
Team	Outgoing manager	Manner of departure	Date of vacancy	Replaced by	Date of appointment	Position in table
FAS	(El Salvador) Juan Ramón Paredes	Sacked	October 2000	(El Salvador) Cesar Acevedo Interim	October 2000	
FAS	(El Salvador) Cesar Acevedo Interim	moved to assistant	Oct 2000	(Brazil) Roberto Abruzzesse	October 2000	
FAS	(Brazil) Roberto Abruzzesse	Resigned	November 2000	(Uruguay) (Armenia) Garabet Avedissian	November 2000	
Santa Clara	(El Salvador) Saul Molina	Resigned	November 2000	(El Salvador) Manuel Mejía	November 2000	

== League standings ==
Pos	Team	Pld	W	D	L	GF	GA	GD	Pts	Qualification or relegation
1	Municipal Limeño	18	12	4	2	43	13	+30	40	Qualified to finals
2	LA Firpo	18	10	6	2	42	19	+23	36	Qualified to finals
3	Aguila	18	9	4	5	34	28	+6	31	Qualified to finals
4	Atletico Balboa	18	8	5	5	31	26	+5	29	Qualified to finals
5	Dragon	18	6	7	5	32	29	+3	25	
6	Alianza F.C.	18	4	9	5	25	25	0	21	
7	ADET	18	4	7	7	23	24	−1	19	
8	FAS	18	3	8	7	15	21	−6	17	
9	Atlético Marte	18	3	6	9	28	48	−20	15	
10	Santa Clara	18	1	4	13	13	53	−40	7	Relegated to Segunda Division

== Semifinals 1st leg ==
December 16, 2000

Aguila	3-0	LA Firpo
Mario Mayén Meza 5'; Adrián Mahía 49'; Jorge Rodríguez 91'		Nil

Estadio Juan Francisco Barraza

December 17, 2000

Limeno	3-0	Atletico Balboa
Carlos Villareal 38'; Deris Umanzor 52'; Rudis Corrales 77'		Nil

Estadio Jose Ramon Flores

== Semifinals 2nd leg ==
December 23, 2000

LA Firpo	2-2	Aguila
Celio Rodríguez 15' 61'		William Torres 7'; Márcio Sampaio 83'

Estadio Sergio Torres

Aguila won 5-2 on aggregate

December 23, 2000

Atletico Balboa	1-4	Limeno
Franklin Webster 78'		Carlos Villarreal 44'; Josué Galdámez 60'; Rudis Corrales 67'; Santos Rivera 91'

Estadio Marcelino Imbers

Limeno won 7-1 on aggregate

== Final ==
December 30, 2000

Águila	3–2	Municipal Limeño
Adrián Mahía 22'; Deonel Bordón 50' 84'		César Cahrún 63'; Josué Galdámez 66'

Estadio Nacional de la Flor Blanca
Attendance: 20,610

Aguila
GK	(El Salvador) Juan José Gómez
DF	(El Salvador) Néstor Morales
DF	(El Salvador) Mario Mayén Meza
DF	(El Salvador) Roberto Hernández
DF	(El Salvador) Roberto Martínez
MF	(El Salvador) William Torres Alegría (yellow card)
MF	(El Salvador) Erber Burgos
MF	(El Salvador) Jorge Rodríguez
MF	(Argentina) Adrián Mahía (yellow card)
FW	(Brazil) Marcio Sampaio
FW	(Argentina) Fulgencio Deonel Bordón
Substitutes:
FW	(El Salvador) Manuel López	Substituted on
MF	(El Salvador) Kilmar Jiménez	Substituted on
MF	(El Salvador) Waldir Guerra	Substituted on
Manager:
(Argentina) Hugo Coria

Municipal Limeno:
GK	(El Salvador) Santos Rivera
DF	(El Salvador) Marvin Perico Benítez
DF	(El Salvador) Elmer Pando Martínez (yellow card)
DF	(Peru) César Charum
DF	(El Salvador) Deris Umanzor (yellow card)
DF	(El Salvador) Rene Galan
MF	(Peru) Jahir Camero
MF	(El Salvador) Oris Velásquez
MF	(El Salvador) Manuel Carranza
FW	(El Salvador) Rudis Corrales
FW	(Colombia) Carlos Villarreal (yellow card)
Manager:
(Peru) Agustín Castillo

Apertura 2000 champion

12th title

== List of foreign players in the league ==
This is a list of foreign players in Apertura 2000. The following players:

1. have played at least one apertura game for the respective club.
2. have not been capped for the El Salvador national football team on any level, independently from the birthplace

ADET

- (Bolivia) Alexis Obregon

C.D. Águila

- (Argentina) Adrián Mahía
- (Argentina) Fulgencio Deonel Bordón
- (Brazil) Marcio Sampaio
- (Honduras) Miguel “Gallo” Mariano
- (Uruguay) Álvaro Crucci Silva

Alianza F.C.

- (Argentina) Horacio Lugo
- (Uruguay) Alejandro Curbelo
- (Uruguay) Raúl Falero

Atletico Balboa

- (Honduras) Franklin Webster
- (Honduras) Ernesto Aquino
- (Honduras) Enrique Reneau
- (Honduras) Hugo Sarmiento

Atletico Marte

- (Argentina) Emiliano Pedrozo
- (Dominican Republic) Óscar Mejía
- (Honduras) Camilo Bonilla

(player released mid season) (player Injured mid season) Injury replacement player

Dragon

- (Argentina) Saul Ye
- (Brazil) Moises Canalonga
- (Honduras) Williams Reyes
- (Honduras) Constantino Reyes
- (Nicaragua) Danny Téllez

C.D. FAS

- (Brazil) Anderson Batista
- (Brazil) Ricardo Correia
- (Brazil) Everildo Souza
- (Honduras) Jorge Wagner

C.D. Luis Ángel Firpo

- (Brazil) Mauricio Dos Santos
- (Brazil) Ever Da Silva
- (Chile) Raúl Toro
- (Uruguay) Washington Hernández

Municipal Limeno

- (Peru) Jair Camero
- (Peru) César Charún
- (Uruguay) Carlos Villarreal

Santa Clara

- (United States) David White

== Top scorers ==
Pos	Player	Team	Goals
1.	(El Salvador) Williams Reyes	Dragon	17
2.	(Colombia) Carlos Villarreal	Limeno	16
3.	(El Salvador) Fredy González	LA Firpo	9
4.	(El Salvador) Waldir Guerra	Aguila	6
5.	(Brazil) Ricardo Correia	FAS	6
6.	(El Salvador) Alexander Amaya	Aguila	5
7.	(Uruguay) Raúl Falero	Alianza	4
