= Primera División de Fútbol Profesional Apertura 2001 =

Primera División de Fútbol de El Salvador
- Champions: Alianza F.C. (8th title)
- Relegated: None
- Top goalscorer: TBD (12)

The Primera División de Fútbol Profesional Apertura 2001 season (officially "Torneo Apertura 2001"), started on August 26, 2001, and finished on December 23, 2001.

This season saw Alianza F.C. win its 8th league title after a 2-1 victory over C.D. Luis Ángel Firpo in the final.

This was the first season that saw promotion/relegation used on a once a year basis, rather than every six months as had been a custom in previous years. This meant that teams could now only be promoted/relegated once a year, after both the Apertura and Clausura seasons had ended. At which time, the teams promoted/relegated would be decided by comparing accumulated points on aggregate over both Apertura and Clausura seasons. At this point, the bottom team would automatically be relegated to the Segunda División de Fútbol Salvadoreño, while the winner of that division would be brought up to take their spot.

== Promotion and relegation ==
Promoted from Segunda División de Fútbol Salvadoreño as of August 26, 2001.

- A.D. Isidro Metapán

== Team information ==
=== Personnel and sponsoring ===
Team	Chairman	Head coach	Kitmaker	Shirt sponsor
ADET	(El Salvador)	(Argentina) Juan Quarterone	TBD	TBD
Águila	(El Salvador)	(Uruguay) Saul Lorenzo Rivero	TBD	TBD
Alianza	(El Salvador) Óscar Rodríguez	(El Salvador) Juan Ramón Paredes	TBD	TBD
Atlético Marte	(El Salvador) TBD	(Mexico) Jorge Martinez	TBD	TBD
C.D. Dragon	(El Salvador) TBD	(El Salvador) Miguel Aguilar	TBD	TBD
FAS	(El Salvador) Reynaldo Valle	(Peru) Agustín Castillo	TBD	TBD
Atletico Balboa	(El Salvador) TBD	(El Salvador) Oscar Benítez	TBD	TBD
Firpo	(El Salvador) TBD	(Federal Republic of Yugoslavia) Milos Miljanic	TBD	TBD
Municipal Limeno	(El Salvador) TBD	(North Macedonia) Kiril Dojčinovski	TBD	TBD
A.D. Isidro Metapán	(El Salvador) José Gumercindo Landaverde	(El Salvador) Edwin Portillo	TBD	TBD

== Managerial changes ==
=== Before the season ===
Team	Outgoing manager	Manner of departure	Date of vacancy	Replaced by	Date of appointment	Position in table
FAS	(El Salvador) Rubén Guevara	Resigned	June 2001	(Peru) Agustin Castillo	June 2001	
Alianza F.C.	(Uruguay) Carlos Reyes	TBD	June 2001	(El Salvador) Juan Ramón Paredes	June 2001	
Municipal Limeno	(Chile) Hernan Carrasco	Sacked	July 2001	(North Macedonia) Kiril Dojčinovski	July 2001	
Atletico Marte	(El Salvador) Mauricio Pachin Gonzales	TBD	July 2001	(Mexico) Jorge Martinez	July 2001	

=== During the season ===
Team	Outgoing manager	Manner of departure	Date of vacancy	Replaced by	Date of appointment	Position in table
Atletico Marte	(Mexico) Jorge Martinez	TBD	September 2001	(Paraguay) Nelson Brizuela	September 2001	
Dragon	(El Salvador) Miguel Aguilar	TBD	September 2001	(Ecuador) Alfredo Encalada	September 2001	
Atletico Marte	(Paraguay) Nelson Brizuela	TBD	October 2001	(El Salvador) Mauricio Pachin Gonzales	October 2001	
Atletico Balboa	(El Salvador) Óscar Emigdio Benítez	TBD	November 2001	(El Salvador) Saul Molina	November 2001	
Isidro Metapan	(El Salvador) Edwin Portillo	TBD	October 2001	(El Salvador) Oscar "Lagarto" Ulloa Interim	October 2001	
Isidro Metapan	(El Salvador) Oscar "Lagarto" Ulloa Interim	TBD	November 2001	(El Salvador) José Calazán Interim	November 2001	

== League standings ==
Pos	Team	Pld	W	D	L	GF	GA	GD	Pts	Qualification
1	Alianza F.C.	18	12	4	2	42	23	+19	40	Qualified to finals
2	C.D. Luis Ángel Firpo	18	9	6	3	36	21	+15	33	Qualified to finals
3	C.D. Águila	18	9	5	4	49	26	+23	32	Qualified to finals
4	C.D. Municipal Limeño	18	8	6	4	28	21	+7	30	Qualified to finals
5	C.D. FAS	18	7	8	3	30	15	+15	29	
6	A.D. Isidro Metapán	18	7	5	6	29	27	+2	26	
7	C.D. Atlético Balboa	18	5	3	10	19	32	−13	18	
8	C.D. Dragón	18	4	3	11	18	34	−16	15	
9	ADET	18	4	2	12	22	49	−27	14	
10	Atlético Marte	18	1	6	11	16	41	−25	9	

== Semifinals 1st leg ==
Dec 9, 2001

C.D. Águila	2-2	C.D. Luis Ángel Firpo

Estadio Juan Francisco Barraza

Dec 9, 2001

C.D. Municipal Limeño	2-2	Alianza F.C.

Estadio Jose Ramon Flores

== Semifinals 2nd leg ==
Dec 16, 2001

C.D. Luis Ángel Firpo	1-1	C.D. Águila

Estadio Sergio Torres

Dec 16, 2001

Alianza F.C.	0-0	C.D. Municipal Limeño

Estadio Cuscatlán

== Final ==
December 23, 2001

Alianza F.C.	2-1	C.D. Luis Ángel Firpo
Sandoval 31'; Martínez 119'		Montes 20'

Estadio Cuscatlán

Alianza
GK	(El Salvador) Miguel Montes
DF	(Argentina) Washington La Cruz
DF	(El Salvador) Ramiro Carballo
DF	(El Salvador) Mario Elias Guevara
DF	(El Salvador) Alexander Merino	(substituted off) 60'
MF	(El Salvador) Óscar Navarro (yellow card) 84'
MF	(Colombia) Jorge Sandoval
MF	(El Salvador) Juan Carlos Serrano (yellow card) 42'	(substituted off) 90'
MF	(El Salvador) Adonai Martínez
FW	(El Salvador) José Roberto Castillo	(substituted off) 61'
FW	(Colombia) Martín García (yellow card) 61'
Substitutes:
FW	(Colombia) Carlos Asprilla	(substituted on) 61'
MF	(El Salvador) Hugo Escobar	(substituted on) 90'
MF	(El Salvador) Miguel Riquelmi	(substituted on) 105'
Manager:
(El Salvador) Juan Ramón Paredes

Firpo:
GK	(El Salvador) Misael Alfaro
DF	(El Salvador) Wilman González	(substituted off) 89'
DF	(El Salvador) Hidsar Henríquez (yellow card) 104'
DF	(El Salvador) Mauricio Quintanilla
DF	(Argentina) Diego Alvarez
MF	(El Salvador) Héctor Canjura
MF	(El Salvador) Guillermo Morán (yellow card) 18'	(substituted off) 68'
MF	(El Salvador) Rafael Barrientos
MF	(El Salvador) Santos Cabrera	(substituted off) 65'
FW	(El Salvador) Elias Montes
FW	(Brazil) Celio Rodríguez
Substitutes:
DF	(El Salvador) René Durán (yellow card) 68'	(substituted on) 60'
FW	(El Salvador) Fredy González Víchez	(substituted on) 80'
FW	(El Salvador) Guillermo García	(substituted on) 89'
Manager:
(Federal Republic of Yugoslavia) Milos Miljanic

Apertura 2001 champion

8th title

== List of foreign players in the league ==
This is a list of foreign players in Apertura 2001. The following players:

1. have played at least one apertura game for the respective club.
2. have not been capped for the El Salvador national football team on any level, independently from the birthplace

ADET

- (Argentina) Walter Caposuchi
- (Honduras) Hugo Saramiento
- (Bolivia) Adrian Chavez

C.D. Águila

- (Argentina) Mariano Villegas
- (Brazil) Rodinei Martins
- (Brazil) Mauro Nunez
- (Brazil) Alexander Prediguer
- (Uruguay) Dario Larrosa

Alianza F.C.

- (Colombia) John Carlos Serna
- (Colombia) Luis Carlos Asprilla
- (Colombia) Jorge Sandoval
- (Colombia) Martin Garcia
- (Colombia) Edgar Montaño
- (Colombia) Fránklin Cabezas

Atletico Marte

- (Argentina) Andres Puig
- (Mexico) Roberto Clemente
- (Mexico) Ramon Rodriguez
- (Mexico) Javier Vargas
- (Bolivia) Paul Toro

Atletico Balboa

- (Argentina) Víctor Hugo Sánchez
- (Honduras) Franklin Webster
- (Honduras) Ernesto Aquino
- (Uruguay) Carlos Villarreal

(player released mid season) (player Injured mid season) Injury replacement player

Dragon

- (Argentina) Mariano Rodriguez
- (Ecuador) Carlos Castañeda
- (Ecuador) Fabio Zuniga
- (Colombia) José Fabio Caicedo
- (Peru) Jahir Camero
- (Venezuela) Luis Iseles

C.D. FAS

- (Argentina) Ariel Giles
- (Argentina) Alejandro Bentos
- (Costa Rica) Donny Grant Zamora
- (Honduras) Williams Reyes
- (Uruguay) Pablo Quiñónez

C.D. Luis Ángel Firpo

- (Argentina) Diego Alvarez
- (Brazil) Mauricio Dos Santos
- (Chile) Raul Toro
- (Mexico) Armando Garcia

A.D. Isidro Metapán

- (Brazil) Anderson Passos Batista
- (Brazil) Alejandro Morsche Rodríguez
- (Honduras) Hugo Saramiento
- (Honduras) Jorge Wagner
- (Uruguay) Claudio Pasadai

Municipal Limeno

- (Brazil) Roberto Ramos
- (Honduras) Luis Alfredo Ramirez
- (Honduras) Gustavo Gallegos
- (Uruguay) Raul Falero
- (Paraguay) Didilfo Guerrero
- (Germany) Marcus Kothner
