= List of head coaches of Águila =

Club Deportivo Aguila is a professional football club based in San Miguel, El Salvador, which plays in the Salvadoran league, Primera division. The first full-time manager for Aguila was Gregorio Bundio.

Conrado Miranda is the most successful manager in terms of trophies. He won three primera division titles and 1 CONCACAF Champions' Cup.

The second most successful Aguila manager in terms of trophies won is Hugo Coria, who won two Primera division titles and one Copa presidente trophy in his 4-year reign as manager.

== List of managers ==
This is a list of head coaches of the Salvadoran football club C.D. Águila. Since the club was formed, Águila have had 49 coaches

Table key

- Player-coach (team player that assumed simultaneously the role of coach)
- Caretaker coach (coach who assumed temporarily the job in the absence of the incumbent head coach or until a new head coach was hired)

No.	Nationality	Head coach	from	until	Honours
1	(Argentina)	Gregorio Bundio Núñez	1956	1957	
2	(Argentina)	Agustín Vicente Noriega	1957	1958	
3	(El Salvador)	Conrado Miranda	July 1959	May 1960	1 Championship
4	(Honduras)	Carlos Padilla	June 1960	June 1961	1 Championship
6	(El Salvador)	Alfredo Ruano	unknown	unknown	
7	(El Salvador)	Victor Manuel Ochoa	1963	December 1965	2 Championship
6	(Spain)	Lorenzo Ausina Tur	December 1965	unknown	
8	(Argentina)	Rodolfo Orlandini	1965	1965	
9	(Brazil)	Arnaldo Da Silva	1966	1966	
	(Brazil)	Silas Da Silva	1967	1968	
10	(Brazil)	Zózimo (Player/Coach)	1968	1968	1 Championship
	(Brazil)	Silas Da Silva	November 1968	1969	
11	(El Salvador)	Juan Francisco Barraza	1971	April 1974	1 Championship
12	(Chile)	Hernán Carrasco Vivanco	April 1974	December 1974	
13	(El Salvador)	Conrado Miranda	December 1974	1978	2 Championship, 1 CONCACAF Champions' Cup
14	(Chile)	Javier Mascaró	1978	1979	
15	(El Salvador)	Saúl Molina	1980	1980	
15	(El Salvador)	Conrado Miranda	1980	1981	
16	(El Salvador)	René Mena	1981	1981	
17	(El Salvador)	Saúl Molina	1981	1981	
18	(El Salvador)	Juan Francisco Barraza	1981	1983	1 Championship
19	(Chile)	Julio Escobar	1985	1985	
20	(Argentina)	Omar Muraco	1985	1985	
21	(Chile)	Hernán Carrasco Vivanco	1986	1988	1 Championship
TBD	(Socialist Federal Republic of Yugoslavia)	Milovan Đorić	1989	1989	
	(El Salvador)	Ricardo Guardado	90s	90s	
	(Argentina)	Hugo Luis Lencina	90s	90s	
	(El Salvador)	Conrado Miranda	90s	90s	
22	(Chile)	Néstor Matamala	1990	1991	1 Runner up
23	(Argentina)	Juan Quarterone	1992	1992	
24	(El Salvador)	Oscar Emigdio Benítez	1993	December 1995	
25	(El Salvador)	Juan Ramón Paredes	December 1995	February 1996	
26	(Serbia and Montenegro)	Milovan Đorić	February 1996	December 1996	
TBD	(Argentina)	Mario Carlos Rey Salgueiro	January 1997	February 1997	
27	(Serbia and Montenegro)	Mladen Stefanović	February 1997	September 1997	
TBD	(El Salvador)	Juan Ramón Paredes	September 1997	January 1998	
TBD	(Serbia and Montenegro)	Milovan Đorić	January 1998	April 1998	
TBD	(Cuba)	Lazaro Buchillon	April 1998	May 1998	
29	(Brazil)	Carlos Vieira	July 1998	October 1998	
TBD	(Serbia and Montenegro)	Miloš Miljanić	October 1998	April 1999	
TBD	(El Salvador)	Juan Ramón Paredes	April 1999	June 1999	
30	(Argentina)	Hugo Coria	July 1999	December 2000	2 Championship
31	(Uruguay)	Saul Lorenzo Rivero	January 2001	December 2001	1 Championship
32	(Argentina)	Hugo Coria	January 2002	September 2002	
33	(El Salvador)	Rubén Guevara	September 2002	December 2002	
34	(Honduras)	Ramón Maradiaga	February 2003	June 2003	
35	(Argentina)	Hugo Coria	June 2003	April 2004	
36	(Uruguay)	Julio César Cortés	June 2004	October 2004	
37	(Argentina)	Carlos Alberto de Toro	October 2004	December 2004	
38	(Argentina)	Jorge Alberto García	December 2004	December 2005	
17	(El Salvador)	Saúl Molina	December 2005	January 2006	
39	(Serbia)	Vladan Vićević	February 2006	December 2006	1 Championship
40	(Panama)	Gary Stempel	January 2007	June 2007	
41	(El Salvador)	Luis Ramírez Zapata	July 2007	November 2007	
42	(Peru)	Agustín Castillo	December 2007	December 2008	
43	(Argentina)	Pablo Centrone	December 2008	April 2009	
44	(Brazil)	Eraldo Correia	April 2009	December 2009	
45	(El Salvador)	Nelson Ancheta	December 2009	March 2010	
46	(Uruguay)	Rubén Alonso	March 2010	May 2010	
47	(Guatemala)	Carlos Mijangos	June 2010	August 2010	
48	(Brazil)	Eraldo Correia	September 2010	December 2010	
49	(Argentina)	Hugo Coria	January 2011	September 2011	
50	(El Salvador)	Omar David Sevilla	October 2011	December 2011	
51	(Brazil)	Eraldo Correia	December 2011	January 2012	
52	(El Salvador)	Víctor Coreas	January 2012	April 2013	1 Championship
53	(El Salvador)	Omar David Sevilla	April 2013	June 2013	
54	(Serbia)	Vladan Vićević	June 2013	September 2013	
55	(Honduras)	Raúl Martínez Sambulá	September 2013	February 2014	
56	(El Salvador)	Edwin Portillo	February 2014	March 2014	
57	(Colombia)	Jairo Ríos Rendón	March 2014	May 2014	
58	(Argentina)	Daniel Messina	June 2014	December 2014	
59	(Panama)	Julio Dely Valdés	December 2014	May 2015	
60	(Brazil)	Eraldo Correia ^{*}	May 2015	December 2015	
61	(El Salvador)	Juan Ramón Sánchez	December 2015	June 2016	
62	(Argentina)	Edgardo Malvestiti	June 2016	November 2016	
5	(Uruguay)	Darío Larrosa	November 2016	December 2016	
56	(Uruguay)	Jorge Daniel Casanova	December 2016	August 2017	
57	(Argentina)	Osvaldo Escudero	August 2017	February 2018	
58	(El Salvador)	Marvin Benítez (interim)	February 2018	March 2018	
59	(El Salvador)	Miguel Aguilar Obando	March 2018	June 2018	
60	(El Salvador)	Carlos Romero	July 2018	October 2019	1 Championship
61	(El Salvador)	Santos Noel Riviera (Interim)	October 2019	November 2019	
61	(Argentina)	Daniel Messina	November 2019	April 2020	
32	(Argentina)	Hugo Coria	April 2020	November 2020	
32	(Argentina)	Ernesto Corti	November 2020	February 2021	
33	(Colombia)	Armando Osma Rueda	February 2021	May 2021	
34	(Argentina)	Cristian Domizzi	May 2021	October 2021	
35	(Peru)	Agustín Castillo	October 2021	August 2022	
35	(Argentina)	Sebastian Bini	August 2022	May 2023	
35	(Argentina)	Ernesto Corti	May 2023	May 2024	1 Championship
35	(Argentina)	Daniel Messina	May 2024	September 2025	
35	(El Salvador)	Sergio Iván Muñoz (Interim)	September 2025	September 2025	
35	(Mexico)	Juan Carlos Chávez	September 2025	March 2026	
35	(El Salvador)	Isaac Zelaya	March 2026	April 2026	
35	(Argentina)	Santiago Davio	April 2026	Present	
