= Marcinho (footballer, born 1973) =

Brazilian footballer

Personal information
- Full name: Márcio Gomes Sampaio
- Date of birth: 16 March 1973 (age 53)
- Place of birth: Franco da Rocha, Brazil
- Position: Forward

Youth career
- 1988–1990: São Paulo

Senior career*
Years	Team	Apps	(Gls)
1990	São Paulo	14	(2)
1991–1992	Palmeiras	51	(3)
1995	Uberlândia		
1998–2001	Águila		

International career
1988–1989	Brazil U17		
- * Club domestic league appearances and goals as of 14 November 2023

Márcio Gomes Sampaio (born 16 March 1973), better known as Marcinho, is a Brazilian former professional footballer who played as a forward.

== Career ==
Revealed in the youth sectors of São Paulo FC, he played for the Brazil under-17 team in the 1988 South American Championship and the 1989 FIFA U-16 World Championship. He also became one of the youngest players to score for São Paulo FC, against EC São Bento in the 1990 Campeonato Paulista, with only 16 years. He also played for Palmeiras, Uberlândia and CD Águila, where he was Salvadorean national champion on two occasions.

== Honours ==
Brazil U17

- South American U-17 Championship: 1988

CD Águila

- Primera División de Fútbol de El Salvador: Apertura 1999, Apertura 2000
