= Otoniel Carranza =

Salvadoran footballer (born 1983)

Personal information
- Full name: Edwin Otoniel Carranza Solís
- Date of birth: 22 December 1983 (age 42)
- Place of birth: Intipucá, El Salvador
- Height: 1.83 m (6 ft 0 in)
- Position: Defender

Youth career
- 1997–1998: Águila (youth)

Senior career*
Years	Team	Apps	(Gls)
2000–2009	Águila		
2009–2010	Atlético Balboa		
2010–2011	ADI		
2012–2013	Juventud Independiente		
2013–2016	UES		
2016	Aspirante		
2017	Dragón		

International career
2004	El Salvador	3	(0)
- * Club domestic league appearances and goals

Edwin Otoniel Carranza Solís (born 22 December 1983) is a Salvadoran professional football player.

== Club career ==
=== Águila ===
Carranza began his career through the Águila youth system.

During his early career, he has won three national league titles with Águila (Apertura 2000, Clausura 2001 and Clausura 2006), and won a gold medal with El Salvador national team during the football matches of the 2002 Central American and Caribbean Games.

After winning the championship in 2006 he was called for play with the El Salvador national team, but he did not accept.

He had a chance to be in the national team again in 2008, but he had a minor abdominal pain that prevented him.

=== Atlético Balboa ===
In 2009 Carranza signed for Atlético Balboa, but left them later in that year due to not being paid by the club.

=== ADI F.C. ===
In 2010 Carranza signed with ADI F.C..

=== Juventud Independiente ===
In 2012 Carranza signed with Juventud Independiente.

=== UES ===
In 2013, he signed with UES. During his time in UES, Carranza had become team captain due to contributing in important moments during his time for the club. However, during those years, UES was in administration which cause the club to suffer arrears in salary payments, and coupled with Carranza losing presence in his matches, he finally left the team in 2016.

=== C.D. Aspirante ===
After leaving the UES, Carranza had a very short stint with Aspirante.

=== C.D. Dragón ===
Carranza signed with C.D. Dragón for the Clausura 2017 tournament. The team of San Miguel also suffered many administrative, economic and sports problems. Carranza ended up leaving the team months later.

== International career ==
Carranza made his debut for El Salvador in an April 2004 friendly match against Colombia and has earned a total of 3 caps, scoring no goals. He has represented his country in only 1 FIFA World Cup qualification match.

His final international game was an August 2004 friendly match against Honduras.
