= Adrián Mahía =

Argentine footballer

Personal information
- Full name: Adrián Andrés Mahía
- Date of birth: 2 December 1967 (age 58)
- Place of birth: San Rafael, Argentina
- Position: Striker

Senior career*
Years	Team	Apps	(Gls)
1991	Belgrano de Córdoba		
1991–1992	Rosario Central	18	(3)
1992–1993	Independiente	11	(0)
1993	Platense	17	(0)
1999–2000	Águila		
- Cruz Azul
- Zacatepec
1995	Toros Neza	12	(0)
1996–1999	Deportivo Saprissa		(47)
2000–2002	Juventud Unida		
- * Club domestic league appearances and goals as of 16 January 2007

Adrián Andrés Mahía Gargantini (born December 2, 1967) is a former Argentine soccer striker, who played professional football in Argentina, Mexico, El Salvador and Costa Rica.

== Career ==
Many of the most important moments of his career came with Deportivo Saprissa of Costa Rica, during the 1990s. With Saprissa, he two national championships, as well as one CONCACAF Champions Cups. He also played with Club Deportivo Águila of El Salvador, Cruz Azul and Toros Neza and Zacatepec of Mexico.

In his native Argentina he played for Belgrano de Córdoba, Club Atlético Platense, Independiente, Rosario Central and Club Atlético Juventud Unida Universitario.

Mahía was a prolific goalscorer who was noted for his heading ability, finishing, and physical strength. He is remembered by Saprissa's fans for consistently giving his all in their matches.

He was the best goal scorer in the 1999 Costa Rica's first division tournament, in which he managed to score 21 goals. Retired from soccer, he now lives in his home country.

== Titles ==
Season	Club	Title
1997–1998	Deportivo Saprissa	Primera División de Costa Rica
1998–1999	Deportivo Saprissa	Primera División de Costa Rica
2000	Club Deportivo Águila	Salvadoran Primera División
