= Sergio Bufarini =

Argentine footballer (born 1963)

Personal information
- Full name: Sergio Antonio Bufarini
- Date of birth: September 20, 1963 (age 63)
- Place of birth: Argentina
- Position: Forward

Senior career*
Years	Team	Apps	(Gls)
- Deportivo Armenio
1985–1986	Platense	23	(4)
1986–1987	Temperley		
1984	Independiente		
- Instituto
1993–1994	Talleres		(3)
- General Pico
1995–1996	Huachipato		
1997	León de Huánuco		
- Comunicaciones
1993–94	Alianza		

International career
1984	Argentina U23		
- * Club domestic league appearances and goals

Sergio Antonio Bufarini (born 20 September 1963 in Buenos Aires, Argentina) is a former Argentine football (soccer) player, who played forward.
