= Santos Rivera =

Salvadoran footballer (born 1974)

Santos Noel Rivera
Personal information
- Full name: Santos Noel Rivera Ayala
- Date of birth: April 8, 1974 (age 52)
- Place of birth: San Luis de la Reina, El Salvador
- Height: 1.79 m (5 ft 10 1/2 in)
- Position: Goalkeeper

Youth career
- 1990–1993: CD Santiagueño

Senior career*
Years	Team	Apps	(Gls)
1993–1999	ADET		
1999–2005	CD Municipal Limeño		
2005–2006	→ CD Águila (loan)		
2006–2007	CD FAS		
2007–2009	CD Águila		

International career
1995–2005	El Salvador	22	(0)

Managerial career
- 2010–2011: CD Águila (reserves)
- 2013–2014: CD Dragón (reserves)
- 2015: CD Dragón (interim)
- 2015: CD Dragón (interim)
- 2016: CD Dragón
- 2016–2017: CD Dragón (assistant)
- 2017: CD Dragón (interim)
- 2017–2018: CD Dragón (assistant)
- 2018: CD Dragón
- 2019: CD Águila (reserves)
- 2019: CD Águila (interim)
- * Club domestic league appearances and goals

Santos Noel Rivera Ayala (born April 8, 1974) is a former Salvadoran professional football goalkeeper.

== Club career ==
Rivera started his career at Segunda División club Santiagueño, De Santiago De María Usulután at the age of 15 and moved to Primera División outfit ADET in 1993.

After six years there, he joined Municipal Limeño for another four years, before he finally moved to one of the country's top teams for a short spell at Águila.

He returned to Águila after another short stint at FAS. He did not win a league title during his playing career and retired from the game in 2009 to become goalkeeper coach of Águila.

Noel Rivera played several finals of the Primera División during his career: Apertura 1999 and Apertura 2000 with Municipal Limeño, also Clausura 2006 and Apertura 2006 with FAS but he could never be crowned champion because all the finals were lost.

== International career ==
Nicknamed el Negro, Rivera made his debut for El Salvador in a November 1995 friendly match against Yugoslavia when he came on as a substitute for Raúl García.

He has earned a total of 22 caps, scoring no goals. He has represented his country in 7 FIFA World Cup qualification matches and played at the 2005 UNCAF Nations Cup, as well as at the 1998 CONCACAF Gold Cup and 2002 CONCACAF Gold Cups.

His final international game was a February 2005 UNCAF Nations Cup match against Costa Rica.

== Managerial career ==
In May 2010, Rivera left his position of goalkeeper coach of Águila to become coach of the Águila reserves but in summer 2011, he was dismissed despite his contract running until 2015.

In October 2011, he was named as successor to Luis Ramírez Zapata at the Department of Culture and Sports of the San Miguel mayorship.

During some time, Noel Rivera became presenter of the sports program "Palco Deportivo" of Canal 33.

Since 2013, Noel Rivera has had participation in the coaching staff of Dragón, being a coach, technical assistant and interim coach on more than one occasion with the team of San Miguel. In 2018, he re-signed as team coach in substitution of Rubén da Silva, with Dragón playing in Segunda División.

== Honours ==
=== Player ===
==== Club ====
C.D. Municipal Limeño

- Primera División
  - Runners-up: Apertura 1999, Apertura 2000

C.D. FAS

- Primera División
  - Runners-up: Clausura 2006, Apertura 2006
