= Deris Umanzor =

Salvadoran footballer (born 1980)

Personal information
- Full name: Deris Ariel Umanzor Guevara
- Date of birth: 7 January 1980 (age 46)
- Place of birth: Santa Rosa de Lima, El Salvador
- Height: 5 ft 7 in (1.70 m)
- Position: Defender

Youth career
- 1994–1998: Municipal Limeño

Senior career*
Years	Team	Apps	(Gls)
1998–2004	Municipal Limeño	193	(26)
2005–2010	Águila	260	(10)
2010	Chicago Fire	10	(0)
2011–2017	Águila	169	(10)

International career
2000–2011	El Salvador	44	(2)
- * Club domestic league appearances and goals

Deris Ariel Umanzor Guevara (born 7 January 1980) is a Salvadoran former professional footballer who played as a defender.

== Club career ==
Deris Umanzor began his career in the youth system of Municipal Limeño and eventually moved up to the first team in 1998.

After six seasons with Municipal Limeño, Umanzor moved to top Salvadoran side Águila in 2005. Umanzor has been one of the top left backs in the Salvadoran Primera División.

On 8 April 2010, he was acquired by MLS club Chicago Fire.

Umanzor and Chicago Fire mutually agreed to terminate his contract on 9 February 2011, making him a free agent.

In May 2011 it was announced he would return to Águila after the 2011 CONCACAF Gold Cup.

Umanzor finished his career with the second most games in the primera division with 622 games, 429 games and 20 goals with Aguila, and 193 games and 26 goals with Municipal Limeño

After being released By Aguila at the end 2017, In January 2018, Deris Umanzor announced his retirement from football.

== International career ==
Umanzor made his debut for El Salvador in an October 2000 FIFA World Cup qualification match against Saint Vincent and the Grenadines and has, as of February 2012, earned a total of 44 caps, scoring 2 goals.

He has represented his country in 9 FIFA World Cup qualification matches and played at the 2001, 2005 and 2011 UNCAF Nations Cups as well as at the 2002 and 2009 CONCACAF Gold Cups and was a non-playing squad member at the 2011 CONCACAF Gold Cup.

== Career statistics ==
#	Date	Venue	Opponent	Score	Result	Competition
1.	27 May 2001	Estadio Olímpico Metropolitano, San Pedro Sula, Honduras	Honduras	1–1	1–1	2001 UNCAF Nations Cup
2.	16 January 2011	Estadio Rommel Fernández, Panama City, Panama	Belize	5–2	5–2	2011 Copa Centroamericana
