= Santa Rosa de Lima, El Salvador =

Santa Rosa de Lima
- District
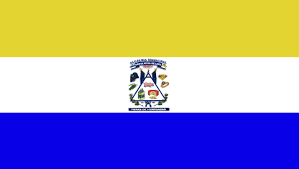
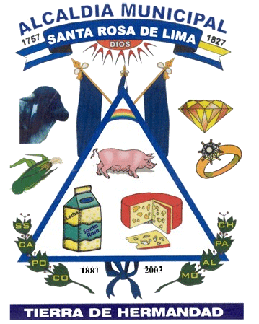
- Flag Seal

- Location in El Salvador
- Coordinates: 13°37′N 87°54′W
- Country: El Salvador
- Department: La Unión Department
- Elevation: 348 ft (106 m)

Population (2020)
  - District: 34,279
  - Urban: 13,249

Santa Rosa de Lima is a district in La Unión Department of El Salvador.

The city is named after St. Rose of Lima, born on 1586 in Lima (Peru). Its "fiestas patronales" are during the month of August, when the city gets full of vendors from around the country selling a wide range of articles and food.

== Economy ==
The city is also known as the "capital of commerce" in La Unión and is famous for its cheese, gold and livestock trade. And they have a big commerce of cows, pigs and clothing. Santa Rosa de Lima is a city which is the heart of commerce. The city has many fast food places and traditional also like the famous pupusas. The city is located a few kilometers from the Honduras border. During the Honduras/El Salvador war in the late 60's, the city got hundreds of expatriated Salvadorans from Honduras. At which time, there ensued an economic depression that lasted just before the eruption of the civil war in 1979.

== Geography ==
The city is located between the Pacific Ocean plains and the northern mountains of the country. It is situated on a sloppy area south of the San Sebastian Peak, known for its gold ores. There is a small river that meanders through the city. This river is contaminated with oxides from the ex gold mine up north, trash and sewage from the city. The stream is mostly dry during summer but it swells through the winter. 30 kilometers to the west of the city lies the larger city of San Miguel, third largest city of the country and 50 kilometers to the south lies the port city of La Union.

== Sport ==
The local professional football club is named C.D. Municipal Limeño and it currently plays in the Primera División de Fútbol de El Salvador.
