= Garcis =

Mexican sports equipment company

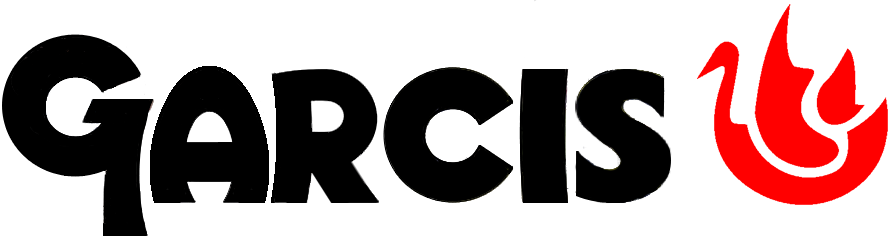
- Industry: Sports equipment
- Founded: 1961; 65 years ago
- Headquarters: Leon, Guanajuato, Mexico
- Products: sportswear, apparel
- Website: https://garcis.com/

Garcis is a Mexican sportswear company headquartered in Leon, Guanajuato, Mexico. It was started in Mexico City in 1961 by David García.

== History ==
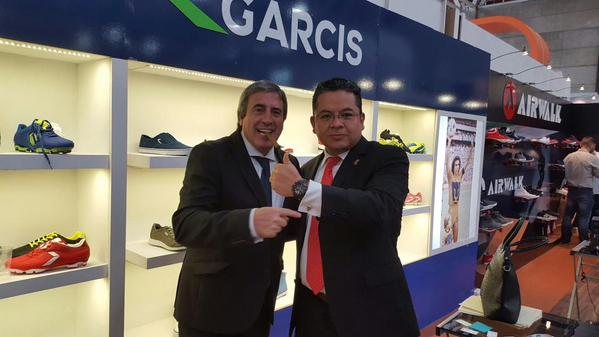
A Garcis stand at the Salón Internacional de Piel y Calzado in 2015

The first production plant was created in Colonia Moctezuma in Mexico City. This plant was mainly producing shirts and it wouldn't be until the construction of another camp in León, Guanajuato that it would also produce footballs and football shoes.

The company initially supplied apparel for amateurs teams and eventually started sponsoring teams in the First Division football league. The first club to wear Garcis apparel was Pumas UNAM in the 1980s, later it also sponsored Club Deportivo Guadalajara and Tigres UANL. The company's longest sponsor was Atlante FC which it sponsored from 1987 to 2008 and again in 2012. From 1999 to 2000, the company became the official supplier for the Mexico national football team.
