= Mauro Nunes =

Brazilian footballer

Personal information
- Full name: Mauro Cesar Nunes Bastos
- Date of birth: 9 January 1968 (age 58)
- Place of birth: Porto Lucena, Brazil
- Height: 1.73 m (5 ft 8 in)
- Position: Striker

Senior career*
Years	Team	Apps	(Gls)
1989	Juventude		
1990–1991	Atlético Goianiense		
1992	Vitória		
1993–1994	Pelotas		
1995–1998	Esportivo		
1999–2000	Grêmio Santanense	48	(18)
2001–2003	Águila		(57)
- * Club domestic league appearances and goals

Mauro Cesar Nunes Bastos (born 6 January 1968) is a Brazilian former professional footballer.
