= Agustín Castillo =

Peruvian footballer and manager (born 1963)

Personal information
- Full name: Alberto Agustín Castillo Gallardo
- Date of birth: May 5, 1963 (age 63)
- Place of birth: Ica, Peru
- Position: Midfielder

Team information
- Current team: Platense (Manager)

Senior career*
Years	Team	Apps	(Gls)
1973–1974	Alianza Lima		
1975–1977	Porvenir Miraflores		
1978–1982	Club Atlético Chalaco		
1982–1986	Deportivo Municipal		
1987–1988	Deportivo La Joya		
1988–1989	Deportivo AELU		
1989–1990	Deportivo Cuenca		
1990–1993	Atlético Marte		
1993–1994	Herediano		
1994–1996	Aguila		
1996–1997	FAS		

International career
1980–1988	Peru		

Managerial career
- 1997–1999: Deportivo Municipal
- 2000: Municipal Limeño
- 2001–2005: FAS
- 2005–2007: Chalatenango
- 2007–2008: Águila
- 2009: LA Firpo
- 2010: CD Suchitepéquez
- 2011: FAS
- 2011: Sport Boys
- 2012–2013: El Salvador
- 2014: Unión Comercio
- 2014–2015: FAS
- 2016–2017: Sonsonate FC
- 2017–2018: Suchitepéquez
- 2018: Isidro Metapán
- 2020: Llacuabamba
- 2021-2022: Águila
- 2023-2024: Jocoro
- 2024-2025: CD FAS
- 2025-Present: Platense
- * Club domestic league appearances and goals

Alberto Agustín Castillo Gallardo (born May 5, 1963) is a former Peruvian professional footballer and currently the manager of Platense.

== Playing career ==
=== Alianza Lima ===
He started his career with Alianza Lima in 1973. He was part of the squad that won the 1975 tournament. He played in the Peruvian Segunda División until 1978, when he moved to Club Atlético Chalaco.

=== Deportivo Cuenca ===
In 1989, he traveled to Ecuador to play with Deportivo Cuenca.

=== Atlético Marte ===
In 1990, Castillo joined Atlético Marte of El Salvador, he then moved to Costa Rica to play with Herediano.

=== Águila ===
In 1994, he returned to El Salvador to play with Águila.

=== FAS ===
In 1996, he signed with FAS, where he retired.

== Coaching career ==
=== Deportivo Municipal ===
In 1997, he began his coaching career with Deportivo Municipal in his native country of Peru.

=== Municipal Limeño ===
In August 2000, Castillo signed as new coach of Municipal Limeño of El Salvador, replacing Rubén Alonso.

Castillo led them to the Apertura 2000 final, but they were defeated by Águila (2–3).

=== FAS ===
Most of his success was when he became the manager of FAS in July 2001, replacing Rubén Guevara. Castillo led them to win the Clausura 2002, Apertura 2002, Apertura 2003, Apertura 2004 and Clausura 2005. Also, FAS lost the Clausura 2004 final against Alianza on penalties.

In October 2005, Castillo was replaced by Carlos de los Cobos.

=== Chalatenango ===
In September 2005, Castillo signed as new coach of Chalatenango, replacing Carlos Alberto Mijangos. Castillo was replaced by Vladan Vićević in 2007.

=== Águila ===
In December 2007, he signed as coach of Águila, replacing Luis Ramírez Zapata. In December 2008, Castillo was replaced by Pablo Centrone.

=== Luis Ángel Firpo ===
In December 2008, he signed as coach of Luis Ángel Firpo, replacing Óscar Emigdio Benítez. Castillo led them to the Clausura 2009 final, but they were defeated by Isidro Metapán (0–1).

In December 2009, Castillo was replaced by Hugo Coria.

=== Suchitepéquez ===
He then accepted to coach Suchitepéquez of Guatemala, and helped the small club reach the semi-finals of the Clausura 2010.

=== Return to FAS ===
In January 2011, Castillo signed again as coach FAS, replacing Jorge Abrego. Castillo led them to the Clausura 2011 final, which they lost against Alianza (1–2 defeat). At the end of the tournament, he returned to Peru to coach Sport Boys.

=== El Salvador ===
On December 17, 2012, he was announced as new manager to El Salvador, replacing Juan de Dios Castillo. On December 20, 2013, he was sacked as manager of El Salvador.

=== Second return to FAS ===
In September 2014, Castillo signed as coach of FAS, replacing Efraín Burgos. Castillo led them to the Apertura 2015 final, but they were defeated by Alianza (0–1 defeat). In December 2015, Castillo was replaced by Carlos "Ché" Martínez.

=== Sonsonate ===
In May 2016, Castillo signed as new coach of Sonsonate for the Apertura 2016, replacing Ennio Mendoza and Mario Elias Guevara. Castillo led them to the semi-finals of that tournament, but they were defeated by Alianza 0–4 on aggregate.

He left the club in February 2017.

=== Return to Suchitepéquez ===
In December 2017, Castillo signed again as coach of Suchitepéquez.

=== Isidro Metapán ===
In March 2018, Castillo signed as new coach of Isidro Metapán, replacing Edwin Portillo. In December 2018, Isidro Metapán reached the quarter-finals of the Apertura 2018, but they were defeated by FAS 0–2 on aggregate. On 12 December 2018, Castillo left the club.

=== Platense ===
On 9 June, 2025 Castillo was announced as new head coach of Platense. He helped steer the club away from relegation and finished in eighth position, losing to eventual champion LA Firpo 6-2 on aggregate. the enxt season he would help the club stay in the first division, and finished in ninth position just missing out on finals. On 27th of April, 2026 Castillo was given a six month suspension following aggression against referee Raúl Fermín Morales during a Copa presidente match against Fuerte San Francisco.

== Honours ==
=== As a Player ===
==== Club ====
Alianza Lima

- Peruvian Primera División
  - Champion (1):1975

=== Manager ===
==== Club ====
Municipal Limeño

- Primera División
  - Runners-up (1): Apertura 2000

FAS

- Primera División
  - Champion (5): Clausura 2002, Apertura 2002, Apertura 2003, Apertura 2004, Clausura 2005
  - Runners-up (4): Clausura 2004, Clausura 2011, Apertura 2015, Apertura 2024

C.D. Luis Ángel Firpo

- Primera División
  - Runners-up (1): Clausura 2009

Aguila

- Primera División
  - Runners-up (1): Clausura 2022

Jocoro

- Primera División
  - Runners-up (1): Apertura 2023
