= Rudis Corrales =

Salvadoran footballer (born 1979)

Personal information
- Full name: Rudis Alberto Corrales Rivera
- Date of birth: November 6, 1979 (age 47)
- Place of birth: Sociedad, El Salvador
- Height: 1.67 m (5 ft 6 in)
- Position: Forward

Youth career
- 1986–1997: Municipal Limeño

Senior career*
Years	Team	Apps	(Gls)
1997–2003	Municipal Limeño		(77)
2004–2010	Águila		(50)
2011	Alianza (SLV)	11	(4)
2012–2013	Dragón	9	(0)
2013–2014	Aguiluchos USA		

International career^{‡}
1999	El Salvador U-20		
1998–2001	El Salvador U-23		
2001–2010	El Salvador	78	(17)
- * Club domestic league appearances and goals as of April 21, 2011 ‡ National team caps and goals as of August 7, 2011

Rudis Alberto Corrales Rivera (born November 6, 1979) is a retired Salvadoran footballer.

== Club career ==
Corrales' professional career began in 1997, when he signed a contract with Municipal Limeño. He officially made his debut that same year on November 29, in a league match against Dragón.

On September 9, 2007 in a league match against Alianza F.C. Corrales became only the seventh person is Salvadoran league history to score 100 goals, a feat which has only been matched by Salvadoran greats Raúl Díaz Arce, Williams Reyes, Emiliano Pedrozo, Adonai Martínez, Hugo Coria and David Arnoldo Cabrera.

On December 19, 2010, it was announced that he had signed a two-year contract with Alianza. In January 2012, Corrales joined Dragón. In April 2012 he suffered a stroke which partially paralyzed his face.

He played with CD Aguiluchos USA in Oakland, CA. He scored on a free kick in the 90th minute 15.03.14 to win the match a US Open Cup Qualifier.

== International career ==
Corrales made his debut for El Salvador in a May 2001 UNCAF Nations Cup match against Nicaragua and has, as of December 2010, earned a total of 71 caps, scoring 16 goals. He represented his country in 20 FIFA World Cup qualification matches and played at the 2001, 2003, 2005 and 2009 UNCAF Nations Cups as well as at the 2002, 2003 and 2009 CONCACAF Gold Cups.

On February 6, 2008 in a FIFA World Cup qualification match against Anguilla, Corrales became the first player in Salvadoran history to score five goals in a World Cup qualifier. The previous record was held by legendary Salvadoran striker Raúl Díaz Arce, who had scored four goals against Saint Vincent and the Grenadines in the 2002 World Cup qualifiers. He scored his most memorable goal in a FIFA World Cup qualification match against Costa Rica on September 9, 2009. Scoring a goal at the 90th minute that gave life back to El Salvador in this Qualification Stage.

== Career statistics ==
=== International ===
Appearances and goals by national team and year
National team	Year	Apps	Goals
El Salvador	2001	7	1
El Salvador	2002	4	0
El Salvador	2003	12	3
El Salvador	2004	6	0
El Salvador	2005	2	0
El Salvador	2008	17	9
El Salvador	2009	20	2
El Salvador	2010	4	1
El Salvador	2011	6	1
Total		78	17

Scores and results list El Salvador's goal tally first, score column indicates score after each Corrales goal.

List of international goals scored by Rudis Corrales
No.	Date	Venue	Opponent	Score	Result	Competition	Ref.
1	25 May 2001	Estadio Nacional Chelato Uclés, Tegucigalpa, Honduras	Panama	1–0	2–1	2001 UNCAF Nations Cup	
2	9 February 2003	Estadio Rommel Fernández, Panama City, Panama	Panama	2–1	2–1	2003 UNCAF Nations Cup	
3	13 March 2003	Estadio Rommel Fernández, Panama City, Panama	Nicaragua	1–0	3–0	2003 UNCAF Nations Cup	
4	6 July 2003	Home Depot Center, Carson, United States	Mexico	2–0	2–1	Friendly	
5	6 February 2008	Estadio Cuscatlán, San Salvador, El Salvador	Anguilla	3–0	12–0	2010 FIFA World Cup qualification	
6	6 February 2008	Estadio Cuscatlán, San Salvador, El Salvador	Anguilla	4–0	12–0	2010 FIFA World Cup qualification	
7	6 February 2008	Estadio Cuscatlán, San Salvador, El Salvador	Anguilla	6–0	12–0	2010 FIFA World Cup qualification	
8	6 February 2008	Estadio Cuscatlán, San Salvador, El Salvador	Anguilla	7–0	12–0	2010 FIFA World Cup qualification	
9	6 February 2008	Estadio Cuscatlán, San Salvador, El Salvador	Anguilla	8–0	12–0	2010 FIFA World Cup qualification	
10	26 March 2008	Robert F. Kennedy Memorial Stadium, Washington D.C., United States	Anguilla	2–0	4–0	2010 FIFA World Cup qualification	
11	23 April 2008	Los Angeles Memorial Coliseum, Los Angeles, United States	China	1–0	2–2	Friendly	
12	23 April 2008	Los Angeles Memorial Coliseum, Los Angeles, United States	China	2–0	2–2	Friendly	
13	19 November 2008	Los Angeles Memorial Coliseum	Costa Rica	1–0x	1–3	2010 FIFA World Cup qualification	
14	27 May 2009	Los Angeles Memorial Coliseum	Ecuador	2–1	3–1	2010 FIFA World Cup qualification	
15	9 September 2009	Estadio Cuscatlán, San Salvador, El Salvador	Costa Rica	1–0	1–0	2010 FIFA World Cup qualification	
16	24 February 2010	Raymond James Stadium, Tampa, United States	United States	1–0	1–2	Friendly	
17	29 May 2011	Robertson Stadium, Houston, United States	Honduras	2–2	2–2	Friendly	
