= Juventud Olímpica Metalio =

Association football club in El Salvador

Juventud Olímpica Metalio FC
- Full name: Juventud Olímpica Metalio Futbol Clube
- Nickname: Metalio
- Manager: TBD
- League: ADFAS
- TBD: TBD
Home colours

Juventud Olímpica Metalio Futbol Clube are a Salvadoran professional football club based in Sonsonate, El Salvador.

The club currently plays in the ADFAS.

== Honours ==
=== Domestic honours ===
- Segunda División Salvadorean and predecessors
- Champions (1) : 1999
  - Promotion champion up (2): 1999
- Tercera División Salvadorean and predecessors
  - Champions:(1) : 1987
- ADFAS and predecessors
  - Champions - Sonsonate Department (1) : 1985

== Coaches ==
- (Guatemala) Walter Cifuentes
- (El Salvador) Genaro Sermeño
- (El Salvador) Luis Ángel León

== Notable players ==
- (El Salvador) Héctor Ávalos
- (El Salvador) Rodrigo Osorio
- (Honduras) Martín Garcia

== Externals Links ==
- https://historico.elsalvador.com/historico/734229/el-futbol-salvadoreno-esta-de-luto-murio-federico-martinez.html
- https://www.elsalvador.com/h-deportes/h-futbol/mayores-goleadas-historia-torneos-cortos-primera-division-lmf-limeno-aguila-fas/1233560/2025/
