= Adonai Martínez =

Salvadoran footballer (born 1975)

Personal information
- Full name: Adonai Ulises Martínez Bonilla
- Date of birth: October 3, 1975 (age 51)
- Place of birth: San Salvador, El Salvador
- Height: 1.73 m (5 ft 8 in)
- Position: Midfielder

Youth career
- 1992–1994: Alianza FC

Senior career*
Years	Team	Apps	(Gls)
1994–2003	Alianza FC		
2003	CD Chalatenango		
2004–2006	CD Luis Ángel Firpo		
2006	AD Isidro Metapán		
2007	San Salvador FC		
2007–2009	Once Municipal		
2009–2010	Fuerte Aguilares		

International career
1996	El Salvador U23		
1999–2004	El Salvador	21	(0)

Managerial career
- 2015: Alianza FC (assistant)
- 2015–2017: Alianza FC (youth)
- 2017–2019: Alianza FC (assistant)
- 2018–2020: Alianza FC (assistant)
- 2018–2020: Alianza FC (reserve)
- TBD–2022: Alianza FC
- 2024: Independiente
- 2025–: Municipal Limeño (assistant)
- * Club domestic league appearances and goals

Adonai Ulises Martínez Bonilla (born October 3, 1975) is a Salvadoran professional football manager and former player.

== Club career ==
Martínez started his professional career at Alianza with whom he won two league titles including the 2001 Apertura after scoring one of the goals in the 2–1 final win against Luis Ángel Firpo. In 2003, he had a short spell at Chalatenango before joining Luis Ángel Firpo. He then moved to Isidro Metapán and San Salvador before another two years at Once Municipal.

On March 31, 2006, he scored his 100th goal in the Primera División de Fútbol de El Salvador after scoring two goals against Águila.

== International career ==
Martínez made his debut for El Salvador in a March 1999 UNCAF Nations Cup match against Guatemala and has earned a total of 21 caps, scoring no goals. He has represented his country in five FIFA World Cup qualification matches and played at the 1999 UNCAF Nations Cup as well as at the 2002 CONCACAF Gold Cup.

His final international game was a March 2004 friendly match, also against Guatemala.

== Personal life ==
Martínez became father of his first child at the young age of 19.

== Honours ==
- Primera División de Fútbol de El Salvador: 2

1996/1997, Apertura 2001
