= Estadio José Ramón Flores =

Coordinates: 13°37′56″N 87°53′25″W

- Interactive map of Estadio José Ramón Flores
- Location: Santa Rosa de Lima, El Salvador
- Capacity: Soccer: 5,000
- Surface: Grass

Tenant
- C.D. Municipal Limeño

Estadio José Ramón Flores is a multi-use sports complex located in Santa Rosa de Lima, El Salvador. The sports complex is mainly used for its soccer facility. The soccer field is the home field of C.D. Municipal Limeño, a first division soccer team with a capacity of 5,000.

It is named after Doctor José Ramón Flores Berrios —A Santa Rosa de Lima native—, who was the president of FESFUT from 1985 to 1989.

On 29 October 2018 it was announced that the stadium will have four giant floodlights installed, the job was completed in time for the 2021 Apertura season.
