= Juan Ramón Paredes =

Salvadoran footballer and manager (born 1950)

Personal information
- Full name: Juan Ramón Paredes Zelaya
- Date of birth: 23 May 1950 (age 76)
- Place of birth: Santa Tecla, El Salvador
- Height: 1.79 m (5 ft 10 in)

Senior career*
Years	Team	Apps	(Gls)
- Lincoln
- Rácing Jr.
- El Salvador de San Francisco
1980–1984	Salvadoreño		
1985–1986	New York Eagles		

Managerial career
- 1983-1984: ADET (Assistant)
- 1985-1986: El Salvador Olympic (Assistant)
- 1986-1987: ADET (Assistant)
- 1986–1987: Apopa
- 1987–1989: UES
- 1989-1991: Atlético Marte (Assistant)
- 1992: Atlético Marte
- 1995: Águila
- 1996–1997: Dragón
- 1999: Águila
- 2000: FAS
- 2001-2002: Alianza
- 2002–2003: El Salvador Olympic
- 2002–2004: El Salvador
- 2004: San Salvador
- 2005–2006: Independiente Nacional 1906
- 2008: Once Municipal
- 2008–2009: Águila San Isidro
- 2009: Fuerte Aguilares
- 2010: Municipal Limeño
- 2010–2011: Atlético Marte
- 2012: Alianza
- 2014–2015: Atlético Marte (assistant)
- 2015–2016: Marte Soyapango
- 2016: San Rafael Cedros
- 2017: Platense
- 2018: El Roble
- 2018: Brujos de Izalco
- 2018: Sonsonate (technical advisor)
- 2021: AD Destroyer
- 2023: Cangrejera FC
- ????: Quequeisque
- * Club domestic league appearances and goals

Juan Ramón Paredes Zelaya (born 23 May 1950) is a Salvadoran former professional football player and coach, who last managed of Cangrejera FC of the Tercera Division.

== Coaching career ==
=== Alianza ===
Paredes became the coach of Alianza at the beginning of the 2000 season. He went on to win the Apertura 2001; in the process, Paredes became the first (and, so far, only) Salvadoran to win a title with Alianza as coach. He took the team to several final series before quitting the club to become coach of the El Salvador national team.

Paredes led the El Salvador team to the Central American and Caribbean titles in 2002.

He quit as manager of Independiente Nacional 1906 in September 2006.

=== Once Municipal ===
Paredes was signed as coach of Once Municipal on 10 March 2008 after the shock resignation of Hugo Coria. He could not reverse the terrible form slump of Once Municipal after eight matches in charge with three draws and five losses to show for it (including a 5–2 defeat against Isidro Metapán). Paredes resigned as coach on 27 April.

=== Other coaching duties ===
In October 2009 Paredes replaced Victor Girón at Fuerte Aguilares and in May 2010 Paredes signed up with fellow Second division side Municipal Limeño for the remainder of the 2010 Clausura season. In October 2010 he joined Atlético Marte, replacing Luis Guevara Mora who was moved upstairs to become Director of Sports.

=== Alianza ===
Paredes was given again coaching duties in Alianza after the team lost the clásico against Águila at home. Paredes replaced interim coach Cárcamo Batres.

== Honours ==
Atletico Marte]]

- CONCACAF Cup Winners Cup: 1991

Alianza F.C.

- Salvadoran Primera División: Apertura 2001

AD Destroyer

- Segunda División de Fútbol Salvadoreño: Clausura 2021

El Salvador

- Central American and Caribbean Games gold medal: 2002
