= C.D. Municipal Limeño =

Association football club in El Salvador

Municipal Limeño
- Full name: Club Deportivo Municipal Limeño
- Nicknames: Los Chancheros; Santarroseños; Cucheros
- Founded: 11 September 1949
- Ground: Estadio Jose Ramon Flores, Santa Rosa de Lima
- Chairman: (El Salvador) Eduardo Chavez
- Manager: (El Salvador) Jorge Rodriguez
- League: (El Salvador) Primera División
- 2020 Apertura: Overall: 5th Playoffs: Quarterfinal
| Home colours | Away colours |

Club Deportivo Municipal Limeño is a professional Salvadoran football club based in Santa Rosa de Lima, La Unión, El Salvador. Their home stadium is Estadio Jose Ramon Flores, with a capacity of 5,000.

Limeño has won five Segunda División titles and has been Primera División runner-up three times.

== History ==
The club was founded on 11 September 1949 and started and continues to be based in the town of Santa Rosa de Lima in the department of La Union. The club began playing in the second division and spent almost twenty years there until in 1971 Municipal Limeño got promoted to the top flight at the expense of UCA.

=== First tenure in the first division (1972–1975) ===
Municipal Limeño campaign of the 1972 season was exceptional one for a newly promoted team with them coming in sixth place with sixteen points their team was led strongly by the Guatemalan Tomas Gambo, who scored five goals (the team leading goalscorer) and enabled the club to qualify to the semi-final group. However their experience was an unhappy one with the team losing all their games and bowing out of championship contention. Limeño 1973 and 1974 season were unhappy campaign with the team struggling and finishing in the relegation group, however both time the team managed to survive relegation at the expense of Excelsior and Sonsonate. But after several near relegation, Municipal Limeño finally were relegated in the 1975 season after only earning 16 points from 33 games. The club were forced to play a promotion-relegation battle against Once Municipal in which the team lost and were relegated to the second division along with Juventud Olímpico.

=== Second tenure in the first division (1993–2005) ===
It would not be until 1993, 18 years after getting relegated, that they would make a return to the first division. During their second tenure (1993–2005) in the first division they reached the semi-finals six times, including reaching the grand final twice (Apertura 1999 and Apertura 2000) under the coaching off Óscar Emigdio Benítez and Agustin Castillo, however both time the club lost in the grand final against Águila. The club finished 9th in the aggregate table, they were relegated after a promotion-relegation two legged series on away goals after a 1-1.

=== Third tenure in the first division (2009–2010) ===
On 26 June 2009, Chalatenango going through financial troubles, sold their spot in the top flight Primera División to side Limeño. This resulted Municipal Limeño's return to the First Division after a four-year hiatus. However their campaign was an unhappy one with them finishing second last and forcing them to play a promotion/relegation match against Once Municipal which they lost and were relegated to the Second Division and that's where the club has remained ever since.

=== Recent events ===
The club spent the next few seasons trying to regain promotion to the First Division, they made several second division semi-finals and grand finals but always falling short, however the club finally succeeded when they won the Apertura 2015 title defeating Fuerte San Francisco, then winning the Clausura 2016 title defeating Atlético Comalapa of Chalatenango 5–4 in penalties, after tying on aggregate 3–3, the club were promoted back to the Primera Division.

Municipal Limeno confirmed a fourth relegation from the Primera division on 2 May 2022 despite a 1–0 victory over Isidro Metapan at Jose Romero Berios. Limeno's run in the Primera División from 2016 to 2022 was a mix of little to moderate success, with the biggest success of the club was reaching CONCACAF League the first international tournament for the club and Being the club Nicolas Munoz scored his 303-goal making him the highest scorer in Central American league history.

After spending one year in the Segunda division, on 26 June 2023, Municipal Limeno returned to the Primera division after acquiring the spot of Historic team Atletico Marte. The club announced Honduran Jorge Pineda as head coach of the team and will be accompanied by compatriot German Rodriguez as assistant coach.

The club reached its first grand final in 24 years, after defeating Isidro Metapan and Platense, However the club experience was humiliating one, losing 5-0 against Alianza, with Emerson Mauricio scoring four goals (a record in a final) and Honduran Ever Alvarado being sent off on 21st minute, Limeno played the rest of the game with 10 men.

In the 2025 Clausura season, The club finished fifth, the club defeated Isidro Metapan and FAS in the quarter-final and Semi-final respectively, and they advanced to the 2025 Clausura final for the second time in two years However, they were one again defeated by Alianza at the Estadio Jorge "El Mágico" González, this time losing 4-3 on penalties after the match ended 0-0.

== Stadium ==
Municipal Limeño plays their home matches on the Estadio Jose Ramon Flores in the suburb of Santa Rosa de Lima in La Union. The Estadio Jose Ramon Flores has been Municipal Limeño's home stadium since its creation 1963.

=== Home stadiums ===
- Estadio Jose Ramon Flores; Santa Rosa de Lima (1963–present)
- Estadio Cuscatlán; San Salvador (2018, 2020)

== Rivalries ==
Municipal Limeño have rivalries with several clubs, including local rivalries with Atlético Balboa. A rivalry with Águila was created when Águila and Limeño, faced each other twice in grand finals (Both falling in the way of Águila). When former Limeño player Rudis Corrales moved to Águila, it caused uproar with Águila supporters.

Limeno has supported a long rivalry with Pasaquina for geographical reasons, since both are from the province of La Union; this clash is called the "Derby Unionense."

== Sponsors ==
- (El Salvador) Arijam Sports
- (El Salvador) TBD
- (El Salvador) Universidad Dr. Andres Bello
- (United States) PROHVAC Solutions
- (El Salvador) SEVISAL SA
- (El Salvador) Parque Jardin Memorial Monte Calvaro
- GeniusBet El Salvador
- (Mexico) Electrolit

Limeno's shirts have previously been sponsored by Tapachulteca (1988–1999), TACA (1992), Pepsi (1999), Diana (2007–2013), Pilsener (2007–2013), Burger King (2013) and Tigo (2009). Their kits have been manufactured by Tony Sports (since July 2024) . Prior manufacturers have been Galaxia (1999–2007, 2018), TBD (TBD) and JAG SportsWear (2024), Aviva (TBD)

| Period | Company |
|---|---|
| 1993 | (El Salvador) Cristian Deportes |
| 1999 | (Mexico) Garcis |
| 2000 | (El Salvador) AVIVA |
| 2001-2002 | (El Salvador) Galaxia |
| 2005 | (El Salvador) AVIVA |
| 2015 | (El Salvador) None |
| 2018 | (El Salvador) TBD |
| 2020-2022 | (Mexico) Innova Sport |
| 2023 | (El Salvador) Tony Sports |
| 2024 | (Mexico) JAG SportsWear |
| 2024–2025 | (El Salvador) Tony Sports |
| 2026–present | (El Salvador) Arijam Sports |

As of May 2025

| Period | Kit Manufacturer | Shirt Sponsor | Sleeve Sponsor |
|---|---|---|---|
| 2026–present | Arijam Sports | Universidad Dr. Andres Bello, Parque Jardin Memorial Monte Calvaro, GeniusBet El Salvador, SEVISAL SA | Electrolit, Canal 4, Indes |

== Honours ==
Municipal Limeño have won Domestic league honours predominately in the lower leagues. The club's last El Salvador honour was in 2016 when they won the Segunda División in 2016.

=== Domestic honours ===
- Primera Division of El Salvador and predecessors
  - Runners-up (4): Apertura 1999, Apertura 2000, Clausura 2024, Clausura 2025
- Segunda División Salvadorean and predecessors
  - Champions: (5): 1971, 1992, 1993, Apertura 2015, Clausura 2016

== Current squad ==
Updated July, 2026. Note: Flags indicate national team as defined under FIFA eligibility rules; some limited exceptions apply. Players may hold more than one non-FIFA nationality.

| No. | Pos. | Nation | Player |
|---|---|---|---|
| 29 | GK | SLV | Rafael Garcia |
| 25 | GK | SLV | Oscar Sanchez |
| 2 | DF | SLV | Fredy Espinoza (captain) |
| 16 | DF | SLV | Jose Martinez |
| 3 | DF | SLV | Elvis Claros |
| 4 | DF | URU | Matias Bentin |
| 5 | DF | SLV | Rodrigo Lopez |
| ? | DF | SLV | William Molina |
| 10 | MF | SLV | Marvin Ramos |
| 24 | MF | SLV | Rudy Ramirez |

| No. | Pos. | Nation | Player |
|---|---|---|---|
| 31 | MF | SLV | Jefferson Martinez |
| 8 | MF | SLV | Gerson Mayen |
| 7 | MF | SLV | Jefferson Valladares |
| 22 | MF | URU | Anyelo Rodriguez |
| 12 | MF | SLV | Enmanuel Hernandez |
| 15 | FW | SLV | Danis Cerros |
| 21 | FW | SLV | Wilma Torres |
| 11 | FW | ARG | Israel Escalante |
| 9 | FW | SLV | Juan Carlos Argueta |
| 30 | FW | SLV | Javier Ferman |

=== Players with Dual citizenship ===
- (El Salvador) (Uruguay) Rafael Garcia
- (El Salvador) (United States) Gerson Mayen

=== In ===
Note: Flags indicate national team as defined under FIFA eligibility rules; some limited exceptions apply. Players may hold more than one non-FIFA nationality.

| No. | Pos. | Nation | Player |
|---|---|---|---|
| — | | SLV | (From TBD) |
| — | | SLV | (From TBD) |
| — | | SLV | (From TBD) |
| — | | SLV | (From TBD) |

| No. | Pos. | Nation | Player |
|---|---|---|---|
| — | | SLV | (From TBD) |
| — | | SLV | (From TBD) |
| — | | SLV | (From TBD) |

=== Out ===
Note: Flags indicate national team as defined under FIFA eligibility rules; some limited exceptions apply. Players may hold more than one non-FIFA nationality.

| No. | Pos. | Nation | Player |
|---|---|---|---|
| — | GK | SLV | Julián Chicas (To TBD) |
| — | | SLV | Javier Bolanos (To TBD) |
| — | FW | COL | José Erick Correa (To TBD) |
| — | | SLV | Jordy Bonilla (To TBD) |

| No. | Pos. | Nation | Player |
|---|---|---|---|
| — | | SLV | (To TBD) |
| — | | SLV | (To TBD) |
| — | | SLV | (To TBD) |
| — | | SLV | (To TBD) |

== Personnel ==
=== Coaching staff ===
As of May 2026

| Position | Staff |
|---|---|
| Manager | (El Salvador) Jorge Rodriguez (*) |
| Assistant Manager | (El Salvador) Adonai Martínez (*) |
| Reserve Manager | (El Salvador) TBD |
| Under 17 Manager | (El Salvador) Saul Prudenció |
| Ladies Manager | (El Salvador) Saul Prudenció (*) |
| Goalkeeper Coach | (El Salvador) Abiel Aguilera (*) |
| Under 15 Manager | (El Salvador) TBD |
| Fitness Coach | (El Salvador) René Ramírez (*) |
| Team Doctor | (El Salvador) TBD |
| Kinesiologist | (El Salvador) TBD |
| Utility | (El Salvador) Manuel Mane Torres |
| Sport Analyst | (El Salvador) Roberto Carlos Vasquez * |
| Sport Director | (El Salvador) Martir Paredes |

== Management ==
As of 1 July 2023

=== Board of directors ===
| Position | Staff |
|---|---|
| Owner | (El Salvador) Soccer Association of Limeño |
| President | (El Salvador) Eduardo Chávez * |
| Vice-president | (El Salvador) Guillermo Escobar (*) |
| Secretary | (El Salvador) Benjamín Lazo |
| Administrative Manager | (El Salvador) Pablo Cruz |
| Representative | (El Salvador) Mártir Herrera |
| Sports Manager | (El Salvador) Alejandro González |
| Club Administrative Manager | (El Salvador) Carlos Cruz |

== Managers ==
Limeno has had TBD managers in the professional era, with the holder of the office changing TBD times. TBD holds the record for the longest-serving manager at the club, both for a single spell (39 months between. 1977–80, 152 matches) and overall (75 months in three spells, 275 matches). Paraguayan Nelson Brizuela holds the record for the most spells at Limeno with three (TBD months overall, TBD matches). Carlos Romero is the only manager to win two trophies with the club.

| Year | Manager |
|---|---|
| 1958–1960 | (El Salvador) Gustavo Molina and Carlos Gudiel |
| 1972 | (Chile) Néstor Valdez Moraga |
| 1972 | (El Salvador) Yohalmo Aurora |
| January–April 1973 | (Argentina) Gregorio Bundio |
| April 1973 | (Argentina) Jose Santacolombo |
| April 1973-1973 | (El Salvador) Ricardo Tomasino |
| February–December 1974 | (El Salvador) Luis "Chispo" Santana |
| January–July 1975 | (El Salvador) Juan Francisco Barraza |
| July 1975 – 1976 | (El Salvador) Luis "Chispo" Santana |
| 1983–1984 | (El Salvador) Salvador Rivas |
| 1984 | (El Salvador) Moises Gonzales |
| 1988 | (El Salvador) Elmer Rodríguez |
| 1992-1993? | (El Salvador) Aquiles Medina |
| 1993–1994 | (Paraguay) Nelson Brizuela |
| 1994–1995 | (El Salvador) Saul Molina |
| January 1995 | (El Salvador) Víctor Manuel Pacheco |
| October–December 1995 | (El Salvador) Saul Molina |
| January 1996 | (El Salvador) Abraham Vasquez (El Penero) |
| February–March 1996 | (Argentina) Juan Quarterone |
| April 1996 | (El Salvador) Victor Coreas (Player/coach) |
| April 1996 – July 1996 | (El Salvador) Alfredo Ruano |
| August–October 1996 | (Brazil) Helio Rodriguez |
| November 1996 – February 1997 | (Costa Rica) Manuel Solano Madrigal |
| February–March 1997 | (El Salvador) Carlos Ventura |
| March–April 1997 | (Colombia) Henry Vanegas |
| April–May 1997 | (Colombia) Cesar Rincon (interim) |
| June 1997 – 1997 | (Honduras) Alfredo Romero (interim) |
| 1997 – July 1998 | (Brazil) Antonio Carlos Vieira |
| July 1998 – January 1999 | (Paraguay) Nelson Brizuela |
| January 1999 – July 1999 | (El Salvador) Víctor Manuel Pacheco |
| July 1999 – December 1999 | (El Salvador) Óscar Emigdio Benítez |
| January 2000 – July 2000 | (Uruguay) Rubén Alonso |
| August 2000 – April 2001 | (Peru) Agustín Castillo |
| April–July 2001 | (Chile) Hernán Vivanco |
| July–December 2001 | (North Macedonia) Kiril Dojčinovski |
| December 2001 – May 2002 | (El Salvador) Óscar Emigdio Benítez |
| May–June 2002 | (El Salvador) Omar Sevilla (interim) |
| June 2002 – April 2003 | (Colombia) Henry Vanegas |
| April–May 2003 | (Brazil) Antonio Carlos Vieira |
| June–September 2003 | (El Salvador) Rubén Guevara |
| October 2003 – June 2004 | (Argentina) Jorge García |
| July–September 2004 | (Uruguay) Ricardo "Tato" Ortíz Ruíz |
| September–December 2004 | (Argentina) Raúl Héctor Cocherari |
| January 2005 – 2006 | (Paraguay) Nelson Brizuela |
| January 2005 – 2006 | (El Salvador) José Ramón Avilés |
| January–May 2006 | (Argentina) Hugo Coria |
| 2006 | (Colombia) Carlos Estrada |
| 2006–2007 | (Paraguay) Nelson Brizuela |

| Year | Manager |
|---|---|
| 2008 – November 2008 | (El Salvador) Mario Martínez |
| December 2008 – June 2009 | (Argentina) Jorge Alberto García |
| June–August 2009 | (El Salvador) Miguel "La Peluda" Aguilar |
| August 2009 – January 2010 | (El Salvador) Víctor Coreas |
| January–May 2010 | (Brazil) Eraldo Correia |
| May–August 2010 | (El Salvador) Juan Ramón Paredes |
| January 2011 – December 2012 | (El Salvador) Carlos Romero |
| January–June 2014 | (El Salvador) Mario Martínez |
| July–September 2014 | (El Salvador) Fidel Antonio Bonilla |
| September 2014 – February 2015 | (El Salvador) Esteban Melara |
| February–June 2015 | (El Salvador) David Ramírez |
| June 2015 – July 2016 | (El Salvador) Carlos Romero |
| July–November 2016 | (El Salvador) Mauricio Alfaro |
| November 2016 – February 2017 | (El Salvador) Francisco Robles |
| February–November 2017 | (Paraguay) Hugo Ovelar |
| December 2017 – March 2018 | (Argentina) Emiliano Barrera |
| March 2018 | (El Salvador) Wilfredo Molina (interim) |
| March–October 2018 | (El Salvador) Víctor Coreas |
| March–December 2018 | (El Salvador) Omar Sevilla |
| December 2018 – November 2019 | (El Salvador) William Renderos Iraheta |
| November–December 2019 | (El Salvador) Manuel Carranza Murillo (interim) |
| December 2019 – October 2020 | (El Salvador) Alvaro Misael Alfaro |
| October 2020 – May 2021 | (El Salvador) Nelson Mauricio Ancheta |
| May – 23 August 2021 | (Mexico) Bruno Martinez |
| 23 August – September 2021 | (El Salvador) Jose Romero (interim) |
| 30 September – 24 November 2021 | (El Salvador) Giovanni Trigueros |
| 24 November – December 2021 | (El Salvador) Jose Romero (interim) |
| December 2021 – May 2022 | (El Salvador) Carlos Romero |
| June–October 2022 | (Honduras) German Alexis Rodríguez |
| October–December 2022 | (El Salvador) Saul Prudenció |
| December 2022 – June 2023 | (El Salvador) Jose Romero |
| June–August 2023 | (Honduras) Jorge Pineda |
| August–October 2023 | (El Salvador) Nelson Ancheta |
| October–December 2023 | (El Salvador) Abel Flores |
| December 2023 – September 2024 | (El Salvador) William Renderos |
| September 2024 – October 2024 | (El Salvador) Abel Flores (Interim) |
| October 2024 – December 2024 | (El Salvador) Guillermo Rivera |
| December 2024 – August 2025 | (El Salvador) Jose Romero |
| August 2025 – September 2025 | (El Salvador) Saul Pruncedio (Interim) |
| September 2025 – Present | (El Salvador) Jorge Rodriguez |

The following managers won at least one trophy when in charge of Municipal Limeno
| Name | Period | Trophies |
| (El Salvador) TBD | 1971 | 1 Segunda División Salvadorean (1971) |
| (Paraguay) Nelson Brizuela | 1993-94, July 1998 – 1998, January 2005 – 2006, 2006–2007 | 1 Segunda División Salvadorean (1992-93) |
| (El Salvador) Carlos Romero | January 2011 – December 2012, June 2015 – July 2016, December 2021 – May 2022 | 2 Segunda División Salvadorean (Apertura 2015, Clausura 2016) |
| (El Salvador) Óscar Emigdio Benítez | August–December 1999, December 2001 – May 2002 | 1 Runner-up in the Apertura 1999 |
| (Peru) Agustín Castillo | August 2000 – April 2001 | 1 Runner-up in the Apertura 2000 |
| (El Salvador) William Renderos | December 2023 – September 2024 | 1 Runner-up in the Clausura 2024 |
| (El Salvador) Jose Romero | December 2024 – August 2025 | 1 Runner-up in the Clausura 2025 |

== League history ==
- 1950s: TBD
- TBD-1971: Segunda Division
- 1971–1975: Salvadoran Primera División
- 1975–1979: Liga de Ascenso
- 1980–1983: Liga B (tercera Division)
- 1983–1992: Liga de Ascenso
- 1993–2005: Salvadoran Primera División

- 2005–2009: Segunda Division
- 2009–2010: Salvadoran Primera División
- 2010–2016: Segunda Division
- 2016–2022: Salvadoran Primera División
- 2023: Segunda Division
- 2023 – present: Salvadoran Primera División

=== Overall seasons table in Primera División de Fútbol Profesional ===
| Pos. | Club | Season In D1 | Pl. | W | D | L | GS | GA | Dif. |
|---|---|---|---|---|---|---|---|---|---|
| TBA | Municipal Limeno | 23 | 880 | 263 | 293 | 324 | 1068 | 1172 | -104 |

Last updated: 11 May 2022

== Players ==
=== Internationals who have played at Limeño ===
Players marked in bold gained their caps while playing at Limeno.

- (Guatemala) Tomás Gamboa
- (El Salvador) **Rudis Corrales**
- (El Salvador) **Deris Umanzor**
- (El Salvador) **Santos Rivera**
- (El Salvador) **Elmer Martínez**
- (El Salvador) **Josue Galdamez**
- (El Salvador) Francisco Osorto
- (Honduras) Julio César de León
- (Honduras) Éver Alvarado
- (Honduras) Geovanny Castro
- (Honduras) Carlos Guity
- (Honduras) German Mejia
- (Honduras) Marvin Sanchez
- (Honduras) Clayvin Zúñiga
- (Mexico) Luis Ángel Landín
- (El Salvador) **Kevin Carabantes**
- (El Salvador) Rudy Valencia
- (El Salvador) Diego Coca
- (El Salvador) Julio Palacios
- (El Salvador) **Magdonio Corrales**
- (Panama) **Franklin Delgado**
- (Panama) Erick Martinez
- (Panama) Nicolás Muñoz
- (El Salvador) **Edwin Gonzalez**
- (El Salvador) Edwin Martinez
- (El Salvador) **Rene Galan**
- (El Salvador) **Marvin Benitez**
- (Peru) Cesar Charun
- (El Salvador) Oris Velasquez
- (El Salvador) Francisco Alvarez
- (El Salvador) **Francisco Fuentes**
- (El Salvador) Selvin Zelaya
- (El Salvador) Yuvini Salamanca
- (El Salvador) Jorge Martinez
- (El Salvador) Daniel Sagistizado
- (El Salvador) Francis Reyes
- (El Salvador) Elias Montes
- (El Salvador) Martin Paredes
- (El Salvador) Isidro Gutierrez
- (El Salvador) **Salvador Coreas**
- (El Salvador) Carlos Menjivar
- (El Salvador) Walter Soto
- (El Salvador) Victor Velasquez
- (El Salvador) Henry Romero
- (El Salvador) Rolando Torres
- (El Salvador) Manfredi Portillo
- (El Salvador) Fabricio Alfaro
- (El Salvador) Rommel Mejia
- (El Salvador) Irvin Valdez
- (El Salvador) Jairo Henriquez
- (El Salvador) Jose Angel Pena
- (El Salvador) Harold Alas
- (El Salvador) Isaac Zelaya
- (El Salvador) Edwin Sanchez
- (El Salvador) Marlon Cornejo
- (El Salvador) Carlos Rivera
- (El Salvador) Victor Coreas
- (El Salvador) Gilberto Ramirez
- (El Salvador) Francisco Osorto
- (El Salvador) **Rómulo Villalobos**
- (El Salvador) Rubén Marroquín
- (El Salvador) Cristian Gil
- (El Salvador) Gilberto Baires
- (El Salvador)

=== Captains ===
- Only captains in competitive matches are included.
- Players marked in **bold** are still playing in the professional team.

| Captain | Nationality | Years | Notes |
|---|---|---|---|
| Jorge Vasquez | El Salvador | 1973 | |
| Julio Cesar Urrutia | El Salvador | 1974 | |
| Victor Yanez | El Salvador | 1975 | |
| Fidel Bonilla | El Salvador | 1984 | |
| Moises Gonzalez | El Salvador | 1988 | |
| Mario Ruiz | El Salvador | 1994 | |
| Omar Sevilla | El Salvador | 1994–1995 | |
| Carlos Rivera | El Salvador | 1996| | |
| Ivan Nolasco | Honduras | 1996 | |
| Omar Sevilla | El Salvador | 1997 | |
| Elmer Martinez | El Salvador | 1999-2001 | |
| Victorino Arcadio Velásquez | El Salvador | 2003 | |
| Jorge Orlando Martinez | El Salvador | 2004 | |
| Víctor Velásquez | El Salvador | 2010 | |
| Pastor Melgar | El Salvador | 2016 | |
| Jefferson Viveros | Colombia | 2016 | |
| Francisco Jovel Álvarez | El Salvador | 2017-2017 | |
| Carlos del Giorno | Argentina | 2017-2017 | |
| Diego Coca | El Salvador | 2018-2018 | |
| Francisco Jovel Álvarez | El Salvador | 2018-2018 | – |
| Mario Machado | El Salvador | 2019–2020 | – |
| William Canales | El Salvador | 2021 | – |
| Yosimar Quinones | Colombia | 2021–2022 | |
| Otoneil Lopez | El Salvador | 2023 | |
| Walter Guevara | El Salvador | 2023–2024 | |
| Gerson Mayen | El Salvador | 2025 | |
| Fredy Espinoza | El Salvador | 2025–Present | |

=== Personnel honours ===
- (Apertura 1999) (El Salvador) Magdonio Corrales Goals Scored (9)
- (Clausura 2001) (El Salvador) Rudis Corrales Goals Scored (13)
- (Apertura 2016) (Colombia) Jefferson Viveros Goals Scored (13)

== Records ==
- Debut in the Primera División: 2–3 FAS, Estadio Santaneco, 7 May 1972
- Highest league position: 1st in the Primera División (Apertura 1999, Apertura 2000)
- Best post season finish: Runners up (Apertura 1999, Apertura 2000)
- Record League victory: 10–0 v Santa Clara, 22 November 2000
- Largest Home victory, Primera División: 10–0 v Santa Clara, 22 November 2000
- Largest Away victory, Primera División: 3–0 v TBD, 29 October 2018
- Largest Home loss, Primera División: 1–3 v TBD, 4 November 2018
- Largest Away loss, Primera División Final: 5-0 v Alianza, 24 May 2024
- Highest scoring game Municipal Limeno Involved: 8–3 vs. Dragón (Primera División, May 2003)
- Record attendance at Estadio Jose Ramon Flores : 25,133 v TBD, Primera División (TBD)
- Most League appearances: 317, TBD (TBD)
- Most League goals scored: total, TBD, TBD (1998–2003)
- Most League goals scored, season: 13 (TBD)
- Worst season: TBD 2002–2003: 0 win, 0 draws and 0 losses (0 points)
- Debut in CONCACAF Competition: Municipal Limeño 1–2 Forge FC; Estadio Cuscatlán; 23 October 2020
- First CONCACAF League match: Municipal Limeño 1–2 Forge FC; Estadio Cuscatlán; 23 October 2020

=== Individual records ===
- Record appearances (all competitions): TBD, 822 from 1957 to 1975
- Record appearances (Primera Division): Paraguayan TBD, 64 from 2018 to 2019
- Most capped player for El Salvador: 76 (17 whilst at Limeno), Rudis Corrales
- Most international caps for El Salvador while a Limeno player: 17, Rudis Corrales
- Most caps won whilst at Limeno: 17, Rudis Corrales.
- Record scorer in league: Rudis Corrales, 77
- First goal scorer in International competition: Kevin Oviedo (v. Forge FC; Estadio Cuscatlan; 23 October 2020)
- Most goals in a season (all competitions): TBD, 62 (1927/28) (47 in League, 15 in Cup competitions)
- Most goals in a season (Primera Division): Rudis Corrales (Clausura 2001) and Jefferson Viveros (Apertura 2016), 13
- Longest streak without conceding a goal: Abiel Aguilera 495 minutes (Apertura 2017)
- First international to play for Limeno – Jorge Vásquez, 1973 (El Salvador 1967–1972)
- First Limeno international – Magdonio Corrales (for El Salvador v Guatemala, 19 March 1999)

=== Most appearances ===
| No. | Player | period | Appearances |
|---|---|---|---|
| 1 | (El Salvador) TBD | 2019 | tbd |
| 2 | (El Salvador) TBD | 2019 | tbd |
| 3 | (El Salvador) TBD | 2019 | tbd |
| 4 | (El Salvador) TBD | 2019 | tbd |
| 5 | (El Salvador) Deris Umanzor | 1998–2004 | 193 |
| 6 | (El Salvador) Walter Guevara | 2016–2021 | 138 |
| 7 | (El Salvador) Mario Machado | 2016–2022 | 132 |
| 8 | (Honduras) Clayvin Zúñiga | 2016-2020; 2025 | 129 |
| 9 | (El Salvador) Yuvini Salamanca | 2003, 2016, 2018–2019 | 120 |
| 10 | (El Salvador) Francisco Álvarez | 1999–2003, 2012, 2016–2018 | 114 |
| 11 | (El Salvador) Juan Hernández | 2019 | 80 |
| 12 | (El Salvador) Abiel Aguilera | 2016–2021 | 79 |

Note: Players in bold text are still active with Limeno

=== Top goalscorers (Apertura/Clausura season games only) ===
| No. | Player | period | Goals |
|---|---|---|---|
| 1 | (El Salvador) Rudis Corrales | 1997–2003 | 77 |
| 2 | (Honduras) Clayvin Zúñiga | 2016–2020; 2025 | 40 |
| 3 | (El Salvador) Josué Galdámez | 1999–2004, 2008 | 28 |
| 4 | (El Salvador) Magdonio Corrales | 1993–2002, 2004 | 27 |
| 5 | (El Salvador) Deris Umanzor | 1998–2004 | 26 |
| 9 | (Mexico) Yair Delgadillo | 2023-2024 | 19 |
| 6 | (Colombia) Carlos Villarreal | 2000 | 18 |
| 9 | (Mexico) Luis Ángel Landín | 2023-2024 | 17 |
| 4 | (El Salvador) Dimas Blanco | 1974-75 | 14 |
| 4 | (Paraguay) Nelson Brizuela | 1974-75 | 14 |
| 4 | (Honduras) Jorge Martinez | 1995-96 | 14 |
| 7 | (Colombia) Jefferson Viveros | 2017 | 13 |
| 8 | (Colombia) Jorge Sandoval | 2002 | 13 |
| 9 | (Paraguay) Gabriel Garcete | 2004, 2009 | 12 |
| 10 | (Uruguay) Raul Falero | 2000–2001 | 10 |
| 10 | (Uruguay) Ruben Alonso | 1995 | 10 |

Note: Players in bold text are still active with Municipal Limeno

== Other departments ==
=== Football ===
==== Reserve team ====
The reserve team serves mainly as the final stepping stone for promising young players under the age of 21 before being promoted to the main team. The second team is coached by Eduardo Castillo. the team played in the Primera División Reserves, their greatest successes were winning the Reserve championships in Clausura 2001, Apertura 2008. It plays its home matches at TBD, adjacent to the first team's ground, and it is coached by Saul Prudenció.

=== Reserve squad ===
Note: Flags indicate national team as defined under FIFA eligibility rules; some limited exceptions apply. Players may hold more than one non-FIFA nationality.

| No. | Pos. | Nation | Player |
|---|---|---|---|
| 31 | MF | SLV | Delwin Hernández |
| 32 | MF | SLV | Vicente Hernández |
| 33 | FW | SLV | Luis Blanco |
| 34 | FW | SLV | Nelson Escobar |
| 36 | MF | SLV | Cristian Alvarado |
| 37 | FW | SLV | Erick Espinoza |
| 40 | DF | SLV | José Canales |
| 41 | MF | SLV | Luis Rivera |
| 42 | DF | SLV | Ramón Velásquez |

| No. | Pos. | Nation | Player |
|---|---|---|---|
| 43 | MF | SLV | Erick Santos |
| 44 | MF | SLV | Carlos Ábrego |
| 46 | MF | SLV | Ericsson Chávez |
| 47 | MF | SLV | Paul Cedillos |
| 49 | FW | SLV | Kevin Majano |
| 53 | DF | SLV | Douglas Vásquez |
| 55 | GK | SLV | Marcos Hernández |
| 60 | DF | SLV | Josué Ramírez |

==== Junior teams ====
The youth team (under 17 and under 15) has produced some of El Salvador's top football players, including TBD and TBD. It plays its home matches at TBD, adjacent to the first team's ground, and it is coached by Saul Prudenció. Alfredo Romero (2018)

==== Women's team ====
The women's first team, which is led by head coach Douglas del Cid, features several members of the El Salvador national ladies team. Their greatest successes were reaching the Clausura 2019, Clausura 2025 Apertura 2025 and Clausura 2026 finals, which they ended up losing 7–1 to FAS Ladies team, 3-1 to Alianza Women, 2-1 to Alianza Women and 1-0 to Alianza Women. The women's team was created in 2018 and will first participate in 2019

=== Women's squad ===
As of May 2026 Note: Flags indicate national team as defined under FIFA eligibility rules; some limited exceptions apply. Players may hold more than one non-FIFA nationality.

| No. | Pos. | Nation | Player |
|---|---|---|---|
| — | FW | SLV | Damaris Quélez (captain) |
| — | | SLV | Raquel Ramirez |
| — | | COL | Maria Rodallega |
| — | GK | SLV | Angela Panameno |
| — | | SLV | Ismelda Cruz |
| — | | SLV | Vanessa Reyes |
| — | | SLV | Wendy Rubio |
| — | | SLV | Giselle Gomez |
| — | | SLV | Paz Gomez |
| — | | SLV | Clara Hernandez |
| — | | SLV | Jaquelin Colindres |

| No. | Pos. | Nation | Player |
|---|---|---|---|
| 2 | | SLV | Iveth Rubio |
| 3 | | SLV | Jeymir Prudencio |
| 8 | | SLV | Gisselle Flores |
| 17 | | SLV | Cristina Molina |
| 19 | | SLV | Keny Morales |
| 20 | | SLV | Angy Martinez |
| 41 | | SLV | Teresa Torres |

=== In ===
Note: Flags indicate national team as defined under FIFA eligibility rules; some limited exceptions apply. Players may hold more than one non-FIFA nationality.

| No. | Pos. | Nation | Player |
|---|---|---|---|
| — | MF | SLV | Jessica Ortiz (From FAS Femenino) |
| — | DF | SLV | Johana Martinez (From Fuerte San Francisco Femenino) |
| — | GK | SLV | Oneydi Cuellar (From FAS Femenino)} |
| — | DF | SLV | Nahomy Galan (From FAS Femenino) |
| — | DF | SLV | Sintia Benitez (From Free Agents) |

| No. | Pos. | Nation | Player |
|---|---|---|---|
| — | DF | SLV | Meylin Sanchez (From Aguila Femenina) |
| — | | SLV | TBD (From TBD) |
| — | | SLV | TBD (From TBD) |
| — | | SLV | TBD (From TBD) |
| — | | SLV | TBD (From TBD) |

=== Out ===
Note: Flags indicate national team as defined under FIFA eligibility rules; some limited exceptions apply. Players may hold more than one non-FIFA nationality.

| No. | Pos. | Nation | Player |
|---|---|---|---|
| — | | COL | Sindy Constante (To TBD) |
| — | | COL | Sara Angulo (To TBD) |
| — | | SLV | Jackeline Reyes (To TBD) |
| — | | SLV | Alejandra Saravia (To TBD) |
| — | | SLV | Nury Guzman (To TBD) |

| No. | Pos. | Nation | Player |
|---|---|---|---|
| — | | SLV | Claudia Braco (To TBD) |
| — | | SLV | Francheska Rivera (To TBD) |
| — | | SLV | Yohana Medrano (To Alianza Women) |
| — | | SLV | Hesly Avalos (To Alianza Women) |

=== Coaching staff ===
As of January 20265

| Position | Staff |
|---|---|
| Manager | (El Salvador) Douglas del Cid (*) |
| Assistant Manager | (El Salvador) Jose Leonidas Montano (*) |
| Goalkeeper Coach | (El Salvador) Carlos Salmeron (*) |
| Physiotherapist | (El Salvador) Rosa Yajaira Useda (*) |
| Fitness Coach | (El Salvador) Mario Edgardo Serrano (*) |
| Utility | (El Salvador) Jose Armando Ramirez (*) |
| Sport Director | (El Salvador) Rimey Ramiro Quezada |

==== Coaching History ====
| Years | Coach Name |
|---|---|
| 2016–2019 | (El Salvador) TBD |
| 2019-2020 | (El Salvador) TBD |
| 2021 | (El Salvador) Jorge Pena |
| 2024–2025 | (El Salvador) Douglas del Cid |
| 2025 | (El Salvador) Saul Prudenció |
| 2026–Present | (El Salvador) Douglas del Cid |
