= Óscar Benítez (footballer, born 1948) =

Salvadoran footballer and manager (born 1948)

Personal information
- Full name: Óscar Emigdio Benítez
- Date of birth: October 6, 1948 (age 78)
- Place of birth: San Vicente, El Salvador

Youth career
- CD Once Berlinés

Senior career*
| Years | Team | Apps | (Gls) |
| 1964–1975 | CD Santiagueño | | |

Managerial career
- 1987: CD Águila (assistant)
- 1991: El Salvador
- 1991–1992: Real España
- 1993–1994: CD Águila
- 1999: CD FAS
- 1999–2000: Once Municipal
- 1999-2000: El Salvador
- 2000–2001: Motagua
- 2001: Atlético Balboa
- 2001–2002: CD Municipal Limeño
- 2003: CD Aspirante
- 2004: Once Municipal
- 2005: Coca Cola
- 2006: Alianza FC
- 2006–2007: CD Platense
- 2008: San Salvador FC
- 2008: CD Luis Ángel Firpo
- 2019: CD Águila (sport director)
- * Club domestic league appearances and goals

Óscar Emigdio Benítez (born October 6, 1948) is a Salvadoran former professional football player and manager. Benítez became a coach and has spent almost two decades managing several clubs in El Salvador and Honduras.

== Playing career ==
Benítez was born in San Vicente, El Salvador.

== Coaching career ==
In 1991, Benítez was named head coach of the El Salvador national team, which he managed at the 1991 UNCAF Nations Cup. His second period as El Salvador's manager began in 1999, and ended one year later. During that time, El Salvador failed to qualify to the 2002 World Cup. He left the national team for Honduran champions Motagua.

In 1993, Benítez was appointed as coach of C.D. Águila, replacing Juan Quarterone.

In 2006, Benítez signed as coach of Alianza F.C., replacing Miguel Mansilla.

In September 2008, Benítez signed as new coach of C.D. Luis Ángel Firpo, replacing Miguel Aguilar Obando. In December of the same year, Benítez was replaced by Agustín Castillo.

In January 2019, Benítez was appointed as sports director of C.D. Águila.

== Administrative roles ==
Óscar Emigdio Benítez was elected the head of Asociación de Entrenadores de Fútbol de El Salvador (AEFES) from 2011 until he lost the election to Douglas Vidal Jimenez in 2015. He was re-elected to the head of Asociación de Entrenadores de Fútbol de El Salvador (AEFES) from 2018 until 2020.

Benítez was elected to be the coordinator of the El Salvador national team in June 2009. However, after The under 20 was eliminated due to the failure of the right paperwork for the player Dustin Corea, Benítez resigned due to his part in the scandal.

== Honours ==
=== Manager ===
C.D. Municipal Limeño

- Primera División runner-up: Apertura 1999

Real España

- Liga Nacional de Honduras runner-up: 1992
