= Erber Burgos =

Salvadoran footballer (born 1969)

Personal information
- Full name: Erber Alfredo Burgos Ángel
- Date of birth: August 4, 1969 (age 57)
- Place of birth: Antiguo Cuscatlán, El Salvador
- Height: 1.71 m (5 ft 7 in)
- Position: Midfielder

Senior career*
Years	Team	Apps	(Gls)
1990–1999	FAS		
2000–2002	Águila		
2003	San Salvador F.C.		
2003–2004	Topiltzín		
2005–2007	Dragón		
2008	San Salvador F.C.	18	(0)
2008–2009	Alba-Acajutla		

International career^{‡}
1995–2000	El Salvador	22	(0)
- * Club domestic league appearances and goals ‡ National team caps and goals as of 22 January 2011

Erber Alfredo Burgos Ángel (born 8 April 1969) is a retired Salvadoran football player.

== Club career ==
Burgos had a lengthy spell with local giants FAS, before moving to Águila and later to San Salvador F.C., Topiltzín and Dragón. He retired at Second Division Alba-Acajutla in 2009.

== International career ==
Burgos made his debut for El Salvador in a December 1995 UNCAF Nations Cup match against Costa Rica and has earned a total of 22 caps, scoring no goals. He has represented his country in 4 FIFA World Cup qualification matches and played at the 2001 and 2005 UNCAF Cups.

His final international was a July 2000 friendly match against Mexico.
