= Nelson Brizuela =

Paraguayan footballer and manager (born 1950)

Personal information
- Full name: Nelson César Brizuela Ojeda
- Date of birth: 10 January 1950 (age 76)
- Place of birth: Encarnación, Paraguay
- Position: Forward

Senior career*
Years	Team	Apps	(Gls)
- Club Universal
- Club Guaraní
- Deportivo Irapuato
- C.S.D. Municipal
1970	Sonsonate		
1972	Miami Gatos		
1972–1973	Cincinnati Comets		
1973–1974	Excélsior		
1974–1975	Limeño		

International career
- Paraguay

Managerial career
- 1990–1991: Marconi Fairfield
- 1992: Parramatta Eagles
- 1993–1994: Limeño
- 1997–1998: FAS
- 1999–2000: Firpo
- 2000: Dragón
- 2001: Atlético Marte
- 2002: Delfín
- 2003: Atlético Balboa
- 2005: LDU Loja
- 2006–2007: Alianza
- * Club domestic league appearances and goals

Nelson César Brizuela Ojeda (born 10 January 1950) is a football player and coach.
