= Hugo Coria =

Argentine footballer and manager

Personal information
- Full name: Hugo Norberto Coria Boianelli
- Date of birth: April 1, 1961 (age 65)
- Place of birth: Argentina
- Position: Striker

Senior career*
Years	Team	Apps	(Gls)
–1988	San Martín de Mendoza		
1989–1994	CD Águila		

Managerial career
- 1999–2000: Águila
- 2002: Águila
- 2003–2004: Águila
- 2004–2005: LA Firpo
- 2006: San Salvador FC
- 2006: Municipal Limeño
- 2007: LA Firpo
- 2007–2008: Once Municipal
- 2009–2010: LA Firpo
- 2011: Águila
- 2012–2014: CD Aguiluchos USA
- 2020: Águila
- * Club domestic league appearances and goals

Hugo Norberto Coria Boianello (born 1 April 1961) is a former Argentine football player and manager. He played football for San Martín de Mendoza and C.D. Águila.

Coria has had two spells as manager of C.D. Águila in El Salvador.

== Honours ==
=== Manager ===
==== Club ====
C.D. Águila

- Primera División
  - Champion: Apertura 1999, Apertura 2000
  - Runners-up: Apertura 2003

C.D. Luis Ángel Firpo

- Primera División
  - Runners-up: Clausura 2007
