= List of Primera División de El Salvador coaches (1998–present) =

This is a list of Primera División de Fútbol Profesional Coaches. Some of these managers were appointed as caretaker managers prior to being given a permanent position.

== Current Primera Division coaches ==
As of January, 2026'

Name	Nationality	Age	Club	From	Played in Primera Division
Juan Carlos Chávez	MEX	59	Aguila	2025	N/A
Ernesto Corti	ARG	63	Alianza	2025	N/A
Angel Piazzi	ARG	56	Cacahuatique	2026	N/A
Adrian Sanchez	MEX	48	FAS	2026	N/A
Marvin Solano Abarca	CRC	70	Firpo	2025	N/A
Rolando Torres	SLV	43	Fuerte San Francisco	2025	1998-2016
Daniel Corti	ARG	43	Hercules	2026	N/A
Efrain Burgos	SLV	65	Metapan	2025	1980-1995
Jorge Rodriguez	SLV	55	Municipal Limeno	2025	1992–1997, 2001, 2002-2008
Agustin Castillo	PER	63	Platense	2025	1990-1997
Juan Pablo Buch	COL ESP	39	Zacatecoluca	2026	N/A
Luis Marin	CRC	52	Inter FA	2025	N/A

== List of coaches (1998–present) ==
List of coaches in the Apertura and Clausura format

- (Uruguay) Rubén Alonso - Alianza F.C. (1998), C.D. Municipal Limeño (2000), San Salvador F.C. (2002, 2003, 2004), A.D. Isidro Metapan (2005-2006), Independiente Nacional 1906 (2007), San Salvador F.C. (2008), UES (2010), C.D. Aguila (2010), Alianza F.C. (2015-2016), C.D. Chalatenango (2016), C.D. Sonsonate (2017-2018), Fuerte San Francisco (2024-2025)
- (Chile) Julio Escobar - Firpo (1998, 1999, 2000, 2001), Alianza F.C. (2002)
- (Serbia) Miloš Miljanić - C.D. Aguila (1998), Firpo (2001, 2002, 2003, 2006), San Salvador F.C. (2004), Alianza F.C. (2010-2011), Alianza F.C. (2013)
- (El Salvador) Oscar Emigdio Benitez - C.D. FAS (1998-1999), C.D. Municipal Limeño (1999), Atletico Balboa (2001), C.D. Municipal Limeño (2002), Atletico Balboa (2004), Once Municipal (2004), Alianza F.C. (2006), San Salvador F.C. (2008), Firpo (2008)
- (El Salvador) Pedro Interiano - Santa Clara
- (El Salvador) Luis Angel Leon (†) - ADET (1999), C.D. Juventud Olímpica Metalio (2000), Atletico Marte (2002)
- (Brazil) Antonio Carlos Vieira - C.D. Aguila (1999), C.D. Dragon (2002), Municipal Limeno (2003)
- (Mexico) (Italy) Reno Renucci - Alianza F.C. (1999)
- (El Salvador) José Luis Rugamas - Arabe Marte (1999)
- (Paraguay) Nelson Brizuela - Firpo (1999), C.D. Dragon (1999, 2000, 2002), Atlético Marte (2001), Atletico Balboa (2003), A.D. Isidro Metapan (2003), Municipal Limeno (2005), Alianza F.C. (2006, 2007)
- (Argentina) Juan Quarterone (†) (1954-2022) - ADET (1999, 2000, 2001), Atletico Balboa (2002), Alianza F.C. (2003), C.D. Chalatenango (2003), Atletico Balboa (2004, 2005), San Salvador F.C. (2005, 2006), Independiente Nacional 1906 (2006, 2007)
- (Argentina) Hugo Coria - C.D. Aguila (1999, 2000, 2001, 2002, 2003, 2004, 2011, 2020), San Salvador F.C. (2005-2006), Once Municipal (2007, 2008), Firpo (2010)
- (Uruguay) Juan Masnik (†) - C.D. FAS (1999)
- (Guatemala) Walter Cifuentes - C.D. Juventud Olímpica Metalio (1999)
- (El Salvador) Genaro Sermeño (†) - C.D. Juventud Olímpica Metalio (1999)
- (El Salvador) Rubén Guevara - C.D. FAS (1999, 2001), C.D. Aguila (2002), Municipal Limeno (2003), Once Lobos (2005)
- (Argentina) Manuel Oberti - Alianza F.C. (2000)
- (El Salvador) Juan Ramón Paredes - Atlético Marte (2000, 2010-2011), C.D. FAS (2000), Alianza F.C. (2001, 2002, 2004, 2005, 2012), San Salvador F.C. (2005), Independiente Nacional 1906 (2006), Once Municipal (2008), C.D. Sonsonate (2018)
- (El Salvador) Ricardo Mena Laguán - C.D. FAS (2000), C.D. Arcense (2003), C.D. FAS (2012)
- (El Salvador) Manuel Mejía - Santa Clara (2000)
- (El Salvador) Saul Molina - Santa Clara (2000), San Luis (2001), Atletico Balboa (2001), C.D. Aguila (2005)
- (El Salvador) Jaime Rodriguez (†) - Alianza F.C. (2000), San Salvador F.C. (2002)
- (El Salvador) Mauricio Pachín González (†) - Atlético Marte (2000, 2001)
- (El Salvador) Jose Mario Martínez - Atletico Balboa (2000, 2002, 2011), C.D. Dragon (2003, 2013), C.D. Vista Hermosa (2005, 2006, 2007), C.D. Vista Hermosa (2009-2010), Firpo (2016)
- (Peru) Agustin Castillo - Municipal Limeno (2000-2001), FAS (2001-2005), C.D. Chalatenango (2005, 2006, 2007), C.D. Aguila (2008, 2021-2022), Firpo (2008, 2009), FAS (2011, 2012, 2015), C.D. Sonsonate (2016), Metapan (2018), Jocoro (2023-2024), FAS (2024-2025), Platense (2025-2026)
- (El Salvador) Cesar Acevedo - C.D. FAS (2000)
- (Brazil) Roberto Abruzzesse - C.D. FAS (2000)
- (Uruguay) (Armenia) Garabet Avedissian - C.D. FAS (2000, 2001), Atletico Balboa (2003), Sonsonate (2017)
- (Uruguay) Saul Lorenzo Rivero (†) - C.D. Aguila (2001), A.D. Isidro Metapan (2004), San Salvador F.C. (2004), Firpo (2005), San Salvador F.C. (2007)
- (Uruguay) Carlos Reyes (†) - Alianza F.C. (2001)
- (El Salvador) Miguel Aguilar Obando - C.D. Dragon (2001), Firpo (2008), C.D. Aguila (2018)
- (Chile) Hernán Carrasco Vivanco (†) - Municipal Limeno (2001), Atletico Marte (2002)
- (Mexico) Jorge Martinez - Atlético Marte (2001)
- (North Macedonia) Kiril Dojčinovski (†) - Municipal Limeno (2001), Firpo (2002)
- (El Salvador) Edwin Portillo - A.D. Isidro Metapan (2001, 2002, 2003, 2004, 2005, 2006, 2007-2013, 2017-2018, 2019), C.D. Aguila (2014), C.D. Sonsonate (2015-2016)
- (Ecuador) Alfredo Encalada - C.D. Dragon (2001)
- (El Salvador) Oscar "Lagarto" Ulloa - A.D. Isidro Metapan (2001)
- (El Salvador) José Calazán - A.D. Isidro Metapan (2001)
- (Argentina) Roberto Fabrizio - A.D. Isidro Metapan (2002)
- (El Salvador) Abraham Vasquez - Firpo (2002)
- (Colombia) German Gutiérrez de Piñeres - Alianza F.C. (2002)
- (El Salvador) Ricardo Guardado - C.D. Arcense (2002, 2003)
- (Colombia) Henry Vanegas - Municipal Limeno (2002, 2003), Alianza F.C. (2003), Atletico Balboa (2005), San Salvador F.C. (2007), C.D. Vista Hermosa (2008), Dragon
- (Honduras) Ramón Maradiaga - C.D. Aguila (2003)
- (El Salvador) Domingo Ramos - C.D. Dragon (2003)
- (Honduras) Gilberto Yearwood- C.D. Dragon (2003)
- (Argentina) (Italy) Carlos Barone - Atletico Balboa (2003)
- (Costa Rica) Manuel Alberto Solano - Atletico Balboa (2003)
- (El Salvador) Luis Roberto Hernández - C.D. Chalatenango (2003)
- (Uruguay) Gustavo de Simone - Firpo (2003-2004), Atletico Balboa (2008), Nejapa F.C. (2009, 2010)
- (Argentina) Raul Cocherari - A.D. Isidro Metapan (2003), C.D. Chalatenango (2004), Municipal Limeno (2004)
- (Argentina) Jorge Alberto Garcia - Municipal Limeno (2003, 2004), Atletico Balboa (2004, 2005, 2009), C.D. Aguila (2005), Once Municipal, C.D. Vista Hermosa (2007, 2008, 2010), UES (2013-2014), C.D. Pasaquina (2014), Atletico Marte (2012-2013, 2015)
- (Argentina) Marcelo Javier Zuleta - Alianza F.C. (2003), A.D. Isidro Metapan (2004)
- (Argentina) Raul Donsati - C.D. Arcense (2003, 2004)
- (El Salvador) Rene Ramos - A.D. Isidro Metapan (2003)
- (Brazil) Paulo Roberto de Olivera - Atletico Balboa (2003)
- (El Salvador) Jesus Fuentes - Atletico Balboa (2003)
- (Uruguay) Juan Mujica (†) - Alianza F.C. (2004)
- (Uruguay) Daniel Uberti - San Salvador F.C. (2004), Nejapa F.C. (2008)
- (Argentina) Andres Novara - C.D. Arcense (2004)
- (Uruguay) Julio Cesar Cortez (†) - C.D. Aguila (2004)
- (Uruguay) Ricardo Ortiz "Tato" - Municipal Limeno (2004)
- (El Salvador) Carlos Recinos - Once Lobos (2004)
- (Argentina) Carlos Alberto de Toro - C.D. Aguila (2004), Atletico Balboa (2008, 2009), Firpo (2019)
- (El Salvador) Henry Rojas - A.D. Isidro Metapan (2004)
- (Uruguay) Miguel Mansilla (†) - Once Municipal (2005-2006), Alianza F.C. (2006)
- (Argentina) Roberto Gamarra - Once Lobos (2005), Atletico Balboa (2008, 2010), C.D. FAS (2008, 2009, 2010, 2016), Alianza F.C. (2011), UES (2012), Firpo (2013, 2020-2022), C.D. Dragon (2014-2015), A.D. Isidro Metapan (2016-2017), Atletico Balboa (2026-Present)
- (El Salvador) Leonel Carcamo - Firpo (2005, 2006, 2007), San Salvador F.C. (2006), Alianza F.C. (2012), Once Municipal (2012), Firpo (2014), Santa Tecla (2019)
- (El Salvador) (Serbia) Vladan Vićević - C.D. Aguila (2005, 2006), C.D. Chalatenango (2007-2008), Alianza F.C. (2011-2012), C.D. Aguila (2013)
- (Chile) Oscar del Solar - Alianza F.C. (2005)
- (Guatemala) Carlos Alberto Mijangos - C.D. Chalatenango (2005), Atlético Balboa (2010), C.D. Aguila (2010), C.D. Chalatenango (2017)
- (El Salvador) Nelson Mauricio Ancheta - C.D. FAS (2005, 2006, 2007-2008), Atletico Balboa (2006), Once Municipal (2006-2007), Nejapa F.C. (2009), Alianza F.C. (2009), C.D. Aguila (2010), Once Municipal (2010-2011), Firpo (2011-2012), C.D. Dragon (2013-2014), C.D. Chalatenango (2016), C.D. Dragon (2016-2017), Jocoro F.C. (2018), C.D. Sonsonate (2019), Jocoro F.C. (2019), El Vencedor (2020), Limeno (2020-2021, 2023), Atletico Marte (2021-2022), Fuerte San Francisco (2024), Zacatecoluca (2025)
- (Mexico) Carlos de los Cobos - C.D. FAS (2005, 2006)
- (Brazil) Odir Jacques - Alianza F.C. (2006)
- (El Salvador) Antonio Orellana Rico (†) - San Salvador F.C. (2006, 2007)
- (Argentina) Julio Asad - C.D. FAS (2006, 2007)
- (Panama) Gary Stempel - C.D. Aguila (2007)
- (El Salvador) Luis Ramirez Zapata - C.D. Aguila (2007). Atletico Balboa (2009)
- (Argentina) Pablo Centrone - Alianza F.C. (2007, 2008), C.D. Aguila (2008, 2009)
- (Argentina) Horacio Cordero - Firpo (2007)
- (El Salvador) Carlos Antonio Meléndez - Nejapa F.C. (2007), C.D. Chalatenango (2008, 2009), Alacranes Del Norte (2010), UES (2013), Atletico Marte (2015)
- (Argentina) Abel Moralejo - Once Municipal (2007)
- (Argentina) Gerardo Reinoso - Firpo (2008)
- (El Salvador) Mauricio Cienfuegos - Nejapa F.C. (2008)
- (El Salvador) Juan Ramón Sánchez - C.D. Chalatenango (2008), Juventud Independiente (2008, 2009, 2011-2015), Aguila (2016), Firpo (2016-2017), Sonsonate (2018), C.D. Chalatenango (2019-2020), Santa Tecla (2024)
- (El Salvador) Mario Elias Guevara - Once Municipal (2008), C.D. Sonsonate (2016-), Once Deportivo de Ahuachapan (2021)
- (El Salvador) Jorge Abrego - Juventud Independiente (2008), C.D. FAS (2010), UES (2011, 2012-2013), Juventud Independiente (2015), Platense (2023-2024)
- (El Salvador) Víctor Coreas - C.D. Vista Hermosa (2008-2009), Limeno (2009, 2010), Vista Hermosa (2010-2011), Aguila (2012-2013), Pasaquina (2015), Dragon (2017), Limeno (2018), El Vencedor (2019), Isidro Metapan (2019-2020), Jocoro (2021, 2023) , Cacahuatique (2025)
- (El Salvador) Emiliano Pedrozo - Nejapa (2008), FAS (2016-2017)
- (Uruguay) Carlos Jurado (†) - Alianza (2008, 2009)
- (Spain) Carlos García Cantarero - Alianza (2009)
- (El Salvador) Armando Contreras - Vista Hermosa (2009)
- (Brazil) Eraldo Correia - Aguila (2009), Aguila (2010), Municipal Limeno (2010), UES (2011), Aguila (2011-2012), Aguila (2015), Firpo (2017-2018, 2022), Pasaquina (2018-2019)
- (Brazil) Eduardo Santana (†) - Atletico Balboa (2009)
- (Argentina) Ramiro Cepeda - Atletico Marte (2009, 2010), Firpo (2011), Alianza F.C. (2012-2013), Firpo (2013-2014), Alianza F.C. (2015)
- (El Salvador) Miguel Angel Soriano - Limeno (2009), Alianza F.C. (2009), UES (2011)
- (El Salvador) Adolfo Menendez - C.D. FAS (2010)
- (El Salvador) Edgar Henriquez - UES (2010), Firpo (2012-2013), Santa Tecla F.C. (2013-2014), UES (2016), Jocoro F.C. (2022), Chalatenango (2022)
- (Colombia) Alberto Rujana- C.D. FAS (2010)
- (El Salvador) Luis Guevara Mora- Atletico Marte (2010)
- (El Salvador) Marcos Pineda - Once Municipal (2011)
- (Argentina) Juan Andres Sarulyte - Once Municipal (2011-2012), Alianza F.C. (2013), C.D. Pasaquina (2015), C.D. Chalatenango (2015), Atletico Marte (2016), Jocoro (2020), Santa Tecla F.C. (2020)
- (El Salvador) Salvador Coreas - C.D. Aguila (2011)
- (El Salvador) Willian Renderos Iraheta - C.D. FAS (2011), Santa Tecla F.C. (2013), UES (2014-2015), C.D. Sonsonate (2016), C.D. Chalatenango (2017-2018), C.D. Audaz (2018), Municipal Limeno (2019, 2024), Independiente (2020), Firpo (), Inter FA (2025)
- (El Salvador) José Rolando Perez - C.D. Vista Hermosa (2011)
- (El Salvador) Carlos Romero - C.D. Vista Hermosa (2011), C.D. Dragon (2017), C.D. Audaz (2018), C.D. Aguila (2018-2019), Jocoro (2020-2021, 2024-Present), Once Deportivo de Ahuachapan (2021), Limeno (2022), Firpo, Atletico Balboa (2026)
- (Honduras) José Efraín Núñez (†) - C.D. Vista Hermosa (2012)
- (El Salvador) Guillermo Rivera- Santa Tecla (2012), Atletico Marte (2013-2014), C.D. Dragon (2015), FAS (2019-2020), Platense (2022), Firpo (2023-2024), Municipal Limeno (2024), Once Deportivo (2025)
- (Argentina) Osvaldo Escudero - Santa Tecla (2012, 2014-2016, 2020), C.D. FAS (2016-2017), C.D. Aguila (2017-2018), Atletico Marte (2022-2023)
- (El Salvador) Omar Sevilla - Aguila (2011), Aguila (2013), Dragon (2015-2016), Pasaquina (2017), Independiente (2019-2020), Atletico Marte (2023), Fuerte San Francisco (2026)
- (El Salvador) William Osorio (†) - C.D. FAS (2013)
- (Colombia) Jaime de la Pava - C.D. FAS (2013)
- (El Salvador) Jorge Humberto Rodriguez - A.D. Isidro Metapan (2013-2016, 2023-2024), Alianza F.C. (2017-2019, 2024), C.D. FAS (2020-2022), Limeno (2025-Present)
- (Honduras) Raúl Martínez Sambulá - C.D. Aguila (2013-2014)
- (Uruguay) Alejandro Curbelo - Alianza F.C. (2014)
- (El Salvador) Efrain Burgos - C.D. FAS (2014), UES (2015), Atletico Marte (2016), UES (2016-2017), C.D. Dragon (2017), Isidro Metapan (2025-2026)
- (Colombia) Jairo Ríos Rendón - C.D. Aguila (2014)
- (Argentina) Daniel Messina - C.D. Aguila (2014), C.D. Aguila (2019, 2024-2025)
- (Panama) Julio Dely Valdés - C.D. Aguila (2015)
- (Argentina) Daniel Fernández - Atletico Marte (2015), Alianza F.C. (2016)
- (El Salvador) Santos Rivera - Dragon (2015), Aguila (2019)
- (El Salvador) Abel Blanco - Dragon (2015)
- (Honduras) German Pérez - Sonsonate(2015), Audaz (2017, 2018)
- (El Salvador) Ennio Mendoza and Mario Elias Guevara - C.D. Sonsonate (2015, 2016, 2017)
- (Chile) Héctor Jara - Sonsonate (2015)
- (El Salvador) Ricardo Serrano - Chalatenango (2015-2016, 2021, 2023)
- (El Salvador) Douglas Vidal Jiménez - Atletico Marte (2015-2016)
- (Paraguay) Hugo Ovelar - Pasaquina (2016), Limeno (2017), Sonsonate (2018)
- (Argentina) Carlos Eduardo Martínez Sequeira - FAS (2016), Isidro Metapan (2024)
- (El Salvador) Milton Meléndez - Alianza (2016, 2020-2022)
- (Argentina) Edgardo Malvestiti - Aguila (2016)
- (Argentina) Ernesto Corti - Santa Tecla (2016-2017, 2022-2023), Aguila (2020-2021, 2023=2024), Alianza (2025-2026)
- (El Salvador) Mauricio Alfaro - Limeno (2016)
- (El Salvador) Geovanni Portillo - Chalatenango (2016, 2018)
- (El Salvador) Horacio Reyes - UES (2016)
- (El Salvador) Francisco Robles - Limeno (2016-2017), Pasaquina (2018)
- (Uruguay) Darío Larrosa - Aguila (2016)
- (Uruguay) Jorge Daniel Casanova - Aguila (2017)
- (El Salvador) Ernesto Góchez - Sonsonate (2017)
- (El Salvador) Álvaro Misael Alfaro - Isidro Metapan (2017), Audaz (2018), Chalatenango (2018-2019), Limeno (2020), Isidro Metapan (2021)
- (El Salvador) Cristian Edgardo Álvarez - FAS (2017-2018)
- (El Salvador) Manuel Carranza Murillo - Pasaquina (2017-2018)
- (Colombia) Diego Pizarro - Dragon (2018)
- (Argentina) Emiliano Barrera - Limeno (2018)
- (Uruguay) Rubén da Silva - Santa Tecla (2018), Sonsonate (2019-2020), Santa Tecla (2021), Once Deportivo (2022), Platense (2023)
- (El Salvador) Marvin Benitez - Aguila (2018), Jocoro (2019), Dragon (2022-2024), (2024)
- (El Salvador) Giovanni Trigueros - Firpo (2018), Limeno (2021)
- (Colombia) Álvaro de Jesús Gómez - FAS (2018)
- (El Salvador) Erick Dowson Prado - FAS (2018-2019), Chalatenango (2021-2022), Platense (2022), Once Deportivo (2023-2024), Isidro Metapan (2025)
- (Argentina) Christian Díaz - Santa Tecla (2018-2019)
- (Argentina) Ángel Piazzi - Chalatenango (2018), Cacahuatique (2025-2026)
- (El Salvador) Jorge Calles - Firpo (2018)
- (El Salvador) Asdrúbal Kaselly Flores - Firpo (2018-2019)
- (Paraguay) Cristóbal Cubilla - Jocoro (2019)
- (Uruguay) Pablo Quiñones - Audaz (2019), Once Deportivo (2019), Jocoro (2021), Dragon (2024-2025), Cacahuatique (2025), Fuerte San Francisco (2026-Present)
- (El Salvador) Jose Manuel Romero - Pasaquina (2019), Jocoro (2020), Municipal Limeno (2021), Municipal Limeno (2025)
- (El Salvador) Omar Pimentel - Sonsonate (2019)
- (El Salvador) Rodolfo Gochez - Santa Tecla (2019, 2021), Once Deportivo de Ahuachapan (2022)
- (Uruguay) Sebastian Abreu - Santa Tecla (2019)
- (Colombia) Wilson Gutierrez - Alianza (2019-2020)
- (Spain) Juan Cortes Diéguez - Independiente (2019), Once Deportivo (2020), Alianza (2020), Isidro Metapan (2021), Platense (2023)
- (El Salvador) Oscar Eduardo Alvarez - Jocoro F.C. (2019)
- (Mexico) Marco Sanchez - Santa Tecla (2019)
- (El Salvador) Jaime Medina - Santa Tecla (2020-2021)
- (Argentina) Cristian Domizzi - Atletico Marte (2020-2021), Aguila (2021)
- (El Salvador) Osvaldo Figueroa - Isidro Metapan (2020)
- (Costa Rica) Ricardo Montoya - Chalatenango (2020-2021)
- (Uruguay) Fabio Castroman - Sonsonate (2021)
- (Colombia) Armando Osma Rueda (†) - Aguila (2021)
- (Mexico) Bruno Martinez - Once Deportivo (2020-2021), Municipal Limeno (2021)
- (El Salvador) Hector Omar Mejía - Isidro Metapan (2022), Isidro Metapan (2024), Isidro Metapan (2026)
- (El Salvador) Ivan Ruiz - Platense (2022)
- (Ecuador) Octavio Zambrano - FAS (2022-2023)
- (Honduras) Jorge Pineda - Jocoro (2022)
- (Argentina) Sebastian Bini - Aguila (2022-2023)
- (El Salvador) Adonai Martínez - Alianza (2022)
- (Honduras) Guillermo Bernandez - Jocoro (2023)
- (Colombia) Eduardo Lara - Alianza (2023)
- (El Salvador) Efren Mercano - FAS (2023)
- (Mexico) Raúl Arias - FAS (2023-2024)
- (El Salvador) Francisco Medrano - Santa Tecla (2023, 2024)
- (El Salvador) Abel Flores - Municipal Limeno (2023)
- (El Salvador) Jesús Álvarez - Fuerte San Francisco (2024)
- (El Salvador) Manuel Acevedo - Dragon (2024)
- (Argentina) Gabriel Alvarez - Firpo (2024-2025), Hercules (2025), Isidro Metapan (2026-)
- (Argentina) Fabio Gaston Larramendi - Fuerte San Francisco (2024), Once Deportivo (2025)
- (Uruguay) Richard Preza- FAS (2024)
- (Argentina) Julio Zamora - Isidro Metapan (2024)
- (Mexico) Jorge Martinez Merino - Fuerte San Francisco (2024)
- (Argentina) Daniel Corti - Cacahuatique (2024-2025), Fuerte San Francisco (2025), Hercules (2026)
- (El Salvador) David Hernandez - Platense (2024-Present)
- (El Salvador) Manuel Meme Gonzalez - Dragon (2025)
- (Spain) David Caneda - FAS (2025)
- (Mexico) Cristian Flores - FAS (2025)
- (Costa Rica) Marvin Solano Abarco - Firpo (2025-Present)
- (Argentina) Horacio Lugo - Inter FA (2025)
- (El Salvador) Saul Prucedino - Municipal Limeno (2025)
- (Costa Rica) Luis Marin - Inter FA (2025-2026)
- (Mexico) Juan Carlos Chávez - C.D. Aguila (2025-2026)
- (El Salvador) Francisco Hernandez - Hercules (2025)
- (El Salvador) Rolando Torres - Fuerte San Francisco (2025-2026)
- (Uruguay) Nicolás Dos Santos - Hercules (2025-Present)
- (El Salvador) Chepe Martínez - Zacatecoluca (2026)
- (Mexico) Adrián Sánchez - FAS (2026-Present)
- (Colombia) (Spain) Juan Pablo Buch - Zacatecoluca (2026)
- (El Salvador) Isaac Zelaya - C.D. Aguila (2026)
- (Argentina) Santiago Davio - C.D. Aguila (2026-Present)
- (El Salvador) Marcos Portillo - Alianza (2026-Present)
- (Colombia) Martin Garcia - Platense (2026-Present)
- (Argentina) Roberto Pompei - Alianza (2026)
- (El Salvador) Hector Salazar - INCA-Aruba (2026-Present)
- (Argentina) Diego Vásquez - Alianza (2026-Present)
- (Argentina) José Giacone - Inter Santa Tecla (2026-Present)

== List of El Salvador Football Primera División Championship winning coaches ==
Vladan Vicevic who won the league in Clausura 2006

As of May 24, 2026

Final		Winning manager		Club
1948-49	SLV	Armando Chacón	SLV	Once Municipal
1950-51	SLV	Jorge Méndez (Player/coach)	SLV	Dragon
1951-52	SLV	Victor Manuel Ochoa	SLV	FAS
1952-53	SLV	Miguel Herrera (Player/coach)	SLV	Dragon
1953-54	SLV	Victor Manuel Ochoa	SLV	FAS
1955	SLV	Conrado Miranda (Player/coach)	SLV	Atlético Marte
1955-56	SLV	Conrado Miranda (Player/coach)	SLV	Atlético Marte
1956-57	SLV	Conrado Miranda (Player/coach)	SLV	Atlético Marte
1957-58	ARG	Alberto Cevasco	SLV	FAS
1959	SLV	Conrado Miranda	SLV	Aguila
1960-61	HON	Carlos Padilla	SLV	Aguila
1961-62	ARG	César Viccino	SLV	FAS
1962	ARG	Raúl Miralles (Player/coach)	SLV	FAS
1963-64	SLV	Victor Manuel Ochoa	SLV	Aguila
1964	SLV	Victor Manuel Ochoa	SLV	Aguila
1965-66	CHI	Hernán Carrasco	SLV	Alianza F.C.
1966-67	CHI	Hernán Carrasco	SLV	Alianza F.C.
1967-68	BRA	Zózimo (Player/coach)	SLV	C.D. Águila
1969	CHI	Hernán Carrasco	SLV	Atlético Marte
1970	CHI	Hernán Carrasco	SLV	Atlético Marte
1971	ARG	Mario Rey	SLV	Juventud Olímpica
1972	SLV	Juan Francisco Barraza	SLV	C.D. Águila
1973	ARG	Juan Quarterone (Player/coach)	SLV	Juventud Olímpica
1974-75	ARG	Juan Quarterone	SLV	Platense
1975-76	SLV	Conrado Miranda	SLV	C.D. Águila
1976-77	SLV	Conrado Miranda	SLV	C.D. Águila
1977-78	SLV	José Castro	SLV	C.D. FAS
1978-79	SLV	José Castro	SLV	C.D. FAS
1979-80	SLV	Juan Antonio Merlos	SLV	Santiagueño
1980-81	SLV	Armando Contreras Palma	SLV	Atlético Marte
1981	SLV	Juan Francisco Barraza	SLV	C.D. FAS
1982	SLV	Armando Contreras Palma	SLV	Atlético Marte
1983	SLV	Juan Francisco Barraza	SLV	C.D. Águila
1984	ARG	Juan Quarterone	SLV	C.D. FAS
1985	SLV	Armando Contreras Palma	SLV	Atlético Marte
1986-87	CHI	Ricardo Sepúlveda	SLV	Alianza F.C.
1987-88	CHI	Hernán Carrasco	SLV	C.D. Águila
1988-89	CHI	Julio Escobar	SLV	C.D. Luis Angel Firpo
1989-90	CHI	Hernán Carrasco	SLV	Alianza F.C.
1990-91	URU	Juan Masnik	SLV	C.D. Luis Angel Firpo
1991-92	MKD	Kiril Dojčinovski	SLV	C.D. Luis Angel Firpo
1992-93	MKD	Kiril Dojčinovski	SLV	C.D. Luis Angel Firpo
1993-94	URU	Gustavo Faral	SLV	Alianza F.C.
1994-95	URU	Saul Lorenzo Rivero	SLV	C.D. FAS
1995-96	URU	Saul Lorenzo Rivero	SLV	C.D. FAS
1996-97	URU	Juan Masnik	SLV	Alianza F.C.
1997-98	CHI	Julio Escobar	SLV	C.D. Luis Angel Firpo
Apertura 1998	URU	Rubén Alonso	SLV	Alianza F.C.
Clausura 1999	CHI	Julio Escobar	SLV	C.D. Luis Angel Firpo
Apertura 1999	ARG	Hugo Coria	SLV	C.D. Aguila
Clausura 2000	CHI	Julio Escobar	SLV	C.D. Luis Angel Firpo
Apertura 2000	ARG	Hugo Coria	SLV	C.D. Aguila
Clausura 2001	URU	Saul Lorenzo Rivero	SLV	C.D. Aguila
Apertura 2001	SLV	Juan Ramón Paredes	SLV	Alianza F.C.
Clausura 2002	PER	Agustín Castillo	SLV	C.D. FAS
Apertura 2002	PER	Agustín Castillo	SLV	C.D. FAS
Clausura 2003	URU	Rubén Alonso	SLV	San Salvador F.C.
Apertura 2003	PER	Agustín Castillo	SLV	C.D. FAS
Clausura 2004	URU	Juan Martín Mujica	SLV	Alianza F.C.
Apertura 2004	PER	Agustín Castillo	SLV	C.D. FAS
Clausura 2005	PER	Agustín Castillo	SLV	C.D. FAS
Apertura 2005	SLV	Jose Mario Martínez	SLV	C.D. Vista Hermosa
Clausura 2006	SRB	Vladan Vicevic	SLV	C.D. Aguila
Apertura 2006	SLV	Nelson Mauricio Ancheta	SLV	Once Municipal
Clausura 2007	SLV	Edwin Portillo	SLV	A.D. Isidro Metapan
Apertura 2007	ARG	Horacio Cordero	SLV	C.D. Luis Angel Firpo
Clausura 2008	ARG	Gerardo Reinoso	SLV	C.D. Luis Angel Firpo
Apertura 2008	SLV	Edwin Portillo	SLV	A.D. Isidro Metapan
Clausura 2009	SLV	Edwin Portillo	SLV	A.D. Isidro Metapan
Apertura 2009	ARG	Roberto Gamarra	SLV	C.D. FAS
Clausura 2010	SLV	Edwin Portillo	SLV	A.D. Isidro Metapan
Apertura 2010	SLV	Edwin Portillo	SLV	A.D. Isidro Metapan
Clausura 2011	ARG	Roberto Gamarra	SLV	Alianza F.C.
Apertura 2011	SLV	Edwin Portillo	SLV	A.D. Isidro Metapan
Clausura 2012	SLV	Víctor Coreas	SLV	C.D. Aguila
Apertura 2012	SLV	Edwin Portillo	SLV	A.D. Isidro Metapan
Clausura 2013	ARG	Roberto Gamarra	SLV	LA Firpo
Apertura 2013	SLV	Jorge Rodriguez	SLV	A.D. Isidro Metapan
Clausura 2014	SLV	Jorge Rodriguez	SLV	A.D. Isidro Metapan
Apertura 2014	SLV	Jorge Rodriguez	SLV	A.D. Isidro Metapan
Clausura 2015	ARG	Osvaldo Escudero	SLV	Santa Tecla F.C.
Apertura 2015	URU	Rubén Alonso	SLV	Alianza F.C.
Clausura 2016	SLV	Omar Sevilla	SLV	C.D. Dragon
Apertura 2016	ARG	Ernesto Corti	SLV	Santa Tecla F.C.
Clausura 2017	ARG	Ernesto Corti	SLV	Santa Tecla F.C.
Apertura 2017	SLV	Jorge Rodriguez	SLV	Alianza F.C.
Clausura 2018	SLV	Jorge Rodriguez	SLV	Alianza F.C.
Apertura 2018	ARG	Christian Díaz	SLV	Santa Tecla F.C.
Clausura 2019	SLV	Carlos Romero	SLV	C.D. Aguila
Apertura 2019	COL	Wilson Gutiérrez	SLV	Alianza F.C.
2020 Clausura	ESP	Juan Cortes Diéguez (Cancelled) *	SLV	Once Deportivo (Cancelled) *
Apertura 2020	SLV	Milton Melendez	SLV	Alianza F.C.
Clausura 2021	SLV	Jorge Humberto Rodriguez	SLV	FAS
Apertura 2021	SLV	Milton Melendez	SLV	Alianza F.C.
Clausura 2022	SLV	Milton Melendez	SLV	Alianza F.C.
Apertura 2022	ECU	Octavio Zambrano	SLV	FAS
Clausura 2023	SLV	(Season Cancelled) *	SLV	(Season Cancelled) *
Apertura 2023	ARG	Ernesto Corti	SLV	Aguila
Clausura 2024	SLV	Jorge Humberto Rodriguez	SLV	Alianza
Apertura 2024	SLV	Erick Prado	SLV	Once deportivo
Clausura 2025	ARG	Ernesto Corti	SLV	Alianza
Apertura 2025	CRC	Marvin Solano	SLV	LA Firpo
Clausura 2026	MEX	Adrian Sanchez	SLV	FAS
