= Primera División de Fútbol Profesional Clausura 2005 =

Primera División de Fútbol Profesional de El Salvador
- Champions: C.D. FAS (16th title)
- Relegated: Once Lobos & Municipal Limeno
- Top goalscorer: (El Salvador) TBD (11)

The Primera División de Fútbol Profesional Clausura 2005 season (officially "Torneo Clausura 2005") started on January 29, 2005.

The season was composed of the following clubs:

- C.D. FAS
- C.D. Municipal Limeño
- San Salvador F.C.
- C.D. Águila
- C.D. Luis Ángel Firpo
- A.D. Isidro Metapán
- C.D. Atlético Balboa
- Alianza F.C.
- Once Lobos
- Once Municipal

== Team information ==
=== Personnel and sponsoring ===
| Team | Chairman | Head coach | Kitmaker | Shirt sponsor |
|---|---|---|---|---|
| Águila | (El Salvador) | (Argentina) Jorge Alberto Garcia | TBD | TBD |
| Alianza | (El Salvador) | (El Salvador) Juan Ramon Paredes | TBD | TBD |
| Atletico Balboa | (El Salvador) Noel Benítez | (Argentina) Juan Quarterone | TBD | TBD |
| FAS | (El Salvador) Reynaldo Valle | (Peru) Agustín Castillo | TBD | TBD |
| Firpo | (El Salvador) TBD | (Uruguay) Saul Rivero | TBD | TBD |
| Isidro Metapan | (El Salvador) José Gumercindo Landaverde | (El Salvador) Edwin Portillo | TBD | TBD |
| Municipal Limeno | (El Salvador) Gumercindo Ventura | (Paraguay) Nelson Brizuela | Galaxia | LG |
| Once Lobos | (El Salvador) TBD | (El Salvador) Ruben Guevara | TBD | TBD |
| Once Municipal | (El Salvador) TBD | (Uruguay) Miguel Mansilla | TBD | TBD |
| San Salvador F.C. | (El Salvador) Marco Flores | (Argentina) Hugo Coria | TBD | TBD |

== Managerial changes ==
=== Before the season ===
| Team | Outgoing manager | Manner of departure | Date of vacancy | Replaced by | Date of appointment | Position in table |
|---|---|---|---|---|---|---|
| C.D. Aguila | (Argentina) Carlos Alberto de Toro | TBD | December 2004 | (Argentina) Jorge Alberto Garcia | Jan 2005 | |
| San Salvador F.C. | (Uruguay) Saul Rivero | TBD | December 2004 | (Argentina) Hugo Coria | Jan 2005 | |
| Firpo | (Uruguay) Gustavo de Simone | TBD | December 2004 | (Uruguay) Saul Rivero | Jan 2005 | |
| Municipal Limeno | (Argentina) Raul Cocherai | TBD | December 2004 | (Paraguay) Nelson Brizuela | Jan 2005 | |
| Once Lobos | (El Salvador) Carlos Recinos | TBD | December 2004 | (El Salvador) Ruben Guevara | Jan 2005 | |
| Once Municipal | (El Salvador) Henry Rojas | TBD | December 2004 | (Uruguay) Miguel Mansilla | Jan 2005 | |

=== During the season ===
| Team | Outgoing manager | Manner of departure | Date of vacancy | Replaced by | Date of appointment | Position in table |
|---|---|---|---|---|---|---|
| Once Lobos | (El Salvador) Ruben Guevara | TBD | March 2005 | (Argentina) Roberto Gamarra | March 2005 | |
| Atletico Balboa | (Argentina) Juan Quarterone | TBD | April 2005 | (Colombia) Henry Vanegas | April 2005 | |
| Firpo | (Uruguay) Saul Rivero | TBD | April 2005 | (El Salvador) Leonel Carcamo | April 2005 | |
| C.D. Aguila | (Argentina) Jorge Alberto Garcia | TBD | April 2005 | (El Salvador) Saul Molina | April 2005 | |

== Clausura 2005 standings ==
| Pos | Team | Pld | W | D | L | GF | GA | GD | Pts | Qualification or relegation |
|---|---|---|---|---|---|---|---|---|---|---|
| 1 | C.D. FAS | 18 | 10 | 5 | 3 | 30 | 19 | +11 | 35 | |
| 2 | C.D. Municipal Limeño | 18 | 8 | 6 | 4 | 25 | 19 | +6 | 30 (Note: C.D. Municipal Limeño had a poor aggregate during both Clasura and Apertura and were forced to have a play-off.) | Relegated to Segunda División de Fútbol Salvadoreño |
| 3 | C.D. Luis Ángel Firpo | 18 | 8 | 5 | 5 | 29 | 21 | +8 | 29 | |
| 4 | Alianza F.C. | 18 | 7 | 7 | 4 | 25 | 17 | +8 | 28 | |
| 5 | Once Municipal | 18 | 8 | 3 | 7 | 19 | 24 | −5 | 27 | |
| 6 | A.D. Isidro Metapán | 18 | 6 | 4 | 8 | 20 | 25 | −5 | 22 | |
| 7 | C.D. Atlético Balboa | 18 | 5 | 6 | 7 | 22 | 21 | +1 | 21 | |
| 8 | C.D. Águila | 18 | 5 | 5 | 8 | 24 | 27 | −3 | 20 | |
| 9 | San Salvador F.C. | 18 | 5 | 5 | 8 | 24 | 32 | −8 | 20 | |
| 10 | Once Lobos | 18 | 2 | 6 | 10 | 22 | 35 | −13 | 12 | Relegated to Segunda División de Fútbol Salvadoreño |

Notes:

C.D. Municipal Limeño played off against Colo-Colo losing the fixture and were eliminated to Segunda División de Fútbol Salvadoreño

== Top scorers ==
| Pos. | Nat. | Player | Team | Goals |
|---|---|---|---|---|
| 1 | (Colombia) | Martín García | Alianza F.C. | 11 |
| 2 | (Panama) | Anel Canales | Once Municipal | 9 |
| 3 | (Argentina) | Alejandro de la Cruz Bentos | C.D. FAS | 9 |
| 4 | (Paraguay) | Nestor Ayala | Once Lobos | 8 |
| 5 | (El Salvador) | Manuel Martinez | C.D. Luis Ángel Firpo | 8 |
| 6 | (El Salvador) | Gabriel Garcette | C.D. Municipal Limeño | 7 |
| 7 | (El Salvador) | Eric Prado | A.D. Isidro Metapán | 7 |
| 8 | (Uruguay) | Juan Carlos Reyes | C.D. Luis Ángel Firpo | 7 |

== Semifinals 1st leg ==
June 12, 2005

| C.D. Luis Ángel Firpo | 6-1 | C.D. Municipal Limeño |

June 12, 2005

| Alianza F.C. | 1-0 | C.D. FAS |

== Semifinals 2nd leg ==
June 19, 2005

| C.D. Municipal Limeño | 1-1 | C.D. Luis Ángel Firpo |

June 19, 2005

| C.D. FAS | 4-1 | Alianza F.C. |

== Final ==
June 26, 2005

| C.D. FAS | 3–1 | C.D. Luis Ángel Firpo |
|---|---|---|
| Gilberto Murgas 34'; Víctor Mafla 95'; Alejandro Bentos 100' | | Adonai Martínez 82' |

Estadio Cuscatlán

FAS:
| GK | TBA | (El Salvador) Luís Manotas Castro |
| DF | TBA | (El Salvador) Ramón Flores |
| DF | TBA | (El Salvador) Rafael Tobar |
| DF | TBA | (El Salvador) Víctor Velásquez |
| DF | TBA | (El Salvador) Alfredo Pacheco |
| MF | TBA | (Colombia) Victor Mafla |
| MF | TBA | (El Salvador) Gilberto Murgas |
| MF | TBA | (El Salvador) Cristian Álvarez | (substituted off) 73' (yellow card) |
| MF | TBA | (El Salvador) Ernesto Góchez | (substituted off) 109' (yellow card) |
| FW | TBA | (Argentina) Alejandro Bentos |
| FW | TBA | (Costa Rica) Bernal Mullins | (substituted off) 75' |
Substitutes:
| MF | TBA | (El Salvador) Jaime Gómez | (substituted on) 73' |
| FW | TBA | (El Salvador) Williams Reyes | (substituted on) 75' |
| FW | TBA | (El Salvador) Juan Carlos Moscoso | (substituted on) 109' |
Manager:
(Peru) Agustín Castillo

Luis Angel Firpo:
| GK | TBA | (Dominican Republic) Óscar Abreu Mejía |
| DF | TBA | (El Salvador) Mauricio Quintanilla |
| DF | TBA | (Brazil) Mauro Cajú | Sent off (straight red) |
| DF | TBA | (El Salvador) Marcos Portillo |
| DF | TBA | (El Salvador) Jorge Sánchez |
| MF | TBA | (El Salvador) Isaac Zelaya (yellow card) |
| MF | TBA | (El Salvador) Guillermo Morán | (substituted off) 73' |
| MF | TBA | (El Salvador) Víctor Merino Dubón | (substituted off) 65' |
| MF | TBA | (El Salvador) Adonai Martínez |
| FW | TBA | (El Salvador) Manuel Black Martinez |
| FW | TBA | (El Salvador) José Orlando Martínez | (substituted off) 60' |
Substitutes:
| FW | TBA | (Uruguay) Juan Carlos Reyes | (substituted on) 60' |
| MF | TBA | (El Salvador) Héctor Canjura | (substituted on) 65' |
| MF | TBA | (Uruguay) Dario Larrosa | (substituted on) 73' |
Manager:
(El Salvador) Leonel Cárcamo

Clasura 2005 champions

16th title

== List of foreign players in the league ==
This is a list of foreign players in Apertura 2005. The following players:

1. have played at least one apertura game for the respective club.
2. have not been capped for the El Salvador national football team on any level, independently from the birthplace

C.D. Águila

- (Honduras) Gerson Vásquez
- (Honduras) Jorge Wagner
- (Costa Rica) Alejandro Sequeira
- (Brazil) Fábio Pereira de Azevedo
- (Panama) Julio Medina III

Alianza F.C.

- (Colombia) Martin Garcia
- (Colombia) Yhoner Toro
- (Colombia) Hermes Martínez Misal
- (Colombia) Gabriel Menjumea
- (Colombia) John Marulanda

Atletico Balboa

- (Colombia) Juan Carlos Mosquera
- (Colombia) Luis Carlos Asprilla
- (Honduras) Ernesto Noel Aquino
- (Honduras) Franklin Webster
- (Honduras) Roberto Bailey Jnr

C.D. FAS

- (Colombia) Victor Hugo Mafla
- (Costa Rica) Bernard Mullins Campbell
- (Honduras) Williams Reyes
- (Argentina) Alejandro Bentos
- (Brazil) Marcelo Messias

C.D. Luis Ángel Firpo

- (Dominican Republic) Óscar Abreu Mejía
- (Brazil) Mauro Cajú
- (Brazil) Ricardo Machado
- (Uruguay) Dario Larrosa
- (Uruguay) Juan Carlos Reyes

(player released mid season) (player Injured mid season) Injury replacement player

A.D. Isidro Metapán

- (Uruguay) Alcides Bandera
- (Argentina) Andrés Bazzano
- (Honduras) Juan Bicca
- (Uruguay) Álvaro Méndez
- (Paraguay) Nelson Duarte

Municipal Limeno

- (Paraguay) Pablo Caballero
- (Paraguay) Gabriel Garcete
- (Honduras) Christian Santamaría
- (Honduras) Carlos Güity
- (Honduras) Francis Reyes

Once Lobos

- (Paraguay) Nestor Ayala
- (Brazil) Anderson Batista
- (Uruguay) Pablo Quinones
- (Colombia) Libardo Carvajal

Once Municipal

- (Brazil) Alessandro De Oliveira
- (Brazil) Paulo Cesar Rodriguez
- (Panama) Anel Canales
- (Colombia) Miguel Solís
- (Colombia) Juan Pablo Chacon

San Salvador F.C.

- (Argentina) Rodrigo Lagos
- (Colombia) Alexander Obregón
- (Argentina) Carlos Escalante
- (Colombia) Gustavo Cabrera
