= Primera División de Fútbol Profesional Apertura 2004 =

Primera División de Fútbol de El Salvador
- Champions: C.D. FAS (15th title)
- Relegated: None
- Top goalscorer: (Panama) Nicolás Muñoz (12)

The Salvador Primera División de Fútbol Profesional Apertura 2004 season (officially "Torneo Apertura 2004") started on August 7, 2004.

The season was composed of the following clubs:

- C.D. FAS
- Municipal Limeño
- San Salvador F.C.
- C.D. Águila
- C.D. Luis Ángel Firpo
- A.D. Isidro Metapán
- C.D. Atlético Balboa
- Alianza F.C.
- Once Lobos
- Once Municipal

== Team information ==
=== Personnel and sponsoring ===
Team	Chairman	Head coach	Kitmaker	Shirt sponsor
Águila	(El Salvador)	(Uruguay) Julio Cesar Cortez	TBD	TBD
Alianza	(El Salvador)	(Uruguay) Juan Mujica	TBD	TBD
Atletico Balboa	(El Salvador) Noel Benítez	(Argentina) Jorge Alberto Garcia	TBD	TBD
FAS	(El Salvador) Reynaldo Valle	(Peru) Agustín Castillo	TBD	TBD
Firpo	(El Salvador) TBD	(Uruguay) Gustavo de Simone	TBD	TBD
Isidro Metapan	(El Salvador) José Gumercindo Landaverde	(Argentina) Marcelo Javier Zuleta	TBD	TBD
Municipal Limeno	(El Salvador) Gumercindo Ventura	(Uruguay) Ricardo Ortiz "Tato"	Galaxia	LG
Once Lobos	(El Salvador) TBD	(El Salvador) Carlos Recinos	TBD	TBD
Once Municipal	(El Salvador) TBD	(El Salvador) Oscar Emigdio Benitez	TBD	TBD
San Salvador F.C.	(El Salvador) Marco Flores	(Uruguay) Saul Rivero	TBD	TBD

== Managerial changes ==
=== Before the season ===
Team	Outgoing manager	Manner of departure	Date of vacancy	Replaced by	Date of appointment	Position in table
Atletico Balboa	(El Salvador) Oscar Emigdio Benitez	TBD	May 2004	(Argentina) Jorge Alberto Garcia	June 2004	
San Salvador F.C.	(Uruguay) Ruben Alonso	TBD	June 2004	(Uruguay) Saul Rivero	June 2004	
Municipal Limeno	(Argentina) Jorge Alberto Garcia	TBD	June 2004	(Uruguay) Ricardo Ortiz "Tato"	July 2004	

=== During the season ===
Team	Outgoing manager	Manner of departure	Date of vacancy	Replaced by	Date of appointment	Position in table
Isidro Metapan	(Argentina) Marcelo Javier Zuleta	TBD	August 2004	(El Salvador) Edwin Portillo	August 2004	
Alianza F.C.	(Uruguay) Juan Mujica	TBD	September 2004	(El Salvador) Juan Ramon Paredes	September 2004	
Municipal Limeno	(Uruguay) Ricardo Ortiz Tato	TBD	September 2004	(Argentina) Raul Cocherai	September 2004	
C.D. Aguila	(Uruguay) Julio Cesar Cortez	TBD	October 2004	(Argentina) Carlos Alberto de Toro	October 2004	
Atletico Balboa	(Argentina) Jorge Alberto Garcia	TBD	October 2004	(Argentina) Juan Quarterone	October 2004	
Once Municipal	(El Salvador) Oscar Emigdio Benitez	TBD	November 2004	(El Salvador) Henry Rojas	November 2004	

== Apertura 2004 standings ==
Last updated August 2, 2004

Pos	Team	Pld	W	D	L	GF	GA	GD	Pts	Qualification
1	C.D. FAS	18	9	5	4	26	19	+7	32	Qualified for semifinal
2	San Salvador F.C.	18	9	5	4	30	33	−3	32	Qualified for semifinal
3	C.D. Atlético Balboa	18	7	9	2	26	13	+13	30	Qualified for semifinal
4	C.D. Luis Ángel Firpo	18	7	8	3	26	13	+13	29	4th place playoff
5	A.D. Isidro Metapán	18	8	5	5	25	24	+1	29	4th place playoff
6	C.D. Águila	18	5	8	5	24	20	+4	23	
7	Alianza F.C.	18	6	3	9	19	25	−6	21	
8	Once Lobos	18	4	7	7	22	21	+1	19	
9	Once Municipal	18	5	4	9	15	26	−11	19	
10	Municipal Limeño	18	0	6	12	12	31	−19	6	

== 4th place playoff ==
December 5, 2004

C.D. Luis AngelFirpo	0-2	A.D. Isidro Metapán
Nil		Johnny Descolines 6', Alcides Banderas 8'

== Playoffs ==
Semifinals
1	FAS	1	3	4
4	Isidro Metapán	2	0	2
2	San Salvador F.C.	1	1	2
3	Atlético Balboa	1	3	4

Finals
1	C.D. FAS (pen.)	4
3	Atlético Balboa	3

== Semifinals 1st leg ==
December 5, 2004

C.D. Atlético Balboa	1-1	San Salvador F.C.
Franklin Vinosis Webster 20'		Paulo Cesar Rodriguez 27'

December 5, 2004

A.D. Isidro Metapán	2-1	C.D. FAS
Escobar 23'; Juan Carlos Reyes 26'		Williams Reyes 85'

== Semifinals 2nd leg ==
December 12, 2004

San Salvador F.C.	1-3	C.D. Atlético Balboa
Alexander Obregón 44'		Carlos Asprilla 116'; Nildeson 20', 119'

Atletico Balboa won 4-2 on aggregate.

December 12, 2004

C.D. FAS	3-0	A.D. Isidro Metapán
Victor Hugo Mafla 10'; Williams Reyes 70'; Alejandro Bentos 88'		Nil

FAS won 4-2 on aggregate.

== Final ==
December 21, 2003

C.D. FAS	0–0	C.D. Atlético Balboa
Penalties
Gilberto Murgas (penalty scored); Ernesto Góchez (penalty missed); Víctor Mafla (penalty scored); Emerson Umaña (penalty missed); Alfredo Pacheco (penalty scored); Víctor Velásquez (penalty missed); Marcelo Messias (penalty scored)	4–3	(penalty scored) Nildeson; (penalty scored) Hídzar Henríquez; (penalty scored) Eugenio Valerio; (penalty missed) Carlos Asprilla; (penalty missed) Yubini Salamanca; (penalty missed) Armando Mercado; (penalty missed) Lisandro González

Estadio Cuscatlán

FAS:
GK	TBA	(El Salvador) Luís Castro
DF	TBA	(Brazil) Marcelo Messias
DF	TBA	(El Salvador) Marvin González (red card)
DF	TBA	(El Salvador) Víctor Velásquez
DF	TBA	(El Salvador) Alfredo Pacheco
MF	TBA	(Colombia) Víctor Mafla	(yellow card) 79' (substituted off) 112'
MF	TBA	(El Salvador) Gilberto Murgas (yellow card) 32'
MF	TBA	(El Salvador) Cristian Álvarez	(substituted off) 65'
MF	TBA	(El Salvador) Ramón Flores
FW	TBA	(Argentina) Alejandro Bentos
FW	TBA	(Honduras) Williams Reyes	(substituted off) 106'
Substitutes:
MF	TBA	(El Salvador) Ernesto Góchez	(substituted on) 65'
FW	TBA	(El Salvador) Emerson Umaña	(substituted on) 106'
Manager:
(Peru) Agustín Castillo

Atlético Balboa:
GK	TBA	(Colombia) Juan Carlos Mosquera Perez
DF	TBA	(El Salvador) Armando Mercado
DF	TBA	(Honduras) Ernesto Noel Aquino (yellow card) 25'
DF	TBA	(El Salvador) Elmer Martínez
DF	TBA	(El Salvador) Yubini Salamanca
MF	TBA	(El Salvador) Hídzar Henríquez (yellow card) 31'
MF	TBA	(El Salvador) Joaquín Molina	(substituted off) 84'
MF	TBA	(El Salvador) Abraham Monterrosa	(substituted off) 67'
MF	TBA	(Honduras) Eugenio Valerio
FW	TBA	(Brazil) Nildeson (yellow card) 68'
FW	TBA	(Honduras) Franklin Webster	Sent off (straight red)
Substitutes:
FW	TBA	(Colombia) Carlos Asprilla	(substituted on) 67'
MF	TBA	(El Salvador) Lisandro González	(substituted on) 84'
Manager:
(Argentina) Juan Quarterone

Apertura 2004 champions

15th title

== Top scorers ==
Pos.	Nat.	Player	Team	Goals
1	(Panama)	Nicolás Muñoz	C.D. FAS	12

== List of foreign players in the league ==
This is a list of foreign players in Apertura 2004. The following players:

1. have played at least one apertura game for the respective club.
2. have not been capped for the El Salvador national football team on any level, independently from the birthplace

C.D. Águila

- (Honduras) Arnold Cruz
- (Uruguay) Dario Larrosa
- (Brazil) Fábio Pereira de Azevedo
- (Brazil) Jimmy Vargas (Djimi Vargas)
- (Argentina) Marcelo Gonzales

Alianza F.C.

- (Colombia) Martin Garcia
- (Uruguay) Ariel Fontela
- (Uruguay) Yari Silvera
- (Uruguay) Alejandro Curbelo
- (Uruguay) Luis Fernando Espindola

Atletico Balboa

- (Colombia) Juan Carlos Mosquera
- (Colombia) Luis Carlos Asprilla
- (Honduras) Ernesto Noel Aquino
- (Honduras) Franklin Webster
- (Honduras) Eugenio Valerio

C.D. FAS

- (Colombia) Victor Hugo Mafla
- (Honduras) Williams Reyes
- (Argentina) Alejandro Bentos
- (Brazil) Marcelo Messías
- (Panama) Nicolás Muñoz

C.D. Luis Ángel Firpo

- (Dominican Republic) Óscar Abreu Mejía
- (Brazil) Mauro Cajú
- (Uruguay) Manuel Abreu
- (Argentina) Sebastian Rudman
- (Colombia) Juan Pablo Chacon

(player released mid season) (player Injured mid season) Injury replacement player

A.D. Isidro Metapán

- (Uruguay) Juan Carlos Reyes
- (Uruguay) Juan Bicca
- (Uruguay) Alcides Bandera
- (Argentina) Andrés Bazzano
- (Haiti) Johnny Descolines

Municipal Limeno

- (Honduras) Francis Reyes
- (Uruguay) Marcos Adrian Sum
- (Uruguay) Álvaro Méndez
- (Brazil) Marcelo Marquez dos Santos
- (Uruguay) Leonardo Sum

Once Lobos

- (Uruguay) Claudio Pasadi
- (Brazil) Anderson Batista
- (Colombia) Libardo Carvajal
- (Uruguay) Pablo Quinones
- (Colombia) Nito Gonzales

Once Municipal

- (Colombia) Miguel Solís
- (Brazil) Alessandro De Oliveira
- (Colombia) Victor Jaramillo
- (Honduras) Wilmer Ramos
- (Argentina) Patricio Gallardo

San Salvador F.C.

- (Colombia) Alexander Obregón
- (Argentina) Carlos Escalante
- (Colombia) Gustavo Cabrera
- (Brazil) Paulo Cesar Rodriguez
- (Uruguay) Fernando Fajardo Balzani
