= Primera División de Fútbol Profesional Apertura 2007 =

Primera División de Fútbol Profesional de El Salvador
- Dates: 11 August 2007 - 16 December 2007
- Champions: Luis Angel Firpo (8th title)
- Promoted: Nejapa FC
- Relegated: None
- Top goalscorer: (El Salvador) Williams Reyes (11)

The Apertura 2007 Primera División de Fútbol Profesional season is the 38th since its establishment in 1969. The season began on 11 August 2007, and ended with the final on 16 December.

Isidro Metapán are the defending league champions, having won their First Premiership title.

Luis Angel Firpo beat FAS in the final on penalties and won their eighth title.

Nejapa FC were promoted from Segunda Division.

== Stadiums ==
Stadium	Team
Estadio Cuscatlán	San Salvador F.C.
Estadio Cuscatlán	Alianza F.C.
Estadio Nejapa	Nejapa F.C.
Estadio Sergio Torres	C.D. Luis Ángel Firpo
Estadio Simeón Magaña	Once Municipal
Estadio Juan Francisco Barraza	C.D. Águila
Estadio Luis Amílcar Moreno	C.D. Vista Hermosa
Estadio José Gregorio Martínez	C.D. Chalatenango
Estadio Jorge Calero Suárez	A.D. Isidro Metapán
Estadio Oscar Quiteño	C.D. FAS

== Team information ==
=== Personnel and sponsoring ===
Team	Chairman	Head coach	Kitmaker	Shirt sponsor
Águila	(El Salvador)	(El Salvador) Luis Ramirez Zapata	TBD	Tigo, Cerveza Brahva Nash
Alianza	(El Salvador)	(Argentina) Pablo Centrone	TBD	Agua Cristal
C.D. Chalatenango	(El Salvador)	(Serbia) Vladan Vicevic		Pepsi, Tigo
FAS	(El Salvador) Reynaldo Valle	(El Salvador) Nelson Mauricio Ancheta	TBD	Pilsener, Tigo American Airlines
Firpo	(El Salvador) TBD	(Argentina) Horacio Cordero	Galaxia	Boquitas Diana Pilsener
Isidro Metapan	(El Salvador)	(El Salvador) Edwin Portillo	TBD	Tigo, Arroz San Pedro
Nejapa F.C.	(El Salvador)	(El Salvador) Carlos Antonio Melendez	TBD	Tigo, Caja de Credito Quezaltepeque
Once Municipal	(El Salvador) TBD	(Argentina) Abel Moralejo	TBD	Tigo La Geo, Pilsener
San Salvador F.C.	(El Salvador) Marco Flores	(Uruguay) Saul Rivero	TBD	Tigo, Farmacia San Nicolas Gatorade
C.D. Vista Hermosa	(El Salvador) TBD	(Argentina) Jorge Alberto Garcia	TBD	Tigo, Pollo Campestre

== Managerial Changes ==
=== Before the season ===
Team	Outgoing manager	Manner of departure	Date of vacancy	Replaced by	Date of appointment	Position in table
Firpo	(Argentina) Hugo Coria	TBD	June 2007	(Argentina) Horacio Cordero	June 2007	
FAS	(Argentina) Julio Asad	TBD	June 2007	(El Salvador) Nelson Mauricio Ancheta	June 2007	
Chalatenango	(Peru) Agustin Castillo	TBD	June 2007	(El Salvador) Vladan Vicevic	July 2007	
Alianza F.C.	(Paraguay) Nelson Brizuela	TBD	June 2007	(Argentina) Pablo Centrone	July 2007	
Once Municipal	(El Salvador) Nelson Mauricio Ancheta	TBD	June 2007	(Argentina) Abel Moralejo	August 2007	

=== During the season ===
Team	Outgoing manager	Manner of departure	Date of vacancy	Replaced by	Date of appointment	Position in table
Once Municipal	(Argentina) Abel Moralejo	TBD	October 2007	(Argentina) Hugo Coria	October 2007	
San Salvador F.C.	(Uruguay) Saul Rivero	TBD	October 2007	(Colombia) Henry Vanegas	October 2007	

== Standings ==
Last updated April 5, 2008

Pos	Team	Pld	W	D	L	GF	GA	GD	Pts
1	C.D. Chalatenango	18	10	4	4	29	16	+13	34
2	C.D. FAS	18	9	3	6	27	21	+6	30
3	A.D. Isidro Metapán	18	8	5	5	31	24	+7	29
4	C.D. Luis Ángel Firpo	18	7	6	5	23	17	+6	27
5	C.D. Vista Hermosa	18	8	3	7	24	25	−1	27
6	C.D. Águila	18	7	4	7	23	20	+3	25
7	Alianza F.C.	18	6	6	6	26	28	−2	24
8	Nejapa F.C.	18	5	7	6	31	34	−3	22
9	San Salvador F.C.	18	3	6	9	20	35	−15	15
10	Once Municipal	18	4	2	12	8	22	−14	14

=== Semifinals ===
1 December 2007	Isidro Metapán	0–0	FAS	Estadio Jorge Calero Suárez

8 December 2007	FAS	1–1 (1–1 agg.)	Isidro Metapán	Estadio Oscar Quiteño

2 December 2007	Luis Ángel Firpo	2–0	Chalatenango	Estadio Sergio Torres

9 December 2007	Chalatenango	1–0 (1–2 agg.)	Luis Ángel Firpo	Estadio José Gregorio Martínez

=== Final ===
17 December 2007

Luis Ángel Firpo	1–1 (a.e.t.)	C.D. FAS
Barroche 41'		Pacheco 80'
Penalties
	5–3

Estadio Cuscatlán

Firpo
GK	(El Salvador) Juan José Gómez
DF	(El Salvador) Emerson Veliz
DF	(El Salvador) Mauricio Quintanilla
DF	(El Salvador) Edwin Gonzalez
DF	(El Salvador) Jorge Elenilson Sánchez
MF	(El Salvador) Eduardo Campos (yellow card) 50'	Substituted off
MF	(El Salvador) Guillermo Morán
MF	(El Salvador) Francisco Medrano (yellow card) 89'
MF	(Argentina) Leonardo Pekarnik (yellow card) 29'	Substituted off
FW	(Argentina) Fernando Leguizamón	Substituted off
FW	(Argentina) Patricio Barroche
Substitutes:
FW	(El Salvador) Carlos Monteagudo (yellow card) 54'	Substituted on
MF	(El Salvador) Carlos Calderón	Substituted on
MF	(Argentina) Mario Costas	Substituted on
Manager:
(Argentina) Horacio Cordero

FAS:
GK	(El Salvador) Adolfo Menéndez
DF	(El Salvador) Mardoqueo Henríquez
DF	(El Salvador) Marvin Gonzalez (yellow card) 48'
DF	(El Salvador) William Roberto Figueroa	Substituted on
DF	(El Salvador) Ramon Flores
DF	(El Salvador) Óscar Jiménez
MF	(El Salvador) Cristian Álvarez
MF	(El Salvador) Víctor Merino	Substituted on
MF	(El Salvador) Alfredo Pacheco
FW	(Argentina) Alejandro Bentos
FW	(Panama) Orlando Rodríguez
Substitutes:
DF	(El Salvador) Emerson Umaña (yellow card) 51'	Substituted on
FW	(El Salvador) Víctor Fuentes	Substituted on
FW	(El Salvador) César Larios	Substituted on
Manager:
(El Salvador) Nelson Ancheta

Apertura Champions 2007

8th title

Luis Ángel Firpo qualified for 2008–09 CONCACAF Champions League.

== Top scorers ==
Pos.	Nat.	Player	Team	Goals
1	(Honduras)	Williams Reyes	A.D. Isidro Metapán	11
2	(El Salvador)	Francisco Jovel Álvarez	Alianza F.C.	11
3	(Panama)	Nicolás Muñoz	C.D. Águila	8
4	(El Salvador)	Rudis Corrales	C.D. Águila	6
4	(Uruguay)	Paolo Suárez	A.D. Isidro Metapán	6
5	(El Salvador)	Eduardo José Retana Castro	Alianza F.C.	5
5	(Colombia)	Cristian Gil Mosquera	Vista Hermosa	5

== List of foreign players in the league ==
This is a list of foreign players in Apertura 2007. The following players:

1. have played at least one apertura game for the respective club.
2. have not been capped for the El Salvador national football team on any level, independently from the birthplace

A new rule was introduced this season that clubs can only have three foreign players per club and can only add a new player if there is an injury or player/s is released.

C.D. Águila

- (Honduras) Fabio Ulloa
- (Panama) Nicolás Muñoz
- (Brazil) Glaucio lira

Alianza F.C.

- (Mexico) Arturo Albarrán

Chalatenango

- (Panama) Anel Canales
- (Honduras) Franklin Webster
- (Brazil) Marcelo Messias
- (Colombia) Juan Camilo Mejía

C.D. FAS

- (Panama) Temistocles Perez
- (Panama) Joel Solonilla
- (Argentina) Sebastian Bini
- (Argentina) Alejandro Bentos
- (Panama) Orlando Rodriguez

C.D. Luis Ángel Firpo

- (Argentina) Patricio Barroche
- (Argentina) Fernando Leguizamón
- (Argentina) Leonardo Pekarnik
- (Argentina) Mario Alejandro Costas

(player released mid season) Injury replacement player

Nejapa FC

- (Uruguay) Juan Carlos Reyes
- (Argentina) Roberto Chanampe
- (Mexico) Jose Luis Osorio
- (Mexico) Oscar Maturin

A.D. Isidro Metapán

- (Brazil) Marcelo Messias
- (Honduras) Johnny Avila
- (Uruguay) Paolo Suarez
- (Honduras) Williams Reyes

Once Municipal

- (Panama) Francisco Portillo
- (Colombia) Jairo Hurtado
- (Honduras) Ernesto Noel Aquino
- (Colombia) Libardo Barbajal
- (Argentina) Pablo Troyano

San Salvador F.C.

- (Colombia) Alexander Obregón
- (Colombia) Andrés Medina

Vista Hermosa

- (Brazil) José Eduardo Mendez
- (Colombia) Cristian Mosquera
- (Colombia) Elder Figueroa
- (Colombia) Luis Torres Rodriguez
