= List of Club Deportivo Dragón managers =

Club Deportivo Dragón is a professional Salvadoran football club based in San Miguel, El Salvador, which plays in the Salvadoran league, Primera division. The first full-time manager for Dragon was TBD.

Jose Mario Martinez is the most successful manager in terms of trophies. He won two segunda division titles .

The second most successful Dragon manager in terms of trophies won is Omar Sevilla, who won one Primera division titles in his 2-year reign as manager.

Dragon managers since 1950 to present days. No prior records found 1933 to 1949.

== Managers ==
This is a list of head coaches of the Salvadoran football club C.D. Dragón. Since the club was formed, Dragón have had TBD coaches

Table key

- Player-coach (team player that assumed simultaneously the role of coach)
- Caretaker coach (coach who assumed temporarily the job in the absence of the incumbent head coach or until a new head coach was hired)

Period	Manager	Notes
1950–51	(El Salvador) Jorge El Choco Méndez	Won 1 Primera Division Titles 1950–51
1951–53	(El Salvador) Miguel Herrera † (-2021)	Won 1 Primera Division Titles (1953–54)
1954	(El Salvador) Armando Chacón	
1955–56	(Argentina) Gregorio Bundio † (1928–2015)	First manager from outside El Salvador
1966	(El Salvador) Membreno	
1966–1967	(El Salvador) Maximiliano Cubas † (1934–2020)	
1970	(El Salvador) Raul (Pucul) Bonilla	
1970–1971	(El Salvador) Guillermo Gutiérrez	
1972	(El Salvador) Chentino Mejia	
1974	(El Salvador) Guillermito Gutierrez	
1976–78	(Brazil) Jorge Tupinambá † (1944 – 2017)	Segunda division champion/Promoted from Second Division to first Division 1977–78 season.
1977	(El Salvador) Rene Mena	
TBD	(Argentina) Omar Muraco	
1984–85	(El Salvador) Juan Francisco Barraza † (1935–1997)	Runner Up - Segunda Division
1987–89	(El Salvador) Mario Martínez	Segunda division champion/Promoted from Second Division to first Division 1987–88 season.
1989–90	(Chile) Rolando Torino † (1929–2018)	
1993–94	(El Salvador) Juan Ramón Paredes	
1994–95	(El Salvador) Miguel Obando	
1995–1995	(El Salvador) Mario Martínez	
1996- November 1996	(Costa Rica) Didier Castro † (1946–2024)	
November 1996 - December 1996	(El Salvador) Juan Ramón Paredes	
January 1997 - September 1997	(Honduras) Gilberto Yearwood	
September 1997 - October 1997	(Honduras) Domingo Ramos Moncada + (-2020)	
November 1997 - February 1998	(Uruguay) German Barreto	
February 1998 - July 1998	(Honduras) Domingo Ramos Moncada	
July 1998 - December 1998	(El Salvador) Moses Alberto Victor Magana	
January 1999 - February 1999	(El Salvador) Saul Molina	
February 1999 - March 1999	(Honduras) Domingo Ramos Moncada (Interim) + (-2020)	
March 1999 – December 1999	(Paraguay) Nelson Brizuela	
January 2000 – March 2000	(Paraguay) Santos Claudio Gonzalez	
March 2000 - 2000	(El Salvador) Mauricio Laureano Alvarenga	
July 2000 – December 2000	(Paraguay) Nelson Brizuela	
February 2001 - September 2001	(El Salvador) Miguel Obando	
October 2001 - December 2001	(Ecuador) Alfredo Encalada	
January 2002 - May 2002	(Paraguay) Nelson Brizuela	
June 2002 - August 2002	(Brazil) Carlos Vieira	
September 2002 - March 2003	(El Salvador) Jose Mario Martínez	
April 2003 - 2003	(Honduras) Domingo Ramos Moncada (Interim)	
2003	(Honduras) Gilberto Yearwood	
January 2004 - April 2005	(El Salvador) Joaquín Pérez	
November 2005 – 2006	(El Salvador) Saúl Molina	
TBD	(El Salvador) José Efraín Núñez	
2008-2008	(El Salvador) Omar Sevilla	
2009 – October 2009	(El Salvador) Mario Martínez	
October 2009 – December 2010	(Brazil) Eduardo Santana	
2011	(El Salvador) Joaquín Pérez	
2011 – March 2012	(El Salvador) Marvin "La Perica" Benítez	
March 2012 – May 2012	(El Salvador) Abel Blanco	
June 2012 – August 2013	(El Salvador) Mario Martínez	Clausura 2013 Segunda division champion and winner of promotion play-off /Promoted from Second Division to first Division 2013–14 season.
Aug 2013 – May 2014	(El Salvador) Nelson Ancheta	Runners up in the Clausura 2014
May 2014 – February 2015	(Argentina) Roberto Gamarra	
February 2015	(El Salvador) Santos Rivera	Interim (Coached two games)
February 2015 – March 2015	(El Salvador) Guillermo Rivera	
March 2015– April 2015	(El Salvador) Santos Rivera	Interim (Coached 2 games)
April 2015– May 2015	(El Salvador) Abel Blanco	Interim (Coached 3 games)
June 2015–September 2016	(El Salvador) Omar Sevilla	Won 1 Primera Division Titles (2016 Clausura)
September 2016– February 2017	(El Salvador) Nelson Ancheta	
March 2017	(El Salvador) Víctor Coreas	
March 2017– September 2017	(Colombia) Henry Vanegas	
September 2017 – November 2017	(El Salvador) Efrain Burgos	
November 2017 – April 2018	(Colombia) Diego Pizzaro	
April 2018 – May 2018	(El Salvador) Santos Rivera	Interim (Coached 2 game)
May 2018	(El Salvador) Abel Blanco	Interim (Coached 1 game)
June 2018 – October 2018	(Uruguay) Rubén da Silva	
October 2018– December 2018	(El Salvador) Santos Rivera	Interim (Coached game)
January 2019 – November 2019	(Colombia) Henry Vanegas	
November 2019-	(El Salvador) Mario Martínez	
2020 - February 2021	(El Salvador) Juan Carlos Marjano	
February 2021- June 2021	(El Salvador) Mártir Paredes	
July 2021 - September 2021	(El Salvador) Mario Martínez	
September 2021 - December 2021	(El Salvador) Oswaldo Franco (Interim)	
January 2022 – December 2023	(El Salvador) Marvin Benítez "La Perica"	2022 Clausura Segunda division champion and winner of promotion play-off 2021-22/Promoted from Second Division to first Division 2022–23 season.
December 2023 - June 2024	(El Salvador) Manuel Acevedo	
June 2024 - September 2024	(El Salvador) Marvin Benítez "La Perica"	
September 2024 - March 2025	(Uruguay) Pablo Quiñones	
March 2025 - June 2025	(El Salvador) Manuel Meme Gonzalez	
June 2025 - December 2025	(El Salvador) Marvin Benítez "La Perica"	
January 2026 - Present	(El Salvador) Oswaldo Franco	
