= List of Liga Nacional de Fútbol de Guatemala managers =

The Liga Nacional de Fútbol is a professional football league in Guatemala which is the top tier of the Guatemala football league system.

== Managers ==
The list of managers includes everyone who has managed clubs while they were in the Liga Nacional de Fútbol, whether in a permanent or temporary role. Caretaker managers are listed only when they managed the team for at least one match in that period.

- (Argentina) Iván Sopegno - Comunicaciones
- (Argentina) Miguel Ángel Brindisi - Comunicaciones, Municipal
- (Argentina) Horacio Cordero - Comunicaciones, Municipal
- (Argentina) Carmelo Faraone - Comunicaciones
- (Argentina) Salvador Pericullo - Comunicaciones
- (Argentina) Raúl Héctor Cocherari - Comunicaciones
- (Argentina) Juan Ramón Verón - Comunicaciones
- (Argentina) Carlos Alberto de Toro - Comunicaciones
- (Argentina) José Alberto Cevasco - Municipal
- (Argentina) Enzo Trossero - Municipal
- (Argentina) Jorge Habbegger - Municipal
- (Argentina) Jorge José Benítez - Municipal
- (Argentina) Carlos Ruiz - Municipal
- (Argentina)
- (Brazil) Jaime Borja - Municipal
- (Chile) Fernando Díaz Seguel - Municipal
- (Chile) Luis Grill Prieto - Municipal
- (Costa Rica) Rónald González Brenes - Comunicaciones
- (Costa Rica) Alexandre Guimarães - Comunicaciones
- (Costa Rica) Marvin Rodríguez - Municipal
- (Costa Rica) Javier Delgado - Municipal
- (Costa Rica) Mauricio Wright - Municipal
- (Costa Rica) Hernán Medford - Municipal
- (Czech Republic) Jan Poštulka - Municipal
- (Guatemala) Federico "Chapuda" Morales - Comunicaciones
- (Guatemala) Carlos Enrique "Ronco" Wellman - Comunicaciones
- (Guatemala) Jorge "Mono" Lainfiesta - Comunicaciones
- (Guatemala) Victor Hugo Monzon - Municipal
- (Guatemala) Carlos Humberto Toledo - Municipal
- (Guatemala) Manuel Felipe Carrera - Municipal
- (Guatemala)
- (Guatemala)
- (Guatemala)
- (Honduras) Ramón Maradiaga - Municipal
- (Hungary) Ferenc Meszaros - Municipal
- (Mexico) Alberto Aguilar - Comunicaciones
- (Montenegro) Dušan Drašković - Comunicaciones
- (Paraguay) Ranulfo Miranda - Comunicaciones
- (Paraguay) (Uruguay) Ever Hugo Almeida - Municipal
- (Peru) Walter Ormeño - Comunicaciones, Municipal
- (Portugal) Guilherme Farinha - Municipal
- (Spain) José Casés Penadés - Comunicaciones
- (Uruguay) Rubén Amorín - Comunicaciones, Municipal
- (Uruguay) Carlos Miloc - Comunicaciones
- (Uruguay) Antonio Alzamendi - Comunicaciones
- (Uruguay) Luis Cubilla - Comunicaciones
- (Uruguay) Julio César Cortés - Comunicaciones
- (Uruguay) Gustavo Faral - Municipal
- (Uruguay) (Armenia) Manuel Keosseian - Municipal
- (Uruguay) Gustavo Machain - Municipal
- (Uruguay) Julio González Montemurro - Comunicaciones
- (Uruguay) William Coito Olivera - Comunicaciones
- (Uruguay) Anibal Ruiz - Municipal
