= Dennis Salinas =

Salvadoran goalkeeper (born 1986)

Deputy of the Legislative Assembly of El Salvador from San Salvador
- Incumbent
- Assumed office 1 May 2021

Personal details
- Born: Dennis Fernando Salinas Bermúdez; 23 July 1986 (age 40) San Salvador, El Salvador
- Party: Nuevas Ideas
- Occupation: Politician, footballer
Association football career
- Height: 1.85 m (6 ft 1 in)
- Position: Goalkeeper
Senior career*
Years	Team	Apps	(Gls)
2002–2007	San Salvador FC	0	(0)
2008	CD FAS	4	(0)
2008–2009	Alianza FC	16	(0)
2010	CD Atlético Balboa	18	(0)
2010–2014	CD Luis Ángel Firpo	16	(0)
2014–2016	CD Atlético Marte	53	(0)
2016–2017	AD Chalatenango	37	(0)
2018–2019	Brujos de Izalco FC		(0)
International career
2007	El Salvador	2	(0)
- * Club domestic league appearances and goals

Dennis Fernando Salinas Bermúdez (born 23 July 1986) is a Salvadoran politician and former professional goalkeeper who has served as a deputy of the Legislative Assembly of El Salvador since 2021.

== Early life ==
Dennis Fernando Salinas Bermúdez was born on 23 July 1986 in San Salvador, El Salvador.

Salinas attended the Technological University of El Salvador from 2010 to 2014 where he earned a degree in public relations.

== Football career ==
=== Club career ===
Salinas started his career at San Salvador FC and joined CD FAS for the Clausura 2008 tournament.

After only one season with CD FAS, he left them for Alianza FC and he moved to Atlético Balboa for the Clausura 2010 tournament. He also left Alianza after only one season and signed with CD Luis Ángel Firpo in 2010.

Except for his period at San Salvador FC and his short stint at Atlético Balboa he has primarily been used as a back-up goalkeeper.

Salinas won the Clausura 2013 national championship with CD Luis Ángel Firpo. Salinas started one match against Club Tijuana during the 2013–14 CONCACAF Champions League where he conceded one goal in the 1–0 loss.

Before a whole season injured he signed Atlético Marte in August 2014. With Atlético Marte, Salinas experienced an administrative crisis, arrears in salary payments and pressures from directives of the team, leading Salinas to leave the club after Atlético Marte's descent in the Clausura 2016 tournament.

Salinas signed with AD Chalatenango for the Apertura 2016, however, Salinas saw little play time and left the club in 2017.

In 2018 Salinas signed with Brujos de Izalco of Segunda División. On 1 July 2019, Salinas became a free agent and was not signed by another club.

=== International career ===
Salinas made his international debut with the El Salvador national football team in a friendly match on 22 August 2007 against Honduras, during which, El Salvador won by a score of 2–0. Salinas' second start was on 8 September against Ecuador. Salinas conceded two goals at the 13th and 29th minutes and was subsequently substituted by Juan José Gómez at the 33rd minute. El Salvador ultimately lost by a score of 5–1.

== Political career ==
From 2015 to 2019, Salinas worked for the municipal government of San Salvador as a violence prevention technician where he promoted the development of sporting activities. From 2019 to 2020, Salinas was the manager of juvenile attention for the Ministry of Justice and Public Security where he continued to promote youth sports as a crime prevention tactic.

In 2021, Salinas was elected as a deputy of the Legislative Assembly of El Salvador as a member of the Nuevas Ideas political party from the San Salvador Department. He received 72,818 election marks, the fourth most of any candidate in San Salvador. His supplement deputy was Julio César Marroquín. He was a member of both the justice and human rights commission and the public security and combatting narco-activity commission. Salinas supported President Nayib Bukele and promised to give Bukele "governability" ("gobernabilidad") in the Legislative Assembly.

He was re-elected as a deputy of the Legislative Assembly in 2024 with 120,986 election marks. He is a member of the national security and justice committee.

== Career statistics ==
=== International ===
Appearances and goals by national team, year, and competition
Team	Year	Competitive		Friendly		Total	
Team	Year	Apps	Goals	Apps	Goals	Apps	Goals
El Salvador	2007	2	0	0	0	2	0

== Electoral history ==
The following table displays Salinas' electoral record.

Year	Office	Type	Party	Main opponent	Party	Votes for Salinas				Result	Swing
Year	Office	Type	Party	Main opponent	Party	Total	%	P.	±%	Result	Swing
2021	Deputy of the Legislative Assembly	General	NI	N/A		72,818	N/A	4th	N/A	Won	Gain
2024	Deputy of the Legislative Assembly	General	NI	N/A		120,986	N/A	10th	N/A	Won	Hold
