= Roberto Gamarra (football manager) =

Argentine footballer

Personal information
- Full name: Roberto Gamarra
- Date of birth: March 6, 1958 (age 68)
- Place of birth: Argentina
- Position: Striker

Senior career*
Years	Team	Apps	(Gls)
1979–1980	Cerro Porteño		
1984	Sportivo Luqueño		
1985–1986	Cerro Porteño		

Managerial career
- 2000: León de Huánuco
- 2001: Santa Fe
- 2002–2003: Sportivo Luqueño
- 2005–2006: Once Lobos
- 2007–2009: Atlético Balboa
- 2009–2010: FAS
- 2010: Atlético Balboa
- 2011: Alianza
- 2012: UES
- 2013: Luis Ángel Firpo
- 2014–2015: Dragón
- 2015: Universidad SC
- 2016: FAS
- 2017: Isidro Metapán
- 2018: LDU Loja
- 2020–2021: Luis Ángel Firpo
- 2022: Quiché FC
- 2024: Santa Lucía Cotzumalguapa
- 2025: Guaireña F.C.
- 2026-: Chichicasteco FC
- * Club domestic league appearances and goals

Roberto Gamarra (born 6 March 1958) is a former Argentine and naturalised Paraguayan professional football midfielder and currently manager of Chichicasteco FC .

After retiring as a player he coached teams in El Salvador.

== Coaching career ==
=== Once Lobos ===
In 2005, Gamarra signed as new coach of Once Lobos, replacing Genaro Sermeño.

=== Atlético Balboa ===
In 2007, he signed as new coach of Atlético Balboa, replacing Gustavo de Simone. In January 2009, Gamarra was replaced by Carlos Alberto de Toro.

=== FAS ===
In January 2009, he was appointed as new coach of C.D. FAS. In 2010, Gamarra was replaced by Alberto Rujana.

=== Alianza FC ===
In March 2011, Gamarra was appointed as new coach of Alianza F.C., replacing Miloš Miljanić.

=== UES ===
In January 2012, Gamarra signed as new coach of UES, replacing Jorge Abrego. In September 2013, Gamarra was replaced by Ramiro Cepeda.

=== Luis Ángel Firpo ===
In March 2013, he was appointed as new coach of C.D. Luis Ángel Firpo, replacing Edgar Henríquez.

=== Dragón ===
In May 2014, Gamarra signed as new coach of C.D. Dragón, replacing Nelson Mauricio Ancheta. In February 2015, Gamarra was replaced by Santos Rivera.

=== Return to FAS ===
In March 2016, Gamarra was appointed as coach of FAS, replacing Carlos Martínez. In May 2016, Gamarra was replaced by Osvaldo Escudero.

=== Isidro Metapán ===
In December 2016, Gamarra was appointed as new coach of A.D. Isidro Metapán. In April 2017, Gamarra was replaced by assistant coach Álvaro Misael Alfaro.

=== L.D.U. Loja ===
In 2018, he signed with L.D.U. Loja.

== Honours ==
=== Club ===
C.D. FAS

- Primera División
  - Champion: Apertura 2009

Alianza F.C.

- Primera División
  - Champion: Clausura 2011

C.D. Luis Ángel Firpo

- Primera División
  - Champion: Clausura 2013
