= Victor Fuentes =

Victor or Víctor Fuentes may refer to:

- Vic Fuentes (Victor Vincent Fuentes, born 1983), American musician
- Víctor Fuentes (Chilean footballer) (born 1972), Chilean football manager and former defender
- Víctor Fuentes (Salvadoran footballer) (born 1978), Salvadoran former football defender
