= Selvin Zelaya =

Salvadorian footballer (born 1979)

Personal information
- Full name: Luis Selvin Zelaya Bran
- Date of birth: March 1, 1979 (age 47)
- Place of birth: Usulután, El Salvador
- Height: 1.68 m (5 ft 6 in)
- Position: Midfielder

Team information
- Current team: Aspirante

Youth career
- 1996–2001: C.D. El Vencedor

Senior career*
Years	Team	Apps	(Gls)
1998	Topiltzín		
2002–2004	Municipal Limeño		
2005–2006	Atlético Balboa		
2006–2008	Águila		
2008–2010	Atlético Balboa	42	(3)
2011–present	Aspirante		

International career^{‡}
2006	El Salvador	1	(0)
- * Club domestic league appearances and goals as of 20 January 2011 ‡ National team caps and goals as of 20 January 2011

Luis Selvin Zelaya Bran (born 1 March 1979 in Usulután, El Salvador) is a Salvadoran professional football player, who currently plays for Aspirante in the Salvadoran second division.

== Club career ==
Zelaya has played professionally in the Primera División de Fútbol de El Salvador for Municipal Limeño, Atlético Balboa and joined Salvadoran top team Águila in 2006. He returned to Balboa 2 years later.

== International career ==
Zelaya made his debut for El Salvador in a September 2006 friendly match against Honduras, coming on as a second half substitute for Marvin González. The game proved to be his one and only international match.
