= Bernard Mullins =

Costa Rican footballer (born 1973)

Personal information
- Full name: Bernard Mullins Campbell
- Date of birth: December 5, 1973 (age 52)
- Place of birth: Cartago, Costa Rica
- Height: 1.72 m (5 ft 7 1/2 in)
- Position: Forward

Youth career
- Herediano

Senior career*
Years	Team	Apps	(Gls)
1992–1995	Cartaginés		
1995–1997	Alajuelense		
1997–1999	Cartaginés		
1999	USAC	22	(12)
2000–2001	Herediano		
2001–2002	Liberia		
2002	Guanacasteca		
2003	Carmelita		
2003–2005	Cartaginés		
2005	FAS		(1)
2005–2007	Cartaginés		
2007–2008	UCR	15	(2)
2008	Cartaginés	7	(0)

International career
1997–1998	Costa Rica	3	(0)
- * Club domestic league appearances and goals

Bernard Mullins Campbell, also known as Bérnal Mullins, (born December 5, 1973) is a Costa Rican former football striker.

== Club career ==
Nicknamed La Dinamita, Mullins started his career with Cartaginés before joining Alajuelense in 1995 and returning to Cartaginés two years later. He had a stint on loan in Guatemalan football with USAC in 1999 amid controversy about a fee the Guatemalans had to pay Cartaginés for the loan. In January 2000, he returned to Costa Rica to play for Herediano.

In May 2005, Mullins moved abroad to play for Salvadoran outfit FAS, with whom he won the 2005 league title a month later.

Mullins denied reports of a possible retirement in November 2008, citing he would love to play on for Cartaginés. He eventually retired in 2008 and was given a farewell match in October 2009. In 2007, he was joint Costa Rican record holder in having served seven different Costa Rican clubs.

== International career ==
Mullins made his debut for Costa Rica in a November 1997 FIFA World Cup qualification match against Canada and earned a total of 3 caps, scoring no goals. He represented his country in 1 FIFA World Cup qualification match and played at the 1998 CONCACAF Gold Cup.

His final international was a February 1998 CONCACAF Gold Cup match against the United States.

=== Personal Achievement ===
Mullins is rated in the top 20 goalscorers in the first division of Costa Rica with 110 goals.

== Managerial career ==
After retiring as a player, Mullins became assistant coach at Cartaginés.
