= Carlos Alberto Mijangos =

Guatemalan footballer

Personal information
- Full name: Carlos Alberto Mijangos Castro
- Date of birth: 19 August 1951 (age 75)
- Place of birth: Guatemala City, Guatemala
- Position: Midfielder

Senior career*
Years	Team	Apps	(Gls)
1969–1974	Juventud Retalteca		
1974–1975	Zacapa		
1975–1978	Platense		
1978–1979	Chalatenango		
1979–1982	Municipal		(21)
1982–1984	Motagua		
1984–1986	Xelajú		
1987–1988	Tulsa Roughnecks		
1988–1990	Cobán Imperial		

International career
	Guatemala	5	(?)

Managerial career
- 1998: Aurora
- 2004: Tipografía Nacional
- 2005: Chalatenango
- 2006: Deportivo San Pedro
- 2010: Atlético Balboa
- 2010: Águila
- 2012–2013: Juventud Retalteca
- 2013: Deportivo Reu
- 2017: Chalatenango
- * Club domestic league appearances and goals

Carlos Alberto Mijangos Castro (born 19 August 1951) is a Guatemalan professional former footballer and manager.

== Club career ==
Nicknamed "El Comanche", Mijangos played for locals sides Juventud Retalteca, Club Xelajú MC, Deportivo Zacapa, C.S.D. Municipal and Cobán Imperial.

He also played in the 1970s in El Salvador for Platense and Chalatenango, and won promotion with the latter to the Primera División de Fútbol de El Salvador in 1979.

In Honduras he played for F.C. Motagua and in the United States for Tulsa Roughnecks.

In 1982, he almost lost a leg due to infection.

== Managerial career ==
After retiring, Mijangos went into management and managed Aurora, Escuintla, Xelajú, Juventud Retalteca, Sacachispas, Coatepeque, Ayutla, C.D. Jalapa, Chimaltenango, San Marcos, Universidad, Deportivo Malacateco and Rosario.

In 2004, he was in charge of Tipografía Nacional in Guatemala's third division.

He then returned in 2005 to El Salvador to coach Chalatenango where he was dismissed in September 2005 and later became in charge of Guatemala Second Division side Deportivo San Pedro.

In December 2009 joined Atlético Balboa.

In 2017, he returned to Chalatenango, but, problems with the team's directive caused that Mijangos was not confirmed until 8 April.
