= Carlos Asprilla =

Colombian footballer (born 1970)

Personal information
- Full name: Carlos Fernando Asprilla Mosquera
- Date of birth: October 19, 1970 (age 56)
- Place of birth: Zarzal, Colombia
- Height: 5 ft 11 in (1.80 m)
- Position: Defender

Senior career*
Years	Team	Apps	(Gls)
1990	América de Cali		
1993	Unión Magdalena		
1993–1996	Unión de Santa Fe		
1996–1997	América de Cali		
1998–1999	Independiente Medellín		
2000	Deportivo Cali		
2001	Junior de Barranquilla		
2001	Millonarios		
2002	Atlético Bucaramanga	10	(0)
2002–2003	Herediano		
2003	Aucas		
2003–2004	Atlético Balboa		
2005–2006	Deportes La Serena		

International career^{‡}
1997–2000	Colombia	10	(0)
- * Club domestic league appearances and goals as of November 2010 ‡ National team caps and goals as of November 2010

Carlos Fernando Asprilla Mosquera (born 19 October 1970) is a Colombian football player who started his professional career with Independiente Medellín.

== Club career ==
One of Colombia's best defensive players during the mid-late 1990s, he also played for América de Cali.

== Personal life ==
He's a cousin of former Colombian player Faustino Asprilla. He has three kids, first son Christopher Asprilla born in April, whom currently lives in Spain. Carlo's Second oldest daughter, Valentina Asprilla, her birthday is on May 8, 1997, she lives in The United States with her mother—Carlos's first Wife. youngest daughter Sara Sofia Asprilla, whom lives in Cali Colombia with Carlo's second wife.
