= Garabet Avedissian =

Uruguayan football manager

Personal information
- Full name: Carlos Garabet Avedissian
- Date of birth: 7 June 1959 (age 67)
- Place of birth: Montevideo, Uruguay

International career
Years	Team	Apps	(Gls)
- Uruguay

Managerial career
- 1998: Limón F.C.
- 2000–2001: FAS
- 2002: Atlético Balboa
- 2009: Deportivo Xinabajul
- 2010–2011: Cobán Imperial
- 2012: Deportivo Mictlán
- 2014: Costa Rica Women (under 20)
- 2015–2016: Puerto Rico
- 2017: Sonsonate

Carlos Garabet Avedissian (born 7 June 1959) is a Uruguayan football manager.

== Coaching career ==
=== FAS ===
In November 2000, Avedissian signed with FAS of the top flight Primera División for the Apertura 2000, replacing Roberto Abrussezze. He left the club in April 2001, being replaced by Rubén Guevara.

=== Atlético Balboa ===
Avedissian signed with Atlético Balboa for the Apertura 2003.

=== Sonsonate ===
In May 2017, he signed as new coach of Sonsonate for the Apertura 2017, replacing Eraldo Correia. In August 2017, he left the club after a 0–1 defeat against Pasaquina and was replaced by Rubén Alonso.
