= Cristian Álvarez (Salvadoran footballer) =

Salvadoran footballer and manager (born 1978)

Personal information
- Full name: Cristian Edgardo Álvarez Cruz
- Date of birth: 19 April 1978 (age 48)
- Place of birth: Santa Ana, El Salvador
- Height: 1.61 m (5 ft 3 in)
- Position: Midfielder

Youth career
- 1994: FAS reserves

Senior career*
Years	Team	Apps	(Gls)
1995–2000	FAS		
1999–2000	→ Espinho (loan)		
2000–2001	Dragón		
2001–2015	FAS		

International career
2000–2006	El Salvador	16	(0)

Managerial career
- 2016: Juventud Candelareño
- 2017–2018: FAS
- 2018: FAS (U17)
- * Club domestic league appearances and goals

Cristian Edgardo Álvarez Cruz (born 19 April 1978) is a Salvadoran football manager and former player.

== Club career ==
Álvarez came through the youth system at C.D. FAS and signed professional terms with them in 1995.

In 1999, he joined Portuguese Second Division club Espinho on loan, but returned to El Salvador after only one season for play with C.D. Dragón.

In 2001, Álvarez rejoined C.D. FAS.

== International career ==
Álvarez made his debut for El Salvador in an October 2000 FIFA World Cup qualification match against St Vincent & the Grenadines and has earned a total of 17 caps, scoring no goals.

He has represented his country in 3 FIFA World Cup qualification matches and played at the 2001 and 2005 UNCAF Cups.

His final international game was a November 2006 friendly match against Panama.

== Honours ==
=== Player ===
FAS

- Primera División
  - Champion: Clausura 2002, Apertura 2002, Apertura 2003, Apertura 2004, Clausura 2005, Apertura 2009
  - Runners-up: Clausura 1999, Clausura 2004, Clausura 2006, Apertura 2006, Apertura 2007, Clausura 2008, Clausura 2011, Clausura 2013, Apertura 2013
