= Saúl Rivero =

Uruguayan footballer and manager (1954–2022)

Personal information
- Full name: Saúl Lorenzo Rivero Rocha
- Date of birth: 23 July 1954
- Place of birth: Montevideo, Uruguay
- Date of death: 2 July 2022 (aged 67)
- Position: Midfielder

Senior career*
Years	Team	Apps	(Gls)
1971–1975	Liverpool de Montevideo		
1975–1977	Atlético Español	31	(10)
1977	Peñarol		
1977–1980	Atlético Español	89	(15)
1981–1982	Peñarol		
1983	River Plate Montevideo		
1984–1985	Liverpool de Montevideo		
1986	Wollongong Wolves	7	(4)

International career
1974–1976	Uruguay	9	(0)

Managerial career
- 1987–1988: Nacional
- 1988–1989: Progreso
- 1989–1990: The Strongest
- 1991: Nacional Madeira
- 1996–1997: FAS
- 1998–2002: Águila
- 2006: Progreso
- 2002–2004: Isidro Metapán
- 2004: San Salvador
- 2004–2005: Luis Ángel Firpo
- 2006–2008: San Salvador
- 2009: Frontera Rivera Fútbol Club
- 2010: Uruguay Montevideo
- 2011–2013: Torque
- 2013: Xelajú
- * Club domestic league appearances and goals

Saúl Lorenzo Rivero Rocha (23 July 1954 – 2 July 2022) was a Uruguayan football player and manager, who played as a midfielder.

== International career ==
Rivero made nine appearances for the Uruguay national team from 1974 to 1976.

== Death ==
Rivero died on 3 July 2022, at the age of 67.

== Honours ==
=== As a player ===
Peñarol

- Uruguayan Primera División: 1982
- Copa Libertadores: 1982
- Intercontinental Cup: 1982

=== As a coach ===
Progreso

- Primera División: 1989

FAS

- Primera Division: 1994–95, 1995–96

Aguila

- Primera Division: Clausura 2001

== Managerial statistics ==
Team	From	To	Record				
Team	From	To	G	W	D	L	Win %
FAS	1995	January 1997	81	43	21	17	53%
TBD							
