= Chepe Martínez =

Salvadoran footballer (born 1979)

Personal information
- Full name: José Orlando Martínez Peña
- Date of birth: September 30, 1979 (age 47)
- Place of birth: San Salvador, El Salvador
- Height: 1.77 m (5 ft 9 1/2 in)
- Positions: Midfielder; striker

Youth career
- Instituto Nacional de Apopa

Senior career*
Years	Team	Apps	(Gls)
2000–2002	Atlético Marte		
2002–2003	San Salvador F.C.		
2003–2006	Luis Ángel Firpo		
2007–2009	Alianza		
2009–2010	Atlético Marte		

International career^{‡}
2004–2008	El Salvador	27	(2)

Managerial career
- 2016: Alianza (Fitness coach)
- 2025-Present: El Salvador (Under 17) (Fitness coach)
- 2025-Present: Inter FA (Under 15)
- * Club domestic league appearances and goals as of January 2007 ‡ National team caps and goals as of February 2007

José Orlando "Chepe" Martínez Peña (born September 30, 1979 in El Salvador) is a retired Salvadoran football player, who most prominently played as a forward for Luis Ángel Firpo.

== Club career ==
Nicknamed Chepe, Martínez came through the Instituto Nacional de Apopa to earn himself a contract with Atlético Marte in 2000. He then had a short spell at San Salvador F.C. before joining Luis Ángel Firpo with whom he spent a couple of years. In 2007, he moved to Alianza, only for him to return to Marte two years later.

In 2010, he apparently finished his career to take up cycling, but in 2011 he took up coaching youth players.

== International career ==
Martínez made his debut for El Salvador in a March 2004 friendly match against Guatemala and has earned a total of 27 caps, scoring 2 goals. He has represented his country in 7 FIFA World Cup qualification matches and played at the 2007 UNCAF Nations Cup as well as at the 2007 CONCACAF Gold Cup.

His final international game was a July 2008 friendly match against Guatemala.

=== International goals ===
Scores and results list El Salvador's goal tally first.

#	Date	Venue	Opponent	Score	Result	Competition
1	12 May 2004	Robertson Stadium, Houston, United States	Haiti	3-2	3-3	Friendly match
2	13 June 2004	Estadio Cuscatlán, San Salvador, El Salvador	Bermuda	1-0	2-1	2006 FIFA World Cup qualification
