= Atlético Balboa =

Association football club in El Salvador

- Full name: Club Deportivo Atlético Balboa
- Nicknames: Los Porteños, La Ciclón
- Founded: 1950
- Ground: Estadio Marcelino Imbers, La Unión, El Salvador
- Capacity: 4,000
- Chairman: (El Salvador) Kevin Rubio
- Manager: (El Salvador) Carlos Romero
- League: (El Salvador) Segunda División
Home colours	Away colours	Third colours

Club Deportivo Atlético Balboa, commonly known as Atlético Balboa or simply Balboa, is a Salvadoran football club. The team play in La Unión, La Unión department.

== History ==
=== Foundation ===
The foundation of Atletico Balboa occurred in 1950 in La Union. Mauro "El Turco" Granados, Simón Reyes, Paulino Cáceres, Pablo Rubio, Rodolfo Guzmán, Carlos Villalta, Carlos Juárez, René Pantoja, Luis Ávila, Chico Osorio, Juan Guevara, Chico Ruíz and Timoteo Hernández were the original members of the team. The team was intended to be a baseball team, but it was changed to a football team. The club was named "Balboa" after the Panamanian balboa and its first match was played against the Honduran team América de Choluteca. The team's first colours were white with green diagonal stripes which were soon changed by the team's president Ricardo Flores to black and red.

=== Primera División ===
After becoming champions of the Segunda División in 1998, Atlético Balboa ascended to the Salvadoran Primera División where in their first season they finished runner-up while being coached by Mario Martínez and Óscar Benítez. The team's player lineup that season included Franklin Webster and Elvis Perreira.

=== Irregular way ===
The team's results and goal count declined between 1999 and 2001. During this time the team was coached by Óscar Benítez, Saúl Molina and Juan Quarterone. Luciano Suárez, Manuel Díaz, Camilo Bonilla and Carlos Edgar Villareal played for Balboa in this period.

=== Days of crisis ===
The team had just started the 2002–2003 season when the team ran into economic and performance problems. Juan Quarterone was replaced by the Paraguayan Nelson Brizuela. Under Brizuela, the team was only able to achieve 3 draws from 6 games. Brizuela was soon replaced by Argentine-Italian Carlos Barone whose team's last four games almost got them relegated but in the end Dragón had a poorer record. Atlético Balboa purchased many foreign players during the season but the only successful one was the Colombian Carlos Asprilla. Webster, the highest scoring player from the team was sold to San Salvador F.C. The club then changed its coach several times during the 2003–2004 season, with Costa Rican Manuel Solano, Gabriel Avedissian and Paulo Roberto de Oliveira serving as coach at various points in time. These coaches, except for assistant coach Jesús Fuentes, all failed to produce a high number of wins.

=== Almost glory ===
After the events of 2002–2004 season, Balboa advanced in the rankings of the Primera División. The team finished in second place in the 2006-2007 while being coached by Juan Quarterone and Jorge Alberto García. Then, the tension between the board and the two coaches divided the club. The team, including Colombian player Henry Vargas did not participate in the UNCAF tournament due to losing a playoff to C.D. Luis Ángel Firpo. However the next season Atlético Balboa was relegated from the Primera División when they lost to C.D. Vista Hermosa.

=== Current history ===
The club was promoted to the Salvadoran Primera División again after defeating Juventud Independiente in the 2008 season. Two years of moderate success followed under Guatemalan coach Carlos Alberto Mijangos and Argentine coach Roberto Gamarra, during which the team came close to entering the finals series in both seasons. However, financial problems appeared again and after two subsequent years of debt, the club was demoted to the Second Division in the 2011 season. It then disbanded and played its last game in 2011.

After 10 years, It was announced the club would be returning to the third division and professional football.

On June 18, 2024 Atletico Balboa announced due to lack of financial support the club would be selling their spot in the Segunda Division.

In June 2025, The club returned to the Segunda Division for the Apertura 2025 season, under the leadership of newly hired manager Carlos Romero. Atletico Balboa finished forth in the regular season standing before defeating Fuerte Aguilares 4–2 on aggregate and Batanecos 3–2 on aggreate. They reached the final against Dragon, which they won 2-1 thanks to a double by Colombian Miguel Murillo.

On 18th of June, 2026 Atletico Balboa announced they had made a mutual agreement to purchase Hércules spot in the Primera Division. They just waiting for FESFUT to approve the transfer of spot

On July 6, 2026 FESFUT approved the purchase of Atletico Balboa from Hércules so long Atletico Balboa meets the leage pre-requisites

== Honours ==
=== League ===
- Primera División Salvadorean and predecessors
  - Runners-up (1): Apertura 2004
- Segunda División Salvadorean and predecessors
  - Champions (3): 2000, 2008, Apertura 2025
  - Promotion Play-off Runners up (1): 2025-2026

=== Cups ===
- Copa Presidente and predecessors
  - Champions (1): 2006

== Sponsorship ==
Companies that Atletico Balboa currently has sponsorship deals with for 2026–2027 includes:

- (El Salvador) Mimagen Sport – Official kit suppliers
- (El Salvador) CAMSEB – Official sponsors
- (El Salvador) Alcadia de La Union Sur – Official sponsors
- (Mexico) Electrolit – Official sponsors
- (El Salvador) Pupuseria Marthita – Official sponsors
- (El Salvador) Agua Envasada Palmeras del Golfo – Official sponsors
- (El Salvador) TBD – Official sponsors

=== List of Kit sponsprship ===
Period	Company
1986	(United States) Pony
1996	Nil
2000	(El Salvador) Milan
2004	(South Korea) Fila
2025–2026	(Honduras) Huriver
2026–present	(El Salvador) Mimagen Sport

== Current squad ==
Updated August 16, 2026. Note: Flags indicate national team as defined under FIFA eligibility rules; some limited exceptions apply. Players may hold more than one non-FIFA nationality.

No.	Pos.	Nation	Player
2	DF	ESA	William Molina
3	DF	ESA	Mauricio Cuellar
5	DF	ESA	Juan Benitez
6	MF	ESA	Gil Sanchez
7	MF	ESA	Juan Jose Hernandez
8	MF	ESA	Orlando Martinez
9	FW	COL	Yerson Tobar
10	FW	ESA	Edgar Cruz
11	FW	COL	Victor Landazuri
12	MF	ESA	Juan Carlos Hernandez
13	GK	ESA	Daniel Arroyo
14	MF	COL	Ronaldo Royero
15	DF	ESA	Ariel Romero
16	MF	ESA	Anthony Diaz
17	MF	ESA	Gabriel Alvarez

No.	Pos.	Nation	Player
19	FW	COL	Gilberth Parra
20	MF	ESA	Saul Cabrera
21	MF	COL	Jean Rentería
22	GK	ESA	Alcides Gomez
23	FW	ESA	Nelson Moreno
24	DF	ESA	Alexander Rodriguez
26	DF	ESA	Mario Martinez
27	DF	ESA	Bayron Lopez
28	MF	ESA	Álvaro Lizama
30	MF	ESA	Rodolfo Orellana
31	MF	ESA	Angel Reyes
32	MF	ESA	Jefferson Diaz
36	MF	ESA	Franklin Villatoro
37	DF	ESA	Ronaldo Cabrera
38	MF	ESA	Jose Canales

=== Players with dual citizenship ===
- (El Salvador) (United States) TBD

=== In ===
Note: Flags indicate national team as defined under FIFA eligibility rules; some limited exceptions apply. Players may hold more than one non-FIFA nationality.

No.	Pos.	Nation	Player
—		COL	Yerson Tobar (From Dragon)
—		ESA	Alex Rodriguez (From Fuerte San Francisco)
—		ESA	Saul Cabrera (From Fuerte Aguilares)
—		ESA	Bayron Lopez (From Hércules)
—		ESA	Óscar Daniel Arroyo (From Platense)
—		ESA	Mauricio Cuellar (From Zacatecoluca)
—		ESA	GIL Sanchez (From Batanecos)

No.	Pos.	Nation	Player
—		ESA	Juan Jose Hernandez (From TBD)
—		ESA	Mario Martinez (From Hércules)
—		COL	Victor Landazuri (Loaned From Nacional FC)
—		COL	Gilberth Parra (From TBD)
—		COL	Ronaldo Royero (From Atletico F.C.)
—		COL	Jean Aldair Rentería (From TBD)

=== Out ===
Note: Flags indicate national team as defined under FIFA eligibility rules; some limited exceptions apply. Players may hold more than one non-FIFA nationality.

No.	Pos.	Nation	Player
—		ESA	Juan Benitez (To Fuerte San Francisco)
—		ESA	Jose Aguilar (To Nacional FC)
—		ESA	Osmaro Orellana (To Nacional FC)
—	FW	COL	Manuel Murillo (To TBD)

No.	Pos.	Nation	Player
—		ESA	TBD (To TBD)
—		ESA	TBD (To TBD)
—		ESA	TBD (To TBD)

== Coaching staff ==
As of September, 2026

Position	Staff
Manager	(Paraguay) Roberto Gamarra
Assistant Manager	(El Salvador) TBD
Reserve Manager	(El Salvador) TBD
Ladies's Manager	(El Salvador) TBD
Physical coach	(El Salvador) TBD
Assistant Physical coach	(El Salvador) TBD
Goalkeeper Coach	(El Salvador) TBD
Kineslogic	(El Salvador) TBD
Utility Equipment	(El Salvador) TBD
Football director	(El Salvador) TBD
Team Doctor	(El Salvador) TBD

== Notable players ==
=== Team captains ===
Name	Years
(El Salvador) Mario Marconi Burro	TBD
(El Salvador) Carlos Rivas	1979
(El Salvador) Domingo Escobar	1986
(El Salvador) Carlos Antonio Meléndez	1991
(El Salvador) Manrique Vargas Romero	1996
(El Salvador) TBD	2000
(El Salvador) Daniel Sagastizado	2001
(El Salvador) Armando Mercado	2004
(El Salvador) Jefrey Francisco Cruz	2022
(El Salvador) Francisco Valladarez	2023-2024
Hiatus	2024-2025
(El Salvador) Gabriel Alvarez	2025-Present

== Notable Players Atletico Balboa ==
Players marked in bold gained their caps while playing at Atletico Balboa.

- (El Salvador)
- (El Salvador)
- (El Salvador)
- (Honduras) Ernesto Aquino
- (Honduras) Franklin Webster (all time goalscorer)
- (Colombia) Juan Carlos Mosquera Pérez
- (Colombia) Luis Carlos Asprilla (top goalscorer 2003 season)

=== Internationals who have played at Atletico Balboa ===
Players marked in bold gained their caps while playing at Atletico Balboa.

- (El Salvador) Alexander Campos
- (El Salvador) (Brazil) Nildeson
- (El Salvador) (Uruguay) Washington de la Cruz
- (El Salvador) (Uruguay) Jorge Garay
- (El Salvador) Daniel Sagastizado
- (El Salvador) Yuvini Salamanca
- (El Salvador) **Alexander Pinto**
- (El Salvador) **Carlos Alberto López**
- (El Salvador) Héctor Antonio Morales
- (El Salvador) Mario Deras
- (El Salvador) Reynaldo Argueta
- (El Salvador) **Marvin Benítez**
- (El Salvador) Martín Paredes
- (El Salvador) **Roberto Ochoa**
- (El Salvador) **José René Galán**
- (El Salvador) **Francisco Abimael Ramirez**
- (El Salvador) Marlon Medrano
- (El Salvador) Magdonio Corrales
- (El Salvador) Mario Siguenza
- (El Salvador) Víctor Fuentes
- (El Salvador) **José Manuel Martínez**
- (El Salvador) Selvin Zelaya
- (El Salvador) José Abraham Monterrosa
- (El Salvador) Elmer Martínez
- (El Salvador) Cristián Bautista
- (El Salvador) **Víctor Turcios**
- (El Salvador) René Edgardo Peñate
- (El Salvador) José Nelson Reyes
- (El Salvador) Salvador Coreas
- (El Salvador) Gustavo Alonso López
- (El Salvador) Nelson Nerio
- (El Salvador) Luis Miguel Hernández
- (El Salvador) Isaac Zelaya
- (El Salvador) (Uruguay) Cristian Esnal
- (El Salvador) (Colombia) Elder Figueroa
- (El Salvador) Otoniel Carranza
- (El Salvador) Misael Alfaro
- (El Salvador) Juan Alberto Díaz
- (El Salvador) Josué Galdámez
- (El Salvador) René Ramos
- (El Salvador) Dennis Salinas
- (El Salvador) Manfredi Portillo
- (El Salvador) Julio Castro
- (El Salvador) Henry Hernández
- (El Salvador) Rommel Mejia
- (El Salvador) Carlos Antonio Meléndez
- (Paraguay) Nestor Ayala
- (Honduras) Camilo Bonilla
- (Colombia) Carlos Asprilla

== List of presidents ==
- Ricardo Flores
- Juan Pablo Robles (2003)
- Noel Benítez (2004, 2006–2007)
- Mario Sorto (2005)
- Andrés Alonso Gómez (2007–2008)
- Juan Pablo Robles (2009–2011)
- Kevin Rubio (2021–2024)
- Francisco Cruz Martínez (2025-Present)

== List of coaches ==
Name	From	To
(El Salvador) Salvador Churrillo Rivas	1979	1979
(El Salvador) Juan Evangelista Zelaya	1981	1981
(El Salvador) Francisco Jovel	1985	1985
(El Salvador) Jose Mario Martínez	1990	1990
(El Salvador) Salvador Reyes	1996	1996
(El Salvador) Jose Mario Martínez	1998	February 2001
(El Salvador) Óscar Benítez	February 2001	October 2001
(El Salvador) Saúl Molina	November 2001	December 2001
(Argentina) Juan Quarterone	January 2002	December 2002
(Paraguay) Nelson Brizuela	January 2003	April 2003
(Argentina) (Italy) Carlos Barone	April 2003	April 2003
(Uruguay) Carlos Garabet Avedissian	June 2003	August 2003
(Costa Rica) Manuel Alberto Solano Madrigal	September 2003	December 2003
(Brazil) Paulo Roberto de Oliveira	December 2003	December 2003
(El Salvador) Jesus Fuentes	December 2003	January 2004
(El Salvador) Óscar Benítez	January 2004	June 2004
(Argentina) Jorge García	June 2004	October 2004
(Argentina) Juan Quarterone	October 2004	January 2005
(Colombia) Henry Vanegas	February 2005	September 2005
(Argentina) Jorge García	September 2005	December 2005
(El Salvador) Nelson Ancheta	January 2006	2006
(Argentina) Jorge García	2006	2007
(El Salvador) Fausto Omar Vásquez	2008	June 2008
(Uruguay) Gustavo de Simone	25 July 2008	30 Aug 2008
(Paraguay) Roberto Gamarra	2007	Jan 2009
(Argentina) Carlos de Toro	21 Jan 2009	Feb 2009
(El Salvador) Luis Zapata	Feb 2009	June 2009
(Brazil) Eduardo Santana	June 2009	Aug 2009
(El Salvador) Angel Orellana	Aug 2009	Sep 2009
(Argentina) Jorge García	Sep 2009	Sep 2009
(El Salvador) Luis Zapata	Sep 2009	Dec 2009
(Guatemala) Carlos Mijangos	Jan 2010	June 2010
(Paraguay) Roberto Gamarra	June 2010	December 2010
(El Salvador) Mario Martínez	December 2010	June 2011
Hiatus	July 2011	June 2021
(Colombia) Luis Carlos Asprilla	July 2021	February 2022
(El Salvador) William Cheves	February 2022	February 2022
(Paraguay) Roberto Gamarra	February 2022	May 2022
(El Salvador) Omar Sevilla	May 2022	November 2022
(Colombia) Luis Carlos Asprilla	November 2022	December 12, 2022
(El Salvador) Misael Alfaro	December 13, 2022	October 11, 2023
(El Salvador) David Paz	October, 2023	May 2024
Hiatus	June 2024	June 2025
(El Salvador) Carlos Romero	June 2025	September 2026
(Paraguay) Roberto Gamarra	September 2026	Present

=== Notable managers ===
The following managers have won at least one trophy while in charge at Atletico Balboa:

Name	Nationality	From	To	Honours
José Mario Martínez	El Salvador	1 June 1998	1 February 2001	1 Segunda División Salvadorean (1999–2000)
Fausto Omar Vásquez	El Salvador	1 January 2008	1 June 2008	1 Segunda División Salvadorean (2008)
Jorge García	Argentina	1 June 2006	1 June 2007	1 Copa Presidente (2006)
Carlos Romero	El Salvador	1 June 2025	9 September 2026	1 Segunda División Salvadorean (2025 Apertura)

== Records ==
=== Most appearances ===
No.	Player	period	Appearances
1	(El Salvador) TBD	TBD-TBD	71
2	(El Salvador) TBD	TBD-TBD	71
3	(El Salvador) Yuvini Salamanca	2004–2005; 2007–2010	94
4	(El Salvador) Adan Reyes	2007–2010	92
5	(El Salvador) TBD	TBD-TBD	71

=== Most Goals ===
No.	Player	Period	Goals
1	(Honduras) Franklin Webster	2000–2002, 2005, 2008–2009, 2011–2012	77
2	(El Salvador) Alexander Campos	2010–2011	14
3	(Colombia) Luis Carlos Asprilla	2002–2005	30
4	(El Salvador) TBD	TBD-TBD	92
5	(El Salvador) TBD	TBD-TBD	71
