= Víctor Fuentes (Salvadoran footballer) =

Salvadoran footballer (born 1978)

Víctor Manuel Fuentes
Personal information
- Full name: Víctor Manuel Fuentes Martínez
- Date of birth: July 2, 1978 (age 48)
- Place of birth: La Unión, El Salvador
- Height: 1.65 m (5 ft 5 in)
- Position: Defender

Youth career
- 1996–1998: Águila Reserves

Senior career*
Years	Team	Apps	(Gls)
1998–2002	Águila		
2003–2006	Atlético Balboa		
2006–2009	FAS		

International career
2003	El Salvador	1	(0)

Managerial career
- 2018–: Águila (assistant)
- * Club domestic league appearances and goals

Víctor Manuel Fuentes Martínez (born July 2, 1978) is a former Salvadoran professional football defender.

== Club career ==
Fuentes joined the reserves team of Salvadoran giants Águila in 1996, before making his senior debut two years later. He later had a three-year stint at Atlético Balboa and moved to FAS in 2006.

== Coaching career ==
In December 2018, Fuentes was confirmed as new assistant coach of Carlos Romero at Águila for the Clausura 2019 tournament.

== International career ==
Fuentes made his debut for El Salvador in a February 2003 UNCAF Nations Cup match against Nicaragua, in what proved to be the only game for his country.
