= Genaro Sermeño =

Salvadoran footballer (1948–2022)

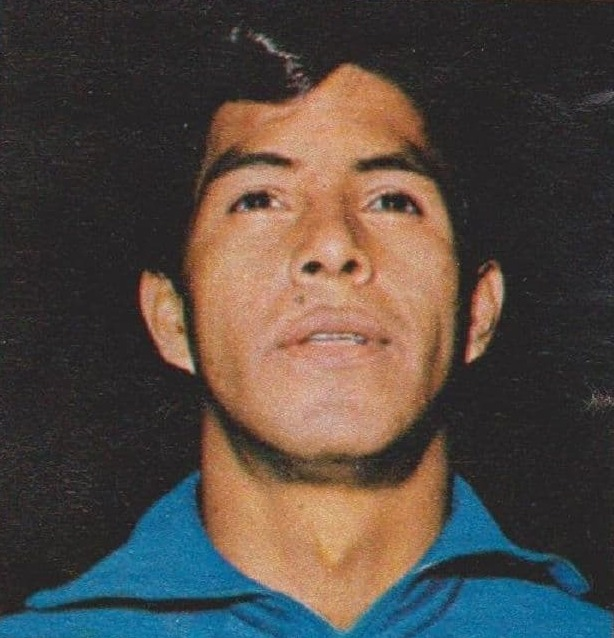
- Sermeño in 1970

Personal information
- Full name: Genaro Antonio Sermeño Quijada
- Date of birth: 28 November 1948
- Place of birth: El Congo, Santa Ana, El Salvador
- Date of death: 23 December 2022 (aged 74)
- Place of death: Santa Ana, El Salvador
- Height: 1.68 m (5 ft 6 in)
- Position: Midfielder

Senior career*
Years	Team	Apps	(Gls)
1967–1976	FAS		

International career
	El Salvador	4	(0)

Managerial career
- 1999: Juventud Olímpica
- 2005: Once Lobos
- * Club domestic league appearances and goals

Genaro Antonio Sermeño Quijada (28 November 1948 – 23 December 2022) was an El Salvadoran footballer who represented his country at the 1970 FIFA World Cup.

== Club career ==
Sermeño played eight years for FAS in which he scored 29 goals.

== International career ==
Nicknamed el Kaizer, Sermeño played 14 minutes for the El Salvador national team during the 1970 FIFA World Cup.

== Managerial career ==
In 1999, Sermeño was technical director of Juventud Olímpica.

== Death ==
On 23 December 2022, Sermeño died from complications from diabetes, at a private hospital in Santa Ana, El Salvador. He was 74.
