= Álvaro Méndez =

Uruguayan footballer (born 1976)

Personal information
- Full name: Álvaro Daniel Méndez Josa
- Date of birth: 6 April 1976 (age 50)
- Place of birth: Montevideo, Uruguay
- Height: 1.81 m (5 ft 11 in)
- Position: Striker

Team information
- Current team: São José-RS

Senior career*
Years	Team	Apps	(Gls)
2005	Metapán		
2006–2007	Sud América		
2007–2010	Rampla Juniors	11	(5)
2011–	São José-RS		
- * Club domestic league appearances and goals as of 30 January 2011

Álvaro Daniel Méndez Josa (born 6 April 1976 in Montevideo) is a Uruguayan footballer. He currently plays for Esporte Clube São José.

On 15 January 2011, he was transferred to Esporte Clube São José of Brazil.

== Career honours ==
- Finnish Championship 1996
