= Miloš Miljanić =

Serbian footballer

Personal information
- Full name: Miloš Miljanić
- Date of birth: 15 December 1960 (age 65)
- Place of birth: Belgrade, FPR Yugoslavia
- Position: Defender

Senior career*
Years	Team	Apps	(Gls)
- Belgrade

Managerial career
- 1996-1997: Mačva Šabac
- 1998–1999: Águila
- 2000: Beijing Guoan (assistant)
- 2001: Luis Ángel Firpo
- 2002–2003: Luis Ángel Firpo
- 2004: San Salvador
- 2006: Luis Ángel Firpo
- 2009–2011: Alianza
- 2013: Alianza
- * Club domestic league appearances and goals

Miloš Miljanić (Serbian Cyrillic: Милош Миљанић; born 1960) is a Serbian former football manager and player.

He was announced manager of Salvadoran side Alianza in 2013, after having led them to the Clausura final in 2010.

== Personal life ==
Miloš is the son of former Real Madrid and Red Star Belgrade manager Miljan Miljanić.
