= Eduardo Santana =

Brazilian footballer (1958–2023)

Personal information
- Full name: Carlos Eduardo Santana
- Date of birth: November 29, 1958
- Place of birth: Rio de Janeiro, Brazil
- Date of death: October 19, 2023 (aged 64)
- Place of death: Huehuetenango, Guatemala

Senior career*
Years	Team	Apps	(Gls)
1975–1976	Flamengo		
1977–1978	Vasco da Gama		
1979–1981	Águila		
1981–1983	Xelajú		
1984–1985	Aurora		
1986	Águila		
1987	Olimpia		
1988	Municipal		
1989	Alajuelense		
1990–1991	Suchitepéquez		
1992–1994	Juventus Caribbean		
1996	USAC		

Managerial career
- 1995: Juventus Caribbean
- 1998: Club Ayuntamiento (assistant)
- 1998: Deportivo Carchá
- 1999: Deportivo Suchitepéquez
- 2000: Zacapa
- 2001: USAC
- 2002: Cobán Imperial
- 2003: Belize
- 2004: Petapa
- 2005: Malacateco
- 2007: Deportivo Mixco
- 2008: Heredia
- 2009: Atlético Balboa
- 2009: Dragón
- 2023: Barillas FC
- * Club domestic league appearances and goals

Eduardo Santana (November 29, 1958 – October 19, 2023) was a Brazilian football player and manager.

He last coached C.D. Dragón in the Segunda División de Fútbol Salvadoreño of El Salvador.

== Playing career ==
A midfielder, Santana played for several clubs in Guatemala Xelajú (1981–1983), Aurora (1984–85), Municipal (1988), Deportivo Suchitepéquez (1989), Escuintla (1991–92), and Juventud Retalteca (1993–1994). He scored 52 goals.

== Death ==
On October 19, 2023, while coaching second division side Barillas FC, Santana suffered a heart attack and was pronounced dead.

== Honours ==
=== Players ===
Aurora F.C.

- Liga Nacional de Guatemala: 1984

Olimpia

- Liga Nacional de Fútbol de Honduras: 1987–1988

=== Manager ===
Alianza F.C.

- Salvadoran Primera División
