= Víctor Hugo Mafla =

Colombian footballer (born 1974)

Victor Hugo Mafla
Personal information
- Full name: Victor Hugo Mafla Vergara
- Date of birth: 7 January 1974 (age 52)
- Place of birth: Palmira Valle, Colombia
- Height: 1.70 m (5 ft 7 in)

Youth career
- 1992–1993: América de Cali

Senior career*
Years	Team	Apps	(Gls)
1994–1995	Deportes Quindío		
1996–1998	Cortuluá		
1997	Independiente Santa Fe		
1998	Cúcuta Deportivo		
1999	Alianza Lima		
2000	Atlético Bucaramanga		
2000	América de Cali		(19)
2001	Shanghai Shenhua		
2001	Deportivo Táchira		
2002–2005	FAS		
2006	Chalatenango		
- * Club domestic league appearances and goals

Victor Hugo Mafla Vergara (born 7 January 1974) is a Colombian former professional footballer who played as a midfielder.
