= Óscar Mejía =

Dominican Republic footballer

Oscar Mejia
Personal information
- Full name: Oscar Abreu Mejia
- Date of birth: December 7, 1978 (age 47)
- Place of birth: Dominican Republic
- Position: Goalkeeper

Senior career*
Years	Team	Apps	(Gls)
1999–2001	Baninter Jarabacoa FC		
2001	Long Island Rough Riders	19	(0)
2001–2003	Atlético Marte		(3)
2003–2006	Luis Ángel Firpo		
2007–2008	Moca FC		
2009–2013	Don Bosco Jarabacoa FC		
2018–	Jarabacoa FC		

International career
1996–2004	Dominican Republic	11+	(2)
- * Club domestic league appearances and goals

Oscar Abreu Mejia (born December 7, 1978) is a Dominican football goalkeeper who once played for C.D. Luis Ángel Firpo in El Salvador.

Mejía has appeared for the Dominican Republic national football team in 11 qualifying matches for FIFA World Cups.

== International goals ==
No.	Date	Venue	Opponent	Score	Result	Competition
1	18 August 2002	Instituto de Menores, Santo Domingo, Dominican Republic	U.S. Virgin Islands	4–1	6–1	2003 CONCACAF Gold Cup qualification
2	18 August 2002	Instituto de Menores, Santo Domingo, Dominican Republic	U.S. Virgin Islands	6–1	6–1	2003 CONCACAF Gold Cup qualification
