= Ernesto Góchez =

Salvadoran footballer (born 1976)

Personal information
- Full name: Ernesto Góchez Lovo
- Date of birth: September 14, 1976 (age 50)
- Place of birth: San Salvador, El Salvador
- Height: 1.73 m (5 ft 8 in)
- Position: Midfielder

Team information
- Current team: El Salvador (Administrative Director)

Youth career
- Colegio San Francisco
- 1994–1995: Atlético Marte Reserves

Senior career*
Years	Team	Apps	(Gls)
1995–2001	Atlético Marte		
2001–2005	FAS		
2006	Alianza		
2006	Chalatenango		
2007–2008	San Salvador FC		
2008–2009	Águila		

International career
1999–2004	El Salvador	18	(1)

Managerial career
- 2014-2016: El Salvador (Coordinater)
- 2016-2017: Sonsonate (assistant/interim coach)
- 2018: El Salvador under-20
- 2018–2021: El Salvador under-17
- 2021: Atlético Marte (assistant coach)
- 2022: Marte Soyapango
- 2023: FAS (Sporting Director)
- 2024-Present: El Salvador (Administrative Director)
- * Club domestic league appearances and goals

Ernesto Góchez Lovo (born September 14, 1976) is a former Salvadoran professional footballer.

== Club career ==
An attacking midfielder, Góchez's started his professional career at Atlético Marte and it spanned fourteen years while also playing top flight football for C.D. Águila, C.D. FAS, Alianza F.C., C.D. Chalatenango and San Salvador F.C.

In 2001, Góchez wanted to leave his first club, Atlético Marte, for Águila, only to see his move blocked by Marte who quickly responded by selling him to rivals FAS.

== Coaching career ==
Góchez was assistant to Argentinean coach Ramiro Cepeda and reserve team coach at Atlético Marte, until being dismissed in September 2009.

In December 2018, Góchez was confirmed as new coach of the El Salvador under-17.

Gochez was hired as the sporting director FAS on 2023. However due to disagreement with the board and lack of support, he ended up resigning

== International career ==
Góchez made his debut for El Salvador in a March 1999 UNCAF Nations Cup match against Honduras and has earned a total of 18 caps, scoring 1 goal. He has represented his country in 3 FIFA World Cup qualification matches and at the 1999 UNCAF Nations Cup

His final international was an August 2004 FIFA World Cup qualification against Panama.

=== International goals ===
Scores and results list El Salvador's goal tally first.

#	Date	Venue	Opponent	Score	Result	Competition
1	12 May 2004	Robertson Stadium, Houston, United States	Haiti	1–2	3–3	Friendly match

He currently acts as an official of the El Salvador national under-20 football team.
