= Marcelo Messias =

Salvadoran footballer (born 1981)

Personal information
- Full name: Marcelo Messias
- Date of birth: November 9, 1981 (age 44)
- Place of birth: Paranaguá-PR, Brazil
- Height: 1.84 m (6 ft 0 in)
- Position: Centre back

Senior career*
Years	Team	Apps	(Gls)
1995–2000	Rio Branco		
2000–2002	Grêmio		
2003	Antigua	17	(4)
2003–2005	FAS		
2006	Isidro Metapán		
2007	Chalatenango		
2008	Isidro Metapán		
2008–2009	Águila		
2010–2011	Alianza		
2012	Deportivo Petapa	41	(0)
2013–2014	Alianza	45	(2)
2015–2016	Chalatenango	41	(1)
2016–2017	Sonsonate	35	(0)
2018	Audaz	5	(0)

International career
2011	El Salvador	2	(0)
- * Club domestic league appearances and goals

Marcelo Messias (born November 9, 1981) is a former professional footballer who played as a defender. Born in Brazil, he represented El Salvador at international level.

== Club career ==
=== FAS ===
Messias signed with FAS of the Salvadoran Primera División in 2003. With the Santa Ana team, he won the Apertura 2003 and the Apertura 2004.

Also, he lost the Clausura 2004 final against Alianza on penalties.

=== Isidro Metapán ===
Messias signed with Isidro Metapán in 2006.

=== Chalatenango ===
Messias signed with Chalatenango in 2007.

=== Return to Isidro Metapán ===
He signed again with Isidro Metapán in 2008.

=== Águila ===
Time later. he signed with Águila.

=== Alianza ===
In 2010, he signed with Alianza. With Alianza, he lost the Apertura 2010 final against Isidro Metapán on penalties. However, in the next tournament, Alianza won the Clausura 2011 final against FAS.

=== Deportivo Petapa ===
In 2012, he signed with Deportivo Petapa.

=== Return to Alianza ===
Messias signed again with Alianza for the Clausura 2013.

=== Return to Chalatenango ===
In 2015, he signed again with Chalatenango.

=== Sonsonate ===
Messias signed with Sonsonate for the Apertura 2016.

=== Audaz ===
Messias signed with Audaz for the Clausura 2018. With Audaz, reached the quarter-finals of the Apertura 2018.

== International career ==
Messias was called up to train with the national team preliminary squad, which would take part in two friendly matches in March 2011.

Messias was able to be noticed and would take part in the first friendly of that month against Cuba and Jamaica. Messias came on as a substitute in that friendly match against Cuba and started against Jamaica.

== Personal life ==
Messias is married to a Salvadoran woman and he has two daughters. He is now a Salvadoran citizen.
