= Luís Castro (Salvadoran footballer) =

Salvadoran footballer (born 1981)

Personal information
- Full name: Luís Alberto Castro Díaz
- Date of birth: May 19, 1981 (age 45)
- Place of birth: La Libertad, El Salvador
- Height: 1.73 m (5 ft 8 in)
- Position: Goalkeeper

Team information
- Current team: Retired

Senior career*
| Years | Team | Apps | (Gls) |
| 2001–2009 | FAS | | |
| 2013–2015 | CD Aguiluchos USA | | |
| 2017–2018 | East Bay FC Stompers | | |

International career^{‡}
| 2003–2004 | El Salvador | 2 | (0) |

Managerial career
- 2015: FAS
- * Club domestic league appearances and goals ‡ National team caps and goals as of April 10, 2009

Luís Alberto Castro Díaz (born May 19, 1981) is a former Salvadoran footballer who last played for East Bay FC Stompers in the National Premier Soccer League.

== Club career ==
Castro has played the majority of his career for Salvadoran giants FAS.

== International career ==
Castro made his debut for El Salvador in a February 2003 UNCAF Nations Cup match against Nicaragua and has earned a total of 2 caps, scoring no goals. He has represented his country at the 2003 UNCAF Nations Cup.

His final international was a January 2004 friendly match against Panama.
