= Alexander Obregón =

Colombian footballer (1977-2009)

Álex Obregón
Personal information
- Full name: Alexander Obregón Gamboa
- Date of birth: 11 December 1977
- Place of birth: Cali, Colombia
- Date of death: 30 May 2009 (aged 31)
- Place of death: La Libertad, El Salvador
- Height: 1.77 m (5 ft 9 1/2 in)
- Position: Forward

Senior career*
Years	Team	Apps	(Gls)
1998	Giraldt F.C.		
1999	Seleccion Valle		
2000	Esc. de Futbol Sarmiento		
2001	América de Cali		
2001	Telecom		
2002–2003	San Salvador FC		
2003	CD Chalatenango	9	(2)
2003–2005	San Salvador FC	49	(6)
2005	CD FAS		(4)
2006	CD Luis Ángel Firpo		
2007	Independiente Nacional		
2008	Santa Tecla FC		
2009	Alba Acajutla		
- * Club domestic league appearances and goals as of January 2008 ‡ National team caps and goals as of 2008

Alexander Obregón Gamboa (11 December 1977 – 30 May 2009) was a Colombian footballer who played the majority of his career in El Salvador.

== Club career ==
Obregón arrived in El Salvador in 2001 and joined Salvadoran second division side Telecom. He joined San Salvador F.C. the next season, helping them win the 2003 Clausura title.

He later played for Luis Ángel Firpo, Chalatenango and FAS, playing his final season of top division football with Independiente Nacional in 2007 after they were relegated. He played for the newly formed Santa Tecla team and finally joined former coach Rubén Alonso at Alba Acajutla.

== Death ==
Obregón was involved in a fatal car crash in 2009, on the road to and just outside La Libertad. Former teammate and friend, Colombian player Christian Gil suffered severe injuries to the skull and thorax in the same accident.

== Honours ==
- Primera División de Fútbol de El Salvador: 1

2003
