= Vladan Vićević =

Serbian-Salvadoran football manager and player

- Vićević with Águila in 2006

Personal information
- Date of birth: 26 July 1967 (age 59)
- Place of birth: Titovo Užice, SR Serbia, SFR Yugoslavia
- Height: 1.85 m (6 ft 1 in)
- Position: Defender

Team information
- Current team: Sevojno (manager)

Youth career
- Sevojno

Senior career*
| Years | Team | Apps | (Gls) |
| 1988–1992 | Sloboda Užice | 97+ | (2+) |
| 1992–1996 | Bečej | 122 | (2) |
| 1996–1998 | Águila | | |
| 1998–2000 | Sloboda Užice | | |
| Total | | 219+ | (4+) |

International career
| 1997–1998 | El Salvador | 23 | (0) |

Managerial career
- 2003: Sevojno
- 2005–2006: Águila
- 2007–2008: Chalatenango
- 2011–2012: Alianza
- 2013: Águila
- 2017–2018: Sloboda Užice (assistant)
- 2022: Sloboda Užice
- 2024–2025: Sevojno
- * Club domestic league appearances and goals

Vladan Vićević (Serbian Cyrillic: Владан Вићевић; born 26 July 1967) is a Serbian-born naturalized Salvadoran football manager and former player.

== Club career ==
After starting out at Sevojno, Vićević made his Yugoslav Second League debut with Sloboda Užice in 1988. He made over 100 appearances in the second tier of Yugoslav football throughout the next four seasons.

Following the breakup of SFR Yugoslavia, Vićević joined First League of FR Yugoslavia newcomers Bečej in 1992. He helped them to a fourth-place finish in the 1994–95 season, as the club earned a spot in European competitions for the first time in history.

In 1996, Vićević moved abroad to El Salvador to play for Águila under compatriot Milovan Đorić. He returned to Sloboda Užice in 1998 and played in the Second League of FR Yugoslavia for two seasons before retiring.

== International career ==
Nicknamed El Bicho, Vićević became a Salvadoran citizen in February 1997 and was soon eligible to play for El Salvador. He made his international debut for his adopted country during the tenure of Milovan Đorić in a March 1997 friendly with Guatemala. His final cap came in a 1998 CONCACAF Gold Cup match against Jamaica.

In total, Vićević was capped 23 times by El Salvador between 1997 and 1998.

== Managerial career ==
In July 2005, Vićević was appointed as manager of Águila. He resigned from his position in December 2006. In April 2007, Vićević took charge of Chalatenango. He left the club by mutual consent in February 2008. He rejoined Águila in June 2013.

In April 2022, Vićević was officially appointed as manager of Sloboda Užice, leading the club to the Serbian League West title and promotion to the Serbian First League.

== Career statistics ==
| Club | Season | League | |
| Club | Season | Apps | Goals |
|---|---|---|---|
| Bečej | 1992–93 | 30 | 0 |
| Bečej | 1993–94 | 27 | 1 |
| Bečej | 1994–95 | 33 | 0 |
| Bečej | 1995–96 | 32 | 1 |
| Bečej | Total | 122 | 2 |
