= Ernesto Aquino =

Honduran footballer (born 1975)

Personal information
- Full name: Ernesto Noel Aquino Pérez
- Date of birth: October 16, 1975 (age 51)
- Place of birth: La Ceiba, Honduras
- Height: 1.76 m (5 ft 9 in)
- Position: Centre-back

Youth career
- 1994–1999: Victoria

Senior career*
| Years | Team | Apps | (Gls) |
| 1999–2000 | Victoria | | |
| 2000–2006 | Atlético Balboa | | |
| 2006–2008 | Once Municipal | | |
| 2008–2013 | Isidro Metapán | | |

International career
| 1995 | Honduras U20 | | |
- * Club domestic league appearances and goals

Ernesto Noel Aquino Pérez (born October 16, 1975) is a Honduran former footballer who played as a centre-back.

== Club career ==
Aquino started his professional career with hometown club Victoria de la Ceiba but moved abroad to join Salvadoran side Atlético Balboa before the Apertura 2000 season. He has not left Salvadoran football since, playing for Once Municipal before moving to Isidro Metapán in 2008.

== Honours ==
Once Municipal

- Salvadoran Primera División: Apertura 2006

Isidro Metapán

- Salvadoran Primera División: 2008 Apertura, 2009 Clausura, 2010 Clausura, 2010 Apertura, 2011 Apertura
