= Horacio Cordero =

Argentine footballer and manager

Horacio Raúl Cordero Vásquez
Personal information
- Full name: Horacio Raúl Cordero Vásquez
- Date of birth: 22 May 1950 (age 76)
- Place of birth: Buenos Aires, Argentina
- Position: Midfielder

Senior career*
Years	Team	Apps	(Gls)
1969–1975	Argentinos Juniors	174	(49)
1975–1978	Racing	220	(22)
1979	Millonarios	5	(1)
1980	Cipoletti	4	(0)
1981–1982	Sarmiento (J)	76	(9)
1983	Unión de Santa Fe	47	(4)
1984–1987	Racing Club	(see above)	
1987–1988	Deportivo Morón	?	(?)

International career
1974	Argentina	1	(0)

Managerial career
- 1991: Club Atlético San Miguel
- 1992–1995: C.S.D. Municipal
- 1996–1997: Guatemala
- 1997: Costa Rica
- 2000–2001: C.S.D. Municipal
- 2001: PAS Giannina F.C.
- 2002–2004: Comunicaciones
- 2005–2007: Deportivo Suchitepéquez
- 2007: Luis Ángel Firpo
- 2008–2009: C.S.D. Municipal
- 2010–2012: Xelajú MC
- 2013–2014: Universidad SC
- 2019–2020: C.S.D. Municipal
- * Club domestic league appearances and goals

Horacio Raúl Cordero Vásquez (born 22 May 1950 in Buenos Aires) is an Argentine football manager and former player.

== Playing career ==
Cordero played for a number of clubs in Argentina including Argentinos Juniors, Racing Club, Unión de Santa Fe, Cipoletti, Deportivo Morón and Sarmiento de Junín.

He also played in Colombia for Millonarios.

== Managerial career ==
He has spent the majority of his career coaching clubs in Central America, where he has won multiple league titles, most notably in Guatemala with C.S.D. Municipal (4 titles) and CSD Comunicaciones (2 titles). His six championships in Guatemala are the second most by any coach behind Rubén Amorín's eight.

Cordero has also coached the Guatemala national team in 1996 and the Costa Rica national team in 1997.
