= Henry Vanegas =

Colombian footballer (born 1960)

Personal information
- Date of birth: July 29, 1960 (age 66)
- Place of birth: Colombia
- Position: Midfielder

International career
Years	Team	Apps	(Gls)
- Colombia

Managerial career
- 1997: Municipal Limeño
- 2002–2003: Municipal Limeño
- 2003: Alianza
- 2005: Atlético Balboa
- 2007: San Salvador
- 2008: Cúcuta Deportivo (youth)
- 2008: Puntarenas FC
- 2013: Cúcuta Deportivo
- 2017: Dragón
- 2020: EF San Pablo Tacachico

Henry Vanegas Pacheco (born July 29, 1960) is a Colombian football manager and former player who managed second division side EF San Pablo Tacachico
