= Ramón Flores (footballer) =

Salvadoran footballer (born 1982)

Personal information
- Full name: Ramón Ulises Flores Aguirre
- Date of birth: August 21, 1982 (age 44)
- Place of birth: Santa Ana, El Salvador
- Height: 1.74 m (5 ft 9 in)
- Position: Right-back

Senior career*
| Years | Team | Apps | (Gls) |
| 2000–2001 | FAS B | | |
| 2001–2010 | FAS | | |
| 2010 | Once Municipal | 0 | (0) |
| 2011–2014 | FAS | 69 | (4) |
| 2015–2016 | Juventud Independiente | 6 | (0) |

International career
| 2008–2012 | El Salvador | 16 | (0) |
- * Club domestic league appearances and goals

Ramón Ulises Flores Aguirre (born August 21, 1982) is a Salvadoran former footballer who played as a right-back. He was banned for life in 2013, for match-fixing while playing for the El Salvador national football team.

== Club career ==
Flores was born in Santa Ana. After having spent well over a decade with the FAS institution, he left in 2010 to join Once Municipal, a club that had just been promoted before he signed a one-year contract. He rejoined FAS however for the 2011 Clausura.

== International career ==
Flores received his first call up to the senior national team in January 2008. He received his first cap on January 22, 2008, in a friendly match against Belize. Flores represented his country in 6 2010 FIFA World Cup qualifying games, in which he played a few games under Mexican coach Carlos de los Cobos.

On September 20, 2013, Flores was one of 14 Salvadoran players banned for life by El Salvador's football federation for match fixing.
