= Franklin Webster (footballer) =

Honduran footballer (born 1978)

Personal information
- Full name: Franklin Vinosis Webster
- Date of birth: August 7, 1978 (age 48)
- Place of birth: San Pedro Sula, Honduras
- Height: 1.69 m (5 ft 7 in)
- Position: Forward

Youth career
- 1990–1996: Victoria (reserve team)

Senior career*
Years	Team	Apps	(Gls)
1997–1999	Victoria		
2000–2002	Atlético Balboa		
2002–2004	San Salvador		(12)
2005	Atlético Balboa		
2006–2008	Chalatenango		(24)
2008–2009	Atlético Balboa	18	(8)
2009	FAS	8	(0)
2010	Alacranes Del Norte	1	(0)
2010	Vista Hermosa	4	(1)
2011	Heredia		
2011–2012	Atlético Balboa		
2012–2013	Ciclón del Golfo		
- * Club domestic league appearances and goals

Franklin Vinosis Webster (born August 7, 1978) is a Honduran former professional footballer who played as a forward.

== Career ==
Webster started his career playing forward for Victoria but moved abroad to play the rest of his career in El Salvador.

In summer 2002 he moved from Atlético Balboa to San Salvador, only to return to Atlético Balboa ahead of the 2004 Clausura season. He played the 2009 Apertura for Salvadoran giants FAS. Franklin Vinosis Webster also played for Alacranes Del Norte and returned to Atlético Balboa in 2011.

In August 2010, he had to leave Vista Hermosa after only four matches due to financial difficulties. He then joined the Guatemalan outfit Heredia.
