= Darío Larrosa =

Uruguayan footballer (born 1971)

Personal information
- Full name: Ramón Darío Larrosa De los Santos
- Date of birth: 13 December 1971 (age 54)
- Place of birth: Montevideo, Uruguay
- Height: 1.86 m (6 ft 1 in)
- Position: Midfielder

Team information
- Current team: Racing Club de Montevideo

Senior career*
Years	Team	Apps	(Gls)
1999	Racing Club		
2000	Juventud		
2001	Municipal		
2002	Juventud		
2003–2005	Águila		
2006–2007	Progreso	30	(4)
2008	Racing Club	56	(10)

Managerial career
- 2016–2017: Aguila (sports director)
- 2016: Aguila (interim coach)
- * Club domestic league appearances and goals

Ramón Darío Larrosa De los Santos (born 13 December 1971 in Montevideo) is a Uruguayan footballer who played for Racing Club de Montevideo.
