= Jorge García (footballer, born 1956) =

Argentine footballer and manager

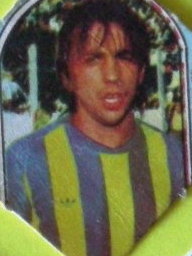
- Jorge Alberto García

Personal information
- Full name: Jorge Alberto García
- Date of birth: 12 November 1956 (age 69)
- Place of birth: Rosario, Argentina
- Position: Defender

Senior career*
Years	Team	Apps	(Gls)
1975–1981	Rosario Central	265	(15)
1981–1984	River Plate	127	(11)
1985–1986	San Lorenzo	58	(1)
1987–1988	Unión de Santa Fe	29	(2)

Managerial career
- 2003: Municipal Limeño
- 2004–2005: Atlético Balboa
- 2005: Águila
- 2006: Atlético Balboa
- 2006–2007: Once Municipal
- 2007: Macará
- 2007–2008: Vista Hermosa
- 2008–2009: Municipal Limeño
- 2009: Atlético Balboa
- 2010: Vista Hermosa
- 2012–2013: Atlético Marte
- 2013: Ciclón del Golfo
- 2013–2014: UES
- 2014: Pasaquina
- 2015: Atlético Marte
- 2016: Defensores Unidos
- 2016: Club Maciel
- 2018-2019: Defensores de Centeno
- 2025: Club Boca de Serodino
- * Club domestic league appearances and goals as of December 12, 2025 ‡ National team caps and goals as of April 15, 2017

Jorge Alberto García (born 12 November 1956) is a former Argentine football player and manager.

He won two league titles in Argentina with Rosario Central in 1980 and River Plate in 1981.

He also played for San Lorenzo and Unión de Santa Fe.

After retiring as a player, García want on to become a football coach in El Salvador.

== Honours ==
=== Playing ===
==== Club ====
Rosario Central

- Primera División Argentina: Nacional 1980

River Plate

- Primera División Argentina: Nacional 1981

=== Manager ===
==== Club ====
Atlético Balboa

- Copa Presidente
  - Champion: 2005–2006
