= Carlos de Toro =

Argentine footballer and manager

Personal information
- Full name: Carlos Alberto de Toro
- Date of birth: 12 November 1963 (age 62)
- Place of birth: Argentina

Managerial career
- Years: Team
- 1997: Sacachispas
- 1998: Comunicaciones
- 2003–2004: Cartaginés
- 2004: CD Águila
- 2004: Puntarenas
- 2005–2006: Victoria
- 2006: Ramonense
- 2007–2008: Nicaragua
- 2009: Atlético Balboa
- 2010–2011: Cobán Imperial
- 2012–2013: Diriangén
- 2014: Limón FC
- 2016: Club San José
- 2019: CD Luis Ángel Firpo
- 2019: AD Municipal Liberia
- 2022: Pérez Zeledón (Assistant)
- 2022-Present: Sacachispas

Carlos Alberto de Toro (born 11 December 1963) is an Argentine former football player and manager.
