= San Salvador FC =

San Salvador F.C.
- Full name: San Salvador Fútbol Club
- Nickname: Las Panteras (The Panthers)
- Founded: 7 January 2002
- Dissolved: 2008; 18 years ago
- Ground: Estadio Cuscatlán
- Capacity: 52,900
Home colors	Away colors

San Salvador Fútbol Club was a professional football club located in San Salvador, El Salvador that participated in Primera División de Fútbol Profesional from 2002 to 2008.

The club played its home games at Estadio Cuscatlán, which is the largest stadium in El Salvador.

== History ==
The club was only founded on 7 January 2002 and bought the licence of ADET to compete in the 2002 Clausura season of the Salvadoran Premier Division. They boasted an impressive squad of Salvadoran internationals, most prominently Salvadoran legend Mágico González, and won the Clausura 2003 league title.

After the Clausura 2008 season, San Salvador finished second last in the league and as a result had to take part in a playoff with Segunda División runner-up Juventud Independiente to stay in the First division. San Salvador lost the home and away playoff 4–2 on aggregate and was relegated. Following this San Salvador continued to have problems, although this time it was due to players complaining that they had not been paid. San Salvador could not afford to pay its players, so it decided to sell its spot in the Segunda División, and paid its players with the money that they got. This effectively killed the club, and it has since ceased operations.

== Home stadium ==
- Estadio Cuscatlán (2002–2008)

== Honours ==
=== Domestic ===
- Primera División Salvadorean and predecessors
  - Champions: (1) : Clausura 2003
  - Runners-up: (1) : Apertura 2002

== Year-by-year ==
Year	Reg. season	Finals
Clausura 2002	8th	did not qualify
Apertura 2002	1st	Runner-up
Clausura 2003	2nd	Winner
Apertura 2003	5th	did not qualify
Clausura 2004	10th	did not qualify
Apertura 2004	2nd	Semi-Finalist
Clausura 2005	9th	did not qualify
Apertura 2005	5th	did not qualify
Clausura 2006	7th	did not qualify
Apertura 2006	6th	did not qualify
Clausura 2007	7th	did not qualify
Apertura 2007	8th	did not qualify
Clausura 2008	10th	did not qualify

== Head coaches ==
- (El Salvador) Jaime Rodríguez (Jan 2002 -)
- (Uruguay) (El Salvador) Rubén Alonso (Aug 2002 – Dec 2003)
- (Uruguay) Daniel Uberti (Dec 2003 – Feb 2004)
- (Serbia) (El Salvador) Miloš Miljanić (Feb 2004 – April 2004)
- (Uruguay) Saul Lorenzo Rivero (June 2004 – Dec 2004)
- (Argentina) (El Salvador) Hugo Coria (Jan 2005– June 2005)
- (El Salvador) Juan Ramón Paredes (July 2005 – October 2005)
- (Argentina) Juan Quarterone (October 2005 – Feb 2006)
- (El Salvador) Antonio Orellana Rico (Feb 2006–Sep 2006)
- (Argentina) (El Salvador) Hugo Coria (Sep 2006 – Dec 2006)
- (El Salvador) Antonio Orellana Rico (Feb 2007 – April 2007)
- (Uruguay) Saul Lorenzo Rivero (April 2007– August 2007)
- (El Salvador) Oscar Emigdio Benítez (Apertura 2007 – Jan 2008)
- (Uruguay) (El Salvador) Rubén Alonso (March 2008– July 2008)

== Team records ==
- Games:
  (United States) TBD (100)
- Goals:
  (Colombia) Alexander Obregon (37)
- Assists:
  (Colombia) TBD (36)
- Clean Sheets:
  (United States) TBD

=== Top goalscorers ===
No.	Player	period	Goals
1	(Colombia) Alexander Obregón	2002–2005	37
2	(Argentina) Rodrigo Lagos	2003–2005	37
3	(Argentina) (El Salvador) Emiliano Pedrozo	2002–2003	30
4	(El Salvador) Eliseo Quintanilla	2005–2007	21
5	(El Salvador) TBD	2019	tbd
6	(Honduras) Franklin Webster	2003–2004	12
7	(El Salvador) TBD	2019	tbd
8	(El Salvador) TBD	2019	tbd
9	(El Salvador) TBD	2019	tbd
10	(El Salvador) TBD	2019	5

Note: Players in bold text are still active with San Salvador
