= List of A.D. Isidro Metapan players =

Asociación Deportiva Isidro Metapán is a Salvadoran professional football club based in Metapán. The club was founded as Isidro Menendez in 1950 but became Isidro Metapan in 2000.

== List of players ==
- Appearances and goals are for first-team competitive matches only, including domestic league (Primera División), CONCACAF competition (CONCACAF Champions League), and UNCAF competition (Copa Interclubes UNCAF) matches
- Players are listed according to the date of their first team debut for the club.

Statistics correct as of match played 6 June 2024

Table headers

- **Nationality** – If a player played international football, the country/countries he played for are shown. Otherwise, the player's nationality is given as their country of birth.
- **Metapan career** – The year of the player's first appearance for Metapan to the year of his last appearance.
- **Bold** represents current players.

Name	Nationality	Position	Metapan career	Appearances	Goals
Hector Omar Mejia	El Salvador	MF	2000-2015	476	
Adolfo Menéndez	El Salvador	GK	2000–2005		
Enllelbert Gonzalez	El Salvador	GK	2000–2010		
Vicente Melgar	El Salvador	MF	2000–2002, 2007, 2009		
Guillermo Rivera	El Salvador	MF	2000–2002		
Jaime Vladimir Cubías	El Salvador	CB	2000–2001		
Johny Olmedo	El Salvador	DF	2000–2004		
René Ramos	El Salvador	CDM	2001-2004, 2005-2007		
William Renderos Iraheta	El Salvador	FW	2000–2002		
Alessandro Rodríguez	Brazil	FW	2000–2002		
Noé dos Santos	Brazil	FW	2000		
Jorge Guillermo Wagner	Honduras	FW	2000–2003		
Anderson Batista	Brazil	DF	2000-2003		
Luis Carlos Asprilla	Colombia	DF	2001		
Mario Posadas	El Salvador	DF	2001–2011		
Diego Rafael Álvarez	Argentina	DF	2001, 2002–2003		
René Valle	El Salvador	MF	2001–2004		
José Carlos Orellana	El Salvador	DF	2001		
Salvador Portillo	El Salvador	MF	2000-2001, 2003		
Juan Ignacio Fuliana	Argentina	MF	2001		
Fredy Landaverde	El Salvador	MF	2001		
Fredy Vichéz	El Salvador	MF	2001, 2007		
Carlos Castro Borja	El Salvador	MF	2001		
Franco Rodríguez	El Salvador	MF	2001		
Sergio Salgado	El Salvador	FW	2001		
Hugo Sarmiento	Honduras	FW	2001–2002		
Claudio Pasadi	Uruguay	FW	2001		
Diego Oyarbide	Argentina	FW	2001, 2002		
Esteban Cárdenas	Argentina	FW	2001		
Eugenio Dolmo Flores	Honduras	FW	2001		
Fabián Méndez	El Salvador	FW	2001		
Alexander Escobar	El Salvador	DF	2002-2012		
Óscar Armando Martínez	El Salvador	DF	2002-2003		
Juan Manuel Palma	El Salvador	DF	2002-2009		
Wilman Javier González	El Salvador	MF	2002-2003, 2004		
Noél Faustino Flores	Honduras	FW	2002		
Marvin Brown	Honduras	FW	2002		
Oscar Ulloa	El Salvador	FW	2002-2005, 2009		
Nélson Osvaldo Duarte	Paraguay	FW	2002		
Gustavo Corleto	El Salvador	GK	2003, 2005-2012		
Manuel González	El Salvador	GK	2003-2004		
Juan Dario Bicca	Uruguay	DF	2003-2004, 2005		
Juan Pinto	Uruguay	DF	2003		
Ricardo Cuellar	El Salvador	DF	2003		
Juan Lavaca	Argentina	DF	2003		
Wilson Sánchez	Colombia	DF	2003		
Oswaldo Reyes	El Salvador	DF	2003		
René Durán	El Salvador	DF	2003-2004		
Erick Dowson Prado	El Salvador	DF	2002–2006		
Edwin Orellana	El Salvador	DF	2003		
Alex Rodríguez	El Salvador	MF	2003		
Juan Carlos Serrano	El Salvador	MF	2004		
Martín Uranga	Argentina	FW	2003		
Juan Carlos Reyes	Uruguay	FW	2003, 2004		
Rolando Solis	El Salvador	FW	2003		
Alcides Eduardo Bandera	Uruguay	DF	2003–2004, 2005		
Gustavo Vecchiarelli	Argentina	FW	2003-2004		
Julio Enrique Martínez	El Salvador	MF	2003–2008, 2011, 2012		
Johnny Descolines	Haiti	FW	2003-2004		
Miguel Ángel Soriano	El Salvador	FW	2003		
Dagoberto Portillo	El Salvador	GK	2004-2005, 2007–2008		
Roberto Guadalupe Martínez	El Salvador	DF	2004		
Julián Regalado	El Salvador	DF	2004		
Ronald Okeli Rosales	El Salvador	DF	2004		
Marlon Godoy	Honduras	DF	2004-2005		
Jaime Torres Hidalgo	El Salvador	DF	2004		
Ernesto Iraheta	El Salvador	DF	2004, 2005-2009		
Alvaro Enrique Ramírez	El Salvador	MF	2004-2005		
Ricardo Machado	El Salvador	MF	2004		
Helman Monterrosa	El Salvador	MF	2004		
Andrés Bassano	Uruguay	MF	2004		
Magdonio Corrales	El Salvador	FW	2004		
Paolo Suárez	El SalvadorUruguay	FW	2004, 2005–2006, 2007–2012, 2015		
Alvaro Daniel Méndez	Uruguay	FW	2004-2005		
Rodin Álfaro	El Salvador	FW	2004		
Álvaro Misael Alfaro	El Salvador	GK	2005-2006, 2007-2009		10
Guadalupe Hernández	El Salvador	DF	2005		
Marcelo Messias	El SalvadorBrazil	DF	2005-2007		
Cristobal Amaya	El Salvador	DF	2005		
William Osorio	El Salvador	DF	2005		
José Armando Díaz	El Salvador	DF	2005		
Rodrigo Lagos	Argentina	MF	2005-2006		
Roberto Erazo	El Salvador	DF	2005		
Abraham Monterrosa	El Salvador	MF	2005		
Adonai Martínez	El Salvador	FW	2005-2006		
José Alexander Amaya	El Salvador	MF	2005-2008		
Cesar Ramírez	El Salvador	MF	2005		
Froilan Gálvez	El Salvador	FW	2005-2009,2012		
Nelson Portillo	El Salvador	FW	2005		
Juan López Padilla	El Salvador	FW	2005		
Williams Reyes	El SalvadorHonduras	FW	2005-2008		
Julio Castro	El Salvador	DF	2006-2008		
Rafael Tobar	El Salvador	DF	2006		
Carlos Carrillo	El Salvador	DF	2006-2007		
Carlos Alberto Gómez	Argentina	MF	2006-2007		
Emanuel Bentil	Ghana	MF	2006	33	1
Emiliano Pedrozo	El SalvadorArgentina	FW	2006		
Jorge Rodríguez	El Salvador	DF	2006-2007		
Jorge Morán	El Salvador	MF	2006-2011		
José Ricardo Alvarado	El Salvador	MF	2006-2011		
Jaime Gomez Martinez	El Salvador	MF	2006-2007		
Johnny Avila	Honduras	FW	2007		
Fábio Pereira de Azevedo	TogoBrazil	FW	2006-2007		
Moises Menéndez	El Salvador	DF	2007-2009		
Ruben Cedillos	El Salvador	DF	2007		
Gabriel Garcete	Paraguay	FW	2007-2008, 2011-2012		
Juan Carlos Panameño	El Salvador	MF	2007		
**Milton Molina**	El Salvador	DF	2008-Present		
Mauricio Edgardo Artero	El Salvador	DF	2008-2009		
Napoleón Baires	El Salvador	MF	2008		
William Figueroa	El Salvador	MF	2008-2009		
Carlos Menjivar	El SalvadorUnited States	MF	2008	14	1
Ernesto Noel Aquino	Honduras El Salvador	DF	2008-2013		
Flavio Rivas	El Salvador	MF	2008		
Gustavinho	Brazil	FW	2008	5	1
Andrés Flores	El Salvador	FW	2008-2011, 2012-2013		
Raúl Quijada	El Salvador	FW	2008-2015		
Ramon Váldez	El Salvador	FW	2008-2009		
José Luis González	El Salvador	GK	2009-2010		
Julio Cerritos	El Salvador	DF	2009, 2013–2016, 2018-2020		
Nelson Rivera	El Salvador	DF	2009	1	0
Ramiro Carballo	El Salvador	DF	2009	10	
Josué Odir Flores	El Salvador	MF	2009-2010, 2014-2015	21	8
Emerson Umaña	El Salvador	MF	2009–2010		
Elias Montes	El Salvador	FW	2009		
Anel Canales	Panama	FW	2009-2010	36	17
Osvaldo Mendoza	Paraguay	FW	2009	7	0
Oscar Jiménez	El Salvador	FW	2009-2010	33	0
Fidel Mondragón	El Salvador	GK	2010-2014, 2016-2017	84	0
Miguel Montes	El Salvador	GK	2010-2011	29	0
Fidel Jiménez	El Salvador	FW	2010		
Alfredo Pacheco	El Salvador	DF	2010–		
Marvin Monterrosa	El Salvador	DF	2010–2017	190	32
Óscar Daniel Escalante	El Salvador	MF	2010-2012, 2013		
Ramón Sánchez	El Salvador	MF	2010-2012	54	5
Edwin Sánchez	El Salvador	MF	2010-2011	26	4
Léster Blanco	El Salvador	FW	2010-2011, 2012		
Cesar Larios	El Salvador	FW	2010		
Christian Javier Bautista	El Salvador	FW	2010-2012		
Kevin Santamaria	El Salvador	FW	2010		
Allan Kardeck	Brazil	FW	2010-2011	28	7
Henry Hernández	El Salvador	GK	2011-2016	88	0
Fermín Morales	El Salvador	DF	2011		
Luis Mauricio Perla	El Salvador	DF	2011-2013		
Shawn Martin	El Salvador Nicaragua	DF	2011-2013		
Christian Sánchez	El Salvador	DF	2011-2017	136	20
Eliseo Quintanilla	El Salvador	MF	2011-2013		
Nicolás Muñoz	Panama El Salvador	FW	2011-2014		
Jorge Ramírez	Uruguay	FW	2011-2012		
Leonardo Silva	Brazil	FW	2011		
Diego Bertín Peraza Campos	El Salvador	FW	2011-		
Derlin Romero	El Salvador	DF	2012-2015		
**José Antonio Ramos Peraza**	El Salvador	DF	2012-		
Pericles Pinto	Brazil Paraguay	FW	2012-2013		
Michael Funes	El Salvador United States	FW	2012-2013		
Edenilson Mezquita	El Salvador	FW	2012		
**Francisco Jovel Álvarez**	El Salvador	DF	2013-		
**William Omar Barrios**	El Salvador	DF	2013-		
**Samuel Maldonado**	El Salvador	DF	2013-		
**Jonathan Barrios**	El Salvador	DF	2013-		
Melvin Orantes	El Salvador	DF	2013		
**Luis López**	El Salvador	DF	2013-		
**Edwin Vladimir Hernández**	El Salvador	MF	2013-		
Victor Merino	El Salvador	MF	2013-2015		
Jaime Ortíz	El Salvador	MF	2013-		
**Iván Barahona**	El Salvador	MF	2013-		
**Narciso Orellana**	El Salvador	MF	2013-2017		
Juan Barrientos	El Salvador	FW	2012-2013		
Romeo Parkes	Jamaica	FW	2013-2015		
**David Eduardo López**	Mexico United States	FW			
**Rene Alvarado**	El Salvador	FW	2013-		
Héctor Ramos	Puerto Rico United States	FW	2013-2015		
**Óscar Pleitéz**	El Salvador	GK	2013-Present	261	0
**Félix Sánchez**	El Salvador	DF	2014-		
**Cristian Cisneros**	El Salvador	MF	2014-		
**Medardo Max Guevara**	El Salvador	FW	2014-		
**Jose Castellon**	El Salvador	MF	2015-		
**Marvin Figueroa**	El Salvador	MF	2015-		
**Wilfredo Mirón**	El Salvador	MF	2015-		
**Edenilson González**	El Salvador	MF	2015-		
Ricardo Ulloa	El Salvador	FW	2014–2015	25	4
Óscar Cerén	El Salvador	MF	2015–2016, 2022-2023	59	9
Rudy Clavel	El Salvador	DF	2015–2016	75	1
Andrés Angulo	Colombia	FW	2015	5	0
Mike Lopez	Colombia	FW	2016	21	0
José Ángel Peña	El Salvador	FW	2015–2017	85	18
**Nelson Gonzalez**	El Salvador	MF	2016–		
Carlos Monterrosa	El Salvador	MF	2015–2018	28	2
José Otoniel Salinas	El Salvador	FW	2015–2016	23	3
**Mauricio Cuellar**	El Salvador	DF	TBD–		
**Luca Orozco**	Argentina	DF	TBD–		
**Guillermo Stradella**	ArgentinaEl Salvador	MF	2023–Present		
**Miguel Lemus**	El Salvador	FW	TBD–		
align="left"	Dennis Garcia	El Salvador	DF	TBD–2024	
**Erivan Flores**	El Salvador	MF	TBD–		
**Cristian Aguilar**	El Salvador	FW	TBD–		
**Cesar Noe Flores**	El Salvador	MF	TBD–		
**Jose Ortiz Cabanas**	Paraguay	MF	2024–Present		
**Diego Gregori**	Spain	MF	2021–Present		
**Jerry Ramirez**	El Salvador United States	MF	TBD–		
**Hector Cruz**	El Salvador	MF	TBD–		
**Jonathan Isaac Esquivel**	El Salvador	MF	TBD–		
**Fernando Clavel**	El Salvador	MF	TBD–		
Alejandro Henriquez	El Salvador	FW	TBD–2024		
**Bayron Lopez**	El Salvador	MF	TBD–		
**Javier Cetre**	Ecuador	MF	TBD–		
**J Dubon**	El Salvador	MF	TBD–		
**Kevin Vidal**	El Salvador	MF	TBD–		
**Isaac Portillo**	El Salvador	FW	TBD–		
**José Murcia**	El Salvador	DF	TBD–		
**Jaime Ortiz**	El Salvador	MF	TBD–		
**Kevin Lemus**	El Salvador	MF	TBD–		
**Bryan Rios**	El Salvador	MF	TBD–		
**David Rosales**	El Salvador	MF	TBD–		
**Steven Mancia**	El Salvador	MF	TBD–		
**Christopher Guardado**	El Salvador	MF	TBD–		
**Anderson Mejia**	El Salvador	MF	TBD–		
**Raul Cruz**	El Salvador	MF	TBD–		
**Marcos Martinez**	El Salvador	MF	TBD–		
**Óscar Daniel Arroyo**	El Salvador	GK	TBD–		
**Julio Amaya**	El Salvador	MF	TBD–		
**Luis Rivera**	El Salvador	GK	TBD–		
**Daniel Arevalo**	El Salvador	MF	2024–Present		
**Steven Guerra**	El Salvador	MF	2024–Present		
