= Primera División de Fútbol Profesional Apertura 2002 =

Primera División de Fútbol de El Salvador
- Champions: C.D. FAS (13th title)
- Relegated: None
- Top goalscorer: TBD (12)

The Salvador Primera División de Fútbol Profesional Apertura 2002 season (officially "Torneo Apertura 2002") started on August 3, 2002.

Primera División de Fútbol Profesional Apertura 2002 season was composed of the following clubs:

- C.D. FAS
- C.D. Municipal Limeño
- San Salvador F.C.
- C.D. Águila
- C.D. Luis Ángel Firpo
- A.D. Isidro Metapán
- C.D. Atlético Balboa
- Alianza F.C.
- Arcense
- C.D. Dragón

== Team information ==
=== Personnel and sponsoring ===
| Team | Chairman | Head coach | Kitmaker | Shirt sponsor |
|---|---|---|---|---|
| Águila | (El Salvador) | (Argentina) Hugo Coria | TBD | TBD |
| Alianza | (El Salvador) Ricardo Padilla Pinto | (Colombia) German Guiterrez | TBD | TBD |
| Atletico Balboa | (El Salvador) TBD | (Argentina) Juan Quarterone | TBD | TBD |
| C.D. Arcense | (El Salvador) TBD | (El Salvador) Ricardo Guardado | TBD | TBD |
| C.D. Dragon | (El Salvador) TBD | (Brazil) Antonio Carlos Viera | TBD | TBD |
| FAS | (El Salvador) Reynaldo Valle | (Peru) Agustín Castillo | TBD | TBD |
| Firpo | (El Salvador) TBD | (Federal Republic of Yugoslavia) Milos Mijanic | TBD | TBD |
| Isidro Metapan | (El Salvador) José Gumercindo Landaverde | (Argentina) Roberto Fabrizio | TBD | TBD |
| Municipal Limeno | (El Salvador) TBD | (Colombia) Henry Vanegas | TBD | TBD |
| San Salvador F.C. | (El Salvador) Marco Flores | (Uruguay) Ruben Alonso | TBD | TBD |

== Notable events ==
=== Notable death during the Apertura 2002 season ===
The following people associated with the Primera Division have died between the middle of 2002 and end of 2002.

- Billy Rodriguez Bou 13.10.2002 (ex FAS, and Excélsior FC)

== Managerial changes ==
=== Before the season ===
| Team | Outgoing manager | Manner of departure | Date of vacancy | Replaced by | Date of appointment | Position in table |
|---|---|---|---|---|---|---|
| Aguila | (El Salvador) Rubén Guevara | Resigned | June 2002 | (Argentina) Hugo Coria | June 2002 | |
| Municipal Limeño | (El Salvador) Óscar Emigdio Benítez | TBD | May 2002 | (Colombia) Henry Vanegas | June 2002 | |
| Alianza F.C. | (El Salvador) Juan Ramon Paredes | TBD | June 2002 | (Colombia) German Guiterrez | July 2002 | |
| Firpo | (El Salvador) Abraham Vasquez | TBD | June 2002 | (Federal Republic of Yugoslavia) Miloš Miljanić | July 2002 | |

=== During the season ===
| Team | Outgoing manager | Manner of departure | Date of vacancy | Replaced by | Date of appointment | Position in table |
|---|---|---|---|---|---|---|
| Alianza F.C. | (Colombia) German Guiterrez | TBD | September 2002 | (Chile) Julio Escobar | September 2002 | |
| C.D. Dragon | (Brazil) Antonio Carlos Viera | TBD | September 2002 | (El Salvador) Jose Mario Martinez | September 2002 | |
| Isidro Metapan | (Argentina) Roberto Fabrizio | TBD | September 2002 | (El Salvador) Edwin Portillo | October 2002 | |

== Apertura 2002 Standings ==
Last updated August 3, 2002

| Pos | Team | Pld | W | D | L | GF | GA | GD | Pts | Qualification |
|---|---|---|---|---|---|---|---|---|---|---|
| 1 | C.D. FAS | 18 | 10 | 5 | 3 | 24 | 20 | +4 | 35 | Qualified for semifinals |
| 2 | Municipal Limeño | 18 | 9 | 4 | 5 | 33 | 19 | +14 | 31 | Qualified for semifinals |
| 3 | San Salvador F.C. | 18 | 7 | 7 | 4 | 28 | 21 | +7 | 28 | Qualified for semifinals |
| 4 | C.D. Águila | 18 | 6 | 9 | 3 | 26 | 20 | +6 | 27 | 4th place playoff |
| 5 | C.D. Luis Ángel Firpo | 18 | 7 | 6 | 5 | 23 | 24 | −1 | 27 | 4th place playoff |
| 6 | A.D. Isidro Metapán | 18 | 5 | 6 | 7 | 22 | 24 | −2 | 21 | |
| 7 | C.D. Arcense | 18 | 5 | 6 | 7 | 15 | 17 | −2 | 21 | |
| 8 | C.D. Atlético Balboa | 18 | 4 | 5 | 9 | 21 | 31 | −10 | 17 | |
| 9 | Alianza F.C. | 18 | 3 | 7 | 8 | 17 | 22 | −5 | 16 | |
| 10 | C.D. Dragón | 18 | 3 | 7 | 8 | 20 | 31 | −11 | 16 | |

== 4th place playoff ==
December 8, 2002

| C.D. Águila | 1-3 | C.D. Luis Ángel Firpo |

== Semifinals 1st leg ==
December 12, 2002

| San Salvador F.C. | 4-3 | Municipal Limeño |

December 12, 2002

| C.D. Luis Ángel Firpo | 0-2 | C.D. FAS |

== Semifinals 2nd leg ==
December 9, 2006

| Municipal Limeño | 2-1 (pen 2-3) | San Salvador F.C. |

December 15, 2002

| C.D. FAS | 3-0 | C.D. Luis Ángel Firpo |

== Final ==
December 22, 2002

| C.D. FAS | 3-1 | San Salvador F.C. |
|---|---|---|
| Williams Reyes 6', 15' (pen.) & 51' | | Orlando Garcés 5' |

Estadio Cuscatlán

C.D. FAS
| GK | 1 | (El Salvador) Luis Castro |
| RB | 2 | (El Salvador) Víctor Velásquez |
| CB | 31 | (El Salvador) Marvin González |
| CB | 13 | (El Salvador) Daniel Sagastizado (substituted off) 54' |
| LB | 3 | (El Salvador) William Osorio |
| DM | 21 | (El Salvador) Ernesto Góchez (substituted off) 74' |
| RM | 8 | (El Salvador) Jorge "Zarco" Rodríguez |
| LM | 20 | (El Salvador) Gilberto Murgas (yellow card) 44' |
| AM | 22 | (El Salvador) Alfredo Pacheco (yellow card) 40' |
| CF | 7 | (Honduras) Williams Reyes (substituted off) 85' |
| CF | 11 | (Argentina) Alejandro Bentos (yellow card) 90' |
Substitutes:
| DF | 10 | (El Salvador) Cristian Álvarez (substituted off) 54' |
| MF | 10 | (El Salvador) Carlos Menjívar (substituted on) 74' |
| FW | 10 | (El Salvador) Juan Carlos López (substituted on) 85' |
Manager:
(Peru) Agustín Castillo

San Salvador F.C.:
| GK | 1 | (El Salvador) Álvaro Misael Alfaro |
| RB | 3 | (El Salvador) William Torres (yellow card) 30' |
| CB | 23 | (El Salvador) Mario Mayén Meza |
| CB | 4 | (Colombia) Orlando Garcés |
| LB | 21 | (El Salvador) Nelson Flores (substituted off) 75' |
| DM | 14 | (El Salvador) Carlos Gómez Navas (substituted off) 59' |
| RM | 10 | (Argentina) Rodrigo Lagos (substituted off) 46' |
| CM | 8 | (El Salvador) Dennis Alas (yellow card) 59' |
| LM | 6 | (Argentina) Emiliano Pedrozo |
| SS | 7 | (Colombia) Alexander Obregón |
| CF | 5 | (Honduras) Franklin Webster |
Substitutes:
| DF | 17 | (El Salvador) Julio Rivas (substituted off) 46' |
| MF | 16 | (El Salvador) Víctor Merino Dubón (substituted off) 59' |
| MF | 16 | (El Salvador) José Marroquín (substituted off) 75' (yellow card) 75' |
Manager:
(Uruguay) Rubén Alonso

Primera División Apertura 2002 champions

13th title

== List of foreign players in the league ==
This is a list of foreign players in Apertura 2002. The following players:

1. have played at least one apertura game for the respective club.
2. have not been capped for the El Salvador national football team on any level, independently from the birthplace

C.D. Águila

- (Brazil) Alexandre Pinto Larangueira
- (Brazil) Severino Piñeiro
- (Brazil) Alexander Prediguer
- (Brazil) Toninho Dos Santos
- (Brazil) Sandro Machado Tavares
- (Brazil) Mauro Nunez
- (Uruguay) Darío Larrosa

Alianza F.C.

- (Argentina) Martín Claudio Sosa
- (Colombia) Marcelino Renterí
- (Colombia) Hermes Martínez Misal
- (Colombia) Martin Garcia

Atletico Balboa

- (Brazil) Alessandro Rodríguez
- (Colombia) Luis Carlos Asprilla
- (Colombia) Santiago Rodríguez Silva
- (Honduras) Ernesto Noel Aquino
- (Peru) Jair Camero

Arcense

- (Colombia) John Polo
- (Colombia) Edilson Chávez
- (Colombia) Libardo Carvajal
- (Honduras) Christian Mitri
- (Honduras) German Rodríguez

Dragon

- (Brazil) José Caicedo
- (Colombia) Luis Marines
- (Colombia) Andrés Molina
- (Honduras) Eduardo Arriola
- (Honduras) Óscar Lagos

(player released mid season) (player Injured mid season) Injury replacement player

C.D. FAS

- (Argentina) Alejandro de la Cruz Bentos
- (Honduras) Williams Reyes
- (Costa Rica) Rolando Corella
- (Colombia) Víctor Hugo Mafla

C.D. Luis Ángel Firpo

- (Argentina) Juan Carlos Graf
- (Colombia) Norman García
- (Colombia) Frank Rengifo
- (Colombia) Henry Sevillano
- (Colombia) Max Torres
- (Colombia) Juan Pablo Chacón

A.D. Isidro Metapán

- (Argentina) Cristian Javier Zamudio
- (Argentina) Diego Alvarez
- (Argentina) Diego Oyarbide
- (Argentina) Luciano Suárez
- (Colombia) Alonso Alcibar
- (Brazil) Anderson Batista
- (Honduras) Jorge Wagner

Municipal Limeno

- (Brazil) Paulo César Rodrigues
- (Uruguay) Raul Falero
- (Colombia) Jorge Sandoval
- (Colombia) Hugo Viveros

San Salvador F.C.

- (Argentina) Rodrigo Lagos
- (Argentina) Emiliano Pedrozo
- (Colombia) Alexander Obregon
- (Colombia) Orlando Garces
- (Honduras) Franklin Webster
