= Primera División de Fútbol Profesional – Clausura 2000 =

Primera División de El Salvador
- Champions: C.D. Luis Ángel Firpo (7th title)
- Relegated: None
- None: None
- Top goalscorer: (El Salvador) Carlos Francisco Contreras (11)

The Primera División de Fútbol Profesional Clausura 2000 season (officially "Copa Clima Clausura 2000") started on January 15, 2000, and finished on July 1, 2000.

The season saw C.D. Luis Angel Firpo win its th league title after a 10-9 penalty victory over ADET in the final after the game was ted at 1-1.

== Team information ==
=== Personnel and sponsoring ===
| Team | Chairman | Head coach | Kitmaker | Shirt sponsor |
|---|---|---|---|---|
| ADET | (El Salvador) Hector Palomo Sol | (Argentina) Juan Quarterone | Garcis | Dilsur |
| Águila | (El Salvador) Alejandro González | (Argentina) Hugo Coria | Joma | Gigante Express, Oralite |
| Alianza | (El Salvador) Óscar Rodríguez | (Italy) Reno Renucci | TBD | TBD |
| Atlético Marte | (El Salvador) TBD | (El Salvador) Juan Ramón Paredes | TBD | TBD |
| C.D. Dragon | (El Salvador) TBD | (Paraguay) Santos Claudio Gonzale | TBD | TBD |
| FAS | (El Salvador) Reynaldo Valle | (El Salvador) Rubén Guevara | Milan | LG |
| C.D. Juventud Olímpica Metalio | (El Salvador) TBD | (El Salvador) Luis Angel leon | Garcis | TBD |
| Firpo | (El Salvador) Josef Arguedas | (Paraguay) Nelson Brizuela | Galaxia | Casino Colonia |
| Municipal Limeno | (El Salvador) TBD | (Uruguay) Ruben Alonso | TBD | TBD |
| Santa Clara | (El Salvador) TBD | (El Salvador) Manuel Mejía y Pedro Interiano | TBD | TBD |

== Managerial changes ==
=== Before the start of the season ===
| Team | Outgoing manager | Manner of departure | Date of vacancy | Replaced by | Date of appointment | Position in table |
|---|---|---|---|---|---|---|
| Dragon | (Paraguay) Nelson Brizuela | TBD | January 2000 | (Paraguay) Santos Claudio Gonzalez | 2000 | th (Apertura 1999) |
| C.D. Municipal Limeno | (El Salvador) Oscar Emigdio Benítez | TBD | January 2000 | (Uruguay) Ruben Alonso | January 2000 | 2nd (Apertura 1999) |
| LA Firpo | (Chile) Julio Escobar | TBD | January 2000 | (Paraguay) Nelson Brizuela | January 2000 | 9th (Apertura 1999) |
| Juventud Olimpico Metalio | (Paraguay) TBD | TBD | January 2000 | (El Salvador) Nestor Olla | 2000 | th (Apertura 1999) |

=== During the season ===
| Team | Outgoing manager | Manner of departure | Date of vacancy | Replaced by | Date of appointment | Position in table |
|---|---|---|---|---|---|---|
| Alianza | (Mexico) Reno Renucci | Sacked | March 2000 | (Argentina) Alfredo Obberti | March 2000 | |
| Santa Clara | (El Salvador) Manuel Mejía y Pedro Interiano | Sacked | 16 March 2000 | (El Salvador) Saul Molina | March 2000 | |
| Dragon | (Paraguay) Santos Claudio Gonzalez | Sacked | March 2000 | (El Salvador) Mauricio Alvarega | March 2000 | |
| LA Firpo | (Paraguay) Nelson Brizuela | Sacked | April 2000 | (Chile) Julio Escobar | May 2000 | |
| FAS | (El Salvador) Rubén Guevara | Sacked | March 2000 | (El Salvador) Ricardo Mena Laguna | March 2000 | |
| FAS | (El Salvador) Ricardo Mena Laguna | Sacked | June 2000 | (Brazil) Odir Jacques | June 2000 | |

== Notable events ==
=== Deaths ===
- Helio Rodriguez (Brazilian ex player Atletico Marte, Alianza, Sonsonate, Aguila, and Universidad de El Salvador

== League standings ==
| Pos | Team | Pld | W | D | L | GF | GA | GD | Pts | Qualification or relegation |
|---|---|---|---|---|---|---|---|---|---|---|
| 1 | C.D. Águila | 18 | 8 | 7 | 3 | 29 | 17 | +12 | 31 | Qualified to finals |
| 2 | ADET | 18 | 8 | 6 | 4 | 30 | 19 | +11 | 30 | Qualified to finals |
| 3 | C.D. FAS | 18 | 8 | 5 | 5 | 29 | 19 | +10 | 29 | Qualified to finals |
| 4 | C.D. Luis Ángel Firpo | 18 | 8 | 5 | 5 | 23 | 15 | +8 | 29 | Qualified to finals |
| 5 | Alianza F.C. | 18 | 8 | 5 | 5 | 33 | 21 | +12 | 29 | |
| 6 | C.D. Municipal Limeño | 18 | 5 | 9 | 4 | 17 | 21 | −4 | 24 | |
| 7 | C.D. Dragón | 18 | 5 | 6 | 7 | 21 | 27 | −6 | 21 | |
| 8 | Atlético Marte | 18 | 3 | 10 | 5 | 20 | 27 | −7 | 19 | |
| 9 | C.D. Juventud Olímpica Metalio | 18 | 2 | 7 | 9 | 19 | 38 | −19 | 13 | |
| 10 | C.D. Santa Clara | 18 | 2 | 6 | 10 | 16 | 33 | −17 | 12 | Relegated to Segunda Division |

Source: https://www.rsssf.org/tablese/elsal00.html

== Semifinals 1st leg ==
June 22, 2000

| C.D. Luis Ángel Firpo | 2-2 | C.D. Águila |
|---|---|---|
| Misael Alfaro (pen.), 38'; Mauricio Dos Santos 73' | | Paul Cominges 11' 48' |

Estadio Nacional de la Flor Blanca

June 22, 2000

| C.D. FAS | 2-0 | ADET |
|---|---|---|
| Marlon Medrano 25' 80' | | None |

Estadio Nacional de la Flor Blanca

== Semifinals 2nd leg ==
June 23, 2000

| Aguila | 0-2 | LA Firpo |
|---|---|---|
| None | | Mauricio Dos Santos 50'; Washington Hernández 75' |

Estadio Nacional de la Flor Blanca

LA Firpo won 4-2 on aggregate

June 23, 2000

| ADET | 2-0 | FAS |
|---|---|---|
| René Martínez 41'; Juan Carlos Panameño 68' | | None |

Estadio Nacional de la Flor Blanca

ADET won on aggregate'

== Final ==
July 1, 2000

| ADET | 1-1 | C.D. Luis Ángel Firpo |
|---|---|---|
| Juan Carlos Panameño 61' (pen.) | | Mauricio Dos Santos 39' |
Penalties
| Chico Contreras (penalty scored); Juan Carlos Panameño (penalty scored); Salvador Alfaro (penalty scored); René Anzora (penalty scored); Mario Sigüenza (penalty missed); Elmer Tobar (penalty scored); Efraín Gutiérrez (penalty scored); Wilbert Martínez (penalty missed); Miguel Montes (penalty scored); Carlos Arévalo (penalty scored); Héctor Eduardo Cocherari (penalty scored); Juan Carlos Panameño (penalty missed) | 9-10 | Misael Alfaro (penalty missed); René Durán (penalty scored); Celio Rodriguez (penalty scored); Carlos Castro Borja (penalty scored); Raul Toro (penalty scored); Washington Hernández (penalty scored); Hector Canjura (penalty scored); Leonel Carcamo (penalty missed); Abraham Monterrosa (penalty scored); Rafael Tobar (penalty scored); Mauricio Do Santos (penalty scored); Raul Toro (penalty scored) |

Estadio Nacional de la Flor Blanca

ADET
| GK | (El Salvador) Miguel Montes |
| DF | (El Salvador) Salvador Alfaro |
| DF | (El Salvador) Efraín Gutiérrez | Substituted off |
| DF | (El Salvador) Juan Carlos Gil | Substituted off |
| DF | (El Salvador) Wilbert Martínez |
| MF | (El Salvador) Juan Carlos Panameño |
| MF | (El Salvador) Mauricio Qunitanilla |
| MF | (El Salvador) Héctor Eduardo Cocherari |
| MF | (El Salvador) René Valderrama Martínez | Substituted off |
| FW | (El Salvador) Francisco Contreras |
| FW | (El Salvador) Mario Sigüenza |
Substitutes:
| FW | (El Salvador) Elmer Tobar | Substituted on |
| MF | (El Salvador) Carlos Arévalo | Substituted on |
| MF | (El Salvador) René Anzora | Substituted on |
Manager:
(Argentina) Juan Quarterone

Firpo:
| GK | (El Salvador) Misael Alfaro |
| DF | (El Salvador) Rafael Tobar |
| DF | (El Salvador) Leonel Carcamo |
| DF | (Brazil) Mauricio Do Santos |
| DF | (El Salvador) Nelson Quintanilla | Substituted off |
| DF | (El Salvador) Nelson Montoya | Substituted off |
| MF | (El Salvador) Abraham Monterrosa |
| MF | (El Salvador) Carlos Castro Borja |
| MF | (El Salvador) Hector Canjura |
| FW | (Brazil) Celio Rodriguez |
| FW | (Uruguay) Washington Hernández |
Substitutes:
| MF | (El Salvador) René Durán | Substituted on |
| FW | (Chile) Raul Toro | Substituted on |
Manager:
(Chile) Julio Escobar

Clausura 2000 champion

7th title

== List of foreign players in the league ==
This is a list of foreign players in Clausura 2000. The following players:

1. have played at least one apertura game for the respective club.
2. have not been capped for the El Salvador national football team on any level, independently from the birthplace

ADET

- (Guatemala) Edward Cocherari
- (Guatemala) Adrian Vera

C.D. Águila

- (Argentina) Carlos Daniel Escalante
- (Argentina) Pedro Cardozo
- (Argentina) Gabriel Lučić
- (Argentina) Sergio Ibarra
- (Brazil) Marcio Sampaio
- (Peru) Paul Cominges

Alianza F.C.

- (Argentina) Cecilio Galeano
- (Brazil) Alex Carioca
- (Brazil) Agnaldo Oliveira
- (Brazil) Alexandro Martin
- (Uruguay) Alejandro Curbelo

Atletico Marte

- (Dominican Republic) Óscar Mejía
- (Brazil) Alex Norival Machado
- (Peru) Pedro Salazar

Dragon

- (Brazil) Marco De Oliveira
- (Brazil) Roberto da Silva
- (Honduras) German Rodriguez
- (Paraguay) Edgar Álvarez Fleitas
- (South Africa) Mothar Kante Kabu

(player released mid season) (player Injured mid season) Injury replacement player

C.D. FAS

- (Argentina) Emiliano Pedrozo
- (Brazil) Marco Soares
- (Brazil) Alemán Borman
- (Honduras) Miguel Mariano
- (Honduras) Jorge Wagner
- (Peru) Antonio Serrano

Juventud Olimpica Metalio

- (Brazil) Marcos Tertuliano

C.D. Luis Ángel Firpo

- (Brazil) Mauricio Do Santos
- (Chile) Raul Toro
- (Uruguay) Washington Hernández

Municipal Limeno

- (Colombia) Carlos Villarreal
- (Peru) Jahir Camero
- (Peru) César Charum
- (Mexico) Roberto Ventura
- (Paraguay) Arnaldo Ferreira
- (Costa Rica) Carlos Pancita Rodríguez Marín

Santa Clara

- (Colombia) Edgar Montaño
- (Honduras) Mario Pavón

== Aggregate table ==
| Pos | Team | Pld | W | D | L | GF | GA | GD | Pts | Qualification or relegation |
|---|---|---|---|---|---|---|---|---|---|---|
| 1 | C.D. Águila | 36 | 17 | 13 | 6 | 61 | 29 | +32 | 64 | |
| 2 | C.D. FAS | 36 | 17 | 8 | 11 | 58 | 33 | +25 | 59 | |
| 3 | Alianza F.C. | 36 | 16 | 11 | 9 | 52 | 32 | +20 | 59 | |
| 4 | C.D. Municipal Limeño | 36 | 15 | 14 | 7 | 40 | 33 | +7 | 59 | |
| 5 | C.D. Luis Ángel Firpo | 36 | 15 | 10 | 11 | 44 | 31 | +13 | 55 | |
| 6 | ADET | 36 | 14 | 12 | 10 | 50 | 38 | +12 | 54 | |
| 7 | C.D. Dragón | 36 | 10 | 12 | 14 | 39 | 47 | −8 | 42 | |
| 8 | Atlético Marte | 36 | 6 | 18 | 12 | 37 | 52 | −15 | 36 | |
| 9 | C.D. Santa Clara | 36 | 8 | 8 | 20 | 34 | 62 | −28 | 32 | Relegation Playoff |
| 10 | Juventud Olimpica | 36 | 4 | 10 | 22 | 27 | 85 | −58 | 22 | Relegated to Segunda División |

Source: https://www.rsssf.org/tablese/elsal00.html

== Top scorers ==
| Pos | Player | Team | Goals |
|---|---|---|---|
| 1. | (El Salvador) Carlos Francisco Contreras | ADET | 11 |
| 2. | (El Salvador) TBD | TBD | - |
| 3. | (El Salvador) TBD | TBD | - |
| 4. | (El Salvador) TBD | TBD | - |
| 5. | (Peru) Paul Cominges | Aguila | 6 |
| 6. | (Brazil) Celio Rodriguez | LA Firpo | 5 |
