= Primera División de Fútbol Profesional Clausura 2003 =

Primera División de Fútbol de El Salvador
- Champions: San Salvador F.C.(1st title)
- Relegated: C.D. Dragon
- Top goalscorer: TBD (12)

The Primera División de Fútbol Profesional Clausura 2003 season (officially "Torneo Apertura 2002") started on January 21, 2003.

The season was composed of the following clubs:

- C.D. FAS
- Municipal Limeño
- San Salvador F.C.
- C.D. Águila
- C.D. Luis AngelFirpo
- A.D. Isidro Metapán
- C.D. Atlético Balboa
- Alianza F.C.
- C.D. Arcense
- C.D. Dragón

== Team information ==
=== Personnel and sponsoring ===
Team	Chairman	Head coach	Kitmaker	Shirt sponsor
Águila	(El Salvador)	(Honduras) Ramón Maradiaga	TBD	TBD
Alianza	(El Salvador) Ricardo Padilla Pinto	(Argentina) Juan Quarterone	TBD	TBD
Atletico Balboa	(El Salvador) Noel Benítez	(Paraguay) Nelson Brizuela	TBD	TBD
C.D. Arcense	(El Salvador) TBD	(El Salvador) Ricardo Guardado	TBD	TBD
C.D. Dragon	(El Salvador) Domingo Ramos	(El Salvador) Jose Mario Martinez	TBD	TBD
FAS	(El Salvador) Reynaldo Valle	(Peru) Agustín Castillo	TBD	TBD
Firpo	(El Salvador) TBD	(Serbia and Montenegro) Milos Mijanic	TBD	TBD
Isidro Metapan	(El Salvador) José Gumercindo Landaverde	(El Salvador) Edwin Portillo	TBD	TBD
Municipal Limeno	(El Salvador) Gumercindo Ventura	(Colombia) Henry Vanegas	Galaxia	LG
San Salvador F.C.	(El Salvador) Marco Flores	(Uruguay) Ruben Alonso	TBD	TBD

== Managerial changes ==
=== Before the season ===
Team	Outgoing manager	Manner of departure	Date of vacancy	Replaced by	Date of appointment	Position in table
Aguila	(Argentina) Hugo Coria	Resigned	December 2002	(Honduras) Ramón Maradiaga	Jan 2003	
Atletico Balboa	(Argentina) Juan Quarterone	TBD	NOV 2002	(Paraguay) Nelson Brizuela	Jan 2003	
Alianza F.C.	(Chile) Julio Escobar	TBD	December 2002	(Argentina) Juan Quarterone	Jan 2002	

=== During the season ===
Team	Outgoing manager	Manner of departure	Date of vacancy	Replaced by	Date of appointment	Position in table
Municipal Limeno	(Colombia) Henry Vanegas	TBD	April 2003	(Brazil) Antonio Carlos Viera	April 2003	
C.D. Dragon	(El Salvador) Jose Mario Martinez	TBD	April 2003	(El Salvador) Domingo Ramos Interim	April 2003	
Atletico Balboa	(Paraguay) Nelson Brizuela	TBD	April 2003	(Italy) (Argentina) Carlos Barone	April 2003	
Atletico Balboa	(Italy) (Argentina) Carlos Barone	TBD	April 2003	(Costa Rica) Manuel Alberto Solano	April 2003	

== Clausura 2002 standings ==
Last updated August 3, 2002

Pos	Team	Pld	W	D	L	GF	GA	GD	Pts	Qualification or relegation
1	C.D. FAS	18	13	5	0	35	12	+23	44	
2	San Salvador F.C.	18	7	7	4	29	26	+3	28	
3	Alianza F.C.	18	6	10	2	23	20	+3	28	
4	C.D. Luis Ángel Firpo	18	7	6	5	25	21	+4	27	
5	A.D. Isidro Metapán	18	6	8	4	24	18	+6	26	
6	Municipal Limeño	18	6	6	6	34	27	+7	24	
7	C.D. Águila	18	6	4	8	28	27	+1	22	
8	C.D. Atlético Balboa	18	3	9	6	15	28	−13	18	
9	C.D. Arcense	18	1	8	9	10	19	−9	11	
10	C.D. Dragón	18	1	5	12	18	43	−25	8	Relegated to Segunda División de Fútbol Salvadoreño

== Semifinals 1st leg ==
June 1, 2003

Alianza F.C.	2-2	San Salvador F.C.

June 1, 2003

C.D. Luis Ángel Firpo	2-1	C.D. FAS

== Semifinals 2nd leg ==
June 8, 2003

San Salvador F.C.	2-1	Alianza F.C.
Garcés 19'; Víctor Merino 90'		Pedrozo 74'

June 8, 2003

C.D. FAS	2-1 pen (3-4)	C.D. Luis Ángel Firpo
Bentos 81'; Murgas 90'		Sevillano 91'

== Final ==
June 15, 2003

San Salvador F.C.	3-1 (AET)	C.D. Luis Ángel Firpo
Guillermo Morán 7' (o.g.); Víctor Merino 113'; José Martínez 116'		Santos Cabrera 48'

Luis Ángel Firpo
GK	(El Salvador) Fidel Mondragón
RB	(El Salvador) Mauricio Quintanilla (substituted off)
CB	(Colombia) Juan Pablo Chacón
CB	(Colombia) Gustavo Cabrera
LB	(El Salvador) Jorge Edenilson Sánchez
DM	(El Salvador) Guillermo García
RM	(El Salvador) Guillermo Morán (substituted off)
LM	(El Salvador) Héctor Canjura
AM	(El Salvador) Isaac Zelaya
CF	(Brazil) Israel Castro Franco
CF	(Brazil) Celio Rodriguez
Substitutes:
DF	(El Salvador) Santos Cabrera (substituted on)
MF	(El Salvador) Henry Sevillano (substituted on)
Manager:
(Serbia and Montenegro) Milos Miljanic

San Salvador F.C.:
GK	(El Salvador) Misael Alfaro
RB	(El Salvador) Carlos Gómez Navas (substituted off)
CB	(El Salvador) Mario Mayén Meza
CB	(Colombia) Orlando Garcés
LB	(El Salvador) Selvin Zepeda
DM	(El Salvador) Nelson Flores (substituted off)
RM	(Argentina) Rodrigo Lagos
CM	(Argentina) Emiliano Pedrozo
LM	(El Salvador) Herber Burgos
SS	(Colombia) Alexander Obregón
CF	(Honduras) Franklin Webster (substituted off)
Substitutes:
DF	(El Salvador) William Torres (substituted on)
MF	(El Salvador) Víctor Merino (substituted on)
FW	(El Salvador) José Martínez (substituted on)
Manager:
(Uruguay) Rubén Alonso

Clausura Champions 2002/03

1st title

== List of foreign players in the league ==
This is a list of foreign players in Clausura 2003. The following players:

1. have played at least one apertura game for the respective club.
2. have not been capped for the El Salvador national football team on any level, independently from the birthplace

C.D. Águila

- (Brazil) Andre Luiz Vieira
- (Brazil) Alexander Prediguer
- (Brazil) Marcio Sampaio
- (Uruguay) Darío Larrosa
- (Uruguay) Luis Almada

Alianza F.C.

- (Argentina) Diego De Rosa
- (Argentina) Gustavo Fuentes
- (Honduras) Elvis Scott
- (Honduras) Abel Rodríguez
- (Uruguay) Luis Espindola

Atletico Balboa

- (Colombia) Luis Carlos Asprilla
- (Colombia) Juan Carlos Mosquera
- (Colombia) Santiago Rodríguez
- (Honduras) Ernesto Aquino
- (Honduras) Camilo Bonilla
- (Bolivia) Enzo Calderon

Arcense

- (Colombia) John Polo
- (Colombia) Nito Gonzales
- (Colombia) Libardo Carvajal
- (Colombia) Gerson Mier

Dragon

- (Brazil) Ducivan De Sousa
- (Colombia) John Elder Castillo
- (Honduras) Eduardo Arriola
- (Honduras) Alberto Guity
- (Bolivia) Joshua Vaca

(player released mid season) (player Injured mid season) Injury replacement player

C.D. FAS

- (Argentina) Alejandro Bentos
- (Colombia) Walter Escobar
- (Colombia) Victor Hugo Mafla
- (Honduras) Williams Reyes
- (Peru) Pedro Prado

C.D. Luis Ángel Firpo

- (Brazil) Paulo César Rodrigues Lima
- (Colombia) Henry Sevillano
- (Colombia) Juan Pablo Chacón
- (Colombia) Gustavo Cabrera
- (Peru) Frank Palomino

A.D. Isidro Metapán

- (Argentina) Diego Alvarez
- (Colombia) Wilson Sanchez
- (Honduras) Marvin Orlando Brown
- (Honduras) Noel Flores
- (Honduras) Jorge Wagner

Municipal Limeno

- (Brazil) Marcelo Marquez
- (Colombia) Jorge Sandoval
- (Honduras) Fabian Andres Perez
- (Peru) César Charún
- (Peru) Aldo Cavero

San Salvador F.C.

- (Argentina) Rodrigo Lagos
- (Argentina) Emiliano Pedrozo
- (Colombia) Alexander Obregon
- (Colombia) Orlando Garces
- (Honduras) Franklin Webster
