= Primera División de Fútbol Profesional Clausura 2007 =

Primera División de Fútbol Profesional de El Salvador
- Champions: A.D. Isidro Metapán (1st title)
- Relegated: Independiente Nacional 1906
- Top goalscorer: TBD

The Primera División de Fútbol Profesional Clausura 2007 season (officially "Clausura 2007") was the 36th since its establishment in 1969.

It started on 24 February 2007 and ended with the final on 1 July 2007.

Isidro Metapan won its first title.

== Clausura 2007 teams ==
Club	City	Stadium
C.D. Águila	San Miguel	Estadio Juan Francisco Barraza
Alianza F.C.	San Salvador	Estadio Cuscatlán
C.D. Chalatenango	Chalatenango	Estadio José Gregorio Martínez
C.D. FAS	Santa Ana	Estadio Oscar Quiteño
C.D. L.A. Firpo	Usulután	Estadio Sergio Torres
Independiente Nacional 1906	San Vicente	Estadio Jiboa
A.D. Isidro Metapán	Metapán	Estadio Jorge Calero Suárez
Once Municipal	Ahuachapán	Estadio Simeón Magaña
San Salvador F.C.	San Salvador	Estadio Cuscatlán
C.D. Vista Hermosa	San Francisco Gotera	Estadio Luis Amílcar Moreno

== Team information ==
=== Personnel and sponsoring ===
Team	Chairman	Head coach	Kitmaker	Shirt sponsor
Águila	(El Salvador)	(Panama) Gary Stempel	TBD	TBD
Alianza	(El Salvador)	(Paraguay) Nelson Brizuela	TBD	TBD
C.D. Chalatenango	(El Salvador)	(Peru) Agustín Castillo		
FAS	(El Salvador) Reynaldo Valle	(Argentina) Julio Asad	TBD	TBD
Firpo	(El Salvador) TBD	(El Salvador) Leonel Carcamo	TBD	TBD
Independiente Nacional 1906	(El Salvador)	(Argentina) Juan Quarterone	TBD	TBD
Isidro Metapan	(El Salvador)	(El Salvador) Edwin Portillo	TBD	TBD
Once Municipal	(El Salvador) TBD	(El Salvador) Nelson Mauricio Ancheta	TBD	TBD
San Salvador F.C.	(El Salvador) Marco Flores	(El Salvador) Antonio Orellana Rico	TBD	TBD
C.D. Vista Hermosa	(El Salvador) TBD	(El Salvador) Jose Mario Martinez	TBD	TBD

== Managerial changes ==
=== Before the season ===
Team	Outgoing manager	Manner of departure	Date of vacancy	Replaced by	Date of appointment	Position in table
San Salvador F.C.	(Argentina) Hugo Coria	TBD	November 2006	(El Salvador) Antonio Orellana Rico	January 2007	
Aguila	(Serbia) Vladan Vicevic	TBD	December 2006	(Panama) Gary Stempel	January 2007	

=== During the season ===
Team	Outgoing manager	Manner of departure	Date of vacancy	Replaced by	Date of appointment	Position in table
Firpo	(El Salvador) Leonel Carcamo	TBD	March 2007	(Argentina) Hugo Coria	March 2007	
Independiente Nacional 1906	(Argentina) Juan Quarterone	TBD	March 2007	(Uruguay) Ruben Alonso	April 2007	
C.D. Aguila	(Panama) Gary Stempel	TBD	April 2007	(El Salvador) Luis Ramirez Zapata	April 2007	
San Salvador F.C.	(El Salvador) Antonio Orellana Rico	TBD	April 2007	(Uruguay) Saul Rivero	April 2007	
C.D. Vista Hermosa	(El Salvador) Jose Mario Martinez	TBD	May 2007	(Argentina) Jorge Alberto Garcia	May 2007	

== Apertura 2006 standings ==
Last updated December 4, 2006

Pos	Team	Pld	W	D	L	GF	GA	GD	Pts	Qualification or relegation
1	C.D. Luis AngelFirpo	18	9	6	3	27	19	+8	33	
2	A.D. Isidro Metapán	19	8	6	5	34	27	+7	30	
3	Once Municipal	18	6	9	3	17	12	+5	27	
4	C.D. Águila	18	8	2	8	34	29	+5	26	
5	C.D. FAS	18	6	6	6	21	21	0	24	
6	C.D. Chalatenango	18	7	3	8	21	26	−5	24	
7	San Salvador F.C.	18	6	5	7	21	25	−4	23	
8	C.D. Vista Hermosa	18	6	4	8	23	28	−5	22	
9	Alianza F.C.	18	5	5	8	16	18	−2	20	
10	Independiente Nacional 1906	18	4	5	9	16	27	−11	17	Relegated to Segunda División de Fútbol Salvadoreño

== Top scorers ==
Pos.	Nat.	Player	Team	Goals
1	(Argentina)	Mario Alejandro Costas	C.D. Luis AngelFirpo	7
2	(El Salvador)	Cesar Larios	C.D. FAS	6
3	(El Salvador)	Rudis Corrales	C.D. Águila	5
4	(Panama)	Nicolás Muñoz	C.D. Águila	5
5	(Brazil)	José Eduardo Mendez	C.D. Chalatenango	5
6	(Argentina)	Alejandro Bentos	C.D. FAS	5
7	(Colombia)	Cristian Gil Mosquera	C.D. Vista Hermosa	5
8	(Argentina)	Patricio Gomez Barroche	C.D. Vista Hermosa	5
9	(Honduras)	Williams Reyes	A.D. Isidro Metapán	4
10	(El Salvador)	Emiliano Pedrozo	A.D. Isidro Metapán	4
11	(El Salvador)	Eliseo Quintanilla	San Salvador F.C.	4

== Bracket ==
Semifinals (agg)
1	C.D. Luis AngelFirpo	3
4	C.D. Águila	3
3	Once Municipal	3
2	A.D. Isidro Metapán	5

Final
C.D. Luis AngelFirpo	0
A.D. Isidro Metapán	1

== Semifinals 1st leg ==
17 June 2007

C.D. Águila	0-2	C.D. Luis Ángel Firpo

Estadio Juan Francisco Barraza, San Miguel

17 June 2007

Once Municipal	2-1	A.D. Isidro Metapán

== Semifinals 2nd leg ==
24 June 2007

C.D. Luis Ángel Firpo	1-3	C.D. Águila

23 June 2007

A.D. Isidro Metapán	4-1	Once Municipal

== Final ==
1 July 2007

C.D. Luis Ángel Firpo	0–1 (a.e.t.)	A.D. Isidro Metapán
		Fabinho 119'

Firpo
GK	(El Salvador) Fidel Mondragón
DF	(El Salvador) Mauricio Quintanilla
DF	(El Salvador) Manuel Salazar
DF	(El Salvador) Edwin Gonzalez
DF	(El Salvador) Jorge Elenilson Sánchez
MF	(El Salvador) Francisco Medrano
MF	(El Salvador) Eduardo Campos	Substituted off
MF	(El Salvador) Guillermo Moran
MF	(Argentina) Leonardo Pekarnik	Substituted off
FW	(Argentina) Fernando Leguizamón
FW	(Argentina) Mario Costas	Substituted off
Substitutes:
FW	(El Salvador) Manuel Martínez	Substituted on
MF	(El Salvador) Cristian Sánchez	Substituted on
MF	(El Salvador) Víctor Merino	Substituted on
Manager:
(Argentina) Hugo Coria

Metapán:
GK	(El Salvador) Misael Alfaro
DF	(El Salvador) René Alexander Ramos
DF	(El Salvador) Alexander Escobar
DF	(El Salvador) Erick Dowson Prado
DF	(El Salvador) Ernesto Iraheta
DF	(El Salvador) Julio Enrique Martínez	Substituted on
MF	(El Salvador) Alexander Amaya del Cid
MF	(El Salvador) Héctor Omar Mejía
MF	(Argentina) Emiliano Pedrozo
FW	(El Salvador) Williams Reyes
FW	(Argentina) Carlos Alberto Gómez	Substituted on
Substitutes:
DF	(Brazil) / (Togo) Fabinho	Substituted on
FW	(El Salvador) José Luis Ramos	Substituted on
Manager:
(El Salvador) Edwin Portillo

Clausura Champions 2007

1st title

== List of foreign players in the league ==
This is a list of foreign players in Clausura 2007. The following players:

1. have played at least one apertura game for the respective club.
2. have not been capped for the El Salvador national football team on any level, independently from the birthplace

A new rule was introduced this season that clubs can only have three foreign players per club and can only add a new player if there is an injury or player/s is released.

C.D. Águila

- (Honduras) Fabio Ulloa
- (Panama) Nicolás Muñoz
- (Panama) Juan Ramon Solís
- (Panama) Eduardo Jiménez

Alianza F.C.

- (Costa Rica) Jhonny Woodly
- (Paraguay) Miguel Domínguez
- (Panama) Anel Canales
- (Mexico) Arturo Albarrán

Chalatenango

- (Honduras) Franklin Webster
- (Brazil) Marcelo Messias
- (Colombia) Juan Camilo Mejía
- (Brazil) José Eduardo Mendez

C.D. FAS

- (Argentina) Pedro Aguirrez
- (Argentina) Alejandro Bentos
- (Argentina) Agustin Lastagaray
- (Paraguay) Nestor Ayala

C.D. Luis Ángel Firpo

- (Colombia) Hermes Martinez
- (Argentina) Fernando Leguizamón
- (Argentina) Leonardo Pekarnik
- (Argentina) Mario Alejandro Costas

(player released mid season) Injury replacement player

Independiente Nacional 1906

- (Colombia) Alexander Obregón
- (Colombia) Miguel Solis
- (Colombia) Eider Mosquera
- (Nicaragua) Emilio Palacios

A.D. Isidro Metapán

- (Brazil) / (Togo) Fabinho
- (Argentina) Carlos Alberto Gómez
- (Uruguay) Paolo Suarez
- (Honduras) Williams Reyes

Once Municipal

- (Panama) Francisco Portillo
- (Colombia) Jairo Hurtado
- (Honduras) Ernesto Noel Aquino
- (Colombia) Libardo Barbajal

San Salvador F.C.

- (Uruguay) Andrés Berrueta
- (Uruguay) Luis Espíndola
- (Colombia) Wilber Sánchez
- (Colombia) Andrés Medina

Vista Hermosa

- (Argentina) Patricio Barroche
- (Colombia) Cristian Mosquera
- (Colombia) Elder Figueroa
- (Colombia) Luis Torres Rodriguez
