= 2002 UNCAF Interclub Cup =

Copa Interclubes UNCAF 2002

Tournament details
- Dates: 9 October – 22 December
- Teams: 12 (from 6 countries)

Final positions
- Champions: (Costa Rica) Alajuelense (2nd title)
- Runners-up: (Panama) Arabe Unido
- Third place: (Honduras) Motagua
- Fourth place: (Guatemala) Comunicaciones

Tournament statistics
- Matches played: 24
- Goals scored: 113 (4.71 per match)

The 2002 UNCAF Interclub Cup was the fourth edition of the UNCAF Club Tournament, under the name UNCAF Interclub Cup and the 20th overall; Liga Deportiva Alajuelense from Costa Rica were declared champions for the second time in its history after winning the Final stage, as C.D. Árabe Unido from Panamá and C.D. Motagua from Honduras joined them to the 2003 CONCACAF Champions' Cup.

== Participating teams ==
- (Costa Rica) Alajuelense
- (Costa Rica) Santos de Guápiles
- (El Salvador) Alianza
- (El Salvador) FAS
- (Guatemala) Comunicaciones
- (Guatemala) Municipal
- (Honduras) Marathón
- (Honduras) Motagua
- (Nicaragua) Jalapa
- (Nicaragua) San Marcos
- (Panama) Árabe Unido
- (Panama) Tauro

== First stage ==
=== Group A ===
Pos	Team	Pld	W	D	L	GF	GA	GD	Pts	Qualification
1	Árabe Unido	3	2	0	1	21	1	+20	6	Final stage and 2003 CONCACAF Champions' Cup
2	FAS	3	2	0	1	19	3	+16	6	2003 CONCACAF Champions' Cup
3	Alianza	3	2	0	1	6	3	+3	6	
4	Jalapa	3	0	0	3	1	40	−39	0	

9 October 2002 Round 1	FAS (El Salvador)	0–2	(Panama) Árabe Unido	San Salvador, El Salvador
			Torres 90'; Cerezo 90+2'	Stadium: Estadio Cuscatlán

9 October 2002 Round 1	Alianza (El Salvador)	4–1	(Nicaragua) Jalapa	San Salvador, El Salvador
	Montes 2' 13'; Martínez 80'; Sosa 87'		Róchez 73'	Stadium: Estadio Cuscatlán

11 October 2002 Round 2	FAS (El Salvador)	17–0	(Nicaragua) Jalapa	San Salvador, El Salvador
	Velásquez 4' de la Cruz 6' 11' 25' 87'; Álvarez 17'; Corella 24' 35' 39'; Góchez 31'; Reyes 53' 62' 81' 88'; Murgas 65' (pen.); Panameño 70'; Gómez 78'			Stadium: Estadio Cuscatlán

11 October 2002 Round 2	Alianza (El Salvador)	1–0	(Panama) Árabe Unido	San Salvador, El Salvador
	Martínez 71'			Stadium: Estadio Cuscatlán

13 October 2002 Round 3	Árabe Unido (Panama)	19–0	(Nicaragua) Jalapa	San Salvador, El Salvador
	Pérez 1' 40' 87'; Anderson 8' 42' 49' 64'; Cevallos 11' 13' 29' 56'; Alvarenga 35'; Salinas 37' 84'; Medina 58'; Barrera 76' 83'; García 88' 89'			Stadium: Estadio Cuscatlán

13 October 2002 Round 3	Alianza (El Salvador)	1–2	(El Salvador) FAS	San Salvador, El Salvador
	Montes 36'		Rodríguez 70'; Velásquez 89'	Stadium: Estadio Cuscatlán

=== Group B ===
Pos	Team	Pld	W	D	L	GF	GA	GD	Pts	Qualification
1	Comunicaciones	3	2	0	1	10	4	+6	6	Final stage and 2003 CONCACAF Champions' Cup
2	Municipal	3	2	0	1	9	3	+6	6	2003 CONCACAF Champions' Cup
3	Santos de Guápiles	3	2	0	1	4	4	0	6	
4	San Marcos	3	0	0	3	0	12	−12	0	

23 October 2002 Round 1	Municipal (Guatemala)	4–0	(Nicaragua) San Marcos	Guatemala City, Guatemala
	Zorrilla 5'; Acevedo 67'; Plata 82'; Castillo 88'			Stadium: Estadio Mateo Flores

23 October 2002 Round 1	Comunicaciones (Guatemala)	3–0	(Costa Rica) Santos de Guápiles	Guatemala City, Guatemala
	Valencia 11' 37'; Fonseca 15'			Stadium: Estadio Mateo Flores

25 October 2002 Round 2	Municipal (Guatemala)	1–2	(Costa Rica) Santos de Guápiles	Guatemala City, Guatemala
	Herron 35' (o.g.)		Alfaro 69'; Bennedsen 90+3'	Stadium: Estadio Mateo Flores

25 October 2002 Round 2	Comunicaciones (Guatemala)	6–0	(Nicaragua) San Marcos	Guatemala City, Guatemala
	García 6' 10'; Gareca 45'; Alegría 51'; Rojas 64'; Estrada 87'			Stadium: Estadio Mateo Flores

27 October 2002 Round 3	Municipal (Guatemala)	4–1	(Guatemala) Comunicaciones	Guatemala City, Guatemala
	Acevedo 5' ?'; Plata 42' (pen.); Figueroa 69'		González 60' (pen.)	Stadium: Estadio Mateo Flores

27 October 2002 Round 3	San Marcos (Nicaragua)	0–2	(Costa Rica) Santos de Guápiles	Guatemala City, Guatemala
			Mahoney 31'; Bennedsen 44'	Stadium: Estadio Mateo Flores

=== Group C ===
Pos	Team	Pld	W	D	L	GF	GA	GD	Pts	Qualification
1	Alajuelense	3	2	1	0	7	5	+2	7	Final stage and 2003 CONCACAF Champions' Cup
2	Motagua	3	2	1	0	6	4	+2	7	Final stage and 2003 CONCACAF Champions' Cup
3	Marathón	3	1	0	2	6	4	+2	3	
4	Tauro	3	0	0	3	3	9	−6	0	

30 October 2002 Round 1	Marathón (Honduras)	1–2	(Costa Rica) Alajuelense	Tegucigalpa, Honduras
18:00 (UTC−06:00)	Scott 22'		Bryce 64'; Santamaría 86' (o.g.)	Stadium: Estadio Tiburcio Carías Andino

30 October 2002 Round 1	Motagua (Honduras)	2–1	(Panama) Tauro	Tegucigalpa, Honduras
20:00 (UTC−06:00)	Oseguera 6' 38'		Cubillas 57'	Stadium: Estadio Tiburcio Carías Andino

1 November 2002 Round 2	Alajuelense (Costa Rica)	3–2	(Panama) Tauro	Tegucigalpa, Honduras
18:00 (UTC−06:00)	Bryce 20' 82'; Delgado 47' (pen.)		Parra 22' 42'	Stadium: Estadio Tiburcio Carías Andino

1 November 2002 Round 2	Motagua (Honduras)	2–1	(Honduras) Marathón	Tegucigalpa, Honduras
20:00 (UTC−06:00)	Pacini 38' 67'		Martínez 34'	Stadium: Estadio Tiburcio Carías Andino

3 November 2002 Round 3	Marathón (Honduras)	4–0	(Panama) Tauro	Tegucigalpa, Honduras
14:00 (UTC−06:00)	López 38'; Martínez 79'; Sabillón 84'; Vargas 88'			Stadium: Estadio Tiburcio Carías Andino

3 November 2002 Round 3	Motagua (Honduras)	2–2	(Costa Rica) Alajuelense	Tegucigalpa, Honduras
16:00 (UTC−06:00)	Solís 54'; García 83'		Marín 28'; Alpízar 90+8'	Stadium: Estadio Tiburcio Carías Andino

== Final stage ==
Pos	Team	Pld	W	D	L	GF	GA	GD	Pts
1	Alajuelense (C)	3	3	0	0	13	0	+13	9
2	Árabe Unido	3	2	0	1	3	5	−2	6
3	Motagua	3	1	0	2	4	7	−3	3
4	Comunicaciones	3	0	0	3	1	9	−8	0

(C) Champions

18 December 2002 Round 1	Árabe Unido (Panama)	2–1	(Honduras) Motagua	Alajuela, Costa Rica
	Pérez 32'; Zapata 52'		Nolasco 13'	Stadium: Estadio Alejandro Morera Soto

18 December 2002 Round 1	Alajuelense (Costa Rica)	5–0	(Guatemala) Comunicaciones	Alajuela, Costa Rica
	Scott 7' 16'; Marín 58'; Rocella 80' 81'			Stadium: Estadio Alejandro Morera Soto

20 December 2002 Round 2	Comunicaciones (Guatemala)	1–3	(Honduras) Motagua	Alajuela, Costa Rica
	Estrada 89'		Martínez 21'; Pavón 44'; Solís 90'	Stadium: Estadio Alejandro Morera Soto

20 December 2002 Round 2	Alajuelense (Costa Rica)	4–0	(Panama) Arabe Unido	Alajuela, Costa Rica
	Castro 23' 45'; Alpízar 60'; Cubero 80'			Stadium: Estadio Alejandro Morera Soto

22 December 2002 Round 3	Arabe Unido (Panama)	1–0	(Guatemala) Comunicaciones	Alajuela, Costa Rica
	García 37'			Stadium: Estadio Alejandro Morera Soto

22 December 2002 Round 3	Alajuelense (Costa Rica)	4–0	(Honduras) Motagua	Alajuela, Costa Rica
	Scott 4' 71'; Alpízar 59'; Bryce 69'			Stadium: Estadio Alejandro Morera Soto

2002 Copa Interclubes UNCAF champion

Alajuelense
2nd title
