= Primera División Reserves (El Salvador) =

Copa Sistema Fedecredito
- Founded: 1998
- Country: El Salvador
- Divisions: 1
- Number of clubs: 12
- Level on pyramid: 1
- Relegation to: none
- Current champions: Alianza FC(Reserva) (Primera División Reserves Clausura 2026)
- Most championships: Alianza (Reserva) (14 titles)
- Current: Primera División Reserves Clausura 2026

Primera División Reserves (El Salvador) (officially known as Torneo Reservas), is the reserve team league for the top El Salvador football teams in the Primera Divisió. The league is split into a Clausura and Apertura season.

The league in its current form started in 2009, restarting the top level of reserve-team football which had been inactive since 2003.

Teams are not relegated from the Torneo Reservas League based on their final league position, but on the league position of their respective clubs' senior teams. If a senior team is relegated from the Premier League, then the reserve team is relegated from the Premier Reserve League and replaced by the reserve team of the promoted team.

== Champions ==
The list of all finals

Tournament	Winner	Score	Runner up	Champion Coach
Apertura 1998	Atletico Marte B	1 – 0	Alianza B	
Clausura 1999	Alianza B	1 – 0 aet	ADET B	
Apertura 1999	FAS B	2 – 1	Alianza B	
Clausura 2000	FAS B	3 – 2 aet	Luis Ángel Firpo B	
Apertura 2000	FAS B	2 – 1	ADET B	
Clausura 2001	Municipal Limeño B	1 – 0 / 0 – 4 Aggregate 5 – 0	FAS B	
Apertura 2001	Águila B	2 – 1	Alianza B	
Clausura 2002	Firpo B	3 - 2	Aguila B	
Apertura 2002	FAS B	2 - 1	ADET B	
Clausura 2003	San Salvador B	1(4)-1(1)	CD San Luis B	
Apertura 2003	Alianza B	3-0	Firpo B	
Clausura 2004	11 Lobos B	2-1	Aguila B	
Apertura 2004	Firpo B	0-1	CD Aguila B	
Clausura 2005	Alianza B	3-2	Telecom B	
Apertura 2005	Aguila B	1-0	CD FAS B	
Clausura 2006	Vista Heromea B	2-0	FAS B	
Apertura 2006	Firpo B	2-1	Vista Heromea B	
Clausura 2007	FAS B	3-2	Alianza B	
Apertura 2007	Aguila B	1-0	San Saivador B	
Clausura 2008	Metapan B	1(5)-1(3)	Nejapa B	
Apertura 2008	CD Municipal Limeno	2-1	Firpo B	
Clausura 2009	FAS B	1 – 0	Juventud Independiente B	(El Salvador) Óscar Interiano
Apertura 2009	Alianza B	2 – 0	FAS B	(El Salvador) Oscar Ulloa
Clausura 2010	Atlético Marte B	5 – 5 aet (5–4 pen)	FAS B	(El Salvador) Ernesto Góchez
Apertura 2010	Alianza B	1 – 0	Isidro Metapán B	(El Salvador) William Renderos Iraheta
Clausura 2011	Alianza B	1 – 0	Águila B	(El Salvador) William Renderos Iraheta
Apertura 2011	Atlético Marte B	1 – 0	UES B	(El Salvador) Ernesto Góchez
Clausura 2012	Alianza B	3 – 1	Atlético Marte B	(El Salvador) Miguel Ángel Soriano
Apertura 2012	FAS B	1-0	Águila B	(Uruguay) Pablo Quiñónez
Clausura 2013	Águila B	1-0	Atletico Marte B	(El Salvador) Omar Sevilla
Apertura 2013	Metapan B	2-2 (Pen 4-2)	UES B	(El Salvador) Osvaldo Figueroa
Clausura 2014	Metapan B	1-1 (Pen 5-4)	FAS B	(Argentina) Carlos Martínez
Apertura 2014	Aguila B	3-2	UES B	(El Salvador) Alvaro Misael Alfaro
Clausura 2015	Metapan B	2-0	FAS B	(El Salvador) Jose Osvaldo Figueroa
Apertura 2015	FAS B	2-0	Atletico Marte B	(El Salvador) Erick Dowson Prado
Clausura 2016	Águila B	2 – 1	Alianza B	(El Salvador) Marvin "la Perica" Benítez
Apertura 2016	Águila B	2 – 0	FAS B	(El Salvador) Marvin "la Perica" Benítez
Clausura 2017	Santa Tecla	1-0	Firpo B	(El Salvador) Óscar Navarro
Apertura 2017	Santa Tecla	2-1	Águila B	(El Salvador) Óscar Navarro
Clausura 2018	Metapan B	2-0	Alianza B	(El Salvador) Hector Omar Mejia
Apertura 2018	Alianza B	3-1	Águila B	(El Salvador) Edgar Henriquez
Clausura 2019	Santa Tecla	2-0	Chalatenango	(El Salvador) Rodolfo Gochez
Apertura 2019	Alianza B	2-0	Águila B	(El Salvador) Edgar Henriquez
Clausura 2020 (*Season Cancelled)	None	None	None	(El Salvador) TBD
Apertura 2020	Alianza B	1-0	Municipal Limeño B	(El Salvador) Edgar Henriquez
Clausura 2021	Águila B	3-1	Municipal Limeño B	(El Salvador) Kilmar Martinez
Apertura 2021	Santa Tecla	2-2 (Pen 4-2)	Águila B	(El Salvador) Eduardo Castillo
Clausura 2022	Santa Tecla	5-4	Metapan B	(El Salvador) Francisco Medrano
Apertura 2022	Santa Tecla	2-1	Águila B	(El Salvador) Francisco Medrano
Clausura 2023 (*Season Cancelled)	None	None	None	(El Salvador) TBD
Apertura 2023	Águila B	1-0	FAS B	(El Salvador) Eduardo Castillo
Clausura 2024	Alianza B	5-1	Platense B	(El Salvador) Luis Sosa
Apertura 2024	Alianza B	1-0	Dragon B	(El Salvador) Luis Sosa
Clausura 2025	Alianza B	1-1 (4-3 P)	FAS B	(El Salvador) Luis Sosa
Apertura 2025	Alianza B	6-0	Firpo B	(El Salvador) Luis Sosa
Clausura 2026	Alianza B	2-2 (Pen 3-2)	Metapán B	(El Salvador) Luis Sosa
Apertura 2026			TDB	(El Salvador) TBD
Clausura 2027			TDB	(El Salvador) TBD

=== Performance by Reserves club ===
Club	Winners	Runners-up	Winning seasons
Alianza B	14	5	Clausura 1999, Apertura 2003, Clausura 2005, Apertura 2009, Apertura 2010, Clausura 2011, Clausura 2012, Apertura 2018, Apertura 2019, Apertura 2020, Clausura 2023, Apertura 2024, Clausura 2025, Apertura 2025, Clausura 2026
Águila B	7	5	Apertura 2001, Clausura 2013, Apertura 2014, Clausura 2016, Apertura 2016, Clausura 2021, Apertura 2023
FAS B	6	7	Apertura 1999, Clausura 2000, Apertura 2000, Clausura 2009, Apertura 2012, Apertura 2015
Santa Tecla B	6	0	Clausura 2017, Apertura 2017, Clausura 2019, Apertura 2021, Clausura 2022, Apertura 2022
Isidro Metapan B	4	2	Apertura 2013, Clausura 2014, Clausura 2015, Clausura 2018
Atletico Marte B	3	3	Apertura 1998, Clausura 2010, Apertura 2011
Municipal Limeño B	1	2	Clausura 2001, Apertura 2008
Platense B	0	1	Apertura 2024

== Teams and coaches (2025 Clausura) ==
- Águila reserve side is coached by Joaquin Perez (*).
- Alianza reserve side is coached by Luis Sosa
- Cacahuatique reserve side is coached byRoberto Alexander Melgar (*)
- Dragon reserve side is coached by David Paz (*).
- FAS reserve side is coached by Nelson Ancheta (*).
- Municipal Limeno reserve side is coached by Marvin Rosales (*).
- Platense reserve side is coached by Elmer Gudios (*).
- Firpo reserve side is coached by TBD (*).
- Metapán reserve side is coached by TBD (*).
- Once Deportivo reserve side is coached by TBD (*).

== Top scorers ==
Season	Topscorer	Goals	Club
2009 Clausura	(El Salvador) David Antonio Rugamas	TBD	Juventud Independiente Reservas
2009 Apertura	(El Salvador) Francisco Miguel Murillo	14	Atletico Marte Reservas
2010 Clausura	(El Salvador) José Arsenio Rodríguez	13	Vista Hermosa Reservas
2010 Apertura	(El Salvador) Joel Antonio Monge	11	Vista Hermosa Reservas
2011 Clausura	(El Salvador) Nelson Bonilla	17	Alianza Reservas
2011 Apertura	(El Salvador) Ricardo Guevara	13	Atletico Marte Reservas
2012 Clausura	(El Salvador) José Ángel Peña	12	Atletico Marte Reservas
2012 Apertura	(El Salvador) Kevin Hernández and Edenilson Rigoberto Mezquita	11	Alianza Reservas] & Isidro Metapán Reservas
2013 Clausura	(El Salvador) José Castaneda	13	Isidro Metapán Rservas
2013 Apertura	(El Salvador) Luis Antonio Meléndez	10	UES Reservas
2014 Clausura	(El Salvador) Anthony Alexis Ruíz	12	Aguila Reservas
2014 Apertura	(El Salvador) Miguel Ángel Burgos Martínez	11	UES Rservas
2015 Clausura	(El Salvador) Cristián Girón	11	Aguila Reservas
2015 Apertura	(El Salvador) Brayan Manrique Paz Ayala	15	Aguila Reservas
2016 Clausura	(El Salvador) TBD	00	TBD
2016 Apertura	(El Salvador) TBD	00	TBD
2017 Clausura	(El Salvador) Fernando Tonatiú Escobar	14	Dragon Reservas
2017 Apertura	(El Salvador) Brayan Manrique Paz Ayala	00	Aguila Reservas
2018 Clausura	(El Salvador) Bryan Manrique Paz	00	TBD
2018 Apertura	(El Salvador) Bryan Manrique Paz	18	Aguila Reservas
2019 Clausura	(El Salvador) Christian Guzmán	19	FAS Reservas
2019 Apertura	(El Salvador) TBD	00	TBD
2020 Clausura	None	00	None (*Season Cancelled)
2020 Apertura	(El Salvador) Luis Enrique Vasquez	10	Alianza Reservas
2021 Clausura	(El Salvador) Styven Vásquez	21	Aguila Reservas
2021 Apertura	(El Salvador) Emerson Saúl Mauricio	25	Alianza Reservas
2022 Clausura	(El Salvador) Juan Francisco Sánchez	26	Alianza Reservas
2022 Apertura	(El Salvador) Ricardo Villatoro	10	Aguila Reservas
2023 Clausura	(El Salvador) Rafael Antonio Tejada	23	FAS Reservas
2023 Apertura	(El Salvador) Robin Borjas	20	Aguila Reservas
2024 Clausura	(El Salvador) Robin Borjas	15	Aguila Reservas
2024 Apertura	(El Salvador) Rene Dueñas	32	FAS Reservas
2025 Clausura	(El Salvador) German Palacios	13	Cacahuatique Reservas
2025 Apertura	(El Salvador) Wilber Diaz Minero	16	Isidro Metapan Reservas
2026 Clausura	(El Salvador) Amadeo Martinez	13'	Aguila Reservas
2026 Apertura	(El Salvador) TBD	00	Aguila Reservas
