= Edwin Portillo =

Salvadoran football manager (born 1962)

Personal information
- Full name: Edwin Ernesto Portillo
- Date of birth: 17 November 1962 (age 63)
- Place of birth: Metapán, El Salvador
- Position: Defender

Youth career
- 1976: Atlético Fuentes

Senior career*
Years	Team	Apps	(Gls)
1977–1980	CESSA		
1980–1990	AD Isidro Metapán		

Managerial career
- 1996–1997: CESSA (assistant)
- 1998: Fuerte San Francisco
- 2000–2001: AD Isidro Metapán
- 2002–2003: AD Isidro Metapán
- 2003–2004: Once Lobos
- 2005: Nejapa FC
- 2006–2013: AD Isidro Metapán
- 2014: CD Águila
- 2015: Leones de Occidente
- 2015–2016: Sonsonate FC
- 2016–2017: Leones de Occidente
- 2017–2018: AD Isidro Metapán
- 2018–2019: AD Isidro Metapán
- 2025-: Isidro Metapán
- * Club domestic league appearances and goals

Edwin Ernesto Portillo (born November 17, 1962, in Metapán) is a former Salvadoran professional footballer and current manager.

== Coaching career ==
=== CESSA ===
In 1996, he began his coaching career with CESSA, now called Isidro Metapán.

=== Fuerte San Francisco ===
He signed as new coach of Fuerte San Francisco in 1998.

=== Isidro Metapán ===
In 2000, Portillo signed as new coach of Isidro Metapán, replacing Nelson Mauricio Ancheta. Portillo led them to get promoted to the Primera División in 2001. In October 2001, Portillo was replaced by José Calazán.

=== Second return to Isidro Metapán ===
In October 2002, Portillo signed again as coach of Isidro Metapán, replacing Roberto Fabrizio. In June 2003, Portillo was replaced by Raúl Héctor Cocherari.

=== Once Lobos ===
In 2003, Portillo signed as coach of Once Lobos, replacing Jorge Rivas. In 2004, Portillo was replaced by Carlos Recinos.

=== Third return to Isidro Metapán ===
However, most of his success happened when he signed again as coach of Isidro Metapán in October 2006, replacing Rubén Alonso. He led the club to winning the Clausura 2007, Apertura 2008, Clausura 2009, Clausura 2010, Apertura 2010, Apertura 2011 and Apertura 2012. Also, he lost the Clausura 2012 final against Águila (1–2 defeat).

However, in March 2013, Portillo was replaced by Jorge Rodríguez (footballer, born 1971).

=== Águila ===
In February 2014, Portillo signed as new coach of Águila, replacing Raúl Martínez Sambulá for the rest of the Clausura 2014. In March 2014, Portillo was replaced by Jairo Ríos Rendón.

=== Leones de Occidente ===
In 2015, Portillo signed as new coach of Leones de Occidente.

=== Sonsonate ===
In October 2015, Portillo signed as new coach of Sonsonate for the rest of the Apertura 2015, replacing Héctor Jara. In April 2016, Portillo was replaced by William Renderos Iraheta.

=== Return to Leones de Occidente ===
In October 2016, Portillo signed again as coach of Leones de Occidente.

=== Fourth return to Isidro Metapán ===
Portillo signed again as coach of Isidro Metapán for the Clausura 2017, replacing Álvaro Misael Alfaro. Portillo led them to the semi-finals of that tournament, but they were defeated by Alianza 0–2 on aggregate.

In March 2018, Portillo was replaced by Agustín Castillo after a 0–3 defeat against Santa Tecla FC.

=== Fifth return to Isidro Metapán ===
In December 2018, it was announced that Agustín Castillo would be replaced by Portillo as new coach of Isidro Metapán for the Clausura 2019.

== Honours ==
=== Manager ===
==== Club ====
A.D. Isidro Metapán

- Primera División
  - Champion: Clausura 2007, Apertura 2008, Clausura 2009, Clausura 2010, Apertura 2010, Apertura 2011, Apertura 2012
  - Runners-up: Clausura 2012

== Achievements ==
20 October 2011. Edwin Portillo's Isidro Metapán became the first Salvadoran team to qualify for the quarter-finals (last eight) in the CONCACAF Champions League new format. He currently holds the record for the most Salvadoran club titles as a manager (7 club tournaments).
