= Mauricio Quintanilla (footballer, born 1981) =

Salvadoran footballer

Personal information
- Full name: Mauricio Arnoldo Quintanilla Flores
- Date of birth: October 31, 1981 (age 45)
- Place of birth: Ilopango, El Salvador
- Height: 1.73 m (5 ft 8 in)
- Position: Defender

Youth career
- 1991–1998: ADET (B)

Senior career*
Years	Team	Apps	(Gls)
1999–2001	ADET		
2001–2006	Luis Ángel Firpo		
2007	Nejapa		
2007–2008	Luis Ángel Firpo		
2009–2012	Alianza		
2012–2014	Luis Ángel Firpo		
2015–2016	Sonsonate		
2016–2017	Municipal Limeño	28	(0)

International career
2001–2004	El Salvador	5	(0)
- * Club domestic league appearances and goals

Mauricio Arnoldo Quintanilla Flores (born October 31, 1981) is a Salvadoran former professional footballer who played as a defender.

== Club career ==
Quintanilla was born in Ilopango, El Salvador.

=== ADET ===
Quintanilla signed with ADET in 1999.

=== Luis Ángel Firpo ===
Quintanilla signed with Luis Ángel Firpo in 2001.

=== Nejapa FC ===
Quintanilla signed with Nejapa FC in 2007.

=== Second to Luis Ángel Firpo ===
After left Nejapa FC, Quintanilla signed again with Luis Ángel Firpo. He played with the team of Usulután at the 2008–09 CONCACAF Champions League Group Stage.

=== Alianza FC ===
Quintanilla signed with Alianza FC in 2009.

=== Municipal Limeño ===
In 2016, Quintanilla signed with Municipal Limeño.

== International career ==
Quintanilla made his debut for El Salvador in a March 2001 friendly match against Guatemala and has earned a total of 5 caps, scoring no goals.

All of these games were friendlies, though he was a non-playing squad member at the 2003 CONCACAF Gold Cup.

His final international game was an August 2004 friendly match, also against Guatemala.

== Honours ==
ADET

- Salvadoran Primera División runner-up: Clausura 2000

Luis Ángel Firpo

- Salvadoran Primera División: Apertura 2007, Clausura 2008, Clausura 2013; runner-up Apertura 2001, Clausura 2003, Clausura 2005, Clausura 2007

Alianza FC

- Salvadoran Primera División: Clausura 2011; runner-up Apertura 2010
