= A.D. Leones de Metapan =

Salvadoran football club

A.D. Leones de Occidente
- Full name: Asociacion Deportiva Metapaneca Leones de Occidente
- Founded: 2015
- Chairman: Maximiliano Martinez
- Manager: Edwin Portillo
- League: Liga de Plata Salvadoreña
- Apertura 2015: Apertura 2015 Grupo "A"
Home colours

Asociacion Deportiva Metapaneca Leones de Occidente are a Salvadoran professional football club based in Metapan, El Salvador.

== History ==
In 2015 the club purchased the spot of C.D. Guadulapano spot to be able to compete in the newly increased second division.

== Personnel ==
=== Current technical staff ===
Head coach	Edwin Portillo
Assistant coach	Luis Galdamez
Physical

== List of coaches ==
- Edwin Portillo (May 2015–)
