= Martín Uranga =

Argentine footballer

Martín Ezequiel Uranga (born 5 February 1978) is an Argentine former professional footballer who played as a forward.

== Career ==
- Argentino de Rosario 1998–1999
- Newell's Old Boys 2000–2001
- Central Córdoba de Rosario 2001–2002
- Palestino 2002–2003
- Arcense 2003
- Isidro Metapán 2004
- Atlético Tucumán 2004–2005
- Platense 2005–2006
- C.A.I. 2006
- Guillermo Brown 2007–2008
- Juventud Unida Universitario 2008
- Estudiantes de Río Cuarto 2009
- Racing de Olavarría 2010
- Atlético Juventud Alianza 2010
