= Edward Cocherari =

Guatemalan international footballer (born 1980)

Eduardo Cocherari
Personal information
- Full name: Eduardo Andre Cocherari Cohen
- Date of birth: January 23, 1980 (age 46)
- Place of birth: San Salvador, El Salvador
- Height: 1.75 m (5 ft 9 in)
- Position: Midfielder

Senior career*
Years	Team	Apps	(Gls)
1998–2000	ADET		
2000–2001	Alianza		
2002	Comunicaciones		
2003	San Salvador F.C.		
2003–2004	Aurora	25	(1)
2004–2007	Petapa		

International career^{‡}
2001	Guatemala	6	(0)
- * Club domestic league appearances and goals as of 31 January 2010 ‡ National team caps and goals as of 31 January 2010

Eduardo Andre Cocherari Cohen (born January 23, 1980) is a Guatemalan international footballer who most recently played for Deportivo Petapa.

== Early life ==
Cocherari was born in San Salvador, El Salvador, the son of the Argentine former footballer Raúl Héctor Cocherari, who was playing for Alianza FC as an expatriate. Therefore, he held dual Salvadoran-Argentine nationality. During his childhood, he lived in Guatemala, then becoming a citizen of that country. Cocherari came back to El Salvador in the 90s when his father was signed as coach of Cojutepeque FC.

== Club career ==
El Salvador-born Cocherari played for ADET, San Salvador F.C. and Alianza F.C. in El Salvador and Aurora F.C. in Guatemala before joining Petapa in 2004. In 2005, he scored the second goal that definitely lifted Petapa back into the Guatemalan Premier League

== International career ==
Cocherari made his debut for Guatemala in a May 2001 UNCAF Nations Cup match against Costa Rica and has, as of January 2010, earned a total of 6 caps, scoring no goals. He has collected all of his caps at that UNCAF Cup tournament.

== Honours ==
- Primera División de Fútbol Profesional: 1

2003

== Personal life ==
Cocherari's mother, Lucy Cohen, is also from Argentina. Despite her Jewish surname, she is a Christian.
