= Fabinho Azevedo =

Association football player (1977–2018)

Personal information
- Full name: Fábio Pereira de Azevedo
- Date of birth: 1 January 1977
- Place of birth: Salvador, Bahia, Brazil
- Date of death: 2 February 2018 (aged 41)
- Place of death: Maravilha, Santa Catarina, Brazil
- Height: 1.73 m (5 ft 8 in)
- Position: Striker

Senior career*
Years	Team	Apps	(Gls)
2002	Tubarão		
2003–2004	Chapecoense		
2004–2006	Águila		
2005	→ San Salvador FC (loan)		
2006–2007	Platense Municipal		
2007	Isidro Metapán		
2007–2008	Platense Municipal		
2009–2010	Chapecoense		
2010	Bahia de Feira		
2011	Concórdia		

International career
2003	Togo	1	(0)

Managerial career
- Club Recreativo de Maravilla (youth)
- * Club domestic league appearances and goals

Fábio Pereira de Azevedo (1 January 1977 – 2 February 2018), known as Fabinho Baiano or simply Fabinho, was a footballer who played as a striker. Born and raised in Brazil, he was naturalized by Togo and played for that national team.

During his four years in the top flight Primera División de El Salvador side Isidro Metapán, Fabinho made the title goal for at Clausura 2007 during extra time against Luis Ángel Firpo.

Fabinho died in the early hours of 2 February 2018 in a car crash on the BR-282 highway.

== Biography ==
Fabinho was born in Salvador, a city on the northeast coast of Brazil and the capital of the Northeastern Brazilian state of Bahia.

== International career ==
Fabinho played for Togo on 5 July 2003 in a 2004 African Cup of Nations Qualifying match against Mauritania. He was also Togolese international in two friendly matches, one against the Ghanaian club Asante Kotoko in a friendly match on 29 June 2003 in Stade de Kégué, Lomé.
