= Estadio Hanz Usko =

Estadio Hans Usko
- Full name: Estadio Hans Usko
- Location: Guazapa, San Salvador, El Salvador
- Capacity: 3,000
- Surface: Grass

Tenants
- ADET (-2003); Escuela de Fútbol de Guazapa

Estadio Hans Usko is a multi-use stadium in Guazapa, El Salvador. It is currently used mostly for football matches and is the home stadium of AD El Tránsito ADET. The stadium holds 3,000 spectators. The stadium was named in tribute to Hans Gunter Usko the former head of Bayer, who was a major sponsor to ADET, who was killed in a robbery gone wrong .
