= Selvin Zepeda =

Salvadoran footballer (born 1981)

Personal information
- Full name: Selvin Bonifacio Zepeda Morales
- Date of birth: 13 July 1981 (age 45)
- Place of birth: San Sebastián, El Salvador
- Height: 1.79 m (5 ft 10 in)
- Position: Defender

Senior career*
Years	Team	Apps	(Gls)
1998–2000	Santa Clara		
2000–2001	ADET		
2002–2008	San Salvador F.C.	153	(4)
2008	FAS	8	(0)
2009–2010	Nejapa	36	(1)
2010	Alacranes Del Norte		

International career^{‡}
1997	El Salvador U20		
2008	El Salvador	1	(0)
- * Club domestic league appearances and goals as of January 2007 ‡ National team caps and goals as of 10:06, 30 July 2009 (UTC)

Selvin Bonifacio Zepeda Morales (born 13 July 1981 in San Sebastián) is a Salvadoran football player who represented El Salvador at international level.

== Club career ==
Zepeda started his career at Santa Clara in 1998 before joining ADET in 2000. In 2002, he moved to newly formed San Salvador F.C. and stayed with them until they disbanded in 2008. After a season at FAS he signed for Nejapa, later renamed Alacranes Del Norte.

== International career ==
Zepeda made his debut for El Salvador in a January 2008 friendly match against Haiti but has not featured in the national side since.
