= Jaime Gómez (Salvadoran footballer) =

Salvadoran footballer (born 1980)

Jaime Gomez
Personal information
- Full name: Jaime Mauricio Gómez Sandoval
- Date of birth: May 10, 1980 (age 46)
- Place of birth: Santa Ana, El Salvador
- Height: 1.71 m (5 ft 7 in)
- Position: Midfielder

Team information
- Current team: Titán

Senior career*
Years	Team	Apps	(Gls)
2000–2006	FAS		
2006–2007	Once Municipal		
2007–2008	Isidro Metapán		
2008–2010	Juventud Independiente		
2010–present	Titán		

International career^{‡}
2001	El Salvador	1	(0)
- * Club domestic league appearances and goals ‡ National team caps and goals as of 10 May 2011

Jaime Mauricio Gómez Sandoval (born May 10, 1980) is a Salvadoran footballer who plays for Salvadoran second division side Titán.

== Club career ==
Gómez made his professional debut with local club FAS in April 2000 against Águila after spending a year at their reserves team. He would stay with FAS for seven years, winning 5 league titles in the process. In 2006, he moved to Once Municipal, only to leave them the next year for Isidro Metapán. He joined Juventud Independiente in 2008, but won the second division title with Titán when beating Juventud in December 2010.

== International career ==
Gómez made his debut for El Salvador in a December 2001 friendly match against Haiti which was staged in Miami. The game proved to be his sole international appearance.
