= Gareca =

Gareca is a surname. Notable people with the surname include:

- Leandro Gareca (born 1991), Bolivian footballer
- Ricardo Gareca (born 1958), Argentine football manager
