= Rolando Corella =

Costa Rican footballer (born 1972)

Personal information
- Full name: Rolando Corella Agüero
- Date of birth: July 26, 1972 (age 54)
- Place of birth: Atenas, Costa Rica
- Height: 1.74 m (5 ft 9 in)
- Position: Striker

Team information
- Current team: Colegio de Abogados

Senior career*
Years	Team	Apps	(Gls)
1991–1998	Herediano		
1998–1999	Santa Bárbara		
1999–2001	San Carlos		
2001	Turrialba		
2002–2003	Carmelita		
2002	FAS		
2003	Belén		
2003–2004	Municipal Grecia		
2004–2005	Santos de Guápiles		
2005–2006	Carmelita		

International career
1989	Costa Rica U-17		
- * Club domestic league appearances and goals

Rolando Corella Agüero (born June 26, 1972) is a retired Costa Rican footballer.

== Club career ==
Corella scored a goal in the 1992/93 championship playoff against Cartaginés, which won Herediano the league title. He left Herediano in 1998 for Santa Bárbara and later had a spell abroad with Salvadoran outfit FAS, scoring 3 goals in the 17–0 rout of Nicaraguans Jalapa in the 2002 Copa Interclubes UNCAF.

In January 2004 he left Municipal Grecia for Santos de Guápiles.
