= Héctor Canjura =

Salvadoran footballer (born 1976)

Personal information
- Full name: Héctor Aarón Canjura Astorga
- Date of birth: 15 July 1976 (age 50)
- Place of birth: San Salvador, El Salvador
- Height: 1.74 m (5 ft 8 1/2 in)
- Position: Midfielder

Youth career
- 1986–1994: Los Pericos

Senior career*
| Years | Team | Apps | (Gls) |
| 1996–1998 | ADET | | |
| 1999–2006 | Luis Ángel Firpo | | |
| 2007–2009 | Nejapa | 76 | (6) |

International career^{‡}
| 2000–2002 | El Salvador | 12 | (1) |
- * Club domestic league appearances and goals as of 29 January 2011 ‡ National team caps and goals as of 29 January 2011

Héctor Aarón Canjura Astorga (born 15 July 1976) is a retired football player from El Salvador.

== Club career ==
Canjura started his professional career at ADET, but then joined Luis Ángel Firpo for a long spell. He ended his career at Nejapa in December 2009 to become an administrative manager at the club which was renamed Alacranes Del Norte.

== International career ==
Canjura made his debut for El Salvador in a July 2000 FIFA World Cup qualification match against Honduras and has earned a total of 12 caps, scoring 1 goal. He has represented his country in 3 FIFA World Cup qualification matches and played at the 2001 UNCAF Nations Cup and at the 2002 CONCACAF Gold Cup.

His final international game was a January 2002 CONCACAF Gold Cup match against Mexico.

=== International goals ===
Scores and results list El Salvador's goal tally first.

| # | Date | Venue | Opponent | Score | Result | Competition |
|---|---|---|---|---|---|---|
| 1 | 25 May 2001 | Estadio Nacional, Tegucigalpa, Honduras | Panama | 2–0 | 2–1 | UNCAF Nations Cup |

== Honours ==
- Primera División de Fútbol de El Salvador: 2

1999 Clausura, 2000 Clausura
