= Moresche (footballer, born 1971) =

Brazilian footballer

Personal information
- Full name: Alessandro Moresche Rodríguez
- Date of birth: June 6, 1971 (age 55)
- Place of birth: Rio de Janeiro, Brazil
- Position: Striker

Senior career*
Years	Team	Apps	(Gls)
1990–1992	Fluminense		
1992–1993	Zamalek		
1993–1994	Al-Shabab		
1994–1995	Deportivo Táchira		
1995–1998	Inmortal D.C.		
1998–2000	Universidad		
2001	C.D. FAS		
2001–2003	Isidro Metapán		
2004	Once Lobos		
- * Club domestic league appearances and goals

Alessandro Moresche Rodríguez, also known as "Moresche" (born June 6, 1971) is a retired Brazilian footballer who played for Fluminense in the Copa do Brasil. Rodríguez has gone on to play for a number of clubs across around the world making him a journey man and making him a key to most of the clubs' success.
