= Raúl Cocherari =

Argentine footballer and manager

Personal information
- Full name: Raúl Héctor Cocherari
- Date of birth: 31 March 1949 (age 77)
- Place of birth: Avellaneda, Buenos Aires, Argentina
- Position: Midfielder

Senior career*
Years	Team	Apps	(Gls)
1967	Racing Club		
1971	UCA		
1971	Arsenal de Sarandí		
1972	Juventud Olímpica		
1972–1973	Comunicaciones		
1973–1974	Oriental de Lisboa	9	(0)
1974	Defensor Lima		
1975	Arles		
1976	Once Municipal		
1977	Alianza		
1978	Unión de Curtidores	12	(0)
1978	Boulogne		
1980	Alianza		
1979–1980	Comunicaciones		
1982	Olimpia		
1982	Galcasa		
1982	Sacachispas		
1982	UES		
- CABJ escuelas

Managerial career
- 1991: Comunicaciones
- 1994–1995: Cojutepeque
- Apaneca
- 2000: Alianza (Assistant)
- 2001: San Luis
- 2003: Isidro Metapán
- 2003: Chalatenango
- 2004: Municipal Limeño
- 2005: El Salvador U-17
- 2006: Vendaval
- Municipal
- 2010–2011: Atlético Marte (Assistant)
- 2012: Juventud Escuintleca
- * Club domestic league appearances and goals as of December 18, 2022

Raúl Héctor Cocherari (born 1949) is a former Argentine football player and manager. Throughout his football career, he played for various teams from Guatemala, Honduras, Peru, Argentina, El Salvador, and Europe.

Raúl Héctor Cocherari has had spells as manager of clubs in El Salvador and Guatemala. His Salvadoran-born son Eduardo Cocherari played for Guatemala at youth and senior levels.

== Achievements ==
Year	Finish	Team	Tournament	Role	Notes
1967	Champion	Racing Club	Copa Libertadores	Player	
1967	Champion	Racing Club	Intercontinental Cup	Player	
1972	Champion	C.S.D. Comunicaciones	1st Division Guatemala	Player	
1980	Champion	C.S.D. Comunicaciones	1st Division Guatemala	Player	
1982	Champion	C.D. Olimpia	1st Division Honduras	Player	
1991	Runner up	C.S.D. Comunicaciones	CONCACAF Cup Winners Cup	Coach	
