= Diego Oyarbide =

Argentine footballer and manager

Personal information
- Full name: Diego Ladislao Oyarbide
- Date of birth: 10 January 1972 (age 54)
- Place of birth: Rosario, Argentina
- Position: Forward

Diego Ladislao Oyarbide (born 10 January 1972) is an Argentine football manager and former player. He played as a forward for clubs of Argentina, Chile, Colombia, Venezuela and El Salvador.

== Teams as footballer ==
- Nueva Chicago 1993
- Regional Atacama 1994
- Newell's Old Boys 1994–1995
- Godoy Cruz 1995–1996
- Argentino (R) 1996–1997
- Huracán de Corrientes 1997–1998
- Atlanta 1998–1999
- Atlético Bucaramanga 1999
- Huracán de San Rafael 2000–2001
- Trujillanos FC 2001
- Águila 2002
- Isidro Metapán 2002
- Sportivo Las Parejas 2003–2007

== Teams as manager ==
- Sportivo Las Parejas 2007–2008
- Studebaker (Villa Cañas) 2011–2015
- Sportivo Las Parejas 2015–2017
- Unión Futbol Club 2017
- (Argentina) Argentino de Rosario (2021)
