= Rubén Alonso =

Uruguayan footballer and manager (born 1962)

Rubén Alonso Alves
Personal information
- Full name: Rubén Rudesindo Alonso Alves
- Date of birth: August 3, 1956 (age 70)
- Place of birth: Montevideo, Uruguay
- Position: Forward

Team information
- Current team: TBD (manager)

Senior career*
Years	Team	Apps	(Gls)
- Cerro
1980	Rentistas		
1981-1984	Finanzas Industriales Amatitlán		
1985–1987	Alianza		
1988	Real España		(8)
1989	Aurora		
1989	Finanzas Industriales		
1991–1992	Fuerte San Francisco		(31)
1993	Apaneca		
1994	Sonsonate FC		
1995–1997	ADET		
1995, 1998–1999	Municipal Limeño		

Managerial career
- 1997: CD Árabe Marte
- 1997–1998: Sonsonate
- 1998: Alianza
- 1999–2000: Municipal Limeño
- 2000–2001: Jocoro
- 2002–2003: San Salvador FC
- 2003: Mar y Plata
- 2003: San Salvador FC
- 2004: Municipal San Martín
- 2004–2005: Chalatenango
- 2005–2006: Isidro Metapán
- 2006: Independiente
- 2006–2007: Fuerte Aguilares
- 2007–2008: Once Lobos
- 2008: San Salvador FC
- 2009: Acajutla FC
- 2009–2010: Águila
- 2010: UES
- 2010–2011: Santa Tecla FC
- 2011–2012: Juventud Retalteca
- 2012–2014: Sonsonate FC
- 2014: Audaz
- 2015–2016: Alianza
- 2016: Marte Soyapango
- 2016: Chalatenango
- 2016–2017: Independiente
- 2017–2018: Sonsonate FC
- 2018: Jocoro
- 2018–2019: Brujos de Izalco
- 2023-2024: Cruzeiro
- 2024-2025: Fuerte San Francisco
- * Club domestic league appearances and goals

Rubén Rudesindo Alonso Alves (born 1 September 1962) is a former Uruguayan professional football player and last managed Fuerte San Francisco.

== Playing career ==
He won titles with Alianza and Real España, and was the top goalscorer in the First Division in El Salvador and Honduras, for Fuerte San Francisco and Real España in the 1991–1992 season, and 1988–89 season respectively.

Alonso ended up scoring 138 goals in the El Salvador first division.

== Coaching career ==
His first coaching tenure was with Árabe Marte and Sonsonate in the Second Division, after a successful spell he became coach of his former club Alianza and helped them win the 1998 Apertura title.

After leaving Alianza, he spent time coaching clubs in the Second Division almost promoting three clubs Municipal Limeño, Jocoro F.C. and Mar y Plata FC to the First Division.

He eventually became coach of the newly formed San Salvador, this would be their greatest coaching achievement to date, since it helped the club not only win the club's only title in its history, it also saved them from relegation three times.

After being released from his contract from San Salvador, he first took the reins of First Division side Isidro Metapán and Independiente Nacional 1906, then he managed Second Division sides Fuerte Aguilares and Once Lobos, but he only managed moderate success with these sides.

He rejoined the San Salvador to try to save them from relegation once again, despite saving them from direct relegation, he couldn't save them from a relegation play-off lost to Juventud Independiente.

After the club folded due to financial difficulty, he signed to coach Alba Acajutla, a club based in Sonsonate, and the club his son plays for.

After a string of defeats he was sacked from the club, however he was signed to coach Águila for the rest of the 2010 Clausura season, but after taking them to the grand final, Águila were defeated by Isidro Metapán and his contract was not extended.

He was presented as the new coach for UES for the 2010 Apertura season.

From 2017 is the manager of Sonsonate, fighting to get out the team from relegation.

== Honours ==
=== Playing ===
==== Club ====
Alianza F.C.

- Primera División
  - Champion: 1986–1987

Real C.D. España

- Liga Nacional
  - Champion: 1988–1989

==== Individual ====
- Alianza F.C. Golden Boot: 1987-1988 (15 goals)
- Golden Boot:

=== Manager ===
==== Club ====
Alianza F.C.

- Primera División
  - Champion: Apertura 1998, Apertura 2015

San Salvador F.C.

- Primera División
  - Champion: Clausura 2003
  - Runners-up: Apertura 2002

A.D. Isidro Metapán

- Primera División
  - Runners-up: Apertura 2005

C.D. Águila

- Primera División
  - Runners-up: Clausura 2010

Jocoro F.C.

- Segunda División
  - Champion: Clausura 2017
