= Roberto Fabrizio =

Argentine footballer and manager

Personal information
- Date of birth: 19 July 1957 (age 69)
- Place of birth: Rosario, Argentina

Managerial career
- Years: Team
- 1993–1994: Argentinos Juniors
- 1994–1996: Newell's Old Boys
- 1996–1998: Almirante Brown
- 1998–2000: Atlético Tucumán
- 2001–2002: A.D. Isidro Metapán

Roberto Fabrizio (born 19 July 1957) is an Argentine former football player and manager. He coached his club football in Argentina, El Salvador.
