= Juan Carlos Panameño =

Salvadoran footballer (born 1977)

Personal information
- Full name: Juan Carlos Panameño Sifón
- Date of birth: April 12, 1977 (age 49)
- Place of birth: San Salvador, El Salvador
- Height: 1.74 m (5 ft 8 1/2 in)
- Position: Midfielder

Youth career
- 1991–1997: ADET

Senior career*
Years	Team	Apps	(Gls)
1998–2000	ADET		
2000	Luis Ángel Firpo		
2001–2005	FAS		
2006–2007	Chalatenango		
2007–2008	Isidro Metapán		
2008–2009	Marte Soyapango		
2009	Santa Tecla		
2010	Nejapa/Alacranes Del Norte		

International career^{‡}
2000	El Salvador	2	(0)
- * Club domestic league appearances and goals ‡ National team caps and goals as of 28 August 2011

Juan Carlos Panameño Sifón (born April 12, 1977 in San Salvador, El Salvador) is a Salvadoran footballer

== Club career ==
Nicknamed La Brujita (the little witch), Panameño came through the youth ranks at ADET and made his senior debut in 1998. In 2000, he had a short spell at Luis Ángel Firpo and when ADET sold him to Alianza he did not want to join them but instead trained with FAS, thus possibly disabling himself to play at the start of the 2001 Apertura. He finally joined FAS for whom he made his debut in a September 2001 4-0 win over Dragón. He scored 2 goals on his debut and went on to win 5 league titles with FAS, however he left the club at the end of 2005 due to limited playing opportunities. He joined Chalatenango, then Isidro Metapán before he ended up playing in the Salvadoran second division with Marte Soyapango (with whom he reached the Final of the second division B in 2009), Santa Tecla and Nejapa/Alacranes Del Norte.

== International career ==
Panameño made his debut for El Salvador in a February 2000 friendly match against Honduras, coming on as a second half substitute for William Renderos, and has earned a total of just 2 caps, scoring no goals. His other and final international game was a July 2000 friendly match against Guatemala.
