= Misael Alfaro =

Salvadoran footballer (born 1971)

Personal information
- Full name: Álvaro Misael Alfaro Sánchez
- Date of birth: January 6, 1971 (age 55)
- Place of birth: Nueva San Salvador, El Salvador
- Height: 1.84 m (6 ft 0 in)
- Position: Goalkeeper

Youth career
- 1987: Destroyer La Libertad

Senior career*
Years	Team	Apps	(Gls)
1988–1994	Alianza		
1994–2001	Luis Ángel Firpo		
2002–2003	San Salvador		
2004	Águila		
2004–2005	Alianza		
2006–2008	Isidro Metapán		
2008	Atlético Balboa		
2009	Nejapa		
2009–2010	Isidro Metapán		

International career
1991–2005	El Salvador	42	(1)

Managerial career
- 2009–2010: Isidro Metapán (goalkeeper coach)
- 2010–2013: Águila (goalkeeper coach)
- 2013: Alianza (goalkeeper coach)
- 2013–2014: Águila (goalkeeper coach)
- 2014: Águila (reserves)
- 2014: Águila (assistant)
- 2015: Luis Ángel Firpo (goalkeeper coach)
- 2015–2016: Luis Ángel Firpo
- 2016: Juventud Independiente
- 2016–2017: Chalatenango (goalkeeper coach)
- 2017: Isidro Metapán (interim)
- 2017–2018: Audaz
- 2018–2019: Chalatenango
- 2019–2020: Municipal Limeño
- 2022–2023: Atletico Balboa
- 2024–: El Salvador Under 17 (Goalkeeper coach)
- * Club domestic league appearances and goals

Álvaro Misael Alfaro Sánchez (born January 6, 1971) is a former Salvadoran professional goalkeeper and currently manager.

He ended his career at Isidro Metapán of the Salvadoran Primera División in 2010.

== Club career ==
=== Destroyer ===
Misael Alfaro started his career at juvenile team of Destroyer La Libertad in 1987.

=== Alianza ===
He went to Alianza in 1988, then joined Luis Ángel Firpo in 1994 and was soon promoted to starting goalie.

=== Luis Ángel Firpo ===
Alfaro had a very successful time with Luis Ángel Firpo, winning several national league titles (1997–98, Clausura 1999, and Clausura 2000), but also losing the final of the Apertura 2001.

=== San Salvador FC ===
He left Luis Ángel Firpo for San Salvador FC in 2002, losing the final of the Apertura 2002 but winning the Clausura 2003.

=== Águila ===
Alfaro had spells at Águila (2004) and Alianza (2004–2005) before joining Isidro Metapán for a first spell in 2006, to win another league title at the Clausura 2007.

=== Return to Isidro Metapán ===
He rejoined Isidro Metapán in 2009, after two short-lived spells at Atlético Balboa (2008) and Nejapa (2009), to win another league title in the Clausura 2010 with the Santa Ana team.

=== Goalkeeping scoring record ===
Alfaro was ranked number 8 in the World's Most Successful Goalscoring Goalkeepers of All Time, chart with 31 goals, with 11 of those coming from a penalty kick.

=== Retirement ===
He announced his retirement from football in August 2010, after suffering a serious neck injury during a game against Atlético Marte. The incident brought a close to his playing career.

== Coaching career ==
After his retirement from football, Misael Alfaro decided to try his luck in the technical staff of different national teams as goalkeeper coach.

=== Goalkeeper coach of Alianza ===
Before starting the Apertura 2013 tournament, Alfaro signed as a goalkeeper coach of Alianza, team in which he was only one year working.

=== Goalkeeper coach of Águila ===
At the end of his period in Alianza, Alfaro signed as new goalkeeper coach of Águila (2013–2014), time in which he also received his credentials of 'Clase B' coach.

=== Águila's reserve team ===
In 2014 Alfaro was appointed as new coach of the reserve team of Águila, making the youth team champion of the Apertura tournament of reserves teams.

=== Luis Ángel Firpo ===
In 2015 Alfaro was announced as new goalkeeper coach of Luis Ángel Firpo, team that at that time played in the Segunda División. After the dismissal of Nelson Ancheta of Luis Ángel Firpo, Alfaro was appointed as the team's new coach, Alfaro's first experience as a head coach in a professional team.

=== Juventud Independiente ===
In 2016 Juventud Independiente bought the category to Luis Ángel Firpo, being administered by the team of Opico. Alfaro retained his charge as coach, but after severe arrears in salary payments he resigned his charge in the team.

=== Isidro Metapán ===
In 2017, after the dismissal of Roberto Gamarra as coach of Isidro Metapán, Alfaro was appointed as interim coach. Previously Alfaro worked in the technical staff of Isidro Metapán as goalkeeper coach between 2009 and 2010.

=== Audaz ===
In the Clausura 2018 Alvaro was appointed as new coach of Audaz at the time a newly promoted team.

=== Chalatenango ===
As October 2018, Alfaro was appointed as new coach of Chalatenango for the Apertura 2018 tournament. With Chalatenango Alfaro it was also goalkeeper coach in 2016. On November 25, Alfaro got to classify the team to play the quarter-finals of the Apertura 2018. In the second leg of the quarter-finals of the Apertura 2018, Chalatenango was defeated by Alianza 0–7 at the Estadio Cuscatlán.

== International career ==
Alfaro made his debut for El Salvador in an April 1991 UNCAF Nations Cup qualification match against Nicaragua, and has earned a total of 42 caps, scoring no goals.

He has represented his country in 12 FIFA World Cup qualification matches in two World Cup campaigns. However, both were unsuccessful, with the national team failing to progress to the final group stages.

Also he played at several UNCAF Cups as well as at the 1998 CONCACAF Gold Cup.

Álvaro Misael Alfaro announced his retirement from the international games in 2006, after learning of problems with his heart. His final international game was a February 2005 UNCAF Nations Cup match against Costa Rica.

== Honours ==
=== Club ===
Alianza

- Primera División
  - Champion: 1993–1994

Luis Ángel Firpo

- Primera División
  - Champion: 1997–1998, Clausura 1999, Clausura 2000
  - Runners-up: Apertura 1998, Apertura 2001

San Salvador FC

- Primera División
  - Champion: Clausura 2003
  - Runners-up: Apertura 2002

Isidro Metapán

- Primera División
  - Champion: Clausura 2007, Clausura 2010
  - Runners-up:
