= Metapán =

City and municipality in El Salvador

- District
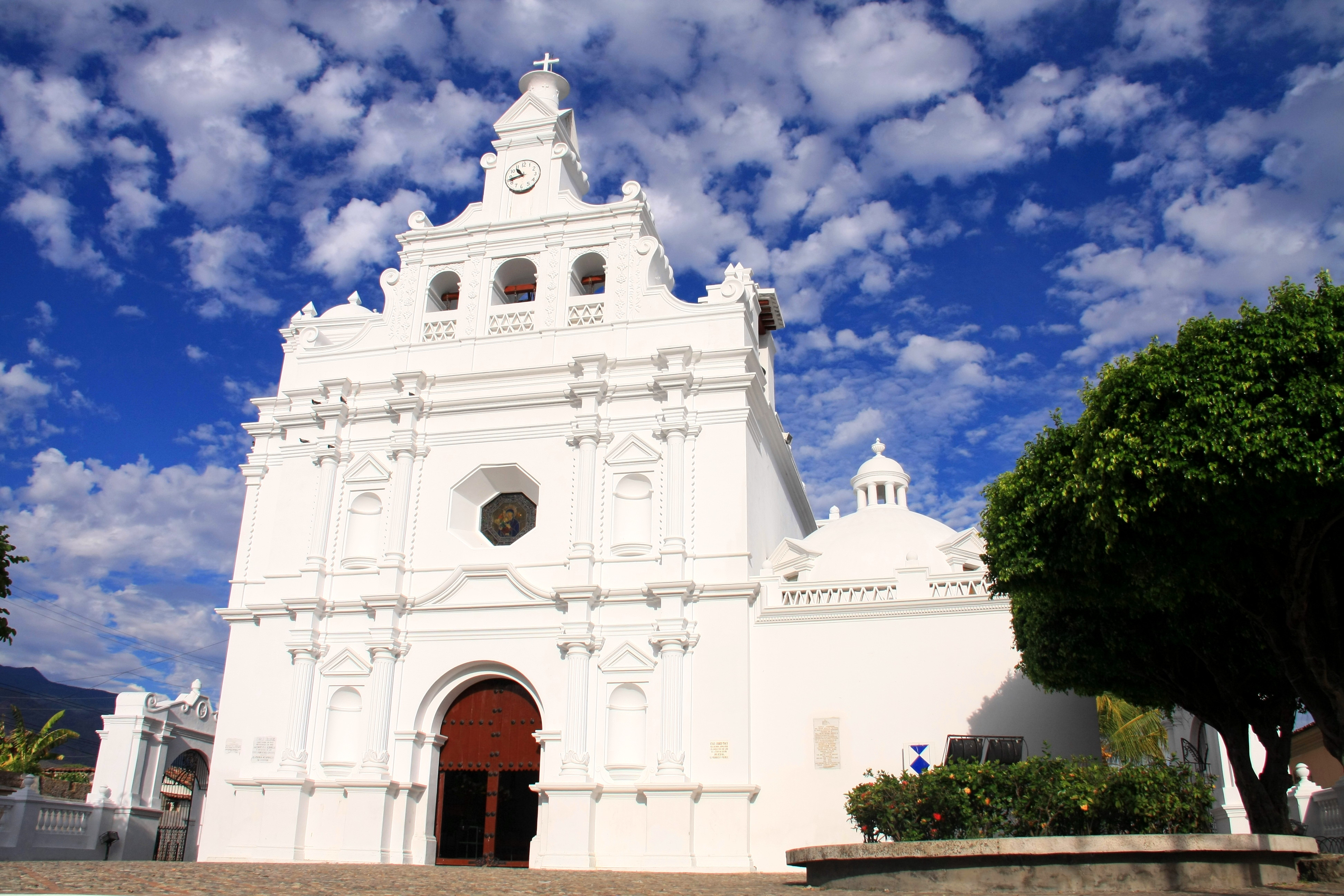
- Iglesia de San Pedro

- Location in El Salvador
- Coordinates: 14°19′53″N 89°26′34″W
- Country: El Salvador
- Department: Santa Ana

Government
  - Type: Republic
  - Mayor: Carlos Landaverde

Area
  - Municipality: 258.06 sq mi (668.36 km^{2})
- Elevation: 1,540 ft (470 m)

Population (2024)
  - District: 63,763
  - Rank: 22nd in El Salvador; 3rd in Santa Ana Department
  - Urban: 24,605
  - Seat/Locality: 19,143

Metapán is a city and municipality in the Santa Ana department of El Salvador. Metapán is situated in the northern part of the department, bordering Honduras and Guatemala. It is the second largest city in the department after Santa Ana and is divided between 29 cantones.

== Geography ==
The city of Metapán, next to the San Jose River, lies at 470 meters above sea level. It is located 46 kilometers north of Santa Ana city, connected via a paved highway. The municipality extends beyond the city and into the country surrounding the city. The major Hydroelectric Power station at the Guajoyo river is located in Metapán. The eastern side of Lake Güija is located in the municipality.

== History ==
Metapán means in the Nahuatl language “River of The Maguey,” from met (maguey) and apan (River). The area around the city was originally populated by Chʼortiʼ people. After the Spanish conquest and subsequent independence of the country, the city formed part of the Sonsonate Department until the Santa Ana department was created in 1855.

=== Church ===
Metapán is known for its well preserved colonial church. The church has the following dimensions: 60 yards long by 14 wide, of entablature and tile: Doric and Tuscan order. Its construction began in 1736 and concluded on June 11, 1743, due to the zeal and efficiency of the priest Francisco Javier Estrada.

In the center of the round of the choir it reads: “this building of Metapán was finished in June of 1743,” in blue blurred letters. There is also an image of “El Señor Angue”, a sculpture of Crucified Christ that dates back to the 17th century. In recent years there has been a large growth of Pentecostal Protestants, which continues to grow.

== Economy ==
Historically, Metapán is known for iron ore production. The city had up to three furnaces for smelting. As of 1850, the city was producing 150 tons of iron a year. British researcher John Baily described the iron as being of "high character...and is found to be superior to that generally imported for making axes and other heavy cutting instruments in common use."

== Notable people ==
- Narciso Orellana, professional footballer

== Sport ==
Metapán is home to football team A.D. Isidro Metapán. Isidro Metapán recently has emerged as one of the top clubs of El Salvador, having won a total of ten first division titles since joining the first division of Salvadoran football, Primera División. It is also home to Segunda División de El Salvador team Leones de Metapan.
