= Juan Quarterone =

Argentine footballer and manager

Juan Quartarone
Personal information
- Full name: Juan Quartarone Carbone
- Date of birth: 28 May 1935
- Place of birth: Avellaneda, Argentina
- Date of death: 23 November 2015 (aged 80)
- Place of death: Santa Tecla, El Salvador
- Position: Midfielder

Senior career*
Years	Team	Apps	(Gls)
1951–1955	Racing Club		
1956	Quilmes	20	(0)
1957	Huracán	1	(0)
1958–1959	Platense (ARG)	6	(0)
1960	San Luis de Quillota		
1961–1962	Recreativo de Córdoba		
1963–1964	Loma Negra		
1965	CSD Municipal		
1966–1968	Juventud Olímpica		
1969–1970	UES		
1971	UCA		

Managerial career
- 1973: Juventud Olímpica
- 1974–1975: Platense (SLV)
- 1976–1978: Atlético Marte
- 1980: Aurora FC
- 1983–84: FAS
- 1984: El Salvador
- 1985–1986: Alianza
- 1987: Olimpia
- 1988: Luis Ángel Firpo
- 1992: Águila
- 1993–1994: Cojutepeque
- 1995: Clima
- 1996–1997: Atlético Marte
- 1999–2000: ADET
- 2003: Alianza
- 2004: Atlético Balboa
- 2005–2006: San Salvador FC
- 2007: Independiente Nacional
- * Club domestic league appearances and goals

Juan Quartarone Carbone (28 May 1935 – 23 November 2015) was an Argentine football midfielder.

Nickname El Brujo (The Wizard), he played in Argentina and El Salvador. After retiring as a player, he coached a number of teams in El Salvador and the El Salvador national team.

Juan Quartarone died on 23 November 2015 due to Alzheimer's disease.

== Achievements ==
Year	Finish	Team	Tournament	Role	Notes
1951	Champion	Racing Club	1st Division Argentina	Player	
1965	Champion	CSD Municipal	1st Division Guatemala	Player	
1973	Champion	Juventud Olímpica	1st Division El Salvador	Coach	
1974-75	Champion	Platense (El Salvador)	1st Division El Salvador	Coach	
1974-75	Champion	Platense (El Salvador)	Torneo Fraternidad/UNCAF Club Championship	Coach	
1983	Champion	FAS	1st Division El Salvador	Coach	
1986	Champion	Alianza	1st Division El Salvador	Coach	
1987	Champions	Olimpia	1st Division Honduras	Coach	
2000	Runners up	ADET	1st Division El Salvador	Coach	
2004	Runners up	Atletico Balboa	1st Division El Salvador	Coach	
