= ADET =

Association football club in El Salvador

- Full name: Asociación Deportiva El Tránsito
- Nickname: Los Venados
- Founded: 1974
- Ground: Estadio Hanz Usko, San Salvador, El Salvador
- League: Tercera Division de Fútbol Salvadoreño

Asociación Deportiva El Tránsito, commonly known just as ADET, is a professional soccer club located in Hacienda El Tránsito,Talnique ,La Libertad Department.

== History ==
=== Demise ===
ADET ownership had reportedly experienced thousands dollars in operating losses since 2000, according to players and the team presidents the club had gone two years without corporate sponsorships and the municipality of Libertad withdrew its support. In the final game of the season against FAS they played in front 146 supporters and lost almost 13,000 dollars. For the Clausura 2002, the club decided to sell its spot in the Salvadoran Premier Division to newly formed club San Salvador F.C.

=== Merger years (2025-Present) ===
In 2025, The club merged with Aruba to form ADET-Aruba and they played in the second division. The soon merged with INCA to become ARUBA-INCA

== Honours ==
ADET's first trophy was the Liga Ascensio, which they won in 1983. They won 3 Segunda División title in 1983, 1987–88 and 1990–91.

ADET's honours include the following:

=== Domestic honours ===
==== Leagues ====
- Primera División de Fútbol de El Salvador
  - Runners up (1): Clausura 2000
- Segunda División Salvadorean and predecessors
  - Champions: (3): 1983, 1987–88, 1990–91

==== Cups ====
- Copa Champions Tourney: and predecessors
  - Champions (1): 1981

== Stadium ==
- Estadio Hanz Usko, San Salvador, El Salvador (TBD–Present)
  - Estadio C. Sello de Oro; San Salvador (TBD) International games prior to the building of Estadio Cuscatlán

ADET plays its home games at Estadio Hanz Usko located in San Salvador. The stadium has a capacity of 3,000 people

== Notable players ==
=== Domestic and foreign players ===
Players with senior international caps:

- (El Salvador) Sergio Valencia
- (El Salvador) Santos Rivera
- (El Salvador) Mauricio Quintanilla
- (El Salvador) Erick Dowson Prado
- (El Salvador) Francisco "Chico" Contreras
- (El Salvador) Miguel Montes
- (El Salvador) Juan Carlos Panameño
- (El Salvador) Ronald Cerritos
- (Guatemala) (El Salvador) Edward Cocherari
- (Honduras) Jorge Armando «Tin» Martinez († -2002)
- (Honduras) Karl Roland († 1964-2020)
- (Honduras) Julio César Arzú

=== Team captains ===
Name	Years
(El Salvador) Nartin Adrian Contreras	1986
(El Salvador) Sergio Valencia	1989-1995
(El Salvador) Ramírez Moisa	1995-1997
(El Salvador) Francisco Contreras Chico	1997-2000

== Head coaches ==
- (El Salvador) Raúl Corcio Zavaleta
- (El Salvador) Héctor Palomo Sol (1986–88)
- (El Salvador) Jorge Alberto Cruz (1990–1991)
- (El Salvador) Victor Manuel Pacheco (1990–1993)
- (El Salvador) Pedro Tobías (1996–1998)
- (El Salvador) Armando Contreras Palma (1994–1996)
- (El Salvador) Victor Manuel Pacheco (1997-October 1998)
- (El Salvador) Luis Angel Leon (October 1998- March 1998)
- (Argentina) Juan Quarterone (March 1999 – 2001)

== Records ==
=== Club records ===
- First Match (prior to creation of a league): vs. TBD (a club from TBD), Year
- First Match (official): vs. TBD, year
- Most points in La Primera: 00 points (00 win, 00 draws, 0 losses) Year/Year
- Least points in La Primera: 00 points (0 win, 0 draws, 00 losses) Year/year

=== Individual records ===
- Most capped player for El Salvador: 73 (28 whilst at ADET-Baygon), Ronald Cerritos
- Most international caps for El Salvador while an ADET-Baygon player: 28 (73 caps overall), Ronald Cerritos
- Most goals in a season, all competitions: unknown player, O (Year/year) (00 in League, 00 in Cup competitions)
- Most goals in a season, La Primera: TBD, 7
- All time goalscorer: Carlos Francisco "Chico" Contreras 126 goals (1988-1989; 1991-2000)
