= A.D. Isidro Metapán =

Association football club in El Salvador

Isidro Metapán
- Full name: Asociación Deportiva Isidro Metapán
- Nicknames: Los Caleros (The Caleros); Los Cementeros (The Cementers); Los Jaguares (The Jaguars)
- Founded: 29 September 1950; 76 years ago (as Isidro Menéndez); 2 June 2000; 26 years ago (as Isidro Metapan)
- Ground: Estadio Jorge Calero Suárez
- Capacity: 10,000
- Chairman: (El Salvador) Rafael Morataya
- Manager: (El Salvador) TBD
- League: (El Salvador) Primera División
- 2026 Clausura: Overall: 7th Playoffs: Quarter-Final
Home colours	Away colours

Asociación Deportiva Isidro Metapán, also known simply as Isidro Metapán, is a Salvadoran sports club based in Metapán, Santa Ana, El Salvador.

It is best known for its professional football team, which plays in the Primera División, the top tier of the El Salvador football league system, they have won 10 National League titles in El Salvador football.

Isidro Metapán was founded in 2000, after the merger of Isidro Menéndez and Metapán FC. The club had its period of greatest success in the 2000s.

Since the formation of the Apertura/Clausura, A.D. Isidro Metapán has been the dominant club in El Salvador football, winning ten championships. Their traditional local rivals are FAS.

Since the beginning of the 2000–01 season, A.D. Isidro Metapán has played its home games at the Estadio Jorge Calero Suárez. The team colours are blue, red and white, and the team crest shows the white and blue and the Jaguar. The club has other departments in basketball, and others.

== History ==
=== Present history ===
In 2000, Metapán FC and Isidro Menéndez, two Second Division strugglers, chose to merge. In 2001, the newly born club won promotion to the Primera División with a 3–2 playoff win over Jocoro FC.

The club quickly consolidated their position as a mid-table side, and starting in Apertura 2004 began making title pushes. They qualified for the playoffs for the first time that year by defeating Luis Ángel Firpo in a fourth place playoff. In Apertura 2005, they finished the regular atop the table, defeated Once Municipal in the semi-finals, and only fell short of their first title after a 2–0 extra time loss to Vista Hermosa.

In Clausura 2007, the club finally bettered that result, taking home their first ever championship with a 1–0 extra time win over Luis Ángel Firpo. That qualified the team for the CONCACAF Champions League for the very first time, although they did not get past the preliminary rounds.

Over the next several years, Isidro Metapán began to surpass the traditional powers of Salvadoran football (FAS, Firpo, Alianza, and Águila). They won their second title in a penalty shootout over Chalatenango in Apertura 2008, then defended their crown in Clausura 2009 with a 1–0 win over Luis Ángel Firpo. Alexander Amaya scored the winner in the 58th minute.

After a near miss in the Apertura 2009, Isidro returned to the top for the third time in four seasons by winning the championship of Clausura 2010. Léster Blanco and Paolo Suárez each scored in a 3–2 win over Águila. In each season from 2007 to 2010, the club had won the title at least once. They would win it for a fourth time in five in Apertura 2010, beating Alianza 4–3 in a penalty shootout.

2011–2012 was the most successful season in club history. It started in the summer, in the CONCACAF Champions League. Metapan qualified for the group stages, and a 2–0 win over Mexican team Santos Laguna allowed them to qualify out of the groups into the quarterfinals for the first time. Although UNAM Pumas eliminated them at that stage, it had still been a very successful run.

Meanwhile, domestically, Metapán won a sixth title in eight years with a 1–0 victory over Once Municipal the only goal coming from Paolo Suárez in the 51st minute.

They narrowly missed a repeat that spring in the Clausura, losing 2–1 to Áquila in the championship match. However, they recovered to win a seventh championship in nine years, defeating Alianza in extra time to win the Apertura 2012. For a moment it looked like the hero would be Metapán's top goal scorer Nicolás Muñoz, who scored from a free kick in extra time. However Sean Fraser of Alianza equalized with a header, forcing the match into penalties. After a dramatic shootout, Isidro Metapán won 6–5.

They won their 8th title in Apertura 2013, beating FAS 1–0 on a goal from Andrés Flores in the 85th minute.

On 25 May 2014 Isidro Metapán won the Primera División title for the ninth time in the club history, defeating Dragón on penalties 6–5.

Title number 10 came in Apertura 2014, as Metapán defeated Águila in penalties 3–2. Once again, Nicolás Muñoz played a very important role in taking the match to penalties with an extra time goal.

== Sponsorship ==
=== Shirt sponsors and manufacturers ===
Season	Kit Manufacturer	Sponsors
2000	Milán	CESSA
2001–02	Milán	CESSA, Texaco, Coca-Cola
2003–04	Milán	CESSA
2005	Milán	CESSA
2006	Milán	CESSA, Tigo, Hankook
2007	Milán	Tigo, Dunlop
2008	Milán	Tigo, Arroz San Pedro, Salazar
2009	Milán	Bimbo, Tigo, Salazar, MK Medicementos
2010	Milán	Bimbo, Tigo, Cartan Global
2011–2013	Milán	Bimbo, Holcim, Arroz San Pedro
2014–15	Milán	Bimbo, Holcim, Arroz San Pedro, Don Chilo
2016–17	Milán	Gumarsal, Concentrados, AgroAmigo, Arroz San Pedro, Don Chilo, SalzarRomeo.com, Industrias La Constancia
2017–2020	Milán	Arroz San Pedro, Gumarsal
2021–2022	Milán	las Perlitas, Auto Repuestos Herrera, Canal 4, Sudagrip, Arroz San Pedro
2022–2023	Milán	Repuestos El León, Sudagrip, PAILL Laboratories, La Esperanza Resort and Hotel
2023–2024	Milán	Sudagrip, PAILL Laboratories, Ferretería El Indio, Concentrados Agroamigo, Analizar Laboratorio El Salvador
2024-2025	Elite Sports	Sudagrip, L-Car Supamercado, PAILL Laboratories, Ferretería El Indio, Concentrados Agroamigo
2025-2026	Elite Sports	Holcim, Geniusbet, BEMISAL, Ferretería El Indio, Taller Polas
2026–Present	Elite Sports	GeniusBet El Salvador, BEMISAL, Ferretería El Indio, Concentrados Agroamigo, Electorlit, Salazar Romero S.A. de C.V, Agua Las Perlitas, Analizar Laboratorio El Salvador

== Home stadiums ==
The team currently plays in the Estadio Jorge Calero Suárez. The stadium is located in Metapán, Santa Ana. A new stadium is currently being built and is expected to be finished in the year 2015 or 2016

- Estadio Jorge Calero Suárez (2000–)
- Complejo Deportivo Metapán

=== New Stadium ===
The 2015–16 season was to have been the last season at the Estadio Jorge Calero Suárez, with the club moving to their new 10,000-seater stadium Complejo Deportivo Metapán in time for the 2017–18 season. However, due to the club being in financial crisis, work on the new stadium has since stopped.

== Honours ==
- Primera División
  - Champions (10): Clausura 2007, Apertura 2008, Clausura 2009, Clausura 2010, Apertura 2010, Apertura 2011, Apertura 2012, Apertura 2013, Clausura 2014, Apertura 2014
- Liga de Ascenso
  - Champions (1): 2000–01

== Performance in International competitions ==
- Copa Interclubes UNCAF: 1 appearance

Best: First Round 2007
2007: First Round

- CONCACAF Champions League: 7 appearances

Best: Quarter-final 2011–12
2008–09: Preliminary Round
2009–10: Group stage
2010–11: Preliminary Round
2011–12: Quarter-final
2012–13: Group stage
2013–14: Group stage
2014–15: Group stage
2015–16: Group stage

- Copa Mesoamericana: 1 appearance

Best: Runner-up 2011
2011: Runner-up

== Records and statistics ==
Metapan have won 10 domestic trophies, including the league ten times. From 2009 to 2011, the club won five successive league titles, equalling the all-time record.

Isidro Metapan's name is attached to a number of Primera division and CONCACAF records:

- The Isidro Metapan player with the most appearances is Hector Omar Mejia, with 518 in all competitions.
- The Isidro Metapan player with the most goals is Williams Reyes, with 77 in all competitions

== Players ==
=== Current squad ===
As of July 2026 Note: Flags indicate national team as defined under FIFA eligibility rules; some limited exceptions apply. Players may hold more than one non-FIFA nationality.

No.	Pos.	Nation	Player
1	GK	ESA	Óscar Pleitez (Vice captain)
3	DF	ESA	Melvin Cruz
5	MF	ESA	Cesar Flores
6	MF	ESA	Melvin Cartagena (Captain)
8	MF	ESA	Julio Amaya
9	FW	ARG	Federico Haberkorn
10	MF	ESA	Marvin Monterroza
11	FW	ESA	Jose Posada
12	DF	ESA	Raul Cruz
14	DF	ESA	Miguel Lemus
15	DF	ESA	Jose Zaldana
17	MF	ESA	Emerson Sandoval
19	MF	ESA	Carlos Ortiz
23	FW	ESA	Steven Guerra
24	DF	URU	Nicolás Gómez
27	DF	ESA	Mario Jacobo
28	FW	ESA	Kevin Reyes
30	GK	ARG	Javier Colli
31	FW	ESA	Uriel Miranda
38	DF	ESA	Jose Pacheco
59	MF	ESA	Eduardo Galdamez

No.	Pos.	Nation	Player
58	GK	ESA	Alfredo Esquivel
16	DF	ESA	Gael Avelar
25	DF	ESA	Kevin Vidal
21	DF	ESA	Leonel Aguilar
7	MF	URU	Gustavo Machado
43	FW	ESA	Mario Erazo
39	FW	ESA	Jefferson Lemus

=== Out on loan ===
Note: Flags indicate national team as defined under FIFA eligibility rules; some limited exceptions apply. Players may hold more than one non-FIFA nationality.

No.	Pos.	Nation	Player
38	DF	ESA	Bayron López (at Fuerte San Francisco for the 2025-26 Apertura and Clausura)
52	FW	ECU	Dany Cetré (at Fuerte San Francisco for the 2025-26 Apertura and Clausura)

=== In ===
Note: Flags indicate national team as defined under FIFA eligibility rules; some limited exceptions apply. Players may hold more than one non-FIFA nationality.

No.	Pos.	Nation	Player
—		ESA	Emerson Sandoval (From Platense)
—		ESA	José Posada (From Hércules)
—		ESA	Jose Zaldana (From Zacatecoluca)
—		ESA	César Flores (From Hércules)
—		ESA	Carlos Ortiz (From Aguila)

No.	Pos.	Nation	Player
—		ESA	Melvin Cruz (From Fuerte San Francisco)
—		ARG	Federico Haberkorn (From TBD)
—		ESA	Mario Jacobo (From Alianza)
—	GK	ARG	Javier Colli (From Marquense)

=== Out ===
Note: Flags indicate national team as defined under FIFA eligibility rules; some limited exceptions apply. Players may hold more than one non-FIFA nationality.

No.	Pos.	Nation	Player
—		URU	Emiliano Villar (To Injured)
—		ESA	Roberto Domínguez (To Inter Santa Tecla)
—		ESA	Giovanni Ávila (To Fuerte San Francisco)
—	GK	ESA	Cristofer Maldonado (To TBD)
—		ESA	Elvin Alvarado (To TBD)
—	DF	ESA	Milton Molina (To TBD)

No.	Pos.	Nation	Player
—		ESA	Jesus Gonzalez (To TBD)
—		ESA	Nelson Zavala (To TBD)
—		COL	Jhonatan Urrutia (To INCA-Aruba)
—	DF	ESA	Carlos Anzora (To INCA-Aruba)
—		COL	Jesus Zuninga (To TBD)

== Current coaching staff ==
As of June 21, 2026.

Position	Staff
Manager	(Argentina) Gabriel Alvarez (*)
Assistant Manager	(El Salvador) TBD (*)
Assistant Manager and Video Analyst	(Argentina) TBD (*)
Reserve manager	(El Salvador) Jose Cerna (*)
Under 17 Manager	(El Salvador) Alfredo Saavedra (*)
Under 15 Manager	(El Salvador) Jose Oswaldo Figueroa (*)
Goalkeeper coach	TBD (*)
Physical Trainer	(Colombia) Duvan Echeverri (*)
Physical Trainer Juniors	(El Salvador) Irvin Garcia (*)
Ladies manager	(El Salvador) Jose Oswaldo Figueroa (*)
Physiotherapy	(Brazil) TBD (*)
Utility	(El Salvador) William Martinez and (El Salvador) Jonathan Avelar
Kinesiologo	(El Salvador) Roberto Antonio Bayona
Sports director	(El Salvador) Edwin Portillo *

== Management Staff 2025/26 ==
Position	Staff
Owner	(El Salvador) Asociación Deportiva Metapan
President	(El Salvador) Lic. Rafael Morataya
Vice-President	(El Salvador) Ing. Juan Samayoa
Vice-President Suplente	(El Salvador) Lic. Israel Peraza
Gerente Deportivo	(El Salvador) Prof. Edwin Portillo
Team-Representative	(El Salvador) Lic. Fredy Vega
Team-Representative Sport	(El Salvador) Prof. Roberto Campos

=== Management ===
Position	Name
Owner	Asociación Deportiva Isidro Metapán
President	Rafael Morataya
Vice President	Juan Umaña Samayoa
Administrative Manager	Fredy Vega
Representative of the Isidro Metapan club	Roberto Campos
Sports director	Carlos Martinez

== List of notable players ==
=== List of retired numbers ===
2 -Retired in 2026 in recognition of defender Milton Molina, who at time of his departure was the longest serving player for Isidro Metapan. He played over 500 games and won 8 titles.

15 – Retired in 2011 in recognition of goalkeeper Álvaro Misael Alfaro. Alfaro was a major player for Metapán who suffered a neck injury which forced him to retire from the game. In 2011, the number was brought out of retirement and given to back-up goalkeeper.

18 – Retired in 2011 in recognition of midfielder Nelson Rivera. Rivera was shot in the head and died after unknown gunmen attacked the car he was traveling in. The number was brought out of retirement in 2012.

20 – Retired in 2015 in recognition of midfielder Héctor Mejía. Mejía was a long serving and major player for Metapán, he participated in all 10 of Metapán title victories. He retired as Metapán most decorated and most capped player in their history.

=== One-club men ===
Name	Nationality	Position	Metapan Debut	Metapan Last Match
Enllelbert González	El Salvador	GK	1997	2011
Edwin Portillo	El Salvador	DF	1979	1990
Erick Dowson Prado	El Salvador	DF	2002	2011
Héctor Mejía	El Salvador	MF	2000	2015
Milton Molina	El Salvador	DF	2009	2026

== List of coaches ==
Isidro Metapán has had 12 permanent managers and 3 temporary manager since the club was formed after the merger of Metapán FC and Isidro Menéndez FC. Edwin Portillo holds the record for most championships won with the club with 7, longest-serving manager in terms of time consecutively of time with 8 years between 2006 and 2013, and most tenures as coach of Metapán with 6. Jorge Rodríguez the manager holds the record with most consecutive titles with three. This list also includes the coaches who coached CESSA/Metapán FC and Isidro Menéndez

Name	Period	Trophies
(El Salvador) Rafael Osorio	1985	
(El Salvador) Francisco Javier Flores "Paco Flores"	1974	
(El Salvador) Edgardo Monroy	1984–85	
(El Salvador) Conrado Miranda † (1928-2021)	1985	
(El Salvador) Adonay Castillo	1986	
(El Salvador) Jorge Suárez † (1945-1997)	1988	
(Brazil) João Cassiano de Oliveira	1991	
(El Salvador) Ricardo Guardado	1991	
(El Salvador) Francisco Javier Flores "Paco Flores"	1994	
(El Salvador) Calazán Quintana	1996–1997	
(El Salvador) Nelson Mauricio Ancheta	1999	
(El Salvador) Edwin Portillo	2000 – Oct 2001	Liga de Ascenso
(El Salvador) José Calazán (Interim)	October 2001 – January 2002	
(Argentina) Roberto Fabrizio	February 2002 – September 2002	
(El Salvador) Edwin Portillo	October 2002 – June 2003	
(Argentina) Raúl Héctor Cocherari	June 2003 – October 2003	
(El Salvador) René Ramírez	November 2003 – January 2004	
(Uruguay) Saul Rivero † (1954-2022)	February 2004 – June 2004	
(Argentina) Marcelo Javier Zuleta	June 2004 – August 2004	
(El Salvador) Edwin Portillo	August 2004 – June 2005	
(Uruguay) Rubén Alonso	July 2005 – October 2006	
(El Salvador) Edwin Portillo	Oct 2006 – March 2013	Clausura 2007, Apertura 2008, Clausura 2009, Clausura 2010, Apertura 2010, Apertura 2011, Apertura 2012
(El Salvador) Jorge Rodríguez	March 2013 – December 2016	Apertura 2013, Clausura 2014, Apertura 2014
(Paraguay) (Argentina) Roberto Gamarra	December 2016 – April 2017	
(El Salvador) Misael Alfaro (Interim)	April 2017	
(El Salvador) Edwin Portillo	May 2017 – May 2018	
(Peru) Agustín Castillo	May 2018 – December 2018	
(El Salvador) Edwin Portillo	December 2018 – December 2019	
(El Salvador) Victor Coreas	December 2019 – December 2020	
(El Salvador) Jose Oswaldo Figueroa (Interim)	December 2020 – January 2021	
(Spain) Juan Cortez	January 2021 – August 2021	
(El Salvador) Misael Alfaro	August 2021 – October 2021	
(El Salvador) Hector Omar Mejia	November 2021 – December 2022	
(El Salvador) Jorge Rodríguez	December 2022 – December 2023	
(Argentina) Julio Zamora	December 2023 – April 2024	
(Argentina) Carlos Martinez (Interim)	April 2024 – June 2024	
(El Salvador) Hector Omar Mejia	July 2024 – December 2024	
(El Salvador) Erick Prado	December 2024 – August 2025	
(El Salvador) Efrain Burgos	August 2025 – April 2026	
(El Salvador) Hector Omar Mejia (Interim)	April 2026 – present	

== Other departments ==
=== Football ===
==== Reserve team ====
The reserve team serves mainly as the final stepping stone for promising young players under the age of 21 before being promoted to the main team. The second team is coached by TBD. the team played in the Primera División Reserves, their greatest successes was winning the Reserve championships four times in Apertura 2013, Clausura 2014, Clausura 2015, Clausura 2018.

=== List of Coaches ===
Name	Nat	Tenure	Titles
TBD	(El Salvador)	N/A	
José Oswaldo Figueroa	(El Salvador)	2013	Apertura 2013
Carlos Martínez	(Argentina)	2014	Clausura 2014
José Oswaldo Figueroa	(El Salvador)	2014, 2015	Clausura 2015
Hector Omar Mejia	(El Salvador)	2018	Clausura 2018
Samuel Maldonado	(El Salvador)	2021, 2022	
Samuel Maldonado	(El Salvador)	2024	
Hector Omar Mejia	(El Salvador)	2025	
Jose Cerna	(El Salvador)	2026 - Present	

=== Current squad ===
As of: June, 2025 Note: Flags indicate national team as defined under FIFA eligibility rules; some limited exceptions apply. Players may hold more than one non-FIFA nationality.

No.	Pos.	Nation	Player
—	DF	ESA	Hugo Aguilar
—	MF	ESA	Mauricio Zabala
—	MF	ESA	Jonathan Lopez
—	MF	ESA	Uriel Miranda
—		ESA	TBD

No.	Pos.	Nation	Player
—		ESA	TBD
—		ESA	TBD
—		ESA	TBD
—		ESA	TBD
—		ESA	TBD

==== Junior teams ====
The youth team's greatest success was winning the 2023 Apertura 3-2 penalties after tying 2-2 after 120 minutes.

=== List of Coaches ===
Name	Nat	Tenure
TBD	(El Salvador)	N/A
Alfredo Saavedra	(El Salvador)	2024
TBD	(El Salvador)	2025 - Present

=== Current squad ===
As of: June, 2025 Note: Flags indicate national team as defined under FIFA eligibility rules; some limited exceptions apply. Players may hold more than one non-FIFA nationality.

No.	Pos.	Nation	Player
—	GK	ESA	Alfredo Esquivel
—		ESA	TBD
—		ESA	TBD
—		ESA	TBD
—		ESA	TBD

No.	Pos.	Nation	Player
—		ESA	TBD
—		ESA	TBD
—		ESA	TBD
—		ESA	TBD
—		ESA	TBD

=== World Cup players ===
Players that have played for Isidro Metapan in their career and played in a U-17 World Cup:

- (El Salvador) Alfredo Esquivel (2025)

==== Women's team ====
The women's first team, which is led by head coach Cristian Zañas, features several members of the El Salvador national ladies team. Their greatest successes was winning the 2021 Clausura 3-2 penalties.

=== List of Coaches ===
Name	Nat	Tenure
Miriam de la O	(El Salvador)	2019
Lesly Ventura	(El Salvador)	2022-2024
Oswaldo Figueroa	(El Salvador)	2025 - Present

=== Current squad ===
As of: July, 2025 Note: Flags indicate national team as defined under FIFA eligibility rules; some limited exceptions apply. Players may hold more than one non-FIFA nationality.

No.	Pos.	Nation	Player
2		ESA	Estefany Arriola
3		ESA	Andrea Henriquez
5		ESA	Gabriela Menjivar
6		ESA	Alejandra Castro
7		ESA	Ana Miranda (captain)
8		ESA	Juleysi Guadalupe Miranda
9		ESA	Heidi Guerra
10		ESA	Nuria Merlos
11		ESA	Itsel Batres
12		ESA	Wendy Ayala
14		ESA	Brenda Herrera
15		ESA	Yeni Alicia Martinez

No.	Pos.	Nation	Player
16		ESA	Ivis Ruano
17		ESA	Giselle Orellana
19		ESA	Dani Valladares
20		ESA	Maria Isabel Morales
21		ESA	Maria Verganza
22		ESA	Yaritza Sanchez
23		ESA	Elsy Alexandria Lopez
24		ESA	Andrea Perez
25		ESA	Alisson Orellana

=== In ===
Note: Flags indicate national team as defined under FIFA eligibility rules; some limited exceptions apply. Players may hold more than one non-FIFA nationality.

No.	Pos.	Nation	Player
—		ESA	TBD (From TBD)
—		ESA	TBD (From TBD)
—		ESA	TBD (From TBD)
—		ESA	TBD (From TBD)
—		ESA	TBD (From TBD)

No.	Pos.	Nation	Player
—		ESA	TBD (From TBD)
—		ESA	TBD (From TBD)
—		ESA	TBD (From TBD)
—		ESA	TBD (From TBD)
—		ESA	TBD (From TBD)

=== Out ===
Note: Flags indicate national team as defined under FIFA eligibility rules; some limited exceptions apply. Players may hold more than one non-FIFA nationality.

No.	Pos.	Nation	Player
—		ESA	Gabriela Menjivar (To TBD)
—		ESA	Ana Miranda (To Aguila Femenino)
—		ESA	TBD (To TBD)

No.	Pos.	Nation	Player
—		ESA	TBD (To TBD)
—		ESA	TBD (To TBD)
—		ESA	TBD (To TBD)

=== Other sports ===
Isidro Metapan has other departments for a variety of sports.

==== Basketball ====
AD Isidro Metapan Básquetbol Club was founded in 2015 and play Liga Mayor de Baloncesto (LMB) which is the highest level in El Salvador league tier. the club is led by head coach TBD, the club features several key members including Nigerian Deji Akindele and TBD. Their greatest successes were winning the 2015 Clausura

Notable players: Nigerian Deji Akindele, Panamanian Jonathan King, Nicaraguan Bartel López, Past coaches: Darwin Veliz (2017)
