= Primera División de Fútbol Profesional Apertura 2005 =

Primera División de Fútbol Profesional de El Salvador
- Champions: C.D. Vista Hermosa (1st title)
- Relegated: None
- Top goalscorer: (El Salvador) TBD (11)

The Primera División de Fútbol Profesional Apertura 2005 season (officially "Torneo Apertura 2004") started on August 13, 2005.

The season was composed of the following clubs:

- C.D. FAS
- C.D. Vista Hermosa
- San Salvador F.C.
- C.D. Águila
- C.D. Luis Ángel Firpo
- A.D. Isidro Metapán
- C.D. Atlético Balboa
- Alianza F.C.
- C.D. Chalatenango
- Once Municipal

== Team information ==
=== Personnel and sponsoring ===
| Team | Chairman | Head coach | Kitmaker | Shirt sponsor |
|---|---|---|---|---|
| Águila | (El Salvador) | (Serbia and Montenegro) Vladan Vicevic | TBD | TBD |
| Alianza | (El Salvador) | (Chile) Oscar del Solar | TBD | TBD |
| Atletico Balboa | (El Salvador) Noel Benítez | (Colombia) Henry Vanegas | TBD | TBD |
| C.D. Chalatenango | (El Salvador) | (Guatemala) Carlos Alberto Mijangos | | |
| FAS | (El Salvador) Reynaldo Valle | (El Salvador) Nelson Mauricio Ancheta | TBD | TBD |
| Firpo | (El Salvador) TBD | (El Salvador) Leonel Carcamo | TBD | TBD |
| Isidro Metapan | (El Salvador) José Gumercindo Landaverde | (Uruguay) Ruben Alonso | TBD | TBD |
| Once Municipal | (El Salvador) TBD | (Uruguay) Miguel Mansilla | TBD | TBD |
| San Salvador F.C. | (El Salvador) Marco Flores | (El Salvador) Juan Ramon Paredes | TBD | TBD |
| C.D. Vista Hermosa | (El Salvador) TBD | (El Salvador) Jose Mario Martinez | TBD | TBD |

== Managerial changes ==
=== Before the season ===
| Team | Outgoing manager | Manner of departure | Date of vacancy | Replaced by | Date of appointment | Position in table |
|---|---|---|---|---|---|---|
| C.D. Aguila | (El Salvador) Saul Molina | TBD | June 2005 | (Serbia and Montenegro) Vladan Vicevic | June 2005 | |
| San Salvador F.C. | (Argentina) Hugo Coria | TBD | June 2005 | (El Salvador) Juan Ramon Paredes | June 2005 | |
| Alianza F.C. | (El Salvador) Juan Ramon Paredes | TBD | June 2005 | (Colombia) Richard Parra | July 2005 | |
| Metapan | (El Salvador) Edwin Portillo | TBD | July 2005 | (Uruguay) Ruben Alonso | July 2005 | |
| Alianza F.C. | (Colombia) Richard Parra | TBD | August 2005 | (Chile) Oscar del Solar | August 2005 | |
| C.D. FAS | (Peru) Agustin Castillo | TBD | August 2005 | (El Salvador) Nelson Mauricio Ancheta | August 2005 | |

=== During the season ===
| Team | Outgoing manager | Manner of departure | Date of vacancy | Replaced by | Date of appointment | Position in table |
|---|---|---|---|---|---|---|
| C.D. Chalatenango | (Guatemala) Carlos Alberto Mijangos | TBD | September 2005 | (Peru) Agustin Castillo | September 2005 | |
| Atletico Balboa | (Colombia) Henry Vanegas | TBD | September 2005 | (Argentina) Jorge Alberto Garcia | September 2005 | |
| FAS | (El Salvador) Nelson Mauricio Ancheta | TBD | October 2005 | (Mexico) Carlos de los Cobos | October 2005 | |
| San Salvador F.C. | (El Salvador) Juan Ramon Paredes | TBD | October 2005 | (Argentina) Juan Quarterone | October 2005 | |

== Apertura 2005 standings ==
Last updated August 25, 2007

| Pos | Team | Pld | W | D | L | GF | GA | GD | Pts |
|---|---|---|---|---|---|---|---|---|---|
| 1 | A.D. Isidro Metapán | 18 | 10 | 6 | 2 | 25 | 13 | +12 | 36 |
| 2 | C.D. Vista Hermosa | 18 | 10 | 1 | 7 | 28 | 26 | +2 | 31 |
| 3 | C.D. Luis Ángel Firpo | 18 | 7 | 6 | 5 | 27 | 17 | +10 | 27 |
| 4 | Once Municipal | 18 | 7 | 5 | 6 | 25 | 20 | +5 | 26 |
| 5 | San Salvador F.C. | 18 | 6 | 6 | 6 | 22 | 26 | −4 | 24 |
| 6 | C.D. Águila | 18 | 5 | 8 | 5 | 24 | 20 | +4 | 23 |
| 7 | C.D. FAS | 18 | 5 | 7 | 6 | 21 | 21 | 0 | 22 |
| 8 | Alianza F.C. | 18 | 5 | 5 | 8 | 20 | 27 | −7 | 20 |
| 9 | C.D. Chalatenango (Note: Chalatenango bought place of newly promoted Coca-Cola) | 18 | 5 | 5 | 8 | 15 | 29 | −14 | 20 |
| 10 | C.D. Atlético Balboa | 18 | 3 | 5 | 10 | 26 | 36 | −10 | 14 |

== Top scorers ==
| Pos. | Nat. | Player | Team | Goals |
|---|---|---|---|---|
| 1 | (El Salvador) | Alex Amílcar Erazo | C.D. Águila | 7 |
| 2 | (Colombia) | Cristian Gil Mosquera | C.D. Vista Hermosa | 7 |
| 3 | (Honduras) | Franklin Webster | C.D. Luis Ángel Firpo | 7 |
| 4 | (El Salvador) | Nelson Reyes | C.D. Atlético Balboa | 6 |
| 5 | (El Salvador) | Edler Lara | C.D. Chalatenango | 6 |
| 6 | (El Salvador) | Manfredi Portillo | C.D. Vista Hermosa | 6 |
| 7 | (El Salvador) | Manuel Martínez | C.D. Luis Ángel Firpo | 5 |

== Semifinals 1st leg ==
December 4, 2005

| C.D. Luis Ángel Firpo | 1-0 | C.D. Vista Hermosa |

December 4, 2005

| Once Municipal | 1-2 | A.D. Isidro Metapán |

== Semifinals 2nd leg ==
December 10, 2005

| C.D. Vista Hermosa | 2-1 (pen 4-2) | C.D. Luis Ángel Firpo |

December 10, 2005

| A.D. Isidro Metapán | 0-0 | Once Municipal |

== Final ==
December 18, 2005

| A.D. Isidro Metapán | 0–2 (aet) | C.D. Vista Hermosa |
|---|---|---|
| | | Mario Armando Deras 108', 122' |

Estadio Cuscatlán

Vista Hermosa:
| GK | TBA | (El Salvador) Manuel González |
| DF | TBA | (El Salvador) Yobani Romero (yellow card) 47' |
| DF | TBA | (Colombia) Luis Torres Rodriguez |
| DF | TBA | (El Salvador) Juan Carlos Chinchilla |
| DF | TBA | (El Salvador) René Domingo Álvarez | (substituted off) 67' |
| MF | TBA | (El Salvador) Eduardo Campos (yellow card) 101' |
| MF | TBA | (Colombia) Elder Figueroa |
| MF | TBA | (El Salvador) José Manfredi Portillo |
| MF | TBA | (El Salvador) Herbert Márquez |
| FW | TBA | (Argentina) Patricio Barroche | (substituted off) 120' |
| FW | TBA | (Colombia) Cristian Gil Mosquera | (substituted off) 117' |
Substitutes:
| MF | TBA | (El Salvador) Carlos Aparicio | (substituted on) 67' |
| FW | TBA | (El Salvador) Mario Deras | (substituted on) 117' |
| FW | TBA | (El Salvador) Omar Quiñónezo | (substituted on) 120' |
Manager:
(El Salvador) Mario Martínez

Isidro Metapan:
| GK | TBA | (El Salvador) Dagoberto Portillo |
| DF | TBA | (El Salvador) William Osorio |
| DF | TBA | (Uruguay) Juan Bicca (yellow card) 118' |
| DF | TBA | (El Salvador) Alexander Escobar (yellow card) 43' |
| DF | TBA | (El Salvador) Mario Aguilar | (substituted off) 76' |
| MF | TBA | (El Salvador) René Ramos |
| MF | TBA | (El Salvador) Omar Mejía |
| MF | TBA | (El Salvador) Erick Dowson Prado |
| MF | TBA | (Uruguay) Paolo Suárez | (substituted off) 92' |
| FW | TBA | (Honduras) Williams Reyes |
| FW | TBA | (Uruguay) Alcides Bandera | (substituted off) 58' |
Substitutes:
| FW | TBA | (El Salvador) Vicente Melgar | (substituted on) 58' |
| MF | TBA | (El Salvador) Guillermo Rivera | (substituted on) 76' |
| MF | TBA | (El Salvador) Juan C. Lopez | (substituted on) 92' |
Manager:
(Uruguay) Rubén Alonso

Apertura 2005 champions

1st title

== List of foreign players in the league ==
This is a list of foreign players in Apertura 2005. The following players:

1. have played at least one apertura game for the respective club.
2. have not been capped for the El Salvador national football team on any level, independently from the birthplace

C.D. Águila

- (Honduras) Jorge Wagner
- (Costa Rica) Alejandro Sequeira
- (Honduras) Fabio Ulloa
- (Colombia) James López

Alianza F.C.

- (Argentina) Gonzalo Gravano
- (Argentina) Juan Zandoná
- (Gabon) Didier Ovono
- (Mexico) Arturo Albarrán

Atletico Balboa

- (Honduras) Ernesto Noel Aquino
- (Honduras) Franklin Webster
- (Paraguay) Nestor Ayala
- (Colombia) Juan Carlos Mosquera

Chalatenango

- (Colombia) Víctor Jaramillo
- (Honduras) José Luis López
- (Argentina) Ariel Leonel González
- (Paraguay) Gabriel Garcete
- (Honduras) Centeno Renau
- (Peru) Cesar Charun

C.D. FAS

- (Colombia) Alexander Obregón
- (Panama) Nicolás Muñoz
- (Colombia) Victor Hugo Mafla
- (Brazil) Marcelo Messias
- (Paraguay) Julio Cesar Coleman
- (Costa Rica) Bernal Mullins Campbell

(player released mid season) (player Injured mid season) Injury replacement player

C.D. Luis Ángel Firpo

- (Uruguay) Juan Carlos Reyes
- (Brazil) Mauro Caju
- (Dominican Republic) Oscar Mejia

A.D. Isidro Metapán

- (Uruguay) Paolo Suarez
- (Uruguay) Alcides Bandera
- (Honduras) Williams Reyes
- (Honduras) Juan Bicca

Once Municipal

- (Ghana) James Owusu
- (Panama) Anel Canales
- (Colombia) Libardo Barbajal
- (Colombia) Juan Pablo Chacon

San Salvador F.C.

- (Brazil) Paulo Cesar Rodriguez
- (Brazil) Fábio Pereira de Azevedo
- (Colombia) Hermes Martínez Misal
- (Argentina) Rodrigo Lagos

Vista Hermosa

- (Argentina) Patricio Barroche
- (Colombia) Elder Figueroa
- (Colombia) Luis Torres Rodriguez
- (Colombia) Cristian Gil Mosquera
