= Top goalscorers in Primera División de Fútbol Profesional =

The following is a list of the highest goalscorers in Primera División de Fútbol Profesional from 1998 to present.

== List of goalscorers ==
Season	Player	Nationality	Club	Goals
Apertura 1998	Rodrigo Alfonso Osorio	(El Salvador)	Alianza	10
Clausura 1999	Emiliano Pedrozo	(Argentina)	Santa Clara	11
Apertura1999	Magdonio Corrales; Waldir Guerra	(El Salvador) (El Salvador)	Municipal Limeno; Aguila	9
Clausura 2000	Carlos Francisco Contreras	(El Salvador)	ADET	9
Apertura 2000	Williams Reyes	(Honduras)	Dragon	17
Clausura 2001	Rudis Corrales	(El Salvador)	Municipal Limeno	13
Apertura 2001	Mauro Núñez Bastos	(Brazil)	Aguila	20
Clausura 2002	Mauro Núñez Bastos	(Brazil)	Aguila	15
Apertura 2002	Alexander Obregon	(Colombia)	San Salvador	9
Clausura 2003	Alexander Campos	(El Salvador)	Aguila	13
Apertura 2003	Alexander Campos	(El Salvador)	Aguila	11
Clausura 2004	Williams Reyes	(Honduras)	FAS	14
Apertura 2004	Nicolás Muñoz	(Panama)	FAS	12
Clausura 2005	Martín García	(Colombia)	Alianza	11
Apertura 2005	Alex Amílcar Erazo; Manuel Martinez	(El Salvador) (El Salvador)	Alianza; LA Firpo	9
Clausura 2006	Patricio Barroche	(Argentina)	Vista Hermosa	14
Apertura 2006	Néstor Ayala	(Paraguay)	FAS	12
Clausura 2007	Nicolás Muñoz	(Panama)	Aguila	14
Apertura 2007	Williams Reyes; Francisco Jovel Álvarez	(Honduras) (El Salvador)	Isidro Metapan; Alianza	11
2008 Clausura	Williams Reyes	(Honduras)	Isidro Metapan	14
2008 Apertura	Carlos Ayala	(El Salvador)	Chalatenango	11
2009 Clausura	Nicolás Muñoz	(Panama)	Vista Hermosa	10
2009 Apertura	Williams Reyes; Nicolás Muñoz	(El Salvador) (Panama)	FAS; Vista Hermosa	11
2010 Clausura	José Oliveira de Souza	(Brazil)	Alianza	11
Apertura 2010	Rodolfo Zelaya; Alexander Campos	(El Salvador) (El Salvador)	Alianza; Atlético Balboa	9
Clausura 2011	Rodolfo Zelaya	(El Salvador)	Alianza	13
Apertura 2011	Nicolás Muñoz	(Panama)	Aguila	15
Clausura 2012	Nicolás Muñoz; Anel Canales	(Panama) (Panama)	Aguila; LA Firpo	12
Apertura 2012	Nicolás Muñoz; Sean Fraser	(Panama) (Jamaica)	Isidro Metapan; Alianza	12
Clausura 2013	Anel Canales	(Panama)	LA Firpo	10
Apertura 2013	Jesús Toscanini; Gonzalo Mazzia	(Uruguay) (Argentina)	Juventud Independiente; Atletico Marte	13
Clausura 2014	Williams Reyes	(El Salvador) (Honduras)	Dragon	12
Apertura 2014	Nicolás Muñoz	(Panama) (El Salvador)	Isidro Metapan	10
Clausura 2015	Hector Ramos	(Puerto Rico)	Isidro Metapan	13
Apertura 2015	David Rugamas; Rodolfo Zelaya	(El Salvador) (El Salvador)	Isidro Metapan; Alianza	12
Clausura 2016	Bladimir Díaz	(Colombia)	Chalatenango	15
Apertura 2016	Jefferson Viveros	(Colombia)	Municipal Limeno	12
Clausura 2017	Javier Lezcano	(Paraguay)	Pasaquina	11
Apertura 2017	Gustavo Guerreño; Armando Polo	(Paraguay) (Panama)	Alianza; Sonsonate	12
Clausura 2018	Luis Perea	(Colombia)	FAS	14
Apertura 2018	Rodolfo Zelaya	(El Salvador)	Alianza	14
Clausura 2019	Bladimir Díaz	(Colombia)	Alianza	16
Apertura 2019	Nicolás Muñoz	(Panama)	El Vencedor	19
Clausura 2020	Diego Areco	(Paraguay)	Jocoro	10
Apertura 2020	Nicolás Muñoz	(Panama)	Aguila	12
Clausura 2021	Rodolfo Zelaya	(El Salvador)	Alianza	8
Apertura 2021	Duvier Riascos	(Colombia)	Alianza	16
Clausura 2022	Bladimir Díaz	(Colombia)	FAS	9
Apertura 2022	Juan Carlos Argueta	(El Salvador)	Jocoro	8
Clausura 2023	Dustin Corea	(El Salvador)	Aguila	10
Apertura 2023	Carlos Salazar	(Colombia)	Aguila	15
Clausura 2024	Styven Vásquez	(El Salvador)	LA Firpo	15
Apertura 2024	Gustavo Moura	(Brazil)	LA Firpo	14
Clausura 2025	Jhonathan Urrutia	(Colombia)	Platense	09
Apertura 2025	Juan Carlos Argueta	(El Salvador)	Cacahuatique	11
Clausura 2026	Emerson Mauricio	(El Salvador)	Inter FA	15
Apetura 2026	TBD	(El Salvador)	TBD	00
Clausura 2027	TBD	(El Salvador)	TBD	00

== By club ==
As of May, 2026

No.	Club	Titles
1	Alianza	14
2	Águila	11
3	Metapán	6
4	FAS	5
5	L.Á. Firpo	5
6	Vista Hermosa	3
7	Municipal Limeño	3
8	Dragon	2
9	C.D. Chalatenango	2
10	Jocoro	2
11	ADET	1
12	Santa Clara	1
13	Atlético Balboa	1
14	San Salvador F.C.	1
15	Juventud Independiente	1
16	Atlético Marte	1
17	Pasaquina	1
18	Sonsonate	1
19	El Vencedor	1
20	Platense	1
21	Cacahuatique	1
22	Inter FA	1
Totals		65

== By country ==
No.	Country	Titles
1	El Salvador	25
2	Panama	13
3	Colombia	10
4	Honduras	4
5	Brazil	4
6	Argentina	3
7	Paraguay	3
8	Jamaica	1
9	Uruguay	1
10	Puerto Rico	1
Totals		49

== By player ==
As of January, 2026

No.	Player	Titles
1	(Panama) Nicolás Muñoz	10
2	(Honduras) (El Salvador) Williams Reyes	6
3	(El Salvador) Rodolfo Zelaya	5
4	(El Salvador) Alexander Campos	3
-	(Colombia) Bladimir Diaz	3
5	(Brazil) Mauro Núñez Bastos	2
-	(Panama) Anel Canales	2
-	(El Salvador) Juan Carlos Argueta	2
6	(El Salvador) Alex Erazo	1
-	(Colombia) Alexander Obregón	1
-	(El Salvador) Carlos Ayala	1
-	(Argentina) (El Salvador) Emiliano Pedrozo	1
-	(El Salvador) Carlos Francisco Contreras	1
-	(El Salvador) Francisco Jovel Alvarez	1
-	(Brazil) Gustavo Moura	1
-	(Brazil) José Oliveira de Souza	1
-	(El Salvador) Magdonio Corrales	1
-	(El Salvador) Manuel Martinez	1
-	(Colombia) Martín Garcia	1
-	(Paraguay) Néstor Ayala	1
-	(Argentina) Patricio Gómez Barroche	1
-	(El Salvador) Rudis Corrales	1
-	(El Salvador) Waldir Guerra	1
-	(El Salvador) Rodrigo Osorio	1
-	(Jamaica) Sean Fraser	1
-	(Argentina) Gonzalo Mazzia	1
-	(Uruguay) Jesús Toscanini	1
-	(Puerto Rico) Héctor Ramos	1
-	(El Salvador) David Rugamas	1
-	(El Salvador) Dustin Corea	1
-	(El Salvador) Styven Vásquez	1
-	(Colombia) Jefferson Viveros	1
-	(Colombia) Luis Perea	1
-	(Colombia) Carlos Salazar	1
-	(Colombia) Duvier Riascos	1
-	(Paraguay) Javier Lezcano	1
-	(Paraguay) Gustavo Guerreño	1
-	(Paraguay) Diego Areco	1
-	(Panama) Armando Polo	1
-	(Colombia) Jhonathon Urrutia	1
-	(El Salvador) Emerson Mauricio	1
Totals		65
