= Primera División de Fútbol Profesional Clausura 2006 =

Primera División de Fútbol Profesional de El Salvador
- Champions: C.D. Aguila (14th title)
- Relegated: Atlético Balboa
- Top goalscorer: (El Salvador) TBD

The Primera División de Fútbol Profesional Clausura 2006 season (officially "Torneo Clausura 2006") started on January 14, 2006.

The season was composed of the following clubs:

- C.D. FAS
- C.D. Vista Hermosa
- San Salvador F.C.
- C.D. Águila
- C.D. Luis Ángel Firpo
- A.D. Isidro Metapán
- C.D. Atlético Balboa
- Alianza F.C.
- C.D. Chalatenango
- Once Municipal

== Team information ==
=== Personnel and sponsoring ===
Team	Chairman	Head coach	Kitmaker	Shirt sponsor
Águila	(El Salvador)	(Serbia and Montenegro) Vladan Vicevic	TBD	TBD
Alianza	(El Salvador)	(Brazil) Odir Jacques	TBD	TBD
Atletico Balboa	(El Salvador) Noel Benítez	(El Salvador) Nelson Mauricio Ancheta	TBD	TBD
C.D. Chalatenango	(El Salvador)	(Peru) Agustin Castillo		
FAS	(El Salvador) Reynaldo Valle	(Mexico) Carlos de los Cobos	TBD	TBD
Firpo	(El Salvador) TBD	(Serbia and Montenegro) Miloš Miljanić	TBD	TBD
Isidro Metapan	(El Salvador) José Gumercindo Landaverde	(Uruguay) Ruben Alonso	TBD	TBD
Once Municipal	(El Salvador) TBD	(Uruguay) Miguel Mansilla	TBD	TBD
San Salvador F.C.	(El Salvador) Marco Flores	(Argentina) Juan Quarterone	TBD	TBD
C.D. Vista Hermosa	(El Salvador) TBD	(El Salvador) Jose Mario Martinez	TBD	TBD

== Managerial changes ==
=== Before the season ===
Team	Outgoing manager	Manner of departure	Date of vacancy	Replaced by	Date of appointment	Position in table
Firpo	(El Salvador) Leonel Carcamo	TBD	December 2005	(Serbia and Montenegro) Milos Mijanic	January 2006	
Atletico Balboa	(Argentina) Jorge Garcia	TBD	December 2005	(El Salvador) Nelson Mauricio Ancheta	January 2006	
Alianza F.C.	(Chile) Oscar del Solar	TBD	December 2005	(Brazil) Odir Jacques	January 2006	

=== During the season ===
Team	Outgoing manager	Manner of departure	Date of vacancy	Replaced by	Date of appointment	Position in table
San Salvador F.C.	(Argentina) Juan Quarterone	TBD	February 2006	(El Salvador) Antonio Orellana Rico	February 2006	
San Salvador F.C.	(El Salvador) Antonio Orellana Rico	TBD	February 2006	(El Salvador) Leonel Carcamo	February 2006	
Alianza F.C.	(Brazil) Odir Jacques	TBD	February 2006	(El Salvador) Oscar Emigdio Benitez	March 2006	

== Clausura 2006 standings ==
Pos	Team	Pld	W	D	L	GF	GA	GD	Pts	Qualification or relegation
1	C.D. Águila	18	9	5	4	24	19	+5	32	
2	C.D. FAS	18	6	8	4	26	17	+9	26	
3	C.D. Vista Hermosa	18	8	2	8	27	22	+5	26	
4	A.D. Isidro Metapán	18	7	5	6	21	22	−1	26	
5	Alianza F.C.	18	7	4	7	29	26	+3	25	
6	C.D. Atlético Balboa	18	6	5	7	26	25	+1	23	Relegated to Segunda División de Fútbol Salvadoreño
7	San Salvador F.C.	18	6	5	7	28	32	−4	23	
8	C.D. Chalatenango	18	5	7	6	19	26	−7	22	
9	Once Municipal	18	5	6	7	24	30	−6	21	
10	C.D. Luis Ángel Firpo	18	5	5	8	18	23	−5	20	

== Semifinals 1st leg ==
May 6, 2006

A.D. Isidro Metapán	3-1	C.D. Águila

May 6, 2006

C.D. Vista Hermosa	0-0	C.D. FAS

== Semifinals 2nd leg ==
May 13, 2006

C.D. Águila	4-1	A.D. Isidro Metapán

May 13, 2006

C.D. FAS	1-0	C.D. Vista Hermosa

== Final ==
May 28, 2006

C.D. Águila	4-2	C.D. FAS
Juan Camilo Mejía 41'; Álex Erazo 68', 89' (pen.); Alexander Campos 87'		Lucas Abraham 70'; Emerson Umaña 79'

Aguila
GK	1	(El Salvador) Henry Hernández
DF	2	(El Salvador) Otoniel Carranza (yellow card) 66'
DF	24	(Honduras) Fabio Ulloa
DF	4	(El Salvador) Luis Anaya (yellow card) 16'
DF	23	(El Salvador) Ladislao Nerio
MF	18	(El Salvador) Juan Lazo Cruz	(substituted off) 65'
MF	20	(El Salvador) Eliseo Salamanca
MF	19	(Colombia) Camilo Mejía	(substituted off) 82'
MF	13	(El Salvador) Deris Umanzor
FW	16	(El Salvador) Álex Erazo (substituted off) 90'
FW	12	(El Salvador) Alexander Campos (yellow card) 95'
Substitutes:
FW	5	(El Salvador) Rolando Torres	(substituted on) 65'
MF	10	(Colombia) Francisco Serrano	(substituted on) 82'
MF	8	(El Salvador) Rudis Corrales	(substituted on) 90'
Manager:
(Serbia and Montenegro) Vladan Vicevic

FAS:
GK	25	(El Salvador) Santos Rivera
DF	5	(El Salvador) Víctor Velásquez
DF	3	(El Salvador) Marvin Gonzalez
DF	7	(El Salvador) Rafael Tobar	(substituted off) 62'
DF	4	(El Salvador) Ramon Flores
MF	6	(El Salvador) Carlos Menjívar
MF	16	(El Salvador) Jaime Gómez	(substituted off) 45'
MF	8	(El Salvador) Cristian Álvarez
MF	15	(El Salvador) Alfredo Pacheco
FW	23	(Paraguay) Néstor Ayala (yellow card) 44'
FW	13	(El Salvador) Juan Carlos Moscoso
Substitutes:
FW	9	(Argentina) Lucas Abraham	(substituted on) 45'
MF	22	(El Salvador) Emerson Umaña	(substituted on) 62'
Manager:
(Mexico) Carlos de los Cobos

Clausura Champions 2006

14th title

== List of foreign players in the league ==
This is a list of foreign players in Clausura 2006. The following players:

1. have played at least one apertura game for the respective club.
2. have not been capped for the El Salvador national football team on any level, independently from the birthplace

C.D. Águila

- (Honduras) Fabio Ulloa
- (Colombia) Juan Camilo Mejia
- (Colombia) Francisco Serrano
- (Colombia) Giribeth Cotes

Alianza F.C.

- (Argentina) Eduardo Escobar
- (Mexico) Jose Luis Osorio
- (Mexico) Arturo Albarrán
- (Gabon) Didier Ovono

Atletico Balboa

- (Honduras) Franklin Webster
- (Paraguay) Gabriel Garcete
- (Uruguay) Pablo Quinones
- (Honduras) Ernesto Noel Aquino

Chalatenango

- (Panama) Nicolás Muñoz
- (Colombia) Victor Mafla
- (Peru) César Charum
- (Peru) Germán Carty

C.D. FAS

- (Argentina) Lucas Abraham
- (Paraguay) Nestor Ayala
- (Jamaica) Wolde Harris
- (Argentina) Santiago Autino
- (Argentina) Martín Boasso

(player released mid season) Injury replacement player

C.D. Luis Ángel Firpo

- (Colombia) Alexander Obregón
- (Brazil) Mauro Caju
- (Colombia) Nilson Pérez
- (Colombia) Pablo Vacca
- (Brazil) José Laurindo

A.D. Isidro Metapán

- (Uruguay) Paolo Suarez
- (Uruguay) Alcides Bandera
- (Honduras) Williams Reyes
- (Honduras) Marlon Godoy

Once Municipal

- (Ghana) James Owusu
- (Colombia) Libardo Barbajal
- (Nigeria) Austin Nwoko (Austin Knoko)
- (Argentina) Matias Milozzi

San Salvador F.C.

- (Brazil) Paulo Cesar Rodriguez
- (Colombia) Hermes Martínez Misal
- (Costa Rica) Evance Benwell
- (Argentina) Rodrigo Lagos
- (Brazil) Fabio de Azevedo

Vista Hermosa

- (Argentina) Patricio Barroche
- (Colombia) Elder Figueroa
- (Colombia) Luis Torres Rodriguez
