= Primera División de Fútbol Profesional Apertura 2006 =

Primera División de Fútbol Profesional de El Salvador
- Champions: Once Municipal (2nd title)
- Relegated: None
- Top goalscorer: (El Salvador) TBD

The Primera División de Fútbol Profesional Apertura 2006 season (officially "Torneo Apertura 2006") started on August 12, 2006 and concluded on December 17.

== Apertura 2006 teams ==
Club	City	Stadium
C.D. Águila	San Miguel	Estadio Juan Francisco Barraza
Alianza F.C.	San Salvador	Estadio Cuscatlán
C.D. Chalatenango	Chalatenango	Estadio José Gregorio Martínez
C.D. FAS	Santa Ana	Estadio Oscar Quiteño
C.D. L.A. Firpo	Usulután	Estadio Sergio Torres
Independiente Nacional 1906	San Vicente	Estadio Jiboa
A.D. Isidro Metapán	Metapán	Estadio Jorge Calero Suárez
Once Municipal	Ahuachapán	Estadio Simeón Magaña
San Salvador F.C.	San Salvador	Estadio Cuscatlán
C.D. Vista Hermosa	San Francisco Gotera	Estadio Luis Amílcar Moreno

== Team information ==
=== Personnel and sponsoring ===
Team	Chairman	Head coach	Kitmaker	Shirt sponsor
Águila	(El Salvador)	(Serbia) Vladan Vicevic	TBD	TBD
Alianza	(El Salvador)	(Uruguay) Miguel Mansilla	TBD	TBD
C.D. Chalatenango	(El Salvador)	(Peru) Agustin Castillo		
FAS	(El Salvador) Reynaldo Valle	(Argentina) Julio Asad	TBD	TBD
Firpo	(El Salvador) TBD	(El Salvador) Leonel Carcamo	TBD	TBD
Independiente Nacional 1906	(El Salvador)	(El Salvador) Juan Ramon Paredes	TBD	TBD
Isidro Metapan	(El Salvador) José Gumercindo Landaverde	(Uruguay) Ruben Alonso	TBD	TBD
Once Municipal	(El Salvador) TBD	(El Salvador) Nelson Mauricio Ancheta	TBD	TBD
San Salvador F.C.	(El Salvador) Marco Flores	(Argentina) Hugo Coria	TBD	TBD
C.D. Vista Hermosa	(El Salvador) TBD	(El Salvador) Jose Mario Martinez	TBD	TBD

== Managerial changes ==
=== Before the season ===
Team	Outgoing manager	Manner of departure	Date of vacancy	Replaced by	Date of appointment	Position in table
FAS	(Mexico) Carlos de los Cobos	TBD	June 2006	(Argentina) Julio Asad	June 2006	
San Salvador F.C.	(El Salvador) Leonel Carcamo	TBD	June 2006	(Argentina) Hugo Coria	June 2006	
Firpo	(Serbia) Milos Mijanic	TBD	June 2006	(El Salvador) Leonel Carcamo	June 2006	
Alianza F.C.	(El Salvador) Oscar Emigdio Benitez	TBD	June 2006	(Uruguay) Miguel Mansilla	June 2006	
Once Municipal	(Uruguay) Miguel Mansilla	TBD	June 2006	(El Salvador) Nelson Mauricio Ancheta	June 2006	

=== During the season ===
Team	Outgoing manager	Manner of departure	Date of vacancy	Replaced by	Date of appointment	Position in table
Independiente Nacional 1906	(El Salvador) Juan Ramon Paredes	TBD	October 2006	(Argentina) Juan Quarterone	October 2006	
Metapan	(Uruguay) Ruben Alonso	TBD	October 2006	(El Salvador) Edwin Portillo	October 2006	
Alianza F.C.	(Uruguay) Miguel Mansilla	TBD	October 2006	(Paraguay) Nelson Brizuela	October 2006	

== Apertura 2006 standings ==
Pos	Team	Pld	W	D	L	GF	GA	GD	Pts	Qualification
1	C.D. FAS	18	8	7	3	32	24	+8	31	Semifinal Berth
2	Once Municipal	18	7	8	3	17	12	+5	29	Semifinal Berth
3	C.D. Águila	18	8	3	7	35	22	+13	27	Semifinal Berth
4	C.D. Luis Ángel Firpo	18	6	8	4	25	21	+4	26	4th Place Playoff Game
5	Alianza F.C.	18	8	2	8	22	22	0	26	4th Place Playoff Game
6	San Salvador F.C.	18	7	3	8	23	25	−2	24	
7	C.D. Chalatenango	18	6	5	7	17	20	−3	23	
8	C.D. Vista Hermosa	18	5	7	6	24	26	−2	22	
9	A.D. Isidro Metapán	18	6	4	8	22	26	−4	22	
10	Independiente Nacional 1906	18	4	3	11	13	32	−19	15	

== 4th place playoff ==
The fourth place match was played on November 30. The winner advances to the semifinals.

November 30, 2006

Alianza F.C.	3-1	C.D. Luis Ángel Firpo

15:00 - Estadio Cuscatlán, San Salvador

== Bracket ==
Semifinals (agg)
Alianza F.C.	2
C.D. FAS	4
C.D. Águila	5
Once Municipal (a)	5

Final
C.D. FAS	1
Once Municipal	3

== Semifinals ==
The team with the lower league position played home in the 1st leg. The 1st legs were played on December 2 and December 3. The 2nd legs were played on December 9 and December 10.

=== 1st leg ===
December 2, 2006

C.D. Águila	4-1	Once Municipal

19:00 - Estadio Juan Francisco Barraza, San Miguel

December 3, 2006

Alianza F.C.	2-1	C.D. FAS
Aparicio 78'; Rodríguez 88'		Ayala 74'

15:00 - Estadio Cuscatlán, San Salvador

=== 2nd leg ===
December 9, 2006

Once Municipal	4-1	C.D. Águila

19:00 - Estadio Juan Francisco Barraza, San Miguel

December 10, 2006

C.D. FAS	3-0	Alianza F.C.

15:00 - Estadio Cuscatlán, San Salvador

== Final ==
The final game was played on December 17.

December 17, 2006

Once Municipal	3-1	C.D. FAS

Once Municipal
GK	22	(El Salvador) Adolfo Menéndez
DF	14	(Colombia) Libardo Carbajal
DF	20	(El Salvador) Mario Elias Guevara
DF	3	(Honduras) Ernesto Noel Aquino (yellow card) 58'
DF	12	(El Salvador) Aníbal Ávalos	(substituted off) 99'
MF	17	(El Salvador) Oscar Jiménez
MF	23	(El Salvador) Nelson Nerio (yellow card) 74'	(substituted off) 75'
MF	11	(El Salvador) Mario Pablo Quintanilla
MF	10	(El Salvador) William Antonio Torres
FW	8	(El Salvador) Christian Javier Bautista (yellow card) 9'	(substituted off) 61'
FW	7	(Uruguay) Juan Carlos Reyes
Substitutes:
FW	21	(El Salvador) Ovidio Guzmán (yellow card) 91'	(substituted on) 61'
MF	5	(El Salvador)	(substituted on) 75'
MF	9	(Ghana) James Owusu-Ansah	(substituted on) 99'
Manager:
(El Salvador) Nelson Mauricio Ancheta

FAS:
GK	1	(El Salvador) Santos Rivera
DF	4	(El Salvador) Ramon Flores	(substituted off) 88'
DF	3	(El Salvador) Marvin Gonzalez (yellow card) 95' (red card) 110'
DF	7	(El Salvador) Rafael Tobar
DF	15	(El Salvador) Alfredo Pacheco
MF	6	(El Salvador) Carlos Menjívar	(substituted off) 94'
MF	18	(El Salvador) Gilberto Murgas (yellow card) 23'
MF	8	(El Salvador) Cristian Álvarez
MF	13	(El Salvador) Juan Carlos Moscoso (yellow card) 35'	(substituted off) 46'
FW	23	(Paraguay) Néstor Ayala (yellow card) 32'
FW	17	(El Salvador) Alejandro Bentos
Substitutes:
MF	22	(El Salvador) Emerson Umaña	(substituted on) 46'
FW	28	(El Salvador) César Larios	(substituted on) 88'
DF	14	(El Salvador) Victor Fuentes	(substituted on) 94'
Manager:
(Argentina) Julio Asad

Apertura Champions 2006/07

2nd title

== List of foreign players in the league ==
This is a list of foreign players in Apertura 2006. The following players:

1. have played at least one apertura game for the respective club.
2. have not been capped for the El Salvador national football team on any level, independently from the birthplace

A new rule was introduced this season that clubs can only have three foreign players per club and can only add a new player if there is an injury or player/s is released.

C.D. Águila

- (Argentina) Carlos Verdugo
- (Colombia) Juan Camilo Mejia
- (Colombia) Francisco Serrano
- (Argentina) Omar Axel Clazon

Alianza F.C.

- (Chile) Juan José Ossandón
- (Chile) Juan Carlos Madrid
- (Chile) Jhon Novoa
- (Mexico) Arturo Albarrán

Chalatenango

- (Honduras) Franklin Webster
- (Brazil) Marcelo Messias
- (Brazil) Marcelo Domínguez
- (Brazil) Paulo De Oliveira

C.D. FAS

- (Argentina) Alejandro Bentos
- (Paraguay) Nestor Ayala
- (Uruguay) Paolo Suarez

C.D. Luis Ángel Firpo

- (Colombia) Hermes Martinez
- (Argentina) Leonardo Pekarnik
- (Costa Rica) David Diah
- (Uruguay) Pablo Tiscornia

(player released mid season) Injury replacement player

Independiente Nacional 1906

- (Colombia) Alexander Obregón
- (Colombia) Miguel Solis
- (Honduras) Hugo Sariemento

A.D. Isidro Metapán

- (Argentina) Rodrigo Lagos
- (Honduras) William Reyes
- (Paraguay) Jorge Esteban Ortíz

Once Municipal

- (Ghana) James Owusu-Ansah
- (Honduras) Ernesto Noel Aquino
- (Honduras) Libardo Barbajal
- (Uruguay) Juan Carlos Reyes

San Salvador F.C.

- (Brazil) Paulo Cesar Rodriguez
- (Costa Rica) Evance Bennett
- (Colombia) Francisco Rivera
- (Colombia) Julian Barragan

Vista Hermosa

- (Argentina) Patricio Barroche
- (Colombia) Elder Figueroa
- (Colombia) Luis Torres Rodriguez
- (Colombia) Cristian Mosquera
