= 2006 Copa Presidente =

2006 Copa El Salvador
Tournament details
- Country: El Salvador
- Teams: 36

Final positions
- Champions: Once Municipal
- Runners-up: Aguila

The Copa Presidente 2006 is the Third staging of the Copa El Salvador football tournament.

== Participants ==
10 Primera División teams, 12 Liga de Ascenso teams , 14 teams from the Tercera División.

Club	League	Stadium	Capacity
AD Municipal	Liga de Ascenso	TBD	N/A
Aguila	Primera División	TBD	N/A
Alianza	Primera División	TBD	N/A
Arcense	Liga de Ascenso	TBD	N/A
Atletico Balboa	Primera División	TBD	N/A
Chalatenango	Primera División	TBD	N/A
Curazao	Liga de Ascenso	TBD	N/A
Chaparratique	Liga de Ascenso	TBD	N/A
Dragon	Tercera División	TBD	N/A
FAS	Primera División	TBD	N/A
Fuerte Aguilares	Tercera División	TBD	N/A
Fuerte San Francisco	Liga de Ascenso	TBD	N/A
Independiente Nacional 1906	Primera División	TBD	N/A
Isidro Metapan	Primera División	TBD	N/A
Juventud Independiente	Liga de Ascenso	TBD	N/A
LA Firpo	Primera División	TBD	N/A
Limeno	Liga de Ascenso	TBD	N/A
Municipal ADESSE	Tercera División	TBD	N/A
Nueva Concepción	Tercera División	TBD	N/A
Once Municipal	Primera División	TBD	N/A
Pasaquina	Tercera División	TBD	N/A
Real Zaragoza	Tercera División	TBD	N/A
San Pablo Tacachico	Tercera División	TBD	N/A
San Rafael Maracaná	Tercera División	TBD	N/A
San Salvador F.C.	Primera División	TBD	N/A
Santiagueno	Tercera División	TBD	N/A
Tehuacan	Tercera División	TBD	N/A
Titan	Tercera División	TBD	N/A
Topiltzin	Liga de Ascenso	TBD	N/A
UDET	Tercera División	TBD	N/A
Vendaval	Tercera División	TBD	N/A
Vista Hermosa	Primera División	TBD	N/A

== Round 1 ==
=== Zona Centro-Occidente ===
Those in Bold Progressed to the next round

2006	Chalatenango	3-1	Nueva Concepción
	TBD; TBD		TBD

2006	San Salvador F.C.	3-1	Fuerte Aguilares
	TBD; TBD		TBD

2006	Alianza F.C.	1–2	Juventud Independiente
	TBD		TBD; TBD

2006	San Pablo Municipal	0-1	Vendaval
	Nil		TBD

2006	FAS	0–0 (pen 2-4)	Arcense
	Nil		Nil

2006	Titan	2-3	Isidro Metapan
	TBD; TBD		TBD; TBD

2006	Once Municipal	6-3	AD Municipal
	TBD; TBD; TBD; TBD		TBD; TBD

2006	Curazao	5–0	Real Zaragoza
	TBD; TBD; TBD; TBD		Nil

=== Zona Centro-Oriente ===
Those in Bold Progressed to the next round

2006	Independiente Nacional 1906	3-2	Municipal ADESSE
	TBD; TBD		TBD; TBD

2006	Topiltzin	3-1	Tehuacan
	TBD; TBD		TBD

2006	Santiagueno	0-5	Atletico Balboa
	Nil		TBD; TBD

2006	LA Firpo	5-0	San Rafael Maracaná
	TBD; TBD		Nil

2006	Atletico Chaparratique	4–0	UDET
	TBD; TBD; TBD		Nil

2006	Dragon	1–0	Fuerte San Francisco
	TBD		Nil

2006	Pasaquina	1–5	Aguila
	TBD		TBD; TBD

2006	Limeno	2-2 (Pen 5-4)	Vista Hermosa
	TBD; TBD		TBD; TBD

== Round of 16 ==
=== First Leg ===
September 20, 2006	Juventud Independiente	2-1	Vendaval
	TBD; TBD		TBD

September 20, 2006	Chalatenango	DNP	San Salvador
	Nil		Nil

September 20, 2006	Arcense	1-2	Isidro Metapan
	TBD		TBD; TBD

September 20, 2006	Curazao	DNP	Once Municipal
	TBD; TBD		TBD; TBD

September 20, 2006	Municipal Limeno	1-3	Aguila
	TBD		TBD; TBD; TBD

September 20, 2006	Dragon	1-2	Atlético Chaparratique
	TBD		TBD; TBD

September 20, 2006	Atletico Balboa	0-1	LA Firpo
	Nil		TBD

September 20, 2006	Topiltzin	1-2	Independiente Nacional 1906
	TBD		TBD; TBD

=== Second Leg ===
September 27, 2006	Vendaval	0-2	Juventud Independiente
	Nil		TBD; TBD

Juventud Independiente won on 4-1 aggregate

September 27, 2006	San Salvador	2-2	Chalatenango
	TBD; TBD		TBD; TBD

2-2. San Salvador won 5-3 on penalties

September 27, 2006	Isidro Metapan	2-1	Arcense
	TBD; TBD		TBD

Isidro Metapan won 4-2 on aggregate

September 27, 2006	Once Municipal	3-0	Curazao
	TBD; TBD; TBD		Nil

TBD won on aggregate

September 27, 2006	Aguila	5-0	Municipal Limeno
	TBD; TBD; TBD; TBD; TBD		Nil

Aguila won on 8-1 aggregate

September 27, 2006	Atlético Chaparratique	1-2	Dragon
	TBD		TBD; TBD

3-3. Dragon won as being ranked on a lower division

September 27, 2006	LA Firpo	2-0	Atletico Balboa
	TBD; TBD		Nil

LA Firpo won 3-0 on aggregate

September 27, 2006	Independiente Nacional 1906	5-1	Topiltzin
	TBD; TBD; TBD; TBD; TBD		TBD

Independiente Nacional 1906 won 7-2 on aggregate

== Quarter Final ==
=== First Leg ===
October 4, 2006	Aguila	6-1	Dragon
	TBD; TBD; TBD; TBD; TBD; TBD		TBD

October 8, 2006	Isidro Metapan	2-0	Once Municipal
	TBD; TBD		Nil

October 8, 2006	Independiente Nacional 1906	0-1	LA Firpo
	Nil		TBD; TBD

October 11, 2006	Juventud Independiente	1-1	San Salvador
	TBD		TBD

=== Second Leg ===
November 1, 2006	San Salvador	3-3	Juventud Independiente
	TBD; TBD; TBD		TBD; TBD; TBD

4-4. Juventud Independiente progressed on away goals

November 1, 2006	Once Municipal	4-1	Isidro Metapan
	TBD; TBD; TBD; TBD		TBD

Once Municipal won 4-3 on aggregate

November 1, 2006	Dragon	0-2	Aguila
	Nil		TBD; TBD

Aguila won 8-1 on aggregate

November 2, 2006	LA Firpo	3-0	Independiente Nacional 1906
	TBD; TBD; TBD		Nil

LA Firpo won 4-0 on aggregate

== Semi Final ==
2006	Once Municipal	3-2	Juventud Independiente
	TBD; TBD; TBD		TBD; TBD

TBD Progressed to the final

2006	Aguila	0-0 (Pen 4-2)	LA Firpo
	Nil		Nil

Aguila Progressed to the final'

== Final ==
22 November 2006
7:30 pm

Once Municipal	1-0	Aguila
Mario Deras 75'		Nil

Estadio Cuscatlán, San Salvador
