= Ronald Pimentel =

Salvadoran footballer (born 1985)

Personal information
- Full name: Ronald Alexander Pimentel
- Date of birth: September 17, 1985 (age 41)
- Place of birth: Sonsonate, El Salvador
- Height: 1.70 m (5 ft 7 in)
- Position: Midfielder

Youth career
- 2000–2003: Once Municipal

Senior career*
Years	Team	Apps	(Gls)
2003–2007	Once Municipal		
2007–2008	Chalatenango	24	(0)
2008–2009	Alianza	28	(1)
2010	Luis Ángel Firpo	15	(0)
2010–2013	Once Municipal	69	(4)
2013–2015	Juventud Independiente	22	(0)
2015–2016	Chalatenango		
2016–2017	Atlético Comalapa		
2017–2018	Audaz	2	(0)

International career
- El Salvador U21
2006	El Salvador	1	(0)
- * Club domestic league appearances and goals

Ronald Alexander Pimentel (born September 17, 1985) is a Salvadoran former professional footballer who played as a midfielder.

== Club career ==
Pimentel started his career at Salvadoran Second Division side Once Municipal in 2000, clinching promotion with them to the top tier and winning the Apertura 2006 tournament.

In 2007, he left them for Chalatenango, only to join Alianza a year later. After a year at Luis Ángel Firpo in 2010, he rejoined Once Municipal for the Clausura 2011 season.

== International career ==
Pimentel made his debut for El Salvador in a November 2006 friendly match against Panama. He has not played any international matches since.
