= José Manuel González (footballer) =

Salvadoran footballer (born 1981)

Personal information
- Full name: José Manuel González Hernández
- Date of birth: October 6, 1981 (age 45)
- Place of birth: San Miguel, El Salvador
- Height: 1.75 m (5 ft 9 in)
- Position: Goalkeeper

Senior career*
Years	Team	Apps	(Gls)
2001–2003	Dragon	30	(5)
2003–2004	Isidro Metapan	4	(0)
2004–2005	Dragon		
2005–2008	Vista Hermosa		(5 )
2008–2009	FAS	12	(0)
2010–2011	Vista Hermosa		(0)
2012	UES	15	(0)
2012	Aguila	3	(0)
2013–2016	Dragon	105	(4)
2016	Luis Ángel Firpo	11	(2)
2017–2018	Dragon	53	(0)
2018–2020	Municipal Limeño	31	(0)
2020	Jocoro	29	(0)
2021-2022	Platense	46	(0)
2023	Luis Ángel Firpo	4	(0)
2024	Cacahuatique		(0)

International career
2007	El Salvador	3	(0)

Managerial career
- 2024-2025: Dragon (Goalkeeping Coach)
- 2025: Dragon (Interim Coach)
- 2025-Present: Cacahuatique (Goalkeeping Coach)
- * Club domestic league appearances and goals

José Manuel González Hernández (born October 6, 1981 in San Miguel, El Salvador) is a retired Salvadoran professional football player, who played as a goalkeeper and is currently the Goalkeeping coach for Cacahuatique.

== Club career ==
=== Dragón ===
Nicknamed El Meme, González started his career at his hometown club Dragón with whom he played in the Segunda División as well as at the Primera División.

=== Vista Hermosa ===
After 9 years he moved on to Vista Hermosa, and in 2008 he signed for FAS, only to return to Vista Hermosa after one season.

With the team of San Francisco Gotera, González Hernández won the Apertura 2005 against Isidro Metapán (2–0 victory).

In December 2010, he extended his contract with Vista Hermosa after being linked to UES and was voted best goalkeeper of the national league, together with Juan José Gómez.

=== UES ===
After leaving Vista Hermosa because of the economic situation of the team in 2012 González signed with UES. Months later González signed with Águila.

=== Return to Dragón ===
In 2013, he returned to play with Dragón, being an important piece and reaching the final of the Clausura 2014 with the team of San Miguel but losing it against Isidro Metapán in the penalties with González in the goal. However, Dragón reached the final of the Clausura 2016 tournament and defeated Águila 1–0 with González again in the goal.

Months later, in a surprising way, Dragón was in danger of descending for the Clausura 2017 tournament, but getting saved in the last game of the season against Águila.

=== Luis Ángel Firpo ===
After that González left the team and signed with Luis Ángel Firpo in 2017. Months later returned to Dragón, but the team ended descending in the Clausura 2018 in the middle of an administrative and economic crisis.

=== Municipal Limeño ===
Gonzaléz signed with Municipal Limeño in the Apertura 2018 tournament. With Municipal Limeño, González reached the quarter-finals of the Apertura 2018 but they were eliminated by Santa Tecla 2–3 on aggregate.

== International career ==
Gónzález made his debut for El Salvador in a January 2007 friendly match against Denmark and has earned a total of 3 caps, scoring no goals. He has represented his country at the 2007 UNCAF Nations Cup where he played his final international match against Guatemala.
