= Salvador Coreas =

Salvador Coreas may refer to:

- Salvador Coreas (footballer, born 1960), Salvadoran football winger and manager
- Salvador Coreas (footballer, born 1984), Salvadoran football forward
