= José Campos (footballer) =

Salvadoran footballer (born 1983)

Personal information
- Full name: José Eduardo Campos Barahona
- Date of birth: March 15, 1983 (age 43)
- Place of birth: Usulután, El Salvador
- Height: 1.75 m (5 ft 9 in)
- Position: Midfielder

Team information
- Current team: Luis Ángel Firpo
- Number: 15

Youth career
- Santa Clara
- Topiltzín

Senior career*
| Years | Team | Apps | (Gls) |
| 2000–2004 | Luis Ángel Firpo | | |
| 2004–2006 | Vista Hermosa | | |
| 2006–2011 | Luis Ángel Firpo | | |
| 2011 | Vista Hermosa | 0 | (0) |
| 2012– | Luis Ángel Firpo | | |

International career^{‡}
| 2007 | El Salvador | 2 | (0) |
- * Club domestic league appearances and goals as of 20 July 2011 ‡ National team caps and goals as of 20 July 2011

José Eduardo Campos Barahona (born March 15, 1983, in Usulután, El Salvador) is a Salvadoran footballer who currently plays as a midfielder for Luis Ángel Firpo in the Primera División de Fútbol de El Salvador.

== Club career ==
Campos started his career in the youth section at Santa Clara and after a spell at Topiltzín, he joined Luis Ángel Firpo in 2000. He joined Vista Hermosa in 2005 only to return to Firpo a year later.

== International career ==
Campos made his debut for El Salvador in an August 2007 friendly match against Honduras, coming on as a second-half substitute for one of the goalscorers of the match, Victor Merino. The score stood in a victory for the Cuscatlecos by 2–0, although Campos was yellow-carded. His second and last international cap was in a September 2007 friendly match against Ecuador, where he came in as a second-half substitute for Julio Enrique Martínez. At the 62nd minute of the Ecuador game José Eduardo Campos swept forcefully on an Ecuadorian player and Peruan referee red-carded Campos; the second of the match for the Salvaoran team. The match was won by Ecuador by a score of 5–1.
