= Estadio Luis Amílcar Moreno =

Multi-use stadium in San Francisco Gotera, El Salvador

Estadio Municipal Luis Amilcar Moreno
- El Desierto de Oriente
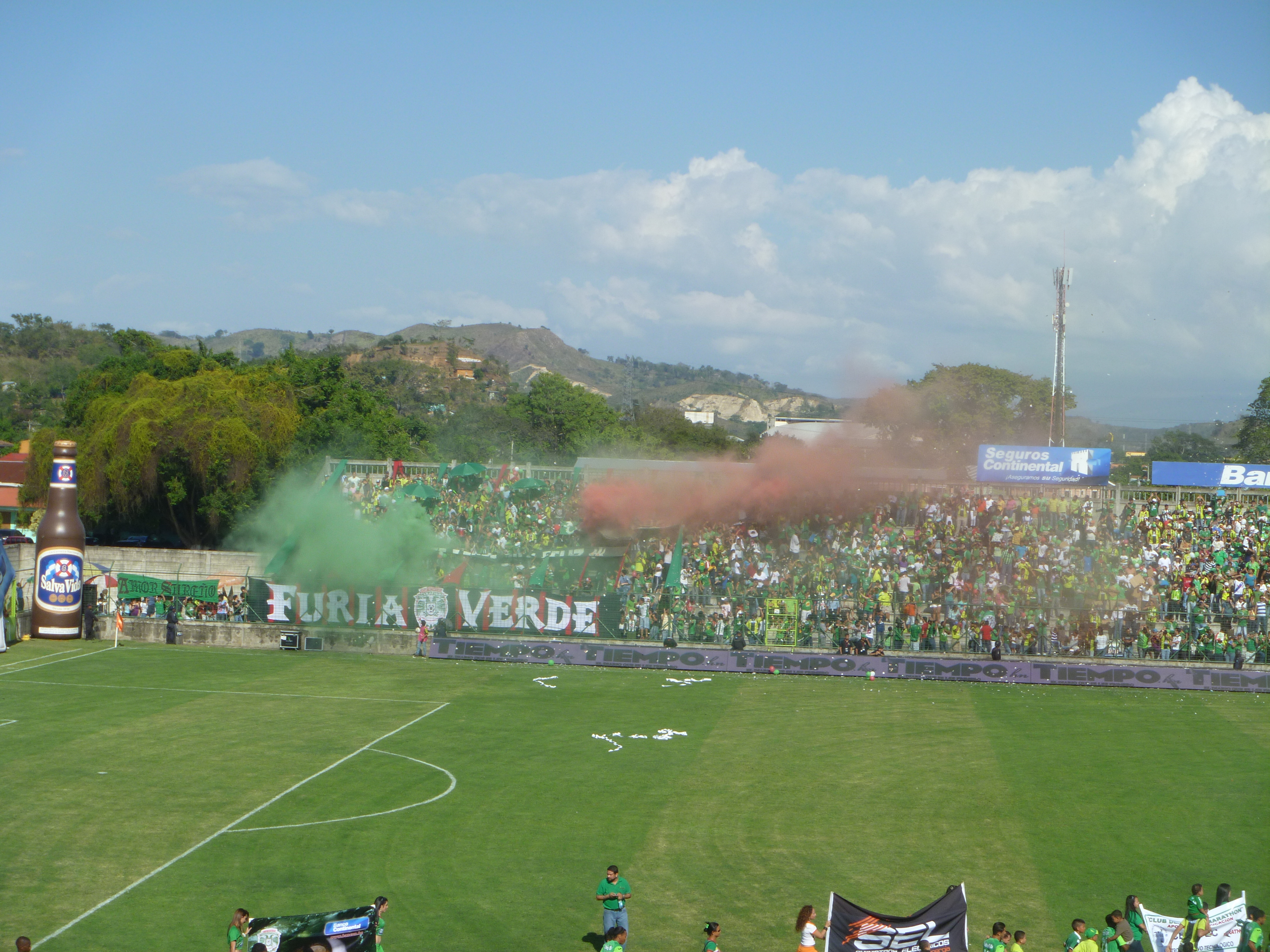
- Interactive map of Estadio Municipal Luis Amilcar Moreno
- Location: Morazán, San Francisco Gotera, El Salvador
- Coordinates: 13.7°N 88.1°W
- Operator: Municipalidad de San Francisco Gotera
- Capacity: 5,000

Construction
- Groundbreaking: October 20, 1998
- Opened: November 10, 2016
- Cost: US $185 million
- Architect: Construtora Benitez S.V

Tenants
- Fuerte San Francisco; Chagüite (previously); Vista Hermosa (previously)

Estadio Luis Amílcar Moreno is a multi-use stadium in San Francisco Gotera, El Salvador. It is currently the home for Fuerte San Francisco, used mostly for football matches and was the home stadium of C.D. Vista Hermosa. It has a total surface area of sixteen thousand seventy-four point forty-eight square meters. The stadium currently holds 4,000 people.

In May 2025, it was announced that the stadium would be remolded, with new field, updated bathrooms, seating stands and players change rooms. Total cost will be 200,000 USD; 80,000 USD would be donated by the Morazon Council and the rest being paid by Fuerte San Francisco.
