= Miguel Solís (footballer) =

Colombian/Salvadoran footballer (born 1980)

Personal information
- Full name: Miguel Solís Estupiñan
- Date of birth: February 21, 1980 (age 46)
- Place of birth: Cali, Colombia
- Height: 1.86 m (6 ft 1 in)
- Position: Defender

Senior career*
Years	Team	Apps	(Gls)
1998–2000	Deportivo Cali		
2001–2002	Cortuluá		
2002–2005	Once Municipal		
2005–2007	Independiente Nacional		
2007	Once Lobos		
2007–2012	Once Municipal		
2012–2015	UES		
2015–2016	Chalatenango		
2016	Pasaquina		
2016–2017	Once Municipal		
- * Club domestic league appearances and goals

Miguel Solís Estupiñan (born February 21, 1980) is a Colombian and naturalized Salvadoran former professional footballer who played as a defender.
