= Yovani Romero =

Salvadoran footballer (born 1980)

Personal information
- Full name: Yovani Humberto Romero Guevara
- Date of birth: April 11, 1980 (age 46)
- Place of birth: Santa Rosa de Lima, El Salvador
- Height: 1.80 m (5 ft 11 in)
- Position: Midfielder

Team information
- Current team: Vista Hermosa
- Number: 5

Senior career*
Years	Team	Apps	(Gls)
1996–1997	Liberal		
2000–2004	Atlético Chaparratique		
2004–2006	Vista Hermosa	39	(5)
2007–2010	Vista Hermosa	59	(3)
2012–	Vista Hermosa		

International career
2005	El Salvador	1	(0)
- * Club domestic league appearances and goals

Yovani Humberto Romero Guevara (born April 11, 1980, in Santa Rosa de Lima, El Salvador) is a Salvadoran footballer who currently plays for Vista Hermosa in the Primera División de Fútbol de El Salvador.

== Club career ==
Nicknamed el Largo (the tall one), Romero started his career at Segunda División de El Salvador club Liberal and played for Atlético Chaparratique before joining Vista Hermosa in 2004. In May 2006 he stayed behind in the United States after an apparent injury but did not return in time so Vista Hermosa decided to offload him.

After a season without a club he again returned to Vista Hermosa for the 2012 Clausura.

== International career ==
Romero made his debut for El Salvador in an August 2005 friendly match against Paraguay, coming on as a substitute for Deris Umanzor. The game proved to be his sole international match.
