= Juan Carlos Carreño =

Chilean footballer (born 1960)

Personal information
- Date of birth: 1 July 1960 (age 66)
- Place of birth: Santiago, Chile
- Position: Centre-back

Youth career
- Unión Española
- 1977: FAMAE

Senior career*
Years	Team	Apps	(Gls)
1978–1984	Trasandino		
1985	Unión San Felipe	20	(0)
1986–1992	Águila		
1993	Alianza		

Managerial career
- 1999: Alianza reserve (assistant)
- 2004: Atlético Marte
- 2008: Vendaval
- Independiente FC
- 2016–2017: Atlético Marte
- Tehuacán
- * Club domestic league appearances and goals

Juan Carlos Carreño (born 1 July 1960) is a Chilean football manager and former footballer who played as a centre-back for clubs in Chile and El Salvador.

== Playing career ==
Born in Santiago, Chile, as a youth player, Carreño was with Unión Española and the team of FAMAE (1977) in the Liga Capitalina of Santiago. As a professional footballer, Carreño played for both Trasandino (1978–84) and Unión San Felipe (1985) in Chile.

A historical player of Trasandino, he came to the club in 1978 and was the team captain in the 1982 season, where the team got promotion to the top division.

Then he moved to El Salvador in 1986, where he played for Águila and Alianza. As a member of Águila, he won the league title in 1987–88.

== Coaching career ==
Carreño has developed his entire career in El Salvador, coaching clubs such as Vendaval, Independiente FC, Atlético Marte, and Tehuacán.

He also has worked as a coach of youth players in the Academia Futuro and served as director of Salvadoran Football Managers Association (AEFES).

== Personal life ==
As a player of Trasandino, he was nicknamed Cañoncito (Little Cannon), due to his strong shoots.

== Honours ==
=== As player ===
Águila

- Salvadoran Primera División: 1987–88
