= Jhon Novoa =

Chilean footballer

Personal information
- Full name: Jhon Antonio Novoa Pino
- Date of birth: 27 December 1987 (age 38)
- Place of birth: Calama, Chile
- Position: Midfielder

Senior career*
Years	Team	Apps	(Gls)
2004–2006	Cobreloa		
2006	Alianza		
2007–2008	Cobreloa		
2009–2011	Unión Temuco		
2012	Fernández Vial		
- * Club domestic league appearances and goals

Jhon Antonio Novoa Pino (born 27 December 1987), frequently referred as John Novoa, is a Chilean former footballer who played as a midfielder.

== Career ==
A playmaker from the Cobreloa youth system, in August 2006 he moved abroad and joined Salvadoran club Alianza for the Apertura 2006. The next year, he returned to Cobreloa.

In 2009, he took part of the Unión Temuco squad what won the league title of the Tercera A and got promotion to the Primera B.

After a stint as a free agent, he played for Fernández Vial in the Segunda División Profesional.

== Personal life ==
Following his retirement, he attended the Gabriela Mistral University and got a degree in business administration.

== Honours ==
Unión Temuco

- Tercera A: 2009
