= C.D. Buenos Aires =

Association football club in El Salvador

- Full name: Club Deportivo Buenos Aires
- Founded: 1970
- Ground: Estadio Municipal de Osicala; Osicala, Morazán, El Salvador
- Manager: (El Salvador) William Chevez
- League: Tercera Division
- Clausura 2024: Grupo Centro Oriente A, 1th
Home colours	Away colours

Club Deportivo Buenos Aires is a Salvadoran professional football club based in Osicala, Morazán, El Salvador.

The club currently plays in the Tercera Division de Fútbol Salvadoreño after purchasing a spot.

== Honours ==
=== Domestic honours ===
==== Leagues ====
- Tercera División de Fútbol Salvadoreño and predecessors
  - Champions (2) : N/A
  - Play-off winner (2):
- La Asociación Departamental de Fútbol Aficionado' and predecessors (4th tier)
  - Champions (1):
  - Play-off winner (2):

== Current squad ==
As of March 2024 Note: Flags indicate national team as defined under FIFA eligibility rules; some limited exceptions apply. Players may hold more than one non-FIFA nationality.

No.	Pos.	Nation	Player
1	GK	SLV	Tony Osorio
9		SLV	Miguel Franco
17		SLV	Alemán
6		SLV	Eulises Pereira
20		SLV	Erick Álvarez (captain)

No.	Pos.	Nation	Player
35		SLV	Nilson Ventura
5		SLV	Wilamn Méndez
31		SLV	Hecson Argueta
10		SLV	Luis Rodríguez
16		SLV	Mario Martínez
33		SLV	Eladio Pereira
11		SLV	Melvín Villafuerte

=== Players with dual citizenship ===
- (El Salvador) (United States) TBD

=== In ===
Note: Flags indicate national team as defined under FIFA eligibility rules; some limited exceptions apply. Players may hold more than one non-FIFA nationality.

No.	Pos.	Nation	Player
—		SLV	TBD (From TBD)
—		SLV	TBD (From TBD)
—		SLV	TBD (From TBD)
—		SLV	TBD (From TBD)

No.	Pos.	Nation	Player
—		SLV	TBD (From TBD)
—		SLV	TBD (From TBD)
—		SLV	TBD (From TBD)

=== Out ===
Note: Flags indicate national team as defined under FIFA eligibility rules; some limited exceptions apply. Players may hold more than one non-FIFA nationality.

No.	Pos.	Nation	Player
—		SLV	Franklin Vásquez (To Vista Hermosa)
—		SLV	William Hernández (To Vista Hermosa)
—		SLV	TBD (To TBD)
—		SLV	TBD (To TBD)

No.	Pos.	Nation	Player
—		SLV	TBD (To TBD)
—		SLV	TBD (To TBD)
—		SLV	TBD (To TBD)

== List of coaches ==
- (El Salvador)
- (El Salvador) Dagoberto Sosa (July 2023-December 2023)
- (El Salvador) William Chevez (December 2023-May 2024)
- (El Salvador) Víctor Coreas (May 2024-December 2024)
- (El Salvador) Omar Sevilla (December 2024-March 2025)
- (El Salvador) Dagoberto Sosa (March 2025- Present)
