= Juan Isolino Rosa =

Salvadoran composer (1914–2004)

Juan Isolino Rosa (May 6, 1914 in San Francisco Gotera, Morazán - April 13, 2004 in Santa Tecla), was a Salvadoran composer, music professor, and folklorist. He founded the Escuela Normal de Suchitoto and became the director of more than twenty institutions throughout El Salvador. He was honored by the government of El Salvador in 1976 at the National Gymnasium with the "Medalla de Oro" ("Gold Medal") and "Diploma de Honor" ("Diploma of Honor"). The composer of numerous waltzes and children's songs, one of his best known compositions is "Torola". He was involved with numerous music festivals in the country and was a promoter of Salvadoran culture.
