= Cristian Gil (footballer, born 1979) =

Colombian footballer

Personal information
- Full name: Cristian Ali Gil Mosquera
- Date of birth: 18 August 1979 (age 47)
- Place of birth: Cali, Colombia
- Height: 1.84 m (6 ft 0 in)
- Position: Forward

Youth career
- 1994: Dimerco Real Popayán Fútbol Club
- 1994–1995: Deportivo Cali

Senior career*
Years	Team	Apps	(Gls)
1995–1996	Deportivo Cali		
1997	Deportivo Pasto		
1998	Caracas FC		
1999	Atlético Torino		
1999	Deportivo Cali		
2000	Deportes Palmira		
2001	Deportivo Quito		
2002–2003	Pumas de Casanare		
2004–2005	La Equidad		
2005–2008	Vista Hermosa		
2008	San Salvador FC		
2008	Atlético Balboa		
2009–2010	Municipal Limeño		
2010	Deportivo Zacapa		
2011–2012	Municipal Limeño		
2012–2013	Atlético Marte		
2013–2014	UES		
2014–2015	Once Lobos		
2015	CD Topiltzín		
2016	Atlético Marte		
2016	Audaz		
2017	UES		
2017–2019	Brujos de Izalco		
- * Club domestic league appearances and goals

Cristian Ali Gil Mosquera (born 18 August 1979) is a Colombian former professional footballer who played as a forward.

== Career ==
In 2005, Mosquera signed with Vista Hermosa.

In June 2012, Mosquera signed with Atlético Marte.

In 2013, Mosquera signed with UES.

Mosquera signed again with Atlético Marte for the Clausura 2016.

In 2016, Mosquera signed with Audaz.

Mosquera signed again with UES for the Clausura 2017.

After left UES, Mosquera signed with Brujos de Izalco.

== Death of Álex Obregón ==
Gil suffered severe injuries to the skull and thorax in a car crash in 2009, on the road to and just outside La Libertad. Former teammate and friend, Colombian player Alexander Obregón died in the same accident. Gil's condition was stable but he remained in intensive care the following days.

== Honours ==
Vista Hermosa

- Primera División: Apertura 2005
