= Manfredi Portillo =

Salvadoran footballer (born 1985)

Personal information
- Full name: José Manfredi Portillo Hernández
- Date of birth: July 15, 1985 (age 41)
- Place of birth: Moncagua, El Salvador
- Height: 1.73 m (5 ft 8 in)
- Position: Midfielder

Senior career*
Years	Team	Apps	(Gls)
2001–2003	AGABE		
2003–2005	Atlético Chaparrastique		
2005–2010	Vista Hermosa	106	(9)
2010	Atlético Balboa		
2010–2012	Vista Hermosa		
2012	Juventud Independiente	8	(0)
2012–2013	Aspirante		
2013	Juventud Independiente	3	(0)
2014	Aspirante	0	(0)
2014–2015	Municipal Limeño		

International career
2005	El Salvador U20		
2006	El Salvador U21		
2007	El Salvador U23		
2007	El Salvador	1	(0)
- * Club domestic league appearances and goals

José Manfredi Portillo Hernández (born July 15, 1985) is a Salvadoran former footballer who played as a midfielder.

== Club career ==
Portillo was born in Moncagua. He started his career at Third Division side AGABE, and joined Salvadoran Second Division outfit Atlético Chaparrastique in 2003, only to join top level Vista Hermosa a year later.

He returned to Vista Hermosa for the 2011 Clausura tournament, after spending the 2010 Apertura with Atlético Balboa.

== International career ==
Portillo has been called up for the El Salvador U21 as well as the El Salvador U23 national team.
