= Héctor Ávalos =

Salvadoran footballer (born 1978)

Personal information
- Full name: Héctor Aníbal Ávalos Tobar
- Date of birth: April 9, 1978 (age 48)
- Place of birth: Ahuachapán, El Salvador
- Height: 1.68 m (5 ft 6 in)
- Position: Midfielder

Team information
- Current team: Once Municipal
- Number: 12

Youth career
- 1989–1990: Fuerte Fronterizo

Senior career*
Years	Team	Apps	(Gls)
1994–1999	Once Municipal		
1999–2000	Juventud Olímpica Metalío		
2000–2002	Alianza		
2002–2004	Arcense	4	(0)
2005–2008	Once Municipal	113	(9)
2008–2010	FAS	29	(2)
2010–	Once Municipal		

International career^{‡}
2006–2007	El Salvador	3	(0)
- * Club domestic league appearances and goals as of 9 January 2011 ‡ National team caps and goals as of 9 January 2011

Héctor Anibal Ávalos Tobar (born April 9, 1978 in El Salvador) is a Salvadoran footballer who currently plays for Once Municipal in the Primera División de Fútbol de El Salvador.

== Club career ==
Ávalos started his career in 1994 with hometown club Once Municipal in the Second division until leaving for Juventud Olimpia Metalio in 1999. He then made his debut in the Premier division with Alianza in 2000 and joined Arcense 2 years later. After a second spell at Once Municipal, he moved on to big club FAS only to return to Once Municipal again in 2010.

== International career ==
Ávalos made his debut for El Salvador in a November 2006 friendly match against Panama and has earned a total of 3 caps, scoring no goals. He has represented his country at the 2007 UNCAF Nations Cup.

His final international was the February 2007 UNCAF Cup match against Guatemala.
