= José Gilberto Montoya =

Colombian researcher

Dr. José Gilberto Montoya is a prominent researcher known for his contributions to the field of infectious diseases, particularly in the area of chronic fatigue syndrome (CFS) and the role of infectious agents in its development. His research has shed light on the potential involvement of pathogens and immune dysregulation in the pathophysiology of CFS. He was a Professor of Medicine in Infectious Disease at the Stanford University School of Medicine, where he led Stanford's Initiative on Chronic Fatigue Syndrome. He has worked on a wide variety of projects, including research focused on the efficacy of new smallpox vaccines. Additionally, he was the founder and co-director of the Immunocompromised Host Service and works at the Positive Care Clinic at Stanford. He is originally from Cali, Colombia.

== Education and career ==
Montoya received a medical degree with honors from University of Valle in Colombia.

He completed his residency in Internal Medicine at Tulane University. Montoya then completed his post-doctoral fellowship at Stanford University.

== Research and contributions ==
Montoya authored and co-authored more than 150 publications in peer-reviewed journals along with more than 30 book chapters. He specializes in toxoplasmosis and infectious diseases particularly as it pertains to cardiac transplants and AIDS patients. He also is a world renowned researcher in chronic fatigue syndrome.

Dr Montoya was one of the first researchers to identify biomarkers for chronic fatigue, finding variations in 17 immune-system signaling proteins, or cytokines, whose concentrations in the blood correlate with the disease's severity.

In one highly cited study by Dr. Montoya explored the potential therapeutic benefits of antiviral medications in treating CFS patients with evidence of HHV-6 infection. Published in the journal PLoS ONE in 2014, the study titled "Valganciclovir in the Treatment of Fatigue in Patients with Persisting Epstein-Barr Virus (EBV) Infection" investigated the use of an antiviral drug called valganciclovir and reported improvements in fatigue levels in some patients, suggesting a potential role of antiviral medications in managing CFS associated with EBV infection.

In addition to HHV-6 and Epstein-Barr virus (EBV), Dr. Montoya has also investigated other infectious agents associated with CFS. In a study published in the journal Frontiers in Pediatrics in 2019, titled "Cytokine Signature Associated with Disease Severity in Chronic Fatigue Syndrome Patients," Montoya and his colleagues analyzed cytokine levels in CFS patients and healthy controls. They found significant differences in cytokine profiles between the two groups, indicating immune dysregulation in CFS. Additionally, specific cytokine patterns were associated with disease severity, suggesting a potential biomarker for assessing CFS severity.

Montoya also co-authored a comprehensive guide to diagnosing and treating patients with ME/CFS.

== Awards ==
Montoya is the recipient of many awards for teaching excellence, including:

- The [David A. Rytand Teaching Award] for Excellence in Clinical Teaching., Department of Medicine, Stanford University School of Medicine (1998, 2001)
- The Arthur L. Bloomfield Award for Excellence in the Teaching of Clinical Medicine, Stanford University School of Medicine (1997, 2011)
- The Kenneth Vosti Teaching Award for Excellence in Teaching, Division of Infectious Diseases, Department of Medicine, Stanford University School of Medicine (2000, 2002)
- The Henry J. Kaiser Award for Excellence in Clinical Teaching, Stanford University School of Medicine (1995)

== 2019 Departure from Stanford ==
Montoya was terminated from Stanford employment in May 2019. His termination occurred after an investigation, led by an outside attorney and an unnamed Stanford faculty member, found what Singh called "multiple violations of the University's conduct policies." The investigation was launched in response to "complaints relating to his conduct," according to the email. The University did not comment further on the situation. In June 2019, the Stanford Daily reported that a former member of the Myalgic Encephalomyelitis/Chronic Fatigue Syndrome (ME/CFS) Initiative, which Montoya previously led, stated that "violations of sexual harassment and sexual misconduct policy" were behind the complaint. Montoya issued a formal apology, stating, "I sincerely apologize to anyone who, in any way, I offended. What has unfolded since March has been a huge surprise and devastating to me and my family. It was even more shattering to learn, through the June 4 Stanford Daily article, that it was members of my Stanford ME/CFS team who experienced some of my behaviors as attempts at unsolicited sexual acts, harassment, and misconduct. It is extremely important that you know I have not been involved in any sexual or romantic relationships with employees, trainees, colleagues, or CFS team members...The social norms in the U.S. are evolving and quite different than those from my culture and homeland. I did not sufficiently appreciate that difference. It is my responsibility to change and be both mindful and respectful of the boundaries of personal space – and I pledge to do just that."

== Publications ==
He is a co-author of clinical practice guidelines for the diagnosis and management of skin and soft-tissue infections.

- Stevens DL, Bisno AL, Chambers HF, Everett ED, Dellinger P, Goldstein EJ, Gorbach SL, Hirschmann JV, Kaplan EL, Montoya JG, Wade JC. Practice guidelines for the diagnosis and management of skin and soft-tissue infections. Clinical Infectious Diseases. 2005 Nov 15;41(10):1373-406. (cited 1598 times)
- Stevens DL, Bisno AL, Chambers HF, Dellinger EP, Goldstein EJ, Gorbach SL, Hirschmann JV, Kaplan SL, Montoya JG, Wade JC. Practice guidelines for the diagnosis and management of skin and soft tissue infections: 2014 update by the Infectious Diseases Society of America. Clinical infectious diseases. 2014 Jul 15;59(2):e10-52. (cited 1275 times)

His other most cited publications according to Google Scholar are:

- Goldstein EJ, Montoya JG, Remington JS. Management of Toxoplasma gondii infection during pregnancy. Clinical Infectious Diseases. 2008 Aug 15;47(4):554-66. (cited 559 times)
- Montoya JG. Laboratory diagnosis of Toxoplasma gondii infection and toxoplasmosis. The Journal of infectious diseases. 2002 Feb 15;185(Supplement_1):S73-82. (cited 468 times)
- Jones JL, Dargelas V, Roberts J, Press C, Remington JS, Montoya JG. Risk factors for Toxoplasma gondii infection in the United States. Clinical Infectious Diseases. 2009 Sep 15;49(6):878-84.(cited 369 times)
- Remington JS, Thulliez P, Montoya JG. Recent developments for diagnosis of toxoplasmosis. Journal of clinical microbiology. 2004 Mar 1;42(3):941-5.(cited 356 times)
