= Simeón Magaña Stadium =

Estadio Simeón Magaña
- Interactive map of Estadio Simeón Magaña
- Location: Ahuachapán Department, El Salvador
- Coordinates: 13.9270357°N 89.8490534°W
- Capacity: 5,000 (football)
- Surface: Grass

Construction
- Opened: 30 March 1974

Tenants
- Once Municipal (1974–2017; 2025–present); FAS (2019); Once Deportivo (2019–2025)

Simeón Magaña Stadium (Spanish: Estadio Simeón Magaña) is a multi-use stadium in Ahuachapán Department, El Salvador. It is currently used mostly for football matches and is the home stadium of Once Municipal.

Once Municipal hierarchy decided to try to secure their own field so they turned to Arturo Simeón Magaña who owned the land around cancha El Zapotón where Once Municipal played. Simeón Magaña Decided to donate the land on condition it could be the pride of Ahuachapán. Construction began in October 1972 and finished 30 March 1974.

In 2019, the stadium was remodeled to increase the capacity to 5,000 spectators.
