= C.D. Tehuacan =

Salvadoran football club

C.D. Tehuacán
- Full name: Club Deportivo Tehuacán Tecoluca
- Founded: 1928
- Ground: Complejo Deportivo de Tecoluca; Tecoluca, San Vicente, El Salvador
- Chairman: (El Salvador) Mario Salinas
- Manager: (Chile) Juan Carlos Carreño
Home colours

Club Deportivo Tehuacán was a Salvadoran football club based in Tecoluca, San Vicente department, El Salvador.

== History ==
After winning the 2007 Clausura in the Salvadoran Third Division the team played the 2007/2008 season in the country's second tier. Before the 2009 Clausura season they merged with Independiente Nacional 1906 and then were renamed Independiente Tehuacán and were still allowed to play in the second division but disappeared after that.

== Achievements ==
- Salvadoran Third Division: 1

2007 Clausura

== Club ==
=== Rivalries ===
C.D. Tehuacán main rival was Platense. They are rivals since both clubs are only separated by 11 km.

=== Supporters ===
C.D. Tehuacán were mostly supported by the Tehuacan community, but also gained support and funding from the United States.

== List of coaches ==
- (El Salvador) Iván "El Diablo" Ruiz (2007–2008)
- (Chile) Juan Carlos Carreño
