= Salvador Coreas (footballer, born 1984) =

Salvadoran footballer (born 1984)

Personal information
- Full name: Salvador Arturo Coreas Pérez
- Date of birth: September 29, 1984 (age 42)
- Place of birth: San Miguel, El Salvador
- Height: 1.78 m (5 ft 10 in)
- Positions: Midfielder; second striker

Team information
- Current team: Municipal Limeño
- Number: 10

Youth career
- 2002–2003: Mar y Plata

Senior career*
Years	Team	Apps	(Gls)
2004–2005	Águila		
2005–2006	Atlético Balboa		
2007–2009	Vista Hermosa	66	(6)
2009–2010	Municipal Limeño		
2010–2011	C.D. Dragón		
2011–2012	Municipal Limeño		

International career
2008–2009	El Salvador	36	(0)
- * Club domestic league appearances and goals

Salvador Arturo Coreas Pérez (born September 29, 1984) is a Salvadoran former footballer who played as a midfielder or second striker. He is the older brother of El Salvador U20 national team member and former Vista Hermosa player Raúl Antonio Coreas.

== Club career ==
Nicknamed Chamba, Coreas was born in San Miguel. He made his professional debut at Salvadoran giants Águila and had two spells at Atlético Balboa before joining Vista Hermosa. In 2009, he moved to Municipal Limeño. He was ruled out by a ligament injury for the major part of the 2010 Clausura.

== International career ==
Coreas received his first call up to the national team in January 2008. He officially received his first cap on January 22, 2008, in a friendly match against Belize. He went on to win 36 caps, scoring no goals. He has represented his country in 12 FIFA World Cup qualification matches and played at the 2009 UNCAF Nations Cup and at the 2009 CONCACAF Gold Cup.

His most recent international game was an October 2009 FIFA World Cup qualification match against Mexico.
