= Malacoff =

Association football club in El Salvador

- Full name: Malacoff
- Dissolved: 2010

Malacoff were a Salvadoran professional football club based in Izalco, Sonsonate, El Salvador.

== History ==
Named C.D. Curazao, the club was relocated in 2008 from Jayaque, La Libertad, to Izalco and renamed back to his historical name of Malacoff.

In 2010, Malacoff failed to enroll to the Salvadoran Third Division and ceased to exist.

== Honours ==
=== Domestic honours ===
==== Leagues ====
- Tercera División Salvadorean and predecessors
  - Champions (2) : N/A
  - Play-off winner (2):
- La Asociación Departamental de Fútbol Aficionado' and predecessors (4th tier)
  - Champions (1):
  - Play-off winner (2):

== Current squad ==
Note: Flags indicate national team as defined under FIFA eligibility rules; some limited exceptions apply. Players may hold more than one non-FIFA nationality.

No.	Pos.	Nation	Player
7		SLV	Bryan Barton
10		SLV	Jorge Ticas
11		SLV	Tito Nolasco
14		SLV	Fernando Martinez
15		SLV	Jose Flores
17		SLV	Carlos Roque
27		SLV	Juan Diego
30		SLV	Jaime Moran
29		SLV	Edwin Mendoza
31		SLV	Daniel Linares
36		SLV	Jorge Crespo
—		SLV	Diego Ochoa

No.	Pos.	Nation	Player
—		SLV	Bryan Salguero
—		SLV	Hector Mazariego
—		SLV	Daniel Reimundo
—		SLV	Diego Peraza
—		SLV	Denis Martinez
—		SLV	Marlon Salguero
—		SLV	Diego Ochoa

== Notable coaches ==
- Carlos Recinos
- Gonzalo "Chalo" Henríquez (1984)
- Carlos E. Torres
- Salvatore Leon (-Present)
