= Óscar del Solar =

Chilean soccer manager (born 1958)

Oscar del Solar
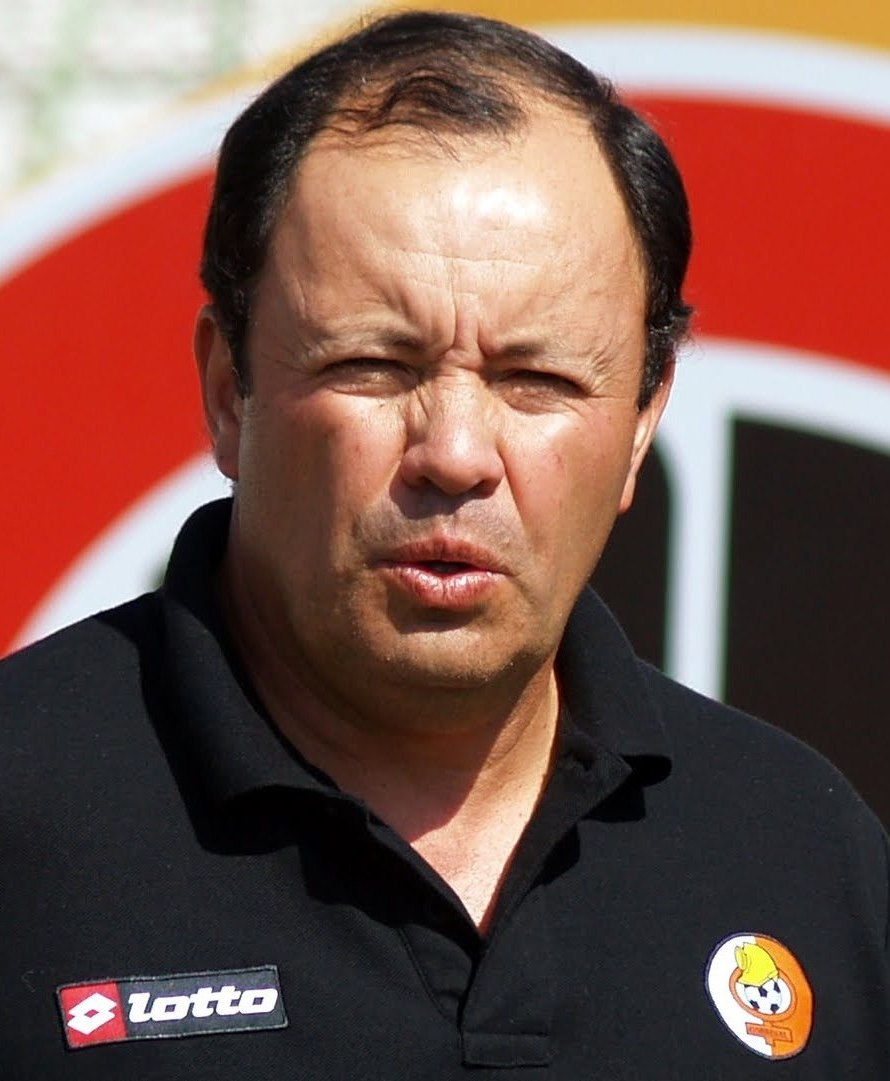
- Del Solar leading Cobresal in 2012

Personal information
- Full name: Oscar Jorge Del Solar Villarroel
- Date of birth: 2 June 1958 (age 68)
- Place of birth: Concepción, Chile

Managerial career
- Years: Team
- Lanús (reserves)
- 1998–1999: Deportes Concepción
- 2000–2001: Audax Italiano
- 2002–2003: Rangers
- 2004–2005: Deportes Concepción
- 2005: Alianza
- 2005: El Salvador
- 2006: Tiro Federal
- 2006: Rampla Juniors
- 2007–2009: Rangers
- 2010: Ñublense
- 2010–2011: Deportes Concepción
- 2012–2013: Cobresal
- 2015: Técnico Universitario
- 2021–2022: Deportes Concepción
- 2025–2026: Sportivo Luqueño (assistant)

Oscar Jorge Del Solar Villarroel is a Chilean football manager.

== Career ==
Del Solar has coached a number of Chilean teams, including Deportes Concepción, Audax Italiano and Rangers de Talca. He coached the Lanús reserves and Tiro Federal in Argentina, Alianza FC of El Salvador and Rampla Juniors of Uruguay.

His last club was Deportes Concepción from 2021 to 2022.

In late 2025, Del Solar joined the technical staff of Lucas Barrios as an assistant coach for Paraguayan club Sportivo Luqueño.

== Honours ==
Lanús (reserves)

- Campeonato Reserva (2): 1991 Apertura, 1991 Clausura
