= Carlos Menjívar =

Salvadoran footballer (born 1981)

Carlos Menjívar Jr.
Personal information
- Full name: Carlos Alberto Menjívar Aguilar, Jr.
- Date of birth: April 13, 1981 (age 45)
- Place of birth: San Francisco, California, United States
- Height: 5 ft 11 in (1.80 m)
- Position: Midfielder

Youth career
- 1996–1997: Academia Tahuichi
- 1997–2000: AGSS Los Angeles
- 2000–2001: San Diego State Aztecs

Senior career*
Years	Team	Apps	(Gls)
2002–2004	FAS	37	(5)
2004–2005	Águila	18	(2)
2005–2007	FAS	16	(3)
2007–2008	Once Municipal		
2009	Isidro Metapán	14	(1)
2009–2010	Municipal Limeño	8	(1)

International career
2002–2007	El Salvador	16	(0)
- * Club domestic league appearances and goals

Carlos Alberto Menjívar Aguilar Jr. (born April 13, 1981) is a former professional footballer who last played for Limeno F.C. Born in the United States, he played for the El Salvador national team.

== Club career ==
In his early years, Menjívar spent a year at the Tahuichi Academy in Bolivia, before playing at the American Global Soccer School and college soccer in his native California. In 2002, he joined Salvadoran giants FAS, making his debut in June 2002 against Mexican side UANL Tigres. He then left for league rivals Águila, only to return to FAS after a year. In 2007, he moved to Isidro Metapan and won a championship after a season with the club. Isidro Metapán before moving to Municipal Limeño Primera División de Fútbol Salvadoreño.

== International career ==
Menjívar made his debut for El Salvador in a November 2002 friendly match against the United States and has earned a total of 16 caps, scoring no goals. He has represented his country at the 2003 UNCAF Nations Cup as well as at the 2003 and 2007 CONCACAF Gold Cups.

His final international match was a June 2007 CONCACAF Gold Cup game against Trinidad & Tobago.

== Honours ==
- Primera División de Fútbol de El Salvador: 3

2002 Clausura, 2002 Apertura, 2003 Apertura

Profesional Clasura 2007|2008

== Coaching career ==
- 2010-2012 United Futbol Club
- 2012-2014 Temecula Hawks
- 2014-2015 San Diego State University Director of Operations Men's Soccer
- 2017-2018 Santa Clara University Assistant Men's Soccer
- 2016-2024 MVLA Soccer Club (Boys Director)
- 2017- PDL-Burlingame Dragons Assistant Coach
- 2024-Bay Area Surf Girls Director(ECNL)
- 2024-Girls Next Level Training Program(Technical Director)
