= Álex Erazo =

Salvadoran footballer (born 1980)

Personal information
- Full name: Álexander Amílcar Erazo Meléndez
- Date of birth: July 28, 1980 (age 46)
- Place of birth: San Salvador, El Salvador
- Height: 1.80 m (5 ft 11 in)
- Position: Forward

Youth career
- 2000–2003: Los Angeles

Senior career*
Years	Team	Apps	(Gls)
2003–2005	Alianza		
2005–2009	Águila		
2009–2010	Alianza	29	(7)
2010–2011	Luis Ángel Firpo	18	(4)
2012	Juventud Independiente		

International career^{‡}
2004–2007	El Salvador	12	(1)
- * Club domestic league appearances and goals as of December 12, 2010 ‡ National team caps and goals as of November 30, 2009

Alexander Amílcar Erazo Meléndez (born July 28, 1980 in El Salvador) is a former Salvadoran football player who last played for Juventud Independiente in the Primera División de Fútbol de El Salvador.

== Club career ==
Nicknamed el Paleta, Erazo started his career at third division side Los Angeles from San Luis Talpa and joined premier division side Alianza three years later. In 2005, he moved to rivals Águila where he became joined top goalscorer and won a championship medal when he scored twice in the final of the 2006 Clausura. He returned to Alianza in 2009 only to leave them for Luis Ángel Firpo a year later.

== International career ==
Erazo made his debut with El Salvador national team on August 30, 2003 in a friendly against MLS side D.C. United. At the time, El Salvador was coached by Juan Ramón Paredes, and this game was used as a way to test players that had previously not played for the national team. It was not registered by FIFA as a full international friendly. Erazo 46 minutes before being substituted for Ludwig Meraz. His official debut came on April 28 the following year, when he was part of a friendly match against Colombia that was played at Robert F. Kennedy Memorial Stadium in Washington.

After a couple of years of being overlooked by national team management, Erazo was finally once again given a chance to prove himself under new head coach Carlos de los Cobos on November 15, 2006 in a friendly against Bolivia. In this game Erazo scored a brilliant goal, and impressed many with his great speed, athleticism and play off the ball. After this game, Erazo became somewhat of a key player for the national team and started every game.

In February 2007, El Salvador hosted the UNCAF Nations Cup, and it was no surprise to anyone to see Erazo was selected in the team. Controversially, before the tournament even started, Erazo stated that he would score a minimum of five goals during the event. This was seen by many as a bad move considering that at the time, the national team had a lot of problems with scoring. But considering that El Salvador had two games against traditionally weaker teams like Nicaragua and Belize, it was not seen as impossible for Erazo to achieve what he intended. As the event began, Erazo was played from the offset in the starting 11, but as the games went on and he did not score, Carlos de los Cobos began to look at other alternatives and Erazo began to get subbed early in the games. When the event ended, Erazo finished with zero goals, and although he showed various glimpses of great play, many fans and officials asked for Carlos de los Cobos to look for other players in his position. As a result, Erazo has not played again with the national team since that last game in the UNCAF Nations Cup against Guatemala on February 18, 2007. Many feel that this is because he failed to live up to the hype that he put on himself, while many other believe that his ego had a negative effect on the team.

=== International goals ===
Scores and results list El Salvador's goal tally first.

#	Date	Venue	Opponent	Score	Result	Competition
1	15 November 2006	Estadio Hernando Siles, La Paz, Bolivia	Bolivia	1-3	1-5	Friendly match
