= C.D. Once Municipal =

Association football club in El Salvador

Once Municipal
- Full name: Club Deportivo Once Municipal
- Nickname: Los Canarios (The Canaries)
- Founded: 20 August 1945; 2025; 1 year ago (refounded)
- Ground: Estadio Simeón Magaña, Ahuachapán, El Salvador
- Capacity: 5,000
- Website: www.cdoncemunicipal.com
Home colours	Away colours

Club Deportivo Once Municipal, also known as Once Municipal, is a Salvadoran professional football club based in Ahuachapán, Ahuachapán department, The club currently plays in the Liga de Ascenso. Their colors are blue and yellow and the team mascot is a canary. Which provided the team nicknames Los Canarios or the Canaries in english. The club currently play its matches at the Estadio Simeón Magaña, which has a capacity of 5,000.

== History ==
=== Foundation and early years ===
Once Municipal was founded on 20 August 1945 by Salvador Marinero, who arrived in Ahuachapán from San Vicente in 1946. He was the owner of a factory in Ahuachapán. After discussing the venture with his neighbors, he put together a football team to play in El Salvador's second division.

After a year of managing the team, Marinero asked Don Alfonso Salaverría, a property tycoon and the mayor of Ahuachapán, to help the team with equipment, finances, and logistics. Salaverría accepted Marinero's invitation, but wanted to see the team play first. Salaverría observed a practice at Llano del Espino, a field on the outskirts of the city where the team was based, but was unimpressed with the quality of the players. He issued instructions for Once Municipal to be reinforced with second division players such as defender René "Chacuate" Moscoso, a shoemaker. Salaverría signed Moscoso despite Marinero's protests against Moscoso's young age.

The club was officially founded after Salaverría gave the team one colon for player wages. It played its first game in August 1946 against Ferrocarril, which Once won 3–1. Their first season was a success, finishing second on the league standings.

=== 1948–49: First national league title ===
In 1948, the team was promoted to the Primera Division, the highest league in El Salvadorian football. Due to the team's successful previous seasons, Salaverría began recruiting more players and staff, including two Costa Ricans (the first to play in Salvadoran football) and coach Armando Chacón of FAS for the 1948–49 season. The team's first season in Primera Division was a success, with Once Municipal finishing first in the national tournament and winning a title.

=== 1950s–1960s: After the title ===
After the club won the national title, the players demanded more money. As Salaverría couldn't afford to keep paying large player salaries, a large exodus of players began in the "First Canary Leak", most leaving for other first division teams and the newly founded Atlético Marte. In the 1950–51 season, the club was punished with demotion to the fourth division for not paying its players. When the club regrouped financially, it quickly rose through the leagues, again achieving qualification to Primera Division in 1955. However, more financial problems led Salaverría to sell Once Municipal's 1959 Primera Division spot to Atlético Constancia (later Alianza F.C.) for one colon.

Once Municipal was promoted again to the first division in 1963, where it led an average performance as a midtable team. However, another fiasco arose in 1969–70 when players and management once again disagreed on wages, leading to a large exodus of players and the relegation of the club.

=== 1970s: Second ascent ===
In the 1970s, Once Municipal management decided to try to secure the team its own field. They turned to Arturo Simeón Magaña, the landowner of the area around El Zapotón, the field where Once Municipal played. Simeón Magaña decided to donate the land to the team on the condition that the team "would be the pride of Ahuachapán".

With a new stadium, Once Municipal became a dominant team in the 1970s. Although they were not able to win any titles, they finished at the top of the table in 1978 and 1979.

=== 1980s–1990s: Sharp decline ===
In 1980, Once Municipal was again relegated, this time for poor performance in the league. The club remained in Second Division for the next fifteen years, and was even briefly demoted to Third Division in 1993.

=== 2004–2006: League and cup double ===
The controversial Adalid Magaña took over the team in 1999 to save it from financial crisis.

Once was not a favorite to be promoted the Primera circuit in 2004. Financial problems continued to plague the team and many worried that it would go bankrupt. The Once Lobos were the firm candidate in the league to gain direct promotion and had experienced players such as Memo Rivera and William Renderos, as well as Edwin Portillo as a coach. However, Once Municipal won 3–2 on the afternoon of 22 May 2004 in an unexpected upset against the Lobos at Estadio Cuscatlán with a hat trick by Colombian Víctor Jaramillo that solidified Once's place at the top of the Segunda Division and its place in the Primera Division the next season, returning to the top tier for the first time in 25 years.

In 2006, the club had its most successful period ever under Nelson Mauricio Ancheta, who filled the roster with players released by more prominent teams. The club won its first Copa Presidente with a 1–0 victory over C.D. Águila on 22 November, giving the club its second ever title. Once also won the grand final of the 2006 Apertura Tournament on 17 December against C.D. FAS. Although they began trailing in the scoreline with an own goal by Nelson Nerio, Once equalised with seven minutes remaining, which sent the game into overtime, where Once were able to score two more goals and win 3–1, to clinch the club's second league title and third overall title while completing a league and cup double.

=== 2007–2014: Promotions and relegations ===
In 2008, the team was once again relegated to the Second Division due to poor management, coaching errors and the underperformance of high-earning players.

In 2010 the club won their relegation/promotion battle with Municipal Limeño to regain promotion to Primera Division. The club was relegated at the end of the next season but were given a reprieve after Atletico Balboa was demoted due to their failure to pay the league. Once was finally relegated at the end of the Clausura 2013 season.

=== Demise and new club ===
On 17 January 2018 Once Municipal were stripped of their football license due to unpaid fees to Segunda Division and lack of payments to players and coaches.

On 20 July 2019, a new club was founded by members of the defunct Once Municipal. It acquired the spot of C.D. Pasaquina, which was forced to sell its spot due to massive debt. The name of the new club is Once Deportivo FC.

=== Rebirth ===
On May 9, 2025 Once Deportivo announced they sold their spot to the historic club Hercules was would be taking over Once Deportivo's former spot in the Primera División series in the Apertura 2025, which left a huge gap for fans of Ahuachapan. On June 20, 2025 on the club social media page Once Municipal announced they would be purchasing the spot of Malacoff and will be participating in the Tercera División Salvadorean for the 2025-2026 season.

== Honours ==
=== Domestic honours ===
==== Leagues ====
- Primera División de Fútbol Profesional and predecessors
  - Champions (2) : 1948–49, Apertura 2006
  - Runners-up (6): 1946, 1957–58, 1965–66, 1976–77, 1977–78, Apertura 2011
- Segunda División Salvadorean and predecessors
  - Champions (2) : 1955, 2009 Apertura
  - Runners-up (0): N/A
  - Play-off winner (1): 1975-1976
- Tercera División Salvadorean and predecessors
  - Champions (0) : N/A
  - Play-off winner (0): N/A
- La Asociación Departamental de Fútbol Aficionado' and predecessors (4th tier)
  - Champions (0): N/A
  - Play-off winner (0): N/A

==== Cups ====
- Copa President and predecessors
  - Champions (1) : 2006–07

== Crest, colors and nicknames ==
Once Municipal crest

The team's colors are yellow, white and blue, which have been the same since the club was founded. Their home jerseys consist of a yellow shirt and shorts with blue socks. Their away jerseys consist of blue shirts and shorts with yellow socks.

Their crest is made up of the number 11, representing the Municipality of Ahuchapan, and the canary, which is the team mascot and symbol.

The nickname given to Once Municipal is Canarios, a reference to their Canary mascot.

== Stadium ==
- Estadio Simeón Magaña (1974–2017;2025–Present)
  - Llano del Espino Canchas (1946-1973)

Once Municipal played their home games at the Estadio Simeón Magaña, which has a capacity of 5,000 people. It is located in the city center of Ahuachapan. Prior to the construction of its stadium, the club trained and played home games at the Llano del Espino in Canchas.

== Supporters ==
Once Municipal are renowned in El Salvador for the support that the team receives, especially at home games. Once Municipal's fan club is called the "Fuerza Canaria". The "Fuerza Canaria" is an ultra group that supports the team at games by singing songs, waving banners and flags, and wearing the team's colors.

== Kit manufacturers and shirt sponsors ==
=== Kit manufacturers ===
- 2006–2017 : Milan

=== Shirt sponsors ===
- TBD: None
- 2006–2010: Tigo, La Geo, Pilsener, MK, Fila
- 2011: Tigo, La Geo
- 2011–2013: La Geo, La Tropicano
- 2014–2016: La Geo
- 2016: Megafrio, Servitroya, Titanium
- 2017: TCS, TropiGas, LaGeo, SalvaCola

=== Sponsorship ===
Companies that Once Municipal currently has sponsorship deals with for 2025–2026 includes:

- (El Salvador) Elite Sportswear – Official kit suppliers
- (United States) AGM Sports Inc – Official sponsors
- (El Salvador) Tu Financiera – Official sponsors
- (China) Oppo – Official sponsors
- (El Salvador) Termales La Montaña - Hot Springs – Official sponsors
- (El Salvador) Alcaldía Municipal de Ahuachapán Centro – Official sponsors
- (El Salvador) Granja Avícola de Ahuachapán – Official sponsors

== Records ==
=== Club records ===
- First Match (prior to creation of a league): vs. TBD, 1946
- First Match (official): vs. Ferrocarril 3-1 (a club from La Libertad,), August 1946
- Most points in La Primera: 41 points (13 win, 15 draws, 5 losses) 1986/87
- Least points in La Primera: 11 points (1 win, 8 draws, 27 losses) 1996/97
- Most League appearances: 317, TBD (TBD)
- Most League goals scored: total, Tbd, TBD (1998–2003)
- Most League goals scored, season: 13,
- Worst season: TBD 2002-2003: 0 win, 0 draws and 0 losses (0 points)
- Debut in Concacaf Competition: 2016–17 CONCACAF Champions League
- First CONCACAF Champions League match: Dragon 1–2 Portland Timbers; TBD; 3, August 2016.
- Most wins in a row: TBD, TBD - TBD
- Most home wins in a row (all competitions): TBD, TBD– TBD
- Most home league wins in a row: TBD, TBD - TBD
- Most away wins in a row: TBD, TBD – TBD
- Most draws in a row: TBD, TBD
- Most home draws in a row: TBD, TBD
- Most away draws in a row: TBD, TBD
- Most defeats in a row: 8, TBD
- Most home defeats in a row: TBD, TBD
- Most away defeats in a row: TBD, TBD
- Longest unbeaten run: TBD, TBD
- Longest unbeaten run at home: TBD, TBD
- Longest unbeaten run away: TBD, TBD
- Longest winless run: 10 Games, 21 October 2012 – 9 February 2013
- Longest winless run at home: TBD, TBD – TBD
- Longest winless run away: TBD, TBD - TBD

=== Individual records ===
- Most capped player for El Salvador: 50 (0 whilst at Once Lobos), Luis Guevara Mora
- Most international caps for El Salvador while a Once Lobos player: 1, TBD
- Most goals in a season, all competitions: unknown player, 62 (1927/28) (47 in League, 15 in Cup competitions)
- Most goals in a season, La Primera: TBD, 7

=== Overall seasons table in La Primera ===
Pos.	Club	Season In La Primera	Pl.	W	D	L	GS	GA	Dif.
TBA	Once Municipal	11	310	77	108	125	340	439	-99

Last updated: 9 October 2022

=== Historical Matches ===
January 1, 1947 Friendly	Once Municipal	1-4	Club Leon	San Salvador, El Salvador
	Rene Guitterez		Guillermo Flores; Marcos Aurelo; Alfredo Costa	Stadium: Estadio Flor Blanco

January 3, 1947 Friendly	Once Municipal	1-1	Club Leon	San Salvador, El Salvador
	TBD		Marcos Aurelio	Stadium: Estadio Flor Blanco

February 13, 1966 Friendly	Once Municipal	0-3	Botafogo	San Salvador, El Salvador
	Nil		TBD; TBD	Stadium: Estadio Flor Blanco

1968 Friendly	Once Municipal	2-1	Guatemala national football team	Guatemala City, Guatemala
	Goal		Goal	Stadium: Estadio Mateo Flores

== Current squad ==
As of August 2026:
Note: Flags indicate national team as defined under FIFA eligibility rules; some limited exceptions apply. Players may hold more than one non-FIFA nationality.

No.	Pos.	Nation	Player
—	FW	ESA	Alexander Guerrero
—	MF	ESA	Josie Artero
—	DF	ESA	Geovanni Cortéz
—	GK	ESA	Emerson Herrera
—	DF	ESA	Sebastián Sosa
—	MF	ESA	Fernando Echegoyen
—	MF	ESA	Carlos Lainez
—	MF	ESA	Fernando Santillana
—	GK	ESA	Miguel Ramírez
—	DF	ESA	Jesus Orellana
—		ESA	Marvin Morales
—		ESA	
—		ESA	
—		ESA	

No.	Pos.	Nation	Player
2		ESA	Manuel Orellana
—		ESA	Marvin Morrales
7		ESA	Bryan Guerrero
15		ESA	Roger Herrera
21		ESA	Luis Leiva
—		ESA	David Rivera
2	DF	ESA	Fabricio Bolanos
4		ESA	Josué Santos
6		ESA	Wilson Ramos
14	DF	ESA	Roni Bran
15	GK	ESA	Alessando Morán
20	MF	ESA	Jeison Herrera
30	GK	ESA	Carlos Caballero
—		ESA	Bryan Pineda
—		ESA	Levi Ponce

=== Players with dual citizenship ===
- (El Salvador) (United States) Roni Bran

=== In ===
Note: Flags indicate national team as defined under FIFA eligibility rules; some limited exceptions apply. Players may hold more than one non-FIFA nationality.

No.	Pos.	Nation	Player
—	MF	ESA	Marvin Morrales (From Hércules)
—	MF	ESA	Efrain Carcamo (From Hércules)
—	MF	ESA	Michael Lopez (From El Roble)
—	MF	ESA	Bryan Mancia (From Fuerte Aguilares)
—	DF	COL	Juan Navarrete (From Espartano)
—	MF	ESA	Anderson Osorio (From Juventud Candelareño)
—	FW	ESA	Miguel Martinez (From Juventud Candelareño)
—	FW	ESA	Rony Aguilar (From Juventud Candelareño)

No.	Pos.	Nation	Player
—		ESA	Nelson Escalante (From CD Vencedor)
—		ESA	Erick Vasquez (From FAS sub-17)
—	FW	ESA	Marcos Natividad (From Promesa FC)
—	DF	ESA	Roberto Sandoval (From Juventud Palo Pique)
—	DF	ESA	Alan Galica (From RL Soccer Academy)

=== Out ===
Note: Flags indicate national team as defined under FIFA eligibility rules; some limited exceptions apply. Players may hold more than one non-FIFA nationality.

No.	Pos.	Nation	Player
—		ESA	Steven Cerna (To TBD)
—		ESA	Kevin Román (To TBD)
—		ESA	Francisco Hasfura (To TBD)
—		ESA	José Aguilera (To TBD)

No.	Pos.	Nation	Player
—		ESA	Manuel Castro (To TBD)
—		ESA	Josué Artero (To TBD)
—		ESA	Luis Vasquez (To TBD)

== Players ==
=== Notable players ===
Below are the notable former and current players who have represented Once Municipal and international competition since the club's foundation in 1912. To appear in the section below, a player must have either played in at least 50 official matches for the club or represented their country's national team playing for Once Municipal before, during or after departing the club.

- (El Salvador) Dagoberto Portillo
- (El Salvador) (Colombia) Elder Figueroa
- (El Salvador) Ramon Flores
- (El Salvador) Héctor Ávalos
- (El Salvador) Mario Deras
- (El Salvador) Kevin Santamaria
- (Panama) Francisco Portillo
- (El Salvador) Diego Mejia
- (El Salvador) Juan Ramon Martinez
- (El Salvador) (United States) Carlos Menjivar
- (El Salvador) Elias Montes
- (El Salvador) (Brazil) Israel Castro Franco
- (Nicaragua) (El Salvador) Armando Collado
- (El Salvador) Ronald Pimentel
- (El Salvador) Osael Romero
- (Panama) Anel Canales
- (El Salvador) Gustavo Guerrero
- (El Salvador) José Rodolfo “Chofo” Cea
- (El Salvador) Jorge Adalberto ”Conejo” Lievano
- (El Salvador) Rafael Búcaro
- (El Salvador) Maximiliano Cubas
- (Jamaica) Sean Fraser
- (El Salvador) Raúl Magaña
- (El Salvador) Mario Antonio Monge
- (El Salvador) José Antonio Quintanilla
- (El Salvador) Jorge Suárez Landaverde

== Notable players ==
=== Team captains ===
Name	Years
(El Salvador) Raúl Magaña	1965
(Argentina) Roberto Lopez	1976
(Colombia) Víctor Jaramillo	2004
(El Salvador) Mario Elías Guevara	2005-2006
(Colombia) Miguel Solis	2011
Hiatus	2018-2025
(El Salvador) Kevin Román	2025-2026
(El Salvador) Michael López	2026-Present

== Personnel ==
=== Current technical staff ===
As of September, 2026

Position	Name
Manager	(El Salvador) Jorge Abrego
Assistant manager	(El Salvador) Daniel Avalos
Goalkeeping coach	(El Salvador) Carlos Palma
Fitness coach	(El Salvador) Carlos Contreras
Club Doctor	(El Salvador) TBD
knesliogiocal	(El Salvador) Jose navarro
Utility	(El Salvador) William Moreno

=== Management ===
As of May 1, 2026

Position	Name
Owner	(El Salvador)
President	(El Salvador) Otto Aguillon
Vice President	(El Salvador) Mario Eguizabal
Secretary	(El Salvador) Marcos Contrears
Treasurer	(El Salvador) Broderic Herrera
Director	(El Salvador) Otto Herrera
Director	(El Salvador) Ricardo Espinzoa
Director	(El Salvador) Welter Trujillo
Administrative Manager	(El Salvador)
Representative of the Once Deportivo	(El Salvador)
Club Delegate	(El Salvador)
Vice Secretary	(Venezuela)
Sponsor Director	(El Salvador)
Vice Sponsor Director	(El Salvador)

== Coaches ==
=== 1940s ===
- (El Salvador) Armando Chanco (1949–50)

=== 1950s ===
- (El Salvador) Armando Chanco (1949–50)

=== 1960s ===
- (Argentina) José Alberto Cevasco Che (1965)

=== 1970s ===
- (El Salvador) Salvador Alfonso Cabeza (1970)
- (El Salvador) Julio “Merienda” Olivares (1972)
- (El Salvador) Rodolfo Cea Chofo Torrento (March 1974-)
- (Chile) Carlos Javier Mascaro (1975-1977)
- (Guatemala) Jorge Roldán (1976–1978)
- (El Salvador) Rodolfo Cea Chofo (1977)

=== 1980s ===
- (El Salvador) TBD

=== 1990s ===
- (El Salvador) Cristo Arnoldo Velásquez Farfán (1991–1992)
- (El Salvador) Carlos Recinos (1993–1995)
- (El Salvador) Oscar Emigdio Benítez (1998–1999)

=== 2000s ===
- (El Salvador) (Brazil) Jorge Tupinambá (2001 – 2002)
- (El Salvador) Marco Pineda (2002 – 2003)
- (El Salvador) Oscar Emigdio Benítez (2004)
- (El Salvador) Henry Rojas (2004)
- (Uruguay) Miguel Mansilla (2005 – 2006)
- (Argentina) Jorge Alberto García (June 2006)
- (El Salvador) Nelson Mauricio Ancheta (July 2006 – June 2007)
- (Argentina) Abel Moralejo (July 2007 - October 2007)
- (Argentina) Hugo Coria (October 2007 – March 2008)
- (El Salvador) Juan Ramón Paredes (March 2008 – April 2008)
- (El Salvador) Mario Elias Guevara (April 2008 – May 2008)
- (El Salvador) Jorge Abrego (June 2008 – October 9)
- (El Salvador) Nelson Mauricio Ancheta (October 2009 – December 9)

=== 2010s ===
- (El Salvador) Ricardo Mena Laguán (January 2010 – April 10)
- (El Salvador) Nelson Mauricio Ancheta (April 2010 – February 11)
- (El Salvador) Marcos Pineda (February 2011 – March 11)
- (Argentina) Juan Andrés Sarulyte (March 2011 – April 2012)
- (El Salvador) Leonel Cárcamo (June 2012 – August 2012)
- (Argentina) Juan Andrés Sarulyte (August 2012 – October 2013)
- (El Salvador) Ivan 'Diablo' Ruiz (November 2013 – December 2014)
- (El Salvador) Marco Pineda (December 2014– May 2015)
- (El Salvador) Giovanni Trigueros (June 2015 – February 2016)
- (El Salvador) Sandra Martinez (February 2016)
- (El Salvador) Rubén Guevara (March 2016 – August 2016)
- (El Salvador) Victor Coreas (September 2016 – December 2016)
- (Argentina) Juan Andrés Sarulyte (January 2017 – June 2017)
- (El Salvador) Ivan Ruiz (July 2017 – November 2017)
- (El Salvador) Ernesto Iraheta (December 2017 – December 2017)
- Hiatus (January 2018 - December 2019)

=== 2020s ===
- Hiatus (January 2020 - June 2025)
- (El Salvador) Henry Rojas (June 2025 - December 2025)
- (El Salvador) Mauricio Artero (December 2025 - July 2026)
- (El Salvador) Jorge Abrego (July 2026 - Present)

=== Others ===
- José Orlando Contreras

=== Notable managers ===
The following managers have won at least one trophy while in charge at Once Municipal:

Name	Nationality	From	To	Honours
Armando Chanco	El Salvador	1 June 1948	1 February 1950	1 Primera División de Fútbol Profesional (1948-1949)
TBD	El Salvador	1 June 1955	1 February 1956	1 Segunda División Salvadorean (1955)
Rodolfo Cea	El Salvador	1 June 1974	1 February 1976	1 Segunda División Salvadorean (1975-1976)
Jorge Roldan	Guatemala	1 June 1978	1 February 1978	1 Runners up Primera División de Fútbol Profesional (1978)
Nelson Mauricio Ancheta	El Salvador	1 July 2006; 1 October 2009	1 June 2007; 1 December 2009	1 Apertura 2006 (2018 Apertura); 1 Copa President (2006–07); 1 Segunda División Salvadorean (2009 Apertura)

== List of presidents ==
- Alfonso Salaverria (1946–1959)
- Antonio Salaverria (1970–1979)
- Ricardo Espinoza (1979–1999)
- Adalid Magaña (1999–2009)
- Andrés Rodríguez Celis (2009–2012)
- Oswaldo Magaña (2012–2016)
- Carlos Calderón (2016)
- Omar Maldonado (2016–2018)
- Eliseo Juárez (2025-2026)
- Otto Aguillon (2026-Present)

=== Others ===
- José Orlando Contreras
