= Néstor Ayala =

Paraguayan footballer (born 1983)

Personal information
- Full name: Néstor Ayala Villagra
- Date of birth: 18 February 1983 (age 43)
- Place of birth: San Lorenzo, Paraguay
- Height: 1.77 m (5 ft 10 in)
- Position: Striker

Senior career*
| Years | Team | Apps | (Gls) |
| 2004 | Sportivo Iteño | 18 | (9) |
| 2004–2005 | Once Lobos | | |
| 2005–2006 | Atlético Balboa | | |
| 2006–2007 | FAS | | |
| 2007 | Club Sportivo Luqueño | 20 | (8) |
| 2007–2010 | Club Atlético Tigre | 57 | |
| 2010 | Deportivo Quito | | (6) |
| 2011 | Deportivo Cuenca | 20 | (8) |
| 2011 | San Martín de San Juan | 8 | (0) |
| 2012 | Técnico Universitario | 13 | (1) |
| 2012–2013 | Sportivo Luqueño | 0 | (0) |
| 2014 | 12 de Octubre FC | | |

International career
| 2007–2010 | Paraguay | 3 | (1) |
- * Club domestic league appearances and goals

Néstor Ayala Villagra (born 18 February 1983) is a Paraguayan former professional footballer who played as a striker.

== Club career ==
Ayala began his professional footballing career playing for Sportivo Iteño in the Paraguayan third division. After playing well throughout the season, Ayala was offered trails to play for various clubs in El Salvador's Primera División. Ayala had trails with various clubs but was ultimately signed by Once Lobos for the 2004 Clausura tournament. He spent one year with the Santa Ana club, before transferring to C.D. Atlético Balboa for the 2005 season. After having a solid year with Atlético Balboa, Ayala finished the 2005–06 Apertura championship as his team's top goalscorer and tied for second as the league's leading scorer. As a result of his consistently good performances, Ayala arose interest from some of El Salvador larger clubs, and ultimately signed a three-year contract with Club Deportivo FAS for the 2006 Clausura tournament. Ayala had a successful first season with FAS, finishing top scorer for his team. He led FAS to finish second for the season and was a vital part of the team progressing to the final against C.D. Águila (a game they ultimately lost 4–2).

After that season there was talk of Ayala becoming nationalised as a Salvadoran and playing for the national team, along with his teammate Alejandro de la Cruz Bentos, Vista Hermosa's Patricio Barroche and A.D. Isidro Metapán's Rodrigo Lago.

For the 2006 Apertura Ayala once again began the season strong and was fast becoming a fan favourite. After his release, Ayala returned to Paraguay, where he signed with Sportivo Luqueño for the remainder of the season. There he was a part of Luqueño's championship winning team for that season. Ayala remained at the club for the 2006-07 Apertura tournament and was ultimately spotted by Argentina's Club Atlético Tigre.

Ayala transferred to Tigre for a reportedly 2.5 million transfer fee. He had solid performances with Tigre during his first season, one being against Argentine giants River Plate, when he netted two goals. Tigre eventually finished the 2007 Apertura in second place, the highest league finish in the club's history. Ayala made a contribution of 7 goals in 11 games.

Ayala left Tigre to join Ecuadorian Serie A champion Deportivo Quito in July 2010. He scored six goals for Deportivo Quito during the second half of the 2010 Season.

On 1 February 2011, he officially agreed a six-month contract with Deportivo Cuenca.

== International career ==
Ayala was called up to the Paraguay national team in a South American FIFA World Cup qualifier against Ecuador. Ayala played well, scoring a goal and assisting in another in Paraguay's 5–1 win.

== Career statistics ==
| Goal | Date | Venue | Opponent | Score | Result | Competition |
|---|---|---|---|---|---|---|
| 1. | 18 November 2007 | Defensores del Chaco, Asunción, Paraguay | Ecuador | 4–1 | 5–1 | 2010 FIFA World Cup qualification |
