= CD Vista Hermosa =

Association football club in El Salvador

Vista Hermosa
- Full name: Club Deportivo Vista Hermosa
- Nickname: Los Correcaminos (the Roadrunners)
- Founded: 17 April 1999
- Ground: Estadio Correcaminos, San Francisco Gotera, Morazán, El Salvador
- Capacity: 12,000
- Owner: Morazan Investors Association
- Chairman: (El Salvador) Jose Chevo
- Manager: (El Salvador) Elia Salamanca
- League: (El Salvador) Tercera División
Home colours	Away colours

Club Deportivo Vista Hermosa are a Salvadoran professional football club based in San Francisco Gotera, Morazán. The club currently plays in the Tercera División Salvadorean. The team known as the Los Correcaminos ("Roadrunners") are one of three team to win the Primera division in their first season. They were the first team from the Morazán department to represent in the CONCACAF and FIFA international competitions. The team's initial home stadium was the Estadio Luis Amílcar Moreno in San Francisco Gotera, Morazán. In 2009, the club moved to the Estadio Correcaminos.

== Honours ==
=== Domestic honours ===
==== Leagues ====
- Primera División Salvadorean and predecessors
  - Champions (1) : Apertura 2005
- Segunda División Salvadorean and predecessors
  - Champions (1) : 2004 – 2005
- Tercera División Salvadorean and predecessors
  - Champions (2) : N/A
  - Play-off winner (2):
- La Asociación Departamental de Fútbol Aficionado' and predecessors (4th tier)
  - Champions (1): ADFA Morazon Apertura 2023

== History ==
=== Third division ===
C.D. Vista Hermosa was founded on 17 April 1999, by José Gilberto Flores (Paquito Flores). The club's first president was José Gilberto Montoya. He retired for health reasons on 28 December 2000. Pedro Hernandez became the next president who was supported by the club's staff and supporters.

When Hernandez became president, the club was in the third division of Salvadoran soccer. The team was contending for a place in the finals game but lost to Gerardo Barrios University, three points to two. In light of the club's good performance in the third division, Francisco Benitez made an offer to purchase the club for 5,000 Salvadoran colon, approximately 560.85 US dollars. The offer was rejected as being too low. However, in the following season, the club performed poorly and finances were mismanaged. Lacking patrons and sponsors, the club was left in debt to an amount of two billion colon. The club was relegated to the fourth division. On 1 December 2001, Benitez purchased the club for 3,000 colon and became the new president.

A payment of 2,000 colon by Benitez in December 2003 secured the club a place in the second division in the 2003–2004 season.

=== Second division ===
The team won its first match in the second division league of 2004 – 2005. There was much competition in the second division league to advance to the first division with computerised scores scrutinized in detail by the teams and judges.

In the first round of games, Group A drew Fuerte San Francisco, Juventud Independiente, Telecom and Inca Súper Flat. Group B drew Vista Hermosa, C.D. Dragón, C.D. Chalatenango and Independiente Nacional 1906. In the second round, Group A drew Fuerte San Francisco, C.D. Dragón, Independiente Nacional 1906, and Telecom. Group B drew Vista Hermosa, C.D. Chalatenango, Juventud Independiente, and Inca Súper Flat.

In semi-final 1 the competitors were Vista Hermosa and Telecom. Vista Hermosa won 3 points to 2 and after penalties were considered, won four points to three. In semi-final 2, Independiente Nacional 1906 defeated Juventud Independiente, six points to one.

In the final, Vista Hermos played Independiente Nacional 1906. For Vista Hermos, José Mario Martínez was a key player and the team won five points to four. René Domingo Alvarez was effective in the overtime.

The players for Vista Hermosa were: González, Sánchez, Torres, Chinchilla, Romero, Campos, Quiñónez, Portillo, Márquez, Ávila, and Mosquera. The substituting players were Álvarez (31), Sosa (46) and Hernández (104). the players for Independiente Nacional 1906 (Coca-Cola) were Trinidad, González, Martínez, González, Granado, González, Escalante, Alvarado, Montes, and Ramirez. The substituting players were Alfaro (46), Pérez (60) and Pasadi (65).

Data: Herbert Marquez, time goal 36, 39, 86, Eider Mosquera, time goal 59, René Domingo Alvarez, time goal 119, Elías "Chilena" Montes, time goal 21, 24, 82, Ramirez, time goal 43.

=== First division ===
The team was the youngest to win both the second and first division competitions since 1974. At this time, the club created the Correcaminos (roadrunners) brand dedicated to assisting disadvantaged youth.

The team finished second on the Apertura 2005 series table with ten wins, seven losses and one draw. In the semi-finals, the team defeated C.D. Luis Ángel Firpo. In the final, the team played A.D. Isidro Metapán, a strong side that was the favourite. During the season, Metapan had allowed only 13 goals against them in 18 games and had strong players such as Dago Portillo (keeper), William Reyes, Guillermo Rivera and William Osorio. Their strong offensive teams included Barroche-Mosquera and Luis Chicho Elder Figueroa and Torres.

Vista Hermosa's championship squad included Manuel González, Giovanny Romero, Luis Torres (Colombia), Juan Carlos Chinchilla, René Domingo Álvarez, José Eduardo Campos, Elder Figueroa (Colombia), Manfredi Portillo, Herbert Márquez, Patricio Gómez Barroche (Argentina), Cristian Gil Mosquera (Colombia), Mario Deras, Pablo Hernández, Nelson Flores, Danilo Martinez, Mario Chévez Rene Escobar, Marlon Avila, Carlos Aparicio, Alfonso Perla, and René Domingo Álvarez. The coach was Mario Martinez (El Salvador).

No goals were scored by either team in the official 90 minutes of the game. The game may have been decided on penalties but then Mario Deras entered (121) and scored (181). When Mario Deras scored twice in extra time, Vista Hermosa won the championship. This was the club's only title in the first division. The club produced players who went on to play in the El Salvador national team. They included Salvador Coreas, Leonel Guevara, and Osael Romero.

Vista Hermosa finished the 2006 – 2007 season in ninth place with 44 points and entered a repechage. It was played against Juventud Independiente in two parts. In the first game at San Juan Opico, Vista Hermosa won five points to two. In the first half, Patricio Barroche scored the first goal, Manfredi Portillo the second, Gil Mosquera the third and Patricio Barroche again the fourth. Luis Torres scored to make the score five points to nil. In the second half, the Juventud Independiente player, Carlos "Nene" Escalante scored at 53 minutes and 70 minutes. In the second game of the repechage at Estadio Municipal Luis Amilcar Moreno, Vista Hermosa's home grounds, the club defeated Juventud Independiente two points to nil. Gil Mosquera and Patricio Barroche scored one goal each for Vista Hermosa.

In the 2006 Clausura, Patricio Barroche was the player with the most goals (14).

In the 2007 Clausura, Vista Hermosa came first in the table with 44 points. The team then defeated Juventud Independiente five points to nil and two points to nil to remain in the first division. The team played an extra game against C. D. Luis Angel Firpo to define the fourth placed semi-finalist. Firpo won three points to nil. In the 2007 Apertura series, Vista Hermosa reached the semi-finals but was defeated three points to nil by Firpo.

In the 2008 Clausura, the team came fourth on the table and entered the semi-finals but was defeated by Firpo. In the 2008 Apertura series, missed out on the semi-finals by one point lost to C. D. Chalatenango.

In the 2009 Clausura series, the team finished seventh on the table. Nico Muñoz was named as the player with the most goals (10). In the 2009 Apertura series, Vista Hermosa again entered a repechage. The team played Metapan who won one point to nil. Nico Muñoz was named the player with the most goals (11).

In the 2010 Clausura, the team lost in the semi-finals to Aguila. In the 2010 Apertura series, the team reached sixth place in the table.

=== Decline and hiatus ===
During the 2011 season, the club suffered financial hardships which caused them to lose ownership of their new stadium. Three members of the owner consortium were accused of drug trafficking. The team's performance fell and after seven seasons, the club was relegated. Following this, the city of Nueva Guadalupe invested in the team, which adjusted its name to "Club Deportivo Vista Hermosa Guadalupe" for the 2012–13 Segunda División de Fútbol Salvadoreño season, based in San Miguel.

However, after one season, the mayor of Nueva Guadalupe purchased the license outright, broke all links to the original Vista Hermosa, and started a new club in Nuevo Guadalpue called C.D. Guadalupano. Vista Hermosa ceased to exist after 12 years of existence, 11 of which were played in La Primera.

C.D. Guadalupano first competed in the 2013–14 Segunda División de Fútbol Salvadoreño, but also ceased operation, in 2015.

=== Club rebirth ===
On February 26, 2017, it was announced that the new team will carry the CD Vista Hermosa name and carry on the Vista Hermosa legacy. They currently play in Liga Media/ADFA Morazan.

== Current squad ==
Note: Flags indicate national team as defined under FIFA eligibility rules; some limited exceptions apply. Players may hold more than one non-FIFA nationality.

No.	Pos.	Nation	Player
1	GK	SLV	Oscar Sanchez
2	DF	SLV	Marvin Ramos
3	DF	SLV	Cristian Marquez
4	DF	SLV	Rodel Perez Marquez
5	DF	SLV	Victor Ramos
6	DF	SLV	Luis Gonzalez
7	MF	SLV	Williams Guevara
8	MF	SLV	Dani Guevara
9	FW	SLV	Dani Guevara
10	FW	SLV	Elvin Sanchez
11	FW	SLV	Marlon Gomez

No.	Pos.	Nation	Player
17	FW	SLV	Josue Orellana
21	FW	SLV	Herberth Diaz
23	FW	SLV	Ricardo Medrano
25	GK	SLV	Cristian Rivera
27	DF	SLV	David Benitez
30	DF	SLV	Hervin Hernandez
33	DF	SLV	Michel Marquez
32	MF	SLV	Steven Portillo
35	GK	SLV	Marlon Marquez
39	FW	SLV	Balmore Vazquez

=== Players with dual citizenship ===
- (El Salvador) (United States) TBD

=== In ===
Note: Flags indicate national team as defined under FIFA eligibility rules; some limited exceptions apply. Players may hold more than one non-FIFA nationality.

No.	Pos.	Nation	Player
—		SLV	Elvelvin Argueta (From Fuerte San Francisco)
—		SLV	Luis Gabriel Sorto (From Atletico San Simon)
—		SLV	Franklin Vasquez (From Buenos Aires)
—		SLV	William Hernandez (From Buenos Aires)

No.	Pos.	Nation	Player
—		SLV	TBD (From TBD)
—		SLV	TBD (From TBD)
—		SLV	TBD (From TBD)

=== Out ===
Note: Flags indicate national team as defined under FIFA eligibility rules; some limited exceptions apply. Players may hold more than one non-FIFA nationality.

No.	Pos.	Nation	Player
—		SLV	TBD (To TBD)
—		SLV	TBD (To TBD)
—		SLV	TBD (To TBD)
—		SLV	TBD (To TBD)

No.	Pos.	Nation	Player
—		SLV	TBD (To TBD)
—		SLV	TBD (To TBD)
—		SLV	TBD (To TBD)

== Table of results (2005 – 2012) ==
Apertura 2005 – Clausura 2012

Season	Position	GP	W	D	L	GF	GA	PTS	Playoffs	Pl.	W	D	L	GS	GA	PTS
Apertura 2005	2nd	18	10	1	7	28	26	31	Champions	3	2	0	1	4	2	6
Clausura 2006	3rd	18	8	2	8	27	22	26	Semi-finals	2	0	1	1	0	1	1
Apertura 2006	8th	18	5	7	6	24	26	22	did not qualify							
Clausura 2007	8th	18	6	4	8	23	28	22	did not qualify							
Apertura 2007	5th	18	8	3	7	24	25	27	did not qualify							
Clausura 2008	4th	18	8	6	4	20	15	30	Semi-finals	2	1	0	1	1	3	3
Apertura 2008	5th	18	7	6	5	20	18	27	did not qualify							
Clausura 2009	7th	18	6	3	9	23	28	21	did not qualify							
Apertura 2009	3rd	19	7	8	4	31	21	29	Semi-finals	2	0	1	1	1	2	1
Clausura 2010	3rd	18	7	8	3	25	17	29	Semi-finals	2	0	1	1	0	1	1
Apertura 2010	6th	18	3	9	6	20	25	18	did not qualify							
Clausura 2011	7th	18	6	8	4	19	15	26	did not qualify							
Apertura 2011	10th	18	1	7	10	11	25	10	did not qualify							
Clausura 2012	10th	18	3	6	9	17	34	15	did not qualify							

== International games ==
Date	Local	VS	Visitor	Stadium	Final score
24 August 2006	(Costa Rica) Alajuelense	vs	(El Salvador) Vista Hermosa	Estadio Alejandro	5–0
30 August 2006	(El Salvador) Vista Hermosa	vs	(Costa Rica) Alajuelense	Estadio Barraza	0–0
30 August 2007	(El Salvador) Vista Hermosa	vs	(Costa Rica) Herediano	Estadio Amílcar	1–1
22 September 2010	(El Salvador) Vista Hermosa	vs	(United States) Union City	Estadio New City	1–0

== Team coaches ==
Name	From	To
(El Salvador) Silverio Hernández	1999	2002
(El Salvador) José Efraín Núñez	2003	2004
(El Salvador) Mario Martínez	2004	2007
(Argentina) Jorge Alberto García	2007	2008
(El Salvador) Víctor Coreas	2008	1 Mar 2009
(El Salvador) Armando Contreras	2 Mar 2009	12 Oct 2009
(El Salvador) Mario Martínez	13 Oct 2009	29 Nov 2010
(Argentina) Jorge Alberto García	1 Dec 2010	26 Dec 2010
(El Salvador) Víctor Coreas	27 Dec 2010	3 Nov 2011
(El Salvador) José Rolando Perez	4 Nov 2011	11 December 2011
(El Salvador) Carlos Romero	13 December 2011	5 February 2012
(El Salvador) (Honduras) José Efraín Núñez	6 February 2012	2012
(El Salvador) Hiatus	2012	2017
(El Salvador) Eduardo Lopez	2021	2022
(El Salvador) Dagoberto Sosa	January 2024	2024
(El Salvador) Oscar Amaya	2024	2025
(El Salvador) Eliseo Salamanca	June 2025	Present

== Sponsorship ==
Period	Kit manufacturer	Shirt partner
1998–1999	Mikasa	Argueta Express/La Casa del Deporte/Farmacias del Ahorro
1999–2000	Atletica	Argueta Express/La Casa del Deporte/Farmacias del Ahorro
2000–2004	Galaxia	Chavarria Express/La Casa del Deporte/Farmacias del Ahorro
2004–2005	Aviva	Medicamentos MK/La Casa del Deporte/Farmacias del Ahorro
2005–2007	Aviva	Pollo Campestre/La Casa del Deporte/Farmacias del Ahorro/Medicamentos MK/TCS
2007–2008	Aviva	TCSPailot/Tigo/Pollo Campestre
2008–2009	Aviva	TCSTigo/Sol TV/Poli Clinica limeña
2010–11	Milan Sport	Constructora Benites/Comercial Renè/Ferreteria Ferro Mundo
2011–12	Milan Sport	Cetrone Tigo/Comercial Renè/Constructora Benites
2012	Milan Sport	Mobilla Tigo/Comercial Renè/Constructora Benites
2013	Milan Sport	Alba Petroleo Tigo/Partido FMLN/Alcaldia de Nueva Guadalupe

== Records ==
=== Most appearances ===
No.	Player	Period	Appearances
1	(El Salvador) Alfonso Perla	2005–2011	200
2	(El Salvador) Manfredi Portillo	2005–2011	183
3	(El Salvador) Reynaldo Hernández	2005–2011	183
4	(El Salvador) Meme Gonzalez	2005–2008. 2009–2011	177
5	(El Salvador) Elder Figueroa	2005–2008	116
6	(El Salvador) Francisco Jovel Jr	2005–2011	115
7	(El Salvador) Osael Romero	2006–2010	115
8	(El Salvador) Noe Melgar	2005–2011	89
8	(El Salvador) Walter Soto	2005–2006, 2010–2011	71

Note: Players in italics text are banned for life due to match fixing

=== Top goalscorers ===
No.	Player	period	Goals
1	(Argentina) Patricio Barroche	2005–2007	37
2	(Colombia) Cristian Gil Mosquera	2005–2008	35
3	(El Salvador) Osael Romero	2006–2010	28
4	(Panama) Nicolás Muñoz	2009	21

Note: Number three all time team Vista Hermosa goal scorer Osael Romero left the team in 2010. A few months later, at the 2011 CONCACAF Gold Cup Group A, he participated in a match fixing scheme while playing with the El Salvador national team during a 5–0 loss to Mexico; the scheme was not discovered until 2013, when Romero (and 13 others) were banned for life.

Preceded by Clausura 2005 FAS	Primera División de Fútbol de El Salvador; Apertura 2005 (1st title)	Succeeded by Clausura 2006 Águila
