= Patricio Gómez Barroche =

Argentine footballer

Patricio Gomez Barroche
Personal information
- Full name: Patricio David Gomez Barroche
- Date of birth: 20 March 1981 (age 45)
- Place of birth: Buenos Aires, Argentina
- Height: 1.75 m (5 ft 9 in)
- Position: Forward

Youth career
- 1994–1999: Platense

Senior career*
Years	Team	Apps	(Gls)
2000–2003	Defensores de Belgrano	22	(30)
2004	Platense	11	(15)
2005	Almirante Brown	12	(22)
2005–2007	CD Vista Hermosa	60	(50)
2007–2009	CD Luis Ángel Firpo	22	(46)
2009–2010	Herediano	45	(35)
2010–2011	CD Águila	20	(47)
2011–2015	Celaya	25	(14)
2015–2016	Lobos BUAP	14	(1)

International career
1999–2001	Argentina U20		
- * Club domestic league appearances and goals

Patricio David Gomez Barroche (born 20 March 1981) is a retired Argentine footballer. He last played for the Mexican club Celaya of the Liga de Ascenso. He was born in Buenos Aires.

== Career in Argentina ==
"El Pato" began his career in the Argentine Second Division playing for Defensores de Belgrano in 2001. After a strong presents, He then moved on to play with Club Atlético Platense in 2003. In 2004, he moved on to play with Club Atlético Almirante Brown.

== Career in El Salvador ==
He arrived to El Salvador in 2005 to play with C.D. Vista Hermosa. He struggled in his first season with the club and was benched for a while. The very next season, he made his presence known in the country after scoring 13 goals in the Apertura 2006 Tournament. He moved on to play with C.D. Luis Ángel Firpo in 2007 becoming one of the biggest changes in the country and becoming champion in his first season with C.D. Luis Ángel Firpo. On July 22, 2010, Barroche signed a one-year contract with Águila.

== Naturalization rumors ==
Carlos de los Cobos made a statement that Barroche and Alejandro de la Cruz have both caught his attention and want to include them to El Salvador national team. Fans support his idea because of there individual talents and their possibilities to make the national team raise. Though, they both are not yet sure if they will accept the offer as both players look to receive a house in compensation for their talents.

== Titles ==
Season	Team	Title
Apertura 2006	C.D. Vista Hermosa	Primera División
Apertura 2007	C.D. Luis Ángel Firpo	Primera División
Clausura 2008	C.D. Luis Ángel Firpo	Primera División
