= San Francisco Gotera, Morazán =

San Francisco Gotera
- Municipality
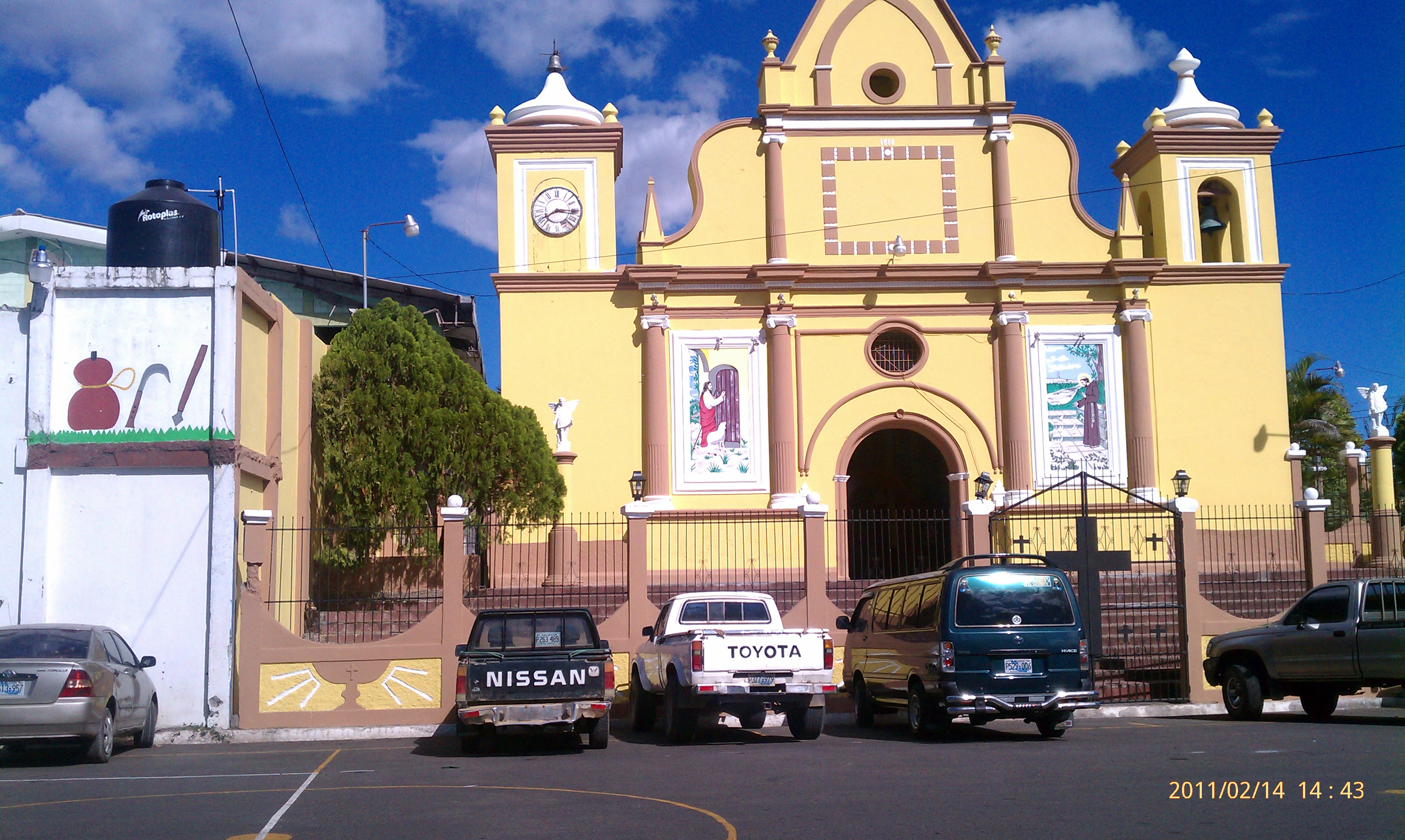
- San Francisco Gotera church

- Location in El Salvador
- Coordinates: 13°42′N 88°06′W
- Country: El Salvador
- Department: Morazán Department
- Founded: 1875

Area
  - Total: 59.76 km^{2} (23.07 sq mi)
- Elevation: 301 m (988 ft)

Population (2012)
  - Total: 21,049
  - Density: 352.2/km^{2} (912.3/sq mi)

San Francisco Gotera (Spanish pronunciation: [saɱ fɾanˈsisko ɣoˈteɾa]) is a municipality in the Morazán department of El Salvador. It is the capital of the Morazán department in El Salvador.

== Name ==
Gotera is a native word that is derived from two roots: "Got," meaning snake or serpent, and "era," meaning hill. The name has been interpreted to mean "hill of snakes." The original population of Gotera occupied the summit of the hill known as Coroban, where remains of the original population can still be found. The ancient pueblo of Gotera was renamed San Francisco after the parish of the same name. Today, the city is referred to as San Francisco Gotera, or simply Gotera.

== History ==
Because of the Salvadoran Civil War, part of the park was turned into a military base and the other part was paved. The military base sat unused for several years, but was converted into a municipal market in 2002. Today, the market is nearly empty because a larger, covered market with running water and trash pick-up was constructed in 2003 two blocks to the east of the old military base. The current military base sits on the banks of the San Francisco River.

== Today ==
Gotera is the department head and largest municipality in Morazán. The Destacamento Militar 4 (Military base no. 4) operates out of Gotera. City Hall, the oldest Catholic church in town, a defunct movie theater, the government center and the post office surround a small, paved town square. Before 1980 the square was larger and it was grassed in and had several shade trees.

== Climate ==
Climate data for San Francisco Gotera, Morazán (1991–2020)
Month	Jan	Feb	Mar	Apr	May	Jun	Jul	Aug	Sep	Oct	Nov	Dec	Year
Mean daily maximum °C (°F)	35.6 (96.1)	36.8 (98.2)	37.7 (99.9)	37.8 (100.0)	35.2 (95.4)	33.3 (91.9)	33.8 (92.8)	33.7 (92.7)	32.4 (90.3)	32.2 (90.0)	33.1 (91.6)	34.7 (94.5)	34.7 (94.5)
Daily mean °C (°F)	26.8 (80.2)	27.9 (82.2)	28.9 (84.0)	29.5 (85.1)	27.8 (82.0)	26.8 (80.2)	26.9 (80.4)	26.6 (79.9)	25.9 (78.6)	25.8 (78.4)	25.9 (78.6)	26.3 (79.3)	27.1 (80.8)
Mean daily minimum °C (°F)	19.0 (66.2)	19.7 (67.5)	21.0 (69.8)	22.5 (72.5)	22.4 (72.3)	21.9 (71.4)	21.5 (70.7)	21.6 (70.9)	21.3 (70.3)	21.3 (70.3)	19.9 (67.8)	19.1 (66.4)	20.9 (69.6)
Average precipitation mm (inches)	1.5 (0.06)	1.8 (0.07)	14.0 (0.55)	56.0 (2.20)	278.1 (10.95)	284.5 (11.20)	195.2 (7.69)	317.6 (12.50)	418.9 (16.49)	308.3 (12.14)	61.3 (2.41)	8.6 (0.34)	1,945.9 (76.61)
Average relative humidity (%)	61	59	58	62	72	77	74	77	81	80	73	65	69.8
Source: Ministerio de Medio Ambiente y Recursos Naturales

== Notable people ==
- Juan Isolino Rosa (1914-2004), composer and folklorist
