= Carlos de los Cobos =

Mexican footballer and manager (born 1958)

Personal information
- Full name: Carlos de los Cobos Martínez
- Date of birth: 10 December 1958 (age 67)
- Place of birth: Matamoros, Tamaulipas, Mexico
- Height: 1.74 m (5 ft 8 1/2 in)
- Position: Midfielder

Senior career*
Years	Team	Apps	(Gls)
1977–1978	Querétaro		
1978–1984	América	134	(7)
1984–1986	Necaxa	24	(2)
1986–1987	Cobras de Querétaro	15	(1)
1987–1989	América	23	(0)
1989–1991	Monterrey	62	(4)
1991–1992	Querétaro	34	(1)
1992–1993	Monterrey	35	(2)
1993	Querétaro	3	(0)
Total		330	(17)

International career
1983–1986	Mexico	25	(0)

Managerial career
- 1993–1994: Querétaro
- 1994–1995: Tigres UANL
- 1996: América
- 2000–2001: Celaya FC
- 2003: Irapuato
- 2006: CD FAS
- 2006–2009: El Salvador
- 2010–2011: Chicago Fire
- 2012: Querétaro FC
- 2015: Tapachula
- 2018–2021: El Salvador
- * Club domestic league appearances and goals

Carlos de los Cobos Martínez (born 10 December 1958) is a Mexican former professional football player and manager who last managed El Salvador.

== Playing career ==
As a player, de los Cobos spent the majority of his playing career in his native Mexico, playing for both Querétaro and Monterrey on numerous occasions. He represented his country at the 1986 Football World Cup held in Mexico, where he was an integral part of the team's quarter-final run. He shared team with Héctor Zelada, "El Vasco" Aguirre, Alfredo Tena, Cristóbal Ortega.

== Coaching career ==
As a coach, he has been in charge at Club América, Querétaro, Club Celaya, and Deportivo Irapuato. He served as an assistant coach to Manuel Lapuente and the Mexico national team at the 1998 Football World Cup, as well as the 1996 Olympic Games. In 2002, Mexico national team manager Ricardo La Volpe designated him as the U23 national team coach, participating in 2002 Central American and Caribbean Games held in San Salvador, El Salvador. Mexico was defeated in the final by El Salvador.

On 26 August 2006 De Los Cobos was appointed coach of the El Salvador national football team. He coached his first international tournament in the 2007 CONCACAF Gold Cup. El Salvador shared group with defending Gold Cup champions United States, Guatemala and Trinidad and Tobago. After two losses and one win, El Salvador and Trinidad and Tobago failed to advance to the quarter-finals.

In the first round of the 2010 FIFA World Cup qualification, El Salvador eliminated Anguilla with a 16–0 on aggregate and advanced to play in the second round against Panama and eliminated "Los Canaleros" by an aggregate score and advanced to the Third round. He then managed to advance El Salvador to the Hexagonal, which is the final qualifying round for CONCACAF. El Salvador had not qualified to the Hexagonal since the 1998 World Cup qualifying. On 14 December 2009, De los Cobos announced he would not continue as the manager of El Salvador after the end of his contract. He mentioned that one of his reasons for not renewing his contract was his no longer being motivated to continue with the national team.

On 8 January 2010, it was declared that de los Cobos was the new coach for the Chicago Fire. Having missed the playoffs for just the second time in club history in 2010 and sitting near the bottom of the league with a 1–4–6 record, De Los Cobos was dismissed on 30 May 2011 and replaced by Frank Klopas.

== Personal ==
De los Cobos and his wife Mayte have two children: Rafael and Paulina.

== Honours ==
América

- Mexican Primera División: 1983–84, 1987–88, 1988–89
- Campeón de Campeones: 1988
