= 2024–25 Primera División de El Salvador =

Primera División tournament

Primera División de El Salvador
- Season: 2024–25
- Dates: 27 July 2024 – 21 December 2024 (Apertura), 18 January 2025 – 24 May 2025 (Clausura)
- Champions: Once Deportivo (2024 Apertura); Alianza (2025 Clausura)
- CONCACAF Central American Cup: Once Deportivo
- CONCACAF Central American Cup: Alianza
- CONCACAF Central American Cup: Aguila
- Matches: 94
- Goals: 225 (2.39 per match)
- Top goalscorer: (Brazil) Gustavo Moura (14 goals Apertura 2024) (Colombia) Jonathan Urrutia (9 goals Clausura 2025)
- Highest scoring: FAS 3-4 Águila
- All statistics correct as of 11 May 2025.

The 2024–25 Primera División de El Salvador, also known as the Liga Pepsi, was the 26th season and 50th and 51st Primera División tournament, El Salvador's top football division, since its establishment of an Apertura and Clausura format. Aguila and Alianza are the defending champions of the Apertura and Clausura tournament respectively. The league will consist of 11 teams. There will be two seasons conducted under identical rules, with each team playing a home and away game against the other clubs for a total of 20 games per tournament. At the end of each half-season tournament, the top six teams in that tournament's regular season standings will take part in the playoffs.

The champions of Apertura and Clausura will qualify for the CONCACAF Central American Cup, the third team to qualify is the team with better aggregate record. Should the same team win both tournaments, both runners-up will qualify for CONCACAF Central American Cup. Should the final of both tournaments features the same two teams, the semi-finalist with the better aggregate record will qualify for CONCACAF Central American Cup.

== Teams ==
=== Promotion and relegation ===
A total of 11 teams will contest the league, including 10 sides from the 2023–24 Primera División and 1 promoted from the 2023–24 Segunda División.

Cacahuatique was promoted to the Primera División on July 1, 2024, after defeating Titan in a playoff match by a score of 4–3 in penalties, after the team were tied 1–1 after 120 minutes.

Santa Tecla was relegated to the 2024–25 Segunda División.

Jocoro withdrew from the league.

== Notable events ==
=== Changes for 2024-2025 Season ===
On the 13th of June, 2024 The President of the Primera Division Samuel Gálvez announced changes for the Apertura 2024 and Clausura 2025 included the final being played over two legs instead just one game, the finals will be held at the finalist stadiums. The four foreign players quota will remain. One reserve or under 17 player must be played for 90 minutes per game.

=== Jocoro sold spot in primera division to Titan ===
It was announced on July 13, 2024, that Titan had made agreement with Jocoro to acquire their spot in the Primera division.

=== Primera division denys Joroco selling of spot, Only 11 teams will participate ===
FESFUT announced with Jocoro failure to meet the requirement to register in the Primera Division, they would lose their spot and therefore could sell their spot to Titan. Despite protest and pleas from Titan board to be allowed to take the spot and give a slight extension to the club for meet the requirement, on June 18, 2024, FESFUT President Humberto Sáenz Marinero announced the league will proceed with only 11 teams.

=== FESFUT denied double legged final ===
On 29 September, it was announced by FESFUT that they had denied primera division decision to have two legged grand final, the grand final will remain one legged final.

=== Announcement no team will be relegated 2024–2025 season ===
On 24 October 2024 it was announced by the primera division that no team will be relegated for the 2024–2025, after Jocoro FC license being suspended, and only 11 teams participating in the league, the league stated that one team will be promoted to make it even 12 teams again and no team will be relegated.

=== Grand Final to be played at Estadio Jorge "Mágico" González ===
On December 3, 2024, It was announced that the final will be playing in the Estadio Jorge "Mágico" González for the first time since 2004.

=== FEFSUT announces the banning of multi-club ownership ===
On April 30, 2025, FESFUT announced the banning of multi-club ownership.

=== Notable death from Apertura 2024 season and 2025 Clausura season ===
The following people associated with the Primera Division have died between the middle of 2024 and middle of 2025.

- Manuel Ayala (ex Luis Angel Firpo player)
- Joel Estrada (ex FAS player)
- Jose Leandro Linares (ex FAS and Gatos de Monterrey player)
- Juan Ramon Martinez (ex Aguila, Atletico Marte, Juventud Olimpica and Once Municipal player)
- Eder Renderos (ex Luis Angel Firpo, UES and Audaz player)
- Julio Leiva (Guatemalan ex Aguila player)
- Amadeo Machado (ex Aguila and Luis Angel Firpo player)
- Domingo Albil (Argentinian ex FAS, Alianza and Sonsonate player)
- Héctor Alcides Piccioni (Argentinian ex FAS player)
- Luis Ernesto Tapia (Panamanian ex Alianza, Atletico Marte, UES and Juventud Olimpica player)
- Gerson Menjívar (ex Atletico Marte player)
- Óscar "Chino" Portillo (ex Dragon Player)
- Amilcar Humana (ex Aguila and Dragon Player)
- Manuel Antonio Solis Chinito (ex FAS player)
- Norberto Huezo (ex UES, ANTEL, Atletico Marte, Cojutepeque, FAS)
- Armando Osma Rueda (Colombian ex Aguila coach)
- Ovido Mendez (ex Luis Angel Firpo player)

== Managerial changes ==
=== Before the start of the season ===
Team	Outgoing manager	Manner of departure	Date of vacancy	Replaced by	Date of appointment	Position in table
Aguila	(Argentina) Ernesto Corti	Contract finished,	May 27, 2024	(Argentina) Daniel Messina	May 27, 2024	4th and Quarterfinalist (2024 Clausura)
Fuerte San Francisco	(El Salvador) Nelson Ancheta	Contract Finished	May 27, 2024	(Mexico) Jorge Martinez Merino	June 29, 2024	11th (2024 Clausura)
Dragon	(El Salvador) Manuel Acevedo	Mutual Consent	June 7, 2024	(El Salvador) Marvin Benítez	June 7, 2024	9th (2024 Clausura)
Isidro Metapan	(Argentina) Carlos Martinez Che	Returned to assistant coach role	June 18, 2024	(El Salvador) Hector Omar Mejia	July 3, 2024	7th and Semi-Finalist (2024 Clausura)
Cacahuatique	(Uruguay) Pablo Quiñones	Mutual Consent	July 4, 2024	(Argentina) Daniel Corti	July 9, 2024	None (2024 Clausura)

=== During the Apertura season ===
Team	Outgoing manager	Manner of departure	Date of vacancy	Replaced by	Date of appointment	Position in table
FAS	(Uruguay) Ricardo Preza	Sacked	August 20, 2024	(Peru) Agustin Castillo	August 20, 2024	7th (2024 Apertura)
Municipal Limeno	(El Salvador) William Renderos Iraheta	Sacked	September 19, 2024	(El Salvador) Abel Flores (Interim)	September 20, 2024	7th (2024 Apertura)
Dragon	(El Salvador) Marvin Benítez	Resigned	September, 2024	(Uruguay) Pablo Quiñones	September, 2024	12th (2024 Apertura)
Municipal Limeno	(El Salvador) Abel Flores (Interim)	Interimship ended	October 5, 2024	(El Salvador) Guillermo Rivera	October 5, 2024	6th (2024 Apertura)
Platense	(El Salvador) Jorge Abrego	Mutual Consent	October 11, 2024	(El Salvador) David Hernández (Interim)	October 11, 2024	11th (2024 Apertura)
Fuerte San Francisco	(Mexico) Jorge Merino	Mutual Consent	October 16, 2024	(Uruguay) Ruben Alonso	October 18, 2024	9th (2024 Apertura)

=== Between the Apertura and Clausura season ===
Team	Outgoing manager	Manner of departure	Date of vacancy	Replaced by	Date of appointment	Position in table
Alianza	(El Salvador) Jorge Rodríguez	Contract finished and did not renew	December 12, 2024	(Argentina) Ernesto Corti	December 15, 2024	5th (2024 Apertura)
Municipal Limeno	(El Salvador) Guillermo Rivera	Contract finished and not renewed	December 23, 2024	(El Salvador) Jose Romero	December 23, 2024	7th (2024 Apertura)
Once Deportivo	(El Salvador) Erick Prado	End of contract	December 28, 2025	(Argentina) Fabio Larramendi	January 7, 2025	5th & Champion (2024 Apertura)
Isidro Metapan	(El Salvador) Hector Mejia	Contract Finished	December 4, 2025	(El Salvador) Erick Prado	January 4, 2025	5th (2024 Apertura)

=== Clausura seasons ===
Team	Outgoing manager	Manner of departure	Date of vacancy	Replaced by	Date of appointment	Position in table
FAS	(Peru) Agustin Castillo	Sacked	February 24, 2025	(Spain) David Caneda (Interim)	February 24, 2025	8th (2025 Clausura)
Once Deportivo	(Argentina) Fabio Larramendi	Sacked	March 11, 2025	(El Salvador) Guillermo Rivera	March 12, 2025	11th (2025 Clausura)
Cacahuatique	(Argentina) Daniel Corti	Sacked	March 25, 2025	(El Salvador) Victor Coreas	March 26, 2025	6th (2025 Clausura)
Dragon	(Uruguay) Pablo Quiñones	Sacked	March 27, 2025	(El Salvador) Manuel Meme Gonzalez (Interim)	March 27, 2025	9th (2025 Clausura)
Fuerte San Francisco	(Uruguay) Ruben Alonso	Sacked	April 19, 2025	(El Salvador) Rolando Torres (Interim)	April 21, 2025	9th (2025 Clausura)

== Apertura ==
=== League table ===
Pos	Team	Pld	W	D	L	GF	GA	GD	Pts	Qualification or relegation
1	Águila	20	12	5	3	36	18	+18	41	Advance to Playoffs
2	Cacahuatique	20	13	1	6	24	16	+8	40	Advance to Playoffs
3	Luis Ángel Firpo	20	12	3	5	32	28	+4	39	Advance to Playoffs
4	Isidro Metapán	20	10	5	5	31	21	+10	35	Advance to Playoffs
5	Alianza	20	9	5	6	26	16	+10	32	Advance to Playoffs
6	Once Deportivo	20	9	5	6	26	23	+3	32	Advance to Playoffs
7	Municipal Limeño	20	7	6	7	24	22	+2	27	Advance to Playoffs
8	FAS	20	6	5	9	29	28	+1	23	Advance to Playoffs
9	Fuerte San Francisco	20	4	3	13	15	34	−19	15	
10	Dragón	20	3	4	13	10	30	−20	13	
11	Platense	20	1	6	13	11	28	−17	9	

Source: Soccerway
Rules for classification: 1) points; 2) goal difference; 3) number of goals scored.

=== Apertura 2024 Records ===
==== Records ====
- Best home records: TBD (00 points out of 33 points)
- Worst home records: TBD (00 points out of 33 points)
- Best away records : TBD (00 points out of 33 points)
- Worst away records : TBD (00 points out of 33 points)
- Most goals scored: TBD (00 goals)
- Fewest goals scored: TBD (00 goals)
- Fewest goals conceded : TBD (00 goals)
- Most goals conceded : TBD (00 goals)

=== Scoring ===
- First goal of the season: (Brazil) Gustavo Souza for Firpo against Platense, 6 minutes (Month day, 2024)
- First goal by a foreign player: (Brazil) Gustavo Souza for Firpo against Platense, 6th minutes (A, 2024)
- Fastest goal in a match: 5 Minutes
  - (El Salvador) Luis Enrique Vasquez for Once Deportivo against Platense (August 2, 2024)
- Goal scored at the latest goal in a match: 94 minutes
  - (El Salvador) TBD goal for TBD against TBD (Month day, 2024)
- First penalty Kick of the season: (Colombia) Julian Grueso for Cacahuatique against Firpo, 43rd minutes (August 4, 2024)
- Widest winning margin: 4 goals
  - TBD 5–1 TBD (August 20, 2023)
- First hat-trick of the season: (Uruguay) Emiliano Villar for FAS against Alianza (November 16, 2024)
- First own goal of the season: (El Salvador) Ronald Aparicio (Platense) for Aguila (August 26, 2024)
- Most goals in a match: 7 goals
  - FAS 3-4 Aguila (October 20, 2024)
- Most goals by one team in a match: 5 goals
  - TBD 5-3 TBD (Month day, 2024)
- Most goals in one half by one team: 4 goals
  - TBD 5-0 (5–3) TBD (1st half, Month day, 2024)
- Most goals scored by losing team: 3 goals
  - FAS 3-4 Aguila (October 20, 2024)
- Most goals by one player in a single match: 4 goals
  - (Uruguay) Emiliano Villar for FAS against Alianza (November 16, 2024)
- Players that scored a hat-trick':
  - (Uruguay) Emiliano Villar for FAS against Alianza (November 16, 2024)

==== Top Goalscorer (Apertura 2024) ====
No.	Player	Club	Goals
1	(Brazil) Gustavo Moura	LA Firpo	14
2	(Uruguay) Emiliano Villar	FAS	11
3	(El Salvador) Emerson Mauricio	Alianza	9
4	(El Salvador) Alexander Marquez	Cacahuatique	8
5	(Argentina) Blas Sosa	Aguila	8
6	(Mexico) Yair Delgadillo	Isidro Metapan	7
7	(El Salvador) Mauricio Cerritos	LA Firpo	6
8	(El Salvador) Javier Ferman	Municipal Limeno	6
9	(El Salvador) Steven Guerra	Isidro Metapan	6
10	(El Salvador) Juan Carlos Argueta	Isidro Metapan	5
10	(El Salvador) Isaac Esquivel	Isidro Metapan	5

=== Playoff ===
==== Quarterfinals ====
===== First legs =====
4 December 2024
19:30 (UTC-6)

Once Deportivo	2-1	LA Firpo
Carlos Anzora (pen.), 11'; Kemal Malcolm 72'		Alberto Henríquez 35'

Estadio Cuscatlan, San Salvador
Referee: TBD
4 December 2024
15:30 (UTC-6)

FAS	1-1	Aguila
Rafael Tejeda 53'		Edgar Medrano 92'

Estadio Óscar Quiteño, Santa Ana
Referee: Juan Francisco Quinteros
5 December 2024
20:00 (UTC-6)

Alianza	1-1	Isidro Metapan
Ányelo Rodríguez (pen.), 6'		Isaac Esquivel 87'

Estadio Cuscatlan, San Salvador
Referee: TBD
5 December 2024
18:00 (UTC-6)

Municipal Limeno	0-1	Cacahuatique
Nil		Jorge Lara 38'

Estadio Jose Ramon Flores, Santa Rosa de Lima, La Union
Referee: TBD

===== Second legs =====
7 December 2024
20:00 (UTC-6)

Isidro Metapan	0-0	Alianza
Nil		Nil

Estadio Jorge Calero Suárez, Metapan

1-1. Isidro Metapan won 5-3 on penalties

8 December 2024
15:00 (UTC-6)

LA Firpo	0-1	Once Deportivo
Styven Vasquez 42'		Josue Rivera 16'

Estadio Sergio Torres, Usulutan

Once Deportivo won 3-2 on Aggregate

8 December 2024
15:00 (UTC-6)

Aguila	0-1	FAS
Nil		Rafael Tejeda 87'

Estadio Cuscatlan, San Salvador

FAS won 2-1 on Aggregate

8 December 2024
15:00 (UTC-6)

Cacahuatique	0-1	Municipal Limeno
Nil		Bryan Paz 9'

Complejo Deportivo de Chapeltique, San Miguel

1-1. Cacahuatique won 3-1 on penalties

==== Semi-finals ====
===== First legs =====
11 December 2024
20:00 (UTC-6)

FAS	2-1	Isidro Metapan
Emiliano Villar 35'; Jonathan Nolasco 68'		Roberto Domínguez 45'

Estadio Óscar Quiteño, Santa Ana
12 December 2024
15:30 (UTC-6)

Once Deportivo	1-1	Cacahuatique
Kemal Malcolm 58'		Wilker da Silva 19'

Estadio Simeón Magaña, Ahuachapan

===== Second legs =====
14 December 2024
19:00 (UTC-6)

Isidro Metapan	0-0	FAS
Nil		Nil

Estadio Jorge Calero Suárez, Metapan
Referee: TBD

FAS won 2-1 on aggregate

15 December 2024
14:45 (UTC-6)

Cacahuatique	1-1	Once Deportivo
Kelvin Hernandez 36'		Miguel Murillo 20'

Complejo Deportivo de Chapeltique, San Miguel
Referee: TBD

2-2. Once Deportivo won 5-3 on penalties

==== Final ====
December 21, 2024
18:00 UTC−6
Final

FAS	1-2	Once Deportivo
Bryan Ríos 51'		Josue Rivera 64'; Jomal Williams 95'

Estadio Jorge Magico Gonzalez, San Salvador
Attendance: TBD
Referee: Juan Francisco Quinteros

FAS
GK	1	(El Salvador) Kevin Carabantes
DF	30	(Uruguay) Mathias Goyeni	Substituted off
DF	4	(El Salvador) Edson Melendez
DF	22	(El Salvador) Bryan Tamacas	Substituted off
DF	28	(El Salvador) Rudy Clavel	Yellow card
MF	8	(El Salvador) Jonathan Nolasco	Substituted off
MF	5	(El Salvador) Jose Portillo	Yellow card
MF	29	(El Salvador) Rodrigo Rivera	Substituted off
FW	7	(El Salvador) Rafael Tejada
FW	26	(Uruguay) Emiliano Villar
FW	39	(El Salvador) Bryan Rios	(substituted off) (goal) 35'
Substitutes:
MF	2	(El Salvador) Jose Guevara		Substituted on
MF	14	(El Salvador) Emerson Rivas		Substituted on
DF	19	(Uruguay) Martin Correra		Substituted on
DF	57	(El Salvador) Samuel Rosales		Substituted on
FW	9	(Argentina) German Aguila		Substituted on
Manager:
(Peru) Agustin Castillo

Once Deportivo
GK	1	(El Salvador) Gerson Lopez	(substituted off) 44'
DF	3	(Colombia) Miguel Murillo	Substituted off
DF	4	(El Salvador) Diego Chavez
DF	29	(El Salvador) Jorge Cruz
DF	5	(El Salvador) Carlos Anzora
MF	8	(El Salvador) Cesar Flores
MF	10	(Trinidad and Tobago) Jomal Williams	95'
MF	12	(El Salvador) Angel Ortega	Substituted off
MF	17	(El Salvador) Eduardo Gonzalez	Substituted off
MF	32	(El Salvador) Julio Paulino	Substituted off
FW	26	(El Salvador) Josue Rivera	64'
Substitutes:
GK	51	(El Salvador) Cesar Melara		(substituted on) 44'
MF	'22	(El Salvador) Giovanni Avila		Substituted on
MF	6	(El Salvador) Efrain Carcamo		Substituted on
DF	19	(El Salvador) Luis Vasquez	Substituted on
DF	11	(Jamaica) Kemal Malcolm	Substituted on
Manager:
(El Salvador) Erick Prado

Apertura 2024 champions

1st title

== Clausura ==
=== League table ===
Pos	Team	Pld	W	D	L	GF	GA	GD	Pts	Qualification or relegation
1	Águila	20	13	4	3	37	17	+20	43	Advance to Playoffs
2	Luis Ángel Firpo	20	11	6	3	34	16	+18	39	Advance to Playoffs
3	Alianza	20	12	3	5	28	11	+17	39	Advance to Playoffs
4	Isidro Metapán	20	9	8	3	22	13	+9	35	Advance to Playoffs
5	Municipal Limeño	20	6	9	5	21	20	+1	27	Advance to Playoffs
6	Cacahuatique	20	6	9	5	18	24	−6	27	Advance to Playoffs
7	Fuerte San Francisco	20	6	6	8	15	20	−5	24	Advance to Playoffs
8	FAS	20	5	7	8	17	23	−6	22	Advance to Playoffs
9	Platense	20	5	5	10	18	25	−7	20	
10	Dragón	20	4	2	14	17	30	−13	14	
11	Once Deportivo	20	1	5	14	12	40	−28	8	

Updated to match(es) played on 20 April 2025. Source: Soccerway
Rules for classification: 1) points; 2) goal difference; 3) number of goals scored.

=== Clausura 2025 Records ===
==== Records ====
- Best home records: TBD (00 points out of 33 points)
- Worst home records: TBD (00 points out of 33 points)
- Best away records : TBD (00 points out of 33 points)
- Worst away records : TBD (00 points out of 33 points)
- Most goals scored: Aguila (37 goals)
- Fewest goals scored: Once Deportivo (12 goals)
- Fewest goals conceded : Alianza (11 goals)
- Most goals conceded : Once Deportivo (40 goals)

=== Scoring ===
- First goal of the season: (Colombia) Carlos Salazar for Alianza against Limeno, 46 minutes (January 19, 2025)
- First goal by a foreign player: (Colombia) Carlos Salazar for Alianza against Limeno, 46 minutes (January 19, 2025)
- Fastest goal in a match: 27 Seconds
  - (El Salvador) Edgar Valladares for Platense against Aguila (January 26, 2025)
- Goal scored at the latest goal in a match: 93 minutes
  - (El Salvador) Dixon Rivas goal for Aguila against Isidro Metapan (February 26, 2025)
- First penalty Kick of the season: (El Salvador) Bryan Paz for Platense against LA Firpo, 20th minutes (January 20, 2025)
- Widest winning margin: 4 goals
  - Dragon 4-0 Once Deportivo (February 16, 2025)
- First hat-trick of the season: (El Salvador) Styven Vasquez for LA Firpo against Once Deportivo (February 26, 2025)
- First own goal of the season: (El Salvador) Diego Chevez (Cacahuatique) for Aguila (March 16, 2025)
- Most goals in a match: 6 goals
  - Aguila 4-2 Cacahuatique (, 2025)
- Most goals by one team in a match: 4 goals
  - Alianza 4-0 Cacahuatique (March 24, 2025)
    Dragon 4-0 Once Deportivo (February 16, 2025)
    Dragon 4-0 Cacahuatique (2025)
- Most goals in one half by one team: 4 goals
  - Alianza 4-1 Limeno (2nd half, January 19, 2025)
- Most goals scored by losing team: 2 goals
  - Platense 2-3 Limeno (, 2025)
    Dragon 2-3 Isidro Metapan (, 2025)
    Cacahuatique 2-4 Aguila (March 16, 2025)
- Most goals by one player in a single match: 3 goals
  - (El Salvador) Styven Vasquez for LA Firpo against Once Deportivo (February 26, 2025)
  - (El Salvador) Rafael Tejada for FAS against Platense (March 8, 2025)
  - (Colombia) Carlos Salazar for Alianza against Cacahuatique (March 23, 2025)
- Players that scored a hat-trick':
  - (El Salvador) Styven Vasquez for LA Firpo against Once Deportivo (February 26, 2025)
  - (El Salvador) Rafael Tejada for FAS against Platense (March 8, 2025)
  - (Colombia) Carlos Salazar for Alianza against Cacahuatique (March 23, 2025)

==== Top Goalscorer (Clausura 2025) ====
No.	Player	Club	Goals
1	(Colombia) Jonathan Urrutia	Platense	9
2	(El Salvador) Styven Vasquez	LA Firpo	8
3	(Colombia) Carlos Salazar	Alianza	6
4	(Argentina) Blas Sosa	Aguila	6
5	(Colombia) Edgar Medrano	FAS	6
6	(Chile) Sebastian Julio	Municipal Limeno	5
7	(El Salvador) Rafael Tejada	FAS	5
8	(Colombia) Michell Mercado	Alianza	5
9	(Colombia) Andres Bello	Platense	5
10	(El Salvador) Emerson Mauricio	Alianza	4

=== Playoff ===
==== Quarterfinals ====
===== First legs =====
7 May 2025
15:00 (UTC-6)

Cacahuatique	1-2	Alianza
Jorge Lara 83'		Emerson Mauricio 47'; Carlos Salazar 78'

Complejo Deportivo de Chapeltique, San Miguel
Referee: César Nolasco

7 May 2025
19:30 (UTC-6)

Municipal Limeno	2-1	Isidro Metapan
Sebastian Julio 12'; Jefferson Martinez 56'		Josue Rivera 22'

Estadio Jose Ramon Flores, Santa Rosa de Lima, La Union

7 May 2025
20:00 (UTC-6)

FAS	1-2	Aguila
Rafael Tejada (pen.), 38'		Dixon Rivas 49'; Ricardo Villatoro 88'

Estadio Óscar Quiteño, Santa Ana
Referee: TBD

8 May 2025
18:00 (UTC-6)

Fuerte San Francisco	0-0	LA Firpo
Nil		Nil

Estadio Correcaminos, Morazan
Referee: TBD

===== Second legs =====
10 May 2024
20:15 (UTC-6)

Isidro Metapan	1-2	Municipal Limeno
Roberto Dominguez 95'		Miguel Lemus , 68' (o.g.); Sebastián Julio 70'

Estadio Jorge Calero Suárez, Metapan

Municipal Limeno won 4-2 on Aggregate

10 May 2025
15:00 (UTC-6)

Alianza	4-0	Cacahuatique
Narciso Orellana 5'; Michell Mercado 31'; Leonardo Menjivar 47'; Emerson Mauricio 59'		Nil

Estadio Cuscatlan, San Salvador

Alianza won 6-1 on Aggregate

10 May 2025
15:00 (UTC-6)

LA Firpo	1-1	Fuerte San Francisco
Brayan Landaverde 69'		Diego Ortez 29'

Estadio Sergio Torres, Usulutan

1-1. Fuerte San Francisco won 4-3 on penalties

11 May 2025
15:15 (UTC-6)

Aguila	0-1	FAS
Nil		Edgar Medrano 70'

Estadio Cuscatlan, San Salvador

1-1. FAS won 4-3 on penalties

==== Semifinals ====
===== First legs =====
14 May 2025
19:30 (UTC-6)

FAS	1-2	Limeno
Edgar Medrano 59'		Marvin Ramos 11'; Elmer Bonilla 86'

Estadio Oscar Quiteno, Santa Ana

15 May 2025
15:30 (UTC-6)

Fuerte San Francisco	0-1	Alianza
Nil		Leonardo Menjivar 54'

Estadio Correcaminos, San Francisco Gotera, El Salvador
Referee: TBD

===== Second legs =====
17 May 2025
18:30 (UTC-6)

Limeno	1-0	FAS
Marvin Ramos 66'		Nil

Estadio Jose Ramon Flores, Santa Rosa de Lima, La Union

Municipal Limeno won 3-1 on Aggregate

18 May 2025
17:00 (UTC-6)

Alianza	2-0	Fuerte San Francisco
Emerson Mauricio 59'; Michell Mercado 62'		Nil

Estadio Jorge "El Mágico" González, San Salvador

Alianza won 3-0 on Aggregate

==== Final ====
May 24, 2025
18:00 UTC−6
Final

Limeno	0-0	Alianza
Nil		Nil
Penalties
Marvin Ramos (penalty scored); Gerson Mayen (penalty missed); Jefferson Valladares (penalty scored); Jordy Bonilla (penalty scored); Javier Ferman (penalty missed)	3-4	Carlos Salazar (penalty missed); (penalty scored) Julian Gruseo; (penalty scored) Anyelo Rodriguez; (penalty scored) Juan Barahona; (penalty scored) Henry Romero

Estadio Jorge Magico Gonzalez, San Salvador, Estadio Jorge Magico Gonzalez, San Salvador
Attendance: TBD
Referee: Ivan Barton

Limeno
GK	TBD	(Mexico) Joel Almeida	(yellow card) 90'
DF	TBD	(El Salvador) Ruben Marroquin	(substituted off) 121'
DF	TBD	(El Salvador) Elvis Claros	(yellow card) 23'
DF	TBD	(El Salvador) Fredy Espinoza	(yellow card) 74'
DF	TBD	(El Salvador) Danis Cruz	(substituted off) 81'
MF	TBD	(El Salvador) Elmer Bonilla	(substituted off) 81'
MF	TBD	(El Salvador) Marvin Ramos
MF	TBD	(El Salvador) Gerson Mayen	(yellow card) 48'
MF	TBD	(El Salvador) Jefferson Valladares
MF	TBD	(El Salvador) Jefferson Martinez	(yellow card) 63' (substituted off) 91'
FW	TBD	(Chile) Sebastian Julio	(substituted off) 63'
Substitutes:
MF	'TBD	(El Salvador) Javier Ferman		(substituted on) 63'
MF	TBD	(Paraguay) Nico Gonzalez		(substituted on) 81' (yellow card)
DF	TBD	(El Salvador) Santos Rivera	(substituted on) 81'
DF	TBD	(El Salvador) William Molina	(substituted on) 91'
DF	TBD	(El Salvador) Jordy Bonilla		(substituted on) 121'
Manager:
(El Salvador) Jose Romero

Alianza
GK	TBD	(El Salvador) Mario González
DF	TBD	(El Salvador) William Canales	(substituted off) 101' (yellow card) 99'
DF	TBD	(El Salvador) Henry Romero
DF	TBD	(Colombia) Julian Grueso
DF	TBD	(El Salvador) Alejandro Henriquez
MF	TBD	(Uruguay) Ányelo Rodríguez
MF	TBD	(El Salvador) Narciso Orellana	(yellow card) 20' 40
MF	TBD	(El Salvador) Christopher Guardado
MF	TBD	(El Salvador) Leonardo Menjivar	(yellow card) 49' (substituted off) 51'
MF	TBD	(Colombia) Michell Mercado
FW	TBD	(El Salvador) Emerson Mauricio	(substituted off) 121'
Substitutes:
MF	'TBD	(El Salvador) Andres Hernandez		(substituted on) 51'
MF	TBD	(El Salvador) Jonathan Jiménez		(substituted on) 101' (substituted off) 121'
DF	TBD	(El Salvador) Juan Barahona	(substituted on) 112'
FW	TBD	(Colombia) Carlos Salazar	(substituted on) 112'
Manager:
(Argentina) Ernesto Corti

Clausura 2025 champions

19th title

== List of foreign players in the league ==
This is a list of foreign players in the 2024–25 season. The following players:

1. Have played at least one game for the respective club.
2. Have not been capped for the El Salvador national football team on any level, independently from the birthplace

A new rule was introduced this season, that clubs can have four foreign players per club and can only add a new player if there is an injury or a player is released and it is before the close of the season transfer window.

Águila

- (Argentina) Gonzalo Ramirez
- (Argentina) Blas Sosa
- (Argentina) Nicolás Femia
- (Brazil) Dionatan Machado
- (Colombia) Carlos Salazar
- (Colombia) Edgar Medrano
- (Spain) Diego Gregori

Alianza

- (Colombia) Mitchel Mercado
- (Chile) Sebastián Julio
- (Uruguay) Ányelo Rodríguez
- (Uruguay) Anthony Sosa
- (Argentina) Ramiro Rocca
- (Colombia) Carlos Salazar
- (Colombia) Julián Grueso

Cachuatique

- (Argentina) Elías Umeres
- (Argentina) Germán Aguila
- (Brazil) Wilker da Silva
- (Colombia) Julián Grueso
- (Colombia) Jorge Lara
- (Colombia) Yerson Tobar

Dragon

- (Colombia) Yair Arboleda
- (Colombia) Kevin Moreno
- (Colombia) Manuel Chala
- (Colombia) Yerson Tobar
- (Colombia) Samuel Campaña
- (Colombia) José Miguel Medrano
- (Argentina) Gonzalo Ramirez
- (Argentina) Kevin Telmo Smaldone
- (Paraguay) Tobias Quintana

FAS

- (Argentina) Germán Aguila
- (Colombia) Edgar Medrano
- (Brazil) Elcarlos Junior
- (Uruguay) Martin Correra
- (Uruguay) Mathias Goyeni
- (Uruguay) Emiliano Villar
- (Colombia) Jorge Ramos

Firpo

- (Argentina) Marcelo Argüello
- (Colombia) Wilber Arizala
- (Brazil) Guilherme Silva
- (Brazil) Jonathan Santana
- (Brazil) Gustavo Souza

Fuerte San Francisco

- (Argentina) Luis Acuña
- (Colombia) Camilo Delgado
- (Colombia) Andres Murillo Rentería
- (Jamaica) Colorado Murray
- (Ecuador) Yosimar Rodríguez
- (Brazil) Gabriel Negueba
- (Brazil) Wilker da Silva

Isidro Metapán

- (Argentina) Luca Orozco
- (Ecuador) Javier Cetre
- (Spain) Diego Gregori
- (Mexico) Yair Delgadillo
- (Colombia) Juan Mosquera
- (Colombia) David Livingston

Municipal Limeno

- (Brazil) Lucas dos Santos
- (Colombia) Juan Diego Lasso
- (Honduras) German Mejia
- (Mexico) Joel Almeida
- (Mexico) Aldo Magaña
- (Chile) Sebastián Julio
- (Paraguay) Nico González

Once Deportivo

- (Colombia) Manuel Murrillo
- (Cuba) Kevin Martin
- (Jamaica) Kemal Malcolm
- (Trinidad and Tobago) Jomal Williams

Platense

- (Brazil) Matheus da Silva
- (Brazil) Magno Costa Fernandes
- (Colombia) Argenis Alba
- (Paraguay) Sandro Melgarejo
- (Colombia) Nayan Andrés Bello
- (Colombia) Jhonathon Urrutia
- (Colombia) Julian Silvestre

(player released beginning the Apertura season, Never played a game) (player released during the Apertura season) (player released between the Apertura and Clausura seasons) (player released during the Clausura season) (Injured and ruled out for the rest of the season) (player naturalized for the Clausura season) (player released beginning the Clausura season, Never played a game)
