= 2023–24 Primera División de El Salvador =

Primera División tournament

Primera División de El Salvador
- Season: 2023–24
- Dates: August 2023 – December 2023 (Apertura), 2024 – 29 May 2024 (Clausura)
- Champions: Aguila (Apertura 2023); Alianza (Clausura 2024)
- Relegated: Santa Tecla
- CONCACAF Central American Cup: Aguila
- CONCACAF Central American Cup: LA Firpo
- CONCACAF Central American Cup: Alianza
- Top goalscorer: (Colombia) Carlos Salazar (15 goals Apertura 2023) (El Salvador) Styven Vásquez (15 goals Clausura 2024)
- Best goalkeeper: Mario Gonzalez (Apertura 2023) (El Salvador) Mario Gonzalez (Clausura 2024)
- All statistics correct as of 27 May 2023.

The 2023–24 Primera División de El Salvador, also known as the Liga Pepsi, was the 25th season and 48th and 49th Primera División tournament, El Salvador's top football division, since its establishment of an Apertura and Clausura format. FAS are the defending champions of the Apertura tournament. There was no Clausura champion as the season was cancelled due to Cuscatlan Tragedy. The league will consist of 12 teams. There will be two seasons conducted under identical rules, with each team playing a home and away game against the other clubs for a total of 22 games per tournament. At the end of each half-season tournament, the top six teams in that tournament's regular season standings will take part in the playoffs.

The champions of Apertura and Clausura will qualify for the CONCACAF Central American Cup, the third team to qualify is the team with better aggregate record. Should the same team win both tournaments, both runners-up will qualify for CONCACAF Central American Cup. Should the final of both tournaments features the same two teams, the semi-finalist with the better aggregate record will qualify for CONCACAF Central American Cup.

== Teams ==
=== Promotion and relegation ===
A total of 12 teams will contest the league, including 11 sides from the 2022–23 Primera División and 1 promoted from the 2022–23 Segunda División.

Fuerte San Francisco was promoted to the Primera División on June 25, 2023, after defeating Titan in a playoff match by a score of 3–0 in penalties, after the team were tied 0–0 after 120 minutes.

Chalatenango was relegated to the 2023–24 Segunda División.

== Notable events ==
=== Municipal Limeno purchase of Atletico Marte spot in the Primera Division ===
On the 26th of June, 2023 Municipal Limeño acquired the spot of the historic team Atletico Marte in the Primera division. This ended 3 years of Atletico Marte being in the Primera division.

=== Notable death from Apertura 2023 season and 2024 Clausura season ===
The following people associated with the Primera Division have died between the middle of 2022 and middle of 2023.

- Jorge Roldán (ex Guatemalan Once Municipal and Platense coach)
- José Sulantay (ex Chilean UES and Atletico Marte player)
- Joaquin Santana Palma (ex Sonsonate and Juventud Olimpico Metalio player)
- Juan Jose Polio (Ex Aguila player)
- Hernán Carrasco (ex Chilean Alianza, Atletico Marte, FAS, Aguila, LA Firpo, Municipal Limeno, Excélsior F.C. coach)
- Eduardo Santana (ex Brazilian Aguila player)
- Jorge Búcaro (ex Aguila, Alianza, FAS and Platense player)
- Jose Luis Bracamonte (ex Alianza, Quequeisque and Platense player)
- Geovany Zetino (ex San Luis player)
- Pedro Jose Vasquez (ex Sonsonate, Quequeisque and ADLER player)
- Carlos Jurado (ex Uruguayan Atletico Marte and Alianza coach)
- Alexsander Rodríguez (ex Chalatenango coach)
- Mario “Pulga” Nájera (ex FAS player)
- Efrain Nunez (Ex hondurian player Fuerte San Francisco and Ex Vista Hermosa coach
- Didier Castro (ex Costa Rican Dragon and El Roble coach)

== Managerial changes ==
=== Before the start of the season ===
Team	Outgoing manager	Manner of departure	Date of vacancy	Replaced by	Date of appointment	Position in table
Aguila	(Argentina) Sebastián Bini	Contract finished, Hired as Municipal new coach	May 27, 2023	(Argentina) Ernesto Corti	May 27, 2023	th (2023 Clausura)
Santa Tecla	(Argentina) Ernesto Corti	Mutual Consent, went on to become Aguila new coach	May 27, 2023	(El Salvador) Francisco Medrano	July 15, 2023	th (2023 Clausura)
FAS	(El Salvador) Efren Marenco	Mutual Consent, Moved to be reserve coach	June 1, 2023	(Mexico) Raúl Arias	June 8, 2023	th (2023 Clausura)
Jocoro	(El Salvador) Víctor Coreas	Mutual Consent	June 21, 2023	(Peru) Agustin Castillo	June 22, 2023	th (2023 Clausura)
Alianza	(Colombia) Eduardo Lara	Mutual Consent	June 27, 2023	(El Salvador) Milton Meléndez	June 28, 2023	th (2023 Clausura)
Municipal Limeno	(El Salvador) José Romero	Mutual Consent	June 21, 2023	(Honduras) Jorge Ernesto Pineda	June 22, 2023	None (2023 Clausura)

=== During the Apertura season ===
Team	Outgoing manager	Manner of departure	Date of vacancy	Replaced by	Date of appointment	Position in table
Municipal Limeno	(Honduras) Jorge Pineda	Mutual Consent	August 24, 2023	(El Salvador) Nelson Ancheta	August 25, 2023	th (2023 Apertura)
Municipal Limeno	(El Salvador) Nelson Ancheta	Resigned	October 17, 2023	(El Salvador) Abel Flores (Interim)	October, 2023	9th (2023 Apertura)
Platense	(Spain) Juan Cortés Diéguez	Resigned	October 23, 2023	(El Salvador) Jorge Abrego	October 25, 2023	11th (2023 Apertura)
Santa Tecla	(El Salvador) Francisco Medrano	Resigned	October 23, 2023	(El Salvador) Juan Ramón Sánchez	October 25, 2023	12th (2023 Apertura)
Fuerte San Francisco	(Uruguay) Pablo Quiñones	Sacked	November 15, 2023	(El Salvador) Jesús Álvarez (Interim)	November, 2023	8th (2023 Apertura)

=== Between the Apertura and Clausura season ===
Team	Outgoing manager	Manner of departure	Date of vacancy	Replaced by	Date of appointment	Position in table
Municipal Limeno	(El Salvador) Abel Flores (Interim)	End of Interimship	December 11, 2023	(El Salvador) William Renderos	December 11, 2023	9th (2023 Apertura)
Dragon	(El Salvador) Marvín Benitez	Mutual consent	December 21, 2023	(El Salvador) Manuel Acevedo	December 24, 2024	7th (2023 Apertura)
Isidro Metapán	(El Salvador) Jorge Rodríguez	Resigned	December 23, 2023	(Argentina) Julio Zamora	December 28, 2024	8th (2023 Apertura)
Alianza	(El Salvador) Milton Meléndez	Moved to become director of sports	December 29, 2023	(El Salvador) Jorge Rodríguez	December 29, 2023	4th (2023 Apertura)
LA Firpo	(El Salvador) Guillermo Rivera	Mutual consent	December 2023	(Argentina) Gabriel Álvarez	January, 2024	3rd (2023 Apertura)
Fuerte San Francisco	(El Salvador) Jesús Álvarez	End of interimship	January 4, 2024	(Argentina) Fabio Gaston Larramendi	January 4, 2024	5th (2023 Apertura)

=== Clausura seasons ===
Team	Outgoing manager	Manner of departure	Date of vacancy	Replaced by	Date of appointment	Position in table
Fuerte San Francisco	(Argentina) Fabio Gaston Larramendi	Sacked	February 8, 2024	(El Salvador) Nelson Ancheta	February 9, 2024	11th (2024 Clausura)
Jocoro	(Peru) Agustin Castillo	Mutual Consent	February 12, 2024	(El Salvador) Carlos Romero	February 13, 2024	12th (2024 Clausura)
Jocoro	(El Salvador) Carlos Romero	Resigned	March 24, 2024	(El Salvador) Marvin Hernandez (Interim)	March 25, 2024	12th (2024 Clausura)
Santa Tecla	(El Salvador) Juan Ramón Sánchez	Sacked	March 28, 2024	(El Salvador) Francisco Medrano	March 28, 2024	th (2024 Clausura)
FAS	(Mexico) Raúl Arias	Mutual Consent	April 12, 2024	(Uruguay) Richard Preza	April 13, 2024	th (2024 Clausura)
Isidro Metapan	(Argentina) Julio Zamora	Mutual Consent	April 19, 2024	(Argentina) Carlos Martinez (Interim)	April 22, 2024	th (2024 Clausura)

== Apertura ==
=== League table ===
Pos	Team	Pld	W	D	L	GF	GA	GD	Pts	Qualification or relegation
1	Águila (Q)	22	13	5	4	39	22	+17	44	Advance to Playoffs
2	FAS (Q)	22	12	6	4	36	23	+13	42	Advance to Playoffs
3	Luis Ángel Firpo (Q)	22	10	7	5	36	26	+10	37	Advance to Playoffs
4	Alianza (Q)	22	7	11	4	28	20	+8	32	Advance to Playoffs
5	Fuerte San Francisco (Q)	22	10	4	8	27	24	+3	34	Advance to Playoffs
6	Jocoro (Q)	22	9	5	8	29	28	+1	32	Advance to Playoffs
7	Dragón (Q)	22	8	6	8	40	39	+1	30	Advance to Playoffs
8	Isidro Metapán (Q)	22	7	8	7	30	28	+2	29	Advance to Playoffs
9	Municipal Limeño (E)	22	8	4	10	29	33	−4	28	
10	Once Deportivo (E)	22	7	6	9	26	30	−4	27	
11	Platense (E)	22	2	6	14	19	44	−25	12	
12	Santa Tecla (E)	22	1	8	13	20	42	−22	11	

Updated to match(es) played on 22 November 2023. Source:
Rules for classification: 1) points; 2) goal difference; 3) number of goals scored.
(E) Eliminated; (Q) Qualified for the phase indicated

=== Apertura 2023 Records ===
==== Records ====
- Best home records: Aguila (24 points out of 33 points)
- Worst home records: Santa Tecla and Platense (7 points out of 33 points)
- Best away records : Aguila and FAS (20 points out of 33 points)
- Worst away records : Santa Tecla (4 points out of 33 points)
- Most goals scored: Dragón (40 goals)
- Fewest goals scored: Platense (19 goals)
- Fewest goals conceded : Alianza (20 goals)
- Most goals conceded : Platense (44 goals)

=== Scoring ===
- First goal of the season: (El Salvador) Santos Ortiz for Aguila against Santa Tecla, 22 minutes (August 14, 2023)
- First goal by a foreign player: (Trinidad and Tobago) Jomal Williams for Once Deportivo against Platense, 76th minutes (August 14, 2023)
- Fastest goal in a match: 23 Seconds
  - (Colombia) Yerson Tobar for Alianza against Santa Tecla (October 23, 2023)
- Goal scored at the latest goal in a match: 94 minutes
  - (El Salvador) Lizandro Claros goal for LA Firpo against Jocoro (August 20, 2023)
    (El Salvador) Roberto Gonzalez for Once Deportivo against Fuerte San Francisco (August 21, 2023)
- First penalty Kick of the season: (El Salvador) Rodolfo Zelaya for Alianza against FAS, 7th minutes (August 19, 2023)
- Widest winning margin: 4 goals
  - Aguila 5–1 Dragon (August 20, 2023)
- First hat-trick of the season: (Colombia) Carlos Salazar for Aguila against Dragon (August 21, 2023)
- First own goal of the season: (El Salvador) Ivan Mancia (Alianza) for Fuerte San Francisco (October 7, 2023)
- Most goals in a match: 8 goals
  - Alianza 5-3 FAS (August 19, 2023)
- Most goals by one team in a match: 5 goals
  - Alianza 5-3 FAS (August 19, 2023)
    Aguila 5–1 Dragon (August 21, 2023)
- Most goals in one half by one team: 4 goals
  - Alianza 5-0 (5–3) FAS (1st half, August 19, 2023)
- Most goals scored by losing team: 3 goals
  - FAS 3–5 Alianza (August 19, 2023)
- Most goals by one player in a single match: 4 goals
  - (Colombia) Carlos Salazar for Aguila against Dragon (August 21, 2023)
- Players that scored a hat-trick':
  - (Colombia) Carlos Salazar for Aguila against Dragon (August 21, 2023)
  - (Colombia) Duvier Riascos for Aguila against Isidro Metapan (September 10, 2023)

==== Top Goalscorer (Apertura 2023) ====
No.	Player	Club	Goals
1	(Colombia) Carlos Salazar	Aguila	15
2	(Argentina) German Aguila	Jocoro	15
3	(Mexico) Luis Ángel Landín	Municipal Limeno	13
4	(Colombia) Jhon Montano	Dragon	11
5	(El Salvador) Javier Ferman	Dragon	10
6	(Chile) Sebastián Julio	LA Firpo	10
7	(Paraguay) Nicolas Gonzalez	Fuerte San Francisco	9
8	(Colombia) Duvier Riascos	Aguila	9
9	(El Salvador) Emerson Mauricio	Alianza	8
10	(Brazil) Mateus Ramos	LA Firpo	7
10	(El Salvador) Kevin Reyes	FAS	7

==== Quarterfinals ====
===== First legs =====
30 November 2023
15:00 (UTC-6)

Dragon	1-1	FAS
Javier Ferman 96'		Jairo Martinez 26'

Estadio Juan Francisco Barraza, San Miguel
Referee: Filiberto Martinez
30 November 2023
15:15 (UTC-6)

Alianza	4-0	Fuerte San Francisco
Emerson Mauricio 16' 50'; Michel Mercado 33'; Marvin Monterroza 55'		Nil

Estadio Anna Mercedes Campos, Sonsonate
Referee: Ivan Barton
1 December 2023
19:00 (UTC-6)

Jocoro	1-0	LA Firpo
Emmanuel Hernandez 56'		Nil

Complejo Deportivo Tierra de Fuego, Jocoro
Referee: Waldir Garcia
1 December 2023
18:30 (UTC-6)

Isidro Metapan	0-0	Aguila
Nil		Nil

Estadio Jorge Calero Suárez
Referee: TBD

===== Second legs =====
3 December 2023
15:00 (UTC-6)

Fuerte San Francisco	1-1	Alianza
Samuel Giménez 45'		Eduardo Vigil own 39'

Estadio Correcaminos
Referee: German Martinez

Alianza won 5-1 on Aggregate

4 December 2023
20:00 (UTC-6)

FAS	0-1	Dragon
Nil		Jhon Montano 29'

Estadio Oscar Quiteño, Santa Ana
Referee: Ivan Cornejo

Dragon won 2-1 on Aggregate

4 December 2023
15:00 (UTC-6)

LA Firpo	1-1	Jocoro
Sebastian Julio 11'		German Aguila 44'

Estadio Sergio Torres, Usulután
Referee: Jaime Herrera

Jocoro won 2-1 on Aggregate

4 December 2023
15:00 (UTC-6)

Aguila	1-0	Isidro Metapan
Lucas Ventura 11'		Nil

Estadio Juan Francisco Barraza, San Miguel
Referee: Hector Salazar

Aguila won 1-0 on aggregate

==== Semifinals ====
===== First legs =====
10 December 2023
15:00 (UTC-6)

Dragon	1-3	Jocoro
Luis Angulo 64'		Junior Padilla 18'; Joel Turcios 51'; Juan Carlos Argueta 96'

Estadio Juan Francisco Barraza, San Miguel
Referee: Cesar Nolasco
11 December 2023
15:00 (UTC-6)

Alianza	1-1	Aguila
Emerson Mauiricio 58'		Carlos Salazar 65'

Estadio Cuscatlan, San Salvador
Referee: Juan Francisco Quinteros

===== Second legs =====
17 December 2023
15:00 (UTC-6)

Jocoro	3-1	Dragon
Luis Acuna 42'; Juan Carlos Argueta 51'; Junior Padilla 52'		Javier Ferman 33'

Complejo Deportivo Tierra de Fuego, Jocoro
Referee: Vicente Ruiz

Jocoro won 6-2 on aggregate

18 December 2023
15:15 (UTC-6)

Aguila	2-1	Alianza
Carlos Salazar 44' 87'		Ronald Gomez Own 78'

TBD
Referee: TBD

Aguila won 3-2 on aggregate

==== Final ====
December 23, 2023
18:00 UTC−6
Final

Aguila	3-0	Jocoro
Carlos Pimienta 35'; Carlos Salazar 67'; Duvier Riascos 87'		Nil

Estadio Cuscatlán, San Salvador
Attendance: TBD
Referee: Iván Barton

Aguila
GK	1	(Uruguay) Rafael Garcia
DF	16	(El Salvador) Kevin Melara
DF	2	(El Salvador) Julio Sibrian
DF	28	(El Salvador) Ronald Rodriguez
DF	20	(Uruguay) Carlos Pimentia	35'
MF	12	(El Salvador) Santos Ortiz	(substituted off) 46'
MF	24	(El Salvador) Darwin Ceren
MF	10	(El Salvador) Gerson Mayen	(substituted off) 46'
MF	14	(El Salvador) Melvin Cartagena
FW	21	(Colombia) Carlos Salazar	35' (substituted off) 46' (yellow card) 11'
FW	8	(Brazil) Lucas Ventura	(substituted off) 46'
Substitutes:
MF	5	(El Salvador) Tomas Granitto		(substituted on) 62'
MF	6	(El Salvador) Dixon Rivas		(substituted on) 78'
DF	27	(El Salvador) Herberth Diaz		(substituted on) 46'
FW	7	(Colombia) Duvier Riascos		(substituted on) 34' (goal) 87' (yellow card) 11'
Manager:
(Argentina) Ernesto Corti

Jocoro
GK	1	(El Salvador) Danilo Joya
DF	6	(El Salvador) Johnathan Quintanilla
DF	23	(El Salvador) Nelson Moreno	(yellow card) 65'
DF	19	(El Salvador) Elvis Claros
DF	11	(Honduras) Elmer Guity
MF	10	(Argentina) Luis Acuna	Substituted off
MF	12	(El Salvador) Emmanuel Hernandez	(substituted off) 71'
MF	14	(El Salvador) Wilson Rugamas	(yellow card) 23'
MF	10	(El Salvador) Lester Blanco	Substituted off
FW	17	(Honduras) Junior Padilla	(substituted off) 77'
FW	9	(Argentina) German Aguila	(yellow card) 75'
Substitutes:
MF	7	(El Salvador) Herbert Sosa		(substituted on) 71'
MF	'22	(El Salvador) Joel Turcios		Substituted on
MF	16	(El Salvador) Juan Carlos Argueta		Substituted on
DF	4	(El Salvador) Orlando Martinez	(substituted on) 77'
Manager:
(Peru) Agustin Castillo

Apertura 2023 champions

17th title

== Clausura ==
=== League table ===
Pos	Team	Pld	W	D	L	GF	GA	GD	Pts	Qualification or relegation
1	Alianza	22	13	6	3	39	13	+26	45	Advance to Playoffs
2	Luis Ángel Firpo	22	13	3	6	47	30	+17	42	Advance to Playoffs
3	Municipal Limeño	22	12	3	7	33	25	+8	39	Advance to Playoffs
4	Águila	22	10	8	4	29	18	+11	38	Advance to Playoffs
5	FAS	22	8	8	6	26	24	+2	32	Advance to Playoffs
6	Platense	22	9	5	8	26	29	−3	32	Advance to Playoffs
7	Isidro Metapán	22	9	4	9	24	22	+2	31	Advance to Playoffs
8	Once Deportivo	22	8	7	7	22	24	−2	31	Advance to Playoffs
9	Dragón	22	9	3	10	27	33	−6	30	
10	Santa Tecla	22	5	5	12	26	39	−13	20	
11	Fuerte San Francisco	22	4	5	13	19	30	−11	17	
12	Jocoro	22	2	3	17	13	44	−31	9	

Updated to match(es) played on 24 March 2024. Source:
Rules for classification: 1) points; 2) goal difference; 3) number of goals scored.

=== Clausura 2024 Records ===
==== Records ====
- Best home records: TBD (00 points out of 33 points)
- Worst home records: TBD (0 points out of 33 points)
- Best away records : TBD (00 points out of 33 points)
- Worst away records : TBD (0 points out of 33 points)
- Most goals scored: LA Firpo (47 goals)
- Fewest goals scored: Jocoro (13 goals)
- Fewest goals conceded : Alianza (13 goals)
- Most goals conceded : Jocoro (44 goals)

=== Scoring ===
- First goal of the season: (Mexico) Yair Delgadillo for Limeno against Santa Tecla, 20 minutes (January 14, 2024)
- First goal by a foreign player: (Mexico) Yair Delgadillo for Limeno against Santa Tecla, 20 minutes (January 14, 2024)
- Fastest goal in a match: 29 seconds
  - (Uruguay) Ányelo Rodríguez for Alianza against Aguila (March 30, 2024)
- Goal scored at the latest goal in a match: 100 minutes
  - (Brazil) Matheus da Silva goal for LA Firpo against Santa Tecla (March 10, 2024)
- First penalty Kick of the season: (El Salvador) Diego Chavez for Once Deportivo against Alianza, 80th minutes (January 15, 2024)
- Widest winning margin: 5 goals
  - Municipal Limeno 5-0 Platense (January 25, 2024)
- First hat-trick of the season: (Brazil) Mateus da Silva for LA Firpo against Santa Tecla (March 10, 2024)
- First own goal of the season: (El Salvador) Johnathon Nolasco (FAS) for Once Deportivo (March 10, 2024)
- Most goals in a match: 8 goals
  - Alianza 5-3 FAS (August 19, 2023)
- Most goals by one team in a match: 6 goals
  - Alianza 6-1 Dragon (April 24, 2024)
- Most goals in one half by one team: 3 goals
  - Municipal Limeno 3-0 (5–0) Platense (January 25, 2024)
- Most goals scored by losing team: 3 goals
  - TBD 3–5 TBD (August 19, 2023)
- Most goals by one player in a single match: 3 goals
  - (Brazil) Mateus da Silva for LA Firpo against Santa Tecla (March 10, 2024)
- Players that scored a hat-trick':
  - (Brazil) Mateus da Silva for LA Firpo against Santa Tecla (March 10, 2024)
  - (Mexico) Yair Delgadillo for Limeno against Santa Tecla (March 24, 2024)
  - (El Salvador) Bryan Paz for Fuerte San Francisco against Platense (April 15, 2024)
  - (Chile) Sebastian Julio for Alianza against Dragon (April 24, 2024)
  - (El Salvador) Steven Vasquez for LA Firpo against Jocoro (May 2, 2024)

==== Top Goalscorer (Clausura 2024) ====
No.	Player	Club	Goals
1	(El Salvador) Styven Vásquez	LA Firpo	15
2	(Mexico) Yair Delgadillo	Municipal Limeno	14
3	(El Salvador) Sebastian Julio	Alianza	10
4	(El Salvador) Isaac Esquivel	Isidro Metapan	8
5	(El Salvador) Rafael Tejada	FAS	7
6	(El Salvador) Daniel Arevalo	Platense	6
7	(Brazil) Mateus da Silva	LA Firpo	6
8	(Colombia) Manuel Murillo	Dragon	6
9	(El Salvador) Bryan Paz	Aguila	6
10	(Colombia) Carlos Salazar	Aguila	6

==== Quarterfinals ====
===== First legs =====
9 May 2024
19:30 (UTC-6)

Isidro Metapan	2-0	LA Firpo
Jonathan Esquivel 59'; Dennis Garcia 85'		Nil

Estadio Jorge Calero Suárez, Metapan
Referee: TBD
10 May 2024
15:30 (UTC-6)

Platense	0-3	Municipal Limeno
Nil		Lizandro Claros 38'; Javier Ferman 63'; Yair Delgadillo 69'

Estadio Antonio Toledo Valle, Zacatecoluca
Referee: Juan Francisco Quinteros
10 May 2024
19:00 (UTC-6)

FAS	3-1	Aguila
Jose Portillo 7'; Rudy Clavel 12'; Jairo Molina 84'		Kevin Reyes 38'

Estadio Oscar Quiteño, Santa Ana
Referee: TBD
10 May 2024
18:30 (UTC-6)

Once Deportivo	1-1	Alianza
Javier Bolanos 89'		Marvin Monterroza 83'

Estadio Simeón Magaña, Ahuachapan
Referee: TBD

===== Second legs =====
12 May 2024
15:00 (UTC-6)

LA Firpo	1-0	Isidro Metapan
Enrique Rivas 48'		Nil

Estadio Sergio Rivera Torres, Usulutan
Referee: TBD

Isidro Metapan won 2-1 on Aggregate

12 May 2024
20:00 (UTC-6)

Alianza	2-0	Once Deportivo
Michell Mercado 33'; Rodolfo Zelaya (pen.), 91'		Nil

Estadio Cuscatlan, San Salvador
Referee: TBD

Alianza FC won 3-1 on Aggregate

13 May 2024
15:00 (UTC-6)

Aguila	3-1	FAS
Darwin Ceren 19'; Carlos Salazar 25' 99'		Rudy Clavel 58'

Estadio Juan Francisco Barraza, San Miguel
Referee: TBD

FAS won 5-4 on penalties, after tying 4-4 aggregate

13 May 2024
19:00 (UTC-6)

Municipal Limeno	0-2	Platense
Nil		Marlon Cornejo 20'; Wilber Arizala 94'

Estadio Jose Berrios, Santa Rosa Lima
Referee: Filiberto Martinez

Municipal Limeno won 3-2 on aggregate

==== Semifinals ====
===== First legs =====
18 May 2024
19:30 (UTC-6)

FAS	1-1	Alianza
Rodrigo Rivera 78'	TBD	Marvin Monterroza 60'

Estadio Oscar Alberto Quiteno, Santa Ana
Referee: TBD
15 May 2024
19:30 (UTC-6)

Isidro Metapan	0-2	Municipal Limeno
Nil		Marvin Ramos 51'; Luis Angel Landin 88'

Estadio Jorge Suarez Landaverde, Metapan
Referee: TBD

===== Second legs =====
18 May 2024
19:30 (UTC-6)

Municipal Limeno	0-1	Isidro Metapan
Nil	TBD	Gregori Diaz 19'

Estadio Jose Ramon Flores
Referee: TBD

Municipal Limeno won 2-1 on aggregate

21 May 2024
20:00 (UTC-6)

Alianza	2-1	FAS
Rudy Clavel , 36' (o.g.); Leonardo Menjivar 84'		Jonathan Nolasco 25'

Estadio Cuscatlan
Referee: TBD

Alianza won 3-2 on aggregate

==== Final ====
May 26, 2024
18:00 UTC−6
Final

Alianza	5-0	Municipal Limeno
Emerson Mauricio 10' 27' 45' 66'; Henry Romero 58'		Nil

Estadio Cuscatlán, San Salvador
Attendance: TBD
Referee: Ivan Barton

Alianza
GK	25	(El Salvador) Mario González
DF	5	(El Salvador) Mario Jacobo
DF	16	(El Salvador) Henry Romero	58'
DF	17	(El Salvador) Alexis Renderos	(yellow card) 46'
DF	15	(El Salvador) Jonathan Jiménez
MF	6	(El Salvador) Narciso Orellana	(yellow card) 55'
MF	19	(El Salvador) Andrés Hernández	(substituted off) 59'
MF	21	(El Salvador) Marvin Monterroza	(yellow card) 73' (substituted off) 74'
MF	7	(Uruguay) Ányelo Rodríguez	(substituted off) 69'
FW	23	(Colombia) Michell Mercado	(substituted off) 74'
FW	30	(El Salvador) Emerson Mauricio	10' 27' 45' 66' (substituted off) 70'
Substitutes:
MF	8	(El Salvador) Oscar Rodriguez		(substituted on) 59'
MF	10	(El Salvador) Leonardo Rodriguez		(substituted on) 74'
DF	11	(El Salvador) Juan Portillo		(substituted on) 74'
FW	22	(El Salvador) Rodolfo Zelaya		(substituted on) 70'
FW	26	(El Salvador) Elias Rivas		(substituted on) 69'
Manager:
(El Salvador) Jorge Rodriguez

Municipal Limeno
GK	29	(El Salvador) Yimy Cuéllar
DF	2	(El Salvador) Lizandro Claros	(yellow card) 57'
DF	12	(El Salvador) Rubén Marroquín
DF	5	(Honduras) Ever Alvarado	21
DF	16	(El Salvador) Tereso Benítez
MF	11	(El Salvador) Elvin Alvarado	(yellow card) 68' (substituted off) 68'
MF	6	(El Salvador) Bryan Landaverde	(substituted off) 89'
MF	10	(El Salvador) Marvin Ramos	(yellow card) 26'
FW	21	(El Salvador) Gilberto Baires	(substituted off) 27'
FW	30	(El Salvador) Javier Fermán	(substituted off) 47'
FW	22	(Mexico) Yair Delgadillo	(substituted off) 67'
Substitutes:
MF	4	(El Salvador) Walter Guevara		(substituted on) 47'
MF	'9	(Mexico) Luis Landin		(substituted on) 67'
MF	3	(El Salvador) Jose Villalobos		(substituted on) 27'
DF	24	(El Salvador) Rudy Ramirez	(substituted on) 89'
DF	7	(El Salvador) Jefferson Valladares	(substituted on) 68'
Manager:
(El Salvador) William Renderos

Clausura 2024 champions

18th title

== List of foreign players in the league ==
This is a list of foreign players in the 2023–24 season. The following players:

1. Have played at least one game for the respective club.
2. Have not been capped for the El Salvador national football team on any level, independently from the birthplace

A new rule was introduced this season, that clubs can have four foreign players per club and can only add a new player if there is an injury or a player is released and it is before the close of the season transfer window.

Águila

- (Brazil) Lucas Ventura
- (Colombia) Duvier Riascos
- (Colombia) Carlos Salazar
- (Uruguay) Carlos Daniel Pimienta
- (Colombia) Ronaldinho Caicedo
- (Colombia) Luis Angel Rodriguez
- (Colombia) Juan Pablo Otálvaro

Alianza

- (Colombia) Mitchel Mercado
- (Colombia) Yerson Tobar
- (Chile) Sebastián Julio
- (Uruguay) Ányelo Rodríguez

Dragon

- (Colombia) Luis Angulo
- (Colombia) Yair Arboleda
- (Colombia) Kevin Moreno
- (Colombia) Jhon Montaño
- (Colombia) Manuel Chala
- (Colombia) Manuel Murrillo
- (Colombia) Yerson Tobar

FAS

- (Brazil) Caio Laursen
- (Colombia) Félix Micolta
- (Ecuador) Joao Plata
- (Mexico) Luis Ángel Mendoza
- (Colombia) Devier Chaverra
- (Colombia) Harrison Mojica
- (Colombia) Yair Arboleda
- (Colombia) Jairo Molina

Firpo

- (Brazil) Mateus Da Silva
- (Chile) Sebastián Julio
- (Colombia) Tardelis Pena
- (Paraguay) Oliver Almirón
- (Brazil) Guilherme Silva
- (Trinidad and Tobago) Jomal Williams

Fuerte San Francisco

- (Colombia) Luis Angulo
- (Jamaica) Colorado Murray
- (Paraguay) Nicolas Gonzalez
- (Paraguay) Samuel Gimenez
- (Paraguay) Carlos Alberto Gonzalez Saracho

Isidro Metapán

- (Argentina) Luca Orozco
- (Brazil) Paulo Henrique
- (Ecuador) Javier Cetre
- (Spain) Diego Gregori
- (Paraguay) Jose Andres Ortiz

Jocoro

- (Argentina) Luis Acuna
- (Argentina) Germán Aguila
- (Honduras) Elmer Guity
- (Honduras) Junior Padilla

Municipal Limeno

- (Honduras) Éver Alvarado
- (Mexico) Luis Ángel Landín
- (Mexico) Juan de Alba
- (Mexico) Yair Delgadillo

Once Deportivo

- (Colombia) Victor Landazuri
- (Colombia) Camilo Delgado
- (Colombia) Manuel Murrillo
- (Trinidad and Tobago) Jomal Williams
- (Mexico) Kevin Chaurand
- (Colombia) Jhonathan Urrutia

Platense

- (Colombia) Raúl Peñaranda
- (Colombia) Ronaldinho Caicedo
- (Colombia) Luis Angel Rodriguez
- (Nicaragua) (Spain) Pablo Gállego
- (Colombia) Wilber Arizala
- (Paraguay) Sandro Melgarejo
- (Ecuador) Eber Caicedo
- (Panama) Jair Catuy

Santa Tecla

- (Argentina) Alejandro Frezzotti
- (Argentina) Adrian Toloza
- (Argentina) Gonzalo Tarifa
- (Colombia) Jeffersson Sierra

(player released beginning the Apertura season, Never played a game) (player released during the Apertura season) (player released between the Apertura and Clausura seasons) (player released during the Clausura season) (player naturalized for the Clausura season) (player released beginning the Clausura season, Never played a game)
