= List of Luis Angel Firpo records and statistics =

Club Deportivo Luis Angel Firpo is a Salvadoran professional association football club based in Usutlan. The club was formed in 1908 as Tecún Umán. Firpo currently plays in the Primera División.

This list encompasses the major honours won by Firpo and records set by the club, their managers and their players. The player records section includes details of the club's leading goalscorers and those who have made most appearances in first-team competitions. It also records notable achievements by Firpo players on the international stage, and the highest transfer fees paid and received by the club.

Firpo has set various records since its founding.

== Honours ==
Firpo has won primera division ten times, which ranks tied for fourth in Salvadoran football history.

=== Domestic honours ===
==== League ====
- Primera División and predecessors
  - Champions (10): 1988–89, 1990–91, 1991–92, 1992–93, 1997–98, 1999 Clausura, 2000 Clausura, Apertura 2007, Clausura 2008, Clausura 2013
- Segunda División Salvadorean and predecessors
  - Champions: TBD
- Tercera División Salvadorean and predecessors
  - Champions: TBD

==== Cups ====
- Copa President and predecessors
  - Runners-up (1) : 2000

==== CONCACAF ====
- CONCACAF Cup Winners Cup
  - Runners up (1) : 1995
- Torneo de la Fraternidad de Centroamérica
  - Champion : 1942

=== Friendly tournaments ===
- Copa Camel
  - Runners up (1) : 1991

=== Award winners ===
Top Goalscorer (6)

The following players have won the Goalscorer while playing for LA Firpo:

- (Brazil) Gustavo Souza
- (Brazil) Toninho dos Santos
- (El Salvador) Raul Diaz Arce
- (El Salvador) Alfredo ‘Chelito’ Pérez
- (El Salvador) Manuel Martinez
- (El Salvador) Styven Vásquez
- (Panama) Anel Canales

== Team statistics ==
=== Primera Division ===
- Most seasons played in Primera Division: 32 years (from 1982 season to Clausura 2014)
- Most consecutive games undefeated: 31 games, 13 wins and 18 draws, (1990/91 seasons)
- Most consecutive wins: 17 (in TBD season)
- Most consecutive lost: 17 (in TBD season)

=== Matches ===
==== Firsts ====
- First league match: TBD 3–2 Firpo, Prima Categoria, 10 January 1909.
- First Copa Presidente match: Firpo 14–0 TBD, 11 November 1926.
- First CONCACAF match: Firpo 0–1 C.S. Cartaginés, CONCACAF Champions League, 1989.

==== Wins ====
- Record win: 16–0 against TBD, Prima Categoria, 10 January 1915.
- Record Primera division win: 11–0 against Cojutepeque F.C., 30 April 1995.
- Record Copa El Salvador win: 5–0 against Maracaná San Rafael, 2006.
- Record win in CONCACAF competitions: 8–0 against CRKSV Jong Colombia, CONCACAF Cup Winners Cup, 1995.
- Most wins in a Primera division season: 30 (out of 38 games), during the 2006–07 season.

==== Defeats ====
- Record Primera division defeat: 1–9 against TBD, 10 June 1961.
- Record Copa El Salvador defeat:
  - 0–5 against TBD, 8 January 1998;
- Record defeat in CONCACAF competitions:
  - 0-4 against Pérez Zeledón, CONCACAF Champions League, 2005.
- Most defeats in a Primera division season: 19 (out of 40 games), during the TBD season.
- Fewest defeats in a Primera division season: 1 (out of 38 games), during the TBD season.

=== Points ===
- Most points in a Primera division season:
  - League format: TBD in 38 games, during the TBD season
  - Apertura/Clausura formats: 50 Points in 22 games, during the 2025 Apertura season.
- Fewest points in a Primera season:
  - League format: TBD in 30 games, during the TBD season.
  - Apertura/Clausura formats: TBD in 38 games, during the TBD season.

=== Overall ===
- Most consecutive games undefeated: 41 games (from 20 August, 1990 to 10 April, 1991)

=== Overall seasons table in Primera División de Fútbol Profesional ===
Pos.	Club	Season In D1	Pl.	W	D	L	GS	GA	Dif.
TBA	LA Firpo	65	2010	725	613	667	2644	2520	+124

Last updated: 22 September 2023

== International representation ==
At the beginning of the nineties they participated in their first international tournament, and surpassed expectations by defeating the Mexican side Pumas UNAM 1–0 in the first round however they lost in the second round by penalties against Alajuelense from Costa Rica. For the 2008–09 CONCACAF Champions League, they were eliminated in the group stage, after having qualified directly into the round as El Salvador's champions. They once again participated in the 2009–10 CONCACAF Champions League, however they were eliminated in the preliminary round by the MLS team DC United.

=== Performance in CONCACAF competitions ===
- CONCACAF Champions' Cup: 8 appearances

Best: Quarter-finals in 1997 and 1998
1989 : First Round
1990 : Third Round
1991 : Third Round
1992 : Third Round
1993 : Second Round
1994 : First Round
1997 : Quarter-finals
1998 : Quarter-finals

- CONCACAF Champions League: 3 appearances

Best: Group stage in 2008 and 2013
2008–09 : Group stage
2009–10 : Preliminary round
2013–14 : Group stage

- CONCACAF Cup Winners Cup: 2 appearances

Best: Runner up in 1995
1993 : 3rd place
1995 : Runner-up

- Copa Interclubes UNCAF: 2 appearances

Best: Quarter-finals in 2005
1999 : First Round
2005 : Quarter-finals

- CONCACAF Central American Cup: 1 appearances

Best: Quarter Final in 2026
2024 : Group stage
2026: Quarter-Final

=== Record versus other clubs ===
As of 2026-10-31

The Concacaf opponents below = Official tournament results: (Plus a sampling of other results)

Opponent	Last Meeting	G	W	D	L	F	A	PTS	+/-
(Costa Rica) Alajuelense	2026	6	3	1	2	10	9	10	+1
(El Salvador) Alianza	2024	3	1	1	1	3	5	4	-2
(Mexico) Atlante	1994	2	0	0	2	2	6	0	-4
(Guatemala) Aurora	1998	3	1	2	0	5	3	5	+2
(Costa Rica) Cartaginés	1989	1	0	0	1	0	1	0	-1
(Guatemala) Comunicaciones	2024	7	3	2	2	13	13	11	0
(United States) DC United	2009–10	2	0	2	0	2	2	2	0
(Nicaragua) Diriangén	2026	1	1	0	0	4	0	3	+4
(Belize) Duurly's	1991	2	2	0	0	8	0	6	+8
(United States) Houston Dynamo	2008–09	2	0	1	1	1	2	1	-1
Juventus-Belize	1999	2	1	0	1	2	3	3	-1
(Italy) Juventus	Friendly	1	1	0	0	1	0	3	+1
(Curaçao) Jong Colombia	1995	1	1	0	0	8	0	3	+8
(United States) LA Galaxy	1997	1	0	0	1	0	2	0	-2
(Mexico) León	1998	1	0	1	0	1	1	1	0
(Honduras) Marathon	2024	1	0	0	1	0	1	0	-1
(Honduras) Motagua	1999	2	1	0	1	2	2	3	0
(Mexico) Monterrey	1993	1	0	0	1	3	4	0	-1
(Honduras) CD Olimpia	2026	8	2	3	3	8	10	9	-2
(Costa Rica) Pérez Zeledón	2005	2	0	1	1	2	6	1	-4
(Panama) Plaza Amador	1993	3	1	1	1	9	4	4	+5
(Honduras) Platense	1998	1	1	0	0	1	0	3	+1
(Mexico) Pumas UNAM	2008–09	2	1	2	1	2	4	5	-2
(Honduras) Real España	1995	4	1	2	1	4	2	5	+2
(Nicaragua) San Marcos Carazo	1995	2	2	0	0	10	1	6	-9
(Costa Rica) Saprissa	2026	8	1	3	4	7	13	5	-6
(Panama) San Francisco	2008–09	2	2	0	0	4	2	6	+2
(Guatemala) Suchitepéquez	1993	1	1	0	0	6	1	3	+3
(Panama) Tauro	1990	2	1	1	0	4	1	4	+3
(Mexico) Club Tijuana	2013–14	2	0	1	1	0	1	1	-1
(Mexico) CD Estudiantes de la UAG	1995	1	0	0	1	1	2	0	-1
(Belize) Verdes FC	1998	1	1	0	0	4	1	3	+3
(Honduras) CD Victoria	2013–14	2	2	0	0	6	2	6	+4
(Guatemala) Xelajú	2026	3	1	1	1	4	3	4	+1

=== Historical Matches ===
1946 Friendly	LA Firpo	3-3	Federal	Tegucigalpa, Honduras
	Rafael Galvez	[]	TBD
Note: First Ever International Game

June 11, 1991 Friendly	C.D. Luis Angel Firpo	0-0 (pen 4-3)	Juventus	Los Angeles, California, United States
	Nil		Nil	Stadium: Los Angeles Memorial Coliseum

July 25, 1995 Friendly	C.D. Luis Angel Firpo	3-4	Maccabi Haifa F.C.	Los Angeles, California, United States
	Raul Diaz Arce 4' 43'; Percibal Piggot 86'		Mizrahi 32' 81'; Ofer Sitrit 66' 71'	Stadium: Los Angeles Memorial Coliseum

July 27, 1995 Friendly	C.D. Luis Angel Firpo	4-0	Shirak SC	Los Angeles, California, United States
	Marlon Menjivar 34' 64' 83'; José María Batres 86'		Nil	Stadium: Los Angeles Memorial Coliseum

November 2, 1997 Friendly	C.D. Luis Angel Firpo	2-1	El Salvador	Usultan, El Salvador
	Julio Herrera 33'; Celio Rodriguez 67'		Waldir Guerra 90'	Stadium: Estadio Sergio Torres

== Players statistics ==
Most appearances (as of August 8, 2012)
#	Name	Career	Apps	Goals
1	TBD	Tbd-TBD	537	148
2				
3				
4				
5				
6				
7				
8				
9				
10				
11	TBD	Tbd-TBD	537	148
12				
13				
14				
15				
16				
17				
18				
19	Carlos Monteagudo	2007-2015, 2019-2020	234	
20	Mauricio Quintanilla	2001–2006, 2007–2008,2012–2014	291	

Most goals
#	Player	Career	Apps	Goals
1	(El Salvador) Raúl Díaz Arce	1991-1996	98	119
2	(Brazil) Fernando de Moura	1988-1993		(66)
3	(Chile) Raul Toro	1991-2000		(66)
4	(El Salvador) Abraham Vasquez “Peñero”	1975-1988		(58)
5	(Brazil) (El Salvador) Celio Rodriguez	1991–2001	104	56
6	(Panama) Anel Canales	2011–2014	106	(54)
7	(Argentina) Patricio Gómez Barroche	2007-2009		(46)
8	(Brazil) Toninho dos Santos	1988-1990		54 (43)
9	(Argentina) Fernando Leguizamón	2007-2010		(35)
10	(El Salvador) Edgar Henríquez	1987-1993		(35)
11	(Brazil) (El Salvador) Israel Castro Franco	1995-1998, 2002-2004		(34)
12	(Panama) Pércival Piggott	1994-1998, 2000-2001		(33)
13	(El Salvador) Manuel Martínez	1999, 2002, 2004-2006		(32)
14	(Brazil) (El Salvador) Nildeson	1989-1990, 1991-1992, 1998-1999, 2004		
15	TBD			
16	TBD			

=== Firpo's top flight top goalscorer ===
This is the list of Firpo's top league goalscorers in a single season

	Name	Season	Goals
1	(El Salvador) TBD	[[ ]]	00
2	(El Salvador) TBD	1948-49	00
3	(El Salvador) TBD	1949–50	00
4	(El Salvador) TBD	1950–51	00
5	(El Salvador) TBD	1951–52	00
6	(El Salvador) TBD	1952–53	00
7	(El Salvador) TBD	1953–54	00
8	(El Salvador) TBD	1955	00
9	(El Salvador) TBD	1955–56	00
10	(El Salvador) TBD	1956–57	00
11	(El Salvador) TBD	1960–61	00
12	(El Salvador) TBD	1961–62	00
13	(El Salvador) TBD	1962	00
14	(El Salvador) TBD	1967-68	00
15	(El Salvador) TBD	1973	00
16	(El Salvador) Elmer Rosas	1974-75	11
17	(El Salvador) Elmer Rosas	1975-1976	10
18	(El Salvador) TBD	1977–78	00
19	(El Salvador) TBD	1978–79	00
20	(El Salvador) TBD	1979–80	00
21	(El Salvador) TBD	1980–81	00
22	(El Salvador) TBD	1981	00
23	(El Salvador) TBD	1982	00
24	(El Salvador) TBD	1983	00
25	(El Salvador) TBD	1984	00
26	(El Salvador) TBD	1985	00
27	(El Salvador) TBD	1986–87	00
28	(El Salvador) TBD	1987–88	00
29	(El Salvador) TBD	1988-1989	00
30	(Brazil) Toninho Do Santos	1989-1990	25 (Note: finished the season as the league top scorer)
31	(Brazil) Toninho Do Santos	1990-91	15 (Note: finished the season as the league top scorer)
32	(El Salvador) TBD	1991-92	00
33	(El Salvador) TBD	1992-93	00
34	(El Salvador) Raul Diaz Arce	1993-1994	24 (Note: finished the season as the league top scorer)
35	(El Salvador) Raul Diaz Arce	1994-1995	25 (Note: finished the season as the league top scorer)
36	(El Salvador) Raul Diaz Arce	1995-1996	25 (Note: finished the season as the league top scorer)
37	(El Salvador) Israel castro Franco	1996-97	13
38	(El Salvador) Alfredo Perez	1997-1998	14 (Note: finished the season as the league top scorer)
39	(Brazil) Celio Rodriguez	Apertura 1998	6
40	(Brazil) Celio Rodriguez	Clausura 1999	10
41	(Brazil) Celio Rodriguez	Apertura 1999	7
42	(El Salvador) TBD	Clausura 2000	00
43	(El Salvador) Fredy González	Apertura 2000	9
44	(El Salvador) TBD	Clausura 2001	00
45	(El Salvador) TBD	Apertura 2001	00
46	(El Salvador) TBD	Clausura 2002	00
47	(El Salvador) TBD	Apertura 2002	00
48	(El Salvador) TBD	Clausura 2003	00
49	(El Salvador) TBD	Apertura 2003	00
50	(El Salvador) TBD	Clausura 2004	00
51	(El Salvador) TBD	Apertura 2004	00
52	(El Salvador) Manuel Martinez	Clausura 2005	8
53	(Honduras) (El Salvador) Franklin Webster	Apertura 2005	7
54	(El Salvador) TBD	Clausura 2006	00
55	(El Salvador) TBD	Apertura 2006	00
56	(Argentina) Mario Costas	Clausura 2007	7 (Note: finished the season as the league top scorer)
57	(El Salvador) TBD	Apertura 2007	00
58	(Argentina) Patricio Barroche	Clausura 2008	13
59	(Argentina) Pablo Leguizamón	Apertura 2008	7
60	(Argentina) Patricio Barroche	Clausura 2009	6
61	(Brazil) Leandro Franco	Apertura 2009	7
62	(El Salvador) Dennis Alas & (Colombia) Mario Benítez	Clausura 2010	5
63	(El Salvador) TBD	Apertura 2010	00
64	(Panama) TBD	Clausura 2011	00
65	(Panama) Anel Canales	Apertura 2011	14
66	(Panama) (El Salvador) Anel Canales	Clausura 2012	12 (Note: finished the season as the league top scorer)
67	(Panama) (El Salvador) Anel Canales	Apertura 2012	7
68	(Panama) (El Salvador) Anel Canales	Clausura 2013	10 (Note: finished the season as the league top scorer)
69	(El Salvador) TBD	Apertura 2013	00
70	(Panama) Anel Canales	Clausura 2014	00
71	(El Salvador) TBD	Apertura 2015	00
72	(El Salvador) TBD	Clausura 2016	00
73	(El Salvador) Wilma Torres/William Reyes	Apertura 2016	4
74	(Panama) Nicolás Muñoz	Clausura 2017	8
75	(Panama) Nicolás Muñoz	Apertura 2017	7
76	(El Salvador) Christopher Ramirez	Clausura 2018	9
77	(El Salvador) Christopher Ramirez	Apertura 2018	5
78	(El Salvador) Rafael Burgos (Colombia) Alonso Umaña	Clausura 2019	3
79	(Panama) Armando Polo	Apertura 2020	2
80	(Ecuador) Eber Caicedo	Clausura 2021	3
81	(Trinidad and Tobago) Jomal Williams	Apertura 2021	14
82	(Trinidad and Tobago) Jomal Williams	Clausura 2022	5
83	(Colombia) Raúl Peñaranda	Apertura 2022	4
84	(Chile) Sebastián Julio	Clausura 2023	6
85	(Chile) Sebastián Julio	Apertura 2023	10
86	(El Salvador) Styven Vásquez	Clausura 2024	15 (Note: finished the season as the league top scorer)
87	(Brazil) Gustavo Moura	Apertura 2024	14 (Note: finished the season as the league top scorer)
88	(El Salvador) Styven Vásquez	Clausura 2025	8
89	(El Salvador) Elias Gumero	Apertura 2025	7
90	(El Salvador) Cristian Gil	Clausura 2026	11
91	(El Salvador) TBD	Apertura 2026	00
92	(El Salvador) TBD	Clausura 2027	00

==== By competition ====
- Most goals scored in all competitions: TBD – (El Salvador) TBD, Year–Year
- Most goals scored in Primera Division: TBD – (El Salvador) TBD, Year–Year
- Most goals scored in Copa Presidente: TBD – (El Salvador) TBD, Year–Year
- Most goals scored in International competitions: 'TBD – (El Salvador) TBD, Year–Year
- Most goals scored in CONCACAF competitions: TBD – (El Salvador) TBD, Year–Year
- Most goals scored in UNCAF competitions: TBD – (El Salvador) TBD, Year–Year
- Most goals scored in CONCACAF Champions League: TBD – (El Salvador) TBD, Year–Year
- Most goals scored in UNCAF Cup: TBD – (El Salvador) TBD, Year–Year
- Most goals scored in FIFA World Cup: 1 – (El Salvador) TBD, 1982

==== In a single season ====
- Most goals scored in a season in all competitions: TBD – (El Salvador) TBD, Year–Year
- Most goals scored in a single Primera Division season: TBD – (El Salvador) TBD, Year–Year
- Most goals scored in a single Apertura/Clausura season: TBD – (El Salvador) TBD, Year–Year
- Most goals scored in a single Copa Presidente season: TBD – (El Salvador) TBD, Year–Year
- Most goals scored in a single CONCACAF Champions League season: TBD – (El Salvador) TBD, Year–Year
- Most goals scored in a single UNCAF Cup season: 5 – (Brazil) Celio Rodriguez, 1999

==== In a single match ====
- Most goals scored in a League match: 7
  - (El Salvador) Mario Águila Zelaya v Olimpic, 24 December 1950
- Most goals scored in a Copa Presidente match: TBD
  - (El Salvador) TBD v TBD, Day Month Year
- Most goals scored in an Apertura/Clausura match: TBD
  - (El Salvador) TBD v TBD, Day Month Year
- Most goals scored in a CONCACAF Champions League match: 3
  - (Brazil) Fernando Da Moura v Acros Duurly, 21 April 1991
- Most goals scored in a UNCAF Cup match: 2
  - (El Salvador) Manuel Martínez v Comunicaciones, 28 July 2005
    (El Salvador) Manuel Martínez v Comunicaciones, 2 August 2005
    (Brazil) Celio Rodríguez v Saprissa, 17 February 1999

==== Others ====
- Youngest goalscorer: 17 years, 114 days – (El Salvador) TBD v TBD, Year Primera Division, Day Month Year
- Oldest goalscorer: – 38 years, 233 days (El Salvador) TBD v TBD, Year Primera Division, Day Month Year
- Most goals scored in CONCACAF Finals: TBD
  - (El Salvador) (El Salvador) TBD, four in TBD.
- Fastest goal:
  - 12 seconds – (El Salvador) TBD v TND, Primera Division, Day Month Year
- Fastest hat-trick: 8 minutes – (El Salvador) TBD v TBD, Year Primera Division, Day Month Year
- Most hat-tricks in Primera Division: TBD – (El Salvador) TBD, Year-Year
- Most hat-tricks in a single season: TBD – (El Salvador) TBD,2011–12 (7 times in league).
- Most titles won by player with Luis Angel Firpo: Leonel Carcamo (7 titles)

=== Miscellaneous ===
- The highest transfer fee received by the club for a player was $100,000, paid by Club America for Toninho Do Santos in 1991.
- The highest transfer fee paid by the club for a player was TBD, paid to TBD for TBD on TBD.
- Luis Antonio Regalado was the inaugural Firpo player to be called to the El Salvador national football team
- Firpo one of four side to win three consecutive titles 1990-1993

== Notable players ==
=== World Cup players ===
The following World Cup players, played at Firpo at some point during their career. Highlighted players played for Firpo while playing at the World Cup.

- (El Salvador) José Francisco Jovel (Spain 1982)
- (El Salvador) Miguel Ángel Díaz (Spain 1982)
- (El Salvador) Tomás Pineda (Mexico 1970)

=== National team Players ===
The following National football team players, played at Firpo at some point during their career. Highlighted players played for Firpo while playing at the World Cup.

- (Costa Rica) David Diach
- (Costa Rica) Guillermo Otárola
- (Costa Rica) Ramón Luis Rodríguez
- (Costa Rica) William Fisher Salgado
- (Costa Rica) Erick Scott
- (Cuba) Aricheell Hernández
- (Dominican Republic) Óscar Mejía
- (Guatemala) Bobby White
- (Honduras) Pompilio Cacho
- (Jamaica) Jeremie Lynch
- (Nicaragua) Cyril Errington
- (Panama) Nicolás Muñoz
- (Panama) Percival Piggott
- (Panama) Víctor Herrera Piggott
- (Panama) Armando Polo
- (Peru) Frank Palomino
- (Peru) Miguel Seminario
- (Trinidad and Tobago) Ricardo John
- (Trinidad and Tobago) Jomal Williams
- (Uruguay) Washington Olivera
- (Venezuela) Daniel de Oliveira
