= 2022–23 Primera División de El Salvador =

Primera División tournament

Primera División de El Salvador
- Season: 2022–23
- Dates: July 2022 – December 2022 (Apertura), 2023 – 24 May 2023 (Clausura)
- Champions: FAS (Apertura 2022); Season Cancelled (No Champion) (Clausura 2023)
- Relegated: A.D. Chalatenango
- CONCACAF Central American Cup: FAS
- CONCACAF Central American Cup: Águila
- CONCACAF Central American Cup: Jocoro
- Top goalscorer: Apertura: Juan Carlos Argueta (8 goals); Clausura: Dustin Corea (10 goals)
- All statistics correct as of 31 May 2023.

The 2022–23 Primera División de El Salvador, also known as the Liga Pepsi, was the 24th season and 46th and 47th Primera División tournament, El Salvador's top football division, since its establishment of an Apertura and Clausura format. C.D. FAS and TBD are the defending champions of both Apertura and Clausura tournaments respectively. The league will consist of 12 teams. There will be two seasons conducted under identical rules, with each team playing a home and away game against the other clubs for a total of 22 games per tournament. At the end of each half-season tournament, the top six teams in that tournament's regular season standings will take part in the playoffs.

Originally, the Apertura 2022 tournament was scheduled to begin on June 9, but a crisis ensued within the Salvadoran Football Federation that lasted a month and a half, forcing the tournament to be reduced to 16 due to the World Cup in Qatar, which kicked off on November 20.

The champions of Apertura or Clausura with the better aggregate record will qualify for the 2023 CONCACAF Champions League. The other champion, and the runner-up with the better aggregate record will qualify for the 2023 CONCACAF League. Should the same team win both tournaments, both runners-up will qualify for CONCACAF League. Should the final of both tournaments features the same two teams, the semi-finalist with the better aggregate record will qualify for CONCACAF League.

== Teams ==
=== Promotion and relegation ===
A total of 12 teams will contest the league, including 11 sides from the 2021–22 Primera División and 1 promoted from the 2021–22 Segunda División.

Dragon was promoted to the Primera División in June 2022 after defeating A.D. Municipal in a playoff match by a score of 0–0.

C.D. Municipal Limeño was relegated to the 2022–23 Segunda División.

=== Stadiums and locations ===
Location of teams in 2022–2023 Primera División de El Salvador

Team	Location	Stadium	Capacity
A.D. Chalatenango	Chalatenango	Estadio José Gregorio Martínez	15,000
A.D. Isidro Metapán	Metapán	Estadio Jorge Calero Suárez	10,000
Alianza F.C.	San Salvador	Estadio Cuscatlán	53,400
C.D. Águila	San Miguel	Estadio Juan Francisco Barraza	10,000
C.D. Atlético Marte	San Salvador	Estadio Cuscatlán	53,400
Dragon	San Miguel	Estadio Juan Francisco Barraza	10,000
C.D. FAS	Santa Ana	Estadio Óscar Quiteño	17,500
C.D. Luis Ángel Firpo	Usulután	Estadio Sergio Torres	5,000
Platense	Zacatecoluca	Estadio Antonio Toledo Valle	10,000
Once Deportivo	Ahuachapán	Estadio Simeón Magaña	5,000
Jocoro F.C.	Jocoro	Complejo Deportivo Tierra de Fuego	3,000
Santa Tecla F.C.	Santa Tecla	Estadio Las Delicias	10,000

== Notable events ==
=== Notable death from Apertura 2022 season and 2023 Clausura season ===
The following people associated with the Primera Division have died between the middle of 2022 and middle of 2023.

- Saul Lorenzo Rivero (Uruguayan ex coach of FAS, Aguila, Isidro Metapan)
- Nahún Corro Bazan (Mexican, ex Aguila player)
- Kiril Dojčinovski (Macedonian ex coach of LA Firpo, Limeno)
- Romeo Blanco (ex Alianza and Atletico Marte)
- Italo Maldonado (ex ANTEL player)
- Julio César Madrid (ex Dragon player)
- Raúl Corcio Zavaleta (ex Aguila, Santa Anita, Aguila, Sonsonate, Atletico Marte, Limeno)
- Genaro Sermeño (Ex FAS player)
- Remberto Santillana (Ex FAS, Once Lobos and Metapan FC coach)
- Antonio “Chueño” Landaverde (Ex FAS player)
- Francisco Osorto (ex Santiagueno, Limeno player)
- José Angel Guerra "Gallito Guerra" (ex Platense player)
- Ricardo Gambeta Sosa (ex Dragon, ADLER, Fuerte Aguilares and Juventud Olimpica player)
- Nestor Matamala (ex Chilean coach, CD Aguila coach) Muere entrenador chileno y finalista con CD Águila
- Paulo Damasco (ex Brazilian, Santiagueño player ) Falleció en Río de Janeiro el recordado ex futbolista del Santiagueño, Paulo Damasco – Diario El Salvador

=== Change of ownership ===
On 15 April 2022, FAS announced that they had been acquired by American ownership group AMG Sports

=== FESFUT removal and Games suspensions ===
On the 20th of July, The Governmental National Sports Institute (INDES) in association with the Attorney general raided Salvadoran Football Federation (FESFUT) in relation to money laundering and fraudulent administration. INDES issued an administrative resolution ordering the dismissal of FESFUT directors and the creation of a Normalizing Commission.

As a result of this internal crisis, All three main divisions games from round 2 to 4 were suspended due to referees not showing up.

FIFA said that it could suspend El Salvador if its state-led sports institute removes the heads of the Salvadoran Football Federation (FESFUT) in favor of hand-picked officials, according to a letter shared by the federation online.

After a month and a half and with the imposition of a FIFA Regulation Committee in the FESFUT, plus the delivery of credentials by INDES, the first division (as well as the second and third) obtained the green light to be able to resume their tournament, which was interrupted after a disputed date.

The Primera Division announced August 31, 2022, that the season will resume the Apertura 2022 tournament on September 17, 2022.

=== New main sponsor for the league ===
Instituto Nacional de los Deportes (INDES) signed a five-year contract with Primera División de El Salvador for five year, worth 7 millions USD (1.4 million per year). The league will be named as Liga INDES Apertura / Clausura”.

=== Estadio Cuscatlan Tragedy ===
On the 25th May 2023, during the quarter final game between Alianza and FAS an incident occurred which resulted in a crowd crush of fans in the stadium.

According to reports, fans had been sold fake tickets for the game and angry fans attempted to pull down the barricades at the stadiums at the entrance. Twelve people were killed and dozens of others injured.

Authorities were looking at pressing charges against those responsible for the event and the Salvadoran Soccer Federation suspended all the following day's matches in the count.

=== Suspension 2023 Clausura season ===
After the tragedy that occurred on the 25th of May, A reunion was called with FESFUT and members of the Primera División, the decision was made to cancel the 2023 Clausura season, no champion will be crowned and Chalatenango will be relegated.

Alianza will be punished by playing Apertura 2023 and Clausura 2024 seasons behind closed doors, Fined $30,000 United States dollars.

It was announced that FAS (Apertura 2022 Champion), Aguila (Club with the most Accumulated points in the Apertura 2022 and Clausura 2023 season) and Jocoro (Apertura 2022 Runner-up) will be the club representatives at the CONCACAF Central American Cup.

Fiscalía General de la República (El Salvador Police force) arrested the five people responsible for the poor security and issues that contributed to the tragedy, the five arrested included are President of Alianza Pedro Hernández, general manager of Alianza Edwin Abarca, Treasurer of Alianza Zoila Córdova, General manager of EDESSA the ownership group of Estadio Cuscatlán Reynaldo Contreras, and Head of security of EDESSA Samuel Montano.

== Managerial changes ==
=== Before the start of the season ===
Team	Outgoing manager	Manner of departure	Date of vacancy	Replaced by	Date of appointment	Position in table
Jocoro	(El Salvador) Edgar Henriquez	Resigned due to Contract dispute	May 2022	(Colombia) Carlos Estrada	May 2022	th (2022 Apertura)
Santa Tecla	(El Salvador) Leonel Carcamo	Mutual Consent	May 22, 2022	(Argentina) Ernesto Corti	May 22, 2022	12th (2022 Apertura)
Alianza	(El Salvador) Milton Melendez	Resigned	May 2022	(El Salvador) Adonay Martinez	June 27, 2022	th (2022 Apertura)
Platense	(El Salvador) Ivan Ruiz	Ended Intermship and Returned as assistant coach	June 2022	(El Salvador) Erick Prado	June 2022	th (2022 Apertura)
Chalatenango	(El Salvador) Erick Prado	Mutual Consent	June 2022	(El Salvador) Edgar Henriquez	June 2022	th (2022 Apertura)
Atletico Marte	(El Salvador) Nelson Mauricio Ancheta	Sacked	June 2022	(Argentina) Osvaldo Escudero	June 21, 2022	th (2022 Apertura)
Luis Angel Firpo	(Brazil) Eraldo Correia	Mutual Consent	June 2022	(El Salvador) Carlos Romero	June 2022	th (2022 Apertura)
Once Deportivo de Ahuachapan	(Uruguay) Ruben da Silva	Mutual Consent	June 2022	(El Salvador) Rodolfo Gochez	June 2022	th (2022 Apertura)
FAS	(El Salvador) Jorge Humberto Rodriguez	Mutual Consent, Moved to be sporting director	June 10, 2022	(Ecuador) Octavio Zambrano	June 2022	th (2022 Apertura)

=== During the Apertura season ===
Team	Outgoing manager	Manner of departure	Date of vacancy	Replaced by	Date of appointment	Position in table
Aguila	(Peru) Agustin Castillo	Mutual Consent	August 2022	(Argentina) Sebastian Bini	August 2022	9th (2022 Apertura)
Jocoro	(Colombia) Carlos Estrada	Resigned due to family issues	September 6, 2022	(Honduras) Jorge Pineda	September 6, 2022	th (2023 Clausura)
Jocoro	(Honduras) Jorge Pineda	Mutual Consent	October, 2022	(El Salvador) Jose Romero	October, 2022	1st (2023 Clausura)

=== Between the Apertura and Clausura season ===
Team	Outgoing manager	Manner of departure	Date of vacancy	Replaced by	Date of appointment	Position in table
Once Deportivo	(El Salvador) Rodolfo Gochez	Sacked	October 28, 2022	(El Salvador) Erick Dowson Prado	December, 2022	6th Group B (2022 Apertura)
Alianza	(El Salvador) Adonay Martinez	Sacked	November 16, 2022	(Colombia) Eduardo Lara	November 17, 2022	th (2023 Clausura)
Platense	(El Salvador) Erick Dowson Prado	Sacked	November 30, 2022	(Uruguay) Ruben Da Silva	December, 2022	th (2023 Clausura)
Jocoro	(El Salvador) Jose Romero	Sacked	November 30, 2022	(Honduras) Guillermo Bernardez	December 27, 2022	th (2023 Clausura)
Isidro Metapan	(El Salvador) Hector Omar Mejia	Sacked	December 12, 2022	(El Salvador) Jorge Rodriguez	December 13, 2022	th (2023 Clausura)
LA Firpo	(El Salvador) Carlos Romero	Sacked	December, 2022	(El Salvador) Guillermo Rivera	December 21, 2022	th (2023 Clausura)
Chalatenango	(El Salvador) Edgar Henriquez	Mutual consent	December 31, 2022	(El Salvador) Ricardo Serrano	January, 2023	th (2023 Clausura)

=== Clausura seasons ===
Team	Outgoing manager	Manner of departure	Date of vacancy	Replaced by	Date of appointment	Position in table
Jocoro	(Honduras) Guillermo Bernárdez	Resigned due to poor results	February 28, 2023	(El Salvador) Victor Coreas	February 28, 2023	10th (2023 Clausura)
Atletico Marte	(Argentina) Osvaldo Escudero	Mutual Consent	March 4, 2023	(El Salvador) Omar Sevilla	March 4, 2023	11th (2023 Clausura)
Platense	(Uruguay) Ruben Da Silva	Sacked	March 28, 2023	(Spain) Juan Cortés Diéguez	March 29, 2023	10th (2023 Clausura)
FAS	(Ecuador) Octavio Zambrano	Sacked	April 4, 2023	(El Salvador) Efren Mercano (Interim)	April 5, 2023	6th (2023 Clausura)

== Apertura ==
=== Phase 1 ===
==== Group A ====
Pos	Team	Pld	W	D	L	GF	GA	GD	Pts	Qualification or relegation
1	Águila (Q)	10	5	3	2	23	11	+12	18	Advance to Playoffs
2	Jocoro (Q)	10	5	3	2	16	12	+4	18	Advance to Playoffs
3	Dragon (Q)	10	5	3	2	10	7	+3	18	Advance to Playoffs
4	Platense (Q)	10	4	3	3	11	8	+3	15	Advance to Playoffs
5	Chalatenango	10	1	3	6	7	18	−11	6	
6	Firpo	10	0	5	5	6	17	−11	5	

Updated to match(es) played on October 2022. Source:
Rules for classification: 1) points; 2) goal difference; 3) number of goals scored.
(Q) Qualified for the phase indicated

==== Group B ====
Pos	Team	Pld	W	D	L	GF	GA	GD	Pts	Qualification or relegation
1	Alianza (Q)	10	6	1	3	21	11	+10	19	Advance to Playoffs
2	FAS (Q)	10	4	4	2	12	9	+3	16	Advance to Playoffs
3	Isidro Metapán (Q)	10	4	4	2	14	13	+1	16	Advance to Playoffs
4	Atletico Marte (Q)	10	3	3	4	9	14	−5	12	Advance to Playoffs
5	Santa Tecla	10	3	2	5	15	17	−2	11	
6	Once Deportivo	10	1	4	5	9	16	−7	7	

Updated to match(es) played on 24 October 2022. Source:
Rules for classification: 1) points; 2) goal difference; 3) number of goals scored.
(Q) Qualified for the phase indicated

==== Quarterfinals ====
===== First legs =====
28 October 2022
15:00 (UTC-6)

Isidro Metapan	1–1	Jocoro
Carlos Salazar 41'		Henry Romero 91'

Estadio Jorge Calero Suárez
Referee: Cesar Nolasco
27 October 2022
15:15 (UTC-6)

Platense	1–1	Alianza
Steve Alfaro 55'		Ezequiel Rivas 77'

Estadio Antonio Toledo Valle, Zacatecoluca
Referee: Ivan Barton
27 October 2022
19:00 (UTC-6)

Atletico Marte	0–0	Aguila
Nil		Nil

Estadio Cuscatlan
Referee: Ivan Barton
27 October 2022
18:30 (UTC-6)

Dragon	3–2	FAS
Yair Arboleda 39'; Javier Ferman 64'; Jhon Montano 89'		Alberto Henriquez 39'; Rudy Clavel 62'

Estadio Juan Francisco Barraza, San Miguel
Referee: German Martinez

===== Second legs =====
31 October 2022
15:00 (UTC-6)

FAS	3–1	Dragon
Luis Mendoza 3' 67'; Marvin Marquez 78'		Jhon Montaño 56'

Estadio Oscar Alberto Quiteno, Santa Ana
Referee: Jaime Herrera

FAS won 5–4 on Aggregate

31 October 2022
20:00 (UTC-6)

Aguila	1–0	Atletico Marte
Dustin Corea 87'		Nil

Estadio Juan Francisco Barraza, San Miguel
Referee: Geovani Corona

Aguila won 1–0 on Aggregate

31 October 2022
15:00 (UTC-6)

Jocoro	0–0	Isidro Metapan
Nil		Nil

Polideportivo Tierra de Fuego, Jocoro
Referee: Filiberto Martinez

Jocoro won 4–3 on penalties, after tying 1–1 aggregate

31 October 2022
15:00 (UTC-6)

Alianza	0–1	Platense
Nil		Carlos Anzora 39'

Estadio Cuscatlan, San Salvador
Referee: Ismael Alexander Cornejo

Platense won 2–1 on aggregate

==== Semifinals ====
===== First legs =====
2 November 2022
15:00 (UTC-6)

FAS	1–0	Aguila
Wilma Torres 72'		Nil

Estadio Oscar Alberto Quiteno, Santa Ana
Referee: Juan Francisco Quinteros
2 November 2022
15:15 (UTC-6)

Platense	2–0	Jocoro
Jhon Machado 7' 13'		Nil

Estadio Antonio Toledo Valle, Zacatecoluca
Referee: Ivan Barton

===== Second legs =====
12 November 2022
15:00 (UTC-6)

Aguila	1–0	FAS
Dustin Corea 33'		Nil

Estadio Cuscatlan, San Salvador
Referee: Jaime Herrera

4–4. FAS won 4–3 on penalties

12 November 2022
15:15 (UTC-6)

Jocoro	4–2	Platense
Henry Romero 10'; Yuvini Salamanca 12' 22'; Júnior Padilla 19'		Steve Alfaro 15' 38'

Polideportivo Tierra de Fuego, Jocoro
Referee: Jose Vicenete Ruiz

4–4. Jocoro won 4–2 on penalties

==== Final ====
November 14, 2022
15:00 UTC−6
Final

FAS	2–0	Jocoro
Rudy Clavel 26' Yilmar Filigrana 66'		NIL

Estadio Cuscatlán, San Salvador
Attendance: 43,000
Referee: Ivan Barton

FAS
GK	1	(El Salvador) Kevin Carabantes
DF	20	(El Salvador) Ibsen Castro
DF	17	(El Salvador) Roberto Domínguez
DF	28	(El Salvador) Rudy Clavel	26'
DF	12	(El Salvador) Rubén Marroquín	(substituted off) 46'
MF	22	(Argentina) Guillermo Stradella	(substituted off) 62'
MF	5	(El Salvador) Jose Portillo
MF	29	(El Salvador) Rodrigo Rivera
MF	7	(Colombia) Juan Camilo Salazar	(substituted off) 78'
FW	9	(Mexico) Luis Ángel Mendoza	(yellow card) 11' (substituted off) 78'
FW	27	(El Salvador) Marvin Marquez	(substituted off) 34'
Substitutes:
MF	8	(El Salvador) Bryan Landaverde		(substituted on) 62'
MF	11	(El Salvador) Denis Pineda		(substituted on) 78'
DF	16	(El Salvador) Andrés Flores		(substituted on) 46'
MF	21	(El Salvador) Wilma Torres		(substituted on) 78'
FW	15	(Colombia) Yílmar Filigrana		(substituted on) 34' (goal) 66'
Manager:
(Ecuador) Octavio Zambrano

Jocoro
GK	22	(El Salvador) Hector Ramirez
DF	4	(El Salvador) Salvador Galindo	(substituted off) 46' (yellow card) 18'
DF	2	(El Salvador) Carlos Arevalo
DF	19	(El Salvador) Elvis Claros
DF	23	(El Salvador) Nelson Moreno	(substituted off) 75' (yellow card) 33'
MF	5	(El Salvador) Henry Maldonado
MF	10	(El Salvador) Yuvini Salamanca
MF	11	(El Salvador) Ronald Aparicio	(substituted off) 46'
MF	16	(El Salvador) Juan Carlos Argueta
MF	17	(Honduras) Junior Padilla	(substituted off) 75' (yellow card) 69'
FW	23	(Honduras) Henry Romero	(substituted off) 64' (yellow card) 61'
Substitutes:
MF	12	(El Salvador) Enmanuel Hernandez		(substituted on) 75'
MF	27	(El Salvador) Carlos Garcia		(substituted on) 46'
MF	'29	(El Salvador) Joel Turcios		(substituted on) 64'
MF	20	(Paraguay) Roque Caballero		(substituted on) 78'
MF	'24	(Paraguay) Oscar Franco		(substituted on) 75'
Manager:
(El Salvador) Jose Romero

Apertura 2022 champions

19th title

=== Apertura 2022 Records ===
==== Records ====
- Best home records: TBD (00 points out of 33 points)
- Worst home records: TBD (0 points out of 33 points)
- Best away records : TBD (00 points out of 33 points)
- Worst away records : TBD (0 points out of 33 points)
- Most goals scored: Aguila (23 goals)
- Fewest goals scored: Firpo (6 goals)
- Fewest goals conceded : Dragon (7 goals)
- Most goals conceded : Chalatenango (18 goals)

No.	Player	Club	Goals
1	(El Salvador) Juan Carlos Argueta	Jocoro	8
2	(El Salvador) Dustin Corea	Aguila	5
3	(El Salvador) Victor Garcia	Santa Tecla	5
4	(Colombia) Carlos Salazar	Isidro Metapan	5
5	(El Salvador) Gerson Mayen	Aguila	5
6	(El Salvador) Rodolfo Zelaya	Alianza	4
7	(El Salvador) Juan Carlos Portillo	Alianza	4
8	(El Salvador) Ezequiel Rivas	Alianza	4
9	(Colombia) Raul Penaranda	LA Firpo	4
10	(El Salvador) Edagr Cruz	Aguila	3

=== Scoring ===
- First goal of the season: (El Salvador) Juan Carlos Argueta for Jocoro against Atletico Marte, 8 minutes (July 10, 2022)
- First goal by a foreign player: (Argentina) Brian Calabrese for Aguila against Once Deportivo, 55th minutes (July 10, 2022)
- Fastest goal in a match: 2 Minutes
  - (El Salvador) Bryan Paz for Once Deportivo against Santa Tecla (October 2, 2022)
- Goal scored at the latest goal in a match: 90+4 minutes
  - (El Salvador) Dustin Corea goal for Aguila against Platense, (September 19, 2022)
- First penalty Kick of the season: (El Salvador) Miguel Lemus for Chalatenango against LA Firpo, 67th minutes (September 18, 2022)
- Widest winning margin: 6 goals
  - Aguila 6–0 LA Firpo (October 13, 2022)
- First hat-trick of the season: (El Salvador) Bryan Paz for Once Deportivo against Santa Tecla (October 2, 2022)
- First own goal of the season: (El Salvador) Geovanny Henriquez (Chalatenango) for Platense (September 25, 2022)
- Most goals in a match: 6 goals
  - Aguila 6–0 LA Firpo (October 13, 2022)
- Most goals by one team in a match: 6 goals
  - Aguila 6–0 LA Firpo (October 13, 2022)
- Most goals in one half by one team: 4 goals
  - Jocoro 4–2 (4–2) Platense (1st half, November, 2022)
- Most goals scored by losing team: 3 goals
  - TBD 3–5 TBD (, 2022)
- Most goals by one player in a single match: 3 goals
  - (El Salvador) Bryan Paz for Once Deportivo against Santa Tecla (October 2, 2022
    (El Salvador) Juan Carlos Argueta for Jocoro against Chalatenango (October 24, 2022)
- Players that scored a hat-trick':
  - (El Salvador) Bryan Paz for Once Deportivo against Santa Tecla (October 2, 2022)
  - (El Salvador) Juan Carlos Argueta for Jocoro against Chalatenango (October 24, 2022)

== Clausura ==
=== League table ===
Pos	Team	Pld	W	D	L	GF	GA	GD	Pts	Qualification or relegation
1	Águila	22	15	4	3	34	14	+20	49	Advance to Playoffs
2	Alianza	22	10	9	3	32	15	+17	39	Advance to Playoffs
3	Once Deportivo	22	7	10	5	23	17	+6	31	Advance to Playoffs
4	Dragón	22	8	6	8	23	21	+2	30	Advance to Playoffs
5	Firpo	22	6	11	5	20	17	+3	29	Advance to Playoffs
6	Isidro Metapán	22	7	8	7	29	28	+1	29	Advance to Playoffs
7	FAS	22	7	6	9	24	26	−2	27	Advance to Playoffs
8	Jocoro	22	8	3	11	25	36	−11	27	Advance to Playoffs
9	Santa Tecla	22	6	7	9	26	29	−3	25	
10	Chalatenango	22	7	4	11	27	39	−12	25	
11	Atletico Marte	21	5	8	8	25	31	−6	23	
12	Platense	22	5	6	11	24	39	−15	21	

Rules for classification: 1) points; 2) goal difference; 3) number of goals scored.

=== Clausura 2023 Records ===
==== Records ====
- Best home records: TBD (00 points out of 33 points)
- Worst home records: TBD (0 points out of 33 points)
- Best away records : TBD (00 points out of 33 points)
- Worst away records : TBD (0 points out of 33 points)
- Most goals scored: TBD (00 goals)
- Fewest goals scored: TBD (00 goals)
- Fewest goals conceded : TBD (00 goals)
- Most goals conceded : TBD (00 goals)

No.	Player	Club	Goals
1	(El Salvador) Dustin Corea	Aguila	10
2	(Colombia) Luis Peralta	Isidro Metapan	10
3	(Trinidad and Tobago) Jomal Williams	Once Deportivo	9
4	(Colombia) Jhon Montano	Dragon	8
5	(Colombia) Michell Mercado	Alianza	8
6	(El Salvador) Juan Carlos Argueta	Jocoro	8
7	(Paraguay) Luis Ibarra	Atletico Marte	8
8	(El Salvador) Cesar Flores	Santa Tecla	7
9	(Colombia) Carlos Salazar	Isidro Metapan	6
10	(Chile) Sebastian Julio	LA Firpo	6
11	(Colombia) Camilio Salazar	FAS	5
12	(Argentina) Luis Acuna	Jocoro	5

=== Scoring ===
- First goal of the season: (El Salvador) Santos Ortiz for Aguila against Santa Tecla, 16 minutes (January 29, 2023)
- First goal by a foreign player: (Colombia) Victor Landázuri for Santa Tecla against Aguila, 23rd minutes (January 29, 2023)
- Fastest goal in a match: 35 seconds
  - (Argentina) Gabriel Giacopetti for Platense against Atletico Marte, (April 24, 2023)
- Goal scored at the latest goal in a match: 90+7 minutes
  - (Colombia) Michell Mercado goal for Alianza against Platense, (January 30, 2023)
  - (El Salvador) Jaime Ortiz goal for Platense against Santa Tecla, (April 12, 2023)
- First penalty Kick of the season: (Paraguay) Luis Ibarra for Atletico Marte against LA Firpo, 35th minutes (January 30, 2023)
- Widest winning margin: 6 goals
  - Dragon 7–1 Chalatenango (February 12, 2023)
- First hat-trick of the season: (El Salvador) Marcelo Díaz for Once Deportivo against Chalatenango (April 24, 2023)
- First own goal of the season: (El Salvador) Roberto Domínguez (FAS) for Aguila (February 6, 2023)
- Most goals in a match: 8 goals
  - Dragon 7–1 Chalatenango (February 12, 2023)
- Most goals by one team in a match: 7 goals
  - Dragon 7–1 Chalatenango (February 12, 2023)
- Most goals in one half by one team: 4 goals
  - Dragon 4–0 (7–1) Chalatenango (1st half, February 12, 2023)
- Most goals scored by losing team: 3 goals
  - TBD 3–5 TBD (, 2023)
- Most goals by one player in a single match: 3 goals
  - (El Salvador) Marcelo Díaz for Once Deportivo against Chalatenango (April 24, 2023)
- Players that scored a hat-trick:
  - (El Salvador) Marcelo Díaz for Once Deportivo against Chalatenango (April 24, 2023)

=== Playoff ===
==== Quarterfinals ====
===== First legs =====
28 May 2023
15:00 (UTC-6)

LA Firpo	1–1	Dragon
Sebastian Julio 61'		Jonathan Nolasco 74'

Sergio Torres Stadium, Usulutan
27 May 2023
15:15 (UTC-6)

FAS	1–0	Alianza
Camilo Salazar 93'		Nil

Estadio Óscar Quiteño, Santa Ana, El Salvador
27 May 2023
19:00 (UTC-6)

Jocoro	2–3	Aguila
Juan Carlos Argueta 74'; Camilo Delgado 90'		Dustin Corea 13' (pen.); Carlos Pimienta 17'; Dixon Rivas 89'

Polideportivo Tierra de Fuego, Jocoro
27 May 2023
18:30 (UTC-6)

Isidro Metapan	1–0	Once Deportivo
Erivan Flores 13'		Nil

Estadio Jorge Calero Suárez, Metapan

===== Second legs =====
20 May 2023
15:00 (UTC-6)

Dragon	2–1	LA Firpo
Jhon Montaño 27' 62'		Styven Vasquez 65'

Estadio Juan Francisco Barraza, San Miguel

Dragon won 3–2 on Aggregate

20 May 2023
19:30 (UTC-6)

Alianza	0–2	FAS
TBD 87'		Nil

Estadio Cuscatlan, San Salvador

Match Abandoned due to stadium tragedy, FAS awarded a 2–0 victory

21 January 2023
15:00 (UTC-6)

Once Deportivo	1–2	Isidro Metapan
Nil		Nil

Estadio Simeón Magaña, Ahuachapan

Season was cancelled, due to Cuscatlan stadium

21 May 2023
15:30 (UTC-6)

Aguila	0–1(3–4)	Jocoro
Nil		TBD 39'

Estadio Juan Francisco Barraza, San Miguel

Season was cancelled, due to Cuscatlan stadium

== Aggregate table ==
The Aggregate table is the general ranking for the 2022–23 season. This table is a sum of the Apertura 2022 and Clausura 2023 tournament standings. The aggregate table is used to determine seeding for the CONCACAF tournaments and relegation to the Segunda Division.

Pos	Team	Pld	W	D	L	GF	GA	GD	Pts	Qualification or relegation
1	Águila	32	20	7	5	57	25	+32	67	CONCACAF Central American Cup (Note: As non-finalists with best aggregate)
2	Alianza	32	16	10	6	53	26	+27	58	
3	Dragón	32	13	9	10	33	28	+5	48	
4	Isidro Metapán	32	11	12	9	43	41	+2	45	
5	Jocoro	32	13	6	13	41	48	−7	45	CONCACAF Central American Cup (Note: As Apertura runners-up)
6	FAS	32	11	10	11	36	35	+1	43	CONCACAF Central American Cup (Note: As Apertura champions)
7	Once Deportivo	32	8	14	10	31	32	−1	38	
8	Santa Tecla	32	9	9	14	41	44	−3	36	
9	Platense	32	9	9	14	34	47	−13	36	
10	Atletico Marte	32	8	11	13	34	45	−11	35	
11	Firpo	32	6	16	10	26	33	−7	34	
12	Chalatenango	32	8	7	17	34	57	−23	31	Segunda División

Source: primerafutboles.com
Rules for classification: 1) points; 2) goal difference; 3) number of goals scored.

== List of foreign players in the league ==
This is a list of foreign players in the 2022–23 season. The following players:

1. Have played at least one game for the respective club.
2. Have not been capped for the El Salvador national football team on any level, independently from the birthplace

A new rule was introduced this season, that clubs can have four foreign players per club and can only add a new player if there is an injury or a player is released and it is before the close of the season transfer window. \

Águila

- (Argentina) Luis Acuna
- (Argentina) Brian Calabrese
- (Colombia) Edgar Medrano
- (Mexico) Jahir Barraza
- (Trinidad and Tobago) Jomal Williams
- (Argentina) Franco Toloza
- (Argentina) Francisco Aman
- (Uruguay) Carlos Daniel Pimienta
- (Uruguay) Flavio Scarone

Alianza

- (Colombia) Camilo Delgado
- (Colombia) Mitchel Mercado
- (Colombia) Victor Labndazuri
- (Colombia) Camilo Mancilla
- (Colombia) Hugo Palacios
- (Colombia) Miguel Murillo

Atletico Marte

- (Colombia) Luis Arturo Peralta
- (Colombia) Tardelius Pena
- (Colombia) Yeffer Duvan Sanchez
- (Colombia) John Machado
- (Paraguay) Sandro Melgarejo
- (Japan) Sergio Escudero
- (Paraguay) Luis Ibarra

Chalatenango

- (Colombia) Jhony Moran
- (Colombia) Hector Renteria
- (Mexico) Dieter Vargas
- (Nicaragua) Henry Niño
- (Jamaica) Kemal Beckford
- (Ecuador) André Hurtado
- (Ecuador) Dany Cetre
- (Ecuador) Joe Arboleda
- (Ecuador) Eder Moscoso

Dragon

- (Colombia) Kevin Moreno
- (Colombia) Jhon Montaño
- (Colombia) Luis Angulo
- (Colombia) Yair Arboleda

FAS

- (Colombia) Yílmar Filigrana
- (Mexico) Omar Rosas
- (Peru) Pier Larrauri
- (Uruguay) Santiago Carrera
- (Mexico) Luis Ángel Mendoza
- (Argentina) Wilson Gómez
- (Colombia) Juan Camilo Salazar
- (Mexico) Luis Madrigal
- (Panama) Rolando Blackburn

Firpo

- (Brazil) Daniel Floró Da Silva
- (Brazil) Tales Jose da Silva
- (Colombia) Steven Riascos
- (Colombia) Heiner Caicedo
- (Colombia) Raúl Peñaranda
- (Chile) Felipe Andres Brito
- (Chile) Sebastian Julio Munoz
- (Colombia) Tardelius Pena

Isidro Metapán

- (Spain) Gregori Diaz
- (Argentina) Luca Orozco
- (Argentina) Leandro Martin
- (Colombia) Carlos Salazar
- (Colombia) Luis Peralta

Jocoro

- (Honduras) Henry Romero
- (Honduras) Junior Padilla
- (Colombia) Santiago Córdoba
- (Colombia) Diego Angulo
- (Paraguay) Roque Caballero
- (Paraguay) Oscar Franco
- (Argentina) Luis Acuna
- (Colombia) Camilo Delgado
- (Jamaica) Kemal Beckford

Once Deportivo

- (Colombia) Ronald Benavides
- (Mexico) Adrián Muro
- (Argentina) David Boquin
- (Mexico) Jesús Dautt
- (Mexico) José Luis Calderón
- (Trinidad and Tobago) Jomal Williams

Platense

- (Argentina) Juan Marcelo Aimar
- (Colombia) John Machado
- (Argentina) Gabriel Eduardo Giacopetti
- (Colombia) Wilber Arizala
- (Colombia) Briand Andrés Díaz
- (Mexico) Omar Rosas
- (Belize) Krisean Lopez

Santa Tecla

- (Colombia) Victor Labndazuri
- (Mexico) Joel Almeida
- (Colombia) Yessy Mina
- (Mexico) Elio Castro
- (Argentina) Eloy Rodríguez
- (Colombia) Andres Quejeda
- (Uruguay) José Miguel Barreto

(player released during the Apertura season due suspension of season, Never played a game) (player released during the Apertura season) (player released between the Apertura and Clausura seasons) (player released during the Clausura season) (player naturalized for the Clausura season) (player released beginning the Clausura season, Never played a game)
