= Daniel Delgadillo =

Daniel Delgadillo may refer to:

- Daniel Delgadillo (swimmer) (born 1989), Mexican marathon swimmer
- Daniel Delgadillo (footballer) (born 1994), Mexican professional association football player
