= Rolando Torres =

Salvadoran footballer (born 1982)

José Rolando Torres
Personal information
- Full name: José Rolando Torres Mendoza
- Date of birth: December 21, 1982 (age 43)
- Place of birth: Jocoro, El Salvador
- Height: 1.80 m (5 ft 11 in)
- Position: Defender

Senior career*
Years	Team	Apps	(Gls)
1998–2002	Atlético Morazán		
2002–2005	Fuerte San Francisco		
2005–2008	Águila		
2008–2009	Alianza	23	(0)
2009–2011	Municipal Limeño	8	(0)
2012–2016	Águila	36	(3)

International career
2006–2008	El Salvador	13	(0)
- * Club domestic league appearances and goals

José Rolando Torres Mendoza (born 21 December 1982 in Jocoro, El Salvador) is a Salvadoran professional footballer who played as a defender.

== Club career ==
Torres came through at local side Atlético Morazán and has played professionally for Fuerte San Francisco of the Salvadoran Third Division. He then had a couple of years at the country's top level, with Águila and Alianza, before joining Municipal in 2009. He rejoined Águila for the 2012 Clausura.

== International career ==
Torres made his debut for El Salvador in an October 2006 friendly match against Panama and has earned a total of 13 caps, scoring no goals. He has represented his country at the 2007 UNCAF Nations Cup and was a non-playing squad member at the 2007 CONCACAF Gold Cup.

His final international game was an August 2008 friendly match against Trinidad & Tobago.
