= Ányelo Rodríguez =

Uruguayan footballer (born 1995)

Ányelo Paolo Rodríguez Da Silva (born 28 July 1995) is a Uruguayan professional footballer who plays as a midfielder for Primera División club C.D Municipal Limeño.

== Honours ==
ALIANZA F.C.

- Primera División
  - Champion (2): Clausura 2024, 2025 Clausura
