= Rudy Clavel =

Salvadoran footballer

Personal information
- Full name: Rudy Geovanny Clavel Mendoza
- Date of birth: 10 October 1996 (age 30)
- Place of birth: Santa Ana, El Salvador
- Height: 1.80 m (5 ft 11 in)
- Position: Centre-back

Team information
- Current team: FAS
- Number: 28

Youth career
- Isidro Metapán

Senior career*
Years	Team	Apps	(Gls)
2015–2017	Isidro Metapán	41	(1)
2017–2021	Alianza	91	(4)
2021–	FAS	169	(11)

International career^{‡}
2022–	El Salvador	21	(1)
- * Club domestic league appearances and goals as of 22:00, 16 November 2025 (UTC) ‡ National team caps and goals as of 22:00, 16 November 2025 (UTC)

Rudy Geovanny Clavel Mendoza (born 10 October 1996) is a Salvadoran professional footballer who plays as a centre-back for the Salvadoran Primera División club FAS and the El Salvador national team.

== Club career ==
Clavel began his senior career with Isidro Metapán in the Primera División de El Salvador in 2015. He joined Alianza in 2017, where he helped them win 1 Clausura and 3 Apertura's in the Salvadoran Primera División. On 27 June 2021, he transferred to FAS on an initial one-year contract. On 10 January 2023, he extended his contract with FAS, having helped been named their captain and helping them win the 2022 Apertura.

== International career ==
Clavel was first called up to the El Salvador national team on April 19th 2022.

== Personal life ==
Clavel's brother, Fernando Clavel, is also a professional footballer in El Salvador.

== Honours ==
Alianza

- Primera División de El Salvador: 2017 Clausura, 2018 Apertura, 2019 Apertura, 2020 Apertura

FAS

- Primera División de El Salvador: 2022 Apertura
