= Anthony Sosa =

Uruguayan football player (born 1996)

Personal information
- Full name: Anthony Alexis Sosa Martínez
- Date of birth: 27 July 1996 (age 30)
- Place of birth: José Pedro Varela, Uruguay
- Height: 1.77 m (5 ft 10 in)
- Position: Midfielder

Team information
- Current team: Alianza
- Number: 27

Youth career
- –2016: Peñarol
- 2016–2017: Liverpool
- 2017–2018: Nacional

Senior career*
Years	Team	Apps	(Gls)
2015–2016	Peñarol	0	(0)
2015–2016	→ Torque (loan)	8	(0)
2018–2021	Progreso	32	(1)
2019–2020	→ Nacional (loan)	2	(0)
2021–2022	Cerro	31	(1)
2022	Cerrito	9	(0)
2023–2024	Albion	16	(3)
- * Club domestic league appearances and goals as of 19:21, 19 July 2023 (UTC)

Anthony Alexis Sosa Martínez (born 27 July 1996) is a Uruguayan professional footballer who plays as a midfielder for Primera División club Alianza.
