= Lizandro Claros =

Salvadoran footballer (born 1998)

Personal information
- Full name: Lizandro Enmanuel Claros Saravia
- Date of birth: 25 January 1998 (age 28)
- Place of birth: Usulután, El Salvador
- Height: 1.82 m (6 ft 0 in)
- Position: Defender

Team information
- Current team: Luis Ángel Firpo
- Number: 5

Youth career
- Bethesda S.C.
- 2013–2016: Quince Orchard Cougars
- 2017: Louisburg Hurricanes

Senior career*
Years	Team	Apps	(Gls)
2018–2020	Independiente	11	(0)
2020–2021	Luis Ángel Firpo	27	(1)
2021–2022	Águila	31	(0)
2022–2023	São João de Ver	2	(0)
2023	FAS	14	(1)
2023	Luis Ángel Firpo	21	(2)
2024	Limeño	23	(3)
2024–	Luis Ángel Firpo	52	(2)

International career
2021–2022	El Salvador	4	(0)
- * Club domestic league appearances and goals

Lizandro Emmanuel Claros Saravia (born 25 January 1998) is a Salvadoran professional footballer who plays as a defender for Primera División club Luis Ángel Firpo, whom he captains.

== Career ==
He was deported from the United States to El Salvador. Claros started his professional career with Salvadoran side Independiente.

== Personal life ==
After graduating from Quince Orchard High School, went to Louisburg College before he was deported in 2017. His two brothers, Diego and Jonathan, are also football players.
