= Emiliano Villar =

Uruguayan football player (born 1999)

Personal information
- Full name: Emiliano Agustín Villar Vidal
- Date of birth: 21 October 1999 (age 27)
- Place of birth: Colonia del Sacramento, Uruguay
- Height: 1.76 m (5 ft 9 in)
- Position: Forward

Team information
- Current team: Cerro Largo (on loan from Nacional)
- Number: 10

Youth career
- 2003–2017: Atlético El General
- 2017–2018: Boston River

Senior career*
Years	Team	Apps	(Gls)
2018–2020	Boston River	12	(1)
2020	→ Cerro (loan)	12	(2)
2020–	Nacional	10	(1)
2021	→ Rentistas (loan)	24	(4)
2022–	→ Cerro Largo (loan)	56	(7)
- * Club domestic league appearances and goals as of 30 November 2023

Emiliano Agustín Villar Vidal (born 21 October 1999) is a Uruguayan professional footballer who plays as a forward for Cerro Largo, on loan from Nacional.

== Career ==
Villar joined hometown club Atlético El General at the age of four, where he spent majority of his youth career. After homesickness stopped him from completing his trials at Peñarol and Defensor Sporting, he joined Boston River in 2017. He made his professional debut for the club on 10 February 2018 in a 3–1 defeat against Montevideo Wanderers. In January 2020, he joined Cerro on a season long loan deal.

In October 2020, Villar joined Nacional on a permanent deal until the end of 2023 season. On 30 November, he scored the lone goal in Nacional's 1–0 win against Boston River. In April 2021, he joined Rentistas on a season long loan deal.

== Career statistics ==
As of 23 October 2022

Appearances and goals by club, season and competition
Club	Season	League			Cup		Continental		Other		Total	
Club	Season	Division	Apps	Goals	Apps	Goals	Apps	Goals	Apps	Goals	Apps	Goals
Boston River	2018	Uruguayan Primera División	7	0	—		1 (Note: Appearance(s) in Copa Sudamericana.)	0	—		8	0
Boston River	2019	Uruguayan Primera División	5	1	—		—		—		5	1
Boston River	Total		12	1	0	0	1	0	0	0	13	1
Cerro (loan)	2020	Uruguayan Primera División	12	2	—		—		—		12	2
Nacional	2020	Uruguayan Primera División	10	1	—		0	0	1 (Note: Appearance in Torneo Intermedio final.)	0	11	1
Rentistas (loan)	2021	Uruguayan Primera División	24	4	—		4 (Note: Appearances in Copa Libertadores.)	0	—		28	4
Cerro Largo (loan)	2022	Uruguayan Primera División	30	5	0	0	2	0	—		32	5
Career total			88	13	0	0	7	0	1	0	96	13

== Honours ==
Nacional

- Uruguayan Primera División: 2020
