= Yílmar Filigrana =

Colombian footballer (born 1990)

Personal information
- Full name: Yílmar Alexis Filigrana Possu
- Date of birth: 8 November 1990 (age 36)
- Place of birth: Padilla, Colombia
- Height: 1.84 m (6 ft 0 in)
- Position: Forward

Senior career*
Years	Team	Apps	(Gls)
2012	Alianza Petrolera	42	(10)
2013–2016	Deportes Quindío	81	(16)
2017	Coritiba	9	(1)
2018	Atlético Bucaramanga	14	(2)
2019–2022	Deportes Quindío	26	(7)
2022	FAS	11	(2)
2023	Cúcuta Deportivo	12	(2)
2023	Técnico Universitario		
- * Club domestic league appearances and goals as of 19:15, 8 June 2020 (UTC)

Yílmar Alexis Filigrana Possu (born 8 November 1990) is a Colombian professional footballer who plays as a forward.

== Career ==
Filigrana started his career with Alianza Petrolera. His professional debut came playing for Deportes Quindío where he played from 2013 to 2016. In 2017, he joined Brazilian side Coritiba. His first professional goal was against São Paulo in the Campeonato Brasileiro.
