= Ernesto Corti =

Argentine footballer and manager

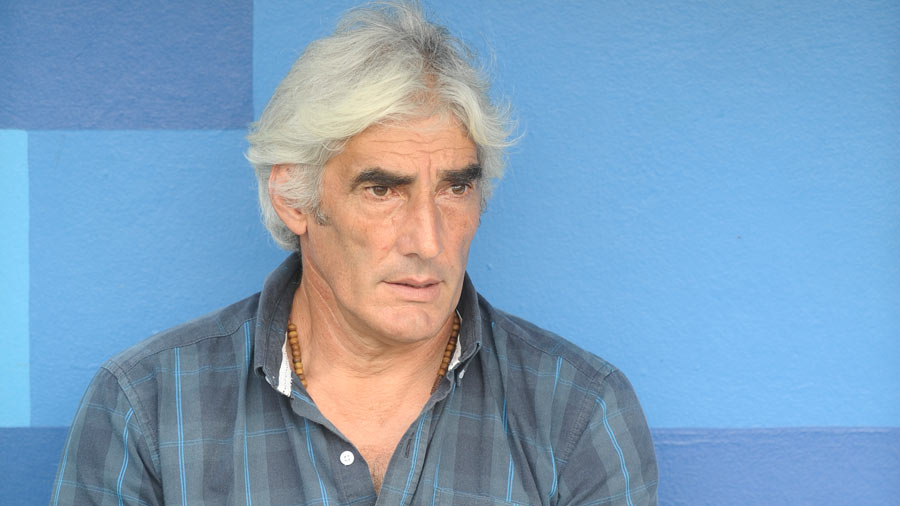
- A picture of Ernesto Corti

Personal information
- Full name: Enrique Ernesto Corti
- Date of birth: 21 March 1963 (age 63)
- Place of birth: Argentina
- Position: Midfielder

Senior career*
Years	Team	Apps	(Gls)
1982–1984	Instituto		
1985	Villa Dálmine		
1985–1987	Instituto		
1987–1990	River Plate	8	(2)
1990–1993	Deportivo Toluca		
1993–1996	River Plate	12	(0)
1996–1998	Instituto		

Managerial career
- 1999–2000, 2001–02: Instituto
- 2000–2010: River Plate (youth team)
- 2013–2016: Deportivo Toluca (youth team)
- 2016–2017: Santa Tecla
- 2017–2020: Deportivo Toluca (assistant manager)
- 2020: Aguila
- 2021: Cobán Imperial
- 2021: Toluca (Assistant)
- 2023-2024: Aguila
- 2025-Present: Alianza
- * Club domestic league appearances and goals

Enrique Ernesto Corti (born 21 March 1963) is an Argentine football manager and former midfielder who last managed for Alianza.

After retiring as a player, he coached teams in Argentina, Mexico and El Salvador.

== Honours ==
=== Club honours ===
==== As a Player ====
- River Plate
  - Argentine Primera División (3): 1989-1990, 1993 Apertura, 1994 Apertura

==== As a coach ====
- Santa Tecla
  - Primera División (2): Apertura 2016, Clausura 2017
  - Copa El Salvador (1): 2016–17
- Aguila
  - Primera División (1): Apertura 2023
- Alianza
  - Primera División (1): 2025 Clausura
