= Diego Gregori =

Spanish footballer

Personal information
- Full name: Diego Gregori Díaz
- Date of birth: 26 July 1995 (age 31)
- Place of birth: Valencia, Spain
- Height: 1.75 m (5 ft 9 in)
- Position: Midfielder

Team information
- Current team: Águila
- Number: 10

Senior career*
Years	Team	Apps	(Gls)
2013–2014	Torre Levante	1	(0)
2014	América de Cali	2	(0)
2015–2017	Envigado	31	(2)
2017–2018	Ibiza	29	(5)
2018–2019	FC Jumilla	19	(1)
2019–2020	Villanovense	27	(5)
2020–2021	Manchego Ciudad Real	20	(2)
2021–2024	Isidro Metapán	136	(16)
2025–	Águila	28	(4)
- * Club domestic league appearances and goals as of 9 March 2025

Diego Gregori Díaz (born 26 July 1995) is a Spanish professional footballer who plays as a midfielder for Salvadoran Primera División club Águila. Besides Spain, he has played in Colombia and El Salvador.

== Career ==
Gregori started his senior career with CF Torre Levante. In 2015, he signed for Envigado in the Colombian Categoría Primera A, where he made 46 appearances and scored three goals. After that, he played for UD Ibiza, Jumilla, and CF Villanovense. In 2021, he signed for Isidro Metapán.
