= Yair Arboleda =

Colombian footballer (born 1998)

Personal information
- Full name: Yair Arboleda Quiñónes
- Date of birth: April 7, 1996 (age 30)
- Place of birth: Tuluá, Colombia
- Height: 1.73 m (5 ft 8 in)
- Position: Winger

Team information
- Current team: Platense
- Number: 31

Youth career
- Santa Fe

Senior career*
Years	Team	Apps	(Gls)
2014	Tijuana	0	(0)
2015–2017	Santa Fe	8	(1)
2016	→ Llaneros (loan)	2	(0)
2016	→ Houston Dynamo (loan)	1	(0)
2016	→ Rio Grande Valley (loan)	7	(1)
2017	→ Atlético Huila (loan)	0	(0)
2017	→ Cúcuta Deportivo (loan)	5	(1)
2019	Bogotá	7	(0)
2020-2021	Unión Comercio	9	(1)
2022	Municipal Limeno		
2022-2023	Dragon		
2024	FAS		
2024	Dragon		
2025	Deportivo Pasto		
2025-	Platense		
- * Club domestic league appearances and goals as of 15:28, 23 June 2021 (UTC)

Yair Arboleda Quiñónes (born 7 April 1998) is a Colombian footballer who plays for Platense.

== Career ==
=== Professional ===
Arboleda began his career with Tijuana in 2014, where he scored 5 goals in 12 appearances for their reserves. He returned to Santa Fe in 2015, before having loan spells with Llaneros and Houston Dynamo in 2016. While with Houston, Arboleda appeared for their United Soccer League affiliate side Rio Grande Valley FC Toros.

== Honours ==
Santa Fe

- Copa Sudamericana: 2015
