= Sebastián Julio =

Chilean footballer (born 1996)

Personal information
- Full name: Sebastián Ignacio Julio Muñoz
- Date of birth: 26 December 1996 (age 29)
- Place of birth: Viña del Mar, Chile
- Position: Striker

Team information
- Current team: Águila

Youth career
- Deportes Santa Cruz

Senior career*
Years	Team	Apps	(Gls)
2016–2017	Deportes Santa Cruz	42	(12)
2018	AC Colina	–	(–)
2019	Deportes Colina	15	(8)
2020	Fernández Vial	2	(0)
2020–2021	Deportes Colina	10	(2)
2021	Independiente Cauquenes	17	(3)
2022	Iberia	7	(0)
2023	Luis Ángel Firpo	39	(18)
2024	Alianza FC	21	(10)
2025	Municipal Limeño	24	(7)
2025–	Águila	0	(0)
- * Club domestic league appearances and goals as of 21 June 2025

Sebastián Ignacio Julio Muñoz (born 26 December 1996) is a Chilean professional footballer who plays as a striker for Salvadoran Primera División club Águila.

== Club career ==
A product of Deportes Santa Cruz youth system, Julio made his professional debut in the 2016 season. In his homeland, he also has played for Deportes Colina, previously AC Colina, Fernández Vial, Independiente de Cauquenes and Deportes Iberia. With AC Colina, he got a promotion to the Segunda División Profesional in the 2018 season, and scored two goals in the first win of the club in a professional league in the 2019 season, under the name of Deportes Colina.

In 2023, Julio moved abroad and signed with Luis Ángel Firpo in the Primera División de El Salvador alongside his compatriot Felipe Brito. The next year, he switched to Alianza FC on a one-year deal. In 2025, he moved to Municipal Limeño and Águila in the second half of the same year.
