= Yair Delgadillo =

Mexican footballer (born 1994)

Personal information
- Full name: Daniel Yair Delgadillo Pulido
- Date of birth: 5 March 1994 (age 32)
- Place of birth: Ciudad Guzmán, Jalisco, Mexico
- Height: 1.85 m (6 ft 1 in)
- Position: Forward

Team information
- Current team: Juticalpa

Youth career
- 2010–2015: Atlas

Senior career*
Years	Team	Apps	(Gls)
2015–2016	Atlas	0	(0)
2015	→ Correcaminos (loan)	8	(0)
2016	→ Tampico Madero (loan)	15	(2)
2016	Atlas Premier	11	(3)
2017	Inter Playa	17	(1)
2017–2018	Tuxtla	30	(9)
2018–2019	Gavilanes	28	(12)
2019–2020	Pioneros	15	(8)
2021	Chiapas	26	(23)
2021–2023	Cancún	51	(9)
2023	→ Santa Lucía (loan)	22	(3)
2023–2024	Municipal Limeño	41	(19)
2024	Isidro Metapan	22	(7)
2025	Victoria	0	(0)
2026	Correcaminos	0	(0)
2026–	Juticalpa	0	(0)
- * Club domestic league appearances and goals as of 21 October 2022

Daniel Yair Delgadillo Pulido (born 5 March 1994) is a Mexican professional footballer who plays as a forward for Liga Hondubet club Juticalpa.
