= Jocoro =

- District
- Flag

- Location in El Salvador
- Coordinates: 13°37′N 88°01′W
- Country: El Salvador
- Department: Morazán Department
- Elevation: 912 ft (278 m)

Population
  - Total: 6,764

Jocoro is a district in the Morazán department of El Salvador.
