= Jomal Williams =

Trinidadian professional association footballer

Personal information
- Full name: Jomal Evans Williams
- Date of birth: 28 April 1994 (age 32)
- Place of birth: Port of Spain, Trinidad, Trinidad and Tobago
- Height: 1.75 m (5 ft 9 in)
- Positions: Winger; forward

Team information
- Current team: Metapan
- Number: 7

Youth career
- 2009–2010: East Mucurapo Secondary
- 2010–2011: Morvant Caledonia United

Senior career*
| Years | Team | Apps | (Gls) |
| 2011–2019 | W Connection | 36 | (18) |
| 2016–2017 | → Murciélagos (loan) | 32 | (3) |
| 2018 | → Zira (loan) | 12 | (1) |
| 2019–2021 | Isidro Metapán | 59 | (18) |
| 2021–2022 | Firpo | 45 | (23) |
| 2022 | Águila | 5 | (0) |
| 2022-23 | Once Deportivo | 33 | (16) |
| 2023-2024 | LA Firpo | 11 | (5) |
| 2024-25 | Once Deportivo | 36 | (6) |
| 2025- | Isidro Metapan | 4 | (3) |

International career^{‡}
| 2010–2011 | Trinidad and Tobago U17 | 6 | (2) |
| 2012 | Trinidad and Tobago U20 | 6 | (2) |
| 2012–2015 | Trinidad and Tobago U23 | 5 | (0) |
| 2015– | Trinidad and Tobago | 21 | (3) |
- * Club domestic league appearances and goals as of 12 September 2023 ‡ National team caps and goals as of 12 September 2023

Jomal Evans Williams (born 28 April 1994) is a Trinidadian professional footballer who plays as a winger for Primera División club Isidro Metapán and the Trinidad and Tobago national team.

Williams' professional career began with W Connection in his native Trinidad and Tobago, where he made his first-team debut in 2011, at the age of 17. During his time with the Savonetta Boys, the team won the TT Pro League title and the FA Trophy during the 2013–14 season. After his fifth season with W Connection, in 2016, he signed his first overseas professional contract with Mexican club Murciélagos.

He is a Trinidad and Tobago international having made his debut in March 2015. Williams has participated in one minor tournament after representing the Soca Warriors in the 2015 Pan American Games.

== Early life ==
Williams was born on 28 April 1994 in Port of Spain, Trinidad and Tobago. Jomal started playing football at the age of seven with local youth club Trendsetter Hawks at the Queen's Park Savannah.

== Club career ==
=== W Connection ===
==== Beginnings and development (2011–2014) ====
In October 2014, Williams had a successful trial with Pau FC of Championnat de France Amateur, the fourth tier in French club football. However, due to the club experiencing financial difficulties, terms could not be agreed upon with parent club W Connection regarding a transfer fee and party responsible for paying the players' salary.

==== Transition to attacking midfielder (2015–2016) ====
Williams returned for the 2015–16 season with W Connection as an attacking midfielder in the first team and changed from the number 40 jersey in favour of number 10. During the 2015–16 CONCACAF Champions League, he made three appearances against Santos Laguna and Saprissa during W Connections's group stage matches. Afterwards, Williams provided five goals during the First Citizens Cup and TOYOTA Classic en route to W Connection claiming both crowns. Consequently, he was named the most valuable player in both cup competitions. One week later, he recorded his first career hat-trick as a professional on 12 December against St. Ann's Rangers. Following his successful month, Williams was named Pro League Player of the Month for December.

In Pro League competition, Jomal benefited from the change in position to a more attacking role, left vacant following Joevin Jones' transfer to Major League Soccer, which led to a breakthrough season as the 21 year-old led the Savonetta Boys with 11 goals – his most Pro League goals in a season. In February 2016, he provided three goals for W Connection en route to finishing runners-up in the 2016 CFU Club Championship and secure qualification for the 2016–17 CONCACAF Champions League.

=== Murciélagos (loan) ===
On 9 June 2016, Williams signed along with former W Connection and international teammate Shahdon Winchester with Mexican club Murciélagos of Ascenso MX prior to the start of the 2016 Apertura for an undisclosed transfer.

=== Zira (loan) ===
On 7 February 2018, Williams signed for Zira FK on loan from W Connection until the end of the 2017/18 season.

== International career ==
Williams has represented Trinidad and Tobago on various levels of international competition, having been capped for the under-17, under-20, under-23 Olympic team, and the Trinidad and Tobago national teams.

=== Youth teams ===
He began his international career for the under-17 team during qualification for the 2011 CONCACAF U-17 Championship, where Jomal scored a pair of goals in the final group stage match against Bermuda. In February 2011, during the continental competition, Williams made an additional two starting appearances against Jamaica and Guatemala, which witnessed Trinidad and Tobago advance to the quarterfinals following a respective draw and win. However, the Soca Warriors would lose in the quarterfinals against Canada.

The following year, Williams was called up to the under-23 team in preparation for their qualification attempt for the 2012 Summer Olympics in London. He made one appearance after coming on as a 76th minute substitute for Mekeil Williams during the final match, which ended in a 2–0 loss against Honduras that eliminated Trinidad and Tobago from the competition. In August 2012, Williams scored two goals in three matches for the under-20 team during their first round of qualification for the 2013 CONCACAF U-20 Championship. However, in November 2012, he made three additional appearances for the Soca Warriors, which witnessed the team finish a disappointing bottom in their final qualification.

In June 2015, Williams made two appearances during another early exit for the under-23 team from qualification for the 2015 CONCACAF Olympic Qualifying Championship following a loss to Saint Vincent and the Grenadines. Although Trinidad and Tobago did not qualify for the 2016 Summer Olympics in Rio de Janeiro, the Soca Warriors participated in the Pan American Games hosted in Toronto the following month. Williams came on as a substitute during the final two matches, which witnessed the Soca Warriors eliminated after three consecutive losses to Uruguay, Paraguay, and Mexico.

=== Senior team ===
International appearances and goals
| # | Date | Venue | Opponent | Result^{†} | Competition | Goal |
|---|---|---|---|---|---|---|
2015
| 1 | 27 March | Ato Boldon Stadium, Couva, Trinidad and Tobago | Panama | 0–1 | International Friendly | |
2016
| 2 | 19 March | Grenada National Stadium, St. George's, Grenada | Grenada | 2–2 | International Friendly | |
| 3 | 23 May | Estadio Nacional, Lima, Peru | Peru | 0–4 | International Friendly | |
| 4 | 27 May | Estadio Centenario, Montevideo, Uruguay | Uruguay | 1–3 | International Friendly | 1 (1) |
| 5 | 3 June | Qinhuangdao Olympic Sports Center Stadium, Qinhuangdao, China | China | 2–4 | International Friendly | |
^{†}Trinidad and Tobago's goal tally first.

==== International debut and first goal (2015–present) ====
Williams made his full international debut for the national team on 27 March 2015, at the age of 20, having come on as a substitute for Shannon Gomez in the 77th minute against Panama. After an impressive form for his club W Connection during the 2015–16 season, Williams was called up for a friendly match against Grenada in St. George's. Two months later, he made an additional three appearances for the Soca Warriors, including two starts as winger. In particular, Williams scored his first international goal on 27 May 2016 against Uruguay in Montevideo at the historic Estadio Centenario.

== Career statistics ==
=== Club ===
As of 10 August 2016

| Club | Season | League | | | Cup | | League Cup (Note: Includes appearances in the Trinidad and Tobago's Classic, Goal Shield, and Pro Bowl) | | Continental (Note: Includes appearances in the CONCACAF Champions League) | | Other (Note: Includes appearances in the Trinidad and Tobago Charity Shield and CFU Club Championship) | | Total | |
| Club | Season | Division | Apps | Goals | Apps | Goals | Apps | Goals | Apps | Goals | Apps | Goals | Apps | Goals |
|---|---|---|---|---|---|---|---|---|---|---|---|---|---|---|
| W Connection | 2011–12 | TT Pro League | 10 | 0 | 0 | 0 | 1 | 0 | 0 | 0 | 0 | 0 | 11 | 0 |
| W Connection | 2012–13 | TT Pro League | 9 | 1 | 0 | 0 | 0 | 0 | 1 | 0 | 0 | 0 | 10 | 1 |
| W Connection | 2013–14 | TT Pro League | 4 | 2 | 4 | 3 | 1 | 1 | 2 | 0 | 0 | 0 | 11 | 6 |
| W Connection | 2014–15 | TT Pro League | 0 | 4 | 4 | 1 | 3 | 0 | 0 | 0 | 4 | 1 | 11 | 6 |
| W Connection | 2015–16 | TT Pro League | 13 | 11 | 0 | 0 | 11 | 6 | 3 | 0 | 5 | 3 | 32 | 20 |
| W Connection | Total | | 36 | 18 | 8 | 4 | 16 | 7 | 6 | 0 | 9 | 4 | 75 | 33 |
| Murciélagos | 2016–17 | Ascenso MX | 2 | 0 | 2 | 1 | | | 0 | 0 | 0 | 0 | 4 | 1 |
| Murciélagos | Total | | 2 | 0 | 2 | 1 | | | 0 | 0 | 0 | 0 | 4 | 1 |
| Career total | | | 38 | 18 | 10 | 5 | 16 | 7 | 6 | 0 | 9 | 4 | 79 | 34 |

=== International ===
As of 3 June 2016

==== International appearances ====
| National team | Year | Friendly | | Competitive | | Total | |
| National team | Year | Apps | Goals | Apps | Goals | Apps | Goals |
|---|---|---|---|---|---|---|---|
| Trinidad and Tobago | 2015 | 1 | 0 | 0 | 0 | 1 | 0 |
| Trinidad and Tobago | 2016 | 4 | 1 | 0 | 0 | 4 | 1 |
| Total | | 5 | 1 | 0 | 0 | 5 | 1 |

==== International goals ====
Scores and results list Trinidad and Tobago's goal tally first.

| Goal | Date | Venue | Cap | Opponent | Score | Result | Competition |
|---|---|---|---|---|---|---|---|
| 1. | 27 May 2016 | Estadio Centenario, Montevideo, Uruguay | 4 | Uruguay | 1–0 | 1–3 | Friendly |
| 2. | 3 June 2016 | Qinhuangdao Olympic Sports Center Stadium, Qinhuangdao, China | 5 | China | 2–3 | 2–4 | Friendly |
| 3. | 10 November 2019 | Ato Boldon Stadium, Couva, Trinidad and Tobago | 18 | Anguilla | 1–0 | 15–0 | Friendly |

== Honours ==
=== Club ===
W Connection

- TT Pro League (1): 2013–14
- FA Trophy (1): 2013–14
- First Citizens Cup (1): 2015
- TOYOTA Classic (1): 2015
- Digicel Pro Bowl (1): 2014

=== Individual ===
==== Awards ====
- Man of the Match (2): 2015 First Citizens Cup, 2015 TOYOTA Classic
- TT Pro League Player of the Month (1): December 2015
