= 2026 Copa Presidente (El Salvador) =

2026 association football tournament in El Salvador

Tournament details
- Country: El Salvador
- Dates: 10 February – November 2026
- Teams: 24

Tournament statistics
- Matches played: 52
- Goals scored: 138 (2.65 per match)
- Top goal scorers: Bryan Cea (Izalco); Andrés Rivas (Inter FA); (5 goals each)
- All statistics correct as of 23 April 2026.

The 2026 Copa Presidente is a 24-team association football tournament in El Salvador. The tournament is scheduled to be held from 10 February to November. It is the first Copa Presidente to be held in El Salvador since 2018–19.

== Participants ==
The 2026 Copa Presidente will feature all 12 clubs from the First Division, 6 from the Second Division, and 6 from the Third Division. Groups will be drawn on 20 January 2026. The following clubs will participate in the 2026 Copa Presidente.

Team	Appearances	Last appearance	Previous best performance
First Division (12 teams)
Águila	5	2018–19	Champions (1999–2000)
Alianza	5	2018–19	Semifinals (2005, 2016–17, 2018–19)
Cacahuatique	1	2018–19	Round 1 (2018–19)
FAS	4	2018–19	Runners-up (2016–17)
Firpo	4	2018–19	Runners-up (1999–2000)
Fuerte San Francisco	3	2005	Group stage (1999–2000, 2005)
Hércules	Debut	–	–
Isidro Metapán	5	2018–19	Quarterfinals (1999–2000, 2005, 2006, 2016–17)
Inter FA	Debut	–	–
Limeño	5	2018–19	Quarterfinals (2016–17)
Platense	3	2018–19	Round 4 (2005)
Zacatecoluca	Debut	–	–
Second Division (6 teams)
Batanecos	Debut	–	–
Cruzeiro	Debut	–	–
Dragón	4	2018–19	Quarterfinals (2006)
Fuerte Aguilares	1	2006	Round 1 (2006)
Sensunte Cabañas	Debut	–	–
Talleres Jr.	Debut	–	–
Third Division (6 teams)
El Roble	1	2016–17	Round 2 (2016–17)
Izalco	Debut	–	–
Once Municipal	4	2016–17	Champions (2006)
Racing de Gualuca	Debut	–	–
Tenancingo	Debut	–	–
Vendaval	4	2018–19	Round 2 (2006, 2018–19)

== Group stage ==
The group stage draw occurred on 21 January. Matchday 1 fixtures were announced on 27 January. There were three match days for the group stage: 10–12 February, 24–26 January, and 10–12 March.

Number of teams per tier still in competition
First Division (1)	Second Division (2)	Third Division (3)	Total
12 / 12	6 / 6	6 / 6	24 / 24

=== Eastern Zone ===
==== Group A ====
Pos	Team	Pld	W	D	L	GF	GA	GD	Pts	Qualification
1	(I) Limeño	3	1	2	0	4	3	+1	5	Advance to the Round of 16
2	(I) Platense	3	1	1	1	4	3	+1	4	Advance to the Round of 16
3	(II) Cruzeiro	3	0	3	0	1	1	0	3	
4	(III) Tenancingo	3	0	2	1	2	4	−2	2	

Source: FESFUT
11 February 2026
15:00

Cruzeiro (II)	1–1	(I) Limeño
O. Rodríguez 78'	Report	J.C. Argueta 24'

Jiboa Stadium, San Vicente
11 February 2026
15:30

Tenancingo (III)	1–3	(I) Platense
S. López 39' (pen.)	Report	Arboleda 11'; F. Martínez 42'; X. García 76'

Mauricio Vides Stadium, Ilobasco

25 February 2026
15:00

Cruzeiro (II)	0–0	(I) Platense
	Report

Jiboa Stadium, San Vicente
25 February 2026
19:00

Tenancingo (III)	1–1	(I) Limeño
K. Martínez 45+1'	Report	Ramos 41'

Mauricio Vides Stadium, Ilobasco

10 March 2026
15:00

Tenancingo (III)	0–0	(II) Cruzeiro
	Report

Mauricio Vides Stadium, Ilobasco
11 March 2026
15:00

Platense (I)	1–2	(I) Limeño
X. García 48'	Report	Je. Martínez 67'; R. López 81'

Antonio Toledo Valle Stadium, Zacatecoluca

==== Group B ====
Pos	Team	Pld	W	D	L	GF	GA	GD	Pts	Qualification
1	(I) Águila	3	3	0	0	7	1	+6	9	Advance to the Round of 16
2	(I) Fuerte San Francisco	3	1	1	1	6	4	+2	4	Advance to the Round of 16
3	(II) Dragón	3	1	1	1	5	7	−2	4	Advance to the Round of 16
4	(III) Racing de Gualuca	3	0	0	3	0	6	−6	0	

Source: FESFUT
11 February 2026
15:00

Dragón (II)	1–4	(I) Águila
Méndez 40' (pen.)	Report	Ja. Martínez 3'; Andrada 24'; Gutiérrez 51'; Gregori 79'

Juan Francisco Barraza Stadium, San Miguel
12 February 2026
15:00

Racing de Gualuca (III)	0–3 (w/o) (Note: On 16 February 2026, the Salvadoran Football Federation Disciplinary Committee awarded three Matchday 1 matches to Batanecos, Fuerte San Francisco, and Sensunte Cabañas with a 3–0 final score due to "irregularities".)	(I) Fuerte San Francisco
Galeas 18' (voided)	Report	E. Sánchez 44' (voided); Mancía 90+2' (voided)

César Antonio Angulo Field, El Tránsito

26 February 2026
15:00

Racing de Gualuca (III)	0–1	(II) Dragón
	Report	Alfaro 90+1'

César Antonio Angulo Field, El Tránsito
26 February 2026
15:00

Fuerte San Francisco (I)	0–1	(I) Águila
	Report	Garay 63'

Correcaminos Stadium, San Francisco Gotera

11 March 2026
15:00

Dragón (II)	3–3	(I) Fuerte San Francisco
González 40' (o.g.); Alfaro 45'; Y. Tobar 79'	Report	Gallardo 29', 37'; González 79'

Juan Francisco Barraza Stadium, San Miguel
12 March 2026
15:00

Racing de Gualuca (III)	0–2	(I) Águila
	Report	Turcios 30'; A. Martínez 83'

César Antonio Angulo Field, El Tránsito

==== Group C ====
Pos	Team	Pld	W	D	L	GF	GA	GD	Pts	Qualification
1	(I) Cacahuatique	3	2	0	1	7	2	+5	6	Advance to the Round of 16
2	(III) El Roble	3	1	1	1	5	5	0	4	Advance to the Round of 16
3	(I) Firpo	3	1	1	1	2	4	−2	4	Advance to the Round of 16
4	(II) Sensunte Cabañas	3	1	0	2	3	6	−3	3	

Source: FESFUT
10 February 2026
15:20 (Note: The match between Sensunte Cabañas and Firpo was delayed 20 minutes due to the National Institute of Sports of El Salvador not delivering Firpo's jerseys on time.)

Sensunte Cabañas (II)	3–0 (w/o)	(I) Firpo
	Report	Gumero 29' (voided)

Sensuntepeque Sports Center, Sensuntepeque
11 February 2026
17:00

El Roble (III)	1–4	(I) Cacahuatique
Ke. Echeverría 90+3'	Report	Palacios 28'; Umeres 29'; Ulloa 65'; Hinestroza 86'

Mauricio Vides Stadium, Ilobasco

24 February 2026
19:00

El Roble (III)	3–0	(II) Sensunte Cabañas
Lara 3', 48'; D. Vásquez 59'	Report

Mauricio Vides Stadium, Ilobasco
25 February 2026
15:00

Cacahuatique (I)	0–1	(I) Firpo
	Report	M. Ferreira 61'

Chapeltique Sports Center, Ciudad Barrios

10 March 2026
19:00

El Roble (III)	1–1	(I) Firpo
C. García 90+3'	Report	M. Ferreira 90+6'

Mauricio Vides Stadium, Ilobasco
11 March 2026
15:00

Sensunte Cabañas (II)	0–3	(I) Cacahuatique
	Report	Ulloa 61', 81'; Márquez 87'

Sensuntepeque Sports Center, Sensuntepeque

=== Western Zone ===
==== Group D ====
Pos	Team	Pld	W	D	L	GF	GA	GD	Pts	Qualification
1	(II) Batanecos	3	2	0	1	4	1	+3	6	Advance to the Round of 16
2	(I) Alianza	3	1	2	0	6	5	+1	5	Advance to the Round of 16
3	(I) Zacatecoluca	3	1	1	1	4	6	−2	4	Advance to the Round of 16
4	(III) Vendaval	3	0	1	2	2	4	−2	1	

Source: FESFUT
12 February 2026
15:00

Vendaval (III)	2–2	(I) Alianza
Hidalgo 43'; L. Martínez 61'	Report	Castillo 83'; Maldonado 90+4'

Joaquín Gutiérrez Stadium, Apopa
12 February 2026
15:00

Batanecos (II)	3–0 (w/o)	(I) Zacatecoluca
	Report

Juan Francisco Molina Stadium, San Sebastián

24 February 2026
15:00

Batanecos (II)	0–1	(I) Alianza
	Report	Portillo 90+2'

Juan Francisco Molina Stadium, San Sebastián
25 February 2026
15:00

Vendaval (III)	0–1	(I) Zacatecoluca
	Report	A. Rodríguez 20'

Joaquín Gutiérrez Stadium, Apopa

12 March 2026
15:00

Vendaval (III)	0–1	(II) Batanecos
	Report	Velasco 67'

Joaquín Gutiérrez Stadium, Apopa
12 March 2026
19:00

Zacatecoluca (I)	3–3	(I) Alianza
Alfaro 28'; Ki. Echeverría 65'; Mier 81'	Report	Guardado 9'; Ki. Echeverría 21' (o.g.); L. Tobar 71' (pen.)

Antonio Toledo Valle Stadium, Zacatecoluca

==== Group E ====
Pos	Team	Pld	W	D	L	GF	GA	GD	Pts	Qualification
1	(I) Inter FA	3	2	1	0	8	3	+5	7	Advance to the Round of 16
2	(I) Isidro Metapán	3	2	1	0	4	1	+3	7	Advance to the Round of 16
3	(II) Talleres Jr.	3	1	0	2	3	5	−2	3	
4	(III) Once Municipal	3	0	0	3	1	7	−6	0	

Source: FESFUT
10 February 2026
15:00

Once Municipal (III)	1–4	(I) Inter FA
Román 51'	Report	Rivas 45+3', 55'; Escobar 73'; Guerra 79'

Simeón Magaña Stadium, Ahuachapán
12 February 2026
19:00

Talleres Jr. (II)	0–2	(I) Isidro Metapán
	Report	Anzora 13'; Machado 69'

José Gregorio Martínez Stadium, Chalatenango

24 February 2026
15:00

Once Municipal (III)	0–2	(II) Talleres Jr.
	Report	J. Grande 70'; Gil 90+1' (pen.)

Simeón Magaña Stadium, Ahuachapán
26 February 2026
19:00

Inter FA (I)	1–1	(I) Isidro Metapán
Tapias 45'	Report	M. Erazo 30'

Las Delicias Stadium, Santa Tecla

10 March 2026
15:00

Once Municipal (III)	0–1	(I) Isidro Metapán
	Report	Miranda 82'

Simeón Magaña Stadium, Ahuachapán
11 March 2026
19:00

Talleres Jr. (II)	1–3	(I) Inter FA
D. Guevara 33'	Report	Rivas 28', 36'; Umaña 46'

José Gregorio Martínez Stadium, Chalatenango

==== Group F ====
Pos	Team	Pld	W	D	L	GF	GA	GD	Pts	Qualification
1	(I) FAS	3	2	1	0	6	3	+3	7	Advance to the Round of 16
2	(I) Hércules	3	1	2	0	6	4	+2	5	Advance to the Round of 16
3	(III) Izalco	3	1	1	1	6	5	+1	4	Advance to the Round of 16
4	(I) Fuerte Aguilares	3	0	0	3	1	7	−6	0	

Source: FESFUT
10 February 2026
15:00

Izalco (III)	2–0	(II) Fuerte Aguilares
Hernández 29', 52'	Report

Salvador Mariona Stadium, Izalco
10 February 2026
17:00

Hércules (I)	1–1	(I) FAS
Olivia 81'	Report	J. Guevara 61'

Las Delicias Stadium, Santa Tecla

24 February 2026
15:00

Izalco (III)	2–3	(I) FAS
Cea 60'; G. Martínez 84'	Report	Santamaría 20'; Funes 45'; Cartagena 62'

Salvador Mariona Stadium, Izalco
26 February 2026
15:00

Fuerte Aguilares (II)	1–3	(I) Hércules
B. Erazo 18'	Report	L. Vásquez 42'; Rivera 56'; Leonor 81'

Aguilares Sporting Complex, Aguilares

10 March 2026
15:00

Fuerte Aguilares (II)	0–2	(I) FAS
	Report	E. Meléndez 35'; Santamaría 76'

Aguilares Sporting Complex, Aguilares
12 March 2026
15:00

Izalco (III)	2–2	(I) Hércules
Cea 20' (pen.), 50'	Report	Velásquez 61'; Chévez 86'

Salvador Mariona Stadium, Izalco

=== Third-place team rankings ===
Pos	Team	Pld	W	D	L	GF	GA	GD	Pts	Qualification
1	(III) Izalco	3	1	1	1	6	5	+1	4	Advance to the Round of 16
2	(II) Dragón	3	1	1	1	5	7	−2	4	Advance to the Round of 16
3	(I) Zacatecoluca	3	1	1	1	4	6	−2	4	Advance to the Round of 16
4	(I) Firpo	3	1	1	1	2	4	−2	4	Advance to the Round of 16
5	(II) Cruzeiro	3	0	3	0	1	1	0	3	
6	(II) Talleres Jr.	3	1	0	2	3	5	−2	3	

Source: FESFUT

== Knockout stage ==
The knockout stage of the 2026 Copa President will consist of a round of 16, quarterfinals, semifinals, and the final. The former three will consist of two-legged ties (home and away) while the final will be a single match. The legs for the round of 16 were from 7–9 and 21–23 April.

=== Qualified teams ===
The following teams qualified for the knockout stage. The draw for the Round of 16 occurred on 27 March 2026.

Group	First	Second	Third
A	(I) Limeño	(I) Platense	—N/a
B	(I) Águila	(I) Fuerte San Francisco	(II) Dragón
C	(I) Cacahuatique	(III) El Roble	(I) Firpo
D	(II) Batanecos	(I) Alianza	(I) Zacatecoluca
E	(I) Inter FA	(I) Isidro Metapán	—N/a
F	(I) FAS	(I) Hércules	(III) Izalco

=== Bracket ===
Round of 16
(II) Batanecos	0	0	0
(I) Firpo	2	3	5
(I) Alianza	3	1	4
(I) Isidro Metapán	1	1	2
(I) Limeño	0	2	2
(III) El Roble	0	1	1
(I) Águila	4	4	8
(III) Izalco	2	1	3
(I) FAS	5	4	9
(II) Dragón	1	1	2
(I) Platense	1	0	1
(I) Fuerte San Francisco	1	1	2
(I) Cacahuatique	2	0	2 (4)
(I) Hércules	0	2	2 (2)
(I) Inter FA	4	2	6
(I) Zacatecoluca	0	1	1

Quarterfinals
(I) Firpo
(I) Alianza
(I) Limeño
(I) Águila
(I) FAS
(I) Fuerte San Francisco
(I) Cacahuatique
(I) Inter FA

Semifinals

Final

=== Round of 16 ===
Number of teams per tier still in competition
First Division (1)	Second Division (2)	Third Division (3)	Total
12 / 12	2 / 6	2 / 6	16 / 24

7 April 2026
15:00

Dragón (II)	1–5	(I) FAS
B. Argueta 66'	Report	Santamaría 15', 24'; Melgar 36'; Santana 42'; C. Guevara 74'

Juan Francisco Barraza Stadium, San Miguel
21 April 2026
19:00

FAS (I)	4–1	(II) Dragón
D. Grande 32', 45'; Murgas 64', 88'	Report	Z. Meléndez 75'

Óscar Quiteño Stadium, Santa Ana

(I) FAS won 9–2 on aggregate.

7 April 2026
17:00

Zacatecoluca (I)	0–4	(I) Inter FA
	Report	Coca 17'; Henríquez 65', 77'; Rivas 74'

Estadio Las Delicias, Santa Tecla
22 April 2026
17:00

Inter FA (I)	2–1	(I) Zacatecoluca
Umaña 74'; H. Benítez 85'	Report	Meir 83'

Estadio Las Delicias, Santa Tecla

(I) Inter FA won 6–1 on aggregate.

7 April 2026
19:00

Alianza (I)	3–1	(I) Isidro Metapán
Moura 18'; Menjívar 22'; L. Tobar 75'	Report	Urrutia 80'

Jorge "El Mágico" González Stadium, San Salvador
21 April 2026
17:00

Isidro Metapán (I)	1–1	(I) Alianza
Urrutia 25'	Report	Portillo 78'

Jorge Suárez Landaverde Stadium, Metapán

(I) Alianza won 4–2 on aggregate.

8 April 2026
15:00

Izalco (III)	2–4	(I) Águila
Cea 2'; Dueñas 49'	Report	Pineda 24'; J. Turcios 55'; Garay 64', 70'

Salvador Mariona Stadium, Izalco
22 April 2026
15:00

Águila (I)	4–1	(III) Izalco
Cruz 3'; T. Benítez 40'; Andrada 60'; Garay 61'	Report	Cea 73'

Juan Francisco Barraza Stadium, San Miguel

(I) Águila won 8–3 on aggregate.

8 April 2026
15:00

Batanecos (II)	0–2	(I) Firpo
	Report	B. Martínez 4'; Marín 22' (o.g.)

Juan Francisco Molina Stadium, San Sebastián
22 April 2026
19:00

Firpo (I)	3–0	(II) Batanecos
M. Ferreira 4'; V. García 20'; Morales 80'	Report

Sergio Torres Stadium, Usulután

(I) Firpo won 5–0 on aggregate.

8 April 2026
19:00

Hércules (I)	0–2	(I) Cacahuatique
	Report	A. Ferreira 51'; Hinestroza 90+2'

Estadio Las Delicias, Santa Tecla
23 April 2026
13:00

Cacahuatique (I)	0–2	(I) Hércules
	Report	Leonor 66'; Rivera 79'
Penalties
Márquez (penalty scored); Ulloa (penalty scored); Umeres (penalty scored); L. Rodríguez (penalty scored)	4–2	(penalty scored) K. Hernández; (penalty scored) Chévez; (penalty missed) Aguilar; (penalty missed) Rosales

Chapeltique Municipal Stadium, Chapeltique

2–2 on aggregate; (I) Cacahuatique won 4–2 on penalties.

9 April 2026
15:00

Platense (I)	1–1	(I) Fuerte San Francisco
Esquivel 55' (o.g.)	Report	Quiñónez 78'

Antonio Toledo Valle Stadium, Zacatecoluca
21 April 2026
15:00

Fuerte San Francisco (I)	1–0	(I) Platense
Gallardo 28'	Report

Correcaminos Stadium, San Francisco Gotera
Referee: Raúl Fermín Morales (FESFUT)

(I) Fuerte San Francisco won 2–1 on aggregate.

9 April 2026
19:00

El Roble (III)	0–0	(I) Limeño
	Report

Mauricio Vides Stadium, Ilobasco
23 April 2026
19:00

Limeño (I)	2–1	(III) El Roble
Torres 32', 71'	Report	C. Martínez 58'

José Ramón Flores Stadium, Santa Rosa de Lima

(I) Limeño won 2–1 on aggregate.

=== Quarterfinals ===
The quarterfinals for the 2026 Copa President were originally scheduled to take place from 1–3 September (first leg) and 6–8 October (second leg). On 21 August, FESFUT changed the date of the first leg to 6–8 October and the second leg to 13–15 October due to the participation of Alianza, FAS, and Firpo in the 2026 CONCACAF Central American Cup.

Number of teams per tier still in competition
First Division (1)	Second Division (2)	Third Division (3)	Total
8 / 12	0 / 6	0 / 6	8 / 24

6, 7, or 8 October 2026

v

13, 14, or 15 October 2026

v

6, 7, or 8 October 2026

v

13, 14, or 15 October 2026

v

6, 7, or 8 October 2026

v

13, 14, or 15 October 2026

v

6, 7, or 8 October 2026

v

13, 14, or 15 October 2026

v

=== Semifinals ===
October 2026

v

October 2026

v

October 2026

v

October 2026

v

=== Final ===
November 2026

v

== Goalscorers ==
There have been 138 goals scored in 52 matches, for an average of 2.65 goals per match (as of 23 April 2026). Players highlighted in bold are still active in the competition.

5 goals

- (El Salvador) Bryan Cea (Izalco)
- (El Salvador) **Andrés Rivas** (Inter FA)

4 goals

- (El Salvador) **Carlos Garay** (Águila)
- (El Salvador) **Kevin Santamaría** (FAS)

3 goals

- (Paraguay) **Marcelo Ferreira** (Firpo)
- (El Salvador) **Joshua Gallardo** (Fuerte San Francisco)
- (El Salvador) **Paolo Ulloa** (Cacahuatique)

2 goals

- (El Salvador) Joshua Alfaro (Dragón)
- (Argentina) **Federico Andrada** (Águila)
- (El Salvador) Xavier García (Platense)
- (United States) **Diego Grande** (FAS)
- (El Salvador) **Jairo Henríquez** (Inter FA)
- (El Salvador) Herbyn Hernández (Izalco)
- (Colombia) **Luis Hinestroza** (Cacahuatique)
- (El Salvador) David Lara (El Roble)
- (El Salvador) Kevin Leonor (Hércules)
- (Uruguay) Matías Mier (Zacatecoluca)
- (El Salvador) **Byron Murgas** (FAS)
- (El Salvador) **Juan Carlos Portillo** (Alianza)
- (El Salvador) Rodrigo Rivera (Hércules)
- (El Salvador) **Luis Tobar** (Alianza)
- (El Salvador) **Wilma Torres** (Limeño)
- (El Salvador) **Joel Turcios** (Águila)
- (El Salvador) **Michael Umaña** (Inter FA)
- (Colombia) Jhonathan Urrutia (Isidro Metapán)

1 goal

- (El Salvador) Melvin Alfaro (Zacatecoluca)
- (El Salvador) Carlos Anzora (Isidro Metapán)
- (Colombia) Yair Arboleda (Platense)
- (El Salvador) Bryan Argueta (Dragón)
- (El Salvador) **Juan Carlos Argueta** (Limeño)
- (El Salvador) **Hamilton Benítez** (Inter FA)
- (El Salvador) **Tereso Benítez** (Águila)
- (United States) **Josue Cartagena** (FAS)
- (El Salvador) **Francis Castillo** (Alianza)
- (El Salvador) Diego Chévez (Hércules)
- (El Salvador) **Diego Coca** (Inter FA)
- (El Salvador) **Eduardo Cruz** (Águila)
- (El Salvador) René Dueñas (Izalco)
- (El Salvador) Kevin Echeverría (El Roble)
- (El Salvador) Kilmar Echeverría (Zacatecoluca)
- (El Salvador) **Francisco Escobar** (Inter FA)
- (El Salvador) Brayan Erazo (Fuerte Aguilares)
- (El Salvador) Mario Erazo (Isidro Metapán)
- (El Salvador) **Alesson Ferreira** (Cacahuatique)
- (El Salvador) **David Funes** (FAS)
- (El Salvador) Carlos García (El Roble)
- (El Salvador) **Víctor García** (Firpo)
- (El Salvador) Juan Gil (Talleres Jr.)
- (El Salvador) **Emilio González** (Fuerte San Francisco)
- (El Salvador) José Grande (Talleres Jr.)
- (Spain) **Diego Gregori** (Águila)
- (El Salvador) **Christopher Guardado** (Alianza)
- (El Salvador) **Robert Guerra** (Inter FA)
- (El Salvador) Diego Guevara (Talleres Jr.)
- (El Salvador) **José Guevara** (FAS)
- (El Salvador) **César Guevara** (FAS)
- (El Salvador) **José Gutiérrez** (Águila)
- (El Salvador) Christian Hidalgo (Vendaval)
- (El Salvador) **Rodrigo López** (Limeño)
- (El Salvador) Santos López (Tenancingo)
- (Uruguay) Gustavo Machado (Isidro Metapán)
- (El Salvador) **Óscar Maldonado** (Alianza)
- (El Salvador) **Daniel Márquez** (Cacahuatique)
- (El Salvador) **Bryan Martínez** (Firpo)
- (El Salvador) Carlos Martínez (El Roble)
- (El Salvador) Franklin Martínez (Platense)
- (El Salvador) Gerson Martínez (Izalco)
- (El Salvador) **Jairo Martínez** (Águila)
- (El Salvador) **Jefferson Martínez** (Limeño)
- (El Salvador) Kevin Martínez (Tenancingo)
- (El Salvador) Levi Martínez (Vendaval)
- (El Salvador) **Edson Meléndez** (FAS)
- (El Salvador) Zuriel Meléndez (Dragón)
- (El Salvador) **Roberto Melgar** (FAS)
- (El Salvador) Luis Méndez (Dragón)
- (El Salvador) **Leonardo Menjívar** (Alianza)
- (El Salvador) Uriel Miranda (Isidro Metapán)
- (Colombia) **André Morales** (Firpo)
- (Brazil) **Guastavo Moura** (Alianza)
- (El Salvador) José Olivia (Hércules)
- (El Salvador) **Misael Palacios** (Cacahuatique)
- (El Salvador) **Walter Pineda** (Águila)
- (El Salvador) **Yosimar Quiñónez** (Fuerte San Francisco)
- (El Salvador) **Marvín Ramos** (Limeño)
- (El Salvador) Andy Rodríguez (Zacatecoluca)
- (El Salvador) Orsi Rodríguez (Cruzeiro)
- (El Salvador) Kevin Román (Once Municipal)
- (El Salvador) **Luis Santana** (FAS)
- (El Salvador) **Jonathan Tapias** (Inter FA)
- (Colombia) Yerson Tobar (Dragón)
- (El Salvador) **Amadeo Turcios** (Águila)
- (Argentina) **Elías Umeres** (Cacahuatique)
- (El Salvador) Kevin Velásquez (Hércules)
- (El Salvador) Daniel Vásquez (El Roble)
- (El Salvador) Luis Vásquez (Hércules)
- (El Salvador) Carlos Velasco (Batanecos)

1 own goal

- (El Salvador) Kilmar Echeverría (Zacatecoluca, against Alianza)
- (El Salvador) **Giuviny Esquivel** (Fuerte San Francisco, against Platense)
- (El Salvador) **Emilio González** (Fuerte San Francisco, against Dragón)
- (El Salvador) Federico Marín (Batanecos against Firpo)

Source: FESFUT

== Broadcasting ==
In El Salvador, 2026 Copa Presidente matches are broadcast on Channel 4, Channel 10, Channel 19, Channel 21, and Tigo Sports. Matches are also broadcast on radio through Radio KL and Los Ex del Fútbol.
