= Gustavo Machado =

Gustavo Machado may refer to:

- Gustavo Machado (politician) (1898-1983), Venezuelan politician and journalist
- Gustavo Machado (fighter) (born 1975), Brazilian mixed martial artist
- Gustavo Machado (footballer) (born 2001), Uruguayan footballer
