= Sebastián Abreu =

Uruguayan footballer and manager (born 1976)

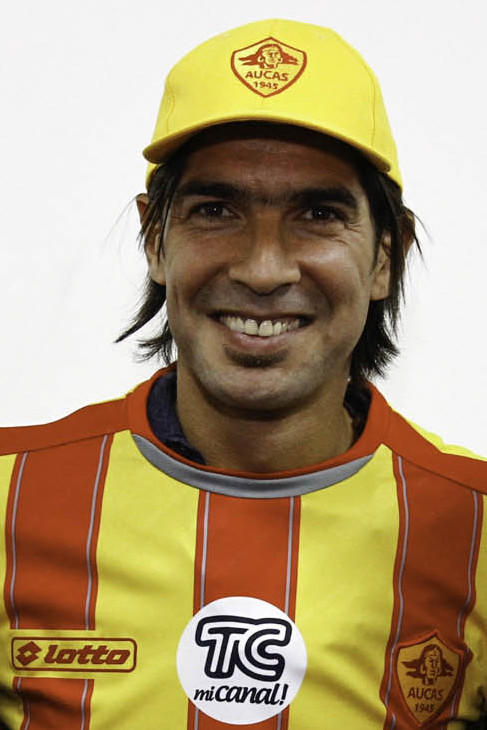
- Abreu with Aucas in 2015

Personal information
- Full name: Washington Sebastián Abreu Gallo
- Date of birth: 17 October 1976 (age 50)
- Place of birth: Minas, Uruguay
- Height: 1.93 m (6 ft 4 in)
- Position: Striker

Team information
- Current team: Tijuana (head coach)

Youth career
- 1987-1992: Nacional de Minas
- 1993–1995: Defensor

Senior career*
Years	Team	Apps	(Gls)
1995–1996	Defensor	34	(15)
1996–1998	San Lorenzo	43	(26)
1998–2004	Deportivo La Coruña	15	(3)
1998	→ Grêmio (loan)	7	(1)
1999–2000	→ Tecos (loan)	33	(27)
2000–2001	→ San Lorenzo (loan)	25	(10)
2001	→ Nacional (loan)	18	(16)
2002–2003	→ Cruz Azul (loan)	39	(34)
2003	→ América (loan)	16	(3)
2004	→ Tecos (loan)	17	(5)
2004–2005	Nacional	31	(16)
2005–2006	Dorados de Sinaloa	34	(22)
2006	Monterrey	16	(7)
2007	San Luis	14	(6)
2007–2008	Tigres UANL	15	(7)
2008	→ River Plate (loan)	17	(2)
2008	Beitar Jerusalem	0	(0)
2008–2009	River Plate	0	(0)
2009	→ Real Sociedad (loan)	18	(11)
2009–2010	Aris	8	(3)
2010–2012	Botafogo	93	(55)
2012	→ Figueirense (loan)	5	(0)
2013–2015	Nacional	18	(5)
2013–2014	→ Rosario Central (loan)	38	(8)
2015	→ Aucas (loan)	10	(4)
2016	Sol de América	10	(2)
2016	Santa Tecla	21	(13)
2017	Bangu	10	(3)
2017	Central Español	8	(6)
2017	Puerto Montt	13	(11)
2018	Audax Italiano	10	(0)
2018	Magallanes	9	(3)
2019	Rio Branco	8	(6)
2019–2020	Boston River	33	(4)
2021	Athletic-MG	4	(0)
2021	Sud América	4	(0)
2021	Olimpia de Minas	6	(4)
Total		700	(338)

International career
1996–2012	Uruguay	70	(26)

Managerial career
- 2019: Santa Tecla (caretaker)
- 2020: Boston River
- 2022: Always Ready
- 2022: Paysandú
- 2023: Universidad César Vallejo
- 2024–2025: Dorados
- 2025–: Tijuana
Medal record
Representing Uruguay
Copa América
Winner	2011 Argentina
- * Club domestic league appearances and goals

Washington Sebastián Abreu Gallo (Spanish pronunciation: [seβasˈtjan aˈβɾew]; is a Uruguayan professional football manager and former player who is currently the head coach of Liga MX club Tijuana. Nicknamed "El Loco" (lit. 'the Madman'), over a 26-year playing career he carved out a place in football history as one of the game's most well-travelled figures, representing 32 clubs across 11 countries.

A former striker, across 700 league appearances Abreu scored 338 goals, collecting honours with San Lorenzo and River Plate in Argentina, Nacional in Uruguay, Botafogo in Brazil and Santa Tecla in El Salvador. His prolific scoring also saw him finish as the top scorer in Mexico's top division on four separate occasions. Abreu, along with Zlatan Ibrahimovic, Roque Santa Cruz, Joaquín Sánchez and José Sand, are the only professional players who have scored in 4 decades (1990, 2000, 2010 and 2020).

At international level, Abreu earned 70 caps for Uruguay, scoring 26 goals. He represented his country at two FIFA World Cups, in 2002 and 2010, and featured in three Copa América tournaments in 1997, 2007 and 2011. The crowning achievement came in 2011, when he helped Uruguay lift the continental title.

== Club career ==
=== Early years ===
Born in Minas, Lavalleja Department, Abreu joined the youth section of Nacional de Minas in 1987 and he debuted for the first team in 1992 against Olimpia de Minas, the club he always supported. In 1993, he was signed by Defensor Sporting and played for their youtg department until 1995, when he broke out to the first team.

=== San Lorenzo and Deportivo La Coruña ===
In 1996, he was signed by San Llorento in the league of Argentina, where he impressed. In 1998, he had an unsuccessful stint with Spain's Deportivo de La Coruña, which loaned him several times for the duration of his contract. During his sole season in La Liga, which started in January 1998, having been signed from San Lorenzo, Abreu scored for the Galicians in a 3–1 home defeat of Barcelona on 25 January.

Later, he played in numerous clubs throughout America (Uruguay, Argentina, Mexico and Brazil).

=== River Plate and Beitar Jerusalem ===
After having joined Mexico's Tigres UANL in 2007, Abreu was able to rescind his contract with them in order to join River Plate – the Mexican Football Federation stalled on recognising the transfer because of an imposed moratorium between the clubs. He became the only foreigner to score in the Clásico Regiomontano (Tigres vs. Monterrey, which he represented the previous year) against each team.

In the middle of 2008, after exhausting negotiations, Abreu signed a deal with Israeli League champions Beitar Jerusalem. He appeared in the qualifying rounds of the UEFA Champions League, but his team was quickly eliminated. Additionally, he could not play in the domestic front due to lack of payment.

Abreu re-signed with River Plate in September 2008 after terminating his link with Beitar, with a deal lasting until June 2009. Due to being a late addition, he was not able to play for the side in the Primera División, only featuring in the Copa Sudamericana. The next year, he was eligible for both the domestic and Copa Libertadores fronts.

=== Real Sociedad ===
In early January 2009, Abreu returned to Spain after a ten-year absence, being loaned by River to Segunda División side Real Sociedad, which had lost habitual first choice Iñigo Díaz de Cerio for the season due to a serious leg injury.

On 14 March 2009, he scored a hat-trick in a 3–1 away win against league leaders Xerez. His team, however, ultimately failed in returning to the top flight.

=== Botafogo ===
On 13 June 2009, Aris in Greece signed Abreu from River Plate. However, in January of the following year, the 33-year-old changed club and country again, agreeing on a two-year contract with Brazil's Botafogo.

Abreu scored the second goal in the 2–1 victory over Flamengo on 18 April 2010, which gave the team the Campeonato Carioca title. In July, he had his link extended until 31 December 2012 with a release clause of US$11.3 million, with the player declaring he had previously held talks with Universidad de Chile and Trabzonspor of Turkey.

On 6 February 2011, Abreu was involved in a dramatic match against Fluminense: his team won a penalty kick as they were losing 2–1, and he shot it in Panenka-style, with Diego Cavalieri saving the shot by simply standing still. Another penalty was awarded just five minutes later, and he shot it in the same fashion, this time into the right-hand corner of the goal, as the goalkeeper dived the other way; a few minutes later, Botafogo scored again and won the game.

Abreu was loaned to fellow Série A side Figueirense on 5 July 2012. However, as the season went on to end in relegation, his contract was ended via Twitter on 24 November, one day before the last game against Grêmio.

=== Sol de América ===
From January 2013 to December 2015, Abreu was under contract to Nacional, also being loaned to Rosario Central and Aucas during this timeframe. On 28 December 2015, Paraguayan newspaper D10 reported that he had met in Uruguay with Sol de América chairman Miguel Figueredo. He had already received a more lucrative offer from Mexico, but declined in order to be closer to his country, and was officially confirmed on 6 January 2016.

=== Bangu ===
On 12 November 2016, 40-year-old Abreu joined Brazil's Bangu from Santa Tecla, with the deal effective from the following January. After ten appearances in the Rio de Janeiro State League, he left.

=== Later years ===
On 4 April 2017, Abreu signed with Montevideo-based team Central Español of the Uruguayan Segunda División. In late December of the same year, he joined Chilean Primera División's Audax Italiano from Puerto Montt, in the same country but one level below; this transfer broke a world record, as it marked him as the first player to have played for 26 professional clubs.

Abreu returned to Brazil in December 2018 at age 42, agreeing to a contract at Série D's Rio Branco. He returned to his homeland the following July, signing with Boston River and making his Primera División debut in a 0–0 draw against River Plate where he donned jersey number 113.

On 8 February 2021, Abreu signed for Athletic Club in Brazil. After four matches in the Campeonato Mineiro, he terminated his contract on 21 March due to the COVID-19 pandemic.

=== Final return to Uruguay ===
On 30 March 2021, Abreu joined newly promoted Uruguayan top-tier club Sud América. On 10 June, he announced his decision to retire from professional football, and it was reported on news the game against Liverpool the following day would be his last.

Abreu's hometown side Olimpia de Minas announced on 29 August 2021 that he would briefly come out of retirement to play for them in the local Campeonato Minuano. His debut with Olimpia was a dream come true and he helped his team earn a point in the league with a 93d minute penalty equaliser wearing the captain's armband. He concluded the, season as champion of the local Minas championship with his beloved, Olimpia de Minas.

He also finished as champion of the +40 category tournament of ADIC (Asociación Deportiva de Integración Colegial), and also top scorer with 17 goals in 11 matches for the amateur (college) team Colegio Jesús María 2019, being the second championship won in the year after the Apertura, where he also ranked first in the scoring charts.

== International career ==
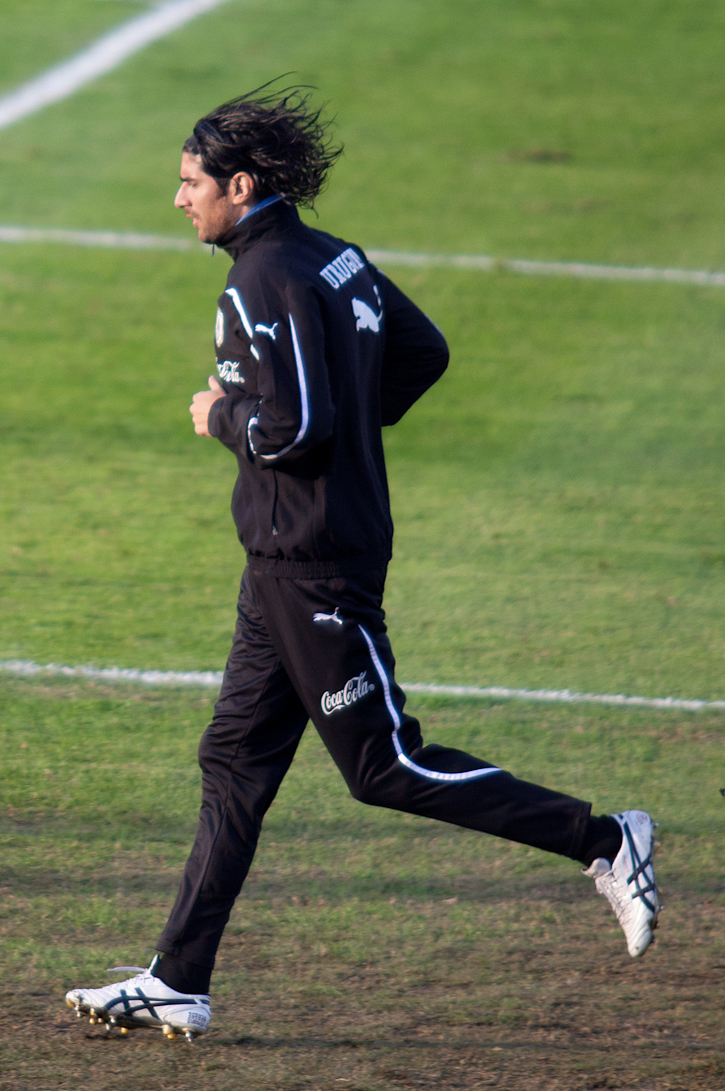
Abreu training with Uruguay in 2011

Abreu played for Uruguay at the 2002 FIFA World Cup – three matches – and the 1997, 2007 and 2011 Copa América editions, netting twice in the latter. He made his debut for the national side on 17 July 1996 in a friendly with China, going on to earn 70 caps.

On 27 May 2010, Abreu stood only five goals short of Uruguayan all-time goalscoring record, held by Héctor Scarone for 79 years. He was selected for the 2010 World Cup in South Africa, where he appeared three times as a substitute; in the quarter-finals against Ghana he scored the decisive penalty shootout attempt (1–1 after 120 minutes), a Panenka to send his team to the semi-finals for the first time in 40 years.

== Coaching career ==
On 26 April 2019, Abreu was announced as the interim manager of Santa Tecla on an initial one-and-a-half month spell, with the parties holding the option open of keeping him as a player-coach or just as a player afterwards. He won the Copa El Salvador four days later, defeating Audaz 1–0 in the final.

In December 2019, Abreu was appointed player-coach at Boston River ahead of the upcoming campaign in the Uruguayan Primera División. He resigned from the last-placed club the following 9 November.

Abreu was named manager of Bolivian Primera División side Always Ready on 30 January 2022. On 1 March, he left by mutual consent.

On 25 May 2022, Abreu was appointed at Paysandú in the Uruguayan Primera División Amateur.

On 30 May 2024, Abreu became the head coach of Dorados.

On 30 April 2025, Liga MX club Tijuana announced Abreu as their new head coach.

== Managerial statistics ==
As of 20 November 2026

Managerial record by team and tenure
Team	Nat	From	To	Record							
Team	Nat	From	To	G	W	D	L	GF	GA	GD	Win %
Santa Tecla FC	(El Salvador)	26 April 2019	31 May 2019	4	1	1	2	3	4	−1	25.00
Boston River	(Uruguay)	1 January 2020	9 November 2020	18	3	7	8	19	27	−8	16.67
Club Always Ready	(Bolivia)	30 January 2022	1 March 2022	4	1	1	2	4	7	−3	25.00
César Vallejo	(Peru)	17 November 2022	30 August 2023	36	12	9	15	47	55	−8	33.33
Dorados de Sinaloa	(Mexico)	30 May 2024	12 March 2025	24	7	4	13	34	45	−11	29.17
Club Tijuana	(Mexico)	30 April 2025	Present	59	20	20	19	86	82	+4	33.90
Career total				145	44	42	59	193	220	−27	30.34

== Personal life ==
Abreu's son, Diego, played for Mexico at under-16 level.

From October 2019 to August 2020 he hosted Trato Hecho, the Uruguayan version of Deal or No Deal, being replaced by Maximiliano de la Cruz.

== Career statistics ==
=== International ===
Appearances and goals by national team and year
National team	Year	Apps	Goals
Uruguay	1996	2	1
Uruguay	1997	5	2
Uruguay	1998	0	0
Uruguay	1999	0	0
Uruguay	2000	2	0
Uruguay	2001	0	0
Uruguay	2002	7	6
Uruguay	2003	2	1
Uruguay	2004	0	0
Uruguay	2005	1	1
Uruguay	2006	7	2
Uruguay	2007	10	7
Uruguay	2008	8	3
Uruguay	2009	10	1
Uruguay	2010	8	2
Uruguay	2011	5	0
Uruguay	2012	3	0
Total		70	26

Scores and results list Uruguay's goal tally first, score column indicates score after each Abreu’s goal.

List of international goals scored by Sebastian Abreu
No.	Date	Venue	Opponent	Score	Result	Competition	Ref.
1	25 August 1996	Nagai Stadium, Osaka, Japan	Japan	2–4	3–5	Friendly	
2	16 November 1997	Estadio Domingo Burgueño, Maldonado, Uruguay	Ecuador	3–1	5–3	1998 FIFA World Cup qualification	
3	16 November 1997	Estadio Domingo Burgueño, Maldonado, Uruguay	Ecuador	4–1	5–3	1998 FIFA World Cup qualification	
4	13 February 2002	Estadio Centenario, Montevideo, Uruguay	South Korea	1–0	2–1	Friendly	
5	13 February 2002	Estadio Centenario, Montevideo, Uruguay	South Korea	2–1	2–1	Friendly	
6	17 April 2002	San Siro, Milan, Italy	Italy	1–1	1–1	Friendly	
7	12 May 2002	Robert F. Kennedy Memorial Stadium, Washington D.C., United States	United States	1–2	1–2	Friendly	
8	16 May 2002	Wulihe Stadium, Shenyang, China	China	1–0	2–0	Friendly	
9	16 May 2002	Wulihe Stadium, Shenyang, China	China	2–0	2–0	Friendly	
10	8 June 2003	Seoul World Cup Stadium, Seoul, South Korea	South Korea	2–0	2–0	Friendly	
11	20 August 2003	Stadio Artemio Franchi, Florence, Italy	Argentina	2–1	2–3	Friendly	
12	26 October 2005	Estadio Jalisco, Guadalajara, Mexico	Mexico	1–1	1–3	Friendly	
13	30 May 2006	7 November Stadium, Radès, Tunisia	Libya	2–0	2–1	Friendly	
14	18 October 2006	Estadio Centenario, Montevideo, Uruguay	Venezuela	3–0	4–0	Friendly	
15	7 February 2007	Estadio General Santander, Cúcuta, Colombia	Colombia	1–0	3–1	Friendly	
16	7 February 2007	Estadio General Santander, Cúcuta, Colombia	Colombia	2–0	3–1	Friendly	
17	10 July 2007	Estadio José Pachencho Romero, Maracaibo, Venezuela	Brazil	2–2	2–2	2007 Copa América	
18	14 July 2007	Olympic Stadium, Caracas, Venezuela	Mexico	1–0	1–3	2007 Copa América	
19	13 October 2007	Estadio Centenario, Montevideo, Uruguay	Bolivia	3–0	5–0	2010 FIFA World Cup qualification	
20	18 November 2007	Estadio Centenario, Montevideo, Uruguay	Chile	2–2	2–2	2010 FIFA World Cup qualification	
21	22 November 2007	Estádio do Morumbi, São Paulo, Brazil	Brazil	1–0	1–2	2010 FIFA World Cup qualification	
22	17 June 2008	Estadio Centenario, Montevideo, Uruguay	Peru	6–0	6–0	2010 FIFA World Cup qualification	
23	20 August 2008	Sapporo Dome, Sapporo, Japan	Japan	3–1	3–1	Friendly	
24	14 October 2008	Estadio Hernando Siles, La Paz, Bolivia	Bolivia	2–2	2–2	2010 FIFA World Cup qualification	
25	18 November 2009	Estadio Centenario, Montevideo, Uruguay	Costa Rica	1–0	1–1	2010 FIFA World Cup qualification	
26	26 May 2010	Estadio Centenario, Montevideo, Uruguay	Israel	3–1	4–1	Friendly	
27	26 May 2010	Estadio Centenario, Montevideo, Uruguay	Israel	4–1	4–1	Friendly	

== Honours ==
=== Player ===
San Lorenzo

- Argentine Primera División: 2001 Clausura

Nacional

- Uruguayan Primera División: 2001, 2003 Apertura, 2004 Apertura, 2005

River Plate

- Argentine Primera División: 2008 Clausura

Botafogo

- Campeonato Carioca: 2010
- Taça Guanabara: 2010
- Taça Rio: 2010, 2012

Santa Tecla

- Salvadoran Primera División: 2016 Apertura

Uruguay

- Copa América: 2011

Individual

- Mexican Primera División Golden Boot: Verano 2000, Verano 2002, Apertura 2005, Clausura 2006

=== Manager ===
Santa Tecla

- Copa El Salvador: 2018–19
