= Inter Santa Tecla =

Association football club in El Salvador

- Full name: Internacional Santa Tecla
- Nickname: El Equipo del Futuro (The Team of the Future)
- Founded: 12 June 2025; 17 months ago as Internacional Formando Atletas Inter FA
- Ground: Estadio Las Delicias
- Capacity: 10,000
- Owners: José and Ricardo Ortiz
- Manager: José Giacone (footballer, born 1974)
- League: Primera División de Fútbol Profesional
- 2026 Clausura: Overall: 4th Playoffs: Qualified
Home colours	Away colours	Third colours

Internacional Santa Tecla is a Salvadoran professional football club based in Santa Tecla, El Salvador.

The club will debut in the Primera División de Fútbol de El Salvador series since the Apertura 2025 tournament.

== History ==
Inter Formando Atletas (Inter FA for short) announced they would be taking Dragon spot in the Primera division.

On May 27th, 2026, it was announced by the club that they will be rebranded as Internacional Santa Tecla, they will change their colour to be green and black, which will be more inline with historic club Santa Tecla FC.

== Honours ==
=== Domestic honours ===
==== Leagues ====
- Segunda División de El Salvador and predecessors
  - Champions (2) : N/A
  - Runners-up (0): N/A
- Tercera Division de Fútbol Salvadoreño and predecessors
  - Champions (1) : N/A
  - Play-off winner (2): N/A
- La Asociación Departamental de Fútbol Aficionado' and predecessors (4th tier)
  - Champions (1):
  - Play-off winner (0): N/A

== Sponsorship ==
Companies that Inter FA currently has sponsorship deals with for 2025–2026 includes:

- (El Salvador) Maca – Official kit suppliers
- (El Salvador) Bet Pro – Official sponsors
- (Costa Rica) Unique Capital – Official sponsors
- (Costa Rica) MH Sport – Official sponsors
- (El Salvador) Make – Official sponsors
- (Mexico) Electrolit – Official sponsors
- (El Salvador) TBD – Official sponsors
- (El Salvador) TBD – Official sponsors

== Stadium ==
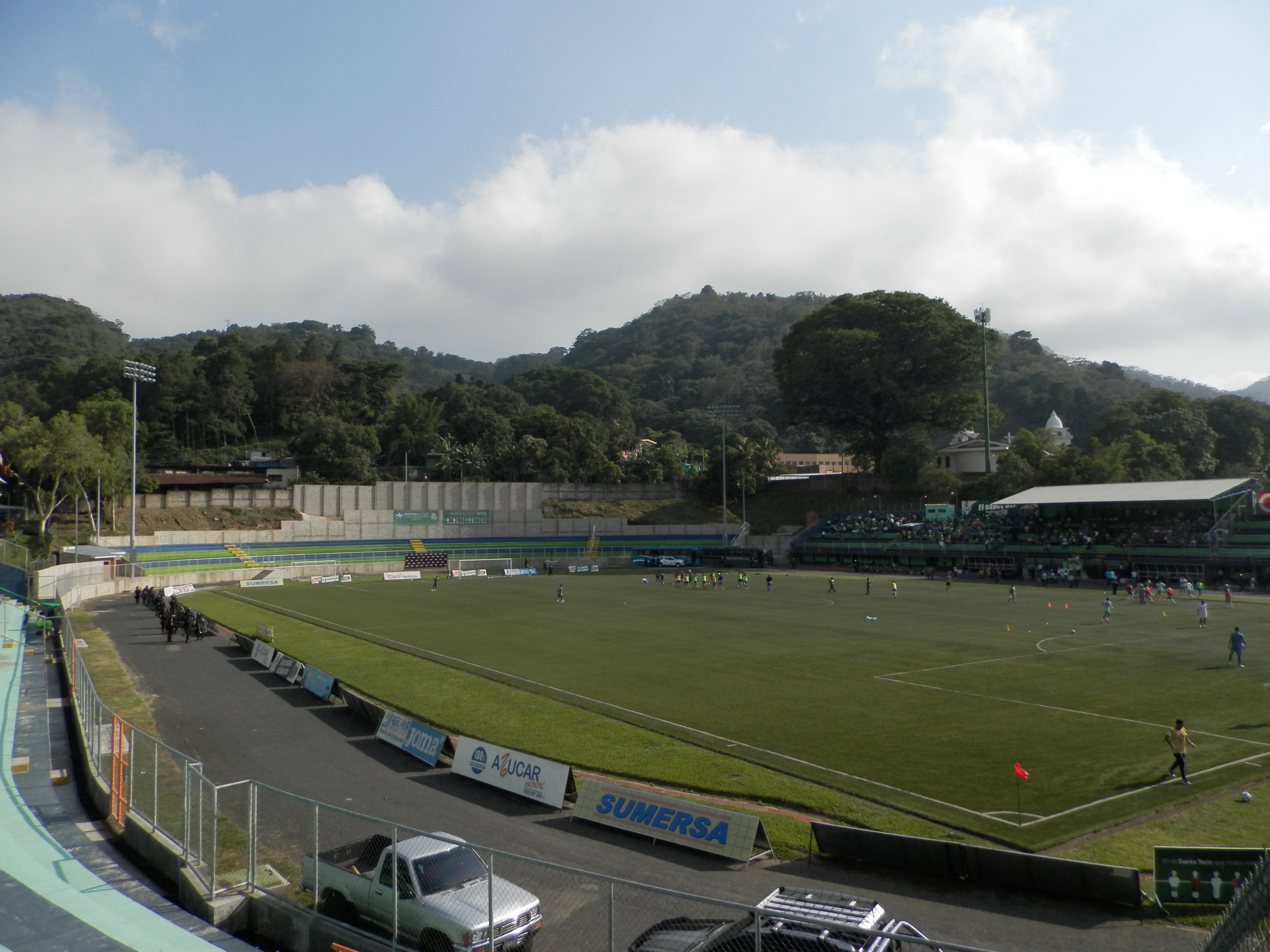

Estadio Las Delicias (2025–present) Inter FA has forged its entire history, from 2025 to the present, in the Estadio Las Delicias,

== Current squad ==
As of July, 2026 Note: Flags indicate national team as defined under FIFA eligibility rules; some limited exceptions apply. Players may hold more than one non-FIFA nationality.

No.	Pos.	Nation	Player
1	GK	ESA	Sergio Sibrian
2	FW	CUB	Marcel Hernández
3	DF	ESA	Roberto Domínguez
4	DF	ESA	Kevin Molina
5	DF	ESA	Alejandro Serrano
6	MF	ESA	Christopher Guardado
7	MF	ESA	Jairo Henriquez
8	DF	ESA	Allexon Saravia
9	FW	PAN	Freddy Gondola
10	MF	CRC	Yoserth Hernandez
11	FW	ESA	Hamilton Benitez
12	DF	ESA	Ruben Marroquin (vice-captain)
13	MF	ESA	Andrés Hernández
14	FW	ESA	Luis Vasquez
15	DF	PAN	Gabriel Brown
16	FW	ESA	Isaac Esquivel

No.	Pos.	Nation	Player
17	DF	ESA	Adan Climaco
18	DF	ESA	Erick Monge
19	MF	ESA	Diego Coca
20	MF	ESA	Isaac Portillo
21	MF	ESA	Dennis Garica
22	FW	ARG	Guillermo Stradella
23	FW	ESA	Josue Rivera
24	GK	ESA	Adriel Martinez
25	GK	ESA	Gerson Lopez
26	MF	ESA	Darwin Ceren (captain)
27	DF	COL	Julian Grueso
30	FW	ESA	Emerson Mauricio
46	FW	ESA	Brandon Ramirez
58	MF	ESA	Michael Umana

=== Players with dual citizenship ===
- (Argentina) (El Salvador) Guillermo Stradella
- (El Salvador) (Spain) Adriel Martínez
- (El Salvador) (United States) Allexon Saravia
- (El Salvador) (United States) Erick Monge
- (El Salvador) (Costa Rica) Adan Climaco
- (El Salvador) (United States) Michael Umana

=== In ===
Note: Flags indicate national team as defined under FIFA eligibility rules; some limited exceptions apply. Players may hold more than one non-FIFA nationality.

No.	Pos.	Nation	Player
—		ESA	Roberto Domínguez (From Isidro Metapan)
—		PAN	Freddy Góndola (From Plaza Amador)
—		ESA	Gerson Lopez (From Hércules)
—		CRC	Yoserth Hernández (From Municipal Liberia)
—		ESA	Adán Clímaco (From Municipal Pérez Zeledón)

No.	Pos.	Nation	Player
—		ESA	Luis Vasquez (From Hércules)
—		ESA	Christopher Guardado (From Alianza)
—		ESA	Dennis Garcia (From Hércules)
—		ESA	Isaac Esquivel (From Hércules)
—		CUB	Marcel Hernández (From Herediano)

=== Out ===
Note: Flags indicate national team as defined under FIFA eligibility rules; some limited exceptions apply. Players may hold more than one non-FIFA nationality.

No.	Pos.	Nation	Player
—		PER	Diego Espinoza (To TBD)
—		ESA	Alexis Renderos (To Fuerte San Francisco)
—		ESA	Rudy Batres (To TBD)
—		ESA	Héctor Carvajal (To Fuerte San Francisco)
—		COL	Jonathan Tapias (To TBD)

No.	Pos.	Nation	Player
—		ESA	Gabriel Velasquez (To TBD)
—		ESA	Ronald Aparicio (To Fuerte San Francisco)
—		ESA	Francisco Escobar (To Fuerte San Francisco)
—		ESA	Edwin Córdova (To Fuerte San Francisco)
—		ESA	Eduardo Rivas (To Alianza FC)

== Coaching staff ==
As of October, 2026

Position	Staff
Manager	(Argentina) José Giacone
Assistant Manager	(Argentina) Diego Giacone
Reserve Manager	(El Salvador) Francisco Medrano
Ladies's Manager	(El Salvador) Dalila Cazun
Physical coach	(El Salvador) Carlos Cortéz
Assistant Physical coach	(El Salvador) TBD
Goalkeeper Coach	(Mexico) Jesús Dautt
Kineslogic	(El Salvador) TBD
Utility Equipment	(El Salvador) TBD
Football director	(Uruguay) Luis Fernando Espindola
Team Doctor	(El Salvador) TBD

== List of coaches ==
As of October 14, 2026

The club's current manager is Costa Rican Luis Marin. William Renderos was named the first manager of the club in 2025.

Name	Nat	Tenure	Win-Draw-Loss
William Renderos	(El Salvador)	June 2025–September 2025	0–4–4
Horacio Lugo (Interim)	(Argentina)	September 2025–September 2025	1-0-1
Harold Wallace (1 Game)	(Costa Rica)	October 2025–October 2026	0-0-1
Luis Marin (September 2025–October 2026)	(Costa Rica)	September 2025 - October 2026	21–21–14
TBD	(Argentina)	October 2026 - Present	0–0–0

== Non-playing staff ==
=== Management ===
As of October, 2026

Position	Name
Owner	(Costa Rica) José and Ricardo Ortiz
President	(Costa Rica) José Ortiz
Vice-president	(El Salvador) Ricardo Ortiz
General Director	(Uruguay) Luis Fernando Espindola
Administrative Director	(El Salvador) Rene Guillen
Deputy managing director	(El Salvador) TBD
Treasurer	(El Salvador) TBD
Executive Director	(El Salvador) TBD
Sporting director	(Uruguay) Luis Fernando Espindola

=== List of President ===
- (El Salvador) Martín Herrera (June 2025 - November 2025)
- (Costa Rica) José Ortiz (November 2025 - Present)

== Other departments ==
=== Football ===
==== Reserve team ====
The reserve team serves mainly as the final stepping stone for promising young players under the age of 21 before being promoted to the main team. The second team is coached by TBD. the team played in the Primera División Reserves, their greatest successes were finishing runner up in the Reserve championships in the Clausura 2024. It plays its home matches at TBD, adjacent to the first teams and women's team.

Name	Nat	Tenure	Notes
Cristian López	(El Salvador)	June 2025 - December 2025	N/A
Francisco Medrano	(El Salvador)	January 2026 - Present	N/A

=== Current squad ===
As of: July, 2025 Note: Flags indicate national team as defined under FIFA eligibility rules; some limited exceptions apply. Players may hold more than one non-FIFA nationality.

No.	Pos.	Nation	Player
—		ESA	Miguel Monge
—		ESA	Bryan Delgado
—		ESA	Andre Recinos
—		ESA	Estefano Argueta
—		ESA	Matias López
—		ESA	Diego Luna
—		ESA	Inner Guevara
—		ESA	Jostin Romero
—		ESA	Rodolfo Amaya
—		ESA	Wilber Menjívar
—		ESA	Stanley Zamora
—		ESA	Diego Reyes
—		ESA	Enzo Salazar

No.	Pos.	Nation	Player
—		ESA	Anthony Velásquez
—		ESA	Adrián Murgas
—		ESA	Bryan Torres
—		ESA	Ronald Vargas
—		ESA	Robert Guerra
—		ESA	Marcelo Fonseco
—		ESA	Gerardo Pineda
—		ESA	Joseph Alvarenga

==== Junior teams ====
The youth team (under 17 and under 15) has produced some of El Salvador's top football players, including TBD and TBD. It plays its home matches at TBD, adjacent to the first team's ground, and it is coached by William Osorio (under 17) and Chepe Martínez (Under 15). The team greatest successes was reaching the final of the Apertura 2025 season.

Name	Nat	Tenure
William Osorio	(El Salvador)	June 2025 - Present

=== Current squad ===
As of: June, 2025 Note: Flags indicate national team as defined under FIFA eligibility rules; some limited exceptions apply. Players may hold more than one non-FIFA nationality.

No.	Pos.	Nation	Player
GK		ESA	David Fauxillon
—		ESA	Edier Palacio
—		ESA	Eduardo Choto
—		ESA	Diego Sánchez
—		ESA	Ariel Iraheta
—		ESA	Emanuel Bermúdez
—		ESA	Kevin Hernández
—		ESA	Gerald Anaya
—		ESA	Arturo Quintanilla
—		ESA	Anderson Crespín

No.	Pos.	Nation	Player
—		ESA	Sebastian Gonzáles
—		ESA	William Álvarez
—		ESA	Javier Castaneda
—		ESA	David Portillo
—		ESA	Juan Quintanilla
—		ESA	Jefferson Martínez
—		ESA	Henry Patriz
—		ESA	Edwin Coreas
—		ESA	Mateo Reyes
—		ESA	Eduardo Ortiz
—		ESA	Owen Pacheco

=== World Cup players ===
Players that have played for Inter FA in their career and played in a U-17 World Cup:

- (El Salvador) Anderson Tula (2025)

==== Women's team ====
The women's first team, which is led by head coach Dalila Cazún, features several members of the El Salvador national ladies team. Their greatest successes were reaching the semi finals of Apertura 2023, where they lost 10–1 on aggregate to Alianza Women's.

Name	Nat	Tenure
Dalila Cazún	(El Salvador)	June 2025 - April 2026
Cristian Peña	(El Salvador)	April 2026 - May 2026
Sugey Matarrita	(Costa Rica)	June 2026 - Present

=== Current squad ===
As of: June, 2025 Note: Flags indicate national team as defined under FIFA eligibility rules; some limited exceptions apply. Players may hold more than one non-FIFA nationality.

No.	Pos.	Nation	Player
—	GK	ESA	María Katalina
—		ESA	Marlyn Sarabia
—	MF	ESA	Kimberly Reyes
—	MF	ESA	Camila Barahona
—	GK	ESA	Ingrid Gutiérrez
—	MF	ESA	Karla Flores
—		ESA	Valentina Alvarenga
—		ESA	Nicolle Amaya
—		ESA	Bitia Ramírez

No.	Pos.	Nation	Player
—	GK	ESA	Jennifer Alvarado
—	MF	ESA	Leslie Cabezas
—		ESA	Andrea Recinos
—		ESA	Adriana Herrera
—		ESA	Liliana Somoza
—		ESA	Norma Mendoza
—		COL	Eudis Garrido

As of April 21, 2026

Position	Staff
Manager	(Costa Rica) Sugey Matarrita
Assistant Manager	(Costa Rica) Indira González
Physical coach	(Costa Rica) Alejandro Gonzalez
Goalkeeper Coach	(El Salvador) Marlon Lopez
Physiotherapist	(El Salvador) Judít Noemi
Kineslogic	(El Salvador) TBD
Utility Equipment	(El Salvador) TBD
Football director	(El Salvador) Mónica Tevez
Team Doctor	(El Salvador) TBD

=== In ===
Note: Flags indicate national team as defined under FIFA eligibility rules; some limited exceptions apply. Players may hold more than one non-FIFA nationality.

No.	Pos.	Nation	Player
—		ESA	Priscila Ortiz (From TBD)
—		COL	Aslyn Caraball (From TBD)
—	GK	ESA	Giselle Castillo (From TBD)
—		ARG	Candela Gerez (From TBD)

No.	Pos.	Nation	Player
—		CRC	Diana Vallejos (From TBD)
—		CRC	Hilary Corrales (From TBD)
—		ESA	TBD (From TBD)

=== Out ===
Note: Flags indicate national team as defined under FIFA eligibility rules; some limited exceptions apply. Players may hold more than one non-FIFA nationality.

No.	Pos.	Nation	Player
—		ESA	Daniela Maldonado (To TBD)
—		ESA	Antonella Gavigioli (To TBD)
—		ESA	Icela Rivas (To TBD)
—		ESA	Fatima Posada (To TBD)

No.	Pos.	Nation	Player
—		ESA	TBD (To TBD)
—		ESA	TBD (To TBD)
—		ESA	TBD (To TBD)

== Affiliated clubs ==
The following clubs are currently affiliated with Inter FA:

- (Colombia) Fortaleza C.E.I.F. (2005–present)
