= Rodrigo Rivera (footballer, born 1993) =

Salvadoran footballer

Personal information
- Full name: Rodrigo José Rivera Sánchez
- Date of birth: 16 August 1993 (age 33)
- Place of birth: Ciudad Arce, El Salvador
- Height: 1.74 m (5 ft 9 in)
- Position: Midfielder

Team information
- Current team: FAS
- Number: 29

Senior career*
Years	Team	Apps	(Gls)
2011–2015	Juventud Independiente	71	(6)
2015–2018	Alianza F.C.	105	(6)
2018–	Santa Tecla	93	(6)

International career^{‡}
2016–	El Salvador	4	(0)
- * Club domestic league appearances and goals as of 21:27, 12 July 2021 ‡ National team caps and goals as of 21:27, 12 July 2021

Rodrigo José Rivera Sánchez (born 16 August 1993) is a Salvadoran professional footballer who plays as a midfielder for Primera División club FAS.

== Club career ==
Rivera began his career with Juventud Independiente, before moving to Alianza F.C. in 2015. After winning three Primera División de Fútbol de El Salvador, he moved to Santa Tecla where he helped them win their own Primera División title.

== International career ==
Rivera made his debut with the El Salvador national team in a 1–1 friendly tie with Nicaragua on 9 March 2016.

== Career statistics ==
=== Club ===
As of 18 May 2025

Club	Division	League			Cup		Continental		Total	
Club	Division	Season	Apps	Goals	Apps	Goals	Apps	Goals	Apps	Goals
Juventud Independiente	Salvadorian Primera División	2011-12	11	0	—		—		11	0
Juventud Independiente	Salvadorian Primera División	2012-13	15	1	—		—		15	1
Juventud Independiente	Salvadorian Primera División	2013-14	17	0	—		—		17	0
Juventud Independiente	Salvadorian Primera División	2014-15	28	5	—		—		28	5
Juventud Independiente	Total		71	6	0	0	0	0	71	6
Alianza F.C.	Salvadorian Primera División	2015-16	44	5	—		—		44	5
Alianza F.C.	Salvadorian Primera División	2016-17	44	1	—		3	0	47	1
Alianza F.C.	Salvadorian Primera División	2017-18	17	0	—		—		17	0
Alianza F.C.	Total		105	6	0	0	3	0	108	6
Santa Tecla	Salvadorian Primera División	2018-19	39	2	—		2	0	41	2
Santa Tecla	Salvadorian Primera División	2019-20	20	2	—		4	0	24	2
Santa Tecla	Salvadorian Primera División	2020-21	34	2	—		—		34	2
Santa Tecla	Salvadorian Primera División	2021-22	6	0	—		—		6	0
Santa Tecla	Total		99	6	0	0	6	0	105	6
FAS	Salvadorian Primera División	2021-22	19	0	—		—		19	0
FAS	Salvadorian Primera División	2022-23	33	0	—		—		33	0
FAS	Salvadorian Primera División	2023-24	39	1	—		4	0	43	1
FAS	Salvadorian Primera División	2024-25	30	1	—		—		30	1
FAS	Total		121	2	0	0	4	0	125	2
Career total			396	20	0	0	13	0	409	20

== Honours ==
Alianza

- Primera División de Fútbol de El Salvador: 2015–16 Apertura, 2017–18 Apertura, 2017–18 Clausura

Santa Tecla

- Primera División de Fútbol de El Salvador: 2018–19 Apertura
- Copa El Salvador: 2018–19
