= Diego Abreu =

Uruguayan footballer (born 2003)

Personal information
- Full name: Diego Fernando Abreu Firenze
- Date of birth: 27 August 2003 (age 23)
- Place of birth: Mexico City, Mexico
- Height: 1.87 m (6 ft 2 in)
- Position: Forward

Team information
- Current team: Tijuana
- Number: 19

Youth career
- Rincón del Carrasco
- Carrasco Polo
- Defensor Sporting
- 2023: → Botafogo (youth loan)

Senior career*
Years	Team	Apps	(Gls)
2024–2026	Defensor Sporting	29	(7)
2024	→ Toluca (loan)	0	(0)
2026–	Tijuana	24	(3)

International career^{‡}
2019	Mexico U17	3	(4)
2020	Mexico U18	1	(0)
2021	Mexico U20	2	(1)
2021–	Uruguay U20	3	(2)
- * Club domestic league appearances and goals as of 22 November 2026 ‡ National team caps and goals as of 22 November 2026

Diego Fernando Abreu Firenze (born 27 August 2003) is a professional footballer who plays as a forward for Liga MX club Tijuana. Born in Mexico, he is currently a youth international for Uruguay.

== Early life ==
Abreu was born in Mexico City, Mexico, to former Uruguayan international footballer Sebastián Abreu and Paola Firenze. He has one older sister, Valentina, and two younger brothers, Facundo and Franco. As a child, he lived in Mexico, Argentina, Spain, Greece, Uruguay, and Brazil, following his father's footballing career as he moved to different clubs. Following his father's move to Nacional, Diego's family decided he would stay in Uruguay from 2014 onwards, though he visited his father occasionally as he continued his career abroad. Abreu holds a Mexican passport via jus soli, along with a Uruguayan passport and an Italian passport, as his mother is of Italian descent.

== Club career ==
=== Early career ===
Abreu first started playing football at the request of his father, though he stated in an interview with ESPN Deportes that he "only went [in order] to drink Gatorade at halftime". While living in Rio de Janeiro, Brazil, he played futsal, before returning to Uruguay to play organized football at the youth level. He initially played for Rincón del Carrasco in the Canelones Department of Uruguay, but after not being selected to play very often, he moved to Carrasco Polo in Montevideo.

=== Defensor Sporting ===
He joined Defensor Sporting in his last year of baby fútbol and recalled in another interview with ESPN Deportes that his first major involvement with the club was in a youth tournament in Brazil, where he missed a penalty against Internacional; chipping a Panenka shot that did not even reach the goal. He continued to progress through the academy and made his unofficial debut in a 2–1 friendly loss against Argentinian opposition Vélez Sarsfield on 14 January 2023. A few days later, on 17 January, he scored his first goal for the club, the consolation in another 2–1 loss, this time to Montevideo Wanderers of Uruguay.

==== Loan to Botafogo ====
On 31 March 2023, it was announced that Abreu would join Brazilian side Botafogo, where his father had also played, on a season-long loan deal. On signing, he recalled that he had watched Botafogo games live as a child, during his father's spell with the club.

=== Tijuana ===
In January 2026, Abreu joined Tijuana, a club coached by his father Sebastián Abreu.

== International career ==
Eligible to represent Italy, Mexico, and Uruguay, Abreu represented Mexico from under-17 to under-20 level. In February 2021, he stated that he had not yet decided who he wanted to play for, also expressing his desire to represent Uruguay at international level. He received his first call-up to the Uruguay under-20 side for a training camp in September of the same year, before featuring for Mexico's under-20s in two friendlies against France and England in October, scoring against the former.

In December 2021, he was called up to the Uruguay under-20 side again by coach Gustavo Ferreyra and scored in a friendly against Chile in a 1–1 friendly draw. He played in a second friendly game against Colombia but suffered a cruciate ligament injury in the game, which required surgery in February 2022, before he returned in September of the same year. In December 2022, he scored another goal against Chile at under-20 level in a 2–0 win.

== Career statistics ==
=== Club ===
As of 22 November 2026

Appearances and goals by club, season and competition
Club	Season	League			Cup		Continental		Other		Total	
Club	Season	Division	Apps	Goals	Apps	Goals	Apps	Goals	Apps	Goals	Apps	Goals
Defensor Sporting	2025	Liga AUF Uruguaya	29	7	2	1	1 (Note: Appearance in Copa Libertadores)	0	—		32	8
Tijuana	2025–26	Liga MX	12	3	—		—		—		12	3
Tijuana	2026–27	Liga MX	12	0	—		—		1 (Note: Appearances in Leagues Cup)	0	13	0
Tijuana	Total		24	3	—		—		1	0	25	3
Career total			53	10	2	1	1	0	1	0	57	11
