= Estadio Óscar Quiteño =

Stadium in Santa Ana, El Salvador

- Cubil Felino "Feline Den"; La Cueva del Tigre "The Tiger Cave"
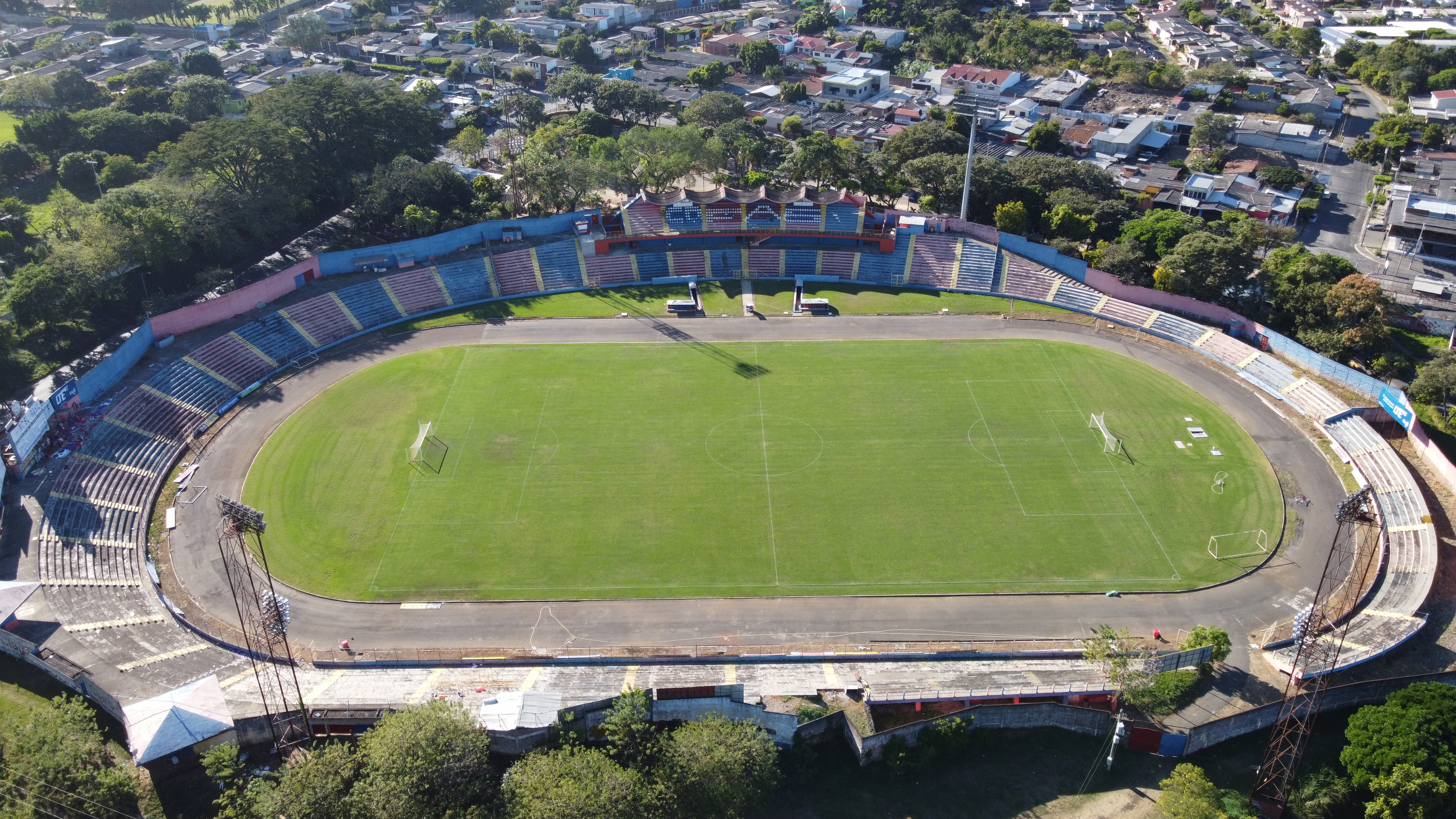
- Interactive map of Estadio Óscar Quiteño
- Full name: Stadium Olympic Oscar Alberto Quiteño
- Former names: Stadium Santaneco
- Location: Santa Ana, El Salvador
- Coordinates: 13.9768°N 89.5695°W
- Owner: Municipal Office of Santa Ana
- Operator: Club Deportivo FAS
- Capacity: 17,500
- Surface: Lawn
- Scoreboard: electronic
- Record attendance: 20,000
- Field size: 105 m × 70 m (344 ft × 230 ft)
- Field shape: lawn Bermuda New Zealander

Construction
- Groundbreaking: March 1960
- Built: December 1962
- Opened: January 1963
- Renovated: 2007–2010, 2018
- Cost: 1,250,000 Colones
- Architect: Antonio Portillo
- Project manager: Municipal Office of Santa Ana
- Structural engineer: Antonio Portillo
- Services engineer: Municipal Office of Santa Ana
- General contractor: Municipal Office of Santa Ana
- Main contractor: Institute of rural colonization of Santa Ana

Tenant
- C.D. FAS (1963–present)

Website
- www.clubdeportivofas.com
- League of El Salvador (football) – Cup of Nations – Classification of CONCACAF 2012 – El Salvador national football team

Estadio Óscar Quiteño is a multi-purpose stadium in Santa Ana, El Salvador.

It is currently used mostly for football matches, and is the home stadium of Club Deportivo FAS.

The stadium holds 17,500 people and was built in 1963.

== Inauguration ==
The stadium was inaugurated on February 3, 1963 and built by the Institute of Rural Development. It sports the name of the goalkeeper 'Óscar Alberto Quiteño' , who died in a friendly match against Orión of Costa Rica; The said Santana stadium was named Óscar Quiteño (in honor of Óscar Alberto Quiteño) on May 15, 1977; Thanks to the initiative of Professor Fidel Antonio Magaña. The opening match of the stadium faced C.D. FAS and the Gold of Mexico, which was won by the latter.

== History ==
The first football scene of Santa Ana was the field of the Finca Model, where FAS won its first 5 championships. It was the October 17, 1962 when a meeting was held to begin the preparation for the construction of the new stadium, which was inaugurated February 3, 1963. The property belongs to the Municipal Hall of Santa Ana, but it is administered as comodato by C.D. FAS.

== Design ==
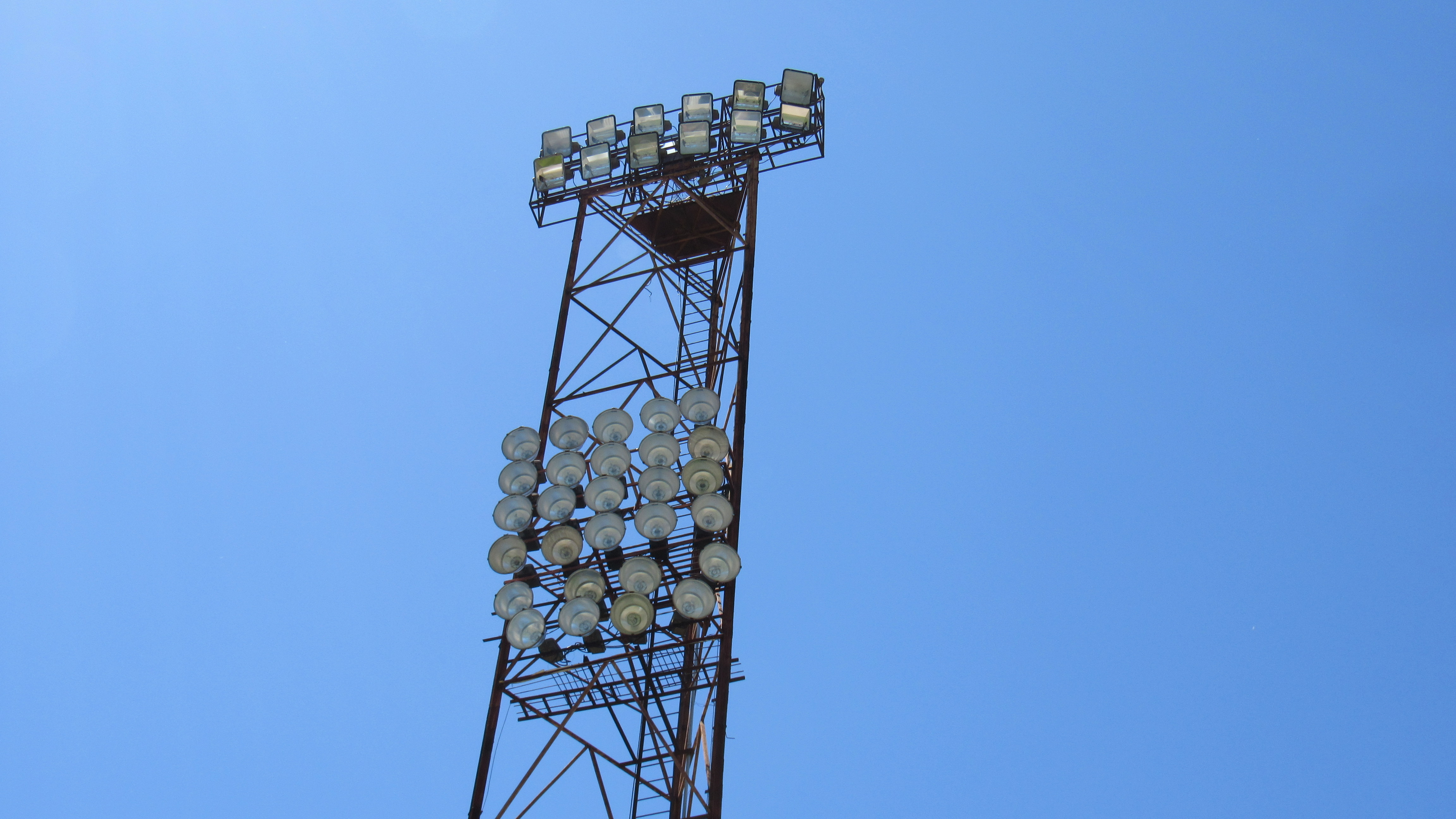
View of the Towers of illumination

It has a capacity to accommodate 17,500 people, with the latest extensions that have been made and is the largest stadium in the western area of El Salvador. It has 4 lighting towers on each side, east and west each tower has 2 lines of 6 fans and 28 halogen for a total of 40 per tower. In addition it has 10 access doors and 6 to the court, which is covered with grass Bermuda Neozelandeza and has an extension of 105 x 70 meters.

In June 2014, remodeling work was done so that the Club Deportivo FAS team could play their games for the CONCACAF Champions League tournament, as a local, these works included the remodeling in the substitute players bench and Technical staff, as well as the engravings of the court, general interior and exterior painting, new luminaires as well as an asphalt layer repair on the track.

== Current events ==
The stadium has been waiting for 3 years to be remodeled, of the National Institute of Sports of El Salvador, but the delay of the works has the stadium in bad condition, even so it is acceptable for matches of football of the local team, with the renovations and extensions that are made the stadium will increase its capacity to 22,500 fans, even with that capacity would still be the third of the country, but for a short time their capacity will be relieved to the fourth place when the Estadio Juan Francisco Barraza of San Miguel is finished its capacity would increase to 20 thousand. The Estadio Oscar Quiteño has its surroundings to be able to continue expanding its infrastructure and to be able to turn it into a stadium of first level, the proposals are varied, acceptable and modern.

On May 27, 2025 An agreement was signed by Gustavo Acevedo (Mayor of Santa Ana) and Yamil Bukele (the director of National Institute of Sports of El Salvador) for a major redevelopment which will comply with FIFA rules, allowing CONCACAF and International games to be played, this will be the first major redevelopment of the stadium since the stadium was inaugurated in 1963.

== Facilities and capacity ==
The Olympic Oscar Alberto Quiteño has a capacity to accommodate 17,500 people comfortably seated and is the third largest stadium in El Salvador.

- 'The Stadium has the following specifications:'
- Olympic track for athletics (not a regulation track)
- 6 entrance tickets to the stadium.
- 5 lockers available for ticket sales.
- It has good drainage.
- 2 dressing rooms for local and visiting team
- A High Tribune
- Movable internal sound system
- Cabins for radio and television.
- 4 towers of lighting on each side, east and west. Each tower has 2 lines of 6 fans and 28 halogen for a total of 40 per tower.
- Own parking for 150 vehicles.

Location	Capacity according to the Mayor's Office of Santa Ana
General (SOL)	8,000
North Sector	1,500
South Sector	2,700
Low Tribune	4,800
High Tribune	500
TOTAL	17,500

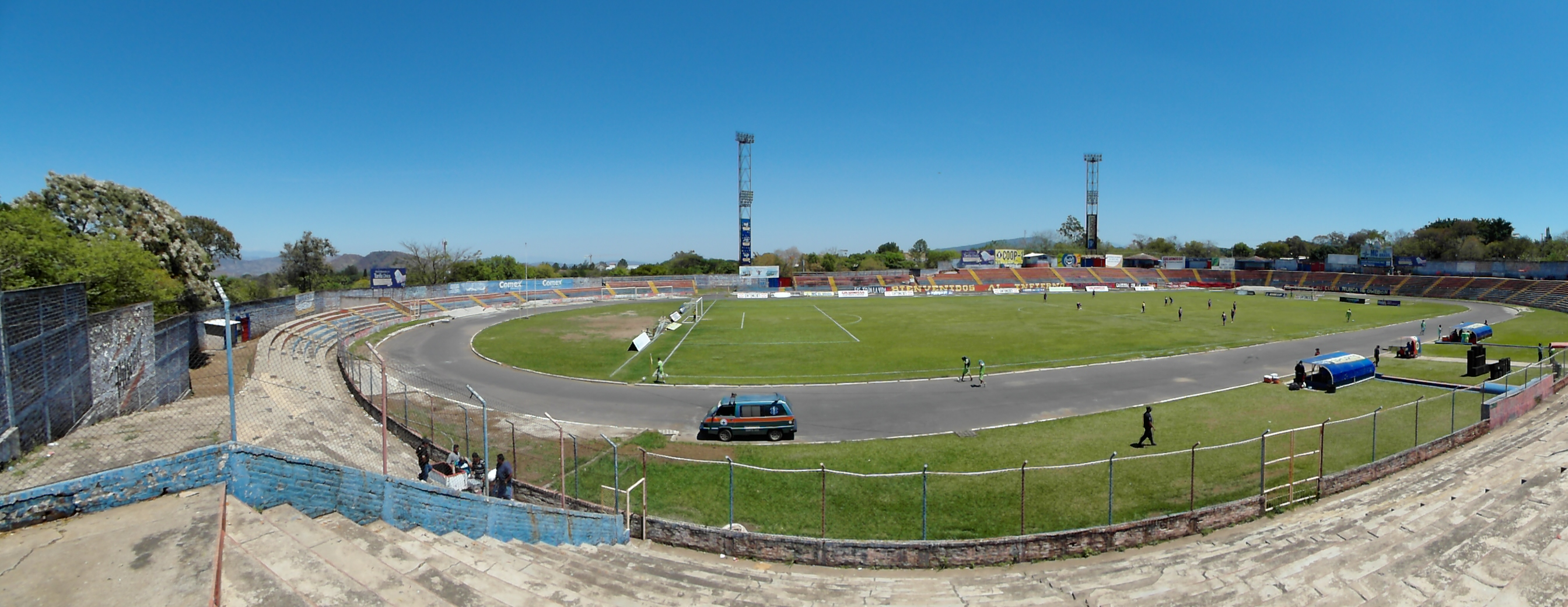
Panoramica del Estadio Oscar Alberto Quiteño

Estadio Óscar Quiteño was named after a goalkeeper who died in 1964, during a friendly match against Orión of Costa Rica.
