= Jairo Henríquez =

Salvadoran footballer (born 1993)

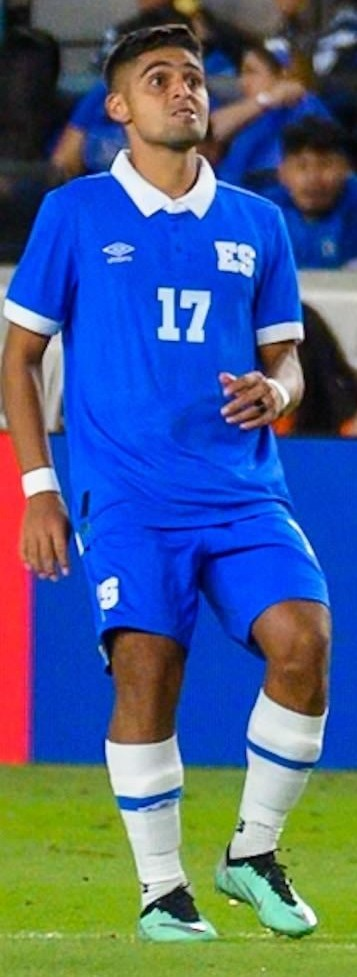
- Henríquez with El Salvador in 2025

Personal information
- Full name: Jairo Mauricio Henríquez Ferrufino
- Date of birth: 31 August 1993 (age 33)
- Place of birth: San Salvador, El Salvador
- Height: 1.73 m (5 ft 8 in)
- Position: Midfielder

Team information
- Current team: Aguila
- Number: 17

Youth career
- 2005–2010: Turín FESA

Senior career*
Years	Team	Apps	(Gls)
2010–2013	Turín FESA		
2014–2015	Tlaxcala	11	(1)
2015–2018	FAS	84	(2)
2018	Municipal Limeño	21	(0)
2018–2019	Santa Tecla	45	(1)
2019–2021	Chalatenango	56	(7)
2021–2022	Águila	31	(3)
2022–2024	Colorado Springs Switchbacks	68	(14)
2025–	Águila	23	(6)

International career^{‡}
2012–2013	El Salvador U20	14	(4)
2014	El Salvador U21	3	(0)
2015	El Salvador U23		
2015–	El Salvador	63	(5)
- * Club domestic league appearances and goals as of 4 November 2024 ‡ National team caps and goals as of 9 June 2024

Jairo Mauricio Henríquez Ferrufino (born 31 August 1993) is a Salvadoran professional footballer who plays as a midfielder for Salvadoran Primera Division club Águila and the El Salvador national team.

== Club career ==
=== Turín FESA ===
Henríquez started his youth career at Turín FESA. He came to play professionally for the club in 2013.

=== Tlaxcala ===
During the early part of 2014. Henríquez joined Liga Premier de México club Tlaxcala. Despite a great start to the 2014 Clausura, even scoring in a victory against Potros UAEM, his team was eliminated in the semifinals of the playoffs, after a 3-1 aggregate defeat against Cimarrones de Sonora.

=== FAS ===
In January 2015, Henríquez signed with FAS. In November 2016, he scored a crucial goal in a 1–1 draw against Águila, in the first leg of the quarterfinals of the Apertura 2016, at the Estadio Óscar Quiteño. Nonetheless, FAS lost 1–3 on aggregate.

=== Municipal Limeño ===
Henríquez signed with Municipal Limeño for the Clausura 2018.

=== Santa Tecla ===
On 22 May 2018, Henríquez signed with Santa Tecla FC for the Apertura 2018. Henríquez scored a crucial goal in a 3–2 win against Águila in the Estadio Juan Francisco Barraza, on 5 December 2018. On 16 December 2018, his team won the Apertura 2018, by defeating Alianza 2–1 in the final. On 30 April 2019, Santa Tecla defeated Audaz 1–0 in the final of the c.

=== Chalatenango ===
In the summer of 2019, Henríquez joined Chalatenango for the Apertura 2019.

=== Águila ===
Henríquez joined Águila on 13 May 2021.

=== Colorado Springs Switchback ===
On 1 June 2022, Henríquez joined Colorado Springs Switchbacks on an undisclosed deal. On 13 June 2023, he was included in the team of the week in the USL.

== International career ==
Henríquez was called up to the 2013 FIFA U-20 World Cup. He was called up to the El Salvador team for the 2015 CONCACAF Gold Cup, where he played in El Salvador's second game against Costa Rica.

== Career statistics ==
=== Club ===
As of 7 December 2023

Appearances and goals by club, season and competition
Club	Season	League			National Cup		Continental		Total	
Club	Season	Division	Apps	Goals	Apps	Goals	Apps	Goals	Apps	Goals
Tlaxcala	2014–15	Liga Premier de México	11	1	0	0	—		11	1
FAS	2014–15	Salvadorian Primera División	19	0	0	0	—		19	0
FAS	2015–16	Salvadorian Primera División	16	0	0	0	—		16	0
FAS	2016–17	Salvadorian Primera División	31	2	0	0	—		31	2
FAS	2017–18	Salvadorian Primera División	18	0	0	0	—		18	0
FAS	Total		84	2	0	0	0	0	84	2
Municipal Limeño	2017–18	Salvadorian Primera División	17	0	0	0	—		17	0
Santa Tecla	2018–19	Salvadorian Primera División	45	1	0	0	2 (Note: Appearances in CONCACAF League)	0	47	1
Chalatenango	2019–20	Salvadorian Primera División	27	4	0	0	—		27	4
Chalatenango	2020–21	Salvadorian Primera División	29	3	0	0	—		29	3
Chalatenango	Total		56	7	0	0	0	0	56	7
Águila	2021–22	Salvadorian Primera División	31	3	0	0	—		31	3
Colorado Springs Switchbacks	2022	USL Championship	15	4	0	0	—		15	4
Colorado Springs Switchbacks	2023	USL Championship	23	6	1	0	—		24	6
Colorado Springs Switchbacks	Total		54	10	1	0	0	0	55	10
Career total			286	24	1	0	2	0	289	25

=== International ===
Scores and results list El Salvador's goal tally first, score column indicates score after each Henríquez goal.

List of international goals scored by Jairo Henríquez
No.	Date	Venue	Opponent	Score	Result	Competition
1	15 July 2021	Toyota Stadium, Frisco, United States	Trinidad and Tobago	1–0	2–0	2021 CONCACAF Gold Cup
2	10 October 2021	Estadio Nacional, San José, Costa Rica	Costa Rica	1–0	1–2	2022 FIFA World Cup qualification
3	16 November 2021	Estadio Rommel Fernández, Panama City, Panama	Panama	1–0	1–2	2022 FIFA World Cup qualification
4	1 May 2022	WakeMed Soccer Park, Cary, United States	Panama	3–2	3–2	Friendly
5	9 June 2024	Dr. Ir. Franklin Essed Stadion, Paramaribo, Suriname	Saint Vincent and the Grenadines	1–0	3–1	2026 FIFA World Cup qualification

== Honours ==
Santa Tecla FC

- Primera División: Apertura 2018
- Copa El Salvador: 2018–19

Colorado Springs Switchbacks

- USL Championship: 2024
