= Guillermo Stradella =

Argentine footballer

Personal information
- Full name: Guillermo Nicolás Stradella
- Date of birth: January 4, 1991 (age 35)
- Place of birth: Porteña, Argentina
- Height: 1.74 m (5 ft 9 in)
- Position: Midfielder

Team information
- Current team: Isidro Metapan
- Number: 22

Senior career*
Years	Team	Apps	(Gls)
–2014	Atlético de Rafaela		
2014–2015	Portuguesa F.C.	28	(0)
2015–2016	Club Sportivo Ben Hur	34	(10)
2016–2023	FAS	292	(35)
2023–2025	Isidro Metapan	60	(8)
- * Club domestic league appearances and goals

Guillermo Nicolás Stradella (born 4 January 1991), commonly known as Guishe, is an Argentine professional footballer who plays as a midfielder for Primera División club Inter FA.

== Career ==
Stradella started his senior career with Atlético de Rafaela. In 2014, he signed for Portuguesa in the Venezuelan Primera División, where he made twenty-eight league appearances and scored zero goals. After that, he played for Club Sportivo Ben Hur and C.D. FAS, where he now plays.

== Honours ==
=== Club ===
FAS

- Salvadoran Primera División: Clausura 2021, Apertura 2022
