= 2005 Copa Presidente =

2005 Copa El Salvador
Tournament details
- Country: El Salvador
- Teams: 36

Final positions
- Champions: Atletico Balboa
- Runners-up: Independiente Nacional 1906

The Copa Presidente 2005 is the first staging of the Copa El Salvador football tournament.

== Participants ==
10 Primera División teams, 12 Liga de Ascenso teams , 14 teams from the Tercera División.

Club	League	Appearance	Last appearance	Previous best
AF de Ilobasco	Liga de Ascenso	TBD	TBD	N/A
Aguila	Primera División	TBD	TBD	N/A
Alianza	Primera División	TBD	TBD	N/A
Atletico Balboa	Primera División	TBD	TBD	N/A
Chalatenango	Primera División	TBD	TBD	N/A
Curazao	Tercera División	TBD	TBD	N/A
El Tercio	Tercera División	TBD	TBD	N/A
España	Tercera División	TBD	TBD	N/A
FAS	Primera División	TBD	TBD	N/A
Fuerte San Francisco	Liga de Ascenso	TBD	TBD	N/A
Independiente	Liga de Ascenso	TBD	TBD	N/A
Isidro Metapan	Primera División	TBD	TBD	N/A
Juventud Independiente	Liga de Ascenso	TBD	TBD	N/A
LA Firpo	Primera División	TBD	TBD	N/A
La Merced	Tercera División	TBD	TBD	N/A
Liberal	Liga de Ascenso	TBD	TBD	N/A
Marte Soyapango	Tercera División	TBD	TBD	N/A
Limeno	Liga de Ascenso	TBD	TBD	N/A
Nacional 1906	Liga de Ascenso	TBD	TBD	N/A
Nejapa F.C.	Liga de Ascenso	TBD	TBD	N/A
Nueva Concepción	Tercera División	TBD	TBD	N/A
Once Lobos	Liga de Ascenso	TBD	TBD	N/A
Once Municipal	Primera División	TBD	TBD	N/A
Pasaquina	Tercera División	TBD	TBD	N/A
Platense	Liga de Ascenso	TBD	TBD	N/A
Real San Martin	Liga de Ascenso	TBD	TBD	N/A
San Pablo Tacachico	Tercera División	TBD	TBD	N/A
San Fidel	Tercera División	TBD	TBD	N/A
San Salvador F.C.	Primera División	TBD	TBD	N/A
TACA	Tercera División	TBD	TBD	N/A
Titan	Tercera División	TBD	TBD	N/A
Topiltzin	Liga de Ascenso	TBD	TBD	N/A
Turin	Tercera División	TBD	TBD	N/A
UES	Tercera División	TBD	TBD	N/A
Villalta Brakes	Tercera División	TBD	TBD	N/A
Vista Hermosa	Primera División	TBD	TBD	N/A

== Final ==
30 November 2005
7:30 pm

Atletico Balboa	2–0	Independiente Nacional 1906
Nelson Reyes		Nil

Estadio Cuscatlán, San Salvador
