= Canal 19 =

Salvadoran TV channel

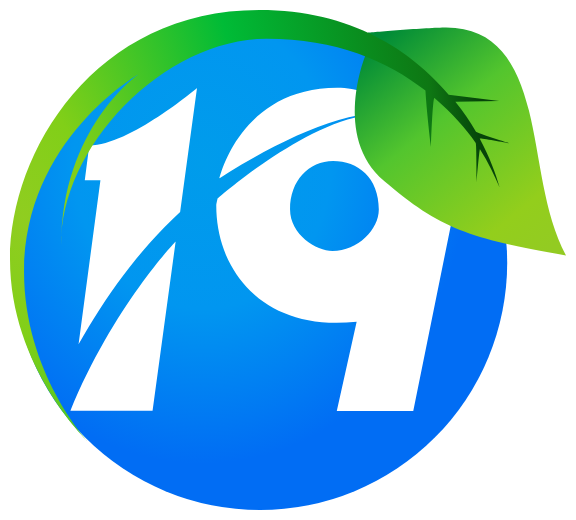
- Country: El Salvador

Programming
- Picture format: 1080i HDTV (downscaled to 480i for the SDTV feed)

Ownership
- Owner: Grupo Megavisión

History
- Launched: 16 November 1995; 30 years ago
- Former names: Meganoticias (2012-2022)

Links
- Website: Grupo Megavisión

Availability

Terrestrial
- Analog UHF: Channel 19

Canal 19, also formerly known as MegaNoticias is a Salvadoran over-the-air television network specialized in news and sports programming. The channel is owned by Grupo Megavisión and has had several changes to its format since its inception.

== History ==
Grupo Megavisión launched Canal 19 in 1995 under the descriptive tagline El Canal de la Mujer. The women's interest format was replaced on January 20, 1999 by a new service airing Nickelodeon programs in the daytime and MTV programs at night. By the mid-2000s Canal 19 broadcast exclusively Nickelodeon content. As of 2009, in addition to the retransmission of Nickelodeon's Latin American feed, the channel also broadcast third-party series that didn't air on the pan-regional Nickelodeon channel, that were acquired by Grupo Megavisión (such as H2O: Just Add Water and Lizzie McGuire). Unlike Nickelodeon, the over-the-air channel broadcast seventeen hours a day, from 6am to 11pm, dividing its schedule between the Channels Nick Jr.'s, NickToons' and MTV's shows, normal animated series and live-action series.

On May 31, 2012, at 11pm, Canal 19 ceased broadcasting in its old format after thirteen years by Viacom's orders, who accused Grupo Megavisión of thwarting the potential of Nickelodeon Latin America's carriage to cable companies in El Salvador. The news hit the staff by surprise, while viewers were infuriated by the decision, especially those who could not afford cable. Grupo Megavisión announced later in June that it would relaunch the channel as a news operation by July 15. The goal was to create El Salvador's first news channel. There was the possibility of delaying the launch due to the possible delays in the arrival of ite equipment. The new format started on September 3.

In early 2024, Grupo Megavisión refused the hypothesis of continuing Fuego Cruzado on Canal 19, which on Canal 21 was replaced by the return of Fanáticos Plus.
