= Diego Coca =

Salvadoran footballer (born 1994)

Personal information
- Full name: Diego Elenison Galdámez Coca
- Date of birth: 26 August 1994 (age 32)
- Place of birth: San Salvador, El Salvador
- Height: 1.67 m (5 ft 6 in)
- Position: Forward

Team information
- Current team: Inter FA
- Number: 19

Youth career
- 2004–2010: Turín FESA

Senior career*
Years	Team	Apps	(Gls)
2010–2011	Turín FESA		
2012–2013	Rush Soccer		
2013–2014	Turín FESA		
2014–2015	Aguila	21	(0)
2016–2017	Limeno	79	(13)
2018–2021	Aguila	104	(9)
2021	Isidro Metapan	20	(0)
2022–2023	Chalatenango	26	(0)
2023	Atletico Marte	19	(0)
2024	Fuerte San Francisco	0	(0)
2024–2025	Dragon		
2025–	Inter FA		

International career^{‡}
2012–	El Salvador U-20	12	(1)
2018–	El Salvador	5	(0)
- * Club domestic league appearances and goals as of 27 June 2012 ‡ National team caps and goals as of 27 June 2012

Diego Elenison Galdámez Coca (born 26 August 1994) is a Salvadoran professional footballer who plays as a forward for Primera División club Inter FA.

== International career ==
=== U20 FIFA World Cup ===
During the 2013 FIFA U-20 World Cup, El Salvador was placed in Group C, where they were drawn against Turkey, Australia, and Colombia. In June 2013, Pena and the rest of the El Salvador team played against Turkey and lost 3–0, Pena then played against Australia, and in a historic game in El Salvador footballing history they won their first game in a World Cup (outside on a beach soccer world cup) 2-1 and he played a major part in the victory scoring the second goal which help secure the result.

== Honours ==
=== International ===
El Salvador U21

- (bronze) : Central American Games 2013
