= Salvadoran Football Federation =

Governing body of association football in El Salvador

CONCACAF
- Founded: 1935; 91 years ago
- Headquarters: Avenida José Matias Delgado Frente al Centro Español Colonia Escalón, Zona 10 San Salvador 1029
- FIFA affiliation: 1936
- CONCACAF affiliation: 1961
- UNCAF affiliation: 1990
- President: Yamil Bukele
- Website: fesfut.org.sv

The Salvadoran Football Federation (Spanish: Federación Salvadoreña de Fútbol or FESFUT) is the official governing football organization in El Salvador and is in charge of the El Salvador national football team, and El Salvador national beach soccer team. The federation is also in charge of the three tiers of domestic club competition, including the top-flight Primera División de Fútbol Profesional.

In May 2010, FIFA briefly suspended teams and associated members from international competition on the grounds that the Salvadoran government had not acknowledged the authority of the Normalisation Committee set up to represent FESFUT. On May 28, the suspension was lifted.

In November 2010 the federation started the first women's football league in El Salvador.

In September 2013, the federation imposed a life-time ban on 14 members of the country's national team for match-fixing and another three players were banned for between six and 18 months. The players were accused of receiving bribes for international matches.

On July 31, 2014, the general assembly of football elected Jorge Alberto Cabrera Rajo as the new president of the federation.

== Board of directors ==
Position	Staff
President	Jorge Alberto Cabrera Rajo
First vice president	Juan Francisco Peñate Ramírez
Second vice president	Víctor Zenón Gómez Escobar
Director	Emerson Ulises Ávalos
Director	Hugo Atilio Carrillo Castillo
Director	Roberto Alcides Ortez Vásquez
Director	Óscar Mauricio García Zometa

Name	Position	Source
(El Salvador) Hugo Carrillo	President	
(El Salvador) Fabio Molina	Vice President	
(El Salvador) Galo Izurieta	General Secretary	
n/a	Treasurer	
(El Salvador) Victorino Rodríguez	Technical Director	
(Colombia) Hernán Darío Gómez	Team Coach (Men's)	
n/a	Team Coach (Women's)	
(El Salvador) Guadalupe Zuñiga	Media/Communications Manager	
n/a	Futsal Coordinator	
(El Salvador) José Edgar Lainez	Chairperson of the Referees Committee	
(El Salvador) Joel Aguilar	Head/Director of the Referees Department	
(El Salvador) Joel Aguilar	Referee Coordinator	

== Referees ==
Position	Staff
International	Joel Antonio Aguilar Chicas
International	Marlon Mejía
International (Women's)	Ivonne Emperatriz Ayala
International (Women's)	Patricia Pacheco
National	Stanli Ademir Mejía
National	Ricardo Siguenza
National (Women's)	Daysi Esperanza Martínez
National (Women's)	Lidia Abigail Ayala

Last updated: 3 November 2010
Source: FESFUT
