= Copa Presidente (El Salvador) =

Salvadoran association football tournament

- Founded: 1939 (original); 2026 (revived)
- Region: El Salvador
- Teams: 24
- Current champions: Santa Tecla (2nd title)
- Most championships: Águila (2 titles); Santa Tecla (2 titles)
- 2026 Copa Presidente (El Salvador)

The Copa Presidente is the top knock-out football tournament in El Salvador. The first edition was played in 1999, resulting champion C.D. Águila of El Salvador. From 2000 to 2006, the competition was played two more times with Atlético Balboa and Once Municipal winning the cup. After a lengthy hiatus that began in 2006, was restored in 2016 The cup is currently sponsored by Claro and thus officially known as the Copa Claro. The Cup tournament is played as a separate tournament from the league (played between First, Second and Third Division).

== History ==
The Copa Presidente was created at the behest of the dictator Maximiliano Hernández Martínez, who provided the trophy and had it named after him. not contested until the 1990s when CONCACAF ordered that El Salvador must have a mandatory national cup in order to gain access to intercontinental competitions and ruled that the regional cups competed for before were insufficient. In 2014, the tournament was briefly brought back played between Águila and FAS. However, the cup turned out to be a one-off event.

== Re-launch ==
On June 16, 2016 it was announced that a new cup competition would be played during Apertura 2016 and Clausura 2017. The tournament will involve 12 teams from the First Division, plus 10 of the Second Division and 10 of the Third Division for a total of 32 participants. The teams will be placed into 8 groups of 4. The 8 group winners, plus the 8 group runners-up, move on to the new round (round of 16). The cup will be called Copa Claro for sponsorship reason and the winner will receive 15,000 dollars.

In 2025, Yamil Bukele, the director of the National Institute of Sports of El Salvador, announced that the Copa Presidente would return the following year.

== List of finals ==
=== Copa Presidente (1939–2013) ===
Year	Champion	Score	Runner-up	Goalscorers for the Champion	Goalscorers for the runner up	Manager
1930–31	CD 33	1–0	Firpo			
1931–32	CD 33	0–0 (4–2 pen.)	Aguilas			
1932–1938	Hiatus					
1938–39	Corsario del Puerto Libertard	4–0	El 44 (Santa Ana)			
1939–1990	Hiatus					
1990–91	Atletico Marte	2–1	LA Firpo	(Brazil) Nildeson (El Salvador) Misael Rodriguez	(El Salvador) Mauricio Cienfuegos	(El Salvador) Armando Contreras Palma
1991–1999	Hiatus					
1999–2000	Águila	3–2	Luis Ángel Firpo	(Argentina) Adrián Mahía (2) (Peru) Paul Cominges	(Brazil) Celio Rodríguez (2)	(Argentina) Hugo Coria
2000-2005	Hiatus					
2005–06	Atlético Balboa	2–0	Independiente Nacional 1906	(El Salvador) Nelson Reyes (2)	None	(Argentina) Jorge García
2006–07	Once Municipal	1–0	Águila	(El Salvador) Mario Deras	None	(El Salvador) Nelson Ancheta
2007–2014	Hiatus					

=== Copa Presidente / Independencia (2014) ===
Year	Champion	Score	Runner-up	Goalscorers for the Champion	Goalscorers for the runner up	Manager
2014–15	Águila	2–0	FAS	(Jamaica) Sean Fraser (Brazil) Ronaille Calheira	None	(Argentina) Daniel Messina

=== Copa Claro (2016–2019) ===
Year	Champion	Score	Runner-up	Manager
2016–17	Santa Tecla	1–0	FAS	(Argentina) Ernesto Corti
2017–18	Hiatus			
2018–19	Santa Tecla	1–0	Audaz	(Uruguay) Sebastián Abreu
2018–2025	Hiatus			

=== Copa Presidente (2026–present) ===
Year	Champion	Score	Runner-up	Manager
2026				

== List of Participants ==
Club	Winners	Runners-up	Winning years
Águila	2	1	1999–2000, 2014–15
Santa Tecla	2	–	2016–17, 2018–19
Once Municipal	1	–	2006–07
Atlético Balboa	1	–	2005–06
Atlético Marte	1	–	1990–91
FAS	-	2	
Luis Ángel Firpo	–	2	
Independiente Nacional 1905	–	1	
Audaz	–	1	
