= André Morales =

Colombian footballer

Personal information
- Full name: André Felipe Morales Mosquera
- Date of birth: 27 November 1999 (age 26)
- Place of birth: Vigía del Fuerte, Colombia
- Height: 1.70 m (5 ft 7 in)
- Position: Winger

Team information
- Current team: Luis Ángel Firpo
- Number: 9

Senior career*
| Years | Team | Apps | (Gls) |
| 2018 | Universitario Popayán | 1 | (0) |
| 2019–2020 | Boca Juniors Cali | 4 | (0) |
| 2021–2023 | Alianza Petrolera | 34 | (1) |
| 2024 | Alianza | 3 | (0) |
| 2025 | Deportes Concepción | 1 | (0) |
| 2026– | Luis Ángel Firpo | 3 | (0) |
- * Club domestic league appearances and goals as of 23 February 2026

André Felipe Morales Mosquera (born 27 November 1999) is a Colombian professional footballer who plays as a winger for Salvadoran club Luis Ángel Firpo.

== Club career ==
Born in Vigía del Fuerte, Colombia, Morales started his career with Universitario Popayán and Boca Juniors de Cali in the Colombian second level.

In 2021, Morales signed with Alianza Petrolera in the Colombian top level and spent three years with them. He continued with Alianza in 2024.

In 2025, Morales moved to Chile and signed with Deportes Concepción.

In January 2026, Morales moved to El Salvador and joined Luis Ángel Firpo.
