= Yamil Bukele =

Salvadoran sports executive and basketball player

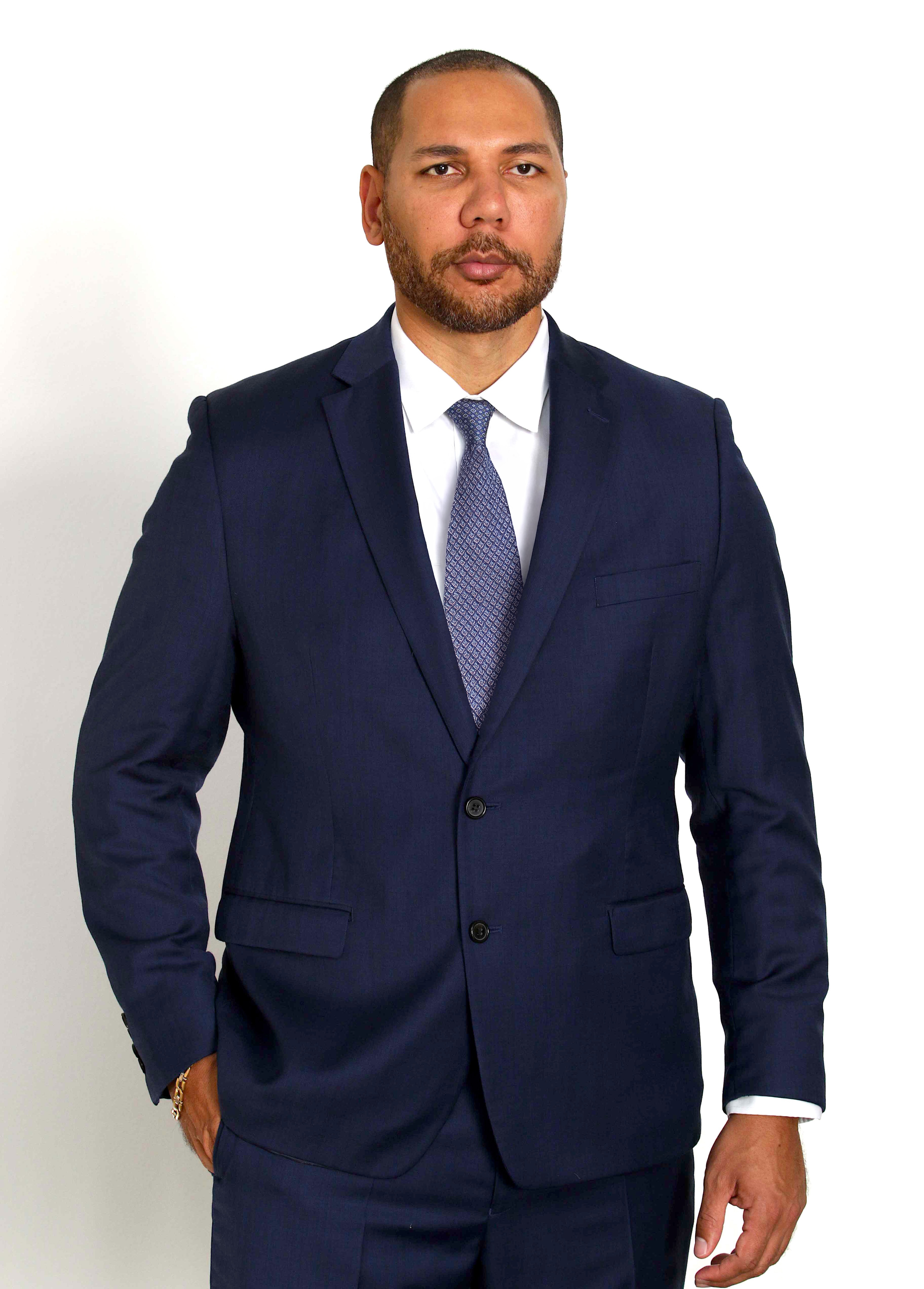
- Bukele in 2023

Director of the National Institute of Sports of El Salvador
- Incumbent
- Assumed office June 2019
- President: Nayib Bukele

Member of the FIBA Central Board
- Incumbent
- Assumed office 23 August 2023

Second Vice President of FIBA Americas
- In office 16 June 2019 – 23 August 2023

Personal details
- Born: Yamil Alejandro Bukele Pérez; 23 January 1978 (age 48) San Andrés, Colombia
- Spouse: Rebeca Elisa Sánchez Montes
- Children: 2
- Parents: Armando Bukele Kattán (father); Bernarda Rosa Pérez Pomare (mother)
- Relatives: Nayib Bukele (half-brother)
- Occupation: Sports executive, businessman, basketball player
- Basketball career

Career information
- Playing career: 2007–2012

Career history
- 2007–2012: Los Soles de San Andrés

Yamil Alejandro Bukele Pérez (born 23 January 1978) is a Salvadoran-Colombian sports executive, businessman, and former basketball player. Bukele has served as the director of the National Institute of Sports of El Salvador (INDES) since 2019 and as a member of the FIBA Central Board since 2023. From 2019 to 2023, he also served as the second vice president of FIBA Americas.

== Early life ==
Yamil Alejandro Bukele Pérez was born on 23 January 1978 on the Colombian island of San Andrés. His parents were Armando Bukele Kattán and Bernarda Rosa Pérez Pomare and was the couple's only child. His father was of Palestinian ancestry and his mother was of Colombian ancestry. Bukele has nine half-siblings through his father, including Nayib Bukele who has served as President of El Salvador since 2019.

Bukele played basketball for Los Soles de San Andrés (a team he helped establish) that played in the Colombian Professional Basketball League from 2007 to 2012. Bukele also played for the El Salvador men's national basketball team in 2008. Bukele attended university in El Salvador and graduated as a Bachelor of Business Administration. He later attended the University of the Americas and graduated with a degree in marketing and advertising.

== Career ==
=== In El Salvador ===
From 2015 to 2018, Bukele served as the president of the Municipal Institute of Sports and Recreation of San Salvador when Nayib served as the city's mayor. Bukele's appointment by Nayib was criticized by both the right-wing Nationalist Republican Alliance (ARENA) and the left-wing Farabundo Martí National Liberation Front (FMLN). In 2019, Bukele became the president of the Salvadoran Basketball Federation (FESABAL). He also serves as the president of the Central American and Caribbean Basketball Confederation (CONCENCABA).

In 2019, Nayib appointed Bukele as the director of the National Institute of Sports of El Salvador (INDES). Bukele was the president of the Organizing Committee of the 2023 Central American and Caribbean Games that were held in El Salvador. In February 2025, Bukele confirmed that Copa INDES (formerly the Copa El Salvador) would be resurrected for the 2025 season of professional football in El Salvador. In March 2025, Bukele announced that the National Stadium of El Salvador would be inaugurated in 2027.

=== FIBA ===
In 2019, Bukele was elected as the second vice president of FIBA Americas for a four year term. In 2023, he was elected as a member of the FIBA Central Board for a four year term.

== Personal life ==
Bukele married Rebeca Elisa Sánchez Montes, a Costa Rican. The couple has two children. One of his children, Ivanka Bukele, is a professional swimmer that represents El Salvador at international competitions.
