= Gustavo Machado (footballer) =

Uruguayan association football player

Personal information
- Full name: Gustavo Ezequiel Machado Ferrando
- Date of birth: 23 June 2001 (age 25)
- Place of birth: Lanús, Argentina
- Height: 1.75 m (5 ft 9 in)
- Position: Midfielder

Team information
- Current team: Rampla Juniors
- Number: 11

Youth career
- Rampla Juniors

Senior career*
| Years | Team | Apps | (Gls) |
| 2019–2021 | Rampla Juniors | 19 | (2) |
| 2021–2023 | Cerro Largo | 24 | (0) |
| 2022–2023 | → Rampla Juniors (loan) | 13 | (1) |
| 2024– | Rampla Juniors | 13 | (0) |
- * Club domestic league appearances and goals as of 14 September 2024

Gustavo Ezequiel Machado Ferrando (born 23 June 2001) is a Uruguayan professional footballer who plays as a midfielder for Rampla Juniors.

== Career ==
A youth academy graduate of Rampla Juniors, Machado made his professional debut on 14 July 2019 in a 0–1 loss against Fénix. He joined Cerro Largo in March 2021.

Born in Argentina, Machado represents Uruguay at international level. He was part of Uruguay under-20 team.

== Career statistics ==
=== Club ===
As of 3 July 2021

Appearances and goals by club, season and competition
| Club | Season | League | | | Cup | | Continental | | Other | | Total | |
| Club | Season | Division | Apps | Goals | Apps | Goals | Apps | Goals | Apps | Goals | Apps | Goals |
|---|---|---|---|---|---|---|---|---|---|---|---|---|
| Rampla Juniors | 2019 | Primera División | 5 | 0 | — | | — | | — | | 5 | 0 |
| Rampla Juniors | 2020 | Segunda División | 14 | 2 | — | | — | | 4 (Note: Appearances in Segunda División play-offs.) | 2 | 18 | 4 |
| Rampla Juniors | Total | | 19 | 2 | 0 | 0 | 0 | 0 | 4 | 2 | 23 | 4 |
| Cerro Largo | 2021 | Primera División | 5 | 0 | — | | 2 (Note: Appearances in Copa Sudamericana.) | 0 | — | | 7 | 0 |
| Career total | | | 24 | 2 | 0 | 0 | 2 | 0 | 4 | 2 | 30 | 4 |
