= 2018–19 Copa El Salvador =

Tournament details
- Country: El Salvador
- Teams: 32

Final positions
- Champions: Santa Tecla
- Runners-up: Audaz

Tournament statistics
- Matches played: 61 games
- Top goal scorer(s): (El Salvador) Bryan Paz (El Salvador) Edwin Ruano (El Salvador) Ezequiel Rivas (Colombia) Jhon Machado (4 goals each)

The Copa El Salvador 2018–19 is the sixth staging of the Copa El Salvador football tournament and the second straight edition played since being brought back from its hiatus.

This tournament started on 13 November 2018.

== Participants ==
This tournament will feature all the clubs from the Salvadoran Primera División, 10 from the Segunda División, and 10 from the Tercera División.

The following 32 teams qualified for the tournament:

Team	Appearance	Last appearance	Previous best
Salvadoran Primera División (12 teams)
Aguila	4	2016–17	Champions (1999–00, 2014–15)
Alianza	4	2016–17	Semi-preliminary final (2005–06, 2016–17)
Audaz	1	2016–17	Group Stage (2016–17)
Chalatenango	4	2016–17	Round 3 (2005–06)
FAS	4	2016–17	Runners-up (2016–17)
Firpo	4	2016–17	Runners-up (1999–00)
Isidro Metapan	4	2016–17	Quarter Final (1999–00, 2005–06, 2006–07, 2016–17)
Jocoro	1	2016–17	Quarter Finals (2016–17)
Limeno	4	2016–17	Quarter Finals (2016–17)
Pasaquina	3	2016–17	Quarter Finals (2016–17)
Santa Tecla	2	2016–17	Champions (2016–17)
Sonsonate	1	2016–17	Group Stage (2016–17)
Segunda División (10 teams)
Brujos de Izalco	None	First Appearance	None
Independiente	3	2006–07	Quarterfinal (2006–07)
Rácing Jr	None	First Appearance	None
Once Lobos	3	2016–17	Round 5 (2005–06)
Santa Rosa	None	First Appearance	None
Vendaval	2	2016–17	Round 2 (2005–06)
Liberal	1	2005–06	Round 4 (2005–06)
Dragon	3	2016–17	Quarterfinal (2006–07)
El Vencedor	2	2005–06	Round 2 (2005–06)
Platense	2	2005–06	Round 4 (2005–06)
Tercera División (10 teams)
Juventud Independiente	3	2006–07	Semi-Finalist (2006–07)
SID Municipal	None	First Appearance	None
Turin FESA	1	2005–06	Round 3 (2005–06)
Juventud Cara Sucia	2	2016–17	Quarterfinal (2016–17)
Dulce Nombre Maria	None	First Appearance	None
ADEREL Lourdes	None	First Appearance	None
Jalacatal FC	None	First Appearance	None
Mar y Plata	1	1999–20	Round 1
Cacaguatique	None	First Appearance	None
UES	4	2016–17	Round 3 (2005–06)

== Round of 32 ==
Team 1	Agg.	Team 2	1st leg	2nd leg
FAS (1)	3–2	Brujos de Izalco (2)	2–2	1–0
Santa Tecla (1)	5–2	Juventud Independiente (3)	2–1	3–1
Alianza (1)	5–1	Independiente (1)	2–1	3–0 (Awarded)
Sonsonate (1)	6–2	SID Municipal (3)	1–2	5–0
Isidro Metapan (1)	4–3	Rácing Jr (2)	3–1	1–2
Chalatenango (1)	4–4 (3–4 p)	Turin FESA (3)	0–2	4–2
Once Lobos (2)	4–4 (4–3 p)	Juventud Cara Sucia(3)	2–3	2–1
Santa Rosa (2)	7–4	Dulce Nombre Maria (3)	4–3	3–1
Vendaval (2)	4–2	ADEREL Lourdes (3)	2–1	2–1
Audaz (1)	1–1 (5–4 p)	Platense (2)	0–0	1–1
Pasaquina (1)	2–4	Jalacatal FC (3)	1–2	1–2
Aguila (1)	7–2	Liberal (2)	4–2	3–0
Limeno (1)	2–4	Mar y Plata (3)	2–2	0–2 (Awarded)
Firpo (1)	3–1	Dragon (2)	0–1	3–0 (Awarded)
Jocoro (1)	3–1	Chacahuatique (3)	1–1	2–0
El Vencedor (2)	5–3	UES (3)	1–2	4–1

=== First leg ===
November 13, 2018	Dragon	1–0	Firpo	San Miguel, El Salvador
15:00	Jefrey Sandoval		Nil	Stadium: Estadio Juan Francisco Barraza

November 13, 2018	Jalacatal F.C.	2–1	Pasaquina	San Miguel, El Salvador
15:00	Manfredy Sosa; Ernesto Hernández		Arquímedes Urrutia	Stadium: Estadio Municipal de Quelapa

November 13, 2018	Juventud Cara Sucia	3–2	Once Lobos	Ahuachapan
15:00	Henry Cortéz 25'; Héctor Ayala 37' 44'		Michael López 9'; Edwin Ruano 24'	Stadium: Cancha INDES Barrio el Cayario

November 13, 2018	Dulce Nombre de Maria	3–4	A.D. Santa Rosa Guachipilin	Chalatenango
15:00	Juan Landaverde; Bladimir Figueroa		Ricardo Ulloa; Óscar Ulloa; Iván Lemus	Stadium: Complejo Deportivo Municipal

November 13, 2018	Racing jr	1–3	Isidro Metapan	Armenia, Sonsonate
15:00	Aquiles Méndez 57'		Cristian Cisneros 61' 91'; Walter Molina 51'	Stadium: Estadio 21 de Noviembre

November 14, 2018	Juventud Independiente	1–2	Santa Tecla	La Libertad
15:00	Marcos Alemán		Edwin Portillo (o.g.); Derby Carrillo	Stadium: Complejo Deportivo de San Juan Opico

November 14, 2018	Independiente F.C.	1–2	Alianza F.C.	San Vicente
15:00	Alfredo Hernández 40'		Ezequiel Rivas 49'; Dario Ferreira 82'	Stadium: Estadio Jiboa

November 14, 2018	C.D. Chacahuatique	1–1	Jocoro F.C.	San Miguel
15:00	Wendel Amaya		Ronald Torres	Stadium: Cancha Chapeltique

November 14, 2018	Aderel Lourdes	1–2	Vendaval	La Libertad
15:00	Jaime Renderos		Kevin Barahona; Luis Castillo	Stadium: Polideportivo Loudres Colon

November 14, 2018	Platense	0–0	Audaz	Zacatecoluca
15:00	Nil		Nil	Stadium: Estadio Panoramico Antonio Toledo Valle

November 14, 2018	UES	2–1	El Vencedor	San Salvador
15:00	Sergio Calero		Jhon Machado 51'	Stadium: Estadio Heroes y Martires 30 de Julio

November 15, 2018	Turin F.C.	2–0	Chalatenango	Guazapa, El Salvador
15:00	Aníbal Parada 37'; Melvin Cartagena 80'		Nil	Stadium: Complejo Teofilo J Siman

November 15, 2018	SID Municipal	2–1	Sonsonate	Sonsonate
15:00	Goal		Luis Canales	Stadium: Cancha Municipal Ciriaco Guevara Ishuatan

November 15, 2018	Brujos Mario Calvo	2–2	FAS	Izalco, Sonsonate
15:00	Christian Gil Mosquera 8'; Raúl Portillo		Wilbert Chachagua 34'; Juan Carlos Moscoso 69'	Stadium: Estadio Salvador Mariona

November 15, 2018	Liberal	2–4	Aguila	San Miguel
15:00	Rommel Mejía 67' 70'		Joaquín Verges 13'; Carlos Ortiz 14'; Bryan Paz 49'; Waldemar Acosta 65'	Stadium: Estadio Municipal de Quelapa

November 15, 2018	C.D. Mar y Plata	2–2	Limeno	Puerto El Triunfo, Usulutan
15:00	Carlos Rinaldi 40'; Melvin Hernández 69'		Francisco Valladares 37'; Derwin Hernández 62'	Stadium: Cancha Mar y Plata

=== Second leg ===
January 15, 2019	Pasaquina	1–2 (2–4 agg.)	Jalacatal F.C.	TBD
3:00pm	Christian Bautista		Manfredi Sosa; Alexis Sánchez	Stadium: TBD

January 15, 2019	Jocoro F.C.	2–0 (3–1 agg.)	C.D. Chacahuatique	Morazán
3:15pm	Christian Maciel; Edgar Cruz		Nil	Stadium: Estadio Correcaminos

January 15, 2019	Santa Tecla	3–1 (2–5 agg.)	Juventud Independiente	Santa Tecla
7:00pm	Wilma Torres 13' 42'; Gaston Colman 61'		Andres Flores Jaco 25' (o.g.)	Stadium: Estadio Las Delicias

January 16, 2019	C.D. Sonsonate	5–0 (6–2 agg.)	SID Municipal	Sonsonate
7:00pm	Armando Polo 50' 84'; Marvin Durango 40'; Mario Espinoza 53'; Abdiel Macea 70'		Nil	Stadium: Estadio Ana Mercedes Campos

January 17, 2019	Limeno	2–1 (0–2) (Awarded) (2–4 agg.)	Mar y Plata	Santa Rosa de Lima, La Union
3:00pm	Mario Machado; Kevin Oviedo		Luis Gámez	Stadium: Estadio Roman Flores Berrios

January 17, 2019	Chalatenango	4–2 (4–4 agg.) (3–4 p)	Turin	Chalatenango
	Brayan Landaverde; Miguel Lemus; Joel Ortega		Kevin Menjivar; Andres Gonzales	Stadium: Estadio José Gregorio Martínez

N/A	Firpo	3–0 (Awarded) (3–1 agg.)	Dragon	N/A
N/A	N/A		N/A	Stadium: N/A

N/A	Alianza F.C.	3–0 (Awarded) (5–1 agg.)	Independiente F.C.	N/A
N/A	N/A		N/A	Stadium: N/A; Attendance: N/A; Referee: N/A

January 29, 2019	Once Lobos	2–1 (4–4 agg.) (4–3 p)	Juventud Cara Sucia	Chalchuapa, Santa Ana
3:00pm	Jorge Molina; Milton Santana		Venilson Castro	Stadium: Estadio Chalchuapa

January 30, 2019	Santa Rosa Guachipilin	3–1 (7–4 agg.)	Dulce de Nombre Maria	Santa Ana
3:00pm	TBD		TBD	Stadium: Estadio José Hernández

January 30, 2019	Isidro Metapan	1–2 (4–3 agg.)	Racing Jr	Metapán, Santa Ana
7:00 p.m	Marvin Molina 47'		Eliseo Fernandez 21'; Ivan Suazo 82' (o.g.)	Stadium: Estadio Jorge Calero Suárez

January 30, 2019	Vendaval	2–1 (4–2 agg.)	Aderel Lourdes	Apopa
	Victor Barrera; William Barrios		TBD 53'	Stadium: Cancha " Joaquin Gutierres"

January 30, 2019	El Vencedor	4–1 (5–3 agg.)	UES	Santa Elena, Usulután
	Rusvel Saravia; Jhon Machado; Javier Hernandez		Steven Cruz 46'	Stadium: Estadio German Rivas Lozano

January 31, 2019	FAS	1–0 (3–2 agg.)	Brujos del Izalco	Achuapan
3:00pm	David Rugamas 42'		Nil	Stadium: Estadio Simeón Magaña

January 31, 2019	Audaz	1–1 (1–1 agg.) (5–4 p)	Platense	San Vicente
3:00pm	José Mayky Henríquez 35' (o.g.)		Édgar Valladares 61'	Stadium: Cancha Jiboa

February 4, 2019	Aguila	3–0 (7–2 agg.)	Liberal	San Miguel, El Salvador
3:00pm	Bryan Paz 29'; Joaquin Verges 44'; Ortíz 60'		Nil	Stadium: Estadio Juan Francisco Barraza; Referee: Mirian León Serpas

== Round of 16 ==
The Round of 16 draw took place on February 1, 2019 . The first leg took place in the first week of February and the return leg the last week of February. Jalacatal FC, Mar y Plata and Turin FESA from Tercera División (third tier), are the lowest-ranked team still in the competition.

=== Qualified teams ===
Primera Division

- Metapan (1)
- FAS (1)
- Santa Tecla (1)
- Firpo (1)
- Jocoro (1)
- Alianza (1)
- Audaz (1)
- Sonsonate (1)
- Aguila (1)

Segunda/Tercera division

- El Vencedor (2)
- Once Lobos (2)
- Santa Rosa (2)
- Vendaval (2)
- Jalacatal FC (3)
- Mar y Plata (3)
- Turin FESA (3)

Team 1	Agg.	Team 2	1st leg	2nd leg
FAS (1)	2–0	Sonsonate (1)	0–0	2–0
Metapan (1)	4–5	Once Lobos (2)	2–3	2–2
Santa Tecla (1)	1–0	Turin FESA (3)	0–0	1–0
Alianza (1)	12–2	Santa Rosa (2)	6–2	6–0
Mar y Plata (3)	0–0 (3–4 p)	Firpo (1)	0–0	0–0
Jalacatal FC (3)	1–4	Aguila (1)	1–3	0–1
El Vencedor (2)	1–1 (7–8 p)	Jocoro (1)	1–1	0–0
Vendaval (1)	1–1 (4–5 p)	Audaz (1)	0–1	1–0

==== First leg ====
February 5, 2019	Turin FESA	0–0	Santa Tecla	Complejo Teofilo J. Siman
3:00pm	Nil		Nil

February 5, 2019	Once Lobos	3–2	Metapan	Estadio Once Lobos
3:00pm	Ronald Villalba 51'; Edwin Ruano 66' 85'		Nicolas Fagundez 17'; Giovanni Molina 91'

February 5, 2019	Sonsonate	0–0	FAS	Sonsonate
7:00pm	Nil		Nil	Stadium: Estadio Ana Mercedes Campos

February 6, 2019	Santa Rosa	2–6	Alianza	Santa Rosa Guachipilin
3:00 pm	Salvador Salguero 61'; Yohalin Palacios 86'		Emerson Mauricio 39' 59'; Bladimir Diaz 13'; Marlon Cornelio 20'; Henry Romero 57'; José Ángel Peña 91'	Stadium: Complejo Municipal Santa Rosa Guachipilin

February 6, 2019	Mar y Plata	0–0	Firpo	Puerto El Triunfo
3:00pm	Nil		Nil	Stadium: Cancha Mar y Plata

February 6, 2019	C.D. Vendaval	0–1	Audaz	Apopa
3:00pm	Nil		Santos López	Stadium: Estadio Joaquin Gutierrez

February 6, 2019	El Vencedor	1–1	Jocoro	Estadio Jose German Rivas
3:00pm	John Machado 27'		Víctor Lugo 30'

February 7, 2019	Jalacatal FC	1–3	Aguila	Quelapa, San Miguel
3:00pm	Andres Hernandez 8'		Bryan Paz 83' 91'; Edwin Lazo 38'	Stadium: Estadio Municipal de Quelapa

==== Second leg ====
February 20, 2019	Santa Tecla	1–0 (1–0 agg.)	Turin	Santa Tecla
16:30	Gerson Mayen 9'		Nil	Stadium: Estadio Las Delicias

February 27, 2019	Jocoro	0–0 (1–1 agg.) (8–7 p)	El Vencedor	Morazán
	Nil		Nil	Stadium: Estadio Correcaminos

March 6, 2019	FAS	2–0 (2–0 agg.)	Sonsonate	Achuapan
15:00 pm	Alvaro Lopez 4'; Oscar Rodas 86'		Nil	Stadium: Estadio Arturo Simeon Magana

March 6, 2019	Aguila	1–0 (4–1 agg.)	Jalacatal	San Miguel
3:10pm	Fredy Espinoza 49'		Nil	Stadium: Estadio Juan Francisco Barraza

March 6, 2019	Alianza	6–0 (12–2 agg.)	Santa Rosa	San Salvador
	Herbert Sosa 18'; Rudy Clavel 22'; Portillo 29'; Bladimir Diaz 68'; Ezequiel Rivas 70' 90'		Nil	Stadium: Estadio Cuscatlan

March 6, 2019	Isidro Metapan	2–2 (4–5 agg.)	Once Lobos	TBD
	Nicolas Munoz 22'; Ricardinho		Ronald Villalta 44'; Luis Figueroa 91'	Stadium: TBD

March 6, 2019	Firpo	0–0 (0–0 agg.) (4–3 p)	Mar y Plata	Usulutan
7:00pm	Nil		Nil	Stadium: Estadio Sergio Torres

March 6, 2019	Audaz	0–1 (1–1 agg.) (5–4 p)	Vendaval	TBD
	Nil		Luis Castillo 70'	Stadium: TBD

== Quarter-final ==
The quarter final draw took place on March 8, 2019 . The first leg took place in the third week of March and the return leg the end of March. Once Lobos from Segunda División (second tier), are the lowest-ranked team still in the competition.

=== Qualified teams ===
Primera Division

- Santa Tecla
- FAS
- Jocoro
- Alianza
- Audaz
- Firpo
- Aguila

Segunda Division

- Once Lobos

Team 1	Agg.	Team 2	1st leg	2nd leg
FAS (1)	1–2	Santa Tecla (1)	0–1	1–1
Alianza (1)	1–4	Once Lobos (2)	2–0	2–1
Jocoro (1)	2–2 (3–2 p)	Aguila (1)	1–2	1–0
Firpo (1)	2–4	Audaz (1)	0–3	1–2

==== First leg ====
March 19, 2019	Alianza	2–0	Once Lobos	San Salvador
	Ezequiel Rivas 4'; Henry Romero 47'		Nil	Stadium: Estadio Cuscatlan

March 19, 2019	FAS	0–1	Santa Tecla	Ahuachapan
	Nil		Jairo Henriquez 28'	Stadium: Estadio Arturo Simeon Magana

March 20, 2019	Jocoro	1–2	Aguila	Jocoro
	TBD 90'		Ricardo Guevara 84'; Andres Quejeda 88'	Stadium: Complejo Tierra de Fuego

March 20, 2019	Firpo	0–3	Audaz	Usulutan
	Nil		Christian Sanchez 22' 43'; Elvin Alvarado 60'	Stadium: Estadio Sergio Torres Rivera

==== Second leg ====
March 21, 2019	Once Lobos	1–2 (1–4 agg.)	Alianza	Chalchuapa, Santa Ana
	Edwin Ruano 37'		Marlon Cornejo 45'; Bladimir Diaz 78'	Stadium: Estadio Once Lobos

March 21, 2019	Santa Tecla	1–1 (1–2 agg.)	FAS	Santa Tecla
	Gilberto Baires 18'		Dustin Corea 78'	Stadium: Estadio Las Delicias

March 22, 2019	Aguila	0–1 (2–2 agg.) (2–3 p)	Jocoro	San Miguel
	Nil		Reinaldo Aparicio 74'	Stadium: Estadio Juan Francisco Barraza

March 22, 2019	Audaz	1–2 (4–2 agg.)	Firpo	San Vicente
	Giovanni Zavaleta 29' (o.g.)		Kevin Perlera 21'; Alonso Umana 83'	Stadium: Estadio Jiboa

== Semi-final ==
The semi final draw took place on TBD, 2019 . The first leg took place in the second week of TBD and the return leg the TBD.

Team 1	Agg.	Team 2	1st leg	2nd leg
Santa Tecla (1)	0–0 (3–1 p)	Alianza(1)	0–0	0–0
Jocoro (1)	1–3	Audaz (1)	2–3	0–1

=== First leg ===
March 25, 2019	Santa Tecla	0–0	Alianza	Santa Tecla
	Nil		Nil	Stadium: Estadio Las Delicias

March 26, 2019	Jocoro	1–2	Audaz	Jocoro, Morazán
	Christian Maciel 64'		Eduardo Rodríguez 17'; Diego Ascencio 38'	Stadium: Complejo Deportivo Tierra de Fuego

=== Second leg ===
March 28, 2019	Audaz	1–0 (3–1 agg.)	Jocoro	San Vicente
	Tardelis Peña 89'		Nil	Stadium: Estadio Jiboa

March 28, 2019	Alianza	0–0 (0–0 agg.) (1–3 p)	Santa Tecla	San Salvador
	Nil		Nil	Stadium: Estadio Cuscatlan

== Final ==
30 April 2019
7:30 pm

Santa Tecla	1-0	Audaz
Geovani Avila 42'		Nil

Estadio Jorge "Mágico" González, San Salvador
Referee: Francisco Quinteros

== Top goalscorers ==
In bold, players that continue active in the competition.

Rank	Player	Club	Goals
1	(El Salvador) Bryan Paz	Aguila	4
2	(El Salvador) Edwin Ruano	Once Lobos	4
3	(El Salvador) Ezequiel Rivas	Alianza	4
4	(Colombia) Jhon Machado	El Vencedor	4
16	(Colombia) Bladimir Diaz	Alianza	3
5	(El Salvador) Christian Sanchez	Audaz	2
5	(El Salvador) Cristian Cisneros	Isidro Metapan	2
6	(El Salvador) Hector Ayala	Juventud Cara Sucia	2
7	(El Salvador) Juan Landaverde	Dulce Nombre de Maria	2
8	(El Salvador) Sergio Calero	UES	2
9	(Panama) Armando Polo	Sonsonate	2
10	(El Salvador) Manfredi Sosa	Jalacatal	2
11	(El Salvador) Wilma Torres	Santa Tecla	2
12	(El Salvador) Rommel Mejía	C.D. Liberal	2
13	(El Salvador) Ricardo Ulloa	Santa Rosa	2
14	(Uruguay) Joaquin Verges	Aguila	2
15	(El Salvador) Emerson Mauricio	Alianza	2
17	(El Salvador) Ronald Villata	Once Lobos	2
18	(Colombia) Luis Castillo	Vendaval	2

== Notes ==
1. FESFUT decided to award the match to Alianza F.C. against Independiente as a 3–0 forfeit win after Independiente failed to register to the Segunda Division
1. FESFUT decided to award the match to Firpo against C.D. Dragon as a 3–0 forfeit win after Dragon failed to register to the Segunda Division
1. Limeno originally won the match 2–1, However it was later found that Kevin Oviedo of Limeno had previously played for another club in the cup, FESFUT declared Mar y Plata 2–0
