= National Institute of Sports of El Salvador =

National Institute of Sports of El Salvador handles around 37 sports disciplines

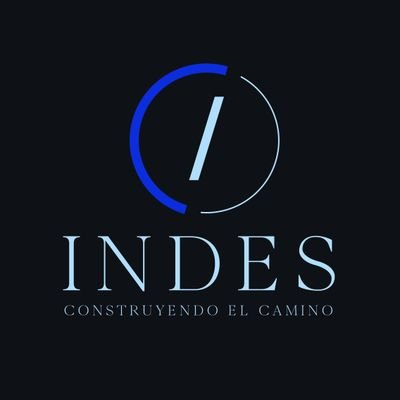
Logo of INDES

The National Institute of Sports of El Salvador (Spanish: Instituto Nacional de los Deportes de El Salvador; INDES), is the entity in charge of managing and promoting sport in El Salvador. It is a government institution but it is decentralized and autonomous. It handles around 37 sports disciplines.

== History ==
INDES was founded 28 June 1980 by Decree 300 of the Revolutionary Government Junta. Its first president, Dr. Joel Arturo Rivas Castillo, assumed his post on 4 July 1980.

Since 2019, Yamil Bukele has been the director of INDES.

== Federations ==
- Archery
- Athletics
- Badminton
- Basketball
- Baseball
- Bodybuilding
- Bowling
- Boxing
- Chess
- Cycling
- Equestrian
- Fencing
- Football
- Gymnastics
- Handball
- Judo
- Karate
- Martial Arts
- Motoring
- Mountaineering
- Motorcycling
- Softball
- Swimming
- Tennis
- Table tennis
- Taekwondo
- Volleyball
- Weightlifting
- Wrestling
