= List of Santa Tecla F.C. records and statistics =

This article lists various statistics related to Santa Tecla Futbol Club.

All stats accurate as of 23 July 2023.

== Honours ==
As of 23 July 2023, Santa Tecla have won 4 Salvadoran Primera División, 1 Segunda Division and 2 Copa El Salvador trophies.

=== Domestic competitions ===
==== League ====
Salvadoran Primera División

  - Champions (4): Clausura 2015, Apertura 2016, Clausura 2017, Apertura 2018

Segunda Division

  - Champions (1): Clausura 2012

==== Cup ====
- Copa El Salvador and predecessors
  - Champions (2) : 2016–17, 2018–19

=== CONCACAF competitions ===
==== Official titles ====
CONCACAF Champions League

- Winners (1): TBD

== Individual awards ==
=== Award winners ===
Top Goalscorer (-)

The following players have won the Goalscorer while playing for Santa Tecla:

- (El Salvador) TBD (-) – Clausura 2004

== Goalscorers ==
- Most goals scored : **80** - Ricardo Ferreira
- Most League goals: **80** - Ricardo Ferreira
- Most League goals in a season: **10** - Ricardo Ferreira, Primera Division, Clausura 2014
- Most goals scored by a Santa Tecla player in a match: **3** - Ricardo Ferreira v. Juventud Independiente (Santa Tecla 3-1 Juventud Independiente), January 2015 and William Maldonado v. UES (Santa Tecla 5-0 UES), 2016
- Most goals scored by a Santa Tecla player in an International match: **1** - Ricardo Ferreira v. C.S.D. Municipal, 25 August 2015, Irvin Herrera v. Real Salt Lake 24 September 2015
- Most goals scored in CONCACAF competition: **2** - Gerson Mayen, 2018 CONCACAF Champions League

=== All-time top goalscorers ===
No.	Player	period	Goals
1	(Brazil) Ricardo Ferreira	2013-2018, 2019-2020	80
2	(El Salvador) Marlon Cornejo	2014-2018, 2021-2022	43
3	(El Salvador) Gerson Mayen	2014-2017, 2018-2019	40
4	(El Salvador) Irvin Herrera	2014-2016, 2021-2022	31
5	(El Salvador) William Maldonado	2011-2017	27
6	(El Salvador) Roberto Gonzalez	2012-2014, 2021-2022	26
7	(El Salvador) Wilma Torres	2016-2020	26
9	(El Salvador) Gilberto Baires	2016-2020, 2022-2023	23
10	(El Salvador) Juan Barahona	2014-2019, 2021	22
8	(El Salvador) Kevin Santamaria	2012–2013, 2018-2019	21
11	(Uruguay) Christian Vaquero	2012-2014	13
12	(Argentina) Facundo Simioli	2011-2014	12
13	(Colombia) Luis Hinestroza	2013-2016	12

Note: Players in bold text are still active with Santa Tecla F.C.

==== Historical goals ====
Goal	Name	Date	Match
1st goal	(El Salvador) TBD	2007	Santa Tecla 1 – TBD 4
1st in Primera Division	(El Salvador) William Manica	15 July 2012	Santa Tecla 2 – Isidro Metapan 2
1st in Concacaf Competition (CONCACAF Champions League)	(El Salvador) Giovanni Zavaleta	August 20, 2015	Santa Tecla 1 – C.S.D. Municipal 1
100th	(El Salvador) William Maldonado	11 August 2014	Santa Tecla 4 - Juventud Independiente 2
500th	(El Salvador) TBD	TBD	TBD
1000th	(Argentina) TBD	TBD	TBD
1500th	(El Salvador) TBD	TBD	TBD
2000th	(El Salvador) TBD	TBD	TBD
2500th	(Uruguay) TBD	TBD	TBD
3000th	(Colombia) TBD	TBD	TBD

== Players ==
=== Appearances ===
Competitive, professional matches only including substitution, number of appearances as a substitute appears in brackets.

Last updated 23 July 2023

	Name	Years	Primera División	Finals	CCL	Total
1	(Mexico) Joel Almeida	2015-2020, 2022-2023	223 (0)	(-)	(-)	(-)
2	(El Salvador) Juan Barahona	2014-2019, 2021	222 (23)	(-)	(-)	(-)
2	(Brazil) Ricardo Ferreira	2013-2018, 2020	207 (89)	(-)	(-)	(-)
3	(El Salvador) Gilberto Baires	2016-2020, 2022-2023	205 (23)	(-)	(-)	(-)
4	(El Salvador) Marlon Cornejo	2014-2018, 2020-2022	198 (43)	(-)	(-)	(-)
5	(El Salvador) Gerson Mayen	2014-2020	180 (40)	(-)	(-)	(-)
6	(El Salvador) Alexander Mendoza	2017-2021	169 (4)	(-)	(-)	(-)
7	(El Salvador) Bryan Tamacas	2014-2018, 2020	153 (8)	(-)	(-)	(-)
8	(El Salvador) Rodrigo Rivera	2018-2021	99 (9)	(-)	(-)	(-)
9	(El Salvador) Cesar Noe Flores	2021-2023	97 (19)	(-)	(-)	(-)
10	(Argentina) Facundo Simioli	2011-2014	83 (-)	(-)	(-)	(-)

==== Other appearances records ====
- Youngest first-team player: 15 years, 336 days – (El Salvador) Rene Fuentes v Atletico Marte, Primera Division, 10 April 2023
- Oldest first-team player: 39 years, 294 days – (Uruguay) Sebastián Abreu v UES, Primera Division, 6 August 2016
- Most appearances in Primera Division: 223 games – (Mexico) Joel Almeida
- Most appearances in International competitions: TBD – (El Salvador) TBD
- Most appearances in CONCACAF competitions: TBD – (El Salvador) TBD
- Most appearances in UNCAF competitions: TBD – (El Salvador) TBD
- Most appearances in CONCACAF Champions League: TBD – (El Salvador) TBD
- Most appearances in UNCAF Copa: TBD (El Salvador) TBD
- Most appearances as a foreign player in all competitions: 223 games – (Mexico) Joel Almeida
- Most appearances as a foreign player in Primera Division: 223 games – (Mexico) Joel Almeida
- Most consecutive League appearances: TBD – (El Salvador) TBD – from Month Day, Year at Month Day, Year
- Shortest appearance: –

== Records ==
=== Scorelines ===
- Record League victory: 8-0 v C.D. Pasaquina, Primera division, 14 February 2016
- Record League Defeat: 1-7 v Alianza F.C., Primera division, 22 July 2012
- Record Cup victory: 6–1 v Escuela de Fútbol de Guazapa, 2017 Copa El Salvador, 22 March 2017
- Record Cup loss: 3-5 v Escuela de Fútbol de Guazapa, 2017 Copa El Salvador, 19 October 2016
- Record CONCACAF Champions League Victory: 2-1 v Seattle Sounders FC, February 22, 2018
- Record CONCACAF Champions League defeat: 0-4 v Seattle Sounders FC, March, 2018
- Record CONCACAF League Victory: 2-1 v Herediano, 8 August 2018
- Record CONCACAF League defeat: 1-0 v Herediano, 2 August 2018

=== Sequences ===
- Most wins in a row: TBD, TBD - TBD
- Most home wins in a row (all competitions): 49 games, April 2017 – 17 February 2019
- Most home league wins in a row: 45 games, April 2017 - 17 February 2019
- Most away wins in a row: TBD, TBD – TBD
- Most draws in a row: TBD, TBD
- Most home draws in a row: TBD, TBD
- Most away draws in a row: TBD, TBD
- Most defeats in a row: 8, TBD
- Most home defeats in a row: TBD, TBD
- Most away defeats in a row: TBD, TBD
- Longest unbeaten run: 18, 2003 Season
- Longest unbeaten run at home: TBD, TBD
- Longest unbeaten run away: TBD, TBD
- Longest winless run: TBD, TBD – TBD
- Longest winless run at home: TBD, TBD – TBD
- Longest winless run away: TBD, TBD - TBD

=== Seasonal ===
- Most goals in all competitions in a season: 48 goals - Apertura 2015
- Most League goals in a season (Apertura/Clausura): 48 goals - Apertura 2015
- Fewest league goals conceded in a season (Apertura/Clausura): 15 goals - Apertura 2018
- Most points in a season (Apertura/Clausura): 47 points - Apertura 2018
- Most League wins in a season (Apertura/Clausura): 12 games – Clausura 2016
- Fewest wins in a season(Apertura/Clausura): 4 games – Apertura 2013
- Most League losses in a season (Apertura/Clausura): 11 Games – Clausura 2022
- Fewest losses in a season(Apertura/Clausura): 3 games - Apertura 2017
- Most home League wins in a season: 7 games – Clausura 2016
- Most away League wins in a season: 4 games – Clausura 2016

=== Internationals ===
- Most international caps (total while at club): 19 - Gerson Mayen - El Salvador

=== Attendances ===
- Highest home attendance: v Isidro Metapan, 4,276 people, December 14, 2014
- Highest away attendance: TBD v TBD, TBD, TBD, TBD
- Highest game attendance in the domestic season: v Isidro Metapan, 6, 152 people, May 24, 2015
- Highest game attendance post season: v Alianza F.C., 29,392 people, December 20, 2016
- Lowest home attendance: v Pasaquina, 114 people, November 25, 2017
- Lowest away attendance: TBD v TBD, TBD, TBD, TBD
- Highest game attendance in International Competition:
- Highest home attendance in International Competition: v Seattle Sounders FC, 7,000 people, February, 2018.
- Lowest home attendance in International Competition: v
- Highest away attendance in International Competition: v Seattle Sounders FC, 35,549 people, March 1, 2018
- Lowest away attendance in International Competition: v

=== Other ===
- TBD
- TBD
- TBD

==== International level ====
- As of 9 August 2023

Opponent	First meeting	Last Meeting	Pld	W	D	L	GF	GA	GD
(Guatemala) Municipal	August 20, 2015	August 25, 2015	2	0	1	1	2	3	-1
(United States) Real Salt Lake	September 15, 2015	September 24, 2015	2	0	1	1	1	2	-1
(United States) Seattle Sounders FC	February, 2018	March 2018	2	1	0	1	2	5	-3
(Costa Rica) Herediano	August 2, 2018	August 2018	2	1	0	1	2	2	0
Totals			0	0	0	0	0	0	0

- Friendly matches not included.
- Games decided by penalty shootout are counted as ties.

== Internationals ==
The following players represented their countries while playing for Santa Tecla (the figure in brackets is the number of caps gained while a Santa Tecla player. The asterisk on the end means they earned their caps while at Santa Tecla. Many of these players also gained caps while at other clubs. Figures for active players (in bold) last updated 2016

El Salvador

- Gerson Mayen (9) *
- William Maldonado (1)*
- Ricardo Ulloa
- Óscar Navarro
- Edwin Sánchez
- Derby Carrillo (11) *
- Francisco Medrano
- Kevin Santamaría (4)
- Ivan Mancia (3) *
- Irving Herrera (2) *
- Juan Barahona (8) *
- Roberto Domínguez (4) *
- Marlón Cornejo (1) *
- Diego Chavarria (1)
- Alexander Mendoza () *
- Gilberto Baires ()*
- Jairo Henríquez ()*
- Bryan Tamacas () *
- Roberto Dominguez ()*
- Wilma Torres ()*

Panama

- Armando Polo

Uruguay

- Sebastián Abreu
- Carlos Bueno
