= 2016–17 Primera División de El Salvador =

Primera División de El Salvador
- Season: 2016–17
- Champions: Santa Tecla F.C. (Apertura); Santa Tecla F.C. (Clausura)
- Relegated: UES
- Champions League: Santa Tecla
- CONCACAF League: Alianza; Águila
- Top goalscorer: TBD (TBD)
- Biggest home win: Águila 5-1 UES (2016)
- Biggest away win: Firpo 0–4 Alianza (2016) C.D. Pasaquina 0–4 Firpo (2016)
- Highest scoring: UES 3–5 Pasaquina (2016)
- Longest winning run: games by: TBD
- Longest unbeaten run: games by: TBD
- Longest winless run: games by: TBD
- Longest losing run: games by: TBD

The 2016–17 Primera División de El Salvador (also known as the Liga Pepsi) was the 18th season and 35th and 36th tournament of El Salvador's Primera División since its establishment of an Apertura and Clausura format. Alianza and Dragón were the defending champions of the Apertura and Clausura, respectively. The league consisted of 12 teams. Two seasons were conducted under identical rules, with each team playing a home and away game against every other club for a total of 22 games per team during the tournament. At the end of each half-season tournament, the top 8 teams in that tournament's regular season standings would take part in the playoffs.

The champions of Apertura or Clausura with the better aggregate record will qualify for the 2018 CONCACAF Champions League. The other champion, and the runner-up with the better aggregate record will qualify for the 2017 CONCACAF League. Should the same team win both tournaments, both runners-up will qualify for CONCACAF League. Should the final of both tournaments features the same 2 teams, the semifinalist with the better aggregate record will qualify for CONCACAF League.

== Teams ==
A total of 12 teams will contest the league, including 11 sides from the 2015–16 Primera División and 1 promoted from the 2015–16 Segunda División.

C.D. Atlético Marte were relegated to 2016–17 Segunda División the previous season.

The relegated team was replaced by the 2015–16 Segunda División playoffs promotion winner. C.D. Municipal Limeño won the Apertura 2015 and Clausura 2016 title, meaning there was no need for a promotion playoff and were promoted automatically.

=== Promotion and relegation ===
Promoted from Segunda División de Fútbol Salvadoreño as of June, 2016.

- Champions: C.D. Municipal Limeño

Relegated to Segunda División de Fútbol Salvadoreño as of June, 2016.

- Last Place: Atlético Marte

== Stadia and locations ==
Location of teams in Apertura 2016/Clausura 2017

Team	Home city	Stadium	Capacity
Águila	San Miguel	Juan Francisco Barraza	10,000
Alianza	San Salvador	Estadio Cuscatlán	53,400
Chalatenango	Chalatenango	Estadio José Gregorio Martínez	15,000
Dragón	San Miguel	Juan Francisco Barraza	10,000
FAS	Santa Ana	Estadio Óscar Quiteño	15,000
Firpo	Usulután	Estadio Sergio Torres	5,000
Isidro Metapán	Metapán	Estadio Jorge Calero Suárez	8,000
Limeño	Santa Rosa de Lima	Estadio Jose Ramon Flores	5,000
Pasaquina	Pasaquina	Estadio San Sebastián	5,000
Santa Tecla ©	Santa Tecla	Estadio Las Delicias	10,000
Sonsonate	Sonsonate	Estadio Anna Mercedes Campos	8,000
UES ⓓ	San Salvador	Estadio Universitario UES	32,000

=== Personnel and sponsoring ===
Team	Chairman	Head Coach	Kitmaker	Shirt sponsor
Águila	(El Salvador) Pedro Arieta	(Argentina) Edgardo Malvestiti	Joma	Tigo, Canal 4, Pollo Campesto
Alianza	(El Salvador) Lisandro Pohl	(El Salvador) Jorge Rodríguez	Lotto	Canal 4, Mister Donut, Tigo, Gatorade, Veca airlines, Brahva
Chalatenango	(El Salvador) Francisco Peraza	(Guatemala) Carlos Mijangos	Milán	Ferreteria Lemus, Alcaldía Municipal de Chalatenango, Canal 4, Agua Fria, Galletas Choco Risas, Funerales la Nueva Proteccion
Dragón	(El Salvador) Roberto Pérez	(Colombia) Henry Vanegas	Milán	Canal 4, L.A. Pizza, credito segguro 4orro
FAS	(El Salvador) Guillermo Morán	(Argentina) Osvaldo Escudero	Milán	Coop-1 de R.L., Pilsener, Tigo, Canal 4
Firpo	(El Salvador) Raúl Galo	(El Salvador) Ramón Sánchez	Galaxia	Dial Fm, Pilsener
Isidro Metapán	(El Salvador) Rafael Morataya	(El Salvador) Edwin Portillo	Milán	Arroz San Pedro, Gumarsal, Don Frijol, Canal 4, Sistema Porcredita
Limeño	(El Salvador) Rómulo Gómez	(Paraguay) Hugo Ovelar	Galaxia	Innova S Sport, Panama Electronic, Royal, Fanny
Pasaquina	(El Salvador) Óscar Ramírez	(El Salvador) Omar Sevilla	Milán	Canal 4, Tigo, Tienda Libre, Farmacias Brasil, ZZpita
Sonsonate	(El Salvador) Pedro Contreras	(Uruguay) Garabet Avedissian	Rush Atletic wear	ProACES, Caja de Crédito de Sonsonate, Alcadia Municipal Sonsonate, Canal 4, Leche salud, Ferreteria Santa Sofia, Coop-1
Santa Tecla	(El Salvador) José Vidal Hernández	(Argentina) Ernesto Corti	Milán	Powerade, DLC, Canal 21, Plaza Merliot, Pollo Indio, Petrox, Claro, Dizucar, Bolívar, Toledo, The Moustache
UES	(El Salvador) Rufino Quezada	(El Salvador) Edgar Henríquez	Galaxia	

== Managerial changes ==
=== Before the start of the season ===
Team	Outgoing manager	Manner of departure	Date of vacancy	Replaced by	Date of appointment	Position in table
Sonsonate	(El Salvador) Mario Elias Guevara	Interim finished	2016	(Peru) Agustín Castillo	2016	7th (Clausura 2015)
FAS	(Argentina) Roberto Gamarra	Resigned	2016	(Argentina) Osvaldo Escudero	2016	th (Clausura 2016)
Chalatenango	(El Salvador) Ricardo Serrano	Contract not extended	2016	(Uruguay) Rubén Alonso	2016	8th (Clausura 2016)
Santa Tecla	(Argentina) Osvaldo Escudero	Resigned, hired as FAS coach	2016	(Argentina) Ernesto Corti	June 2016	1st (Clausura 2016)
Águila	(El Salvador) Juan Ramón Sánchez	Sacked	June 2016	(Argentina) Edgardo Malvestiti	June 2016	1st (Clausura 2016)
Municipal Limeño	(El Salvador) Carlos Romero	Mutual consent	July 2016	(El Salvador) Mauricio Alfaro	July 2016	Newly promoted

=== During the Apertura season ===
Team	Outgoing manager	Manner of departure	Date of vacancy	Replaced by	Date of appointment	Position in table
Alianza	(Argentina) Daniel Fernández	Resigned	August 2016	(El Salvador) Milton Meléndez	August 2016	11th (Apertura 2015)
Firpo	(El Salvador) José Mario Martínez	Sacked	September 2016	(El Salvador) Juan Ramón Sánchez	September 2016	11th (Apertura 2015)
Dragón	(El Salvador) Omar Sevilla	Resigned	September 2016	(El Salvador) Nelson Ancheta	September 2016	12th (Apertura 2015)
Chalatenango	(Uruguay) Rubén Alonso	Resigned	October 2016	(El Salvador) Geovanni Portillo	October 2016	11th (Apertura 2015)
UES	(El Salvador) Edgar Henríquez	Resigned	October 2016	(El Salvador) Horacio Reyes	October 2016	12th (Apertura 2015)
UES	(El Salvador) Horacio Reyes	Interim Finished	October 2016	(El Salvador) Efraín Burgos	October 2016	12th (Apertura 2015)
Municipal Limeño	(El Salvador) Mauricio Alfaro	Resigned (due to family issues)	November 2016	(El Salvador) Francisco Robles	November 2016	9th (Apertura 2015)
Águila	(Argentina) Edgardo Malvestiti	Sacked	November 2016	(Uruguay) Darío Larrosa	November 2016	1st (Apertura 2015)

=== Between Apertura and Clausura seasons ===
Team	Outgoing manager	Manner of departure	Date of vacancy	Replaced by	Date of appointment	Position in table
Pasaquina	(Paraguay) Hugo Ovelar	Resigned	December 2016	(El Salvador) Omar Sevilla	December 2016	8th (Apertura 2016)
Isidro Metapán	(El Salvador) Jorge Rodríguez	Mutual Consent	December 2016	(Argentina) Roberto Gamarra	December 2016	6th (Apertura 2016)
Chalatenango	(El Salvador) Geovanni Portillo	Moved back to assistant coach	December 2016	(Guatemala) Carlos Alberto Mijangos	December 2016	th (Apertura 2016)
Alianza	(El Salvador) Milton Meléndez	Moved back to sports director	December 2016	(El Salvador) Jorge Rodriguez	December 2016	4th and runners up (Apertura 2016)
Águila	(Uruguay) Darío Larrosa	Moved back to sports director	December 2016	(Uruguay) Jorge Daniel Casanova	December 2016	2nd and semi finalist (Apertura 2016)

=== During the Clausura season ===
Team	Outgoing manager	Manner of departure	Date of vacancy	Replaced by	Date of appointment	Position in table
C.D. Chalatenango	(Guatemala) Carlos Alberto Mijangos	Resigned, moved to become a sports director	February 2017	(El Salvador) William Renderos Iraheta	February 2017	10th (Clausura 2016)
Limeño	(El Salvador) Francisco Robles	Sacked	February 2017	(Paraguay) Hugo Ovelar	February 2017	9th (Clausura 2016)
Dragón	(El Salvador) Nelson Mauricio Ancheta	Sacked	February 2017	(El Salvador) Victor Coreas	March 2017	12th (Clausura 2016)
Sonsonate	(Peru) Agustín Castillo	Sacked	February 2017	(El Salvador) Ernesto Góchez Interim	February 2017	th (Clausura 2016)
FAS	(Argentina) Osvaldo Escudero	Resigned	February 2017	(El Salvador) (Argentina) Emiliano Pedrozo	February 2017	10th (Clausura 2016)
Sonsonate	(El Salvador) Ernesto Góchez Interim	Interim Finished	March 2017	(Brazil) Eraldo Correia	March 2017	th (Clausura 2016)
Dragón	(El Salvador) Victor Coreas	Resigned due to player pays	March 2017	(Colombia) Henry Vanegas	March 2017	11th (Clausura 2016)
C.D. Chalatenango	(El Salvador) William Renderos Iraheta	Resigned, moved to become Fitness coach	March 2017	(Guatemala) Carlos Alberto Mijangos	March 2017	10th (Clausura 2016)

== Apertura ==
=== League table ===
Pos	Team	Pld	W	D	L	GF	GA	GD	Pts	Qualification or relegation
1	Sonsonate	22	11	7	4	35	21	+14	40	Quarterfinals
2	Águila	22	10	9	3	25	14	+11	39	Quarterfinals
3	Santa Tecla (C)	22	11	5	6	31	27	+4	38	Quarterfinals
4	Alianza	22	10	6	6	45	27	+18	36	Quarterfinals
5	Municipal Limeno	22	9	7	6	31	29	+2	34	Quarterfinals
6	Isidro Metapán	22	9	6	7	32	26	+6	33	Quarterfinals
7	FAS	22	8	7	7	27	26	+1	31	Quarterfinals
8	Pasaquina	22	8	5	9	28	35	−7	29	Quarterfinals
9	Firpo	22	7	7	8	26	30	−4	28	
10	Chalatenango	22	6	5	11	27	36	−9	23	
11	Dragón	22	2	8	12	19	33	−14	14	
12	UES	22	2	6	14	26	48	−22	12	

Rules for classification: 1) points; 2) goal difference; 3) number of goals scored.
(C) Champions

=== Results ===
Home \ Away	ÁGU	ALI	CHA	DRA	FAS	FIR	MET	LIM	PAS	STE	SON	UES
Águila		2–1	0–1	0–0	2–1	1–1	1–0	1–0	0–0	0–1	0–0	5–1
Alianza	1–2		4–0	4–2	1–2	4–1	1–1	0–1	2–2	4–2	4–1	2–0
Chalatenango	0–2	2–3		3–4	1–1	2–0	1–2	1–2	2–1	1–2	2–2	2–2
Dragón	0–0	0–1	1–2		0–0	0–1	2–1	1–2	0–1	1–2	0–0	1–2
C.D. FAS	0–0	2–2	0–0	2–0		1–0	1–0	1–2	2–1	1–2	0–3	3–1
Firpo	2–2	0–4	1–0	0–0	1–1		0–3	2–3	1–0	1–1	0–1	3–0
Isidro Metapán	1–1	1–1	2–1	1–1	2–1	2–3		1–1	4–1	3–2	3–2	2–0
Limeño	1–2	0–2	2–0	3–2	2–2	0–0	0–0		3–1	1–1	1–1	1–1
Pasaquina	2–1	2–1	3–1	1–1	2–1	0–4	1–2	1–0		2–0	0–2	0–0
Santa Tecla	1–2	1–0	1–0	2–1	2–1	2–2	2–1	3–0	1–1		0–0	2–1
Sonsonate	0–0	2–2	0–1	3–0	1–2	2–1	1–0	4–2	4–1	2–0		1–0
C.D. Universidad de El Salvador	0–1	1–1	3–3	2–2	1–2	1–2	1–2	2–4	3–5	2–1	2–3	

Legend: Blue = home team win; Yellow = draw; Red = away team win.

==== Scoring ====
- First goal of the season: (Argentina) Guillermo Stradella for C.D. FAS against UES, 21 minutes (July 29, 2016)
- First goal by a foreign player: (Argentina) Guillermo Stradella for C.D. FAS against UES, 21 minutes (July 29, 2016)
- Fastest goal in a match: 2 minutes
  - (Colombia) Eder Arias for C.D. Chalatenango against Metapán (August 16, 2016)
- Goal scored at the latest point in a match: 90+1 minutes
  - (El Salvador) Jonathan Águila for C.D. FAS against UES (July 29, 2016)
- First penalty Kick of the season: (Panama) TBD for TBD against TBD, 89 minutes (August 3, 2016)
- Widest winning margin: 4 goals
  - Alianza F.C. 4–0 C.D. Chalatenango (, 2016)
  - Águila 5-1 UES (, 2016)
- First hat-trick of the season: (Jamaica) Ricardo Brown for Metapán against C.D. Pasaquina (September 28, 2016)
- First own goal of the season: (El Salvador) Kevin Carabantes (C.D. Chalatenango) for A.D. Isidro Metapán (August 16, 2016)
- Most goals in a match: 7 goals
  - C.D. Chalatenango 3–4 C.D. Dragón (September 28, 2016)
- Most goals by one team in a match: 5 goals
  - Águila 5-1 UES (, 2016)
- Most goals in one half by one team: 4 goals
  - TBD 5–2(1–2) TBD (2nd half, September 30, 2016)
- Most goals scored by losing team: 3 goals
  - C.D. Chalatenango 3–4 C.D. Dragón (September 28, 2016)
- Most goals by one player in a single match: 3 goals
  - (Jamaica) Ricardo Brown for Metapán against C.D. Pasaquina (September 17, 2016)
  - (Paraguay) Gustavo Guerreño for Pasaquina against C.D. Universidad de El Salvador (September 2016)
  - (El Salvador) (Honduras) Williams Reyes for Firpo against C.D. Pasaquina (October 9, 2016)
  - (Uruguay) Sebastián Abreu for Santa Tecla F.C. against C.D. Águila (December 7, 2016)

==== Club ====
- Most clean sheets: C.D. Águila
  - 11
- Fewest clean sheets: UES
  - 1
- Best Home record during the Apertura season: Sonsonate
  - 23 out of 33 points (7 wins, 2 draws, and 2 loss)
- Worst Home record during the Apertura season: Dragón and UES
  - 6 out of 33 points (1 win, 3 draws, and 7 losses)
- Best Away record during the Apertura season: Águila
  - 20 out of 33 points (5 wins, 5 draws, and 1 losses)
- Worst Away record during the Apertura season: UES
  - 6 out of 33 points (1 win, 3 draws, and 7 losses)
- Highest scoring team: Alianza
  - 45 goals
- Lowest scoring team: UES
  - 48 goals

=== Top goalscorers ===
Rank	Player	Team	Goals
1	(Colombia) Jefferson Viveros	Limeño	13
2	(Uruguay) Rodrigo Cubilla	Chalatenango	11
3	(El Salvador) David Díaz	UES	10
3	(Colombia) Oscar Guerrero	Alianza	10
4	(Paraguay) Gustavo Guerreño	Pasaquina	9
5	(Uruguay) Sebastián Abreu	Santa Tecla	8
5	(Jamaica) Mckauley Tulloch	UES	8
6	(El Salvador) Juan Carlos Portillo	Alianza	7
9	(Jamaica) Ricardo Brown	Isidro Metapán	8
9	(El Salvador) Marlón Cornejo	Santa Tecla	6

=== Top assists ===
Rank	Player	Nation	Club	Assists
1	Yuvini Salamanca	SLV	Limeño	13
2	Óscar Cerén	SLV	Alianza	8

=== Individual awards ===
Hombre GOL	Best Coach Award	Best Goalkeeper Award	Fair Player Award	Rookie Player Award
(Colombia) Jefferson Viveros; Limeño	(Peru) Agustín Castillo; Sonsonate	(El Salvador) Benji Villalobos; Águila	(El Salvador) Óscar Cerén; Alianza	(El Salvador) Josué Santos; FAS

=== Playoffs ===
Quarterfinals
6	Isidro Metapán	2	0	2
3	Santa Tecla	2	1	3
7	FAS	1	0	1
2	Águila	1	2	3
5	Limeno	1	1	2
4	Alianza	2	0	2
8	Pasaquina	2	0	2
1	C.D. Sonsonate	1	1	2

Semifinals
TBD	Santa Tecla	4	0	4
TBD	Águila	1	2	3
TBD	Alianza F.C.	0	4	4
TBD	C.D. Sonsonate	0	0	0

Finals
TBD	Santa Tecla	3
TBD	Alianza F.C.	2

==== Quarterfinals ====
Team 1	Agg.	Team 2	1st leg	2nd leg
Pasaquina	2–2 (s)	Sonsonate	2–1	1–0
FAS	1–3	Águila	1–1	2–0
Isidro Metapán	2–3	Santa Tecla	2–2	1–0
Alianza	2–2 (s)	Limeño	1–2	0–1

1. ^{†} Order of legs reversed.

===== First leg =====
November 30, 2016
15:00 UTC−6

Pasaquina	2–1	Sonsonate
Kevin Sagastizado 50'; Miguel Solís 81'		Ricardo Ulloa 4'

Estadio San Sebastián, Pasaquina
Referee: Elmer Martínez

November 30, 2016
19:00 UTC−6

FAS	1–1	Águila
Jairo Henríquez 50'		Álvaro Lizama 87'

Estadio Óscar Quiteño, Santa Ana
Referee: Joel Aguilar Chicas

December 1, 2016
15:00 UTC−6

Limeño	1-2	Alianza
Christopher Galeas 37'		Herbert Sosa 66' (pen.); Alexander Larín 75'

Estadio Jose Ramon Flores, Santa Rosa de Lima

December 1, 2016
19:00 UTC−6

Isidro Metapán	2-2	Santa Tecla
Romeo Parkes 56'; Josué Flores 98'		Gerson Mayen 18'; Marlón Cornejo 92'

Estadio Jorge Calero Suárez, Metapán

===== Second leg =====
December 3, 2016
15:00 UTC−6

Sonsonate	1–0	Pasaquina
Paolo Suárez 11'

Estadio Anna Mercedes Campos, Sonsonate

2–2. Sonsonate advanced as the higher seeded team.

December 3, 2016
19:00 UTC−6

Águila	2–0	FAS
Henry Romero 36'; Nicolás Fagúndez 58'

Estadio Jose Ramon Flores, Santa Rosa de Lima

Águila won 3–1 on aggregate.

December 1, 2016
15:00 UTC−6

Alianza	0-1	Limeño
		Carlos Del Giorno 93'

Estadio Cuscatlán, San Salvador

2–2. Alianza advanced as the higher seeded team.

December 1, 2016
19:00 UTC−6

Santa Tecla	1–0	Isidro Metapán
Gerson Mayen 20'

Estadio Las Delicias, Santa Tecla

Santa Tecla won 3–2 on aggregate.

==== Semifinals ====
Team 1	Agg.	Team 2	1st leg	2nd leg
Sonsonate	0–0	Alianza	0–0	0–4
Águila	3–4	Santa Tecla	4–1	2–0

===== First leg =====
December 7, 2016
19:00 UTC−6

Alianza	0–0	Sonsonate

Estadio Cuscatlán, San Salvador
Referee: Ismael Cornejo

December 7, 2016
19:30 UTC−6

Santa Tecla	4–1	Águila
Marlón Cornejo 56'; Sebastián Abreu 16' 32' 64'		Jimmy Valoyes 18'

Estadio Las Delicias, Santa Tecla
Referee: Germán Martínez

===== Second leg =====
December 11, 2016
18:00 UTC−6

Sonsonate	0–4	Alianza
		Rodolfo Zelaya 22' 65' (pen.) 84'; Alexander Larín 51'

Alianza won 4–0 on aggregate.

December 11, 2016
19:30 UTC−6

Águila	2–0	Santa Tecla
Jimmy Valoyes 8'; Ignacio Flores 63'

Santa Tecla won 4–3 on aggregate.

==== Final ====
December 18, 2016
15:00 UTC−6

Alianza	2–3	Santa Tecla
Alexander Larín 49'; Rodolfo Zelaya 55'		Gerson Mayen 47'; Sebastián Abreu 78' 91'

Estadio Cuscatlán, San Salvador
Attendance: 29,138
Referee: Joel Antonio Aguilar Chicas

Alianza F.C.
GK	25	(El Salvador) Óscar Arroyo
DF	5	(El Salvador) Andrés Flores Jaco
DF	6	(El Salvador) Mario Jacobo
DF	4	(Uruguay) Fabricio Silva
DF	15	(El Salvador) Danny Torres
MF	7	(El Salvador) Rudy Valencia	(yellow card) 60'
MF	8	(El Salvador) Óscar Cerén
MF	42	(El Salvador) Alexander Larín 49'
MF	11	(El Salvador) Juan Carlos Portillo	(yellow card) 37'	(substituted off) 60'
MF	3	(El Salvador) Herbert Sosa	(substituted off) 76'
FW	22	(El Salvador) Rodolfo Zelaya 55'
Substitutes:
FW	9	(El Salvador) Rodrigo Rivera	(yellow card) 77'	(substituted on) 60'
FW	10	(Colombia) Oscar Guerrero	(substituted on) 76'
Manager:
(El Salvador) Milton Meléndez

Santa Tecla F.C.
GK	1	(Mexico) Joel Almeida
DF	3	(El Salvador) Bryan Tamacas
DF	12	(El Salvador) Roberto Domínguez
DF	26	(El Salvador) Ivan Mancia
DF	6	(El Salvador) Juan Barahona	(yellow card) 48'
MF	7	(El Salvador) Kevin Ayala
MF	5	(El Salvador) Diego Chavarría	(substituted off) 76'
MF	8	(El Salvador) Gerson Mayen	(yellow card) 47' (goal) 47'
MF	57	(El Salvador) Marlón Cornejo	(yellow card) 38'
FW	9	(El Salvador) William Maldonado	(substituted off) 59'
FW	15	(Uruguay) Sebastián Abreu	(yellow card) 47' (goal) 78' 91'
Substitutes:
FW	11	(El Salvador) Léster Blanco		(substituted on) 59'
MF	25	(Uruguay) Sergio Souza		(substituted on) 76'
Manager:
(Argentina) Ernesto Corti

Apertura 2016 champions

2nd title

== Clausura ==
=== League table ===
Pos	Team	Pld	W	D	L	GF	GA	GD	Pts	Qualification or relegation
1	Alianza	22	13	5	4	38	21	+17	44	Quarterfinals
2	Águila	22	9	10	3	25	14	+11	37	Quarterfinals
3	Santa Tecla	22	9	7	6	36	27	+9	34	Quarterfinals
4	Isidro Metapán	22	9	7	6	28	21	+7	34	Quarterfinals
5	Firpo	22	8	7	7	34	36	−2	31	Quarterfinals
6	FAS	22	7	10	5	21	23	−2	31	Quarterfinals
7	Municipal Limeno	22	7	6	9	26	32	−6	27	Quarterfinals
8	Pasaquina	22	6	8	8	24	23	+1	26	Quarterfinals
9	UES	22	6	8	8	28	32	−4	26	
10	Dragón	22	7	4	11	24	30	−6	25	
11	Sonsonate	22	6	3	13	24	36	−12	21	
12	Chalatenango	22	5	5	12	26	39	−13	20	

Rules for classification: 1) points; 2) goal difference; 3) number of goals scored.

=== Results ===
Home \ Away	ÁGU	ALI	CHA	DRA	FAS	FIR	MET	LIM	PAS	STE	SON	UES
Águila		0–0	3–1	0–1	0–0	5–2	1–1	1–2	1–1	1–1	2–0	3–2
Alianza	0–1		2–0	3–1	3–1	1–0	0–0	5–2	1–0	0–2	2–1	2–0
Chalatenango	0–0	1–3		1–0	2–2	2–3	1–2	2–0	1–1	2–1	1–0	1–1
Dragón	0–2	2–3	2–1		1–1	1–2	2–1	0–0	2–2	0–3	2–2	2–0
C.D. FAS	0–0	1–0	1–0	2–1		1–2	0–3	1–0	1–0	0–2	0–1	2–2
Firpo	0–0	1–1	3–1	0–1	1–1		1–3	0–0	3–2	1–1	2–2	4–2
Isidro Metapán	0–1	3–1	0–1	1–0	0–1	0–1		1–0	1–1	1–0	1–2	0–0
Limeño	2–0	0–2	4–1	0–3	1–1	0–3	3–3		3–0	3–1	1–0	0–3
Pasaquina	1–1	1–1	2–1	1–0	0–0	3–0	1–1	0–1		4–1	2–1	2–0
Santa Tecla	0–0	0–2	4–2	0–1	3–3	5–2	0–0	2–2	1–0		2–0	0–0
Sonsonate	0–2	2–4	3–2	2–0	0–1	2–2	2–3	2–1	1–0	1–4		0–1
C.D. Universidad de El Salvador	0–1	2–2	2–2	3–2	1–1	2–1	2–3	1–1	1–0	2–3	1–0	

Legend: Blue = home team win; Yellow = draw; Red = away team win.

==== Scoring ====
- First goal of the season: (El Salvador) Erick Villalobos for C.D. Pasaquina against Alianza, 35 minutes (January 14, 2017)
- First goal by a foreign player: (Uruguay) Darío Ferreira for Alianza F.C. against Pasaquina, 57 minutes (January 14, 2017)
- Fastest goal in a match: 1 minutes
  - (El Salvador) Miguel Lemus for Firpo against C.D. Municipal Limeno (2017)
- Goal scored at the latest point in a match: 90+1 minutes
  - (El Salvador) TBD for TBD against TBD (2017)
- First penalty Kick of the season: (Uruguay) Danilo Peinado for C.D. Águila against Firpo, 81 minutes (15 January 2017)
- Widest winning margin: 3 goals
  - C.D. Aguila 5-2 Firpo (15 January 2017)
- First hat-trick of the season: ** (El Salvador) Rodolfo Zelaya for Alianza against Dragon (2 April 2017)
- First own goal of the season: (El Salvador) Bladimir Osorio (C.D. Dragon) for UES ( 2017)
- Most goals in a match: 7 goals
  - C.D. Águila 5-2 Firpo (15 January 2017)
- Most goals by one team in a match: 5 goals
  - C.D. Águila 5-2 Firpo (15 January 2017)
- Most goals in one half by one team: 3 goals
  - C.D. Águila 3–0 (5–2) Firpo (1st half, 2017)
- Most goals scored by losing team: TBD goals
  - TBD 3–4 TBD ( 2017)
- Most goals by one player in a single match: 3 goals
  - (El Salvador) Rodolfo Zelaya for Alianza against Dragon (2 April 2017)
  - (Colombia) Oscar Movil for Limeno against TBD ( April, 2017)

=== Individual awards ===
Hombre GOL	Best Coach Award	Best Goalkeeper Award	Fair Player Award	Rookie Player Award
(Paraguay) Javier Lezcano; Pasaquina	(El Salvador) Jorge Rodriguez; Alianza	(El Salvador) Benji Villalobos; Águila	(El Salvador) Wilma Torres; Firpo	(El Salvador) Gerardo Guirola; Isidro Metapan

=== Playoffs ===
Quarterfinals
6	FAS	0	0	0
3	Santa Tecla	0	1	1
7	Limeno	1	0	1
2	Águila	1	0	0
5	Firpo	2	0	2
4	Isidro Metapán	1	1	2
8	Pasaquina	0	0	0
1	Alianza F.C.	1	3	4

Semifinals
TBD	Santa Tecla	2	3	5
TBD	Águila	0	2	2
TBD	Isidro Metapán	0	0	0
TBD	Alianza	0	2	2

Finals
TBD	Santa Tecla	4
TBD	Alianza	0

==== Quarterfinals ====
Team 1	Agg.	Team 2	1st leg	2nd leg
Pasaquina	0-4	Alianza	0-1	3–0
Limeño	3–3 (s)	Águila	1–1	2–2
FAS	0–1	Santa Tecla	0–0	1–0
Firpo	2–2 (s)	Isidro Metapán	2–1	1-0

1. ^{†} Order of legs reversed.

===== First leg =====
November 30, 2017
15:00 UTC−6

Pasaquina	0-1	Alianza
		Rodolfo Zelaya 68'

Estadio Cuscatlán, San Salvador

November 30, 2016
19:00 UTC−6

Limeño	1–1	Águila
Carlos del Giorno 44'		Ortíz 38'

Estadio Jose Ramon Flores, Santa Rosa de Lima
Referee: Joel Aguilar Chicas

December 1, 2016
15:00 UTC−6

FAS	0-0	Santa Tecla

Estadio Óscar Quiteño, Santa Ana

December 1, 2016
19:00 UTC−6

Firpo	2-1	Isidro Metapán
Cesar Gonzales 45'; Pierre Pluchino 76'		Romeo Parkes 91'

===== Second leg =====
May 7, 2017

Alianza	3-0	Pasaquina
Issac Portillo 26'; Alexander Larin 38'; Portillo 83'		None

Estadio Cuscatlán, San Salvador

Alianza won 4–0 on aggregate.

May 7, 2017
19:00 UTC−6

Águila	2-2	Limeño
Irvin Valdez 25'; James Cabezas 47'		Óscar Móvil 76'; 90'

3–3. Aguila advanced as the higher seeded team.

May 6, 2017
15:00 UTC−6

Santa Tecla	1-0	FAS
William Canales 93'

Estadio Las Delicias, Santa Tecla

Santa Tecla won 1–0 on aggregate.

May 6, 2017
19:00 UTC−6

Isidro Metapán	1–0	Firpo
Josué Flores 20'

2–2. Isidro Metapan advanced as the higher seeded team.

==== Semifinals ====
Team 1	Agg.	Team 2	1st leg	2nd leg
Alianza	2–0	Isidro Metapan	0–0	2–0
Águila	2–5	Santa Tecla	2–0	2–3

===== First leg =====
December 7, 2016
19:00 UTC−6

Isidro Metapan	0–0	Alianza

December 7, 2016
19:30 UTC−6

Santa Tecla	2-0	Águila
Juan Barahona 22'; Gerson Mayen 28'

Estadio Las Delicias, Santa Tecla

===== Second leg =====
May 14, 2017
18:00 UTC−6

Alianza	2-0	Isidro Metapan
None		Rodolfo Zelaya 9'; Alexander Larín 13'

Alianza won 2–0 on aggregate.

May 14, 2017
19:30 UTC−6

Águila	2–3	Santa Tecla
Alvaro Lizama 4'; James Cabezas 66'		Ricardinho 11'; Marlon Cornejo 74'; William Canales

Santa Tecla won 5–2 on aggregate.

==== Final ====
May 21, 2017

Santa Tecla	4-0	Alianza
Marlon Cornejo 36'; Gerson Mayen 46'; William Canales 83'; Carlos Bueno 90'		None

Estadio Cuscatlán, San Salvador
Attendance: 29, 392
Referee: Marlon Mejia

Santa Tecla F.C.
GK	1	(Mexico) Joel Almeida
DF	3	(El Salvador) Bryan Tamacas
DF	26	(El Salvador) Ivan Mancia	(yellow card) 15'
DF	12	(El Salvador) Roberto Domínguez	(yellow card) 33'
DF	6	(El Salvador) Juan Barahona	(yellow card) 44'
MF	7	(El Salvador) Marlón Cornejo	36' (yellow card) 85'
MF	5	(El Salvador) Kevin Ayala	(yellow card) 46' (substituted off) 79'
MF	8	(El Salvador) Aldair Rivera
MF	57	(El Salvador) Gilberto Baires	(substituted off) 86'
FW	9	(El Salvador) Gerson Mayen	46'
FW	15	(Brazil) Ricardinho	(substituted off) 70'
Substitutes:
MF	25	(Uruguay) Carlos Bueno		90' (substituted on) 70'
MF	25	(El Salvador) William Canales		83' (substituted on) 79'
FW	11	(El Salvador) Diego Chavarría		(substituted on) 86'
Manager:
(Argentina) Ernesto Corti

Alianza F.C.
GK	25	(El Salvador) Óscar Arroyo	(yellow card) 46'
DF	5	(El Salvador) Andrés Flores Jaco	(yellow card) 65'
DF	6	(El Salvador) Mario Jacobo
DF	4	(Uruguay) Dario Ferreira	91
DF	15	(El Salvador) Danny Torres
MF	7	(El Salvador) Alexander Larín
MF	8	(El Salvador) Óscar Cerén	(yellow card) 46'	(substituted off) 61'
MF	42	(El Salvador) Rudy Valencia
MF	11	(El Salvador) Rodrigo Rivera	(substituted off) 46'
MF	3	(Colombia) Luis Hinestroza	(substituted off) 76'
FW	22	(El Salvador) Rodolfo Zelaya	91
Substitutes:
FW	9	(El Salvador) Herbert Sosa	(substituted on) 46'
FW	10	(El Salvador) Juan Carlos Portillo	(substituted on) 76'
FW	10	(Paraguay) Gustavo Guerreno	(substituted on) 76'
Manager:
(El Salvador) Jorge Rodriguez

Clausura 2017 champions

3rd title

== List of foreign players in the league ==
This is a list of foreign players in the 2016–17 season. The following players:

1. Have played at least one game for the respective club.
2. Have not been capped for the El Salvador national football team on any level, independently from the birthplace

A new rule was introduced this season, that clubs can have four foreign players per club and can only add a new player if there is an injury or a player/s is released and its before the close of the season transfer window.

Águila

- (Colombia) Jimmy Valoyes
- (Colombia) James Cabezas
- (Uruguay) Ignacio Flores
- (Uruguay) Nicolás Fagúndez
- (Uruguay) Danilo Peinado
- (Argentina) Adrián Colazo

Alianza

- (Colombia) Iván Garrido
- (Colombia) Oscar Guerrero
- (Colombia) Luis Hinestroza
- (Uruguay) Fabricio Silva
- (Uruguay) Wálter Vázquez
- (Paraguay) Gustavo Guerreño
- (Uruguay) Darío Ferreira

Chalatenango

- (Colombia) Bladimir Díaz
- (Colombia) Eder Arias
- (Uruguay) Rodrigo Cubilla
- (Colombia) Mauricio Mendoza
- (Colombia) Carlos Angulo

Dragón

- (Argentina) Álvaro Bely
- (Jamaica) Kenroy Howell
- (Trinidad and Tobago) Jamal Jack
- (Colombia) Luis Valencia
- (Brazil) Josielson Moraes
- (Honduras) Marcio Ayala
- (Honduras) Georgie Welcome
- (Brazil) Jackson de Oliveira

FAS

- (Argentina) Guillermo Stradella
- (Argentina) Juan Aimar
- (Argentina) Facundo Martínez
- (Argentina) Facundo Simioli
- (Argentina) Matías Coloca
- (Argentina) Allan Muraldo
- (Argentina) Sandro Medaglia

Firpo

- (Colombia) Jhony Rios
- (Argentina) Allan Murialdo
- (Argentina) Maximiliano Morales Roldán
- (Argentina) Joel Perucci
- (Venezuela) César Iván González
- (Venezuela) Pierre Alexandre Pluchino Galuppo
- (Brazil) Thiago Monteiro Accioli Da Silva

Isidro Metapán

- (Ecuador) Henry Rúa
- (Jamaica) Romeo Parkes
- (Jamaica) Ricardo Brown
- (Jamaica) Akeem Priestley
- (Argentina) Alexis Ramos
- (Cameroon) Ayukokata Ndip

Limeño

- (Argentina) Carlos Del Giorno
- (Colombia) Jefferson Viveros
- (Honduras) Clayvin Zúñiga
- (Uruguay) Jesús Toscanini
- (Honduras) Julio César de León
- (Honduras) Aly Arriola
- (Colombia) Óscar Móvil

Pasaquina

- (Paraguay) Julián Chávez Ruíz
- (Paraguay) Gustavo Guerreño
- (Paraguay) Javier Lezcano
- (Paraguay) Andrés Britez
- (Honduras) Arlie Bernárdez
- (Trinidad and Tobago) Dwane James

Sonsonate

- (Brazil) Zé Paulo
- (Colombia) Carlos Hidalgo
- (Brazil) Jackson de Oliveira
- (Brazil) Elenilson Ferreira García
- (Brazil) Josimar Moreira
- (Costa Rica) Yosimar Arias
- (Costa Rica) Johan Condega

Santa Tecla

- (Brazil) Ricardinho
- (Mexico) Joel Almeida
- (Uruguay) Sebastián Abreu
- (Brazil) Oswaldo Alves Da Silva
- (Uruguay) Sergio Souza
- (Uruguay) Carlos Bueno

UES

- (Colombia) William Guerrero
- (Jamaica) Mckauly Tulloch
- (Brazil) Elison dos Santos
- (Trinidad and Tobago) Weslie John
- (Argentina) Diego González
- (Colombia) Cristian Gil Mosquera
- (Venezuela) Rafael Ponzo
- (Argentina) Lucas Rivero

(player released during the Apertura season) (player released between the Apertura and Clausura seasons) (player released during the Clausura season)

== Aggregate table ==
Pos	Team	Pld	W	D	L	GF	GA	GD	Pts	Qualification or relegation
1	Alianza	44	23	11	10	83	48	+35	80	CONCACAF League (Note: As Apertura and Clausura runners-up)
2	Águila	44	19	19	6	50	28	+22	76	CONCACAF League (Note: As non-finalists with best aggregate)
3	Santa Tecla	44	20	12	12	67	54	+13	72	CONCACAF Champions League (Note: As Apertura and Clausura champions)
4	Isidro Metapán	44	18	13	13	60	47	+13	67	
5	FAS	44	15	17	12	48	49	−1	62	
6	Sonsonate	44	17	10	17	59	57	+2	61	
7	Municipal Limeno	44	16	13	15	57	61	−4	61	
8	Firpo	44	15	14	15	60	66	−6	59	
9	Pasaquina	44	14	13	17	52	58	−6	55	
10	Chalatenango	44	11	10	23	53	75	−22	43	
11	Dragón	44	9	12	23	43	63	−20	39	
12	UES	44	8	14	22	54	80	−26	38	Segunda División

Source: primerafutboles.com
Rules for classification: 1) points; 2) goal difference; 3) number of goals scored.
