= 2021–22 Primera División de El Salvador =

Primera División tournament

Primera División de El Salvador
- Season: 2021–22
- Dates: 31 July 2021 – 18 December 2021 (Apertura), 2022 – 29 May 2022 (Clausura)
- Champions: Alianza (Apertura 2021); Alianza/Aguila (Clausura 2022)
- Relegated: Municipal Limeno
- 2022 CONCACAF League: Alianza FC
- 2022 CONCACAF League: Aguila
- 2022 CONCACAF League: C.D. Platense Municipal Zacatecoluca
- Matches: 72
- Goals: 206 (2.86 per match)
- Top goalscorer: Duvier Riascos (16 goals Apertura 2021); Bladimir Diaz (9 goals Clausura 2022)
- All statistics correct as of 18 April 2022.

The 2021–22 Primera División de El Salvador, also known as the Liga Pepsi, was the 23rd season and 45th and 46th Primera División tournament, El Salvador's top football division, since its establishment of an Apertura and Clausura format. Alianza and FAS are the defending champions of both Apertura and Clausura tournaments respectively. The league will consist of 12 teams. There will be two seasons conducted under identical rules, with each team playing a home and away game against the other clubs for a total of 22 games per tournament. At the end of each half season tournament, the top six teams in that tournament's regular season standings will take part in the playoffs.

The champions of Apertura or Clausura with the better aggregate record will qualify for the 2023 CONCACAF Champions League. The other champion, and the runner-up with the better aggregate record will qualify for the 2022 CONCACAF League. Should the same team win both tournaments, both runners-up will qualify for CONCACAF League. Should the final of both tournaments features the same two teams, the semi-finalist with the better aggregate record will qualify for CONCACAF League.

== Teams ==
=== Promotion and relegation ===
A total of 12 teams will contest the league, including 11 sides from the 2020–21 Primera División and 1 promoted from the 2020–21 Segunda División.

C.D. Platense Municipal Zacatecoluca was promoted to the Primera División in June 2021 after defeating Real Destroyer in a playoff match by a score of 2–1.

C.D. Sonsonate was relegated to the 2021–22 Segunda División.

=== Stadiums and locations ===
Location of teams in 2021–2022 Primera División de El Salvador

Team	Location	Stadium	Capacity
A.D. Chalatenango	Chalatenango	Estadio José Gregorio Martínez	15,000
A.D. Isidro Metapán	Metapán	Estadio Jorge Calero Suárez	10,000
Alianza F.C.	San Salvador	Estadio Cuscatlán	53,400
C.D. Águila	San Miguel	Estadio Juan Francisco Barraza	10,000
C.D. Atlético Marte	San Salvador	Estadio Cuscatlán	53,400
C.D. FAS	Santa Ana	Estadio Óscar Quiteño	17,500
C.D. Luis Ángel Firpo	Usulután	Estadio Sergio Torres	5,000
C.D. Platense Municipal Zacatecoluca	Zacatecoluca	Estadio Antonio Toledo Valle	10,000
C.D. Municipal Limeño	Santa Rosa de Lima	Estadio José Ramón Flores Berridos	5,000
Once Deportivo	Ahuachapán	Estadio Simeón Magaña	5,000
Jocoro F.C.	Jocoro	Complejo Deportivo Tierra de Fuego	3,000
Santa Tecla F.C.	Santa Tecla	Estadio Las Delicias	10,000

== Notable events ==
=== Notable deaths from Clausura 2021 season and 2022 Apertura season ===
The following people associated with the Primera Division died between the middle of 2021 and middle of 2022.

- Zizinho (Brazilian, ex FAS player)
- Oscar Montes (ex ADET player)
- Luis Angel Leon (ex ADET coach)
- Raul "Cayito" Mejia (ex Santa Anita, Atlante and Atlético Marte player)
- Edgar 'Pata Gorda' Morales (ex Alianza and Atlético Marte player)
- Conrado Miranda (ex Aguila, Atletico Marte player and Aguila, Atletico Marte, Queisqepue, Cojutepeque, Tiburones, Alianza coach)
- Hector Cedros (Uruguayan, ex FAS player)
- Hector Edmundo Valdiviseo (ex ADET, CESSA, Cojutepeque and Firpo player)
- Julio Cesar Oliva (ex Aguila player)
- Henrique Pasaquiri (Brazilian, ex FAS player)
- Ramon Zumbado (ex Atletico Marte player)
- Nahún Corro Bazan (Mexican, Ex Aguila player)

== Managerial changes ==
=== Before the start of the season ===
Team	Outgoing manager	Manner of departure	Date of vacancy	Replaced by	Date of appointment
Jocoro	(El Salvador) Carlos Romero	Contract finished	8 May 2021	(Uruguay) Pablo Quiñónez	22 May 2021
Águila	(Colombia) Armando Osma Rueda	Contract finished	9 May 2021	(Argentina) Cristian Domizi	13 May 2021
Atlético Marte	(Argentina) Cristian Domizi	Contract finished	12 May 2021	(El Salvador) Nelson Mauricio Ancheta	2 June 2021
Municipal Limeño	(El Salvador) Nelson Mauricio Ancheta	Sacked	15 May 2021	(Mexico) Bruno Martínez	16 May 2021
Once Municipal	(El Salvador) Mario Elias Guevara	Returned back to assistant coach	May 2021	(El Salvador) Carlos Romero	18 May 2021

=== During the Apertura season ===
Team	Outgoing manager	Manner of departure	Date of vacancy	Replaced by	Date of appointment	Pos. in table
Isidro Metapán	(Spain) Juan Cortés	Sacked	16 August 2021	(El Salvador) Misael Alfaro	16 August 2021	10th
Jocoro	(Uruguay) Pablo Quiñónez	Sacked	25 August 2021	(El Salvador) Víctor Coreas	26 August 2021	10th
Municipal Limeño	(Mexico) Bruno Martínez	Sacked	26 August 2021	(El Salvador) José Manuel Romero	26 August 2021	10th
Chalatenango	(Costa Rica) Ricardo Montoya	Sacked	14 September 2021	(El Salvador) Ricardo Serrano (interim)	14 September 2021	10th
Chalatenango	(El Salvador) Ricardo Serrano	Returned back to assistant coach	16 September 2021	(El Salvador) Erick Dowson Prado	16 September 2021	10th
Santa Tecla	(Uruguay) Rubén da Silva	Resigned	27 September 2021	(El Salvador) Rodolfo Góchez (interim)	29 September 2021	10th
Municipal Limeño	(El Salvador) José Manuel Romero	Resigned	29 September 2021	(El Salvador) Giovanni Trigueros	29 September 2021	12th
Águila	(Argentina) Cristian Domizzi	Sacked	2 October 2021	(Peru) Agustín Castillo	5 October 2021	6th
Isidro Metapán	(El Salvador) Misael Alfaro	Sacked	4 October 2021	(El Salvador) Omar Mejía (interim)	4 October 2021	10th
Once Deportivo	(El Salvador) Carlos Romero	Resigned	30 October 2021	(El Salvador) Mario Elías Guevara (interim)	30 October 2021	5th
Municipal Limeño	(El Salvador) Giovanni Trigueros	Resigned	24 November 2021	(El Salvador) José Manuel Romero	24 November 2021	12th

=== Between the Apertura and Clausura season ===
Team	Outgoing manager	Manner of departure	Date of vacancy	Replaced by	Date of appointment	Pos. in table
Municipal Limeño	(El Salvador) José Manuel Romero	Intermship finished	December 2021	(El Salvador) Carlos Romero	December 2021	12th
Santa Tecla F.C.	(El Salvador) Rodolfo Gochez	Intermship finished	December 2021	(Uruguay) Daniel Bartolotta	December 2021	12th
Once Deportivo de Ahuachapan	(El Salvador) Mario Elias Guevara	Intermship finished	December 2021	(Uruguay) Ruben da Silva	December 2021	th
Jocoro	(El Salvador) Victor Coreas	Sacked	December 2021	(El Salvador) Edgar Henriquez	January 2022	10th

=== Clausura seasons ===
Team	Outgoing manager	Manner of departure	Date of vacancy	Replaced by	Date of appointment	Position in table
Firpo	(Argentina) Roberto Gamarras	Resigned	14 February 2022	(Brazil) Eraldo Correia	February 2022	10th (Clausura 2022)
Santa Tecla	(Uruguay) Daniel Bartolotta	Changed roles to Sporting director	16 March 2022	(El Salvador) Leonel Cárcamo	16 March 2022	12th (Clausura 2022)
Platense	(El Salvador) Guillermo Rivera	Mutual Consent	19 April 2022	(El Salvador) Ivan Ruiz	April 2022	5th (Clausura 2022)

== Apertura ==
=== League table ===
Pos	Team	Pld	W	D	L	GF	GA	GD	Pts	Qualification or relegation
1	Alianza (Q)	22	16	3	3	48	19	+29	51	Qualification to Quarterfinals
2	FAS (Q)	22	11	5	6	33	20	+13	38	Qualification to Quarterfinals
3	Luis Ángel Firpo (Q)	22	9	8	5	36	28	+8	35	Qualification to Quarterfinals
4	Once Deportivo (Q)	22	9	8	5	39	32	+7	35	Qualification to Quarterfinals
5	Águila (Q)	22	9	7	6	36	27	+9	34	Qualification to Quarterfinals
6	Platense (Q)	22	7	8	7	22	27	−5	29	Qualification to Quarterfinals
7	Chalatenango (Q)	22	7	6	9	31	31	0	27	Qualification to Quarterfinals
8	Jocoro (Q)	22	5	11	6	31	33	−2	26	Qualification to Quarterfinals
9	Atlético Marte	22	6	7	9	22	30	−8	25	
10	Santa Tecla	22	6	6	10	23	33	−10	24	
11	Isidro Metapán	22	3	7	12	16	35	−19	16	
12	Municipal Limeño	22	2	8	12	16	38	−22	14	Relegation to the Segunda División

Updated to match(es) played on 9 October 2021. Source: Liga Pepsi
(Q) Qualified for the phase indicated

=== Apertura 2021 results ===
Round 1

Date & time	Home	Score	Away	Report
31 July – 18:00	Chalatenango	2–2	Platense	Report
31 July – 19:00	Isidro Metapán	0–0	Atlético Marte	Report
1 August – 15:00	Once Municipal	2–2	Águila	Report
1 August – 15:00	Luis Ángel Firpo	1–1	Jocoro	Report
1 August – 15:15	FAS	3–1	Santa Tecla	Report
1 August – 15:15	Alianza	4–1	Municipal Limeño	Report

Round 2

Date & time	Home	Score	Away	Report
7 August – 18:00	Atlético Marte	0–2	Chalatenango	Report
7 August – 18:00	Santa Tecla	3–0	Isidro Metapán	Report
7 August – 19:00	FAS	1–1	Águila	Report
7 August – 19:00	Jocoro	3–4	Once Municipal	Report
8 August – 15:15	Municipal Limeño	1–1	Luis Ángel Firpo	Report
8 August – 15:15	Platense	2–2	Alianza	Report

Round 3

Date & time	Home	Score	Away	Report
4 August – 15:30	FAS	4–1	Santa Tecla	Report
10 August – 15:00	Atlético Marte	0–1	Jocoro	Report
11 August – 15:30	Luis Ángel Firpo	3–2	Platense	Report
11 August – 18:00	Chalatenango	2–1	Alianza	Report
11 August – 19:00	Isidro Metapán	2–2	Águila	Report
12 August – 15:30	Once Municipal	4–1	Municipal Limeño	Report

Round 4

Date & time	Home	Score	Away	Report

Round 5

Date & time	Home	Score	Away	Report

Round 6

Date & time	Home	Score	Away	Report

Round 7

Date & time	Home	Score	Away	Report

Round 8

Date & time	Home	Score	Away	Report

Round 9

Date & time	Home	Score	Away	Report

Round 10

Date & time	Home	Score	Away	Report

Round 11

Date & time	Home	Score	Away	Report

Round 12

Date & time	Home	Score	Away	Report

Round 13

Date & time	Home	Score	Away	Report

Round 14

Date & time	Home	Score	Away	Report

Round 15

Date & time	Home	Score	Away	Report

Round 16

Date & time	Home	Score	Away	Report

Round 17

Date & time	Home	Score	Away	Report

Round 18

Date & time	Home	Score	Away	Report

Round 19

Date & time	Home	Score	Away	Report

Round 20

Date & time	Home	Score	Away	Report

Round 21

Date & time	Home	Score	Away	Report

Round 22

Date & time	Home	Score	Away	Report

==== Quarterfinals ====
===== First legs =====
1 December 2021
15:00 (UTC-6)

Jocoro	2–3	Alianza
Nelson Alvarenga 15'; Santos Guzman 49'		Rodolfo Zelaya 27' 34'; Jonathon Jimenez 67'

Polideportivo Tierra de Fuego, Jocorro
Referee: Ismael Cornejo
1 December 2021
15:15 (UTC-6)

Platense	2–2	Firpo
Rafael Burgos 8'; Camilo Delgado 10'		Luis Canales 26'; Jomal Williams 91'

Estadio Antonio Toledo Valle, Zacatecoluca
Referee: Ivan Barton
1 December 2021
19:00 (UTC-6)

Aguila	1–1	Once Deportivo
Fabricio Alfaro 47'		Jose Contreras 23'

Estadio Juan Francisco Barraza, San Miguel
Referee: Juan Quinteros
2 December 2021
18:30 (UTC-6)

Chaltenango	0–0	FAS
Nil		Nil

Estadio Gregorio Martinez

===== Second legs =====
5 January 2021
15:00 (UTC-6)

FAS	1–1	Chaltenango
Erivan Flores 40'		Bladimir Diaz 86'

Estadio Oscar Alberto Quiteno

Chalatenango won 4–2 on penalties, after drawing 1–1 on aggregate

5 December 2021
20:00 (UTC-6)

Alianza	1–0	Jocoro
Marvin Monterroza 63'		Nil

Estadio Cuscatlan, San Salvador

Alianza FC won 4–2 on Aggregate

5 December 2021
15:00 (UTC-6)

Once Deportivo	0–0	Aguila
Nil		Nil

Estadio Arturo Simeon Magana, Ahuachapan

Once Deportivo won 4–3 on penalties, after tying 1–1 aggregate

5 December 2019
15:00 (UTC-6)

Firpo	1–2	Platense
Jomal Williams 16'		Rafael Burgos 23'; Camilo Delgado 59'

Estadio Sergio Torres Rivera, Usulutan

Platense won 4–3 on aggregate

==== Semifinals ====
===== First legs =====
8 December 2021
15:30 (UTC-6)

Once Deportivo	1–1	Alianza
Enner Orellana 14'		Rodolfo Zelaya 46'

Estadio Arturo Simeon Magana, Ahuachapan
9 December 2021
19:00 (UTC-6)

Chaltenango	1–1	Platense
Kemal Malcom 19'		Denilson Rosales 45'

Estadio Gregorio Martinez, Chalatenango

===== Second legs =====
12 December 2021
15:00 (UTC-6)

Alianza	2–0	Once Deportivo
Duvier Riascos 19'; Ezquiel Rivas 57'		Nil

Estadio Cuscatlan, San Salvador
Referee: Ivan Barton

Alianza won 3–1 on aggregare

12 December 2019
15:00 (UTC-6)

Platense	1–0	Chaltenango
Camilo Delgado 73'		Nil

Estadio Antonio Toledo Valle, Zacatecoluca
Referee: German Martinez

Platense won 2–1 on aggregate

==== Final ====
20 December 2021
15:00 UTC−6
Final

Alianza	2–1	Platense
Duvier Riascos 36' 41'		Victor Landazuri 54'

Estadio Cuscatlán, San Salvador
Attendance: TBD
Referee: Ivan Barton

Alianza F.C.
GK	25	(El Salvador) Mario González
DF	4	(El Salvador) Ivan Mancía	(yellow card) 43'
DF	16	(El Salvador) Bryan Tamacas
DF	15	(El Salvador) Marvin Monterrosa
DF	12	(El Salvador) Juan Carlos Portillo	(substituted off) 72'
DF	20	(El Salvador) Jonathan Jiménez	(substituted off) 90'
MF	6	(El Salvador) Oscar Rodriguez	(substituted off) 72'
MF	27	(El Salvador) Narcisco Orellana	(yellow card) 82'
MF	21	(El Salvador) Harold Osorio
FW	11	(Colombia) Duvier Riascos	36' 41' (red card) 69'
ST	23	(El Salvador) Rodolfo Zelaya	(substituted off) 76'
Substitutes:
ST	19	(Colombia) Michell Mercado		(substituted on) 72'
ST	22	(El Salvador) Ezquiel Rivas		(substituted on) 72'
DF	10	(El Salvador) Isaac Portillo		(substituted on) 76'
DF	17	(El Salvador) Alexis Renderos		(substituted on) 90'
Manager:
(El Salvador) Milton Melendez

Platense
GK	22	(El Salvador) Manuel Gonzalez
DF	3	(El Salvador) Mario Martinez
DF	28	(El Salvador) Denilson Vidal Rosales
DF	21	(Colombia) Wilber Arizala
DF	16	(El Salvador) Gilberto Baires	(yellow card) 64'
MF	15	(El Salvador) Geovanny Sigaran	(substituted off) 85'
MF	12	(El Salvador) Steve Alfaro	(yellow card) 32'
MF	19	(El Salvador) Rodolfo Orellana	(substituted off) 46'
MF	10	(Paraguay) Javier Lezcano	(substituted off) 78'
FW	17	(Colombia) Juan Camilio Delgado
FW	23	(Colombia) Victor Landazuri	(yellow card) 47' (goal) 54'
Substitutes:
MF	4	(El Salvador) Melvin Alfaro		(substituted on) 46'
MF	6	(El Salvador) Rafael Burgos		(substituted on) 78'
MF	11	(El Salvador) Bryan Martinez		(substituted on) 85'
Manager:
(El Salvador) Guillermo Rivera

Apertura 2021 champions

16th title

=== Apertura 2021 records ===
==== Records ====
- Best home records: Alianza F.C. (31 points out of 33 points)
- Worst home records: Limeno (8 points out of 33 points)
- Best away records : Once Deportivo (21 points out of 33 points)
- Worst away records : Isidro Metapan (3 points out of 33 points)
- Most goals scored: Alianza F.C. (48 goals)
- Fewest goals scored: Isidro Metapan
  Limeno (16 goals)
- Fewest goals conceded : Alianza F.C. (19 goals)
- Most goals conceded : Limeno (38 goals)

No.	Player	Club	Goals
1	(Colombia) Duvier Riascos	Alianza F.C.	16
2	(Trinidad and Tobago) Jomal Williams	Firpo	14
3	(El Salvador) Rodolfo Zelaya	Alianza F.C.	11
4	(Colombia) Jhon Machado	Jocoro F.C.	9
5	(Colombia) Camilio Delgado	Platense	9
6	(Colombia) Luis Peralta	C.D. FAS	9
7	(Brazil) Wesley Da Silva	Firpo	8
8	(Colombia) Edgar Medrano	Once Deportivo	8
9	(El Salvador) Bryan Paz	Once Deportivo	7
10	(Argentina) Nicolas Martinez	Aguila	7

=== Scoring ===
- First goal of the season: (El Salvador) Miguel Lemus for Chalatenango against Platense, 16 minutes (2021)
- First goal by a foreign player: (Colombia) Camilo Delgado for Platense against Chalatenango, 23rd minutes (2021)
- Fastest goal in a match: 15 Seconds
  - (El Salvador) TBD for Limeno against FAS 2021)
- Goal scored at the latest goal in a match: 90+2 minutes
  - (Argentina) Nicolas Martinez goal for Aguila against Once Deportivo, (2021)
- First penalty Kick of the season: (Colombia) Camilo Delgado for Platense against Chalatenango, 23rd minutes (2021)
- Widest winning margin: 3 goals
  - Alianza F.C. 4–1 Limeno (18 October 2021)
- First hat-trick of the season: (Colombia) Duvier Riascos for Alianza F.C. against Limeno (2021)
- First own goal of the season: (El Salvador) Alexander Mendoza (Santa Tecla F.C.) for Alianza F.C. (11 October 2020)
- Most goals in a match: 8 goals
  - TBD 3–5 TBD (, 2021)
- Most goals by one team in a match: 4 goals
  - Alianza F.C. 4–1 Limeno (18 October 2021)
- Most goals in one half by one team: 3 goals
  - TBD 2–3 (2–3) TBD (2nd half, 20 December 2021)
- Most goals scored by losing team: 3 goals
  - TBD 3–5 TBD (, 2021)
- Most goals by one player in a single match: 3 goals
  - (Colombia) Duvier Riascos for Alianza against Limeno (2021)
- Players who scored a hat-trick:
  - (Colombia) Duvier Riascos for Alianza against Limeno (2021)
  - (Colombia) Duvier Riascos for Alianza against Jocoro (September __, 2021)
  - (Jamaica) Kenroy Howell for C.D. Chalatenango against Isidro Metapan (September __, 2021)
  - (El Salvador) Rodolfo Zelaya for Alianza against Santa Tecla (november 17, 2021)

== Clausura ==
=== League table ===
Pos	Team	Pld	W	D	L	GF	GA	GD	Pts	Qualification or relegation
1	Alianza	22	12	6	4	33	21	+12	42	Advance to Playoffs
2	Aguila	22	11	8	3	36	15	+21	41	Advance to Playoffs
3	Chalatenango	22	11	5	6	30	25	+5	38	Advance to Playoffs
4	Platense	22	8	7	7	24	22	+2	31	Advance to Playoffs
5	FAS	22	7	9	6	31	30	+1	30	Advance to Playoffs
6	Isidro Metapan	22	6	11	5	25	21	+4	29	Advance to Playoffs
7	Jocoro	22	7	7	8	28	33	−5	28	Advance to Playoffs
8	Luis Angel Firpo	22	6	7	9	23	22	+1	25	Advance to Playoffs
9	Municipal Limeno	22	6	7	9	18	27	−9	25	
10	Once Deportivo	22	5	8	9	16	22	−6	23	
11	Atletico Marte	22	4	8	10	19	32	−13	20	
12	Santa Tecla	22	4	7	11	19	32	−13	19	

Source: https://au.soccerway.com/national/el-salvador/primera-division/20212022/clausura---1st-phase/r63765/
Rules for classification: 1) points; 2) goal difference; 3) number of goals scored.

=== Clausura 2022 results ===
==== Quarterfinals ====
===== First legs =====
10 May 2022
15:15 (UTC-6)

FAS	0–1	Platense
Nil		Rafael Burgos 46'

Estadio Oscar Alberto Quiteno, Santa Ana
Referee: Juan Francisco Quinteros
10 May 2022
15:15 (UTC-6)

Jocoro	1–2	Aguila
Junior Padilla 37'		Kevin Santamaría 16' 68'

Polideportivo Tierra de Fuego, Jocorro
Referee: Ismael Cornejo
11 May 2022
19:15 (UTC-6)

Firpo	1–2	Alianza
Jomal Williams 48'		Wilber Arizala 73'; Marvin Monterroza 85'

Estadio Sergio Torres Rivera, Usulutan
Referee: Ivan Barton
11 May 2022
19:15 (UTC-6)

Isidro Metapan	1–0	Chaltenango
Bayron Lopez 31'		Nil

Estadio Jorge Suarez Landaverde, Metapan
Referee: Giovanni Corona

===== Second legs =====
14 May 2022
15:00 (UTC-6)

Chalatenango	1–2	Isidro Metapan
Ricardo Guevara 80'		Christian Aguilar 60'; Yerson Gutierrez 96'

Estadio Gregorio Martinez, Chalatenango

Isidro Metapan won 3–1 on aggregate

15 May 2022
20:00 (UTC-6)

Alianza	2–1	Firpo
Narciso Orellana 20'; Juan Portillo 94'		Moises Mejia 2'

Estadio Cuscatlan, San Salvador

Alianza FC won 4–2 on Aggregate

14 May 2022
15:00 (UTC-6)

Aguila	1–1	Jocoro
Santos Ortiz 45'		Junior Padilla 62'

Estadio Juan Francisco Barraza, San Miguel

Aguila won 3–2 on Aggregate

15 May 2022
15:00 (UTC-6)

Platense	2–1	FAS
Juan Barahona 41'; Victor Landazuri 46'		Rudy Calvel 8'

Estadio Antonio Toledo Valle, Zacatecoluca

Platense won 3–1 on aggregate

==== Semifinals ====
===== First legs =====
18 May 2022
14:30 (UTC-6)

Platense	1–0	Alianza
Steve Gonzalez 71'		Nil

Estadio Antonio Toledo Valle, Zacatecoluca
Referee: Edgar Ramirez
18 May 2021
19:00 (UTC-6)

Isidro Metapan	1–2	Aguila
Yerson Gutierrez 62'		Kevin Santamaria 5'; Edgar Medrano 54'

Estadio Jorge Calero Suárez, Metapan
Referee: German Martinez

===== Second legs =====
22 May 2022
15:00 (UTC-6)

Alianza	3–1	Platense
Bryan Tamacas 10'; Rodolfo Zelaya 65'; Michell Mercado 84'		Juan Barahona 43'

Estadio Cuscatlan, San Salvador

Alianza won 3–2 on aggregare

22 May 2022
15:00 (UTC-6)

Aguila	2–1	Isidro Metapan
Santos Ortiz 24'; Edgar Medrano 80'		Bairon Lopez 53'

Estadio Juan Francisco Barraza

Águila won 4–2 on aggregate

==== Final ====
29 May 2022
15:00 UTC−6
Final

Alianza	1–1	Aguila
Xavier Garcia 77' (o.g.)		Kevin Santamaria 54'
Penalties
Alexis Renderos (penalty scored); Óscar Rodríguez (penalty scored); Franco Arizala (penalty missed); Marvin Monterroza (penalty missed); Bryan Tamacas (penalty scored); Mario Jacobo (penalty scored); Narciso Orellana (penalty scored)	5–4	Fabricio Alfaro (penalty scored); Luiz Caetano (penalty missed); Edgar Medrano (penalty scored); Yan Maciel (penalty missed); Jairo Henríquez (penalty scored); Gerson Mayén (penalty scored); Fredy Espinoza (penalty missed)

Estadio Cuscatlán, San Salvador
Attendance: TBD
Referee: Edgar Ramírez

Alianza F.C.
GK	25	(El Salvador) Mario Gonzalez
DF	15	(El Salvador) Jonathan Jiménez	(substituted off) 74'
DF	4	(El Salvador) Ivan Mancía	(yellow card) 43' (red card) 54'
DF	16	(El Salvador) Henry Romero	(yellow card) 54'
DF	20	(El Salvador) Bryan Tamacas
MF	26	(El Salvador) Ezequiel Rivas	(substituted off) 60'
MF	11	(El Salvador) Juan Carlos Portillo	(substituted off) 74'
MF	21	(El Salvador) Marvin Monterrosa
MF	6	(El Salvador) Narcisco Orellana	(yellow card) 44'
ST	22	(El Salvador) Rodolfo Zelaya	(substituted off) 80'
FW	23	(Colombia) Michell Mercado
Substitutes:
ST	19	(El Salvador) Mario Jacobo		(substituted on) 60'
ST	22	(El Salvador) Oscar Ceren		(substituted on) 74' (substituted off) 113'
DF	10	(Colombia) Franco Arizala		(substituted on) 74'
DF	17	(El Salvador) Alexis Renderos		(substituted on) 80'
DF	17	(El Salvador) Oscar Rodriguez		(substituted on) 113'
Manager:
(El Salvador) Milton Melendez

Aguila
GK	22	(El Salvador) Benji Villalobos	(yellow card) 109'
DF	4	(El Salvador) Freddy Espinoza
DF	21	(El Salvador) Marlon Trejo	(substituted off) 73'
DF	16	(El Salvador) Kevin Melara	(yellow card) 60'
DF	8	(El Salvador) Xavier Garcia	(yellow card) 48' 77' (o.g.)
MF	17	(Brazil) Yan Maciel	(substituted off) 85'
MF	12	(El Salvador) Santos Ortiz	(yellow card) 32' (substituted off) 73'
MF	10	(El Salvador) Gerson Mayen	(yellow card) 50'
MF	15	(El Salvador) Fabricio Alfaro
FW	11	(El Salvador) Kevin Santamaria	54' (substituted off) 73'
FW	20	(Colombia) Edgar Medrano	(yellow card) 62'
Substitutes:
MF	4	(El Salvador) Jairo Henriquez		(substituted on) 73'
MF	6	(Colombia) Fabio Burbano		(substituted on) 73'
MF	11	(El Salvador) Edwin Lazo		(substituted on) 73' (substituted off) 120'
MF	6	(Brazil) Luiz Caetano		(substituted on) 120'
Manager:
(Peru) Agustin Castillo

Clausura 2022 champions

17th title

=== Clausura 2022 records ===
==== Records ====
- Best home records: Alianza F.C.
  Jocoro
  Chalatenango (22 points out of 33 points)
- Worst home records: Atletico Marte (12 points out of 33 points)
- Best away records : Aguila (21 points out of 33 points)
- Worst away records : Santa Tecla F.C. (5 points out of 33 points)
- Most goals scored: Aguila (36 goals)
- Fewest goals scored: Once Deportivo de Ahuachapan (16 goals)
- Fewest goals conceded :Aguila (15 goals)
- Most goals conceded : Jocoro (33 goals)

No.	Player	Club	Goals
1	(Colombia) Bladimir Diaz	FAS	9
2	(Colombia) Andres Quejada	Atletico Marte	8
3	(El Salvador) Kevin Santamaria	Aguila	7
4	(Colombia) (Mexico) Franco Arizala	Alianza F.C.	7
5	(El Salvador) Irvin Herrera	Platense	7
6	(Colombia) Jhon Machado	Jocoro	6
7	(Panama) (El Salvador) Nicolas Munoz	Limeno	6
8	(Colombia) Carlos Salazar	Chalatenango	6
9	(El Salvador) Roberto Gonzalez	Santa Tecla	6
10	(Trinidad and Tobago) Jomal Williams	LA Firpo	5

=== Scoring ===
- First goal of the season: (Colombia) Henry Castillo for Firpo against Limeno, 9 minutes (15 January 2022)
- First goal by a foreign player: (Colombia) Henry Castillo for Firpo against Limeno, 9 minutes (15 January 2022)
- Fastest goal in a match: 2 Minutes
  - (Honduras) Jair Crisanto for Jocoro against Alianza, (22 January 2022)
- Goal scored at the latest goal in a match: 94 minutes
  - (El Salvador) Nelson Alvarenga goal for Jocoro against FAS, (26 January 2022)
- First penalty Kick of the season: (El Salvador) Fabricio Alfaro for Aguila against FAS, 81st minutes (23 January 2022)
- Widest winning margin: 3 goals
  - Aguila 4–1 Jocoro (26 January 2022)
  - FAS 3–0 Atletico Marte (13 February 2022)
- First hat-trick of the season: (Colombia) Carlos Salazar for C.D. Chalatenango against Jocoro (23 April 2022)
- First own goal of the season: (El Salvador) Kevin Galdamez (Jocoro) for Isidro Metapan (13 February 2022)
- Most goals in a match: 11 goals
  - Jocoro F.C. 6–5 C.D. Chalatenango (23 April 2022)
- Most goals by one team in a match: 4 goals
  - Aguila 4–1 Jocoro (26 January 2022)
- Most goals in one half by one team: 4 goals
  - Jocoro 4–3 (6–5) C.D. Chalatenango (2nd half, 23 April 2022)
- Most goals scored by losing team: 5 goals
  - C.D. Chalatenango 5–6 Jocoro F.C. (23 April 2022)
- Most goals by one player in a single match: 3 goals
  - (Colombia) Carlos Salazar for C.D. Chalatenango against Jocoro (23 April 2022)
- Players who scored a hat-trick:
  - (Colombia) Carlos Salazar for C.D. Chalatenango against Jocoro (23 April 2022)
  - (Colombia) Franco Arizala for Alianza against Limeno (23 April 2022)

== Aggregate table ==
The aggregate table is the general ranking for the 2021–22 season. This table is a sum of the Apertura 2021 and Clausura 2022 tournament standings. The aggregate table is used to determine seeding for the CONCACAF Tournaments and relegation to the segunda division.

== List of foreign players in the league ==
This is a list of foreign players in the 2021–22 season. The following players:

1. Have played at least one game for the respective club.
2. Have not been capped for the El Salvador national football team on any level, independently from the birthplace

A new rule was introduced this season, that clubs can have four foreign players per club and can only add a new player if there is an injury or a player is released and it is before the close of the season transfer window.

Águila

- (Brazil) Yan Maciel
- (Brazil) Luiz Carlos Caetano de Azevedo Júnior
- (Brazil) Lucas Ventura
- (Argentina) Nicolas Martinez
- (Honduras) Elison Rivas
- (Colombia) Edgar Medrano
- (Colombia) Fáider Fabio Burbano

Alianza

- (Colombia) Mitchel Mercado
- (Colombia) Victor Arboleda
- (Colombia) Duvier Riascos
- (Colombia) Stiver Mena
- (Colombia) Franco Arizala

Atletico Marte

- (Colombia) Andres Quejada
- (Brazil) Ricardinho
- (Uruguay) Joaquin Verges
- (Colombia) Yoan Ballesteros
- (Colombia) Luis Cuesta Col
- (Colombia) Eduardo Rodriguez
- (Colombia) Tardelius Pena

Chalatenango

- (Jamaica) Kemal Orlando Malcolm
- (Jamaica) Kenroy Howell
- (Cuba) Yosel Piedra
- (Colombia) Bladimir Diaz
- (Colombia) Carlos Salazar
- (Colombia) Hector Renteria
- (Mexico) Dieter Vargas

FAS

- (Colombia) Luis Peralta
- (Panama) Roberto Chen
- (Honduras) Clayvin Zuniga
- (Argentina) Mateo Ahmed
- (Colombia) Jeferson Collazos
- (Colombia) Bladimir Diaz

Firpo

- (Colombia) Tardelius Pena
- (Trinidad and Tobago) Jomal Williams
- (Brazil) Wesley Tanque Da Silva
- (Costa Rica) Darryl Parker
- (Colombia) Henry Castillo
- (Brazil) Gabriel Ventura

Isidro Metapán

- (Spain) Gregori Diaz
- (Spain) Manuel Dimas Suarez
- (Spain) Juan Ramón García Martínez
- (Nicaragua) Luis Copete
- (Honduras) Edenilson Paulino Castillo
- (Brazil) Joao Do Rosario
- (Colombia) Jhoaho Hinestroza
- (Colombia) Yerson Gutierrez Cuenca
- (Argentina) Luca Orozco

Jocoro

- (Honduras) Junior Padilla
- (Colombia) John Machado
- (Paraguay) Diego Areco
- (Paraguay) Jose Luis Rodriguez
- (Honduras) Jairy Crisanto
- (Honduras) Nissi Sauceda
- (Colombia) Yohalin Palacios

Limeño

- (Mexico) Felipe Ponce
- (Colombia) William Palacio
- (Colombia) Yosimar Quinones
- (Colombia) Manual Murillo
- (Paraguay) Sandro Melgarejo
- (Paraguay) Javier Lescano
- (Colombia) Yair Arboleda

Once Deportivo

- (Colombia) Edgar Medrano
- (Mexico) Dieter Vargas
- (Jamaica) Craig Foster
- (Uruguay) José Miguel Barreto
- (Argentina) Juan Ignaio Mare
- (Jamaica) Kamoy Kadeem Simpson
- (Jamaica) Jabari Hylton

Platense

- (Colombia) Camilo Delgado
- (Colombia) Wilber Arizala
- (Colombia) Victor Labndazuri
- (Paraguay) Javier Lescano

Santa Tecla

- (Mexico) Alejandro Dautt
- (Uruguay) Cristian Olivera
- (Colombia) Eduardo Rodriguez
- (Uruguay) Fabricio Silva
- (Mexico) Elio Castro
- (Mexico) Jahir Barraza

(player released during the Apertura season) (player released between the Apertura and Clausura seasons) (player released during the Clausura season) (player naturalized for the Clausura season)
