= Ezequiel Rivas =

Salvadoran footballer (born 1998)

Personal information
- Full name: Elías Ezequiel Rivas Muñoz
- Date of birth: 20 May 1998 (age 28)
- Place of birth: Ilobasco, El Salvador
- Height: 1.73 m (5 ft 8 in)
- Position: Midfielder

Team information
- Current team: Hércules
- Number: 26

Youth career
- Turín FESA
- 2015–2017: Alianza

Senior career*
Years	Team	Apps	(Gls)
2017–2025	Alianza	161	(30)
2017–2018	→ Once Lobos (loan)		
2020–2021	→ Chalatenango (loan)	25	(4)
2025–	Hércules	0	(0)

International career^{‡}
2019–2021	El Salvador U23	4	(0)
2024–	El Salvador	2	(1)
- * Club domestic league appearances and goals as of 20:00, 21 May 2025 (UTC) ‡ National team caps and goals as of 20:00, 27 July 2024 (UTC)

Elías Ezequiel Rivas Muñoz (born 20 May 1998) is a Salvadoran professional footballer who plays as a midfielder for Primera División club Hércules and the El Salvador national team.

== Club career ==
=== Alianza ===
On 29 May 2025, it was announced that Rivas would depart from Alianza, ending his 10-year term at the club.

== International career ==
=== Senior ===
On 27 July 2024, Rivas earned his first cap for the senior team in a friendly match against Guatemala and scored his first international goal in a 1-0 win.

== Honours ==
Alianza

- Primera División: 2019 Apertura, 2021 Apertura, 2022 Clausura, 2024 Clausura, 2025 Clausura
