= Malvestiti =

Malvestiti is an Italian surname. Notable people with the surname include:

- Edgardo Malvestiti (born 1969), former Argentine professional football player and currently manager
- Federico Malvestiti (born 2000), Italian racing driver
- Maurizio Malvestiti (born 1953), Italian bishop of the Roman Catholic Diocese of Lodi
- Piero Malvestiti (1899–1964), Italian politician
