= C.D. Hércules =

Association football club in El Salvador

Hércules
- Full name: Club Deportivo Hércules
- Nicknames: Los Estrellas Negras (The Black Stars); Helénicos; Blanquinegros; Decano; Azulgrana
- Founded: 25 September 1904 (first time); 9 May 2025 (re-foundation)
- Ground: Estadio Cuscatlán
- Capacity: 44,836
- Chairman: (El Salvador) Giancarlo Angelucci
- Manager: (Argentina) Gabriel Alvarez
- League: Primera División
- 2026 Clausura: Overall: 10th Playoffs: Did not qualify
Home colours	Away colours	Third colours

Club Deportivo Hércules is a professional football team that play in San Salvador, El Salvador. They were founded on 25 September 1904 as Club Deportivo Hércules as a sporting club focused on athletics, swimming, basketball and football.

Hércules was a powerhouse during the late 1920s and early 1930s, winning titles in 1927, 1928 and in the 1929–30, 1930–31, 1931–32, 1932–33, 1933–34 seasons. Although the Primera División de Fútbol Profesional in El Salvador didn't exist at that time, and the Salvadoran Sports Commission (Comisión Nacional de Educación Física) didn't conduct an official national tournament during those years, the championships they won are often considered the national titles. Hercules won their first title on the 13th of November, 1927 defeating Chinameca S.C. 3–0. It was re-established on May 9, 2025, to participate in the Primera División series starting with the 2025 Apertura Tournament.

== History ==
=== Recent events ===
After several decades of hiatus, It was announced on March 15, 2025 that Once Deportivo de Ahuachapan would be moving from Ahuachapán to San Salvador due to minimal fan support and council support. FESFUT announced no longer allowed to multi-club ownership which meant Salume group who owned Once Deportivo (along with Aguila and Alianza) gave their ownership to another group of investor. On May 9, 2025 It was announced that the historic club Hercules was would be taking over Once Deportivo's former spot in the Primera División series in the Apertura 2025. Later, the club's board of directors, history, and official crest were officially presented on the Canal 4 forums on TCS (in the Yo me llamo studios). The event was attended by various sports journalists.

The team will participate in the CONCACAF Central American Cup as one of El Salvador's representatives, based on the title won by its predecessor in the 2024 Apertura Tournament.

== Honours ==
=== Domestic honours ===
==== Leagues ====
- Primera División Salvadoran and predecessors
  - Champions (7): 1927, 1928, 1929–30, 1930–31, 1931–32, 1932–33, 1933–34

==== Cups ====
- Supacopa de Campeones
  - Winners (1): 2025

== Sponsorship ==
Companies that Hercules currently has sponsorship deals with for 2025–2026 includes:

- (Italy) Macron – Official kit suppliers
- (United States) Pepsi – Official sponsors
- (United States) Mister Donut – Official sponsors
- (El Salvador) Canal 4 – Official sponsors
- (United States) Gatorade – Official sponsors

== Stadium ==
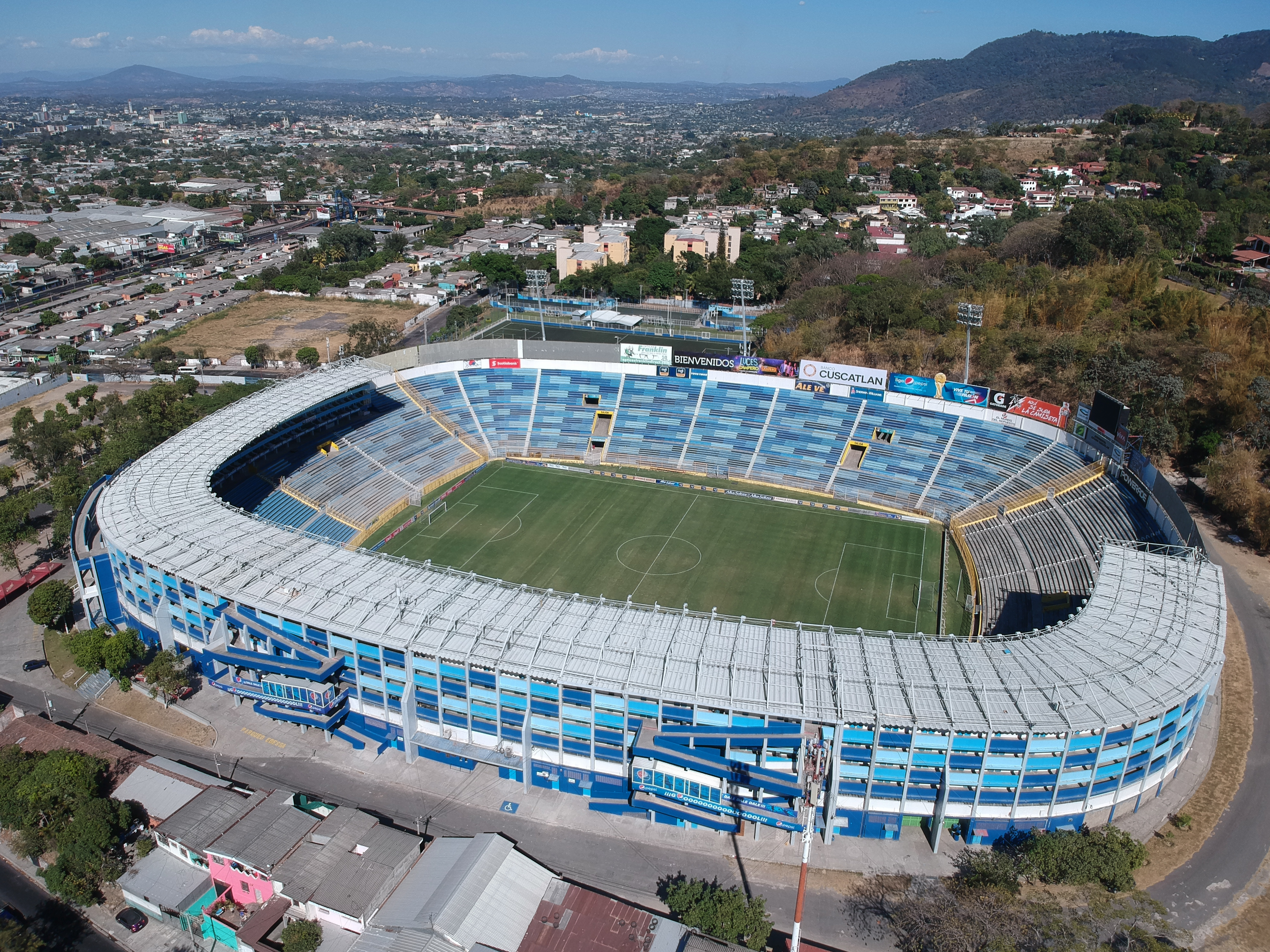

Estadio Cuscatlán has been home to Hércules since 2025. It has a capacity of 44,836.

- Estadio Cuscatlán (2025-Present)
  - Estadio Las Delicias (2025-Present) games in the CONCACAF Central America Cup

== Record ==
- From 1927 to 1933, the club won seven successive league titles, equalling the all-time record.

=== Historical Matches ===
November 4, 1929 Friendly	Hercules	0-11	C.S. Herediano	San Salvador, El Salvador
				Stadium: Campo de Marte

=== Record versus other Clubs ===
As of 2025-08-22

The Concacaf opponents below = Official tournament results: (Plus a sampling of other results)

Opponent	Last Meeting	G	W	D	L	F	A	PTS	+/-
(El Salvador) Aguila	2025 Central American Cup	1	0	0	1	0	2	0	-2
(Honduras) Olimpia	2025 Central American Cup	1	0	0	1	1	3	0	-2
(Nicaragua) Real Esteli	2025 Central American Cup	1	0	0	1	0	3	0	-3
(Guatemala) Xelajú	2025 Central American Cup	1	0	0	1	0	2	0	-2
Totals									

== Club records ==
- First victory in the Primera Division for Jocoro: 3-2 Firpo, July 29, 2018
- First goalscorer in the Primera Division for Jocoro: Paraguayan Jorge Caceres v Firpo 29 July 2018
- 100th goal in the Primera Division for Jocoro: Honduran Ovidio Lanza v Atletico Marte 4 January 2021
- Largest Home victory, Primera División: 5-1 v Limeno 25 October 2020
- Largest Away victory, Primera División: 3-0 v Pasaquina, 29 October 2018
- Largest Home loss, Primera División: 1–3 v Chalatenango, 4 November 2018
- Largest Away loss, Primera División: 1-4 v A.D. Isidro Metapan, 7 April 2019
- Highest home attendance: 2,000 v Primera División, 2018
- Highest away attendance: 1,000 v Primera División, San Salvador, 2018
- Highest average attendance, season: 49,176, Primera División
- Most goals scored, season, Primera División: 25, Apertura 2018
- Worst season: Segunda Division 2002-2003: 1 win, 4 draws and 17 losses (7 points)
- First CONCACAF tournament match (2025 CONCACAF Central American Cup): Hercules 0-2 Xelajú; Estadio Las Delicias, Santa Tecla; July 30, 2025.
- Largest Home victory, CONCACAF tournament match (2023 CONCACAF Central American Cup): 5-1 v TBD, 2023
- Largest Away victory, CONCACAF tournament match (2023 CONCACAF Central American Cup): 3-0 v TBD, 2023
- Largest Home loss, CONCACAF tournament match (2025 CONCACAF Central American Cup): 1-3 Olimpia; Estadio Las Delicias, Santa Tecla; August 6, 2025.
- Largest Away loss, CONCACAF tournament match (2025 CONCACAF Central American Cup): 0-2 v Xelajú, 23 August 2025
  0-2 v Aguila, 13 August 2025
- First goal scorer in International competition: Jose Posada (v. Olimpia; Estadio Las Delicias; 6 August 2025)

== Players ==
=== Current squad ===
As of 4 April 2026 Note: Flags indicate national team as defined under FIFA eligibility rules; some limited exceptions apply. Players may hold more than one non-FIFA nationality.

No.	Pos.	Nation	Player
1	GK	ESA	César Melara
2	DF	ESA	William Sibrián
3	DF	ESA	Diego Chevez
4	DF	ESA	Iván Mancía (captain)
6	DF	ESA	Efrain Carcamo
7	MF	ESA	Kelvin Hernández
8	MF	ESA	César Flores
10	MF	ESA	Henry Sincuir
11	DF	ESA	Byron López
12	MF	ESA	Angel Ortega
14	MF	ESA	Christian Aguilar
15	MF	ESA	Samuel Rosales

No.	Pos.	Nation	Player
16	MF	ESA	Rodrigo Rivera
17	MF	ESA	Eduardo González
20	DF	ESA	Mario Martínez
24	FW	ESA	Kevin Leonor
26	MF	ESA	Ezequiel Rivas
27	DF	ESA	Marvín Morales
29	MF	ESA	Kevin Velasquez
55	FW	ESA	Jason Argueta
58	MF	ESA	Diego Rosales

=== In ===
Note: Flags indicate national team as defined under FIFA eligibility rules; some limited exceptions apply. Players may hold more than one non-FIFA nationality.

No.	Pos.	Nation	Player
—		ESA	TBD (From TBD)
—		ESA	TBD (From TBD)
—		ESA	TBD (From TBD)
—		ESA	TBD (From TBD)

No.	Pos.	Nation	Player
—		ESA	TBD (From TBD)
—		ESA	TBD (From TBD)
—		ESA	TBD (From TBD)

=== Out ===
Note: Flags indicate national team as defined under FIFA eligibility rules; some limited exceptions apply. Players may hold more than one non-FIFA nationality.

No.	Pos.	Nation	Player
—	DF	ESA	Bryan Tamacas (To Alianza)
—	FW	ESA	José Posada (To Isidro Metapan)
—		ESA	César Flores (To Isidro Metapan)
—	GK	ESA	Gerson López (To Inter Santa Tecla)
—		ESA	Isaac Esquivel (To Inter Santa Tecla)
—		ESA	Marvin Morrales (To Once Municipal)
—		ESA	Mario Martínez (To Atletico Balboa)
—		ESA	Ivan Mancia (To INCA-Aruba)
—		ESA	Diego Chevez (To UES)
—		ESA	César Melara (To UES)
—		ESA	TBD (To TBD)

No.	Pos.	Nation	Player
—		ESA	Dennis García (To Inter Santa Tecla)
—		ESA	Enrique Vásquez (To Inter Santa Tecla)
—		ESA	TBD (To TBD)
—		ESA	TBD (To TBD)
—		ESA	TBD (To TBD)
—		ESA	TBD (To TBD)
—		ESA	TBD (To TBD)
—		ESA	TBD (To TBD)

== Personnel ==
=== Coaching staff ===
As of May 2026

Position	Staff
Coach	TBD (*)
Assistant manager	(El Salvador) Francisco Hernandez (*)
Reserve manager	(El Salvador) Francisco Hernandez (*)
Goalkeeper Coach	(El Salvador) TBD (*)
Under 17 Manager	(El Salvador) Juan Gilardo (*)
Under 15 Manager	(El Salvador) TBD
Sporting director	(El Salvador) TBD (*)
Fitness Coach	(Colombia) TBD (*)
Team Doctor	(El Salvador) TBD (*)
Fitness Coach	(El Salvador) TBD (*)
Physiotherapy	(El Salvador) Sergio Torres (*)
Video Analyst	(Brazil) Felipe Dos Santos (*)
Utility	(El Salvador) TBD (*)

== Management ==
As of October 2025

Position	Staff
Owner	(El Salvador) TBD
President	(El Salvador) Carlos Rovira Alvarado
Vice-president	(El Salvador) Juan Carlos Montes
Treasure	(El Salvador) TBD
Executive secretary	(El Salvador) TBD
Board Member	(El Salvador) Gerardo Arias
Board Member	(El Salvador) Fernando Cuenca
Board Member	(El Salvador) Pedro Artana
Director of operations	(El Salvador) TBD
Brand Representative	(El Salvador) TBD
Administrative representative	(El Salvador) TBD
Grassroots Representative	(El Salvador) TBD
Sports director	(El Salvador) TBD

=== List of President ===
- (El Salvador) Giancarlo Angelucci (May 2025 - October 2025)
- (El Salvador) Carlos Rovira Alvarado (October 2025 - Present)

== Notable players ==
- (El Salvador) Américo González
- (El Salvador) Antonio Toledo
- (El Salvador) Tono Melendez (Cangrejo)
- (El Salvador) Rogelio Aviles (Jocote)
- (El Salvador) Miguel Tabata Aguilar
- (Spain) (El Salvador) Santiago Barrachina
- (El Salvador) Manuel Cano

== List of coaches ==
- Hiatus (-2025)
- (Argentina) Gabriel Alvarez (June 2025 - October 2025)
- (El Salvador) Francisco Hernandez (Interim-1 game) (October 2025)
- (Uruguay) Nicolás Dos Santos (Interim-2 games) (October 2025 - December 2025)
- (Argentina) Daniel Corti (December 2025 - May 2026)
- (El Salvador) Francisco Hernandez (May 2026)
- Hiatus (June 2026 - Present)

=== Notable managers ===
The following managers have won at least one trophy while in charge at Hercules:

Name	Nationality	From	To	Honours
Gabriel Alvarez	Argentina	1 June 2025	21 October 2025	1 Supercopa de Campeones (2025)

== Other departments ==
=== Football ===
==== Reserve team ====
The reserve team serves mainly as the final stepping stone for promising young players under the age of 21 before being promoted to the main team. The second team is coached by TBD. the team played in the Primera División Reserves, their greatest successes were finishing runner up in the Reserve championships in the Clausura 2024. It plays its home matches at TBD, adjacent to the first teams and women's team.

Name	Nat	Tenure	Notes
TBD	(El Salvador)	June 2025 - Present	N/A

=== Current squad ===
As of: June, 2025 Note: Flags indicate national team as defined under FIFA eligibility rules; some limited exceptions apply. Players may hold more than one non-FIFA nationality.

No.	Pos.	Nation	Player
—		ESA	TBD
—		ESA	TBD
—		ESA	TBD
—		ESA	TBD
—		ESA	TBD

No.	Pos.	Nation	Player
—		ESA	TBD
—		ESA	TBD
—		ESA	TBD
—		ESA	TBD
—		ESA	TBD

==== Junior teams ====
The youth team (under 17 and under 15) has produced some of El Salvador's top football players, including TBD and TBD. It plays its home matches at TBD, adjacent to the first team's ground, and it is coached by Juan Gilardo (under 17) and TBD (Under 15). The team greatest successes was runners up Clausura 2026 season.

Name	Nat	Tenure
Juan Gilardo	(El Salvador)	June 2025 - Present

=== Current squad ===
As of: June, 2025 Note: Flags indicate national team as defined under FIFA eligibility rules; some limited exceptions apply. Players may hold more than one non-FIFA nationality.

No.	Pos.	Nation	Player
—		ESA	TBD
—		ESA	TBD
—		ESA	TBD
—		ESA	TBD
—		ESA	TBD

No.	Pos.	Nation	Player
—		ESA	TBD
—		ESA	TBD
—		ESA	TBD
—		ESA	TBD
—		ESA	TBD

==== Women's team ====
The women's first team, which is led by head coach TBD, features several members of the El Salvador national ladies team. Their greatest successes were reaching the semi finals of Apertura 2023, where they lost 10–1 on aggregate to Alianza Women's.

Name	Nat	Tenure
TBD	(El Salvador)	June 2025 - Present

=== Current squad ===
As of: June, 2025 Note: Flags indicate national team as defined under FIFA eligibility rules; some limited exceptions apply. Players may hold more than one non-FIFA nationality.

No.	Pos.	Nation	Player
—		ESA	TBD
—		ESA	TBD
—		ESA	TBD
—		ESA	TBD
—		ESA	TBD

No.	Pos.	Nation	Player
—		ESA	TBD
—		ESA	TBD
—		ESA	TBD
—		ESA	TBD
—		ESA	TBD

=== In ===
Note: Flags indicate national team as defined under FIFA eligibility rules; some limited exceptions apply. Players may hold more than one non-FIFA nationality.

No.	Pos.	Nation	Player
—		ESA	Khatya Zecena (From FAS Femenino)
—		ESA	Andrea Perez (From Isidro Metapan Femenino)
—		ESA	Kriscia Valle (From TBD)
—		ESA	Marilyn Rubio (From TBD)
—		ESA	Arely Donez (From TBD)
—		ESA	Ambar Perez (From TBD)
—		ESA	Helen Siguenza (From TBD)

No.	Pos.	Nation	Player
—		ESA	Alejandra Perez (From TBD)
—		ESA	Lesly Valencia (From TBD)
—		ESA	Yoselin Cortez (From TBD)
—		ESA	Denise Montoya (From TBD)
—		ESA	Ashlet Diaz (From TBD)
—		ESA	Jennifer Barrientos (From TBD)
