= Iván Mancía =

Salvadoran footballer (born 1989)

Personal information
- Full name: Iván Roberto Mancía Ramírez
- Date of birth: May 1, 1989 (age 37)
- Place of birth: Apopa, San Salvador, El Salvador
- Height: 1.83 m (6 ft 0 in)
- Position: Defender

Team information
- Current team: Hércules
- Number: 4

Senior career*
| Years | Team | Apps | (Gls) |
| 2007–2009 | Vendaval | 43 | (0) |
| 2010 | Turín FESA | 21 | (1) |
| 2011 | Brasilia | 27 | (3) |
| 2011–2017 | Santa Tecla | 169 | (6) |
| 2017–2025 | Alianza | 258 | (15) |
| 2025– | Hércules | 0 | (0) |

International career
| 2015–2021 | El Salvador | 26 | (0) |
- * Club domestic league appearances and goals as of 20:00, 4 May 2025 (UTC)

Iván Roberto Mancía Ramírez (born May 1, 1989) is a Salvadoran professional footballer who plays as a defender for Primera División club Hércules.

== Club career ==
=== Alianza ===
On 21 May 2017, it announced that Mancía would sign for Alianza. A week later, during the presentation, Mancía stated that it was always his dream to play for the club.

== Personal life ==
On 26 December 2017, Mancía married his long-time girlfriend, Jennifer.

== Honours ==
- Alianza
  - Primera División: Apertura 2017, Clausura 2018, Apertura 2019, Apertura 2020, Apertura 2021, Clausura 2022, Clausura 2024
- Santa Tecla
  - Primera División: Clausura 2015, Apertura 2016, Clausura 2017
