= Fabricio Alfaro =

Salvadoran footballer (born 1990)

Personal information
- Full name: Fabricio Heriberto Alfaro Torres
- Date of birth: December 3, 1990 (age 35)
- Place of birth: San Salvador, El Salvador
- Height: 1.70 m (5 ft 7 in)
- Position: Midfielder

Senior career*
Years	Team	Apps	(Gls)
2007–2008	San Salvador FC		
2008–2009	CD Chalatenango		
2009–2010	Herediano reserves		
2010–2012	CD Atlético Marte		
2012–2013	Santa Tecla FC		
2013–2015	CD Luis Ángel Firpo		
2015–2016	CD UES		
2016–2017	CD Municipal Limeño		
2017–2020	AD Isidro Metapán	77	(2)
2020	CD El Vencedor		
2020-2022	CD Águila		
2023	Pipil		

International career
2008–2009	El Salvador U-20		
2010	El Salvador U-21		
2018–	El Salvador	2	(0)
- * Club domestic league appearances and goals

Fabricio Heriberto Alfaro Torres (born May 13, 1990) is a Salvadoran professional footballer who plays as a midfielder and most recently played for C.D. Águila.

== Club career ==
Fabricio Alfaro's professional career began on July 3, 2007 when he signed a contract with now defunct Salvadoran national league club, San Salvador. He was one of six players from the El Salvador U17 national team, that would sign for San Salvador that season.

The others were Ricardo Orellana, Diego Chavarría, Xavier García, Óscar Arroyo and William Maldonado.

He made his professional debut on November 7, 2007, in a league match against Vista Hermosa, and scored his first goal on April 16, 2008 in a league match against Chalatenango.

In 2008, Alfaro signed to Chalatenango for one year.

Early in 2009, around February or March, Alfaro signed to Costa Rican club Herediano under the youth system.

For the Apertura 2010 tournament, Alfaro returned to El Salvador to play for Atlético Marte.

For the Apertura 2012 tournament, Alfaro signed for the then newly promoted team of the Primera División, Santa Tecla. Subsequently, the player would sign for Luis Ángel Firpo of Usulután.

From the Apertura 2015 tournament, Alfaro signed for UES, this being one of his biggest challenges in his career, because with the scarlet team he was fighting to avoid the relegation. After an irregular season with UES, he signed for Municipal Limeño in the Apertura 2016 tournament.

After a regular tournament with the Santa Rosa de Lima team, Alfaro signed with Isidro Metapán for the Apertura 2017. With the Santa Ana team, and after a good performance, was taken into account by Carlos de los Cobos in the calls of the El Salvador national team as 2018.

== Career statistics ==
=== Club ===
As of November 2018.

Club	Season	League		League Cup		Continental		Other		Total	
Club	Season	Apps	Goals	Apps	Goals	Apps	Goals	Apps	Goals	Apps	Goals
San Salvador	Apertura 2007	4	0	–		0	0	0	0	4	0
San Salvador	Clausura 2008	7	1	–		0	0	0	0	7	1
Chalatenango	Apertura 2008	6	0	–		0	0	0	0	6	0
Career total		17	1	–		0	0	0	0	17	1
