= Ignacio Flores (Uruguayan footballer) =

Uruguayan footballer (born 1990)

Personal information
- Full name: Ignacio Flores Ferrando
- Date of birth: 31 July 1990 (age 36)
- Place of birth: Montevideo, Uruguay
- Height: 1.82 m (6 ft 0 in)
- Position: Striker

Senior career*
| Years | Team | Apps | (Gls) |
| 2009–2014 | River Plate Montevideo | | |
| 2009–2011 | → Rentistas (loan) | 14 | (9) |
| 2011–2012 | → Mallorca B (loan) | 16 | (3) |
| 2014 | Galícia | | |
| 2014 | Torque | 7 | (0) |
| 2014–2015 | Canadian SC | | |
| 2015–2016 | Petapa | | |
| 2016–2017 | Águila | | |
| 2017 | Colón Fútbol Club | | |
| 2017 | Rentistas | 11 | (4) |
- * Club domestic league appearances and goals

Ignacio Flores Ferrando (born July 31, 1990) is a Uruguayan former professional footballer who played as a striker.
