= Xavier García (footballer) =

Salvadoran footballer (born 1990)

Personal information
- Full name: Moisés Xavier García Orellana
- Date of birth: 26 June 1990 (age 36)
- Place of birth: San Salvador, El Salvador
- Height: 1.80 m (5 ft 11 in)
- Position: Defender

Team information
- Current team: Platense

Youth career
- 2005–2006: ADFA San Salvador
- 2006–2007: Fundación Mágico González

Senior career*
Years	Team	Apps	(Gls)
2007–2008	San Salvador F.C.	18	
2008–2009	Nejapa F.C.	8	
2009–2014	Luis Ángel Firpo	160	
2014–2021	FAS	257	(11)
2021-2023	Aguila	52	
2023-Present	Platense	105	

International career
2006–2007	El Salvador U17	7	(0)
2008–2009	El Salvador U20	6	(0)
2010–2010	El Salvador U21		
2010–2014	El Salvador U23	2	(1)
2008–2019	El Salvador	69	(1)
- * Club domestic league appearances and goals as of 17 February 2021

Moisés Xavier García Orellana (born 26 June 1990) is a Salvadoran professional footballer who plays as a defender for Platense and the El Salvador national team.

== Club career ==
=== San Salvador FC ===
García was born in San Salvador, El Salvador. His professional career began on 3 July 2007, when he signed a contract with now defunct Salvadoran national league club, San Salvador F.C. He was one of six players from the El Salvador U17 national team, that would sign for San Salvador F.C. that season. The others were Ricardo Orellana, Diego Chavarría, William Maldonado, Óscar Arroyo and Fabricio Alfaro.

He made his professional debut on 7 November 2007 in a league match against C.D. Vista Hermosa.

=== Nejapa FC ===
García signed with Nejapa F.C. in 2008.

=== Luis Ángel Firpo ===
He signed with C.D. Luis Ángel Firpo in 2009.

== International career ==
García made his debut for El Salvador in a May 2008 friendly match against Guatemala and had, as of December 2010, earned a total of 2 caps, scoring no goals. In December 2010 national team manager José Luis Rugamas named García in his 2011 UNCAF Nations Cup squad.

== Career statistics ==
El Salvador's goal tally first.

International appearances and goals
#	Date	Venue	Opponent	Result	Competition	Goals	Minutes played	Extras
1	30 May 2008	Robert F. Kennedy Memorial Stadium, Washington, D.C.	Guatemala	0–0	Friendly	0	?	(substituted on) ?'
2	12 October 2010	Estadio Carlos Ugalde Álvarez, Ciudad Quesada, Costa Rica	Costa Rica	1–2	Friendly	0	39	(substituted on) 51'
3	14 January 2011	Estadio Rommel Fernández, Panama City, Panama	Nicaragua	2–0	2011 Copa Centroamericana	0	90	(yellow card) 75'
4	16 January 2011	Estadio Rommel Fernández, Panama City, Panama	Belize	5–2	2011 Copa Centroamericana	0	90	
5	18 January 2011	Estadio Rommel Fernández, Panama City, Panama	Panama	0–2	2011 Copa Centroamericana	0	90	(yellow card) 16'
6	23 January 2011	Estadio Rommel Fernández, Panama City, Panama	Panama	0–0 (4–5 pen.)	2011 Copa Centroamericana	0	90	(yellow card) 90'
7	9 February 2011	Estadio Cuscatlán, San Salvador, El Salvador	Haiti	1–0	Friendly	0	90	
8	24 March 2011	Estadio Pedro Marrero, Havana, Cuba	Cuba	1–0	Friendly	0	90	
9	29 March 2011	Estadio Cuscatlán, San Salvador, El Salvador	Jamaica	2–3	Friendly	0	90	
10	29 May 2011	Robertson Stadium, Houston, United States	Honduras	2–2	Friendly	0	90	
11	5 June 2011	Cowboys Stadium, Arlington, Texas	Mexico	0–5	2011 CONCACAF Gold Cup	0	90	
12	9 June 2011	Bank of America Stadium, Charlotte, North Carolina	Costa Rica	1–1	2011 CONCACAF Gold Cup	0	90	
13	12 June 2011	Soldier Field, Chicago, Illinois	Cuba	6–1	2011 CONCACAF Gold Cup	0	90	(yellow card) 82'
14	19 June 2011	Robert F. Kennedy Memorial Stadium, Washington, D.C.	Panama	1–1 (a.e.t.) (3–5 pen.)	2011 CONCACAF Gold Cup	0	90	
15	7 August 2011	Robert F. Kennedy Memorial Stadium, Washington, D.C.	Venezuela	2–1	Friendly	0	90	
16	11 September 2011	Truman Bodden Stadium, George Town, Cayman Islands	Cayman Islands	1–4	2014 FIFA World Cup qualification	1	90	90+3'

== Honours ==
Luis Ángel Firpo

- Salvadoran Primera División: Clausura 2013

C.D. FAS

- Salvadoran Primera División runner-up: Apertura 2015
