= Nicolás Fagúndez =

Uruguayan footballer (born 1986)

Personal information
- Full name: Nicolás Emilio Fagúndez Sequeira
- Date of birth: February 20, 1986 (age 40)
- Place of birth: Salto, Uruguay
- Height: 1.76 m (5 ft 9 in)
- Position: Forward

Senior career*
Years	Team	Apps	(Gls)
2011–2015	Tacuarembó		
2014	→ Galícia Esporte Clube (loan)		
2015–2016	San Marcos de Arica	24	(4)
2016–2017	Aguila	42	(8)
2017	Tacuarembó	14	(0)
2017–2018	Sonsonate	23	(2)
2018–2019	Isidro Metapán	39	(1)
2019	Tacuarembó	11	(1)
- * Club domestic league appearances and goals

Nicolás Emilio Fagúndez Sequeira (born February 20, 1986) is an Uruguayan former professional footballer who played as a forward.

== Teams ==
- (Uruguay) Tacuarembó 2011–2015
- (Brazil) Galícia Esporte Clube 2014 (loan)
- (Chile) San Marcos de Arica 2015–2016
- (El Salvador) Águila 2016–2017
- (Uruguay) Tacuarembó 2017
- (El Salvador) Sonsonate 2017–2018
- (El Salvador) Isidro Metapán 2018–2019
