= Carlos Bueno =

Uruguayan footballer (born 1980)

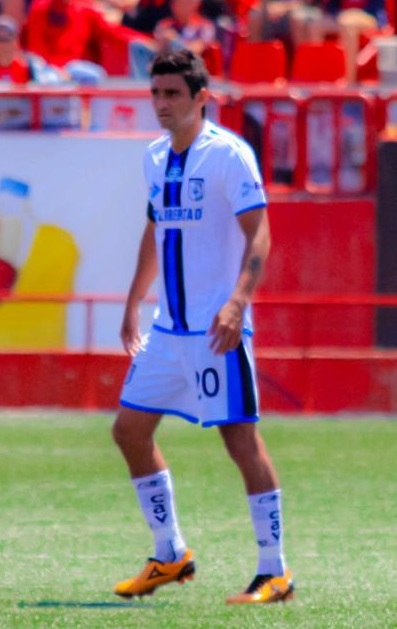
- Bueno playing for Querétaro in 2011

Personal information
- Full name: Carlos Heber Bueno Suárez
- Date of birth: 10 May 1980 (age 46)
- Place of birth: Artigas, Uruguay
- Height: 1.78 m (5 ft 10 in)
- Position: Striker

Team information
- Current team: Artigas

Youth career
- Peñarol

Senior career*
Years	Team	Apps	(Gls)
1999–2005	Peñarol	135	(73)
2005–2007	Paris Saint-Germain	12	(0)
2006–2007	→ Sporting CP (loan)	14	(4)
2007	Boca Juniors	9	(1)
2008–2010	Peñarol	35	(17)
2009–2010	→ Real Sociedad (loan)	33	(12)
2010	Universidad de Chile	15	(7)
2011–2012	Querétaro	48	(23)
2012	→ San Lorenzo (loan)	15	(6)
2013	Universidad Católica	12	(5)
2013–2014	Belgrano	29	(3)
2014–2015	San Martín San Juan	30	(7)
2016	Sarmiento	5	(3)
2016	Argentinos Juniors	8	(2)
2016	Liverpool Montevideo	14	(4)
2017	Santa Tecla	19	(6)
2018–2019	Cerro Largo	25	(7)
2020–	Artigas		
Total		458	(180)

International career
2003–2008	Uruguay	24	(13)
- * Club domestic league appearances and goals as of 6 December 2019

Carlos Heber Bueno Suárez (born 10 May 1980) is a Uruguayan professional footballer who plays for Artigas F.C. as a striker.

== Club career ==
Born in Artigas, Artigas Department, Bueno started his career at C.A. Peñarol. He moved abroad in 2005, signing for French club Paris Saint-Germain F.C. and being rarely used during the season.

In July 2006, Bueno was loaned to Sporting CP. His biggest moment of the campaign occurred when he scored four goals (all of his Primeira Liga ones) in 20 minutes in a match against C.D. Nacional on 3 February 2007 – the Lisbon side won 5–1, and the player was just featured in the final thirty minutes.

In August 2007, PSG sold Bueno to Argentina's Boca Juniors, where he played until the end of 2007, returning to Peñarol early in the following year. For 2009–10 he moved to Real Sociedad in the Spanish second division, following the departure of countryman Sebastián Abreu who left for Aris Thessaloniki FC; on 5 June 2010 he scored a hat-trick in a 3–1 win at Cádiz CF, as they eventually returned to La Liga after an absence of three years, as league champions.

In August 2010, Bueno moved to Club Universidad de Chile, making his debut against Municipal Iquique in a 2–0 away success which qualified for the Copa Sudamericana. On the 15th he scored his first goal for the team, against Everton de Viña del Mar in a 5–1 triumph (also away), coming off the bench at Estadio Francisco Sánchez Rumoroso in Coquimbo; nine days later he also found the net against Oriente Petrolero of Bolivia, in a 2–2 home draw and 2–3 aggregate loss.

In early December 2010, Bueno agreed to join Querétaro F.C. after playing for Universidad in the qualifying rounds for the following year's Copa Libertadores. However, his agent denied any transfer had occurred by saying that the player would respect his contract until 2012, but he finally signed a three-year deal with the Mexican club.

After leaving the Estadio Corregidora in late 2012 at the age of 32, Bueno went on to represent in quick succession Club Deportivo Universidad Católica, Club Atlético Belgrano, San Martín de San Juan, Club Atlético Sarmiento, Argentinos Juniors (all four in the Argentine Primera División), Liverpool F.C. (Montevideo) and Santa Tecla FC. He retired in May 2017, after four months with the latter club.

Bueno came out of his short-lived retirement in February 2018, with the 37-year-old signing with Uruguayan Segunda División's Cerro Largo FC. He scored twice in his debut, helping the hosts defeat Miramar Misiones 4–0. In 2020, he began playing for Artigas F.C. in his hometown Artigas. He is son of Eber Bueno, former uruguayan footballer.

== International career ==
Bueno's debut for Uruguay came against Argentina on 16 July 2003, in a 2–2 draw played in La Plata. Subsequently, he played for the national team in the 2004 Copa América, scoring three goals in four matches.

== Career statistics ==
=== International ===
Appearances and goals by national team and year
National team	Year	Apps	Goals
Uruguay	2003	7	3
Uruguay	2004	7	4
Uruguay	2005	0	0
Uruguay	2006	0	0
Uruguay	2007	4	3
Uruguay	2008	6	3
Total		24	13

Scores and results list Uruguay's goal tally first, score column indicates score after each Bueno goal.

List of international goals scored by Carlos Bueno
No	Date	Venue	Opponent	Score	Result	Competition
1.	15 August 2003	Azadi, Tehran, Iran	Iraq	3–1	5–1	2003 LG Cup
2.	15 August 2003	Azadi, Tehran, Iran	Iraq	4–1	5–1	2003 LG Cup
3.	7 September 2003	Centenario, Montevideo, Uruguay	Bolivia	5–0	5–0	2006 World Cup qualification
4.	7 July 2004	Elías Aguirre, Chiclayo, Peru	Mexico	1–0	2–2	2004 Copa América
5.	10 July 2004	Elías Aguirre, Chiclayo, Peru	Ecuador	2–1	2–1	2004 Copa América
6.	18 July 2004	Jorge Basadre, Tacna, Peru	Paraguay	1–1	3–1	2004 Copa América
7.	5 September 2004	Centenario, Montevideo, Uruguay	Ecuador	1–0	1–0	2006 World Cup qualification
8.	24 March 2007	World Cup Stadium, Seoul, South Korea	South Korea	1–0	2–0	Friendly
9.	24 March 2007	World Cup Stadium, Seoul, South Korea	South Korea	2–0	2–0	Friendly
10.	13 October 2007	Centenario, Montevideo, Uruguay	Bolivia	5–0	5–0	2010 World Cup qualification
11.	17 June 2008	Centenario, Montevideo, Uruguay	Peru	4–0	6–0	2010 World Cup qualification
12.	17 June 2008	Centenario, Montevideo, Uruguay	Peru	5–0	6–0	2010 World Cup qualification
13.	14 October 2008	Hernando Siles, La Paz, Bolivia	Bolivia	1–2	2–2	2010 World Cup qualification

== Honours ==
Peñarol

- Uruguayan Primera División: 1999, 2003

Paris Saint-Germain

- Coupe de France: 2005–06

Sporting

- Taça de Portugal: 2006–07

Real Sociedad

- Segunda División: 2009–10

Santa Tecla

- Salvadoran Primera División: 2016–17
