= Itacaré (footballer) =

Brazilian footballer (born 1987)

Personal information
- Full name: Elison Fagundes dos Santos
- Date of birth: August 21, 1987 (age 39)
- Place of birth: Itacaré-BA, Brazil
- Height: 1.81 m (5 ft 11 in)
- Position: Striker

Youth career
- 2005: Vitória

Senior career*
Years	Team	Apps	(Gls)
2005–2009	Vitória		
2007	→ Consadole Sapporo (loan)		
2008	→ Tupi (loan)		
2008	→ Oriente Petrolero (loan)		
2009	→ Ipitanga Bahia (loan)		
2010	Americano		
2010	Fluminense de Feira		
2010	Bahia		
2011	Novo Hamburgo		
2011	Fortaleza		
2011–2012	Al Hala Club		
2012	Corinthians Alagoano		
2012	Juazeirense		
2013	Itumbiara		
2014	CSE		
2015	Serrano		
2015	Resende		
2016	Monte Azul		
2016–2017	UES	4	(0)
2018	Central		
- * Club domestic league appearances and goals

Elison Fagundes dos Santos (born August 21, 1987), or simply Itacaré, is a Brazilian football striker.

== Club career ==
In 2016, dos Santos signed with UES of the Salvadoran Primera División, but had few opportunities to play with the scarlet team and left the club months later in the middle of an administrative and economic crisis.
