= Marlón Cornejo =

Salvadoran football player (born 1993)

Personal information
- Full name: Marlón Iván Cornejo Rivas
- Date of birth: 14 September 1993 (age 33)
- Place of birth: San Salvador, El Salvador
- Height: 1.74 m (5 ft 9 in)
- Position: Left midfielder

Team information
- Current team: Platense

Youth career
- 2011–2013: ADET

Senior career*
Years	Team	Apps	(Gls)
2013	CD Vendaval		
2014	Real Destroyer		
2014–2018	Santa Tecla FC	136	(28)
2018–2019	Alianza FC	31	(4)
2019–2020	Municipal Limeño	2	(0)
2020–2022	Santa Tecla FC	62	(4)
2022–2023	Isidro Metapan	23	(1)
2023–	Platense	53	(2)

International career^{‡}
2015–	El Salvador	1	(0)
- * Club domestic league appearances and goals as of 16 October 2024 ‡ National team caps and goals as of 16 October 2024

Marlón Cornejo (born 14 September 1993) is a Salvadoran professional footballer who plays as a midfielder. Cornejo currently plays for Platense in the Primera division of El salvador.

== Club career ==
Cornejo signed with Alianza for the Clausura 2018 tournament, showing a great level in matches. One of his most prominent games was an Apertura 2018 tournament match against Chalatenango, Cornejo scored the only goal of the game in an away victory (0–1).

== Honours ==
- Santa Tecla
  - Primera División (1): Clausura 2015
