= Edgardo Malvestiti =

Argentine footballer and manager

Personal information
- Date of birth: 2 May 1967 (age 59)
- Place of birth: Buenos Aires, Argentina
- Position: Striker

Senior career*
Years	Team	Apps	(Gls)
- Newell's Old Boys
- Central Córdoba de Rosario

Managerial career
- 1996–2001: Newell's Old Boys (youth)
- 2003: Sportivo San Martín
- 2004–2005: Club Blooming (assistant)
- 2006: San Martín de San Juan (assistant)
- 2007: Club Blooming (assistant)
- 2008: Club Bolívar (assistant)
- 2009: Oriente Petrolero (assistant)
- 2009: Sportivo San Martín
- 2010: Sportivo Las Parejas
- 2011–2012: Club Blooming
- 2013: Sport Boys Warnes
- 2013-2014: San Simón
- 2014: Oriente Petrolero (assistant)
- 2015–2016: Nacional Potosí
- 2016: Águila
- 2017: Club Real Potosí
- 2017: Universitario de Sucre
- 2018: Nacional Potosí
- 2020: Newell's Old Boys (youth)
- 2021: Newell's Old Boys (assistant)
- 2022: Central Córdoba de Rosario
- 2023: Cantolao
- 2023–2024: Churchill Brothers
- * Club domestic league appearances and goals

Edgardo Malvestiti (born 2 May 1967) is an Argentine football manager and former player who played as a striker.

== Career ==
Malvestiti played club football for Central Córdoba de Rosario. He was part of Central Córdoba's side that won the 1990–91 Primera B Metropolitana. The following season he made 21 appearances in the Primera B Nacional.

After twelve years as a football player, El Chueco Malvestiti became a football manager. He managed clubs throughout the Americas, with stops in Argentina, Bolivia, El Salvador and Peru. Malvestiti managed Bolivian side Universitario de Sucre in 2017. In 2020, he returned to the club where he began his playing career, Newell's Old Boys, to coach the youth team. Malvestiti became assistant manager for Newell's senior side in 2021.

On 29 June 2023, Indian second-tier club Churchill Brothers signed Malvestiti ahead of the 2023–24 season.
