= William Maldonado =

Salvadoran footballer (born 1990)

Personal information
- Full name: William Antonio Maldonado López
- Date of birth: January 3, 1990 (age 36)
- Place of birth: Santa Ana, El Salvador
- Height: 1.74 m (5 ft 9 in)
- Position: Midfielder

Youth career
- 1997–1999: Academia Cuscachapa
- 2000–2005: Promesas FAS
- 2005–2007: Fundación La Chelona

Senior career*
Years	Team	Apps	(Gls)
2007–2008	San Salvador		
2008–2011	FAS		
2011–2017	Santa Tecla		
2017–2018	FAS	49	(7)
2018–2019	Jocoro		
2019–2020	Sonsonate		

International career
2006–2007	El Salvador U17		
2008	El Salvador U20	5	(2)
2007–	El Salvador	1	(0)
- * Club domestic league appearances and goals

William Antonio Maldonado López (born January 3, 1990) is a Salvadoran professional footballer, who plays as a midfielder.

== Club career ==
=== San Salvador FC ===
Maldonado's professional career began on July 3, 2007 when he signed a contract with now defunct Salvadoran national league club, San Salvador FC. He was one of six players from the El Salvador U17 national team, that would sign for San Salvador that season. The others were Ricardo Orellana, Diego Chavarría, Xavier García, Óscar Arroyo and Fabricio Alfaro.

He first gained the attention of league teams as a member of the 2006–2007 El Salvador U17 national team, where he showed a lot of potential, with his creative passing, speed and exceptional free kicks.

He made his professional debut on September 23, 2007, in a league match against Alianza, and scored his first goal on October 7 that same year in a match against FAS. His second goal came four months later on February 20 in a 2–2 away draw against Chalatenango.

=== Return to FAS ===
In May 2017, Maldonado signed again with FAS for the Apertura 2017. With FAS, Maldonado reached the semi-finals of the Apertura 2018, but they were defeated by Alianza.

In December 2018, FAS did not renew Maldonado's contract.

== International career ==
Maldonado made his debut, aged only 17, for El Salvador in a November 2007 friendly match against Jamaica, coming on as a late sub for Shawn Martin. The match has been his only senior international so far.

== Career statistics ==
=== Club ===
As of March 19, 2017.

Club	Season	League		League Cup		Continental		Other		Total	
Club	Season	Apps	Goals	Apps	Goals	Apps	Goals	Apps	Goals	Apps	Goals
San Salvador	Apertura 2007	8	1	–		0	0	0	0	8	1
San Salvador	Clausura 2008	15	1	–		0	0	0	0	15	1
FAS	Apertura 2008	6	0	–		0	0	0	0	6	0
FAS	Clausura 2009	1	0	–		0	0	0	0	1	0
Career total		30	2	–		0	0	0	0	30	2

== Honours ==
- Santa Tecla
  - Primera División (1): Clausura 2015
