= Kevin Santamaría =

Salvadoran footballer (born 1991)

Personal information
- Full name: Kevin Oswaldo Santamaría Guzmán
- Date of birth: January 11, 1991 (age 35)
- Place of birth: Santa Tecla, El Salvador
- Height: 1.73 m (5 ft 8 in)
- Position: Midfielder

Team information
- Current team: FAS

Senior career*
Years	Team	Apps	(Gls)
2007–2008	Estudiantes FC		
2008	CD UES		
2009	Malacoff		
2009	Turín FESA		
2010	Nejapa		
2010	Isidro Metapán		
2011	Once Municipal		
2011–2012	UES	28	(4)
2012–2013	Santa Tecla	48	(15)
2014	Suchitepéquez	22	(7)
2014–2017	Municipal	40	(6)
2017–2018	Suchitepéquez	35	(7)
2018–2019	Santa Tecla	44	(7)
2019–2020	Deportivo Iztapa	20	(1)
2020-2020	Deportivo Llacuabamba	19	(6)
2021	Sport Chavelines Juniors	21	(3)
2022–2023	CD Aguila	37	(13)
2023–2024	Comerciantes Unidos	37	(7)
2024	Deportivo Llacuabamba	4	(0)
2025–Present	FAS		

International career^{‡}
2013–	El Salvador	22	(1)
- * Club domestic league appearances and goals ‡ National team caps and goals as of 5 September 2024

Kevin Oswaldo Santamaría Guzmán (born 11 January 1991) is a Salvadoran professional footballer who plays as a midfielder for FAS and El Salvador national team.

== Club career ==
Santamaría has been switching teams every season from his debut at Estudiantes in 2007 until signing up with UES in 2011. In December 2013 he signed with Guatemalan club Suchitepéquez for one year. After having success at the club he signed with Municipal on May 25, 2013 on a one-year contract.

=== Santa Tecla ===
Santamaría signed with Santa Tecla for the Apertura 2012.

=== Return to Santa Tecla ===
Santamaría signed with Santa Tecla F.C. again for the Apertura 2018. He reached the semi-finals of that tournament, after defeating Municipal Limeño 3–2 on aggregate.

== International career ==
Santamaría made his senior national team debut in a friendly 2-1 loss versus Venezuela. He was a member of the 2013 Gold Cup squad and made three appearances in the tournament.

== Honours ==
=== Club ===
Santa Tecla F.C.

- Primera División
  - Champion (1): Apertura 2018

Comerciantes Unidos

- Peruvian Segunda División
  - Champion (1): 2023 Liga 2 (Peru)
