= Facundo Simioli =

Argentine footballer

Personal information
- Full name: Facundo Nicolás Simioli
- Date of birth: 7 April 1988 (age 38)
- Place of birth: Buenos Aires, Argentina
- Height: 1.80 m (5 ft 11 in)
- Position: Defender

Youth career
- 2005-2006: Vélez Sarsfield
- 2007–2009: San Lorenzo

Senior career*
Years	Team	Apps	(Gls)
2010	Sport Club Pacífico		
2011–2014	Santa Tecla		
2014–2016	Atlético Fénix		
2016–2017	FAS		
- * Club domestic league appearances and goals

Facundo Nicolás Simioli (born 7 April 1988) is an Argentinian former professional footballer who played as a defender.

He lives in San Antonio de Areco, Buenos Aires. Simioli played 83 matches and scored 13 goals with Santa Tecla in the Primera División de Fútbol de El Salvador.
