= Juan Barahona (footballer) =

Salvadoran footballer (born 1996)

Personal information
- Full name: Juan Alfredo Barahona Peña
- Date of birth: 12 February 1996 (age 30)
- Place of birth: San Salvador, El Salvador
- Height: 1.72 m (5 ft 7 1/2 in)
- Position: Defender

Team information
- Current team: Alianza

Youth career
- 2009–2010: Turín FESA
- 2010–2011: Pachuca
- 2011–2014: Turín FESA

Senior career*
| Years | Team | Apps | (Gls) |
| 2014–2019 | Santa Tecla | 170 | (21) |
| 2019–2020 | Sacramento Republic | 22 | (0) |
| 2020–2021 | Isidro Metapán | 25 | (4) |
| 2021 | Santa Tecla | 14 | (1) |
| 2021–2022 | Platense | 31 | (5) |
| 2022–2023 | Aguila | 26 | (0) |
| 2024 | FAS | 15 | (0) |
| 2025– | Alianza | 15 | (0) |

International career
| 2012 | El Salvador U-17 | | |
| 2014–2015 | El Salvador U-20 | | |
| 2014 | El Salvador U-21 | | |
| 2014–2024 | El Salvador | 23 | (1) |
- * Club domestic league appearances and goals

Juan Alfredo Barahona Peña (born 12 February 1996) is a Salvadoran professional footballer, who plays as a defender.

== Club career ==
=== Santa Tecla ===
Barahona signed with Santa Tecla in 2014. On 9 December 2018, he scored in the 2–0 victory against Águila in the second leg of the semi-finals of the Apertura 2018.

=== Sacramento Republic FC ===
Barahona signed with Sacramento Republic on 6 May 2019.

== Honours ==
Santa Tecla

- Primera División: Clausura 2015, Apertura 2016, Clausura 2017, Apertura 2018

== International goals ==
Scores and results list El Salvador's goal tally first.

| Goal | Date | Venue | Opponent | Score | Result | Competition |
|---|---|---|---|---|---|---|
| 1. | 17 January 2017 | Estadio Rommel Fernández, Panama City, Panama | Belize | 2–0 | 3–1 | 2017 Copa Centroamericana |
