= Gilberto Baires =

Salvadoran footballer (born 1990)

Personal information
- Full name: Gilberto Arnulfo Baires Hernández
- Date of birth: April 1, 1990 (age 36)
- Place of birth: La Paz, El Salvador
- Height: 1.64 m (5 ft 5 in)
- Position: Midfielder

Youth career
- 2004–2006: Escuelas del Atlético Marte

Senior career*
Years	Team	Apps	(Gls)
2007–2013	CD Atlético Marte		
2013–2015	CD Águila	70	
2016–2020	Santa Tecla FC	113	(14)
2020	CD Águila		
2020	Once Deportivo	28	
2021	Platense		
2022	Santa Tecla FC		
2023	Municipal Limeño		
2024-2025	Platense		

International career^{‡}
2005	El Salvador U15		
2007	El Salvador U17		
2008–2009	El Salvador U20		
2011–	El Salvador	13	(1)
- * Club domestic league appearances and goals ‡ National team caps and goals as of 13 October 2018

Gilberto Arnulfo Baires Hernández (born April 1, 1990) is a Salvadoran professional soccer player who plays as a midfielder.

== Club career ==
Baires came through the youth ranks at Atlético Marte, and made his professional debut in 2007.

== International career ==
Baires made his debut for El Salvador in a January 2011 UNCAF Nations Cup match against Belize and has, as of January 2012, earned a total of 9 caps, scoring no goals. He has represented his country at the 2011 UNCAF Nations Cup, as well as at the 2011 CONCACAF Gold Cup.

== Career statistics ==
Scores and results list El Salvador's goal tally first.

No.	Date	Venue	Opponent	Score	Result	Competition
1.	13 October 2018	Estadio Cuscatlán, San Salvador, El Salvador	Barbados	2–0	3–0	2019–20 CONCACAF Nations League qualification
