= Bryan Tamacas =

Salvadoran footballer (born 1995)

Personal information
- Full name: Bryan Alexander Tamacas López
- Date of birth: 21 February 1995 (age 31)
- Place of birth: San Salvador, El Salvador
- Height: 1.75 m (5 ft 9 in)
- Position: Right-back

Team information
- Current team: Alianza
- Number: 21

Senior career*
Years	Team	Apps	(Gls)
2011–2012	Marte Soyapango		
2013–2014	FAS	39	(0)
2015–2018	Santa Tecla	146	(7)
2019	Sportivo Luqueño	3	(0)
2019–2020	Santa Tecla	7	(1)
2020–2023	Alianza	72	(8)
2023–2024	Oakland Roots	43	(2)
2024–2025	FAS	25	(0)
2025–2026	Hércules	10	(1)
2026-	Alianza	3	(0)

International career^{‡}
- El Salvador U17
2015	El Salvador U20	6	(0)
2016–	El Salvador	87	(3)
- * Club domestic league appearances and goals as of 22 October 2023 ‡ National team caps and goals as of 25 March 2022

Bryan Alexander Tamacas López (born 21 February 1995) is a Salvadoran professional footballer who plays as a defender for Salvadoran Primera Division club Hércules and the El Salvador national team.

== International career ==
=== Youth ===
Tamacas has played for El Salvador at the under-17, under-20 and under-21 levels.

=== Senior ===
Tamacas made his international debut for El Salvador he started and played 86 minute in a friendly match against the Armenia on 1 June 2016. At the 2021 Gold Cup, he won the Fighting Spirit Award for an incredible assist he made in the game of El Salvador vs Qatar.

== Honours ==
Santa Tecla

- Primera División: Clausura 2015, Apertura 2016, Clausura 2017

El Salvador

- Fighting Spirit Award: 2021 CONCACAF Gold Cup

== Career statistics ==
=== Club ===
As of 18 May 2025

Club	Division	League			Cup		Continental		Total	
Club	Division	Season	Apps	Goals	Apps	Goals	Apps	Goals	Apps	Goals
FAS	Salvadorian Primera División	2013–14	26	0	—		—		26	0
FAS	Salvadorian Primera División	2014–15	13	0	—		—		13	0
FAS	Total		39	0	0	0	0	0	39	0
Santa Tecla	Salvadorian Primera División	2014–15	7	1	—		—		7	1
Santa Tecla	Salvadorian Primera División	2015–16	33	1	—		—		33	1
Santa Tecla	Salvadorian Primera División	2016–17	43	1	—		—		43	1
Santa Tecla	Salvadorian Primera División	2017–18	41	3	—		2	0	43	3
Santa Tecla	Salvadorian Primera División	2018–19	22	1	—		2	0	24	1
Santa Tecla	Total		146	7	0	0	4	0	150	7
Sportivo Luqueño	Paraguayan Primera División	2019	3	0	—		—		3	0
Santa Tecla	Salvadorian Primera División	2019–20	7	1	—		2	0	9	1
Alianza	Salvadorian Primera División	2020–21	37	5	—		1	0	38	5
Alianza	Salvadorian Primera División	2021–22	27	3	—		2	0	29	3
Alianza	Salvadorian Primera División	2022–23	8	0	—		4	0	12	0
Alianza	Total		72	8	0	0	7	0	79	8
Oakland Roots	USL Championship	2023	23	1	2	0	—		25	1
Oakland Roots	USL Championship	2024	17	1	1	0	—		18	1
Oakland Roots	Total		40	2	3	0	0	0	43	2
FAS	Salvadorian Primera División	2024–25	25	0	—		—		25	0
Career total			332	18	3	0	13	0	348	18

=== International goals ===
Scores and results list El Salvador's goal tally first.

No.	Date	Venue	Opponent	Score	Result	Competition
1.	7 March 2019	Banc of California Stadium, Los Angeles, United States	Guatemala	3–0	3–1	Friendly
