= 2025–26 Primera División de El Salvador =

Primera División tournament

Primera División de El Salvador
- Season: 2025–26
- Dates: 19 July 2025 – 20 December 2025 (Apertura), 17 January 2026 – 23 May 2026 (Clausura)
- Champions: LA Firpo (2025 Apertura); FAS (Clausura 2026)
- Promoted: TBD
- Relegated: Zacatecoluca F.C.
- CONCACAF Central American Cup: LA Firpo
- CONCACAF Central American Cup: FAS
- CONCACAF Central American Cup: Alianza
- Top goalscorer: (El Salvador) Juan Carlos Argueta (12 goals Apertura 2025) (El Salvador) Emerson Mauricio (15 goals Clausura 2026)
- Best goalkeeper: (El Salvador) Cristopher Rauda (Apertura 2025) (El Salvador) Kevin Carabantes (Clausura 2026)
- Biggest home win: TBD 3-4 TBD
- Biggest away win: TBD 3-4 TBD
- Highest scoring: TBD 3-4 TBD
- All statistics correct as of 15 May 2025.

The 2025–26 Primera División de El Salvador, also known as the Liga Pepsi, was the 27th season and 52nd and 53rc Primera División tournament, El Salvador's top football division, since its establishment of an Apertura and Clausura format. Hercules (Formerly Once Deportivo) and Alianza are the defending champions of the Apertura and Clausura tournament respectively. The league will consist of 12 teams. There will be two seasons conducted under identical rules, with each team playing a home and away game against the other clubs for a total of 22 games per tournament. At the end of each half-season tournament, the top six teams in that tournament's regular season standings will take part in the playoffs.

The champions of Apertura and Clausura will qualify for the CONCACAF Central American Cup, the third team to qualify is the team with better aggregate record. Should the same team win both tournaments, both runners-up will qualify for CONCACAF Central American Cup. Should the final of both tournaments features the same two teams, the semi-finalist with the better aggregate record will qualify for CONCACAF Central American Cup.

== Teams ==
=== Promotion and relegation ===
A total of 12 teams will contest the league, including 11 sides from the 2024–25 Primera División and 1 promoted from the 2024–25 Segunda División.

Zacatecoluca F.C. was promoted to the Primera División on May 17, 2025, after defeating Fuerte Aguilares for both the Apertura 2024 and Clausura 2025 titles.

It was announced that due to league only having 11 teams, no teams would be relegated to the Segunda División .

Due to a mix of banning multi-club ownership and poor attendance Once Deportivo de Ahuachapan announced they would be handing their spot in the primera division to a new club.

On May 9, 2025 It was announced that the historic club Hercules was would be taking over Once Deportivo spot in the Primera division in the Apertura 2025.

On May 31, It was announced that Inter Formando un Atleta had purchased Dragon in the Primera Division in the Apertura 2025.

=== Personnel and sponsoring ===
Team	Chairman	Head Coach	Captain	Kitmaker	Shirt Sponsors
Aguila	(El Salvador) Rigoberto Ortiz Ostorga	(Mexico) Juan Carlos Chávez	(El Salvador) Darwin Cerén	Umbro	Pollo Campestre, Claro, Pepsi, Abank,
Alianza	(El Salvador) Gonzalo Sibrian	(Argentina) Ernesto Corti	(El Salvador) Henry Romero	Umbro	Mister Donut, Claro, Pepsi, Indupalma, Gatorade, Cementos Progreso, ABANK, Ganaplay, Taqueritos
Cacahuatique	(El Salvador) Juan Amaya	(Uruguay) Pablo Quiñones	(El Salvador) Reinaldo Aparicio	Tony Sports	Pollo Campestre, Acacob, Flynet, AGM sport inc, GanaPlay, Ciudad Barrios, Electrolit
Fuerte San Francisco	(El Salvador) Ismael Guzmán	(Argentina) Daniel Corti	(El Salvador) Wilson Rugamas	Tony Sports	Torque Digital, Padilla, betpro,
FAS	(El Salvador) José Sincuir	(Mexico) Cristian Flores	(El Salvador) Rudy Clavel	Umbro	Cementos Fortaleza, Volaris, VLRM Markets
Firpo	(El Salvador) Ronny Hernández	(Costa Rica) Marvin Solano Abarca	(El Salvador) Lizandro Claros	Salguero	Cablesat, Arte Cerveza, Diagri, Roxy, Empresa Agricola Jesus Grande, Gana777, La Pirraya, Canal 4
Hércules	(El Salvador) Giancarlo Angelucci	(Argentina) Gabriel Alvarez	(El Salvador) Cesar Flores	Macron	Pepsi, Mister Donut, Canal 4, Gatorade, Alcasa, Dale.sv
Inter FA	(El Salvador) Martin Herrera	(El Salvador) William Renderos	(El Salvador) Rubén Marroquín	Maca	Betpro, Make, Electrolit,
Isidro Metapán	(El Salvador) Alberto Rivera	(El Salvador) Erick Prado	(El Salvador) Milton Molina	Elite Sports	Holcim, Geniusbet, Bemisal, El Indio, Taller Polas
Limeño	(El Salvador) Eduardo Chávez	(El Salvador) Jose Romero	(El Salvador) Fredy Espinoza	Tony Sports	Universidad Dr ANdres Bello, Genius Bet, CAMSEB, MonteCalvaro, Agua El Limon, san Rafael,
Platense	(El Salvador) Carlos Burgos	(Peru) Agustin Castillo	(El Salvador) Xavier Garcia	Tony Sports	Pollo Campestre, GanaPlay, Renosa, Tecnuveg, Ticketon, Sudagrip, Electrolit, Caja Credito Zacatecoluca
Zacatecoluca	(El Salvador) Alfredo Deras	(El Salvador) Nelson Ancheta	(El Salvador) Gerson Mayen	Galaxia	Comercial Deras, El Sabor Casero, Electrolit, Ury store, Analiza fisoterapa, Blue Bistro, Comercial Tobar, Betpro, Commercial Bliss, Creadisena, Transporte Palacios

== Notable events ==
=== Aguila announced to play in a different stadium ===
It was announced on July 15, 2025 that Aguila will be playing its game for Apertura 2025 season in the Estadio Cuscatlan, this is due for major renovation needed to be done to allow any sports to play.

=== Zacatecoluca FC moves home games to San Salvador ===
On the 6th of December, 2025 the new owners of Zacatecoluca FC, Colombian Élite Field Holdings ownership, announced that the team will be moving to San Salvador, the club will play in the Estadio Cuscatlan.

=== Notable death from Apertura 2025 season and 2026 Clausura season ===
The following people associated with the Primera Division have died between the middle of 2024 and middle of 2025.

- Juan Ramón Verón (ex Argentinian Alianza player)
- Horacio Díaz Luco (ex Chilean Aguila player)
- Francisco Israel Acevedo Orantes (ex Platense player)
- Erick Corrales (ex Costa Rican Nejapa player)
- René Andrés Ubau (ex Chalatenango player)
- Julio Cesar Cortes (ex Uruguayan Alianza player and Aguila coach)
- Carlos Che Sanchez (ex Argentinian TBD player)
- Carlos Prieto (ex Alianza, Sonsonate and Atletico Marte player)
- Jaime Rodríguez (ex Alianza, FAS, and NEIN player and ex Alianza and San Salvador FC coach)
- Tony Maravilla (ex Platense and Cacahuatique player)
- Efraín Santander (ex Chilean Excelsior player)
- TBD (ex TBD player)

== Managerial changes ==
=== Before the start of the season ===
Team	Outgoing manager	Manner of departure	Date of vacancy	Replaced by	Date of appointment	Position in table
Firpo	(Argentina) Gabriel Álvarez	Resigned	May 13, 2025	(Costa Rica) Marvin Solano Abarca	June 6, 2024	2nd and Quarter-Finalist (2025 Clausura)
FAS	(Spain) David Caneda	Resigned, Returned to role as Sporting Manager	18 May 2025	(Mexico) Cristian Flores	6 June 2025	8th and Semi-Finalist (2025 Clausura)
Hercules	None'	New Club	None'	(Argentina) Gabriel Alvarez	May 26, 2025	None (2025 Clausura)
Zacatecoluca	(El Salvador) Edgar Henriquez	Mutual Consent	May 30, 2025	(El Salvador) Nelson Ancheta	June 1, 2025	None (Promoted) (2025 Clausura)
Fuerte San Francisco	(El Salvador) Rolando Torres	Interimship finished	May 26, 2025	(Argentina) Daniel Corti	May 28, 2025	7th and Semi-finalist (2025 Clausura)
Cacahuatique	(El Salvador) Victor Coreas	Mutual Consent	May 31, 2025	(Uruguay) Pablo Quiñones	June 1, 2025	None (2025 Clausura)
Platense	(El Salvador) David Hernandez	Moved to become assistant coach	June 10, 2025	(Peru) Agustin Castillo	June 10, 2025	9th and did not qualify (2025 Clausura)
Inter FA	None'	New Club	None	(El Salvador) William Renderos	June 13, 2025	None (2025 Clausura)

=== During the Apertura season ===
Team	Outgoing manager	Manner of departure	Date of vacancy	Replaced by	Date of appointment	Position in table
Isidro Metapan	(El Salvador) Erick Prado	Sacked	August, 2025	(El Salvador) Edwin Portillo (Interim)	August, 2025	7th (2025 Apertura)
Municipal Limeño	(El Salvador) Jose Romero []	Mutual Consent	August 2025	(El Salvador) Saul Prucedino (Interim)	September 2025	7th (2025 Apertura)
Inter FA	(El Salvador) William Renderos	Mutual Consent	September 2025	(Argentina) Horacio Lugo (Interim)	September 2025	9th (2025 Apertura)
Isidro Metapan	(El Salvador) Edwin Portillo (Interim)	Moved to be Assistant coach	September, 2025	(El Salvador) Efrain Burgos	September, 2025	7th (2025 Apertura)
Inter FA	(Argentina) Horacio Lugo	Returned back to Sporting Director role	September 12, 2025	(Costa Rica) Luis Marin	September 12, 2025	11th (2025 Apertura)
Fuerte San Francisco	(Argentina) Daniel Corti	Mutual Consent	September 18, 2025	(El Salvador) Rolando Torres	September 18, 2025	9th (2025 Apertura)
Municipal Limeño	(El Salvador) Saul Prucedino	Interimship finished, moved back as Under 17 coach	September 18, 2025	(El Salvador) Jorge Rodriguez	September 18, 2025	th (2025 Apertura)
Aguila	(Argentina) Daniel Messina	Resigned	September 26, 2025	(El Salvador) Sergio Iván Muñoz (Interim)	September 2025	8th (2025 Apertura)
Aguila	(El Salvador) Sergio Iván Muñoz	Returned back as goalkeeping coach	September 29, 2025	(Mexico) Juan Carlos Chávez	September 29, 2025	8th (2025 Apertura)
Zacatecoluca	(El Salvador) Nelson Ancheta	Resigned due to illness	October 2025	(El Salvador) Ivan Ruiz (Interimship)	October, 2025	10th (2025 Apertura)
Hercules	(Argentina) Gabriel Alvarez	Sacked	October 21, 2025	(El Salvador) Francisco Hernandez (Interim)	October 21, 2025	11 th (2025 Apertura)
Hercules	(El Salvador) Francisco Hernandez	Interimship finished, moved back as Assistant coach	October 24, 2025	(Uruguay) Nicolás Dos Santos	October 24, 2025	11 th (2025 Apertura)

=== Between the Apertura and Clausura season ===
Team	Outgoing manager	Manner of departure	Date of vacancy	Replaced by	Date of appointment	Position in table
Zacatecoluca	(El Salvador) Ivan Ruiz []	Interimship finished	December 2025	(El Salvador) Chepe Martínez	December 28, 2025	10th (2025 Apertura)
FAS	(Mexico) Cristian Flores	Resigned	December 8, 2025	(Mexico) Adrián Sánchez	December 12, 2025	2nd and Quarterfinalist (2025 Apertura)
Hércules	(Uruguay) Nicolas dos Santos	Resigned Personal issues	December 9, 2025	(Argentina) Daniel Corti	December 10, 2025	11th (2025 Apertura)
Cacahuatique	(Uruguay) Pablo Quiñones	Mutual Consent	December 2025	(Argentina) Ángel “Nino” Piazzi	January 6, 2025	7th and Semifinalist (2025 Apertura)

=== During the Apertura season ===
Team	Outgoing manager	Manner of departure	Date of vacancy	Replaced by	Date of appointment	Position in table
Zacatecoluca	(El Salvador) Chepe Martínez	Mutual Consent	January __, 2026	(El Salvador) Lazaro Gutierrez (Interim)	January __, 2026	11th (2026 Clausura)
Zacatecoluca	(El Salvador) Lazaro Gutierrez	Interimship ended	February __, 2026	(Colombia) (Spain) Juan Pablo Buch	February __, 2026	11th (2026 Clausura)
Fuerte San Francisco	(El Salvador) Rolando Torres	Sacked	March 2, 2026	(El Salvador) Omar Sevilla	March 2, 2026	10th (2026 Clausura)
Aguila	(Mexico) Juan Carlos Chávez	Sacked	March 24, 2026	(El Salvador) Isaac Zelaya (Interim)	March 24, 2026	th (2026 Clausura)
Zacatecoluca	(Colombia) (Spain) Juan Pablo Buch	Sacked	April __, 2026	(El Salvador) Lazaro Gutirrez	April __, 2026	11th (2026 Clausura)
Isidro Metapan	(El Salvador) Efraín Burgos	Sacked	April 8, 2026	(El Salvador) Héctor Omar Mejía (Interim)	April 8, 2026	7th (2026 Clausura)
Aguila	(El Salvador) Isaac Zelaya	Interimship Finished	April 11, 2026	(Argentina) Santiago Davio	April 11, 2026	th (2026 Clausura)
Alianza	(Argentina) Ernesto Corti	Resigned	May 8, 2026	(El Salvador) Marcos Portillo (Interim)	May 8, 2026	th (2026 Clausura)

== Apertura ==
=== League table ===
Pos	Team	Pld	W	D	L	GF	GA	GD	Pts	Qualification or relegation
1	Luis Ángel Firpo (Q)	22	15	5	2	49	26	+23	50	Advance to Playoffs
2	FAS (Q)	22	13	5	4	49	25	+24	44	Advance to Playoffs
3	Alianza (Q)	22	13	5	4	37	20	+17	44	Advance to Playoffs
4	Isidro Metapán (Q)	22	10	6	6	31	26	+5	36	Advance to Playoffs
5	Águila (Q)	22	9	6	7	28	26	+2	33	Advance to Playoffs
6	Municipal Limeño (Q)	22	8	4	10	30	32	−2	28	Advance to Playoffs
7	Cacahuatique (Q)	22	7	6	9	28	29	−1	27	Advance to Playoffs
8	Platense (Q)	22	5	11	6	30	27	+3	26	Advance to Playoffs
9	Fuerte San Francisco	22	4	8	10	20	38	−18	20	
10	Zacatecoluca	22	4	6	12	18	28	−10	18	
11	Hércules	22	5	2	15	19	49	−30	17	
12	Inter	22	2	10	10	22	35	−13	16	

Updated to match(es) played on 29 October 2025. Source: Soccerway
Rules for classification: 1) points; 2) goal difference; 3) number of goals scored.
(Q) Qualified for the phase indicated

=== Apertura 2025 Records ===
==== Records ====
- Best home records: FAS (28 points out of 33 points)
- Worst home records: Fuerte San Francisco and Inter FA (7 points out of 33 points)
- Best away records : Alianza (26 points out of 33 points)
- Worst away records : Zacatecoluca and Inter FA (7 points out of 33 points)
- Most goals scored: FAS and Luis Ángel Firpo (49 goals)
- Fewest goals scored: Zacatecoluca (18 goals)
- Fewest goals conceded : Alianza (20 goals)
- Most goals conceded : Hércules (49 goals)

=== Scoring ===
- First goal of the season: (El Salvador) Styen Vasquez for LA Firpo against Municipal Limeno, 6 minutes (19 July 2025)
- First goal by a foreign player: (Brazil) Yan Maciel for FAS against Isidro Metapan, 43rd minutes (19 July 2025)
- Fastest goal in a match: 5 Minutes
  - (El Salvador) TBD for TBD against TBD (Month Day, 2025)
- Goal scored at the latest goal in a match: 98 minutes
  - (Colombia) Luis Peralta goal for Playense against Municipal Limeno (23 July 2025)
- First penalty Kick of the season: (El Salvador) Styen Vasquez for LA Firpo against Municipal Limeno, 6 minutes (19 July 2025)
- Widest winning margin: 8 goals
  - FAS 8-0 Fuerte San Francisco (July 27, 2025)
- First hat-trick of the season: N/A
- First own goal of the season: (El Salvador) TBD (TBD) for TBD (Month Day, 2025)
- Most goals in a match: 8 goals
  - FAS 8-0 Fuerte San Francisco (July 27, 2025)
- Most goals by one team in a match: 8 goals
  - FAS 8-0 Fuerte San Francisco (July 27, 2025)
- Most goals in one half by one team: 4 goals
  - FAS 4-0 (8-0) Fuerte San Francisco (1st half, July 27, 2025)
- Most goals scored by losing team: 2 goals
  - Hercules 2-5 Municipal Limeno (August 2, 2025)
    ** Hercules 2-5 Alianza (August 16, 2025)
    ** FAS 2-3 LA Firpo (September 8, 2025)
- Most goals by one player in a single match: 2 goals
  - (El Salvador) Rafael Tejeda for FAS against Fuerte San Francisco (July 27, 2025)
  - (El Salvador) Isaac Esquivel for Hercules against Municipal Limeno (August 2, 2025)
  - (El Salvador) Luis Tobar for Alianza against Hercules (August 16, 2025)
  - (El Salvador) Styven Vasquez for LA Firpo against Fuerte San Francisco (August 16, 2025)
  - (Colombia) Andres Bello for Platense against Hercules (November 10, 2025)
  - (Colombia) Cristian Gil for LA Firpo against Aguila (November 16, 2025)
  - (El Salvador) Javier Ferman for Municipal Limeno against Cacahuatique (November 16, 2025)
  - (El Salvador) Melvin Alfaro for Zacatecoluca against Inter FA (November 16, 2025)
- Players that scored a hat-trick':
- N/A

==== Top Goalscorer (Apertura 2025) ====
No.	Player	Club	Goals
1	(El Salvador) Juan Carlos Argueta	Cacahuatique	12
2	(Colombia) Jose Correa	Municipal Limeño	11
3	(Trinidad and Tobago) Jomal Williams	Isidro Metapan	9
4	(El Salvador) Emerson Sandoval	Platense	8
5	(El Salvador) Rafael Tejada	FAS	8
6	(Ecuador) [Dany Cetre	Fuerte San Francisco	7
7	(El Salvador) Elias Gumero	LA Firpo	7
8	(Colombia) Andres Bello	Platense	7
9	(El Salvador) Dustin Corea	FAS	7
10	(Colombia) Jhonatan Urrutia	Isidro Metapan	6
11	(El Salvador) Styven Vásquez	LA Firpo	6
12	(El Salvador) Jose Posada	Hércules	6

=== Playoff ===
==== Quarterfinals ====
===== First legs =====
23 November 2025
15:00 (UTC-6)

Cacahuatique	2-3	FAS
Juan Carlos Argueta 13'; Oscar Ceren 16'		Nelson Bonilla 3' 47'; Rafael Tejada 8'

Complejo Chapeltique, Chapeltique
Referee: TBD
23 November 2025
15:00 (UTC-6)

Municipal Limeno	0-0	Alianza
Nil		Nil

Estadio Jose Ramon Flores, Santa Rosa de Lima, La Union
23 November 2025
15:00 (UTC-6)

Platense	0-2	LA Firpo
Nil		Elias Gumero 9'; 80' (pen.)

Estadio Antonio Toledo Valle, Zacatecoluca
Referee: TBD
23 November 2025
17:00 (UTC-6)

Aguila	2-1	Isidro Metapan
Eduardo Cruz 49'; Joel Turcios 74'		Jhonatan Urrutia 3'

Estadio Cuscatlán, San Salvador
Referee: TBD

===== Second legs =====
29 November 2025
19:00 (UTC-6)

Alianza	3-0	Municipal Limeno
Julian Chicas , 35' (o.g.); Alejandro Henriquez 46'; Leonardo Menjivar (pen.), 79'		Nil

Estadio Las Delicias, Santa Tecla

Alianza won 3-0 on Aggregate

29 November 2025
19:00 (UTC-6)

FAS	0-1	Cacahuatique
Nil		Alesson Ferreira 80'

Estadio Óscar Quiteño

1-1. Cacahuatique won 3-1 on penalties

29 November 2025
19:00 (UTC-6)

LA Firpo	6-2	Platense
Diego Ortez 30'; Victor Garcia 38'; Nelson Diaz 53'; Lucas dos Santos 69' 71'; Marvin Aranda 75'		Andres Bello 40'; Emerson Sandoval 42'

Estadio Sergio Torres, Usulutan

LA Firpo won 8-2 on Aggregate

29 November 2025
19:15 (UTC-6)

Isidro Metapan	0-2	Aguila
Nil		Carlos Garay 29'; Tereso Benitez 80'

Estadio Jorge Calero Suárez, Metapan

Aguila won 4-1 on Aggregate

==== Semi-finals ====
===== First legs =====
7 December 2025
15:00 (UTC-6)

Aguila	1-3	LA Firpo
Ronald Rodríguez (pen.), 82'		Styven Vásquez 4'; Lucas Matheus Dos Santos 73'; Cristian Gil 88'

Estadio Juan Francisco Barraza, San Miguel
7 December 2025
15:00 (UTC-6)

Cacahuatique	1-2	Alianza
Alesson Ferreira 53'		Narciso Orellana 3'; Leonardo Menjivar 5'

Complejo Capeltique, Capeltique

===== Second legs =====
13 December 2025
18:00 (UTC-6)

Alianza	3-0	Cacahuatique
Carlos Salazar 18'; Oscar Rodriguez 69'; Michell Mercado 88'		Nil

Estadio Jorge Magico Gonzalez, San Salvador
Referee: TBD

Alianza won 5-1 on aggregate

13 December 2025
19:00 (UTC-6)

LA Firpo	0-1	Aguila
Nil		Julio Sibrián 49'

Estadio Sergio Torres, Usulutan
Referee: TBD

LA Firpo won 3-2 on aggregate

=== Final ===
December 20, 2025
13:15 UTC−6
Final

LA Firpo	0-0	Alianza
Nil		Nil
Penalties
Cristian Gil (penalty scored); Diego Flores (penalty scored); Wilber Arizala (penalty scored); Eduardo Vigil (penalty scored); Mauricio Cerritos (penalty scored)	5-4	(penalty missed) Mario Jacobo; (penalty scored) Michell Mercado; (penalty scored) Emerson Mauricio; (penalty scored) Andrés Hernández; (penalty scored) Juan Carlos Portillo

Estadio Jorge Magico Gonzalez, San Salvador
Attendance: TBD
Referee: Germán Martínez

LA Firpo
GK	25	(El Salvador) Felipe Amaya
DF	6	(El Salvador) Eduardo Vigil
DF	3	(Colombia) Wilber Arizala
DF	12	(El Salvador) Diego Flores
DF	14	(El Salvador) Herson Rodriguez	(substituted off) 105'
MF	10	(El Salvador) Victor Garcia	(substituted off) 62'
MF	8	(El Salvador) Bryan Landaverde	(substituted off) 76'
MF	17	(El Salvador) Mauricio Cerritos
FW	21	(El Salvador) Elias Gumero	(substituted off) 87' (yellow card) 81'
FW	7	(El Salvador) Styven Vásquez	(substituted off) 87'
FW	35	(El Salvador) Nelson Diaz
Substitutes:
MF	'28	(Brazil) Lucas Matheus		(substituted on) 62' (substituted off) 105'
MF	4	(El Salvador) Ervian Flores		(substituted on) 76' (yellow card) 85'
MF	27	(El Salvador) Diego Ortez	(substituted on) 87'
FW	19	(El Salvador) Cristian Gil	(substituted on) 87'
MF	16	(El Salvador) Brian Martinez	(substituted on) 105'
MF	44	(El Salvador) Elmer Rodriguez	(substituted on) 105'
Manager:
(Costa Rica) Marvin Solano

Alianza
GK	25	(El Salvador) Mario González	(substituted off) 37'
DF	15	(El Salvador) Jonathan Jiménez	(yellow card) 75'
DF	5	(El Salvador) Mario Jacobo
DF	27	(Colombia) Julian Grueso	(yellow card) 29'
DF	20	(El Salvador) Alejandro Henriquez
MF	6	(El Salvador) Narciso Orellana
MF	8	(El Salvador) Óscar Rodríguez	(substituted off) 49'
MF	10	(El Salvador) Leonardo Menjívar
MF	26	(El Salvador) Noel Rivera	(substituted off) 88'
MF	7	(Uruguay) Ángelo Rodríguez	(substituted off) 46'
FW	21	(El Salvador) Carlos Salazar	(yellow card) 74'
Substitutes:
GK	1	(El Salvador) Cristopher Rauda		(substituted on) 37'
MF	'23	(El Salvador) Michell Mercado		(substituted on) 46'
MF	19	(El Salvador) Andrés Hernández		(substituted on) 49'
DF	11	(El Salvador) Juan Carlos Portillo	(substituted on) 88'
FW	30	(El Salvador) Emerson Mauricio	(substituted on) 90'
Manager:
(Argentina) Ernesto Corti

Apertura 2025 champions

11th title

== Clausura ==
=== League table (Clausura) ===
Pos	Team	Pld	W	D	L	GF	GA	GD	Pts	Qualification or relegation
1	FAS	22	16	5	1	49	16	+33	53	Advance to Playoffs
2	Luis Ángel Firpo	22	13	5	4	34	20	+14	44	Advance to Playoffs
3	Alianza	22	11	4	7	36	30	+6	37	Advance to Playoffs
4	Inter	22	10	6	6	27	25	+2	36	Advance to Playoffs
5	Municipal Limeño	22	10	5	7	33	21	+12	35	Advance to Playoffs
6	Águila	22	10	5	7	27	24	+3	35	Advance to Playoffs
7	Isidro Metapán	22	6	9	7	23	30	−7	27	Advance to Playoffs
8	Cacahuatique	22	6	8	8	24	28	−4	26	Advance to Playoffs
9	Platense	22	4	8	10	24	31	−7	20	
10	Hércules	22	4	7	11	27	43	−16	19	
11	Fuerte San Francisco	22	2	8	12	18	35	−17	14	
12	Zacatecoluca	22	3	4	15	23	42	−19	13	

Updated to match(es) played on 2 May 2026. Source: Soccerway
Rules for classification: 1) points; 2) goal difference; 3) number of goals scored.

=== Clausura 2026 Records ===
==== Records (Clausura 2026) ====
- Best home records: LA Firpo (3 points out of 3 points)
- Worst home records: Zacatecoluca (0 points out of 3 points)
- Best away records: Cacahuatique (3 points out of 3 points)
- Worst away records: Municipal Limeño (0 points out of 3 points)
- Most goals scored: FAS & Isidro Metapán (2 goals)
- Fewest goals scored: Municipal Limeño (0 goals)
- Fewest goals conceded: LA Firpo (0 goals)
- Most goals conceded: FAS, Isidro Metapán, Zacatecoluca, & Municipal Limeño (2 goals)

=== Scoring ===
- First goal of the season: (Uruguay) Matías Mier for Zacatecoluca against Cacahuatique, 6th minutes (January 17, 2026)
- First goal by a foreign player: (Uruguay) Matías Mier for Zacatecoluca against Cacahuatique, 6th minutes (January 17, 2026)
- Fastest goal in a match: 5 Minutes
  - (El Salvador) Cristian Gil for LA Firpo against Municipal Limeno, 5 minutes (January 17, 2026)
- Goal scored at the latest goal in a match: 90 minutes
  - (Brazil) Lucas dos Santos goal for LA Firpo against Municipal Limeno (January 17, 2026)
- First penalty Kick of the season:
  - (Uruguay) Matías Mier for Zacatecoluca against Cacahuatique, 6th minutes (January 17, 2026)
- Widest winning margin: 5 goals
  - Municipal Limeno 5–0 Fuerte San Francisco (February 15, 2026)
    ** Municipal Limeno 5–0 Cacahuatique (March 9, 2026)
    ** Cacahuatique 5-0 Inter FA (March 22, 2026)
    ** FAS 6-1 Zacatecoluca (April 5, 2026)
- First hat-trick of the season: (El Salvador) Emerson Mauricio for Inter FA against Isidro Metapan (February 7, 2026)
- First own goal of the season: (El Salvador) Guillermo Fuentes (Cacahuatique) for Inter FA (January 25, 2026)
- Most goals in a match: 7 goals
  - Zacatecoluca 3-4 Municipal Limeno (April 16, 2026)
- Most goals by one team in a match: 6 goals
  - FAS 6-1 Zacatecoluca (April 5, 2026)
- Most goals in one half by one team: 5 goals
  - Municipal Limeno 5-0 (5-0) Fuerte San Francisco (2nd half, February 15, 2026)
- Most goals scored by losing team: 3 goals
  - Zacatecoluca 3-4 Municipal Limeno (April 16, 2026)
- Most goals by one player in a single match: 3 goals
  - (El Salvador) Emerson Mauricio for Inter FA against Isidro Metapan (February 7, 2026)
- Players that scored a hat-trick':
  - (El Salvador) Emerson Mauricio for Inter FA against Isidro Metapan (February 7, 2026)
  - (El Salvador) Javier Ferman for Municipal Limeno against Fuerte San Francisco (February 15, 2026)
  - (El Salvador) Cristian Gil for LA Firpo against Zacatecoluca (March 19, 2026)
  - (Brazil) Gustavo Moura for Alianza against Platense (March 28, 2026)

==== Top Goalscorer (Clausura 2026) ====
No.	Player	Club	Goals
1	(El Salvador) Emerson Mauricio	Inter FA	15
2	(Colombia) Carlos Bogota	Platense	13
3	(El Salvador) Cristian Gil	LA Firpo	11
4	(Colombia) Edgar Medrano	FAS	10
5	(Brazil) Gustavo Moura	Alianza	9
6	(El Salvador) Nelson Bonilla	FAS	9
7	(El Salvador) Juan Carlos Argueta	Municipal Limeno	9
8	(Uruguay) Matías Mier	Zacatecoluca	9
9	(El Salvador) Steven Guerra	Isidro Metapan	8
10	(El Salvador) Dustin Corea	FAS	8

=== Playoff ===
==== Quarterfinals ====
===== First legs =====
6 May 2026
19:30 (UTC-6)

Aguila	2-1	Alianza
Joel Turcios 1'; Mario Jacobo , 45' (o.g.)		Gustavo Souza 7'

Estadio Juan Francisco Barraza, San Miguel
Referee: TBD
6 May 2026
19:30 (UTC-6)

Cacahuatique	1-1	FAS
Reinaldo Aparicio 67'		Kevin Santamaria 92'

Estadio Cuscatlan, San Salvador
Referee: Elmer Martínez
6 May 2025
19:30 (UTC-6)

Isidro Metapan	1-2	LA Firpo
Jhonatan Urrutia 60'		Elmer Rodriguez 48'; Wilber Arizala 90'

Estadio Jorge Calero Suárez, Metapan
Referee: TBD
7 May 2026
19:30 (UTC-6)

Municipal Limeno	2-0	Inter FA
Julian Grueso , 7' (o.g.); Jefferson Martinez 30'		Nil

Estadio Jose Ramon Flores, Santa Rosa de Lima, La Union
Referee: TBD

===== Second legs =====
9 May 2026
20:00 (UTC-6)

FAS	1-1	Cacahuatique
Rafael Tejada 6'		Óscar Cerén 58'

Estadio Óscar Quiteño, Santa Ana

2-2. FAS won 5-4 on penalties

9 May 2026
15:00 (UTC-6)

LA Firpo	1-1	Isidro Metapan
Nelson Díaz 64'	[]	Steven Guerra 42'

Estadio Sergio Torres, Usulutan

LA Firpo won 3-2 on Aggregate

9 May 2026
15:00 (UTC-6)

Alianza	0-2	Aguila
Nil		Tomás Granitto 23'; Joel Turcios 42'

Estadio Jorge "El Mágico" González, San Salvador

Aguila won 4-1 on Aggregate

10 May 2026
15:00 (UTC-6)

Inter FA	2-1	Municipal Limeno
Emerson Mauricio 82'; Isaac Portillo 84'		Rudy Ramírez 72'

Estadio Las Delicias, Santa Tecla
Referee: Filiberto Martínez

Municipal Limeno won 3-2 on aggregate

==== Semi-finals ====
===== First legs =====
13 May 2026
15:30 (UTC-6)

Aguila	1-2	LA Firpo
Federico Andrada (pen.), 73'		Cristian Gil (pen.), 47'; Marcelo Ferreira 87'

Estadio Juan Francisco Barraza, San Miguel
Referee: Ivan Barton
14 May 2026
19:30 (UTC-6)

Municipal Limeno	1-0	FAS
José Correa (62' (Pen))	[]	Nil

Estadio José Ramón Flores, Santa Rosa de Lima
Referee: Jose Waldir Garcia

===== Second legs =====
16 May 2026
20:00 (UTC-6)

LA Firpo	0-1	Aguila
Nil		Federico Andrada 49'

Estadio Sergio Torres, Usulután
Referee: TBD

2-2. Aguila won 6-5 on penalties

17 May 2026
20:00 (UTC-6)

FAS	2-0	Municipal Limeno
Rafael Tejada 50'; Edgar Medrano 69'		Nil

Estadio Óscar Quiteño, Santa Ana
Referee: Filiberto Martínez

FAS won 2-1 on aggregate

=== Final ===
May 23, 2026
18:00 UTC−6
Final

FAS	3-0	Aguila
Miguel Murrillo 6'; Jorge Cruz 11'; Yan Maciel 13'		Nil

Estadio Jorge Magico Gonzalez, San Salvador
Attendance: TBD
Referee: Filiberto Martínez

FAS
GK	1	(El Salvador) Kevin Carabantes
DF	29	(El Salvador) Jorge Cruz	11'
DF	3	(Colombia) Miguel Murillo	6' (yellow card) 54' (substituted off) 73'
DF	28	(El Salvador) Rudy Clavel
DF	16	(Mexico) Juan Vega
MF	20	(Brazil) Yan Maciel	15' (substituted off) 85'
MF	5	(El Salvador) Jose Portillo captain
MF	8	(El Salvador) Jonathan Nolasco	(substituted off) 85'
FW	7	(El Salvador) Rafael Tejada	(yellow card) 59'
FW	9	(El Salvador) Nelson Bonilla	(substituted off) 85'
FW	13	(Colombia) Edgar Medrano	(substituted off) 92'
Substitutes:
DF	2	(El Salvador) Jose Guevara	(substituted on) 73'
FW	23	(El Salvador) Dustin Corea		(substituted on) 85'
MF	17	(El Salvador) Kevin Santamaria		(substituted on) 85'
MF	'6	(El Salvador) Elmer Bonilla		(substituted on) 85'
DF	19	(El Salvador) Rpoberto Melgar	(substituted on) 92' (yellow card)
Manager:
(Mexico) Adrian Sanchez

Aguila
GK	22	(El Salvador) Benji Villalobos
DF	7	(El Salvador) Tereso Benitez
DF	2	(El Salvador) Julio Sibrian
DF	28	(El Salvador) Ronald Rodríguez
DF	4	(El Salvador) Walter Pineda
MF	16	(El Salvador) Joel Turcios	(yellow card) 59' (substituted off) 87'
MF	5	(El Salvador) Tomás Granitto captain	(substituted off) 38'
MF	27	(El Salvador) Marcelo Díaz
MF	6	(El Salvador) Dixon Rivas	(substituted off) 92'
FW	11	(El Salvador) Ricardo Villatoro	(substituted off) 46'
FW	9	(Argentina) Federico Andrada
Substitutes:
MF	14	(El Salvador) Jairo Martinez		(substituted on) 38'
MF	'10	(Spain) Diego Gregori		(substituted on) 46' (yellow card) 90'
FW	30	(El Salvador) Carlos Garay		(substituted on) 87'
DF	17	(El Salvador) Eduardo Cruz	(substituted on) 92'
DF	TBD	(Jamaica) TBD	Substituted on
Manager:
(Argentina) Santiago Davio

Clausura 2026 champions

20th title

== List of foreign players in the league ==
This is a list of foreign players in the 2025–26 season. The following players:

1. Have played at least one game for the respective club.
2. Have not been capped for the El Salvador national football team on any level, independently from the birthplace

A new rule was introduced this season, that clubs can have four foreign players per club and can only add a new player if there is an injury or a player is released and it is before the close of the season transfer window.

Águila

- (Argentina) Federico Andrada
- (Argentina) Juan Franco Cacace
- (Chile) Sebastián Julio
- (Spain) Diego Gregori
- (Paraguay) Mauro Caballero
- (Colombia) Stiven Dávila

Alianza

- (Colombia) Carlos Salazar
- (Colombia) Julián Grueso
- (Mexico) Gael Sandoval
- (Uruguay) Ányelo Rodríguez
- (Colombia) Nayan Andrés Bello
- (Argentina) Matias Steib
- (Brazil) Gustavo Souza

Cachuatique

- (Argentina) Elías Umeres
- (Brazil) Alesson Ferreira
- (Colombia) Jorge Lara
- (Colombia) Diomer Hinestroza
- (Colombia) Luis Hinestroza

FAS

- (Brazil) Yan Maciel
- (Colombia) Edgar Medrano
- (Colombia) Miguel Murrillo
- (Portugal) Diogo Figueiras
- (Mexico) Juan Vega

Firpo

- (Brazil) Lucas Matheus Dos Santos
- (Colombia) Wilber Arizala
- (Colombia) André Morales
- (Paraguay) Marcelo Ferreira
- (Cuba) Aricheell Hernández
- (Panama) Joshua Gallardo

Fuerte San Francisco

- (Argentina) Germán Aguila
- (Argentina) Cristian Belucci
- (Brazil) Wilker da Silva
- (Ecuador) Javier Cetre
- (Ecuador) Yosimar Rodriguez
- (Panama) Joshua Gallardo

Hercules

- TBD

Inter FA

- (Argentina) Lautaro Toledo
- (Colombia) Guillermo Nieves
- (Japan) Kou Gotou
- (Panama) Gabriel Brown Martínez
- (Peru) Diego Espinoza
- (Colombia) Julián Grueso
- (Colombia) Jonathan Tapias

Isidro Metapán

- (Colombia) Juan Mosquera
- (Colombia) Jhonatan Urrutia
- (Colombia) Wbeimar Zuniga
- (Trinidad and Tobago) Jomal Williams
- (Uruguay) Nicolás Gómez
- (Uruguay) Emiliano Villar
- (Uruguay) Gustavo Machado

Municipal Limeno

- (Argentina) Israel Escalante
- (Colombia) Leyvin Balanta
- (Colombia) José Erick Correa
- (Honduras) Clayvin Zúñiga
- (Uruguay) Ányelo Rodríguez
- (Uruguay) Paolo Martin Dantaz
- (Uruguay) Matías Bentín

Platense

- (Colombia) Yair Arboleda
- (Colombia) Carlos Bogotá
- (Colombia) Nayan Andrés Bello
- (Colombia) Victor Landazuri
- (Colombia) Luis Arturo Peralta
- (Ecuador) Michael Robinzon

Zacatecoluca

- (Brazil) Jonathan Santana
- (Brazil) Lucas Ventura
- (Colombia) William Palacios
- (Paraguay) Luis Enrique Ibarra
- (Paraguay) José Cabañas
- (Paraguay) Sandro Melgarejo
- (Colombia) Oscar Castellanos
- (Colombia) Danny Zúñiga
- (Uruguay) Matías Mier

(player released beginning the Apertura season, Never played a game) (player released during the Apertura season) (player released between the Apertura and Clausura seasons) (player released during the Clausura season) (Injured and ruled out for the rest of the season) (player naturalized for the Clausura season) (player released beginning the Clausura season, Never played a game)
