= 2026–27 Primera División de El Salvador =

Primera División de El Salvador
- Season: 2026–27
- Dates: 24 July 2026 – 20 December 2026 (Apertura), 17 January 2027 – 23 May 2027 (Clausura)
- All statistics correct as of 2 May 2026.

The 2026–27 Primera División de El Salvador, also known as the Liga Ganaplay, will be the 28th season and 54th and 55th Primera División tournament, El Salvador's top football division, since its establishment of an Apertura and Clausura format. LA Firpo and FAS are the defending champions of the Apertura and Clausura tournament respectively. The league will consist of 12 teams. There will be two seasons conducted under identical rules, with each team playing a home and away game against the other clubs for a total of 22 games per tournament. At the end of each half-season tournament, the top six teams in that tournament's regular season standings will take part in the playoffs.

The champions of Apertura and Clausura will qualify for the CONCACAF Central American Cup, the third team to qualify is the team with better aggregate record. Should the same team win both tournaments, both runners-up will qualify for CONCACAF Central American Cup. Should the final of both tournaments features the same two teams, the semi-finalist with the better aggregate record will qualify for CONCACAF Central American Cup.

== Teams ==
=== Promotion and relegation ===
A total of 12 teams will contest the league, including 11 sides from the 2025–26 Primera División and 1 promoted from the 2025–26 Segunda División.

Zacatecoluca F.C. was relegated to the Segunda División.

On May 31, 2026 INCA-Aruba the Clausura 2026 champion defeated the Apertura 2025 Champion Atletico Balboa 4–2 on penalties after the match ended after extra time.

=== Personnel and sponsoring ===
Team	Chairman	Head Coach	Captain	Kitmaker	Shirt Sponsors
Aguila	(El Salvador) Rigoberto Ortiz Ostorga	(Argentina) Santiago Davio	(El Salvador) Darwin Cerén	Umbro	Ganaplay
Alianza	(El Salvador) Gonzalo Sibrian	(Argentina) Roberto Pompei	(El Salvador) Henry Romero	Adidas	Claro, Pepsi, Indupalma S.A de C.V, Molsa, Senator Group Casino, ALCASA S.A de C.V. , ABANK, Mister Donut, Taqueritos, Los Rinconcitos, Sistema Fedecredito, Gatorade, Canal 4
Atletico Balboa	(El Salvador) TBD	(El Salvador) Carlos Romero	(El Salvador) Nelson Moreno	Mimagen Sports	Camseb, Electrolit, Ganaplay
Cacahuatique	(El Salvador) Juan Amaya	(Argentina) Ángel “Nino” Piazzi	(El Salvador) Reinaldo Aparicio	JymBordados Sublimación	Gasolinera Jaguar Power, Alcaldía de San Miguel Norte, Electrolit, BRAS S.A. de C.V. , Nativos de Ciudad Barrios, Rico Pollo, Inverssat S.A De C.V, Canal 4, ACACCIBA de R.L. , Centro Lab Medic, CIMACOOP DE R.L. , Agua Las Perlitas, SIING Soluciones Integrales de Inceneria
Fuerte San Francisco	(El Salvador) Ismael Guzmán	(El Salvador) Omar Sevilla	(El Salvador) Wilson Rugamas	Kapitan	Padilla, Electrolit,
FAS	(El Salvador) José Sincuir	(Mexico) Adrian Sanchez	(El Salvador) Rudy Clavel	Nil	Cementos Fortaleza, Volaris, Renosa
Firpo	(El Salvador) Ronny Hernández	(Costa Rica) Marvin Solano Abarca	(El Salvador) Lizandro Claros	Salguero	Cablesat, Arte Cerveza, Gana777, Canal 4
INCA-Aruba	(El Salvador) TBD	(El Salvador) Alcides Salazar	(El Salvador) Raymundo Cortez	TF Sports	Gana 777, Therapy Gel, Cafe Altura, CODEZA de R.L.
Inter Santa Tecla	(Costa Rica) Jose Ortiz	(Costa Rica) Luis Marin	(El Salvador) Rubén Marroquín	Maca	Unique Capital, Gana 777
Isidro Metapán	(El Salvador) Alberto Rivera	(Argentina) Gabriel Alvarez	(El Salvador) Melvin Cartagena	Elite Sports	GeniusBet El Salvador, BEMISAL, Ferretería El Indio, Concentrados Agroamigo, Electorlit, Salazar Romero S.A. de C.V, Agua Las Perlitas, Analizar Laboratorio El Salvador
Limeño	(El Salvador) Eduardo Chávez	(El Salvador) Jorge Rodriguez	(El Salvador) Elvis Claros	Arijam Sports	Universidad Dr Andres Bello, Genius Bet, Electrolit, Parque Jarden Memorial MonteCalvaro, Agua El Limon, san Rafael, Sevisal, PROHVAC
Platense	(El Salvador) Carlos Burgos	(Colombia) Martin Garcia	(El Salvador) Xavier Garcia	Tony Sports	Pollo Campestre, GanaPlay, Renosa, Tecnuveg, Ticketon, Sudagrip, Electrolit, Caja Credito Zacatecoluca

== Notable events ==
=== Conclusion of Multi-Club Ownership ===
As a result of new multi-club ownership laws, on 8 May 2026 FESFUT announced they would take ownership of Hércules and Aguila from World Talent Group and take charge of finding new owners.

=== Inter FA rebranded to Internacional Santa Tecla ===
On 27 May 2026, Inter FA announced they would be rebranded as Internacional Santa Tecla, and change team colours to green and black to be more inline with the city's previous club Santa Tecla FC.

=== Atletico Balboa purchase Hercules spot ===
On 18 June 2026, Atletico Balboa announced they had made a mutual agreement to purchase Hércules' spot in the Primera Division, conditional on FESFUT's approval. On July 6, FESFUT approved the purchase of Atletico Balboa from Hércules, conditional on Balboa meeting the league pre-requisites.

=== Introduction of VAR ===
On 24 July 2026, it was announced that video assistant referee (referred to as 'Football Video Support' or 'FVS') would be implemented for the upcoming season.

=== Foreign player increase ===
On 24 July 2026, FESFUT approved teams to have 5 foreign players in their squad, limited to four on a matchday.

=== Notable death from Apertura 2026 season and 2027 Clausura season ===
The following people associated with the Primera Division have died between the middle of 2026 and middle of 2027.

- Christian Mejia (ex Santa Clara and San Luis player)
- Antonio Orellana Rico (ex Player ANTEL, Independiente, UCA and Coach San Salvador FC)
- Alejandro Larrea (ex Uruguayan Atletico Marte and Alianza player)
- William Osorio (ex FAS, Firpo Isidro Metapán and Chalatenango player)
- Gualberto Fernández (ex Alianza, Quequeisque, Atlante, UES, Juventud Olímpica player)
- TBD (ex TBD player)

== Managerial changes ==
=== Before the start of the season ===
Team	Outgoing manager	Manner of departure	Date of vacancy	Replaced by	Date of appointment	Position in table
Hércules	(Argentina) Daniel Corti	Resigned to become coach of Managua	May 2026	None, as club sold spot to Atletico Balboa	July 2026	th (2026 Clausura)
Alianza	(El Salvador) Marco Portillo	End of Interimship	May 2026	(Argentina) Roberto Pompei	May 28, 2026	3rd and Quarterfinalist (2026 Clausura)
Isidro Metapan	(El Salvador) Hector Omar Mejia	End of Interimship	May 2026	(Argentina) Gabriel Alvarez	June 2026	7th and Quarterfinalist (2026 Clausura)
Platense	(Peru) Agustin Castillo	Suspended by FESFUT	May 28, 2026	(Colombia) Martin Garcia	May 30, 2026	9th (2026 Clausura)

=== During the Apertura season ===
Team	Outgoing manager	Manner of departure	Date of vacancy	Replaced by	Date of appointment	Position in table
Fuerte San Francisco	(El Salvador) Omar Sevilla	Mutual Consent	August 31, 2026	(Uruguay) Pablo Quiñones	September 1, 2026	11th (2026 Apertura)
Atletico Balboa	(El Salvador) Carlos Romero	Mutual Consent	September 9, 2026	(Paraguay) Roberto Gamarra	September 11, 2026	8th (2026 Apertura)
Cacahuatique	(Argentina) Ángel “Nino” Piazz	Mutual Consent	September 10, 2026	(El Salvador) Cristian Portillo (Interim)	September 1, 2026	8th (2026 Apertura)
Alianza	(Argentina) Roberto Pompei	Sacked	October 9, 2026	(Argentina) Diego Vásquez	October 9, 2026	6th (2026 Apertura)
Inter Santa Tecla	(Costa Rica) Luis Marin	Sacked	October 12, 2026	(Argentina) José Giacone	October 14, 2026	5th (2026 Apertura)

== Apertura 2026 ==
=== League table ===
Pos	Team	Pld	W	D	L	GF	GA	GD	Pts	Qualification or relegation
1	Luis Ángel Firpo	21	11	7	3	36	18	+18	40	Advance to Playoffs
2	Isidro Metapán	21	11	5	5	30	22	+8	38	Advance to Playoffs
3	FAS	21	9	8	4	34	24	+10	35	Advance to Playoffs
4	Águila	21	9	7	5	38	28	+10	34	Advance to Playoffs
5	Inter Santa Tecla	21	7	10	4	29	20	+9	31	Advance to Playoffs
6	Platense	21	7	6	8	27	26	+1	27	Advance to Playoffs
7	Alianza	21	6	9	6	27	28	−1	27	
8	Atletico Balboa	21	7	5	9	27	33	−6	26	
9	Municipal Limeño	21	6	6	9	32	33	−1	24	
10	Cacahuatique	21	4	8	9	22	32	−10	20	
11	Fuerte San Francisco	21	3	8	10	21	36	−15	17	
12	Inca Aruba	21	4	5	12	15	38	−23	17	

Updated to match(es) played on 16 August 2026. Source:
Rules for classification: 1) points; 2) goal difference; 3) number of goals scored.

== Results ==
Home \ Away	AGU	ALI	BAL	CAC	FAS	FIR	FSF	INC	INT	MET	MLI	PLA
Aguila	—	2–2	2–4	4–1	3–1	1–1	4–1	3–1	2–1	3–0	1–1	-
Alianza	3–2	—	2–0	0–0	1–1	2–2	2–2	1–1	2–2	1–0	3–2	2–1
Atletico Balboa	2–2	1–0	—	0–2	0–1	-	1–0	4–1	0–0	0–0	0–2	0–3
Cacahuatique	2–2	0–0	4–2	—	0–2	1–1	0–0	1–0	0–2	2–4	1–3	1–2
FAS	1–0	2–1	1–1	-	—	3–1	2–2	1–1	2–2	0–0	3–1	2–3
Firpo	2–0	2–0	3–1	0–0	1–1	—	4–0	2–0	3–0	1–2	2–0	1–0
Fuerte San Francisco	3–4	1–0	1–2	2–1	0–1	0–3	—	-	2–2	1–0	0–2	1–1
Inca Aruba	0–1	1–3	1–0	1–1	0–4	0–0	2–1	—	0–2	1–1	2–1	1–4
Inter Santa Tecla	0–0	2–0	1–1	2–0	2–2	1–2	1–1	4–1	—	0–0	1–2	0–0
Metapan	2–1	2–0	3–2	2–0	2–0	3–1	3–2	0–1	-	—	1–1	2–1
Municipal Limeño	0–0	-	3–4	3–3	1–3	2–3	1–1	2–0	0–1	3–1	—	1–1
Platense	0–1	2–2	1–2	0–2	2–1	1–1	0–0	2–0	0–3	1–2	2–1	—

Updated to match(es) played on ongoing. Source:
Legend: Blue = home team win; Yellow = draw; Red = away team win.
For upcoming matches, an "a" indicates there is an article about the rivalry between the two participants.

=== Records ===
- Best home records: TBD ( points out of 33 points)
- Worst home records: TBD ( points out of 33 points)
- Best away records : TBD ( points out of 33 points)
- Worst away records : TBD ( points out of 33 points)
- Most goals scored: TBD ( goals)
- Fewest goals scored: TBD ( goals)
- Fewest goals conceded : TBD ( goals)
- Most goals conceded : TBD ( goals)

=== Scoring ===
- First goal of the season: (El Salvador) Marvin Ramos for Municipal Limeno against FAS, 13th minutes (July 24, 2026)
- First goal by a foreign player: (Argentina) Federico Haberkorn for Isidro Metapan against Cacahuatique, 54th minutes (July 25, 2026)
- Fastest goal in a match: 30 seconds
  - (Colombia) Carlos Bogotá for Platense against Alianza, 30 seconds (August 26, 2026)
- Goal scored at the latest goal in a match: 98 minutes
  - (Colombia) Ronaldo Royero goal for Atlético Balboa against Fuerte San Francisco, 90’+8’ (August 24, 2026)
- First penalty Kick of the season:
  - (Argentina) Federico Haberkorn for Isidro Metapan against Cacahuatique, 68th minutes (July 25, 2026)
- Widest winning margin: 4 goals
  - LA Firpo 4–0 Fuerte San Francisco (July 29, 2026)
- First hat-trick of the season: (Argentina) Federico Haberkorn for Isidro Metapan against Cacahuatique (July 25, 2026)
- First own goal of the season: (El Salvador) TBD (TBD) for TBD (Month Day, 2026)
- Most goals in a match: 6 goals
  - Cacahuatique 2-4 Isidro Metapan (July 25, 2026)
- Most goals by one team in a match: 5 goals
  - TBD 3-4 TBD (Month Day, 2026)
- Most goals in one half by one team: 5 goals
  - TBD 5-0 (5–0) TBD (2nd half, Month Day, 2026)
- Most goals scored by losing team: 3 goals
  - TBD 3-4 TBD (Month Day, 2026)
- Most goals by one player in a single match: 3 goals
  - (Argentina) Federico Haberkorn for Isidro Metapan against Cacahuatique (July 26, 2026)
  - (Argentina) Federico Andrada for Aguila against Fuerte San Francisco (August 30, 2026)
- Players that scored a hat-trick':
  - (Argentina) Federico Haberkorn for Isidro Metapan against Cacahuatique (July 26, 2026)
  - (Argentina) Federico Andrada for Aguila against Fuerte San Francisco (August 30, 2026)

==== Top Goalscorer (Apertura 2026) ====
No.	Player	Club	Goals
1	(Colombia) Edgar Medrano	FAS	13
2	(Argentina) Federico Andrada	Aguila	12
3	(El Salvador) Juan Carlos Argueta	Municipal Limeño	10
4	(Argentina) Federico Haberkorn	Metapan	7
5	(Colombia) Carlos Bogotá	Platense	7
6	(Panama) Joshua Gallardo	Fuerte San Francisco	7
7	(El Salvador) Orlando Martinez	Atlético Balboa	6
8	(El Salvador) Luis Vasquez	Inter Santa Tecla	6
9	(Colombia) Nayan Bello	Platense	5
10	(El Salvador) Jose Posada	Metapan	5

=== Playoff ===
==== Quarterfinals ====
===== First legs =====
4 November 2025
19:30 (UTC-6)

TBD	2-1	TBD
TBD (pen.), 11'; TBD 72'	[]	TBD 35'

Estadio Cuscatlan, San Salvador
Referee: TBD
4 November 2025
19:30 (UTC-6)

TBD	2-1	TBD
TBD (pen.), 11'; TBD 72'	[]	TBD 35'

Estadio Óscar Quiteño, Santa Ana
Referee: Juan Francisco Quinteros
4 November 2025
19:30 (UTC-6)

TBD	2-1	TBD
TBD (pen.), 11'; TBD 72'	[]	TBD 35'

Estadio Cuscatlan, San Salvador
Referee: TBD
4 November 2025
19:30 (UTC-6)

TBD	2-1	TBD
TBD (pen.), 11'; TBD 72'	[]	TBD 35'

Estadio Jose Ramon Flores, Santa Rosa de Lima, La Union
Referee: TBD

===== Second legs =====
7 November 2025
20:00 (UTC-6)

TBD	0-0	TBD
Nil		Nil

Estadio Jorge Calero Suárez, Metapan

1-1. TBD won 5-3 on penalties

8 November 2025
15:00 (UTC-6)

TBD	v	TBD
TBD 42'	[]	TBD 16'

Estadio Sergio Torres, Usulutan

TBD won 3-2 on Aggregate

8 November 2025
15:00 (UTC-6)

TBD	v	TBD
TBD 42'	[]	TBD 16'

Estadio Cuscatlan, San Salvador

TBD won 2-1 on Aggregate

8 November 2025
15:00 (UTC-6)

TBD	v	TBD
TBD 42'	[]	TBD 16'

Complejo Deportivo de Chapeltique, San Miguel

1-1. TBD won 3-1 on penalties

==== Semi-finals ====
===== First legs =====
11 December 2025
20:00 (UTC-6)

TBD	2-1	TBD
TBD 35'; TBD 68'	[]	TBD 45'

Estadio Óscar Quiteño, Santa Ana
11 December 2025
20:00 (UTC-6)

TBD	2-1	TBD
TBD 35'; TBD 68'	[]	TBD 45'

Estadio Simeón Magaña, Ahuachapan

===== Second legs =====
11 December 2025
20:00 (UTC-6)

TBD	2-1	TBD
TBD 35'; TBD 68'	[]	TBD 45'

Estadio Jorge Calero Suárez, Metapan
Referee: TBD

TBD won 2-1 on aggregate

11 December 2025
20:00 (UTC-6)

TBD	2-1	TBD
TBD 35'; TBD 68'	[]	TBD 45'

Complejo Deportivo de Chapeltique, San Miguel
Referee: TBD

2-2. TBD won 5-3 on penalties

=== Final ===
May 24, 2026
18:00 UTC−6
Final

TBD	v	TBD
TBD 51'		TBD 95'

Estadio Jorge Magico Gonzalez, San Salvador
Attendance: TBD

TBD
GK	TBD	(El Salvador) TBD	Substituted off
DF	TBD	(Colombia) TBD	Substituted off
DF	TBD	(El Salvador) TBD
DF	TBD	(El Salvador) TBD
DF	TBD	(El Salvador) TBD
MF	TBD	(El Salvador) TBD
MF	TBD	(El Salvador) TBD	Goal
MF	TBD	(El Salvador) TBD	Substituted off
MF	TBD	(El Salvador) TBD	Substituted off
MF	TBD	(El Salvador) TBD	Substituted off
FW	TBD	(El Salvador) TBD	Goal
Substitutes:
GK	TBD	(El Salvador) TBD		(substituted on) 44'
MF	'TBD	(El Salvador) TBD		Substituted on
MF	TBD	(El Salvador) TBD		Substituted on
DF	TBD	(El Salvador) TBD	Substituted on
DF	TBD	(Jamaica) TBD	Substituted on
Manager:
(El Salvador) TBD

TBD
GK	TBD	(El Salvador) TBD	Substituted off
DF	TBD	(Colombia) TBD	Substituted off
DF	TBD	(El Salvador) TBD
DF	TBD	(El Salvador) TBD
DF	TBD	(El Salvador) TBD
MF	TBD	(El Salvador) TBD
MF	TBD	(El Salvador) TBD	Goal
MF	TBD	(El Salvador) TBD	Substituted off
MF	TBD	(El Salvador) TBD	Substituted off
MF	TBD	(El Salvador) TBD	Substituted off
FW	TBD	(El Salvador) TBD	Goal
Substitutes:
GK	TBD	(El Salvador) TBD		(substituted on) 44'
MF	'TBD	(El Salvador) TBD		Substituted on
MF	TBD	(El Salvador) TBD		Substituted on
DF	TBD	(El Salvador) TBD	Substituted on
DF	TBD	(Jamaica) TBD	Substituted on
Manager:
(Argentina) TBD

Clausura 2026 champions

th title

== Clausura 2027 ==
=== Records ===
- Best home records: TBD ( points out of 33 points)
- Worst home records: TBD ( points out of 33 points)
- Best away records : TBD ( points out of 33 points)
- Worst away records : TBD ( points out of 33 points)
- Most goals scored: TBD ( goals)
- Fewest goals scored: TBD ( goals)
- Fewest goals conceded : TBD ( goals)
- Most goals conceded : TBD ( goals)

=== Scoring ===
- First goal of the season: (Uruguay) TBD for TBD against TBD, 6th minutes (Month Day, 2027)
- First goal by a foreign player: (Uruguay) TBD for TBD against TBD, 6th minutes (Month Day, 2027)
- Fastest goal in a match: 5 Minutes
  - (El Salvador) TBD for TBD against TBD, 5 minutes (Month Day, 2027)
- Goal scored at the latest goal in a match: 90 minutes
  - (Brazil) TBD goal for TBD against TBD (Month Day, 2027)
- First penalty Kick of the season:
  - (Uruguay) TBD for TBD against TBD, 6th minutes (Month Day, 2027)
- Widest winning margin: 5 goals
  - TBD 5–0 TBD (Month Day, 2027)
- First hat-trick of the season: (El Salvador) TBD for TBDagainst TBD (Month Day, 2027)
- First own goal of the season: (El Salvador) TBD (TBD) for TBD (Month Day, 2027)
- Most goals in a match: 7 goals
  - TBD 3-4 TBD (Month Day, 2027)
- Most goals by one team in a match: 5 goals
  - TBD 3-4 TBD (Month Day, 2027)
- Most goals in one half by one team: 5 goals
  - TBD 5-0 (5–0) TBD (2nd half, Month Day, 2027)
- Most goals scored by losing team: 3 goals
  - TBD 3-4 TBD (Month Day, 2027)
- Most goals by one player in a single match: 3 goals
  - (El Salvador) TBD for TBD against TBD (Month Day, 2027)
- Players that scored a hat-trick':
  - (El Salvador) TBD for TBD against TBD (Month Day, 2027)

==== Top Goalscorer (Clausura 2027) ====
No.	Player	Club	Goals
1	(El Salvador) TBD	TBD	00
2	(El Salvador) TBD	TBD	00
3	(El Salvador) TBD	TBD	00
4	(El Salvador) TBD	TBD	00
5	(El Salvador) TBD	TBD	00
6	(El Salvador) TBD	TBD	00
7	(El Salvador) TBD	TBD	00
8	(El Salvador) TBD	TBD	00
9	(El Salvador) TBD	TBD	00
10	(El Salvador) TBD	TBD	00

=== Playoff ===
==== Quarterfinals ====
===== First legs =====
4 November 2025
19:30 (UTC-6)

TBD	2-1	TBD
TBD (pen.), 11'; TBD 72'	[]	TBD 35'

Estadio Cuscatlan, San Salvador
Referee: TBD
4 November 2025
19:30 (UTC-6)

TBD	2-1	TBD
TBD (pen.), 11'; TBD 72'	[]	TBD 35'

Estadio Óscar Quiteño, Santa Ana
Referee: Juan Francisco Quinteros
4 November 2025
19:30 (UTC-6)

TBD	2-1	TBD
TBD (pen.), 11'; TBD 72'	[]	TBD 35'

Estadio Cuscatlan, San Salvador
Referee: TBD
4 November 2025
19:30 (UTC-6)

TBD	2-1	TBD
TBD (pen.), 11'; TBD 72'	[]	TBD 35'

Estadio Jose Ramon Flores, Santa Rosa de Lima, La Union
Referee: TBD

===== Second legs =====
7 November 2025
20:00 (UTC-6)

TBD	0-0	TBD
Nil		Nil

Estadio Jorge Calero Suárez, Metapan

1-1. TBD won 5-3 on penalties

8 November 2025
15:00 (UTC-6)

TBD	v	TBD
TBD 42'	[]	TBD 16'

Estadio Sergio Torres, Usulutan

TBD won 3-2 on Aggregate

8 November 2025
15:00 (UTC-6)

TBD	v	TBD
TBD 42'	[]	TBD 16'

Estadio Cuscatlan, San Salvador

TBD won 2-1 on Aggregate

8 November 2025
15:00 (UTC-6)

TBD	v	TBD
TBD 42'	[]	TBD 16'

Complejo Deportivo de Chapeltique, San Miguel

1-1. TBD won 3-1 on penalties

==== Semi-finals ====
===== First legs =====
11 December 2025
20:00 (UTC-6)

TBD	2-1	TBD
TBD 35'; TBD 68'	[]	TBD 45'

Estadio Óscar Quiteño, Santa Ana
11 December 2025
20:00 (UTC-6)

TBD	2-1	TBD
TBD 35'; TBD 68'	[]	TBD 45'

Estadio Simeón Magaña, Ahuachapan

===== Second legs =====
11 December 2025
20:00 (UTC-6)

TBD	2-1	TBD
TBD 35'; TBD 68'	[]	TBD 45'

Estadio Jorge Calero Suárez, Metapan
Referee: TBD

TBD won 2-1 on aggregate

11 December 2025
20:00 (UTC-6)

TBD	2-1	TBD
TBD 35'; TBD 68'	[]	TBD 45'

Complejo Deportivo de Chapeltique, San Miguel
Referee: TBD

2-2. TBD won 5-3 on penalties

=== Final ===
May 24, 2026
18:00 UTC−6
Final

TBD	v	TBD
TBD 51'		TBD 95'

Estadio Jorge Magico Gonzalez, San Salvador
Attendance: TBD

TBD
GK	TBD	(El Salvador) TBD	Substituted off
DF	TBD	(Colombia) TBD	Substituted off
DF	TBD	(El Salvador) TBD
DF	TBD	(El Salvador) TBD
DF	TBD	(El Salvador) TBD
MF	TBD	(El Salvador) TBD
MF	TBD	(El Salvador) TBD	Goal
MF	TBD	(El Salvador) TBD	Substituted off
MF	TBD	(El Salvador) TBD	Substituted off
MF	TBD	(El Salvador) TBD	Substituted off
FW	TBD	(El Salvador) TBD	Goal
Substitutes:
GK	TBD	(El Salvador) TBD		(substituted on) 44'
MF	'TBD	(El Salvador) TBD		Substituted on
MF	TBD	(El Salvador) TBD		Substituted on
DF	TBD	(El Salvador) TBD	Substituted on
DF	TBD	(Jamaica) TBD	Substituted on
Manager:
(El Salvador) TBD

TBD
GK	TBD	(El Salvador) TBD	Substituted off
DF	TBD	(Colombia) TBD	Substituted off
DF	TBD	(El Salvador) TBD
DF	TBD	(El Salvador) TBD
DF	TBD	(El Salvador) TBD
MF	TBD	(El Salvador) TBD
MF	TBD	(El Salvador) TBD	Goal
MF	TBD	(El Salvador) TBD	Substituted off
MF	TBD	(El Salvador) TBD	Substituted off
MF	TBD	(El Salvador) TBD	Substituted off
FW	TBD	(El Salvador) TBD	Goal
Substitutes:
GK	TBD	(El Salvador) TBD		(substituted on) 44'
MF	'TBD	(El Salvador) TBD		Substituted on
MF	TBD	(El Salvador) TBD		Substituted on
DF	TBD	(El Salvador) TBD	Substituted on
DF	TBD	(Jamaica) TBD	Substituted on
Manager:
(Argentina) TBD

Clausura 2026 champions

th title

== List of foreign players in the league ==
This is a list of foreign players in the 2026–27 season. The following players:

1. Have played at least one game for the respective club.
2. Have not been tapped for the El Salvador national football team on any level, regardless of their birthplace

A new rule was introduced this season, that clubs can have four foreign players per club and can only add a new player if there is an injury, or a player is released, before the close of the season transfer window.

Águila

- (Argentina) Federico Andrada
- (Argentina) Santiago Ayala
- (Spain) Diego Gregori
- (Colombia) Stiven Dávila
- (Colombia) Yehider Ibargüen

Alianza

- (Argentina) José Barreto
- (Argentina) Juan Cruz Monteagudo
- (Brazil) Gustavo Souza
- (Colombia) William Parra
- (Uruguay) Matías Mier

Atletico Balboa

- (Colombia) Victor Landazuri
- (Colombia) Gilberth Parra
- (Colombia) Jean Aldair Rentería
- (Colombia) Ronaldo Royer
- (Colombia) Yerson Tobar

Cachuatique

- (Argentina) Hernán González
- (Argentina) Elías Umeres
- (Ecuador) Javier Cetre
- (Trinidad and Tobago) Jomal Williams

FAS

- (Brazil) Yan Maciel
- (Chile) Cesar Diaz
- (Colombia) Edgar Medrano
- (Colombia) Miguel Murrillo
- (Mexico) Juan Vega

Firpo

- (Argentina) Mauro González
- (Colombia) Wilber Arizala
- (Colombia) Jose Valencia
- (Panama) Rafael Águila

Fuerte San Francisco

- (Brazil) Rafael Holstein
- (Brazil) Vinicius Santana
- (Colombia) Carlos Salazar
- (Ecuador) Yossimar Rodriguez
- (Panama) Ángel Caicedo
- (Panama) Joshua Gallardo

Inter Santa Tecla

- (Colombia) Julián Grueso
- (Costa Rica) Yoserth Hernández
- (Cuba) Marcel Hernández
- (Panama) Freddy Góndola
- (Panama) Gabriel Brown Martínez

Isidro Metapán

- (Argentina) Federico Haberkorn
- (Colombia) Wbeimar Zuniga
- (Argentina) Javier Colli
- (Uruguay) Nicolás Gómez
- (Uruguay) Gustavo Machado

Municipal Limeno

- (Argentina) Israel Escalante
- (Uruguay) Ányelo Rodríguez
- (Uruguay) Matías Bentín

Platense

- (Colombia) Carlos Bogotá
- (Colombia) Brayam Manuel Palacios
- (Colombia) Manuel Esteban González
- (Colombia) Andres Bello

INCA-Aruba

- (Colombia) Jhon Caicedo
- (Colombia) Jonatan Urrutia
- (Panama) Aldair McKenzie
- (Panama) Alberto Ramírez
- (Paraguay) Mario Narváez

(player released beginning the Apertura season, Never played a game) (player released during the Apertura season) (player released between the Apertura and Clausura seasons) (player released during the Clausura season) (Injured and ruled out for the rest of the season) (player naturalized for the Clausura season) (player released beginning the Clausura season, Never played a game)
