= C.D. FAS =

Association football club in El Salvador

FAS
- Full name: Club Deportivo Futbolistas Asociados Santanecos
- Nicknames: El Rojo (The Red); El Cuadro Asociado; Fastanecos; Rey de Copas (The King of Cups); Tigres (Tigers); Tigrillos
- Short name: FAS
- Founded: 16 February 1947; 79 years ago
- Stadium: Estadio Óscar Quiteño
- Capacity: 17,500
- Owner: (Mexico) SSPort Inc
- President: (El Salvador) Mayra Alejandrina de Esquivel
- Manager: (Mexico) Adrián Sánchez
- League: (El Salvador) Primera División
- 2026 Clausura: Overall: 1st Playoffs: Champions
- Website: cdfas.com.sv
Home colours	Away colours

Club Deportivo Futbolistas Asociados Santanecos, commonly known as FAS (pronounced "fas"), is a professional Salvadoran football club based in Santa Ana.

It competes in Primera División de Fútbol de El Salvador, the country's top professional league. The team's nickname is Los Tigres (The Tigers). FAS was founded on 16 February 1947. The team plays its home games at the Estadio Óscar Quiteño, the third largest stadium in El Salvador.

The club has a long-standing rivalry with Águila and Alianza, and are the only three clubs to never have been relegated to the Second Division. Matches between them are known as Clásicos. FAS also plays a local derby against Isidro Metapán.

FAS is the most successful club in El Salvador football with the highest fan base. Domestically, the club has won a record twenty national league titles. In international competitions, FAS have one FIFA recognized club trophies, tied with Alianza and Águila as the only club to achieve it. They have won one CONCACAF Champions' Cup/Champions League trophies, and finished runners up in the 1979 Copa Interamericana cup, and third place in the 1980 Copa Interclubes UNCAF.

== History ==
=== The Beginning ===
Clubs from San Salvador had dominated Salvadoran football for many years. The municipal mayor of the Santa Ana district, Manuel Tomás Monedero, wanted to create a team from Santa Ana to end the dominance of the San Salvador clubs. Together with the help of Santa Ana mayor Waldo Rey, Monedero organized the union of all the clubs in Santa Ana (including Unión, Colegio Salesiano San José, Cosmos, RAL, Colón, Santa Lucía and Los 44).

On 16 February 1947, these teams united to form Futbolistas Asociados Santanecos, or FAS for short. Samuel Zaldaña Galdámez was named the club first president. It was originally proposed that the club should wear yellow and black, but Monedero settled on the more traditional choice of red and blue.

=== The First Steps ===
The club played its first match on 26 March 1947 against the previous year's champion Libertad FC at the Finca Modelo (which would be their home stadium for many years). Armando Chacón was the manager and the first match ended in a 4–1 defeat.

=== Early history (1948–1959) ===
In 1948–49, FAS moved into the First Division for the first time, and have remained their ever since. Chacón was still the manager, and the team began on a winning note by defeating Juventud Olimpica 2–1. They recorded two more wins over Dragón and Santa Anita (3–0, 3–2 respectively) before losing 3–1 to Cusatleco. FAS would ultimately finish 3rd behind Libertad FC and champion Once Municipal.

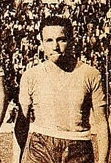
Omar Muraco

In 1951–52, FAS won their first title. The manager was Victor Manuel "Pipe" Ochoa, who proceeded to lead the club to a second title in 1953–54. During the 1956–57 season, the club came close to relegation, which caused the owners to hire Argentinian coach Alberto Cevasco and bring in the reinforcements of foreign players, including Omar Muraco, Javier Novello, Héctor Marinaro, Héctor Dadeiro and Miguelito Álvarez. This move led the club to a third title in 1958–59.

=== 1960–1992 ===
In 1961–62, César Viccinio managed the team to its fourth title, while Raul Miralles led the team to another in 1962. At the beginning of the 1963, the club moved its headquarters to the newly built Estadio Santaneco.

The early history of that stadium was marked by tragedy, as goalkeeper Oscar Quiteño collapsed during a friendly match against Orión F.C. Efforts to revive him failed, and Quiteño died on the pitch. In his honor, the club renamed the stadium to Estadio Quiteño and wore black uniforms for two years.

Fans came to believe the club was cursed, as Quiteño's death was followed by a fifteen-year title drought. Adding to that frustration was that the club reached the finals in 1965, 1968, and 1969 and meet defeat all three times. Their tormentor was Alianza, known at that time as the "Orquestra Alba" for their harmony and skill. FAS did break that curse with titles in 1977–78, 1978–79, 1981, and 1984. In addition, they won the 1979 CONCACAF Champions League by defeating Jong Colombia 8–2 on aggregate. Key to that run was forward Jorge "Mágico" González. Widely considered the greatest player in Salvadoran history, Gonzalez was at FAS from 1977 to 1982, and at that time was nicknamed Mago. After the 1982 season, he left El Salvador for Spain and La Liga, playing at Cadiz, Barcelona, and Valladolid.

However, a title drought of ten more years followed.

=== 1993–1994 ===
In 1993, that drought led to the appointment of a new board of directors. The new board's first move was to hired Uruguayan coach Saúl Rivero, as well as a host of experienced players from both Uruguay and El Salvador. The board also placed a new emphasis on youth leagues. Finally, they purchased lights for the stadium, making night games possible. FAS proceeded to win titles in 1994-95 and 1995–96, beating Luis Ángel Firpo in both seasons. Part of the key to this run was the return of Jorge "Mágico" González and the addition of Hugo Pérez.

=== 2000s ===
FAS became the most dominant team in the beginning of the century, winning six titles between 2002 and 2006, this success came under the tenureship of Peruvian Agustin Castillo

The century would start off with mild success with FAS reaching the 2000 Clausura semi final before losing to runners up ADET and this was followed by missing the finals altogether in the 2000 Apertura, marking the worst performance under the Clausura/Apertura format for FAS.

For the 2001 Clausura, FAS started a youth revolution under new coach Ruben Guevara, these players will form the backbone for the upcoming dynasty to come, these include Eliseo Quintanilla, Gilberto Murgas, Marvin Gonzalez, Gerardo Burgos, Rafael Tobar, Jaime Gómez and Juan Granados. Along with experienced players such as William Osorio, Salvador Alfaro, Ricardo Cuellar, Carlos Linares and foreigner players Uruguayans Pablo Quiñones and Alejandro Soler, Brazilian Alessandro Moresche and Argentinian Alejandro Bentos and Peruvian Antonio Serrano, they reached the final but were defeated by arch-rivals C.D. Aguila 2–1.

Towards end of the 2001 Apertura season, FAS hired Peruvian Agustin Castillo although they just missed the finals, FAS had added the final pieces and they went on to win back to back titles winning the 2002 Apertura and 2002 Clausura, defeating Alianza F.C. 4-0 and San Salvador F.C. 3-1 respectively, with the youth injected a year ago, and adding important players such as Honduran Williams Reyes, Colombian Víctor Hugo Mafla, Costa Rican Rolando Corella, William Machón, Jorge Rodríguez, Luis Contreras, Carlos Menjivar, Victor Velasquez, Daniel Sagastizado, Juan Carlos Padilla, Cristian Álvarez, Luis Castro, Ernesto Góchez, Alejandro Bentos, Juan Carlos Panameño and Alfredo Pacheco.

They failed to win three titles in a row, after losing the 2003 Clausura semi-finals match against LA Firpo in penalties. FAS would make it to the Apertura 2003 Final as they faced their arch-rivals CD Aguila. CD Aguila were within one minute of winning 2–1 on extra-time. However, Williams Reyes on a chilena would tie the game sending it to penalties. FAS would go on to win their 14th title which was their third in three years. Additionally, FAS would win the Apertura 2004, Clausura 2005, and Apertura 2009.

=== 2010s to present ===
After a small drought, On 20 December 2009 FAS won their 17th title defeating arch rival Aguila 3-2 thanks to goals for Josué Flores, Juan Carlos Moscoso and own goal by Mexican Arturo Albarrán. It's been more than a decade since FAS last won a championships, despite making five different finals including Clausura 2011 (Falling against Alianza), Clausura 2013 (Firpo), Apertura 2013 (Isidro Metapan), Apertura 2015 (Alianza) and Apertura 2019 (Alianza).

FAS progressed to the final in December 2019, where they faced the Alianza for the third time in decade; FAS was ultimately defeated in Alianza by a score of 1–0.

FAS won the Clausura 2021 Championship defeating (Alianza) on penalty shootout, after a 1-1 Draw in regular time, winning the club the 18th title.

On 15 April 2022, FAS announced that they had been acquired by American ownership group AMG Sports Following the acquisition of the club, FAS hired Ecuadorian Octavio Zambrano to manage the team. This was followed by the signings of players such as Mexican Luis Ángel Mendoza, Colombians Yílmar Filigrana and Juan Camilo Salazar, local players Rubén Marroquín, Marvin Marquez and Roberto Dominguez. This led to FAS winning the 2022 Apertura title, defeating first time finalist Jocoro 2–0, thanks to goals from Rudy Clavel and Yílmar Filigrana. On 26 December 2024, it was reported on El Grafico that CD FAS owner AMG Sports had relinquished their ownership to Ssports Inc.

== Stadium ==
Estadio Óscar Quiteño
- Cubil Felino ("Feline Den") and La Cueva del Tigre ("The Tiger Cave")
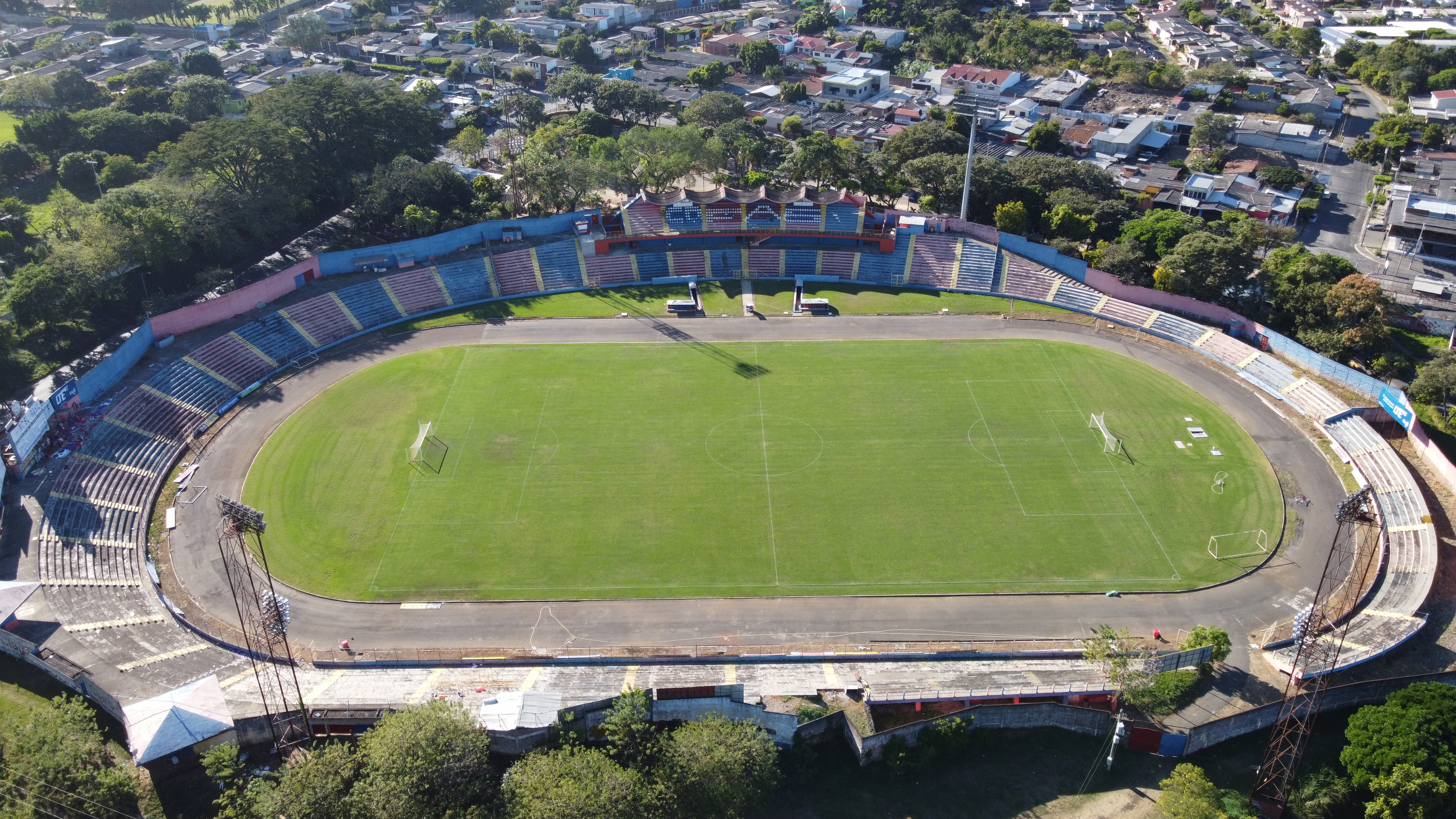
- Address: Ave Fray Felipe De Jesus Moraga Sur
- Location: Santa Ana, El Salvador
- Capacity: 17,500
- Surface: Grass

Construction
- Groundbreaking: March 1960
- Opened: January 1963
- Architect: Antonio Portillo

Club Deportivo FAS has played in the following stadium venues:

- Finca Modelo; Santa Ana (1947–62), (1989/1990)
  - Estadio Cuscatlán; San Salvador (2010, 2012, 2014) games in the CONCACAF Champions League
  - Estadio Nacional Flor Blanca; San Salvador (TBD) International games prior to the building of Estadio Cuscatlan
  - Estadio Simeón Magaña; Ahuachapán (2019) games played while renovations are being done at Estadio Oscar Quiteno
- Estadio Oscar Quiteño; Santa Ana (1963–present)

The team plays its home games in the 17,500 capacity all-seater Estadio Oscar Quiteño, in Santa Ana. The stadium is named after Oscar Quiteño, a goalkeeper of FAS who died after an accident on the soccer pitch. Previously the team played at Finca Modelo, where they had played their home matches from 1947 until the end of the 1962 season. The stadium was located in Santa Ana. The team's headquarters are located in TBD.

== Crest, Colours, Kits & Sponsorship ==
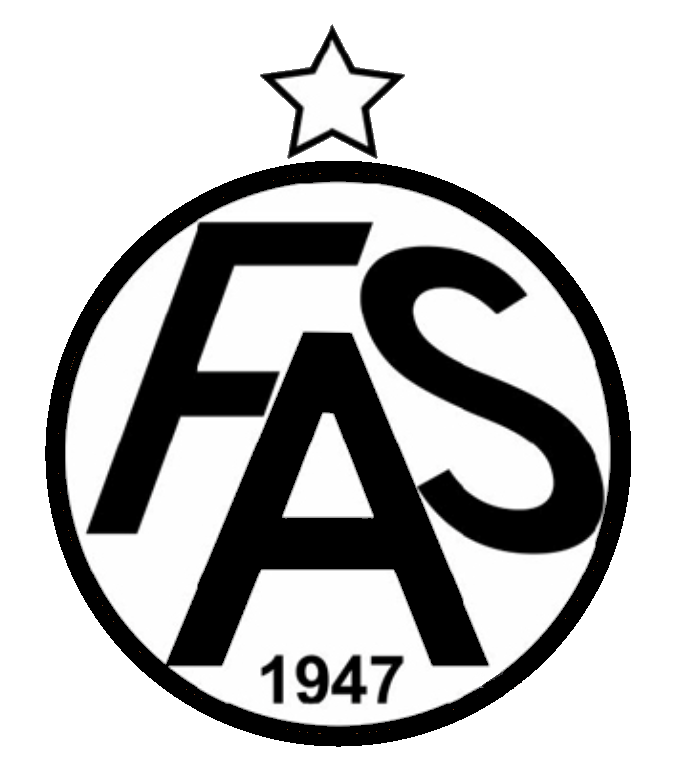
The Original Crest of FAS

FAS's crest has changed several times. Originally it consisted of the stylised letters F, A, S, which were woven into one symbol. The original crest was blue.

The FAS logo has a red, blue and white colour scheme. It has CD FAS written on the top and Santa Ana, El Salvador written on the bottom of the white ring enclosing a tiger.

=== Kit History ===
==== 1963–1981 ====
1963–65	1972–76	1980-81

==== 1992–2022 ====
1992–93	1989–91, 1994–2016	2017-18	-2022

Originally the club colours were blue and yellow, this was used until 1962 where the colours were changed to an all black outfit. However, with a new owners and stadium the colours were update to the colors used and known today to be associated with FAS blue and Red shirts, white shorts and red socks with blue stripes.

=== Sponsorship ===
Companies that FAS currently has sponsorship deals for 2026–27 season includes:

- Nil – Official kit suppliers
- (England) Shell plc – Official sponsors
- (Mexico) Cementos Fortaleza – Official sponsors
- (Mexico) Volaris – Official sponsors
- (El Salvador) Concaste – Official sponsors
- (El Salvador) Canal 4 – Official sponsors
- (El Salvador) Ganaplay.sv – Official sponsors

=== Kit makers ===
Current Kit Maker of FAS

Years	Kit manufacturers
1945–1983	Nil shirt Maker
1984	(United States) Pony
1986-1988	Nil Maker
1989-1990	(United States) Pony
1990-1992	Nil Maker
1993-1994	(England) Umbro
1995-1996	(El Salvador) Galaxia
1997-1999	(Mexico) ABA Sport
2000-2005	(El Salvador) Milan
2006-2007	(England) Umbro
2008-2012	(El Salvador) Milan
2012-2013	(England) Mitre
2014-2016	(El Salvador) Galaxia
2017-2018	(El Salvador) Milan
2019–2024	(Spain) Joma
2024–2026	(England) Umbro
2026–Present	Nil Maker

== Rivalries ==
FAS's biggest rivalries are with Alianza, Luis Ángel Firpo and Aguila. Together, these teams form the "Big Four" of Salvadoran football, and are the primary title contenders each season.

The rivalry stems not only from their competitiveness, but from the economic, political, and cultural clashes between the cities of San Miguel, Santa Ana and San Salvador, where the other three clubs are based.

== El Clásico Salvadoreño ==
Of those rivalries, FAS's rivalry with Aguila is the strongest and most passionate. That rivalry is traditionally referred to as El Clásico. The first in the series took place on 17 May 1959, and ended in a 1–1 draw. The most recent match was a 2–2 draw on 24 September 2023. The teams have played 255 matches in all competitions, FAS winning 92, Aguila 81, and the remaining 82 having been drawn.

== Honours ==
FAS is historically the most successful team in El Salvador football, as they have won the most championships with nineteen. They are also one of El Salvador's most successful team in international competitions, having won one CONCACAF Tournament. FAS is one of only three clubs to have won the CONCACAF Champions Cup.

Club Deportivo FAS Honours
National
Competitions	Titles	Seasons
Primera División de Fútbol de El Salvador	20	1951–52, 1953–54, 1957–58, 1961–62, 1962, 1977–78, 1978–79, 1981, 1984, 1994–95, 1995–96, Clausura 2002, Apertura 2002, Apertura 2003, Apertura 2004, Clausura 2005, Apertura 2009, Clausura 2021, Apertura 2022, Clausura 2026
Continental
Competitions	Titles	Seasons
CONCACAF Champions Cup	1	1979

=== Minor Cups ===
- Supacopa de Campeones
  - Winners (1): 2026
- American Airlines Cup
  - Champions (1) : 2002
- Copa Salvadorean Classic Soccer Challenge
  - Runners-up (1) : 2014
- EDESSA Independence Cup
  - Runners-up (1) : 2014
- Copa Interamericana
  - Runners-up (1) : 1979
- UNCAF Club Championship
  - Third place (1) : 1980

=== Retired numbers ===
- 10 – (El Salvador) Jorge "Mágico" González, Forward (1977–82, 1991–99)

== Players ==
=== Current squad ===
As of July 2026

Note: Flags indicate national team as defined under FIFA eligibility rules; some limited exceptions apply. Players may hold more than one non-FIFA nationality.

No.	Pos.	Nation	Player
1	GK	ESA	Kevin Carabantes
25	GK	ESA	Jonathan Valle
2	DF	ESA	Jose Guevara
31	DF	ESA	Daniel Reymundo
28	DF	ESA	Rudy Clavel (Captain)
29	DF	ESA	Jorge Cruz
3	DF	COL	Miguel Murillo
4	DF	ESA	Edson Melendez
16	DF	MEX	Juan Vega
15	DF	ESA	Kevin Ardon
5	MF	ESA	Jose Portillo
6	MF	ESA	Elmer Bonilla
8	MF	ESA	Jonathan Nolasco
20	MF	BRA	Yan Maciel
21	MF	ESA	Samuel Rosales
33	MF	ESA	Luis Moran
35	MF	ESA	Diego Rosales
26	MF	ESA	Josue Cartagena

No.	Pos.	Nation	Player
19	MF	ESA	Roberto Melgar
17	MF	ESA	Kevin Santamaria
?	FW	ESA	Bryan Rios
11	FW	CHI	Cesar Diaz
12	FW	ESA	Melvin Urbina
13	FW	COL	Edgar Medrano
7	FW	ESA	Rafael Tejada
9	FW	ESA	Nelson Bonilla
?	FW	ESA	Wilber Diaz
23	FW	ESA	Henry Sincuir

=== Out on loan ===
Note: Flags indicate national team as defined under FIFA eligibility rules; some limited exceptions apply. Players may hold more than one non-FIFA nationality.

No.	Pos.	Nation	Player
12	GK	ESA	Luis Hernandez (at Once Lobos for the 2025 Clausura)

=== In ===
Note: Flags indicate national team as defined under FIFA eligibility rules; some limited exceptions apply. Players may hold more than one non-FIFA nationality.

No.	Pos.	Nation	Player
—	DF	ESA	Kevin Ardon (From Platense)
—		ESA	Melvin Urbina (From Hercules)
—		CHI	Cesar Diaz (From TBD)
—		ESA	Wilber Diaz (From Zacatecoluca)

No.	Pos.	Nation	Player
—		ESA	Brian Ríos (From Platense)
—		ESA	Samuel Rosales (From Platense)
—		ESA	TBD (From TBD)

=== Out ===
Note: Flags indicate national team as defined under FIFA eligibility rules; some limited exceptions apply. Players may hold more than one non-FIFA nationality.

No.	Pos.	Nation	Player
—	DF	ESA	Diego Chávez (To TBD)
—	DF	ESA	David Funes (To TBD)
—	FW	USA	Diego Grande (To TBD)
—	MF	ESA	Eduardo Pinto (To TBD)

No.	Pos.	Nation	Player
—	FW	ESA	Christopher Ortiz (To TBD)
—		ESA	Dustin Corea (To TBD)
—		ESA	TBD (To TBD)

== Coaching staff ==
As for June, 2026

Position	Staff
Manager	(Mexico) Adrián Sánchez (*)
Assistant Managers	(Mexico) Javier Morán (*)
Reserve Manager	(Colombia) Miguel Ulecia (*)
Under 17 Manager	(El Salvador) Rodrigo Veliz (*)
Goalkeeper Coach	(El Salvador) Luis Contreras (*)
Sports Director	(Costa Rica) Juan Pablo Guzmán (*)
Fitness Coach	(Mexico) Isaac Gonzalez (*)
Team Doctor	(El Salvador) Dr. Andres Mckinley (*)
Kinesologisr	(El Salvador) Jorgen Castro
Physiotherapist	(El Salvador) Jorge Castro (El Salvador) Marvin Guevara
Utilities	(El Salvador) Walter Larrave (El Salvador) Mynor Flores
Game Analysts	(El Salvador) Ernesto De La O
Nutritionist	(El Salvador) Johanna Aquino
Football Scout in El Salvador	(El Salvador) Nelson Mauricio Ancheta
Football Scout in USA	(Ecuador) Miller Castillo

== Management ==
As of December 2025

Position	Staff
Owner	(Mexico) SSPort Inc
President	(El Salvador) Mayra Alejandrina de Esquivel
Vice President	(El Salvador) Emerson Avalos
Honorary President	(El Salvador) Jorge Gonzalez
Administrative Manager	(El Salvador) Rosa Miriam
Secretary	(El Salvador) Maria Torres
Club Scout	(El Salvador) Alejandro Bentos
Directing Manager	(El Salvador) Williams Reyes
General director	Vacant
Legal Representative	(El Salvador) Rosa Mélida Morán *

== Presidential history ==
Name	Years
(El Salvador) Samuel Saldaña Galdámez	1947–TBA
(El Salvador) Óscar Monedero	1950-1952
(El Salvador) Armando Tomas Monedero † (1923–1997)	1957–1980s
(El Salvador) Jaime Batlle	1960s
(El Salvador) Manuel Monedero (Jnr) †	1981–1985
(El Salvador) Roberto Matías	1994–95
(El Salvador) José Valle	1996–2009
(El Salvador) Byron Rodríguez	2009–2010
(Colombia) Margarita Jaramillo	2010–2011
(Colombia) Victor Aleman	2011
(El Salvador) David Linares	2011–2012
(El Salvador) Rafael Villanueva	2012–2014
(El Salvador) Byron Rodríguez	2014–2016
(El Salvador) Guillermo Morán	2016–2022
(El Salvador) Emerson Avalos	2023
(El Salvador) Mayra Alejandrina de Esquivel	2023–2024
(El Salvador) William Medina	2023–2024
(El Salvador) José Sincuir	2025–Present

=== Team captains ===
Name	Years
(El Salvador) Lino Alfredo Medina † (1926–2018)	1947
(El Salvador) Mario Wilfredo "Chele" Velásquez	1948-1956
(El Salvador) Max "Catán" Belloso Cubas † (1934–2020)	1961
(El Salvador) Mario Monge † (1938–2009)	1961-1968
(El Salvador) Ernesto "El Loco" Ruano	1968
(El Salvador) Eduardo Valdes	1968-1969
(El Salvador) David Arnoldo Cabrera	1971-1972
(El Salvador) Jorge Canas	1972
(El Salvador) Billy Rodriguez Bou † (1950–2002)	1975
(Argentina) Alcides Picchioni † (1945 - 2024)	1979–1984
(El Salvador) Jose Luis Rugamas	1986-1987
(Argentina) Manolo Alvarez	1987–1988
(Uruguay) Ademir Benitez	1988–1989
(El Salvador) Atilo Estrada	1989–1990
(El Salvador) Norberto Huezo/ Efrain Burgos	1991–1992
(Uruguay) Luis Enrique Guelmo	1992–1993
(El Salvador) William Osorio	1994–1995
(El Salvador) Jorge Abrego	1996
(El Salvador) Jaime Murillo	1997
(El Salvador) William Osorio	1998–2004
(El Salvador) Victor Velasquez	2004–2006
(El Salvador) Cristian Edgardo Álvarez	2006–2007
(El Salvador) Alfredo Pacheco † (1982 – 2015)	2007–2009
(El Salvador) Cristian Edgardo Álvarez	2009–2010
(El Salvador) Ramon Flores	2011–2012
(El Salvador) (Honduras) Williams Reyes	2013
(El Salvador) Alexander Méndoza	2014–2015
(El Salvador) Luis Edgardo Contreras	2015–2016
(El Salvador) Néstor Renderos	2017–2019
(El Salvador) Xavier García	2019-2021
(Mexico) Carlos Peña	2021
(El Salvador) Wilma Torres	2021-2023
(El Salvador) Rudy Clavel	2023-Present

== Club records ==
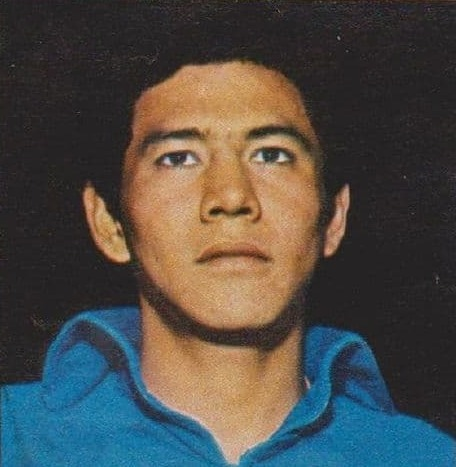
David Cabrera is FAS's record goalscorer and the first player to score six goals a in a single Primera division game.

David Cabrera is the all-time leading goalscorer for FAS, with 242—since joining the club in 1966. Williams Reyes, who is the all-time topscorer in Clausura-Apertura format for FAS comes in second in all competitions with 139. Omar Muraco is the club's highest scorer in a single season with 39 goals in 00 appearances in the 1957–58 season. The most goals scored by a player in a single match is 6, which is also a Salvadoran record. This was achieved by David Cabrera in a game against UES in the 1980 season. The biggest victory recorded by FAS was 11–0 against Independiente, Primera División, 3 May 1959. FAS' heaviest championship defeats came during the 1989 season: It was against Alianza in 1989 (1–7).

- FAS has the national record of most national titles won with 19
- First Primera division game and victory for FAS 2–1 Juventud Olimpica 19 September 1948
- Largest victory was against Independiente 11–1, 3 May 1959
- Largest defeat was 1–7 against Alianza F.C. 29 October 1989 at Estadio Cuscatlán. Raúl Toro (4), César Pineda (2) and Jaime Rodríguez scored for Alianza. Jorge Ábrego scored the only goal for FAS.
- Most goal by any national team with 3,000 goal as of 4 July 2009
- Most goals scored by a player in one season: Omar Muraco 39 goals in 1957–58

=== Historical Matches ===
23 December 1951 Friendly	C.D. FAS	0-1	Newell's Old Boys	San Salvador, El Salvador
	Nil		TBD	Stadium: TBD

16 December 1951 Friendly	C.D. FAS	0-3	Club Atlético Banfield	San Salvador, El Salvador
	Nil		TBD; TBD; TBD	Stadium: TBD

7 January 1953 Friendly	C.D. FAS	0-2	Racing Club	San Salvador, El Salvador
	Nil		M.Boyé 7'; Blanco 62'	Stadium: TBD

26 January 1958 Friendly	C.D. FAS	0-4	Botafogo	San Salvador, El Salvador
	Nil		Garrincha 15' 20' 30'; Paulo Valentim 18'	Stadium: Estadio Flor Blanco

30 November 1958 Friendly	C.D. FAS	1-2	Malmö FF	San Salvador, El Salvador
	Leonel Cubas		Svahn	Stadium: Estadio Flor Blanco

1 January 1962 Friendly	C.D. FAS	1-2	Cruzeiro	San Salvador, El Salvador
	TBD		TBD; TBD	Stadium: Estadio Flor Blanco

30 November 1962 Friendly	C.D. FAS	0-4	FC Barcelona	San Salvador, El Salvador
	Nil		Kocsis 17'; José Antonio Zaldua 57'; Pereda 71'; Camps 81'	Stadium: Estadio Flor Blanco

26 January 1964 Friendly	C.D. FAS	1-7	Palmeiras	San Salvador, El Salvador
	Flores		Vavá; Nilo; Alencar; Ademir da Guia	Stadium: Estadio Flor Blanco

6 February 1966 Friendly	C.D. FAS	1-2	Botafogo	San Salvador, El Salvador
	Goal		Goal	Stadium: Estadio Flor Blanco

26 February 1969 Friendly	C.D. FAS	0-2	Dukla Prague	San Salvador, El Salvador
	Nil		TBD; TBD	Stadium: Estadio Flor Blanco

25 June 1983 Friendly	C.D. FAS	1-4	Cruzeiro	San Salvador, El Salvador
	TBD		TBD; TBD; TBD; TBD	Stadium: Estadio Flor Blanco

26 April 1984 Friendly	C.D. FAS	0-0	Bangu	San Salvador, El Salvador
	Nil		Nil	Stadium: Estadio Cuscatlan

1985 Friendly	C.D. FAS	0-0	Celta de Vigo	San Salvador, El Salvador
	Nil		Nil	Stadium: Estadio Cuscatlan

23 April 1995 Friendly	C.D. FAS	3-1	Bolivar	Washington, D.C., United States
	Dionel Bordon; Marcelo Bauza; TBD		TBD	Stadium: Robert F. Kennedy Memorial Stadium

21 May 2006 Friendly	C.D. FAS	2-2	Boca Juniors	San Salvador, El Salvador
	Juan Carlos Moscoso; Lucas Abraham 84'		Andres Franzoia 45'; Federico Insúa 89'	Stadium: Estadio Cuscatlan

21 January 2007 Friendly	C.D. FAS	2-0	Alianza Lima	Los Angeles, United States
	Ramon Flores 3'; Paolo Suarez 79'	[]	Nil	Stadium: Titan Stadium

14 March 2015 Friendly	C.D. FAS	1-0	New York Cosmos	San Salvador, El Salvador
	Dustin Corea 84'		Nil	Stadium: Estadio Cuscatlan

== Head coaches of FAS ==
FAS has had various coaches since its formation in 1947. Agustín Castillo has served four terms as head coach. Ricardo Mena Laguán, Ruben Guevara and Victor Manuel Ochoa served two terms as head coach. Agustin Castillo was the club's most successful coach, having won five Primera División titles, following closely is Jose Eugenio Castro Chepito, who won two Primera titles, and one CONCACAF Champions' Cup 1979, and Victor Manuel Ochoa & Saul Lorenzo Rivero won two Primera titles.

Name	Nationality	From	To	Honours
Victor Manuel Ochoa	El Salvador	1 July 1951; 1 July 1969	12 June 1954; 1 July 1969	2 Salvadoran championships (1951–1952, 1953–1954)
Alberto Cevasco	Argentina	1 January 1958	12 June 1959	1 Salvadoran championships (1957–1958)
César Viccinio	Argentina Italy	1 January 1961	12 June 1962	1 Salvadoran championships (1961–1962)
Raúl Miralles	Argentina	1 January 1962; 1 May 1975	12 June 1963; 1 July 1975	1 Salvadoran championships (1962)
José Eugenio "Chepito" Castro	El Salvador	1 January 1976	12 December 1979	2 Salvadoran championships (1977–1978, 1978–1979), 1 CONCACAF Champions' Cup 1979, 1 Runners up Copa Interamericana
Juan Francisco Barraza † (1935–1997)	El Salvador	1 January 1980	12 June 1982	1 Salvadoran championships (1981)
Juan Quarterone † (1935–2015)	Argentina	1 January 1983	12 June 1984	1 Salvadoran championships (1984)
Saul Lorenzo Rivero † (1954–2022)	Uruguay	1 January 1995	12 January 1997	2 Salvadoran championships (1994–1995, 1995–1996)
Agustin Castillo	Peru	1 July 2001; 1 February 2012; 1 September 2014 20 August 2024	12 September 2005; 1 December 2012; 1 December 2015; 24 February 2025	5 Salvadoran championships (Clausura 2002, Apertura 2002, Apertura 2003, Apertura 2004, Clausura 2005)
Roberto Gamarra	Argentina Paraguay	1 January 2009	12 June 2010	1 Salvadoran championships (Apertura 2009)
Jorge Rodriguez	El Salvador	1 March 2020	12 June 2022	1 Salvadoran championships (Clausura 2021)
Octavio Zambrano	Ecuador	1 June 2022	12 April 2023	1 Salvadoran championships (Apertura 2022)
Adrian Sanchez	Mexico	12 December 2025	Present	1 Salvadoran championships (Clausura 2026)

== Development system ==
=== Reserve team ===
The reserve team serves mainly as the final stepping stone for promising young players under the age of 21 before being promoted to the main team. The second team is coached by Nelson Ancheta. The team played in the Primera División Reserves, Their greatest successes were winning the Reserve championships in Clausura 2017, Apertura 2017, Clausura 2019.

=== Reserve Current Squad ===
As for July 2025 Note: Flags indicate national team as defined under FIFA eligibility rules; some limited exceptions apply. Players may hold more than one non-FIFA nationality.

No.	Pos.	Nation	Player
31		ESA	Ramiro Guillen
32		ESA	Noah Gutierrez
33		ESA	David Funez
34		ESA	Brandon Retana
35		ESA	Eduardo Pinto
38		ESA	Luis Moran
41		ESA	Hector Vasquez
46		ESA	David Bonilla
48		ESA	Anderson Rivera
54		ESA	Oscar Delgado

No.	Pos.	Nation	Player
59		ESA	Henry Escobar
—		ESA	A Rosales
—		ESA	A Leiva
—		ESA	A Martinez
—		ESA	S Martinez
—		ESA	J Cruz
—		ESA	C Lainez
—		ESA	E Chicas
58		ESA	Ovidio Guzman

=== Players with dual citizenship ===
- (El Salvador) (United States) TBD

==== Head coaches history ====
Name	Years	Honours
(El Salvador) Óscar Interiano	2009	
(El Salvador) Edgar Batres	2010-2011	
(Uruguay) Pablo Quiñónez	2012	
(El Salvador) Erick Dowson Prado	2015	Apertura 2015
(El Salvador) Edgar Batres	2018	
(El Salvador) Enzo Enríquez	2019-2020	
(El Salvador) Efren Marenco	May 2022-June 2024	
(El Salvador) Juan Carlos Moscoso	July 2024-July 2024	
(El Salvador) Nelson Ancheta	July 2024- May 2025	
(El Salvador) Douglas Vidal Jiménez	June 2025-December 2025	
(Uruguay) Pablo Quiñones	January 2026 - June 2026	
(Colombia) Miguel Ulecia	June 2026 - Present	

==== Junior teams ====
The youth team (under 17 and under 15) has produced some of El Salvador's top football players, including TBD and TBD. They are currently coached by Rodrigo Vega.

==== Head coaches history ====
Name	Years	Honours
(El Salvador) TBD	July 2024- May 2025	
(El Salvador) TBD	June 2025-December 2025	
(Uruguay) Pablo Quiñones	January 2026- May 2026	
(El Salvador) Rodrigo Vega	June 2026-Present	

== Women's team ==
The women's first team, known as FAS Femenino which is led by head coach Edwin Deras, features several members of the El Salvador national ladies team. Their greatest successes was winning the 2021 Clausura 3-2 penalties.

=== Current squad ===
As of: June, 2025 Note: Flags indicate national team as defined under FIFA eligibility rules; some limited exceptions apply. Players may hold more than one non-FIFA nationality.

No.	Pos.	Nation	Player
—		USA	Brianna Cortez
—		USA	Lucia Yañez
—		USA	Zariah Nogales
—		ESA	Diana Pérez
—		ESA	Claudia Barahona

No.	Pos.	Nation	Player
—		ESA	Michelle Cerna
—		ESA	Jesslyn Torres
—		ESA	Ana Nicole Valenzuela
—		ESA	TBD
—		ESA	TBD

=== In ===
Note: Flags indicate national team as defined under FIFA eligibility rules; some limited exceptions apply. Players may hold more than one non-FIFA nationality.

No.	Pos.	Nation	Player
—		USA	Brianna Cortez (From TBD)
—		USA	Lucia Yañez (From TBD)
—		USA	Zariah Nogales (From TBD)
—		MEX	Maria Acosta (From Club Necaxa)
—		COL	Camila Valencia (From Nejmeh SC)

No.	Pos.	Nation	Player
—		COL	Kendy Morales (From Club Social y Deportivo El Frontón)
—		ESA	Gabriela Menjivar (From Isidro Metapan)
—		ESA	Keily Menjivar (From Free Agent)
—		USA	Destiny Davis (From Lady Arsenal FC)
—		ESA	TBD (From TBD)

=== Out ===
Note: Flags indicate national team as defined under FIFA eligibility rules; some limited exceptions apply. Players may hold more than one non-FIFA nationality.

No.	Pos.	Nation	Player
—		ESA	TBD (To TBD)
—		ESA	TBD (To TBD)
—		ESA	TBD (To TBD)

No.	Pos.	Nation	Player
—		ESA	TBD (To TBD)
—		ESA	TBD (To TBD)
—		ESA	TBD (To TBD)

=== Head coaches history ===
Name	Years	Honours
(El Salvador) Ofni Bolaños	2019 - 2022	2 Liga Femenina (2019 Clausura, 2021 Clausura)
(El Salvador) Cristian Zañas	2022 - 2023	1 Liga Femenina (2022 Clausura)
(El Salvador) Juan Carlos Moscoso	2023 - 2024	
(El Salvador) Sergio Criollo	2024 - August 2024	
(Colombia) Nito Gonzalez	September 2024 - October 2024	
(El Salvador) Alvaro Canizales	October 2024 - December 2024	
(El Salvador) Edwin Deras	January 2025 - May 2026	
(El Salvador) Dalila Cazún	June 2026 - Present	

== Other sporting departments ==
FAS has other departments for a variety of sports.

=== Basketball ===
FAS Denver Básquetbol Club was founded in 2015 and play Liga Mayor de Baloncesto (LMB) which is the highest level in El Salvador league tier. the club is led by head coach TBD, the club features several key members including Puerto Rican Bryan Vásquez and TBD. Their greatest successes were winning the 2015 Clausura. However, after two years, the other sports section of FAS including Baskbetball and baseball was dissolved in 2017 due to financial reasons.

Famous players such as venzeualn Jonathan José Figuera

=== Baseball ===
FAS Béisbol Club was founded in 2016 and play Liga Nacional de Béisbol (LNB) which is the highest level in El Salvador league tier. the club is led by head coach Venezuelan Jesús Cartagena, the club features several key members including Puerto Rican Bryan Vásquez and TBD. Their greatest successes were reaching the TBD

=== Volleyball ===
FAS Voleibol Club was founded in 2016 and play Campeonaro Nacional which is the highest level in El Salvador league tier. the club is led by head coach TBD, the club features several key members including TBD and TBD. Their greatest successes were reaching the TBD

== Sources ==
- "Jugadores del FAS esperan el pago de sus últimos dos meses de salario". El Gráfico.
- "FAS alternará estadios durante el Apertura 2017". La Prensa Gráfica.
- "El FAS participará en las Fiestas Julias". La Prensa Gráfica.
- "Juan Aimar y Dustin Corea están en la órbita del FAS". El Gráfico.
- "Al FAS solo le falta definir un foráneo". La Prensa Gráfica.
- "FAS quiere fichar a un extranjero de renombre". El Gráfico.
- "Realizarán homenaje al FAS pentacampeón". El Mundo. 7 July 2017.
- "El campeón de la LMF abrirá contra FAS en Torneo Apertura". El Mundo. 28 June 2017.
- Díaz, Edgardo (26 June 2017). "Sale a la luz supuesto arreglo de partido entre FAS y Olimpia de Honduras". Solo Noticias.
- "Irvin Herrera, presente en el clásico entre FAS y Águila". El Gráfico.
- "¿Paternidad del FAS o favoritismo del Alianza? Hoy se decide". El Gráfico.
- "Comisión disciplinaria sancionó a FAS por uso de pólvora". El Gráfico.
- "Larga caravana de aficionados de FAS para llegar al Cuscatlán". El Gráfico.
- "La indirecta del FAS: "Nosotros no tenemos estrellas"". El Gráfico.
- "El FAS inconforme por designación arbitral para juego ante Alianza". El Gráfico.
- "FAS anunció sus bajas para el Clausura 2018". El Gráfico.
- "Regresa al FAS un viejo conocido". El Gráfico.
- "Así se despiden Alianza y FAS del 2017". El Gráfico.
- "Irvin Herrera: "Quiero buscar el título y ser campeón goleador con FAS"". El Gráfico.
- "New York Cosmos le desea suerte a Irvin Herrera". El Gráfico.
- "El FAS confirma la salida del colombiano Teobaldo Torres". El Gráfico.
- "Coloca aún no renueva con el FAS". El Gráfico.
- "Williams Reyes fue la novedad en el entreno de FAS y busca un cupo". El Gráfico.
- "Cristiam Álvarez: "Nosotros mismos nos complicamos"". elsalvador.com. 8 March 2018.
- "FAS dará continuidad a sus cuerpo técnico para el Clausura 2018". El Gráfico.
- "Cristiam Álvarez: "No enfrentamos a un equipo sencillo"". elsalvador.com. 28 January 2018.
- "Cristiam Álvarez: "Pudimos ganar por más margen"". Culebrita Macheteada.
