= Cristian Flores =

Mexican footballer and manager (born 1988)

Personal information
- Full name: Cristian Flores Íñiguez
- Date of birth: 30 April 1988 (age 38)
- Place of birth: Guadalajara, Jalisco, Mexico
- Height: 1.78 m (5 ft 10 in)
- Position: Goalkeeper

Senior career*
Years	Team	Apps	(Gls)
2010	Jaguares		(0)
2011	La Piedad	9	(0)

Managerial career
- 2014–2015: Zacatecas (Assistant)
- 2015–2016: Zacatecas (Liga TDP)
- 2016–2017: Zacatecas Premier
- 2017: Zacatecas (Assistant)
- 2018: Pachuca Reserves and Academy
- 2019–2023: Mexico U15
- 2021–2022: Mexico (women) (Assistant)
- 2025: FAS
Medal record
Representing Mexico
Men's football
FIFA U-17 World Cup
Winner	2005 Peru
- * Club domestic league appearances and goals as of 8 February 2010

Cristian Flores Íñiguez (born 30 June 1988) is a Mexican former professional footballer and current manager of the Mexico national under-15 team.

== Honours ==
=== Player ===
Mexico U17

- FIFA U-17 World Championship: 2005
