= Emerson Mauricio =

Salvadoran footballer

Personal information
- Full name: Emerson Saúl Mauricio Aquino
- Date of birth: 27 August 2002 (age 24)
- Place of birth: San Marcos, El Salvador
- Height: 1.83 m (6 ft 0 in)
- Position: Forward

Team information
- Current team: Alianza
- Number: 30

Youth career
- 2016–2021: Alianza

Senior career*
Years	Team	Apps	(Gls)
2021–2026	Alianza	142	(49)
2026-	Inter FA		(15)

International career^{‡}
2019	El Salvador U17	5	(5)
2023–	El Salvador U23	4	(0)
2023–	El Salvador	11	(3)
- * Club domestic league appearances and goals as of 15:53, 9 September 2024 (UTC) ‡ National team caps and goals as of 15:53, 9 September 2024 (UTC)

Emerson Saúl Mauricio Aquino (born 27 August 2002) is a Salvadoran professional footballer who plays as a forward for Primera División club Alianza and the El Salvador national team.

== Club career ==
=== Alianza ===
==== 2023–24: La 18 ====
Mauricio started for Alianza in the final match of the Clausura 2024. He scored four goals in the match against Municipal Limeño to secure the club's eighteenth title. His first goal came just ten minutes into the eventual 5–0 victory. Mauricio was named the MVP of the match and became the first-ever player to score four goals in the competition's final.

==== 2024–25: La 19 ====
He was then part of the Alianza squad that competed in the 2024 CONCACAF Central American Cup. The club was eliminated in the Group Stage, despite goals from Mauricio against LA Firpo and Alajuelense.

== International career ==
=== Youth ===
Mauricio represented El Salvador at the youth level at the 2019 CONCACAF U-17 Championship and scored five goals in five matches. He later represented the country at the 2023 Central American and Caribbean Games in which he captained the national under-23 team. He provided the assist on Luis Vásquez's goal to secure a 1–1 draw with Mexico.

=== Senior ===
Mauricio made his senior international debut on 7 September 2023 in a 2023–24 CONCACAF Nations League A match against Guatemala. As the league's top scorer for Allianza, he was recalled to the squad the following year for 2024–25 CONCACAF Nations League B matches against Montserrat and Bonaire. He went on to score in both matches, including the game-winner against Bonaire.

== Career statistics ==
=== International goals ===
Scores and results list El Salvador's goal tally first.

No.	Date	Venue	Opponent	Score	Result	Competition
1.	5 September 2024	Stadion Antonio Trenidat, Rincon, Bonaire	Montserrat	2–1	4–1	2024–25 CONCACAF Nations League B
2.	8 September 2024	Stadion Antonio Trenidat, Rincon, Bonaire	Bonaire	2–0	2–1	2024–25 CONCACAF Nations League B
Last updated 9 September 2024

=== International career statistics ===
As of match played 8 September 2024.

El Salvador national team
Year	Apps	Goals
2023	3	0
2024	3	2
2025	4	0
2026	2	0
Total	13	2

== Honours ==
Alianza

- Primera División: 2022 Clausura, 2024 Clausura, 2025 Clausura

Individual

- Salvadoran Primera División top scorer (1): Clausura 2006
