= Mario Jacobo =

Salvadoran footballer (born 1996)

Personal information
- Full name: Mario Alberto Jacobo Segovia
- Date of birth: 2 August 1996 (age 30)
- Place of birth: San Salvador, El Salvador
- Height: 1.83 m (6 ft 0 in)
- Position: Defender

Team information
- Current team: Alianza
- Number: 5

Youth career
- Alianza

Senior career*
Years	Team	Apps	(Gls)
2015–	Alianza	166	(2)

International career^{‡}
2012	El Salvador U17	4	(1)
2021	El Salvador	1	(0)
- * Club domestic league appearances and goals as of 26 May 2024 ‡ National team caps and goals as of 13 October 2021

Mario Alberto Jacobo Segovia, known as Mario Jacobo (born 2 August 1996) is a Salvadoran professional footballer who plays as a defender for Primera División club Alianza.

== International career ==
He made his debut for the El Salvador national football team on 13 October 2021 in a World Cup qualifier against Mexico. He started the game and was sent off in the 49th minute.
