= Santiago Davio =

Argentine footballer

Personal information
- Full name: Carlos Santiago Davio
- Date of birth: 3 February 1985 (age 41)
- Place of birth: Capilla del Señor, Argentina
- Height: 1.83 m (6 ft 0 in)
- Position: Forward

Senior career*
| Years | Team | Apps | (Gls) |
| 2004 | Villa Dálmine | | |
| 2005–2006 | Defensores Unidos | | |
| 2007 | Atlas | | |
| 2007 | → Sora (loan) | | |
| 2008–2009 | Defensores Unidos | | |
| 2010 | Caroní F.C. | | |
| 2011 | Zulia | | |
| 2011 | Defensores Unidos | | |
| 2012 | Atlas | | |
| 2012–2013 | Club Leandro N. Alem | | |
| 2013 | Suchitepéquez | | |
| 2014 | Defensores Unidos | 7 | (3) |
| 2015 | UES | | |
| 2015 | Sportivo Desamparados | | |
- * Club domestic league appearances and goals

Carlos Santiago Davio (born 3 February 1985) is an Argentine professional footballer who plays as a forward.
