= Horacio Díaz Luco =

Chilean footballer (1943–2025)

Personal information
- Full name: Manuel Horacio Díaz Luco
- Date of birth: 13 July 1950
- Place of birth: Santiago, Chile
- Date of death: 26 May 2025 (aged 74)
- Place of death: Curacaví, Chile
- Height: 1.74 m (5 ft 9 in)
- Position: Centre-back

Senior career*
Years	Team	Apps	(Gls)
1970	Santiago Wanderers	2	(0)
1971–1973	Herediano		
1974	Cartaginés		
1975–1977	Águila		
1977–1978	Limón Sprite		
1979–1980	Municipal Turrialba		
1981	Limonense		

Managerial career
- 1977: Limón Sprite
- * Club domestic league appearances and goals

Manuel Horacio Díaz Luco (13 July 1950 – 26 May 2025), known as Horacio Díaz Luco, was a Chilean professional footballer who played as a centre-back for clubs in Chile, Costa Rica and El Salvador.

== Career ==
Born in Santiago, Chile, Díaz played for Santiago Wanderers in 1970.

Then he moved to Costa Rica, where he played for Herediano, Limón Sprite, Cartaginés, Municipal Turrialba and Limonense, with whom he was the runner-up in the 1981 season. At the same time he was player of Limón Sprite, he performed as coach.

He also had a stint in El Salvador with Águila from 1975 to 1977, with whom he won the league title in 1975–76.

== Death ==
Díaz Luco died in Curacaví, Chile on 26 May 2025, at the age of 74.

== Honours ==
Águila

- Salvadoran Primera División: 1975–76, 1976–77
