= Kevin Carabantes =

Salvadoran footballer (born 1995)

Kévin Carabantes
Personal information
- Full name: Kévin Edenilson Carabantes Rivera
- Date of birth: 20 March 1995 (age 31)
- Position: Goalkeeper

Senior career*
Years	Team	Apps	(Gls)
- A.D. Chalatenango
- C.D. Municipal Limeño
- C.D. FAS
- * Club domestic league appearances and goals

Kévin Edenilson Carabantes Rivera (born 20 March 1995) is a Salvadoran professional footballer who plays as a goalkeeper for Primera División club FAS and El Salvador national team.

He made his debut for the full El Salvador team against Iceland on 20 January 2020.
