= Kou Gotou =

Japanese association football player

Ko Goto
Personal information
- Date of birth: 12 April 1996 (age 30)
- Place of birth: Kamakura, Kanagawa, Japan
- Height: 1.69 m (5 ft 7 in)
- Position: Winger

Team information
- Current team: Inter FA
- Number: 22

Youth career
- –2011: Yokohama F. Marinos
- 2012–2014: Teikyo Daisan High School
- 2015–2016: Argentinos Juniors
- 2016–2017: Deportivo Riestra

Senior career*
Years	Team	Apps	(Gls)
2017	Defensores San Antonio de Litín		
2017–2018	Racing General Madariaga		
2018–2019	Almirante Brown	6	(1)
2019	Deportivo Merlo	0	(0)
2022	Liniers	10	(0)
2024–2025	Khaan Khuns-Erchim	8	(16)
2025–	Inter FA	11	(1)
- * Club domestic league appearances and goals as of 15:04, 24 September 2024 (UTC)

Ko Goto (後藤 航, Gotō Kō; born 12 April 1996) is a Japanese professional footballer who plays as a winger for Primera División club Inter FA.

== Early life ==
Born in Kamakura in the Kanagawa Prefecture of Japan, Gotou first got into football through his father, Yasuyuki, a fan of Argentinian side Boca Juniors who would show Gotou videos of the club, as well as playing with his elder brother. He was in the academy of Yokohama F. Marinos before enrolling at the Teikyo Daisan High School. Upon his graduation he moved to Argentina, later stating that it had been his dream since he was a child to play football in Argentina, and citing Diego Maradona as his footballing idol.

Initially training with professional side Argentinos Juniors for ten months, he was unable to play for the club due to issues with his documentation. During his time in Argentina, he was asked to pay to play for Estudiantes, which he declined, and slept on a park bench in Plaza Irlanda, where his bag was stolen.

He dropped down to Deportivo Riestra in the Argentine fourth division, but after suffering an injury he returned to Japan for six months, working as a postman in order to raise money to return to Argentina. On his return to Argentina he played briefly for Liga Bellvillense side Defensores San Antonio de Litín.

== Club career ==
=== Racing General Madariaga ===
He first played semi-professional football with Racing General Madariaga of the Torneo Federal C, where he played alongside compatriot Hiroyuki Koyama. On his debut for the club, he scored a goal and notched two assists in a 4–1 win against San Lorenzo de Villa Gesell, and in celebrating he referenced Japanese anime Dragon Ball Z. During his time with Racing he was spotted by Alberto Papaianni, the director of professional club Almirante Brown, who invited him to trial with the club.

=== Almirante Brown ===
After two weeks of trials Gotou signed a one-year deal with Almirante Brown, becoming the first Japanese player to join the club. He marked his debut with Almirante Brown with a goal in a 2–2 draw with Tristán Suárez, having previously scored in the reserve league.

=== Merlo ===
After a further five appearances, he dropped down to Deportivo Merlo in the Primera C Metropolitana in 2019 - though he did not make any appearances for the club before leaving at the end of the year.

Following the outbreak of the COVID-19 pandemic in Argentina, Gotou returned to Japan, where he again began to save money to return to South America. In January 2020 he trialled with Colombian side Boyacá Chicó, but after failing to join the club he returned to his hometown of Kamakura, where the COVID-19 pandemic had not yet taken hold. He was linked with a move to Club Nuevo Amanecer in Ostende, Buenos Aires, but this failed to materialise.

=== Liniers ===
In February 2022, two years after leaving Argentina, Gotou returned to the country to join Primera C Metropolitana side Liniers. However, by the end of the year and after ten appearances with no goals, Liniers announced that Gotou would not continue with the team in 2023.

=== Khaan Khuns-Erchim ===
Gotou signed for Khaan Khuns-Erchim of the Mongolian Premier League during the summer 2024 transfer window, marking the first time he would play for a club in Asia outside of Japan.

=== Inter FA ===
On 19 July 2025, Gotou made a shocking move to newly founded Inter FA, becoming the third Japanese player to be in the Primera División.

== Career statistics ==
=== Club ===
As of 24 September 2024.

Appearances and goals by club, season and competition
Club	Season	League			Cup		Other		Total	
Club	Season	Division	Apps	Goals	Apps	Goals	Apps	Goals	Apps	Goals
Almirante Brown	2018–19	Primera B Metropolitana	6	1	0	0	0	0	6	1
Deportivo Merlo	2019–20	Primera C Metropolitana	0	0	0	0	0	0	0	0
Liniers	2022	Primera C Metropolitana	10	0	0	0	0	0	10	0
Career total			16	1	0	0	0	0	16	1
