= César Díaz =

César Díaz may refer to:

- César Díaz (guitarist) (1951–2002), Puerto Rican guitarist
- César Díaz (footballer, born 1975), Chilean football striker
- César Díaz (footballer, born 2002), Chilean football winger
- César Díaz (film director) (born 1978), Guatemalan director
- César Díaz (Spanish footballer) (born 1987), Spanish footballer
