= Rafael Tejada =

Salvadoran footballer (born 2003)

Personal information
- Full name: Rafael Antonio Tejada Linares
- Date of birth: 12 March 2003 (age 23)
- Place of birth: El Salvador
- Height: 1.73 m (5 ft 8 in)
- Position: Forward

Team information
- Current team: FAS
- Number: 11

Youth career
- 2022: LA FC Academy
- 2022: Las Vegas Lights FC
- 2023: FAS Reserves

Senior career*
Years	Team	Apps	(Gls)
2023–Present	FAS	101	(30)

International career
2021–	El Salvador	14	(2)
- * Club domestic league appearances and goals as of 8 January 2026

Rafael Antonio Tejada Linares (born 12 March 2003) is a Salvadoran professional footballer who plays as a forward for Primera División club FAS and the El Salvador national team.

== Career ==
Tejeda started his career LA FC Academy and Las Vegas Lights FC

== International goals ==
Scores and results list El Salvador's goal tally first.

No.	Date	Venue	Opponent	Score	Result	Competition
1.	9 June 2024	Dr. Ir. Franklin Essed Stadion, Saint Vincent and the Grenadines	Saint Vincent and the Grenadines	2–0	3-1	2026 World Cup qualification
2.	17 November 2024	Estadio Cuscatlán, San Salvador, El Salvador	Montserrat	1–0	1–0	2024-25 CONCACAF Nations League
