= Juan Carlos Argueta =

Salvadoran footballer (born 2000)

Personal information
- Full name: Juan Carlos Argueta
- Date of birth: 18 May 2000 (age 26)
- Place of birth: TBD, El Salvador
- Height: 1.75 m (5 ft 9 in)
- Position: Forward

Team information
- Current team: Municipal Limeno

Youth career
- Chagüite
- Dragon
- Fuerte San Francisco

Senior career*
Years	Team	Apps	(Gls)
2019	Fuerte San Francisco		
2020–2022	Cacahuatique		
2022–2023	Jocoro	77	(24)
2024	Isidro Metapán	42	(7)
2025	Cacahuatique	26	(12)
2026-Present	Municipal Limeno		

International career^{‡}
2022-	El Salvador	12	(0)
- * Club domestic league appearances and goals as of 8 January 2026 ‡ National team caps and goals as of 8 January 2026

Juan Carlos Argueta (born 18 May 2000) is a Salvadoran professional footballer who plays as a Forward for Primera División club Municipal Limeno and the El Salvador national team.

== Honours ==
Individual

- Salvadoran Primera División top scorer (2): Apertura 2022, Apertura 2025
