= Nicolás Gómez (footballer, born December 1992) =

Argentine footballer

Personal information
- Full name: Nicolás Agustín Gómez
- Date of birth: 3 December 1992 (age 33)
- Place of birth: Santiago del Estero, Argentina
- Height: 1.70 m (5 ft 7 in)
- Position: Midfielder

Team information
- Current team: Comunicaciones

Youth career
- River Plate

Senior career*
Years	Team	Apps	(Gls)
2013–2015	River Plate	0	(0)
2015	→ Barracas Central (loan)	3	(0)
2016	Güemes	27	(3)
2016–2017	Deportivo Paraguayo	15	(2)
2017–2018	San Jorge	9	(0)
2018	Cipolletti	0	(0)
2018–2019	Estudiantes Río Cuarto	8	(0)
2019–	Comunicaciones	7	(0)
- * Club domestic league appearances and goals as of 22:34, 21 December 2019 (UTC)

Nicolás Agustín Gómez (born 3 December 1992) is an Argentine footballer who plays as a midfielder for Club Comunicaciones.

== Career ==
Gómez's career started with River Plate. He represented them at the 2012 U-20 Copa Libertadores in Peru, which they won with Gómez appearing five times and scoring once; versus Corinthians. Gómez made his senior debut in April 2013, featuring for thirty-seven minutes of a Copa Argentina defeat to Primera B Metropolitana's Estudiantes (BA). He subsequently appeared on their substitutes bench for four fixtures in the 2012–13 Argentine Primera División season. In January 2015, Gómez completed a loan move to Barracas Central. His bow came on 11 April versus Almagro, which one of three games for the club.

In 2016, Gómez joined Güemes of Torneo Federal A. Ten appearances followed, along with relegation to Torneo Federal B; where he played sixteen times and netted three goals. A stint with Deportivo Paraguayo then occurred, prior to the midfielder signing with San Jorge. He was sent off during his debut, receiving a straight red card after sixty-three minutes of a win away to Concepción. Having participated in nine matches across two campaigns with San Jorge, Gómez departed to fellow Torneo Federal A outfit Estudiantes on 24 July 2018.

== Career statistics ==
As of 3 January 2019.

Club statistics
Club	Season	League			Cup		Continental		Other		Total	
Club	Season	Division	Apps	Goals	Apps	Goals	Apps	Goals	Apps	Goals	Apps	Goals
River Plate	2012–13	Primera División	0	0	1	0	—		0	0	1	0
River Plate	2013–14	Primera División	0	0	0	0	0	0	0	0	0	0
River Plate	2014	Primera División	0	0	0	0	0	0	0	0	0	0
River Plate	Total		0	0	1	0	0	0	0	0	1	0
Barracas Central (loan)	2015	Primera B Metropolitana	3	0	0	0	—		0	0	3	0
Güemes	2016	Torneo Federal A	11	0	3	0	—		0	0	14	0
Güemes	2016 (C)	Torneo Federal B	16	3	0	0	—		0	0	16	3
Güemes	Total		27	3	0	0	—		0	0	27	3
Deportivo Paraguayo	2016–17	Primera D Metropolitana	15	2	0	0	—		0	0	15	2
San Jorge	2016–17	Torneo Federal A	8	0	0	0	—		0	0	8	0
San Jorge	2017–18	Torneo Federal A	1	0	0	0	—		0	0	1	0
San Jorge	Total		9	0	0	0	—		0	0	9	0
Estudiantes	2018–19	Torneo Federal A	7	0	0	0	—		0	0	7	0
Career total			61	5	4	0	0	0	0	0	65	5
