= Israel Escalante =

Argentine footballer (born 1999)

Personal information
- Full name: Israel Enoc Escalante
- Date of birth: 9 January 1999 (age 27)
- Place of birth: Vista Linda, Argentina
- Height: 1.74 m (5 ft 9 in)
- Position: Winger

Team information
- Current team: Municipal Limeno

Youth career
- 2014–2020: Boca Juniors

Senior career*
Years	Team	Apps	(Gls)
2020–2026	Boca Juniors	2	(0)
2020–2021	→ Independiente Medellín (loan)	11	(2)
2022	→ Alajuelense (loan)	13	(0)
2023–2024	→ Estudiantes de Río Cuarto (loan)	3	(0)
2025	→ Boca Unidos (loan)	6	(0)
2026-Present	Municipal Limeno		
- * Club domestic league appearances and goals as of 18 May 2025

Israel Enoc Escalante (born 9 January 1999) is an Argentine professional footballer who plays as a winger for Municipal Limeno.

== Career ==
Escalante joined Boca Juniors in 2014. He spent six years progressing through their ranks, before departing on loan in July 2020 to Categoría Primera A side Independiente Medellín. He made his senior debut under manager Aldo Bobadilla on 16 September, featuring for fifty-five minutes of a Copa Libertadores group stage defeat to Caracas; he came off the bench to replace Andrés Rodríguez in the first half. His first league match arrived days later versus Alianza Petrolera, which was followed by an appearance against parent club Boca in the Libertadores; he left at half time of a narrow loss.

Escalante scored his first senior goal on 8 October 2020 in a league win for Independiente Medellín over Cúcuta Deportivo, which was followed by another on 25 October at home to Deportivo Cali.

== Career statistics ==
As of 7 December 2020.

Appearances and goals by club, season and competition
Club	Season	League			Cup		League Cup		Continental		Other		Total	
Club	Season	Division	Apps	Goals	Apps	Goals	Apps	Goals	Apps	Goals	Apps	Goals	Apps	Goals
Boca Juniors	2020–21 (Note: Soccerway counts Copa de la Liga Profesional appearances as league appearances.)	Primera División	0	0	0	0	0	0	0	0	0	0	0	0
Independiente Medellín (loan)	2020	Categoría Primera A	10	2	0	0	—		2 (Note: Appearance(s) in the Copa Libertadores)	0	0	0	12	2
Liga Deportiva Alajuelense (loan)	2022	Liga FPD	1	0	0	0	—		0	0	0	0	1	0
Career total			11	2	0	0	0	0	2	0	0	0	13	2
