= Pollo Campestre =

Salvadoran fast food chain

- Type: Private
- Industry: Restaurants
- Founded: 1987; 39 years ago
- Founders: Mario Antonio Romero Salgado; Gloria Santos Guzmán
- Headquarters: 3ª Calle Poniente 1315, Col Ciudad Jardin 503 San Miguel, El Salvador
- Number of locations: 53 (2021)
- Area served: El Salvador
- Key people: Sergio Romero (General Director)
- Products: Fried chicken
- Number of employees: 2,000 (2021)
- Parent: Grupo Campestre, S.A de C.V.
- Website: pollocampestre.com

Pollo Campestre (literally "Countryside Chicken") is a fast food restaurant chain located in El Salvador. The restaurant specializes in serving fried chicken.

== History ==
Pollo Campestre was founded in San Miguel in 1987 by Mario Antonio Romero Salgado and Gloria Santos Guzmán. The couple established the company with only 150 colóns (equivalent to 17.14 US dollars) to support themselves and their three children during the Salvadoran Civil War.

Pollo Campestre's primary dish is fried chicken. Other food items served include eggs, beans, fried plantains, nachos, and cheese. Common drinks include coffee, orange juice, and sodas. Vanilla pancakes topped which whipped cream and strawberries are also offered as desserts.

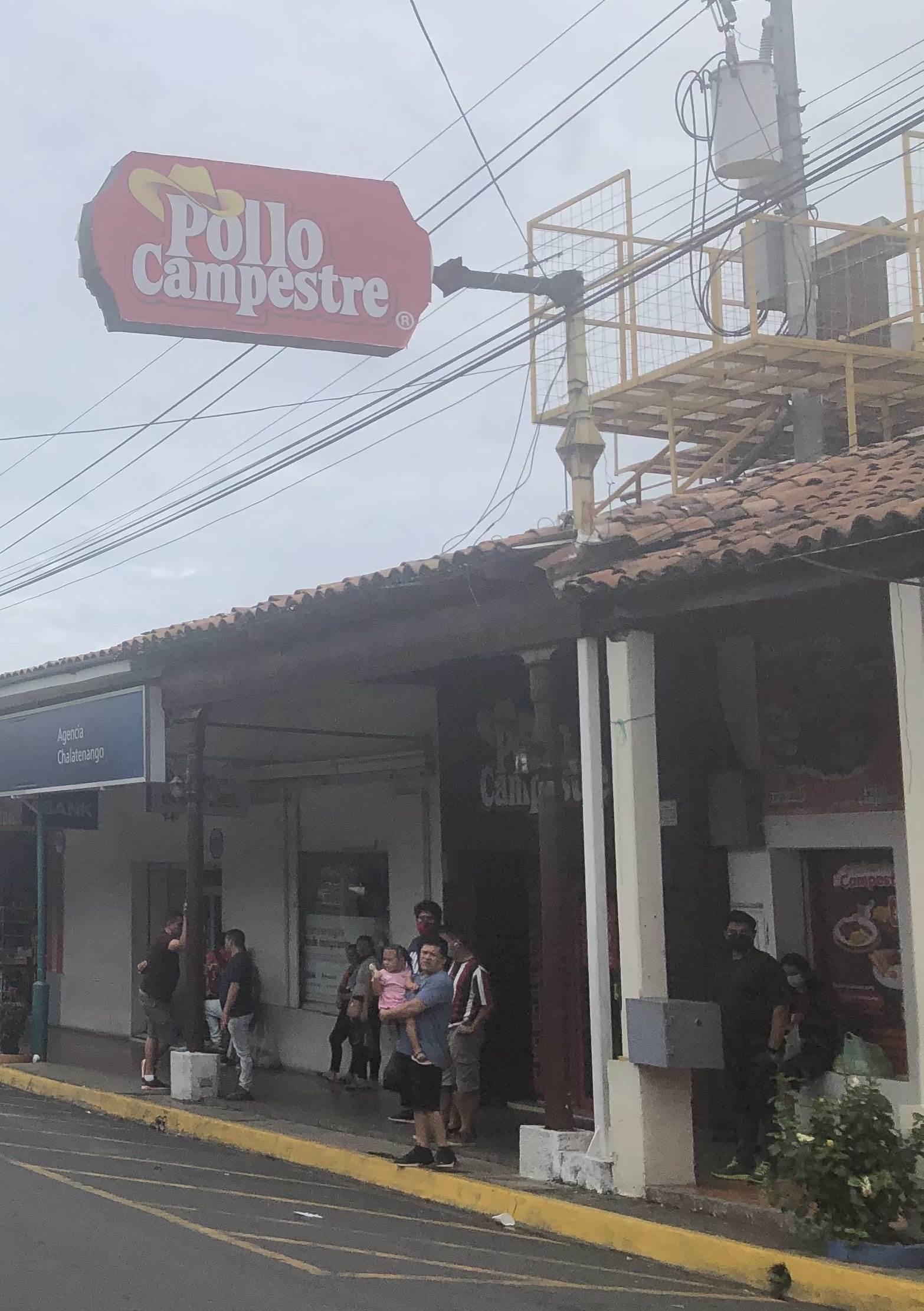
A location in Chalatenango

The restaurant has run a promotional campaign known as "Campestremanía 2x1" for three days in February 2016 and September 2020. The promotion offered customers two meals for the price of one. It promoted the 2019 Ilopango airshow by selling tickets at some locations. It has opened new locations, along with many other companies, in three new large shopping malls located in Nejapa in 2018, Apopa in 2020, and Aguilares in 2022.

== Corporate affairs ==
As of 2021, the restaurant had 2,000 employees working in 53 locations across El Salvador. Pollo Campestre is owned by Grupo Campestre, S.A de C.V., which also owns eight other companies: Avícola Campestre, Panadería Sinaí, Agrocampestre, Agropecuaria La Laguna, Recursos Humanos Excelentes de El Salvador, Hotelería y Turismo, and Alimentos para Llevar. Pollo Campestre receives 2,000 chickens per day from Avícola Campestre.

The restaurant describes itself as being "100% Salvadoran". Its mascot is an anthropomorphic chicken named "Pepe Pollo".

Pollo Campestre is an official sponsor of the Salvadoran football club C.D. Platense Municipal Zacatecoluca which competes in the Primera División.

== See also ==
- List of chicken restaurants
