= Federico Andrada =

Argentine footballer (born 1994)

Personal information
- Full name: Federico Oscar Andrada
- Date of birth: March 3, 1994 (age 32)
- Place of birth: Buenos Aires, Argentina
- Height: 1.80 m (5 ft 11 in)
- Position: Forward

Team information
- Current team: GV San José
- Number: 7

Youth career
- 2001–2012: River Plate

Senior career*
Years	Team	Apps	(Gls)
2012–2018	River Plate	20	(1)
2014–2015	→ Metz (loan)	14	(0)
2014–2015	→ Metz II (loan)	10	(1)
2015	→ Rafaela (loan)	5	(0)
2016–2017	→ Quilmes (loan)	43	(9)
2017–2018	→ Vélez Sarsfield (loan)	13	(2)
2018	Bari	3	(1)
2018–2019	Unión	11	(0)
2019–2021	Aldosivi	57	(12)
2022	Atlético Tucumán	12	(1)
2022	La Serena	15	(3)
2023	Real Unión	10	(1)
2023	Universidad Católica	9	(1)
2024	Aldosivi	7	(0)
2024	Racing Montevideo	9	(0)
2025	Carlos A. Mannucci	11	(1)
2025	GV San José	18	(5)
2026	Aguila	26	(12)
- * Club domestic league appearances and goals as of 9 August 2026

Federico Oscar Andrada (born 3 March 1994) is an Argentine footballer who plays for Bolivian side GV San José as a forward.

== Career ==
Andrada is a youth exponent from the club River Plate. He made his league debut at 3 June 2013 in a 2–0 away loss against Argentinos Juniors. He replaced Ariel Rojas after 86 minutes. He scored his first league goal on 10 August 2013 against Rosario Central.

In 2018 he moved to Italy and joined Serie B side Bari.

In 2022 he moved to Chile to join Primera División side Deportes La Serena.
