= Juan Vega =

Mexican footballer (born 1998)

Personal information
- Full name: Juan De Dios Vega De León
- Date of birth: 30 October 1998 (age 28)
- Place of birth: Tehuantepec, Oaxaca, Mexico
- Height: 1.71 m (5 ft 7 in)
- Position: Defender

Team information
- Current team: Chapulineros de Oaxaca
- Number: 3

Youth career
- 2014–2015: Tigrillos Dorados MRCI
- 2015–2017: Chapulineros de Oaxaca
- 2018: Monterrey

Senior career*
Years	Team	Apps	(Gls)
2015–2018	Oaxaca	3	(0)
2018–2022	Monterrey	0	(0)
2019–2020	→ Zacatecas (loan)	13	(0)
2020–2021	→ Atlético Morelia (loan)	36	(0)
2021–2022	→ Raya2 (loan)	25	(0)
2022–2023	Venados	34	(0)
2023	Orgullo Reynosa	12	(0)
2024	Atlético Morelia	10	(0)
2024	Deportiva Venados	14	(0)
2025	Racing de Veracruz	14	(0)
2025–	Chapulineros de Oaxaca	1	(0)
- * Club domestic league appearances and goals as of 26 August 2025

Juan De Dios Vega De León (born 30 October 1998) is a Mexican professional footballer who plays as a defender for Chapulineros de Oaxaca.
