= 2018–19 Primera División de El Salvador =

Primera División de El Salvador
- Season: 2018–19
- Champions: Santa Tecla (Apertura); Aguila (Clausura)
- Relegated: Firpo
- CONCACAF League: Santa Tecla; Aguila; Alianza
- Top goalscorer: TBD (TBD)
- Biggest home win: Alianza 7–0 Chalatenango December, 2018
- Longest winning run: games by: TBD
- Longest unbeaten run: games by: TBD
- Longest winless run: games by: TBD
- Longest losing run: games by: TBD
- All statistics correct as of 31 December 2018.

The 2018–19 Primera División de El Salvador (also known as the Liga Pepsi) is the 20th season and 39th and 40th Primera División tournament, El Salvador's top football division, since its establishment of an Apertura and Clausura format. Alianza F.C. are the defending champions of both Apertura and Clausura tournaments. The league will consist of 12 teams. There will be two seasons conducted under identical rules, with each team playing a home and away game against the other clubs for a total of 22 games per tournament. At the end of each half-season tournament, the top eight teams in that tournament's regular season standings will take part in the playoffs.

The champions of Apertura or Clausura with the better aggregate record will qualify for the 2020 CONCACAF Champions League. The other champion, and the runner-up with the better aggregate record will qualify for the 2019 CONCACAF League. Should the same team win both tournaments, both runners-up will qualify for CONCACAF League. Should the final of both tournaments features the same 2 teams, the semifinalist with the better aggregate record will qualify for CONCACAF League.

== Teams ==
Location of the 2018–19 Liga Nacional de Fútbol de Guatemala teams

A total of 12 teams will contest the league, including 11 sides from the 2017–18 Primera División and 1 promoted from the 2017–18 Segunda División.

Dragon were relegated to 2018–19 Segunda División the previous season.

The relegated team was replaced by the 2017–18 Segunda División playoffs promotion winner. Jocoro F.C. won the Apertura 2017 and Clausura 2018 title, meaning there was no need for a promotion playoff and were promoted automatically.

=== Promotion and relegation ===
Promoted from Segunda División de Fútbol Salvadoreño as of June, 2018.

- Champions: Jocoro F.C.

Relegated to Segunda División de Fútbol Salvadoreño as of June, 2018.

- Last Place: Dragon

=== Personnel and sponsoring ===
Team	Chairman	Head Coach	Captain	Kitmaker	Shirt Sponsors
Águila	(El Salvador) Jose Alexander Menjivar	(El Salvador) Carlos Romero	(El Salvador) Benji Villalobos	Maca	Mister Donut, Canal 4, Pollo Campesto, Pilsener
Alianza	(El Salvador) Adolfo Salume	(El Salvador) Jorge Rodríguez	(El Salvador) TBD	Umbro	Canal 4, Mister Donut, Tigo, Gatorade, Veca airlines, Brahva
Audaz	(El Salvador) Roberto Campos	(Uruguay) Pablo Quiñonez	(El Salvador) Carlos Monteagudo	Rush Atletics	Claro,
Chalatenango	(El Salvador) Rigoberto Mejia	(El Salvador) Alvaro Misael Alfaro	(El Salvador) TBD	Nil	Lemus, Premiun Center, Arjona Import & Export Co
Jocoro F.C.	(El Salvador) Leonel Hernández	(Paraguay) Cristóbal Cubilla	(El Salvador) Giuviny Esquivel	Milan	Haciendo Regalo de Dios, Caja de Credito Jocoro
FAS	(El Salvador) Guillermo Moran	(El Salvador) Erick Dowson Prado	(El Salvador) Néstor Raúl Renderos	Joma	Pilsener, Tigo, Canal 4, Hospital Cader, Sol
Firpo	(El Salvador) Modesto Torres	(El Salvador) Asdrúbal Flores	(El Salvador) Edwin Martinez	Galaxia	Pilsener, KTOR Sports, Lacteos Velatoro
Isidro Metapán	(El Salvador) Rafael Morataya	(Peru) Agustin Castillo	(El Salvador) Milton Molina	Milan	Canal 4, Arroz de San Pedro, Agroamigo, Morataya
Limeño	(El Salvador) Martín Herrera	(El Salvador) William Renderos Iraheta	(El Salvador) Francisco Jovel Álvarez	Nil	UNAB (Universidad Dr. Andres Berello), Chilos Seafood Restaurant, TuriTravel, Disturbidora Torres, Innova sport
Pasaquina	(El Salvador) Óscar Ramírez	(Brazil) Eraldo Correia	(El Salvador) Isaac Zelaya	Nil	Canal 4, Innova sport
Sonsonate	(El Salvador) Pedro Contreras	(El Salvador) Nelson Ancheta	(El Salvador) Christian Sánchez	Milan	ProACES, Aldasa, Alcadia Municipal Sonsonate, Canal 4, Leche salud, Ferreteria Santa Sofia, Coop-1
Santa Tecla	(El Salvador) José Vidal Hernández	(Argentina) Christian Díaz	(El Salvador) Gerson Mayen	Kelme	Powerade, DLC, Canal 21, Pilsener, Claro, Plaza Merliot, Pollo Indio, Petrox, Dizucar, Bolívar, Toledo, The Moustache

== Notable events ==
=== Change of Ownership of Aguila ===
The Grupo Aguila Deportivo, SA de CV announced in June, 2018 that they were selling their operating rights for Aguila, on the 6th of July a new group under Adolfo Salume (Club Social Águila) had purchased Aguila from the Arieta group (Grupo Aguila Deportivo) for undisclosed fees.

=== Pasaquina and Audaz moving stadium ===
Pasaquina announced that due to their home stadium not meeting new CONCACAF standards and minimal crowd numbers, they would play their home games at La Union stadium. Audaz also announced that they would play some games away from Estadio Jiboa.

=== New ball sponsorship for the league ===
The league signed a new deal with Mexican company Voit to provide the balls used in the national league, replacing Nike.

=== Change of Ownership of Audaz ===
The Audaz Apasteque group announced in January, 2018 that they were selling their operating rights for Audaz, on the 6th of July a new group under Roberto Campos had purchased Audaz from the Juan Pablo Herrera group for undisclosed fees.

=== Deduction of Points ===
Audaz attempted to play in unapproved jersey, despite on the spot modification being done, referee abandoned the game and FESFUT decided to award the match to a 2-0 forfeit win to Isidro Metapan.

On February 27, 2019 C.D. Municipal Limeno, Jocoro F.C. and C.D. Pasaquina were deducted six points due to failing to sign the right paperwork for their respective under 17 teams to compete in the tournament.

=== Notable death from Apertura 2018 season and 2019 Clausura season ===
The following people associated with the Primera Division have died in end of 2018 and mid 2019.

- David Antonio Platero
- Didier Gutiérrez
- Darwin Alcides Melgar
- José Vidal Hernández
- Mauricio Ernesto González
- Tulio Quiros

== Managerial changes ==
=== Before the start of the season ===
Team	Outgoing manager	Manner of departure	Date of vacancy	Replaced by	Date of appointment	Position in table
Firpo	(El Salvador) Giovanni Trigueros	Contract finished	May 2018	(El Salvador) Jorge Calles	May 2018	7th & Quarterfinalist (Clausura 2018)
Santa Tecla	(Uruguay) Ruben da Silva	Mutual consent	May 2018	(Argentina) Christian Díaz	June 2018	2nd & runners-up (Clausura 2018)
Sonsonate	(El Salvador) Juan Ramón Sánchez	contract not renewed	June 2018	(El Salvador) Juan Ramon Paredes	June 2018	8th (Quarterfinal)
Jocoro	(Argentina) Emiliano Barrera	Resigned	June 2018	(El Salvador) Nelson Ancheta	June 2018	Newly Promoted (N/A)
Pasaquina	(El Salvador) Francisco Robles	Contract not renewed	June 2018	(Brazil) Eraldo Correia	June 2018	8th (Quarterfinal)
Chalatenango	(El Salvador) Geovanni Portillo	Interim finished	April 2018	(Argentina) Ángel Piazzi	June 2018	10th (Clausura 2018)
FAS	(El Salvador) Cristian Álvarez	Moved to become Under 17 coach	June 2018	(Colombia) Álvaro de Jesús Gómez	June 2018	4th & Quarterfinalist (Clausura 2018)
Aguila	(El Salvador) Miguel Obando	Contract finished	June 2018	(El Salvador) Carlos Romero	July 2018	3rd & Semifinalist (Clausura 2018)
Audaz	(El Salvador) Carlos Romero	Resigned	June 2018	(Honduras) German Perez	July 2018	6th & Semifinalist (Clausura 2018)

=== During the Apertura season ===
Team	Outgoing manager	Manner of departure	Date of vacancy	Replaced by	Date of appointment	Position in table
Sonsonate	(El Salvador) Juan Ramon Paredes	Contract not approved by federation, therefore could not coach the club	August 2018	(El Salvador) Mario Elias Guevara	August 2018	12th (Apertura 2018)
Audaz	(Honduras) German Perez	Sacked, move to become the assistant manager	September 2018	(El Salvador) William Renderos Iraheta	September 2018	11th (Apertura 2018)
Sonsonate	(El Salvador) Mario Elias Guevara	Sacked	September 2018	(Paraguay) Hugo Olevar	September 2018	9th (Apertura 2018)
FAS	(Colombia) Álvaro de Jesús Gómez	Resigned due to family reasons	September 2018	(El Salvador) Erick Dowson Prado (Interim)	September 2018	5th (Apertura 2018)
Chalatenango	(Argentina) Ángel Piazzi	Resigned	October 2018	(El Salvador) Geovani Portillo (interim)	October 2018	9th (Apertura 2018)
Firpo	(El Salvador) Jorge Calles	Resigned	October 2018	(El Salvador) Asdrúbal Flores	October 2018	12th (Apertura 2018)
Chalatenango	(El Salvador) Geovani Portillo (Interim)	Interimship finished	October 2018	(El Salvador) Alvaro Misael Alfaro	October 2018	8th (Apertura 2018)
Limeno	(El Salvador) Victor Coreas	Sacked	October 2018	(El Salvador) Omar Sevilla	October 2018	9th (Apertura 2018)

=== Between Apertura and Clausura seasons ===
Team	Outgoing manager	Manner of departure	Date of vacancy	Replaced by	Date of appointment	Position in table
Jocoro	(El Salvador) Nelson Ancheta	Resigned	December 2018	(Paraguay) Cristóbal Cubilla	December 2018	10th (Apertura 2018)
Sonsonate	(Paraguay) Hugo Olevar	Contract finished	December 2018	(El Salvador) Nelson Ancheta	December 2018	11th (Apertura 2018)
Isidro Metapan	(Peru) Agustin Castillo	Sacked	December 2018	(El Salvador) Edwin Portillo	December 2018	5th (Apertura 2018)
Limeno	(El Salvador) Omar Sevilla	Sacked	December 2018	(El Salvador) William Renderos Iraheta	December 2018	7th (Apertura 2018)
Audaz	(El Salvador) William Renderos Iraheta	Resigned	December 2018	(Uruguay) Pablo Quiñonez	January 2019	6th (Apertura 2018)

=== During the Clausura season ===
Team	Outgoing manager	Manner of departure	Date of vacancy	Replaced by	Date of appointment	Position in table
Firpo	(El Salvador) Asdrúbal Flores	Sacked	February 2019	(Argentina) Carlos Alberto de Toro	February 2019	10th (Clausura 2019)
Sonsonate	(El Salvador) Nelson Ancheta	Sacked	February 2019	(El Salvador) Omar Pimentel (Interim)	February 2019	10th (Clausura 2019)
Pasaquina	(Brazil) Eraldo Correia	Resigned, due to lack of payments	February 2019	(El Salvador) Jose Manuel Romero	February 2019	6th (Clausura 2019)
Jocoro	(Paraguay) Cristóbal Cubilla	Mutual Agreement	February 2019	(El Salvador) Guillermo Rivera	February 2019	9th (Clausura 2019)
Sonsonate	(El Salvador) Omar Pimentel	Interimship ended	March 2019	(Uruguay) Rubén da Silva	March 2019	11th (Clausura 2019)
Santa Tecla	(Argentina) Christian Díaz	Resigned	April 2019	(El Salvador) Rodolfo Gochez (Interim)	April 2019	6th (Clausura 2019)
Santa Tecla	(El Salvador) Rodolfo Gochez	Caretaker role finished	April 2019	(Uruguay) Sebastian Abreu	April 2019	6th (Clausura 2019)

== Apertura ==
=== League table ===
Pos	Team	Pld	W	D	L	GF	GA	GD	Pts	Qualification or relegation
1	Alianza	22	14	7	1	44	16	+28	49	Advance to Playoffs
2	Santa Tecla	22	12	7	3	33	18	+15	43	Advance to Playoffs
3	Águila	22	11	4	7	39	24	+15	37	Advance to Playoffs
4	FAS	22	9	6	7	23	17	+6	33	Advance to Playoffs
5	Isidro Metapán	22	8	7	7	26	25	+1	31	Advance to Playoffs
6	Audaz	22	8	7	7	23	26	−3	31	Advance to Playoffs
7	Municipal Limeño	22	5	11	6	28	32	−4	26	Advance to Playoffs
8	Chalatenango	22	7	5	10	24	30	−6	26	Advance to Playoffs
9	Pasaquina	22	6	7	9	26	31	−5	25	
10	Jocoro	22	4	11	7	25	28	−3	23	
11	Sonsonate	22	3	9	10	16	31	−15	18	
12	Firpo	22	3	3	16	17	46	−29	12	

Source: Soccerway
Rules for classification: 1) points; 2) goal difference; 3) number of goals scored.

=== Results ===
Home \ Away	ÁGU	ALI	AUD	CHA	FAS	FIR	MET	JOC	LIM	PAS	STE	SON
Águila		1–2	0–1	1–0	0–2	3–0	4–0	1–2	1–1	3–1	1–0	4–0
Alianza	3–1		2–1	3–0	0–0	1–0	1–0	2–1	0–0	4–1	1–1	1–0
Audaz	0–4	1–1		4–0	0–1	2–1	0–0	0–0	1–1	2–1	1–0	0–0
Chalatenango	1–1	0–1	2–0		0–0	1–0	1–0	2–2	1–0	0–1	1–2	1–2
C.D. FAS	0–1	0–4	0–1	4–1		4–0	0–1	2–1	2–3	1–0	3–1	1–0
Firpo	1–3	0–5	0–2	0–2	0–1		3–4	2–3	1–1	2–1	1–1	2–2
Isidro Metapán	5–1	1–1	1–2	3–1	0–0	2–0		0–0	0–1	3–1	1–3	1–1
Jocoro	0–0	1–1	1–1	1–3	1–1	3–1	0–0		3–4	0–2	1–1	0–1
Limeño	0–4	3–3	1–0	2–2	1–0	1–2	1–2	1–1		1–1	2–3	1–1
Pasaquina	2–2	0–2	4–1	1–1	1–1	1–0	3–0	0–3	1–1		0–1	0–0
Santa Tecla	2–1	2–1	3–0	1–0	1–0	3–0	1–1	2–0	1–1	2–2		2–0
Sonsonate	1–2	2–5	3–3	1–4	0–0	0–1	0–1	0–0	1–0	1–2	0–0	

Legend: Blue = home team win; Yellow = draw; Red = away team win.

==== Records ====
- Best home records: Santa Tecla F.C. and Alianza F.C. (27 points out of 33 points)
- Worst home records: C.D. Luis Angel Firpo (6 points out of 33 points)
- best away records : Alianza F.C. (22 points out of 33 points)
- worst away records : C.D. Luis Angel Firpo (6 points out of 33 points)
- Most goals scored: Alianza F.C. (44 goals)
- Fewest goals scored: C.D. Sonsonate (16 goals)
- Fewest goals conceded : Alianza F.C. (16 goals)
- Most goals conceded : C.D. Luis Angel Firpo (46 goals)

=== Top goalscorers ===
As of 25 November 2018

Rank	Player	Club	Goals
1	(El Salvador) Rodolfo Zelaya	Alianza	14
2	(Uruguay) Waldemar Acosta	Águila	12
2	(Argentina) Ramiro Iván Rocca	Chalatenango	11
4	(Honduras) Clayvin Zúniga	Municipal Limeño	10
5	(Colombia) Jeison Quiñones	Pasaquina	8
5	(Brazil) Ricardinho	Santa Tecla	8
5	(Brazil) Zé Paulo	Isidro Metapán	8
8	(Colombia) Bladimir Díaz	Alianza	7
9	(El Salvador) Nelson Alvarenga	Jocoro	6
9	(El Salvador) Édgar Cruz	Jocoro	6
9	(El Salvador) Santos Guzmán	Audaz	6
9	(El Salvador) Wilma Torres	Santa Tecla	6
9	(Uruguay) Joaquín Vergés	Águila	6

==== Scoring ====
- First goal of the season: (El Salvador) Ronald Rodríguez for Aguila against Sonsonate, 9 minutes (July 28, 2018)
- First goal by a foreign player: (Uruguay) Joaquín Vergés for Aguila against Sonsonate, 36 minutes (July 28, 2018)
- Fastest goal in a match: 2 minutes
  - (Colombia) Bladimir Diaz for Alianza against Chalatenango (September 17, 2018)
- Goal scored at the latest point in a match: 90 minutes
  - (El Salvador) Juan Barahona goal for Santa Tecla against Audaz (28 July 2018)
- First penalty Kick of the season: (Brazil) Ricardinho for Santa Tecla against Audaz, 35 minutes (July 28, 2018)
- Widest winning margin: 5 goals
  - Alianza 5–0 Luis Ángel Firpo (2018)
- First hat-trick of the season: Christopher Ramirez for Luis Ángel Firpo against Isidro Metapán (August 18, 2018)
- First own goal of the season: (El Salvador) TBA (TBD) for TBD (February 19, 2018)
- Most goals in a match: 7 goals
  - Luis Ángel Firpo 3-4 Isidro Metapán (August 18, 2018)
- Most goals by one team in a match: 5 goals
  - Alianza 5–0 Luis Ángel Firpo (2018)
- Most goals in one half by one team: 4 goals
  - FAS 4-0 (4–0) Luis Ángel Firpo (2nd half, August, 2018)
- Most goals scored by losing team: 3 goals
  - Jocoro 3–4 Municipal Limeño (September 15, 2018)
- Most goals by one player in a single match: 3 goals
  - (El Salvador) Christopher Ramirez for Luis Ángel Firpo against Isidro Metapán (August 18, 2018)
  - (Mexico) Ulises Tavares for Sonsonate against Audaz (September, 2018)
  - (Honduras) Clayvin Zúniga for Limeno against Jocoro (September 15, 2018)
  - (El Salvador) Rodolfo Zelaya for Alianza against Aguila (September, 2018)

=== Playoffs ===
==== Quarterfinals ====
Team 1	Agg.	Team 2	1st leg	2nd leg
Isidro Metapán	0–2	FAS	0–0	2–0
Audaz	3–4	Águila	2–2	2–1
Limeño	2–3	Santa Tecla	0–1	2–2
Chalatenango	0–7	Alianza	0–0	7–0

===== First leg =====
November 28, 2018
13:30 UTC−6

Audaz	2–2	Águila
Eduardo Rodríguez 66'; Hayner Caicedo 81'		Joaquín Vergés 54'; Ronald Rodríguez 63'

Estadio Jiboa
San Vicente
Referee: Marlon Mejia

November 28, 2018
17:45 UTC−6

Isidro Metapán	0–0	FAS
Nil		Nil

Estadio Jorge Calero Suárez
Metapán
Referee: Edgar Ramirez

November 28, 2018
17:45 UTC−6

Municipal Limeño	0–1	Santa Tecla
Nil		Ricardinho 12'

Estadio Jose Ramon Flores
Santa Rosa de Lima
Referee: Jaime Herrera Bonilla

November 29, 2018
17:00 UTC−6

Chalatenango	0–0	Alianza
Nil		Nil

Estadio José Gregorio Martínez,
Chalatenango

===== Second leg =====
December 1, 2018
15:15 UTC−6

Águila	2–1	Audaz
Diego Coca 8'; Ricardo Guevara 50'		Eduardo Rodríguez 44'

Estadio Juan Francisco Barraza
San Miguel
Referee: Hector Salazar

Aguila won 4-3 on aggregate.

December 1, 2018
17:30 UTC−6

Santa Tecla	2–2	Municipal Limeño
Ricardinho 33'; Wilma Torres 85'		Clayvin Zúniga 49'; Christopher Galeas 91'

Estadio Las Delicias
Santa Tecla
Referee: Jaime Carpio

Santa Tecla won 3-2 on aggregate.

December 2, 2018
15:00 UTC−6

FAS	2–0	Isidro Metapán
Tony Rugamas 14'; Dustin Corea 46'		Nil

Estadio Simeón Magaña
Ahuachapán

FAS won 2-0 on aggregate.

December 2, 2018
15:15 UTC−6

Alianza	7–0	Chalatenango
Portillo 8'; Bladimir Diaz 14'; Narciso Orellana 70'; Rodolfo Zelaya 68' 86' 87' 91'		Nil

Estadio Cuscatlán
San Salvador

Alianza won 7-0 on aggregate.

==== Semifinals ====
Team 1	Agg.	Team 2	1st leg	2nd leg
Aguila	2-5	Santa Tecla	2-3	2-0
FAS	2-2 (s)	Alianza	0-0	2-2

===== First leg =====
December 5, 2018
15:15 UTC−6

Aguila	2-3	Santa Tecla
Yosimar Quiñones own goal 3'; David Díaz 90'		Yosimar Quiñones 53'; Ricardinho 63'; Jairo Henriquez 86'

Estadio Juan Francisco Barraza

December 6, 2018
19:30 UTC−6

FAS	0-0	Alianza
Nil		Nil

Estadio Cuscatlan, San Salvador

===== Second leg =====
December 9, 2018
18:00 UTC−6

Santa Tecla	2-0	Aguila
Juan Barahona 36'; Rodrigo Rivera 62'		Nil

Estadio Las Delicias, Santa Tecla
Referee: GermanMartinez

Santa Tecla won 5-2 on aggregate.

December 8, 2017
19:30 UTC−6

Alianza	2-2	FAS
José Ángel Peña 81' 92'		Victor Montaño 23'; Dustin Corea 67'

Estadio Cuscatlan, San Salvador

2-2. Alianza advanced as the higher seeded team.

==== Final ====
December 16, 2018
15:00 UTC−6

Alianza	1-2	Santa Tecla
Rodolfo Zelaya 69'	[]	Wilma Torres 50' 88'

Estadio Cuscatlán, San Salvador
Attendance: TBD
Referee: Joel Aguilar Chicas

Alianza F.C.
GK	1	(Uruguay) Víctor García
DF	12	(El Salvador) Rubén Marroquín
DF	20	(Uruguay) Darío Ferreira	(yellow card) 86'
DF	4	(El Salvador) Ivan Mancía	(yellow card) 22'
DF	15	(El Salvador) Jonathan Jiménez
MF	21	(El Salvador) Marvin Monterrosa
MF	9	(El Salvador) Óscar Cerén
MF	27	(El Salvador) Issac Portillo	(yellow card) 31'
MF	17	(El Salvador) Marlon Cornejo		(substituted off) 64'
FW	14	(El Salvador) Herbert Sosa		(substituted off) 81'
ST	22	(El Salvador) Rodolfo Zelaya		93 69'
Substitutes:
FW	22	(El Salvador) José Ángel Peña		(substituted on) 81'
FW	10	(El Salvador) Juan Carlos Portillo		(substituted on) 64'
Manager:
(El Salvador) Jorge Humberto Rodriguez

Santa Tecla F.C.
GK	1	(Mexico) Joel Almeida
DF	5	(El Salvador) Juan Barahona
DF	23	(El Salvador) Alexander Mendoza	(yellow card) 23'
DF	19	(El Salvador) Bryan Tamacas
MF	20	(El Salvador) Rodrigo Rivera
MF	31	(El Salvador) Gerson Mayen
MF	43	(El Salvador) Kevin Santamaria		(substituted off) 83'
MF	21	(El Salvador) Wilma Torres 50' 88' 93
FW	11	(El Salvador) Gilberto Baires		(substituted off) 91'
FW	22	(Brazil) Ricardinho
FW	7	(Colombia) Elisener Quinones	(yellow card) 14'
Substitutes:
MF	10	(El Salvador) Jairo Herniquez		(substituted on) 83'
FW	14	(El Salvador) Kevin Reyes		(substituted on) 92'
MF	33	(El Salvador) Giovanni Avila		(substituted on) 91'
Manager:
(Argentina) Christian Díaz

Apertura 2018 champions

4th title

== Clausura ==
=== League table ===
Pos	Team	Pld	W	D	L	GF	GA	GD	Pts	Qualification or relegation
1	Alianza	22	15	4	3	49	16	+33	49	Advance to Playoffs
2	Águila	22	11	8	3	27	14	+13	41	Advance to Playoffs
3	Isidro Metapán	22	9	7	6	30	23	+7	34	Advance to Playoffs
4	Municipal Limeño	22	10	8	4	23	17	+6	32 (Note: Municipal Limeño were deducted 6 points.)	Advance to Playoffs
5	Chalatenango	22	8	7	7	19	22	−3	31	Advance to Playoffs
6	Santa Tecla	22	7	9	6	29	30	−1	30	Advance to Playoffs
7	FAS	22	7	8	7	21	19	+2	29	Advance to Playoffs
8	Pasaquina	22	6	8	8	23	31	−8	20 (Note: Pasaquina were deducted 6 points.)	Advance to Playoffs
9	Audaz	22	5	4	13	20	31	−11	19	
10	Firpo	22	4	7	11	16	31	−15	19	
11	Sonsonate	22	4	6	12	26	39	−13	18	
12	Jocoro	22	4	8	10	16	26	−10	14 (Note: Jocoro were deducted 6 points.)	

Source: Soccerway
Rules for classification: 1) points; 2) goal difference; 3) number of goals scored.

=== Results ===
Home \ Away	ÁGU	ALI	AUD	CHA	FAS	FIR	MET	JOC	LIM	PAS	STE	SON
Águila		0–0	1–0	1–0	0–0	1–0	1–1	2–1	1–0	4–1	1–1	5–0
Alianza	2–0		6–2	5–2	1–0	5–0	2–0	3–1	4–0	1–2	3–2	3–0
Audaz	2–0	0–1		0–0	0–0	1–2	0–2 (Note: FESFUT decided to award the match to Metapan against Audaz as a 2–0 forfeit win after Audaz wore unapproved jersey)	1–2	1–1	2–3	3–0	1–4
Chalatenango	1–0	2–0	1–0		1–0	1–4	1–0	1–2	1–1	2–0	0–2	1–1
C.D. FAS	1–1	1–1	0–1	2–0		2–1	0–3	0–0	2–1	1–0	0–1	1–1
Firpo	0–1	1–4	0–0	0–0	0–4		1–2	0–0	1–2	0–1	1–1	1–0
Isidro Metapán	1–1	1–0	2–1	0–0	0–1	0–0		4–1	0–1	2–2	3–1	3–2
Jocoro	0–0	1–2	1–2	0–1	0–1	0–1	0–1		0–0	0–0	1–1	1–1
Limeño	0–1	1–1	1–0	1–0	1–1	3–1	0–0	2–0		1–0	1–0	2–0
Pasaquina	0–2	0–0	1–0	1–1	1–1	1–0	3–3	2–3	1–1		0–3	2–1
Santa Tecla	2–2	0–4	2–1	1–1	1–0	1–1	3–1	1–1	0–1	2–2		3–2
Sonsonate	1–2	0–1	1–2	1–2	4–3	1–1	2–1	0–1	2–2	1–0	1–1	

Updated to match(es) played on 21 April 2019. Source:
Legend: Blue = home team win; Yellow = draw; Red = away team win.

==== Records ====
- Best home records: Alianza F.C. (30 points out of 33 points)
- Worst home records: Jocoro F.C. (5 points out of 33 points)
- Best away records : Alianza F.C. (19 points out of 33 points)
- Worst away records : C.D. Sonsonate (6 points out of 33 points)
- Most goals scored: Alianza F.C. (49 goals)
- Fewest goals scored: Jocoro F.C. and C.D. Luis Angel Firpo (16 goals)
- Fewest goals conceded : C.D. Aguila (14 goals)
- Most goals conceded : C.D. Sonsonate (39 goals)

=== Top goalscorers ===
As of 6 May 2019

No.	Player	Club	Goals
1	(Colombia) Bladimir Diaz	Alianza	16
2	(Panama) Armando Polo	Sonsonate	13
3	(Colombia) Jeison Quinonez	Pasaquina	13
4	(Brazil) Ricardinho	Isidro Metapan	8
5	(El Salvador) Dustin Corea	FAS	7
6	(El Salvador) Ricardo Guevara	Aguila	7
7	(El Salvador) Juan Carlos Portillo	Alianza	7
8	(Colombia) James Cabeszas	Municipal Limeno	6
9	(El Salvador) Oscar Ceren	Alianza	6
10	(El Salvador) David Rugamas	FAS	6

==== Scoring ====
- First goal of the season: (Uruguay) Joaquin Verges for Aguila against Jocoro, 4 minutes (13 January 2019)
- First goal by a foreign player: (Uruguay) Joaquin Verges for Aguila against Jocoro, 4 minutes (13 January 2019)
- Fastest goal in a match: 2 minutes
  - (El Salvador) Ivan Mancia for Alianza against Metapan (24 February 2019)
- Goal scored at the latest point in a match: 90+2 minutes
  - (El Salvador) Juan Jose Hernandez goal for Jocoro against Santa Tecla (January 24, 2019)
- First penalty Kick of the season: (Uruguay) Joaquin Verges for Aguila against Jocoro, 4 minutes (13 January 2019)
- Widest winning margin: 5 goals
  - Alianza 5–0 Firpo (February, 2019)
- First hat-trick of the season: (Colombia) Bladimir Diaz for Alianza against Limeno (January 20, 2019)
- First own goal of the season: (El Salvador) TBA (TBD) for TBD (February 19, 2018)
- Most goals in a match: 8 goals
  - Alianza 6-2 Audaz (April 8, 2019)
- Most goals by one team in a match: 6 goals
  - Alianza 6-2 Audaz (April 8, 2019)
- Most goals in one half by one team: 3 goals
  - Metapan 3-1 (3-3) Pasaquina (2nd half, January 24, 2019)
    Alianza 3-0 (4-0) Limeno (2nd half, January 20, 2019)
- Most goals scored by losing team: 3 goals
  - FAS 3–4 Sonsonate (2019)
- Most goals by one player in a single match: 4 goals
  - (El Salvador) Dustin Corea for FAS against Firpo (March 16, 2019)
- Players that scored a hat-trick':
  - (Colombia) Bladimir Diaz for Alianza against Limeno (January 20, 2019)
  - (El Salvador) Dustin Corea for FAS against Firpo (March 16, 2019)
  - (Colombia) Bladimir Diaz for Alianza against Audaz (April 8, 2019)
  - (El Salvador) Ricardo Guevara for Aguila against Sonsonate (April 13, 2019)

=== Playoffs ===
Quarterfinals
1	Alianza	3	2	5
8	Pasaquina	0	0	0
4	Municipal Limeño	1	0	1
5	Chalatenango	0	1	1
2	Águila	2	2	4
7	FAS	3	1	4
3	Isidro Metapán	1	2	3
6	Santa Tecla	0	1	1

Semifinals
Alianza	2	0	2
Municipal Limeño	2	0	2
Águila	2	2	4
Isidro Metapán	0	0	0

Finals
Alianza	0 (1)
Águila	0 (3)

==== Quarterfinals ====
===== First leg =====
May 9, 2019
13:30 UTC−6

Chalatenango	0-1	Municipal Limeño
Nil		Clayvin Zuniga 78'

Estadio José Gregorio Martínez,
Chalatenango
Referee: Jaime Carpio

May 9, 2019
17:45 UTC−6

FAS	3-2	Águila
Dustin Corea 40' 77'; Victor Garcia 42'		Kevin Reyes 13'; Walter Chiguila 80'

Estadio Cuscatlan
San Salvador
Referee: Joel Aguilar

May 10, 2019
17:45 UTC−6

Santa Tecla	0–1	Isidro Metapán
Nil		Ricardinho 44'

Estadio Cuscatlan
San Salvador
Referee: Giovanni Corona

May 10, 2019
17:00 UTC−6

Pasaquina	0–3	Alianza
Nil		Portillo 17'; Oscar Ceren 26'; Bladimir Diaz 34'

Estadio Cuscatlan
San Salvador
Referee: German Martinez

===== Second leg =====
December 1, 2018
15:15 UTC−6

Águila	2–1	FAS
Waldemir Acosta 8'; Ortíz 61'		Guillermo Stradella 58'

Estadio Juan Francisco Barraza
San Miguel
Referee: Jaime Bonilla

4-4, Aguila won as highest seeded team.

December 5, 2019
17:30 UTC−6

Isidro Metapán	2–1	Santa Tecla
Marvin Figueroa 48'; David Diaz 77'		Erick Rivera 27'

Estadio Jorge Calero Suarez
Metapan
Referee: Edgar Ramirez

Isidro Metapan won 3-2 on aggregate.

May 13, 2018

Municipal Limeño	0-1	Chalatenango
Nil		Cesar Flores 16'

Estadio Ramon Flores Berrios
Santa Rosa de Lima
Referee: Elmer Martinez

1-1, Limeno won as highest seeded team.

May 13, 2019

Alianza	2–0	Pasaquina
Diego Benitez 81'; Jose Pena 91'		Nil

Estadio Cuscatlán
San Salvador
Referee: Hector Salazar

Alianza won 5-0 on aggregate.

==== Semifinals ====
===== First leg =====
May 15, 2019
15:15 UTC−6

Isidro Metapan	0-2	Aguila
Nil		Waldemar Acosta 27' 83'

Estadio Jorge Calero Suárez

May 15, 2019
19:30 UTC−6

Limeno	2-2	Alianza
Christopher Galeas 40'; Clayvin Zuniga 46'		Oscar Ceren 2' 70'

Estadio Jose Ramon Flores Berrios
Referee: German Martinez

===== Second leg =====
May 15, 2019
15:15 UTC−6

Aguila	2-0	Isidro Metapan
Waldemar Acosta 27'; Walter Ayala 49'		Nil

Estadio Juan Francisco Barraza
Referee: Hector Salazar

Aguila won 4-0 on aggregate.

May 15, 2019
19:30 UTC−6

Limeno	0-0	Alianza
Nil		Nil

Estadio Cuscatlán
Referee: German Martinez

2-2, Alianza won as highest seeded team.

==== Final ====
May 26, 2019
15:00 UTC−6

Alianza	0-0	Aguila
Nil		Nil
Penalties
Ivan Mancia (penalty scored); Herbert Sosa (penalty missed); Marvin Monterrosa (penalty missed); Jiménez (penalty missed)	1-3	Jefferson Polío (penalty scored); Andrés Quejada (penalty missed); Kevin Reyes (penalty scored); Ricardo Guevara (penalty missed); Waldemar Acosta (penalty scored)

Estadio Cuscatlán, San Salvador
Attendance: TBD
Referee: Ismael Cornejo

Alianza F.C.
GK	1	(Uruguay) Víctor García
DF	12	(El Salvador) Rubén Marroquín		(substituted off) 111'
DF	16	(El Salvador) Henry Romero
DF	4	(El Salvador) Ivan Mancía
DF	15	(El Salvador) Jonathan Jiménez	(yellow card) 22'
MF	21	(El Salvador) Marvin Monterrosa
MF	6	(El Salvador) Narciso Orellana
MF	10	(Uruguay) Cristian Olivera		(substituted off) 97'
FW	9	(El Salvador) Óscar Cerén
FW	7	(Colombia) Bladimir Diaz		(substituted off) 118'
FW	11	(El Salvador) Juan Carlos Portillo		(substituted off) 69'
Substitutes:
FW	22	(Uruguay) Diego Benitez		(substituted on) 69'
FW	14	(El Salvador) Herbert Sosa		(substituted on) 97'
FW	tbd	(El Salvador) Ezequiel Rivas		(substituted on) 111'
FW	19	(El Salvador) Irvin Herrera		(substituted on) 118'
Manager:
(El Salvador) Jorge Humberto Rodriguez

Aguila
GK	22	(El Salvador) Benji Villalobos
DF	28	(Colombia) Andres Quejada
DF	3	(El Salvador) Ronald Rodriguez
DF	21	(El Salvador) Marlon Trejo
MF	16	(El Salvador) Edwin Lazo	(yellow card) 78'
MF	6	(El Salvador) Walter Chiguila		(yellow card) 98' (substituted off) 111'
MF	5	(El Salvador) Wilson Rugamas
MF	19	(El Salvador) Diego Coca	(substituted off) 103'
MF	12	(El Salvador) Santos Ortíz		(yellow card) 74' (substituted off) 86'
MF	10	(Uruguay) Joaquin Verges	(substituted off) 114'
FW	9	(Uruguay) Waldemar Acosta
Substitutes:
MF	11	(El Salvador) Kevin Reyes		(substituted on) 86'
FW	17	(El Salvador) Jefferson Polio		(substituted on) 103'
MF	4	(El Salvador) Fredy Espinoza		(substituted on) 111'
MF	30	(Ecuador) Ricardo Guevara		(substituted on) 114'
Manager:
(El Salvador) Carlos Romero

Clausura 2019 champions

16th title

== Aggregate table ==
Pos	Team	Pld	W	D	L	GF	GA	GD	Pts	Qualification or relegation
1	Alianza (Q)	44	29	11	4	93	32	+61	98	CONCACAF League preliminary round (Note: As runners-up with better aggregate record (SLV3))
2	Águila (Q)	44	22	12	10	66	38	+28	78	CONCACAF League round of 16 (Note: As Clausura champions (SLV1))
3	Santa Tecla (Q)	44	19	16	9	62	48	+14	73	CONCACAF League preliminary round (Note: As Apertura champions (SLV2))
4	Isidro Metapán	44	17	14	13	56	48	+8	65	
5	FAS	44	16	14	14	44	36	+8	62	
6	Municipal Limeño	44	15	19	10	51	49	+2	59 (Note: Municipal Limeño were deducted 6 points.)	
7	Chalatenango	44	15	12	17	43	52	−9	57	
8	Audaz	44	13	11	20	43	57	−14	50	
9	Pasaquina	44	12	15	17	49	62	−13	45 (Note: Pasaquina were deducted 6 points.)	
10	Jocoro	44	8	19	17	41	54	−13	37 (Note: Jocoro were deducted 6 points.)	
11	Sonsonate	44	7	15	22	42	70	−28	36	
12	Firpo (R)	44	7	10	27	33	77	−44	31	Relegated to Segunda División

Source: Soccerway Soccerway
Rules for classification: 1) points; 2) goal difference; 3) number of goals scored.
(Q) Qualified for the phase indicated; (R) Relegated

== List of foreign players in the league ==
This is a list of foreign players in the 2018–19 season. The following players:

1. Have played at least one game for the respective club.
2. Have not been capped for the El Salvador national football team on any level, independently from the birthplace

A new rule was introduced this season, that clubs can have four foreign players per club and can only add a new player if there is an injury or a player is released and it is before the close of the season transfer window.

Águila
- (Colombia) Jimmy Valoyes
- (Colombia) José Ramírez
- (Uruguay) Waldemar Acosta
- (Uruguay) Joaquín Verges
- (Colombia) Andrés Quejada
- (Ecuador) Richar Mercado

Alianza
- (Uruguay) Darío Ferreira
- (Uruguay) Víctor Rafael García
- (Colombia) Daley Mena
- (Colombia) Bladimir Diaz
- (Uruguay) Diego Benítez
- (Uruguay) Cristian Olivera

Audaz
- (Colombia) Tardelis Peña
- (Jamaica) Mckauly Tulloch
- (Colombia) Gersain Caicedo
- (Colombia) Eduardo Rodriguez

Chalatenango
- (Argentina) Iván Rocca
- (Argentina) Martín Álvarez
- (Argentina) Alan Leonel González
- (Argentina) Alejandro Villani
- (Colombia) Rubén Darío Robledo
- (Colombia) Peter Dominguez
- (Colombia) Cristian Gil Hurtado
- (Honduras) Emerson Alexander Lalin

FAS
- (Argentina) Guillermo Stradella
- (Argentina) Matías Coloca
- (Argentina) Juan Aimar
- (Colombia) Victor Hugo Montaño
- (Chile) Álvaro Fabián López
- (Colombia) Óscar Rodas

Firpo
- (Argentina) Rodrigo de Brito
- (Colombia) Alonso Umaña Popo
- (Trinidad and Tobago) Ricardo John
- (Colombia) Edier Tello
- (Colombia) Juan Guillermo Velez
- (Brazil) André Luiz Vasconcelos

Isidro Metapán
- (Uruguay) Nicolás Fagúndez
- (Brazil) Zé Paulo
- (Brazil) Benvenutti de Souza
- (Brazil) Leonardo Ferreira
- (Jamaica) Mckauly Tulloch
- (Brazil) Ricardinho

Jocoro
- (Honduras) Brayan Zuñiga
- (Nigeria) Fredrick Ogangan
- (Paraguay) Jorge Cáceres
- (Uruguay) Cristhian Maciel
- (Paraguay) José Antonio Ayala
- (Paraguay) Víctor Lugo

Limeño
- (Colombia) Eliécer Espinosa
- (Colombia) Jhony Rios
- (Honduras) Clayvin Zuniga
- (Argentina) Jeremías Ruíz
- (Colombia) James Cabezas
- (Argentina) Rodrigo de Brito

Pasaquina
- (Colombia) Luis Palacios
- (Paraguay) Arnulfo Coleman
- (Colombia) Jeison Quiñones
- (Colombia) Neymer Miranda
- (Colombia) Dilan Esteban Lloreda Castillo
- (Mexico) José Manuel Piñeiro

Sonsonate
- (Mexico) Hilario Tristán
- (Brazil) Alves Dos Santos (Sassá)
- (Brazil) Alan Abdalá
- (Mexico) Ulises Tavares
- (Panama) Armando Polo
- (Panama) Josimar Gomez Piggott
- (Panama) Abdiel Macea
- (Colombia) Daley Mena

Santa Tecla
- (Brazil) Ricardinho
- (Mexico) Joel Almeida
- (Colombia) Yosimar Quiñónez
- (Paraguay) Gustavo Guerreño
- (Argentina) Alejandro Gagliardi
- (Uruguay) Matías Soto
- (Uruguay) Gastón Colman
- (United States) Oscar Sorto

(player released during the Apertura season) (player released between the Apertura and Clausura seasons) (player released during the Clausura season)
