= 2019–20 Primera División de El Salvador =

Primera División de El Salvador
- Season: 2019–20
- Champions: Apertura: Alianza; Clausura: Tournament cancelled
- Relegated: No relegation
- CONCACAF League: Alianza; FAS; Limeño
- Top goalscorer: Nicolas Munoz (19 goals Apertura 2019); Diego Areco (10 goals Clausura 2020)
- Biggest home win: [TBD]
- Biggest away win: Santa Tecla 5–0 Independiente (September 1, 2019)
- Longest winning run: games by: TBD
- Longest unbeaten run: games by: TBD
- Longest winless run: games by: TBD
- Longest losing run: games by: TBD
- All statistics correct as of 29 June 2019.

The 2019–20 Primera División de El Salvador (also known as the Liga Pepsi) is the 21st season and 41st and 42nd Primera División tournament, El Salvador's top football division, since its establishment of an Apertura and Clausura format. Santa Tecla and TBD are the defending champions of both Apertura and Clausura tournaments respectively. The league will consist of 12 teams. There will be two seasons conducted under identical rules, with each team playing a home and away game against the other clubs for a total of 22 games per tournament. At the end of each half-season tournament, the top six teams in that tournament's regular season standings will take part in the playoffs.

The champions of Apertura or Clausura with the better aggregate record will qualify for the 2021 CONCACAF Champions League. The other champion, and the runner-up with the better aggregate record will qualify for the 2020 CONCACAF League. Should the same team win both tournaments, both runners-up will qualify for CONCACAF League. Should the final of both tournaments features the same 2 teams, the semifinalist with the better aggregate record will qualify for CONCACAF League.

== Teams ==
Location of the 2019–20 Primera Division de Fútbol de El Salvador teams

A total of 12 teams will contest the league, including 11 sides from the 2017–18 Primera División and 1 promoted from the 2018–19 Segunda División.

Firpo were relegated to 2019–20 Segunda División the previous season.

The relegated team was replaced by the 2018–19 Segunda División playoffs promotion winner. El Vencedor won the Apertura 2018, while San Pablo won the Clausura 2019 title, El Vencedor won the playoff match 6-5 on penalties after a 0-0 draw.

=== Promotion and relegation ===
Promoted from Segunda División de Fútbol Salvadoreño as of June, 2019.

- Champions: El Vencedor

Relegated to Segunda División de Fútbol Salvadoreño as of June, 2019.

- Last Place: Firpo

=== Personnel and sponsoring ===
Team	Chairman	Head Coach	Captain	Kitmaker	Shirt Sponsors
Águila	(El Salvador) Jose Alexander Menjivar	(Argentina) Daniel Messina	(Colombia) Andres Quejada	Umbro	Mister Donut, Canal 4, Tigo, Pilsener
Alianza	(El Salvador) Adolfo Salume	(Colombia) Wilson Gutierrez	(El Salvador) Marvin Monterroza	Umbro	Canal 4, Mister Donut, Tigo, Gatorade, Pepsi
Independiente	(El Salvador) TBD	(El Salvador) Omar Sevilla	(El Salvador) Carlos Carrillo	PS	Acodjar de R.L. INJIBOA, Laya S.A. De C.V., Electrolit, Perlitas
Chalatenango	(El Salvador) Rigoberto Mejia	(El Salvador) Juan Ramón Sánchez	(El Salvador) Henry Noe Reyes	Nil	Lemus, Premiun Center, Arjona Import & Export Co
Jocoro F.C.	(El Salvador) Leonel Hernández	(Argentina) Juan Andrés Sarulyte	(El Salvador) Giuviny Esquivel	Milan	Haciendo Regalo de Dios, Caja de Credito Jocoro
FAS	(El Salvador) Guillermo Moran	(El Salvador) Guillermo Riviera	(El Salvador) Xavier Garcia	Joma	Pilsener, Tigo, Canal 4, Hospital Cader, Sol
El Vencedor	(El Salvador) Marlon Claros	(El Salvador) Nelson Mauricio Ancheta	(Mexico) Joel Almeida	Innova Sports	TBD
Isidro Metapán	(El Salvador) Rafael Morataya	(El Salvador) Victor Coreas	(El Salvador) Milton Molina	Milan	Canal 4, Arroz de San Pedro, Agroamigo, Morataya
Limeño	(El Salvador) Martín Herrera	(El Salvador) Alvaro Misael Alfaro	(El Salvador) Francisco Jovel Álvarez	Innova Sports	GSR, Chilos Seafood Restaurant, TuriTravel, Disturbidora Torres
Once Deportivo	(El Salvador) José Antonio Salaverría	(Spain) Juan Dieguez	(El Salvador) Christian Sánchez	Rush	Claro, Mister Donut, Pepsi, La Geo, Alcasa
Sonsonate	(El Salvador) Pedro Contreras	(Uruguay) Ruben da Silva	(El Salvador) Jorge Morán	Milan	ProACES, Aldasa, Alcadia Municipal Sonsonate, Canal 4, Leche salud, Ferreteria Santa Sofia, Coop-1
Santa Tecla	(El Salvador) José Eduardo Amaya	(Argentina) Osvaldo Escudero	(El Salvador) Rodrigo Rivera	Maca	Pilsener, Tigo, Plaza Mertio, Pala-grip, Ferreteria Sumersa

== Managerial changes ==
=== Before the start of the season ===
Team	Outgoing manager	Manner of departure	Date of vacancy	Replaced by	Date of appointment	Position in table
Chalatenango	(El Salvador) Alvaro Misael Alfaro	Resigned due to Contract dispute	May 2019	(El Salvador) Juan Ramon Sanchez	July 2019	th (Clausura 2019)
Santa Tecla	(Uruguay) Sebastian Abreu	Interimship Finished	May 2019	(El Salvador) Rodolfo Gochez	May 2019	th (Clausura 2019)
Alianza	(El Salvador) Jorge Humberto Rodriguez	Resigned	June 2019	(Colombia) Wilson Gutierrez	June 2019	th (Clausura 2019)
Jocoro	(El Salvador) Guillermo Rivera	Resigned, went on to become El Salvador under 23 coach	June 2019	(El Salvador) Nelson Ancheta	June 2019	10th (Clausura 2019)
El Vencedor	(El Salvador) Giovanni Trigueros	Contract finished	June 2019	(El Salvador) Victor Coreas	June 2019	Promoted
Independiente	(Uruguay) Pablo Quiñonez	Contract finished	July 2019	(Spain) Juan Cortes Diéguez	July 2019	Bought the spot of Audaz
Once Deportivo	(El Salvador) None	No previous coach, new club	July 2019	(Uruguay) Pablo Quiñonez	July 2019	Bought the spot of Pasaquina

=== During the Apertura season ===
Team	Outgoing manager	Manner of departure	Date of vacancy	Replaced by	Date of appointment	Position in table
Jocoro	(El Salvador) Nelson Ancheta	Sacked	August 2019	(El Salvador) Oscar Eduardo Alvarez (Interim)	August 2019	11th (Apertura 2019)
Santa Tecla	(El Salvador) Rodolfo Gochez	Sacked	August 2019	(El Salvador) Leonel Carcamo (Interim)	August 2019	10th (Apertura 2019)
Jocoro	(El Salvador) Oscar Eduardo Alvarez	Interimship over	September 2019	(El Salvador) Marvin Benitez	September 2019	12th (Apertura 2019)
FAS	(El Salvador) Erick Dowson Prado	Sacked	September 2019	(El Salvador) Guillermo Rivera	September 2019	9th (Apertura 2019)
Santa Tecla	(El Salvador) Leonel Carcamo	interimship finished	September 2019	(Mexico) Marco Sanchez	September 2019	10th (Apertura 2019)
Independiente FC	(Spain) Juan Cortez Diéguez	Sacked	September 2019	(El Salvador) Omar Sevilla	October 2019	11th (Apertura 2019)
Aguila	(El Salvador) Carlos Romero	Sacked	October 2019	(El Salvador) Santos Noel Riviera (Interim)	October 2019	10th (Apertura 2019)
Aguila	(El Salvador) Santos Noel Riviera	Interimship finished	October 2019	(Argentina) Daniel Messina	October 2019	10th (Apertura 2019)
Limeno	(El Salvador) William Renderos Iraheta	Resigned due to personal reason	November 2019	(El Salvador) Manuel Carranza Murrillo (Interim)	November 2019	3rd (Apertura 2019)

=== Between Apertura and Clausura seasons ===
Team	Outgoing manager	Manner of departure	Date of vacancy	Replaced by	Date of appointment	Position in table
Limeno	(El Salvador) Manuel Carranza Murrillo	Interimship finished	December 2019	(El Salvador) Alvaro Misael Alfaro	December 2019	3rd and Quarterfinal (Apertura 2019)
Once Deportivo	(Uruguay) Pablo Quinonez	Contract not renewed	December 2019	(Spain) Juan Cortez	December 2019	12th (Apertura 2019)
Isidro Metapan	(El Salvador) Edwin Portillo	Sacked	December 2019	(El Salvador) Victor Coreas	January 2020	th (Apertura 2019)
Jocoro	(El Salvador) Marvin Benitez	Sacked	December 2019	(Argentina) Juan Andres Sarulyte	January 2020	11th (Apertura 2019)
El Vencedor	(El Salvador) Victor Coreas	Sacked	December 2019	(El Salvador) Nelson Mauricio Ancheta	January 2020	th (Apertura 2019)
Santa Tecla	(Mexico) Marco Sanchez	Sacked	December 2019	(Argentina) Osvaldo Escudero	January 2020	6th (Apertura 2019)

=== During the Clausura season ===
Team	Outgoing manager	Manner of departure	Date of vacancy	Replaced by	Date of appointment	Position in table
Jocoro F.C.	(Argentina) Juan Andres Sarulyte	Resigned due to difference with president	February 2020	(El Salvador) Jose Romero	February 2020	10th (Clausura 2020)
Jocoro F.C.	(El Salvador) Jose Romero	Resigned	March 2020	(El Salvador) Carlos Romero	March 2020	10th (Clausura 2020)
C.D. FAS	(El Salvador) Guillermo Rivera	Sacked	March 2020	(El Salvador) Jorge Humberto Rodriguez	March 2020	6th (Clausura 2020)
Independiente	(El Salvador) Omar Sevilla	Sacked	March 2020	(El Salvador) William Renderos Iraheta	March 2020	4th (Clausura 2020)

== Notable events ==
=== Change to Playoff ===
The league voted to change top qualify to the next round to the top six, with first and second spot qualifying directly to the semi-finals, while teams from 3 to 6 have to playoff

=== Audaz giving their spot ===
On 28 of June, 2019 the only remaining member of the Audaz had taken the license from the previous board, he then gave charge to Independiente F.C.

=== Pasaquina their spot ===
On 3 of July, 2019 Pasaquina failed to meet the requirements that FESFUT had placed for clubs to be allowed to play in the Primera division, the club failed to pay off any outstanding debts. The club will be forced to sell their spot in Primera division.

=== New club registered in the Primera Division ===
On 12 July 2019, a group of investors raised the capital and necessary funds to purchase the spot of Pasaquina. The club will be located the Ahuachapan department and will be called Once Deportivo de Ahuachapan.

=== Clubs moving stadium ===
Several clubs announced that due to their home stadium not meeting new CONCACAF standards, minimal crowd numbers or/and their previous stadium not finishing their renovations in time. Jocoro will be playing at Jose Ramon Flores Berrios which is located at the La Union. FAS will be playing at the Estadio Cuscatlan which is located at San Salvador. El Vencedor will be playing at the Estadio Sergio Torres Rivera which is located at Usulutan. Independiente announced that while their home stadium is going through renovations they would be playing at the Estadio Sergio Torres Rivera which is located at Usulutan.

=== Effects of the 2019–20 coronavirus pandemic ===
Since March, the season has been affected by the 2020 coronavirus pandemic. On 13 March, following an emergency meeting between the Primera division, FESFUt, Segunda and Tecera division, it was unanimously decided to suspend professional football in El Salvador until at least 18 April 2020.

=== Season suspended, new champion and relegation ===
In a historic meeting FESFUT declared to the public that the rest of Clausura 2020 season will be cancelled. Once Deportivo will be crowned champion due to leading the competition prior the suspension of the season, Along with Alianza (Apertura 2019 champion) and FAS (Apertura 2019 runner up) qualified for CONCACAF Competition. Jocoro who were bottom of the aggregate table prior to the suspension of the season will be forced to play promotion/relegation playoff against Platense.

=== Clausura title retracted, no relegation ===
At the FESFUT extraordinary meeting on 29 April 2020, it was decided that the Clausura 2020 season title originally awarded to Once Deportivo would be retracted and the title would not be awarded. However, they would remain the third representative of El Salvador in the 2020 CONCACAF League. Moreover, no promotion and relegation would be applied for this season.

FESFUT decided on 30 May 2020, to name Municipal Limeno, who were third in the aggregate table after Alianza and FAS, the final and third representative of El Salvador in the 2020 CONCACAF League, removing the spot awarded to Once Deportivo.

=== Notable death from Clausura 2019 season and 2020 Apertura season ===
The following people associated with the Primera Division have died between the middle of 2019 and middle of 2020.

- Óscar Enrique Sánchez (Guatemalan, ex Aguila player)
- Walter Martínez (Honduran, ex FAS player)
- Miguel Hermosillo (Chilean, ex Alianza player)
- Edwin Beltrán (ex Dragon player)
- Roger Mayorga (Nicaraguan, ex Aguila player)
- Francisco “Paco” Frances Ortiz (ex FAS, Aguila, Marte and Juventud Olimpica player)
- Victor Emmanuel Rodriguez (ex Chalatenango player)
- Leonardo Salas (Chilean, ex Alianza player)
- Maximiliano Belloso Cubas Catan (ex FAS, Once Municipal and Alianza player)
- Jurandir dos Santos (ex Excelsior, Sonsonate, Alianza Player)

== Apertura ==
=== Results ===
Home \ Away	ÁGU	ALI	IND	CHA	FAS	VEN	MET	JOC	LIM	ONC	STE	SON
Águila		0–0	1–0	2–2	1–2	3–0	1–2	2–0	2–3	2–1	1–0	2–1
Alianza	2–0		0–0	1–0	2–2	4–3	2–1	1–0	4–1	3–0	1–0	3–1
Independiente	0–1	1–1		0–1	1–1	1–2	0–1	2–1	2–2	3–0	0–5	1–1
Chalatenango	1–0	0–2	3–1		1–1	0–0	3–3	2–2	2–3	3–0	3–0	2–4
C.D. FAS	1–2	2–2	3–1	4–0		4–1	1–0	1–2	0–1	2–2	2–1	3–0
El Vencedor	0–0	2–0	0–0	1–1	1–1		2–2	1–2	1–0	0–1	1–1	2–2
Isidro Metapán	2–0	1–2	4–2	2–2	0–2	2–1		1–0	0–2 *	1–2	0–0	1–1
Jocoro	2–2	1–2	0–1	4–1	1–2	0–3	0–1		1–2	1–0	2–1	0–1
Limeño	0–0	1–0	2–3	1–3	1–2	0–1	1–1	2–1		3–0	2–2	3–1
Once Deportivo	0–1	1–3	1–1	0–3	1–1	0–4	1–1	2–2	0–1		2–3	2–3
Santa Tecla	2–1	0–0	1–1	3–0	3–1	1–3	2–2	2–0	0–0	2–1		3–1
Sonsonate	2–0	1–4	1–1	2–1	1–0	3–2	2–0	0–0	3–2	0–4	2–1	

Legend: Blue = home team win; Yellow = draw; Red = away team win.

==== Records ====
- Best home records: Alianza FC (29 points out of 33 points)
- Worst home records: Once Deportivo (4 points out of 33 points)
- Best away records : Alianza FC(19 points out of 33 points)
- Worst away records : Jocoro FC (9 points out of 33 points)
- Most goals scored: Alianza and FAS (38 goals)
- Fewest goals scored: Once Deportivo (21 goals)
- Fewest goals conceded : Alianza F.C. (18 goals)
- Most goals conceded : Once Deportivo (42 goals)

=== Top goalscorers ===
As of 6 May 2019

No.	Player	Club	Goals
1	(El Salvador) (Panama) Nicolas Munoz	El Vencedor	19
2	(Colombia) Bryan Gil	CD. FAS	15
3	(Panama) Armando Polo	Santa Tecla F.C.	15
4	(Honduras) Clayvin Zuniga	CD Municipal Limeño	13
5	(Colombia) Raúl Peñaranda	Alianza F.C.	11
6	(Paraguay) Diego Areco	Jocoro FC	10
7	(Jamaica) Craig Foster	Chalatenango	10
8	(Colombia) Michell Mercado	El Vencedor	7
9	(Colombia) Tardelis Pena	Independiente	7
10	(El Salvador) David Diaz	AD. Isidro Metapan	6

==== Scoring ====
- First goal of the season: (Brazil) Ricardinho for Santa Tecla against Chalatenango, 15 minutes (26 July 2019)
- First goal by a foreign player: (Brazil) Ricardinho for Santa Tecla against Chalatenango, 15 minutes (26 July 2019)
- Fastest goal in a match: 2 minutes
  - (El Salvador) TBD for TBD against TBD (24 February 2019)
- Goal scored at the latest goal in a match: 90+2 minutes
  - (Panama) Armando Polo goal for Santa Tecla against Chalatenango, (July 26, 2019)
- First penalty Kick of the season: (Brazil) Ricardinho for Santa Tecla against Chalatenango, 15 minutes (26 July 2019)
- Widest winning margin: 5 goals
  - Santa Tecla 5–0 Independiente (September 1, 2019)
- First hat-trick of the season: Bryan Gil for FAS against El Vencedor (October 28, 2019)
- First own goal of the season: (El Salvador) Franklin Campos (Once Deportivo) for Limeno (July 29, 2019)
- Most goals in a match: 7 goals
  - Alianza F.C. 4-3 El Vencedor (December 1, 2019)
- Most goals by one team in a match: 5 goals
  - Santa Tecla 5–0 Independiente (September 1, 2019)
- Most goals in one half by one team: 3 goals
  - TBD 3-1 (3-3) TBD (2nd half, January 24, 2019)
- Most goals scored by losing team: 3 goals
  - El Vencedor 3-4 Alianza F.C. (December 1, 2019)
- Most goals by one player in a single match: 4 goals
  - (Colombia) Bryan Gil for FAS against El Vencedor (October 28, 2019)
- Players that scored a hat-trick':
  - (Colombia) Bryan Gil for FAS against El Vencedor (October 28, 2019)
  - (Colombia) Raul Penaranda for Alianza against Limeno (November 4, 2019)
  - (Colombia) Bryan Gil for FAS against Chalatenango (November 21, 2019)

==== Quarterfinals ====
===== First legs =====
6 December 2019
14:30 (UTC-6)

Aguila	1-0	Sonsonate
Gonzalo de Luz 57'		Nil

Estadio Cuscatlan, San Salvador
5 December 2019
12:00 (UTC-6)

Santa Tecla	3-0	Limeno
Kevin Reyes 9'; Gilberto Baires 24'; Armando Polo 55'		Nil

Estadio Las Delicas, Santa Tecla

===== Second legs =====
11 December 2019
20:00 (UTC-6)

Sonsonate	1-0	Aguila
William Maldonado 32'

Estadio Ana Mercedes Campos
Attendance: 3, 533

Sonsonate advances due to being 4th place in the league even though there was a tie of 1-1 aggregate. Will face Alianza in the semifinal.

9 December 2019
15:00 (UTC-6)

Limeno	2-0	Santa Tecla
Clayvin Zuninga 4'; Yuvini Salamanca 75'		Nil

Estadio Jose Berrios Flores, santa rosa de lima

Santa Tecla advances 3-2 on aggregate.

==== Semifinals ====
===== First legs =====
11 December 2019
15:15 (UTC-6)

Sonsonate	0-0	Alianza
Nil		Nil

Estadio Ana Mercedes Campos, Sonsonate
12 December 2019
19:30 (UTC-6)

Santa Tecla	1-1	FAS
Herbert Sosa 33'		Guillermo Stradella 43'

Estadio Las Delicas, Santa Tecla
Referee: Joel Aguilar Chicas

===== Second legs =====
15 December 2019
17:00 (UTC-6)

Alianza	4-1	Sonsonate
Raúl Peñaranda 5' 26'; Oscar Ceren 57'; Isaac Portillo 92'		William Maldonado 13'

Estadio Cuscatlan, San Salvador

Alianza advances 4-1 on aggregate.

15 December 2019
15:00 (UTC-6)

FAS	0-0	Santa Tecla
Nil		Nil

Estadio Oscar Quiteno, Santa Ana

1-1, FAS advances Due to be higher rank.

==== Final ====
December 22, 2019
15:00 UTC−6
Final

Alianza	1-0	FAS
Narciso Orellana 67'		Nil

Estadio Cuscatlán, San Salvador
Attendance: TBD
Referee: German Martinez

Alianza F.C.
GK	1	(Uruguay) Víctor García
DF	12	(El Salvador) Rubén Marroquín
DF	16	(El Salvador) Henry Romero
DF	4	(El Salvador) Ivan Mancía
DF	15	(El Salvador) Jonathan Jiménez
MF	9	(El Salvador) Óscar Cerén
MF	10	(Uruguay) Cristian Olivera
MF	11	(El Salvador) Juan Carlos Portillo	(substituted off) 74' (yellow card) 24'
MF	21	(El Salvador) Marvin Monterrosa	(substituted off) 45'
MF	6	(El Salvador) Narcisco Orellana		66' (substituted off) 84'
ST	7	(Colombia) Raúl Peñaranda
Substitutes:
FW	8	(El Salvador) Oscar Rodriguez		(substituted on) 84'
MF	27	(El Salvador) Issac Portillo		(substituted on) 45'
DF	17	(El Salvador) Alexander Larin		(substituted on) 74'
Manager:
(Colombia) Wilson Gutierrez

'FAS
GK	30	(El Salvador) Nicolas Pacheco
DF	2	(El Salvador) Xavi Garcia
DF	5	(El Salvador) Eder Moscoso
DF	20	(El Salvador) Ibsen Castro
MF	20	(El Salvador) Alberto Henriquez	(yellow card) 70'
MF	31	(El Salvador) Julio Amaya
MF	43	(El Salvador) Bryan Landaverde
MF	21	(Argentina) Guillermo Stradella	(yellow card) 43'
MF	11	(El Salvador) Diego Chavez		(substituted off) 85'
FW	22	(El Salvador) Josue Rivera	(yellow card) 38' (substituted off) 62'
FW	7	(Colombia) Bryan Gil
Substitutes:
MF	10	(El Salvador) Bryan Paz		(substituted on) 85'
FW	14	(Colombia) Jeison Quinonez		(substituted on) 62'
Manager:
(El Salvador) Guillermo Rivera

Apertura 2019 champions

14th title

=== Individual awards ===
Hombre GOL (Top goalscorer)	Hernán Carrasco Vivanco (Best Coach Award)	Fair player Award	Revelation player of the tournament	Best Goalkeeper Award
(Panama) (El Salvador) Nicolas Munoz; El Vencedor	(Colombia) Wilson Gutiérrez; Alianza	(Colombia) Tardelis Peña; Independiente FC	(El Salvador) (Colombia) Bryan Gil; FAS	(Uruguay) Rafael García; Alianza

=== Attendances ===
#	Football club	Average attendance
1	CD FAS	3,194
2	Alianza FC	2,630
3	CD Águila	1,877
4	Municipal Limeño	1,434
5	Independiente FC	1,241
6	AD Chalatenango	1,067
7	El Vencedor	1,007
8	Santa Tecla FC	751
9	Isidro Metapán	479
10	Once Municipal	328
11	Jocoro FC	309

== Clausura ==
=== League table ===
Pos	Team	Pld	W	D	L	GF	GA	GD	Pts
1	Once Deportivo	11	6	2	3	12	7	+5	20
2	El Vencedor	11	5	4	2	13	8	+5	19
3	Alianza	11	4	4	3	15	13	+2	16
4	Independiente	11	3	6	2	8	8	0	15
5	C.D. FAS	11	5	0	6	8	9	−1	15
6	Isidro Metapán	11	4	3	4	5	7	−2	15
7	Limeño	11	3	5	3	15	12	+3	14
8	Águila	11	3	5	3	5	6	−1	14
9	Jocoro	11	3	4	4	20	19	+1	13
10	Santa Tecla	11	2	5	4	11	13	−2	11
11	Sonsonate	11	2	5	4	12	17	−5	11
12	Chalatenango	11	2	5	4	8	13	−5	11

Source: https://www.soccerway.com/el-salvador/primera-division-2019-2020/results/

=== Results ===
Alianza F.C. 1-0 Águila

A.D. Chalatenago 0-0 Independiente National 1906

Home \ Away	ÁGU	ALI	IND	CHA	FAS	VEN	MET	JOC	LIM	ONC	STE	SON
Águila			0–0		1–0	1–1		1–0				1–1
Alianza	1–0		0–1		2–0			1–2				2–2
Independiente						0–0		2–2	1–1	1–0		1–1
Chalatenango	0–0	3–1	0–0		1–0		0–0					
C.D. FAS			2–1			0–1		2–1		0–1	2–0	0–1
El Vencedor		1–2		1–0					1–1		1–1	
Isidro Metapán	1–0	1–3	0–1		0–1	0–2						1–0
Jocoro				4–1		2–3	0–0		2–2	3–2		
Limeño	2–0	2–2		1–1	0–1		0–1				2–1	
Once Deportivo	0–0	0–0		3–0			0–1		2–1		1–0	
Santa Tecla		1–1	2–0	2–1			0–0	2–2				2–2
Sonsonate				1–1		0–2		3–2	0–3	1–2		

Legend: Blue = home team win; Yellow = draw; Red = away team win.

==== Records ====
- Best home records: Once Deportivo (11 points out of 18 points)
- Worst home records: A.D. Isidro Metapan (6 points out of 18 points)
- Best away records : El Vencedor (12 points out of 18 points)
- Worst away records : C.D. Chalatenango (2 points out of 18 points)
- Most goals scored: Jocoro F.C. (20 goals)
- Fewest goals scored: A.D. Isidro Metapan and C.D. Aguila (5 goals)
- Fewest goals conceded : C.D. Aguila (6 goals)
- Most goals conceded : Jocoro F.C. (19 goals)

=== Top goalscorers ===
As of 20 March 2020

No.	Player	Club	Goals
1	(Paraguay) Diego Areco	Jocoro	10
2	(Brazil) Ricardinho	Santa Tecla	5
3	(Colombia) Michell Mercado	El Vencedor	5
4	(El Salvador) Edwin Sanchez	Limeno	5
5	(El Salvador) Harold Alas	Limeno	4
6	(Colombia) Osvaldo Blanco	Alianza	4
7	(Argentina) David Boquin	Sonsonate	4
8	(El Salvador) Jose Enrique Contreras	Once Deportivo	4
9	(Colombia) Daley Mena	Sonsonate	4
10	(Nigeria) Fredrick Ogangan	Independiente FC	4

==== Scoring ====
- First goal of the season: (Paraguay) Diego Areco for Jocoro against Santa Tecla, 61 minutes (19 January 2020)
- First goal by a foreign player: (Paraguay) Diego Areco for Jocoro against Santa Tecla, 61 minutes (19 January 2020)
- Fastest goal in a match: 1 minutes
  - (Paraguay) Diego Areco for Jocoro against Independiente F.C. (6 February 2020)
- Goal scored at the latest point in a match: 90+4 minutes Josue Flores for Isidro Metapan against Aguila (1 March 2020)
- First penalty Kick of the season: (Paraguay) Diego Areco for Jocoro against Santa Tecla, 61 minutes (19 January 2020)
- Widest winning margin: 3 goals
  - Jocoro 4-1 Chalatenango (February 2, 2020)
- First hat-trick of the season: None
- First own goal of the season: (El Salvador) Kevin Martinez (Jocoro) for Once Deportivo (February 23, 2020)
- Most goals in a match: 5 goals
  - Jocoro 4-1 Chalatenango (February 2, 2020)
    Sonsonate 3-2 Jocoro (January 26, 2020)
- Most goals by one team in a match: 4 goals
  - Jocoro 4-1 Chalatenango (February 2, 2020)
- Most goals in one half by one team: 3 goals
  - Jocoro 3-0 (4-1) Chalatenango (2nd half, February 2, 2020)
- Most goals scored by losing team: 2 goals
  - Jocoro 2-3 Sonsonate (26 January 2020)
    Once Deportivo 2–3 Jocoro (23 February 2020)
    Jocoro 2-3 El Vencedor (1 March 2020)
- Most goals by one player in a single match: 2 goals
  - (Colombia) Osvaldo Blanco for Alianza F.C. against C.D. Sonsonate (January 23, 2020)
  - (El Salvador) Edwin Sanchez for C.D. Municipal Limeno against Alianza F.C. (February 6, 2020)
  - (Paraguay) Diego Areco for Jocoro against Independiente F.C. (February 6, 2020)
  - (Colombia) Tardelius Pena for Independiente F.C. against Jocoro (February 6, 2020)
  - (Argentina) David Boquin for C.D. Sonsonate against Santa Tecla (February 6, 2020)
  - (Paraguay) Diego Areco for Jocoro against C.D. Municipal Limeno (February 9, 2020)
  - (Brazil) Ricardinho for Santa Tecla against Chalatenango (February 15, 2020)
  - (El Salvador) Mauricio Cuéllar for FAS against Jocoro (February 16, 2020)
  - (Paraguay) Jose Luis Rodriguez for Jocoro against Once Deportivo (February 23, 2020)
  - (Paraguay) Diego Areco for Jocoro against El Vencedor (1 March 2020)
  - (Colombia) Michel Mercado for El Vencedor against Jocoro (1 March 2020)
  - (El Salvador) Bryan Paz for Once Deportivo against Chalatenango (9 March 2020)
- Players that scored a hat-trick':

None

==== Final ====
The final round of matches and the final were cancelled due to the coronavirus pandemic. The title was subsequently awarded to Once Deportivo, who finished on top of the points table after the eleven rounds that were played.

Clausura 2020 champions

1st title

== List of foreign players in the league ==
This is a list of foreign players in the 2019–20 season. The following players:

1. Have played at least one game for the respective club.
2. Have not been capped for the El Salvador national football team on any level, independently from the birthplace

A new rule was introduced this season, that clubs can have four foreign players per club and can only add a new player if there is an injury or a player is released and it is before the close of the season transfer window.

Águila

- (Paraguay) Javier Lezcano
- (Uruguay) Joaquín Verges
- (Colombia) Andrés Quejada
- (Uruguay) Gonzalo da Luz
- (Argentina) José Vizcarra
- (Uruguay) Waldemar Acosta

Alianza

- (Colombia) Herlbert Enrique Soto
- (Colombia) Raúl Peñaranda
- (Uruguay) Cristian Olivera
- (Puerto Rico) Hector Ramos
- (Uruguay) Maximiliano Freitas
- (Mexico) Felipe Ponce Ramírez
- (Uruguay) José Pablo “Rulo” Varela
- (Colombia) Oswaldo Blanco

Chalatenango

- (Jamaica) Craig Foster
- (Colombia) Eduardo Hurtado
- (Colombia) Luis Arboleda
- (Chile) Luis Cabezas Chavarría
- (Colombia) Elkin Mosquera
- (Colombia) Wilson Palacios
- (Argentina) Maximiliano Martinez
- (Paraguay) Marco Luis González

El Vencedor

- (Colombia) Boris Yasser Polo Mosquera
- (Colombia) Diomer Hinestroza
- (Colombia) Michell Mercado
- (Mexico) Joel Almeida
- (Colombia) Jhon Machado
- (Colombia) Neimer Miranda

FAS

- (Argentina) Guillermo Stradella
- (Colombia) Jeison Quiñones
- (Colombia) Bryan Gil Hurtado
- (Ecuador) Eder Moscoso
- (Colombia) Raúl Peñaranda
- (France) (Argentina) Hugo Bargas
- (Mexico) Diego Castellanos

Independiente

- (Argentina) (Chile) Luciano Sanhuezo
- (Colombia) Camilo Gómez
- (Colombia) Tardelius Pena
- (Colombia) Eduardo Rodriguez
- (Trinidad and Tobago) Jomoul Francois
- (Nigeria) Fredrick Ogangan

Isidro Metapán

- (Brazil) Lucas Dos Santos
- (Colombia) Gersain Caicedo
- (Colombia) Jhonny Rios
- (Trinidad and Tobago) Jomal Williams
- (Colombia) Jeison Murillo
- (Colombia) Arbey Mosquera

Jocoro

- (Argentina) Carlos Del Giorno
- (Colombia) Jackson Palacio
- (Paraguay) Jorge Cáceres
- (Paraguay) Diego Areco
- (Paraguay) Jose Luis Rodriguez
- (Trinidad and Tobago) Jamal Jack
- (Cuba) Luis Paradela

Limeño

- (Colombia) Miguel Murillo
- (Honduras) Clayvin Zuniga
- (Argentina) Rodrigo de Brito
- (Brazil) Zé Paulo
- (Paraguay) Samuel Jiménez
- (Paraguay) Hugo Alexis Oviedo Jara
- (Honduras) Emerson Lalin

Once Deportivo

- (Colombia) Neimer Miranda
- (Colombia) Alonso Umaña
- (Colombia) Marcó Tulio Gallego
- (Colombia) Juan Jose Vasquez
- (Mexico) Marco Granados
- (Colombia) Jeison Quiñones
- (Mexico) Edgar Solis
- (Nicaragua) Luis Fernando Copete

Sonsonate

- (Argentina) David Boquín
- (Uruguay) Jonathan Ramirez
- (Colombia) Beitar Córdoba
- (Colombia) Daley Mena

Santa Tecla

- (Mexico) Joel Almeida
- (Brazil) Ricardinho
- (Panama) Armando Polo
- (Colombia) Brayan Obregon
- (Argentina) Rodrigo de Brito
- (Mexico) Alejandro Dautt
- (Argentina) Juan Aimar

(player released during the Apertura season) (player released between the Apertura and Clausura seasons) (player released during the Clausura season) (player naturalised for the Clausura season)
