= 2020–21 Primera División de El Salvador =

Primera División de El Salvador
- Season: 2020–21
- Champions: Alianza (Apertura); FAS (Clausura)
- Relegated: C.D. Sonsonate
- CONCACAF League: Alianza; FAS; Once Deportivo
- Top goalscorer: Nicolas Munoz (12 goals Apertura 2020); Rodolfo Zelaya (8 goals Clausura 2021)
- Biggest home win: Isidro Metapán 6-0 Once Deportivo (TBD, 2020)
- Biggest away win: C.D. Sonsonate 0–3 Isidro Metapán (TBD, 2021)
- Longest winning run: games by: TBD
- Longest unbeaten run: games by: TBD
- Longest winless run: games by: TBD
- Longest losing run: games by: TBD
- All statistics correct as of 3 April 2020.

The 2020–21 Primera División de El Salvador (also known as the Liga Pepsi) is the 22nd season and 43rd and 44th Primera División tournament, El Salvador's top football division, since its establishment of an Apertura and Clausura format. Alianza F.C. and Once Deportivo de Ahuachapan are the defending champions of both Apertura and Clausura tournaments respectively. The league will consist of 12 teams. There will be two seasons conducted under identical rules, with each team playing a home and away game against the other clubs for a total of 22 games per tournament. At the end of each half-season tournament, the top six teams in that tournament's regular season standings will take part in the playoffs.

The champions of Apertura or Clausura with the better aggregate record will qualify for the 2022 CONCACAF Champions League. The other champion, and the runner-up with the better aggregate record will qualify for the 2020 CONCACAF League. Should the same team win both tournaments, both runners-up will qualify for CONCACAF League. Should the final of both tournaments features the same two teams, the semifinalist with the better aggregate record will qualify for CONCACAF League.

== Teams ==
A total of 12 teams will contest the league, including 10 sides from the 2019–20 Primera División, 1 promoted from the 2019–20 Segunda División and 1 returning from self imposed exile.

No teams were relegated to 2020–21 Segunda División the previous season as that season was cancelled.

=== Further changes ===
- El Vencedor later gave their spot to Atletico Marte.
- Independiente lost their license and their spot was given to Firpo.

=== Personnel and sponsoring ===
Team	Chairman	Head Coach	Captain	Kitmaker	Shirt Sponsors
Águila	(El Salvador) Jose Alexander Menjivar	(Argentina) Hugo Coria	(Colombia) Andres Quejada	Umbro	Mister Donut, Canal 4, Tigo, Pilsener, Boston
Alianza	(El Salvador) Adolfo Salume	(Spain) Juan Dieguez	(El Salvador) Marvin Monterroza	Umbro	Canal 4, Mister Donut, Tigo, Gatorade, Pepsi
Atletico Marte	(El Salvador) TBD	(Argentina) Cristian Domizi	(El Salvador) TBD	Arijam Sports	Sevisal, Canal 4
Chalatenango	(El Salvador) Bertilio Henríquez	(El Salvador) Juan Ramón Sánchez	(El Salvador) Henry Noe Reyes	Aqua Sport	Electrolit, Eurofarma, mnicom, Powerade, Aqu del Campo
Jocoro F.C.	(El Salvador) Leonel Hernández	(El Salvador) Carlos Romero	(El Salvador) Giuviny Esquivel	Milan	Caja de Credito Jocoro, Electruit
FAS	(El Salvador) Guillermo Moran	(El Salvador) Jorge Humberto Rodriguez	(El Salvador) Xavier Garcia	Joma	Pilsener, Tigo, Canal 4, Hospital Cader, Sol
Firpo	(El Salvador) TBD	(El Salvador) William Renderos Iraheta	(Colombia) Tardelis Pena	TBD	TBD
Isidro Metapán	(El Salvador) Rafael Morataya	(El Salvador) Victor Coreas	(El Salvador) Milton Molina	Milan	Canal 4, Arroz de San Pedro, Agroamigo, Morataya
Limeño	(El Salvador) TBD	(El Salvador) Alvaro Misael Alfaro	(El Salvador) Francisco Jovel Álvarez	Innova Sports	GSR, Chilos Seafood Restaurant, TuriTravel, Disturbidora Torres
Once Deportivo	(El Salvador) José Antonio Salaverría	(Mexico) Bruno Martinez	(El Salvador) Christian Sánchez	Rush	Claro, Mister Donut, Pepsi, La Geo, Alcasa
Sonsonate	(El Salvador) Pedro Contreras	(Uruguay) Ruben da Silva	(El Salvador) Jorge Morán	Milan	ProACES, Aldasa, Alcadia Municipal Sonsonate, Canal 4, Leche salud, Ferreteria Santa Sofia, Coop-1
Santa Tecla	(El Salvador) José Eduardo Amaya	(Argentina) Juan Andrés Sarulyte	(El Salvador) Rodrigo Rivera	Maca	Pilsener, Tigo, Plaza Mertio, Pala-grip, Ferreteria Sumersa

== Notable events ==
=== El Vencedor cessation of spot ===
El Vencedor announced that due to ongoing cost and lack of sponsorship, they would be ceding their spot to Atletico Marte.

=== Change of ownership ===
On 3 April, Chalatenango president Rigoberto Mejia announced that Chalatenango had been acquired by a new ownership group

=== Change of license owner ===
At the end of the 2020 season, Pablo Herrera (owner of the franchise license) announced that Independiente will lose their license and he will be giving the license to Luis Angel Firpo for the Clausura 2020.

=== Notable death from Clausura 2020 season and 2021 Apertura season ===
The following people associated with the Primera Division have died between the middle of 2020 and middle of 2021.

- Miguel Herrera (ex Dragon player)
- Hugo Ernesto Burgos Ventura (ex Chalatenango player)
- Rodolfo Alvarado Barrientos (Ex Fuerte San Francisco, Cojutepeque and Chalatenango)
- Hugo Ottenson (Chilean, ex Alianza player)
- Marco Pereira (Brazilian, ex Aguila, Metapan, Chalatenango, Luis Angel Firpo, Once Lobos, FAS and Dragon player)
- Jesus Velázquez Chacon (Ex Platense player)
- Peter Sandoval (Guatemalan, ex Once Lobos player)
- Delvani Quaresma (Brazilian, ex Dragon player)
- Ruben Plaino "La Bruja" (Argentinian, ex Firpo player)
- Mario Tiorra Castro (Ex Sonsonate, Atletico Marte and Aguila)
- Hernan Sosa (Uruguayan, ex Alianza player)
- Juan Masnik (Uruguayan, ex coach of Atlético Marte, FAS, Firpo and Alianza)
- Agustin Balbueno Mencho (Argentinian, Ex FAS player)
- Mario Carlos Rey (Argentinian, Ex Juventud Olimpica and Alianza player and coach of the latter)
- Daniel Mena Luna (current Firpo player)

== Managerial changes ==
=== Before the start of the season ===
Team	Outgoing manager	Manner of departure	Date of vacancy	Replaced by	Date of appointment	Position in table
Aguila	(Argentina) Daniel Messina	Contract finished	April 2020	(Argentina) Hugo Coria	April 2020	th (Apertura 2020)
Atletico Marte	(Chile) Juan Carlos Carreño	Contract finished	May 2020	(Argentina) Cristian Domizi	May 2020	th (Apertura 2020)
Alianza	(Colombia) Wilson Gutierrez	Contract rescinded due to difficulty of travel	July 2020	(Spain) Juan Cortés	August 2020	th (Apertura 2020)
Once Deportivo	(Spain) Juan Cortés	Resigned	July 2020	(Mexico) Bruno Martinez	August 2020	th (Apertura 2020)
Santa Tecla	(Argentina) Osvaldo Escudero	Contract rescinded due to difficulty of travel	August 2020	(Argentina) Juan Andrés Sarulyte	August 2020	th (Apertura 2020)

=== During the Apertura season ===
Team	Outgoing manager	Manner of departure	Date of vacancy	Replaced by	Date of appointment	Position in table
Limeno	(El Salvador) Misael Alfaro	Sacked	October 2020	(El Salvador) Nelson Ancheta	October 2020	
Santa Tecla	(Argentina) Juan Suralyte	Resigned	October 2020	(El Salvador) Jaime Medina (‘’’Interim’’’)	October 2020	Th (Apertura 2020)
Firpo	(El Salvador) William Renderos Iraheta	Resigned	November 2020	(Argentina) Roberto Gamarra	November 2020	Th (Apertura 2020)
Aguila	(Argentina) Hugo Coria	Sacked	November 2020	(Argentina) Ernesto Corti	November 2020	Th (Apertura 2020)
Chalatenango	(El Salvador) Juan Ramón Sánchez	Sacked	December 2020	(Costa Rica) Ricardo Montoya	December 2020	Th (Apertura 2020)
Isidro Metapan	(El Salvador) Victor Coreas	Sacked	December 2020	(El Salvador) Osvadlo Figueroa (Interim)	December 2020	Th (Apertura 2020)
Alianza	(Spain) Juan Cortés	Sacked	December 2020	(El Salvador) Milton Meléndez (Interim)	December 2020	Th (Apertura 2020)

=== Between Apertura and Clausura seasons ===
Team	Outgoing manager	Manner of departure	Date of vacancy	Replaced by	Date of appointment	Position in table
A.D. Isidro Metapan	(El Salvador) Oswaldo Figueroa	Interim finished	January 2021	(Spain) Juan Cortés Dieguez	January 2021	th (Apertura 2021)
C.D. Sonsonate	(Uruguay) Rubén da Silva	Contract finished, not renewed	January 2021	(Uruguay) Fabio Castromán	January 2021	th (Apertura 2021)
Alianza F.C.	(El Salvador) Milton Meléndez	Interimship finished, made it official head coach	January 2021	(El Salvador) Milton Meléndez	January 2021	th (Apertura 2021)
Santa Tecla F.C.	(El Salvador) Jaime Medina	Interimship finished, contract not renewed	January 2021	(Uruguay) Rubén da Silva	January 2021	th (Apertura 2021)
C.D. Aguila	(Argentina) Ernesto Corti	Resigned	February 2021	(Colombia) Armando Osma Rueda	February 2021	th (Apertura 2021)

=== Clausura seasons ===
Team	Outgoing manager	Manner of departure	Date of vacancy	Replaced by	Date of appointment	Position in table
Once Deportivo	(Mexico) Bruno Martinez	Sacked	April 2021	(El Salvador) Mario Elias Guevara	April 2021	th (Clausura 2021)

== Apertura ==
Due to the COVID-19 pandemic, teams will divided into groups of three: Orientale Group, Central Group and Occidentale Group. The first game would start 10 October 2020.

The games will be divided into three different stages:

=== Phase 1 ===
==== Group A ====
Pos	Team	Pld	W	D	L	GF	GA	GD	Pts
1	Isidro Metapán	6	3	1	2	13	9	+4	10
2	FAS	6	3	1	2	9	5	+4	10
3	Once Deportivo	6	3	1	2	8	9	−1	10
4	Sonsonate	6	1	1	4	4	11	−7	4

Rules for classification: 1) points; 2) goal difference; 3) number of goals scored.

==== Group B ====
Pos	Team	Pld	W	D	L	GF	GA	GD	Pts
1	Alianza	6	5	1	0	14	3	+11	16
2	Chalatenango	6	1	3	2	8	10	−2	6
3	Santa Tecla	6	1	3	2	6	10	−4	6
4	Atletico Marte	6	1	1	4	7	12	−5	4

Rules for classification: 1) points; 2) goal difference; 3) number of goals scored.

==== Group C ====
Pos	Team	Pld	W	D	L	GF	GA	GD	Pts
1	Jocoro	6	4	0	2	9	8	+1	12
2	Firpo	6	3	1	2	5	4	+1	10
3	Municipal Limeño	6	2	1	3	7	8	−1	7
4	Águila	6	2	0	4	7	8	−1	6

Rules for classification: 1) points; 2) goal difference; 3) number of goals scored.

=== Phase 2 ===
==== Group A ====
Pos	Team	Pld	W	D	L	GF	GA	GD	Pts	Qualification or relegation
1	Águila (Q)	10	6	4	0	15	6	+9	22	Advance to Playoffs
2	Alianza (Q)	10	6	1	3	18	12	+6	19	Advance to Playoffs
3	Jocoro	10	2	5	3	10	12	−2	11	Advance to Playoffs
4	Sonsonate	10	1	7	2	12	13	−1	10	Advance to Playoffs
5	Atletico Marte	10	1	5	4	15	21	−6	8	
6	Isidro Metapán	10	1	4	5	10	16	−6	7	

Updated to match(es) played on 4 January 2021. Source:
Rules for classification: 1) points; 2) goal difference; 3) number of goals scored.
(Q) Qualified for the phase indicated

==== Group B ====
Pos	Team	Pld	W	D	L	GF	GA	GD	Pts	Qualification or relegation
1	FAS (Q)	10	6	2	2	15	10	+5	20	Advance to Playoffs
2	Municipal Limeño (Q)	10	5	2	3	15	11	+4	17	Advance to Playoffs
3	Once Deportivo (Q)	10	5	2	3	12	8	+4	17	Advance to Playoffs
4	Firpo (Q)	10	3	3	4	8	11	−3	12	Advance to Playoffs
5	Santa Tecla	10	2	3	5	9	14	−5	9	
6	Chalatenango	10	1	4	5	9	14	−5	7	

Updated to match(es) played on 4 January 2021. Source:
Rules for classification: 1) points; 2) goal difference; 3) number of goals scored.
(Q) Qualified for the phase indicated

==== Aggregate Table ====
Pos	Team	Pld	W	D	L	GF	GA	GD	Pts
1	Alianza	16	11	2	3	32	15	+17	35
2	Jocoro	16	6	5	5	19	20	−1	23
3	Isidro Metapán	16	4	5	7	23	25	−2	17
4	FAS	16	9	3	4	24	15	+9	30
5	Firpo	16	6	4	6	13	15	−2	22
6	Chalatenango	16	2	7	7	17	24	−7	13
7	Once Deportivo	16	8	3	5	20	17	+3	27
8	Municipal Limeño	16	7	3	6	22	19	+3	24
9	Santa Tecla	16	3	6	7	15	24	−9	15
10	Águila	16	8	4	4	22	14	+8	28
11	Sonsonate	16	2	8	6	16	24	−8	14
12	Atletico Marte	16	2	6	8	22	33	−11	12

Updated to match(es) played on 4 January 2021. Source:
Rules for classification: 1) points; 2) goal difference; 3) number of goals scored.

=== Phase 3 ===
==== Quarterfinals ====
===== First legs =====
14 January 2021
14:30 (UTC-6)

Firpo	0-2	Aguila
Nil		Nicolas Munoz 61'; Yan Maciel 90'

14 January 2021
12:00 (UTC-6)

Once Deportivo de Ahuachapan	1-2	Alianza
Henry Romero 12'; Rodolfo Zelaya 30'		Tony Rugamas 7'

15 January 2021
12:00 (UTC-6)

Jocoro	0-0	Limeno
Nil		Nil

15 January 2021
12:00 (UTC-6)

Sonsonate	0-1	FAS
Nil		Diego Areco 5'

Estadio

===== Second legs =====
17 January 2021
20:00 (UTC-6)

Aguila	1-0	Firpo
Yan Maciel 42'		Nil

Estadio

Aguila won 3-0 on aggregate

18 January 2021
20:00 (UTC-6)

Alianza	3-1	Once Deportivo
Bryan Tamacas 39' 58'; Rodolfo Zelaya 82'		Elvin Alvarado 18'

Estadio

Alianza won 5-2 on Aggregate

18 January 2021
15:00 (UTC-6)

Limeno	1-2	Jocoro
Hugo Oviedo 26'		Ovidio Lanza 34'; Oscar Rodriguez 49'

Estadio

Jocoro won 2-1 aggregate

9 December 2019
15:00 (UTC-6)

FAS	2-2	Sonsonate
Diego Areco 9' 45'		Alexis Montes 13'; David Boquin 48'

Estadio

FAS won 3-2 on aggregate

==== Semifinals ====
===== First legs =====
21 January 2021
15:15 (UTC-6)

Alianza	3-0	FAS
Bryan Tamacas 5' 26'; Narciso Orellana 41' 59'		Nil

Estadio Cuscatlan, San Salvador
22 January 2021
19:30 (UTC-6)

Jocoro	1-0	Aguila
Nicolas Munoz own goal 41'		Nil

Estadio

===== Second legs =====
25 January 2021
17:00 (UTC-6)

FAS	0-0	Alianza
Nil		Nil

Estadio Oscar Quiteno, Santa Ana

Alianza advances 3-0 on aggregate.

25 January 2021
15:00 (UTC-6)

Aguila	2-0	Jocoro
Andres Quejada 42'; Marlon Silva 74'		Nil

Aguila advances 2-1 on aggregate.

==== Final ====
January 31, 2021
15:00 UTC−6
Final

Alianza	3-0	Aguila
Jonathan Jiménez 41'; Rodolfo Zelaya 79'; Dixon Rivas own goal 84'		Nil

Estadio Cuscatlán, San Salvador
Attendance: TBD
Referee: Ivan Barton

Alianza F.C.
GK	25	(El Salvador) Mario Gonzalez
DF	4	(El Salvador) Ivan Mancía
DF	16	(El Salvador) Henry Romero
DF	15	(El Salvador) Jonathan Jiménez	41'
DF	12	(El Salvador) Rubén Marroquín
DF	20	(El Salvador) Bryan Tamacas	(substituted off) 24'
MF	6	(El Salvador) Narcisco Orellana
MF	27	(El Salvador) Isaac Portillo
MF	21	(El Salvador) Marvin Monterrosa	(substituted off) 85'
FW	11	(El Salvador) Juan Carlos Portillo	(substituted off) 85' (yellow card) 24'
ST	23	(Colombia) Michell Mercado	(substituted off) 67'
Substitutes:
DF	19	(El Salvador) César Noé Flores		(substituted on) 24'
ST	22	(El Salvador) Rodolfo Zelaya		(substituted on) 67' (goal) 68'
DF	10	(Mexico) Felipe Ponce Ramírez		(substituted on) 88'
DF	17	(El Salvador) Wilfredo Cienfuegos		(substituted on) 88'
Manager:
(El Salvador) Milton Melendez

Aguila
GK	22	(El Salvador) Benji Villalobos
DF	3	(El Salvador) Ronald Rodríguez
DF	28	(Colombia) Andrés Quejada
DF	21	(El Salvador) Marlon Trejo	(substituted off) 40'
DF	16	(El Salvador) Kevin Melara
MF	15	(El Salvador) Fabricio Alfaro	(substituted off) 74'
MF	12	(El Salvador) Santos Ortiz
MF	19	(El Salvador) Diego Galdámez Coca	(substituted off) 74'
MF	10	(El Salvador) Gerson Mayen
FW	17	(Brazil) Yan Maciel	(substituted off) 63'
FW	23	(Panama) Nicolas Munoz
Substitutes:
MF	4	(El Salvador) Fredy Espinoza		(substituted on) 40'
FW	9	(Brazil) Marlon da Silva		(substituted on) 63'
MF	6	(El Salvador) Dixon Rivas		(substituted on) 74' own goal 84'
MF	'11	(El Salvador) Victor Garcia		(substituted on) 74'
Manager:
(Argentina) Ernesto Corti

Apertura 2020 champions

15th title

=== Individual awards ===
Hombre GOL (Top goalscorer)	Hernán Carrasco Vivanco (Best Coach Award)	Fair player Award	Revelation player of the tournament	Best Goalkeeper Award
(Panama) (El Salvador) Nicolas Munoz; Aguila	(El Salvador) Jorge Humberto Rodriguez; FAS	(Trinidad and Tobago) Jomal Williams; Isidro Metapan	(El Salvador) Diego Chévez; Atletico Marte	(El Salvador) Yonathan Guardado; Once Deportivo

==== Records ====
- Best home records: TBD (0 points out of 33 points)
- Worst home records: TBD (0 points out of 33 points)
- Best away records : TBD (0 points out of 33 points)
- Worst away records : TBD (0 points out of 33 points)
- Most goals scored: Alianza F.C. (32 goals)
- Fewest goals scored: C.D. Luis Angel Firpo (13 goals)
- Fewest goals conceded : C.D. Aguila (14 goals)
- Most goals conceded : Atletico Marte (33 goals)

No.	Player	Club	Goals
1	(El Salvador) (Panama) Nicolas Munoz	C.D. Aguila	12
2	(Honduras) Ovido Lanza	Jocoro F.C.	9
3	(Paraguay) Hugo Oviedo	Municipal Limeno	8
4	(El Salvador) David Rugamas	Once Deportivo	7
5	(El Salvador) Juan Carlos Portillo	Alianza FC	6
6	(Trinidad and Tobago) Jomal Williams	A.D. Isidro Metapan	6
7	(Colombia) Oswaldo Blanco	Alianza F.C.	5
8	(El Salvador) (Argentina) Guillermo Stradella	C.D. FAS	5
9	(Colombia) Eduardo Rodriguez	Atletico Marte	5
10	(Argentina) David Boquin	C.D. Sonsonate	4

==== Scoring ====
- First goal of the season: (El Salvador) Roberto Hernandez for Jocoro against Firpo, 78 minutes (10 October 2020)
- First goal by a foreign player: (Panama) Nicolas Munoz for Aguila against Limeno, 18 minutes (10 October 2020)
- Fastest goal in a match: 15 Seconds
  - (El Salvador) Ramon Rodriguez for Limeno against FAS (13 December 2020)
- Goal scored at the latest goal in a match: 90+2 minutes
  - (El Salvador) Roberto Hernandez goal for Jocoro against Firpo, (October 10, 2020)
- First penalty Kick of the season: (Panama) Nicolas Munoz for Aguila against Limeno, 18 minutes (10 October 2020)
- Widest winning margin: 6 goals
  - Isidro Metapan 6-0 Once Deportivo (October 18, 2020)
- First hat-trick of the season: Elvin Alvarado for Once Deportivo against Sonsonate (October 11, 2020)
- First own goal of the season: (El Salvador) Alexander Mendoza (Santa Tecla F.C.) for Alianza F.C. (October 11, 2020)
- Most goals in a match: 8 goals
  - Atletico Marte 3-5 Alianza F.C. (November 23, 2020)
- Most goals by one team in a match: 6 goals
  - Isidro Metapan 6-0 Once Deportivo (October 18, 2020)
- Most goals in one half by one team: 3 goals
  - C.D. Sonsonate 2-3 (2-3) Isidro Metapan (2nd half, December 20, 2020)
- Most goals scored by losing team: 3 goals
  - Atletico Marte 3-5 Alianza F.C. (November 23, 2020)
- Most goals by one player in a single match: 3 goals
  - (El Salvador) Elvin Alvarado for Once Deportivo against Sonsonate (October 11, 2020)
- Players that scored a hat-trick':
  - (El Salvador) Elvin Alvarado for Once Deportivo against Sonsonate (October 11, 2020)

== Clausura ==
=== Results ===
Home \ Away	ÁGU	ALI	FIR	CHA	FAS	ATM	MET	JOC	LIM	ONC	STE	SON
Águila												
Alianza												
C.D. Luis Angel Firpo												
Chalatenango												
C.D. FAS												
Atletico Marte												
Isidro Metapán												
Jocoro												
Limeño												
Once Deportivo												
Santa Tecla												
Sonsonate												

Legend: Blue = home team win; Yellow = draw; Red = away team win.

=== Phase 3 (Playoffs) ===
==== Quarterfinals ====
===== First legs =====
5 May 2021
14:30 (UTC-6)

Firpo	1-0	Isidro Metapan
Jefferson Polio 74'		Nil

Estadio Sergio Torres Rivera
5 May 2021
15:00 (UTC-6)

Aguila	0-1	Alianza
Nil		Michel Mercado 86'

Estadio Juan Francisco Barraza
5 May 2021
15:30 (UTC-6)

FAS	2-1	Limeno
Wilma Torres 46'; Dustin Corea 89'		Romulo Villalobos 5'

Estadio Oscar Alberto Quiteno
5 May 2021
19:00 (UTC-6)

Santa Tecla	1-1	Once Deportivo
Roberto Gonzalez 71'		David Rugamas 74'

Estadio Las Delicias

===== Second legs =====
8 May 2021
15:00 (UTC-6)

Isidro Metapan	1-3	Firpo
Marvin Marquez 43'		Eduardo Vigil 47'; Eder Caicedo 70'; Jefferson Polio 85'

Estadio Jorge Calero Suazo

Firpo won 4-1 on aggregate

9 May 2021
15:00 (UTC-6)

Once Deportivo de Ahuachapan	1-2	Santa Tecla F.C.
David Rugamas 80'		Roberto González 68' Irvin Herrera 70'

Estadio

Santa Tecla won 3-2 on aggregate

9 May 2021
15:00 (UTC-6)

Alianza F.C.	2-1	C.D. Aguila
Rodolfo Zelaya 81' 86'		Nicolas Munoz 18'

Estadio

Alianza won 3-2 on aggregate

9 May 2021
15:00 (UTC-6)

Limeno	2-1	FAS
Rómulo Villalobos 83' Víctor Torres 85'		Wilma Torres 57'

Estadio

2-2. FAS won 3-2 on penalties

==== Semifinals ====
===== First legs =====
15 May 2021
19:30 (UTC-6)

Santa Tecla F.C.	0-1	FAS
Nil		Dustin Corea 89'

Estadio Las Delicias
Referee: Ismael Cornejo
17 May 2021
15:00 (UTC-6)

C.D. Luis Angel Firpo	1-2	Alianza F.C.
Jefferson Polio 70'		Juan Portillo 43'; Rodolfo Zelaya 98'

Estadio Sergio Torres Rivera
Referee: Ivan Arcides Barton

===== Second legs =====
22 May 2021
19:15 (UTC-6)

Alianza F.C.	0-1	C.D. Luis Angel Firpo
Nil		Luis Canales 74'

Estadio Cuscatlan
Referee: Germany Stanley Martinez

2-2. Alianza advances 5-4 on penalties.

23 May 2021
15:00 (UTC-6)

FAS	0-1	Santa Tecla F.C.
Nil		Diego Areco 74'

Estadio Quiteno, Santa Ana
Referee: Jaime Alfredo Herrera

1-1. FAS advances 4-2 on penalties.

==== Final ====
January 31, 2021
15:00 UTC−6
Final

Alianza	1-1	FAS
Andres Flores Jaco own goal 56'		Kevin Reyes 39'
Penalties
	3-4

Estadio Cuscatlán, San Salvador
Attendance: TBD
Referee: Edgar Ramirez

Alianza F.C.
GK	25	(El Salvador) Mario Gonzalez
DF	4	(El Salvador) Ivan Mancía	(yellow card) 30'
DF	16	(El Salvador) Henry Romero
DF	15	(El Salvador) Jonathan Jiménez
DF	28	(El Salvador) Rudy Clavel
DF	20	(El Salvador) Bryan Tamacas	(substituted off) 105'
MF	6	(El Salvador) Narcisco Orellana
MF	27	(El Salvador) Isaac Portillo	(substituted off) 46'
MF	21	(El Salvador) Marvin Monterrosa	(substituted off) 118'
FW	11	(El Salvador) Juan Carlos Portillo	(substituted off) 85'
ST	23	(Colombia) Michell Mercado
Substitutes:
DF	19	(El Salvador) Elvin Alvarado		(substituted on) 85'
ST	22	(El Salvador) Rodolfo Zelaya		(substituted on) 46'
DF	10	(El Salvador) Oscar Ceren		(substituted on) 105'
DF	17	(El Salvador) Oscar Rodriguez		(substituted on) 118'
Manager:
(El Salvador) Milton Melendez

FAS
GK	1	(El Salvador) Kevin Carabantes
DF	20	(El Salvador) Ibsen Castro	(yellow card) 98'
DF	23	(Panama) Roberto Chen
DF	24	(El Salvador) Mauricio Cuellar
DF	6	(El Salvador) Andrés Flores	own goal 56'	(yellow card) 34'
MF	6	(El Salvador) Ervian Flores	(substituted off) 99'
MF	11	(El Salvador) Tomas Granitto	(substituted off) 60'
MF	27	(Mexico) Carlos Peña	(substituted off) 65'
MF	21	(El Salvador) Wilma Torres	(substituted off) 60'
MF	7	(El Salvador) Kevin Reyes	(yellow card) 85'	39'
FW	9	(Colombia) Luis Peralta	(substituted off) 99'
Substitutes:
MF	4	(Argentina) Guillermo Stradella		(substituted on) 60'
FW	9	(El Salvador) Brayan Landeverde		(substituted on) 60'
MF	6	(El Salvador) Dustin Corea		(substituted on) 65'
MF	'11	(El Salvador) Julio Amaya		(substituted on) 99'
MF	'11	(Colombia) Luis Perea		(substituted on) 99'
Manager:
(El Salvador) Jorge Humberto Rodriguez

Clausura 2021 champions

18th title

==== Records ====
- Best home records: TBD (0 points out of 33 points)
- Worst home records: TBD (0 points out of 33 points)
- Best away records : TBD (0 points out of 33 points)
- Worst away records : TBD (0 points out of 33 points)
- Most goals scored: Alianza F.C. (38 goals)
- Fewest goals scored: Jocoro F.C. (9 goals)
- Fewest goals conceded : C.D. Aguila (10 goals)
- Most goals conceded : Atletico Marte (34 goals)

No.	Player	Club	Goals
1	(El Salvador) Rodolfo Zelaya	Alianza	8
2	(Jamaica) Kemal Malcolm	Chalatenango	7
3	(Colombia) Edgar Medrano	Once Deportivo	7
4	(El Salvador) Irvin Herrera	Santa Tecla F.C.	6
5	(Argentina) Jorge Cordoba	Alianza FC	6
6	(El Salvador) Wilma Torres	FAS	6
7	(Jamaica) Craig Foster	Chalatenango	6
8	(Colombia) Michel Mercano	Alianza	5
9	(El Salvador) David Rugamas	Once Deportivo	5
10	(El Salvador) (Panama) Nicolas Munoz	Aguila	5

==== Scoring ====
- First goal of the season: (El Salvador) Ronald Rodriguez for Aguila against Limeno, 24 minutes (14 February 2021)
- First goal by a foreign player: (Honduras) Ovidio Lanza for Jocoro against Firpo, 46 minutes (14 February 2021)
- Fastest goal in a match: 2 Minutes
  - (Colombia) Jhon Machado for Isidro Metapan against FAS (February 14, 2021)
- Goal scored at the latest goal in a match: 90 minutes
  - (El Salvador) Diego Sanchez goal for Santa Tecla against Atletico Marte, (February 18, 2021)
- First penalty Kick of the season: (El Salvador) Esquiel Rivas for Chalatenango against Atletico Marte, 27 minutes (14 February 2021)
- Widest winning margin: 5 goals
  - Firpo 5-0 Atletico Marte (April __, 2021)
- First hat-trick of the season: (Jamaica) Kemal Orlando Malcolm for Chalatenango against Santa Tecla F.C. (April, 2021)
- First own goal of the season: (El Salvador) Alexander Mendoza (Santa Tecla F.C.) for Atletico Marte, (February 18, 2021)
- Most goals in a match: 8 goals
  - Atletico Marte 3-5 Alianza F.C. (November 23, 2020)
- Most goals by one team in a match: 5 goals
  - Firpo 5-0 Atletico Marte (April __, 2021)
- Most goals in one half by one team: 3 goals
  - C.D. Sonsonate 2-3 (2-3) Isidro Metapan (2nd half, December 20, 2020)
- Most goals scored by losing team: 3 goals
  - Atletico Marte 3-5 Alianza F.C. (November 23, 2020)
- Most goals by one player in a single match: 3 goals
  - (Jamaica) Kemal Orlando Malcolm for Chalatenango against Santa Tecla F.C. (April, 2021)
- Players that scored a hat-trick':
  - (Jamaica) Kemal Orlando Malcolm for Chalatenango against Santa Tecla F.C. (April, 2021)

== List of foreign players in the league ==
This is a list of foreign players in the 2020–21 season. The following players:

1. Have played at least one game for the respective club.
2. Have not been capped for the El Salvador national football team on any level, independently from the birthplace

A new rule was introduced this season, that clubs can have four foreign players per club and can only add a new player if there is an injury or a player is released and it is before the close of the season transfer window.

Águila

- (Brazil) Bruno Kairon
- (Brazil) Yan Maciel
- (Brazil) Marlon Da Silva de Moura
- (Colombia) Andrés Quejada

Alianza

- (Uruguay) Maximiliano Freitas
- (Mexico) Felipe Ponce Ramírez
- (Colombia) Oswaldo Blanco
- (Colombia) Mitchel Mercado
- (Argentina) Jorge Córdoba

Atletico Marte

- (Guatemala) Luis Tatuaca
- (Colombia) Argenis Alba (*)
- (Mexico) Daniel Guzman
- (Colombia) Eduardo Rodriguez
- (Colombia) Jhony Moran Chan (*)
- (Colombia) Sebastian Viafara (*)
- (Colombia) Yoan Ballesteros (*)

Chalatenango

- (Costa Rica) Sergio Cordoba
- (Cuba) Luis Paradela
- (Honduras) Emerson Lalin
- (Mexico) Carlos Felix
- (Mexico) Jesus Everardo Rubio
- (Jamaica) Craig Foster
- (Jamaica) Chevone Marsh
- (Jamaica) Kemal Orlando Malcolm

FAS

- (Colombia) Luis Perea
- (Colombia) Raúl Peñaranda
- (Paraguay) Diego Areco
- (Paraguay) Jose Luis Rodriguez
- (Mexico) Gullit Peña(*)
- (Colombia) Luis Peralta
- (Panama) Roberto Chen

Firpo

- (Colombia) Tardelius Pena
- (Nigeria) Fredrick Ogangan
- (Panama) Armando Polo
- (Panama) Nelson Barahona
- (Ecuador) Eber Caicedo

Isidro Metapán

- (Argentina) Guillermo Vernetti (*)
- (Brazil) Ricardinho
- (Colombia) Jhon Machado
- (Colombia) Yeison Murillo
- (Trinidad and Tobago) Jomal Williams
- (Argentina) Leonardo Incoruala (*)

Jocoro

- (Ecuador) Eder Moscoso
- (Honduras) Junior Jesus Padilla
- (Honduras) Arnold Josue Melendez
- (Honduras) Ovidio Lanza
- (Colombia) Beitar Córdoba
- (Colombia) William Guerrero

Limeño

- (Colombia) Beitar Córdoba
- (Colombia) Jeison Quiñonez
- (Paraguay) Samuel Jiménez
- (Paraguay) Hugo Alexis Oviedo Jara
- (Colombia) Robinson Aponzá
- (Colombia) Eisner Loboa
- (Colombia) Yosimar Quinones

Once Deportivo

- (Nicaragua) Luis Fernando Copete
- (Colombia) Daley Mena
- (Panama) Abdiel Macea
- (Colombia) Edgar Medrano
- (Mexico) Édgar Solís
- (Mexico) Dieter Vargas
- (Mexico) Marvin Piñón

Sonsonate

- (Argentina) David Boquín
- (Colombia) Daniel Buitrago
- (Colombia) Jose Mondragon
- (Colombia) Víctor Landazuri (*)
- (Uruguay) Andres Martin Lima (*)

Santa Tecla

- (Mexico) Alejandro Dautt
- (Colombia) Yosimar Quinones
- (Uruguay) Cristian Olivera (*)
- (Colombia) Eduardo Rodriguez (*)
- (Paraguay) Diego Areco

(player released during the Apertura season) (player released between the Apertura and Clausura seasons) (player released during the Clausura season) (player naturalised for the Clausura season)
