= Jeison =

Jeison is a given name. Notable people with the name include:

- Jeison Angulo (born 1996), Colombian professional footballer
- Jeison Guzmán (born 1998), Dominican professional baseball shortstop
- Jeison Lucumí (born 1995), Colombian professional footballer
- Jeison Medina (born 1995), Colombian footballer
- Jeison Murillo (born 1992), Colombian professional footballer
- Jeison Quiñones (born 1986), Colombian professional footballer
- Jeison Rosario (born 1995), Dominican professional boxer
- Jeison Suárez (born 1991), long-distance runner from Colombia
