= Andrés Flores Jaco =

Salvadoran footballer (born 1995)

Personal information
- Full name: Andrés Alberto Flores Jaco
- Date of birth: January 20, 1995 (age 31)
- Place of birth: Santa Ana, El Salvador
- Height: 1.67 m (5 ft 6 in)
- Position: Defender

Team information
- Current team: FAS
- Number: 16

Youth career
- 2010–2011: Isidro Metapán (youth)

Senior career*
Years	Team	Apps	(Gls)
2011–2013	Isidro Metapán	23	(0)
2013–2014	Luis Ángel Firpo	26	(0)
2014–2018	Alianza	122	(1)
2018–2020	Santa Tecla		
2020–	FAS	88	(0)

International career
2015	El Salvador U20		
2013–	El Salvador	5	(0)
- * Club domestic league appearances and goals as of 20 May 2023

Andrés Alberto Flores Jaco (born January 20, 1995) is a Salvadoran professional footballer who plays as a defender for Primera División club FAS and the El Salvador national team.

== Alianza F.C. ==
His contract was renewed for two more years in 2016 and is sufficient until 2018.

Starting for Alianza in a fixture against Atlético Marte, Flores was injured after a sliding tackle. He underwent tests in order to verify the severity of the injury which was inflicted on his left leg.

== Personal life ==
Flores Jaco attends the Universidad Salvadoreña Alberto Masferrer.

== Honours ==
FAS

- Salvadoran Primera División: Clausura 2021
