= Raúl Peñaranda (footballer) =

Colombian footballer (born 1991)

Personal information
- Full name: Raúl Eduardo Peñaranda Contreras
- Date of birth: 2 May 1991 (age 35)
- Place of birth: Santa Marta, Colombia
- Height: 1.77 m (5 ft 10 in)
- Position: Striker

Team information
- Current team: FAS
- Number: 7

Youth career
- Atlético Junior
- 2010–2011: Barranquilla

Senior career*
Years	Team	Apps	(Gls)
2011–2013	Barranquilla	23	(5)
2014	Valledupar	17	(13)
2014–2015	Once Caldas	8	(2)
2015	Jaguares	3	(0)
2016	Unión Magdalena	5	(0)
2016	Valledupar	10	(0)
2017	Petroleros Anzoátegui		
2018	Deportivo Anzoátegui	8	(0)
2018	Árabe Unido	13	(6)
2019–2020	Alianza	20	(13)
2020–	FAS	26	(4)
- * Club domestic league appearances and goals as of 9 February 2021

Raúl Eduardo Peñaranda Contreras (born 2 May 1991) is a Colombian professional footballer who plays as a striker for Salvadoran club FAS. Besides Colombia, he has played in El Salvador.

== Early life ==
Peñaranda was born in the city of Santa Marta in Colombia's Magdalena Department.

== Career ==
=== Alianza ===
In July 2019, Peñaranda signed with Salvadoran Primera División side Alianza. He made his debut on 28 July 2020 in a 2–2 draw against FAS, receiving a red card in the 90th minute. That year, Peñaranda finished fifth in scoring over the course of the Apertura season, scoring eleven goals in seventeen appearances, and added another two goals in three playoff appearances as Alianza won the opening season. Peñaranda also stood out in CONCACAF League play, appearing in all eight of Alianza's matches and scoring four goals in a run to the semi-finals, where they were eliminated by Honduran side Motagua.

=== FAS ===
On 8 January 2020, Peñaranda signed with FAS. He made his debut on 19 January in a 1–0 win over Municipal Limeño.

== Career statistics ==
As of 22 November 2020

Appearances and goals by club, season and competition
Club	Season	League			National cup (Note: Includes Copa Colombia and Copa Venezuela)		Continental (Note: Includes CONCACAF League)		Other (Note: Includes Categoría Primera A playoffs and Salvadoran Primera División playoffs)		Total	
Club	Season	Division	Apps	Goals	Apps	Goals	Apps	Goals	Apps	Goals	Apps	Goals
Barranquilla	2011	Categoría Primera B	0	0	1	0	—		0	0	1	0
Barranquilla	2012	Categoría Primera B	7	1	8	1	—		0	0	15	2
Barranquilla	2013	Categoría Primera B	16	4	6	2	—		0	0	22	6
Barranquilla	Total		23	5	15	3	0	0	0	0	38	8
Valledupar	2014	Categoría Primera B	17	13	0	0	—		0	0	17	13
Once Caldas	2014	Categoría Primera A	2	0	6	1	—		1	0	9	1
Once Caldas	2015	Categoría Primera A	6	2	0	0	—		0	0	6	2
Once Caldas	Total		8	2	6	1	0	0	1	0	15	3
Jaguares	2015	Categoría Primera A	3	0	0	0	—		0	0	3	0
Unión Magdalena	2016	Categoría Primera B	5	0	5	1	—		0	0	10	1
Valledupar	2016	Categoría Primera B	10	0	2	0	—		0	0	12	0
Deportivo Anzoátegui	2018	Venezuelan Primera División	8	0	?	2	—		0	0	8	2
Árabe Unido	2018–19	Liga Panameña	13	6	—		4	0	0	0	17	6
Alianza	2019–20	Salvadoran Primera División	17	11	—		8	4	3	2	28	17
FAS	2019–20	Salvadoran Primera División	11	1	—		—		0	0	11	1
FAS	2020–21	Salvadoran Primera División	7	1	—		1	0	0	0	8	1
FAS	Total		18	2	0	0	1	0	0	0	19	2
Career total			122	39	28	7	13	4	4	2	167	52

== Honours ==
FAS

- Salvadoran Primera División: Clausura 2021
