= CD Audaz =

Association football club in El Salvador

C.D. Audaz
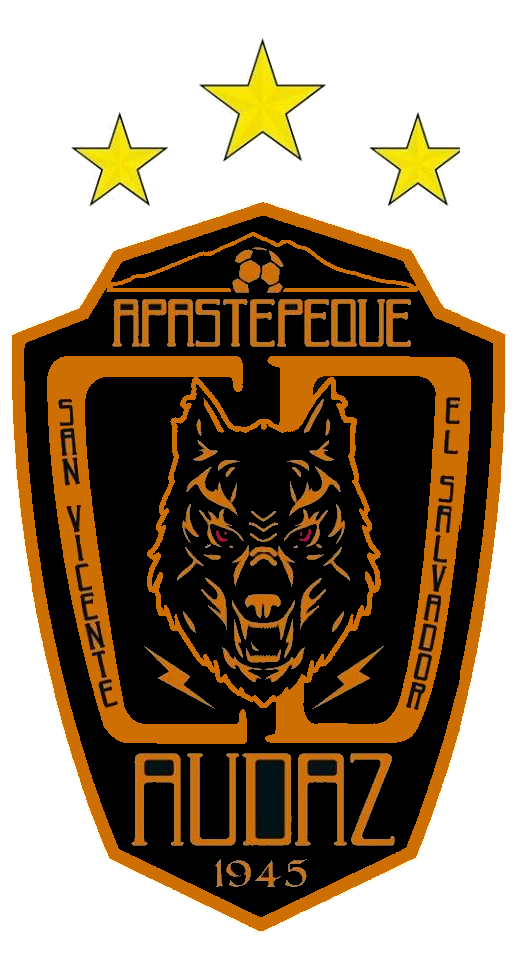
- Full name: Club Deportivo Audaz
- Nickname: Los Coyotes
- Founded: 1948
- Ground: Estadio La Coyotera, Apastepeque (19??–2017); various stadiums in San Vicente (2017–2019)
- Capacity: 10,000
- Chairman: (El Salvador) Lic.Vlanda Gongora
- Manager: (El Salvador) TBA
- League: (El Salvador) Liga de Ascenso
- 2026-2027: 9º (as C.D. Audaz)
Home colours

Club Deportivo Audaz commonly known as CD Audaz, or simply Audaz, was a Salvadoran association football club based in the town of Apastepeque, and briefly (the final two seasons) in the city of San Vicente, 6 km (3.7 mi) south of Apastepeque.

The club was founded in 1948, played for decades in non-professional league or semi-professional leagues or the third tier Tercera Division de Fútbol Salvadoreño professional league, then in 2014 started a sudden and successful run out of the Tercera through to the top tier Primera División de Fútbol de El Salvador, but the added costs for a small club playing in the higher tiers drove it to bankruptcy, folding in July 2019.

Audaz was known as Los Coyotes, and had a stylized Coyote symbol as its mascot. Reflecting this theme, the club's long-time home stadium was called Estadio La Coyotera.

The club currently plays in the Liga de Ascenso.

== History ==
=== 1948 local club to 2014 Tercera Champion ===
Audaz was founded in 1948, playing their home games at Estadio La Coyotera, a modest seating-capacity venue in the small town of Apastepeque. For most of their history, the club competed in fourth-tier and lower non-professional league and semi-professional leagues.

On 11 February 2001, Audaz' truck carrying the entire team and staff was shot at by gang members, killing coach José Napoleón Gómez.

Audaz had eventually progressed to the third-tier of league play in El Salvador, the tier-three Tercera Division de Fútbol Salvadoreño (Tercera División).

In the 2013–14 Trecera División season, Audaz won the second half title (Apertura 2014), earning its first ever promotion to the Segunda División de El Salvador (Segunda División).

=== Segunda: 2014 start to 2017 Champion ===
Audaz entered the Segunda División in the 2014–15 season.

In its third year in the Segunda División, Audaz won the second half Clausura 2017 title, defeating Independiente FC 4–1 in a two-legged final series, which included a 3–0 victory away from home. Audaz immediately faced Independiente FC again, the champions of the first half of the 2016–17 season (Apertura 2016), in a one-game promotion playoff, winning 1–0 on a goal by Santos Guzmán. The victory earned Audaz promotion to the top-tier Primera División de Fútbol de El Salvador (La Primera), just three years after they last played in the Tercera División.

=== La Primera: 2017 to 2019 financial struggles ===
Audaz entered La Primera for the 2017–18 season. The team immediately ran into financial issues, suffering from ticket sales that did not support their more costly operations in La Primera, and in July 2017 they started moving some of their home games away from Estadio La Coyotera, to the larger-capacity Estadio La Union in the nearby city of San Vicente, which had a population five times that of Apastepeque.

Audaz held their position in La Primera, but entered the 2018–19 Primera División de El Salvador with increasing financial difficulty. The team announced that they would abandon Estadio La Coyotera, and would play all their 2018–19 home games at Estadio La Union and Estadio Jiboa. In July 2018, before the season started, Juan Pablo Herrera and the Herrera family sold the team to a new ownership group, led by Roberto Campos. The team continued to lose money, and Campos tried to arrange a sale to the ownership of Independiente FC, which was still competing in the Segunda División, going so far as to change Audaz' colors to those of Independiente mid-season, starting in January 2019.

=== Recent History ===
Audaz again maintained their position in La Primera, but would not live to see the 2019–20 Primera División de El Salvador season. In July 2019, after the 2018–19 season was over, it was revealed that Campos had not meet his contractual requirements of the purchase from the previous owner's group, having failed to pay the salaries of the players and staff for most of the season; the team was bankrupt, no owner existed, and the sole remaining board member officially sold Audaz' license in La Primera to Independiente FC.

Just five years after winning the Tercera División title in May 2014, the quick but costly rise through Segunda División and into La Primera had ended the 61-year history of Club Deportivo Audaz.

However the club returned to professional football beginning their campaign in the Tercera Division in 2021. The club reaching the final twice however losing to Pipil and Zacatecoluca F.C.

== Stadium ==
The Estadio San Vicentia placed in neighbourhood of San Vicente. With a capacity of 15,000, t was inaugurated in.

Since its establishment in TBD, Audaz stadiums has been:

- Estadio La Coyotera, Apastepeque (TBD- 2017, 2021-Present)
  - Estadio San Vicentia (2017-2019) games played in this location during the first primera division season
  - Estadio Mauricio Vides de Ilobasco (2018) due to disagreement with the Council of San vicente, They moved home games to the Estadio Ilobasco
  - Complejo Deportivo de Tecoluca (2018) games played in this location during the primera division season

== Club records in La Primera ==
- First victory: 1-0 C.D. FAS August 13, 2017
- First goalscorer: Daley Mena v C.D. Pasaquina 5 September 2017
- Top goalscorer: Daley Mena and Santos Guzman 16 goals
- Largest Home victory, Primera División: 4–0 v Chalatenango, 2018
- Largest Away victory, Primera División: 2-1 v Dragon, 2017
  2-1 Isidro Metapan
- Largest Home loss, Primera División: 0–3 v Santa Tecla F.C., 2018
- Largest Away loss, Primera División: 0–4 v Limeno, 2017
  0-4 v Santa Tecla F.C., 2018
- Lowest home attendance: 63 v Isidro Metapan, 2018
- Youngest player: Orssy Rodríguez (15 years old) v Chalatenango January 2018

== Honours ==
=== Domestic honours ===
- Segunda División Salvadorean and predecessors
  - Champions: Clausura 2017
  - Promotion Play-off Winners: 2016–2017
- Tercera División Salvadorean and predecessors
  - Champions: Clausura 2014

== Current squad ==
As of 30 August 2026: Note: Flags indicate national team as defined under FIFA eligibility rules; some limited exceptions apply. Players may hold more than one non-FIFA nationality.

No.	Pos.	Nation	Player
—		SLV	TBD (captain)
—		SLV	
—		SLV	
—		SLV	
—		SLV	
—		SLV	
—		SLV	
—		SLV	
—		SLV	

No.	Pos.	Nation	Player
—		SLV	
—		SLV	
—		SLV	
—		SLV	
—		SLV	
—		SLV	

=== Players with dual citizenship ===
- (El Salvador) (United States) TBD

=== In ===
Note: Flags indicate national team as defined under FIFA eligibility rules; some limited exceptions apply. Players may hold more than one non-FIFA nationality.

No.	Pos.	Nation	Player
—		COL	Harry Alvarado (From TBD)
—		SLV	Andy Chacon (From TBD)
—		SLV	Victor Pereira (From TBD)
—		SLV	Ever Garcia Trejo (From TBD)
—		SLV	Kevin Viscarra (From TBD)
—		SLV	Kevin Ferrufino (From TBD)
—		SLV	Neftali Serrano (From TBD)
—		SLV	Diego Ponce (From TBD)

No.	Pos.	Nation	Player
—		SLV	Diego Mercado (From TBD)
—		SLV	Brayan Avalos (From TBD)
—		SLV	Erick Perez (From TBD)
—		SLV	TBD (From TBD)
—		SLV	TBD (From TBD)
—		SLV	TBD (From TBD)

=== Out ===
Note: Flags indicate national team as defined under FIFA eligibility rules; some limited exceptions apply. Players may hold more than one non-FIFA nationality.

No.	Pos.	Nation	Player
—		SLV	TBD (To TBD)
—		SLV	TBD (To TBD)
—		SLV	TBD (To TBD)
—		SLV	TBD (To TBD)

No.	Pos.	Nation	Player
—		SLV	TBD (To TBD)
—		SLV	TBD (To TBD)
—		SLV	TBD (To TBD)

== Managers ==
- (El Salvador) Armando Amaya (1982)
- (El Salvador) José Napoleón Gómez (2001)

The last thirteen managers of Audaz:

Name	Nat	From	To
Rubén Alonso	(Uruguay)	October 2014	March 2015
Flavio Rivas	(El Salvador)	March 2015	June 2015
Miguel Ángel Soriano	(El Salvador)	July 2015	August 2015
Flavio Rivas (Caretaker)	(El Salvador)	August 2015	September 2015
Juan Andrés Sarulyte	(Argentina)	September 2015	December 2015
Jorge Calles	(El Salvador)	December 2015	February 2016
Mario Mayén Meza	(El Salvador)	February 2016	April 2016
Wilson Angulo	(El Salvador)	April 2016	September 2016
Jorge Abrego	(El Salvador)	September 2016	December 2016
Germán Pérez	(Honduras)	January 2017	November 2017
Misael Alfaro	(El Salvador)	December 2017	February 2018
Emerson Umaña (caretaker)	(El Salvador)	February 2018	March 2018
Carlos Romero	(El Salvador)	March 2018	June 2018
Germán Pérez	(Honduras)	June 2018	September 2018
William Renderos Iraheta	(El Salvador)	September 2018	December 2018
Pablo Quiñónez	(Uruguay)	January 2019	July 2019
Hiatus		August 2019	March 2021
Edgardo Flores	(El Salvador)	April 2021	Present
Guillermo Rodriguez	(El Salvador)	2024	November 2024
Angel Orellana	(El Salvador)	November 2024	December 2024
Victor Coreas	(El Salvador)	December 2024	March 2025
Ricardo Garcia (Interim)	(El Salvador)	March 2025	March 2025
Jesus Alvarez (Mancha)	(El Salvador)	April 2025	June 2025
Omar Vasquez	(El Salvador)	June 2025	Present
Victor Coreas	(El Salvador)	January 2026	July 2026
Ivan Ruiz	(El Salvador)	July 2026	Present
