= Waldemar Acosta =

Uruguayan footballer (born 1986)

Personal information
- Full name: Waldemar Jesus Acosta Ferreira
- Date of birth: 25 August 1986 (age 40)
- Place of birth: Juan Lacaze, Uruguay
- Height: 1.87 m (6 ft 2 in)
- Position: Forward

Team information
- Current team: CD Águila
- Number: 7

Senior career*
Years	Team	Apps	(Gls)
2005–2008	Deportivo Colonia		
2009–2010	Brisbane Roar		
2011	Técnico Universitario	37	(19)
2012	Deportivo Quito	2	(1)
2012	Celaya	7	(0)
2013	Macará	17	(4)
2013	River Plate	15	(6)
2014	Técnico Universitario	10	(3)
2014	Plaza Colonia	14	(0)
2015	Fuerza Amarilla	34	(12)
2015–2016	Plaza Colonia	2	(0)
2016–2017	Xelajú	17	(4)
2017	LDU Portoviejo		
2018	Birkirkara	7	(2)
2018–2019	CD Águila	42	(21)
2019	Guabirá	14	(4)
2020–	CD Águila	10	(1)
- * Club domestic league appearances and goals

Waldemar Jesus Acosta Ferreira (born August 25, 1986, in Juan Lacaze) is a Uruguayan professional footballer who plays as a forward for C.D. Águila.

== Club career ==
Acosta has had a journeyman's career with several spells outside Uruguay, including Ecuador, El Salvador, Guatemala, Malta and Mexico.

=== Águila ===
Acosta signed with Águila of the Salvadoran Primera División for the Apertura 2018 tournament. Acosta finished the tournament as one of the best goal scorers, scoring 12 goals in 21 matches.

In November 2018, Acosta suffered a severe injury in a match against Audaz (2–2 draw) in the first leg of the quarterfinals of the Apertura 2018.

== Honours ==
Técnico Universitario

- Ecuadorian Serie B: 2011

C.D. Águila

- Primera División: Clausura 2019
