= Ulises Tavares =

Mexican footballer (born 1993)

Personal information
- Full name: Ulises de Jesús Tavares Reynoso
- Date of birth: 29 April 1993 (age 33)
- Place of birth: Tepatitlán de Morelos, Jalisco, México
- Height: 1.82 m (6 ft 0 in)
- Position: Forward

Youth career
- 2008–2011: Arandas Futbol Club
- 2012–2013: Estudiantes
- 2013–2014: Pumas de la UNAM

Senior career*
Years	Team	Apps	(Gls)
2015–2016	La Equidad	16	(1)
2017	Patriotas		
2018	Irapuato	10	(4)
2018	Sonsonate	15	(5)
2018	Saltillo	4	(0)
- * Club domestic league appearances and goals

Ulises de Jesús Tavares Reynoso (born 29 April 1993) is a Mexican professional footballer who plays as a forward.

== Club career ==
Tavares signed with Sonsonate of the Salvadoran Primera División for the Apertura 2018 tournament. Sonsonate finished in eleventh position in the league table with 18 points. He left the club in December 2018.
