= Edier Tello =

Colombian footballer (born 1990)

Personal information
- Full name: Edier Tello Mosquera
- Date of birth: March 2, 1990 (age 36)
- Place of birth: Cértegui, Chocó, Colombia
- Height: 1.68 m (5 ft 6 in)
- Position: Forward

Youth career
- 2007–2008: Millonarios F.C.

Senior career*
Years	Team	Apps	(Gls)
2009–2010	Millonarios F.C.		
2011	Academia F.C.		
2012–2013	Atlético F.C.		
2014	América de Cali		
2015	Millonarios F.C.		
2016	Jaguares de Córdoba		
2019	C.D. Luis Ángel Firpo		
- * Club domestic league appearances and goals

Edier Tello (born 2 March 1990) is a Colombian professional football forward. Tello is a product of the Millonarios F.C. youth system and played with the Millonarios F.C. first team since January, 2009.

== Statistics (Official games/Colombian Ligue and Colombian Cup) ==
(As of November 14, 2010)

Year	Team	Colombian Ligue Matches	Goals	Colombian Cup Matches	Goals	Total Matches	Total Goals
2009	Millonarios	8	0	8	0	16	0
2010	Millonarios	9	0	7	0	16	0
Total	Millonarios	17	1	15	0	32	1
