= Juan Carlos Portillo (footballer, born 1991) =

Salvadoran footballer

Personal information
- Full name: Juan Carlos Portillo Leal
- Date of birth: 31 December 1991 (age 34)
- Place of birth: Sonsonate, El Salvador
- Height: 1.79 m (5 ft 10 in)
- Position: Forward

Team information
- Current team: Alianza
- Number: 11

Senior career*
Years	Team	Apps	(Gls)
2012–2015	Juventud	102	(11)
2015–	Alianza	400	(80)

International career
2016–2021	El Salvador	23	(4)
- * Club domestic league appearances and goals as of 20:00, 25 May 2025 (UTC)

Juan Carlos Portillo Leal (born 31 December 1991) is a Salvadoran professional footballer who plays as a forward for and captains Primera División club Alianza.

== International career ==
Portillo made his El Salvador national football team debut on 1 June 2016 in a friendly against Armenia, as a starter. He was selected for the country's 2019 CONCACAF Gold Cup squad.

== Career statistics ==
=== International goals ===
Scores and results list El Salvador's goal tally first.

No.	Date	Venue	Opponent	Score	Result	Competition
1.	15 October 2019	Darren Sammy Cricket Ground, Gros Islet, Saint Lucia	Saint Lucia	2–0	2–0	2019–20 CONCACAF Nations League B
2.	16 November 2019	Estadio Cuscatlán, San Salvador, El Salvador	Montserrat	1–0	1–0	2019–20 CONCACAF Nations League B
3.	19 November 2019	Estadio Cuscatlán, San Salvador, El Salvador	Dominican Republic	1–0	2–0	2019–20 CONCACAF Nations League B
4.	5 June 2021	Bethlehem Soccer Stadium, Upper Bethlehem, U.S. Virgin Islands	U.S. Virgin Islands	2–0	7–0	2022 FIFA World Cup qualification

== Honours ==
Alianza

- Primera División de Fútbol de El Salvador: Apertura 2017, Clausura 2018, Apertura 2019, Apertura 2020, Apertura 2021, Clausura 2022, Clausura 2024
