= Felipe Ponce =

Mexican footballer (born 1988)

Personal information
- Full name: Felipe Ponce Ramírez
- Date of birth: 29 March 1988 (age 38)
- Place of birth: Ciudad Lerdo, Mexico
- Height: 1.77 m (5 ft 9 1/2 in)
- Position: Midfielder

Youth career
- –2007: Santos Laguna

Senior career*
| Years | Team | Apps | (Gls) |
| 2007–2008 | Santos Laguna II | | |
| 2008–2009 | UA de Tamaulipas | | |
| 2009–2012 | Loros UdeC | | |
| 2012–2013 | Veracruz | 5 | (0) |
| 2014–2016 | Atlético San Luis | 14 | (1) |
| 2016 | → Loros UdeC (loan) | 9 | (0) |
| 2017–2018 | Boyacá Chicó | 59 | (11) |
| 2019 | Speranța Nisporeni | 7 | (0) |
| 2019 | Deportivo Pasto | 4 | (0) |
| 2020 | Alianza | 20 | (7) |
| 2021 | Municipal Limeño | 11 | (1) |
- * Club domestic league appearances and goals as of 8 November 2021

Felipe Ponce Ramírez (born 29 March 1988) is a Mexican professional footballer who plays as a midfielder.

== Honours ==
Alianza

- Salvadoran Primera División: Apertura 2019
