= Jesús Dautt =

Mexican footballer (born 1990)

Personal information
- Full name: Jesús Alejandro Dautt Ramírez
- Date of birth: 3 March 1990 (age 36)
- Place of birth: Los Mochis, Mexico
- Height: 1.77 m (5 ft 10 in)
- Position: Goalkeeper

Team information
- Current team: Isidro Metapan (Goalkeeper coach)

Senior career*
Years	Team	Apps	(Gls)
2013-2016	Venados	16	(0)
2014	Dorados de Sinaloa	15	(0)
2015	Cafetaleros de Chiapas	5	(0)
2016	Pioneros de Cancún	13	(0)
2016	Atlante		
2017-2018	Lepaera F.C.		
2019	Vida	1	(0)
2020-2022	Santa Tecla	39	(0)
2022-2023	Once Deportivo	17	(0)
2023	Mesoamerica FC	1	(0)

International career^{‡}
2017	El Salvador U17		
- * Club domestic league appearances and goals as of 09:26, 12 June 2025 (UTC) ‡ National team caps and goals as of 09:26, 12 June 2025 (UTC)

Jesús Alejandro Dautt Ramírez (born 3 March 1990) is a Mexican professional footballer who plays for Santa Tecla FC of El Salvador.

He capped for Mexico at the under-17 level.
