= Rodrigo de Brito =

Argentine footballer

Personal information
- Full name: Rodrigo Luján De Brito
- Date of birth: 20 January 1992 (age 34)
- Place of birth: Buenos Aires, Argentina
- Height: 1.81 m (5 ft 11 1/2 in)
- Position: Defender

Team information
- Current team: CSD Chiquimulilla

Senior career*
Years	Team	Apps	(Gls)
2010	Club Atlético Independiente (under 18)		
2011	Club Atlético Independiente (reserves)		
2013–2014	Club Deportivo Municipal Cañar		
2014	US Palmese		
2015	Santa Tecla FC		
2015–2016	CD Aspirante		
2016	Turín FESA FC		
2017	Deportivo Sebaco		
2017	Cittanovese		
2018	CD Luis Ángel Firpo	37	(1)
2018–2019	CD Municipal Limeño		
2020	Santa Tecla FC		
2020	Zacapa		
2021-2023	Yaracuyanos		
2023	Desamparados		
2024	Deportivo Quiché FC		
2024-	CSD Chiquimulilla		
- * Club domestic league appearances and goals

Rodrigo Luján De Brito (born January 20, 1992, in Buenos Aires) is an Argentinian professional football player, who plays as a defender.

== Club career ==
=== Santa Tecla ===
In 2015 de Brito signed with Santa Tecla. With Santa Tecla de Brito won the Clausura 2015 final against Isidro Metapán on penalties.

=== Luis Ángel Firpo ===
For the Clausura 2018 tournament de Brito signed with C.D. Luis Ángel Firpo. However, with the team of Usulután de Brito experienced a serious institutional, economic and sports crisis. The severe delay in salary payments led him to leave the team in the Apertura 2018 tournament, after a 2–1 victory against C.D. Pasaquina in the Sergio Torres Stadium.

== Honours ==
=== Club ===
Santa Tecla F.C.

- Primera División
  - Champion: Clausura 2015
