= Nicolas Munoz =

France & Spain international rugby league footballer

Playing information
- Position: Scrum-half, Hooker, Halfback
Club
Years	Team	Pld	T	G	FG	P
20??	Lézignan Sangliers
Representative
Years	Team	Pld	T	G	FG	P
2010	France	4	0	9	0	18
2016	Spain	1	0	0	0	0
- As of 30 November 2023

Nicolas Munoz is a French professional rugby league footballer who played in the 2000s and 2010s. He played for Lézignan Sangliers of the French Rugby League Championship, as well as a France international representative.

He has been named in the France training squad for the 2008 Rugby League World Cup.

Munoz represented France in the 2010 European Cup.
