= Jeison Quiñones =

Colombian footballer (born 1986)

Personal information
- Full name: Jeison Arley Quiñones Angulo
- Date of birth: 17 September 1986 (age 40)
- Place of birth: Tumaco, Colombia
- Height: 1.80 m (5 ft 11 in)
- Position: Forward

Youth career
- Deportes Tolima

Senior career*
Years	Team	Apps	(Gls)
2005–2007	Deportes Tolima		
2007	Portuguesa FC		
2008	Expreso Rojo		
2009–2011	Atlético Huila	29	(8)
2012	Expreso Rojo	2	(1)
2012	ESPOLI	9	(7)
2013	Unión Magdalena	19	(4)
2013	Cúcuta Deportivo	10	(1)
2014	Petrolero	22	(9)
2015	León de Huánuco	9	(1)
2015	→ Alianza Universidad (loan)	5	(1)
2016–2017	Petrolero	40	(13)
2017	Ciclón Tarija		
2018	Real Potosí		
2018–2019	Pasaquina	42	(21)
2019	CD FAS	21	(6)
2020	11 Deportivo	7	(0)
2020–2021	Municipal Limeño	8	(1)
2021	San Pablo Municipal		
- * Club domestic league appearances and goals

Jeison Arley Quiñones Angulo (born 17 September 1986) is a Colombian professional footballer, who plays as a forward.

== Career ==
Quiñones played club football with Atlético Huila, Portuguesa FC, Deportes Tolima and Expreso Rojo before joining Unión Magdalena in January 2013.

=== Pasaquina ===
Quiñones signed with Pasaquina of the Salvadoran Primera División in the Apertura 2018 tournament. However, Pasaquina did not qualify for the quarter-finals of that tournament. Quiñones scored 8 goals in 21 games with the team of La Unión.
