= Rubén Marroquín =

Salvadoran footballer (born 1992)

Personal information
- Full name: Rubén Eduardo Marroquín Meléndez
- Date of birth: 10 May 1992 (age 34)
- Place of birth: Cuscatancingo, El Salvador
- Height: 1.67 m (5 ft 6 in)
- Position: Defender

Team information
- Current team: Inter FA

Senior career*
Years	Team	Apps	(Gls)
2012–2014	Turín FESA		
2014–2017	FAS	90	(0)
2017–2022	Alianza	148	(0)
2022–2023	FAS	22	(0)
2023–2025	Municipal Limeño	68	(0)
2025–	Inter FA	0	(0)

International career
- El Salvador U17
2017–2020	El Salvador	6	(0)
- * Club domestic league appearances and goals as of 19 May 2024

Rubén Eduardo Marroquín Meléndez (born 10 May 1992), nicknamed El Polaco ("The Polish Man"), is a Salvadoran professional footballer who plays as a defender for Primera División club Inter FA.

== Club career ==
On 17 June 2025, it was confirmed that Marroquín would join newly founded Inter FA.

== International career ==
Marroquín was selected to be an alternate in case of the injury for Salvador's squad at the 2015 CONCACAF Gold Cup, but was not called up.

He made his El Salvador national football team debut on 17 July 2017, in a 2017 CONCACAF Gold Cup game against Jamaica, as a starter.

He was also selected for El Salvador's 2019 CONCACAF Gold Cup squad.
