= Óscar Cerén =

Salvadoran footballer (born 1991)

Personal information
- Full name: Óscar Elías Cerén Delgado
- Date of birth: 26 October 1991 (age 35)
- Place of birth: Quezaltepeque, El Salvador
- Height: 1.67 m (5 ft 6 in)
- Position: Midfielder

Team information
- Current team: Isidro Metapán
- Number: 9

Senior career*
Years	Team	Apps	(Gls)
2009–2014	Juventud Independiente	107	(20)
2014–2015	Águila	30	(4)
2015–2016	Isidro Metapán	45	(8)
2016–2022	Alianza	236	(42)
2022-2023	Isidro Metapán	17	(1)
2023-Present	Águila	18	(0)

International career^{‡}
2013–2021	El Salvador	38	(5)
- * Club domestic league appearances and goals as of 4 March 2023 ‡ National team caps and goals as of 7 March 2019

Óscar Elías Cerén Delgado (born 26 October 1991) is a Salvadoran professional footballer who plays as a midfielder for Primera División club Isidro Metapán and the El Salvador national team. His brother Darwin Cerén also plays for the national team.

== International goals ==
Scores and results list El Salvador's goal tally first.

No.	Date	Venue	Opponent	Score	Result	Competition
1.	25 March 2015	Estadio Cuscatlán, San Salvador, El Salvador	Dominican Republic	2–0	2–0	Friendly
2.	8 September 2018	Blakes Estate Stadium, Lookout, Montserrat	Montserrat	1–1	2–1	2019–20 CONCACAF Nations League qualification
3.	8 September 2018	Blakes Estate Stadium, Lookout, Montserrat	Montserrat	2–1	2–1	2019–20 CONCACAF Nations League qualification
4.	7 March 2019	Banc of California Stadium, Los Angeles, United States	Guatemala	1–0	3–1	Friendly
5.	27 March 2019	RFK Stadium, Washington, D.C., United States	Peru	2–0	2–0	Friendly

== Honours ==
Juventud Independiente

- Segunda División de El Salvador: 2011

Alianza F.C.

- Primera División: Apertura 2017, Clausura 2018, Apertura 2019, Apertura 2020, Apertura 2021

Individual

- Copa Centroamericana Best XI: 2017
