= Jonathan Jiménez (footballer, born 1992) =

Salvadoran footballer (born 1992)

Personal information
- Full name: Jonathan David Jiménez Guzmán
- Date of birth: 12 July 1992 (age 34)
- Place of birth: San Salvador, El Salvador
- Height: 1.67 m (5 ft 6 in)
- Position: Midfielder

Team information
- Current team: Alianza
- Number: 15

Senior career*
| Years | Team | Apps | (Gls) |
| 2013–2015 | UES | 54 | (6) |
| 2015–2017 | FAS | 72 | (6) |
| 2017– | Alianza | 128 | (5) |

International career^{‡}
| 2015– | El Salvador | 21 | (0) |
- * Club domestic league appearances and goals as of 17 February 2021 ‡ National team caps and goals as of 18 June 2019

Jonathan David Jiménez Guzmán, known as Jonathan Jiménez (born 12 July 1992) is a Salvadoran professional footballer who plays as a midfielder for Primera División club Alianza.

== International career ==
He made his El Salvador national football team debut on 17 November 2015 in a World Cup qualifier against Canada, as a 64th-minute substitute for Dustin Corea.

He was selected for the country's 2019 CONCACAF Gold Cup squad, after remaining an unused stand-by player for the 2015 edition of the competition.
