= Claro El Salvador =

Salvadorian telecommunications operator

- Type: Subsidiary of América Móvil
- Traded as: NYSE: AMX
- Industry: Telecommunications
- Founded: 1999
- Headquarters: Flagship headquarters: Mexico; Local headquarters: San Salvador
- Key people: Daniel Hajj Aboumrad (CEO, AMX); Carlos J. García Moreno (CFO, AMX)
- Products: Broadband; Mobile phone Telephone; Television (Quadruple Player); UMTS/HSDPA, CDMA, GSM, Wireless Data Services, Push to Talk
- Parent: América Móvil
- Website: claro.com.sv

Claro (formerly CTE Telecom) is a mobile and fixed phone, broadband and television service provider in El Salvador.

Formerly controlled by parent company CTE Telecom in El Salvador (owned by América Móvil of Mexico), the company started its Wireless service as "Personal" around 1999, and later added "ALÓ" with the motto "Facil y Rapido" (Spanish for "Easy and Fast "). In 2009, America Movil unified the brand in Latin America under the name Claro.
