= William Renderos =

Salvadoran footballer and manager (born 1971)

Personal information
- Full name: William Alexander Renderos Iraheta
- Date of birth: 3 October 1971 (age 55)
- Place of birth: El Salvador
- Positions: Left winger; striker

Senior career*
Years	Team	Apps	(Gls)
1988–1995	FAS		
1995–1996	LA Firpo		
1997–1999	FAS		
2000–2001	Boston Bulldogs		
2001–2003	Isidro Metapán		
2003–2006	Once Lobos		

International career
1991–2001	El Salvador	60	(6)

Managerial career
- 2009: Brasilia
- 2011: Alianza (reserves)
- 2011: FAS
- 2013: Santa Tecla FC
- 2014–2015: UES
- 2016: Sonsonate
- 2017–2018: Chalatenango
- 2018: Audaz
- 2018–2019: Municipal Limeño
- 2020: Independiente
- 2020: LA Firpo
- 2020: Inter Silva
- 2021: El Salvador U-23 (assistant)
- 2023-2024: Municipal Limeño
- 2025-Present: Inter FA
- * Club domestic league appearances and goals

William Alexander Renderos Iraheta (born 3 October 1971) is a former Salvadoran professional footballer and currently manager of CD Municipal Limeño.

== Club career ==
Renderos started his professional football career at FAS where he would stay for twelve years, except for a short period at Luis Ángel Firpo.

After playing two years with the Boston Bulldogs of A-League, Renderos signed with Isidro Metapán in 2001, in a squad which also featured the likes of veterans Carlos Castro Borja, Adolfo Menéndez and Guillermo Rivera.

He then had his final playing stint with Segunda División club Once Lobos, with whom he won promotion to the Primera División de Fútbol de El Salvador in June 2004.

== Coaching career ==
=== Brasilia ===
Renderos began his career as a coach with Brasilia of Suchitoto in 2009.

=== FAS ===
In July 2011 he took the reins at FAS, being his first experience as a coach in a team of the Primera División de Fútbol de El Salvador, after leading Alianza's reserves to the reserve's league title, but was then replaced by Edgar Henríquez.

=== Santa Tecla ===
Renderos signed as new coach of Santa Tecla in the Apertura 2013. However, the team had an irregular start in the tournament. Iraheta resigned from Santa Tecla after a defeat against Juventud Independiente (1–6) in the Estadio Las Delicias, being replaced by Edgar Henríquez. Santa Tecla would finish in eighth place in that tournament.

=== UES ===
In February 2014 Renderos signed as new coach of UES for the Clausura 2014 tournament, his debut match was a 1–2 defeat against Atlético Marte in the Estadio Cuscatlán. Iraheta continues with the team for the Apertura 2015 tournament, and the results started well for UES after a 1–1 away draw against Alianza, but a 1–2 home defeat against Pasaquina in the Estadio Jorge "Mágico" González began a run of bad results that ended in the resigned of Iraheta after a 0–2 defeat against Sonsonate in the Estadio Anna Mercedes Campos, after 9 games, being replaced by Efraín Burgos.

=== Sonsonate ===
Renderos signed with Sonsonate, replacing Edwin Portillo in the remained of the Clausura 2016 tournament and for the Apertura 2016 tournament. However, the team had poor results and after a defeat against UES (0–4) in the Estadio Universitario Iraheta resigned from Sonsonate.

=== Chalatenango ===
In 2017, Iraheta signed as new coach of Chalatenango, replacing Ricardo Serrano. His work in the team was involved in polemic, then, there was controversy about who was the real coach of Chalatenango, if Renderos or the then sports director of the club, Carlos Mijangos. Iraheta was fired from Chalatenango in the Clausura 2018 tournament (in the middle of an institutional and economic crisis) after a 2–3 defeat against Isidro Metapán, being replaced by Giovanni Portillo. Iraheta led the "Chalatecos" for 24 games, where he scored eight wins, seven draws and nine defeats.

=== Audaz ===
In the middle of the Apertura 2018 tournament, Renderos signed as new coach of Audaz replacing to German Pérez. In November, Audaz got to classified for the quarter-finals of the Apertura 2018 after defeating FAS 1–0 at the Estadio Cuscatlán.

=== Municipal Limeño ===
In December 2018, Renderos signed as new coach of C.D. Municipal Limeño for the Clausura 2019, replacing Omar Sevilla.

== International career ==
He represented El Salvador in international play throughout the 1990s. During the effort to qualify for the 1998 FIFA World Cup, in which El Salvador narrowly missed out, Renderos was a frequent starter in the forward line or on the left of midfield.

Renderos made his debut for El Salvador in an April 1991 UNCAF Nations Cup match against Nicaragua and has earned a total of 57 caps, scoring 5 goals.

He has represented his country in 14 FIFA World Cup qualification matches and played at the 1991, 1993, 1995, 1997 and 1999 UNCAF Nations Cups as well as at the 1996. and 1998 CONCACAF Gold Cups.

He did not play many internationals after leaving his country to play in the USA but was recalled for a World Cup qualification match against Jamaica in August 2000.

=== International goals ===
Scores and results list El Salvador's goal tally first.

#	Date	Venue	Opponent	Score	Result	Competition
1	4 April 1993	Estadio Cuscatlán, San Salvador, El Salvador	Mexico	2–1	2–1	1994 FIFA World Cup qualification
2	25 September 1996	Memorial Coliseum, Los Angeles, United States	Guatemala	2–1	2–1	Friendly match
3	1 December 1996	Estadio Cuscatlán, San Salvador, El Salvador	Cuba	1–0	3–0	1998 FIFA World Cup qualification
4	14 September 1997	Estadio Cuscatlán, San Salvador, El Salvador	Canada	2–1	4–1	1998 FIFA World Cup qualification
5	5 March 2000	Estadio Cuscatlán, San Salvador, El Salvador	Belize	5–0	5–0	2002 FIFA World Cup qualification

== Honours ==
=== Player ===
==== Club ====
C.D. FAS

- Primera División de Fútbol de El Salvador
  - Champion: 1994–95
  - Runners-up: 1997-98, Clausura 1999

LA Firpo

  - Runners-up: 1996-97,

==== As a coach ====
- Alianza Reserves
  - Primera División Reserves (El Salvador) Champion (2): Apertura 2010, Clausura 2011
- Municipal Limeno
  - Primera División de Fútbol de El Salvador Runners-up (1): Clausura 2024

== Managerial stats ==
Team	Nat	From	To	Record				
Team	Nat	From	To	G	W	D	L	%
Santa Tecla	El Salvador	TBD	TBD	28	0	0	0	%
FAS	El Salvador	TBD	TBD	20	0	0	0	%
TBD	El Salvador	TBD	TBD	0	0	0	0	%
Inter FA	El Salvador	June 2025	September 2025	8	0	4	4	%
