= List of Alianza F.C. records and statistics =

This article lists various statistics related to Alianza Futbol Clube.

All stats accurate as of 24 January 2025.

== Honours ==
As of 24 January 2025, Alianza have won 18 Primera División titles, one UNCAF Club Championship and one CONCACAF Champions' Cup trophies.

=== Domestic competitions ===
==== League ====
Primera División

- Winners (18): 1965–66, 1966–67, 1986–87, 1989–90, 1993–94, 1996–97, Apertura 1998, Apertura 2001, Clausura 2004, Clausura 2011, Apertura 2015, Apertura 2017, Clausura 2018, Apertura 2019, Apertura 2020, Apertura 2021, Clausura 2022 & Clausura 2024

==== Cup ====
Copa Santa Ana

- Winners (1): 1977

=== CONCACAF competitions ===
==== Official titles ====
- CONCACAF Champions' Cup: 1
- Winners (1): ::1967
- UNCAF Club Championship: 1
- Winners (1): ::1997

Runner-up (1): 1980

== Individual awards ==
=== Award winners ===
Top Goalscorer (9)

The following players have won the Goalscorer while playing for Alianza:

- (Panama) Luis Ernesto Tapia (23) – 1965-66
- (Panama) Luis Ernesto Tapia (25) – 1966-67
- (Brazil) Odir Jaques (30) – 1967-1968
- (El Salvador) Silvio Aquino (1980-1981)
- (Uruguay) Ruben Alonso (15) – 1987-88
- (El Salvador) Rodrigo Alfonso Osorio † (10) – Apertura 1998
- (Colombia) Martín García (11) – Clausura 2005
- (El Salvador) Alex Amílcar Erazo (9) – Apertura 2005
- (El Salvador) Francisco Jovel Álvarez (11) – Apertura 2007
- (Brazil) José Oliveira de Souza (11) – 2010 Clausura
- (El Salvador) Rodolfo Zelaya (9) – Apertura 2010
- (El Salvador) Rodolfo Zelaya (13) – Clausura 2011
- (Jamaica) Sean Fraser (12) – Apertura 2012
- (El Salvador) Rodolfo Zelaya (12) – Apertura 2015
- (Paraguay) Gustavo Guerreño (15) – Apertura 2017
- (El Salvador) Rodolfo Zelaya (14) – Apertura 2018
- (Colombia) Bladimir Diaz (16) – Clausura 2019
- (El Salvador) Rodolfo Zelaya (8) – Clausura 2021
- (Colombia) Duvier Riascos (16) – Apertura 2021

== Goalscorers ==
- Most goals scored in all Competitions : **176** - - Rodolfo Zelaya
- Most League goals: **TBD** -
- Most League goals (Apertura/Clausura): **170** - Rodolfo Zelaya
- Most Finals goals: **32** - Rodolfo Zelaya
- Most goalscoring winner: **5** - Rodolfo Zelaya
- Most League goals in a season: **30** - Odir Jaques, Primera Division, 1967-1968
- Most goals scored by an Alianza player in a match: **TBD** - TBD v. TBD (TBD 7-2 TBD), DAY MONTH YEAR
- Most goals scored by an Alianza player in an International match: **TBD** - TBD & TBD v. TBD, DAY MONTH YEAR
- Most goals scored in CONCACAF competition: **TBD** - tbd, tbd

=== Goals ===
Place	Name	Period	Primera Division	Playoffs	SLV Cup	Continental	Total
1	(El Salvador) Rodolfo Zelaya	2008-2009, 2010-2013, 2013–2019, 2020-2025	170	32	0	6	176
2	(El Salvador) **Juan Carlos Portillo**	2015-Present	83	0	0	0	83
3	(El Salvador) Joaquín “Kin” Canales	1981-1997	81	0	0	0	81
4	(El Salvador) Adonai Martinez	1994-2003	73	0	0	0	**73**
5	(El Salvador) Emerson Mauricio	2021-2025	47	0	0	4	50
5	(El Salvador) (Colombia) **Michell Mercado**	2020-Present	47	0	0	0	47
5	(Argentina) Horacio Lugo	1996-1997, 2000	0	0	0	0	**0**
6	(Brazil) Odir Jacques	1968	30	0	0	0	30
7	(Jamaica) Sean Fraser	2012, 2013	34	0	0	0	**0**
8	(Panama) Luis Ernesto Tapia	1963-1970	0	0	0	0	0
9	(Chile) Ricardo Sepúlveda	1965-1968	0	0	0	0	**0**
10	(Colombia) Martín García	2003–2004	29	0	0	0	**29**
11	(El Salvador) Julio Palacios Lozano	1983-1994	0	0	0	0	**0**
12	(Uruguay) Ruben Alonso	1985-1987	0	0	0	0	**0**

Note: Players in bold text are still active with Club Deportivo Alianza.

==== Historical goals ====
Goal	Name	Date	Match
1st goal	(El Salvador) TBD	June 1958	Alianza 2 – TBD 1
1st in Primera Division	(El Salvador) TBD	Day Month Year	Alianza 2 – TBD 1
100th	(El Salvador) TBD	Day Month Year	Alianza 2 – TBD 1
500th	(El Salvador) TBD	Day Month Year	Alianza 2 – TBD 1
1000th	(Argentina) TBD	Day Month Year2	Alianza 1 – FAS 1
1500th	(El Salvador) TBD	Day Month Year	Alianza 2 – TBD 1
2000th	(El Salvador) TBD	Day Month Year	Alianza 2 – TBD 1
2500th	(Uruguay) TBD	Day Month Year	Alianza 2 – TBD 1
3000th	(Colombia) Luis Torres (Own Goal)	21 March 2009	FAS 2 – Vista Hermosa 1

== Players ==
=== Appearances ===
Competitive, professional matches only including substitution, number of appearances as a substitute appears in brackets.

Last updated 25 September 2025

	Name	Years	Primera División	Finals	CCL	Total
1	(El Salvador) Ramiro Carballo	1997-2002, 2005-2009	422 (-)	(-)	(-)	422 (-)
2	(El Salvador) Juan Carlos Portillo	2015-Present	400 (80)	(-)	(-)	400 (80)
3	(El Salvador) Óscar Navarro	1997-2008	389 (-)	(-)	(-)	389 (-)
4	(El Salvador) Rodolfo Zelaya	2008-2009, 2010-2018, 2020-2025	369 (172)	(-)	16 (-)	385 (-)
5	(El Salvador) Joaquín Canales	1980-1988, 1989-1997	366 (-)	(-)	(-)	366 (-)
6	(El Salvador) Milton Melendez	1991-2000	346 (-)	(-)	(-)	346 (-)
7	(El Salvador) Marvin Monterroza	2017-2024	282 (-)	(-)	(-)	282 (-)
8	(El Salvador) Narciso Orellana	2017-Present	257 (-)	(-)	(-)	257 (-)
9	(El Salvador) Henry Romero	2017-Present	250 (-)	(-)	(-)	250 (-)
10	(El Salvador) Ivan Mancia	2017-Present	247 (-)	(-)	(-)	247 (-)

==== Other appearances records ====
- Youngest first-team player: 17 years, 114 days – (El Salvador) TBD v TBD, Primera Division, Day Month Year
- Oldest post-Second World War player: 38 years, 233 days – (El Salvador) TBD v TBD, Primera Division, Day Month Year
- Most appearances in Primera Division: TBD – (El Salvador) TBD
- Most appearances in Copa Presidente: TBD – (El Salvador) TBD
- Most appearances in International competitions: TBD – (El Salvador) TBD
- Most appearances in CONCACAF competitions: TBD – (El Salvador) TBD
- Most appearances in UNCAF competitions: TBD – (El Salvador) TBD
- Most appearances in CONCACAF Champions League: TBD – (El Salvador) TBD
- Most appearances in UNCAF Copa: TBD (El Salvador) TBD
- Most appearances in FIFA Club World Cup: 2

- (Brazil) Zózimo

- Most appearances as a foreign player in all competitions: TBD – (Brazil) TBD
- Most appearances as a foreign player in Primera Division: TBD – (Brazil) TBD
- Most consecutive League appearances: TBD – (El Salvador) TBD – from Month Day, Year at Month Day, Year
- Shortest appearance: –

== Records ==
=== Scorelines ===
- Record League victory: 7–0 vs. C.D. Santa Clara, Clausura 1999, 18 April 1999
  vs. Once Municipal (Clausura 2013)
- Record League Defeat: TBD-TBD v TBD, Primera division, Day Month Year
- Record Cup victory: TBD–TBD v TBD, Presidente Cup, TBD
- Record CONCACAF Champions League Victory: 10-1 v Deportivo La Previsora, 29 April 1990
- Record CONCACAF Champions League defeat: TBD–TBD v TBD, TBD, TBD
- Record CONCACAF League Victory: 2-1 v Platense, 2 August 2017 and 8 August 2017
- Record CONCACAF League defeat: 1-3 v Olimpia, 24 August 2017
- Record UNCAF Victory: 7–2 v Panama Viejo, 19 February 2000
- Record UNCAF defeat: 0-3 v Saprissa, 1970
  Comunicaciones, 1976
  Cartaginés 1976
  Aurora, 1979
  1-4 Olimpia, 1979

=== Sequences ===
- Most wins in a row: TBD, TBD - TBD
- Most home wins in a row (all competitions): TBD, TBD– TBD
- Most home league wins in a row: TBD, TBD - TBD
- Most away wins in a row: TBD, TBD – TBD
- Most draws in a row: TBD, TBD
- Most home draws in a row: TBD, TBD
- Most away draws in a row: TBD, TBD
- Most defeats in a row: 8, TBD
- Most home defeats in a row: TBD, TBD
- Most away defeats in a row: TBD, TBD
- Longest unbeaten run: 42, 2017 Clausura (30 July 2017) - 2018 Apertura (28 March 2018)
- Longest unbeaten run at home: TBD, TBD
- Longest unbeaten run away: TBD, TBD
- Longest winless run: TBD, TBD – TBD
- Longest winless run at home: TBD, TBD – TBD
- Longest winless run away: TBD, TBD - TBD

=== Seasonal ===
- Most goals in all competitions in a season: TBD - TBD
- Most League goals in a season: 83 goals - 1965-66
- Fewest league goals conceded in a season: 6 - 1981
- Most points in a season (): 50 points - 1965-1966 season
- Most points in a season (Apertura/Clausura): TBD - , TBD
- Most League wins in a season (): TBD – TBD
- Most League wins in a season (Apertura/Clausura): TBD – TBD
- Most home League wins in a season: TBD – TBD
- Most away League wins in a season: TBD – TBD

=== Internationals ===
- Most international caps (total while at club): TBD - TBD - El Salvador

=== Attendances ===
- Highest home attendance: TBD, TBD
- Highest away attendance: TBD v TBD, TBD, TBD, TBD

=== Other ===
- Alianza was one of four teams (Aguila, Platense and Vista Hermosa to win a championship following promotion to Primera division.
- Alianza was the first Salvadoran team to win the CONCACAF Champions' Cup, which they achieved in 1967
- Alianza were the last Salvadoran team to win the UNCAF Interclub Cup, which they achieved in 1997.
- Alianza are the last Salvadoran team to win an international title, which was the UNCAF Interclub Cup in 1997
- Alianza became the only team to go unbeaten in a season (Apertura 2017)

== Internationals ==
The following players represented their countries while playing for Alianza (the figure in brackets is the number of caps gained while an Alianza player. Many of these players also gained caps while at other clubs.) Figures for active players (in bold) last updated 2021

Chile

- Luis Hernán Álvarez
- Adolfo Olivares

Colombia

- Edgar Ramos

Costa Rica

- Pedro Cubillo
- Eduardo Tanque Ramirez
- Claudio Jara
- Johnny Woodly

Cuba

- Yaikel Pérez

Dominican Republic

- Jonathan Faña
- Gabriel Ernesto Núñez

El Salvador

- Arturo Albarran
- Efraín Alas
- Mauricio Alfaro
- Misael Alfaro
- Rodolfo Álfaro
- Elvin Alvarado
- Francisco Álvarez
- Alexander Amaya
- Luis Anaya
- Silvio Aquino
- Reynaldo Argueta
- Óscar Daniel Arroyo
- Héctor Ávalos
- Carlos Ayala
- Rafael Barrientos
- Jonathan Barrios
- Marvin Benitez
- Nelson Bonilla
- Jorge Búcaro
- Efraín Burgos
- Junior Burgos
- Rafael Burgos
- William Torres Cabrera
- Alexander Campos
- Eduardo Campos
- Joaquín Canales
- William Canales
- Ramiro Carballo
- Christian Castillo
- Mario Castillo
- Julio Castro
- Oscar Ceren
- Ronald Cerritos
- William Chachagua
- Raúl Chamagua
- Nicolás Chávez
- Rudy Clavel
- Marlón Cornejo
- Rudis Corrales
- Jorge Cruz
- Raúl Cruz
- Washington de la Cruz
- Jaime Vladimir Cubías
- David Diaz
- Marcelo Díaz
- René Oswaldo Durán
- Alex Erazo
- Alexander Escobar
- Héctor Joaquín Escobar
- Ramón Fagoaga
- Gualberto Fernández
- Elder Figueroa
- Josué Flores
- Nelson Flores
- Gerardo Galán
- José Roberto García
- Ernesto Góchez
- Edwin González
- Mario González
- Mauricio González
- Miguel González
- Selvin González
- Mario Guevara
- Isidro Gutiérrez
- Alejandro Henríquez
- Andrés Hernández
- Edgar Henríquez
- Gonzalo Henríquez
- Ever Hernández
- Henry Hernandez
- Irvin Herrera
- José Antonio Infantozzi
- Andrés Flores Jaco
- Mario Jacobo
- Jonathan Jiménez
- Óscar Jiménez
- Alexander Larín
- Jorge Lievano
- Cristián Ernesto López
- Gustavo Alonso López
- Héctor López
- Raúl Magaña
- Ivan Mancia
- Salvador Mariona
- Marvin Márquez
- Rubén Marroquín
- Abilio Martínez
- Adonai Martínez
- Jose Orlando Martinez
- Juan Ramón Martínez
- Julio Martínez
- Emerson Mauricio
- Jaime Medina
- Francisco Medrano
- Diego Mejía
- Kevin Melara
- Carlos Antonio Meléndez
- Milton Meléndez
- Kevin Menjívar
- Leonardo Menjívar
- José Alexander Merino
- Marcelo Messias
- Mario Mayén Meza
- Erick Molina
- Mario Monge
- Elias Montes
- Miguel Montes
- Marvin Monterroza
- Luis Guevara Mora
- Guillermo Morán
- Sergio Iván Muñoz
- Óscar Navarro
- Fredy Orellana
- Maikon Orellana
- Narciso Orellana
- Harold Osorio
- Saturnino Osorio
- Juan Ramón Pacheco
- Juan Carlos López Padilla
- Julio Palacios
- Martín Pantoja
- José Ángel Peña
- Ronald Pimentel
- Alexander Enrique Pinto
- Dagoberto Portillo
- Isaac Portillo
- Jaime Portillo
- Juan Carlos Portillo
- José Quintanilla
- Mario Quintanilla
- Mauricio Quintanilla
- Juan Gilberto Quinteros
- José Amílcar Ramírez
- Rene Ramos
- Carlos Recinos
- Alexis Renderos
- Ezequiel Rivas
- Roberto Rivas
- Carlos Rivera
- Guillermo Rivera
- Rodrigo Rivera
- Jaime Rodríguez
- Jorge Rodríguez
- Óscar Rodríguez
- Nelson Rojas
- Henry Romero
- Osael Romero
- William Noè Rosales
- Alfredo Ruano
- David Rugamas
- Dennis Salinas
- Christian Sánchez
- Ramón Sánchez
- Herbert Sosa
- Bryan Tamacas
- Danny Torres
- Rolando Torres
- Víctor Turcios
- Óscar Ulloa
- Víctor Velásquez
- Luis Ramírez Zapata
- Isaac Zelaya
- Rodolfo Zelaya

Gabon

- Didier Ovono

Guatemala

- Edward Cocherari

Honduras

- Ramón Maradiaga
- Abel Rodríguez
- Elvis Scott
- Patrocinio Sierra

Jamaica

- Sean Fraser

Netherlands Antilles

- Roland Albert Martell

Nicaragua

- Armando Collado
- Cyril Errington

Panama

- Erick Ortega
- Luis Ernesto Tapia
- Francisco Portillo
- Orlando Rodríguez
- Anel Canales
- Alberto Zapata
- Nicolás Muñoz

Paraguay

- Julián Coronel

Peru

- Percy Aguilar

Sierra Leone

- John Trye

Trinidad and Tobago

- Willis Plaza

Uruguay

- Julio César Cortés
- Alejandro Curbelo
- Gustavo Faral
- Carlos Reyes
- Yari Silvera

=== Record versus other clubs ===
As of 2022-04-07

The Concacaf opponents below = Official tournament results: (Plus a sampling of other results)

Opponent	Last Meeting	G	W	D	L	F	A	PTS	+/-
(Mexico) Club America	Friendly	1	1	0	0	2	0	+3	+2
(Brazil) CR Flamengo	Friendly	1	1	0	0	3	2	3	+1
(Ecuador) Club Sport Emelec	Friendly	1	0	1	0	1	1	1	0
(Brazil) Santos FC	17 January 1971, Friendly	2	1	0	1	3	3	3	0
(Uruguay) Peñarol	Friendly	1	0	1	0	0	0	1	0
Totals									

=== Historical matches ===
June 3, 1963 Friendly	**Alianza F.C.**	**0-2**	**Madureira**	San Salvador, El Salvador
	Nil		TBD; TBD	Stadium: Estadio Flor Blanca

January 16, 1964 Friendly	**Alianza F.C.**	**1-5**	**São Paulo FC**	San Salvador, El Salvador
	TBD		TBD; TBD; TBD	Stadium: Estadio Flor Blanca

January 16, 1966 Friendly	**Alianza F.C.**	**2-1**	**Santos FC**	San Salvador, El Salvador
	Juan Ramón Verón 58'; Ricardo Sepúlveda 89'		Pelé 43'	Stadium: Estadio Flor Blanca

May 1, 1966 Friendly	**Alianza F.C.**	**3-2**	**Flamengo**	San Salvador, El Salvador
	TBD; TBD		Cesar Lemos; Flo Maravilho	Stadium: Estadio Flor Blanca

March 13, 1967 Friendly	**Alianza F.C.**	**2-0**	**Club America**	San Salvador, El Salvador
	TBD; TBD		Nil	Stadium: Estadio Flor Blanca

February 14, 1971 Friendly	**Alianza F.C.**	**1-2**	**Santos FC**	San Salvador, El Salvador
	Jose Taneses		Edu; Orlando	Stadium: Estadio Flor Blanca

March 27, 1971 Friendly	**Alianza**	**2-5**	**Cruzeiro**	San Salvador, El Salvador
	Camargo; Jose Taneses		Eduardo Lima; Tostão; João Ribeiro; Zé Carlos; Roberto Batata	Stadium: Estadio Flor Blanco

May, 1975 Friendly	**Alianza**	**3-2**	**Düsseldorfer SC 99**	San Salvador, El Salvador
	Juan Ramón Martínez; Hugo Ottensen		Busch; Laugner	Stadium: Estadio Flor Blanco

November, 1975 Friendly	**Alianza**	**1-0**	**Guatemala national football team**	San Salvador, El Salvador
	Adonay Castillo		Nil	Stadium: Estadio Flor Blanco

February 4, 1978 Friendly	**Alianza**	**1-2**	**Grasshopper**	San Salvador, El Salvador
	Mágico González 34'		Raimondo Ponte (pen.), 17'; Claudio Sulser 24'	Stadium: Estadio Flor Blanco

September 13, 1978 Friendly	**Alianza**	**0-2**	**Cruzeiro**	San Salvador, El Salvador
	Nil		Joãozinho	Stadium: Estadio Flor Blanco

May 1, 1984 Friendly	**Alianza F.C.**	**1-2**	**Bangu**	San Salvador, El Salvador
	TBD		TBD; TBD	Stadium: Estadio Flor Blanca

June 2, 1985 Friendly	**Alianza F.C.**	**0-6**	**Gremio FC**	San Salvador, El Salvador
	Nil		TBD; TBD; TBD; TBD; TBD	Stadium: Estadio Flor Blanca

January, 1992 Friendly	**Alianza F.C.**	**1-4**	**Dukla Prague**	San Salvador, El Salvador
	Julio Cesar Pereira 44'		Petr Cavos 15' 61'; Josef Kostelink 30'; Tomas Urban 55'	Stadium: Estadio Flor Blanca

March 21, 1997 Friendly	**Alianza F.C.**	**1-1**	**Tampa Bay Mutiny**	San Salvador, El Salvador
	Milton Melendez		Marco Ferruzzi	Stadium: Estadio Flor Blanca

October 8, 2010 Friendly	**Alianza F.C.**	**3-2**	**Cuba**	San Salvador, El Salvador
	Rodolfo Zelaya 47' 52'; Rene Alvarado 26'		Armando Coroneaux 16'; Alianis Urgellés 89'	Stadium: Estadio Flor Blanca
