= 1999–2000 Copa Presidente =

1999–2000 Copa El Salvador
Tournament details
- Country: El Salvador
- Teams: 36

Final positions
- Champions: Águila (1st title)
- Runners-up: Firpo

The Copa Presidente 1999–2000 is the first staging of the Copa El Salvador football tournament.

== Participants ==
Club	League	Stadium	Capacity
ADET	Primera División	TBD	N/A
Agua Zarca (Quelepa)	TBD	TBD	N/A
Aguila	Primera División	TBD	N/A
Alianza	Primera División	TBD	N/A
Ataco	TBD	TBD	N/A
Atletico Marte	Primera División	TBD	N/A
Atletico Balboa	TBD	TBD	N/A
Atlético Chaparratique	Liga de Ascenso	TBD	N/A
Chalatenango	Liga de Ascenso	TBD	N/A
Dragon	Primera División	TBD	N/A
El Vencedor	TBD	TBD	N/A
El Vencedor Junior (Zacatecoluca)	TBD	TBD	N/A
España/ Espana ADESSE	TBD	TBD	N/A
FAS	Primera División	TBD	N/A
Fuerte San Francisco	TBD	TBD	N/A
Halcon Negro (Concepción Batres)	TBD	TBD	N/A
Huracán	TBD	TBD	N/A
INCA	TBD	TBD	N/A
Juventud 72	TBD	TBD	N/A
Juventud Independiente	TBD	TBD	N/A
Juventud Metalio	Primera División	TBD	N/A
Limeno	Primera División	TBD	N/A
LA Firpo	Primera División	TBD	N/A
Mar y Plata	TBD	TBD	N/A
Metapan F.C.	Liga de Ascenso	TBD	N/A
C.D. Nahulingo (Nahulingo, Sonsonate)	TBD	TBD	N/A
Once Lobos	Liga de Ascenso	TBD	N/A
Once Municipal	Liga de Ascenso	TBD	N/A
Platense	TBD	TBD	N/A
San Luis	TBD	TBD	N/A
Santa Clara	Primera División	TBD	N/A
Sonsonate	Liga de Ascenso	TBD	N/A
Telecom F.C.	Liga de Ascenso	TBD	N/A
Topiltzin	Liga de Ascenso	TBD	N/A
Universidad de Gerardo Barrios	Liga de Ascenso	TBD	N/A
Vendaval	TBD	TBD	N/A

== Group Stage ==
Three group were divided in 3 separate division. Each group was composed of four clubs.

=== Group Occidente ===
==== Group 1 ====
Pos	Team	Pld	W	D	L	GF	GA	GD	Pts	Qualification
1	Once Lobos	6	5	0	1	0	0	0	15	Advance to knockout stage
2	FAS	6	5	0	1	0	0	0	15	Advance to knockout stage
3	Ataco	5	1	1	3	0	0	0	4	
4	Juventud Nahulingo	5	0	1	4	0	0	0	1	

Source: []
Rules for classification: Tiebreakers

January 20, 2000	Nahulingo	0–1	FAS	Estadio
	Nil		TBD

January 20, 2000	Ataco	0–2	Once Lobos	Estadio
	Nil		TBD; TBD

January 27, 2000	FAS	11–0	Ataco	Estadio
	Adolfo Menéndez; Cristian Cuellar; Helman Vladimir Monterrosa; Mario Dera; Armando Luna; TBD; TBD; TBD		Nil

January 27, 2000	Once Lobos	4–1	Juventud Nahulingo	Estadio
	TBD; TBD; TBD		TBD

February 3, 2000	FAS	0–2	Once Lobos	Estadio
	Nil		Enzo Henriquez; Juan Portillo

February 3, 2000	Ataco	2–2	Juventud Nahulingo	Estadio
	TBD; TBD		TBD; TBD

February 9, 2000	FAS	11–0	Juventud Nahulingo	Estadio
	Diego Pavoni; Emiliano Pedrozo; Erick Prado; Wilfredo Iraheta; Rafael Barrientos; Oscar Regaldo		Nil

February 9, 2000	Once Lobos	4–0	Ataco	Estadio
	TBD; TBD; TBD; TBD		Nil

February 2000	Juventud Nahulingo	(ONC won)	Once Lobos	Estadio
	TBD		TBD

February 2000	Ataco	(FAS won)	FAS	Estadio
	TBD		TBD

February 2000	FAS	(FAS Won)	Once Lobos	Estadio
	TBD		TBD

February 2000	Ataco	(Ataco Won)	Juventud Nahulingo	Estadio
	TBD		TBD

==== Group 2 ====
Pos	Team	Pld	W	D	L	GF	GA	GD	Pts	Qualification
1	Metapan F.C.	5	3	2	0	0	0	0	11	Advance to knockout stage
2	Alianza	4	2	2	0	0	0	0	8	
3	Huracan	5	1	1	3	0	0	0	4	
4	Once Municipal	5	1	0	4	0	0	0	3	

Source: []
Rules for classification: Tiebreakers

January 20, 2000	Alianza	1–1	Huracan	Estadio
	TBD		TBD

January 20, 2000	Once Municipal	2–2	Metapan F.C.	Estadio
	TBD; TBD		TBD; TBD

January 27, 2000	Alianza	3–0	Once Municipal	Estadio
	Nelson Mauricio 24'; Agnaldo de Oliveira 38'; Baltzar Miron 83'		Nil

January 27, 2000	Metapan F.C.	2–0	Huracan	Estadio
	TBD; TBD		Nil

February 3, 2000	Alianza	1–1	Metapan F.C.	Estadio
	TBD		TBD

February 3, 2000	Once Municipal	0–2	Huracan	Estadio
	Nil		TBD; TBD

February 9, 2000	Metapan F.C.	2–0	Once Municipal	Estadio
	TBD; TBD		Nil

February 10, 2000	Huracan	(ALI Won)	Alianza	Estadio
	TBD		TBD

February 2000	Huracan	(MET Won)	Metapan F.C.	Estadio
	TBD 77'		TBD 77'

February 2000	Once Municipal	v	Alianza	Estadio
	TBD 77'		TBD 77'

February 2000	Alianza	v	Metapan FC	Estadio
	TBD 77'		TBD 77'

February 2000	Once Municipal	v	Huracan	Estadio
	TBD 77'		TBD 77'

==== Group 3 ====
Pos	Team	Pld	W	D	L	GF	GA	GD	Pts	Qualification
1	ADET	6	5	1	0	0	0	0	16	Advance to knockout stage
2	Sonsonate	6	3	1	2	0	0	0	10	
3	Juventud Olimpica Metalio	6	2	1	3	0	0	0	7	
4	Juventud 72	6	0	1	5	0	0	0	1	

Source: []
Rules for classification: Tiebreakers

January 20, 2000	Juventud Metalio	0–2	Sonsonate	Estadio
	Nil		TBD; TBD

January 20, 2000	Juventud 72	2–4	ADET	Estadio
	TBD; TBD		TBD; TBD; TBD; TBD

January 27, 2000	Sonsonate	4–0	Juventud 72	Estadio
	TBD; TBD		Nil

January 27, 2000	ADET	1–0	Juventud Metalio	Estadio
	Wilbert Martinez		Nil

February 3, 2000	Sonsonate	1–2	ADET	Estadio
	TBD		Rene Cruz; Erber Serrano

February 3, 2000	Juventud 72	1–2	Juventud Olimpico Metalio	Estadio
	TBD		TBD; TBD

February 9, 2000	Sonsonate	2–1	Juventud Olimpico Metalio	Estadio
	TBD; TBD		TBD

February 9, 2000	ADET	2–0	Juventud 72	Estadio
	TBD; TBD		Nil

February 2000	Juventud Olimpica Metalio	(DRAW)	ADET	Estadio
	TBD		TBD

February 2000	Juventud 72	(DRAW)	Sonsonate	Estadio
	TBD		TBD

February 2000	Sonsonate	(ADET Won)	ADET	Estadio
	TBD		TBD

February 2000	Juventud 72	(JOM Won)	Juventud Olimpica Metalio	Estadio
	TBD		TBD

=== Group Centro ===
==== Group 1 ====
Pos	Team	Pld	W	D	L	GF	GA	GD	Pts	Qualification
1	Atletico Marte	6	3	1	2	0	0	0	10	Advance to knockout stage
2	Vendaval	6	3	1	2	0	0	0	10	
3	ADESSE Espana	6	3	0	3	0	0	0	9	
4	Platense	6	2	0	4	0	0	0	6	

Source: []
Rules for classification: Tiebreakers

January 20, 2000	Platense	1–2	Atletico Marte	Estadio
	Roberto Chicas 77'		Mario Pablo Quintanilla 77'; Jose Martinez 77'

January 20, 2000	Espana ADESSE	1–0	Vendaval	Estadio
	TBD 77'		Nil

January 27, 2000	Espana ADESSE	1–0	Atletico Marte	Estadio
	TBD		Nil

January 27, 2000	Vendaval	4–1	Platense	Estadio
	TBD; TBD; TBD; TBD		TBD

February 3, 2000	Espana ADESSE	2–1	Platense	Estadio
	TBD; TBD		TBD

February 3, 2000	Atletico Marte	1–3	Vendaval	Estadio
	Ernesto Gochez		Elenir Santamaria; Rene Alvarado; Balmore Molina

February 9, 2000	Atletico Marte	4–0	Platense	Estadio
	Óscar Mejía; Guillermo Moran; Martinez		Nil

February 9, 2000	Vendaval	3–0	Espana ADESSE	Estadio
	TBD; TBD; TBD		Nil

February 2000	Platense	(PLA won)	Vendaval	Estadio
	TBD		TBD

February 2000	Atletico Marte	(ATL Won)	Espana ADESSE	Estadio
	TBD		TBD

February 2000	Atletico Marte	2-2	Vendaval	Estadio
	Oscar Mejia 65'; Guillermo Ramirez 78'		Andrade 83' 88'

February 2000	Espana ADESSE	(PLA Won)	Platense	Estadio
	TBD		TBD

==== Group 2 ====
Pos	Team	Pld	W	D	L	GF	GA	GD	Pts	Qualification
1	LA Firpo	6	6	0	0	0	0	0	18	Advance to knockout stage
2	Chalatenango	6	4	0	2	0	0	0	12	Advance to knockout stage
3	INCA	6	1	1	4	0	0	0	4	
4	El Vencedor Junior	6	0	1	5	0	0	0	1	

Source: []
Rules for classification: Tiebreakers

January 20, 2000	Chalatenango	6–1	El Vencedor Junior	Estadio
	TBD; TBD; TBD		TBD

January 20, 2000	INCA	2–3	LA Firpo	Estadio
	Aldo Gonzalez		Rene Duran; Carlos Joya; Raul Toro

January 27, 2000	LA Firpo	2–0	Chalatenango	Estadio
	Francisco Zelaya 2'; Rene Duran		Nil

January 27, 2000	El Vencedor Junior	4–7	INCA	Estadio
	TBD; TBD		TBD; TBD; TBD; TBD

February 3, 2000	LA Firpo	2–0	El Vencedor Junior	Estadio
	TBD; TBD		Nil

February 3, 2000	Chalatenango	4–3	INCA	Estadio
	TBD; TBD; TBD		TBD; TBD

February 9, 2000	El Vencedor Junior	1–2	Chalatenango	Estadio
	TBD		TBD; TBD

February 9, 2000	LA Firpo	8–1	INCA	Estadio
	TBD; TBD; TBD; TBD; TBD		TBD

February 2000	Chalatenango	(FIR Won)	LA Firpo	Estadio
	TBD		TBD

February 2000	INCA	(Draw)	El Vencedor Junior	Estadio
	TBD		TBD

February 2000	LA Firpo	5-2	El Vencedor Junior	Estadio
	Abraham Monterrosa 9'; Celio Rodriguez 20'; Santos Cabrera 27'; Raul Toro 30'; TBD		Elias Artiga 7' 36'

February 2000	INCA	(CHA Won)	Chalatenango	Estadio
	TBD		TBD

==== Group 3 ====
Pos	Team	Pld	W	D	L	GF	GA	GD	Pts	Qualification
1	San Luis	6	4	2	0	0	0	0	14	Advance to knockout stage
2	Santa Clara	6	3	2	1	0	0	0	11	
3	Juventud Independiente	6	1	1	4	0	0	0	4	
4	Telecom F.C.	6	0	2	4	0	0	0	2	

Source: []
Rules for classification: Tiebreakers

January 20, 2000	Juventud Independiente	1–6	Santa Clara	Estadio
	TBD		TBD; TBD; TBD

January 20, 2000	San Luis	3–2	Telecom F.C.	Estadio
	TBD; TBD; TBD		TBD; TBD

January 27, 2000	Telecom F.C.	1–1	Juventud Independiente	Estadio
	Jose Umana 63'		Rodrigo Ayala 18'

January 27, 2000	Santa Clara	0–0	San Luis	Estadio
	Nil		Nil

February 3, 2000	Juventud Independiente	1–1	San Luis	Estadio
	TBD		TBD

February 3, 2000	Telecom F.C.	2–2	Santa Clara	Estadio
	TBD; TBD		TBD; TBD

February 9, 2000	Santa Clara	5–2	Juventud Independiente	Estadio
	TBD; TBD; TBD; TBD		TBD; TBD

February 9, 2000	Telecom F.C.	1–2	San Luis	Estadio
	Omar Bruno		Jaime Mejia; Jose escobar

February 2000	Juventud Independiente	(JI Won)	Telecom F.C.	Estadio
	TBD		TBD

February 2000	San Luis	(SAN LUIS WON)	Santa Clara	Estadio
	TBD		TBD

February 2000	Juventud Independiente	(SAN LUIS Won)	San Luis	Estadio
	TBD		TBD

February 2000	Telecom F.C.	(ST Clara Won)	Santa Clara	Estadio
	TBD		TBD

=== Group Oriente ===
==== Group 1 ====
Pos	Team	Pld	W	D	L	GF	GA	GD	Pts	Qualification
1	Mar y Plata	6	5	1	0	0	0	0	16	Advance to knockout stage
2	Municipal Limeño	6	3	1	2	0	0	0	10	
3	El Vencedor	2	1	1	0	0	0	0	4	
4	Universidad Gerardo Barrios	6	1	1	4	0	0	0	4	

Source: []
Rules for classification: Tiebreakers

January 20, 2000	Universidad Gerardo Barrios	0-1	Mar y Plata	Estadio
	Nil		TBD

January 20, 2000	El Vencedor	1–0	Municipal Limeño	Estadio
	TBD		Nil

January 27, 2000	Mar y Plata	2–1	El Vencedor	Estadio
	TBD; TBD		TBD

January 27, 2000	Municipal Limeño	1–0	Universidad Gerardo Barrios	Estadio
	Alexis Hernandez		Nil

February 3, 2000	Mar y Plata	2–0	Municipal Limeño	Estadio
	TBD; TBD		Nil

February 3, 2000	El Vencedor	4–4	Universidad Gerardo Barrios	Estadio
	TBD; TBD; TBD		TBD; TBD; TBD

February 9, 2000	Mar y Plata	5–1	Universidad Gerardo Barrios	Estadio
	TBD; TBD; TBD; TBD		TBD

February 9, 2000	Municipal Limeño	9–0	El Vencedor	Estadio
	TBD; TBD; TBD; TBD; TBD; TBD; TBD		Nil

February 2000	El Vencedor	(MYP won)	Mar y Plata	Estadio
	TBD		TBD

February 2000	Universidad Gerardo Barrios	(LIM Won)	Municipal Limeño	Estadio
	TBD		TBD

February 2000	Mar y Plata	(Draw)	Municipal Limeño	Estadio
	TBD		TBD

February 2000	El Vencedor	(UGB Won)	Universidad Gerardo Barrios	Estadio
	TBD		TBD

==== Group 2 ====
Pos	Team	Pld	W	D	L	GF	GA	GD	Pts	Qualification
1	Atletico Balboa	6	6	0	0	0	0	0	18	Advance to knockout stage
2	Aguila	6	4	0	2	0	0	0	12	Advance to knockout stage
3	Fuerte San Francisco	6	2	1	3	0	0	0	7	
4	Halcon Negro	6	0	1	5	0	0	0	1	

Source: []
Rules for classification: Tiebreakers

January 20, 2000	Fuerte San Francisco	2–1	Atletico Balboa	Estadio
	TBD 77'; TBD 77'		TBD 77'

January 20, 2000	Halcon Negro	1–5	Aguila	Estadio
	TBD 77'		TBD 77' 77' 77'; TBD 77'; TBD 77'

January 27, 2000	Aguila	4–0	Fuerte San Francisco	Estadio
	Ismael Arbaiza; Carlos Escalante; Roger Ventura		Nil

January 27, 2000	Atletico Balboa	6–1	Halcon Negro	Estadio
	TBD 77' 77' 77'; TBD 77' 77'; TBD 77'		TBD 77'

February 3, 2000	Aguila	0–1	Atletico Balboa	Estadio
	Nil		TBD

February 3, 2000	Fuerte San Francisco	FSF (won)	Halcon Negro	Estadio
	TBD		TBD

February 9, 2000	Atletico Balboa	1–0	Fuerte San Francisco	Estadio
	TBD		Nil

February 9, 2000	Aguila	4–1	Halcon Negro	Estadio
	TBD; TBD		TBD

February 2000	Fuerte San Francisco	(AGU Won)	Aguila	Estadio
	TBD		TBD

February 2000	Halcon Negro	(ATL Won)	Atletico Balboa	Estadio
	TBD		TBD

February 2000	Atletico Balboa	1-0	Aguila	Estadio
	TBD		Nil

February 2000	Halcon Negro	(Draw)	Fuerte San Francisco	Estadio
	TBD		TBD

==== Group 3 ====
Pos	Team	Pld	W	D	L	GF	GA	GD	Pts	Qualification
1	Dragon	6	5	1	0	0	0	0	16	Advance to knockout stage
2	Atlético Chaparratique	6	3	1	2	0	0	0	10	
3	Topiltzín	6	2	0	4	0	0	0	6	
4	Aguila Zarca	6	1	0	5	0	0	0	3	

Source: []
Rules for classification: Tiebreakers

January 20, 2000	Topiltzín	0–2	Atlético Chaparratique	Estadio
	Nil		TBD 77'; TBD 77'

January 21, 2000	Dragon	2–0	Aguila Zarca	Estadio
	TBD 77' TBD 77'		Nil

January 27, 2000	Aguila Zarca	1–2	Topiltzín	Estadio
	TBD		TBD; TBD

January 27, 2000	Dragon	1–1	Atlético Chaparratique	Estadio
	Herbert Rodriguez		TBD 77'

February 3, 2000	Aguila Zarca	3–5	Atlético Chaparratique	Estadio
	TBD; TBD		TBD; TBD; TBD

February 3, 2000	Topiltzín	0–1	Dragon	Estadio
	Nil		German Rodriguez

February 9, 2000	Aguila Zarca	0–1	Dragon	Estadio
	Nil		TBD

February 9, 2000	Atlético Chaparratique	2–0	Topiltzín	Estadio
	TBD; TBD		Nil

February 2000	Topiltzín	(TOP Won)	Aguila Zarca	Estadio
	TBD		TBD

February 2000	Atlético Chaparratique	(DRAG Won)	Dragon	Estadio
	TBD		TBD

February 2000	Agua Zarca	(AGU Won)	Atlético Chaparratique	Estadio
	TBD		TBD

February 2000	Topiltzín	(DRAG Won)	Dragon	Estadio
	TBD		TBD

== Knockout stage ==
=== Qualified teams ===
The nine group winners and the three best runners-up from the group stage qualify for the final stage.

Team	Qualification	Divisional team	Zone
Atletico Balboa	Group Winner	Liga de Ascenso	Zona Oriental
Mar y Plata	Group Winner	Divisional team	Zona Oriental
Dragon	Group Winner	Divisional team	Zona Oriental
Aguila	Best second place team	Liga Mayor	Zona Oriental
LA Firpo	Group winner	Liga Mayor	Zona Central
San Luis	Group Winner	Divisional team	Zona Central
Atletico Marte	Group Winner	Divisional team	Zona Central
Chalatenango	Best second place team	Divisional team	Zona Central
ADET	Group winner	Divisional team	Zona Occidental
FAS	Group winner	Liga Mayor	Zona Occidental
Isidro Metapan	Group winner	Divisional team	Zona Occidental
Once Lobos	best second-place winner	Divisional team	Zona Occidental

=== Round of 16 ===
==== First Leg ====
2000	Mar Y Plata	v	Aguila	Estadio
	TBD		TBD

2000	San Luis	v	LA Firpo	Estadio
	TBD		TBD

2000	Dragon	v	Atletico Balboa	Estadio
	TBD		TBD

2000	Once Lobos	v	ADET	Estadio
	TBD		TBD

2000	FAS	v	Metapan F.C.	Estadio
	TBD		TBD

2000	Chalatenango	0-1	Atletico Marte	Estadio
	Nil		TBD

=== Second Leg ===
2000	Aguila	2-1	Mar Y Plata
	TBD; TBD		TBD

Aguila won on - aggregate

2000	LA Firpo	3-1	San Luis
	TBD; TBD; TBD		TBD

LA Firpo won on - aggregate

2000	Atletico Balboa	1-0	Dragon
	TBD		Nil

Atletico Balboa won on - aggregate

2000	ADET	1-0	Once Lobos
	TBD		Nil

ADET won on - aggregate

2000	Metapan F.C.	1-1	FAS
	TBD		TBD

FAS won on - aggregate

2000	Atletico Marte	1-1	Chalatenango
	Henry Lopez		Edler Lara

Atletico Marte won on 2-1 aggregate

=== Semi-final teams ===
The three group winners and the best runners-up from the quarterfinals group stage qualify for the semi-final .

Team	Qualification	Divisional team	Zone
Atletico Balboa	Group Winner	Liga de Ascenso	Zona Oriental
Aguila	Best second place team	Liga Mayor	Zona Oriental
LA Firpo	Group winner	Liga Mayor	Zona Central
FAS	Group winner	Liga Mayor	Zona Occidental

==== First Leg ====
May 11, 2000	Atletico Balboa	1-1	LA Firpo	Estadio Marcelino Imbers, La Union
	Franklin Webster 34'		Celio Rodríguez 71'

May 11, 2000	Aguila	1-0	FAS	Estadio Juan Francisco Barraza, San Miguel
	Waldir Guerra 90'		Nil

== Final ==
11 June 2000
7:30 pm

Aguila	3–2	LA Firpo
Adrián Mahía; Paul Cominges	Report	Celio Rodríguez

Estadio Jorge "Mágico" González, San Salvador
