= Primera División de Fútbol Profesional – Apertura 1998 =

Primera División de Fútbol Profesional de El Salvador
- Season: Apertura 1998
- Champions: Alianza (7th title)
- Relegated: None
- None: None
- Top goalscorer: (El Salvador) Rodrigo Osorio (11)

The Primera División de Fútbol Profesional Apertura 1998 season (officially "Copa Pilsener Apertura 1999") is one of two short tournaments that take up the entire year to determine the champion(s) of Salvadoran football. The season started on August 28, 1998, and finished on December 27, 1998.

The season saw Alianza win its 7th league title after a 1-0 victory over C.D. Luis Ángel Firpo in the final.

== Promotion and relegation ==
Teams promoted

- Santa Clara

Teams relegated

- None

=== Notable death from middle of 1999 season and end of 1998 season ===
The following people associated with the Primera Division have died between the middle of 1998 and end of 1998.

- Oscar Armando "tito" Diaz (ex Municipal Limeno and FAS player)

== Table ==
Apertura 1998

- Firpo 33 puntos
- Alianza 32 puntos
- FAS 29 puntos
- Águila 29 puntos

== Managerial changes ==
=== Before the season ===
Team	Outgoing manager	Manner of departure	Date of vacancy	Replaced by	Date of appointment	Position in table
FAS	(Paraguay) Nelson Brizuela	Contract finished, went on to be Limeno coach	July 1998	(El Salvador) Oscar Benitez	July 1998	
Sonsonate	(El Salvador) Cristo Farfan Velasquez	Contract finished	July 1998	(El Salvador) Ricardo López Tenorio	July 1998	
Municipal Limeno	(Brazil) Antonio Carlos Vieira	Contract finished, Went on to be Aguila coach	July 1998	(Paraguay) Nelson Brizuela	July 1998	
Aguila	(Cuba) Lazaro Buchilion	Interimship ended	July 1998	(Brazil) Antonio Carlos Vieira	July 1998	
Dragon	(El Salvador) Saúl Molina	Contract finished	July 1998	(El Salvador) Moses Alberto Victor Magana	July 1998	
Alianza	(Uruguay) Jose Mario Figueroa	Contract finished	July 1998	(Uruguay) Rubén Alonso	July 1998	
Santa Clara	(El Salvador) Rubén Guevara	Contract finished	1998	(El Salvador) Eduardo Lara Moscote	1998	

=== During the season ===
Team	Outgoing manager	Manner of departure	Date of vacancy	Replaced by	Date of appointment	Position in table
Aguila	(Brazil) Antonio Carlos Vieira	Sacked	October 1998	(Federal Republic of Yugoslavia) Miloš Miljanić	October 1998	7th
ADET	(El Salvador) Victor Manuel Pacheco	Sacked	October 1998	(El Salvador) Luis Angel Leon	October 1998	9th
TBD	(Uruguay) TBD	Sacked	1998	(El Salvador) TBD	1998	10th

== Team information ==
=== Personnel and sponsoring ===
Team	Chairman	Head coach	Kitmaker	Shirt sponsor
ADET	(El Salvador)	(El Salvador) Victor Manuel Pacheco	TBD	TBD
Águila	(El Salvador)	(Brazil) Antonio Carlos Vieira	Garcis	Gigante express, Oralite
Alianza	(El Salvador) Óscar Rodríguez	(Uruguay) Ruben Alonso	lanzera	TBD
Árabe Marte	(El Salvador) Mauricio Vargas	(El Salvador) Armando Contreras Palma	TBD	Biggest, Pepsi
C.D. Dragon	(El Salvador) TBD	(El Salvador) Moses Alberto Victor Magana	TBD	TBD
FAS	(El Salvador) TBD	(El Salvador) Oscar Benitez	ABA Sport	LG
Firpo	(El Salvador) TBD	(Chile) Julio Escobar	Galaxia	Pepsi, Tapachulteca
Municipal Limeño	(El Salvador) TBD	(Paraguay) Nelson Brizuela	Aviva	El Globo
Santa Clara	(El Salvador) TBD	(El Salvador) Eduardo Lara Moscote	TBD	TBD
Sonsonate	(El Salvador) TBD	(El Salvador) Ricardo López Tenorio	TBD	TBD

== Semifinals 1st leg ==
1998

LA Firpo	1-0	Águila
Nelson Quintanilla		None

December 13, 1998

FAS	1-0	Alianza
Jaime Bladimir Cubias		None

== Semifinals 2nd leg ==
December 21, 1998

Águila	0-0	LA Firpo
None		None

Estadio Juan Francisco Barraza

LA Firpo won 1-0 on aggregare

December 20, 1998

Alianza	3-1	FAS
Alexander Merino 49'; César Elmer Acevedo 57' 65'		Ivan Nolasco 30'

Estadio Nacional de la Flor Blanca

Alianza won 3-2 on aggregare

== Final ==
December 27, 1998

Alianza	1-0	C.D. Luis Ángel Firpo
Rodrigo Osorio 86'		None

Estadio Nacional de la Flor Blanca

Alianza
GK	1	(El Salvador) Luis Guevara Mora
DF	32	(El Salvador) Óscar Navarro	Substituted off
DF	5	(El Salvador) Mario Elias Guevara
DF	22	(El Salvador) Alexander Merino
DF	4	(El Salvador) Gerardo Galán
MF	15	(El Salvador) Hector Lopez
MF	18	(El Salvador) Milton Meléndez	Substituted off
MF	14	(Uruguay) Alejandro Curbelo
MF	10	(El Salvador) Adonai Martínez
FW	9	(El Salvador) Elias Montes
FW	20	(El Salvador) Elmer Acevedo	Substituted off
Substitutes:
FW		(El Salvador) Argueta (yellow card) 54'	Substituted on
MF		(El Salvador) Rodrigo Osorio	Substituted on
MF		(Uruguay) Washington de la Cruz	Substituted on
Manager:
(Uruguay) Rubén Alonso

Firpo:
GK	(El Salvador) Misael Alfaro (red card)
DF	(El Salvador) Carlos Hernández	Substituted off
DF	(Brazil) Mauricio Do Santos
DF	(El Salvador) Leonel Cárcamo
DF	(El Salvador) Wilfredo Iraheta
MF	(El Salvador) Rene Oswaldo Duran
MF	(El Salvador) Abraham Monterrosa
MF	(Chile) Raul Toro
MF	(El Salvador) Guillermo García	Substituted off
FW	(El Salvador) Arnoldo Coreas	Substituted off
FW	(Brazil) Celio Rodriguez
Substitutes:
MF	(El Salvador) Alfredo Pérez	Substituted on
MF	(El Salvador) Carlos Castro	Substituted on
GK	(El Salvador) Carlos Rivera	Substituted on
Manager:
(Chile) Julio Escobar

Apertura 1998 champion

7th title

== Top scorers ==
Pos	Player	Team	Goals
1.	(El Salvador) Rodrigo Osorio	Alianza F.C.	11
2.	(El Salvador) Elias Montes	Alianza F.C.	8
3.	(El Salvador) Fredy Gonzales Vichez	FAS	8
4.	(El Salvador) Jose Rene Martinez	Sonsonate F.C.	8
5.	(El Salvador) Rudis Corrales	Municipal Limeno	7
6.	(Brazil) Celio Rodriguez	Firpo	6
7.	(El Salvador) Santos Cabrera	Municipal Limeno	6
8.	(El Salvador) Julo Olviera Ascue	Atletico Marte	6
9.	(El Salvador) Hector Aaron Canjura	ADET	5
10.	(Honduras) Miguel Mariano	FAS	5

== List of foreign players in the league ==
This is a list of foreign players in Apertura 1998. The following players:

1. have played at least one apertura game for the respective club.
2. have not been capped for the El Salvador national football team on any level, independently from the birthplace

ADET

- (Peru)

C.D. Águila

- (Argentina) Marcelo Buyica
- (Argentina) Claudio de Barco
- (Peru) Maximo Alafro

Alianza F.C.

- (Uruguay) Alejandro Curbelo

Arabe Marte

- (Honduras) Giovany Castillo
- (Uruguay) Julio Oliveira

(player released mid season) (player Injured mid season) Injury replacement player

Dragon

- (Argentina) Néstor Emilio Soria
- (Brazil) Delvani Quaresma
- (Cameroon) Van Sebastian
- (Honduras) Roberto Bayley

C.D. FAS

- (Brazil) Noe Dos Santos
- (Honduras) Luis Ivan Nolasco
- (Honduras) Miguel Mariano

C.D. Luis Ángel Firpo

- (Brazil) Celio Rodríguez
- (Brazil) Mauricio Dos Santos
- (Chile) Raul Toro

Municipal Limeno

- (Cameroon) Moumban Karim
- (Costa Rica) Carlos Rodriguez
- (Honduras) German Perez

Santa Clara

- (Argentina) Emiliano Pedrozo

Sonsonate

- (Brazil) Ronaldo Luis
- (Costa Rica) Luis Dominguez
