= Primera División de Fútbol Profesional – Clausura 1999 =

Primera División de Fútbol de El Salvador
- Season: Clausura 1999
- Champions: C.D. Luis Ángel Firpo (6th title)
- Relegated: Sonsonate
- Top goalscorer: (Argentina) Emiliano Pedrozo (12)
- Biggest home win: Alianza 7-0 Santa Clara (April 17, 1999)
- Biggest away win: Santa Clara 0-2 Águila (January 30, 1999)
- Highest scoring: Alianza 7-0 Santa Clara (April 17, 1999)

The Primera División de Fútbol Profesional Clausura 1999 season (officially "Copa Clima Clausura 1999") started on January 10, 1999, and finished on May 30, 1999

The season saw C.D. Luis Ángel Firpo win its 6th league title after a 5-4 penalty victory over FAS in the final after the game was ted at 1-1.

== Team information ==
=== Personnel and sponsoring ===
Team	Chairman	Head coach	Kitmaker	Shirt sponsor
ADET	(El Salvador)	(El Salvador) Luis Ángel León	Galaxia	Nil Sponsor
Águila	(El Salvador)	(Federal Republic of Yugoslavia) Milos Miljanic	Aviva	Gigante Express
Alianza	(El Salvador) Óscar Rodríguez	(Uruguay) Ruben Alonso	Lanzera	Nil Sponsor
Atlético Marte	(El Salvador) TBD	(El Salvador) Armando Contreras Palma	TBD	Biggest, Pepsi
Dragón	(El Salvador) TBD	(El Salvador) Saul Molina	TBD	SINAI
FAS	(El Salvador) TBD	(El Salvador) Óscar Emigdio Benítez	ABA Sport	LG
Firpo	(El Salvador) TBD	(Chile) Julio Escobar	Galaxia	Pepsi, Tahulteca
Municipal Limeño	(El Salvador) TBD	(Paraguay) Nelson Brizuela	Aviva	El Globo
Santa Clara	(El Salvador) TBD	(El Salvador) Pedro Interiano	TBD	BFA
Sonsonate	(El Salvador) TBD	(El Salvador) Colin Moran Cea	Galaxia	TBD

== Managerial changes ==
=== Before the season ===
Team	Outgoing manager	Manner of departure	Date of vacancy	Replaced by	Date of appointment	Position in table
Sonsonate	(El Salvador) Ricardo López Tenorio	Sacked	December 1998	(El Salvador) Colin Moran Cea	January 1999	
Dragon	(El Salvador) Moses Magana	Sacked	December 1998	(El Salvador) Saul Molina	January 1999	
Santa Clara	(El Salvador) Eduardo Lara Moscote	Sacked	December 1998	(El Salvador) Pedro Interiano	January 1999	

=== During the season ===
Team	Outgoing manager	Manner of departure	Date of vacancy	Replaced by	Date of appointment	Position in table
Municipal Limeno	(Paraguay) Nelson Brizuela	Resigned	January 1999	(El Salvador) Victor Manuel Pacheco	January 1999	
Dragon	(El Salvador) Saul Molina	Sacked	February 1999	(Honduras) Domingo Ramos Moncada (Interim)	February 1999	10th
ADET	(El Salvador) Luis Angel León	Resigned	March 1999	(Argentina) Juan Quarterone	March 1999	10th
Atletico Marte	(El Salvador) Armando Contreras Palma	Resigned	March 1999	(El Salvador) José Luis Rugamas	March 1999	3rd
Dragon	(Honduras) Domingo Ramos Moncada	Interimship finished	March, 1999	(Paraguay) Nelson Brizuela	March 1999	
Alianza	(Uruguay) Ruben Alonso	Resigned	April 1999	(El Salvador) Milton Melendez (Interim)	April 1999	
Aguila	(Federal Republic of Yugoslavia) Miloš Miljanić	Resigned	April 1999	(El Salvador) Juan Ramón Paredes	April 1999	
Alianza	(El Salvador) Milton Melendez (Interim)	moved to becoming a player	April 1999	(Chile) Hernán Carrasco	April 1999	

== League standings ==
Pos	Team	Pld	W	D	L	GF	GA	GD	Pts	Qualification or relegation
1	C.D. FAS	18	9	6	3	28	16	+12	33	Qualified to finals
2	Árabe Marte	18	8	7	3	30	23	+7	31	Qualified to finals
3	C.D. Luis Ángel Firpo	18	8	6	4	25	18	+7	30	Qualified to finals
4	Águila	18	7	6	5	18	13	+5	27	Qualified to finals
5	Limeño	18	5	8	5	27	27	0	23	
6	Alianza	18	4	10	4	24	20	+4	22	
7	Dragón	18	3	10	5	16	20	−4	19	
8	ADET	18	5	4	9	22	28	−6	19	
9	C.D. Santa Clara	18	5	4	9	21	35	−14	19	
10	Sonsonate	18	3	5	10	24	35	−11	14	Relegated to Segunda Division

== Results ==
Home \ Away	ADET	ÁGU	ALI	ATM	DRA	FAS	FIR	LIM	SAN	SON
ADET		0–1	1–0	0–1	1–1	1–1	2–1	0–1	1–2	2–1
Águila	1–0		0–0	2–2	0–0	0–0	1–2	1–0	1–2	2–0
Alianza	2–1	0–2		3–1	1–1	1–3	1–1	2–2	7–0	0–0
Árabe Marte	1–0	2–0	1–1		2–1	2–0	1–1	2–2	2–3	3–3
Dragón	2–2	1–1	2–2	0–1		0–0	1–1	0–0	2–0	2–1
C.D. FAS	3–0	1–0	2–0	3–1	0–1		1–0	3–1	2–2	3–1
Luis Ángel Firpo	4–2	1–3	1–1	0–0	1–0	1–1		2–1	4–0	2–0
Municipal Limeño	4–2	1–1	1–1	0–2	2–0	3–2	1–3		2–0	2–2
Santa Clara	1–4	0–2	0–0	2–3	3–0	1–1	0–2	2–2		0–1
Sonsonate	2–3	1–0	1–2	2–4	2–2	1–2	2–1	2–2	2–3	

Legend: Blue = home team win; Yellow = draw; Red = away team win.

== Semifinals 1st leg ==
May 15, 1999

C.D. Águila	2-2	C.D. FAS
Jorge Abrego , 12' (o.g.); Waldir Guerra 68'		Miguel "Gallo" Mariano 9' 50'

Estadio Juan Francisco Barraza

May 16, 1999

Árabe Marte	0-2	C.D. Luis Ángel Firpo
None		Celio Rodriguez 20'; Raul Toro

Estadio Nacional de la Flor Blanca

== Semifinals 2nd leg ==
May 22, 1999

C.D. FAS	1-0	C.D. Águila
Miguel “Gallo” Mariano 56'		None

Estadio Oscar Quiteño

FAS won 3-2 on aggregate

May 22, 1999

C.D. Luis Ángel Firpo	3-2	Árabe Marte
59' 78' 90'		Rene Toledo 12' 87'

Estadio Sergio Torres

LA Firpo won 5-2 on aggregate

== Final ==
May 30, 1999

C.D. FAS	1-1	C.D. Luis Ángel Firpo
Jorge Wagner 54' (pen.)		Mauricio Dos Santos 12'
Penalties
Bladimir Cubías (penalty scored); Iraheta (penalty scored); Ricardo Cuéllar (penalty scored); Jorge Wagner (penalty scored); Fredy Gonzalez (penalty missed)	4-5	Misael Alfaro (penalty scored); Castro Borja (penalty scored); Celio Rodríguez (penalty scored); Nildenson De Mello (penalty scored); Raul Toro (penalty scored)

Estadio Cuscatlán

FAS
GK	(El Salvador) Adolfo Menéndez
DF	(El Salvador) Jorge Abrego	Substituted off
DF	(El Salvador) William Osorio
DF	(El Salvador) Oscar Martinez
DF	(El Salvador) William Renderos Iraheta	Substituted off
MF	(El Salvador) Ricardo Cuéllar
MF	(Honduras) Jorge Wagner
MF	(El Salvador) Gilberto Murgas	Substituted off
MF	(El Salvador) Nelson Nerio
FW	(Honduras) Miguel Gallo Mariano
FW	(El Salvador) Marlon Medrano
Substitutes:
FW	(El Salvador) Jaime Vladimir Cubías (yellow card) 54'	Substituted on
MF	(El Salvador) Fredy González Víchez	Substituted on
MF	(Panama) Ángel Luis Rodríguez	Substituted on
Manager:
(El Salvador) Óscar Emigdio Benítez

Firpo:
GK	(El Salvador) Misael Alfaro
DF	(El Salvador) Guillermo García
DF	(El Salvador) Carlos Castro Borja
DF	(Brazil) Mauricio Dos Santos
DF	(El Salvador) Hector Canjura
DF	(El Salvador) Juan "la Chura" Gámez
MF	(El Salvador) Santos Cabrera	Substituted on
MF	(Chile) Raul Toro
MF	(El Salvador) Marcos Portillo	Substituted on
FW	(El Salvador) Jorge Alemán	Substituted on
FW	(Brazil) Celio Rodríguez
Substitutes:
DF	(El Salvador) Abraham Monterrosa	Substituted on
FW	(El Salvador) René Durán	Substituted on
FW	(Brazil) Nildeson	Substituted on
Manager:
(Chile) Julio Escobar

=== Champion ===
Clausura 1999 champion

6th title

== Top scorers ==
Pos	Player	Team	Goals
1.	(Argentina) Emiliano Pedrozo	Santa Clara	12
2.	(Honduras) Miguel Mariano	FAS	10
3.	(Brazil) Celio Rodriguez	LA Firpo	10
4.	(El Salvador) Rene Toledo	Atletico Marte	9
5.	(El Salvador) Jose Canales	Municipal Limeño	5
6.	(El Salvador) Rudis Corrales	Municipal Limeño	5
7.	(El Salvador) Armando Arechiga	Municipal Limeño	5
8.	(El Salvador) Rodrigo Osorio	Alianza	5
9.	(El Salvador) Jose Rene Martinez	Alianza	5
10.	(El Salvador) Mario Pablo Quintanilla	Atletico Marte	5

== List of foreign players in the league ==
This is a list of foreign players in Clausura 1999. The following players:

1. have played at least one apertura game for the respective club.
2. have not been capped for the El Salvador national football team on any level, independently from the birthplace

ADET

- Nil

C.D. Águila

- (Argentina) Claudio del Barco
- (Brazil) Marcio Sampaio
- (Brazil) Agnaldo de Oliveira
- (Chile) Carlos Acuna
- (Costa Rica) Michael Myers

Alianza F.C.

- (Uruguay) Alejandro Curbelo

Atletico Marte

- (Honduras) Edwin Giovanni Castillo

Dragon

- (Cameroon) Van Sebastian
- (Honduras) Roberto Bailey

C.D. FAS

- (Honduras) Miguel Mariano
- (Honduras) Jorge Wagner

C.D. Luis Ángel Firpo

- (Brazil) Celio Rodríguez
- (Brazil) Mauricio Dos Santos
- (Chile) Raul Toro
- (Brazil) Nildeson

Municipal Limeno

- (Cameroon) Moumbain Karim
- (Costa Rica) Carlos Rodriguez
- (Honduras) Israel Canales

Santa Clara

- (Argentina) Emiliano Pedrozo

Sonsonate

- Nil

Player released mid season
Player injured mid season
Injury replacement player
