= 1996–97 Primera División de El Salvador =

Primera División de El Salvador
- Season: 1996–97
- Champions: Alianza (5th Title)
- Relegated: Once Lobos

The 1996–97 Primera División de El Salvador is the 46th tournament of El Salvador's Primera División since its establishment of the National League system in 1948. The tournament began 1 September 1996 and was scheduled to end on July 27, 1997. Alianza won the two legged final over LA Firpo 3–2.

== Teams ==
Team	City	Stadium	Head coach	Captain
Aguila	San Miguel, El Salvador	Estadio San Miguel	(Federal Republic of Yugoslavia) Milovan Đorić	(El Salvador)
Alianza	San Salvador, El Salvador	Estadio Cuscatlan	(Uruguay) Juan Masnik	(El Salvador)
Atletico Marte	San Salvador, El Salvador	Estadio Cuscutlan	(Mexico) Javier Frogoso	(El Salvador)
Baygon-ADET	La Libertad	Estadio	(El Salvador) Armando Contreras Palma	(El Salvador)
Dragon	San Miguel, El Salvador	Estadio San Miguel	(Costa Rica) Didier Castro	(El Salvador)
EL Roble	Ilobasco, El Salvador	Estadio Ilobasco	(El Salvador) Conrado Miranda	(Uruguay) TBD
FAS	Santa Ana, El Salvador	Estadio de Santa Ana	(Uruguay) Saul Lorenzo Rivero	(El Salvador)
Firpo	Usulután, El Salvador	Estadio Usulutan	(Uruguay) Jorge Aude	(El Salvador)
Municipal Limeno	Santa Rosa de Lima, La Unión	Estadio de Santa Rosa Lima	(Brazil) Helio Rodriguez	(El Salvador)
Once Lobos	Chalchuapa, Santa Ana, El Salvador	Estadio El Progreso	(El Salvador) Mauricio Alvarenga	(El Salvador)

== Managerial changes ==
=== Before the season ===
Team	Outgoing manager	Manner of departure	Date of vacancy	Replaced by	Date of appointment	Position in table
TBD	(El Salvador) TBD	Sacked	1996	(El Salvador) TBD	1996	September 1995
Municipal Limeno	(El Salvador) Alfredo Ruano	Sacked	July 1996	(Brazil) Helio Rodriguez	August 1996	

=== During the season ===
Team	Outgoing manager	Manner of departure	Date of vacancy	Replaced by	Date of appointment	Position in table
C.D. Aguila	(Federal Republic of Yugoslavia) Milovan Đorić	Mutual consent, Joined the national team	December 1996	(Argentina) Mario Rey	January 1997	
C.D. Aguila	(Argentina) Mario Rey	Interimship finished	2 February 1997	(Federal Republic of Yugoslavia) Mladen Stefanovic	3 February 1997	
EL Roble	(El Salvador) Conrado Miranda	Sacked	1997	(El Salvador) Victor Manuel Pacheco	1997	
Atletico Marte	(Mexico) Javier Fragoso	Sacked	1997	(Argentina) Juan Quarterone	1997	
LA Firpo	(Uruguay) Juan Cortez	Interimship finished	1997	(Uruguay) Jorge Aude	1997	
LA Firpo	(Mexico) Mario Perez	Sacked	1997	(Uruguay) Juan Cortez	1997	
Once Lobos	(El Salvador) Mauricio Alvarenga	Sacked	1997	(El Salvador) Cesar Acevedo	1997	
Municipal Limeno	(Brazil) Helio Rodriguez	Sacked	October 1996	(Costa Rica) Manuel Solano Madrigal	November 1996	
FAS	(Uruguay) Saul Lorenzo Rivero	Mutual Consent	January 1997	(Brazil) Valdeir Vieira	15 February 1997	
Firpo	(Uruguay) Jorge Aude	Sacked	February 1997	(Chile) Julio Escobar	February 1997	
C.D. Dragon	(Costa Rica) Didier Castro	Sacked	November 1996	(El Salvador) Juan Ramón Paredes	November 1996	
C.D. Dragon	(El Salvador) Juan Ramón Paredes	Sacked	December 1996	(Honduras) Gilberto Yearwood	January 1997	
Municipal Limeno	(Costa Rica) Manuel Solano Madrigal	Resigned	February 1997	(El Salvador) Carlos Ventura	February 1997	
Municipal Limeno	(El Salvador) Carlos Ventura	Resigned	April 1997	(Colombia) Cesar Rincon	April 1997	
Municipal Limeno	(Colombia) Cesar Rincon	Resigned	May 1997	(El Salvador) Alfredo Romero (Intermship)	June 1997	

== Playoffs ==
=== Preliminary finals ===
==== First legs ====
15 June 1997
15:00 (UTC-6)

C.D. Aguila	1-1	ADET
Jorge Garay 24'		Fernando de Souza 71'

15 June 1997
15:00 (UTC-6)

FAS	3-2	Firpo
Erber Burgos 37'; Guillermo Rivera 50'; Neftali Diaz 89'		Raúl Toro Basáez 41'; Carlos Flores 93'

Referee: Neftali Recinos Alvarenga
15 June 1997
15:00 (UTC-6)

Atletico Marte	1-0	Alianza
Raul Falero 46'		Nil

Referee: Geronimo Trujillo

==== Second legs ====
19 June 1997
15:00 (UTC-6)

ADET	1-1	Aguila
TBD 59'		TBD 59'

Estadio

1-1. Aguila won 4-2 on penalty

19 June 1997
15:00 (UTC-6)

Firpo	5-2	FAS
Pércival Piggott 4' 35' 55' 85'; Israel Castro Franco		William Renderos Iraheta 33'; Tito Diaz 86'

Estadio
Referee: Rafael Rodriguez

LA Firpo won 7-5 on aggregate

19 June 1997
15:00 (UTC-6)

Alianza F.C.	2-3	Atletico Marte
Marcelo Bauza 20'; Horacio Lugo 71'		Alejandro Larrea 86' 95'; Abdul Thompson Conteh 105'

Estadio
Referee: Victorino Rodriguez

Atletico Marte won 4-2 after extra time. Both team progressed

=== Semifinals ===
==== First legs ====
22 June 1997
15:30 (UTC-6)

Alianza	2-0	Aguila
Horacio Lugo 33' 53'		Nil

Estadio
2 July 1997
15:30 (UTC-6)

LA Firpo	1-0	Atletico Marte
Israel Castro Franco 83'		Nil

Estadio Sergio Torres

==== Second legs ====
5 July 1997
15:00 (UTC-6)

Atletico Marte	2-2	LA Firpo
Mario Rodriguez 67'; Rene Toledo 69'		Fabio De Freitas 59'; Pércival Piggott 76'

Estadio

LA Firpo won 3-2 on aggregare

6 July 1997
15:00 (UTC-6)

Aguila	0-0	Alianza
Nil		Nil

Estadio

Alianza won 2-0 on aggregare

=== Third place match ===
21 July 1997
15:30 (UTC-6)

Atletico Arabe Marte	2-1	Aguila
TBD; Mario Rodriguez		TBD

Estadio Cuscatlan

=== Final ===
July 20, 1997

Firpo	0-0	Alianza
Nil	[ ]	Nil

Estadio Cuscatlán, San Salvador
July 27, 1997

Alianza	3-2	Firpo
Milton Tigana Meléndez 33' (pen.); Kin Canales 77'; Saul Salgado 88'	[ ]	Israel Castro Franco 24' 52'

Estadio Cuscatlán, San Salvador
Referee: Victorino Rodriguez

LA Firpo
GK	30	(El Salvador) Carlos Hernández
DF	21	(El Salvador) Jaime Vladimir Cubías
DF	3	(El Salvador) Leonel Cárcamo
DF	2	(El Salvador) Giovanni Trigueros
DF	4	(El Salvador) Julio Hernández	Substituted off
MF	10	(Chile) Raul Toro
MF	6	(El Salvador) Pedro Vásquez
MF	14	(El Salvador) Agustin Gamez
MF	31	(Brazil) Fabio de Freitas
FW	9	(El Salvador) Israel Castro	Substituted off
FW	26	(Panama) Pércival Piggott
Substitutes:
MF		(El Salvador) TBD	Substituted on
MF		(El Salvador) TBD	Substituted on
Manager:
(Chile) Julio Escobar

Alianza:
GK	18	(Costa Rica) Pedro Cubillo
DF	6	(Uruguay) Washington de la Cruz
DF	3	(El Salvador) Nelson Rojas
DF	4	(El Salvador) Mario Guevara
MF		(El Salvador) William Chachagua
MF	17	(El Salvador) Baltazar Mirón
MF	13	(El Salvador) Milton Meléndez
MF	23	(Uruguay) Alejandro Curbelo
MF	14	(El Salvador) Elias Montes
FW	9	(Argentina) Horacio Lugo
FW	11	(Argentina) Marcelo Bauza
Substitutes:
MF		(El Salvador) TBD	(substituted on) 29' (yellow card) 52'
MF		(El Salvador) TBD	(substituted on) 72'
Manager:
(Uruguay) Juan Masnik

Alianza FC won 3-2 on Aggregate.

== Top scorers ==
Pos	Player	Team	Goals
1.	(Uruguay) Jorge Garay	Aguila	21
2	(Honduras) Ivan Nolasco	El Roble de Ilobasco	20
3.	(Uruguay) Carlos Villareal	FAS	19
4.	(Uruguay) Alejandro Larrea	Atletico Marte	17
5.	(El Salvador) Waldir Guerra	Aguila	16
6.	(Argentina) Juan Manuel Villarreal	Once Lobos	15
7.	(Sierra Leone) Abdul Thompson Conteh	Atletico Marte	14
8.	(El Salvador) Oscar Diaz	FAS	13
9.	(El Salvador) (Brazil) Israel Castro Franco	Luis Angel Firpo	13
10.	(El Salvador) Rodrigo Osorio	Alianza FC	12

== List of foreign players in the league ==
This is a list of foreign players in 1996-1997. The following players:

1. have played at least one game for the respective club.
2. have not been capped for the El Salvador national football team on any level, independently from the birthplace

C.D. Águila

- (Brazil) Rogerio Martins Rocha
- (Federal Republic of Yugoslavia) Vladimir Avramovic
- (Federal Republic of Yugoslavia) Dragan Kovacevic
- (Uruguay) Jorge Garay
- (Uruguay) Jorge Villar

Alianza F.C.

- (Argentina) Leonardo Gaston Fioroto
- (Argentina) Horacio Lugo
- (Argentina) Marcelo Bauza
- (Costa Rica) Pedro Cubillo
- (Uruguay) Washington de la Cruz

Atletico Marte

- (Mexico) Alex Lopez
- (Sierra Leone) Abdul Thompson Conteh
- (Uruguay) Alejandro Larrea
- (Uruguay) Raul Falero

Baygon-ADET

- (Brazil) Fernando de Moura
- (Honduras) Jorge Martinez Ogaldes

Dragon

- (Brazil) M.Ferreira
- (Honduras) Dennis Antonio Piedy
- (Uruguay) P.Guidi
- (Uruguay) Peter Mendez

(player released mid season) (player Injured mid season) Injury replacement player

El Roble

- (Honduras) Ivan Nolasco

C.D. FAS

- (Argentina) Daniel Boscoso
- (Costa Rica) Onix Vargas
- (Peru) Agustin Castillo
- (Uruguay) Carlos Edgar Villarreal
- (Uruguay) Jorge Mocecchi

C.D. Luis Ángel Firpo

- (Brazil) Fabio de Freitas
- (Brazil) Israel Castro Franco
- (Chile) Raul Toro
- (Honduras) Richardson Smith
- (Panama) Percibal Piggott

Limeno

- (Honduras) German Rodriguez
- (Panama) Radames Avila
- (Panama) Franklin Delgado

Once Lobos

- (Argentina) Enriquez
- (Argentina) Juan Manuel Villarreal
- (Argentina) Marcelo Bruno
- (Argentina) Emiliano Pedrozo
