= Primera División de Fútbol Profesional Clausura 2004 =

Primera División de Fútbol de El Salvador
- Champions: Alianza F.C. ( title)
- Relegated: Arcense & Chalatenango
- Top goalscorer: TBD (12)

The Primera División de Fútbol Profesional Clausura 2004 season (officially "Torneo Clausura 2004") started on January 24, 2004.

The season was composed of the following clubs:

- C.D. FAS
- Municipal Limeño
- San Salvador F.C.
- C.D. Águila
- C.D. Luis Ángel Firpo
- A.D. Isidro Metapán
- C.D. Atlético Balboa
- Alianza F.C.
- Arcense
- Chalatenango

== Team information ==
=== Personnel and sponsoring ===
| Team | Chairman | Head coach | Kitmaker | Shirt sponsor |
|---|---|---|---|---|
| Águila | (El Salvador) | (Argentina) Hugo Coria | TBD | TBD |
| Alianza | (El Salvador) | (Uruguay) Juan Mujica | TBD | TBD |
| Atletico Balboa | (El Salvador) Noel Benítez | (El Salvador) Oscar Emigdio Benitez | TBD | TBD |
| C.D. Arcense | (El Salvador) TBD | (Argentina) Raul Donsati | TBD | TBD |
| Chalatenango | (El Salvador) TBD | (Argentina) Raul Hector Cocherari | TBD | TBD |
| FAS | (El Salvador) Reynaldo Valle | (Peru) Agustín Castillo | TBD | TBD |
| Firpo | (El Salvador) TBD | (Uruguay) Gustavo de Simone | TBD | TBD |
| Isidro Metapan | (El Salvador) José Gumercindo Landaverde | (Uruguay) Saul Lorenzo Rivero | TBD | TBD |
| Municipal Limeno | (El Salvador) Gumercindo Ventura | (Argentina) Jorge Alberto Garcia | Galaxia | LG |
| San Salvador F.C. | (El Salvador) Marco Flores | (Uruguay) Daniel Uberti | TBD | TBD |

== Managerial changes ==
=== Before the season ===
| Team | Outgoing manager | Manner of departure | Date of vacancy | Replaced by | Date of appointment | Position in table |
|---|---|---|---|---|---|---|
| Alianza F.C. | (Argentina) Marcelo Javier Zuleta | Sacked | December 2003 | (Uruguay) Juan Mujica | 2004 | |
| Atletico Balboa | (El Salvador) Jesus Fuentes | TBD | December 2003 | (El Salvador) Oscar Emigdio Benitez | December 2003 | |
| San Salvador F.C. | (Uruguay) Ruben Alonso | TBD | December 2003 | (Uruguay) Daniel Uberti | 2004 | |
| C.D. Chalatenango | (Argentina) Juan Quarterone | TBD | December 2003 | (Argentina) Raul Hector Cocherari | December 2003 | |
| Isidro Metapan | (Paraguay) Nelson Brizuela | TBD | December 2003 | (Uruguay) Saul Lorenzo Rivero | Jan 2004 | |

=== During the season ===
| Team | Outgoing manager | Manner of departure | Date of vacancy | Replaced by | Date of appointment | Position in table |
|---|---|---|---|---|---|---|
| San Salvador F.C. | (Uruguay) Daniel Urberti | TBD | Feb 2004 | (Serbia) Milos Mijanic | Feb 2004 | |
| C.D. Arcense | (Argentina) Raul Donsati | TBD | April 2004 | (Argentina) Andres Novara | April 2004 | |
| San Salvador F.C. | (Serbia) Milos Mijanic | TBD | April 2004 | (Uruguay) Ruben Alonso | May 2004 | |

== Clausura 2004 standings ==
| Pos | Team | Pld | W | D | L | GF | GA | GD | Pts | Qualification or relegation |
|---|---|---|---|---|---|---|---|---|---|---|
| 1 | C.D. FAS | 18 | 9 | 8 | 1 | 34 | 16 | +18 | 35 | |
| 2 | C.D. Luis Ángel Firpo | 18 | 9 | 4 | 5 | 27 | 19 | +8 | 31 | |
| 3 | Alianza F.C. | 18 | 8 | 5 | 5 | 31 | 21 | +10 | 29 | |
| 4 | C.D. Águila | 18 | 8 | 4 | 6 | 27 | 30 | −3 | 28 | |
| 5 | C.D. Atlético Balboa | 18 | 8 | 2 | 8 | 32 | 27 | +5 | 26 | |
| 6 | A.D. Isidro Metapán | 18 | 6 | 6 | 6 | 20 | 25 | −5 | 24 | |
| 7 | C.D. Municipal Limeño | 18 | 5 | 6 | 7 | 17 | 19 | −2 | 21 | |
| 8 | Chalatenango (Note: Chalatenango and San Salvador play off against 9th place, the losers play the second level runners-up in a promotion/relegation playoff) | 18 | 4 | 9 | 5 | 20 | 23 | −3 | 21 | Relegated to Segunda División de Fútbol Salvadoreño |
| 9 | Arcense | 18 | 4 | 6 | 8 | 16 | 23 | −7 | 18 | Relegated to Segunda División de Fútbol Salvadoreño |
| 10 | San Salvador F.C. | 18 | 2 | 4 | 12 | 18 | 39 | −21 | 10 | |

== Play off ==
May 22, 2004

| Chalatenango | 2-3 | San Salvador F.C. |

== Promotion/relegation playoff 1st leg ==
June 1, 2004

| Once Lobos | 2-2 | Chalatenango |

== Promotion/relegation playoff 2nd leg ==
June 5, 2004

| Chalatenango | 0-1 | Once Lobos |

Chalatenango relegated and Once Lobos Promoted

== Semifinals 1st leg ==
May 23, 2004

| C.D. Águila | 2-3 | C.D. FAS |

May 23, 2004

| Alianza F.C. | 1-1 | C.D. Luis Ángel Firpo |

== Semifinals 2nd leg ==
May 30, 2004

| C.D. FAS | 1-0 | C.D. Águila |

May 30, 2004

| C.D. Luis Ángel Firpo | 2-3 | Alianza F.C. |

== Final ==
June 6, 2004

| C.D. FAS | 1–1 pen (2–3) | Alianza F.C. |
|---|---|---|
| Víctor Velásquez 110' | | Luis Espíndola 115' |

Estadio Jorge "El Mágico" González

FAS
| GK | (El Salvador) Luís Castro |
| DF | (El Salvador) Víctor Velásquez (yellow card) (goal) 110' |
| DF | (El Salvador) Marvin Gonzalez |
| DF | (Brazil) Marcelo Messias |
| DF | (El Salvador) William Osorio | (substituted off) 66' |
| MF | (El Salvador) Gilberto Murgas |
| MF | (El Salvador) Alfredo Pacheco | (substituted off) 53' |
| MF | (Colombia) Víctor Mafla (yellow card) | (substituted off) 102' |
| MF | (El Salvador) Ernesto Góchez |
| FW | (Argentina) Alejandro de la Cruz Bentos |
| FW | (Honduras) Williams Reyes |
Substitutes:
| FW | (El Salvador) Cristian Álvarez | (substituted on) 66' |
| MF | (El Salvador) Emerson Umaña | (substituted on) 53' |
| MF | (El Salvador) Ramón Flores | (substituted on) 102' |
Manager:
(Peru) Agustín Castillo

Alianza:
| GK | (El Salvador) Miguel Montes |
| DF | (El Salvador) Walter Alvarez (red card) |
| DF | (El Salvador) Mario Elias Guevara |
| DF | (Uruguay) Luis Espíndola 115' |
| DF | (El Salvador) Bladimir Cubías | (substituted off) 23' |
| MF | (Uruguay) Alejandro Curbelo |
| MF | (El Salvador) Rafael Barrientos |
| MF | (El Salvador) Mario Quintanilla (yellow card) | (substituted off) 46' |
| MF | (El Salvador) Nelson Nerio |
| FW | (Colombia) Martín García |
| FW | (Uruguay) Ariel Fontela (yellow card) 73' | (substituted off) 70' |
Substitutes:
| DF | (El Salvador) Danilo Martínez | (substituted on) 23' |
| FW | (El Salvador) Óscar Navarro | (substituted on) 46' |
| FW | (El Salvador) Alex Erazo | (substituted on) 70' |
Manager:
(Uruguay) Juan Martín Mujica

Clasura 2004 champions

9th title

== List of foreign players in the league ==
This is a list of foreign players in Clausura 2004. The following players:

1. have played at least one apertura game for the respective club.
2. have not been capped for the El Salvador national football team on any level, independently from the birthplace

C.D. Águila

- (Uruguay) Dario Larrosa
- (Brazil) Anderson da Silva
- (Uruguay) Paulo Medina
- (Uruguay) Luis Almada

Alianza F.C.

- (Colombia) Martin Garcia
- (Uruguay) Ariel Fontela
- (Uruguay) Yari Silvera
- (Uruguay) Alejandro Curbelo
- (Uruguay) Luis Fernando Espindola

Atletico Balboa

- (Colombia) Juan Carlos Mosquera
- (Honduras) Ernesto Noel Aquino
- (Colombia) Carlos Asprilla
- (Colombia) Victor Balanta

Arcense

- (Argentina) Martín Uranga
- (Honduras) Jorge Wagner
- (Argentina) Juan La Vaca
- (Colombia) John Polo
- (Argentina) Luciano Quinteros

Chalatenango

- (Panama) Nicolás Muñoz
- (Argentina) Diego Alvarez
- (Colombia) Libardo Carvajal
- (Costa Rica) José Luis Gónzález
- (Costa Rica) William Vargas
- (Colombia) Alexander Obregon

(player released mid season) (player Injured mid season) Injury replacement player

C.D. FAS

- (Colombia) Victor Hugo Mafla
- (Honduras) Williams Reyes
- (Argentina) Alejandro Bentos
- (Brazil) Marcelo Messias
- (Peru) Antonio Serrano

C.D. Luis Ángel Firpo

- (Uruguay) Manuel Abreu
- (Dominican Republic) Óscar Abreu Mejía
- (Brazil) Ricardo Machado de Oliveira
- (Uruguay) Alejandro Cuneo
- (Brazil) Mauro Caju
- (Brazil) Paulo César Rodríguez
- (Uruguay) Jose Mauro Laurindo

A.D. Isidro Metapán

- (Uruguay) Juan Carlos Reyes
- (Uruguay) Alcides Bandera
- (Argentina) Andrés Bazzano
- (Uruguay) Juan Bicca
- (Colombia) Wilson Sanchez

Municipal Limeno

- (Argentina) Gabriel Kinjo
- (Colombia) Nito Gonzales
- (Honduras) Eugenio Valerio
- (Brazil) Marcelo Marquez dos Santos
- (Colombia) Jorge Sandoval
- (Argentina) Carlos Escalante

San Salvador F.C.

- (Honduras) Franklin Webster
- (Uruguay) Oscar Vallejo
- (Colombia) Alexander Obregón
- (Colombia) Henry Sevillano
- (Argentina) Rodrigo Lagos
