= 1992–93 Primera División de Fútbol Profesional =

Primera División de Fútbol Profesional
- Season: 1992–93
- Champions: LA Firpo (4th Title)
- Relegated: Fuerte San Francisco

The 1992–93 Primera División de Fútbol Profesional season is the 42nd tournament of El Salvador's Primera División since its establishment of the National League system in 1948. The tournament was scheduled to end on June 27, 1993. LA Firpo, the best regular season team, won the championship match against Alianza.

== Teams ==
Team	City	Stadium	Head coach	Captain
ADET	TBD	Estadio	(El Salvador) TBD	(El Salvador)
Atletico Marte	TBD	Estadio Cuscutlan	(El Salvador)	(El Salvador) Carlos Castro Borja
Aguila	TBD	Estadio	(El Salvador) TBD	(Argentina) Hugo Coria
Alianza	TBD	Estadio	(Brazil) Helio Rodriguez	(El Salvador)
Apaneca	TBD	Estadio	(El Salvador) Cesar Acevedo	(El Salvador)
Cojutepeque	TBD	Estadio	(El Salvador) Saul Molina	(El Salvador)
FAS	TBD	Estadio	(Uruguay) Juan Masnik	(El Salvador)
Firpo	TBD	Estadio	(North Macedonia) Kiril Dojčinovski	(El Salvador)
Fuerte San Francisco	TBD	Estadio	(El Salvador) TBD	(El Salvador)
Tiburones	TBD	Estadio	(El Salvador) TBD	(El Salvador)

== Managerial changes ==
=== Before the season ===
Team	Outgoing manager	Manner of departure	Date of vacancy	Replaced by	Date of appointment	Position in table
LA Firpo	(North Macedonia) Kiril Dojčinovski	Mutual Consent	1992	(Chile) Hernán Carrasco	1992	

=== During the season ===
Team	Outgoing manager	Manner of departure	Date of vacancy	Replaced by	Date of appointment	Position in table
LA Firpo	(Chile) Hernán Carrasco	Sacked	1993	(North Macedonia) Kiril Dojčinovski	1993	
TBD	(El Salvador) TBD	Sacked	1989	(El Salvador)	1990	

== Final ==
June 27, 1993

LA Firpo	2–1	Alianza
Raúl Díaz Arce 50'; Celio Rodriguez 70'	[ ]	Marcelo Bauza 25'

Estadio Cuscatlán, San Salvador

Luis Angel Firpo:
GK	TBD	(El Salvador) Carlos Rivera
DF	TBD	(El Salvador) Juan Garcia Gamez
DF	TBD	(Uruguay) Luis Sosa
DF	TBD	(El Salvador) Giovanni Trigueros
DF	TBD	(El Salvador) Miguel Estrada
MF	TBD	(El Salvador) Pedro Vasquez
MF	TBD	(El Salvador) Fernando Lazo
MF	TBD	(El Salvador) Jose Maria Batres
MF	TBD	(Chile) Raul Toro
FW	TBD	(El Salvador) Raul Diaz Arce
FW	TBD	(Brazil) Celio Rodriguez
Substitutes:
DF	TBD	(El Salvador) Leonel Carcamo
FW	TBD	(Brazil) Fernando De Moura
Manager:
(North Macedonia) Kiril Dojčinovski

Alianza:
GK	TBD	(El Salvador) Misael Alfaro
DF	TBD	(Uruguay) Adrian de La Cruz
DF	TBD	(El Salvador) Nelson Rojas
DF	TBD	(El Salvador) Mario Mayen Meza
DF	TBD	(El Salvador) William Enrique Chachagua
MF	TBD	(El Salvador) Héctor López
MF	TBD	(Argentina) Hugo Neira
MF	TBD	(El Salvador) Julio Amilcar Palacios
FW	TBD	(El Salvador) Joaquín Canales
FW	TBD	(Argentina) Marcelo Bauza
FW	TBD	(Brazil) Marcos Aparecido
Substitutes:
DF	TBD	(Uruguay) TBD
Manager:
(Brazil) Helio Rodriguez

== Records ==
=== Team records ===
- Best home records: TBD (00 points out of 33 points)
- Worst home records: TBD (0 points out of 33 points)
- Best away records : TBD (00 points out of 33 points)
- Worst away records : TBD (0 points out of 33 points)
- Most goals scored: TBD (79 goals)
- Fewest goals scored: TBD (33 goals)
- Fewest goals conceded : TBD (32 goals)
- Most goals conceded : Cojutepeque (111 goals)

=== Scoring ===
- Most goals in a match: 11 goals
  - TBD 11–0 TBD (Month Day, Year)
- Most goals by one team in a match: 11 goals
  - TBD 11–0 TBD (Month Day, Year)
- Most goals in one half by one team: 7 goals
  - TBD 7-0 (11–0) TBD ( half, April 30, 1995)
- Most goals by one player in a single match: 4 goals
  - (Brazil) Rodinei Martins for Atletico Marte against Aguila (December 13, 1992)
- Players that scored a hat-trick':
  - (Brazil) Rodinei Martins for Atletico Marte against Aguila (December 13, 1992)

== Top scorers ==
Pos	Player	Team	Goals
1.	(Brazil) Rodinei Martins	Atletico Marte	24
2	(El Salvador) TBD	TBD	TBD
3.	(El Salvador) TBD	TBD	TBD
4.	(El Salvador) TBD	TBD	TBD
5.	(El Salvador) TBD	TBD	TBD
6.	(El Salvador) TBD	TBD	TBD
7.	(El Salvador) TBD	TBD	TBD
8.	(El Salvador) TBD	TBD	TBD
9.	(El Salvador) TBD	TBD	TBD
10.	(El Salvador) TBD	TBD	TBD

== List of foreign players in the league ==
This is a list of foreign players in 1992-1993. The following players:

1. have played at least one game for the respective club.
2. have not been capped for the El Salvador national football team on any level, independently from the birthplace

ADET

- (Brazil) Eraldo Correia
- (Honduras) Julio César Arzú
- (Uruguay) Ruben Alonso

C.D. Águila

- (Argentina) Hugo Coria
- (Brazil) Salvador Filho
- (Chile) Juan Carlos Carreño
- (Uruguay) Dario Lopez
- (Uruguay) Daniel Malceñido

Alianza F.C.

- (Argentina) Marcelo Bauza
- (Argentina) Hugo Damian Neira

Atletico Marte

- (Argentina) Oscar Tedini
- (Brazil) Alvery Rodrígues Dos Santos
- (Brazil) Rodinei Martins
- (Peru) Agustin Castillo

Apaneca

- (Honduras)

(player released mid season) (player Injured mid season) Injury replacement player

Cojutepeque

- (Honduras)

C.D. FAS

- (Brazil) Carlos Seixa
- (Uruguay) Ruben Baeque
- (Uruguay) Luis Enrique Guelmo
- (Uruguay) Mauricio Silvera

C.D. Luis Ángel Firpo

- (Brazil) Celio Rodriguez
- (Brazil) Fernando de Moura
- (Brazil) Nildeson de Melo

Fuerte San Francisco

- (Argentina)

Tiburones

- (Honduras) Javier Flores
- (Uruguay) Ruben Alonso
- (Uruguay) Gabriel Parodi
