= Héctor Jara =

Chilean footballer and manager (born 1950)

Personal information
- Full name: Héctor Hernán Jara Medina
- Date of birth: 1 January 1950 (age 76)
- Place of birth: Chile

Senior career*
Years	Team	Apps	(Gls)
- Deportes Concepción
- Huachipato

Managerial career
- 1981: Ñublense
- 1991: Lozapenco
- 1994: Santiago Morning
- 2007: Lota Schwager
- 2012: Fernández Vial
- 2014: Sonsonate
- 2015: Sonsonate
- 2016: Leones de Occidente
- 2016: Deportivo Chiquimula
- 2017–2018: Vendaval
- * Club domestic league appearances and goals

Héctor Hernán Jara Medina is a Chilean former football player and manager.

== Coaching career ==
=== Sonsonate FC ===
In March 2014, Jara signed as new coach of Sonsonate of El Salvador, replacing Wilson Sánchez. In June 2014, Jara was replaced by Cesar Acevedo.

=== Return to Sonsonate FC ===
In August 2015, Jara signed again as coach of Sonsonate, replacing Ennion Mendoza and Mario Elias Guevara. In October 2015, Jara was replaced by Edwin Portillo, after a strong discussion with the president of Sonsonate FC, Pedro Contreras.

=== Vendaval ===
In August 2017, he signed as new coach of Vendaval.
