= Jorge Sánchez (footballer, born 1979) =

Salvadoran footballer

Personal information
- Full name: Jorge Elenilson Sánchez Garay
- Date of birth: March 13, 1979 (age 47)
- Place of birth: Usulután, El Salvador
- Height: 1.70 m (5 ft 7 in)
- Position: Defender

Team information
- Current team: Luis Ángel Firpo
- Number: 14

Senior career*
Years	Team	Apps	(Gls)
1997–1999	Luis Ángel Firpo (Reserves)		
1999–2000	Mar y Plata		
2001	Atlético Chaparrastique		
2001–2003	Liberal I.R.		
2003–2012	Luis Ángel Firpo		

International career^{‡}
2005	El Salvador	1	(0)
- * Club domestic league appearances and goals ‡ National team caps and goals as of 18 February 2012

Jorge Elenilson Sánchez Garay (born March 13, 1979, in El Salvador) is a Salvadoran football player who currently plays as a defender for Luis Ángel Firpo in the Primera División de Fútbol de El Salvador.

== Club career ==
Sánchez started his career with the Luis Ángel Firpo Reserve team in his hometown and had spells in the Salvadoran second division with Mar y Plata, Atlético Chaparrastique and Liberal I.R. before setting off on a lengthy career with Firpo where he has become club captain.

== International career ==
Sánchez made his debut for El Salvador in an August 2005 friendly match against Paraguay and he has not played another international game since.
