= Rafael Barrientos =

Rafael Barrientos may refer to:

- Rafael Barrientos (musician) (1919–2008), Salvadoran musician and composer
- Rafael Barrientos (footballer) (born 1979), Salvadoran footballer
