= Rubén da Silva =

Uruguayan footballer (born 1968)

Personal information
- Full name: Rubén Fernando da Silva Echeverrito
- Date of birth: 11 April 1968 (age 58)
- Place of birth: Montevideo, Uruguay
- Height: 1.82 m (6 ft 0 in)
- Position: Striker

Senior career*
Years	Team	Apps	(Gls)
1986–1989	Danubio		
1989–1991	River Plate	35	(14)
1991–1992	Logroñés	16	(3)
1992–1993	River Plate	34	(17)
1993–1995	Boca Juniors	49	(11)
1995–1998	Rosario Central	80	(38)
1998–2000	UAG Tecos	59	(14)
2000–2001	Nacional	24	(7)
2001–2004	Danubio	66	(13)

International career
1988–2000	Uruguay	22	(3)

Managerial career
- 2012: El Tanque Sisley
- 2017–2018: Santa Tecla FC (youth)
- 2018: Santa Tecla FC
- 2018: CD Dragón
- 2019–2020: Sonsonate FC
- 2022: Once Deportivo
- 2023: Platense
Medal record
Representing Uruguay
Copa América
Winner	1995 Uruguay
Runner-up	1989 Brazil
- * Club domestic league appearances and goals

Rubén Fernando da Silva Echeverrito (born 11 April 1968) is a retired Uruguayan footballer who played as a striker. He played for a number of clubs in Uruguay, Argentina, Spain, Italy and Mexico. He also played for the Uruguay national team.

Da Silva started his career in 1986 with Danubio in the Primera División Uruguaya. In 1988, he helped them win the league and was top scorer in the league with 23 goals. In 1989, he moved to Argentine giants River Plate, where he was part of the team that won the Primera Division in 1988–1989. Da Silva then moved to Italy in 1991, where he played for U.S. Cremonese before returning to River Plate in 1992, where he was topscorer in the Clausura 1993, prompting his move to CD Logroñés in Spain.

In 1994 Da Silva returned to Argentina to play for River Plate's biggest rivals, Boca Juniors. In 1995 Da Silva left Boca to join Rosario Central, where he won the Copa Conmebol (currently known as Copa Sudamericana) in 1995, and was again topscorer of Argentina, with 15 goals in the Apertura 1997 tournament. Da Silva had a two-year spell with UAG Tecos in Mexico before returning home to Uruguay with Club Nacional de Football in 2000. Nacional won the Primera Division in 2000, then Da Silva returned to his first club, Danubio, where he retired in 2004 after helping the club to claim the Primera division title.

== Titles ==
Season	Club	Title
1988	Danubio	Primera División Uruguaya
1989–1990	River Plate	Primera División Argentina
1995	Uruguay	Copa América
1995	Rosario Central	Copa Conmebol
2000	Club Nacional de Football	Primera División Uruguaya
2004	Danubio	Primera División Uruguaya

== Awards ==
Season	Club	Award
1988	Danubio	Primera División Uruguaya top scorer: 23 goals
Clausura 1993	River Plate	Primera División Argentina top scorer: 13 goals
1995	Rosario Central	Copa Conmebol top scorer: 4 goals
Apertura 1997	Rosario Central	Primera División Argentina top scorer: 15 goals
