= Adolfo Menéndez =

Salvadoran footballer (born 1970)

Personal information
- Full name: Adolfo Humberto Menéndez Cortez
- Date of birth: 13 April 1970 (age 56)
- Place of birth: Santa Ana, El Salvador
- Height: 1.88 m (6 ft 2 in)
- Position: Goalkeeper

Youth career
- 1986–1987: San Luis
- 1988: San Rafael

Senior career*
Years	Team	Apps	(Gls)
1989–1991	Isidro Metapán		
1991–2000	FAS		
2000–2005	Isidro Metapán	113	(0)
2005–2006	Once Municipal	54	(0)
2007–2008	FAS	14	(0)

International career
1994–1999	El Salvador	4	(0)

Managerial career
- 2012–2015: A.D. Isidro Metapán (goalkeeper coach)
- 2016–2019: C.D. FAS (goalkeeper coach / assistant)
- 2019: Cobán Imperial (assistant)
- 2025-Present: Inter FA (goalkeeper coach)
- * Club domestic league appearances and goals

Adolfo Humberto Menéndez Cortéz (born 13 April 1970 in Santa Ana, El Salvador) is a retired Salvadoran footballer who played as a goalkeeper.

== Club career ==
Nicknamed Fito, Menéndez came through at San Luis and San Rafael and made his debut in Primera División de Fútbol de El Salvador with Isidro Metapán in 1989, before joining FAS for a lengthy and successful spell during the 1990s. He won three league titles with FAS. In 2000, he returned to Isidro Metapán only to return to FAS, after a stint at Once Municipal, with whom he won the Apertura 2006.

== International career ==
Menéndez made his debut for El Salvador in a June 1994 friendly match against Brazil and has earned a total of 4 caps, scoring no goals. He has represented his country at the 1995 UNCAF Nations Cup

His final international match was an October 1999 CONCACAF Gold Cup qualification match against Cuba.

== Retirement ==
After retiring as a player, Menéndez was shortly caretaker-manager of FAS and currently works as goalkeeping coach at the club. In June 2011, Ménendez was one of the first to be heard in a legal case about possible selling of matches in 2010.

== Honours ==
- Primera División de Fútbol de El Salvador: 4

1994, 1995, 1996, Apertura 2006
