= Juventud Cara Sucia F.C. =

A.D. Juventud Cara Sucia
- Full name: Asociacion Deportiva Juventud Cara Sucia
- Founded: 1972
- Ground: Cancha INDES, Barrio El Calvario, Cara Sucia
- Capacity: 1000
- Chairman: Rafael Calderón
- Manager: Carlos Alvarenga
- League: Tercera Division de Fútbol Salvadoreño
- Clausura 2019: Grupo Centro Occidente A, 3rd
Home colours

Asociacion Deportiva Juventud Cara Sucia is a Salvadoran professional football club based in Cara Sucia, Ahuachapán, El Salvador.

== History ==
The club was founded on 19 October 1972 as Juventud 72. It changed to its current name in 2012.

== Notable coaches ==
- (Uruguay) Carlos Reyes (2001)
- (El Salvador) Ernesto Lemus
- (El Salvador) Carlos Carrero (July 2017 – December 2017)
- (El Salvador) Nelson Boteo (December 2017– February 2018)
- (El Salvador) Ronald Rojas
- (El Salvador) Salvador Morataya
- (El Salvador) Carlos Alvarenga (August 2020 - December 2020)
