= Gabriel Kinjo =

Argentine footballer (born 1991)

Personal information
- Full name: Gabriel Alejandro Akio Kinjo
- Date of birth: December 12, 1973 (age 52)
- Place of birth: Argentina
- Position: Striker

Senior career*
Years	Team	Apps	(Gls)
1994–1995	Sportivo Italiano	16	(0)
1996	Club Leandro N. Alem	6	(0)
1997	Club Atlético Colegiales	14	(2)
1997–1998	All Boys		
1998–1999	Club Atlético Colegiales	36	(14)
1999–2000	Club Atlético Nueva Chicago	11	(1)
2001–2002	CD Técnico Universitario		
2003	CD Saquisilí		
2004	CD Municipal Limeño		
2004	AD Municipal Liberia		
2005	Puntarenas FC		
- * Club domestic league appearances and goals

Gabriel Alejandro Akio Kinjo (born 12 December 1973) is a Japanese footballer who plays as a striker for Puntarenas FC.

== Early life ==
Kinjo was born to Takeichi Kinjo and Takami Kinjo.

== Career ==
Kinjo started his career with Argentine side Sportivo Italiano.

== Style of play ==
Kinjo mainly operated as a striker.

== Personal life ==
Kinjo is of Japanese descent.
