= Jorge Aude =

Uruguayan footballer and manager

Personal information
- Full name: Jorge Aude Almeida
- Date of birth: 22 September 1946 (age 80)
- Place of birth: Uruguay

Managerial career
- Years: Team
- 1989: C.A. Progreso (assistant)
- 1991–1992: El Salvador
- 1996–1997: Comunicaciones
- 1997: LA Firpo
- 1998: Cruz Azul Hidalgo
- 1998–1999: Venados de Yucatán
- 1999–2000: Huracán Buceo
- 2001: La Piedad
- 2004: Mérida FC
- 2015: Club Atlético Torque

Jorge Aude (born 22 September 1946) is a Uruguayan former football player and coach. He coached the El Salvador national team on one occasion.

== Career ==
Aude resigned as Huracán Buceo manager on 13 June 2010, citing "health problems". Days later, The Executive Committee of the Uruguayan Association of Football Coaches, expelled him as a member for having falsified a "qualification to practise the profession".
