= Martín García (footballer, born 1981) =

Colombian footballer

Personal information
- Full name: Martín Edwin García Díaz
- Date of birth: 2 March 1981 (age 45)
- Place of birth: Bogotá, Colombia
- Height: 1.86 m (6 ft 1 in)
- Position: Forward

Youth career
- América de Cali

Senior career*
| Years | Team | Apps | (Gls) |
| 1998 | Independiente Santa Fe | | |
| 1999–2000 | Envigado | | |
| 2001–2002 | Deportes Quindío | | |
| 2003–2004 | Alianza | 18 | (11) |
| 2005 | Millonarios | 31 | (8) |
| 2005–2006 | São Caetano | 11 | (2) |
| 2007 | Vasco da Gama | 9 | (3) |
| 2007 | Necaxa | 8 | (0) |
| 2008 | Millonarios | 15 | (4) |
| 2008–2009 | Necaxa | | |
| 2009 | Nanchang Bayi | 22 | (19) |
| 2009–2010 | Veracruz | | |
| 2010 | Shanghai East Asia | 12 | (2) |
| 2011 | Sport Boys | | |
| 2011 | Cienciano | | |
| 2012 | Cúcuta Deportivo | | |
| 2012 | Unión Comercio | | |
| 2013 | Tianjin Songjiang | 28 | (5) |
| 2014 | América de Cali | | |
| 2015 | Atlético Marte | 16 | (5) |
| 2015– | Cúcuta Deportivo | | |
- * Club domestic league appearances and goals

Martín Edwin García (Latin American Spanish: [maɾtinˈeðwiŋ ɡaɾˈsi.a]; (Note: In isolation, Martín and Edwin are pronounced [maɾˈtin] and [ˈeðwin] respectively.) born 2 March 1981 in Bogotá, Cundinamarca) is a Colombian football forward who last played for Tianjin Songjiang.

== Club career ==
García played youth football with América de Cali, before making his professional debut in the Copa Mustang with Independiente Santa Fe in 1998. He played several seasons with Alianza in El Salvador, before returning to Colombia where he would play several seasons with Millonarios in the Copa Mustang. He played for Vasco da Gama and São Caetano in the Campeonato Brasileiro Série A. García also had a brief spell with Necaxa in the Primera División de México.
