= C.D. Atlético Chaparratique =

Atletico Chaparrastique
- Full name: Club Deportivo Atlético Chaparrastique
- Nickname(s): Los Moncagüenses
- Founded: 1943
- Ground: Estadio Moncagua
Home colours

Club Deportivo Atletico Chaparrastique, commonly known as Atletico Chaparrastique, is a professional Salvadoran football club based in Moncagua, San Miguel, El Salvador.

== History ==
Atlético Chaparrastique were founded in 1943 and were named after the volcano near Moncagua. They have spent several seasons in the Salvadoran Second Division in the 2000s and almost secured promotion to the top tier in 2004 when they reached the Second Division Final. In 2006 they came close again, only losing at the penultimate stage. In 2008 they were relegated to the third tier.

== Stadium ==
The club started playing in the local central park before moving to the Estadio Tamarindo. After 25 years, they left for the Estadio Moncagua.

== Notable Coach ==
- (El Salvador) Manuel de la Paz Palacios
- (El Salvador) Saúl Molina (2002–2003)
