= Emiliano Pedrozo =

Argentine-born Salvadoran footballer and manager

Personal information
- Full name: Emiliano José Pedrozo Cantarero
- Date of birth: July 6, 1972 (age 54)
- Place of birth: Lanús, Argentina
- Height: 1.70 m (5 ft 7 in)
- Position: Midfielder

Senior career*
Years	Team	Apps	(Gls)
1990–1993	Victoriano Arenas		
1993–1994	Independiente (reserves)		
1994–1995	CD FAS		
1995	Central Izalco		
1996	Cojutepeque FC		
1996–1997	Once Lobos		
1997–1998	CD FAS		
1998–1999	CD Santa Clara		(17)
1999–2000	CD FAS		(12)
2000–2002	CD Atlético Marte		(18)
2002–2003	San Salvador FC		(30)
2003–2004	CD Águila		(8)
2005–2006	CD Luis Ángel Firpo		(5)
2006–2007	AD Isidro Metapán		(6)
2007–2009	Nejapa FC		(13)
2009	CD Atlético Marte		(4)

International career
2004	El Salvador	1	(0)

Managerial career
- 2008: Nejapa FC (caretaker)
- 2014–2016, 2017–2018: CD FAS (assistant)
- 2017: CD FAS
- 2020: Santa Tecla (assistant coach)
- * Club domestic league appearances and goals

Emiliano José Pedrozo Cantarero (born July 6, 1972) is an Argentine-born Salvadoran former professional football manager and former player.

== Club career ==
Born in Argentina, Pedrozo joined his fellow countrymen Dionel Bordón and Marcelo Bauza at Salvadoran side FAS in 1994. He would live to play in El Salvador for the remainder of his career, playing for several First and Second Division sides.

In 2005, Pedrozo became the seventh player to score 100 goals in Salvadoran league history, and retired with 114 goals scored in the Primera División de Fútbol de El Salvador.

== International career ==
Pedrozo became a Salvadoran citizen in 2004 and made his debut for El Salvador in a November 2004 FIFA World Cup qualification match against Panama. The match proved to be his sole international game.

== Coaching career ==
In 2010, Emiliano Pedrozo coached the Sub-18 Escuela Alemana of San Salvador football team and lead them to victory for two consecutive years.

== Managerial statistics ==
Team	Nat	From	To	Record				
Team	Nat	From	To	G	W	D	L	Win %
Nejapa	El Salvador	August 2008	September 2008	3	1	2	0	30

== Honours ==
Season	Team	Title
1994–1995	FAS	Primera División de Fútbol de El Salvador (La Primera)
1995–1996	FAS	La Primera
2003 Clausura	San Salvador	La Primera
2007 Clausura	Isidro Metapán	La Primera
