= Wilson Sánchez =

Colombian-Salvadoran footballer (born 1978)

Personal information
- Full name: Wilson Sánchez Ibarra
- Date of birth: May 25, 1978 (age 48)
- Place of birth: Colombia
- Position: Defender

Senior career*
Years	Team	Apps	(Gls)
2002	Sonsonate		
2002–2003	Juayúa		
2003–2004	Sonsonate		
2004	Isidro Metapán		
2005	Juayúa		
2006	INCA Sonsonate		
2007	Sonsonate		
2008–2010	Atlético Marte		
2010	Vista Hermosa		
2011	Platense		
2011	Santa Tecla		
2012	Juventud Retalteca		

International career
1997	Colombia U20		

Managerial career
- 2013: Sonsonate Assistant coach
- 2014: Sonsonate Interim coach
- * Club domestic league appearances and goals

Wilson Sánchez Ibarra (born May 25, 1978, in Colombia) is a retired Colombian-Salvadoran footballer.

He played for several clubs in El Salvador, including Platense, Santa Tecla F.C., Vista Hermosa and Atlético Marte.
