= Horacio Lugo =

Argentine footballer

Personal information
- Full name: José Horacio Lugo
- Date of birth: 27 May 1966 (age 60)
- Place of birth: Buenos Aires, Argentina
- Height: 1.64 m (5 ft 5 in)
- Position: Striker

Youth career
- 1985–1988: Chacarita Juniors
- 1989: Atlético Tucumán

Senior career*
Years	Team	Apps	(Gls)
1990	Chacarita Juniors		
1991–1992	Los Andes		
1992	Deportes Concepción		
1993–1994	Palestino		
1995	Deportes Concepción		
1996–1997	Alianza		
1998	Aurora		
1999	Zacapa		
2000	Alianza		
2001	Zacapa		
- * Club domestic league appearances and goals as of January 2008

José Horacio Lugo (born May 27, 1966) is a former Argentine football player, he played for more than 15 years, and after retiring moved to Richmond, Virginia.

He is the former Director of Player Development at Chesterfield United Soccer Club. Currently he is the Head Director of We Are Futbol. He is currently back in his home country after 17 years.

== Professional awards and achievements ==
- 2nd Place in the Copa Chile with Deportes Concepción (Chile).
- National Champions with Alianza F.C (El Salvador).
- Champions of Central America with Alianza F.C (El Salvador).
- Best Foreign Player (1993) in Chile.
- Best Forward (1997) in El Salvador.
- Best Foreign Player (1997) in El Salvador.
- Participation in VCU soccer program
- Holder of NSCAA National License
