= Julio Escobar =

Chilean footballer and manager (born 1945)

Personal information
- Full name: Julio del Carmen Escobar Ortiz
- Date of birth: 8 June 1945 (age 81)
- Place of birth: Chile

Senior career*
Years	Team	Apps	(Gls)
1967	Luis Ángel Firpo		

Managerial career
- 1982: Independiente de San Vicente
- 1985: Águila
- 1985: Motagua
- 1987: Luis Ángel Firpo
- 1988–1989: Luis Ángel Firpo
- 1994–1995: Luis Ángel Firpo
- 1997–1998: Luis Ángel Firpo
- 1998: El Salvador
- 1999–2000: Luis Ángel Firpo
- 2002: Alianza
- Santiagueño
- * Club domestic league appearances and goals

Julio del Carmen Escobar Ortiz (born 8 June 1945) is a Chilean former professional football player and manager.

He created a legacy in El Salvador by winning four Primera División titles with Luis Ángel Firpo.

== Honours ==
=== Manager ===
Luis Ángel Firpo

- Salvadoran Primera División: 1988–89, 1997–98, Clausura 1999, Clausura 2000
