= CD Mar y Plata =

Association football club in El Salvador

Mar y Plata
- Full name: Club Deportivo Mar y Plata
- Nicknames: "Los Camaroneros, Los Porteños”
- Founded: 1962
- Ground: Cancha Mar Y Plata, Puerto El Triunfo, El Salvador
- Chairman: Amilcar Reveló
- League: Salvadoran Third Division
Home colours

Club Deportivo Mar y Plata was a Salvadoran professional football club based in Puerto El Triunfo, Usulután, El Salvador. He disappeared from the Third Division of Salvadoran Soccer due to financial problems. The club was founded in 1962.

== Honours ==
=== Domestic honours ===
- Segunda División Salvadorean and predecessors
- Champions (1) : TBD
- Tercera División Salvadorean and predecessors
  - Champions:(1) : TBD

== List of coaches ==
- (El Salvador) Rigoberto Ramirez Tostada (1976)
- (El Salvador) Miguel Aguilar Obando (1991)
- (El Salvador) Eduardo Hernánde (2002)
- (El Salvador) Ángel Orellana (2003)
- (Uruguay) Rubén Alonso (2003)
- (El Salvador) José Antonio Andino (2004)
- (El Salvador) Rigoberto Urias (2018)
- (El Salvador) Lázaro Gutiérrez (2021)
- (El Salvador) Carlos Rinaldi Medrano (2021-)
