= Yari Silvera =

Uruguayan footballer (born 1976)

Personal information
- Full name: Yari David Silvera
- Date of birth: 20 February 1976 (age 50)
- Place of birth: Treinta y Tres, Uruguay
- Height: 1.73 m (5 ft 8 in)
- Position: Forward

Senior career*
Years	Team	Apps	(Gls)
1995–1999	River Plate Montevideo	58	(10)
2000	Huachipato	0	(0)
2000–2001	Bucheon SK		
2002	Plaza Colonia		
2002–2003	Banfield	17	(0)
2003	Bucheon SK		
2004	Alianza FC		
2005	Juventud Las Piedras	21	(1)
2006	Heredia Jaguares		
2006–2007	Cerro Largo	19	(1)
2007	Rampla Juniors		
2008	Central Español	9	(0)
2011–2013	Defensor Maldonado	–	(–)

International career
1995–1997	Uruguay	2	(0)
- * Club domestic league appearances and goals

Yari David Silvera (born February 20, 1976) is a former Uruguayan footballer as a forward.

He was born in Treinta y Tres, and has played for clubs of Uruguay, Chile, Argentina, South Korea, El Salvador and Guatemala.

== Teams ==
- (Uruguay) River Plate de Montevideo 1995–1999
- (Chile) Huachipato 2000
- (South Korea) Bucheon SK 2000–2001
- (Uruguay) Plaza Colonia 2002
- (Argentina) Banfield 2002–2003
- (South Korea) Bucheon SK 2003
- (El Salvador) Alianza FC 2004
- (Uruguay) Juventud Las Piedras 2005
- (Guatemala) Heredia Jaguares 2006
- (Uruguay) Cerro Largo 2006–2007
- (Uruguay) Rampla Juniors 2007
- (Uruguay) Central Español 2008

== Post-retirement ==
Silvera has served as a football coach for youth teams in Maldonado, Uruguay.
