= Washington de la Cruz =

Uruguayan footballer (born 1964)

Personal information
- Full name: Washington Adrián de la Cruz
- Date of birth: May 26, 1964 (age 62)
- Place of birth: Montevideo, Uruguay
- Height: 1.69 m (5 ft 7 in)
- Position: Defender

Youth career
- Inferiors Peñarol

Senior career*
Years	Team	Apps	(Gls)
1984	Atlético Suramerica		
1985	Alianza		
1985–1989	UCA		
1989	Atlético Balboa		
- Arsenal
1995	Atlético Marte		
1996–1999	Alianza		
2000	Santa Clara		
2001–2002	Alianza		

International career^{‡}
1998	El Salvador	4	(0)
- * Club domestic league appearances and goals as of 30 October 2007 ‡ National team caps and goals as of 6 March 2011

Washington Adrián de la Cruz (born 26 May 1964 in Montevideo, Uruguay) is a retired Salvadoran–Uruguayan footballer.

== Club career ==
Nicknamed Adriancillo, de la Cruz played for the Peñarol youth team in his native Uruguay. He joined Salvadoran side Alianza in 1985 and had three spells with them, winning several league titles. In between these three periods he also played for second division sides Atlético Balboa and Arsenal as well as for Atlético Marte.

== International career ==
De la Cruz made his debut for El Salvador in a January 1998 friendly match against Honduras and has earned a total of 4 caps, scoring no goals. He has represented his country at the 1998 CONCACAF Gold Cup.

His final international game was a February 1998 CONCACAF Gold Cup match against Jamaica.

== Honours ==
Season	Team	Title
1993–1994	Alianza F.C.	Primera División de Fútbol de El Salvador (La Primera)
1996–1997	Alianza F.C.	La Primera
Copa Interclubes UNCAF	Alianza F.C.	1997 UNCAF Club Cup
1998 Apertura	Alianza F.C.	La Primera
2001 Clausura	Alianza F.C.	La Primera
