= C.D. San Luis =

San Luis F.C.
- Full name: Club Deportivo San Luis Futbol Club
- Founded: 1 January 1967
- Ground: Estadio de San Luis Talpa, San Luis Talpa, El Salvador
- Chairman: Adrián Beltrán
Home colours

Club Deportivo San Luis Futbol Club is a Salvadoran football club based in San Luis Talpa, La Paz.

== History ==
The team competed in the first division in 2000/2001 season after purchasing the spot of Santa Clara. However the club were relegated after one season and have failed to be promoted to the first division again.

== Former coaches ==
Argentina

- (Argentina) Raúl Héctor Cocherari (-Feb 2001)

El Salvador

- (El Salvador) Cecilio Monge
- (El Salvador) Raúl Corcio Zavaleta
- (El Salvador) Saúl Molina (2001)
- (El Salvador) Ivan Ruiz
- (El Salvador) Marco Pineda
