= Cesar Acevedo =

Salvadoran footballer and coach (born 1953)

Personal information
- Date of birth: 5 September 1953 (age 73)
- Place of birth: Chalchuapa, Santa Ana Department, El Salvador
- Position: Midfielder

Senior career*
Years	Team	Apps	(Gls)
1969–1979	FAS		(47)

International career
1976	El Salvador	1	(0)

Managerial career
- 1990–1992: Apaneca FC
- 1993–1995: Arcense
- 1998–1999: El Salvador U-17
- 2009: Acajutla F.C.
- 2010–2014: Once Lobos
- 2014: Sonsonate
- 2015: Once Lobos
- 2015–2016: Nuevo San Sebastian
- 2017: Once Lobos
- 2019: Once Lobos
- * Club domestic league appearances and goals

Cesar Acevedo (born 5 September 1953) is a Salvadoran football manager and former player who coaches Nuevo San Sebastian.

== Career ==
Acevedo spent his entire playing career at FAS in the primera division scoring 47 goals. He was part of the FAS squad that won the 1979 CONCACAF Champions' Cup.

He played for the El Salvador national team, appearing in the 1978 FIFA World Cup qualifying rounds against Panama on 2 May 1976.

After he retired from playing, Acevedo began coaching football. He has managed the El Salvador youth national teams and club sides including Once Lobos.

== Personal ==
He is the younger brother of Salvadoran World Cup player Elmer Acevedo.
