= Marcelo Bauza =

Argentine footballer

Personal information
- Full name: Marcelo Daniel Bauza
- Date of birth: 26 May 1965 (age 61)
- Place of birth: Argentina
- Position: Defender

Senior career*
Years	Team	Apps	(Gls)
1983–1984	Ferro Carril Oeste		
- CA Kimberley
1993	The Strongest		
1994–1997	FAS		
1996–1997	Alianza		
1998	Lawn Tennis FC		
1999	Club Blooming		
- * Club domestic league appearances and goals

Marcelo Daniel Bauza (born Argentina) is a retired Argentine football (soccer) player, who played as a defender. His son, Juan Bauza is also a footballer.
