= Saúl Molina =

Salvadoran footballer and coach (born 1938)

Personal information
- Full name: Saúl Victorino Molina
- Date of birth: March 14, 1938 (age 88)
- Place of birth: Nueva Guadalupe, San Miguel, El Salvador
- Positions: Midfielder; striker

Senior career*
Years	Team	Apps	(Gls)
1957–1958	Dragón		
1958–1964	Águila		
1965–1968	Luis Ángel Firpo		
1969–1970	Águila		

International career^{‡}
- El Salvador

Managerial career
- 1981: Águila
- 1995: Tiburones
- 2000: Santa Clara
- 2001: San Luis
- 2001, 2005: Dragón
- 2002–2003: Atlético Chaparrastique
- 2004–2005: Coca Cola
- 2005: Águila
- * Club domestic league appearances and goals as of January 2008 ‡ National team caps and goals as of 2008

Saúl Victorino Molina (born 14 March 1938) is a retired Salvadoran professional footballer who later became a coach in El Salvador and Costa Rica.

== Club career ==
Molina started his career at Dragón while at the same time studying to become a teacher. He then spent too much time training with the national team that Dragón let him go and he joined Second Division side Águila in 1958. He took part in their promotion to the Primera División de Fútbol de El Salvador and formed a dangerous frontline partnership with players like Juan Francisco Barraza and Juan Antonio Merlos. He also won his and the club's first league title in 1959, scoring the only goal of the second leg of the Final. In 1965 he left Aguila for Luis Ángel Firpo after falling out with Argentinian coach Rodolfo Orlandini, but at Firpo he got injured soon and decided to retire from playing. After four years of retirement he returned to train with Dragón and then had a short stint at Aguila before a back injury cut short his career.

== International career ==
Molina has represented El Salvador.

== Managerial career ==
In 1981, he took up his first post as a coach when he took charge of 'his' Águila. He was appointed manager of Santa Clara in March 2000. In 2002-2003 he coached second division side Atlético Chaparrastique almost to promotion. In April 2005 he was again appointed technical director of Águila.
