= Rafael Barrientos (footballer) =

Salvadoran footballer (born 1979)

Personal information
- Full name: Rafael Ernesto Barrientos Cruz
- Date of birth: May 12, 1979 (age 47)
- Place of birth: San Salvador, El Salvador
- Position: Midfielder

Senior career*
Years	Team	Apps	(Gls)
1999–2000	FAS		
2000–2003	Luis Ángel Firpo		
2004–2005	Alianza		
2006–2007	Once Municipal		
2007–2009	Nejapa	74	(0)

International career^{‡}
1998–1999	El Salvador U20		
2000–2002	El Salvador U23		
2000–2001	El Salvador	12	(0)
- * Club domestic league appearances and goals as of January 2007 ‡ National team caps and goals as of 9 January 2011

Rafael Ernesto Barrientos Cruz (born May 12, 1979) is a retired Salvadoran footballer.

== Club career ==
Nicknamed el Chele, Barrientos started his career at FAS, where he played alongside talented teenagers Gilberto Murgas and Eliseo Quintanilla. He then joined C.D. Luis Ángel Firpo with whom he would stay for three years. In 2004, he moved to Alianza F.C., only to leave them after a year for Once Municipal with whom he would win the 2006 Apertura. He signed for Nejapa F.C. in 2007 and finished his career in December 2009.

== International career ==
Barrientos made his debut for El Salvador in a July 2000 friendly match against Mexico and has earned a total of 12 caps, scoring no goals. He has represented his country in 3 FIFA World Cup qualification matches and played at the 2001 UNCAF Nations Cup.

His final international was the June 2001 UNCAF Cup match against Costa Rica.
