= Mario Guevara =

Salvadoran footballer (born 1971)

Personal information
- Full name: Mario Elías Guevara Rivera
- Date of birth: March 1, 1971 (age 55)
- Place of birth: Sonsonate, El Salvador
- Height: 1.71 m (5 ft 7 in)
- Position: Defender

Youth career
- 1987: Apaneca Pepsi
- 1989: Acajutla

Senior career*
Years	Team	Apps	(Gls)
1990–1995	Tiburones		
1996–2005	Alianza FC		
2006–2008	Once Municipal		
2008–2010	Alba-Acajutla		

International career
1999–2004	El Salvador	18	(0)

Managerial career
- 2015–2016: Sonsonate FC (reserves)
- 2016–2018: Sonsonate FC (assistant)
- 2018: Sonsonate FC (interim)
- 2018: Sonsonate FC
- 2020: Once Deportivo (physical trainer)
- * Club domestic league appearances and goals

Mario Elías Guevara Rivera (born March 1, 1971) is a Salvadoran former professional footballer who played as a defender.

== Club career ==
Nicknamed el Jefe (the boss), Guevara started his career at local club Tiburones, then had a lengthy spell at Primera División club Alianza F.C. with whom he won several league titles.

After 10 seasons with them he moved to Once Municipal to become player/coach in 2006, and finished his career with a return to lower league outfit Alba-Ajacutla.

== International career ==
Guevara made his debut for El Salvador in a March 1999 UNCAF Nations Cup match against Guatemala and has earned a total of 18 caps, scoring no goals. He has represented his country in 7 FIFA World Cup qualification matches as well as at the 1999 UNCAF Nations Cup.

His final international game was a September 2004 FIFA World Cup qualification match against Jamaica.

== Honours ==
=== Player ===
Alianza F.C.

- Salvadoran Primera División: Apertura 1998, Apertura 2001, Clausura 2004; runner-up Clausura 2002

Once Municipal

- Salvadoran Primera División: Apertura 2006
