= Óscar Navarro =

Salvadoran footballer (born 1979)

Personal information
- Full name: Óscar Alberto Navarro Meléndez
- Date of birth: January 13, 1979 (age 47)
- Place of birth: La Libertad, El Salvador
- Height: 1.72 m (5 ft 8 in)
- Position: Midfielder

Team information
- Current team: Santa Tecla reserves (manager)

Youth career
- 1994–1997: Alianza

Senior career*
Years	Team	Apps	(Gls)
1997–2008	Alianza		
2008–2009	Chalatenango		
2009–2010	Nejapa F.C.		
2010–2012	C.D. UES		
2012–2015	Santa Tecla F.C.		

International career
1999	El Salvador U-23		
2001–2003	El Salvador	8	(0)

Managerial career
- 2017–2018: Santa Tecla F.C. reserves (manager)
- 2020: C.D. UES
- * Club domestic league appearances and goals

Óscar Alberto Navarro Meléndez (born January 13, 1979) is a Salvadoran former professional footballer who played as a midfielder.

== Club career ==
Navarro was born in La Libertad, El Salvador. He started his career with Alianza at a very young age.

He would go on to play for Alianza for a little more than 13 years, winning four league titles with them. He captained Alianza for several years.

He then left Alianza to join Chalatenango and in 2009, moved to Nejapa.

In 2010, he joined UES, but an injury took him out of the game until at least September 2011.

== International career ==
Navarro, a creative midfielder, has also played for the Salvadoran Under-23.

He made his senior debut for El Salvador in an October 2001 friendly match against Mexico and has earned a total of eight caps, scoring no goals.

He has represented his country at the 2002 CONCACAF Gold Cup and was a non-playing squad member at the 2003 CONCACAF Gold Cup.

His final international game was a July 2003 friendly match against Guatemala.

== Honours ==
Season	Team	Title
1996–1997	Alianza	Primera División de Fútbol de El Salvador (La Primera)
1997	Alianza	Torneo Grandes de Centroamerica 1997
Apertura 1998	Alianza	La Primera
Apertura 2001	Alianza	La Primera
2004 Clausura	Alianza	La Primera
