= C.D. Santa Clara de El Salvador =

Association football club in El Salvador

C.D. Santa Clara
- Full name: Club Deportivo Santa Clara
- Nickname: Los Potros
- Ground: Estadio Hacienda Santa Clara, San Luis Talpa
- Manager: (El Salvador) Miguel Angel Soriano
- League: Tercera División Salvadorean
- Apertura 2024: Champions
Home colours

Club Deportivo Santa Clara is a Salvadoran professional football club based in San Luis Talpa, La Paz. The club currently plays in the Tercera División Salvadorean.

The team was in the first division of El Salvador between 1997 and 2001.

== History ==
On January 8, Santa Clara announced on the team social media platform that due to several sponsors pulling support, high team cost and lack of fans support, the club announced they would be withdrawing from the Tercera Division, this is despite just winning Apertura 2024 title.

== Honours ==
- Segunda División Salvadoran and predecessors
  - Champions (1) : 1997–1998
- Tercera División Salvadorean and predecessors
  - Champions (1) : Apertura 2024
  - Runner-up (2) : N/A
  - Play-off winner (2): N/A
- ADFAS and predecessors
  - Champions - La Paz Department (1) : 2022–23,
  - Promotion Play-off winner (2): 2022–23

== Current squad ==
Note: Flags indicate national team as defined under FIFA eligibility rules; some limited exceptions apply. Players may hold more than one non-FIFA nationality.

No.	Pos.	Nation	Player
—		SLV	Andres Gonzalez
—		SLV	Jose Monterrosa
—		SLV	Ronaldo Molina
—		SLV	Roberto Carlos
—		SLV	Leandro Arevalo
—		SLV	Desnis Reynado
—		SLV	Bladimir Tamacas
—		SLV	Luis Miguel
—		SLV	Cristian Burgos

No.	Pos.	Nation	Player
—		SLV	Willian Rivas
—		SLV	
—		SLV	
—		SLV	
—		SLV	
—		SLV	

== Top Scorer ==
- (Argentina) (El Salvador) Emiliano Pedrozo (12 goals in 1998/1999 Clausura)

== List Of Coaches ==
El Salvador

- (El Salvador) Rubén Guevara (1998-July 1998)
- (El Salvador) Eduardo Lara Moscote (July 1998 – December 1998)
- (El Salvador) Pedro (January 1999 - May 1999)
- (El Salvador) Manuel Mejía (June 1999 -)
- (El Salvador) Carlos Mejía
- (El Salvador) Saúl Molina
- (El Salvador) Ricardo Mancilla (June 2023-Dec 2023)
- (El Salvador) Miguel Angel Soriano (2024-Present)

== Winners of Man shot Chart Salvadoran Newspaper ==
- (Argentina) (El Salvador) Emiliano Pedrozo (Clausura 1999) Goles Marcados 11
