= Sonsonate F.C. =

Association football club in El Salvador

Sonsonate
- Full name: Sonsonate Fútbol Club
- Nickname: Los Cocoteros
- Founded: 2 March 1948; 78 years ago, as Sonsonate FC; 9 September 2009; 16 years ago as Futbol Club Sonsonate
- Ground: Estadio Anna Mercedes Campos
- Capacity: 8,000
- President: (El Salvador) TBD
- Manager: (Uruguay) Rubén da Silva
- League: (El Salvador) Primera División
- 2020 Apertura: Overall: 8th Playoffs: Quarterfinal
- Website: www.sonsonate.cf
Home colours	Away colours

Sonsonate Fútbol Club is a Salvadoran professional football club based in Sonsonate, El Salvador.

The club plays its home games at Estadio Anna Mercedes Campos, a stadium located in the City suburb of Sonsonate, Sonsonate, since 2009. The team is currently led by head coach Uruguayan Rubén da Silva.

== History ==
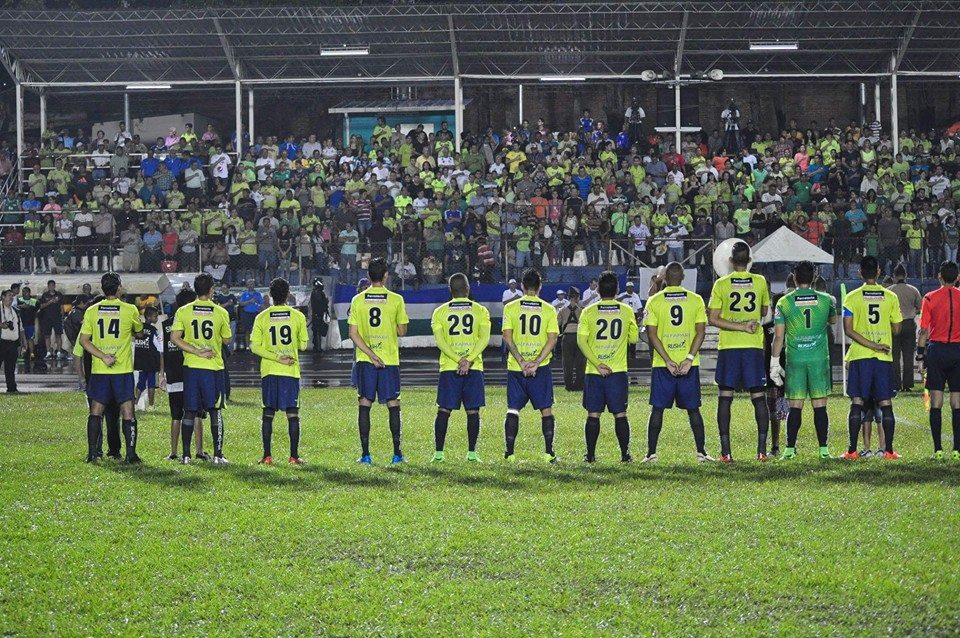
Sonsonate squad in 2016 season

On 9 September 2009, César Antonio Contreras and Miguel Antonio Castillo along with Pedro Antonio Contreras and with the support of the Sonsonate department (in particular the head of the department José Roberto Aquino) were able to re-activate Sonsonate from defunct status and begin their time in the modern era.

The club competed in the Tercera División for a few years, before winning promotion to the Segunda División in 2011, under the direction of Ricardo Andrés Navarro.

Despite strong club following and several finals appearances the club failed to win either the Segunda Division Apertura or Clausura title to achieve promotion in the Primera Division.

However, on 12 July 2015, the club purchased the spot of recently promoted Real Destroyer meaning the club will participate in the Primera division for the first time in fifteen years (last time was 1999).

Despite several Championship winning managers coaching Sonsonate, Peruvian Agustin Castillo, Uruguayan Rubén da Silva and Salvadoran Juan Ramon Sanchez have been the only coaches to qualify Sonsonate to the post season final series, the club reached the semi-finals under Agustin Castillo and Ruben Da Silva, and Quarter final under Juan Ramon Sanchez, before each time being eliminated by Alianza F.C.

== Sponsorship ==
Companies that Sonsonate currently has sponsorship deals with include:

- Milan – Official kit suppliers
- Proaces – Official sponsors
- Credimarco – Official sponsors
- Alcasa – Official sponsors
- Alcadia de Sonsonate –
- Fenix Inversiones e Inmobiliario
- Caja de credito Sonsonate
- Salud
- Ferreteria Santa Sofia

== Stadium ==
- Estadio Anna Mercedes Campos; Sonsonate (2009–)
  - Estadio Municipal de Izalco; Izalco ()
  - Estadio Cepa; Acajutla (2008)
  - Estadio Julio Milian Morales; Juayúa (2015)

The team plays its home games in Estadio Anna Mercedes Campos, in Sonsonate, which opened in and has a seating capacity of 8,000. Previously the team played at Estadio Cepa for the 2009 season when they were called Alba-Acajutla which is located in Acajutla. They also previously played at the Estadio Municipal de Izalco in Izalco, which has a capacity of 8,000.

For the 2015 season, Sonsonate played their home matches (due to renovations being done Estadio Anna Mercedes Campos) at the Estadio José Millán Morales which is located in Juayúa.

== Colors and nicknames ==
=== Official Kits ===
- Official Sponsor: Rush Athletic
- Holder Uniform : Green T-shirt, blue-black shorts, black stockings.
- Visiting Uniform: White shirt with light green stripes and white pants with green vivid, white socks with green vivid.
- Alternative uniform: Traditional green shirt with white stripe on the chest and green shorts, green socks.

1948–07	2008–09	2013–

Sonsonate wore the green and white striped jersey since their establishment.

Various name changes have brought about different colored jerseys. In 2008, after the club relocated from Sonsonate to Acatulja, the club changed their colours to rad and white.

However, after the club moved back to Sonsonate they reverted to green and white.

=== Nicknames ===
- Los Tiburones (the Sharks) Known while at Alba Acajutla
- Los Cocoteros (The Coconuts)

== Honours ==
=== Domestic honours ===
==== Leagues ====
- Tercera División Salvadorean
  - Winners: 2011

== Club records ==
For records of Sonsonate pre 2009 are located records of Sonsonate FC.

- First victory in the Primera Division for Sonsonate: 1–0 Santa Tecla 28 January 2016
- First goalscorer in the Primera Division for Sonsonate: Augusto do Carmo v Dragon 1 November 2015
- Largest Home victory, Primera División: 3–0 v Pasaquina, 23 April 2018
- Largest Away victory, Primera División: 3–0 v FAS, 27 November 2016
- Largest Home loss, Primera División: 0–4 v Alianza, 12 December 2016
- Largest Away loss, Primera División: 0–4 v FAS, 3 April 2016
  0–4 v UES, 27 April 2016
- Highest home attendance: 8,000 v Primera División, Estadio Anna Mercedes Campos, Sonsonate, Day Month Year
- Highest away attendance: 12,621 v Primera División, TBD, San Salvador, Day Month Year
- Highest average attendance, season: 49,176, Primera División
- Most appearances, Primera División: 602, TBD 1972–1991
- Most goals scored, Primera División: 35, Primera División Apertura 2016
- Most goals scored, season, Primera División: 35, Primera División Apertura 2016

=== Individual records ===
- Record appearances (all competitions): TBD, 822 from 1957 to 1975
- Record appearances (Primera Division): Salvadoran Edson Melendez, 125 from 2016
- Most capped player for El Salvador: 63 (0 whilst at Sonsonate), Juan Jose Gomez
- Most international caps for El Salvador while an Sonsonate player: 2, Henry Hernandez
- Most caps won whilst at Sonsonate: 2, Henry Hernandez.
- Record scorer in league: Panamanian Armando Polo, 28
- Most goals in a season (all competitions): TBD, 62 (1927/28) (47 in League, 15 in Cup competitions)
- Most goals in a season (Primera Division): Panamanian Armando Polo, 13

=== Most appearances ===
Place	Name	Period	Primera Division	Playoffs	SLV Cup	Continental	Total
1	(El Salvador) Edson Melendez	2017–2021	140	0	0	0	**140**
2	(El Salvador) Marcos Adonay Rodriguez	2015–2017, 2019–2021	110	0	0	0	**110**
3	(El Salvador) **Rene Gomez**	2017 –2021	104	0	0	0	**104**
4	(El Salvador) Ivan Barahona	2015-2017, 2018–2019	94	0	0	0	94
5	(El Salvador) Roberto Gonzales	2015, 2018–2020	81	0	0	0	**81**
6	(Brazil) Ze Paulo	2016–2017	68	0	0	0	**68**
7	(El Salvador) Carlos Arévalo	2018–2020	68	0	0	0	**68**
8	(Colombia) Daley Mena	2019-2020	55	0	0	0	**55**
9	(El Salvador) Kevin Ayala Mendoza	2019	54	0	0	0	54
10	(El Salvador) Julio Sibrian	2018–2020	53	0	0	0	**53**
10	(El Salvador) Jorge Moran	2018–2020	52	0	0	0	**52**

Bolded players are currently on the Sonsonate roster.

=== Goals ===
Place	Name	Period	Primera Division	Playoffs	SLV Cup	Continental	Total
1	(Panama) Armando Polo	2017–2018	28	0	0	0	28
2	(Brazil) Ze Paulo	2016–2017	17	0	0	0	17
3	(El Salvador) Roberto Gonzales	2015, 2018–2020	14	0	0	0	14
5	(Argentina) David Boquin	2019–2020	11	0	0	0	11
4	(Brazil) Rene Martinez (Valderrama)	1999–2000	9	0	0	0	9
6	(El Salvador) William Maldonado	2019–	9	0	0	0	9
6	(El Salvador) Elman Rivas	2019–	9	0	0	0	9
6	(El Salvador) Christian Sanchez	2017–2018	7	0	0	0	7

Bolded players are currently on the Sonsonate roster.

=== Most shutouts ===
Place	Name	Period	Primera Division	Playoffs	SLV Cup	Continental	Total
1	(El Salvador) Oscar Martinez	2019–present	15	0	0	0	15
2	(El Salvador) **Gustavo Vega'**	2019–present	8	0	0	0	8
3	(El Salvador) Henry Hernandez	2017–2018	4	0	0	0	4
4	(El Salvador) Julio Martinez	2019–present	3	0	0	0	3
5	(El Salvador) **Luis Chamagua**	2019–present	2	0	0	0	2
6	(El Salvador) Ismael Valladares	2019–present	2	0	0	0	2
7	(El Salvador) Luis Contrera	2019–present	2	0	0	0	2
8	(El Salvador) Hector Ramirez	2019–present	1	0	0	0	1
9	(El Salvador) William Torres	2019–present	1	0	0	0	1
10	(El Salvador) **Rodrigo Argueta'**	2019–present	1	0	0	0	1

Bolded players are currently on the Sonsonate roster.

== Current squad ==
As of 2021:

Note: Flags indicate national team as defined under FIFA eligibility rules; some limited exceptions apply. Players may hold more than one non-FIFA nationality.

No.	Pos.	Nation	Player
1	GK	SLV	Héctor Ramirez
2	DF	SLV	Kevin Calderón
3	MF	SLV	Jacobo Moreno
4	DF	SLV	Edson Meléndez
6		URU	Andres Lima
7	MF	SLV	Jorge Morán (Captain)
10	FW	SLV	William Maldonado
11		SLV	Espinal Levin
12	MF	SLV	Henry Alvarega
14		SLV	Johnathan Murga

No.	Pos.	Nation	Player
15	FW	SLV	Marcos Rodriguez
16		SLV	Carlos Herrera
17	DF	SLV	Kevin Ayala
19	MF	SLV	Aldair Rivera
20		COL	Víctor Landazuri
21	MF	SLV	René Gómez
22		SLV	Enner Orellana
23	DF	SLV	Alexis Renderos
25	GK	SLV	Gustavo Vega
—	GK	SLV	Héctor Carbajal

=== In ===
Note: Flags indicate national team as defined under FIFA eligibility rules; some limited exceptions apply. Players may hold more than one non-FIFA nationality.

No.	Pos.	Nation	Player
—		COL	Víctor Landazuri (From TBA)
—		URU	Andres Lima (From TBA)
—		SLV	TBD (From TBA)

No.	Pos.	Nation	Player
—		SLV	TBD (From TBA)
—		SLV	TBD (From TBA)

=== Out ===
Note: Flags indicate national team as defined under FIFA eligibility rules; some limited exceptions apply. Players may hold more than one non-FIFA nationality.

No.	Pos.	Nation	Player
—	GK	SLV	Luis Montoya (To TBA)
—	DF	SLV	Carlos Arevalo (To Once Deportivo)
—	FW	SLV	Roberto Gonzalez (To Santa Tecla F.C.)
—	FW	ARG	David Boquin (To TBA)

No.	Pos.	Nation	Player
—		COL	Jose Alberto Mondragon (To TBD)
—		COL	Daniel Buitrago (To TBD)
—		SLV	TBD (To TBA)
—		SLV	TBD (To TBA)

=== Out on loan ===
Note: Flags indicate national team as defined under FIFA eligibility rules; some limited exceptions apply. Players may hold more than one non-FIFA nationality.

No.	Pos.	Nation	Player
—	FW	SLV	Lester Blanco (to Phrae United)
—	FW	SLV	Abilio Torres (to TBD)

No.	Pos.	Nation	Player
—	MF	SLV	Nelson Morales (to TBD)
—	GK	SLV	Rodrigo Artiga (to TBD)

=== Players with dual citizenship ===
- (El Salvador) (Canada) Sebastien Rondeau

== Current Technical Staff ==
=== Coaching staff ===
Position	Staff
Manager	(Uruguay) Fabio Castromán
Assistant Manager	(Uruguay) Edison Pablo Ojeda
Reserve Manager	(El Salvador) Raul Orellana
Under 17 Manager	(El Salvador) TBD
Ladies Manager	(El Salvador) Angel Olivio
Goalkeeper Coach	(El Salvador) Mauricio Henriquez Vargas
Fitness Coach	(El Salvador) Wilber Melara
Reserve Fitness Coach	(El Salvador) TBD
Director of Sports	(El Salvador) TBD
Team Doctors	(El Salvador) TBD
Team Doctors	(El Salvador) TBD
Team Orthopedist	(El Salvador) TBD
Team Kines-logical	(El Salvador) Abraham Rodriguez
Team utility manager	(El Salvador) TBD
The reserve team props	(El Salvador) TBD

== Current Owners C.D. Sonsonate ==
=== Management ===
Position	Staff
Owner	(El Salvador) Sonsonate Municipal Association
President	(El Salvador) Walter Castaneda
Vice President	(El Salvador) Municipalidad de Sonsonate
Club Representative	(El Salvador) TBD
Sports Manager	(El Salvador) Fredy Vega

== Affiliate Team ==
=== Reserve squad ===
As of 2018: Note: Flags indicate national team as defined under FIFA eligibility rules; some limited exceptions apply. Players may hold more than one non-FIFA nationality.

No.	Pos.	Nation	Player
31	GK	SLV	Pablo Escobar
32	MF	SLV	Daniel Escobar
33	FW	SLV	José Méndez
34	MF	SLV	Álvaro Pérez
36	DF	SLV	Elmer Ramírez
37	DF	SLV	José Tobar Cornejo
38	DF	SLV	Erickson Mancía
39	DF	SLV	Emerson Miranda
42	MF	SLV	Carlos Castro Puente
43	MF	SLV	Bryan Ramírez

No.	Pos.	Nation	Player
44	DF	SLV	Jonathan Ruano
45	MF	CAN	Sebastien Rondeau
46	DF	SLV	Eduardo García
47	MF	SLV	Geovanni Aguilar
48	DF	SLV	Alfredo Alvarado
49	MF	SLV	Osvaldo Martínez
50	MF	SLV	Billy Ramírez
51	FW	SLV	José Marroquín Zepeda
55	GK	SLV	Marcelo Erazo

== List of Sonsonate coaches (2009–2021) ==
Sonsonate have had 25 different managers since the return era in 2009. Uruguayan Rubén da Silva served the longest term, being in office for one year and 10 months. Hector Jara, Cesar Acevedo, Wilson Sánchez, and Rubén Alonso served two terms each, while Mario Elias Guevara served three.

For coaches of Sonsonate pre 2009 are located List of Sonsonate FC coaches.

Name	Nationality	Years	Ref.
Rubén Alonso	URU	2009–2010	
Cesar Acevedo "El Piscuchita"	SLV	2010	
Andrés Navarro	SLV	2011–2012	
Ivan Martínez	SLV	2012	
Rubén Alonso	URU	2013 – January 2014	
Henry Rojas	SLV	January 2014 – February 2014	
Wilson Sánchez *	COL	February 2014 – March 2014	
Hector Jara	Chile	March 2014 – June 2014	
Cesar Acevedo "El Piscuchita"	SLV	June 2014 – September 2014	
Wilson Sánchez *	COL	September 2014 – October 2014	
Alfonso Nerio	SLV	October 2014 – December 2014	
Ivan 'Diablo' Ruiz	SLV	January 2015 – June 2015	
German Pérez	HON	June 2015 – August 2015	
Ennio Mendoza and Mario Guevara *	SLV	August 2015	
Hector Jara	Chile	August 2015 – October 2015	
Edwin Portillo	SLV	October 2015 – April 2016	
William Renderos Iraheta	SLV	April 2016 – May 2016	
Ennio Mendoza and Mario Guevara *	SLV	May 2016	
Agustin Castillo	PER	June 2016 – February 2017	
Ernesto Góchez *	SLV	March 2017	
Eraldo Correia	BRA	March 2017 – May 2017	
Garabet Avedissian	URU	May 2017 – August 2017	
Rubén Alonso	URU	September 2017 – February 2018	
Mario Guevara (interim)	SLV	February 2018– March 2018	
Juan Ramón Sánchez	SLV	March 2018– June 2018	
Juan Ramón Paredes	SLV	June 2018 – August 2018	
Mario Elias Guevara	SLV	August 2018 – September 2018	
Hugo Ovelar	PAR	September 2018 – December 2018	
Nelson Mauricio Ancheta	SLV	December 2018– February 2019	
Omar Pimentel (interim)	SLV	February 2019 – March 2019	
Rubén da Silva	URU	March 2019 – January 2021	
Fabio Castroman	URU	January 2021 - May 2021	
Hiatus	SLV	June 2021 - Present	

== Notable players ==
=== Team captains ===
Name	Years
(El Salvador) Ronald Villalta	2015
(El Salvador) Mauricio Quintanilla	2016
(El Salvador) Mario Martinez	2016
(El Salvador) Marcelo Messias	2017
(El Salvador) Carlos Carrillo	2017–2018
(El Salvador) Christian Sánchez	2018–2019
(El Salvador) Jorge Morán	2019–
