= Celio Rodríguez =

Brazilian-Salvadoran footballer (born 1969)

Personal information
- Full name: Celio Roberto Rodríguez da Silva
- Date of birth: September 20, 1969 (age 57)
- Place of birth: Paranaíba, Brazil
- Positions: Attacking midfielder; striker

Senior career*
Years	Team	Apps	(Gls)
- SE Matsubara
- Catanduvense
- CR Vasco da Gama
–1991	Puebla		
1992–2001	Luis Ángel Firpo		
1996–1997	El Roble (loan)		

International career
- Brazil U-19
- Brazil U-20
2000	El Salvador	1	(0)
- * Club domestic league appearances and goals as of 1 February 2012

Celio Roberto Rodríguez da Silva (born September 20, 1969 in Paranaíba, Brazil) is a retired Brazilian and naturalized Salvadoran football player.

== Club career ==
Rodríguez was born Célio Rodrigues in Brasil and played for several local teams in his early years before making the move to Mexican side Puebla. In 1992, he moved to El Salvador’s First Division League and launched a lengthy career with Luis Ángel Firpo with whom he would win 5 league titles and stay for 10 years, except for a season on loan to El Roble. In 1997, he was joint top goalscorer of the Primera División de Fútbol de El Salvador. He officially retired in 2001 although he still played a few games in 2002.

== International career ==
A naturalized Salvadoran citizen, Rodríguez made his debut for El Salvador in an August 2000 friendly match against Haiti, but he failed to impress and got injured. The match in the end proved to be his only international game.

== Retirement ==
Rodríguez retired in 2001 to become vicar of the church of Usulután, after he had studied theology during his football career.

== Personal life ==
He is married to Karla Marina Sigüenza and they have one daughter together. His daughter's name is Camila Rodriguez.

== Honours ==
Luis Ángel Firpo

- Primera División de Fútbol de El Salvador: 1995, 1996, 1997, Apertura 1998, Clausura 2000
