= Alejandro Curbelo =

Uruguayan footballer (born 1973)

Personal information
- Full name: Alejandro César Curbelo Aguete
- Date of birth: 19 September 1973 (age 53)
- Place of birth: Montevideo, Uruguay
- Height: 1.82 m (6 ft 0 in)
- Position: Defender

Senior career*
Years	Team	Apps	(Gls)
1997	Miramar Misiones		
1998	Basañez		
1999	Central Español		
2000	Alianza		
2001	Montevideo Wanderers	27	(1)
2002–2003	Nacional	38	(0)
2003–2004	Alianza		
2005	Defensor Sporting	3	(0)
2006–2008	Cerro Largo		
2008	Racing Club de Montevideo		

International career
2001	Uruguay	3	(0)

Managerial career
- 2008: Alianza F.C. (assistant)
- 2010: Atenas de San Carlos (assistant)
- 2012: Atenas de San Carlos
- 2013–2014: Alianza F.C.
- * Club domestic league appearances and goals

Alejandro César Curbelo Aguete (born 19 September 1973 in Montevideo) is a former Uruguayan footballer.

== International career ==
Curbelo made three appearances for the senior Uruguay national football team at the 2001 Copa América.
