= 2015–16 Primera División de El Salvador =

Primera División de El Salvador
- Season: 2015–16
- Champions: Alianza (Apertura); Dragón (Clausura)
- Relegated: Atlético Marte
- Champions League: Alianza; Dragón
- Matches: 145 (Apertura)
- Goals: 358 (2.47 per match) (Apertura)
- Top goalscorer: David Rugamas (Isidro Metapán) 12
- Biggest home win: Santa Tecla 8–0 Pasaquina (February 12, 2016)
- Biggest away win: FAS 0–5 Santa Tecla (November 22, 2015)
- Highest scoring: Isidro Metapán 3–4 Alianza (August 9, 2015); Sonsonate 3–4 Alianza (September 26, 2015); Santa Tecla 5–2 Alianza (September 30, 2015)
- Longest winning run: 7 games by: FAS
- Longest unbeaten run: 7 games by: Dragón, FAS
- Longest winless run: 12 games by: Juventud Independiente, UES
- Longest losing run: 5 games by: UES
- All statistics correct as of December 20, 2015.

The 2015–16 Primera División de El Salvador (also known as the Liga Pepsi) was the 18th season and 35th and 36th tournament of El Salvador's Primera División since its establishment of an Apertura and Clausura format. Isidro Metapán and Santa Tecla were the defending champions of the Apertura and Clausura, respectively. The league consisted of 12 teams. Two seasons were conducted under identical rules, with each team playing a home and away game against every other club for a total of 22 games per club per tournament. At the end of each half-season tournament, the top 8 teams in that tournament's regular season standings took part in the playoffs. The champions of Apertura and Clausura both qualified for the 2016–17 CONCACAF Champions League. As per the rules, if the same team won both tournaments, the runners-up with the best aggregate record would have qualified for the Champions League.

== Teams ==
A total of 12 teams contested the league, including 9 sides from the Clausura 2014 and 3 promoted from the 2014–15 Segunda División.

The 2015 season featured the addition of two extra sides from the Segunda División de Fútbol Salvadoreño. These were decided based on the quality of the club infrastructure, fan base and lastly whether they had secured the 100,000 dollar Primera División license

C.D. Atlético Marte were relegated to 2015–16 Segunda División the previous season.

The relegated team was replaced by the 2014–15 Segunda División playoffs promotion winner. Real Destroyer won the Clausura 2015 title, this led to take part of the promotion playoffs along with the Apertura 2014 champions side C.D. Guadalupano. Real Destroyer won the playoffs by the score of 5–2.

=== Promotion and relegation ===
Promoted from Segunda División de Fútbol Salvadoreño as of June, 2015.

- Champions: Real Destroyer

Relegated to Segunda División de Fútbol Salvadoreño as of June, 2015.

- Last Place: Atlético Marte (However, purchased new spot in the Primera División)

=== Franchises ===
The 2015–16 Primera División de Fútbol Profesional season featured the increase of two additional sides, Atlético Marte and C.D. Chalatenango. Both clubs were the only teams that nominated themselves (which included a 100,000 dollars payment) and as such were accepted.

=== Further Changes ===
Real Destroyer later sold their spot to C.D. Sonsonate for 75,000 dollars.

Firpo purchased the spot of Juventud Independiente after the end of the Apertura season. Although the club will play under their own colours, flags, jersey, stadium, coaching staff, directors and players, they were forced to be registered under the name and have the same points as Juventud Independiente.

== Stadia and locations ==
Location of teams in Apertura 2015/Clausura 2016

Team	Home city	Stadium	Capacity
C.D. Águila	San Miguel	Juan Francisco Barraza	10,000
Alianza F.C.	San Salvador	Estadio Cuscatlán	53,400
C.D. Atlético Marte	San Salvador	Estadio Cuscatlán	53,400
C.D. Chalatenango	Chalatenango	Estadio José Gregorio Martínez	15,000
C.D. Dragón	San Miguel	Juan Francisco Barraza	10,000
C.D. FAS	Santa Ana	Estadio Óscar Quiteño	15,000
C.D. Luis Ángel Firpo	Usulután	Estadio Sergio Torres	5,000
A.D. Isidro Metapán	Metapán	Estadio Jorge Calero Suárez	8,000
C.D. Juventud Independiente	San Juan Opico	Complejo Municipal	5,000
C.D. Pasaquina	Pasaquina	Estadio San Sebastián	5,000
Santa Tecla F.C.	Santa Tecla	Estadio Las Delicias	10,000
C.D. Sonsonate	Sonsonate	Estadio Anna Mercedes Campos	8,000
C.D. Universidad de El Salvador	San Salvador	Estadio Jorge "Mágico" González	32,000

1. ^{†} Information for Firpo is as of the time of their purchase of Juventud's spot at the end of the Apertura season.

=== Personnel and sponsoring ===
Team	Chairman	Head Coach	Kitmaker	Shirt sponsor
Águila	(El Salvador) Pedro Arieta	(Uruguay) Daniel Casanova	Joma	Tigo, Canal 4, Pepsi, Mister Donut
Alianza	(El Salvador) Lisandro Pohl Nuñez	(El Salvador) Jorge Rodríguez	Lotto	Sinai, Canal 4, Maseca, Los Rinconcitos, Pepsi, Tigo
Atlético Marte	(El Salvador) Hugo Carrillo	(El Salvador) Carlos "El Cacho" Meléndez	Galaxia	Pan Rosvil, Vive, La Curaçao, Foskrol, UFG
Chalatenango	(El Salvador) Rigoberto Mejía	(Guatemala) Carlos Mijangos	Milán	Lemus, Alcaldía Municipal de Chalatenango, Canal 4
Dragón	(El Salvador) Carlos Martinez Meza	(El Salvador) Omar Sevilla	Galaxia	Texas Casino, Hotel Real Centro, Canal 4, Las Perlitas, Tiendas Galo
FAS	(El Salvador) Rafael Villacorta	(Peru) Agustín Castillo	Mitre	Coop-1 de R.L., Alba Petróleos, Pilsener, Lays Chips, Tigo, Casino Montecarlo
Firpo	(El Salvador) Raul Galo	(El Salvador) Ramón Sánchez	Milán	Canal 4, Alcaldía de San Juan Opico, Ria
Isidro Metapán	(El Salvador) Rafael Morataya	(El Salvador) Misael Alfaro	Milán	Grupo Bimbo, Arroz San Pedro, Holcim, Pepsi, Canal 4
Juventud Independiente	(El Salvador) Romeo Barillas	(El Salvador) Jorge Abrego	Milán	Canal 4, Alcaldía de San Juan Opico, Ria
Pasaquina	(El Salvador) Oscar Ramirez	(El Salvador) Víctor Coreas	Milán	Megafrío, Aleve Extra Fuerte, Canal 4, Ria
Sonsonate	(El Salvador) Pedro Contreras	(Honduras) German Pérez	Milán	ProACES, Leche Salud, Caja de Crédito de Sonsonate, AlfaParf, Alcaldía de Sonsonate, Ferretería Santa Sofía
Santa Tecla	(El Salvador) Oscar Órtiz	(Argentina) Osvaldo Escudero	Milán	Rio Bingo, La Curaçao, Canal 21, Plaza Merliot, Pollo Indio, Petrox, Claro, Pepsi
UES	(El Salvador) Rufino Quezada	(El Salvador) William Renderos Iraheta	Galaxia	Alba Petróleos, MK, Canal 4

== Managerial changes ==
=== Before the start of the season ===
Team	Outgoing manager	Manner of departure	Date of vacancy	Replaced by	Date of appointment	Position in table
Águila	(Panama) Julio Dely Valdés	Contract finished	April 2015	(Brazil) Eraldo Correia	May 2015	6th (Clausura 2015)
Dragón	(El Salvador) Abel Blanco	Interim finished	April 2015	(El Salvador) Omar Sevilla	June 2015	10th (Clausura 2015)
Atlético Marte	(Argentina) Daniel Fernández	Contract finished	April 2015	(El Salvador) Carlos "El Cacho" Meléndez	June 2015	8th (Clausura 2015)
Pasaquina	(Argentina) Juan Andrés Sarulyte	Contract finished, not renewed	May 2015	(El Salvador) Víctor Coreas	June 2015	7th (Clausura 2015)
Juventud Independiente	(El Salvador) Juan Ramón Sánchez	Resigned, hired as El Salvador under 23	May 2015	(El Salvador) Jorge Abrego	June 2015	3rd (Clausura 2015)
Chalatenango	(El Salvador) Ricardo Serrano	Moved to become assistant coach	June 2015	(Argentina) Juan Andrés Sarulyte	June 2015	Newly Promoted

=== During the Apertura season ===
Team	Outgoing manager	Manner of departure	Date of vacancy	Replaced by	Date of appointment	Position in table
Sonsonate	(Honduras) German Pérez	Resigned	August 2015	(El Salvador) Ennio Mendoza and Mario Elias Guevara (Caretaker)	August 2015	12th (Apertura 2015)
Sonsonate	(El Salvador) Ennio Mendoza and Mario Elias Guevara	Caretaker tenure finished, moved back to assistant and reserve	August 2015	(Chile) Héctor Jara	August 2015	12th (Apertura 2015)
Chalatenango	(Argentina) Juan Andrés Sarulyte	Sacked	August 2015	(El Salvador) Ricardo Serrano	August 2015	11th (Apertura 2015)
UES	(El Salvador) William Renderos Iraheta	Sacked	September 2015	(El Salvador) Efrain Burgos	September 2015	12th (Apertura 2015)
Atlético Marte	(El Salvador) Carlos "El Cacho" Meléndez	Sacked	September 2015	(El Salvador) Douglas Vidal Jiménez	September 2015	11th (Apertura 2015)
Sonsonate	(Chile) Héctor Jara	Sacked	October 2015	(El Salvador) Edwin Portillo	October 2015	9th (Apertura 2015)

=== Between Apertura and Clausura seasons ===
Team	Outgoing manager	Manner of departure	Date of vacancy	Replaced by	Date of appointment	Position in table
Águila	(Brazil) Eraldo Correia	Contract finished	December 2015	(El Salvador) Juan Ramón Sánchez	December 2015	2nd (Apertura 2015)
Pasaquina	(El Salvador) Víctor Coreas	Resigned for personal reason	December 2015	(Paraguay) Hugo Ovelar	December 2015	7th (Apertura 2015)
Chalatenango	(El Salvador) Ricardo Serrano	Resigned	December 2015	(El Salvador) Nelson Mauricio Ancheta	December 2015	6th (Apertura 2015)
FAS	(Peru) Agustín Castillo	Contract finished	December 2015	(Argentina) Carlos Martinez Sequeira	December 2015	5th (Apertura 2015)
UES	(El Salvador) Efrain Burgos	Resigned	December 2015	(El Salvador) Edgar "Kiko" Henríquez	December 2015	12th (Apertura 2015)

=== During the Clausura season ===
Team	Outgoing manager	Manner of departure	Date of vacancy	Replaced by	Date of appointment	Position in table
Chalatenango	(El Salvador) Nelson Mauricio Ancheta	Resigned due to conflict with president	January 2016	(El Salvador) Ricardo Serrano	January 2016	6th (Clausura 2016)
Atlético Marte	(El Salvador) Douglas Vidal Jiménez	Sacked	February 2016	(Argentina) Juan Andrés Sarulyte	February 2016	12th (Clausura 2016)
Alianza	(Uruguay) Rubén Alonso	Resigned	February 2016	(El Salvador) (El Salvador) Milton Meléndez and Juan Carlos Serrano (Caretaker)	February 2016	9th (Clausura 2016)
Alianza	(El Salvador) (El Salvador) Milton Meléndez and Juan Carlos Serrano (Caretaker)	End of Caretaker role	February 2016	(Argentina) Daniel Fernandez	February 2016	9th (Clausura 2016)
Firpo	(El Salvador) Alvaro Misael Alfaro	Resignation	March 2016	(El Salvador) Jose Mario Martinez	March 2016	3rd(Clausura 2016)
Atlético Marte	(Argentina) Juan Andrés Sarulyte	Sacked	March 2016	(El Salvador) Efrain Burgos	March 2016	12th (Clausura 2016)
C.D. FAS	(Argentina) Carlos Martinez Sequeira	Mutual termination	March 2016	(Argentina) Roberto Gamarra	March 2016	9th (Clausura 2016)
C.D. Sonsonate	(El Salvador) Edwin Portillo	Mutual termination	April 2016	(El Salvador) William Renderos Iraheta	April 2016	8th (Clausura 2016)
C.D. Sonsonate	(El Salvador) William Renderos Iraheta	Resigned	April 2016	(El Salvador) Ennio Mendoza and Mario Elias Guevara (Caretaker)	April 2016	10th (Clausura 2016)

== Apertura ==
=== League table ===
Pos	Team	Pld	W	D	L	GF	GA	GD	Pts	Qualification or relegation
1	Isidro Metapán	22	11	6	5	42	16	+26	39	Qualification to playoffs
2	Águila	22	10	9	3	32	21	+11	39	Qualification to playoffs
3	Alianza	22	10	8	4	39	27	+12	38	Qualification to playoffs
4	Santa Tecla	22	9	7	6	47	34	+13	34	Qualification to playoffs
5	FAS	22	9	7	6	28	28	0	34	Qualification to playoffs
6	Chalatenango	22	8	6	8	23	27	−4	30	Qualification to playoffs
7	Pasaquina	22	6	10	6	27	27	0	28	Qualification to playoffs
8	Dragón	22	6	9	7	26	25	+1	27	Qualification to playoffs
9	Juventud Independiente	22	5	7	10	20	33	−13	22	
10	Sonsonate	22	4	8	10	22	38	−16	20	
11	Atlético Marte	22	3	10	9	16	29	−13	19	
12	UES	22	3	9	10	13	30	−17	18	

Updated to match(es) played on November 29, 2015. Source:
Rules for classification: 1) points; 2) goal difference; 3) number of goals scored.

==== Positions by round ====
This table lists the positions of teams after each week of matches. In order to preserve the chronological evolution, any postponed matches are not included to the round at which they were originally scheduled, but added to the full round they were played immediately afterwards. For example, if a match is scheduled for matchday 3, but then postponed and played between days 6 and 7, it will be added to the standings for day 6.

Team ╲ Round	1	2	3	4	5	6	7	8	9	10	11	12	13	14	15	16	17	18	19	20	21	22
Isidro Metapán	4=	8	9	10	7	8	9	10	11	9	4	4	4	4	4	3	3	3	3	1	1	1
Águila	3	1	1	1	2	2	2	2	4	2	2	2	2	1	1	1	1	1	1	2	2	2
Alianza	4=	3	5	3	3	3	4	4	3	4	3	3	3	3	3	5	5	4	4	4	3	3
Santa Tecla	1	6	2	5	8	9	5	5	7	6	6	7	7	6	5	7	7	7	5	5	5	4
FAS	10	5	3	2	1	1	1	1	1	1	1	1	1	2	2	2	2	2	2	3	4	5
Chalatenango	4=	10	10	11	11	11	11	12	8=	7	8	8	8	8	7	8	6	6	7	7	7	6
Pasaquina	4=	4	6	8	9	7	8	9	6	5	7	5	5	7	6	4	4	5	6	6	6	7
Dragón	11	7	7	4	4	4	3	3	2	3	5	6	6	5	8	6	8	8	8	8	8	8
Juventud Independiente	12	12	8	6	5	5	6	6	10	10	11	11	10	10	11	11	10	10	10	10	9	9
Sonsonate	4=	11	12	12	12	12	12	8	5	8	9	9	9	9	10	9	9	9	9	9	10	10
Atlético Marte	2	2	4	7	6	6	7	7	8=	11	10	10	11	11	9	10	11	11	11	11	11	11
UES	4=	9	11	9	10	10	10	11	12	12	12	12	12	12	12	12	12	12	12	12	12	12

Leader and qualification to playoffs
Qualification to playoffs

=== Results ===
Home \ Away	ÁGU	ALI	ATM	CHA	DRA	FAS	MET	JUV	PAS	STE	SON	UES
Águila		2–2	1–0	2–2	1–0	1–1	1–0	1–0	2–2	2–1	3–0	1–0
Alianza	1–1		0–0	1–0	1–1	3–0	1–2	2–0	2–0	0–0	4–1	1–1
Atlético Marte	1–1	1–1		2–0	1–0	0–3	0–0	0–1	1–2	2–2	0–0	0–2
Chalatenango	3–1	0–0	2–0		2–1	1–0	1–1	2–0	0–0	2–0	0–0	2–1
Dragón	0–0	0–3	5–1	2–0		2–2	0–0	2–0	0–0	2–1	1–2	1–1
C.D. FAS	2–1	3–1	2–3	0–1	1–0		0–0	1–1	2–1	0–5	1–1	1–0
Isidro Metapán	1–1	3–4	3–1	3–1	3–1	2–3		5–0	2–0	5–0	4–0	0–1
Juventud Independiente	1–3	0–3	0–0	2–0	1–1	1–3	1–0		3–2	2–2	2–0	2–2
Pasaquina	1–1	3–0	0–0	3–2	0–1	1–1	0–0	3–1		2–2	1–1	1–1
Santa Tecla	2–1	5–2	2–2	6–1	2–2	2–0	0–3	2–0	4–2		4–2	4–0
Sonsonate	0–3	3–4	2–1	2–1	2–2	1–2	0–1	1–1	0–1	1–1		2–0
C.D. Universidad de El Salvador	1–2	1–3	0–0	0–0	1–2	0–0	0–4	1–1	1–2	1–0	1–1	

Legend: Blue = home team win; Yellow = draw; Red = away team win.

The home team is listed in the left-hand column.
Colours: Blue = home team win; Yellow = draw; Red = away team win.

==== Scoring ====
- First goal of the season: (El Salvador) Ivan Mancia for Santa Tecla against Juventud Independiente, 21 minutes (August 1, 2015)
- First goal by a foreign player: (Colombia) Neymer Miranda for Pasaquina against Sonsonate, 57 minutes (August 1, 2015)
- Fastest goal in a match: 2 minutes
  - (El Salvador) Elman Rivas for UES against Santa Tecla (August 15, 2015)
  - (El Salvador) José Barahona for Juventud Independiente against Águila (September 27, 2015)
- Goal scored at the latest point in a match: 90+4 minutes
  - (El Salvador) Cristian Cisneros for Isidro Metapán against Chalatenango (August 1, 2015)
- First penalty Kick of the season: (Panama) Nicolás Muñoz for Águila against Dragón, 89 minutes (August 3, 2015)
- Widest winning margin: 5 goals
  - Isidro Metapán 5–0 Juventud Independiente (September 30, 2015)
  - Isidro Metapán 5–0 Santa Tecla (October 24, 2015)
  - Santa Tecla 6–1 Chalatenango (November 14, 2015)
  - FAS 0–5 Santa Tecla (November 22, 2015)
- First hat-trick of the season: (El Salvador) Williams Reyes for Águila against Juventud Independiente (September 27, 2015)
- First own goal of the season: (El Salvador) Mario Martínez (Atlético Marte) for Dragón (August 16, 2015)
- Most goals in a match: 7 goals
  - Isidro Metapán 3–4 Alianza (August 9, 2015)
  - Sonsonate 3–4 Alianza (September 26, 2015)
  - Santa Tecla 5–2 Alianza (September 30, 2015)
  - Santa Tecla 6–1 Chalatenango (November 14, 2015)
- Most goals by one team in a match: 6 goals
  - Santa Tecla 6–1 Chalatenango (November 14, 2015)
- Most goals in one half by one team: 4 goals
  - Santa Tecla 5–2(1–2) Alianza (2nd half, September 30, 2015)
- Most goals scored by losing team: 3 goals
  - Isidro Metapán 3–4 Alianza (August 9, 2015)
  - Sonsonate 3–4 Alianza (September 26, 2015)
- Most goals by one player in a single match: 3 goals
  - (El Salvador) Williams Reyes for Águila against Juventud Independiente (September 27, 2015)
  - (El Salvador) David Rugamas for Isidro Metapán against Juventud Independiente (October 1, 2015)
  - (El Salvador) Irvin Herrera for Santa Tecla against Chalatenango (November 14, 2015)
  - (Colombia) Luis Hinestroza for Santa Tecla against FAS (November 22, 2015)

==== Club ====
- Most clean sheets: Isidro Metapán
  - 11
- Fewest clean sheets: Sonsonate
  - 3
- Best Home record during the Apertura season: Santa Tecla
  - 26 out of 33 points (8 wins, 2 draws, and 1 loss)
- Worst Home record during the Apertura season: UES
  - 8 out of 33 points (1 win, 5 draws, and 5 losses)
- Best Away record during the Apertura season: Alianza
  - 18 out of 33 points (5 wins, 3 draws, and 3 losses)
- Worst Away record during the Apertura season: Juventud Independiente
  - 6 out of 33 points (1 win, 3 draws, and 7 losses)
- Highest scoring team: Santa Tecla
  - 47 goals
- Lowest scoring team: UES
  - 13 goals

==== Discipline ====
- First yellow card of the season: (El Salvador) Álvaro Guardado for Juventud Independiente against Santa Tecla, 47 minutes (August 1, 2015)
- First red card of the season: (El Salvador) William Maldonado for Santa Tecla against Juventud Independiente, 78 minutes (August 1, 2015)
- Most yellow cards by a player: 8
  - (El Salvador) Rudy Valencia (Alianza)
  - (Colombia) Jimmy Valoyes (Águila)
- Most red cards by a player: 3
  - (El Salvador) Bladimir Osorio (Dragón)

=== Attendances ===
Ranked from highest to lowest average attendance.

Pos	Team	Total	High	Low	Average	Change
1	Sonsonate	59,120	8,665	0	5,001	n/a
2	Alianza	51,673	12,574	0	4,697	n/a
3	Chalatenango	40,605	0	0	3,691	n/a
4	Águila	30,025	0	0	2,729	n/a
5	FAS	25,779	8,683	0	2,343	n/a
6	Isidro Metapán	9,484	0	0	948	n/a
7	Santa Tecla	11,737	0	0	1,067	n/a
8	Dragón	4,490	0	0	1,496	n/a
9	Pasaquina	8,129	0	0	812	n/a
10	Juventud Independiente	6,298	0	184	572	n/a
11	Atlético Marte	7,127	0	107	890	n/a
12	UES	4,234	0	0	529	n/a
	League total	258,701	12,574	107	0	n/a

Source: http://www.laprensagrafica.com/2015/11/28/sonsonate-terminara-como-lider-en-taquillas

=== Top goalscorers ===
Rank	Player	Team	Goals
1	(El Salvador) David Rugamas	Isidro Metapán	12
2	(El Salvador) Williams Reyes	Águila	11
3	(Colombia) Bladimir Díaz	Chalatenango	10
3	(Brazil) Ricardinho	Santa Tecla	10
3	(El Salvador) Irvin Herrera	Santa Tecla	10
6	(Brazil) Josimar	FAS	9
6	(Panama) Nicolás Muñoz	Águila	9
6	(El Salvador) Rodolfo Zelaya	Alianza	9
9	(Saint Kitts and Nevis) Devaughn Elliott	Pasaquina	8
9	(El Salvador) Josué Flores	Isidro Metapán	8

==== Hat-tricks ====
Player	For	Against	Result	Date
(El Salvador) Williams Reyes	Águila	Juventud Independiente	3–1	September 27, 2015
(El Salvador) David Rugamas	Isidro Metapán	Juventud Independiente	5–0	October 1, 2015
(El Salvador) Irvin Herrera	Santa Tecla	Chalatenango	6–1	November 14, 2015
(Colombia) Luis Hinestroza	Santa Tecla	FAS	5–0	November 22, 2015

=== Playoffs ===
Quarterfinals
6	Chalatenango	1	2	3
3	Alianza	1	3	4
7	Pasaquina	0	0	0
2	Águila	1	1	2
5	FAS	0	2	2
4	Santa Tecla	0	1	1
8	Dragón	1	0	1
1	Isidro Metapán (s)	0	1	1

Semifinals
3	Alianza	1	2	3
2	Águila	0	2	2
5	FAS	2	0	2
1	Isidro Metapán	1	0	1

Finals
3	Alianza	1
5	FAS	0

==== Quarter-finals ====
Team 1	Agg.	Team 2	1st leg	2nd leg
Dragón	1–1 (s)	Isidro Metapán	1–0	0–1
Pasaquina	0–2	Águila	0–1	0–1
Chalatenango	3–4	Alianza	1–1	2–3
Santa Tecla	1–2	FAS	0–0	1–2

1. ^{†} Order of legs reversed.

===== First leg =====
December 2, 2015
15:00 UTC−6

Pasaquina	0–1	Águila
		Nicolás Muñoz 10'

Estadio San Sebastián, Pasaquina
Attendance: 2,274
Referee: Elmer Martínez

December 2, 2015
19:00 UTC−6

Chalatenango	1–1	Alianza
Bladimir Díaz 22'; Ricardo Figueroa (red card) 47'		Jonathan Philippe 6'

Estadio José Gregorio Martínez, Chalatenango
Attendance: 5,008
Referee: Jaime Carpio Mejía

December 2, 2015
19:00 UTC−6

FAS	0–0	Santa Tecla

Estadio Óscar Quiteño, Santa Ana
Attendance: 2,290
Referee: Jaime Herrera

December 3, 2015
14:30 UTC−6

Dragón	1–0	Isidro Metapán
Jackson de Oliveira 33'

Juan Francisco Barraza, San Miguel
Referee: Edenílson Ventura Santos

===== Second leg =====
December 5, 2015
18:00 UTC−6

Isidro Metapán	1–0	Dragón
David Rugamas 80'

Estadio Jorge Calero Suárez, Metapán
Referee: Ismael Cornejo

1–1 on aggregate. Isidro Metapán advanced as the higher seeded team.

December 5, 2015
19:00 UTC−6

Águila	1–0	Pasaquina
Nicolás Muñoz 4'		Juan José Romero (red card) 44'

Juan Francisco Barraza, San Miguel
Attendance: 3,532
Referee: Jaime Herrera

Águila won 2–0 on aggregate.

December 6, 2015
15:15 UTC−6

Alianza	3–2	Chalatenango
Oscar Guerrero 73'; Herbert Sosa 76'; Portillo 86'		Bladimir Díaz 14', (red card) 89'; Henry Reyes 47'

Estadio Cuscatlán, San Salvador
Attendance: 8,678
Referee: Elmer Bonilla Ruíz

Alianza won 4–3 on aggregate.

December 6, 2015
16:00 UTC−6

Santa Tecla	1–2	FAS
Irvin Herrera 16'		Walter Martínez 18', 55'; Cristian Álvarez (red card) 64'

Estadio Las Delicias, Santa Tecla
Attendance: 3,414
Referee: Germán Martínez Miranda

FAS won 2–1 on aggregate.

==== Semifinals ====
Team 1	Agg.	Team 2	1st leg	2nd leg
FAS	2–1	Isidro Metapán	2–1	0–0
Alianza	3–2	Águila	1–0	2–2

===== First leg =====
December 9, 2015
19:00 UTC−6

FAS	2–1	Isidro Metapán
Walter Martínez 39', 75'		Paolo Suárez 82'

Estadio Óscar Quiteño, Santa Ana
Attendance: 7,376
Referee: Jaime Carpio Mejía

December 10, 2015
19:30 UTC−6

Alianza	1–0	Águila
Jonathan Philippe 44' (pen.)

Estadio Cuscatlán, San Salvador
Attendance: 19,150
Referee: Edenílson Ventura Santos

===== Second leg =====
December 12, 2015
18:00 UTC−6

Isidro Metapán	0–0	FAS
Henry Hernández (red card) 78'

Estadio Jorge Calero Suárez, Metapán

FAS won 2–1 on aggregate.

December 12, 2015
19:30 UTC−6

Águila	2–2	Alianza
Nicolás Muñoz 50' (pen.); Deris Umanzor 67'		Portillo 18'; Rodolfo Zelaya 70'

Juan Francisco Barraza, San Miguel
Attendance: 9,568
Referee: Ismael Cornejo

Alianza won 3–2 on aggregate.

==== Final ====
December 20, 2015
15:00 UTC−6

Alianza	1–0	FAS
Ramón Martínez 57'

Estadio Cuscatlán, San Salvador
Attendance: 27,998
Referee: Jaime Herrera

Alianza F.C.
GK	25	(El Salvador) Óscar Arroyo
DF	5	(Colombia) Iván Garrido
DF	6	(El Salvador) Ramón Martínez
DF	4	(El Salvador) Andrés Flores Jaco
DF	15	(El Salvador) Danny Torres
MF	7	(El Salvador) Rudy Valencia
MF	8	(El Salvador) Rodrigo Rivera	(yellow card) 41'	(substituted off) 83'
MF	42	(El Salvador) Tony Roque		(substituted off) 46'
MF	11	(El Salvador) Juan Carlos Portillo
FW	22	(El Salvador) Rodolfo Zelaya		(substituted off) 21'
FW	3	(Argentina) Jonathan Philippe	(yellow card) 90+3'
Substitutes:
FW	9	(El Salvador) David Díaz	(yellow card) 88'	(substituted on) 21'
FW	10	(Colombia) Oscar Guerrero		(substituted on) 46'
MF	27	(El Salvador) Isaac Portillo		(substituted on) 83'
Manager:
(Uruguay) Rubén Alonso

C.D. FAS
GK	1	(El Salvador) Luis Contreras		(substituted off) 59'
DF	3	(El Salvador) Xavier García
DF	12	(El Salvador) Alexander Méndoza
DF	26	(El Salvador) Moisés Mejía	(yellow card) 36'
DF	6	(El Salvador) Miguel Lemus
MF	7	(El Salvador) Jorge Morán
MF	5	(El Salvador) Néstor Renderos
MF	8	(El Salvador) Cristian Álvarez	(yellow card) 68'
MF	57	(El Salvador) Christian Rodriguez	(yellow card) 35'	(substituted off) 57'
FW	9	(El Salvador) José Peña	(yellow card) 54'	(substituted off) 70'
FW	15	(Honduras) Walter Martínez
Substitutes:
FW	11	(El Salvador) Rafael Burgos		(substituted on) 57'
GK	25	(El Salvador) Adolfo Menéndez Jr.		(substituted on) 59'
FW	20	(Brazil) Josimar Moreira		(substituted on) 70'
Manager:
(Peru) Agustín Castillo

Apertura 2015 champions

11th title

== Clausura ==
Results and statistics listed in the Clausura season for Juventud Independiente are actually those of Firpo, which purchased the spot at the end of the Apertura season but was forced to register as Juventud.

=== League table ===
Pos	Team	Pld	W	D	L	GF	GA	GD	Pts	Qualification or relegation
1	Águila	22	13	7	2	29	12	+17	46	Qualification for the playoffs
2	Santa Tecla	22	12	9	1	45	14	+31	45	Qualification for the playoffs
3	Juventud Independiente	22	12	5	5	31	22	+9	41	Qualification for the playoffs
4	Alianza	22	8	10	4	33	18	+15	34	Qualification for the playoffs
5	Isidro Metapán	22	6	11	5	27	26	+1	29	Qualification for the playoffs
6	Dragón	22	7	7	8	24	23	+1	28	Qualification for the playoffs
7	Pasaquina	22	7	5	10	28	37	−9	26	Qualification for the playoffs
8	Chalatenango	22	6	7	9	28	39	−11	25	Qualification for the playoffs
9	UES	22	8	1	13	21	32	−11	25	
10	Sonsonate	22	6	5	11	24	35	−11	23	
11	FAS	22	5	6	11	20	26	−6	21	
12	Atlético Marte	22	3	5	14	17	43	−26	14	

Updated to match(es) played on February 28, 2016. Source: primerafutboles.com
Rules for classification: 1) points; 2) goal difference; 3) number of goals scored.

==== Positions by round ====
This table lists the positions of teams after each week of matches. In order to preserve the chronological evolution, any postponed matches are not included to the round at which they were originally scheduled, but added to the full round they were played immediately afterwards. For example, if a match is scheduled for matchday 3, but then postponed and played between days 6 and 7, it will be added to the standings for day 6.

Team ╲ Round	1	2	3	4	5	6	7	8	9	10	11	12	13	14	15	16	17	18	19	20	21	22
Águila	3	1	1	2	2	1									1	2	2	1	2	2	2	1
Juventud Independiente	8=	3	2	1	1	2									3	3	3	3	3	3	3	3
Santa Tecla	8=	8	10	7	5	3									2	1	1	2	1	1	1	2
Sonsonate	4=	9	6	9	7	4									9	9	9	9	8	9	9	10
Chalatenango	6=	5	4	4	3	5									6	5	4	6	6	7	8	8
Dragón	11	10	7	8	9	6									4	6	6	5	5	5	5	6
FAS	2	6	8	5	4	7									8	8	8	8	9	11	11	11
Pasaquina	4=	4	3	3	6	8									10	10	10	11	10	8	10	7
Alianza	1	2	5	6	8	9									5	4	5	4	4	4	4	4
Isidro Metapán	6=	7	9	10	10	10									7	7	7	7	7	6	6	5
UES	12	12	12	12	12	11									11	11	11	10	11	10	7	9
Atlético Marte	10	11	11	11	11	12									12	12	12	12	12	12	12	12

Leader and qualification to playoffs
Qualification to playoffs

=== Results ===
Home \ Away	ÁGU	ALI	ATM	CHA	DRA	FAS	MET	JUV	PAS	STE	SON	UES
Águila		0–0	3–1	3–0	1–0	1–0	0–0	2–0	1–0	1–1	3–1	1–0
Alianza	2–0		6–1	2–2	1–0	1–0	0–0	0–0	1–1	0–0	3–2	3–0
Atlético Marte	0–1	0–4		1–2	0–3	0–2	3–2	1–2	1–1	0–2	0–2	2–0
Chalatenango	0–0	2–1	0–0		2–2	1–1	1–1	2–1	1–0	2–2	1–2	0–1
Dragón	0–3	1–1	1–1	3–2		2–0	1–1	0–1	3–0	0–0	1–0	2–0
C.D. FAS	1–1	0–0	2–1	1–3	0–1		3–3	1–2	1–2	2–3	4–0	1–0
Isidro Metapán	2–2	1–1	0–0	2–1	1–0	1–0		1–1	2–1	2–2	1–0	2–0
Juventud Independiente	0–0	2–1	2–0	4–1	2–2	3–0	3–2		2–1	0–3	1–0	2–1
Pasaquina	0–1	2–2	4–1	1–3	3–1	1–0	1–0	0–1		1–1	3–3	2–0
Santa Tecla	2–0	2–1	1–1	4–0	2–1	0–0	3–1	0–0	8–0		0–1	5–0
Sonsonate	1–2	1–1	2–3	3–2	0–0	0–1	1–1	2–1	1–2	1–1		1–0
C.D. Universidad de El Salvador	1–3	0–2	1–0	4–0	2–0	0–0	2–1	2–1	3–2	0–2	4–0	

Legend: Blue = home team win; Yellow = draw; Red = away team win.

Updated to games played on February 28, 2016.
The home team is listed in the left-hand column.
Colours: Blue = home team win; Yellow = draw; Red = away team win.

==== Scoring ====
- First goal of the season: (El Salvador) Marcos Rodríguez for Sonsonate against Pasaquina, 15 minutes (January 16, 2016)
- First goal by a foreign player: (Colombia) Oscar Móvil for Sonsonate against Pasaquina, 52 minutes (January 16, 2016)
- Fastest goal in a match: 6 minutes
  - (Colombia) Luis Hinestroza for Santa Tecla F.C. against Pasaquina (February 13, 2016)
- Goal scored at the latest point in a match: 90+5 minutes
  - (El Salvador) Meme González (pen.) for Dragón against Atlético Marte (January 31, 2016)
- First penalty Kick of the season: (El Salvador) Erick Molina for Atlético Marte against FAS, 76 minutes (January 17, 2016)
- Widest winning margin: 8 goals
  - Santa Tecla F.C. 8–0 Pasaquina (February 13, 2016)
- First hat-trick of the season: (El Salvador) Williams Reyes for Juventud Independiente against FAS (January 23, 2016)
- First own goal of the season: (El Salvador) Miguel Solís (Chalatenango) for Juventud Independiente, 12 minutes (January 31, 2016)
- Most goals in a match: 8 goals
  - Santa Tecla F.C. 8–0 Pasaquina (February 13, 2016)
- Most goals by one team in a match: 8 goals
  - Santa Tecla F.C. 8–0 Pasaquina (February 13, 2016)
- Most goals in one half by one team: 5 goals
  - Santa Tecla F.C. 8–0 Pasaquina (1st half, February 13, 2016)
- Most goals scored by losing team: 2 goals
  - Dragón 3–2 Chalatenango (February 10, 2016)
- Most goals by one player in a single match: 3 goals
  - (El Salvador) Williams Reyes for Juventud Independiente against FAS (January 23, 2016)

==== Club ====
- Most clean sheets: C.D. Águila
  - 12
- Fewest clean sheets: Atlético Marte
  - 3
- Best Home record during the Clausura season: C.D. Águila
  - 27 out of 33 points (8 wins, 3 draws, and 0 loss)
- Worst Home record during the Clausura season: Atlético Marte
  - 7 out of 33 points (2 wins, 1 draw, and 8 losses)
- Best Away record during the Clausura season: Santa Tecla F.C.
  - 21 out of 33 points (5 wins, 6 draws, and 0 losses)
- Worst Away record during the Clausura season: UES
  - 3 out of 33 points (1 win, 0 draws, and 10 losses)
- Highest scoring team: Santa Tecla F.C.
  - 45 goals
- Lowest scoring team: Atlético Marte
  - 16 goals

==== Discipline ====
- First yellow card of the season: (Colombia) Oscar Móvil for Sonsonate against Pasaquina, 48 minutes (January 16, 2016)
- First red card of the season: (El Salvador) Mario Martínez for Sonsonate against Pasaquina, 72 minutes (January 16, 2016)
- Most yellow cards by a player: TBD
  - TBD (TBD)
- Most red cards by a player: TBD
  - TBD (TBD)
- Most yellow cards by a club: 75
  - Atletico Marte
- Most red cards by a club: '8
  - C.D. FAS and C.D. Pasaquina

=== Attendances ===
Pos	Team	Total	High	Low	Average	Change
1	Alianza	48,871	8,326	0	0	n/a
2	Sonsonate	39,404	8,019	0	0	n/a
3	Chalatenango	28,345	0	0	0	n/a
4	Águila	24,790	0	0	0	n/a
5	UES	21,416	0	179	0	n/a
6	FAS	14,617	0	0	0	n/a
7	Juventud Independiente	10,318	0	0	0	n/a
8	Santa Tecla	9,964	0	0	0	n/a
9	Atlético Marte	8,849	0	192	0	n/a
10	Pasaquina	6,701	0	0	0	n/a
11	Dragón	4,759	0	0	0	n/a
12	Isidro Metapán	4,091	0	0	0	n/a
	League total	0	0	0	0	n/a

=== Top goalscorers ===
Rank	Player	Team	Goals
1	(Colombia) Bladimir Díaz	C.D. Chalatenango	15
2	(Panama) (El Salvador) Nicolás Muñoz	C.D. Águila	13
3	(El Salvador) Williams Reyes	Juventud Independiente	11
4	(Argentina) Allan Murialdo	C.D. Dragón	9
5	(Brazil) Ricardinho	Santa Tecla F.C.	8
6	(Colombia) Oscar Guerrero	Alianza F.C.	8
7	(El Salvador) José Peña	A.D. Isidro Metapán	8
8	(El Salvador) Herbert Sosa	Alianza F.C.	8
9	(Brazil) Jackson de Oliveira	C.D. Dragón	7
10	(El Salvador) Gerson Mayen	Santa Tecla F.C.	7

==== Hat-tricks ====
Player	For	Against	Result	Date
(El Salvador) Williams Reyes	Juventud Independiente	FAS	3–0	January 23, 2016
(El Salvador) William Maldonado	Santa Tecla F.C.	UES	5–0	2016

=== Playoffs ===
Quarterfinals
6	Dragón	3	0	3
3	Juventud Independiente	0	2	2
7	Pasaquina	2	0	2
2	Santa Tecla	2	4	6
5	Isidro Metapán	0	0	0
4	Alianza	0	1	1
8	Chalatenango	0	1	1
1	Águila	4	0	4

Semifinals
6	Dragón	0	1	1
2	Santa Tecla	0	0	0
4	Alianza	0	1	1
1	Águila	1	2	3

Finals
6	Dragón	1
1	Águila	0

==== Quarter-finals ====
Team 1	Agg.	Team 2	1st leg	2nd leg
Dragón	3–2	Juventud Independiente	3–0	0–2
Pasaquina	2–6	Santa Tecla	2–2	0–4
Chalatenango	1–4	Águila	0–4	1–0
Isidro Metapán	0–1	Alianza	0–0	0–1

1. ^{†} Order of legs reversed.

===== First leg =====
May 11, 2016
14:30 UTC−6

Pasaquina	2–2	Santa Tecla
Manuel Lucero 24'; Gustavo Guerreño 56'		Lester Blanco 7'; Gerson Mayen 41' (pen.)

Estadio San Sebastián, Pasaquina
Attendance: 667
Referee: Marlón Mejía

May 11, 2016
17:00 UTC−6

Dragón	3–0	Juventud Independiente
Christian Portillo 11'; Óscar Jiménez 22' (o.g.); Jackson de Oliveira 48'

Juan Francisco Barraza, San Miguel
Referee: Ismael Cornejo

May 11, 2016
19:00 UTC−6

Chalatenango	0–4	Águila
		Héctor Ramos 9' 10'; Nicolás Muñoz 51' 90'

Estadio José Gregorio Martínez, Chalatenango
Attendance: 4, 426
Referee: Jaime Carpio

May 11, 2016
19:00 UTC−6

Isidro Metapán	0–0	Alianza

Estadio Jorge Calero Suárez, Metapán
Referee: Joel Aguilar Chicas

===== Second leg =====
May 15, 2016
18:00 UTC−6

Juventud Independiente	2–0	Dragón
Marvin Ramos 56'; Marcelo Posadas 67' (o.g.)

Estadio Sergio Torres,
Usulután

Dragón won 3–2 on aggregate.

May 5, 2016
19:00 UTC−6

Águila	0–1	Chalatenango
		Bladimir Díaz 71'

Juan Francisco Barraza, San Miguel
Attendance: 2,790

Águila won 4–1 on aggregate.

May 5, 2016
15:15 UTC−6

Alianza	1–0	Isidro Metapán
Élmer Abarca 2'

Estadio Cuscatlán, San Salvador
Attendance: 9,011

Alianza won 1–0 on aggregate.

May 6, 2016
16:00 UTC−6

Santa Tecla	4–0	Pasaquina
Ivan Mancia 20'; Gerson Mayen 33'; Marlón Cornejo 56'; Gilberto Baires 59'

Estadio Las Delicias, Santa Tecla
Attendance: 714

Santa Tecla won 6–2 on aggregate.

==== Semi-finals ====
Team 1	Agg.	Team 2	1st leg	2nd leg
Alianza	1–3	Águila	1–0	1–2
Santa Tecla	0–1	Dragón	0–0	0–1

===== First leg =====
May 18, 2016
14:00 UTC−6

Dragón	0–0	Santa Tecla
Jackson de Oliveira (red card) 69'

Juan Francisco Barraza, San Miguel

May 19, 2016
19:30 UTC−6

Alianza	0–1	Águila
		Héctor Ramos 94'

Estadio Cuscatlán, San Salvador

===== Second leg =====
May 21, 2016
18:00 UTC−6

Santa Tecla	0–1	Dragón
		Luis Hernández 76'

Estadio Las Delicias, Santa Tecla

Dragón won 1–0 on aggregate.

May 22, 2016
19:30 UTC−6

Águila	2–1	Alianza
Nicolás Muñoz 55' 62' (pen.)		Herbert Sosa 36' (pen.)

Juan Francisco Barraza, San Miguel

Águila won 3–1 on aggregate.

==== Final ====
May 29, 2016
15:00 UTC−6

Águila	0–1	Dragón
		Wilman Torres 38'

Estadio Cuscatlán, San Salvador
Attendance: 28, 911
Referee: Jaime Carpio

C.D. Águila
GK	22	(El Salvador) Benji Villalobos
DF	16	(El Salvador) Ibsen Castro	(substituted off) 52'
DF	3	(Colombia) Jimmy Valoyes
DF	2	(El Salvador) Henry Romero
DF	13	(El Salvador) Deris Umanzor
MF	17	(El Salvador) René Gómez	(substituted off) 59'
MF	12	(El Salvador) Santos Ortíz
MF	20	(El Salvador) Álvaro Lizama	(yellow card) 19'
MF	51	(El Salvador) Erick Villalobos	(substituted off) 71'
FW	23	(Puerto Rico) Héctor Ramos	(yellow card) 56'
FW	19	(Panama) Nicolás Muñoz
Substitutes:
MF	21	(El Salvador) Marlon Trejo		(substituted on) 52'
FW	4	(El Salvador) Fredy Epinoza	(substituted on) 59'
FW	8	(El Salvador) Irvin Valdez		(substituted on) 71'
Manager:
(El Salvador) Juan Ramón Sánchez

C.D. Dragón
GK	22	(El Salvador) Manuel González	(yellow card) 56'
DF	2	(El Salvador) Luis Hernández	(yellow card) 36'	(substituted off) 61'
DF	19	(El Salvador) Bladimir Osorio	(yellow card) 37'
DF	26	(El Salvador) Marcelo Posadas
DF	29	(El Salvador) Herbert Ulloa
MF	20	(El Salvador) Cristian Portillo
MF	6	(El Salvador) Jefferson Polio	(substituted off) 79'
MF	21	(El Salvador) Blas Lizama	(yellow card) 68'
MF	17	(El Salvador) Wilman Torres
FW	11	(Argentina) Allan Murialdo	(substituted off) 75'
FW	8	(Brazil) Jackson de Oliveira
Substitutes:
DF	3	(El Salvador) Leonel Guevara		(substituted on) 61'
MF	55	(El Salvador) Axel López		(substituted on) 75'
DF	27	(El Salvador) Sergio Cruz		(substituted on) 79'
Manager:
(El Salvador) Omar Sevilla

Clausura 2016 champions

3rd title

== Aggregate table ==
If the same team wins both Apertura and Clausura tournaments, the higher ranked runner-up team in the aggregate table will earn the second qualification position to 2016–17 CONCACAF Champions League.

Pos	Team	Pld	W	D	L	GF	GA	GD	Pts	Qualification or relegation
1	Águila	44	23	16	5	61	33	+28	85	
2	Santa Tecla	44	21	16	7	92	48	+44	79	
3	Alianza	44	18	18	8	72	45	+27	72	CONCACAF Champions League (Note: As Apertura champions)
4	Isidro Metapán	44	17	17	10	69	42	+27	68	
5	Juventud Independiente	44	17	12	15	51	58	−7	63	
6	Dragón	44	13	16	15	50	48	+2	55	CONCACAF Champions League (Note: As Clausura champions)
7	FAS	44	14	13	17	48	54	−6	55	
8	Chalatenango	44	14	13	17	51	66	−15	55	
9	Pasaquina	44	13	15	16	55	64	−9	54	
10	UES	44	11	10	23	37	62	−25	43	
11	Sonsonate	44	10	13	21	46	73	−27	43	
12	Atlético Marte	44	6	15	23	33	72	−39	33	Segunda División

Source: primerafutboles.com
Rules for classification: 1) points; 2) goal difference; 3) number of goals scored.

=== Positions by round ===
This table lists the positions of teams after each week of matches. In order to preserve the chronological evolution, any postponed matches are not included to the round at which they were originally scheduled, but added to the full round they were played immediately afterwards. For example, if a match is scheduled for matchday 3, but then postponed and played between days 6 and 7, it will be added to the standings for day 6.

Team ╲ Round	1	2	3	4	5	6	7	8	9	10	11	12	13	14	15	16	17	18	19	20	21	22
Águila	3	1	1	1	2	2	2	2	4	2	2	2	2	1	1	1	1	1	1	2	2	2
Isidro Metapán	4=	8	9	10	7	8	9	10	11	9	4	4	4	4	4	3	3	3	3	1	1	1
Santa Tecla	1	6	2	5	8	9	5	5	7	6	6	7	7	6	5	7	7	7	5	5	5	4
Alianza	4=	3	5	3	3	3	4	4	3	4	3	3	3	3	3	5	5	4	4	4	3	3
FAS	10	5	3	2	1	1	1	1	1	1	1	1	1	2	2	2	2	2	2	3	4	5
Chalatenango	4=	10	10	11	11	11	11	12	8=	7	8	8	8	8	7	8	6	6	7	7	7	6
Dragón	11	7	7	4	4	4	3	3	2	3	5	6	6	5	8	6	8	8	8	8	8	8
Pasaquina	4=	4	6	8	9	7	8	9	6	5	7	5	5	7	6	4	4	5	6	6	6	7
Juventud Independiente	12	12	8	6	5	5	6	6	10	10	11	11	10	10	11	11	10	10	10	10	9	9
Sonsonate	4=	11	12	12	12	12	12	8	5	8	9	9	9	9	10	9	9	9	9	9	10	10
UES	4=	9	11	9	10	10	10	11	12	12	12	12	12	12	12	12	12	12	12	12	12	12
Atlético Marte	2	2	4	7	6	6	7	7	8=	11	10	10	11	11	9	10	11	11	11	11	11	11

= Relegation to Segunda División

Team ╲ Round	23	24	25	26	27	28	29	30	31	32	33	34	35	36	37	38	39	40	41	42	43	44
Águila	1	1	1	1	1	1	1	1							1	1	1	1	1	1	1	1
Isidro Metapán	3	3	3	3	4	2									3	4	4	4	4	4	4	4
Santa Tecla	5	5	6	5	5	3									2	2	2	2	2	2	2	2
Alianza	2	2	2	2	2	4									4	3	3	3	3	3	3	3
FAS	4	4	5	4	3	5									6	6	6	6	6	7	7	7
Chalatenango	6	6	4	6	6	6									7	7	7	7	7	8	8	8
Dragón	8	8	8	8	8	7									8	8	8	8	8	6	6	6
Pasaquina	7	7	7	7	7	8									9	9	9	9	9	9	9	9
Juventud Independiente	9	9	9	9	9	9									5	5	5	5	5	5	5	5
Sonsonate	10	10	10	10	10	10									10	10	10	10	10	10	11	11
UES	12	12	12	12	12	11									11	11	11	11	11	11	10	10
Atlético Marte	11	11	11	11	11	12									12	12	12	12	12	12	12	12

= Relegation to Segunda División

== List of foreign players in the league ==
This is a list of foreign players in the 2015–16 season. The following players:

1. Have played at least one game for the respective club.
2. Have not been capped for the El Salvador national football team on any level, independently from the birthplace

A new rule was introduced this season, that clubs can have five foreign players per club (though two have to be from Central America) and can only add a new player if there is an injury or a player/s is released.

Águila

- (Colombia) Eder Arias
- (Colombia) Jhony Rios
- (Colombia) Jimmy Valoyes
- (Peru) Miguel Curiel
- (Jamaica) Keithy Simpson
- (Puerto Rico) Héctor Ramos

Alianza

- (Colombia) Iván Garrido
- (Colombia) Oscar Guerrero
- (Argentina) Jonathan Philippe
- (Trinidad and Tobago) Willis Plaza

Atlético Marte

- (Colombia) Nestor Asprilla
- (Brazil) Wésley Brasilia
- (Colombia) Cristian Mosquera
- (Uruguay) Sebastián Gutiérrez
- (Uruguay) Nicolás Céspedes

Chalatenango

- (Colombia) Bladimir Díaz
- (Uruguay) Christian Vaquero
- (Trinidad and Tobago) Kordell Samuel
- (Mexico) Pablo Hütt

Dragón

- (Colombia) John Machado
- (Colombia) Héctor Lemus
- (Brazil) Jackson de Oliveira
- (Argentina) Allan Muraldo
- (Argentina) Bryan Lanzeni

FAS

- (Brazil) Josimar Moreira
- (Honduras) Walter Martínez
- (Colombia) Mauricio Mendoza
- (Argentina) Jonathan Lezcano
- (Argentina) Lucas Vico

Firpo (Clausura)*

- (Colombia) Eder Arias
- (Colombia) Jhony Rios
- (Colombia) Maikon Palacios

Juventud Independiente (Apertura)

- (Colombia) Nixon Restrepo
- (Colombia) Jefferson Viveros

Isidro Metapán

- (Colombia) Andrés Angulo
- (Mexico) (United States) David López
- (Jamaica) Romeo Parkes
- (Colombia) Michael López

Pasaquina

- (Saint Kitts and Nevis) Devaughn Elliott
- (Brazil) Glaúber da Silva
- (Colombia) Neymer Miranda
- (Argentina) Manuel Lucero
- (Paraguay) Gustavo Guerreño

Sonsonate

- (Colombia) Fredy Gonzales
- (Brazil) Augusto Do Carmo
- (Colombia) William Guerrero
- (Argentina) Fernando Gallo
- (Colombia) Oscar Móvil

Santa Tecla

- (Argentina) Martín Giménez
- (Colombia) Luis Hinestroza
- (Brazil) Ricardinho
- (Mexico) Joel Almeida

UES

- (Brazil) Raphael Alves
- (Colombia) Carlos Ceballos
- (Brazil) Augusto Do Carmo
- (Trinidad and Tobago) Weslie John
- (Jamaica) Mckauly Tulloch

(player released during the Apertura season) (player released between the Apertura and Clausura seasons)
