= Primera División de Fútbol Profesional – Clausura 2015 =

Primera División de Fútbol de El Salvador
- Season: Clausura 2015
- Champions: Santa Tecla F.C.
- Relegated: Atlético Marte
- Champions League: Santa Tecla F.C.
- Matches: 96
- Goals: 234 (2.44 per match)
- Top goalscorer: Héctor Ramos (10)
- Biggest home win: C.D. Águila 5-1 C.D. Dragón; A.D. Isidro Metapán 4-0 UES (TBD)
- Biggest away win: C.D. Pasaquina 0-4 Alianza F.C. (TBD)
- Highest scoring: C.D. Águila 4-3 A.D. Isidro Metapán
- Longest winning run: games by: TBD
- Longest unbeaten run: games by: TBD
- Longest winless run: games by: TBD
- Longest losing run: games by: TBD
- Highest attendance: 8,748 people, Alianza F.C. vs C.D. FAS
- Lowest attendance: 71 people, UES vs Dragón
- Average attendance: 1,549 people (average)

The Clausura 2015 season was the 34th edition of El Salvador's Primera División de Fútbol de El Salvador since its establishment of an Apertura and Clausura format. Isidro Metapán were the defending champions. The league consisted of 10 teams, each playing a home and away game against the other clubs for a total of 18 games, respectively. The top four teams at the end of the regular season will take part of the playoffs.

== Team information ==
A total of 10 teams will contest the league

== Stadia and locations ==
Location of teams in Apertura 2014/Clausura 2015

Team	Home city	Stadium	Capacity
Águila	San Miguel	Juan Francisco Barraza	10,000
Alianza	San Salvador	Estadio Jorge "Mágico" González	32,000
Atlético Marte	San Salvador	Estadio Cuscatlán	45,925
C.D. Dragon	San Miguel	Juan Francisco Barraza	10,000
FAS	Santa Ana	Estadio Óscar Quiteño	15,000
Isidro Metapán	Metapán	Estadio Jorge Calero Suárez	8,000
Juventud Independiente	San Juan Opico	Complejo Municipal	5,000
C.D. Pasaquina	Pasaquina	Estadio San Sebastián	5,000
Santa Tecla	Santa Tecla	Estadio Las Delicias	10,000
UES	San Salvador	Estadio Universitario UES	10,000

=== Personnel and sponsoring ===
Team	Chairman	Head coach	Kitmaker	Shirt sponsor
Águila	(El Salvador) Pedro Arieta	(Panama) Julio Dely Valdés	Joma	Tigo
Alianza	(El Salvador) Lisandro Pohl	(Argentina) Ramiro Cepeda	Lotto	UNO, Pepsi, Domino's Pizza
Atlético Marte	(El Salvador) Hugo Carrillo	(Argentina) Jorge Garcia	Galaxia	Lemus, Evisal, Galaxia, Techos Eureka
C.D. Dragón	(El Salvador) Carlos Meza	(Argentina) Roberto Gamarra	Milan	Texas Casino, Hotel Real Centro, Pepsi, Pharmacia La bueno
FAS	(El Salvador) Byron Rodriguez	(Peru) Agustín Castillo	Galaxia	Coop-1 de R.L., Galaxia, Pilsener, Lays Chips, Tigo
Isidro Metapán	(El Salvador) Rafael Morataya	(El Salvador) Jorge Rodriguez	Milán (Jaguar Sportic)	Grupo Bimbo, Arroz San Pedro, Holcim, Pepsi,
Juventud Independiente	(El Salvador) Romeo Barillas	(El Salvador) Juan Ramón Sánchez	Milán (Jaguar Sportic)	Ria
Pasaquina	(El Salvador) Abilio Menjivar	(Argentina) Juan Andrés Sarulyte	Jaguar Sportic	Ria, Port
Santa Tecla	(El Salvador) Oscar Ortiz	(Argentina) Osvaldo Escudero	Reto	Rio, La Curaco, Pollo, Plaza Merliot, Bingo Cup
UES	(El Salvador) Rufino Quesada	(El Salvador) Willian Renderos Iraheta	Maca	Alba Petróleos, Gatorade

== Managerial changes ==
=== Before the start of the season ===
Team	Outgoing manager	Manner of departure	Date of vacancy	Replaced by	Date of appointment	Position in table
Atletico Marte	(El Salvador) Guillermo Rivera	Contract not renewed	December 2014	(Argentina) Jorge Garcia	December 2014	9th (Apertura 2014)
C.D. Pasaquina	(Argentina) Jorge Garcia	Contract not renewed	December 2014	(Argentina) Juan Andrés Sarulyte	December 2014	10th (Apertura 2014)
C.D. Aguila	(Argentina) Daniel Messina	Contract finished	December 2014	(Panama) Julio Dely Valdés	30 December 2014	3rd and runner up (Apertura 2014)

=== During the season ===
Team	Outgoing manager	Manner of departure	Date of vacancy	Replaced by	Date of appointment	Position in table
C.D. Dragon	(Argentina) Roberto Gamarra	Resigned	Feb 2015	(El Salvador) Guillermo Rivera	Feb 2015	10th (Clausura 2015)
Atletico Marte	(Argentina) Jorge Garcia	Sacked	Feb 2015	(Argentina) Daniel Fernández	Feb 2015	9th (Clausura 2015)
C.D. Dragon	(El Salvador) Guillermo Rivera	Sacked	March 2015	(El Salvador) Santos Rivera/Abel Blanco	March 2015	9th (Clausura 2015)
Alianza F.C.	(Argentina) Ramiro Cepeda	Sacked	March 2015	(Uruguay) Rubén Alonso	March 2015	5th (Clausura 2015)

== League table ==
Pos	Team	Pld	W	D	L	GF	GA	GD	Pts	Qualification
1	Isidro Metapán (Q)	18	10	3	5	27	15	+12	33	Qualification for playoffs
2	Juventud Independiente (Q)	18	9	2	7	26	22	+4	29	Qualification for playoffs
3	Santa Tecla (Q)	18	8	5	5	26	23	+3	29	Qualification for playoffs
4	Alianza	18	7	6	5	22	17	+5	27	
5	FAS (Q)	18	7	6	5	20	16	+4	27 (Note: FAS won the extra game by 6-5 on penalties (after the game was tied 2-2 in extra time) against Alianza F.C. for the last place of the playoffs.)	Qualification for playoffs
6	Águila	18	7	3	8	22	20	+2	24	
7	Pasaquina	18	6	5	7	19	25	−6	23	
8	Atlético Marte	18	6	3	9	19	20	−1	21	
9	UES	18	5	3	10	19	29	−10	18	
10	Dragón	18	4	6	8	15	28	−13	18	

Updated to match(es) played on 11 March 2015. Source:
Rules for classification: 1) points; 2) goal difference; 3) number of goals scored.
(Q) Qualified for the phase indicated

== Results ==
Home \ Away	ÁGU	ALI	ATM	DRA	FAS	MET	JUV	PAS	STE	UES
Águila		1–1	0–0	5–1	1–2	4–3	2–1	3–0	1–2	1–0
Alianza	1–0		1–1	1–1	1–1	1–1	2–0	1–0	1–2	1–4
Atlético Marte	2–0	0–2		4–1	1–2	0–1	2–3	1–1	2–0	1–0
Dragón	1–0	1–1	1–0		1–3	1–2	1–1	1–0	2–2	0–1
C.D. FAS	0–1	1–0	2–0	0–1		0–0	1–2	0–0	3–1	1–1
Isidro Metapán	2–0	0–1	2–1	1–0	2–0		1–1	2–1	1–0	4–0
Juventud Independiente	0–1	1–0	0–2	3–0	1–0	0–3		4–2	3–0	2–1
Pasaquina	2–1	0–4	1–0	1–1	1–1	2–1	1–0		1–2	3–1
Santa Tecla	0–0	3–2	1–2	2–0	0–0	1–0	3–1	2–2		3–0
C.D. Universidad de El Salvador	2–1	0–1	2–0	1–1	2–3	2–1	0–3	0–1	2–2	

Updated to match(es) played on 18 January 2015. Source:
Legend: Blue = home team win; Yellow = draw; Red = away team win.

=== Scoring ===
- First goal of the season: (El Salvador) William Maldonado for Santa Tecla F.C. against UES, 10 minutes (17 January 2015)
- Fastest goal in a match: TBD minute - (El Salvador) TBD for TBD against TBD (TBD TBD 2015)
- Goal scored at the latest point in a match: 94 minutes - (El Salvador) Elman Rivas for UES against Santa Tecla F.C. (17 January 2015)
- First penalty Kick of the season: (El Salvador) Elman Rivas for UES against Santa Tecla F.C., 56 minutes (17 January 2015)
- Widest winning margin: 4 goals
  - Alianza F.C. 4–0 C.D. Pasaquina (2015)
- First hat-trick of the season: (Brazil) Ricardo de Ferreria for Santa Tecla F.C. against Juventud Independiente (TBD TBD 2015)
- First own goal of the season: (El Salvador) TBD (TBD) for TBD (2015)
- Most goals in a match: 7 Goals C.D. Aguila 4–3 A.D. Isidro Metapan (2015)
- Most goals by one team in a match: 4 Goals
  - C.D. Aguila 5–1 C.D. Dragon (TBD 2015)
- Most goals in one half by one team: 4 Goals C.D. Aguila 5–1 C.D. Dragon (2015)
- Most goals scored by losing team: 3 Goals
  - A.D. Isidro Metapan 3–4 C.D. Aguila (2015)
- Most goals by one player in a single match: 3 Goals
  - (Brazil) Ricardo de Ferreria for Santa Tecla F.C. against Juventud Independiente (January 2015)
  - (Panama) Nicolas Munoz for C.D. Aguila against A.D. Isidro Metapan (1 February 2015)

== Top goalscorers ==
Rank	Player	Team	Goals
1	(Puerto Rico) Héctor Ramos	Isidro Metapan	13
2	(Panama) (El Salvador) Nicolás Muñoz	C.D. Aguila	11
3	(El Salvador) David Rugamas	Juventud Independiente	11
4	(El Salvador) Irvin Herrera	Santa Tecla F.C.	8
5	(Argentina) Jonathan Philippe	Alianza F.C.	8
6	(Brazil) Ricardinho Paraiba	Santa Tecla F.C.	6
7	(El Salvador) Elman Rivas	UES	5
8	(El Salvador) Herbert Sosa	Juventud Independiente	5
9	(Argentina) Julián Di Cosmo	C.D. FAS	5
10	(El Salvador) Dustin Corea	C.D. FAS	4

== Playoffs ==
Semifinals
1	Isidro Metapan	2	0	2
4	FAS	0	1	1
2	Juventud Independiente	3	1	4
3	Santa Tecla	3	3	6

Final
1	Isidro Metapan	1 (1)
3	Santa Tecla	1 (3)

=== Semi-finals ===
==== First leg ====
May 9, 2015
4:00pm

Santa Tecla	3-3	Juventud Independiente
Iván Mancía 11'; Irvin Herrera 47', 85'		Luis Mauricio Perla 9', 45'; Juan Díaz 58'

Estadio Las Delicias,
Santa Tecla, El Salvador
Attendance: 1,729
Referee: German Martínez

May 10, 2015
3:45pm

FAS	0-2	Isidro Metapán
		Romeo Parkes 14'; Héctor Ramos 91'

Estadio Óscar Quiteño,
Santa Ana, El Salvador
Attendance: 7,051

==== Second leg ====
May 16, 2015
7:00 pm

Isidro Metapán	0-1	C.D. FAS
		Cristian Álvarez 64'

Estadio Jorge Calero Suarez, Metapán

Isidro Metapan won 2–1 on aggregate.

May 17, 2015

Juventud Independiente	1-3	Santa Tecla FC
Rodrigo Rivera 47'		Ricardo Ferreira 13'; Irvin Herrera 42'; Gerson Mayén 87'

Complejo Municipal San Juan Opico
Attendance: 2,368
Referee: Joel Aguilar Chicas

Santa Tecla won 6–4 on aggregate.

=== Final ===
24 May 2015
15:00 UTC-6

Isidro Metapán	1-1	Santa Tecla FC
Ricardo Ulloa 82'		William Maldonado 21'
Penalties
Héctor Ramos (penalty missed); Víctor Merino (penalty missed); Medardo Max Guevara (penalty missed); Josué Flores (penalty scored)	1-3	Ricardinho Paraiba (penalty missed); Gerson Mayen (penalty scored); Marlon Cornejo (penalty scored); Diego Chavarría (penalty missed); Juan Barahona (penalty scored)

Estadio Cuscatlan, San Salvador
Attendance: 6,152
Referee: Marlon Mejía

Isidro Metapán:
GK	TBD	(El Salvador) Henry Hernández
DF	TBD	(El Salvador) Francisco Jovel Alvarez
DF	TBD	(El Salvador) Jonathan Barrios	(substituted off) 80'
DF	TBD	(El Salvador) Milton Molina
DF	TBD	(El Salvador) José Peraza	(yellow card) 113'
MF	TBD	(El Salvador) Marvin Monterrosa
MF	TBD	(El Salvador) Christian Sanchez	(substituted off) 78'
MF	TBD	(El Salvador) Narciso Orellana	(substituted off) 64'
MF	TBD	(Jamaica) Romeo Ovando Parkes
FW	TBD	(Puerto Rico) Héctor Ramos
FW	TBD	(El Salvador) Josué Flores
Substitutes:
FW	TBD	(El Salvador) Víctor Merino	(substituted on) 64'
FW	TBD	(El Salvador) Medardo Guevara	(substituted on) 78'
MF	TBD	(El Salvador) Ricardo Ulloa	(substituted on) 80'
Manager:
(El Salvador) Jorge Rodriguez

Santa Tecla:
GK	1	(El Salvador) Derby Carrillo
DF	TBD	(El Salvador) Bryan Tamacas	(substituted off) 91'
DF	TBD	(El Salvador) Ivan Mancia
DF	TBD	(El Salvador) Giovanni Zavaleta
DF	TBD	(El Salvador) Juan Barahona
MF	TBD	(El Salvador) Gerson Mayen
MF	TBD	(El Salvador) Diego Chavarría
MF	TBD	(El Salvador) William Maldonado	(yellow card) 15' (substituted off) 62'
MF	TBD	(El Salvador) Marlon Cornejo
FW	TBD	(Brazil) Ricardinho Paraiba	(yellow card) 115'
FW	TBD	(El Salvador) Irvin Herrera	(substituted off) 69'
Substitutes:
MF	TBD	(El Salvador) Aldair Rivera	(substituted on) 62'
MF	TBD	(El Salvador) Kevin Ayala	(substituted on) 69'
MF	TBD	(El Salvador) William Mancía	(substituted on) 91'
Manager:
(Argentina) Osvaldo Escudero

Clausura 2015 champions

1st title

== List of foreign players in the league ==
This is a list of foreign players in Clausura 2014. The following players:

1. have played at least one apertura game for the respective club.
2. have not been capped for the El Salvador national football team on any level, independently from the birthplace

A new rule was introduced a few season ago, that clubs can only have three foreign players per club and can only add a new player if there is an injury or player/s is released.

C.D. Águila

- (Colombia) Eder Arias
- (Panama) Miguel Camargo
- TBD

Alianza F.C.

- (Argentina) Jorge Drovandi
- (Argentina) Matías Córdoba
- (Argentina) Jonathan Philippe

Atlético Marte

- (Colombia) Nestor Asprilla
- (Colombia) Martín García
- (Argentina) Agustín Adorni

C.D. Dragón

- (Colombia) Jhony Rios
- (Colombia) Jimmy Valoyes
- (Jamaica) Sean Fraser

Juventud Independiente

- (Trinidad and Tobago) Yohance Marshall
- (Colombia) Juan Díaz
- (Colombia) Andrés Giraldo

C.D. FAS

- (Brazil) Glauber Rodrigues
- (Argentina) Alejandro Bentos
- (Argentina) Julián Di Cosmo
- (Colombia) Cristian González

A.D. Isidro Metapán

- (Puerto Rico) Héctor Ramos
- (Mexico) (United States) David López
- (Jamaica) Romeo Parkes

Pasaquina

- (Brazil) Glaúber da Silva
- (Trinidad and Tobago) Samuel Kordell

Santa Tecla F.C.

- (Argentina) Rodrigo de Brito
- (Brazil) Ricardinho
- (Argentina) Ignacio Colombo

UES

- (Jamaica) Garrick Gordon
- (Argentina) Francisco Ladogano
- (Argentina) Santiago Davio

(player released during the season)

== Aggregate table ==
Pos	Team	Pld	W	D	L	GF	GA	GD	Pts	Qualification or relegation
1	Isidro Metapán	36	17	10	9	47	34	+13	61	Qualification for 2015–16 CONCACAF Champions League
2	Santa Tecla	36	16	11	9	46	38	+8	59	Qualification for 2015–16 CONCACAF Champions League
3	FAS	36	14	13	9	38	27	+11	55	
4	Juventud Independiente	36	16	6	14	52	46	+6	54	
5	Águila	36	15	8	13	37	31	+6	53	
6	Alianza	36	12	12	12	40	37	+3	48	
7	Dragón	36	11	10	15	35	46	−11	43	
8	UES	36	11	9	16	36	44	−8	42	
9	Pasaquina	36	9	11	16	31	54	−23	38	
10	Atlético Marte (R)	36	9	10	17	38	43	−5	37	Relegation to Segunda División

Updated to match(es) played on 18 January 2015. Source:
Rules for classification: 1) points; 2) goal difference; 3) number of goals scored.
(R) Relegated

== Attendances ==
Alianza FC drew 23,356 fans in their first five 2015 Clausura home games, the most in the league.

#	Football club	Average attendance
1	Alianza FC	4,732
2	Águila	2,840
3	CD FAS	2,590
4	Santa Tecla FC	1,280
5	AD Isidro Metapán	1,050
6	Juventud Independiente	650
7	CD Atlético Marte	595
8	CD Pasaquina	590
9	CD Dragón	420
10	CD Universidad de El Salvador	310
