= List of Juventud Independiente records and statistics =

This article lists various statistics related to Juventud Independiente.

All stats accurate as of 17 December 2014.

== Honours ==
As of 6 February 2015 Juventud Independiente have won 2 Segunda División trophies.

=== Domestic competitions ===
==== League ====
Segunda División de El Salvador

- Winners (2): 2008 Clausura, 2011 Clausura

== Individual awards ==
=== Award winners ===
Top Goalscorer (1)

The following players have won the Goalscorer while playing for Santa Tecla:

- (Uruguay) Jesús Toscanini (13) – Apertura 2013

== Goalscorers ==
- Most goals scored : **29** - Irvin Valdez
- Most League goals: **29** - Irvin Valdez
- Most League goals in a season: **14** - Jesús Toscanini, Primera Division, Apertura 2013
- Most goals scored by a Juventud player in a match:
- Most goals scored by a Juventud player in an International match:
- Most goals scored in CONCACAF competition:

=== All-time top goalscorers ===
No.	Player	period	Goals
1	(El Salvador) Irvin Valdez	2013-2015	30
2	(El Salvador) David Rugamas	2013-2015	27
3	(Uruguay) Jesús Toscanini	2013	22
4	(Uruguay) Juan Carlos Reyes	2011-2013	21
5	(El Salvador) Óscar Cerén	2009-2014	19
6	(El Salvador) Darwin Cerén	2009–2014	15
7	(El Salvador) Yuvini Salamanca	2010-2015	10

Note: Players in bold text are still active with Santa Tecla F.C.

==== Historical goals ====
Goal	Name	Date	Match
1st in Primera Division	(Argentina) Carlos Daniel Escalante	8 June 2008	Juventud Independiente 1 – Alianza F.C. 3
100th	(El Salvador) Darwin Ceren	23 September 2012	Juventud Independiente 1 - Once Municipal 1

== Players ==
=== Appearances ===
==== Other appearances records ====
- Youngest first-team player:
- Oldest first-team player:
- Most appearances in Primera Division:
- Most appearances in International competitions:
- Most appearances in CONCACAF competitions:
- Most appearances in CONCACAF Champions League:
- Most appearances as a foreign player in all competitions:
- Most appearances as a foreign player in Primera Division:
- Most consecutive League appearances:
- Shortest appearance: –

== Records ==
=== Scorelines ===
- Record League victory: 6–0 v Alianza, Primera division, 27 October 2013
- Record League Defeat: 0-10 v C.D. Aguila, Primera division, August 24, 2008
- Record Cup victory:
- Record CONCACAF Champions League Victory:
- Record CONCACAF Champions League Defeat:

=== Sequences ===
- Most wins in a row:
- Most home wins in a row (all competitions):
- Most home league wins in a row:
- Most away wins in a row:
- Most draws in a row:
- Most home draws in a row:
- Most away draws in a row:
- Most defeats in a row:
- Most home defeats in a row:
- Most away defeats in a row:
- Longest unbeaten run: 18, 2003 Season
- Longest unbeaten run at home:
- Longest unbeaten run away:
- Longest winless run:
- Longest winless run at home:
- Longest winless run away:

=== Seasonal ===
- Most goals in all competitions in a season: 40 goals - Apertura 2013
- Most League goals scored in a season (Apertura/Clausura): 40 goals - Apertura 2013
- Fewest league goals conceded in a season (Apertura/Clausura): 20 goals - Clausura 2013
- Most points in a season (Apertura/Clausura): 30 points - Apertura 2013
- Most League wins in a season (Apertura/Clausura): 8 wins – Clausura 2013, Apertura 2013, Clausura 2014
- Most League losses in a season (Apertura/Clausura): 12 losses – Clausura 2009
- Most home League wins in a season:
- Most away League wins in a season:

=== Internationals ===
- Most international caps (total while at club): 6 caps - Oscar Ceren - El Salvador

=== Attendances ===
- Highest home attendance: v A.D. Isidro Metapan, 1,647 (May 11, 2014)
- Highest away attendance:

== Internationals ==
The following players represented their countries while playing for Juventud Independiente (the figure in brackets is the number of caps gained while a Juventud Independiente player. The asterisk on the end means they earned their caps while at Juventud Independiente. Many of these players also gained caps while at other clubs. Figures for active players (in bold) last updated 2015.

El Salvador

- Óscar Cerén (6) *
- Darwin Cerén
- Guillermo Castro
- Álex Erazo
- Cristian Esnal (2) *
- Fidel Mondragón
- Carlos Menjívar
- Herbert Sosa (1) *
- Irvin Valdez (1) *
- David Rugamas (1) *
- Ramiro Carballo
- Ronald Pimentel

Trinidad & Tobago

- Yohance Marshall
