= José Ángel Peña =

Salvadoran footballer (born 1994)

José Angel Peña
Personal information
- Full name: José Angel Peña Carballo
- Date of birth: 10 December 1994 (age 31)
- Place of birth: San Salvador, El Salvador
- Height: 1.86 m (6 ft 1 in)
- Position: Forward

Youth career
- Turín FESA FC (youth)
- Sevilla FC (youth)
- CD Atlético Marte (reserves)
- Tigres UANL Premier (under-20)

Senior career*
Years	Team	Apps	(Gls)
2013–2014	→ FAS (loan)	10	(1)
2015	FAS	24	(2)
2016–2017	Isidro Metapán	85	(18)
2018	Municipal Limeño	23	(3)
2018–2020	Alianza	53	(12)
2020	Chalatenango	16	(5)
2021	Municipal Limeño	4	(0)
2022	Platense	17	(2)
2023–	Once Deportivo	14	(1)

International career^{‡}
2010–2011	El Salvador U17	4	(2)
2012–2013	El Salvador U20	13	(5)
2014	El Salvador U21	3	(1)
2015	El Salvador U23		
2015–	El Salvador	5	(0)
- * Club domestic league appearances and goals as of 00:42, 20 May 2019 (UTC) ‡ National team caps and goals as of 00:42, 20 May 2019 (UTC)

José Angel Peña Carballo (born 10 December 1994) is a Salvadoran professional footballer who plays as a forward for Salvadorian Primera División club Once Deportivo.

== Club career ==
=== FAS ===
Peña joined FAS on 30 December 2013. With the team of Santa Ana, he reached the semifinals of that tournament, but were defeated by Isidro Metapán 1–2 on aggregate. On 20 December 2015, Peña reached the Apertura 2015 final with FAS, but lost against Alianza.

=== Isidro Metapán ===
Peña signed with Isidro Metapán in 2016. On 7 December 2017, Peña scored the only goal of the 1–0 victory against Santa Tecla in the first leg of the semifinals of the Apertura 2017. However, Isidro Metapán was subsequently eliminated.

=== Municipal Limeño ===
On 19 December 2017, Peña signed a short-term contract with Municipal Limeño for the Clausura 2018.

=== Alianza ===
On 22 May 2018, Peña signed with Alianza for the Apertura 2018, signing a one-year contract. On 5 August 2018, Peña scored his first goal in a 3–3 draw against Municipal Limeño at the Estadio Cuscatlán.

On 8 December 2018, he scored two crucial goals in the 2–2 draw against FAS, in the second leg of the semifinals of the Apertura 2018. Alianza reached its fifth consecutive final since the Apertura 2016, but lost it 2–1 to Santa Tecla.

=== Chalatenango ===
On 5 May 2020, Peña joined Chalatenango for Apertura 2020, signing a one-year contract.

=== Return to Municipal Limeño ===
On 25 June 2021, Peña rejoined Municipal Limeño.

=== Platense ===
On 13 January 2022, Peña joined Platense for Apertura 2022.

=== Once Deportivo ===
On 15 January 2023, Peña joined Once Deportivo for Apertura 2023.

== Career statistics ==
=== Club ===
As of 7 December 2023

Appearances and goals by club, season and competition
Club	Season	League			Continental		Total	
Club	Season	Division	Apps	Goals	Apps	Goals	Apps	Goals
FAS	2013–14	Salvadorian Primera División	10	1	—		10	1
FAS	2014–15	Salvadorian Primera División	10	1	—		10	1
FAS	2015–16	Salvadorian Primera División	14	1	—		14	1
FAS	Total		34	3	0	0	34	3
Isidro Metapán	2015–16	Salvadorian Primera División	21	8	—		21	8
Isidro Metapán	2016–17	Salvadorian Primera División	38	6	—		38	6
Isidro Metapán	2017–18	Salvadorian Primera División	26	4	—		26	4
Isidro Metapán	Total		85	18	0	0	85	18
Municipal Limeño	2017–18	Salvadorian Primera División	23	3	—		23	3
Alianza	2018–19	Salvadorian Primera División	38	8	0	0	38	8
Alianza	2019–20	Salvadorian Primera División	15	4	2 (Note: Appearances in CONCACAF League)	0	17	4
Alianza	Total		53	12	2	0	55	12
Chalatenango	2020–21	Salvadorian Primera División	16	5	—		16	5
Municipal Limeño	2021–22	Salvadorian Primera División	4	0	—		4	0
Platense	2022–23	Salvadorian Primera División	17	2	—		17	2
Once Deportivo	2022–23	Salvadorian Primera División	17	1	—		17	1
Career total			246	44	2	0	248	44

== Honours ==
=== Player ===
==== Club ====
C.D. FAS

- Primera División
  - Runners-up: Apertura 2015

Alianza F.C.

- Primera División
  - Runners-up: Apertura 2018
