= Iván Garrido =

Iván Garrido may refer to:

- Iván Garrido (footballer, born 1981)
- Iván Garrido (footballer, born 1990)
