= Ignacio Colombo =

Argentine footballer

Personal information
- Date of birth: 12 October 1995 (age 31)
- Place of birth: Buenos Aires, Argentina
- Height: 1.74 m (5 ft 9 in)
- Position: Forward

Senior career*
Years	Team	Apps	(Gls)
2012–2013	Club Atlético Platense (under 18)		
2013–2014	Club Atlético Provincial		
2015	Santa Tecla		
- * Club domestic league appearances and goals

Ignacio Colombo (born 12 October 1995) is an Argentine footballer who plays as a forward.

== Career ==
In June 2015 it was announced reported that Colombo's contract at Santa Tecla would not be renewed and he would leave the club.

== Honours ==
Santa Tecla

- Salvadoran Primera División: Clausura 2015
