= Fernando Ledesma (footballer) =

Argentine footballer (born 1992)

Personal information
- Full name: Fernando Jesús Ledesma
- Date of birth: 3 January 1992 (age 34)
- Place of birth: Monte Buey, Argentina
- Height: 1.83 m (6 ft 0 in)
- Position: Centre-back

Youth career
- San Martín de Monte Buey

Senior career*
| Years | Team | Apps | (Gls) |
| 2010–2011 | Newell's Old Boys | | |
| 2012–2013 | San Luis | 17 | (1) |
| 2013 | Unión La Calera | 7 | (0) |
| 2017 | ADIUR | 16 | (1) |
- * Club domestic league appearances and goals

Fernando Jesús Ledesma (born 3 January 1992) is an Argentine former footballer who played as a centre-back.

== Career ==
Ledesma was born in Monte Buey, Argentina and he started his career with his local club San Martín de Monte Buey before moving to Newell's Old Boys. He joined Chilean second-tier club San Luis de Quillota in 2012, and made his debut as a second-half substitute in a 2–2 draw with San Marcos de Arica on 28 April 2012. The next year, he switched to Unión La Calera in the top level.

In 2017, Ledesma played for Agrupación Deportiva Infantil Unión Rosario (ADIUR) in the Torneo Federal B.

== Post-retirement ==
Ledesma graduated as a lawyer.

In January 2024, Ledesma assumed as sport manager of Salvadoran club Santa Tecla.

== Career statistics ==
As of 23 May 2012

| Club | Season | League | | Cup | | Other | | Total | |
| Club | Season | Apps | Goals | Apps | Goals | Apps | Goals | Apps | Goals |
|---|---|---|---|---|---|---|---|---|---|
| San Luis de Quillota | 2011–12 | 2 | 0 | 0 | 0 | 0 | 0 | 2 | 0 |
| Career total | | 2 | 0 | 0 | 0 | 0 | 0 | 2 | 0 |
