= Nixon Restrepo =

Colombian footballer (born 1993)

Personal information
- Full name: Nixon Alexander Restrepo Mena
- Date of birth: 28 December 1993 (age 32)
- Place of birth: Colombia
- Height: 1.88 m (6 ft 2 in)
- Position: Defender

Senior career*
Years	Team	Apps	(Gls)
2012–2015	Rionegro Águilas		
2015–2016	Juventud Independiente	13	(1)
- * Club domestic league appearances and goals

Nixon Alexander Restrepo Mena (born 28 December 1993) is a Colombian professional footballer who plays as a defender.
