= Jackson (footballer, born 1987) =

Brazilian footballer

Personal information
- Full name: Antonio Jackson de Oliveira Alcántara
- Date of birth: 22 November 1987 (age 38)
- Place of birth: Parnarama, Brazil
- Height: 1.75 m (5 ft 9 in)
- Position: Forward

Team information
- Current team: Atletico Balboa

Youth career
- 2005: Sociedade Esportiva Juventude (under 18)

Senior career*
Years	Team	Apps	(Gls)
2006	Sociedade Esportiva Juventude		
2006–2007	GD Bragança		
2007	Astral Esporte Clube		
2008	Sport Club Capixaba		
2009	América FC		
2010	Quixadá		
2011	Petrolina		
2011	Timbaúba		
2011	4 de Julho		
2012	América FC		
2012	Penedense		
2013	São Benedito		
2013	Quixadá		
2014	Auto Esporte		
2015	Bahia de Feira		
2015	Sousa		
2015–2016	Dragón		
2016–2017	Sonsonate	17	(2)
2017	Dragón		
2017	Pasaquina	18	(2)
2018	Parrillas One		
2018	Dragón		
2018–2019	CSD Sololá		
2019–2020	A.D. Municipal		
2021–2022	C.D. Cacahuatique		
2022–	Atletico Balboa		
- * Club domestic league appearances and goals

Antonio Jackson de Oliveira Alcántara (born 22 November 1987), also known as Jackson, is a Brazilian professional footballer who plays as a forward.
