= Francisco Medrano (footballer) =

Salvadoran footballer (born 1983)

Personal information
- Full name: Francisco José Medrano Magaña
- Date of birth: July 14, 1983 (age 43)
- Place of birth: San Salvador, El Salvador
- Height: 1.75 m (5 ft 9 in)
- Position: Midfielder

Youth career
- San Luis

Senior career*
Years	Team	Apps	(Gls)
2000–2002	Alianza	4	
2003–2009	Luis Ángel Firpo	117	
2010	Águila	2	
2010	Once Municipal	17	
2011–2012	UES	26	(2)
2011–2012	Santa Tecla	7	
2013–2014	C.D. Marte Soyapango	26	(0)
2014–2015	Real Destroyer	29	(1)
2015	Sonsonate	13	(0)

International career
2007	El Salvador	1	(0)
- * Club domestic league appearances and goals

Francisco José Medrano Magaña (born July 14, 1983) is a former footballer who played as a midfielder. His last team was Sonsonate F.C.

== Club career ==
Medrano was born in San Salvador, El Salvador. He joined Alianza Reserves from San Luis Talpa Reserves in 2001 and was barely used for the seniors in the next season, prompting him to leave for Luis Ángel Firpo where he did get significant playing time. In 2010, he moved to Águila, but again he did not play regularly and joined Once Municipal for the 2011 Clausura, only for them to be relegated.

== Futsal career ==
After leaving Primera División de Fútbol de El Salvador due to economic reasons, Medrano began his Futsal career achieving his first championship with Inter Sivar F.C. in 2021 Medrano along with his team won the Salvadoran Futsal Second Division earning his pass to the Premier League.

In February 2021 he was called on to play the qualification stage for the FIFA Futsal World Cup.

== International career ==
Medrano made his debut for El Salvador in an August 2007 friendly match against Honduras, coming on as a substitute for Eliseo Quintanilla. As of July 2011, he has not played any more internationals.
