= Luis Hinestroza =

Colombian footballer (born 1992)

Personal information
- Full name: Luis Edward Hinestroza Córdoba
- Date of birth: 16 April 1992 (age 34)
- Place of birth: Cali, Colombia
- Height: 1.78 m (5 ft 10 in)
- Position: Winger

Youth career
- 2010: Boyacá Chicó (Juvenile)

Senior career*
Years	Team	Apps	(Gls)
2011	Boyacá Chicó		
2011	San Luis (Sub-20)		
2012	Deportivo Tepic		
2012	Club Tijuana (Sub-20)		
2013	Estudiantes Tecos		
2014–2015	Atlético Chicago		
2015–2016	Santa Tecla		
2017–2018	Alianza	60	(9)
2018	Atlético Chicago		
2018–2023	Al Mokawloon Al Arab	146	(14)
2023–2024	Erbil		
2024–2025	Al-Safa		
2026–	Cacahuatique		
- * Club domestic league appearances and goals

Luis Edward Hinestroza Córdoba (born 16 April 1992) is a Colombian professional footballer who plays as a winger.

In 2016, Hinestroza was involved in an administrative conflict between the clubs Santa Tecla, Chalatenango and Isidro Metapán, because of a double signature of employment contracts. The result was his suspension, and a fine to the player. Some time later, Hinestroza was able to play again.
