= Jhony Rios =

Colombian footballer (born 1985)

Personal information
- Full name: Johnny Alberto Rios Torres
- Date of birth: 14 March 1985 (age 41)
- Place of birth: Colombia
- Height: 1.90 m (6 ft 3 in)
- Position: Centre back

Youth career
- 2004: América de Cali

Senior career*
Years	Team	Apps	(Gls)
2005	América de Cali		
2006–2007	Unión Magdalena		
2008	Patriotas FC		
2009	Expreso Rojo		
2009–2010	Tauro FC		
2011	Depor	15	(3)
2012	La Equidad	3	(0)
2013–2015	Dragón		
2015	Águila	20	(0)
2016	Juventud Independiente	20	(1)
2016–2018	Luis Ángel Firpo	65	(4)
2018–2019	Municipal Limeño	42	(2)
2019–2020	Isidro Metapán	8	(0)
- * Club domestic league appearances and goals as of 22:41, 20 September 2019 (UTC)

Johnny Alberto Rios Torres (born 14 March 1985) is a former Colombian professional footballer who last played as a centre back.

== Club career ==
=== Dragón ===
In 2013, Ríos signed with Dragón of El Salvador.

=== Águila ===
In 2015, Ríos signed with Águila. After the season finished, Rios and the club could not come to agreement with the extension of the contract and Rios departed.

=== Juventud Independiente ===
Ríos signed with Juventud Independiente for the Clausura 2016 tournament.

=== Luis Ángel Firpo ===
Luis Ángel Firpo bought the category from Juventud Independiente to play in the Primera División. Once the administrative processes were carried out, Ríos went on to play with Luis Ángel Firpo.

=== Municipal Limeño ===
Ríos signed with Municipal Limeño for the Apertura 2018 tournament.
