= Douglas Vidal Jiménez =

Salvadoran footballer and manager (born 1968)

Personal information
- Full name: Douglas Vidal Jiménez
- Date of birth: 8 April 1968 (age 58)
- Place of birth: San Salvador, El Salvador
- Height: 1.74 m (5 ft 9 in)
- Position: Midfielder

Senior career*
Years	Team	Apps	(Gls)
1990–1999	ADET		
2000	Once Municipal		
2001	Municipal San Salvador		

International career
1991–1996	El Salvador	2	(0)

Managerial career
- 2004–2006: Nejapa
- 2006: Once Municipal (assistant)
- 2015–2016: Atlético Marte
- * Club domestic league appearances and goals

Douglas Vidal Jimenez (born 8 April 1968) is a Salvadoran retired footballer and manager.

In 2015, Vidal Jiménez was elected president of the Association of Football Coaches of El Salvador (AEFES), at a general assembly that the organization celebrated.

Jiménez explained that his arrival at the front of AEFES was due to the fact that together with other colleagues saw in the organization the possibility of making a change in national football.
