= Parnarama =

Coordinates: 5°41′S 43°06′W

- Municipality
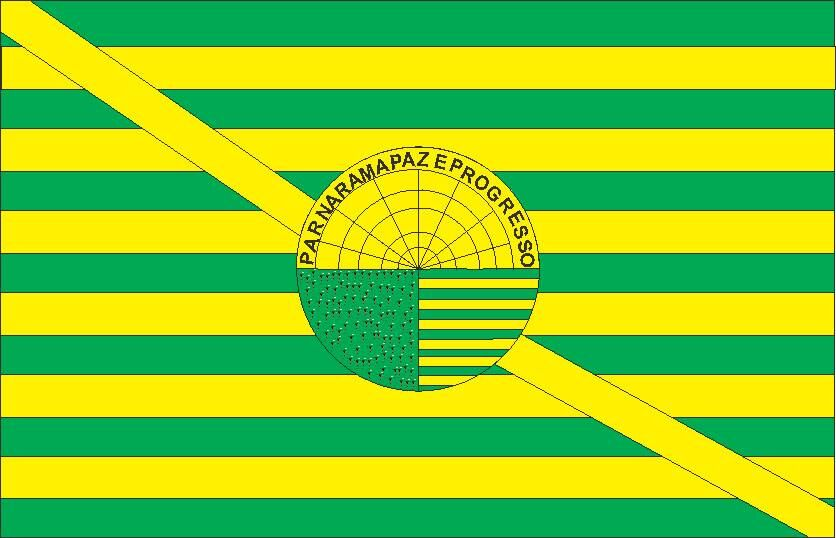
- Flag
- Interactive map of Parnarama
- Country: Brazil
- Region: Nordeste
- State: Maranhão
- Mesoregion: Leste Maranhense

Population (2020)
  - Total: 35,008
- Time zone: UTC−3 (BRT)

Parnarama is a municipality in the state of Maranhão in the Northeast region of Brazil.

== See also ==
- List of municipalities in Maranhão
