= Alexander Mendoza =

Salvadoran footballer (born 1990)

Personal information
- Full name: Alexander Enrique Mendoza Rodas
- Date of birth: June 4, 1990 (age 36)
- Place of birth: Acajutla, Sonsonate, El Salvador
- Height: 1.75 m (5 ft 9 in)
- Position: Defender

Team information
- Current team: Santa Tecla
- Number: 5

Senior career*
Years	Team	Apps	(Gls)
2006–2008	Nejapa		
2009	Vendaval		
2009–2012	UES	67	(0)
2012–2017	FAS	137	(4)
2017–	Santa Tecla		

International career
2012–	El Salvador	31	(0)
- * Club domestic league appearances and goals as of 17 February 2021

Alexander Enrique Mendoza Rodas (born June 4, 1990) is a Salvadoran professional footballer who plays as a defender.
