= Herbert Sosa =

Salvadoran footballer (born 1990)

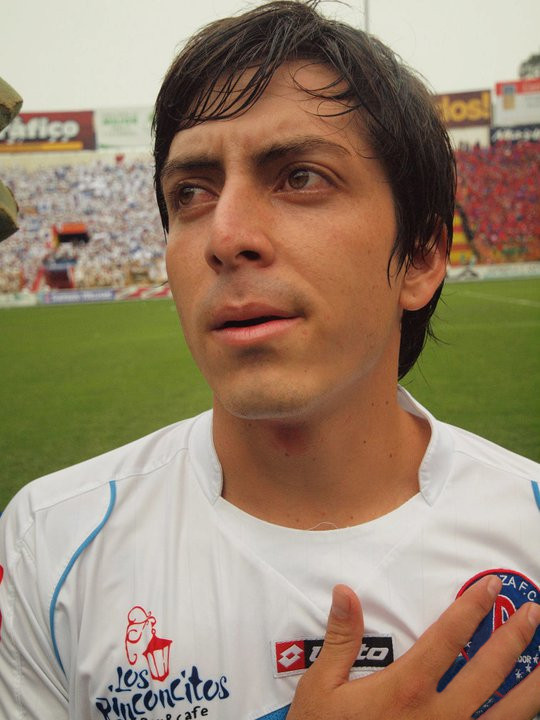
- Sosa with Alianza in 2011

Personal information
- Full name: Herbert Arnoldo Sosa Burgos
- Date of birth: January 11, 1990 (age 36)
- Place of birth: San Salvador, El Salvador
- Height: 1.66 m (5 ft 5 in)
- Position: Midfielder

Youth career
- 2002–2007: FundaMágico

Senior career*
Years	Team	Apps	(Gls)
2007–2008	C.D. Chalatenango	7	(0)
2008–2019	Alianza F.C.		
2014–2015	→ Juventud Independiente (loan)	33	(8)
2019–2020	Santa Tecla FC	25	(5)
2020	A.D. Isidro Metapán	16	(2)

International career
2006–2007	El Salvador U17		
2008–	El Salvador U20	3	(1)
2010–	El Salvador	19	(2)
- * Club domestic league appearances and goals as of 17 February 2021

Herbert Arnoldo Sosa Burgos (born 11 January 1990) is a Salvadoran professional footballer who plays as a midfielder.

== Club career ==
Sosa's professional career began in July 2007, when he signed a contract with Chalatenango. He officially made his debut on September 23, 2007, in a league match against Once Municipal.

== International career ==
Sosa made his debut for El Salvador in an October 2010 friendly match against Panama and scored his first goal in a friendly against Venezuela from a free kick.

His team ended up winning the game 2–1 with a late goal from Edwin Sánchez. Sosa also made history by scoring El Salvador's 1000th international goal in his penalty kick against the Cayman Islands.

He has, as of February 2012, earned a total of 7 caps, scoring 2 goals and has represented his country in 3 FIFA World Cup qualification matches and played at the 2011 UNCAF Nations Cup.

== Career statistics ==
=== Club ===
As of 7 February 2009.

Club	Season	League		League Cup		Continental		Other		Total	
Club	Season	Apps	Goals	Apps	Goals	Apps	Goals	Apps	Goals	Apps	Goals
Chalatenango	Apertura 2007	3	0	–		0	0	0	0	3	0
Chalatenango	Clausura 2008	4	0	–		0	0	0	0	4	0
Alianza	Apertura 2008	1	0	–		0	0	2	0	3	0
Alianza	Clausura 2009	1	0	–		0	0	0	0	1	0
Career total		9	0	–		0	0	2	0	11	0

=== International ===
#	Date	Venue	Opponent	Score	Result	Competition
1	7 August 2011	Robert F. Kennedy Memorial Stadium, Washington, D.C., United States	Venezuela	1–1	2–1	Friendly
2	15 November 2011	Estadio Cuscatlán, San Salvador, El Salvador	Cayman Islands	4–0	4–0	2014 FIFA World Cup qualification
