= Néstor Renderos =

Salvadoran footballer (born 1988)

Nestor Renderos
Personal information
- Full name: Nestor Raul Renderos López
- Date of birth: September 10, 1988 (age 38)
- Place of birth: San Salvador, El Salvador
- Height: 1.80 m (5 ft 11 in)
- Position: Midfielder

Youth career
- 2005: Alianza FC (reserves)

Senior career*
Years	Team	Apps	(Gls)
2005–2010	Alianza FC		
2010–2019	FAS	252	(20)
2016	→ Zakho FC (loan)	18	(0)
2019–2020	Isidro Metapán	26	(0)
2020–2021	FAS	20	(0)
2021-2022	Isidro Metapán	51	(5)
2023	Santa Tecla	41	(5)
2024	Once Deportivo	20	(2)

International career
2013–	El Salvador	35	(0)
- * Club domestic league appearances and goals

Nestor Raul Renderos López (born 10 September 1988) is a Salvadoran professional footballer who plays as a midfielder.

== Club career ==
In 2005, Renderos signed with Alianza F.C.

In 2010, he signed with C.D. FAS. He has not left C.D. FAS despite receiving offers.

In 2016, Renderso was sent on loan to Iraqi club Zakho with an option to buy.

On September 6, 2024 Renderos announced via his social media that he would be retiring from professional football

== Honours ==
FAS

- Primera División runner-up: Clausura 2011, Clausura 2013, Apertura 2013, Apertura 2015
