= Christian Rodriguez =

Association football player (born 1995)

Personal information
- Full name: Christian Alexander Rodríguez
- Date of birth: September 12, 1995 (age 31)
- Place of birth: Washington D.C., United States
- Height: 5 ft 7 in (1.70 m)
- Position: Attacking midfielder

Youth career
- 2009–2012: D.C. United
- 2012–2013: FC Groningen
- 2013: Carolina RailHawks
- 2014–2015: D.C. United

Senior career*
Years	Team	Apps	(Gls)
2015	Fredericksburg FC	3	(0)
2015–2017	FAS	11	(0)
2017	Once Lobos	22	(0)
2018	Tulsa Roughnecks	6	(0)
2019	Independiente FC	6	

International career
	El Salvador U17	1	(0)
	El Salvador U20	3	(0)
- * Club domestic league appearances and goals as of 17:48, 17 October 2018 (UTC)

Christian Alexander Rodríguez Vásquez (born September 12, 1995) is a footballer, who plays as a midfielder. Born in the United States, Rodríguez represents El Salvador internationally.

== Career ==
Rodríguez spent time in with academy's at D.C. United in the United States and FC Groningen in the Netherlands. He also spent time with National Premier Soccer League side Fredericksburg FC in 2015.

Rodríguez signed his first professional contract with El Salvadorean side FAS in 2015. He returned to the United States in January 2018, when he signed for United Soccer League side Tulsa Roughnecks.
