= Eder Arias =

Colombian footballer (born 1983)

Personal information
- Full name: Eder Gilmar Arias Angulo
- Date of birth: 11 April 1983 (age 43)
- Place of birth: Cali, Colombia
- Height: 1.87 m (6 ft 2 in)
- Position: Defender

Senior career*
Years	Team	Apps	(Gls)
2003–2006	América de Cali		
2006–2007	Cortuluá		
2007–2008	Deportes Cartago		
2008–2009	Atlético Colegiales		
2009–2011	W Connection		
2011–2012	Platense		
2012–2013	Victoria	44	(4)
2014–2016	Águila		
2016	Juventud Independiente		
2016–2017	Chalatenango		
- * Club domestic league appearances and goals

Eder Gilmar Arias Angulo (born 11 April 1983) is a Colombian former professional footballer who played as defender.
