= Óscar Jiménez (footballer, born 1979) =

Salvadoran footballer

Personal information
- Full name: Óscar Armando Jiménez Campos
- Date of birth: April 18, 1979 (age 47)
- Place of birth: Ilopango, El Salvador
- Height: 1.70 m (5 ft 7 in)
- Position: Midfielder

Senior career*
Years	Team	Apps	(Gls)
1998–2003	Atlético Marte		
2003–2005	Platense		
2005–2006	Real San Martín		
2006–2007	Once Municipal		
2007–2008	FAS		
2008–2009	Alianza		
2009–2011	Isidro Metapán		
2011	Luis Ángel Firpo		
2012	Once Municipal		
2012–2016	Juventud Independiente		
2016	Chalatenango		
2017	UES		
2017–2019	Municipal Ilopaneco		

International career
2008–2009	El Salvador	24	(0)
- * Club domestic league appearances and goals

Óscar Armando Jiménez Campos (born April 18, 1979) is a Salvadoran former professional footballer who played as a midfielder.

== Club career ==
Jiménez was born in Ilopango, El Salvador. He started his career at Atlético Marte in 1998 and joined Second Division side Platense in 2003. He moved to Real San Martín, also in the second tier two years later, only to sign for Premier Division outfit Once Municipal in 2006. He kept switching clubs every year, playing for FAS and Alianza before ending up at Isidro Metapán.

== International career ==
Jiménez received his first call up to the national team in January 2008. He officially got his first cap on January 22, 2008, in a friendly match against Belize and he has, as of June 2011, earned a total of 24 caps, scoring no goals. He has represented his country in seven FIFA World Cup qualification matches and played at the 2009 UNCAF Nations Cup.

His final international was an August 2009 friendly match against Colombia.
