= Neymer Miranda =

Colombian footballer (born 1985)

Personal information
- Full name: Neymer José Miranda Martínez
- Date of birth: 9 January 1985 (age 41)
- Place of birth: Colombia
- Height: 1.75 m (5 ft 9 in)
- Position: Midfielder

Senior career*
Years	Team	Apps	(Gls)
2004–2005	Real Cartagena		
2006	Expreso Rojo		
2007	Real Cartagena		
2008	Expreso Rojo		
2009–2010	Real Cartagena		
2011–2012	Samba Buenos Aires		
2013–2014	CDC Española		
2014	Once Municipal		
2015	El Roble		
2015–2016	Pasaquina FC		
2016–2018	El Roble		
2018–2019	Pasaquina FC		
2019	Once Deportivo		
- * Club domestic league appearances and goals

Neymer José Miranda Martínez (born 9 January 1985) is a Colombian former professional footballer who played as a midfielder.
