= Ricardinho Paraiba =

Brazilian footballer

Personal information
- Full name: Ricardo Ferreira da Silva
- Date of birth: 31 December 1986 (age 39)
- Place of birth: Colatina, Brazil
- Height: 1.76 m (5 ft 9 in)
- Position: Forward

Senior career*
Years	Team	Apps	(Gls)
2005	Colatinense		
2006	Aracruz		
2007	Corinthians (under 20)		
2007	Olé Brasil		
2008	Corinthians (under 23)		
2008	Valeriodoce		
2009	Corinthians (under 23)		
2009	Nakhon Pathom		
2010	Corinthians (B)		
2010	Noroeste		
2011	Vitoria ES		
2011	Estrela do Norte		
2012	Mineiros		
2012	Águia Negra		
2013	Alecrim		
2013	Desportiva Ferroviária		
2013–2018	Santa Tecla F.C.		
2016	→ Al-Mina'a (loan)		
2019	Isidro Metapan	19	(9)
2019–2020	Santa Tecla F.C.	22	(6)
2020	Isidro Metapan	15	(4)
2021	Atletico Marte	12	(3)
- * Club domestic league appearances and goals

Ricardo Ferreira da Silva (born 31 December 1986) commonly known as Ricardinho or Ricardinho Paraiba, is a Brazilian former professional footballer who played as a forward.

== Career ==
Paraiba signed with Santa Tecla F.C. of the Salvadoran Primera División in 2013.

Paraiba scored a crucial goal in a 1–0 victory against Municipal Limeño in the first leg of the quarterfinals of the Apertura 2018 at the Estadio Jose Ramon Flores, in November 2018.

== Honours ==
Santa Tecla

- Primera División: Clausura 2015, Apertura 2016, Clausura 2017, Apertura 2018; runner-up Apertura 2017, Clausura 2018
