= Óscar Guerrero (footballer) =

Colombian footballer (born 1985)

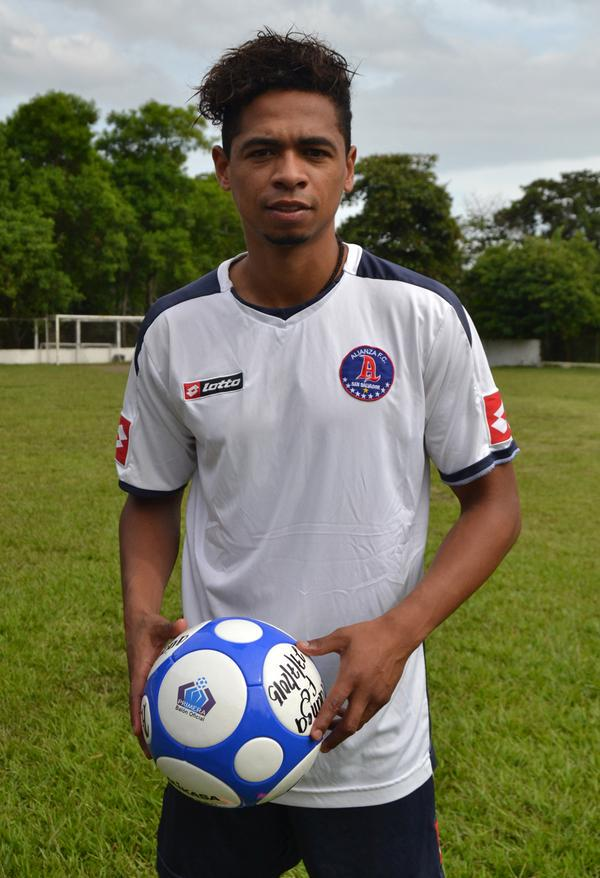

Personal information
- Full name: Óscar Darío Guerrero Alvarado
- Date of birth: 1 March 1985 (age 41)
- Place of birth: Bogotá, Colombia
- Height: 1.70 m (5 ft 7 in)
- Position: Forward

Team information
- Current team: Vittoriosa Stars
- Number: 70

Youth career
- 2000–2005: Academia Compensar

Senior career*
Years	Team	Apps	(Gls)
2006–2007	Academia		
2008	Atlético Bucaramanga		
2008	Pyunik Yerevan	10	(2)
2009	Armenio	3	(0)
2010	Academia		
2010	Cortuluá	8	(1)
2011	Ironi Ramat Hasharon	33	(7)
2012	Hapoel Jerusalem	16	(5)
2012–2013	Maccabi Petah Tikva		
2013–2014	Vittoriosa Stars	31	(14)
2014–2015	Balzan	26	(7)
2015–2016	Alianza		
2017	Aris Limassol	9	(0)
2017	Għajnsielem		
2018	Leones Negros	0	(0)
2018–2019	Potros UAEM	7	(0)
2019–	Vittoriosa Stars	10	(5)
- * Club domestic league appearances and goals

Óscar Darío Guerrero Alvarado (born 1 March 1985), known as Óscar Guerrero, is a Colombian professional footballer, who plays as a forward for Vittoriosa Stars in Malta.

== Personal life ==
Óscar Guerrero is the first children from Janés Guerrero and Lilia Alvarado. His family settled in Bogotá, where he began playing youth football in Academia Compensar, at age 12.

Guerrero made his professional debut in 2005, in the Categoría Primera B with Academia.

Ahead of the 2019–20 season, Guerrero returned to Maltese club Vittoriosa Stars.
