= Irvin Valdez =

Salvadoran footballer (born 1991)

Personal information
- Full name: Irvin Antonio Valdéz Hernández
- Date of birth: February 10, 1991 (age 35)
- Place of birth: Quezaltepeque, Chalatenango, El Salvador
- Height: 1.70 m (5 ft 7 in)
- Position: Forward

Youth career
- 2006–2007: Juventud Independiente (B)

Senior career*
Years	Team	Apps	(Gls)
2007–2015	Juventud Independiente		
2015–2017	CD Águila		
2017	Municipal Limeño		
2017–2018	CD Sonsonate		
2018–2019	San Pablo Municipal		
2019–2020	AD Chalatenango		

International career
2014–	El Salvador		
- * Club domestic league appearances and goals

Irvin Antonio Valdéz Hernández (born February 10, 1991) is a Salvadoran professional footballer who plays as a forward.
