= Iván Garrido (footballer, born 1981) =

Colombian footballer

Personal information
- Full name: Iván Alonso Garrido Pinzón
- Date of birth: 2 June 1981 (age 45)
- Place of birth: Bucaramanga, Colombia
- Height: 1.85 m (6 ft 1 in)
- Position: Centre-back

Senior career*
Years	Team	Apps	(Gls)
2006	Atlético Bucaramanga	36	(3)
2006–2007	Santa Fe	13	(1)
2007–2009	Atlético Bucaramanga	45	(2)
2009–2011	Bnei Yehuda Tel Aviv	48	(0)
2011–2012	Hapoel Be'er Sheva	22	(0)
2012–2014	Atlético Huila	31	(0)
2015	Uniautónoma	13	(0)
2015–2016	Alianza		
- * Club domestic league appearances and goals

Iván Alonso Garrido Pinzón (born 2 June 1981) is a Colombian former professional footballer who played as a centre-back.
