= Jonathan Phillippe =

Argentine footballer

Jonathan Javier Philippe
Personal information
- Full name: Jonathan Javier Philippe
- Date of birth: 24 January 1988 (age 38)
- Place of birth: Navarro, Argentina
- Height: 1.75 m (5 ft 9 in)
- Position: Striker

Youth career
- Boca Juniors

Senior career*
Years	Team	Apps	(Gls)
2008–2012	Boca Juniors	3	(0)
2010	→ San Martín de San Juan (loan)	0	(0)
2010	→ SC Kriens (loan)	28	(8)
2010–2011	→ Ferrocarril Oeste (loan)	17	(6)
2011–2012	→ Sportivo Luqueno (loan)	14	(2)
2012	América de Cali	9	(1)
2012–2013	Argentino de Quilmes	10	(1)
2015	Brown Adrogué	17	(9)
2015–2016	Alianza		
2016–2017	Agrotikos Asteras	31	(8)
- * Club domestic league appearances and goals

Jonathan Javier Philippe (born 24 January 1988) is an Argentine former professional association footballer who played as a striker.

He was signed in 2008 from the youth divisions of Boca Juniors and made his debut on 31 August 2008, in a 3–0 win over Huracán.

== Honours ==
Season	Team	Title
Apertura 2008	Boca Juniors	Primera División Argentina
