= Nestor Asprilla =

Colombian footballer (born 1986)

Personal information
- Full name: Nestor Alberto Asprilla Murillo
- Date of birth: 28 January 1986 (age 40)
- Place of birth: Palmira, Valle del Cauca, Colombia
- Height: 1.90 m (6 ft 3 in)
- Position: Centre-back

Senior career*
Years	Team	Apps	(Gls)
2006–2007	Girardot		
2008	Expreso Rojo		
2009	Atlético Juventud		
2010–2011	Atlético Huila	6	(0)
2011	FBC Melgar	10	(0)
2012–2013	Fortaleza		
2013–2014	Chorrillo		
2015	Atlético Marte		
2015–2016	Deportivo Malacateco	9	(0)
2017–2018	Bogotá FC		
- * Club domestic league appearances and goals

Nestor Alberto Asprilla Murillo (born 28 January 1986) is a Colombian former professional footballer who played as a centre-back.

== Career ==
In January 2015 signed with Salvadoran side Atlético Marte.
