= Daniel Fernández (football manager, born 1963) =

Argentine footballer

Personal information
- Full name: Daniel Marcelo Fernández Tocci
- Date of birth: March 7, 1963 (age 63)
- Place of birth: Buenos Aires, Argentina
- Position: Midfielder

Managerial career
- Years: Team
- 1997–1998: River Plate (Under sub 17)
- 1998–1999: Nacional (Under sub 17)
- 2000–2005: Mora (Under sub 17)
- 2000–2005: Plaza Colonia
- 2006–2010: Central Español
- 2011–2012: Turín FESA FC
- 2013–2014: Atlético Marte (Under 17s)
- 2015: Atlético Marte
- 2015–2016: Alianza FC (Under 17s)
- 2016: Alianza FC
- 2016: Alianza FC (sport director)

Daniel Marcelo Fernández Tocci (born 7 March 1963) is a former Argentine professional football midfielder. After retiring as a player he coached teams in El Salvador.

== Coaching career ==
=== Atlético Marte ===
In February 2015, Fernández signed as new coach of Atlético Marte, replacing Gabriel Álvarez. In June 2015, Fernández was replaced by Carlos Antonio Meléndez.

=== Alianza ===
In February 2016, Fernández signed as new coach of Alianza for the rest of the Clausura 2016 tournament, replacing Rubén Alonso. In August 2016, Fernández was replaced by Milton Meléndez.
