= Juventud Independiente (1943) =

Association football club in El Salvador

Coordinates: 13°52′44″N 89°21′38″W

- Full name: Club Deportivo Juventud Independiente
- Nicknames: La Marea Roja; Los Arqueológicos
- Founded: 7 September 1943
- Dissolved: 2016; 10 years ago
- Ground: Complejo Municipal, San Juan Opico, La Libertad
- Capacity: 5,000
- League: ADFA
- Website: http://juventudindependiente.com/
Home colours	Away colours

Club Deportivo Juventud Independiente, also commonly known as Juventud Independiente, was a professional Salvadoran football club, based in San Juan Opico, La Libertad, El Salvador. Founded on 7 September 1943, holding home matches at Complejo Municipal. The one time primera division side enjoyed its greatest successes in the 2010s, but following financial troubles and selling their spot to Luis Ángel Firpo, the club currently plays in the 4th division, Tercera División.

== History ==
=== The beginning ===
In 1940, Vicente Rocha a community leader, decided to begin an elaborate health project for the young people in his community of opico and realised quite quickly that forming a football club would help his cause. He shared his vision with a group of people which included Vicente Trujillo and Benjamín Hernández.

After raising the necessary funds, they baptized the club as a Unión. The club recruited their players from the local schools and due to the age of their players being under the set limit, they were registered in the Liga burocrática (the Lowest Level in the footballing system). The team officially was born on 7 September 1943 and, because they signed the document in the Ministerio del Interior, the team leaders decided to name the club Juventud Independiente in representation of both the young players and the historic building where the club was formed. Vicente Rocha become the team's first president and the team played their first games in the San Juan Opico region; and despite the already established club Fuerte Cuscatleco team being based there for several years, the community supported Juventud Independiente in large numbers.

The team's primary player during this period was Casto de Jesús Flores, who was one of the first players to sign for the club. The club battled hard and by the early 1970s they had reached both the third and then the second division.

=== During the war ===
The civil war that occurred in El Salvador during the 1980s affected Juventud Independiente, as players fled the country and the sheer danger of watching the games kept fans away. In 1989 just before a promotion play-off against San Rafael Cedros, a major offensive was launched and many players fled the country causing Juventud Independiente to lose the match. The team's fortunes improved in the early 1990s as the team recruited better players and were able to starve off relegation and remain in the Segunda División for a few years before finally succumbing to their demise by being relegating in 1991.

=== Rebuilding ===
During the nineties, the team expanded and reached second division for the first time in several years after defeating Juventud Olímpica 5–1 on aggregate.

The team directive decided to form a football school in 1994. The desire and aim was to provide a strong basis for the senior team and improve the standards of their young players. However, during this period the team descended back to the third division.

After community election in 1997, Romeo Barillas was elected and began programs and projects to support the team. Barillas first move was to sign Ramon Sanchez, who had just finished coaching Arcense. Ramon Sanchez worked hard with the young players of Juventud Independiente and eventually reached the play-off. The team won on their second attempt and were promoted to second division, beginning the emergence of young stars Henry López and Carlos Asprilla.

After securing a spot in the second division, they were able to sign foreign players such as Rodrigo Lagos, Fainor Viáfara and Carlos Escalante. In the 2004–05 season they reached the semi-finals but were eliminated by Coca-Cola. In 2006–07 season they made the finals, but lost to Nejapa and lost the play-off against Once Municipal.

Ramon Sanchez left the club for the first division club, Chalatenango. Ramon Sanchez's ten-year reign had come to an end. The board selected Jorge Ábrego to coach the team and despite losing automatic qualification to the first division, They won promotion from Segunda División de Fútbol Salvadoreño to Primera División de Fútbol de El Salvador after beating San Salvador 4–2 in the play-off series which allowed Juventud to qualify to the first division for the first time in the club history.

=== Recent events ===
However the club failed to achieve any real progress in the first division having the worst record in the apertura and clausura seasons, the club failed to remain in the first division and this was despite the purchase of players such as Honduran Nestor Steve Reyes, Argentinian Lucas Abraham and Colombian Luis Jose Perez, coupled with the hiring of their longtime coach Juan Ramon Sanchez the club were still relegated. The club spent the next few seasons trying to regain promotion to the first division, they made several second division semi-finals and grand finals but always falling short, however the club finally succeeded when they won the Clausura 2011 title defeating Once Lobos 4–0, then winning the grand champion final defeating Titan of Santa Ana 3–2 in extra time with the club were promoted back to the Primera Division.

For the following three season (between 2011 Apertura to 2012 Apertura) Juventud remained a mid table team with their highest finish being sixth. However, this changed in the 2013 Clausura when the club were able to qualify to the semi-finals as the fourth placed team after winning a dramatic play-off with Santa Tecla 1–0. In the semi-finals Juventud lost to FAS despite drawing the series 2–2 because of FAS scoring an away they were able to progress on the away goal rule.

Following their successful campaign Juventud backed it up the very next season finishing 2nd on the league table with 30 points and scoring 40 goals breaking the club previous best record in the Primera División de Fútbol de El Salvador. This was largely due to the new addition of Nigerian Agustin Jibirin, David Antonio Rugamas, top goalscorer for the season Uruguayan Jesus Toscanini, and Jose Luis Gonzales. Meanwhile, Oscar Ceren, Irvin Valdez, Juan Carlos Portillo and Wilber Ramirez had breakout season.

In the semi-finals, they were forced to play FAS again and once again they were defeated by FAS, 4–3 on aggregate.

In December 2015, due to financial trouble, Juventud sold their spot in the Primera División to Firpo. Because the club failed to fill out the necessary paperwork to compete in the Second Division before the 2016 deadline, Juventud Independiente did not compete during the 2016 season.

== Sponsorship ==
Period	Kit manufacturer	Shirt sponsor
2011–2013 2014–	Milàn Sport	TCS
2013–2014	Milàn Sport	Milàn Sport

== Honours ==
=== Domestic honours ===
==== Leagues ====
- Segunda División and predecessors
  - Champions (2) : Clausura 2008, Clausura 2011
- Tercera División Salvadorean and predecessors
  - Champions (2) : N/A
  - Play-off winner (2):
- La Asociación Departamental de Fútbol Aficionado' and predecessors (4th tier)
  - Champions (1):
  - Play-off winner (2):

== Current squad ==
As of September 2025

Note: Flags indicate national team as defined under FIFA eligibility rules; some limited exceptions apply. Players may hold more than one non-FIFA nationality.

No.	Pos.	Nation	Player
1		ESA	Cristian Mejia
2		ESA	Juan Gonzalez
3		ESA	Elmer Molina
4		ESA	Alexis Melendez
5		ESA	Carlos Alavrado
6		ESA	Gerson Ayala
7		ESA	Cesar Chicas
9		ESA	Samuel Flores
10		ESA	Marcos Cascarita
11		ESA	Johnathan Alavrado
12		ESA	Geovaani Molina
14		ESA	William Valencia

No.	Pos.	Nation	Player
15		ESA	Cristian Galdamez
16		ESA	Carlos Mejia
17		ESA	Armando Valencia
19		ESA	Cesar Trejo
20		ESA	Edgardo Mejia
21		ESA	Stanley Gallegos
22		ESA	Rene Urbina
24		ESA	Dario Bonilla
26		ESA	Josue Sibrian
27		ESA	Ulises Herrera
30		ESA	Rodrigo Herrera
—		ESA	TBD (captain)

== Personnel ==
=== Management ===
Position	Staff
Owner	(El Salvador)
President	(El Salvador) Romeo Barillas
Vice President	(El Salvador) René García Santa Maria
Secretary	(El Salvador) Julian Armando Umaña
Assistant Secretary	(El Salvador) Antonio Trujillo
Treasurer	(El Salvador) Miguel Angel Rodas
Assistant Secretary	(El Salvador) Juan Carlos Argumedo
Trustee	(El Salvador) Casto de Jesús Flores
Board of directors	(El Salvador) Camilo de Jesús Ramírez
Board of directors	(El Salvador) Antonio Guardado
Board of directors	(El Salvador) Antonio Rivera

== List of coaches ==
Name	From	To
(El Salvador) Ramón Sánchez	1997	December 2007
(El Salvador) Jorge Abrego	January 2008	November 14, 2008
(El Salvador) Ramón Sánchez	December 2008	May 2015
(El Salvador) Jorge Abrego	June 2015	December 2015
(El Salvador) Bairon García	2018	2019

== League season performance ==
(Apertura 2007 – Apertura 2015)

Season	League	Position	GP	W	D	L	GF	GA	PTS	Playoffs	Pl.	W	D	L	GS	GA	PTS
Apertura 2008	Primera División de Fútbol de El Salvador (La Primera)	8th	18	4	7	7	21	35	19	did not qualify	-	-	-	-	-	-	-
Clausura 2009	La Primera	10th	18	3	3	12	11	31	12	did not qualify	-	-	-	-	-	-	-
Apertura 2011	La Primera	8th	18	5	2	11	18	30	17	did not qualify	-	-	-	-	-	-	-
Clausura 2012	La Primera	6th	18	6	7	5	31	24	25	did not qualify	-	-	-	-	-	-	-
Apertura 2012	La Primera	9th	18	4	7	7	27	34	19	did not qualify	-	-	-	-	-	-	-
Clausura 2013	La Primera	4th	18	8	5	5	31	20	29	Semi-finalists	2	1	0	1	2	2	3
Apertura 2013	La Primera	2nd	18	8	6	4	40	23	30	Semi-finalists	2	0	1	1	3	4	1
Clausura 2014	La Primera	3rd	18	8	5	5	28	24	29	Semi-finalists	2	0	1	1	2	4	1
Apertura 2014	La Primera	5th	18	7	4	7	26	24	25	did not qualify	-	-	-	-	-	-	-
Clausura 2015	La Primera	2nd	18	9	2	7	26	22	29	Semi-finalists	2	0	1	1	4	6	1
Apertura 2015	La Primera	9th	22	5	7	10	20	33	22	did not qualify	-	-	-	-	-	-	-

== Club records ==
- Irvin Valdez is the team highest goalscorer in the primera division with 29 goals Javier Valdez, un guía en el infierno
- Biggest loss: 10-0 vs. Aguila (August 23, 2008)

=== Most appearances ===
As of February, 2025

No.	Player	period	Appearances
1	(El Salvador) Yuvini Salamanca	2010-2015	127
2	(El Salvador) Irvin Valdez	2007–2015	117
3	(El Salvador) Óscar Jiménez	2012–2016	117
4	(El Salvador) Óscar Cerén	2009–2014	110
5	(El Salvador) Juan Carlos Portillo	2012–2015	102
6	(El Salvador) Darwin Ceren	2009–2014	87
