= Santa Tecla FC =

Association football club in El Salvador

Santa Tecla F.C.
- Full name: Santa Tecla Fútbol Club
- Nicknames: Periquitos; Tecleños; Los Verdes
- Founded: 15 January 2007; 19 years ago
- Dissolved: 25 March 2025; 19 months ago
- Ground: Estadio Las Delicias
- Capacity: 10,000
- Chairman: (El Salvador) Eduardo Amaya de Leon
- Manager: (El Salvador) Juan Ramón Sánchez
- League: (El Salvador) Segunda División
- 2023 Clausura: Overall: 9th Playoffs: Did not qualify
Home colours	Away colours

Santa Tecla Fútbol Club was a Salvadoran multi-sport club based in Santa Tecla since being formed in 2007. Although they competed in a number of different sports, Santa Tecla was mostly known for its professional association football team. The club competed in Primera División de Fútbol de El Salvador, the nation's top tier, since being promoted there for Apertura 2012. Santa Tecla was founded in 2007, its home games were at the 10,000 capacity soccer-specific Estadio Las Delicias.

== History ==
Santa Tecla Fútbol Club was formed in 2007 as a means for the "Tecleños" citizens to support a local team. It had been almost 40 years since the demise of former league champions Quequeisque.

They took over the Telecom FC licence and made their debut in professional football in the 2007–08 season. During their first competitive season, the team managed to reach the quarterfinals of the tournament.

=== Promotion to La Primera ===
Santa Tecla won their first title in 2012, winning the 2012 Apertura second division title by defeating Brasilia 2–1. A week later Santa Tecla defeated Titán (the champion of the 2011 Clausura title) 2–1 with goals by William Maldonado and Roberto González, allowing for Santa Tecla to be promoted to the Primera División de Fútbol de El Salvador (La Primera) for the first time in club history.

=== Champions ===
In 2015, the club had its most successful period in its history under the guidance of Argentinian Osvaldo Escudero. The club were able to win their first championship (the Clausura 2015) in club history. Santa Tecla won on a penalty shootout 3–1 after the match finished 1–1; William Maldonado was the lone goal-scorer for Santa Tecla in the final.

=== Second championship ===
Santa Tecla finished in third place in the regular season, advancing to the 2016 Apertura Playoffs, where they met Isidro Metapán in the first round. They drew the first leg 2–2, but Santa Tecla won the second leg to win 3–2 on aggregate. Santa Tecla faced Águila in the semi-final, winning 4–3 on aggregate to advance to La Primera's championship game. Santa Tecla faced Alianza F.C. for the championship. Santa Tecla won 3–2 on a game-winning brace by Sebastián Abreu in the second half, with Gerson Mayen scoring the other goal in the first half, thus winning their second Primera División title.

=== Third championship ===
Santa Tecla finished in third place in the regular season, advancing to the 2017 Clausura Playoffs, where they met C.D. FAS in the first round. They drew the first leg 0–0, but Santa Tecla won the second leg at Estadio Las Delicias 1–0, to win 1–0 on aggregate. Santa Tecla faced Águila in the semi-final, winning 5–2 on aggregate to advance to the championship game. Santa Tecla faced the Alianza F.C. for the championship for the second straight tournament. Santa Tecla once again won the Primera División title with a comprehensive 4–0 victory, with Marlón Cornejo, Gerson Mayen William Canales and Carlos Bueno.

=== Contenders and fourth championship ===
Following their third Primera División championship, the team made two consecutive finals (Apertura 2017 and Clausura 2018) against Alianza F.C., losing 4–1 and 1–0 respectively. During that period they were coached by Argentinian Ernesto Corti and Uruguayan Rubén da Silva. On 16 December 2018, Santa tecla won their fourth Primera División championship, defeating their rival Alianza F.C. 2–1 thanks to a double from Wilma Torres. The title end their recent losses and dominance by Alianza in the finals.

=== Recent events ===
The club's finances were heavily impacted by the death of the club president José Vidal Hernández and the COVID-19 pandemic. As an ongoing consequence, the club were restricted in their spending focusing on selling their experienced players and focusing on their youth players. The club went from being title contenders to fighting for survival.

Juan Ramón Sánchez left the club in February 2024 via mutual consent, with ten games remaining and the team in the relegation zone. Francisco Medrano was appointed as his replacement until the end of the season. On 28 April 2024, Santa Tecla were relegated as a consequence of their 2–1 loss against C.D. Luis Ángel Firpo. This ended the club's twelve-year stint in the Primera División, making them only the fifth former Primera División champions to be relegated from the league since it began in Apertura-Clausura, following C.D. Vista Hermosa, Once Municipal, C.D. Dragón, C.D. Luis Ángel Firpo and Atlético Marte.

=== Disbandment ===
On March 25th 2025, It was announced by Comisión Disciplinaria de la Federación Salvadoreña de Fútbol (FESFUT) that the club will be banned from all levels of Salvadoran football and disbanded, while boards members Max Miguel Ayala Revelo (president), Jorge Italo Argueta Osorio (vice-president), Mario Enrique Monico Chavarría (secretary), Sonia Luz Alas de Valladares (treasurer), Juan Ramón Molina (trustee), Boris Ernesto Romero Castro (first director) and Juan Carlos Cruz Orellana (second director) were banned from all football related activities for 10 years.

== Stadium ==
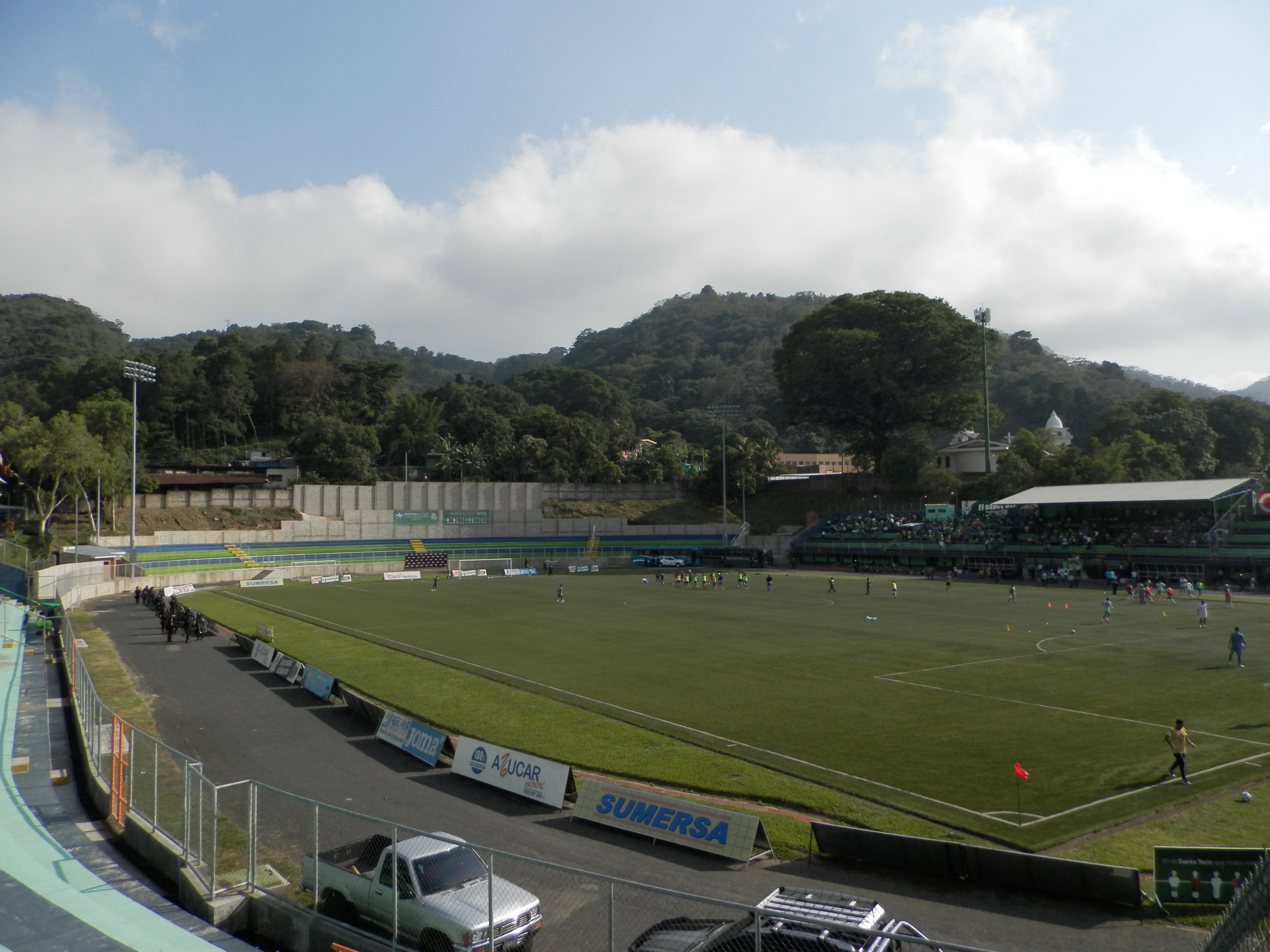

- Estadio Las Delicias (2007–2024)
  - Estadio Jorge "Mágico" González; San Salvador (2012) played in TBD during Estadio Las Delicias renovation.
  - Estadio Universitario UES; San Salvador (2019, 2023-present) played in Clausura 2019 during Estadio Las Delicias renovation.
  - Estadio Cuscatlán; San Salvador (2019–2020) played in Clausura 2019 during Estadio Las Delicias renovation and again in Apertura 2020 due to dispute with INDES the owner of the stadium.
  - Estadio Anna Mercedes Campos; Sonsonate (2023–2024) played for both the Apertura/Clausura 2023 season while the Estadio Las Delicias renovation

Santa Tecla Fútbol Club has forged its entire history, from 2007 to the present, in the Estadio Las Delicias, but during stadium renovations they played their matches in the Estadio Jorge "Mágico" González and Estadio Universitario UES.

== Sponsorship ==
Companies that Santa Tecla FC currently has sponsorship deals with for 2023–2024 includes:

- AriJam – Official kit suppliers
- Electrolit – Official sponsors
- Sistema Fedecredito – Official sponsors
- Las Perlitas – Official sponsors
- Plaza Merlot – Official sponsors
- Transportes Galindo – Official sponsors
- ElQuijote – Official sponsors
- Laboratorios Proquifar – Official sponsors

== Honours ==
=== Domestic honours ===
==== Leagues ====
- Primera División de Fútbol de El Salvador and predecessors
  - Champions (4): Clausura 2015, Apertura 2016, Clausura 2017, Apertura 2018
- Segunda División Salvadorean and predecessors
  - Champions (1): Clausura 2012

==== Cups ====
- Copa El Salvador and predecessors
  - Champions (2): 2016–17, 2018–19

==== Minor Cups ====
- Jaguar Sportic Cup
  - Champions (1): 2015–16

== Current squad ==
As of July, 2024. Note: Flags indicate national team as defined under FIFA eligibility rules; some limited exceptions apply. Players may hold more than one non-FIFA nationality.

No.	Pos.	Nation	Player
2	DF	ARG	Alejandro Frezzotti
6		ESA	Kevin Garay
7		ESA	Anthony Roque (captain)
9	FW	ARG	Gonzalo Tarifa
11		ARG	Adrian Toloza
15		ESA	Brayan Erazo
16		ESA	Rodrigo Rodriguez
21		ESA	Aquiles Méndez (captain)
25	GK	ESA	Cristopher Rauda
28		ESA	Emerson Mancia
—		ESA	Balmore Ernesto Pineda
—		ESA	Gil Adonay Sanchez
—	MF	ESA	Fernando Sanchez
—		ESA	Joaquin Montoya

No.	Pos.	Nation	Player
3	DF	ESA	Edwin Cordova
6		ESA	Carlos Alfaro
17		ESA	Mauricio Aldair Perez
22	MF	ESA	Jeffry Aguilar
—		ESA	A Rodríguez
25		ESA	Erick Vega
31		ESA	Allan Acevedo
36	DF	ESA	Alejandro Serrano

=== Out on loan ===
Note: Flags indicate national team as defined under FIFA eligibility rules; some limited exceptions apply. Players may hold more than one non-FIFA nationality.

No.	Pos.	Nation	Player
—		ESA	TBD (at TBD for the 2023-24 Apertura and Clausura)

=== In ===
Note: Flags indicate national team as defined under FIFA eligibility rules; some limited exceptions apply. Players may hold more than one non-FIFA nationality.

No.	Pos.	Nation	Player
—		ESA	TBD (From TBD)
—		ESA	TBD (From TBD)
—		ESA	TBD (From TBD)

No.	Pos.	Nation	Player
—		ESA	TBD (From TBD)
—		ESA	TBD (From TBD)
—		ESA	TBD (From TBD)

Roberto Llamas

=== Out ===
Note: Flags indicate national team as defined under FIFA eligibility rules; some limited exceptions apply. Players may hold more than one non-FIFA nationality.

No.	Pos.	Nation	Player
—		ESA	Cesar Orellana (To LA Firpo)
—		ESA	Andres Rivas (To Alianza)
—		ESA	Allan Ocon (To FAS)
—		ESA	Samuel Rosales (To FAS)
—		ESA	Mario Martinez (To FAS)
—		ESA	Diego Lemus (To Platense)
—		ESA	William Flores (To Once Deportivo)

No.	Pos.	Nation	Player
—		ESA	Ángel Ortega (To Once Deportivo)
—		ESA	Gabriel Velasquez (To Once Deportivo)
—		ESA	(To TBD)
—		ESA	(To TBD)
—		ESA	(To TBD)

== Coaching staff ==
As of April 4, 2024

Position	Staff
Manager	(El Salvador) Francisco Medrano (*)
Assistant Manager	(El Salvador) Rodrigo Vanegas *
Assistant Manager	(El Salvador) TBD *
Reserve Manager	(El Salvador) Rodrigo Vanegas *
Under 17 Manager	(El Salvador) Douglas Vidal Jiménez *
Under 15 Manager	(El Salvador) TBD *
Goalkeeping Coach	(El Salvador) TBD *
Fitness Coach	(El Salvador) Josué Martínez *
Team Doctor	(El Salvador) Isela García
Kinesiologist	(El Salvador) Hector Bermudez
Utility	(El Salvador) David Ernesto Guevara
Utility	(El Salvador) William Antonio Velázquez
Sporting Director	(Argentina) Fernando Ledesma (*)

== Personnel ==
=== Management ===
Position	Staff
Honorary President	(El Salvador) José Eduardo Amaya
President	(El Salvador) Eduardo Amaya de Leon
Vice President	(El Salvador) Jorge Italo Argueta *
Management Representative	(El Salvador) Roberto D'Aubuisson
Administrative Manager	(El Salvador) Rene Guevara
Board Director	(El Salvador) Guillermo Figueroa
Board Director	(El Salvador) Oscar Ortiz
Legal Representation	(El Salvador) Max Ayala Revelo
General Director	(El Salvador) Enrique Monico *
Board Director	(El Salvador)
Board Director	(El Salvador)
Board Director	(El Salvador)

=== Presidential history ===
Name	Years
(El Salvador) Raúl Góchez	2007
(El Salvador) Óscar Ortiz	2012–2014
(El Salvador) José Vidal Hernández	2014–2018
(El Salvador) Guillermo Figueroa	2018–2019
(El Salvador) José Eduardo Amaya	2020-Present

== List of notable players ==
=== Captains ===
Name	years
(El Salvador) Pedro Reyes	2012
(El Salvador) Jaime Medina	2012–2013
(El Salvador) Óscar Navarro	2013–2015
(El Salvador) Gerson Mayen	2015–2016
(El Salvador) Diego Chavarría	2016–2017
(El Salvador) Gerson Mayen	2018–2019
(El Salvador) Alexander Méndoza	2020–2021
(El Salvador) Marlon Cornejo	2022
(El Salvador) Gilberto Baires	2022–2023
(El Salvador) Néstor Renderos	2023
(El Salvador) Aquiles Méndez	2024

=== World Cup players ===
Players that have played for Santa Tecla in their career and played in a World Cup:

- (Uruguay) Sebastian Abreu

=== Copa America players ===
Players that have played for Santa Tecla in their career and played in a Copa America:

- (Uruguay) Sebastian Abreu
- (Uruguay) Carlos Bueno

=== Players with 50 or more goals/appearances for Santa Tecla ===
Includes competitive appearances only. Current players in bold

- (Brazil) Ricardinho (207 games, 80 goals)
- (El Salvador) Juan Barahona (190 games)
- (El Salvador) Gerson Mayen (180 games)
- (El Salvador) Marlon Cornejo (148 games)
- (El Salvador) Bryan Tamacas (153 games)
- (Mexico) Joel Almeida (139 games)
- (El Salvador) Alexander Mendoza (130 games)
- (El Salvador) Gilberto Baires (113 games)
- (Argentina) Facundo Simioli (83 games)
- (El Salvador) Rodrigo Rivera (74 games)

== List of coaches ==
Santa Tecla has had 20 permanent managers since it first appointed Armando Contreras Palma as coach in 2007. The longest serving manager was Osvaldo Escudero, who managed Santa Tecla for two years from May 2014 to May 2016. Edgar Henríquez "Kiko" won the club's first title, winning the Segunda División title in 2011, while Osvaldo Escudero "El Pichi" won the club's first Primera División de Fútbol de El Salvador (La Primera) title in 2015. This was followed by Ernesto Corti, who coached then to a second (2016) and third (2017) consecutive La Primera titles. Corti also won Copa El Salvador in 2017. Argentinian Christian Díaz made it four consecutive with the 2018 Apertura title. The current coach is Salvadorian Juan Ramón Sánchez.

Name	From	To
(El Salvador) Armando Contreras Palma	2007	2007
(El Salvador) Jorge Alberto Perez Quezada	2008	Nov 2009
(El Salvador) Leonel Cárcamo	Nov 2009	Feb 2010
(El Salvador) Efren Marenco	Feb 2010	July 2010
(El Salvador) Armando Contreras Palma	Aug 2010	Oct 2010
(El Salvador) Jorge Búcaro	Oct 2010	Dec 2010
(Uruguay) Rubén Alonso	Dec 2010	Nov 2011
(El Salvador) Edgar Henríquez "Kiko"	Dec 2011	June 2012
(Argentina) Osvaldo Escudero "El Pichi"	June 2012	Oct 2012
(El Salvador) Guillermo Rivera	Oct 2012	Dec 2012
(El Salvador) William Renderos Iraheta	Dec 2012	Sept 2013
(El Salvador) Edgar Henríquez "Kiko"	Sept 2013	May 2014
(Argentina) Osvaldo Escudero "El Pichi"	May 2014	May 2016
(Argentina) Ernesto Corti	June 2016	December 2017
(Uruguay) Rubén da Silva	December 2017	June 2018
(Argentina) Christian Díaz	June 2018	April 2019
(El Salvador) Rodolfo Gochez (Interim)	April 2019	April 2019
(Uruguay) Sebastian Abreu	April 2019	May 2019
(El Salvador) Rodolfo Gochez	May 2019	August 2019
(El Salvador) Leonel Cárcamo (Interim)	August 2019	September 2019
(Mexico) Marco Sánchez Yacuta	September 2019	January 2020
(Argentina) Osvaldo Escudero "El Pichi"	January 2020	July 2020
(Argentina) Juan Andrés Sarulyte	August 2020	October 2020
(El Salvador) Jaime Medina (Interim)	October 2020	January 2021
(Uruguay) Rubén da Silva	January 2021	September 2021
(El Salvador) Rodolfo Góchez (Interim)	September 2021	December 2021
(Uruguay) Daniel Bartolotta	December 2021	March 2022
(El Salvador) Leonel Cárcamo	March 2022	June 2022
(Argentina) Ernesto Corti	June 2022	May 2023
(El Salvador) Francisco Medrano	July 2023	October 2023
(El Salvador) Juan Ramón Sánchez	October 2023	April 2024
(El Salvador) Francisco Medrano	April 2024	July 2024
Hiatus	July 2024	Present

== Club records ==
The Mexican goalkepper Joel Almeida holds Santa Tecla overall appearance record having played in 223 matches over the course of 8 seasons from 2015 to 2020 and 2022 to 2023. Following him is former defeneder Juan Barahona who contested 222 matches over the course of 11 seasons from 1997 to 2008.

The club's all-time leading scorer is Brazilian Ricardo Ferreira, who scored 81 goals while at the club from 2013 to 2018 and 2019 to 2020. Ricardo Ferreira is also third behind Joel Almeida and Juan Barahona in all time appearances having played in TBD matches during his 8-year stint at the club. Brazilian Ricardo Ferreira hold the record for most goals scored during a league season for Santa Tecla, he notched 10 goals, which he attained in the TBD season.

Santa Tecla's biggest league victory is 8–0 which occurred during the 2016 season against Pasaquina. Santa Tecla biggest victory in the Copa El Salvador 6-1 Escuela de Fútbol de Guazapa in 2016-2017 edition of the competition. The club's biggest victory on the CONCACAF stage occurred during the 1995 season, where Santa Tecla defeated American-based club Seattle Sounders FC 2–1.

Argentinian Osvaldo Escudero had the longest reign as Santa Tecla coach, with two years and six months (two consecutive) in charge, while Argentinian Ernesto Corti is the most successful coach in Santa Tecla history with two Primera division wins (Apertura 2016, Clausura 2017) and one Copa El Salvador (2016–2017) title.

- First victory for Santa Tecla 2–1 Once Municipal, 6 August 2012
- Record League victory: 8-0 v Pasaquina, Primera division, 14 February 2016
- Record League Defeat: 1-7 v Alianza, Primera division, 22 July 2012
- First match (Segunda division): Santa Tecla 6–2 Turin FESA, August 4, 2007.

=== International level ===
- As of 24 January 2023

Opponent	First meeting	Last Meeting	Pld	W	D	L	GF	GA	GD
(Guatemala) Municipal	August 20, 2015	August 25, 2015	2	0	1	1	2	3	−1
(United States) Real Salt Lake	September 15, 2015	September 24, 2015	2	0	1	1	1	2	−1
(United States) Seattle Sounders FC	February, 2018	March 2018	2	1	0	1	2	5	−3
(Costa Rica) Herediano	August 2, 2018	August 2018	2	1	0	1	2	2	0
(Nicaragua) Real Esteli	30 July 2019	6 August 2019	2	1	0	1	2	2	0
(Costa Rica) San Carlos	20 August 2019	27 August 2019	2	0	2	0	0	0	0
Totals			0	0	0	0	0	0	0

== League season performance ==
Primera División de Fútbol de El Salvador (La Primera): (Apertura 2012 – Clausura 2024)

Season	League	Position	GP	W	D	L	GF	GA	PTS	Playoffs	Pl.	W	D	L	GS	GA	PTS
Apertura 2012	La Primera	7th	18	5	6	7	24	33	21	Did not qualify	-	-	-	-	-	-	-
Clausura 2013	La Primera	5th	18	8	5	5	24	17	29	Did not qualify	-	-	-	-	-	-	-
Apertura 2013	La Primera	8th	18	4	7	7	24	30	19	Did not qualify	-	-	-	-	-	-	-
Clausura 2014	La Primera	5th	18	7	4	7	25	24	25	Did not qualify	-	-	-	-	-	-	-
Apertura 2014	La Primera	1st	18	8	6	4	20	15	30	Semi-finalist	2	0	1	1	1	2	1
Clausura 2015	La Primera	3rd	18	8	5	5	26	23	29	Champion	3	2	1	0	7	5	7
Apertura 2015	La Primera	4th	22	9	7	6	47	34	34	Quarter-finalist	2	0	1	1	1	2	1
Apertura 2016	La Primera	3rd	22	11	5	6	31	27	38	Champion	5	3	1	1	10	7	10
Clausura 2017	La Primera	3rd	22	9	7	6	36	27	34	Champion	5	4	1	0	10	2	13
Apertura 2017	La Primera	2nd	22	10	9	3	41	23	39	Runner-up	5	1	2	2	3	6	5
Apertura 2018	La Primera	2nd	22	12	7	3	40	12	47	Runner-up	5	2	2	1	6	3	8
Clausura 2018	La Primera	2nd	22	14	5	3	33	18	43	Champion	5	4	1	0	10	5	12
Clausura 2019	La Primera	6th	22	7	9	6	29	30	30	Quarterfinals	2	0	0	2	1	3	0
Apertura 2019	La Primera	6th	22	8	7	7	33	26	31	Semi-finalist	4	1	2	1	4	3	4
Clausura 2020	La Primera	10th	11	2	5	4	11	13	11	Season cancelled	-	-	-	-	-	-	-
Apertura 2020	La Primera	11th	15	2	6	7	12	24	12	Did not qualify	-	-	-	-	-	-	-
Clausura 2021	La Primera	2nd	16	6	4	6	23	24	22	Semi-finalist	4	3	0	1	6	4	9
Apertura 2021	La Primera	10th	22	6	6	10	23	33	24	Did not qualify	-	-	-	-	-	-	-
Clausura 2022	La Primera	12th	22	4	7	11	19	32	19	Did not qualify	-	-	-	-	-	-	-
Apertura 2022	La Primera	9th	10	3	2	5	15	17	11	Did not qualify	-	-	-	-	-	-	-
Clausura 2023	La Primera	9th	22	6	7	9	26	29	25	Did not qualify	-	-	-	-	-	-	-
Apertura 2023	La Primera	12th	22	1	8	13	20	42	11	Did not qualify	-	-	-	-	-	-	-
Clausura 2024	La Primera	10th	22	5	5	12	26	39	20	Did not qualify	-	-	-	-	-	-	-

== Other departments ==
=== Football ===
==== Reserve team ====
The reserve team serves mainly as the final stepping stone for promising young players under the age of 21 before being promoted to the main team. The second team is coached by [ Rodrigo Vanegas. the team played in the Primera División Reserves, their greatest successes were winning the Reserve championships in Clausura 2017, Apertura 2017, Clausura 2019 and Apertura 2021.

Note: Flags indicate national team as defined under FIFA eligibility rules; some limited exceptions apply. Players may hold more than one non-FIFA nationality.

No.	Pos.	Nation	Player
32		ESA	M Perez
33		ESA	A Nerio
35		ESA	Rodrigo Rodríguez
37		ESA	Brandon Amaya
38		ESA	O Guardado
40		ESA	Fernando Sánchez
41		ESA	M Garcia
47		ESA	A Figueroa
48		ESA	W Escobar

No.	Pos.	Nation	Player
52		ESA	M Barahona
54	GK	ESA	J Osorio
57		ESA	Samuel Rosales
63		ESA	B Guevara
65		ESA	W Gutierrez
—		ESA	Andrés Rivas
—		ESA	Aldair Pérez
—		ESA	René Fuentes
—		ESA	Carlos Alfaro

==== Junior teams ====
The youth team (under 17 and under 15) has produced some of El Salvador's top football players, including TBD and TBD. They are currently coached by Douglas Vidal Jiménez

==== Women's team ====
The women's first team, which is led by head coach René David López, features several members of the El Salvador national ladies team including Damaris Quélez (who won golden boot 42 goals). Their greatest successes was winning the 2023 title.

Name	Years	Honours
(El Salvador) TBD	TBD-TBD	
(El Salvador) Carlos Orellana	2019-2021	
(El Salvador) René David López	2021-2024	1 Liga Femenina (2022 Clausura)

=== Other sports ===
Santa Tecla has other departments for a variety of sports.

==== Basketball ====
Santa Tecla Básquetbol Club was founded on 2015 and play Liga Mayor de Baloncesto (LMB) which is the highest level in El Salvador league tier. the club is led by head coach Ernesto “el Colocho” Rodríguez, the club features several key members including Puerto Rican Bryan Vásquez and TBD. Their greatest successes were winning the 2016 Clausura, 2018 Clausura, 2019 Apertura, Apertura 2023

==== Baseball ====
Santa Tecla Béisbol Club was founded on 2016 and play Liga Nacional de Béisbol (LNB) which is the highest level in El Salvador league tier. the club is led by head coach Venezuelan Jesús Cartagena, the club features several key members including Puerto Rican Bryan Vásquez and TBD. Their greatest successes were reaching the TBD

==== Volleyball ====
Santa Tecla Voleibol Club was founded on 2016 and plays in Campeonato Nacional which is the highest level in El Salvador league tier. the club is led by head coach TBD, the club features several key members including TBD and TBD. Their greatest successes were reaching the TBD
