= List of Uruguayan footballers in Serie A =

The list of Uruguayan footballers in Serie A records the association football players from Uruguay who have appeared at least once for a team in the Italian Serie A. Entries in bold denote players still active in actual season.

== A ==
- Julio Abbadie – Genoa, Lecco – 1956–62
- Nelson Abeijón – Cagliari, Atalanta – 1998–2000, 2004–07
- Mathías Abero – Bologna – 2012–13
- Carlos Aguilera – Genoa, Torino – 1989–94
- Rodrigo Aguirre – Empoli, Udinese – 2014–16
- Matias Aguirregaray – Palermo – 2011–12
- Vincente Albanese – Bologna – 1937–38
- Agustín Albarracín – Cagliari – 2025–26
- Emiliano Alfaro – Lazio – 2011–12
- Juan Alberti – Venezia – 1939–47
- Agustín Álvarez – Sassuolo – 2022–23
- Pablo Álvarez – Reggina – 2007–09
- Nicolás Amodio – Napoli – 2008–09
- Germán Antonioli – Fiorentina – 1932–33
- Joaquín Ardaiz – Frosinone – 2018–19
- Felipe Avenatti – Bologna – 2017–18

== B ==
- Jaime Báez – Cremonese, Frosinone – 2022–24
- Raúl Banfi – Modena, Juventus – 1939–40, 1941–42
- Rubén Bentancourt – Atalanta – 2013–14
- Rodrigo Bentancur – Juventus – 2017–22
- Joe Bizera – Cagliari – 2005–08
- Mariano Bogliacino – Napoli, Chievo – 2007–11
- Miguel Britos – Bologna, Napoli – 2008–15
- Gastón Brugman – Palermo, Pescara, Parma – 2015–17, 2019–21

== C ==
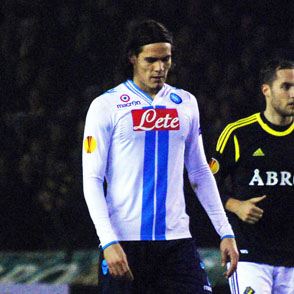
Edinson Cavani has been the 2012–13 Serie A top scorer

- Leandro Cabrera – Crotone – 2017–18
- Matías Cabrera – Cagliari – 2012–14
- Washington Cacciavillani – Pro Patria, Inter – 1955–56, 1957–58
- Martín Cáceres – Juventus, Verona, Lazio, Fiorentina, Cagliari – 2009–10, 2011–16, 2017–22
- Pablo Cáceres – Torino – 2012–13
- Ricardo Canals – Vicenza – 1997–98
- Nelson Cancela – Atalanta – 1956–57
- Dandolo Candales – Napoli – 1947–48
- Jorge Caraballo – Pisa – 1982–83
- Mathías Cardacio – Milan – 2008–09
- Fabián Carini – Inter, Cagliari – 2004–06
- Jorge Daniel Casanova – Lecce – 1999–2000
- Edinson Cavani – Palermo, Napoli – 2006–13
- Pablo Cepellini – Cagliari – 2010–13
- Angel Cerilla – Napoli – 1947–48
- Javier Chevantón – Lecce, Atalanta – 2001–02, 2003–04, 2009–11
- Alejandro Correa – Brescia – 2000–04
- Sebastián Cristóforo – Fiorentina – 2016–18, 2019–20

== D ==
- Héctor Demarco – Bologna, Vicenza – 1959–68

== F ==
- César Falletti – Bologna – 2017–18
- Maximiliano Faotto – Palermo, Lazio, Napoli – 1932–36, 1937–42
- Daniel Fonseca – Cagliari, Napoli, Roma, Juventus, Como – 1990–99, 2000–01, 2002–03
- Diego Forlán – Inter – 2011–12
- Enzo Francescoli – Cagliari, Torino – 1990–94
- José María Franco – Torino – 2001–03
- Ricardo Alberto Frione – Inter – 1932–33

== G ==
- José García – Bologna, Atalanta – 1949–56
- Pablo García – Milan, Venezia – 2000–02
- Walter Gargano – Napoli, Inter, Parma – 2007–15
- Guillermo Giacomazzi – Lecce, Palermo, Empoli – 2001–02, 2003–09, 2010–12
- Henry Giménez – Bologna – 2009–13
- Diego Godín – Inter, Cagliari – 2019–22
- Mauro Goicoechea – Roma – 2012–13
- Walter Gómez – Palermo – 1956–57
- Alejandro González – Verona, Cagliari – 2013–15
- Álvaro González – Lazio, Torino – 2010–15
- Pablo Granoche – Chievo, Novara – 2009–12
- Carlos Grossmüller – Lecce – 2010–12
- Homero Guaglianone – Lazio – 1960–61
- Gianni Guigou – Roma, Siena, Fiorentina, Treviso – 2000–06
- Nelson Gutiérrez – Lazio, Verona – 1988–90

== H ==
- Abel Hernández – Palermo – 2008–13
- José Herrera – Cagliari, Atalanta – 1990–97

== I ==
- Oliviero Icardi – Palermo, Bari – 1935–36, 1937–38
- Salvador Ichazo – Torino – 2014–16, 2018–19
- **Franco Israel** – **Torino** – 2025–

== L ==
- Luis La Paz – Napoli – 1947–48
- Diego Laxalt – Bologna, Empoli, Genoa, Milan, Torino – 2013–20
- Mauricio Lemos – Sassuolo – 2017–19
- Roberto Leopardi – Genoa, Vicenza – 1957–60
- Norberto Liguera – Bologna – 1937–38
- Diego López – Cagliari – 1998–2000, 2004–10
- Nicolás López – Roma, Udinese, Verona – 2012–15
- Ignacio Lores – Palermo – 2011–12

== M ==
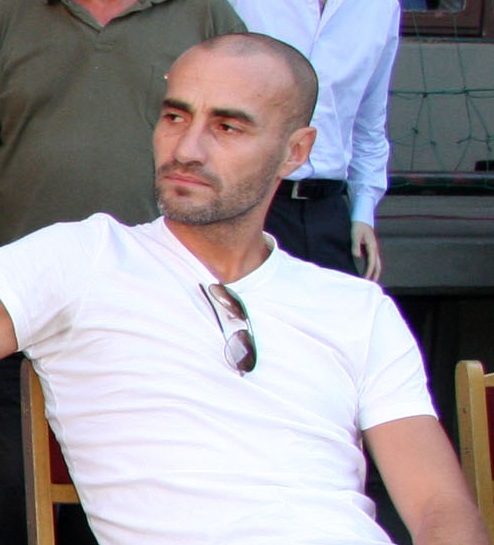
Paolo Montero, one of the best defenders of his time and a very tough player with a huge personality.

- Federico Magallanes – Atalanta, Venezia, Torino – 1996–98, 2001–03
- Andrés Martínez – Lecce, Bologna – 1997–98
- Jorge Martínez – Catania, Juventus, Cesena – 2007–12
- Matías Masiero – Genoa – 2007–08
- Alan Matturro – Genoa – 2023–25
- Leonardo Melazzi – Genoa – 2012–13
- Gustavo Méndez – Vicenza, Torino – 1995–2000
- Leonardo Migliónico – Sampdoria, Livorno, Lecce – 2007–08, 2009–10, 2011–12
- Paolo Montero – Atalanta, Juventus – 1992–94, 1995–2005
- Romualdo Moro – Napoli – 1956–57
- Fernando Muslera – Lazio – 2007–11

== N ==
- Nahitan Nández – Cagliari – 2019–22, 2023–24

== O ==
- Fabián O'Neill – Cagliari, Juventus, Perugia – 1995–97, 1998–2002
- Francisco Occhiuzzi – Bologna – 1932–34
- Christian Oliva – Cagliari – 2019–21
- **Mathías Olivera** – **Napoli** – 2022–
- Rubén Olivera – Juventus, Sampdoria, Genoa, Lecce, Fiorentina – 2002–03, 2004–05, 2006–09, 2010–14
- Maximiliano Olivera – Fiorentina – 2016–18, 2019–21
- Marcelo Otero – Vicenza – 1995–99

== P ==
- Antonio Pacheco – Inter – 2000–01
- Rubén Paz – Genoa – 1989–90
- Luis Alberto Pedemonte – Inter – 1946–47
- Horacio Peralta – Cagliari – 2004–05
- José Perdomo – Genoa – 1989–90
- Álvaro Pereira – Inter – 2012–14
- Rubén Pereira – Cremonese – 1991–92
- Gastón Pereiro – Cagliari, Genoa – 2019–22, 2024–25
- Diego Pérez – Bologna – 2010–14
- Pedro Petrone – Fiorentina – 1931–33
- Diego Polenta – Genoa – 2010–11
- Hugo Esteban Porta – Bologna – 1939–40
- Richard Porta – Siena – 2007–08

== R ==
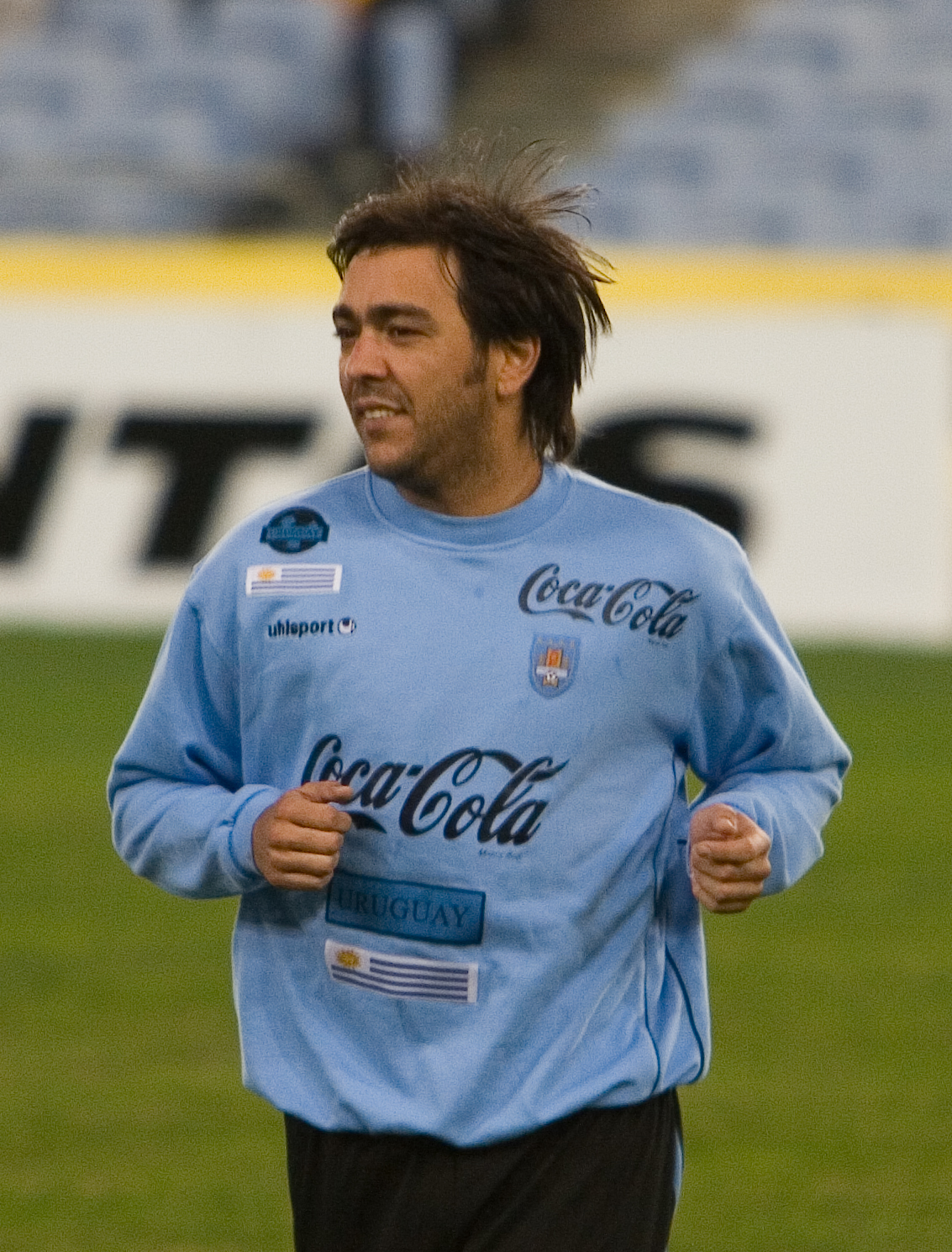
Álvaro Recoba

- Gastón Ramírez – Bologna, Sampdoria – 2010–12, 2017–21
- Juan Manuel Ramos – Spezia – 2020–21
- Álvaro Recoba – Inter, Venezia, Torino – 1997–2008
- Nicolas Riccardi – Palermo – 1935–36, 1937–39
- Egidio Arévalo Ríos – Palermo – 2012–13
- Martín Rivas – Inter, Perugia – 1997–99
- Cristian Rodríguez – Parma – 2014–15
- Diego Rodríguez (Diego Martín Rodríguez) – Udinese – 2012–13
- Diego Rodríguez (Diego Rodríguez Da Luz) – Bologna – 2008–09
- Federico Rodríguez – Bologna – 2013–14
- Guillermo Rodríguez – Cesena, Torino, Verona – 2011–15
- **Juan Rodríguez** – **Cagliari** – 2025–
- Ribair Rodríguez – Siena – 2012–13
- Alexis Rolín – Catania – 2012–14
- Marcel Román – Genoa – 2008–09
- Luis Romero – Cagliari – 1996–97

== S ==
- Marcelo Saralegui – Torino – 1992–93
- Vicente Sarni – Fiorentina – 1932–33
- Martín Satriano – Inter, Empoli – 2021–23
- Héctor Scarone – Inter, Palermo – 1931–35
- Nicolás Schiappacasse – Parma, Sassuolo – 2018–19, 2020–21
- Carlos Servetti – Genoa – 1937–39
- Darío Silva – Cagliari – 1995–97
- Gastón Silva – Torino – 2014–16
- Santiago Silva – Fiorentina – 2011–12
- Gonzalo Sorondo – Inter – 2001–02
- Joaquín Sosa – Bologna – 2022–23
- Rubén Sosa – Lazio, Inter – 1988–95
- Cristhian Stuani – Reggina – 2007–09

== T ==
- Marcelo Tejera – Cagliari – 1992–93
- Lucas Torreira – Sampdoria, Fiorentina – 2016–18, 2021–22

== V ==
- Carlos Valdez – Treviso, Reggina – 2005–06, 2007–09
- Matías Vecino – Fiorentina, Cagliari, Empoli, Inter, Lazio – 2013–26
- Waldemar Victorino – Cagliari – 1982–83
- Ernesto Vidal – Fiorentina, Pro Patria – 1953–56
- Matías Viña – Roma, Sassuolo – 2021–24
- Tabaré Viudez – Milan – 2008–09
- Tomaso Luis Volpi – Inter – 1946–47

== Z ==
- Marcelo Zalayeta – Juventus, Empoli, Perugia, Napoli, Bologna – 1997–99, 2001–06, 2007–10
- Bibiano Zapirain – Inter – 1946–48

== See also ==
- List of foreign Serie A players
- List of Uruguayan footballers in Serie B
- Oriundo
- Serie A Foreign Footballer of the Year

== Notes ==
1. Born in Argentina
2. Born in Australia
3. Born in Brazil
4. Born in Croatia (then part of the Kingdom of Italy)
5. Capped for the Australia national under-17 football team
