= List of Uruguayan footballers in Serie B =

The list of Uruguayan footballers in Serie B records the association football players from Uruguay who have appeared at least once for a team in the Italian Serie B. Entries in bold denote players still active in actual season.

== A ==
- Nelson Abeijón – Cagliari, Como – 2000–04
- Mathías Abero – Avellino, Bologna – 2013–15
- Rodrigo Aguirre – Perugia – 2015–16
- Nicolás Albarracín – Spezia – 2012–14
- Juan Alberti – Palermo – 1936–39
- Matías Alonso – Bari – 2013–14
- Agustín Álvarez – Sampdoria, Monza – 2023–24, 2025–26
- Nicolás Amodio – Napoli, Treviso, Mantova, Piacenza, Portogruaro – 2006–08, 2009–11
- Gustavo Aprile – Bari – 2012–13
- Maximiliano Arias – Brescia – 2012–13
- Felipe Avenatti – Ternana – 2013–17

== B ==
- Jaime Báez – Livorno, Spezia, Pescara, Cosenza, Cremonese, Frosinone – 2015–23
- Raúl Banfi – Modena, Mantova, Prato – 1940–41, 1942–43, 1945–47
- Daniel Baldi – Treviso – 2006–07
- Santiago Bellini – Pescara – 2018–19
- Rubén Bentancourt – Bologna – 2014–15
- Mariano Bogliacino – Napoli, Bari – 2006–07, 2011–12
- Nicolás Suárez Bremec – Arezzo, Ascoli, Grosseto, Vicenza – 2005–08, 2012–13, 2014–15
- **Gaston Brugman** – Empoli, Grosseto, Pescara, Parma, **Modena** – 2010–15, 2017–19, 2021–22, 2025–

== C ==
- Pablo Eduardo Caballero – Reggina – 2013–14
- Washington Cacciavillani – Pro Patria – 1956–57
- Gastón Camaño – Empoli – 2011–12
- Jorge Daniel Casanova – Ravenna – 2000–01
- Angel Cerilla – Napoli – 1948–49
- Juan Ignacio Silva Cerón – Triestina – 2006–07
- Javier Chevantón – Lecce – 2002–03

== D ==
- Juan Delgado – Crotone – 2015–16

== E ==
- Edgar Elizalde – Pescara – 2017–18, 2019–20

== F ==
- César Falletti – Ternana, Palermo, Cremonese, Bari, Mantova – 2013–17, 2018–19, 2021–26
- Maximilián Faotto – Palermo – 1936–37
- Mateo Figoli – Triestina – 2008–10
- Darío Flores – Perugia – 2014–15
- José María Franco – Torino – 2003–05
- Ricardo Alberto Frione – Sanremese – 1938–39

== G ==
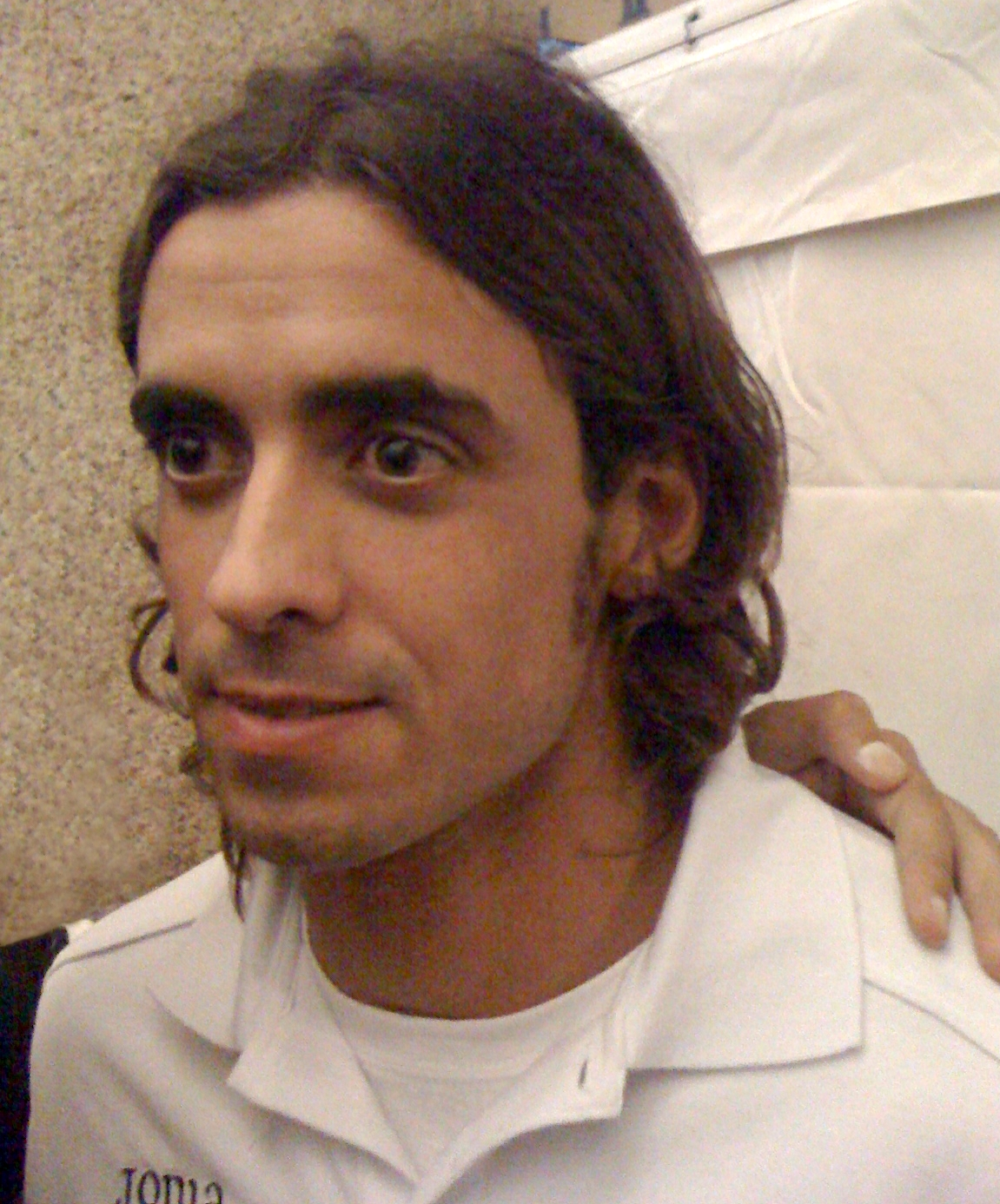
Pablo Granoche is the foreign players with most goals and Uruguayan most capped in Serie B.

- Carlos Andrés García – Venezia – 2004–05
- Guillermo Giacomazzi – Lecce, Siena, Perugia – 2002–03, 2006–07, 2009–10, 2013–15
- Henry Damián Giménez – Perugia – 2012–13
- Walter Gomez – Palermo – 1957–58
- Alejandro González – Ternana, Avellino, Perugia – 2015–18
- Facundo González – Sampdoria – 2023–24
- Pablo Granoche – Triestina, Varese, Padova, Cesena, Modena, Spezia – 2007–09, 2011–18
- Gianni Guigou – Treviso – 2006–09
- Nelson Gutierrez – Verona – 1990–91

== H ==
- Abel Hernández – Palermo – 2013–14

== I ==
- Oliviero Icardi – Palermo, Verona – 1936–37, 1938–40
- Salvador Ichazo – Bari – 2016–17

== L ==
- Luis La Paz – Napoli – 1948–50
- Norberto Liguera – Anconitana, Bologna – 1938–40
- Marcelo Lipatin – Bari – 2003–05
- Ignacio Lores Varela – Palermo, Bari, Vicenza, Pisa, Ascoli, Cittadella – 2013–15, 2016–18, 2021–23
- Diego López – Cagliari – 2000–04
- Walter Alberto Lopez – Brescia, Benevento, Spezia, Salernitana – 2009–10, 2016–21
- Hernán Rodrigo López – Torino – 1998–99

== M ==
- Damián Macaluso – Venezia – 2004–05
- Jorge Andrés Martínez – Novara – 2013–14
- Matías Masiero – Pisa – 2008–09
- Gonzalo Mastriani – Crotone – 2013–14
- Alan Matturro – Genoa – 2022–23
- Gustavo Méndez – Torino – 2000–01
- Leonardo Martin Miglionico – Piacenza, Livorno – 2004–09, 2010–12
- Paolo Montero – Atalanta – 1994–95

== N ==
- Nahitan Nández – Cagliari – 2022–23

== O ==
- Fabián O'Neill – Cagliari – 1997–98
- Agustín Olivera – Modena – 2015–16
- Rubén Olivera – Brescia, Latina – 2013–16
- Renzo Orihuela – Palermo – 2022–23

== P ==
- Pablo Pallante – Gallipoli – 2009–10
- Gastón Pereiro – Cagliari, Ternana, Bari – 2022–26
- Diego Pérez – Bologna – 2014–15
- Diego Perrone – Catania – 2005–06
- Diego Polenta – Bari – 2011–14

== R ==
- Gastón Ramírez – Monza – 2021–22
- Juan Manuel Ramos – Catania, Spezia – 2014–15, 2019–20
- Nicolas Riccardi – Palermo – 1936–37
- Alexis Rolín – Catania – 2014–15
- Marcel Román – Frosinone – 2008–09

== S ==
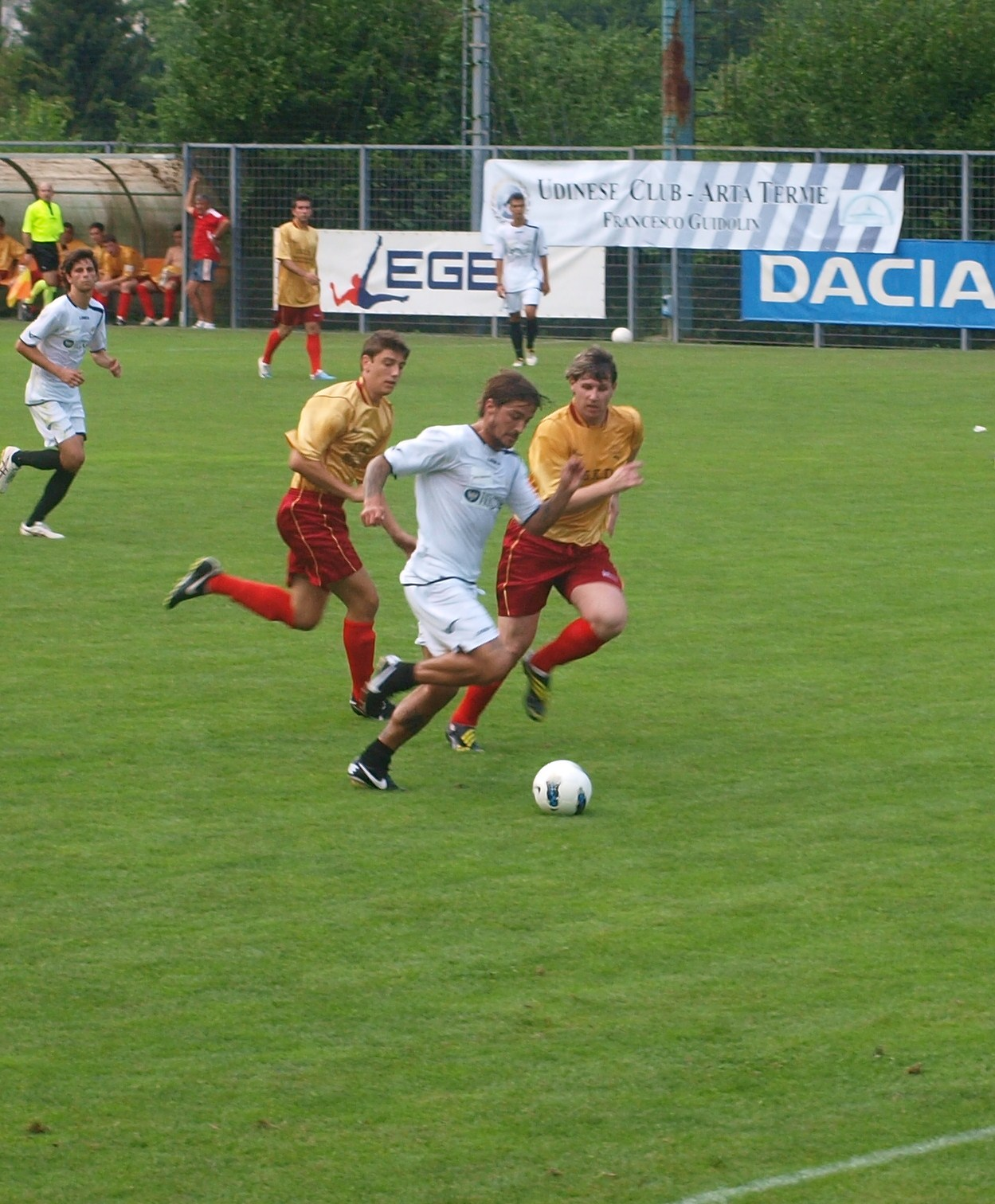
Juan Surraco (in the middle) is the second most capped Uruguayan in Serie B.

- Andrés Schetino – Cosenza – 2018–19
- Darío Silva – Cagliari – 1997–98
- Cristian Sosa – Gallipoli, Cittadella – 2009–10, 2012–14
- Joaquín Sosa – Reggiana – 2024–25
- Juan Surraco – Messina, Ancona, Livorno, Modena, Cittadella, Ternana – 2007–15, 2016–17

== T ==
- Lucas Torreira – Pescara – 2014–16
- Hugo Tortora – Reggiana – 1940–41
- Victor Tortora – Palermo, Venezia – 1936–39, 1945–46

== V ==
- Carlos Adrián Valdez – Treviso, Reggina, Siena – 2006–07, 2009–11
- Agustín Viana – Gallipoli – 2009–10
- Gonzalo Germán Vicente – Venezia – 2004–05

== Z ==
- Marcelo Zalayeta – Juventus – 2006–07

== See also ==
- List of foreign Serie B players
- List of Uruguayan footballers in Serie A

== Notes ==
1. Born in Spain
2. Born in the USA
