= 2017–18 Primera División de El Salvador =

Primera División de Fútbol Profesional de El Salvador
- Season: 2017–18
- Champions: Alianza (Apertura); Alianza (Clausura)
- Relegated: Dragón
- Champions League: Alianza
- CONCACAF League: Santa Tecla; FAS
- Matches: 35
- Goals: 86 (2.46 per match)
- Biggest home win: Isidro Metapán 3-0 Pasaquina (29 July 2017); Limeño 3-0 Dragón (20 August 2017); FAS 3-0 Limeño (31 August 2017)
- Biggest away win: Firpo 2–5 Alianza (27 August 2017)
- Highest scoring: Alianza 5–3 Isidro Metapán (20 August 2017)
- All statistics correct as of 20 August 2017.

The 2017–18 Primera División de El Salvador (also known as the Liga Pepsi) was the 19th season and 37th and 38th tournament of El Salvador's Primera División since its establishment of an Apertura and Clausura format. Santa Tecla were the defending champions of the Apertura and Clausura. The league consisted of 12 teams. Two seasons were conducted under identical rules, with each team playing a home and away game against every other club for a total of 22 games per club in the tournament. At the end of each half-season tournament, the top eight teams in that tournament's regular season standings would take part in the playoffs.

The champions of Apertura or Clausura with the better aggregate record will qualify for the 2019 CONCACAF Champions League. The other champion, and the runner-up with the better aggregate record will qualify for the 2018 CONCACAF League. Should the same team win both tournaments, both runners-up will qualify for CONCACAF League. Should the final of both tournaments features the same two teams, the semifinalist with the better aggregate record will qualify for CONCACAF League.

== Teams ==
A total of 12 teams will contest the league, including 11 sides from the 2016–17 Primera División and 1 promoted from the 2016–17 Segunda División.

UES were relegated to 2017–18 Segunda División the previous season.

The relegated team was replaced by the 2016–17 Segunda División playoffs promotion winner. Independiente won the Apertura 2016, while Audaz won the Clausura 2017 title. C.D. Audaz won the playoffs by the score of 1-0.

C.D. Chalatenango were stripped of their license after suffering financial trouble (failing to primera division license, their players and staff).

A.D. Chalatenango were formed by business leaders and by the local government, they purchased the license and debts of CD Chalatenango .

=== Promotion and relegation ===
Promoted from Segunda División de Fútbol Salvadoreño as of June, 2017.

- Champions: C.D. Audaz

Relegated to Segunda División de Fútbol Salvadoreño as of June, 2017.

- Last Place: UES

=== Personnel and sponsoring ===
Team	Chairman	Head Coach	Captain	Kitmaker	Shirt sponsor
Águila	(El Salvador) Pedro Arieta	(Uruguay) Jorge Daniel Casanova	(El Salvador) Deris Umanzor	Joma	Tigo, Canal 4, Pollo Campesto
Alianza	(El Salvador) Adolfo Salume	(El Salvador) Jorge Rodríguez	(El Salvador) Rodolfo Zelaya	Lotto	Canal 4, Mister Donut, Tigo, Gatorade, Veca Airlines, Brahva
Audaz	(El Salvador) Juan Pablo Herrera	(Honduras) German Pérez	(El Salvador) Levi Martinez	Maca	Canal 4, Vitasym, Acodjar de R.L.
Chalatenango	(El Salvador) Rigoberto Mejia	(El Salvador) Ricardo Serrano	(El Salvador) Héctor Cruz	Nil	Canal 4, Eurofarm, Grupo de MC
Dragón	(El Salvador) Abelio Diaz	(Colombia) Henry Vanegas	(El Salvador) Manuel González	Rush Atletic Wear	Canal 4, GRS, Lemus
FAS	(El Salvador) Guillermo Morán	(El Salvador) Cristian Álvarez	(El Salvador) Néstor Raúl Renderos	Milán	Pilsener, Tigo, Canal 4
Firpo	(El Salvador) Modesto Torres	(El Salvador) Ramón Sánchez	(Colombia) Jhonny Ríos	Kelme	Dial Fm, Pilsener, Tienors Galo, Lemus
Isidro Metapán	(El Salvador) Rafael Morataya	(El Salvador) Edwin Portillo	(El Salvador) Milton Molina	Milan	Canal 4
Limeño	(El Salvador) Martín Herrera	(Paraguay) Hugo Ovelar	(El Salvador) Francisco Jovel Álvarez	Nil	UNAB (Universidad Dr. Andres Berello), Chilos Seafood Restaurant, TuriTravel, Disturbidora Torres
Pasaquina	(El Salvador) Óscar Ramírez	(El Salvador) Omar Sevilla	(El Salvador) Carlos Arévalo	Nil	Canal 4, Innova sport
Sonsonate	(El Salvador) Pedro Contreras	(Uruguay) Garabet Avedissian	(El Salvador) Carlos Carrillo	Rush Atletic wear	ProACES, Aldasa, Alcadia Municipal Sonsonate, Canal 4, Leche salud, Ferreteria Santa Sofia, Coop-1
Santa Tecla	(El Salvador) José Vidal Hernández	(Argentina) Ernesto Corti	(El Salvador) Diego Chavarria	Kelme	Powerade, DLC, Canal 21, Pilsener,Claro, Plaza Merliot, Pollo Indio, Petrox, Dizucar, Bolívar, Toledo, The Moustache

== Notable events ==
=== Point deduction ===
Pasaquina was docked 6 points for failing to pay over players' wages. However, this was later changed to a fine and Pasaquina were able to keep their points.

=== Sale of Luis Angel Firpo ===
In August 2017, Familia Galo, owners of Luis Angel Firpo, announced that they were putting the team up for sale. The Modesto Torres group was one of three known groups to have submitted a preliminary bid for the club. The other two groups were Julio Sosa group, former president of Aguila, and an unnamed Mexican group. The sale was completed on September 16, to the Modesto Torres group for an unknown amount.

=== Change of Ownership of Aguila ===
After weeks of protest from fans and criticism from players and the media for Aguila late payment for players, poor recruitment and lack of success. The Arieta group announced on 30 December 2017 that they were selling their operating rights for Aguila and would announce the names of the new owners in the new year.

=== Primera division boycott ===
In October 2017, eleven clubs voted to boycott FESFUT and leave the primera division (Aguila were the only team to vote against leaving), causing round 12 to be suspended. A few days later Limeno, Pasaquina, Audaz and Chalatenango voted to return to the Primera division. Following negotiations held by The El Salvador government between FESFUT and the other Primera division clubs, they returned to the primera division. As a protest of the decision to return to the primera division, Lisandrohl Pohl and Vidal Hernandez resigned as president and vice president

=== Sale of Luis Angel Firpo for the second time ===
Owing to financial problem and complaints from fan bases, the Modesto Torres group put Luis Angel Firpo up for sale, the second time for the year.

=== Notable death from Apertura 2017 season and 2018 Clausura season ===
The following people associated with the Primera Division have died in end of 2017 and mid 2018.

- Elmer Acevedo
- Raúl Antonio García
- Juan Ramón Pacheco
- Carlos Eduardo Pineda
- Fabio de Azevdo
- Lino Medina
- Axel Hochkoeppler

== Managerial changes ==
=== Before the start of the season ===
Team	Outgoing manager	Manner of departure	Date of vacancy	Replaced by	Date of appointment	Position in table
Sonsonate	(Brazil) Eraldo Correia	Sacked	May 2017	(Uruguay) Garabet Avedissian	May 2017	th (Clausura 2017)
FAS	(El Salvador) Emiliano Pedrozo	Moved to become assistant coach	May 2017	(El Salvador) Cristian Álvarez	May 2017	th (Clausura 2017)
Metapan	(El Salvador) Alvaro Misael Alfaro	Moved to become assistant coach	May 2017	(El Salvador) Edwin Portillo	May 2017	th (Clausura 2017)
Chalatenango	(El Salvador) N/A	New team formed	2017	(El Salvador) Ricardo Serrano	May 2017	N/A

=== During the Apertura season ===
Team	Outgoing manager	Manner of departure	Date of vacancy	Replaced by	Date of appointment	Position in table
Águila	(Uruguay) Jorge Daniel Casanova	Sacked	August 2017	(Argentina) Osvaldo Escudero	August 2017	10th (Apertura 2017)
Sonsonate	(Uruguay) Garabet Avedissian	Resigned	August 2017	(Uruguay) Ruben Alonso	August 2017	10th (Apertura 2017)
Dragon	(Colombia) Henry Vanegas	Sacked	September 2017	(El Salvador) Efrain Burgos	September 2017	11th (Apertura 2017)
Pasaquina	(El Salvador) Omar Sevilla	Resigned	September 2017	(El Salvador) Manuel Carranza Murillo	October 2017	th (Apertura 2017)
Chalatenango	(El Salvador) Ricardo Serrano	Sacked	September 2017	(El Salvador) William Renderos Iraheta	September 2017	th (Apertura 2017)
Firpo	(El Salvador) Juan Ramón Sánchez	Sacked	October 2017	(Brazil) Eraldo Correia	October 2017	th (Apertura 2017)
Dragon	(El Salvador) Efrain Burgos	Sacked	November 2017	(El Salvador) Abel Blanco	November 2017	12th (Apertura 2017)

=== Between Apertura and Clausura seasons ===
Team	Outgoing manager	Manner of departure	Date of vacancy	Replaced by	Date of appointment	Position in table
C.D. Dragon	(El Salvador) Abel Blanco/ Santos Rivera	Moved back to Assistant coach	November 2017	(Colombia) Diego Pizarro	November 2017	12th (Apertura 2017)
Audaz	(Honduras) German Pérez	Sacked	November 2017	(El Salvador) Misael Alfaro	December 2017	Th (Apertura 2017)
Limeno	(Paraguay) Hugo Ovelar	Contract finished	December 2017	(Argentina) Emiliano Barrera	December 2017	Th (Apertura 2017)
Santa Tecla	(Argentina) Ernesto Corti	Contract finished	December 2017	(Uruguay) Rubén da Silva	December 2017	Th (Apertura 2017)

=== During the Clausura season ===
Team	Outgoing manager	Manner of departure	Date of vacancy	Replaced by	Date of appointment	Position in table
Pasaquina	(El Salvador) Manuel Carranza Murillo	Sacked	February 2018	(El Salvador) Francisco Robles 'Interim'	February 2018	10th (Clausura 2018)
C.D. Audaz	(El Salvador) Alvaro Misael Alfaro	Resigned	February 2018	(El Salvador) Rafael Tobar and Emerson Umaña (Interim)	2018	12th (Clausura 2018)
C.D. Aguila	(Argentina) Osvaldo Escudero	Sacked	February 2018	(El Salvador) Marvin Benitez (Interim)	2018	4th (Clausura 2018)
C.D. Sonsonate	(Uruguay) Ruben Alonso	Resigned	February 2018	(El Salvador) Juan Ramon Sanchez	2018	12th (Clausura 2018)
C.D. Luis Angel Firpo	(Brazil) Eraldo Correia	Sacked	February 2018	(El Salvador) Victor Giron and Francisco Jovel (Interim)	2018	12th (Clausura 2018)
C.D. Chalatenango	(El Salvador) William Renderos Iraheta	Sacked	February 2018	(El Salvador) Geovany Portillo (Interim)	2018	12th (Clausura 2018)
C.D. Audaz	Rafael Tobar and Emerson Umaña (Interim)	Moved to become assistant coaches	February 2018	(El Salvador) Carlos Romero	March 2018	12th (Clausura 2018)
C.D. Aguila	(El Salvador) Marvin Benitez (Interim)	Interim finished, moved to be assistant	March 2018	(El Salvador) Miguel Aguilar Obando	March 2018	4th (Clausura 2018)
A.D. Isidro Metapan	(El Salvador) Edwin Portillo	Resigned	March 2018	(Peru) Agustin Castillo	March 2018	10th (Clausura 2018)
C.D. Luis Angel Firpo	(El Salvador) Victor Giron and Francisco Jovel (Interim)	Interimship finished	March 2018	(El Salvador) Giovanni Trigueros	March 2018	th (Clausura 2018)
C.D. Municipal Limeno	(Argentina) Emiliano Barrera	Sacked	March 2018	(El Salvador) Wilfredo Molina Interim	March 2018	th (Clausura 2018)
C.D. Municipal Limeno	(El Salvador) Wilfredo Molina Interim	Back to assistant coach	March 2018	(El Salvador) Víctor Coreas	March 2018	th (Clausura 2018)
C.D. Dragon	(Colombia) Diego Pizarro	Sacked	April 2018	(El Salvador) Santos Rivera Interim	April 2018	th (Clausura 2018)

== Apertura ==
=== League table ===
Pos	Team	Pld	W	D	L	GF	GA	GD	Pts	Qualification or relegation
1	Alianza	22	14	8	0	50	19	+31	50	Quarterfinals
2	Santa Tecla	22	10	9	3	41	23	+18	39	Quarterfinals
3	Isidro Metapán	22	11	4	7	36	30	+6	37	Quarterfinals
4	FAS	22	8	10	4	30	21	+9	34	Quarterfinals
5	Águila	22	6	9	7	32	38	−6	27	Quarterfinals
6	Chalatenango	22	6	8	8	21	23	−2	26	Quarterfinals
7	Municipal Limeño	22	7	5	10	24	30	−6	26	Quarterfinals
8	Pasaquina (Note: Pasaquina was docked 6 points for failing to pay over players' wages. However later changed to a fine and Pasaquina were able to keep their points)	22	5	10	7	29	36	−7	25	Quarterfinals
9	C.D. Audaz	22	6	5	11	28	40	−12	23	
10	Dragón	22	5	7	10	23	35	−12	22	
11	Sonsonate	22	3	10	9	27	34	−7	19	
12	Firpo	22	2	13	7	24	36	−12	19	

Updated to match(es) played on 15 November 2017. Source:
Rules for classification: 1) points; 2) goal difference; 3) number of goals scored.

=== Results ===
Home \ Away	ÁGU	ALI	AUD	CHA	DRA	FAS	FIR	MET	LIM	PAS	STE	SON
Águila		1–3	1–0	4–3	1–0	1–1	1–1	2–3	2–1	2–2	1–0	1–1
Alianza	5–0		4–1	0–0	1–0	1–1	0–0	5–3	4–0	5–2	1–1	2–1
Audaz	2–2	2–3		1–2	1–0	1–0	0–0	4–3	0–2	2–2	2–1	3–2
Chalatenango	3–2	0–2	0–0		4–2	0–1	2–1	1–0	0–1	0–0	0–0	1–1
Dragón	4–3	0–2	1–2	2–0		3–2	0–0	0–0	1–1	2–1	0–2	2–2
C.D. FAS	1–1	1–1	2–1	1–1	1–1		2–3	2–0	3–0	1–1	1–2	0–0
Firpo	1–1	2–5	1–1	0–2	3–0	0–1		2–2	0–2	0–0	2–2	1–1
Isidro Metapán	1–0	1–2	2–0	1–0	1–1	1–1	4–2		2–1	3–0	1–0	3–1
Limeño	1–3	0–1	4–0	0–0	3–0	0–3	1–1	1–3		2–0	0–0	3–0
Pasaquina	2–2	2–2	2–1	2–1	1–2	0–1	0–0	2–0	1–1		3–3	4–3
Santa Tecla	3–1	1–1	3–2	2–1	2–2	2–2	5–0	2–0	4–0	3–1		2–1
Sonsonate	0–0	0–0	3–2	0–0	2–0	1–2	4–4	1–2	2–0	0–1	1–1	

Legend: Blue = home team win; Yellow = draw; Red = away team win.

==== Scoring ====
- First goal of the season: (Paraguay) Lorenzo Frutos for Santa Tecla F.C. against C.D. FAS, 33 minutes (July 29, 2017)
- First goal by a foreign player: Lorenzo Frutos for Santa Tecla F.C. against C.D. FAS, 33 minutes (July 29, 2017)
- Fastest goal in a match: 6 minutes
  - (Jamaica) Mckauly Tulloch for A.D. Isidro Metapan against C.D. Pasaquina (July, 2017)
- Goal scored at the latest point in a match: 90+2 minutes
  - (Paraguay) Javier Lezcano own goal for A.D. Chalatenango against C.D. Aguila (August, 2017)
- First penalty Kick of the season: (El Salvador) Herbert Sosa for Alianza F.C. against C.D. Dragon, minutes (July 30, 2017)
- Widest winning margin: 3 goals
  - A.D. Isidro Metapan 3–0 C.D. Pasaquina (July 29, 2017)
- First hat-trick of the season: (Jamaica) (Paraguay) Gustavo Guerreño for Alianza F.C. against Firpo (August 27, 2017)
- First own goal of the season: (Paraguay) Javier Lezcano (C.D. Aguila) for Chalatenango (August, 2017)
- Most goals in a match: 8 goals
  - Alianza 5–3 A.D. Isidro Metapan (August, 2017)
- Most goals by one team in a match: 3 goals
  - A.D. Isidro Metapan 3–0 C.D. Pasaquina (July 29, 2017)
    A.D. Isidro Metapan 3-5 Alianza F.C. (August 2017)
- Most goals in one half by one team: 4 goals
  - TBD 5–2(1–2) TBD (2nd half, September 30, 2016)
- Most goals scored by losing team: 3 goals
  - A.D. Isidro Metapan 3–5 Alianza F.C. (August, 2017)
- Most goals by one player in a single match: 3 goals
  - (Paraguay) Gustavo Guerreño for Alianza F.C. against Firpo (August 27, 2017)
  - (Paraguay) Gustavo Guerreño for Limeno against Firpo (September, 2017)
  - (Panama) Armando Polo for Sonsonate against Firpo (October, 2017)
  - (Paraguay) Gustavo Guerreño for Alianza F.C. against Aguila (November, 2017)

=== Top goalscorers ===
Source :

Rank	Player	Team	Goals
1	(Paraguay) Gustavo Guerreño	Alianza	12
1	(Panama) Armando Polo	Sonsonate	12
3	(Paraguay) Lorenzo Frutos	Santa Tecla	9
3	(El Salvador) José Gutierréz	Pasaquina	9
5	(Colombia) James Cabezas	Águila	8
5	(Colombia) Daley Mena	Audaz	8
5	(El Salvador) Christian Sánchez	Isidro Metapán	8
8	(Panama) Nicolás Muñoz	Firpo	7
8	(Jamaica) Jimmy Tulloch	Isidro Metapán	7
10	(El Salvador) Gilberto Baires	Santa Tecla	6
10	(Brazil) Zé Paulo	Sonsonate	6
10	(Colombia) Luis Hinestroza	Alianza	6
10	(Paraguay) Javier Lezcano	Águila	6
10	(Colombia) Luis Palacios	Pasaquina	6

=== Individual awards ===
Hombre GOL	Best Coach Award	Best Goalkeeper Award	Fair Player Award	Rookie Player Award
(Paraguay) Gustavo Guerreño; Alianza	(El Salvador) TBD; Sonsonate	(Argentina) Matías Coloca; FAS	(El Salvador) TBD; Alianza	(El Salvador) TBD; FAS

=== Playoffs ===
Quarterfinals
6	Chalatenango	0	3	3
3	Isidro Metapán (s)	1	2	3
7	Limeno	0	0	0
2	Santa Tecla (s)	0	0	0
5	Águila	0	1	1
4	FAS (s)	0	1	1
8	Pasaquina	0	0	0
1	Alianza F.C.	0	4	4

Semifinals
Isidro Metapán	1	1	2
Santa Tecla (s)	0	2	2
FAS	1	1	2
Alianza F.C. (s)	1	1	2

Finals
Santa Tecla	1
Alianza F.C.	4

==== Quarterfinals ====
Team 1	Agg.	Team 2	1st leg	2nd leg
Metapan	3–3 (s)	Chalatenango	0–1	2–3
FAS	1–1 (s)	C.D. Aguila	1–1	2–0
Santa Tecla	0–0 (s)	Limeno	0–0	0–0
Alianza	4–0	Pasaquina	0–0	4–0

1. ^{†} Order of legs reversed.

===== First leg =====
November 30, 2017
15:00 UTC−6

Chalatenango	0–1	Isidro Metapan
		Mckauly Tulloch 82'

Estadio José Gregorio Martínez,
Chalatenango, El Salvador
Referee: Elmer Martínez

November 30, 2017
19:00 UTC−6

Aguila	0-0	FAS

Juan Francisco Barraza,
San Miguel, El Salvador
Referee: Joel Aguilar Chicas

December 1, 2017
15:00 UTC−6

Pasaquina	0-0	Alianza

Estadio Cuscatlan
San Salvador

December 1, 2017
19:00 UTC−6

Limeno	0-0	Santa Tecla

Estadio Jose Ramon Flores, Santa Rosa de Lima

===== Second leg =====
December 2, 2017
15:00 UTC−6

Isidro Metapan	2-3	Chalatenango
Paolo Suarez 3'; Mckauly Tulloch 43'		Carlos Angulo 68'; Bladimir Diaz 86' 87'

Estadio Jorge Calero Suárez, Metapán

3-3. Isidro Metapan advanced as the higher seeded team.

December 3, 2016
19:00 UTC−6

FAS	1-1	Aguila
William Maldonaldo 13'		Victor Garcia 50'

Estadio Óscar Quiteño, Santa Ana

1-1. FAS advanced as the higher seeded team.

December 3, 2017
15:00 UTC−6

Alianza	4-0	Pasaquina
Marvin Monterrosa 31'; Herbert Sosa 41'; Rodolfo Zelaya 73'; Gustavo Guerreno 79'		'

Estadio Cuscatlan
San Salvador

Alianza won 4-0 on aggregate.

December 1, 2017
19:00 UTC−6

Santa Tecla	0–0	Limeno

Estadio Las Delicias, Santa Tecla, El Salvador

0-0. Santa Tecla advanced as the higher seeded team.

==== Semifinals ====
Team 1	Agg.	Team 2	1st leg	2nd leg
Metapan	2-2 (s)	Santa Tecla	1-0	2-1
FAS	2-2 (s)	Alianza	1-1	1-1

===== First leg =====
December 7, 2017
19:00 UTC−6

Metapan	1-0	Santa Tecla
José Ángel Peña 29'

Estadio Jorge "Calero" Suáre
Referee: Iván Barton

December 7, 2017
19:30 UTC−6

FAS	1-1	Alianza
Teobaldo Torres 59'		Henry Romero 44'

Estadio Óscar Quiteño
Attendance: 8802

===== Second leg =====
December 10, 2017
18:00 UTC−6

Santa Tecla	2-1	Metapan
Lorenzo Frutos 59'; Kevin Reyes 59'		Mckauly Tulloch 59'

Estadio Las Delicias, Santa Tecla

2-2. Santa Tecla advanced as the higher seeded team.

December 10, 2017
19:30 UTC−6

Alianza	1-1	FAS
Rodolfo Zelaya 72'		Xavi García 19'

2-2. Alianza advanced as the higher seeded team.

==== Final ====
December 18, 2017
15:00 UTC−6

Alianza	4-1	Santa Tecla
Marvin Monterrosa 12'; Rodolfo Zelaya 16' 65'; Gustavo Guerreno 29'		Ricardinho 44'

Estadio Cuscatlán, San Salvador
Attendance: 23,965
Referee: Joel Antonio Aguilar Chicas

Alianza F.C.
GK	1	(Uruguay) Víctor García
DF	3	(El Salvador) Ivan Mancía	(yellow card) 40'
DF	20	(Uruguay) Darío Ferreira
DF	15	(El Salvador) Jonathan Jiménez
DF	28	(El Salvador) Rudy Clavel	(yellow card) 5'	(substituted off) 59'
MF	6	(El Salvador) Narciso Orellana
MF	27	(El Salvador) Issac Portillo	(yellow card) 83'
MF	21	(El Salvador) Marvin Monterrosa		(substituted off) 73'
MF	17	(El Salvador) Alexander Larín		(substituted off) 51'
MF	18	(Paraguay) Gustavo Guerreño	(yellow card) 95'
FW	22	(El Salvador) Rodolfo Zelaya	(yellow card) 79'
Substitutes:
FW	9	(El Salvador) Óscar Cerén		(substituted on) 51'
FW	10	(El Salvador) Rubén Marroquín		(substituted on) 59'
FW	10	(El Salvador) Juan Carlos Portillo		(substituted on) 73'
Manager:
(El Salvador) Jorge Humberto Rodriguez

Santa Tecla F.C.
GK	1	(Mexico) Joel Almeida
DF	6	(El Salvador) Bryan Tamacas
DF	5	(El Salvador) Alexander Mendoza	(yellow card) 84'
DF	4	(El Salvador) Juan Barahona
DF	17	(El Salvador) Kevin Ayala		(substituted off) 38'
MF	15	(El Salvador) Diego Chavarría
MF	22	(Brazil) Ricardinho	(yellow card) 76'
MF	23	(Brazil) Wanderson Silvera		(substituted off) 25'
MF	31	(El Salvador) Kevin Reyes	(yellow card) 5'
FW	19	(El Salvador) William Canales		(substituted off) 50'
FW	8	(Paraguay) Lorenzo Frutos
Substitutes:
FW	7	(El Salvador) Harold Alas		(substituted on) 25'
MF	25	(El Salvador) Jacobo Moreno		(substituted on) 38'
MF	11	(El Salvador) Gilberto Baires		(substituted on) 50'
Manager:
(Argentina) Ernesto Corti

Apertura 2017 champions

12th title

== Clausura ==
=== League table ===
Pos	Team	Pld	W	D	L	GF	GA	GD	Pts	Qualification or relegation
1	Alianza	22	16	3	3	37	15	+22	51	Quarterfinals
2	Santa Tecla	22	14	5	3	40	12	+28	47	Quarterfinals
3	FAS	22	14	3	5	39	23	+16	45	Quarterfinals
4	Águila	22	9	6	7	23	21	+2	33	Quarterfinals
5	Firpo	22	7	6	9	26	29	−3	27	Quarterfinals
6	C.D. Audaz	22	7	5	10	25	39	−14	26	Quarterfinals
7	Municipal Limeño	22	6	6	10	31	31	0	24	Quarterfinals
8	Sonsonate (Note: Sonsonate finished in eighth place, however due to having to play a relegation game to stay in the primera division, they were forced to forfeit their finals spot to Pasaquina, Later were given the right to play in the quarter final)	22	6	6	10	23	32	−9	24	Quarterfinals
9	Pasaquina	22	6	6	10	20	30	−10	24	
10	Chalatenango	22	6	4	12	21	29	−8	22	
11	Dragón	22	4	9	9	16	25	−9	21	
12	Isidro Metapán	22	4	7	11	26	41	−15	19	

Updated to match(es) played on 15 November 2017. Source:
Rules for classification: 1) points; 2) goal difference; 3) number of goals scored.

=== Results ===
Home \ Away	ÁGU	ALI	AUD	CHA	DRA	FAS	FIR	MET	LIM	PAS	STE	SON
Águila		0–2	1–1	1–1	0–0	1–0	3–0	2–0	1–0	1–2	0–0	1–1
Alianza	3–0		2–0	4–1	2–1	1–2	2–1	2–1	2–1	0–0	2–1	2–0
Audaz	3–1	2–1		0–0	1–1	2–3	2–1	2–0	2–2	2–1	0–3	1–2
Chalatenango	0–1	1–1	3–0		0–1	1–2	1–0	2–3	0–2	1–3	1–0	2–1
Dragón	0–2	0–0	1–2	1–1		0–1	1–2	1–2	0–0	1–0	0–3	3–0
C.D. FAS	0–1	1–2	4–1	2–0	2–0		4–2	2–1	2–1	1–0	1–1	4–1
Firpo	1–2	1–2	1–0	0–1	1–1	1–0		4–1	2–2	1–1	3–2	1–0
Isidro Metapán	2–2	0–1	1–2	2–1	0–0	1–1	1–1		3–2	2–2	0–3	1–1
Limeño	2–0	1–2	2–0	3–2	1–1	2–3	0–0	4–2		1–1	1–2	3–1
Pasaquina	0–3	0–3	3–0	0–2	1–2	1–1	0–2	1–0	2–1		1–1	1–0
Santa Tecla	1–0	1–0	4–0	1–0	3–0	2–0	2–0	2–2	2–0	2–0		4–1
Sonsonate	2–0	0–1	2–2	1–0	1–1	1–3	1–1	3–1	1–0	3–0	0–0	

Legend: Blue = home team win; Yellow = draw; Red = away team win.

==== Records ====
- Best home records: Santa Tecla F.C. (31 points out of 33 points)
- Worst home records: C.D. Dragon (9 points out of 33 points)
- best away records : Alianza F.C. (23 points out of 33 points)
- worst away records : Sonsonate (5 points out of 33 points)
- Most goals scored: Santa Tecla F.C. (40 goals)
- Fewest goals: C.D. Dragon (16 goals)
- Fewest goals conceded : Santa Tecla F.C. (12 goals)
- Most goals conceded : A.D. Isidro Metapan (41 goals)

==== Scoring ====
- First goal of the season: (El Salvador) Daniel Luna for Pasaquina against Audaz, 9 minutes (January 13, 2018)
- First goal by a foreign player: (Paraguay) Javier Lescano for Aguila against Chalatenango, 35 minutes (January 13, 2018)
- Fastest goal in a match: 4 minutes
  - (Paraguay) Gustavo Guerreño for Alianza F.C. against FAS (February 9, 2018)
- Goal scored at the latest point in a match: 90+3 minutes
  - (Burundi) Elias Dandi goal for Isidro Metapan against Firpo (January 28, 2018)
- First penalty Kick of the season: (Paraguay) Javier Lescano for Aguila against Chalatenango, 35 minutes (January 13, 2018)
- Widest winning margin: 4 goals
  - Santa Tecla F.C. 4–0 C.D. Audaz (2018)
- First hat-trick of the season: (El Salvador) Rodolfo Zelaya for Alianza against C.D. Chalatenango (April 15, 2018)
- First own goal of the season: (El Salvador) Nelson Moreno (Firp) for C.D. Aguila (February 19, 2018)
- Most goals in a match: 6 goals
  - TBD 4–2 TBD (August, 2017)
- Most goals by one team in a match: 4 goals
  - C.D. FAS 4–2 Firp (2018)
    Santa Tecla F.C. 4-0 C.D. Audaz (2018)
    Limeno 4–2 A.D. Isidro Metapan (2018)
- Most goals in one half by one team: 4 goals
  - TBD 5–2(1–2) TBD (2nd half, September 30, 2016)
- Most goals scored by losing team: 2 goals
  - Firpo 2–4 C.D. FAS (March 12, 2018)
    C.D. Audaz 2-3 C.D. FAS (March 8, 2018)
    C.D. Chalatenango 2-3 A.D. Isidro Metapan (February 25, 2018)
    C.D. Chalatenango 2-3 Limeno (February 22, 2018)
- Most goals by one player in a single match: 3 goals
  - (El Salvador) Rodolfo Zelaya for Alianza against C.D. Chalatenango (April 15, 2018)

=== Top goalscorers ===
No.	Player	Club	Goals
1	(Colombia) Luis Perea	FAS	14
2	(El Salvador) Diego Coca	Limeno	12
3	(Paraguay) Javier Lezcano	Aguila	12
4	(Brazil) Ricardinho	Santa Tecla	11
5	(El Salvador) Rodolfo Zelaya	Alianza	10
6	(Panama) Nicolas Munoz	Pasaquina	9
7	(El Salvador) Christopher Ramirez	Firpo	9
8	(Paraguay) Gustavo Guerreno	Alianza	8
9	(El Salvador) Irvin Herrera	FAS	7
9	(Nigeria) Fredrick Ogangan	Limeno	7

=== Individual awards ===
Hombre GOL	Best Coach Award	Best Goalkeeper Award	Fair Player Award	Rookie Player Award
(Colombia) Luis Perea; FAS	(El Salvador) Jorge Humberto Rodriguez; Alianza	(Mexico) Joel Almeida; Santa Tecla F.C.	(Uruguay) Rafael Garcia; Alianza	(El Salvador) TBD; FAS

=== Playoffs ===
Quarterfinals
6	Audaz	1	3	4
3	C.D. FAS	1	2	3
7	Limeno	1	0	1
2	Santa Tecla (s)	1	0	1
5	Firpo	0	0	0
4	Águila	1	0	1
8	Sonsonate	0	0	0
1	Alianza F.C.	1	4	5

Semifinals
Audaz	1	0	1
Santa Tecla	2	4	6
Águila	2	0	2
Alianza F.C.	3	2	5

Finals
Santa Tecla	0
Alianza F.C.	1

==== Quarterfinals ====
Team 1	Agg.	Team 2	1st leg	2nd leg
FAS	3–4	Audaz	1–1	2-3
C.D. Aguila	1–0	Firpo	0–1	0–0
Santa Tecla	1-1 (s)	Limeno	1–1	0–0
Alianza	5–0	Sonsonate	0–1	4–0

1. ^{†} Order of legs reversed.

==== First leg ====
May 1, 2018
15:00 UTC−6

Audaz	1-1	FAS
Santos Guzman 62'		Romeo Monteagudo (o.g.)

Estadio Jiboa
Referee: Ivan Barton

May 3, 2017
19:00 UTC−6

Firpo	0-1	Aguila
None		Tony Rugamas 75'

Estadio Cuscatlan
Referee: Ismael Cornejo Melendez

May 3, 2018
15:00 UTC−6

Sonsonate	0-1	Alianza
None		Óscar Cerén 77'

Estadio Ana Mercedo
Sonsonate
Referee: Jaime Herrera Bonilla

May 1, 2018
15:30 UTC−6

Limeno	1-1	Santa Tecla
Fredrick Ogangan 34'		Gilberto Baires 20'

Estadio Jose Ramon Flores, Santa Rosa de Lima
Referee: Edgar Ramirez

===== Second leg =====
May 6, 2018
15:00 UTC−6

FAS	2-3	Audaz
Irvin Herrera 39'; Luis Perea 62'		Carlos Anzora 53'; Daley Mena 67' 90'

Estadio Óscar Quiteño, Santa Ana
Referee: German Martinez

Audaz won 4-3 on aggregate.

May 6, 2018
19:00 UTC−6

Aguila	0-0	Firpo
None		None

Juan Francisco Barraza,
San Miguel, El Salvador
Referee: Joel Aguilar Chicas

Aguila won 1-0 on aggregate.

May 6, 2018
15:00 UTC−6

Alianza	0-0	Sonsonate
Portillo 8'; Narciso Orellana 38'; Rudy Valencia 77'; Ivan Mancia 80'		None

Estadio Cuscatlan
San Salvador

Alianza won 5-0 on aggregate.

May 5, 2018
19:00 UTC−6

Santa Tecla	0–0	Limeno
None		None

Estadio Las Delicias, Santa Tecla, El Salvador
Referee: Hector Salazar

1-1. Santa Tecla advanced as the higher seeded team.

==== Semifinals ====
Team 1	Agg.	Team 2	1st leg	2nd leg
Audaz	1-6	Santa Tecla	1-2	4-0
Aguila	2-5	Alianza	2-3	2-0

===== First leg =====
May 10, 2018
15:30 UTC−6

Audaz	1-2	Santa Tecla
Santos Guzman 84'		Wilma Torres 18'; Harold Alas 51'

Estadio Jiboa, San Vicente
Referee: Ismael Cornejo

May 10, 2018
15:30 UTC−6

Aguila	2-3	Alianza
Javier Lezcano 54' 75'		Herbert Sosa 65'; Henry Romero 78'; Rodolfo Zelaya 92'

Estadio Juan francisco Barraza, San Miguel
Referee: German Martinez

===== Second leg =====
May 13, 2018
17:30 UTC−6

Santa Tecla	4-0	Audaz
Ricardinho 9' (pen.), 34'; Wilam Torres 20'; Kevin Reyes 65'		None

Estadio Las Delicias, Santa Tecla

Santa Tecla won 5-2 on aggregate.

May 13, 2018
15:00 UTC−6

Alianza	2-0	Aguila
Oscar Ceren 4' 45'		None

Estadio Cuscatlan

Alianza won 5-2 on aggregate.

==== Final ====
May 20, 2018
15:00 UTC−6

Alianza	1-0	Santa Tecla
Marvin Monterrosa 40'		None

Estadio Cuscatlán, San Salvador
Attendance: TBD
Referee: Joel Aguilar Chicas

Alianza F.C.
GK	1	(Uruguay) Víctor García
DF	28	(El Salvador) Rudy Clavel	(yellow card) 17'	(substituted off) 59'
DF	20	(Uruguay) Darío Ferreira
DF	2	(El Salvador) Ivan Mancía
DF	15	(El Salvador) Jonathan Jiménez
MF	21	(El Salvador) Marvin Monterrosa		(substituted off) 82' (goal) 40'
MF	6	(El Salvador) Narciso Orellana	(yellow card) 49'
MF	27	(El Salvador) Issac Portillo	(yellow card) 51'
MF	9	(El Salvador) Óscar Cerén	(yellow card) 86'
FW	10	(El Salvador) Herbert Sosa	(yellow card) 23'
ST	18	(Paraguay) Gustavo Guerreño		(substituted off) 60'
Substitutes:
FW	22	(El Salvador) Rodolfo Zelaya		(substituted on) 60'
MF	17	(El Salvador) Alexander Larín		(substituted on) 59'
FW	10	(El Salvador) Juan Carlos Portillo		(substituted on) 82'
Manager:
(El Salvador) Jorge Humberto Rodriguez

Santa Tecla F.C.
GK	1	(Mexico) Joel Almeida
DF	5	(El Salvador) Alexander Mendoza
DF	23	(Colombia) Elieser Quinones	(yellow card) 23'
DF	19	(El Salvador) William Canales
MF	20	(El Salvador) Andres Jaco Flores
MF	31	(El Salvador) Kevin Reyes		(substituted off) 73'
MF	43	(El Salvador) Fernando Quintanilla
MF	21	(El Salvador) Wilma Torres	(yellow card) 72'
MF	11	(El Salvador) Gilberto Baires	(yellow card) 22'
FW	22	(Brazil) Ricardinho		(substituted off) 65' (yellow card) 51'
FW	7	(El Salvador) Harold Alas		(substituted off) 55'
Substitutes:
MF	10	(El Salvador) Gerson Mayen		(substituted on) 55'
FW	14	(Uruguay) Liber Quinones		(substituted on) 65'
MF	33	(El Salvador) Jacobo Moreno		(substituted on) 73'
Manager:
(Uruguay) Ruben Da Silva

Clausura 2018 champions

13th title

== List of foreign players in the league ==
This is a list of foreign players in the 2017–18 season. The following players:

1. Have played at least one game for the respective club.
2. Have not been capped for the El Salvador national football team on any level, independently from the birthplace

A new rule was introduced this season, that clubs can have four foreign players per club and can only add a new player if there is an injury or a player is released and it's before the close of the season transfer window.

Águila
- (Colombia) James Cabezas
- (Colombia) Yair Ibargüen
- (Paraguay) Javier Lezcano
- (Panama) Richard Dixon
- (Colombia) José Ramírez
- (Colombia) Jaime Sierra
- (Argentina) Damián Óscar Luna

Alianza
- (Colombia) Luis Hinestroza
- (Paraguay) Gustavo Guerreño
- (Uruguay) Darío Ferreira
- (Uruguay) Víctor Rafael García

Audaz
- (Colombia) Jerson Steven Aguilar
- (Colombia) Eduard Steven Rodríguez
- (Colombia) Alonso Umaña Popo
- (Colombia) Daley Mena
- (Colombia) Tardelis Peña González
- (Argentina) Cristian Sánchez Prette
- (Honduras) Milton Geovanny Palacios

Chalatenango
- (Colombia) Bladimir Diaz
- (Colombia) Carlos Fernando Angulo
- (Colombia) Yohalin Palacios
- (Colombia) Wílmar Hernández

Dragón
- (Brazil) Josielson Moraes
- (Colombia) Harold Contreras
- (Colombia) Carlos Urrego
- (Colombia) Jefferson Viveros
- (Colombia) Cristian Pinzón
- (Colombia) Jhonny Riascos
- (Colombia) Yuberney Franco

FAS
- (Argentina) Guillermo Stradella
- (Argentina) Matías Coloca
- (Argentina) Allan Muraldo
- (Colombia) Teobaldo Quezada
- (Argentina) Juan Aimar
- (Colombia) Luis Alberto Perea

Firpo
- (Colombia) Jhony Rios
- (Venezuela) César Iván González
- (Venezuela) Pierre Alexandre Pluchino Galuppo
- (Jamaica) François Swaby
- (Colombia) Mahecha Bermúdez
- (Argentina) Rodrigo de Brito
- (Trinidad and Tobago) Ricardo John

Isidro Metapán
- (Cameroon) Ayukokata Ndip
- (United States) Matthias Bonvehi
- (Mexico) German Ramírez Urenda
- (Jamaica) Mckauly Tulloch
- (Colombia) Jefferson Viveros
- (United States) Ricardo Velazco
- (Panama) Ameth Ramírez
- (Burundi) Elias Dandi

Limeño
- (Paraguay) Jeremías Pereira
- (Paraguay) Jorge Cáceres
- (Paraguay) Andrés Britez
- (Nigeria) Counsellor Fredrick Ogangan
- (United States) Wilfredo Cienfuegos
- (Honduras) Clayvin Zuniga
- (Argentina) Fernando Gutierrez

Pasaquina
- (Brazil) Jackson de Oliveira
- (Colombia) Luis Palacios
- (Trinidad and Tobago) Leston Paul
- (Trinidad and Tobago) Dwane James Ronaldo
- (Saint Kitts and Nevis) Devaughn Elliott
- (Colombia) Jeison Quiñones

Sonsonate
- (Brazil) Zé Paulo
- (Guatemala) Franklin Eduardo García
- (Paraguay) David Leonardo Alcaraz
- (Panama) Armando Polo
- (Jamaica) Mckauly Tulloch
- (Uruguay) Nicolás Fagúndez
- (Mexico) José Manuel Rivera
- (Nicaragua) Luis Fernando Copete

Santa Tecla
- (Brazil) Ricardinho
- (Mexico) Joel Almeida
- (Paraguay) Lorenzo Rodrigo Frutos
- (Brazil) Wanderson Silveiro Echeverría
- (Uruguay) Liber Quiñones
- (Colombia) Yosimar Quiñónez

(player released during the Apertura season) (player released between the Apertura and Clausura seasons) (player released during the Clausura season)

== Aggregate table ==
Pos	Team	Pld	W	D	L	GF	GA	GD	Pts	Qualification or relegation
1	Alianza	44	30	11	3	83	48	+35	101	2019 CONCACAF Champions League (Note: As Apertura champion and team with the best accumulation of points)
2	Santa Tecla	44	24	14	6	67	54	+13	86	2018 CONCACAF League (Note: As Apertura and Clausura runners-up)
3	FAS	44	22	13	9	48	49	−1	79	2018 CONCACAF League (Note: As non-finalists with best aggregate)
4	Águila	44	15	15	14	50	28	+22	60	
5	Isidro Metapán	44	15	11	18	60	47	+13	56	
6	Municipal Limeno	44	13	11	20	57	61	−4	50	
7	Pasaquina	44	11	16	17	52	58	−6	49	
8	Audaz	44	13	10	21	54	80	−26	49	
9	Chalatenango	44	12	12	20	53	75	−22	48	
10	Firpo	44	9	19	16	60	66	−6	46	
11	Sonsonate	44	9	16	19	59	57	+2	43	Segunda División
12	Dragón	44	9	16	19	43	63	−20	43	Segunda División

Rules for classification: 1) points; 2) goal difference; 3) number of goals scored.

=== Relegation playoff ===
1 May 2018
19:00

C.D. Sonsonate	3-2	C.D. Dragon
José Manuel Rivera 58'; Nicolás Fagúndez (pen.), 64'; McKauly Tulloch 84'		Mártir Contreras (pen.), 85'; Isaí Aguilar 95'

Estadio Cuscatlan
Attendance: 1,334
Referee: Joel Aguilar Chicas
