= Frione =

Frione is an Italian surname. Notable people with the surname include:

- Francisco Frione (1912–1935), Uruguayan-Italian footballer
- Ricardo Frione (1911–1986), Uruguayan footballer
