= Zé Paulo =

Zé Paulo may refer to:

- Zé Paulo (footballer, born 1987), Brazilian football player, full name José Paulo dos Santos
- Zé Paulo (footballer, born 1994), Brazilian football player, full name José Paulo de Oliveira Pinto
