= Francisco Frione =

Uruguayan-Italian footballer (1912-1935)

Personal information
- Date of birth: 21 July 1912
- Place of birth: Montevideo, Uruguay
- Date of death: 17 February 1935 (aged 22)
- Place of death: Milan, Italy
- Position: Midfielder

Senior career*
Years	Team	Apps	(Gls)
1931–1932	Montevideo Wanderers		
1932–1935	Ambrosiana-Inter	54	(12)

International career
	Uruguay	6	(0)
- * Club domestic league appearances and goals

Francisco Frione, also known as Francesco Frione (21 July 1912 – 17 February 1935), was an Uruguayan-Italian professional football player. He was born in Uruguay and played for the Uruguay national football team, but later was naturalized as an Italian citizen and played for the Italian national B team.

Frione's family was of Ligurian descent, from the city of Finale Ligure.

== Career ==
Frione scored 7 goals in 20 appearances for Montevideo Wanderers F.C. before moving to Italy in 1932.

His older brother Ricardo Alberto Frione also played football professionally. To distinguish them, Ricardo Alberto was referred to as Frione I and Francisco as Frione II.
