= Emiliano Barrera =

Argentine footballer and manager

Personal information
- Full name: Emiliano Santiago Barrera
- Date of birth: 31 December 1981 (age 44)
- Place of birth: Rosario, Santa Fe, Argentina
- Position: Defender

Youth career
- Newell's Old Boys

Senior career*
Years	Team	Apps	(Gls)
2001	Colón		
2002–2003	Unión Santa Fe		
2004	Partizani Tirana		
2005	Sol de América	3	(0)
2005	Aurora FC		
2006	Huracán Corrientes		
2007–2009	Grupo Universitario		
2010	Boca Unidos		
2011	Atlético Paraná		
2012	San Lorenzo de Alem		
2013–2015	Talleres de Perico		

Managerial career
- 2016: Deportivo Guastatoya (youth)
- 2016: Deportivo Guastatoya (assistant)
- 2016: Atlético Policial
- 2017: Deportivo Sebaco
- 2017: Deportivo Ocotal
- 2018: Municipal Limeño
- 2018: Rosario FC
- 2019: San Pedro FC
- 2020-2021: San Juan FC
- 2022: San Pedro FC
- * Club domestic league appearances and goals

Emiliano Santiago Barrera (born 31 December 1981) is an Argentine football manager and former player.

== Career ==
A defender, Barrera played in his homeland, Albania, Paraguay and Guatemala. Abroad, he played for Partizani Tirana, Sol de América, and Aurora FC.

As a football coach, he started his career with Guatemalan club Deportivo Guastatoya in 2016 as both the youth teams coach and assistant of the first team. Back to Argentina, he coached Atlético Policial.

In 2018, Barrerra led Municipal Limeño.
