= Darío Ferreira =

Uruguayan footballer (born 1987)

Personal information
- Date of birth: 9 February 1987 (age 39)
- Place of birth: Rocha, Uruguay
- Height: 1.81 m (5 ft 11 in)
- Position: Forward

Team information
- Current team: Rocha F.C.

Senior career*
Years	Team	Apps	(Gls)
2007–2008	Nacional	8	(0)
2008–2009	Bella Vista	17	(0)
2009–2010	Montevideo Wanderers	11	(0)
2010–2011	Cerro	17	(0)
2011–2012	Boca Unidos	16	(0)
2011–2012	Club Atlético Alvarado	19	(2)
2013–2015	Rocha F.C.	41	(7)
2016–2017	Deportivo Maldonado	20	(1)
2017–2018	Alianza	73	(7)
2019–2020	Xelajú	31	(3)
2020–	Rocha F.C.	16	(1)
Medal record
Alianza
Winner	Primera División	2017 Apertura
Winner	Primera División	2018 Clausura
- * Club domestic league appearances and goals as of 20:00, 31 October 2023 (UTC)

Darío Ferreira (born 9 February 1987 in Rocha) is a Uruguayan professional footballer, who currently plays as a forward for Rocha F.C. in the Uruguayan Primera División Amateur.

== Teams ==
- (Uruguay) Nacional 2007–2008
- (Uruguay) Bella Vista 2008–2009
- (Uruguay) Montevideo Wanderers 2009–2010
- (Uruguay) Cerro 2010–2011
- (Argentina) Boca Unidos 2011–2012
- (Argentina) Alvarado de Mar del Plata 2012–2013
- (Uruguay) Rocha F.C. 2013–2015
- (Uruguay) Deportivo Maldonado 2016-2017
- (El Salvador) Alianza 2017–2018
- (Guatemala) Xelajú 2019–Presente
