= Raúl Banfi =

Uruguayan footballer

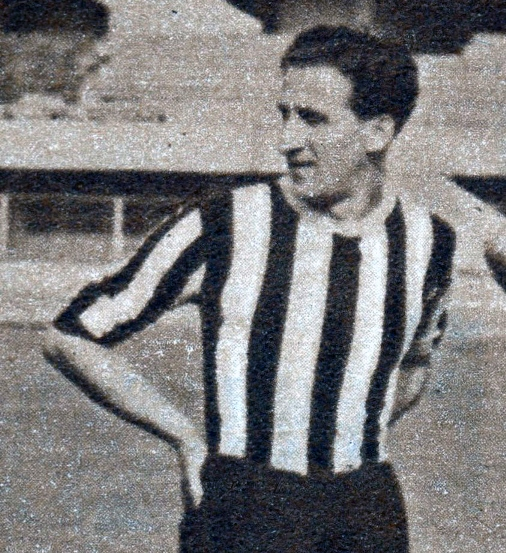

Personal information
- Date of birth: November 14, 1914
- Place of birth: La Paz, Canelones, Uruguay
- Date of death: December 10, 1982
- Place of death: Salto, Salto, Uruguay
- Height: 1.81 m (5 ft 11 1/2 in)
- Position: Striker

Senior career*
Years	Team	Apps	(Gls)
1937–1939	Racing Club		
1939–1941	Modena	40	(31)
1941–1942	Juventus	12	(4)
1942–1944	Modena	34	(17)
1945–1946	Mantova	9	(4)
1946–1947	Prato	14	(1)
- * Club domestic league appearances and goals

Raúl Banfi (born November 14, 1914, date of death unknown) was an Uruguayan professional football player. He was born in La Paz, Canelones. He also held Italian citizenship.
