= Marcel Román =

Uruguayan footballer (born in 1988)

Personal information
- Full name: Marcel Nicolás Román Núñez
- Date of birth: 7 February 1988 (age 38)
- Place of birth: Montevideo, Uruguay
- Height: 1.75 m (5 ft 9 in)
- Position: Midfielder

Team information
- Current team: Rampla Juniors
- Number: 6

Youth career
- Danubio

Senior career*
Years	Team	Apps	(Gls)
2006–2007	Danubio	16	(0)
2008	Peñarol	15	(0)
2008–2011	Genoa	1	(0)
2009	→ Frosinone (loan)	1	(0)
2009–2010	→ Peñarol (loan)	17	(1)
2010–2011	→ Iraklis (loan)	3	(0)
2011–2013	Cerro	7	(0)
2013	Bella Vista	9	(0)
2013–2014	Prato	27	(1)
2014–2015	Rampla Juniors	34	(0)
2016–2018	Oriente Petrolero	113	(1)
2020–2021	Real Santa Cruz	18	(0)
2021–	Rampla Juniors	11	(0)

International career
2007	Uruguay U20	12	(0)
- * Club domestic league appearances and goals as of 12:18, 26 December 2021 (UTC)

Marcel Nicolás Román Núñez (born 7 February 1988, in Montevideo) is an Uruguayan footballer who plays for Rampla Juniors.

== Career ==
=== Club career ===
After a year without club, Román returned to the pitch in January 2020, signing with Bolivian Primera División club Real Santa Cruz. He left the club in July 2021. Shortly after, he joined Rampla Juniors.
