= Washington Cacciavillani =

Uruguayan footballer and coach (1934-1999)

Personal information
- Date of birth: January 1, 1934
- Place of birth: Salto, Uruguay
- Date of death: 6 September 1997
- Position: Midfielder

Senior career*
Years	Team	Apps	(Gls)
1953–1955	River Plate		
1955–1957	Pro Patria	31	(3)
1957–1958	Internazionale	1	(0)
1958–1959	Sarom Ravenna	17	(1)
1959–1960	Casertana	24	(4)
1960–1967	Siracusa	163	(6)
1967–1970	Floridia		

Managerial career
- Siracusa (youth)
- 1975–1976: Cosenza
- 1976–1978: Ragusa
- 1981–1983: Trapani
- * Club domestic league appearances and goals

Washington Cacciavillani (January 1, 1934 in Salto – 6 September 1997) was an Uruguayan professional football player and coach. He also held Italian citizenship.
