= Zé Paulo (footballer, born 1987) =

Brazilian footballer

Personal information
- Full name: José Paulo dos Santos
- Date of birth: May 16, 1987 (age 39)
- Place of birth: Recife, Brazil
- Height: 1.80 m (5 ft 11 in)
- Position: Striker

Youth career
- 2004: ABB-BA

Senior career*
Years	Team	Apps	(Gls)
2004–2007	Sport		
2006	→ Ypiranga-PE (Loan)		
2006	→ Confiança-SE (Loan)		
2008	Salgueiro		
2009–2010	Confiança		
2009	→ Joinville (Loan)		
2010	Mixto		
2011	Paraná		
2011	Luverdense		
2011	Santa Cruz		
2016–2017	Sonsonate FC	68	(17)
2017–2018	CD Suchitepéquez		
2018–2019	AD Isidro Metapán	24	(8)
2019	CD Municipal Limeño		
- * Club domestic league appearances and goals

José Paulo dos Santos or simply Zé Paulo (born May 16, 1987 in Recife), is a Brazilian professional football player, who plays as a striker.

== Club career ==
=== Sonsonate ===
Dos Santos signed with Sonsonate of the Salvadoran Primera División in the Apertura 2016 tournament. In January 2017, Dos Santos scored two goals in a 2–1 victory against Municipal Limeño in the Estadio Anna Mercedes Campos. With Sonsonate, Dos Santos scored 17 goals in 68 matches.

=== Suchitepéquez ===
Dos Santos signed with Suchitepéquez of Guatemala in 2017.

=== Isidro Metapán ===
In May 2018, Dos Santos signed with Isidro Metapán for the Apertura 2018. In November 2018, Dos Santos scored 2 goals against Chalatenango in a 3–1 victory in the Estadio Jorge Calero Suárez. Dos Santos scored 8 goals in 24 games at the end of the tournament.

In November 2018, Isidro Metapán reached the quarterfinals of the Apertura 2018, but they were eliminated by FAS 0–2 on aggregate.
