= Jorge Casanova (footballer, born 1976) =

Uruguayan footballer and manager

Personal information
- Full name: Jorge Daniel Casanova
- Date of birth: July 26, 1976 (age 50)
- Place of birth: Sauce, Uruguay
- Height: 1.83 m (6 ft 0 in)
- Position: Midfielder

Senior career*
Years	Team	Apps	(Gls)
1995–1999	Bella Vista	55	(5)
1999–2000	Lecce	1	(0)
2001	Ravenna	15	(0)
2002	Peñarol	15	(1)
2002–2003	Bella Vista	14	(1)
2004–2005	Chacarita Juniors	16	(3)
2005	Unión de Santa Fe	1	(0)
2006–2007	Bella Vista	14	(1)
2007–2008	Bucaramanga	25	(3)
2008–2009	Once Caldas	36	(4)
2009–2010	Junior	48	(2)
2011–2013	Bella Vista	28	(2)
Total		308	(26)

Managerial career
- 2015–2017: Villa Española
- 2017: Águila
- 2020–Present: Bella Vista
- * Club domestic league appearances and goals

Jorge Daniel Casanova (born July 26, 1976, in Sauce, Uruguay) is a Uruguayan former professional football player and current manager.

== Playing career ==
- (Uruguay) Bella Vista 1995–1999
- (Italy) Lecce 1999–2000
- (Italy) Ravenna 2001
- (Uruguay) Peñarol 2002
- (Uruguay) Bella Vista 2002–2003
- (Argentina) Chacarita Juniors 2004–2005
- (Argentina) Unión de Santa Fe 2005
- (Uruguay) Bella Vista 2006–2007
- (Colombia) Atlético Bucaramanga 2007–2008
- (Colombia) Once Caldas 2008–2009
- (Colombia) Atlético Junior 2009–2010
- (Uruguay) Bella Vista 2011–2013

== Coaching career ==
- (Uruguay) Sud América 2014–2015 (assistant manager)
- (Uruguay) C.S.D. Villa Española 2015–2017
- (El Salvador) Águila 2017
- (Uruguay) Bella Vista 2020–present

== Honors ==
- (Colombia) Once Caldas 2008 (Copa Columbia, Runner Up)
- (Colombia) Once Caldas 2009 (Torneo Apertura, Copa Mustang)
- (Colombia) Atlético Junior 2010 (Torneo Apertura, Copa Mustang)
