= Ricardo Frione =

Uruguayan footballer (1911-1986)

Personal information
- Full name: Ricardo Alberto Frione
- Date of birth: February 7, 1911
- Place of birth: Montevideo, Uruguay
- Date of death: March 11, 1986 (aged 75)
- Position: Striker

Senior career*
Years	Team	Apps	(Gls)
1931–1932	Montevideo Wanderers		
1932	Ambrosiana-Inter	1	(2)
1933	Torres Sassari	3	(5)
1933–1936	Sanremese		
1936–1937	Cosenza		
1937–1938	Salernitana	?	(3)
1938–1939	Sanremese	12	(3)
1939	Servette		
1940	Biellese	15	(3)
1940–1944	Parma	66	(24)
- * Club domestic league appearances and goals

Ricardo Alberto Frione (first name also spelled Riccardo; February 7, 1911 in Montevideo – March 11, 1986) was an Uruguay professional football player. He also held Italian citizenship due to his Italian descent.

His younger brother Francisco Frione also played football professionally. To distinguish them, Ricardo Alberto was referred to as Frione I and Francisco as Frione II.
