= 1994 FIFA World Cup qualification (CONCACAF) =

Tournament statistics
- Top scorer(s): (Bermuda) Shaun Goater (Mexico) Francisco Uribe (7 goals each)

Listed below are the dates and results for the 1994 FIFA World Cup qualification rounds for the North, Central American and Caribbean zone (CONCACAF).

A total of 24 CONCACAF teams entered the competition. The North, Central American and Caribbean zone was allocated 2.25 places (out of 24) in the final tournament. The United States, as hosts, qualified automatically, leaving 1.25 spot open for competition between 22 teams, because Cuba (Caribbean group) withdrew before playing.

There would be three rounds of play. Mexico and Canada received byes and advanced to the second round directly. The remaining 20 teams were divided into two zones, based on geographical considerations.

== Format ==
- Caribbean Zone: The 14 teams played in knockout matches on a home-and-away basis to determine three winners advancing to the second round.
- Central American Zone: The six teams were paired up to play knockout matches on a home-and-away basis. The winners would advance to the second round.

In the second round, the eight teams were divided into two groups of four teams each. They played against each other on a home-and-away basis. The group winners and runners-up would advance to the final round.

In the final round, the four teams played against each other on a home-and-away basis. The group winner would qualify. The runner-up would advance to the CONCACAF–OFC intercontinental play-off.

== Caribbean Zone ==
=== First preliminary round ===
Team 1	Agg.	Team 2	1st leg	2nd leg
Dominican Republic	2–3	Puerto Rico	1–2	1–1
Saint Lucia	2–3	Saint Vincent and the Grenadines	1–0	1–3

21 March 1992

Dominican Republic	1–2	Puerto Rico
Rodríguez 67'		Lugris 23'; Borja 57'

Estadio Olímpico Félix Sánchez, Santo Domingo, Dominican Republic
Attendance: 300
Referee: Lancelotte Livingston (Jamaica)
29 March 1992

Puerto Rico	1–1	Dominican Republic
Paonessa 6'		Rodríguez 3'

Hato Rey, San Juan
Attendance: 300
Referee: Errol Forbes (Trinidad and Tobago)

Puerto Rico advanced to the second preliminary round, 3–2 on aggregate.

22 March 1992

Saint Lucia	1–0	Saint Vincent and the Grenadines
Jean 5'

Mindoo Philip Park, Castries
Attendance: 6,000
Referee: Weldo Peleris (Haiti)
29 March 1992

Saint Vincent and the Grenadines	3–1	Saint Lucia
Joseph 33'; Jack 56'; Brown 66'		Jean 22'

Arnos Vale Stadium, Kingstown
Attendance: 5,000
Referee: Ramesh Ramdhan (Trinidad and Tobago)

Saint Vincent and the Grenadines advanced to the second preliminary round, 3–2 on aggregate.

=== Second preliminary round ===
Team 1	Agg.	Team 2	1st leg	2nd leg
Bermuda	2–2(a)	Haiti	1–0	1–2
Jamaica	3–1	Puerto Rico	2–1	1–0
Netherlands Antilles	1–4	Antigua and Barbuda	1–1	0–3
Guyana	2–3	Suriname	1–2	1–1
Barbados	1–5	Trinidad and Tobago	1–2	0–3
Saint Vincent and the Grenadines	w/o	Cuba	-	-

26 April 1992

Bermuda	1–0	Haiti
Goater 87'

Hamilton
Attendance: 25,500
Referee: Raul Dominguez (United States)
25 May 1992

Haiti	2–1	Bermuda
Eliezar 24', 34'		Goater 20'

Stade Sylvio Cator, Port-au-Prince
Attendance: 6,000
Referee: Lancelotte Livingston (Jamaica)

2–2 on aggregate. Bermuda advanced to the first round on away goals.

23 May 1992

Jamaica	2–1	Puerto Rico
Hyde 57'; Wilson 67'		Espinoza 3'

Independence Park, Kingston
Attendance: 3,057
Referee: David Harewood (Trinidad and Tobago)
30 May 1992

Puerto Rico	0–1	Jamaica
		Wright 31'

Hato Rey, San Juan
Referee: Dino Bucci (Canada)

Jamaica advanced to the first round, 3–1 on aggregate.

19 April 1992

Netherlands Antilles	1–1	Antigua and Barbuda
Regales 38'		Clarke 31'

Willemstad
Attendance: 10,000
Referee: Willie Stewart (Trinidad and Tobago)
26 April 1992

Antigua and Barbuda	3–0	Netherlands Antilles
Edwards 6', 75', 85'

Antigua Recreation Ground, St. John's
Attendance: 5,000
Referee: Denis Niles (Saint Lucia)

Antigua and Barbuda advanced to the first round, 4–1 on aggregate.

24 April 1992

Guyana	1–2	Suriname
Stanton 43'		Simson 52'; Leyman 68'

Bourda, Georgetown
Attendance: 3,500
Referee: Ramesh Ramdhan (Trinidad and Tobago)
25 May 1992

Suriname	1–1	Guyana
Godlieb 2'		Archer 48'

Paramaribo
Attendance: 5,000
Referee: Charles Barrett (Jamaica)

Suriname advanced to the first round, 3–2 on aggregate.

19 April 1992

Barbados	1–2	Trinidad and Tobago
White 55'		Latapy 20'; Charles 66'

Hadley Court Stadium, Bridgetown
Attendance: 5,600
Referee: Timothy Joseph (Saint Lucia)
31 May 1992

Trinidad and Tobago	3–0	Barbados
Faustin 63'; Jamerson 72'; Lewis 74'

Queen's Park Oval, Port of Spain
Attendance: 13,000
Referee: Noel Smith (Jamaica)

Trinidad and Tobago advanced to the first round, 5–1 on aggregate.

Saint Vincent and the Grenadines	w/o	Cuba
		withdrew

Cuba withdrew, so Saint Vincent and the Grenadines advanced to the first round automatically.

=== First round ===
Team 1	Agg.	Team 2	1st leg	2nd leg
Antigua and Barbuda	1–5	Bermuda	0–3	1–2
Trinidad and Tobago	2–3	Jamaica	1–2	1–1
Suriname	1–2	Saint Vincent and the Grenadines	0–0	1–2

14 June 1992

Antigua and Barbuda	0–3	Bermuda
		Thompson 21'; Cann 70'; Jennings 79'

Antigua Recreation Ground, St. John's
Attendance: 5,000
Referee: Noel Smith (Jamaica)
4 July 1992

Bermuda	2–1	Antigua and Barbuda
Goater 42', 47'		Ivor 17'

Bermuda National Stadium, Hamilton
Attendance: 4,000
Referee: Jose Antonio Garzay Ochoa (Mexico)

Bermuda advanced to the second round, 5–1 on aggregate.

5 July 1992

Trinidad and Tobago	1–2	Jamaica
Charles 80'		Isaacs 52'; Anglin 65'

Queen's Park Oval, Port of Spain
Attendance: 20,000
Referee: Jack D'Aquila (United States)
16 August 1992

Jamaica	1–1	Trinidad and Tobago
Davis 28'		Haynes 41'

Independence Park, Kingston, Jamaica
Attendance: 16,000
Referee: Jose Refugio Ramirez (Mexico)

Jamaica advanced to the second round, 3–2 on aggregate.

2 August 1992

Suriname	0–0	Saint Vincent and the Grenadines

Paramaribo
Attendance: 6,000
Referee: Ramesh Ramdhan (Trinidad and Tobago)
30 August 1992

Saint Vincent and the Grenadines	2–1	Suriname
Joseph 31'; Dupont 81'		Francis 17'

Arnos Vale Stadium, Kingstown
Attendance: 5,000
Referee: Alwyn Black (Saint Lucia)

Saint Vincent and the Grenadines, along with Jamaica and Bermuda, advanced to the second round, both matches of each teams on aggregate.

== Central American Zone ==
=== First round ===
Team 1	Agg.	Team 2	1st leg	2nd leg
Guatemala	0–2	Honduras	0–0	0–2
Nicaragua	1–10	El Salvador	0–5	1–5
Panama	2–5	Costa Rica	1–0	1–5

19 July 1992

Guatemala	0–0	Honduras

Estadio Mateo Flores, Guatemala City
Attendance: 39,792
Referee: Majid Jay (USA)
26 July 1992

Honduras	2–0	Guatemala
Obando 86'; Suazo 88'

Estadio Tiburcio Carías Andino, Tegucigalpa
Attendance: 37,500
Referee: José Ramírez (Mexico)

Honduras advanced to the second round, 2–0 on aggregate.

19 July 1992

Nicaragua	0–5	El Salvador
		Estrada 3'; González 17', 78'; Castro 21'; Ulloa 73'

Managua
Attendance: 4,642
Referee: Ramón Méndez (Costa Rica)
23 July 1992

El Salvador	5–1	Nicaragua
Castro 14', 47'; Cienfuegos 34'; González 48'; Ulloa 67'		César Rostrán 65'

Estadio Cuscatlán, San Salvador
Attendance: 8,272
Referee: José Luis Fuentes (Honduras)

El Salvador advanced to the second round, 10–1 on aggregate.

16 August 1992

Panama	1–0	Costa Rica
Mendieta 29' (pen.)

Estadio Rommel Fernández, Panama City
Attendance: 21,000
Referee: Armando Pérez (Colombia)
23 August 1992

Costa Rica	5–1	Panama
Berry 17' (pen.); Ramírez 20'; Arguedas 28', 33'; Astua 84'		Mendieta 89' (pen.)

Antiguo Estadio Nacional de Costa Rica, San José
Attendance: 25,000
Referee: Jack D'Aquila (USA)

Costa Rica advanced to the second round, 5–2 on aggregate.

== Second round ==
=== Group A ===
Rank	Team	Pts	Pld	W	D	L	GF	GA	GD
1	Mexico	9	6	4	1	1	22	3	+19
2	Honduras	9	6	4	1	1	14	6	+8
3	Costa Rica	6	6	3	0	3	11	9	+2
4	Saint Vincent and the Grenadines	0	6	0	0	6	0	29	−29

Mexico and Honduras advanced to the final round.

8 November 1992

Costa Rica	2–3	Honduras
Berry 2'; Arnáez 35'		Flores 47'; Smith 70'; Obando 80'

Antiguo Estadio Nacional de Costa Rica, San José
Attendance: 15,000
Referee: Rafael Rodriguez Medina (El Salvador)

8 November 1992

Saint Vincent and the Grenadines	0–4	Mexico
		Zague 21'; Suárez 55'; Uribe 73', 78'

Arnos Vale Stadium, Kingstown
Attendance: 5,000
Referee: Noel Smith (Jamaica)
Team details

Saint Vincent and the Grenadines	Mexico

GK	1	Fitzgerald Bramble	(substituted off) 5'
RB	2	Keith Ollivierre
CB	3	Randy Patrick
CB	4	Fitzgerald Crick
LB	5	Christopher Harry
RM	7	Curtis Joseph
CM	6	Kendall Velox
CM	8	Verbin Sutherland
LM	11	Garfield Cupid
CF	9	Alexander Morris
LF	10	Rodney Jack	(substituted off) 46'
Substitutes:
LM	17	Derek Dupont	(substituted on) 46'
GK	12	Elton Johnson	(substituted on) 5'
Manager:

GK	1	Jorge Campos
RB	2	Ignacio Ambriz
CB	4	Claudio Suarez
CB	3	Ramirez Perales
LB	5	Guillermo Muñoz
RM	10	Jose Manuel de la Torre	(substituted off) 65'
CM	6	Miguel España
CM	8	Alberto Garcia Aspe
LM	7	Missael Espinoza
RF	11	Carlos Hermosillo
LF	9	Luis Roberto Alves	(substituted off) 65'
Substitutes:
CM	16	Jaime Ordiales	(substituted on) 65'
CF	22	Francisco Uribe	(substituted on) 65'
Manager:
(Argentina) Cesar Luis Menotti

15 November 1992

Mexico	2–0	Honduras
De la Torre 12'; Uribe 62'

Estadio Azul, Mexico City
Attendance: 34,413
Referee: Raul Dominguez (United States)
Team details

Mexico	Honduras

GK	1	Jorge Campos
RB	2	Ignacio Ambriz
CB	3	Ramirez Perales	(yellow card) 77' (yellow-red card)
CB	4	Claudio Suarez
LB	5	Guillermo Muñoz
RM	10	Jose Manuel de la Torre
CM	6	Miguel España
CM	8	Alberto Garcia Aspe		(substituted off) 46'
LM	7	Missael Espinoza
RF	11	Carlos Hermosillo		(substituted off) 46'
LF	9	Luis Roberto Alves
Substitutes:
RF	21	Luis Garcia		(substituted on) 46'
CF	22	Francisco Uribe		(substituted on) 46'
Manager:
(Argentina) Cesar Luis Menotti

GK	1	Wilmer Cruz
RB	2	Marco Anariba		(substituted off) 68'
CB	3	Pastor Martinez
CB	4	Juan Castro	(yellow card) 46'
LB	5	Hernain Arzu
RM	7	Luis Calix
CM	6	Richardson Smith	(yellow card) 33'	(substituted off) 46'
CM	8	Gilberto Yearwood
LM	10	Eugenio Dolmo Flores
RF	11	Arnold Cruz
LF	9	Juan Flores
Substitutes:
MF	13	Rudy Williams	(yellow card) 87'	(substituted on) 68'
DF	22	Cesar Obando		(substituted on) 46'
Manager:
(Uruguay) José Estanislao Malinowski

15 November 1992

Saint Vincent and the Grenadines	0–1	Costa Rica
		González 57'

Arnos Vale Stadium, Kingstown
Referee: Ramesh Ramdhan (Trinidad and Tobago)

22 November 1992

Mexico	4–0	Costa Rica
García 61', 69'; Suárez 64'; De la Torre 82'

Estadio Azul, Mexico City
Attendance: 40,000
Referee: Juan Pablo Escobar López (Guatemala)
Team details

Mexico	Costa Rica

GK	1	Jorge Campos	(yellow card) 86' (yellow-red card)
RB	2	Ignacio Ambriz
CB	3	Ruiz Esparza	(yellow card) 77' (yellow-red card)
CB	4	Claudio Suarez
LB	5	Guillermo Muñoz
RM	10	Jose Manuel de la Torre
CM	6	Miguel España		(substituted off) 46'
LM	7	Missael Espinoza
RF	11	Luis Garcia
CF	8	Francisco Uribe
LF	9	Luis Roberto Alves		(substituted off) 64'
Substitutes:
MF	21	Jaime Ordiales		(substituted on) 46'
DF	22	Alberto Garcia Aspe		(substituted on) 64'
Manager:
(Argentina) Cesar Luis Menotti

GK	1	Hermidio Barrantes
RB	2	Roger Flores	(yellow card) 47'
CB	3	Hector Marchena
CB	4	Ronald Gonzalez
LB	5	Mauricio Montero
RM	7	Floyd Guthrie	(yellow card) 31'
CM	6	German Rodriguez
CM	8	Richard Smith		(substituted off) 46'
LM	10	Benjamin Mayorga		(substituted off) 75'
RF	11	Oscar Ramirez
LF	9	Hernan Medford
Substitutes:
MF	13	Evaristo Coronado		(substituted on) 46'
DF	22	Luis Diego Arnaez		(substituted on) 75'
Manager:
Marvin Rodriguez

22 November 1992

Saint Vincent and the Grenadines	0–4	Honduras
		Flores 16', 22'; Suazo 54'; Bennett 83'

Arnos Vale Stadium, Kingstown
Attendance: 5,000
Referee: Alwyn Black (Saint Lucia)

28 November 1992

Honduras	4–0	Saint Vincent and the Grenadines
Smith 8'; Obando 24'; Flores 34'; Zelaya 86'

Estadio Tiburcio Carías Andino, Tegucigalpa
Attendance: 5,000
Referee: Mario Efrain Escobar López (Guatemala)

29 November 1992

Costa Rica	2–0	Mexico
Smith 47', 88'

Antiguo Estadio Nacional de Costa Rica, San José
Attendance: 20,000
Referee: Robert Sawtell (Canada)
Team details

Costa Rica	Mexico

GK	1	Hermidio Barrantes
RB	2	Hector Marchena	(yellow card) 36'
CB	3	Ronald Gonzalez
LB	5	Mauricio Montero
RM	7	Floyd Guthrie
CM	8	Richard Smith	(yellow card) 34'
CM	10	Benjamin Mayorga
CM	4	Austin Berry
LM	10	Oscar Ramirez
RF	11	Rolando Fonseca
LF	9	Hernan Medford
Substitutes:
MF	13	Evaristo Coronado
DF	22	Luis Diego Arnaez
Manager:
Marvin Rodriguez

GK	1	Eduardo Fernandez
RB	2	Ignacio Ambriz
CB	4	Claudio Suarez
CB	3	Ramirez Perales
LB	5	Guillermo Muñoz
RM	10	Jose Manuel de la Torre	(substituted off) 12'
CM	6	Miguel España
CM	8	Jaime Ordiales
LM	7	Missael Espinoza
RF	11	Carlos Hermosillo
LF	9	Luis Roberto Alves	(substituted off) 46'
Substitutes:
CF	21	Francisco Uribe	(substituted on) 46'
CM	22	Alberto Garcia Aspe	(substituted on) 12'
Manager:
(Argentina) Cesar Luis Menotti

5 December 1992

Honduras	2–1	Costa Rica
Flores 15'; Obando 51'		Ramírez 73'

Estadio Tiburcio Carías Andino, Tegucigalpa
Attendance: 5
Referee: Mike Seifert (Canada)

6 December 1992

Mexico	11–0	Saint Vincent and the Grenadines
Uribe 5', 38', 88'; Hermosillo 14', 23', 76', 80'; Bernal 30', 56', 71'; Zague 44' (pen.)

Estadio Azul, Mexico City
Attendance: 20,000
Referee: Jose Antonio Gómez Santos (El Salvador)
Team details

Mexico	Saint Vincent and the Grenadines

GK	1	Eduardo Fernandez
RB	2	Claudio Suarez
CB	3	Ramirez Perales
CB	4	Roberto Ruiz Esparza
RM	5	Marcelino Bernal
CM	6	Miguel España	(substituted off) 46'
CM	8	Alberto Garcia Aspe
LM	10	Missael Espinoza	(substituted off) 46'
RF	11	Francisco Uribe
CF	17	Carlos Hermosillo
LF	9	Luis Roberto Alves
Substitutes:
CM	16	Jaime Ordiales	(substituted on) 46'
LM	22	Alberto Coyote	(substituted on) 46'
Manager:
(Argentina) Cesar Luis Menotti

GK	1	Fitzgerald King		(substituted off) 5'
RB	2	Keith Ollivierre
CB	3	Randy Patrick
CB	4	Dexter Browne
LB	6	Alphonsus Brown
RM	5	Christopher Harry
CM	7	Curtis Joseph
LM	8	Verbin Sutherland
RF	10	Rodney Jack	(substituted off) 46'
CF	9	Derek Dupont
LF	11	Calvert Richards	(substituted off) 68'
Substitutes:
LM	21	Garfield Cupid	(substituted on) 46'
CM	16	Kendall Velox	(substituted on) 68'
Manager:
(Brazil) Jorge Ramos

13 December 1992

Costa Rica	5–0	Saint Vincent and the Grenadines
Astúa 6', 50', 70'; Medford 43'; Arnáez 73'

Antiguo Estadio Nacional de Costa Rica, San José
Attendance: 12,000
Referee: Brian Hall (United States)

13 December 1992

Honduras	1–1	Mexico
Suazo 49'		Uribe 57'

Estadio Tiburcio Carías Andino, Tegucigalpa
Attendance: 25,000
Referee: Jack D'Aquila (United States)
Team details

Honduras	Mexico

GK	1	Wilmer Cruz
RB	2	Juan Castro
CB	3	Rudy Williams
CB	4	Arnold Cruz
LB	7	Luis Calix
RM	5	Gilberto Yearwood	(yellow card) 18'
CM	6	Cesar Obando
LM	9	Mauricio Funez	(yellow card) 34'
RF	8	Eugenio Dolmo Flores
CF	10	Raul Sambula
LF	11	Nicolas Suazo
Substitutes:
Manager:
(Uruguay) José Estanislao Malinowski

GK	1	Jorge Campos	(yellow card) 33'
RB	4	Ignacio Ambriz
CB	2	Claudio Suarez
LB	3	Ramirez Perales
RM	5	Marcelino Bernal		(substituted off) 75'
CM	6	Miguel España
CM	8	Alberto Garcia Aspe
LM	7	Missael Espinoza
RF	10	Francisco Uribe	(yellow card) 57'
RF	11	Luis Garcia
LF	9	Luis Roberto Alves	(substituted off) 71'
Substitutes:
MF	21	Alberto Coyote		(substituted on) 71'
DF	22	Jaime Ordiales		(substituted on) 75'
Manager:
(Argentina) Cesar Luis Menotti

=== Group B ===
Rank	Team	Pts	Pld	W	D	L	GF	GA	GD
1	El Salvador	9	6	4	1	1	12	6	+6
2	Canada	7	6	2	3	1	9	7	+2
3	Jamaica	4	6	1	2	3	6	9	−3
4	Bermuda	4	6	1	2	3	7	12	−5

El Salvador and Canada advanced to the final round.

18 October 1992

Jamaica	1–1	Canada
Wright 78'		Mitchell 85'

Independence Park, Kingston
Attendance: 17,000
Referee: Ramesh Ramdhan (Trinidad and Tobago)

18 October 1992

Bermuda	1–0	El Salvador
Lightbourne 77'

Bermuda National Stadium, Hamilton
Attendance: 4,000
Referee: Miguel Salas Castillo (Mexico)

25 October 1992

El Salvador	1–1	Canada
González 32'		Miller 86'

Estadio Cuscatlán, San Salvador
Attendance: 16,342
Referee: Victor Hugo Rodriguez Ugaldo (Costa Rica)

25 October 1992

Bermuda	1–1	Jamaica
Jennings 51'		Davis 73'

Bermuda National Stadium, Hamilton
Attendance: 4,500
Referee: Ali Black (Saint Lucia)

1 November 1992

Canada	1–0	Jamaica
Mitchell 53'

Varsity Stadium, Toronto
Attendance: 8,131
Referee: Franklin Morales Trujillo (Guatemala)

1 November 1992

El Salvador	4–1	Bermuda
Palacios 22'; González 44'; Cienfuegos 52'; Rivera 56'		Goater 80'

Estadio Cuscatlán, San Salvador
Attendance: 21,300
Referee: Jose Luis Fuentes (Honduras)

8 November 1992

Canada	2–3	El Salvador
Miller 13'; Mitchell 71'		Rivera 44'; Ulloa 52', 89'

Swangard Stadium, Burnaby
Attendance: 6,278
Referee: Carlos Castellanos Orendain (Mexico)

8 November 1992

Jamaica	3–2	Bermuda
Wright 5', 75' (pen.); Reid 8'		Paynter 66'; Goater 68'

Independence Park, Kingston
Attendance: 10,000
Referee: Ronald Gutierrez Castro (Costa Rica)

15 November 1992

Canada	4–2	Bermuda
Bunbury 9', 14', 35'; Aunger 86'		Goater 72'; Swan 76'

Swangard Stadium, Burnaby
Attendance: 4,093
Referee: Leon Padro Borja (Mexico)

22 November 1992

Jamaica	0–2	El Salvador
		Meléndez 8', 85'

Independence Park, Kingston
Attendance: 15,000
Referee: Berny Ulloa Morera (Costa Rica)

6 December 1992

Bermuda	0–0	Canada

Bermuda National Stadium, Hamilton
Attendance: 1,200
Referee: Ed Cummings (United States)

6 December 1992

El Salvador	2–1	Jamaica
Meléndez 21'; Díaz Arce 64'		Davis 35'

Estadio Cuscatlán, San Salvador
Attendance: 36,625
Referee: Fredy Rolando Burgos Escobar (Guatemala)

== Final round ==
Rank	Team	Pts	Pld	W	D	L	GF	GA	GD	Qualification
1	Mexico	10	6	5	0	1	17	5	+12	1994 FIFA World Cup
2	Canada	7	6	3	1	2	10	10	0	Inter-confederation play-offs
3	El Salvador	4	6	2	0	4	6	11	−5	
4	Honduras	3	6	1	1	4	7	14	−7	

4 April 1993

El Salvador	2–1	Mexico
Borja 41' (pen.); Iraheta 77'		Garcia Aspe 75'

Estadio Cuscatlán, San Salvador
Attendance: 40,000
Referee: Armando Perez Hoyos (Colombia)
Team details

El Salvador	Mexico

GK	1	Carlos Rivera
RB	2	Fernando Lazo
CB	3	Giovanni Trigueros
CB	4	Jorge Abrego
CB	6	Leonel Carcamo
LB	5	William Osorio
RM	7	Carlos Castro	(yellow card) 84'
CM	8	Guillermo Rivera		(substituted off) 46'
LM	11	Mauricio Cienfuegos		(substituted off) 74'
CF	9	Raul Diaz Arce
LF	10	Mágico González
Substitutes:
LM	21	Milton Melendez		(substituted on) 46'
CM	16	William Renderos		(substituted on) 74'
Manager:
(Brazil) Jorge Vieira

GK	1	Jorge Campos
RB	5	Miguel Herrera
CB	2	Claudio Suarez
CB	3	Abraham Nava		(substituted off) 39'
LB	7	Ramon Ramirez	(yellow card) 83'
RM	4	Ignacio Ambriz
CM	6	Miguel España	(yellow card) 6'
CM	8	Alberto Garcia Aspe
LM	10	Benjamin Galindo
RF	11	Francisco Uribe		(substituted off) 56'
LF	9	Hugo Sanchez
Substitutes:
CF	16	Francisco Javier Cruz		(substituted on) 39'
RM	22	David Patiño		(substituted on) 56'
Manager:
Miguel Mejia Baron

4 April 1993

Honduras	2–2	Canada
Smith 41' (pen.); Obando 89' (pen.)		Catliff 34' (pen.); Bunbury 68'

Estadio Tiburcio Carías Andino, Tegucigalpa
Attendance: 30,000
Referee: Noel Smith (Jamaica)

11 April 1993

Mexico	3–0	Honduras
Flores 7'; Sanchez 76' (pen.); Ambríz 89'

Estadio Azteca, Mexico City
Attendance: 120,000
Referee: Ronald Gutierrez Castro (Costa Rica)
Team details

Mexico	Honduras

GK	1	Jorge Campos
RB	5	Miguel Herrera	(red card) 27'
CB	2	Claudio Suarez	(yellow card) 85'
CB	3	Ramirez Perales
LB	7	Ramon Ramirez
RM	10	David Patiño	(substituted off) 29'
CM	4	Ignacio Ambriz
LM	8	Alberto Garcia Aspe
RF	6	Luis Flores	(yellow card) 33'	(substituted off) 89'
CF	11	Luis Garcia
LF	9	Hugo Sanchez
Substitutes:
RB	21	Raul Gutierrez		(substituted on) 29'
LM	22	Benjamin Galindo		(substituted on) 89'
Manager:
Miguel Mejia Baron

GK	1	Belarmino Rivera
RB	2	Juan Castro	(yellow card) 85'
CB	3	Mauricio Funez	(yellow card) 34'	(substituted off) 40'
CB	4	Raul Sambula	(yellow card) 53'
LB	5	José Fernandez
RM	7	Arnold Cruz	(yellow card) 76'
CM	6	Gilberto Yearwood	(yellow card) 18'
CM	8	Rodolfo Richardson Smith
LM	11	Luis Calix
RF	9	Eugenio Dolmo Flores	(yellow card) 22'
LF	10	Nicolas Suazo		(substituted off) 57'
Substitutes:
CF	20	Cesar Obando		(substituted on) 40'
LF	10	Juan Flores		(substituted on) 57'
Manager:
(Uruguay) Estanislao Malinowski

11 April 1993

Canada	2–0	El Salvador
Bunbury 25'; Catliff 33'

Swangard Stadium, Burnaby
Attendance: 6,968
Referee: Ramesh Ramdhan (Trinidad and Tobago)

18 April 1993

Canada	3–1	Honduras
Mobilio 52'; Bautista 62' (o.g.); Catliff 66' (pen.)		Pineda 17'

Swangard Stadium, Burnaby
Attendance: 6,868
Referee: Nelson Rodriguez Fernandez (Venezuela)

18 April 1993

Mexico	3–1	El Salvador
Ambríz 2'; Garcia 55'; Ramírez 63'		Ulloa 86'

Estadio Azteca, Mexico City
Attendance: 120,000
Referee: Mario Efrain Escobar López (Guatemala)
Team details

Mexico	El Salvador

GK	1	Jorge Campos
RB	3	Raúl Gutierrez
CB	4	Ignacio Ambriz
CB	2	Ramirez Perales
LB	7	Ramon Ramirez
RM	5	David Patiño	(substituted off) 76'
CM	6	Miguel España
LM	8	Alberto Garcia Aspe
RF	10	Luis Flores
CF	11	Luis Garcia
LF	9	Ricardo Pelaez	(substituted off) 79'
Substitutes:
CF	16	Francisco Javier Cruz	(substituted on) 76'
LF	19	Luis Miguel Salvador	(substituted on) 79'
Manager:
Miguel Mejia Baron

GK	1	Raúl García
RB	2	Fernando Lazo	(yellow card) 87'
CB	3	Mario Mayen Meza
CB	4	Giovanni Trigueros		(substituted off) 46'
CB	6	Jorge Abrego	(yellow card) 72'
LB	5	William Osorio
RM	7	Carlos Castro
CM	11	Milton Melendez	(yellow card) 81'
CM	8	Guillermo Rivera		(substituted off) 74'
LM	10	Mauricio Cienfuegos
CF	9	Raul Diaz Arce	(yellow card) 66'
Substitutes:
CB	18	Fredy Orellana		(substituted on) 46'
LF	21	Oscar Ulloa		(substituted on) 74'
Manager:
(Brazil) Jorge Vieira

25 April 1993

Mexico	4–0	Canada
Ramírez 20', 34'; Flores 53'; Garcia Aspe 68'

Estadio Azteca, Mexico City
Attendance: 103,000
Referee: Berny Ulloa Morera (Costa Rica)
Team details

Mexico	Canada

GK	1	Jorge Campos
RB	21	Raúl Gutierrez	(substituted off) 85'
CB	2	Claudio Suarez
CB	3	Ramirez Perales
LB	7	Ramon Ramirez
RM	5	David Patiño
CM	4	Ignacio Ambriz
LM	8	Alberto Garcia Aspe
RF	10	Luis Flores
CF	11	Luis Garcia	(substituted off) 72'
LF	9	Hugo Sanchez
Substitutes:
CM	16	Miguel España	(substituted on) 85'
LF	19	Luis Miguel Salvador	(substituted on) 72'
Manager:
Miguel Mejia Baron

GK	1	Craig Forrest
RB	2	Colin Miller
CB	3	Randy Samuel
CB	4	Frank Yallop
CB	6	David Norman
LB	5	Mike Sweeney
RM	7	Nick Dasovic
CM	11	John Catliff
CM	8	Alex Bunbury
LM	10	Domenic Mobilio		(substituted off) 60'
CF	9	Carl Valentine		(substituted off) 40'
Substitutes:
CF	18	Paul Peschisolido	(yellow card) 43'	(substituted on) 40'
LF	21	Marco Rizi		(substituted on) 60'
Manager:
Bob Lenarduzzi

25 April 1993

Honduras	2–0	El Salvador
Bennett 28', 63'

Estadio Tiburcio Carías Andino, Tegucigalpa
Attendance: 25,000
Referee: Joaquin Urio Velazquez (Spain)

2 May 1993

Honduras	1–4	Mexico
Flores 56'		Garcia Aspe 2'; Flores 44'; Garcia 49'; Smith 89' (o.g.)

Estadio Tiburcio Carías Andino, Tegucigalpa
Attendance: 37,500
Referee: Márcio Rezende de Freitas (Brazil)
Team details

Honduras	Mexico

GK	1	Wilmer Cruz
RB	2	Marco Antonio Anariba	(yellow card) 85'
CB	3	Mauricio Funez	(red card) 71'
CB	4	Tomás Róchez	(yellow card) 7'
LB	5	José Fernandez	(red card) 90'
RM	7	Arnold Cruz
CM	6	Gilberto Yearwood	(yellow card) 33'
LM	8	Rodolfo Richardson Smith
RF	11	Eduardo Bennett		(substituted off) 20'
CF	9	Eugenio Dolmo Flores
LF	10	Nicolas Suazo		(substituted off) 70'
Substitutes:
CM	20	Raúl Sambulá		(substituted on) 70'
LF	10	Juan Flores		(substituted on) 20'
Manager:
(Uruguay) Estanislao Malinowski

GK	1	Jorge Campos
RB	4	Ignacio Ambriz
CB	2	Claudio Suarez	(yellow card) 73'
CB	3	Ramirez Perales
LB	7	Ramon Ramirez	(yellow card) 7'
RM	10	David Patiño		(substituted off) 68'
CM	5	Miguel España	(yellow card) 57'
LM	8	Alberto Garcia Aspe	(red card) 71'
RF	6	Luis Flores	(yellow card) 33'
CF	11	Luis Garcia	(yellow card) 59'
LF	9	Hugo Sanchez
Substitutes:
RB	21	Raul Gutierrez		(substituted on) 68'
Manager:
Miguel Mejia Baron

2 May 1993

El Salvador	1–2	Canada
González 58'		Catliff 27'; Mobilio 60'

Estadio Cuscatlán, San Salvador
Attendance: 25,000
Referee: Arlington Success (Antigua and Barbuda)

9 May 1993

Canada	1–2	Mexico
Bunbury 17'		Sanchez 36'; Cruz 84'

Varsity Stadium, Toronto
Attendance: 12,000
Referee: Hellmut Krug (Germany)
Team details

Canada	Mexico

GK	1	Craig Forrest
RB	2	Randy Samuel	(yellow card) 40'
CB	3	Mark Watson
CB	4	Frank Yallop	(yellow card) 58'
LB	5	Geoff Aunger		(substituted off) 46'
RM	7	Lyndon Hooper
CM	6	David Norman		(substituted off) 62'
LM	8	Mike Sweeney
RF	10	John Catliff
CF	9	Dale Mitchell
LF	11	Alex Bunbury
Substitutes:
LM	10	Domenic Mobilio		(substituted off) 62'
CF	18	Paul Peschisolido	(yellow card) 49'	(substituted on) 46'
RB	2	Colin Miller
RM	7	Nick Dasovic
CF	9	Carl Valentine
LF	21	Marco Rizi
Manager:
Bob Lenarduzzi

GK	1	Jorge Campos
RB	2	Miguel Herrera	(yellow card) 49'
CB	3	Ramirez Perales	(yellow card) 50'
CB	4	Claudio Suarez	(yellow card) 27'
LB	7	Ramon Ramirez
RM	5	David Patiño
CM	6	Miguel España
LM	8	Ignacio Ambriz	(yellow card) 52'
RF	10	Luis Flores
CF	11	Luis Miguel Salvador		(substituted off) 69'
LF	9	Hugo Sanchez
Substitutes:
CF	16	Francisco Javier Cruz	(substituted on) 69'	(substituted off) 86'
CB	19	Abraham Nava		(substituted on) 86'
Manager:
Miguel Mejia Baron

9 May 1993

El Salvador	2–1	Honduras
Díaz Arce 1'; Ulloa 32'		Anariba 77' (pen.)

Estadio Cuscatlán, San Salvador
Attendance: 3,500
Referee: Arturo Angeles (United States)

== Inter-confederation play-offs ==
Team 1	Agg.	Team 2	1st leg	2nd leg
Canada	3–3 (1–4 p)	Australia	2–1	1–2 (a.e.t.)

== Qualified teams ==
The following two teams from CONCACAF qualified for the final tournament.

Team	Qualified as	Qualified on	Previous appearances in FIFA World Cup^{1}
United States	Hosts	4 July 1988	4 (1930, 1934, 1950, 1990)
Mexico	Final round winners	9 May 1993	9 (1930, 1950, 1954, 1958, 1962, 1966, 1970, 1978, 1986)

^{1} Bold indicates champions for that year. Italic indicates hosts for that year.

== Goalscorers ==
7 goals

- (Bermuda) Shaun Goater
- (Mexico) Francisco Uribe

6 goals

- (Canada) Alex Bunbury
- (El Salvador) Mágico González
- (El Salvador) Óscar Ulloa

5 goals

- (Honduras) Juan Flores Madariaga
- (Honduras) César Obando

4 goals

- (Canada) John Catliff
- (Costa Rica) Javier Astua
- (El Salvador) Carlos Castro Borja
- (Jamaica) Hector Wright
- (Mexico) Luis García Postigo
- (Mexico) Carlos Hermosillo

3 goals

- (Antigua and Barbuda) Derrick Edwards
- (Canada) Dale Mitchell
- (Canada) Domenic Mobilio
- (El Salvador) Milton Meléndez
- (Honduras) Eduardo Bennett
- (Honduras) Richardson Smith
- (Honduras) Nicolás Suazo
- (Jamaica) Paul Davis
- (Mexico) Marcelino Bernal
- (Mexico) Luis Flores
- (Mexico) Alberto Garcia Aspe
- (Mexico) Ramón Ramírez

2 goals

- (Bermuda) Kentoine Jennings
- (Canada) Colin Miller
- (Costa Rica) Juan Carlos Arguedas
- (Costa Rica) Luis Diego Arnáez
- (Costa Rica) Austin Berry
- (Costa Rica) Óscar Ramírez
- (Costa Rica) Richard Smith
- (Dominican Republic) Dinardo Rodríguez
- (El Salvador) Mauricio Cienfuegos
- (El Salvador) Raúl Díaz Arce
- (El Salvador) Guillermo Rivera
- (Haiti) Charlie Eliezar
- (Mexico) Ignacio Ambríz
- (Mexico) Hugo Sanchez
- (Mexico) Claudio Suárez
- (Mexico) José Manuel de la Torre
- (Mexico) Zague
- (Panama) Víctor René Mendieta Ocampo
- (Saint Lucia) Earl Jean
- (Saint Vincent and the Grenadines) Curtis Joseph
- (Trinidad and Tobago) Hutson Charles

1 goal

- (Antigua and Barbuda) Quentin Clarke
- (Antigua and Barbuda) Luke Ivor
- (Barbados) Tyrone White
- (Bermuda) Paul Cann
- (Bermuda) Kyle Lightbourne
- (Bermuda) Neil Paynter
- (Bermuda) Sammy Swan
- (Bermuda) Kenneth Thompson
- (Canada) Geoff Aunger
- (Canada) Lyndon Hooper
- (Canada) Mark Watson
- (Costa Rica) Rónald González Brenes
- (Costa Rica) Hernán Medford
- (El Salvador) Miguel Estrada
- (El Salvador) William Renderos Iraheta
- (El Salvador) Julio Palacios Lozano
- (Guyana) Kevin Archer
- (Guyana) Antonhy Stanton
- (Honduras) Marco Antonio Anariba
- (Honduras) Eugenio Dolmo Flores
- (Honduras) Alex Pineda Chacón
- (Honduras) Antonio Zelaya
- (Jamaica) Winston Anglin
- (Jamaica) Ricardo Hyde
- (Jamaica) Peter Isaacs
- (Jamaica) Roderick Reid
- (Jamaica) Linnal Wilson
- (Mexico) Francisco Javier Cruz
- (Netherlands Antilles) Giovanni Regales
- (Nicaragua) César Rostrán
- (Puerto Rico) Ramiro Borja
- (Puerto Rico) Andre Espinoza
- (Puerto Rico) Marcos Lugris
- (Puerto Rico) Franco Paonessa
- (Saint Vincent and the Grenadines) Alphonsus Brown
- (Saint Vincent and the Grenadines) Francis Dupont
- (Saint Vincent and the Grenadines) Rodney Jack
- (Suriname) Joseph Francis
- (Suriname) Eric Godlieb
- (Suriname) Marciano Leyman
- (Suriname) Stanley Samson
- (Trinidad and Tobago) Brian Haynes
- (Trinidad and Tobago) Marvin Faustin
- (Trinidad and Tobago) Kerry Jamerson
- (Trinidad and Tobago) Russell Latapy
- (Trinidad and Tobago) Leonson Lewis

1 own goal

- (Canada) Nick Dasovic (playing against Australia)
- (Honduras) Dangelo Bautista (playing against Canada)
- (Honduras) Richardson Smith (playing against Mexico)
