= 1993 UNCAF Nations Cup squads =

Below are the rosters for the 1993 UNCAF Nations Cup tournament in Tegucigalpa, Honduras, from March 5 to March 9, 1993.

== Costa Rica ==
Head coach: (Costa Rica) Juan José Gámez

No.	Pos.	Player	Date of birth (age)	Caps	Club
1	GK	Erick Lonnis	9 September 1965 (aged 27)		(Costa Rica) Carmelita
13	GK	Paul Mayorga	21 September 1970 (aged 22)		(Costa Rica) Alajuelense
2	DF	Alexánder Gómez	18 February 1971 (aged 22)		(Costa Rica) Cartaginés
3	DF	Rónald González	8 August 1970 (aged 22)		(Costa Rica) Saprissa
4	DF	Edwin Barquero	23 October 1968 (aged 24)		(Costa Rica) Herediano
6	DF	Maximilian Peynado	8 September 1970 (aged 22)		(Costa Rica) Turrialba
15	DF	Reynaldo Parks	4 December 1974 (aged 18)		(Costa Rica) Limonense
19	DF	Rándall Row	21 April 1971 (aged 21)		(Costa Rica) Turrialba
5	MF	Germán Rodríguez Araya	12 December 1964 (aged 28)		(Costa Rica) Herediano
8	MF	Floyd Guthrie	16 March 1966 (aged 26)		(Costa Rica) Turrialba
9	MF	Rolando Velásquez	20 December 1970 (aged 22)		(Costa Rica) Puntarenas
10	MF	Kenneth Paniagua	24 June 1971 (aged 21)		(Costa Rica) Herediano
12	MF	Juan Carlos Arguedas	3 May 1970 (aged 22)		(Costa Rica) Alajuelense
7	FW	Harold López			(Costa Rica) Alajuelense
11	FW	Rolando Fonseca	6 June 1974 (aged 18)		(Costa Rica) Saprissa
14	FW	Rónald Gómez	24 January 1975 (aged 18)		(Costa Rica) Carmelita
16	FW	Javier Astúa	6 November 1968 (aged 24)		(Costa Rica) Puntarenas
18	FW	Michael Myers	1 April 1968 (aged 24)		(Costa Rica) Turrialba

Players who did not travel with the delegation:

No.	Pos.	Player	Date of birth (age)	Caps	Club
22	GK	Fernando Patterson	11 February 1970 (aged 23)		(Costa Rica) Turrialba
17	DF	Jose Jaikel	3 April 1966 (aged 26)		(Costa Rica) Saprissa
24	DF	Erick Mata	29 November 1967 (aged 25)		(Costa Rica) Turrialba
20	MF	Giancarlo Morera	16 September 1968 (aged 24)		(Costa Rica) Carmelita
	MF	José Alberto Solano	29 February 1968 (aged 25)		(Costa Rica) Turrialba
21	FW	Heriberto Quirós	26 July 1972 (aged 20)		(Costa Rica) Cartaginés

== El Salvador ==
Head coach: (Brazil) Jorge Vieira

No.	Pos.	Player	Date of birth (age)	Caps	Club
1	GK	Raúl García	13 September 1962 (aged 30)		(El Salvador) Águila
18	GK	Carlos Eduardo Rivera	4 January 1959 (aged 34)		(El Salvador) Luis Ángel Firpo
2	DF	Giovanni Trigueros	8 December 1966 (aged 26)		(El Salvador) Luis Ángel Firpo
3	DF	Mario Mayén Meza	19 May 1968 (aged 24)		(El Salvador) Alianza
4	DF	William Osorio	13 April 1971 (aged 21)		(El Salvador) FAS
6	DF	Jorge Ábrego	16 October 1964 (aged 28)		(El Salvador) FAS
16	DF	Leonel Cárcamo	5 May 1965 (aged 27)		(El Salvador) Luis Ángel Firpo
5	MF	Milton Meléndez	8 March 1967 (aged 25)		(El Salvador) Alianza
11	MF	Carlos Castro Borja	1 August 1967 (aged 25)		(El Salvador) Atlético Marte
13	MF	José Guillermo Rivera	25 November 1969 (aged 23)		(El Salvador) FAS
7	FW	Óscar Ulloa	16 September 1963 (aged 29)		(El Salvador) Alianza
9	FW	Fredy Orellana	10 May 1954 (aged 38)		(El Salvador) FAS
17	FW	Raúl Díaz Arce	1 February 1970 (aged 23)		(El Salvador) Luis Ángel Firpo
19	FW	William Renderos	3 October 1971 (aged 21)		(El Salvador) FAS
20	FW	Julio Palacios	9 August 1961 (aged 31)		(El Salvador) Alianza

Players who did not travel with the delegation:

No.	Pos.	Player	Date of birth (age)	Caps	Club
12	GK	Nicolás Chávez	6 December 1959 (aged 33)		(El Salvador) FAS
15	DF	Fernando Navarrete Sermeño	7 July 1968 (aged 24)		(El Salvador) Tiburones
23	DF	Carlos Mario Joya	28 March 1973 (aged 19)		(El Salvador) Luis Ángel Firpo
8	MF	Salvador Arturo Correas	22 November 1960 (aged 32)		(United States) Los Angeles Salsa
14	MF	Mauricio Cienfuegos	12 February 1968 (aged 25)		(El Salvador) Luis Ángel Firpo
21	MF	Hector Alejandro Rosales	9 August 1961 (aged 31)		(El Salvador) Águila
24	MF	Ricardo Colorado	12 February 1972 (aged 21)		(El Salvador) Tiburones
10	FW	Julio Amilcar Rosales	9 August 1961 (aged 31)		(El Salvador) Alianza

== Honduras ==
Head coach: (Uruguay) Estanislao Malinowski

No.	Pos.	Player	Date of birth (age)	Caps	Club
1	GK	Wilmer Cruz	18 December 1965 (aged 27)		(Honduras) Real España
12	GK	Belarmino Rivera	5 February 1956 (aged 37)		(Honduras) Olimpia
2	DF	Arnold Cruz	22 December 1970 (aged 22)		(Honduras) Olimpia
3	DF	Juan Ramón Castro	31 August 1965 (aged 27)		(Honduras) Real España
4	DF	Marco Antonio Anariba	18 February 1968 (aged 25)		(Honduras) Real España
7	MF	Alex Pineda Chacón	31 December 1969 (aged 23)		(Honduras) Olimpia
11	MF	Gilberto Yearwood	15 March 1956 (aged 36)		(Honduras) Olimpia
14	MF	Mauricio Fúnez	10 March 1959 (aged 33)		(Honduras) Real España
15	MF	Tomás Róchez	1 October 1964 (aged 28)		(Honduras) Petrotela
16	MF	Luis Enrique Cálix	30 August 1965 (aged 27)		(Honduras) Petrotela
8	FW	Nicolás Suazo	9 January 1965 (aged 28)		(Honduras) Marathón
9	FW	Eugenio Dolmo Flores	31 July 1965 (aged 27)		(Honduras) Petrotela

Players who did not travel with the delegation:

No.	Pos.	Player	Date of birth (age)	Caps	Club
17	GK	Dángelo Dantino Bautista	6 September 1967 (aged 25)		(Honduras) Marathón
5	DF	Hernáin Arzú Guity	13 October 1967 (aged 25)		(Honduras) Motagua
19	DF	Mateo Benedic Ávila	16 December 1970 (aged 22)		(Honduras) Platense
23	DF	Victor Orlando Garay			(Honduras) Petrotela
6	MF	Alexis Duarte Escoto	20 March 1974 (aged 18)		(Honduras) Petrotela
10	MF	Luis Orlando Vallejo	24 June 1968 (aged 24)		(Honduras) Real España
18	MF	José Luis Aguirre	12 August 1969 (aged 23)		(Honduras) Petrotela
20	MF	Geovany Gayle Alarcón	5 December 1974 (aged 18)		(Honduras) Petrotela
22	MF	Rodolfo Richardson Smith	24 February 1963 (aged 30)		(Mexico) Leones Negros UdeG
24	MF	Rolin Castillo	13 May 1966 (aged 26)		(Honduras) Real Sociedad

== Panama ==
Head coach: (Colombia) Saúl Suárez

No.	Pos.	Player	Date of birth (age)	Caps	Club
1	GK	Ricardo James	7 May 1966 (aged 26)		(Honduras) Platense
2	DF	Rogelio Clarke	9 February 1964 (aged 29)		(Panama) Árabe Unido
3	DF	José Alfredo Poyatos	27 November 1964 (aged 28)		(Panama) Tauro
4	DF	Fernando Bolívar	17 February 1967 (aged 26)		(Panama) Plaza Amador
6	DF	Jorge Méndez	5 March 1959 (aged 34)		(Panama) Plaza Amador
13	DF	Franklin Delgado	18 February 1966 (aged 27)		(El Salvador) Tiburones
15	DF	Noel Gutiérrez	7 April 1967 (aged 25)		(Panama) San Francisco
19	DF	Agustín Castillo	8 July 1971 (aged 21)		(Panama) San Francisco
5	MF	Neftalí Díaz	15 December 1971 (aged 21)		(Panama) Euro Kickers
8	MF	Eric Medina Bernal	23 June 1968 (aged 24)		(Panama) Árabe Unido
10	MF	Jesús Julio	2 December 1962 (aged 30)		(Panama) Plaza Amador
16	MF	Rolando Botello	21 December 1968 (aged 24)		(Panama) Euro Kickers
17	MF	Frank Lozada	6 October 1965 (aged 27)		(Costa Rica) Pérez Zeledón
7	FW	Armando Dely Valdés	5 January 1964 (aged 29)		(Uruguay) Liverpool
9	FW	Pércival Piggott	23 November 1966 (aged 26)		(Panama) Tauro
11	FW	Ruben Elias Guevara	27 January 1964 (aged 29)		(Peru) León de Huánuco
14	FW	Erick Ortega	27 February 1968 (aged 25)		(El Salvador) Fuerte San Francisco
18	FW	Victor René Mendieta	16 June 1961 (aged 31)		(Mexico) Leones Negros UdeG
20	FW	José Ernesto Ariza	16 January 1966 (aged 27)		(Panama) Plaza Amador
23	FW	Joseph Cox	10 December 1966 (aged 26)		(Panama) Plaza Amador

Players who did not travel with the delegation:

No.	Pos.	Player	Date of birth (age)	Caps	Club
12	GK	Martin Leonel Tuñon	7 July 1972 (aged 20)		(Panama) Árabe Unido
22	GK	Carlos Bustamante	8 November 1962 (aged 30)		(Panama) Tauro
24	FW	José Ardines	7 August 1968 (aged 24)		(Panama) Euro Kickers
