= 1991 UNCAF Nations Cup squads =

Below are the rosters for the UNCAF Nations Cup 1991 tournament in San José, Costa Rica, from May 26 to June 2, 1991.

== Costa Rica ==
Head coach: (Costa Rica) Rolando Villalobos

| No. | Pos. | Player | Date of birth (age) | Caps | Club |
|---|---|---|---|---|---|
| 1 | GK | Hermidio Barrantes | 2 September 1964 (aged 26) | | (Costa Rica) Puntarenas |
| 12 | GK | Pedro Cubillo | 29 January 1969 (aged 22) | | (Costa Rica) Guanacasteca |
| 17 | GK | José Rojas | 30 April 1965 (aged 26) | | (Costa Rica) Herediano |
| 2 | DF | Vladimir Quesada | 12 May 1966 (aged 25) | | (Costa Rica) Saprissa |
| 3 | DF | Róger Flores | 26 May 1959 (aged 32) | | (Costa Rica) Saprissa |
| 4 | DF | Mauricio Montero | 19 October 1963 (aged 27) | | (Costa Rica) Alajuelense |
| 6 | DF | Héctor Marchena | 4 January 1965 (aged 26) | | (Costa Rica) Cartaginés |
| 14 | DF | Edwin Salazar Chavarría | 7 August 1962 (aged 28) | | (Costa Rica) Uruguay de Coronado |
| 15 | MF | Floyd Guthrie | 14 March 1966 (aged 25) | | (Costa Rica) Turrialba |
| 5 | MF | Luis Diego Arnáez | 5 November 1967 (aged 23) | | (Costa Rica) Puntarenas |
| 8 | MF | Róger Gómez | 7 February 1965 (aged 26) | | (Costa Rica) Cartaginés |
| 10 | MF | Roy Myers | 13 April 1969 (aged 22) | | (Costa Rica) Limonense |
| 19 | MF | Oscar Ramírez | 8 December 1964 (aged 26) | | (Costa Rica) Alajuelense |
| 16 | MF | Carlos Velásquez Torres | 14 May 1961 (aged 30) | | (Costa Rica) Alajuelense |
| 18 | MF | Eusebio Montero | 12 January 1971 (aged 20) | | (Costa Rica) Alajuelense |
| 7 | FW | Claudio Jara | 6 May 1959 (aged 32) | | (Costa Rica) Herediano |
| 9 | FW | Leonidas Flores | 24 January 1965 (aged 26) | | (Canada) Montreal Supra |
| 11 | FW | Javier Wanchope | 10 August 1968 (aged 22) | | (Costa Rica) Herediano |
| 13 | FW | Norman Gómez | 9 January 1965 (aged 26) | | (Costa Rica) Guanacasteca |
| 20 | FW | Benjamín Mayorga | 15 October 1966 (aged 24) | | (Costa Rica) Saprissa |

Players who did not travel with the delegation:

| No. | Pos. | Player | Date of birth (age) | Caps | Club |
|---|---|---|---|---|---|
| 21 | DF | Randall Row | 21 April 1971 (aged 20) | | (Costa Rica) Turrialba |
| 22 | DF | Sandro Alfaro | 1 January 1971 (aged 20) | | (Costa Rica) Puntarenas |
| 24 | DF | Roland Marin Duran | 2 November 1962 (aged 28) | | (Costa Rica) Cartaginés |
| 23 | MF | Álvaro Solano | 25 June 1961 (aged 29) | | (Costa Rica) Alajuelense |

== Guatemala ==
Head coach: (Guatemala) Haroldo Cordón

| No. | Pos. | Player | Date of birth (age) | Caps | Club |
|---|---|---|---|---|---|
| 1 | GK | Julio Cesar Englenton | 24 January 1962 (aged 29) | | (Guatemala) Galcasa |
| 12 | GK | Jorge Marotta | 23 September 1961 (aged 29) | | (Guatemala) Petapa |
| 2 | DF | Eduardo Acevedo | 8 June 1964 (aged 26) | 0 | (Guatemala) Comunicaciones |
| 3 | DF | Iván León | 3 March 1967 (aged 24) | 3 | (Guatemala) Comunicaciones |
| 4 | DF | Rocael Mazariegos | 8 January 1966 (aged 25) | | (Guatemala) Juventud Retalteca |
| 19 | DF | Erick Miranda | 17 December 1971 (aged 19) | 0 | (Guatemala) Amatitlán |
| 6 | DF | René Villavicencio | 26 October 1968 (aged 22) | 0 | (Guatemala) Xelajú |
| 15 | DF | Leonel Contreras | 23 February 1968 (aged 23) | | (Guatemala) Universidad Católica |
| 18 | DF | Ronald Remis | 15 October 1969 (aged 21) | | (Guatemala) Galcasa |
| 8 | MF | Jorge Rodas | 9 October 1971 (aged 19) | | (Guatemala) Municipal |
| 16 | MF | Juan Torres Juárez | 21 July 1968 (aged 22) | | (Guatemala) Amatitlán |
| 21 | MF | Edgar Valencia | 31 March 1971 (aged 20) | 0 | (Guatemala) Galcasa |
| 23 | MF | Jorge Vargas | 27 February 1967 (aged 24) | | (Guatemala) Jalapa |
| 7 | FW | Roderico Méndez | 5 November 1965 (aged 25) | | (Guatemala) Aurora |
| 9 | FW | Julio Rodas | 9 December 1966 (aged 24) | | (Guatemala) Municipal |
| 11 | FW | Edwin Westphal | 4 March 1966 (aged 25) | | (Guatemala) Izabal JC |

Players who did not travel with the delegation:

| No. | Pos. | Player | Date of birth (age) | Caps | Club |
|---|---|---|---|---|---|
| 22 | GK | Ricardo Jérez Hidalgo | 6 August 1956 (aged 34) | | (Guatemala) Comunicaciones |
| 13 | DF | David Stanley Gardiner | 16 December 1967 (aged 23) | | (Guatemala) Municipal |
| 10 | MF | Juan Manuel Flores | 16 May 1966 (aged 24) | | (Guatemala) Municipal |
| 14 | MF | Byron Pérez | 18 March 1959 (aged 32) | | (Guatemala) Suchitepéquez |
| 20 | MF | Eddy Patricio Suárez | 29 June 1960 (aged 30) | | (Guatemala) Antigua |
| 24 | MF | Guillermo Federico Seselvedo | 29 May 1963 (aged 27) | | (Guatemala) Halcones |
| 17 | FW | Carlos Emilio Castañeda | 4 April 1963 (aged 28) | | (Guatemala) Comunicaciones |

== Honduras ==
Head coach: (Brazil) Flavio Ortega

| No. | Pos. | Player | Date of birth (age) | Caps | Club |
|---|---|---|---|---|---|
| 1 | GK | Wilmer Cruz | 18 December 1965 (aged 25) | | (Honduras) Real España |
| 22 | GK | Belarmino Rivera | 5 February 1956 (aged 35) | | (Honduras) Olimpia |
| 2 | DF | Daniel Zapata | 22 March 1959 (aged 32) | | (Honduras) Olimpia |
| 6 | DF | Gilberto Yearwood | 15 March 1956 (aged 35) | | (Honduras) Olimpia |
| 3 | DF | Danilo Galindo | 4 March 1963 (aged 28) | | (Honduras) Olimpia |
| 6 | DF | Juan Castro | 31 August 1965 (aged 25) | | (Honduras) Real España |
| 19 | DF | Marco Anariba | 18 February 1968 (aged 23) | | (Honduras) Real España |
| 21 | DF | Pastor Martínez | 9 August 1964 (aged 26) | | (Honduras) Motagua |
| 7 | MF | Mauricio Fúnez | 10 March 1959 (aged 32) | | (Honduras) Real España |
| 8 | MF | Luis Cálix | 30 August 1965 (aged 25) | | (Mexico) Santos Laguna |
| 5 | MF | Juan Espinoza | 24 August 1958 (aged 32) | | (Honduras) Olimpia |
| 15 | MF | Gilberto Machado | 23 March 1962 (aged 29) | | (Honduras) Marathón |
| 20 | MF | Camilo Bonilla | 30 September 1971 (aged 19) | | (Honduras) Real España |
| 14 | MF | José Aguirre | 12 August 1969 (aged 21) | | (Honduras) Real España |
| 10 | MF | Nahamán González | 23 June 1967 (aged 23) | | (Honduras) Real España |
| 9 | FW | Nicolás Suazo | 9 January 1965 (aged 26) | | (Honduras) Marathón |
| 23 | FW | Ciro Castillo | 7 September 1965 (aged 25) | | (Honduras) Marathón |
| 18 | FW | Luis Vallejo | 24 June 1968 (aged 22) | | (Honduras) Real España |
| 11 | FW | César Obando | 26 October 1969 (aged 21) | | (Honduras) Motagua |

Players who did not travel with the delegation:

| No. | Pos. | Player | Date of birth (age) | Caps | Club |
|---|---|---|---|---|---|
| 12 | GK | Carlos Augusto Solis | 12 August 1965 (aged 25) | | (Honduras) Motagua |
| 17 | MF | Erick Fu Lanza | 17 June 1964 (aged 26) | | (Honduras) Olimpia |
| 24 | MF | Marco Adolfo Ordoñez | 22 October 1966 (aged 24) | | (Honduras) Hispano |
| 13 | FW | Eugenio Dolmo Flores | 31 March 1965 (aged 26) | | (Mexico) Santos Laguna |

== El Salvador ==
Head coach: (El Salvador) Oscar Benitez

| No. | Pos. | Player | Date of birth (age) | Caps | Club |
|---|---|---|---|---|---|
| 1 | GK | Misael Alfaro | 8 January 1971 (aged 20) | 0 | (El Salvador) Alianza |
| 2 | DF | Sergio Wilfredo Valencia | 22 March 1970 (aged 21) | 0 | (El Salvador) Águila |
| 3 | DF | Ernesto Valle | 1 June 1967 (aged 23) | | (El Salvador) Tiburones |
| 4 | DF | Mario Mayén Meza | 19 May 1968 (aged 23) | | (El Salvador) Alianza |
| 5 | DF | Salvador Salazar | 5 February 1968 (aged 23) | | (El Salvador) Tiburones |
| 6 | DF | Luis Lazo | 10 April 1972 (aged 19) | 0 | (El Salvador) Luis Angel Firpo |
| 8 | DF | William Osorio | 13 April 1971 (aged 20) | 0 | (El Salvador) FAS |
| 13 | DF | Jorge Rodríguez | 20 May 1971 (aged 20) | 0 | (El Salvador) Metapán |
| 10 | MF | Salomón Campos | 11 May 1960 (aged 31) | | (El Salvador) Tiburones |
| 15 | MF | Efraín Alas | 24 December 1964 (aged 26) | | (El Salvador) Alianza |
| 17 | MF | Guillermo Rivera | 25 November 1969 (aged 21) | | (El Salvador) FAS |
| 18 | MF | Douglas Vidal Jiménez | 8 April 1968 (aged 23) | | (El Salvador) ADET |
| 20 | MF | Luis Francisco Sandoval | 23 May 1966 (aged 25) | | (El Salvador) Luis Angel Firpo |
| 7 | FW | Jaime Murillo | 19 May 1970 (aged 21) | | (El Salvador) FAS |
| 9 | FW | Joaquín Canales | 11 April 1963 (aged 28) | | (El Salvador) Alianza |
| 11 | FW | Fredy Orellana | 10 May 1959 (aged 32) | | (El Salvador) Cojutepeque |
| 14 | FW | Sergio Álvarez | 13 December 1967 (aged 23) | | (El Salvador) FAS |
| 16 | FW | Baltazar Mirón | 9 June 1964 (aged 26) | | (El Salvador) Águila |
| 19 | FW | William Renderos Iraheta | 3 October 1971 (aged 19) | 0 | (El Salvador) FAS |
| 21 | FW | Amílcar González | 20 September 1958 (aged 32) | | (El Salvador) Tiburones |
| 22 | FW | Raúl Díaz Arce | 1 February 1970 (aged 21) | 0 | (El Salvador) Luis Ángel Firpo |
| 24 | FW | Óscar Antonio Ulloa | 16 September 1963 (aged 27) | | (El Salvador) Alianza |

Players who did not travel with the delegation:

| No. | Pos. | Player | Date of birth (age) | Caps | Club |
|---|---|---|---|---|---|
| 12 | GK | Carlos Eduardo Rivera | 4 January 1959 (aged 32) | 0 | (El Salvador) Luis Angel Firpo |
| 23 | GK | Luis Guevara Mora | 2 September 1961 (aged 29) | 0 | (Guatemala) Xelajú |
| 24 | FW | José María Rivas | 12 August 1958 (aged 32) | 0 | (El Salvador) Atlético Marte |
