= 1995 UNCAF Nations Cup squads =

Below are the rosters for the UNCAF Nations Cup 1995 tournament in San Salvador, El Salvador, from November 29 to December 10, 1995.

== Group A ==
=== Belize ===
Head coach: (Belize) Winston Michael

No.	Pos.	Player	Date of birth (age)	Caps	Club
1	GK	Carlos Slusher	28 January 1971 (aged 24)		(Belize)
2	DF	Pablo Madrid	9 November 1968 (aged 27)		(Belize) Sagitún FC
3	DF	Edwardo Swift	18 January 1969 (aged 26)		(Belize) San Pedro Dolphins
4	DF	Michael Kelly	1 March 1969 (aged 26)		(Belize) Belmopan Bandits
6	DF	Nelson Moss	27 January 1969 (aged 26)		(Belize) Griga United
14	DF	Martin Nolberto	22 June 1966 (aged 29)		Belize Defence Force
16	DF	Findlay Gladden	19 August 1972 (aged 23)		(Belize) Verdes
5	MF	Orlando Pinelo	24 July 1968 (aged 27)		(Belize) Acros FC
7	MF	Denmark Casey	22 November 1971 (aged 24)		(Belize) Verdes
10	MF	Edmond Pandy	24 May 1967 (aged 28)		(Belize) Juventus
14	MF	Deron Jones	5 October 1970 (aged 25)		(Belize) Verdes
18	MF	Jorge Garcia	2 September 1969 (aged 26)		(Belize) Verdes
20	MF	Clifford Usher	11 August 1971 (aged 24)		(Belize) La Victoria
9	FW	Norman Nuñez Pipesburgh	12 June 1971 (aged 24)		(Belize) Juventus
11	FW	Joseph West	18 August 1963 (aged 32)		Belize Defence Force
13	FW	David Rodriguez	6 March 1970 (aged 25)		(Belize) Benque FC
18	FW	David McCauley	4 May 1967 (aged 28)		(Belize) San Felipe Barcelona

Players who did not travel with the delegation:

No.	Pos.	Player	Date of birth (age)	Caps	Club
12	GK	Darren Hinds	17 September 1970 (aged 25)		(Belize)
19	GK	Dekmar Sutherland	30 January 1971 (aged 24)		(Belize)
22	DF	Óscar Valdez	1 January 1970 (aged 25)		(Belize)
24	DF	Norman Koto			(Belize)
15	MF	Deris Benavides	1 May 1976 (aged 19)		(Belize)
23	MF	Francisco Bardalez			(Belize)
8	FW	Rogelio Barahona	29 April 1966 (aged 29)		(Belize)
21	FW	Marcelino Tun	8 August 1975 (aged 20)		(Belize)

=== Costa Rica ===
Head coach: Toribio Rojas

No.	Pos.	Player	Date of birth (age)	Caps	Club
1	GK	Erick Lonnis	9 September 1965 (aged 30)		(Costa Rica) Saprissa
18	GK	Marvin Solórzano			(Costa Rica) Cartaginés
2	DF	Austín Berry	5 April 1971 (aged 24)		(Costa Rica) Alajuelense
4	DF	Pablo Chinchilla	21 December 1978 (aged 16)		(Costa Rica) Alajuelense
6	DF	Evaristo Contreras	29 January 1970 (aged 25)		(Costa Rica) Ramonense
3	DF	Reynaldo Parks	4 December 1974 (aged 20)		(Costa Rica) Herediano
21	DF	Alexánder Madrigal	6 May 1972 (aged 23)		(Costa Rica) Cartaginés
15	DF	Mauricio Montero	19 October 1963 (aged 32)		(Costa Rica) Alajuelense
19	DF	Carlos Ulate			(Costa Rica) Cartaginés
13	DF	Mauricio Wright	20 December 1970 (aged 24)		(Costa Rica) Saprissa
10	MF	Floyd Guthrie	14 March 1966 (aged 29)		(Honduras) Victoria
5	MF	Wílmer López	3 August 1971 (aged 24)		(Costa Rica) Alajuelense
7	MF	Sergio Morales	16 February 1973 (aged 22)		(Costa Rica) Ramonense
11	MF	Roy Myers	13 April 1969 (aged 26)		(Costa Rica) Saprissa
16	MF	Mauricio Solís	13 December 1972 (aged 22)		(Costa Rica) Herediano
8	FW	Jewison Bennett	2 November 1976 (aged 19)		(Costa Rica) Cartaginés
9	FW	Rolando Fonseca	6 June 1974 (aged 21)		(Costa Rica) Saprissa
12	FW	Hernán Medford	23 May 1968 (aged 27)		(Mexico) Pachuca
20	FW	Carlos Alberto Wanchope	15 April 1971 (aged 24)		(Costa Rica) Herediano

Players who did not travel with the delegation:

No.	Pos.	Player	Date of birth (age)	Caps	Club
22	GK	Pedro Cubillo	12 May 1968 (aged 27)		(Honduras) Marathón
24	DF	Luis Antonio Marín	10 August 1974 (aged 21)		(Costa Rica) Alajuelense
17	MF	Sergio Morales Araya	16 February 1973 (aged 22)		(Costa Rica) Belén
14	FW	Carlos Mario Hidalgo	15 February 1963 (aged 32)		(Costa Rica) Cartaginés
23	FW	Max Pérez	23 June 1974 (aged 21)		(Mexico) Cruz Azul

=== El Salvador ===
Head coach: (Argentina) José Omar Pastoriza

No.	Pos.	Player	Date of birth (age)	Caps	Club
1	GK	Adolfo Humberto Menéndez	13 April 1970 (aged 25)		(El Salvador) FAS
12	GK	Raúl Antonio García	13 September 1962 (aged 33)		(El Salvador) Águila
2	DF	José Roberto Hernández	15 September 1968 (aged 27)		(El Salvador) Águila
4	DF	Leonel Cárcamo Batres	5 May 1965 (aged 30)		(El Salvador) Luis Ángel Firpo
6	DF	William Adalberto Osorio	13 April 1971 (aged 24)		(El Salvador) FAS
13	DF	Giovanni Trigueros Martínez	8 December 1966 (aged 28)		(El Salvador) Luis Ángel Firpo
16	DF	Mario Mayén Meza	19 May 1968 (aged 27)		(El Salvador) FAS
20	DF	Jaime Vladimir Cubías	10 March 1974 (aged 21)		(El Salvador) FAS
8	MF	Wilfredo Iraheta Sanabria	22 February 1967 (aged 28)		(El Salvador) Águila
10	MF	Marlon Menjívar	1 September 1965 (aged 30)		(El Salvador) Luis Ángel Firpo
14	MF	Jorge Humberto Rodriguez	20 May 1971 (aged 24)		(El Salvador) FAS
15	MF	Erber Alfredo Burgos	8 April 1969 (aged 26)		(El Salvador) FAS
19	MF	José Mauricio Cienfuegos	12 February 1968 (aged 27)		(El Salvador) Luis Ángel Firpo
21	MF	José Guillermo Rivera	25 November 1969 (aged 26)		(El Salvador) FAS
7	FW	Ronald Osvaldo Cerritos	3 January 1975 (aged 20)		(El Salvador) ADET
9	FW	Raúl Ignacio Díaz Arce	1 February 1970 (aged 25)		(El Salvador) Luis Ángel Firpo
11	FW	William Alexander Renderos	3 October 1971 (aged 24)		(El Salvador) Luis Ángel Firpo

Players with did not travel with the delegation:

No.	Pos.	Player	Date of birth (age)	Caps	Club
22	GK	Nicolás Orlando Chávez	6 December 1959 (aged 35)		(El Salvador) Alianza
5	MF	Raúl Toro	29 April 1973 (aged 22)		(El Salvador) Luis Ángel Firpo
18	MF	Juan Agustín Gámez	29 April 1973 (aged 22)		(El Salvador) Luis Ángel Firpo
17	FW	Carlos Osmel Zapata	14 April 1959 (aged 36)		(El Salvador) Luis Ángel Firpo
23	FW	José María Batres	2 August 1965 (aged 30)		(El Salvador) Municipal Limeño

== Group B ==
=== Guatemala ===
Head coach: (Guatemala) Jorge Roldán

No.	Pos.	Player	Date of birth (age)	Caps	Club
1	GK	Edgar Estrada	16 November 1967 (aged 28)	0	(Guatemala) Comunicaciones
2	DF	Julio Girón	2 March 1970 (aged 25)	3	(Guatemala) Aurora
3	DF	Erlin Luna	6 September 1967 (aged 28)	1	(Guatemala) Sacachispas
4	DF	Iván León	3 March 1967 (aged 28)	11	(Guatemala) Comunicaciones
6	DF	Martín Machón	4 February 1973 (aged 22)	5	(Guatemala) Comunicaciones
8	DF	Maynor Castro	24 February 1972 (aged 23)	0	(Guatemala) Sacachispas
15	DF	German Ruano	17 October 1971 (aged 24)	0	(Guatemala) Municipal
19	DF	Erick Miranda	17 December 1971 (aged 23)	3	(Guatemala) Comunicaciones
5	MF	Juan Manuel Funes	16 May 1966 (aged 29)		(Guatemala) Municipal
10	MF	Engelver Herrera	11 May 1973 (aged 22)	0	(Guatemala) Comunicaciones
11	MF	Carlos Lemus	17 June 1974 (aged 21)	0	(Guatemala) Deportivo Amatitlán
20	MF	Edgar Valencia	31 March 1971 (aged 24)	2	(Guatemala) Municipal
22	MF	Jorge Rodas	9 October 1971 (aged 24)	2	(Guatemala) Comunicaciones
7	FW	Roberto Montepeque	9 March 1966 (aged 29)		(Guatemala) Municipal
9	FW	Julio Rodas	9 December 1966 (aged 28)		(El Salvador) FAS
13	FW	Edgar Arriaza	16 April 1968 (aged 27)		(Guatemala) Comunicaciones
16	FW	Sergio Díaz	5 February 1970 (aged 25)		(Guatemala) Municipal

Players who did not travel with the delegation:

No.	Pos.	Player	Date of birth (age)	Caps	Club
18	GK	Edgar Ricardo Jérez	6 August 1956 (aged 39)		(Guatemala) Comunicaciones
17	DF	Eduardo Acevedo Pineda	8 June 1964 (aged 31)		(Guatemala) Comunicaciones
12	MF	Gonzalo Antonio Romero	25 March 1975 (aged 20)		(Guatemala) Municipal
21	MF	Freddy Alexander García	12 January 1977 (aged 18)		(Guatemala) USAC
20	FW	Raul Chácon Cabrera	8 May 1964 (aged 31)		(Guatemala) Atlético Mictlán
24	FW	Juan Carlos Plata	1 January 1971 (aged 24)		(Guatemala) Municipal

=== Honduras ===
Head coach: (Honduras) Carlos Cruz Carranza

No.	Pos.	Player	Date of birth (age)	Caps	Club
1	GK	Wilmer Cruz	18 December 1965 (aged 29)		(Honduras) Motagua
13	GK	Milton Flores	5 December 1974 (aged 20)		(Honduras) Real España
2	DF	Hernaín Arzú	13 October 1967 (aged 28)		(Honduras) Motagua
3	DF	Arnold Cruz	22 December 1970 (aged 24)		(Mexico) Toluca
4	DF	Norberto Martínez	6 June 1966 (aged 29)		(Honduras) Olimpia
6	DF	Raúl Martínez Sambulá	14 March 1963 (aged 32)		(Honduras) Victoria
8	DF	Basilio Zapata	16 May 1966 (aged 29)		(Honduras) Marathón
18	DF	José Alberto Fernández	29 November 1970 (aged 24)		(Honduras) Olimpia
19	DF	Rudy Williams	25 August 1965 (aged 30)		(Honduras) Olimpia
5	MF	Rodolfo Richardson Smith	24 February 1963 (aged 32)		(Honduras) Real España
10	MF	Christian Santamaría	20 December 1972 (aged 22)		(Honduras) Olimpia
12	MF	José Ramón Romero	3 March 1973 (aged 22)		(Honduras) Motagua
14	MF	José Gregorio Álvarez	18 April 1970 (aged 25)		(Honduras) Olimpia
15	MF	Édgar Sierra	23 June 1973 (aged 22)		(Honduras) Motagua
17	MF	Nahamán González	23 June 1967 (aged 28)		(Costa Rica) Alajuelense
21	MF	Amado Guevara	2 May 1976 (aged 19)		(Spain) Real Valladolid
23	MF	Martín Castro	3 December 1969 (aged 25)		(Honduras) Real España
7	FW	Carlos Pavón	9 October 1973 (aged 22)		(Mexico) San Luis
9	FW	Jorge Ernesto Pineda	26 November 1964 (aged 31)		(Honduras) Vida
11	FW	Nicolás Suazo	9 January 1965 (aged 30)		(Costa Rica) Herediano
16	FW	Dennis Piedy	22 August 1974 (aged 21)		(Honduras) Olimpia
20	FW	Milton Núñez	31 October 1972 (aged 23)		(Guatemala) Comunicaciones

Players who did not travel with the delegation:

No.	Pos.	Player	Date of birth (age)	Caps	Club
24	GK	Belarmino Rivera	6 February 1956 (aged 39)		(Honduras) Club Pumas de la UNAH
22	FW	Álex Ávila	26 February 1976 (aged 19)		(Honduras) Independiente de San Pedro Sula

=== Panama ===
Head coach: (Colombia) César Maturana

No.	Pos.	Player	Date of birth (age)	Caps	Club
1	GK	Martín Leonel Tuñon	7 February 1972 (aged 23)		(Panama) Árabe Unido
12	GK	Rogelio Igualá	16 February 1967 (aged 28)		(Panama) Euro Kickers
21	GK	Ricardo James	7 May 1966 (aged 29)		(Honduras) Platense
2	DF	José Mario Anthony Torres	27 August 1972 (aged 23)		(Honduras) Platense
3	DF	Rogelio Clarke	9 February 1964 (aged 31)		(Panama) Árabe Unido
4	DF	Franklin Ulises Delgado	18 February 1966 (aged 29)		(Honduras) Platense
6	DF	Luis Carlos Sánchez	9 January 1974 (aged 21)		(Colombia) Cúcuta Deportivo
13	DF	Fernando Bolívar	17 February 1967 (aged 28)		(Panama) Euro Kickers
15	DF	Noel Bartley	10 October 1970 (aged 25)		(Panama) San Francisco
20	DF	Leonel Phillips	12 December 1970 (aged 24)		(Panama) Árabe Unido
5	MF	Abdul Chiari	13 January 1971 (aged 24)		(Panama) Árabe Unido
8	MF	Óscar Salazar	2 June 1969 (aged 26)		(Panama) San Francisco
10	MF	Rubén Elias Guevara	27 January 1964 (aged 31)		(Panama) Tauro
11	MF	Frank Lozada	6 October 1965 (aged 30)		(Costa Rica) Puntarenas
16	MF	Mauro Quiroz	12 December 1970 (aged 24)		(Panama) Árabe Unido
17	MF	Julio Medina	14 July 1976 (aged 19)		(Panama) Árabe Unido
23	MF	Ángel Luis Rodríguez	15 February 1976 (aged 19)		(Panama) Tauro
7	FW	Ferdín Sánchez	12 December 1976 (aged 18)		(Panama) Altamira
9	FW	Erick Ortega	27 February 1968 (aged 27)		(Panama) Alianza
14	FW	Armando Dely Valdés	5 January 1964 (aged 31)		(Panama) Plaza Amador
19	FW	Wálter Pino	3 August 1978 (aged 17)		(Panama) Árabe Unido
18	FW	Agustín Salinas	17 May 1974 (aged 21)		(Panama) Orión
22	FW	Julio Dely Valdés	12 March 1967 (aged 28)		(France) Paris Saint-Germain
23	FW	Pércival Antonio Piggott	23 November 1966 (aged 29)		(Honduras) Victoria
27	FW	José Faraux	13 February 1971 (aged 24)		(Panama) Río Abajo
28	FW	Jorge Dely Valdés	12 March 1967 (aged 28)		(Japan) Cerezo Osaka
