= Rándall Row =

Costa Rican footballer (born 1971)

Personal information
- Full name: Rándall Row Arias
- Date of birth: April 21, 1971 (age 55)
- Place of birth: Turrialba, Costa Rica
- Position: Defender

Senior career*
Years	Team	Apps	(Gls)
1991–1995	Turrialba		
1996–1997	Herediano		
1998–2002	Saprissa		
2002–2003	Municipal Liberia		
2003–2004	Cartaginés		

International career
1991–1999	Costa Rica	16	(1)

Managerial career
- 2008–2014: Saprissa (assistant)
- 2016–2020: Sporting F.C.
- * Club domestic league appearances and goals

Rándall Row Arias (born 21 April 1971) is a Costa Rican former footballer who played most of his career with Deportivo Saprissa, during the 1990s.

== Club career ==
With Saprissa, he won several national championships, but also played for his native Turrialba, Herediano, Municipal Liberia and Cartaginés. Known for his small size and huge heart, he is remembered for being a very tough defender. He retired in 2004 after 14 years in the Primera División.

== International career ==
Row made his debut for Costa Rica in a November 1991 friendly match against Brazil and earned a total of 16 caps, scoring 1 goal. He represented his country in 1 FIFA World Cup qualification match and played at the 1993 and 1999 UNCAF Nations Cups.

His final international was a March 1999 UNCAF Nations Cup match against El Salvador.

=== International goals ===
Scores and results list Costa Rica's goal tally first.

N.	Date	Venue	Opponent	Score	Result	Competition
1.	28 March 1993	Estadio Nacional, San José, Costa Rica	El Salvador	2–0	4–0	1999 UNCAF Nations Cup

== Managerial career ==
After retiring, he began a very successful coaching career inside Saprissa's minor league system, winning several national championships with his teams. Since Hernan Medford and his coaching staff were announced by the Federación Costarricense de Fútbol as the new coaches for the Costa Rica national football team, Jeaustin Campos was named by Saprissa as their new head coach, and Row was appointed as assistant coach. He was dismissed by Saprissa in September 2014, alongside manager Rónald González.

== Personal life ==
Row is married to Gabriela Solano and they have three children, one of them being Randall Row Jr who also is a Costa Rican footballer who plays in Costa Rica’s second division for Sporting San José.
