= Estudiantes F.C. =

- Full name: Estudiantes Football Club
- Founded: 2007
- Dissolved: 2008
- Ground: Estadio Cuscatlán
- Capacity: 52,900
Home colours

Estudiantes Football Club was a professional football club located in San Salvador, El Salvador that participated in Segunda División de Fútbol Salvadoreño from 2007 to 2008.

The club played its home games at Estadio Cuscatlán, which is the largest stadium in El Salvador.

== History ==
Estudiantes was a team founded by Fundación Educando a un Salvadoreño, otherwise known as FESA. It was created with the hope of helping develop young players and FESA scholarship holders into professional footballers. After only one season, Estudiantes sold their spot in the Segunda División to Once Lobos. They have since ceased operations.

=== Turín FESA ===
FESA then joined forces with Turín FC to form Turín FESA F.C.

== Head coaches ==
- (El Salvador) Raúl Antonio García (Clausura 2007-Apertura 2008)

== Home stadium ==
- Estadio Cuscatlán

== Year-by-year ==
Year	Reg. season	Finals
Apertura 2007	9th	Did not qualify
Clausura 2008	9th	Did not qualify
