= Juan de Dios Ramírez =

Mexican footballer (born 1969)

Personal information
- Full name: Juan de Dios Ramírez Perales
- Date of birth: 8 March 1969 (age 57)
- Place of birth: Mexico City, Mexico
- Height: 1.75 m (5 ft 9 in)
- Position: Defender

Senior career*
Years	Team	Apps	(Gls)
1988–1994	Pumas	155	(1)
1994–1995	C.F. Monterrey	25	(0)
1995–1996	Toros Neza	31	(0)
1996–2000	Atlante F.C.	119	(0)
2000–2001	C.D. Guadalajara	15	(0)
2001	Pumas	27	(0)
2001	Irapuato F.C.	6	(0)
2002	C.D. Veracruz	2	(0)
Total		380	(1)

International career
1991–1995	Mexico	49	(0)

Managerial career
- 2004–2005: Tiburones Rojos de Veracruz (Assistant)
- 2006: Santos Laguna (Assistant)
- 2007–2009: Pumas Morelos
- 2010–2011: San Luis
- 2012: Guadalajara (Assistant)
- 2013: Pumas (Assistant)
- 2014: Irapuato
- 2014–2016: Mexico Olympic (Assistant)
- 2018: Necaxa Reserves and Academy
- 2019–2021: León (Assistant)
- 2022: Toluca (assistant)
- 2023–2025: Pumas (youth)
- 2025-2026: León (Assistant)
Medal record
Representing Mexico
Runner-up	Copa America	1993
- * Club domestic league appearances and goals as of 12–07–10

Juan de Dios Ramírez Perales, dubbed "El Capi" (born 8 March 1969) is a Mexican former professional footballer who played as a defender.

Ramírez Perales played for nearly 15 years in Mexico's league top tier, beginning his career with Pumas in 1988. By the following year he had become a starter in central defense, and he started 41 matches in 1990–91 as Pumas won the league, overcoming Club América in the final. He remained with Pumas until 1994, then joined Monterrey for one season and Toros Neza for another before moving to Atlante for the Invierno 1996 season. Playing alongside Romanian Miodrag Belodedici, Ramírez Perales helped form a strong central defensive pairing, but Atlante's seasons during this time repeatedly ended in disappointment in the knockout Liguilla phase. Leaving Atlante in 2000, he represented Chivas, Irapuato, and Veracruz in the closing years of his career.

At international level, he earned 49 caps for the Mexico national team between 1991 and 1995. Ramírez Perales made his international debut against the United States on 12 March 1991. Under César Luis Menotti and then Miguel Mejía Baron, he became a starter for the national team throughout World Cup qualifying and the 1993 Copa América, in which he played every minute of Mexico's six matches on the way to the final. Likewise, Ramírez Perales started all four games at the 1994 FIFA World Cup, lining up next to Claudio Suárez in the heart of the Mexico defense. He was recalled for the 1995 Copa América, but only appeared in the opening game. Ramírez Perales earned his final cap on 6 July 1995 in a 2–1 loss against Paraguay, and was replaced by Manuel Vidrio in central defense for Mexico's remaining matches in the competition.

In addition, Ramírez Perales played three games for Mexico at the 1985 FIFA U-16 World Championship in China.

== Honours ==
Mexico

- Copa América runner-up: 1993
