= Francisco Uribe =

Mexican footballer (born 1966)

Personal information
- Full name: Juan Francisco Uribe Ronquillo
- Date of birth: 11 January 1966 (age 60)
- Place of birth: Tehuacán, Puebla, Mexico
- Height: 1.84 m (6 ft 0 in)
- Position: Striker

Senior career*
Years	Team	Apps	(Gls)
1985–1986	UNAM Pumas	11	(1)
1986–1988	Coyotes	58	(6)
1988–1989	Atlético Potosino	35	(10)
1989–1990	Atlante	32	(7)
1990–1991	León	63	(20)
1992–1996	América	66	(13)
1996–1997	Tigres		
1997–1998	Veracruz	22	(7)
1998	San Jose Clash	12	(2)
1999	Puebla	4	(0)
1999–2001	León	29	(2)

International career
1991–1993	Mexico	19	(9)
- * Club domestic league appearances and goals

Juan Francisco Uribe Ronquillo (Note: In this Spanish name, the first or paternal surname is Uribe and the second or maternal family name is Ronquillo.) (born 11 January 1966) is a Mexican former footballer who played as a striker. He spent his entire career in Mexico, except for one year in the United States' Major League Soccer.
