= Benjamín Mayorga =

Costa Rican footballer (born 1966)

Personal information
- Full name: Benjamín Joel Mayorga Mora
- Date of birth: 15 October 1966 (age 60)
- Place of birth: Talamanca, Costa Rica
- Position: Midfielder

Youth career
- 1980–1984: Saprissa

Senior career*
Years	Team	Apps	(Gls)
1984–1997	Saprissa	343	(11)
1997-1998	Herediano	44	(1)
1998–1999	USAC	25	(0)
1999–2001	Carmelita	47	(1)

International career
1991–1997	Costa Rica	21	(1)

Managerial career
- 2004–2006: Belén
- 2006–2008: Turrialba
- * Club domestic league appearances and goals

Benjamín Mayorga Mora (born 15 October 1966), otherwise known as El Indio (The Indian) or simply as Mincho, is a retired Costa Rican soccer player from the 1980s and 1990s.

He played most of his career at Deportivo Saprissa. "Mincho" became the most recognizable representative for the Native American race in Costa Rica, due to his Bribri origin.

== Club career ==
Born in an Indian reservation in Talamanca, Mayorga came to San José with his sister to study in 1980 and soon joined the Saprissa youth team set-up. He made his senior league debut for Saprissa on 14 October 1984 against Ramonense, scored his first goal on 21 September 1986 against Sagrada Familia and won five national championships, as well as two CONCACAF Champions Cup titles with Saprissa. He was sent-off 12 times during his time with Saprissa.

In January 1997 he joined Herediano and in 1998 he moved abroad to play for Guatemalan side USAC alongside compatriots Try Bennett and Luis Marín

== International career ==
Mayorga made his debut for Costa Rica in a June 1991 friendly match against Colombia and earned a total of 21 caps, scoring 1 goal. He represented his country in 8 FIFA World Cup qualification matches and played at the 1997 UNCAF Nations Cup, becoming the only 100% pure Indian-blooded international player in the world during that period of time.

His final international was a FIFA World Cup qualification match against Jamaica on 11 May 1997, retiring from international football because of injury problems.

=== International goals ===
Scores and results list Costa Rica's goal tally first.

N.	Date	Venue	Opponent	Score	Result	Competition
1.	23 September 1992	Estádio Rubens Felipe, Paranavaí, Brazil	Brazil		2–4	Friendly match

== Managerial career ==
After his retirement in 1999, Mincho has pursued a coaching career with several teams in Costa Rica, and has continued to carry with much pride his Indian representation in Costa Rica's society, even in the political arena.

He was in charge of Belén and Municipal Turrialba.

== Personal life ==
Mayorga is married and has three children. He lives between Coronado and an operations center in Chiroles de Talamanca.
