= César Obando =

Honduran footballer (born 1969)

Personal information
- Full name: César Augusto Obando Villeda
- Date of birth: 26 October 1969 (age 57)
- Place of birth: Tegucigalpa, Honduras
- Height: 1.66 m (5 ft 5 1/2 in)
- Position: Midfielder

Senior career*
| Years | Team | Apps | (Gls) |
| 1988–1994 | Motagua | | (23) |
| 1994 | Universitario | | |
| 1994–1996 | UA Tamaulipas | 11 | (2) |
| 1998 | Victoria | | |
- Vida
- Pumas UNAH
| 2000 | Real España | | |
| 2001–2002 | Motagua | | |
| 2002–2003 | Cartaginés | | |

International career
| 1991–2002 | Honduras | 33 | (15) |

Managerial career
- 2012: Necaxa (assistant)
- 2012: Pumas San Isidro
- 2013–: Motagua Reserves
- * Club domestic league appearances and goals

César Augusto Obando Villeda, nicknamed El Nene, (born 26 October 1969) is a retired Honduran professional football player who played as a midfielder. He is considered one of the best players ever in Honduras but a serious injury cut his career short.

== Club career ==
The diminutive Obando played in the Liga Nacional de Fútbol de Honduras for F.C. Motagua, C.D. Victoria and Real C.D. España. He also played abroad with Mexican outfit Correcaminos UAT, with fellow Honduran Eugenio Dolmo Flores at Peruvian side Universitario and in Costa Rica with Cartaginés. At Cartaginés, he played alongside compatriots Arnold Cruz and Christian Santamaría but was released in February 2003.

He played in the 1994 Copa Libertadores with Universitario, where the club were eliminated by Independiente Medellín in the knock-out stages. In 1992, he was named World's Top Goal Scorer of the Year by the IFFHS.

His last game as a professional player in the Honduran league was on 21 May 2002 with his team F.C. Motagua defeating C.D. Olimpia 2 - 1. He is known for his powerful right footed shot. He scored 23 league goals for Motagua.

== International career ==
Obando made his debut for Honduras in a May 1991 UNCAF Nations Cup match against Panama and has earned a total of 33 caps, scoring 15 goals. He has represented his country in 7 FIFA World Cup qualification matches and played at the 1991 UNCAF Nations Cup.

His final international was a March 2002 friendly match against the United States.

=== International goals ===
Scores and results list Honduras' goal tally first.

| N. | Date | Venue | Opponent | Score | Result | Competition |
|---|---|---|---|---|---|---|
| 1. | 30 June 1992 | Estadio Olímpico Metropolitano, San Pedro Sula, Honduras | Panama | 4–0 | 4-0 | Friendly match |
| 2. | 26 July 1992 | Estadio Tiburcio Carías Andino, Tegucigalpa, Honduras | Guatemala | 1–0 | 2-0 | 1994 FIFA World Cup qualification |
| 3. | 12 August 1992 | Memorial Coliseum, Los Angeles, United States | El Salvador | 3–0 | 2-0 | Friendly match |
| 4. | 13 September 1992 | Estadio Cuscatlán, San Salvador, El Salvador | El Salvador | 1–0 | 1–3 | Friendly match |
| 5. | 22 September 1992 | Estadio Tiburcio Carías Andino, Tegucigalpa, Honduras | Jamaica | 1–1 | 5–1 | Friendly match |
| 6. | 24 September 1992 | Estadio Olímpico Metropolitano, San Pedro Sula, Honduras | Jamaica | 1–0 | 7–0 | Friendly match |
| 7. | 24 September 1992 | Estadio Olímpico Metropolitano, San Pedro Sula, Honduras | Jamaica | 3–0 | 7–0 | Friendly match |
| 8. | 24 September 1992 | Estadio Olímpico Metropolitano, San Pedro Sula, Honduras | Jamaica | 5–0 | 7–0 | Friendly match |
| 9. | 8 November 1992 | Estadio Nacional de Costa Rica (1924), San José, Costa Rica | Costa Rica | 3–2 | 3-2 | 1994 FIFA World Cup qualification |
| 10. | 28 November 1992 | Estadio Tiburcio Carías Andino, Tegucigalpa, Honduras | Saint Vincent and the Grenadines | 2–0 | 4-0 | 1994 FIFA World Cup qualification |
| 11. | 5 December 1992 | Estadio Tiburcio Carías Andino, Tegucigalpa, Honduras | Costa Rica | 2–0 | 2-1 | 1994 FIFA World Cup qualification |
| 12. | 25 March 1993 | Estadio Tiburcio Carías Andino, Tegucigalpa, Honduras | United States | 3–1 | 4-1 | Friendly match |
| 13. | 4 April 1993 | Estadio Tiburcio Carías Andino, Tegucigalpa, Honduras | Canada | 2–2 | 2–2 | 1994 FIFA World Cup qualification |
| 14. | 17 November 1998 | Memorial Coliseum, Los Angeles, United States | Guatemala | 2–3 | 3–3 | Hurricane Relief Tournament |
| 15. | 18 November 1998 | Memorial Coliseum, Los Angeles, United States | El Salvador | 1–0 | 2–1 | Hurricane Relief Tournament |

== Managerial career ==
Obando was named Motagua's reserves coach in 2013.

He was then made coach of a bilingual school called International School of Tegucigalpa (IST) at the capital of Honduras.
