= Miguel España =

Mexican footballer and manager (born 1964)

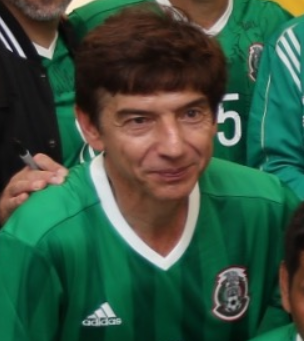
- Espana in 2017

Personal information
- Full name: Miguel España Garcés
- Date of birth: 31 January 1964 (age 62)
- Place of birth: Mexico City, Mexico
- Height: 1.75 m (5 ft 9 in)
- Position: Midfielder

Senior career*
Years	Team	Apps	(Gls)
1983–1994	Pumas UNAM	342	(10)
1994–1995	Tigres UANL	33	(0)
1995–2001	Santos Laguna	187	(1)
2001–2003	Pumas UNAM	65	(0)
Total		627	(11)

International career
1984–1994	Mexico	81	(2)

Managerial career
- 2005–2006: Pumas UNAM
- 2022–2023: Chilangos
Medal record
Representing Mexico
Runner-up	Copa America	1993
- * Club domestic league appearances and goals

Miguel España Garcés (born 31 January 1964) is a Mexican former professional footballer and manager. He was a player of Pumas UNAM, and took over as coach after Hugo Sánchez stepped down as coach, and he took them to the Copa Sudamericana 2005 cup final which they lost. España also played in the 1986 FIFA World Cup.

== International career ==
España made 81 appearances and scored two goals for Mexico from 1984 to 1994.

== Career statistics ==
=== International goals ===
No.	Date	Venue	Opponent	Score	Result	Competition	Ref.
1.	November 11, 1984	Port of Spain, Trinidad & Tobago	Trinidad & Tobago	2–0	Win	Friendly	
2.	October 6, 1987	Toluca, Mexico	Canada	4–0	Win	Friendly	

== Managerial career ==
=== Pumas UNAM ===
In November 2005, España began his career as a manager when he was appointed as interim coach of the Pumas UNAM of the Mexican Primera División. Although he lost two of the three matches coached during the Torneo Apertura 2005, he managed to reach the final of the 2005 Copa Sudamericana, in which Pumas UNAM was defeated by Boca Juniors, for which he was confirmed in office for the Clausura 2006 tournament.

In April 2006, Miguel España was fired from his position after 12 games played, in which Pumas UNAM only managed to win three, thus ending his first stage as manager.

=== Borregos Salvajes ITESM CCM ===
After his time at Pumas UNAM, Miguel España was appointed as coach of the Borregos Salvajes football team at the university Tecnológico de Monterrey Campus Ciudad de México.

=== Chilangos F.C. ===
In August 2022, he returned to being a manager in a professional team when he was named in charge of Chilangos F.C., a team that at that time was part of the Liga TDP, the fourth-tier of Mexican football. In the summer of 2023 the team managed to promote to the third level after purchasing an expansion franchise. However, España was not able to find a way for the club at a higher competitive level, so he was fired on September 19, 2023 after failing to win in six games played.

== Honours ==
Pumas UNAM

- Mexican Primera División: 1990–91
- CONCACAF Champions' Cup: 1989

Santos Laguna

- Mexican Primera División: Invierno 1996
