= Eduardo Fernández (Mexican footballer) =

Mexican footballer (born 1990)

Personal information
- Full name: Eduardo Fernández Aldana
- Date of birth: 4 March 1990 (age 36)
- Place of birth: Pachuca, Hidalgo Mexico
- Height: 1.77 m (5 ft 9 1/2 in)
- Position: Midfielder

Youth career
- 2007–2008: Universidad del Fútbol
- 2009: Alto Rendimiento Tuzo
- 2010: Pachuca

Senior career*
Years	Team	Apps	(Gls)
2010–2011	Tampico Madero	22	(4)
2011–2012	Titanes de Tulancingo	24	(3)
2012–2013	Murciélagos F.C.	30	(3)
2013–2023	Venados	138	(9)
2015	→ Coras (loan)	0	(0)
- * Club domestic league appearances and goals as of 3 February 2021

Eduardo Fernández Aldana (born 4 March 1990) is a Mexican footballer who currently plays for Venados.
