= Rónald Gómez =

Costa Rican footballer (born 1975)

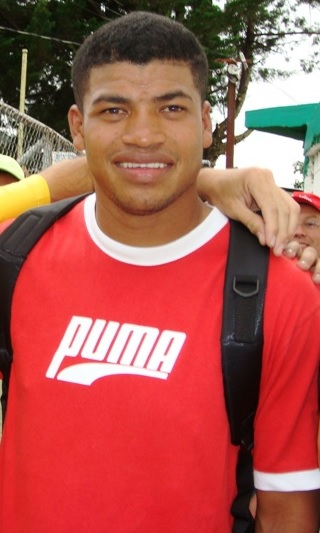
- Gómez in 2007

Personal information
- Full name: Rónald Gómez Gómez
- Date of birth: 24 January 1975 (age 51)
- Place of birth: Puntarenas, Costa Rica
- Height: 1.83 m (6 ft 0 in)
- Position: Forward

Team information
- Current team: Coatepeque F. C. (Manager)

Senior career*
Years	Team	Apps	(Gls)
1992–1994	Carmelita	27	(9)
1994–1996	Alajuelense	68	(45)
1996–1997	Sporting Gijón	21	(2)
1997–1998	Hércules	11	(4)
1998–1999	Municipal		(22)
1999–2002	OFI	87	(39)
2002–2003	Al Qadsia		(2)
2004	→ Irapuato (loan)	16	(2)
2004–2006	Saprissa	61	(13)
2006–2007	APOEL	20	(4)
2007–2008	Saprissa	28	(4)
2009	Santos de Guápiles	14	(2)
Total		353	(148)

International career
1993–2008	Costa Rica	93	(26)

Managerial career
- 2009: Carmelita
- 2010: Santos de Guápiles
- 2011: Deportivo Cartagena
- 2012: Juventud Escazuceña
- 2013: Halcones
- 2014: Limón
- 2016–2018: Xelajú
- 2018–2021: Malacateco
- 2021–2022: Costa Rica (assistant)
- 2023: Santa Lucía
- 2023–2024: Apollon Smyrnis
- 2024-: Achuapa
- * Club domestic league appearances and goals

Rónald Gómez Gómez (born 24 January 1975) is a Costa Rican former football forward and manager. He is the current manager for Liga Nacional club Coatepeque Fútbol Club.

An important player on the Costa Rica national football team during the 1990s and 2000s, Gómez is regarded as one of Costa Rica's best forwards, known for his rocket shots and top dribbling.

Gómez is, along with Paulo Wanchope, the top scorer for Costa Rica in the FIFA World Cup with three goals.

== Club career ==
=== Early years ===
Born in Puntarenas as the 12th child of Francisca Gómez, he was raised in the village Pilas de Canjel in Guanacaste Province.

Nicknamed La Bala (The Bullit), Gómez started his career at Carmelita and scored his first league goal on 20 September 1992 against Saprissa. He then scored 45 goals for Alajuelense before moving abroad.

=== Years abroad ===
He has played in 6 different countries: in Spain with Sporting Gijón and Hercules of Alicante, in Guatemala with Municipal, in Greece with OFI, in Kuwait with Al Qadsia, in Mexico with Irapuato and in Cyprus with APOEL where he won the Cypriot First Division.

=== OFI Crete ===
In the summer of 1999, Greek OFI made the decision to sign Ronald Gómez from Guatemalan club Municipal, marking the Costa Rican striker's return to Europe after spells with Sporting de Gijón and Hércules CF. Despite some hesitation from the Cretan club due to the risks involved, the transfer was completed within a matter of hours, and Gómez quickly established himself as one of the most significant players to have graced Greek football during that era.

Known as a classic "number 9" of the 1990s, Gómez became a cult figure in Greece due to his exceptional goal-scoring ability. He made a lasting impact on OFI, scoring 48 goals in 105 appearances. His performance helped lead the team to the UEFA Cup in the 2000–01 season, thanks to an impressive tally of 19 goals that season.

=== Saprissa ===
With Saprissa, he has won 4 national championship; and 1 CONCACAF Champions Cup, and was part of the team that played the 2005 FIFA Club World Championship Toyota Cup where Saprissa finished third behind São Paulo and Liverpool. He scored the winning goal in the final minutes of the game that Saprissa won in order to achieve the third place of the tournament against Al-Ittihad. His goal was considered among the best of the cup.

=== Return from retirement ===
In June 2009, Gómez came out of playing retirement for a final season at Santos after he was relegated to the second division as manager of Carmelita. After the season, he became manager of Santos.

== International career ==
Gómez made his debut for Costa Rica in a February 1993 UNCAF Nations Cup qualification match against Nicaragua and earned a total of 93 caps, scoring 26 goals. He represented his country in 27 FIFA World Cup qualification matches and figured at the 2002 and 2006 World Cups. He also played at the 1993 and 2001 UNCAF Nations Cups as well as at the 1993, 2000 and 2002 CONCACAF Gold Cup and the 1997, 2001, and 2004 Copa América.

His final international was a March 2008 friendly match against Peru.

=== International goals ===
Scores and results list. Costa Rica's goal tally first.

Goal	Date	Venue	Opponent	Result	Competition
1	16 February 1993	Estadio Nacional de Costa Rica, San José, Costa Rica	Nicaragua	6–0	UNCAF Nations Cup qualifier
2	16 February 1993	Estadio Nacional de Costa Rica, San José, Costa Rica	Nicaragua	6–0	UNCAF Nations Cup qualifier
3	5 March 1993	Estadio Tiburcio Carías Andino, Tegucigalpa	El Salvador	1–0	UNCAF Nations Cup
–	23 June 1993	Estadio Nacional de Costa Rica, San José, Costa Rica	Panama	3–1	Unofficial friendly match
4	27 September 1993	Prince Mohamed bin Fahd Stadium, Dammam, Saudi Arabia	Saudi Arabia	2–3	Friendly match
5	17 December 1994	King Fahd International Stadium, Riyadh, Saudi Arabia	Saudi Arabia	3–1	Friendly match
6	17 December 1994	King Fahd International Stadium, Riyadh, Saudi Arabia	Saudi Arabia	3–1	Friendly match
7	17 December 1994	King Fahd International Stadium, Riyadh, Saudi Arabia	Saudi Arabia	3–1	Friendly match
8	5 June 1996	Varsity Stadium, Toronto, Canada	Canada	1–0	Friendly match
9	1 September 1996	Queen's Park Oval, Port of Spain, Trinidad and Tobago	Trinidad and Tobago	1–0	1998 FIFA World Cup qualification (CONCACAF)
10	14 December 1996	Stanford Stadium, Stanford, United States	United States	1–2	1998 FIFA World Cup qualification (CONCACAF)
11	23 March 1997	Estadio Ricardo Saprissa Aymá, San José, Costa Rica	United States	3–2	1998 FIFA World Cup qualification (CONCACAF)
12	17 July 1999	Titan Stadium, Fullerton, United States	Saudi Arabia	1–0	Friendly
13	18 August 1999	Estadio Centenario, Montevideo, Uruguay	Uruguay	4–5	Friendly
14	18 August 1999	Estadio Centenario, Montevideo, Uruguay	Uruguay	4–5	Friendly
15	30 May 2001	Estadio Olimpico Metropolitano, San Pedro Sula, Honduras	Panama	2–1	UNCAF Nations Cup
16	1 September 2001	Hasely Crawford Stadium, Port of Spain, Trinidad and Tobago	Trinidad and Tobago	2–0	World Cup qualifier
17	1 September 2001	Hasely Crawford Stadium, Port of Spain, Trinidad and Tobago	Trinidad and Tobago	2–0	World Cup qualifier
18	26 January 2002	Orange Bowl, Miami, United States	Haiti	2–1	2002 CONCACAF Gold Cup
19	30 January 2002	Rose Bowl, Pasadena, United States	South Korea	3–1	2002 CONCACAF Gold Cup
20	4 June 2002	Gwangju World Cup Stadium, Gwangju, South Korea	China	2–0	2002 FIFA World Cup
21	13 June 2002	Suwon World Cup Stadium, Suwon, South Korea	Brazil	2–5	2002 FIFA World Cup
22	20 June 2004	Estadio Alejandro Morera Soto, Alajuela, Costa Rica	Cuba	1–1	World Cup qualifier
23	8 June 2005	Estadio Ricardo Saprissa Aymá, San José, Costa Rica	Guatemala	3–2	World Cup qualifier
24	19 June 2005	Helong Stadium, Changsha, China	Panama	2–2	Friendly
25	3 September 2005	Estadio Rommel Fernández, Panama City, Panama	Panama	3–1	World Cup qualifier
26	20 June 2006	AWD-Arena, Hannover, Germany	Poland	1–2	2006 FIFA World Cup

== Managerial career ==
He made his debut as manager of Carmelita in January 2009. In October 2010 he was dismissed by Santos de Guápiles and he later managed second division sides Deportivo Cartagena and Juventud Escazuceña. In September 2013, he took charge of Guatemalan side Halcones and in May 2014 he returned to Costa Rica to take charge at Limón.

In August 2023, Ronald Gómez, a former OFI player, returned to Greece as the head coach of Apollon Smyrnis, a team that was preparing for the upcoming season in the Greek Football League (Gamma Ethniki). His appointment marked the return of a familiar face to Greek football, having been one of the top strikers for OFI during his playing career between 1999 and 2003. Prior to joining Apollon Smyrnis, Gómez had managed Santa Lucia F.C. in Guatemala. However, his tenure with Apollon Smyrnis ended on 28 February 2024.

After his departure from Apollon Smyrnis, Gómez took on the role of head coach at Deportivo Achuapa in Guatemala, where he began a new challenge, aiming to lead the team to the final phase of the Torneo Clausura 2024.

== Personal life ==
He is married to Gina Soto and they have two sons, Esteban and Daniel.

== Honours ==
- Primera División de Costa Rica (3):
  - 1995-96, 2005–06, 2007–08
- Copa Interclubes UNCAF (1):
  - 1996
- CONCACAF Champions' Cup (1):
  - 2005
- Cypriot First Division (1):
  - 2006–07

== See also ==
- List of Afro-Latinos
