= Marco Rizi =

Canadian soccer player

Personal information
- Full name: Marco Michele Graciano Rizi
- Date of birth: September 15, 1968 (age 58)
- Place of birth: Montreal, Quebec, Canada
- Height: 6 ft 1 in (1.85 m)
- Position: Defender

Senior career*
Years	Team	Apps	(Gls)
1988–1992	Montreal Supra	104	(9)
1990–1992	Cleveland Crunch (indoor)	45	(11)
1993	Detroit Rockers (indoor)	24	(3)
1993–1994, 1996	Montreal Impact	40	(3)
1993–1994	Canton Invaders (indoor)	9	(4)
1994	Chicago Power (indoor)	12	(3)
1994–1995	Canton Invaders (indoor)	9	(1)
1995	Seattle Sounders		
1995–1998	Buffalo Blizzard (indoor)	70	(26)
1996	Rochester Rhinos	10	(0)
1997	MetroStars	1	(0)
2000	Houston Hotshots (indoor)		
2001–2002	Cleveland Crunch (indoor)	18	(0)

International career^{‡}
1986–1987	Canada U-20	11	(0)
1992–1995	Canada	12	(0)
- * Club domestic league appearances and goals as of May 7, 2008 ‡ National team caps and goals as of May 7, 2008

Marco Rizi (born September 15, 1968 in Montreal, Quebec) is a former Canadian professional soccer player. Rizi played in the American Professional Soccer League, professional indoor soccer, and briefly in Major League Soccer.

== Club career ==
Rizi grew up in Montreal, graduating from Laurier Macdonald High School in 1985. He began his professional career in 1988 with Montreal Supra in the Canadian Soccer League. In 1990, after having spent most of September and the first half of October on trial with the Cleveland Crunch of the Major Indoor Soccer League, Rizi signed with the team on October 13, 1990. He was a regular with the Crunch during the 1990–1991 season and on July 31, 1991, the San Diego Sockers made him a contract offer. The Crunch met the offer a week later and Rizi remained in Cleveland for the 1991–1992 season. He lost eight games at the start of the season with a groin injury, then underwent arthroscopic surgery in February 1992 for torn cartilage in his left knee. He lost several weeks before returning to play only to break a bone in his left foot at the start of the playoffs. He returned to the Supra for the 1992 CSL season, but the team and the league collapsed at the end of the season.

In February 1993, Rizi signed with the Detroit Rockers of the National Professional Soccer League. On April 3, 1993, he joined the Montreal Impact of the American Professional Soccer League. He would play both the 1993 and 1994 APSL seasons in Montreal, scoring once in 24 games in 1993 and twice in 1994. In 1994, the Impact won the APSL championship. In the fall of 1993, he signed with the Canton Invaders. On February 27, 1994, the Chicago Power acquired Rizi from the Invaders in exchange for "future considerations". Rizi returned to the Invaders for the start of the 1994–1995 NPSL season.

On February 16, 1995, he moved to the Buffalo Blizzard. In May 1995, he signed with the Seattle Sounders of the A-League. Rizi and his teammates would win the league championship. He returned to the Blizzard for the 1995–1996 NPSL season, but broke his leg in the season opener and lost the remainder of the season. In 1996, he played for the Rochester Rhinos in the A-League. On May 3, 1997, he signed with the New York / New Jersey MetroStars, coming on to play 33 minutes as a substitute in one game. Rizi retired in 1998. On October 25, 2000, Rizi signed with the Houston Hotshots of the World Indoor Soccer League. In October 2001, he signed with the Cleveland Crunch.

== International career ==
He had played for the National Youth side under Tony Taylor in the 1980s and Rizi played two games at the 1987 Pan American Games. At the time, he was a member of the Canada U-20 men's national soccer team with which he earned 11 caps, including two at the 1987 FIFA World Youth Championship.

He made his senior debut for Canada in a September 1992 friendly match against the USA and went on to earn a total of 12 caps, scoring no goals. He has represented Canada in 2 FIFA World Cup qualification matches. His final international was an August 1995 Caribana Cup match against Jamaica.

Rizi is currently a soccer coach with Ohio Premier
