= Kentoine Jennings =

Bermudian footballer (born 1971)

Personal information
- Full name: Kentoine Jennings
- Date of birth: 15 October 1971 (age 55)
- Place of birth: Bermuda
- Position: Defender

Senior career*
Years	Team	Apps	(Gls)
- PHC Zebras
1990–1993	Hereford United	16	(0)
- Vasco da Gama
1999–2010	North Village Rams		
2010–2011	Prospect United		

International career
1990–2006	Bermuda	33	(2)
- * Club domestic league appearances and goals

Kentoine Jennings (born 15 October 1971) is a Bermudian former footballer who played as a defender. He made 33 appearances for the Bermuda national team scoring twice.

== Club career ==
Jennings played in the 1989 Bermudan FA Cup final for North Village Rams.

Jennings signed for English club Hereford United from PHC Zebras in 1990. Over the next two seasons, he made 16 appearances in the Football League, playing alongside compatriot Meshach Wade. They were spotted by manager John Sillett when playing their first international match against the United States.

He returned to Bermuda in 1993 to play with Vasco da Gama, before signing for North Village in 1999. In 2010, he played for Bermuda First Division side Prospect United.

== International career ==
He made his debut for Bermuda in a February 1990 friendly match against the USA and earned a total of 33 caps, scoring 2 goals. He also captained the national team.

His final international match was a September 2006 CONCACAF Gold Cup qualification match against the Dominican Republic. He announced his international retirement in 2007.

== Personal life ==
His younger brother is fellow footballer Kevin Jennings. He now works for the Bermuda Telephone Company.

== Career statistics ==
Scores and results list Bermuda's goal tally first, score column indicates score after each Jennings goal.

List of international goals scored by Kentoine Jennings
No.	Date	Venue	Opponent	Score	Result	Competition	Ref.
1	14 June 1992	Recreation Ground, St. John's, Antigua and Barbuda	Antigua and Barbuda	3–0	3–0	1994 FIFA World Cup qualification	
2	25 October 1992	National Stadium, Hamilton, Bermuda	Jamaica	1–0	1–1	1994 FIFA World Cup qualification	
