= Richard Smith (Costa Rican footballer) =

Costa Rican footballer (born 1967)

Personal information
- Full name: Richard Alexander Smith Hylton
- Date of birth: 29 December 1967 (age 58)
- Place of birth: Limón, Costa Rica
- Position: Midfielder

Senior career*
Years	Team	Apps	(Gls)
1988–1998	Alajuelense	315	(44)
1998–1999	Municipal	27	(2)
1999–2000	Antigua Guatemala	30	(7)
2000–2001	Santos de Guápiles	30	(2)
2001–2003	Carmelita	77	(12)
2003–2005	Antigua Guatemala	54	(6)
2005–2006	Carmelita	27	
2006–2007	4Limonense	8	(3)
Total		-	(99)

International career
1991–1997	Costa Rica	15	(3)
- * Club domestic league appearances and goals

Richard Alexander Smith Hylton (born 29 December 1967) is a Costa Rican former football player, who used to play as a midfielder.

== Club career ==
Nicknamed La Pantera, Smith made his Primera División debut for Alajuelense for whom he went on to score 44 goals in 315 matches during a 10-year spell. He played abroad for Guatemalan sides Municipal and Antigua Guatemala and had spells at Santos de Guápiles and Carmelita.

He retired in 2007 as player of Limonense.

== International career ==
Smith made his debut for Costa Rica in a November 1991 friendly match against the United States and earned a total of 15 caps, scoring 3 goals. He represented his country in 7 FIFA World Cup qualification matches and famously scored both goals in a World Cup qualifier against CONCACAF powerhouse Mexico in 1992.

His final internationals was a November 1997 FIFA World Cup qualification match against Canada.

== Personal life ==
Son of Ricardo Alfonso Smith and Eloísa Hylton, Smith is married to Jeannette Valerín and they have two children.
