= Javier Astúa =

Costa Rican footballer (1968–2022)

Personal information
- Full name: Antonio Javier Astúa Araya
- Date of birth: 6 November 1968
- Place of birth: Quepos, Costa Rica
- Date of death: 4 January 2022 (aged 53)
- Height: 1.75 m (5 ft 9 in)
- Position: Striker

Senior career*
Years	Team	Apps	(Gls)
1989–1992	Puntarenas	168	(46)
1993	Morelia		
1993	Puntarenas		
1994	Palestino	2	(0)
1994–1995	Alajuelense		
1995–1996	San Carlos		
1996–1997	Herediano		
1998–2000	Carmelita		

International career
1992–1994	Costa Rica	13	(7)

Managerial career
- 2011: Municipal Puntarenas
- 2013: Jicaral
- * Club domestic league appearances and goals

Antonio Javier Astúa Araya (6 November 1968 – 4 January 2022) was a Costa Rican professional footballer who played as a forward.

== Club career ==
Born in Quepos, Astúa played several years for Municipal Puntarenas and played two matches for Mexican outfit Morelia in September 1992. He had a frustrating four-month stint at Chilean side Palestino, before returning to Costa Rica where he joined Alajuelense. He later played for San Carlos, who released him in November 1995 after an injury-hit spell. In March 2006, he was released by Herediano. He finished his career at Carmelita before more injury cut short his career.

He was twice the Costa Rica Premier Division top goalscorer, in 1992 and 1994.

== International career ==
Astúa made his debut for Costa Rica in an April 1992 friendly against El Salvador and earned a total of 13 caps, scoring seven goals. He has represented his country in four FIFA World Cup qualification matches and played at the 1993 UNCAF Nations Cup.

He played his final international game in January 1994 against Norway.

== Later life and death ==
Astúa was married and had a daughter and a son, who was manager of Third Division side Jicaral in 2013. He died on 4 January 2022, at the age of 53.

== Career statistics ==
Scores and results list Costa Rica's goal tally first, score column indicates score after each Astúa goal.

List of international goals scored by Javier Astúa
No.	Date	Venue	Opponent	Score	Result	Competition
1	23 August 1992	Estadio Nacional de Costa Rica, San José, Costa Rica	Panama	5–0	5–1	1994 FIFA World Cup qualification
2	5 December 1992	Estadio Tiburcio Carías Andino, Tegucigalpa, Honduras	Honduras	1–2	1–2	1994 FIFA World Cup qualification
3	13 December 1992	Estadio Nacional de Costa Rica, San José, Costa Rica	Saint Vincent and the Grenadines	1–0	5–0	1994 FIFA World Cup qualification
4	13 December 1992	Estadio Nacional de Costa Rica, San José, Costa Rica	Saint Vincent and the Grenadines	3–0	5–0	1994 FIFA World Cup qualification
5	13 December 1992	Estadio Nacional de Costa Rica, San José, Costa Rica	Saint Vincent and the Grenadines	4–0	5–0	1994 FIFA World Cup qualification
6	16 February 1993	Estadio Nacional de Costa Rica, San José, Costa Rica	Nicaragua	1–0	6–0	1993 UNCAF Nations Cup qualification
7	16 February 1993	Estadio Nacional de Costa Rica, San José, Costa Rica	Nicaragua	3–0	6–0	1993 UNCAF Nations Cup qualification
