= Raúl García (footballer, born 1962) =

Salvadoran footballer (born 1962)

Personal information
- Full name: Raúl Antonio García Herrera
- Date of birth: September 13, 1962
- Place of birth: San Miguel, El Salvador
- Date of death: January 11, 2018 (aged 55)
- Position: Goalkeeper

Youth career
- Instituto Técnico Ricaldone
- 1980: UES

Senior career*
Years	Team	Apps	(Gls)
1981–1986	UES		
1987–1999	Águila		

International career
1986–1997	El Salvador	37	(0)

Managerial career
- 2006–2007: Estudiantes
- * Club domestic league appearances and goals

Raúl Antonio García Herrera (September 13, 1962 in San Miguel, El Salvador – January 11, 2018) was a Salvadoran professional footballer.

== Club career ==
García played the majority of his career with Primera División de Fútbol de El Salvador giants Águila, in San Miguel.

== International career ==
Nicknamed Superman, García made his debut for El Salvador in the 1980s and earned over 30 caps, scoring no goals. He represented his country in 17 FIFA World Cup qualification matches and played at the 1993 and 1995 UNCAF Nations Cup as well as at the 1996 CONCACAF Gold Cup.

His final international game was a November 1997 FIFA World Cup qualification match against the United States.

== Retirement ==
He was named El Salvador's goalkeeper coach ahead of the UNCAF U-16 tournament in 2009 and the UNCAF U-20 championships at the end of 2010.

== Death ==
Raul Garcia died due to cancer on January 11, 2018, he was 55 years old.
