= Richardson Smith =

Honduran footballer (born 1963)

Personal information
- Full name: Rodolfo Richardson Smith
- Date of birth: 24 February 1963 (age 63)
- Place of birth: San Pedro Sula, Honduras
- Position: Midfielder

Senior career*
Years	Team	Apps	(Gls)
1981–1988	Marathón		
- Real España
1988–1990	UA Tamaulipas	58	(13)
1990–1991	Real España		
1991	Peñarol		
1991–1992	UA Tamaulipas	30	(7)
1992–1993	Universidad Guadalajara	21	(3)
1993–1998	Real España		

International career
1985–1996	Honduras	33	(11)

Managerial career
- 2004–2005: Municipal Valencia
- * Club domestic league appearances and goals

Rodolfo Richardson Smith (born 24 February 1963, in San Pedro Sula) is a retired Honduran football midfielder.

== Club career ==
Smith began playing football in the Liga Nacional de Fútbol de Honduras with Marathón and Real España. He won the 1990–91 Honduran Liga Nacional title with Real España, scoring two goals in the final against Motagua.

In 1988, he moved abroad to play in Mexico with Correcaminos UAT. He would spend four seasons in the Mexican Primera División with Correcaminos and Club Universidad de Guadalajara. He also had a six-month spell with C.A. Peñarol in the Uruguayan Primera División.

== International career ==
Richardson Smith made his debut for Honduras in the 1980s and has earned over 30 caps, scoring 11 goals. He has represented his country in 15 FIFA World Cup qualification matches and played at the 1995 UNCAF Nations Cup.

He played as a defender in his last match, covering for an injury to Luis Pineda, in a 3–1 FIFA World Cup qualification loss against Mexico on 6 November 1996. He lost the ball on the edge of the area which led to a Mexico goal, and fans attacked his house in San Pedro Sula with stones and fireworks after the match. The incident prompted him to announce his retirement from the national team.

=== International goals ===
#	Date	Venue	Opponent	Score	Result	Competition
1.	8 November 1992	Estadio Nacional de Costa Rica (1924), San José, Costa Rica	Costa Rica	3-2	Win	1994 FIFA World Cup qualification
2.	28 November 1992	Estadio Tiburcio Carías Andino, Tegucigalpa, Honduras	Saint Vincent and the Grenadines	4-0	Win	1994 FIFA World Cup qualification
3.	4 April 1993	Estadio Tiburcio Carías Andino, Tegucigalpa, Honduras	Canada	2-2	Draw	1994 FIFA World Cup qualification
4.	27 March 1996	Estadio Marcelo Tinoco, Danlí, Honduras	Nicaragua	1-0	Win	Friendly
5.	4 August 1996	Estadio Nacional, San José, Costa Rica	Costa Rica	1-1	Draw	Friendly
6.	7 August 1996	Estadio Rommel Fernández, Panama City, Panama	Panama	2-1	Loss	Friendly
7.	28 August 1996	Estadio Francisco Morazán, San Pedro Sula, Honduras	Cuba	2-2	Draw	Friendly

== Managerial career ==
After retiring as a player, Richardson Smith was assistant-coach at several clubs and became manager of Municipal Valencia for the 2004 Apertura season. After spending time in the US as a youth team coach at Evergreen United and Juventus Strikers, he was named as possible manager of Deportes Savio in December 2012. As of August 2015, he was still working with children in the USA.

== Honours and awards ==
=== Club ===
C.D. Real Espana

- Liga Profesional de Honduras (2): 1990–91, 1993–94

C.D. Marathón

- Liga Profesional de Honduras (1): 1985–86

=== Country ===
Honduras

- Copa Centroamericana (1): 1995
