= Rónald González (Costa Rican footballer) =

Costa Rican footballer and manager (born 1970)

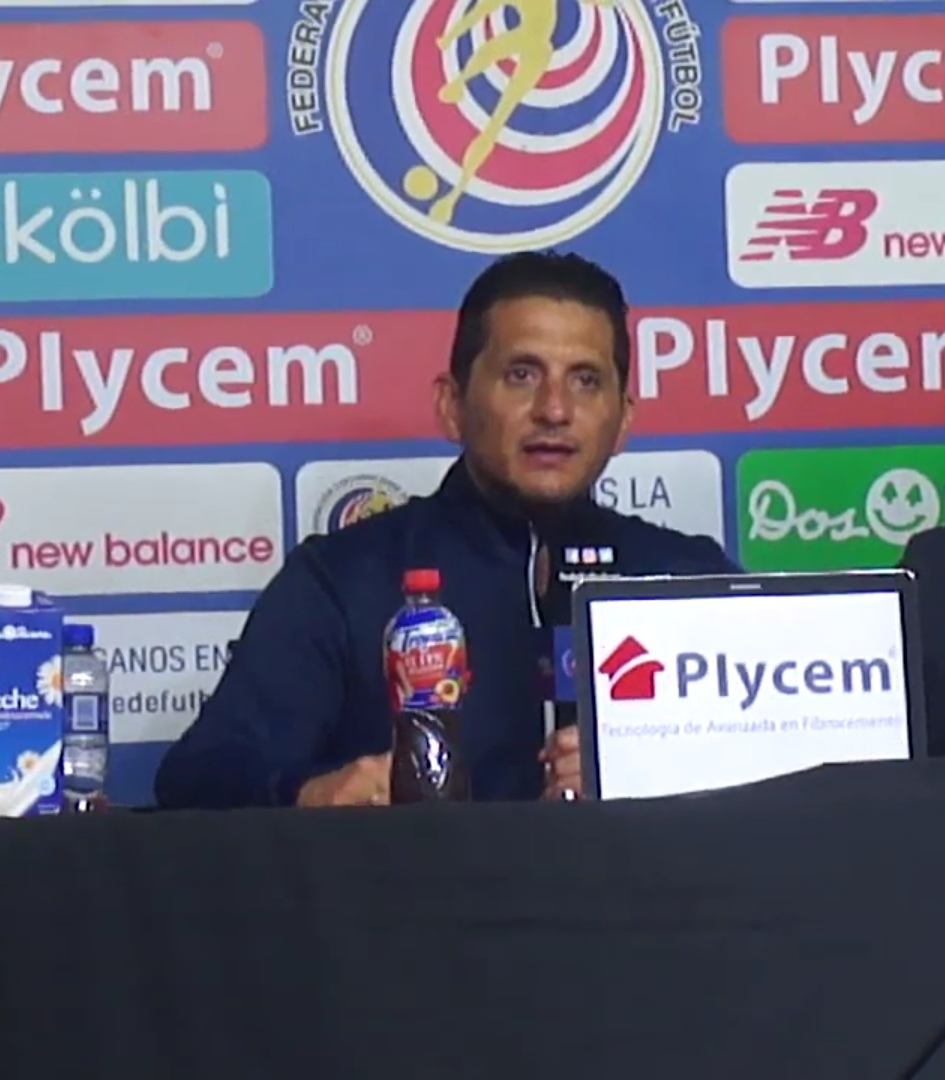

Personal information
- Full name: Rónald Alfonso González Brenes
- Date of birth: 8 August 1970 (age 56)
- Place of birth: San Carlos, Costa Rica
- Height: 1.81 m (5 ft 11 in)
- Position: Defender

Senior career*
Years	Team	Apps	(Gls)
1989–1990	Saprissa		
1990	Dinamo Zagreb	5	(0)
1991	Sturm Graz	0	(0)
1991	→ Vorwärts Steyr (loan)	11	(1)
1991–1998	Saprissa		
1998–2001	Comunicaciones		
2001–2003	Herediano		
2003–2006	Saprissa		

International career
1990–2000	Costa Rica	65	(5)

Managerial career
- 2008–2011: Costa Rica U20
- 2010: Costa Rica (caretaker)
- 2011: Costa Rica (caretaker)
- 2012: Comunicaciones
- 2013–2014: Saprissa
- 2016: Uruguay Coronado
- 2017–2018: Comunicaciones
- 2019–2021: Costa Rica
- 2023: Antigua
- 2024–2025: Comunicaciones
- * Club domestic league appearances and goals

Rónald Alfonso González Brenes (born 8 August 1970, in San Carlos) is a Costa Rican former professional footballer and manager. He was most recently the manager for Liga Nacional club Comunicaciones.

== Club career ==
González made his professional debut for Saprissa on 14 July 1989 against Uruguay de Coronado but left them to move abroad and play for Dinamo Zagreb in Yugoslavia. He also had a short spell on loan at Vorwärts Steyr in Austria. He returned to play for Saprissa and won almost everything he could pursue, as the team's captain. During the late 1990s and early 2000s, he starred for the Comunicaciones of Guatemala where he was captain and champion of the Guatemalan tournament several times as well. In his playing days with Saprissa, he won five national championships and three CONCACAF Champions Cup, and was part of the team that played in the 2005 FIFA Club World Championship, where Saprissa finished third behind São Paulo and Liverpool.

He played a total of 318 games for Saprissa, scoring 26 goals. He retired in October 2006.

== International career ==
He played for Costa Rica at the 1989 FIFA World Youth Championship in Saudi Arabia where he scored a goal against Colombia.

González made his senior debut for Costa Rica in a May 1990 warm-up match against Poland, just ahead of the 1990 FIFA World Cup in Italy. There, at 19 years of age, he scored a goal against Czechoslovakia, becoming the youngest player to score a goal in that World Cup. He earned a total of 65 caps, scoring 5 goals and represented his country in 19 FIFA World Cup qualification matches and at the 1991 CONCACAF Gold Cup as well as at the 1993 and 1997 UNCAF Nations Cups. Also, he was his country's captain during the 1997 Copa América and was a non-playing squad member at the 2001 Copa América.

His final international was an August 2000 friendly match against Venezuela.

=== International goals ===
Scores and results list Costa Rica's goal tally first.

No.	Date	Venue	Opponent	Score	Result	Competition
1.	23 June 1990	Stadio San Nicola, Bari, Italy	Czechoslovakia	1–1	1–4	1990 FIFA World Cup
2.	4 March 1992	Estadio Nacional de Costa Rica, San José, Costa Rica	El Salvador	2–0	2–0	Friendly
3.	15 November 1992	Arnos Vale Stadium, Kingstown, Saint Vincent and the Grenadines	Saint Vincent and the Grenadines	1–0	1–0	1994 FIFA World Cup qualification
4.	25 August 1996	Estadio Edgardo Baltodano Briceño, Liberia, Costa Rica	Chile	1–0	1–1	Friendly
5.	5 February 1997	Estadio Alejandro Morera Soto, Alajuela, Costa Rica	Slovakia	2–2	2–2	Friendly

== Managerial career ==
After retiring as a player, González took up coaching and was in charge of the Costa Rica national under-20 football team and acted as caretaker for the senior national team. In December 2011 he was announced as manager of his former club Comunicaciones. In December 2012, González was reported to leave Comunicaciones for Saprissa with whom he became the 61st Costa Rica league title winning manager in May 2014.

On Tuesday September 30, Saprissa announced that has cut González from managing the team.

== Managerial statistics ==
As of match played 9 June 2021

Managerial record by team and tenure
Team	From	To	Record					Ref.
Team	From	To	P	W	D	L	Win %	Ref.
Costa Rica	30 September 2019	10 June 2021	14	1	7	6	7.1	
Total			14	1	7	6	7.1	—

== Personal life ==
He is married to Yuliana Gaitán and they have two children.
