= Óscar Ulloa =

Salvadoran footballer (born 1963)

Óscar Ulloa sr.
Personal information
- Full name: Óscar Antonio Ulloa
- Date of birth: September 16, 1963 (age 63)
- Place of birth: El Salvador
- Position: Forward

Senior career*
Years	Team	Apps	(Gls)
1983	CESSA		
1993–1994	Alianza FC		
1995–1996	CD FAS		
1999	AD Isidro Metapán		

International career
1987–1993	El Salvador	31	(8)

Managerial career
- 2019: CD San Pablo Municipal
- * Club domestic league appearances and goals

Óscar Antonio Ulloa (born 16 September 1963) is a retired Salvadoran professional football player.

== Club career ==
Nicknamed el Lagarto (the Lizard), the moustached Ulloa has played for Alianza, Isidro Metapán and FAS among others, winning league titles with Alianza and FAS.

== International career ==
Ulloa made his debut for El Salvador in an August 1987 Pan American Games match against Trinidad & Tobago and has earned a total of 31 caps, scoring 8 goals. He has represented his country in 11 FIFA World Cup qualification matches (in which he scored six) as well as at the 1991 and 1993 UNCAF Nations Cups.

His final international was a May 1993 FIFA World Cup qualification match against Honduras.

=== International goals ===
Scores and results list El Salvador's goal tally first.

#	Date	Venue	Opponent	Score	Result	Competition
1	29 April 1992	Estadio Cuscatlán, San Salvador, El Salvador	Costa Rica	1-0	1-1	Friendly match
2	19 July 1992	Estadio Rigoberto López, Managua, Nicaragua	Nicaragua	4-0	5-0	1994 FIFA World Cup qualification
3	23 July 1992	Estadio Cuscatlán, San Salvador, El Salvador	Nicaragua	5-1	5-1	1994 FIFA World Cup qualification
4	26 July 1992	Estadio Cuscatlán, San Salvador, El Salvador	Mexico	1-2	1-2	Friendly match
5	8 November 1992	Swangard Stadium, Burnaby, Canada	Canada	2-1	3-2	1994 FIFA World Cup qualification
6	8 November 1992	Swangard Stadium, Burnaby, Canada	Canada	3-2	3-2	1994 FIFA World Cup qualification
7	18 April 1993	Estadio Azteca, Mexico City, Mexico	Mexico	1-3	1-3	1994 FIFA World Cup qualification
8	9 May 1993	Estadio Cuscatlán, San Salvador, El Salvador	Honduras	2-0	2-1	1994 FIFA World Cup qualification

== Personal life ==
Ulloa is the father of current Salvadoran league players Óscar Ulloa and Ricardo Ulloa who both play for FAS.
