= Arnold Cruz =

Honduran footballer (born 1970)

Personal information
- Full name: Arnold Javier Cruz Argueta
- Date of birth: 22 December 1970 (age 55)
- Place of birth: El Progreso, Honduras
- Height: 1.82 m (6 ft 0 in)
- Position: Defender

Senior career*
Years	Team	Apps	(Gls)
1989–1994	Olimpia		
1994–1995	UA Tamaulipas	26	(3)
1995–1996	Toluca	21	(0)
1996–1997	Atlético Morelia	9	(0)
1997	D.C. United	5	(0)
1997	San Jose Clash	20	(0)
1998	Platense		
1999	Olimpia		
2000	Chacarita Juniors	13	(0)
2000–2001	Olimpia		
2001	Universidad		
2002–2003	Cartaginés	67	
2004–2005	Águila		
2005–2007	Olimpia		
2007–2008	Platense	18	

International career^{‡}
1991–2003	Honduras	50	(3)

Managerial career
- 2008: Platense (assistant)
- 2013–2014: UPNFM
- * Club domestic league appearances and goals as of 2007 ‡ National team caps and goals as of 2000

Arnold Javier Cruz Argueta (born 22 December 1970) is a retired Honduran football defender. He currently is manager of second division side UPNFM.

== Club career ==
Nicknamed Chele, Cruz started his professional career at Olimpia before moving abroad to join compatriot César Obando at Mexican outfit UA Tamaulipas. He then played for fellow Mexicans Toluca and Morelia and joined Major League Soccer in 1997, where he would turn out for D.C. United and San Jose Clash. The much-travelled defender enjoyed a season in Argentinian football with Chacarita Juniors in between two more spells with Olimpia and played for Costa Rican side Cartaginés and the Salvadorans of Águila.

He finally returned to Honduras and Olimpia in 2005 and finished his career at Platense in Liga Nacional de Honduras.

== International career ==
Cruz made his debut for Honduras in a May 1991 UNCAF Nations Cup match against Panama and has earned a total of 50 caps, scoring 3 goals. He has represented his country in 18 FIFA World Cup qualification matches and played at the 1991, 1993, 1995 and 2003 UNCAF Nations Cups as well as at the 1991, 1996 and 1998 CONCACAF Gold Cups.

His final international was a June 2003 friendly match against Venezuela.

=== International goals ===
Scores and results list Honduras' goal tally first.

N.	Date	Venue	Opponent	Score	Result	Competition
1.	22 September 1992	Estadio Nacional, Tegucigalpa, Honduras	Jamaica	4–1	5–1	Friendly match
2.	17 November 1996	Estadio Francisco Morazán, San Pedro Sula, Honduras	Saint Vincent and the Grenadines	3–0	11–3	1998 FIFA World Cup qualification
3.	20 August 2000	New York City, USA	Haiti	2–0	4–0	Friendly match

== Retirement ==
He retired in 2008 and became assistant coach for Nahúm Espinoza at Platense. In 2011, he worked for a Youth Institution of the Honduran government. He became manager of UPNFM for the 2013 Clausura.

== Honours and awards ==
=== Club ===
C.D. Olimpia

- Liga Profesional de Honduras (1): 1992–93

=== Country ===
Honduras

- Copa Centroamericana (2): 1993, 1995
