= Mario Mayén Meza =

Salvadoran footballer

Personal information
- Full name: Mario Ernesto Mayén Meza
- Date of birth: May 19, 1978 (age 48)
- Place of birth: La Libertad, El Salvador
- Position: Defender

Youth career
- 1987: FAS

Senior career*
Years	Team	Apps	(Gls)
1988–1995	Alianza		
1995–1999	FAS		
1999–2002	Águila		
2002–2004	San Salvador F.C.		

International career^{‡}
1991–1998	El Salvador	36	(0)

Managerial career
- 2007: San Salvador F.C. (assistant)
- 2008: Fuerte San Francisco
- Luis Ángel Firpo (assistant)
- 2011: Águila (assistant)
- 2020: Águila (assistant)
- 2020: Águila (director of football)
- * Club domestic league appearances and goals as of November 28, 2020 ‡ National team caps and goals as of November 28, 2020

Mario Ernesto Mayén Meza (born 19 May 1968) is a retired Salvadoran professional footballer.

== Club career ==
Mayén Meza has played for three of the 'Big Four' of Salvadoran football: Alianza, FAS and Águila. He finished his career at San Salvador F.C., with whom he won their first league title.

== International career ==
Nicknamed el Negro, Mayén made his debut for El Salvador in an April 1991 UNCAF Nations Cup qualification match against Nicaragua and has earned a total of 36 caps, scoring no goals. He has represented his country in 6 FIFA World Cup qualification matches and played at the 1991, 1993, 1995 and 1997 UNCAF Nations Cups as well as at the 1996 CONCACAF Gold Cup

His final international match was a May 1997 World Cup qualification match against Jamaica.

== Retirement ==
Formally, his name is Meza Mayén instead of Mayén Meza because his father's name is Meza. He was also nicknamed el Tiburón (the Shark), since he used to smell like fish at the training ground after first helping his mother in her fish shops. He now runs his own seafood business in La Libertad and has been an assistant coach with San Salvador F.C., where he was dismissed in April 2007, Luis Ángel Firpo and Águila.
