= Nicolás Suazo =

Honduran footballer (born 1965)

Personal information
- Full name: Nicolás Suazo Velásquez
- Date of birth: 9 January 1965 (age 61)
- Place of birth: San Pedro Sula, Honduras
- Height: 1.72 m (5 ft 8 in)
- Position: Striker

Senior career*
Years	Team	Apps	(Gls)
1984–1989	Independiente Villela		
1989–1995	Marathón	95	(42)
1994–1996	Herediano	84	(43)
1997–1999	Comunicaciones		(10)
1999	USAC		
2000	Victoria		(6)

International career
1991–1998	Honduras	51	(28)

Managerial career
- 2004–2005: Marathón
- 2009–2011: Marathón
- * Club domestic league appearances and goals

Nicolás Suazo Velásquez (born 9 January 1965) is a Honduran retired professional footballer who played as a striker.

== Club career ==
Nicknamed Nicogol because of his prolific goalscoring, Suazo played in Honduras for Independiente, Marathón and Victoria, in Costa Rica for Herediano alongside compatriot Danilo Galindo and for Comunicaciones and USAC in Guatemala.

He scored 48 goals in total in the Honduran National League and still is the most prolific Honduran in de Costa Rican league with 46.

== International career ==
Suazo made his debut for Honduras in a May 1991 UNCAF Nations Cup match against Panama and has earned a total of 51 caps, scoring 28 goals. He has represented his country in 15 FIFA World Cup qualification matches and played at the 1991, 1993, and 1995 UNCAF Nations Cups as well as at the 1993 CONCACAF Gold Cup. He was top goalscorer at the 1993 UNCAF Cup with five goals.

His final international was a November 1998 friendly match against El Salvador.

== Managerial career ==
After his playing career ended, he has been rather successful as a coach. He won one championships in Honduras with C.D. Marathón.

== Personal life ==
His parents are Nicolás Suazo and Josefina Velásquez and he is the brother of footballer David Suazo. He is also Maynor Suazo cousin.

== Career statistics ==
#	Date	Venue	Opponent	Score	Result	Competition
1.	30 June 1992	San Pedro Sula, Honduras	Panama	4–0	Win	Friendly
2.	30 June 1992	San Pedro Sula, Honduras	Panama	4–0	Win	Friendly
3.	26 July 1992	Tegucigalpa, Honduras	Guatemala	2–0	Win	World Cup 1994 Qualifier
4.	18 September 1992	San Pedro Sula, Honduras	El Salvador	1–1	Win	Friendly
5.	22 September 1992	San Pedro Sula, Honduras	Jamaica	5–1	Win	Friendly
6.	24 September 1992	San Pedro Sula, Honduras	Jamaica	7–0	Win	Friendly
7.	22 November 1992	Kingstown, Saint Vincent and the Grenadines	Saint Vincent and the Grenadines	4–0	Win	World Cup 1994 Qualifier
8.	13 December 1992	Tegucigalpa, Honduras	Mexico	1–1	Draw	World Cup 1994 Qualifier
9.	29 January 1993	Cochabamba, Bolivia	Bolivia	1-3	Loss	Friendly
10.	5 March 1993	Tegucigalpa, Honduras	Panama	2–0	Win	UNCAF Nations Cup 1993
11.	7 March 1993	Tegucigalpa, Honduras	Costa Rica	2–0	Win	UNCAF Nations Cup 1993
12.	9 March 1993	Tegucigalpa, Honduras	El Salvador	3–0	Win	UNCAF Nations Cup 1993
13.	9 March 1993	Tegucigalpa, Honduras	El Salvador	3–0	Win	UNCAF Nations Cup 1993
14.	9 March 1993	Tegucigalpa, Honduras	El Salvador	3–0	Win	UNCAF Nations Cup 1993
15.	25 March 1993	San Pedro Sula, Honduras	United States	4–1	Win	Friendly
16.	25 March 1993	San Pedro Sula, Honduras	United States	4–1	Win	Friendly
17.	3 May 1994	Miami, United States	El Salvador	1–3	Loss	Miami Cup
18.	5 May 1994	Miami, United States	Peru	2–1	Win	Miami Cup
19.	11 December 1994	Fullerton, California, United States	United States	1–1	Draw	Friendly
20.	3 December 1995	Santa Ana, El Salvador	Guatemala	2–0	Win	UNCAF Nations Cup 1995
21.	14 August 1996	San Pedro Sula, Honduras	El Salvador	2–1	Win	Friendly
22.	14 August 1996	San Pedro Sula, Honduras	El Salvador	2–1	Win	Friendly
23.	18 August 1996	Los Angeles, United States	Guatemala	1–1	Draw	Friendly
24.	13 October 1996	Kingstown, Saint Vincent and the Grenadines	Saint Vincent and the Grenadines	4–1	Win	World Cup 1998 Qualifier
25.	13 October 1996	Kingstown, Saint Vincent and the Grenadines	Saint Vincent and the Grenadines	4–1	Win	World Cup 1998 Qualifier
26.	17 November 1996	San Pedro Sula, Honduras	Saint Vincent and the Grenadines	11–3	Win	World Cup 1998 Qualifier
27.	17 November 1996	San Pedro Sula, Honduras	Saint Vincent and the Grenadines	11–3	Win	World Cup 1998 Qualifier
28.	17 November 1996	San Pedro Sula, Honduras	Saint Vincent and the Grenadines	11–3	Win	World Cup 1998 Qualifier

== Honours ==
=== Player ===
C.D. Marathón

- Honduran Cup: (1): 1994

C.S.D. Comunicaciones

- Liga Nacional de Fútbol de Guatemala (1): 1997–98

Honduras

- Copa Centroamericana (2): 1993, 1995

=== Manager ===
C.D. Marathón

- Liga Nacional de Fútbol de Honduras: (1): 2004–05 A
