= Floyd Guthrie =

Costa Rican football player (born 1966)

Personal information
- Full name: Floyd Anthony Guthrie Bell
- Date of birth: 14 March 1966 (age 60)
- Place of birth: Limón, Costa Rica
- Height: 1.77 m (5 ft 9 1/2 in)
- Positions: Striker; defender; midfielder

Senior career*
Years	Team	Apps	(Gls)
1984–1987	Uruguay de Coronado		
1987–1990	Herediano		
1990–1994	Municipal Turrialba		
1994–1996	Victoria		
1995–1996	→ UA Tamaulipas (loan)		
1996	→ Luis Ángel Firpo (loan)		
1997–2001	Comunicaciones		
2001–2002	Herediano		
2002	Pérez Zeledón		
2003–2004	Antigua		
2004–2005	Suchitepéquez		
2005–2006	Petapa		

International career^{‡}
1991–1998	Costa Rica	33	(3)
- * Club domestic league appearances and goals ‡ National team caps and goals as of 1 April 2015

Floyd Anthony Guthrie Bell (born 14 March 1966) is a Guatemalan-Costa Rican retired footballer who has played as a defender, midfielder and forward.

== Club career ==
A versatile player, Limón-born Guthrie started his career at Uruguay de Coronado and also played for Herediano and Municipal Turrialba in Costa Rica before moving abroad.

He had spells in Honduras with Victoria, in El Salvador with Luis Ángel Firpo, in Mexico with UA Tamaulipas but spent the majority of his career abroad in Guatemala, playing for Comunicaciones, Antigua, Suchitepéquez and Petapa.

In March 2001, Guthrie returned to Herediano and later played for Pérez Zeledón before moving back to Guatemala. Guthrie has become a Guatemalan citizen.

== International career ==
Guthrie made his debut for Costa Rica in an April 1991 friendly match against Mexico and earned a total of 33 caps, scoring 3 goals. He has represented his country in 4 FIFA World Cup qualification matches and played at the 1991, 1993 and 1995 UNCAF Nations Cups as well as at the 1991, 1993 and 1998 CONCACAF Gold Cups.

His final international match was a February 1998 CONCACAF Gold Cup match against the United States.

== Personal life ==
Guthrie is married to Waleska Loaiza.
