= 1993 UNCAF Nations Cup =

Tournament details
- Host country: Honduras
- Dates: 16 February – 9 March
- Teams: 5 (from 1 sub-confederation)

Final positions
- Champions: Honduras (1st title)
- Runners-up: Costa Rica
- Third place: Panama
- Fourth place: El Salvador

Tournament statistics
- Matches played: 8
- Goals scored: 20 (2.5 per match)
- Top scorer(s): (Honduras) Nicolas Suazo (5 goals)

The 1993 UNCAF Nations Cup was the second edition of the UNCAF Nations Cup, the football championship of Unión Centroamericana de Fútbol (UNCAF).

== Preliminary round ==
16 February 1993

Costa Rica	6–0	Nicaragua

Costa Rica
19 February 1993

Nicaragua	0–2	Costa Rica

Nicaragua
17 February 1993

Panama	w/o	Guatemala

Panama

Guatemala withdrew from the tournament, due to the unexpected resignation of coach Migue Ángel Bridinsi and the lack of cooperation of the teams with providing the players from the series, so Panama qualified automatically.

== Participating teams ==
4 UNCAF teams participated in the tournament

- Costa Rica
- El Salvador
- Honduras (Hosts)
- Panama (Preliminary round) winners

== Squads ==
For a complete list of all participating squads see 1993 UNCAF Nations Cup squads

== Stadium ==
1993 UNCAF Nations Cup is located in Honduras	Tegucigalpa
1993 UNCAF Nations Cup is located in Honduras	Estadio Tiburcio Carías Andino
1993 UNCAF Nations Cup is located in Honduras	Capacity: 35,000

== Group stage ==
All matches were played in Tegucigalpa, Honduras

Team	Pld	W	D	L	GF	GA	GD	Pts
Honduras	3	3	0	0	7	0	+7	6
Costa Rica	3	2	0	1	3	2	+1	4
Panama	3	0	1	2	1	5	-4	1
El Salvador	3	0	1	2	1	5	-4	1

5 March 1993
CST
Day 1

Costa Rica	1–0	El Salvador
Gómez 67'

Estadio Tiburcio Carías Andino, Tegucigalpa
5 March 1993
CST
Day 1

Honduras	2–0	Panama
Castro 11'; Suazo 82'

Estadio Tiburcio Carías Andino, Tegucigalpa

7 March 1993
CST
Day 2

El Salvador	1–1	Panama
Díaz 48'		Ortega 83'

Estadio Tiburcio Carías Andino, Tegucigalpa
7 March 1993
CST
Day 2

Honduras	2–0	Costa Rica
Suazo 53'; Cálix 56'

Estadio Tiburcio Carías Andino, Tegucigalpa

9 March 1993
CST
Day 3

Costa Rica	2–0	Panama
Guthrie 6'; Fonseca 21'

Estadio Tiburcio Carías Andino, Tegucigalpa
9 March 1993
CST
Day 3

Honduras	3–0	El Salvador
Suazo 35', 43', 79'

Estadio Tiburcio Carías Andino, Tegucigalpa

== Champions ==
1993 UNCAF Nations Cup winner

Honduras
First title

- Honduras, Costa Rica, and Panama qualified automatically for 1993 CONCACAF Gold Cup.

== Top scorers ==
5 goals

- (Honduras) Nicolas Suazo

3 goals

- (Costa Rica) Rónald Gómez

2 goals

- (Costa Rica) Javier Astúa
- (Costa Rica) Germán Rodríguez

== Best XI of the Tournament ==
Name	Position	Team
Erick Lonnis	Goalkeeper	Costa Rica
Arnold Cruz	Defender	Honduras
Gilberto Yearwood	Defender	Honduras
Rónald González Brenes	Defender	Costa Rica
Leonel Carcamo	Defender	El Salvador
Frank Losada	Midfielder	Panama
José Guillermo Rivera	Midfielder	El Salvador
Luis Enrique Calix	Midfielder	Honduras
Kenneth Paniagua	Midfielder	Costa Rica
Nicolas Suazo	Forward	Honduras
Dolmo Flores	Forward	Honduras
