= A.D. Turrialba =

Costa Rican football club

Turrialba
- Full name: Asociación Deportiva Municipal Turrialba Club de Fútbol
- Nickname: Los Azucareros
- Founded: 28 September 1940; 85 years ago
- Ground: Estadio Rafael Ángel Camacho, Turrialba
- Capacity: 4,500
- President: Carlos Rojas Quirós
- Manager: Marvin Solano
- League: Liga de Ascenso
- Apertura 2023: 8° - Group B
Home colours	Away colours

Asociación Deportiva Municipal Turrialba Club de Fútbol is a Costa Rican football club, that currently plays in the Costa Rican Liga de Ascenso.

== History ==
Founded in 1940, Turrialba made it to the Segunda División in 1964 and won promotion to the Primera División in 1965. During the 1960s and 1970s they were known as a yo-yo club, changing divisions frequently. Their most recent spell in the Primera División was between 1991 and 1997, when they were relegated after a 1–0 defeat by Puntarenas. Since its foundation, it has been named Turrialba FC, Asociación Deportiva Turrialba and Municipal Turrialba. They have totalled 16 seasons in the top tier.

In December 2014, former Cartaginés chairman Thelvin Cabezas acquired the Turrialba franchise in a bid to lead the club back to the Primera División. They were renamed Turrialba F.C. and Uruguayan Carlos del Toro was named as manager.

== Stadium ==
Municipal Turrialba plays its home games at the Rafael Ángel Camacho Cordero stadium, which is located in the central district of the canton of Turrialba.

The property is municipal property and is under the administration of the Cantonal Sports and Recreation Committee of Turrialba.

It bears that name in honor of a great sports leader from the Turrialba canton.

== Honours ==
=== National ===
- Segunda División de Costa Rica: 4

1964, 1969, 1972, 1974

== Current squad ==
As of June 7, 2023

Note: Flags indicate national team as defined under FIFA eligibility rules; some limited exceptions apply. Players may hold more than one non-FIFA nationality.

No.	Pos.	Nation	Player
2	DF	CRC	Joshua Francis
3	DF	CRC	Yabran Morales
4	DF	CRC	Michael Gamboa
5	FW	CRC	Hansell Arauz
6	MF	CRC	Jason Correa
7	FW	CRC	Carlos Elizondo
8	DF	CRC	Kevin Pereira (Captain)
9	FW	CRC	Esteban Muñoz
14	DF	CRC	Miguel Navarro

No.	Pos.	Nation	Player
17	DF	CRC	Kevin Díaz
21	DF	CRC	Julius Avila
22	MF	CRC	Fernando Vilchez
23	DF	CRC	Carlos Fonseca
26	FW	CRC	Jesus Chaves
27	MF	CRC	Juan Pablo Fallas
70	FW	CRC	John Vizcaíno
77	FW	CRC	William Blanco
—	MF	CRC	Bryan Sánchez
