= 1991–92 Honduran Liga Nacional =

Liga Nacional
- Season: 1991–92
- Champions: Motagua (5th)
- Relegated: Atlético Indio
- CONCACAF Champions' Cup: Motagua; Real España
- Matches: 157
- Goals: 349 (2.22 per match)
- Top goalscorer: Bennett (12)
- All statistics correct as of 5 March 1992.

The 1991–92 Honduran Liga Nacional season was the 26th edition of the Honduran Liga Nacional. The format of the tournament was the same as the 1990-91 season and a rematch of the final. C.D. Motagua successfully defended its 1990-91 title in the final against Real C.D. España. Both the title holder and the runner-up qualified for berths to the 1992 CONCACAF Champions' Cup.

== 1991–92 teams ==
- Atlético Indio (Tegucigalpa, promoted)
- C.D. Marathón (San Pedro Sula)
- C.D. Motagua (Tegucigalpa)
- C.D. Olimpia (Tegucigalpa)
- C.D. Petrotela (Tela)
- C.D. Platense (Puerto Cortés)
- Real C.D. España (San Pedro Sula)
- Sula (La Lima)
- C.D. Victoria (La Ceiba)
- C.D.S. Vida (La Ceiba)
- Platense played their home games at Estadio Francisco Morazán due to renovations at Estadio Excélsior.

== Regular season ==
=== Standings ===
Pos	Team	Pld	W	D	L	GF	GA	GD	Pts	Qualification or relegation
1	Motagua (Note: Motagua clinched first spot as regular season winner.)	27	16	5	6	38	19	+19	37	Qualified to the Final round (Note: Top 5 qualified to the Final round.)
2	Real España	27	14	7	6	37	23	+14	35	Qualified to the Final round
3	Olimpia	27	14	4	9	39	23	+16	32	Qualified to the Final round
4	Marathón	27	9	10	8	32	27	+5	28	Qualified to the Final round
5	Platense	27	8	11	8	27	28	−1	27	Qualified to the Final round
6	Victoria	27	9	8	10	29	28	+1	26	
7	Vida	27	7	10	10	22	31	−9	24	
8	Petrotela	27	5	14	8	23	35	−12	24	
9	Sula	27	5	9	13	24	39	−15	19	
10	Atlético Indio	27	2	14	11	19	37	−18	18	Relegated to Segunda División (Note: Atlético Indio relegated.)

== Final round ==
=== Pentagonal standings ===
Pos	Team	Pld	W	D	L	GF	GA	GD	Pts	Qualification or relegation
1	Real España	8	6	1	1	15	5	+10	13	Qualified to the Final (Note: Real España qualified to the Final as winner of Pentagonal.)
2	Olimpia	8	5	1	2	18	9	+9	11	
3	Platense	8	2	3	3	10	13	−3	7	
4	Marathón	8	2	3	3	12	17	−5	7	
5	Motagua	8	0	2	6	3	14	−11	2	

=== Final ===
29 February 1992 1st leg	Real España	0–0	Motagua	San Pedro Sula, Cortés
19:30 CST				Stadium: Estadio Francisco Morazán; Referee: Amílcar Burgos

Real España	Motagua

5 March 1992 1st leg	Motagua	1–0	Real España	Tegucigalpa, Francisco Morazán
19:30 CST	Ávila 63'			Stadium: Estadio Tiburcio Carías Andino; Attendance: 32,299; Referee: Gonzalo Tejada

Motagua	Real España

GK	–	(Honduras) Marvin Henríquez
RB	–	(Honduras) Patrocinio Sierra
CB	–	(Honduras) Javier Padilla
CB	–	(Honduras) Mateo Ávila
LB	–	(Honduras) Hernaín Arzú	Substituted off
CM	6	(Honduras) Donaldo Reyes
CM	–	(Honduras) Óscar Murillo
RM	–	(Honduras) Fabricio Pérez
LM	–	(Peru) Miguel Seminario	Substituted off
CF	–	(Honduras) Álex Ávila
CF	–	(Honduras) César Obando
Substitutions:
DF	13	(Honduras) Edgar Sierra	Substituted on
FW	14	(Honduras) Geovanny Castro	Substituted on
Manager:
(Honduras) Ángel Rodríguez

GK	–	(Honduras) Wilmer Cruz
RB	–	(Honduras) Marco Anariba
CB	–	(Honduras) Juan Castro
CB	–	(Honduras) Karl Roland
LB	–	(Honduras) Emilson Soto
DM	–	(Honduras) José Fúnez
RM	–	(Honduras) Marco Ortega
LM	–	(Uruguay) Washington Hernández	Substituted off
RW	–	(Honduras) Ciro Castillo
CF	–	(Honduras) Luis Vallejo
LW	–	(Honduras) Nahamán González
Substitutions:
MF	8	(Honduras) Camilo Bonilla	Substituted on
MF	–	(Honduras) Erick Gallegos	Substituted on
Manager:
(El Salvador) Óscar Emigdio Benítez

- Motagua won 1–0 on aggregate score.

Liga Nacional
1991–92 Champion
C.D. Motagua
5th title

== Top scorer ==
- (Honduras) Eduardo Bennett (Olimpia) with 12 goals

== Squads ==
Atlético Indio
(Honduras) Arnold Vladimir López	(Honduras) Edwin Ponce	(Honduras) Danery Berrios
(Honduras) Cesilio "Chilo" Amaya	(Paraguay) Eduardo, Rinaldi	(Honduras) Juan "Pelon" Flores
(Honduras) Julio Cesar Ortega	(Honduras) Oscar Murillo	(Honduras) Jose Valladares
(Honduras) Geremias "Burrito" Gonzalez	(Honduras) Eloy Molina	(Honduras) Mariano. Crisanto
(Honduras) Rogelio. Enamorado	(Honduras) Ambrosio Rochez	(Honduras) Prudencio "Tekate" Norales
(Honduras) Johnatan. Escalante	(Honduras) Victor Rutilio Mercadal	(Honduras) Jose "Leli" Guevara
Marathón
(Honduras) Dangelo Daltino Bautista	(Honduras) Alfredo, Flores	(Honduras) José Luis "Joche" Alvarado
(Honduras) Walter "Gualala" Trejo	(Honduras) Juan. Gómez Ortiz	(Uruguay) Fernando. Ferreira
(Honduras) Bayron. Suazo	(Honduras) Rolando Padilla	(Honduras) Marco. Antonio García
(Honduras) Carlos Orlando Caballero	(Paraguay) Luis Cornet	(Honduras) Leonel. Machado
(Honduras) José Ulloa Villatoro	(Uruguay) Rubén. Baeque	(Honduras) Nicolás Suazo Velásquez
(Honduras) Geovany. Morán	(Honduras) Henry Guevara	(Honduras) José Luis "Joche" Alvarado
(Honduras) Neptaly Turcios	(Honduras) Mauro Pacheco
Motagua
(Honduras) Marvin Geovany "Mango" Henríquez	(Honduras) Carlos Augusto Solís	(Honduras) Alex Geovany Ávila
(Honduras) Patrocinio Sierra Doblado	(Peru) Miguel Armando Seminario	(Honduras) José "Panterita" Mejía
(Honduras) Pablo Martínez	(Honduras) Carlos Matamoros	(Honduras) Edgar Sierra
(Honduras) Mario Fernández Norales	(Brazil) Miguel Texeira	(Honduras) Jorge Flores
(Honduras) Óscar Murillo	(Uruguay) Vicente Viera	(Honduras) German "Ñato" Rodríguez
(Uruguay) Juan Ferreira	(Honduras) César Augusto "Nene" Obando	(Honduras) Fabricio Pérez
(Honduras) Giovanni "Venado" Castro	(Honduras) Saturnino Norales Arzú	(Uruguay) Juan Carlos "Rata" Contreras
(Honduras) Hernaín Arzú	(Honduras) Donaldo Reyes Guillén	(Honduras) Iván Ponce
(Honduras) Juan "Ninja" Padilla Bardales	(Honduras) David Pereira	(Honduras) Pedro Martínez
(Honduras) Marlon Núñez	(Honduras) Ramón "Monchín" Rodríguez	(Honduras) Mateo Ávila Benedict
(Honduras) Ramón Romero "Romerito"	(Honduras) Alex Alaniz	(Uruguay) Julio Tejeda
Olimpia
(Honduras) Belarmino Rivera	(Honduras) Eduardo "Balín" Bennett	(Uruguay) Carlos José Laje Moreno
(Honduras) Arnold Cruz	(Honduras) Danilo "Pollo" Galindo	(Honduras) Alex Pineda Chacón
(Honduras) Rudy Alberto Williams	(Honduras) Juan Carlos Espinoza	(Honduras) Fernando Tovar Durón
(Honduras) Dennis Antonio Piedy	(Brazil) Denilson Costa de Oliveira	(Honduras) Nahúm Alberto Espinoza Zerón
(Honduras) Erick Darío Fú Lanza	(Honduras) José Antonio "Flaco" Hernández	(Honduras) Gilberto Gerónimo Yearwood
(Honduras) Wilmer Neal "Matador" Velásquez	(Honduras) Óscar Gerardo "Maradona" Cruz
Petrotela
(Honduras) Golbin Bonilla	(Honduras) Raúl Centeno Gamboa
Platense
(Honduras) Anthony Hinds Mathews	(Honduras) Rossel Cacho	(Honduras) Mauricio Edgardo Figueroa
(Honduras) Jorge Arita Neals
Real España
(Honduras) Wilmer Enrique "Supermán" Cruz	(Honduras) José Mauricio "Guicho" Fúnez Barrientos	(Honduras) Juan Ramón "Montuca" Castro
(Honduras) Ciro Paulino "Palic" Castillo	(Honduras) Nahamán Humberto González	(Honduras) Edith Hernando Contreras
(Honduras) Karl Antonio Roland	(Honduras) Víctor Martín Castro	(Honduras) José Luis "Pili" Aguirre
(Honduras) Norman "Tedy" Martínez	(Honduras) Luis Orlando "Caralampio" Vallejo Arguijo	(Honduras) Edgardo Emilson Soto Fajardo
(Honduras) Erick Gerardo Gallegos	(Honduras) Marco Vinicio "Chacal" Ortega	(Uruguay) Washington Leonardo "Piojo" Hernández
(Honduras) Marco Antonio Anariba Zepeda	(Honduras) Carlos Fernando Landa	(Honduras) José Luis López Escobar
(Honduras) Camilo Bonilla Paz	(Honduras) Luis Arriola Carter
Sula
(Argentina) Sergio Rubén Busciglio	(Honduras) Víctor Hernán Duarte
Victoria
(Honduras) Carlos Roberto "Condorito" Mejía Alvarenga	(Honduras) Jorge Alberto "Bala" Bennett	(Honduras) Enrique Reneau
(Honduras) Renán "Chimbo" Aguilera Contreras
Vida
(Honduras) Carlos Ramírez	(Honduras) Rudy Pine Pack	(Honduras) Wilson Omar Reyes Martínez
(Honduras) Roy Arturo Padilla Bardales	(Honduras) René Arturo David "Pupa" Martínez	(Honduras) Jorge Ernesto Pineda

== Known results ==
=== Week 1 ===
13 April 1991	Real España	2–1	Atlético Indio	San Pedro Sula
			López	Stadium: Estadio General Francisco Morazán

14 April 1991	Victoria	3–5	Olimpia	La Ceiba
	Márquez; Buchanan		Bennett; Espinoza	Stadium: Estadio Nilmo Edwards

=== Week 3 ===
28 April 1991	Vida	2–1	Olimpia	La Ceiba
				Stadium: Estadio Nilmo Edwards

=== Week 10 ===
18 July 1991	Olimpia	v	Victoria	Tegucigalpa
				Stadium: Estadio Tiburcio Carías Andino
Note: Olimpia didn't show up

=== Pentagonal ===
1992-01-04

Real España	2–0	Olimpia
Vallejo; Castillo

San Pedro Sula
1992-01-05

Motagua	1–1	Marathón
Castro		Ferreira

Tegucigalpa
1992-01-11

Platense	2–2	Olimpia

San Pedro Sula
1992-01-12

Motagua	1–3	Real España

Tegucigalpa
1992-01-15

Marathón	1–1	Real España
Cornet		Ortega

San Pedro Sula
1992-01-23

Olimpia	2–0	Motagua
Cruz; Velásquez

Tegucigalpa
1992-01-26

Olimpia	1–3	Marathón
Costa		Baeque; Ferreira; N. Suazo

Tegucigalpa
1992-01-29

Platense	2–0	Motagua
Mathews; Figueroa

San Pedro Sula
1992-02-01

Marathón	2–1	Motagua
Cornet; Suazo		Romero

San Pedro Sula
1992-02-02

Olimpia	2–0	Real España
Piedy; Costa

Tegucigalpa
1992-02-12

Real España	3–0	Motagua

San Pedro Sula
1992-02-15

Real España	1–0	Marathón
Anariba

San Pedro Sula
1992-02-16

Motagua	0–1	Olimpia
		Cruz

Tegucigalpa
1992-02-22

Marathón	2–7	Olimpia
Ferreira 62' (pen.); Trejo 75'		Espinoza 36' 87'; Chacón 48' 58'; Galindo 51'; Costa 59'; Cruz 70'

San Pedro Sula
Attendance: 2,223
Referee: Arturo Tábora
1992-02-23

Motagua	0–0	Platense

Tegucigalpa

Olimpia	3–0	Platense

Tegucigalpa

=== Unknown rounds ===
17 April 1991

Platense	0–1	Victoria
		Flores

San Pedro Sula
25 April 1991

Motagua	3–1	Atlético Indio
Castro; Obando		Molina

Tegucigalpa
9 June 1991

Tela Timsa	0–3	Real España

Tela
8 August 1991

Atlético Indio	1–1	Motagua
Crisanto		Castro

Tegucigalpa
18 August 1991

Sula	5–1	Victoria

La Lima
26 August 1991

Sula	0–1	Olimpia
		Yearwood

La Lima
5 September 1991

Olimpia	1–2	Real España
		Hernández

Tegucigalpa
22 September 1991

Victoria	2–0	Marathón

La Ceiba
22 September 1991

Motagua	2–0	Real España
Seminario

Tegucigalpa
29 September 1991

Sula	0–1	Olimpia
		Costa 17'

La Lima
29 September 1991

Motagua	2–1	Vida

Tegucigalpa
6 October 1991

Súper Estrella	4–2	Real España

Danlí
6 October 1991

Motagua	1–0	Olimpia
Seminario

Tegucigalpa
27 October 1991

Motagua	0–1	Marathón

Tegucigalpa
31 October 1991

Motagua	1–0	Atlético Indio
Castro

Tegucigalpa
9 November 1991

Real España	0–0	Marathón

San Pedro Sula
24 November 1991

Motagua	7–0	Súper Estrella

Tegucigalpa
27 November 1991

Victoria	1–1	Vida
Lanza

La Ceiba
15 December 1991

Vida	1–2	Tela Timsa

La Ceiba

Motagua	4–0	Platense
Avila; Pérez; Obando

Tegucigalpa

Olimpia	2–0	Vida

== Controversies ==
On 14 April 1991, C.D. Victoria lost at home to C.D. Olimpia on week 1 with a 3–5 score. The game was later protested by Victoria due to the inclusion of Antonio Hernández in the Olimpia's lineup. Hernández, who had been sent off in the last game of the previous season, was inactive for one game. After two months of uncertainty, the Discipline Board decided to ignore Victoria's claim after they received a notification from Olimpia stating that Hernández complied with the suspension in an off-season friendly.
