= 1994–95 Honduran Liga Nacional =

Liga Nacional
- Season: 1994–95
- Champions: Victoria (1st)
- Relegated: Deportes Progreseño
- CONCACAF Champions' Cup: Victoria; Olimpia
- Matches: 149
- Goals: 344 (2.31 per match)
- Top goalscorer: Ávila (14)

The 1994–95 Honduran Liga Nacional season was the 29th edition of the Honduran Liga Nacional. The format of the tournament remained the same as the previous season. C.D. Victoria won the title after defeating Club Deportivo Olimpia in the finals. Both teams qualified to the 1996 CONCACAF Champions' Cup.

== 1994-95 teams ==
- Broncos (promoted)
- Deportes Progreseño
- Marathón
- Motagua
- Olimpia
- Platense
- Real España
- Real Maya
- Victoria
- Vida

== Regular season ==
=== Standings ===
Pos	Team	Pld	W	D	L	GF	GA	GD	Pts	Qualification or relegation
1	Olimpia (Note: Olimpia clinched final spot as regular season winner.)	27	19	6	2	48	13	+35	63	Qualification for Final Round (Note: Top 6 qualify for final round.)
2	Motagua	27	15	9	3	42	21	+21	54	Qualification for Final Round
3	Real España	27	10	9	8	27	23	+4	39	Qualification for Final Round
4	Real Maya	27	9	10	8	28	24	+4	37	Qualification for Final Round
5	Victoria	27	9	10	8	29	29	0	37	Qualification for Final Round
6	Marathón	27	9	7	11	34	33	+1	34	Qualification for Final Round
7	Vida	27	8	9	10	38	41	−3	33	
8	Platense	27	5	10	12	18	28	−10	25	
9	Broncos	27	3	12	12	23	41	−18	21	
10	Deportes Progreseño	27	4	6	17	20	54	−34	18	Relegation to Segunda División (Note: Deportes Progreseño relegated to Segunda División.)

== Final round ==
=== Hexagonal ===
27 May 1995 1st leg	Marathón	1–1	Olimpia	San Pedro Sula, Cortés
				Stadium: Estadio Francisco Morazán

1 June 1995 2nd leg	Olimpia	0–0	Marathón	Tegucigalpa, Francisco Morazán
				Stadium: Estadio Tiburcio Carías Andino

- Olimpia 1–1 Marathón on aggregated. Olimpia won on Away goals rule.

28 May 1995 1st leg	Victoria	2–0	Motagua	La Ceiba, Atlántida
	Sambulá; Reyes			Stadium: Estadio Nilmo Edwards

4 June 1995 2nd leg	Motagua	2–4	Victoria	Tegucigalpa, Francisco Morazán
	de Oliveira; Ávila		Izquierdo; Guthrie	Stadium: Estadio Tiburcio Carías Andino

- Victoria won 6–2 on aggregated.

28 May 1995 1st leg	Real Maya	2–1	Real España	Tegucigalpa, Francisco Morazán
	Pérez; Lagos		Vallejo	Stadium: Estadio Tiburcio Carías Andino

3 June 1995 2nd leg	Real España	3–1	Real Maya	San Pedro Sula, Cortés
	Núñez; Vallejo		Lagos	Stadium: Estadio Francisco Morazán

- Real España won 4–3 on aggregated.

=== Triangular standings ===
Pos	Team	Pld	W	D	L	GF	GA	GD	Pts	Qualification or relegation
1	Victoria	4	3	0	1	7	5	+2	9	Qualification for Final (Note: Victoria clinched final spot as triangular winner.)
2	Real España	4	1	1	2	6	6	0	4	
3	Olimpia	4	1	1	2	5	7	−2	4	

=== Final ===
9 July 1995 1st leg	Victoria	0–0	Olimpia	La Ceiba
				Stadium: Estadio Nilmo Edwards; Referee: Amílcar Burgos

16 July 1995 2nd leg	Olimpia	1–1	Victoria	Tegucigalpa
15:30 CST	Cruz 33'		70' Reneau	Stadium: Estadio Tiburcio Carías Andino; Referee: Amílcar Burgos

Olimpia	Victoria

GK	–	(Honduras) Óscar Banegas
DF	–	(Honduras) Rudy Williams
–	–	(Honduras) Norberto Martínez
DF	–	(Uruguay) Fabián Coito
DF	–	(Honduras) Merlyn Membreño
DF	–	(Honduras) Gregorio Serrano
DF	–	(Honduras) Arnold Cruz
MF	–	(Honduras) Christian Santamaría	Substituted off
MF	–	(Honduras) Nahúm Espinoza	Substituted off
FW	–	(Honduras) Marlon Hernández
FW	–	(Honduras) Eugenio Dolmo
Substitutions:
MF	–	(Honduras) Juan Espinoza	Substituted on
MF	–	(Honduras) Mario Peri	Substituted on
Manager:
(Uruguay) Estanislao Malinowski

GK	–	(Honduras) Carlos Padilla
DF	–	(Honduras) Miguel Güity
DF	–	(Honduras) Raúl Martínez
DF	–	(Honduras) José García
DF	–	(Honduras) Javier Martínez
MF	–	(Honduras) Erick Fú
MF	–	(Honduras) Renán Aguilera
MF	–	(Costa Rica) Floyd Guthrie	Substituted off
FW	–	(Honduras) Enrique Reneau
FW	–	(Colombia) Juan Reyes
FW	–	(Uruguay) Álvaro Izquierdo	Substituted off
Substitutions:
–	–	(Honduras) Geovany Alarcón	Substituted on
–	–	(Honduras) Hernán Fúnez	Substituted on
Manager:
(Uruguay) Julio González

- Olimpia 1–1 Victoria on aggregated. Victoria won on Away goals rule.

Liga Nacional
1994–95 Champion
C.D. Victoria
1st title

== Top scorer ==
- (Honduras) Álex Geovanny Ávila (Motagua) with 14 goals

== Squads ==
Broncos
(Honduras) Bayardo Torres
Deportes Progreseño
(Honduras) Jorge Alberto "Bala" Bennett	(Honduras) Oscar Gerardo "Maradona" Cruz	(Honduras) Edith Hernando Contreras
(Honduras) Carlos Aragón	(Honduras) Wilmer Andrés Roque
Marathón
(Honduras) Dangelo Daltino Bautista	(Honduras) Alfonso Sabillón	(Honduras) Walter "Gualala" Trejo
(Honduras) Marco Vinicio "Chacal" Ortega	(Honduras) Luis Alexander Quezada	(Honduras) José Erasmo "Urco" Crisanto Castillo
(Honduras) Ciro Paulino "Palic" Castillo	(Brazil) Octavio Santana	(Honduras) Mario Beata
(Honduras) Troy Anderson	(Honduras) César Adonis Flores	(Honduras) Luis Orlando "Chinito" Reyes Santos
(Honduras) José Ulloa Villatoro	(Honduras) Luis "Gavilán" Cálix	(Honduras) José Luis "Pili" Aguirre
(Honduras) Edwin Alexander Medina	(Honduras) Nicolás Suazo Velásquez	(Honduras) Víctor Coello
(Costa Rica) Pedro Cubillo
Motagua
(Honduras) Marvin Geovany "Mango" Henríquez	(Honduras) Wilmer Enrique "Supermán" Cruz	(Honduras) Alex Geovany Ávila
(Brazil) Paulo Oliveira
Olimpia
(Honduras) Óscar Banegas	(Uruguay) Carlos José Laje Moreno	(Brazil) Denilson Costa de Oliveira
(Honduras) Nahúm Alberto Espinoza Zerón	(Honduras) Christian Santamaría	(Honduras) Marlon Alexander Hernández
(Honduras) Arnold Cruz	(Honduras) Rudy Alberto Williams	(Honduras) Juan Alberto Flores Maradiaga
Platense
(Honduras) Marlon Javier Monge	(Honduras) Rossel Cacho
(Honduras) José Luis "Runga" Piota	(Honduras) Mauricio Edgardo Figueroa	(Honduras) Jorge Arita Neals
Real España
(Honduras) Milton "Chocolate" Flores	(Honduras) José Mauricio "Guicho" Fúnez Barrientos	(Honduras) Gustavo Adolfo Gallegos
(Honduras) Luis Orlando "Caralampio" Vallejo Arguijo	(Honduras) Marco Antonio Anariba Zelaya	(Honduras) Miguel Angel "Gallo" Mariano
(Honduras) Camilo Bonilla Paz	(Honduras) Norman "Tedy" Martínez	(Honduras) Milton “Tyson” Núñez
(Uruguay) Enrique Daniel Uberti García	(Uruguay) Washington Leonardo "Piojo" Hernández	(Honduras) Víctor Martín Castro
(Honduras) Erick Gerardo Gallegos
Real Maya
(Honduras) Edgar Antonio Figueroa	(Honduras) Víctor Sebastián Zúniga	(Honduras) Nelson Rolando Rosales
(Honduras) Edgardo Geovany "Yura" Róchez
Victoria
(Honduras) Roberto Carlos "Chato" Padilla Ramírez	(Honduras) Gustavo Moncada	(Honduras) Mario Guerrero	(Honduras) Javier Martínez
(Honduras) Geovany Gayle Alarcón	(Honduras) Raúl Martínez Sambulá	(Costa Rica) Floyd Guthrie
(Colombia) Juan Reyes Gruesso	(Uruguay) Alvaro Roberto Izquierdo	(Honduras) Rossel Hugo Vilorio
(Honduras) Mario Lanza	(Honduras) Eduardo Arriola	(Honduras) Hernán Fúnez
(Honduras) Miguel Arcángel Güity	(Honduras) Víctor Garay	(Honduras) Erick Darío Fú Lanza
(Honduras) Renán "Chimbo" Aguilera Contreras	(Honduras) Enrique Reneau	(Honduras) José Antonio García Bernárdez
Vida
(Honduras) René Arturo David "Pupa" Martínez	(Honduras) Jorge Ernesto Pineda	(Honduras) Dennis Antonio Pieddy
(Honduras) Clayd Lester Marson

== Known results ==
=== Round 1 ===
Real Maya	0–1	Olimpia
		Santamaría

=== Round 2 ===
1994-10-30

Real España	0 - 2	Real Maya

San Pedro Sula
1994-10-30

Olimpia	5 - 0	Deportes Progreseño

Tegucigalpa

=== Round 3 ===
1994-11-06

Broncos	3 - 1	Platense

Monjarás

=== Triangular ===
11 June 1995

Olimpia	3–1	Victoria

Tegucigalpa
21 June 1995

Real España	3–1	Olimpia
Núñez; Bonilla; Pavón		Flores

San Pedro Sula
2 July 1995

Olimpia	1–1	Real España
Costa		Castro

Tegucigalpa

=== Unknown rounds ===
20 November 1994	Olimpia	1–0	Motagua	Tegucigalpa, Francisco Morazán
16:00 CST	Espinoza			Stadium: Estadio Tiburcio Carías Andino

27 November 1994	Vida	0–4	Olimpia	La Ceiba, Atlántida
CST				Stadium: Estadio Nilmo Edwards

4 January 1995	Marathón	5–1	Vida	San Pedro Sula, Cortés
CST				Stadium: Estadio General Francisco Morazán

5 February 1995	Motagua	1–1	Olimpia	Tegucigalpa, Francisco Morazán
16:00 CST	Oliveira		Dolmo	Stadium: Estadio Tiburcio Carías Andino; Referee: Argelio Sabillón

17 February 1995	Real España	2–1	Marathón	San Pedro Sula, Cortés
18:30 CST	Martínez		Santana	Stadium: Estadio General Francisco Morazán

22 February 1995	Deportes Progreseño	0–5	Victoria	San Pedro Sula, Cortés
CST				Stadium: Estadio General Francisco Morazán

4 March 1995	Deportes Progreseño	1–3	Real Maya	San Pedro Sula, Cortés
CST				Stadium: Estadio General Francisco Morazán

23 April 1995	Deportes Progreseño	1–2	Motagua	El Progreso, Yoro
CST				Stadium: Estadio Humberto Micheletti

7 May 1995	Motagua	2–0	Real Maya	Tegucigalpa, Francisco Morazán
CST	Guevara			Stadium: Estadio Tiburcio Carías Andino

13 May 1995	Real España	2–1	Motagua
CST

14 May 1995	Vida	7–1	Broncos	La Ceiba, Atlántida
CST	Pineda; Castro; Pieddy; Dolmo		Ochoa	Stadium: Estadio Nilmo Edwards

18 May 1995	Platense	0–2	Motagua	Puerto Cortés, Cortés
CST			Carson; Romero	Stadium: Estadio Excélsior

	Marathón	0–1	Motagua	San Pedro Sula, Cortés
CST				Stadium: Estadio General Francisco Morazán

	Motagua	1–1	Marathón	Tegucigalpa, Francisco Morazán
CST				Stadium: Estadio Tiburcio Carías Andino
