= 1990–91 Honduran Liga Nacional =

Honduran Football League First Division Season

Liga Nacional
- Season: 1990–91
- Champions: Real España (6th)
- Relegated: Súper Estrella
- CONCACAF Champions' Cup: Real España; Motagua
- Matches: 158
- Goals: 312 (1.97 per match)
- Top goalscorer: Vallejo (12)
- All statistics correct as of 16 February 1991.

The 1990–91 Honduran Liga Nacional season was the 25th edition of the Honduran Liga Nacional. The format of the tournament consisted of a three round-robins followed by a 5-team playoff round.

Club Deportivo Olimpia unsuccessfully defended its 1989 title losing in a replay match to Motagua.

Real C.D. España won the title defeating in the final C.D. Motagua. Both title holder and runner-up qualified for berths to the 1991 CONCACAF Champions' Cup.

== 1990–91 teams ==
- Curacao (Tegucigalpa)
- Marathón (San Pedro Sula)
- Motagua (Tegucigalpa)
- Olimpia (Tegucigalpa)
- Real España (San Pedro Sula)
- Sula (La Lima)
- Súper Estrella (Danlí)
- Tela Timsa (Tela, promoted)
- Victoria (La Ceiba)
- Vida (La Ceiba)
- Platense played their home games at Estadio Francisco Morazán due to renovations at Estadio Excélsior.

== Regular season ==
=== Standings ===
Pos	Team	Pld	W	D	L	GF	GA	GD	Pts	Qualification or relegation
1	Real España (Note: Real España clinched final spot as regular season winner.)	27	15	9	3	44	20	+24	39	Qualified to the Final round (Note: Top 5 qualify for final round.)
2	Marathón	27	15	8	4	46	21	+25	38	Qualified to the Final round
3	Olimpia	27	12	13	2	36	18	+18	37	Qualified to the Final round
4	Platense	27	8	11	8	20	24	−4	27	Qualified to the Final round
5	Motagua	27	6	14	7	26	23	+3	26	Qualified to the Final round
6	Victoria	27	6	10	11	18	25	−7	22	
7	Vida	27	4	13	10	20	30	−10	21	
8	Tela Timsa	27	7	7	13	19	34	−15	21	
9	Súper Estrella	27	5	11	11	22	41	−19	21	
10	Sula	27	5	8	14	18	33	−15	18	Relegated to Segunda División (Note: Sula relegated to Segunda División.)

== Final round ==
=== Pentagonal standings ===
Pos	Team	Pld	W	D	L	GF	GA	GD	Pts	Qualification or relegation
1	Olimpia	8	3	5	0	10	5	+5	11	Forced to a Replay (Note: Olimpia and Motagua to play an extra match to break the tie.)
2	Motagua	8	4	3	1	6	3	+3	11	Forced to a Replay
3	Real España	8	4	2	2	14	11	+3	10	
4	Platense	8	1	3	4	4	8	−4	5	
5	Marathón	8	0	3	5	5	12	−7	3	

=== Replay ===
6 February 1991 Replay	Motagua	1–0 (a.e.t.)	Olimpia	Tegucigalpa, Francisco Morazán
20:00 CST	Sierra 115'			Stadium: Estadio Tiburcio Carías Andino; Attendance: 23,252

- Motagua qualified to the Final.

=== Final ===
10 February 1991 1st leg	Motagua	0–0	Real España	Tegucigalpa, Francisco Morazán
16:00				Stadium: Estadio Tiburcio Carías Andino

16 February 1991 2nd leg	Real España	2–1	Motagua	San Pedro Sula, Cortés
	Smith		Murillo	Stadium: Estadio Francisco Morazán

== Top scorer ==
- (Honduras) Luis Orlando Vallejo (Real España) with 12 goals

== Squads ==
Marathón
(Honduras) Francisco Adelmo Herrera	(Honduras) José Luis "Joche" Alvarado	(Honduras) Roy Arturo Padilla Bardales
(Honduras) José Ulloa Villatoro	(Honduras) Neptaly Turcios	(Honduras) Marco "Tono" García
(Honduras) José Manuel Enamorado Díaz	(Honduras) Pedro Geovany Midence	(Honduras) Nicolás Suazo Velásquez
(Honduras) Francisco Adelmo Herrera	(Honduras) Leonel Machado	(Honduras) Pastor Martínez
(Honduras) Jorge Alberto "Bala" Bennett	(Honduras) Juan Gómez Ortiz	(Honduras) Oscar Gerardo "Maradona" Cruz
(Honduras) Mauro Pacheco	(Honduras) Ciro Paulino "Palic" Castillo
Motagua
(Honduras) Marvin Geovany "Mango" Henríquez	(Honduras) Oscar Murillo	(Honduras) Patrocinio Sierra Doblado
(Honduras) Fabricio Pérez	(Honduras) Hernaín Arzú	(Honduras) Giovanni "Venado" Castro
(Uruguay) Fernando Rinaldi	(Honduras) César Augusto "Nene" Obando	(Honduras) Miguel Antonio Mathews Sargent
Olimpia
(Honduras) Belarmino Rivera	(Honduras) Óscar Banegas	(Honduras) Eduardo "Balín" Bennett
(Uruguay) Carlos José Laje Moreno	(Honduras) Alejandro Ruíz	(Honduras) Suamy Martínez
(Honduras) Eduardo Arriola	(Honduras) Wilmer Neal "Matador" Velásquez	(Honduras) Rolando Reyes Vásquez
(Honduras) Daniel Zapata	(Honduras) Nahúm Alberto Espinoza Zerón	(Honduras) Erick Darío Fú Lanza
(Honduras) Arnold Cruz	(Honduras) Néstor Peralta	(Honduras) Danilo "Pollo" Galindo
(Honduras) Juan Carlos Espinoza	(Honduras) Santos Alejandro "El Indio" Ruíz	(Honduras) Martín Stuart
(Honduras) Armando Aguilar	(Honduras) Eduardo Sosa	(Honduras) Dennis Antonio Piedy
(Uruguay) Vicente Daniel Viera	(Honduras) Fernando Tovar Durón	(Honduras) Alex Pineda Chacón
Platense
(Honduras) Julio César "El Tile" Arzú	(Honduras) Wilmer Enrique "Supermán" Cruz	(Honduras) Miguel "Payasito" Gómez
(Honduras) German "Niño" Bernárdez	(Honduras) Jorge Arita Neals	(Honduras) Rossel Antonio Cacho
(Honduras) Wilson Omar Reyes Martínez	(Honduras) Dennis Caballero	(Honduras) Selvin Sánchez Reyes
(Honduras) Raúl Centeno Gamboa
Real España
(Honduras) Julio César "El Tile" Arzú	(Honduras) José Mauricio "Guicho" Fúnez Barrientos	(Honduras) Rodolfo Richardson Smith
(Honduras) Juan Ramón "Montuca" Castro	(Honduras) Juan Manuel "Nito" Anariba	(Uruguay) Jorge López Silva
(Honduras) Rafael González	(Honduras) Alex Geovany Ávila	(Honduras) Geovany Gayle Alarcón
(Honduras) Luis "Gavilán" Cálix	(Honduras) Nahamán Humberto González	(Honduras) Erick Gerardo Gallegos
(Honduras) Rigoberto González	(Honduras) Ramón "Primitivo" Maradiaga	(Honduras) Luis Orlando "Caralampio" Vallejo Arguijo
(Honduras) Karl Antonio Roland	(Honduras) Edgardo Emilson Soto Fajardo	(Honduras) José Luis "Pili" Aguirre
(Honduras) Marco Antonio Anariba Zepeda	(Honduras) Carlos Fernando Landa	(Honduras) Allan Anthony Costly
(Honduras) Camilo Bonilla Paz	(Honduras) Carlos Orlando Caballero	(Honduras) Edy "Tibombo" Contreras
Sula
(Honduras) Marco Antonio "Toñito" Gómez	(Honduras) Noel Omar Renderos	(Honduras) Óscar "Pito Loco" López
(Honduras) Luis Alonso Zúniga	(Honduras) Jorge Alberto "Cuca" Bueso Iglesias	(Honduras) Fernando Nuila
(Honduras) Edgardo Geovany "Yura" Róchez	(Honduras) Carlos Aguilar Bonilla
Súper Estrella
(Honduras) Víctor Hernán Duarte	(Costa Rica) Eduardo "Tanque" Ramírez	(Honduras) Darío Mejía
(Honduras) Ramon Zavala	(Honduras) German Pérez	(Uruguay) Misael Pinto
(Honduras) Edgardo "Chacho" Zamora	(Honduras) Jorge "Pando" Arriola	(Honduras) Prudencio "Tecate" Norales
(Honduras) Suammy Álvarez	(Honduras) Carlos Cruz Padilla
Tela Timsa
(Honduras) Golbin Bonilla	(Honduras) Carlos Flores	(Honduras) Samuel "Samy" Rivera
(Honduras) Renan "Chimbo" Aguilera	(Honduras) Ernesto "Neto" Isaula	(Honduras) Mateo Ávila
(Honduras) Ibrahím Maldonado	(Honduras) Víctor Garay
Victoria
(Honduras) Carlos Roberto "Condorito" Mejía	(Honduras) Enrique Reneau	(Honduras) Renán "Chimbo" Aguilera Contreras
Vida
(Honduras) Carlos Ramírez	(Honduras) Rudy Pine Pack	(Honduras) José Danilo Carías Figueroa
(Honduras) René Arturo David "Pupa" Martínez	(Honduras) Jorge Ernesto Pineda

== Known results ==
=== Round 1 ===
11 March 1990

Súper Estrella	0–4	Real España
		Soto; Vallejo

Danlí
11 March 1990

Sula	2–0	Platense
Renderos 46'

San Pedro Sula

=== Pentagonal ===
21 November 1990

Marathón	0–1	Motagua
		Pérez

San Pedro Sula
22 November 1990

Olimpia	4–1	Real España
Bennett; Laje; Espinoza		Vallejo

Tegucigalpa
Referee: Rodolfo Martínez
2 December 1990

Motagua	0–1	Platense
		Caballero

Tegucigalpa
6 December 1990

Motagua	0–0	Olimpia

Tegucigalpa
12 December 1990

Real España	4–1	Marathón
Smith; Anariba; Contreras		García

San Pedro Sula
6 January 1991

Real España	1–0	Motagua

San Pedro Sula
6 January 1991

Olimpia	2–1	Marathón
Zapata; Bennett		Machado

Tegucigalpa
13 January 1991

Motagua	1–0	Marathón
Obando 41'

Tegucigalpa
16 January 1991

Real España	1–1	Olimpia
Contreras		Bennett

San Pedro Sula
20 January 1991

Motagua	2–1	Real España

Tegucigalpa
26 January 1991

Marathón	1–1	Olimpia
Machado		Laje

San Pedro Sula
2 February 1991

Marathón	1–2	Real España
Pacheco		Smith; Aguirre

San Pedro Sula
3 February 1991

Olimpia	0–0	Motagua

Tegucigalpa

=== Unknown rounds ===
4 April 1990

Marathón	3–0	Súper Estrella
Turcios

San Pedro Sula
25 April 1990

Sula	2–2	Vida

San Pedro Sula
26 April 1990

Olimpia	2–2	Real España

Tegucigalpa
28 April 1990

Curacao	1–1	Súper Estrella

Tegucigalpa
2 May 1990

Sula	2–1	Marathón

San Pedro Sula
6 May 1990

Victoria	v	Tela Timsa

La Ceiba
17 May 1990

Olimpia	1–1	Sula
		Renderos

Tegucigalpa
27 May 1990

Motagua	5–0	Vida

Tegucigalpa
3 June 1990

Tela Timsa	1–5	Real España

Tela
10 June 1990

Motagua	2–1	Victoria

Tegucigalpa
15 July 1990

Motagua	1–1	Olimpia
Obando		Cornet

Tegucigalpa
28 July 1990

Real España	1–1	Olimpia

San Pedro Sula
30 September 1990

Victoria	1–0	Marathón
Martínez

La Ceiba
13 October 1990

Sula	1–3	Victoria
Urbina		Meléndez; D. Flores; J. Flores

San Pedro Sula
21 October 1990

Vida	3–2	Olimpia
Carías; Dueñas; Pineda		Cornet; Espinoza

La Ceiba
28 October 1990

Vida	0–1	Real España

La Ceiba
28 October 1990

Olimpia	5–1	Sula

Tegucigalpa
1 November 1990

Olimpia	1–0	Curacao
Ruíz

Tegucigalpa

Marathón	5–2	Súper Estrella

Marathón	1–1	Real España

San Pedro Sula

Real España	2–1	Marathón

San Pedro Sula
