= 1991 CONCACAF Champions' Cup =

27th edition of premier club football tournament organized by CONCACAF

Tournament details
- Dates: 8 September – 24 September
- Teams: 3 (from 3 associations)

Final positions
- Champions: (Mexico) Puebla (1st title)
- Runners-up: (Trinidad and Tobago) Police

Tournament statistics
- Matches played: 4
- Goals scored: 7 (1.75 per match)

The 1991 CONCACAF Champions' Cup was the 27th edition of the annual international club football competition held in the CONCACAF region (North America, Central America and the Caribbean), the CONCACAF Champions' Cup. It determined that year's club champion of association football in the CONCACAF region and was played from 7 April till 24 September 1991.

The teams were split in three zones (North, Central and Caribbean), each one qualifying the winner to the final tournament, where the winners of the Caribbean and Central zones played a semi-final to decide who was going to play against the Northern champion in the final. All the matches in the tournament were played under the home/away match system.

Mexican club Puebla beat Trinidarian Police 4–2 on aggregate. Therefore, Puebla won their first CONCACAF championship, which was also their first international title. This is the last time a Caribbean team appeared in the final.

== North American Zone ==
=== First round ===
13 April 1991	Dandy Town Hornets (Bermuda)	3–1	(United States) Brooklyn Italians

27 April 1991	Brooklyn Italians (United States)	3–0 (4–3 agg.)	(Bermuda) Dandy Town Hornets

27 April 1991	Pembroke Hamilton Zebras (Bermuda)	2–0	(United States) Eagles
	Dill

5 May 1991	Eagles (United States)	1–2 (1–4 agg.)	(Bermuda) Pembroke Hamilton Zebras
	Krzyskow		1' Ming; Swan

=== Second round ===
Puebla (Mexico)	v	(United States) Brooklyn Italians

Universidad de Guadalajara (Mexico)	v	(Bermuda) Pembroke Hamilton Zebras

Brooklyn Italians and Pembroke Hamilton Zebras withdrew. Puebla and Universidad de Guadalajara automatically advanced to third round.

=== Third round ===
8 September 1991	Puebla (Mexico)	2–0	(Mexico) Universidad de Guadalajara	Puebla, Mexico
	Chávez 30'; Poblete 69'			Stadium: Estadio Cuauhtémoc
Note: Played over one leg

Puebla advances to the CONCACAF Final Series.

== Central American Zone ==
=== First round ===
Torneo Centroamericano de Concacaf 1991

7 April 1991	Tauro (Panama)	5–0	(Nicaragua) América Managua	Panama City, Panama
	Edgar Samaniego; Maldonado			Stadium: Estadio Rommel Fernández; Referee: José Vargas (CRC)

21 April 1991	América Managua (Nicaragua)	0–0 (0–5 agg.)	(Panama) Tauro	Managua, Nicaragua
				Stadium: Estadio Stanley Cayasso

10 April 1991	Saprissa (Costa Rica)	4–1	(Nicaragua) Real Estelí	San Juan de Tibás, Costa Rica
	Victor Badilla; Herra; Picado		Vendana	Stadium: Estadio Ricardo Saprissa Aymá; Referee: Francisco Amaya

28 April 1991	Real Estelí (Nicaragua)	1–4 (2–8 agg.)	(Costa Rica) Saprissa	Estelí, Nicaragua
	Arriola 15'		Orta; Carabanca	Stadium: Estadio Independencia; Referee: Armando Barrios (PAN)

16 April 1991	Alajuelense (Costa Rica)	4–1	(Panama) Plaza Amador	Alajuela, Costa Rica
	Karoch; Solano; Brenes		Botello	Stadium: Estadio Alejandro Morera Soto; Referee: Gonzalo Tejada (HON)

18 April 1991	Plaza Amador (Panama)	0–7 (1–11 agg.)	(Costa Rica) Alajuelense	Alajuela, Costa Rica
	TBD		Jakubec; Fernández; Guillén (pen.); Arguedas	Stadium: Estadio Alejandro Morera Soto; Referee: Víctor Chinchilla (GUA)
Note: Both legs in Alajuela

21 April 1991	Acros Duurly's (Belize)	0–4	(El Salvador) Luis Ángel Firpo	Belize City, Belize
			Fernando De Moura	Stadium: MCC Grounds

5 May 1991	Luis Ángel Firpo (El Salvador)	4–0 (8–0 agg.)	(Belize) Acros Duurly's	San Salvador, El Salvador
	Osmel Zapata			Stadium: Estadio Cuscatlán

27 April 1991	Real España (Honduras)	5–0	(Belize) Acros Verdes	San Pedro Sula, Honduras
	Anariba; Aguirre; González; Castillo			Stadium: Estadio Francisco Morazán

5 May 1991	Acros Verdes (Belize)	0–1 (0–6 agg.)	(Honduras) Real España	Belize City, Belize
			González 74'	Stadium: MCC Grounds

1 May 1991	Motagua (Honduras)	1–1	(Guatemala) Comunicaciones	Tegucigalpa, Honduras
	Ávila		Bordon 71'	Stadium: Estadio Tiburcio Carías Andino; Attendance: 24,250; Referee: Ronald Gutiérrez (CRC)

5 May 1991	Comunicaciones (Guatemala)	1–0 (2–1 agg.)	(Honduras) Motagua	Guatemala City, Guatemala
	Di Luca			Stadium: Estadio Mateo Flores

3 May 1991	Municipal (Guatemala)	2–5	(El Salvador) Alianza	Guatemala City, Guatemala
	Donis; Ochoa		Eduardo Ramírez; Raul Toro; Hector López	Stadium: Estadio El Trébol; Attendance: 7,000; Referee: Rodrigo Badilla (CRC)

8 May 1991	Alianza (El Salvador)	1–1 (6–3 agg.)	(Guatemala) Municipal	San Salvador, El Salvador
	Raul Toro		TBD	Stadium: Estadio Cuscatlán

=== Second round ===
22 May 1991	Saprissa (Costa Rica)	3–1	(Panama) Tauro	[[San Juan District, Tibás| San Juan de Tibás]], Costa Rica
	Vladimir Quesada; Evaristo Coronado; Alexandre Guimarães (pen.)		Edgar Samaniego	Stadium: Estadio Ricardo Saprissa Aymá

9 June 1991	Tauro (Panama)	0–2 (1–5 agg.)	(Costa Rica) Saprissa	Panama City, Panama
			Adonis Vieira; Evaristo Coronado	Stadium: Estadio Rommel Fernández; Referee: Rafael Martínez (SLV)

22 May 1991	Luis Ángel Firpo (El Salvador)	2–0	(Guatemala) Comunicaciones	San Salvador, El Salvador
	Fernando de Moura; Luis Guelmo			Stadium: Estadio Cuscatlán; Attendance: 6,000; Referee: Jorge Urías (HON)

15 June 1991	Comunicaciones (Guatemala)	4–3 (4–5 agg.)	(El Salvador) Luis Ángel Firpo	Guatemala City, Guatemala
	Pereira; Chacón; Pérez; Bauza		Fernando de Moura; Marlon Menjívar; Zapata	Stadium: Estadio Mateo Flores; Referee: Rodolfo Martínez

5 June 1991	Alianza (El Salvador)	0–1	(Honduras) Real España	San Salvador, El Salvador
			Luis Vallejo 45'	Stadium: Estadio Cuscatlán; Attendance: 4,200; Referee: José Burgos (CRC)

12 June 1991	Real España (Honduras)	1–1 (2–1 agg.)	(El Salvador) Alianza	San Pedro Sula, Honduras
	Washington Hernández		William Chachagua	Stadium: Estadio Francisco Morazán; Referee: Mario Escobar (GUA)

Alajuelense bye.

=== Third round ===
Team 1	Agg.	Team 2	1st leg	2nd leg
Real España (Honduras)	3–0	(Costa Rica) Alajuelense	2–0	1–0
Firpo (El Salvador)	1–4	(Costa Rica) Saprissa	1–1	0–3

- Real C.D. España and Deportivo Saprissa advance to the fourth round.

Real España (Honduras)	2–0	(Costa Rica) Alajuelense	San Pedro Sula, Honduras
Ciro Castillo; José Luis Aguirre			Stadium: Estadio Francisco Morazán; Attendance: 5,500

Alajuelense (Costa Rica)	0-1 (0-3 agg.)	(Honduras) Real España	Alajuela, Costa Rica
		Camilo Bonilla 70	Stadium: Estadio Alejandro Morera Soto

Firpo	1–1	(Costa Rica) Saprissa	San Salvador, El Salvador
Raul Diaz Arce		Adonis Hilario Vieira	Stadium: Estadio Cuscatlán

Saprissa (Costa Rica)	3-0 (4-1 agg.)	(El Salvador) Firpo	San Juan de Tibás, Costa Rica
Adonis Hilario Vieira; Roland González Brenes; Rolando Fonseca Jiménez			Stadium: Estadio Ricardo Saprissa Aymá

=== Final ===
Team 1	Agg.	Team 2	1st leg	2nd leg
Saprissa (Costa Rica)	1–4	(Honduras) Real España	1–2	0–2

- Real C.D. España advances to the CONCACAF Final Series.

Saprissa (Costa Rica)	1–2	(Honduras) Real España	San Juan de Tibás, Costa Rica
Adonis Hilario Vieira 15		Washington Hernández 71; Marco Antonio Anariba 76	Stadium: Estadio Ricardo Saprissa Aymá

Real España (Honduras)	2–0 (4-1 agg.)	(Costa Rica) Saprissa	San Pedro Sula
Marco Vinicio Ortega 32; José Luis Aguirre 90			Stadium: Estadio Francisco Morazán

== Caribbean Zone ==
=== First round ===
Team 1	Agg.	Team 2	1st leg	2nd leg
Solidarité Scolaire (Guadeloupe)	1–3	(Martinique) Marinoise	0–2	1–1
Strikers (Cayman Islands)	1–2	(Haiti) Racing Gonaïves	0–0	1–2
Capoise (Haiti)	4–3	(Netherlands Antilles) Sithoc	3–0	1–3
Black Lions (Jamaica)	1–2	(Cayman Islands) Scholars International	1–1	0–1
SUBT (Netherlands Antilles)	0–6	(Suriname) Transvaal	0–3	0–3
Olympique du Marin (Martinique)	3–2	(French Guiana) Kouroucien	0–0	3–2
Police (Trinidad and Tobago)	4–4	(Jamaica) Reno	2–1	2–3
Robinhood (Suriname)	2–3	(Trinidad and Tobago) Defence Force	1–0	1–3
L'Etoile (Guadeloupe)	bye			

Solidarité Scolaire (Guadeloupe)	0-2	(Martinique) Marinoise
Nil

Marinoise (Martinique)	1-1 (3-1 agg.)	(Guadeloupe) Solidarité Scolaire

Strikers (Cayman Islands)	0–0	(Haiti) Racing Gonaïves
Nil		Nil

Racing Gonaïves (Haiti)	2–1 (2-1 agg.)	(Cayman Islands) Strikers

Capoise (Haiti)	3–0	(Netherlands Antilles) Sithoc
		Nil

Sithoc (Netherlands Antilles)	3-1 (3-4 agg.)	(Haiti) Capoise

Black Lions (Jamaica)	1–1	(Cayman Islands) Scholars International

Scholars International (Cayman Islands)	1-0 (2-1 agg.)	(Jamaica) Black Lions
		Nil

SUBT (Netherlands Antilles)	0-3	(Suriname) Transvaal
Nil

Transvaal (Suriname)	3-0 (6-0 agg.)	(Netherlands Antilles) SUBT
		Nil

Olympique du Marin (Martinique)	0–0	(French Guiana) Kouroucien
Nil		Nil

Kouroucien (French Guiana)	2-3 (2-3 agg.)	(Martinique) Olympique du Marin

Police (Trinidad and Tobago)	2-1	(Jamaica) Reno

Reno (Jamaica)	3–2 (4-4 agg.)	(Trinidad and Tobago) Police

Robinhood (Suriname)	1–0	(Trinidad and Tobago) Defence Force
		Nil

Defence Force (Trinidad and Tobago)	3-1 (3-2 agg.)	(Suriname) Robinhood

=== Second round ===
Team 1	Agg.	Team 2	1st leg	2nd leg
Racing Gonaïves (Haiti)	3–4	(Martinique) Marinoise	1–1	2–3
Capoise (Haiti)	1–4	(Guadeloupe) L'Etoile	1–1	0–3
Police (Trinidad and Tobago)	4–0	(Suriname) Transvaal	2–0	2–0
Scholars International (Cayman Islands)	0–7	(Trinidad and Tobago) Defence Force	0–6	0–1
Olympique du Marin (Martinique)	bye			

Racing Gonaïves (Haiti)	1–1	(Martinique) Marinoise

Marinoise (Martinique)	3–2 (4-3 agg.)	(Haiti) Racing Gonaïves

Capoise (Haiti)	1–1	(Guadeloupe) L'Etoile

L'Etoile (Guadeloupe)	3-0 (4-1 agg.)	(Haiti) Capoise
		Nil

Police (Trinidad and Tobago)	2–0	(Suriname) Transvaal
		Nil

Transvaal (Suriname)	0–2 (0-4 agg.)	(Trinidad and Tobago) Police
Nil

Scholars International (Cayman Islands)	0-6	(Trinidad and Tobago) Defence Force
Nil

Defence Force (Trinidad and Tobago)	1-0 (7-0 agg.)	(Cayman Islands) Scholars International
		Nil

=== Third round ===
Team 1	Agg.	Team 2	1st leg	2nd leg
Olympique du Marin (Martinique)	8–0	(Guadeloupe) L'Etoile	5–0	3–0
Defence Force (Trinidad and Tobago)	2–3	(Trinidad and Tobago) Police	1–0	1–3
Marinoise (Martinique)	Bye			

Olympique du Marin (Martinique)	5–0	(Guadeloupe) L'Etoile
		Nil

L'Etoile (Guadeloupe)	0-3 (0-8 agg.)	(Martinique) Olympique du Marin
Nil

Defence Force (Trinidad and Tobago)	1–0	(Trinidad and Tobago) Police
		Nil

Police (Trinidad and Tobago)	3–1 (3-2 agg.)	(Trinidad and Tobago) Defence Force

=== Fourth round ===
Team 1	Agg.	Team 2	1st leg	2nd leg
Marinoise (Martinique)	4–5	(Trinidad and Tobago) Police	3–2	1–3
Olympique du Marin (Martinique)	bye			

Marinoise (Martinique)	3-2	(Trinidad and Tobago) Police

Police (Trinidad and Tobago)	3-1 (5-4 agg.)	(Martinique) Marinoise

=== Final ===
Team 1	Agg.	Team 2	1st leg	2nd leg
Olympique du Marin (Martinique)	3–4	(Trinidad and Tobago) Police	2–1	1–3

Olympique du Marin (Martinique)	2-1	(Trinidad and Tobago) Police

Police (Trinidad and Tobago)	3-1 (4-3 agg.)	(Martinique) Olympique du Marin

== Semifinal ==
Team 1	Agg.	Team 2	1st leg	2nd leg
Real España (Honduras)	0–1	(Trinidad and Tobago) Police	0–0	0–1

September 8, 1991	Real España (Honduras)	0–0	(Trinidad and Tobago) Police	San Pedro Sula, Honduras
				Stadium: Estadio Francisco Morazán

September 15, 1991	Police (Trinidad and Tobago)	1–0 (1–0 agg.)	(Honduras) Real España	Port of Spain, Trinidad and Tobago
	Boisson			Stadium: Hasely Crawford Stadium

- (Trinidad and Tobago) Police advance to final

- (Mexico) Puebla advance to final (bye)

== Final ==
=== First leg ===
1991 CONCACAF Champions' Cup Final
18 September 1991
First leg

Puebla (Mexico)	3–1	(Trinidad and Tobago) Police
Ruiz 5'; Gelinski 34'; Paulo César 74'	Report	59' Alfred

Estadio Cuauhtémoc, Puebla

=== Second leg ===
24 September 1991
Second leg

Police (Trinidad and Tobago)	1–1	(Mexico) Puebla
Boissoen 70'	Report	56' Porto

Hasely Crawford Stadium, Port of Spain

Team details

Police
Puebla

GK	(Trinidad and Tobago) Maurice
DF	(Trinidad and Tobago) Jones
DF	(Trinidad and Tobago) Denoon
DF	(Suriname) Olivierre
DF	(Trinidad and Tobago) John
MF	(Trinidad and Tobago) Wadne Alfred	(substituted off) a'
MF	(Trinidad and Tobago) Dennis
MF	(Trinidad and Tobago) Canadian Boisson
MF	(Trinidad and Tobago) Nelson
FW	(Trinidad and Tobago) Baptiste	(substituted off) b'
FW	(Trinidad and Tobago) Benjamin
Substitutions:
GK	(Guyana) Thomas	(substituted on) a'
DF	(Trinidad and Tobago) Jeffrey	(substituted on) b'
Manager:
?

GK	(Mexico) Pablo Larios
DF	(Mexico) Jorge Patiño	(substituted off) a'
DF	(Mexico) Aurelio Rivera
DF	(Mexico) Roberto Ruiz
DF	(Mexico) Julio C. Algarín
MF	(Mexico) Renato Porto
MF	(Brazil) Paulo César
MF	(Mexico) Paco Ramírez
MF	(Chile) Carlos Poblete
FW	(Mexico) Juan Carlos Chávez	(substituted off) b'
FW	(Brazil) Salvador Reyes
Substitutions:
GK	(Mexico) Gutiérrez	(substituted on) a'
DF	(Mexico) Gerardo González	(substituted on) b'
Manager:
(Mexico) Manuel Lapuente

Puebla won 3–1 on points (4–2 on aggregate)

== Champion ==
CONCACAF Champions' Cup
1991 Winners
(Mexico)
Puebla
First title
