= 1988–89 Honduran Liga Nacional =

Liga Nacional
- Season: 1988–89
- Champions: Real España (5th)
- Relegated: Universidad
- CONCACAF Champions' Cup: Real España; Olimpia
- Matches: 158
- Goals: 268 (1.7 per match)
- Top goalscorer: Mathews (8); Alonso (8); Lobo (8); Centeno (8)
- All statistics correct as of 24 December 1988.

The 1988–89 Honduran Liga Nacional season was the 23rd edition of the Honduran Liga Nacional. The format of the tournament was the same as the 1987-88 season. This edition was a rematch of the 22st edition final. Real C.D. España defeated Club Deportivo Olimpia in the final. Title holder and runner-up qualified for berths to the 1989 CONCACAF Champions' Cup.

== 1988–89 teams ==
- Curacao (Tegucigalpa, promoted)
- Marathón (San Pedro Sula)
- Motagua (Tegucigalpa)
- Olimpia (Tegucigalpa)
- Platense (Puerto Cortés)
- Real España (San Pedro Sula)
- Sula (La Lima)
- Universidad (Tegucigalpa)
- Victoria (La Ceiba)
- Vida (La Ceiba)
- Platense played their home games at Estadio Francisco Morazán due to renovations at Estadio Excélsior.

== Regular season ==
=== Standings Group A ===
Pos	Team	Pld	W	D	L	GF	GA	GD	Pts	Qualification or relegation
1	Olimpia	27	10	12	5	25	17	+8	32	Qualified to the Final round (Note: Olimpia and Marathón qualified to the Final round.)
2	Marathón	27	7	14	6	21	17	+4	28	Qualified to the Final round
3	Victoria	27	7	12	8	21	21	0	26	
4	Curacao	27	5	13	9	21	31	−10	23	
5	Platense	27	5	12	10	21	28	−7	22	

=== Standings Group B ===
Pos	Team	Pld	W	D	L	GF	GA	GD	Pts	Qualification or relegation
1	Real España (Note: Real España clinched final spot as Regular season winner.)	27	13	10	4	32	19	+13	36	Qualified to the Final round (Note: Real España, Motagua and Vida qualified to Final round.)
2	Motagua	27	10	12	5	26	18	+8	32	Qualified to the Final round
3	Vida	27	9	9	9	19	18	+1	27	Qualified to the Final round
4	Sula	27	7	9	11	28	34	−6	23	
5	Universidad	27	7	7	13	15	26	−11	21	Relegated to Segunda División (Note: Universidad relegated to Segunda División.)

=== Reply for 2nd place ===
19 October 1988 Replay	Olimpia	2–0	Motagua	Tegucigalpa, Francisco Morazán
	Norales; Flores			Stadium: Estadio Tiburcio Carías Andino

== Final round ==
=== Pentagonal standings ===
Pos	Team	Pld	W	D	L	GF	GA	GD	Pts	Qualification or relegation
1	Olimpia	8	4	4	0	8	3	+5	12	Qualified to the Final round (Note: Olimpia qualified to Final as Pentagonal winner.)
2	Real España	8	3	4	1	7	3	+4	10	
3	Motagua	8	2	4	2	4	6	−2	8	
4	Vida	8	2	2	4	6	9	−3	6	
5	Marathón	8	1	2	5	8	12	−4	4	

=== Final ===
14 December 1988 1st leg	Olimpia	2–0	Real España	Tegucigalpa, Francisco Morazán
	Contreras; Flores			Stadium: Estadio Tiburcio Carías Andino; Referee: Gonzalo Tejada

24 December 1988 2nd leg	Real España	2–0 (a.e.t.)	Olimpia	San Pedro Sula, Cortés
	Anariba; Ávila			Stadium: Estadio Francisco Morazán; Referee: Rodolfo Martínez

Real España	Olimpia

GK	–	(Uruguay) Jorge López
DF	–	(Honduras) Marco Anariba
DF	–	(Honduras) Karl Roland
DF	–	(Honduras) Allan Costly
DF	–	(Honduras) Emilson Soto
MF	–	(Honduras) José Fúnez
MF	–	(Honduras) Luis Cálix
MF	–	(Uruguay) Carlos Reyes
MF	–	(Honduras) Nahamán González
FW	–	(Honduras) Juan Anariba	Substituted off
FW	–	(Uruguay) Rubén Alonso	Substituted off
Substitutions:
FW	–	(Honduras) Alex Ávila	Substituted on
MF	–	(Honduras) Carlos Caballero	Substituted on
Manager:
(Brazil) Flavio Ortega

GK	–	(Honduras) Óscar Banegas
DF	–	(Honduras) Daniel Zapata
DF	–	(Honduras) Danilo Galindo
DF	–	(Honduras) Alejandro Ruiz
DF	–	(Honduras) Rudy Williams
MF	–	(Honduras) Erick Fú Lanza	(red card) 87'
MF	–	(Honduras) Nahúm Espinoza	Substituted off
MF	–	(Uruguay) Vicente Viera
FW	–	(Uruguay) Juan Contreras
FW	–	(Honduras) Juan Flores
FW	–	(Honduras) Javier Flores	Substituted off
Substitutions:
FW	–	(Honduras) Eugenio Dolmo	Substituted on
MF	–	(Honduras) Fernando Tovar	Substituted on
Manager:
(Uruguay) Estanislao Malinowski

- Real España 2–2 Olimpia on aggregate. Real España champions on better regular season record.

Liga Nacional
1988–89 Champion
Real España
5th title

== Top scorers ==
- (Honduras) Miguel Mathews (Motagua) with 8 goals
- (Uruguay) Rubén Alonso (Real España) with 8 goals
- (Honduras) Carlos H. Lobo (Curacao) with 8 goals
- (Honduras) Raúl Centeno Gamboa (Platense) with 8 goals

== Squads ==
Curacao
(Honduras) Constantino Reyes	(Honduras) Calos Humberto "Papeto" Lobo	(Honduras) Eduardo Bennett
(Honduras) César Martínez	(Honduras) Edgar Murillo	(Honduras) Roberto "Muñiña" Escalante
(Honduras) Samuel Chávez	(Honduras) Iván Guerra	(Honduras) Francisco "Pancho" González
(Honduras) Nelson "Namasigüe" Guevara	(Honduras) Jeremías "Burrito" González	(Honduras) Marco Tulio "Pollo" Suazo
(Honduras) Juan Antonio "Zurdo" Aguilar
Marathón
(Honduras) Dangelo Bautista	(Honduras) Erasmo "Chícharo" Guerrero	(Honduras) Francisco Adelmo Herrera
(Honduras) José Luis "Joche" Alvarado	(Honduras) Porfirio Armando Betancourt	(Honduras) José Ulloa Villatoro
(Honduras) Eduardo Laing	(Honduras) Óscar Gerardo "Maradona" Cruz	(Honduras) Pedro Geovany Midence
(Honduras) Jorge Suamy Álvarez	(Honduras) José Manuel Enamorado Díaz	(Costa Rica) Jorge Chévez
(Honduras) Roy Arturo Padilla Bardales	(Honduras) Jorge Alberto "Cuca" Bueso Iglesias	(Paraguay) Luis Cornet
(Honduras) Neptally Turcios	(Honduras) Leonel Machado	(Honduras) Aparicio Colón
(Honduras) Ciro Paulino "Palic" Castillo
Motagua
(Honduras) Marvin Geovany "Mango" Henríquez	(Honduras) Miguel Antonio Mathews Sargent	(Honduras) Fabricio "Amapala" Pérez
(Honduras) Hernaín Arzú	(Honduras) Donaldo "Martillo" Guillén Reyes	(Honduras) Gilberto Yearwood
(Honduras) Juan Gómez Ortiz	(Honduras) José Mario "Kivo" Almendárez	(Brazil) Geraldo da Silva
Olimpia
(Honduras) Óscar Banegas	(Honduras) Belarmino Rivera	(Uruguay) Juan Carlos "Rata" Contreras
(Honduras) Juan Alberto Flores Maradiaga	(Honduras) Prudencio Norales	(Uruguay) Vicente Daniel Viera
(Paraguay) Ramón Fernández Riera	(Costa Rica) Jorge Manuel "Bugy" Ulate	(Honduras) Santos "Indio" Ruiz
(Honduras) Antonio "Flaco" Hernández	(Honduras) Danilo Galindo	(Honduras) Fernando Tovar
(Honduras) Eugenio Dolmo Flores	(Honduras) Alex Pineda Chacón	(Honduras) Raúl Martínez Sambulá
(Honduras) Javier Flores	(Uruguay) Luis Jaime	(Honduras) Patrocinio Sierra
(Honduras) Juan Carlos Pineda Chacón	(Honduras) Daniel Zapata	(Honduras) Rudy Alberto Williams
(Honduras) Nahúm Espinoza	(Honduras) Erick Fú Lanza	(Honduras) Darío Mejía
(Honduras) Juan Carlos Espinoza	(Honduras) Carlos "Gigio" Maldonado
Platense
(Honduras) Raúl Centeno Gamboa	(Honduras) Antonio "Machangay" Amaya López	(Honduras) Jorge Arita Neals
(Honduras) Fernando Nuila	(Honduras) Margarito Bernárdez
Real España
(Honduras) Julio César "El Tile" Arzú	(Honduras) Wilmer Enrique "Supermán" Cruz	(Honduras) José Mauricio "Guicho" Fúnez Barrientos
(Honduras) Geovany Gayle Alarcón	(Honduras) Ildefonso Bonilla	(Uruguay) Jorge López Silva
(Uruguay) Rubén Alonso	(Honduras) Nelson Benavídez	(Honduras) Esteban Pitío Centeno
(Honduras) Juan Ramón "Montuca" Castro	(Honduras) Edith Hernando Contreras	(Honduras) Carlos Fernando Landa
(Honduras) Allan Anthony Costly	(Honduras) Alex Geovany Ávila	(Honduras) Marco Antonio Anariba Zelaya
(Honduras) Nahamán Humberto González	(Honduras) Juan Manuel "Nito" Anariba	(Honduras) "Yuca" López
(Honduras) Karl Antonio Roland	(Uruguay) Enrique Daniel Uberty García	(Honduras) Edgardo Emilson Soto Fajardo
(Honduras) Rigoberto "Rigo" González	(Honduras) Luis "Gavilán" Cálix	(Honduras) Junior Rashford Costly
(Uruguay) Carlos Reyes	(Honduras) Carlos Orlando Caballero
Sula
(Honduras) Lorenzo Crisanto Batiz	(Honduras) Amílcar Lowe	(Honduras) Gregorio Flores
(Honduras) Mario Bustillo	(Honduras) Óscar "Tigre" Carbajal	(Honduras) Manuel Reyes Meraz
(Honduras) Fernando Nuila	(Honduras) Danilo "Pilo" Henríquez	(Honduras) Marco "Choreta" Ordóñez
(Honduras) Luis Alonso Zúniga	(Honduras) Carlos Aguilar Bonilla	(Honduras) Dennis Caballero
(Honduras) Óscar "Pito Loco" López	(Honduras) Catarino Amaya	(Honduras) Marco "Toñito" Gómez
(Honduras) Rigoberto Castillo	(Honduras) Emilio "Chespirito" Hernández	(Costa Rica) Johnny Williams
(Honduras) José Luis "Pili" Aguirre	(Honduras) Roger Javier Valladares	(Costa Rica) Mauricio Camacho
Universidad
(Costa Rica) Gerardo "Cholo" Villalobos	(Honduras) César Adonis Flores	(Honduras) Roberto "Chele" Barahona
(Honduras) Fraterno Calderon	(Honduras) Salomón Nazzar	(Honduras) Juan José Craniotis
(Argentina) Oswaldo "Che" Altamirano	(Honduras) Iván Canales	(Honduras) Iván Ponce
(Honduras) Jorge "Chino" Euceda	(Uruguay) Roberto Brites
Victoria
(Honduras) Jorge Alberto "Camioncito" Duarte	(Honduras) Jorge Alberto "Bala" Bennett	(Honduras) Renán "Chimbo" Aguilera Contreras
(Honduras) Carlos Roberto "Condorito" Mejía Alvarenga	(Honduras) Ramón Berckling
Vida
(Honduras) Raúl David Fúnez	(Honduras) Wilson Omar Reyes Martínez	(Honduras) Rudy Pine Pack
(Honduras) José Emilio Martínez	(Honduras) Jorge Ernesto Pineda	(Honduras) Rolando "Pipo" Valladares Laguna
(Honduras) José Danilo Carías Figueroa	(Honduras) René Arturo David "Pupa" Martínez	(Honduras) Carlos Ramírez

== Known results ==
=== Round 1 ===
Victoria	1–0	Curacao
Bennett

La Ceiba
27 February 1988

Marathón	0–0	Motagua

San Pedro Sula

=== Relegation playoffs ===
Curacao	1–2	Sula

Tegucigalpa

Sula	0–0	Vida

San Pedro Sula

=== Pentagonal ===
22 October 1988

Real España	0–1	Motagua

San Pedro Sula
26 October 1988

Marathón	0–0	Real España

San Pedro Sula
27 October 1988

Olimpia	0–0	Motagua

Tegucigalpa
29 October 1988

Marathón	1–2	Olimpia
Cornet		Sierra; Fernández

San Pedro Sula
30 October 1988

Vida	1–2	Motagua

La Ceiba
3 November 1988

Motagua	0–2	Marathón
		Machado; Castillo

Tegucigalpa
6 November 1988

Olimpia	0–0	Real España

Tegucigalpa
10 November 1988

Marathón	0–0	Motagua

San Pedro Sula
19 November 1988

Motagua	1–2	Real España

Tegucigalpa
23 November 1988

Real España	0–0	Olimpia

San Pedro Sula
30 November 1988

Real España	3–2	Marathón
Uberty; Alonzo; Cálix		Machado; Cornet

San Pedro Sula
30 November 1988

Motagua	1–1	Olimpia
Pérez		Contreras

Tegucigalpa
7 December 1988

Olimpia	2–1	Marathón
Contreras; Flores		Laing

Tegucigalpa

=== Unknown rounds ===
2 March 1988

Real España	2–1	Sula

San Pedro Sula
3 March 1988

Olimpia	1–0	Vida

Tegucigalpa
6 March 1988

Vida	1–0	Universidad

La Ceiba
12 March 1988

Real España	1–2	Vida
Uberti

San Pedro Sula
20 March 1988

Vida	4–1	Platense

La Ceiba
24 March 1988

Olimpia	2–0	Curacao

Tegucigalpa
26 March 1988

Real España	1–1	Marathón

San Pedro Sula
27 March 1988

Vida	1–0	Victoria

La Ceiba
20 July 1988

Marathón	2–0	Curacao

San Pedro Sula
4 August 1988

Curacao	1–1	Sula

Tegucigalpa
31 August 1988

Sula	1–1	Universidad

San Pedro Sula
17 September 1988

Platense	1–0	Victoria

San Pedro Sula
18 September 1988

Vida	0–1	Marathón
		Machado

La Ceiba
29 September 1988

Motagua	1–1	Curacao

Tegucigalpa
1 October 1988

Sula	1–3	Olimpia

San Pedro Sula
13 October 1988

Real España	6–2	Sula
Anariba; Landa; Chavarría		Valladares

San Pedro Sula

Motagua	3–0	Universidad
Reyes; Yearwood

Tegucigalpa
