= Carlos Pavón =

Honduran footballer (born 1973)

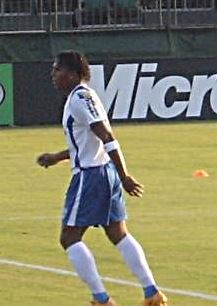

Personal information
- Full name: Carlos Alberto Pavón Plummer
- Date of birth: 9 October 1973 (age 53)
- Place of birth: El Progreso, Honduras
- Height: 1.78 m (5 ft 10 in)
- Position: Striker

Youth career
- 1990–1992: Real España Reservas

Senior career*
Years	Team	Apps	(Gls)
1992–1997	Real España	74	(22)
1994–1995	→ Toluca (loan)	17	(7)
1995	→ San Luis (loan)	11	(4)
1996	→ Valladolid (loan)	9	(0)
1996–1997	Correcaminos	20	(14)
1997–1998	Necaxa	25	(7)
1998–2000	Atlético Celaya	57	(34)
2000–2001	Morelia	28	(14)
2001	Udinese	7	(1)
2002–2003	Napoli	12	(0)
2003	Real España	18	(8)
2003–2004	Morelia	16	(6)
2004	Deportivo Cali	14	(3)
2004–2005	Cruz Azul	13	(3)
2005–2006	Comunicaciones	34	(19)
2006–2007	Real España	38	(17)
2007	LA Galaxy	18	(3)
2007–2009	Real España	25	(13)
2009	Necaxa	9	(0)
2009–2013	Real España	54	(21)
Total		488	(196)

International career^{‡}
1993–2010	Honduras	101	(57)
- * Club domestic league appearances and goals as of 13 January 2022 ‡ National team caps and goals as of 6 June 2010

Carlos Alberto Pavón Plummer (born 9 October 1973) is a Honduran former professional footballer who played as a striker. He is regarded as one of the best Honduran footballers in history, and by most as the nation's greatest player ever.

Most prominently affiliated with Real España, he has made over 200 appearances for Los Aurinegros in the Liga Nacional de Fútbol de Honduras, and is Honduras' all-time leading national team goalscorer.

== Club career ==
Born in El Progreso, Yoro, to Blanca Nieves Pavón Macedo and Costa Rican footballer Allard Plummer, Pavón began his career at the age of 18 in his native Honduras with Real España on 30 May 1992 against Platense in the 1992 Honduran Cup, the final score was 1-1. While with Real España, Pavón won four Honduran league championships, as well as leading the league in scoring.

=== Mexican years ===
Pavón then played in Mexico for seven successive years, except for a short stint in Spain. He played for Morelia in the Mexican Primera División, winning the 2000 Clausura with the club. He has also played for Toluca, San Luis, Correcaminos, Necaxa, Cruz Azul, and Celaya, where he led the Mexican Second Division in scoring.

=== Europe ===
He has played in Italy in Serie A for both Udinese and Napoli from 2001 to 2003 and in Spain's first division with Real Valladolid (1995).

=== Major League Soccer ===
On 19 June 2007, he signed a deal to play for the Los Angeles Galaxy. He scored twice in the away match against New York Red Bulls on 18 August 2007, both coming from David Beckham assists. The match attracted 66,000 fans, the highest attendance ever recorded for a Bulls game. Pavón was waived at the end of the season.

Despite other offers from MLS teams, he went back to Real Club España in Honduras for 2008. After being released, he signed on with the struggling Club Necaxa of the Primera División de México. He made his debut for Necaxa on 1 March 2009 after only one training session with the club. He started the match and assisted both goals in their 2–2 draw with Club Santos Laguna.

After trying his luck at Club Necaxa he returned to Real España and retired after the 2012 Clausura to become assistant coach at the club as well as a football commentator.

== International career ==
Pavón made his debut for Honduras in a July 1993 CONCACAF Gold Cup match against the USA and has earned a total of 101 caps, scoring a Honduran record 57 goals. He has represented his country in 37 FIFA World Cup qualification matches and played at the 2008 Summer Olympics and in only 1 game at the 2010 FIFA World Cup.

He also played at the 1995, 1999, 2001 and 2009 UNCAF Nations Cups as well as at the 1993, 1998, 2000 and 2007 CONCACAF Gold Cups.

His final international was a June 2010 FIFA World Cup match against Chile. After participating in the World Cup through pain, it was discovered Pavón had a hernia. His future in football was in limbo, as a result of the injury.

== Career statistics ==
=== Club ===
Club performance			League		Cup		League Cup		Continental		Total	
Season	Club	League	Apps	Goals	Apps	Goals	Apps	Goals	Apps	Goals	Apps	Goals
Honduras			League		Cup		League Cup		North America		Total	
1992–93	Real España	Honduran national league	31	10	6	3			2	1	39	14
1993–94	Real España	Honduran national league	23	4	7	6					30	10
1994–95	Real España	Honduran national league	3	1							10	7
1995–96	Real España	Honduran national league	9	1							9	1
1996–97	Real España	Honduran national league	8	6							8	6
2003–04	Real España	Honduran national league	18	8							18	8
2006–07	Real España	Honduran national league	38	17							38	17
2007–08	Real España	Honduran national league	12	5							17	5
2008–09	Real España	Honduran national league	13	8							13	8
2009–10	Real España	Honduran national league	27	14					4	2	31	16
2011–12	Real España	Honduran national league	27	7					4	3	31	10
Total	Honduras		209	81	13	9			10	6	244	102
Career total			209	81	13	9			10	6	244	102

=== International ===
Appearances and goals by national team and year
National team	Year	Apps	Goals
Honduras	1993	1	0
Honduras	1994	2	0
Honduras	1995	4	3
Honduras	1996	17	6
Honduras	1998	3	1
Honduras	1999	7	4
Honduras	2000	13	14
Honduras	2001	12	9
Honduras	2002	1	2
Honduras	2004	11	2
Honduras	2007	7	7
Honduras	2009	17	9
Honduras	2010	5	1
Total		101	57

Scores and results list Honduras' goal tally first, score column indicates score after each Pavón goal.

List of international goals scored by Carlos Pavón
No.	Date	Venue	Opponent	Score	Result	Competition	Ref.
1	29 November 1995	Estadio Óscar Quiteño, Santa Ana, El Salvador	Panama	2–0	2–0	1995 UNCAF Nations Cup	
2	10 December 1995	Estadio Cuscatlán, San Salvador, El Salvador	Guatemala	2–0	3–0	1995 UNCAF Nations Cup	
3	10 December 1995	Estadio Cuscatlán, San Salvador, El Salvador	Guatemala	3–0	3–0	1995 UNCAF Nations Cup	
4	24 July 1996	Estadio Nacional, Tegucigalpa, Honduras	Panama	1–0	1–1	Friendly	
5	21 August 1996	Estadio Cuscatlán, San Salvador, El Salvador	El Salvador	1–0	2–1	Friendly	
6	25 August 1996	Estadio Nacional, Tegucigalpa, Honduras	Cuba	3–0	4–0	Friendly	
7	21 September 1996	Estadio Morazán, San Pedro Sula, Honduras	Mexico	1–0	2–1	1998 FIFA World Cup qualification	
8	21 October 1996	Estadio Nacional, Tegucigalpa, Honduras	El Salvador	1–0	1–1	Friendly	
9	17 November 1996	Estadio Morazán, San Pedro Sula, Honduras	Saint Vincent and the Grenadines	4–0	11–3	1998 FIFA World Cup qualification	
10	1 February 1998	Oakland Coliseum, Oakland, United States	Trinidad and Tobago	1–2	1–3	1998 CONCACAF Gold Cup	
11	21 March 1999	Estadio Nacional, San José, Costa Rica	Costa Rica	1–0	1–0	1999 UNCAF Nations Cup	
12	26 March 1999	Estadio Nacional, San José, Costa Rica	Costa Rica	2–1	2–1	1999 UNCAF Nations Cup	
13	21 May 1999	Miami Orange Bowl, Miami, United States	Haiti	1–0	2–0	Friendly	
14	21 May 1999	Miami Orange Bowl, Miami, United States	Haiti	2–0	2–0	Friendly	
15	9 February 2000	Estadio Morazán, San Pedro Sula, Honduras	El Salvador	1–0	5–1	Friendly	
16	14 February 2000	Miami Orange Bowl, Miami, United States	Jamaica	1–0	2–0	2002 CONCACAF Gold Cup	
17	16 February 2000	Miami Orange Bowl, Miami, United States	Colombia	1–0	2–0	2002 CONCACAF Gold Cup	
18	19 February 2000	Miami Orange Bowl, Miami, United States	Peru	2–4	3–5	2002 CONCACAF Gold Cup	
19	7 May 2000	Estadio Nacional, Tegucigalpa, Honduras	Panama	1–0	3–1	2002 FIFA World Cup qualification	
20	7 May 2000	Estadio Nacional, Tegucigalpa, Honduras	Panama	2–1	3–1	2002 FIFA World Cup qualification	
21	3 June 2000	Estadio Morazán, San Pedro Sula, Honduras	Haiti	3–0	4–0	2002 FIFA World Cup qualification	
22	16 July 2000	Estadio Cuscatlán, San Salvador, El Salvador	El Salvador	3–1	5–2	2002 FIFA World Cup qualification	
23	16 July 2000	Estadio Cuscatlán, San Salvador, El Salvador	El Salvador	4–1	5–2	2002 FIFA World Cup qualification	
24	26 August 2000	Estadio Nacional, Tegucigalpa, Honduras	Saint Vincent and the Grenadines	1–0	6–0	2002 FIFA World Cup qualification	
25	26 August 2000	Estadio Nacional, Tegucigalpa, Honduras	Saint Vincent and the Grenadines	5–0	6–0	2002 FIFA World Cup qualification	
26	2 September 2000	Estadio Olímpico Metropolitano, San Pedro Sula, Honduras	El Salvador	1–0	5–0	2002 FIFA World Cup qualification	
27	2 September 2000	Estadio Olímpico Metropolitano, San Pedro Sula, Honduras	El Salvador	2–0	5–0	2002 FIFA World Cup qualification	
28	2 September 2000	Estadio Olímpico Metropolitano, San Pedro Sula, Honduras	El Salvador	4–0	5–0	2002 FIFA World Cup qualification	
29	25 May 2001	Estadio Olímpico Metropolitano, San Pedro Sula, Honduras	Nicaragua	2–1	10–2	2001 UNCAF Nations Cup	
30	25 May 2001	Estadio Olímpico Metropolitano, San Pedro Sula, Honduras	Nicaragua	3–1	10–2	2001 UNCAF Nations Cup	
31	25 May 2001	Estadio Olímpico Metropolitano, San Pedro Sula, Honduras	Nicaragua	10–1	10–2	2001 UNCAF Nations Cup	
32	16 June 2001	Hasely Crawford Stadium, Port of Spain, Trinidad and Tobago	Trinidad and Tobago	1–0	4–2	2002 FIFA World Cup qualification	
33	20 June 2001	Estadio Morazán, San Pedro Sula, Honduras	Mexico	1–0	3–1	2002 FIFA World Cup qualification	
34	20 June 2001	Estadio Morazán, San Pedro Sula, Honduras	Mexico	2–0	3–1	2002 FIFA World Cup qualification	
35	20 June 2001	Estadio Morazán, San Pedro Sula, Honduras	Mexico	3–0	3–1	2002 FIFA World Cup qualification	
36	1 September 2001	RFK Stadium, Washington, D.C., United States	United States	2–1	3–2	2002 FIFA World Cup qualification	
37	2 May 2002	Kobe Universiade Memorial Stadium, Kobe, Japan	Japan	2–1	3–3	Friendly	
38	2 May 2002	Kobe Universiade Memorial Stadium, Kobe, Japan	Japan	3–2	3–3	Friendly	
39	28 April 2004	Lockhart Stadium, Fort Lauderdale, United States	Ecuador	1–0	1–1	Friendly	
40	19 June 2004	Estadio Olímpico Metropolitano, San Pedro Sula, Honduras	Netherlands Antilles	4–0	4–0	2006 FIFA World Cup qualification	
41	19 April 2007	Estadio Nilmo Edwards, La Ceiba, Honduras	Haiti	1–0	1–3	Friendly	
42	25 May 2007	Estadio Metropolitano, Mérida, Venezuela	Venezuela	1–2	1–2	Friendly	
43	13 June 2007	Reliant Stadium, Houston, United States	Cuba	1–0	5–0	2007 CONCACAF Gold Cup	
44	13 June 2007	Reliant Stadium, Houston, United States	Cuba	2–0	5–0	2007 CONCACAF Gold Cup	
45	13 June 2007	Reliant Stadium, Houston, United States	Cuba	3–0	5–0	2007 CONCACAF Gold Cup	
46	13 June 2007	Reliant Stadium, Houston, United States	Cuba	4–0	5–0	2007 CONCACAF Gold Cup	
47	17 June 2007	Reliant Stadium, Houston, United States	Guadeloupe	1–2	1–2	2007 CONCACAF Gold Cup	
48	18 January 2009	Lockhart Stadium, Fort Lauderdale, United States	Chile	1–0	2–0	Friendly	
49	26 January 2009	Estadio Nacional, Tegucigalpa, Honduras	El Salvador	1–0	2–0	2009 UNCAF Nations Cup	
50	28 March 2009	Hasely Crawford Stadium, Port of Spain, Trinidad and Tobago	Trinidad and Tobago	1–0	1–1	2010 FIFA World Cup qualification	
51	1 April 2009	Estadio Olímpico Metropolitano, San Pedro Sula, Honduras	Mexico	2–0	3–1	2010 FIFA World Cup qualification	
52	10 June 2009	Estadio Olímpico Metropolitano, San Pedro Sula, Honduras	El Salvador	1–0	1–0	2010 FIFA World Cup qualification	
53	12 August 2009	Estadio Olímpico Metropolitano, San Pedro Sula, Honduras	Costa Rica	2–0	4–0	2010 FIFA World Cup qualification	
54	5 September 2009	Estadio Olímpico Metropolitano, San Pedro Sula, Honduras	Trinidad and Tobago	1–0	4–1	2010 FIFA World Cup qualification	
55	5 September 2009	Estadio Olímpico Metropolitano, San Pedro Sula, Honduras	Trinidad and Tobago	2–0	4–1	2010 FIFA World Cup qualification	
56	14 October 2009	Estadio Cuscatlán, San Salvador, El Salvador	El Salvador	1–0	1–0	2010 FIFA World Cup qualification	
57	23 January 2010	Home Depot Center, Carson, United States	United States	1–0	3–1	Friendly	

== Personal life ==
He is the son of Costa Rican Allard Plummer, who played for Marathón in the 1970s and Blanca Nieves Pavón Macedo. He is married to Emy Diana James de Pavón and they have two sons, Carlos and André. His son Carlos Alberto Plummer James was enlisted by Real España in 2011.

Pavón also tried his luck on the music scene, but without major success. He was selected by UNICEF to for their campaign to prevent violence against women.

== Honours ==
Real Espana

- Liga Profesional de Honduras: 1993–94, 2003–04 A, 2006–07 C, 2010–11 A
- Honduran Cup: 1992

Monarcas Morelia

- Liga MX: Invierno 2000

Honduras

- Copa Centroamericana: 1993, 1995

Individual

- Honduras Medal Of Order: 1994
- Mexico Primera División A Verano Top Scorer: 1997 (shared with Ángel Lemus)
- Liga Nacional de Honduras Golden Boot: 2006–07 C
- CONCACAF Gold Cup Golden Boot: 2007
- CONCACAF Gold Cup All-Star Team: 2007
- Honduran Footballer of the Year: 2009
- IFFHS Most Popular Player Award: 2009

Records

- Honduras All-time Top Scorer: 58 goals
- Real España All-time Top Scorer: 72 goals

== See also ==
- List of men's footballers with 100 or more international caps
