= Nahamán González =

Honduran footballer (born 1967)

Personal information
- Full name: Nahamán Humberto González Avila
- Date of birth: 23 June 1967 (age 59)
- Place of birth: , Honduras
- Position: Midfielder

Senior career*
Years	Team	Apps	(Gls)
1988–1993	Real España		
1993–1994	Herediano		
1995–1997	Alajuelense		
1997	→ Olimpia (loan)		
1998–1999	Santa Bárbara		
1999–2000	Marathón		

International career
1991–1996	Honduras	14	(0)
- * Club domestic league appearances and goals

Nahamán Humberto González Avila (born 23 June 1967) is a retired Honduran football player.

== Club career ==
Nicknamed el Constructor, González started his career at Real España and spent 6 years in Costa Rican football playing for Herediano, Alajuelense and Santa Bárbara and scoring 5 goals in 144 matches. He won the Costa Rican league title with Liga in the 1995/96 season as well as in 1996/97 but during that latter season he was loaned 5 months to Olimpia, winning another league title with them.

== International career ==
González made his debut for Honduras in a May 1991 UNCAF Nations Cup match and has earned a total of 14 caps, scoring no goals. He has represented his country in 1 FIFA World Cup qualification match and played at the 1991, and 1995 UNCAF Nations Cups, as well as at the 1991 CONCACAF Gold Cup.

His final international was an August 1996 friendly match against Cuba.

== Honours and awards ==
=== Club ===
C.D. Real Espana

- Liga Profesional de Honduras (2): 1988–89, 1990–91
- Honduran Cup: (1): 1992

C.D. Olimpia

- Liga Profesional de Honduras (1): 1996–97
- Honduran Supercup: (1): 1997

=== Country ===
Honduras

- Copa Centroamericana (1): 1995
