= Wilmer Cruz =

Honduran footballer and manager (born 1965)

Personal information
- Full name: Wilmer Enrique Cruz Paredes
- Date of birth: 18 December 1965 (age 60)
- Place of birth: Santa Cruz de Yojoa, Honduras
- Position: Goalkeeper

Team information
- Current team: Victoria (Manager)

Senior career*
Years	Team	Apps	(Gls)
1985–1990	Real España	56	(0)
1990–1991	Platense	28	(0)
1991–1994	Real España	58	(0)
1994–1996	Motagua	42	(0)
1997	Independiente	15	(0)
1996–1999	Real España	15	(0)
2000	Vida	9	(0)
2000	Savio	18	(0)
2001	Victoria	3	(0)
2001–2002	Savio	35	(0)

International career
1991–2000	Honduras	63	(0)

Managerial career
- 2003: Savio
- 2011: Atlético Municipal
- 2011–2012: Parrillas One
- 2012: Atlético Municipal
- 2014–2015: Honduras Progreso
- 2016: Juticalpa
- 2017: Honduras Progreso
- 2019: Juticalpa
- 2019-: Victoria
- * Club domestic league appearances and goals

Wilmer Enrique Cruz Paredes (born 18 December 1965) is a Honduran football manager and former player who manages Victoria.

== Club career ==
Nicknamed Pájaro (Bird) and Supermán, Cruz played 129 league matches for Real C.D. España and also had spells with Platense F.C., F.C. Motagua and Deportes Savio as well as short stints with C.D.S. Vida, Independiente Villela and C.D. Victoria. He played his final league game in January 2001 for Savio against Olimpia.

In September 1999, he was said to be interested to play in Costa Rica but would have to withdraw his candidacy to become mayor of his hometown, Santa Cruz de Yojoa.

== International career ==
Cruz made his debut for Honduras in a May 1991 UNCAF Nations Cup match against Panama and has earned a total of 63 caps, scoring no goals. He has represented his country in 16 FIFA World Cup qualification matches and played at the 1991, 1993, 1995 and 1999 UNCAF Nations Cups as well as at the 1991, 1993, 1996 and 2000 CONCACAF Gold Cups.

His final international was a May 2000 FIFA World Cup qualification match against Panama.

== Managerial career ==
After finishing his playing career with Savio, he became in charge of the team in 2003. In May 2011, he was manager of hometown club Atlético Municipal. Cruz resigned as coach of second division Parrillas One in February 2012. In February 2013, he was named manager of Honduras Progreso, succeeding Gilberto Machado.

On 19 February 2019, Cruz was once again appointed as manager of Juticalpa.

=== C.D. Victoria ===
On 21 May 2019, it was announced that Cruz was named manager of Victoria in the Honduran second division.

== Honours ==
Real Espana

- Liga Profesional de Honduras: 1988–89, 1993–94
- Honduran Cup: 1992

Honduras

- Copa Centroamericana: 1993, 1995
