= 1995 UNCAF Nations Cup =

Football competition in Central America

Tournament details
- Host country: El Salvador
- Teams: 7 (from 1 sub-confederation)

Final positions
- Champions: Honduras (2nd title)
- Runners-up: Guatemala
- Third place: El Salvador
- Fourth place: Costa Rica

Tournament statistics
- Matches played: 12
- Goals scored: 28 (2.33 per match)
- Top scorer(s): (Panama) Walter Pino (4 goals)

Six national football teams from Central America competed in the 1995 UNCAF Nations Cup (Copa Centroamericana). The winning team was the defending champions Honduras, which defeated Guatemala in the final for its second title.

== Preliminary round ==
22 October 1995
EST
1st leg

Panama	2–0	Nicaragua
Pino 67'; Medina 89'

Estadio Municipal de Balboa, Panama City, Panama
Attendance: 1,500
Referee: Olger Mejías (CRC)
29 October 1995
CST
2nd leg

Nicaragua	0–5	Panama
		Sánchez 18'; Pino 48', 50', 62'; Quiroz 75'

Estadio Cacique Diriangén, Diriamba, Nicaragua
Attendance: 5,000
Referee: Ramón Méndez (CRC)

== Participating teams ==
6 UNCAF Teams participated in the tournament

- Belize (Debut)
- Costa Rica
- El Salvador (Hosts)
- Guatemala
- Honduras (Defending Champions)
- Panama (Preliminary round) winners

== Stadium ==
1995 UNCAF Nations Cup is located in El Salvador	San Salvador	Santa Ana
1995 UNCAF Nations Cup is located in El Salvador	Estadio Cuscatlán	Estadio Óscar Quiteño
1995 UNCAF Nations Cup is located in El Salvador	Capacity: 53,400	Capacity: 17,500

== First round ==
=== Group A ===
played in San Salvador

Pos	Team	Pld	W	D	L	GF	GA	GD	Pts	Qualification
1	El Salvador	2	2	0	0	5	1	+4	6	Semifinals
2	Costa Rica	2	1	0	1	3	3	0	3	Semifinals
3	Belize	2	0	0	2	1	5	−4	0	

29 November 1995

El Salvador	3–0	Belize
Cienfuegos 55'; Osorio 58' (pen.); Arce 76'

1 December 1995

Costa Rica	2–1	Belize
Fonseca 8'; Wright 88'		McCaulay 27'

3 December 1995

El Salvador	2–1	Costa Rica
Osorio 62'; Cienfuegos 81'		Morales 32'

=== Group B ===
played in Santa Ana

Pos	Team	Pld	W	D	L	GF	GA	GD	Pts	Qualification
1	Honduras	2	2	0	0	4	0	+4	6	Semifinals
2	Guatemala	2	1	0	1	1	2	−1	3	Semifinals
3	Panama	2	0	0	2	0	3	−3	0	

29 November 1995

Honduras	2–0	Panama
Chacón 25'; Pavón 75'

1 December 1995

Guatemala	1–0	Panama
Rodas 21'

3 December 1995

Honduras	2–0	Guatemala
Suazo 47'; Núñez 89'

== Knockout stage ==
Semi-finals
7 December - San Salvador
Honduras	1 (4)
Costa Rica	1 (2)
7 December - San Salvador
El Salvador	0
Guatemala	1

Final
10 December - San Salvador
Honduras	3
Guatemala	0
Third place
10 December - San Salvador
El Salvador	2
Costa Rica	1

=== Semi-finals ===
7 December 1995

Honduras	1–1 4–2 (Pen.)	Costa Rica
Williams 55'		Fonseca 60'

San Salvador

7 December 1995

El Salvador	0–1	Guatemala
		Rodas 14'

San Salvador

=== Third-place match ===
10 December 1995

El Salvador	2–1	Costa Rica
Arce 18'; Rodríguez 45'		Fonseca 72'

San Salvador

=== Final ===
10 December 1995
CST
Final

Guatemala	0–3	Honduras
		Núñez 1'; Pavón 25', 57'

Estadio Cuscatlán
San Salvador, El Salvador
Attendance: 10,000

Guatemala	Honduras

GK	–	Edgar Estrada
DF	–	German Ruano
DF	–	Erick Miranda
DF	–	Iván León	Substituted off
MF	–	Martín Machón
MF	–	Julio Girón
MF	–	Juan Funes
MF	–	Jorge Rodas
MF	–	Édgar Valencia	Substituted off
FW	–	Julio Rodas
FW	–	Roberto Montepeque	Substituted off
Substitutions:
FW	–	Edgar Arriaza	Substituted on
MF	–	Maynor Castro	Substituted on
FW	–	Sergio Díaz	Substituted on
Manager:
(Guatemala) Jorge Roldán

GK	–	Wilmer Cruz
DF	–	Hernaín Arzú
DF	–	Raúl Sambulá
DF	–	José Fernández
MF	–	Martín Castro
MF	–	Nahamán González
MF	–	Rodolfo Smith
MF	–	Christian Santamaría	Substituted off
MF	–	Jorge Pineda	Substituted off
FW	–	Carlos Pavón	Substituted off
FW	–	Milton Núñez
Substitutions:
MF	–	Edgar Sierra	Substituted on
DF	–	Rudy Williams	Substituted on
MF	–	José Romero	Substituted on
Manager:
(Honduras) Carlos Cruz

== Champions ==
1995 UNCAF Nations Cup winner

Honduras
Second title

- Honduras, Guatemala and El Salvador qualified automatically for 1996 CONCACAF Gold Cup.
