= Marco Anariba =

Honduran footballer (born 1968)

Personal information
- Full name: Marco Antonio Anariba Zelaya
- Date of birth: 18 February 1968 (age 58)
- Place of birth: El Progreso, Honduras
- Position: Defender

Senior career*
Years	Team	Apps	(Gls)
1985–1996	Real España		
1996–1997	Motagua		(3)
1997–1998	Universidad		

International career
1991–1993	Honduras	26	(3)
- * Club domestic league appearances and goals

Marco Antonio Anariba Zelaya (born 18 February 1968) is a retired Honduran football player who made his name with the national team in the early 1990s.

== Club career ==
Nicknamed Maco, Anariba made his debut for Real España in 1985 and spent 11 years with them. He scored 2 goals for the club in a 1991 CONCACAF Champions' Cup game against Belizean outfit Acros Verdes. He also played for Honduran clubs Motagua for whom he scored 3 goals and Universidad.

In 1990, Anariba was set to join Mexican side Santos Laguna but newly appointed Honduran coach "Chelato Uclés" signed compatriot Tomás Róchez instead to join a team including Eugenio Dolmo Flores and Luis "Gavilán" Cálix.

He retired at 30.

== International career ==
A left-sided defender, Anariba made his debut for Honduras in a May 1991 UNCAF Nations Cup match against Panama and has earned a total of 25 caps, scoring 3 goals. He has represented his country in 10 FIFA World Cup qualification matches and played at the 1991 and 1993 UNCAF Nations Cups as well as at the 1991 CONCACAF Gold Cup.

His final international was a May 1993 FIFA World Cup qualification match against El Salvador.

=== International goals ===
Scores and results list Honduras' goal tally first.

N.	Date	Venue	Opponent	Score	Result	Competition
1.	3 July 1991	Memorial Coliseum, Los Angeles, United States	Mexico	1–0	1-1	1991 CONCACAF Gold Cup
2.	28 November 1992	Estadio Tiburcio Carías Andino, Tegucigalpa, Honduras	Saint Vincent and the Grenadines	4–0	4-0	1994 FIFA World Cup qualification
3.	9 May 1993	Estadio Cuscatlán, San Salvador, El Salvador	El Salvador	1–2	1-2	1994 FIFA World Cup qualification

== Personal life ==
Anariba is married to Waldina, who is a lawyer, and lives in El Progreso where he runs a football school. In summer 2010, he got injured in a veteran league match and after he was treated by a doctor he suffered from thrombosis. His health deteriorated due to the medical malpractice and was bedridden for 30 days, the blood clots almost cost him his left leg. Real España later played a match to raise funds to cover his medical costs.

His brother Juan Manuel also played for Real España.

== Honours and awards ==
=== Club ===
C.D. Real Espana

- Liga Profesional de Honduras (3): 1988–89, 1990–91, 1993–94
- Honduran Cup: (1): 1992

=== Country ===
Honduras

- Copa Centroamericana (1): 1993,
