= Néstor Matamala =

Chilean football manager (1940–2023)

Personal information
- Full name: Néstor Antonio Rodrigo Matamala Molina
- Date of birth: 13 October 1940
- Place of birth: Cholchol, Chile
- Date of death: 6 May 2023 (aged 82)
- Place of death: Portugal

Managerial career
- Years: Team
- 1975: Izabal
- 1977: Broncos
- 1978–1979: Motagua
- 1980–1982: Real España
- 1982–1984: Platense
- 1986–1987: Olimpia
- 1987–1988: Sula
- 1988–1989: Marathón
- 1990: Motagua
- 1991–1992: Águila
- 1992–1993: Real España
- 1993: El Salvador (caretaker)
- 1995–1997: Independiente

Néstor Rodrigo Matamala Molina (13 October 1940 – 6 May 2023) was a Chilean football manager and youth football team owner and teacher/trainer for Academia de Fútbol Nestor R. Matamala and FC Juventud Henerma.

== Managerial career ==
Néstor Rodrigo Matamala has coached a number of Honduran teams, including Real C.D. España, Platense F.C., C.D. Olimpia and F.C. Motagua. He coached the Izabal de Puerto Barrios of Guatemala and C.D. Águila of El Salvador. He had a Soccer Academy and the name of his Soccer Team was FC Juventud Henerma. He had joined Alliance with Marcet Football University in Spain and was in the process of joining alliances with other soccer teams from Europe and South America. In May 1993, he was caretaker manager for the El Salvador national team's last game during World Cup 1994 qualifying campaign.

Matamala won three league titles of the Honduran Liga Nacional with Motagua (1978–79), Real España (1980–81) and Olimpia (1986–87).

== Death ==
Matamala died on 6 May 2023, at the age of 82 on a trip to Portugal.

== Honours ==
Motagua

- Honduran Liga Nacional: 1978–79

Real España

- Honduran Liga Nacional: 1980–81

Olimpia

- Honduran Liga Nacional: 1986–87
