= Mauricio Fúnez =

Honduran footballer (born 1959)

Personal information
- Full name: José Mauricio Fúnez Barrientos
- Date of birth: 10 March 1959 (age 67)
- Place of birth: Honduras
- Position: Midfielder

Senior career*
Years	Team	Apps	(Gls)
1981–1982	Independiente	27	(4)
1982–1983	Olimpia	22	(3)
1983–1997	Real España	296	(6)

International career^{‡}
1991–1993	Honduras	28	(0)
- * Club domestic league appearances and goals as of 1997 ‡ National team caps and goals as of 1997

José Mauricio Fúnez Barrientos (born 10 March 1959), nicknamed El Güicho, is a retired Honduran football midfielder.

== Club career ==
The moustached Fúnez played most of his career for Real España, whom he also skippered, in the Honduran Liga Nacional. He also played for Independiente Villela and C.D. Olimpia.

== International career ==
Fúnez arrived late at the internationals scene, since he only made his debut for Honduras in a May 1991 UNCAF Nations Cup match against Panama and has earned a total of 28 caps, scoring no goals. He has represented his country in 4 FIFA World Cup qualification matches and played at the 1991 and 1993 UNCAF Nations Cups, as well as at the 1991 CONCACAF Gold Cup.

His final international was a May 1993 FIFA World Cup qualification match against Mexico.

== Honours and awards ==
=== Club ===
C.D. Real Espana

- Liga Profesional de Honduras (3): 1988–89, 1990–91, 1993–94
- Honduran Cup: (1): 1992

C.D. Olimpia

- Liga Profesional de Honduras (1): 1982–83

=== Country ===
Honduras

- Copa Centroamericana (1): 1993,
