= Geovanny Castro =

Honduran footballer (born 1969)

Personal information
- Full name: Edwin Geovanny Castro
- Date of birth: 24 June 1969 (age 57)
- Place of birth: Honduras
- Position: Forward

Youth career
- Estudiantes Juvenil

Senior career*
Years	Team	Apps	(Gls)
1987–1997	Motagua		(40)
1989–1990	→ Súper Estrella (loan)		(5)
1997–1998	Marathón		(5)
1998–1999	Vida		(5)
1999–2000	Federal		(1)
2000–2001	Broncos		(4)
2023-	Tintoralba Higueruela		

International career
- Honduras U23
1991	Honduras	1	(0)
- * Club domestic league appearances and goals

Edwin Geovanny Castro (born 24 June 1969) is a retired Honduran footballer who played as a striker. He played most of his career for Motagua scoring 40 goals.

== Club career ==
Nicknamed El Venado (The Deer) because of his pace, the long-haired Castro also played for Súper Estrella, Marathón, Vida, Federal and Broncos for he scored 60 goals in total. He was the national league top goalscorer in 1995–96

== International career ==
Castro played against Panama at the 1991 UNCAF Nations Cup.

== Retirement ==
Castro was assistant to coach Hernaín Arzú at lower league club Venado-Barcelona. In 2010, he worked as a groundsman at the national stadium.

== Personal life ==
He is married and has 6 children: Nicole, Charito, Melanie, Génesis, Kevin and Nahamán.

== Honours ==
=== Motagua ===
- Honduran National League: 1

1992

- Top goalscorers in Liga Nacional de Honduras: 1

1996
