= Black Lions F.C. =

- Founded: 2024
- League: Botswana Premier League
- 2025–26: 14th

Black Lions is a football club based in Gaborone, Botswana. The team plays in the Botswana Premier League

== History ==
The club was founded in 2024, and registered in 2025 to play in Division Two. However, they purchased the Premier League status from VTM FC and are playing in the 2025–26 Botswana Premier League. The former coach of South African giants Orlando Pirates, Owen da Gama, coached them at the start of their first season in the top tier until his departure in December 2025.

They began with three consecutive defeats before finding some form and moving up the table.

In September 2025, the club donated P10,000 worth of equipment to Boitekanelo College.
