= Clarion (band) =

American rock band

- Origin: Los Angeles, California
- Genres: Shoegaze; indie rock
- Years active: 2023–present
- Label: Broke Records
- Members: Saya Oliva; Anthony Sanchez; Joseph Quezada
- Website: www.helloclarion.com

Clarion is an American rock band from Los Angeles, California. It was founded in 2023 by Saya Oliva (vocals, bass), Anthony Sanchez (guitar), and Joseph Quezada (drums). The band released their breakout single "Hello Juliet", which went viral on TikTok in 2024 and preceded their self-titled EP. In 2026, Clarion released their second EP, Blue Fairy. The band is known for having anime and manga as common themes in their music.

== History ==
Clarion was formed in late 2023, by Saya Oliva, Anthony Sanchez, and Joseph Quezada. The trio had all been previously involved in bands in the East Los Angeles local music scene and wanted to record the songs they had been writing. Sanchez was inspired to begin creating music by the Descendents' Milo Goes to College. A three-day recording sprint turned into Clarion's debut self-titled EP, which was released on July 2, 2024. Their debut single off the EP, "Hello Juliet" went viral through TikTok edits, most notably an anime compilation and corecore video, and led to them signing with Broke Records in 2025. The song was originally written after Sanchez's close friend died.

Clarion released their second EP, Blue Fairy, on March 27, 2026. Due to Quezada injuring himself, Javier Flores joined the band as a drummer during their tour in support of the EP and as an opening act for Panchiko.

== Influences and artistry ==
Clarion's music has been described as a mix of shoegaze, post-punk, grunge, and Japanese rock, with noisy guitars and '90s-inspired vocals. They use a technique of layering multiple amps in stereo and panning them in order to create an illusion of two guitarists. The band has named Sonic Youth, Dinosaur Jr., Hum, Julie, Fennel, The Pillows, Supercar, Number Girl, Tricot, Asian Kung-Fu Generation, Paramore, and Black Flag as inspirations for their EP Blue Fairy. Anime and manga are also common themes in the band's music; the song "Taxidermy" is inspired by Chobits, "Inertia" is about Goodnight Punpun, and "American Girl" is about Nisekoi. Singer and bass player Saya Oliva was named after the main character from Blood: The Last Vampire.

== Discography ==
=== Extended plays ===
| Title | Details |
|---|---|
| Clarion | Released: July 2, 2024; Label: Broke Records; Formats: Digital download |
| Blue Fairy | Released: March 27, 2026; Label: Broke Records; Formats: LP, CD, digital download |

=== Singles ===
| Title | Year | Album |
|---|---|---|
| "Hello Juliet" | 2024 | Clarion |
| "American Girl" | 2025 | Non-album single |
| "Media Mediocracy" | 2025 | Blue Fairy |
| "Blue Fairy" | 2026 | Blue Fairy |
| "Jilt" | 2026 | Non-album single |
