= Fernando Ferreira (footballer) =

Portuguese footballer (born 1986)

Personal information
- Full name: Fernando José Almeida Sequeira Ferreira
- Date of birth: 20 November 1986 (age 39)
- Place of birth: Viseu, Portugal
- Height: 1.83 m (6 ft 0 in)
- Position: Defensive midfielder

Youth career
- 1995–2001: Académico Viseu
- 2001–2005: Sporting CP

Senior career*
Years	Team	Apps	(Gls)
2005–2006	Casa Pia	13	(0)
2006	Espinho	3	(0)
2006–2008	Real Massamá	26	(0)
2008–2010	Académico Viseu	42	(5)
2010–2011	Tondela	22	(1)
2011–2014	Belenenses	86	(11)
2014–2016	Marítimo	22	(0)
2016–2017	Tondela	22	(0)
2017–2022	Académico Viseu	127	(11)
Total		363	(28)

International career
2004	Portugal U18	5	(0)
2004–2005	Portugal U19	4	(0)
- * Club domestic league appearances and goals

Fernando José Almeida Sequeira Ferreira (born 20 November 1986 in Viseu) is a Portuguese former professional footballer who played as a defensive midfielder.
