= Jorge Pineda =

Honduran footballer (born 1964)

Personal information
- Full name: Jorge Ernesto Pineda
- Date of birth: 26 November 1964 (age 61)
- Place of birth: Langue, Honduras
- Position: Midfielder

Team information
- Current team: Vida (manager)

Senior career*
Years	Team	Apps	(Gls)
1988–1996	Vida	163	(35)
1996–1998	Victoria	54	(3)
1998–1999	Real Maya	17	(1)
1999	Broncos	31	(7)
2000–2002	Victoria	68	(17)
2002–2003	Real España	28	(3)
2003	Victoria	14	(2)

International career
1995–2001	Honduras	8	(1)

Managerial career
- 2005–2006: Victoria
- 2007: Marathón
- 2008: Motagua
- 2009: Suchitepéquez
- 2010: Hispano
- 2011–2012: Necaxa
- 2013–: Vida
- * Club domestic league appearances and goals

Jorge Ernesto Pineda (born 26 November 1964) is a retired Honduran football player and current football manager. He is currently married to Ena Pineda and has four daughters named Darcy, Georgina, Chelsea and another daughter from a previous relationship named Andrea.

== Club career ==
Born in Valle Department in south Honduras, Pineda left for La Ceiba in the north to study and was snapped up by Vida. He played 8 years for Vida and later for Victoria, Real Maya, Broncos and Real España.

He scored 68 Honduran national league goals in total.

== International career ==
A relatively late newcomer, Pineda made his debut for Honduras in a November 1995 UNCAF Nations Cup match against Panama and has earned a total of 8 caps, scoring 1 goal. He has represented his country in 2 FIFA World Cup qualification matches and played at the 1995 UNCAF Nations Cup, as well as at the 1996 CONCACAF Gold Cup.

His final international was a July 2001 FIFA World Cup qualification match against Costa Rica.

=== International goals ===
Scores and results list Honduras' goal tally first.

N.	Date	Venue	Opponent	Score	Result	Competition
1.	29 November 1995	Estadio Óscar Quiteño, Santa Ana, El Salvador	Panama	1–0	2-0	1995 UNCAF Nations Cup

== Managerial career ==
After he finished his playing career, Pineda became assistant coach at Victoria and later became in charge himself. He has also managed Marathón, F.C. Motagua and moved abroad to lead Guatemalan side Suchitepéquez in the 2009 Clausura. In summer 2009 he was appointed manager of Hispano, returned to Victoria in summer 2010 and he was made coach of Necaxa ahead of the 2011 Apertura. In December 2012 he replaced Carlos Martínez as coach of Vida.

== Honours and awards ==
=== Country ===
Honduras

- Copa Centroamericana (1): 1995
