= 1992 Honduran Cup =

Tournament details
- Country: Honduras
- Teams: 10

Final positions
- Champions: Real España (2nd)
- Runner-up: Victoria
- CONCACAF Cup Winners Cup: Real España

The 1992 Honduran Cup was the third edition of the Honduran Cup and the first one since 1972. Real C.D. España won its 2nd title after beating C.D. Victoria in the final. With the win, Real España qualified to the 1993 CONCACAF Cup Winners Cup.

== Group stage ==
Played in 3 groups in a home and away system qualifying the top 3 and the best runner-up.

=== Group A ===
Pos	Team	Pld	W	D	L	GF	GA	GD	Pts	Qualification
1	Real España	4	2	2	0	7	2	+5	6	Re-match
2	Platense	4	2	2	0	5	2	+3	6	Re-match
3	Marathón	4	0	0	4	0	8	−8	0	

Updated to match(es) played on 1992. Source:
- Real España and Platense forced to a re-match to decide the group's winners.

18 July 1992 Re-match	Real España	1–2	Platense	San Pedro Sula
	Hernández		Figueroa	Stadium: Estadio General Francisco Morazán

=== Group B ===
Pos	Team	Pld	W	D	L	GF	GA	GD	Pts	Qualification
1	Olimpia	6	3	2	1	13	5	+8	8	Re-match
2	Motagua	6	2	4	0	11	6	+5	8	Re-match
3	Real Maya	6	2	3	1	6	6	0	7	
4	Súper Estrella	6	0	1	5	5	18	−13	1	

Updated to match(es) played on 1992. Source:
- Olimpia and Motagua forced to a re-match to decide the group's winners.

18 July 1992 Re-match	Olimpia	5–0	Motagua	Tegucigalpa
	Williams; Costa; Pineda; Espinoza; Cruz			Stadium: Estadio Tiburcio Carías Andino

=== Group C ===
Pos	Team	Pld	W	D	L	GF	GA	GD	Pts	Qualification
1	Victoria	4	2	1	1	4	3	+1	5	Re-match
2	Petrotela	4	2	1	1	3	3	0	5	Re-match
3	Vida	4	1	0	3	4	5	−1	2	

Updated to match(es) played on 1992. Source:
- Victoria and Petrotela forced to a re-match to decide the group's winners.

18 July 1992 Re-match	Petrotela	0–4	Victoria	San Pedro Sula
			Flores; Reneau; Gruesso	Stadium: Estadio General Francisco Morazán

=== Best losers ===
The fourth semifinal spot was selected from the three re-match games, the team with the least worst record.

Pos	Team	Pld	W	D	L	GF	GA	GD	Pts	Qualification
1	Real España	1	0	0	1	1	2	−1	0	Semifinals (as lucky losers)
2	Petrotela	1	0	0	1	0	4	−4	0	
3	Motagua	1	0	0	1	0	5	−5	0	

Updated to match(es) played on 18 July 1992. Source:

== Semifinals ==
25 July 1992 1st leg	Platense	0–0	Victoria	San Pedro Sula, Cortés
				Stadium: Estadio Francisco Morazán

2 August 1992 2nd leg	Victoria	1–0	Platense	La Ceiba, Atlántida
	Brown			Stadium: Estadio Nilmo Edwards

- Victoria won 1–0 on aggregated.

5 August 1992 1st leg	Real España	1–0	Olimpia	San Pedro Sula, Cortés
	Anariba			Stadium: Estadio Francisco Morazán

9 August 1992 2nd leg	Olimpia	1–0	Real España	Tegucigalpa, Francisco Morazán
	Williams			Stadium: Estadio Tiburcio Carías Andino

- Real España 1–1 Olimpia on aggregated. Real España won on penalty shoot-outs.

== Final ==
16 August 1992 1st leg	Real España	2–0	Victoria	San Pedro Sula, Cortés
	Vallejo; Castro			Stadium: Estadio Francisco Morazán

23 August 1992 2nd leg	Victoria	2–2	Real España	La Ceiba, Atlántida
	Brown; Gruesso		Hernández; Vallejo	Stadium: Estadio Nilmo Edwards

- Real España won 4–2 on aggregated.

== Known results ==
=== Group A ===
30 May 1992

Real España	2–2	Platense

San Pedro Sula
26 June 1992

Real España	3–0	Marathón
Pavón

San Pedro Sula
4 July 1992

Real España	1–1	Platense
Pavón

15 July 1992

Marathón	0–2	Real España
		Pavón

San Pedro Sula

=== Group B ===
18 June 1992

Motagua	3–0	Olimpia
Ávila; Rodríguez

Tegucigalpa
