= Erick Fú =

Honduran footballer (born 1964)

Personal information
- Full name: Erick Dario Fú Lanza
- Date of birth: 17 June 1964 (age 62)
- Place of birth: Tegucigalpa, Honduras
- Position: Midfielder

Senior career*
Years	Team	Apps	(Gls)
1987–1993	Olimpia	65	(1)
1993–1997	Victoria		

International career
–1996	Honduras	24	(0)
- * Club domestic league appearances and goals

Erick Dario Fú Lanza (born 17 June 1964) is a retired Honduran football player who played for the national team in the 1980s and 1990s.

== Club career ==
Fú played 65 matches in six years for Honduran giants Olimpia and also played for Victoria. He was sent off in the 1988 championship final.

== International career ==
Fú made his debut for Honduras in the 1980s and has earned a total of 24 caps, scoring no goals. He has represented his country in 2 FIFA World Cup qualification matches and played at the 1993 CONCACAF Gold Cup.

His final international was an October 1996 friendly match against El Salvador.

== Retirement ==
After retiring as a player, Fú has been sports reporter at television programme "Sport 504".
