= Real C.D. España =

Association football club in Honduras

Real España
- Full name: Real Club Deportivo España
- Nicknames: Los Aurinegros (The Gold and Blacks); La Máquina (The Machine); Los Catedráticos (The Professors); La Realeza (The Royalty); Los Carboneros (The Coalmen); La Academia (The Academy)
- Founded: 14 July 1929; 97 years ago
- Ground: Estadio General Francisco Morazán, San Pedro Sula, Honduras
- Capacity: 20,000
- President: Elias Burbara
- Manager: Jeaustin Campos
- League: Liga Nacional
- Apertura 2021: 1st (Runners-up)
- Website: realcdespana.com
Home colours	Away colours

Real Club Deportivo España, Real España, nicknamed Los Aurinegros or simply España, is a Honduran professional football club, which plays in the Liga Nacional de Fútbol de Honduras. With 12 championships, Real España is one of the most accomplished Honduran football clubs. Their title of 'Real' (Spanish for 'Royal') was awarded by King Juan Carlos I of Spain in 1977.

They are based in San Pedro Sula, Cortés, and their home venue is the Estadio General Francisco Morazán.

== History ==
Real España was founded on 14 July 1929 at Escuela Ramón Rosa, de San Pedro Sula by Pastor Reyes, Erick Mejía Handal, Juan Banegas, "Teco" Lardizábal, Hugo Escoto Soto, and Leonardo Muñoz as Club Deportivo España.

Their professional history begins in 1965–66, with the founding of the Honduran national league. For most of the league's first decade, Los Aurinegros were a mid-table side. However, in the early 1970s, things began to change. The team was anchored by defender Jaime Villegas, who would play for Real España from 1970 to 1986, and make a club record 306 appearances. In 1974, the addition of two new faces, goalkeeper Julio César Arzú and striker Jimmy James Bailey, turned the team into title contenders for the first time. The team finished third in the regular season's table, which was good enough to qualify them for a quadrangular tournament, a round robin with the league's top four teams. Real España won this phase, forcing a championship playoff with regular season champions Motagua. Antonio Pavón Molina scored the lone goal of their 1–0 victory, making Los Aurinegros champions of Honduras for the very first time.

In 1975, la Máquina got even stronger. They added a defensive midfielder named Gilberto Yearwood, who would eventually be considered one of the greatest Honduran players of all time. On the pitch, they enjoyed similar results, finishing third in the regular table, winning the quadrangular playoff, and earning a championship playoff with Olimpia. The teams drew the first leg 0–0, but Real España won the second leg 2–0, with goals from Alberto Ferreira da Silva and Yearwood.

1976 saw the club achieved greater success. They won the regular season championship with 38 points (15 wins in 27 matches) and only narrowly finished second to Motagua in the quadrangular (had they won, there would have been no need for a championship playoff). In the resulting playoff, the teams drew 0–0 in the first leg, played at Motagua's stadium in Tegucigalpa. Back in San Pedro Sula, the story was different. Real España dominated, winning the match 4–1 and clinching their third straight championship. It was known as "el tricampeon", and it was the first such accomplishment in the history of Honduran soccer (it would not be equalled until Olimpia managed it in the late 1990s).

After this, international attention was descending on the club for the first time. Yearwood, who had starred in the 1977 FIFA World Youth Championship for Honduras, moved abroad and would spend ten years playing in Spain's La Liga. King Juan Carlos I of Spain bestowed the Real title on the club the following summer. Things were looking up.

In 1977, the club set out in search of an unprecedented fourth consecutive title. They finished third in the regular season and won the quadrangular, only to bow 2–0 to Olimpia in the championship playoff. They reached the championship round again in 1978–79, but were once again defeated, this time by Motagua. Then, in 1979, disaster. Real España's form collapsed and they plummeted to 8th in the league. Worse, crosstown rivals Marathón won the championship.

They set out to remedy this in 1980, winning the regular season championship with 14 wins in 27 matches. In the pentagonal round robin, though, things became complex—Olimpia, Marathón, and Real España were all tied at the top of the table, forcing a second round-robin among those three. Real España had the chance to win the championship then and there, but after every match ended in a draw, the pentagonal title was awarded to Marathón on goal difference. That set up an all-San Pedro Sula championship match.

The teams split the first two legs, forcing a decisive third playoff match. With all of San Pedro Sula watching in anticipation, Real brought home their fourth title by a 2–1 scoreline. This was the end of Real's golden era. Their glory side was beginning to age, and Olimpia was ascending to the dominant heights of Honduran football. It was not until the late 1980s that a revival would begin.

After near misses in 1986 and 1987, Real reclaimed their glory in 1988 by winning the regular season championship and then beating Olimpia in an extra time playoff final to claim their fifth title. 1989–90 saw the two teams meet again in the championship final, which ended level; Olimpia was awarded the crown on the basis of a superior regular season record. Real, however, was not finished—they came right back by beating Motagua 2–1 to win the 1990–91 championship. Rodolfo Richardson Smith was the hero, scoring a double in the second leg of the finals. La máquina only narrowly missed a second consecutive crown when they bowed to Motagua in the 1991–92 title match.

Two years later, in 1993–94, Real España hoisted their seventh championship in the most dominant style of all, by winning both the regular season and triangular playoff. No championship match was necessary in this most impressive season; out of 31 domestic matches, la maquina had lost just once. The leader of the charge that season was Carlos Pavón, an 18-year-old striker who was attracting all sorts of international attention. Pavón would leave after the season to spend a decade abroad, playing in Mexico and Italy. Real, meanwhile, entered a decade long title drought.

Their return to glory came in Apertura 2003, under the managerial leadership of Juan de Dios Castillo. Castillo had built his team around two Brazilian strikers, Pedrinho and Luciano Emilio, and it was successful. Luciano Emilio won the league scoring title, and each scored in the championship final, which saw Real España defeat Olimpia 4–2 on aggregate.

However, the glory was fleeting. Diaz Castillo left for Marathon, while Olimpia signed Luciano Emilio and used his talents to win four out of the next five titles. Those were frustrating times, as Real missed the championship playoffs four tournaments in a row. It was not until Clausura 2007 that the club returned to form.

Under Mexican manager José Treviño, the club won the regular season title and advanced to the playoffs. Treviño had a strong team--Carlos Pavón had returned from Europe, and was joined at striker by Milton Núñez and the Brazilian Esvaldo Ferreira. A victory over Motagua earned them a berth in the finals against crosstown rivals Marathon. Marathon won the first leg, 2–1, which set up a dramatic championship showdown. With just thirteen minutes left in the last leg, the teams were level, 1–1, which would have given Marathon a win on aggregate. However, Milton Núñez scored a brilliant goal to even the tie, then used his perfect aerial pass to set up Ferreira for the winning goal. Real España were champions of Honduras for the ninth time.

The club finished runners up in both Apertura 2008 and Clausura 2009, but returned to the top in dramatic style in Apertura 2010. A double from attacking midfielder Luis Lobo lifted the club to a semi-final win over Marathon, and in the finals they defeated Olimpia in extra time. They won it again in Apertura 2013, beating Real Sociedad on penalties, and then again in Apertura 2017, holding off Motagua in extra time.

== Colours and badge ==
España's colours are black and yellow, which are reflected in the club's nickname: Aurinegros (a compound word meaning gold and black). The club logo was changed in 2006 to give a younger, more fresh look. The club mascot has changed many times; it has been a yellow and black owl, a train, and most recently a robot. The crown symbolizes the "royal status" granted to the club by the King of Spain. This is noticeable in other clubs such as Real Madrid, Real Sociedad, Real Betis, Real Murcia, Real Valladolid, and Real Zaragoza.

Kelme is the team's official sportswear manufacturer.

== Stadium ==
Real España plays their home matches at the Estadio Francisco Morazán. It has been Real España's home stadium since its creation. In 2008, Real España played all their home games at the Estadio Olímpico due to the Estadio Morazán's renewal.

== Club rivalries ==
=== Clásico Moderno (Honduras) ===
El Clásico Moderno (The Modern Derby) also referred by some as the Clasico Moderno Hondureño is a Honduran football match played at least four times a year in the Liga Nacional de Honduras and consists of two teams, C.D. Olimpia and Real C.D. España.

=== Clásico Sampedrano ===
El Clásico Sampedrano (The Sampedran Derby) is a Honduran football match played at least four times a year in the Liga Nacional de Fútbol de Honduras and consists of two teams, Marathón and Real España. These two teams are from San Pedro Sula, hence the name. Marathon has run away numerous times. Including from a 6-1 defeat at Estadio Yankel Mierdero.

=== Motagua–Real España football rivalry ===
The Motagua–Real España classic is not as fierce as the other two already mentioned as these both teams have a good relationship with each other from the players, to the board and the fans; however they had played six intense league finals, three won by each side.

== Achievements ==
Domestic

- Liga Nacional de Fútbol de Honduras:

Winners (12): 1974, 1975, 1976, 1980, 1988, 1990, 1993, Apertura 2003, Clausura 2007, Apertura 2010, Apertura 2013, Apertura 2017
Runners-up (14): 1977–78, 1978–79, 1986–87, 1989–90, 1991–92, 1995–96, 1997–98 A, 1998–99, 2008–09 A, 2008–09 C, 2011–12 A, 2021–22 A, 2021–22 C, 2024–25 C

- Honduran Cup:

Winners (2): 1972, 1992

International

- Copa Fraternidad / Grandes de C.A. / UNCAF Interclub Cup: 2

Champions (2): 1981, 1982
Runners-up (1): 1979
Third-place (2): 1998, 2000

- CONCACAF Cup Winners Cup:

Runners-up (1): 1993.

- Copa Premier Centroamericana:

Champions (1): 2019.

=== Individual club achievements ===
- First "Tri-Campeón" (three time consecutive winner) (1974), (1975), (1976)
- Five Consecutive Honduran finals (1974), (1975), (1976), (1977), (1978)

== Player records ==
Most goals scored (as of 2010 Clausura)
#	Player	Career	Goals	Apps
1	Carlos Pavón	1992–1994, 2003, 2006–2009, 2011–2013	81	148
2	Jimmy James Bailey	1973–1985	52	191
3	Carlos "Chico" Handal		51	
4	Luciano Emilio	2002–2004	45	68
5	Júnior Costly	1978–1989	41	38

Most appearances (as of January 21, 2009)
#	Player	Career	Apps	Goals
1	Jaime Villegas	1970–1986	309	2
2	Mauricio "Guicho" Fúnez	1983–1997	296	6
3	Edy Contreras		285	
4	Antonio Pavón Molina		232	12
5	Milton "El Chocolate" Flores	1992–2002	231	0
6	Edelmín "Pando" Castro	1970–1982	220	37
7	Anthony Costly	1977–1982, 1987–1991	209	
8	Carlos Orlando Caballero	1980–1991	203	30
9	Jimmy James Bailey	1973–1985	191	52
10	Camilo "Tin Tin" Bonilla	1989–2005	176	
11	Santos "Indio" Ruiz		170	

== League and Playoffs Performance ==
(1994–present)

Season	Position	GP	W	D	L	GF	GA	PTS	Play-offs
1993–94	1st	27	14	12	1	?	?	40	Champions
1994–95	3rd	27	10	9	8	27	23	39	Second round
1995–96	6th	27	9	9	9	32	33	36	Runners-up
1996–97	6th	27	8	10	9	24	24	34	Second round
1997–98 Apertura	5th	20	8	8	4	30	26	32	Semi-finals
1997–98 Clausura	8th	20	5	8	7	24	26	23	did not qualify
1999 Apertura	4th	18	5	11	2	24	18	26	Runners-up
1999–00 Apertura	9th	18	4	5	9	13	21	17	did not qualify
1999–00 Clausura	8th	18	3	7	8	14	22	16	did not qualify
2000–01 Apertura	4th	18	6	6	6	21	24	24	Semi-finals
2000–01 Clausura	4th	18	6	4	8	27	29	22	Semi-finals
2001–02 Apertura	5th	18	5	9	4	21	15	24	did not qualify
2001–02 Clausura	5th	18	5	8	5	16	15	23	did not qualify
2002–03 Apertura	4th	18	6	8	4	25	18	26	Semi-finals
2002–03 Clausura	3rd	18	9	6	3	25	15	33	Semi-finals
2003–04 Apertura	2nd	18	10	5	3	36	23	35	Champions
2003–04 Clausura	4th	16	7	3	6	28	25	24	Semi-finals
2004–05 Apertura	3rd	18	9	4	5	23	12	31	Semi-finals
2004–05 Clausura	4th	17	5	7	5	19	18	22	Semi-finals
2005–06 Apertura	6th	18	6	5	7	23	23	23	did not qualify.
2005–06 Clausura	6th	18	5	8	5	15	17	23	did not qualify.
2006–07 Apertura	7th	18	5	6	7	18	20	21	did not qualify.
2006–07 Clausura	1st	18	11	4	3	27	10	36	Champions
2007–08 Apertura	6th	18	6	4	8	22	25	22	did not qualify
2007–08 Clausura	3rd	18	8	4	6	26	22	28	Semi-finals
2008–09 Apertura	1st	18	11	5	2	35	17	38	Runners-up
2008–09 Clausura	3rd	18	8	6	4	20	12	30	Runners-up
2009–10 Apertura	4th	18	9	3	6	26	20	30	Semi-finals
2010–11 Apertura	3rd	18	7	7	4	28	18	28	Champions
2010–11 Clausura	5th	18	6	7	5	25	25	25	did not qualify
2011–12 Apertura	1st	18	9	7	2	25	13	34	Runners-up
2011–12 Clausura	5th	18	7	4	7	28	26	25	Semi-finals
2012–13 Apertura	6th	18	5	6	7	21	22	21	Quarter-finals
2012–13 Clausura	8th	18	5	7	6	18	22	22	did not qualify

=== All-Time Table ===
- As of 13 September 2008

#	G	W	D	L	F	A	+/-
3	1409	539	489	381	1713	1352	+361

=== 36 Game Average ===
Points	Won	Drawn	Lost	For	Against	Difference
53	13	13	10	43	34	+9

== International competition ==
=== CONCACAF Champions' Cup ===
- 1975 CONCACAF Champions' Cup

First Round v. (Costa Rica) Deportivo Saprissa – 1:4, 2:0 (Saprissa advance 4:3 on aggregate)

- 1976 CONCACAF Champions' Cup

First Round v. (Honduras) CD Olimpia – 0:0, 0:1 (Olimpia advance 1:0 on aggregate)

- 1977 CONCACAF Champions' Cup

Third Round v. (Costa Rica) Deportivo Saprissa – (Real España withdrew)

- 1981 CONCACAF Champions' Cup

First Round v. (Mexico) Cruz Azul – 2:1, 0:3 (Cruz Azul advance 4:2 on aggregate)

- 1987 CONCACAF Champions' Cup

First Round v. (Belize) Real Verdes – 2:0, 6:1 (Real España advance 8:1 on aggregate)
Second Round v. (Guatemala) Aurora F.C. – 1:0
Second Round v. (El Salvador) Alianza FC – 2:1
Second Round v. (Costa Rica) Deportivo Saprissa – 1:3
Third Round v. (Costa Rica) CS Herediano – 2:3
Third Round v. (Honduras) CD Olimpia – 0:1
Third Round v. (Costa Rica) Deportivo Saprissa – 1:2

- 1989 CONCACAF Champions' Cup

First Round v. (Guatemala) Aurora F.C. – 1:1
First Round v. (Costa Rica) CS Cartaginés – 1:0
First Round v. (El Salvador) Firpo – 0:0
Second Round v. (Costa Rica) CS Herediano – 1:3
Second Round v. (Honduras) CD Olimpia – 0:3
Second Round v. (Costa Rica) CS Cartaginés – 2:0

- 1990 CONCACAF Champions' Cup

First Round v. (Nicaragua) Diriangén FC – 5:1, 2:0 (Real España advance 7:1 on aggregate)
Second Round v. (Guatemala) CSD Municipal – 2:1, 1:0 (Real España advance 3:1 on aggregate)
Third Round v. (El Salvador) Firpo – 0:3
Third Round v. (El Salvador) Firpo – 1:1
Third Round v. (Honduras) CD Olimpia – 4:1
Third Round v. (Honduras) CD Olimpia – 0:1

- 1991 CONCACAF Champions' Cup

First Round v. (Belize) Acros Real Verdes – 5:0, 1:0 (Real España advance 6:0 on aggregate)
Second Round v. (El Salvador) Alianza FC – 1:0, 1:1 (Real España advance 2:1 on aggregate)
Third Round v. (Costa Rica) LD Alajuelense – 2:0, 1:0 (Real España advance 3:0 on aggregate)
Final Round v. (Costa Rica) Deportivo Saprissa – 2:1, 2:0 (Real España advance 4:1 on aggregate)
Semi-finals v. (Trinidad and Tobago) Police FC – 0:0, 0:1 (Police advance 1:0 on aggregate)

- 1992 CONCACAF Champions' Cup

First Round v. (El Salvador) Águila – 0:0, 3:1 (Real España advance 3:1 on aggregate)
Third Round v. (United States) San Francisco Bay Blackhawks – 0:3, 0:3 (San Francisco Bay Blackhawks advance 6:0 on aggregate)

- 1993 CONCACAF Champions' Cup

First Round v. (Belize) Acros Real Verdes – 2:1, 3:0 (Real España advance 5:1 on aggregate)
Second Round v. (Mexico) Club León – 0:0, 0:4 (León advance 4:0 on aggregate)

- 1995 CONCACAF Champions' Cup

First Round v. (Mexico) Santos Laguna – 1:1, 2:6 (Santos Laguna advance 7:3 on aggregate)

- 1997 CONCACAF Champions' Cup

First Round v. (Belize) Juventus – 1:0, 1:4 (Juventus advance 4:2 on aggregate)

- 2000 CONCACAF Champions' Cup

Quarter-Finals v. (United States) Los Angeles Galaxy – 0:0 (Los Angeles Galaxy advance 5:3 on penalties)

=== Copa Fraternidad ===
- 1979 Copa Fraternidad

Group 2 v. (Honduras) CD Broncos – 1:2
Group 2 v. (Guatemala) Cobán Imperial – 3:2
Group 2 v. (Guatemala) CSD Comunicaciones – 3:2
Group 2 v. (El Salvador) Atlético Marte – 5:3
Group 2 v. (El Salvador) FAS – 5:3
Group 2 v. (Honduras) CD Broncos – 1:0
Group 2 v. (Guatemala) Cobán Imperial – 2:1
Group 2 v. (Guatemala) CSD Comunicaciones – 1:1
Group 2 v. (El Salvador) Atlético Marte – 1:1
Group 2 v. (El Salvador) FAS – 1:0
Final v. (Guatemala) Aurora F.C. – 0:1, 0:0 (Aurora wins 1:0 on aggregate)

- 1981 Copa Fraternidad

First Round v. (El Salvador) Alianza FC – 1:0, 1:0 (Real España advance 2:0 on aggregate)
Second Round v. (Guatemala) CD Suchitepéquez – 1:0, 2:1 (Real España advance 3:1 on aggregate)

- 1982 Copa Fraternidad

First Round v. (Guatemala) CSD Comunicaciones – 1:2, 2:0 (Real España advance 3:2 on aggregate)
Second Round v. (El Salvador) FAS – 3:0, 0:1 (Real España advance 3:1 on aggregate)
Final v. (Guatemala) Xelajú MC – 2:1, 0:0 (Real España wins 2:1 on aggregate)

=== UNCAF Interclub Cup ===
- 2000 UNCAF Interclub Cup

First Round v. (Nicaragua) Real Estelí – 2:1
First Round v. (Costa Rica) LD Alajuelense – 0:1
First Round v. (Costa Rica) LD Alajuelense – 1:1
First Round v. (Nicaragua) Real Estelí – 8:0
Second Round v. (Panama) Árabe Unido – 2:1
Second Round v. (Guatemala) CSD Comunicaciones – 2:1
Second Round v. (Costa Rica) LD Alajuelense – 0:1
Final Round v. (Costa Rica) LD Alajuelense – 1:1
Final Round v. (Honduras) CD Olimpia – 0:2
Final Round v. (Guatemala) CSD Municipal – 3:2

- 2004 UNCAF Interclub Cup

First Round v. (Nicaragua) Real Estelí – 1:1, 3:3 (Real Estelí advance on away goals rule)

- 2007 UNCAF Interclub Cup

First Round v. (Belize) Revolutionary Conquerors – 2:1, 1:2 (Real España advance 4:2 on penalties)
Quarter-Finals v. (Costa Rica) LD Alajuelense – 0:0, 2:2 (Alajuelense advance 5:4 on penalties)

== Players ==
=== Current squad ===
As of 12 April, 2026.

Note: Flags indicate national team as defined under FIFA eligibility rules; some limited exceptions apply. Players may hold more than one non-FIFA nationality.

No.	Pos.	Nation	Player
4	DF	URU	Juan Capeluto
5	DF	HON	Franklin Flores
6	MF	HON	Devron García
7	MF	ARG	Gonzalo Ritacco
8	MF	HON	Anthony García
10	MF	HON	Jhow Benavídez (Captain)
11	FW	HON	Eddie Hernández
12	MF	HON	Nixon Cruz
14	MF	HON	Jack Jean-Baptiste
15	DF	HON	Dixon Ramírez
16	FW	HON	Exon Arzú (on loan from Houston Dynamo)
18	FW	HON	Darixon Vuelto
19	DF	PAN	Daniel Aparicio

No.	Pos.	Nation	Player
20	FW	HON	César Romero
21	DF	HON	Danilo Palacios
22	GK	HON	Luis López
23	GK	HON	Roberto López
26	DF	PAN	Julio Rodriguez (on loan from Plaza Amador)
28	DF	HON	Carlos Mejía
30	FW	ARG	David Sayago
34	MF	HON	Christopher Pike
36	MF	HON	Roberto Osorto
39	DF	HON	Daylor Cacho
44	DF	HON	Anfronit Tatum
49	GK	HON	Héctor Reyes
54	FW	HON	Mike Arana

=== Out on loan ===
Note: Flags indicate national team as defined under FIFA eligibility rules; some limited exceptions apply. Players may hold more than one non-FIFA nationality.

No.	Pos.	Nation	Player
—	DF	HON	Darlin Mencia (at (Uruguay) Montevideo Wanderers until 31 December 2026)
—	FW	HON	Moises Alvarado (at Choloma until 30 June 2026)
—	FW	HON	Marco Aceituno (at Choloma until 30 June 2026)

== Managers ==
- (Honduras) Moisés "Rana de Agua" Canales
- (Honduras) Ernesto Cover
- (Chile) Eduardo Piña Monsálves
- (Argentina) Roberto Scalessie
- (Chile) Jorge Chajtur
- (Colombia) Carlos Viera
- (Honduras) Chelato Uclés (1971–75)
- (Honduras) Carlos Padilla (1975–79)
- (Chile) Néstor Matamala (1980–82)
- (Costa Rica) Marvin Rodríguez (1982–84)
- (Honduras) Enrique Grey Fúnez (1985–86)
- (Honduras) Ángel Ramón Rodríguez (1986–87)
- (Peru) Pedro Delgado Zárate (1987–88)
- (Brazil) Flavio Ortega (1988)
- (Honduras) Mario Ramón Sandoval (1989)
- (Brazil) Flavio Ortega (1990)
- (El Salvador) Oscar Benítez (1991–92)
- (Chile) Néstor Matamala (1992–93)
- (Uruguay) Ernesto Luzardo (1993)
- (Brazil) Luis Pablo Paz Camargo (1994)
- (Uruguay) Héctor Hugo Eugui (1995–97)
- (Argentina) Alberto Romero (1997)
- (Brazil) Flavio Ortega (1997–98)
- (Honduras) Gilberto Yearwood (1998–99)
- (Honduras) Hernán García (1999)
- (Uruguay) Daniel Alonzo (2000)
- (Uruguay) Ariel Longo (2000–01)
- (Honduras) Rubén Guifarro (2001)
- (Honduras) Leonel Machado (2002)
- (Honduras) Edwin Pavón (2002)
- (Mexico) Juan de Dios Castillo (2003–05)
- (Mexico) Alberto Ordaz (2005)
- (Uruguay) Ricardo "Tato" Ortíz (2005–06)
- (Honduras) Carlos Orlando Caballero (2006)
- (Mexico) José Treviño (2007)
- (Mexico) Magdaleno Cano (2007)
- (Uruguay) Daniel Uberti (2007)
- (Argentina) Mario Zanabria (2008)
- (Honduras) Ramón Maradiaga (2008–2009)
- (Argentina) Mario Zanabria (2010–12)
- (Honduras) Chelato Uclés (2012)
- (Honduras) Nahúm Espinoza (2012)
- (Mexico) José Treviño (2013)
- (Costa Rica) Hernán Medford (2013–14)
- (Costa Rica) Javier Delgado Prado (2014–2015)
- (Costa Rica) Hernán Medford (2015)
- (Argentina) Mario Zanabria (2015)
- (Uruguay) Miguel Falero (2016)
- (Honduras) Mauro Reyes (2016–17)
- (Honduras) Ramon Maradiaga (2017)
- (Uruguay) Martin Garcia (2017–2018)
- (Colombia) Carlos Restrepo (2019)
- (Costa Rica) Hernán Medford (2019)
- (Honduras) Luis Ordóñez (2019)
- (Uruguay) Ramiro Martínez (2019–2020)
- (Honduras) Emilson Soto (2020)
- (Mexico) Raul Gutierrez (2021–2022)
- (Honduras) Emilson Soto (2022)
- (Argentina) Hector Vargas (2022)
- (Uruguay) Julio Rodríguez (2023)
- (Uruguay) Miguel Falero (2024)
- (Costa Rica) Jeaustin Campos (2024–present)
