= Álex Ávila =

Honduran footballer (born 1964)

Alex Ávila
Personal information
- Full name: Alex Geovany Ávila Pineda
- Date of birth: 26 December 1964 (age 61)
- Place of birth: La Lima, Honduras
- Position: Striker

Senior career*
Years	Team	Apps	(Gls)
1984–1991	Real España		(34)
1991–1995	Motagua		(30)
1992	Cruz Azul	0	(0)
1992–1993	Pachuca	13	(4)
1995–1996	Independiente		(4)
1996–1997	Platense		(4)

International career
1988–1995	Honduras	6	(0)
- * Club domestic league appearances and goals

Alex Geovany Ávila Pineda (born 26 December 1964) is a retired Honduran football player who is known for playing with Honduran clubs Real España and Motagua.

== Club career ==
Ávila started his career at Real España and scored 72 Honduran league goals for 4 clubs over 13 years. On 5 March 1992 he scored the only goal for Motagua against his former club to win the championship final. He also had a spell in Mexico.

He was Honduran league top goalscorer with Motagua in 1994–95, scoring 13 goals in 13 matches.

== International career ==
Ávila made his debut for Honduras in an April 1988 friendly match against Mexico and has earned a total of 6 caps, scoring no goals. He has represented his country at the 1991 CONCACAF Gold Cup.

His final international was a June 1995 friendly match against Turkey.

== Retirement ==
In 2011, he was coaching juniors in Charlotte, USA.
