= Copa Centroamericana =

Copa Centroamericana/Copa de Naciones UNCAF
- Official logo of the competition as Copa Centroamericana (2011–2017)
- Organiser(s): UNCAF
- Founded: 1991; 35 years ago, as Copa de Naciones UNCAF
- Abolished: 2017; 9 years ago
- Region: Central America
- Teams: 7
- Related competitions: North American Nations Cup; Caribbean Cup/CFU Championship
- Last champions: Honduras (4th title)
- Most championships: Costa Rica (8 titles)

The Copa Centroamericana (English: Central American Cup) was an association football competition organized by UNCAF as its top regional tournament for men's senior national teams from Central America. The tournament was held from 1991 to 2017, every two years in the years before and after the FIFA World Cup and also served as a qualification method for the CONCACAF Gold Cup. It was originally known as Copa de Naciones UNCAF (English: UNCAF Nations Cup) from 1991 to 2009, changing to the latter name in the 2011 edition.

The tournament consisted of two stages, in the group stage of the tournament finals, the seven teams competed in two groups with a round-robin format, one group with four teams and the other with three teams, with the top two teams in each group qualified for the semifinal, where the winners advanced into the final while the losers disputed a third place match. The fifth place match was disputed between the third-ranked teams of the group stage. Depending on their performance in the Copa Centroamericana, teams then went on to participate in other competitions, such as the CONCACAF Gold Cup and the Copa América.

The 14 editions of the Central American competition were won by four different national teams: Costa Rica were the most successful national team with 8 titles. Honduras won 4 titles, Guatemala and Panama won one title each. Costa Rica and Honduras were the only sides in history to win consecutive titles, with the former winning an unprecedented three titles in 2003, 2005 and 2007.

The last edition was held in 2017, with its place in the fixture schedule being taken by the CONCACAF Nations League.

== History ==
Due to the success of the Costa Rica national football team at the 1990 FIFA World Cup and the approaching 1994 FIFA World Cup to be hosted in the United States, the CONCACAF Congress in Kingston, Jamaica decided to stage a continental championship itself; the CONCACAF Gold Cup was ratified on August 18, 1990. Costa Rica were given a bye into the competition due to its title at the 1989 CONCACAF Championship, which also served as a qualification phase for the World Cup hosted by Italy. However, due to mainly economic reasons, the United States were chosen as the venue for the continental tournament.

During that same conference, the qualification format for the Central American associations were also decided on. The final qualification round of the Central American zone had two bids: the United States and Costa Rica. Costa Rica, now three-time CONCACAF champions and to celebrate their anniversary of the nation's World Cup performance by its team, was named by CONCACAF and UNCAF as the host country of the inaugural edition of the regional tournament organized by UNCAF (1991 UNCAF Nations Cup) on February 19, 1991.

== Participating teams ==
The 7 UNCAF members participated on the tournament:

- Belize
- Costa Rica
- El Salvador
- Guatemala
- Honduras
- Nicaragua
- Panama

== Results ==
| # | Year | Hosts | Final | | | Third place game | | | Teams |
| # | Year | Hosts | Champions | Results | Runners-up | Third place | Results | Fourth place | Teams |
|---|---|---|---|---|---|---|---|---|---|
Copa de Naciones UNCAF
| 1 | 1991 | Costa Rica | Costa Rica | Round-Robin | Honduras | Guatemala | Round-Robin | El Salvador | 4 |
| 2 | 1993 | Honduras | Honduras | Round-Robin | Costa Rica | Panama | Round-Robin | El Salvador | 5 |
| 3 | 1995 | El Salvador | Honduras | 3–0 | Guatemala | El Salvador | 2–1 | Costa Rica | 7 |
| 4 | 1997 | Guatemala | Costa Rica | Round-Robin | Guatemala | El Salvador | Round-Robin | Honduras | 7 |
| 5 | 1999 | Costa Rica | Costa Rica | Round-Robin | Guatemala | Honduras | Round-Robin | El Salvador | 6 |
| 6 | 2001 | Honduras | Guatemala | Round-Robin | Costa Rica | El Salvador | Round-Robin | Panama | 7 |
| 7 | 2003 | Panama | Costa Rica | Round-Robin | Guatemala | El Salvador | Round-Robin | Honduras | 6 |
| 8 | 2005 | Guatemala | Costa Rica | 1–1 (7–6 p) | Honduras | Guatemala | 3–0 | Panama | 7 |
| 9 | 2007 | El Salvador | Costa Rica | 1–1 (4–1 p) | Panama | Guatemala | 1–0 | El Salvador | 7 |
| 10 | 2009 | Honduras | Panama | 0–0 (5–3 p) | Costa Rica | Honduras | 1–0 | El Salvador | 7 |
Copa Centroamericana
| 11 | 2011 | Panama | Honduras | 2–1 | Costa Rica | Panama | 0–0 (5–4 p) | El Salvador | 7 |
| 12 | 2013 | Costa Rica | Costa Rica | 1–0 | Honduras | El Salvador | 1–0 | Belize | 7 |
| 13 | 2014 | United States | Costa Rica | 2–1 | Guatemala | Panama | 1–0 | El Salvador | 7 |
| 14 | 2017 | Panama | Honduras | Round-Robin | Panama | El Salvador | Round-Robin | Costa Rica | 6 |

== Performances ==
=== Top 4 ===
| Team | Champions | Runners-up | Third place | Fourth place | Total |
|---|---|---|---|---|---|
| Costa Rica | 8 (1991, 1997, 1999, 2003, 2005, 2007, 2013, 2014) | 4 (1993, 2001, 2009, 2011) | – | 2 (1995, 2017) | 14 |
| Honduras | 4 (1993, 1995, 2011, 2017) | 3 (1991, 2005, 2013) | 2 (1999, 2009) | 2 (1997, 2003) | 11 |
| Guatemala | 1 (2001) | 5 (1995, 1997, 1999, 2003, 2014) | 3 (1991, 2005, 2007) | – | 9 |
| Panama | 1 (2009) | 2 (2007, 2017) | 3 (1993, 2011, 2014) | 2 (2001, 2005) | 8 |
| El Salvador | – | – | 6 (1995, 1997, 2001, 2003, 2013, 2017) | 7 (1991, 1993, 1999, 2007, 2009, 2011, 2014) | 13 |
| Belize | – | – | – | 1 (2013) | 1 |

Notes

Italic — Hosts

=== Medals ===
| Rank | Nation | Gold | Silver | Bronze | Total |
|---|---|---|---|---|---|
| 1 | Costa Rica (CRC) | 8 | 4 | 0 | 12 |
| 2 | Honduras (HON) | 4 | 3 | 2 | 9 |
| 3 | Guatemala (GUA) | 1 | 5 | 3 | 9 |
| 4 | Panama (PAN) | 1 | 2 | 3 | 6 |
| 5 | El Salvador (ESA) | 0 | 0 | 6 | 6 |
| Totals (5 entries) | | 14 | 14 | 14 | 42 |

== Overall statistics ==
| Pos | Team | Pld | W | D | L | GF | GA | GD | Pts |
|---|---|---|---|---|---|---|---|---|---|
| 1 | Costa Rica | 61 | 36 | 16 | 9 | 109 | 38 | +71 | 124 |
| 2 | Honduras | 60 | 34 | 12 | 14 | 108 | 49 | +59 | 114 |
| 3 | Guatemala | 51 | 23 | 14 | 14 | 63 | 48 | +15 | 83 |
| 4 | El Salvador | 63 | 22 | 14 | 27 | 62 | 72 | −10 | 80 |
| 5 | Panama | 52 | 21 | 13 | 18 | 56 | 52 | +4 | 76 |
| 6 | Nicaragua | 44 | 5 | 5 | 34 | 29 | 116 | −87 | 20 |
| 7 | Belize | 33 | 1 | 6 | 26 | 20 | 81 | −61 | 9 |

Updated to match(es) played on unknown. Source:

== See also ==
- UNCAF
- NAFU
- CFU
- North American Nations Cup
- Caribbean Cup/CFU Championship
