= El Salvador national football team results (1990–1999) =

Results of the El Salvador national football team

This article provides details of international football games played by the El Salvador national football team from 1990 to 1999.

== 1991 ==
4 April 1991 1991 UNCAF Nations Cup qualification	Nicaragua	2–3	El Salvador	Managua, Nicaragua
	Bendaña 60', 87'		Arce 25', 89' (pen.); Rivera 43'	Stadium: Dennis Martínez National Stadium; Attendance: 5,000

24 April 1991 1991 UNCAF Nations Cup qualification	El Salvador	2–0	Nicaragua	San Salvador, El Salvador
	Rodríguez 28'; Arce 62'			Stadium: Estadio Cuscatlán; Attendance: 2,000

26 May 1991 1991 UNCAF Nations Cup	El Salvador	0–0	Guatemala	San José, Costa Rica
10:00 CST				Stadium: Estadio Nacional de Costa Rica; Attendance: 1,000; Referee: Vincent Mauro (United States)

29 May 1991 1991 UNCAF Nations Cup	Costa Rica	7–1	El Salvador	San José, Costa Rica
20:30 CST	Jara 17', 41', 48'; Flores 21'; N. Gómez 63', 89'; R. Gómez 66'	Report	Arce 16'	Stadium: Estadio Nacional de Costa Rica; Attendance: 10,000; Referee: Arlington Success (Antigua and Barbuda)

2 June 1991 1991 UNCAF Nations Cup	El Salvador	1–2	Honduras	San José, Costa Rica
12:00 CST	Rivera 77'		Espinoza 2'; Machado 58'	Stadium: Estadio Nacional de Costa Rica; Attendance: 15,000; Referee: Jorge Meléndez (Guatemala)

8 December 1991 Friendly	El Salvador	1–1	Hungary	San Salvador, El Salvador
	González 52'		? (?)	Stadium: Estadio Cuscatlán; Attendance: 45,000

== 1992 ==
29 January 1992 Friendly	El Salvador	0–3	CIS	San Salvador, El Salvador
			Pyatnitsky 8'; Ledyakhov 22'; Kiryakov 63'	Stadium: Estadio Cuscatlán; Attendance: 10,000

19 February 1992 Friendly	El Salvador	2–0	United States	San Salvador, El Salvador
	Castro 18'; Guerro 62'			Stadium: Estadio Cuscatlán; Attendance: 45,000

4 March 1992 Friendly	Costa Rica	2–0	El Salvador	San José, Costa Rica
	? (?); ? (?)			Stadium: Estadio Nacional de Costa Rica

17 March 1992 Friendly	Honduras	1–1	El Salvador	United States
	? (?)		Lozano 20'

29 April 1992 Friendly	El Salvador	1–1	Costa Rica	San Salvador, El Salvador
	Ulloa 20'		? (?)	Stadium: Estadio Cuscatlán; Attendance: 30,000

19 July 1992 1994 FIFA World Cup qualification	Nicaragua	0–5	El Salvador	Managua, Nicaragua
			Estrada 3'; González 17', 78'; Castro 21'; Ulloa 73'	Attendance: 4,642; Referee: Ramón Méndez (Costa Rica)

23 July 1992 1994 FIFA World Cup qualification	El Salvador	5–1	Nicaragua	San Salvador, El Salvador
	Castro 14', 47'; Cienfuegos 34'; González 48'; Ulloa 67'		Rostrán 65'	Stadium: Estadio Cuscatlán; Attendance: 8,272; Referee: José Luis Fuentes (Honduras)

26 July 1992 Friendly	El Salvador	1–2	Mexico	San Salvador, El Salvador
	Ulloa 20'		? (?); ? (?)	Stadium: Estadio Cuscatlán

12 August 1992 Friendly	Honduras	3–0	El Salvador	United States
	? (?); ? (?); ? (?)			Attendance: 15,000

13 September 1992 Friendly	El Salvador	3–1	Honduras	San Salvador, El Salvador
	Abrego 19'; Rivera 26'; Vásquez 82'		? (?)	Stadium: Estadio Cuscatlán; Attendance: 10,000

18 September 1992 Friendly	Honduras	1–1	El Salvador	Tegucigalpa, Honduras
	? (?)		Rivera 16'	Stadium: Estadio Tiburcio Carías Andino; Attendance: 10,000; Referee: 14,320

7 October 1992 Friendly	Mexico	2–0	El Salvador	United States
	? (?); ? (?)			Attendance: 35,000

18 October 1992 1994 FIFA World Cup qualification	Bermuda	1–0	El Salvador	Hamilton, Bermuda
	Lightbourne			Stadium: Bermuda National Stadium; Attendance: 4,000; Referee: Miguel Salas Castillo (Mexico)

25 October 1992 1994 FIFA World Cup qualification	El Salvador	1–1	Canada	San Salvador, El Salvador
	González 32'		Miller 86'	Stadium: Estadio Cuscatlán; Attendance: 16,342; Referee: Victor Hugo Rodriguez Ugaldo (Costa Rica)

1 November 1992 1994 FIFA World Cup qualification	El Salvador	4–1	Bermuda	San Salvador, El Salvador
	Palacios 22'; González 44'; Cienfuegos 52'; Rivera 56'		Goater 80'	Stadium: Estadio Cuscatlán; Attendance: 21,300; Referee: José Luis Fuentes (Honduras)

8 November 1992 1994 FIFA World Cup qualification	Canada	2–3	El Salvador	Burnaby, Canada
	Miller 13'; Mitchell 71'		Rivera 44'; Ulloa 52', 89'	Stadium: Swangard Stadium; Attendance: 6,278; Referee: Carlos Castellanos Orendain (Mexico)

22 November 1992 1994 FIFA World Cup qualification	Jamaica	0–2	El Salvador	Kingston, Jamaica
			Meléndez 8', 85'	Stadium: Independence Park; Attendance: 15,000; Referee: Berny Ulloa Morera (Costa Rica)

6 December 1992 1994 FIFA World Cup qualification	El Salvador	2–1	Jamaica	San Salvador, El Salvador
	Meléndez 21'; Arce 64'		Davis 35'	Stadium: Estadio Cuscatlán; Attendance: 36,625; Referee: Fredy Rolando Burgos Escobar (Guatemala)

== 1993 ==
17 February 1993 Friendly	Russia	2–1	El Salvador	United States
	? (?); ? (?)		Arce 60'	Attendance: 16,000

5 March 1993 1993 UNCAF Nations Cup	Costa Rica	1–0	El Salvador	Tegucigalpa, Honduras
	Gómez 67'			Stadium: Estadio Tiburcio Carías Andino

7 March 1993 1993 UNCAF Nations Cup	El Salvador	1–1	Panama	Tegucigalpa, Honduras
	Arce 48'		Ortega 83'	Stadium: Estadio Tiburcio Carías Andino

9 March 1993 1993 UNCAF Nations Cup	Honduras	3–0	El Salvador	Tegucigalpa, Honduras
	Suazo 35', 43', 79'			Stadium: Estadio Tiburcio Carías Andino

12 March 1993 Friendly	El Salvador	2–2	Bolivia	San Salvador, El Salvador
	Arce 41', 72'		? (?); ? (?)	Stadium: Estadio Cuscatlán

23 March 1993 Friendly	El Salvador	2–2	United States	San Salvador, El Salvador
	Arce 29'; Cienfuegos 69'		? (?); ? (?)	Stadium: Estadio Cuscatlán; Attendance: 23,000

4 April 1993 1994 FIFA World Cup qualification	El Salvador	2–1	Mexico	San Salvador, El Salvador
	Castro 41' (pen.); Renderos 77'		García 75'	Stadium: Estadio Cuscatlán; Attendance: 40,000; Referee: Armando Pérez Hoyos (Colombia)

11 April 1993 1994 FIFA World Cup qualification	Canada	2–0	El Salvador	Burnaby, Canada
	Bunbury 25'; Catliff 33'			Stadium: Swangard Stadium; Attendance: 6,968; Referee: Ramesh Ramdhan (Trinidad and Tobago)

18 April 1993 1994 FIFA World Cup qualification	Mexico	3–1	El Salvador	Mexico City, Mexico
	Ambríz 2'; García 55'; Ramírez 63'		Ulloa 86'	Stadium: Estadio Azteca; Attendance: 120,000; Referee: Mario Efraín Escobar López (Guatemala)

25 April 1993 1994 FIFA World Cup qualification	Honduras	2–0	El Salvador	Tegucigalpa, Honduras
	Bennett 28', 63'			Stadium: Estadio Tiburcio Carías Andino; Attendance: 25,000; Referee: Joaquin Urio Velázquez (Spain)

2 May 1993 1994 FIFA World Cup qualification	El Salvador	1–2	Canada	San Salvador, El Salvador
	González 58'		Catliff 27'; Mobilio 60'	Stadium: Estadio Cuscatlán; Attendance: 25,000; Referee: Arlington Success (Antigua and Barbuda)

9 May 1993 1994 FIFA World Cup qualification	El Salvador	2–1	Honduras	San Salvador, El Salvador
	Arce 2'; Ulloa 32'		Anariba 77' (pen.)	Stadium: Estadio Cuscatlán; Attendance: 3,500; Referee: Arturo Angeles (United States)

== 1995 ==
12 November 1995 Friendly	El Salvador	1–4	Yugoslavia	San Salvador, El Salvador
	Rodríguez 36'		? (?); ? (?); ? (?); ? (?)	Stadium: Estadio Cuscatlán; Attendance: 30,000

29 November 1995 1995 UNCAF Nations Cup	El Salvador	3–0	Belize	San Salvador, El Salvador
	Cienfuegos 55'; Osorio 58' (pen.); Arce 76'			Stadium: Estadio Cuscatlán; Attendance: 12,244

3 December 1995 1995 UNCAF Nations Cup	El Salvador	2–1	Costa Rica	San Salvador, El Salvador
	Osorio 62'; Cienfuegos 81'		Morales 32'	Stadium: Estadio Cuscatlán; Attendance: 33,715

7 December 1995 1995 UNCAF Nations Cup SF	El Salvador	0–1	Guatemala	San Salvador, El Salvador
			Rodas 16'	Stadium: Estadio Cuscatlán; Attendance: 42,000

10 December 1995 1995 UNCAF Nations Cup 3rd	El Salvador	2–1	Costa Rica	San Salvador, El Salvador
	Arce 18'; Rodríguez 45'		Fonseca 72'	Stadium: Estadio Cuscatlán; Attendance: 35,000

== 1996 ==
10 January 1996 1996 CONCACAF Gold Cup	Trinidad and Tobago	2–3	El Salvador	Anaheim, United States
	Latapy 59', 64'	Report	Arce 34', 72' (pen.); Cerritos 50'	Stadium: Anaheim Stadium; Attendance: 27,125; Referee: Benito Archundia (Mexico)

16 January 1996 1996 CONCACAF Gold Cup	United States	2–0	El Salvador	Anaheim, United States
	Wynalda 63'; Balboa 75'	Report		Stadium: Anaheim Stadium; Attendance: 52,345; Referee: Ramesh Ramdhan (Trinidad and Tobago)

5 May 1996 Friendly	Bolivia	1–1	El Salvador	United States
	? (?)		Medrano 25'	Attendance: 13,100

14 August 1996 Friendly	Honduras	2–0	El Salvador	Tegucigalpa, Honduras
	? (?); ? (?)			Stadium: Estadio Tiburcio Carías Andino; Attendance: 25,000

21 August 1996 Friendly	El Salvador	1–2	Honduras	San Salvador, El Salvador
	Medrano 62'		? (?); ? (?)	Stadium: Estadio Cuscatlán

30 August 1996 Friendly	United States	3–1	El Salvador	United States
	? (?); ? (?); ? (?)		Lazo 61'	Attendance: 18,661

8 September 1996 1998 FIFA World Cup qualification	Cuba	0–5	El Salvador	San Salvador, El Salvador
		Report	Rivera 22', 80'; Arce 49', 72'; Cienfuegos 83'	Stadium: Estadio Cuscatlán; Attendance: 32,000; Referee: Gerardo Enrique Mejia Centeno (Honduras)

19 September 1996 Friendly	El Salvador	0–1	Venezuela	San Salvador, El Salvador
			? (?)	Stadium: Estadio Cuscatlán; Attendance: 6,000

25 September 1996 Friendly	Guatemala	1–2	El Salvador	United States
	? (?)		Cerritos 49'; Renderos 64'	Attendance: 15,000

6 October 1996 1998 FIFA World Cup qualification	Panama	1–1	El Salvador	Panama City, Panama
	Cubillas 43'	Report	Arce 51'	Stadium: Estadio Rommel Fernández; Attendance: 8,500; Referee: Vanroy Burnes (Antigua and Barbuda)

21 October 1996 Friendly	Honduras	1–1	El Salvador	Tegucigalpa, Honduras
	? (?)		Montes 64'	Stadium: Estadio Tiburcio Carías Andino; Attendance: 4,711

3 November 1996 1998 FIFA World Cup qualification	Canada	1–0	El Salvador	Burnaby, Canada
	Bunbury 65'	Report		Stadium: Swangard Stadium; Attendance: 6,858; Referee: Ronald Gutiérrez (Costa Rica)

10 November 1996 1998 FIFA World Cup qualification	El Salvador	3–2	Panama	San Salvador, El Salvador
	Arce 43'; Iraheta 68'; Trigueros 88'	Report	Dely 11', 86'	Stadium: Estadio Cuscatlán; Attendance: 25,832; Referee: Zimmerman Boulos (United States)

20 November 1996 Friendly	Mexico	3–1	El Salvador	United States
	? (?); ? (?); ? (?)		? 75' (o.g.)

1 December 1996 1998 FIFA World Cup qualification	El Salvador	3–0	Cuba	San Salvador, El Salvador
	Renderos 3'; Arce 30'; Rodríguez 49'			Stadium: Estadio Cuscatlán; Attendance: 23,510; Referee: Arturo Angeles (United States)

15 December 1996 1998 FIFA World Cup qualification	El Salvador	0–2	Canada	San Salvador, El Salvador
			Watson 62'; Bunbury 66'	Stadium: Estadio Cuscatlán; Attendance: 15,233; Referee: Arturo Brizio Carter (Mexico)

== 1997 ==
13 March 1997 Friendly	El Salvador	0–0	Guatemala	San Salvador, El Salvador
				Stadium: Estadio Cuscatlán; Attendance: 28,000

6 April 1997 1998 FIFA World Cup qualification	Canada	0–0	El Salvador	Burnaby, Canada
		Report		Stadium: Swangard Stadium; Attendance: 8,312; Referee: Fernando Sánchez (Chile)

13 April 1997 Friendly	Guatemala	1–1	El Salvador	United States
	? (?)		Guerra 33'	Attendance: 7,800

16 April 1997 1997 UNCAF Nations Cup	Honduras	3–0	El Salvador	Guatemala City, Guatemala
	Velásquez 4', 25' (pen.); Núñez 78'			Stadium: Estadio Mateo Flores; Attendance: 7,500

20 April 1997 1997 UNCAF Nations Cup	El Salvador	2–0	Panama	Guatemala City, Guatemala
	Montes 63'; Guerra 77'			Stadium: Estadio Mateo Flores; Attendance: 15,000

23 April 1997 1997 UNCAF Nations Cup	Guatemala	1–0	El Salvador	Guatemala City, Guatemala
	Funes 55'			Stadium: Estadio Mateo Flores; Attendance: 15,000

25 April 1997 1997 UNCAF Nations Cup	Costa Rica	1–0	El Salvador	Guatemala City, Guatemala
	Arnáez 72'			Stadium: Estadio Mateo Flores; Attendance: 17,000

27 April 1997 1997 UNCAF Nations Cup	Honduras	0–0	El Salvador	Guatemala City, Guatemala
				Stadium: Estadio Mateo Flores; Attendance: 29,900

4 May 1997 1998 FIFA World Cup qualification	El Salvador	2–1	Costa Rica	San Salvador, El Salvador
	Arce 19'; Montes 57'	Report	Arnáez 58'	Stadium: Estadio Cuscatlán; Attendance: 35,611; Referee: Óscar Ruiz

18 May 1997 1998 FIFA World Cup qualification	Jamaica	1–0	El Salvador	Kingston, Jamaica
	Williams 22'	Report		Stadium: Independence Park; Attendance: 12,000; Referee: Márcio Rezende de Freitas (Brazil)

28 May 1997 Friendly	El Salvador	0–2	Ecuador	San Salvador, El Salvador
			? (?); ? (?)	Stadium: Estadio Cuscatlán; Attendance: 8,000

8 June 1997 1998 FIFA World Cup qualification	El Salvador	0–1	Mexico	San Salvador, El Salvador
			García 64'	Stadium: Estadio Cuscatlán; Attendance: 40,000; Referee: Hugo Cordero (Argentina)

29 June 1997 1998 FIFA World Cup qualification	El Salvador	1–1	United States	San Salvador, El Salvador
	Arce 60'	Report	Lassiter 57'	Stadium: Estadio Cuscatlán; Attendance: 29,000; Referee: René Ortubé (Bolivia)

10 August 1997 1998 FIFA World Cup qualification	Costa Rica	0–0	El Salvador	San José, Costa Rica
		Report		Stadium: Estadio Ricardo Saprissa Aymá; Attendance: 18,316; Referee: Nelson Cálix (Honduras)

14 September 1997 1998 FIFA World Cup qualification	El Salvador	4–1	Canada	San Salvador, El Salvador
	Nildeson 16'; Renderos 52'; Cienfuegos 57'; Arce 88'	Report	Bunbury	Stadium: Estadio Cuscatlán; Attendance: 27,767; Referee: Mario Efraín López (Guatemala)

24 September 1997 Friendly	Guatemala	1–0	El Salvador	United States
	? (?)			Attendance: 30,000

5 October 1997 1998 FIFA World Cup qualification	Mexico	5–0	El Salvador	Mexico City, Mexico
17:10 CST	Galindo 30', 38' (pen.); A. García 35'; Alves 48'; L. García 82'			Stadium: Estadio Azteca; Attendance: 115,000; Referee: Eduardo Gamboa (Chile)

9 November 1997 1998 FIFA World Cup qualification	El Salvador	2–2	Jamaica	San Salvador, El Salvador
	Nildeson 47'; Guerra 87'	Report	Burton 52'; Hall 78'	Stadium: Estadio Cuscatlán; Attendance: 34,200; Referee: José María García-Aranda (Spain)

16 November 1997 1998 FIFA World Cup qualification	United States	4–2	El Salvador	Foxborough, United States
	McBride 22', 28'; Henderson 49'; Preki 82'	Report	Nildeson 60'; Arce 62' (pen.)	Stadium: Foxboro Stadium; Attendance: 53,193; Referee: Pierluigi Collina (Italy)

== 1998 ==
21 January 1998 Friendly	El Salvador	2–0	Trinidad and Tobago	San Salvador, El Salvador
	Rivera 42'; Castro 65'			Stadium: Estadio Cuscatlán

29 January 1998 Friendly	El Salvador	1–1	Honduras	San Salvador, El Salvador
	Castro 57'		? (?)	Stadium: Estadio Cuscatlán; Attendance: 30,000

1 February 1998 1998 CONCACAF Gold Cup	El Salvador	0–0	Guatemala	Los Angeles, United States
		Report		Stadium: Los Angeles Memorial Coliseum; Attendance: 26,391; Referee: Ali Bujsaim (United Arab Emirates)

8 February 1998 1998 CONCACAF Gold Cup	El Salvador	0–4	Brazil	Los Angeles, United States
		Report	Edmundo 7'; Romário 19'; Élber 87', 90'	Stadium: Los Angeles Memorial Coliseum; Attendance: 55,017; Referee: Rodrigo Badilla (Costa Rica)

9 February 1998 1998 CONCACAF Gold Cup	Jamaica	2–0	El Salvador	Los Angeles, United States
	Gayle 41'; Simpson 62'	Report		Stadium: Los Angeles Memorial Coliseum; Attendance: 26,391; Referee: Mohammed Nazri (Malaysia)

== 1999 ==
19 March 1999 1999 UNCAF Nations Cup	Guatemala	1–1	El Salvador	San José, Costa Rica
	Ruiz 27'		Corrales 21'	Stadium: Estadio Nacional de Costa Rica; Attendance: 5,000

21 March 1999 1999 UNCAF Nations Cup	El Salvador	1–0	Nicaragua	San José, Costa Rica
	Corrales 34'			Stadium: Estadio Nacional de Costa Rica; Attendance: 19,105

24 March 1999 1999 UNCAF Nations Cup	Honduras	3–1	El Salvador	San José, Costa Rica
	Núñez 44', 77'; Ramírez 90'		Quintanilla 62'	Stadium: Estadio Nacional de Costa Rica; Attendance: 5,000; Referee: Bynoe (Trinidad and Tobago)

26 March 1999 1999 UNCAF Nations Cup	Guatemala	1–0	El Salvador	San José, Costa Rica
	García 55'			Stadium: Estadio Nacional de Costa Rica; Attendance: 7,000; Referee: Bynoe (Trinidad and Tobago)

28 March 1999 1999 UNCAF Nations Cup	Costa Rica	4–0	El Salvador	San José, Costa Rica
	Bryce 13'; Row 42'; Fonseca 46'; Wanchope 53' (pen.)			Stadium: Estadio Nacional de Costa Rica; Attendance: 10,000; Referee: Bardales (Honduras)

29 May 1999 Friendly	Colombia	1–2	El Salvador	United States
	? (?)		Montes 47'; Cerritos 63'	Attendance: 43,192

28 July 1999 Friendly	Guatemala	2–0	El Salvador	United States
	? (?); ? (?)

18 August 1999 Friendly	Greece	3–1	El Salvador	Greece
	? (?); ? (?); ? (?)		García 52' (pen.)	Attendance: 2,500

20 August 1999 Friendly	Greece	3–0	El Salvador	Greece
	? (?); ? (?); ? (?)			Attendance: 3,000

6 October 1999 2000 CONCACAF Gold Cup Qual.	El Salvador	1–1	Haiti	Los Angeles, United States
20:00 EDT	Montes 3'		Descolines 80'	Stadium: Los Angeles Memorial Coliseum; Attendance: 6,583; Referee: Ronald Gutiérrez (Costa Rica)

8 October 1999 2000 CONCACAF Gold Cup Qual.	Canada	2–1	El Salvador	Los Angeles, United States
20:00 EDT	Corazzin 9'; Fletcher 59'		Arce 47' (pen.)	Stadium: Los Angeles Memorial Coliseum; Attendance: 6,507; Referee: Benito Archundia (Mexico)

10 October 1999 2000 CONCACAF Gold Cup Qual.	Cuba	3–1	El Salvador	Los Angeles, United States
15:00 EDT	Bobadilla 43'; Prado 75'; Roldán 90'		Arce 63' (pen.)	Stadium: Los Angeles Memorial Coliseum; Attendance: 3,605; Referee: Rodrigo Badilla (Costa Rica)
