= Honduras national football team results (1990–1999) =

Honduras
1990–99 season

This is a list of the Honduras national football team results from 1990 to 1999.

== 1990 ==
January 1990 CAG	Honduras	3–1	Costa Rica	Tegucigalpa, Honduras
CST				Stadium: Estadio Tiburcio Carías Andino; Referee: Record: 6–8–13 (33:65)

January 1990 CAG	Honduras	0–1	Costa Rica	Tegucigalpa, Honduras
CST				Stadium: Estadio Tiburcio Carías Andino; Referee: Record: 6–8–14 (33:66)

January 1990 CAG	Honduras	4–0	Nicaragua	Tegucigalpa, Honduras
CST				Stadium: Estadio Tiburcio Carías Andino; Referee: Record: 7–1–1 (32:6)

January 1990 CAG	Honduras	1–0	Nicaragua	Tegucigalpa, Honduras
CST				Stadium: Estadio Tiburcio Carías Andino; Referee: Record: 8–1–1 (33:6)

== 1991 ==
12 May 1991 UNCPR	Panama	2–0	Honduras	Panama City, Panama
EST	Dely 14'; Piggott 53'			Stadium: Estadio Revolución; Attendance: 10,000; Referee: Berny Ulloa (CRC); Record: 11–1–2 (22:5)

19 May 1991 UNCPR	Honduras	3–0	Panama	San Pedro Sula, Honduras
CST	Vallejo 64' 70' 82'			Stadium: Estadio Francisco Morazán; Attendance: 21,000; Referee: Patricio Guevara (SLV); Record: 12–1–2 (25:5)

26 May 1991 UNC	Costa Rica	2–0	Honduras	San José, Costa Rica
12:00 CST	Gómez 11'; Jara 52'			Stadium: Estadio Nacional; Attendance: 15,000; Referee: Carlos Castellanos (MEX); Record: 6–8–15 (33:68)

29 May 1991 UNC	Guatemala	0–0	Honduras	San José, Costa Rica
18:30 CST				Stadium: Estadio Nacional; Attendance: 10,000; Referee: Berny Ulloa (CRC); Record: 9–11–8 (28:34)

2 June 1991 UNC	El Salvador	1–2	Honduras	San José, Costa Rica
10:00 CST	Rivera 77'		2' Espinoza; 58' Machado	Stadium: Estadio Nacional; Attendance: 15,000; Referee: Jorge Meléndez (GUA); Record: 11–7–11 (38:40)

28 June 1991 CGC	Canada	2–4	Honduras	Los Angeles, United States
PST	Mitchell 66' 80'		28' (pen.) Bennett; 34' Espinoza; 41' Cálix; 51' Dolmo	Stadium: Los Angeles Memorial Coliseum; Attendance: 13,374; Referee: Arturo Angeles (USA); Record: 5–1–2 (14:8)

30 June 1991 CGC	Honduras	5–0	Jamaica	Los Angeles, United States
PST	Cálix 27' 51'; Anariba 31'; Bennett 69'; Yearwood 89'			Stadium: Los Angeles Memorial Coliseum; Attendance: 4,797; Referee: Errol Forbes (TRI); Record: 4–0–0 (15:5)

3 July 1991 CGC	Honduras	1–1	Mexico	Los Angeles, United States
PST	Anariba 10'		57' Hermosillo	Stadium: Los Angeles Memorial Coliseum; Attendance: 36,703; Referee: Jay Majid (USA); Record: 1–3–10 (12:31)

5 July 1991 CGC	Costa Rica	0–2	Honduras	Los Angeles, United States
PST			37' Bennett; 79' Dolmo	Stadium: Los Angeles Memorial Coliseum; Attendance: 41,103; Referee: Arturo Angeles (USA); Record: 7–8–15 (35:68)

7 July 1991 CGC	United States	0–0 (4–3 p)	Honduras	Los Angeles, United States
PST				Stadium: Los Angeles Memorial Coliseum; Attendance: 39,873; Referee: Arturo Brizio (MEX); Record: 1–5–1 (5:5)
	Penalties
	Balboa (penalty scored); Vermes (penalty missed); Pérez (penalty missed); Caligiuri (penalty scored); Eck (penalty missed); Quinn (penalty missed); Kinnear (penalty scored); Clavijo (penalty scored)		(penalty scored) Castro; (penalty missed) Anariba; (penalty missed) Yearwood; (penalty scored) Dolmo; (penalty missed) Zapata; (penalty missed) Cálix; (penalty scored) Vallejo; (penalty missed) Espinoza

== 1992 ==
17 March 1992 Friendly	El Salvador	1–1	Honduras	Los Angeles, United States
PST	Lozano 20'		76' Aguirre	Referee: Record: 11–8–11 (39:41)

28 June 1992 Friendly	Honduras	4–0	Panama	Tegucigalpa, Honduras
CST	Bennett 22' 29' 68' 80'			Stadium: Estadio Tiburcio Carías Andino; Attendance: 9,100; Referee: Record: 13–1–2 (29:5)

30 June 1992 Friendly	Honduras	4–0	Panama	San Pedro Sula, Honduras
CST	Suazo 23' 25'; Cálix 32'; Obando 38'			Stadium: Estadio Francisco Morazán; Attendance: 6,000; Referee: Record: 14–1–2 (33:5)

8 July 1992 Friendly	Honduras	1–0	Colombia	Tegucigalpa, Honduras
CST	Bennett 31' (pen.)			Stadium: Estadio Tiburcio Carías Andino; Referee: Record: 2–0–0 (3:0)

19 July 1992 FWCQ	Guatemala	0–0	Honduras	Guatemala City, Guatemala
CST				Stadium: Estadio Mateo Flores; Attendance: 39,792; Referee: Majid Jay (USA); Record: 9–12–8 (28:34)

26 July 1992 FWCQ	Honduras	2–0	Guatemala	Tegucigalpa, Honduras
CST	Obando 86'; Suazo 88'			Stadium: Estadio Tiburcio Carías Andino; Attendance: 37,500; Referee: José Ramírez (MEX); Record: 10–12–8 (30:34)

12 August 1992 Friendly	El Salvador	0–3	Honduras	Los Angeles, United States
PST			47' Cálix; 78' Obando; 89' Castillo	Attendance: 15,000; Referee: Record: 12–8–11 (42:41)

13 September 1992 Friendly	El Salvador	3–1	Honduras	San Salvador, El Salvador
CST	Abrego 19'; Rivera 50' (pen.); Flores 82'		7' (pen.) Obando	Attendance: 15,000; Referee: Record: 12–8–12 (43:44)

18 September 1992 Friendly	Honduras	1–1	El Salvador	San Pedro Sula, Honduras
CST	Suazo 57'		16' Rivera	Stadium: Estadio Francisco Morazán; Attendance: 14,320; Referee: Handal (HON); Record: 12–9–12 (44:45)

22 September 1992 Friendly	Honduras	5–1	Jamaica	Tegucigalpa, Honduras
CST	Obando 48'; Cálix 53' 83'; Suazo 59'; Cruz 63'		28' Anglin	Stadium: Estadio Tiburcio Carías Andino; Attendance: 10,300; Referee: Nelson Cálix (HON); Record: 5–0–0 (20:6)

24 September 1992 Friendly	Honduras	7–0	Jamaica	San Pedro Sula, Honduras
CST	Obando 5' 19' 58'; Bennett 15'; Suazo 53'; Ávila 67' 76'			Stadium: Estadio Francisco Morazán; Attendance: 8,566; Referee: Record: 6–0–0 (27:6)

18 October 1992 Friendly	Honduras	1–0	(Argentina) Ferro Carril Oeste	Tegucigalpa, Honduras
	Suazo			Stadium: Estadio Tiburcio Carías Andino; Referee: Record: 1–0–0 (1:0)

8 November 1992 FWCQ	Costa Rica	2–3	Honduras	San José, Costa Rica
CST	Berry 3'; Arnáez 37'		47' Dolmo; 71' Smith; 83' Obando	Stadium: Estadio Nacional; Attendance: 15,000; Referee: Rafael Rodríguez (SLV); Record: 8–8–15 (38:70)

15 November 1992 FWCQ	Mexico	2–0	Honduras	Mexico City, Mexico
CST	de la Torre 12'; Uribe 62'			Stadium: Estadio Azteca; Attendance: 34,413; Referee: Raúl Domínguez (USA); Record: 1–3–11 (12:33)

22 November 1992 FWCQ	Saint Vincent and the Grenadines	0–4	Honduras	Kingstown, Saint Vincent and the Grenadines
AST			16' 22' Flores; 54' Suazo; 83' Bennett	Stadium: Arnos Vale Stadium; Attendance: 5,000; Referee: Alwyn Black (LCA); Record: 1–0–0 (4:0)

28 November 1992 FWCQ	Honduras	4–0	Saint Vincent and the Grenadines	Tegucigalpa, Honduras
CST	Smith 6'; Obando 23'; Flores 34'; Anariba 86'			Stadium: Estadio Tiburcio Carías Andino; Attendance: 3,000; Referee: Mario López (GUA); Record: 2–0–0 (8:0)

5 December 1992 FWCQ	Honduras	2–1	Costa Rica	Tegucigalpa, Honduras
CST	Flores 13'; Obando 49'			Stadium: Estadio Tiburcio Carías Andino; Attendance: 38,000; Referee: Mike Seifert (CAN); Record: 9–8–15 (40:71)

13 December 1992 FWCQ	Honduras	1–1	Mexico	Tegucigalpa, Honduras
CST	Suazo 50'		56' Uribe	Stadium: Estadio Tiburcio Carías Andino; Attendance: 25,000; Referee: Jack D'Aquila (USA); Record: 1–4–11 (13:34)

== 1993 ==
27 January 1993 Friendly	Peru	1–1	Honduras	Lima, Peru
PET	Carranza 42'		90' Róchez	Stadium: Estadio Nacional; Attendance: 8,000; Referee: Alberto Tejada (PER); Record: 1–1–0 (4:2)

29 January 1993 Friendly	Bolivia	3–1	Honduras	Cochabamba, Bolivia
BOT	Quinteros 4'; Villarroel 57' 75'		24' Suazo	Stadium: Estadio Félix Capriles; Attendance: 15,000; Referee: Record: 0–0–1 (1:3)

5 March 1993 UNC	Honduras	2–0	Panama	Tegucigalpa, Honduras
CST	Castro 11'; Suazo 82'			Stadium: Estadio Tiburcio Carías Andino; Attendance: 10,705; Referee: Berny Ulloa (CRC); Record: 15–1–2 (35:5)

7 March 1993 UNC	Honduras	2–0	Costa Rica	Tegucigalpa, Honduras
CST	Suazo 53'; Cálix 56'			Stadium: Estadio Tiburcio Carías Andino; Attendance: 11,100; Referee: Rafael Rodríguez (SLV); Record: 10–8–15 (42:71)

9 March 1993 UNC	Honduras	3–0	El Salvador	Tegucigalpa, Honduras
CST	Suazo 35' 43' 79'			Stadium: Estadio Tiburcio Carías Andino; Attendance: 9,859; Referee: Arturo Brizio (MEX); Record: 13–9–12 (47:45)

14 March 1993 Friendly	Honduras	0–0	Bolivia	San Pedro Sula, Honduras
CST				Stadium: Estadio Francisco Morazán; Attendance: 12,178; Referee: Argelio Sabillón (HON); Record: 0–1–1 (1:3)

16 March 1993 Friendly	Honduras	0–0	Bolivia	Tegucigalpa, Honduras
CST				Stadium: Estadio Tiburcio Carías Andino; Attendance: 8,000; Referee: José Ramírez (HON); Record: 0–2–1 (1:3)

25 March 1993 Friendly	Honduras	4–1	United States	Tegucigalpa, Honduras
CST	Suazo 55' 74'; Obando 62' (pen.); Flores 83'		45' Allnutt	Stadium: Estadio Tiburcio Carías Andino; Attendance: 24,000; Referee: Castro (HON); Record: 2–5–1 (9:6)

4 April 1993 FWCQ	Honduras	2–2	Canada	Tegucigalpa, Honduras
CST	Smith 41' (pen.); Obando 89' (pen.)		34' Catliff; 68' Bunbury	Stadium: Estadio Tiburcio Carías Andino; Attendance: 30,000; Referee: Noel Smith (JAM); Record: 5–2–2 (16:10)

11 April 1993 FWCQ	Mexico	3–0	Honduras	Mexico City, Mexico
CST	Flores 8'; Sánchez 77' (pen.); Ambríz 90'			Stadium: Estadio Azteca; Attendance: 120,000; Referee: Rónald Gutiérrez (CRC); Record: 1–4–12 (13:37)

18 April 1993 FWCQ	Canada	3–1	Honduras	Burnaby, Canada
PST	Mobilio 50'; Catliff 61' (pen.) 71'		17' Pineda	Stadium: Swangard Stadium; Attendance: 6,868; Referee: Nelson Rodríguez (VEN); Record: 5–2–3 (17:13)

25 April 1993 FWCQ	Honduras	2–0	El Salvador	Tegucigalpa, Honduras
CST	Bennett 28' 69'			Stadium: Estadio Tiburcio Carías Andino; Attendance: 25,000; Referee: Joaquín Urio (ESP); Record: 14–9–12 (49:45)

2 May 1993 FWCQ	Honduras	1–4	Mexico	Tegucigalpa, Honduras
CST	Flores 70'		1' A. García; 43' Flores; 52' L. García; 89' (o.g.) Smith	Stadium: Estadio Tiburcio Carías Andino; Attendance: 37,500; Referee: Márcio de Freitas (BRA); Record: 1–4–13 (14:41)

9 May 1993 FWCQ	El Salvador	2–1	Honduras	San Salvador, El Salvador
CST	Díaz 1'; Ulloa 33'		77' (pen.) Anariba	Stadium: Estadio Cuscatlán; Attendance: 35,000; Referee: Arturo Angeles (USA); Record: 14–9–13 (50:47)

10 July 1993 CGC	Honduras	5–1	Panama	Dallas, United States
CST	Gayle 25'; Bennett 51' 69' (pen.) 83' (pen.); Pineda 54'		30' Julio	Stadium: Cotton Bowl; Attendance: 11,642; Referee: Rodrigo Padilla (CRC); Record: 16–1–2 (40:6)

14 July 1993 CGC	Honduras	1–3	Jamaica	Dallas, United States
CST	Bennett 18' (pen.)		28' Jarrett; 48' Davis; 78' Boyd	Stadium: Cotton Bowl; Attendance: 13,771; Referee: Arturo Brizio (MEX); Record: 6–0–1 (28:9)

17 July 1993 CGC	United States	1–0	Honduras	Dallas, United States
CST	Lalas 29'			Stadium: Cotton Bowl; Attendance: 18,527; Referee: Robert Sawtell (CAN); Record: 2–5–2 (9:7)

== 1994 ==
3 May 1994 Friendly; MC	El Salvador	3–1	Honduras	Miami, United States
EST	Díaz 6' 29' 36'		67' Nicolás Suazo	Stadium: Miami Orange Bowl; Attendance: 10,000; Referee: Arturo Angeles (USA); Record: 14–9–14 (51:50)

5 May 1994 Friendly; MC	Honduras	2–1	Peru	Miami, United States
EST	Suazo 76' (pen.); Núñez 87'		31' Aguilar	Stadium: Miami Orange Bowl; Attendance: 8,000; Referee: Arturo Angeles (USA); Record: 2–1–0 (6:3)

8 June 1994 Friendly	Brazil	8–2	Honduras	San Diego, United States
PST	Romário 2' 32' 60'; Bebeto 37' 56'; Cafu 74'; Dunga 81'; Raí 86'		52' Cálix; 62' Dolmo	Stadium: Jack Murphy Stadium; Attendance: 21,320; Referee: Brian Hall (USA); Record: 0–0–1 (2:8)

11 June 1994 Friendly	Honduras	0–3	South Korea	Duncanville, United States
CST			7' Jeong-woon; 37' Sun-hong; 78' Joo-sung	Stadium: Duncanville Stadium; Attendance: 400; Referee: Zimmerman Boulos (USA); Record: 0–0–1 (0:3)

11 December 1994 Friendly	United States	1–1	Honduras	Fullerton, United States
PST	Kirovski 90'		68' Velásquez	Stadium: Titan Stadium; Attendance: 1,094; Referee: Arturo Angeles (USA); Record: 2–6–2 (10:8)

== 1995 ==
29 March 1995 Friendly	Brazil	1–1	Honduras	Goiânia, Brazil
BRT	Túlio 45' (pen.)		15' Carson	Stadium: Estádio Serra Dourada; Attendance: 23,643; Referee: Antônio Pereira (BRA); Record: 0–1–1 (3:9)

11 June 1995 Friendly	Honduras	0–1	Turkey	Toronto, Canada
EST			89' Kafkas	Stadium: Varsity Stadium; Attendance: 4,600; Referee: Tony Camacho (CAN); Record: 0–0–1 (0:1)

18 October 1995 Friendly	Jamaica	1–0	Honduras	Kingston, Jamaica
EST	Stewart			Stadium: Independence Park; Referee: Record: 6–0–2 (28:10)

29 November 1995 UNC	Honduras	2–0	Panama	Santa Ana, El Salvador
CST	Pineda 25'; Pavón 73'			Stadium: Estadio Óscar Quiteño; Attendance: 5,000; Referee: Rafael Rodríguez (SLV); Record: 17–1–2 (42:6)

3 December 1995 UNC	Guatemala	0–2	Honduras	Santa Ana, El Salvador
CST			47' Suazo; 89' Núñez	Stadium: Estadio Óscar Quiteño; Attendance: 2,461; Referee: Bennett (BLZ); Record: 11–12–8 (32:34)

7 December 1995 UNC	Costa Rica	1–1 (2–4 p)	Honduras	San Salvador, El Salvador
CST	Fonseca 55'		60' Williams	Stadium: Estadio Nacional Flor Blanca; Attendance: 42,000; Referee: Joshua Patlak (USA); Record: 10–9–15 (43:72)

10 December 1995 UNC	Guatemala	0–3	Honduras	San Salvador, El Salvador
CST			1' Núñez; 25' 57' Pavón	Stadium: Estadio Cuscatlán; Attendance: 10,777; Referee: Rafael Pedroza (PAN); Record: 12–12–8 (35:34)

== 1996 ==
10 January 1996 CGC	Canada	3–1	Honduras	Anaheim, United States
PST	Corazzin 7'; Holness 27' 60'		40' Carson	Stadium: Anaheim Stadium; Attendance: 27,125; Referee: Peter Pendergast (JAM); Record: 5–2–4 (18:16)

14 January 1996 CGC	Brazil	5–0	Honduras	Los Angeles, United States
PST	Caio 9' 81'; Jamelli 31' 61'; Sávio 80'			Stadium: Los Angeles Memorial Coliseum; Attendance: 20,708; Referee: Benito Archundia (MEX); Record: 0–1–2 (3:14)

6 March 1996 Friendly	Colombia	2–1	Honduras	Miami, United States
EST	Valenciano 34' 81'		13' Núñez	Stadium: Miami Orange Bowl; Attendance: 15,123; Referee: Raúl Domínguez (USA); Record: 2–0–1 (4:2)

27 March 1996 Friendly	Honduras	1–0	Nicaragua	Danlí, Honduras
CST				Stadium: Estadio Marcelo Tinoco; Referee: Record: 9–1–1 (34:6)

22 June 1996 Friendly	Honduras	1–0	Venezuela	San Pedro Sula, Honduras
CST	Martínez 90+2'			Stadium: Estadio Francisco Morazán; Attendance: 5,000; Referee: Argelio Sabillón (HON); Record: 1–0–0 (1:0)

24 July 1996 Friendly	Honduras	1–1	Panama	Tegucigalpa, Honduras
CST	Pavón 36'		84' Díaz	Stadium: Estadio Tiburcio Carías Andino; Attendance: 3,400; Referee: José Ramírez (HON); Record: 17–2–2 (43:7)

28 July 1996 Friendly	Honduras	0–0	Trinidad and Tobago	Tegucigalpa, Honduras
CST				Stadium: Estadio Tiburcio Carías Andino; Attendance: 1,800; Referee: Record: 2–4–0 (5:3)

4 August 1996 Friendly	Costa Rica	1–1	Honduras	San José, Costa Rica
CST	Delgado 54'		45' (pen.) Smith	Stadium: Estadio Nacional; Attendance: 7,000; Referee: Olger Mejías (CRC); Record: 10–10–15 (44:73)

7 August 1996 Friendly	Panama	2–1	Honduras	Panama City, Panama
EST	Mendieta 33' 65'		87' Smith	Stadium: Estadio Rommel Fernández; Attendance: 20,000; Referee: Roberto Moreno (PAN); Record: 17–2–3 (44:9)

11 August 1996 Friendly	Honduras	0–0	Costa Rica	Tegucigalpa, Honduras
CST				Stadium: Estadio Tiburcio Carías Andino; Attendance: 15,000; Referee: Argelio Sabillón (HON); Record: 10–11–15 (44:73)

14 August 1996 Friendly	Honduras	2–1	El Salvador	San Pedro Sula, Honduras
CST	Suazo 40' 48'		88' Montes	Stadium: Estadio Francisco Morazán; Attendance: 25,000; Referee: Óscar Bardales (HON); Record: 15–9–14 (53:51)

18 August 1996 Friendly	Guatemala	1–1	Honduras	Monterey Park, United States
PST	Plata 9'		65' Suazo	Attendance: 12,000; Referee: Arturo Angeles (USA); Record: 12–13–8 (36:35)

21 August 1996 Friendly	El Salvador	1–2	Honduras	San Salvador, El Salvador
CST	Medrano 62'		28' Pavón; 33' Zapata	Stadium: Estadio Cuscatlán; Referee: Victorino Rodríguez (SLV); Record: 16–9–14 (55:52)

25 August 1996 Friendly	Honduras	4–0	Cuba	Tegucigalpa, Honduras
CST	Castro 3'; Centeno 32' 85'; Pavón 36'			Stadium: Estadio Tiburcio Carías Andino; Attendance: 7,500; Referee: Geraldo Mejía (HON); Record: 4–1–5 (14:21)

28 August 1996 Friendly	Honduras	2–2	Cuba	San Pedro Sula, Honduras
CST	Santamaría 10'; Smith 84'		88' Hernández; 89' Cruz	Stadium: Estadio Francisco Morazán; Referee: Óscar Bardales (HON); Record: 4–2–5 (16:23)

15 September 1996 FWCQ	Jamaica	3–0	Honduras	Kingston, Jamaica
EST	Boyd 15' 51'; Whitmore 42'			Stadium: Independence Park; Attendance: 21,000; Referee: Ramón Méndez (CRC); Record: 6–0–3 (28:13)

21 September 1996 FWCQ	Honduras	2–1	Mexico	San Pedro Sula, Honduras
CST	Pavón 50'; Bennett 82' (pen.)		64' Ramírez	Stadium: Estadio Francisco Morazán; Attendance: 19,120; Referee: Raúl Domínguez (USA); Record: 2–4–13 (16:42)

13 October 1996 FWCQ	Saint Vincent and the Grenadines	1–4	Honduras	Kingstown, Saint Vincent and the Grenadines
AST	Chewitt 54'		7' 62' Suazo; 23' 42' Santamaría	Stadium: Arnos Vale Stadium; Attendance: 2,200; Referee: José Farías (CAN); Record: 3–0–0 (12:1)

21 October 1996 Friendly	Honduras	1–1	El Salvador	Tegucigalpa, Honduras
CST	Pavón 44'		64' Montes	Stadium: Estadio Tiburcio Carías Andino; Attendance: 4,711; Referee: José Ramírez (HON); Record: 16–10–14 (56:53)

26 October 1996 FWCQ	Honduras	0–0	Jamaica	San Pedro Sula, Honduras
CST				Stadium: Estadio Francisco Morazán; Attendance: 20,928; Referee: Raúl Domínguez (USA); Record: 6–1–3 (28:13)

1 November 1996 Friendly	Colombia	2–1	Honduras	New York City, United States
EST	Ramírez 41'; Ángel 66'		19' Centeno	Stadium: Shea Stadium; Attendance: 31,110; Referee: Esfandiar Baharmast (USA); Record: 2–0–2 (5:4)

6 November 1996 FWCQ	Mexico	3–1	Honduras	Mexico City, Mexico
CST	Galindo 32'; Hermosillo 34'; Alves 42'		69' Centeno	Stadium: Estadio Azteca; Attendance: 114,000; Referee: Rodrigo Badilla (CRC); Record: 2–4–14 (17:45)

17 November 1996 FWCQ	Honduras	11–3	Saint Vincent and the Grenadines	San Pedro Sula, Honduras
CST	Zatapa 3'; Suazo 11' 38' 50'; Cruz 19'; Pavón 30'; Centeno 48'; Membreño 65'; Núñez 69' 84'; Bennett 79'		37' Jack; 62' Guy; 75' Everad	Stadium: Estadio Francisco Morazán; Attendance: 4,378; Referee: Víctor Rodríguez (CRC); Record: 4–0–0 (23:4)

== 1997 ==
In 1997, Honduras participated in the UNCAF Nations Cup held in Guatemala. Some historians wrongly denote a friendly match between Honduras and Chile supposedly being played on 26 January in Santiago with a 3–2 victory for the South Americans; however, such game never took place. The confusion apparently derives from an exhibition game played that day between domestic clubs Universidad Católica and Olimpia in Miami, which ended 3–2 for the Chileans.

16 April 1997 UNC	Honduras	5–0	Panama	Guatemala City, Guatemala
CST	Velásquez 1' 11' 16' 45' (pen.); Guevara 73'			Stadium: Estadio Mateo Flores; Attendance: 15,975; Referee: Carlos Mendizábal (GUA); Record: 18–2–3 (49:9)

18 April 1997 UNC	El Salvador	0–3	Honduras	Guatemala City, Guatemala
CST			4' 45' (pen.) Velásquez; 78' Núñez	Stadium: Estadio Mateo Flores; Attendance: 8,000; Referee: Peter Prendergast (JAM); Record: 17–10–14 (59:53)

23 April 1997 UNC	Costa Rica	4–0	Honduras	Guatemala City, Guatemala
CST	Fonseca 5' 8' 71'; López 44'			Stadium: Estadio Mateo Flores; Attendance: 15,000; Referee: Néry Alfaro (SLV); Record: 10–11–16 (44:77)

25 April 1997 UNC	Guatemala	1–0	Honduras	Guatemala City, Guatemala
CST	Plata 50'			Stadium: Estadio Mateo Flores; Attendance: 26,000; Referee: Peter Prendergast (JAM); Record: 12–13–9 (36:36)

27 April 1997 UNC	El Salvador	0–0	Honduras	Guatemala City, Guatemala
CST				Stadium: Estadio Mateo Flores; Attendance: 29,900; Referee: Greivin Porras (CRC); Record: 17–11–14 (59:53)

== 1998 ==
21 January 1998 Friendly	Costa Rica	1–4	Honduras	Nicoya, Costa Rica
CST	Arnáez 10'		9' (o.g.) Morales; 52' Carson; 68' 72' Velásquez	Stadium: Estadio Chorotega; Referee: Rodrigo Badilla (CRC); Record: 11–11–16 (48:78)

29 January 1998 Friendly	El Salvador	1–1	Honduras	San Salvador, El Salvador
CST	Castro 57'		7' Velásquez	Stadium: Estadio Cuscatlán; Attendance: 22,000; Referee: Neftaly Recinos (SLV); Record: 17–12–14 (60:54)

1 February 1998 CGC	Honduras	1–3	Trinidad and Tobago	Oakland, United States
PST	Pavón 67'		36' Nixon; 40' 70' John	Stadium: Oakland Coliseum; Attendance: 11,234; Referee: Peter Prendergast (JAM); Record: 2–4–1 (6:6)

7 February 1998 CGC	Honduras	0–2	Mexico	Oakland, United States
PST			22' 87' Blanco	Stadium: Oakland Coliseum; Attendance: 36,240; Referee: Ali Bujsaim (UAE); Record: 2–4–15 (17:47)

17 November 1998 Friendly; HRT	Guatemala	3–3 (6–5 p)	Honduras	Los Angeles, United States
PST	Herrera 29'; Plata 43'; Valencia 65'		38' Serrano; 69' (pen.) Obando; 79' Pineda	Stadium: Los Angeles Memorial Coliseum; Attendance: 21,305; Referee: Pascual Rebolledo (MEX); Record: 12–14–9 (39:39)
	Penalties
	Plata (penalty scored); Miranda (penalty scored); García (penalty missed); Ramírez (penalty scored); Ruano (penalty scored); Gómez (penalty scored)		(penalty scored) A. Pineda; (penalty scored) Serrano; (penalty missed) Guifarro; (penalty scored) Romero; (penalty scored) J. Pineda; (penalty scored) Chirinos; (penalty missed) Sierra

18 November 1998 Friendly; HRT	El Salvador	1–2	Honduras	Los Angeles, United States
PST	Castro 49'		4' (pen.) Obando; 81' Pineda	Stadium: Los Angeles Memorial Coliseum; Attendance: 27,891; Referee: Pascual Rebolledo (MEX); Record: 18–12–14 (62:55)

== 1999 ==
In 1999, Honduras faced an African nation for the first time when they defeated Zambia in a friendly match with a 7–1 score.

19 March 1999 UNC	Belize	1–5	Honduras	San José, Costa Rica
CST	García 57'		13' Caballero; 34' Núñez; 65' Guevara; 77' Ramírez; 85' Bengoché	Stadium: Estadio Nacional; Referee: Fredy Burgos (GUA); Record: 1–0–0 (5:1)

21 March 1999 UNC	Costa Rica	0–1	Honduras	San José, Costa Rica
CST			14' Pavón	Stadium: Estadio Nacional; Attendance: 19,105; Referee: Rafael Rodríguez (SLV); Record: 12–11–16 (49:78)

24 March 1999 UNC	El Salvador	1–3	Honduras	San José, Costa Rica
CST	Quintanilla 62'		44' 78' Núñez; 90' Ramírez	Stadium: Estadio Nacional; Attendance: 5,000; Referee: Noel Bynoe (TRI); Record: 19–12–14 (65:56)

26 March 1999 UNC	Costa Rica	1–2	Honduras	San José, Costa Rica
CST	Fonseca 36'		10' (pen.) Clavasquín; 75' Pavón	Stadium: Estadio Nacional; Attendance: 7,000; Referee: León Padró (MEX); Record: 13–11–16 (51:79)

28 March 1999 UNC	Guatemala	2–0	Honduras	San José, Costa Rica
CST	Rodas 8'; Machón 89'			Stadium: Estadio Nacional; Attendance: 10,000; Referee: Rafael Rodríguez (SLV); Record: 12–14–10 (39:41)

21 May 1999 Friendly	Haiti	0–2	Honduras	Miami, United States
EST			10' 33' Pavón	Stadium: Miami Orange Bowl; Referee: Paul Tamberino (USA); Record: 6–0–3 (16:7)

10 November 1999 Friendly	Guatemala	1–1	Honduras	Guatemala City, Guatemala
CST	García 5'		40' Martínez	Stadium: Estadio Mateo Flores; Attendance: 18,000; Referee: Otto Martínez (GUA); Record: 12–15–10 (40:42)

17 November 1999 Friendly	Honduras	3–2	Trinidad and Tobago	San Pedro Sula, Honduras
CST	Velásquez 44'; Clavasquín 83' (pen.); Phillips 86'		72' John; 89' Glasgow	Stadium: Estadio Francisco Morazán; Attendance: 23,000; Referee: Ronald Gutiérrez (CRC); Record: 3–4–1 (9:8)

1 December 1999 Friendly	Peru	0–0	Honduras	Lima, Peru
PET				Stadium: Estadio Nacional; Attendance: 10,000; Referee: Catalán Peña (CHI); Record: 2–2–0 (6:3)

15 December 1999 Friendly	Honduras	7–1	Zambia	San Pedro Sula, Honduras
CST	Cárcamo 11'; Caballero 15' 89' de León 29'; Martínez 30'; Guevara 85' 86'		46' Tana	Stadium: Estadio Francisco Morazán; Attendance: 8,000; Referee: Vivian Rodríguez (HON); Record: 1–0–0 (7:1)

29 December 1999 Friendly	Costa Rica	1–1	Honduras	Alajuela, Costa Rica
CST	Medford 71'		89' García	Stadium: Estadio Alejandro Morera Soto; Attendance: 19,000; Referee: Carlos Batres (GUA); Record: 13–12–16 (52:80)

== Record ==
Description	Record	Goals
1990s record	48–28–29	191:125
All-time record	120–82–92	440:386
