= Livio Bendaña =

Livio Bendaña may refer to:

- Livio Bendaña (footballer, born 1935), Nicaraguan football striker and manager
- Livio Bendaña (footballer, born 1969), Nicaraguan football striker, and son of the footballer born 1935
