= 1991 UNCAF Nations Cup preliminary round =

1991 UNCAF Nations Cup qualifying
Tournament details
- Dates: April 4, 1991 – May 17, 1991
- Teams: 6 (from 1 confederation)

Tournament statistics
- Matches played: 6
- Goals scored: 12 (2 per match)
- Attendance: 37,000 (6,167 per match)
- Top scorer(s): (El Salvador) Raúl Díaz Arce (Honduras) Luis Orlando Vallejo (3 goals each)

The qualifying competition for the 1991 UNCAF Nations Cup was a football competition that was played from April 4, 1991, to May 12, 1991, to determine the 3 teams to join Costa Rica, who qualified automatically as hosts of the 1991 UNCAF Nations Cup. Six member associations participated in the qualifying process for the tournament places; however, Belize withdrew due to economic reasons.

== Qualifying group stage ==
=== Groups ===
==== Group A ====
Rank	Team	Pld	W	D	L	GF	GA	GD	Pts
1	Honduras	2	1	0	1	3	2	+1	2
2	Panama	2	1	0	1	2	3	−1	2

May 5, 1991

Panama	2–0	Honduras
Lynch 14'; Valdés 57'

Estadio Revolución, Panama City
Attendance: 10,000
Referee: Berny Ulloa (Costa Rica)

May 12, 1991

Honduras	3–0	Panama
Vallejo 64', 70', 82'

Estadio Francisco Morazán, San Pedro Sula
Attendance: 21,000
Referee: P. Guevara (SLV)

==== Group B ====
Rank	Team	Pld	W	D	L	GF	GA	GD	Pts
1	El Salvador	2	2	0	0	5	2	+3	4
2	Nicaragua	2	0	0	2	2	5	−3	0

April 4, 1991

Nicaragua	2–3	El Salvador
Bendaña 60', 87'		Arce 25', 89' (pen.); Rivera 43'

Estadio Nacional Dennis Martínez, Managua
Attendance: 5,000

April 24, 1991

El Salvador	2–0	Nicaragua
Rodríguez 28'; Arce 62'

Estadio Cuscatlán, San Salvador
Attendance: 2,000

==== Group C ====
Rank	Team	Pld	W	D	L	GF	GA	GD	Pts
1	Guatemala	Qualified through Bye							
2	Belize	Withdrew							

12 May 1991

Belize	w/o	Guatemala

May 17, 1991

Guatemala	w/o	Belize

Belize withdrew from the tournament, so Guatemala qualified automatically.

== Goalscorers ==
3 goals

- (El Salvador) Raúl Díaz Arce
- (Honduras) Luis Orlando Vallejo

2 goals

- (Nicaragua) Livio José Bendaña

1 goal

- (Honduras) Guillermo Rivera
- (El Salvador) Jorge Rodríguez
- (Panama) Oberto Lynch
- (Panama) Julio Dely Valdés
