= 1989 CONCACAF Championship =

Tournament details
- Dates: 19 March – 19 November
- Teams: 5 (from 1 confederation)

Final positions
- Champions: Costa Rica (3rd title)
- Runners-up: United States
- Third place: Trinidad and Tobago
- Fourth place: Guatemala

Tournament statistics
- Matches played: 18
- Goals scored: 29 (1.61 per match)
- Top scorer(s): Eight players (2 goals each)

The 1989 CONCACAF Championship was the tenth and final edition of the CONCACAF Championship held under the format of serving as qualification to the 1990 FIFA World Cup and having no host nation for the final round. The tournament would be succeeded by the CONCACAF Gold Cup in 1991.

Costa Rica narrowly emerged as champions on goal difference to win their third title and participate in their first World Cup. The United States finished runners-up by virtue of one goal and qualified for their first World Cup in forty years. The U.S. gained their first World Cup qualification in 40 years by beating Trinidad and Tobago in their last game by 1–0, with a goal dubbed "The Shot Heard Round the World".

A total of sixteen CONCACAF teams entered the competition. However, FIFA rejected the entry of Belize because of its debts to FIFA.

== Qualification ==
Five teams qualified from the two stage qualification process that ran from April to November 1988. Mexico were disqualified during this stage after having been found to have fielded over-aged players during the 1988 CONCACAF U-20 Tournament. Their scheduled opponents Costa Rica therefore advanced to the Final Round unopposed.

== Teams ==
- Costa Rica
- El Salvador
- Guatemala
- Trinidad and Tobago
- United States

== Final round ==
Team	Pld	W	D	L	GF	GA	GD	Pts	CRC	USA	TRI	GUA	SLV
Costa Rica	8	5	1	2	10	6	+4	11		1–0	1–0	2–1	1–0
United States	8	4	3	1	6	3	+3	11	1–0		1–1	2–1	0–0
Trinidad and Tobago	8	3	3	2	7	5	+2	9	1–1	0–1		2–1	2–0
Guatemala	6	1	1	4	4	7	−3	3	1–0	0–0	0–1		Canc.
El Salvador	6	0	2	4	2	8	−6	2	2–4	0–1	0–0	Canc.	

Source: RSSSF

Costa Rica won the 1989 CONCACAF Championship and, along with the United States, qualified for the 1990 FIFA World Cup.

19 March 1989

Guatemala	1–0	Costa Rica
Chacón 39' (pen.)

Estadio Mateo Flores, Guatemala City
Attendance: 32,093
Referee: Tony Evangelista (Canada)

2 April 1989

Costa Rica	2–1	Guatemala
Flores 42'; Coronado 78'		Rodas 51'

Estadio Nacional de Costa Rica, San José
Attendance: 25,003
Referee: John Meachin (Canada)

16 April 1989

Costa Rica	1–0	United States
Rhoden 14'

Estadio Nacional de Costa Rica, San José
Attendance: 26,271
Referee: José Antonio Garza (Mexico)

30 April 1989

United States	1–0	Costa Rica
Ramos 72'

Saint Louis Soccer Park, Fenton
Attendance: 8,500
Referee: Rodolfo Méndez (Honduras)

13 May 1989

United States	1–1	Trinidad and Tobago
Trittschuh 48'		Charles 88'

Murdock Stadium, Torrance
Attendance: 10,000
Referee: Luigi Agnolin (Italy)

28 May 1989

Trinidad and Tobago	1–1	Costa Rica
Jones 13'		Coronado 69'

National Stadium, Port of Spain
Attendance: 26,000
Referee: Edgardo Codesal (Mexico)

11 June 1989

Costa Rica	1–0	Trinidad and Tobago
Cayasso 2'

Estadio Nacional de Costa Rica, San José
Attendance: 18,282
Referee: José Joaquín Torres Cadena (Colombia)

17 June 1989

United States	2–1	Guatemala
Murray 3'; Eichmann 67'		Chacón 22'

Veterans Stadium, New Britain
Attendance: 10,500
Referee: Gordon Arrowsmith (Canada)

25 June 1989

El Salvador	2–4	Costa Rica
Rodriguez 24'; Rivas 63'		Cayasso 16'; Hidalgo 46'; Flóres 51', 75'

Estadio Cuscatlán, San Salvador
Attendance: 40,000
Referee: Arturo Brizio Carter (Mexico)

16 July 1989

Costa Rica	1–0	El Salvador
Fernández 55'

Estadio Nacional de Costa Rica, San José
Attendance: 26,473
Referee: Jorge Orellana Vimos (Ecuador)

30 July 1989

Trinidad and Tobago	2–0	El Salvador
Lewis 50', 61'

National Stadium, Port of Spain
Attendance: 23,000
Referee: Tony Evangelista (Canada)

13 August 1989

El Salvador	0–0	Trinidad and Tobago

Estadio Nacional, Tegucigalpa
Attendance: 16,882
Referee: Gonzalo Tejada (Honduras)

20 August 1989

Guatemala	0–1	Trinidad and Tobago
		Jamerson 57'

Estadio Mateo Flores, Guatemala City
Referee: Arturo Brizio Carter (Mexico)

3 September 1989

Trinidad and Tobago	2–1	Guatemala
Jones 10'; Jamerson 88'		Rodas 6'

National Stadium, Port of Spain
Referee: Horacio Cachay Díaz (Peru)

17 September 1989

El Salvador	0–1	United States
		Pérez 61'

Estadio Nacional, Tegucigalpa
Attendance: 3,700
Referee: Edgardo Codesal (Mexico)

8 October 1989

Guatemala	0–0	United States

Estadio Mateo Flores, Guatemala City
Attendance: 8,000
Referee: Elías Jácome (Ecuador)

5 November 1989

United States	0–0	El Salvador

Saint Louis Soccer Park, Fenton
Attendance: 8,500
Referee: John Meachin (Canada)

19 November 1989

Trinidad and Tobago	0–1	United States
		Caligiuri 30'

National Stadium, Port of Spain
Attendance: 35,000
Referee: Juan Carlos Loustau (Argentina)

19 November 1989

El Salvador	Not Played (Note: The matches between El Salvador and Guatemala, which were originally scheduled to both be played in Guatemala due to escalation in the Salvadoran Civil War, were scratched by mutual agreement as both teams could no longer qualify.)	Guatemala

Estadio Doroteo Guamuch Flores, Guatemala City, Guatemala

26 November 1989

Guatemala	Not Played	El Salvador

Estadio Doroteo Guamuch Flores, Guatemala City, Guatemala

1989 CONCACAF Championship winners

Costa Rica
Third title

== Goalscorers ==
2 goals

- (Costa Rica) Evaristo Coronado
- (Costa Rica) Juan Arnoldo Cayasso
- (Costa Rica) Leónidas Flores
- (Guatemala) Raúl Chacón
- (Guatemala) Julio Rodas
- (Trinidad and Tobago) Leonson Lewis
- (Trinidad and Tobago) Kerry Jamerson
- (Trinidad and Tobago) Philibert Jones

1 goal

- (Costa Rica) Carlos Hidalgo
- (Costa Rica) Gilberto Rhoden
- (Costa Rica) Pastor Fernández
- (Costa Rica) Roger Flores
- (El Salvador) Jaime Rodríguez
- (El Salvador) José María Rivas
- (Trinidad and Tobago) Hutson Charles
- (United States) Bruce Murray
- (United States) Eric Eichmann
- (United States) Hugo Perez
- (United States) Paul Caligiuri
- (United States) Steve Trittschuh
- (United States) Tab Ramos
