= Livio Bendaña (footballer, born 1935) =

Nicaraguan footballer and coach

Personal information
- Full name: Livio Bendaña Espinoza
- Date of birth: September 22, 1935 (age 91)
- Place of birth: Diriamba, Nicaragua
- Position: Striker

Youth career
- Excelsior Mayor del IPD

Senior career*
Years	Team	Apps	(Gls)
1950–1954	Diriangén		
1956	Puebla		
1958	UNAN de León		
1959	Diriangén		
- Motagua
1963–1966	Diriangén		
1966	Antiguo ISA		
- MIlca de Managua
- Santa Cecilia

International career
1952–1967	Nicaragua		

Managerial career
- 1967–1970: Nicaragua
- 1966–1972: Diriangén
- * Club domestic league appearances and goals

Livio Bendaña Espinoza (born September 22, 1935 in Diriamba, Nicaragua) is a former Nicaraguan footballer and coach.

== Club career ==
Born in Diriamba, Bendaña joined local side Diriangén in 1950 and played his first game in 1952, aged 16. His father sent him to join a US military school instead of him moving to Costa Rican team Saprissa and on his return in 1956 he went to Mexico to play for Universidad Puebla. He joined Nicaraguan side UNAN de León in 1958 and had further spells at Diriangén and in Honduras with F.C. Motagua.

== International career ==
Nicknamed Pichichi, he played for the national team from 1952 through 1967.

== Personal life ==
His son, Livio José Bendaña, also became a striker with the national team in the 1980s and 1990s.
