= 1991 UNCAF Nations Cup =

Torneo de Naciones de la UNCAF Costa Rica 1991 (in Spanish)

Tournament details
- Host country: Costa Rica
- Dates: 26 May – 2 June
- Teams: 4 (from 1 sub-confederation)
- Venue: 1 (in 1 host city)

Final positions
- Champions: Costa Rica (1st title)
- Runners-up: Honduras
- Third place: Guatemala
- Fourth place: El Salvador

Tournament statistics
- Matches played: 6
- Goals scored: 14 (2.33 per match)
- Attendance: 77,500 (12,917 per match)
- Top scorer: (Costa Rica) Claudio Jara (5 goals)

The 1991 UNCAF Nations Cup was the inaugural UNCAF Nations Cup, the Central American championship for men's national association football teams. It was organized by the Unión Centroamericana de Fútbol or UNCAF, and it took place in Costa Rica from 26 May to 2 June 1991. All matches were played in the Costa Rican capital, San José at the Estadio Nacional. The top two teams, apart from Costa Rica, go on to participate in the 1991 CONCACAF Gold Cup. Costa Rica were given a bye due to their performance at the 1990 FIFA World Cup.

Three teams qualified to enter the tournament alongside hosts Costa Rica, chosen to hold the tournament by UNCAF that same year. The teams played in a round-robin format, with the winner being the squad who obtained the best overall results. The first UNCAF Nations Cup match took place between El Salvador and Guatemala. Since the match ended in a 0–0 draw, the following one between Costa Rica and Honduras produced the first goal in UNCAF Nations Cup history. It was scored by Róger Gómez of Costa Rica. The mascot of the competition was a boy named "Minchito '91".

Hosts and pre-tournament favourites Costa Rica earned 6 points from three wins after defeating Guatemala 1–0 in front of a crowd of 16,500 people, and became the first nation to win the UNCAF Nations Cup.

== Host selection ==
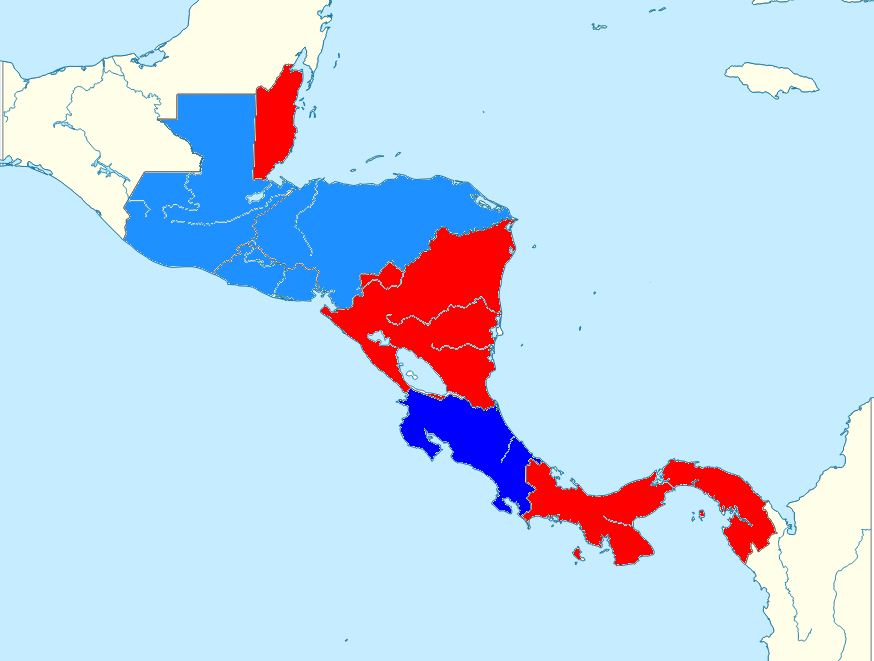
Host nation Countries that qualified Did not qualify

During the Confederation of North, Central American and Caribbean Association Football (CONCACAF) Congress in Guatemala City, Guatemala on 26 January 1991, the qualification rounds for the inaugural CONCACAF Gold Cup was decided upon. Since Costa Rica were given a bye into the competition due to its first place standing at the 1989 CONCACAF Championship, which also served as a qualification phase for the FIFA World Cup hosted by Italy in 1990, they weren't required to participate in the preliminary stages. However, the final qualification round of the Central American zone had two bids: the United States and Costa Rica. Costa Rica won the bid and was named by CONCACAF and UNCAF as the host nation of the inaugural UNCAF Nations Cup tournament on 19 February 1991.

== Qualification ==
The draw for the 1991 UNCAF Nations Cup qualifying competition for Central America took place in Guatemala City on 26 January 1991. Six teams entered to compete for the three remaining places in the competition, alongside eventual host Costa Rica. The teams were divided into three groups of two. As the host nation of the event, Costa Rica qualified automatically. The qualifying process began in April 1991 and concluded in May 1991. At the conclusion of the qualifying group stage, the three group winners qualified for the tournament.

=== Qualified teams ===
The following four teams qualified for the finals:

Country	Qualified as	Qualified on	Previous appearances in tournament
Costa Rica	Host nation	19 February 1991	0 (debut)
El Salvador	Group 2 winner	24 April 1991	0 (debut)
Guatemala	Group 3 winner	12 May 1991	0 (debut)
Honduras	Group 1 winner	12 May 1991	0 (debut)

== Match officials ==
A list of 13 referees from eight football federations for the tournament were chosen to participate in the tournament.

Referees

Antigua and Barbuda

- Arlington Success

Costa Rica

- Rodrigo Badilla
- Berny Ulloa
- Carlos Arrieta
- Ronald Gutiérrez
- Guillermo Hernández
- José Luis Vargas

El Salvador

- José Gómez

Guatemala

- Jorge Meléndez

Honduras

- José Luis Fuentes

Mexico

- Carlos Javier Castellanos

Panama

- Alberto Thomas

United States

- Vicente Mauro

== Venues ==
=== Stadium ===
The Estadio Nacional, Costa Rica's national stadium and home of the Costa Rica national football team, was announced as the sole venue of the tournament.

1991 UNCAF Nations Cup is located in Costa Rica	San José
1991 UNCAF Nations Cup is located in Costa Rica	Estadio Nacional
1991 UNCAF Nations Cup is located in Costa Rica	Capacity: 35,060

=== Accommodations ===
Hotels and base camps were used by the four national squads to stay and train
before and during the UNCAF Nations Cup tournament. All teams opted to stay
in hotels in San José.

Distribution of hotels in the 1991 UNCAF Nations Cup
Team	Site	City
Costa Rica	Hotel Tennis Club	San José
Guatemala	Hotel Plaza	San José
El Salvador	Hotel Ambassador	San José
Honduras	Hotel Ambassador	San José
CONCACAF Delegation	Hotel Corobicí	San José
UNCAF Delegation	Hotel Corobicí	San José
UNCAF Referees Committee & Officials	Hotel Europa	San José
VIPs	Hotel Corobicí	San José

=== Training grounds ===
Six venues were chosen as training grounds. Most teams opted to train
outside San José. Only Costa Rica trained in the national capital on privately
owned football pitches.

Training Grounds
Team	Venue	City
Costa Rica	Cancha Firestone	San José
Costa Rica	Cancha Republic Tobacco Company	San José
Costa Rica	Cancha Firestone	San José
Guatemala	Estadio Alejandro Morera Soto	Alajuela
Guatemala	Cancha Tabacalera Costarricense	San José
Honduras	Estadio Eladio Rosabal Cordero	Heredia
Honduras	Cancha Tabacalera Costarricense	San José
El Salvador	Estadio José Fello Meza	Cartago
El Salvador	Cancha Republic Tobacco Company	San José

== Mascot ==
Minchito '91 was the official tournament mascot.

Minchito '91, the mascot for the 1991 competition, was the first UNCAF Nations Cup mascot, and one of the first mascots to be associated with a major sporting competition in Central America. Inspired in "the traditions, beliefs, legends and customs of Costa Rica", Minchito was born as an authentic peasant. The boy, who is seven-years-old, was created by the Hispanic Publicity Company. The name is a diminutive of the name 'Benjamín' in Costa Rica. Minchito is dressed with a white shirt, a red scarf and belt with black shorts, the most common set of clothes of a Costa Rican peasant.

== Squads ==
Each team's squad consisted of 18 players (two of whom must be goalkeepers). Teams also had two additional reserve players they could use as replacements in the event of serious injury, at any time. During a match, all remaining squad members not named in the starting team are available to be one of the three permitted substitutions (provided the player is not serving a suspension).

== Tournament overview ==
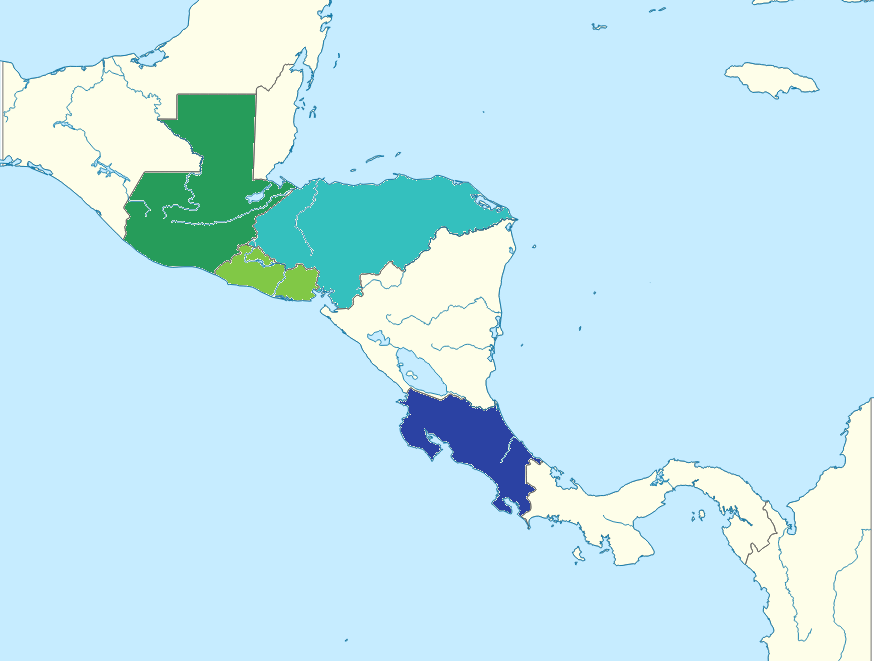
Champion Runner-up / Third place Fourth place

=== Format ===
All times are Central Time Zone (UTC-6) In the following tables:

- Pld = total games played
- W = total games won
- D = total games drawn (tied)
- L = total games lost
- GF = total goals scored (goals for)
- GA = total goals conceded (goals against)
- GD = goal difference (GF−GA)
- Pts = total points accumulated

The four teams played in round-robin format to determine the winner. This format would guarantee each team at least three games. Each team were awarded 2 points for a win and 1 point for a draw.

If two or more teams were equal on points on completion of the group matches, the following tie-breaking criteria were applied:

1. Greatest total goal difference in the three group matches
2. Greatest number of goals scored in the three group matches
3. If teams remained level after those criteria, a mini-group would be formed from those teams, who would be ranked on:
  1. Most points earned in matches against other teams in the tie
  2. Greatest goal difference in matches against other teams in the tie
  3. Greatest number of goals scored in matches against other teams in the tie
4. If teams remained level after all these criteria, UNCAF would hold a drawing of lots

=== Results ===
Team	Pld	W	D	L	GF	GA	GD	Pts
Costa Rica	3	3	0	0	10	1	+9	6
Honduras	3	1	1	1	2	3	−1	3
Guatemala	3	0	2	1	0	1	−1	2
El Salvador	3	0	1	2	2	9	−7	1

26 May 1991
10:00 CST (UTC-06)

El Salvador	0–0	Guatemala

Estadio Nacional, San José
Attendance: 11,000
Referee: Vincent Mauro (United States)
26 May 1991
12:00 CST (UTC-06)

Costa Rica	2–0	Honduras
Gómez 11'; Jara 52'	Report

Estadio Nacional, San José
Attendance: 15,000
Referee: Carlos Castellanos (Mexico)

29 May 1991
18:30 CST (UTC-06)

Guatemala	0–0	Honduras

Estadio Nacional, San José
Attendance: 10,000
Referee: Berny Ulloa (Costa Rica)
29 May 1991
20:30 CST (UTC-06)

Costa Rica	7–1	El Salvador
Jara 17', 41', 48'; Flores 21'; Gómez 63', 89'; Gómez 66'	Report	Arce 16'

Estadio Nacional, San José
Attendance: 10,000
Referee: Arlington Success (Antigua and Barbuda)

2 June 1991
10:00 CST (UTC-06)

El Salvador	1–2	Honduras
Rivera 77'		Espinoza 2'; Machado 58'

Estadio Nacional, San José
Attendance: 15,000
Referee: Jorge Meléndez (Guatemala)
2 June 1991
12:00 CST (UTC-06)

Costa Rica	1–0	Guatemala
Jara 32'	Report

Estadio Nacional, San José
Attendance: 16,500
Referee: José Luis Fuentes (Honduras)

== Statistics ==
=== Goalscorers ===
Claudio Jara received the Golden Boot for scoring five goals. In total, 14 goals were scored by 8 different players.

5 goals

- (Costa Rica) Claudio Jara

2 goals

- (Costa Rica) Róger Gómez
- (Costa Rica) Norman Gómez

1 goal

- (El Salvador) Raúl Díaz Arce
- (El Salvador) Guillermo Rivera
- (Honduras) Juan Carlos Espinoza
- (Honduras) Gilberto Machado
- (Costa Rica) Leonidas Flores

=== All-Star Team ===
Chilean sports magazine Triunfo evaluated player performances through statistical data finished with the following players leading each position.

Goalkeepers	Defenders	Midfielders	Forwards
Jorge Marotta (Guatemala)	Vladimir Quesada (Costa Rica); Gilberto Yearwood (Honduras); Eduardo Acevedo (Guatemala); Marco Anariba (Honduras)	Guillermo Rivera (El Salvador); Róger Gómez (Costa Rica); Carlos Velásquez (Costa Rica); Camilo Bonilla (Honduras)	Claudio Jara (Costa Rica); Leonidas Flores (Costa Rica)
