= Leonidas Flores =

Costa Rican footballer (born 1965)

Leony Flores
Personal information
- Full name: Leonidas Flores Reyes
- Date of birth: 24 January 1965 (age 61)
- Place of birth: La Palma de Abangares, Costa Rica
- Height: 1.80 m (5 ft 11 in)
- Position: Forward

Senior career*
Years	Team	Apps	(Gls)
1983–1988	Puntarenas		(93)
1989	Saprissa		
1992	Montreal Supra	18	(1)
1992–1994	San Carlos		
1995	Limonense		
1995–1996	Guanacasteca		(10)
1996	San Carlos		
Total			(118)

International career
1984	Costa Rica U23	2	
1984–1996	Costa Rica	30	(6)
- * Club domestic league appearances and goals

Leonidas Flores Reyes (born 24 January 1965) is a Costa Rican former professional footballer who played as a forward.

He played for Puntarenas, Saprissa, Guanacasteca and San Carlos.

== Club career ==
Born in La Palma de Abangares, Guanacaste, Flores started his career at Puntarenas in 1983 and won the 1986 Primera Division de Costa Rica title with them. He is also the club's all-time leading scorer with 93 goals and scored a total of 118 career goals, placed in position 17th all time Costa Rican strikers. He was the league's top goalscorer in 1986 with 19 goals.

He had a three-year spell abroad, at Canadian Soccer League side Montreal Supra.

== International career ==
Flores made 30 appearances for the Costa Rica national football team from 1984 to 1996. He also played at the 1984 Olympic Games in two games as sub.

Flores scored two goals as Costa Rica won the 1989 CONCACAF Championship, besides having his best performance, was left out from the Italy 1990 World Cup roster. According to Flores, he has never been explained why. Finally was able to return for the 1991 UNCAF Nations Cup and 1991 CONCACAF Gold Cup.

His final international was a September 1996 friendly match against Costa Rica.

== Retirement ==
After his football career he became a traffic policeman in Guanacaste. In September 2012, Flores was arrested on suspicion of charging "bribes" to drivers in exchange for not fining them for violating the traffic law.

== Personal life ==
He is married to Iris Ocampos.
