= Raúl Díaz Arce =

Salvadoran footballer (born 1970)

Personal information
- Full name: Raúl Ignacio Díaz Arce
- Date of birth: 1 February 1970 (age 56)
- Place of birth: San Rafael Obrajuelo, El Salvador
- Height: 1.75 m (5 ft 9 in)
- Position: Forward

Senior career*
Years	Team	Apps	(Gls)
1988–1990	Dragón		
1991–1996	Luis Ángel Firpo		
1996–1997	D.C. United	50	(38)
1998	New England Revolution	32	(18)
1999	San Jose Clash	18	(4)
1999–2000	Tampa Bay Mutiny	22	(13)
2000–2001	D.C. United	18	(6)
2001	Colorado Rapids	12	(3)
2002	Charleston Battery	24	(5)
2002	Águila	24	(5)
2003	Charleston Battery	26	(6)
2004	Puerto Rico Islanders	15	(7)
Total		241	(105)

International career
1991–2000	El Salvador	68	(39)
- * Club domestic league appearances and goals

Raúl Díaz Arce (born 1 February 1970) is a Salvadoran former professional footballer who played as a forward. He is currently the El Salvador national team's all-time top scorer, with 39 goals in just 68 appearances.

== Club career ==
From 1985 to 1986, Díaz Arce played for Deportivo Jalapa in Guatemala. From 1988 to 1991, Díaz Arce played for Dragón in the Salvadoran second division, where he was the league's leading scorer in the 1991–92 season with 21 goals. Playing for Dragón, in two seasons in first division, "Ignacio Raul" scored 34 goals (13 in 1989–90 and 21 in 1990–91); in the second season, he was the scoring champion of the regular season when he played four laps.

Díaz Arce then moved up to play for Luis Ángel Firpo of the Salvadoran first division from 1991 to 1996. Here he was the league's top scorer three seasons in a row (1993–1996) with 24, 21 and 25 goals, respectively. In total, he scored in five seasons with a total of 119 goals at the club. These early achievements earned him a spot in the national team and a move to the United States.

=== D.C. United ===
In 1996, Díaz Arce signed with Major League Soccer, and was drafted tenth overall in the MLS Inaugural Player Draft by D.C. United on 6 February. On 20 April, Díaz Arce recorded the first goal in D.C. United's history when he scored in the seventh minute against the LA Galaxy. He quickly established himself as a dangerous striker in the league, scoring 23 goals in his first season with United, second in the league behind Roy Lassiter. Díaz Arce was also the first player in MLS history to score a hat-trick in postseason play, netting three goals against the Tampa Bay Mutiny on 10 October 1996; D.C. United won 4–1 and went on to become the first MLS champions. Díaz Arce continued to perform well in his second season, registering fifteen goals, and helping D.C. United to win their second consecutive MLS Cup.

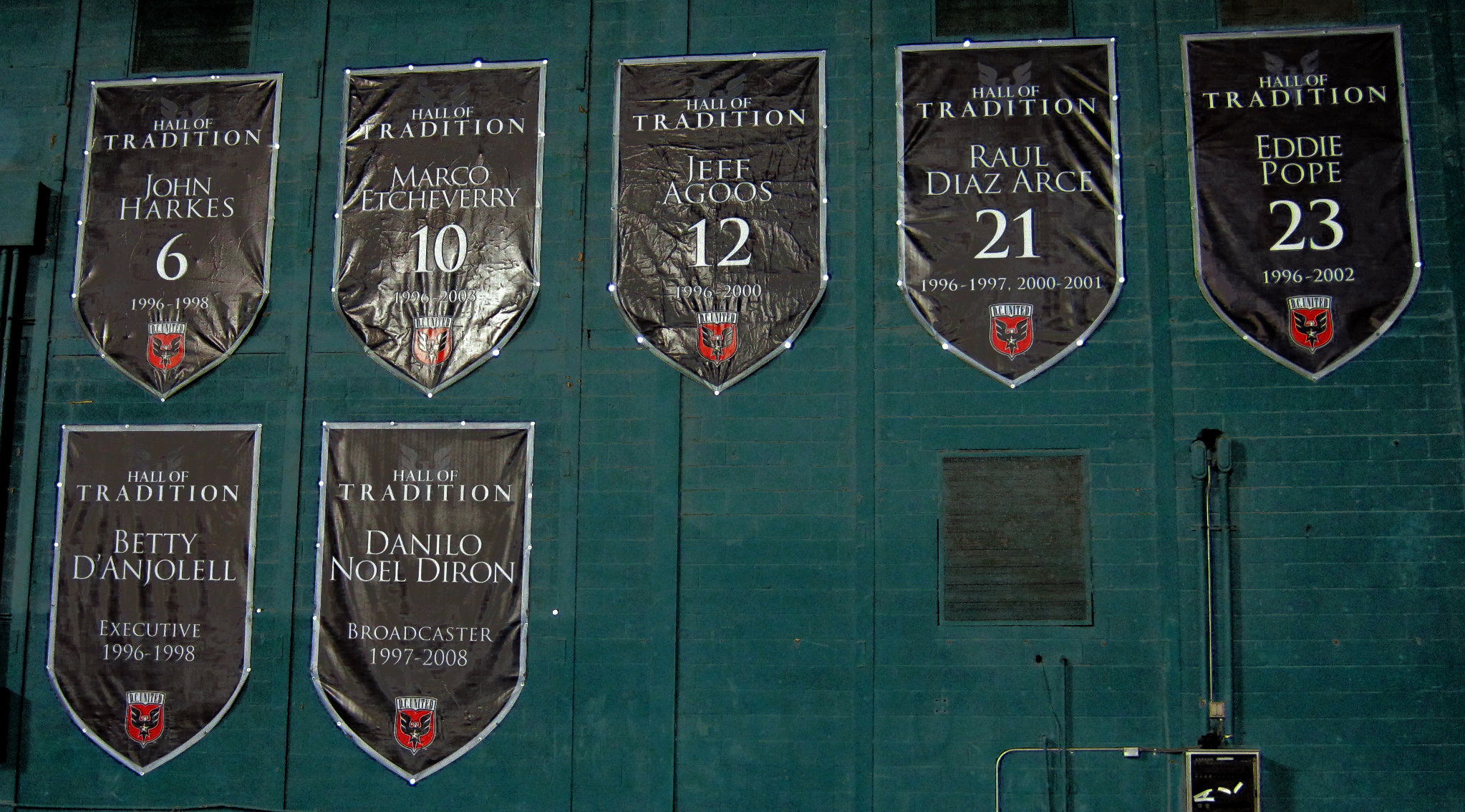
D.C. United Hall of Tradition

=== New England Revolution ===
Salary cap pressures and reported conflicts between Díaz Arce and Marco Etcheverry, resulted in D.C. trading one of the league's most prolific scorers to the New England Revolution. The deal was not well received by D.C. United's fanbase.

On 5 February 1998, in what would become the first three-team trade in MLS history, New England acquired Díaz Arce from D.C. United in exchange for Alexi Lalas and a second-round pick in the 1999 MLS College Draft, which were traded to the MetroStars with the MetroStars' second-round pick in the 1999 MLS College Draft and future considerations going to D.C. United along with New England's first-round pick in the 1999 MLS College Draft. Díaz Arce made his Revolution debut in the first match of a season, a loss to his former club, on 29 March 1998. He scored his first Revolution goal the following match, in a 2–1 defeat to the Miami Fusion on 4 April. Díaz Arce made his Revolution home debut on 18 April, providing an assist in a 1–1 draw against D.C. United in front of a crowd of 24,133 at Foxboro Stadium. The Revolution would lose the subsequent shoot-out.

Díaz Arce's success continued in New England. In the 1998 New England Revolution season, he started all 32 league matches, leading the team in minutes played and games played. He was named the Revolution's 1998 scoring champion, notching eighteen goals and recording eight assists. His eighteen-goal tally was the highest in a single season in club history for a Revs player – a record that would stand for four more seasons, until it was broken by Taylor Twellman in 2002. He represented New England in the 1998 MLS All-Star Game alongside his teammate Mike Burns.

On 20 January 1999, the Revolution traded Díaz Arce to the MetroStars in return for Giovanni Savarese and a second-round pick in the 2000 MLS SuperDraft.

=== End of MLS career ===
Nevertheless, Díaz Arce was traded again, and eventually played for the Tampa Bay Mutiny and San Jose Clash, as well as briefly with the MetroStars, registering thirteen goals and seven assists in the 1999 season. Díaz Arce continued to be shuttled around in 2000, playing for Tampa Bay and D.C. again in 2000, and scoring a career-low nine goals. Díaz Arce continued to decline in 2001, playing only briefly for D.C. United, before being traded again to the Colorado Rapids, with whom he ended his career in MLS.

Díaz Arce left MLS second in career goals scored with 82, behind only Roy Lassiter; although he has fallen as others have surpassed both of their totals.

=== Charleston & Puerto Rico ===
For the 2002 season, Díaz Arce played for the Charleston Battery of the A-League, recording six goals and four assists in 1319 minutes. He was not the success Charleston had hoped for, however, and left following the year. In 2004, Díaz Arce joined the struggling expansion Puerto Rico Islanders, and gave the team a significant boost, scoring two goals in his first match and a total of seven in 1,233 minutes, and helping the team attain a level of respectability. He is now the U.S. Soccer Development Academy Director at the Chicago Magico Soccer Club.

== International career ==
Díaz Arce made his debut for El Salvador in an April 1991 UNCAF Nations Cup qualification match against Nicaragua in which he scored two goals. Over his career, he earned a total of 68 caps, scoring a record 39 goals. He represented his country in 28 FIFA World Cup qualification matches and played at several UNCAF Nations Cups, as well as at the 1996 and 1998 CONCACAF Gold Cups. His final international was a September 2000 World Cup qualification match against Honduras.

=== International goals ===
Scores and results list El Salvador's goal tally first, score column indicates score after each Díaz Arce goal.

List of international goals scored by Raúl Díaz Arce
No.	Date	Venue	Opponent	Score	Result	Competition
1	4 April 1991	Dennis Martínez National Stadium, Managua, Nicaragua	Nicaragua	1–0	3–2	1991 UNCAF Nations Cup qualification
2	4 April 1991	Dennis Martínez National Stadium, Managua, Nicaragua	Nicaragua	3–2	3–2	1991 UNCAF Nations Cup qualification
3	24 April 1991	Estadio Cuscatlán, San Salvador, El Salvador	Nicaragua	2–0	2–0	1991 UNCAF Nations Cup qualification
4	29 May 1991	Estadio Nacional, San José, Costa Rica	Costa Rica	1–0	1–7	1991 UNCAF Nations Cup
5	6 December 1992	Estadio Cuscatlán, San Salvador, El Salvador	Jamaica	2–1	2–1	1994 FIFA World Cup qualification
6	18 February 1993	Los Angeles Memorial Coliseum, Los Angeles, United States	Russia	1–2	1–2	Friendly
7	7 March 1993	Estadio Tiburcio Carías Andino, Tegucigalpa, Honduras	Panama	1–0	1–1	1993 UNCAF Nations Cup
8	12 March 1993	Estadio Cuscatlán, San Salvador, El Salvador	Bolivia	1–1	2–2	Friendly
9	12 March 1993	Estadio Cuscatlán, San Salvador, El Salvador	Bolivia	2–1	2–2	Friendly
10	23 March 1993	Estadio Cuscatlán, San Salvador, El Salvador	United States	1–0	2–2	Friendly
11	9 May 1993	Estadio Cuscatlán, San Salvador, El Salvador	Honduras	1–0	2–1	1994 FIFA World Cup qualification
12	3 May 1994	Miami Orange Bowl, Miami, United States	Honduras	1–0	3–1	Miami Cup
13	3 May 1994	Miami Orange Bowl, Miami, United States	Honduras	2–0	3–1	Miami Cup
14	3 May 1994	Miami Orange Bowl, Miami, United States	Honduras	3–0	3–1	Miami Cup
15	29 November 1995	Estadio Cuscatlán, San Salvador, El Salvador	Belize	3–0	3–0	1995 UNCAF Nations Cup
16	10 December 1995	Estadio Cuscatlán, San Salvador, El Salvador	Costa Rica	1–0	2–1	1995 UNCAF Nations Cup
17	10 January 1996	Anaheim Stadium, Anaheim, United States	Trinidad and Tobago	1–0	3–2	1996 CONCACAF Gold Cup
18	10 January 1996	Anaheim Stadium, Anaheim, United States	Trinidad and Tobago	3–2	3–2	1996 CONCACAF Gold Cup
19	8 September 1996	Estadio Cuscatlán, San Salvador, El Salvador	Cuba	1–0	5–0	1998 FIFA World Cup qualification
20	8 September 1996	Estadio Cuscatlán, San Salvador, El Salvador	Cuba	4–0	5–0	1998 FIFA World Cup qualification
21	8 September 1996	Estadio Rommel Fernández, Panama City, Panama	Panama	1–1	1–1	1998 FIFA World Cup qualification
22	10 November 1996	Estadio Cuscatlán, San Salvador, El Salvador	Panama	1–1	3–2	1998 FIFA World Cup qualification
23	1 December 1996	Estadio Cuscatlán, San Salvador, El Salvador	Cuba	2–0	3–0	1998 FIFA World Cup qualification
24	4 May 1997	Estadio Cuscatlán, San Salvador, El Salvador	Costa Rica	1–0	2–1	1998 FIFA World Cup qualification
25	29 June 1997	Estadio Cuscatlán, San Salvador, El Salvador	United States	1–1	1–1	1998 FIFA World Cup qualification
26	14 September 1997	Estadio Cuscatlán, San Salvador, El Salvador	Canada	4–1	4–1	1998 FIFA World Cup qualification
27	16 November 1997	Foxboro Stadium, Foxborough, United States	United States	2–3	2–4	1998 FIFA World Cup qualification
28	8 October 1999	Los Angeles Memorial Coliseum, Los Angeles, United States	Canada	1–1	1–2	2000 CONCACAF Gold Cup qualification
29	10 October 1999	Los Angeles Memorial Coliseum, Los Angeles, United States	Cuba	1–1	1–3	2000 CONCACAF Gold Cup qualification
30	29 February 2000	Estadio Jorge "Mágico" González, San Salvador, El Salvador	Panama	2–0	3–1	Friendly
31	29 February 2000	Estadio Jorge "Mágico" González, San Salvador, El Salvador	Panama	3–1	3–1	Friendly
32	5 March 2000	Estadio Cuscatlán, San Salvador, El Salvador	Belize	3–0	5–0	2002 FIFA World Cup qualification
33	28 March 2000	Estadio Jorge "Mágico" González, San Salvador, El Salvador	Haiti	1–0	3–1	Friendly
34	2 April 2000	Estadio Doroteo Guamuch Flores, Guatemala City, Guatemala	Guatemala	3–0	5–0	2002 FIFA World Cup qualification
35	16 April 2000	People's Stadium, Orange Walk Town, Belize	Belize	1–0	3–1	2002 FIFA World Cup qualification
36	7 May 2000	Estadio Cuscatlán, San Salvador, El Salvador	Guatemala	1–0	3–1	2002 FIFA World Cup qualification
37	23 July 2000	Estadio Cuscatlán, San Salvador, El Salvador	Saint Vincent and the Grenadines	5–1	7–1	2002 FIFA World Cup qualification
38	23 July 2000	Estadio Cuscatlán, San Salvador, El Salvador	Saint Vincent and the Grenadines	6–1	7–1	2002 FIFA World Cup qualification
39	23 July 2000	Estadio Cuscatlán, San Salvador, El Salvador	Saint Vincent and the Grenadines	7–1	7–1	2002 FIFA World Cup qualification

== Honours ==
Luis Ángel Firpo

- Primera División de Fútbol de El Salvador: 1991–92, 1992–93

D.C. United

- MLS Cup: 1996, 1997
- Supporters' Shield: 1997
- U.S. Open Cup: 1996

Charleston Battery

- USL First Division: 2003
- Southern Derby: 2003

Individual

- MLS All-Star: 1997, 1998, 1999
- D.C. United Hall of Tradition: 26 August 2009
- Salvadoran Primera División top scorer: 1990–91, 1993–94, 1994–95, 1995–96
