= Livio Bendaña (footballer, born 1969) =

Nicaraguan footballer

Personal information
- Full name: Livio José Bendaña Morales
- Date of birth: October 22, 1969 (age 57)
- Place of birth: Nicaragua
- Position: Forward

Senior career*
Years	Team	Apps	(Gls)
1984–1990	Diriangén		
1991	Juventus Managua		
1992	Diriangén		
1993	Walter Ferretti		
1994	Diriangén		
1995-1999	Walter Ferretti		

International career
1991–1997	Nicaragua	13	(0)
- * Club domestic league appearances and goals

Livio José Bendaña Morales (born 22 October 1969) is a Nicaraguan retired footballer.

== Club career ==
Nicknamed el Pollo (the Chicken), he made his professional debut for Diriangén on 8 March 1986 against Juventus Managua and scored his first goal against Real Estelí on 4 May that year. He also played for Hermanos Molina, Juventus, Real Estelí and Walter Ferretti. He scored 130 league goals in the 1990s to complete a career total of 148, scoring 4 goals in one match three times and making 6 hat-tricks.

== International career ==
The moustached Bendaña made his debut for Nicaragua in an April 1991 UNCAF Nations Cup qualification match against El Salvador and has earned a total of 13 caps (no goals). He has represented his country in 3 FIFA World Cup qualification matches and played at the 1993 and 1997 UNCAF Nations Cups.

== Personal life ==
Bendaña is son of legendary Nicaraguan footballer of the 1950s, Livio Bendaña Espinoza. His own son, Livio Bendaña Quintanilla, was at 12 years invited to train with Spanish giants Real Madrid. In 2000, Bendaña stood candidate to become mayor of Diriamba.
