= Róger Gómez =

Costa Rican footballer (born 1965)

Personal information
- Full name: Róger Gómez Tenorio
- Date of birth: February 7, 1965 (age 61)
- Place of birth: Palmar Sur, Costa Rica
- Position: Midfielder

Senior career*
Years	Team	Apps	(Gls)
1990	Cartaginés		
1992–1995	Herediano		(38)
1995	Turrialba		
1997–1999	Pérez Zeledón		
1999–2002	Municipal Osa		
Total		524	(119)

International career
1990–1992	Costa Rica	19	(4)

Managerial career
- 2000: Municipal Goicoechea
- 2003: Municipal Osa
- 2009–2010: Atlético Veragüense
- * Club domestic league appearances and goals

Róger Gómez Tenorio (born February 7, 1965) is a retired Costa Rican football player.

== Club career ==
Born in Palmar Sur, Gómez played for Municipal Osa, Cartaginés and Herediano and scored 119 league goals during his career, 38 of them for Herediano. He was dismissed by Herediano in November 1995 after a poor season.

He played a total of 524 matches in the Costa Rican Primera División from 1986 through 2002.

== International career ==
Nicknamed El Policía, he made his debut for Costa Rica in a May 1990 friendly match against Poland and earned a total of 19 caps, scoring 4 goals. He was part of the national team, that played in the 1990 FIFA World Cup held in Italy, and featured in three of their four games played. He scored the first goal in the UNCAF Nations Cup history in 1991, and also played at the 1991 CONCACAF Gold Cup.

He played his final international on 8 November 1992 against Honduras.

=== International goals ===
Scores and results list Costa Rica's goal tally first.

N.	Date	Venue	Opponent	Score	Result	Competition
1.	26 May 1991	Estadio Nacional, San José	Honduras	1–0	2–0	1991 UNCAF Nations Cup
2.	29 May 1991	Estadio Nacional, San José	El Salvador	6–1	7–1	1991 UNCAF Nations Cup
3.	29 June 1991	Rose Bowl, Pasadena, United States	Guatemala	1–0	2–0	1991 CONCACAF Gold Cup
4.	27 November 1991	Memorial Coliseum, Los Angeles, United States	Mexico	1–1	1–1	Friendly match

== Managerial career ==
After retiring as a player, Gómez became a manager and was in charge of several local sides like Osa as well as of Panamanian side Atlético Veragüense.
