= Elías Montes =

Salvadoran footballer (born 1973)

Personal information
- Full name: Elías Bladimir Montes Alfaro
- Date of birth: December 25, 1973 (age 52)
- Place of birth: San Salvador, El Salvador
- Height: 1.67 m (5 ft 6 in)
- Position: Striker

Senior career*
Years	Team	Apps	(Gls)
1995	Tiburones		
1996–1999	Alianza		
1999–2000	Boston Bulldogs	17	(11)
2001–2002	Luis Ángel Firpo		
2002–2003	Alianza		
2004–2005	Coca-Cola	18	(5)
2006	Independiente Nacional 1906		
2007	Municipal Limeño		
2007	Once Municipal		(17)
2008–2009	Atlético Marte		
2009–2010	Isidro Metapán		
2011–2012	Atlético Marte		

International career^{‡}
1996–2000	El Salvador	32	(7)
- * Club domestic league appearances and goals as of 6 August 2011 ‡ National team caps and goals as of 6 August 2011

Elías Bladimir Montes Alfaro (born December 25, 1973, in San Salvador) is a Salvadoran professional football player.

His position is striker or forward.

== Club career ==
Montes started his career at Tiburones before joining Salvadoran giants Alianza in 1996. Montes came second in goal scoring in the 1998–99 season when with Alianza FC. He left them to move abroad in 1999 but returned to El Salvador for the 2001–02 season after two seasons in the US with the Boston Bulldogs. On his return at Alianza he was primarily being used as a sub so he left them for a spell at Second Division side Coca-Cola scoring loads of goals and whom he led to the Premier Division.

After switching clubs several times more in the years thereafter he signed for Marte in 2011.

== International career ==
Montes made his debut for El Salvador in an August 1996 friendly match against Honduras and has earned a total of 32 caps, scoring 7 goals. He was part of the national football team for the 1998 and 2002 World Cup campaigns and has represented his country in 10 FIFA World Cup qualification matches and played at the 1997 and 1999 UNCAF Nations Cups.

His final international game was a September 2000 World Cup qualification match against Honduras.
