= Israel Castro (footballer, born 1975) =

Footballer (born 1975)

Israel Castro Franco
Personal information
- Date of birth: April 11, 1975 (age 51)
- Place of birth: Curitiba, Brazil
- Height: 1.83 m (6 ft 0 in)
- Position: Striker

Senior career*
Years	Team	Apps	(Gls)
1996–1999	Luis Ángel Firpo		
2000–2001	Juventus-SP		
2000	Atlético Paranaense		
2002	Imortal		
2002–2004	Luis Ángel Firpo		
2005	Portuguesa		
2005–2006	Chalatenango		
2006	Combate Barreirinha		
2006	San Salvador		
2007	Once Municipal		
2007	CESP		
2008	TCW		
2009	Vila Fanny		

International career
1997–1998	El Salvador	13	(3)
- * Club domestic league appearances and goals

Israel Castro Franco (born April 11, 1975) is a former professional footballer who played as a striker. Born in Brazil, he played for the El Salvador national team.

== Club career ==
Castro spent the majority of his career in his adopted homeland El Salvador, mostly twice at Luis Ángel Firpo. He also played in his native Brazil and for a short period of time with the Portuguese lower league outfit Imortal de Albufeira.

== International career ==
Castro became a Salvadoran citizen in 1996. He made his debut for the El Salvador national team in an August 1997 FIFA World Cup qualification match against Costa Rica and has earned a total of 13 caps, scoring 3 goals. He thus participated in the 1998 FIFA World Cup campaign, playing four matches in the process, under the popular Serbian coach Milovan Đorić and represented his country at the 1998 CONCACAF Gold Cup.

His final international was a November 1998 friendly match against Honduras.

== Career statistics ==
Scores and results list El Salvador's goal tally first.

#	Date	Venue	Opponent	Score	Result	Competition
1	21 January 1998	Estadio Cuscatlán, San Salvador, El Salvador	Trinidad and Tobago	2–0	2–0	Friendly match
2	29 January 1998	Estadio Cuscatlán, San Salvador, El Salvador	Honduras	1–1	1–1	Friendly match
3	18 November 1998	Los Angeles Memorial Coliseum, Los Angeles, USA	Honduras	1–1	2–1	Hurricane Relief Tournament

== Honours ==
Atlético Paranaense

- Campeonato Paranaense: 2000

Luis Ángel Firpo

- Salvadoran Primera División: 1997–98
