= Guillermo Rivera (footballer) =

Salvadoran footballer (born 1969)

Personal information
- Full name: José Guillermo Rivera Escobar
- Date of birth: November 25, 1969 (age 56)
- Place of birth: San Rafael Cedros, El Salvador
- Height: 1.80 m (5 ft 11 in)
- Position: Midfielder

Youth career
- 1986–1987: CD FAS

Senior career*
Years	Team	Apps	(Gls)
1986–1998	CD FAS		
1999–2001	USAC		
2001–2005	AD Isidro Metapán		
2004–2005	Once Lobos		

International career
1988–2000	El Salvador	74	(15)

Managerial career
- 2008: CD Marte Soyapango
- 2009: El Salvador U-17
- 2010–2011: El Salvador (assistant)
- 2011–2012: CD Marte Soyapango
- 2013: Santa Tecla FC (interim / assistant coach)
- 2013–2014: CD Atlético Marte
- 2015: CD Dragón
- 2015–2018: Municipal Ilopaneco
- 2019: Jocoro FC
- 2019: El Salvador U-23
- 2019–2020: CD FAS
- 2020-2022: Platense
- 2023-2025: LA Firpo
- 2025: Once Deportivo
- * Club domestic league appearances and goals

José Guillermo Rivera Escobar (born November 25, 1969) is a retired Salvadoran professional football player.

== Club career ==
Nicknamed Memo, Rivera came through the youth ranks at FAS, where he would stay for over a decade and win two league titles. In 1999, he moved abroad for a stint at Guatemalan side USAC. He returned to El Salvador to play for Salvadoran second division side Isidro Metapán alongside fellow international William Renderos Iraheta and finished his career at Once Lobos.

== International career ==
Rivera made his debut for El Salvador in 1988 and has earned a total of 74 caps, scoring 15 goals. He has represented his country in 22 FIFA World Cup qualification matches and played at the 1991, 1993, 1995 and 1999 UNCAF Nations Cups and was a non-playing squad member at the 1996 CONCACAF Gold Cup but did play at the 1998 CONCACAF Gold Cup.

His final international game was an August 2000 FIFA World Cup qualification match against Jamaica.

=== International goals ===
Scores and results list El Salvador's goal tally first.

#	Date	Venue	Opponent	Score	Result	Competition
1	18 April 1991	Estadio Rigoberto López, Managua, Nicaragua	Nicaragua	-	3-2	1991 UNCAF Nations Cup qualification
2	2 June 1991	Estadio Ricardo Saprissa, San José, Costa Rica	Honduras	1-2	1-2	1991 UNCAF Nations Cup
3	13 September 1992	Estadio Cuscatlán, San Salvador, El Salvador	Honduras	2-1	3-1	Friendly match
4	17 September 1992	Estadio Olímpico Metropolitano, San Pedro Sula, Honduras	Honduras	1-0	1-1	Friendly match
5	1 November 1992	Estadio Cuscatlán, San Salvador, El Salvador	Bermuda	4-0	4-1	1994 FIFA World Cup qualification
6	8 November 1992	Swangard Stadium, Burnaby, Canada	Canada	1-1	3-2	1994 FIFA World Cup qualification
7	29 November 1995	Estadio Flor Blanca, San Salvador, El Salvador	Belize	2-0	3-0	1995 UNCAF Nations Cup
8	3 December 1995	Estadio Flor Blanca, San Salvador, El Salvador	Costa Rica	1-1	2-1	1995 UNCAF Nations Cup
9	5 May 1996	RFK Memorial Stadium, Washington, United States	Bolivia	1-1	1-1	Friendly match
10	8 September 1996	Estadio Cuscatlán, San Salvador, El Salvador	Cuba	1-0	5-0	1998 FIFA World Cup qualification
11	8 September 1996	Estadio Cuscatlán, San Salvador, El Salvador	Cuba	4-0	5-0	1998 FIFA World Cup qualification
12	21 January 1998	Estadio Cuscatlán, San Salvador, El Salvador	Trinidad and Tobago	1-0	2-0	Friendly match
13	29 February 2000	Estadio Flor Blanca, San Salvador, El Salvador	Panama	1-0	3-1	Friendly match
14	23 July 2000	Estadio Cuscatlán, San Salvador, El Salvador	Saint Vincent and the Grenadines	3-1	7-1	2002 FIFA World Cup qualification
15	23 July 2000	Estadio Cuscatlán, San Salvador, El Salvador	Saint Vincent and the Grenadines	4-1	7-1	2002 FIFA World Cup qualification

== Personal life ==
Rivera is married and has two children.
