= Julio Rodas =

Guatemalan footballer

Personal information
- Full name: Julio Alberto Rodas Hurtarte
- Date of birth: 9 December 1966 (age 59)
- Place of birth: Guatemala
- Height: 1.84 m (6 ft 1/2 in)
- Position: Striker

Senior career*
Years	Team	Apps	(Gls)
1988–1990	Municipal		
1990–1991	Deportivo Escuintla		
1991–1994	Municipal		
1995–1996	FAS		
1997–2001	Comunicaciones		
2002	Antigua GFC		
2004	Jalapa		

International career^{‡}
1988–2000	Guatemala	51	(10)
- * Club domestic league appearances and goals as of 12 May 2010 ‡ National team caps and goals as of 12 May 2010

Julio Alberto Rodas Hurtarte (born 9 December 1966) is a Guatemalan former professional football striker.

== Club career ==
At the club level, Rodas started his professional career playing for Municipal. He then had a one-season stint in El Salvador with C.D. FAS and later returned to Guatemala to play for Comunicaciones. During the latter part of his career, he played for Antigua GFC and Deportivo Jalapa.

== International career ==
Rodas was also a member of the Guatemala national team, and was selected as part of the squad that participated at the 1988 Olympic tournament. With the senior national team, he played during the World Cup qualification processes for the 1990, 1994, and 1998 tournaments.

Julio is the elder brother of Jorge, who was his teammate in Municipal and Comunicaciones and was also a member of the national team.
