= Berny Ulloa Morera =

Costa Rican football referee (born 1950)

- Full name: Berny Osvaldo Gerardo Ulloa Morera
- Born: August 5, 1950 (age 76); Costa Rica

International
Years	League	Role
1986	FIFA-listed	Referee

Berny Ulloa Morera (born August 5, 1950) is a retired football referee from Costa Rica. He officiated the match between Argentina and Bulgaria at the 1986 World Cup. He was a linesman in the famous game between England and Argentina in 1986 in which the Hand of God and Goal of the Century were scored by Diego Maradona. He was also a linesman in the final of the 1986 World Cup between Argentina and West Germany.
