= David Dóniga =

Spanish football manager (born 1981)

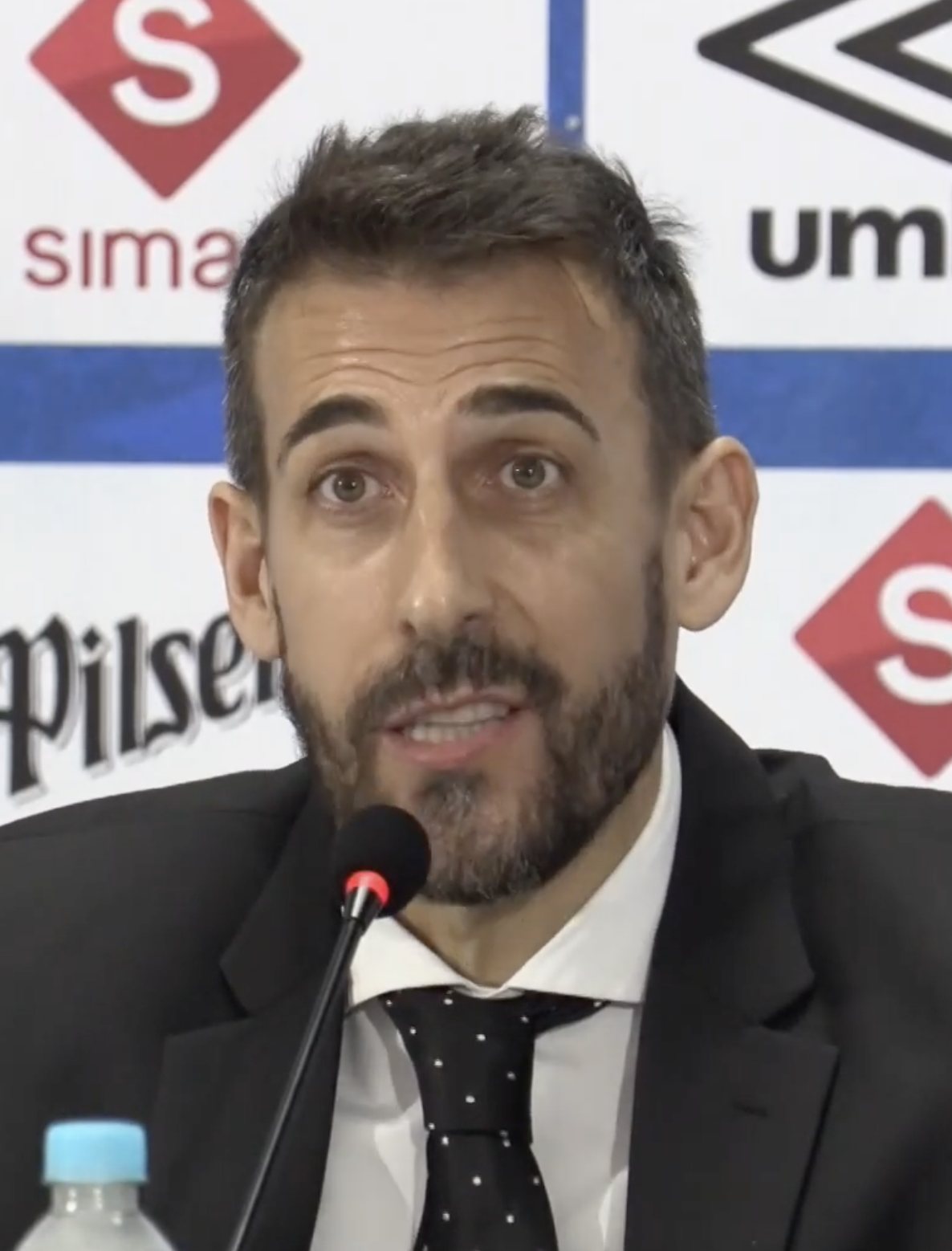
- Dóniga in 2024

Personal information
- Full name: David Dóniga Lara
- Date of birth: 7 September 1981 (age 45)
- Place of birth: Torrejón de Ardoz, Spain
- Position: Forward

Youth career
- Torrejón
- Real Madrid
- Guadalajara

Senior career*
Years	Team	Apps	(Gls)
2000	Guadalajara		

Managerial career
- 2004: Alcalá (youth)
- 2004–2005: Complutense (youth)
- 2005–2007: Soto Alcobendas (assistant)
- 2007–2008: San Fernando (assistant)
- 2009–2010: Talavera (assistant)
- 2010–2012: Toledo (assistant)
- 2015–2016: Deportivo La Coruña (assistant)
- 2016: Olympiacos (assistant)
- 2016–2017: Betis (assistant)
- 2019–2020: Málaga (assistant)
- 2020–2021: Qadsia (assistant)
- 2021–2022: Panama (assistant)
- 2021–2022: Panama U23
- 2022: 9 de Octubre
- 2023: San Miguelito
- 2024–2025: El Salvador
- * Club domestic league appearances and goals

David Dóniga Lara (born 7 September 1981) is a Spanish football manager and former player who played as a forward.

== Career ==
Born in Torrejón de Ardoz, Community of Madrid, Dóniga represented AD Torrejón CF before joining the youth categories of Real Madrid. He made his debut as a senior with CD Guadalajara, while being in charge of a youth school in Daganzo de Arriba.

Dóniga was a manager of the Alevín squads of local sides RSD Alcalá and AD Complutense before joining Soto de Alcobendas CF as an assistant. After leaving the club in 2007, he worked as Manolo Alfaro's assistant at CD San Fernando de Henares, Talavera CF and CD Toledo.

Dóniga worked as a fitness coach in Alfaro's staff at Bolivian side CD Jorge Wilstermann and Emirati club Al Wasl SC before being named Víctor Sánchez's assistant at Deportivo de La Coruña in 2015. He continued to work with Sánchez in the following years, at Olympiacos FC, Real Betis and Málaga CF.

In 2020, Dóniga joined Pablo Franco's staff at Qadsia SC in Kuwait. On 13 September 2021, he was named Thomas Christiansen's assistant in the Panama national team, while also being in charge of the under-23 team.

On 31 August 2022, Dóniga was appointed manager of Ecuadorian Serie A club 9 de Octubre FC. On 11 November of the same year, he resigned.

On 12 June 2023, Dóniga was appointed as head coach of Liga Panameña de Fútbol club Sporting San Miguelito. The following 2 January, he was named manager of the El Salvador national football team, succeeding his compatriot Rubén de la Barrera, who had left for Primeira Liga club Vizela.
