= Tommasini =

Tommasini is a surname of the following people:

- Anthony Tommasini (born 1948), American music critic and author
- Muzio Tommasini (1794–1879), Austrian botanist and politician from Trieste
- Nicolas Tommasini (born 1971), French business executive and entrepreneur
- Paolo Tommasini (born 1968), Italian sprint canoer
- Tommaso Tommasini (Bishop of Lesina) (died 1463), known as Thomas of Hvar
- Vincenzo Tommasini (1878–1950), Italian composer
- Vittorio Osvaldo Tommasini (1879–1964), Italian painter and poet, known as Farfa

== See also ==
- Acteosaurus tommasini, extinct lizard, named after Muzio Tommasini
- Tommasini's crocus, named after Muzio Tommasini
- Tomasini, a similar name
- Tomassini, a similar name
