= Tomasini =

Tomasini is an Italian surname. Notable people with the surname include:

- Doris Tomasini (born 1984), Italian sprinter
- Emilio Tomasini, Italian financial analyst
- Ernesto Tomasini (born 1968), Italian actor, singer and writer
- George Tomasini (1909–1964), American film editor
- Giacomo Filippo Tomasini (1595–1655), Italian Catholic bishop, scholar and historian
- Jeanne Tomasini (1920–2022), Corsican writer
- Luigi Tomasini (1741–1808), Italian violinist
- Stefano Tomasini (born 1963), Italian cyclist

== See also ==
- Tomasin, a similar name
- Tommasini, a similar name
- Tomassini, a similar name
