= Tomassini =

Tommasini is a surname of the following people:

- Alfredo Tomassini (1964–1987), Peruvian football player
- David Tomassini (born 2000), Sammarinese footballer
- Fabio Tomassini (born 1996), Sammarinese footballer
- Henrique Tomassini (1899–1975), Brazilian rower
- Roberto Tomassini (born 1962), Sammarinese cyclist
- Simone Tomassini (born 1974), Italian cantautori

== See also ==
- Tomasin, a similar name
- Tommasini, a similar name
- Tomasini, a similar name
