= Tomasino =

Tomasino is a surname. Notable people with the surname include:

- Carbilio Tomasino, Salvadoran football coach
- Jeana Tomasino (born 1955), American television personality
- Philip Tomasino (born 2001), Canadian ice hockey player
- Ricardo Tomasino, Salvadoran football coach
