= Tomasin =

Tomasin is a surname. Notable people with the surname include:

- Glauco Tomasin (born 1939), Italian football player and manager
- Jenny Tomasin (1938–2012), English actress
- Stephen Tomasin (born 1994), American rugby player

== See also ==
- Tomasini
- Tomasino
