= Héctor D'Angelo =

Argentine footballer and manager

Hector D'Angelo
Personal information
- Full name: Hector Alfredo D'Angelo
- Place of birth: Argentina
- Position: Midfielder

Senior career*
Years	Team	Apps	(Gls)
1948–1954	Banfield	114	(2)
1955	Huracán	27	(0)

Managerial career
- 1972: El Salvador
- 1972: Banfield
- 1973, 1975, 1978, 1983: Lanus
- Talleres (RE)
- Temperley
- 1986–1987: Banfield
- 1972: UES
- * Club domestic league appearances and goals

Hector Alfredo D'Angelo is an Argentine retired football player and manager. He has managed El Salvador national football team, Banfield, Lanus, Talleres (RE) and Temperley.
