= El Salvador national football team =

Men's association football team

El Salvador
- Nickname(s): La Selecta (The National Team); Los Cuscatlecos (The Cuscatlecos); La Azul y Blanco (The Blue and White); La ES (The ES)
- Association: Salvadoran Football Federation (FESFUT)
- Confederation: CONCACAF (North America)
- Sub-confederation: UNCAF (Central America)
- Head coach: Hernán Darío Gómez
- Captain: Julio Sibrián
- Most caps: Darwin Cerén (108)
- Top scorer: Raúl Díaz Arce (39)
- Home stadium: Estadio Cuscatlán; Estadio Jorge "El Mágico" González
- FIFA code: SLV
First colours	Second colours

FIFA ranking
- Current: 101 ▲1 (18 November 2026)
- Highest: 49 (April 2012)
- Lowest: 169 (November 2006)

First international
- Costa Rica 7–0 El Salvador (Guatemala City, Guatemala; 14 September 1921)

Biggest win
- El Salvador 12–0 Anguilla (San Salvador, El Salvador; 6 February 2008)

Biggest defeat
- Hungary 10–1 El Salvador (Elche, Spain; 15 June 1982)

World Cup
- Appearances: 2 (first in 1970)
- Best result: Group stage (1970, 1982)

CONCACAF Championship / Gold Cup
- Appearances: 20 (first in 1963)
- Best result: Runners-up (1963, 1981)

Olympic Games
- Appearances: 1 (first in 1968)
- Best result: Group stage (1968)

CCCF Championship
- Appearances: 7 (first in 1941)
- Best result: Champions (1943)
Medal record
CONCACAF Championship
Silver medal – second place	1963 El Salvador	Team
Silver medal – second place	1981 Honduras	Team
Bronze medal – third place	1977 Mexico	Team
CCCF Championship
Gold medal – first place	1943 El Salvador	Team
Silver medal – second place	1941 Costa Rica	Team
Silver medal – second place	1961 Costa Rica	Team
Copa Centroamericana
Bronze medal – third place	1995 El Salvador	Team
Bronze medal – third place	1997 Guatemala	Team
Bronze medal – third place	2001 Honduras	Team
Bronze medal – third place	2003 Panama	Team
Bronze medal – third place	2013 Costa Rica	Team
Bronze medal – third place	2017 Panama	Team
Central American and Caribbean Games
Gold medal – first place	1954 Mexico City	Team
Bronze medal – third place	1935 San Salvador	Team

The El Salvador national football team (Spanish: Selección de fútbol de El Salvador) represents El Salvador in men's international football, and is governed by the Salvadoran Football Federation (Spanish: Federación Salvadoreña de Fútbol), the governing body for football in El Salvador founded in 1935. It has been a full member of FIFA since 1938, is a founding member of CONCACAF which was founded in 1961, and is also a member of UNCAF in the Central American Zone. From 1938 to 1961, the team was a member of CCCF, the former governing body for football in Central America and Caribbean. El Salvador was also a member of PFC, the former unified confederation of the Americas.

El Salvador has qualified for the FIFA World Cup twice (1970 and 1982), and qualified once for the Olympic Games in 1968. El Salvador has participated twenty times in CONCACAF's premier continental competition, finishing as runners-up twice in the CONCACAF Championship (1963 and 1981). The team's best performance under the CONCACAF Gold Cup format was reaching the quarter-finals six times. The team has participated three times in League A and twice in League B of the CONCACAF Nations League.

In subcontinental competitions, the team won the 1943 CCCF Championship, and the gold medal at the 1954 Central American and Caribbean Games. It also finished as third place six times in the Copa Centroamericana.

The Estadio Cuscatlán, also known as "El Coloso de Montserrat" and "La Catedral del Espectáculo", is the official home stadium of the El Salvador national football team. Since 2017, the national team has had a kit sponsorship contract with England-based supplier Umbro. Raúl Díaz Arce is the all-time top-scorer for the national team, with 39 goals, while Darwin Cerén has the most caps, with 108 appearances.

== History ==
=== Beginnings ===
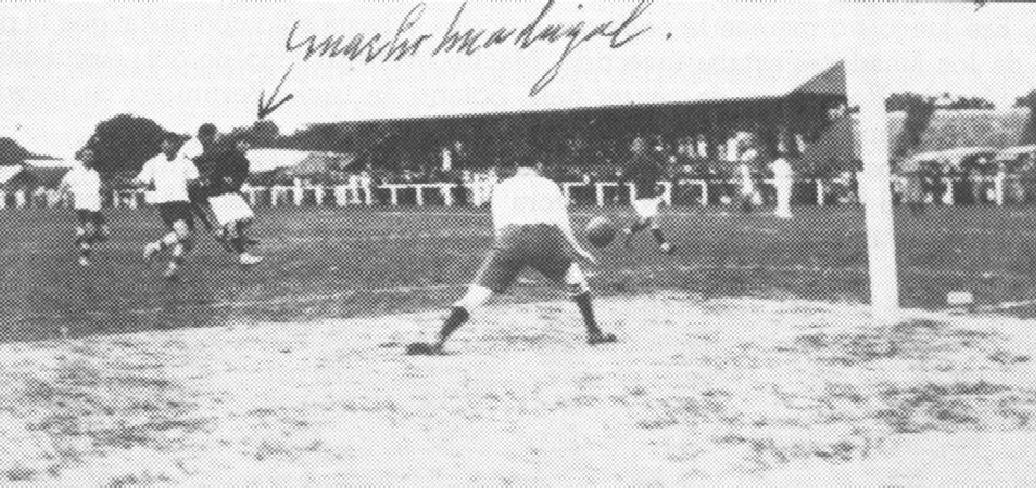
The first match of the El Salvador national team, 14 September 1921.

Although El Salvador played a few games in the early part of the twentieth century, they did not form an official national team until 1921, when players such as José Pablo Huezo, Carlos Escobar Leyva or Santiago Barrachina revolutionised football in the country. In September 1921, El Salvador were invited to Guatemala to take part in the Independence Centenary Games, to celebrate 100 years of Central American Independence. The tournament was contested by Guatemala, Honduras, Costa Rica, and El Salvador. The Guatemalans and Costa Ricans had more experience than the Salvadorans and Hondurans. It was a knockout tournament with Guatemala playing Honduras and El Salvador playing Costa Rica. El Salvador, wearing white shorts and black shirts, used a classic 2–3–5 scheme with their team consisting of Carlos Escobar Leyva; Spanish resident Santiago Barrachina, José Pablo Huezo; Benjamín Sandoval, Emilio Dawson, and Frenchman Emilio Detruit; Víctor Recinos, brothers Guillermo and José E. Alcaine, Guillermo Sandoval and Enrique Lindo. By half-time Costa Rica led 3–0, and at the final whistle, after two 40-minute halves, won 7–0.

El Salvador's other matches in the 1920s were friendlies against Costa Rica and Honduras. They lost their first friendly 3–0 against Costa Rica, while the second and third ended in a 1–0 loss and 0–0 draw against Honduras. On 7 December 1928, El Salvador recorded their first ever win, 5–0 over Honduras, the team that would become their traditional rivals, with Gustavo "Taviche" Marroquín scoring every goal. The game was played at Campo Marte, San Salvador, and was also the first time the team had scored in an international match.

=== 1930s ===
In the early 1930s, El Salvador appointed their first official national coach, the American Mark Scott Thompson, in preparation for the 1930 Central American and Caribbean Games in Havana. El Salvador finished in fourth place at the games. The Salvadoran Football Federation was founded in 1935. By this time, El Salvador were coached by the Spaniard, Pablo Ferre Elías. The 1935 Central American and Caribbean Games took place in El Salvador's new government-funded Estadio Flor Blanca, at that time the biggest stadium in the country. The Salvadoran squad consisted of Edmundo Majano as goalkeeper; Tobias Rivera and Raúl Castro in defence; Américo Gonzalez and Napoleon Cañas as midfielders; and Álex Morales, Rogelio Aviles, Fidel Quintanilla, Miguel "Americano" Cruz, and Andrés Hernández as strikers. Previously the national team had worn black and white striped jerseys and this was the first time they turned out in a blue strip. The team finished in third place as bronze medal winners.

In 1938, the Salvadoran Football Federation became affiliates of FIFA. El Salvador participated in the 1938 Central American and Caribbean Games, hosted in Panama, which were won by Mexico, with Costa Rica in second place. El Salvador won two and lost three of their five matches. A match for third place against Colombia was cancelled because of the bad state of the players, and El Salvador finished in fourth place.

=== 1940s ===
On 26 April 1940, the first national football federation was approved, with Dr. Luis Rivas Palacios as president. In 1941, the first Central American and Caribbean Championship (CCCF) took place in Costa Rica, organised by CONCACAF, the international governing body for football in North America, Central America and the Caribbean. El Salvador competed alongside Costa Rica, Curaçao, Nicaragua and Panama. El Salvador were runners-up, recording two wins, one draw and one loss.

The 1943 CCCF Championship took place in San Salvador with the participation of Costa Rica, Guatemala and Nicaragua. El Salvador were coached by the former national player Américo González. El Salvador and Guatemala finished with the same number of points, Guatemala failed to attend a deciding play-off, resulting in El Salvador winning their first international title. El Salvador's 10–1 win over Nicaragua set the team's record for the most goals scored in a single game. It was also the second time a Salvadoran player (Miguel "Americano" Cruz) had scored five goals in a match. El Salvador defended their title in the 1946 CCCF Championship in Costa Rica alongside six other participants and finished in third place, winning three matches and losing two. In the 1948 CCCF Championship, hosted in Guatemala, Costa Rica won the championship for the third time, with El Salvador finishing in fifth place.

=== 1950s ===
El Salvador did not participate in qualification for the World Cups in 1954, 1958, 1962 and 1966. During these years El Salvador had a good squad, including goalkeeper Manuel "Tamalón" Garay, Rafael "Chapuda" Reyes, Conrado Miranda, Miguel "Americano" Cruz, Rafael Corado and Mando Rivas.

In the group stage of the 1950 Central American and Caribbean Games in Mexico, El Salvador recorded two wins, one draw and one loss. They began the final round by beating Curaçao 3–1, but lost their other two matches, leaving them in fifth place. In 1953, El Salvador took part in their fifth CCCF Championship. The hosts, Costa Rica, became champions for the fourth time, and El Salvador finished in fifth place again.

At the 1954 Central American and Caribbean Games, El Salvador won their second international title under the Carbilio Tomasino, with a team consisting of Yohalmo Aurora, Manuel "Tamalón" Garay, Hugo Moreno, Armando Larín, Luis Regalado, Conrado Miranda, Fernando Barrios, Ramón "Pezote" Chávez, José Hernández, Mario Montoya, Juan Francisco "Cariota" Barraza, Ricardo "Chilenito" Valencia, Alfredo "Baiza" Ruano, and Obdulio Hernández. They began with a 2–2 draw against Colombia, and then beat Cuba 3–1, Mexico 3–2 and Panama 1–0 with a goal by Barraza. The win against Mexico, with two goals from Montoya and one from Valencia, was the first by a Central American team against Mexico.

In the 1955 CCCF Championship, hosted in Honduras, Costa Rica became champions for the fifth time, with El Salvador finishing fourth. El Salvador did not participate in the 1957 and 1960 CCCF Championships.

=== 1960s ===
El Salvador returned to participate in the 1961 CCCF Championship, hosted in Costa Rica, alongside nine other national teams. El Salvador were placed in a four-team first group with Honduras, the Netherlands Antilles, and Nicaragua, which they topped with two wins and a draw. In the final round they finished in second place behind Costa Rica, who won their seventh CCCF Championship. Afterwards the tournament was dissolved and replaced with the CONCACAF Championship.

In the first CONCACAF Championship, in 1963, El Salvador hosted both the qualification round and the final tournament. Costa Rica became the first champions, and El Salvador finished as runners-up. In 1964, the Chilean Hernán Carrasco Vivanco, who would later revolutionize Salvadoran football, became the coach of the national team. He led the national team for the first time at the 1965 CONCACAF Championship, hosted in Guatemala, where they won two games, drew one and lost two, finishing in fourth place. In 1966, El Salvador took part in the Central American and Caribbean Games for the sixth time, in Puerto Rico. They finished in fourth place.

In 1968, El Salvador qualified for the Olympic Games for the first time. They lost 4–0 to Hungary, 3–1 to Israel, and drew 1–1 with Ghana. The coach at this time was Rigoberto Guzmán.

Gregorio Bundio and his assistant José Santacolomba coached the team in the qualifying stages for the 1970 World Cup. This was the first time that El Salvador participated in World Cup qualifying. As hosts, Mexico qualified automatically, leaving one further qualification spot available for the CONCACAF region. El Salvador won Group 3, winning three and losing one. They qualified for a play-off against their traditional rivals, the Group 2 winners Honduras. The first game, on 8 June 1969 in the Honduran capital of Tegucigalpa, was won 1–0 by the home team and was followed by crowd violence. El Salvador won the second game 3–0 a week later in San Salvador, which was followed by even greater violence. A play-off match took place in Mexico City on 26 June, which El Salvador won 3–2 after extra time. On 14 July, as a result of existing tensions being exacerbated by these matches, the two countries began the hundred-hour-long conflict known as the Football War. As a result, El Salvador and Honduras were both disqualified from entering 1969 CONCACAF Championship qualification.

In the deciding World Cup qualifier, El Salvador faced Haiti. El Salvador won the away leg 2–1, with goals from Elmer Acevedo and Mauricio "Pipo" Rodríguez, but lost the second leg 3–0 at home. El Salvador finally won the play-off on 8 October with a goal by Juan Ramón "Mon" Martínez in extra time, allowing them to qualify for the World Cup finals at the first attempt.

"El Pajaro Picón Picón" was a Colombian song written by Eliseo Herrera which was very popular in El Salvador during the World Cup qualifying stages. During a radio show, Mauricio Bojórquez parodied the song, which he named "Arriba con la Selección". That parody became so famous that it became the official anthem of the El Salvador national football team.

=== 1970s ===
In the World Cup finals El Salvador were drawn into a group with Belgium, Mexico and the Soviet Union. El Salvador lost their first game 3–0 to Belgium in Mexico City on 3 June. The second match, against Mexico on 7 June, was marred by a controversial call near the end of the first half, with the score still at 0–0. The Egyptian referee Ali Kandil appeared to signal for a free kick to El Salvador in their own half. However, a Mexican player took the kick, passing to Javier Valdivia, who scored. The Salvadoran players protested vigorously, to the extent of physically jostling the Bermudan linesman, Keith Dunstan, but the goal was allowed to stand. El Salvador restarted the game by kicking the ball into the crowd in protest. They eventually lost 4–0. The team's third game took place on 10 June, with El Salvador losing 2–0 to the Soviet Union to finish at the bottom of Group A.

El Salvador advanced from the first round of 1971 CONCACAF Championship qualification by beating Nicaragua 4–2 on aggregate. In the second round, they withdrew from their play-off against Honduras, allowing their opponents to qualify by default. The national team also took part in the 1973 CONCACAF Championship qualification, which doubled as qualification for the 1974 World Cup, but they did not advance to the final stage after they were eliminated by Guatemala 2–0 on aggregate (1–0, 1–0). (Note: Some notes in this article indicate the two scores that add to the aggregate score; for example, (2–0,1–1) results in an aggregate score of 3–1—2–0 being the first match played and 1–1 being the second match played.) The team was managed by Hector D'Angelo.

El Salvador participated at the Pan American Games for the first time in 1975 in Mexico. They began with a 4–1 win against Nicaragua on 14 October, with a hat-trick from "Pajarito" Huezo, on the début of Francisco "Paco" Jovel. They then lost 2–0 to Brazil and drew 0–0 against Costa Rica, with "Pelé" Zapata missing a penalty. They finished in third place in Group D and failed to advance to the next round.

In 1977 CONCACAF Championship qualification, El Salvador finished second in their group, behind Guatemala and ahead of Costa Rica and Panama, to qualify for the final tournament, hosted in Mexico. They finished in third place, behind Haiti and Mexico, with the hosts winning the tournament. El Salvador participated in the 1978 Central American and Caribbean Games, hosted in Colombia. Cuba were crowned champions for the fourth time and El Salvador finished ninth.

=== 1980s ===
El Salvador played Costa Rica, Guatemala, Honduras and Panama in 1981 CONCACAF Championship qualification, in a home-and-away round-robin group with the top two teams advancing to the final tournament. El Salvador and Honduras finished with equal points at the top of the group, with Honduras winning the group on goal difference. Once again the finals doubled up as World Cup qualification, this time for the 1982 World Cup, with the top two of the six teams qualifying. Going into the final matches, El Salvador had four points and were in third place on goal difference, with Mexico and Canada both also having four points, behind Honduras with seven. On 19 November 1981, El Salvador beat Haiti 1–0, with a penalty by Norberto Huezo. On 21 November, Canada drew 2–2 with Cuba and were eliminated. In the decisive match the following day, Honduras and Mexico drew 0–0, meaning El Salvador qualified for the World Cup for the second time.

El Salvador took a 20-man squad to Spain, two players short of the maximum number allowed, as a controversial cost–saving measure. They were coached by "Pipo" Rodríguez. In their first match on 15 June in Elche, they were defeated 10–1 by Hungary, a World Cup Finals record margin of victory. A silver lining was that Luis Ramírez Zapata scored the country's first World Cup goal during the game, albeit when the Salvadorans were already 5–0 down. When Zapata scored, some Salvadorans cried out not to celebrate the goal because it might make the Hungarians angry and encourage them to score more. Displaying much-improved levels of organisation and commitment, El Salvador lost 1–0 to Belgium on 19 June in Elche and 2–0 to the world champions, Argentina, on 23 June in Alicante.

There were several reasons the tournament went so badly for El Salvador. First of all, their reduced squad meant that they omitted Gilberto Quinteros and Miguel González. According to Luis Guevara Mora, the 20-year-old goalkeeper, the Salvadoran Football Federation decided to take members of the Federation, as well as their friends and family, and spent so much money they could not afford to bring a full squad. The team took many stops throughout Europe under the direction of the Federation, taking three days to arrive in Spain and were the last team to do so. Once they arrived, there was more trouble. Adidas sent four white and three blue uniforms for each player, but only three white and one blue arrived. The remaining uniforms were said to have been taken away by the association. They decided to play with the white uniform and keep the blue as a keepsake. Next, someone stole the balls that the team needed to train with. The day before the match against Hungary, the Hungarians had the 25 balls the organization had given them while El Salvador had none and were unable to train. To make things even worse, El Salvador had never seen Hungary play, and the only knowledge that they had about the team was an outdated video that they had bought. On the field there were more problems. Hungary's fourth goal was caused by Francisco Jovel's sudden deafness after he had received a heavy blow on the cheek. When Guevara Mora called to him to stop a ball, the defender did not hear him, and the ball went past Jovel in front of the net. After the match, the Salvadoran squad had a tense meeting with the coaching staff and Federation. The coach was dismissed immediately and the matches against Belgium and Argentina were managed by players Jovel, Huezo and Fagoaga. Although the tournament overall was a big disappointment, Jorge "Mágico" González was considered by the national and international press as the best player, and he stayed in Spain to play for Cádiz CF and Real Valladolid.

In 1985 CONCACAF Championship qualification, El Salvador beat Puerto Rico 8–0 on aggregate (5–0, 3–0) to qualify for the final tournament. They were placed in a group with Honduras and Suriname, with the top team advancing. They finished second in the group with five points, one point behind Honduras. In 1989 CONCACAF Championship qualification they eliminated the Netherlands Antilles 6–0 on aggregate (1–0, 5–0). El Salvador finished last, with just two points, in the round-robin final tournament.

=== 1990s ===
At a CONCACAF congress, held in Guatemala on 26 January 1991, a new tournament, called the UNCAF Nations Cup, was conceived for Central American teams. The inaugural tournament was hosted in 1991, hosted by Costa Rica. The tournament also doubled as qualification for the CONCACAF Gold Cup, a new tournament which replaced the CONCACAF Championship. In qualification, La Selecta defeated Nicaragua 5–2 on aggregate (3–2, 2–0) and advanced to the final tournament. In the finals, they played three games, drawing one and losing two, finishing in last place and failing to advance to the 1991 CONCACAF Gold Cup. The 1993 UNCAF Nations Cup once again served as qualification to the Gold Cup, this time for the 1993 CONCACAF Gold Cup. Coached by Jorge Vieira, La Selecta advanced to the final tournament automatically. There they played three games, once again drawing one and losing two to finish last and fail to advance to the Gold Cup.

In 1994 World Cup qualification, El Salvador eliminated Nicaragua 10–1 on aggregate (5–0, 5–1) in the first round, then finished first in a group composed of Bermuda (0–1, 4–1), Canada (1–1, 3–2), and Jamaica (2–0, 2–1) in the second round. In the third round, El Salvador began with a win against Mexico at home, but lost their next four games, including two defeats against Canada. They beat Honduras 2–1 at home in their final game, but finished third in the group and were eliminated.

El Salvador hosted the 1995 UNCAF Nations Cup. In their first round, they topped a group containing Costa Rica and Belize, and lost 1–0 to Guatemala in the knockout round. They won the third place match 2–1 against Costa Rica and advanced to the 1996 CONCACAF Gold Cup alongside Guatemala and the tournament winners, Honduras. This was their first appearance at the Gold Cup. At the finals of the 1996 Gold Cup, El Salvador defeated Trinidad and Tobago 3–2, with goals from Raúl Díaz Arce (2) and Ronald Cerritos in their first game, but then lost 2–0 to the United States and did not advance from the first round.

At the 1997 UNCAF Nations Cup, hosted in Guatemala, El Salvador lost 3–0 to Honduras in their first match but defeated Panama 2–0 in their second. In the second group stage they finished in third place, losing 1–0 to both Guatemala and Costa Rica, and drawing 0–0 against Honduras. They advanced to the 1998 CONCACAF Gold Cup, hosted in the United States. El Salvador were coached by Kiril Dojčinovski. In the group stage, they drew 0–0 with Guatemala, and lost to Brazil (4–0) and Jamaica (2–0).

In 1998 World Cup qualification, El Salvador received a bye to the third round, where they were drawn into a group with Canada, Cuba, and Panama. They finished second behind Canada and advanced to the six-team final round. El Salvador finished in fifth place with two wins, four draws, and four defeats. This was the closest they had come to qualifying for a World Cup since 1982.

At the 1999 UNCAF Nations Cup, hosted in Costa Rica, El Salvador drew 1–1 with Guatemala and defeated Nicaragua 1–0 in the first round, with Magdonio Corrales scoring in both games. In the second group stage, they lost 3–1 to Honduras, 1–0 Guatemala and 4–0 to Costa Rica to finish bottom of the group, and failed to advance to the 2000 CONCACAF Gold Cup. They were coached by Mario Peres Ulibarri.

=== 2000s ===
In 2002 World Cup qualification, El Salvador topped a first round group ahead of Belize and Guatemala, but finished third behind and Jamaica in the second round, and were eliminated.

In the 2001 UNCAF Nations Cup in Honduras, El Salvador topped their first-round group, defeating Nicaragua 3–0, Panama 2–1, and drawing 1–1 with the hosts. In the final round they drew all their games to finish third and advance to the 2002 CONCACAF Gold Cup. They were coached by Carlos Recinos. In the Gold Cup, El Salvador lost their first match in Group A to Mexico (1–0), but defeated Guatemala by the same score, with a goal from Santos Cabrera. This allowed them to advance to the quarter-finals of the Gold Cup for the first time, but they lost 4–0 at that stage to the eventual champions, the United States.

At the 2003 UNCAF Nations Cup in Panama, El Salvador finished third again, with Juan Ramón Paredes as head coach. In the tournament, they won 2–1 against Panama, lost 1–0 to Costa Rica, beat Nicaragua 3–0 and Honduras 1–0, and lost 2–0 against Guatemala. They qualified for the 2003 CONCACAF Gold Cup, where they were drawn into Group C with Martinique and the United States. El Salvador 2–0 lost to the United States but beat Martinique 1–0 with a goal from Marvin González. In the quarter-finals, they were beaten 5–2 by Costa Rica, with three of the seven goals coming from penalty kicks.

The 2006 World Cup qualifiers and 2005 UNCAF Nations Cup, hosted in Guatemala, were both huge disasters for El Salvador. In the former they received a bye to the second round, where they inched past Bermuda 4–3 on aggregate (2–1, 2–2). In the third round they finished last in a group that contained Jamaica, Panama and the United States, with just four points from six games. In the 2005 UNCAF Nations Cup they went out in the first round after losing against Panama (1–0) and Costa Rica (2–1), which meant they also failed to qualify for the 2005 CONCACAF Gold Cup. They were coached by Carlos Cavagnaro.

Coached by Carlos de los Cobos, El Salvador hosted the 2007 UNCAF Nations Cup, and won their first-round group after 2–1 wins over Belize and Nicaragua, and a 0–0 draw with Guatemala. In the semi-finals, they lost 1–0 to the eventual champions, Costa Rica, and finished the tournament in fourth after Guatemala beat them by the same scored in the third place play-off. This allowed them to qualify for the 2007 CONCACAF Gold Cup, where they began with a 2–1 win against Trinidad and Tobago 2–1, with goals from Ramón Sánchez and Dennis Alas. They lost their next two matches against Guatemala (1–0) and the United States (4–0) and exited the tournament.

On 16 June 2007, El Salvador met Hungary at the Estadio Cuscatlán in a repeat of their match at the 1982 World Cup. Many of the same players that had played the original World Cup match played again. The match was drawn 2–2, with goals from Lázár Szentes and Ferenc Csongrádi for Hungary and two goals from Luis Ramírez Zapata for El Salvador.

At the 2009 UNCAF Nations Cup in Honduras, El Salvador finished second in their group after Belize 4–1, drawing 1–1 with Nicaragua and losing 2–0 to Honduras, and Nicaragua. Their semi-final against Costa Rica was called off after 60 minutes, with Costa Rica leading 1–0, when El Salvador were reduced to six players. Alexander Escobar and Eliseo Quintanilla were sent off in the first half, while Deris Umanzor, Rodolfo Zelaya and their goalkeeper Juan José Gómez were injured and had to leave the field after El Salvador had already used their three substitutions. The game was awarded as a 3–0 win to Costa Rica. In the third place play-off, they lost 1–0 to Honduras after a goal by Roger Espinoza. At the 2009 CONCACAF Gold Cup, El Salvador began by beating Costa Rica 2–1, with two goals by Osael Romero. However, they lost 1–0 against Canada and Jamaica and were eliminated.

=== 2010s ===
In 2010 World Cup qualification El Salvador beat Anguilla 16–0 on aggregate and Panama 3–2 on aggregate in the first two rounds. In their third round group, they finished second in the group behind Costa Rica, ahead of Haiti and Suriname, to advance to the Hexagonal round. Despite drawing against the United States and beating Mexico, El Salvador finished in fifth place and were eliminated. Rudis Corrales was their top scorer in qualification with 8 goals.

On 11 May 2010, the FIFA Emergency Committee suspended the Salvadoran Football Federation (FESFUT) on account of government interference, as the statutes ratified by the FESFUT general assembly in August 2009 had not been entered in the country's official register, and that the government had failed to acknowledge the authority of the Normalisation Committee set up to represent FESFUT. The suspension was lifted by 28 May, allowing La Selecta to participate in international tournaments. El Salvador's under-21 team qualified for the 2010 Central American and Caribbean Games (CAC) in Mayagüez, Puerto Rico. However, CONCACAF decided to suspend football at the 2010 CAC shortly after. El Salvador were also able to participate in the qualifying tournament for the 2012 Summer Olympics.

In the 2011 Copa Centroamericana, the new version of the reorganized UNCAF Nations Cup, El Salvador qualified from their first-round group in second place after defeating Nicaragua 2–0 and Belize 5–2, and losing 2–0 against Panama. In the semi-finals they lost 2–0 to Honduras, and lost 5–4 in a penalty shootout to Panama, after a 0–0 draw. This performance qualified El Salvador for the 2011 CONCACAF Gold Cup. The team was coached by José Luis Rugamas. Forward Rafael Burgos jointly received the Golden Boot with Costa Rica's Marco Ureña, with three goals.

In April 2011, two months before the start of the Gold Cup, José Luis Rugamas was replaced as coach by Rubén Israel. At the Gold Cup, El Salvador began with a 5–0 defeat to Mexico. They drew 1–1 with Costa Rica, with Rodolfo Zelaya's 25-yard free-kick opener being equalised by a Costa Rican goal in injury time, and beat Cuba 6–1 to reach the knockout stage for the first time since 2003. In the quarter-finals they drew 1–1 with Panama, with Panama scoring a controversial equaliser through Luis Tejada one minute from the end. Their coach Israel called the decision an "error of haste." Panama won the penalty shoot-out 5–3.

In 2014 World Cup qualification, El Salvador received a bye to the second round, where they began with a 3–2 win against the Dominican Republic, with goals scored by Rodolfo Zelaya (2) and Cristián Bautista. They then beat the Cayman Islands 4–1 with goals from Bautista, Luis Anaya (2) and Xavier García before winning the return against the Dominican Republic 2–1. They beat the Cayman Islands 4–0 at home, with goals by Víctor Turcios, Steve Purdy, Jaime Alas and Herbert Sosa. The last of these was the thousandth goal scored by the national team. Two comfortable wins over Suriname gave them a perfect record of six wins in six matches.

In the next round, El Salvador snatched a draw against Costa Rica in San José after being 2–0 down, but a home defeat against Mexico four days later precipitated the departure of Israel, whose poor relations with Jaime Rodríguez, the president of the National Institute of Sport Salvador (INDES) were widely known. The Salvadoran Football Association (FESFUT) named the Mexican Juan de Dios Castillo as his replacement.

Despite a good start, a 1–0 win in a friendly match against Guatemala, a 2–2 draw at the Estadio Cuscatlán in a qualifier against modest Guyana earned him the wrath of the public. A 3–2 victory in Georgetown, with a penalty saved by El Salvador's goalkeeper Dagoberto Portillo in additional time, kept their qualifying hopes alive, but these were ended by a 1–0 home defeat against Costa Rica. Juan de Dios Castillo was sacked in November 2012 and replaced on 17 December by the Peruvian Agustín Castillo, a five-time national champion with C.D. FAS.

El Salvador finished third in the 2013 Copa Centroamericana, allowing them to qualify for the 2013 CONCACAF Gold Cup in the United States. In that tournament, a 1–0 win over Haiti allowed them to qualify from the group stages in third place, but they lost 5–1 to the host nation in the quarter-finals.

In 2018 World Cup qualification, El Salvador won knockout ties against Saint Kitts and Nevis and Curaçao to reach the fourth round group stage, but they finished bottom of a group containing Mexico, Honduras and Canada with two draws and four defeats from their six matches.

=== 2020s ===
After COVID-19 restrictions had loosened up a bit, El Salvador organized a friendly match against the US in December 2020 to start things off again. However, they lost 6–0 to the CONCACAF giants. 2022 FIFA World Cup qualification were soon on the horizon and El Salvador had to play against Grenada and Montserrat in the March 2021 calendar. El Salvador won at home against Grenada in a 2–0 victory and tied with Montserrat in a grueling 1–1 match. This was when El Salvador needed a change fast and they soon sacked Carlos de los Cobos. They hired a Hugo Pérez as their new coach, who was also coaching the El Salvador Sub-23s in the Olympic Qualifiers in the same year. Hugo Perez made radical changes to the team and called up more newer players to help represent El Salvador. When June rolled by, El Salvador's next opponents were the US Virgin Islands and Antigua & Barbuda. El Salvador crushed the Virgin Islands with a 7–0 victory away and won again at home against Antigua in a 3–0 win; El Salvador were on their way to the second round of qualifications. El Salvador then faced off against Saint Kitts & Nevis in a round robin format. El Salvador managed to pull off a 0–4 victory away and a 2–0 victory at home, which got them to the final round of qualifications for the first time in over 10 years. In preparation for the upcoming 2021 CONCACAF Gold Cup, El Salvador organized three friendlies. On June 26, El Salvador played against Guatemala to a 0–0 standstill. However, Hugo Perez was trying to experiment with more younger and less or known players at the time to form an underwhelming B Team. El Salvador then flew to Croatia to face their next opponents. On July 2, La Selecta faced off against NK Istra 1961 to a 2–1 defeat. On July 4, El Salvador faced the Asian Cup winners, Qatar, to a 1–0 defeat.

On July 11, El Salvador played their first game in the 2021 CONCACAF Gold Cup against their Central American rivals, Guatemala, to a 2–0 victory. On July 14, El Salvador faced Trinidad & Tobago to another 2–0 victory to land El Salvador in the Quarter-Finals and gain 6 points for the first time in the Gold Cup. On July 18, El Salvador played their last game against Mexico to prove how much they've grown or not. El Salvador lost to Mexico in a tense 1–0 defeat. In the quarter-finals, El Salvador faced off against Qatar and lost once again in a 3–2 defeat, ending their Gold Cup run.

On September 19, 2023, FESFUT hired Spanish manager Rubén de la Barrera to coach to the El Salvador national team.

Barrera would leave after 3 months and David Dóniga would take over on January 2, 2024.

It was announced to the public that a friendly bout was arranged by Inter Miami CF (where Lionel Messi was playing at the time) to face off against El Salvador on 19 January 2024 in Estadio Cuscatlán, where the match ended in a 0–0 stalemate. From the period of friendlies in February to March, El Salvador faced Costa Rica to a 2–0 defeat in San Jose, then faced Bonaire to a highly scrutinized 1–1 result in Washington DC, then took on world champions Argentina to a 3–0 defeat, and eventually ended with a match against Honduras in a vigorous 1–1 draw. On June 6, 2026 World cup qualifiers commenced in the CONCACAF region as El Salvador faced Puerto Rico to an excruciating draw of 0–0. However, on June 9, El Salvador took on Saint Vincent and The Grenadines away and ended up claiming the victory in a 1–3 result. It was a significant breakthrough as El Salvador has never won a match since 2022 against Grenada. After 2 friendly matches against Peru (0–1 loss June 14) and Guatemala (0–1 win July 27), El Salvador prepared themselves for the upcoming CONCACAF Nations League in a duration of 3 months. In the month of September, El Salvador defeated Montserrat (1–4) and Bonaire (2–1). In October, El Salvador faced off against Saint Vincent and The Grenadines twice, each sharing wins (2–3 win and 1–2 loss). In November, El Salvador concluded their campaign by defeating Bonaire and Montserrat; all in a 1–0 verdict and topping their group to ascend to Nations League A after relegation. The team and David Dóniga were heavily criticized during this period for mediocre performances. On February 24, 2025, David Doniga would end up relinquishing his position as head coach for the national team.

On February 25, 2025, INDES and FESFUT would officially proclaim Hernán Darío Gómez to be the new incumbent head coach of the national team.

From March to May, El Salvador played 3 exhibition fixtures where they faced Houston Dynamo(2–1 loss), Pachuca(1–1 draw), and Guatemala(1–1 draw). On June 7 and 10, El Salvador concluded their 2nd round of qualifiers against Anguilla and Suriname. El Salvador defeated Anguilla 0–3 and measured up to a highly contested 1–1 draw against Suriname at home and advance to the final round of qualifying.

In the same month, El Salvador would go on to have one of their worst Gold Cup performances since 1998. Only able to claim one point from Curaçao in a 0–0 draw, failing to score a single goal, and finishing their tenure with 2 losses against Honduras and Canada, which would drop them into last place in their group.

El Salvador would participate in the final round of world cup qualifiers from September to November 2025. From the period time that was given to them, El Salvador managed to defeat Guatemala away in their first fixture. However, El Salvador failed to secure any meaningful results afterwards; losing the rest of their 5 games (home and away) to Suriname, Panama, and Guatemala. El Salvador concluded their campaign with only three points and finishing last in their group.

=== Match fixing ===
The national team has had accusations of several players losing matches on purpose in exchange for monetary rewards. Some of these allegations involved games against Venezuela, Mexico, USA, and Costa Rica. Fourteen players were handed lifetime bans from football on 20 September 2013: Luis Anaya, Osael Romero, Ramón Sánchez, Christian Castillo, Miguel Granadino, Miguel Montes, Dagoberto Portillo, Dennis Alas, Darwin Bonilla, Ramón Flores, Alfredo Pacheco, José Mardoqueo Henríquez, Marvin González, and Reynaldo Hernández. Carlos Monteagudo received a ban of 18 months. Eliseo Quintanilla and Víctor Turcios received six-month bans. Alexander Escobar, Christian Sánchez, and under-20 goalkeeper Yimmy Cuellar received bans of 30 days. After a further 20-day investigation, Rodrigo Martínez was sentenced to a ban of five years, Rodolfo Zelaya to a ban of one year, and Benji Villalobos to a ban of six months.

On 6 September 2016, the team revealed that they had turned down an offer to ensure that their result against Canada saw Honduras progress to the next round of World Cup qualification. Their coach Ramon Maradiaga was later fined 20,000 Swiss francs and banned from football for two years for not disclosing the approach.

== Stadium ==
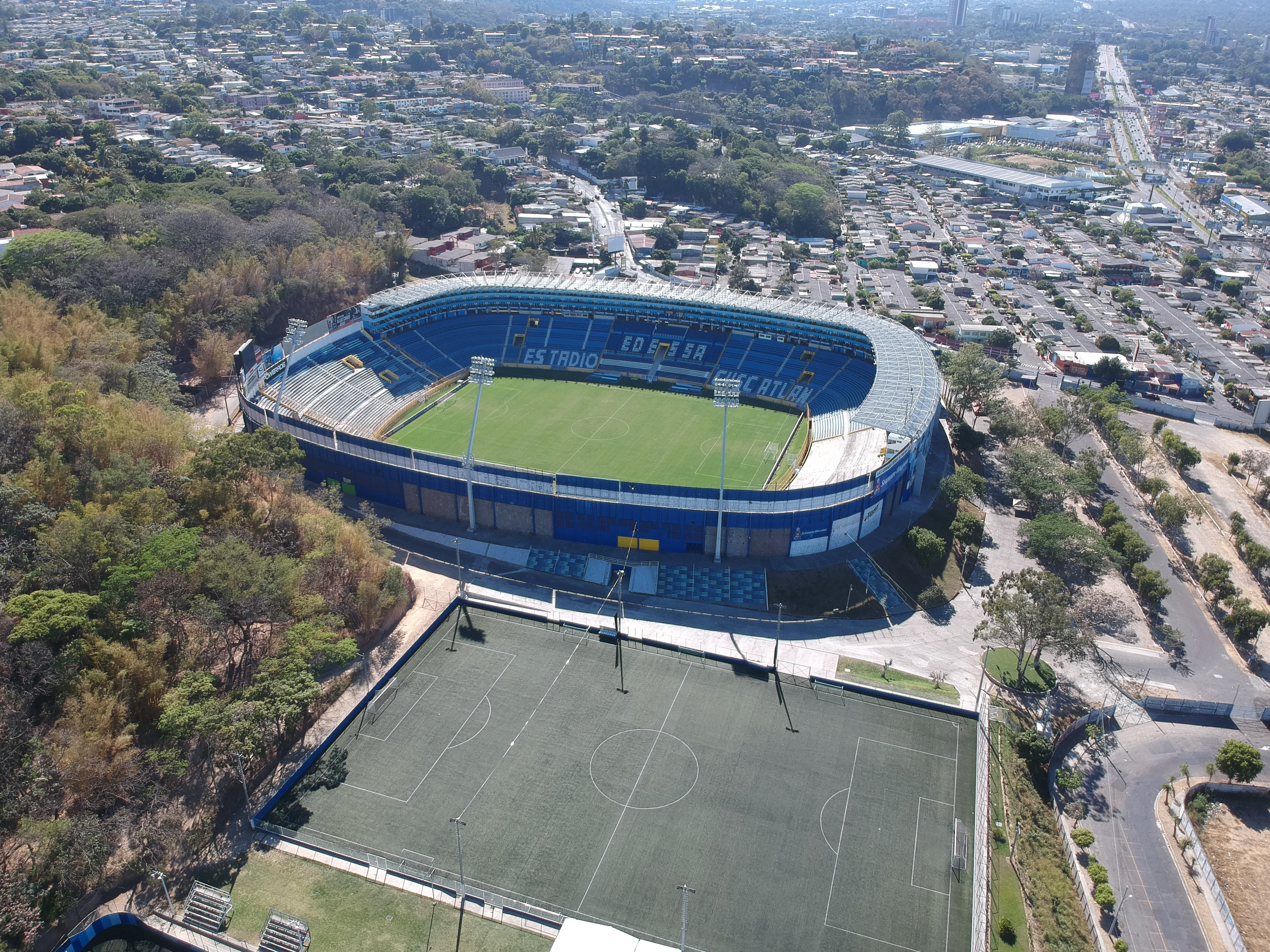
Aerial view of the Estadio Cuscatlán, El Salvador's national stadium

El Salvador's national stadium is the Estadio Cuscatlán in San Salvador, which saw its first game in 1976.

During the national team's early history, the national stadium was the Campo Marte, 16 acres of land that housed a small stadium, now known as Parque Infantil, between 1928 and 1934. Succeeding, El Salvador played at the Estadio Nacional de la Flor Blanca, now known as Estadio Jorge "Mágico" González, also in San Salvador. It was opened on 19 April 1932 during the presidency of Maximiliano Hernández Martínez in preparation for the 1935 Central American and Caribbean Games. On 24 March 1935 El Salvador played its first game at the Flor Blanca against Cuba and won 4–1. El Salvador played at this stadium during qualification for the 1970 World Cup. On 15 November 2000, a one-off game was played at the stadium, to commemorate a major refurbishment, against Jamaica in the 2002 World Cup qualifiers.

In 1969, EDESSA (Estadios Deportivos de El Salvador Sociedad Anónima) proposed the idea of a new national stadium. This resulted in construction of the Estadio Cuscatlán, with the president of El Salvador, General Fidel Sánchez Hernández, breaking ground on 24 March 1971. The stadium held its first game on 24 July 1976, a friendly between El Salvador and the German Bundesliga champions, Borussia Mönchengladbach. It ended in a 2–0 victory to the German side. The Borussia squad featured players from their 1974 World Cup winning squad, including Berti Vogts, Rainer Bonhof, Wolfgang Kleff and Jupp Heynckes, alongside Allan Simonsen, who later won the 1977 Ballon d'Or and joined Barcelona. El Salvador's team was Tomás Pineda (Mauricio "Tarzán" Alvarenga), Guillermo "Billy" Rodríguez Bou, Ramón Fagoaga, Humberto "Imacasa" Recinos, Eduardo "Conejo" Valdés, Víctor "Pato" Valencia, Warner Solís, Félix "Garrobita" Pineda (César "Piscucha" Acevedo), Luis "Pelé" Ramírez Zapata (Abraham Coreas) & Ismael "Cisco" Díaz (David Cabrera). Borussia also fielded Wolfgang Kneib, Hans-Jürgen Wittkamp, Horst Wohlers, Dietmar Danner, Hans Klinkhammer, Carsten Nielsen and Uli Stielike. Since that match, El Salvador has used the stadium for almost every major home game, and it is also the home ground of Alianza. On 25 May 1978, EDESSA agreed to sign a 99-year lease of the stadium to CLIMA (Asociación de Clubes de Liga Mayor A) to operate and control which events are held there.

== Team image ==
El Salvador's traditional first kit colour is blue with white trim, their second kit being white with blue trim. The current home and away kit features the traditional colours with the exception of bold curved trims that run from the center of the neck and open to the sides, forming two panels on the chest that contain the Umbro logo and emblem of the Salvadoran Football Federation. At the center of the kit El Salvador national emblem, once again, is shown. The right sleeve shows the national flag.

El Salvador and Mitre announced a new partnership in 2008 that saw them supply the Central American national football team with home and away kits, training, and bench wear until August 2010. Mitre, and their Panamanian partner, The Harari Group, designed the kit that El Salvador used. The kit was showcased by the team on February 11, 2009, as they started their FIFA World Cup qualifying campaign against Trinidad & Tobago in the CONCACAF (Central-American Football Union) Hexagonal Cup.

On 22 October 2010, the FESFUT extended the contract with Mitre by four years. The first home and away kit made by Mitre feature a watermark of the country's national shield on the center of the shirt and some horizontal stripes along the kit. The current kit featured white remains along the neck, at the bottom of the kit, and over the shoulders. When this kit was introduced in 2009 it also introduced a new logo that replaced the typical logo of an "E" and an "S" surrounded by a circle. Umbro has become the new kit supplier of the El Salvador national football team. Replacing Mitre, the first Umbro El Salvador football kits were released 15 June 2017, and were debuted in the 2017 Gold Cup.

=== Kit sponsorship ===
Kit supplier	Period
(United States) Pony	1980–1982
(West Germany) Adidas	1982–1987
(United States) Pony	1988–1992
(El Salvador) Galaxia	1992
(United States) Score	1992–1995
(United States) Reebok	1996
(Italy) Lanzera	1996–1998
(Italy) Kappa	1999–2000
(Spain) Joma	2001–2002
(El Salvador) Galaxia	2003
(Mexico) Atletica	2004–2007
(El Salvador) Milán	2007
(Mexico) Atletica	2007–2009
(United Kingdom) Mitre	2009–2017
(United Kingdom) Umbro	2017–present

== Results and fixtures ==
The following is a list of match results in the last 12 months, as well as any future matches that have been scheduled.

Win Draw Loss Fixture

=== 2026 ===
26 March 2025–26 CONCACAF Series	Dominican Republic	2–2	El Salvador	Santiago, Dominican Republic
20:00 UTC−4	Firpo 15'; Romero 90+4'	Report	Ordaz 62', 78'	Stadium: Estadio Cibao FC; Referee: Oliver Vergara (Panama)

29 March 2025–26 CONCACAF Series	Martinique	0–1	El Salvador	Santiago, Dominican Republic
16:00 UTC−4		Report	M. Gil 90+2'	Stadium: Estadio Cibao; Referee: Jefferson Escobar (Honduras)

3 June Friendly	South Korea	1–0	El Salvador	Provo, United States
19:00 UTC−6	Lee Dong-gyeong 57'	Report		Stadium: South Field; Referee: Natalie Simon (United States)

6 June Friendly	El Salvador	0–0	Qatar	Los Angeles, United States
13:00 UTC−7		Report		Stadium: BMO Stadium; Referee: Rubiel Vazquez (United States)

25 September 2026–27 Nations League	El Salvador	3–1	Martinique	San Salvador, El Salvador
21:00 UTC−6	Gil 8', 18'; Osorio 29'	Report	Antiste 51' (pen.)	Stadium: Estadio Jorge "El Mágico" González; Attendance: 6,095; Referee: Pierre-Luc Lauzière (Canada)

28 September 2026–27 Nations League	Guatemala	6–0	El Salvador	Guatemala City, Guatemala
20:00 UTC−6	Lom 8'; Rubín 28'; Fajardo 32', 89', 90+2'; Aparicio 56'	Report		Stadium: Estadio Manuel Felipe Carrera; Attendance: 4,826; Referee: Luis Enrique Santander (Mexico)

2 October 2026–27 Nations League	El Salvador	0–2	Jamaica	San Salvador, El Salvador
20:00 UTC−6		Report	East 39', 64'	Stadium: Estadio Cuscatlán; Attendance: 9,306; Referee: Adonai Escobedo (Mexico)

5 October 2026–27 Nations League	Martinique	1–1	El Salvador	Fort-de-France, Martinique
18:00 UTC−4	Antiste 56'	Report	Valladares 3'	Stadium: Stade Pierre-Aliker; Referee: Tori Penso (United States)

13 November 2026–27 Nations League Play-in	Saint Martin	0–2	El Salvador	Basseterre, Saint Kitts and Nevis
19:00 UTC−4		Report	Gil 34'; Cerritos 83'	Stadium: SKNFA Technical Center; Referee: Katia García (Mexico)

17 November 2026–27 Nations League Play-in	El Salvador	3–1 (5–1 agg.)	Saint Martin	San Salvador, El Salvador
19:00 UTC−6	Osorio 45'; Gil 46', 83'	Report	Dumas 45+3'	Stadium: Estadio Jorge "El Mágico" González; Referee: Armando Villarreal (United States)
Note: El Salvador won 5–1 on aggregate and qualified for the 2027 Gold Cup qualification.

== Coaching staff ==
As of February 2025

Position	Staff
Head coach	(Colombia) Hernán Darío Gómez
Assistant coach	(Colombia) Édgar Carvajal
Assistant coach	(El Salvador) Juan Carlos Serrano
Fitness coach	(Colombia) Mauricio Roldán
Goalkeeping coach	(El Salvador) Álvaro Misael Alfaro
Director of football	Vacant
Coordinator of football	(El Salvador) Juan Carlos Serrano

=== Coaching history ===
Since the creation of the national team in 1921, several coaches have been in charge of managing El Salvador. From 1930 to 1935, Mark Scott Thompson was appointed as El Salvador's first ever manager. As of January 2012, the El Salvador national football team has presented itself with 60 managers in the national team. It is reported that all 3 titles (1943, 1954 and 2002) have been won by Salvadoran born managers. Conrado Miranda has managed in 4 different occasions and Armando Contreras Palma in 3. Chilean Hernán Vivanco was manager when El Salvador competed at their first World Cup. Mauricio Rodríguez managed to qualify El Salvador to another World Cup. Rodríguez participated at the 1970 FIFA World Cup.

- (United States) Mark Scott Thompson (1930–1935)
- (Spain) Pablo Ferré Elías (1935–1938)
- (Chile) (Hungary) Máximo Garay (1940–1941)
- (England) Charlie Slade (1941–1943)
- (El Salvador) Américo González (1943–1948)
- (Argentina) Rodolfo Orlandini (1949–1951)
- (El Salvador) Marcelo Estrada (1953)
- (El Salvador) Carbilio Tomasino (1954–1959)
- (El Salvador) Emilio Guardado (1959–1960)
- (El Salvador) Conrado Miranda (1961)
- (Uruguay) Luis Comitante (1963)
- (Chile) Hernán Carrasco Vivanco (1965–1967)
- (El Salvador) Rigoberto Guzmán (1968)
- (Argentina) Gregorio Bundio (1968–1970)
- (Chile) Hernán Carrasco Vivanco (1970)
- (El Salvador) Conrado Miranda (1971)
- (Argentina) Héctor D'Angelo (1972)
- (Brazil) Jorge Tupinambá (1973)
- (El Salvador) Mauricio Rodríguez (1973–1974)
- (El Salvador) Conrado Miranda (1975)
- (El Salvador) Marcelo Estrada (1975–1976)
- (El Salvador) Raúl Magaña (1976)
- (Brazil) Pinto Beltrao (1976)
- (Uruguay) Juan Ricardo Faccio (1977)
- (El Salvador) Julio Contreras (1977)
- (El Salvador) Ricardo Tomasino (1978)
- (El Salvador) Raúl Magaña (1979)
- (El Salvador) Salvador Mariona (1979)
- (El Salvador) Mauricio Rodríguez (1979–1982)
- (El Salvador) Armando Palma (1983)
- (El Salvador) Raúl Magaña (1984)
- (Argentina) Juan Quarterone (1984–1985)
- (El Salvador) Paulo Roberto Cabrera (1986)
- (El Salvador) Raúl Magaña (1987)
- (Socialist Federal Republic of Yugoslavia) Milovan Đorić (1988)
- (Socialist Federal Republic of Yugoslavia) Miroslav Vukašinović (1988–1989)
- (El Salvador) Conrado Miranda (1989)
- (Socialist Federal Republic of Yugoslavia) Kiril Dojčinovski (1989)
- (El Salvador) Óscar Benítez (1991)
- (Uruguay) Jorge Aude (1991)
- (Uruguay) Aníbal Ruiz (1992)
- (Brazil) Jorge Vieira (1993)
- (Chile) Néstor Matamala (1993)
- (El Salvador) Ricardo Tenorio (1993)
- (North Macedonia) Kiril Dojčinovski (1994)
- (Argentina) José Pastoriza (1995–1996)
- (El Salvador) Armando Palma (1996)
- (Serbia) Milovan Đorić (1997)
- (North Macedonia) Kiril Dojčinovski (1998)
- (Chile) Julio Escobar (1998)
- (Brazil) Marinho Peres (1999)
- (El Salvador) Ricardo Tenorio (1999)
- (El Salvador) Óscar Benítez (1999–2000)
- (El Salvador) Carlos Recinos (2000–2002)
- (El Salvador) Juan Ramón Paredes (2002–2004)
- (El Salvador) Armando Palma (2004)
- (Argentina) Carlos Cavagnaro (2005)
- (El Salvador) Miguel Aguilar (2005–2006)
- (Mexico) Carlos de los Cobos (2006–2009)
- (El Salvador) José Luis Rugamas (2010–2011)
- (Uruguay) Rubén Israel (2011–2012)
- (Mexico) Juan de Dios Castillo (2012)
- (Peru) Agustín Castillo (2012–2013)
- (El Salvador) Mauricio Alfaro (2014)
- (Spain) Albert Roca (2014–2015)
- (El Salvador) Jorge Rodríguez (2015)
- (Honduras) Ramón Maradiaga (2015–2016)
- (Colombia) Eduardo Lara (2016–2017)
- (Mexico) Carlos de los Cobos (2018–2021)
- (United States) (El Salvador) Hugo Pérez (2021–2023)
- (Spain) Rubén de la Barrera (2023)
- (Spain) David Dóniga (2024–2025)
- (Colombia) Hernán Darío Gómez (2025–present)

== Players ==
=== Current squad ===
The following players were called up for the 2026–27 CONCACAF Nations League Play-in against Saint Martin on 13 and 17 November 2026.
Caps and goals as of 17 November 2026, after the match against Saint Martin.

No.	Pos.	Player	Date of birth (age)	Caps	Goals	Club
1	GK	Mario González (captain)	20 May 1997 (age 29)	63	0	(Salvadoran Football Federation) Alianza
18	GK	Geonathan Barrera	18 November 2004 (age 22)	0	0	(Salvadoran Football Federation) Luis Ángel Firpo
22	GK	Benji Villalobos	18 July 1988 (age 38)	19	0	(Salvadoran Football Federation) Águila
2	DF	Julio Sibrián	17 July 1996 (age 30)	35	0	(Salvadoran Football Federation) Alianza
3	DF	Danis Cerros	12 May 1999 (age 27)	5	0	(Salvadoran Football Federation) Municipal Limeño
4	DF	Jorge Cruz	24 January 2000 (age 26)	29	0	(Salvadoran Football Federation) FAS
5	DF	Rudy Clavel	10 October 1996 (age 30)	25	1	(Salvadoran Football Federation) FAS
15	DF	Jefferson Valladares	8 December 2002 (age 23)	20	1	(Salvadoran Football Federation) Municipal Limeño
16	DF	Diego Flores	1 July 2001 (age 25)	20	1	(Salvadoran Football Federation) Luis Ángel Firpo
19	DF	Nelson Blanco	17 August 1999 (age 27)	20	0	(United States Soccer Federation) San Antonio
23	DF	Diego Ortez	30 September 2003 (age 23)	0	0	(Salvadoran Football Federation) Luis Ángel Firpo
	DF	Elvis Claros	31 August 2000 (age 26)	3	0	(Salvadoran Football Federation) Municipal Limeño
6	MF	Joshua Pérez	21 January 1998 (age 28)	29	3	(Polish Football Association) Odra Opole
8	MF	Amando Moreno	10 September 1995 (age 31)	17	0	(United States Soccer Federation) El Paso Locomotive
10	MF	Harold Osorio	20 August 2003 (age 23)	20	3	(Salvadoran Football Federation) Alianza
12	MF	Marcelo Díaz	19 December 2000 (age 25)	16	0	(Salvadoran Football Federation) Águila
13	MF	Eric Calvillo	2 January 1998 (age 28)	10	0	(United States Soccer Federation) El Paso Locomotive
14	MF	Christian Martínez	12 August 1994 (age 32)	49	0	(Costa Rican Football Federation) San Carlos
20	MF	Mauricio Cerritos	17 October 2003 (age 23)	19	1	(Salvadoran Football Federation) Luis Ángel Firpo
	MF	José Portillo	14 November 1999 (age 27)	2	0	(Salvadoran Football Federation) FAS
7	FW	Styven Vásquez	29 October 2002 (age 24)	27	3	(Salvadoran Football Federation) Luis Ángel Firpo
9	FW	Brayan Gil	28 June 2001 (age 25)	28	10	(Russian Football Union) Baltika Kaliningrad
11	FW	Rafael Tejada	12 March 2003 (age 23)	19	2	(Salvadoran Football Federation) FAS
17	FW	Jairo Henríquez	31 August 1993 (age 33)	66	5	(Salvadoran Football Federation) Inter Santa Tecla
21	FW	Jorge Méndez	6 April 2001 (age 25)	1	0	(Panamanian Football Federation) San Francisco

=== Recent call-ups ===
The following players have been called up within the last 12 months.

Pos.	Player	Date of birth (age)	Caps	Goals	Club	Latest call-up
GK	Kevin Carabantes	6 February 1993 (age 33)	7	0	(El Salvador) FAS	v. Martinique, 5 October 2026
GK	Daniel Franco	10 October 2006 (age 20)	0	0	(El Salvador) Alianza	Training camp 24 September 2026
GK	Sergio Sibrián	8 July 2004 (age 22)	0	0	(El Salvador) Inter Santa Tecla	v. The Dreams, 28 April 2026
DF	Henry Romero	17 October 1991 (age 35)	30	1	(El Salvador) Alianza	v. Martinique, 5 October 2026
DF	Alejandro Henríquez	28 August 2002 (age 24)	7	0	(El Salvador) Alianza	v. Martinique, 5 October 2026
DF	Alejandro Cano	21 May 2004 (age 22)	1	0	(United States) San Jose Earthquakes II	v. Club Tijuana, 10 July 2026
DF	Lizandro Claros	25 January 1998 (age 28)	4	0	(El Salvador) Luis Ángel Firpo	v. Martinique, 29 March 2026
DF	Ronald Rodríguez	22 September 1998 (age 28)	34	0	(El Salvador) Águila	Training camp 26–28 January 2026
MF	Víctor García	15 June 1995 (age 31)	3	0	(El Salvador) Luis Ángel Firpo	v. Martinique, 5 October 2026
MF	Mayer Gil	7 September 2003 (age 23)	21	2	(Colombia) Deportivo Pasto	v. Martinique, 5 October 2026
MF	Noel Rivera	18 June 2004 (age 22)	4	0	(El Salvador) Alianza	v. Martinique, 25 September 2026
MF	Bryan Landaverde	27 May 1995 (age 31)	38	1	(El Salvador) Luis Ángel Firpo	v. Club Tijuana, 10 July 2026
MF	Kevin Reyes	28 August 1999 (age 27)	22	0	(El Salvador) Isidro Metapán	v. Club Tijuana, 10 July 2026
MF	Isaac Portillo	8 November 1994 (age 32)	19	0	(El Salvador) Inter Santa Tecla	v. Club Tijuana, 10 July 2026
MF	Leonardo Menjívar	24 October 2001 (age 25)	16	0	(El Salvador) Alianza	v. Club Tijuana, 10 July 2026
MF	Stiven Menjívar	1 January 2007 (age 19)	0	0	(El Salvador) Talleres Jr	Training camp 18–29 May 2026
MF	Jefferson Amaya	14 June 2003 (age 23)	0	0	(United States) Charlotte Independence	Training camp 18–29 May 2026
MF	Gabriel Arnold	1 February 2007 (age 19)	0	0	(United States) Ventura County	v. The Dreams, 28 April 2026
MF	Nelson Díaz	4 July 2006 (age 20)	0	0	(El Salvador) Luis Ángel Firpo	v. The Dreams, 28 April 2026
MF	Steven Guerra	12 March 2005 (age 21)	4	0	(El Salvador) Isidro Metapán	Training camp 26–28 January 2026
MF	Johann Ortíz	1 January 2007 (age 19)	0	0	(United States) Sporting Kansas City II	Training camp 26–28 January 2026
FW	Cristian Gil	5 November 1996 (age 30)	22	3	(El Salvador) Luis Ángel Firpo	v. Martinique, 5 October 2026
FW	Nathan Ordaz	12 January 2004 (age 22)	15	2	(United States) D.C. United	v. Martinique, 5 October 2026
FW	Emerson Mauricio	27 August 2002 (age 24)	13	2	(El Salvador) Inter Santa Tecla	v. Club Tijuana, 10 July 2026
FW	Francis Castillo	7 November 2005 (age 21)	6	1	(El Salvador) Alianza	Training camp 26–28 January 2026
FW	Juan Carlos Argueta	18 May 2000 (age 26)	1	0	(El Salvador) Municipal Limeño	Training camp 26–28 January 2026
^{INJ} Player withdrew from the current squad due to injury.^{COV} Player withdrew due to testing positively for COVID-19 or having to self-isolate because of it.^{PRE} Preliminary squad.^{RET} Player had announced retirement from international football.^{SUS} Player is serving a suspension.^{WD} Player withdrew for personal reasons.^{EXC} Excluded from squad.^{SUS} Suspended.

== Player records ==
As of 29 March 2026
Players in bold are still active with El Salvador.

=== Most appearances ===
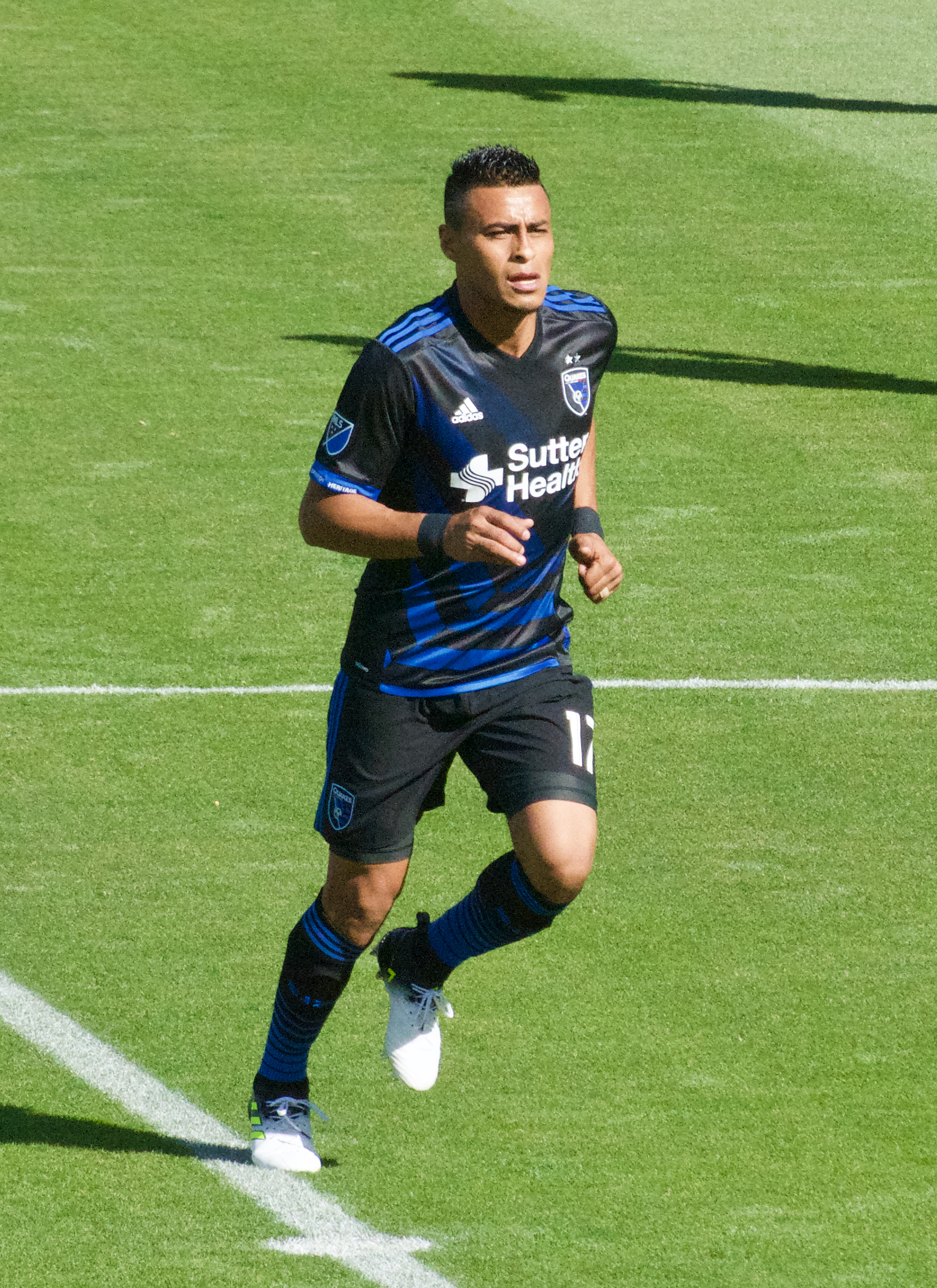
Darwin Cerén is El Salvador's most capped player with 108 appearances.

Rank	Player	Caps	Goals	Career
1	**Darwin Cerén**	108	5	2012–present
2	**Alexander Larín**	86	7	2012–present
2	**Bryan Tamacas**	86	3	2016–present
4	Alfredo Pacheco	85	7	2002–2013
5	Dennis Alas	83	3	2001–2012
6	Leonel Cárcamo	82	0	1988–2000
7	Marvin González	81	1	2002–2011
8	Rudis Corrales	78	17	1999–2011
8	Ramón Sánchez	78	2	2003–2012
10	Osael Romero	77	16	2007–2013

=== Top goalscorers ===
Rank	Player	Goals	Caps	Ratio	Career
1	Raúl Díaz Arce	39	72	0.54	1991–2000
2	Rodolfo Zelaya	23	53	0.43	2008–2019
3	Mágico González	21	62	0.34	1976–1998
4	**Nelson Bonilla**	20	65	0.31	2012–present
5	Juan Francisco Barraza	19	40	0.48	1953–1969
5	José María Rivas	19	47	0.4	1979–1989
7	Rudis Corrales	17	78	0.22	2001–2011
8	Luis Ramírez Zapata	16	58	0.28	1971–1989
8	Osael Romero	16	77	0.21	2007–2013
10	Miguel Cruz	15	14	1.07	1935–1950
10	Eliseo Quintanilla	15	68	0.22	2006–2012
10	Guillermo Rivera	15	76	0.2	1988–2000

== Competitive record ==
=== FIFA World Cup ===
FIFA World Cup record										Qualification record					
Year	Round	Position	Pld	W	D	L	GF	GA	Squad	Pld	W	D	L	GF	GA
(Uruguay) 1930	Not a FIFA member									Not a FIFA member					
(Italy) 1934	Not a FIFA member									Not a FIFA member					
(France) 1938	Did not participate									Did not participate					
(Brazil) 1950	Withdrew (Note: El Salvador turned down an invitation from Brazil.)									Withdrew					
(Switzerland) 1954	Did not participate									Did not participate					
(Sweden) 1958	Did not participate									Did not participate					
(Chile) 1962	Did not participate									Did not participate					
(England) 1966	Did not participate									Did not participate					
(Mexico) 1970	Group stage	16th	3	0	0	3	0	9	Squad	10	7	0	3	19	12
(West Germany) 1974	Did not qualify									2	0	0	2	0	2
(Argentina) 1978	Did not qualify									11	4	4	3	18	16
(Spain) 1982	Group stage	24th	3	0	0	3	1	13	Squad	13	7	4	2	14	6
(Mexico) 1986	Did not qualify									6	4	1	1	15	2
(Italy) 1990	Did not qualify									8	2	2	4	8	8
(United States) 1994	Did not qualify									14	8	1	5	28	18
(France) 1998	Did not qualify									16	5	5	6	23	22
(South Korea) (Japan) 2002	Did not qualify									10	6	1	3	23	15
(Germany) 2006	Did not qualify									8	2	2	4	6	14
(South Africa) 2010	Did not qualify									20	8	3	9	39	21
(Brazil) 2014	Did not qualify									12	7	2	3	28	16
(Russia) 2018	Did not qualify									10	3	3	4	12	16
(Qatar) 2022	Did not qualify									20	7	5	8	27	19
(Canada) (Mexico) (United States) 2026	Did not qualify									10	3	2	5	9	13
(Morocco) (Portugal) (Spain) 2030	To be determined									To be determined					
(Saudi Arabia) 2034	To be determined									To be determined					
Total	Group stage	2/21	6	0	0	6	1	22	—	170	73	35	62	269	200

FIFA World Cup history
First match	Belgium 3–0 El Salvador (3 June 1970; Mexico City, Mexico)
Biggest win	—
Biggest defeat	Hungary 10–1 El Salvador (15 June 1982; Elche, Spain)
Best result	Group stage (1970, 1986)
Worst result	—

=== CONCACAF Gold Cup ===
CONCACAF Championship / Gold Cup record										Qualification record					
Year	Round	Position	Pld	W	D	L	GF	GA	Squad	Pld	W	D	L	GF	GA
(El Salvador) 1963	Runners-up	2nd	7	3	3	1	17	11	—	Qualified as hosts					
(Guatemala) 1965	Fourth place	4th	5	2	1	2	7	9	—	2	2	0	0	7	1
(Honduras) 1967	Did not participate									Did not participate					
(Costa Rica) 1969	Banned									Banned					
(Trinidad and Tobago) 1971	Withdrew									Withdrew					
(Haiti) 1973	Did not qualify									2	0	0	2	0	2
(Mexico) 1977	Third place	3rd	5	2	1	2	8	9	—	6	2	3	1	10	7
(Honduras) 1981	Runners-up	2nd	5	2	2	1	2	1	—	8	5	2	1	12	5
1985	Fourth place	4th	4	2	1	1	7	2	—	2	2	0	0	8	0
1989	Round-robin	5th	6	0	2	4	2	8	—	2	2	0	0	6	0
(United States) 1991	Did not qualify									5	2	1	2	7	11
(Mexico) (United States) 1993	Did not qualify									3	0	1	2	1	5
(United States) 1996	Group stage	6th	2	1	0	1	3	4	Squad	4	3	0	1	7	3
(United States) 1998	Group stage	8th	3	0	1	2	0	6	Squad	5	1	1	3	2	5
(United States) 2000	Did not qualify									8	1	2	5	6	15
(United States) 2002	Quarter-finals	8th	3	1	0	2	1	5	Squad	6	2	4	0	8	4
(Mexico) (United States) 2003	Quarter-finals	6th	3	1	0	2	3	7	Squad	5	3	0	2	6	4
(United States) 2005	Did not qualify									2	0	0	2	1	3
(United States) 2007	Group stage	9th	3	1	0	2	2	6	Squad	5	2	1	2	4	5
(United States) 2009	Group stage	9th	3	1	0	2	2	3	Squad	5	1	1	3	5	8
(United States) 2011	Quarter-finals	7th	4	1	2	1	8	8	Squad	5	2	1	2	7	6
(United States) 2013	Quarter-finals	7th	4	1	1	2	4	8	Squad	4	1	2	1	2	2
(Canada) (United States) 2015	Group stage	9th	3	0	2	1	1	2	Squad	4	2	0	2	4	3
(United States) 2017	Quarter-finals	8th	4	1	1	2	4	6	Squad	5	2	1	2	5	4
(Costa Rica) (Jamaica) (United States) 2019	Group stage	9th	3	1	1	1	1	4	Squad	4	3	0	1	7	2
(United States) 2021	Quarter-finals	6th	4	2	0	2	6	4	Squad	6	5	0	1	10	1
(Canada) (United States) 2023	Group stage	14th	3	0	2	1	3	4	Squad	4	1	2	1	6	5
(Canada) (United States) 2025	Group stage	15th	3	0	1	2	0	4	Squad	6	5	0	1	12	6
2027	To be determined									To be determined					
Total	Runners-up	20/28	77	22	21	34	81	111	—	108	49	22	37	143	107

CONCACAF Championship & Gold Cup history
First match	El Salvador 1–1 Panama (23 March 1963; San Salvador, El Salvador)
Biggest win	El Salvador 6–1 Nicaragua (25 March 1963; San Salvador, El Salvador); El Salvador 6–1 Cuba (12 June 2011; Chicago, United States)
Biggest defeat	Mexico 5–0 El Salvador (5 June 2011; Arlington, United States)
Best result	Runners-up (1963, 1981)
Worst result	Group stage (1996, 1998, 2007, 2009, 2015, 2019, 2023, 2025)

=== CONCACAF Nations League ===
CONCACAF Nations League record
League phase										Finals								
Season	Division	Group	Pld	W	D	L	GF	GA	P/R	Year	Result	Pld	W	D	L	GF	GA	Squad
2019–20	B	B	6	5	0	1	10	1	▲	(United States) 2021	Ineligible							
2022–23	A	D	4	1	2	1	6	5	Same position	(United States) 2023	Did not qualify							
2023–24	A	A	4	0	1	3	2	6	▼	(United States) 2024	Did not qualify							
2024–25	B	A	6	5	0	1	12	6	▲	(United States) 2025	Ineligible							
2026–27	A	B	4	1	1	2	4	10	▼	(United States) 2027	Did not qualify							
Total	—	—	24	12	4	8	34	28	—	Total	0 Titles	—	—	—	—	—	—	—

CONCACAF Nations League history
First match	El Salvador 3–0 Saint Lucia (7 September 2019; San Salvador, El Salvador)
Biggest win	El Salvador 3–0 Saint Lucia (7 September 2019; San Salvador, El Salvador); Montserrat 1–4 El Salvador (5 September 2024; Rincon, Bonaire)
Biggest defeat	Guatemala 6–0 El Salvador (28 September 2026; Guatemala City, Guatemala)
Best result	—
Worst result	—

=== Copa Centroamericana ===
Copa Centroamericana record
Year	Round	Position	Pld	W	D	L	GF	GA
(Costa Rica) 1991	Fourth place	4th	3	0	1	2	2	9
(Honduras) 1993	Fourth place	4th	3	0	1	2	1	5
(El Salvador) 1995	Third place	3rd	4	2	0	2	5	5
(Guatemala) 1997	Third place	3rd	5	3	1	1	5	5
(Costa Rica) 1999	Fourth place	4th	5	1	1	3	3	9
(Honduras) 2001	Third place	3rd	6	2	4	0	8	4
(Panama) 2003	Third place	3rd	5	3	0	2	6	4
(Guatemala) 2005	Round 1	6th	2	0	0	2	1	3
(El Salvador) 2007	Fourth place	4th	5	2	1	2	4	5
(Honduras) 2009	Fourth place	4th	5	1	1	3	5	6
(Panama) 2011	Fourth place	4th	5	2	1	2	7	6
(Costa Rica) 2013	Third place	3rd	4	1	2	1	2	2
(United States) 2014	Fourth place	4th	4	2	0	2	4	3
(Panama) 2017	Third place	3rd	5	2	1	2	5	4
Total	Third place	14/14	57	19	14	24	54	67

=== CCCF Championship ===
CCCF Championship record
Year	Round	Position	Pld	W	D	L	GF	GA
(Costa Rica) 1941	Runners-up	2nd	4	2	1	1	15	8
(El Salvador) 1943	Champions	1st	6	4	1	1	28	11
(Costa Rica) 1946	Third place	3rd	5	3	0	2	15	11
(Guatemala) 1948	Fifth place	5th	8	2	1	5	6	17
(Panama) 1951	Did not enter							
(Costa Rica) 1953	Fifth place	5th	6	2	1	3	10	14
(Honduras) 1955	Fourth place	4th	6	3	0	3	8	13
(Netherlands Antilles) 1957	Did not enter							
(Cuba) 1960	Withdrew							
(Costa Rica) 1961	Runners-up	2nd	6	4	1	1	18	7
Total	1 Title	7/10	41	20	5	16	100	81

=== Olympic Games ===
Olympic Games record
Year	Round	Position	Pld	W	D	L	GF	GA	Squad
(France) 1900	Only club teams participated								
(United States) 1904	Only club teams participated								
(United Kingdom) 1908	No national representative								
(Sweden) 1912	No national representative								
(Belgium) 1920	No national representative								
(France) 1924	No national representative								
(Netherlands) 1928	No national representative								
(Nazi Germany) 1936	Not an IOC member								
(United Kingdom) 1948	Did not participate								
(Finland) 1952	Did not participate								
(Australia) 1956	Did not participate								
(Italy) 1960	Did not participate								
(Japan) 1964	Did not participate								
(Mexico) 1968	Group stage	15th	3	0	1	2	2	8	Squad
(West Germany) 1972	Did not participate								
(Canada) 1976	Did not participate								
(Soviet Union) 1980	Did not participate								
(United States) 1984	Did not participate								
(South Korea) 1988	Did not qualify								
Since 1992	See El Salvador national under-23 football team								
Total	Group stage	1/11	3	0	1	2	2	8	—

=== Pan American Games ===
Pan American Games record
Year	Round	Position	Pld	W	D	L	GF	GA
(Argentina) 1951	Did not qualify							
(Mexico) 1955	Did not qualify							
(United States) 1959	Did not qualify							
(Brazil) 1963	Did not qualify							
(Canada) 1967	Did not qualify							
(Colombia) 1971	Did not qualify							
(Mexico) 1975	Preliminary round	10th	3	1	1	1	4	3
(Puerto Rico) 1979	Did not qualify							
(Venezuela) 1983	Did not qualify							
(United States) 1987	Preliminary round	7th	3	1	1	1	1	1
(Cuba) 1991	Did not qualify							
(Argentina) 1995	Did not qualify							
Since 1999	See El Salvador national under-23 football team							
Total	Preliminary round	2/12	6	2	2	2	5	4

=== Central American and Caribbean Games ===
Central American and Caribbean Games record
Year	Round	Position	Pld	W	D	L	GF	GA
(Cuba) 1930	Fourth place	4th	5	1	0	4	13	25
(El Salvador) 1935	Bronze medal	3rd	5	2	0	3	15	20
(Panama) 1938	Fourth place	4th	5	2	0	3	7	19
(Colombia) 1946	Did not qualify							
(Guatemala) 1950	Fourth place	4th	3	1	0	2	4	5
(Mexico) 1954	Gold medal	1st	4	3	1	0	9	5
(Venezuela) 1959	Did not qualify							
(Jamaica) 1962	Did not qualify							
(Puerto Rico) 1966	Fourth place	4th	5	1	2	2	5	9
(Panama) 1970	Did not qualify							
(Dominican Republic) 1974	Did not qualify							
(Colombia) 1978	Group stage	9th	5	1	0	4	2	21
(Cuba) 1982	Did not qualify							
(Dominican Republic) 1986	Did not qualify							
Since 1990	Youth teams participated							
Total	1 Gold medal	7/14	32	11	3	18	55	83

== Head-to-head record ==
As of 17 November 2026.

Positive Record Neutral Record Negative Record

Opponents	Pld	W	D	L	GF	GA	GD
Anguilla	3	3	0	0	19	0	+19
Antigua and Barbuda	1	1	0	0	3	0	+3
Argentina	3	0	0	3	0	7	−7
Armenia	1	0	0	1	0	4	−4
Aruba	1	1	0	0	2	0	+2
Barbados	1	1	0	0	3	0	+3
Belgium	2	0	0	2	0	4	−4
Belize	9	9	0	0	26	6	+20
Bermuda	5	2	1	2	8	6	+2
Bolivia	5	1	2	2	6	9	−3
Bonaire	3	2	1	0	4	2	+2
Brazil	3	0	0	3	0	13	−13
Canada	18	4	4	10	13	24	−11
Cayman Islands	2	2	0	0	8	1	+7
Chile	3	0	0	3	0	3	−3
China	1	0	1	0	2	2	0
Colombia	8	1	2	5	9	18	−9
Costa Rica	60	9	13	38	50	130	−80
Cuba	9	7	2	0	24	4	+20
Curaçao (Note: Includes matches against the Netherlands Antilles.)	23	12	9	2	31	17	+14
Denmark	1	1	0	0	1	0	+1
Dominican Republic	5	3	1	1	9	6	+3
Ecuador	10	1	2	7	8	31	−23
Estonia	1	0	0	1	0	2	−2
Ghana	1	0	1	0	1	1	0
Greece	2	0	0	2	1	6	−5
Grenada	3	2	1	0	7	3	+4
Guatemala	90	23	27	40	75	110	−35
Guyana	2	1	1	0	5	4	+1
Haiti	27	15	6	6	36	18	+18
Honduras	78	18	21	39	76	126	−50
Hungary	4	0	1	3	3	17	−14
Iceland	1	0	0	1	0	1	−1
Israel	1	0	0	1	1	3	−2
Ivory Coast	1	0	0	1	1	2	−1
Jamaica	27	6	10	11	18	29	−11
Japan	2	0	0	2	0	8	−8
Martinique	7	3	2	2	7	5	+2
Mexico	37	4	1	32	20	106	−86
Moldova	1	1	0	0	2	0	+2
Montserrat	6	5	1	0	11	3	+8
New Zealand	1	0	1	0	2	2	0
Nicaragua	31	27	3	1	120	21	+99
Panama	45	14	11	20	58	64	−6
Paraguay	6	0	0	6	1	11	−10
Peru	7	2	0	5	6	15	−9
Puerto Rico	4	2	2	0	10	2	+8
Qatar	3	0	1	2	2	4	−2
Republic of Ireland	1	1	0	0	1	0	+1
Russia (Note: Includes matches against the Soviet Union.)	5	0	0	5	1	10	−9
Saint Kitts and Nevis	4	3	1	0	12	3	+9
Saint Lucia	2	2	0	0	5	0	+5
Saint Martin	2	2	0	0	5	1	+4
Saint Vincent and the Grenadines	5	4	0	1	16	7	+9
Serbia (Note: Includes matches against Yugoslavia.)	1	0	0	1	1	4	−3
South Korea	2	0	1	1	1	2	−1
Spain	1	0	0	1	0	2	−2
Suriname	12	8	1	3	30	14	+16
Trinidad and Tobago	13	4	4	5	16	17	−1
United States	28	1	7	20	16	63	−47
U.S. Virgin Islands	1	1	0	0	7	0	+7
Venezuela	5	2	0	3	6	7	−1
Zimbabwe	1	0	1	0	0	0	0
Total (63)	648	211	143	294	806	978	−172

== FIFA ranking history ==
The following is a chart of the yearly averages of El Salvador's FIFA ranking.

== Honours ==
=== Continental ===
- CONCACAF Championship
  - (silver) Runners-up (2): 1963, 1981
  - (bronze) Third place (1): 1977

=== Subcontinental / Regional ===
- CCCF Championship (Note: Competition organized by CCCF, the former subcontinental confederation affiliated with FIFA as the governing body for football in Central America and Caribbean (1938–1961), and a direct predecessor of CONCACAF.)
  - (gold) Champions (1): 1943
  - (silver) Runners-up (2): 1941, 1961
  - (bronze) Third place (1): 1946
- Copa de Naciones UNCAF / Copa Centroamericana
  - (bronze) Third place (6): 1995, 1997, 2001, 2003, 2013, 2017
- Central American and Caribbean Games
  - (gold) Gold medal (1): 1954
  - (bronze) Bronze medal (1): 1935

=== Summary ===
Honours in competitions directly organized or recognized by FIFA or an affiliated confederation.

Competition	1st place, gold medalist(s)	2nd place, silver medalist(s)	3rd place, bronze medalist(s)	Total
CONCACAF Championship	0	2	1	3
CCCF Championship	1	2	1	4
Total	1	4	2	7

== See also ==
- El Salvador national under-23 football team
- El Salvador national under-21 football team
- El Salvador national under-17 football team
- List of football clubs in El Salvador
- Primera División de El Salvador
