= Mark Scott Thompson =

American soccer coach

Mack Scott Thompson
Personal information
- Full name: Mack Scott Thompson
- Place of birth: United States

Managerial career
- Years: Team
- 1930–1935: El Salvador

Mack Scott Thompson was head coach of the El Salvador national team from 1930 until 1935. He was the first person to be given the job, making him the first and, for 91 years, the only American to coach El Salvador.
