= Ricardo López Tenorio =

Salvadoran football coach (born 1947)

Personal information
- Full name: Ricardo López Tenorio
- Date of birth: 24 January 1947 (age 79)
- Place of birth: Santa Ana, El Salvador

Youth career
- Years: Team
- 1964: Gatos de Monterre

Managerial career
- 1978–1980: C.D. Mario Calvo
- 1986: Once Lobos
- 1994: El Salvador
- 1999: El Salvador
- 1989–1990: Tiburones/C.D. Sonsonate
- 1993-1994: El Roble
- 1994-1995: Atletico Marte

Ricardo López Tenorio (born 24 January th, 1947 in Santa Ana) is a Salvadoran football coach. During his playing days, Tenorio was part of the Under 20 El Salvador team that won the 1964 under 20 NORCECA title .

== Personal life ==
He lives in Dallas managing his own Soccer School.
