= Rubén de la Barrera =

Spanish football manager (born 1985)

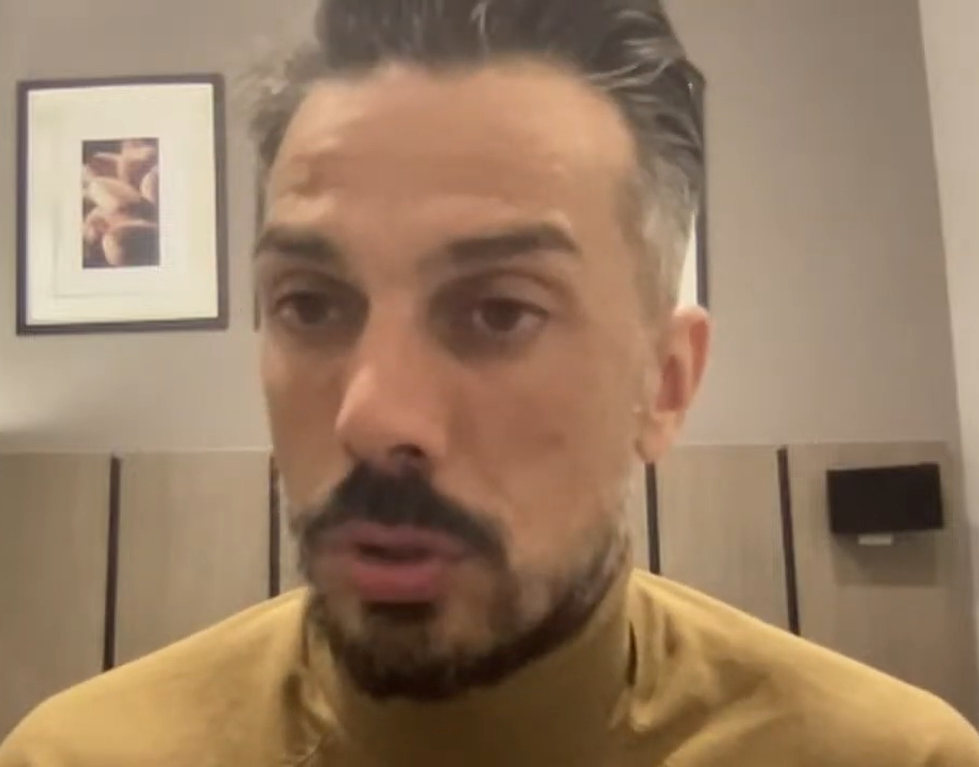
- De la Barrera in 2023

Personal information
- Full name: Rubén de la Barrera Fernández
- Date of birth: 18 January 1985 (age 41)
- Place of birth: A Coruña, Spain

Youth career
- Ural
- Orillamar

Senior career*
Years	Team	Apps	(Gls)
- Victoria

Managerial career
- 2004–2006: Ural (youth)
- 2006–2007: Arteixo (youth)
- 2007–2009: Montañeros (youth)
- 2010–2012: Villaralbo
- 2013–2014: Guijuelo
- 2014–2015: Valladolid B
- 2015–2016: Guijuelo
- 2016–2018: Cultural Leonesa
- 2018: Real Sociedad (assistant)
- 2018–2019: Al Ahli
- 2020: Viitorul Constanța
- 2021: Deportivo La Coruña
- 2021–2022: Albacete
- 2023: Deportivo La Coruña
- 2023: El Salvador
- 2023–2024: Vizela
- 2026: Cultural Leonesa
- 2026: Las Palmas
- * Club domestic league appearances and goals

Rubén Alfonso de la Barrera Fernández (born 18 January 1985) is a Spanish professional football manager.

== Managerial career ==
Born in A Coruña, Galicia, de la Barrera started his managerial career with Ural CF's youth categories in 2004, having previously represented the club, Victoria CF and Orillamar SD as a player. After being in charge of Atlético Arteixo and Montañeros CF's Juvenil squads, he was named manager of Tercera División side GCE Villaralbo on 27 May 2010.

De la Barrera took Villaralbo to two consecutive play-offs during his spell at the club, but still left in June 2012. After one full season without a club, he was appointed CD Guijuelo manager on 18 July 2013.

In his debut campaign in Segunda División B, de la Barrera again reached the play-offs, being knocked out by CD Leganés. On 30 June 2014, he was appointed at the helm of fellow third-tier club Real Valladolid B.

On 1 July 2015, de la Barrera returned to Guijuelo, but only finished the season in the sixth position. On 27 May of the following year he was appointed manager of Cultural y Deportiva Leonesa, achieving promotion to Segunda División as champions in his first campaign.

De la Barrera's first professional match occurred on 18 August 2017, a 2–0 away loss against Lorca FC. On 8 June of the following year, after suffering relegation in the last round, he was named Asier Garitano's assistant at Real Sociedad.

In December 2018, de la Barrera began his first job abroad, taking over on an 18-month contract at Al Ahli SC (Doha) who were 5th in the Qatar Stars League. Shortly before completing a year in the position, he left the 7th-placed club by mutual agreement.

On 7 August 2020, de la Barrera took over Romanian Liga I side FC Viitorul Constanța, but left on 30 November by agreement with his employer. The following 12 January, he replaced Fernando Vázquez at the helm of Deportivo de La Coruña, in his country's third division.

On 2 June 2021, de la Barrera was named manager of Albacete Balompié, freshly relegated to Primera División RFEF. He led the side back to the second level at first attempt, before leaving on a mutual agreement on 15 June 2022.

On 20 September 2023, de La Barrera was named as the head coach of the El Salvador national team. Three months later, he resigned, stating in a press conference that a first division club from an "important league" had contacted him and convinced him to join them.

On 19 December 2023, de la Barrera was appointed as manager of Portuguese Primeira Liga club Vizela, signing a contract until June 2025. He could not avoid relegation to Liga Portugal 2 and was sacked on 25 November 2024, with the team 9th in the second-tier.

On 24 February 2026, after more than a year without a club, de la Barrera returned to Cultu for a second time, being named in charge of the side now in the second division and sitting in the relegation zone. After failing to avoid relegation, the club announced his departure at the end of the campaign on 28 May.

On 22 June 2026, de la Barrera was announced as manager of UD Las Palmas also in division two, signing a one-year contract. On 12 October, after just nine matches, he was sacked.

== Managerial statistics ==
As of 11 October 2026

Managerial record by team and tenure
Team	Nat	From	To	Record								Ref
Team	Nat	From	To	G	W	D	L	GF	GA	GD	Win %	Ref
Villaralbo	(Spain)	27 May 2010	30 June 2012	82	48	18	16	140	85	+55	58.54	
Guijuelo	(Spain)	18 July 2013	30 June 2014	38	16	13	9	49	32	+17	42.11	
Valladolid B	(Spain)	30 June 2014	1 July 2015	38	14	10	14	54	54	+0	36.84	
Guijuelo	(Spain)	1 July 2015	27 May 2016	40	18	6	16	36	37	−1	45.00	
Cultural Leonesa	(Spain)	27 May 2016	8 June 2018	91	44	24	23	162	121	+41	48.35	
Al Ahli	(Qatar)	14 December 2018	18 November 2019	24	10	3	11	34	42	−8	41.67	
Viitorul Constanța	(Romania)	7 August 2020	30 November 2020	12	4	4	4	17	18	−1	33.33	
Deportivo La Coruña	(Spain)	12 January 2021	26 May 2021	15	7	3	5	15	8	+7	46.67	
Albacete	(Spain)	2 June 2021	15 June 2022	42	22	10	10	58	38	+20	52.38	
Deportivo La Coruña	(Spain)	16 May 2023	14 June 2023	4	2	1	1	9	5	+4	50.00	
El Salvador	(El Salvador)	19 September 2023	18 December 2023	4	0	3	1	2	3	−1	0.00	
Vizela	(Portugal)	19 December 2023	26 November 2024	34	7	10	17	37	58	−21	20.59	
Cultural Leonesa	(Spain)	24 February 2026	28 May 2026	15	2	4	9	12	27	−15	13.33	
Las Palmas	(Spain)	22 June 2026	12 October 2026	9	3	2	4	13	16	−3	33.33	
Total				448	197	111	140	638	544	+94	43.97	—

== Honours ==
Cultural Leonesa

- Segunda División B: 2016–17
