= Carbilio Tomasino =

Salvadoran footballer and coach

Personal information
- Full name: José Carbilio Tomasino
- Place of birth: Santa Ana, El Salvador
- Date of death: 7 February 1960
- Place of death: Santa Ana, El Salvador
- Position: Midfielder

Senior career*
Years	Team	Apps	(Gls)
- C.D. Olimpic

International career
1929–1930	El Salvador	5	(0)

Managerial career
- 1954–1959: El Salvador
- 1961: FAS
Medal record
Representing El Salvador
Men's Football
Central American and Caribbean Games
Gold medal – first place	1954 El Salvador	Team competition
- * Club domestic league appearances and goals

José Carbilio Tomasino (died 7 February 1960) was a Salvadoran football coach.

Tomasino led the El Salvador team to the Central American and Caribbean titles in 1954. He is the father of Salvadoran football coach Ricardo Tomasino.

== International career ==
On May 1, 1929 he made his international debut for El Salvador in an unofficial friendly against Universidad de Nicaragua, where he also got his first goal, scoring the third in a 3-0 victory. He represented his country at the 1930 Central American Games. Tomasino played for the El Salvador national football team from 1929 to 1930, earning 5 caps.

== Manager career ==
After retiring as a player Carbilio became a coach, He coached the El Salvador national football team and helping to win the 1954 Central American and Caribbean Games title, El Salvador second International title. He Later went on to coach to FAS.
