= Emilio Tomasini =

- Born: Italy
- Occupations: Trader, Financial analyst, Academic

Emilio Tomasini is an Italian Financial analyst, quantitative trader, contributor to the field of technical analysis and the developer of many successful quantitative trading systems. He is famous for his book 'Trading Systems a new approach to portfolio optimization'. He has been publishing since 1997 the daily newsletter Rendimento Borsa on www.emiliotomasini.it which provides technical and fundamental analysis of the financial markets. He is a financial advisor as far as quantitative trading is concerned for many major European banks and money management firms.,

== Early life ==
Emilio Tomasini in 1995 started his career as a financial journalist in Rome for MF Milano Finanza, the leading Italian weekly financial magazine. After realising that fundamental and news analysis alone are not much useful in predicting future prices he quickly turned to quantitative finance developing the first commercial trading systems in Europe. In 1997 he started his newsletter "Rendimento Borsa" that today is one of the major Italian player in financial Alternative Press in Italy. Emilio Tomasini served as an adjunct professor of Economics of the European Integration at the University of Modena and Reggio Emilia, Italy, from 2003 up to 2007 and since 2008 he is Adjunct Professor of Corporate Finance at the University of Bologna, Italy, the most ancient university in the world.

== An international vision of trading ==
Emilio Tomasini is a firm believer of a broader European perspective for traders so that his trading tips and trading systems are often applied on European stocks or forgotten US futures. Emilio Tomasini is Chief Editor of the Italian edition of TRADERS' MAGAZINE www.traders-mag.it, the leading technical analysis and investment monthly publication in Europe with also a German, British, Spanish and Greek edition. Every year since 1999 Emilio Tomasini organizes a European trading contest with real money TRADERS' CUP www.traders-cup.it, an event that gathers together the best European traders during a 3 months competition where both seasoned professional traders and newbies are looking for career opportunities in this launching pad for a serious start in the financial industry.

== A hallmark book in trading systems history ==
There are many ways to build a portfolio of different trading systems and different prices series. Emilio Tomasini started from the premise that traditional Markowitz theory, even if formally genial, has no predictive power since correlations among different prices series are varying from decade to decade. For example, correlation among energy products and industrial and transportation price series is not any longer the same today than in the seventies. It is why in "Trading systems: a new approach to systems development and portfolio optimization" . Emilio Tomasini presents for the first time ever some easy to understand and layman tools to change the cards on the table of portfolio analysis. The book has a very high evaluation on Amazon.
