= Nicolas Tommasini =

French businessman

Nicolas Tommasini (born in 1971) is a French business executive and entrepreneur.

He is the founder and president of both Domaines & Événements, the first French franchise and hospitality management company operating event venues in peri-urban countryside, and D&é Invest, which owns a number of event venue estates in France. As of 2026, the collection includes Domaine de la Thibaudière, Domaine de Vaujoly, Domaine des Barrenques, Domaine d’Aveny and Domaine du Grand Morin.

== Education ==
Tommasini earned a degree in Economics & Finance from the Institut d’Etudes Politiques de Paris in 1992 and a MSc in International Economics & Finance from Lancaster University in 1993.

== Career ==
Tommasini started his career for transport and removal company AGS by launching subsidiaries in Africa and Eastern Europe, specifically managing and developing the Romanian subsidiary in Bucharest during 1995 through 1996. In 1996 he became Deputy to CEO of property manager Bazin S.A. in Paris.

Then, in 1997, he joined Jean-Francois Ott at Orco Property Group in Prague and was responsible for the international development of the company.

In 2000 he developed and headed Orco Budapest and participated in the listing of Orco Property Group in Paris.

In the following years Tommasini and Ott founded the hotel group MaMaison Hotels & Residences which was developed across Central and Eastern Europe. This process spearheaded Orco's international development most notably in Warsaw (2002), Bratislava (2003), and Moscow (2006).

Beginning in 2004 Tommasini and Ott developed Orco in Germany starting by acquiring one asset at a time. They continued this process until they managed over 20 income producing assets in Berlin, specifically in the district of Prenzlaur Berg. Later this developed into the privatization of GSG Berlin in 2006 which changed the profile of Orco Property Group by refocusing it towards Germany.

In 2005 Tommasini was appointed to a Member of the Board at Orco Property Group. By 2009 Tommasini was Deputy CEO and Group CFO overlooking all financial functions, financial reporting, and the financial restructuring of the Group. The climax came with the negotiated EUR 600 million bond equitization finalized in 2013. As a result of this restructuring Tommasini became the COO and MD of Orco Germany, focusing on asset management and development of GSG Berlin along with Orco's main projects.

In 2014 Tommasini left Orco Property Group and founded O&T Partners with Jean-Francois Ott, investors in both real estate and venture capital.

In 2018, he bought the estate Domaine de la Thibaudière west of Paris region which he refurbished and with partner Geoffroy Perdon, opened as an event venue in 2019. Its initial commercial success and the COVID crisis, convinced Tommasini to focus time and investments on this under-structured segment of countryside event venues for both private and corporate events through the creation of the company Domaines & événements.
