= Ricardo Tomasino =

Salvadoran football coach

Personal information
- Full name: Ricardo Arturo Tomasino
- Place of birth: Santa Ana, El Salvador
- Place of death: El Salvador
- Position: Midfielder

International career
Years	Team	Apps	(Gls)
1956	Selección Juvenil de El Salvador		
1965	El Salvador		

Managerial career
- 1974–1975: Juventud Olímpica
- 1976: ANTEL
- 1978: El Salvador
- 1981: Chalatenango
- Alianza

Ricardo Arturo Tomasino (TBA) was a former Salvadoran professional football coach. He is the son of Salvadoran football Player and coach Carbilio Tomasino.
