= 1999 UNCAF Nations Cup squads =

Below are the rosters for the UNCAF Nations Cup 1999 tournament in San José, Costa Rica, from March 17 to March 28, 1999.

== Group A ==
=== Belize ===
Head coach: (Argentina) Manuel Bilches

No.	Pos.	Player	Date of birth (age)	Caps	Club
	GK	Charlie Slusher	28 November 1971 (aged 27)		(Belize) Juventus F.C.
	GK	Darren Hinds	6 November 1972 (aged 26)		(Belize) La Victoria
	GK	Delmar Sutherland	30 January 1971 (aged 28)		(Belize) La Victoria
	DF	Hilberto Muschamp	7 December 1973 (aged 25)		(Belize) Sagitun FC
	DF	Wilbert Valdez			(Belize) Juventud Benqueña
	DF	Raúl Céliz	30 August 1977 (aged 21)		(Belize) Juventus F.C.
	DF	Vallan Symms	20 March 1980 (aged 18)		(Belize) Acros Bombers
	DF	Kevin Pelayo	30 March 1981 (aged 17)		(Belize) Acros Bombers
	MF	Stanley Robinson	12 March 1976 (aged 23)		(Belize) Juventud Benqueña
	MF	Shamir Pacheco	20 February 1979 (aged 20)		(Belize) Juventud Benqueña
	MF	Jason Hall	14 October 1979 (aged 19)		(Belize) La Victoria
	MF	Ernest Wiltshire	13 May 1975 (aged 23)		(Belize) Belmopan Bandits
	MF	Emory Núnez	20 January 1977 (aged 22)		(Belize) Kulture Yabra FC
	MF	Jason McCaulay			(Belize) Kulture Yabra FC
	MF	Robert Cunningham			(Belize) Kulture Yabra FC
	FW	Christopher Hendricks	5 April 1974 (aged 24)		(Belize) Juventus F.C.
	FW	Wílmer García	5 March 1977 (aged 22)		(Belize) Sagitun FC
	FW	Dale Pelayo	20 March 1977 (aged 21)		(Belize) Juventud Benqueña
	FW	Oliver Hendricks	16 October 1975 (aged 23)		(Belize) La Victoria
	FW	Wayne Wiltshire			(Belize) Belmopan Bandits
	FW	Mark Leslie	20 August 1978 (aged 20)		(Belize) Acros Bombers
	FW	Francis Arzú	6 June 1977 (aged 21)		(Belize) Belmopan Bandits

=== Costa Rica ===
Head coach: (Colombia) Francisco Maturana

No.	Pos.	Player	Date of birth (age)	Caps	Club
	GK	Erick Lonnis	9 September 1965 (aged 33)		(Costa Rica) Saprissa
	GK	Lester Morgan	5 March 1976 (aged 23)		(Costa Rica) Herediano
	DF	Jervis Drummond	8 September 1976 (aged 22)		(Costa Rica) Saprissa
	DF	Geovanny Jara	20 July 1969 (aged 29)		(Costa Rica) Herediano
	DF	Víctor Cordero	9 November 1973 (aged 25)		(Costa Rica) Saprissa
	DF	Reynaldo Parks	4 December 1974 (aged 24)		(Mexico) Tecos UAG
	DF	Luis Marín	10 August 1974 (aged 24)		(Guatemala) USAC
	DF	Sandro Alfaro	1 February 1971 (aged 28)		(Costa Rica) Herediano
	MF	Walter Centeno	6 October 1974 (aged 24)		(Costa Rica) Saprissa
	MF	Jeaustin Campos	30 June 1971 (aged 27)		(Costa Rica) Saprissa
	MF	Roy Myers	13 April 1969 (aged 29)		(Costa Rica) Saprissa
	MF	Mauricio Solís	13 December 1972 (aged 26)		(Guatemala) Comunicaciones
	MF	Johnny Murillo	11 November 1972 (aged 26)		(Costa Rica) Herediano
	MF	Jafet Soto	1 April 1976 (aged 22)		(Mexico) Pachuca
	FW	Rolando Fonseca	6 June 1974 (aged 24)		(Guatemala) Comunicaciones
	FW	Gerald Drummond	8 September 1976 (aged 22)		(Costa Rica) Saprissa
	FW	Paulo Wanchope	31 July 1976 (aged 22)		(England) Derby County
	FW	Froylán Ledezma	2 January 1978 (aged 21)		(Netherlands) Ajax

=== Honduras ===
Head coach: (Honduras) Ramón Maradiaga

No.	Pos.	Player	Date of birth (age)	Caps	Club
	GK	Wilmer Cruz	18 December 1965 (aged 33)		(Honduras) Real España
	GK	Hugo Caballero	14 November 1974 (aged 24)		(Honduras) Motagua
	DF	Reynaldo Clavasquin	28 January 1972 (aged 27)		(Honduras) Motagua
	DF	Ninrod Medina	26 August 1976 (aged 22)		(Honduras) Motagua
	DF	Milton Reyes	2 May 1974 (aged 24)		(Honduras) Motagua
	DF	Aminadán Laínez	13 April 1973 (aged 25)		(Honduras) Pumas UNAH
	DF	César Clother	9 December 1973 (aged 25)		(Honduras) Real España
	DF	Iván Guerrero	30 November 1977 (aged 21)		(Honduras) Motagua
	MF	Samuel Caballero	24 December 1974 (aged 24)		(Honduras) Olimpia
	MF	Amado Guevara	2 May 1976 (aged 22)		(Honduras) Motagua
	MF	Christian Santamaría	20 December 1972 (aged 26)		(Honduras) Olimpia
	MF	Mario Cesar Rodríguez	31 July 1975 (aged 23)		(Honduras) Real España
	MF	Robel Bernárdez	8 June 1972 (aged 26)		(Honduras) Platense
	MF	Jaime Rosales	2 June 1978 (aged 20)		(Honduras) Marathón
	FW	Carlos Pavón	9 October 1973 (aged 25)		(Mexico) Atlético Celaya
	FW	Milton Núñez	30 October 1972 (aged 26)		(Uruguay) Nacional
	FW	Francisco Ramírez	10 July 1976 (aged 22)		(Honduras) Motagua
	FW	Renán Benguché	19 October 1973 (aged 25)		(Honduras) Victoria

== Group B ==
=== El Salvador ===
Head coach: (Brazil) Marinho Peres

No.	Pos.	Player	Date of birth (age)	Caps	Club
	GK	Misael Alfaro	6 January 1971 (aged 28)		(El Salvador) Luis Ángel Firpo
	GK	Sergio Muñoz	20 March 1972 (aged 26)		(El Salvador) Dragón
	DF	Alexánder Merino	4 October 1978 (aged 20)		(El Salvador) Alianza
	DF	Nelson Quintanilla	9 April 1973 (aged 25)		(El Salvador) Luis Ángel Firpo
	DF	William Osorio	13 April 1971 (aged 27)		(El Salvador) Luis Ángel Firpo
	DF	Roberto Hernández	3 August 1973 (aged 25)		(El Salvador) Águila
	DF	Mario Guevara	1 March 1971 (aged 28)		(El Salvador) Alianza
	DF	Ricardo Cuéllar			(El Salvador) FAS
	MF	Guillermo García	4 August 1969 (aged 29)		(El Salvador) Luis Ángel Firpo
	MF	Santos Cabrera	1 November 1976 (aged 22)		(El Salvador) Luis Ángel Firpo
	MF	Alexánder Amaya	4 October 1976 (aged 22)		(El Salvador) Águila
	MF	Adonai Martínez	3 October 1975 (aged 23)		(El Salvador) Alianza
	MF	Waldir Guerra	2 April 1967 (aged 31)		(El Salvador) Águila
	MF	Guillermo Rivera	11 January 1969 (aged 30)		(El Salvador) FAS
	MF	Erick Prado	25 January 1976 (aged 23)		(El Salvador) ADET
	MF	Nelson Flores	28 October 1981 (aged 17)		(El Salvador) Sonsonate
	MF	Ernesto Góchez	14 September 1976 (aged 22)		(El Salvador) Árabe Marte
	FW	Elías Montes	25 December 1973 (aged 25)		(El Salvador) Alianza
	FW	Raúl Díaz Arce	1 February 1970 (aged 29)		(United States) San Jose Clash
	FW	Rodrigo Osorio			(El Salvador) Alianza
	FW	Magdonio Corrales	5 September 1975 (aged 23)		(El Salvador) Municipal Limeño
	FW	William Torres	27 October 1976 (aged 22)		(El Salvador) Dragón
	FW	Rudis Corrales	6 November 1979 (aged 19)		(El Salvador) Municipal Limeño

=== Guatemala ===
Head coach: (Guatemala) Benjamín Monterroso

No.	Pos.	Player	Date of birth (age)	Caps	Club
	GK	Edgar Estrada	16 November 1967 (aged 31)		(Guatemala) Comunicaciones
	GK	Julio Engleton	24 January 1962 (aged 37)		(Guatemala) USAC
	DF	Iván León	3 March 1967 (aged 32)		(Guatemala) Comunicaciones
	DF	Alvaro Jiménez	24 November 1974 (aged 24)		(Guatemala) Comunicaciones
	DF	Nelson Cáceres	12 October 1973 (aged 25)		(Guatemala) Comunicaciones
	DF	Guillermo Molina	8 September 1974 (aged 24)		(Guatemala) USAC
	DF	Jorge Pérez	4 February 1965 (aged 34)		(Guatemala) Comunicaciones
	DF	German Ruano	17 October 1971 (aged 27)		(Guatemala) Municipal
	DF	Julio Girón	2 March 1970 (aged 29)		(Guatemala) Municipal
	DF	Catalino Molina	30 November 1969 (aged 29)		(Guatemala) Municipal
	MF	Guillermo Ramírez	26 March 1978 (aged 20)		(Guatemala) Municipal
	MF	Jorge Rodas	9 December 1966 (aged 32)		(Guatemala) Comunicaciones
	MF	Otto Rodríguez	10 April 1974 (aged 24)		(Guatemala) Comunicaciones
	MF	Claudio Rojas	29 November 1973 (aged 25)		(Guatemala) Comunicaciones
	MF	Francisco González	17 October 1977 (aged 21)		(Guatemala) Aurora
	MF	Freddy García	12 January 1977 (aged 22)		(Guatemala) USAC
	MF	Martín Machón	4 February 1973 (aged 26)		(Mexico) Santos Laguna
	FW	Edgar Valencia	31 March 1971 (aged 27)		(Guatemala) Comunicaciones
	FW	Carlos Ruíz	15 September 1979 (aged 19)		(Guatemala) Municipal
	FW	Julio García			(Guatemala) Deportivo Escuintla
	FW	César Alegría	29 October 1977 (aged 21)		(Guatemala) Cobán Imperial

=== Nicaragua ===
Head coach: (Nicaragua) Mauricio Cruz

No.	Pos.	Player	Date of birth (age)	Caps	Club
	GK	William Espinoza	15 December 1972 (aged 26)		(Nicaragua) Diriagén
	GK	Ricardo Sujo	29 March 1977 (aged 21)		(Nicaragua) América Managua
	DF	Otoniel Olivas	28 February 1968 (aged 31)		(Nicaragua) Real Estelí
	DF	Armengol González	19 April 1973 (aged 25)		(Nicaragua) Diriagén
	DF	Ezequiel Jerez	30 April 1971 (aged 27)		(Nicaragua) Diriagén
	DF	David Solórzano	5 November 1980 (aged 18)		(Nicaragua) Diriagén
	DF	Mario Gastón	26 December 1974 (aged 24)		(Nicaragua) Masachapa FC
	DF	Carlos Alonso	25 August 1979 (aged 19)		(Nicaragua) Chinandega
	DF	Sergio Molina	19 October 1977 (aged 21)		(Nicaragua) Walter Ferreti
	MF	Oscar Blanco	18 December 1973 (aged 25)		(Nicaragua) Masachapa FC
	MF	Miguel Cruz	14 June 1978 (aged 20)		(Nicaragua) Diriagén
	MF	Geovanny Estrada	26 April 1978 (aged 20)		(Nicaragua) América Managua
	MF	Rener Cruz			(Nicaragua) Diriagén
	MF	José María Bermúdez	15 August 1975 (aged 23)		(Nicaragua) Real Estelí
	FW	Léster González	18 July 1972 (aged 26)		(Nicaragua) Diriagén
	FW	Tyronne Acevedo	12 July 1978 (aged 20)		(Nicaragua) Diriagén
	FW	Hamilton West	16 October 1977 (aged 21)		(Nicaragua) Masachapa
	FW	Jack Rodríguez			(Nicaragua) Chinandega
