= 2000 CONCACAF Gold Cup squads =

These are the squads for the 2000 CONCACAF Gold Cup.

The position listed for each player is per the official squad list published by CONCACAF. The age listed for each player is as of 12 February 2000, the first day of the tournament. The numbers of caps and goals listed for each player do not include any matches played after the start of the tournament. The club listed is the club for which the player last played a competitive match prior to the tournament. (Note: This is the club a player was last able to play for during the previous season in the event a player did not play a competitive match.) The nationality for each club reflects the national association (not the league) to which the club is affiliated. A flag is included for coaches who are of a different nationality to their team.

== Group A ==
=== Colombia ===
Head coach: Luis Augusto García

No.	Pos.	Player	Date of birth (age)	Caps	Club
1	GK	Miguel Calero	14 April 1971 (aged 28)		(Colombia) Atlético Nacional
2	DF	Andrés Mosquera	9 July 1978 (aged 21)		(Colombia) Deportivo Cali
3	DF	Roberto Carlos Cortés	20 June 1977 (aged 22)		(Colombia) Independiente Medellín
4	DF	Carlos Asprilla	19 October 1970 (aged 29)		(Colombia) Deportivo Cali
5	DF	Gonzalo Martínez	30 November 1975 (aged 24)		(Colombia) Deportes Tolima
6	MF	Jorge Bolaño	5 October 1977 (aged 22)		(Italy) Parma
7	MF	Héctor Hurtado	21 September 1975 (aged 24)		(Brazil) Internacional
8	MF	Frankie Oviedo	21 September 1973 (aged 26)		(Mexico) América
9	FW	Edwin Congo	7 October 1976 (aged 23)		(Spain) Valladolid
10	FW	Faustino Asprilla	10 November 1969 (aged 30)		(Brazil) Palmeiras
11	MF	Martín Zapata	28 October 1970 (aged 29)		(Colombia) Deportivo Cali
12	GK	Juan Carlos Henao	30 December 1971 (aged 28)		(Colombia) Once Caldas
13	DF	Iván López	13 May 1978 (aged 21)		(Colombia) Independiente Santa Fe
14	MF	John Wilmar Pérez	21 February 1970 (aged 29)		(Colombia) Deportivo Cali
15	MF	Gerardo Bedoya	26 November 1975 (aged 24)		(Colombia) Deportivo Cali
16	DF	Bonner Mosquera	2 December 1970 (aged 29)		(Colombia) Millonarios
17	MF	Mayer Candelo	20 February 1977 (aged 22)		(Colombia) Deportivo Cali
18	FW	Jairo Fernando Castillo	17 November 1977 (aged 22)		(Colombia) América de Cali
19	DF	Arley Dinas	16 May 1974 (aged 25)		(Colombia) Deportes Tolima
20	FW	Víctor Bonilla	23 January 1971 (aged 28)		(Spain) Real Sociedad
21	MF	Andrés Chitiva	13 August 1979 (aged 20)		(Colombia) Millonarios
22	GK	Diego Gómez	29 March 1972 (aged 27)		(Colombia) América de Cali

=== Honduras ===
Head coach: Ramón Maradiaga

No.	Pos.	Player	Date of birth (age)	Caps	Club
1	GK	Wilmer Cruz	18 December 1968 (aged 31)		(Honduras) Real España
2	DF	Iván Guerrero	30 November 1979 (aged 20)		(Honduras) Motagua
3	DF	Reynaldo Clavasquín	28 February 1972 (aged 27)		(Honduras) Motagua
4	DF	Samuel Caballero	24 December 1974 (aged 25)		(Honduras) Motagua
5	DF	Milton Reyes	2 May 1974 (aged 25)		(Honduras) Motagua
6	DF	Ninrrol Medina	26 August 1976 (aged 23)		(Honduras) Motagua
8	MF	Oscar Lagos	17 June 1973 (aged 26)		(Honduras) Motagua
9	FW	Carlos Pavón	9 October 1973 (aged 26)		(Mexico) Morelia
10	MF	Julio César de León	13 September 1979 (aged 20)		(Honduras) Platense
11	FW	Milton Núñez	30 November 1972 (aged 27)		(England) Sunderland
12	GK	Hugo Caballero	14 November 1974 (aged 25)		(Honduras) Motagua
14	MF	José Pineda	19 March 1975 (aged 24)		(Honduras) Olimpia
15	DF	Ricky García	21 July 1971 (aged 28)		(Honduras) Real España
16	MF	Francis Javier Reyes	21 October 1976 (aged 23)		(Honduras) Vida
18	MF	Francisco Pavón	28 January 1977 (aged 22)		(Honduras) Victoria
19	DF	Danilo Turcios	8 May 1978 (aged 21)		(Honduras) Universidad
20	MF	Amado Guevara	2 May 1976 (aged 23)		(Honduras) Motagua
21	MF	Jairo Martínez	13 May 1978 (aged 21)		(Honduras) Motagua
22	MF	Alex Pineda Chacón	19 December 1969 (aged 30)		(Honduras) Olimpia
23	FW	Hesler Phillips	18 November 1978 (aged 21)		(Honduras) Universidad

=== Jamaica ===
Head coach: (Brazil) René Simões

No.	Pos.	Player	Date of birth (age)	Caps	Club
1	GK	Warren Barrett	9 September 1970 (aged 29)		(Jamaica) Violet Kickers
2	DF	Michael Johnson	4 July 1973 (aged 26)		(England) Birmingham City
3	DF	Christopher Dawes	31 May 1974 (aged 25)		(Jamaica) Galaxy FC
5	DF	Ian Goodison	21 November 1972 (aged 27)		(Jamaica) Olympic Gardens
6	MF	Hector Wright	8 May 1969 (aged 30)		(Jamaica) Seba United
7	MF	Winston Griffiths	12 September 1978 (aged 21)		(Jamaica) Galaxy FC
8	FW	Marcus Gayle	27 September 1970 (aged 29)		(England) Wimbledon
9	FW	Andy Williams	23 September 1977 (aged 22)		(United States) Miami Fusion
10	FW	Ricardo Fuller	31 October 1979 (aged 20)		(Jamaica) Tivoli Gardens
11	MF	Theodore Whitmore	5 August 1972 (aged 27)		(Jamaica) Seba United
13	GK	Aaron Lawrence	11 August 1970 (aged 29)		(Jamaica) Reno
15	DF	Ricardo Gardner	25 September 1978 (aged 21)		(England) Bolton Wanderers
18	FW	Deon Burton	25 October 1976 (aged 23)		(England) Derby County
19	DF	Frank Sinclair	3 December 1971 (aged 28)		(England) Leicester City
21	DF	Marco McDonald	31 August 1977 (aged 22)		(Jamaica) Tivoli Gardens
22	FW	Paul Hall	3 February 1972 (aged 27)		(England) Coventry City
24	MF	Darryl Powell	15 November 1971 (aged 28)		(England) Derby County
25	MF	Steve Green	2 July 1976 (aged 23)		(Jamaica) Tivoli Gardens

== Group B ==
=== Haiti ===
Head coach: (Haiti) Emmanuel Sanon

No.	Pos.	Player	Date of birth (age)	Caps	Club
1	GK	Geteau Ferdinand	19 May 1974 (aged 25)		(Haiti) Valencia
2	DF	Gilbert Jean-Baptiste	19 February 1973 (aged 26)		(United States) Charleston Battery
3	DF	Frantz Gilles	1 November 1977 (aged 22)		(Haiti) Cavaly
4	DF	Eddy César	3 March 1975 (aged 24)		(Haiti) Carioca
5	FW	Jean-Robert Menelas	11 December 1972 (aged 27)		(Haiti) Roulado
6	DF	Gabriel Michel	12 October 1973 (aged 26)		(Haiti) Don Bosco
7	MF	Sébastien Vorbe	4 June 1976 (aged 23)		(Haiti) Violette
8	FW	Golman Pierre	21 February 1971 (aged 28)		(Haiti) FICA
10	DF	Chrismonor Thelusma	6 March 1971 (aged 28)		(Haiti) Racing Club Haïtien
11	FW	Wilson Chevalier	10 October 1974 (aged 25)		(Haiti) Carioca
13	DF	Pierre Richard Bruny	6 April 1972 (aged 27)		(Haiti) Don Bosco
14	MF	Wilfrid Montilas	25 August 1971 (aged 28)		(Haiti) Don Bosco
15	MF	Ernst Atis-Clotaire	9 December 1977 (aged 22)		(France) Cambrai
16	MF	Carlo Marcelin	10 September 1971 (aged 28)		(Haiti) Cavaly
17	DF	Roosevelt Désir	4 April 1974 (aged 25)		(Haiti) FICA
18	DF	Jean-Roland Dartiguenave	5 March 1969 (aged 30)		(Haiti) Violette
19	FW	Johnny Descolines	8 May 1974 (aged 25)		(Haiti) Violette
22	GK	Didier Menard	26 September 1972 (aged 27)		(United States) Central Florida Kraze

=== Peru ===
Head coach: (Colombia) Francisco Maturana

No.	Pos.	Player	Date of birth (age)	Caps	Club
1	GK	Óscar Ibáñez	8 August 1967 (aged 32)		(Peru) Universitario de Deportes
2	DF	Jorge Huamán	11 April 1977 (aged 22)		(Greece) Veria
3	DF	Juan Reynoso	28 December 1969 (aged 30)		(Mexico) Cruz Azul
4	DF	Marcial Salazar	8 September 1967 (aged 32)		(Peru) Alianza Lima
5	DF	José Soto	11 January 1970 (aged 30)		(Mexico) Celaya
6	DF	Miguel Rebosio	20 October 1976 (aged 23)		(Peru) Sporting Cristal
7	MF	Nolberto Solano	12 December 1974 (aged 25)		(England) Newcastle United
8	MF	Juan José Jayo	20 January 1973 (aged 26)		(Argentina) Unión
9	FW	Flavio Maestri	20 January 1973 (aged 0)		Universidad de Chile
10	MF	Roberto Palacios	28 December 1972 (aged 27)		(Mexico) UAG
11	FW	Roberto Holsen	10 August 1976 (aged 23)		(Peru) Sporting Cristal
12	GK	Marco Flores	29 May 1977 (aged 22)		(Peru) Alianza Lima
13	MF	Marko Ciurlizza	22 February 1978 (aged 21)		(Peru) Universitario de Deportes
14	DF	Jorge Soto	27 October 1971 (aged 28)		(Argentina) Lanús
15	FW	Ysrael Zúñiga	27 August 1976 (aged 23)		(England) Coventry City
16	MF	Freddy Suárez	7 May 1970 (aged 29)		(Peru) FBC Melgar
17	MF	Germán Pinillos	6 April 1972 (aged 27)		(Peru) Sporting Cristal
18	FW	Waldir Sáenz	15 May 1973 (aged 26)		(Argentina) Unión
19	FW	Abel Lobatón	23 November 1977 (aged 22)		(Peru) Sport Boys
20	MF	José del Solar	28 November 1967 (aged 32)		(Peru) Universitario de Deportes
23	MF	Henry Quinteros	19 October 1977 (aged 22)		(Peru) Alianza Lima

=== United States ===
Head coach: Bruce Arena

No.	Pos.	Player	Date of birth (age)	Caps	Club
1	GK	Brad Friedel	18 May 1971 (aged 28)		(England) Liverpool
3	DF	Greg Vanney	11 June 1974 (aged 25)		(United States) Los Angeles Galaxy
4	DF	Robin Fraser	17 December 1966 (aged 33)		(United States) Los Angeles Galaxy
5	DF	C. J. Brown	15 June 1976 (aged 23)		(United States) Chicago Fire
7	MF	Eddie Lewis	17 May 1974 (aged 25)		(United States) San Jose Earthquakes
9	FW	Jovan Kirovski	18 March 1976 (aged 23)		(Germany) Borussia Dortmund
10	MF	Claudio Reyna	20 July 1973 (aged 26)		(Scotland) Rangers
11	FW	Eric Wynalda	9 June 1969 (aged 30)		(United States) Miami Fusion
12	DF	Jeff Agoos	2 April 1968 (aged 31)		(United States) D.C. United
13	MF	Cobi Jones	16 June 1970 (aged 29)		(United States) Los Angeles Galaxy
14	MF	Chris Armas	27 August 1972 (aged 27)		(United States) Chicago Fire
16	DF	Carlos Llamosa	30 May 1969 (aged 30)		(United States) D.C. United
18	GK	Tony Meola	21 February 1969 (aged 30)		(United States) Kansas City Wizards
19	MF	Ben Olsen	3 May 1977 (aged 22)		(United States) D.C. United
20	FW	Brian McBride	19 June 1972 (aged 27)		(United States) Columbus Crew
21	MF	Richie Williams	3 June 1970 (aged 29)		(United States) D.C. United
22	FW	Ante Razov	2 March 1974 (aged 25)		(United States) Chicago Fire
23	DF	Eddie Pope	24 December 1973 (aged 26)		(United States) D.C. United

== Group C ==
=== Guatemala ===
Head coach: (Mexico) Carlos Miloc

No.	Pos.	Player	Date of birth (age)	Caps	Club
1	GK	Edgar Estrada	16 November 1967 (aged 32)		(Guatemala) Comunicaciones
2	DF	Engelver Herrera	11 May 1973 (aged 26)		(Guatemala) Comunicaciones
3	DF	Erick Miranda	17 December 1971 (aged 28)		(Guatemala) Comunicaciones
4	DF	Rigoberto Gómez	9 January 1977 (aged 23)		(Guatemala) Comunicaciones
5	DF	Guillermo Molina	8 September 1974 (aged 25)		(Guatemala) Municipal
6	MF	Julio Girón	2 March 1970 (aged 29)		(Guatemala) Municipal
8	MF	Rudy Ramírez	15 January 1967 (aged 33)		(Guatemala) Municipal
9	MF	Juan Manuel Funes	16 May 1966 (aged 33)		(Guatemala) Comunicaciones
10	FW	Freddy García	12 January 1977 (aged 23)		(Guatemala) Comunicaciones
11	FW	Guillermo Ramírez	26 March 1978 (aged 21)		(Guatemala) Municipal
12	FW	Dionel Bordon	8 January 1970 (aged 30)		(Guatemala) Aurora
13	MF	Edgar Meda	9 October 1970 (aged 29)		(Guatemala) Azucareros de Cotzumalguapa
14	FW	Julio Rodas	9 December 1966 (aged 33)		(Guatemala) Comunicaciones
15	FW	Juan Carlos Plata	1 January 1971 (aged 29)		(Guatemala) Municipal
16	MF	Martín Machón	4 February 1973 (aged 26)		(Mexico) Santos Laguna
17	MF	Jairo Pérez	10 June 1976 (aged 23)		(Guatemala) Municipal
18	GK	Walter Hurtarte	17 July 1967 (aged 32)		(Guatemala) Municipal
19	MF	Edgar Valencia	31 March 1971 (aged 28)		(Guatemala) Comunicaciones
22	FW	Jorge Rodas	9 October 1971 (aged 28)		(Guatemala) Comunicaciones
23	DF	Eduardo Acevedo	8 June 1964 (aged 35)		(Guatemala) Municipal
24	DF	Miguel Coronado	29 March 1970 (aged 29)		(Guatemala) Cobán Imperial

=== Mexico ===
Head coach: Manuel Lapuente

No.	Pos.	Player	Date of birth (age)	Caps	Club
1	GK	Óscar Pérez	1 February 1973 (aged 26)		(Mexico) Cruz Azul
2	DF	Claudio Suárez	17 December 1968 (aged 31)		(Mexico) Guadalajara
3	DF	Sergio Almaguer	16 May 1969 (aged 30)		(Mexico) Necaxa
4	MF	Rafael Márquez	1 February 1979 (aged 20)		(France) Monaco
5	MF	Gerardo Torrado	30 April 1979 (aged 20)		(Mexico) UNAM
6	DF	Ignacio Hierro	22 June 1978 (aged 21)		(Mexico) Guadalajara
7	MF	Ramón Ramírez	5 December 1969 (aged 30)		(Mexico) UANL
8	FW	Adrián Sánchez	9 July 1978 (aged 21)		(Mexico) Puebla
9	FW	José Manuel Abundis	11 June 1973 (aged 26)		(Mexico) Toluca
10	FW	Emilio Mora	7 March 1978 (aged 21)		(Mexico) Morelia
11	FW	Álvaro Ortiz	19 February 1978 (aged 21)		(Mexico) Guadalajara
12	GK	Christian Martínez	16 October 1979 (aged 20)		(Mexico) América
13	DF	Salvador Cabrera	21 August 1973 (aged 26)		(Mexico) Necaxa
14	DF	José María Higareda	16 June 1968 (aged 31)		(Mexico) Necaxa
15	FW	Luis Hernández	22 December 1968 (aged 31)		(Mexico) UANL
16	FW	Jesús Arellano	8 May 1973 (aged 26)		(Mexico) Monterrey
17	FW	Francisco Palencia	28 April 1973 (aged 26)		(Mexico) Cruz Azul
18	MF	Salvador Carmona	22 August 1975 (aged 24)		(Mexico) Toluca
19	DF	Jesús Mendoza	10 January 1979 (aged 21)		(Mexico) Guadalajara

=== Trinidad and Tobago ===
Head coach: Bertille St. Clair

No.	Pos.	Player	Date of birth (age)	Caps	Club
1	GK	Shaka Hislop	22 February 1969 (aged 30)		(England) West Ham United
2	DF	Derek King	12 April 1980 (aged 19)		(Trinidad and Tobago) W Connection
3	DF	Ian Cox	25 March 1971 (aged 28)		(England) Burnley
4	DF	Marvin Andrews	22 December 1975 (aged 24)		(Scotland) Raith Rovers
5	DF	Ronnie Mauge	10 March 1969 (aged 30)		(England) Bristol Rovers
6	DF	Shurland David	19 August 1974 (aged 25)		(Trinidad and Tobago) San Juan Jabloteh
7	MF	Evans Wise	23 November 1973 (aged 26)		(Germany) SSV Ulm
8	MF	Angus Eve	23 February 1973 (aged 26)		(England) Chester City
9	FW	Arnold Dwarika	23 February 1973 (aged 26)		(Trinidad and Tobago) Joe Public
10	FW	Russell Latapy	2 August 1968 (aged 31)		(Scotland) Hibernian
11	FW	Jerren Nixon	25 June 1973 (aged 26)		(Switzerland) Zürich
12	MF	David Nakhid	15 May 1964 (aged 35)		(United Arab Emirates) Emirates Club
13	MF	Ansil Elcock	13 March 1976 (aged 23)		(United States) Columbus Crew
14	MF	Mickey Trotman	17 March 1969 (aged 30)		(Trinidad and Tobago) Joe Public
15	MF	Stokely Mason	21 October 1974 (aged 25)		(Trinidad and Tobago) Joe Public
16	DF	Brent Rahim	24 October 1975 (aged 24)		(United States) UConn Huskies
17	MF	Anthony Rougier	8 August 1978 (aged 21)		(England) Port Vale
19	FW	Dwight Yorke	3 November 1971 (aged 28)		(England) Manchester United
21	GK	Clayton Ince	13 July 1972 (aged 27)		(Scotland) Dundee Utd

== Group D ==
=== Canada ===
Coach: (Germany) Holger Osieck

No.	Pos.	Player	Date of birth (age)	Caps	Goals	Club
1	GK	Craig Forrest	20 September 1967 (aged 32)		0	(The Football Association) West Ham United
2	DF	Paul Fenwick	25 August 1969 (aged 30)		0	(Scottish Football Association) Greenock Morton
4	DF	Tony Menezes	24 November 1974 (aged 25)		0	(Brazilian Football Confederation) Botafogo
5	DF	Jason de Vos (captain)	2 January 1974 (aged 26)		1	(Scottish Football Association) Dundee United
7	DF	Paul Stalteri	18 October 1977 (aged 22)		1	(German Football Association) Werder Bremen
9	FW	Carlo Corazzin	25 December 1971 (aged 28)		6	(The Football Association) Northampton Town
10	MF	Davide Xausa	10 March 1976 (aged 23)		2	(Scottish Football Association) Inverness Caledonian Thistle
11	MF	Jim Brennan	8 May 1977 (aged 22)		1	(The Football Association) Nottingham Forest
12	MF	Jeff Clarke	18 October 1977 (aged 22)		0	(United States Soccer Federation) Baltimore Blast
13	DF	Mark Watson	8 September 1970 (aged 29)		2	(The Football Association) Oxford United
15	DF	Richard Hastings	18 May 1977 (aged 22)		0	(Scottish Football Association) Inverness Caledonian Thistle
16	FW	Garret Kusch	26 September 1977 (aged 22)		0	(Royal Belgian Football Association) Mechelen
17	FW	Paul Peschisolido	25 May 1971 (aged 28)		8	(The Football Association) Fulham
18	FW	Elvis Thomas	27 July 1972 (aged 27)		0	(Canadian Soccer Association) Toronto Olympians
21	MF	Martin Nash	27 December 1975 (aged 24)		2	(The Football Association) Chester City
22	GK	Pat Onstad	13 January 1968 (aged 32)		0	(Scottish Football Association) Dundee United
24	FW	Dwayne De Rosario	15 May 1978 (aged 21)		0	(United States Soccer Federation) Richmond Kickers
24	FW	Robbie Aristodemo	20 May 1977 (aged 22)		0	(United States Soccer Federation) Tulsa Golden Hurricane

=== Costa Rica ===
Head coach: Marvin Rodríguez

No.	Pos.	Player	Date of birth (age)	Caps	Club
1	GK	Hermidio Barrantes	2 September 1964 (aged 35)		(Costa Rica) Alajuelense
2	DF	Javier Delgado	28 July 1968 (aged 31)		(Costa Rica) Alajuelense
3	DF	Víctor Cordero	9 November 1973 (aged 26)		(Costa Rica) Saprissa
4	DF	Mauricio Wright	20 December 1970 (aged 29)		(United States) San Jose Earthquakes
5	MF	Jeaustin Campos	30 June 1971 (aged 28)		(Costa Rica) Municipal Pérez Zeledón
6	MF	Wilmer López	3 August 1971 (aged 28)		(Costa Rica) Alajuelense
7	MF	William Sunsing	12 May 1977 (aged 22)		(Guatemala) Antigua
8	MF	Walter Centeno	6 October 1974 (aged 25)		(Costa Rica) Saprissa
9	FW	Paulo Wanchope	31 July 1976 (aged 23)		(England) West Ham United
10	FW	Jafet Soto	1 April 1976 (aged 23)		(Mexico) Puebla
11	DF	Austin Berry	5 April 1971 (aged 28)		(Guatemala) Antigua
12	DF	Pablo Chinchilla	21 December 1978 (aged 21)		(Costa Rica) Alajuelense
13	DF	Sandro Alfaro	1 January 1971 (aged 29)		(Costa Rica) Alajuelense
15	DF	Harold Wallace	7 November 1975 (aged 24)		(Costa Rica) Alajuelense
16	FW	Rónald Gómez	24 January 1975 (aged 24)		(Greece) OFI
17	FW	Hernán Medford	23 May 1968 (aged 31)		(Mexico) León
18	GK	Álvaro Mesén	24 December 1972 (aged 27)		(Costa Rica) Alajuelense
22	FW	Steven Bryce	16 August 1977 (aged 22)		(Costa Rica) Saprissa

=== South Korea ===
Head coach: Huh Jung-moo

No.	Pos.	Player	Date of birth (age)	Caps	Club
1	GK	Kim Byung-Ji	8 April 1970 (aged 29)		(South Korea) Ulsan Hyundai Horang-i
2	DF	Kang Chul	2 November 1971 (aged 28)		(South Korea) Bucheon SK
4	MF	Seo Dong-Won	14 August 1975 (aged 24)		(South Korea) Daejeon Citizen
5	DF	Lee Lim-Saeng	18 November 1971 (aged 28)		(South Korea) Bucheon SK
6	MF	Yoo Sang-Chul	5 October 1971 (aged 28)		(Japan) Yokohama F. Marinos
7	DF	Kim Tae-Young	8 November 1970 (aged 29)		(South Korea) Chunnam Dragons
8	MF	Noh Jung-Yoon	28 March 1971 (aged 28)		(Japan) Cerezo Osaka
11	FW	Ahn Jung-Hwan	27 January 1976 (aged 23)		(South Korea) Pusan I'cons
12	DF	Lee Young-Pyo	23 April 1977 (aged 22)		(South Korea) Anyang LG Cheetahs
15	DF	Lee Min-Sung	23 June 1973 (aged 26)		(South Korea) Sangmu
16	MF	Kim Do-Kyun	13 January 1977 (aged 23)		(South Korea) Ulsan Hyundai Horang-i
17	DF	Park Jin-sub	11 March 1977 (aged 22)		(South Korea) Sangmu
18	FW	Hwang Sun-Hong	14 July 1968 (aged 31)		(South Korea) Suwon Samsung Bluewings
19	FW	Lee Dong-Gook	29 April 1979 (aged 20)		(South Korea) Pohang Steelers
20	DF	Hong Myung-Bo	12 February 1969 (aged 30)		(Japan) Kashiwa Reysol
21	GK	Lee Woon-Jae	26 April 1973 (aged 26)		(South Korea) Sangmu
22	FW	Lee Kwan-Woo	25 February 1978 (aged 21)		(South Korea) Daejeon Citizen
23	DF	Park Jae-hong	10 November 1978 (aged 21)		(South Korea) Myongji University
24	MF	Seol Ki-Hyeon	8 January 1979 (aged 21)		(Belgium) Antwerp
