= Marco Flores =

Marco Flores may refer to:

- Marcos Flores (born 1985), Argentine footballer
- Marco Flores (Peruvian footballer) (born 1977)
- Marco Flores (songwriter)
- Marco Flores (swimmer)
