= Freddy Suárez =

Freddy Suárez may refer to:

- Freddy Suárez (handballer)
- Freddy Suárez (footballer)
