= Francisco Ramírez (Honduran footballer) =

Honduran footballer (born 1976)

Personal information
- Full name: José Francisco Ramírez Pineda
- Date of birth: 10 July 1976 (age 50)
- Place of birth: Amapala, Valle, Honduras
- Height: 1.75 m (5 ft 9 in)
- Position: Striker

Youth career
- 1994–1996: El Tigre

Senior career*
| Years | Team | Apps | (Gls) |
| 1997–2000 | Motagua | 35 | (27) |
| 2000 | Dundee United | 1 | (0) |
| 2001–2002 | Motagua | 44 | (9) |
| 2002–2005 | Platense | 122 | (50) |
| 2005–2006 | Marathón | 12 | (4) |
| 2006–2007 | Platense | 28 | (4) |
| 2008 | Vida | 12 | (1) |
| 2008 | Vista Hermosa | 15 | (2) |
| 2010 | Walter Ferretti | | (10) |

International career^{‡}
| 1999–2006 | Honduras | 18 | (10) |
- * Club domestic league appearances and goals as of 2005 ‡ National team caps and goals as of 2006

José Francisco Ramírez Pineda (born 10 July 1976) is a retired Honduran footballer.

He was nicknamed Pancho Ra' and was the biggest transfer in the Honduran league, at that time, when Marathón acquired him from Platense in 2006 for 1,6 million lempiras.

== Club career ==
Ramírez started his career at Motagua where he started scoring goals and caught the eye of foreign clubs. In 2000, Ramírez and two teammates from Motagua, Reynaldo Clavasquín and Gustavo Fuentes, were transferred to Scottish Premier League club Dundee United. All three had their contracts cancelled within a few weeks, in Ramírez's case after only four minutes of first team action when he came in as a sub against Celtic on 21 October 2000.

He then returned to Motagua before a prolific spell at Platense and a less successful stint at Marathón. In October 2003 he scored his 50th league goal against Vida. When at Platense, Ramírez was top goalscorer of the 2005 Apertura season with 13 goals and, by May 2009, was the Honduran league's third top goalscorer of all time with 95 goals scored for 4 different teams.

He seemed to end his career at Salvadoran side Vista Hermosa and returned to Honduras in 2009 to drive tourists around in his hometown Amapala with a motorcycle taxi.

In January 2010 he moved abroad again to play for Nicaraguan side Walter Ferretti for whom he would score 10 goals.

| Team | Season | Games | Start | Sub | Goal | YC | RC |
|---|---|---|---|---|---|---|---|
| Club Deportivo Platense | 2002–03 A | 15 | 9 | 4 | 5 | - | - |
| Club Deportivo Platense | 2002–03 C | 14 | 13 | 1 | 4 | - | - |
| Club Deportivo Platense | 2003–04 A | 17 | 15 | 2 | 6 | - | - |
| Club Deportivo Platense | 2003–04 C | 18 | 17 | 1 | 6 | - | - |
| Club Deportivo Platense | 2004–05 A | 18 | 17 | 1 | 6 | - | - |
| Club Deportivo Platense | 2004–05 C | 20 | 18 | 2 | 10 | - | - |
| Club Deportivo Platense | 2005–06 A | 20 | 18 | 2 | 13 | - | - |

== International career ==
Ramírez made his debut for Honduras in a March 1999 UNCAF Nations Cup match against Belize and he immediately scored his first international goal when coming on as a sub for Christian Santamaría. He has earned a total of 18 caps, scoring 10 goals. He has represented his country in 4 FIFA World Cup qualification matches and played at the 1999 UNCAF Nations Cup, as well as at the 2005 CONCACAF Gold Cup.

His final international was a January friendly match against Ecuador.

=== International goals ===
| N. | Date | Venue | Opponent | Score | Result | Competition |
|---|---|---|---|---|---|---|
| 1 | 19 March 1999 | Estadio Nacional, San José, Costa Rica | Belize | 4–1 | 5–1 | 1999 UNCAF Nations Cup |
| 2 | 24 March 1999 | Estadio Nacional, San José, Costa Rica | El Salvador | 3–1 | 3–1 | 1999 UNCAF Nations Cup |
| 3 | 23 July 2000 | National Stadium, Kingston, Jamaica | Jamaica | 1–0 | 1–3 | 2002 FIFA World Cup qualification |
| 4 | 16 August 2000 | Estadio Tiburcio Carías Andino, Tegucigalpa, Honduras | Saint Vincent and the Grenadines | 2–0 | 6–0 | 2002 FIFA World Cup qualification |
| 5 | 16 August 2000 | Estadio Tiburcio Carías Andino, Tegucigalpa, Honduras | Saint Vincent and the Grenadines | 4–0 | 6–0 | 2002 FIFA World Cup qualification |
| 6 | 15 November 2000 | Arnos Vale Stadium, Kingstown, Saint Vincent and the Grenadines | Saint Vincent and the Grenadines | 1–0 | 7–0 | 2002 FIFA World Cup qualification |
| 7 | 15 November 2000 | Arnos Vale Stadium, Kingstown, Saint Vincent and the Grenadines | Saint Vincent and the Grenadines | 2–0 | 7–0 | 2002 FIFA World Cup qualification |
| 8 | 25 April 2003 | Stade Riviére-Pilote, Fort-de-France, Martinique | Trinidad and Tobago | 2–0 | 2–0 | 2003 CONCACAF Gold Cup qualification |
| 9 | 27 April 2003 | Stade d'Honneur de Dillon, Fort-de-France, Martinique | Martinique | 2–1 | 4–2 | 2003 CONCACAF Gold Cup qualification |
| 10 | 2 July 2005 | Swangard Stadium, Burnaby, Canada | Canada | 1–0 | 2–1 | Friendly match |
