= Claudio Rojas =

Guatemalan footballer

Personal information
- Full name: Claudio Ariel Rojas Martínez
- Date of birth: November 29, 1973 (age 52)
- Place of birth: Guatemala
- Height: 1.67 m (5 ft 6 in)
- Position: Attacking midfielder

Youth career
- 1992–1993: River Plate

Senior career*
| Years | Team | Apps | (Gls) |
| 1993–1994 | River Plate | 17 | (0) |
| 1994–1995 | San Lorenzo de Almagro | 7 | (0) |
| 1997–1998 | Instituto | | |
| 1998–2004 | Comunicaciones | 107 | (12) |
| 2004–2005 | Municipal | 15 | (0) |
| 2005–2006 | Jalapa | 11 | (1) |
| 2006–2007 | Mixco | | |
| 2007–2008 | Petapa | 4 | (0) |

International career^{‡}
| 1997–2001 | Guatemala | 24 | (0) |
| 2000 | Guatemala (futsal) | | |
- * Club domestic league appearances and goals as of 10 August 2010 ‡ National team caps and goals as of 10 August 2010

Claudio Ariel Rojas Martínez (born 29 November 1973) is a retired Guatemalan football midfielder who has played for Argentinian giants River Plate.

== Club career ==
A small midfield player, Rojas played for Argentinian clubs River Plate, San Lorenzo and Instituto in the mid-1990s before returning to Guatemalan giants Comunicaciones for 5 years and then left them for eternal rivals Municipal in 2004. He then switched clubs every year, featuring in Jalapa, Mixco and Petapa squads before retiring.

== International career ==
He made his debut for Guatemala in a November 1997 friendly match against Chile and has earned a total of 24 caps, scoring no goals. He has represented his country in 3 FIFA World Cup qualification matches and played at the 1999 and 2001 as well as at the 1998 Gold Cup. In 2000, as the Guatemala national futsal team had begun its development, he was selected, along with other 11-a-side football players, as part of the squad that competed at the 2000 Futsal World Championship, hosted by Guatemala. His final international was a May 2001 UNCAF Nations Cup match against Costa Rica.
