= Didier Menard =

American-born Haitian footballer (born 1972)

Personal information
- Full name: Francois Didier Menard
- Date of birth: 26 September 1972 (age 54)
- Place of birth: New York City, U.S.
- Position: Goalkeeper

Senior career*
Years	Team	Apps	(Gls)
–1995	Cocoa Expos		
1995	Tromsø	0	(0)

International career
1999–2000	Haiti	7	(0)
- * Club domestic league appearances and goals

Didier Menard (born 26 September 1972) is an American retired-born Haitian football goalkeeper.

Born in New York, his parents split when he was a year old. His mother moved to Orlando, but for a time Menard was raised by other relatives in Montreal. Moving back to Orlando, Menard made his way into the local team Cocoa Expos.

In 1995, Norwegian team Tromsø IL saw their goalkeeper and team captain Tor Andre Grenersen sustain an injury. Menard was signed on a short-term basis to compete with Tromsø's then-reserve goalkeeper Thomas Tøllefsen. Menard made his Tromsø debut in the 1995 UEFA Intertoto Cup as a 55th-minute substitute for Tøllefsen away against FC Universitatea Cluj. He was the first black goalkeeper in Norwegian top-flight football. However, Grenersen returned from injury before Menard got to play any league games, and Menard was sent back to the US.

In 1999 and 2000 Menard represented Haiti and won 7 international caps.
