= Marco McDonald =

Jamaican footballer (born 1977)

Marco McDonald (born 31 August 1977) is a Jamaican former football defender who last played for Waterhouse F.C.

== Career ==
Nicknamed 'Snake', the no-nonsense defender has also played for Tivoli Gardens F.C. in the Jamaica National Premier League.

== International career ==
He made his debut for the Reggae Boyz in 1998 against Macedonia and played his last in 2003 against Mexico, collecting a total of 29 caps (no goals scored).
