= Ernst Atis-Clotaire =

Haitian-French footballer (born 1977)

Personal information
- Date of birth: December 9, 1977 (age 48)
- Place of birth: Port-au-Prince, Haiti
- Height: 1.74 m (5 ft 9 in)
- Position: Defender

Youth career
- 1991–1992: AAS Sarcelles
- 1992–1995: AS Monaco FC

Senior career*
| Years | Team | Apps | (Gls) |
| 1995–1998 | AS Monaco FC | 2 | (0) |
| 1998–1999 | AC Ajaccio | 18 | (0) |
| 1999–2000 | AC Cambrai | 22 | (3) |
| 2001–2002 | SC Draguignan | 22 | (0) |
| 2002–2003 | US Saint-Georges-les-Ancizes | 22 | (1) |

International career
| 1996 | France U19 | 11 | (0) |
| 1997 | France U20 | 2 | (0) |
| 1999–2002 | Haiti | 11 | (0) |
- * Club domestic league appearances and goals

Ernst Atis-Clotaire (born 9 December 1977) is a former Haitian-French footballer, who played three seasons for AS Monaco in Ligue 1.

Atis-Clotaire won the 1996 UEFA European Under-18 Championship with France and appeared for the Haiti national football team eleven times during Caribbean Cup competitions in 2000 and 2002.
