= Gerald Drummond =

Costa Rican footballer (born 1976)

Personal information
- Full name: Gerald George Drummond Johnson
- Date of birth: September 8, 1976 (age 50)
- Place of birth: Limón, Costa Rica
- Height: 1.72 m (5 ft 8 in)
- Position: Forward

Youth career
- Deportivo Saprissa

Senior career*
Years	Team	Apps	(Gls)
1995–2002	Saprissa		
2003	Herediano		
2003–2006	Saprissa		
2006–2008	Herediano	36	(8)
2008–2009	Ramonense	8	(0)

International career
1996–2003	Costa Rica	16	(6)
- * Club domestic league appearances and goals

Gerald George Drummond Johnson (born September 8, 1976) is a Costa Rican former football player who played as a forward.

== Club career ==
Drummond made his professional debut with Saprissa on 8 November 1995 against Ramonense and he won four national championships with them and two CONCACAF Champions Cups, and was part of the team that played the 2005 FIFA Club World Championship, where Saprissa finished third behind São Paulo and Liverpool.

He joined Ramonense in the summer of 2008 and retired in February 2009.

== International career ==
Drummond played with his brother in the U-20 Football World Youth Championship held in Qatar in 1995, as well as in Brazilian team Flamengo's minor league system.

He made his debut for Costa Rica in an October 1996 friendly match against Venezuela and earned a total of 16 caps, scoring 6 goals. He represented his country at the 1997 and 1999 UNCAF Nations Cups.

His final international was an August 2003 friendly match against Austria.

=== International goals ===
Scores and results list Costa Rica's goal tally first.

N.	Date	Venue	Opponent	Score	Result	Competition
1.	19 February 1997	Estadio Rosabal Cordero, Herediano, Costa Rica	Venezuela	3–1	5–2	Friendly match
2.	10 February 1999	Independence Park (Jamaica), Kingston, Jamaica	Jamaica	1–0	1–1	Friendly match
3.	24 February 1999	Estadio Ricardo Saprissa Aymá, San José, Costa Rica	Jamaica	6–0	9–0	Friendly match
4.	24 February 1999	Estadio Ricardo Saprissa Aymá, San José, Costa Rica	Jamaica	7–0	9–0	Friendly match
5.	24 February 1999	Estadio Ricardo Saprissa Aymá, San José, Costa Rica	Jamaica	8–0	9–0	Friendly match
6.	17 March 1999	Estadio Nacional, San José, Costa Rica	Belize	7–0	7–0	1999 UNCAF Nations Cup

== Personal life ==
He is married to Karol Hernández. His twin brother, Jervis Drummond, also played for Saprissa and the national team. His son, also called Gerald, is an athlete.
