= 1999 UNCAF Nations Cup =

Tournament details
- Host country: Costa Rica
- Teams: 6 (from 1 sub-confederation)

Final positions
- Champions: Costa Rica (3rd title)
- Runners-up: Guatemala
- Third place: Honduras
- Fourth place: El Salvador

Tournament statistics
- Matches played: 12
- Goals scored: 33 (2.75 per match)

The 1999 UNCAF Nations Cup was a UNCAF Nations Cup held in San Jose, Costa Rica in March 1999. The host team won the tournament's final group. Costa Rica then qualified automatically, alongside second-placed Guatemala and third-placed Honduras for the 2000 CONCACAF Gold Cup.

== Participating teams ==
6 UNCAF teams participated in the tournament

- Belize
- Costa Rica (Hosts) and (Defending Champions)
- El Salvador
- Guatemala
- Honduras
- Nicaragua

Panama Did not enter the tournament

== Squads ==
For a complete list of all participating squads see UNCAF Nations Cup 1999 squads

== Stadium ==
1999 UNCAF Nations Cup is located in Costa Rica	San José
1999 UNCAF Nations Cup is located in Costa Rica	Estadio Nacional
1999 UNCAF Nations Cup is located in Costa Rica	Capacity: 25,000

== First round ==
All games were played in San José, Costa Rica.

=== Group A ===
Team	Pld	W	D	L	GF	GA	GD	Pts
Honduras	2	2	0	0	6	1	+5	6
Costa Rica	2	1	0	1	7	1	+6	3
Belize	2	0	0	2	1	12	−11	0

17 March 1999

Costa Rica	7–0	Belize
Wanchope 2'; Fonseca 17', 72'; Ledezma 27', 32'; Soto 54'; Drummond 79'

Estadio Nacional

19 March 1999

Honduras	5–1	Belize
Caballero 13'; Nunez 34'; Guevara 65'; Ramírez 77'; Benguché 85'		Garcia 57'

Estadio Nacional

21 March 1999

Honduras	1–0	Costa Rica
Pavon 14'

Estadio Nacional

=== Group B ===
Team	Pld	W	D	L	GF	GA	GD	Pts
Guatemala	2	1	1	0	2	1	+1	4
El Salvador	2	1	1	0	2	1	+1	4
Nicaragua	2	0	0	2	0	2	-2	0

17 March 1999

Guatemala	1–0	Nicaragua
Rhodes 51'

Estadio Nacional

19 March 1999

Guatemala	1–1	El Salvador
Ruiz 27'		Corrales 21'

Estadio Nacional

21 March 1999

El Salvador	1–0	Nicaragua
Corrales 34'

Estadio Nacional

== Final round ==
Team	Pld	W	D	L	GF	GA	GD	Pts
Costa Rica	3	2	0	1	6	2	+4	6
Guatemala	3	2	0	1	3	1	+2	6
Honduras	3	2	0	1	5	4	+1	6
El Salvador	3	0	0	3	1	8	-7	0

24 March 1999

Costa Rica	1–0	Guatemala
Fonseca 34'

Estadio Nacional, San José
Referee: Borja (MEX)
24 March 1999

Honduras	3–1	El Salvador
Núñez 44', 77'; Ramírez 90'		Quintanilla 62'

Estadio Nacional, San José
Referee: Bynoe (TRI)

26 March 1999

Guatemala	1–0	El Salvador
García 55'

Estadio Nacional, San José
Referee: Bynoe (TRI)
26 March 1999

Costa Rica	1–2	Honduras
Fonseca 36'		Clavasquín 10' (pen.); Pavón 75'

Estadio Nacional, San José
Referee: Borja (MEX)

28 March 1999

Costa Rica	4–0	El Salvador
Bryce 13'; Row 42'; Fonseca 46'; Wanchope 53' (pen.)

Estadio Nacional, San José
Attendance: 10,000
Referee: Bardales (HON)
28 March 1999

Honduras	0–2	Guatemala
		Rodas 8'; Machón 89'

Estadio Nacional, San José
Attendance: 10,000
Referee: Rodríguez (SLV)

== Champions ==
1999 UNCAF Nations Cup winner

Costa Rica
Third title

- Costa Rica, Guatemala and Honduras qualified automatically for the 2000 CONCACAF Gold Cup. El Salvador entered a play-off for qualification with Canada, Haiti and Cuba.

== All Star Team ==
As voted for by the CONCACAF technical Commission. A squad rather than an eleven was selected:

Goalkeepers:

- (Honduras) Wilmer Cruz
- (Costa Rica) Erick Lonnis

Defenders:

- (Costa Rica) Jervis Drummond
- (Guatemala) Julio Girón
- (El Salvador) José Hernández
- (Honduras) Ninrod Medina
- (Guatemala) Erick Miranda
- (Honduras) Milton Reyes

Midfielders:

- (Honduras) Jorge Caballero
- (Costa Rica) Jeaustin Campos
- (Honduras) Robel Benárdez
- (Costa Rica) Rolando Fonseca
- (El Salvador) Guillermo García
- (Honduras) Christian Santamaría

Forwards:

- (Honduras) Milton Nunez
- (Honduras) Carlos Pavón
- (Honduras) José Ramírez
- (Guatemala) Jorge Rodas
