= Sandro Alfaro =

Costa Rican footballer (born 1971)

Personal information
- Full name: Sandro Alfaro Gamboa
- Date of birth: 1 January 1971 (age 55)
- Place of birth: San Carlos, Costa Rica
- Position: Defender

Senior career*
| Years | Team | Apps | (Gls) |
| 1990– | Puntarenas | | |
| 1994–1996 | San Carlos | | |
| 1996–1999 | Herediano | | |
| 1999–2003 | Alajuelense | | |
| 2003–2004 | Cartaginés | | |
| 2004 | Puntarenas | | |

International career^{‡}
| 1991–2000 | Costa Rica | 27 | (1) |
- * Club domestic league appearances and goals as of 21 April 2014 ‡ National team caps and goals as of 1 January 2014

Sandro Alfaro Gamboa (born 1 January 1971 in San Carlos) is a retired Costa Rican professional footballer. He played for several clubs in Costa Rica.

== Club career ==
Alfaro played for Puntarenas from 1990, Asociación Deportiva San Carlos, Club Sport Herediano, L.D. Alajuelense and C.S. Cartaginés. He won the Primera División de Costa Rica with Alajuelense four times, during the 1999-00, 2000–01, 2001–02 and 2002-03 seasons.

== International career ==
Alfaro made his debut for Costa Rica in an April 1991 friendly match against Mexico and has earned a total of 27 caps, scoring 1 goal. He has represented his country in 5 FIFA World Cup qualification matches and played at the 1999 UNCAF Nations Cup and the 1997 Copa América.

His final international was a July 2000 FIFA World Cup qualification match against the United States.

=== International goals ===
Scores and results list Costa Rica's goal tally first.

| N. | Date | Venue | Opponent | Score | Result | Competition |
|---|---|---|---|---|---|---|
| 1. | 2 February 2000 | Estadio Ricardo Saprissa Aymá, San José, Costa Rica | Chile | 1–0 | 1–0 | Friendly match |

== Personal life ==
Married to Yendry, they have a daughter called María Fernanda.
