= Jervis Drummond =

Costa Rican footballer (born 1976)

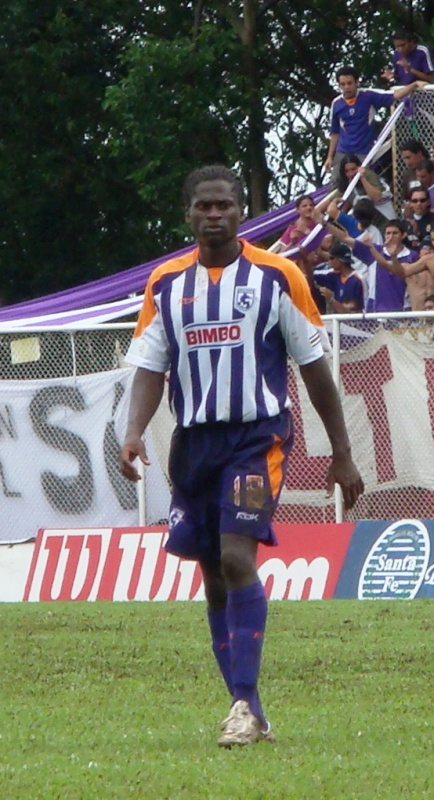
- Drummond playing for Saprissa in 2007

Personal information
- Full name: Jervis Éarlson Drummond Johnson
- Date of birth: September 8, 1976 (age 50)
- Place of birth: Limón, Costa Rica
- Height: 1.72 m (5 ft 8 in)
- Position: Right-back

Youth career
- 1993–1995: Goicochea

Senior career*
Years	Team	Apps	(Gls)
1995–2010	Saprissa	452	(12)

International career
1995–2008	Costa Rica	73	(1)
- * Club domestic league appearances and goals

Jervis Éarlson Drummond Johnson (born September 8, 1976) is a Costa Rican former footballer who played as a right-back.

== Club career ==
Drummond made his professional debut with Saprissa on 5 November 1995 against San Carlos and scored his first goal on 15 January 1997 against Herediano. He played his entire career for Saprissa, winning five national championships and two CONCACAF Champions Cups. He also played at the 2005 FIFA Club World Championship, where Saprissa finished third behind São Paulo and Liverpool. He played 452 league matches for Saprissa and 574 including cup and international matches.

In November 2010, Saprissa announced that Drummond would not play again for the club.

== International career ==
Drummond playing for Costa Rica at the 2006 FIFA World Cup

Drummond played with his brother in the 1995 FIFA World Youth Championship in Qatar.

He made his debut for the Costa Rican senior team in a September 1995 friendly match against Jamaica and earned a total of 73 caps, scoring 1 goal. He represented his country in 19 FIFA World Cup qualification matches and was selected for the 2002 World Cup, but didn't play a single match. He played at the 2006 World Cup, at the 1999, 2003 and 2007 UNCAF Nations Cups, as well as at the 1998, 2002 and 2007 CONCACAF Gold Cups. He also played at the 2001 Copa América.

His final international was an August 2008 FIFA World Cup qualification against El Salvador.

=== International goals ===
Scores and results list Costa Rica's goal tally first.

N.	Date	Venue	Opponent	Score	Result	Competition
1.	24 February 1999	Estadio Ricardo Saprissa Aymá, San José, Costa Rica	Jamaica	3–0	9–0	Friendly match

== Retirement ==
After retiring as a player, Drummond became manager at the Saprissa stadium restaurant.

== Personal life ==
He is married to Laura Brenes. His twin brother, Gerald Drummond, also played for the national team and Saprissa.
