= Oscar Blanco =

Argentine footballer

Personal information
- Full name: Oscar Domingo Blanco Melillo
- Date of birth: 20 November 1948
- Place of birth: Zárate, Buenos Aires, Argentina
- Date of death: 27 June 2020 (aged 71)
- Place of death: Buenos Aires, Argentina
- Position: Defender

Youth career
- Plumerillo
- Boca Juniors

Senior career*
Years	Team	Apps	(Gls)
1969–1972	Boca Juniors	6	(0)
1970–1971	→ Deportivo Morón (loan)		
1973	Racing Club		
1974–1975	Santiago Wanderers	43	(3)
1975	All Boys		
1976–1977	Emelec		
1978	Unión La Calera		
1979	Santiago Wanderers	30	(0)
1980	Deportivo Morón		

Managerial career
- 1981: Boca Juniors (assistant)
- 1984: All Boys (assistant)
- 1984: Estudiantes BA (assistant)
- 1985: Belgrano de Paraná (assistant)
- 1987–1990: Boca Juniors (youth)
- 1991: Santiago Wanderers
- 1993–1995: Boca Juniors (youth)
- 1995: Boca Juniors (assistant)
- 1996: Instituto (assistant)
- 1996–1997: San Miguel
- 1998–1999: Vida
- 1999: San Miguel
- 1999–2000: Banfield
- 2001: Independiente Rivadavia
- 2002–2003: Atlético Rafaela
- 2003–2004: Unión Santa Fe
- 2004: San Martín Mendoza
- 2005: Emelec
- 2005–2006: Huracán TA
- 2006: Almagro
- 2007–2009: Sportivo Italiano
- 2010: Los Andes
- 2010–2011: Deportivo Morón
- 2011–2012: Acassuso
- 2013: Defensores de Belgrano
- 2013: Estudiantes BA
- 2014: Textil Mandiyú
- 2015: Boca Juniors Rojas
- * Club domestic league appearances and goals

Oscar Domingo Blanco Melillo (20 November 1948 – 27 June 2020) was an Argentine football manager and player who played as a defender. Besides Argentina, he played for clubs in Chile and Ecuador.

== Club career ==
- (Argentina) Boca Juniors 1969–1970
- (Argentina) Deportivo Morón 1970–1971
- (Argentina) Boca Juniors 1972
- (Argentina) Racing Club 1973
- (Chile) Santiago Wanderers 1974–1975
- (Argentina) All Boys 1975
- (Ecuador) Emelec 1976–1977
- (Chile) Unión La Calera 1978
- (Chile) Santiago Wanderers 1979
- (Argentina) Deportivo Morón 1980

== Managerial career ==
- (Chile) Santiago Wanderers 1991
- (Argentina) San Miguel 1996–1997
- (Honduras) Vida 1998–1999
- (Argentina) San Miguel 1999
- (Argentina) Banfield 1999–2000
- (Argentina) Independiente Rivadavia 2001
- (Argentina) Atlético de Rafaela 2002–2003
- (Argentina) Unión de Santa Fe 2003–2004
- (Argentina) San Martín de Mendoza 2004
- (Ecuador) Emelec 2005
- (Argentina) Huracán de Tres Arroyos 2005–2006
- (Argentina) Almagro 2006
- (Argentina) Sportivo Italiano 2007–2009
- (Argentina) Los Andes 2010
- (Argentina) Deportivo Morón 2010–2011
- (Argentina) Acassuso 2011–2012
- (Argentina) Defensores de Belgrano 2013
- (Argentina) Estudiantes de Buenos Aires 2013
- (Argentina) Textil Mandiyú 2014
- (Argentina) Boca Juniors de Rojas 2015
