= Marco Flores (Peruvian footballer) =

Peruvian footballer (born 1977)

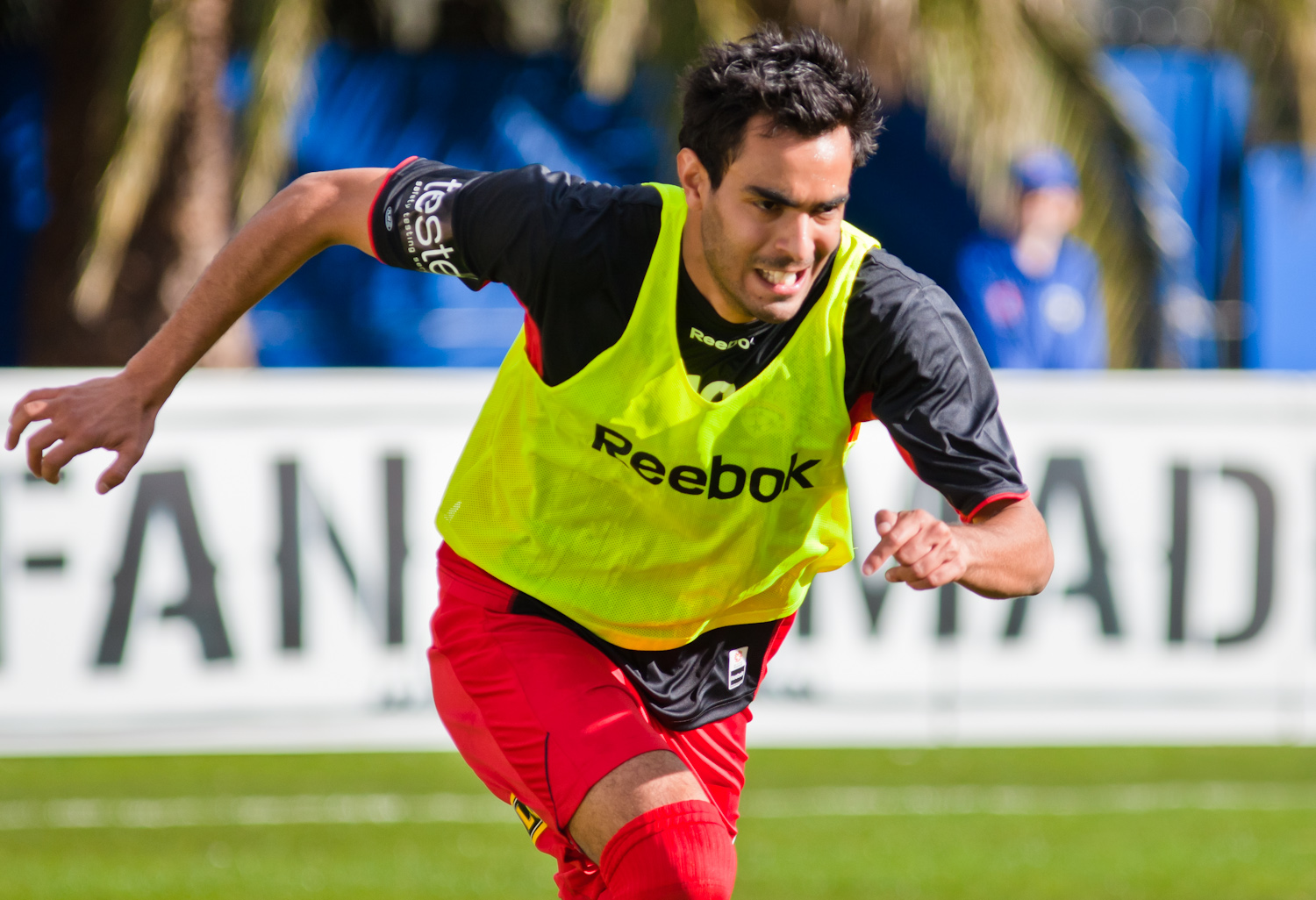

Personal information
- Full name: Marco Christian Flores Luján
- Date of birth: 29 May 1977 (age 49)
- Place of birth: Peru
- Position: Goalkeeper

Senior career*
Years	Team	Apps	(Gls)
-1998	Bella Esperanza		
1999-2001	Club Alianza Lima		
2002	Juan Aurich		
2003-2004	Estudiantes de Medicina		
2004	Sporting Cristal		
2005-2009	Club Deportivo Universidad de San Martín de Porres	13+	(0+)
2010	Sport Huancayo	26	(0)
2011	José Gálvez FBC		
2012	Club Deportivo Universidad César Vallejo	13	(0)
2012	Sport Boys	5	(0)
2013	Alfonso Ugarte de Puno	21	(0)
2014-2015	Deportivo Coopsol	25	(0)
- * Club domestic league appearances and goals

Marco Christian Flores Luján (born 29 May 1977 in Peru) is a Peruvian retired footballer.

== Career ==
Despite playing for Club Alianza Lima, the second-most successful club in Peru, for two years, Flores only won one league title with them and won two titles with Club Deportivo Universidad de San Martín de Porres, the first in their history.
