= Christian Santamaría =

Honduran footballer (born 1972)

Christian Reniery Santamaría
Personal information
- Full name: Christian Reniery Santamaría
- Date of birth: 20 December 1972 (age 53)
- Place of birth: La Ceiba, Honduras
- Height: 1.76 m (5 ft 9 in)
- Position: Midfielder

Youth career
- Olimpia de Tela

Senior career*
Years	Team	Apps	(Gls)
1992–2002	Olimpia		(34)
1997	Millonarios		
1999	Atlético Celaya	12	(0)
2002–2004	Cartaginés		
2005	Municipal Limeño		
2005–2006	Platense		
2006–2007	Águila		

International career
1994–2003	Honduras	46	(4)
- * Club domestic league appearances and goals

Christian Reniery Santamaría (born 20 December 1972) is a retired Honduran football player who made his name with Olimpia and the national team in the second half of the 1990s.

== Club career ==
Santamaría started his career at Olimpia and remained there for 10 years, except for a season at Millonarios in Colombia with whom he played in the 1997 Copa Libertadores and at Mexican side Atlético Celaya. In 2002, he moved abroad again to join Costa Rican outfit Cartaginés and he was signed by Salvadorans Municipal Limeño for the 2005 Clausura only to return to Honduras to play a season at Platense. In 2006, he had another spell in El Salvador when he was named one of three new players for Águila.

== International career ==
Santamaría made his debut for Honduras in a December 1994 friendly match against the USA and has earned a total of 46 caps, scoring 4 goals. He has represented his country in 13 FIFA World Cup qualification matches and played at the 1995 and 1999 UNCAF Nations Cups as well as at the 1996 and 1998 CONCACAF Gold Cups.

His final international was a June 2003 friendly match against El Salvador.

=== International goals ===
Scores and results list Honduras' goal tally first.

N.	Date	Venue	Opponent	Score	Result	Competition
1.	28 August 1996	Estadio Francisco Morazán, San Pedro Sula, Honduras	Cuba	1–0	2-2	Friendly match
2.	13 October 1996	Arnos Vale Stadium, Kingstown, Saint Vincent and the Grenadines	Saint Vincent and the Grenadines	2–0	4-1	1998 FIFA World Cup qualification
3.	13 October 1996	Arnos Vale Stadium, Kingstown, Saint Vincent and the Grenadines	Saint Vincent and the Grenadines	3–0	4-1	1998 FIFA World Cup qualification
4.	15 November 2000	Arnos Vale Stadium, Kingstown, Saint Vincent and the Grenadines	Saint Vincent and the Grenadines	4–0	7–0	2002 FIFA World Cup qualification

== Personal life and political career ==
Santamaría is a son of Raúl Graugnard and Mary Santamaría. He took his mother's name since his father left them to study in his native Brazil. Santamaría is married and has a daughter, Christian Naville.

After he retired from playing, he became a football commentator and started an acting career. In December 2012, Santamaría officially became the first candidate to be MP of the Liberal Party for Atlántida Department.

== Honours and awards ==
=== Club ===
C.D. Olimpia

- Liga Profesional de Honduras (4): 1992–93, 1995–96, 1996–97, 1998–99
- Honduran Cup: (2): 1995, 1998

=== Country ===
Honduras

- Copa Centroamericana (1): 1995
