= Freddy Suárez (footballer) =

Peruvian footballer and manager (born 1970)

Personal information
- Full name: Freddy Isaías Suárez Peñaloza
- Date of birth: 7 May 1970 (age 56)
- Place of birth: Ilo, Peru
- Height: 1.78 m (5 ft 10 in)
- Position: Midfielder

Senior career*
Years	Team	Apps	(Gls)
?	Mariscal Nieto		
1992	Sportivo Huracán		
1993–1994	Cienciano		
1995–2003	FBC Melgar		
2004–2005	Atlético Universidad		
2006–2007	Total Clean		
2008–2009	Cobresol		
2011	Sportivo Huracán		

International career
1999–2000	Peru	2	(0)

Managerial career
- 2013: Juvenil Andino
- 2014: FBC Aurora
- 2014: Deportivo Los Ángeles
- 2015: Saetas de Oro
- * Club domestic league appearances and goals

Freddy Isaías Suárez Peñaloza (born on 7 May 1970) is a Peruvian football manager and former player.

== Playing career ==
=== Club career ===
After a stint with Cienciano of Cusco between 1993 and 1994, Freddy Suárez spent the majority of his career with clubs in the Arequipa region, including FBC Melgar, where he played from 1995 to 2003 and served as captain.

In 2006, he won his only title as a player, the Copa Perú, with Total Clean of Arequipa. In 2011, he ended his career with Sportivo Huracán, the club where he began his professional career in 1992.

=== International career ===
A two-time Peruvian international between 1999 and 2000, Freddy Suárez was part of the group that competed in the 2000 CONCACAF Gold Cup in the United States where Peru was invited to participate, reaching the semi-finals.

== Managerial career ==
Having become a coach, he notably managed FBC Aurora of Arequipa in 2014.

== Honours ==
=== Player ===
Total Clean

- Copa Perú: 2006
