= Jeaustin Campos =

Costa Rican footballer (born 1971)

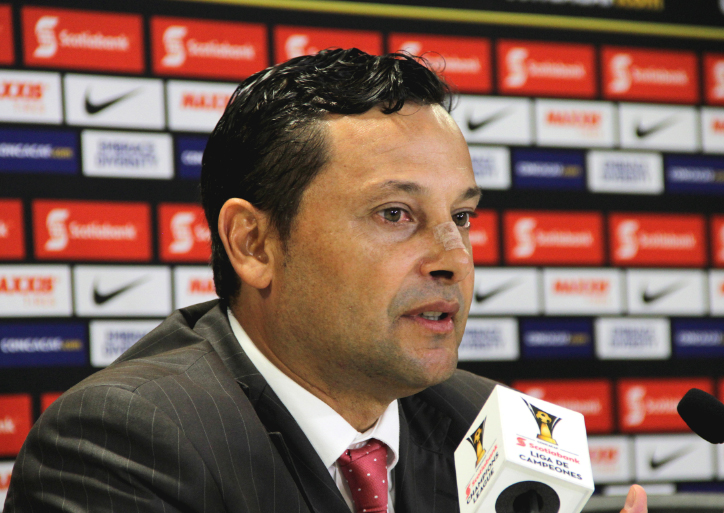
- Campos in Campos

Personal information
- Full name: Jeaustin Campos Madriz
- Date of birth: June 30, 1971 (age 55)
- Place of birth: San Isidro, Costa Rica
- Height: 1.75 m (5 ft 9 in)
- Position: Midfielder

Youth career
- 1977–1990: Saprissa

Senior career*
Years	Team	Apps	(Gls)
1990–1992	Pérez Zeledón		
1992–1995	Saprissa		
1995–1996	LG Cheetahs	17	(2)
1996–1999	Saprissa		
1999–2001	Pérez Zeledón		
2001–2002	Saprissa		

International career
1997–2001	Costa Rica	20	(0)

Managerial career
- 2006–2009: Saprissa
- 2010: Bayamón
- 2011: Pérez Zeledón
- 2011–2013: Puerto Rico
- 2014–2015: Saprissa
- 2016–2017: Cartaginés
- 2017–2018: Blooming
- 2018: ADR Jicaral (assistant)
- 2019: ADR Jicaral
- 2020: Nacional Potosí
- 2020–2021: San Carlos
- 2021–2022: Herediano
- 2022–2023: Saprissa
- * Club domestic league appearances and goals

Jeaustin Campos Madriz (born June 30, 1971) is a Costa Rican football manager and retired player.

== Club career ==
Campos was one of the most famous Costa Rica n football midfielders during the 1990s and played most of his career with Deportivo Saprissa, where he won four national championships and two CONCACAF Champions Cup, in 1993 and 1995. He scored a total of 40 goals for Saprissa. He also played for Municipal Pérez Zeledón and FC Seoul of the South Korean K League 1, then known as LG Cheetahs, whom he joined when his father Luis Gerardo Campos was the Costa Rican consul in South Korea.

== International career ==
Campos made his debut for Costa Rica in a September 1997 FIFA World Cup qualification match against the USA and collected a total of 20 caps, scoring no goals. He has represented his country in five FIFA World Cup qualification matches and played at the 1999 UNCAF Nations Cup as well as at the 2000 CONCACAF Gold Cup.

His final international was a January 2001 FIFA World Cup qualification match against Guatemala.

== Managerial career ==
After retiring from professional football, Campos was appointed as Football Operations Manager in Saprissa, during the years that Hernán Medford was head coach, and played a very important role in the achievements accomplished by Saprissa during that period, such as two national tournaments, the Uncaf Cup and the CONCACAF Champions Cup, giving them the right to compete in the 2005 FIFA Club World Championship in Japan, in which Saprissa finished third. When Medford and his coaching staff were announced by the Federación Costarricense de Fútbol as the new coaches for the Costa Rica national team, Campos was named by Saprissa as their new head coach and has since then, against all expectations, led his team to win both legs of the 2007–08 Championship earning it the Champion title without the need of a final.

Later he led the squad to three more consecutive national championships (make it fourth in a row) in the years 2007–08. He was fired in November 2009. In February 2010, he signed with 2009 Puerto Rico Soccer League Champions Bayamón to help the club qualify for the CONCACAF Champions League. Later he became manager of Pérez Zeledón and in August 2011, he was appointed head Coach for the Puerto Rico national football team. He is also activating and assuming charge of the U-15, U-17 and U-20 selections despite still being contracted to Pérez Zeledón who went to FIFA to claim a financial compensation.

In January 2014 Campos was named sporting director at Saprissa and in September 2014 replaced manager Rónald González to take charge of the team.

On March 28, 2023, Campos was fired from the position of coach of Deportivo Saprissa due to alleged racist comments towards one of the team's players, Javon East.
