= Julio Girón =

Guatemalan footballer

Personal information
- Full name: Julio Estuardo Girón Rafael
- Date of birth: March 2, 1970 (age 56)
- Place of birth: Guatemala City, Guatemala
- Height: 1.77 m (5 ft 9 1/2 in)
- Position: Midfielder

Senior career*
| Years | Team | Apps | (Gls) |
| 1990–1998 | Aurora F.C. | | |
| 1998–2007 | CSD Municipal | 91 | (2) |
| 2007–2008 | Deportivo Petapa | | |

International career^{‡}
| 1992–2006 | Guatemala | 82 | (0) |
- * Club domestic league appearances and goals as of 1 June 2007 ‡ National team caps and goals as of 5 November 2008

Julio Estuardo Girón Rafael (born March 2, 1970) is a retired Guatemalan football midfielder. He played several years for Aurora F.C. and CSD Municipal before retiring at Deportivo Petapa in January 2008.

== International career ==
Girón made his debut for Guatemala in a June 1992 friendly match against Nicaragua and played in three different World Cup qualification campaigns.

He earned 82 caps, in which he never scored a goal. In 1999, he became Guatemala's most capped player of all time, before he was surpassed by Edgar Estrada three years later. His final international game was a February 2006 friendly match against the United States.
