= Reynaldo Clavasquín =

Honduran footballer and manager (born 1972)

Personal information
- Full name: José Reynaldo Clavasquín Bejarano
- Date of birth: 28 January 1972 (age 54)
- Place of birth: Puerto Cortés, Honduras
- Position: Defender

Senior career*
Years	Team	Apps	(Gls)
1992–1997	Platense	126	(6)
1998–2000	Motagua	104	(15)
2000	Dundee United	0	(0)
2001	BSV Bad Bleiberg	12	(1)
2001–2004	Real España		

International career
1999–2001	Honduras	35	(3)

Managerial career
- 2008: Motagua
- 2011: Honduras
- 2012–2013: Motagua
- 2013: Motagua (assistant)
- 2013: Valle
- 2014–2016: Motagua II
- 2016–2017: Platense
- 2018: Valle
- 2019: Honduras Progreso
- * Club domestic league appearances and goals

José Reynaldo Clavasquín Bejarano (born 28 January 1972) is a Honduran football manager and former player. He played as a defender.

== Club career ==
Clavasquín started his career at hometown club Platense before joining F.C. Motagua in 1998 before the start of the 1998 Clausura. He scored the 1998 Clausura golden goal against Olimpia from a free-kick to make Motagua champions after a 13-year wait. He scored in the 1999/2000 Final.

In September 2000 he went abroad to play for Scottish Premier League side Dundee United but left the club citing personal reasons in October 2000.

He then moved to the Austrian Second Division outfit BSV Bad Bleiberg, where he lined up alongside compatriots Juan Manuel Cárcamo and Francisco Pavón.

== International career ==
Clavasquín made his debut for Honduras in a March 1999 UNCAF Nations Cup match against Belize and has earned a total of 35 caps, scoring 3 goals. He has represented his country in 17 FIFA World Cup qualification matches and played at the 1999 UNCAF Nations Cup as well as at the 2000 CONCACAF Gold Cup.

His final international was a November 2001 FIFA World Cup qualification against Mexico.

== Managerial career ==
Clavasquín retired in 2006 and became assistant manager of F.C. Motagua and in his first season he became champion. In October 2012 he made his debut as head coach of Motagua after the departure of Mexican coach José Treviño. In March 2013, he resigned from his position and instead continued as the assistant manager of the team.

He was appointed by Valle in summer 2013.

In the summer 2014 F.C. Motagua announced, that Clavasquín had returned to the club and would be the manager of their reserve team. He was in charge of the team until May 2016, where he became the manager of Platense FC.

In January 2018, Clavasquín was once again appointed as manager of Valle.

On 18 February 2019, Clavasquín was appointed as manager of C.D. Honduras Progreso. After poor results in the last matches and the club on the verge of relegation, he decided to resign already on 11 April 2019.

== Career statistics ==
Scores and results list Honduras' goal tally first.

N.	Date	Venue	Opponent	Score	Result	Competition
1.	26 March 1999	Estadio Nacional, San José, Costa Rica	Costa Rica	1–0	2–1	1999 UNCAF Nations Cup
2.	17 November 1999	Imperio del Sol Naciente, Tegucigalpa, Honduras	Trinidad and Tobago	2–1	3–2	Friendly match
3.	19 February 2000	Orange Bowl, Miami, United States	Peru	1–2	3–5	2000 CONCACAF Gold Cup
