= List of Central American football champions =

The CONCACAF Central American Cup is the top regional tournament for clubs from Central America. Although, this tournament was first contested in 2023, multiple different former competitions have been played before to crown a regional champion. The official competitions that grant this title are the CONCACAF Champions Cup qualification stage (1964–1991), the UNCAF Interclub Cup (1999–2007) and the already mentioned CONCACAF Central American Cup (2023–present). Several clubs have also won the CONCACAF Champions Cup, the CONCACAF League and the CONCACAF Cup Winners Cup, however, these tournaments, although officials, also included teams from other regions from CONCACAF outside of Central America, therefore, not added to this list. There were other non-official tournaments played during the 1970s, 1980s and 1990s, such as the Copa Fraternidad and the Torneo Grandes de Centro América, being the most prominents.

== Winners ==
Year	Winners (number of titles)	Runners-up
CONCACAF Champions Cup qualifying stage (1964–1998)
1964	(Costa Rica) Uruguay (1)	(Guatemala) Municipal
1965	(Costa Rica) Saprissa (1)	(El Salvador) Águila
1966	Not held	
1967	(El Salvador) Alianza (1)	(Guatemala) Aurora
1968	(Guatemala) Aurora (1)	(Honduras) Olimpia
1969	No proper Central American stage programed; all rounds mixed with northern and/or Caribbean clubs	
1970	(Costa Rica) Saprissa (2)	(Honduras) Olimpia
1971	Central American stage for qualifying purposes only; no final programed. Both Comunicaciones (GUA) and Alajuelense (CRC) advanced to further stage	
1972	No proper Central American stage programed; all rounds mixed with northern and/or Caribbean clubs	
1973	(Costa Rica) Saprissa (3)	(Costa Rica) Alajuelense
1974	(Guatemala) Municipal (1)	(El Salvador) Alianza
1975	(Costa Rica) Saprissa (4)	(Guatemala) Municipal
1976	(El Salvador) Águila (1)	(Nicaragua) Diriangén
1977	(Costa Rica) Saprissa (5)	(Guatemala) Municipal
1978	(Guatemala) Comunicaciones (1)	(Costa Rica) Saprissa
1979	(El Salvador) FAS (1)	(Costa Rica) Cartaginés (withdrew)
1980	(Honduras) Universidad (1)	(Honduras) Marathón
1981–1985	No proper Central American stage programed; all rounds mixed with northern and/or Caribbean clubs	
1986	Central American stage for qualifying purposes only; no final programed. Both Alajuelense (CRC) and Motagua (HON) advanced to further stage	
1987	(Honduras) Olimpia (1)	(Costa Rica) Saprissa
1988	(Costa Rica) Alajuelense (1)	(Honduras) Olimpia
1989	(Honduras) Olimpia (2)	(Costa Rica) Herediano
1990	(Honduras) Olimpia (3)	(El Salvador) Luis Ángel Firpo
1991	(Honduras) Real España (1)	(Costa Rica) Saprissa
1992–1996	No proper Central American stage programed; all rounds mixed with northern and/or Caribbean clubs	
1997	Central American stage for qualifying purposes only; no final programed. All Comunicaciones (GUA), Luis Ángel Firpo (SLV) and Cartaginés (CRC) advanced to further stage	
1998	Central American stage for qualifying purposes only; no final programed. All Saprissa (CRC), Luis Ángel Firpo (SLV) and Alajuelense (CRC) advanced to further stage	
2008–2017	No proper Central American stage programed; all Central American clubs qualified through their domestic leagues and the CONCACAF League on-forward	
UNCAF Interclub Cup (1999–2007)
1999	(Honduras) Olimpia (4)	(Costa Rica) Alajuelense
2000	(Honduras) Olimpia (5)	(Costa Rica) Alajuelense
2001	(Guatemala) Municipal (2)	(Costa Rica) Saprissa
2002	(Costa Rica) Alajuelense (2)	(Panama) Árabe Unido
2003	(Costa Rica) Saprissa (6)	(Guatemala) Comunicaciones
2004	(Guatemala) Municipal (3)	(Costa Rica) Saprissa
2005	(Costa Rica) Alajuelense (3)	(Honduras) Olimpia
2006	(Costa Rica) Puntarenas (1)	(Honduras) Olimpia
2007	(Honduras) Motagua (1)	(Costa Rica) Saprissa
CONCACAF Central American Cup (2023–)
2023	(Costa Rica) Alajuelense (4)	(Nicaragua) Real Estelí
2024	(Costa Rica) Alajuelense (5)	(Nicaragua) Real Estelí
2025	(Costa Rica) Alajuelense (6)	(Guatemala) Xelajú

== Other versions ==
The CONCACAF League was a second-tier competition organized by CONCACAF between 2017 and 2022 which served as a method of qualification to the CONCACAF Champions League. The tournament was open to Central American, Caribbean and Canadian clubs, however more than 80% of the berths in each tournament were allocated to Central American clubs. Although not officially a regional tournament, in the Central American lore, the winners of this cup have been considered "Central American champions"; even more because after all editions, all winners and finalists happened to be from Central America.

Year	Winners (number of titles)	Runners-up
CONCACAF League (2017–2022)
2017	(Honduras) Olimpia (1)	(Costa Rica) Santos de Guápiles
2018	(Costa Rica) Herediano (1)	(Honduras) Motagua
2019	(Costa Rica) Saprissa (1)	(Honduras) Motagua
2020	(Costa Rica) Alajuelense (1)	(Costa Rica) Saprissa
2021	(Guatemala) Comunicaciones (1)	(Honduras) Motagua
2022	(Honduras) Olimpia (2)	(Costa Rica) Alajuelense

== Non-official competitions ==
These tournaments were exhibition association football cups played between Central American clubs, not necessarily by the domestic cup or league holders, but more often by invitation.

Year	Winners (number of titles)	Runners-up
Championship of Central America and the Caribbean (1961)
1961	(Costa Rica) Alajuelense (1)	(El Salvador) Águila
Copa Fraternidad (1971–1984)
1971	(Guatemala) Comunicaciones (1)	(Costa Rica) Saprissa
1972	(Costa Rica) Saprissa (1)	(Guatemala) Aurora
1973	(Costa Rica) Saprissa (2)	(El Salvador) Águila
1974	(Guatemala) Municipal (1)	(Costa Rica) Saprissa
1975	(El Salvador) Platense (1)	(Guatemala) Aurora
1976	(Guatemala) Aurora (1)	(Guatemala) Comunicaciones
1977	(Guatemala) Municipal (2)	(Guatemala) Comunicaciones
1978	(Costa Rica) Saprissa (3)	(Costa Rica) Cartaginés
1979	(Guatemala) Aurora (2)	(Honduras) Real España
1980	(Honduras) Broncos (1)	(El Salvador) Alianza
1981	(Honduras) Real España (1)	(Honduras) Olimpia
1982	(Honduras) Real España (2)	(Guatemala) Xelajú
1983	(Guatemala) Comunicaciones (2)	(Guatemala) Aurora
1984	Final round abandoned	
Torneo Grandes de Centro América (1996–1998)
1996	(Costa Rica) Alajuelense (1)	(Costa Rica) Saprissa
1997	(El Salvador) Alianza (1)	(Costa Rica) Saprissa
1997–98	(Costa Rica) Saprissa (1)	(Guatemala) Municipal
Copa Premier Centroamericana (2019)
2019–20	(Honduras) Real España (1)	(Honduras) Olimpia

== Titles by club ==
Club	Titles	Winning years
Official only (Includes CONCACAF League)
(Costa Rica) Saprissa	7	1965, 1970, 1973, 1975, 1977, 2003, 2019
(Honduras) Olimpia	7	1987, 1989, 1990, 1999, 2000, 2017, 2022
(Costa Rica) Alajuelense	7	1988, 2002, 2005, 2020, 2023, 2024, 2025
(Guatemala) Municipal	3	1974, 2001, 2004
(Guatemala) Comunicaciones	2	1978, 2021
(Costa Rica) Uruguay	1	1964
(El Salvador) Alianza	1	1967
(Guatemala) Aurora	1	1968
(El Salvador) Águila	1	1976
(El Salvador) FAS	1	1979
(Honduras) Universidad	1	1980
(Honduras) Real España	1	1991
(Costa Rica) Puntarenas	1	2006
(Honduras) Motagua	1	2007
(Costa Rica) Herediano	1	2018
Including non-officials
(Costa Rica) Saprissa	11	1965, 1970, 1972, 1973, 1973, 1975, 1977, 1978, 1997–98, 2003, 2019
(Costa Rica) Alajuelense	9	1961, 1988, 1996, 2002, 2005, 2020, 2023, 2024, 2025
(Honduras) Olimpia	7	1987, 1989, 1990, 1999, 2000, 2017, 2022
(Guatemala) Municipal	5	1974, 1974, 1977, 2001, 2004
(Honduras) Real España	4	1981, 1982, 1991, 2019–20
(Guatemala) Comunicaciones	4	1971, 1978, 1983, 2021
(Guatemala) Aurora	3	1968, 1976, 1979
(El Salvador) Alianza	2	1967, 1997
(Costa Rica) Uruguay	1	1964
(El Salvador) Platense	1	1975
(El Salvador) Águila	1	1976
(El Salvador) FAS	1	1979
(Honduras) Universidad	1	1980
(Honduras) Broncos	1	1980
(Costa Rica) Puntarenas	1	2006
(Honduras) Motagua	1	2007
(Costa Rica) Herediano	1	2018

== See also ==
- CONCACAF Central American Cup
- UNCAF Interclub Cup
