= 1999 UNCAF Interclub Cup =

Tournament details
- Dates: 17 February – 29 August
- Teams: 11 (from 6 associations)

Final positions
- Champions: (Honduras) Olimpia (2nd title)
- Runners-up: (Costa Rica) Alajuelense
- Third place: (Costa Rica) Saprissa
- Fourth place: (Guatemala) Comunicaciones

Tournament statistics
- Matches played: 46
- Goals scored: 125 (2.72 per match)

The 1999 UNCAF Interclub Cup was the 17th edition of the Central American Club Championship, and the first under the name UNCAF Interclub Cup. The tournament was organized by UNCAF, the football regional body in Central America.

Honduran club Olimpia defeated Costa Rican sides Alajuelense and Saprissa (defending champions) and Guatemalan Comunicaciones in the final round to win their second tournament in team's history. The first three ranked earned the right to play at the 1999 CONCACAF Champions' Cup.

== Teams ==
For the first time in competition history, Belizean and Nicaraguan clubs entered the tournament.

Association	Team	Qualifying method	App.	Previous best
Belize	Juventus	1997–98 Champions	1st	—
Belize	Real Verdes	1998 Runners-up	1st	—
(Costa Rica) Costa Rica	Saprissa	1997–98 Champions	13th	Champions (1972, 1973, 1978, 1998)
(Costa Rica) Costa Rica	Alajuelense	1997–98 Runners-up	5th	Champions (1996)
(El Salvador) El Salvador	Luis Ángel Firpo	1997–98 Champions	1st	—
(El Salvador) El Salvador	FAS	1997–98 Runners-up	6th	3rd (1980)
Guatemala	Comunicaciones	1997–98 Champions	16th	Champions (1971, 1983)
Guatemala	Aurora	1997–98 Runners-up	11th	Champions (1976, 1979)
Honduras	Motagua	1997–98 Champions	4th	Group stage (1979, 1997, 1998)
Honduras	Olimpia	1997–98 Runners-up	5th	Champions (1981)
Nicaragua	Walter Ferretti	1997–98 Champions	1st	—

== First round ==
=== Group 1 ===
Pos	Team	Pld	W	D	L	GF	GA	GD	Pts	Qualification
1	(Guatemala) Comunicaciones	7	4	3	0	12	3	+9	15	Qualification for Final Round
2	(Costa Rica) Saprissa	7	3	3	1	10	5	+5	12	Qualification for Final Round
3	(El Salvador) Luis Ángel Firpo	8	2	2	4	7	13	−6	8	
4	(Honduras) Motagua	7	1	4	2	4	6	−2	7	
5	(Belize) Juventus	7	1	2	4	5	11	−6	5	

17 February 1999	Luis Ángel Firpo (El Salvador)	2–2	(Costa Rica) Saprissa	Usulután, El Salvador
	Rodríguez 27' 70'		16' Centeno; 59' Saraiva	Stadium: Sergio Torres Stadium

21 February 1999	Juventus (Belize)	0–0	(Honduras) Motagua	Orange Walk Town, Belize
				Stadium: Orange Walk People's Stadium

24 February 1999	Comunicaciones (Guatemala)	2–0	(Belize) Juventus	Guatemala City, Guatemala
	Westphal 35'; Gómez 60'			Stadium: Estadio Doroteo Guamuch Flores

24 February 1999	Motagua (Honduras)	2–1	(El Salvador) Luis Ángel Firpo	Tegucigalpa, Honduras
	Reyes 22'; Clavasquín 24'		4' Rodríguez	Stadium: Estadio Nacional Chelato Uclés

3 March 1999	Luis Ángel Firpo (El Salvador)	1–1	(Guatemala) Comunicaciones	Usulután, El Salvador
	Rodríguez 26'		19' Fonseca	Stadium: Sergio Torres Stadium

3 March 1999	Motagua (Honduras)	1–1	(Costa Rica) Saprissa	Tegucigalpa, Honduras
	Ramírez 6'		71' (pen.) Saraiva	Stadium: Estadio Tiburcio Carías Andino

7 April 1999	Luis Ángel Firpo (El Salvador)	2–0	(Belize) Juventus	Usulután, El Salvador
	Alfredo Perez; Raul Toro			Stadium: Sergio Torres Stadium

7 April 1999	Saprissa (Costa Rica)	1–1	(Guatemala) Comunicaciones	San José, Costa Rica
	Saraiva 69' (pen.)		76' Acosta	Stadium: Estadio Ricardo Saprissa Aymá

19 May 1999	Comunicaciones (Guatemala)	0–0	(Honduras) Motagua	Guatemala City, Guatemala
				Stadium: Estadio Doroteo Guamuch Flores

23 May 1999	Juventus (Belize)	0–2	(Costa Rica) Saprissa	Orange Walk Town, Belize
			20' Campos; 61' Bryce	Stadium: Orange Walk People's Stadium

18 July 1999	Motagua (Honduras)	1–1	(Belize) Juventus	Tegucigalpa, Honduras
	Clavasquín		Flowers	Stadium: Estadio Tiburcio Carías Andino

21 July 1999	Saprissa (Costa Rica)	2–0	(El Salvador) Luis Ángel Firpo	San Juan de Tibás, Costa Rica
				Stadium: Estadio Ricardo Saprissa Aymá

25 July 1999	Luis Ángel Firpo (El Salvador)	1–0	(Honduras) Motagua	Usulután, El Salvador
	Celio Rodriguez 60'		Nil	Stadium: Sergio Torres Stadium

25 July 1999	Juventus (Belize)	1–4	(Guatemala) Comunicaciones	Orange Walk Town, Belize
	Goal		Julio Rodas	Stadium: Orange Walk People's Stadium

1 August 1999	Saprissa (Costa Rica)	2–0	(Honduras) Motagua	San José, Costa Rica
	W. Centeno 50'; E. Centeno 77'		Nil	Stadium: Estadio Ricardo Saprissa Aymá

1 August 1999	Comunicaciones (Guatemala)	3–0	(El Salvador) Luis Ángel Firpo	Guatemala City, Guatemala
	Oviedo; González		Nil	Stadium: Estadio Mateo Flores

8 August 1999	Comunicaciones (Guatemala)	1–0	(Costa Rica) Saprissa	Guatemala City, Guatemala
	Goal		Nil	Stadium: Estadio Mateo Flores

15 August 1999	Juventus (Belize)	3–0	(El Salvador) Luis Ángel Firpo	Orange Walk Town, Belize
				Stadium: Orange Walk People's Stadium
Note: Luis Ángel Firpo didn't show. Awarded 3–0 to Juventus

Saprissa (Costa Rica)	v	(Belize) Juventus	San José, Costa Rica
			Stadium: Estadio Ricardo Saprissa Aymá
Note: Game cancelled due to irrelevance.

Motagua (Honduras)	v	(Guatemala) Comunicaciones	Tegucigalpa, Honduras
			Stadium: Estadio Tiburcio Carías Andino
Note: Game cancelled due to irrelevance.

=== Group 2 ===
Pos	Team	Pld	W	D	L	GF	GA	GD	Pts	Qualification
1	(Honduras) Olimpia	8	5	3	0	13	5	+8	18	Qualification for Final Round
2	(Costa Rica) Alajuelense	8	3	4	1	20	10	+10	13	Qualification for Final Round
3	(Guatemala) Aurora	8	3	3	2	21	13	+8	12	
4	(El Salvador) FAS	8	3	2	3	12	9	+3	11	
5	(Nicaragua) Walter Ferretti	3	2	0	1	3	9	−6	6	
6	(Belize) Real Verdes	9	0	0	9	3	26	−23	0	

1999-02-17

Alajuelense (Costa Rica)	6 – 1	(Guatemala) Aurora
Johnny Cubero x 4, David Diach, Geovanny Hidalgo		Danny Aguilar

Estadio Alejandro Morera Soto, Alajuela

1999-02-17

FAS (El Salvador)	0 – 1	(Honduras) Olimpia
		Denilson Costa

Estadio Óscar Quiteño, Santa Ana

1999-02-21

Walter Ferretti (Nicaragua)	1 – 0	(Belize) Real Verdes
Henry De Jesus Urbina

Dennis Martínez National Stadium, Managua

1999-02-24

Olimpia (Honduras)	0 – 0	(Guatemala) Aurora

Estadio Tiburcio Carías Andino, Tegucigalpa

1999-02-28

Real Verdes (Belize)	1 – 2	(Costa Rica) Alajuelense
David McCauley		Alexánder Castro; Luis José Herra

Norman Broaster Stadium, San Ignacio

1999-02-28

Walter Ferretti (Nicaragua)	2 – 1	(El Salvador) FAS
José María Bermúdez 71pen Armando Astorga 84		Miguel Mariano 35

Dennis Martínez National Stadium, Managua

1999-03-07

Alajuelense (Costa Rica)	1 – 1	(Honduras) Olimpia
Wilson Muñoz 19		Enrique Reneau 60

Estadio Alejandro Morera Soto, Alajuela

1999-03-07

Aurora (Guatemala)	8 – 0	(Nicaragua) Walter Ferretti
Dionel Bordón 12; Diego Rosa 19, 23, 38; Andrés Rivera 66; Danny Aguilar 75, 88; Ricardo Gutiérrez 79

Estadio del Ejército, Guatemala City

1999-03-07

FAS (El Salvador)	2 – 1	(Belize) Real Verdes
Miguel Mariano; Marlon Medrano		David McCauley

Estadio Óscar Quiteño, Santa Ana

1999-04-11

Real Verdes (Belize)	1 – 3	(Guatemala) Aurora
David McCauley		Guillermo Almada; Danny Aguilar; Guillermo Almada

Norman Broaster Stadium, San Ignacio

1999-04-11

FAS (El Salvador)	1 – 1	(Costa Rica) Alajuelense
Miguel Mariano 62		Hárold Miranda 33

Estadio Óscar Quiteño Santa Ana

1999-04-11

Olimpia (Honduras)	canceled	(Nicaragua) Walter Ferretti

Estadio Tiburcio Carías Andino, Tegucigalpa

1999-05-17

Olimpia (Honduras)	2 – 0	(Belize) Real Verdes
Marlon Hernández 40; David Suazo 78

Estadio Tiburcio Carías Andino, Tegucigalpa

1999-05-19

Aurora (Guatemala)	1 – 3	(El Salvador) FAS
Luis Pérez 31		Vladimir Cubias 14; Marlon Medrano 18, 3

Estadio del Ejército, Guatemala City

1999-05-19

Alajuelense (Costa Rica)	canceled	(Nicaragua) Walter Ferretti

Estadio Alejandro Morera Soto, Alajuela

1999-07-21

Olimpia (Honduras)	2 – 1	(El Salvador) FAS
Arnold Cruz 45pen Denilson Costa 76		Oscar Martínez 61

Estadio Tiburcio Carías Andino, Tegucigalpa

1999-07-21

Aurora (Guatemala)	1 – 1	(Costa Rica) Alajuelense

Estadio del Ejército, Guatemala City

1999-07-21

Real Verdes (Belize)	canceled	(Nicaragua) Walter Ferretti

Norman Broaster Stadium, San Ignacio

1999-07-25

Aurora (Guatemala)	2 – 2	(Honduras) Olimpia
Diego De Rosa 8, 22		Rodiney Martins 40; Arnold Cruz 78pen

Estadio del Ejército, Guatemala City

1999-07-25

Alajuelense (Costa Rica)	7 – 0	(Belize) Real Verdes

Estadio Alejandro Morera Soto, Alajuela

1999-07-25

FAS (El Salvador)	canceled	(Nicaragua) Walter Ferretti

Estadio Óscar Quiteño, Santa Ana

1999-08-01

Olimpia (Honduras)	4 – 1	(Costa Rica) Alajuelense
Rodiney Martins 21; Enrique Reneau 37; Alex Pineda 74; Denilson Costa 85		Josef Miso 70pen

Estadio Tiburcio Carías Andino, Tegucigalpa

1999-08-01

Real Verdes (Belize)	0 – 3	(El Salvador) FAS

Norman Broaster Stadium, San Ignacio

1999-08-01

Walter Ferretti (Nicaragua)	canceled	(Guatemala) Aurora

Dennis Martínez National Stadium, Managua

1999-08-08

FAS (El Salvador)	1 – 1	(Costa Rica) Alajuelense

Estadio Óscar Quiteño, Santa Ana

1999-08-08

Aurora (Guatemala)	5 – 0	(Belize) Real Verdes

Estadio del Ejército, Guatemala City

1999-08-08

Walter Ferretti (Nicaragua)	canceled	(Honduras) Olimpia

Dennis Martínez National Stadium, Managua

1999-08-15

Real Verdes (Belize)	0 – 1	(Honduras) Olimpia

Norman Broaster Stadium, San Ignacio

1999-08-15

FAS (El Salvador)	canceled	(Guatemala) Aurora

Estadio Óscar Quiteño, Santa Ana

1999-08-15

Walter Ferretti (Nicaragua)	canceled	(Costa Rica) Alajuelense

Dennis Martínez National Stadium, Managua

Notes:

- Walter Ferretti withdrew for financial reasons. The results of Walter Ferretti's games have been voided and do not count towards the group rankings.

== Final round ==
=== Final group ===
Pos	Team	Pld	W	D	L	GF	GA	GD	Pts	Qualification
1	(Honduras) Olimpia (C, Q)	3	3	0	0	6	1	+5	9	Qualification for CONCACAF Champions' Cup 1999
2	(Costa Rica) Alajuelense (Q)	3	1	1	1	3	2	+1	4	Qualification for CONCACAF Champions' Cup 1999
3	(Costa Rica) Saprissa (Q)	3	1	1	1	3	3	0	4	Qualification for CONCACAF Champions' Cup 1999
4	(Guatemala) Comunicaciones	3	0	0	3	3	9	−6	0	

(C) Champions; (Q) Qualified for the phase indicated
1999-08-25

Comunicaciones (Guatemala)	2 – 3	(Costa Rica) Saprissa

Estadio Tiburcio Carías Andino, Tegucigalpa

1999-08-25

Olimpia (Honduras)	2 – 0	(Costa Rica) Alajuelense
Wilmer Velasquez 8' 38'		Nil

Estadio Tiburcio Carías Andino, Tegucigalpa

1999-08-27

Alajuelense (Costa Rica)	0 – 0	(Costa Rica) Saprissa
Nil		Nil

Estadio Tiburcio Carías Andino, Tegucigalpa

1999-08-27

Olimpia (Honduras)	3 – 1	(Guatemala) Comunicaciones
Wilmer Velasquez 31' 61'; Alex Pineda 76'		Allan Oviedo 85'

Estadio Tiburcio Carías Andino, Tegucigalpa

1999-08-29

Alajuelense (Costa Rica)	3 – 0	(Guatemala) Comunicaciones
		Nil

Estadio Tiburcio Carías Andino, Tegucigalpa

1999-08-29

Olimpia (Honduras)	1 – 0	(Costa Rica) Saprissa
Wilmer Velasquez 59'		Nil

Estadio Tiburcio Carías Andino, Tegucigalpa

Olimpia, Alajuelense, and Saprissa qualify to 1999 CONCACAF Champions' Cup

1999 Copa Interclubes UNCAF champions

2nd title
