= List of C.D. FAS records and statistics =

This article lists various statistics related to Club Deportivo FAS.

All stats accurate as of 2 April 2022.

== Honours ==
As of 18 May 2022 FAS have won 18 Primera División and one CONCACAF Champions League trophies.

=== Domestic competitions ===
==== League ====
Primera División de Fútbol de El Salvador and predecessors

  - Champions (18): 1951–1952, 1953–1954, 1957–1958, 1961–1962, 1962, 1977–1978, 1978–1979, 1981, 1984, 1994–1995, 1995–1996, Clausura 2002, Apertura 2002, Apertura 2003, Apertura 2004, Clausura 2005, Apertura 2009. Clausura 2021 (record)

==== Minor Cups ====
- Copa LG Electonics
  - Runners up (1) : 1999
- American Airlines Cup
  - Champions (1) : 2002
- Copa Salvadorean Classic Soccer Challenge
  - Runners up (1) : 2014
- EDESSA Independence Cup
  - Runners up (1) : 2014

=== CONCACAF competitions ===
==== Official titles ====
- CONCACAF Champions League and predecessors
  - Champions (1) : 1979
- Copa Interamericana
  - Runners up (1) : 1979
- UNCAF Club Championship
  - Runners up (1) : 1980

== Individual awards ==
=== Award winners ===
Top Goalscorer (10)

The following players have won the Goalscorer titles while playing for FAS:

- (Argentina) Omar Muraco (39) – 1957-58
- (Argentina) Hector Dadderio (29) – 1959
- (El Salvador) Mario Monge (16) – 1961–62
- (El Salvador) David Arnoldo Cabrera (20) – 1981
- (El Salvador) David Arnoldo Cabrera (16) – 1983
- (El Salvador) Ever Hernandez (17) – 1984
- (El Salvador) (Honduras) Williams Reyes (14) – Clausura 2004
- (Panama) (El Salvador) Nicolás Muñoz (12) – Apertura 2004
- (Paraguay) Néstor Ayala (12) – Apertura 2006
- (El Salvador) (Honduras) Williams Reyes (11) – 2009 Apertura
- (Colombia) Luis Perea (14) – Clausura 2018
- (Colombia) Bladimir Diaz (9) – Clausura 2022

== Goalscorers ==
- Most goals scored : **240** – David Arnoldo Cabrera
- Most League goals: **TBD** –
- Most League goals in a season: **26** – Omar Muraco, Primera División, 1958
- Most goals scored by a FAS player in a match: **6** – David Arnoldo Cabrera v. UES (FAS 7-2 UES), 3 January 1980
- Most goals scored by a FAS player in an International match: **4** – Alejandro de la Cruz Bentos & Williams Reyes v. Jalapa, 11 October 2002
- Most goals scored in CONCACAF competition: **13** – tbd, tbd

=== All-time top goalscorers ===
No.	Player	period	Goals
1	(El Salvador) David Arnoldo Cabrera	1967–1987	240
2	(Honduras) (El Salvador) Williams Reyes	2000–2005, 2009–2013	139
3	(Argentina) Alejandro de la Cruz Bentos	2001–2008, 2009–2015	101
4	(El Salvador) Jorge "Mágico" González	1977–1982, 1991–1999	73
5	(Argentina) Raul Roberto Cassadei	1975–1980	71
6	(El Salvador) Carlos Eduardo "Monito" Pineda Moreno (†)	1947–1961	67
7	(El Salvador) Ricardo "Chilenito" Valencia (†)	1949–1959	62
8	(El Salvador) Guillermo Rivera	1988–1998	58
9	(Brazil) Odir Jaques	1967–1970	49
10	(El Salvador) Elmer Acevedo (†)	1966–1970	47

Note: Players in bold text are still active with Club Deportivo FAS.

==== Historical goals ====
Goal	Name	Date	Match
1st goal	(El Salvador) Carlos Eduardo "Monito" Pineda Moreno	June 1958	FAS 1 – Libertad 4
1st in Primera División	(El Salvador) Carlos Eduardo "Monito" Pineda Moreno	Day Month Year	FAS 2 – Juventud Olímpica 1
100th	(El Salvador) Jorge "Pirringa" Rivas	29 October 1950	FAS 7 – Olympic 3
500th	(El Salvador) Joel "Cacique" Estrada	5 November 1961	FAS 4 – Dragon 0
1000th	(Argentina) Domingo Albil † (1945-2024)	5 November 1972	Municipal Limeno 3 – FAS 1
1500th	(El Salvador) David Arnoldo Cabrera	22 June 1981	Once Lobos 1 – FAS 2
2000th	(El Salvador) William Renderos Iraheta	29 August 1993	Municipal Limeno 1 – FAS 1
2500th	(Uruguay) Alejandro Soler	13 May 2001	FAS 3 – Dragon 0
3000th	(Colombia) Luis Torres (Own Goal)	21 March 2009	FAS 2 – Vista Hermosa 1

kroeker

== Players ==
=== Appearances ===
Competitive, professional matches only including substitution, number of appearances as a substitute appears in brackets.

Last updated -

	Name	Years	Primera División	Finals	CCL	Total
1	(El Salvador) -	-	(-)	(-)	(-)	(-)
2	(El Salvador) -	-	(-)	(-)	(-)	(-)
3	(El Salvador) -	-	(-)	(-)	(-)	(-)
4	(El Salvador) -	-	(-)	(-)	(-)	(-)
5	(El Salvador) -	-	(-)	(-)	(-)	(-)
6	(El Salvador) -	-	(-)	(-)	(-)	(-)
7	(El Salvador) -	-	(-)	(-)	(-)	(-)
8	(El Salvador) -	-	(-)	(-)	(-)	(-)
9	(El Salvador) -	-	(-)	(-)	(-)	(-)
10	(El Salvador) -	-	(-)	(-)	(-)	(-)

==== Other appearances records ====
- Youngest first-team player: 17 years, 114 days – (El Salvador) TBD v TBD, Primera División, Day Month Year
- Oldest post-Second World War player: 38 years, 233 days – (El Salvador) TBD v TBD, Primera División, Day Month Year
- Most appearances in Primera División: TBD – (El Salvador) TBD
- Most appearances in Copa Presidente: TBD – (El Salvador) TBD
- Most appearances in International competitions: TBD – (El Salvador) TBD
- Most appearances in CONCACAF competitions: TBD – (El Salvador) TBD
- Most appearances in UNCAF competitions: TBD – (El Salvador) TBD
- Most appearances in CONCACAF Champions League: TBD – (El Salvador) TBD
- Most appearances in UNCAF Copa: TBD (El Salvador) TBD
- Most appearances in FIFA Club World Cup: 2

- (Brazil) Zózimo

- Most appearances as a foreign player in all competitions: TBD – (Brazil) TBD
- Most appearances as a foreign player in Primera División: TBD – (Brazil) TBD
- Most consecutive League appearances: TBD – (El Salvador) TBD – from Month Day, Year at Month Day, Year
- Shortest appearance: –

== Records ==
=== Scorelines ===
- Record League victory: 11–1 v Independiente, Primera División, 3 May 1959
- Record League victory (Apertura/Clausura): 8-0v Fuerte San Francisco, Apertura 2025, 27 July 2025
- Record League Defeat: 7-1 v Alianza F.C., Primera División, 29 October 1989
- Record Cup victory: TBD–TBD v TBD, Presidente Cup, TBD
- Record CONCACAF Championship Victory: 7–1 v Jong Colombia, 1979
- Record CONCACAF Championship defeat: 5–0 v Club Toluca, 2010–2011
- Record UNCAF Victory: 17–0 v Deportivo Jalapa, TBD, 11 October 2002
- Record UNCAF defeat: 3–0 v Real C.D. España, 1982

=== Sequences ===
- Most wins in a row: 11 Games, 1961 – 1962
- Most home wins in a row (all competitions): TBD, TBD– TBD
- Most home league wins in a row: TBD, TBD – TBD
- Most away wins in a row: TBD, TBD – TBD
- Most draws in a row: TBD, TBD
- Most home draws in a row: TBD, TBD
- Most away draws in a row: TBD, TBD
- Most defeats in a row: 8, TBD
- Most home defeats in a row: TBD, TBD
- Most away defeats in a row: TBD, TBD
- Longest unbeaten run: 33 games 1978-1979 Season
  18 games, 2003 Season
- Longest unbeaten run at home: TBD, TBD
- Longest unbeaten run away: TBD, TBD
- Longest winless run: TBD, TBD – TBD
- Longest winless run at home: TBD, TBD – TBD
- Longest winless run away: TBD, TBD – TBD

=== Seasonal ===
- Most goals in all competitions in a season: TBD – TBD
- Most League goals in a season: TBD – TBD
- Fewest league goals conceded in a season: 6 – 1981
- Most points in a season (): TBD – TBD, TBD
- Most points in a season (Apertura/Clausura): TBD -, TBD
- Most League wins in a season (): TBD – TBD
- Most League wins in a season (Apertura/Clausura): TBD – TBD
- Most home League wins in a season: TBD – TBD
- Most away League wins in a season: TBD – TBD

=== Internationals ===
- Most international caps (total while at club): Alfredo Pacheco – 86 (68) – El Salvador

=== Attendances ===
- Highest home attendance: TBD, TBD
- Highest away attendance: TBD v TBD, TBD, TBD, TBD

=== Other ===
- Most seasons appearance: 64, C.D. FAS (1948–present)
- First foreign coach that won a championship in El Salvador: Argentinian Alberto Cevasco with C.D. FAS in 1957–58.
- Most points in a season: 44 points, C.D. FAS (2003 Clausura)
- Most defeats in a final: 8, C.D. FAS (as of Apertura 2012)
- First Foreign Player to be signed by FAS: Costa Rican Ernesto Mora Varga, 1950–1951
- Game 100, FAS lost 4-1 leones (3 April 1955)
- Game 1000, FAS drew 0-0 Chalatenango (1 November 1987)
- The highest transfer fee received by the club for a player was $130,000 ($425,167.36 as of 2025), paid by Cádiz CF for Mágico González on 1983.
- The highest transfer fee paid by the club for a player was TBD, paid to TBD for TBD on TBD.

=== Overall seasons table in Primera División de Fútbol Profesional ===
Pos.	Club	Season In D1	Pl.	W	D	L	GS	GA	Dif.
TBA	C.D. FAS	TBD	2100	960	620	520	3351	2360	+991

Last updated: 21 October 2015

== Internationals ==
The following players represented their countries while playing for FAS (the figure in brackets is the number of caps gained while a FAS player. Many of these players also gained caps while at other clubs.) Figures for active players (in bold) last updated 2022

Argentina

- Agustín Balbuena

Costa Rica

- Donny Grant Zamora
- Allan Oviedo (1)
- Rodolfo Rodríguez
- José Luis Soto

El Salvador

- Gerson Mayen ()
- Elder José Figueroa (6)

Guatemala

- Pedro Segura
- Tomás Gamboa
- Roberto Montepeque
- Cristian Noriega
- Julio Rodas

Honduras

- Eduardo Arriola
- Belarmino Rivera
- Walter Martinez

Jamaica

- Wolde Harris

Mexico

- Carlos Peña

Nicaragua

- Rodolfo Orellana Castro (Fito Castro)

Panama

- Roberto Brown
- Roberto Chen
- Nicolás Muñoz
- Orlando Rodríguez
- Joel Solanilla

Paraguay

- Néstor Ayala

Peru

- Fernando Alva
- Agustín Castillo
- Antonio Serrano

United States

- Hugo Perez ()
- David Quezada

=== Record versus other clubs ===
As of 2015-03-15

The Concacaf opponents below = Official tournament results: (Plus a sampling of other results)

Opponent	Last Meeting	G	W	D	L	F	A	PTS	+/-
(Mexico) Club León	1952 Friendly	1	0	0	1	0	2	0	-2
(Brazil) Botafogo	1958 Friendly	1	0	0	1	0	3	0	-3
(Spain) Barcelona F.C.	1962 Friendly	1	0	0	1	0	4	0	-4
(Mexico) Club Oro	1963 Friendly	2	0	0	2	0	7	0	-7
(Costa Rica) Orión F.C.	1964 Friendly	1	1	0	0	1	0	3	+1
(Guatemala) Aurora FC	1999 UNCAF	2	1	1	0	4	2	4	+2
(Spain) Celta de Vigo	1985 Friendly	1	0	0	1	2	3	0	-1
(Peru) Alianza Lima	1988 Friendly	1	0	0	0	0	0	0	0
Universidad Católica de Chile	1989 Friendly	1	0	0	1	0	1	0	-1
(Argentina) Boca Juniors	2006 Friendly	1	0	1	0	2	2	1	0
(United States) New York Cosmos	2015 Friendly	1	1	0	0	1	0	3	+1
(Paraguay) Club Olimpia	1979–80 Copa Interamericana	3	0	1	2	4	9	1	-5
(Mexico) Club América	2003 CONCACAF Champions Cup	2	1	0	1	3	4	3	-1
(Mexico) C.F. Monterrey	2004 CONCACAF Champions Cup	2	0	1	1	1	4	1	-3
(Honduras) C.D.S. Vida	1985 CONCACAF Champions Cup	2	0	1	1	1	3	1	-2
(Mexico) UANL Tigres	1979 CONCACAF Champions Cup	2	1	1	0	1	0	4	+1
(Netherlands Antilles) Jong Colombia	1979 CONCACAF Champions Cup	2	2	0	0	8	2	3	+6
(Guatemala) Amatitlán	1997 Concacaf cup	2	0	2	0	2	2	2	0
(Guatemala) C.S.D. Comunicaciones	1997 UNCAF	10	1	4	5	10	17	7	-7
(Guatemala) Coban Imperial	1979 UNCAF	2	0	2	0	1	1	2	0
(El Salvador) Atlético Marte	1971 UNCAF	2	1	1	0	4	3	4	+1
(Costa Rica) C.S. Herediano	1978 UNCAF	2	1	1	0	2	0	4	+2
(Honduras) Broncos	1980 UNCAF	3	1	1	1	3	3	4	0
(Honduras) Real C.D. España	1982 UNCAF	4	1	0	3	1	6	3	-5
(Honduras) C.D. Marathón	1980 UNCAF	2	2	0	0	10	1	6	+9
(Honduras) Atlético Morazán	1982 UNCAF	2	1	1	0	3	2	4	+1
(Guatemala) Finanzas Industriales	1984 UNCAF	1	1	0	0	2	1	3	+1
(Guatemala) C.D. Suchitepéquez	1984 UNCAF	1	0	1	0	2	2	1	0
(Honduras) C.D. Olimpia	CONCACAF Champions league 2012–2013	7	2	0	5	7	14	6	-7
(Nicaragua) Deportivo Walter Ferretti	1999 UNCAF	1	0	0	1	1	2	0	-1
(Belize) Real Verdes	1999 UNCAF	2	2	0	0	5	1	6	+4
(Costa Rica) L.D. Alajuelense	1999 UNCAF	4	0	2	2	5	8	2	-3
(Panama) Arabe Unido	2018 CONCACAF League	5	2	1	2	8	5	7	+3
(Nicaragua) Deportivo Jalapa	2002 UNCAF	1	1	0	0	17	0	3	+17
(El Salvador) Alianza F.C.	2002 UNCAF	1	1	0	0	2	1	3	+1
(Nicaragua) Diriangén FC	2004 UNCAF	3	3	0	0	11	1	9	+10
(Costa Rica) Deportivo Saprissa	2005 UNCAF	8	0	3	5	4	12	3	-8
(Panama) Plaza Amador	2004 UNCAF	2	2	0	0	6	3	6	+3
(Guatemala) C.S.D. Municipal	2004 UNCAF	1	0	0	1	0	2	0	-2
(Nicaragua) Real Estelí F.C.	2003 UNCAF	1	1	0	0	2	1	3	+1
(Costa Rica) C.S. Cartaginés	1978 CONCACAF Champions cup	2	1	1	0	3	1	4	+2
(Guatemala) Xelajú MC	2010–2011 CONCACAF Champions league	2	1	1	0	3	1	4	+2
(Mexico) Toluca F.C.	2010–2011 CONCACAF Champions league	2	0	1	1	0	5	1	-5
Puerto Rico Islanders	2010–2011 CONCACAF Champions league	2	0	1	1	1	4	1	-3
(United States) Houston Dynamo	2012–2013 CONCACAF Champions league	2	0	0	2	1	7	0	-6
(Canada) Montreal Impact	2014–2015 CONCACAF Champions league	2	0	0	2	2	4	0	-2
(United States) New York Red Bulls	2014–2015 CONCACAF Champions league	2	0	1	1	0	2	1	-2
(Costa Rica) Pérez Zeledón	2018 CONCACAF League	2	1	1	0	3	2	4	+1
(Nicaragua) Managua F.C.	2020 CONCACAF League	1	0	1	0	1	1	1	0
Totals									

== Performance in CONCACAF competitions ==
- CONCACAF Cup Winners' Cup: 1 appearance

1997 : Qualifying stage (Central Zone)

- CONCACAF Champions' Cup: 12 appearances

Best: Champion in 1979
1963 : Round 1
1971 : Round 1
1978 : Round 2

- (gold) (1)::1979 : Champions

1984 : Round 1
1985 : Round 1
1988 : Round 2
1995 : Round 3
1996 : Round 1
1997 : Round 1
2003 : Round 1
2004 : Quarter-final

- CONCACAF Champions League: 3 appearances

Best: Group stage in 2010–11
2010–11 : Group stage
2012–13 : Group Stage
2014–15 : Group Stage

- CONCACAF League: 1 appearances

Best: Quarterfinal in 2018
2018 : Quarterfinal

- Copa Interclubes UNCAF: 8 appearances

Best: Third Place in 1980
1978 : Semi-final
1979 : Group Stage
1980 : Third Place
1982 : Semi-final
1999 : Group Stage
2002 : Group Stage
2003 : Group Stage
2004 : Fourth Place
2005 : First Round
