= 1997–98 Torneo Grandes de Centroamérica =

1998 Torneo Grandes de Centroamérica
Tournament details
- Dates: 29 October 1997 – 23 September 1998
- Teams: 9 (from 4 associations)

Final positions
- Champions: (Costa Rica) Saprissa (4th title)
- Runners-up: (Guatemala) Municipal

Tournament statistics
- Matches played: 28
- Goals scored: 50 (1.79 per match)

The 1998 Torneo Grandes de Centroamérica was the 16th edition of the UNCAF Club Tournament and the third and last under this name. Costa Rican Deportivo Saprissa obtained its 4th regional title.

== Teams ==
Association	Team	Qualifying method	App.	Previous best
(Costa Rica) Costa Rica	Saprissa	1996–97 Runners-up	12th	Champions (1972, 1973, 1978)
(Costa Rica) Costa Rica	Herediano	1996–97 Semifinalist	6th	3rd (1971, 1975)
(El Salvador) El Salvador	Águila	1996–97 Regular season winners	10th	Runners-up (1973)
Guatemala	Comunicaciones	1996–97 Champions	15th	Champions (1971, 1983)
Guatemala	Aurora	1996–97 Runners-up	10th	Champions (1976, 1979)
Guatemala	Municipal	1996–97 Third place	11th	Champions (1974, 1977)
Honduras	Olimpia	1996–97 Champions	4th	Champions (1981)
Honduras	Real España	Invitee	4th	Champions (1982)
Honduras	Motagua	Invitee	3rd	Group stage (1979, 1997)

== Qualifying ==
=== Honduras ===
Pos	Team	Pld	W	D	L	GF	GA	GD	Pts	Qualification or relegation
1	(Honduras) Olimpia	2	1	1	0	3	2	+1	4	Advance Final Tournament
2	(Honduras) Real España	2	0	2	0	3	3	0	2	Advance Final Tournament
3	(Honduras) Motagua	2	0	1	1	1	2	−1	1	Advance to Play-offs

Updated to match(es) played on 8 October 1997. Source: Diario Diez
Rules for classification: 1) points; 2) goal difference; 3) number of goals scored.

17 September 1997	Motagua (Honduras)	1–1	(Honduras) Real España
	Roberto Asprilla		Washington Hernández

1 October 1997	Olimpia (Honduras)	2–2	(Honduras) Real España
	Wilmer Velásquez 76' 78'		TBD; TBD

8 October 1997	Motagua (Honduras)	0–1	(Honduras) Olimpia	Tegucigalpa
19:30 CST	Nil		Wilmer Velásquez 55'	Stadium: Estadio Tiburcio Carías Andino; Referee: Nelson Cálix (HON)

=== Play-off ===
29 October 1997 1st leg	Motagua (Honduras)	0–0	(Guatemala) Comunicaciones	Tegucigalpa, Honduras
	Nil		Nil	Stadium: Estadio Tiburcio Carías Andino

6 November 1997 2nd leg	Comunicaciones (Guatemala)	0–0 (0–0 agg.) (3–4 p)	(Honduras) Motagua	Guatemala City, Guatemala
	Nil		Nil	Stadium: Estadio Mateo Flores

== Group phase ==
=== Group A ===
Pos	Team	Pld	W	D	L	GF	GA	GD	Pts	Qualification
1	(Guatemala) Municipal	6	4	1	1	8	4	+4	14 (Note: Municipal one (+1) point added)	Qualified to Semifinals
2	(Honduras) Olimpia	6	4	0	2	11	7	+4	12	Qualified to Semifinals
3	(Costa Rica) Herediano	6	3	0	3	8	5	+3	9	
4	(El Salvador) Águila	6	0	1	5	2	13	−11	1	

Notes:

As of 17 December 1997

Home \ Away	ÁGU	HER	MUN	OLI
Águila		0–2	1–1	0–3
Herediano	3–0		0–1	2–1
Municipal	2–0	1–0		1–0
Olimpia	2–1	2–1	3–2	

Source: RSSSF
Legend: Blue = home team win; Yellow = draw; Red = away team win.
- Águila 2–3 Municipal on penalty shootouts.

October 22, 1997	Águila (El Salvador)	0-2	(Costa Rica) Herediano
			Rolando Corella 50'; Marcelo Saravia 58'	Attendance: 3,166

October 23, 1997	Olimpia (Honduras)	3-2	(Guatemala) Municipal
	TBD		TBD

October 29, 1997	Herediano (Costa Rica)	2-1	(Honduras) Olimpia
	TBD		TBD

October 29, 1997	Municipal (Guatemala)	2-0	(El Salvador) Águila
	TBD

November 5, 1997	Municipal (Guatemala)	1-0	(Costa Rica) Herediano
	Ariel Beltramo 71'

December 4, 1997	Águila (El Salvador)	0-3	(Honduras) Olimpia
			TBD; TBD; TBD

November 13, 1997	Herediano (Costa Rica)	3-0	(El Salvador) Águila
	TBD		TBD

November 13, 1997	Municipal (Guatemala)	1-0	(Honduras) Olimpia
	TBD		Nil

November 19, 1997	Olimpia (Honduras)	2-1	(Costa Rica) Herediano
	TBD; TBD		TBD

November 19, 1997	Águila (El Salvador)	1-1	(Guatemala) Municipal
	TBD		TBD

December 10, 1997	Herediano (Costa Rica)	0-1	(Guatemala) Municipal
			TBD

December 17, 1997	Olimpia (Honduras)	2-1	(El Salvador) Águila
	TBD; TBD		TBD

=== Group B ===
Pos	Team	Pld	W	D	L	GF	GA	GD	Pts	Qualification
1	(Costa Rica) Saprissa	6	2	3	1	6	3	+3	11 (Note: Saprissa two (+2) points added)	Qualified to Semifinals
2	(Honduras) Real España	5	2	3	0	2	0	+2	11 (Note: Real España two (+2) points added)	Qualified to Semifinals
3	(Guatemala) Aurora	5	0	3	2	2	6	−4	5 (Note: Aurora two (+2) points added)	
4	(Honduras) Motagua	4	0	3	1	2	3	−1	3	

Notes:

As of 11 December 1997

Home \ Away	AUR	MOT	RES	SAP
Aurora		1–1	0–0	1–4
Motagua				1–1
Real España	1–0	0–0		1–0
Saprissa	0–0	1–0	0–0	

Source: RSSSF
Legend: Blue = home team win; Yellow = draw; Red = away team win.
- Saprissa 4–3 Aurora on penalty shootouts.
- Motagua 3–4 Saprissa on penalty shootouts.
- Saprissa 3–5 Real España on penalty shootouts.
- Aurora 4–2 Motagua on penalty shootouts.
- Saprissa 3–5 Real España on penalty shootouts.
- Real España 5–4 Motagua on penalty shootouts.
- Aurora 5–3 Real España on penalty shootouts.
- Motagua's remaining matches were not played.

October 29, 1997	Real España (Honduras)	1-0	(Costa Rica) Saprissa
	TBD		Nil

October 29, 1997	Motagua (Honduras)	v	(Guatemala) Aurora
	TBD		TBD

November 6, 1997	Saprissa (Costa Rica)	0-0	(Guatemala) Aurora
	Nil		Nil

November 6, 1997	Motagua (Honduras)	v	(Honduras) Real España
	TBD		TBD

November 12, 1997	Real España (Honduras)	1-0	(Guatemala) Aurora
	Mario Rodríguez		Nil

November 12, 1997	Motagua (Honduras)	1-1	(Costa Rica) Saprissa
	Amado Guevara 32'		Alejandro Larrea 18'

November 20, 1997	Saprissa (Costa Rica)	0-0	(Honduras) Real España
	Nil		Nil

November 20, 1997	Aurora (Guatemala)	1-1	(Honduras) Motagua
	TBD		TBD

November 26, 1997	Aurora (Guatemala)	1-4	(Costa Rica) Saprissa
	TBD		TBD; TBD; TBD; TBD

November 29, 1997	Real España (Honduras)	0-0	(Honduras) Motagua
	Nil		Nil

December 3, 1997	Aurora (Guatemala)	0-0	(Honduras) Real España
	Nil		Nil

December 11, 1997	Saprissa (Costa Rica)	1-0	(Honduras) Motagua
	Wright

== Final round ==
=== Semifinals ===
18 February 1998 1st leg	Real España (Honduras)	0 – 1	(Guatemala) Municipal	San Pedro Sula, Honduras
	Nil		César Trijillo	Stadium: Estadio Olímpico Metropolitano

25 February 1998 2nd leg	Municipal (Guatemala)	2 – 1	(Honduras) Real España	Guatemala City, Guatemala
	Ronald Gómez; Ariel Beltrano		Tedy Martínez	Stadium: Estadio Mateo Flores

- Municipal won 3–1 on aggregate score.

19 August 1998 1st leg	Olimpia (Honduras)	v	(Costa Rica) Saprissa	Tegucigalpa, Honduras
				Stadium: Estadio Tiburcio Carías Andino

23 August 1998 2nd leg	Saprissa (Costa Rica)	v	(Honduras) Olimpia	San José, Costa Rica
				Stadium: Estadio Ricardo Saprissa Aymá

- The last suggested dates by Saprissa for the semifinals (19 and 23 August) were not accepted by Olimpia due to league obligations. UNCAF decided to award Saprissa a walkover.

=== Final ===
18 September 1998 1st leg	Saprissa (Costa Rica)	2 – 1	(Guatemala) Municipal	San José, Costa Rica
	Goal		Goal	Stadium: Estadio Ricardo Saprissa Aymá

23 September 1998 2nd leg	Municipal (Guatemala)	1 – 1	(Costa Rica) Saprissa	Guatemala City, Guatemala
	Goal		Goal	Stadium: Estadio Mateo Flores

- Saprissa won 3–2 on aggregate score.

Torneo Grandes de Centroamérica
1998 champion

4th title
