= 1997 Torneo Grandes de Centroamérica =

Tournament details
- Dates: 19 February–11 June 1997
- Teams: 8 (from 4 associations)

Final positions
- Champions: (El Salvador) Alianza (1st title)
- Runners-up: (Costa Rica) Saprissa

Tournament statistics
- Matches played: 28
- Goals scored: 72 (2.57 per match)

Alianza F.C. from El Salvador won the 1997 Torneo Grandes de Centroamerica after defeating Deportivo Saprissa in a single final match played in Costa Rica.

== Teams ==
Association	Team	Qualifying method	App.	Previous best
(Costa Rica) Costa Rica	Alajuelense	1996–97 Champions	4th	Champions (1996)
(Costa Rica) Costa Rica	Saprissa	1996–97 Runners-up	11th	Champions (1972, 1973, 1978)
(El Salvador) El Salvador	Alianza	1996–97 Champions	8th	Runners-up (1980)
(El Salvador) El Salvador	Águila	1996–97 Regular season winners	9th	Runners-up (1973)
Guatemala	Comunicaciones	1996–97 Champions	14th	Champions (1971, 1983)
Guatemala	Municipal	Invitee	10th	Champions (1974, 1977)
Honduras	Olimpia	1996–97 Champions	3rd	Champions (1981)
Honduras	Motagua	Invitee	2nd	Group stage (1979)

== Group A ==
19 February 1997	Motagua (Honduras)	0 – 0 (4 – 5 p)	(Costa Rica) Saprissa	Tegucigalpa, Honduras
	Nil		Nil	Stadium: Estadio Tiburcio Carías Andino

19 February 1997	Comunicaciones (Guatemala)	2 – 2 (3 – 4 p)	(El Salvador) Alianza	Guatemala City, Guatemala
	Goal		Goal	Stadium: Estadio Cementos Progreso

27 February 1997	Alianza (El Salvador)	1 – 1 (4 – 3 p)	(Honduras) Motagua	San Salvador, El Salvador
	Elías Montes 54'		Denilson Costa	Stadium: Estadio Nacional Flor Blanca
	Penalties
	La Cruz (penalty scored); Mirón (penalty scored); Chachagua (penalty scored); Meléndez (penalty scored); Bauzá (penalty missed)		(penalty scored) Guevara; (penalty scored) Costa; (penalty scored) Pérez; (penalty missed) Romero; (penalty missed) Arzú

5 March 1997	Comunicaciones (Guatemala)	1 – 1 (4 – 2 p)	(Honduras) Motagua	Guatemala City, Guatemala
	Goal		Goal	Stadium: Estadio Cementos Progreso

9 March 1997	Saprissa (Costa Rica)	0 – 1	(Guatemala) Comunicaciones	San José, Costa Rica
	Nil		Marco Benatto 18'	Stadium: Estadio Ricardo Saprissa Aymá

13 March 1997	Motagua (Honduras)	4 – 3	(Guatemala) Comunicaciones	Tegucigalpa, Honduras
	Goal		Goal	Stadium: Estadio Tiburcio Carías Andino

19 March 1997	Comunicaciones (Guatemala)	2 – 3	(Costa Rica) Saprissa	Guatemala City, Guatemala
	Goal		Goal	Stadium: Estadio Cementos Progreso

26 March 1997	Alianza (El Salvador)	0 – 0 (3 – 2 p)	(Guatemala) Comunicaciones	San Salvador, El Salvador
	Nil		Nil	Stadium: Estadio Cuscatlán
	Penalties
	Nelson Rojas (penalty scored); Alejandro Curbelo (penalty scored); Joaquin Canales (penalty scored)		Miguel Coronado (penalty scored); Raul Calderon (penalty scored); Rigoberto Gómez (penalty missed); Erick Miranda (penalty missed)

3 April 1997	Motagua (Honduras)	1 – 1 (2 – 4 p)	(El Salvador) Alianza	Tegucigalpa, Honduras
	Francisco Soares de Souza		Marcelo Bauzá 70'	Stadium: Estadio Tiburcio Carías Andino
	Penalties
	Guevara (penalty missed); Costa (penalty missed); Romero (penalty scored); Arzú (penalty scored)		(penalty scored) Mirón; (penalty scored) Canales; (penalty scored) Curbelo; (penalty scored) Bauzá

15 April 1997	Alianza (El Salvador)	1 – 0	(Costa Rica) Saprissa	San Salvador, El Salvador
	Joaquin Canales 76'		Nil	Stadium: Estadio Cuscatlán

21 April 1997	Saprissa (Costa Rica)	2 – 1	(Honduras) Motagua	San José, Costa Rica
	Adrián Andrés Mahía		Costa	Stadium: Estadio Ricardo Saprissa Aymá

25 April 1997	Saprissa (Costa Rica)	3 – 2	(El Salvador) Alianza	San José, Costa Rica
	Adrián Andrés Mahía 23' 42' 77'		Guevara 35'; Jose Lugo 47'	Stadium: Estadio Ricardo Saprissa Aymá

=== Standings ===
Pos	Team	Pld	W	PKW	PKL	L	GF	GA	GD	Pts
1	(Costa Rica) Saprissa	6	3	1	0	2	8	7	+1	11
2	(El Salvador) Alianza	6	1	4	0	1	7	7	0	11
3	(Honduras) Motagua	6	1	0	4	1	8	8	0	7
4	(Guatemala) Comunicaciones	6	1	1	2	2	9	10	−1	7

- Saprissa and Alianza qualified to the Semifinals.

== Group B ==
19 February 1997	Alajuelense (Costa Rica)	2 – 2 (4 – 2 p)	(Honduras) Olimpia	Alajuela, Costa Rica
	Froylán Ledezma 51'; Bernal Mullins 78'		Wilmer Velásquez 36'; Nahúm Espinoza 43'	Stadium: Estadio Alejandro Morera Soto

20 February 1997	Aguila (El Salvador)	0 – 0 (4 – 2 p)	(Guatemala) Municipal	San Miguel, El Salvador
	Nil		Nil	Stadium: Estadio Juan Francisco Barraza

26 February 1997	Olimpia (Honduras)	1 – 1 (5 – 6 p)	(El Salvador) Aguila	Tegucigalpa, Honduras
	Goal		Goal	Stadium: Estadio Tiburcio Carías Andino

6 March 1997	Olimpia (Honduras)	0 – 1	(Guatemala) Municipal	Tegucigalpa, Honduras
	Nil		TBD	Stadium: Estadio Tiburcio Carías Andino

9 March 1997	Municipal (Guatemala)	0 – 1	(Costa Rica) Alajuelense	Guatemala City, Guatemala
	Nil		Bérnal Mullins 88'	Stadium: Estadio Mateo Flores

12 March 1997	Municipal (Guatemala)	1 – 0	(Honduras) Olimpia	Guatemala City, Guatemala
	Enoy Dosantos 67'		Nil	Stadium: Estadio Mateo Flores

12 March 1997	Aguila (El Salvador)	1 – 2	(Costa Rica) Alajuelense	San Miguel, El Salvador
	Jorge Garay 1'		Bérnal Mullins 32' 80'	Stadium: Estadio Juan Francisco Barraza; Attendance: 5.000

25 March 1997	Municipal (Guatemala)	3 – 0	(El Salvador) Aguila	Guatemala City, Guatemala
	Fabian Salas 11'; Duban Areas 20'; Claudio de Oliveira 70'		Nil	Stadium: Estadio Mateo Flores

26 March 1997	Olimpia (Honduras)	0 – 0 (4 – 2 p)	(Costa Rica) Alajuelense	Tegucigalpa, Honduras
	Nil		Nil	Stadium: Estadio Tiburcio Carías Andino

2 April 1997	Aguila (El Salvador)	4 – 2	(Honduras) Olimpia	San Miguel, El Salvador
	Jorge Garay 26' 44'; Armando Lindo Lazo		Dolmo Flores 5' 52'	Stadium: Estadio Juan Francisco Barraza

17 April 1997	Alajuelense (Costa Rica)	3 – 1	(Guatemala) Municipal	Alajuela, Costa Rica
	Bérnal Mullins 6' 58'; Victor Badilla 69'		William Chinchilla 42'	Stadium: Estadio Alejandro Morera Soto; Referee: Victorino Rodriguez

22 April 1997	Alajuelense (Costa Rica)	3 – 3 (3 – 4 p)	(El Salvador) Aguila	Alajuela, Costa Rica
	Josef Miso 2'; Richard Mahoney 8'; Bernal Mullins 71'		Jorge Garay 20'; Armando Lindo 60'; Noe Fuentes 60'	Stadium: Estadio Alejandro Morera Soto; Referee: Mario Alfaro Escobar

=== Standings ===
Pos	Team	Pld	W	PKW	PKL	L	GF	GA	GD	Pts
1	(Costa Rica) Alajuelense	6	3	1	2	0	11	7	+4	13
2	(Guatemala) Municipal	6	3	0	1	2	6	4	+2	10
3	(El Salvador) Aguila	6	1	3	0	2	9	11	−2	9
4	(Honduras) Olimpia	6	0	1	2	3	5	9	−4	4

- Alajuelense and Municipal qualified to the Semifinals.

== Semifinals ==
25 May 1997 1st leg	Municipal (Guatemala)	2 – 2	(El Salvador) Alianza	Guatemala City, Guatemala
	Goal		Horacio Lugo; Alejandro Curbelo	Stadium: Estadio Mateo Flores

31 May 1997 1st leg	Alajuelense (Costa Rica)	0 – 4	(Costa Rica) Saprissa	Alajuela, Costa Rica
	Nil			Stadium: Estadio Alejandro Morera Soto

27 May 1997 2nd leg	Alianza (El Salvador)	0 – 0 (4 – 2 p)	(Guatemala) Municipal	San Salvador, El Salvador
	Nil		Nil	Stadium: Estadio Cuscatlán

- Alianza 2–2 Municipal on aggregate; Alianza won 4–2 on penalty shootouts.

Not played 2nd leg	Saprissa (Costa Rica)	v	(Costa Rica) Alajuelense	San José, Costa Rica
				Stadium: Estadio Ricardo Saprissa Aymá

- Saprissa won 4–0 on aggregate; serie decided in one match.

== Final ==
11 June 1997 Final	Saprissa (Costa Rica)	0 – 1	(El Salvador) Alianza	San José, Costa Rica
	Nil		Horacio Lugo 83'	Stadium: Estadio Ricardo Saprissa Aymá

- Alianza 1997 Central American champion; series decided in one match.
