= 1984 Copa Fraternidad =

Tournament details
- Teams: 8 (from 2 associations)

Final positions
- Champions: None

Tournament statistics
- Matches played: 8
- Goals scored: 22 (2.75 per match)

The 1984 Copa Fraternidad was the 14th edition of the Central American football club championship organized by UNCAF, the regional governing body of Central America. This was the last tournament under the name Copa Fraternidad.

The final round was scheduled to be played between the group winners, however, the tournament was abandoned and no team was proclaimed champions.

== Teams ==
Only El Salvador and Guatemala sent representatives.

Association	Team	Qualifying method	App.	Previous best
(El Salvador) El Salvador	Águila	1983 Champions	8th	Runners-up (1973)
(El Salvador) El Salvador	FAS	1983 Runners-up	5th	3rd (1980)
(El Salvador) El Salvador	Once Lobos	1983 Third place	2nd	Group stage (1983)
(El Salvador) El Salvador	Independiente	1983 Fourth place	3rd	Quarterfinals (1982)
Guatemala	Suchitepéquez	1983 Champions	4th	Second Round (1981)
Guatemala	Comunicaciones	1983 Runners-up	12th	Champions (1971, 1983)
Guatemala	Finanzas Industriales	1983 Third place	1st	—
Guatemala	Aurora	1983 Sixth place	9th	Champions (1976, 1979)

== Group I ==
Pos	Team	Pld	W	D	L	GF	GA	GD	Pts	Qualification or relegation
1	(El Salvador) Independiente	2	1	1	0	5	4	+1	3	Qualified to Final round
2	(El Salvador) Once Lobos	2	0	2	0	2	2	0	2	
3	(Guatemala) Comunicaciones	2	0	1	1	4	5	−1	1	

Once Lobos (El Salvador)	1–1	(Guatemala) Comunicaciones

Once Lobos (El Salvador)	1–1	(El Salvador) Independiente

Comunicaciones (Guatemala)	3–4	(El Salvador) Independiente

== Group II ==
Pos	Team	Pld	W	D	L	GF	GA	GD	Pts	Qualification or relegation
1	(Guatemala) Suchitepéquez	2	1	1	0	4	2	+2	3	Qualified to Final round
2	(El Salvador) FAS	2	1	1	0	4	3	+1	3	
3	(Guatemala) Finanzas Industriales	2	0	0	2	1	4	−3	0	

Suchitepéquez (Guatemala)	2–0	(Guatemala) Finanzas Industriales
		Nil

FAS (El Salvador)	2–0	(Guatemala) Finanzas Industriales
		Nil

Suchitepéquez (Guatemala)	2–2	(El Salvador) FAS

== Group III ==
Pos	Team	Pld	W	D	L	GF	GA	GD	Pts	Qualification or relegation
1	(Guatemala) Aurora	2	2	0	0	3	0	+3	4	Qualified to Final round
2	(El Salvador) Águila	2	0	0	2	0	3	−3	0	

Águila (El Salvador)	0–1	(Guatemala) Aurora
Nil

Aurora (Guatemala)	2–0	(El Salvador) Águila
		Nil

== Final Round ==
Scheduled to be played between Independiente F.C., C.D. Suchitepéquez and Aurora F.C. The tournament was abandoned and not finished.
