= Alberto López (Guatemalan footballer) =

Guatemalan footballer (born 1944)

Alberto "Cuqui" López Oliva (born 10 March 1944) is a Guatemalan football coach and former defender. He is one of three Guatemalan footballers to win the CONCACAF championship with both national team and club.

He played the entirety of his career for CSD Municipal in the Guatemalan top division, and was a part of the squad that won the 1974 CONCACAF Champions' Cup. He scored over 40 goals in his career, a relatively high number for a full back.

Also a member of the Guatemala national team, he was a part of the squad that won the 1967 CONCACAF Championship, and also competed in two World Cup qualifying campaigns and at the 1968 Olympic Games.

== Club career ==
López Oliva, a right back skilled both in defense and attack, and an outstanding free kick taker, made his professional debut in 1963 with Municipal, the only club he would represent. He played for Municipal from 1963 to 1980, and along players such as Benjamín Monterroso, Julio César Anderson, and José Emilio Mitrovich, led the team on to win back-to-back league titles in 1973 and 1974, the 1974 Copa Fraternidad, and the CONCACAF Champions' Cup in 1974 going on to play the Copa Interamericana against CA Independiente of Argentina.

During his club career, he won four league titles, one domestic cup, two Central American cup (Fraternidad), and the CONCACAF Champions' Cup, and scored 42 goals with Municipal, being the highest scoring defender in the history of the league. He retired from playing in the late 1970s, later becoming a coach.

== National team ==
López Oliva became a starter for the Guatemala national team by the age of 21, and as such he played at the II CONCACAF Championship in 1965, where Guatemala finished in second place, and at the 1967 edition of the tournament, where they were crowned champions over favorites Mexico, whom they beat 1–0 in a hard-fought match on López Oliva's 23rd birthday.

During Olympic qualification in 1968, after Guatemala had beaten Costa Rica 1–0 in the first leg of the series, López Oliva assisted in both goals of a 2–3 loss in the second leg in San José, which tied both teams in points and goal difference; after extra time, the qualified team was decided by a coin toss, with Guatemala winning the right to participate at the 1968 Olympic Tournament in Mexico, where López Oliva was a starter in all four of his team's matches and scored a goal in a 4–1 win against Thailand and another one in a 1–2 loss against Bulgaria.

He played in four matches during 1970 World Cup qualifying, and after helping Guatemala finish in the top two of the region for the third consecutive tournament at the 1969 CONCACAF Championship, he was called up again for the 1974 World Cup qualifiers, where he played two matches.

== Coaching career ==
Among other teams, López Oliva has coached Aurora F.C. and the lower divisions of Universidad.

== Honours ==
With CSD Municipal

- Guatemala Liga Mayor winner (4): 1969–70, 1973, 1974, 1976
- Guatemala Domestic Cup winner (1): 1967
- Copa Fraternidad winner (2): 1974, 1977.
- CONCACAF Champions' Cup winner: 1974

With the Guatemala national team

- CONCACAF Championship winner (1): 1967
