= 1996 Torneo Grandes de Centroamérica =

Tournament details
- Dates: 17 April – 11 June 1996
- Teams: 4 (from 2 associations)

Final positions
- Champions: (Costa Rica) Alajuelense (1st title)
- Runners-up: (Costa Rica) Saprissa

Tournament statistics
- Matches played: 12
- Goals scored: 42 (3.5 per match)

The 1996 Torneo Grandes de Centroamérica was the 15th UNCAF Club Tournament and the first one since 1984; the tournament was renamed Torneo Grandes de Centroamérica. Costa Rican side Liga Deportiva Alajuelense were crowned champions.

== Teams ==
Association	Team	Qualifying method	App.	Previous best
(Costa Rica) Costa Rica	Saprissa	1994–95 Champions	10th	Champions (1972, 1973, 1978)
(Costa Rica) Costa Rica	Alajuelense	1994–95 Runners-up	3rd	Group stage (1972, 1973)
Guatemala	Comunicaciones	1994–95 Champions	13th	Champions (1971, 1983)
Guatemala	Municipal	1994–95 Runners-up	9th	Champions (1974, 1977)

== Original format ==
Originally 2 groups of 4 teams were organized, however, Hondurans Motagua and Olimpia withdrew and they were scrapped from the groups. The day before the start, Atlético Marte also withdrew leaving the groups uneven; the draw was revised and all teams played each other in a home and away format.

Group A:

- (El Salvador) Atlético Marte (withdrew)
- (Guatemala) Municipal
- (Costa Rica) Alajuelense
- (Honduras) Motagua (withdrew)

Group B:

- (Guatemala) Comunicaciones
- (El Salvador) FAS
- (Costa Rica) Saprissa
- (Honduras) Olimpia (withdrew)

== Standings ==
Pos	Team	Pld	W	D	L	GF	GA	GD	Pts	Qualification
1	Alajuelense	6	3	2	1	12	8	+4	12 (Note: Alajuelense one (+1) point added.)	1996 Torneo Grandes de Centroamérica champions
2	Saprissa	6	3	0	3	14	11	+3	9	
3	Comunicaciones	6	2	2	2	11	13	−2	9 (Note: Comunicaciones one (+1) point added.)	
4	Municipal	6	1	2	3	5	10	−5	6 (Note: Municipal (+1) point added.)	

== Results ==
17 April 1996	Municipal (Guatemala)	0 – 0 (3 – 5 p)	(Costa Rica) Alajuelense	Guatemala City, Guatemala
	Nil		Nil	Stadium: Estadio Mateo Flores

18 April 1996	Saprissa (Costa Rica)	3 – 2	(Guatemala) Comunicaciones	San José, Costa Rica
				Stadium: Estadio Ricardo Saprissa Aymá

1 May 1996	Comunicaciones (Guatemala)	2 – 1	(Guatemala) Municipal	Guatemala City, Guatemala
				Stadium: Estadio Cementos Progreso

9 May 1996	Saprissa (Costa Rica)	4 – 2	(Guatemala) Municipal	San José, Costa Rica
				Stadium: Estadio Ricardo Saprissa Aymá

17 May 1996	Comunicaciones (Guatemala)	2 – 2 (5 – 4 p)	(Costa Rica) Alajuelense	Guatemala City, Guatemala
				Stadium: Estadio Cementos Progreso

19 May 1996	Saprissa (Costa Rica)	5 – 0	(Costa Rica) Alajuelense	San José, Costa Rica
			Nil	Stadium: Estadio Ricardo Saprissa Aymá

23 May 1996	Alajuelense (Costa Rica)	3 – 0	(Guatemala) Municipal	Alajuela, Costa Rica
			Nil	Stadium: Estadio Alejandro Morera Soto

26 May 1996	Alajuelense (Costa Rica)	3 – 0	(Costa Rica) Saprissa	Alajuela, Costa Rica
	Ronald Gomez		Nil	Stadium: Estadio Alejandro Morera Soto

29 May 1996	Comunicaciones (Guatemala)	3 – 2	(Costa Rica) Saprissa	Guatemala City, Guatemala
				Stadium: Estadio Cementos Progreso

31 May 1996	Municipal (Guatemala)	1 – 0	(Costa Rica) Saprissa	Guatemala City, Guatemala
			Nil	Stadium: Estadio Mateo Flores

5 June 1996	Municipal (Guatemala)	1 – 1 (4 – 3 p)	(Guatemala) Comunicaciones	Guatemala City, Guatemala
				Stadium: Estadio Mateo Flores

11 June 1996	Alajuelense (Costa Rica)	4 – 1	(Guatemala) Comunicaciones	Alajuela, Costa Rica
				Stadium: Estadio Alejandro Morera Soto
