= Miguel Acosta =

Miguel Acosta may refer to:

- Miguel Acosta (boxer) (born 1978), Venezuelan boxer
- Miguel Acosta (footballer, born 1972) (Miguel Ángel Acosta Martínez), Paraguayan football defender
- Miguel Acosta (footballer, born 1975) (Miguel Acosta Moreno), Mexican football manager and former player
- Miguel Acosta (footballer, born 1998) (Miguel Acosta Mateos), Spanish footballer
- Miguel Acosta (character), fictional character in Scream
