= 1980 Copa Fraternidad =

Tournament details
- Teams: 12 (from 3 associations)

Final positions
- Champions: (Honduras) Broncos (1st title)
- Runners-up: (El Salvador) Alianza

The 1980 Copa Fraternidad was the 10th edition of the Central American football club championship organized by UNCAF, the regional governing body of Central America.

Broncos won their first title by defeating Alianza and FAS in the final round. Aurora won the previous tournament, but did not qualify for this tournament and were unable to defend their title.

== Teams ==
Only El Salvador, Guatemala and Honduras sent representatives.

Association	Team	Qualifying method	App.	Previous best
(El Salvador) El Salvador	Santiagueño	1979–80 Champions	2nd	Group stage (1979)
(El Salvador) El Salvador	Águila	1979–80 Runners-up	5th	Runners-up (1973)
(El Salvador) El Salvador	FAS	1979–80 Third place	3rd	Second round (1978)
(El Salvador) El Salvador	Alianza	1979–80 Sixth place	6th	5th (1971, 1974)
Guatemala	Comunicaciones	1979–80 Champions	8th	Champions (1971)
Guatemala	Cobán Imperial	1979–80 Runners-up	2nd	Group stage (1979)
Guatemala	Municipal	1979–80 Third place	8th	Champions (1974, 1977)
Guatemala	Suchitepéquez	1979–80 Fourth place	1st	—
Honduras	Marathón	1979–80 Champions	1st	—
Honduras	Universidad	1979–80 Runners-up	1st	—
Honduras	Victoria	1979–80 Third place	1st	—
Honduras	Broncos	1979–80 Fourth place	2nd	Group stage (1979)

== First round ==
Team 1	Agg.	Team 2	1st leg	2nd leg
Marathón (Honduras)	1–10	(El Salvador) FAS	1–2	0–8
Águila (El Salvador)	6–4	(Guatemala) Suchitepéquez	4–3	2–1
Santiagueño (El Salvador)	4–6	(Guatemala) Municipal	2–1	2–5
Broncos (Honduras)	1–0	(Guatemala) Cobán Imperial	1–0	0–0
Universidad (Honduras)	2-3	(El Salvador) Alianza	1–1	1-2
Comunicaciones (Guatemala)	4–1	(Honduras) Victoria	1–0	3–1

20 February, 1980	Marathón (Honduras)	1–2	(El Salvador) FAS	San Pedro Sula, Honduras
	Felix Carranza		Mágico González; Norberto Huezo	Stadium: Estadio Morazan

(El Salvador) FAS	8–0	Marathón (Honduras)
TBD; TBD		Nil

- FAS advanced 10–1 on aggregate.

(El Salvador) Aguila	4-3	(Guatemala) Suchitepéquez
Nil		Nil

Suchitepéquez (Guatemala)	1-2	(El Salvador) Aguila
TBD; TBD		Nil

- Aguila advanced 6-4 on aggregate.

Santiagueño (El Salvador)	2-1	(Guatemala) Municipal
Nil		Nil

(Guatemala) Municipal	5-2	(El Salvador) Santiagueño
TBD; TBD		Nil

- Municipal advanced 6-4 on aggregate.

Broncos (Honduras)	1–0	(Guatemala) Cobán Imperial
TBD		Nil

Cobán Imperial (Guatemala)	0–0	(Honduras) Broncos
Nil		Nil

- Broncos advanced 1–0 on aggregate.

Universidad (Honduras)	1-1	(El Salvador) Alianza
TBD		TBD

12 March, 1980	Alianza (El Salvador)	2–1	(Honduras) Universidad
	Carlos Paez; Gustavo Guerrero		Daniel Sambula

- Alianza advanced 3-2 on aggregate.

Comunicaciones (Guatemala)	1–0	(Honduras) Victoria
TBD		Nil

19 March, 1980	Victoria (Honduras)	1-3	(Guatemala) Comunicaciones
	Peter Buchanan		Ramon Tanque Ramirez; Felix Mcdonald; Raul Cocherini

- Comunicaciones advanced 4-1 on aggregate.

== Second round ==
Team 1	Agg.	Team 2	1st leg	2nd leg
Comunicaciones (Guatemala)	2–4	(El Salvador) FAS	2–1	0–3
Broncos (Honduras)	4–3	(Guatemala) Municipal	2–1	2–2
Águila (El Salvador)	2–7	(El Salvador) Alianza	2–3	0–4

Comunicaciones (Guatemala)	2-1	(El Salvador) FAS
TBD		TBD

FAS (El Salvador)	3-0	(Guatemala) Comunicaciones
TBD; TBD		TBD

- FAS advanced 4-2 on aggregate.

Broncos (Honduras)	2-1	(Guatemala) Municipal
TBD; TBD		TBD

April, 1980	Municipal (Guatemala)	2–2	(Honduras) Broncos	Estadio Mateo Flores
	Elman Rodas; Allan Costly o.g.'		Walter Jimminson; Javier Toledo

- Broncos advanced 4-3 on aggregate.

Águila (El Salvador)	2-3	(El Salvador) Alianza
TBD; TBD		TBD; TBD; TBD

Alianza (Honduras)	4-0	(El Salvador) Águila
TBD; TBD; TBD; TBD		Nil

- Alianza advanced 7-2 on aggregate.

== Final Round ==
Pos	Team	Pld	W	D	L	GF	GA	GD	Pts
1	(Honduras) Broncos	4	2	2	0	3	1	+2	6
2	(El Salvador) Alianza	4	0	3	1	1	2	−1	3
3	(El Salvador) FAS	4	0	3	1	0	1	−1	3

1980	Alianza (El Salvador)	0–0	(El Salvador) FAS
	Nil		Nil

1980	FAS (El Salvador)	0–0	(El Salvador) Alianza
	Nil		Nil

1980	Broncos (Honduras)	0–0	(El Salvador) Alianza
	Nil		Nil

1980	FAS (El Salvador)	0–0	(Honduras) Broncos
	Nil		Nil

1980	Broncos (Honduras)	1–0	(El Salvador) FAS
	TBD		Nil

1980	Broncos (Honduras)	2–1	(El Salvador) Alianza
	TBD; TBD		TBD

== Champion ==
1980 Copa Fraternidad winners

Broncos
1st title

== See also ==
- 1980 CONCACAF Champions' Cup
