= Estadio del Ejército =

Former stadium in Guatemala City

Coordinates: 14°36′56″N 90°30′35″W

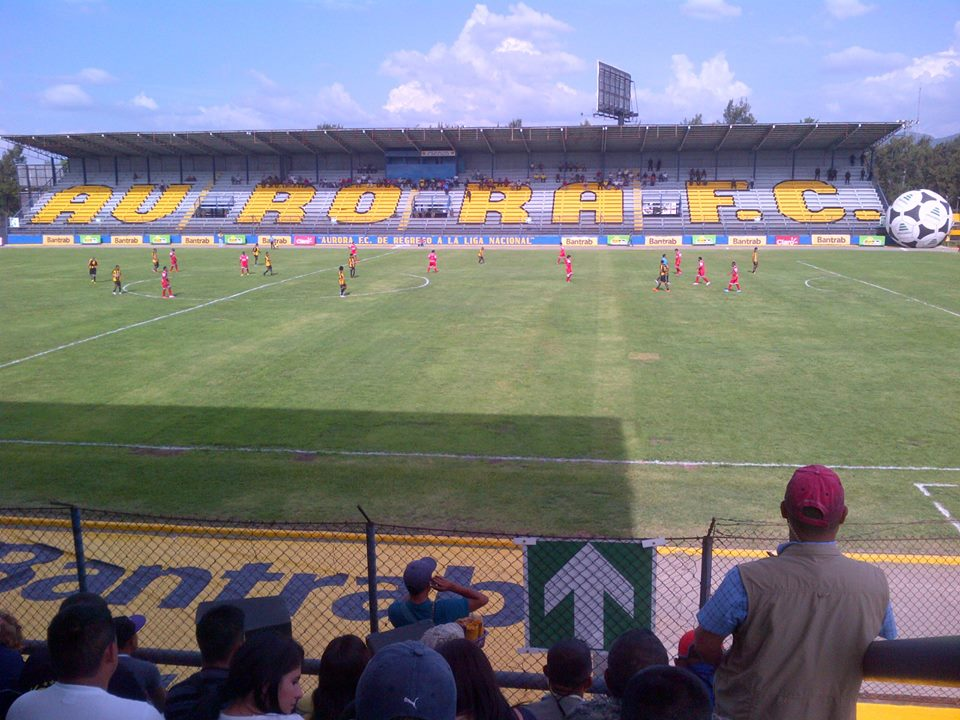
Estadio del Ejército

Estadio del Ejército, officially Estadio Coronel Guillermo Reyes Gramajo was a football stadium located in Guatemala City, the capital of Guatemala. The stadium was built in 1950 and was the home of Aurora F.C. It was demolished in late 2021 as a replacement for a shopping center.

The stadium's maximum seating capacity is 13,000 people. It was also formerly also used for rugby and served as the home of the Guatemala Killers from 1995–2003.
