= 1983 Copa Fraternidad =

Tournament details
- Teams: 9 (from 3 associations)

Final positions
- Champions: (Guatemala) Comunicaciones (2nd title)
- Runners-up: (Guatemala) Aurora

The 1983 Copa Fraternidad was the 13th edition of the Central American football club championship organized by UNCAF, the regional governing body of Central America.

Comunicaciones F.C. won their second title by winning the final round.

== Teams ==
Only Costa Rica, El Salvador and Guatemala sent representatives.

Association	Team	Qualifying method	App.	Previous best
(Costa Rica) Costa Rica	Saprissa	1981–82 Champions	9th	Champions (1972, 1973, 1978)
(Costa Rica) Costa Rica	Herediano	Unclear	5th	3rd (1971, 1975)
(El Salvador) El Salvador	Atlético Marte	1982 Champions	6th	4th (1971)
(El Salvador) El Salvador	Independiente	1982 Runners-up	2nd	Quarterfinals (1982)
(El Salvador) El Salvador	Once Lobos	1982 Semifinalist	1st	—
(El Salvador) El Salvador	Águila	1982 Semifinalist	7th	Runners-up (1973)
Guatemala	Comunicaciones	1982 Champions	11th	Champions (1971)
Guatemala	Suchitepéquez	1982 Runners-up	3rd	Second Round (1981)
Guatemala	Aurora	1982 Third place	8th	Champions (1976, 1979)

== Group I ==
Pos	Team	Pld	W	D	L	GF	GA	GD	Pts	Qualification or relegation
1	(Guatemala) Comunicaciones	2	1	1	0	2	1	+1	3	Qualified to Final round
2	(Guatemala) Suchitepéquez	2	0	2	0	1	1	0	2	
3	(El Salvador) Once Lobos	2	0	1	1	0	1	−1	1	

Comunicaciones (Guatemala)	1–0	(El Salvador) Once Lobos
TBD		Nil

Suchitepéquez (Guatemala)	0–0	(El Salvador) Once Lobos
Nil		Nil

Comunicaciones (Guatemala)	1–1	(Guatemala) Suchitepéquez
TBD		TBD

== Group II ==
Pos	Team	Pld	W	D	L	GF	GA	GD	Pts	Qualification or relegation
1	(Guatemala) Aurora	2	2	0	0	5	1	+4	4	Qualified to Final round
2	(El Salvador) Independiente	2	0	1	1	1	2	−1	1	
3	(Costa Rica) Saprissa	2	0	0	2	2	5	−3	0	

Saprissa (Costa Rica)	1–4	(Guatemala) Aurora
TBD		TBD; TBD; TBD; TBD

Aurora (Guatemala)	1–0	(El Salvador) Independiente
TBD		Nil

Saprissa (Costa Rica)	1–1	(El Salvador) Independiente
TBD		TBD

== Group III ==
Águila won group

Atlético Marte (El Salvador)	1–1	(Costa Rica) Herediano
TBD		TBD

Águila (El Salvador)	unk	(El Salvador) Atlético Marte

Águila (El Salvador)	1–1	(Costa Rica) Herediano
TBD		TBD

== Final Round ==
Also known as Triangular

Pos	Team	Pld	W	D	L	GF	GA	GD	Pts	Qualification or relegation
1	(Guatemala) Comunicaciones	3	2	1	0	11	4	+7	5	1983 Copa Fraternidad champions
2	(Guatemala) Aurora	3	1	1	1	7	5	+2	3	
3	(El Salvador) Águila	2	0	0	2	2	11	−9	0	

Aurora (Guatemala)	1–1	(Guatemala) Comunicaciones
TBD		TBD

Aurora (Guatemala)	4–1	(El Salvador) Águila
TBD; TBD; TBD; TBD		TBD

Comunicaciones (Guatemala)	7–1	(El Salvador) Águila
TBD; TBD; TBD; TBD; TBD; TBD		TBD

Replay	Comunicaciones (Guatemala)	3–2 (a.e.t.)	(Guatemala) Aurora
	TBD; TBD; Oscar Sánchez		TBD; TBD
