= Eduardo Pineda =

Salvadoran footballer (1931–2017)

Personal information
- Full name: Carlos Eduardo Pineda Moreno
- Date of birth: 31 October 1931
- Place of birth: Santa Ana, El Salvador
- Date of death: 10 June 2017 (aged 85)
- Position: Striker

Youth career
- Cosmos

Senior career*
| Years | Team | Apps | (Gls) |
| 1947–1961 | FAS | | (67) |
- Atlante

International career
| 1953 | El Salvador | 15 | (4) |
- * Club domestic league appearances and goals as of 31 October 2011

Carlos Eduardo Pineda Moreno (31 October 1931 – 10 June 2017) was a Salvadoran footballer.

== Club career ==
Nicknamed el Monito (The Monkey), Pineda started his career at second division Cosmos and was part of the FAS first team, and holds a moment in history being FAS first goalscorer in 1948, he went on to win four titles (1951–52, 1953–54, 1956-57 y 1961-62). He also had a spell at Atlante.

== International career ==
Pineda represented El Salvador fifteen times scoring 4 goals.

== Death ==
Pineda died on 10 June 2017, at the age of 85.
