= Marcelo Saraiva =

Guatemalan footballer

Personal information
- Full name: Marcelo Andrés Valencia Saraiva
- Date of birth: 17 May 2002 (age 24)
- Place of birth: Guatemala City, Guatemala
- Height: 1.83 m (6 ft 0 in)
- Position: Defensive midfielder

Youth career
- 2012–2017: Flamengo
- 2017–2020: Internacional
- 2021–2022: Nottingham Forest

Senior career*
Years	Team	Apps	(Gls)
2022–2023	Antigua	6	(0)
2024–2025	Comunicaciones	2	(0)

International career^{‡}
2019	Guatemala U17	4	(0)
2019–2021	Guatemala	2	(0)
- * Club domestic league appearances and goals as of 30 November 2024 ‡ National team caps and goals as of 6 January 2021

Marcelo Andrés Valencia Saraiva (born 17 May 2002) is a Guatemalan professional footballer who plays as a defensive midfielder.

== Club career ==
=== Nottingham Forest ===
Saraiva joined the Nottingham Forest under-23's side on 7 January 2021, signing a contract until June 2022. Saraiva had previously played with Brazilian sides Flamengo and Internacional, but left the latter club in September 2020 to pursue opportunities in Europe following a successful application for a Portuguese passport. On 10 June 2022, Nottingham Forest announced that Saraiva would be leaving the club once his contract expired.

== International career ==
Saraiva has represented Guatemala at the under-17 level in 2019, before playing with the senior Guatemala national team against Puerto Rico in the CONCACAF Nations League in November 2019.

== Personal life ==
Marcelo is the son of former Brazilian footballer Marcelo Henrique Saraiva and Lourdes Valencia, who belongs to a family of renowned Guatemalan footballers including Everaldo Valencia, who also played for the Guatemala National Team.
