= 2001 UNCAF Interclub Cup =

Tournament details
- Dates: 8 August – 16 September 2001
- Teams: 8 (from 1 confederation)

Final positions
- Champions: (Guatemala) Municipal (3rd title)
- Runners-up: (Costa Rica) Saprissa

Tournament statistics
- Matches played: 24
- Goals scored: 56 (2.33 per match)

The 2001 UNCAF Interclub Cup served as qualification to the 2002 CONCACAF Champions' Cup; it also defined C.S.D. Municipal as the Central American champion of the season. The final round was played at San José, Costa Rica.

== First round ==
- Top two places advance to the Final Round

=== Group A ===
Pos	Team	Pld	W	D	L	GF	GA	GD	Pts	Qualification
1	(Costa Rica) Saprissa	3	2	1	0	5	3	+2	7	Qualification for Final round
2	(Guatemala) Comunicaciones	3	1	1	1	3	3	0	4	Qualification for Final round
3	(Panama) Tauro	3	1	1	1	3	3	0	4	
4	(Honduras) Motagua	3	0	1	2	1	3	−2	1	

- Comunicaciones qualifies for the Final Round ahead of Tauro F.C. based on head-to-head results.

15 August 2001 Day 1	Saprissa (Costa Rica)	1–1	(Panama) Tauro	Guatemala City, Guatemala
	Saborío 56'		6' Nazarit	Stadium: Estadio Doroteo Guamuch Flores

15 August 2001 Day 1	Comunicaciones (Guatemala)	0–0	(Honduras) Motagua	Guatemala City, Guatemala
				Stadium: Estadio Doroteo Guamuch Flores

17 August 2001 Day 2	Motagua (Honduras)	0–1	(Panama) Tauro	Guatemala City, Guatemala
			6' Wiltshire	Stadium: Estadio Doroteo Guamuch Flores

17 August 2001 Day 2	Comunicaciones (Guatemala)	1–2	(Costa Rica) Saprissa	Guatemala City, Guatemala
	Valencia 17'		10' Cordero; 82' Saborío	Stadium: Estadio Doroteo Guamuch Flores

19 August 2001 Day 3	Comunicaciones (Guatemala)	2–1	(Panama) Tauro	Guatemala City, Guatemala
	Valencia 36'; Rivera 59'		12' Rodríguez	Stadium: Estadio Doroteo Guamuch Flores

19 August 2001 Day 3	Motagua (Honduras)	1–2	(Costa Rica) Saprissa	Guatemala City, Guatemala
	Leyes 16' (pen.)		2' Núñez; 69' Centeno	Stadium: Estadio Doroteo Guamuch Flores

=== Group B ===
Pos	Team	Pld	W	D	L	GF	GA	GD	Pts	Qualification
1	(Guatemala) Municipal	3	1	2	0	9	2	+7	5	Qualification for Final round
2	(Honduras) Olimpia	3	1	2	0	6	0	+6	5	Qualification for Final round
3	(Costa Rica) Alajuelense	3	1	2	0	8	3	+5	5	
4	(Panama) Plaza Amador	3	0	0	3	1	19	−18	0	

8 August 2001 Day 1	Alajuelense (Costa Rica)	6–1	(Panama) Plaza Amador	Tegucigalpa, Honduras
	Miso 25'; Oviedo 39'; Delgado 43' (pen.); Castro 59'; Rosella 60'; Solís 66'		79' Román	Stadium: Estadio Tiburcio Carías Andino

8 August 2001 Day 1	Olimpia (Honduras)	0–0	(Guatemala) Municipal	Tegucigalpa, Honduras
				Stadium: Estadio Tiburcio Carías Andino

10 August 2001 Day 2	Municipal (Guatemala)	7–0	(Panama) Plaza Amador	Tegucigalpa, Honduras
	Plata 21' 28' 83'; Barros 34' 88'; Estrada 71'; Romero 90'			Stadium: Estadio Tiburcio Carías Andino

10 August 2001 Day 2	Olimpia (Honduras)	0–0	(Costa Rica) Alajuelense	Tegucigalpa, Honduras
				Stadium: Estadio Tiburcio Carías Andino

12 August 2001 Day 3	Alajuelense (Costa Rica)	2–2	(Guatemala) Municipal	Tegucigalpa, Honduras
	Romero 16'; Acevedo 32'		36' 90' Jiménez	Stadium: Estadio Tiburcio Carías Andino

12 August 2001 Day 3	Olimpia (Honduras)	6–0	(Panama) Plaza Amador	Tegucigalpa, Honduras
	Ulloa 13'; Fuentes 15'; Costa 29' 80' 88'; Tilguath 41'			Stadium: Estadio Tiburcio Carías Andino

== Final round ==
Pos	Team	Pld	W	D	L	GF	GA	GD	Pts	Qualification
1	(Guatemala) Municipal	3	2	1	0	7	2	+5	7	Qualification for 2002 CONCACAF Champions' Cup
2	(Costa Rica) Saprissa	3	2	1	0	7	4	+3	7	Qualification for 2002 CONCACAF Champions' Cup
3	(Honduras) Olimpia	3	1	0	2	4	5	−1	3	Qualification for 2002 CONCACAF Champions' Cup
4	(Guatemala) Comunicaciones	3	0	0	3	2	9	−7	0	

12 September 2001 Day 1	Saprissa (Costa Rica)	1–1	(Guatemala) Municipal	San Juan de Tibás, Costa Rica
	Centeno 62'		3' Plata	Stadium: Estadio Ricardo Saprissa Aymá

12 September 2001 Day 1	Comunicaciones (Guatemala)	0–2	(Honduras) Olimpia	San Juan de Tibás, Costa Rica
			70' Fuentes; 72' Domínguez	Stadium: Estadio Ricardo Saprissa Aymá

14 September 2001 Day 2	Saprissa (Costa Rica)	3–1	(Honduras) Olimpia	San Juan de Tibás, Costa Rica
	Centeno 52' 56'; Campos 81'		61' Tosello	Stadium: Estadio Ricardo Saprissa Aymá

14 September 2001 Day 2	Comunicaciones (Guatemala)	0–4	(Guatemala) Municipal	San Juan de Tibás, Costa Rica
			3' Girón; 55' Barros; 63' (pen.) Plata; 83' Ruiz	Stadium: Estadio Ricardo Saprissa Aymá

16 September 2001 Day 3	Saprissa (Costa Rica)	3–2	(Guatemala) Comunicaciones	San Juan de Tibás, Costa Rica
	Centeno 10'; Ramírez 18'; Núñez 75'		37' 50' Estrada	Stadium: Estadio Ricardo Saprissa Aymá

16 September 2001 Day 3	Municipal (Guatemala)	2–1	(Honduras) Olimpia	San Juan de Tibás, Costa Rica
	Plata 25'; Ruiz 75'		40' Costa	Stadium: Estadio Ricardo Saprissa Aymá

- Municipal, Saprissa, and Olimpia qualified to the 2002 CONCACAF Champions' Cup.

2001 UNCAF champions
Municipal
3rd title
