= Miguel Acosta (footballer, born 1972) =

Paraguayan footballer

Personal information
- Full name: Miguel Ángel Acosta
- Date of birth: 29 March 1999 (age 27)
- Place of birth: Asunción, Paraguay
- Height: 1.79 m (5 ft 10 in)
- Position: Centre-back

Senior career*
Years	Team	Apps	(Gls)
1990-1994	Sportivo Luqueño		
1995	Colo-Colo	3	(0)
1996-1997	Olimpia		
1998	Cruz Azul		
1999-2000	Sportivo Luqueño		
2000-2001	Talleres de Córdoba	0	(0)
2002	Racing Club	0	(0)
2003	Deportes Puerto Montt	27	(1)
2004	Coquimbo Unido	19	(0)
2004-2005	Comunicaciones	18	(2)
2005	Sportivo Patria	2	(0)
2006	Guaraní	2	(1)
2006	General Caballero		

International career
1999	Paraguay	5	(0)
- * Club domestic league appearances and goals

Miguel Ángel Acosta (born 29 March 1972) is a Paraguayan former footballer who played as a centre-back for clubs in Paraguay, Argentina, Chile, Mexico and Guatemala.

== Teams ==
- (Paraguay) Sportivo Luqueño 1990-1994
- (Chile) Colo-Colo 1995
- (Paraguay) Olimpia 1996-1997
- (Mexico) Cruz Azul 1998
- (Paraguay) Sportivo Luqueño 1999-2000
- (Argentina) Talleres de Córdoba 2000-2001
- (Argentina) Racing Club 2002
- (Chile) Deportes Puerto Montt 2003
- (Chile) Coquimbo Unido 2004
- (Guatemala) Comunicaciones 2004-2005
- (Argentina) Sportivo Patria 2005
- (Paraguay) Guaraní 2006
- (Paraguay) General Caballero 2006
