= 2005 UNCAF Interclub Cup =

Tournament details
- Dates: 26 July – 30 November 2005
- Teams: 16 (from 7 associations)

Final positions
- Champions: (Costa Rica) Alajuelense (3rd title)
- Runners-up: (Honduras) Olimpia
- Third place: (Costa Rica) Saprissa
- Fourth place: (Costa Rica) Pérez Zeledón

Tournament statistics
- Matches played: 30
- Goals scored: 91 (3.03 per match)

The 2005 UNCAF Interclub Cup was the 23rd edition of the international club football competition held in the UNCAF region representing the seven nations of Central America. This was the seventh year of the current format using the name UNCAF Interclub Cup. The tournament was also a qualifying event for the 2006 CONCACAF Champions' Cup. Sixteen teams representing seven football associations took part, starting with the first qualifying games on July 26, 2005. The tournament ended with a two-legged final between Olimpia of Honduras and Alajuelense of Costa Rica. The first leg was played in Tegucigalpa, Honduras on November 23, 2005 and ended with Alajuelense earning a 1-0 victory. The second leg was played in Alajuela, Costa Rica on November 30, 2005 with Olimpia winning 1-0. Alajuelense then won the UNCAF Interclub Cup in a penalty shootout by the score of 4-2. The top three finishers in the tournament, Alajuelense, Olimpia, and Saprissa, qualified for the 2006 CONCACAF Champions' Cup.

== Bracket ==
First round
(El Salvador)	FAS	0	0	0
(Costa Rica)	Deportivo Saprissa	2	0	2
(Honduras)	Marathón	3	-	W
(Nicaragua)	Parmalat F.C.	0	w/d	-
(Guatemala)	Suchitepéquez	2	2	4
(Nicaragua)	Diriangén	0	2	2
(Honduras)	Olimpia	3	1	4
(Belize)	Eagles	0	0	0
(Panama)	San Francisco	0	1	1
(Costa Rica)	Pérez Zeledón	0	3	3
(El Salvador)	Luis Ángel Firpo	4	2	6
(Guatemala)	Comunicaciones	2	2	4
(Belize)	Placencia Pirates	1	0	1
(Costa Rica)	Alajuelense	4	6	10
(Panama)	Árabe Unido	0	1	1
(Guatemala)	Municipal	0	4	4

Quarterfinals
(Costa Rica)	Deportivo Saprissa	4	0	4/5
(Honduras)	Marathón (AET, PSO)	0	4	4/4
(Guatemala)	Suchitepéquez	1	0	1
(Honduras)	Olimpia	4	4	8
(Costa Rica)	Pérez Zeledón	4	2	6
(El Salvador)	Luis Ángel Firpo	0	2	2
(Costa Rica)	Alajuelense	5	0	5
(Guatemala)	Municipal	2	1	3

Semifinals
(Costa Rica)	Deportivo Saprissa	1	1	2
(Honduras)	Olimpia	3	1	4
(Costa Rica)	Pérez Zeledón	1	0	1
(Costa Rica)	Alajuelense	0	3	3

Final
(Honduras)	Olimpia (AET, PSO)	0	1	1/2
(Costa Rica)	Alajuelense	1	0	1/4

== Round of 16 ==
26 July 2005 1st leg	FAS (El Salvador)	0–2	(Costa Rica) Saprissa	Santa Ana, El Salvador
CST			49' Saborío; 74' Solís	Stadium: Estadio Óscar Quiteño

26 July 2005 1st leg	Marathón (Honduras)	(Walkover)	(Nicaragua) Parmalat	San Pedro Sula, Honduras
CST		* Parmalat were dissolved prior the start of the tournament and Marathón advanced automatically.		Stadium: Estadio Francisco Morazán

27 July 2005 1st leg	Suchitepéquez (Guatemala)	2–2	(Nicaragua) Diriangén	Mazatenango, Guatemala
CST	Trujillo 20' (pen.); Loaiza 46'		69' 82' Palacios	Stadium: Estadio Carlos Salazar Hijo

27 July 2005 1st leg	San Francisco (Panama)	0–0	(Costa Rica) Pérez Zeledón	La Chorrera, Panama
EST				Stadium: Estadio Agustín Sánchez

27 July 2005 1st leg	Olimpia (Honduras)	3–0	(Belize) Eagles	Tegucigalpa, Honduras
CST	Tosello 12'; Ferreira 59'; Velásquez 70'			Stadium: Estadio Tiburcio Carías Andino; Attendance: 2,103

28 July 2005 1st leg	Luis Ángel Firpo (El Salvador)	4–2	(Guatemala) Comunicaciones	Usulután, El Salvador
CST	A. Martínez 30'; M. Martínez 35' 90'; Castro 74'		32' Pavón; 46' Fonseca	Stadium: Sergio Torres Stadium

28 July 2005 1st leg	Placencia Pirates (Belize)	1–4	(Costa Rica) Alajuelense	Placencia, Belize
CST	Palacio 30'		12' López; 35' Díaz; 39' (pen.) Hernández; 90+' Ruiz	Stadium: Placencia Football Field

28 July 2005 1st leg	Árabe Unido (Panama)	0–0	(Guatemala) Municipal	Colón, Panama
EST				Stadium: Estadio Armando Dely Valdés

2 August 2005 2nd leg	Comunicaciones (Guatemala)	2–2	(El Salvador) Luis Ángel Firpo	Guatemala City, Guatemala
19:00 CST	Pavón 20'; Fonseca 56'		53' 81' Martínez	Stadium: Estadio Cementos Progreso

2 August 2005 2nd leg	Alajuelense (Costa Rica)	6–0	(Belize) Placencia Pirates	Alajuela, Costa Rica
20:00 CST	Lenárez 52' (o.g.); Ledezma 61' 90' (pen.); Jiménez 69'; Rodríguez 77'; Scott 86'			Stadium: Estadio Alejandro Morera Soto

3 August 2005 2nd leg	Saprissa (Costa Rica)	0–0	(El Salvador) FAS	San Juan de Tibás, Costa Rica
19:00 CST				Stadium: Estadio Ricardo Saprissa Aymá

3 August 2005 2nd leg	Parmalat (Nicaragua)	(Walkover)	(Honduras) Marathón	Nicaragua
CST		* Parmalat were dissolved prior the start of the tournament and Marathón advanced automatically.

3 August 2005 2nd leg	Diriangén (Nicaragua)	0–2	(Guatemala) Suchitepéquez	Diriamba, Nicaragua
16:15 CST			13' 56' Villatoro	Stadium: Estadio Cacique Diriangén

4 August 2005 2nd leg	Eagles (Belize)	0–1	(Honduras) Olimpia	Belize City, Belize
19:30 CST			Figueroa	Stadium: People's Stadium

4 August 2005 2nd leg	Municipal (Guatemala)	4–1	(Panama) Árabe Unido	Guatemala City, Guatemala
19:30 CST	Figueroa 21'; Plata 30' 45'; García 36'		35' Ávila	Stadium: Estadio Doroteo Guamuch Flores

4 August 2005 2nd leg	Pérez Zeledón (Costa Rica)	3–1	(Panama) San Francisco	San Isidro de El General, Costa Rica
20:00 CST	Lara 45' (pen.); González 58' 90+3'		56' Tello	Stadium: Estadio Municipal Pérez Zeledón

== Quarterfinals ==
Team #1	Agg.	Team #2	1st leg	2nd leg
Deportivo Saprissa (Costa Rica)	4 - 4 (aet) (5-4 pen)	(Honduras) Marathón	4 - 0	0 - 4	Estadio Ricardo Saprissa, San Juan de Tibás	Estadio Francisco Morazán, San Pedro Sula
Suchitepéquez (Guatemala)	1 - 8	(Honduras) Olimpia	1 - 4	0 - 4	Estadio Carlos Salazar Hijo, Mazatenango	Estadio Nacional Chelato Uclés, Tegucigalpa
Pérez Zeledón (Costa Rica)	6 - 2	(El Salvador) Luis Ángel Firpo	4 - 0	2 - 2	Estadio Municipal Pérez Zeledón, San Isidro de El General	Estadio Sergio Torres, Usulután
Alajuelense (Costa Rica)	5 - 3	(Guatemala) Municipal	5 - 2	0 - 1	Estadio Alejandro Morera Soto, Alajuela	Estadio Doroteo Guamuch Flores, Guatemala City

== Semifinals ==
Team #1	Agg.	Team #2	1st leg	2nd leg
Deportivo Saprissa (Costa Rica)	2 - 4	(Honduras) Olimpia	1 - 3	1 - 1	Estadio Ricardo Saprissa, San Juan de Tibás	Estadio Nacional Chelato Uclés, Tegucigalpa
Pérez Zeledón (Costa Rica)	1 - 3	(Costa Rica) Alajuelense	1 - 0	0 - 3	Estadio Alejandro Morera Soto, Alajuela	Estadio Municipal Pérez Zeledón, San Isidro de El General

== Third place ==
Team #1	Agg.	Team #2	1st leg	2nd leg
Deportivo Saprissa (Costa Rica)	2 - 2 (aet) (5-3 pen)	(Costa Rica) Pérez Zeledón	2 - 0	0 - 2	Estadio Ricardo Saprissa, San Juan de Tibás	Estadio Municipal Pérez Zeledón, San Isidro de El General

== Final ==
Team #1	Agg.	Team #2	1st leg	2nd leg
Olimpia (Honduras)	1 - 1 (aet) (2 - 4 pen)	(Costa Rica) Alajuelense	0 - 1	1 - 0	Estadio Nacional Chelato Uclés, Tegucigalpa	Estadio Alejandro Morera Soto, Alajuela

Alajuelense 2005 UNCAF champions

Alajuelense, Olimpia, Deportivo Saprissa advance to 2006 CONCACAF Champions' Cup quarterfinals.
