= 1981 Copa Fraternidad =

Tournament details
- Teams: 12 (from 3 associations)

Final positions
- Champions: (Honduras) Real España (1st title)
- Runners-up: (Honduras) Olimpia (Honduras) Marathón

The 1981 Copa Fraternidad was the 11th edition of the Central American football club championship organized by UNCAF, the regional governing body of Central America.

Real España won their first title by winning the final round, as Olimpia and Marathón quit the tournament.

== Teams ==
Only El Salvador, Guatemala and Honduras sent representatives.

Association	Team	Qualifying method	App.	Previous best
(El Salvador) El Salvador	Atlético Marte	1980–81 Champions	5th	4th (1971)
(El Salvador) El Salvador	Santiagueño	1980–81 Runners-up	3rd	First Round (1979, 1980)
(El Salvador) El Salvador	Alianza	1980–81 Third place	7th	Runners-up (1980)
(El Salvador) El Salvador	Águila	1980–81 Fourth place	6th	Runners-up (1973)
Guatemala	Xelajú	1980 Champions	1st	—
Guatemala	Juventud Retalteca	1980 Runners-up	1st	—
Guatemala	Comunicaciones	1980 Third place	9th	Champions (1971)
Guatemala	Suchitepéquez	1980 Fourth place	2nd	First Round (1980)
Honduras	Real España	1980–81 Champions	2nd	Runners-up (1979)
Honduras	Marathón	1980–81 Runners-up	2nd	First Round (1980)
Honduras	Olimpia	1980–81 Third place	2nd	Group stage (1979)
Honduras	Vida	1980–81 Fourth place	1st	—

== First round ==
Team 1	Agg.	Team 2	1st leg	2nd leg
Juventud Retalteca (Guatemala)	2–3	(Honduras) Vida	1–0	1–3
Real España (Honduras)	2–0	(El Salvador) Alianza	1–0	1–0
Atlético Marte (El Salvador)	0–2	(Guatemala) Comunicaciones	0–2	0–0
Santiagueño (El Salvador)	4–5	(Guatemala) Suchitepéquez	2–2	2–3
Olimpia (Honduras)	2–1	(Guatemala) Xelajú	1–0	1–1
Marathón (Honduras)	7–1	(El Salvador) Águila	2–1	5–0

== Second round ==
Team 1	Agg.	Team 2	1st leg	2nd leg
Real España (Honduras)	3–1	(Guatemala) Suchitepéquez	1–0	2–1
Olimpia (Honduras)	2–1	(Guatemala) Comunicaciones	1–1	1–0
Vida (Honduras)	1–2	(Honduras) Marathón	1–1	1–2

== Final Round ==
Pos	Team	Pld	W	D	L	GF	GA	GD	Pts	Qualification or relegation
1	(Honduras) Real España	4	2	2	0	8	5	+3	6	1981 Copa Fraternidad champions
2	(Honduras) Olimpia	4	0	4	0	5	5	0	4	
3	(Honduras) Marathón	4	0	2	2	6	9	−3	2	

Source: [https://www.diez.hn/liganacionaldehonduras/real-espana-campeon-vs-olimpia-marathon-copa-fraternidad-de-uncaf-1981-HIDZ1349086

21 June 1981	Real España (Honduras)	1–1	(Honduras) Olimpia	San Pedro Sula, Honduras
	Pavón		Norales	Stadium: Estadio General Francisco Morazán

25 June 1981	Olimpia (Honduras)	1–1	(Honduras) Marathón	Tegucigalpa, Honduras
	De Moraes		Bailey	Stadium: Estadio Nacional

28 June 1981	Marathón (Honduras)	1–3	(Honduras) Real España	San Pedro Sula, Honduras
	Güity		Espinoza; Bonilla; Barahona	Stadium: Estadio General Francisco Morazán

15 December 1981	Marathón (Honduras)	2–2	(Honduras) Olimpia	San Pedro Sula, Honduras
	Bailey; Villalobos		Fernández	Stadium: Estadio General Francisco Morazán

20 December 1981	Olimpia (Honduras)	1–1	(Honduras) Real España	Tegucigalpa, Honduras
	González		Castro	Stadium: Estadio Nacional

23 December 1981	Real España (Honduras)	3–2	(Honduras) Marathón	San Pedro Sula, Honduras
	Costly; Mathews; Chavarría		Bailey; Güity	Stadium: Estadio General Francisco Morazán

1981 Copa Fraternidad winners

Real España
1st title

== See also ==
- 1981 CONCACAF Champions' Cup
