= 1979 Copa Fraternidad =

Tournament details
- Teams: 12 (from 3 associations)

Final positions
- Champions: (Guatemala) Aurora (2nd title)
- Runners-up: (Honduras) Real España

Tournament statistics
- Matches played: 63
- Goals scored: 159 (2.52 per match)

The Copa Fraternidad 1979 was played in two groups of six teams, the winners of each group decided the title in a double headed. It was the ninth edition of this tournament under this name.

== Teams ==
Association	Team	Qualifying method	App.	Previous best
(El Salvador) El Salvador	FAS	1978–79 Champions	2nd	Second Round (1978)
(El Salvador) El Salvador	Alianza	1978–79 Runners-up	5th	5th (1971, 1974)
(El Salvador) El Salvador	Atlético Marte	1978–79 Third place	4th	4th (1971)
(El Salvador) El Salvador	Santiagueño	1978–79 Fourth place	1st	—
Guatemala	Aurora	1978 Champions	7th	Champions (1976)
Guatemala	Comunicaciones	1978 Runners-up	7th	Champions (1971)
Guatemala	Cobán Imperial	1978 Third place	1st	—
Guatemala	Municipal	1978 Fourth place	7th	Champions (1974, 1977)
Honduras	Motagua	1978–79 Champions	1st	—
Honduras	Real España	1978–79 Runners-up	1st	—
Honduras	Olimpia	1978–79 Third place	1st	—
Honduras	Broncos	1978–79 Fourth place	1st	—

== Group I ==
=== Results ===
Aurora (Guatemala)	1–0	(Guatemala) Municipal
TBD		Nil

11 February 1979
15:00

Olimpia (Honduras)	1–1	(Honduras) Motagua
Rigoberto Gómez 16'		Rigoberto Sosa 22'

Estadio Tiburcio Carías Andino
Referee: José Andino (HON)

Alianza (El Salvador)	2–1	(El Salvador) Santiagueño
TBD; TBD		TBD

Aurora (Guatemala)	1–4	(El Salvador) Santiagueño
TBD		TBD; TBD; TBD; TBD

Municipal (Guatemala)	2–1	(El Salvador) Alianza
TBD; TBD		TBD

Municipal (Guatemala)	1–0	(El Salvador) Santiagueño
TBD		Nil

Aurora (Guatemala)	3–0	(El Salvador) Alianza
TBD; TBD; TBD		Nil

Olimpia (Honduras)	0–1	(Guatemala) Aurora
Nil		TBD

Motagua (Honduras)	1–0	(Guatemala) Municipal
TBD		Nil

Motagua (Honduras)	0–1	(Guatemala) Aurora
Nil		TBD

1979

Olimpia (Honduras)	1–2	(Guatemala) Municipal
Jorge Brand		Lijon León; Armando Melgar

2 March 1979

Motagua (Honduras)	1–1	(El Salvador) Alianza
TBD		TBD

Estadio Nacional, Tegucigalpa
2 March 1979

Olimpia (Honduras)	4–1	(El Salvador) Santiagueño
TBD; TBD; TBD; TBD		TBD

Estadio Nacional, Tegucigalpa
1979

Motagua (Honduras)	0–2	(El Salvador) Santiagueño
Nil		Gilberto Quinteros; Ever Hernández

Estadio Nacional, Teguigalpa

Olimpia (Honduras)	2–0	(El Salvador) Alianza
TBD; TBD		Nil

7 March 1979
20:00

Motagua (Honduras)	1–0	(Honduras) Olimpia
Angel Obando 25'		Nil

Estadio Tiburcio Carías Andino
Referee: José Andino (HON)

Santiagueño (El Salvador)	2–2	(El Salvador) Alianza
TBD; TBD		TBD; TBD

Municipal (Guatemala)	2–1	(Guatemala) Aurora
TBD; TBD		TBD

Santiagueño (El Salvador)	2–3	(Guatemala) Aurora
TBD; TBD		TBD; TBD; TBD

Alianza (El Salvador)	0–0	(Guatemala) Municipal
Nil		Nil

Alianza (El Salvador)	1–0	(Guatemala) Aurora
TBD		Nil

Santiagueño (El Salvador)	0–0	(Guatemala) Municipal
Nil		Nil

Aurora (Guatemala)	0–0	(Honduras) Olimpia
Nil		Nil

Municipal (Guatemala)	0–0	(Honduras) Motagua
Nil		Nil

Municipal (Guatemala)	2–0	(Honduras) Olimpia
TBD; TBD		Nil

Aurora (Guatemala)	4–2	(Honduras) Motagua
TBD; TBD; TBD; TBD		TBD; TBD

Santiagueño (El Salvador)	1–1	(Honduras) Olimpia
TBD		TBD

Alianza (El Salvador)	3–2	(Honduras) Motagua
TBD; TBD; TBD		TBD; TBD

Alianza (El Salvador)	1–4	(Honduras) Olimpia
TBD		TBD; TBD; TBD; TBD

Santiagueño (El Salvador)	4–2	(Honduras) Motagua
TBD; TBD; TBD; TBD		TBD; TBD

=== Standings ===
Pos	Team	Pld	W	D	L	GF	GA	GD	Pts
1	(Guatemala) Aurora	10	6	1	3	15	11	+4	13
2	(Guatemala) Municipal	10	5	3	2	9	5	+4	13
3	(Honduras) Olimpia	10	3	3	4	13	10	+3	9
4	(El Salvador) Santiagueño	10	3	3	4	17	16	+1	9
5	(El Salvador) Alianza	10	3	3	4	11	17	−6	9
6	(Honduras) Motagua	10	2	3	5	10	16	−6	7

=== 1st Place playoff ===
1979

Aurora (Guatemala)	1–1	(Guatemala) Municipal

- Abandoned at 1–1 during second half of extra time; awarded 2–0 Aurora.

== Group II ==
=== Results ===
Comunicaciones (Guatemala)	1–0	(Guatemala) Cobán Imperial
TBD		Nil

Atlético Marte (El Salvador)	2–2	(El Salvador) FAS
TBD; TBD		TBD; TBD

Broncos (Honduras)	2–1	(Honduras) Real España
TBD; TBD		TBD

FAS (El Salvador)	0–0	(Guatemala) Comunicaciones
Nil		Nil

Atlético Marte (El Salvador)	5–1	(Guatemala) Cobán Imperial]
TBD; TBD; TBD; TBD; TBD		TBD

Atlético Marte (El Salvador)	3–2	(Guatemala) Comunicaciones
TBD; TBD; TBD		TBD; TBD

FAS (El Salvador)	0–0	(Guatemala) Cobán Imperial
Nil		Nil

Cobán Imperial (Guatemala)	2–3	(Honduras) Real España
TBD; TBD		TBD; TBD; TBD

Comunicaciones (Guatemala)	0–0	(Honduras) Broncos
Nil		Nil

Comunicaciones (Guatemala)	2–3	(Honduras) ReReal España
TBD; TBD		TBD; TBD; TBD

Cobán Imperial (Guatemala)	1–3	(Honduras) Broncos
TBD		TBD; TBD; TBD

2 March 1979

Atlético Marte (El Salvador)	5–3	(Honduras) Real España
TBD; TBD; TBD; TBD; TBD		TBD; TBD; TBD

Estadio Cuscatlán, San Salvador
2 March 1979

FAS (El Salvador)	1–3	(Honduras) Broncos
TBD		TBD; TBD; TBD

Estadio Óscar Quiteño, Santa Ana
1979

FAS (El Salvador)	0–2	(Honduras) Real España
Nil		Walter Jimminson

4 March 1979

Atlético Marte (El Salvador)	2–0	(Honduras) Broncos
Norberto Huezo; Miguel Martinez		Nil

Estadio Cuscatlan

Real España (Honduras)	1–0	(Honduras) Broncos
TBD		Nil

FAS (El Salvador)	2–1	(El Salvador) Atlético Marte
TBD; TBD		TBD

Cobán Imperial (Guatemala)	1–0	(Guatemala) Comunicaciones
TBD		Nil

Cobán Imperial (Guatemala)	2–1	(El Salvador) Atlético Marte
TBD; TBD		TBD

Comunicaciones (Guatemala)	2–1	(El Salvador) FAS
TBD; TBD		TBD

Cobán Imperial (Guatemala)	1–1	(El Salvador) FAS
TBD		TBD

Comunicaciones (Guatemala)	0–0	(El Salvador) Atlético Marte
Nil		Nil

Broncos (Honduras)	1–2	(Guatemala) Comunicaciones
TBD		TBD; TBD

Real España (Honduras)	2–1	(Guatemala) Cobán Imperial
TBD; TBD		TBD

Real España (Honduras)	1–1	(Guatemala) Comunicaciones
TBD		TBD

Broncos (Honduras)	1–2	(Guatemala) Cobán Imperial
TBD		TBD; TBD

Broncos (Honduras)	0–2	(El Salvador) FAS
Nil		TBD; TBD

Real España (Honduras)	1–1	(El Salvador) Atlético Marte
TBD		TBD

Real España (Honduras)	1–0	(El Salvador) FAS
TBD		Nil

Broncos (Honduras)	0–3	(El Salvador) Atlético Marte
Nil		TBD; TBD; TBD

=== Standings ===
Pos	Team	Pld	W	D	L	GF	GA	GD	Pts
1	(Honduras) Real España	10	6	2	2	18	14	+4	14
2	(El Salvador) Atlético Marte	10	5	3	2	23	13	+10	13
3	(Guatemala) Comunicaciones	10	3	4	3	10	10	0	10
4	(El Salvador) FAS	10	2	4	4	9	12	−3	8
5	(Guatemala) Cobán Imperial	10	3	2	5	11	17	−6	8
6	(Honduras) Broncos	10	3	1	6	10	15	−5	7

== Final ==
8 April 1979

Aurora (Guatemala)	1–0	(Honduras) Real España
Ramon Ramírez		Nil

Estadio Mateo Flores
1979

Real España (Honduras)	0–0	(Guatemala) Aurora
Nil		Nil

== Champion ==
1979 Copa Fraternidad champion

Aurora
2nd title
