= 1977 Copa Fraternidad =

Tournament details
- Teams: 7 (from 3 associations)

Final positions
- Champions: (Guatemala) Municipal (2nd title)
- Runners-up: (Guatemala) Comunicaciones

Tournament statistics
- Matches played: 42
- Goals scored: 111 (2.64 per match)

The 1977 Copa Fraternidad was the 7th edition of the Central American club championship. Guatemalan side C.S.D. Municipal conquered its 2nd title.

== Teams ==
Association	Team	Qualifying method	App.	Previous best
(Costa Rica) Costa Rica	Saprissa	1975–76 Champions	7th	Champions (1972, 1973)
(Costa Rica) Costa Rica	Deportivo México	1975–76 Runners-up	1st	—
(El Salvador) El Salvador	Águila	1976–77 Champions	4th	Runners-up (1973)
(El Salvador) El Salvador	Once Municipal	1976–77 Runners-up	1st	—
Guatemala	Municipal	1976 Champions	5th	Champions (1974)
Guatemala	Comunicaciones	1976 Runners-up	5th	Champions (1971)
Guatemala	Aurora	Title holder	5th	Champions (1976)

== Standings ==
Pos	Team	Pld	W	D	L	GF	GA	GD	Pts	Result
1	(Guatemala) Municipal	12	7	4	1	17	10	+7	18	1977 Copa Fraternidad champions
2	(Guatemala) Comunicaciones	12	3	8	1	22	15	+7	14	
3	(El Salvador) Águila	12	6	2	4	20	15	+5	14	
4	(Costa Rica) Deportivo México	12	5	3	4	15	15	0	13	
5	(Guatemala) Aurora	12	4	3	5	11	13	−2	11	
6	(Costa Rica) Saprissa	12	2	6	4	12	13	−1	10	
7	(El Salvador) Once Municipal	12	1	2	9	14	30	−16	4	

== Results ==
Home \ Away	ÁGU	AUR	COM	MEX	MUN	ONC	SAP
Águila		2–1	2–2	2–1	2–1	1–0	3–0
Aurora	1–0		0–2	1–0	1–1	3–1	0–0
Comunicaciones	3–1	1–1		1–1	1–2	4–0	1–1
Deportivo México	1–0	1–0	2–2		1–1	2–1	2–1
Municipal	2–1	1–0	2–2	1–0		1–0	1–0
Once Municipal	3–6	2–3	2–2	1–3	1–3		2–2
Saprissa	0–0	2–0	1–1	4–1	1–1	0–1	

Source: RSSSF
Legend: Blue = home team win; Yellow = draw; Red = away team win.

Municipal (Guatemala)	1-0	(Guatemala) Aurora
TBD		Nil

Saprissa (Costa Rica)	1-1	(Guatemala) Comunicaciones
TBD		TBD

Aurora (Guatemala)	1-0	(Costa Rica) Deportivo México
TBD		Nil

Deportivo México (Costa Rica)	1-1	(Guatemala) Municipal
TBD		TBD

Saprissa (Costa Rica)	2-0	(Guatemala) Aurora
TBD; TBD		Nil

Comunicaciones (Guatemala)	1-1	(Costa Rica) Deportivo México
TBD		TBD

Deportivo México (Costa Rica)	2-1	(Costa Rica) Saprissa
TBD; TBD		TBD

Municipal (Guatemala)	1-0	(Costa Rica) Saprissa
TBD		Nil

Deportivo México (Costa Rica)	2-1	(El Salvador) Once Municipal
TBD; TBD		TBD

Comunicaciones (Guatemala)	1-1	(Guatemala) Aurora
TBD		TBD

Saprissa (Costa Rica)	0 - 1	(El Salvador) Once Municipal
Nil		TBD

Municipal (Guatemala)	2-2	(Guatemala) Comunicaciones
TBD; TBD		TBD; TBD

Municipal (Guatemala)	1-0	(El Salvador) Once Municipal
TBD		Nil

Deportivo México (Costa Rica)	1-0	(El Salvador) Águila
TBD		Nil

Once Municipal (El Salvador)	2-3	(Guatemala) Aurora
TBD; TBD		TBD; TBD; TBD

Saprissa (Costa Rica)	0 - 0	(El Salvador) Águila
Nil		Nil

Comunicaciones (Guatemala)	3-1	(El Salvador) Águila
TBD; TBD		TBD

Aurora (Guatemala)	1-0	(El Salvador) Águila
TBD		Nil

Águila (El Salvador)	1-0	(El Salvador) Once Municipal
TBD		Nil

Comunicaciones (Guatemala)	4-0	(El Salvador) Once Municipal
TBD; TBD; TBD		Nil

Municipal (Guatemala)	2-1	(El Salvador) Águila
TBD; TBD		TBD

Once Municipal (El Salvador)	1-3	(Costa Rica) Deportivo México
TBD		TBD; TBD

6 March 1977

Aurora (Guatemala)	0-2	(Guatemala) Comunicaciones
Nil		TBD; TBD

Once Municipal (El Salvador)	3-6	(El Salvador) Águila
TBD; TBD		TBD; TBD; TBD; TBD

9 March 1977

Comunicaciones (Guatemala)	1-2	(Guatemala) Municipal
TBD		TBD; TBD

Aurora (Guatemala)	0 - 0	(Costa Rica) Saprissa
Nil		Nil

Once Municipal (El Salvador)	1-3	(Guatemala) Municipal
TBD		TBD; TBD

Águila (El Salvador)	2-1	(Guatemala) Aurora
TBD; TBD		TBD

Deportivo México (Costa Rica)	1-4	(Costa Rica) Saprissa
TBD		TBD; TBD; TBD

Municipal (Guatemala)	1-0	(Costa Rica) Deportivo México
TBD		Nil

Comunicaciones (Guatemala)	1-1	(Costa Rica) Saprissa
TBD		TBD

Águila (El Salvador)	2-1	(Costa Rica) Deportivo México
TBD; TBD		TBD

Deportivo México (Costa Rica)	2-2	(Guatemala) Comunicaciones
TBD; TBD		TBD; TBD

Aurora (Guatemala)	1-1	(Guatemala) Municipal
TBD		TBD

Aguila (El Salvador)	3-0	(Costa Rica) Saprissa
TBD; TBD		Nil

Once Municipal (El Salvador)	2-2	(Costa Rica) Saprissa
TBD; TBD		TBD; TBD

Saprissa (Costa Rica)	1-1	(Guatemala) Municipal
TBD		TBD

Aurora (Guatemala)	3-1	(El Salvador) Once Municipal
TBD; TBD		TBD

Aguila (El Salvador)	2 - 2	(Guatemala) Comunicaciones
TBD; TBD		TBD; TBD

Once Municipal (El Salvador)	2 - 2	(Guatemala) Comunicaciones
TBD; TBD		TBD; TBD

Deportivo México (Costa Rica)	1-0	(Guatemala) Aurora
TBD		Nil

Águila (El Salvador)	2-1	(Guatemala) Municipal
TBD; TBD		TBD
