= 1978 Copa Fraternidad =

Tournament details
- Teams: 12 (from 3 associations)

Final positions
- Champions: (Costa Rica) Saprissa (3rd title)
- Runners-up: (Costa Rica) Cartaginés

The 1978 Copa Fraternidad was the 8th edition of the Copa Fraternidad, the football competition for Central American clubs organized by UNCAF. Costa Rican club Deportivo Saprissa obtained its 3rd regional title after winning the final round.

== Teams ==
Association	Team	Qualifying method	App.	Previous best
(Costa Rica) Costa Rica	Saprissa	1976–77 Champions	8th	Champions (1972, 1973)
(Costa Rica) Costa Rica	Cartaginés	1976–77 Runners-up	3rd	5th (1976)
(Costa Rica) Costa Rica	Herediano	1976–77 Third place	4th	3rd (1971, 1975)
(Costa Rica) Costa Rica	Deportivo México	1976–77 Fourth place	2nd	4th (1977)
(El Salvador) El Salvador	FAS	1977–78 Champions	1st	—
(El Salvador) El Salvador	Once Municipal	1977–78 Runners-up	2nd	7th (1977)
(El Salvador) El Salvador	Atlético Marte	1977–78 Third place	3rd	4th (1971)
(El Salvador) El Salvador	Juventud Olímpica	1977–78 Fourth place	3rd	5th (1973)
Guatemala	Comunicaciones	1977 Champions	6th	Champions (1971)
Guatemala	Municipal	1977 Runners-up	6th	Champions (1974, 1977)
Guatemala	Aurora	1977 Third place	6th	Champions (1976)
Guatemala	Tiquisate	1977 Fourth place	1st	—

== First round ==
Aurora (Guatemala)	1–1	(Costa Rica) Saprissa
TBD		TBD

Saprissa (Costa Rica)	2–0	(Guatemala) Aurora
TBD; TBD		Nil

- Saprissa advanced 3–1 on aggregate.

Herediano (Costa Rica)	0–0	(El Salvador) FAS
Nil		Nil

FAS (El Salvador)	2–0	(Costa Rica) Herediano
TBD; TBD		Nil

- FAS advanced 2–0 on aggregate.

Municipal (Guatemala)	0–0	(Costa Rica) Barrio México
Nil		Nil

Barrio México (Costa Rica)	1–1	(Guatemala) Municipal
TBD		TBD

- Barrio México 1–1 Municipal on aggregate. Barrio México won 3–1 on penalty shoot-outs

Cartaginés (Costa Rica)	1–0	(El Salvador) Juventud Olímpica
TBD		Nil

Juventud Olímpica (El Salvador)	1–0	(Costa Rica) Cartaginés
TBD		Nil

- Cartaginés 1–1 Juventud Olímpica on aggregate. Cartaginés won 5–4 on penalty shoot-outs

Once Municipal (El Salvador)	1–2	(Guatemala) Tiquisate
TBD		TBD; TBD

Tiquisate (Guatemala)	0–0	(El Salvador) Once Municipal
Nil		Nil

- Tiquisate advanced 2–1 on aggregate.

Atlético Marte (El Salvador)	0–2	(Guatemala) Comunicaciones
Nil		Nil

Comunicaciones (Guatemala)	1–0	(El Salvador) Atlético Marte
TBD		Nil

- Comunicaciones advanced 3–0 on aggregate.

== Second round ==
Apparently Saprissa, Cartaginés and Comunicaciones eliminated FAS, Barrio México and Tiquisate in a semifinal round.

== Final round ==
Pos	Team	Pld	W	D	L	GF	GA	GD	Pts	Result
1	(Costa Rica) Saprissa	4	3	0	1	7	3	+4	6	1978 Copa Fraternidad champions
2	(Costa Rica) Cartaginés	4	1	1	2	2	3	−1	3	
3	(Guatemala) Comunicaciones	4	1	1	2	4	7	−3	3	

Comunicaciones (Guatemala)	0–0	(Costa Rica) Cartaginés
Nil		Nil

Cartaginés (Costa Rica)	0–1	(Costa Rica) Saprissa
Nil		TBD

Saprissa (Costa Rica)	4–1	(Guatemala) Comunicaciones
TBD; TBD; TBD; TBD		TBD

Cartaginés (Costa Rica)	2–1	(Guatemala) Comunicaciones
TBD; TBD		TBD

Saprissa (Costa Rica)	1–0	(Costa Rica) Cartaginés
TBD		Nil

Comunicaciones (Guatemala)	2–1	(Costa Rica) Saprissa
TBD; TBD		TBD

== Champion ==
1979 Copa Fraternidad Champion

Saprissa
3rd title
