= 1974 Copa Fraternidad =

Tournament details
- Teams: 6 (from 3 associations)

Final positions
- Champions: (Guatemala) Municipal (1st title)
- Runners-up: (Costa Rica) Saprissa

Tournament statistics
- Matches played: 30
- Goals scored: 61 (2.03 per match)
- Top scorer(s): Carlos Solano and Marco Fion (5 goals)

The 1974 Copa Fraternidad was the fourth Central American club championship played between 6 clubs. C.S.D. Municipal won the tournament.

== Teams ==
| Association | Team | Qualifying method | App. | Previous best |
|---|---|---|---|---|
| (Costa Rica) Costa Rica | Saprissa | 1972–73 Champions | 4th | Champions (1972, 1973) |
| (Costa Rica) Costa Rica | Cartaginés | 1972–73 Runners-up | 1st | — |
| (El Salvador) El Salvador | Alianza ^{1} | 1973 Runners-up | 3rd | 5th (1971) |
| (El Salvador) El Salvador | Águila | 1973 Fifth place | 2nd | Runners-up (1973) |
| Guatemala | Municipal | 1973 Champions | 3rd | 6th (1973) |
| Guatemala | Aurora | 1973 Runners-up | 2nd | Runners-up (1972) |

^{1} Juventud Olímpica were the 1973 Primera División champion and were originally slated to compete however due to financial issue. The club declined the option to participate. FAS and Alianza played a game to determine the winner, Alianza prevailed winning 2-1.

== Results ==
January 8, 1974

| Municipal (Guatemala) | 2 - 0 | (El Salvador) Alianza |
|---|---|---|
| Benjamín Monterroso 37'; Miguel Angel Cobian | | Nil |

Estadio Doroteo Guamuch Flores, Ciudad de Guatemala
January 8, 1974

| Saprissa (Costa Rica) | 3 - 1 | (Guatemala) Aurora |
|---|---|---|
| Asdrúbal Paniagua; Fernando Hernandez; Gerardo Solano | | Melendez |

January 8, 1974

| Aguila (El Salvador) | 1 - 0 | (Costa Rica) Cartaginés |
|---|---|---|
| JJ Polio 44' | | Nil |

Estadio Jorge "Mágico" González, San Salvador
January 10, 1974

| Aurora (Guatemala) | 1 - 0 | (El Salvador) Aguila |
|---|---|---|
| Marco Fión 33' (pen.) | | Nil |

Estadio Doroteo Guamuch Flores, Ciudad de Guatemala
January 10, 1974

| Cartaginés (Costa Rica) | 1 - 1 | (Guatemala) Municipal |
|---|---|---|
| Leonel Fernandez 34' (pen.) | | Julio César Anderson 75' |

Estadio Nacional de Costa Rica, San José
Referee: JW Polio
January 10, 1974

| Alianza (El Salvador) | 0 - 1 | (Costa Rica) Saprissa |
|---|---|---|
| Nil | | Carlos Solano |

Estadio Jorge "Mágico" González, San Salvador
Referee: Romulo Mendez

| Aguila (El Salvador) | 1 - 1 | (Costa Rica) Saprissa |
|---|---|---|
| TBD | | TBD |

| Cartaginés (Costa Rica) | 1 - 1 | (El Salvador) Alianza |
|---|---|---|
| Jorge Indio Vasquez (o.g.) | | TBD |

| Cartaginés (Costa Rica) | 0 - 0 | (Costa Rica) Saprissa |
|---|---|---|
| Nil | | Nil |

| Municipal (Guatemala) | 3 - 2 | (El Salvador) Aguila |
|---|---|---|
| TBD; TBD | | TBD; TBD |

Estadio Doroteo Guamuch Flores, Ciudad de Guatemala
January 1974

| Alianza (El Salvador) | 0 - 0 | (Guatemala) Aurora |
|---|---|---|
| Nil | | Nil |

Estadio Jorge "Mágico" González, San Salvador

| Saprissa (Costa Rica) | 3 - 0 | (Guatemala) Municipal |
|---|---|---|
| TBD; TBD | | Nil |

| Aurora (Guatemala) | 2 - 0 | (Costa Rica) Cartaginés |
|---|---|---|
| TBD; TBD | | Nil |

February 3, 1974

| Aguila (El Salvador) | 2 - 1 | (El Salvador) Alianza |
|---|---|---|
| Luis Ramírez Zapata | | José Luis Bracamonte |

February 7, 1974

| Municipal (Guatemala) | 2 - 1 | (Guatemala) Aurora |
|---|---|---|
| Julio César Anderson 41'; Miguel Angel Cobian 70' | | Marco Fión 80' |

| Aurora (Guatemala) | 0 - 1 | (Costa Rica) Saprissa |
|---|---|---|
| Nil | | TBD |

| Alianza (El Salvador) | 0 - 0 | (Guatemala) Municipal |
|---|---|---|
| Nil | | Nil |

Estadio Jorge "Mágico" González, San Salvador
13 February 1974

| Cartaginés (Costa Rica) | 0 - 2 | (El Salvador) Aguila |
|---|---|---|
| Nil | | Helio Rodriguez; Luis Rivas |

February 18, 1974

| Municipal (Guatemala) | 2 - 1 | (Costa Rica) Cartaginés |
|---|---|---|
| Armando Melgar 3'; Leonardo Mcnish 8' | | Lijon León (o.g.) |

Referee: Jose leonidas rozel
17 February 1974

| Aguila (El Salvador) | 0 - 2 | (Guatemala) Aurora |
|---|---|---|
| Nil | | Omar Sanzongni; Rene Morales |

Estadio Jorge "Mágico" González, San Salvador
18 February 1974

| Saprissa (Costa Rica) | 1 - 1 | (El Salvador) Alianza |
|---|---|---|
| Asdrubal Panguia | | Miguel Hermosillo |

February 20, 1974

| Aurora (Guatemala) | 1 - 2 | (Guatemala) Municipal |
|---|---|---|
| TBD | | TBD; TBD |

24 February 1974

| Aguila (El Salvador) | 0 - 1 | (Guatemala) Municipal |
|---|---|---|
| Nil | | Raúl Benítez |

| Saprissa (Costa Rica) | 2 - 1 | (Costa Rica) Cartaginés |
|---|---|---|
| TBD; TBD | | TBD |

Estadio Ricardo Saprissa, San José

| Aurora (Guatemala) | 1 - 1 | (El Salvador) Alianza |
|---|---|---|
| Marco Fión | | Juan Ramón Martínez |

| Cartaginés (Costa Rica) | 2 - 1 | (Guatemala) Aurora |
|---|---|---|
| TBD; TBD | | Marco Fión |

March 3, 1974

| Saprissa (Costa Rica) | 2 - 0 | (El Salvador) Aguila |
|---|---|---|
| Carlos Solano | | Nil |

Estadio Nacional de Costa Rica, San Jose
March 3, 1974

| Alianza (El Salvador) | 3 - 0 | (Costa Rica) Cartaginés |
|---|---|---|
| Manuel Cañada; Coreas | | Nil |

Estadio Jorge "Mágico" González, San Salvador

| Alianza (El Salvador) | 1 - 2 | (El Salvador) Aguila |
|---|---|---|
| TBD | | TBD; TBD |

March 11, 1974

| Municipal (Guatemala) | 1 - 0 | (Costa Rica) Saprissa |
|---|---|---|
| Miguel Angel Cobian | | Nil |

Estadio Doroteo Guamuch Flores, Ciudad de Guatemala

=== Standings ===
| Pos | Team | Pld | W | D | L | GF | GA | GD | Pts |
|---|---|---|---|---|---|---|---|---|---|
| 1 | (Guatemala) Municipal | 10 | 7 | 2 | 1 | 14 | 9 | +5 | 16 |
| 2 | (Costa Rica) Saprissa | 10 | 6 | 3 | 1 | 14 | 5 | +9 | 15 |
| 3 | (El Salvador) Águila | 10 | 4 | 1 | 5 | 10 | 11 | −1 | 9 |
| 4 | (Guatemala) Aurora | 10 | 3 | 2 | 5 | 10 | 11 | −1 | 8 |
| 5 | (El Salvador) Alianza | 10 | 1 | 5 | 4 | 7 | 10 | −3 | 7 |
| 6 | (Costa Rica) Cartaginés | 10 | 1 | 3 | 6 | 6 | 15 | −9 | 5 |

== Top Scorer ==
| No. | Player | Club | Goals |
|---|---|---|---|
| 1 | (Costa Rica) Carlos Solano | Saprissa | 5 |
| 2 | (Guatemala) Marco Fión | Aurora | 5 |
| 3 | (Guatemala) Julio César Anderson | Municipal | 4 |

== Champion ==
1974 Copa Fraternidad champion

1st title
