= 1971 Copa Fraternidad =

Tournament details
- Teams: 6 (from 3 associations)

Final positions
- Champions: (Guatemala) Comunicaciones (1st title)
- Runners-up: (Costa Rica) Saprissa

Tournament statistics
- Matches played: 30
- Goals scored: 68 (2.27 per match)

The Copa Fraternidad 1971 was the first Central American club championship played between six clubs, two from Costa Rica, two from El Salvador and two from Guatemala. This was the first edition under this format.

== Teams ==
Association	Team	Qualifying method	App.	Coach	Captain
(Costa Rica) Costa Rica	Saprissa	1970 Runners-up	1st	(Costa Rica) Marvin Rodríguez	TBD
(Costa Rica) Costa Rica	Herediano	1970 Third place	1st	TBD	TBD
(El Salvador) El Salvador	Atlético Marte	1970 Champions	1st	TBD	TBD
(El Salvador) El Salvador	Alianza	1970 Fourth place	1st	TBD	TBD
Guatemala	Comunicaciones	1970–71 Champions	1st	Walter Ormeño	TBD
Guatemala	Cementos Novella	1970–71 Fifth place	1st	TBD	TBD

== Standings ==
Pos	Team	Pld	W	D	L	GF	GA	GD	Pts	Qualification
1	(Guatemala) Comunicaciones	10	5	4	1	15	9	+6	14	Winners
2	(Costa Rica) Saprissa	10	2	7	1	10	7	+3	11	
3	(Costa Rica) Herediano	10	4	3	3	12	10	+2	11	
4	(El Salvador) Atlético Marte	10	3	3	4	12	12	0	9	
5	(El Salvador) Alianza	10	3	2	5	9	14	−5	8	
6	(Guatemala) Cementos Novella	10	3	1	6	10	16	−6	7	

Updated to match(es) played on 1971. Source: RSSSF
Rules for classification: 1) Points; 2) Goal difference; 3) Goals scored.

== Results ==
7 December 1970

Comunicaciones (Guatemala)	1 – 1	(Costa Rica) Saprissa
Nelson Melgar		Carlos Solano

Estadio Doroteo Guamuch Flores, Ciudad de Guatemala
Referee: Desiderio Avedano
7 December 1970

Alianza (El Salvador)	2 – 1	(Guatemala) Cementos Novella
Mauricio Gonzalez; Óscar Armando Cortéz Sandoval		Haroldo Cordón

Estadio Jorge "Magico" Gonzalez, San Salvador
Referee: Luis Paulino Siles
9 December 1970

Cementos Novella (Guatemala)	1 – 0	(Costa Rica) Herediano
David Cordón		Nil

Estadio Doroteo Guamuch Flores, Ciudad de Guatemala
15 December 1970

Atlético Marte (El Salvador)	1 – 1	(Guatemala) Comunicaciones
Odir Jacques		Héctor Tambasco

Estadio Jorge "Magico" Gonzalez, San Salvador
Referee: Eladio Molina
15 December 1970

Saprissa (Costa Rica)	3 – 0	(El Salvador) Alianza
Luis Aguilar; Jimmy Grant		Nil

Estadio Nacional 1924, San Jose
December 18, 1971

Herediano (Costa Rica)	2 – 1	(El Salvador) Atlético Marte
TBD; Mendoza		Odir Jacques

Estadio Nacional 1924, San Jose
21 December 1970

Comunicaciones (Guatemala)	3 – 2	(Guatemala) Cementos Novella
Hugo Torres Ocampo; Oscar Molina; Héctor Tambasco		Carlos Soto; Haroldo Cordón

Estadio Doroteo Guamuch Flores, Ciudad de Guatemala
21 December 1970

Alianza (El Salvador)	1 – 0	(Costa Rica) Herediano
Nilton Rodarte		Nil

Estadio Jorge "Magico" Gonzalez, San Salvador
21 December 1970

Saprissa (Costa Rica)	0 – 0	(El Salvador) Atlético Marte
Nil		Nil

Estadio Nacional 1924, San Jose
6 January 1971

Comunicaciones (Guatemala)	0 – 0	(El Salvador) Alianza
Nil		Nil

Estadio Doroteo Guamuch Flores, Ciudad de Guatemala
6 January 1971

Atlético Marte (El Salvador)	3 – 0	(Guatemala) Cementos Novella
Elenilson Franco; Manuel de Jesus Canadas		Nil

Estadio Jorge "Magico" Gonzalez, San Salvador

Cementos Novella (Guatemala)	0 – 1	(Costa Rica) Saprissa
Nil		TBD

Estadio Doroteo Guamuch Flores, Ciudad de Guatemala
14 January 1971

Alianza (El Salvador)	3 – 0	(El Salvador) Atlético Marte
Salvador Flamenco; Mauricio Gonzalez; Jaime Portillo		Nil

Estadio Jorge "Magico" Gonzalez, San Salvador

Herediano (Costa Rica)	2 – 1	(Guatemala) Comunicaciones
TBD; TBD		TBD

Estadio Nacional 1924, San Jose

Herediano (Costa Rica)	1 – 1	(Costa Rica) Saprissa
TBD		TBD

Estadio Nacional 1924, San Jose

January 18, 1971

Cementos Novella (Guatemala)	2 – 0	(El Salvador) Alianza
TBD; TBD		Nil

Estadio Doroteo Guamuch Flores, Ciudad de Guatemala
January 18, 1971

Atlético Marte (El Salvador)	1 – 1	(Costa Rica) Herediano
Alberto Villalta		TBD

Estadio Jorge "Magico" Gonzalez, San Salvador
January 18, 1971

Saprissa (Costa Rica)	1 – 1	(Guatemala) Comunicaciones
TBD		TBD

Estadio Nacional 1924, San Jose

Comunicaciones (Guatemala)	2 – 1	(El Salvador) Atlético Marte
TBD; TBD		TBD

Estadio Doroteo Guamuch Flores, Ciudad de Guatemala

Alianza (El Salvador)	0 – 0	(Costa Rica) Saprissa
Nil		Nil

Estadio Jorge "Magico" Gonzalez, San Salvador
24 January 1971

Herediano (Costa Rica)	3 – 0	(Guatemala) Cementos Novella
Reynaldo Mullings; Álvaro Cascante		Nil

Estadio Nacional 1924, San Jose

Cementos Novella (Guatemala)	0 – 1	(Guatemala) Comunicaciones
Nil		TBD

Estadio Doroteo Guamuch Flores, Ciudad de Guatemala
February 1, 1971

Atlético Marte (El Salvador)	1 – 0	(Costa Rica) Saprissa
Odir Jacques		Nil

Estadio Jorge "Magico" Gonzalez, San Salvador
February 1, 1971

Herediano (Costa Rica)	2 – 1	(El Salvador) Alianza
José Antonio Mendoza; Álvaro Cascante		Mario "El Chino" Flores

Estadio Nacional 1924, San Jose
February 5, 1971

Atlético Marte (El Salvador)	3 – 1	(El Salvador) Alianza
Manuel Canadas; Odir Jacques; Alberto Villalta		Guido Alvarado

Estadio Jorge "Magico" Gonzalez, San Salvador

Saprissa (Costa Rica)	1 – 1	(Costa Rica) Herediano
TBD		TBD

Estadio Nacional 1924, San Jose
February 9, 1971

Cementos Novella (Guatemala)	2 – 1	(El Salvador) Atlético Marte
Mario Valdez		Sergio Méndez

Estadio Doroteo Guamuch Flores, Ciudad de Guatemala
February 9, 1971

Alianza (El Salvador)	1 – 3	(Guatemala) Comunicaciones
Nilton Rodarte		Petronilo Acosta; Nelson Melgar; Héctor Tambasco

Estadio Jorge "Magico" Gonzalez, San Salvador

Comunicaciones (Guatemala)	2 – 0	(Costa Rica) Herediano
TBD; TBD		Nil

Estadio Doroteo Guamuch Flores, Ciudad de Guatemala

Saprissa (Costa Rica)	2 – 2	(Guatemala) Cementos Novella
TBD; TBD		TBD; TBD

Estadio Nacional 1924, San Jose

== Champion ==
1971 Copa Fraternidad champion

1st title
