= UNCAF Interclub Cup =

- Organizer(s): UNCAF
- Founded: 1999
- Abolished: 2007
- Region: Central America
- Teams: 16
- Last champion(s): (Honduras) Motagua (1st title) (2007)
- Most championships: (Honduras) Olimpia (Guatemala) Municipal (Costa Rica) Alajuelense (2 titles each)
- Website: uncafut.com

The UNCAF Interclub Cup was an annual international football competition held in the UNCAF region (Central America). The competition was open to the leading domestic club teams in the region. The winners of each national league qualified automatically. It also provided qualification places for the CONCACAF Champions' Cup, to which the top three teams advanced. Starting in 2008, all of the Central American nations had one or two teams qualifying directly to the expanded CONCACAF Champions Cup, thus this tournament ceased to be played.

This tournament replaced former friendly competitions such as the Copa Fraternidad (1971–1983) and the Torneo Grandes de Centroamérica (1996–1998).

In 2016, a new women's tournament was introduced.

== All-time table ==
- From 1999 to 2007; only the top 10 are shown.

Pos	Team	Pld	W	D	L	GF	GA	GD	Pts
1	(Costa Rica) Alajuelense	57	31	16	10	118	47	+71	109
2	(Honduras) Olimpia	54	29	14	11	87	39	+48	101
3	(Costa Rica) Saprissa	53	28	14	11	82	47	+35	98
4	(Guatemala) Municipal	44	22	12	10	93	42	+51	78
5	(Honduras) Motagua	24	11	7	6	30	25	+5	40
6	(Guatemala) Comunicaciones	36	11	7	18	56	59	−3	40
7	(El Salvador) FAS	23	12	3	8	55	26	+29	39
8	(Honduras) Real España	16	6	6	4	28	20	+8	24
9	(Panama) Árabe Unido	18	7	3	8	39	32	+7	24
10	(Costa Rica) Puntarenas	12	6	4	2	21	7	+14	22

== Results ==
=== By season ===
Season	Champions	Runners-up	Third place	Fourth place
1999	(Honduras) Olimpia	(Costa Rica) Alajuelense	(Costa Rica) Saprissa	(Guatemala) Comunicaciones
1999	No final match was held. The championship was decided by a final round.			
2000	(Honduras) Olimpia	(Costa Rica) Alajuelense	(Honduras) Real España	(Guatemala) Municipal
2000	No final match was held. The championship was decided by a final round.			
2001	(Guatemala) Municipal	(Costa Rica) Saprissa	(Honduras) Olimpia	(Guatemala) Comunicaciones
2001	No final match was held. The championship was decided by a final round.			
2002	(Costa Rica) Alajuelense	(Panama) Árabe Unido	(Honduras) Motagua	(Guatemala) Comunicaciones
2002	No final match was held. The championship was decided by a final round.			
2003	(Costa Rica) Saprissa	(Guatemala) Comunicaciones	(Costa Rica) Alajuelense	(Guatemala) Municipal
2003	One leg: Comunicaciones 2–3 Saprissa.			
2004	(Guatemala) Municipal	(Costa Rica) Saprissa	(Honduras) Olimpia	(El Salvador) FAS
2004	No final match was held. The championship was decided by a final round.			
2005	(Costa Rica) Alajuelense	(Honduras) Olimpia	(Costa Rica) Saprissa	(Costa Rica) Pérez Zeledón
2005	1st leg: Olimpia 0–1 Alajuelense; 2nd leg: Alajuelense 0–1 Olimpia; Alajuelense won 4–2 on penalties.			
2006	(Costa Rica) Puntarenas	(Honduras) Olimpia	(Guatemala) Marquense	(Honduras) Victoria
2006	1st leg: Puntarenas 3–2 Olimpia; 2nd leg: Olimpia 1–0 Puntarenas; Puntarenas won 3–1 on penalties.			
2007	(Honduras) Motagua	(Costa Rica) Saprissa	(Guatemala) Municipal	(Costa Rica) Alajuelense
2007	1st leg: Saprissa 1–1 Motagua; 2nd leg: Motagua 1–0 Saprissa.			

=== By club ===
Club	Winners	Runners-up	Years won	Years runner-up
(Honduras) Olimpia	2	2	1999, 2000	2005, 2006
(Costa Rica) Alajuelense	2	2	2002, 2005	1999, 2000
(Guatemala) Municipal	2	0	2001, 2004	—
(Costa Rica) Saprissa	1	3	2003	2001, 2004, 2007
(Costa Rica) Puntarenas	1	0	2006	—
(Honduras) Motagua	1	0	2007	—

=== By country ===
Nation	Winners	Runners-up	Winning clubs	Runner-up clubs
Costa Rica	4	5	Alajuelense (2), Saprissa (1), Puntarenas (1)	Saprissa (3), Alajuelense (2)
Honduras	3	2	Olimpia (2), Motagua (1)	Olimpia (2)
Guatemala	2	0	Municipal (2)	—

== Women's tournament ==
In 2016, the Central American Football Union revived the competition by inaugurating a tournament open to women's clubs. Costa Rican side Moravia obtained the first tournament contested in Costa Rica. As opposed to the men's cup, this tournament is played in a fixed host.

== See also ==
- CONCACAF League
- CONCACAF Central American Cup
