= 1976 Copa Fraternidad =

Tournament details
- Teams: 7 (from 3 associations)

Final positions
- Champions: (Guatemala) Aurora (1st title)
- Runners-up: (Guatemala) Comunicaciones

Tournament statistics
- Matches played: 39
- Goals scored: 105 (2.69 per match)
- Top scorer: Hugo Ottensen (8 goals)

The Copa Fraternidad 1976 was the sixth Central American club championship played between 7 clubs.

== Teams ==
Association	Team	Qualifying method	App.	Previous best	Coach	Captain
(Costa Rica) Costa Rica	Saprissa	1974–75 Champions	6th	Champions (1972, 1973)	(Costa Rica) Marvin Rodríguez	TBD
(Costa Rica) Costa Rica	Cartaginés	1974–75 Runners-up	2nd	6th (1974)	TBD	TBD
(El Salvador) El Salvador	Águila	1975–76 Champions	3rd	Runners-up (1973)	(El Salvador) Conrado Miranda	TBD
(El Salvador) El Salvador	Alianza	1975–76 Runners-up	4th	5th (1971, 1974)	(Argentina) Mario Rey	TBD
(El Salvador) El Salvador	Platense	Title holder	2nd	Champions (1975)	(Guatemala) Jorge Roldán	TBD
Guatemala	Aurora	1975 Champions	4th	Runners-up (1972, 1975)	TBD	TBD
Guatemala	Comunicaciones	1975 Runners-up	4th	Champions (1971)	(Uruguay) Rubén Amorín	TBD

== Results ==
February 25, 1976

Aurora (Guatemala)	2 - 2	(El Salvador) Alianza
Omar Sanzogni		Hugo Ottensen

Doroteo Guamuch Flores Stadium, Guatemala City
February 26, 1976

Águila (El Salvador)	1 - 1	(Costa Rica) Cartaginés
Ismael Díaz		Alfredo Piedra

Estadio Flor Blanca
Referee: Romulo Mendez
February 26, 1976

Saprissa (Costa Rica)	1 - 0	(Guatemala) Comunicaciones
TBD		Nil

Estadio Ricardo Saprissa
February 26, 1976

Platense (El Salvador)	0 - 2	(Guatemala) Aurora
Nil		Selvin Pennant; Omar Sanzogni

Estadio Flor Blanca, San Salvador
March 1, 1976

Águila (El Salvador)	1 - 3	(Guatemala) Aurora
Felix Pineda		Maco Fion; Selvin Pennant

Estadio Cuscatlan, San Salvador
March 1, 1976

Saprissa (Costa Rica)	0-0	(Costa Rica) Cartaginés
Nil		Nil

Estadio Ricardo Saprissa
March 1, 1976

Comunicaciones (Guatemala)	3 - 0	(El Salvador) Alianza
Raúl Cocherari 5'; Leon Ugarte 38'; Felix McDonald		Nil

Doroteo Guamuch Flores Stadium, Guatemala City
March 3, 1976

Águila (El Salvador)	2 - 3	(El Salvador) Platense
Félix Pineda		Gustavo Guerrero 5'; Rafael Bucaro 17'; Fernando Montero 43'

March 7, 1976

Platense (El Salvador)	3 - 1	(El Salvador) Alianza
Fernando Montero 17'; Rafael Bucaro; Norberto Zaffanella		Hugo Ottensen 46'

Estadio Cuscatlan, San Salvador
March 7, 1976

Comunicaciones (Guatemala)	4 - 1	(El Salvador) Águila
Joaquin Mcdonald; Oscar Sanchez		Cisco Diaz 46'

Doroteo Guamuch Flores Stadium, Guatemala City
March 7, 1976

Cartaginés (Costa Rica)	0 - 3	(Guatemala) Aurora
Nil		TBD; TBD

Estadio Fello Meza, Costa Rica
March 11, 1976

Alianza (El Salvador)	2 - 1	(Costa Rica) Saprissa
Juan Ramón Martínez		Gerardo Solano

Estadio Flor Blanca, San Salvador
March 11, 1976

Comunicaciones (Guatemala)	1 - 1	(El Salvador) Platense
Leon Ugarte		Luis Condomi

Doroteo Guamuch Flores Stadium, Guatemala City
Referee: J.J Soto Paris
March 16, 1976

Saprissa (Costa Rica)	0 - 2	(El Salvador) Águila
Nil		Luis Ramírez Zapata 42'; Cisco Diaz 69'

Estadio Ricardo Saprissa
Referee: Mario Ramirez
March 17, 1976

Saprissa (Costa Rica)	5 - 1	(El Salvador) Platense
Roque Antonio Rojas; Carlos Sotano; Norberto Zafanella o.g.'		Luis Condomi

Estadio Ricardo Saprissa
March 17, 1976

Aurora (Guatemala)	5 - 2	(Guatemala) Comunicaciones
TBD; TBD		TBD; TBD

March 18, 1976

Alianza (El Salvador)	0 - 0	(Costa Rica) Cartaginés
Nil		Nil

Estadio Flor Blanca, San Salvador
March 21, 1976

Aurora (Guatemala)	2 - 2	(Costa Rica) Saprissa
Selvin Pennant; Omar Sanzogni		Gerardo Solano; Jorge Di Palma

Doroteo Guamuch Flores Stadium, Guatemala City
Referee: Wilfredo Leonel Torres
March 21, 1976

Cartaginés (Costa Rica)	1 - 2	(Guatemala) Comunicaciones
Wálter Elizondo		Oscar Sanchez; Raúl Cocherari

Estadio Fello Meza, Costa Rica
March 21, 1976

Alianza (El Salvador)	2 - 2	(El Salvador) Águila
Hugo Ottensen 17' 23'		Sergio Méndez 36'; Félix Pineda 75'

Estadio Cuscatlan, San Salvador
March 24, 1976

Platense (El Salvador)	0 - 0	(Costa Rica) Cartaginés
Nil		Nil

Estadio Flor Blanca, San Salvador

March 27, 1976

Alianza (El Salvador)	0 - 0	(Guatemala) Aurora
Nil		Nil

Estadio Flor Blanca, San Salvador
March 27, 1976

Cartaginés (Costa Rica)	0 - 0	(El Salvador) Águila
Nil		Nil

Estadio Fello Meza, Costa Rica
March 27, 1976

Comunicaciones (Guatemala)	0 - 0	(Costa Rica) Saprissa
Nil		Nil

Doroteo Guamuch Flores Stadium, Guatemala City

Aurora (Guatemala)	0 - 0	(El Salvador) Águila
Nil		Nil

Alianza (El Salvador)	0 - 2	(Guatemala) Comunicaciones
Nil		TBD; TBD

Cartaginés (Costa Rica)	0 - 0	(Costa Rica) Saprissa
Nil		Nil

Platense (El Salvador)	0 - 1	(El Salvador) Águila
Nil		TBD

Alianza (El Salvador)	4 - 0	(El Salvador) Platense
TBD; TBD		Nil

Comunicaciones (Guatemala)	0 - 0	(Costa Rica) Cartaginés
Nil		Nil

Saprissa (Costa Rica)	2- 0	(Guatemala) Aurora
TBD; TBD		Nil

Águila (El Salvador)	2 - 1	(El Salvador) Alianza
TBD; TBD		TBD

Cartaginés (Costa Rica)	2 - 2	(El Salvador) Platense
TBD; TBD		TBD; TBD

Águila (El Salvador)	3 - 0	(Costa Rica) Saprissa
TBD; TBD		Nil

Platense (El Salvador)	1 - 2	(Costa Rica) Saprissa
TBD		TBD; TBD

Comunicaciones (Guatemala)	0 - 0	(Guatemala) Aurora
Nil		Nil

Cartaginés (Costa Rica)	3 - 0	(El Salvador) Alianza
TBD; TBD		Nil

Aurora (Guatemala)	2 - 1	(Costa Rica) Cartaginés
TBD; TBD		TBD

Platense (El Salvador)	0 - 2	(Guatemala) Comunicaciones
Nil		TBD; TBD

Saprissa (Costa Rica)	3 - 1	(El Salvador) Alianza
TBD; TBD		TBD

Aurora (Guatemala)	3 - 0	(El Salvador) Platense
TBD; TBD		Nil

Águila (El Salvador)	0 - 2	(Guatemala) Comunicaciones
Nil		TBD; TBD

=== Standings ===
Pos	Team	Pld	W	D	L	GF	GA	GD	Pts
1	(Guatemala) Aurora	12	6	5	1	22	10	+12	17
2	(Guatemala) Comunicaciones	12	6	4	2	18	9	+9	16
3	(Costa Rica) Saprissa	12	5	4	3	17	13	+4	14
4	(El Salvador) Águila	12	4	4	4	15	16	−1	12
5	(Costa Rica) Cartaginés	12	1	8	3	9	11	−2	10
6	(El Salvador) Alianza	12	2	4	6	13	21	−8	8
7	(El Salvador) Platense	12	2	3	7	11	25	−14	7

Source: rsssf.com

== Champion ==
1976 Copa Fraternidad champion

1st title

== Top Scorer ==
No.	Player	Club	Goals
1	(Chile) Hugo Ottensen	Alianza	8
2	(Guatemala) Selvin Pennant	Aurora	7
3	(Guatemala) Rene Morales	Aurora	7
