= 1975 Copa Fraternidad =

Tournament details
- Teams: 6 (from 3 associations)

Final positions
- Champions: (El Salvador) Platense (1st title)
- Runners-up: (Guatemala) Aurora

Tournament statistics
- Matches played: 30
- Goals scored: 81 (2.7 per match)

The Copa Fraternidad 1975 was the fifth Central American club championship played between 6 clubs.

== Teams ==
Association	Team	Qualifying method	App.	Previous best	Coach	Captain
(Costa Rica) Costa Rica	Saprissa	1973–74 Champions	5th	Champions (1972, 1973)	(Costa Rica) Marvin Rodríguez	TBD
(Costa Rica) Costa Rica	Herediano	1973–74 Runners-up	3rd	3rd (1971)	(Uruguay) Orlando de Leon	TBD
(El Salvador) El Salvador	Platense	1974–75 Champions	1st	—	(Argentina) Juan Quarterone	TBD
(El Salvador) El Salvador	Negocios Internacionales	1974–75 Runners-up	3rd	5th (1973)	(Argentina) Gregorio Bundio	TBD
Guatemala	Municipal	1974 Champions	4th	Champions (1974)	(Uruguay) Rubén Amorín	TBD
Guatemala	Aurora	1974 Runners-up	3rd	Runners-up (1972)	(Guatemala) Jorge Roldan	TBD

== Results ==
Municipal (Guatemala)	0 - 0	(El Salvador) Platense
Nil		Nil

Estadio Doroteo Guamuch Flores, Guatemala City

Saprissa (Costa Rica)	1 - 2	(Guatemala) Aurora
TBD		TBD; TBD

Estadio Ricardo Saprissa Aymá, San Juan

NEIN (El Salvador)	1 - 1	(Costa Rica) Herediano
TBD		TBD

Estadio Flor Blanco, San Salvador

Aurora (Guatemala)	2 - 1	(El Salvador) NEIN
TBD; TBD		TBD

Estadio Doroteo Guamuch Flores, Guatemala City

Herediano (Costa Rica)	2 - 1	(Guatemala) Municipal
TBD; TBD		TBD

Estadio Eladio Rosabal Cordero, Heredia
20 January, 1975

Platense (El Salvador)	1 - 1	(Costa Rica) Saprissa
Norberto Zafanella		TBD

Estadio Flor Blanco, San Salvador
26 January, 1975

Aurora (Guatemala)	3 - 1	(Guatemala) Municipal
Omar Sanzogni; Luis López Meneses; Selvin Pennant		Felipe Carías

Estadio Doroteo Guamuch Flores, Guatemala City
30 January, 1975

NEIN (El Salvador)	1 - 0	(Guatemala) Municipal
Roberto Fernandez 69'		Nil

Estadio Flor Blanco, San Salvador
26 January, 1975

Platense (El Salvador)	1 - 0	(Costa Rica) Herediano
Luis Cesar Condomi		Nil

Estadio Flor Blanco, San Salvador
30 January, 1975

Saprissa (Costa Rica)	4 - 1	(Costa Rica) Herediano
TBD; TBD; TBD; TBD		TBD

Estadio Ricardo Saprissa Aymá, San Juan
26 January, 1975

Saprissa (Costa Rica)	2 - 1	(El Salvador) NEIN
Asdrúbal Paniagua; Odir Jacques		Hugo Ottensen

Estadio Ricardo Saprissa Aymá, San Juan
6 February, 1975

Aurora (Guatemala)	1 - 2	(El Salvador) Platense
Rene Morales		Helio Rodriguez; Rafael Bucaro

Referee: Soto Paiz

Municipal (Guatemala)	1 - 1	(Costa Rica) Saprissa
TBD		TBD

Estadio Doroteo Guamuch Flores, Guatemala City

Herediano (Costa Rica)	1 - 2	(Guatemala) Aurora
TBD		TBD; TBD

Estadio Eladio Rosabal Cordero, Heredia
February 9, 1975

Platense (El Salvador)	1 - 0	(El Salvador) NEIN
Luis Cesar Condomi		Nil

Estadio Flor Blanco, San Salvador

February 13, 1975

Aurora (Guatemala)	5 - 3	(Costa Rica) Saprissa
Selvin Pennant; René Morales		Yuba Paniagua; Carlos Solano; Odir Jacques

Estadio Doroteo Guamuch Flores, Guatemala City
February 13, 1975

Platense (El Salvador)	3 - 0	(Guatemala) Municipal
Helio Rodriguez; Carlos Monterroso o.g.' Oscar Armando Payas		Nil

Estadio Flor Blanco, San Salvador
13 February 1975

Herediano (Costa Rica)	1 - 0	(El Salvador) NEIN
Johnny Alvarado		Nil

Estadio Eladio Rosabal Cordero, Heredia
Referee: Luis Hernández Gudiel

Municipal (Guatemala)	0 - 1	(Costa Rica) Herediano
Nil		TBD

Estadio Doroteo Guamuch Flores, Guatemala City
February 19, 1975

NEIN (El Salvador)	1 - 1	(Guatemala) Aurora
TBD		TBD

Estadio Flor Blanco, San Salvador
February 19, 1975

Saprissa (Costa Rica)	1 - 0	(El Salvador) Platense
TBD		Nil

Estadio Ricardo Saprissa Aymá, San Juan
February 23,1975

Herediano (Costa Rica)	1 - 1	(El Salvador) Platense
Ernesto Vincent Wauchope		Norberto Zafanella

Estadio Eladio Rosabal Cordero, Heredia
February 23, 1975

NEIN (El Salvador)	1 - 1	(Costa Rica) Saprissa
Enos Pereira		Odir Jacques

Estadio Flor Blanco, San Salvador
February 26, 1975

Platense (El Salvador)	3 - 2	(El Salvador) NEIN
Helio Rodriguez; Norberto Zafanella		Rey Cabrera; Enos Pereira

Estadio Flor Blanco, San Salvador
February 26, 1975

Herediano (Costa Rica)	2 - 0	(Costa Rica) Saprissa
TBD; TBD		Nil

Estadio Eladio Rosabal Cordero, Heredia
February 26, 1975

Municipal (Guatemala)	2 - 2	(Guatemala) Aurora
TBD; TBD		TBD; TBD

Estadio Doroteo Guamuch Flores, Guatemala City

Municipal (Guatemala)	3 - 1	(El Salvador) NEIN
Julio César Anderson; Borrago		Rey Cabrera 43'

Estadio Doroteo Guamuch Flores, Guatemala City

Platense (El Salvador)	1 - 1	(Guatemala) Aurora
Jose Luis Rugamas		Saturnino Osorio O.G.'

Estadio Flor Blanco, San Salvador
Attendance: 30,000
9 March, 1975

Aurora (Guatemala)	3 - 5	(Costa Rica) Herediano
Rene Morales 36' 75'; Luis Bolivar Quiros own 97'		Vicente Wanchope 28'; Rafael Angel Oviedo 32' pen 75'; Jorge Washington Santos 37' 44'

Estadio Doroteo Guamuch Flores, Guatemala City, Guatemala
Referee: Tomas Herrera

Saprissa (Costa Rica)	0 - 0	(Guatemala) Municipal
Nil		Nil

Estadio Ricardo Saprissa Aymá, San Juan

=== Standings ===
Pos	Team	Pld	W	D	L	GF	GA	GD	Pts
1	(El Salvador) Platense	10	5	4	1	13	7	+6	14
2	(Guatemala) Aurora	10	5	3	2	22	18	+4	13
3	(Costa Rica) Herediano	10	5	2	3	15	13	+2	12
4	(Costa Rica) Saprissa	10	3	4	3	14	14	0	10
5	(Guatemala) Municipal	10	1	4	5	8	14	−6	6
6	(El Salvador) NEIN	10	1	3	6	9	15	−6	5

== Champion ==
1975 Copa Fraternidad champion

Platense
1st title
