= List of Platense Zacatecoluca records and statistics =

Club Deportivo Platense Municipal Zacatecoluca is a Salvadoran professional association football club based in Zacatecoluca, la Paz. The club was formed on 1 May 1951. Platense currently plays in the Primera División.

This list encompasses the major honours won by Platense and records set by the club, their managers and their players. The player records section includes details of the club's leading goalscorers and those who have made most appearances in first-team competitions. It also records notable achievements by Platense players on the international stage, and the highest transfer fees paid and received by the club.

Platense has set various records since its founding.

== Team statistics ==
=== Primera Division ===
- Most seasons played in Primera Division: 6 years (from 1975 season to 1980)
- Most consecutive games undefeated: 31 games, 13 wins and 18 draws, (1990/91 seasons)
- Most consecutive wins: 17 (in TBD season)
- Most consecutive lost: 17 (in TBD season)

=== Matches ===
==== Firsts ====
- First league match: TBD 3–2 Platense, Prima Categoria, 10 January 1909.
- First Copa Presidente match: Platense 1-2 Atletico Marte, 1999–2000 Copa Presidente, 20 January 2000.
- First CONCACAF match: Platense 4-3 Aurora, 1975 CONCACAF Champions' Cup, 6 July 1975.
- First UNCAF match: Platense 0-0 CSD Municipal , 1975 Copa Fraternidad, January 1975.

==== Wins ====
- Record win: 16–0 against TBD, Prima Categoria, 10 January 1915.
- Record Primera division win: 11–0 against Cojutepeque F.C., 30 April 1995. []
- Record Copa El Salvador win: 5–1 against Chalatenango, September 15, 2025.
- Record win in CONCACAF competitions: 4-3 against Aurora, 1975 CONCACAF Champions' Cup, 6 July 1975.
- Record win in UNCAF Competitions: 3-0 against Municipal, 1975 Copa Fraternidad, February 13, 1975
- Most wins in a Primera division season: 30 (out of 38 games), during the 2006–07 season.

==== Defeats ====
- Record Primera division defeat: 1–9 against TBD, 10 June 1961.
- Record Copa El Salvador defeat:
  - 0–4 against Atletico Marte, February 9, 1999.
- Record defeat in CONCACAF competitions:
  - 0-1 against Aurora, 1975 CONCACAF Champions' Cup, 9 July 1975.
- Record defeat in UNCAF competitions:
  - 5-1 against Saprissa, 1976 Copa Fraternidad, TBD, 1976.
- Most defeats in a Primera division season: 19 (out of 40 games), during the TBD season.
- Fewest defeats in a Primera division season: 1 (out of 38 games), during the TBD season.

=== Points ===
- Most points in a Primera division season:
  - League format: TBD in 38 games, during the TBD season
  - Apertura/Clausura formats: TBD in 38 games, during the TBD season.
- Fewest points in a Primera season:
  - League format: TBD in 30 games, during the TBD season.
  - Apertura/Clausura formats: TBD in 38 games, during the TBD season.
- Most points in a Segunda division season:
  - League format: TBD in 38 games, during the TBD season
  - Apertura/Clausura formats: 9 points in 20 games, during the 2024 Apertura season.
- Fewest points in a Segunda season:
  - League format: 2 points in 27 games, during the 1998-1999: season.
  - Apertura/Clausura formats: TBD in 38 games, during the TBD season.

=== Overall seasons table in Primera División de Fútbol Profesional ===
As of 22 April 2026, after their 2-0 win over Isidro Metapan

Pos.	Club	Season In D1	Pl.	W	D	L	GS	GA	Dif.
TBA	C.D. Platense Municipal Zacatecoluca	12	421	145	112	186	534	653	−119

=== Performance in Domestic competitions ===
- TBD: 1 appearances

Best:
TBD : TBD

- Copa El Salvador: 3 appearances

Best: Quarter final (2005)
1999-2000 : Group Stage
2005 : Quarterfinals
2026 : Round of 16

=== Performance in CONCACAF/UNCAF competitions ===
- CONCACAF Champions Cup: 1 appearances

Best: First Round in 1975
1975 : First Round

- CONCACAF League: 1 appearances

Best: Preliminary Round in 2022
2022 CONCACAF League: Preliminary Round

- CONCACAF Central American Cup: 0 appearance

Best: Not yet competed
TBD: TBD

- Copa Fraternidad: 2 appearances

Best: Champion in 1975
1975 : Champion
1976 : 7th

== Players statistics ==
Most appearances (as of August 8, 2012)
#	Name	Career	Apps	Goals
1	(El Salvador) TBD	Tbd-TBD	000	000
2	(El Salvador) TBD	Tbd-TBD	000	000
3	(El Salvador) TBD	Tbd-TBD	000	000
4	(El Salvador) TBD	Tbd-TBD	000	000
5	(El Salvador) TBD	Tbd-TBD	000	000
6	(El Salvador) TBD	Tbd-TBD	000	000
7	(El Salvador) TBD	Tbd-TBD	000	000
8	(El Salvador) TBD	Tbd-TBD	000	000
9	(El Salvador) TBD	Tbd-TBD	000	000
10	(El Salvador) TBD	Tbd-TBD	000	000
11	(El Salvador) TBD	Tbd-TBD	000	000
12	(El Salvador) TBD	Tbd-TBD	000	000
13	(El Salvador) TBD	Tbd-TBD	000	000
14	(El Salvador) TBD	Tbd-TBD	000	000
15	(El Salvador) TBD	Tbd-TBD	000	000
16	(El Salvador) TBD	Tbd-TBD	000	000
17	(El Salvador) TBD	Tbd-TBD	000	000
18	(El Salvador) Wilmer Novoa	2021-Present	155	6
19	(El Salvador) Xavier García	2023-Present	130	8
20	(El Salvador) TBD	Tbd-TBD	000	000

Most goals
#	Player	Career	Apps	Goals
1	(El Salvador) TBD			
2	(El Salvador) TBD			
3	(El Salvador) TBD			
4	(El Salvador) TBD			
5	(El Salvador) TBD			
6	(El Salvador) TBD			
7	(El Salvador) TBD			
8	(El Salvador) TBD			
9	(El Salvador) TBD			
10	(El Salvador) TBD			
11	(El Salvador) TBD			
12	(El Salvador) TBD			
13	(El Salvador) TBD			
14	(El Salvador) TBD			
15	(El Salvador) TBD			
16	(Colombia) Juan Camilo Delgado	2018–2022		43
17	(El Salvador) Rafael Bucaro	1974–1975		31
18	(El Salvador) Oscar "Lotario" Guerrero	1970–1975/1974–75		26
19	(Colombia) Carlos Bogota	2026 -Present		20
20	(Colombia) Nayan Bello	2025 -Present		17

=== Platense's top flight top goalscorer ===
This is the list of Platense's top league goalscorers in a single season

	Name	Season	Goals
1	(El Salvador) Oscar Guerrero	1974-75	14
2	(El Salvador) Rafael Bucaro	1975-1976	17
3	(El Salvador) TBD	1977–78	00
4	(El Salvador) TBD	1978–79	00
5	(El Salvador) TBD	1979–80	00
6	(Colombia) Camilio Delgado	Apertura 2021	9
7	(El Salvador) Irvin Herrera	Clausura 2022	7
8	(El Salvador) (United States) Andrés Hernández	Apertura 2022	2
9	(El Salvador) Edgar Valladares	Clausura 2023	4
10	(El Salvador) Jose Posada	Apertura 2023	5
11	(El Salvador) Daniel Arevalo	Clausura 2024	6
12	(El Salvador) Edgar Valladares	Apertura 2024	3
13	(Colombia) Jonathan Urrutia	Clausura 2025	9 (Note: finished the season as the league top scorer)
14	(El Salvador) Emerson Sandoval	Apertura 2025	8
15	(Colombia) Carlos Bogotá	Clausura 2026	13
16	(El Salvador) TBD	Apertura 2026	00
17	(El Salvador) TBD	Clausura 2027	00

=== By competition ===
- Most goals scored in all competitions: TBD – (El Salvador) TBD, Year–Year
- Most goals scored in Primera Division: TBD – (El Salvador) TBD, Year–Year
- Most goals scored in Copa Presidente: TBD – (El Salvador) TBD, Year–Year
- Most goals scored in International competitions: 'TBD – (El Salvador) TBD, Year–Year
- Most goals scored in CONCACAF competitions: 1 – (Argentina) Luis Cesar Condomi
  (El Salvador) Oscar Guerrero
  (El Salvador) Oscar Armando Payes, 1975
- Most goals scored in UNCAF competitions: 3 – (Brazil) Helio Rodriguez
  (Argentina) Norberto Zafanella, 1975
- Most goals scored in CONCACAF Champions League: 1 – (Colombia) Jhon Machado
  (El Salvador) Jamie Ortiz, 2022
- Most goals scored in FIFA World Cup: 1 – (El Salvador) TBD, 1982

=== In a single season ===
- Most goals scored in a season in all competitions: TBD – (El Salvador) TBD, Year–Year
- Most goals scored in a single Primera Division season: TBD – (El Salvador) TBD, Year–Year
- Most goals scored in a single Apertura/Clausura season: TBD – (El Salvador) TBD, Year–Year
- Most goals scored in a single Copa Presidente season: TBD – (El Salvador) TBD, Year–Year
- Most goals scored in a single CONCACAF Champions League season: 1 – (Argentina) Luis Cesar Condomi
  (El Salvador) Oscar Guerrero
  (El Salvador) Oscar Armando Payes, 1975
- Most goals scored in a single UNCAF Cup season: 3 – (Brazil) Helio Rodriguez
  (Argentina) Norberto Zafanella, 1975

=== In a single match ===
- Most goals scored in a League match: TBD
  - (El Salvador) TBD v Olimpic, 24 December 1950
- Most goals scored in a Copa Presidente match: TBD
  - (El Salvador) TBD v TBD, Day Month Year
- Most goals scored in an Apertura/Clausura match: TBD
  - (El Salvador) TBD v TBD, Day Month Year
- Most goals scored in a CONCACAF Champions League match: 1
  - (Colombia) Jhon Machado
    (El Salvador) Jaime Ortiz v Verdes FC, 2022
- Most goals scored in a UNCAF Cup match: 2
  - (Brazil) Helio Rodríguez v NEIN, 1975

=== Others ===
- Youngest goalscorer: 17 years, 114 days – (El Salvador) TBD v TBD, Year Primera Division, Day Month Year
- Oldest goalscorer: – 38 years, 233 days (El Salvador) TBD v TBD, Year Primera Division, Day Month Year
- Most goals scored in CONCACAF Finals: TBD
  - (El Salvador) (El Salvador) TBD, four in TBD.
- Fastest goal:
  - 27 seconds – (El Salvador) Edgar Valladares v Aguila, Primera Division, 26 January 2025
- Fastest hat-trick: 8 minutes – (El Salvador) TBD v TBD, Year Primera Division, Day Month Year
- Most hat-tricks in Primera Division: TBD – (El Salvador) TBD, Year-Year
- Most hat-tricks in a single season: TBD – (El Salvador) TBD,2011–12 (7 times in league).

=== Historical goals ===
Goal	Name	Date	Match
1st in Primera Division	(El Salvador) Óscar Gustavo Guerrero	17 March 1974	Platense 2 – Alianza 1
100th	(El Salvador) Óscar Gustavo Guerrero? Rafael Bucaro or Rodolfo Vicente	2 November 1975	Platense 5 – Municipal Limeno 2
200th	(El Salvador) TBD	Day Month Year	TBD 3 – TBD 1
300th	(El Salvador) TBD	Day Month Year	TBD 1 – TBD 3
400th	(El Salvador) TBD	Day Month Year	TBD 0 – TBD 5
500th	(El Salvador) Kevin Calderón.	12 October 2025	Platense 2 – Inter FA 2
1000th	(El Salvador) TBD	Day Month Year	TBD 4 – TBD 3
1500th	(El Salvador) TBD	Day Month Year	TBD 4 – TBD 3

== Other records ==
- The highest transfer fee received by the club for a player was $100,000, paid by TBD for TBD in 1991.
- The highest transfer fee paid by the club for a player was TBD, paid to TBD for TBD on TBD.
- TBD was the inaugural Platense player to be called to the El Salvador national football team
- Platense one of four side to win three consecutive titles and promotions 1973–1975
- Most titles won by player with Platense: Oscar Gustavo Guerrero (4 titles) []
- Youngest player: Luis Guevara Mora (14 years and 2 months) v TBD 28 July 1975.

=== Internationals ===
- First international for El Salvador: TBD v Guatemala (Day Month Year)
- Most international caps: Xavier Garcia – 62 Caps, El Salvador
- Most Salvadoran caps as an Platense player: TBD – TBD, El Salvador
- Most international caps as an Platense player: Krisean Lopez – 2 Caps, Belize
- Most international goals (total): 13 – Rafael Burgos, El Salvador
- Most international goals as an Platense player: TBD – TBD, El Salvador

== Notable players ==
=== World Cup players ===
The following World Cup players, played at Platense at some point during their career. Highlighted players played for Platense while playing at the World Cup.

- (El Salvador) Salvador Mariona (Mexico 1970)
- (El Salvador) Gualberto Fernández (Mexico 1970)
- (El Salvador) Luis Guevara Mora (Spain 1982)
- (El Salvador) José Luis Rugamas (Spain 1982)
- (El Salvador) Mauricio Alfaro (Spain 1982)

=== Olympic Games players ===
The following Summer Olympics players, played at Platense at some point during their career. Highlighted players played for Platense while playing at the Summer Olympics.

- (Guatemala) Armando Melgar Nelson (Mexico 1968)
- (El Salvador) Salvador Flamenco (Mexico 1968)
- (El Salvador) Gualberto Fernández (Mexico 1968)

=== CONCACAF Gold Cup players ===
The following CONCACAF Gold Cup players, played at Platense at some point during their career. Highlighted players played for Platense while playing at the CONCACAF Gold Cup.

- (El Salvador) Luis Anaya (2007; 2011)
- (El Salvador) Gilberto Baires (2011)
- (El Salvador) Rafael Burgos (2013; 2015)
- (El Salvador) Cristian Gil (2023)

=== National team Players ===
The following National football team players, played at Platense at some point during their career. Highlighted players played for Platense while the represented their respective nation

- (Belize) Krisean Lopez (2 games)
- (Costa Rica) Fernando Montero
- (Costa Rica) Jorge Peralta
- (El Salvador) Mauricio Alfaro
- (El Salvador) Elvin Alvarado
- (El Salvador) Luis Anaya
- (El Salvador) Gilberto Baires
- (El Salvador) Juan Barahona
- (El Salvador) Jorge Búcaro
- (El Salvador) Rafael Bucaro
- (El Salvador) Rafael Burgos
- (El Salvador) Salvador Cabezas
- (El Salvador) Manuel Cañadas
- (El Salvador) Marlón Cornejo
- (El Salvador) (Uruguay) Albert Fay
- (El Salvador) Gualberto Fernández
- (El Salvador) Salvador Flamenco
- (El Salvador) Xavier Garcia
- (El Salvador) Cristian Gil
- (El Salvador) Manuel Gonzalez
- (El Salvador) Oscar Gustavo Guerrero
- (El Salvador) Andrés Hernández
- (El Salvador) Irvin Herrera
- (El Salvador) Salvador Mariona
- (El Salvador) Mauricio Esteban Mendez
- (El Salvador) Luis Guevara Mora
- (El Salvador) José Ángel Peña
- (El Salvador) José Luis Rugamas
- (El Salvador) Allexon Saravia
- (Guatemala) Armando Melgar Nelson
- (Nicaragua) (Panama) Raúl Leguías
- (Nicaragua) (Spain) Pablo Gállego
- (Panama) Jair Catuy
- (Togo) (Brazil) Fábio Pereira de Azevedo
