= 1973 Copa Fraternidad =

Tournament details
- Teams: 6 (from 3 associations)

Final positions
- Champions: (Costa Rica) Saprissa (2nd title)
- Runners-up: (El Salvador) Águila

Tournament statistics
- Matches played: 30
- Goals scored: 82 (2.73 per match)
- Top scorer: Odir Jacques (8 goals)

The Copa Fraternidad 1973 was the third Central American club championship played between 6 clubs.

== Teams ==
Association	Team	Qualifying method	App.	Previous best
(Costa Rica) Costa Rica	Saprissa	1972 Champions	3rd	Champions (1972)
(Costa Rica) Costa Rica	Alajuelense	1972 Runners-up	2nd	Group stage (1972)
(El Salvador) El Salvador	Águila	1972 Champions	1st	—
(El Salvador) El Salvador	Juventud Olímpica	1972 Runners-up	2nd	Group stage (1972)
Guatemala	Comunicaciones	1972 Champions	3rd	Champions (1971)
Guatemala	Municipal	1972 Runners-up	2nd	Group stage (1972)

== Results ==
7 January 1973

Juventud Olímpica (El Salvador)	0 - 2	(Guatemala) Municipal
Nil		TBD; TBD

7 January 1973

Comunicaciones (Guatemala)	1 - 0	(Costa Rica) Alajuelense
TBD		Nil

7 January 1973

Saprissa (Costa Rica)	1 - 2	(El Salvador) Aguila
Odir Jacques 10'		Luis Ramírez Zapata 34' 73'

Estadio Ricardo Saprissa
Referee: Giovanni Canessa
14 January 1973

Aguila (El Salvador)	1 - 1	(Guatemala) Comunicaciones
TBD		TBD

14 January 1973

Municipal (Guatemala)	1 - 1	(Costa Rica) Saprissa
Rafael Bucaro 50'		Édgar Marín 33'

14 January 1973

Alajuelense (Costa Rica)	2 - 1	(El Salvador) Juventud Olímpica
TBD; TBD		TBD

21 January 1973

Municipal (Guatemala)	1 - 0	(Guatemala) Comunicaciones
TBD		Nil

21 January 1973

Juventud Olímpica (El Salvador)	1 - 3	(Costa Rica) Saprissa
Moises Gonzalez 44'		Odir Jacques 28'; Hernan Morales 40'; Edgar Marin 83'

Referee: Danilo Ardon
21 January 1973

Alajuelense (Costa Rica)	0 - 0	(El Salvador) Aguila
Nil		Nil

Referee: Marco Antyonio Gracias Regaldo
28 January 1973

Comunicaciones (Guatemala)	0 - 1	(El Salvador) Juventud Olímpica
Nil		Moises Gonzalez (pen.)

28 January 1973

Aguila (El Salvador)	1 - 0	(Guatemala) Municipal
TBD		Nil

31 January 1973

Alajuelense (Costa Rica)	1 - 0	(Costa Rica) Saprissa
Óscar Emilio Cordero 26'		Nil

4 February 1973

Municipal (Guatemala)	1 - 2	(Costa Rica) Alajuelense
TBD		TBD; TBD

4 February 1973

Saprissa (Costa Rica)	3 - 2	(Guatemala) Comunicaciones
Hernán Morales 26'; Édgar Marín (pen.), 36'; Jaime Jimmy Grant 72'		Selvin Pennant 40'; Carlos Granda 86'

4 February 1973

Juventud Olímpica (El Salvador)	3 - 1	(El Salvador) Aguila
TBD; TBD; TBD		TBD

11 February 1973

Alajuelense (Costa Rica)	1 - 0	(Guatemala) Comunicaciones
TBD		Nil

11 February 1973

Aguila (El Salvador)	2 - 0	(Costa Rica) Saprissa
Ismael Cisco Díaz 31'; Fernando Solano 85' (o.g.)		Nil

11 February 1973

Municipal (Guatemala)	1 - 2	(El Salvador) Juventud Olímpica
TBD		TBD; Helio Rodriguez

18 February 1973

Comunicaciones (Guatemala)	2 - 0	(El Salvador) Aguila
TBD; TBD		Nil

18 February 1973

Saprissa (Costa Rica)	1 - 0	(Guatemala) Municipal
Gerardo Solano		Nil

18 February 1973

Juventud Olímpica (El Salvador)	1 - 0	(Costa Rica) Alajuelense
Helio Rodriguez		Nil

25 February 1973

Comunicaciones (Guatemala)	3 - 1	(Guatemala) Municipal
TBD; TBD; TBD		TBD

25 February 1973

Aguila (El Salvador)	1 - 1	(Costa Rica) Alajuelense
TBD		TBD

25 February 1973

Saprissa (Costa Rica)	5 - 2	(El Salvador) Juventud Olímpica
Asdrúbal Paniagua 2'; Hernán Morales 14'; Jaime Jimmy Grant 33'; Gerardo Solano 68' 78'		Moises Gonzalez (pen.), 19'; Helio Rodrigues 56'

28 February 1973

Municipal (Guatemala)	0 - 2	(El Salvador) Aguila
Nil		Joaquin Rene Cazalban; Ismael Díaz

Estadio Mateo Flores
28 February 1973

Juventud Olímpica (El Salvador)	1 - 2	(Guatemala) Comunicaciones
Moisés Gonzalez		TBD; TBD

Referee: Luis Paulinho Silves
28 February 1973

Saprissa (Costa Rica)	5 - 1	(Costa Rica) Alajuelense
Odir Jacques 15' 42' 77'; Gerardo Solano 70'; Adonay Salas 88'		Pedro Caetano Da Silva 52'

4 March 1973

Alajuelense (Costa Rica)	1 - 0	(Guatemala) Municipal
TBD		Nil

4 March 1973

Comunicaciones (Guatemala)	2 - 3	(Costa Rica) Saprissa
Selvin Pennant 1'; Peter Sandoval (pen.), 83'		Odir Jaqués 10'; Hernán Morales 20'; Jaime Grant 72'

4 March 1973

Aguila (El Salvador)	2 - 1	(El Salvador) Juventud Olímpica
Rene Toledo (o.g.); Luis Rivas		Helio Rodríguez

Referee: Efren Aguilar

=== Standings ===
Pos	Team	Pld	W	D	L	GF	GA	GD	Pts
1	(Costa Rica) Saprissa	10	6	1	3	22	14	+8	13
2	(El Salvador) Aguila	10	5	3	2	12	8	+4	13
3	(Costa Rica) Alajuelense	10	5	2	3	9	10	−1	12
4	(Guatemala) Comunicaciones	10	4	1	5	13	12	+1	9
5	(El Salvador) Juventud Olímpica	10	4	0	6	12	18	−6	8
6	(Guatemala) Municipal	10	2	1	7	7	13	−6	5

Source: https://www.rsssf.org/tablesf/fraternidad.html RSSSF - Copa Fraternidad

== Championship playoff ==
11 March 1973 1st leg	Águila (El Salvador)	2–0	(Costa Rica) Saprissa	San Salvador, El Salvador
	Pinho 49' 88'	Report		Stadium: Estadio Flor Blanca; Attendance: 20,000; Referee: Mario Rubio (MEX)

14 March 1973 2nd leg	Saprissa (Costa Rica)	3–1	(El Salvador) Águila	San José, Costa Rica
	Hernández 47' 61'; Jacques 54' (pen.)	Report	67' Díaz	Stadium: Estadio Ricardo Saprissa Aymá; Attendance: 11,215; Referee: Javier Galindo (MEX)

16 March 1973 Playoff	Saprissa (Costa Rica)	2–1	(El Salvador) Águila	San José, Costa Rica
	Jacques 33'; Solano 84'	Report	38' Pineda	Stadium: Estadio Nacional; Attendance: 17,655; Referee: Jorge Narváez (MEX)

== Top Scorer ==
No.	Player	Club	Goals
1	(Brazil) Odir Jacques	Saprissa	8
2	(El Salvador) Luis Ramirez Zapata	Aguila	5
3	(El Salvador) Moisés González	Juventud Olímpica	5
4	(Guatemala) Selvin Pennant	Comunicaciones	5
5	(Costa Rica) Gerardo Solano	Saprissa	5
6	(Costa Rica) Hernán Morales	Saprissa	4
7	(Brazil) Helio Rodrigues dos Santos	Juventud Olímpica	4
8	(Costa Rica) Jaime Jimmy Grant	Saprissa	4
9	(Costa Rica) Fernando Correcaminos Rodríguez	LD Alajuelense	3
10	(Brazil) Julio César Anderson	Municipal	3
11	(Costa Rica) Édgar Marín	Saprissa	3
12	(Guatemala) Carlos Granda	Comunicaciones	3
13	(El Salvador) Ismael Cisco Díaz	Aguila	3

== Champion ==
1973 Copa Fraternidad champion

2nd title
