= 1976 CONCACAF Champions' Cup =

12th edition of premier club football tournament organized by CONCACAF

Copa de Campeones Concacaf

Tournament details
- Dates: 6 June 1976 – 13 February 1977
- Teams: 18 (from 11 associations)

Final positions
- Champions: (El Salvador) Águila
- Runners-up: (Suriname) Robinhood

The 1976 CONCACAF Champions' Cup was the 12th edition of the annual international club football competition held in the CONCACAF region (North America, Central America and the Caribbean), the CONCACAF Champions' Cup. It determined that year's club champion of association football in the CONCACAF region and was played from 6 June 1976 till 13 February 1977.

The teams were split in three zones (North American, Central American and Caribbean), each one qualifying the winner to the final tournament, where the winners of the North and Central zones played a semi-final to decide who was going to play against the Caribbean champion in the final. All the matches in the tournament were played under the home/away match system.

Salvadorean club Águila beat Surinamese Robinhood in the final to became CONCACAF champion for the first time in their history, and the second Salvadoran team to win the trophy.

== North American Zone ==
=== First round ===
Team 1	Agg.	Team 2	1st leg	2nd leg
Toronto Italia (Canada)	5–3	(United States) New York Inter-Giuliana	3–2	2–1

- León on a bye.
- Toluca on a bye.
- Serbian White Eagles on a bye.

Toronto Italia (Canada)	3–2	(United States) New York Inter-Giuliana

New York Inter-Giuliana (United States)	1–2 (3–5 agg.)	(Canada) Toronto Italia

- Toronto Italia advances to the second round.

=== Second round ===
Team 1	Agg.	Team 2	1st leg	2nd leg
León (Mexico)	w/o	(Canada) Serbian White Eagles		
Toronto Italia (Canada)	w/o	(Mexico) Toluca		

- Serbian White Eagles withdrew.
- The Toronto Italia v Toluca matches were originally scheduled for July 16 and August 31, but Toluca asked to reschedule the series to September 5 and 8. After the matches were not played by September 8, CONCACAF disqualified Toluca.

- León and Toronto Italia advanced to the third round.

=== Third round ===
Team 1	Agg.	Team 2	1st leg	2nd leg
León (Mexico)	w/o	(Canada) Toronto Italia		

- Toronto Italia withdrew.
- León advances to the CONCACAF Final.

== Central American Zone ==
=== First round ===
Torneo Centroamericano de Concacaf 1976

Group A

Pos	Team	Pld	W	D	L	GF	GA	GD	Pts	Qualification
1	Águila	2	2	0	0	3	1	+2	4	Advances to third round
2	Aurora	2	0	1	1	2	3	−1	1	
3	Alianza	2	0	1	1	1	2	−1	1	

Team 1	Score	Team 2
Águila (El Salvador)	2–1	(Guatemala) Aurora
Alianza (El Salvador)	1–1	(Guatemala) Aurora
Águila (El Salvador)	1–0	(El Salvador) Alianza

- Águila advances to the third round.

20 June 1976	Águila	2–1	Aurora	San Salvador, El Salvador
	Félix "Garrobita" Pineda; Luis Baltazar Ramírez "Pelé" Zapata		René Morales	Stadium: Estadio Flor Blanca

27 June 1976	Alianza	1–1	Aurora	San Salvador, El Salvador
	Óscar Gustavo "Lotario" Guerrero		René Morales	Stadium: Estadio Flor Blanca

5 July 1976	Águila	1–0	Alianza	San Salvador, El Salvador
	Ismael "Cisco" Díaz			Stadium: Estadio Flor Blanca

Group B

5 September 1976	Olimpia	0–0	Real España	Tegucigalpa, Honduras
				Stadium: Estadio Tiburcio Carías Andino

15 September 1976	Real España	1–0 (1–0 agg.)	Olimpia	San Pedro Sula, Honduras
	Ferreira			Stadium: Estadio General Francisco Morazán
Note: C.D. Olimpia advances to the second round.

=== Round 2 ===
Team 1	Agg.	Team 2	1st leg	2nd leg
Diriangén (Nicaragua)	w/o	(Honduras) Real España	{{{6}}}	{{{7}}}

- Águila on a Bye to the third round
- Real España withdrew
- Diriangén advances to the third round.

=== Round 3 ===
Team 1	Agg.	Team 2	1st leg	2nd leg
Diriangén (Nicaragua)	2–11	(El Salvador) Águila	1–6	1–5

- Águila advances to the CONCACAF Final.
3 November 1976

Diriangén (Nicaragua)	1–6 (a.e.t.)	(El Salvador) Águila
TBD		Luis Ramírez Zapata; Félix Pineda; Moises Gonzalez

Estadio Colegio La Salle, Diriamba

21 November 1976

Águila (El Salvador)	5–1	(Nicaragua) Diriangén
Ismael Díaz; Félix Pineda; Sergio Méndez; Luis Ramírez Zapata		TBD

Estadio Juan Francisco Barraza, San Miguel

== Caribbean Zone ==
=== First round ===
Team 1	Agg.	Team 2	1st leg	2nd leg
Robinhood (Suriname)	4–2	(Netherlands Antilles) Jong Colombia	3–1	1–1
Christianburg (Guyana)	1–20	(Suriname) Voorwaarts	1–8	0–12
Thomas United (Guyana)	1–6	(Trinidad and Tobago) Tesoro Palo Seco	0–2	1–4

- Malvern United on a Bye

Robinhood (Suriname)	3–1	(Netherlands Antilles) Jong Colombia

Jong Colombia (Netherlands Antilles)	1–1 (2–4 agg.)	(Suriname) Robinhood

Christianburg (Guyana)	1–8	(Suriname) Voorwaarts

Voorwaarts (Suriname)	12–0 (20–1 agg.)	(Guyana) Christianburg

Thomas United (Guyana)	0–2	(Trinidad and Tobago) Tesoro Palo Seco

Tesoro Palo Seco (Trinidad and Tobago)	4–1 (6–1 agg.)	(Guyana) Thomas United

- Robinhood, Voorwaarts and Tesoro Palo Seco advance to the second round.

=== Second round ===
Team 1	Agg.	Team 2	1st leg	2nd leg
Robinhood (Suriname)	2–0	(Trinidad and Tobago) Malvern United	0–0	2–0
Tesoro Palo Seco (Trinidad and Tobago)	1–6	(Suriname) Voorwaarts	0–4	1–2

- Robinhood and Voorwaarts advance to the third round

Robinhood (Suriname)	0–0	(Trinidad and Tobago) Malvern United

Malvern United (Trinidad and Tobago)	0–2 (0–2 agg.)	(Suriname) Robinhood

Tesoro Palo Seco (Trinidad and Tobago)	0–4	(Suriname) Voorwaarts

Voorwaarts (Suriname)	2–1 (6–1 agg.)	(Trinidad and Tobago) Tesoro Palo Seco

=== Third round ===
Team 1	Agg.	Team 2	1st leg	2nd leg
Robinhood (Suriname)	3–0	(Suriname) Voorwaarts	3–0	0–0

- Robinhood advances to the CONCACAF Final.

Robinhood (Suriname)	3–0	(Suriname) Voorwaarts
TBD; TBD; TBD		Nil

Voorwaarts (Suriname)	0–0 (0–3 agg.)	(Suriname) Robinhood
Nil		Nil

== Semi-final ==
Team 1	Agg.	Team 2	1st leg	2nd leg
Águila (El Salvador)	3–1	(Mexico) León	1–1	2–0*

- Due to several players being sent off after a brawl, León forfeited the 2nd leg while leading 2–1: Águila was awarded a 2–0 win.
24 January 1977

Águila (El Salvador)	1–1 (a.e.t.)	(Mexico) León
Félix Pineda		Walter Mantegazza

Estadio Cuscatlán
San Salvador – El Salvador

31 January 1977

León (Mexico)	2–1	(El Salvador) Águila
Goal		Goal

Estadio Cuscatlán
San Salvador – El Salvador

== Final ==
=== First leg ===
1976 CONCACAF Champions' Cup Final
13 February 1977
(UTC−06:00)
First leg

Águila (El Salvador)	5–1	(Suriname) Robinhood
Zepeda 20'; Vargas 26' 89'; Pineda 40', 79' (pen.)	Report	68' Emanuelson

Estadio Cuscatlán, San Salvador

=== Second leg ===
15 February 1977
(UTC−06:00)
Second leg

Robinhood (Suriname)	2–3 (a.e.t.)	(El Salvador) Águila
Nathoe 56'; Olmberg 95'	Report	93' Zepeda; 112' Díaz; 117' Ramírez

Estadio Cuscatlán, San Salvador

Aguila won the series 4–2 on points (8–3 on aggregate).

== Champion ==
CONCACAF Champions' Cup
1976 Champion
(El Salvador)
Águila
First title
