= 1975 CONCACAF Champions' Cup =

11th edition of premier club football tournament organized by CONCACAF

Copa de Campeones Concacaf

Tournament details
- Dates: 5 July 1975 – 9 May 1976
- Teams: 18 (from 9 associations)

Final positions
- Champions: (Mexico) Atlético Español
- Runners-up: (Suriname) Transvaal

The 1975 CONCACAF Champions' Cup was the 11th edition of the annual international club football competition held in the CONCACAF region (North America, Central America and the Caribbean), the CONCACAF Champions' Cup. It determined that year's club champion of association football in the CONCACAF region and was played from 5 July 1975 till 9 May 1976.

The teams were split in 3 zones (North American, Central American and the Caribbean), each one qualifying the winner to the final tournament, where the winners of the North and Central zones played a semi-final to decide who was going to play against the Caribbean champion in the final. All the matches in the tournament were played under the home/away match system.

Mexican club Atlético Español beat Surinamese side Transvaal in the finals 3–0 and 2–1, becoming CONCACAF champion for their first time.

== North American Zone ==
=== First round ===
5 July 1975	Monterrey (Mexico)	2–0	(Canada) Serbian White Eagles	San Nicolás de los Garza, Nuevo León
	Alfredo Jiménez 33'; Jose Sánchez 90+'			Stadium: Estadio Universitario; Attendance: 18,000; Referee: Mile Wortf

13 July 1975	Serbian White Eagles (Canada)	1–1 (1–3 agg.)	(Mexico) Monterrey	Toronto, Ontario
	Mike Wareika 35'	[ Report]	Romeo Corbo 6'	Stadium: CNE Stadium; Attendance: 2500; Referee: Henry Landauer
Note: Abandoned at 1–1 in 67' due to fight

- Monterrey advanced to Second Round.

=== Second round ===
28 September 1975	Atlético Español (Mexico)	1–1	(Mexico) Monterrey	Puebla, Mexico
	Ramírez 66' (pen.)		11' González	Stadium: Estadio Cuauhtémoc

9 October 1975	Monterrey (Mexico)	0–1 (1–2 agg.)	(Mexico) Atlético Español	San Nicolás de los Garza, Mexico
			26' Urbina	Stadium: Estadio Universitario

- Atlético Español advanced to CONCACAF Final Series.

== Central American Zone ==
=== First round ===
Torneo Centroamericano de Concacaf 1975

4 May 1975	Motagua (Honduras)	2–1	(Costa Rica) Herediano	Tegucigalpa, Honduras
	Salvador Bernárdez 4'; Pedro Caetano 59'		69' Vicente Wanchope	Stadium: Estadio Tiburcio Carías Andino

15 May 1975	Herediano (Costa Rica)	2–0 (3–2 agg.)	(Honduras) Motagua	Heredia, Costa Rica
	Fernando Montero 33'; Rafael Camacho 75'		Nil	Stadium: Estadio Eladio Rosabal Cordero

8 June 1975	Saprissa (Costa Rica)	4–1	(Honduras) España	San Juan de Tibás, Costa Rica
	Asdrúbal Paniagua 20' (pen.) 60'; Odir Jacques 36'; Carlos Santana 90'		Antonio Pavón 23'	Stadium: Estadio Ricardo Saprissa Aymá

15 June 1975	España (Honduras)	2–0 (3–4 agg.)	(Costa Rica) Saprissa	San Pedro Sula, Honduras
	Ramírez 8'; Mejía 28'		Nil	Stadium: Estadio Francisco Morazán

29 June 1975	Negocios Internacionales (El Salvador)	0–0	(Guatemala) Municipal	San Salvador, El Salvador
	Nil		Nil	Stadium: Estadio Flor Blanca

6 July 1975	Municipal (Guatemala)	2–1 (2–1 agg.)	(El Salvador) Negocios Internacionales	Guatemala City, Guatemala
	Julio César Anderson 62' 92'		Mario Méndez “Zurdo” 80'	Stadium: Estadio Doroteo Guamuch Flores

6 July 1975	Platense (El Salvador)	4–3	(Guatemala) Aurora	San Salvador, El Salvador
	Oscar Armando Payés 15'; Luis Cesar Condomi 28' 32'; Oscar Guerrero 39'		Sansogni; Morales 53'; Miguel Gustavo Perez 74'	Stadium: Estadio Flor Blanca; Referee: Julio Cesar Soto Paris

9 July 1975	Platense (El Salvador)	0-1 (4–4 agg.)	(Guatemala) Aurora	Guatemala City, Guatemala
	Nil		Miguel Gustavo Perez	Stadium: Estadio del Ejército
Note: Aurora advanced on away goals.

- Herediano, Saprissa, Municipal and Aurora advanced to the Second Round.

=== Second round ===
4 September 1975	Saprissa (Costa Rica)	2–0	(Costa Rica) Herediano	San Juan de Tibás, Costa Rica
	Odir Jacques			Stadium: Estadio Ricardo Saprissa Aymá

11 September 1975	Herediano (Costa Rica)	2–1 (2–3 agg.)	(Costa Rica) Saprissa	Heredia, Costa Rica
	Johnny Alvarado; Rafael Angel Camacho		Javier Jimenez	Stadium: Estadio Eladio Rosabal Cordero

14 September 1975	Municipal (Guatemala)	2–1	(Guatemala) Aurora	Guatemala city, Guatemala
	Felipe Antonio Carias		TBD	Stadium: Estadio Doroteo Guamuch Flores

17 September 1975	Aurora (Guatemala)	1–0 (2–2 agg.) (2–4 p)	(Guatemala) Municipal	Guatemala City, Guatemala
	Goal			Stadium: Estadio Doroteo Guamuch Flores

- Saprissa and Municipal advanced to the Third Round.

=== Third round ===
5 October 1975	Saprissa (Costa Rica)	2–2	(Guatemala) Municipal	San José, Costa Rica
	Odir Jacques; Gerardo Solano		Leonardo McNish; Julio Cesar Anderson	Stadium: Estadio Nacional de Costa Rica

12 October 1975	Municipal (Guatemala)	0–0 (2–2 agg.) (5–6 p)	(Costa Rica) Saprissa	Guatemala City, Guatemala
				Stadium: Estadio Doroteo Guamuch Flores

- Saprissa advanced to CONCACAF Final Series.

== Caribbean Zone ==
=== Round 1 ===
Team 1	Agg.	Team 2	1st leg	2nd leg
Santos (Jamaica)	w/o	(Dominican Republic) Universidad Catolica		
Racing Haïtien (Haiti)	3 - 3*	(Suriname) Robinhood	2 - 0	1 - 3
Transvaal (Suriname)	2 - 6*	(Haiti) Violette	2 - 2	0 - 4*

- Universidad apparently disqualified due to the Dominican Republic's failure to pay CONCACAF dues.

Racing Haïtien (Haiti)	2–0	(Suriname) Robinhood
		Nil

Robinhood (Suriname)	3-1 (3-3 agg.)	(Haiti) Racing Haïtien

- Robinhood win on lots

Transvaal (Suriname)	2-2	(Haiti) Violette

Violette (Haiti)	4-0 (6-2 agg.)	(Suriname) Transvaal

- 2nd leg reportedly abandoned at 4-0 in 70'; Violette disqualified for using ineligible players.

=== Round 2 ===
Team 1	Agg.	Team 2	1st leg	2nd leg
Transvaal (Suriname)	4 - 2	(Jamaica) Santos	4 - 1	0 - 1
Robinhood (Suriname)	w/o	(Dominican Republic) Montecarlo		

- Monte Carlo disqualified due to the Dominican Republic's failure to pay CONCACAF dues

Transvaal (Suriname)	4-1	(Jamaica) Santos

Santos (Jamaica)	1-0 (2-4 agg.)	(Suriname) Transvaal

- Transvaal and Robinhood advanced to Round 3.

=== Round 3 ===
Team 1	Agg.	Team 2	1st leg	2nd leg
Transvaal (Suriname)	1 - 0	(Suriname) Robinhood	1 - 0	0 - 0

Transvaal (Suriname)	1–0	(Suriname) Robinhood

Robinhood (Suriname)	0-0 (0-1 agg.)	(Suriname) Transvaal

- Transvaal advance to the CONCACAF Champions' Cup Final.

== Semi-final ==
Team 1	Agg.	Team 2	1st leg	2nd leg
Saprissa (Costa Rica)	2–4	(Mexico) Atlético Español	1–2	1–2

- Transvaal bye to the CONCACAF Final.

18 January 1976	Saprissa (Costa Rica)	1–2	(Mexico) Atlético Español	San Juan de Tibás, Costa Rica
				Stadium: Estadio Ricardo Saprissa Aymá

20 January 1976	Atlético Español (Mexico)	2–1 (4–2 agg.)	(Costa Rica) Saprissa	San Juan de Tibás, Costa Rica
				Stadium: Estadio Ricardo Saprissa Aymá

both legs in San Juan de Tibás

- Atlético Español advance to the CONCACAF Final.

== Final ==
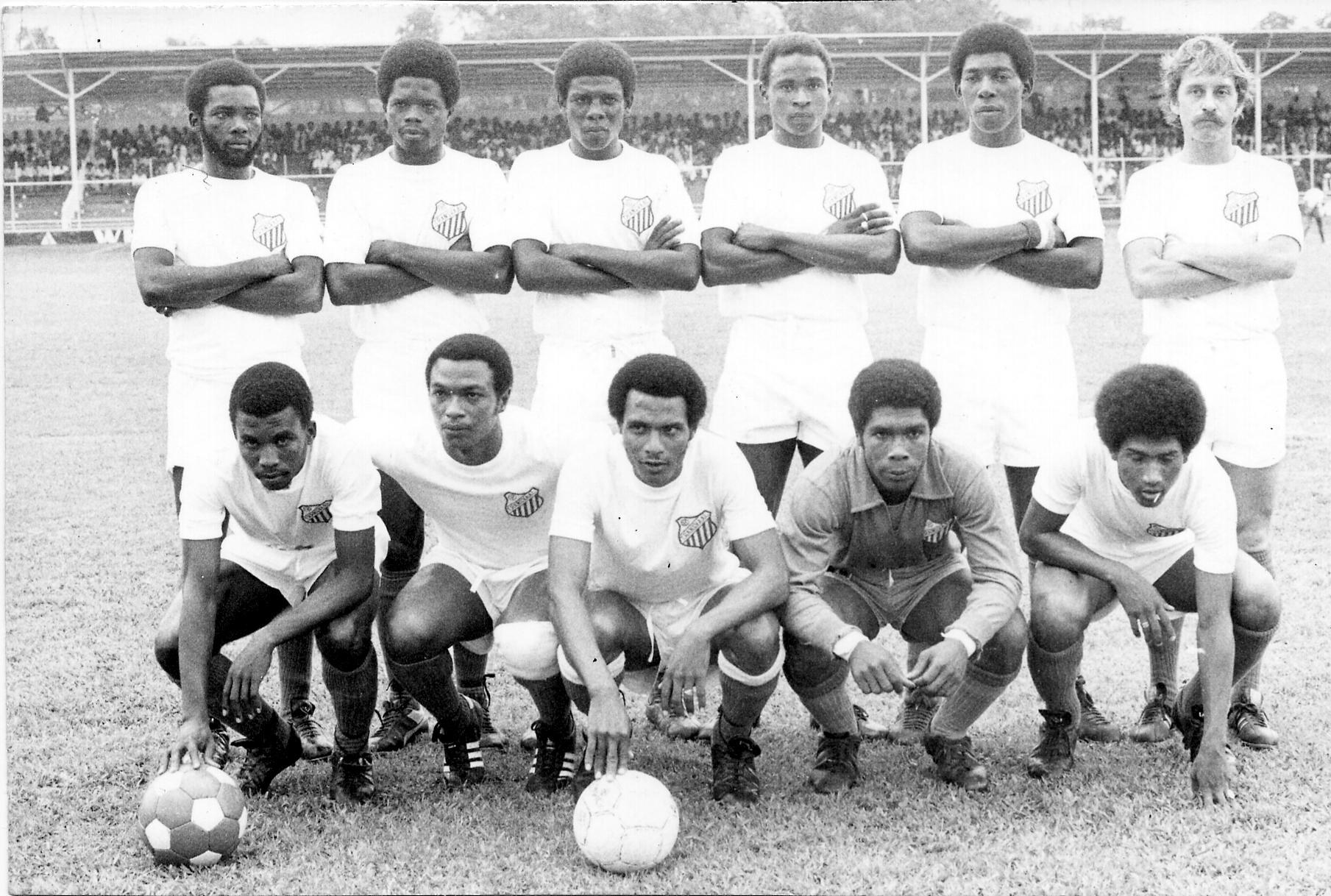
The Transvaal team before the start of the first leg.

=== First leg ===
1975 CONCACAF Champions' Cup Final
March 7, 1976
First leg

Transvaal (Suriname)	0–3	(Mexico) Atlético Español
	Report	Borbolla 14'; Rodríguez 35'; Urbina 63'

National Stadium, Paramaribo

=== Second leg ===
March 9, 1976
Second leg

Atlético Español (Mexico)	2–1	(Suriname) Transvaal
Ramírez 28'; Isordia 83'	Report	Vanenburg 8'

National Stadium, Paramaribo

both legs in Paramaribo

Atlético Español won 4–0 on points (5–1 on aggregate)

== Champion ==
CONCACAF Champions' Cup
1975 Champion
(Mexico)
Atlético Español
First title
