= Club Sport Herediano =

Association football club in Heredia

Herediano
- Full name: Club Sport Herediano
- Nicknames: El Team (The Team); Los Florenses (The Florists); Los Rojiamarillos (The Red and Yellows)
- Founded: June 12, 1921; 105 years ago
- Ground: Estadio Eladio Rosabal Cordero
- Capacity: 8,700
- President: Jafet Soto
- Head coach: (Argentina) José Giacone
- League: Liga Promerica
- 2024 Apertura: 1st
- Website: www.herediano.com
Home colours	Away colours	Third colours

Club Sport Herediano (Spanish pronunciation: [kluβ (e)spoɾt eɾeˈðjano]), commonly known as Herediano and nicknamed El Team, is a Costa Rican multisport club based in Heredia, Heredia province. Although they compete in a number of different sports, Herediano is best known for its football team. It plays in the Primera División de Costa Rica, the top tier of the Costa Rican football league system. Herediano are one of two clubs to have never been relegated.

Herediano has its origins in 1918. The framework for Asociación Deportiva Club Sport Herediano was simmering since June 1920, with the appointment of an interim board with iconic figures like Manuel Joaquín Gutiérrez, Eladio Rosabal, Víctor Manuel Ruiz, Claudio Arguedas and Luis Valerio, but it was not until June 12, 1921 that the Herediano Charter was signed. In that same year, Eladio Rosabal Cordero became the first manager of the Costa Rica national football team, and Herediano player Manuel Joaquín Gutiérrez became the first scorer of the national team.

The club's first season resulted in Herediano winning the national championship in 1921, the first edition of Costa Rica's top-flight league. Herediano established itself as a major force in Costa Rican football by winning 28 First Division titles through 2019.

El Team plays its home matches at the Estadio Eladio Rosabal Cordero. Herediano's home kit is composed of red and yellow vertical striped shirts, with red shorts, accompanied by yellow and red socks. This combination has been used since 1929. Pirma are the kit manufacturers. Herediano holds many long-standing rivalries, most notably against Alajuelense, Saprissa and Cartaginés. It has contributed many key and famous players towards Costa Rica's FIFA World Cup squads such as Marvin Obando, Germán Chavarría, Claudio Jara, Mauricio Wright, Paulo Wanchope, David Myrie, Óscar Granados, José Miguel Cubero, and Daniel Cambronero.

== History ==
In 1918, Heredians sought to form a football club that would represent their province. Three local Heredian football clubs, Club Sport Renacimiento, Club Sport Juan J. Flores, and Club Sport Cristóbal Colón incorporated themselves to form Club Sport Herediano. Native Heredian football players such as José Joaquín "Toquita" Gutiérrez, Eladio Rosabal Cordero, Víctor Manuel Ruiz, Gilberto and Claudio Arguedas, and Luis Valerio (who all played in various clubs such as La Libertad and Gimnástica Española) united to sign the official constitution of CS Herediano in June 1921. On July 1, 1921, the first official action that CS Herediano took was to purchase land to create a football field. In the same year, CS Herediano began to pressure the Costa Rican government to form a local FA, and thus in 1921 the Federación Costarricense de Fútbol was formed and the first national championship was scheduled—which CS Herediano would win.

In 1925, CS Herediano embarked on its first international match when it had a six-game tour in Jamaica in which they won four, tied and lost one. In 1928 CS Herediano travelled to El Salvador to play several international matches against local clubs. They beat Cuscatlán twice, once by a score of 11–0 and then again 11–1. They also beat FAS in Santa Ana 4–0, and beat Sonsonate 8–0. The club's most historic victory came in 1932 in Costa Rica's National Stadium in La Sabana, when CS Herediano beat the Argentina National team 3–1. In its first decade of existence CS Herediano won 6 national titles, four of them consecutively. CS Herediano is considered the Costa Rican club team with the most international experience. They also won the 1988 "Copa Camel", beating in the process Mexican teams like Puebla and UAG Tecos on American soil. Recently, CS Herediano, also known as "Los Florenses", have ended a championship drought of 19 years (going back to the 1992–93 season) by winning the Verano 2012 tournament, in a brilliant display of attacking and offensive play in the final part of the season. After that, thousands of Herediano's fans celebrated the victory in the streets, displaying what some people now estimate is the biggest football celebration in the country's history. In those years 19 previous years, Costa Rica saw only four teams win the championship, Saprissa, Alajuelense, Liberia Mia, and Brujas. To CS Herediano's credit they were consistently at the finals, but victory seemed to escape their grasp. In the 2005–06 season, CS Herediano unveiled a new official team logo of a tiger grasping the letters CSH. Although this was supposed become the new image for the team, the original logo remained as the official shield of the team's uniform.

On May 19, 2012, Herediano put an end to a drought of titles by winning the 22nd against Santos de Guápiles with an aggregate score of 6–3.

However, despite this, Herediano were suffering severe financial trouble that was until American businessman David J. Patey who was working and residing in Costa Rica decided to form a consortium with his brothers (Mike and Mark) to purchase the club on October 30, 2012..

== Estadio Eladio Rosabal Cordero ==
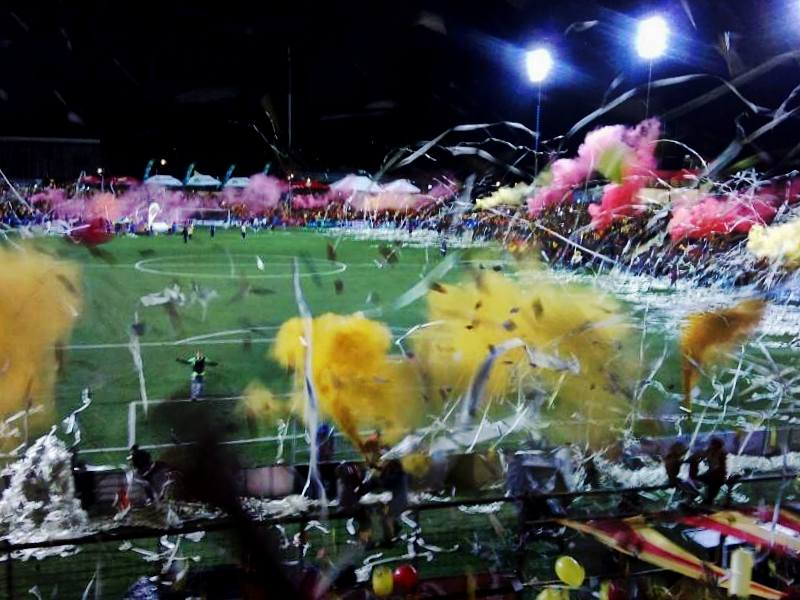
The Eladio Rosabal Cordero stadium during the 2013 Verano final

The construction of a stadium in the city of Heredia began on December 22, 1945, under the direction of Rafael Herrera Feluco (Drunk).

The Municipal Council of the Canton Central played a key role in donating two plots for this purpose to Club Sport Herediano, albeit with a number of conditions: the work must be completed within a five-year-period, providing the stage for other county's sporting events, and above all, the club cannot sell the property within a period of 99 years from the execution of the deed of sale and can only be mortgaged to invest these funds in the construction or maintenance of the property.

The construction of the stadium was managed by a loan from the Banco Nacional de Costa Rica, as well as inputs from the community, local organizations and the government of the Republic of Costa Rica itself.

The inaugural date is August 21, 1949, in which Herediano played its first match against the Gimnástica Española, with a score of 3–1. However, it has been discussed the opening day due to lack of a paper record that references this inaugural match to be considered the official opening game.

In 1964 the former manager Vicente Montero made a motion for the stadium to be named Eladio Rosabal Cordero. Thus, by the end of the decade of the 1960s the stadium was officially baptized under that name.

The stadium's lighting was installed that same year, and in 1974 broadcasting booths were finished. In the late seventies the south-sector-grandstand was built.

In early 2010, the grass was replaced by latest generation of synthetic turf with dimensions of 105.80 meters long and 68 meters wide.

The stadium had a capacity for 8,144 spectators, and was owned by the Asociacion Deportiva Club Sport Herediano. The bleachers were divided into: Sol General, Sol Numerado, Sombra Numerada and Palcos.

The stadium has undergone a complete reconstruction since 2020; although the completion has been pushed back by numerous delays, it is expected to be completed by late 2026.

== Kit ==
The first uniform was bought at the Tomas Salazar's Central Market stand, thanks to an economical contribution of Joaquín "Toquita" Gutierrez. The purchase was made for a dozen shirts, similar to the worn by the military in time of the Federico Tinoco government. Wearing a greyish jersey combined with white short pants; that is how Herediano showed to its first official championship match against Liga Deportiva Alajuelense – which was indeed, their first winning game-.

The distinctive usage of red and yellow as the club's colors began in 1926, when the Club Fortuna de Cuba visited Costa Rican soil for the second time in history. The manager of the Cuban team was interested in setting up a match with Herediano, but had the drawback that Herediano did not have a proper uniform for that kind of international events. The solution was found in the New Century Warehouse owned by Ramón Herrero, who had imported red-and-yellow-striped uniforms to be used by the Spanish Gymnastic Society team. At the end, the Hispanic team did not purchase them and once again Joaquín Gutiérrez made a deal to get the uniforms, which eventually became the emblematic jersey for the club.

The red and yellow colors were added in the statutes by a reform in 1929, which stated that official uniform is a vertical red/yellow striped shirt combined with black shorts and stockings. This provision remained for seventy years, until this was excluded from the current statutes. Herediano wore a sponsorship in its shirt for the first time in 1978, when the brand Toshiba was stamped on his chest.

=== Kit suppliers ===
Manufacturer	Period	Sponsor
None	1985–1987	(Japan) Sanyo (Japan) Toshiba
(Costa Rica) Sasso	1987–1992	(Costa Rica) Sasso
(Costa Rica) MTM	1993–1995	(United States) Fanta (Costa Rica) Coopenapo
(Costa Rica) Sportek	1995–1997	(United States) Fanta (Costa Rica) Mutual Heredia
(Costa Rica) TORINO	1997–1998	(Costa Rica) Mutual Heredia
(Spain) Kelme	2002–2004	(Costa Rica) 2x1 Pizza
(Costa Rica) Jugados	2004–2007	(Costa Rica) 2x1 Pizza (France) Peugeot (Costa Rica) Repretel
(Belgium) Patrick	2004–2007	(Mexico) Bimbo
(United Kingdom) Mitre	2007–2008	(Mexico) Coopemex
(Costa Rica) Jugados	2008	(United States) Coca-Cola (Japan) Panasonic
(Costa Rica) Jugados	2008	(United States) Western Union
(Costa Rica) Sportek	2009–2011	(South Korea) Samsung
(Costa Rica) Forza	2012–2014	(Costa Rica) Kolbi (Mexico) Roshfrans
(England) Umbro	2015–2021	(Costa Rica) Kolbi (Mexico) Roshfrans
(England) Umbro	2015–2021	(China) Huawei (Costa Rica) Kolbi
(England) Umbro	2015–2021	(Luxembourg) Tigo
(England) Umbro	2015–2021	(United States) Burger King (United States) Blu Smartphone
(England) Umbro	2015–2021	(Costa Rica) Don Pedro (Costa Rica) Telecable
(Mexico) Pirma	2021–2023	(Costa Rica) Kolbi (Costa Rica) Transcomer
(Italy) Diadora	2024	(Costa Rica) Banco Nacional (Costa Rica) Kolbi
(Italy) Diadora	2025	(United States) Burger King (Mexico) Electrolit
(Italy) Diadora	2025	(Costa Rica) Belcolor (United States) Taqueritos
(Italy) Diadora	2025	(Costa Rica) Hariana (United States) Popeyes
(Italy) Diadora	2025	(Costa Rica) Drasanvi (Costa Rica) Transcomer
(Italy) Diadora	2025	(Mexico) Gonher (Costa Rica) San Angel

Manufacturer	Period	Sponsor
(United States) Reebok	2026	(Costa Rica) Banco Nacional (United States) Taqueritos
(United States) Reebok	2026	(Costa Rica) Calox (Costa Rica) FUTV
(United States) Reebok	2026	(Costa Rica) Natufruit (Costa Rica) Transcomer
(United States) Reebok	2026	(China) Chery (United States) Taqueritos
(United States) Reebok	2026	(Mexico) Electrolit (Costa Rica) Gollo

== Team resume ==
- Seasons in First Division: 97 (since 1921).
- Best position in the league: 1
- Best position in the IFFHS ranking:
  - Historical:
  - Latest: 151 (November 2012)
- First official match: Alajuelense 1 – Herediano 3 (July 10, 1921, in Plaza Yglesias, Alajuela. Guillermo Pérez, Chavarría and Joaquín Manuel Gutiérrez scored for Herediano).
- Biggest score difference:
  - League matches: 8–0 against Alajuelense (1921), 12–1 against Juventud Mata Redonda (1928), 9–0 against Corsarios (1930), 9–0 against Club Sport México (1932), 8–0 against Gimnástica Española (1960).
  - International matches: 8–0 against Alpha United (2011), 8–0 against Vida SC (1980), 8–0 a Fortuna (1926), 11–0 against Hércules (1929), 11–1 against España FC (1929).
- All-time scorer: Claudio Jara (99 goals).
- Most games played player: Germán Chavarría (493 games), Marvin Obando (480 games), Geovanny Jara (422 games).
- Most seasons played player: Anibal Varela (1932–57).
- Most championship winning player: Eladio Rosabal, Braulio Morales (8 titles each one) and Oscar Esteban Granados Maroto (10 titles).
- Most championship winning coach: Odir Jacques and Ismael Quesada (4 titles each one).
- Retired numbers: 6 (Retired in honor of Edgar Quesada).

== Honours ==
Club Sport Herediano is the third most winning club of the Costa Rican Primera División

=== Domestic ===
- Costa Rican Primera División
  - Champions (32): 1921, 1922, 1924, 1927, 1930, 1931, 1932, 1933, 1935, 1937, 1947, 1948, 1951, 1955, 1961 (ASOFUTBOL), 1978, 1979, 1981, 1985, 1987, 1992–93, 2012 Verano, 2013 Verano, 2015 Verano, 2016 Verano, 2017 Verano, 2018 Apertura, 2019 Apertura, 2021 Apertura, 2024 Apertura, 2025 Apertura, 2026 Clausura
- Costa Rican Cup
  - Champions (11): 1924, 1935, 1939, 1945, 1945, 1947, 1954, 1955, 1956, 1959, 1961
  - Runners-up (12): 1925, 1929, 1935, 1937, 1937, 1950, 1956, 1960, 1965, 1972, 2015, 2022
- Costa Rican Super Cup
  - Champions (4): 2020, 2022, 2024, 2026
  - Runners-up (3): 1979, 2012, 2023

=== Continental ===
- CONCACAF League
  - Champions (1): 2018

== Performance in international competitions ==
The following is a list of results for Herediano in international competitions. Herediano's scores are listed first.

Year	Tournament	Round	Opponent	Home	Away	Agg.
1962	CONCACAF Champions' Cup	First Round	(Mexico) Guadalajara	0–3	0–2	0–5
1971	Copa Fraternidad	Group Stage	(Guatemala) Cementos Novella		0–1	
1971	Copa Fraternidad	Group Stage	(El Salvador) Atlético Marte	2–1		
1971	Copa Fraternidad	Group Stage	(El Salvador) Alianza		0–1	
1971	Copa Fraternidad	Group Stage	(Guatemala) Comunicaciones	2–1		
1971	Copa Fraternidad	Group Stage	(Costa Rica) Saprissa	1–1		
1971	Copa Fraternidad	Group Stage	(El Salvador) Atlético Marte		1–1	
1971	Copa Fraternidad	Group Stage	(Guatemala) Cementos Novella	3–0		
1971	Copa Fraternidad	Group Stage	(El Salvador) Alianza	2–1		
1971	Copa Fraternidad	Group Stage	(Costa Rica) Saprissa		1–1	
1971	Copa Fraternidad	Group Stage	(Guatemala) Comunicaciones		0–2	
1972	Copa Fraternidad	Group Stage	(El Salvador) Juventud Olímpica		0–0	
1972	Copa Fraternidad	Group Stage	(Costa Rica) Saprissa		2–2	
1972	Copa Fraternidad	Group Stage	(Guatemala) Comunicaciones	0–2		
1972	Copa Fraternidad	Group Stage	(El Salvador) Atlético Marte	5–1		
1972	Copa Fraternidad	Group Stage	(Guatemala) Cementos Novella		2–2	
1972	Copa Fraternidad	Group Stage	(El Salvador) Juventud Olímpica	2–1		
1972	Copa Fraternidad	Group Stage	(Costa Rica) Saprissa		1–1	
1972	Copa Fraternidad	Group Stage	(Guatemala) Comunicaciones		1–0	
1972	Copa Fraternidad	Group Stage	(El Salvador) Atlético Marte		2–1	
1972	Copa Fraternidad	Group Stage	(Guatemala) Cementos Novella	2–2		
1975	Copa Fraternidad	Group Stage	(El Salvador) Negocios Internacionales		1–1	
1975	Copa Fraternidad	Group Stage	(Guatemala) Municipal	2–1		
1975	Copa Fraternidad	Group Stage	(El Salvador) Platense		0–1	
1975	Copa Fraternidad	Group Stage	(Costa Rica) Saprissa		1–4	
1975	Copa Fraternidad	Group Stage	(Guatemala) Aurora	1–2		
1975	Copa Fraternidad	Group Stage	(El Salvador) Negocios Internacionales	1–0		
1975	Copa Fraternidad	Group Stage	(Guatemala) Municipal		1–0	
1975	Copa Fraternidad	Group Stage	(El Salvador) Platense	1–1		
1975	Copa Fraternidad	Group Stage	(Costa Rica) Saprissa	2–0		
1975	Copa Fraternidad	Group Stage	(Guatemala) Aurora		5–3	
1975	CONCACAF Champions' Cup	First Round	(Honduras) Motagua	2–0	1–2	3–2
1975	CONCACAF Champions' Cup	Second Round	(Costa Rica) Saprissa	2–1	0–2	2–3
1978	Copa Fraternidad	First Round	(El Salvador) FAS	0–0	0–2	0–2
1980	CONCACAF Champions' Cup	First Round	(Honduras) Marathón	3–1	0–3	3–4
1983	Copa Fraternidad	Group Stage	(El Salvador) Atlético Marte		1–1	
1983	Copa Fraternidad	Group Stage	(El Salvador) Águila		1–1	
1987	CONCACAF Champions' Cup	Second Round	(El Salvador) Águila		1–1	
1987	CONCACAF Champions' Cup	Second Round	(Honduras) Olimpia		0–0	
1987	CONCACAF Champions' Cup	Second Round	(Guatemala) Galcasa		2–0	
1987	CONCACAF Champions' Cup	Third Round	(Honduras) Real España		3–2	
1987	CONCACAF Champions' Cup	Third Round	(Costa Rica) Saprissa		1–4	
1987	CONCACAF Champions' Cup	Third Round	(Honduras) Olimpia		2–1	
1989	CONCACAF Champions' Cup	First Round	(Guatemala) Municipal		3–2	
1989	CONCACAF Champions' Cup	First Round	(Honduras) Olimpia		1–2	
1989	CONCACAF Champions' Cup	First Round	(El Salvador) Cojutepeque		3–1	
1989	CONCACAF Champions' Cup	Second Round	(Honduras) Real España		3–1	
1989	CONCACAF Champions' Cup	Second Round	(Costa Rica) Cartaginés		2–2	
1989	CONCACAF Champions' Cup	Second Round	(Honduras) Olimpia		1–2	
1989	CONCACAF Champions' Cup	Third Round	(Mexico) Leones Negros UdeG	2–1	1–1	3–2
1989	CONCACAF Champions' Cup	Fourth Round	(Mexico) Pumas UNAM	1–1	1–5	2–6
1994	CONCACAF Champions' Cup	Preliminary Round	(Nicaragua) Diriangén	4–2	5–0	9–2
1994	CONCACAF Champions' Cup	First Round	(Honduras) Olimpia	2–0	0–0	2–0
1994	CONCACAF Champions' Cup	Second Round	(Mexico) Atlante	3–3	1–3	4–6
1997–98	Torneo Grandes de Centroamérica	Group Phase	(El Salvador) Águila		2–0	
1997–98	Torneo Grandes de Centroamérica	Group Phase	(Honduras) Olimpia	2–1		
1997–98	Torneo Grandes de Centroamérica	Group Phase	(Guatemala) Municipal		0–1	
1997–98	Torneo Grandes de Centroamérica	Group Phase	(El Salvador) Águila	3–0		
1997–98	Torneo Grandes de Centroamérica	Group Phase	(Honduras) Olimpia		1–2	
1997–98	Torneo Grandes de Centroamérica	Group Phase	(Guatemala) Municipal	0–1		
2004	UNCAF Interclub Cup	First Round	(Panama) Tauro	3–0	3–0	6–0
2004	UNCAF Interclub Cup	Quarter-finals	(Honduras) Olimpia	2–3	1–0	3–3
2009–10	CONCACAF Champions League	Preliminary Round	(Mexico) Cruz Azul	2–6	0–0	2–6
2011–12	CONCACAF Champions League	Preliminary Round	(Guyana) Alpha United	8–0	2–2	10–2
2011–12	CONCACAF Champions League	Group Stage	(Mexico) Monterrey	0–5		
2011–12	CONCACAF Champions League	Group Stage	(Guatemala) Comunicaciones		0–2	
2011–12	CONCACAF Champions League	Group Stage	(United States) Seattle Sounders FC	1–2		
2011–12	CONCACAF Champions League	Group Stage	(United States) Seattle Sounders FC		1–0	
2011–12	CONCACAF Champions League	Group Stage	(Mexico) Monterrey		0–1	
2011–12	CONCACAF Champions League	Group Stage	(Guatemala) Comunicaciones	4–1		
2012–13	CONCACAF Champions League	Group Stage	(United States) Real Salt Lake	1–0		
2012–13	CONCACAF Champions League	Group Stage	(Panama) Tauro		1–0	
2012–13	CONCACAF Champions League	Group Stage	(Panama) Tauro	2–1		
2012–13	CONCACAF Champions League	Group Stage	(United States) Real Salt Lake		0–0	
2012–13	CONCACAF Champions League	Quarter-finals	(United States) Los Angeles Galaxy	0–0	1–4	1–4
2013–14	CONCACAF Champions League	Group Stage	(Haiti) Valencia		6–1	
2013–14	CONCACAF Champions League	Group Stage	(Mexico) Cruz Azul		0–3	
2013–14	CONCACAF Champions League	Group Stage	(Haiti) Valencia	4–2		
2013–14	CONCACAF Champions League	Group Stage	(Mexico) Cruz Azul	1–2		
2014–15	CONCACAF Champions League	Group Stage	(El Salvador) Isidro Metapán	4–0		
2014–15	CONCACAF Champions League	Group Stage	(Mexico) León		1–1	
2014–15	CONCACAF Champions League	Group Stage	(El Salvador) Isidro Metapán		4–2	
2014–15	CONCACAF Champions League	Group Stage	(Mexico) León	2–1		
2014–15	CONCACAF Champions League	Quarter-finals	(Honduras) Olimpia	2–0	1–1	3–1
2014–15	CONCACAF Champions League	Semi-finals	(Mexico) América	3–0	0–6	3–6
2015–16	CONCACAF Champions League	Group Stage	(El Salvador) Isidro Metapán	3–0		
2015–16	CONCACAF Champions League	Group Stage	(Mexico) Tigres UANL	1–1		
2015–16	CONCACAF Champions League	Group Stage	(El Salvador) Isidro Metapán		0–2	
2015–16	CONCACAF Champions League	Group Stage	(Mexico) Tigres UANL		0–0	
2016–17	CONCACAF Champions League	Group Stage	(Panama) Plaza Amador		1–1	
2016–17	CONCACAF Champions League	Group Stage	(Mexico) Tigres UANL	1–3		
2016–17	CONCACAF Champions League	Group Stage	(Panama) Plaza Amador	2–0		
2016–17	CONCACAF Champions League	Group Stage	(Mexico) Tigres UANL		0–3	
2018	CONCACAF Champions League	Round of 16	(Mexico) Tigres UANL	2–2	1–3	3–5
2018	CONCACAF League	Round of 16	(El Salvador) Santa Tecla	1–0	1–2	2–2
2018	CONCACAF League	Quarter-finals	(Panama) Universitario	3–0	2–1	5–1
2018	CONCACAF League	Semi-finals	(Panama) Árabe Unido	2–0	0–1	2–1
2018	CONCACAF League	Final	(Honduras) Motagua	2–0	1–2	3–2
2019	CONCACAF Champions League	Round of 16	(United States) Atlanta United FC	3–1	0–4	3–5
2019	CONCACAF League	Round of 16	(Jamaica) Waterhouse	1–1	1–1	2–2
2020	CONCACAF League	Round of 16	(Nicaragua) Real Estelí	0–1		
2022	CONCACAF League	Round of 16	(Canada) Pacific FC	0–1	1–0	1–1
2022	CONCACAF League	Quarter-finals	(Honduras) Real España	1–1	1–3	2–4
2023	CONCACAF Central American Cup	Group Stage	(Nicaragua) Diriangén		1–1	
2023	CONCACAF Central American Cup	Group Stage	(El Salvador) Águila	2–0		
2023	CONCACAF Central American Cup	Group Stage	(Honduras) Real España	3–2		
2023	CONCACAF Central American Cup	Group Stage	(Guatemala) Comunicaciones		2–1	
2023	CONCACAF Central American Cup	Quarter-finals	(Guatemala) Comunicaciones	3–2	0–0	3–2
2023	CONCACAF Central American Cup	Semi-finals	(Costa Rica) Alajuelense	2–2	2–2	4–4
2024	CONCACAF Champions Cup	Round One	(Mexico) Toluca	1–2	3–2	4–4
2024	CONCACAF Champions Cup	Round of 16	(Suriname) Robinhood	2–0	1–1	3–1
2024	CONCACAF Champions Cup	Quarter-finals	(Mexico) Pachuca	0–5	1–2	1–7
2024	CONCACAF Central American Cup	Group Stage	(Panama) Tauro	1–0		
2024	CONCACAF Central American Cup	Group Stage	(Nicaragua) Diriangén		1–0	
2024	CONCACAF Central American Cup	Group Stage	(Panama) San Francisco		1–0	
2024	CONCACAF Central American Cup	Group Stage	(Honduras) Motagua	1–1		
2024	CONCACAF Central American Cup	Quarter-finals	(Honduras) Motagua	0–0	2–2	2–2
2024	CONCACAF Central American Cup	Semi-finals	(Nicaragua) Real Estelí	2–2	0–0	2–2
2025	CONCACAF Champions Cup	Round One	(United States) Real Salt Lake	0–0	2–1	2–1
2025	CONCACAF Champions Cup	Round of 16	(United States) LA Galaxy	1–0	1–4	2–4
2025	CONCACAF Central American Cup	Group Stage	(Honduras) Real España	4–2		
2025	CONCACAF Central American Cup	Group Stage	(Nicaragua) Diriangén		2–4	
2025	CONCACAF Central American Cup	Group Stage	(Panama) Sporting San Miguelito		0–2	
2025	CONCACAF Central American Cup	Group Stage	(Guatemala) Municipal	4–4		
2026	CONCACAF Central American Cup	Group Stage	(Honduras) Marathón	0–0		
2026	CONCACAF Central American Cup	Group Stage	(El Salvador) Alianza		0–1	
2026	CONCACAF Central American Cup	Group Stage	(Nicaragua) Real Estelí		2–0	
2026	CONCACAF Central American Cup	Group Stage	(Guatemala) Antigua	2–1		

=== Record by opponent ===
Team	Pld	W	D	L	GF	GA	GD	WPCT
(El Salvador) Águila	5	3	2	0	9	2	+7	60.00
(Costa Rica) Alajuelense	2	0	2	0	4	4	0	0.00
(El Salvador) Alianza	3	1	0	2	2	3	−1	33.33
(Guyana) Alpha United	2	1	1	0	10	2	+8	50.00
(Mexico) América	2	1	0	1	3	6	−3	50.00
(Guatemala) Antigua	1	1	0	0	2	1	+1	100.00
(Panama) Árabe Unido	2	1	0	1	2	1	+1	50.00
(Mexico) Atlante	2	0	1	1	4	6	−2	0.00
(United States) Atlanta United FC	2	1	0	1	3	5	−2	50.00
(Guatemala) Aurora	2	1	0	1	6	5	+1	50.00
(El Salvador) Atlético Marte	5	3	2	0	11	5	+6	60.00
(Costa Rica) Cartaginés	1	0	1	0	2	2	0	0.00
(Mexico) Cruz Azul	4	0	1	3	3	11	−8	0.00
(Guatemala) Cementos Novella	4	1	2	1	7	5	+2	25.00
(El Salvador) Cojutepeque	1	1	0	0	3	1	+2	100.00
(Guatemala) Comunicaciones	9	5	1	3	12	11	+1	55.56
(Nicaragua) Diriangén	5	3	1	1	13	7	+6	60.00
(Nicaragua) Real Estelí	4	1	2	1	4	3	+1	25.00
(El Salvador) FAS	2	0	1	1	0	2	−2	0.00
(Guatemala) Galcasa	1	1	0	0	2	0	+2	100.00
(Mexico) Guadalajara	2	0	0	2	0	5	−5	0.00
(El Salvador) Juventud Olímpica	4	2	2	0	4	2	+2	50.00
(United States) LA Galaxy	4	1	1	2	3	8	−5	25.00
(Mexico) León	2	1	1	0	3	2	+1	50.00
(Honduras) Marathón	3	1	1	1	3	4	−1	33.33
(El Salvador) Isidro Metapán	4	3	0	1	11	4	+7	75.00
(Mexico) Monterrey	2	0	0	2	0	6	−6	0.00
(Honduras) Motagua	7	2	3	2	9	7	+2	28.57
(Guatemala) Municipal	6	3	1	2	10	9	+1	50.00
(Honduras) Olimpia	12	5	3	4	15	12	+3	41.67
(Mexico) Pachuca	2	0	0	2	1	7	−6	0.00
(Canada) Pacific FC	2	1	0	1	1	1	0	50.00
(Panama) Plaza Amador	2	1	1	0	3	1	+2	50.00
(El Salvador) Platense	2	0	1	1	1	2	−1	0.00
(Mexico) Pumas UNAM	2	0	1	1	2	6	−4	0.00
(Honduras) Real España	6	4	1	1	15	11	+4	66.67
(Suriname) Robinhood	2	1	1	0	3	1	+2	50.00
(United States) Real Salt Lake	4	2	2	0	3	1	+2	50.00
(Costa Rica) Saprissa	9	2	4	3	11	16	−5	22.22
(United States) Seattle Sounders FC	2	1	0	1	2	2	0	50.00
(Panama) San Francisco	1	1	0	0	1	0	+1	100.00
(Panama) Sporting San Miguelito	1	0	0	1	0	2	−2	0.00
(Panama) Tauro	5	5	0	0	10	1	+9	100.00
(El Salvador) Santa Tecla	2	1	0	1	2	2	0	50.00
(Mexico) Tigres UANL	6	0	3	3	5	12	−7	0.00
(Mexico) Toluca	2	1	0	1	4	4	0	50.00
(Mexico) Leones Negros UdeG	2	1	1	0	3	2	+1	50.00
(Panama) Universitario	2	2	0	0	5	1	+4	100.00
(Haiti) Valencia	2	2	0	0	10	3	+7	100.00
(Jamaica) Waterhouse	2	0	2	0	2	2	0	0.00
Total	163	68	46	49	244	218	+26	41.72

Source: Results

== Player records ==
Most appearances (as of February 23, 2010)
#	Name	Career	Apps	Goals
1	(Costa Rica) Germán Chavarría	1978–95	493	
2	(Costa Rica) Marvin Obando	1979–90, 1997–98	480	
3	(Costa Rica) Geovanny Jara	1986–04	422	
4	(Costa Rica) Claudio Jara	1982–92, 1994–95	375	99
5	Róberth Arias	1999–11	362	
6	(Costa Rica) Carlos Camacho		319	
7	(Costa Rica) Mauricio Solís	1990–96, 2007–10	298	
8	(Costa Rica) Álvaro Grant	1956–73	298	
9	(Brazil) Nilton Nóbrega	1977–86	295	47
10	(Costa Rica) Kenneth Paniagua	1991–97, 2004	291	

Most goals (as of June 12, 2014)
#	Player	Career	Apps	Goals
1	(Costa Rica) Claudio Jara	1982–92, 1994–95	375	99
2	(Costa Rica) Fernando Montero	1973–1982		86
3	(Costa Rica) Mínor Díaz	2000–2005, 2012–2014	138	75
4	(Costa Rica) (Dominican Republic) Víctor Núñez	2010–2015, 2016–2017	153	65
5				
6				
7				
8				
9				
10				

== Players ==
=== Current squad ===
As of 21 August 2026 Note: Flags indicate national team as defined under FIFA eligibility rules; some limited exceptions apply. Players may hold more than one non-FIFA nationality.

No.	Pos.	Nation	Player
1	GK	CRC	Danny Carvajal
5	DF	CRC	Haxzel Quirós
8	MF	CRC	Allan Cruz
10	MF	CRC	Elias Aguilar
11	FW	CRC	Ronaldo Araya
16	DF	CRC	Darril Araya
20	DF	CRC	Reggy Rivera
21	DF	MEX	Everardo Rubio
22	MF	CRC	Aaron Murillo
24	DF	MEX	Sergio Rodríguez
25	MF	CRC	Emerson Bravo
26	MF	CRC	Eduardo Juárez
27	MF	CRC	Aarón Suárez

No.	Pos.	Nation	Player
31	GK	CRC	Alexandre Lezcano
32	FW	CRC	Abner Hudson
33	FW	PAR	Fernando Lesme
37	FW	CRC	Keysher Fuller
38	DF	HON	Getsel Montes
41	FW	CRC	Joyfer Chal
55	DF	CRC	Yurguin Román
88	MF	NCA	Ariel Arauz
92	GK	CRC	Anthony Walker
97	FW	CRC	Randall Leal
99	DF	CRC	Keyner Brown (Captain)
—	MF	MEX	Jesús Henestrosa

=== Out on loan ===
Note: Flags indicate national team as defined under FIFA eligibility rules; some limited exceptions apply. Players may hold more than one non-FIFA nationality.

No. / Pos. / Nation / Player	No. / Pos. / Nation / Player

== Historical list of coaches ==
- (Costa Rica) Joaquín Gutiérrez (1921–22)
- (Costa Rica) Eladio Rosabal (1924–27)
- (Costa Rica) Braulio Morales (1930)
- (Costa Rica) Eladio Rosabal (1931)
- (Costa Rica) Braulio Morales (1932)
- (Costa Rica) Gilberto Arguedas (1933)
- (Costa Rica) Milton Valverde (1937)
- (Costa Rica) Aníbal Varela (19??)
- (Costa Rica) Rafael Herrera (1943–44)
- (Costa Rica) Ismael Quesada (1947–48), (1951), (1955)
- (Costa Rica) Santiago Bonilla (1955)
- (Costa Rica) Francisco Sánchez (19??)
- (Costa Rica) Fernando Bonilla (19??)
- (Costa Rica) Maximiliano Villalobos (19??)
- (Costa Rica) Oscar Bejarano (19??)
- (Costa Rica) Manrique Quesada (19??)
- (Spain) Eduardo Toba Muiño (1961)
- (Costa Rica) Mario Murillo (1962–63)
- (Spain) Carlos Farrez (1964)
- (Spain) Eduardo Viso Abella (1965)
- (Costa Rica) Alfredo Piedra (1966)
- (Spain) Domingo Borja (1967)
- (Costa Rica) José Meza (1968)
- (Chile) Román Soto (1968)
- (Chile) Hugo Tassara (1969)
- (Costa Rica) Hernán Alvarado (1970)
- (Costa Rica) Edgar Quesada (1971)
- (Spain) Antonio Moyano (1972–73)
- (Uruguay) Orlando de León (1974)
- (Brazil) Odir Jacques (1978)
- (Costa Rica) Marvin Rodríguez (1979–80)
- (Brazil) Odir Jacques (1981–82)
- (Spain) Antonio Moyano (1984)
- (Brazil) Odir Jacques (1985–86)
- (Spain) Antonio Moyano (1987–89)
- (Uruguay) Orlando de León (1990–91)
- (Czech Republic) Josef Bouska (1991)
- (Spain) Juan Luis Hernández (1992–93)
- (Costa Rica) Rolando Villalobos (1993–94)
- (Uruguay) Carlos Miloc (1994–95)
- (Costa Rica) Álvaro Grant (1994–95)
- (Peru) Gustavo Merino (1995–96)
- (Costa Rica) Alexandre Guimarães (1996–97)
- (Costa Rica) Henry Duarte (1997–98)
- (Brazil) Odir Jacques (1997–98)
- (Uruguay) Carlos Oria (1998–99)
- (Uruguay) Fernando Sosa (1999–00)
- (Uruguay) Orlando de León (July 1, 1999 – March 28, 2000)
- (Croatia) Zlatko Petričević (March 29, 2000 – June 30, 2000)
- (Uruguay) Carlos Linaris (2000–01)
- (Brazil) Odir Jacques (2001)
- (Costa Rica) Roger Flores (2001–02)
- (Costa Rica) Carlos Watson (2001–02)
- (Spain) Ramón Vecinos (2002–03)
- (Uruguay) Ildo Maneiro (July 1, 2003 – Dec 31, 2003)
- (Spain) Enrique Rodriguez (2004)
- (Costa Rica) Ronald Mora (Jan 1, 2004 – June 30, 2005)
- (Portugal) Guillerme Farinha (July 1, 2005 – Dec 31, 2005)
- (Costa Rica) Carlos Watson (Jan 1, 2006 – Dec 31, 2006)
- (Costa Rica) Javier Delgado (Jan 1, 2007 – March 31, 2008)
- (Costa Rica) Paulo Wanchope (April 1, 2008 – June 30, 2009)
- (Costa Rica) Rónald Mora (July 1, 2009 – July 31, 2009)
- (Costa Rica) Kenneth Paniagua (interim) (Aug 1, 2009 – Aug 8, 2009)
- (Argentina) Salvador Ragusa (Aug 9, 2009 – Dec 31, 2009)
- (Costa Rica) Luis Diego Arnaez (Jan 1, 2010 – March 8, 2010)
- (Uruguay) Orlando de León (March 8, 2010 – Dec 31, 2010)
- (Argentina) Alejandro Giuntini (Jan 1, 2011 – Sept 5, 2011)
- (Costa Rica) Jafet Soto (Sept 5, 2011 – March 26, 2012)
- (Brazil) Odir Jacques (March 26, 2012 – Aug 25, 2012)
- (Costa Rica) Claudio Jara (Aug 25, 2012 – Dec 31, 2012)
- (Costa Rica) Mauricio Solís (Jan 3, 2013 – Feb 18, 2013)
- (Costa Rica) Marvin Solano (Feb 19, 2013 – March 28, 2014)
- (Uruguay) Eduardo Méndez (March 28, 2014 – Aug 29, 2014)
- (Costa Rica) Jafet Soto (Aug 29, 2014 – Dec 14)
- (Costa Rica) Mauricio Wright (Dec 2014 – April 28, 2015)
- (Brazil) Odir Jacques (April 28, 2015–15)
- (Costa Rica) Hernán Medford (2016 – Dec 2017)
- (Costa Rica) Jafet Soto (Dec 2017 – April 2018)
- (Colombia) Jaime de la Pava (May 2018– Sept 2018)
- (Costa Rica) Jafet Soto (September 2018– December 2020)
- (Mexico) Fernando Palomeque (December 2020 - February 2021)
- (Costa Rica) Luis Marin (February 2021 - May 2021)
- (Mexico) David Patiño (June 2021 - September 2021)
- (Costa Rica) Jeaustin Campos (September 2021 - February 2022)
- (Costa Rica) Jafet Soto (March 2022 - May 2022)
- (Costa Rica) Hernán Medford (May 2022 - November 2022)
- (Costa Rica) Geiner Segura (November 2022 - February 2023)
- (Costa Rica) Jafet Soto (February 2023 - April 2023)
- (Costa Rica) Jeaustin Campos (April 2023 - November 2023)
- (Mexico) Héctor Altamirano (January 2024 - June 2024)
- (Costa Rica) Wálter Centeno (July 2024 - August 2024)
- (Costa Rica) Jafet Soto (August 2024 - December 2024)
- (Costa Rica) Alexander Vargas (January 2025 - April 2025)
- (Costa Rica) Jafet Soto (April 2025 - June 2025)
- (Costa Rica) Pablo Salazar (June 2025 - August 2025)
- (Costa Rica) Hernán Medford (August 2025 - September 2025)
- (Costa Rica) Jafet Soto (September 2025 - December 2025)
- (Argentina) José Giacone (December 2025 - Present)
