= 1972 Copa Fraternidad =

Tournament details
- Teams: 12 (from 3 associations)

Final positions
- Champions: (Costa Rica) Saprissa (1st title)
- Runners-up: (Guatemala) Aurora

Tournament statistics
- Matches played: 59
- Goals scored: 165 (2.8 per match)

The Copa Fraternidad 1972 was the second Central American club championship played between 12 clubs.

== Teams ==
| Association | Team | Qualifying method | App. | Previous best | Coach | Captain |
|---|---|---|---|---|---|---|
| (Costa Rica) Costa Rica | Alajuelense | 1970–71 Champions | 1st | — | TBD | TBD |
| (Costa Rica) Costa Rica | Saprissa | 1970–71 Runners-up | 2nd | Runners-up (1971) | TBD | TBD |
| (Costa Rica) Costa Rica | Herediano | 1970–71 Third place | 2nd | 3rd (1971) | TBD | TBD |
| (Costa Rica) Costa Rica | Puntarenas | 1970–71 Fourth place | 1st | — | TBD | TBD |
| (El Salvador) El Salvador | Juventud Olímpica | 1971 Champions | 1st | — | TBD | TBD |
| (El Salvador) El Salvador | Alianza | 1971 Runners-up | 2nd | 5th (1971) | TBD | TBD |
| (El Salvador) El Salvador | Universidad | 1971 Third place | 1st | — | (El Salvador) Ricardo Tomasino | TBD |
| (El Salvador) El Salvador | Atlético Marte | 1971 Fourth place | 2nd | 4th (1971) | TBD | TBD |
| Guatemala | Comunicaciones | 1971 Champions | 2nd | Champions (1971) | (Peru) Walter Ormeno | TBD |
| Guatemala | Aurora | 1971 Runners-up | 1st | — | TBD | TBD |
| Guatemala | Municipal | 1971 Third place | 1st | — | TBD | TBD |
| Guatemala | Cementos Novella | 1971 Fourth place | 2nd | 6th (1971) | (Argentina) Cesar Viccino | TBD |

== Group I ==
| Comunicaciones (Guatemala) | 0 - 0 | (El Salvador) Atlético Marte |
|---|---|---|
| Nil | | Nil |

| Cementos Novella (Guatemala) | 3 - 3 | (Guatemala) Comunicaciones |
|---|---|---|
| TBD; TBD; TBD | | TBD; TBD; TBD |

| Juventud Olímpica (El Salvador) | 0 - 0 | (Costa Rica) Herediano |
|---|---|---|
| Nil | | Nil |

| Saprissa (Costa Rica) | 0 - 0 | (El Salvador) Atlético Marte |
|---|---|---|
| Nil | | Nil |

January 6, 1972

| Comunicaciones (Guatemala) | 3 - 1 | (El Salvador) Juventud Olímpica |
|---|---|---|
| Oscar Molina; Héctor Tambasco | | Juan Ramón Martínez |

January 6, 1972

| Atlético Marte (El Salvador) | 0 - 1 | (Guatemala) Cementos Novella |
|---|---|---|
| Nil | | Selvin Pennant |

| Saprissa (Costa Rica) | 2 - 2 | (Costa Rica) Herediano |
|---|---|---|
| TBD; TBD | | TBD; TBD |

| Cementos Novella (Guatemala) | 1 - 1 | (Costa Rica) Saprissa |
|---|---|---|
| TBD | | TBD |

| Atlético Marte (El Salvador) | 1 - 0 | (El Salvador) Juventud Olímpica |
|---|---|---|
| TBD | | Nil |

| Herediano (Costa Rica) | 0 - 2 | (Guatemala) Comunicaciones |
|---|---|---|
| Nil | | TBD; TBD |

24 January 1972

| Comunicaciones (Guatemala) | 0 - 0 | (Costa Rica) Saprissa |
|---|---|---|
| Nil | | Nil |

Estadio de Guatemala
24 January 1972

| Juventud Olímpica (El Salvador) | 0 - 2 | (Guatemala) Cementos Novella |
|---|---|---|
| Nil | | Selvin Pennant; Di Paula |

Estadio de El Salvador
24 January 1972

| Herediano (Costa Rica) | 5 - 1 | (El Salvador) Atlético Marte |
|---|---|---|
| TBD; TBD; TBD; TBD; TBD | | Zapata |

Estadio Nacional de Costa Rica
26 January 1972

| Cementos Novella (Guatemala) | 2 - 2 | (Costa Rica) Herediano |
|---|---|---|
| Hugo Peña; Haroldo Cordón | | Raymond Roy Nelson |

Estadio Doroteo “Mateo” Flores, Guatemala
27 January 1972

| Saprissa (Costa Rica) | 3 - 0 | (El Salvador) Juventud Olímpica |
|---|---|---|
| TBD; TBD; TBD | | Nil |

6 February 1972

| Comunicaciones (Guatemala) | 1 - 0 | (Guatemala) Cementos Novella |
|---|---|---|
| Molina | | Nil |

6 February 1972

| Herediano (Costa Rica) | 2 - 1 | (El Salvador) Juventud Olímpica |
|---|---|---|
| Raymond Roy Nelson; Rafael Camacho | | TBD |

6 February 1972

| Atlético Marte (El Salvador) | 1-2 | (Costa Rica) Saprissa |
|---|---|---|
| Juarandyr Dos Santos | | Hernan Morales; Edgar Marín |

| Cementos Novella (Guatemala) | 3 - 1 | (El Salvador) Atlético Marte |
|---|---|---|
| TBD; TBD; TBD | | TBD |

9 February 1972

| Juventud Olímpica (El Salvador) | 2 - 1 | (Guatemala) Comunicaciones |
|---|---|---|
| Juan Ramón Martínez 12'; Moisés González | | Héctor Horacio Tambasco |

9 February 1972

| Saprissa (Costa Rica) | 1 - 1 | (Costa Rica) Herediano |
|---|---|---|
| TBD | | TBD |

| Comunicaciones (Guatemala) | 0 - 1 | (Costa Rica) Herediano |
|---|---|---|
| Nil | | TBD |

| Saprissa (Costa Rica) | 4 - 1 | (Guatemala) Cementos Novella |
|---|---|---|
| TBD; TBD; TBD; TBD | | TBD |

February 18, 1972

| Atlético Marte (El Salvador) | 2 - 0 | (El Salvador) Juventud Olímpica |
|---|---|---|
| José Quintanilla 26'; Rivera 30' | | Nil |

| Cementos Novella (Guatemala) | 2 - 0 | (El Salvador) Juventud Olímpica |
|---|---|---|
| TBD; TBD | | Nil |

| Atlético Marte (El Salvador) | 1 - 2 | (Costa Rica) Herediano |
|---|---|---|
| Manuel Cañadas | | Jorge Di Palma |

| Saprissa (Costa Rica) | 2 - 1 | (Guatemala) Comunicaciones |
|---|---|---|
| TBD; TBD | | TBD |

March 1, 1972

| Juventud Olímpica (El Salvador) | 0 - 0 | (Costa Rica) Saprissa |
|---|---|---|
| Nil | | Nil |

5 March 1972

| Herediano (Costa Rica) | 2 - 2 | (Guatemala) Cementos Novella |
|---|---|---|
| Rafael Ángel Oviedo; Rafael Ángel Camacho | | Omar Sansoni; Haroldo Cordón |

Estadio: Nacional, de San José

=== Standings ===
| Pos | Team | Pld | W | D | L | GF | GA | GD | Pts |
|---|---|---|---|---|---|---|---|---|---|
| 1 | (Costa Rica) Saprissa | 10 | 4 | 6 | 0 | 15 | 7 | +8 | 14 |
| 2 | (Costa Rica) Herediano | 10 | 4 | 5 | 1 | 17 | 12 | +5 | 13 |
| 3 | (Guatemala) Cementos Novella | 10 | 4 | 4 | 2 | 17 | 14 | +3 | 12 |
| 4 | (Guatemala) Comunicaciones | 9 | 3 | 3 | 3 | 11 | 9 | +2 | 9 |
| 5 | (El Salvador) Atlético Marte | 9 | 2 | 2 | 5 | 7 | 13 | −6 | 6 |
| 6 | (El Salvador) Juventud Olímpica | 10 | 1 | 2 | 7 | 4 | 16 | −12 | 4 |

== Group II ==
| Aurora (Guatemala) | 0 - 1 | (El Salvador) Universidad |
|---|---|---|
| Nil | | Benigno Apodaca |

| Alianza (El Salvador) | 2 - 0 | (Costa Rica) Puntarenas |
|---|---|---|
| TBD; TBD | | Nil |

| Municipal (Guatemala) | 1 - 1 | (El Salvador) Universidad |
|---|---|---|
| TBD | | TBD |

| Alianza (El Salvador) | 2 - 1 | (Guatemala) Aurora |
|---|---|---|
| TBD; TBD | | TBD |

| Alajuelense (Costa Rica) | 5 - 1 | (Costa Rica) Puntarenas |
|---|---|---|
| TBD; TBD; TBD; TBD; TBD | | TBD |

9 January 1972

| Aurora (Guatemala) | 3 - 1 | (Guatemala) Municipal |
|---|---|---|
| TBD; TBD; TBD | | TBD |

9 January 1972

| Universidad (El Salvador) | 2 - 2 | (Costa Rica) Puntarenas |
|---|---|---|
| Cubillo; TBD | | TBD; TBD |

| Alajuelense (Costa Rica) | 1 - 0 | (El Salvador) Alianza |
|---|---|---|
| TBD | | Nil |

| Aurora (Guatemala) | 4 - 2 | (Costa Rica) Alajuelense |
|---|---|---|
| TBD; TBD; TBD; TBD | | TBD; TBD |

| Universidad (El Salvador) | 2 - 1 | (El Salvador) Alianza |
|---|---|---|
| TBD; TBD | | TBD |

| Puntarenas (Costa Rica) | 5 - 4 | (Guatemala) Municipal |
|---|---|---|
| TBD; TBD; TBD; TBD; TBD | | TBD; TBD; TBD; TBD |

| Aurora (Guatemala) | 2 - 0 | (Costa Rica) Puntarenas |
|---|---|---|
| TBD; TBD | | Nil |

January 21, 1972

| Alianza (El Salvador) | 2 - 0 | (Guatemala) Municipal |
|---|---|---|
| Jose Taneses; Jaime Portillo | | Nil |

| Alajuelense (Costa Rica) | 2 - 1 | (El Salvador) Universidad |
|---|---|---|
| TBD; TBD | | TBD |

| Municipal (Guatemala) | 3 - 0 | (Costa Rica) Alajuelense |
|---|---|---|
| TBD; TBD; TBD | | Nil |

| Universidad (El Salvador) | 1 - 1 | (Guatemala) Aurora |
|---|---|---|
| Victor "El Pato" Valencia | | TBD |

| Puntarenas (Costa Rica) | 3 - 2 | (El Salvador) Alianza |
|---|---|---|
| TBD; TBD; TBD | | TBD; TBD |

| Aurora (Guatemala) | 1 - 1 | (El Salvador) Alianza |
|---|---|---|
| TBD | | TBD |

February 4, 1972

| Universidad (El Salvador) | 1 - 0 | (Guatemala) Municipal |
|---|---|---|
| Rafael Bucaro | | Nil |

| Alajuelense (Costa Rica) | 2 - 0 | (Costa Rica) Puntarenas |
|---|---|---|
| TBD; TBD | | Nil |

13 February 1972

| Aurora (Guatemala) | 4 - 0 | (Guatemala) Municipal |
|---|---|---|
| Marco Fión 5'; Edgar Gonzalez 20' 27'; Flores own | | Nil |

13 February 1972

| Alianza (El Salvador) | 1 - 0 | (Costa Rica) Alajuelense |
|---|---|---|
| Elenilson Franco | | Nil |

13 February 1972

| Puntarenas (Costa Rica) | 4 - 4 | (El Salvador) Universidad |
|---|---|---|
| TBD; TBD; TBD; TBD | | Pipo Rodríguez; Rafel Bucaro; Benigno Apodaca |

| Municipal (Guatemala) | 1 - 0 | (Costa Rica) Puntarenas |
|---|---|---|
| TBD | | Nil |

| Alajuelense (Costa Rica) | 1 - 2 | (Guatemala) Aurora |
|---|---|---|
| TBD | | TBD; TBD |

24 February 1972

| Municipal (Guatemala) | 1 - 0 | (El Salvador) Alianza |
|---|---|---|
| TBD | | Nil |

24 February 1972

| Universidad (El Salvador) | 2 - 2 | (Costa Rica) Alajuelense |
|---|---|---|
| Pipo Rodríguez; Benigno Apodaca | | TBD; TBD |

| Puntarenas (Costa Rica) | 2 - 2 | (Guatemala) Aurora |
|---|---|---|
| TBD; TBD | | TBD; TBD |

| Alajuelense (Costa Rica) | 2 - 0 | (Guatemala) Municipal |
|---|---|---|
| TBD; TBD | | Nil |

March 1, 1972

| Universidad (El Salvador) | 2 - 1 | (El Salvador) Alianza |
|---|---|---|
| Luis Ernesto Tapia; Lito Robles | | Salvador Mariona |

=== Standings ===
| Pos | Team | Pld | W | D | L | GF | GA | GD | Pts |
|---|---|---|---|---|---|---|---|---|---|
| 1 | (Guatemala) Aurora | 10 | 5 | 3 | 2 | 20 | 11 | +9 | 13 |
| 2 | (El Salvador) Universidad | 10 | 4 | 5 | 1 | 17 | 14 | +3 | 13 |
| 3 | (Costa Rica) Alajuelense | 10 | 5 | 1 | 4 | 17 | 14 | +3 | 11 |
| 4 | (El Salvador) Alianza | 10 | 4 | 1 | 5 | 12 | 11 | +1 | 9 |
| 5 | (Guatemala) Municipal | 10 | 3 | 1 | 6 | 11 | 18 | −7 | 7 |
| 6 | (Costa Rica) Puntarenas | 10 | 2 | 3 | 5 | 17 | 26 | −9 | 7 |

- Playoff for 1st place.
March 7, 1972

| Universidad (El Salvador) | 0 - 1 | (Guatemala) Aurora |
|---|---|---|
| | | Gonzalez |

== Final ==
10 March 1972

| Aurora (Guatemala) | 1 - 1 | (Costa Rica) Saprissa |
|---|---|---|
| Jorge Roldán ~ 79' (pen) | Report | Jaime Grant 8' |

Estadio Doroteo Guamuch Flores, Ciudad de Guatemala, Guatemala
Attendance: ~15000
Referee: Marco Dorantes (MEX)

15 March 1972

| Saprissa (Costa Rica) | 1 - 0 | (Guatemala) Aurora |
|---|---|---|
| Odir Jacques 22' | Report |

Estadio Nacional, San José, Costa Rica
Attendance: 13878
Referee: Javier Galindo (MEX)

== Champion ==
1972 Copa Fraternidad champion

Saprissa
1st title
