= Julio César Anderson =

Guatemalan footballer (1947–2021)

Personal information
- Full name: Julio César Anderson Quiroga
- Date of birth: 27 November 1947
- Place of birth: Tiquisate, Guatemala
- Date of death: 7 August 2021 (aged 73)
- Position: Striker

Senior career*
Years	Team	Apps	(Gls)
1967–1969	Suchitepéquez		
1969–1975	Municipal		
1975	Atlético Potosino		
1975–1984	Municipal		
?–1987	Aurora		

International career
1969–1977	Guatemala		
Medal record
Men's football
Representing Guatemala
CONCACAF Championship
Runner-up	1969 Costa Rica
- * Club domestic league appearances and goals

Julio César Anderson Quiroga (27 November 1947 – 7 August 2021) was a Guatemalan professional football striker who played the majority of his career for C.S.D. Municipal, in the Liga Mayor A, the top tier in the country. He was on the squad when it won the 1974 CONCACAF Champions' Cup. When he retired, he was the club's all-time leading goalscorer, and was the top scorer of the Liga Nacional three straight years. He was briefly in Mexico's top league, the Primera División.

He also was a member of the Guatemala national team, he played at the 1976 Olympic Games and in two World Cup qualifying campaigns.

== Club career ==
Born in Tiquisate, Escuintla, Anderson began his professional career with Deportivo Suchitepéquez in 1967, who originally contracted him for Q 75. He remained there until 1 April 1969, when Municipal acquired him for a Q 3000 fee.

Anderson played 11 years for Municipal, and along with players such as Alberto López Oliva, Benjamín Monterroso, and Emilio Mitrovich, formed the core of the team that went on to win the CONCACAF Champions' Cup in 1974 and played the Copa Interamericana against CA Independiente of Argentina. In 1973 Municipal won the Liga Mayor title and continued its successful run that season by winning the 1974 Copa Fraternidad where they faced the top clubs of Central America, with Anderson scoring goals against C.S. Cartaginés (two goals), C.D. Águila (two goals), and Aurora F.C. (two goals) to help the team advance to the 1974 CONCACAF Champions' Cup. Municipal would win that title as well, with Anderson contributing to victories against CD Marathón 4–0 on aggregate (where he scored two goals), CD Motagua 4–0 on aggregate (scored once), and Alianza FC, before facing SV Transvaal in the final, won 4–2 on aggregate by Municipal, with Anderson scoring once. Municipal won the domestic league title again in 1974, and Anderson was the top scorer of the season with 26 goals, including a hat-trick against arch-rivals Comunicaciones in a 7–3 win.

In 1975, by recommendation of Argentine coach Luis Grill Prieto, he had a stint with Atlético Potosino in the Mexican First Division, and although he performed well, scoring against several teams, he decided to return to Guatemala due to the unwelcoming behaviour of his teammates.

Following his return to Municipal, he became the league's top scorer twice more, in 1975 (tied with Selvin Pennant with 33 goals), and 1976 (17 goals). Overall, he scored 164 goals with Municipal, becoming the highest scorer in the club's history, until his record was surpassed by Juan Carlos Plata. Anderson remains as of 2011 the team's second highest scorer ever. Having also played for Aurora F.C., he retired from playing in 1987, having scored 209 goals in 549 top division league matches during his career according to the IFFHS, being the third highest scorer ever in the Guatemalan top flight and ranking among the 300 highest scorers in history.

== International career ==
Anderson was first called up to the Guatemala national team in 1969, participating at the IV CONCACAF Championship. In 1972 and 1973, he appeared in five matches during 1974 World Cup qualifying. On 1 July 1976 he scored the only goal of a 1–0 win in a friendly match against Costa Rica, coming off the bench. He was then part of the national team at the 1976 Olympic Tournament, playing in the match against Michel Platini's France that Guatemala lost 4–1. He played in eight matches and scored one goal during the 1978 World Cup qualifying campaign, including his last cap, in a 2–2 draw against El Salvador at the Estadio Azteca on 23 October 1977.

== Honours ==
Municipal

- Liga Mayor: 1969–70, 1974, 1976
- Copa Fraternidad: 1974
- CONCACAF Champions' Cup: 1974
- Liga Mayor top scorer: 1974, 1975, 1976

Guatemala

- CONCACAF Championship: Runner-up, 1969
