= Hugo Ottensen =

Chilean footballer (1946–2020)

Personal information
- Full name: Héctor Hugo Ottensen Bravo
- Date of birth: 25 August 1946
- Place of birth: Calama, Chile
- Date of death: 29 August 2020 (aged 74)
- Height: 1.77 m (5 ft 10 in)
- Position: Forward

Youth career
- Santiago Bueras

Senior career*
Years	Team	Apps	(Gls)
1966–1967	O'Higgins	12	(0)
1970–1971	Antofagasta Portuario	41	(7)
1972	Águila		
1973–1974	Cementos Novella		
1974–1977	Alianza		
1978–1979	Independiente Nacional		
1979–1980	Chalatenango		
- * Club domestic league appearances and goals

Héctor Hugo Ottensen Bravo (25 August 1946 – 29 August 2020), known as Hugo Ottensen, was a Chilean footballer who played as a forward for clubs in Chile, Guatemala and El Salvador.

== Career ==
As a child, Ottensen was with Club Santiago Bueras, where he coincided with his later fellow in Antofagasta Portuario, Germán Puchi. Ottensen played for both O'Higgins and Antofagasta Portuario in the top level of the Chilean football.

Then, he moved abroad and played for Águila in El Salvador and Cementos Novella in Guatemala before joining Alianza, where he coincided with his compatriots Enrique Iturra and Miguel Hermosilla between 1974 and 1977. As an achievement, he became the top goalscorer of the 1976 Copa Fraternidad with 8 goals.

After he played for Independiente Nacional and Chalatenango.

== Personal life ==
Ottensen made his home in El Salvador and died of heart attack on 29 August 2020.

== Honours ==
Individual

- Copa Fraternidad top goalscorer: 1976
