= Selvin Pennant =

Guatemalan footballer

Personal information
- Full name: Selvin Valentín Pennant Taylor
- Date of birth: 4 January 1950 (age 76)
- Place of birth: Guatemala City, Guatemala
- Height: 1.78 m (5 ft 10 in)
- Position: Forward

Senior career*
Years	Team	Apps	(Gls)
1969	Tipografía Nacional		
1970–1973	Cementos Novella		(57)
1974–1976	Aurora		
1977–1979	Deportes Aviación	76	(24)
1980–1982	Aurora		

International career
1969–1980	Guatemala		
Medal record
Men's football
Representing Guatemala
CONCACAF Championship
Runner-up	1969 Costa Rica
- * Club domestic league appearances and goals

Selvin Valentín Pennant Taylor (born 4 January 1950) is a Guatemalan former footballer and one of that country's most prolific goalscorers ever. He played for Deportes Aviación in the Chilean First Division for three years, and was a member of the Guatemala national team from 1969 to 1980, playing in three World Cup qualifying campaigns and at the 1976 Olympic Tournament.

== Club career ==
Pennant, a centre forward with strong aerial game, began his professional career with Tipografía Nacional in 1969, where he played along his two brothers, before he moved to Cementos Novella, where he was joint top scorer of the 1972 league season, and sole top scorer the following year. As Cementos Novella disappeared after the 1973 season due to lack of sponsorship, Pennant joined Aurora F.C., where he would excel as well as he was top scorer again in the 1975 season with 33 goals, tied with Municipal's Julio César Anderson, and leading the team to their fourth ever national championship and first since 1968. Aurora went on to win the 1976 Copa Fraternidad by beating some of the best teams in Central America, including defending champions Platense, thanks in good part to the attacking duo Pennant and René Morales each contributing with a tournament-high seven goals to the successful run. Pennant's domestic and international exploits prompted Chilean Club Deportes Aviación to require his services.

Coach Hernán Carrasco Vivanco brought Pennant to Aviación for the 1977 season, and in his first year there, the striker scored seven goals in the league and two in the domestic cup. The following season, Pennant scored another seven goals, as Aviación improved to an 8th-place finish. Pennant's best season in Chilean football was his third (1979), when he scored ten league goals – seven of which came in the first seven matches, including a hat-trick against Everton de Viña del Mar. Unlike the previous seasons, the 1979 season had an initial group phase to qualify to a final knockout phase, and Aviación, despite having the third best record overall, fell one point short of qualifying as they finished third in a group which included Colo Colo and Club Universidad de Chile.

He returned to Guatemala in 1980, again playing for Aurora, where he would retire in 1982 after having scored 87 career goals for the club – third-most ever behind Jorge Roldán (111) and Edgar Arriaza (88) – and over 190 goals during his entire career.

== National team ==
Pennant was first selected to the Guatemala national team in 1969, appearing at the IV CONCACAF Championship that year. In 1971, he was a member of the national squad that attempted to qualify to the 1972 Olympic Games, without success. Four years later, however, he helped Guatemala qualify to the 1976 Games in Montreal, where he started against Israel (0-0), played the last 15 minutes of a 1–4 loss against Michel Platini's France, and the match against Mexico (1-1).

Pennant also played in the 1974, 1978 (where he missed the final round in Mexico in October 1977 having migrated to Chile), and 1982 World Cup qualifying processes. During the latter, on 26 November 1980, Pennant scored in a 3–0 win against Costa Rica which as of 2011 is the last time Guatemala has beaten Costa Rica away. Overall, Pennant scored 5 goals in 11 World Cup qualification matches.

== Honours ==
Aurora

- Guatemala Liga Mayor winner: 1975
- Torneo Fraternidad / UNCAF Club Championship winner: 1976
- Guatemala Liga Mayor top scorer: 1972, 1973, 1975

Guatemala

- CONCACAF Championship: Runner-up, 1969
