= Gerardo Solano =

Costa Rican footballer (1953-2000)

Personal information
- Full name: Luis Gerardo Solano Chavarría
- Date of birth: 24 December 1953
- Place of birth: San José, Costa Rica
- Date of death: January 12, 2000 (aged 46)
- Place of death: Santa Cruz, Costa Rica
- Positions: Striker; winger

Youth career
- Colegio Saint Francis
- 1971–1972: Saprissa

Senior career*
Years	Team	Apps	(Gls)
1972–1979	Saprissa	227	
1980	Herediano		

International career
1975–1980	Costa Rica	9	(2)
- * Club domestic league appearances and goals

Luis Gerardo Solano Chavarría (24 December 1953, in San José – 12 January 2000) was a Costa Rican professional footballer who played most of his career for Deportivo Saprissa and Herediano in the 1970s.

== Club career ==
Solano was a member of the Saprissa squad that won six consecutive championships from 1972 to 1977, a record both in Costa Rica as well as in the Americas. He was the team's goalscorer with 57 in this period. He was the club's joint-leading scorer with eleven goals in 1973 and he played the most games for Saprissa in the 1970s. He played in 79 international club games.

Solano also won three titles with Herediano.

== International career ==
Solano appeared in 9 matches for the full Costa Rica national football team from 1975 to 1980.

== Death ==
Solano died of a heart attack while running in the city centre of Santa Cruz on 12 January 2000.
