= C.D. Juventud Olímpica =

- Full name: Club Deportivo Juventud Olímpica
- Nickname(s): Juventud Olímpica, Academia Azul y Oro azu, Azul y Oro
- Founded: 1937 (as Juventud Olimpica A), 1940 (as Club Deportivo Juventud Olimpica)
- Dissolved: 2007
- Ground: San Salvador, El Salvador
- Manager: (El Salvador) TBD
Home colours

Club Deportivo Juventud Olímpica, commonly known as Juventud Olímpica was a Salvadoran professional football club based in San Salvador.

== History ==
On January 13, 1939, the club merged with Maya to be named Juventus, however one year the club reverted to its old name leaving for Club Maya to become defunct. In 1974–1975, the club rebranded itself as Negocios Internacionales and it only lasted one year reverting to Juventud Olímpica. The club continued to play until they withdrew from the Salvadoran Primera División after the 1978/79 season. The last played in ADFA San Salvador, fourth division of the salvadoran in 2019.

== Honours ==
These Honours are updated to February 2022. Throughout its history, the club has managed several national and regional titles. These include two Primera division titles.

=== Domestic honours ===
==== League ====
- Primera División and predecessors
  - Champions (2): 1971, 1973

Runners-up (4): 1952–53, 1963–64, 1972, 1974–75

== Records ==
=== Concacaf competitions record ===
Competition	Played	Won	Drawn	Lost	GF	GA
Copa Interclubes UNCAF	30	6	5	19	25	49
CONCACAF Champions League	8	1	3	5	9	12
TOTAL	38	7	8	'24	34	61

- Copa Interclubes UNCAF: 2 appearances

Best: Fifth Place
1973 : Fifth Place
1975 : Sixth Place

- CONCACAF Champions League: 3 appearances

Best: Second Round
1973 : First Round
1974 : Second Round
1975 : First Round

=== Historical Matches ===
1943 Friendly	Juventud Olimpica	3–0	C.S.D. Municipal	San Salvador, El Salvador
	Goal		Nil	Stadium: Estadio Flor Blanco

January 1, 1946 Friendly	Juventud Olimpica	1–4	Club Leon	San Salvador, El Salvador
	Miguel Deras		Goal	Stadium: TBD

September 14, 1956 Friendly	Juventud Olimpica	0–3	Brasil de Pelotas	San Salvador, El Salvador
	Nil		TBD; TBD; TBD	Stadium: TBD

December 3, 1971 Friendly	Juventud Olimpica	1–2	Czechoslovakia national football team	San Salvador, El Salvador
	Esteban Blanco		Goal	Stadium: TBD

== Notable players ==
- (El Salvador) Orlando “Calulo” Hernández

=== Team captains ===
Name	Years
(El Salvador) TBD	TBD
(El Salvador) Rene Toledo	1971-1973
(El Salvador) Guillermo Castro Loro	1976

== List of Coaches ==
Throughout its history, Juventud Olimpica has had many and varied coaches among its history, the two most noteworthy coaches are Argentinian Mario Carlos Rey and Juan Quarterone, as they both won primera division titles with Juventud Olimpica.

The following managers won at least one trophy when in charge of Juventud Olimpica
Name	Period	Trophies
(Argentina) Mario Carlos Rey	TBD, TBD, TBD, TBD	1 (1971 Primera División de Fútbol Profesional)
(Argentina) Juan Quarterone	TBD, TBD	1 (1973 Primera División de Fútbol Profesional)

- (Uruguay) (Brazil) Luis Comitante (1967)
- (Argentina) Mario Carlos Rey (1971- February 1972)
- (Argentina) Juan Quarterone (1973)
- (Argentina) Gregorio Bundio (1974)
- (El Salvador) Ricardo Tomasino (1974–1975)
- (El Salvador) Victor Manuel Ochoa (1975)
- (Guatemala) Walter Cifuentes (1999)
- (El Salvador) Luis Ángel León (2000)
- (El Salvador) Raúl Magaña (2001–2003)
- (Brazil) Jorge Tupinambá dos Santos
- (El Salvador) Santiago Chicas
- Mauro Liberia
