= René Morales =

Guatemalan footballer

Personal information
- Date of birth: 22 February 1953 (age 73)
- Position: Midfielder

International career
| Years | Team | Apps | (Gls) |
- Guatemala

René Morales (born 22 February 1953) is a Guatemalan former footballer. He competed in the men's tournament at the 1976 Summer Olympics.
