= Jorge Roldán =

Guatemalan footballer (1940–2023)

- Roldán in 1968

Personal information
- Full name: Jorge Roldán Popol
- Date of birth: 16 November 1940
- Place of birth: Guatemala City, Guatemala
- Date of death: 8 June 2023 (aged 82)
- Position: Midfielder

Senior career*
Years	Team	Apps	(Gls)
1958–1973	Aurora	380	(111)
1972	Hércules	7	(0)

International career
1961–1973	Guatemala	43	(2)

Managerial career
- 1974–1975: Aurora
- 1976: Platense
- 1976–1978: Once Municipal
- 1979–1982: Aurora
- 1985–1986: Aurora
- 1988: Guatemala U20
- 1988–1989: Guatemala
- 1992–1993: Aurora
- 1994–1995: Aurora
Medal record
Men's football
Representing Guatemala
CONCACAF Championship
Winner	1967 Honduras
Runner-up	1965 Guatemala
Runner-up	1969 Costa Rica
- * Club domestic league appearances and goals

Jorge Roldán Popol (16 November 1940 – 8 June 2023), known popularly as El Grillo ("cricket"), was a Guatemalan football coach and player.

A midfielder, Roldán played almost his entire career for the local team Aurora F.C., being perhaps the most emblematic individual ever to represent the club. He also became a member and later captain of the Guatemala national team, being part of the squad that won the 1967 CONCACAF Championship, and participating in the 1968 Olympic Games and in two World Cup qualifying campaigns.

Roldán managed clubs in Guatemala for over three decades, and coached the national team at all levels.

== Club career ==
Roldán debuted in the Guatemalan Liga Mayor with Aurora in 1958, at the age of 18, under coach Rubén Amorín. He helped Aurora win three national league titles in four years, in the 1964, 1966, and 1967–68 seasons, the first three championships ever won by the club. He played for Aurora from 1958 to 1973, and went on to become their captain; he scored 111 goals in all competitions for the club, being their highest goalscorer in history.

He helped Aurora reach the final of the 1972 Copa Fraternidad against Deportivo Saprissa, where in the first leg in Guatemala he scored via a penalty kick to equalize 1–1 which was the final score. In the second leg in Costa Rica, Aurora lost 1–0 which gave the title to Saprissa.

Roldán was the first Guatemalan footballer ever to play professionally for a club in Spain, when he was a member of Hércules CF in 1972. He retired from playing in 1974, and became a coach shortly after.

== International career ==
At the age of 18, Roldán was a member of the national youth squad that won the 1958 Juegos Centroamericanos Juveniles. He was not selected to the national squad that entered 1962 World Cup qualifying, and four years later, as FIFA did not accept Guatemala's entry to World Cup qualification, he missed another chance to play at World Cup qualifying level. However, he did make his senior international debut in 1961 at the 1961 CCCF Championship and since then he was a regular of the national squad, eventually becoming the team captain.

In March 1967 Roldán captained the Guatemala squad competing at the 1967 CONCACAF Championship, managed by his mentor Rubén Amorín. After collecting four wins (including a 1–0 against defending champions Mexico) and one draw in five matches, the Central American team took the title home for the first and only time in its history.

One year later, as Guatemala attempted to qualify to the 1968 Olympic tournament, he scored a goal against Costa Rica in a 3–2 loss on 26 May. Having previously beaten Costa Rica 1–0 and after extra time, the advancing team was decided on a coin toss, won by Guatemala went on to reach quarterfinals in the Olympic tournament in Mexico City, after first round wins over Czechoslovakia 1–0 and Thailand 4–1, with Roldán scoring the 2–1 go-ahead goal in the 55th minute.

Roldán appeared in two matches during the 1970 World Cup qualification, both against Haiti. Four years later, aged 33, he played all six matches of Guatemala's campaign at the 1973 CONCACAF Championship which served as the qualification tournament for the 1974 World Cup. There, he scored the opener of a 2–2 draw against Netherlands Antilles, and played his last international match, a 1–1 against Honduras on 15 December 1973.

== Coaching career ==
On 24 June 1973, Roldán retired from playing and began his coaching training. He went on to coach several teams, notably his former playing club Aurora. In 1975, he led them to their fourth league title. In 1976, he managed Once Municipal to promotion into the First Division of El Salvador. In 1979, back with Aurora, he won the IX Copa Fraternidad, and then won league titles again in 1986 and in the 1992–93 season, being, as of 2011, the last domestic coach to win a national title in Guatemala. The 1992–93 title was also the last championship won by Aurora.

Roldán also coached the Guatemala national team, during part of the 1990 World Cup qualifying campaign (where he was substituted by Rubén Amorín), at the 1988 Olympic tournament, and at the 1995 UNCAF Nations Cup. In 2004, prior to the qualifying tournament for the 2006 World Cup, he was named Director General of the national football teams. He assisted Ramón Maradiaga with player call-ups when the latter became coach of the Guatemala national team.

== Honours ==
=== As a player ===
Aurora

- Liga Mayor: 1964, 1966, 1967–68

Guatemala

- CONCACAF Championship: 1967; Runner-up, 1965, 1969

Guatemala youth

- 1958 Juegos Centroamericanos Juveniles: 1958

Individual

- Highest goalscorer in the history of Aurora F.C. (111)
- In 1999, the IFFHS voted Roldán the third best Guatemalan player of the 20th century, and 31st in CONCACAF.

=== As a coach ===
Aurora

- Guatemala Liga Mayor: 1975, 1986, 1992–93
- Copa Fraternidad: 1979
