= Ismael Díaz (Salvadoran footballer) =

Salvadoran footballer (1948-1981)

Personal information
- Full name: José Ismael Díaz
- Date of birth: February 20, 1948
- Place of birth: San Miguel, El Salvador
- Date of death: February 26, 1981 (aged 33)
- Place of death: San Miguel, El Salvador
- Position: Forward

Senior career*
Years	Team	Apps	(Gls)
- Dragón
1970–1976	Águila		

International career
	El Salvador	50	(13)
- * Club domestic league appearances and goals

José Ismael Díaz (February 20, 1948 – February 26, 1981) was a Salvadoran footballer.

== Club career ==
Nicknamed el Cisco, Díaz played for C.D. Dragón before joining the Juan Francisco Barraza-managed Águila.

== International career ==
Díaz played for his country's Olympic team in the 1972 and 1976 qualifiers and represented El Salvador in 3 FIFA World Cup qualification matches

== Death ==
In 1980, Díaz was murdered in San Miguel, while working in his taxi.
