= Fernando Montero =

Costa Rican footballer (born 1948)

Personal information
- Full name: Fernando Montero Mata
- Date of birth: 1 November 1948 (age 77)
- Place of birth: Limón, Costa Rica
- Position: Striker

Senior career*
| Years | Team | Apps | (Gls) |
| 1969–1970 | Limonense | | |
| 1971–1972 | Cartaginés | | |
| 1973–1982 | Herediano | | |
| 1975 | → Platense (loan) | | |
| 1981 | → Municipal (loan) | | |
| 1982 | Limonense | | |
| 1983 | Jade East Dynamos | | |
| 1983–1984 | El Carmen | | |
| 1985 | Águila | | |
| 1986 | Club España | | |

International career^{‡}
| 197?–1980 | Costa Rica | 10 | (2) |
- * Club domestic league appearances and goals ‡ National team caps and goals as of 27 April 2015

Fernando Montero Mata (born 1 November 1948) is a retired Costa Rican football striker.

== Club career ==
Nicknamed Macho, Montero most prominently played for Herediano with whom he won three league titles and became the league's top goalscorer in 1974 with 19 goals.

He also played for hometown club Limonense and had spells abroad in El Salvador, Guatemala, South Africa and the United States.

== International career ==
Montero represented Costa Rica in the 1976 and 1980 Olympic Games qualifiers and earned a total of 10 caps, scoring 2 goals.

== Personal life ==
Born in Limón to Emilio Montero and Consuelo Mata,"Macho" is married to Francini Soto Arguedas and they have 4 children.
