= Félix Pineda =

Salvadoran footballer

Personal information
- Full name: Félix Pineda Flores
- Place of birth: El Salvador
- Position: Striker

Senior career*
Years	Team	Apps	(Gls)
1970–1988	Águila		(118)

International career^{‡}
1972–1976	El Salvador	6	(0)
- * Club domestic league appearances and goals ‡ National team caps and goals as of 25 September 2011

Félix Pineda Flores (born in El Salvador) is a retired Salvadoran footballer.

== Club career ==
Nicknamed La Garrobita, Pineda played for Águila in the Barraza's Kinder Era in the middle of the 1970s.

== International career ==
Pineda played for the El Salvador national football team, appearing in 3 qualifying matches for the 1978 FIFA World Cup and 1 for the 1974 FIFA World Cup
