= Odir Jacques =

Brazilian footballer and manager

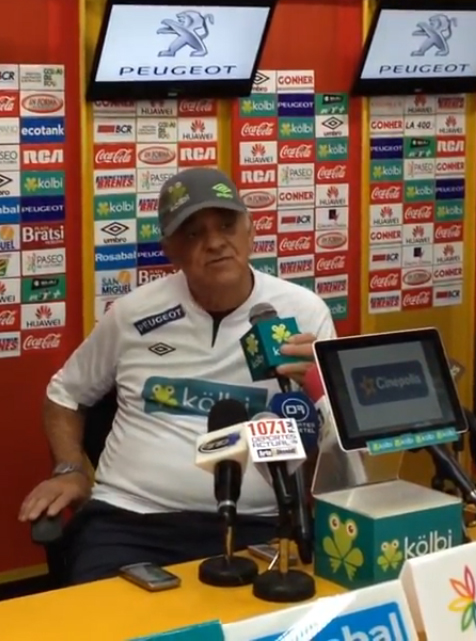
- Jacques in 2015

Personal information
- Full name: Odir Jacques Ferreira
- Date of birth: April 2, 1946 (age 80)
- Place of birth: Cantagalo, Brazil
- Height: 1.75 m (5 ft 9 in)
- Position: Striker

Youth career
- 1965–1966: Bangu

Senior career*
Years	Team	Apps	(Gls)
1962–1966	Bangu		
1967, 1970	FAS		
1968	Sonsonate		
1968	Alianza		(30)
1970	Atlético Marte		
1970–1971	Saprissa		
1971–1973	Herediano		
1973–1974	Saprissa		
1974–1975	Alajuelense		
1975–1976	Saprissa		
1976–1978	Herediano		
1978–1981	Alajuelense		
1981–1982	Limonense		

Managerial career
- 1978: Herediano
- 1981–1982: Herediano
- 1983: Alajuelense
- 1985: Alajuelense
- 1985: Herediano
- 1985–1987: Costa Rica
- 1988: Alajuelense
- 1991: Saprissa
- 1992–1993: Saprissa
- 1997–1998: Herediano
- 2000: FAS
- 2001: Herediano
- 2002: San Carlos
- 2005: Municipal Liberia
- 2006: Alianza
- 2008: Municipal Liberia
- 2012: Herediano
- 2012: Cartaginés
- 2013: Pérez Zeledón
- 2015: Herediano
- * Club domestic league appearances and goals

Odir Jacques Ferreira (born April 2, 1946) is a retired Brazilian soccer striker who played most of his career in Costa Rica.

== Club career ==
=== El Salvador ===
Before moving to Costa Rica, Jacques Ferreira started at Bangu in Brazil's Carioca League, then played for several years in El Salvador with Club Deportivo FAS. Although he did not win any trophies in his time with FAS, he did help them to reach the championship final for three consecutive seasons in 1967/68, 1969 and 1970. He was very well known and popular with the club's supporters as he was a very effective and consistent striker. In his few years in El Salvador he scored a total of 126 goals, and is currently still listed as one of the highest goalscorers of all time. He holds a scoring record still remaining untouched, scoring 30 goals in 36 games in 1968 with Alianza.

=== Costa Rica ===
From FAS, Ferreira moved to Saprissa, where he won several national championships, including the famous six consecutive championships won by Saprissa from 1972 to 1977, a record both in Costa Rica as well as in the American continent. He also played with Alajuelense and Herediano, before retiring at age 33.

Jacques was a notable goal scorer, with strong skills for shooting especially free kicks.

He was the best goal scorer in the 1972 Costa Rica's first division tournament, in which he scored 18 goals. He scored 5 goals in one game against Puntarenas in May 1972. He totalled 82 goals in the Costa Rican top tier.

He is considered by many experts, as the best foreigner to ever play in the Costa Rica's first division.

== Managerial career ==
After retiring, he began a very successful coaching career in Costa Rica, where he managed the three most important teams in the country, Deportivo Saprissa, Alajuelense and Herediano, becoming the only person to win a championship as a player and as a coach at the same time with Herediano in 1978. He won 3 championships with Herediano and 1 championship with Alajuelense under his coaching tenure. He also coached the Costa Rica's national squad in 1985. As a coach, he discovered Costa Rica national team player greats such as Oscar Ramirez, Rolando Fonseca and Mauricio Wright among others. He had a spell again in El Salvador with FAS whom he joined in June 2000 before returning to Costa Rica where he was dismissed by Municipal Liberia in March 2005.

In January 2006 he moved to El Salvador again to take charge at Alianza. He retook the reigns at Herediano in March 2012, left them for Cartaginés in August 2012 and coached them into the middle of 2013. Later that year he coached Perez Zeledón in the playoffs. but on already in May 2013 after only 4 games in the dug out.

Jacques is the manager who led Herediano during the most matches, 234 in total and has the highest win percentage of any coach in Herediano's history leading the red and yellow squad to an unprecedented 5 championships (most by any coach in the franchise history).

== Personal life ==
He met his wife Ana Cecilia in El Salvador and they have three children.
