= Aurora FC (Guatemala) =

Association football club in Guatemala

Aurora
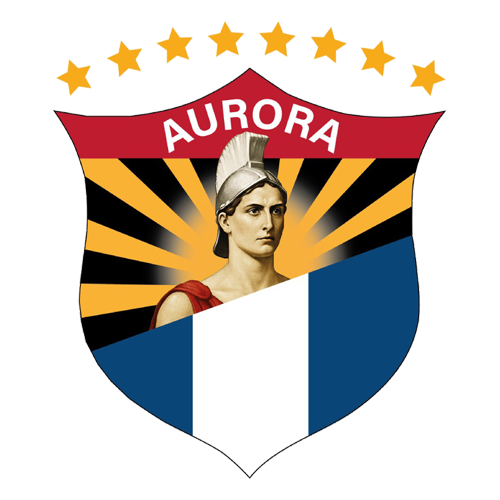
- Full name: Aurora Fútbol Club
- Nickname: Los Militares (The Military)
- Founded: 1945; 78 years ago
- Ground: Cementos Progreso
- Capacity: 14.022
- Chairman: Army of Guatemala
- Manager: (Costa Rica) Saúl Phillip
- League: Liga Guate
- Clausura 2025: Group B 2nd (promoted)
Home colours	Away colours

Aurora Fútbol Club (Spanish pronunciation: [awˈɾoɾa ˈfuðβol ˈkluβ]), is a Guatemalan professional football club. They compete in the Liga Bantrab, the top tier of Guatemalan football.

The team has historically has historically competed among Guatemala’s leading football clubs and has a local rivalry with Municipal and Comunicaciones. It has since been relegated to a lower division, while remaining the third-most successful team in Guatemalan football. Their uniform consists of a black and yellow vertically striped shirt and black shorts.

== History ==
The club is owned by the Guatemalan Army and was founded on April 14, 1945, as Aurora de la Guardia de Honor, a name that was shortened to Aurora F.C. in 1946. Having joined the Liga Mayor in 1947, they have won eight league titles, 10 second place finishes and two international titles.

During the 1960s decade, they won their first three national league titles, which came in a span of four years, in the 1964, 1966, and 1967–68 seasons. The three championships came under Uruguayan coach Rubén Amorín. In 1975, they won their fourth league title, repeating the feat in 1978. The 1970s also brought international success, as they won the Copa Fraternidad in 1976 by beating some of the best teams in Central America, including defending champions Platense, thanks in good part to the attacking duo Pennant and René Morales each contributing with a tournament-high seven goals to the successful run. Aurora would go on to win another Copa Fraternidad title in 1979. Two more league titles came in the 1980s, one in 1984 and the other in 1986, the former while being managed by coach Rubén Amorín and the latter under Jorge Roldán, who also led them to another title in the 1992–93 season, the eighth and last championship won by Aurora to date.

In 2005, they shocked local fans and media when they were relegated to Primera División after 60 years of playing in the top flight.

== Players ==
=== Current squad ===
Note: Flags indicate national team as defined under FIFA eligibility rules; some limited exceptions apply. Players may hold more than one non-FIFA nationality.

No.	Pos.	Nation	Player
1	GK	GUA	Diego Navas
2	DF	GUA	Luis Cardona
3	DF	GUA	Jairo Soriano
4	DF	GUA	Carlos Monterroso
5	DF	GUA	José Lemus
6	MF	GUA	Allan García (captain)
7	FW	GUA	Paulo André Motta
9	FW	GUA	Diego Ruiz
10	FW	ARG	Nicolas Lovato
11	FW	COL	Eddie Ibargüen
13	MF	GUA	Alejandro Galindo
14	FW	GUA	Andrés Echeverría
15	DF	GUA	Klisman García

No.	Pos.	Nation	Player
16	MF	GUA	Jorge Batres
17	MF	GUA	Daniel Bajan
20	MF	COL	José Luis Vivas
21	MF	ARG	Pablo Mingorance
22	GK	MEX	Liborio Sánchez
25	FW	GUA	Álex Díaz
27	MF	GUA	Jonathan Arévalo
28	MF	GUA	Jorge Ticurú
30	DF	GUA	Bryan Soriano
31	MF	GUA	Víctor Urias
35	FW	GUA	Juan Pablo Monterroso (on loan from Municipal)
67	FW	GUA	Jimmy Álvarez

== Personnel ==
=== Coaching staff ===
As of May 2026

Position	Staff
Coach	(Costa Rica) Saúl Phillip (*)
Assistant manager	(Guatemala) Byron De la Cruz (*)
Reserve manager	(Guatemala) TBD (*)
Goalkeeper Coach	(Guatemala) Oscar Tello (*)
Under 17 Manager	(Guatemala) TBD (*)
Under 15 Manager	(Guatemala) TBD (*)
Sporting director	(Guatemala) TBD (*)
Fitness Coach	(Guatemala) Herbet Martinez (*)
Team Doctor	(Guatemala) Dr. David Canizales (*)
Fitness Coach	(Guatemala) (*)
Physiotherapy	(Guatemala) Byron Rodriguez (*)
Utility	(Guatemala) Hugo Danilo Gil (*)
Utility	(Guatemala) Andy Chacon

== List of coaches ==
- (Uruguay) Rubén Amorín (1958–71), (1984)
- (Chile) Néstor Valdés Moraga (1973)
- (Guatemala) Jorge Roldán (1974–75), (1979), (1986–87), (1992–93), (1996–97)
- (Argentina) Omar Muraco (1975–76)
- (Costa Rica) Marvin Rodríguez (1978)
- (Argentina) Juan Quarterone (1980)
- (Guatemala) Carlos Alberto Mijangos (1988)
- (Guatemala) José Luis Estrada (1994–95)
- (Guatemala) Felipe Antonio Carías (2000)
- (Guatemala) Alfredo López (2001)
- (Guatemala) Mariano Aguirre (2007)
- (Uruguay) Gustavo Faral (2009)
- (Guatemala) Tomas Castillo
- (Argentina) Diego Cerutti (2021)
- (Uruguay) Gustavo Machaín (2021–2022)
- (Guatemala) Gabriel Castillo (2022–June 2023)
- (Argentina) Daniel Berta (July 2023-December 2024)
- (Costa Rica) (Guatemala) Saúl Phillip (January 2025 -Present)

== Honours ==
- Liga Nacional de Guatemala titles: 8

1964, 1966, 1967–68, 1975, 1978, 1984, 1986, 1992–93

- Primera División de Ascenso titles: 1

Apertura 2020

- Copa de Guatemala: 4

1958–59, 1967–68, 1968–69, 1984

- Copa Fraternidad: 2

Winners (2): 1976, 1979
Runner-up (3): 1972, 1975, 1983

== Performance in CONCACAF competitions ==
- CONCACAF Cup Winners Cup: 1 appearance

1994 – Finalist

- Campeón Copa Interclubes UNCAF: 2

1976, 1979
