= All-time C.D. Atlético Marte roster =

List of C.D. Atlético Marte players

This list comprises all players who have participated in at least one league match for C.D. Atlético Marte since the club's creation in 1950. Players who were on the roster but never appeared in a game are not listed.

A "†" denotes players who only appeared in a single match.

== A ==
- (Argentina) Agustín Adorni
- (El Salvador) Jose Luis Alvarado
- (El Salvador) Ernesto Aparicio

== B ==
- (Argentina) Rodolfo Baello
- (El Salvador) Fernando Barrios "el Gato"
- (Peru) Suarez Becerra
- (Italy) (Mexico) Ricardo Bellancanzone
- (El Salvador) Danilo Blanco
- (El Salvador) Carlos Castro Borja

== C ==
- (El Salvador) Salvador Cabezas
- (El Salvador) Jorge Salomón Campos
- (El Salvador) Milton Campos
- (El Salvador) Carlos Felipe Cañadas
- (El Salvador) Manuel Cañadas
- (El Salvador) Santana Cartagena
- (El Salvador) Adonay Castillo
- (Peru) Agustín Castillo
- (Honduras) Giovani Delgado Castillo
- (El Salvador) Guillermo Castro
- (Argentina) Ramiro Cepeda
- (Mexico) Roberto Clemente
- (Argentina) Luis Cesar Condomi
- (Sierra Leone) Abdul Thompson Conteh
- (El Salvador) Santiago Cortes

== D ==
- (El Salvador) Miguel Angel Diaz

== E ==
- (El Salvador) Nelson Escobar
- (El Salvador) Cristian Esnal
- (Uruguay) Raul Esnal

== F ==
- (El Salvador) Ramon Fagoaga
- (El Salvador) (Uruguay) Albert Fay
- (El Salvador) Francisco Francés "Paco"
- (El Salvador) Elenilson Franco
- (Argentina) Juan Fullana

== G ==
- (El Salvador) Manuel Garay "Tamalón"
- (El Salvador) Francisco Garcia
- (El Salvador) Ernesto Gochez
- (El Salvador) Mauricio Gonzalez Pachin
- (El Salvador) Miguel González

== H ==
- (El Salvador) Ivan Castro Herrera
- (El Salvador) Norberto Huezo
- (El Salvador) Wilfredo Huezo "el doctorcito"

== I ==
- (El Salvador) José Antonio Infantozzi "Tolín"
- (El Salvador) Wilfredo Iraheta

== J ==
- (Brazil) Odir Jacques

== L ==
- (El Salvador) Armando Larín
- (Uruguay) Alejandro Larrea
- (El Salvador) Gustavo Lucha "el Bordador"

== M ==
- (El Salvador) Raúl Magaña
- (Equatorial Guinea) Deogracias Abaga Edu Mangue
- (El Salvador) Roberto Garcia Maradiaga
- (Brazil) Rodinei Martins
- (Argentina) Gonzalo Mazzía
- (El Salvador) Julio César Mejía "Muñeca"
- (Dominican Republic) Oscar Mejia
- (El Salvador) Carlos Meléndez
- (El Salvador) Sergio Mendez
- (El Salvador) Conrado Miranda
- (El Salvador) Antonio Montes
- (El Salvador) Luis Guevara Mora
- (El Salvador) Roberto Morales

== N ==
- (El Salvador) (Brazil) Nildeson

== O ==
- (Mexico) Andres Ortega
- (Colombia) Marcelo Ospina

== P ==
- (El Salvador) Anibal Parada
- (Colombia) Carlos Parra
- (El Salvador) (Argentina) Emiliano Pedrozo
- (El Salvador) Jorge Pena
- (Honduras) Fabricio Perez
- (Argentina) Juan Bautista Perez
- (El Salvador) Mauricio Perla
- (Argentina) Geronimo Pericullo
- (El Salvador) René Pimentel
- (Argentina) Andres Puig

== Q ==
- (El Salvador) Mario Pablo Quintanilla
- (El Salvador) José Quintanilla

== R ==
- (El Salvador) Guillermo Ragazzone
- (El Salvador) Danis Cristopher Ramírez
- (El Salvador) Manuel Ramos
- (El Salvador) Jose Maria Rivas
- (El Salvador) Roberto Rivas
- (El Salvador) Alfredo Rivera
- (El Salvador) Luis Antonio Regalado "Loco"
- (Mexico) Ramon Rodriguez
- (El Salvador) Francisco Roque
- (El Salvador) William Rosales "el Pony"
- (El Salvador) José Luis Rugamas
- (El Salvador) Rutilio Rivera

== S ==
- (El Salvador) Dennis Salinas
- (Chile) Ricardo Sepulveda
- (Honduras) Nicolas Suazo

== T ==
- (El Salvador)
- (Panama) Luis Ernesto Tapia
- (Paraguay) Irineo Nunez Torres
- (El Salvador) Marcial Turcios

== U ==
- (Guatemala) Gabriel Urriola

== V ==
- (Mexico) Francisco Vargas
- (Argentina) Raul Pibe Vasquez
- (El Salvador) Alberto Villalta
- (El Salvador) Fernando Villalta
- (Uruguay) Mario Figueroa Viscarret

== Z ==
- (El Salvador) Luis Ramirez Zapata
