= List of Atletico Marte records and statistics =

This article lists various statistics related to Atletico Marte, a former football club in El Salvador. Atletico Marte last played in Clausura 2023 and finished in 11th place (out of 12) in the top tier.

== Honours ==
As of 8 February 2022, Atletico Marte have won 8 Primera División, 1 Segunda División, 1 Copa El Salvador, 1 UNCAF Champions' Cup and 1 CONCACAF Champions' Cup trophies.

=== Domestic ===
==== Leagues ====
- Primera División and predecessors
  - Champions (8): 1955, 1956, 1957, 1969, 1970, 1980–81, 1982, 1985
- Segunda División and predecessors
  - Champions (1): 2008 Apertura (Note: On June 14, 2009, the club won the right to be in the Primera División by defeating AFI-El Roble of Ilobasco in the Finals of the Segundo División.)
  - Promotion Play-off Winners: 2008–2009

==== Cups ====
- Copa El Salvador and predecessors
  - Champions (1) : 1991

=== CONCACAF ===
- CONCACAF Champions' Cup and predecessors
  - Runners-up (1): 1981
- CONCACAF Cup Winners Cup and predecessors
  - Champions (1): 1991

=== UNCAF ===
- UNCAF Champions' Cup/Recopa de la UNCAF and predecessors
  - Champions (1): 1991 Recopa de la UNCAF

=== Youth Team honours ===
Primera División Reserves:

- Champions (3): Apertura 1998, Clausura 2010, Apertura 2011

== Achievements ==
=== Copa El Salvador ===
==== Details ====
It was played between previous league champion LA firpo and regular season champion Atletico Marte. Atletico Marte won the match 2-1 to secure their 1st Torneo de Copa El Salvador. They were coached by Armando Contreras Palma and his assistant Juan Ramon Paredes. The following players were listed and played in the game for Atletico Marte: Lorenzo Hernandez, Romeo Lozano, Misael Rodriguez, Manuel Flores, Wilfredo Figueroa, Fernando Lazo, Manrique Torres, Santanna Cartagena, Saul Garay, Guillermo Flamenco, Rene Toledo, Brazilian Nildeson, Orsi Chicas and Manuel Diaz.

11 April 1991

Atletico Marte	2-1	LA Firpo
Nildeson 13'; Misael Rodriguez 59'		Mauricio Cienfuegos 14'

Estadio Nacional Flor Blanca, San Salvador
Referee: TBD

=== Recopa de UNCAF/1991 Copa Centroamericano ===
The matches featured Atletico Marte (Champion of Copa El Salvador), Comunicaciones (Champion of Guatemala), Saprissa (Champion of Costa Rica) and Real Esteli (Champion of Nicaragua). Atletico Marte won their first title Copa Centroamericano with two win and one draw. They were coached by Uruguayan Carlos Jurado and his assistant Juan Ramon Paredes. The following players were listed and played in the game for Atletico Marte: Efrain Alas, Uruguayan Jose Mario Figueroa and Jose Luis Cardozo, Peruvian Agustin Castillo, Martin Velasco, Rene Toledo, Oscar Arbizu

Pos	Team	Pld	W	D	L	GF	GA	GD	Pts	Qualification
1	Marte	3	2	1	0	5	1	+4	7	Champion
2	Comunicaciones	3	1	2	0	19	4	+15	5	
3	Saprissa	3	1	1	1	11	5	+6	4	
4	Real Esteli	3	0	0	3	1	26	−25	0	

Rules for classification: Tiebreakers

December 8, 1991 1991 Copa Centroamericano	Comunicaciones	1-1	Atletico Marte
	Marcelo Bauza 8'		Oscar Arbizu 73'

December 11, 1991 1991 Copa Centroamericano	Atletico Marte	1-0	Saprissa
	Jose Luis Cardozo 82'		Nil

December 11, 1991 1991 Copa Centroamericano	Atletico Marte	3-0	Real Esteli
	Oscar Arbizu 4' 59'; Rene Toledo 40'		Nil

=== Recopa de CONCACAF ===
The matches featured Atletico Marte (Champion of Copa Centroamericano), Comunicaciones (Runner up Copa Centroamericano), Racing Gonaïves (Champion of the Caribbean) and Universidad de Guadalajara (Champion of North America). Atletico Marte won their first CONCACAF title (1991 CONCACAF Cup Winners Cup with two win and one loss. They were coached by Juan Ramon Paredes and his assistant TBD. The following players were listed and played in the game for Atletico Marte: Efrain Alas, Wilfredo Iraheta, Marcial Turcios, Honduran Pastor Martinez, Romeo Lozano, Santana Cartagena, Carlos Castro Borja, Peruvian Agustin Castillo, Ricardo Garcia, Colombian Henry Velez, Uruguayan Jose Luis Cardozo, Oscar Arbizu, Guillermo Flamenco

Pos	Team	Pld	W	D	L	GF	GA	GD	Pts	Qualification
1	(El Salvador) Atlético Marte	3	2	0	1	5	2	+3	4	Champion
2	(Guatemala) Comunicaciones	3	1	2	0	2	1	+1	4	
3	(Mexico) U. de G.	3	1	1	1	2	2	0	3	
4	(Haiti) Racing Gonaïves	3	0	1	2	3	7	−4	1	

January 15, 1992 1991 CONCACAF Cup Winners Cup	Atletico Marte	1-0	Universidad de Guadalajara
	Efrain Alas 42'		Nil

January 17, 1992 1991 CONCACAF Cup Winners Cup	Atletico Marte	4-1	Racing Gonaïves
	Agustin Castillo; Efrain Alas; Oscar Arbizu		Daniel Daclinat

January 19, 1992 1991 CONCACAF Cup Winners Cup	Comunicaciones	1-0	Atletico Marte
	Edgar Arizala 40'		Nil

== International representation ==
=== Historical Matches ===
14 December, 1951 Friendly	Atletico Marte	1-2	CA Banfield	San Salvador, El Salvador
	TBD		TBD; TBD	Stadium: Estadio Flor Blanco

April 16, 1956 Friendly	Atletico Marte	0-2	Bonsucesso FC	San Salvador, El Salvador
	Nil		Décio Cuaresma Recaman; Walter Prado	Stadium: Estadio Flor Blanco

September 16, 1956 Friendly	Atletico Marte	3-4	Brasil de Pelotas	San Salvador, El Salvador
	TBD; TBD; TBD		TBD; TBD; TBD	Stadium: Estadio Flor Blanco

29 December 1957 Friendly	Atletico Marte	2-2	Cúcuta Deportivo	San Salvador, El Salvador
	TBD; TBD		TBD; TBD	Stadium: TBD

January 30, 1958 Friendly	Atletico Marte	1-3	Botafogo	San Salvador, El Salvador
	TBD		TBD; TBD; TBD	Stadium: Estadio Flor Blanco

February 3, 1966 Friendly	Atletico Marte	1-4	Botafogo	San Salvador, El Salvador
	TBD		TBD; TBD; TBD	Stadium: Estadio Flor Blanco

August 4, 1968 Friendly	Atletico Marte	0-4	Portuguesa de Desportos	San Salvador, El Salvador
	Nil		TBD; TBD; TBD	Stadium: Estadio Flor Blanco

April 2, 1970 Friendly	Atletico Marte	5-2	Universidad Católica	San Salvador, El Salvador
	Will Rodriguez; Hugo Luis Lencina; Sigfrido Espinoza; Sergio de Jesus; Elenilson Franco		Juan Carlos Sarnari; TBD	Stadium: Estadio Flor Blanco

April 2, 1970 Friendly	Atletico Marte	2-0	Panama	San Salvador, El Salvador
	Juan Rios 11'; Elenilson Franco 39'			Stadium: Estadio Flor Blanco

March 19, 1971 Friendly	Atletico Marte	1-1	Santos FC	Panama City, Panama
	Elenilson Franco		Piccoli	Stadium: Estadio Revolución

22 April, 1971 Friendly	Atletico Marte	0-3	Central Español	San Salvador, El Salvador
	Nil		Antonio Veloso; Gerardo Rodríguez; Hernandez	Stadium: Estadio Flor Blanco

Friendly	Atletico Marte	0-1	Dukla Prague	San Salvador, El Salvador
	Nil		Rodolfo Baello Own goal (o.g.)	Stadium: Estadio Flor Blanco

April 25, 1973 Friendly	Atletico Marte	2-2	Miami Toros	San Salvador, El Salvador
	Helio Rodriguez; Jose Luis Rugamas		Warren Archibald; Eaton	Stadium: Estadio Revolución

== Individual awards ==
=== Award winners ===
Top Goalscorer (5)

The following players have won the Goalscorer while playing for Marte:

- (El Salvador) Sergio Méndez (27) -1974-75
- (El Salvador) Wilfredo Huezo (13) – 1981
- (El Salvador) Jose "Mandingo" Rivas (11) – 1985
- (Brazil) Rodinei Martins (24) – 1992-93
- (Argentina) Gonzalo Mazzia (13) – Apertura 2013

== Goalscorers ==
- Most goals scored : **TBD** - TBD
- Most League goals: **TBD** -
- Most League goals in a season: **TBD** - TBD, Primera Division, TBD
- Most goals scored by a Marte player in a match: **TBD** - TBD v. TBD (Marte 7-2 UES), Day Month Year
- Most goals scored by a Marte player in an International match: **TBD** - TBD v. TBD, Day Month Year
- Most goals scored in CONCACAF competition: **TBD** - tbd, tbd

=== All-time top goalscorers ===
No.	Player	period	Goals
1	(El Salvador) Sergio Méndez † (1943-1976)	1971-1976	146 (68)
2	(El Salvador) Miguel Gonzalez Barillas	1975-1982	87
3	(El Salvador) Norberto Huezo	1976–1977, 1978–1982, 1985–1986	74
4	(El Salvador) Wilfredo Huezo	1980-1990	70
5	(El Salvador) Fernando Barrios	1954-57	69
6	(El Salvador) Mauricio González † (1942-2018)	1959–1968	58
7	(El Salvador) Rene Toledo	1990-2000	53
8	(El Salvador) Alfredo Ruano	1955-57	45
9	(El Salvador) José Luis Rugamas	1974-1982	42
10	(Sierra Leone) Abdul Thompson Conteh	1994–1995	39
11	(Brazil) Elenilson Franco	1970-1974	38
11	(Uruguay) José Mario Figueroa Viscarret	1984-1985, 1990-1991	38

Note: Players in bold text are still active with Atletico Marte.

=== All-time top goalscorers (Clausura/Apertura) ===
No.	Player	period	Goals
1	(El Salvador) Christopher Ramirez	2011-2015	31
2	(El Salvador) (Argentina) Emiliano Pedrozo	2000-2002, 2009	22
3	(Uruguay) Alcides Bandera	Year	21
4	(El Salvador) Luis Canales	2017-2019	18
5	(Argentina) Gonzalo Mazzia	2012-2013	17
6	(El Salvador) Cesar Larios	2012-2013	14
7	(El Salvador) Gilberto Baires	Year	14
8	(Colombia) Cristian Gil Mosquera	Year	10
9	(El Salvador) Erick Molina	Year	10
10	(El Salvador) TBD	Year	Goals

Note: Players in bold text are still active with Atletico Marte.

==== Historical goals ====
Goal	Name	Date	Match
1st goal	(El Salvador) TBD	Day Month Year	Marte 1 – Libertad 4
1st in Primera Division	(El Salvador) TBD	Day Month Year	Marte 2 – Juventud Olímpica 1
100th	(El Salvador) TBD	Day Month Year	Marte 7 – Olympic 3
500th	(El Salvador) TBD	Day Month Year	Marte 4 – Dragon 0
1000th	(El Salvador) TBD	Day Month Year	Marte 1 – FAS 1
1500th	(El Salvador) TBD	Day Month Year	Marte 1 – FAS 2
2000th	(El Salvador) TBD	Day Month Year	Marte 1 – FAS 1
2500th	(El Salvador) TBD	Day Month Year	Marte 3 – Dragon 0
3000th	(El Salvador) TBD	Day Month Year	Marte 2 – Vista Hermosa 1

== Players ==
=== Appearances ===
Competitive, professional matches only including substitution, number of appearances as a substitute appears in brackets.

Last updated -

	Name	Years	Primera División	Finals	CCL	Total
1	(El Salvador) -	-	(-)	(-)	(-)	(-)
2	(El Salvador) -	-	(-)	(-)	(-)	(-)
3	(El Salvador) -	-	(-)	(-)	(-)	(-)
4	(El Salvador) -	-	(-)	(-)	(-)	(-)
5	(El Salvador) -	-	(-)	(-)	(-)	(-)
6	(El Salvador) -	-	(-)	(-)	(-)	(-)
7	(El Salvador) -	-	(-)	(-)	(-)	(-)
8	(El Salvador) -	-	(-)	(-)	(-)	(-)
9	(El Salvador) -	-	(-)	(-)	(-)	(-)
10	(El Salvador) -	-	(-)	(-)	(-)	(-)

==== Other appearances records ====
- Youngest first-team player: 17 years, 114 days – (El Salvador) TBD v TBD, Primera Division, Day Month Year
- Oldest post-Second World War player: 38 years, 233 days – (El Salvador) TBD v TBD, Primera Division, Day Month Year
- Most appearances in Primera Division: TBD – (El Salvador) TBD
- Most appearances in Copa Presidente: TBD – (El Salvador) TBD
- Most appearances in International competitions: TBD – (El Salvador) TBD
- Most appearances in CONCACAF competitions: TBD – (El Salvador) TBD
- Most appearances in UNCAF competitions: TBD – (El Salvador) TBD
- Most appearances in CONCACAF Champions League: TBD – (El Salvador) TBD
- Most appearances in UNCAF Copa: TBD (El Salvador) TBD
- Most appearances in FIFA Club World Cup: 2

- (Brazil) Zózimo

- Most appearances as a foreign player in all competitions: TBD – (Brazil) TBD
- Most appearances as a foreign player in Primera Division: TBD – (Brazil) TBD
- Most consecutive League appearances: TBD – (El Salvador) TBD – from Month Day, Year at Month Day, Year
- Shortest appearance: –

== Records ==
=== Scorelines ===
- Record League victory: 8-1 v Aguila, Primera division, 5 December 1993
- Record League Defeat: TBD-TBD v TBD, Primera division, Day Month Year
- Record Cup victory: TBD–TBD v TBD, Presidente Cup, TBD
- Record CONCACAF Championship Victory: TBD–TBD v TBD, TBD, TBD
- Record CONCACAF Championship defeat: TBD–TBD v TBD, TBD, TBD
- Record UNCAF Victory: 5–1 v Coban Imperial, TBD, 1979
- Record UNCAF defeat: 1–5 v C.S. Herediano, 1972

=== Sequences ===
- Most wins in a row: TBD, TBD - TBD
- Most home wins in a row (all competitions): TBD, TBD– TBD
- Most home league wins in a row: TBD, TBD - TBD
- Most away wins in a row: TBD, TBD – TBD
- Most draws in a row: TBD, TBD
- Most home draws in a row: TBD, TBD
- Most away draws in a row: TBD, TBD
- Most defeats in a row: 8, TBD
- Most home defeats in a row: TBD, TBD
- Most away defeats in a row: TBD, TBD
- Longest unbeaten run: 20, 1985 Season
- Longest unbeaten run at home: TBD, TBD
- Longest unbeaten run away: TBD, TBD
- Longest winless run: TBD, TBD – TBD
- Longest winless run at home: TBD, TBD – TBD
- Longest winless run away: TBD, TBD - TBD

=== Seasonal ===
- Most goals in all competitions in a season: TBD - TBD
- Most League goals in a season: TBD - TBD
- Fewest league goals conceded in a season: 6 - 1981
- Most points in a season (): TBD - TBD, TBD
- Most points in a season (Apertura/Clausura): 35 points - Apertura 2013, 9 wins, 8 draw and 1 loss
- Most League wins in a season (): TBD – TBD
- Most League wins in a season (Apertura/Clausura): 9 wins – Apertura 2013
- Most home League wins in a season: TBD – TBD
- Most away League wins in a season: TBD – TBD

=== Internationals ===
- Most international caps (total while at club): TBD - TBD - El Salvador

=== Attendances ===
- Highest home attendance: TBD, TBD
- Highest away attendance: TBD v TBD, TBD, TBD, TBD

=== Other ===
- Seasons appearance: 69, (1950-2002, 2009–present)
- First coach that won three championships in a row in El Salvador: Salvadoran Conrado Miranda with Atletico Marte in 1955-57.
- Most points in a season: points, Atletico Marte (TBD)
- First Foreign Player to be signed by Atletico Marte: Costa Rican Ernesto Mora Varga, 1950-1951
- Fastest goalscorer:

== Internationals ==
The following players represented their countries while playing for Atletico Marte (the figure in brackets is the number of caps gained while a Marte player. Many of these players also gained caps while at other clubs.) Figures for active players (in bold) last updated 2014

Chile

- José Moris

Costa Rica

- José Luis Soto (1965)

El Salvador

- Ovidio López
- Yohalmo Aurora
- Manuel Garay
- Carlos Guerra
- Albert Fay
- Raúl Magaña
- Carlos Felipe Cañadas
- Carlos Antonio Meléndez
- Luis Guevara Mora
- Mauricio Alvarenga
- Ramon Fagoaga
- Norberto Huezo
- Luis Regalado
- Conrado Miranda
- Arturo Albarran
- Celio Rodríguez

Equatorial Guinea

- Deogracias Abaga Edu Mangue

Guatemala

- Gabriel Urriola

Panama

- Luis Ernesto Tapia

Paraguay

- Jorge Lino Romero

Mexico

- Manuel Camacho

Peru

- Agustín Castillo
- Fidel Suárez

Sierra Leone

- Abdul Thompson Conteh

Uruguay

- Raúl Esnal
- Alejandro Larrea
