= List of C.D. Atlético Marte coaches =

Atletico Marte is a professional football club based in San Salvador, El Salvador. The club was formed in 1950 as Alacranes F.C., and played their first competitive match in October 1950. The club was renamed Atletico Marte in 1951,

From the beginning of the club's official managerial records in 1950 to the start of the 2021–22 season, Atletico Marte have had TBD full-time managers. The current manager is Salvadoran Omar Sevilla, who took over from Argentinian Osvaldo Escudero in March 2023.

The longest-serving manager is TBD, his managerial reign lasted between .

The most successful person to manage Atletico Marte is Conrado Miranda and Armando Contreras Palma, who won 3 Primera division titles.

== Managers ==
- Only first-team competitive matches are counted.
- Statistics are updated up to 19 August 2022.

Table key

- Player-coach (team player that assumed simultaneously the role of coach)
- Caretaker coach (coach who assumed temporarily the job in the absence of the incumbent head coach or until a new head coach was hired)

List of Head Coaches of Atlético Marte from when the club was formed:

Name	From	To	Honours
(El Salvador) Emilio Guardado	1950	1952	
(El Salvador) Conrado Miranda	1955	1957	3 Primera División (1955, 1956, 1957)
(El Salvador) Isaías Choto	1960	1961	
(Argentina) (Italy) José Santacolomba	1961	1964	
(El Salvador) Isaías Choto	1964	1965	
(Argentina) Juan Colecchio	1967	1967	
(Chile) Hernán Carrasco Vivanco	1968	1970	2 Primera División (1969, 1970)
(El Salvador) Isaías Choto	1972	December 1972	
(Chile) Hernán Carrasco Vivanco	January 1973	1973	
(El Salvador) Isaías Choto	February 1974	December 1974	
(Chile) Julio Marcos Baldovino	January 1975	October 1975	
(Chile) Ricardo Sepúlveda	November 1975	December 1975	
(Argentina) Juan Quarterone	December 1975	1978	
(Argentina) Gregorio Bundio	1978	1979	
(El Salvador) Armando Contreras Palma	1981	1982, 1985	3 Primera División (1980–81, 1982, 1985)
(Uruguay) Carlos Jurado	1986	1987	
(El Salvador) Jorge Rajo	1988	1989	
(Argentina) Hugo Luis Lencinas	1989	1989	
(El Salvador) Armando Contreras Palma	1991	December 1991	1 Copa El Salvador
(Uruguay) Carlos Jurado	December 1991	January 1992	1 Recopa de la UNCAF
(El Salvador) Juan Ramón Paredes	January 1992	1992	1 CONCACAF Cup Winners Cup
(El Salvador) Guillermo Antonio Castro	1992	1992	
(El Salvador) Oscar Emigdio Benítez	1993	1993	
(El Salvador) Cristo Arnoldo Velásquez Farfán	1994	1994	
(Uruguay) Juan Masnik	1994	January 1995	
(El Salvador) Ricardo Lopez Tenorio	1995	1995	
(Brazil) Helio Rodriguez	1995	September 1995	
(Uruguay) Juan Lopez	October 1995	October 1995	
(Mexico) Reno Renucci Badiali	October 1995	July 1996	
(Mexico) Javier Fragoso	August 1996	October 1996	
(El Salvador) José Luis Rugamas	October 1996	November 1996	
(Argentina) Juan Quarterone	November 1996	November 1997	
(El Salvador) Armando Contreras Palma	November 1997	March 1999	
(Uruguay) Carlos Jurado	1997	1997	
(Costa Rica) Didier Zorro Castro	1997	1997	
(El Salvador) José Luis Siu	1998	1998	
(El Salvador) Luis Landos	1998	1998	
(Mexico) Reno Renucci Badiali	1998	1998	
(El Salvador) José Luis Rugamas	March 1999	September 1999	
(El Salvador) Juan Ramón Paredes	September 1999	August 2000	
(El Salvador) Mauricio "Pachín" González	August 2000	December 2000	
(El Salvador) Juan Ramón Paredes	January 2001	July 2001	
(Mexico) Jorge Martinez	July 2001	September 2001	
(Paraguay) Nelson Brizuela	September 2001	October 2001	
(El Salvador) Luis Ángel León	October 2001	February 2002	
(Chile) Hernán Carrasco Vivanco	March 2002	April 2002	
(El Salvador) Oscar Emigdio Benítez	January 2003	2003	
(El Salvador) Ramón Avilés	August 2003	2003	
(Chile) Juan Carlos Carreño	January 2004	June 2004	
(El Salvador) Raul Magana	July 2004	June 2008	
(Argentina) Ramiro Cepeda	July 2008	September 2010	2008 Apertura Segunda division; 1 Promotion Play-off Winners 2008–2009
(El Salvador) Luis Guevara Mora	September 2010	October 2010	
(El Salvador) Juan Ramón Paredes	October 2010	September 2011	
(El Salvador) Ángel Orellana	September 2011	September 2011	
(El Salvador) Fausto Omar Vásquez	September 2011	January 2012	
(Argentina) Jorge Alberto García	January 2012	May 2013	
(El Salvador) Guillermo Rivera	May 2013	December 2014	
(Argentina) Jorge Alberto García	January 2015 -	February 2015	
(El Salvador) Gabriel Álvarez (Interim - 1 game)	February 2015	February 2015	
(Argentina) Daniel Fernández	February 2015	May 2015	
(El Salvador) Carlos 'Cacho' Melendez	June 2015	September 2015	
(El Salvador) Douglas Vidal Jiménez	September 2015	February 2016	
(Argentina) Juan Andrés Sarulyte	February 2016	March 2016	
(El Salvador) Efrain Burgos	March 2016	June 2016	
(Chile) Juan Carlos Carreño	July 2016	November 2016	
(El Salvador) Luis Guevara Mora	December 2016	February 2017	
(Argentina) Gabriel Álvarez	March 2017	October 2018	
(El Salvador) Ricardo Garcia	October 2018	June 2019	
(El Salvador) Mauricio Alfaro	June 2019	September 2019	
(El Salvador) Jorge Calles	October 2019	October 2019	
(Chile) Juan Carlos Carreno	October 2019	May 2020	
(Argentina) Cristian Domizi	May 2020	May 2021	
(El Salvador) Nelson Mauricio Ancheta	June 2021	June 2022	
(Argentina) Osvaldo Escudero	June 2022	March 2023	
(El Salvador) Omar Sevilla	March 2023	June 2023	
(El Salvador) Juarez	July 2023	September 2023	
(El Salvador) Edson Flores	October 2023	Present	

== By number of trophies ==
Only managers who have won at least one trophy are mentioned.

Name	Period	Trophies				
Name	Period	Domestic			International	
Name	Period	PD	SD	Other cups	CONCACAF Cup Winners Cup	UNCAF Cup Winners cup
(Chile) Hernán Carrasco Vivanco	1969, 1970	2	0	0	0	0
(El Salvador) Armando Contreras Palma	1980–1981,1982, 1985	3	0	1	0	0
(El Salvador) Emilio Guardado	????, ????	0	0	2	0	0
(El Salvador) Marcelo Estrada	????	0	0	1	0	0
(El Salvador) Conrado Miranda	1955,1956,1957	3	0	0	0	0
(Argentina) Ramiro Cepeda	2008 Apertura	0	1	0	0	0
(Uruguay) Carlos Jurado	1991	0	0	0	0	1
(El Salvador) Juan Ramón Paredes	1991	0	0	0	1	0
