= 1985 Primera División de El Salvador =

35th season of Primera División de El Salvador

Primera División de El Salvador
- Season: 1985
- Champions: Atletico Marte (8th Title)
- Relegated: None

The 1985 Primera División de El Salvador was the 35th season of top-tier football in El Salvador.

At the end of the regular season, the top 4 teams took part in the final group stage. Atletico Marte, the best regular season team, won the championship match against Alianza, the best team in the final group.

== Teams ==
Team	City	Stadium	Head coach	Captain
Atletico Marte	TBD	Estadio Cuscutlan	(El Salvador) Armando Contreras Palma	(El Salvador) William Rosales
Aguila	TBD	Estadio	(El Salvador) TBD	(El Salvador)
Alianza	TBD	Estadio	(El Salvador) TBD	(El Salvador) Julio Palacios
Chalatenango	TBD	Estadio	(El Salvador) TBD	(El Salvador)
FAS	TBD	Estadio	(El Salvador) TBD	(El Salvador)
Firpo	TBD	Estadio	(El Salvador) TBD	(El Salvador)
CESSA	TBD	Estadio	(El Salvador) TBD	(El Salvador)
Once Lobos	TBD	Estadio	(El Salvador) TBD	(El Salvador)
UCA	TBD	Estadio	(El Salvador)	(El Salvador) Valenzuela Sanabria
UES	TBD	Estadio	(El Salvador) TBD	(El Salvador)

== League standings ==
Pos	Team	Pld	W	D	L	GF	GA	GD	Pts	Qualification or relegation
1	Atlético Marte	27	13	12	2	40	25	+15	38	Qualified to finals. Won the right to play a Championship Game if they fail to win the final round.
2	C.D. Águila	27	13	10	4	36	23	+13	36	Qualified to finals.
3	Alianza F.C.	27	11	9	7	36	29	+7	31	Qualified to finals.
4	C.D. Luis Ángel Firpo	27	7	15	5	34	24	+10	29	Qualified to finals.
5	CESSA	27	7	14	6	23	20	+3	28	
6	UES	27	7	9	11	18	25	−7	23	
7	C.D. Chalatenango	27	7	8	12	27	39	−12	22	
8	C.D. FAS	27	7	7	13	22	28	−6	21	
9	Once Lobos	27	4	13	10	18	26	−8	21	
10	UCA	27	5	11	11	27	42	−15	21	

Source: https://www.rsssf.org/tablese/elsalhist.html

== Final round standings ==
Pos	Team	Pld	W	D	L	GF	GA	GD	Pts	Qualification
1	Alianza F.C.	6	3	3	0	9	5	+4	9	Qualified to championship game
2	Atlético Marte	6	3	2	1	8	4	+4	8	
3	C.D. Águila	6	1	2	3	6	9	−3	4	
4	C.D. Luis Ángel Firpo	6	0	3	3	5	10	−5	3	

=== Final ===
==== First leg ====
22 December 1985
(UTC-6)

Alianza	5-3	Atletico Marte
Ruben Alonso; Ramón Maradiaga; Joaquín 'Kin' Canales; Alejandro Biegler		Norberto Huezo; José Luis Rugamas

==== Second leg ====
25 December 1985
(UTC-6)

Atletico Marte	5-2	Alianza
Salomón Campos 9'; Norberto Huezo 18'; Mario Figueroa 74' 93'; Will Huezo 112'		Joaquín 'Kin' Canales 55'; Alejandro Biegler 81'

Estadio: Cuscatlán, San Salvador
Referee: Carlos Ortiz Cardoza

Atletico Marte:
GK	1	(El Salvador) Carlos 'Cacho' Melendez
DF	4	(El Salvador) William Rosales (red card) (c)
DF	18	(Uruguay) Raul Esnal
DF	14	(El Salvador) Nelson Escobar
DF	13	(El Salvador) Mauricio Perla
MF	11	(El Salvador) Salomón Campos (red card)
MF	12	(El Salvador) Danilo Blanco
MF	24	(El Salvador) Norberto Huezo
MF	7	(El Salvador) Guillermo Lorenzana Ragazzone
FW	9	(El Salvador) Jose Maria 'Mandingo' Rivas
FW	6	(Uruguay) Mario Figueroa
Substitutes:
MF	10	(El Salvador) Will Huezo
FW	20	(El Salvador) Herbert Jaco
Manager:
(El Salvador) Armando Contreras Palma

Alianza:
GK	1	(El Salvador) William Rosales Santillana
DF	12	(El Salvador) Carlos Medrano
DF	3	(Argentina) Alejandro Biegler
DF	6	(El Salvador) Óscar Rodríguez
DF	3	(El Salvador) Carlos Merino
MF	7	(Uruguay) Antonio García Prieto
MF	23	(Honduras) Ramón Maradiaga
MF	22	(Uruguay) Carlos Reyes
FW	16	(El Salvador) Julio Palacios Lozano (c)
FW	10	(El Salvador) Joaquín 'Kin' Canales
FW	20	(Uruguay) Rubén Alonso
Substitutes:
DF	25	(El Salvador) Salvador Moreno
MF	21	(El Salvador) Juan Ramón Pacheco
Manager:
(Argentina) Juan Quarterone

== Top scorers ==
Pos	Player	Team	Goals
1.	(El Salvador) Jose Maria Rivas	Atletico Marte	11
2	(El Salvador) TBD	TBD	TBD
3.	(El Salvador) TBD	TBD	TBD
4.	(El Salvador) TBD	TBD	TBD
5.	(El Salvador) TBD	TBD	TBD
6.	(El Salvador) TBD	TBD	TBD
7.	(El Salvador) TBD	TBD	TBD
8.	(El Salvador) TBD	TBD	TBD
9.	(El Salvador) TBD	TBD	TBD
10.	(El Salvador) TBD	TBD	TBD

== List of foreign players in the league ==
This is a list of foreign players in the 1985 season. The following players:

1. have played at least one apertura game for the respective club.
2. have not been capped for the El Salvador national football team on any level, independently from the birthplace

Atletico Marte

- (Uruguay) Raul Esnal
- (Uruguay) Jose Mario Figueroa

C.D. Águila

- (Argentina) Juan Carlos Veloso
- (Brazil) Marco Antonio Pereira
- (Guatemala) Adan Onelio Paniagua

Alianza F.C.

- (Argentina) Óscar Biegler
- (Uruguay) Ruben Alonso
- (Uruguay) Carlos Reyes
- (Honduras) Ramón Maradiaga

Chalatenango

- (Argentina) Arnoldo Martinez
- (Guatemala) Barillas

(player released mid season) (player Injured mid season) Injury replacement player

C.D. FAS

- (Honduras)

C.D. Luis Ángel Firpo

- (Brazil) Salvador Filho
- (Brazil) Jorge Nunez
- (Brazil) Eraldo Correira
- (Brazil) Carlinho Lopes Neves

Metapan

- (Honduras)

Once Lobos

- (Honduras)

UCA

- (Guatemala) Bobadilla

UES

- (Honduras)
