= Huezo =

Huezo is a surname. Notable people with the surname include:

- Miguel Huezo Mixco (born 1954), Salvadoran writer and poet
- Norberto Huezo (1956–2025), Salvadoran footballer
- Tatiana Huezo (born 1972), Salvadoran film director
