= Aldave =

Aldave is a surname. Notable people with the surname include:

- Alfonso Rodríguez Aldave
- Bryan Aldave (born 1983), Uruguayan footballer
- Inaki Malumbres Aldave (born 1975), Spanish handball player
- Mauro Aldave (born 1984), Uruguayan footballer
