= Ibsen Castro =

Salvadorian footballer (born 1988)

Personal information
- Full name: Ibsen Adalberto Castro Avelar
- Date of birth: 24 October 1988 (age 38)
- Place of birth: Quezaltepeque, La Libertad, El Salvador
- Height: 1.67 m (5 ft 6 in)
- Position: Defender

Team information
- Current team: FAS
- Number: 20

Youth career
- CD Atlético Marte
- Nejapa FC
- CD Brasilia

Senior career*
Years	Team	Apps	(Gls)
2010–2014	CD Atlético Marte	80	(24)
2014–2017	CD Águila	36	(10)
2017–2018	Sonsonate FC	42	(3)
2018–	CD FAS	87	(3)

International career
2014–	El Salvador	17	(1)
- * Club domestic league appearances and goals as of 30 May 2021

Ibsen Adalberto Castro Avelar (born 24 October 1988) is a Salvadoran professional footballer who plays as a defender for Primera División club FAS.

Castro was born in Quezaltepeque, La Libertad, and played youth football with Atlético Marte before joining the first team in 2010.

== Club career ==
=== Atlético Marte ===
Castro began his youth career at the San Salvador club, Atlético Marte. He made his first team debut 2010 and amassed 72 appearances and scored 6 goals for Los Marcianos during a two-year spell.

=== Águila ===
In June 2014, Castro signed with Águila. He made his debut for Águila in a 3–0 victory against Alianza. He scored his first goal for Águila in a 1–2 defeat against Santa Tecla in the Estadio Las Delicias, in August 2014.

With Águila, Castro disputed the finals of the Apertura 2014 and the Clausura 2016, but they were defeated by Isidro Metapán (on penalties) and Dragón (0–1) respectively.

=== Sonsonate ===
Castro signed with Sonsonate for the Apertura 2017. He scored his first goal for Sonsonate in a 1–1 draw against Águila in the Estadio Cuscatlán, in July 2017.

=== FAS ===
In 2018, he signed with FAS for the Apertura 2018. He scored a crucial goal in a 1–0 victory against Sonsonate in the Estadio Óscar Quiteño in October 2018.

With FAS, he reached the semifinals of the Apertura 2018.

He won the Salvadorian tournament with CD FAS in 2021 against alianza.

== International career ==
Castro was first called up to the El Salvador national team in 2014. He was called up for the 2014 Copa Centroamericana and started the first group stage game, a 2–1 loss against Guatemala, in an eventual fourth-place finish for El Salvador.

Castro has won seven caps with El Salvador at the moment.

== Honours ==
FAS

- Salvadoran Primera División: Clausura 2021

El Salvador

- Copa Centroamericana: 2014 4th place
