= José Moris =

Chilean footballer (1939–2024)

Personal information
- Full name: José Alberto Moris
- Date of birth: 17 July 1939
- Place of birth: Santiago, Chile
- Date of death: 9 September 2024 (aged 85)
- Position: Midfielder

Senior career*
Years	Team	Apps	(Gls)
1956–1963	Universidad de Chile		
1964–1970	Palestino		
1971–1972	Santiago Morning		
1973	Colchagua		
1974	Atlético Marte		
1975	Tally Juca		

International career
1967	Chile	2	(0)
- * Club domestic league appearances and goals

José Alberto Moris (17 July 1939 – 9 September 2024) was a Chilean footballer who played as a midfielder. He made two appearances for the Chile national team in 1967. He was also part of Chile's squad for the 1967 South American Championship.

Moris died on 9 September 2024, at the age of 85.
