= Agustín Adorni =

Argentine footballer (born 1990)

Personal information
- Full name: Agustín Andrés Adorni
- Date of birth: 18 June 1990 (age 36)
- Place of birth: Rosario, Santa Fe, Argentina
- Height: 1.71 m (5 ft 7 in)
- Position: Forward

Senior career*
Years	Team	Apps	(Gls)
2007–2009	Central Córdoba de Rosario	32	(1)
2010	Juventud Pergamino	5	(0)
2010–2013	Sarmiento de Resistencia	53	(4)
2013–2014	Unión De Casilda		
2014	Pasaquina FC	13	(1)
2015	Atlético Marte		
2015	América General Pirán		
- * Club domestic league appearances and goals

Agustín Andrés Adorni (born 18 June 1990) is an Argentine former footballer who played as a forward.

== Career ==
Born in Rosario, Santa Fe, Adorni is the product of Provincial, Newell's Old Boys and Central Córdoba's youth systems, and he made his professional debut in the Primera B Metropolitana with Central Córdoba at age 17. After the club was relegated, he had spells in the lower leagues with Juventud de Pergamino and Sarmiento de Resistencia.
