= Isaías Choto =

Salvadoran footballer and manager

Personal information
- Full name: Isaías Salvador Choto
- Date of birth: 16 December 1921
- Place of birth: Santa Ana, El Salvador
- Date of death: 21 December 1989 (aged 68)
- Place of death: San Salvador, El Salvador
- Position: Defender

Senior career*
Years	Team	Apps	(Gls)
1947-1948	LA Firpo		
1948-1949	Libertad F.C.		
1950-1955	Atletico Marte		

International career
1948–1951	El Salvador		

Managerial career
- 1953-1955: Atletico Marte (assistant/player)
- 1961-1965: Atletico Marte
- 1968-1970: El Salvador (assistant)
- 1970s: C.D. Chalatenango
- 1974–1975: Atletico Marte
- Aguila
- * Club domestic league appearances and goals

Isaías Salvador Choto (16 December 1921 - 21 December 1989) also known as Milo was a former Salvadoran footballer and coach.
