= Albert Fay (footballer) =

Salvadoran footballer (born 1949)

Personal information
- Full name: Albert Fay Dessent
- Date of birth: 28 January 1949 (age 77)
- Place of birth: Montevideo, Uruguay
- Height: 1.83 m (6 ft 0 in)
- Position: Goalkeeper

Youth career
- 1967–1969: Peñarol B

Senior career*
Years	Team	Apps	(Gls)
1967–1968	Peñarol		
1969	Aurora. Guatemala		
1970–1972	Alianza		
1972–1974	Águila		
1974–1976	Platense		
1977	Peñarol		
1978	Juventud Olímpica		
1978–1984	Atlético Marte		

International career
1977	El Salvador		(0)
- * Club domestic league appearances and goals

Albert Fay Dessent (born 28 January 1949) is a retired footballer who played as a goalkeeper for several clubs in the Primera División de Fútbol de El Salvador. Born in Uruguay, he played for the El Salvador national team.
