= Guillermo Castro (Salvadoran footballer) =

Salvadoran footballer (born 1940)

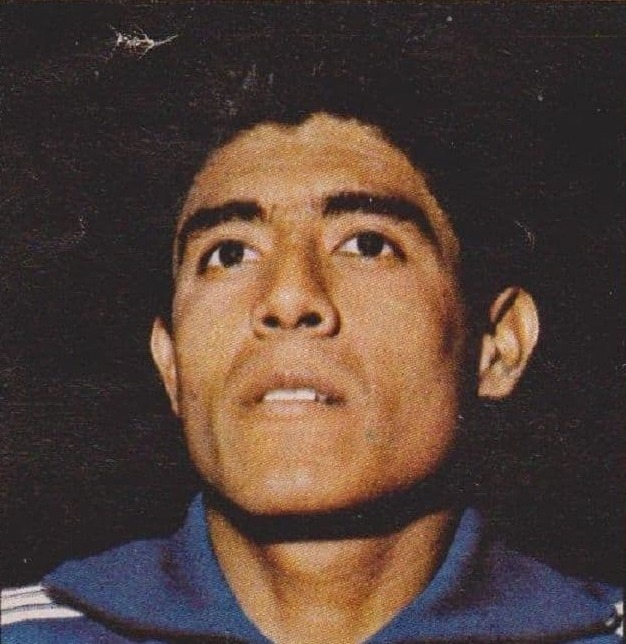
- Castro in 1970

Personal information
- Full name: Guillermo Antonio Castro Orellana
- Date of birth: 25 June 1940 (age 86)
- Place of birth: San Salvador, El Salvador
- Position: Defender

Senior career*
Years	Team	Apps	(Gls)
1960–1970	Atlético Marte		
1971–1972	UES		
1973–1976	Atlético Marte		
1977	Juventud Independiente		

International career
	El Salvador	36	(0)

Managerial career
- 1978–1980: Independiente de San Vicente
- 1981–1982: Chalatenango
- 1992: Atlético Marte
- * Club domestic league appearances and goals as of 2009

Guillermo Antonio Castro Orellana (born 25 June 1940 in San Salvador) is a retired footballer from El Salvador.

== Club career ==
Nicknamed el Loro (the Parrot), he has most notably played for local side Atlético Marte, with whom he made his debut in 1960. He has also had spells at UES and Juventud Independiente.

== International career ==
Castro represented his country at the 1968 Summer Olympics, in five FIFA World Cup qualification matches and at the 1970 FIFA World Cup in Mexico.

== Retirement ==
He has been involved with El Salvador's coaches association for 30 years and has also managed league sides Independiente de San Vicente, Chalatenango and Atlético Marte.
