= Santiago Cortés (footballer) =

Salvadoran footballer (1945-2011)

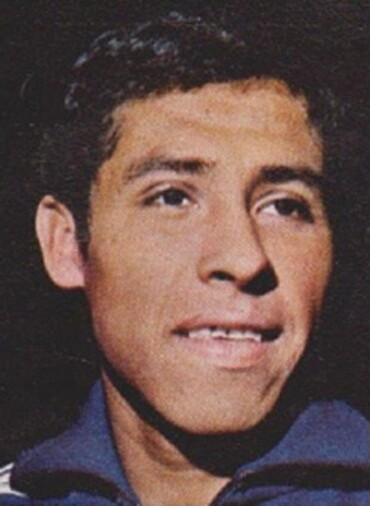
- Cortés in 1970

Personal information
- Full name: Santiago Cortés Méndez
- Date of birth: January 19, 1945
- Place of birth: San Salvador, El Salvador
- Date of death: 25 July 2011 (aged 66)
- Place of death: Los Angeles, U.S.
- Position: Defender

Senior career*
Years	Team	Apps	(Gls)
1962–1973	Atlético Marte		

International career
	El Salvador	14	(0)
- * Club domestic league appearances and goals as of 2009

Santiago Cortés Méndez (19 January 1945 – 25 July 2011) was a footballer from El Salvador.

== International career ==
Cortés represented his country at the 1970 FIFA World Cup in Mexico.

== Death ==
Santiago Cortes Mendez, who figured as a midfielder for the national team of El Salvador that participated in the 1970 World Cup in Mexico, died on Monday, 25 July 2011, in Los Angeles at age 66, after suffering in recent months from brain cancer.
