= Alejandro Larrea =

Uruguayan football player and manager (1966–2026)

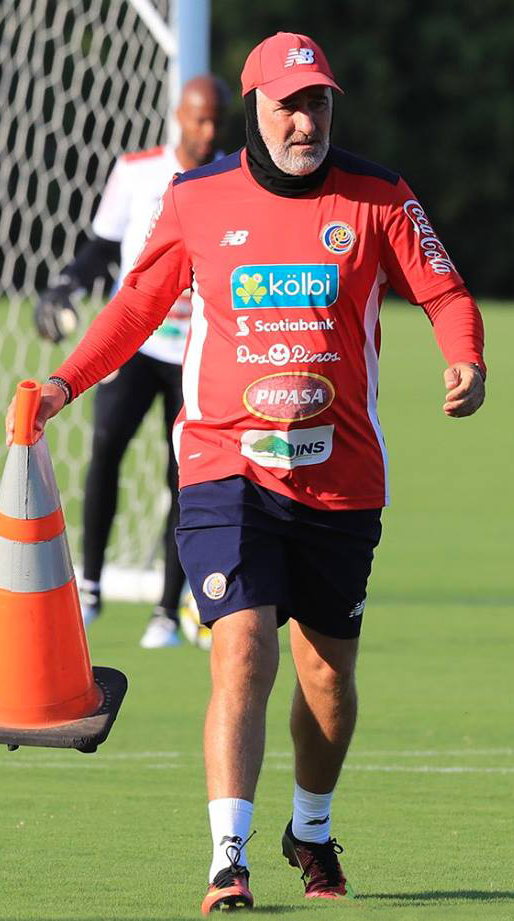
- Larrea as Costa Rica manager in 2017

Personal information
- Full name: Alejandro Javier Larrea Marzol
- Date of birth: 5 December 1966
- Place of birth: Montevideo, Uruguay
- Date of death: 22 August 2026 (aged 59)
- Height: 1.77 m (5 ft 10 in)
- Position: Forward

Senior career*
Years	Team	Apps	(Gls)
1983–1988	Montevideo Wanderers		
1988–1990	Progreso		
1990–1991	Sud América		
1992	Central Español		
1992–1994	Estudiantes	35	(4)
1995–1997	Atlético Marte		
1997	Aurora		
1997–1999	Deportivo Saprissa		
1999	Beijing Guoan	11	(1)
2000–2001	Montevideo Wanderers		
2001	Guangzhou Geely	9	(1)
2001	Tianjin Teda	0	(0)
2001–2002	Montevideo Wanderers		
2003–2004	Ramonense		

International career
1992	Uruguay	2	(1)

Managerial career
- 2005–2006: Deportivo Saprissa (assistant)
- 2006: Santacruceña
- 2007: Turrialba
- 2007: Guanacasteca
- 2007–2008: Puntarenas
- 2008: Guanacasteca
- 2014: Hebei Zhongji (assistant)
- 2014: Hebei Zhongji (caretaker)
- 2015–2018: Costa Rica (assistant)
- 2019: Puerto Golfito
- 2020–2021: Sacachispas
- 2022: Parque del Plata
- 2024–2025: Progreso (youth)
- 2025: Progreso (interim)
- 2025: Progreso
- * Club domestic league appearances and goals

Alejandro Javier Larrea Marzol (5 December 1966 – 22 August 2026) was a Uruguayan professional football manager and player who played as a forward.

== Career ==
Larrea earned two caps for Uruguay national team in 1992. On 21 June 1992, he made his debut and scored his first goal in a 2–0 win over Australia. He played another match on 4 July 1992 in a 3–1 win over Ecuador.

In July 1999, Larrea transferred to Chinese Jia-A League side Beijing Guoan. On 25 July 1999, he scored his first goal in China in a 3–3 away draw against Shenyang Haishi. He joined Chinese second-tier club Guangzhou Geely in April 2001. On 5 May, he made his debut for Guangzhou and scored his first goal in a 1–1 away draw against Jiangsu Sainty. Larrea joined another Jia-A League club Tianjin Teda, which was then coached by Uruguayan manager Nelson Agresta, on 28 July 2001. He left the club in August, playing just two FA Cup matches for Tianjin in the two legs of the third round of 2001 Chinese FA Cup.

On 23 December 2013, Larrea was appointed the assistant coach of Nelson Agresta for China League One club Hebei Zhongji. He became the caretaker manager of the club for the rest of the season on 11 August 2014 after Agresta was sacked.

On 24 August 2015, Larrea was hired to serve as Óscar Ramírez's assistant in the Costa Rica national football team.

== Death ==
Larrea died on 22 August 2026, at the age of 59.
