= 1991 CONCACAF Cup Winners Cup =

Tournament details
- Dates: 9 November 1991 – 19 January 1992
- Teams: 9 (from 9 federations)

Final positions
- Champions: (El Salvador) Marte (1st title)
- Runners-up: (Guatemala) Comunicaciones
- Third place: (Mexico) Universidad de Guadalajara

Tournament statistics
- Matches played: 18
- Goals scored: 67 (3.72 per match)

The 1991 CONCACAF Cup Winners Cup was the first edition of this defunct tournament contended between 1991 and 1998.

== Preliminary round ==
=== North zone ===
10 November 1991
2pm

Brooklyn Italians (United States)	0 - 3	(Mexico) Universidad de Guadalajara
		Hugo Aparecido 11'; Alberto Mariscal 38'; Leopoldo Castagneda 86'

Memorial Field, Mount Vernon, N.Y.
Attendance: 2,500
Referee: Rex Osborne (Bermuda)

20 November 1991

Universidad de Guadalajara (Mexico)	3 - 1	(United States) Brooklyn Italians
Eduardo Chagas 14'; Manguinha 25'; Octavio Mora 73'		Danny Mueller 53'

Estadio Club La Primera, Guadalajara
Referee: Robert Sawtell (Canada)

Universidad de Guadalajara qualified for Final Round.

=== Caribbean zone ===
==== First round ====
29 October 1991

Javouhey Mana (French Guiana)	0 - 1	(Haiti) Racing Gonaïves

11 November 1991

Racing Gonaïves (Haiti)	3 - 0	(French Guiana) Javouhey Mana

Racing Gonaïves qualified for Next Round.

==== Second round ====
3 December 1991

Gauloise (Guadeloupe)	2 - 2	(Haiti) Racing Gonaïves

17 December 1991

Racing Gonaïves (Haiti)	3 - 1	(Guadeloupe) Gauloise

Racing Gonaïves qualified for Final Round

=== Central zone ===
1991-12-08

Comunicaciones (Guatemala)	1 - 1	(El Salvador) Atlético Marte
Marcelo Bauza 8'		Oscar Arbizu 73'

Estadio Doroteo Guamuch Flores, Guatemala City
1991-12-08

Real Estelí (Nicaragua)	1 - 8	(Costa Rica) Saprissa

Estadio Doroteo Guamuch Flores, Guatemala City

1991-12-11

Comunicaciones (Guatemala)	15 - 0	(Nicaragua) Real Estelí

Estadio Doroteo Guamuch Flores, Guatemala City
1991-12-11

Atlético Marte (El Salvador)	1 - 0	(Costa Rica) Saprissa
Jose L. Cardozo 82'

Estadio Doroteo Guamuch Flores, Guatemala City

1991-12-15

Atlético Marte (El Salvador)	3 - 0	(Nicaragua) Real Estelí
Oscar Arbizu 4' 59'; Rene Toledo 40'

Estadio Doroteo Guamuch Flores, Guatemala City
1991-12-15

Comunicaciones (Guatemala)	3 - 3	(Costa Rica) Saprissa

Estadio Doroteo Guamuch Flores, Guatemala City

==== Standings ====
Pos	Team	Pld	W	D	L	GF	GA	GD	Pts	Qualification
1	(El Salvador) Atlético Marte	3	2	1	0	5	1	+4	5	Qualified to the Final Round
2	(Guatemala) Comunicaciones	3	1	2	0	19	4	+15	4	Qualified to the Final Round
3	(Costa Rica) Saprissa	3	1	1	1	11	5	+6	3	
4	(Nicaragua) Real Estelí	3	0	0	3	1	26	−25	0	

== Final round ==
1992-01-15

Comunicaciones (Guatemala)	1 - 1	(Haiti) Racing Gonaïves

Estadio Doroteo Guamuch Flores, Guatemala City
1992-01-15

Atlético Marte (El Salvador)	1 - 0	(Mexico) Universidad de Guadalajara
Efrain Alas 42'

Estadio Doroteo Guamuch Flores, Guatemala City

1992-01-17

Comunicaciones (Guatemala)	0 - 0	(Mexico) Universidad de Guadalajara

Estadio Doroteo Guamuch Flores, Guatemala City
1992-01-17

Atlético Marte (El Salvador)	4 - 1	(Haiti) Racing Gonaïves
Agustin Castillo; Efrain Alas; Oscar Arbizu		Daniel Daclinat

Estadio Doroteo Guamuch Flores, Guatemala City

1992-01-19

Comunicaciones (Guatemala)	1 - 0	(El Salvador) Atlético Marte
Edgar Arriaza 40'

Estadio Doroteo Guamuch Flores, Guatemala City
1992-01-19

Racing Gonaïves (Haiti)	1 - 2	(Mexico) Universidad de Guadalajara

Estadio Doroteo Guamuch Flores, Guatemala City

=== Standings ===
Pos	Team	Pld	W	D	L	GF	GA	GD	Pts	Qualification
1	(El Salvador) Atlético Marte	3	2	0	1	5	2	+3	4	Champion
2	(Guatemala) Comunicaciones	3	1	2	0	2	1	+1	4	
3	(Mexico) U. de G.	3	1	1	1	2	2	0	3	
4	(Haiti) Racing Gonaïves	3	0	1	2	3	7	−4	1	

== Champion ==
CONCACAF Cup Winners' Cup
1991 Winners
(El Salvador)
Atlético Marte
First title
