= José Luis Soto =

Costa Rican footballer (1932-2006)

Personal information
- Full name: José Luis Soto Quirós
- Date of birth: September 13, 1932
- Place of birth: Alajuela, Costa Rica
- Date of death: February 11, 2006 (aged 73)
- Position: Forward

Youth career
- 1947–1949: Mosquito del Saprissa

Senior career*
Years	Team	Apps	(Gls)
1950–1951	Moravia		
1952–1953	Saprissa		
1954–1956	Irapuato		
1956–1958	Saprissa		
1958	Alajuelense		
1962–1963	FAS		
1965	Atlético Marte		
- Escuintla
- Suchitepéquez
- Español de Venezuela
- Emelec
- Cartaginés
- Tibas

International career
- Costa Rica

Managerial career
- Cartaginés
- Puriscal
- Pérez Zeledón
- Sagrada Familia
- Golfito
- Santos de Guápiles
- Orión
- Unión Deportiva Tibaseña
- * Club domestic league appearances and goals

José Luis Soto Quirós (13 September 1932 – 11 February 2006) was a Costa Rican football player, who played as a striker.

== Club career ==
Born in Alajuela, Soto played club football in Costa Rica, Mexico, El Salvador, Guatemala, Venezuela and Ecuador. He made his debut with Moravia in 1950.

Soto signed with Mexican Primera División side Deportivo Irapuato in 1954.

In 1958 he became Costa Rica Primera Division top goalscorer and was honoured athlete of the year. He won two league titles with Saprissa (1952 & 1953) and one with Alajuelense (1958).

== International career ==
Nicknamed Saningo, Soto represented his country in 4 FIFA World Cup qualification matches.

== Managerial career ==
After he retired from playing, Soto became a football coach. He managed Cartaginés, Puriscal, Pérez Zeledón, Sagrada Familia, Golfito, Santos de Guápiles and Orión.

He died, aged 73, in February 2006. He was survived by his wife and four children.
