= Alberto Villalta =

Salvadoran footballer (1947–2017)

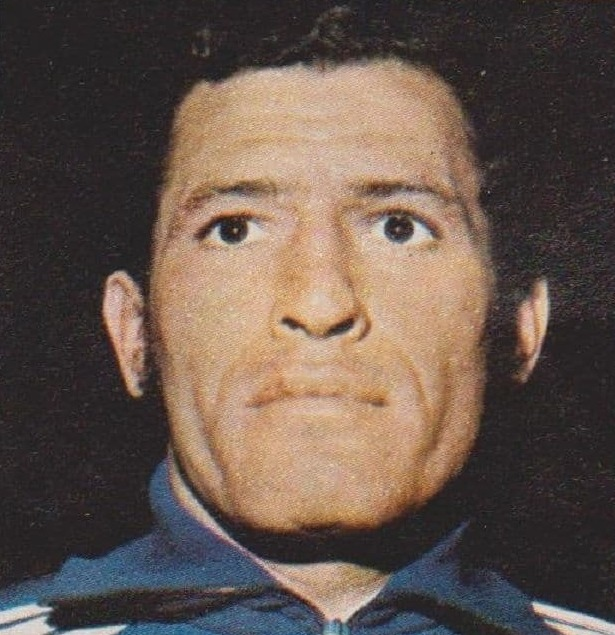
- Villalta in 1970

Personal information
- Full name: Mauricio Alberto Villalta Ávila
- Date of birth: 19 November 1947
- Place of birth: San Salvador, El Salvador
- Date of death: 4 March 2017 (aged 69)
- Place of death: San Salvador, El Salvador
- Position: Defender

Senior career*
Years	Team	Apps	(Gls)
1965–1967	Alianza		
1968–1970	Atlético Marte		
1971–?	FAS		

International career
1970	El Salvador	16	(0)
- * Club domestic league appearances and goals

Mauricio Alberto Villalta Ávila (19 November 1947 – 4 March 2017) was a Salvadoran footballer.

== Club career ==
Villalta played for Alianza, with whom he won their first league title in 1966, Atlético Marte and FAS.

He also won the CONCACAF Champions Cup in 1967.

== International career ==
He represented his country at the 1970 FIFA World Cup in Mexico and at the 1968 Summer Olympics also in Mexico.
