= Cristian Esnal =

Salvadoran footballer (born 1986)

Personal information
- Full name: Cristian Eduardo Esnal Fernández
- Date of birth: May 2, 1986 (age 40)
- Place of birth: San Salvador, El Salvador
- Height: 1.85 m (6 ft 1 in)
- Position: Defender

Youth career
- 1997–2004: Rentistas

Senior career*
| Years | Team | Apps | (Gls) |
| 2004 | Rentistas | | |
| 2004—2007 | Chalatenago | 16 | (1) |
| 2007—2008 | Águila | 13 | (0) |
| 2008—2009 | Atlético Balboa | 13 | (2) |
| 2009—2010 | Dragón | 2 | (1) |
| 2010 | Montevideo Wanderers | 5 | (0) |
| 2011—2013 | Juventud Independiente | 68 | (9) |
| 2013 | UES | 11 | (1) |
| 2014–2015 | River Plate | 3 | (0) |

International career^{‡}
| 2006 | El Salvador U-21 | | (1) |
| 2007 | El Salvador U-23 | 2 | (0) |
| 2011 | El Salvador | 1 | (0) |
- * Club domestic league appearances and goals as of April 23, 2011 ‡ National team caps and goals as of August 7, 2011

Cristian Eduardo Esnal Fernández (born May 2, 1986) is a Salvadoran footballer of Uruguayan descent, who last played professionally for Club Atlético River Plate (Uruguay). Esnal is the son of assassinated Uruguayan footballer Raúl Esnal and Cousin of Alexis Rolín.

== Career ==
He began his career playing for C.D. Chalatenango. After that season he caught the attention of C.D. Águila. He participated in the 2007 pre-Olympic qualifiers but failed to see any playing time. In October 2009, Esnal left Águila to join second division side Dragón.

On July 27, 2010, Esnal signed to Uruguayan first division club Montevideo Wanderers.

He was called up by Ruben Israel for the El Salvador friendly against Venezuela. On August 7, 2011, Esnal started the match but was subbed-out at the 67th minute for a more offensive technique.

Cristian abruptly canceled his contract with UES and left El Salvador in 2013 and moved to his father's birth country of Uruguay because his family was threatened by extortionists. He signed a contract with River Plate in 2014.

As of April 2017, he resides in Los Angeles, California, and is a free agent.

He played during the 2017 Spring Season with Ozzy's Laguna FC (United Premier Soccer League) and Santa Clarita Storm (UPSL), and was selected once as UPSL National Player Of The Week (March 3, 2017) and also received All-UPSL Team honors for the 2017 Spring Season.

=== International caps and goals ===
El Salvador's goal tally first.

International appearances and goals
| # | Date | Venue | Opponent | Result | Competition | Goals | Minutes played | Extras |
|---|---|---|---|---|---|---|---|---|
| 1 | 7 August 2011 | Robert F. Kennedy Memorial Stadium, Washington, D.C. | Venezuela | 2–1 | Friendly | 0 | 67 | (substituted off) 67' |
