= Manuel Camacho (footballer) =

Mexican footballer (1929-2008)

Personal information
- Full name: Manuel Camacho Meléndez
- Date of birth: 26 April 1929
- Place of birth: Zapopan, Jalisco, Mexico
- Date of death: 24 September 2008 (aged 79)
- Height: 1.78 m (5 ft 10 in)
- Position: Goalkeeper

Senior career*
Years	Team	Apps	(Gls)
1944–1946	Club América		
1946–1948	Veracruz		
1948–1949	Asturias		
1950–1953	Atlético Marte		
1953–1955	Club América		
1955–1959	Deportivo Toluca		
1961–1964	Club América		
1964–1966	Atlante		
1967	Chicago Spurs	28	(0)

International career
1956	Mexico	1	(0)
- * Club domestic league appearances and goals

Manuel Camacho Meléndez (6 April 1929 – 24 September 2008) was a Mexican professional football goalkeeper who played for Mexico in the 1958 FIFA World Cup. He also played for Deportivo Toluca.
