= Manuel Cañadas =

Salvadoran footballer (born 1947)

Personal information
- Full name: Manuel de Jesús Cañadas
- Date of birth: November 12, 1947 (age 78)
- Place of birth: San Miguel, El Salvador
- Position: Midfielder

Senior career*
Years	Team	Apps	(Gls)
1965	Atlante San Alejo		
1966–1971	Atlético Marte		
1972	Antigua GFC		
1973	Juventud Olímpica Metalio		
1974	Alianza		
1975	Luis Ángel Firpo		
1976–1978	Atlético Marte		
1981	Platense		

International career
1968–1976	El Salvador		
- * Club domestic league appearances and goals as of 2010

Manuel de Jesús Cañadas (born 12 November 1947) is a retired footballer from El Salvador.

== Club career ==
Cañadas has played the majority of his career at Atlético Marte, but also had spells at Alianza and Luis Ángel Firpo as well as in Guatemala with Antigua GFC.

== International career ==
Cañadas has played for El Salvador from 1968 through 1976 but missed out on the 1970 FIFA World Cup squad due to injury.
