= Guillermo Ragazzone =

Salvadoran footballer (born 1956)

Personal information
- Full name: Guillermo Lorenzana Ragazzone
- Date of birth: 5 January 1956 (age 70)
- Place of birth: San Salvador, El Salvador
- Position: Forward

Senior career*
Years	Team	Apps	(Gls)
1980–1987	Atlético Marte		
1988–1989	Cojutepeque		

International career
1982–1989	El Salvador	3	(0)
- * Club domestic league appearances and goals

Guillermo Lorenzana Ragazzone (born 5 January 1956) is a former soccer player from El Salvador.

== Club career ==
Ragazzone played for Atlético Marte in the 1985 league championship decider against Alianza, which Marte won 5–2 after extra time. In 1989, he played the championship final for Cojutepeque, this time losing out to Luis Ángel Firpo.

== International career ==
Ragazzone represented El Salvador at the 1975 Pan American Games and was a non-playing El Salvador squad member at the 1982 FIFA World Cup in Spain. He represented his country in two games during the 1990 FIFA World Cup qualifying rounds.

== FESFUT ==
Ragazzone was head of the technical department of FESFUT, the Salvadoran Football Association, but he left FESFUT in July 2008 after disagreements with federation president Rodrigo Calvo.
