= Mauro Aldave =

Uruguayan footballer (born 1984)

Personal information
- Full name: Mauro Esteban Aldave Benítez
- Date of birth: 11 July 1984 (age 42)
- Place of birth: Montevideo, Uruguay
- Height: 1.95 m (6 ft 5 in)
- Position: Striker

Team information
- Current team: Esporte Clube Juventude

Senior career*
Years	Team	Apps	(Gls)
2001	Colón	?	(?)
2002–2006	Rocha	39	(15)
2007	Cerro Porteño	?	(?)
2007	Bella Vista	7	(0)
2008	Unión Lara	?	(?)
2008	Sud América	?	(?)
2009	Municipal Liberia	?	(?)
2009–2010	Deportivo Merlo	20	(0)
2010	Durazno	10	(2)
2011	Técnico Universitario	?	(?)
2011	The Strongest	2	(0)
2013	Sud América	12	(2)
2013	Rocha	8	(1)
2014	Atletico Marte	17	(5)
2014	Esporte Clube Juventude	1	(0)
2015	Cerrito	22	(8)
2015	Fuerza Amarilla S.C.	2	(0)
2016 –	La Luz		
- * Club domestic league appearances and goals as of 3 January 2012

Mauro Esteban Aldave Benítez (born 7 November 1984) is a Uruguayan footballer currently playing as a striker for La Luz of the Uruguayan Segunda División Amateur in Uruguay.
