= Ricardo Sepúlveda =

Chilean footballer (1941–2014)

Personal information
- Full name: Ricardo Sepúlveda Johnston
- Date of birth: 19 May 1941
- Place of birth: Temuco, Chile
- Date of death: 3 February 2014 (aged 72)
- Place of death: El Salvador
- Height: 1.75 m (5 ft 9 in)
- Position: Forward

Senior career*
Years	Team	Apps	(Gls)
1958–1964	Colo-Colo		
1965–1968	Alianza		
1969–1971	Atlético Marte		
1972–1973	Municipal Limeño		

Managerial career
- 1981: Suchitepéquez
- 1986: Alianza
- 1986: Atlético Marte
- 1986: UES
- 1986: Independiente
- 1986: CD Santiagueño
- * Club domestic league appearances and goals

Ricardo Sepúlveda Johnston (19 May 1941 – 3 February 2014) was a Chilean football manager and player. He played as a forward, retiring in 1973.

== Managerial career ==
Following his retirement, he went on to manage several teams in El Salvador including Alianza, Atlético Marte, UES, Independiente and C.D. Santiagueño.

He coached Alianza to the 1987 final defeating Aguila on penalties.

He also coached in Guatemala with Suchitepéquez in 1981.

== Death ==
Sepulveda died in El Salvador on the 3rd of February 2014, aged 72.

== Honours ==
=== Player ===
Alianza

- Primera División de Fútbol de El Salvador: 1965–66, 1966–67,
- CONCACAF Champions' Cup: 1967

Atletico Marte

- Primera División de Fútbol de El Salvador: 1969–70, 1970–71

Colo Colo

- Primera División de Chile: 1962–63

=== Coach ===
Alianza

- Primera División de Fútbol de El Salvador: 1987
