= Mauricio González (footballer) =

Salvadoran footballer (1942-2018)

Mauricio "Pachín" González
Personal information
- Full name: Mauricio Ernesto González Barillas
- Date of birth: May 13, 1942
- Place of birth: San Salvador, El Salvador
- Date of death: 15 December 2018 (aged 76)
- Place of death: San Salvador, El Salvador
- Position: Midfielder

Youth career
- 1958: Atlético Luz

Senior career*
Years	Team	Apps	(Gls)
1959	Bolívar		
1959–1968	Atlético Marte		
1968–1970	Alianza		
1971–1973	Xelajú MC		
1974–1975	Platense		

International career^{‡}
1963–1971	El Salvador	21	(7)

Managerial career
- 2000: Atlético Marte
- * Club domestic league appearances and goals ‡ National team caps and goals as of July 22, 2011

Mauricio Ernesto González Barillas (May 13, 1942 – 15 December 2018) was a football player from El Salvador who played as a midfielder.

== Club career ==
González played the majority of his career for Atlético Marte, with whom he won one league title. He also had a spell abroad with Guatemalan side Xelajú MC.

== International career ==
Nicknamed Pachín, he represented his country at the 1968 Summer Olympics. González also participated at the 1963 CONCACAF Championship and the 1965 CONCACAF Championship where he scored a total of 5 goals in 10 matches.

== Personal life ==
Mauricio was the eldest brother of Salvadoran football legend Jorge Mágico González and son of Óscar Ernesto González and Victoria Barillas. He was married to Fermina and they had 5 children.

González died from natural causes on 15 December 2018.

== Honours ==
- Primera División de Fútbol de El Salvador: 2

1968, 1975

- Copa de Guatemala: 1

1973
