= Ramón Fagoaga =

Salvadoran footballer (born 1952)

Personal information
- Full name: Ramón Alfredo Fagoaga Romero
- Date of birth: 12 January 1952 (age 74)
- Place of birth: San Miguel, El Salvador
- Height: 1.83 m (6 ft 0 in)
- Position: Defender

Youth career
- 1961–1970: Pipiles de Víctor Manuel Píchez

Senior career*
Years	Team	Apps	(Gls)
1970-1972	Dragón		
1973-1982; 1984-1990	Atlético Marte		
1982	Deportivo Jalapa, Guatemala		
1983	Independiente de San Vicente		
1990	Alianza FC		

International career^{‡}
1976–1987	El Salvador	47	(0)
- * Club domestic league appearances and goals as of 11 April 2011 ‡ National team caps and goals as of 11 April 2011

Ramón Alfredo Fagoaga Romero (born 12 January 1952) is a former Salvadoran footballer.

== Club career ==
Despite suffering from asthma, Fagoaga started playing at the Pipiles youth team and when turned professional he played as a striker for Dragón in the Salvadoran second division. When he later joined Atlético Marte he was made a central defender since Marte already had seven strikers in the squad.

== International career ==
Fagoaga was a member of the El Salvador team at the 1982 World Cup in Spain and represented his country in 23 FIFA World Cup qualification matches. He played 105 matches for his country including non-official ones.

== Retirement ==
In 2006 Fagoaga was named temporary manager of FESFUT, the Salvadoran Football Association.

== Honours ==
- Primera División de Fútbol de El Salvador: 3

1980–1981 Clausura, 1982 Clausura, 1985 Clausura (C.D. Atlético Marte)

- CONCACAF Champions League Runners-up

1981 (C.D. Atlético Marte)
