= Carlos Castro Borja =

Salvadoran footballer (born 1967)

Personal information
- Full name: Carlos Alfonso Castro Borja
- Date of birth: August 1, 1967 (age 59)
- Place of birth: San Salvador, El Salvador
- Height: 1.65 m (5 ft 5 in)
- Position: Defender

Youth career
- 1986: Real Destroyer

Senior career*
Years	Team	Apps	(Gls)
1986	ADET		
1987	Chalatenango		
1988–1993	Atlético Marte		
1994	Grazer AK		
1995–1997	FAS		
1998	Zacapa		
1999–2000	Luis Ángel Firpo		
2001–2003	San Salvador F.C.		

International career^{‡}
1989–2000	El Salvador	57	(6)
- * Club domestic league appearances and goals as of 8 February 2011 ‡ National team caps and goals as of 8 February 2011

Carlos Alfonso Castro Borja (born August 1, 1967) is a retired Salvadoran football player.

His position was defender.

== Club career ==
In 1985, he became part of Destroyer in the B League and in 1986 made his Premier League debut with ADET and then transferred to C.D. Chalatenango to play alongside figures like Mauricio Cienfuegos, Carlos "Carlanga" Rivera and Edgar "Kiko" Henriquez. Then he campaigned with C.D. Atlético Marte where he gained prominence and was named to the national squad. He was also named Most Valuable Player in the first division for Atlético Marte in 1990.

Played also in C.D. FAS, Zacapa of Guatemala, C.D. Luis Ángel Firpo, C.D. Águila and played in Austria with Grazer AK in the Second Bundesliga and finally with San Salvador F.C.

== International career ==
Also in 1985 he formed part of a selection of youth who participated in a tournament in Trinidad and Tobago and then at the Central American Games held in Guatemala.

Castro Borja was a symbol within the national team in the years of 1992 to 1997. He is still remembered as one of the most passionate players who defended his national colors. He had great physical stamina, his sweeper skills were to be admired and also caused problems for rival strikers. He participated in the 1990, 1994, 1998 and 2002 World Cup qualification campaign. He scored the winner against Mexico in the 1994 World Cup qualifiers, which was the first time El Salvador had defeated Mexico in several years.

=== International goals ===
#	Date	Venue	Opponent	Score	Result	Competition
1	18 February 1992	Estadio Cuscatlán, San Salvador, El Salvador	United States	1-0	2-0	Friendly match
2	19 July 1992	Estadio Rigoberto López, Managua, Nicaragua	Nicaragua	3-0	5-0	1994 FIFA World Cup qualification
3	23 July 1992	Estadio Cuscatlán, San Salvador, El Salvador	Nicaragua	1-0	5-1	1994 FIFA World Cup qualification
4	23 July 1992	Estadio Cuscatlán, San Salvador, El Salvador	Nicaragua	3-0	5-1	1994 FIFA World Cup qualification
5	4 April 1993	Estadio Cuscatlán, San Salvador, El Salvador	Mexico	1–0	2–1	1994 FIFA World Cup qualification
6	23 July 2000	Estadio Cuscatlán, San Salvador, El Salvador	Saint Vincent and the Grenadines	2–1	7–1	2002 FIFA World Cup qualification

== Retirement ==
After finishing his football career with San Salvador FC, he traveled to Las Vegas, Nevada, where he currently resides with his family and is responsible for the school of soccer run by Cruz Azul.

== Titles ==
Season	Team	Title
1991	Atlético Marte	CONCACAF Cup Winners Cup
1994–1995	C.D. FAS	Primera División de Fútbol Profesional
Clausura 1999	C.D. Luis Ángel Firpo	Primera División de Fútbol Profesional
Clausura 2000	C.D. Luis Ángel Firpo	Primera División de Fútbol Profesional
