= Armando Contreras Palma =

Salvadoran football manager

Personal information
- Full name: Armando Contreras Palma
- Date of birth: April 14, 1947 (age 79)
- Place of birth: San Miguel, El Salvador

Managerial career
- Years: Team
- 1980–1987: Atlético Marte
- 1983: El Salvador
- 1988–1991: C.D. Chalatenango
- 1994: ADET
- 1996–1997: El Salvador
- 1999: Luis Ángel Firpo
- 2001: El Salvador U17
- 2003–2005: El Salvador U20
- 2004–2005: El Salvador
- 2006: Telecom
- 2007: Santa Tecla F.C.
- 2008: Platense
- 2009: Vista Hermosa
- 2010: Santa Tecla F.C.

Armando Contreras Palma (born April 14, 1947) is a Salvadoran football manager who created a legacy in El Salvador by winning three Primera División titles with Atlético Marte. He has also coached three El Salvador national football teams, most recently in 2004.

== Honours ==
Atlético Marte

- Primera División de Fútbol de El Salvador (Champions): 1980–81, 1982, 1985
- CONCACAF Champions Cup (Runners-up): 1981

Alianza

- Primera División de Fútbol de El Salvador (Runners-up): 1991-1992

Preceded by Juan Ramón Paredes	El Salvador national football team manager 2005	Succeeded by Carlos Cavagnaro
