= Luis Guevara Mora =

Salvadoran footballer (born 1961)

Personal information
- Full name: Luis Ricardo Guevara Mora
- Date of birth: 2 September 1961 (age 65)
- Place of birth: San Salvador, El Salvador
- Height: 1.86 m (6 ft 1 in)
- Position: Goalkeeper

Youth career
- 1978–1979: Platense

Senior career*
Years	Team	Apps	(Gls)
1979–1982	Atlético Marte		
1984	Once Lobos		
1985	Águila		
1986–1988	Atlético Marte		
1988–1991	Club Xelajú MC		
1992–1993	Aurora		
1994–1996	Atlético Marte		
1996–2000	Alianza		
2002	Atlético Marte		
2003	San Salvador F.C.		

International career
1979–1996	El Salvador	91	(0)

Managerial career
- 2000: Atlético Marte
- 2010: Atlético Marte
- 2016: Atlético Marte
- * Club domestic league appearances and goals

Luis Ricardo Guevara Mora (born 2 September 1961) is a Salvadoran former footballer who played as a goalkeeper.

Nicknamed el Negro, he became a member of the El Salvador national team and represented his country at the 1982 FIFA World Cup. Guevara remains one of El Salvador's best goalkeepers. He was known for his outstanding reflexes, leaping ability and acrobatic style of play, as well as his controversial antics off the field, which also earned him another nickname, 'el Loco'. He is the all-time cap leader for the El Salvador national team.

== Club career ==
In his early years, Guevara was a baseball and basketball enthusiast despite future national team goalkeeper Raúl Antonio García being one of his friends in school. He was tempted to train with Coca-Cola by former national team goalkeeper Raúl Magaña and then joined Platense to make his senior league debut at 16 years. He then played for Atlético Marte. He played for Once Lobos and again for Marte but since the Salvadoran fans still blamed him for the 10–1 drubbing in the Hungary v El Salvador match at the 1982 FIFA World Cup, he left for Guatemala in the end, to play for Club Xelajú MC and Aurora F.C. He only returned to his country after five years and spent time again at Atlético Marte before retiring at Alianza in 2000. He then became goalkeeper coach for the national team but returned to Atlético Marte as a player-coach when they were relegated to the Salvadoran Second Division. Finally, he retired again at San Salvador F.C. to become a manager.

== International career ==
At the age of 17, he was called up to play a friendly game against Panama in April 1979. He became the youngest goalkeeper in the national team's history.

Prior to the 1982 World Cup finals, during the qualification rounds, he only conceded one goal and played in a memorable victory against Mexico. At the finals tournament in Spain, he became one of the youngest goalkeepers to participate in the World Cup. In the first round, El Salvador lost to Hungary 10–1, and Guevara became the goalkeeper with the most goals scored against in a single World Cup match.

He played 91 times for his national team in which he earned 50 senior caps. He represented his country in 13 World Cup qualification matches. His final international game was a November 1996 FIFA World Cup qualification match against Panama.

== Personal life ==
Guevara is married to Flor de María and the couple have three children: Luis Ricardo, Ana Luisa and Gabriel Sebastián.

== Honours ==
- Primera División de Fútbol de El Salvador: 1981, 1982, 1997, 1999, 2003
- Guatemalan Premier League: 1993
