= Sergio Méndez =

Salvadoran footballer (1943-1976)

Sergio (El Tabudo) Méndez
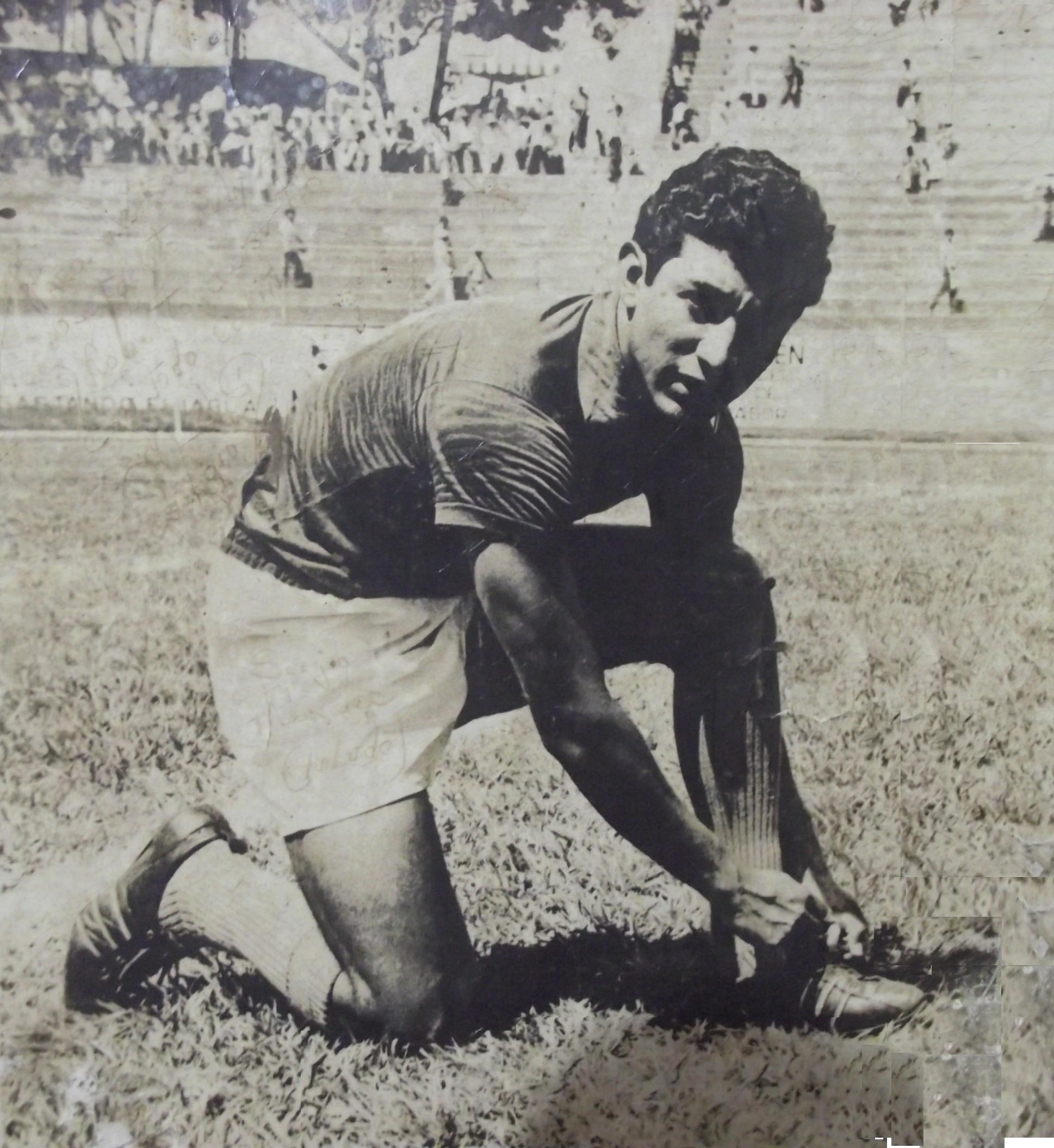

Personal information
- Full name: Sergio de Jesús Méndez Bolaños
- Date of birth: 14 February 1943
- Place of birth: Santa Elena, El Salvador
- Date of death: 18 December 1976 (aged 33)
- Place of death: El Salvador
- Height: 1.83 m (6 ft 0 in)
- Position: Forward

Youth career
- El Vencedor, Santa Elena

Senior career*
Years	Team	Apps	(Gls)
1964–1970	C.D.Águila	141	(83)
1971–1976	C.D.Atlético Marte	58	(31)
Total		199	(114)

International career
1965–1974	El Salvador	27	(14)
- * Club domestic league appearances and goals

Sergio de Jesús Méndez Bolaños (14 February 1943 – 18 December 1976) was a football player from El Salvador who represented his country at the 1970 FIFA World Cup in Mexico.

== Club career ==
Méndez came from a family of footballers, his younger brother and some first cousins were also professional soccer players for CD Luis Angel Firpo and Alianza FC. Nicknamed (El Tabudo) because of the town where he was born, Méndez played for Atlético Marte, C.D. Suchitepequez (Guatemala) and C.D.Águila where he was one of the top scorers during his years in the team.

Méndez was a very good friend of Brazilian defender Zózimo Alves Calazães, both met while playing for CD Aguila. Calazães said during an interview in 1968 for La Prensa Grafica, he'd never seen a midfielder-striker with the qualities of Méndez. "The speed, the aerial skills and his style of playing were incomparable, and those qualities made Méndez a very dangerous striker". He also predicted El Salvador was going to qualify for the FIFA 1970 Mexico World Cup. Ironically, Calazães also died in an automobile accident in 1977.

== National team career ==
Méndez played 7 matches for El Salvador at the 1968 Summer Olympics, after he had scored against Cuba in the qualifiers. Méndez also had the opportunity to play at the 1965 CONCACAF Championship where he played all of the games. In the Championship he started in 6 games, substituted in 2 games and scored 5 goals for the Salvadoran team. He also played in all the world cup qualification games scoring 3 goals and the three subsequent matches at the 1970 World Cup Finals.

== Personal life ==
Besides playing soccer and alongside being a professional soccer player, Méndez was pursuing his other passion of becoming a lawyer at the National University of El Salvador, at the time of his death he was already in his second year of his political science degree and was already teaching political and law science as a substitute professor in a private university. Salvadorean international footballer Mágico González said during an interview that Méndez was his inspiration to become a professional soccer player; "I always admired his style of play and his overall ability with the ball, he stated".

== Death ==
Sergio Méndez died in a car accident in December 1976. He is one of six Mexico 1970 FIFA world cup attended players and the 1968 Olympic footballers of El Salvador National team who have already died. Méndez was a very good friend of footballer José Quintanilla as they were also teammates in C.D. Atletico Marte and the national team.
