= Carlos Jurado =

Uruguayan footballer (1947–2023)

Jurado
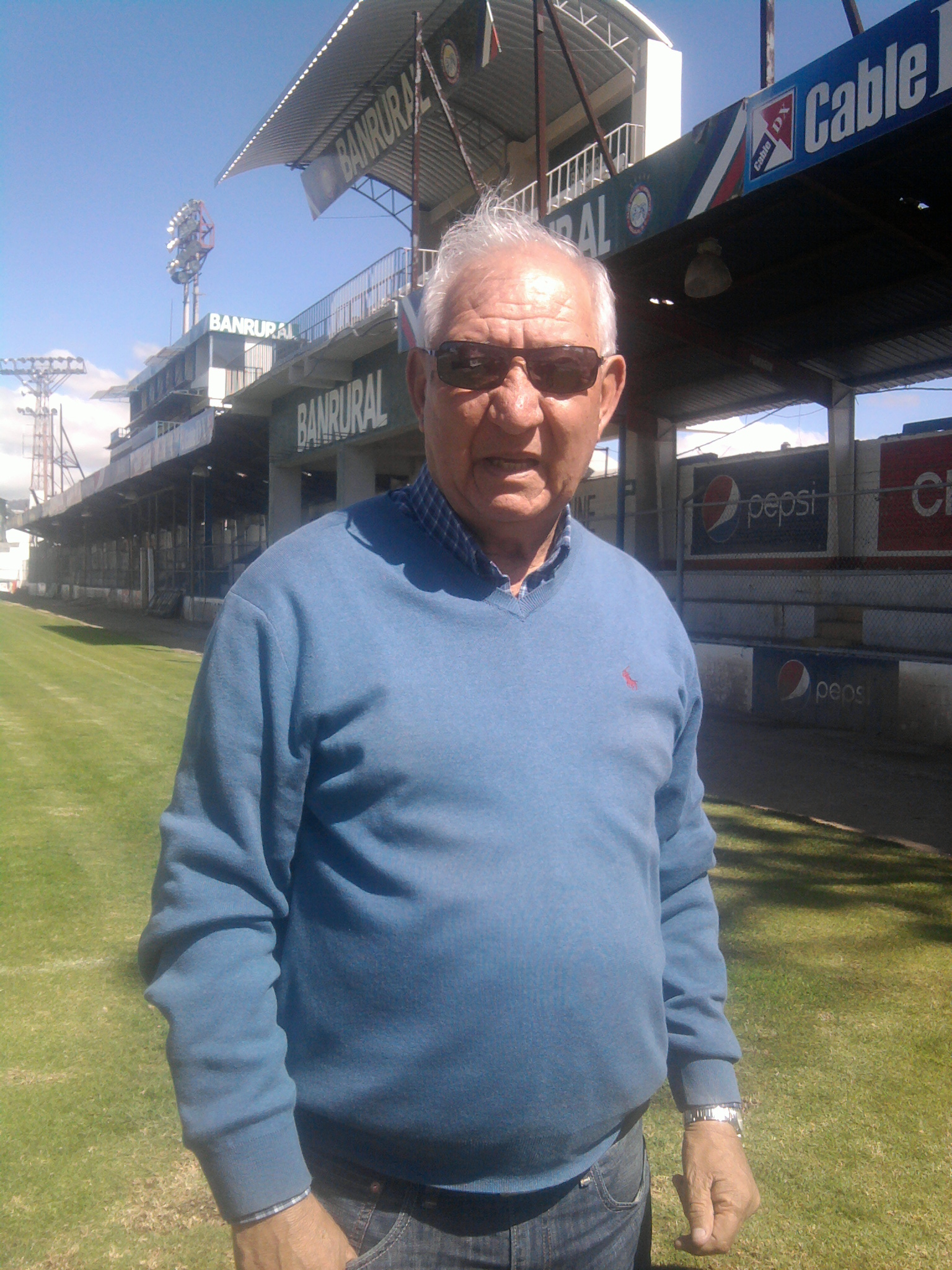
- Jurado in 2014

Personal information
- Full name: Carlos Daniel Jurado Román
- Date of birth: 11 June 1947
- Place of birth: Florida, Uruguay
- Date of death: 8 December 2023 (aged 76)
- Place of death: Quetzaltenango, Guatemala
- Position: Forward

Youth career
- Paysandú

Senior career*
Years	Team	Apps	(Gls)
1964–1965	Paysandú		
1965–1966	Peñarol		
1966	Porvenir Miraflores		
1966–1970	Atlético Grau		
1970–1971	Universitario		
1971–1972	Betis	1	(0)
1972–1975	Español San Vicente		
1975–1976	Orihuela Deportiva		

International career
19??–19??	Uruguay		

Managerial career
- 1976–1978: Hércules (youth)
- 1978–1981: Español San Vicente
- 1982–1983: Hércules (youth)
- 1983: Sant Joan d'Alacant
- 1983–1985: Hércules
- 1985–1986: Orihuela Deportiva
- 1986–1987: Atlético Marte
- 1988–1989: Motagua
- 1989–1990: Torrevieja
- 1991–1992: El Roble
- 1993: León de Huánuco
- 1995–1996: Motagua
- 2001–2002: Cienciano
- 2005: Cienciano
- 2006: Jalapa
- 2007: Xelajú
- 2007–2008: Jalapa
- 2008–2009: Alianza
- 2009–2010: Tampico Madero
- 2010: Melgar
- 2011: Xelajú
- 2011–2012: Cienciano
- 2013: Altamira
- * Club domestic league appearances and goals

Carlos Daniel Jurado Román (11 June 1947 – 8 December 2023) was a Uruguayan football player and manager.

== Playing career ==
Carlos Jurado began playing in the Paysandú, the team of the city where he grew up. Later he started in C.A. Peñarol where he played the first level of Uruguay. He went to Club Universitario de Deportes, where he played the first level in Peru. His good performances led him to Europe to play for Real Betis, but only played one game in La Liga. After a year idle his compatriot Sergio Rodríguez joined the UD Español San Vicente on third level.

== Coaching career ==
After finishing his playing career, he settled in Alicante, Spain. He began training at UD Español San Vicente, then on the Hércules CF youth teams, then to GCD Sant Joan d'Alacant was a reserve team of Hércules, and in 1983–84 season was allowed to coach the first team. He made some good numbers and Hércules promoted to La Liga. After Hércules CF, began a tour of Spanish and South American teams led him to train in six countries. In 2011 season he returned to where in the past Cienciano achieved success as the Clausura 2001 or Apertura 2005, or to qualify for the Copa Libertadores in 2002 for the first time in club history. On Cienciano he was known as "The Old Man".

== Death ==
Jurado died in Quetzaltenango on 8 December 2023, at the age of 76.
