= José María Rivas =

Salvadoran footballer (1958-2016)

Personal information
- Full name: José María Rivas Martínez
- Date of birth: 12 May 1958
- Place of birth: San Salvador, El Salvador
- Date of death: 9 January 2016 (aged 57)
- Height: 1.83 m (6 ft 0 in)
- Position: Striker

Senior career*
Years	Team	Apps	(Gls)
1978–1984	Independiente		
1985–1990	Atlético Marte		
1990–1991	San Pedro Dolphins		
1992	Huracán		
1992	Cojutepeque		

International career
1980–1989	El Salvador	47	(19)
- * Club domestic league appearances and goals

José María Rivas Martínez (12 May 1958 – 9 January 2016) was a football player from El Salvador.

== Club career ==
Nicknamed Mandingo, Rivas played several years for Independiente De San Vicente and Atlético Marte, with whom he won a League Championship in 1985. In 1990, he joined San Pedro of Belize and after leaving them had short spells at the end of his career in the Salvadoran second division with Huracán and Cojutepeque.

He won the 1985 Top league goal scorer award and also won the Golden Boot and Golden Ball in that year.

== International career ==
The moustached Rivas made his official debut for El Salvador in a March 1980 friendly match against Panama, played in 17 FIFA World Cup qualification matches and featured in all three of El Salvador's games at the 1982 FIFA World Cup in Spain. He scored 19 goals for the El Salvador national football team from 1980 to 1989. He scored 42 goals in 97 matches including non-official games.

His final international game was a November 1989 FIFA World Cup qualification match against the United States in St. Louis.

List of international goals scored by José María Rivas
No.	Date	Venue	Opponent	Score	Result	Competition
1	24 August 1980	Estadio Rommel Fernández, Panama City, Panama	Panama	1–0	3–1	1982 FIFA World Cup qualification
2	5 October 1980	Estadio Cuscatlán, San Salvador, El Salvador	Panama	2–0	4–1	1982 FIFA World Cup qualification
3	26 July 1981	Estadio Cuscatlán, San Salvador, El Salvador	Haiti	3–0	4–0	Friendly
4	22 April 1982	Estadio Olímpico Metropolitano, Tegucigalpa, Honduras	Honduras	1–1	1–1	Friendly
5	29 January 1984	Estadio Cuscatlán, San Salvador, El Salvador	Venezuela	3–0	4–0	Friendly
6	27 June 1984	Estadio Cuscatlán, El Salvador	Guatemala	1–0	3–1	Friendly
7	29 July 1984	Estadio Cuscatlán, San Salvador, El Salvador	Puerto Rico	3–0	5–0	1986 FIFA World Cup qualification
8	5 August 1984	Estadio Juan Ramón Loubriel, Bayamón, Puerto Rico	Puerto Rico	3–0	3–0	1986 FIFA World Cup qualification
9	9 October 1984	Los Angeles Memorial Coliseum, Los Angeles, United States	United States	1–0	1–3	Friendly
10	4 December 1984	Los Angeles Memorial Coliseum, Los Angeles, United States	Guatemala	2–0	2–1	Friendly
11	12 December 1984	Estadio Cuscatlán, San Salvador, El Salvador	Ecuador	1–0	1–1	Friendly
12	3 February 1985	Estadio Cuscatlán, San Salvador, El Salvador	Denmark	1–0	3–0	Friendly
13	3 February 1985	Estadio Cuscatlán, San Salvador, El Salvador	Denmark	2–0	3–0	Friendly
14	27 February 1985	Estadio Cuscatlán, San Salvador, El Salvador	Suriname	1–0	3–0	1986 FIFA World Cup qualification
15	27 February 1985	Estadio Cuscatlán, San Salvador, El Salvador	Suriname	3–0	3–0	1986 FIFA World Cup qualification
16	10 March 1985	Estadio Cuscatlán, San Salvador, El Salvador	Honduras	1–1	1–2	1986 FIFA World Cup qualification
17	7 October 1987	Los Angeles Memorial Coliseum, Los Angeles, United States	Guatemala	1–0	1–0	Friendly
18	25 June 1989	Estadio Cuscatlán, San Salvador, El Salvador	Costa Rica	2–3	2–4	1990 FIFA World Cup qualification

== Retirement and illness ==
After he retired, he was in charge of C.D. Árabe Marte and took the reins at FAS in 1999 along with José Luis Rugamas.

During his playing career, he had obtained his medical diplomas to become a doctor and was part of the El Salvador national football team medical staff. In June 2011, it became clear Rivas was seriously ill and needed a marrow operation, for which funds would be raised with a benefit match. A lot of former players were reunited to help Rivas. Rivas died of leukemia on 9 January 2016 at the age of 57.
