= Abdul Thompson Conteh =

Sierra Leonean footballer

Personal information
- Full name: Abdul Thompson Conteh
- Date of birth: July 2, 1970 (age 56)
- Place of birth: Freetown, Sierra Leone
- Height: 1.80 m (5 ft 11 in)
- Position: Striker

Youth career
- 1991–1992: UDC

Senior career*
Years	Team	Apps	(Gls)
1993–1994	Georgetown Cobras		
1994–1995	Atlético Marte		
1995–1996	Toluca		
1996–1998	Monterrey	15	(3)
1999	Motagua		
1999–2000	Comunicaciones		
2000	San Jose Earthquakes	31	(8)
2001–2002	D.C. United	30	(15)
2002	Pittsburgh Riverhounds	2	(0)

International career
1993–1997	Sierra Leone	17	(0)
- * Club domestic league appearances and goals

Abdul Thompson Conteh (born 2 July 1970) is a Sierra Leonean former professional footballer who played as a striker.

Conteh played three seasons in Major League Soccer, with San Jose Earthquakes in 2000 and D.C. United in 2001 and 2002. He scored a total 15 goals in league play. Conteh also played in Mexico (Toluca and Monterrey), El Salvador (Atlético Marte) and Guatemala (Comunicaciones), as well as the Pittsburgh Riverhounds of the USL A-League. He used number 690 in his shirt when he played with Monterrey in 1998.

In 2000, Conteh was named MLS Humanitarian of the Year for his work with the American Red Cross to "raise funds to try to allieve the suffering in Sierra Leone".

== Honors ==
Individual

- MLS Humanitarian of the Year Award: 2000
