= 1981 CONCACAF Champions' Cup =

17th edition of premier club football tournament organized by CONCACAF

- Dates: 26 April 1981 – 2 February 1982

Final positions
- Champions: (Suriname) Transvaal
- Runners-up: (El Salvador) Atlético Marte

The 1981 CONCACAF Champions' Cup was the 17th edition of the annual international club football competition held in the CONCACAF region (North America, Central America and the Caribbean), the CONCACAF Champions' Cup. It determined that year's club champion of association football in the CONCACAF region and was played from 26 April 1981 to 2 February 1982.

The teams were split in two zones, North/Central American and Caribbean, each one qualifying the winner to the final tournament. All the matches in the tournament were played under the home/away match system.

Surinamean team Transvaal won the two-legged series against Salvadorean Atlético Marte (2–1 on aggregate), becoming CONCACAF champions for the second time in their history.

== North/Central American Zone ==
=== First round ===
Team 1	Agg.	Team 2	1st leg	2nd leg
Atlético Marte (El Salvador)	5–3	(Guatemala) Juventud Retalteca	2–2	3–1
Marathón (Honduras)	5–1	(El Salvador) Santiagueño	4–0	1–1
Xelajú (Guatemala)	2–4	(Mexico) Tigres UANL	0–0	2–4
Real España (Honduras)	2–4	(Mexico) Cruz Azul	2–1	0–3

- Atlético Marte, Marathón, UANL Tigres AND Cruz Azul advance to the second round.

26 April 1981 1st leg	Atletico Marte (El Salvador)	2-2	(Guatemala) Juventud Retalteca	San Salvador, El Salvador
15:00	Norberto Huezo		Paulo Damasco; Dubón	Stadium: Estadio Cuscatlán; Referee: Rolando Paz Escoto

3 May 1981 2nd leg	Juventud Retalteca (Guatemala)	1-3 (5-3 agg.)	(El Salvador) Atletico Marte	Retalhuleu, Guatemala
	Ramon Fagoga own goal		Carlos Recinos; José María "Mandingo" Rivas	Stadium: Estadio Dr. Óscar Monterroso Izaguirre

1981 1st leg	Marathón (Honduras)	4-0	(El Salvador) Santiagueño	San Pedro Sula, Honduras
				Stadium: Estadio Francisco Morazán

May 18, 1981 2nd leg	Santiagueño (El Salvador)	1-1 (1-5 agg.)	(Honduras) Marathón	San Pedro Sula, Honduras
	Eraldo Correia		Jose Angel Pena	Stadium: Estadio Francisco Morazán

1981 1st leg	Xelajú (Guatemala)	0-0	(Mexico) Tigres UANL	Quetzaltenango, Guatemala
				Stadium: Estadio Mario Camposeco

1981 2nd leg	Tigres UANL (Mexico)	4-2 (4-2 agg.)	(Guatemala) Xelajú	San Nicolás de los Garza, Mexico
				Stadium: Estadio Universitario (UANL)

June 24, 1981 1st leg	Real España (Honduras)	2-1	(Mexico) Cruz Azul	San Pedro Sula, Honduras
	Junior Costly; Hernán Juvini Carreño			Stadium: Estadio Francisco Morazán

1981 2nd leg	Cruz Azul (Mexico)	3-0 (4-2 agg.)	(Honduras) Real España	Jasso, Mexico
				Stadium: Estadio 10 de Diciembre

=== Second round ===
Team 1	Agg.	Team 2	1st leg	2nd leg
Tigres UANL (Mexico)	1 - 2	(El Salvador) Atlético Marte	1 - 1	0 - 1
Marathón (Honduras)	4 - 2	(Mexico) Cruz Azul	1 - 1	3 - 1

- Atlético Marte and Marathón advance to the third round.

July 7, 1981 1st leg	Tigres UANL (Mexico)	1–1	(El Salvador) Atletico Marte	San Nicolás de los Garza, Mexico
	Tomás Boy 22'		Jorge Gonzalez pen 62'	Stadium: Estadio Universitario (UANL)

30 September 1981 2nd leg	Atletico Marte (El Salvador)	1-0* (2–1 agg.)	(Mexico) Tigres UANL	San Salvador, El Salvador
				Stadium: Estadio Cuscatlán

- 2nd leg not played, U.A.N.L. refused to travel to El Salvador due to political unrest; CONCACAF list the result as 1-0, probably having awarded the return to Atlético Marte

22 September 1981 1st leg	Cruz Azul (Mexico)	1–3	(Honduras) Marathón	Jasso, Mexico
	Mario Díaz Pérez 22'		Celso Güity 3' 86'; Enrique Mendoza 31'	Stadium: Estadio 10 de Diciembre

30 September 1981 2nd leg	Marathón (Honduras)	1-1 (4-2 agg.)	(Mexico) Cruz Azul	San Pedro Sula, Honduras
	Robert Bailey 83'		Carlos Jara Saguier 75'	Stadium: Estadio Francisco Morazán

=== Third round ===
Team 1	Agg.	Team 2	1st leg	2nd leg
Atlético Marte (El Salvador)	2-1	(Honduras) Marathón	0-1	2-0

- Atlético Marte advances to the CONCACAF Champions' Cup Final.

December 3, 1981 1st leg	Marathón (Honduras)	1–0	(El Salvador) Atletico Marte	San Pedro Sula, Honduras
	Celso Güity 16pen 16'			Stadium: Estadio Francisco Morazán

6 December 1981 2nd leg	Atletico Marte (El Salvador)	2-0 (2–1 agg.)	(Honduras) Marathón	San Salvador, El Salvador
	Antonio Infantozzi 7'; Herber Machón 8'			Stadium: Estadio Cuscatlán

*Marathón withdrew

== Caribbean Zone ==
=== First round ===
Team 1	Agg.	Team 2	1st leg	2nd leg
Kentucky Memphis (Trinidad and Tobago)	0 - 2	(Netherlands Antilles) SUBT	0 - 0	0 - 2
Sithoc (Netherlands Antilles)	1 - 5	(Suriname) Robinhood	1 - 0	0 - 5
Transvaal (Suriname)	3 - 2	(Trinidad and Tobago) Defence Force	1 - 0	x
Yama Sun Oil (Cayman Islands)		(Jamaica) Saint Thomas College		

- SUBT, Robinhood, Transvaal and Yama Sun Oil advance to the second round.

Kentucky Memphis (Trinidad and Tobago)	0-0	(Netherlands Antilles) SUBT

SUBT (Netherlands Antilles)	2–0 (2-0 agg.)	(Trinidad and Tobago) Kentucky Memphis

Sithoc (Netherlands Antilles)	1–0	(Suriname) Robinhood

Robinhood (Suriname)	5-0 (5-1 agg.)	(Netherlands Antilles) Sithoc

Transvaal (Suriname)	1–0	(Trinidad and Tobago) Defence Force

Defence Force (Trinidad and Tobago)	v	(Suriname) Transvaal

result 2nd leg not known, Transvaal qualified.

other fixtures not known but apparently Yama Sun Oil eliminated Saint Thomas College (home country unclear)

=== Second round ===
Team 1	Agg.	Team 2	1st leg	2nd leg
SUBT (Netherlands Antilles)	7 - 1	(Cayman Islands) Yama Sun Oil	5 - 0	2 - 1
Robinhood (Suriname)	0 - 0 (3-4 pen)	(Suriname) Transvaal	0 - 0	0 - 0

- SUBT and Transvaal advance to the third round.

SUBT (Netherlands Antilles)	5–0	(Cayman Islands) Yama Sun Oil

Yama Sun Oil (Cayman Islands)	1-2 (2-7 agg.)	(Netherlands Antilles) SUBT

Robinhood (Suriname)	0–0	(Suriname) Transvaal

Transvaal (Suriname)	0-0 (0-0 (Pen 4-3) agg.)	(Suriname) Robinhood

=== Third round ===
Team 1	Agg.	Team 2	1st leg	2nd leg
SUBT (Netherlands Antilles)	0 - 3	(Suriname) Transvaal	0 - 1	0 - 2

- Transvaal advances to the CONCACAF Champions' Cup Final.

SUBT (Netherlands Antilles)	0-1	(Suriname) Transvaal

Transvaal (Suriname)	2–0 (3-0 agg.)	(Netherlands Antilles) SUBT

== Final ==
x both matches in Paramaribo

=== First leg ===
1981 CONCACAF Champions' Cup Final
January 30, 1982
First leg

Transvaal (Suriname)	1–0	(El Salvador) Atlético Marte
Leisberger 84'	Report

André Kamperveen Stadion, Paramaribo, Suriname

=== Second leg ===
February 2, 1982
Second leg

Atlético Marte (El Salvador)	1–1	(Suriname) Transvaal
Wilfredo Huezo	Report	Wensley Bundel

André Kamperveen Stadion, Paramaribo, Suriname

Team details

Transvaal
At. Marte

GK	(Suriname) Barron
DF	(Suriname) Hagadeau
DF	(Suriname) Schaul
DF	(Suriname) Brammerlo
DF	(Suriname) Oehlers
MF	(Suriname) Wannenburg
MF	(Suriname) Leisberger
MF	(Suriname) Bundel
MF	(Suriname) Mortan
FW	(Suriname) Corte
FW	(Suriname) Theo Klein
Manager:
?

GK	(El Salvador) Carlos Cañadas
DF	(El Salvador) Milton Campos
DF	(El Salvador) Alfredo Rivera
DF	(El Salvador) José Castillo
DF	(El Salvador) Jorge Peña
MF	(El Salvador) Manuel Ramos
MF	(El Salvador) Danilo Blanco
FW	(El Salvador) Ramón Fagoaga
MF	(El Salvador) Norberto Huezo
FW	(El Salvador) Jorge Salomón
FW	(El Salvador) Miguel González
Manager:
?

Transvaal won 2–1 on aggregate.

== Champion ==
CONCACAF Champions' Cup
1981 Champions
(Suriname)
Transvaal
Second title
