= Ramiro Cepeda =

Argentine footballer and manager

Personal information
- Full name: Ramiro Augusto Cepeda
- Date of birth: April 25, 1975 (age 51)
- Place of birth: Buenos Aires, Argentina
- Position: Midfielder

Senior career*
Years	Team	Apps	(Gls)
1996–1999	Colegiales	68	(12)
1998–2000	Zacapa		
2000–2002	Suchitepéquez		
2003–2008	CD Atlético Marte		

Managerial career
- 2008–2010: CD Atlético Marte
- 2011: CD Luis Ángel Firpo
- 2012: Petapa
- 2012: Alianza FC
- 2013–2014: CD Luis Ángel Firpo
- 2014–2015: Alianza FC
- 2015–2016: USAC
- 2016–2018: Petapa
- 2018–2019: Xelajú
- 2019–2022: Iztapa
- 2022-2023: Antigua
- 2023-2024: CF Universidad
- * Club domestic league appearances and goals

Ramiro Augusto Cepeda (born 25 April 1975) is a former Argentine football manager and former player.

== Honours ==
=== Club ===
Alianza F.C.

- Primera División
  - Runners-up: Apertura 2012

=== Club ===
Antigua GFC

- Liga Nacional de Guatemala
  - Runners-up: Apertura 2022
