= Raúl Esnal =

Uruguayan footballer (1956-1993)

Personal information
- Full name: Raúl Esnal Ramirez
- Date of birth: 23 April 1956
- Place of birth: Montevideo, Uruguay
- Date of death: 15 December 1993 (aged 37)
- Place of death: Sonsonate, El Salvador
- Position: Defender

Senior career*
Years	Team	Apps	(Gls)
1977–1983	Montevideo Wanderers	198	(3)
1984	Union de Santa Fe	6	(0)
1985	Aurora		
1985–1987	Atlético Marte		
1987–1988	Maestranza		
1988–1989	Acajutla		
1989–1990	Tiburones		
1990	Fuerte San Francisco		
1991	Cojutepeque		
1992	Isidro Metapán		
1993	Apaneca		

International career
1983	Uruguay	4	(0)
Medal record
Representing Uruguay
Copa América
Winner	1983
- * Club domestic league appearances and goals

Raúl Esnal (23 April 1956 – 15 December 1993) was a football defender from Uruguay, who obtained a total number of 4 international caps for the Uruguay national football team.

== International career ==
He was a member of the team that won the 1983 Copa América.

== Personal life and death ==
Esnal is the father of Salvadoran footballer Cristian Esnal.

On December 15, 1993, he was murdered in El Salvador, on the road between Ahuachapán and Acajutla. The murder case has never been solved.

== See also ==
- List of unsolved murders (1980–1999)
