= José Luis Rugamas =

Salvadoran footballer and manager (born 1953)

Personal information
- Full name: José Luis Rugamas Portillo
- Date of birth: 5 June 1953 (age 73)
- Place of birth: San Salvador, El Salvador
- Height: 1.73 m (5 ft 8 in)
- Position: Midfielder

Senior career*
| Years | Team | Apps | (Gls) |
| 1970–1974 | Atlético Marte | | |
| 1974–1975 | Platense | | |
| 1975–1983 | Atlético Marte | | |
| 1983–1984 | FAS | | |
| 1984–1986 | Municipal | | |
| 1986–1988 | San Pedro | | |

International career
| 1976–1989 | El Salvador | 43 | (1) |

Managerial career
- 1996–1999: Atlético Marte (Reserve)
- 1996–1999: Atlético Marte
- 2005: El Salvador U-20
- 2006–2009: El Salvador (Assistant coach)
- 2010–2011: El Salvador (Interim coach)
- 2011–2013: El Salvador (Assistant coach)
- 2016: Diriangén FC
- * Club domestic league appearances and goals

José Luis Rugamas Portillo (born 5 June 1953 in San Salvador) is a Salvadoran football manager and former professional player.

He was interim manager of the El Salvador national team. As a player, he represented his country at the 1982 FIFA World Cup in Spain.

== Club career ==
Rugamas played the majority of his career for Atlético Marte with whom he won two league titles. He had earlier clinched a championship with Platense in 1975. At the end of his career he had spells in Guatemalan and Belizean football.

== International career ==
Rugamas represented his country in 16 FIFA World Cup qualification matches and played in two games at the 1982 FIFA World Cup.

His final international game was a September 1989 FIFA World Cup qualification match against the United States in Tegucigalpa.

== Managerial career ==
From 1996 to 1998, Rugamas managed the Reserves of Atlético Marte, including the Apertura 1998 and the Clausura 1999. In 1996, he became manager of Atlético Marte and would continue to do so until 1997. He also managed Atlético Marte in the Clausura 1999 and the Apertura 1999. He took the reins at FAS in 1999 along with José María Rivas.

=== National teams ===
In 2005, he became manager of the El Salvador national under-20 football team. From 2006 to 2009, under Carlos de los Cobos' reign, Rugamas was the assistant coach of the El Salvador national football team. After the resignation of de los Cobos at the end of 2009, Rugamas stepped up and became the interim coach for his country the following year. His contract would have expired in December 2010 as the interim manager although the CESEN and the FESFUT organized an agreement to let him manage the El Salvador national football team throughout the 2011 Central American Cup.

== Honours ==
=== Club honours ===
==== As a player ====
- Platense
  - Primera División de Fútbol de El Salvador (La Primera) (1): 1975
- Atlético Marte
  - Primera División de Fútbol de El Salvador (La Primera) (2): 1980–81, 1982
  - CONCACAF Champions' Cup Runners-up (1): 1981
- FAS
  - Primera División de Fútbol de El Salvador (La Primera) (1): 1984
