= Raúl Magaña =

Salvadoran footballer and manager (1940-2009)

Personal information
- Full name: Raúl Alfredo Magaña Monzón
- Date of birth: 24 February 1940
- Place of birth: Santa Ana, El Salvador
- Date of death: 30 September 2009 (aged 69)
- Place of death: El Salvador
- Height: 1.78 m (5 ft 10 in)
- Position: Goalkeeper

Senior career*
| Years | Team | Apps | (Gls) |
| 1958–1963 | FAS | | |
| 1963 | Tipografía Nacional | | |
| 1963–1964 | Municipal | | |
| 1964–1965 | USAC | | |
| 1965–1966 | Alianza | | |
| 1967 | Montreal Cantalia | | |
| 1968 | Toronto Falcons | 15 | (0) |
| 1968–1970 | Atlético Marte | | |
| 1970–1971 | FAS | | |
| 1971 | Once Municipal | | |
| 1975 | Alianza | | |

International career
| 1961–1970 | El Salvador | 28 | (0) |

Managerial career
- 1976, 1979, 1984, 1987: El Salvador
- 1980: Alianza
- Luis Ángel Firpo
- 1976: Platense
- Chalatenango
- Juventud Olímpica
- 2004–2008: Atlético Marte
- 1985–1986: ADOC
- * Club domestic league appearances and goals as of 2007

Raúl Alfredo Magaña Monzón (24 February 1940 – 30 September 2009) was a Salvadoran footballer and manager.

== Club career ==
Magaña made his debut aged 18 against Deportivo Saprissa in Costa Rica, coming on as a sub for Humberto Pérez. He played for several Salvadoran top level sides, most prominently for hometown club FAS, and also had spells in Guatemala and Canada. He finished his career with Alianza in January 1975.

During his stay at USAC, he earned himself an economy degree.

== International career ==
Nicknamed Araña (spider) and even El Gran Salvadoreño (the great Salvadoran), Magaña represented his country at their first ever World Cup, the 1970 FIFA World Cup in Mexico, the final match against the Soviet Union also being his final international. Like his idol, the legendary Lev Yashin, Magaña also dressed in black and wore caps.

== Managerial career ==
He managed the national side in four different periods, making his debut against Guatemala in 1976. One of his last tricks was to lead Atlético Marte back in the Premier Division after years in the doldrums.

Also, he was president of the CONCACAF Technical Commission for more than eight years.

== Death ==
Magaña died of gastric cancer on 30 September 2009, aged 69. He was survived by his 5 children.

== Honours ==
- Primera División de Fútbol de El Salvador: 6

1957–58, 1961–62, 1962, 1965–66, 1968–69, 1970

- Liga Nacional de Guatemala:

1963–64
