= Carlos Antonio Meléndez =

Salvadoran footballer (born 1958)

Personal information
- Full name: Carlos Antonio Meléndez Flores
- Date of birth: 12 November 1958 (age 67)
- Place of birth: San Salvador, El Salvador
- Height: 1.85 m (6 ft 1 in)
- Position: Goalkeeper

Senior career*
Years	Team	Apps	(Gls)
1977, 1978	Alianza		
1977	→ Platense (loan)		
1979–1980	Asociación Deportiva San Miguel		
1981–1983	Acajutla		
1984–1987	Atlético Marte		
1987	→ Acajutla (loan)		
1988–1989	Atlético Marte		
1990–1992	Alianza		
1993–1994	Luis Ángel Firpo		

International career
1977	El Salvador		

Managerial career
- 2002–2006: Independiente Nacional 1906
- 2006–2007: Nejapa
- 2008–2009: Chalatenango
- 2010: Alacranes Del Norte
- 2011: El Roble
- 2012–2013: San Sebastián
- 2013: UES
- 2013: Santa Tecla (assistant)
- 2015: Atlético Marte
- * Club domestic league appearances and goals as of 29 April 2017

Carlos Antonio Meléndez Flores (born 12 November 1958 in San Salvador, El Salvador) is a retired Salvadoran football (soccer) player.

== Club career ==
Nicknamed El Cacho, Meléndez, won the Salvadoran league title with Atlético Marte in 1985. In 1980, he played in Costa Rica for Asociación Deportiva San Miguel.

== Retirement ==
After he retired, he became a manager, and coached Independiente Nacional 1906, Nejapa F.C. and Alacranes Del Norte.

== Honours ==
- Primera División de Fútbol de El Salvador: 1

1985
