= Norberto Huezo =

Salvadoran footballer (1956–2025)

Personal information
- Full name: José Norberto Huezo Montoya
- Date of birth: 6 June 1956
- Place of birth: San Salvador, El Salvador
- Date of death: 5 March 2025 (aged 68)
- Height: 1.72 m (5 ft 8 in)
- Position: Midfielder

Senior career*
Years	Team	Apps	(Gls)
1974	CD UES		
1975	ANTEL		
1976–1977	Atlético Marte		
1977–1978	Monterrey		
1978–1982	Atlético Marte	23	(1)
1982–1983	Palencia	61	(2)
1983–1985	Cartagena FC	70	
1985–1986	Atlético Marte		
1987–1988	Herediano	23	(3)
1988–1990	Jalapa		
1991–1992	Deportivo Escuintla		
1992	Cojutepeque FC		
1993	CD FAS		

International career
1974–1987	El Salvador	48	(8)

Managerial career
- 2006–2008: El Salvador U17
- 2008–2009: El Salvador U20
Medal record
Representing El Salvador
CONCACAF Championship
Runner-up	1981 Honduras
Third place	1977 Mexico
- * Club domestic league appearances and goals

José Norberto Huezo Montoya (6 June 1956 – 5 March 2025) was a footballer from El Salvador who represented his country at the 1982 FIFA World Cup in Spain.

== Club career ==
Huezo started his career at UES and played for ANTEL before joining Atlético Marte in 1976. He then played in Mexico, but returned to Marte only to try his luck abroad again when he moved to Spanish side Palencia. He also played for Cartagena FC but returned to Marte again in 1985. He left after a year for Costa Rican outfit Herediano with whom he won a league title and then for Guatemalan side Jalapa. He finished his career at FAS.

== International career ==
Nicknamed Pajarito (little bird), Huezo participated in the 1975 Pan American Games hosted in Mexico. El Salvador competed in a group with Brazil, Nicaragua and Costa Rica. They debuted with a 4–1 win against Nicaragua on 14 October, with three goals from Huezo. El Salvador eventually finished third in Group D.

Huezo represented his country in 22 FIFA World Cup qualification matches and played in all three games at the 1982 World Cup Finals.

Huezo scored 16 goals for the El Salvador national team from 1973 to 1987.

== Death ==
Huezo died from complications of a stroke on 5 March 2025, surrounded by family and friends. He was 68.

== Honours ==
=== Club honours ===
==== As a player ====
- Atletico Marte
  - Primera División (2): 1980–81, 1985
- Herediano
  - Costa Rican Primera División (1): 1987
