= C.D. Atlético Marte =

Association football club in El Salvador

Atlético Marte
- Full name: Club Deportivo Atlético Marte
- Nicknames: El Inmortal (The Inmortal); Los Marcianos (The Martians); El Equipo Bandera (The Flag Team); El Bombardero Marciano (The Martians Bombers); Los Carabineros (The Police)
- Founded: 22 April 1950; 75 years ago
- Dissolved: 27 June 2023; 2 years ago
- Ground: Estadio Cuscatlán
- Chairman: (El Salvador) Luis Carrillo
- Manager: (El Salvador) Edson Flores
- League: ADFA San Salvador
- 2022 Apertura: Overall: 8th Playoffs: Quarterfinal
Home colours	Away colours	Third colours

Club Deportivo Atlético Marte, also known as Atlético Marte, was a Salvadoran professional football club based in San Salvador.

The club plays in the Primera División de Fútbol Profesional, the top tier of the El Salvador football league system, and host matches at the Estadio Cuscatlán.

Atlético Marte had a long-standing rivalry with their neighbouring club Alianza, with whom they have contested the derby since 1968.

Since its formation in 1950, the club has won eight Primera División titles—in 1955, 1956, 1957, 1969, 1970, 1980–81, 1982, and 1985—and the Segunda División de El Salvador once, in Torneo Clausura 2009).

In 1981, the team was runner-up of the CONCACAF Champions' Cup losing to SV Transvaal of Suriname. Atlético Marte won their inaugural international title, the 1991 CONCACAF Cup Winners Cup with 2 victories over Racing Gonaïves and Leones Negros UdeG and a loss to Comunicaciones F.C.

The club has changed their name several times to C.D. Árabe Marte (1998–99), (1999–00) and C.D. Atlético Marte Quezaltepeque (2006–08). The club returned to the original name in 2008; C.D. Atlético Marte.

In the 1980s, Salvadoran football legend Luis Ramírez Zapata and Norberto Huezo, Ramón Fagoaga, José Luis Rugamas were among their star players.

== History ==
=== Foundation and early history ===
The history of Atletico Marte started at the end of the 1940s, when the San Salvadoran team España FC was dissolved.

Emilio Guardado and Carlos Carranza, leaders of the recent dissolved España FC, called a meeting with the players that remained of this team and others in the capital city of San Salvador to give life to another club called Alacranes F.C.

After a year playing under the name of Alacranes F.C., club president Colonel José Castro Melendez called a meeting at the old national gymnasium, and at the initiative of the player Conrado Miranda, it was decided to change the club name to Atletico Marte.

The club was officially born on the 2 June 1950 by the combination of military-related members such as José Castro Melendez, Fidel Quintanilla and Jesús Rodríguez and the general public such as Emilio Guardado, José Santiago Avelar and Armando Carranza.

The original uniform colors were ochre and beige, however with the passage of time the colors were changed to the current blue and white.

One of the most significant events of Atetico Marte was a 2–0 triumph on the home turf of Deportivo Saprissa, the first time a Salvadoran club had defeated a Costa Rican side on the opponent's home turf. The goals were scored by Gustavo "el Bordador" Lucha y Raúl Peña.

=== Premierships success ===
The club had played in the Primera División for five years, however it wasn't until the 1955 season under the players-coaches of Conrado Miranda and Isaiah Choto they won their first title. This was done thanks to 1–0 victory over Leones de Sonsonate with the lone goal coming from Fernando "El Gato" Barrios.

The players included Manuel "Tamalón" Garay, Antonio Montes, Armando Larín, Rutilio Rivera, Luis Antonio Regalado "Loco", Conrado Miranda, Gerónimo Pericullo (Argentina), Juan Bautista Pérez (Argentina), Raúl "Pibe" Vásquez (Argentina), Gustavo "el Bordador" Lucha, Fernando "el Gato" Barrios and René Pimentel.

Atletico Marte with the same core group of players from the previous campaign and the inclusion of Guatemalan Gabriel Urriolawere able to capture their second title consecutively, always under the command of Conrado Miranda and Isaiah Choto.

In 1956–57 campaign, the club was rejuvenated with players such as goalkeeper Francisco "Paco" Francés, Argentinian Rodolfo Baello, Guillermo "Loro" Castro, Julio César "Muñeca" Mejía, Mauricio "Pachín" González and many others. The club was able to win their 3rd title.

A winning title would escape the club for more than a decade until 1969 when they won their fourth title thanks to future world cup coach Chilean Hernán Carrasco Vivanco and star players Raúl "Araña" Magaña, Guillermo Castro, Argentinian Rodolfo Baello, José Antonio "Ruso" Quintanilla, Chilean Ricardo Sepúlveda and Sergio Méndez. This was followed up with their fifth title in 1970 making the second time the club had won back to back title, this time they were reinforced with players such as Francisco Roque, Ernesto Aparicio, Manuel Cañadas, Adonay Castillo, Fernando Villalta, Roberto Morales, Elenilson Franco and Brazilian Odir Jacques.

Atletico Marte once again went a decade without a title, until 1980, when under the technical direction of Armando Contreras Palma and a squad predominately made up of Salvadoran players such as Carlos Felipe Cañadas, Milton Campos, Alfredo Rivera, José Castillo, Jorge Peña, Manuel Ramos, Danilo Blanco, Ramón Fagoaga, Norberto Huezo, Jorge Salomón Campos and Miguel González were able to win their sixth title.

Atletico Marte under the technical direction of Armando Contreras Palma and assistant coach former world cup player Juan Ramón "Mon" Martinez the club was able to win their seventh title i 1982. The tournament was called President Alvaro Alfredo Magaña Cup, in honor of the current president of the republic El Salvador. This was thanks to a two-game series win over Independiente of San Vicente, the first game was 1–0 victory with a lone goal José Antonio "Tolín" Infantozzi and this was followed with a 2–0 victory with goals by José Antonio "Tolín" Infantozzi and Wilfredo "El Doctorcito" Huezo.

On 25 December 1985, Atlético Marte won their eighth and final Primera División title. This was thanks to a 5–2 victory over Alianza with the goals of Atletico Marte coming from Salomón Campos Mezquita, Norberto Huezo, Mario Figueroa (2) and Wilfredo Huezo. The list of players that helped them win the title included José Luis Rugamas, Alfredo Fagoaga, Marcial Turcios, Santana Cartagena, Danilo Blanco, Guillermo Ragazzone, Nelson Escobar, Norberto Huezo, Salomón Campos, Mauricio Perla, Carlos Meléndez, William "el Pony" Rosales, Uruguayan Raúl Esnal and Mario Figueroa.

=== Champions of CONCACAF 1992 ===
On the international stage Atlético Marte had reached the final of the 1981 CONCACAF Champions Cup, however they lost the series to the SV Transvaal from Suriname. However, in 1991, the club was finally recognized internationally thanks to being crowned the champions of the CONCACAF Cup Winners Cup, a competition which was held in Guatemala and had strong clubs such as Universidad de Guadalajara from Mexico, Comunicaciones from Guatemala, Deportivo Saprissa from Costa Rica and Real Estelí from Nicaragua. Atletico Marte finished first in the group with a record of 2 wins and 1 loss.

=== Relegation to Segundo División ===
After several attempts to win another domestic title, by assembling top quality national and foreign players, Atletico Marte suffered a massive decline due to administrative mismanagement and eventually entered into economic crisis which led to poor results eventually getting the club relegated at the end of the 2002 season.

=== Promotion-back to the Primera División ===
However, leaders of Atletico Marte never gave up on the team and there was always a well publicized effort to return it to the Primera División. It was not until 2004, that the mythical Raul Alfredo "spider" Magaña approached the directors, presenting a draft where it recruited new sponsors and new management.

After almost five years of work, they won the Clausura 2008 title and would contest the winner of the Apertura to determine direct promotion. The loser would contest the ninth place side in the Primera División to determine if there should be promotion/relegation.

Atletico Marte was unsuccessful at apertura and clausura when they lost to Marte Soyapango in a penalty shootout in the semi-final.

On 14 June 2009 Atletico Marte returned to the Primera División by defeating AFI El Roble 3-1, at the Estadio Cuscatlan.

The only goal of this historic victory was by Roberto Maradiaga, and the technician that made possible the rise was the Argentine Ramiro Cepeda, a former player in Martian Segundo División in his first year working as a coach.

=== Modern era ===
Atletico Marte's run in the Primera División from 2009 to 2015 was a mix of little to moderate success, excluding the Apertura 2013 season where under the guidance of Guillermo Rivera the team finished first in the league (including a record 14 undefeated matches) and reached the semi-final where they were eliminated by the tournament champion Isidro Metapan 3–2 on aggregate, the team was a middle to low league team.

Although the emergence of players such as Gilberto Baires, Ibsen Castro, Otoniel Salinas, Javier Gomez, Anibal Parada, Christopher Ramirez, Christian Esnal, Argentinian Gonzalo Mazzia and Uruguayan Mauro Aldave.

On 3 May 2015, after 7 years of top flight football, Atletico Marte were relegated to the Segundo División despite a 4–1 victory over Dragon. They were knocked out by C.D. Pasaquina by one point. On 18 June 2015 the team purchased a franchise license in the new expansion of the Primera División and would compete in the Primera División for the Apertura 2015 season. At the end of 2016 clausura season, Atletico Marte were relegated

In April 2020, El Vencedor announced that due to financial hardship they would be releasing their spot in the Primera División to Atletico Marte.

After three years, with minimal success, On June 26, 2023, Atletico Marte sold their spot to Municipal Limeno and ended their spell in first division.

Atletico Marte due to complication on selling their spot to Municipal Limeno, Atletico Marte were registered to ADFA San Salvador in the fourth tier in Salvadoran Football league system.

== Honours ==
=== Domestic ===
==== Leagues ====
- Primera División and predecessors
  - Champions (8): 1955, 1955–56, 1956–57, 1969, 1970, 1980–81, 1982, 1985
- Segunda División and predecessors
  - Champions (1): 2008 Apertura (Note: On June 14, 2009, the club won the right to be in the Primera División by defeating AFI-El Roble of Ilobasco in the Finals of the Segundo División.)
  - Promotion Play-off Winners: 2008–09

==== Cups ====
- Copa President and predecessors
  - Champions (1) : 1991

=== CONCACAF ===
- CONCACAF Champions' Cup and predecessors
  - Runners-up (1): 1981
- CONCACAF Cup Winners Cup and predecessors
  - Champions (1): 1991

=== UNCAF ===
- UNCAF Champions' Cup/Recopa de la UNCAF and predecessors
  - Champions (1): 1991 Recopa de la UNCAF

== Performance in CONCACAF and Domestic competitions ==
- CONCACAF Cup Winners Cup: 2 appearances

Best: Champion in 1991
1991 – Champion
1994 – Quarter-finals

- CONCACAF Champions' Cup: 1 appearance

Best: Runner-up in 1981
1981 CONCACAF Champions' Cup: Runners up

- Copa Interclubes UNCAF: 5 appearances

Best: Third place in 1979
1971 Copa Fraternidad: Fourth place
1972 Copa Fraternidad: Group stage
1979 Copa Fraternidad: Third place
1980 Copa Fraternidad: Group Stage
1983 Copa Fraternidad: Group Stage

=== Overall seasons table in Primera División de Fútbol Profesional ===
Pos.	Club	Season In D1	Pl.	W	D	L	GS	GA	Dif.
TBA	Atlético Marte	65	1945	715	600	630	2872	2522	+350

Last updated: 17 July 2015

== Stadium ==
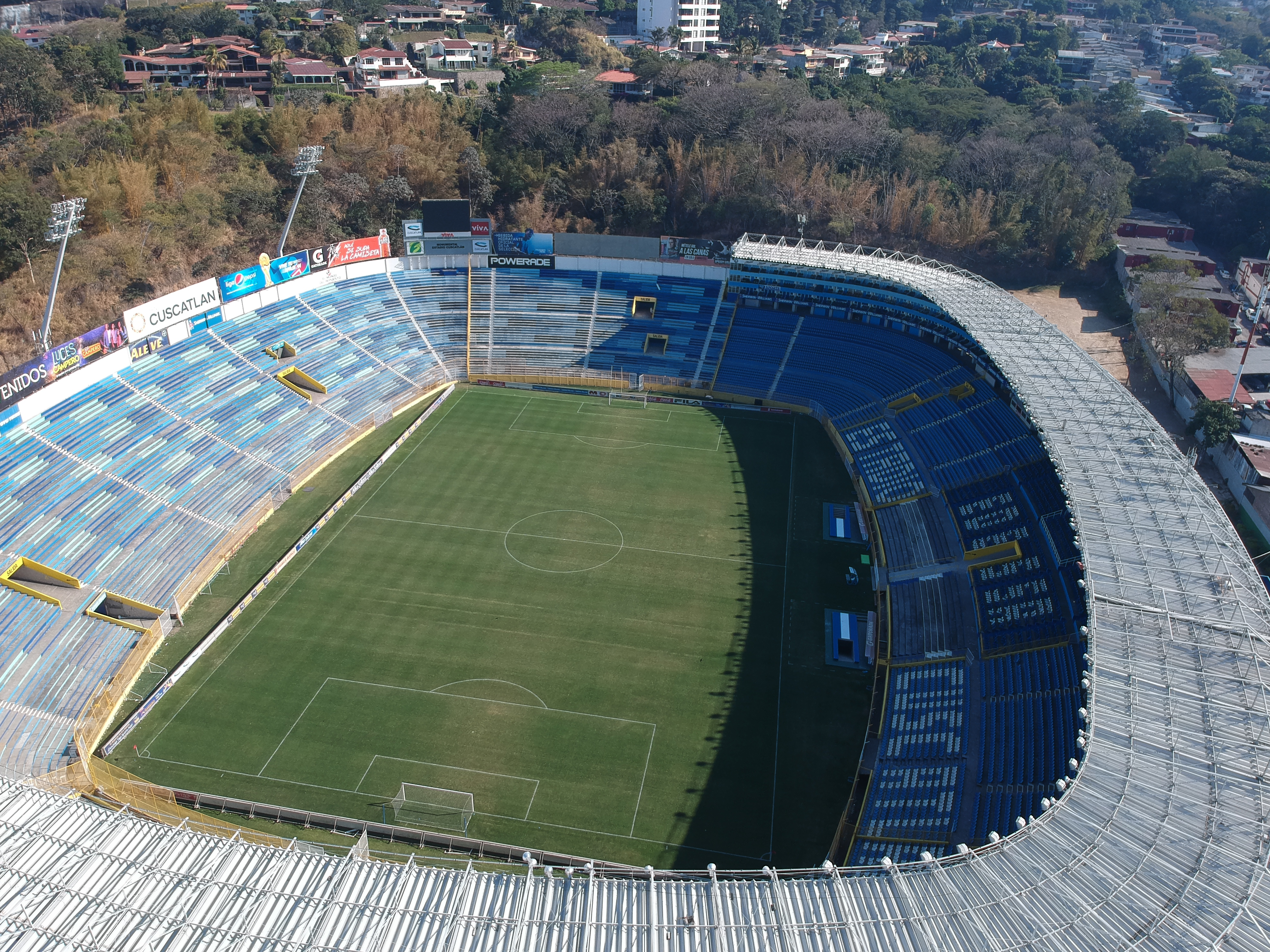
The playing field of the Estadio Cuscatlán

Since its establishment in 1950, Atletico Marte stadiums has been:

- Estadio Cuscatlán; San Salvador (2017–present)
  - TBD (TBD) game in Segunda DivisiÓn
  - Cancha Alfombrada Lirios de Quezaltepeque; Quezaltepeque (2005–2008) games in the
  - Cancha del Estadio Azteca; Ilopaneco (2016) games in the Segunda Division
  - Estadio San Vicente, San Vicente (2023-Present)
- Estadio Cuscatlán; San Salvador (2001–2005, 2009–2016)
- Flor Blanca; San Salvador (1950–2001)

The team plays its home games in the 45,000 capacity all-seater Estadio Cuscatlán, in San Salvador. Previously the team played at Flor Blanca, where they had played their home matches from 1950 until the end of the 2001 season. The stadium in San Salvador. The team's headquarters are located in TBD.

== Rivalry ==
Atletico Marte's chief rivalry is with the San Salvador-based team Alianza F.C., against whom they contest the Derbi capitalino. The two teams met 196 times since 1959, with the Alianza winning 87 matches, Atletico Marte winning 50 games and 61 draws. The most recent result was a 1–0 victory by Atletico Marte on the 2 April 2023.

== Sponsorship ==
Companies that Atletico Marte currently has sponsorship deals with for 2023–2024 includes:

- Arjam Sports – Official kit suppliers
- Sevisal – Official sponsors
- 106.9 FM – Official sponsors
- AmayaYArias – Official sponsor

=== Kit manufacturers and shirt sponsors ===
Atletico Marte's shirts have been sponsored by TBD since 2023. Previous sponsors have been Tapachulteca (1988–1999), TACA (1992), Pepsi (1999), Diana (2007–2013), Pilsener (2007–2013), Burger King (2013) and Tigo (2009). Their kits have been manufactured by Galaxia (since) . Prior manufacturers have been Galaxia (1999–2007, 2018), Kelme (2017) and Joma (2009–2013), Aviva (2018-TBD)

Period	Company
1955-1984	Nil
1985-1990	(United States) Pony
1990	(El Salvador) Galaxia
1994-1996	(El Salvador) Xara
1999-2001	(Mexico) Garcis
2011-2012	(El Salvador) Galaxia
2015	(United States) Rush Sports Wear
2017-2019	(El Salvador) Galaxia
2021	(El Salvador) Arijam Sports
2022-2023	(El Salvador) Tony Sports
2024–present	(El Salvador) Arijam Sports

== Current squad ==
As of October 2023 Note: Flags indicate national team as defined under FIFA eligibility rules; some limited exceptions apply. Players may hold more than one non-FIFA nationality.

No.	Pos.	Nation	Player
1	GK	SLV	Kevin Perez
2	DF	SLV	Alexis Mendez
3	DF	SLV	Michael Pleitez
4	DF	SLV	Emerson Carranza
5	MF	SLV	Cristian Vasquez
6	MF	SLV	Daniel Bonilla
7	MF	SLV	Bryan Martinez
8	MF	SLV	Daniel Ramos
9	FW	SLV	David Callejas
10	MF	SLV	Kevin Ramos (captain)
11	MF	SLV	Jonathan Aguilera

No.	Pos.	Nation	Player
12	DF	SLV	David Fuentes
14	DF	SLV	Rodrigo Campos
15	MF	SLV	Eduardo Hernandez
19	MF	SLV	Douglas Mejia
20	MF	SLV	Josue Garcia
21	DF	SLV	Alejandro Arias
22	MF	SLV	Fernando Trejo
24	FW	SLV	Carlos Mendez
25	GK	SLV	Steven Padilla
30	GK	SLV	Johnathan Orellana

=== Out on loan ===
Note: Flags indicate national team as defined under FIFA eligibility rules; some limited exceptions apply. Players may hold more than one non-FIFA nationality.

No.	Pos.	Nation	Player
—		SLV	TBD (at TBD for the 2023-24 Apertura and Clausura)

=== In ===
Note: Flags indicate national team as defined under FIFA eligibility rules; some limited exceptions apply. Players may hold more than one non-FIFA nationality.

No.	Pos.	Nation	Player
—		SLV	TBD (From TBD)
—		SLV	TBD (From TBD)
—		SLV	TBD (From TBD)

No.	Pos.	Nation	Player
—		SLV	TBD (From TBD)
—		SLV	TBD (From TBD)
—		SLV	TBD (From TBD)

=== Out ===
Note: Flags indicate national team as defined under FIFA eligibility rules; some limited exceptions apply. Players may hold more than one non-FIFA nationality.

No.	Pos.	Nation	Player
—		COL	Jhon Machado (To TBD)
—		SLV	Diego Chevez (To Alianza)
—	GK	SLV	Daniel Gutiérrez (To TBD)
—	DF	SLV	Geovanny Sigaran (To TBD)
—	FW	SLV	Daniel Barrera (To TBD)
—	MF	SLV	Roberto Melgar (To TBD)
—	GK	PAR	Sandro Melgarejo (To TBD)
—	DF	SLV	Reinaldo Aparicio (To TBD)
—	DF	SLV	Mauricio Cerritos (To TBD)
—		SLV	Ever Rodriguez (To TBD)
—		SLV	Diego Coca (To TBD)
—		SLV	Daniel Torres (To TBD)
—		SLV	Cesar Orellana (To TBD)

No.	Pos.	Nation	Player
—	DF	SLV	Mario Alfaro (To TBD)
—	MF	SLV	Mauricio Gomez (To TBD)
—	MF	SLV	Ramon Rodriguez (To TBD)
—		SLV	Gil Sanchez (To TBD)
—		SLV	Axer Lopez (To TBD)
—		SLV	Jonathan Palma (To TBD)
—		PAR	Luis Ibarra (To Managua FC)
—		SLV	Jonathan Esquivel (To TBD)
—		SLV	TBD (To TBD)
—		SLV	TBD (To TBD)

== Coaching staff ==
Position	Staff
Manager	(El Salvador) Edson Flores (*)
Assistant Manager	(El Salvador) TBD
Assistant Manager	(El Salvador) TBD
Reserve Manager	(El Salvador) TBD
Ladies's Manager	(El Salvador) TBD
Fitness coach	(El Salvador) TBD
Goalkeeper Coach	(El Salvador) TBD
Kineslogic	(El Salvador) TBD
Utility Equipment	(El Salvador) TBD
Football director	(El Salvador) TBD
Team Doctor	(El Salvador) TBD

=== Management ===
Position	Staff
Owner	Inversiones Sport Claros
President	(El Salvador) Luis Carrillo
Vice President	(El Salvador)
Secretary	(El Salvador) Marlon Claros
Sportraadslid	(El Salvador) German Estrada

== Notable players ==
=== Foreign players ===
Players with senior international caps:

- (Chile) Jose Moris
- (Costa Rica) José Luis Soto
- (Dominican Republic) Óscar Mejía
- (Guatemala) Luis Tatuaca
- (Honduras) Rafael Fabricio Pérez
- (Mexico) Manuel Camacho
- (Panama) Luis Ernesto Tapia
- (Paraguay) Jorge Lino Romero
- (Peru) Agustín Castillo
- (Peru) Fidel Suárez
- (Sierra Leone) Abdul Thompson Conteh
- (Uruguay) Alejandro Larrea
- (Uruguay) Raúl Esnal

=== World cup players ===
This list all the players that have represented their respective national teams at the World cup. Those in Bold were playing with Atletico Marte when they played :

- (El Salvador) **Raúl Magaña**
- (El Salvador) **Roberto Rivas**
- (El Salvador) **Santiago Méndez**
- (El Salvador) **Salvador Cabezas**
- (El Salvador) **Guillermo Castro**
- (El Salvador) **Ernesto Aparicio**
- (El Salvador) **Sergio Méndez**
- (El Salvador) **Luis Guevara Mora**
- (El Salvador) **Ramón Fagoaga**
- (El Salvador) **Silvio Aquino**
- (El Salvador) **José Luis Rugamas**
- (El Salvador) **Norberto Huezo**
- (El Salvador) **Guillermo Ragazzone**
- (Mexico) Manuel Camacho
- (Paraguay) Jorge Romero

=== Copa America winners ===
- (Uruguay) Raúl Esnal – Copa América 1983

=== Amílcar Cabral Cup winners ===
- (Sierra Leone) Abdul Thompson Conteh – Amílcar Cabral Cup (1993 Amílcar Cabral Cup) & (1995 Amílcar Cabral Cup)

=== Team captains ===
Name	Years
(El Salvador) Julio Cesar Mejia (**Muneca**)	1966
(El Salvador) Guillermo Castro (**Loro**)	1968
(El Salvador) Alberto Villalta	1969-1970
(El Salvador) Sergio Méndez	1975
(Brazil) Helio Rodrigues	1976-1978
(Argentina) Luis Cesar Condomi	1977-1978
(El Salvador) Miguel Gonzalez	1978
(El Salvador) Freddy Rivera	1981
(El Salvador) Manuel "Lobo" Ramos y Ramos	1982-1983
(El Salvador) Ramón Fagoaga	1985
(Uruguay) Raúl Esnal	1986-1987
(El Salvador) Norberto Huezo	1987
(El Salvador) Carlos Cacho Melendez	1989
(El Salvador) Santana Sanabria	1990-1991
(El Salvador) Carlos Castro Borja	1992-1993
(El Salvador) Wilfredo Iraheta Sanabria	1993-1994
(El Salvador) Ricardo Guevara	1994-1995
(El Salvador) Carlos Castro Borja	1996
(El Salvador) Juan Carlos Hernández Baldizón	2002
(El Salvador) Anibal Parada	2008-2012
(El Salvador) Gilberto Baires	2012
(El Salvador) Erick Molina	2013-2014
(El Salvador) Anibal Parada	2015
(El Salvador) Erick Molina	2016
(El Salvador) Diego Hunter	2019-2020
(Guatemala) Luis Tatuaca	2020-2021
(El Salvador) Jose Portillo	2021
(Colombia) Andrés Quejada	2021-May 2022
(El Salvador) Diego Chevez	June 2022- June 2023
(El Salvador) Kevin Ramos	July 2023-Present

== Club records ==
Sergio Méndez is the all-time leading goalscorer for Atletico Marte, with 146—since joining the club in 1971. Miguel Gonzalez Barillas, who is the comes in second in all competitions with 87. TBD is the club's highest scorer in a single season with TBD goals in 00 appearances in the 1957–58 season. The most goals scored by a player in a single match is 4, This was achieved by TBD in a game against TBD in the 1980 season. The biggest victory recorded by Atletico Marte was 8–1 against Aguila, Primera División, 5 December 1993. Atletico Marte heaviest championship defeats came during the 1989 season: It was against TBD in 1989 (1–7).

- Longest unbeaten run: 20 matches (1985 season)
- First and only Salvadoran team to win the CONCACAF Cup Winners Cup (1991)
- First coach of El Salvador that won three championships consecutively: Salvadoran Conrado Miranda with Atletico Marte in 1955–57.
- First Salvadoran team to win in Costa Rican: defeating Deportivo Saprissa 2–0, 1952.
- Last Salvadoran team to win a CONCACAF Competition: 1991 CONCACAF Cup Winners Cup

== Head coaches of Atlético Marte ==
The club's current manager is Salvadoran Edson Flores. 12] There have been TBD permanent and TBD caretaker managers of Atletico Marte since the appointment of the club's first professional manager, Emilio Guardado in 1950. The club's longest-serving manager, in terms of both length of tenure and number of games overseen, is TBD, who managed the club between 1996 and 2018. Argentine José Santacomba was Atletico Marte's first manager from outside the El Salvador. Salvadorans Conrado Miranda and Armando Contreras Palma is the club's most successful coach, having won three Primera División titles and one Copa El Salvador; followed closely by Chilean Hernán Carrasco Vivanco, who won two Primera División titles.

The following managers won at least one trophy when in charge of Atlético Marte
Name	Period	Trophies
(El Salvador) Conrado Miranda	1955–1957	3 Primera División de Fútbol Profesional
(Chile) Hernán Carrasco Vivanco	1968–1970, 2002	2 Primera División de Fútbol Profesional
(El Salvador) Armando Contreras Palma	1981–1985, 1991, 1997	3 Primera División de Fútbol Profesional, 1 1991 Copa El Salvador
(Uruguay) Carlos Jurado	1991	1 UNCAF Cup Winners Cup
(El Salvador) Juan Ramón Paredes	1991	1 CONCACAF Cup Winners Cup
(Argentina) Ramiro Cepeda	2008–2010	1 Segunda División de El Salvador

== List of presidents ==
Atletico Marte have had numerous presidents over the course of their history, some of which have been the owners of the club, others have been Military rulers. Here is a complete list from when Jesús Rodolfo Rodríguez took over at the club in 1950, until the present day.

Name	Years
(El Salvador) Jesús Rodolfo Rodríguez (Military Leader)	1950
(El Salvador) José Castro Meléndez (Military Leader)	1950
(El Salvador) Carlos H. Cornejo (Military Leader)	TBD
(El Salvador) Salvador Henríquez (Military Leader)	TBD
(El Salvador) Oscar René Serrano (Military Leader)	1973
(El Salvador) Miguel Angel Castillo (Military Leader)	TBD
(El Salvador) Angel Napoleón Orantes (Military Leader)	TBD
(El Salvador) Jesús Gabriel Contreras (Military Leader)	TBD
(El Salvador) Max Leiva (Military Leader)	TBD
(El Salvador) Jorge Alberto Domínguez (Military Leader)	TBD
(El Salvador) Marco A. González (Military Leader)	TBD
(El Salvador) Mauricio Ernesto Vargas (Military Leader)	1995
(El Salvador) Héctor Lobo (Military Leader)	TBD
(El Salvador) Sigifredo Ochoa Pérez (Military Leader)	TBD
(El Salvador) Mauricio Hernandez (Military Leader)	1988–89

Name	Years
(El Salvador) Esteban Munguía	TBD
(El Salvador) Félix Castillo Mayorga	1982–84
(El Salvador) Felipe Mira, Orlando Calderón	TBD
(El Salvador) José A. Platero	TBD
(El Salvador) Odilio Viche	TBD
(El Salvador) Saúl Salguero	TBD
(El Salvador) Otmaro Luna	TBD
(El Salvador) Osmín Viscarra	TBD
(El Salvador) Emilio Charur	TBD
(El Salvador) Ernesto "El Chato" Vargas	1994
(El Salvador) Mauricio Ernesto Vargas	1997–98
(El Salvador) Rafael Ignacio Perez	1999-TBD
(El Salvador) Vicente Carranza	2001
(El Salvador) Félix Guardado	2002–12
(El Salvador) Hugo Carrillo	2012–2016
(El Salvador) Tomas Aguirre	2017–18
(El Salvador) Hugo Carrillo	2019–2022
(El Salvador) Marlon Claros	2023–Present

== Notes ==
https://www.lacarnerds.com/
