= 1994–95 C.F. Monterrey season =

CF Monterrey
1994–95 season
- Owner: Abaco Financial Group
- President: Jorge Lankenau
- Manager: Arturo Salah
- Stadium: Tecnológico
- Primera Division: 11th Repechaje
- Copa Mexico: first round
- Top goalscorer: Careca, Verdirame (8 goals)
Home colours	Away colours
- All statistics correct as of 27 January 2019.

The 1994–95 CF Monterrey season is the 49th campaign in existence and 36th consecutive season in the top flight division of Mexican football.

== Summary ==
In summertime the club appointed Chilean Arturo Salah as its new head coach. Also chairman Jorge Lankenau reinforced the squad with several players such as: Chilean Forward Anibal Gonzalez, Argentine Striker Roberto Gasparini, midfielder Roberto Medina and centre back defender Juan de Dios Ramirez Perales. The offensive line with just 37 goals collapsed to the second worst of the entire league (only ahead of local arch-rivals Tigres UANL) with Careca, Verdirame scoring only 8 goals, while Mario Jauregui scored 7 goals, on the contrary, new arrivals Gonzalez and Gasparini were null. It was the defensive line led by goalkeeper Ruben Ruiz Diaz which levered up the team to the Repechaje -ahead of Leon and Atlas FC in the mediocre group 4- only to be defeated by Incumbent Champions Tecos UAG despite won the first match of the series 2–0 the next game the squad lost by the same score being eliminated due to its 11th spot on the overall table.

== Squad ==
Note: Flags indicate national team as defined under FIFA eligibility rules; some limited exceptions apply. Players may hold more than one non-FIFA nationality.

No.	Pos.	Nation	Player
—	GK	PAR	Ruben Ruiz Diaz
—	DF	MEX	Marcos Ayala
—	DF	MEX	Miguel Garcia
—	DF	MEX	Rafael Gutiérrez Aldaco
—	DF	MEX	Jose Juan Hernandez
—	DF	MEX	Juan de Dios Ramirez Perales
—	DF	MEX	Abraham Nava
—	MF	MEX	Jesus Arellano
—	MF	CHI	Fabian Guevara
—	MF	MEX	Roberto Medina
—	MF	MEX	Ramon Morales
—	MF	MEX	Raul Aredes

No.	Pos.	Nation	Player
—	MF	MEX	Jose Antonio Noriega
—	MF	MEX	David Patiño
—	FW	BRA	Careca
—	FW	ARG	Sergio Verdirame
—	FW	CHI	Anibal Gonzalez
—	FW	MEX	Mario Jauregui
—	MF	MEX	Martin Hernandez
—	MF	MEX	Jose Nieves Castro
—	DF	MEX	Hector Nicanor
—	MF	MEX	Oscar Pantoja
—	GK	MEX	Tirzo Carpizo
—	FW	ARG	Roberto Gasparini

=== Transfers ===
In
Pos.	Name	from	Type
FW	Anibal Gonzalez	Colo-Colo	loan ended
DF	Juan de Dios Ramirez Perales	Pumas UNAM	
DF	Rafael Gutierrez Aldaco	Leones Negros UdeG	
MF	Guadalupe Alonso	Queretaro FC	
DF	Miguel Garcia	CD Guadalajara	
MF	Roberto Medina	Tecos UAG	
FW	Roberto Gasparini	Tigres UANL	

Out
Pos.	Name	To	Type
FW	Luis Hernandez	Necaxa	
DF	Gerardo Jimenez	Tampico Madero	
DF	Edgar Plascencia	Puebla FC	
DF	Roberto Hernandez	Atlético Morelia	

==== Winter ====
In
Pos.	Name	from	Type
FW	Roberto Gasparini		

Out
Pos.	Name	To	Type
FW	Fabian Guevara		

== Competitions ==
=== La Liga ===
==== League table ====
===== Group 1 =====
Pos	Team	Pld	W	D	L	GF	GA	GD	Pts	Qualification
1	Santos Laguna	36	13	9	14	61	62	−1	35	Playoff
2	Monterrey	36	9	15	12	37	52	−15	33	Playoff
3	Atlas	36	12	8	16	43	52	−9	32	
4	León	36	11	9	16	39	55	−16	31	

===== General table =====
Pos	Team	Pld	W	D	L	GF	GA	GD	Pts	Qualification
9	Veracruz	36	12	11	13	43	51	−8	35	Qualification for the Repechaje (Note: Teams ranked 5th, 7th, 9th and 11th in the table qualified for Repechaje)
10	Atlante	36	11	11	14	57	69	−12	33	
11	Monterrey	36	9	15	12	37	52	−15	33	Qualification for the Repechaje
12	Toros Neza	36	12	8	16	55	62	−7	32	
13	Atlas	36	12	8	16	43	52	−9	32	

Source: Liga MX
Rules for classification: 1) Points; 2) Goal difference; 3) Number of goals scored; 4) Head-to-head results between tied teams; 5) Number of goals scored away; 6) Highest relegation coefficient; 7) Fair Play points

===== Results by round =====
Round	1	2	3	4	5	6	7	8	9	10	11	12	13	14	15	16	17	18	19	20	21	22	23	24	25	26	27	28	29	30	31	32	33	34	35	36	37	38
Ground	A	H	A	H	A	H	A	H	A	H	A	H	H	A	H	A	H	A	H	H	A	H	A	H	A	H	A	H	A	H	A	A	H	A	H	A	H	A
Result	W	L	D	L	D	D	D	D	L	D	W	D	D	W	D	L	-	D	L	L	W	L	W	D	L	L	D	D	L	W	W	D	W	L	L	-	W	D
Position	9	13	10	15	16	14	13	11	14	14	11	11	11	8	9	9	12	11	12	12	12	12	12	12	12	13	13	13	14	12	10	10	9	11	13	12	12	11

Source: Competitive matches
A = Away; H = Home; W = Win; D = Draw; L = Loss; P = Postponed; = Leader, Qualification for the quarter-finals; C = Qualification for the quarter-finals as group leader.; E = Qualification for the quarter-finals as group runner-up.; R = Qualification for the Repechaje.

==== Matches ====
3 September 1994 1	Monterrey	1–0	Pumas UNAM	Monterrey
	Verdirame 6'			Stadium: Tecnológico

10 September 1994 2	Tampico Madero	4–1	Monterrey	Tampico
	Gerardo Jiménez 12'; Rubén Martínez 23'; Héctor del Ángel 80'; René Mendieta 82'		10' Verdirame	Stadium: Tamaulipas

17 September 1994 3	Monterrey	1–1	Necaxa	Monterrey
	Verdirame 45' (pen.)		9' (pen.) Aspe	Stadium: Tecnológico

25 September 1994 4	CD Toluca	2–0	Monterrey	Toluca
	Bernal 9' (pen.); Claudio Sppontón 82'			Stadium: La Bombonera

2 October 1994 5	Puebla FC	0–0	Monterrey	Puebla de los Angeles
				Stadium: Cuauhtemoc

8 October 1994 6	Monterrey	0–0	Leon	Monterrey
				Stadium: Tecnológico

15 October 1994 7	Atlas FC	2–2	Monterrey	Guadalajara
	Berizzo 29' (pen.); Lunari 51'		25', 70' Careca	Stadium: Jalisco

22 October 1994 8	Monterrey	0–0	Tecos UAG	Monterrey
				Stadium: Tecnológico

30 October 1994 9	Santos Laguna	1–0	Monterrey	Torreon
	Fernando Gil 25'			Stadium: Corona

5 November 1994 10	Monterrey	2–2	Cruz Azul	Monterrey
	Héctor Nicanor 14'; Rafael Gutiérrez Aldaco 60'		5' Mora; 33' Hermosillo	Stadium: Tecnológico

13 November 1994 11	Atlético Morelia	1–2	Monterrey	Morelia
	Figueroa 3'		Arellano 59'; Oscar Pantoja 60'	Stadium: Morelos

19 November 1994 12	Monterrey	1–1	Atlante FC	Monterrey
	Arellano 38'		65' Romano	Stadium: Tecnológico

27 November 1994 13	Correcaminos UAT	1–1	Monterrey	Ciudad Victoria
	Carlos Orozco 73'		50' Noriega	Stadium: Marte R.Gomez

30 November 1994 14	Monterrey	1–0	Tigres UANL	Monterrey
	Rafael Gutiérrez Aldaco 72'			Stadium: Tecnológico

4 December 1994 15	Toros Neza	1–1	Monterrey	Ciudad Nezahualcoyotl
	Gonzalo Farfán 18'		64' Careca	Stadium: Neza 86

10 December 1994 16	Monterrey	1–2	CD Guadalajara	Monterrey
	Careca 74'		Ramón Ramírez 63'; 72' Daniel Guzmán	Stadium: Tecnológico

17 December 1994 17	Leones Negros UdeG	bye	Monterrey	Guadalajara
				Stadium: Jalisco

22 December 1994 18	Monterrey	0–0	Veracruz	Monterrey
				Stadium: Tecnológico

30 December 1994 19	America	2–1	Monterrey	Tlalpan
	Biyik 72'; Zague 77'		10' Careca	Stadium: Azteca

7 January 1995 20	Pumas UNAM	3–0	Monterrey	Tlalpan
	Oteo 35'; Israel López 77'; Rafael García 89'			Stadium: Olimpico Universitario

14 January 1995 21	Monterrey	2–1	TM Gallos Blancos	Monterrey
	Mario Jauregui 45', 70'		42' René Mendieta	Stadium: Tecnológico

23 January 1995 22	Necaxa	6–0	Monterrey	Tlalpan
	Pelaez 28', 73', 86'; Basay 67'; Zarate 80'; Aguinaga 82'			Stadium: Azteca

28 January 1995 23	Monterrey	3–0	CD Toluca	Monterrey
	Verdirame 2' (pen.), 40'; Guevara 17'			Stadium: Tecnológico

3 February 1995 24	Monterrey	1–1	Puebla FC	Monterrey
	Arellano 2'		6'Antonio Teodoro Dos Santos "Toninho"	Stadium: Tecnológico

12 February 1995 25	Leon	1–0	Monterrey	Leon de los Aldama
	Uidemar 69'			Stadium: Nou Camp

18 February 1995 26	Monterrey	0–1	Atlas FC	Monterrey
			22' Pavel Pardo	Stadium: Tecnológico

24 February 1995 27	Tecos UAG	2–2	Monterrey	Zapopan
	Claudio Morena 20'; Donizete 62'		2' Patiño; 75' Verdirame	Stadium: 3 de Marzo

4 March 1995 28	Monterrey	1–1	Santos Laguna	Monterrey
	Careca 58'		68' Miguel Asprilla	Stadium: Tecnológico

11 March 1995 29	Cruz Azul	6–0	CF Monterrey	Tlalpan
	Hermosillo 20'; Zamora 27' (pen.); Zamora 62'; Hermosillo 64' (pen.); Hermosillo 75'; Hermosillo 87'			Stadium: Azteca

17 March 1995 30	Monterrey	2–1	Atlético Morelia	Monterrey
	Mario Jauregui 20', 80'		12' Figueroa	Stadium: Tecnológico

26 March 1995 31	Atlante FC	1–2	Monterrey	Benito Juarez
	Sanchez 59'		38' Jauregui; 82' Guevara	Stadium: Azulgrana

1 April 1995 32	Monterrey	1–1	Correcaminos UAT	Monterrey
	Verdirame 61'		89' Ricardo Chávez Medrano	Stadium: Tecnológico

5 April 1995 33	Tigres UANL	1–2	Monterrey	San Nicolas de los Garza
	Napoles 60'		15' Careca; 38' Verdirame	Stadium: Universitario

8 April 1995 34	Monterrey	0–1	Toros Neza	Monterrey
			24' Vilallonga	Stadium: Tecnologico

16 April 1995 35	CD Guadalajara	2–1	Monterrey	Guadalajara
	Missael Espinosa 13'; Ramón Ramírez 77'		48' Jáuregui	Stadium: Jalisco

23 April 1995 36	Monterrey	bye	Leones Negros UdeG	Monterrey
				Stadium: Tecnológico

29 April 1995 37	Veracruz	2–4	Monterrey	Veracruz
	Leonel Bolsonello 29' (pen.); Marco Antonio Benatto "Marquinho" 51'		42' José Nieves Castro; 46' Medina; 75' Careca; 89' Noriega	Stadium: Pirata Fuente

6 May 1995 38	Monterrey	1–1	America	Monterrey
	Jáuregui 30'		57' Garcia	Stadium: Tecnologico

===== Repechaje =====
10 May 1995	Monterrey	2–0	Tecos UAG	Monterrey
20:45	Jauregui 4'; Patiño 85'			Stadium: Tecnologico

13 May 1995	Tecos UAG	2–0	Monterrey	Zapopan
20:30	Ordiales 33'; Malibrán 81'			Stadium: 3 de Marzo
