= 1993 CONCACAF Cup Winners Cup =

Recopa CONCACAF
- Dates: 18 November 1992–1 August 1993

Final positions
- Champions: (Mexico) Monterrey (1st title)
- Runners-up: (Honduras) Real España
- Third place: (El Salvador) Luis Ángel Firpo
- Fourth place: (Guatemala) Suchitepéquez
- All statistics correct as of 10 September 2011.

The 1993 CONCACAF Cup Winners Cup was the second edition of the CONCACAF Cup Winners Cup. Mexican side C.F. Monterrey won the tournament as winner of the Final stage played at Monterey Park, California from 28 July to 1 August.

== Preliminary round ==
=== North American Zone ===
18 November 1992

San Jose Oaks (United States)	1–4	(Mexico) Monterrey
John Hughes 78'		Carlos Alberto Bianchezi 14', 70', 90'; Sergio Verdirame 22'

Spartan Stadium, San José
1 December 1992

Monterrey (Mexico)	6–0	(United States) San Jose Oaks
Gerardo Jiménez 67'; Porfirio Jiménez 69'; Carlos Alberto Bianchezi 72', 78'; Luis Hernández 82'; Sergio Verdirame 88'

Estadio Tecnológico, Monterrey

Monterrey qualified for Next Round

=== Central American Zone ===
8 November 1992

La Victoria (Belize)	2–3	(Honduras) Real España

Estadio Francisco Morazán, San Pedro Sula
28 November 1992

Real España (Honduras)	5–0	(Belize) La Victoria

15 November 1992

Suchitepéquez (Guatemala)	4–2	(Nicaragua) Bautista

22 November 1992

Bautista (Nicaragua)	1–1	(Guatemala) Suchitepéquez

- Luis Ángel Firpo received a bye.

=== Caribbean Zone ===
==== First round ====
10 November 1992

Solidarité-Scolaire (Guadeloupe)	5–0	(Antigua and Barbuda) Lion Hill Spliff

Played over one leg only.

Solidarité-Scolaire qualified for Next Round

11 November 1992

Javouhey Mana (French Guiana)	0–0	(Suriname) PVV

22 November 1992

PVV (Suriname)	4–0	(French Guiana) Javouhey Mana

PVV qualified for Next Round

==== Second round ====
16 December 1992

Solidarité-Scolaire (Guadeloupe)	2–2	(Suriname) PVV

23 December 1992

PVV (Suriname)	1–1 (3–5 pen.)	(Guadeloupe) Solidarité-Scolaire

Solidarité-Scolaire qualified for Next Round

16 December 1992

Robert (Martinique)	w/o	(Cayman Islands) Yobbo Rangers

23 December 1992

Yobbo Rangers (Cayman Islands)	w/o	(Martinique) Robert

Yobbo Rangers withdrew before 1st leg.

Robert qualified for Next Round

==== Third round ====
6 January 1993

Robert (Martinique)	4–1	(Guadeloupe) Solidarité-Scolaire

20 January 1993

Solidarité-Scolaire (Guadeloupe)	2–0	(Martinique) Robert

Robert qualified for Next Round

== Northern/Caribbean play-off ==
10 February 1993

Robert (Martinique)	2–1	(Mexico) Monterrey
Marie Luce 16'; Robert Bounge 66'		o.g. 70'

10 March 1993

Monterrey (Mexico)	2–0 (a.e.t.)	(Martinique) Robert
Juan Antonio Flores Barrera 60', 92'

Monterrey qualified for Final Round

== Final round ==
Pos	Team	Pld	W	D	L	GF	GA	GD	Pts	
1	(Mexico) Monterrey	3	2	1	0	7	4	+3	5	1993 CONCACAF Cup Winners Cup champions
2	(Honduras) Real España	3	1	2	0	9	1	+8	4	
3	(El Salvador) Luis Ángel Firpo	3	1	1	1	9	5	+4	3	
4	(Guatemala) Suchitepéquez	3	0	0	3	1	16	−15	0	

28 July 1993 Round 1	Monterrey (Mexico)	1–1	(Honduras) Real España	Monterey Park, United States
(UTC−08:00)	Gerardo Jiménez 75'		Eduardo Sato 58'	Stadium: East Los Angeles College Stadium

28 July 1993 Round 1	Luis Ángel Firpo (El Salvador)	6–1	(Guatemala) Suchitepéquez	Monterey Park, United States
(UTC−08:00)				Stadium: East Los Angeles College Stadium

30 July 1993 Round 2	Luis Ángel Firpo (El Salvador)	0–0	(Honduras) Real España	Monterey Park, United States
(UTC−08:00)				Stadium: East Los Angeles College Stadium

30 July 1993 Round 2	Monterrey (Mexico)	2–0	(Guatemala) Suchitepéquez	Monterey Park, United States
(UTC−08:00)	Carlos Bianchezi 79'; Edgar Plascencia 87'			Stadium: East Los Angeles College Stadium

1 August 1993 Round 3	Real España (Honduras)	8–0	(Guatemala) Suchitepéquez	Monterey Park, United States
(UTC−08:00)				Stadium: East Los Angeles College Stadium

1 August 1993 Round 3	Luis Ángel Firpo (El Salvador)	3–4	(Mexico) Monterrey	Monterey Park, United States
(UTC−08:00)	Raúl Toro Basáez 30' (pen.) 53' (pen.); Celio Rodríguez 60'		Sergio Verdirame 18' 63'; Gerardo Jiménez 67'; Luis Hernández 73'	Stadium: East Los Angeles College Stadium

== Champion ==
CONCACAF Cup Winners' Cup
1993 Champion
(Mexico)
Monterrey
First title
