= Julio César Uribe =

Peruvian footballer and manager (born 1958)

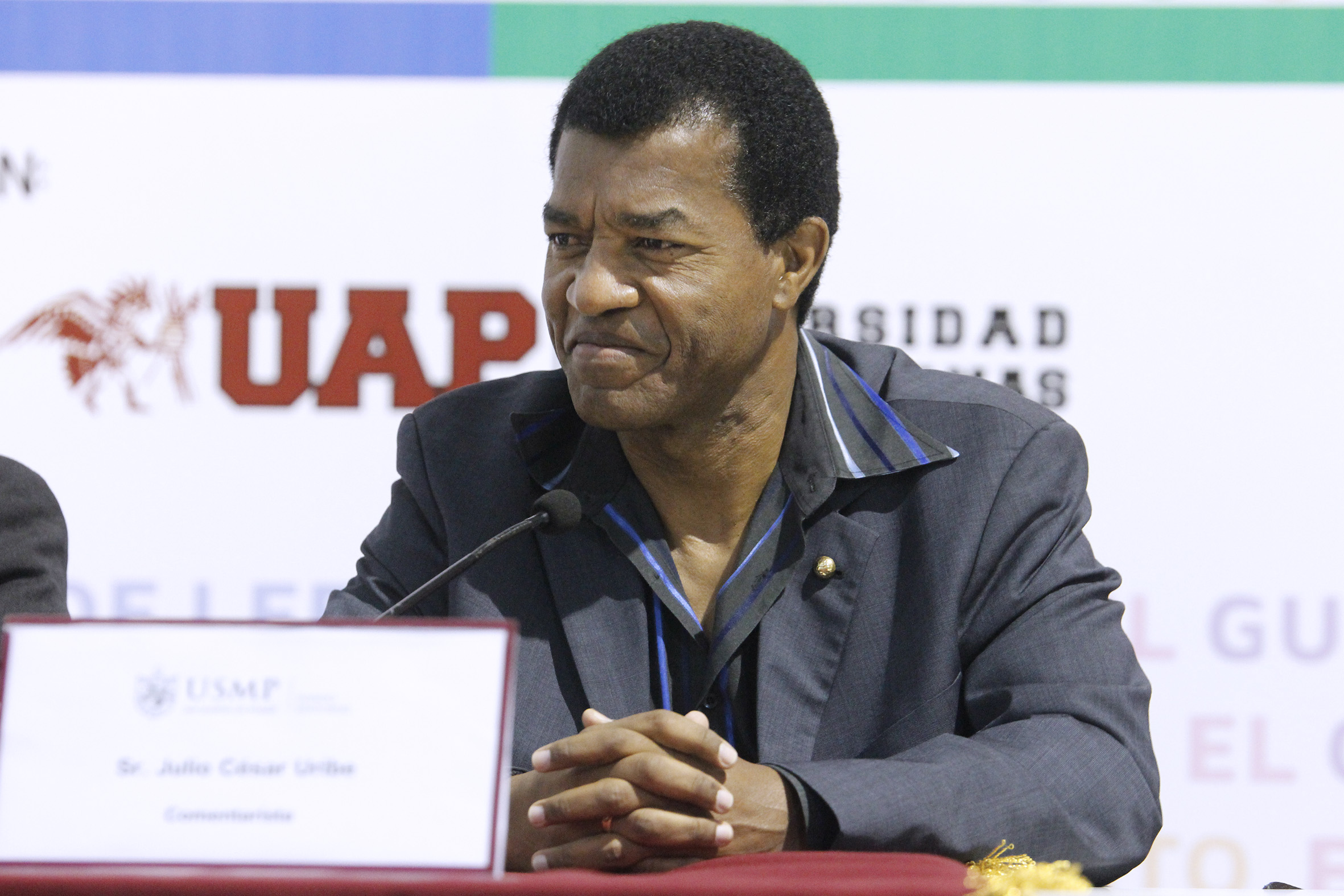

Personal information
- Full name: Julio César Uribe Flores
- Date of birth: 9 May 1958 (age 68)
- Place of birth: Lima, Peru
- Height: 1.72 m (5 ft 7 1/2 in)
- Positions: Attacking midfielder; second striker

Youth career
- 1969–1975: Sporting Cristal

Senior career*
Years	Team	Apps	(Gls)
1975–1982	Sporting Cristal		
1982–1985	Cagliari	69	(11)
1985	Sporting Cristal		
1986	Atlético Junior	38	(16)
1987	América de Cali	11	(6)
1987–1988	América	16	(8)
1988	Sporting Cristal		
1989	América de Cali	20	(6)
1989-1991	Tecos UAG	29	(11)
1991	Sporting Cristal		
1992	Independiente Medellín	20	(0)
1992	Envigado		
1994	Mannucci		

International career
1979–1989	Peru	39	(9)

Managerial career
- 1992–1994: Mannucci
- 1995: Deportivo Municipal
- 1995: Alianza Lima
- 1996: Tecos UAG
- 1996–1997: Atlético Junior
- 1998: Yunnan Hongta
- 1998: Juan Aurich
- 1998: Tecos UAG
- 2000: Peru U-20
- 2000–2002: Peru
- 2002: Tecos UAG
- 2004: Tecos UAG
- 2006–2007: Cienciano
- 2007: Peru
- 2008–2009: Cienciano
- 2010: José Gálvez
- 2011–2012: Unión Comercio
- 2013–2014: Universidad de San Martín
- 2017: Unión Comercio
- 2017: San José
- 2017: Juan Aurich
- 2021: Alianza Universidad
- * Club domestic league appearances and goals

Julio César Uribe Flores (born May 9, 1958) is a Peruvian football manager and former player who played as an attacking midfielder or a second striker.

== Playing career ==
=== Club ===
Uribe started his career with Peruvian club Sporting Cristal. Luigi Riva convinced him to come to Italy, to Cagliari Calcio, where he played for three seasons from 1982 to 1985.

After his time in Italy, Uribe returned to Sporting Cristal. He then played the following seasons with several clubs in Colombia and Mexico such as Club América. He returned to Peru in his last season as footballer to retire with C.A. Mannucci in 1994.

=== International ===
During his playing days, from 1979 to 1989, he earned 39 caps and scored 9 goals for the Peruvian national team

== Managerial career ==
Uribe has managed numerous teams, primarily in Peru and Mexico. He won the CONCACAF Cup Winners Cup with Tecos in 1995. He managed the club on several occasions, saving them from relegation twice. With Cienciano, he reached the final of the 2006 Peruvian Championship, which they lost to Alianza Lima (1-0 and 1-3).

In 2000, he replaced Francisco Maturana as manager of the Peruvian national team. He led Peru to the quarterfinals of the 2001 Copa América. Six years later, he returned to manage Peru, guiding them once again to the quarterfinals of the 2007 Copa América.

== Career statistics ==
=== International goals ===
Scores and results table. Peru's goal tally first:

List of international goals scored by Julio César Uribe
No.	Date	Venue	Opponent	Score	Result	Competition
1.	12 November 1980	Estadio Nacional, Lima, Peru	Uruguay	1–0	1–1	Friendly
2.	4 February 1981	Estadio Nacional, Lima, Peru	Czech Republic	1–2	1–3	Friendly
3.	16 August 1981	Estadio Nacional, Lima, Peru	Colombia	2–0	2–0	1982 FIFA World Cup qualification
4.	23 August 1981	Estadio Centenario, Montevideo, Uruguay	Uruguay	2–0	2–1	1982 FIFA World Cup qualification
5.	18 April 1982	Népstadion, Budapest, Hungary	Hungary	1–1	2–1	Friendly
6.	18 April 1982	Népstadion, Budapest, Hungary	Hungary	2–1	2–1	Friendly
7.	16 May 1982	Estadio Nacional, Lima, Peru	Romania	1–0	2–0	Friendly
8.	28 April 1985	Estádio Mané Garrincha, Brasília, Brazil	Brazil	1–0	1–0	Friendly
9.	2 June 1985	Estadio Polideportivo de Pueblo Nuevo, San Cristóbal, Venezuela	Venezuela	1–0	1–0	1986 FIFA World Cup qualification

== Honours ==
=== Player ===
Sporting Cristal

- Peruvian League (4): 1979, 1980, 1988, 1991

Club América

- Mexican Primera División (1): 1987-88

=== Manager ===
Tecos

- CONCACAF Cup Winners Cup (1): 1995
