= 2000 UNCAF Interclub Cup =

Tournament details
- Dates: 15 January–5 November 2000
- Teams: 12 (from 7 associations)

Final positions
- Champions: (Honduras) Olimpia (3rd title)
- Runners-up: (Costa Rica) Alajuelense
- Third place: (Honduras) Real España
- Fourth place: (Guatemala) Municipal

Tournament statistics
- Matches played: 40
- Goals scored: 127 (3.18 per match)

The 2000 UNCAF Interclub Cup was the 18th edition of the Central American Club Championship, and the second under the name UNCAF Interclub Cup. The tournament was organized by UNCAF, the football regional body in Central America.

Honduran club Olimpia won the final round to obtain their third tournament in team's history. The tournament also served as a qualification to the 2000 CONCACAF Champions' Cup.

== First round ==
=== Group 1 ===
| Pos | Team | Pld | W | D | L | GF | GA | GD | Pts | Qualification |
|---|---|---|---|---|---|---|---|---|---|---|
| 1 | (Costa Rica) Alajuelense | 4 | 3 | 1 | 0 | 10 | 2 | +8 | 10 | Qualification for Second Round |
| 2 | (Honduras) Real España | 4 | 2 | 1 | 1 | 11 | 3 | +8 | 7 | Qualification for Second Round |
| 3 | (Nicaragua) Real Estelí | 4 | 0 | 0 | 4 | 2 | 18 | −16 | 0 | |

2000-02-03

| Alajuelense (Costa Rica) | 6 - 0 | (Nicaragua) Real Estelí |
|---|---|---|
| Edson Valente 3'; Luis Marin 39'; Harold Miranda 60'; Alexander Castro 73'; Alejandro Alpizar 80'; Pablo Izaguirre 87' |

Estadio Alejandro Morera Soto, Alajuela

2000-02-13

| Real Estelí (Nicaragua) | 1 - 2 | (Costa Rica) Alajuelense |
|---|---|---|
| Carlos Alonso 83pen | | Heriberto Quiros 18' 42' |

Estadio Independencia, Estelí

2000-02-27

| Real España (Honduras) | 2 - 1 | (Nicaragua) Real Estelí |
|---|---|---|
| Luis Ramírez 64'; Nelson Vera 28' | | Selvin Alvarez 48' |

Estadio Francisco Morazán, San Pedro Sula
Attendance: 2,634

2000-03-02

| Alajuelense (Costa Rica) | 1 - 0 | (Honduras) Real España |
|---|---|---|
| Wilmer Lopez 15pen | | Nil |

Estadio Alejandro Morera Soto, Alajuela

2000-03-15

| Real España (Honduras) | 1 - 1 | (Costa Rica) Alajuelense |
|---|---|---|
| Carlos Oliva 33' | | Pablo Alejandro Izaguirre 71' |

Estadio Francisco Morazán, San Pedro Sula

2000-03-27

| Real Estelí (Nicaragua) | 0 - 8 | (Honduras) Real España |
|---|---|---|
| Nil | | Edgar Delgado 4'; David Cárcamo 8'; Jose Maria Rolon 36' 78'; Ricardo Alcerro 47'; Nelson Vera 50' 52' 83' |

Estadio Independencia, Estelí

=== Group 2 ===
| Pos | Team | Pld | W | D | L | GF | GA | GD | Pts | Qualification |
|---|---|---|---|---|---|---|---|---|---|---|
| 1 | (Costa Rica) Saprissa | 4 | 3 | 0 | 1 | 8 | 3 | +5 | 9 | Qualification for Second Round |
| 2 | (Panama) Panamá Viejo | 4 | 2 | 0 | 2 | 5 | 10 | −5 | 6 | Qualification for Second Round |
| 3 | (El Salvador) Alianza | 4 | 1 | 0 | 3 | 9 | 9 | 0 | 3 | |

2000-02-10

| Panamá Viejo (Panama) | 2 - 0 | (El Salvador) Alianza |
|---|---|---|
| Marco Aparicio 71'; Edmundo Gomez 2' |

Estadio Javier Cruz, Panama City

2000-02-12

| Saprissa (Costa Rica) | 3 - 1 | (El Salvador) Alianza |
|---|---|---|
| Farlen Ilama 1'; Johnny Murillo 52'; Vicente Rosella 86' | | Agnaldo De Oliveira 49' |

Estadio Ricardo Saprissa Aymá, San José

2000-02-17

| Alianza (El Salvador) | 7 - 2 | Panama Viejo |
|---|---|---|
| Agnaldo De Oliveira 2' 63' 73' 88'; Adonays Martinez 13' 82'; Roberto Da Silva 73' | | Victor Herrera Piggott 29pen Marco Aparicio 85' |

Estadio Cuscatlán, San Salvador

2000-02-19

| Saprissa (Costa Rica) | 3 - 0 | Panama Viejo |
|---|---|---|
| Adrian Mahia 35'; Vicente Rosella 47'; Farlen Ilama 84' |

Estadio Ricardo Saprissa Aymá, San José

2000-02-24

| Alianza (El Salvador) | 1 - 2 | (Costa Rica) Saprissa |
|---|---|---|
| Cecilio Galeano 64' | | Gustavo Martinez 6pen Steven Bryce 19' |

Estadio Cuscatlán, San Salvador

2000-03-02

| Panamá Viejo (Panama) | 1 - 0 | (Costa Rica) Saprissa |
|---|---|---|
| Ricardo Phillips |

Estadio Javier Cruz, Panama City

=== Group 3 ===
| Pos | Team | Pld | W | D | L | GF | GA | GD | Pts | Qualification |
|---|---|---|---|---|---|---|---|---|---|---|
| 1 | (Guatemala) Comunicaciones | 4 | 2 | 1 | 1 | 6 | 3 | +3 | 7 | Qualification for Second Round |
| 2 | (Panama) Arabe Unido | 4 | 2 | 1 | 1 | 5 | 4 | +1 | 7 | Qualification for Second Round |
| 3 | (Belize) Sagitun | 4 | 0 | 2 | 2 | 5 | 9 | −4 | 2 | |

2000-01-15

| Sagitun (Belize) | 1 - 1 | (Guatemala) Comunicaciones |
|---|---|---|
| Oliver Hendricks 68' | | Ronald Gonzalez 18' |

Michael Ashcroft Stadium, Independence and Mango Creek

2000-02-03

| Comunicaciones (Guatemala) | 4 - 1 | (Belize) Sagitun |
|---|---|---|
| Manuel Callen 28'; Ricardo Arenas 31'; Oscar Samayoa 55' 72' | | Benedict López 17' |

Estadio Cementos Progreso, Guatemala City

2000-02-05

| Arabe Unido (Panama) | 2 - 1 | (Belize) Sagitun |
|---|---|---|
| Jairo Cadena 12' 42' | | Deris Benavides 77' |

Estadio Armando Dely Valdés, Colón

2000-03-02

| Arabe Unido (Panama) | 1 - 0 | (Guatemala) Comunicaciones |
|---|---|---|
| Julio Medina 88' | | Nil |

Estadio Rommel Fernández, Panama City

2000-03-09

| Comunicaciones (Guatemala) | 1 - 0 | (Panama) Arabe Unido |
|---|---|---|
| Jorge Perez 5pen | | Nil |

Estadio Cementos Progreso, Guatemala City

2000-03-12

| Sagitun (Belize) | 2 - 2 | (Panama) Arabe Unido |
|---|---|---|
| Benedict Lopez 56'; Bent Burgess 68pen | | Jaime Cadena 14'; Alberto Cerezo 44' |

Michael Ashcroft Stadium, Independence and Mango Creek

=== Group 4 ===
| Pos | Team | Pld | W | D | L | GF | GA | GD | Pts | Qualification |
|---|---|---|---|---|---|---|---|---|---|---|
| 1 | (Guatemala) Municipal | 3 | 3 | 0 | 0 | 10 | 3 | +7 | 9 | Qualification for Second Round |
| 2 | (Honduras) Olimpia | 3 | 2 | 0 | 1 | 5 | 3 | +2 | 6 | Qualification for Second Round |
| 3 | (Belize) La Victoria | 4 | 0 | 0 | 4 | 1 | 10 | −9 | 0 | |

2000-01-20

| La Victoria (Belize) | 0 - 1 | (Guatemala) Municipal |
|---|---|---|
| | | Rudy Ramirez 74' |

Ricalde Stadium, Corozal Town

2000-01-27

| Municipal (Guatemala) | 6 - 1 | (Belize) La Victoria |
|---|---|---|
| Guillermo Ramirez 4' 87'; Rolando Benitez 25' 52'; Rudy Ramirez 55pen, 86pen | | Cesario Rosales 85' |

Estadio Mateo Flores, Guatemala City

2000-03-13

| La Victoria (Belize) | 0 - 3 | (Honduras) Olimpia |
|---|---|---|
| | | Wilmer Velásquez 6'; Danilo Tosello 24' 45' |

Ricalde Stadium, Corozal Town

2000-03-15

| Olimpia (Honduras) | forfeit | (Belize) La Victoria |

Estadio Tiburcio Carías Andino, Tegucigalpa

La Victoria did not show, Olimpia was awarded the win

2000-03-23

| Olimpia (Honduras) | 2 - 3 | (Guatemala) Municipal |
|---|---|---|
| Danilo Tosello 14pen Eduardo Arriola 78' | | Rudy Ramirez 20'; Carlos Gonzalez 30'; Juan Carlos Plata 62' |

Estadio Tiburcio Carías Andino, Tegucigalpa

2000-03-30

| Municipal (Guatemala) | canceled | (Honduras) Olimpia |

Estadio Mateo Flores, Guatemala City

== Second round ==
=== Group A ===
| Pos | Team | Pld | W | D | L | GF | GA | GD | Pts | Qualification |
|---|---|---|---|---|---|---|---|---|---|---|
| 1 | (Guatemala) Municipal | 3 | 1 | 2 | 0 | 6 | 1 | +5 | 5 | Qualification for Final Round |
| 2 | (Honduras) Olimpia | 3 | 1 | 1 | 1 | 6 | 4 | +2 | 4 | Qualification for Final Round |
| 3 | (Costa Rica) Saprissa | 3 | 1 | 1 | 1 | 5 | 3 | +2 | 4 | |
| 4 | (Panama) Panamá Viejo | 3 | 1 | 0 | 2 | 1 | 10 | −9 | 3 | |

2000-08-02

| Municipal (Guatemala) | 1 - 1 | (Costa Rica) Saprissa |
|---|---|---|
| Selvin Ponciano 89' | | Gerald Drummond 85' |

Estadio Mateo Flores, Guatemala City

2000-08-02

| Olimpia (Honduras) | 5 - 0 | Panama Viejo |
|---|---|---|
| Fabio Ulloa 17'; Denilson Costa 48'; Wilmer Velasquez 82' 87'; Alex Pineda 89' |

Estadio Mateo Flores, Guatemala City

2000-08-04

| Municipal (Guatemala) | 0 - 0 | (Honduras) Olimpia |

Estadio Mateo Flores, Guatemala City

2000-08-04

| Panama Viejo | 1 - 0 | (Costa Rica) Saprissa |
|---|---|---|
| Anel Canales 78' |

Estadio Mateo Flores, Guatemala City

2000-08-06

| Olimpia (Honduras) | 1 - 4 | (Costa Rica) Saprissa |
|---|---|---|
| Danilo Tosello 10pen | | Jervis Drummond 22'; Victor Cordero 29'; Randall Row 62pen Walter Centeno 82' |

Estadio Mateo Flores, Guatemala City

2000-08-06

| Municipal (Guatemala) | 5 - 0 | Panama Viejo |
|---|---|---|
| Juan Carlos Plata 3' 46'; Gonzalo Romero 13'; Mario Acevedo 21'; Rudy Ramirez 90' | | Nil |

Estadio Mateo Flores, Guatemala City

=== Group B ===
| Pos | Team | Pld | W | D | L | GF | GA | GD | Pts | Qualification |
|---|---|---|---|---|---|---|---|---|---|---|
| 1 | (Costa Rica) Alajuelense | 3 | 3 | 0 | 0 | 6 | 3 | +3 | 9 | Qualification for Final Round |
| 2 | (Honduras) Real España | 3 | 2 | 0 | 1 | 4 | 3 | +1 | 6 | Qualification for Final Round |
| 3 | (Panama) Árabe Unido | 3 | 1 | 0 | 2 | 7 | 8 | −1 | 3 | |
| 4 | (Guatemala) Comunicaciones | 3 | 0 | 0 | 3 | 5 | 8 | −3 | 0 | |

2000-08-23

| Alajuelense (Costa Rica) | 2 - 1 | (Guatemala) Comunicaciones |
|---|---|---|
| Claudio Ciccia 69'; Pablo Chinchilla 84' | | Rolando Fonseca 63' |

Estadio Rommel Fernández, Panama City

2000-08-23

| Arabe Unido (Panama) | 1 - 2 | (Honduras) Real España |
|---|---|---|
| Jairo Cadena 85pen | | Carlos Oliva 13'; Luis Ramirez 78' |

Estadio Rommel Fernández, Panama City

2000-08-25

| Arabe Unido (Panama) | 2 - 3 | (Costa Rica) Alajuelense |
|---|---|---|
| Jairo Cadena 19'; Julio Medina 59' | | Claudio Ciccia 23' 31'; Javier Delgado 48pen |

Estadio Rommel Fernández, Panama City

2000-08-25

| Comunicaciones (Guatemala) | 1 - 2 | (Honduras) Real España |
|---|---|---|
| Claudio Rojas 87' | | Gustavo Gallegos 25'; Walter Caprille 27' |

Estadio Rommel Fernández, Panama City

2000-08-27

| Alajuelense (Costa Rica) | 1 - 0 | (Honduras) Real España |
|---|---|---|
| Javier Delgado 87pen |

Estadio Rommel Fernández, Panama City

2000-08-27

| Arabe Unido (Panama) | 4 - 3 | (Guatemala) Comunicaciones |
|---|---|---|
| Jairo Cadena 30'; Marcelo Saraiva 44og Julio Medina 75'; Alberto Cerezo 88' | | Dwight Pezzarossi 3' 34'; Julio Rodas 77' |

Estadio Rommel Fernández, Panama City

== Final round ==
=== Final Group ===
| Pos | Team | Pld | W | D | L | GF | GA | GD | Pts | Qualification |
|---|---|---|---|---|---|---|---|---|---|---|
| 1 | (Honduras) Olimpia (C) | 3 | 1 | 2 | 0 | 2 | 0 | +2 | 5 | Qualification for CONCACAF Champions' Cup 2000 |
| 2 | (Costa Rica) Alajuelense | 3 | 1 | 2 | 0 | 2 | 1 | +1 | 5 | Qualification for CONCACAF Champions' Cup 2000 |
| 3 | (Honduras) Real España | 3 | 1 | 1 | 1 | 4 | 5 | −1 | 4 | Qualification for CONCACAF Champions' Cup 2000 |
| 4 | (Guatemala) Municipal | 3 | 0 | 1 | 2 | 2 | 4 | −2 | 1 | |

(C) Champions
2000-11-01

| Real España (Honduras) | 1 - 1 | (Costa Rica) Alajuelense |
|---|---|---|
| Marlon Hernandez 33' | | Heriberto Quiros 14' |

Estadio Olímpico Metropolitano, San Pedro Sula

2000-11-01

| Olimpia (Honduras) | 0 - 0 | (Guatemala) Municipal |

Estadio Olímpico Metropolitano, San Pedro Sula

2000-11-03

| Real España (Honduras) | 0 - 2 | (Honduras) Olimpia |
|---|---|---|
| | | Luis Oseguera 49'; Wilmer Velasquez 73' |

Estadio Olímpico Metropolitano, San Pedro Sula

2000-11-03

| Alajuelense (Costa Rica) | 1 - 0 | (Guatemala) Municipal |
|---|---|---|
| Luis Marin 55' |

Estadio Olímpico Metropolitano, San Pedro Sula

2000-11-05

| Olimpia (Honduras) | 0 - 0 | (Costa Rica) Alajuelense |

Estadio Olímpico Metropolitano, San Pedro Sula

2000-11-05

| Real España (Honduras) | 3 - 2 | (Guatemala) Municipal |
|---|---|---|
| Mario Orta 3' 30' 56' | | Juan Carlos Plata 35' 45' |

Estadio Olímpico Metropolitano, San Pedro Sula

Olimpia, Alajuelense, and Real España qualify to CONCACAF Champions' Cup 2000

Copa Interclubes UNCAF 2000 champions
Olimpia
3rd title
