= 1965 CONCACAF Champions' Cup =

Tournament details
- Dates: 3 October 1965 – 31 March 1966
- Teams: 12 (from 12 federation)

Final positions
- Champions: Not awarded

Tournament statistics
- Matches played: 13
- Goals scored: 34 (2.62 per match)

The 1965 CONCACAF Champions' Cup was originally to be the 3rd edition of the annual international club football competition held in the CONCACAF region (North America, Central America and the Caribbean), the CONCACAF Champions' Cup. It determined that year's club champion of association football in the CONCACAF region.

The tournament was played by 12 teams of 12 nations: Costa Rica, El Salvador, Guatemala, Honduras, Nicaragua, Panama, Jamaica, Haiti, Cuba, Netherlands Antilles, Dutch Guiana, Trinidad and Tobago. The tournament was played from 3 October 1965 till 31 March 1966.

The teams were split in 3 zones (North American, Central American and Caribbean), each one qualifying the winner to the final tournament, where the winners of the North and Central zones played a semi-final to decide who was going to play against the Caribbean champion in the final. All the matches in the tournament were played under the home/away match system.

No champion was crowned for the second consecutive year since the final of the tournament could not be held: the tournament was declared void.

== North American Zone ==
The Zone was scratched because no club entered.

== Central American Zone ==
=== First round ===
3 October 1965 1st leg	Águila (El Salvador)	4–1	(Guatemala) Aurora	San Miguel, El Salvador
	Sergio Mendez; Juan Francisco Barraza; Walter Pearson		Carlos Herrera	Stadium: Estadio Juan Francisco Barraza

10 October 1965 2nd leg	Aurora (Guatemala)	1–2 (2–6 agg.)	(El Salvador) Águila	Guatemala City, Guatemala
	Corán		Sergio Mendez; Walter Pearson

3 October 1965 1st leg	Santa Cecilia (Nicaragua)	2–1	(Honduras) Olimpia	Managua, Nicaragua

10 October 1965 2nd leg	Olimpia (Honduras)	3–0 (4–2 agg.)	(Nicaragua) Santa Cecilia	Tegucigalpa, Honduras
				Stadium: Estadio Nacional

17 October 1965 1st leg	Unión Española (Panama)	1–1	(Costa Rica) Saprissa	Panama City, Panama

5 November 1965 2nd leg	Saprissa (Costa Rica)	8–0 (9–1 agg.)	(Panama) Unión Española	San José, Costa Rica

=== Second round ===
(Costa Rica) Saprissa received a bye to the third round

25 October 1965 1st leg	Águila (El Salvador)	4–2	(Honduras) Olimpia	San Miguel, El Salvador
	Sergio Mendez; Walter Pearson			Stadium: Estadio Juan Francisco Barraza

31 October 1965 2nd leg	Olimpia (Honduras)	1–0 (3–4 agg.)	(El Salvador) Águila	Tegucigalpa, Honduras
				Stadium: Estadio Nacional

=== Third round ===
27 March 1966 1st leg	Águila (El Salvador)	1–2	(Costa Rica) Saprissa	San Salvador, El Salvador
	Walter Pearson		Fernando Hernández; Eduardo Umaña

31 March 1966 2nd leg	Saprissa (Costa Rica)	0–0 (2–1 agg.)	(El Salvador) Águila	San José, Costa Rica

== Caribbean Zone ==
=== First round ===
==== Group A ====
All matches were scheduled to be held in Willemstad, Netherlands Antilles from 13 December to 17 December 1965, but were cancelled.

Team 1	Score	Team 2
Railways (Jamaica)	Cancelled	(Cuba) Industriales
Aigle Noir (Haiti)	Cancelled	(Jamaica) Railways
Industriales (Cuba)	Cancelled	(Haiti) Aigle Noir

==== Group B ====
All matches were scheduled to be held in Oranjestad, Netherlands Antilles from 13 December to 17 December 1965, but were cancelled.

Team 1	Score	Team 2
Paragon (Trinidad and Tobago)	Cancelled	(Suriname (Kingdom of the Netherlands)) Transvaal
Transvaal (Suriname (Kingdom of the Netherlands))	Cancelled	(Netherlands Antilles) RCA
RCA (Netherlands Antilles)	Cancelled	(Trinidad and Tobago) Paragon

=== Second round ===
The match was scheduled to take place on December 19, 1965 in Willemstad, Netherlands Antilles, but was cancelled.

Team 1	Score	Team 2
Group A Winner	Cancelled	Group B Winner

== Final ==
Team 1	Agg.	Team 2	1st leg	2nd leg
Saprissa (Costa Rica)	w/o	Caribbean Zone Winner		

Due to the Caribbean Zone tournament's cancellation and no club entering the North American Zone, the tournament was cancelled.
