= 1964 CONCACAF Champions' Cup =

Tournament details
- Dates: 20 September – 15 December
- Teams: 11 (from 10 federation)

Final positions
- Champions: Not awarded

Tournament statistics
- Matches played: 13
- Goals scored: 41 (3.15 per match)

The 1964 CONCACAF Champions' Cup was originally to be the 3rd edition of the annual international club football competition held in the CONCACAF region (North America, Central America and the Caribbean), the CONCACAF Champions' Cup. It determined that year's club champion of association football in the CONCACAF region.

The tournament was played by 11 teams of 10 nations: Mexico, United States, Costa Rica, El Salvador, Guatemala, Honduras, Netherlands Antilles, Haiti, Dutch Guiana, Trinidad and Tobago. The tournament was played from 20 September till 15 December 1964.

The teams were split in 3 zones (North American, Central American and Caribbean), each one qualifying the winner to the final tournament, where the winners of the North and Central zones played a semi-final to decide who was going to play against the Caribbean champion in the final. All the matches in the tournament were played under the home/away match system.

No champion was crowned as the final of the tournament could not be held: the tournament was declared void.

== North American Zone ==
=== First round ===
Team 1	Agg.	Team 2	1st leg	2nd leg
América (Mexico)	w/o	(United States) Ukrainian Nationals		

América withdrew from the tournament, Ukrainian Nationals advanced.

=== Second round ===
Team 1	Agg.	Team 2	1st leg	2nd leg
Guadalajara (Mexico)	w/o	(United States) Ukrainian Nationals		

Guadalajara withdrew from the tournament, Ukrainian Nationals advanced and were drawn into the Caribbean zone.

== Central American Zone ==
=== First round ===
20 September 1964 1st leg	Águila (El Salvador)	1–2	(Guatemala) Municipal	San Miguel, El Salvador
				Stadium: Estadio Juan Francisco Barraza

27 September 1964 2nd leg	Municipal (Guatemala)	1–2	(El Salvador) Águila	Guatemala City, Guatemala
				Stadium: Estadio Doroteo Guamuch Flores

11 October 1964 Replay	Municipal (Guatemala)	2–1 (5–4 agg.)	(El Salvador) Águila	Guatemala City, Guatemala
	Ricardo Clark		René Mena	Stadium: Estadio Doroteo Guamuch Flores

26 September 1964 1st leg	Olimpia (Honduras)	0–2	(Costa Rica) Uruguay de Coronado	Tegucigalpa, Honduras
			Tarcicio Rodríguez; Eduardo Chavarrí	Stadium: Estadio Nacional

27 September 1964 2nd leg	Uruguay de Coronado (Costa Rica)	2–1 (4–1 agg.)	(Honduras) Olimpia	Tegucigalpa, Honduras
	Ricardo Taylor			Stadium: Estadio Nacional

=== Second round ===
1 November 1964	Municipal (Guatemala)	1–3	(Costa Rica) Uruguay de Coronado	Mazatenango, Guatemala
				Stadium: Estadio Carlos Salazar Hijo

4 November 1964	Uruguay de Coronado (Costa Rica)	2-1 (5-2 agg.)	(Guatemala) Municipal	San José, Costa Rica
	Eduardo Chavarría 5' 72'			Stadium: Estadio Nacional de Costa Rica

== Caribbean Zone ==
=== First round ===
24 September 1964 1st leg	YMCA (Jamaica)	1–2	(Cuba) Industriales

29 September 1964 2nd leg	Industriales (Cuba)	4–2 (6–3 agg.)	(Jamaica) YMCA

24 September 1964 1st leg	Maple (Trinidad and Tobago)	4–1	(Suriname (Kingdom of the Netherlands)) Leo Victor	Port of Spain, Trinidad and Tobago
	TBD; TBD; TBD; TBD		TBD

1 October 1964 2nd leg	Leo Victor (Suriname (Kingdom of the Netherlands))	4–0 (5–4 agg.)	(Trinidad and Tobago) Maple	Paramaribo, Suriname
	TBD; TBD; TBD; TBD		Nil

8 October 1964 1st leg	Aigle Noir (Haiti)	4–1	(Netherlands Antilles) Veendam	Port-au-Prince, Haiti
	TBD; TBD; TBD; TBD		TBD

10 October 1964 2nd leg	Veendam (Netherlands Antilles)	2–2 (3–6 agg.)	(Haiti) Aigle Noir	Port-au-Prince, Haiti
	TBD; TBD \		TBD; TBD

=== Second round ===
Ukrainian Nationals (United States)	n/a	(Cuba) Industriales

- Both clubs withdrew.

1 December 1964 1st leg	Leo Victor (Suriname (Kingdom of the Netherlands))	2–1	(Haiti) Aigle Noir

15 December 1964 2nd leg	Aigle Noir (Haiti)	1–1 (2–3 agg.)	(Suriname (Kingdom of the Netherlands)) Leo Victor

== Final ==
Team 1	Agg.	Team 2	1st leg	2nd leg
Leo Victor (Suriname (Kingdom of the Netherlands))	w/o	(Costa Rica) Uruguay de Coronado		

Both teams withdrew from the tournament.
