= List of C.F. Monterrey seasons =

The following is a list of seasons played by C.F. Monterrey in Liga MX and other association football competitions from the 1945–46 season to the present. Friendlies are excluded. It is the seventh club in the league with the most consecutive seasons played.

C.F. Monterrey was founded on 28 June 1945, near the end of World War II by a group of industrial businessmen headed by Ramón Cárdenas Coronado, Enrique Ayala Medina, Paul C. Probert, Rogelio Cantú Gómez and Miguel Margáín Zozaya. The team's nickname was popularly accepted, after the team's uniform, which is traditionally white with navy blue vertical stripes. Although the original uniform was white with a diagonal blue upper shoulder, the stripes were inspired in 1965, when the Tampico Madero (nicknamed "Jaibas Bravas", or Brave crabs) football team wore them, and the Monterrey team adopted them. Since then, the home uniform consists of vertical blue and white striped jerseys with blue shorts.

Monterrey's debut took place on August 19, 1945, with a 1-0 victory over the San Sebastián Saints at Cuauhtémoc Baseball Park in León, Guanajuato. The first goal in the club's history was scored by Spanish-Argentine José "Che" Gómez. This would be the birth of football the state of Nuevo León, where baseball was the most popular sport.

Monterrey has won the Liga MX five times, the Copa México three times, the CONCACAF Champions League five times, and the CONCACAF Cup Winners Cup once. Since the format change in 2008, it was the first club to win the CONCACAF League three times in a row (2011-2012-2013). In 2020, became the second Mexican club to complete the continental treble.

== Key ==
Key to colors and symbols:

1st or W	Winners
2nd or RU	Runners-up
3rd	Third place
Last	Last place
Qual. Elimination round	From 4th place (Note: Generally, the teams that finish in the top eight of the standings table advance to the Liguilla; however, there have been occasions when a team has qualified from below eighth place.)
♦	League top scorer

To league record:

- Pld = Played
- W = Games won
- D = Games drawn
- L = Games lost
- GF = Goals for
- GA = Goals against
- Pts = Points
- Pos = Final position

Key to rounds:

- GS = Group stage
- R16 = Round of 16
- QF = Quarter-finals
- SF = Semi-finals
- RU = Runners-up
- W = Winners

== Seasons ==
Season	League (Note: Since the Torneo Apertura 2012, the tournament has been known under its current name, "Liga MX.")								Position		National Cups		Continental / Other		Tournament Top goalscorer(s)	
Season	Competition	Pld	W	D	L	GF	GA	Pts	Pos	Play-offs (Note: Known in Mexico as Liguilla.)	National Cups		Continental / Other		Name(s)	Goals
1945–46	Primera División	30	5	4	21	58	133	14	16th	—	COPAMX	R16	—	—		
1946–47	The club had no participation.															
1947–48	The club had no participation.															
1948–49	The club had no participation.															
1949–50	The club had no participation.															
1950–51	The club had no participation.															
1951–52	The club had no participation.															
1952–53	Segunda División	22	5	2	15	30	45	12	12th	—	—	—	—	—		
1953–54	Segunda División	22	5	2	15	23	44	12	12th	—	—	—	—	—		
1954–55	Segunda División	26	10	6	10	31	40	26	9th	—	—	—	—	—		
1955–56	Segunda División	24	13	8	3	42	31	34	1st	W	—	—	—	—		
1956–57	Primera División	24	4	7	13	23	46	15	13th	—	COPAMX	R16	—	—		
1957–58	Segunda División	22	15	2	5	55	24	32	2nd	—	—	—	—	—		
1958–59	Segunda División	32	25	2	5	80	29	52	2nd	—	—	—	—	—		
1959–60	Segunda División	34	20	8	6	65	30	48	1st	W	—	—	—	—		
1960–61	Primera División	26	7	7	12	31	44	21	13th	—	COPAMX	PR	—	—		
1961–62	Primera División	26	7	5	14	37	47	19	13th	—	COPAMX	GS	—	—		
1962–63	Primera División	26	8	12	6	42	38	28	5th	—	COPAMX	PR	—	—		
1963–64	Primera División	26	12	8	6	40	26	32	3rd	—	COPAMX	RU	—	—		
1964–65	Primera División	30	17	3	10	45	27	37	3rd	—	COPAMX	GS	—	—		
1965–66	Primera División	30	13	7	10	41	37	33	4th	—	COPAMX	GS	—	—		
1966–67	Primera División	30	10	10	10	35	34	30	8th	—	COPAMX	QF	—	—		
1967–68	Primera División	30	6	9	15	30	45	21	14th	—	COPAMX	GS	—	—		
1968–69	Primera División	30	10	8	12	37	46	28	11th	—	COPAMX	RU	—	—		
1969–70	Primera División	30	9	10	11	39	41	28	9th	—	COPAMX	GS	—	—		
Mexico 70	Primera División	28	7	11	10	29	41	25	13th	—	—	—	—	—		
1970–71	Primera División	34	15	10	9	46	37	40	3rd	—	COPAMX	SF	—	—		
1971–72	Primera División	37	15	12	10	44	42	42	3rd	SF	COPAMX	SF	—	—		
1972–73	Primera División	34	10	12	12	31	38	32	11th	—	—	—	—	—		
1973–74	Primera División	36	23	4	9	70	42	50	2nd	SF	COPAMX	GS	—	—		
1974–75	Primera División	38	15	14	9	72	55	44	7th	—	COPAMX	GS	—	—		
1975–76	Primera División	42	18	13	11	56	42	49	5th	SF	COPAMX	GS	CCL			
1976–77	Primera División	38	10	12	16	51	59	32	15th	—	—	—	—	—		
1977–78	Primera División	38	15	8	15	63	56	38	10th	—	—	—	—	—		
1978–79	Primera División	44	15	16	13	60	51	46	9th	GS	—	—	—	—		
1979–80	Primera División	38	9	16	13	40	50	34	12th	—	—	—	—	—		
1980–81	Primera División	38	12	14	12	50	55	38	10th	—	—	—	—	—		
1981–82	Primera División	40	14	14	12	52	61	42	10th	QF	—	—	—	—		
1982–83	Primera División	38	9	13	16	33	47	31	18th	—	—	—	—	—		
1983–84	Primera División	40	14	12	14	55	50	40	11th	QF	—	—	—	—		
1984–85	Primera División	38	10	12	16	50	68	32	15th	—	—	—	—	—		
PRODE 85	Primera División	8	1	3	4	10	20	5	17th	—	—	—	—	—		
Mexico 86	Primera División	24	17	4	3	54	20	38	1st	W	—	—	—	—		
1986–87	Primera División	42	15	10	17	51	59	40	12th	QF	—	—	CCL			
1987–88	Primera División	38	9	13	16	55	65	31	16th	—	COPAMX	QF	CCL			
1988–89	Primera División	38	7	15	16	44	66	29	17th	—	COPAMX	GS	—	—		
1989–90	Primera División	38	15	12	11	57	51	42	4th	—	COPAMX	SF	—	—		
1990–91	Primera División	40	20	9	11	63	46	49	2nd	QF	COPAMX	QF	—	—		
1991–92	Primera División	38	12	13	13	41	49	37	13th	—	COPAMX	W	—	—		
1992–93	Primera División	44	17	17	10	56	45	51	5th	RU	—	—	CCWC			
1993–94	Primera División	38	12	12	14	56	71	36	13th	—	—	—	CCL			
1994–95	Primera División	38	10	15	13	39	54	35	11th	R16	COPAMX	2R	—	—		
1995–96	Primera División	36	13	14	9	54	49	53	5th	QF	COPAMX	2R	—	—		
Invierno 1996	Primera División	19	6	4	9	18	27	22	11th	R16	COPAMX	GS	—	—		
Verano 1997	Primera División	17	5	3	9	25	38	18	14th	—	COPAMX	GS	—	—		
Invierno 1997	Primera División	17	6	4	7	22	22	22	9th	—	—	—	—	—		
Verano 1998	Primera División	17	4	6	7	20	25	18	14th	—	—	—	—	—		
Invierno 1998	Primera División	17	4	7	6	20	30	19	13th	—	—	—	PreLIB			
Verano 1999	Primera División	17	4	2	11	25	38	14	17th	—	—	—	CL			
Invierno 1999	Primera División	17	6	2	9	29	35	20	13th	—	—	—	—	—		
Verano 2000	Primera División	17	5	6	6	20	31	21	12th	—	—	—	—	—		
Invierno 2000	Primera División	17	5	5	7	23	30	20	12th	—	—	—	—	—		
Verano 2001	Primera División	19	7	8	4	27	24	29	3rd	QF	—	—	—	—		
Invierno 2001	Primera División	18	4	8	6	23	31	20	13th	—	—	—	—	—		
Verano 2002	Primera División	18	5	5	8	21	28	20	15th	—	—	—	—	—		
Apertura 2002	Primera División	19	5	7	7	18	20	22	14th	—	—	—	—	—		
Clausura 2003	Primera División	25	12	9	4	43	29	45	3rd	W	—	—	—	—		
Apertura 2003	Primera División	19	5	7	7	29	29	22	14th	—	—	—	—	—		
Clausura 2004	Primera División	19	2	12	5	28	30	18	17th	—	—	—	CCL			
Apertura 2004	Primera División	23	11	4	8	47	42	37	6th	RU	—	—	—	—		
Clausura 2005	Primera División	19	8	5	6	27	28	29	7th	QF	—	—	CCL			
Apertura 2005	Primera División	23	13	6	4	44	28	45	2nd	RU	—	—	—	—		
Clausura 2006	Primera División	17	5	3	9	17	21	18	16th	—	—	—	—	—		
Apertura 2006	Primera División	19	7	7	5	28	23	28	5th	QF	—	—	—	—		
Clausura 2007	Primera División	17	5	4	8	17	23	19	15th	—	—	—	—	—		
Apertura 2007	Primera División	17	3	5	9	18	25	14	17th	—	—	—	—	—		
Clausura 2008	Primera División	21	7	9	5	38	30	30	8th	SF	—	—	—	—		
Apertura 2008	Primera División	17	5	4	8	18	26	19	14th	—	—	—	—	—		
Clausura 2009	Primera División	19	7	6	6	31	27	27	4th	QF	—	—	—	—		
Apertura 2009	Primera División	23	13	5	5	38	22	44	5th	W	—	—	—	—		
Bicentenario 2010	Primera División	19	10	6	3	31	18	36	1st	QF	—	—	CL			
Apertura 2010	Primera División	23	11	8	4	40	27	41	2nd	W	—	—	CCL			
Clausura 2011	Primera División	19	8	5	6	26	23	29	7th	QF	—	—	CCL			
Apertura 2011	Primera División	17	7	3	7	27	26	24	11th	—	—	—	CCL			
Clausura 2012	Primera División	23	11	8	4	40	21	41	2nd	RU	—	—	CCL			
Apertura 2012	Primera División	19	5	9	5	24	26	24	7th	QF	—	—	CCL			
Clausura 2013	Primera División	21	8	4	9	27	27	28	9th	SF	—	—	CCL			
Apertura 2013	Primera División	17	5	5	7	22	23	20	11th	—	COPAMX	SF	CWC			
Clausura 2014	Primera División	17	6	5	6	20	20	23	10th	—	COPAMX	QF	—	—		
Apertura 2014	Primera División	21	9	4	8	27	24	31	6th	SF	COPAMX	GS	—	—		
Clausura 2015	Primera División	17	7	3	7	24	27	24	12th	—	COPAMX	SF	—	—		
Apertura 2015	Primera División	17	6	5	6	32	29	23	9th	—	COPAMX	GS	—	—		
Clausura 2016	Primera División	23	14	2	7	47	31	44	1st	RU	COPAMX	GS	—	—		
Apertura 2016	Primera División	17	6	7	4	30	21	25	9th	—	—	—	CCL			
Clausura 2017	Primera División	19	7	6	6	27	24	27	2nd	QF	COPAMX	SF	—	—		
Apertura 2017	Primera División	23	15	5	3	42	17	50	1st	RU	COPAMX	W	—	—		
Clausura 2018	Primera División	19	8	6	5	32	24	30	3rd	QF	COPAMX	R16	—	—		
Apertura 2018	Primera División	21	12	3	6	29	20	39	5th	SF	COPAMX	RU	—	—		
Clausura 2019	Primera División	21	10	6	5	35	23	36	3rd	SF	—	—	CCL			
Apertura 2019	Primera División	24	12	4	8	39	30	40	8th	W	COPAMX	W	CWC			
Clausura 2020 (Note: The tournament was left unfinished due to the COVID-19 pandemic.)	Primera División	10	0	5	5	10	17	5	18th	—	COPAMX	W	—	—		
Apertura 2020	Primera División	18	8	6	4	28	23	30	5th	R16	—	—	—	—		
Clausura 2021	Primera División	19	8	5	6	24	16	29	4th	QF	—	—	CCL			
Apertura 2021	Primera División	20	6	9	5	24	18	27	9th	QF	—	—	CCL			
Clausura 2022	Primera División	18	7	6	5	23	19	27	7th	R16	—	—	CWC			
Apertura 2022	Primera División	21	11	6	4	34	19	39	2nd	SF	—	—	—	—		
Clausura 2023	Primera División	21	14	3	4	38	16	45	1st	SF	—	—	—	—		
Apertura 2023	Primera División	19	10	4	5	28	17	33	2nd	QF	—	—	LCup			
Clausura 2024	Primera División	21	11	6	4	37	23	39	4th	SF	—	—	CCL			
Apertura 2024	Primera División	23	12	5	6	40	28	41	5th	RU	—	—	LCup			
Clausura 2025	Primera División	21	10	4	7	39	29	34	7th	QF	—	—	CCL			
Apertura 2025	Primera División	21	11	4	6	39	34	37	7th	SF	—	—	CCL			
Clausura 2026	Primera División															
