= C.D. Olimpia =

Association football club in Honduras

Olimpia
- Full name: Club Deportivo Olimpia
- Nicknames: Los Leones (The Lions); Los Albos (The Whites); Los Merengues (The Meringues); Rey de Copas (King of Cups)
- Short name: OLI
- Founded: 12 June 1912; 114 years ago
- Ground: Estadio Nacional Chelato Uclés
- Capacity: 35,000
- Owner: Televicentro
- President: Rafael Villeda
- Manager: Eduardo Espinel
- League: Liga Nacional
- 2026 Clausura: League table: 1st Semifinal triangulars: Group A (eliminated)
- Website: clubolimpia.com
Home colours	Away colours	Third colours

Club Deportivo Olimpia is a Honduran professional football club based in Tegucigalpa. The club is the nation's most successful team both in the domestic league and in international club competitions. The club competes in the Liga Nacional de Fútbol de Honduras, the top tier of Honduran football.

Olimpia is the most successful football team in Honduras, having won 40 domestic league titles since its foundation. It has also represented the Honduran football association in international club competitions more than any other team by far. They are the only Honduran club that has won the CONCACAF Champions Cup twice, first in 1972 and again in 1988.

== History ==
Olimpia was originally founded as a baseball club named Nacional Olimpia on June 12, 1912, by Héctor Pineda Ugarte, Carlos Bram, Arturo Bram, Enrique Buk, Santiago Buk, Miguel Sanchez, Samuel Inestrosa Gómez, and Ramón Escobar. The name was dedicated to the ancient Olympic Games that were held in Olympia, Greece in 1896. Due to baseball being the more popular sport in Honduras at the time, Olimpia would not form a football team until later in 1917.

=== Regional and amateur era ===
In 1927, the Liga Morazán was organized as the first football governing body in Tegucigalpa. The founding teams included Honduras Athletic, América, Herrera, and Olimpia. To secure affiliation with the league, Olimpia was required to cease its baseball operations, as the league's statutes prohibited a single club from operating multiple sports departments. Consequently, during a session convened by club president Humberto Díaz, the membership voted unanimously to transition exclusively to football. That same year, Olimpia won the inaugural regional league title, successfully defending it in 1928. In September 1928, the Honduran Sports Federation (Federación Deportiva de Honduras) made an effort to establish a national football champion as part of the Second National Sports Week. C.D. Marathón, the champion of the North Coast region, traveled to Tegucigalpa to face Olimpia, the champion of the Central and Comayagua zones. In a series of three matches held at El Campo La Isla. Olimpia finished the three-match series against Marathón with two wins and one draw (1–0, 1–1, and 2–1), and was crowned as the first national champion of the one-off tournament. These matches ignited the club rivalry known as El Clásico Nacional between Olimpia and Marathón. Olimpia would go on to win the 1929, 1930, 1931, 1935, 1936, and 1937 editions of the Liga Morazán, alternating title wins with F.C. Motagua and establishing the local rivalry known as the Honduran Superclásico.

In 1947, the Honduran Amateur League was created and organized by the Federación Nacional de Cultura Física y Deportes (National Federation of Physical Culture and Sports) for the first four editions. The remaining thirteen editions were organized by the Federación Nacional Deportiva Extraescolar de Honduras (National Extracurricular Sports Federation of Honduras). Stuck in a transitional phase for a decade, Olimpia would not its first national championship until 1957, as they defeated Vida, Hibueras, and C.D. Honduras en route to the title. They defended their title successfully in 1958, 1959, 1961, 1963, and 1964. No championship was awarded in 1960. In 1964, the final season of the amateur league, Olimpia claimed a seventh championship, defeating Platense 3–0 on aggregate over three legs.

=== National league ===
The first professional football league in Honduras was founded in 1965, with Platense winning the inaugural tournament. Olimpia was runner-up, finishing with 26 points to Platense's 27. Things were different the following year, as Mario Griffin Cubas was appointed as head coach. In the 1966–67 season, he led Los Leones to 14 victories in 18 matches, winning the title six points clear of Marathón (29 to 23). Olimpia won the title again in 1967–68, with two games to spare against Marathón.

They relinquished the title to Motagua in 1968–69, but in 1969–70 finished the league season undefeated, winning their third title in four years. After losing a championship playoff to Motagua in 1970–71, Los Leones regained the crown in 1971–72. That championship was the product of the efforts of Rigoberto 'Chula' Gomez, Jorge Urquía, and Tonin Mendoza. It would take 6 years for Olimpia to be crowned again. That came in 1977, under the management of Carlos Cruz Carranza. That year, they faced Real España in a championship final. The first leg ended in a scoreless draw, but Olimpia prevailed 2–0 in the return leg. Goals were scored by Uruguayan Walter Chávez and René Enamorado.

It was during the 1980s that Olimpia emerged as the dominant team in Honduras, winning five championships in ten years: 1982, 1984, 1986, 1987, and 1989–90. Three more championships came in the 1990s: 1992–93, 1995–96, and 1996–97. That 1996–97 championship was the final one before the short season was adopted.

=== Short tournament ===
The Honduran Liga Nacional adopted the split Apertura and Clausura format starting with the 1997–98 season. During this transition period from 1997 through 2000, Olimpia remained a heavy powerhouse but went through an initial domestic title drought before bouncing back on both the domestic and international stages.

Due to the effects of Hurricane Mitch in Honduras, the Liga Nacional was forced to revert to the previous tournament format for the 1998–99 season. Olimpia topped the regular season table and beat Real España 1–0 on aggregate in the grand final, capturing their final league title before a drought that lasted until late 2000. Olimpia reached the finals of both Apertura 1999 and Clausura 2000, but on each occasion was defeated by Motagua on penalties. The first title under this new format was won by Olimpia in the Apertura 2000–01 tournament, led by Edwin Pavón. In that championship, Olimpia finished first in the regular tournament with a total of 39 points in 18 matches. This secured their spot in the final against Platense, winners of the post-season games. In the end, Olimpia was crowned champion with players such as Danilo Tosello, Wilmer Velásquez, and Álex Pineda Chacón, among others. The next title Olimpia won under this format was also against Platense in the Apertura 2002–03 with Juan Carlos Espinoza as coach.

The Clausura 2004 was the start of a new phase in the already fierce rivalry between Olimpia and Marathón, as the teams would meet in the finals for four consecutive seasons to determine the national champion. The first round went to Olimpia, which won the title 2–1 on aggregate. Marathón came back to win Apertura 2004 in the same style, but Olimpia answered by winning the Clausura 2005 3–2 on aggregate. Los Leones won it again in Apertura 2005, overcoming a 2–1 loss at Marathón to win the championship in extra time.

Clausura 2006 was a significant season in Olimpia's history; they beat Victoria 6–4 on aggregate to win three consecutive titles. This achievement is known as the tricampeonato.

Other titles followed in Clausura 2008 (beating the old rivals Marathón), Clausura 2009 (in extra time over Real España), and Clausura 2010 (over Motagua). However, the next era of glory began in Apertura 2011. That was the season that Danilo Tosello, who had played for Olimpia from 1999 to 2007, returned as manager. In Tosello's first season as manager, he led Olimpia to a convincing 3–0 aggregate victory over Real España in the championship round. They repeated as champions in Clausura 2012, beating Marathón 1–0 on aggregate. Then, finally in Apertura 2012, still under Tosello's guidance, Olimpia defeated Victoria 4–0 to complete a second tricampeónato. Tosello stepped down after the season, but Olimpia's run of dominance continued. They won a fourth consecutive championship in Clausura 2013; after losing 1–0 to Real Sociedad in the first leg, they won 2–0 at home to claim the crown.

Olimpia's quest for an unprecedented fifth straight crown ended in Apertura 2013, but they did beat Marathón 4–2 on penalties in Clausura 2014 to hoist a fifth title in six years. They also beat Motagua to win Clausura 2015, and Real Sociedad to win Clausura 2016.

=== International success ===
In 1972, Olimpia won their first CONCACAF Champions Cup by defeating SV Robinhood of Suriname in San Pedro Sula by a score of 1–0 after drawing the first leg 0–0 in Tegucigalpa. Before reaching the final, Olimpia eliminated Mexico's Toluca FC. The club won their second CONCACAF Champions' Cup in 1988 when they defeated Trinidadian club Defence Force in the final match of the tournament. Before that, Olimpia defeated Mexican champions Cruz Azul by a score of 2–1 in a historic match that took place in the Estadio Azteca. To this day, Olimpia remains the only Central American club to have defeated a Mexican team in that stadium. In the semi-finals, Olimpia defeated Costa Rican giants Alajuelense at the Estadio Alejandro Morera Soto after they tied the home game in Tegucigalpa.

During the 2000 edition of the CONCACAF Champions' Cup, Olimpia defeated Toluca once again by a score of 1–0 in the quarterfinals and later Pachuca 4–0 in the semifinals. Olimpia lost the final 3–2 to Major League Soccer club LA Galaxy at the Los Angeles Memorial Coliseum, but qualified for the subsequently cancelled 2001 FIFA Club World Championship.

In 2017, Olimpia won the inaugural CONCACAF League title, the club's first international trophy since 1988. Los Leones defeated Costa Rican side Santos de Guápiles 4–1 on penalties after a 1–1 aggregate score kept things level over two legs. Olimpia would win its second CONCACAF League in 2022, which also served as the final edition of the tournament. Olimpia defeated Alajuelense 5–4 on aggregate in the finals to claim a second title and secure qualification to the 2023 CONCACAF Champions League.

== Crests and colours ==
The lion appears on the club's crest, serving as both a logo element and the team mascot. Olimpia's crest has evolved; for a period, the team's shirts did not feature a logo, appearing completely white or with the club's name written across the chest. The lion was eventually integrated onto the jersey, and the logo was later modernized to align the lion's color palette with the team's official colors. Select variations of the crest have undergone slight modifications over the years, such as the addition of stars to represent domestic and international titles.

In 2012, a commemorative crest was introduced to mark the club's centennial. The emblem was styled entirely in gold to represent the club's milestone anniversary. The design featured a rampant lion with a football under its paw, beneath a crown that symbolized their "King of Cups" moniker—a reference to holding the most titles in Honduran football. The years 1912–2012 were displayed alongside the lion to denote the centennial period. Laurel branches flanked the lion to signify the club's historic sporting achievements. At the top of the emblem, three stars represented their two CONCACAF Champions Cup titles and their Central American Championship. At the base, the name "Olimpia" appeared beneath a vintage scroll containing the word "Centenario." To celebrate the anniversary, the club held friendly matches against Liga MX's Club América and Serie A's AC Milan.

=== Shirt sponsorship ===
- Official shirt sponsors -Banco Atlántida, Coca-Cola, Hugo, Cerveza Salva Vida
- Official shirt manufacturer – Umbro
- Official Beer – Salva Vida

== Home Stadium ==
The Chelato Uclés National Stadium is the official venue of Olimpia. The stadium is located in the capital city of Tegucigalpa and has a capacity of approximately 35,000. The stadium features a circular structure divided into four sections, as well as VIP boxes and broadcast booths.

The stadium was built during the presidency of Tiburcio Carías Andino to develop national sports infrastructure. It was inaugurated on March 15, 1948, with a baseball game between Honduras and Cuba. The football inauguration took place during a subsequent quadrangular tournament featuring the national teams of Honduras, Guatemala, Costa Rica, and Panama.

== Supporters ==
Olimpia has a large fan base throughout all of Honduras, even in cities that have a team in the Honduran first division. As a result, it is considered to be the most popular team in the country. The club's barra brava is La Ultra Fiel. La Ultra Fiel has a fierce rivalry with cross-town rivals Motagua's barra brava known as "Los Revolucionarios".

== Club rivalries ==
=== Clásico Nacional ===
El Clásico Nacional (The National Classic) is a Honduran national derby played between Olimpia and Marathón. The derby receives the "national" adjective more due to geographic placement (Olimpia is from Tegucigalpa and Marathón is from San Pedro Sula, the largest cities in the country) than for a football or rivalry matter.

=== Clasico Capitalino ===
The Clasico Capitalino (Capital's Classic) is played between Olimpia and Motagua. Their matches are also known as the Clasico Local (Local Classic). Some consider this rivalry to be the "true" national derby because Olimpia and Motagua are the two most dominant clubs in the nation. Additionally, matches between Olimpia and Marathón do not generate the same expectations and polemics as matches between Olimpia and Motagua do.

=== Clásico Moderno ===
El Clásico Moderno (The Modern Derby) is played between Olimpia and Real España. The is considered a significant rivalry since it features the biggest team from the north coast from San Pedro Sula against the biggest team in Honduras. This rivalry dates back to the 1970s when Real España was dominating the league.

== Honours ==
=== Domestic ===
- Liga Nacional de Fútbol de Honduras
  - Winners (40): 1966–67, 1967–68, 1969–70, 1971–72, 1977–78, 1982–83, 1984–85, 1986–87, 1987–88, 1989–90, 1992–93, 1995–96, 1996–97, 1998–99, 2000–01 Apertura, 2002–03 Apertura, 2003–04 Clausura, 2004–05 Clausura, 2005–06 Apertura, 2005–06 Clausura, 2007–08 Clausura, 2008–09 Clausura, 2009–10 Clausura, 2011–12 Apertura, 2011–12 Clausura, 2012–13 Apertura, 2012–13 Clausura, 2013–14 Clausura, 2014–15 Clausura, 2015–16 Clausura, 2019–20 Apertura, 2020–21 Apertura, 2020–21 Clausura, 2021–22 Apertura, 2022–23 Apertura, 2022–23 Clausura, 2023–24 Apertura, 2023–24 Clausura, 2024–25 Clausura, 2025–26 Apertura
  - Runners-up (20): 1965–66, 1968–69, 1970–71, 1975–76, 1988–89, 1994–95, Clausura 1998, Apertura 1999, Clausura 2000, Clausura 2001, Clausura 2002, Apertura 2003, Apertura 2004, Apertura 2006, Apertura 2009, Apertura 2010, Clausura 2011, 2024–25 Apertura
- Honduran Cup
  - Winners (3): 1995, 1998, 2015

=== International ===
==== Intercontinental ====
- Copa Interamericana
  - Runners-up (2): 1972, 1988

==== Continental ====
- CONCACAF Champions Cup
  - Winners (2): 1972, 1988
  - Runners-up (2): 1985, 2000
- CONCACAF League
  - Winners (2): 2017, 2022

==== Regional ====
- Campeonato Centroamericano
  - Winners (1): 1959
- Copa Fraternidad/Copa Interclubes UNCAF
  - Winners (2): 1999, 2000
  - Runners-up (3): 1981, 2005, 2006

=== Amateur ===
- Honduran Amateur League: 1957–58, 1958–59, 1959, 1960–61, 1961, 1963–64, 1964
- Francisco Morazán Major League: 1949, 1955–56, 1957, 1958, 1959, 1960, 1961, 1963, 1964

== Players ==
=== Current squad ===
As of 16 September 2026

Note: Flags indicate national team as defined under FIFA eligibility rules; some limited exceptions apply. Players may hold more than one non-FIFA nationality.

No.	Pos.	Nation	Player
1	GK	HON	Edrick Menjívar (captain)
2	DF	URU	Emanuel Hernández
3	DF	HON	Clinton Bennett
4	DF	HON	Edwin Lobo
5	DF	URU	Emanuel Cuello
6	DF	HON	Félix García
7	FW	ARG	Imanol Enríquez
8	MF	HON	Edwin Rodríguez
9	FW	HON	Jorge Benguché
12	DF	HON	Cristian Canales
14	MF	HON	Jack Jean-Baptiste
15	DF	HON	Kevin Güity
18	MF	HON	Raul García

No.	Pos.	Nation	Player
19	FW	HON	Yustin Arboleda
20	MF	HON	Áxel Maldonado
21	FW	HON	Kilmar Peña
23	MF	HON	Jorge Alvarez
24	FW	HON	Jainer Bermúdez
25	MF	HON	Didier Paguada
26	FW	HON	David Flores
31	FW	URU	Nicolás Dibble
33	FW	HON	Michaell Chirinos
38	GK	HON	Rodbin Mejía
39	MF	HON	Anthony Ortiz
40	GK	HON	Onan Rodriguez

=== Reserve team ===
Note: Flags indicate national team as defined under FIFA eligibility rules; some limited exceptions apply. Players may hold more than one non-FIFA nationality.

No.	Pos.	Nation	Player
45	MF	HON	Brayan Cortes
57	FW	HON	Daniel Puerto
62	DF	HON	Yeremy David
64	FW	HON	Héctor Ávila

No.	Pos.	Nation	Player
68	FW	HON	Jeremy Rodríguez
69	FW	HON	Eduardo Romero
72	GK	HON	Jhozua Cabrera
73	DF	HON	Denzel Arzú

=== Retired numbers ===
Note: Flags indicate national team as defined under FIFA eligibility rules; some limited exceptions apply. Players may hold more than one non-FIFA nationality.

No.	Pos.	Nation	Player
11	FW	HON	Wilmer Velásquez (1991–95, 1996–98, 1999–01, 2002–09)

== Personnel ==
=== Current technical staff ===
Head coach	(Uruguay) Eduardo Espinel
Assistant coach	(Uruguay) Osvaldo Carro
Physical trainer	(Uruguay) Daniel Curbelo
Goalkeeping coach	(Peru) Sergio López

=== Board of directors ===
President	Rafael Villeda
Vice-president	Osman Madrid
Sport director	Miguel Flores Cisnero
Sports manager	Antonio Montes Rittenhouse

== Performance in international competitions ==
The following is a list of results for Olimpia in international competitions. Olimpia's scores are listed first.

Year	Tournament	Round	Opponent	Home	Away	Agg.
1962	CONCACAF Champions' Cup	First Round	(Costa Rica) Alajuelense	0–1	1–1	1–2
1964	CONCACAF Champions' Cup	First Round	(Costa Rica) Uruguay de Coronado	0–2		1–4
1964	CONCACAF Champions' Cup	First Round	(Costa Rica) Uruguay de Coronado	1–2		1–4
1965	CONCACAF Champions' Cup	First Round	(Nicaragua) Santa Cecilia	3–0	1–2	4–2
1965	CONCACAF Champions' Cup	Second Round	(El Salvador) Águila	1–0	2–4	3–4
1967	CONCACAF Champions' Cup	First Round	(Guatemala) Aurora	0–1	1–0	1–1
1967	CONCACAF Champions' Cup	First Round	(Guatemala) Aurora		0–2	
1968	CONCACAF Champions' Cup	First Round	(El Salvador) Alianza	1–0	2–1	3–1
1968	CONCACAF Champions' Cup	Second Round	(Guatemala) Aurora	1–1	0–4	1–5
1970	CONCACAF Champions' Cup	First Round	(Guatemala) Municipal	3–2	0–0	3–2
1970	CONCACAF Champions' Cup	Final Round	(Costa Rica) Saprissa	1–4	0–1	1–5
1971	CONCACAF Champions' Cup	First Round	(Costa Rica) Alajuelense	0–0	0–1	0–1
1972	CONCACAF Champions' Cup	Semi-finals	(Mexico) Toluca	1–0		2–1
1972	CONCACAF Champions' Cup	Semi-finals	(Mexico) Toluca	1–1		2–1
1972	CONCACAF Champions' Cup	Final	(Suriname) Robinhood	1–0		1–0
1972	CONCACAF Champions' Cup	Final	(Suriname) Robinhood	0–0		1–0
1973	CONCACAF Champions' Cup	First Round	(Guatemala) Municipal	0–1	0–0	0–1
1976	CONCACAF Champions' Cup	First Round	(Honduras) Real España	0–0	0–1	0–1
1979	Copa Fraternidad	Group Stage	(Honduras) Motagua	1–1		
1979	Copa Fraternidad	Group Stage	(Guatemala) Aurora	0–1		
1979	Copa Fraternidad	Group Stage	(Guatemala) Municipal	1–2		
1979	Copa Fraternidad	Group Stage	(El Salvador) Santiagueño	4–1		
1979	Copa Fraternidad	Group Stage	(El Salvador) Alianza	2–0		
1979	Copa Fraternidad	Group Stage	(Honduras) Motagua		0–1	
1979	Copa Fraternidad	Group Stage	(Guatemala) Aurora		0–0	
1979	Copa Fraternidad	Group Stage	(Guatemala) Municipal		0–2	
1979	Copa Fraternidad	Group Stage	(El Salvador) Santiagueño		1–1	
1979	Copa Fraternidad	Group Stage	(El Salvador) Alianza		4–1	
1981	Copa Fraternidad	First Round	(Guatemala) Xelajú	1–0	1–1	2–1
1981	Copa Fraternidad	Second Round	(Guatemala) Comunicaciones	1–1	1–0	2–1
1981	Copa Fraternidad	Final Round	(Honduras) Real España		1–1	
1981	Copa Fraternidad	Final Round	(Honduras) Marathón	1–1		
1981	Copa Fraternidad	Final Round	(Honduras) Marathón		2–2	
1981	Copa Fraternidad	Final Round	(Honduras) Real España	1–1		
1983	CONCACAF Champions' Cup	First Round	(Mexico) Tigres UANL	0–1	1–2	1–3
1985	CONCACAF Champions' Cup	First Round	(United States) Chicago Croatian	4–0		6–0
1985	CONCACAF Champions' Cup	First Round	(United States) Chicago Croatian	2–0		6–0
1985	CONCACAF Champions' Cup	Second Round	(Guatemala) Suchitepéquez	1–0	0–1	1–1
1985	CONCACAF Champions' Cup	Third Round	(Mexico) América		2–2	3–2
1985	CONCACAF Champions' Cup	Third Round	(Mexico) América		1–0	3–2
1985	CONCACAF Champions' Cup	Fourth Round	(Guatemala) Aurora	2–0	0–1	2–1
1985	CONCACAF Champions' Cup	Final	(Trinidad and Tobago) Defence Force	1–0	0–2	1–2
1987	CONCACAF Champions' Cup	First Round	(Belize) Coke Milpross	8–1	1–1	10–2
1987	CONCACAF Champions' Cup	Second Round	(Guatemala) Galcasa	1–0		
1987	CONCACAF Champions' Cup	Second Round	(Costa Rica) Herediano	0–0		
1987	CONCACAF Champions' Cup	Second Round	(El Salvador) Águila	2–1		
1987	CONCACAF Champions' Cup	Third Round	(Costa Rica) Saprissa		4–1	
1987	CONCACAF Champions' Cup	Third Round	(Honduras) Real España		1–0	
1987	CONCACAF Champions' Cup	Third Round	(Costa Rica) Herediano		1–2	
1987	CONCACAF Champions' Cup	Semi-finals	(Mexico) Monterrey	0–1	2–2	2–3
1988	CONCACAF Champions' Cup	First Round	(El Salvador) FAS	3–1		
1988	CONCACAF Champions' Cup	First Round	(Guatemala) Aurora	1–1		
1988	CONCACAF Champions' Cup	First Round	(Costa Rica) Municipal Puntarenas	2–0		
1988	CONCACAF Champions' Cup	Second Round	(Guatemala) Aurora	0–0		
1988	CONCACAF Champions' Cup	Second Round	(Costa Rica) Alajuelense	1–1		
1988	CONCACAF Champions' Cup	Second Round	(Honduras) Marathón	2–1		
1988	CONCACAF Champions' Cup	Third Round	(Mexico) Cruz Azul	0–0	2–1	2–1
1988	CONCACAF Champions' Cup	Semi-finals	(Costa Rica) Alajuelense	1–1	1–0	2–1
1988	CONCACAF Champions' Cup	Final	(Trinidad and Tobago) Defence Force	2–0	2–0	4–0
1989	CONCACAF Champions' Cup	First Round	(El Salvador) Cojutepeque	3–1		
1989	CONCACAF Champions' Cup	First Round	(Costa Rica) Herediano	2–1		
1989	CONCACAF Champions' Cup	First Round	(Guatemala) Municipal	2–2		
1989	CONCACAF Champions' Cup	Second Round	(Costa Rica) Cartaginés	3–0		
1989	CONCACAF Champions' Cup	Second Round	(Honduras) Real España	3–0		
1989	CONCACAF Champions' Cup	Second Round	(Costa Rica) Herediano	2–1		
1989	CONCACAF Champions' Cup	Third Round	(Mexico) Pumas UNAM	1–1	0–5	1–6
1990	CONCACAF Champions' Cup	First Round	(Belize) Juventus			w/o
1990	CONCACAF Champions' Cup	Second Round	(Guatemala) Suchitepéquez	2–2		4–2
1990	CONCACAF Champions' Cup	Second Round	(Guatemala) Suchitepéquez	2–0		4–2
1990	CONCACAF Champions' Cup	Third Round	(El Salvador) Firpo	1–1		
1990	CONCACAF Champions' Cup	Third Round	(El Salvador) Firpo		1–0	
1990	CONCACAF Champions' Cup	Third Round	(Honduras) Real España		1–4	
1990	CONCACAF Champions' Cup	Third Round	(Honduras) Real España	1–0		
1990	CONCACAF Champions' Cup	Semi-finals	(Mexico) América		0–3	1–5
1990	CONCACAF Champions' Cup	Semi-finals	(Mexico) América		1–2	1–5
1994	CONCACAF Champions' Cup	First Round	(Costa Rica) Herediano	0–0	0–2	0–2
1996	CONCACAF Champions' Cup	First Round	(Costa Rica) Saprissa	3–0	0–4	3–4
1996	CONCACAF Cup Winners Cup	Round 2	(Panama) Árabe Unido		1–0	3–0
1996	CONCACAF Cup Winners Cup	Round 2	(Panama) Árabe Unido		2–0	3–0
1997	CONCACAF Cup Winners Cup	Second Round	(Costa Rica) Belén	1–0		
1997	CONCACAF Cup Winners Cup	Final Round	(El Salvador) Platense		3–3	
1997	CONCACAF Cup Winners Cup	Final Round	(Guatemala) Municipal	2–1		
1997	CONCACAF Cup Winners Cup	Final	(Mexico) Necaxa	Cancelled		
1997	Torneo Grandes de Centroamérica	Group Stage	(Costa Rica) Alajuelense		2–2	
1997	Torneo Grandes de Centroamérica	Group Stage	(El Salvador) Águila	1–1		
1997	Torneo Grandes de Centroamérica	Group Stage	(Guatemala) Municipal	0–1		
1997	Torneo Grandes de Centroamérica	Group Stage	(Guatemala) Municipal		0–1	
1997	Torneo Grandes de Centroamérica	Group Stage	(Costa Rica) Alajuelense	0–0		
1997	Torneo Grandes de Centroamérica	Group Stage	(El Salvador) Águila		2–4	
1997	CONCACAF Champions' Cup	First Round	(El Salvador) Firpo	1–3	0–0	1–3
1997–98	Torneo Grandes de Centroamérica	Qualifying	(Honduras) Real España	2–2		
1997–98	Torneo Grandes de Centroamérica	Qualifying	(Honduras) Motagua		1–0	
1997–98	Torneo Grandes de Centroamérica	Group Phase	(Guatemala) Municipal	3–2		
1997–98	Torneo Grandes de Centroamérica	Group Phase	(Costa Rica) Herediano		1–2	
1997–98	Torneo Grandes de Centroamérica	Group Phase	(El Salvador) Águila		0–3	
1997–98	Torneo Grandes de Centroamérica	Group Phase	(Guatemala) Municipal		0–1	
1997–98	Torneo Grandes de Centroamérica	Group Phase	(Costa Rica) Herediano	2–1		
1997–98	Torneo Grandes de Centroamérica	Group Phase	(El Salvador) Águila	2–1		
1997–98	Torneo Grandes de Centroamérica	Semi-finals	(Costa Rica) Saprissa			w/o
1998	CONCACAF Champions' Cup	First Stage	(Belize) Juventus		2–0	
1998	CONCACAF Champions' Cup	First Stage	(Guatemala) Comunicaciones		2–3	
1998	CONCACAF Champions' Cup	First Stage	(El Salvador) Alianza		4–1	
1998	CONCACAF Champions' Cup	Second Stage	(Costa Rica) Alajuelense	0–1		
1998	CONCACAF Champions' Cup	Second Stage	(El Salvador) Firpo		0–2	
1998	CONCACAF Champions' Cup	Second Stage	(Costa Rica) Alajuelense		1–5	
1998	CONCACAF Champions' Cup	Second Stage	(El Salvador) Firpo	1–1		
1999	UNCAF Interclub Cup	First Round	(El Salvador) FAS		1–0	
1999	UNCAF Interclub Cup	First Round	(Guatemala) Aurora	0–0		
1999	UNCAF Interclub Cup	First Round	(Costa Rica) Alajuelense		1–1	
1999	UNCAF Interclub Cup	First Round	(Nicaragua) Walter Ferretti	Cancelled		
1999	UNCAF Interclub Cup	First Round	(Belize) Real Verdes	2–0		
1999	UNCAF Interclub Cup	First Round	(El Salvador) FAS	2–1		
1999	UNCAF Interclub Cup	First Round	(Guatemala) Aurora		2–2	
1999	UNCAF Interclub Cup	First Round	(Costa Rica) Alajuelense	4–1		
1999	UNCAF Interclub Cup	First Round	(Nicaragua) Walter Ferretti	Cancelled		
1999	UNCAF Interclub Cup	First Round	(Belize) Real Verdes		1–0	
1999	UNCAF Interclub Cup	Final Round	(Costa Rica) Alajuelense	2–0		
1999	UNCAF Interclub Cup	Final Round	(Guatemala) Comunicaciones	3–1		
1999	UNCAF Interclub Cup	Final Round	(Costa Rica) Saprissa	1–0		
1999	CONCACAF Champions' Cup	Quarter-finals	(United States) D.C. United		0–1	
2000	UNCAF Interclub Cup	First Round	(Belize) La Victoria		3–0	
2000	UNCAF Interclub Cup	First Round	(Belize) La Victoria	w/o		
2000	UNCAF Interclub Cup	First Round	(Guatemala) Municipal	2–3		
2000	UNCAF Interclub Cup	First Round	(Guatemala) Municipal	Cancelled		
2000	UNCAF Interclub Cup	Second Round	(Panama) Panamá Viejo		5–0	
2000	UNCAF Interclub Cup	Second Round	(Guatemala) Municipal		0–0	
2000	UNCAF Interclub Cup	Second Round	(Costa Rica) Saprissa		1–4	
2000	UNCAF Interclub Cup	Final Round	(Guatemala) Municipal		0–0	
2000	UNCAF Interclub Cup	Final Round	(Honduras) Real España		2–0	
2000	UNCAF Interclub Cup	Final Round	(Costa Rica) Alajuelense		0–0	
2000	CONCACAF Champions' Cup	Quarter-finals	(Mexico) Toluca		1–0	
2000	CONCACAF Champions' Cup	Semi-finals	(Mexico) Pachuca		4–0	
2000	CONCACAF Champions' Cup	Final	(United States) Los Angeles Galaxy		2–3	
2001	FIFA Club World Championship	Group Stage	(Brazil) Palmeiras	Cancelled		
2001	FIFA Club World Championship	Group Stage	(Turkey) Galatasaray	Cancelled		
2001	FIFA Club World Championship	Group Stage	(Saudi Arabia) Al Hilal	Cancelled		
2001	UNCAF Interclub Cup	First Round	(Guatemala) Municipal	0–0		
2001	UNCAF Interclub Cup	First Round	(Costa Rica) Alajuelense	0–0		
2001	UNCAF Interclub Cup	First Round	(Panama) Plaza Amador	6–0		
2001	UNCAF Interclub Cup	Final Round	(Guatemala) Comunicaciones		2–0	
2001	UNCAF Interclub Cup	Final Round	(Costa Rica) Saprissa		1–3	
2001	UNCAF Interclub Cup	Final Round	(Guatemala) Municipal		1–2	
2002	CONCACAF Champions' Cup	First Round	(United States) San Jose Earthquakes		0–1	1–4
2002	CONCACAF Champions' Cup	First Round	(United States) San Jose Earthquakes		1–3	1–4
2003	UNCAF Interclub Cup	First Round	(Costa Rica) Alajuelense		1–2	
2003	UNCAF Interclub Cup	First Round	(Honduras) Marathón		0–0	
2003	UNCAF Interclub Cup	First Round	(Panama) San Francisco		0–1	
2004	UNCAF Interclub Cup	First Round	(Belize) Boca Juniors		1–0	6–0
2004	UNCAF Interclub Cup	First Round	(Belize) Boca Juniors		5–0	6–0
2004	UNCAF Interclub Cup	Quarter-finals	(Costa Rica) Herediano	0–1	3–2	3–3
2004	UNCAF Interclub Cup	Final Round	(Costa Rica) Saprissa		0–0	
2004	UNCAF Interclub Cup	Final Round	(Guatemala) Municipal		1–0	
2004	UNCAF Interclub Cup	Final Round	(El Salvador) FAS		1–3	
2005	CONCACAF Champions' Cup	Quarter-finals	(Mexico) Pumas UNAM	1–1	1–2	2–3
2005	UNCAF Interclub Cup	Round of 16	(Belize) Eagles	3–0	1–0	4–0
2005	UNCAF Interclub Cup	Quarter-finals	(Guatemala) Suchitepéquez	4–0	4–1	8–1
2005	UNCAF Interclub Cup	Semi-finals	(Costa Rica) Saprissa	1–1	3–1	4–2
2005	UNCAF Interclub Cup	Final	(Costa Rica) Alajuelense	0–1	1–0	1–1
2006	CONCACAF Champions' Cup	Quarter-finals	(Mexico) Toluca	0–2	1–2	1–4
2006	UNCAF Interclub Cup	First Round	(Nicaragua) Diriangén	2–1	3–0	5–1
2006	UNCAF Interclub Cup	Quarter-finals	(Guatemala) Municipal	3–0	1–1	4–1
2006	UNCAF Interclub Cup	Semi-finals	(Honduras) Victoria	2–0	2–2	4–2
2006	UNCAF Interclub Cup	Final	(Costa Rica) Puntarenas	3–2	2–3	5–5
2007	CONCACAF Champions' Cup	Quarter-finals	(United States) D.C. United	2–3	1–4	3–7
2007	UNCAF Interclub Cup	First Round	(Panama) San Francisco	0–1	0–0	0–1
2008–09	CONCACAF Champions League	Group Stage	(Mexico) Atlante		0–1	
2008–09	CONCACAF Champions League	Group Stage	(Trinidad and Tobago) Joe Public		3–1	
2008–09	CONCACAF Champions League	Group Stage	(Canada) Montreal Impact	1–2		
2008–09	CONCACAF Champions League	Group Stage	(Mexico) Atlante	1–1		
2008–09	CONCACAF Champions League	Group Stage	(Canada) Montreal Impact		1–1	
2008–09	CONCACAF Champions League	Group Stage	(Trinidad and Tobago) Joe Public	4–0		
2009–10	CONCACAF Champions League	Preliminary Round	(Panama) Árabe Unido	2–1	0–1	2–2
2010–11	CONCACAF Champions League	Group Stage	Puerto Rico Islanders		1–1	
2010–11	CONCACAF Champions League	Group Stage	(Mexico) Toluca		0–4	
2010–11	CONCACAF Champions League	Group Stage	(El Salvador) FAS	2–0		
2010–11	CONCACAF Champions League	Group Stage	(Mexico) Toluca	2–1		
2010–11	CONCACAF Champions League	Group Stage	(El Salvador) FAS		4–1	
2010–11	CONCACAF Champions League	Group Stage	Puerto Rico Islanders	3–0		
2010–11	CONCACAF Champions League	Quarter-finals	(Costa Rica) Saprissa	1–2	0–1	1–3
2011–12	CONCACAF Champions League	Preliminary Round	(Mexico) Santos Laguna	2–1	1–3	3–4
2012–13	CONCACAF Champions League	Group Stage	(El Salvador) FAS	3–0		
2012–13	CONCACAF Champions League	Group Stage	(United States) Houston Dynamo	1–1		
2012–13	CONCACAF Champions League	Group Stage	(El Salvador) FAS		1–2	
2012–13	CONCACAF Champions League	Group Stage	(United States) Houston Dynamo		1–1	
2013–14	CONCACAF Champions League	Group Stage	(Nicaragua) Real Estelí		1–0	
2013–14	CONCACAF Champions League	Group Stage	(United States) Sporting Kansas City	0–2		
2013–14	CONCACAF Champions League	Group Stage	(Nicaragua) Real Estelí	1–0		
2013–14	CONCACAF Champions League	Group Stage	(United States) Sporting Kansas City		0–0	
2014–15	CONCACAF Champions League	Group Stage	(Guyana) Alpha United		1–0	
2014–15	CONCACAF Champions League	Group Stage	(Guyana) Alpha United	6–0		
2014–15	CONCACAF Champions League	Group Stage	(United States) Portland Timbers		2–4	
2014–15	CONCACAF Champions League	Group Stage	(United States) Portland Timbers	3–1		
2014–15	CONCACAF Champions League	Quarter-finals	(Costa Rica) Herediano	1–1	0–2	1–3
2015–16	CONCACAF Champions League	Group Stage	(United States) Seattle Sounders FC		1–2	
2015–16	CONCACAF Champions League	Group Stage	(United States) Seattle Sounders FC	1–0		
2015–16	CONCACAF Champions League	Group Stage	(Canada) Vancouver Whitecaps FC		0–1	
2015–16	CONCACAF Champions League	Group Stage	(Canada) Vancouver Whitecaps FC	1–0		
2016–17	CONCACAF Champions League	Group Stage	(Mexico) Pachuca		0–1	
2016–17	CONCACAF Champions League	Group Stage	(Belize) Police United	4–0		
2016–17	CONCACAF Champions League	Group Stage	(Belize) Police United		5–1	
2016–17	CONCACAF Champions League	Group Stage	(Mexico) Pachuca	4–4		
2017	CONCACAF League	Round of 16	(Costa Rica) Alajuelense	2–0	1–0	3–0
2017	CONCACAF League	Quarter-finals	(El Salvador) Alianza	3–1	0–1	3–2
2017	CONCACAF League	Semi-finals	(Panama) Plaza Amador	1–1	7–1	8–2
2017	CONCACAF League	Final	(Costa Rica) Santos de Guápiles	0–1	1–0	1–1
2018	CONCACAF Champions League	Round of 16	(United States) New York Red Bulls	1–1	0–2	1–3
2019	CONCACAF League	Round of 16	(Canada) Forge FC	4–1	0–1	4–2
2019	CONCACAF League	Quarter-finals	(Guatemala) Comunicaciones	2–0	0–0	2–0
2019	CONCACAF League	Semi-finals	(Costa Rica) Saprissa	2–0	1–4	3–4
2020	CONCACAF Champions League	Round of 16	(United States) Seattle Sounders FC	2–2	2–2	4–4
2020	CONCACAF Champions League	Quarter-finals	(Canada) Montreal Impact	0–1	2–1	2–2
2020	CONCACAF Champions League	Semi-finals	(Mexico) Tigres UANL		0–3	
2020	CONCACAF League	Round of 16	(Nicaragua) Managua	6–0		
2020	CONCACAF League	Quarter-finals	(Honduras) Motagua	2–0		
2020	CONCACAF League	Semi-finals	(Costa Rica) Alajuelense		0–0	
2021	CONCACAF Champions League	Round of 16	(Mexico) América	1–2	1–0	2–2
2021	CONCACAF League	Round of 16	(Suriname) Inter Moengotapoe	DSQ	6–0	DSQ
2022	CONCACAF League	Round of 16	(Guatemala) Municipal	1–0	2–2	3–2
2022	CONCACAF League	Quarter-finals	(Nicaragua) Diriangén	3–1	4–0	7–1
2022	CONCACAF League	Semi-finals	(Honduras) Motagua	1–0	0–0	1–0
2022	CONCACAF League	Final	(Costa Rica) Alajuelense	3–2	2–2	5–4
2023	CONCACAF Champions League	Round of 16	(Mexico) Atlas	4–1	0–4	4–5
2023	CONCACAF Central American Cup	Group Stage	(Panama) Independiente	1–1		
2023	CONCACAF Central American Cup	Group Stage	(Nicaragua) Real Estelí		0–1	
2023	CONCACAF Central American Cup	Group Stage	(El Salvador) FAS		4–2	
2023	CONCACAF Central American Cup	Group Stage	(Guatemala) Xelajú	2–0		
2024	CONCACAF Central American Cup	Group Stage	(Panama) Independiente	3–0		
2024	CONCACAF Central American Cup	Group Stage	(Belize) Port Layola		6–1	
2024	CONCACAF Central American Cup	Group Stage	(El Salvador) Águila		0–2	
2024	CONCACAF Central American Cup	Group Stage	(Guatemala) Antigua	1–1		
2025	CONCACAF Central American Cup	Group Stage	(Nicaragua) Real Estelí	3–0		
2025	CONCACAF Central American Cup	Group Stage	(El Salvador) Hércules		3–1	
2025	CONCACAF Central American Cup	Group Stage	(El Salvador) Águila		2–2	
2025	CONCACAF Central American Cup	Group Stage	(Guatemala) Xelajú	3–0		
2025	CONCACAF Central American Cup	Quarter-finals	(Costa Rica) Cartaginés	3–1	2–1	5–2
2025	CONCACAF Central American Cup	Semi-finals	(Costa Rica) Alajuelense	1–1	1–1	2–2
2026	CONCACAF Champions Cup	Round One	(Mexico) América	1–2	0–0	1–2
2026	CONCACAF Central American Cup	Group Stage	(Guatemala) Mixco	2–0		
2026	CONCACAF Central American Cup	Group Stage	(Panama) UMECIT		2–1	
2026	CONCACAF Central American Cup	Group Stage	(Panama) Alianza		3–1	
2026	CONCACAF Central American Cup	Group Stage	(Costa Rica) Saprissa	2–1		
2026	CONCACAF Central American Cup	Quarter-finals	(El Salvador) Firpo	3–0	3–0	6–0
2026	CONCACAF Central American Cup	Semi-finals	(Costa Rica) Cartaginés	2–2	0–1	2–3
2027	CONCACAF Champions Cup	Round One	TBD			

=== Record by opponent ===
Team	Pld	W	D	L	GF	GA	GD	WPCT
(Panama) Alianza	1	1	0	0	3	1	+2	100.00
(El Salvador) Águila	9	3	2	4	12	18	−6	33.33
(Costa Rica) Alajuelense	26	7	13	6	26	24	+2	26.92
(El Salvador) Alianza	7	6	0	1	16	5	+11	85.71
(Guyana) Alpha United	2	2	0	0	7	0	+7	100.00
(Mexico) América	8	2	2	4	7	11	−4	25.00
(Guatemala) Antigua	1	0	1	0	1	1	0	0.00
(Panama) Árabe Unido	4	3	0	1	5	2	+3	75.00
(Mexico) Atlante	2	0	1	1	1	2	−1	0.00
(Mexico) Atlas	2	1	0	1	4	5	−1	50.00
(Guatemala) Aurora	13	2	6	5	7	13	−6	15.38
(Belize) Boca Juniors	2	2	0	0	6	0	+6	100.00
(Panama) Independiente	2	1	1	0	4	1	+3	50.00
(Costa Rica) Cartaginés	5	3	1	1	10	5	+5	60.00
(Mexico) Cruz Azul	2	1	1	0	2	1	+1	50.00
(El Salvador) Hércules	1	1	0	0	3	1	+2	100.00
(El Salvador) Santiagueño	2	1	1	0	5	2	+3	50.00
(Belize) Nizhee Corozal	1	1	0	0	3	0	+3	100.00
(Canada) CF Montréal	2	1	0	1	2	2	0	50.00
(United States) Chicago Croatian	2	2	0	0	6	0	+6	100.00
(Belize) Coke Milpross	2	1	1	0	10	2	+8	50.00
(El Salvador) Cojutepeque	1	1	0	0	3	1	+2	100.00
(Guatemala) Comunicaciones	7	4	2	1	11	5	+6	57.14
(United States) D.C. United	3	0	0	3	3	8	−5	0.00
(Trinidad and Tobago) Defence Force	4	3	0	1	5	2	+3	75.00
(Nicaragua) Diriangén	4	4	0	0	12	2	+10	100.00
(Nicaragua) Santa Cecilia	2	1	0	1	4	2	+2	50.00
(Belize) Eagles	2	2	0	0	4	0	+4	100.00
(Costa Rica) Belén	1	1	0	0	1	0	+1	100.00
(Nicaragua) Real Estelí	4	3	0	1	5	1	+4	75.00
(El Salvador) FAS	9	7	0	2	21	10	+11	77.78
(El Salvador) Firpo	8	3	3	2	10	7	+3	37.50
(Canada) Forge FC	2	1	0	1	4	2	+2	50.00
(Guatemala) Galcasa	1	1	0	0	1	0	+1	100.00
(Costa Rica) Santos de Guápiles	2	1	0	1	1	1	0	50.00
(Costa Rica) Herediano	12	4	3	5	12	15	−3	33.33
(United States) Houston Dynamo FC	2	0	2	0	2	2	0	0.00
(Suriname) Inter Moengotapoe	1	1	0	0	6	0	+6	100.00
(Trinidad and Tobago) Joe Public	2	2	0	0	7	1	+6	100.00
(Belize) Juventus	1	1	0	0	2	0	+2	100.00
(United States) LA Galaxy	1	0	0	1	2	3	−1	0.00
(Nicaragua) Managua	1	1	0	0	6	0	+6	100.00
(Honduras) Marathón	4	1	3	0	5	4	+1	25.00
(Guatemala) Mixco	1	1	0	0	2	0	+2	100.00
(Mexico) Monterrey	2	0	1	1	2	3	−1	0.00
(Honduras) Motagua	6	3	2	1	5	2	+3	50.00
(Canada) Montreal Impact	2	0	1	1	2	3	−1	0.00
(Guatemala) Municipal	22	6	8	8	22	23	−1	27.27
(United States) New York Red Bulls	2	0	1	1	1	3	−2	0.00
(Mexico) Pachuca	3	1	1	1	8	5	+3	33.33
(Panama) Panamá Viejo	1	1	0	0	5	0	+5	100.00
(Belize) Port Layola	1	1	0	0	6	1	+5	100.00
(Panama) Plaza Amador	3	2	1	0	14	2	+12	66.67
(El Salvador) Platense	1	0	1	0	3	3	0	0.00
(Belize) Police United	2	2	0	0	9	1	+8	100.00
(United States) Portland Timbers	2	1	0	1	5	5	0	50.00
Puerto Rico Islanders	2	1	1	0	4	1	+3	50.00
(Mexico) Pumas UNAM	4	0	2	2	3	9	−6	0.00
(Costa Rica) Puntarenas	3	2	0	1	7	5	+2	66.67
(Honduras) Real España	10	4	4	2	12	9	+3	40.00
(Suriname) Robinhood	2	1	1	0	1	0	+1	50.00
(Mexico) Santos Laguna	2	1	0	1	3	4	−1	50.00
(Costa Rica) Saprissa	16	6	2	8	21	27	−6	37.50
(United States) Seattle Sounders FC	4	1	2	1	6	6	0	25.00
(Panama) San Francisco	3	0	1	2	0	2	−2	0.00
(United States) San Jose Earthquakes	2	0	0	2	1	4	−3	0.00
(United States) Sporting Kansas City	2	0	1	1	0	2	−2	0.00
(Guatemala) Suchitepéquez	6	4	1	1	13	4	+9	66.67
(Mexico) Tigres UANL	3	0	0	3	1	6	−5	0.00
(Mexico) Toluca	7	3	1	3	6	10	−4	42.86
(Panama) UMECIT	1	1	0	0	2	1	+1	100.00
(Costa Rica) Uruguay de Coronado	2	0	0	2	1	4	−3	0.00
(Canada) Vancouver Whitecaps FC	2	1	0	1	1	1	0	50.00
(Belize) Verdes	2	2	0	0	3	0	+3	100.00
(Honduras) Victoria	2	1	1	0	4	2	+2	50.00
(Guatemala) Xelajú	4	3	1	0	7	1	+6	75.00
Total	297	132	77	88	447	311	+136	44.44

Source: Results

== Club records ==
=== Top goalscorers ===
As of 23 August 2024

Players in bold are still present in club.

Rank	Scorer	Goals	Apps
1	(Honduras) Wilmer Velásquez	196	392
2	(Honduras) Jerry Bengtson	196	294
3	(Brazil) Denilson Costa	99	262
4	(Argentina) Danilo Tosello	86	298
5	(Honduras) Prudencio "Tecate" Norales	76	189
6	(Honduras) Roger Rojas	70	122
7	(Honduras) Rigoberto "Shula" Gomez	63
8	(Honduras) Juan "Matador" Flores	57
9	(Honduras) Alex Pineda Chacón	52	129
10	(Honduras) Jorge González	46	144

== List of coaches ==
- (Chile) Jose Matera
- (Chile) Jaime Ramírez Banda
- (Netherlands) Gerck Block (1992–1993)
- (Honduras) Juan Andino (1965)
- (Honduras) Mario Griffin (1966–68)
- (Honduras) Carlos Suazo (1969)
- (Honduras) Chelato Uclés (1970–71)
- (Colombia) Carlos Viera (1971)
- (Chile) Claudio Ramírez Banda (1975)
- (Honduras) Carlos Cruz Carranza (1977)
- (Uruguay) Luis Cubilla (1979–80)
- (Uruguay) José Luis Mattera Teglia (1982)
- (Honduras) Enrique Grey (1984)
- (Chile) Néstor Matamala (1986)
- (Honduras) Carlos Padilla (1987)
- (Uruguay) Estanislao Malinowski (1988–89)
- (Uruguay) Luis Cubilla (1988–93)
- (Honduras) Chelato Uclés (1992–94)
- (Uruguay) Estanislao Malinowski (1994)
- (Brazil) Flavio Ortega (1995–1997)
- (Uruguay) Luis Cubilla (1995–02)
- (Honduras) Chelato Uclés (1996–98)
- (Honduras) Gilberto Yearwood (1997–98)
- (Argentina) Francisco Sá (1998)
- (Uruguay) Julio González (1999), (2000)
- (Uruguay) Ernesto Omar Luzardo
- (Honduras) Edwin Pavón (A. 2000–01)
- (Honduras) Juan Carlos Espinoza (A. 2002–03)
- (Honduras) Chelato Uclés (C. 2003–04)
- (Mexico) Alejandro Dominguez (2004)
- (Honduras) Nahúm Espinoza (2004–06)
- (Mexico) Juan de Dios Castillo (C. 2007–08)
- (Honduras) Juan Carlos Espinoza (A. 2008–09)
- (Colombia) Carlos Restrepo (C. Jan 2010 – March 11)
- (Honduras) Juan Carlos Espinoza (March 11 – June 11)
- (Argentina) Danilo Tosello (A. July 2011–1?)
- (Honduras) Oscar Salgado (2013)
- (Argentina) Héctor Vargas (2013–2017)
- (Colombia) Carlos Restrepo ( – Mar 2018)
- (Honduras) Nahúm Espinoza (Mar 2018 – Oct 2018)
- (Uruguay) Manuel Keosseián (Oct 2018– Jun 2019)
- (Argentina) Pedro Troglio (Jul 2019–Dec 2021)
- (Argentina) Pablo Lavallén (Jan 2022– May 2022)
- (Argentina) Pedro Troglio (June 2022 - December 2024)
- (Uruguay) Eduardo Espinel (December 2024 - Present)
