= 1998 CONCACAF Cup Winners Cup =

- Dates: 1998; 27 years ago

Final positions
- Champions: Abandoned

The 1998 CONCACAF Cup Winners Cup was the seventh edition of this defunct tournament contended between 1991 and 1998. After this season the tournament was re-branded as CONCACAF Giants Cup for the 2001 season.

== Qualifying rounds ==
=== Central Zone ===
==== Group A ====
March 18, 1998

(Guatemala) C.D. Suchitepéquez	2–0	(El Salvador) C.D. Águila

March 25, 1998

(El Salvador) C.D. Águila	1–0	(Guatemala) C.D. Suchitepéquez

April 9, 1998

(Guatemala) C.D. Suchitepéquez	1–0	(Guatemala) C.S.D. Municipal

April 15, 1998

(El Salvador) C.D. Águila	3–0	(Guatemala) C.S.D. Municipal

April 22, 1998

(Guatemala) C.S.D. Municipal	1–1	(El Salvador) C.D. Águila

August 16, 1998

Juventus F.C. (Belize)	0–0	(Guatemala) C.S.D. Municipal

August 19, 1998

(Guatemala) C.S.D. Municipal	1–0	Juventus F.C. (Belize)

August 23, 1998

(Guatemala) C.D. Suchitepéquez	3–2	Juventus F.C. (Belize)

August 26, 1998

(El Salvador) C.D. Águila	3–0	Juventus F.C. (Belize)

Juventus F.C. (Belize)	0–3*	(El Salvador) C.D. Águila

Juventus F.C. (Belize)	0–3*	(Guatemala) C.D. Suchitepéquez

(Guatemala) C.S.D. Municipal	w.o.	(Guatemala) C.D. Suchitepéquez

Both teams left the tournament

Pos	Team	Pld	W	D	L	GF	GA	GD	Pts
1	(El Salvador) C.D. Águila	6	4	1	1	11	3	+8	13
2	(Guatemala) C.D. Suchitepéquez	5	4	0	1	9	3	+6	12
3	(Guatemala) C.S.D. Municipal	5	1	2	2	2	5	−3	5
4	Juventus F.C. (Belize)	6	0	1	5	2	13	−11	1

- Juventus were disqualified and forfeited their remaining matches (vs Águila and Suchitepéquez at home; it is assumed both matches were awarded 0–3)

==== Group B ====
Was to be played in Honduras between: Platense F.C., (Nicaragua) Cacique Diriangén, (Costa Rica) C.S. Herediano, and (Panama) Tauro F.C..

Tournament was abandoned (making it the third consecutive CONCACAF Cup Winners' Cup tournament which was started but not finished).
