= 1997 CONCACAF Cup Winners Cup =

1997 CONCACAF Cup Winners' Cup
- Dates: May 1998 – April 1998

Final positions
- Champions: Abandoned

The 1997 CONCACAF Cup Winners' Cup was the sixth edition of this defunct tournament contended between 1991 and 1998.

== Qualifying rounds ==
=== Northern Zone ===
- Dallas Burn (USA) bye to final round.
- Cruz Azul (Mexico) bye to final round.
- Club Necaxa (Mexico) bye to final round.

=== Central Zone ===
==== First round ====
Plaza Amador qualified for second round as well, opposition unknown. Olimpia and Municipal, who had reached the Cuadrangular Final of the abandoned 1996 edition, got byes into the second round.

1997	FAS (El Salvador)	2–2	(Guatemala) Amatitlán

28 May 1997	Amatitlán (Guatemala)	0–0 (2–2 agg.) (4–3 p)	(El Salvador) FAS

Amatitlán qualified for Next Round

28 May 1997	Belén (Costa Rica)	2–1	(Nicaragua) Diriangén

15 June 1997	Diriangén (Nicaragua)	2–3 (3–5 agg.)	(Costa Rica) Belén

Belén qualified for Next Round

28 June 1997	Juventus (Belize)	1–0	(Honduras) Platense
	Núñez 42'

6 July 1997	Platense (Honduras)	4–1 (4–2 agg.)	(Belize) Juventus
	Ávila 31'; Clavasquín 33'; Cárcamo 35'; Perdomo 79'		85' McAllister

Platense qualified for Next Round

==== Second round ====
Jong Colombia replaced Amatitlán.

January 25, 1998

(Honduras) Olimpia	3–0	(Costa Rica) Belén

Estadio Francisco Morazán, San Pedro Sula

Olimpia qualified for Next Round

February 12, 1998

(Curaçao) Jong Colombia	1-3	(Honduras) Platense

Estadio Francisco Morazán, San Pedro Sula
March 11, 1998

(Honduras) Platense	7–0	(Curaçao) Jong Colombia

Estadio Excélsior, Puerto Cortés

Platense qualified for Next Round

January 25, 1998

(Panama) Plaza Amador	0–1	(Guatemala) Municipal

January 28, 1998

(Guatemala) Municipal	2–0	(Panama) Plaza Amador

Municipal qualified for Next Round

=== Caribbean Zone ===
Won by Jong Colombia; instead of qualifying for the final round as originally planned, they were added to the second round of the central zone.

== Final round ==
The final round was originally scheduled for March 1998 in Dallas with quarterfinal fixtures of Necaxa–Olimpia and Platense–Municipal; winners of the first were to play Cruz Azul in the semifinal, while winners of the second were to play Dallas Burn in the second semifinal. The format was changed for "scheduling and technical reasons".

The Dallas Burn hosted the CONCACAF Cup Winners' Cup tournament at the Cotton Bowl in Dallas on March 4, 6 and 8. The six-team tournament, was going to consist of three doubleheaders. It was going to feature Dallas Burn, defending champion Necaxa, 1997 Mexican Cup champion Cruz Azul, and Olimpia who had defeated Belen.

The two remaining spots were going to be filled by the winner of the Municipal–Plaza Amador match and the winner of the Platense–Jong Colombia match. "This is a tremendous honor to host this tournament and an extremely high level of competition", said Burn GM Billy Hicks. "Necaxa, Cruz Azul and Olimpia are some of the best, most decorated champions on this half of the planet."

=== Group North ===
March 4, 1998

Dallas Burn	1–4	Necaxa
Dante Washington 57'		Luis Hernández 7'; Pedro Pineda 45' (pen.), 56'; Edson Alvarado 58'

Cotton Bowl, Dallas

March 8, 1998

Dallas Burn	1–2	Cruz Azul
Dante Washington 56'		Héctor Altamirano 42'; Juan Francisco Palencia 65'

Cotton Bowl, Dallas

March 11, 1998

Cruz Azul	1–1	Necaxa
Julio César Yegros 24'	Also a Mexican league match	Luis Hernández 34'

Estadio Azteca, México City

Pos	Team	Pld	W	D	L	GF	GA	GD	Pts
1	(Mexico) Necaxa	2	1	1	0	5	2	+3	4
2	(Mexico) Cruz Azul	2	1	1	0	3	2	+1	4
3	(United States) Dallas Burn	2	0	0	2	2	6	−4	0

=== Group South ===
March 5, 1998

Platense	3–3	Olimpia

Estadio Excélsior, Puerto Cortés

March 8, 1998

Olimpia	2–1	Municipal
Wilmer Velasquez; Denilson Costa		Guillermo Ramirez

Estadio Nacional Chelato Uclés, Tegucigalpa

April 1, 1998

Municipal	0–0	Platense

Estadio Doroteo Guamuch Flores, Guatemala City

Pos	Team	Pld	W	D	L	GF	GA	GD	Pts
1	(Honduras) Olimpia	2	1	1	0	5	4	+1	4
2	(Honduras) Platense	2	0	2	0	3	3	0	2
3	(Guatemala) Municipal	2	0	1	1	1	2	−1	1

== Final ==
April 1998

(Honduras) Olimpia	Abandoned	(Mexico) Necaxa
	Final never played, tournament tacitly abandoned.
