= Miguel García (footballer, born 1971) =

Mexican footballer and manager (born 1971)

Personal information
- Full name: Miguel García Zúñiga
- Date of birth: 11 August 1971 (age 55)
- Place of birth: Guadalajara, Jalisco, Mexico
- Height: 1.78 m (5 ft 10 in)
- Position: Defender

Senior career*
| Years | Team | Apps | (Gls) |
| 1994–1998 | Monterrey | | |
| 1998–2003 | Santos Laguna | | |
| 2003–2004 | Trotamundos de Tijuana | | |

Managerial career
- 2006–2011: Santos Laguna Reserves and Academy
- 2011: Santos Laguna (Assistant)
- 2011–2012: Santos Laguna Reserves and Academy
- 2013–2015: Santos Laguna (Assistant)
- 2016: Santos Laguna Premier
- 2016: Tampico Madero
- 2017–2018: Santos Laguna Premier
- * Club domestic league appearances and goals

Miguel García Zúñiga (born 11 August 1971) is a Mexican former footballer who last played for Trotamundos de Tijuana and current manager of Ascenso MX club Tampico Madero.
