= Fabián Guevara =

Chilean footballer (born 1968)

Personal information
- Full name: Fabián Rodrigo Guevara Arredondo
- Date of birth: June 22, 1968 (age 58)
- Place of birth: Santiago, Chile
- Height: 1.78 m (5 ft 10 in)
- Positions: Defender; midfielder

Senior career*
| Years | Team | Apps | (Gls) |
| 1986–1991 | Palestino | | |
| 1992–1994 | Universidad de Chile | | |
| 1994–1996 | Monterrey | | |
| 1996 | Colo-Colo | | |
| 1997–1998 | Deportes Concepción | | |

International career
| 1991–1995 | Chile | 20 | (1) |
- * Club domestic league appearances and goals

Fabián Rodrigo Guevara Arredondo (born June 22, 1968) is a retired Chilean footballer who played as a defender and midfielder during his career. His debut in the Chile national side was on April 9, 1991. He made a total of twenty caps (one goal).

== Honours ==
=== Club ===
Universidad de Chile

- Primera División de Chile (1): 1994

Colo-Colo

- Primera División de Chile (1): 1996
- Copa Chile (1): 1996
