= Ricalde Stadium =

Football stadium in Corozal Town, Belize

Coordinates: 18.400746°N 88.384016°W

- Interactive map of Ricalde Stadium
- Location: Corozal Town, Belize
- Owner: Corozal Town
- Operator: Nizhee Corozal FC
- Capacity: 1000
- Surface: Grass

Tenants
- Nizhee Corozal FC

The Ricalde Stadium is a football stadium and venue located in Corozal Town, Belize and can hold up to 1,000 spectators.

Its dominant use is for football games, but occasionally hosts other miscellaneous events, such as the Band Fest 2014 moved from the Orange Walk People's Stadium to be scheduled at this venue.

== Facilities ==
Apparently, this ground lacks many elements of a stadium- there are no concession or refreshment stands, touchlines or team stores but there are floodlights and bleachers.
