= Roberto Gasparini =

Argentine footballer and manager

Personal information
- Full name: Roberto Daniel Gasparini Pamich
- Date of birth: January 5, 1958 (age 68)
- Place of birth: Córdoba, Argentina
- Position: Midfielder

Senior career*
Years	Team	Apps	(Gls)
1978–1985	Racing de Córdoba	190	(76)
1985–1986	Junior de Barranquilla		(?)
1987–1988	Necaxa	58	(14)
1988–1989	Necaxa	33	(6)
1989–1993	Tigres de la UANL	161	(39)
1994	Monterrey	9	(0)
1995	Talleres de Córdoba	18	(5)
1995–1996	Estudiantes (RC)	?	(?)
- * Club domestic league appearances and goals

Roberto Daniel Gasparini (born 5 January 1958 in Córdoba) is a former Argentine footballer. He is currently working as the manager of Estudiantes de Río Cuarto in the lower leagues of Argentine football.

== Life ==
Gasparini started his professional career in 1978 with Racing de Córdoba . In 1980 they reached the final of the Nacional championship only to lose to Rosario Central.

In 1986 Gasparini moved to Rosario Central, he was part of their championship winning team in the 1986–1987 season.

Gasparini moved to Mexico in 1989 to play for Necaxa, Tigres de la UANL and Monterrey . He returned to Argentina in 1995, he played for Talleres de Córdoba and then Estudiantes de Río Cuarto, retiring in 1996.

== Titles ==
Season	Team	Title
1986–1987	Rosario Central	Primera División Argentina
