= 1995 CONCACAF Cup Winners Cup =

- Dates: April 19, 1995 - April 4 1996

Final positions
- Champions: (Mexico) UAG (1st title)
- Runners-up: (El Salvador) Luis Ángel Firpo
- Third place: (Honduras) Marathón

The 1995 CONCACAF Cup Winners Cup was the fourth edition of this defunct tournament contended between 1991 and 1998.

== Preliminary round ==
=== North American Zone ===
(United States) Greek Americans withdrew.
(Mexico) UAG qualified for Final Round.

=== Central American Zone A ===
19 April 1995

(El Salvador) Luis Ángel Firpo	8–0	(Nicaragua) FC San Marcos

Estadio Sergio Torres, Usulután
9 May 1995

(Nicaragua) FC San Marcos	1–2	(El Salvador) Luis Ángel Firpo

Estadio Stanley Cayasso, Managua

Luis Ángel Firpo qualified for Final Round.

=== Central American Zone B ===
==== First round ====
14 March 1995

(Honduras) Marathón	4–0	(Panama) Cosmos FC

Estadio Francisco Morazán, San Pedro Sula
16 March 1995

(Panama) Cosmos FC	4–1	(Honduras) Marathón

Estadio Francisco Morazán, San Pedro Sula

Marathón qualified for Next Round

2 April 1995

(Belize) Acros Crystal	2–3	(Guatemala) Suchitepéquez

Estadio Francisco Morazán, San Pedro Sula
12 April 1995

(Guatemala) Suchitepéquez	2–2	(Belize) Acros Crystal

Estadio Francisco Morazán, San Pedro Sula

Suchitepéquez qualified for Next Round

==== Second round ====
16 July 1995

(Guatemala) Suchitepéquez	1–1	(Honduras) Marathón

Estadio Carlos Salazar Hijo, Mazatenango
22 July 1995

(Honduras) Marathón	5–0	(Guatemala) Suchitepéquez

Estadio Francisco Morazán, San Pedro Sula

Marathón qualified for Final Round.

=== Caribbean Zone ===
==== First round ====
8 March 1995

(Guadeloupe) Arsenal	1–0	(Aruba) RCA

Stade René Serge Nabajoth, Les Abymes
25 March 1995

(Aruba) RCA	1–2	(Guadeloupe) Arsenal

Ergilio Hato Stadium, Willemstad

Arsenal qualified for Next Round

22 March 1995

(French Guiana) CSC de Cayenne	3–1	(Curaçao) Jong Colombia

Stade de Baduel, Cayenne
5 April 1995

(Curaçao) Jong Colombia	5–0	(French Guiana) CSC de Cayenne

Ergilio Hato Stadium, Willemstad

Jong Colombia qualified for Next Round

(Haiti) FICA withdrew (Guyana) Western Tigers FC

Western Tigers FC qualified for Next Round

==== Second round ====
19 May 1995

(Curaçao) Jong Colombia	2–1	(Guadeloupe) Arsenal

Ergilio Hato Stadium, Willemstad
10 June 1995

(Guadeloupe) Arsenal	0–0	(Curaçao) Jong Colombia

Stade René Serge Nabajoth, Les Abymes

Jong Colombia qualified for Next Round

(Martinique) Robert withdrew (Guyana) Western Tigers FC

Western Tigers FC qualified.

==== Third round ====
23 September 1995

(Curaçao) Jong Colombia	5–3	(Guyana) Western Tigers FC

Ergilio Hato Stadium, Willemstad
30 September 1995

(Guyana) Western Tigers FC	1–1	(Curaçao) Jong Colombia

Stade de Baduel, Cayenne

(Curaçao) Jong Colombia qualified for Final Round.

== Semifinals ==
2 April 1996

(Mexico) UAG	2–1	(Honduras) Marathón
Felipe Del Ángel Malibrán 22'; Eustacio Rizo Escote 89'		Jurandy De Jesus Damacena 89'

Santa Ana Stadium, Santa Ana, California

2 April 1996

(El Salvador) Luis Ángel Firpo	8–0	(Curaçao) Jong Colombia
Julio Millán 11'; Ari Da Silva 15', 63', 83'; Klay Marzón 21', 75'; Pedro Vásquez 40', 57'

Santa Ana Stadium, Santa Ana, California

== Third Place ==
4 April 1996

(Honduras) Marathón	12–0	(Curaçao) Jong Colombia
Byron Suazo 1'; Otavio Santana 7', 14', 17', 37', 61', 76', 82'; Luis Perdomo 12'; Pompilio Cacho 22'; Mario Beata 66'; Jose Christiano Pinheiro De Araujo 78'

Santa Ana Stadium, Santa Ana, California

== Final ==
4 April 1996

(Mexico) UAG	2–1	(El Salvador) Luis Ángel Firpo
Felipe Del Ángel Malibrán 24'; Agustín García 88'		Geovani Trigueros 34'

Santa Ana Stadium, Santa Ana, California
Attendance: 4,200
Referee: (United States) Arturo Angeles

Carlos Briones
Mauricio Gómez
Sergio Gómez	(substituted off) 57'
Gilberto Adame
Markus López
Mauricio Gallaga
Felipe Del Ángel Malibrán	24'
Flavio Davino
Hector Enriquez Rosales
Angel Monares	(substituted off) 66'
Luis Armando González	(substituted off) 57'
Substitutions:
Agustín García	88'	(substituted on) 57'
Eustacio Rizo Escote	(substituted on) 57'
Juan Parra	(substituted on) 66'

Misael Alfaro
Geovani Trigueros	34'
Leonel Carcamo
Julio Millán
Pedro Vásquez
Raul Toro
Juan García Gamez
Mauricio D'Santo
Ari Da Silva
Fernando Lazo
Klay Marzón	(substituted off) 46'
Substitutions:
Celio Rodríguez Da Silva	(substituted on) 46'

== Champion ==
CONCACAF Cup Winners' Cup
1995 winners
(Mexico)
UAG
First title
