= Raúl Aredes =

Argentine footballer

Personal information
- Full name: Raúl Heriberto Aredes
- Date of birth: 14 December 1965 (age 60)
- Place of birth: San Miguel de Tucumán, Argentina
- Height: 1.73 m (5 ft 8 in)
- Position: Midfielder

Senior career*
Years	Team	Apps	(Gls)
1983–1989	Tucumán		
1989–1990	Unión Santa Fe	26	(1)
1990–1992	Estudiantes LP	63	(12)
1992–1993	Deportivo Cali	37	(3)
1994	Universidad de Chile	27	(3)
1995–1996	Monterrey	55	(7)
1997	La Serena	25	(3)
1998–1999	Tucumán		
1999	San Martín SJ	11	(0)
2000–2001	Tucumán		

Managerial career
- 2001: Atlético Tucumán
- 2002–2003: Atlético Tucumán
- 2005: Atlético Tucumán
- 2007: Central Norte
- 2007: La Florida
- 2011: Unión Temuco (assistant)
- 2011–2013: Mitre
- 2013–2014: Mitre
- 2015: Vélez San Ramón
- 2016: Atlético Tucumán (assistant)
- 2017: Huracán (assistant)
- 2020–2021: Unión Santa Fe (assistant)
- 2022: Atlético Tucumán (assistant)
- 2024–: Atlético Tucumán (youth)
- * Club domestic league appearances and goals

Raúl Heriberto Aredes (born 14 December 1965) is an Argentine football manager and former midfielder who played in clubs of Argentina, Chile, Mexico and Colombia.

== Career ==
In Chile, Aredes played for Universidad de Chile and Deportes La Serena in the top level.

As a football manager, he has led clubs in Argentina such as Atlético Tucumán, Mitre, La Florida from Tucumán, among others. He has also served as assistant coach for clubs in his homeland and the Chilean side Unión Temuco.

In 2018, Aredes served as technical manager of Chilean club Deportes Temuco.

== Honours ==
Atlético Tucumán

- Torneo Interior (1): 1987

Universidad de Chile

- Primera División de Chile (1): 1994
