= CONCACAF Cup Winners Cup =

- Organizer(s): CONCACAF
- Founded: 1991; 35 years ago
- Abolished: 1998; 28 years ago
- Region: North America; Central America; Caribbean
- Related competitions: CONCACAF Giants Cup; CONCACAF League
- Last champion(s): (Mexico) Tecos (1st title)
- Most championships: (El Salvador) Atlético Marte (Mexico) Monterrey (Mexico) Necaxa (Mexico) Tecos (1 title each)

The CONCACAF Cup Winners Cup was an international association football competition organized by CONCACAF as its secondary continental tournament for clubs from North America, Central America and the Caribbean. It was held from 1991 to 1998, although the last 3 editions were declared unfinished. The participating clubs were the champions of the national cup tournaments.

== Results ==
Year	Champions	Results	Runners-up
1991	(El Salvador) Atlético Marte	Final group	(Guatemala) Comunicaciones
1993	(Mexico) Monterrey	Final group	(Honduras) RCD España
1994	(Mexico) Necaxa	3–0	(Guatemala) Aurora
1995	(Mexico) Tecos	2–1	(El Salvador) Luis Ángel Firpo
1996	The tournament was unfinished, only the preliminary round was played		
1997	The tournament was unfinished, the final match was not played		
1998	The tournament was unfinished, only the Central American zone was played		

== Performances ==
Performance by club
Club	Titles	Runners-up	Years won	Years runners-up
(El Salvador) Atlético Marte	1	0	1991	–
(Mexico) Monterrey	1	0	1993	–
(Mexico) Necaxa	1	0	1994	–
(Mexico) Tecos	1	0	1995	–
(Guatemala) Comunicaciones	0	1	–	1991
(Honduras) RCD España	0	1	–	1993
(Guatemala) Aurora	0	1	–	1994
(El Salvador) Luis Ángel Firpo	0	1	–	1995

Performance by nation
Nation	Titles	Runners-up	Total
Mexico	3	0	3
El Salvador	1	1	2
Guatemala	0	2	2
Honduras	0	1	1

== Top goalscorers ==
Year	Footballer	Club	Goals
1991	(Guatemala) Marcelo Bauzá	(Guatemala) Comunicaciones	7
1993	(Honduras) Carlos Pavón	(Honduras) Real España	7
1994	(Argentina) Ivo Basay	(Mexico) Necaxa	3
1995	(Honduras) Ottavio Santana	(Honduras) Marathón	9
1997	(Honduras) Wilmer Velásquez	(Honduras) Olimpia	6

== See also ==
- CONCACAF Central American Cup
- CONCACAF Champions Cup
- CONCACAF Caribbean Cup
- CONCACAF Giants Cup
- CONCACAF League
- Leagues Cup
- CONCACAF
