= Sergio Verdirame =

Argentine footballer (born 1970)

Personal information
- Full name: Sergio Ariel Verdirame Serpentiello
- Date of birth: 18 August 1970 (age 56)
- Place of birth: Santa Fe, Argentina
- Height: 1.69 m (5 ft 7 in)
- Position: Forward

Team information
- Current team: Aniquiladores FC (seven-a-side) (coach)

Senior career*
Years	Team	Apps	(Gls)
1988–1990	Colón	98	(27)
1990–1991	Colo-Colo	1	(1)
1991–1992	Monarcas Morelia	38	(16)
1992–1996	Monterrey	131	(44)
1996–1997	Cruz Azul	31	(4)
1997–1998	Santos Laguna	31	(6)
1999	Veracruz	11	(3)
2002	Monterrey	2	(1)

Managerial career
- 2003: Zacatepec (assistant)
- 2004: Leones Morelos (assistant)
- 2004: Monarcas Morelia (assistant)
- 2005–2007: Monterrey (assistant)
- 2011–2012: Colón (assistant)
- 2023–: Aniquiladores FC (seven-a-side)
- 2025–: Colombia (seven-a-side)
- * Club domestic league appearances and goals

Sergio Ariel Verdirame Serpentiello (born 18 August 1970) is an Argentine former professional footballer who played as a forward for clubs of Argentina, Chile and Mexico. He is currently the head coach of seven-a-side football club Aniquiladores FC in the Kings League Américas.

== Playing career ==
Verdirame was born in Santa Fe, Argentina, and began his career with Colón. He later moved to Colo-Colo in Chile, where he was part of the team that won the 1991 Copa Libertadores. In 1991, he transferred to Monarcas Morelia in Mexico, scoring 16 goals in 38 matches, his most prolific season.

In 1992, Verdirame joined Monterrey and spent four seasons with the team. Afterward, he played for Cruz Azul and Santos Laguna before returning to Monterrey in 2002, where he retired.

== Managerial career ==
In 2023, Verdirame was appointed head coach of Aniquiladores FC in the Kings League.

In November 2024, Verdirame was announced as the head coach of the Colombian national team for the upcoming Kings World Cup Nations, a tournament featuring streamers and content creators. This appointment marks a significant step in his coaching career, expanding his influence beyond club management to the international stage.

== Honours ==
=== National Titles ===
- Copa México: 1996
- Chilean Championship: 1990, 1991 (with Colo-Colo)

=== International Titles ===
- Copa Libertadores: 1991 (with Colo-Colo)
- CONCACAF Champions' Cup: 1996 (with Cruz Azul)
- Recopa de la Concacaf: 1993 (with Monterrey)
