= Careca Bianchezi =

Brazilian footballer (born 1964)

Personal information
- Full name: Carlos Alberto Bianchezi
- Date of birth: 25 August 1964 (age 62)
- Place of birth: São Paulo, Brazil
- Position: Striker

Senior career*
Years	Team	Apps	(Gls)
1985–1987	Marília		
1988	Guarani	19	(?)
1989–1991	Palmeiras	43	(19)
1991–1992	Atalanta	29	(8)
1992–1995	Monterrey	84	(25)
1995–1996	CD Veracruz	12	(4)
1997	Monterrey	16	(1)

International career
1990–1991	Brazil	10	(1)
- * Club domestic league appearances and goals

Carlos Alberto Bianchezi (born 25 August 1964), known as Careca Bianchezi or Careca III, is a Brazilian former professional footballer who played as a striker.

== Club career ==
In his club career, Bianchezi played for Brazilian sides Marília, Guarani, and Palmeiras, as well as in Italy for Atalanta and in Mexico for C.F. Monterrey.

== International career ==
At the international level, Bianchezi was part of the Brazil squad who finished as runners-up to Argentina at the 1991 Copa América.
