= FC Industriales =

Cuban football club

Industriales
- Full name: Industriales
- Ground: Campo Armada; Havana, Cuba
- League: Campeonato Nacional de Fútbol
- 2007/08: 4nd in Group B
Home colours

Industriales is a Cuban football team playing at the top level. It is based in Havana. Their home stadium is Campo Armada. Founded on November 29, 1912, one of the first clubs made in the country.

== Players ==
Note: Flags indicate national team as defined under FIFA eligibility rules; some limited exceptions apply. Players may hold more than one non-FIFA nationality.

No.	Pos.	Nation	Player
—	DF	PER	Carlos Sanchèz
—	DF	CUB	Dino Corugedo
—	MF	CUB	Yosmel Perez
—	MF	CUB	Lian Perez
—	MF	CUB	Eduardo Salgado
—	MF	CUB	Osay Martinez
—	FW	CUB	Pedro Dario Suarez
—	FW	CUB	Randy Lizama

== Achievements ==
- Campeonato Nacional de Fútbol de Cuba: 4

1963, 1964, 1972, 1973
