= Nizhee Corozal FC =

Belizean football club

Nizhee Corozal F.C.
- Full name: Nizhee Corozal Football Club
- Nickname(s): Corozaleños
- Founded: 1985
- Ground: Ricalde Stadium; Corozal Town, Belize
- Capacity: 1,000
- League: Belize Premier Football League
Home colours	Away colours

La Victoria/Corozal Football Club is a Belizean football team which competed in the Belize Premier Football League (BPFL) of the Football Federation of Belize. It was founded as La Victoria FC in 1985. After the dismantling of the first division, to give way to newly created Semi-Pro league, La Victoria took on the brilliant idea of combining and bringing the best talent from every club and forming a highly competitive team. Their idea paid off and soon they would find themselves scouting and recruiting players from around the district; this brought forward the emergence of talented players of the like of Gerardo Campos (Caledonia), Ariel Magana (Ranchito), Steve Hall (Calcutta), Ramiro ‘Milo’ Munoz (Xaibe), Clifford ‘Calvo’ Usher (Freedom Fighters) Pelon Barahona (Beach Boys); to name a few.

The team first battled San Joaquin FC for north supremacy and they added Mexican players who solidified the team and took them to become a powerhouse in Belizean football. La Victoria would dominate the football scene in the mid to late 90’s. They won the Semi-Pro championship with an outstanding display of football. In the international scene they went on the win several key matches allowing them to move on to the next round in the Concacaf Champion of champion league; notably beating Nicaragua’s Dirigian Gen.

The team continued their dominance along with their upbringing of new and talented players; the likes of Joe West, Roberto ‘Berti’ Campos, Delmar Sutherland (RIP) as well as additional Mexican players. However, their new challenger was up and coming Juventus FC of Orange Walk. Both teams boasted some of the most talented players. Their matches were fierce and epic; the stadiums were packed on Sunday. Both clubs marked a special time in Belizean football which stands alone in a unique category that no one will ever forget or come close to recreating. They were nicknamed the Glory Guys.

The team is based in Corozal Town. Their home stadium is Ricalde Stadium.

== Previous names ==
- 1991–95 – La Victoria FC
- 1997–98 – CFC Corozal Football Club
- 1998–99 – Midsouth FC
- 1999-01 – La Victoria Dolphins FC
- 2001–02 – Sagitun FC
- 2002–03 – Corozal Victory FC
- 2008–09 – Nizhee Corozal FC

== Achievements ==
- Belize Premier Football League: 3
  1991–92, 1993–94 as La Victoria FC, 2009 (Spring)

== Top scorers ==
- 1993–94 – Denmark Casey (La Victoria FC) – 9 goals – Runner-up
- 1994–95 – Jason Hall (La Victoria FC) – 6 goals – Runner-up
- 1996–97 – David McCauley (FC Corozal) – 14 – Top scorer
- 1997–98 – Oliver Hendricks (FC Corozal) – 7 goals – Runner-up
- 1998–99 – Oliver Hendricks (La Victoria Dolphins) – 14 goals – Top scorer
- 2002–03 – Rupert Smith (Corozal Victory FC) – 6 goals – Runner-up

== Notable squad Members ==
Note: Flags indicate national team as defined under FIFA eligibility rules; some limited exceptions apply. Players may hold more than one non-FIFA nationality.

No.	Pos.	Nation	Player
—	GK	(Belize) BLZ	Delmar Sutherland
—	DF	(Mexico) MEX	Carlos Baragan
—	DF	(Honduras) HON	Pablo Madrid
—	DF	(Belize) BLZ	Gerardo Campos
—	DF	(Belize) BLZ	Roberto Campos
—	MF	(Belize) BLZ	Orlando Vega
—	MF	(Belize) BLZ	Ariel Magana
—	MF	(Belize) BLZ	Ramiro Muñoz
—	FW	(Belize) BLZ	Pedro Barahona

No.	Pos.	Nation	Player
—	MF	(Belize) BLZ	Cesario Rosales
—	FW	(Mexico) MEX	Yeyo
—	MF	(Belize) BLZ	Edmund Pandy
—	FW	(Belize) BLZ	Clifford Usher
—	FW	(Belize) BLZ	Joe West
—	DF	(Belize) BLZ	Panther
—	GK	(Belize) BLZ	Marvin Otley
—	DF	(Belize) BLZ	Findley Gladden

== List of coaches ==
- Pascual Noralez
