= List of Salvadoran football champions =

The Salvadoran Football Champion is the winner of the El Salvador National Football Championship (1926–1968) or the Liga Mayor (1969 to present) of football in El Salvador.

Currently, there are two champions each calendar year with one champion for the Apertura season and one for the Clausura season.

== Short Tournament (1926–1946) ==
Three regional champions, faced each other in the national championship. Each team represented a different section of the country (West zone, Central zone, East zone).

Season	Champion	Runner-up
1926	Chinameca	Nequepio
1927	Hércules	Chinameca
1928	Hércules	Excélsior F.C.
1929–30	Hércules	Excélsior F.C.
1930–31 (Note: No national championship held during this season, only regional championships. These championships are now often considered national titles.)	Hércules	
1931–32	Hércules	
1932–33	Hércules	
1933–34	Hércules	
1934–35	C.D. Maya	
1935–36	C.D. Maya	
1937	C.D. 33	C.D. Alacranes
1938	C.D. 33	C.D. Maya
1939	C.D. 33	
1940	España F.C.	
1941	Quequeisque	
1942	Quequeisque	Juventud Olímpica
1943	Quequeisque	Ferrocarril
1944	Quequeisque	
1945	Quequeisque	
1946	Libertad	Once Municipal

== League System (1947–1997) ==
Season	Champion	Runner-up
1947	Not held	
1948-49	Once Municipal	Libertad
1949–50	Not held	
1950–51	C.D. Dragón	C.D. FAS
1951–52	C.D. FAS	Leones
1952–53	C.D. Dragón	Juventud Olímpica
1953–54	C.D. FAS	C.D. Dragón
1955	Atlético Marte	C.D. Dragón
1955–56	Atlético Marte	L.A. Firpo
1956–57	Atlético Marte	Atlante
1957–58	C.D. FAS	Once Municipal
1959	C.D. Águila	C.D. FAS
1960–61	C.D. Águila	C.D. FAS
1961–62	C.D. FAS	C.D. Águila
1962	C.D. FAS	Atlante
1963–64	C.D. Águila	Juventud Olímpica
1964	C.D. Águila	C.D. FAS
1965–66	Alianza F.C.	Once Municipal
1966–67	Alianza F.C.	C.D. Águila
1967–68	C.D. Águila	C.D. FAS
1968–69	Atlético Marte	C.D. FAS
1970	Atlético Marte	C.D. FAS
1971	Juventud Olímpica	Alianza F.C.
1972	C.D. Águila	Juventud Olímpica
1973	Juventud Olímpica	Alianza F.C.
1974–75	C.D. Platense	Negocios Internacionales
1975–76	C.D. Águila	Alianza F.C.
1976–77	C.D. Águila	Once Municipal
1977–78	C.D. FAS	Once Municipal
1978–79	C.D. FAS	Alianza F.C.
1979–80	C.D Santiagueño	C.D. Águila
1980–81	Atlético Marte	C.D Santiagueño
1981	C.D. FAS	Independiente Nacional 1906
1982	Atlético Marte	Independiente Nacional 1906
1983	C.D. Águila	C.D. FAS
1984	C.D. FAS	C.D. Águila
1985	Atlético Marte	Alianza F.C.
1986–87	Alianza F.C.	C.D. Águila
1987–88	C.D. Águila	C.D. FAS
1988–89	L.A. Firpo	Cojutepeque F.C.
1989–90	Alianza F.C.	L.A. Firpo
1990–91	L.A. Firpo	C.D. Águila
1991–92	L.A. Firpo	Alianza F.C.
1992–93	L.A. Firpo	Alianza F.C.
1993–94	Alianza F.C.	C.D. FAS
1994–95	C.D. FAS	L.A. Firpo
1995–96	C.D. FAS	L.A. Firpo
1996–97	Alianza F.C.	L.A. Firpo
1997–98	L.A. Firpo	C.D. FAS

== Apertura/Clausura format (1999–present) ==
The winner of the shorter, Apertura tournament has been deemed the "Champion Cup" winner, and the league format Clausura tournament as "champions".

=== Clausura ===
Season	Clausura Champion	Clausura Runner-Up
1999	L.A. Firpo	C.D. FAS
2000	L.A. Firpo	ADET
2001	C.D. Águila	C.D. FAS
2002	C.D. FAS	Alianza F.C.
2003	San Salvador F.C.	L.A. Firpo
2004	Alianza F.C.	C.D. FAS
2005	C.D. FAS	L.A. Firpo
2006	C.D. Águila	C.D. FAS
2007	A.D. Isidro Metapán	L.A. Firpo
2008	L.A. Firpo	C.D. FAS
2009	A.D. Isidro Metapán	L.A. Firpo
2010	A.D. Isidro Metapán	C.D. Águila
2011	Alianza F.C.	C.D. FAS
2012	C.D. Águila	A.D. Isidro Metapán
2013	L.A. Firpo	C.D. FAS
2014	A.D. Isidro Metapán	C.D. Dragon
2015	Santa Tecla F.C.	A.D. Isidro Metapán
2015–16	C.D. Dragon	C.D. Águila
2016–17	Santa Tecla F.C.	Alianza F.C.
2017–18	Alianza F.C.	Santa Tecla F.C.
2018–19	C.D. Águila	Alianza F.C.
2019–20	Season Cancelled due to the COVID-19 pandemic (Note: Once Deportivo were originally given the championship after leading the competition after 11 rounds, but the title was later retracted.)	
2020–21	C.D. FAS	Alianza F.C.
2021–22	Alianza F.C.	C.D. Águila
2022–23	Season was cancelled due to the San Salvador crowd crush.	
2023–24	Alianza F.C.	C.D. Municipal Limeño
2024–25	Alianza F.C.	C.D. Municipal Limeño

=== Apertura ===
Season	Apertura Cup Champion	Apertura Runner-Up
1998	Alianza F.C.	L.A. Firpo
1999	C.D. Águila	C.D. Municipal Limeño
2000	C.D. Águila	C.D. Municipal Limeño
2001	Alianza F.C.	L.A. Firpo
2002	C.D. FAS	San Salvador F.C.
2003	C.D. FAS	C.D. Águila
2004	C.D. FAS	C.D. Atlético Balboa
2005	C.D. Vista Hermosa	A.D. Isidro Metapán
2006	Once Municipal	C.D. FAS
2007	L.A. Firpo	C.D. FAS
2008	A.D. Isidro Metapán	C.D. Chalatenango
2009	C.D. FAS	C.D. Águila
2010	A.D. Isidro Metapán	Alianza F.C.
2011	A.D. Isidro Metapán	Once Municipal
2012	A.D. Isidro Metapán	Alianza F.C.
2013	A.D. Isidro Metapán	C.D. FAS
2014	A.D. Isidro Metapán	C.D. Águila
2015	Alianza F.C.	C.D. FAS
2016–17	Santa Tecla F.C.	Alianza F.C.
2017–18	Alianza F.C.	Santa Tecla F.C.
2018–19	Santa Tecla F.C.	Alianza F.C.
2019–20	Alianza F.C.	C.D. FAS
2020–21	Alianza F.C.	C.D. Águila
2021–22	Alianza F.C.	C.D. Platense
2022–23	C.D. FAS	Jocoro F.C.
2023–24	C.D. Águila	Jocoro F.C.
2024–25	Once Deportivo	C.D. FAS
2025–26		

== Performance by club ==
Teams in bold are currently participating in La Liga Mayor.

Team	Champions	Runners-up	Winning Years
**FAS**	19	23	1951–52, 1953–54, 1957–58, 1961–62, 1962, 1977–78, 1978–79, 1981, 1984, 1994–95, 1995–96, Clausura 2002, Apertura 2002, Apertura 2003, Apertura 2004, Clausura 2005, Apertura 2009, Clausura 2021, Apertura 2022
**Alianza**	19	15	1965–66, 1966–67, 1986–87, 1989–90, 1993–94, 1996–97, Apertura 1998, Apertura 2001, Clausura 2004, Clausura 2011, Apertura 2015, Apertura 2017, Clausura 2018, Apertura 2019, Apertura 2020, Apertura 2021, Clausura 2022, Clausura 2024, 2025 Clausura
**Águila**	17	13	1959, 1960–61, 1963–64, 1964, 1967–68, 1972, 1975–76, 1976–77, 1983, 1987–88, Apertura 1999, Apertura 2000, Clausura 2001, Clausura 2006, Clausura 2012, Clausura 2019, Apertura 2023
**Luis Ángel Firpo**	10	11	1988–89, 1990–91, 1991–92, 1992–93, 1997–98, 1999 Clausura, 2000 Clausura, Apertura 2007, Clausura 2008, Clausura 2013
**Isidro Metapán**	10	3	Clausura 2007, Apertura 2008, Clausura 2009, Clausura 2010, Apertura 2010, Apertura 2011, Apertura 2012, Apertura 2013, Clausura 2014, Apertura 2014
Atlético Marte	8	–	1955, 1955–56, 1956–57, 1969, 1970, 1980–81, 1982, 1985
Hércules (Note: Defunct team)	7	–	1927, 1928, 1929–30, 1930–31, 1931–32, 1932–33, 1933–34
Quequeisque	5	–	1941, 1942, 1943, 1944, 1945
Santa Tecla	4	2	Clausura 2015, Apertura 2016, Clausura 2017, Apertura 2018
**Dragón**	3	3	1950–51, 1952–53, Clausura 2016
C.D. 33	3	–	1937, 1938, 1939
Once Municipal	2	6	1948–49, Apertura 2006
Juventud Olímpica	2	4	1971, 1973
Maya	2	1	1934–35, 1935–36
Santiagueño	1	1	1979–80
San Salvador	1	1	Clausura 2003
Chinameca S.C.	1	1	1926
Libertad	1	1	1946
**Platense**	1	1	1974–75
España	1	–	1940
Vista Hermosa	1	–	Apertura 2005
Once Deportivo	1	–	Apertura 2024
C.D. Municipal Limeño	0	3	-
Excélsior F.C.	0	2	-
Atlante	0	2	-
Independiente Nacional 1906	0	2	-
Nequepio	0	1	-
C.D. Alacranes	0	1	-
Ferrocarril	0	1	-
Leones	0	1	-
Universidad	0	1	-
Negocios Internacionales	0	1	-
Cojutepeque F.C.	0	1	-
ADET	0	1	-
C.D. Atlético Balboa	0	1	-
C.D. Chalatenango	0	1	-

== See also ==
- Primera División de Fútbol Profesional
