= List of former Primera División de Fútbol Profesional teams =

Clubs that have participated in the top flight Primera División that are not currently in the division.

== All-time list ==
Club	No.	First	Last	Best	Titles	Seasons	—	—
Acajutla F.C.-Tiburones		1986	1996	3rd Place (1988/89)	0	1986–1996	—	—
ADET		1983	2001	Runners up (Clausura 2000)	0	1983,1988–1989,1991–2001	—	—
ADLER		1965	1972	4th (1967/68)	0	1965-1972	—	—
Agave	1	1982	1982	TBD	0	1982	—	—
Alacranes		1937	1949	TBD	0	1937-1949	—	—
ANTEL		1975	1977	TBD	0	1975-1977	—	—
Apaneca		1992	1994	9th	0	1992-1994	—	—
Arcense		2002	2004	8th	0	2002-2004	—	—
Asturias Municipal		1955	1955	10th	0	1955	—	—
Atlante		1955	1970	Runner-up (2): 1956-1957, 1962	0	1955–1966, 1968–1970	—	—
Atlético Balboa		1999	2011	Runner up (Apertura 2004)	0	1999-2011	—	—
Club Deportivo 33		1933	1940	Champions	3 (1937. 1938, 1939)	1933-1940	—	—
Chinameca		1926	1927	Champion	1	1926	—	—
Cojutepeque		1987	1995	Runners up (1988–89)	0	1987-1995	—	—
Cuscatleco		1948	1949	TBD	0	1948-1949	—	—
El Roble		1994	1998	TBD	0	1994-1998	—	—
El Vencedor		2019	2020	TBD	0	2019-2020	—	—
España		1940	1941	Champions	1	1940-1941	—	—
Excélsior		1928	1973	TBD	0	1928–1930, 1971–1973	—	—
Ferrocarril		1938	1951	TBD	0	1938-1951	—	—
Fuerte Aguilares		1976	1977	TBD	0	1976-1977	—	—
Fuerte San Francisco		1990	1992	TBD	0	1990-1992	—	—
Gatos de Monterrey		1963	1964	TBD	0	1963-1964	—	—
H 13		1956	1957	TBD	0	1956-1957	—	—
Hércules		1927	1934	TBD	7	1927-1934	—	—
Independiente		1949	2020	TBD	0	1949-2007, 2019-2020	—	—
Juventud Olímpica		1939	1978	Champions	2 (1971, 1973)	1939–1952, 1955–1978	—	—
Juventud Olímpica Metalio		1999	2000	Champions	0	1999–2000	—	—
Leones		1951	1961	TBD	0	1951–1955, 1959–1961	—	—
Libertad		1946	1949	TBD	0	1946-1949	—	—
Soyapango F.C.	1	1986	1986	TBD	0	1986	—	—
Maya		1934	1939	Champions (1934/35 and 1935/36)	2	1934-1939	—	—
Nejapa FC-Alacranes Del Norte		2008	2010	TBD	0	2008-2010	—	—
Nequieo		1926	1926	TBD	0	1926	—	—
Once Lobos		1980	2005	TBD	0	1980–1987, 1996–1997, 2004–2005	—	—
Once Municipal		1948	2013	Champions (1948/49, 2006)	2	19-19	—	—
Platense		1974	1980	Champions (1975)	1	1974-1980	—	—
Quequeisque		1941	1965	TBD	0	1941-46, 1961–1965	—	—
Santa Anita		1941	1969	TBD	0	1941-1969	—	—
C. D. Santa Clara		1998	2001	TBD	0	1998-2001	—	—
San Luis	1	2001	2001	TBD	0	2001	—	—
San Salvador F.C.		2002	2008	Champions (2003)	1	2002-2008	—	—
Santiagueño		1978	1982	TBD	0	1978-1982	—	—
Telecomunicaciones		1961	1962	TBD	0	1961-1962	—	—
Tapachulteca		1975	1975	TBD	0	1975	—	—
UCA		1971	1986	TBD	0	1971–1972, 1984–1986	—	—
C.D. Vista Hermosa		2005	2012	Champions (Apertura 2005)	1	2005-2012	—	—

== Apertura and Clausura format ==
- ADET
- Arcense
- Atletico Balboa
- Atletico Marte
- Audaz
- El Vencedor
- El Roble
- Independiente
- Juventud Independiente
- Juventud Olímpica
- Nejapa FC-Alacranes Del Norte
- Once Deportivo
- Once Lobos
- Once Municipal
- Pasaquina
- C. D. Santa Clara
- San Luis
- San Salvador F.C.
- UES
- C.D. Vista Hermosa

== Clubs who have competed in the top flight First Division, but not in the current Apertura and Clausura ==
As of 28 March 2024

Club	Town or city	First Division titles	Total seasons	Last relegation	Current status (2019–20)	Level in pyramid	
Acajutla-Tiburones	TBD	0	10	1996	Defunct	N/A	
Adler	TBD	0	7	1972	Defunct	N/A	
Agave	TBD	0	1	1982	ADFA San Miguel	4	
Alacranes	TBD	0	12	1949	Defunct	N/A	
ANTEL	TBD	0	3	1977	Defunct	N/A	
Apaneca	TBD	0	3	1994	Defunct	N/A	
Asturias Municipal	TBD	0	1	1955	Defunct	N/A	
Atlante	San Alejo	0	13	1970	Defunct	N/A	
Audaz	Apastepeque	0	2	2019	Defunct	Tercera Division	3
Club Deportivo 33	TBD	3	7	1940	Defunct	N/A	
Chinameca	San Miguel	1	1	1927	Defunct	N/A	
Cojutepeque	Cojutepeque	0	8	1995	Defunct	N/A	
Cuscatleco	TBD	0	2	1949	Defunct	N/A	
España	TBD	1	2	1941	Defunct	N/A	
Excélsior	TBD	0	6	1973	Defunct	N/A	
Ferrocarril	Sonsonate	0	13	1951	Defunct	N/A	
Fuerte Aguilares	Aguilares, El Salvador	0	2	1977	Segunda Division	2	
Gatos de Monterrey	TBD	0	2	1964	Defunct	N/A	
H 13	TBD	0	2	1957	Defunct	N/A	
Leones	Sonsonate	0	8	1961	Defunct	N/A	
Libertad	La Libertad	0	4	1949	Defunct	N/A	
Marte Soyapango	Soyapango	0	1	1986	Defunct	N/A	
Maya	TBD	2	5	1939	Defunct	N/A	
Nequieo	TBD	0	1	1926	Defunct	N/A	
Quequeisque	Santa Tecla, El Salvador	7 ()	TBD	1965	Defunct	N/A	
Santa Anita	Santa Ana, El Salvador	0	TBD	1969	Defunct	N/A	
Santiagueño	Santiago de María	1 (1979)	5	1982	Defunct	N/A	
Tapachulteca	TBD	0	1	1975	Defunct	N/A	
Telecomunicaciones	TBD	0	1	1962	Defunct	N/A	
UCA	TBD	0	5 (1971–1972, 1984–1986)	1986	Defunct	N/A	
