= 1948–49 Primera División de El Salvador =

Salvadoran football league (1948–1949)

1948–49 Salvadoran Football Championship
- Season: 1948–49
- Dates: 1948 – 1949
- Champions: Once Municipal (1st title)
- Matches: 305
- Goals: 553 or 539 (1 per match)

The 1948–49 Salvadoran Football Championship was the 11th season of the first division of Salvadoran football. It was the first season with a league format and eliminating zone formats

C.D. Once Municipal was the season's champion, the club's first title.

== Team information ==
=== Personnel and sponsoring ===
Team	Chairman	Head coach	Captain	Kitmaker	Shirt sponsor
Alacranes	(El Salvador) TBD	(El Salvador) TBD	(El Salvador) TBD	TBD	TBD
Cuscatleco	(El Salvador) TBD	(El Salvador) TBD	(El Salvador) TBD	TBD	TBD
Dragon	(El Salvador) TBD	(El Salvador)	(El Salvador) TBD	TBD	TBD
Espana	(El Salvador) TBD	(El Salvador)	(El Salvador)	TBD	TBD
FAS	(El Salvador) TBD	(El Salvador) Armando Chacón	(El Salvador) TBD	TBD	TBD
Ferrocarril	(El Salvador) TBD	(El Salvador) TBD	(El Salvador) TBD	TBD	TBD
Independiente	(El Salvador) TBD	(El Salvador) TBD	(El Salvador) TBD	TBD	TBD
Juventud Olímpica	(El Salvador) TBD	(El Salvador) TBD	(El Salvador) TBD	TBD	TBD
Libertad F.C.	(El Salvador) TBD	(El Salvador) TBD	(El Salvador) TBD	TBD	TBD
LA Firpo	(El Salvador) TBD	(El Salvador) TBD	(El Salvador) TBD	TBD	TBD
Once Municipal	(El Salvador) TBD	(Argentina) Alberto Cevasco	(El Salvador) TBD	TBD	TBD
Quequeisque	(El Salvador) TBD	(El Salvador) TBD	(El Salvador) TBD	TBD	TBD
Santa Anita	(El Salvador) TBD	(El Salvador) TBD	(El Salvador) TBD	TBD	TBD

== League table ==
A total of 305 matches were held during the 1948–49 league season. Seven matches at the end of the season were not played as C.D. Once Municipal was already determined to be as the league's champion, leaving the remaining matches as unnecessary.

Pos	Team	Pld	W	D	L	GF	GA	GD	Pts
1	Once Municipal (C)	24	15	7	2	71	27	+44	37
2	Libertad F.C.	24	14	8	2	59	22	+37	36
3	FAS	23	13	3	7	59	47	+12	29
4	Juvetud Olimpica	24	11	4	9	42	44	−2	26
5	Dragon	22	10	5	7	37	31	+6	25
6	LA Firpo	22	9	7	6	43	41	+2	25
7	Santa Anita	21	10	4	7	38	28	+10	24
8	Alacranes	24	7	6	11	31	41	−10	20
9	Espana	21	8	4	9	36	43	−7	20
10	Independiente	23	6	7	10	31	41	−10	19
11	C.D. Ferrocarril	23	5	5	13	29	42	−13	15
12	Cuscatleco	22	5	3	14	34	56	−22	13
13	Quequeisque	23	2	3	18	23	76	−53	7

Source: RSSSF
(C) Champions
