= 1938 Salvadoran Football Championship =

Salvadoran football championship (1938)

Salvadoran Football Championship
- Season: 1938
- Dates: 6 November – 11 December 1938
- Champions: Club Deportivo 33 (2nd title)
- Matches: 4
- Goals: 21 (5.25 per match)

The 1938 Salvadoran Football Championship was the 6th season of the first division of Salvadoran football. Club Deportivo 33 was the season's champion, the club's second title.

== Participating clubs ==
Team	Method of qualification	Previous appearances
C.D. 33	Central Zone champions	1937
C.D. Maya	Central Zone runners-up	Debut
C.D. Ferrocarril	Western Zone champions	Debut
C.D. Internacional	Eastern Zone champions	Debut

== Tournament ==
=== Semifinals ===
6 November 1938

C.D. 33	4–1	C.D. Internacional

Estadio Nacional Flor Blanca, San Salvador, El Salvador

6 November 1938

C.D. Maya	3–1	C.D. Ferrocarril

Estadio Nacional Flor Blanca, San Salvador, El Salvador

=== Third-place match ===
11 December 1938

C.D. Internacional	3–2	C.D. Ferrocarril

Estadio Nacional Flor Blanca, San Salvador, El Salvador

=== Final ===
11 December 1938

C.D. 33	10–3	C.D. Maya

Estadio Nacional Flor Blanca, San Salvador, El Salvador

== Bracket ==
Semifinals
6 November – San Salvador
C.D. 33	4
C.D. Internacional	1
6 November – San Salvador
C.D. Maya	3
C.D. Ferrocarril	1

Final
11 December – San Salvador
C.D. 33	10
C.D. Maya	3
Third place match
11 December – San Salvador
C.D. Internacional	3
C.D. Ferrocarril	2
