= 1982 Primera División de Fútbol Profesional =

Primera División de Fútbol Profesional
- Season: 1982
- Champions: Atletico Marte (th Title)
- Relegated: C.D. Santiagueño

The 1982 Primera División de Fútbol Profesional season. At the end of the regular season, the top 4 teams took part in a Final series. ATletico were named Champions after defeating Independiente 3-0 on aggregate over a two leg series.

== Teams ==
| Team | City | Stadium | Head coach | Captain |
|---|---|---|---|---|
| Atletico Marte | San Salvador | Estadio Cuscatlan | (El Salvador) Armando Contreras Palma | (El Salvador) Manuel Ramos Y Ramos |
| Agave | Hacienda El Platanar, San Miguel | Estadio AGAVE | (El Salvador) Ovidio Mendez | (El Salvador) Rene Gonzalez Cacho |
| Aguila | TBD | Estadio Juan Francisco Barraza | (El Salvador) TBD | (El Salvador) Félix Pineda |
| Alianza | San Salvador | Estadio Cuscatlan | (El Salvador) Francisco Zamora | (El Salvador) |
| Chalatenango | Chalatenango | Estadio El Sombrero | (El Salvador) TBD | (El Salvador) |
| FAS | Santa Ana | Estadio Oscar Quiteño | (El Salvador) TBD | (El Salvador) David Cabrera |
| Firpo | TBD | Estadio de Usulutan | (El Salvador) TBD | (El Salvador) |
| Independiente | TBD | Estadio Jiboa | (El Salvador) TBD | (El Salvador) |
| Once Lobos | TBD | Estadio El Progreso | (El Salvador) Ricardo Mena Laguán | (El Salvador) |
| Santiagueño | TBD | Estadio Municipal | (El Salvador) TBD | (El Salvador) |
| UES | San Salvador | Estadio Universitario | (El Salvador) TBD | (El Salvador) |

== Managerial changes ==
=== During the season ===
| Team | Outgoing manager | Manner of departure | Date of vacancy | Replaced by | Date of appointment | Position in table |
|---|---|---|---|---|---|---|
| TBD | (El Salvador) TBD | Sacked | 1989 | (El Salvador) | 1990 | |
| TBD | (El Salvador) TBD | Sacked | 1989 | (El Salvador) | 1990 | |

== League standings ==
| Pos | Team | Pld | W | D | L | GF | GA | GD | Pts | Qualification or relegation |
|---|---|---|---|---|---|---|---|---|---|---|
| 1 | Independiente | 30 | 15 | 12 | 3 | 55 | 22 | +33 | 42 | Qualified to finals. |
| 2 | Atlético Marte | 30 | 14 | 10 | 6 | 38 | 26 | +12 | 38 | Qualified to finals. |
| 3 | Once Lobos | 30 | 12 | 12 | 6 | 39 | 30 | +9 | 36 | Qualified to finals. |
| 4 | C.D. Águila | 30 | 13 | 13 | 4 | 41 | 22 | +19 | 39 | Qualified to finals. |
| 5 | C.D. FAS | 30 | 12 | 8 | 10 | 43 | 37 | +6 | 32 | |
| 6 | Alianza F.C. | 20 | 10 | 7 | 3 | 30 | 36 | −6 | 27 | |
| 7 | UES | 30 | 8 | 8 | 14 | 30 | 43 | −13 | 24 | |
| 8 | Agave | 30 | 4 | 15 | 11 | 30 | 43 | −13 | 23 | |
| 9 | C.D. Chalatenango | 30 | 6 | 10 | 14 | 33 | 54 | −21 | 22 | |
| 10 | C.D. Luis Ángel Firpo | 30 | 7 | 12 | 11 | 38 | 42 | −4 | 26 | |
| 11 | C.D. Santiagueño | 30 | 6 | 9 | 15 | 28 | 50 | −22 | 21 | Relegated to Segunda Division. |

Source: https://www.rsssf.org/tablese/elsalhist.html

== Playoffs ==
=== Semifinals 1st leg ===
1982

| Atletico Marte | 2-0 | Once Lobos |
|---|---|---|
| TBD 20'; TBD 27' | | Nil |

1982

| Independiente F.C. | 4-0 | C.D. Aguila |
|---|---|---|
| TBD 23'; TBD 26'; TBD 85'; TBD 85' | | Nil |

=== Semifinals 2nd leg ===
1982

| Once Lobos | 1-1 | Atlético Marte |
|---|---|---|
| TBD 44' | | TBD 119' |

1982

| C.D. Aguila | 2-2 | Independiente F.C. |
|---|---|---|
| TBD 10'; TBD 70' | | TBD 10'; TBD 70' |

=== Final ===
December 19, 1982

| Atletico Marte | 1-0 | Independiente F.C. |
|---|---|---|
| Antonio Infantozzi | | Nil |

Estadio Cuscatlán

December 26, 1982

| Independiente F.C. | 0-2 | Atletico Marte |
|---|---|---|
| Nil | | Wilfredo Huezo; Antonio Infantozzi |

Estadio Cuscatlán

== Top scorers ==
| Pos | Player | Team | Goals |
|---|---|---|---|
| 1. | (El Salvador) Óscar Gustavo “Lotario” Guerrero | Independiente FC | 19 |
| 2 | (El Salvador) TBD | TBD | TBD |
| 3. | (El Salvador) TBD | TBD | TBD |
| 4. | (El Salvador) TBD | TBD | TBD |
| 5. | (El Salvador) TBD | TBD | TBD |
| 6. | (El Salvador) TBD | TBD | TBD |
| 7. | (El Salvador) TBD | TBD | TBD |
| 8. | (El Salvador) TBD | TBD | TBD |
| 9. | (El Salvador) TBD | TBD | TBD |
| 10. | (El Salvador) TBD | TBD | TBD |

== List of foreign players in the league ==
This is a list of foreign players in 1982 Seasons. The following players:

1. have played at least one apertura game for the respective club.
2. have not been capped for the El Salvador national football team on any level, independently from the birthplace

Atletico Marte

- None

Agave

- (Honduras) Miguel Angel Lanza Breve
- (Honduras) Daniel Sambula Diablo

C.D. Águila

- (Argentina) Alberto Centurión
- (Brazil) Ademir Barbosa
- (Brazil) Alan Marcos de Quiroz
- (Brazil) Antonio Pinho

Alianza F.C.

- (Argentina)

Chalatenango

- (Honduras)

FAS

- (Argentina) Manolo Alvarez
- (Brazil) Eraldo Correia

(player released mid season) (player Injured mid season) Injury replacement player

Independiente

- (Argentina)

Luis Ángel Firpo

- (Brazil) Marco Antonio Periera

Once Lobos

- (Guatemala) Byron Pérez
- (Guatemala) Óscar La “Coneja” Sánchez
- (Guatemala) Erwin Donis
- (Guatemala) Jorge La “Chana” Fernández

Santigueno

- (Honduras)

UES

- (Honduras) Harry Ramon Bran
