= Mágico González =

Salvadoran footballer (born 1958)

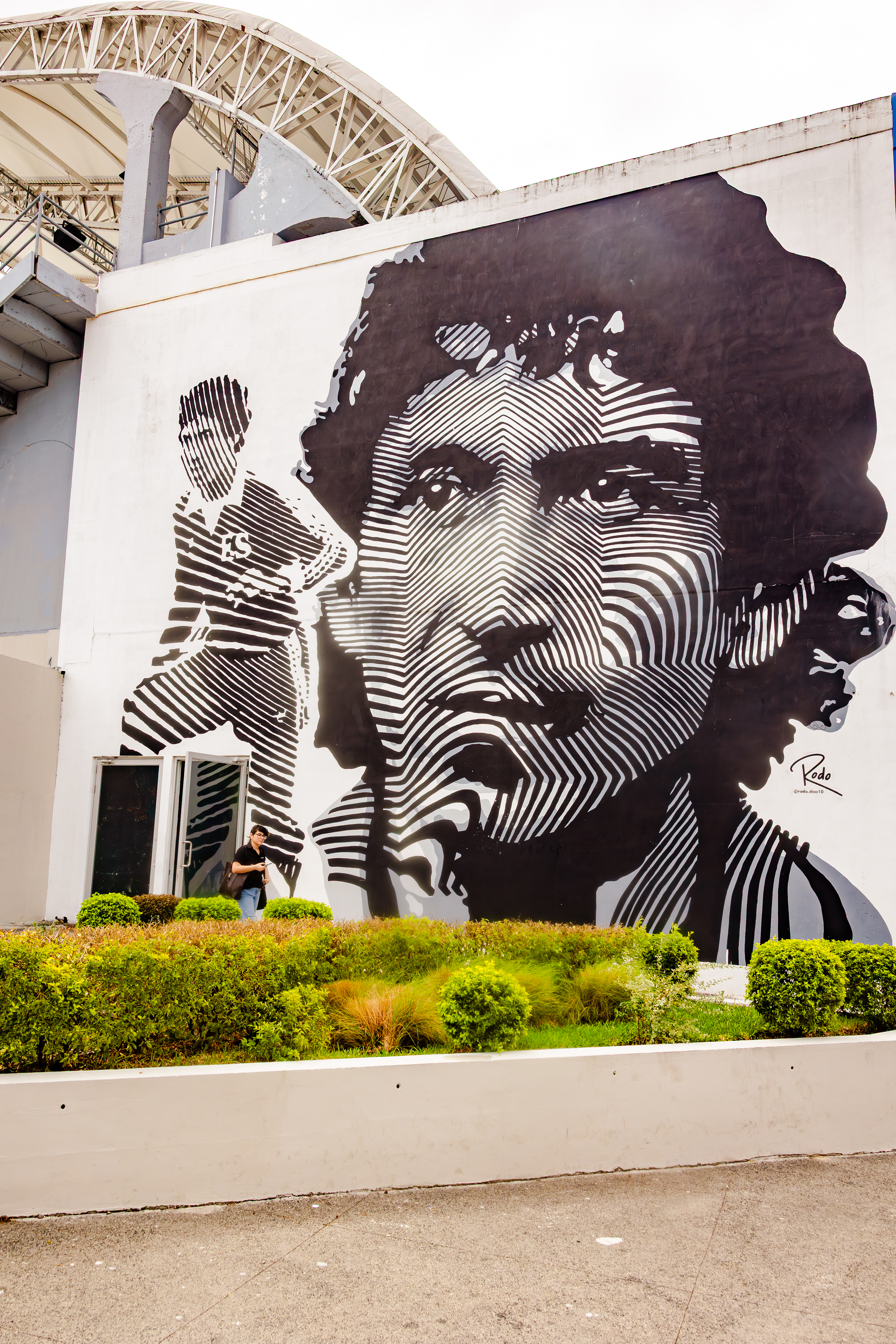
- González mural at the Estadio Jorge "El Mágico" González

Personal information
- Full name: Jorge Alberto González Barillas
- Date of birth: 13 March 1958 (age 68)
- Place of birth: San Salvador, El Salvador
- Height: 1.73 m (5 ft 8 in)
- Positions: Forward; attacking midfielder

Senior career*
Years	Team	Apps	(Gls)
1975–1976	ANTEL	45	(13)
1976–1977	Independiente	32	(7)
1977–1982	FAS	63	(39)
1982–1984	Cádiz	75	(29)
1985	Valladolid	9	(2)
1986–1991	Cádiz	119	(28)
1991–1999	FAS		
2002	San Salvador		
Total		343+	(118+)

International career
1976–1998	El Salvador	62	(21)

Managerial career
- 2000–2001: Houston Dynamo (assistant)
- 2001–2002: San Salvador (assistant)
- 2011: El Salvador (assistant)
Medal record
Men's football
Representing El Salvador
CONCACAF Championship
Runner-up	1981 Honduras
Third place	1977 Mexico
Central American Games
Gold medal – first place	1977 El Salvador
- * Club domestic league appearances and goals

Jorge Alberto González Barillas (born 13 March 1958), popularly known as El Mágico ("The Magical One" or "The Wizard"), is a Salvadoran former professional footballer who played mainly as a forward.

At the club level, he played mainly for FAS and Spain's Cádiz in a 24-year senior career. Dogged by his self-admitted and often-reported lack of discipline, he was often mentioned as one of the most skilled footballers ever produced by El Salvador, and as one of the greatest players from the CONCACAF region.

González represented the El Salvador national team for more than two decades, taking part in the 1982 World Cup and the 1998 Gold Cup.

== Club career ==
=== Early years ===
Born in San Salvador, González began his professional career in 1975, representing ANTEL and Independiente over two seasons before moving to FAS in the Primera División de El Salvador.

While playing in El Salvador, González became known as Mago but later, upon transferring to Spain, his nickname was slightly changed to Mágico; journalist Francisco "Paco" Perea (1946–2024), while working for the Diario de Cádiz newspaper, was the one who made this adjustment.

=== Cádiz ===
Both Atlético Madrid and Cádiz became interested in acquiring González in 1982 but, despite the Colchoneros' higher profile, he signed with the Andalusians. His first game in Spain came in a friendly against La Barca de la Florida, while his Segunda División debut was on 5 September 1982 in a 1–1 home draw against Real Murcia, scoring in the process. He became a fan favorite thanks to his dazzling moves and goals, but was also notorious for his love of the nightlife and his sleeping habits were also brought into question, whilst his on-field abilities endeared him to the Cádiz fans enough that they overlooked his minor indiscretions; he finished his first season with 33 games and 14 goals as the team promoted to La Liga.

In 1983 and 1984, Cádiz traveled to the United States. González was the principal attraction the first year, but in the following the side was joined by Barcelona and its superstar Diego Maradona, who later claimed that the Salvadoran was "without a doubt amongst the greatest ten players I have ever seen play in all my life. Better than myself and even better than Pelé". His debut in the top division came on 11 September 1983 in a 1–3 home loss against the same opponent, Murcia, and they were immediately relegated.

Despite this, Paris Saint-Germain of France showed interest in signing him, as well as Italian teams Atalanta, Fiorentina and Sampdoria, but González chose to stay in Cádiz. His stay was somewhat short-lived, however, as he was transferred to Real Valladolid in the 1985 January transfer window due to problems with manager Benito Joanet. He did not get along at Valladolid, where his personal life was tightly controlled and, after playing in just nine games, he returned to Cádiz exactly one year later; as a precaution against his partying, his contract was reputed to have contained a clause stipulating he was to be paid US$700 per game played and none for the ones he missed.

After several coaching changes, González was finally able to shine again for Cádiz under Víctor Espárrago, still competing in a further four top-tier campaigns. In all, he scored 58 goals in 194 league games for the club until his departure on 6 June 1991, aged 33.

=== Later career ===
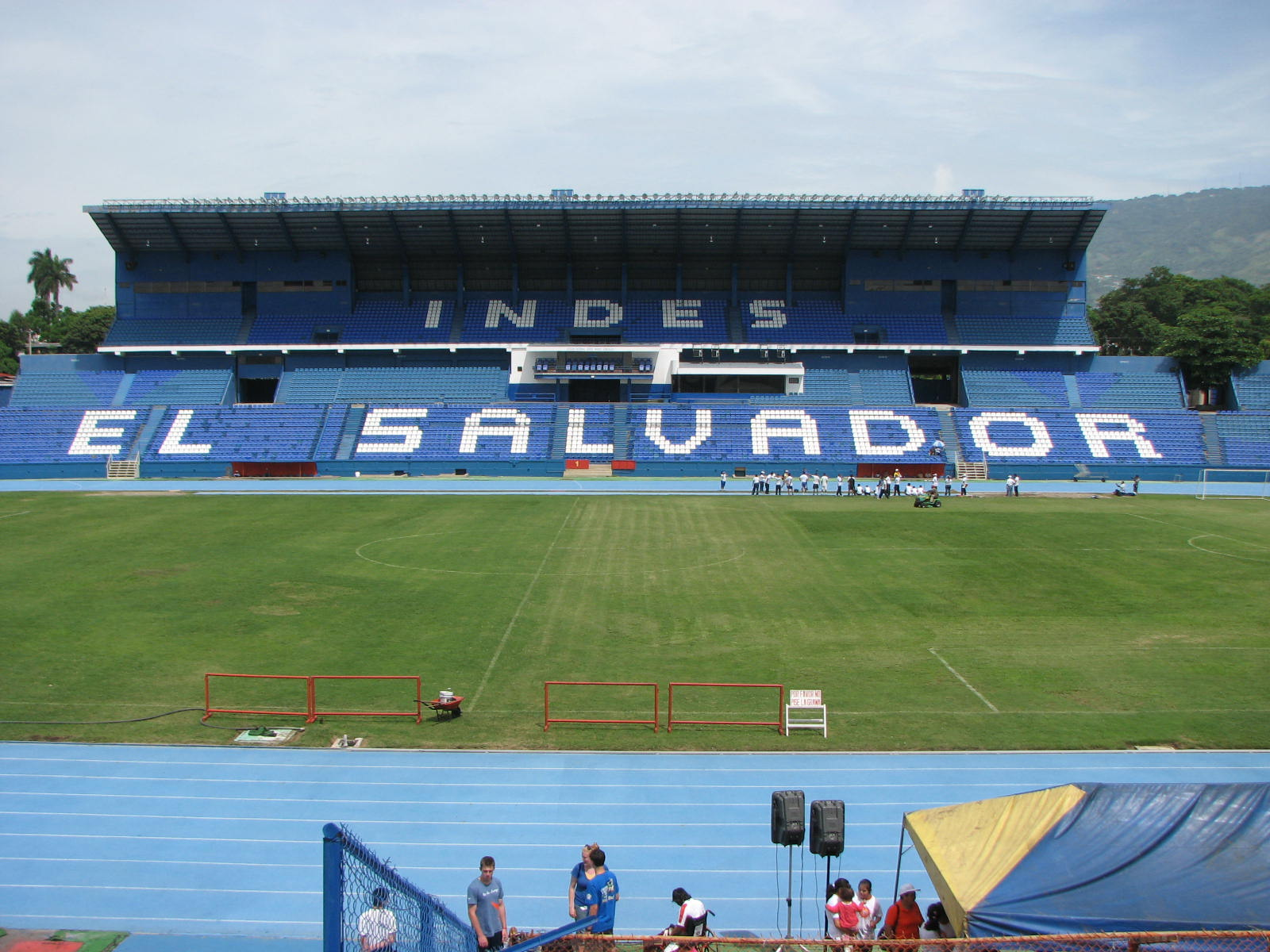
Estadio Jorge "El Mágico" González

González returned to El Salvador and FAS after Atalanta again failed to sign him. He stayed with the former until 1999 when he retired to begin coaching as an assistant in Houston, Texas. After a short stint in the US, he returned to his homeland.

In 2001, Cádiz honored González with a testimonial match, with the proceeds going to the victims of a recent earthquake in El Salvador. In 2003, the Salvadoran National Assembly gave González the government's highest honor, the Hijo Meritísimo, and renamed the national stadium the Flor Blanca after him. On 28 August 2004, another testimonial was played in his honor, this time in El Salvador at the Mágico González Stadium, between America XI, a group of international stars, and a team made up of ex-FAS players; he played a half with either side and scored a total of three goals.

== International career ==
Many critics and journalists say that if González had been Argentinian or Brazilian, he would have ranked amongst the best in the world, alongside Maradona and Pelé. He received the first of his 62 caps for El Salvador on 1 December 1976, in a FIFA World Cup qualification match against Costa Rica. He was also instrumental in leading the nation to the 1982 FIFA World Cup – the second time in history – where he appeared in all three group-stage matches, including the 10–1 loss to Hungary.

González represented his country in 31 World Cup qualifiers, and scored 21 goals in full internationals.

== Style of play and temperament ==
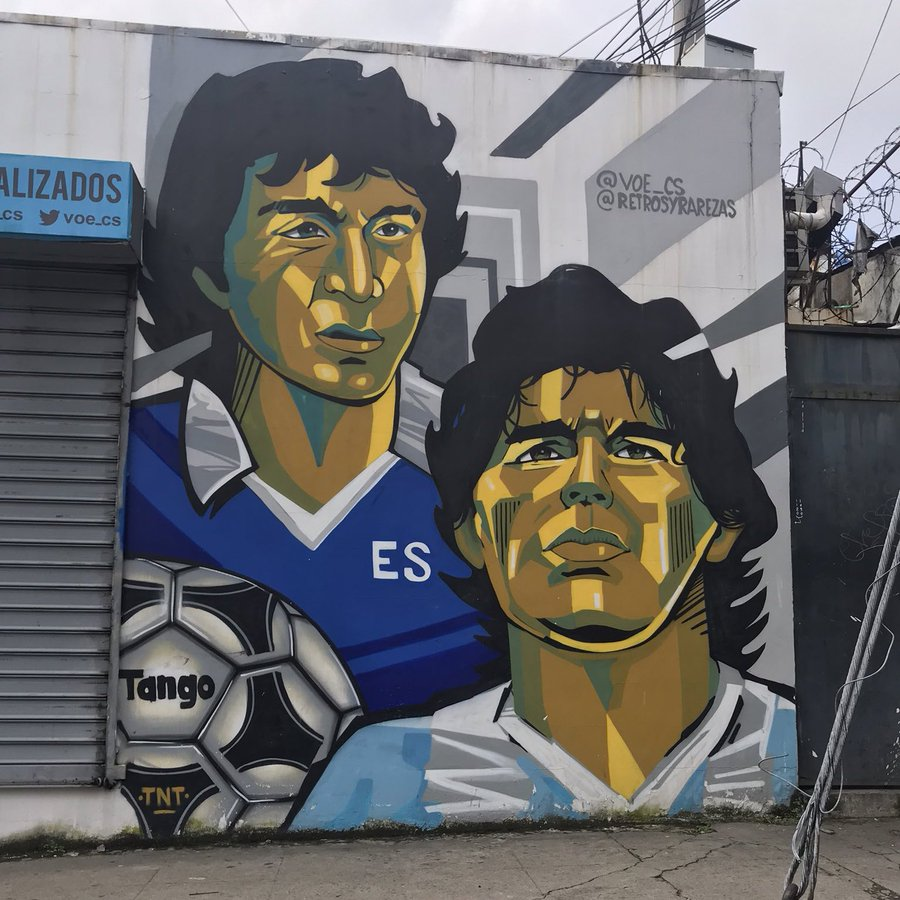
Mural of González and Diego Maradona

A slender and highly creative forward, with superb ball control, technical ability and dribbling skills, González was also known for his quick feet and use of tricks and feints (including the flip flap, the Cruyff turn and the step over), as well as his accuracy with the ball and speed in possession – however, his talent was often overshadowed by his questionable behaviour off the pitch. He was widely considered to be the greatest Salvadoran footballer of all time, as well as one of the best-ever Latin American footballers in the history of the game. In 1999, he was named his nation's Player of the Century in IFFHS' Player of the Century Elections.

A versatile forward, González was capable of playing both as a winger or as a second striker, but was also deployed as a centre-forward, as a playmaker in the number 10 role or even as a midfielder on occasion, and often wore the number 11 shirt. His playing style served as an inspiration for Maradona, who was a staunch admirer of the Salvadoran, describing him as one of the ten best players he had ever seen and even stating that "we, in training, always tried to imitate him [González], but couldn't."

== Personal life ==
González was born to a family of modest means in the Luz neighborhood of San Salvador, with seven brothers and one sister. His older brother, Mauricio, was a footballer who became well known at the local level.

Mágico married Ana María Ruano, daughter of another Salvadoran football legend, Alfredo Ruano. His son, Rodrigo (born 1981), played in the country's top division for Atlético Marte; he had several partners throughout his life, and fathered two children with a different woman in Spain and a daughter with another in the United States.

== Career statistics ==
Scores and results list El Salvador's goal tally first.

Goal	Date	Venue	Opponent	Result	Competition	Scored
1	29 April 1977	Estadio Azteca, Mexico City, Mexico	Mexico	1–2	Friendly	1
2	20 October 1977	Estadio Tecnológico, Monterrey, Mexico	Suriname	3–2	1977 CONCACAF Championship	1
3	4 June 1980	Flor Blanca, San Salvador, El Salvador	Haiti	3–0	Friendly	1
4	17 August 1980	Mateo Flores, Guatemala City, Guatemala	Guatemala	1–1	Friendly	1
5	24 August 1980	Rommel Fernández, Panama City, Panama	Panama	3–1	1981 CONCACAF Championship qualification	1
7	? September 1980	Cuscatlán, San Salvador, El Salvador	Guatemala	3–2	Friendly	2
10	5 October 1980	Cuscatlán, San Salvador, El Salvador	Panama	4–1	1981 CONCACAF Championship qualification	3
11	23 November 1980	Cuscatlán, San Salvador, El Salvador	Honduras	2–1	1981 CONCACAF Championship qualification	1
12	26 July 1981	Cuscatlán, San Salvador, El Salvador	Haiti	4–0	Friendly	1
14	18 April 1982	Cuscatlán, San Salvador, El Salvador	Honduras	3–2	Friendly	2
15	8 December 1991	Cuscatlán, San Salvador, El Salvador	Hungary	1–1	Friendly	1
17	19 July 1992	Managua, Nicaragua	Nicaragua	5–0	1994 World Cup qualification	2
18	23 July 1992	Cuscatlán, San Salvador, El Salvador	Nicaragua	5–1	1994 World Cup qualification	1
19	25 October 1992	Cuscatlán, San Salvador, El Salvador	Canada	1–1	1994 World Cup qualification	1
20	1 November 1992	Cuscatlán, San Salvador, El Salvador	Bermuda	4–1	1994 World Cup qualification	1
21	2 May 1993	Cuscatlán, San Salvador, El Salvador	Canada	1–2	1994 World Cup qualification	1

== Honours ==
FAS

- Primera División de El Salvador: 1977–78, 1978–79, 1981, 1994–95, 1995–96
- CONCACAF Champions Cup: 1979

El Salvador

- Central American Games: 1977
- CONCACAF Championship runner-up: 1981; third place: 1977

Individual

- FAS Retired Number 10
- Cádiz Hall of Fame: 2001
- Cádiz Decade Best XI: 1980s
- CONCACAF Team of the Century: 1998
- IFFHS Best Salvadoran Player of the 20th Century
- Best Salvadoran Footballer of All Time
- El Salvador Hall of Fame: 2004
- IFFHS All-Time El Salvador Dream Team
- FIFA International Football Hall of Fame: 2013
- FIFA World Cup Central America's All-Time XI
- FourFourTwo 11th All-Time Best North America Footballer
