= Luciano Sanhueza =

Argentine footballer

Personal information
- Full name: Luciano Ariel Sanhueza Rozas
- Date of birth: 16 November 1996 (age 29)
- Place of birth: Comodoro Rivadavia, Argentina
- Height: 1.87 m (6 ft 2 in)
- Position: Striker

Team information
- Current team: Independiente Chivilcoy

Youth career
- Deportivo Portugués
- –2013: Huracán de Comodoro
- 2013–2014: Talleres
- 2015: Quilmes

Senior career*
Years	Team	Apps	(Gls)
2013	Huracán de Comodoro	1	(0)
2015	Quilmes	0	(0)
2016	Huracán de Comodoro	7	(1)
2017	Olimpia Itá		
2017	3 de Noviembre		
2017	Berazategui		
2018	Independiente San Julián	–	(–)
2018	Boxing Club	6	(6)
2018	CSD Scout	11	(9)
2018	Caupolicán Cauquenes	22	(16)
2019	Deportes Concepción		
2019–2020	Independiente FC	16	(4)
2020	Deportes Colina	6	(0)
2021	Ciudad de Bolívar	6	(1)
2021–2022	Argentino de Mendoza	8	(3)
2022	Managua	15	(2)
2022	Walter Ferretti	20	(5)
2023	Petrolero		(5)
2023	Ciclón de Tarija		
2024	Sacachispas	2	(0)
2024	Deportivo FATIC	3	(0)
2025	Falcon		
2025	Atlético Alagoinhas	3	(0)
2025	CNSC Academia	3	(4)
2025	Universitario de Vinto	9	(2)
2026	San Juan	–	(–)
2026–	Independiente Chivilcoy	10	(1)
- * Club domestic league appearances and goals as of 30 September 2026

Luciano Ariel Sanhueza Rozas (born 16 November 1996) is an Argentine footballer who plays as a striker for Independiente Chivilcoy.

== Career ==
Born in Comodoro Rivadavia, Argentina, Sanhueza began his career with his hometown clubs, Deportivo Portugués and Huracán de Comodoro, making his debut at the age of sixteen with the second one. As a youth player, he after was with Talleres de Córdoba and Quilmes. Despite he was with the Quilmes first team, he just made appearances for the reserves.

In 2016, he returned to Huracán de Comodoro. The next season, he moved to Paraguay and played for both Olimpia Itá and 3 de Noviembre.

Back in Argentina, he played for Berazategui, Independiente San Julián and Boxing Club from Río Gallegos. At the same time he played for Boxing Club, he made eleven appearances and scored nine goals for Chilean club CSD Scout from Punta Arenas, a city near Río Gallegos.

After getting over contracture, he moved to Chile and signed with Caupolicán from Cauquenes, not holding a foreign place due to his dual Argentine-Chilean nationality. After scoring sixteen goals with Caupolicán, he switched to Deportes Concepción in 2019. After a stint with Salvadoran Primera División side Independiente FC, he returned to Chile in 2020 and signed with Deportes Colina.

In 2021–22, he played for Argentine clubs Ciudad de Bolívar and Argentino de Mendoza.

In 2022, he played for both Managua FC and Walter Ferretti in the Nicaraguan top division.

In 2023, he moved to Bolivia and signed with Petrolero, scoring five goals. In March of the same year, he switched to Ciclón de Tarija.

In 2024, Sanhueza returned to Argentina and joined Sacachispas. In the second half of the same year, he returned to Bolivia and joined Deportivo FATIC.

In January 2025, Sanhueza moved to Brazil and joined Falcon.

On 31 July 2025, Sanhueza signed with Universitario de Vinto in the Bolivian Primera División.

Back to Argentina, Sanhueza joined Independiente de Chivilcoy.

== Personal life ==
Sanhueza holds Chilean nationality by descent through his mother since he was two years old.
