= 1937 Salvadoran Football Championship =

Salvadoran football championship (1937)

- Season: 1937
- Dates: 1–15 August 1937
- Champions: Club Deportivo 33 (1st title)
- Matches: 4
- Goals: 21 (5.25 per match)

The 1937 Salvadoran Football Championship was the 5th season of the first division of Salvadoran football. Club Deportivo 33 was the season's champion, the club's first title.

== Participating clubs ==
Team	Method of qualification	Previous appearances
C.D. 33	Central Zone champions	Debut
C.D. Alacranes	Central Zone runners-up	Debut
C.D. Los 44	Western Zone champions	Debut
C.D. Santiagueño	Eastern Zone champions	Debut

== Tournament ==
=== Semifinals ===
1 August 1937

C.D. 33	4–1	C.D. Santiagueño

Estadio Nacional Flor Blanca, San Salvador, El Salvador

1 August 1937

C.D. Alacranes	4–2	C.D. Los 44

Estadio Nacional Flor Blanca, San Salvador, El Salvador

=== Third-place match ===
15 August 1937

C.D. Los 44	4–2	C.D. Santiagueño

Estadio Nacional Flor Blanca, San Salvador, El Salvador

=== Final ===
15 August 1937

C.D. 33	3–1	C.D. Alacranes

Estadio Nacional Flor Blanca, San Salvador, El Salvador

== Bracket ==
Semifinals
1 August – San Salvador
C.D. 33	4
C.D. Santiagueño	1
1 August – San Salvador
C.D. Alacranes	4
C.D. Los 44	2

Final
15 August – San Salvador
C.D. 33	3
C.D. Alacranes	1
Third place match
15 August – San Salvador
C.D. Los 44	4
C.D. Santiagueño	2
