= 1986–87 Primera División de El Salvador =

36th season of Primera División de El Salvador

Primera División de El Salvador
- Season: 1986–87
- Champions: Alianza F.C. (3rd Title)
- Relegated: UES, Soyapango, UCA

The 1986–87 Primera División de El Salvador was the 36th tournament of El Salvador's Primera División since its establishment of the National League system in 1948. The tournament was scheduled to end in December 1986. On October 10, a 5.7 Earthquake struck San Salvador. The league postponed many games and the final round finally ended in February 1987. At the end of the regular season, the top four teams took part in the final group stage. Alianza, the best team in the final group, won the championship match against a Águila, the best regular season team.

== Teams ==
Team	City	Stadium	Head coach	Captain
Acajutla	TBD	Estadio	(El Salvador) TBD	(El Salvador)
Atletico Marte	TBD	Estadio Cuscutlan	(El Salvador)	(El Salvador)
Aguila	TBD	Estadio	(El Salvador) TBD	(El Salvador)
Alianza	TBD	Estadio	(El Salvador) TBD	(El Salvador)
Chalatenango	TBD	Estadio	(El Salvador) TBD	(El Salvador)
FAS	TBD	Estadio	(El Salvador) TBD	(El Salvador) Jose Luis Rugamas
Firpo	TBD	Estadio	(El Salvador) TBD	(El Salvador) Arnolo Quintanilla
Marte Soyapango	TBD	Estadio	(El Salvador) TBD	(El Salvador)
Metapan	TBD	Estadio	(El Salvador) TBD	(El Salvador)
Once Lobos	TBD	Estadio	(El Salvador) TBD	(El Salvador)
UCA	TBD	Estadio	(El Salvador) TBD	(El Salvador)
UES	TBD	Estadio	(El Salvador) TBD	(Honduras) Mario Bonilla Pacharaca

== Managerial changes ==
=== During the season ===
Team	Outgoing manager	Manner of departure	Date of vacancy	Replaced by	Date of appointment	Position in table
TBD	(El Salvador) TBD	Sacked	1989	(El Salvador)	1990	
TBD	(El Salvador) TBD	Sacked	1989	(El Salvador)	1990	

== League standings ==
Pos	Team	Pld	W	D	L	GF	GA	GD	Pts	Qualification or relegation
1	C.D. Águila	33	16	13	4	48	17	+31	45	Qualified to finals. Won the right to play a Championship Game if they fail to win the final round.
2	Once Lobos	33	13	15	5	43	28	+15	41	Qualified to finals.
3	Atlético Marte	33	14	12	7	40	27	+13	40	Qualified to finals.
4	Alianza F.C.	33	13	12	8	38	27	+11	38	Qualified to finals.
5	C.D. Luis Ángel Firpo	33	13	12	8	33	24	+9	38	Qualified to finals.
6	C.D. FAS	33	10	13	10	36	28	+8	33	
7	C.D. Chalatenango	33	8	16	9	32	35	−3	32	
8	Metapán	33	9	12	12	33	35	−2	30	
9	Acajutla	33	9	11	13	25	32	−7	29	
10	UES	33	6	16	11	25	36	−11	28	Relegated to Segunda Division.
11	Marte Soyapango	33	7	11	15	33	53	−20	25	Relegated to Segunda Division.
12	UCA	33	3	11	19	21	65	−44	17	Relegated to Segunda Division.

== 4th Place Playoff ==
December 28, 1986

Alianza F.C.	1-0	C.D. Luis Ángel Firpo
Rodolfo Alfaro 83'

Estadio Flor Blanca, San Salvador

== Final round standings ==
Pos	Team	Pld	W	D	L	GF	GA	GD	Pts	Qualification
1	Alianza F.C.	6	5	0	1	13	8	+5	10	Qualified to championship game
2	Atlético Marte	6	3	1	2	9	8	+1	7	
3	C.D. Águila	6	3	0	3	9	8	+1	6	
4	Once Lobos	6	0	1	5	7	14	−7	1	

== Final ==
22 February 1987

C.D. Aguila	0 – 0	Alianza
None		None
Penalties
Ned Barbosa (penalty missed); Juan Carlos Carreño (penalty scored); Ramón Maradiaga (penalty missed); Salvador Coreas (penalty missed)	1 – 3	(penalty missed) Ruben Alonso; (penalty scored) Rodolfo Alfaro; (penalty scored) Hernán Sosa; (penalty missed) Juan Ramón Pacheco; (penalty scored) Carlos Reyes

Estadio Cuscatlán, San Salvador
Referee: Carlos Ortiz Cardoza

Águila:
GK	1	(El Salvador) Alcides Caballero
DF	2	(El Salvador) Mario Castillo (c)
DF	3	(El Salvador) Fredy Orellana
DF	4	(Chile) Juan Carlos Carreño
DF	25	(El Salvador) Carlos Coreas (red card)
MF	8	(Honduras) Ramón Maradiaga
MF	6	(Brazil) Eduardo Santana (red card)
MF	10	(El Salvador) Luis Ramírez Zapata
MF	12	(El Salvador) Dagoberto López Medrano
FW	9	(Brazil) Ned Barbosa
FW	11	(El Salvador) Salvador Coreas
Substitutes:
MF	21	(El Salvador) Julio Herrera x López Medrano
Manager:
(Chile) Hernán Carrasco Vivanco

Alianza:
GK	15	(El Salvador) Raúl Chamagua
DF	5	(El Salvador) Carlos Medrano
DF	6	(El Salvador) Óscar Rodríguez
DF	7	(El Salvador) Antonio García Prieto
DF	12	(El Salvador) Jorge Orantes (red card)
MF	11	(Uruguay) Hernán Sosa
MF	21	(El Salvador) Juan Ramón Pacheco
MF	22	(Uruguay) Carlos Reyes
FW	10	(El Salvador) Joaquín Canales
FW	16	(El Salvador) Julio Palacios Lozano (c)
FW	20	(Uruguay) Rubén Alonso
Substitutes:
DF	3	(Argentina) Óscar Biegler x García Prieto
FW	13	(El Salvador) Rodolfo Alfaro x Palacios Lozano
Manager:
(Chile) Ricardo Sepúlveda

== Top scorers ==
Pos	Player	Team	Goals
1.	(Uruguay) Ruben Alonso	Alianza F.C.	TBD
2	(El Salvador) TBD	TBD	TBD
3.	(El Salvador) TBD	TBD	TBD
4.	(El Salvador) TBD	TBD	TBD
5.	(El Salvador) TBD	TBD	TBD
6.	(El Salvador) TBD	TBD	TBD
7.	(El Salvador) TBD	TBD	TBD
8.	(El Salvador) TBD	TBD	TBD
9.	(El Salvador) TBD	TBD	TBD
10.	(Uruguay) Jose Mario Figueroa	Atletico Marte	9

== List of foreign players in the league ==
This is a list of foreign players in 1986-1987. The following players:

1. have played at least one game for the respective club.
2. have not been capped for the El Salvador national football team on any level, independently from the birthplace

Acajutla

- (Peru)

C.D. Águila

- (Brazil) Ned Barbosa
- (Brazil) Eduardo Santana
- (Chile) Juan Carlos Carreño
- (Honduras) Ramón Maradiaga
- (Mexico) Nahún Corro

Alianza F.C.

- (Argentina) Óscar Biegler
- (Uruguay) Ruben Alonso
- (Uruguay) Carlos Reyes
- (Uruguay) Hernán Sosa

Atletico Marte

- (Honduras)

Chalatenango

- (Argentina) Arnaldo Martínez
- (Brazil) Marco Pereira

C.D. FAS

- (Guatemala) Miguel Angel Perez
- (Uruguay) Ademar Benitez
- (Argentina) Mariano Dalla Libera
- (Argentina) Zizinho
- (Argentina) Salvador Azerrad

(player released mid season) (player Injured mid season) Injury replacement player

C.D. Luis Ángel Firpo

- (Brazil) Joao Cabral Filho
- (Brazil) Salvador Filho
- (Brazil) Luisinho Ferreira
- (Brazil) Jorge Nunez

CESSA Metapan

- (Honduras) Tony Laing
- (Honduras) Richardson Smith
- (Honduras) Raul Centeno Gamboa
- (Honduras) Palic Castillo

Soyapango FC

- (Honduras)

Once lobos

- (Guatemala) Byron perez
- (Guatemala) Jorge "La Chana" Fernández

UCA

- (Honduras)

UES

- (Honduras) Mario Bonilla
