= 1981 Primera División de Fútbol Profesional =

Primera División de Fútbol Profesional
- Season: 1981
- Champions: C.D. FAS (8th Title)
- Relegated: None

The 1981 Primera División de Fútbol Profesional season also known as the Copa Casino. At the end of the regular season, the top 4 teams took part in a Final series. FAS were named Champions after defeating Independiente 4–3 on penalties, after 1–1 draw.

== Teams ==
Team	City	Stadium	Head coach	Captain
Atletico Marte	TBD	Estadio Cuscutlan	(El Salvador) Armando Contreras Palma	(El Salvador) Fredy Rivera
Aguila	TBD	Estadio	(El Salvador) TBD	(El Salvador) Salvador Coreas
Alianza	TBD	Estadio	(El Salvador) TBD	(El Salvador) Abilio Martinez
Chalatenango	TBD	Estadio	(El Salvador) TBD	(El Salvador)
FAS	TBD	Estadio	(El Salvador) Ricardo Mena Laguán	(El Salvador) David Cabrera
Firpo	TBD	Estadio	(El Salvador) TBD	(El Salvador)
Independiente	TBD	Estadio	(El Salvador) TBD	(El Salvador) Roberto Gonzalez Vega
Once Lobos	TBD	Estadio	(El Salvador) TBD	(El Salvador)
Santiagueño	TBD	Estadio	(Chile) Julio Escobar del Carmen	(El Salvador)
UES	TBD	Estadio	(El Salvador) TBD	(El Salvador)

== Managerial changes ==
=== During the season ===
Team	Outgoing manager	Manner of departure	Date of vacancy	Replaced by	Date of appointment	Position in table
FAS	(El Salvador) Ricardo Mena Laguan	Resigned	August 1981	(El Salvador) Rubén Vásquez (Interim)	August 1981	
FAS	(El Salvador) Rubén Vásquez	Interimship ended, moved back as assistant coach	September 1981	(El Salvador) Juan Francisco Barraza	September 1981	
Aguila	(El Salvador) TBD	Sacked	1981	(El Salvador) Saúl Molina	1981	

== League standings ==
Pos	Team	Pld	W	D	L	GF	GA	GD	Pts	Qualification or relegation
1	C.D. FAS	26	17	5	4	36	13	+23	39	Qualified to finals.
2	Independiente	26	14	7	5	35	22	+13	35	Qualified to finals.
3	Atlético Marte	26	10	10	6	42	34	+8	30	Qualified to finals.
4	UES	26	10	9	7	41	31	+10	29	Qualified to finals.
5	C.D. Chalatenango	26	8	11	7	33	36	−3	27	
6	Alianza F.C.	26	7	11	8	24	27	−3	25	
7	C.D. Santiagueño	26	6	9	11	24	32	−8	21	
8	Once Lobos	26	5	10	11	25	40	−15	20	
9	C.D. Águila	26	6	5	15	34	41	−7	17	
10	C.D. Luis Ángel Firpo	26	6	5	15	26	44	−18	17	

Source: https://www.rsssf.org/tablese/elsalhist.html

== Playoffs ==
=== Semifinals 1st leg ===
1981

Atletico Marte	5-1	FAS
TBD 20' 20'; TBD 27'; TBD 20'; TBD 27'		TBD 20'

1981

Independiente	2-0	UES
TBD 23'; TBD 26'		Nil

=== Semifinals 2nd leg ===
1981

FAS	3-2	Atlético Marte
TBD 44'; TBD 70'; TBD 70'		TBD 119'; TBD 70'

1981

UES	2-1	Independiente
TBD 10'; TBD 70'		TBD 10'

=== Final ===
October 31, 1981

C.D. FAS	1-1	Independiente
David Cabrera 81'		Jesus González
Penalties
David Cabrera (penalty scored); Aldo Valenzuela (penalty scored); Atilio Estrada (penalty missed); Carlos Humberto Vargas (penalty scored); Manolo Álvarez (penalty scored)	4 – 3	(penalty scored) Efrain Ji.González; (penalty scored) Quino Valencia; (penalty missed) González Vega; (penalty scored) Henry Moreno; (penalty missed) Jesús González

Estadio Cuscatlán, San Salvador

== Top scorers ==
Pos	Player	Team	Goals
1.	(El Salvador) David Arnoldo Cabrera	C.D. FAS	20
2	(El Salvador) TBD	TBD	TBD
3.	(El Salvador) TBD	TBD	TBD
4.	(El Salvador) TBD	TBD	TBD
5.	(El Salvador) TBD	TBD	TBD
6.	(El Salvador) TBD	TBD	TBD
7.	(El Salvador) TBD	TBD	TBD
8.	(El Salvador) TBD	TBD	TBD
9.	(El Salvador) TBD	TBD	TBD
10.	(El Salvador) TBD	TBD	TBD

== List of foreign players in the league ==
This is a list of foreign players in 1981 Seasons. The following players:

1. have played at least one apertura game for the respective club.
2. have not been capped for the El Salvador national football team on any level, independently from the birthplace

Atletico Marte

- None

C.D. Águila

- (Brazil)

Alianza F.C.

- (Argentina)

Chalatenango

- (Honduras)

FAS

- (Argentina) Manolo Alvarez

(player released mid season) (player Injured mid season) Injury replacement player

Independiente

- (Brazil) Alan Marcos de Queiroz Marquinho
- (Brazil) Justino da Silva

Luis Ángel Firpo

- (Brazil)

Once Lobos

- (Guatemala) Ricardo Luis Carreno
- (Guatemala) Peter Sandoval Mersing

Santigueno

- (Honduras)

UES

- (Honduras) Harry Ramon Bran
