= ANTEL (El Salvador football club) =

ANTEL, Antel-Telecom, Telecom FC
- Full name: Club Deportivo Administración Nacional de Telecomunicaciones
- Nickname: Los Inalámbricos
- Dissolved: 2007

Administración Nacional de Telecomunicaciones, also known as ANTEL, was a Salvadoran professional football club perhaps best known for being the first club where the famous El Salvadoran Mágico González played.

== History ==
The team played in the Primera División de Fútbol de El Salvador for two seasons from 1975 to 1977. After finishing in mid-table after the 1977 season, ANTEL decided to selling their place in the first division to Independiente de San Vicente, effectively ending the club's history as a professional entity.

They then slowly went into decline and were renamed ANTEL-Telecom then again renamed Telecom FC. The club ceased to exist after the 2006/2007 season, after their main sponsor and company they were named after pulled all support due to financial pressure leaving Telecom FC to be dissolved.

== Notable players ==
- (El Salvador) Mágico González (1975)
- (El Salvador) Norberto Huezo (1975)
- (El Salvador) Miguel "Michel" Cornejo (1975)
- (El Salvador) Herbert Machón (1975–1977)
- (El Salvador) Quino Valencia
- (El Salvador) Henry Moreno
- (El Salvador) Antonio Orellana Rico
- (El Salvador) Miguel "Mica" González (1972–1975)

=== Team captains ===
Name	Years
(El Salvador) Miguel "Mica" González	1975
Hiatus	TBD

== Former coaches ==
El Salvador

- (El Salvador) Ricardo Tomasino (1976)

Brazil

- (Brazil) Jorge Tupinambá dos Santos (January 1975 – July 1975)
