= 1995–96 Primera División de El Salvador =

Primera División de El Salvador
- Season: 1995–96
- Champions: FAS (11th Title)
- Relegated: Tiburones

The 1995–96 Primera División de El Salvador is the 45th tournament of El Salvador's Primera División since its establishment of the National League system in 1948. The tournament began on 3 September 1995 and it was scheduled to end on May 26, 1996. FAS won the replay championship match against LA Firpo 1–0. After the first game was tied 1-1.

== Teams ==
Team	City	Stadium	Head coach	Captain
Aguila	TBD	Estadio de San Miguel	(El Salvador) Oscar Emigdio Benitez	(El Salvador)
Alianza	TBD	Estadio	(Chile) Hernan Carrasco	(El Salvador)
Atletico Marte	TBD	Estadio Cuscutlan	(Brazil) Helio Rodriguez	(El Salvador) Carlos Castro Borja
Baygon-ADET	TBD	Estadio	(El Salvador) Armando Contreras Palma	(El Salvador)
Dragon	TBD	Estadio de San Miguel	(El Salvador) Jose Mario Martinez	(El Salvador)
El Roble	TBD	Estadio de Ilobasco	(El Salvador) Conrado Miranda	(Uruguay) TBD
FAS	TBD	Estadio	(Uruguay) Saul Lorenzo Rivero	(El Salvador) William Osorio
Firpo	TBD	Estadio de Usulutan	(Chile) Julio Escobar	(El Salvador)
C.D. Municipal Limeno	TBD	Estadio	(El Salvador) Victor Manuel Pacheco	(El Salvador)
Tiburones	TBD	Estadio Ana Mercedes	(El Salvador) Jorge Patrick	(El Salvador) William Santillana

== Managerial changes ==
=== Before the season ===
Team	Outgoing manager	Manner of departure	Date of vacancy	Replaced by	Date of appointment	Position in table
TBD	(El Salvador) Conrado Miranda	Sacked	September 1995	(El Salvador) Luis Angel Leon	1995	September 1995
Municipal Limeno	(El Salvador) TBD	Sacked	September 1995	(El Salvador) Saúl Molina	September 1995	

=== During the season ===
Team	Outgoing manager	Manner of departure	Date of vacancy	Replaced by	Date of appointment	Position in table
Firpo	(Chile) Julio Escobar]	Resigned	1995	(El Salvador) Victor Manuel Pacheco	1995	
Atletico Marte	(Brazil) Helio Rodriguez	Resigned	October 1995	(Uruguay) Juan Lopez	October 1995	9th
Tiburones	(El Salvador) Jorge Patris	Resigned	October 1995	(El Salvador) Raimundo Amaya Revelo	October 1995	
Tiburones	(El Salvador) Victor Manuel Pacheco	Resigned	October 1995	(El Salvador) Carlos Melendez	October 1995	
Atletico Marte	(Uruguay) Juan Lopez	Interimship finished	October 1995	(Italy) Rene Renucci	October 1995	th
Dragon	(El Salvador) Mario Martinez	Sacked	1995	(Costa Rica) Didier Castro	1995	
Alianza	(Chile) Hernán Carrasco	Sacked	1995	(Uruguay) Jorge Aude	November 1995	
Aguila	(El Salvador) Oscar Emigdio Benitez	Resigned	December 1995	(Federal Republic of Yugoslavia) Milovan Đorić	January 1996	
Municipal Limeno	(El Salvador) Saúl Molina	Sacked	December 1995	(El Salvador) Abraham Vasquez (El Penero)	January 1996	
Municipal Limeno	(El Salvador) Abraham Vasquez (El Penero)	Resigned	January 1996	(Argentina) Juan Quarterone	February 1996	
Municipal Limeno	(Argentina) Juan Quarterone	Resigned	March 1996	(El Salvador) Victor Coreas (Player/coach)	April 1996	
Municipal Limeno	(El Salvador) Victor Coreas (Player/coach)	Interimship finished	April 1996	(El Salvador) Alfredo Ruano	April 1996	

=== Semifinals ===
==== First legs ====
30 April 1996
15:30 (UTC-6)

LA Firpo	1-1	Aguila
Luis Oseguera		Juan Castro

Estadio

30 April 1996
15:30 (UTC-6)

Municipal Limeno	0-0	FAS
Nil		Nil

Estadio Sergio Torres

==== Second legs ====
5 July 1996
15:00 (UTC-6)

FAS	3-2	Municipal Limeno
TBD 67'; Jorge Moccecci; Allan Oviedo		TBD 59'; TBD 76'

Estadio

FAS won 3-2 on aggregate

6 July 1996
15:00 (UTC-6)

Aguila	1-2	LA Firpo
Agustin Castillo 22'		William Renderos Iraheta 43'; Luis Oseguera 75'

Estadio
Attendance: 10,575

Firpo won 3-2 on aggregate

== Final ==
May 19, 1996

Firpo	1-1	FAS
Luis Oseguera 88'	[ ]	Floyd Guthrie 79' (o.g.)

Estadio Cuscatlán, San Salvador
May 26, 1996

FAS	1-0	Firpo
Agustin Gámez 67' (o.g.)	[ ]	Nil

Estadio Cuscatlán, San Salvador

FAS:
GK	-	(El Salvador) Adolfo Menéndez
DF	-	(El Salvador) Mario Mayén Meza
DF	-	(Uruguay) Jorge Moncecci
DF	-	(El Salvador) Carlos Sanchez
DF	-	(El Salvador) William Osorio
MF	-	(El Salvador) Erber Burgos
MF	-	(El Salvador) Jorge Rodriguez
MF	-	(El Salvador) Guillermo Rivera
MF	-	(El Salvador) Mágico González	Substituted on
FW	-	(Costa Rica) Allan Oviedo
FW	-	(United States) David Quesada
Substitutes:
MF		(United States) Hugo Perez		Substituted on
Manager:
(Uruguay) Saul Rivera

LA Firpo
GK	-	(El Salvador) Misael Alfaro
DF	-	(El Salvador) Giovanni Trigueros
DF	-	(El Salvador) Leonel Cárcamo
DF	-	(Brazil) Mauricio dos Santos
DF	-	(El Salvador) Juan Garcia Gamez
MF	-	(El Salvador) Marlon Menjivar
MF	-	(El Salvador) Fernando Lazo
MF	-	(Costa Rica) Floyd Guthrie
FW	-	(Chile) Raul Toro
FW	-	(El Salvador) William Renderos
FW	-	(Honduras) Luis Oseguera
Substitutes:
MF		(El Salvador) TBD	Substituted on
Manager:
(North Macedonia) Kiril Dojčinovski

== Top scorers ==
Pos	Player	Team	Goals
1.	(El Salvador) Raul Diaz Arce	LA Firpo	25
2	(Uruguay) Carlos Villareal	Dragon	20
3.	(El Salvador) Douglas Videl	ADET	15
4.	(Honduras) Jorge Martinez	Municipal Limeno	14
5.	(Uruguay) Raul Falero	Atletico Marte	14
6.	(Uruguay) Diego Aguirre	FAS	13
7.	(Sierra Leone) Abdul Conteh	Atletico Marte	13
8.	(El Salvador) Rene Martinez	Dragon	12
9.	(El Salvador) Milton Melendez	Alianza F.C.	12
10.	(Honduras) Victor Zuninga	Aguila	11
11.	(Uruguay) Alejandro Larrea	Atletico Marte	10
12.	(Uruguay) Ruben Alonso	Tiburones	9

== List of foreign players in the league ==
This is a list of foreign players in 1995-1996. The following players:

1. have played at least one game for the respective club.
2. have not been capped for the El Salvador national football team on any level, independently from the birthplace

C.D. Águila

- (Argentina) Luis Mariano Villegas
- (Brazil) Octavio Santana
- (Honduras) José Luis Piota
- (Honduras) Victor Zuniga
- (Grenada) Keith Fletcher
- (Peru) Agustin Castillo

Alianza F.C.

- (Chile) Martin Jiminez
- (Uruguay) Alejandro Curbelo
- (Nigeria) Charles Unaka
- (Uruguay) Hernan Fernando Sosa

Atletico Marte

- (Brazil) Gerson Enoc Voss
- (Sierra Leone) Abdul Conteh
- (Uruguay) Alejandro Larrea
- (Uruguay) Raúl Falero
- (Uruguay) Washington de la Cruz

Baygon-ADET

- (Brazil) Fernando de Souza

Dragon

- (Costa Rica) Miguel Segura
- (Honduras) Luis Areola
- (Honduras) Carlos Ruiz
- (Uruguay) Carlos Villareal

(player released mid season) (player Injured mid season) Injury replacement player

El Roble

- (Honduras) German Perez
- (Honduras) Jorge Olgades
- (Uruguay) William Couto Gutierrez
- (Uruguay) Fernando Olivera

C.D. FAS

- (Argentina) Ariel Borldrini
- (Costa Rica) Allan Oviedo
- (Guatemala) Julio Rodas
- (Uruguay) Carlos Sanchez
- (Uruguay) Diego Aguirre
- (Uruguay) Jorge Moccecci
- (United States) David Quezada

C.D. Luis Ángel Firpo

- (Brazil) Mauricio Do Santos
- (Chile) Raul Toro
- (Costa Rica) Floyd Guthrie
- (Honduras) Luis Enrique Oseguera
- (Honduras) Lester Clay Marson

Limeno

- (Costa Rica) Cristian Vactory
- (Honduras) German Rodriguez
- (Honduras) Jorge Martinez
- (Honduras) Rainiero Medina
- (Honduras) Ivan Nolasco

Tiburones

- (Chile) Juan Marrquez
- (Costa Rica) Carl Davis
- (Honduras) Javier Flores
- (Uruguay) Ruben Alonso
