= History of Sonsonate FC =

The history of Sonsonate FC, a professional soccer team based in Sonsonate, El Salvador, spans over six decades. The first team based in Sonsonate was Ferrocarril club of the now-defunct league, playing from 1943 to 1950. After seven years, a new team was formed with some of the Ferrocarril players to form a new team, the first team to use the "Sonsonate" name. This team conituned until 1951. After 1951, Ferrocarril and Sonsonate joined forces to form a new team; Leones. Leones continued to play as a club (playing in the primera division and segunda division) until 1966. This team bought back the Sonsonate name in 1966 and operated continuously in various leagues until 2002. The club became defunct and a team was set in 2008 called Alba-Acajutla, they played one season in segunda division before mounting debt caused them to become defunct. A Sonsonate FC team began again in 2009 and starting in 2015 began playing in the primera division making it the first time since 1999 that a "Sonsonate" team played in the top tier of soccer in El Salvador.

== F.C. Sonsonate ==
Founded in 1948, the club was known as CD Sonsonate, playing in the town of Sonsonate, and that is the name used most often. Despite several name changes the club always follows the lineage of titles and history back to the Sonsonate name. The club won promotion to the primera division in 1998, however one season later they were relegated The club currently competes in the Terecea Division since the 2012 season.

== Ferrocarril ==
The team competed for many years in the Salvadoran Sports Commission national week football tournament. In 1943, Ferrocarril won the Occidental Zone of El Salvador, and played in the final round with Central Zone winners Quequeisque and Oriental Zone winners Luis Ángel Firpo. They finished second in the group, runners-up to Quequeisque. Ferrocarril did not return to the first division of El Salvador after failing to enter the 1951–52 league. They later renamed themselves as Leones.

== Leones ==
The Leones arrived in the national league in the 1951–52 season, simply since the Salvadoran Football Federation had no institutionalised relegation rules. In their first year, the Leones finished runners-up to FAS. After five years in the league, they were relegated to the second division in the 1955–56 season. They returned to the first division in 1958, not before being relegated again in the 1960–61 season. The Leones failed to be promoted for a third time. They were renamed CD Sonsonate in 1967.

== Alba-Acajutla ==
Founded in 2008, the club was known as CD Alba-Acajutla, also playing in the town of Sonsonate. However, after poor attendance and financial struggle, the team sold their spot in the second division and reverted to their original form.

== F.C. Sonsonate rebirth and modern history (2009–Current) ==
On 9 September 2009, Cesar Antonio Contreras and Miguel Antonio Castillo along with Pedro Antonio Contreras and with the support of the Sonsonate department (in particular the head of the department José Roberto Aquino) were able to re-activate Sonsonate from defunct status and begin their time in the modern era.

The club competed in the Tercera Division for a few years, before winning promotion to the Segunda Division in 2011 under the direction of Ricardo Andrés Navarro.

Despite strong club following and several finals appearances the club failed to win the Apertura and Clausura title to achieve promotion in the Primera Division.

However, on the 12 July 2015, the club purchased the spot of recently promoted Real Destroyer meaning the club will participate in the Primera division for the first time in fifteen years (last time was 1999).

== Managers ==
Sonsonate (1948-1955)

Name	Nationality	Years	Ref.
TBD	SLV	TBD	

Ferrocarril (1943-1951)

Name	Nationality	Years	Ref.
TBD	SLV	TBD	

Leones (1951-1967)

Name	Nationality	Years	Ref.
TBD	SLV	TBD	

Sonsonate (1967-2003)

Name	Nationality	Years	Ref.
Rigoberto Guzmán	SLV	TBD	
Alfredo Ruano	SLV	TBD	
Mario "Tiorra" Castro	SLV	TBD	
Marcelo Estrada	SLV	1962	
Victor Manuel Ochoa	SLV	1966-1967	
Arnaldo da Silva	BRA	1967-1971	
Mario “Tiorra” Castro	SLV	February 1974- April 1974	
Jorge Tupinambá	BRA	May 1974- December 1974	
Carlos Campuzano Ramos	Chile	January 1975- April 1975	
Gregorio Bundio	ARG	April 1975-December 1975	
José Santacolomba	ARG ITA	1975	
Gregorio Bundio	ARG	1975-1976, 1979-1980	
Jorge Tupinambá	BRA	1987-1989	
Rubén Alonso	URU	1997-1998	
Ricardo López Tenorio	SLV	1998	
Carlos Farfán	SLV	1998	
Víctor Hugo Santillana	SLV	2003	

Alba-Acajutla

Name	Nationality	Years	Ref.
Rubén Alonso	URU	2008-2009	
Carlos Reyes	URU	2009	

Sonsonate (2009-2021)

Name	Nationality	Years	Ref.
Rubén Alonso	URU	2009-2010	
Cesar Acevedo "El Piscuchita"	SLV	2010	
Andrés Navarro	SLV	2011-2012	
Ivan Martínez	SLV	2012	
Rubén Alonso	URU	2013-January 2014	
Henry Rojas	SLV	Jan 2014–Feb 2014	
Wilson Sánchez *	COL	Feb 2014–March 2014	
Hector Jara	Chile	March 2014–June 2014	
Cesar Acevedo "El Piscuchita"	SLV	June 2014–Sept 2014	
Wilson Sánchez *	COL	Sept 2014–Oct 2014	
Alfonso Nerio	SLV	Oct 2014–Dec 2014	
Ivan 'Diablo' Ruiz	SLV	Jan 2015–June 2015	
German Pérez	HON	June 2015–Aug 2015	
Ennio Mendoza and Mario Guevara *	SLV	August 2015	
Hector Jara	Chile	August 2015– October 2015	
Edwin Portillo	SLV	Oct 2015 – April 2016	
William Renderos Iraheta	SLV	April 2016– May 2016	
Ennio Mendoza and Mario Guevara *	SLV	May 2016	
Agustin Castillo	PER	June 2016–February 2017	
Ernesto Góchez *	SLV	March 2017	
Eraldo Correia	BRA	March 2017–May 2017	
Garabet Avedissian	URU	May 2017-August 2017	
Rubén Alonso	URU	August 2017-February 2018	
Juan Ramon Sanchez	SLV	March 2018-July 2018	
Mario Elias Guevara	SLV	August 2018-September 2018	
Hugo Olevar	PAR	September 2018–December 2018	
Nelson Mauricio Ancheta	SLV	December 2018–February 2019	
Omar Pimentel Interim	SLV	February 2019–March 2019	
Rubén da Silva	URU	March 2019–January 2021	
Fabio Castromán	URU	January 2021–May 2021	
Hiatus	SLV	June 2021–present	

== Club records ==
- First victory in the Primera Division for Sonsonate: 1–0 Santa Tecla 28 January 2016
- First goalscorer in the Primera Division for Sonsonate: Augusto do Carmo v Dragon 1 November 2015
- Largest Home victory, Primera División: 3–0 v Pasaquina, 23 April 2018
- Largest Away victory, Primera División: 3–0 v FAS, 27 November 2016
- Largest Home loss, Primera División: 0–4 v Alianza, 12 December 2016
- Largest Away loss, Primera División: 0–4 v FAS, 3 April 2016
  0–4 v UES, 27 April 2016
- Highest home attendance: 81,000 v Primera División, 23 May 1959
- Highest away attendance: 127,621 v Primera División, Hampden Park, Glasgow, 18 May 1960
- Highest average attendance, season: 49,176, Primera División
- Most appearances, Primera División: 602, TBD 1972–1991
- Most goals scored, Primera División: 35, Primera División Apertura 2016
- Most goals scored, season, Primera División: 35, Primera División Apertura 2016

=== Individual records ===
- Record appearances (all competitions): TBD, 822 from 1957 to 1975
- Record appearances (Primera Division): Salvadoran Edson Melendez, 140 from 2016-2021
- Most capped player for El Salvador: 63 (0 whilst at Sonsonate), Juan Jose Gomez
- Most international caps for El Salvador while an El Vencedor player: 2, Henry Hernandez
- Most caps won whilst at Sonsonate: 2, Henry Hernandez.
- Record scorer in league: TBD, 396
- Most goals in a season (all competitions): TBD, 62 (1927/28) (47 in League, 15 in Cup competitions)
- Most goals in a season (Primera Division): Armando Polo, 13

=== Most appearances ===
Place	Name	Period	Primera Division	Playoffs	SLV Cup	Continental	Total
1	(El Salvador) Edson Melendez	2017–2021	140	0	0	0	**140**
2	(El Salvador) Marcos Adonay Rodriguez	2015-2017, 2019–2021	110	0	0	0	**110**
3	(El Salvador) Ivan Barahona	2015-2017, 2018–2019	94	0	0	0	94
4	(El Salvador) Roberto Gonzalez	2015, 2018–2021	81	0	0	0	**81**
5	(Brazil) Ze Paulo	2016–2017	68	0	0	0	**68**

Bolded players are currently on the Sonsonate roster.

=== Goals ===
Place	Name	Period	Primera Division	Playoffs	SLV Cup	Continental	Total
1	(Brazil) Odir Jacques	1966-67	TBD	0	0	0	**TBD**
2	(Brazil) Elenilson Franco	1968-1969	28	0	0	0	**28**
3	(El Salvador) Joaquin Pato Valencia	TBD	TBD	0	0	0	**TBD**
4	(El Salvador) Joaquin Pato Valencia	TBD	TBD	0	0	0	**TBD**
5	(El Salvador) Joaquin Pato Valencia	TBD	TBD	0	0	0	**TBD**

Bolded players are currently on the Once Deportivo roster.

=== Historical Matches ===
1971 Friendly	**Sonsonate**	**2-2**	**Red Star Belgrade**	San Salvador, El Salvador
	Jorge Cornejo Lievano		Goal	Stadium: TBD

August 5, 1998 Friendly	**Sonsonate**	**1-0**	**Bangu**	San Salvador, El Salvador
	Rene Martinez Valderrama 80'		Nil	Stadium: TBD

August 2, 1998 Friendly	**C.D. Sonsonate**	**1-2**	**Bangu**	San Salvador, El Salvador
	TBD		TBD	Stadium: Estadio Cuscatlan

August 4, 1998 Friendly	**C.D. Sonsonate**	**0-2**	**Bangu**	San Salvador, El Salvador
	Nil		TBD	Stadium: Estadio Cuscatlan
