= David Quesada =

American soccer player and coach

Personal information
- Date of birth: March 30, 1971 (age 55)
- Place of birth: Los Angeles, United States
- Height: 6 ft 2 in (1.88 m)
- Position: Forward

Youth career
- 1990–1991: San Diego State Aztecs

Senior career*
Years	Team	Apps	(Gls)
1992–1994	Alajuelense		
1994–1995	Ramonense		
1996–1997	Saprissa		
1996	→ FAS (loan)	1	(1)
1998	Los Angeles Galaxy	1	(0)
1998–1999	Herediano		

International career
1995	United States	1	(0)

Managerial career
- Claremont College (assistant)
- * Club domestic league appearances and goals

David Quesada (born March 30, 1971) is an American former soccer player who played as a forward in Costa Rica and the United States. He also earned one cap with the United States national team.

== Player ==
=== High school and college ===
Quesada attended La Cañada High School where he played on the boys' soccer team. As a senior, he won the CIF championship and was voted CIF MVP. First time in history La Cañada High School Soccer wins a CIF Championship. He was inducted into the school's Hall of Fame in 1995. After graduating from high school in 1989, he entered San Diego State University where he played two seasons on the men's soccer team.

=== Costa Rica ===
While spending the summer with family in Costa Rica after his sophomore season at San Diego, Quesada was offered a contract by L.D. Alajuelense. He signed with the team in 1992. In 1994, he moved to San Ramon and then Saprissa before returning to the U.S. in 1998. In 1996, Saprissa loaned Quesada to Club Deportivo FAS of El Salvador for the league championship game. Quesada scored the winning goal, then returned to Saprissa.

=== MLS ===
On March 24, 1998, the Los Angeles Galaxy of Major League Soccer signed Quesada as a discovery player. He played only nine minutes for the Galaxy after entering a June 7, 1998 game against the New England Revolution in the 81st minute for Steve Jolley. The Galaxy released him on June 17, 1998.

=== Amateur ===
In 2004, he played for the amateur Los Angeles Croatia in the West Coast Croatian Soccer Tournament.

=== National team ===
Quesada earned his one cap with the national team in a 2–1 loss to Costa Rica on May 28, 1995. He came on for John Kerr in the 88th minute. In August 1995, he played an unofficial national team game against Benfica in the Parmalat Cup.

== Coach ==
He currently coaches youth soccer in Glendale, California and is an assistant soccer coach with Claremont McKenna College.

In addition to playing and coaching soccer, Quesada owns a Bed and Breakfast in Alajuela, Costa Rica.
