= San Salvador crowd crush =

2023 disaster in El Salvador

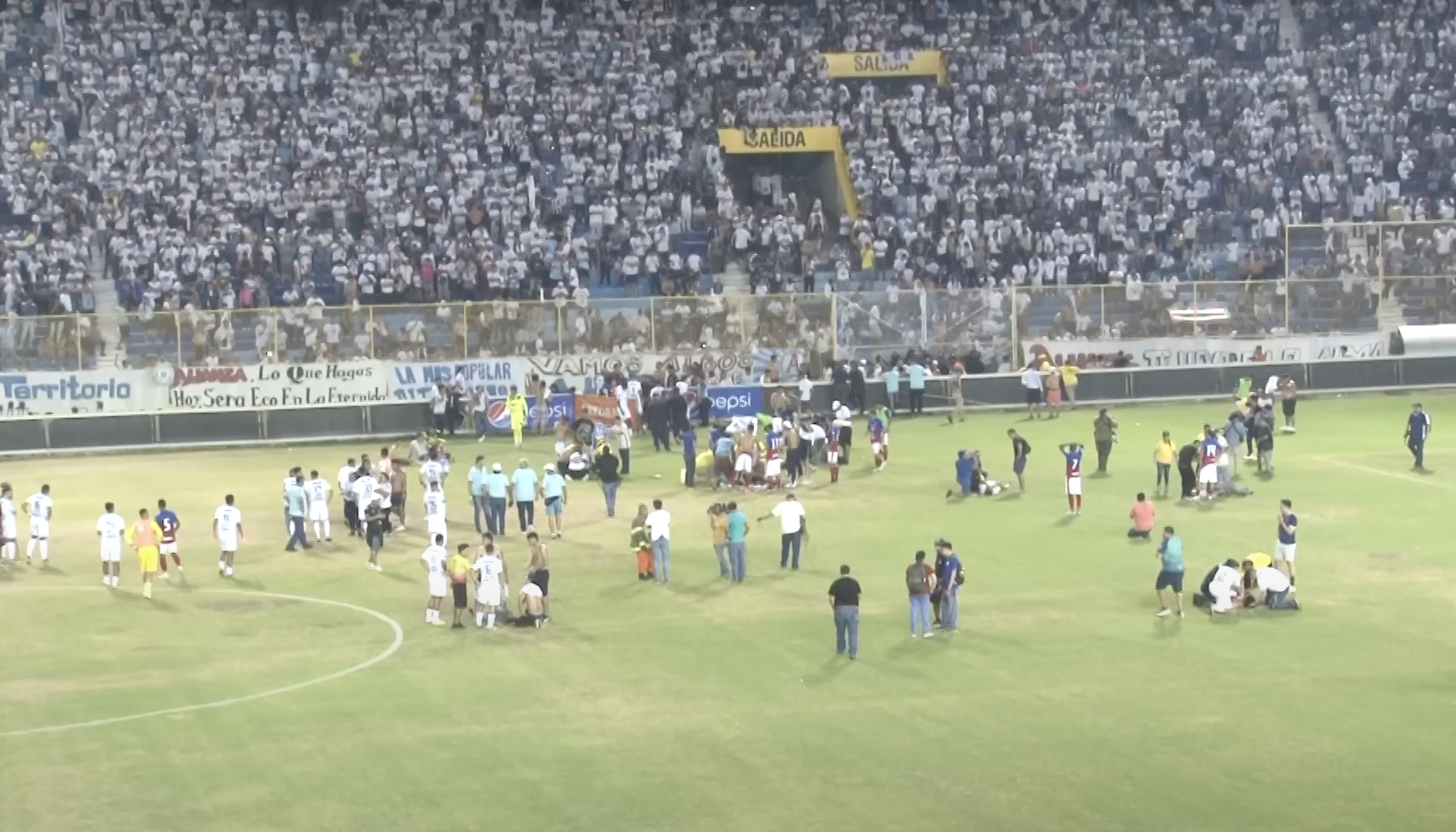
- Date: 20 May 2023
- Location: Estadio Cuscatlán, San Salvador, El Salvador
- Type: Crowd crush
- Cause: Possibly due to exceeding capacity limitations and counterfeit admissions (under investigation)
- Deaths: 12
- Injuries: ~500

On 20 May 2023, a crowd crush killed 12 people during a football match at Estadio Cuscatlán, a stadium in San Salvador, El Salvador. The incident happened during a Primera División match between clubs Alianza and FAS.

== Background ==
Estadio Cuscatlán is one of the largest stadiums in El Salvador, with a capacity of over 53,400 spectators. It is home to Alianza, who play in the Primera División, the country's top flight of association football.

== Incident ==
Alianza hosted the second leg of a 2023 Clausura quarterfinal against FAS, in which they were trailing 1–0 on aggregate. Before the game began, a group of fans gathered outside the stadium to enter, while others were entering the stadium.

Many of the first people who were already in the stadium watching the game were trapped as a result of the massive entry of people into the stadium, causing many moments of tension at that time. At least 12 people were killed and dozens of others were injured. Nine people were killed in the stadium and the other victims died in hospitals.

Although the reasons behind the tragedy are largely unknown, it has been confirmed that several supporters of the teams tried to force their way into the stadium to watch the football match. This caused a large crowd rush of hundreds of people making their way into the stadium despite the ongoing match.

== Reactions ==
All national level football matches that were due to take place the following day were suspended. Some football clubs and teams showed support via Twitter for the people affected by the tragedy, such as Cádiz, Real Madrid, Borussia Dortmund, and Atlético Madrid. Later, FESFUT stated that Alianza fans would be banned from the stadium for a year and that they had until 21 July 2023 to pay a $30,000 fine following the tragedy.

== See also ==
- Kanjurhan Stadium Disaster – a similar football incident that happened seven months earlier.
