= Ned Barbosa =

Brazilian footballer

Personal information
- Full name: Ned Barbosa de Souza
- Date of birth: 30 September 1958 (age 68)
- Place of birth: Salvador, Brazil
- Position: Forward

Youth career
- Fluminense de Feira

Senior career*
Years	Team	Apps	(Gls)
1976–1978	Fluminense de Feira		
1978	Corinthians	12	(0)
1979	Ferroviária		
1980–1982	Santiago Morning	12+	(1+)
1983	Deportes Laja	30	(19)
1984	Deportes Concepción	7	(9)
1984	Rangers	23	(11)
1985	Deportes Concepción	27	(11)
1986–1987	Águila		
1987	Deportes Temuco		
1988	Esmeraldas Petrolero		
1989	Deportes Temuco		
1989	Deportivo Cuenca		
1991	União Suzano		
1992	Delfín		

Managerial career
- Colo-Colo Melipilla (youth)
- Provincial Osorno (youth)
- 2003: Provincial Osorno
- 2004: Deportes Valdivia
- 2005: Universidad Central
- 2022: Pumas FC
- * Club domestic league appearances and goals

Ned Barbosa de Souza (born 30 September 1958), kwown as Ned Barbosa or simply Ned, is a Brazilian former football manager and player who played as a forward for clubs in Brazil, Chile, El Salvador and Ecuador.

== Career ==
Born in Salvador, Brazil, Ned started his career with Fluminense de Feira. Later he played for giant Corinthians in 1978 and Ferroviária in 1979.

In 1980, Barbosa moved to Chile and joined Santiago Morning. He helped them to return to the Chilean Primera División for the 1982 season.

Later, Barbosa played for Deportes Laja in 1983 before representing Deportes Concepción at the Campeonato de Apertura de la Segunda División de Chile in 1984.

In the second half of 1984, Barbosa played for Rangers de Talca in Chilean top division and returned to Deportes Concepción the next year.

Following Deportes Concepción, Barbosa played for Águila in El Salvador, Deportes Temuco in Chile and Esmeraldas Petrolero, Deportivo Cuenca and Delfín in Ecuador.

== Coaching career ==
Settled in Chile, Barbosa has worked as coach for the youth teams of clubs such as Colo-Colo and Provincial Osorno.

As head coach, he has led Provincial Osorno, Deportes Valdivia, Universidad Central and Pumas FC.
