= Excélsior F.C. =

- Full name: Excélsior Futbol Club
- Nickname(s): Estrellas negras, Azulgrana
- Founded: 1920
- Ground: El Salvador
- Capacity: To be determined
- Chairman: TBD
- Manager: (El Salvador) Jaime Gomez
- League: To be determined
- To be determined: To be determined
Home colours	Away colours

Excélsior F.C., full name Excélsior Futbol Club, was a professional soccer team that played in Santa Ana, El Salvador.

Excélsior competed in the national sports week soccer tournament that the Salvadoran Sports Commission held at that time.

== History ==
In 1928, Excélsior made its first appearance to the final, playing Hércules in Campo Marte. In the first match, they tied 1–1. A second match was played to determine a winner. In the replay match, they were defeated by Hércules, final score of 2–0.

The following year, they matched up again with two-time champion Hércules. In the first match, at the Finca Modelo, they beat Hércules 2–0. In the second leg, played at Campo Marte, Hércules edged out in a 3–1 win over. Excélsior withdrew from the third and deciding match due to complains about the officiating and extreme brutality from Hércules players. The Salvadoran Sports Commission ignored their appeal, so Excélsior forfeited as Hércules won their third straight national title.

== Honours ==
Excélsior's first trophy was the TBD, which they won in TBD. They won 1 Segunda División title in TBD.

Excélsior's honours include the following:

=== Domestic honours ===
==== Leagues ====
- Primera División de Fútbol de El Salvador
  - Runners up (2): 1928, 1929
- Segunda División Salvadorean and predecessors
  - Champions: (1): Liga de Ascenso 1970

== List of notable players ==
Players with senior international caps

- (El Salvador) Raúl Magaña
- (Chile) Efraín Santander

== Coaching staff ==
Position	Staff
Manager	(El Salvador) Jaime Gomez
Assistant Manager	(El Salvador) TBD
Reserve Manager	(El Salvador) TBD
Ladies's Manager	(El Salvador) TBD
Physical coach	(El Salvador) TBD
Assistant Physical coach	(El Salvador) TBD
Goalkeeper Coach	(El Salvador) TBD
Kineslogic	(El Salvador) TBD
Utility Equipment	(El Salvador) TBD
Football director	(El Salvador) Ruben Guevara
Team Doctor	(El Salvador) TBD

== List of coaches ==
- (El Salvador) Eduardo Corera (1971)
- (Chile) Hernan Carrasco Vivanco (1972)
- (El Salvador) Mauricio Mora (1973)
- (El Salvador) Jaime Gomez (December 2023-Present)
