= Chinameca S.C. =

Salvadoran professional football club

Chacarita Juniors
- Full name: Chacarita Juniors
- Founded: 1914
- Ground: Municipal De Chinameca, San Miguel, El Salvador
- Manager: Nelson Alvarenga

Chinameca Sporting Club, commonly known as Chinameca S.C. now called Chacarita Juniors are a Salvadoran professional football club based in San Miguel.

== History ==
=== Chinameca Sporting Club ===
They were first team to win the top flight Primera División in 1926–1927 but have had a turbulent history, even disappearing from the local football scene for a while. They only returned to the Third Division in 2005 and withdrew from that competition in February 2010 citing lack of support from their fans.

== Honours ==
- Top flight Primera División: 1

1926
