= Quequeisque F.C. =

- Full name: Quequeisque Fútbol Club
- Nicknames: Hoja Brava; QQQ
- Founded: 1896
- Ground: Estadio Las Delicias
- Chairman: Jorge Rosa
- Manager: Jorge Calles
- League: Segunda División de El Salvador

Quequeisque was a professional football club in Nueva San Salvador, El Salvador, which have played the Primera División de Fútbol Profesional.

They are the only team in El Salvador besides Hércules in soccer history to win 5 or more straight championships (Salvadoran football champions). Although the tournaments won were only in the Central Zone Region of El Salvador, they are often considered as national titles.

== History ==
Quequeisque were founded in 1896, being one of the first football clubs founded in El Salvador. They got their name from the Quequeisque farm from Santa Tecla. Walter Soundy (Scottish second generation) a notable person in Santa Tecla was the founder of the team, he was the owner of the Quequeisque farm. The team won five straight titles albeit only from the central district of El Salvador. These titles are still recognized as national titles.

They participated in the very first truly national tournament in 1947 and continued until the 1963–64 season when they were relegated. The club became defunct in 1968.

However, in 2015, Jorge Rosa purchased the license of former team Real Destroyer, and the club was brought back from almost fifty years hiatus and competed in the 2015–2016 Segunda division.

The venture lasted one year before they changed name and moved operations to Izalco and became Brujos de Izalco.

== Records ==
=== Club records ===
- First Match (prior to creation of a league): vs. TBD (a club from TBD), Year
- First Match (official): vs. TBD, year
- Most points in La Primera: 00 points (00 win, 00 draws, 0 losses) Year/Year
- Least points in La Primera: 00 points (0 win, 0 draws, 00 losses) Year/year

=== Individual records ===
- Most capped player for El Salvador: 50 (0 whilst at Quequeisque), TBD
- Most international caps for El Salvador while a Quequeisque player: 1, TBD
- Most goals in a season, all competitions: unknown player, O (Year/year) (00 in League, 00 in Cup competitions)
- Most goals in a season, La Primera: TBD, 7

== Honours ==
- First Division League Championship: 5

1941, 1942, 1943, 1944, 1945

- Second Division League Championship(s): 1

1961–62

== Colours and past kits ==
1941–68	2015–

Originally the club colours were black and white with stripes and black shorts. They used a red uniform and this was used until 1968 when they dissolved. However, when the club were resurrected in 2015 they chose to play in a white shirt with blue strips. In 2016 they returned to their original colours black and white.

== Current squad ==
As of Apertura 2015: Note: Flags indicate national team as defined under FIFA eligibility rules; some limited exceptions apply. Players may hold more than one non-FIFA nationality.

No.	Pos.	Nation	Player
—	GK	COL	José Aguilar
9	FW	SLV	Douglas Gil
—		SLV	José Escobar
—		PER	Fernando Montes
—		SLV	Napoleòn Baires
—		SLV	Omar Amaya
—		SLV	Carlos Martinez
—		MEX	Mario Castellanos
—		SLV	Raul Mas

No.	Pos.	Nation	Player
—		PER	Jorge Ruiz
—		SLV	Rodrigo Medrano
—		SLV	Christian Escobar
—		SLV	Elmer Hernandez
—		SLV	Ramirez
—		BOL	José Arce
—		SLV	Dexter Jiron
—		SLV	Antonio Portillo
—	GK	SLV	Christian Perez

== Notable Players Quequeisque F.C. ==
Players marked in bold gained their caps while playing at Quequeisque F.C.

- (El Salvador) Adrian Diaz
- (El Salvador) Miguel Ezequiel Campos
- (El Salvador) Jorge René Méndez
- (El Salvador) Miguel José Deras
- (El Salvador)
- (El Salvador)

=== Internationals who have played at Quequeisque ===
Players marked in bold gained their caps while playing at Quequeisque.

- (El Salvador) Gualberto Fernández

=== Individual awards won at Quequeisque ===
- (El Salvador) Jose Miguel Palacios Camion (Top goalscorer 1976 Liga de Ascenso - 23 goals)

== List of coaches ==
- Pablo Ferrer Elias (1938–1942)
- Conrado Miranda (1965)
- Jorge Calles (July 2015 – Nov 2015)
- Mauricio Alfaro (Nov 2015 – Feb 2016)
- Luis Guevara Mora (Feb 2016– Sep 2016)
- Jorge Calles (Sep 2016–)

== Notable coaches ==
- (Argentina) Marcelo Estrada
- (El Salvador) Jorge Cabrera Rajo
