= España F.C. =

Defunct Salvadoran football club

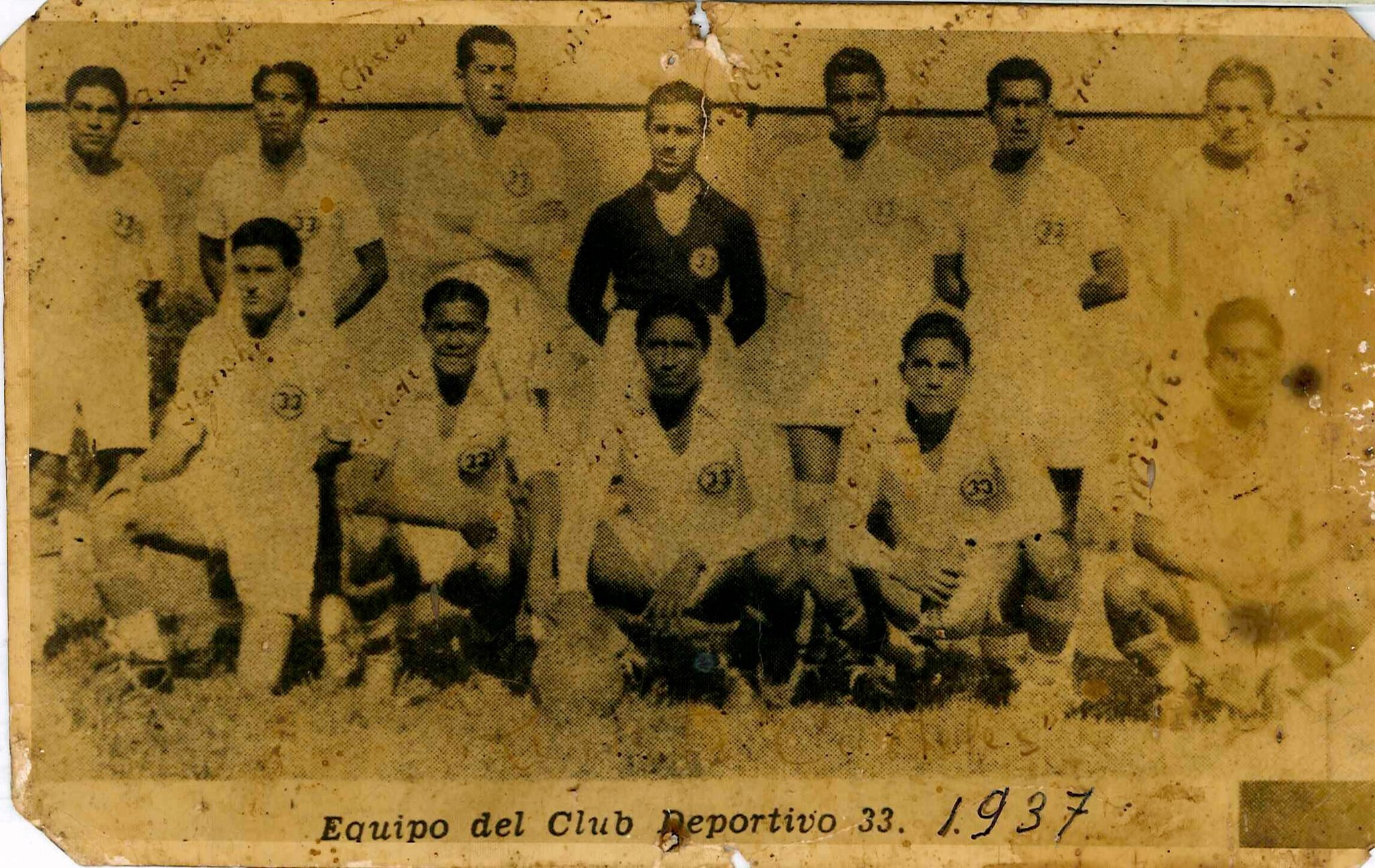
- C.D. 33 in 1937.
- Full name: Atlético España Fútbol Club
- Founded: 25 February 1933 (as CD 33)
- Dissolved: 1941
- Ground: Estadio Nacional de la Flor Blanca
- Capacity: 32,000
- League: First Division of Football

España F.C. (full name: Atlético España Fútbol Club), and originally known as Club Deportivo 33 (C.D. 33), was a professional association football club located in San Salvador, El Salvador. España F.C. played their home matches at the Estadio Nacional Flor Blanca.

== History ==
Club Deportivo 33 was founded on 25 February 1933 by the Civilian Police force.

During the 1930s, Club Deportivo 33 competed in the central zone football tournament that was held by the Salvadoran Sports Commission. They won two national tournament finals in 1937 (3–1 vs. C.D. Alacranes) and in 1938 (10–3 vs. C.D. Maya). In 1939, C.D. 33 won the central zone in El Salvador. Since there was no official national tournament held that year, this central region zone title was considered a national title. On 30 August 1940, C.D. 33 renamed and rebranded themselves as Atlético España F.C.

In 1940, España F.C. won the central zone tournament. Since there was no official national football tournament in El Salvador that year, this championship was considered as the national title.

The club dissolved in 1941.

== Honors ==
España F.C. honors
Competition	Titles	Seasons
First Division of Football	3	1937, 1938, 1939
Central Zone	4	1937, 1938, 1939, 1940 (Note: The 1939 and 1940 Central Zone championships are considered by the Salvadoran Football Federation as also being national titles.)

== Notable managers ==
- (El Salvador) Emilio Guardado
- (Costa Rica) Roberto Cenizo Calderón (1935–1936) (Player-coach)
