= Libertad F.C. (El Salvador) =

Libertad FC
- Full name: Libertad Fútbol Club
- Nickname(s): Blancos
- Founded: 1930
- Dissolved: 1950
- Ground: Estadio Nacional De la Flor Blanca
- Capacity: 32,000
Home colours	Away colours

Libertad F.C., full name Libertad Futbol Club, was a professional soccer team in La Libertad, La Libertad, El Salvador.

== History ==
In 1946, Libertad F.C. won their first and only national title, defeating Oriental Zone winners C.D. Luis Ángel Firpo and Occidental Zone winners Once Municipal in a national final round tournament. Libertad F.C. were the Central Zone winners. In the final round, they won three games, defeating C.D. Luis Ángel Firpo twice and Once Municipal once. The final scheduled game vs. Once Municipal that tournament was not played due to irrelevance of the game, having already clinched the national title. In the 1948–49 national season league, Libertad F.C. finished runners-up, with a record of 14 wins, 8 draws and 2 losses.

== Other stadiums ==
- Estadio San Mathias

== Achievements ==
- Primera División de Fútbol Profesional:
- Winners (1): 1946
- Runners-up (1): 1948–49

== Former coaches ==
- (El Salvador) Manolo Amador (1942)
- (Costa Rica) Aníbal Ñeco Varela (Player/coach) (1947–1949)
