= C.D. Santiagueño =

Salvadoran football club

- Full name: Club Deportivo Santiagueño
- Nickname(s): "Los diablos rojos" (The Red Devils)
- Founded: 1917
- Ground: Estadio Municipal de Santiago de María; Santiago de María, El Salvador
- League: Segunda Division
- 2022 Apertura: Champions
Home colours	Away colours

Club Deportivo Santiagueño is a Salvadoran professional football club from Santiago de María, Usulután. The club currently plays in the Segunda Division.

C.D. Santiagueño won the Salvadoran Premier Division title in the 1979–80 season.

== History ==
=== 1979–1980 ===
After clinching fourth place in the regular league season, the club won the national title in the final round. In the final group round of four teams, Santiagueño beat Águila, FAS and Independiente Nacional 1906 to finish top of the group with five wins and only one defeat.

=== Subsequent years ===
The following season, in 1980–81, they clinched the regular season league title. In the finals, however, they fell short to Atlético Marte, losing 2–1 in the first leg, and 3–1 in the second leg. Both games were played in the Estadio Cuscatlán. Despite winning the title two years previous the team were relegated to Second Division in 1982. They were relegated from the Third Division in 2007.

== Honours ==
Santiagueno's first trophy was the TBD, which they won in 1981. Their first league honour came in 1979–1980, when they won the 1979–80 Primera División de Fútbol de El Salvador title

Santiagueno's honours include the following:

=== Domestic honours ===
==== Leagues ====
- Primera División de Fútbol de El Salvador
  - Champions (1): 1979–80
- Segunda División Salvadorean and predecessors
  - Champions (1):
- Tercera Division and predecessors
  - Champions: (1): 2022 Apertura

== Current squad ==
Updated September 2023. Note: Flags indicate national team as defined under FIFA eligibility rules; some limited exceptions apply. Players may hold more than one non-FIFA nationality.

No.	Pos.	Nation	Player
—		SLV	Mario Alfaro
—		COL	Victor Hinestroza
—		SLV	Blas Lizama
—		SLV	William Campos
—		SLV	Ever García
—		SLV	Samuel Palacios
—		SLV	

No.	Pos.	Nation	Player
—		SLV	
—		SLV	
—		SLV	

=== Players with dual citizenship ===
- (El Salvador) (Honduras) Gregory Costly

=== In ===
Note: Flags indicate national team as defined under FIFA eligibility rules; some limited exceptions apply. Players may hold more than one non-FIFA nationality.

No.	Pos.	Nation	Player
—	GK	SLV	Daniel Gutierrez (From Topiltzín)
—	MF	SLV	Rudy Batres (From Topiltzín)
—	MF	SLV	Darwin Nieto (From Topiltzín)
—		COL	Duban Mosquera (From Pipil)

No.	Pos.	Nation	Player
—		HON	Gregory Costly (From Pipil)
—		SLV	TBD (From TBD)
—		SLV	TBD (From TBD)

=== Out ===
Note: Flags indicate national team as defined under FIFA eligibility rules; some limited exceptions apply. Players may hold more than one non-FIFA nationality.

No.	Pos.	Nation	Player
—		SLV	Blas Lizama (To Fuerte San Francisco)
—		SLV	Mario Machado (To Dragon)
—		SLV	Ever García (To Dragon)
—		SLV	Kevin Coreas (To TBD)
—		SLV	Cristian Giron (To TBD)

No.	Pos.	Nation	Player
—		SLV	Miguel Ramirez (To TBD)
—		SLV	TBD (To TBD)
—		SLV	TBD (To TBD)

=== Captains ===
Position	Player	Years as Captain
GK	(El Salvador) TBD (+)	TBD
LW	(El Salvador) Juan Gilberto Quinteros	1978
MF	(El Salvador) Ever García	2023
MF	(El Salvador) TBD (+)	2024-Present

== Records ==
=== Club records ===
- First Match (prior to creation of a league): vs. TBD (a club from TBD), Year
- First Match (official): vs. TBD, year
- Most points in La Primera: 00 points (00 win, 00 draws, 0 losses) Year/Year
- Least points in La Primera: 00 points (0 win, 0 draws, 00 losses) Year/year

=== Individual records ===
- Most capped player for El Salvador: 50 (0 whilst at Santiagueno), TBD
- Most international caps for El Salvador while a Santiagueno player: 1, TBD
- Most goals in a season, all competitions: unknown player, O (Year/year) (00 in League, 00 in Cup competitions)
- Most goals in a season, La Primera: TBD, 7

=== Santiagueño in international competition ===
- 1R = First Round

Season	Competition	Round	Land	Club	Score
Copa Fraternidad 1980	Copa Interclubes UNCAF	1R	(Guatemala)	CSD Municipal	2–1, 2–5

Season	Competition	Round	Land	Club	Score
Copa Fraternidad 1981	Copa Interclubes UNCAF	1R	(Guatemala)	CD Suchitepéquez	2–2, 2–3

== List of coaches ==
Argentina

- (Argentina) Raúl Miralles (1979)

Brazil

- (Brazil) Eraldo Correia (June 2021–2021)
- (Brazil) Eraldo Correia (January 2023 – February 2023)

Chile

- (Chile) Javier Mascaró

El Salvador

- (El Salvador) Juan Antonio Merlos "Maquinita" (1979–80)
- (El Salvador) Miguel Aguilar Obando (1996)
- (El Salvador) Luis Alonso Santana "El Chispo"
- (El Salvador) Ever Mejia (December 2021 – February 2022)
- (El Salvador) Miguel Águilar Obando (June 2022 – December 2022)

Guatemala

- (Guatemala) Rafael Osorio (1980–1981)

== Stadium ==
- Estadio Municipal de Santiago de María
  - Estadio Leonidas Flores Cárdenas
