= Primera División de El Salvador =

Salvadoran association football league

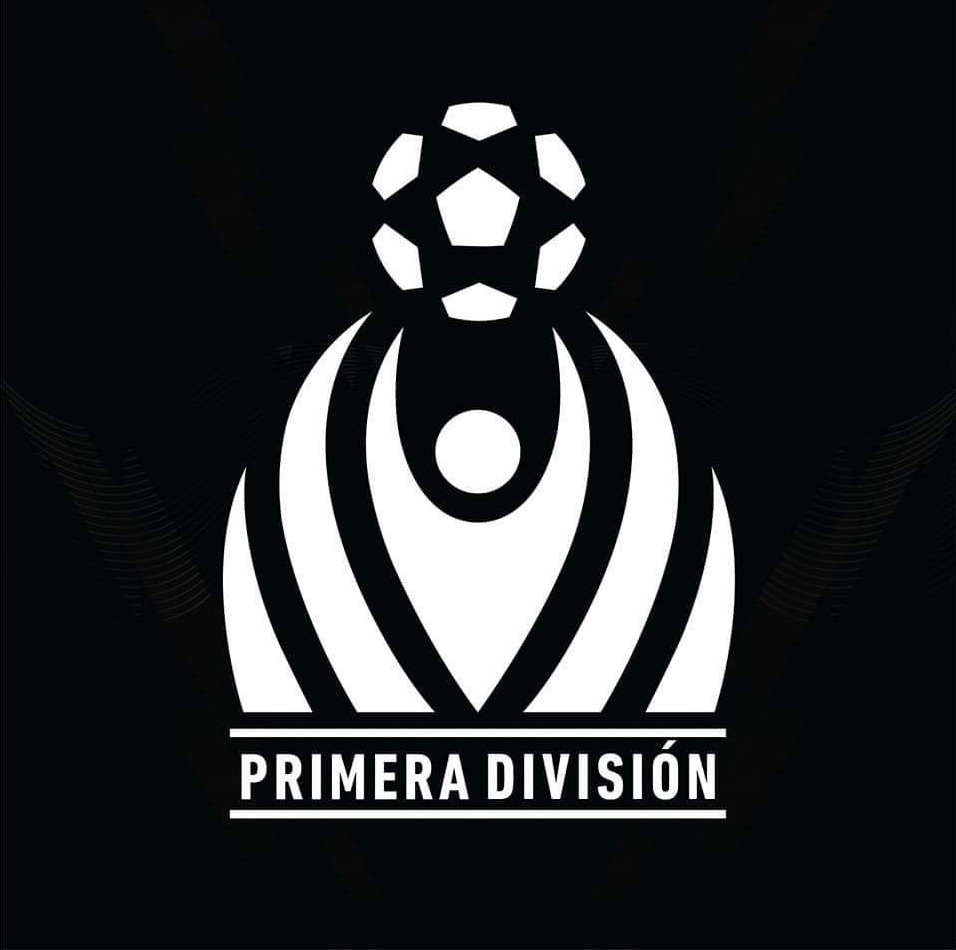
- Founded: 1947
- Country: El Salvador
- Confederation: CONCACAF
- Number of clubs: 12
- Level on pyramid: 1
- Relegation to: Segunda División
- League cup(s): Copa Presidente (1939–2013, 2026-present); Copa Independencia (2014); Copa Claro (2016–2018)
- International cup(s): Regional; CONCACAF Central American Cup; Continental; CONCACAF Champions Cup
- Current champions: FAS (20th title)
- Most championships: FAS (20 titles)
- Top scorer: Nicolás Muñoz (303 goals)
- Broadcasters: Canal 4 Tigo Sports; Fox (Latin America)
- Sponsors: Pepsi (2015 - 2026); GanaPlay (2026 - present)
- Website: laprimera.com.sv
- Current: 2026–27 Primera División de El Salvador

The Primera División de Fútbol Profesional de El Salvador (First Division of Professional Football of El Salvador), more commonly known as La Liga Mayor or La Primera, also known as Liga GanaPlay (formerly as Liga Pepsi) for sponsorship reasons, is the top professional football league in El Salvador.

It was established in 1947, and in 2011 had 10 clubs. Initially the league was run as a year-long tournament, but since 1998 there are two tournaments each year, much like in many other football leagues in the Americas.

The Apertura season runs from July to December, while the Clausura season runs from January to May.

Of the 56 teams to have competed in the league, FAS has won the title 20 times, followed by Alianza (19), Aguila (17), Firpo (11) and Isidro Metapan (10)

== Competition format ==
La Liga Mayor follows the usual double round-robin format.

During the course of a given season (Apertura or Clausura), each club plays every other club twice, once at home and once away, for a total of 22 games.

Teams receive three points for a win, one point for a draw, and no points for a loss. Teams are ranked by total points, with the top eight clubs at the end of the season progressing through to the finals.

If points are equal between two or more clubs, goal difference usually determines their placement.

Although when it comes to qualifying for the finals, if the team in eighth and ninth spot are equal on points, then a Repechaje or Playoff is needed to determine which team gains entry into finals.

A system of relegation exists between the Primera División and the Segunda División.

In May each year, at the conclusion of both the apertura and clausura seasons, the team with the fewest points on aggregate over both seasons, is automatically relegated to the Segunda División.

=== CONCACAF Central American Cup ===
La Liga Mayor has three guaranteed spots in the CONCACAF Central American Cup. The winner of each apertura and clausura season gains automatic entry into this tournament. To determine the third spot, aggregate points over both seasons is used, the best no-champion team in the season qualified to the tournament. If the same team is to win both the apertura and clausura seasons, the last spot belongs to the second best no-champion team in the season.

== History ==
=== Foundation ===
In 1921, the Salvadoran Sports Commission (Comisión Nacional de Educación Física) held its first National Sports Week. Although initially this event did not include any participation from football clubs, it would go on to be the basis of what would grow to be the Liga Mayor of today. In 1924, due to high demand, the commission included a football tournament in the annual Sports Week. Due to the enormous success of this event, it was decided that starting in 1926 the Sports Week tournament would in turn become the country's official National Football Championship. The championship was to be contended by three teams who represent the three different zones of the country playing in a double round robin format. The first three teams to compete in the tournament were, Nequepio (Central Zone), Chinameca Sporting Club (Eastern Zone) and Olímpic (Western Zone). This format was used until 1930.

=== Controversy ===
Controversy occurred after the 1929–30 championship when finalists Excélsior F.C. (who represented the western zone) complained that the second leg of the final against Hércules should not be registered, as they felt that the referee in that game had helped Hércules win the title. The Sports Commission did not agree and the result was not changed. As a result, Excélsior F.C. withdrew from the tournament and Hércules was crowned champion. This led to there being talk of corruption from event organisers against teams from the western part of the country, and as a result teams from that zone refused to take part in any of the following Championships. Because of this there was no national playoff held again until 1937.

=== Return of the National Championship ===
The national championship returned to its original format in 1937, but was short lived, as once again, teams complained of there still being corruption within the tournament. Again as a result, there was no national championship during 1939 and 1941. Although no national championship was played, there was still regional championships which over time are now considered to be legitimate national championships.

=== Introduction of a league format ===
In 1947 the Salvadoran Football Federation tried to organize a National Championship in league format, but this proved to be unsuccessful and the tournament was suspended after only a few rounds. It proved to be more successful the following season, but was postponed once again in 1949. Although this new format did not begin very well, because of a lack of organisation, it did prove to work very well during the 1950 championship, and throughout the 1950s.

=== The league begins to form ===
The 1950s saw interest in the league begin to grow nationwide and although the league did have some problems, with teams dropping out at the end of any given season, it would not affect the league as a whole, as there were various new teams that were anxious to take part in the league and take the place of those that had left. In 1955, league organisers announced that the championship would now be played out in a double round robin format, with a maximum of 10 teams taking part in the league. This year also saw the introduction of promotion and relegation into the league.

=== Switch to Apertura/Clausura format ===
In 1998, league officials decided to change the league format from a yearlong tournament to an Apertura/Clausura schedule, with the hope that it would garner more interest in the league and give a chance for its player to rest between seasons.

=== Annex Major League Soccer El Salvador ===
These are the three league format that existed in Salvadoran national football league until now

- Short Tournament (1926–1946)

Three regional champions, faced each other in the national championship. Each team represented a different section of the country (West zone, Central zone, East zone).

- League System (1947–1997)

This format consisted of all against all and twelve national teams participated.

- Apertura/Clausura format (1999–present)

The current league format, consisting of two short football tournaments annually mind between opening and closing ceremonies are held.

=== New league format 2015/2016 ===
For the 2015–16 season, the league will have 12 teams leaving behind 10 team years. With the approval of this new format, major league soccer Cadre El Salvador, seeks to be more competitive and bring football to more people throughout the country.

== Clubs ==
The following 12 teams are competing in the 2025–26 Primera División season.

Location of teams in 2024–2025 Primera División de El Salvador

Team	Location	Stadium	Capacity
Alianza	San Salvador	Estadio Cuscatlán	53,400
Aguila	San Miguel	Estadio Juan Francisco Barraza	10,000
C.D. FAS	Santa Ana	Estadio Óscar Quiteño	17,500
Fuerte San Francisco	San Francisco Gotera	Estadio Correcaminos	12,000
L.A. Firpo	Usulután	Estadio Sergio Torres	5,000
Inter Santa Tecla	Santa Tecla	Estadio Las Delicias	10,000
Isidro Metapan	Metapán	Estadio Jorge Calero Suárez	10,000
Platense	Zacatecoluca	Estadio Antonio Toledo Valle	10,000
Municipal Limeño	Santa Rosa de Lima	Estadio Ramòn Berrios	5,000
Atlético Balboa	San Salvador	Estadio Cuscatlán	53,400
Cacahuatique	Ciudad Barrios San Miguel	Poli-Deportivo Ecológico El Amaton	5,000
INCA-Aruba	Sonsonate	Estadio Anna Mercedes Campos	10,000

== Sponsorship ==
ON January 2023, league president Pedro David Hernández announced Instituto Nacional de los Deportes de El Salvador INDES as the official sponsor, with the goal of modernizing the league's image. The contract was signed for seven years worth estimated 9 million dollars

Since 2021, Pioneer Deportes has been the official match ball manufacturer. In 2021, the contract was extended for three years concluding until 2024. In 2024, Molten was announced to be the new ball sponsor.

Companies that currently has sponsorship deals with for 2025-2026 include:

- (Japan) Molten Corporation – Official Ball Suppliers
- (El Salvador) BetPro – Official sponsors
- (El Salvador) INDES – Official sponsors
- (El Salvador) GanaPlay – Official sponsors

== Team presidents ==
As of December 2025

No.	Name	Team president
1	Rigoberto Ortiz Ostorga	Águila
2	Gonzalo Sibrian	Alianza
3	Juan Amaya	Cacahuatique
4	Ismael Guzmán	Fuerte San Francisco
5	José Sincuir	FAS
6	Ronny Hernández	Firpo
7	Francisco Cruz Martínez	Atlético Balboa
8	José Ortíz	Inter FA
9	Alberto Rivera	Isidro Metapán
10	Eduardo Chávez	Municipal Limeño
11	Carlos Burgos	Platense
12	Elmer Alcides Salazar	INCA-Aruba

== Important matches ==
- FAS vs Águila "Clásico Nacional"
- Alianza vs Firpo "Clásico Joven"
- FAS vs Isidro Metapán "Derbi Santaneco"
- Águila vs Firpo "Derbi de Oriente"
- Alianza vs Atlético Marte "Derbi Capitalino"
- FAS vs Firpo "Clasico de los 90s"
- Dragón vs Águila " Derbi Migueleño"
- Jocoro vs Fuerte San Francisco " Derbi Morazeño"

== International broadcasters ==
=== Americas ===
Country	Broadcasters
Argentina; Bolivia; Costa Rica; Guatemala; Honduras; Panama; Paraguay	Fox
Canada	beIN Sports
Mexico	TV Azteca
United States	beIN Sports

=== Middle East and North Africa ===
Country	Broadcasters
MENA	beIN Sports

== Performance by club ==
Teams in bold are currently participating in La Liga Mayor.

- (#) – Current Primera Division Champion
- (†) – Defunct national team

Team	Champions	Runners-up	Winning years
**FAS**	20	23	1951–52, 1953–54, 1957–58, 1961–62, 1962, 1977–78, 1978–79, 1981, 1984, 1994–95, 1995–96, Clausura 2002, Apertura 2002, Apertura 2003, Apertura 2004, Clausura 2005, Apertura 2009, Clausura 2021, Apertura 2022, Clausura 2026
**Alianza**	19	16	1965–66, 1966–67, 1986–87, 1989–90, 1993–94, 1996–97, Apertura 1998, Apertura 2001, Clausura 2004, Clausura 2011, Apertura 2015, Apertura 2017, Clausura 2018, Apertura 2019, Apertura 2020, Apertura 2021, Clausura 2022, Clausura 2024, 2025 Clausura
**Águila**	17	14	1959, 1960–61, 1963–64, 1964, 1967–68, 1972, 1975–76, 1976–77, 1983, 1987–88, Apertura 1999, Apertura 2000, Clausura 2001, Clausura 2006, Clausura 2012, Clausura 2019, Apertura 2023
**Luis Ángel Firpo** (#)	11	11	1988–89, 1990–91, 1991–92, 1992–93, 1997–98, 1999 Clausura, 2000 Clausura, Apertura 2007, Clausura 2008, Clausura 2013, Apertura 2025
**Isidro Metapán**	10	3	Clausura 2007, Apertura 2008, Clausura 2009, Clausura 2010, Apertura 2010, Apertura 2011, Apertura 2012, Apertura 2013, Clausura 2014, Apertura 2014
Atlético Marte†	8	–	1955, 1955–56, 1956–57, 1969, 1970, 1980–81, 1982, 1985
**Hércules**	7	–	1927, 1928, 1929–30, 1930–31, 1931–32, 1932–33, 1933–34
Quequeisque†	5	–	1941, 1942, 1943, 1944, 1945
Santa Tecla†	4	2	Clausura 2015, Apertura 2016, Clausura 2017, Apertura 2018
**Dragón**	3	3	1950–51, 1952–53, Clausura 2016
C.D. 33†	3	–	1937, 1938, 1939
Once Municipal†	2	6	1948–49, Apertura 2006
Juventud Olímpica	2	4	1971, 1973
Maya†	2	1	1934–35, 1935–36
Santiagueño†	1	1	1979–80
San Salvador†	1	1	Clausura 2003
Chinameca S.C.	1	1	1926
Libertad†	1	1	1946
**Platense**	1	1	1974–75
España†	1	–	1940
Vista Hermosa†	1	–	Apertura 2005
Once Deportivo†	1	–	Apertura 2024

=== Former teams ===
Name	City	Foundation	Dissolved
Vista Hermosa	San Francisco Gotera (Morazán)	1999	2012
Atlético Balboa	La Unión (La Unión)	1950	2010
San Salvador	San Salvador (San Salvador)	2002	2008
Independiente Nacional 1906	San Vicente (San Vicente)	1946	2007
Juventud Olímpica†	San Salvador (San Salvador)	1939	2007
ADET	La Libertad (La Libertad)	1974	2001
Santiagueño	Santiago de María (Usulután)	1970	1985
Quequeisque	Santa Tecla (La Libertad)	1896	1968
Libertad	La Libertad (La Libertad)	1930	1950
España Atletico	San Salvador (San Salvador)	1930	1941
Hércules	San Salvador (San Salvador)	1920	1939
Deportivo 33	San Salvador (San Salvador)	1933	1940
ADET	La Libertad (La Libertad)	1974	2001
Coca Cola	San Salvador (San Salvador)	1930	2007
Atlante	San Alejo (La Unión)	1930	1955
Excélsior	Santa Ana (Santa Ana)	1928	1945

=== Player records (Liga Mayor de Futbol) ===
Statistics below are for all-time leaders who are still playing. Statistics are for regular season only.

**Goals**
Rank	Player	Goals
1	Williams Reyes	170
2	Nicolás Muñoz	120
3	Alex Bentos	100
4	Fito Zelaya	75
5	Mágico González	70

**Assists**
Rank	Player	Assists
1	Mauricio Cienfuegos	400
2	Mágico González	68
3	Osael Romero	65
4	Óscar Cerén	46
5	Gerson Mayen	45
5	Darwin Cerén	45

**Shutouts**
Rank	Player	Shutouts
1	Cristian Álvarez	118
2	Elder Figueroa	82
3	Jaime Alas	55
4	Léster Blanco	53
5	Nenei de Melo	35

**Games Played**
Rank	Player	Games
1	Williams Reyes	375
2	Cristian Álvarez	359
3	Mágico González	345
4	Misael Alfaro	334
5	Meme Gonzalez	324

== Short Tournament (1926–1946) ==
Three regional champions, faced each other in the national championship. Each team represented a different section of the country (West zone, Central zone, East zone).

Season	Champion	Runner-up
1926	Chinameca	Nequepio
1927	Hércules	Chinameca
1928	Hércules	Excélsior F.C.
1929–30	Hércules	Excélsior F.C.
1930–31^{*}	Hércules	
1931–32^{*}	Hércules	
1932–33^{*}	Hércules	
1933–34^{*}	Hércules	
1934–35^{*}	C.D. Maya	
1935–36^{*}	C.D. Maya	
1937	C.D. 33	C.D. Alacranes
1938	C.D. 33	C.D. Maya
1939^{*}	C.D. 33	
1940^{*}	España F.C.	
1941^{*}	Quequeisque	
1942	Quequeisque	Juventud Olímpica
1943	Quequeisque	Ferrocarril
1944^{*}	Quequeisque	
1945^{*}	Quequeisque	
1946	Libertad	Once Municipal

^{*} – There was no national championship held during this year, only regional championships. These championships are now often considered national titles.

== League System (1947–1997) ==
Season	Champion	Runner-up
1947 ^{(**)}	No national championship was held during these years	
1948-49	Once Municipal	Libertad
1949–50 ^{(**)}	No national championship was held during these years	
1950–51	C.D. Dragón	C.D. FAS
1951–52	C.D. FAS	Leones
1952–53	C.D. Dragón	Juventud Olímpica
1953–54	C.D. FAS	C.D. Dragón
1955	Atlético Marte	C.D. Dragón
1955–56	Atlético Marte	L.A. Firpo
1956–57	Atlético Marte	Atlante
1957–58	C.D. FAS	Once Municipal
1959	C.D. Águila	C.D. FAS
1960–61	C.D. Águila	C.D. FAS
1961–62	C.D. FAS	C.D. Águila
1962	C.D. FAS	Atlante
1963–64	C.D. Águila	Juventud Olímpica
1964	C.D. Águila	C.D. FAS
1965–66	Alianza F.C.	Once Municipal
1966–67	Alianza F.C.	C.D. Águila
1967–68	C.D. Águila	C.D. FAS
1968–69	Atlético Marte	C.D. FAS
1970	Atlético Marte	C.D. FAS
1971	Juventud Olímpica	Alianza F.C.
1972	C.D. Águila	Juventud Olímpica
1973	Juventud Olímpica	Alianza F.C.
1974–75	C.D. Platense	Negocios Internacionales
1975–76	C.D. Águila	Alianza F.C.
1976–77	C.D. Águila	Once Municipal
1977–78	C.D. FAS	Once Municipal
1978–79	C.D. FAS	Alianza F.C.
1979–80	C.D Santiagueño	C.D. Águila
1980–81	Atlético Marte	C.D Santiagueño
1981	C.D. FAS	Independiente Nacional 1906
1982	Atlético Marte	Independiente Nacional 1906
1983	C.D. Águila	C.D. FAS
1984	C.D. FAS	C.D. Águila
1985	Atlético Marte	Alianza F.C.
1986–87	Alianza F.C.	C.D. Águila
1987–88	C.D. Águila	C.D. FAS
1988–89	L.A. Firpo	Cojutepeque F.C.
1989–90	Alianza F.C.	L.A. Firpo
1990–91	L.A. Firpo	C.D. Águila
1991–92	L.A. Firpo	Alianza F.C.
1992–93	L.A. Firpo	Alianza F.C.
1993–94	Alianza F.C.	C.D. FAS
1994–95	C.D. FAS	L.A. Firpo
1995–96	C.D. FAS	L.A. Firpo
1996–97	Alianza F.C.	L.A. Firpo
1997–98	L.A. Firpo	C.D. FAS

^{**} - No national championship was held during these years

== Apertura/Clausura format (1999–present) ==
Season	Champion (Note: The first winner of the shorter tournament has been deemed "Champion Cup", and in all subsequent years as "Champions".)	Runner-up
1998 Apertura	Alianza F.C.	L.A. Firpo
1999 Clausura	L.A. Firpo	C.D. FAS
1999 Apertura	C.D. Águila	C.D. Municipal Limeño
2000 Clausura	L.A. Firpo	ADET
2000 Apertura	C.D. Águila	C.D. Municipal Limeño
2001 Clausura	C.D. Águila	C.D. FAS
2001 Apertura	Alianza F.C.	L.A. Firpo
2002 Clausura	C.D. FAS	Alianza F.C.
2002 Apertura	C.D. FAS	San Salvador F.C.
2003 Clausura	San Salvador F.C.	L.A. Firpo
2003 Apertura	C.D. FAS	C.D. Águila
2004 Clausura	Alianza F.C.	C.D. FAS
2004 Apertura	C.D. FAS	C.D. Atlético Balboa
2005 Clausura	C.D. FAS	L.A. Firpo
2005 Apertura	C.D. Vista Hermosa	A.D. Isidro Metapán
2006 Clausura	C.D. Águila	C.D. FAS
2006 Apertura	Once Municipal	C.D. FAS
2007 Clausura	A.D. Isidro Metapán	L.A. Firpo
2007 Apertura	L.A. Firpo	C.D. FAS
2008 Clausura	L.A. Firpo	C.D. FAS
2008 Apertura	A.D. Isidro Metapán	C.D. Chalatenango
2009 Clausura	A.D. Isidro Metapán	L.A. Firpo
2009 Apertura	C.D. FAS	C.D. Águila
2010 Clausura	A.D. Isidro Metapán	C.D. Águila
2010 Apertura	A.D. Isidro Metapán	Alianza F.C.
2011 Clausura	Alianza F.C.	C.D. FAS
2011 Apertura	A.D. Isidro Metapán	Once Municipal
2012 Clausura	C.D. Águila	A.D. Isidro Metapán
2012 Apertura	A.D. Isidro Metapán	Alianza F.C.
2013 Clausura	L.A. Firpo	FAS
2013 Apertura	A.D. Isidro Metapán	FAS
2014 Clausura	A.D. Isidro Metapán	Dragon
2014 Apertura	A.D. Isidro Metapán	Aguila
2015 Clausura	Santa Tecla F.C.	A.D. Isidro Metapán
2015 Apertura	Alianza F.C.	C.D. FAS
2016 Clausura	C.D. Dragon	C.D. Aguila
2016 Apertura	Santa Tecla F.C.	Alianza F.C.
2017 Clausura	Santa Tecla F.C.	Alianza F.C.
2017 Apertura	Alianza F.C.	Santa Tecla F.C.
2018 Clausura	Alianza F.C.	Santa Tecla F.C.
2018 Apertura	Santa Tecla F.C.	Alianza F.C.
2019 Clausura	Aguila	Alianza F.C.
2019 Apertura	Alianza F.C.	C.D. FAS
2020 Clausura	Season Cancelled due to the COVID-19 pandemic. (Note: Once Deportivo were originally given the championship after leading the competition after 11 rounds, but the title was later retracted.)	
2020 Apertura	Alianza F.C.	Aguila
2021 Clausura	FAS	Alianza F.C.
2021 Apertura	Alianza F.C.	Platense
2022 Clausura	Alianza F.C.	Aguila
2022 Apertura	FAS	Jocoro
2023 Clausura	Season was cancelled due to the San Salvador crowd crush.	
2023 Apertura	Aguila	Jocoro
2024 Clausura	Alianza F.C.	Municipal Limeno
2024 Apertura	Once Deportivo	FAS
2025 Clausura	Alianza F.C.	C.D. Municipal Limeño
2025 Apertura	L.A. Firpo	Alianza F.C.
2026 Clausura	FAS	Aguila

== Professional Football locally Salvadoran ==
Name Salvadoran football competition	Copetencia level football	Number of teams in league
Salvadoran Primera División	1ª "A"	12 Football clubs
Segunda División de Fútbol Salvadoreño	2ª "B"	14 Football clubs
Tercera Division de Fútbol Salvadoreño	3ª "C"	34 Football clubs
La Asociación Departamental de Fútbol Aficionado	4ª "D"	50 Football clubs

== Current Board of Directors ==
=== Management ===
As of September 17, 2025

Position	Staff
President	(El Salvador) Samuel Gálvez
Vice-President	(El Salvador) René Ayala
Secretary	(El Salvador) TBD
Pro-Secretary	(El Salvador) TBD
Administrative Manager	(El Salvador) TBD
One senior staff	(El Salvador) TBD
Two managers	(El Salvador) TBD
Third managers	(El Salvador) TBD
Management Representative	(El Salvador) TBD

== See also ==
- Football in El Salvador – overview of football sport
- Copa Presidente - nation wide cup competition
