= Independiente Nacional 1906 =

Association football club in El Salvador

Nacional
- Full name: Independiente Nacional 1906
- Nicknames: Los Fantasmas del Jiboa; Camoteros; Aurinegros
- Founded: 1946
- Ground: Estadio Jiboa, Ciudad de San Vicente, El Salvador
- Capacity: 8,000
- Chairman: (El Salvador) Lic. Josué Palacio
- Manager: (El Salvador) Adonay Ulises Martinez
- League: (El Salvador) Tercera División
- Clausura 2019: 9º (as C.D. Audaz)
Home colours	Away colours

Independiente Nacional 1906 is a Salvadoran professional football club based in San Vicente, El Salvador. They play in the Tercera División, the top tier of El Salvador football league system, El Salvador football. The club was formed in 1946.

== History ==
After a year in the Tercera Division, in January 2016, they decided to buy an invitation category and returned to Segunda Division, where they would reach the tournament of the Apertura Tournament that year when they defeated Turin F.C. getting half a ticket to the Major League, would return to final instances in the 2017 Clausura, but would fall with Audaz both in the final series of the tournament, and in the first defining party

In 2019, for the start of the Tournament 2019 Clausura it was announced that the club's leadership acquires the team's franchise Audaz, which due to economic problems and debts can not continue to hold in the first division, although for reasons of logistics handling in the tournament with the name and distinctive of the apastepecano club

At the end of the 2020 season, Pablo Herrera (owner of the franchise license) announced that Independiente would lose their license and he would be giving the license to Luis Angel Firpo for the Clausura 2020.

After a four-year hiatus, Independiente FC announced on June 15, 2024, they had purchased Estrella Roja and would compete in the 2024-2025 Tercera Division season.

== Honours ==
=== Domestic honours ===
- Primera Division and predecessors
  - Runners up: 1981, 1982
- Segunda División Salvadorean and predecessors
  - Champions: 2016 Apertura

== Players ==
=== Current squad ===
As of: October 1, 2024 Note: Flags indicate national team as defined under FIFA eligibility rules; some limited exceptions apply. Players may hold more than one non-FIFA nationality.

No.	Pos.	Nation	Player
29	MF	ESA	Nery Mejia
—		ESA	Samuel Leon
2		ESA	A Avalos
6		ESA	A Gomez
7		ESA	Aldair Perez
10		ESA	Eduardo Navarro
11	MF	ESA	J Argueta (captain)
16	FW	ESA	David Garcia
17	DF	ESA	Mauricio Garcia
—		ESA	Edwin Sibrian
—		ESA	Kevin Valladares
—		ESA	Axel martinez
—		ESA	Everlio Aguilar
—	GK	ESA	Levi Quintanilla

No.	Pos.	Nation	Player
—		ESA	Derek Rivas
—		ESA	Saul Rivas
—		ESA	Rodrigo Lopez
20		ESA	Fernando Gomez
21	DF	ESA	Steven Arevalo
21		ESA	A Diaz
22	GK	ESA	Aldair Argueta
25	MF	ESA	Enrique Garcia
26		ESA	Oscar Monge
33		ESA	I Martinez
35		ESA	Melvin Maldonado

=== Out on loan ===
Note: Flags indicate national team as defined under FIFA eligibility rules; some limited exceptions apply. Players may hold more than one non-FIFA nationality.

No.	Pos.	Nation	Player
—		ESA	TBD (to TBDy until May 2020)
—		ESA	TBD (to TBDy until May 2020)

=== In ===
Note: Flags indicate national team as defined under FIFA eligibility rules; some limited exceptions apply. Players may hold more than one non-FIFA nationality.

No.	Pos.	Nation	Player
—	DF	ESA	TBD (From TBD)
—	DF	ESA	TBD (From TBD)
—	DF	ESA	TBD (From TBD)

No.	Pos.	Nation	Player
—	DF	ESA	TBD (From TBD)
—	DF	ESA	TBD (From TBD)
—	DF	ESA	TBD (From TBD)

=== Out ===
Note: Flags indicate national team as defined under FIFA eligibility rules; some limited exceptions apply. Players may hold more than one non-FIFA nationality.

No.	Pos.	Nation	Player
—	MF	ESA	TBD (To TBD)
—	MF	ESA	TBD (To TBD)
—	MF	ESA	TBD (To TBD)
—	MF	ESA	TBD (To TBD)

No.	Pos.	Nation	Player
—	MF	ESA	TBD (To TBD)
—	MF	ESA	TBD (To TBD)
—	MF	ESA	TBD (To TBD)
—	MF	ESA	TBD (To TBD)

== Management and support staff ==
=== Coaching staff ===
As of June 2024

Position	Staff
Manager	(El Salvador) Adonai Martínez
Assistant Manager	(El Salvador) TBD
Fitness Coach	(El Salvador) Wilmer Melara
Goalkeeper Coach	(El Salvador) TBD
Under 17 Manager	(El Salvador) TBD
Under 15 Manager	(El Salvador) TBD
Team Doctor	(El Salvador) TBD
Kinesiologist	(El Salvador) TBD
Utility	(El Salvador) TBD

== Records and statistics ==
=== Club records ===
- First victory in the Primera Division for Independiente: 3-2 TBD, 1977
- First goalscorer in the Primera Division for Independiente: TBD v TBD, 1977
- Largest Home victory, Primera División: 4-1 v Chalatenango 2 February 2020
- Largest Away victory, Primera División: 3-0 v Pasaquina, 29 October 2018
- Largest Home loss, Primera División: 1–3 v Chalatenango, 4 November 2018
- Largest Away loss, Primera División: 0-8 v Aguila, October 28, 2007
- Highest home attendance: 2,000 v Primera División, 2018
- Highest away attendance: 1,000 v Primera División, San Salvador, 2018
- Most goals scored, season, Primera División: 55 goals, 1982 Season
- Worst season: Primera Division 1984 & Apertura 2006: 4 wins, 7 draws and 16 losses (15 points) and 4 wins, 3 draws and 11 losses (15 points)

=== Individual records ===
- Record appearances (all competitions): TBD, 822 from 1957 to 1975
- Record appearances (Primera Division): Paraguayan Jorge Caceres, 64 from 2018 to 2019
- Most capped player for El Salvador: 62 (0 whilst at Independiente), Magico Gonzalez
- Most international caps for El Salvador while a Independiente player: 1, TBD
- Most caps won whilst at Independiente: 1, TBD.
- Record scorer in league: TBD, 16
- Most goals in a season (all competitions): TBD, 62 (1927/28) (47 in League, 15 in Cup competitions)
- Most goals in a season (Primera Division): Óscar Gustavo “Lotario” Guerrero, 19 (1982)

=== Top goalscorers ===
No.	Player	period	Goals
1	(El Salvador) Óscar Gustavo “Lotario” Guerrero	1978-1983	19*
2	(Colombia) Tardelis Peña	2019-2020	9
3	(Colombia) Alexander Obregón	2019	8
3	(El Salvador) Mágico González	1977	7
4	(Colombia) Camilo Gomez	2019	4
5	(Argentina) Luciano Sanhueza	2019	4
6	(Nigeria) Fredrick Ogangan	2020	3
7	(El Salvador) Rafael Burgos	2019	2
8	(El Salvador) Jose Maria Rivas	1978–1984	tbd
10	(El Salvador) Fredy González Víchez	2019	6

Note: Players in bold text are still active with Independiente FC

=== Team captains ===
Name	Years
(El Salvador) TBD	TBD
(El Salvador) Francisco Calixto	1977
(El Salvador) Jesus Gonzalez	1978
(El Salvador) Henry Moreno Gato	1978-1979
(El Salvador) Gustavo Guerrero	1983-1984
(El Salvador) Modesto Henriquez	1989
(El Salvador) TBD	TBD
(El Salvador) Erasmo Henriquez	2015-2016

== Coaches ==
Club Deportivo Real Independiente/ Independiente Nacional 1906

- (El Salvador) Carlos Antonio Meléndez (2002- June 2006)
- (El Salvador) Juan Ramon Paredes (July 2006 –Sept 2006)
- (Argentina) Juan Quarterone (Oct 2006 – Mar 2007)
- (Uruguay) Rubén Alonso (April 2007 – Jun 2007)

Independiente de San Vicente

- (El Salvador) Guillermo "Loro" Castro (1978–1980)
- (Chile) Julio del Carmen Escobar Ortiz (1982)
- (El Salvador) Luis Alonso Santana "El Chispo" (1983)
- (El Salvador) Iván Antonio Ruíz Zuñiga (2003–2005)
- Hiatus – Club suspended (2008– 2014)
- (El Salvador) Ricardo Garcia "La Culebra" (2014 – Oct 2015)
- (El Salvador) Nelson Mauricio Ancheta (Feb 2016 -Sep 2016)
- (El Salvador) Willy Mirnda (interim) (Sep 2016 – Oct 2016)
- (Uruguay) Rubén Alonso (Oct 2016 – Aug 2017)
- (El Salvador) Edgar Henríquez (Aug 2017 – Dec 2017)
- (El Salvador) Ivan Ruiz (Dec 2017 -May 2018)
- (El Salvador) Wilson Angulo (July 2018 – Sep 2018)
- (El Salvador) Ivan Ruiz (Sep 2018– Nov 2018)
- (El Salvador) Orlando Hernandez Torres (Nov 2018 – Dec 2019)
- Hiatus – Club suspended (Jan 2019– June 2019)
- (Spain) Juan Cortes Diéguez (July 2019– October 2019)
- (El Salvador) Omar Sevilla (October 2019 – March 2020)
- (El Salvador) William Renderos Iraheta (March 2020- April 2020)
- Hiatus (April 2020– June 2024)
- (El Salvador) Adonay Martinez (June 2024- December 2024)
- Hiatus (January 2025 - Present)
