= List of C.D. Luis Ángel Firpo managers =

C.D. Luis Angel Firpo has had many coaches in its history.

The majority of coaches Firpo have had have been Salvadorians. Of the coaches to have managed Firpo, 14 have been Spaniards and 17 foreigners. In some cases, the Spanish coaches have been former players of the club that agreed to take charge after the sacking of the regular coach that season.

The main nationalities of the coaches of Firpo barring Salvadorians have been Argentina (7 coaches), Chilean (3) and Yugoslavian (2). The club has also had two Uruguayan coaches, a Brazilians, a Paraguayan, and a Peruvian.

== Firpo's coaches ==
Information correct as of match played June 6, 2025. Only competitive matches are counted.

Name	Nationality	From	To	Honours
Juan Antonio Merlos	El Salvador	TBD	TBD	
Raúl Magaña	El Salvador	other tenure TBD	TBD	
Manuel Segurado ("El Zancudo")	El Salvador	1938	1940s	
Luis Antonio Regalado	El Salvador	1950s	1950s	
Narciso Romagoza	El Salvador	1959	1960	1 (Segunda División Salvadorean)
Luis Antonio Regalado	El Salvador	1960	1961	
Fermín Águila	El Salvador	1961	1962	
Ramón Rodríguez Soto	Costa Rica	1962	1962	Player-coach/First foreign coach
Victor Manuel Ochoa	El Salvador	1968	1968	
Luis Antonio Regalado	El Salvador	1971	1971	
Luis Alonso Santana ("El Chispo")	El Salvador	1972	July 1973	
Marcelo Estrada	Argentina	July 1973	1973	
Jorge Tupinambá	Brazil	February 1974	April 1974	
Marcelo Estrada	Argentina	May 1974	November 1974	
Fermín Águila	El Salvador	December 1974	December 1974	
Jorge Venegas	Chile	January 1975	July 1975	
Raúl Magaña (Araña)	El Salvador	July 1975	1975	
Luis Alonso Santana ("El Chispo")	El Salvador	1976	1977	
René Mena (Pando)	El Salvador	1979	1980	
Óscar Ovidio Méndez	El Salvador	1985	1985	
Julio Escobar	Chile	1987	1987	
Hugo Luis Lencina	Argentina	1987	1988	
Juan Quarterone	Argentina	1988	1988	
Julio Escobar	Chile	1988	1989	1988/1989 Primera Division (Champion)
Juan Masnik	Uruguay	1990	1991	1990/1991 Primera Division (Champion)
Kiril Dojčinovski	(North Macedonia) Macedonia	1991, 1993	1992, 1994	1991/1992 Primera Division (Champion), 1992/1993 Primera Division (Champion)
Hernán Carrasco Vivanco	Chile	1992	1993	
Julio Escobar	Chile	1994	1995	
Victor Pacheco & Lorenzo Marroquin	El Salvador	1995	October 1995	
Carlos Antonio Meléndez (Interim)	El Salvador	1995	1995	
Kiril Dojčinovski	(North Macedonia) Macedonia	1995	1996	
Mario Pérez	Mexico	August 1996	November 1996	
Kiril Dojčinovski	(North Macedonia) Macedonia	November 1996	December 1996	
Juan Lopez	Uruguay	January 1997	January 1997	
Jorge Aude	Uruguay	January 1997	February 1997	
Julio Escobar	Chile	February 1997	January 2000	1997/1998 Primera Division (champion) and Clausura 1999 (Champion)
Nelson Brizuela	Paraguay	January 2000	April 2000	
Julio Escobar	Chile	May 2000	April 2001	Clausura 2000 (Champion)
Miloš Miljanić	Serbia	May 2001	June 2003	
Gustavo de Simone	Uruguay	June 2003	November 2004	
Saúl Rivero	Uruguay	December 2004	April 2005	
Leonel Cárcamo	El Salvador	April 2005	December 2005	
Miloš Miljanić	Serbia	January 2006	July 2006	
Leonel Cárcamo	El Salvador	August 2006	March 2007	
Hugo Coria	Argentina	March 2007	June 2007	
Horacio Cordero	Argentina	July 2007	November 2007	Apertura 2007 Primera Division (Champion)
Gerardo Reinoso	Argentina	Jan 2008	May 2008	Clausura 2008 Primera Division (Champion)
Miguel Aguilar Obando	El Salvador	May 2008	August 2008	
Oscar Emigdio Benítez	El Salvador	September 2008	November 2008	
Agustín Castillo	Peru	December 2008	December 2009	
Hugo Coria	Argentina	December 2009	December 2010	
Ramiro Cepeda	Argentina	December 2010	May 2011	
Nelson Ancheta	El Salvador	May 2011	May 2012	
Edgar "Kiko" Henriquez	El Salvador	June 2012	March 2013	
Roberto Gamarra	Argentina	March 2013	September 2013	Primera Division Clausura 2013 (Champion)
Ramiro Cepeda	Argentina	September 2013	March 2014	
Leonel Cárcamo	El Salvador	March 2014	May 2014	
Nelson Ancheta	El Salvador	May 2014	April 2015	
Alvaro Misael Alfaro	El Salvador	April 2015	March 2016	
José Mario Martínez	El Salvador	March 2016	September 2016	
Juan Ramón Sánchez	El Salvador	September 2016	October 2017	
Eraldo Correia	Brazil	October 2017	February 2018	
Victor Giron/ José Francisco Jovel (Interim)	El Salvador	February 2018	March 2018	
Giovanni Trigueros	El Salvador	March 2018	May 2018	
Jorge Calles	El Salvador	May 2018	October 2018	
Asdurbal Flores	El Salvador	October 2018	February 2019	
Carlos Alberto de Toro	Argentina	February 2019	June 2019	
Hiatus – Club suspended	El Salvador	June 2019	April 2020	
William Renderos Iraheta	El Salvador	April 2020	November 2020	
Roberto Gamarra	Argentina	November 2020	February 2022	
Eraldo Correia	Brazil	February 2022	June 2022	
Carlos Romero	El Salvador	June, 2022	December, 2022	
Guillermo Rivera	El Salvador	December 2022	December 2023	
Gabriel Alvarez	Argentina	January 2024	May 2025	
Marvin Solano Abarca	Costa Rica	June 2025	Present	2025 Apertura (Champion)
