= 1991–92 Primera División de Fútbol Profesional =

Primera División de Fútbol Profesional
- Season: 1991–92
- Champions: LA Firpo (3rd Title)
- Relegated: Metapan

The 1991–92 Primera División de Fútbol Professional season, also known as the Copa Taca, was the 41st edition of El Salvador's Primera División since the establishment of the national league system in 1948. The tournament began on the September 1, 1991 and ended on the July 6, 1992. Luis Angel Firpo, the best-regular season team, won the championship match against Alianza.

== Teams ==
Team	City	Stadium	Head coach	Captain
Acajutla/Tiburones	TBD	Estadio	(El Salvador) Conrado Miranda	(El Salvador)
ADET	TBD	Estadio	(El Salvador) Victor Manuel Pacheco	(El Salvador) Sergio Valenica
Atletico Marte	TBD	Estadio Cuscutlan	(Uruguay) Mario Figueroa	(El Salvador) Santana Cartagena
Aguila	TBD	Estadio	(El Salvador) TBD	(Argentina) Hugo Coria
Alianza	TBD	Estadio	(El Salvador) TBD	(El Salvador)
Cojutepeque	TBD	Estadio	(Argentina) Hector Raul Cocherari	(El Salvador)
FAS	TBD	Estadio	(Argentina) Juan Carlos Montes	(El Salvador)
Firpo	TBD	Estadio	(Socialist Federal Republic of Yugoslavia) Kiril Dojčinovski	(El Salvador)
Fuerte San Francisco	TBD	Estadio	(El Salvador) TBD	(El Salvador)
Metapan	TBD	Estadio	(El Salvador) TBD	(El Salvador)

== Managerial changes ==
=== Before the season ===
Team	Outgoing manager	Manner of departure	Date of vacancy	Replaced by	Date of appointment	Position in table
LA Firpo	(Uruguay) Juan Masnik	Resigned	1991	(Socialist Federal Republic of Yugoslavia) Kiril Dojčinovski	1991	

=== During the season ===
Team	Outgoing manager	Manner of departure	Date of vacancy	Replaced by	Date of appointment	Position in table
TBD	(El Salvador) TBD	Sacked	1989	(El Salvador)	1990	
TBD	(El Salvador) TBD	Sacked	1989	(El Salvador)	1990	

== Final ==
July 6, 1992

LA Firpo	3-0	Alianza
Fernando De Moura 74'; Nildelson De Mello 77' 84'	[ ]	Nil

Estadio Cuscatlán, San Salvador

Luis Angel Firpo:
GK	TBD	(El Salvador) Carlos Rivera
DF	TBD	(El Salvador) Leonel Carcamo
DF	TBD	(El Salvador) Miguel Estrada
DF	TBD	(El Salvador) Giovanni Trigueros
DF	TBD	(El Salvador) Nelson Portillo
MF	TBD	(El Salvador) Fernando Lazo
MF	TBD	(El Salvador) Marlon Menjivar
MF	TBD	(El Salvador) Pedro Vasquez
FW	TBD	(El Salvador) Edgar Henriquez
FW	TBD	(Brazil) Fernando De Moura
FW	TBD	(Brazil) Nildelson De Mello
Substitutes:
MF	TBD	(Chile) Raul Toro
Manager:
(Socialist Federal Republic of Yugoslavia) Kiril Dojčinovski

Alianza:
GK	TBD	(El Salvador) William Noé Rosales Santillana
DF	TBD	(El Salvador) Nelson Rojas
DF	TBD	(El Salvador) Mario Mayén Meza
DF	TBD	(El Salvador) Joaquín Salazar
DF	TBD	(El Salvador) William Enrique Chachagua
MF	TBD	(El Salvador) Juan Ramón Pacheco
MF	TBD	(El Salvador) Rodriguez
MF	TBD	(El Salvador) Milton Melendez
MF	TBD	(El Salvador) Julio Amilcar Palacios
FW	TBD	(Costa Rica) Eduardo Ramírez
FW	TBD	(El Salvador) Joaquín Canales
Substitutes:
DF	3	(Uruguay) Julio César Pereira
Manager:
(El Salvador) Armando Contreras

== Top scorers ==
Pos	Player	Team	Goals
1.	(Argentina) Hugo Coria	Aguila	22
2	(El Salvador) TBD	TBD	TBD
3.	(El Salvador) TBD	TBD	TBD
4.	(Argentina) Jose Luis Cardenas	FAS	12
5.	(Argentina) TBD	TBD	TBD
6.	(El Salvador) TBD	TBD	TBD
7.	(El Salvador) TBD	TBD	TBD
8.	(El Salvador) TBD	TBD	TBD
9.	(El Salvador) TBD	TBD	TBD
10.	(El Salvador) TBD	TBD	TBD

== List of foreign players in the league ==
This is a list of foreign players in 1991-1992. The following players:

1. have played at least one game for the respective club.
2. have not been capped for the El Salvador national football team on any level, independently from the birthplace

Acajutla

- (Peru)

ADET

- (Honduras) Julio César Arzú
- (Honduras) Anthony Matthews Bailey
- (Honduras) Gilberto Yearwood

C.D. Águila

- (Argentina) Hugo Coria
- (Brazil) Salvador Filho
- (Uruguay) Daniel Darío López

Alianza F.C.

- (Costa Rica) Eduardo "Tanque" Ramírez
- (Chile) Carlos Solar
- (Chile) Raul Toro
- (Uruguay) Gustavo Faral
- (Uruguay) Julio da Rosa

Atletico Marte

- (Colombia) Herny Vélez de la Torre
- (Honduras) Pastor Martínez
- (Peru) Agustin Castillo
- (Uruguay) José Luis Cardozo

(player released mid season) (player Injured mid season) Injury replacement player

Cojutepeque

- (Honduras)

C.D. FAS

- (Argentina) Fulgencio Deonel Bordon
- (Uruguay) Hector "El Indio" Molina
- (Uruguay) Luis "El Flaco" Heimen
- (Uruguay) Gustavo "El Gaucho" Lucas

C.D. Luis Ángel Firpo

- (Brazil) Toninho Dos Santos
- (Brazil) Nildeson
- (Brazil) Fernando de Moura
- (Paraguay) Julio César Chávez

Fuerte San Francisco

- (Uruguay) Ruben Alonso
- (Uruguay) Gustavo Faral

Metapan

- (Honduras)
