= Primera División de Fútbol Profesional Clausura 2002 =

Primera División de Fútbol de El Salvador
- Champions: C.D. FAS (12th title)
- Relegated: Atletico Marte
- Top goalscorer: TBD (12)

The Primera División de Fútbol Profesional Clausura 2002 season (officially "Torneo Clausura 2002") started on January 20, 2002.

The season was composed of the following clubs:

- C.D. FAS
- C.D. Municipal Limeño
- San Salvador F.C.
- C.D. Águila
- C.D. Luis Ángel Firpo
- Atlético Marte
- C.D. Atlético Balboa
- Alianza F.C.
- A.D. Isidro Metapán
- C.D. Dragón

== Team information ==
=== Personnel and sponsoring ===
Team	Chairman	Head coach	Kitmaker	Shirt sponsor
Águila	(El Salvador)	(El Salvador) Ruben Guevara	TBD	TBD
Alianza	(El Salvador) Óscar Rodríguez	(El Salvador) Juan Ramón Paredes	TBD	TBD
Atletico Balboa	(El Salvador) TBD	(Argentina) Juan Quarterone	TBD	TBD
Atlético Marte	(El Salvador) TBD	(El Salvador) Luis Angel Leon	TBD	TBD
C.D. Dragon	(El Salvador) TBD	(Paraguay) Nelson Brizuela	TBD	TBD
FAS	(El Salvador) Reynaldo Valle	(Peru) Agustín Castillo	TBD	TBD
Firpo	(El Salvador) TBD	(North Macedonia) Kiril Dojčinovski	TBD	TBD
Isidro Metapan	(El Salvador) José Gumercindo Landaverde	(Argentina) Roberto Fabrizio	TBD	TBD
Municipal Limeno	(El Salvador) TBD	(El Salvador) Oscar Benítez	TBD	TBD
San Salvador F.C.	(El Salvador) Marco Flores	(El Salvador) Jaime Rodriguez	TBD	TBD

== Notable events ==
=== Notable death during the Clausura 2002 season ===
The following people associated with the Primera Division have died between the Start of 2002 and Middle of 2002.

- Marcelo Estrada (ex coach of LA Firpo, Alianza, Quequeisque, Anita UES and Atlante) Falleció Marcelo Estrada

== Managerial changes ==
=== Before the season ===
Team	Outgoing manager	Manner of departure	Date of vacancy	Replaced by	Date of appointment	Position in table
Águila	(Uruguay) Saul Lorenzo Rivero	Resigned	2002	(El Salvador) Rubén Guevara	2002	
Atletico Balboa	(El Salvador) Saul Molina	TBD	2002	(Argentina) Juan Quarterone	2002	
Municipal Limeño	(North Macedonia) Kiril Dojčinovski	TBD	2002	(El Salvador) Oscar Emigdio Benitez	2002	
Firpo	(Federal Republic of Yugoslavia) Miloš Miljanić	TBD	2002	(North Macedonia) Kiril Dojčinovski	2002	
Dragón	(Ecuador) Alfredo Encalada	TBD	2002	(Paraguay) Nelson Brizuela	2002	
Atletico Marte	(El Salvador) Mauricio Pachin Gonzales	TBD	2002	(El Salvador) Luis Angel Leon	2002	
Isidro Metapan	(El Salvador) José Calazán	TBD	2002	(Argentina) Roberto Fabrizio	2002	

=== During the season ===
Team	Outgoing manager	Manner of departure	Date of vacancy	Replaced by	Date of appointment	Position in table
Atletico Marte	(El Salvador) Luis Angel Leon	TBD	Feb 2002	(Chile) Hernan Carrasco	March 2002	
San Salvador F.C.	(El Salvador) Jaime Rodriguez	TBD	March 2002	(Uruguay) Ruben Alonso	March 2002	
Firpo	(North Macedonia) Kiril Dojčinovski	TBD	March 2002	(El Salvador) Abraham Vasquez	March 2002	

== Standings ==
Pos	Team	Pld	W	D	L	GF	GA	GD	Pts	Qualification or relegation
1	C.D. Águila	18	11	5	2	47	20	+27	38	
2	Alianza F.C.	18	9	3	6	38	24	+14	30	
3	C.D. Municipal Limeño	18	8	6	4	24	16	+8	30	
4	A.D. Isidro Metapán	18	8	5	5	30	16	+14	29	Playoff
5	C.D. FAS	18	7	8	3	29	18	+11	29	Playoff
6	C.D. Luis Ángel Firpo	18	8	5	5	22	22	0	29	
7	C.D. Atlético Balboa	18	5	7	6	19	24	−5	22	
8	San Salvador F.C. (Note: AD El Tránsito (ADET) were renamed San Salvador FC)	18	3	5	10	23	37	−14	14	
9	C.D. Dragón	18	3	3	12	22	44	−22	12	
10	Atlético Marte	18	2	5	11	13	45	−32	8 (Note: Marte had 3 points deducted for having 5 players sent off in round 5)	Relegated to Segunda División de Fútbol Salvadoreño

== Semifinals 1st leg ==
May 12, 2002

C.D. Municipal Limeño	0-1	Alianza F.C.

May 12, 2002

C.D. FAS	2-1	C.D. Águila

== Semifinals 2nd leg ==
May 18, 2002

C.D. Águila	4-4	C.D. FAS

May 18, 2002

Alianza F.C.	0-0	C.D. Municipal Limeño

== Final ==
26 May 2002

C.D. FAS	4-0	Alianza F.C.
Williams Reyes 24' & 28' (pen.); Víctor Velásquez 42'; Alejandro Bentos 55'

Estadio Cuscatlán

FAS:
GK	TBA	(El Salvador) Luis Castro
DF	TBA	(El Salvador) William Osorio
DF	TBA	(El Salvador) Daniel Sagastizado
DF	TBA	(El Salvador) Marvin González
DF	TBA	(El Salvador) Víctor Velásquez
MF	TBA	(El Salvador) Nelson Nerio
MF	TBA	(El Salvador) Ernesto Góchez
MF	TBA	(Colombia) Víctor Mafla	(substituted off) 28'
MF	TBA	(El Salvador) Gilberto Murgas
FW	TBA	(Argentina) Alejandro Bentos	(substituted off) 77'
FW	TBA	(Honduras) Williams Reyes	(substituted off) 73'
Substitutes:
MF	TBA	(El Salvador) Cristian Álvarez	(substituted on) 28'
FW	TBA	(Brazil) Nildeson	(substituted on) 73'
FW	TBA	(El Salvador) Juan Carlos López	(substituted on) 77'
Manager:
(Peru) Agustín Castillo

Alianza:
GK	TBA	(El Salvador) Miguel Montes (yellow card)
DF	TBA	(El Salvador) (Argentina) Adrián De La Cruz (yellow card)
DF	TBA	(El Salvador) Alexander Merino (red card)
DF	TBA	(El Salvador) Mario Elias Guevara
DF	TBA	(El Salvador) Ramiro Carballo (yellow card)
MF	TBA	(Colombia) Diego Pizarro	(substituted off) 53'
MF	TBA	(Colombia) Jorge Sandoval
MF	TBA	(El Salvador) Óscar Navarro
MF	TBA	(El Salvador) Juan Carlos Serrano	(substituted off) 63'
FW	TBA	(Colombia) Martín García	(substituted off) 73'
FW	TBA	(El Salvador) Adonai Martínez
Substitutes:
FW	TBA	(El Salvador) Miguel Riquelmi	(substituted on) 53'
MF	TBA	(Colombia) Jahir Muñoz	(substituted on) 63'
MF	TBA	(El Salvador) Amílcar Ramírez	(substituted on) 77'
Manager:
(El Salvador) Juan Ramón Paredes

Clasura Champions 2002
C.D. FAS
12 title

== List of foreign players in the league ==
This is a list of foreign players in Clausura 2002. The following players:

1. have played at least one apertura game for the respective club.
2. have not been capped for the El Salvador national football team on any level, independently from the birthplace

C.D. Águila

- (Argentina) Mariano Villegas
- (Argentina) Emiliano Pedrozo
- (Brazil) Alexander Prediguer
- (Brazil) Mauro Núñez
- (Brazil) Rodinei Martins

Alianza F.C.

- (Colombia) Jair Muñoz
- (Colombia) Diego Pizarro
- (Colombia) Jorge Sandoval
- (Colombia) Martin Garcia

Atletico Balboa

- (Honduras) Franklin Webster
- (Honduras) Ernesto Aquino
- (Honduras) Camilo Bonilla
- (Peru) Jair Camero

Atletico Marte

- (Argentina) Andres Puig
- (Argentina) Pablo Leguizamo
- (Chile) Raúl Toro
- (Mexico) Ricardo Bellacalzone
- (Trinidad and Tobago) Vladimir Suite

Dragon

- (Colombia) Andrés Molina
- (Colombia) Luis Marines
- (Venezuela) Luis Iseles
- (Colombia) Juan Carlos Mosquera

(player released mid season) (player Injured mid season) Injury replacement player

C.D. FAS

- (Argentina) Ariel Giles
- (Argentina) Alejandro Bentos
- (Honduras) Williams Reyes
- (Colombia) Victor Mafla
- (Colombia) Carlos Rendón

C.D. Luis Ángel Firpo

- (Argentina) Diego Rafael Álvarez
- (Brazil) Mauricio Dos Santos
- (Panama) Victor Herrera Piggott
- (Uruguay) Wáshington Hernández

A.D. Isidro Metapán

- (Argentina) Juan Fullana
- (Argentina) Diego Oyarbide
- (Colombia) Luis Carlos Asprilla
- (Brazil) Anderson Batista
- (Brazil) Alessandro Rodríguez
- (Honduras) Jorge Wagner

Municipal Limeno

- (Honduras) Luis Alfredo Ramírez
- (Honduras) Gustavo Adolfo Gallegos
- (Argentina) Gustavo Mhamed
- (Ecuador) Fausto Klinger
- (Costa Rica) Luis Martínez
- (Uruguay) Víctor Avelenda

San Salvador F.C.

- (Argentina) Rodrigo Lagos
- (Brazil) Paulo César Rodríguez
- (Colombia) Alexander Obregón
- (Colombia) Orlando Garces
- (Peru) Jaime Farfan
- (Honduras) German Rodríguez
- (Costa Rica) Carlos Rodríguez
