= 1990–91 Primera División de Fútbol Profesional =

Primera División de Fútbol Profesional
- Season: 1990–91
- Champions: LA Firpo (2nd Title)
- Relegated: Dragon

The 1990–91 Primera División de Fútbol Profesional season is the 40th tournament of El Salvador's Primera División since its establishment of the National League system in 1948. The tournament began August 12, 1990 and ended on June 30, 1991. Luis Angel Firpo won the championship match against Aguila 1-0.

Luis Angel Firpo went 31 games undefeated, the second longest undefeated run at the time. Since that time, Alianza and FAS 33 games in 1977-78 games.

== Teams ==
| Team | City | Stadium | Head coach | Captain |
|---|---|---|---|---|
| Acajutla | TBD | Estadio | (El Salvador) TBD | (El Salvador) |
| Atletico Marte | TBD | Estadio Cuscutlan | (El Salvador) | (El Salvador) |
| Aguila | TBD | Estadio | (Chile) Nestor Matamala | (El Salvador) |
| Alianza | TBD | Estadio | (El Salvador) TBD | (El Salvador) |
| Cojutepeque | TBD | Estadio | (El Salvador) TBD | (El Salvador) Hugo Ventura |
| Dragon | TBD | Estadio | (El Salvador) TBD | (El Salvador) |
| FAS | TBD | Estadio | (Costa Rica) Marvin Rodriguez | (El Salvador) |
| Firpo | TBD | Estadio | (Uruguay) Juan Masnik | (El Salvador) |
| Fuerte San Francisco | TBD | Estadio | (El Salvador) TBD | (El Salvador) |
| Metapan | TBD | Estadio | (El Salvador) TBD | (El Salvador) |

== Managerial changes ==
=== During the season ===
| Team | Outgoing manager | Manner of departure | Date of vacancy | Replaced by | Date of appointment | Position in table |
|---|---|---|---|---|---|---|
| TBD | (El Salvador) TBD | Sacked | 1989 | (El Salvador) | 1990 | |
| TBD | (El Salvador) TBD | Sacked | 1989 | (El Salvador) | 1990 | |

== Notable events ==
=== Team name change ===
Prior to the start of 1990-91 season, Acajutla changed their names to Tiburones FC (the sharks). They also changed their team colour from red to white and orange.

== Final ==
30 June 1991

| LA Firpo | 1-0 | C.D. Aguila |
|---|---|---|
| Marlon Menjívar 69' | [ ] | Nil |

Estadio Cuscatlán, San Salvador

Luis Angel Firpo:
| GK | TBD | (El Salvador) Carlos Rivera |
| DF | TBD | (El Salvador) Leonel Carcamo |
| DF | TBD | (El Salvador) Miguel Estrada |
| DF | TBD | (El Salvador) Giovanni Trigueros |
| DF | TBD | (El Salvador) Nelson Portillo |
| MF | TBD | (El Salvador) Juan Agustin Gamez |
| MF | TBD | (Uruguay) Luis Enrique Guelmo |
| MF | TBD | (El Salvador) Mauricio Cienfuegos |
| MF | TBD | (El Salvador) Marlon Menjivar |
| FW | TBD | (Brazil) Fernando De Moura |
| MF | TBD | (Uruguay) Washington Olivera |
Substitutes:
| MF | TBD | (El Salvador) TBD |
Manager:
(Uruguay) Juan Masnik

Aguila:
| GK | TBD | (El Salvador) Raul Garcia |
| DF | TBD | (El Salvador) Dagoberto López Medrano |
| DF | TBD | (Brazil) Francisco Salvador Filho |
| DF | TBD | (El Salvador) Hector Rosales |
| DF | TBD | (El Salvador) Jorge Morán Mojica |
| MF | TBD | (El Salvador) Alfredo Vasquez |
| MF | TBD | (El Salvador) Ramon Ponce |
| MF | TBD | (Honduras) Ramon Maradiaga |
| FW | TBD | (El Salvador) Luis Ramírez Zapata |
| FW | TBD | (Argentina) Hugo Coria |
| FW | TBD | (El Salvador) Salvador Coreas |
Substitutes:
| DF | 3 | (Argentina) Ruben Salas |
Manager:
(Chile) Néstor Matamala

== Top scorers ==
| Pos | Player | Team | Goals |
|---|---|---|---|
| 1. | (El Salvador) Raul Diaz Arce | Dragon | 21 |
| 2 | (El Salvador) TBD | TBD | TBD |
| 3. | (El Salvador) TBD | TBD | TBD |
| 4. | (El Salvador) TBD | TBD | TBD |
| 5. | (El Salvador) TBD | TBD | TBD |
| 6. | (El Salvador) TBD | TBD | TBD |
| 7. | (El Salvador) Edgar Henriquez | LA Firpo | 12 |
| 8. | (Brazil) Toninho dos Santos | LA Firpo | 11 |
| 9. | (Brazil) Fernando de Moura | LA Firpo | 11 |
| 10. | (El Salvador) TBD | TBD | TBD |

== List of foreign players in the league ==
This is a list of foreign players in 1990-1991. The following players:

1. have played at least one game for the respective club.
2. have not been capped for the El Salvador national football team on any level, independently from the birthplace

C.D. Águila

- (Argentina) Hugo Coria
- (Brazil) Salvador Filho

Alianza F.C.

- (Costa Rica) Eduardo "Tanque" Ramírez
- (Chile) Carlos Solar
- (Chile) Raul Toro
- (Uruguay) Gustavo Faral
- (Uruguay) Julio da Rosa

Atletico Marte

- (Peru) Agustin Castillo
- (Peru) Miguel Seminario

Cojutepeque

- (Panama) Carlos Maldonado
- (Panama) Pércival Piggott
- (Paraguay) Julio Cesar Chavez

Dragon

- (Honduras) Cipriano Dueñas
- (Honduras) Rafael Argueta
- (Uruguay) Gustavo Faral

(player released mid season) (player Injured mid season) Injury replacement player

C.D. FAS

- (Panama) Erick Ortega
- (Uruguay) Daniel Darío López
- (Uruguay) Daniel Uberti

C.D. Luis Ángel Firpo

- (Brazil) Toninho Dos Santos
- (Brazil) Nildeson
- (Brazil) Fernando de Moura
- (Paraguay) Julio César Chávez
- (Uruguay) Luis Guelmo

Fuerte San Francisco

- (Honduras) Jorge Tim Martìnez

Metapan

- (Honduras)

Tiburones

- (Brazil) Vanderley Ataliba
