= 1989–90 Primera División de Fútbol Profesional =

Primera División de El Salvador
- Season: 1989–90
- Champions: Alianza (th Title)
- Relegated: Chalatenango

The 1989–90 Primera División de El Salvador is the 39th tournament of El Salvador's Primera División since its establishment of the National League system in 1948. The tournament was scheduled to end in April 1990. Alianza FC, the best regular season team, won the championship match against Luis Angel Firpo, the best team in the final group.

== Teams ==
Team	City	Stadium	Head coach	Captain
Acajutla F.C.	TBD	Estadio	(El Salvador) TBD	(El Salvador)
Atletico Marte	TBD	Estadio Cuscutlan	(El Salvador)	(El Salvador)
Aguila	TBD	Estadio	(El Salvador) TBD	(El Salvador) Luis Ramírez Zapata
Alianza	TBD	Estadio	(El Salvador) TBD	(El Salvador)
Chalatenango	TBD	Estadio	(El Salvador) TBD	(El Salvador)
Cojutepeque	TBD	Estadio	(El Salvador) TBD	(El Salvador) Hugo Ventura
Dragon	TBD	Estadio	(El Salvador) TBD	(El Salvador)
FAS	TBD	Estadio	(El Salvador) TBD	(El Salvador)
Firpo	TBD	Estadio	(El Salvador) TBD	(El Salvador) Arnoldo Quintanilla
Metapan	TBD	Estadio	(El Salvador) TBD	(El Salvador) Antonio García Prieto

== Managerial changes ==
=== During the season ===
Team	Outgoing manager	Manner of departure	Date of vacancy	Replaced by	Date of appointment	Position in table
TBD	(El Salvador) TBD	Sacked	1989	(El Salvador)	1990	
TBD	(El Salvador) TBD	Sacked	1989	(El Salvador)	1990	

== Notable events ==
=== Notable death from 1989 season and 1990 season ===
The following people associated with the Primera Division have died between the middle of 1989 and middle of 1990.

- Jose Santacolomba (Argentinian, ex Atletico Marte coach)

== League standings ==
Pos	Team	Pld	W	D	L	GF	GA	GD	Pts	Qualification or relegation
1	Alianza F.C.	36	18	12	6	58	33	+25	48	Qualified to finals. Won the right to play a Championship Game if they fail to win the final round.
2	C.D. Luis Ángel Firpo	36	15	15	6	54	31	+23	45	Qualified to finals.
3	Atlético Marte	36	14	14	8	48	37	+11	42	Qualified to finals.
4	Cojutepeque	36	14	13	9	52	43	+9	41	Qualified to finals.
5	Metapán	36	9	22	5	34	35	−1	40	
6	Acajutla	36	13	13	10	42	37	+5	39	
7	C.D. Águila	36	9	13	14	46	52	−6	31	
8	C.D. FAS	36	8	14	14	30	44	−14	30	
9	C.D. Dragon	36	8	13	15	42	50	−8	29	
10	C.D. Chalatenango	36	3	9	24	18	62	−44	15	Relegated to Segunda Division.

Source: https://www.rsssf.org/tablese/elsalhist.html

== Final round standings ==
Pos	Team	Pld	W	D	L	GF	GA	GD	Pts	Qualification
1	C.D. Luis Angel Firpo	6	3	3	0	10	5	+5	9	Qualified to championship game
2	Alianza F.C.	6	3	2	1	11	6	+5	8	
3	Atletico Marte	6	2	2	2	12	10	+2	6	
4	Cojutepeque F.C.	6	0	1	5	5	17	−12	1	

Source: https://www.rsssf.org/tablese/elsalhist.html

== Final ==
23 April 1990

Alianza F.C.	3-1	C.D. Luis Angel Firpo
Raul Toro 10'; Jaime Rodriguez 55'; Joaquín Kin Canales 79'	[ ]	Mauricio Cienfuegos 49'

Estadio Cuscatlán, San Salvador
Referee: Jose Alejandro Ramirez

Alianza FC:
GK	1	(El Salvador) William Rosales Santillana
DF	5	(El Salvador) Carlos Medrano
DF	20	(El Salvador) Jaime Rodriguez
DF	4	(Uruguay) Gustavo Faral
DF	15	(El Salvador) Hector Lopez
MF	18	(El Salvador) Jose Joaquin Salazar
MF	23	(El Salvador) Mario Mayén Meza
MF	21	(El Salvador) Juan Ramon Pacheco
FW	8	(Chile) Raul Toro
FW	16	(El Salvador) Julio Palacios Lozano
FW	10	(El Salvador) Joaquin Canales Escobar
Substitutes:
DF	3	(El Salvador) Rodolfo Barrientos
FW	13	(El Salvador) Luis López Corcio
Manager:
(Chile) Hernan Carasco Vivacano

Luis Angel Firpo:
GK	1	(El Salvador) Carlos Rivera
DF	2	(El Salvador) Arnoldo Quintanilla (c)
DF	3	(El Salvador) Julio Cesar Chavez
DF	18	(El Salvador) Leonel Carcamo
DF	4	(El Salvador) Miguel Estrada
MF	12	(El Salvador) Mauricio Cienfuegos
MF	17	(El Salvador) Giovanni Trigueros
MF	14	(El Salvador) Juan Agustin Gamez
MF	8	(Brazil) Fernando De Moura
FW	10	(Brazil) Toninho Dos Santos
FW	22	(Brazil) Nildeson
Substitutes:
MF	21	(El Salvador) Abraham Vasquez
MF	21	(El Salvador) Manuel Ayala
Manager:
(Chile) Julio Escobar

=== Scoring ===
- First goal of the season: (El Salvador) TBD goal for TBD against TBD (Month day, Year)
- First goal by a foreign player: (El Salvador) TBD goal for TBD against TBD (Month day, Year)
- Fastest goal in a match: 5 Minutes
  - (El Salvador) TBD goal for TBD against TBD (Month day, Year)
- Goal scored at the latest goal in a match: 94 minutes
  - (El Salvador) TBD goal for TBD against TBD (Month day, Year)
- First penalty Kick of the season: (El Salvador) TBD goal for TBD against TBD (Month day, Year)
- Widest winning margin: 4 goals
  - TBD 5–1 TBD (August 20, 2023)
- First hat-trick of the season: (El Salvador) TBD goal for TBD against TBD (Month day, Year)
- First own goal of the season: (El Salvador) TBD (TBD) for TBD] (Month day, Year)
- Most goals in a match: 7 goals
  - TBD 5-3 TBD (Month day, Year)
- Most goals by one team in a match: 5 goals
  - TBD 5-3 TBD (Month day, Year)
- Most goals in one half by one team: 4 goals
  - TBD 5-0 (5-3) TBD (1st half, Month day, year)
- Most goals scored by losing team: 3 goals
  - TBD 3-4 TBD (Month Date, Year)
- Most goals by one player in a single match: 4 goals
  - (Chile) Raul Toro for Alianza against FAS (October 29, 1989)
- Players that scored a hat-trick':
  - (Chile) Raul Toro for Alianza against FAS (October 29, 1989)

== Top scorers ==
Pos	Player	Team	Goals
1.	(Brazil) Toninho dos Santos	LA Firpo	25
2	(Uruguay) Jose Mario Figueroa	Atletico Marte	15
3.	(El Salvador) TBD	TBD	TBD
4.	(El Salvador) TBD	TBD	TBD
5.	(El Salvador) TBD	TBD	TBD
6.	(El Salvador) TBD	TBD	TBD
7.	(El Salvador) TBD	TBD	TBD
8.	(El Salvador) TBD	TBD	TBD
9.	(El Salvador) TBD	TBD	TBD
10.	(El Salvador) TBD	TBD	TBD

== List of foreign players in the league ==
This is a list of foreign players in 1989-1990. The following players:

1. have played at least one apertura game for the respective club.
2. have not been capped for the El Salvador national football team on any level, independently from the birthplace

Acajutla

- (Peru)

C.D. Águila

- (Argentina) Hugo Coria
- (Argentina) Rubén Salas
- (Argentina) Ricardo Santos
- (Argentina) Fabian Zucchini

Alianza F.C.

- (Chile) Carlos Solar
- (Chile) Raul Toro
- (Uruguay) Gustavo Faral
- (Uruguay) Julio da Rosa

Atletico Marte

- (Uruguay) Jose Mario Figueroa

Chalatenango

- (Argentina)

(player released mid season) (player Injured mid season) Injury replacement player

Cojutepeque

- (Brazil) Salvador Filho
- (Panama) Frank Lozada
- (Panama) Percival Piggott
- (Panama) Ruben Guevara

Dragon

- (Brazil) Marco Antonio Pereira

C.D. FAS

- (Argentina) Carlos Alvarez
- (Uruguay) Hector Cedres
- (Uruguay) Eduardo Rinaldi

C.D. Luis Ángel Firpo

- (Brazil) Toninho Dos Santos
- (Brazil) Nildeson
- (Brazil) Fernando de Moura
- (Paraguay) Julio César Chávez

Metapan

- (Guatemala) Mynor Mendez
- (Paraguay) Gervasio Martínez
