= 1997–98 Primera División de El Salvador =

Primera División de Fútbol Profesional
- Season: 1997–98
- Champions: LA Firpo (5th Title)
- Relegated: EL Roble

The 1997–98 Primera División de El Salvador was the 47th tournament of El Salvador's Primera División since its establishment of the National League system in 1948. . The tournament began November 1997 and ended on May 31, 1998. Luis Angel Firpo won the championship game against FAS 2–0.

== Notable events ==
=== Change of name and ownership ===
Atletico Marte changed to Atletico Arabe Marte in 1997.

=== New team ===
Atlético Arabe Marte from Soyapango were promoted, however the club relocated from Soyapango and moved to Sonsonate and Played under Sonsonate.

=== Notable death from 1997 season and 1998 season ===
The following people associated with the Primera Division have died between the middle of 1997 and middle of 1998.

- Jorge Joaquin Canas (ex FAS player)
- Juan Francisco Barraza (ex Dragon and Aguila player and ex FAS, Aguila coach)

== Teams ==
Team	City	Stadium	Head coach	Captain
Aguila	San Miguel, San Miguel Department	Estadio Juan Francisco Barraza	(El Salvador) Juan Ramon Paredes	(El Salvador) Waldir Guerra
Alianza	San Salvador, San Salvador Department	Estadio Cuscatlan	(Uruguay) Jose Mario Figueroa	(El Salvador)
Atletico Arabe Marte	San Salvador, San Salvador Department	Estadio Cuscutlan	(El Salvador) Armando Contreras Palma	(El Salvador)
Baygon-ADET	San Salvador, San Salvador Department	Estadio C. Sello de Oro	(El Salvador) Victor Manuel Pacheco	(El Salvador)
Dragon	San Miguel, San Miguel Department	Estadio Juan Francisco Barraza	(Uruguay) German Barreto	(El Salvador) Daniel Sagastizado
EL Roble	Ilobasco, Cabañas Department	Estadio Mauricio Vides	(Costa Rica) Didier Castro	(El Salvador) Martin Pantajo
FAS	Santa Ana, Santa Ana Department	Estadio Oscar Quiteno	(Paraguay) Nelson Brizuela	(El Salvador) Jaime Murillo
Firpo	Usulután, Usulután Department	Estadio Sergio Torres	(Chile) Julio Escobar	(El Salvador) Leonel Carcamo
C.D. Municipal Limeno	Santa Rosa de Lima, La Unión Department	Estadio Ramon Flores Berrios	(Brazil) Antonio Carlos Vieira	(El Salvador)
C.D. Sonsonate	Sonsonate, Sonsonate Department	Estadio Ana Mercedes Campos	(Uruguay) Carlos Asdrúbal Padin	(El Salvador)

== Managerial changes ==
=== Before the season ===
Team	Outgoing manager	Manner of departure	Date of vacancy	Replaced by	Date of appointment	Position in table
FAS	(Brazil) Valdier Viera	Sacked	July 11, 1997	(Paraguay) Nelson Brizuela	October 1997	
El Roble	(El Salvador) Victor Manuel Pacheco	Sacked	October 1997	(Costa Rica) Didier Castro	October 1997	
Atletico Arabe Marte	(Argentina) Juan Quarterone	Sacked	1997	(El Salvador) Armando Contreras Palma	1997	
ADET	(El Salvador) Armando Contreras Palma	Sacked	1997	(El Salvador) Victor Manuel Pacheco	1997	
Aguila	(Federal Republic of Yugoslavia) Mladen Stefanovic	Sacked	1997	(El Salvador) Juan Ramon Paredes	1997	
Dragon	(Honduras) Gilberto Yearwood	Sacked	1997	(Uruguay) German Barreto	1997	
Municipal Limeno	(Honduras) Alfredo Romero (Intermship)	Intermship ended, moved to be assistant	1997	(Brazil) Antonio Carlos Vieira	1997	
Alianza	(Uruguay) Juan Masnik	Contract finished	November 1997	(Uruguay) Jose Mario Figueroa	November 1997	

=== During the season ===
Team	Outgoing manager	Manner of departure	Date of vacancy	Replaced by	Date of appointment	Position in table
Aguila	(El Salvador) Juan Ramon Paredes	Sacked	January 1998	(Federal Republic of Yugoslavia) Milovan Doric	January 1998	
El Roble	(Costa Rica) Didier Castro	Mutual Consent	February 1998	(El Salvador) Luis Landos	February 1998	4th
Dragon	(Uruguay) German Barreto	Sacked	February 1998	(El Salvador) Domingo Ramos (’’Interim’’)	February 1998	8th
Dragon	(El Salvador) Domingo Ramos	Interimship finished returned to be assistant manager	March 1998	(El Salvador) Saúl Molina	March 1998	8th
Aguila	(Federal Republic of Yugoslavia) Milovan Doric	Mutual Consent, Due to Family Reason	April 1998	(Cuba) Lazaro Buchillon	April 1998	
El Roble	(El Salvador) Luis Landos	Sacked	April 1998	(Uruguay) Carlos Jurado	April 1998	10th
Sonsonate	(Uruguay) Carlos Asdrúbal Padin	Sacked	May 1998	(El Salvador) Cristo Farfan Velasquez	May 1998	9th
El Roble	(Uruguay) Carlos Jurado	Sacked	May 1998	(El Salvador) Jose Luis Siu	May 1998	10th

== Final Series ==
=== Semi Final ===
28 May 1998
15:00 (UTC-6)

LA Firpo	3-0	Alianza
TBD; TBD; TBD		Nil

Estadio

LA Firpo won 3-0 on aggregare

28 May 1998
15:00 (UTC-6)

FAS	0-0	Aguila
Nil		Nil

Estadio

FAS won 2-0 on aggregare

=== Final ===
May 31, 1998

Firpo	2-0	FAS
Abraham Monterrosa 8'; Raul Toro 65'	[ ]	Nil

Estadio Cuscatlán, San Salvador
Referee: Neftali Recinos

LA Firpo
GK	1	(El Salvador) Misael Alfaro
DF	24	(El Salvador) William Osorio
DF	3	(El Salvador) Leonel Cárcamo
DF	22	(El Salvador) Wilfredo Iraheta
DF	15	(El Salvador) Nelson Quintanilla	Substituted off
MF	10	(Chile) Raul Toro
MF	17	(El Salvador) Guillermo García (yellow card) 30'
MF	14	(El Salvador) Agustin Gamez (yellow card) 73'
DF	31	(El Salvador) Jorge Sanchez
FW	9	(El Salvador) Israel Castro	Substituted off
FW	11	(Brazil) Celio Rodriguez
Substitutes:
MF		(El Salvador) Carlos Hernandez	Substituted on
MF		(El Salvador) Abraham Monterrosa	Substituted on
Manager:
(Chile) Julio Escobar

FAS:
GK	25	(El Salvador) Adolfo Menéndez
DF	3	(El Salvador) Ricardo Cuellar (yellow card) 51' (red card)
DF	4	(El Salvador) Mario Mayen Meza
DF	5	(El Salvador) German Romano
DF	7	(El Salvador) Rene Penate
MF	24	(El Salvador) Erber Burgos
MF	8	(El Salvador) Guillermo Rivera	(substituted off) 29'
MF	36	(El Salvador) Cristian Álvarez
MF	17	(El Salvador) William Renderos
Fw	9	(El Salvador) Marlon Medrano	(substituted off) 72'
FW	11	(El Salvador) Oscar Diaz
Substitutes:
MF		(El Salvador) Jaime Vladimir Cubías	(substituted on) 29' (yellow card) 52'
MF		(El Salvador) Mágico González	(substituted on) 72'
Manager:
(Paraguay) Nelson Brizuela

1997–98 champion

5th title

== Top scorers ==
Pos	Player	Team	Goals
1.	(El Salvador) Alfredo ‘Chelito’ Pérez	LA Firpo	15
2	(Brazil) Celio Rodriguez	LA Firpo	12
3.	(Chile) Raul Toro	LA Firpo	12
4.	(El Salvador) Cesar Elmer Acevedo	Sonsonate	10
5.	(El Salvador) Carlos Francisco Contreras	ADET	9
6.	(Uruguay) Carlos Edgard Villareal	Aguila	9
7.	(El Salvador) Waldir Guerra	Aguila	8
8.	(El Salvador) Magdonio Antonio Corrales	Municipal Limeno	8
9.	(El Salvador) Rene Martinez Parada	El Roble	8
10.	(El Salvador) William Renderos Iraheta	FAS	7

== List of foreign players in the league ==
This is a list of foreign players in 1997-1998. The following players:

1. have played at least one game for the respective club.
2. have not been capped for the El Salvador national football team on any level, independently from the birthplace

C.D. Águila

- (Brazil) Jose Luis Ferrera
- (Uruguay) Jorge Garay
- (Uruguay) Carlos Villarreal

Alianza F.C.

- (Argentina) Marcelo Bauza
- (Argentina) Horacio Lugo
- (Uruguay) Fernando Rinaldi

Atletico Marte

- (Honduras) German Perez
- (Uruguay) Jorge Charquero

Baygon-ADET

- (Colombia) Juan Carlos Canchimbo
- (Honduras) Pali Castillo

Dragon

- (Brazil) Delvani Quaresma
- (Costa Rica) Miguel Segura
- (Uruguay) Julio Sopena
- (Honduras) Roberto Bailey

(player released mid season) (player Injured mid season) Injury replacement player

El Roble

- (Honduras) Martin Garcia
- (Honduras) Ivan Nolasco
- (Honduras) Presley Carlson Wood

C.D. FAS

- (Argentina) Emiliano Pedrozo
- (Argentina) Juan Manuel Villarreal
- (Costa Rica) Gilber Solano

C.D. Luis Ángel Firpo

- (Brazil) Celio Rodriguez
- (Chile) Raul Toro
- (Honduras) Luis Oseguera

Limeno

- (Argentina) Juan Pablo Suarez
- (Brazil) Gerson Voss
- (Costa Rica) Carlos L. Marin
- (Costa Rica) Carlos Rodriguez

Sonsonate

- (Brazil) Fernando de Moura
- (Uruguay) Leonardo Rodriguez
