= Menjívar =

Menjívar or Menjivar is a Spanish surname. It may refer to:

== People ==
- Alejandra Menjívar (born 1985), Salvadoran LGBTQ activist
- Carlos Menjívar (born 1981), Salvadoran former footballer
- Cecilia Menjívar (born 1959), Salvadoran-American sociologist
- Edrick Menjívar (born 1993), Salvadoran footballer
- Evelio Menjivar-Ayala (born 1970), Salvadoran-born Auxiliary Bishop of Washington
- Frank Menjívar (born 1992), Salvadoran parliamentarian
- Ivan Menjivar (born 1982), Salvadoran-Canadian mixed martial artist
- Leonardo Menjívar (born 2001), Salvadoran footballer
- Marlon Menjívar (born 1965), Salvadoran former footballer
- Rafael Menjívar (disambiguation), various people
- Richard Menjívar (born 1990), Salvadoran footballer
- Violeta Menjívar (born 1952), Salvadoran politician
- Zulia Menjívar (born 1992), Salvadoran footballer

== See also ==
- Mengíbar
