= 1959 Salvadoran Primera División =

Primera División de Fútbol Profesional
- Season: 1959
- Champions: Aguila (1st Title)
- Relegated: Independiente

The 1959 Primera División de Fútbol Profesional season is the th tournament of El Salvador's Primera División since its establishment of the National League system in 1948. The tournament began on TBD and finished on November 29, 1959. Aguila secured its first Primera División title.

== Team Information ==
=== Personnel and sponsoring ===
Team	Chairman	Head coach	Captain	Kitmaker	Shirt sponsor
Águila	(El Salvador) TBD	(El Salvador) Conrado Miranda	(El Salvador) TBD	TBD	TBD
Atlético Constancia	(El Salvador) TBD	(El Salvador) TBD	(El Salvador) TBD	TBD	TBD
Atlante	(El Salvador) TBD	(El Salvador) TBD	(El Salvador) TBD	TBD	TBD
Atlético Marte	(El Salvador) TBD	(El Salvador) TBD	(El Salvador) TBD	TBD	TBD
Dragon	(El Salvador) TBD	(El Salvador) TBD	(El Salvador) TBD	TBD	TBD
FAS	(El Salvador) TBD	(El Salvador) TBD	(El Salvador) TBD	TBD	TBD
Independiente	(El Salvador) TBD	(El Salvador) TBD	(El Salvador) TBD	TBD	TBD
Juventud Olímpica	(El Salvador) TBD	(El Salvador) TBD	(El Salvador) TBD	TBD	TBD
Leones F.C.	(El Salvador) TBD	(El Salvador) TBD	(El Salvador) TBD	TBD	TBD
Santa Anita	(El Salvador) TBD	(El Salvador) TBD	(El Salvador) TBD	TBD	TBD

== League standings ==
Pos	Team	Pld	W	D	L	GF	GA	GD	Pts	Qualification or relegation
1	FAS	18	11	4	3	52	15	+37	26	
2	Aguila	18	12	2	4	42	22	+20	26	Champion
3	Atlético Constancia	18	10	4	4	37	21	+16	24	
4	Atlante	18	9	5	4	33	16	+17	23	
5	Atletico Marte	18	9	1	8	26	29	−3	19	
6	Leones FC	18	7	3	8	33	35	−2	17	
7	Santa Anita	18	4	6	8	16	26	−10	14	
8	Juventud Olimpico	18	4	5	9	26	35	−9	13	
9	Dragon	18	3	4	11	16	36	−20	10	
10	Independiente (R)	18	3	2	13	15	61	−46	8	Relegated to the Segunda División de El Salvador

Updated to match(es) played on 2015. Source: (in Spanish)
Rules for classification: 1) points; 2) goal difference; 3) number of goals scored.
(R) Relegated

== Final ==
22 November, 1959

Aguila	4-0	FAS
Raul Lizano 10'; Salvador Rocabruna 59'; Juan Francisco Barraza 61'; Juan Antonio Merlos 80'	[ ]	Nil

Estadio Flor Blanco, San Salvador
November 29, 1959

FAS	0-1	Aguila
Nil	[ ]	Saúl Molina 15'

Estadio Flor Blanco, San Salvador

== Records ==
=== Team records ===
- Best home records: TBD (00 points out of 33 points)
- Worst home records: TBD (0 points out of 33 points)
- Best away records : TBD (00 points out of 33 points)
- Worst away records : TBD (0 points out of 33 points)
- Most goals scored: FAS (52 goals)
- Fewest goals scored: Independiente F.C. (15 goals)
- Fewest goals conceded : FAS (15 goals)
- Most goals conceded : Independiente F.C. (61 goals)

=== Scoring ===
- Most goals in a match: 12 goals
  - FAS 11-1 Independiente F.C. (May 3, 1959)
- Most goals by one team in a match: 11 goals
  - FAS 11-1 Independiente F.C. (May 3, 1959)

== Top scorers ==
Pos	Player	Team	Goals
1.	(Argentina) Héctor Dadderio	FAS	TBD
2.	(El Salvador) TBD	TBD	TBD
3.	(El Salvador) TBD	TBD	TBD
4.	(El Salvador) TBD	TBD	TBD
5.	(El Salvador) TBD	TBD	TBD
6.	(El Salvador) TBD	TBD	TBD
7.	(El Salvador) TBD	TBD	TBD
8.	(El Salvador) TBD	TBD	TBD
9.	(El Salvador) TBD	TBD	TBD
10.	(El Salvador) TBD	TBD	TBD

== List of foreign players in the league ==
This is a list of foreign players in 1959 Campeonato. The following players:

1. have played at least one apertura game for the respective club.
2. have not been capped for the El Salvador national football team on any level, independently from the birthplace

C.D. Águila

- (Costa Rica) Raúl Lizano
- (Costa Rica) Fernando Justiniano Jiménez
- (Honduras) Manuel Larios
- (Uruguay) Raúl Vásquez

Atlético Constancia

- (Chile)

Atletico Marte

- (Argentina)

Atlante

- (Costa Rica)

Dragon

- (Argentina)

(player released mid season) (player Injured mid season) Injury replacement player

C.D. FAS

- (Argentina) Hector Marinaro
- (Argentina) Omar Muraco
- (Argentina) Héctor Dadderio
- (Argentina) José "Chingolo" Rodríguez

Independiente

- (Argentina)

Juventud Olimpico

- (Uruguay)

Leones

- (Honduras)

Santa Anita

- (Uruguay)
