= Rafael Menjívar =

Rafael Menjivar can refer to:

- Rafael Menjívar Larín (1935–2000), Salvadoran economist and politician
- Rafael Menjívar Ochoa (1959–2011), Salvadoran writer, novelist, journalist and translator, the former's son
