= Marcelo Estrada =

Salvadoran footballer (died 2002)

Personal information
- Place of birth: Santa Tecla, El Salvador
- Date of death: 29 March 2002
- Place of death: El Salvador

Senior career*
Years	Team	Apps	(Gls)
- Colegio Santa Cecilia

International career
- El Salvador

Managerial career
- 1953: El Salvador
- 1961: Escuela Normal “Alberto Masferrer”
- 1962–1964: Juventud Olimpica
- 1964: Santanita
- 1965–1966: Atlante
- 1968–1969: UES
- Alianza
- 1974: Luis Ángel Firpo
- Quequeisque
- 1975–1976: El Salvador
- * Club domestic league appearances and goals

Marcelo Estrada (died 29 March 2002) was a Salvadoran football player and coach.
