= Joaquín Canales =

Salvadoran footballer (born 1963)

Personal information
- Full name: Joaquín Canales Escobar
- Date of birth: April 11, 1963 (age 63)
- Place of birth: San Salvador, El Salvador
- Height: 1.74 m (5 ft 9 in)
- Position: Midfielder

Senior career*
Years	Team	Apps	(Gls)
1980–1988	Alianza FC		
1989	Washington Diplomats		
1989–1997	Alianza FC		

International career
	El Salvador	5	(0)
- * Club domestic league appearances and goals as of 11 January 2014

Joaquín Canales Escobar (born April 11, 1963) is a Salvadoran former footballer.

== Club career ==
With the exception of a short spell in the United States with the Washington Diplomats, Canales has played all of his professional career with his hometown club, Alianza FC.

== International career ==
Canales made his debut for El Salvador in 1984 and earned a total of five caps in 8 years, scoring a 15 goals. He played at the 1991 UNCAF Nations Cup.
