= Luis Antonio Regalado =

Salvadoran footballer and coach (1922-2001)

Personal information
- Full name: Luis Antonio Regalado Reyes
- Date of birth: January 10, 1922
- Place of birth: La Unión, El Salvador
- Date of death: 2001 (Aged 79)
- Place of death: El Salvador
- Position: Midfielder

Senior career*
Years	Team	Apps	(Gls)
- Libertad
- Espana
1939–1952	Luis Ángel Firpo		
1955-1957	Atlético Marte		

International career
1943–1955	El Salvador	62	(3)
Medal record
Representing El Salvador
Men's Football
Central American and Caribbean Games
Gold medal – first place	1954 El Salvador	Team competition
- * Club domestic league appearances and goals

Luis Antonio Regalado Reyes (January 10, 1922 – 2001) was a Salvadoran footballer and coach.

== Club career ==
Regalado played for Salvadoran league clubs Libertad, Espana, Luis Ángel Firpo and Atlético Marte.

== International career ==
Nicknamed Loco (crazy), Regalado made his debut for El Salvador in a December 1943 CCCF Championship match against Guatemala and has earned a total of 62 caps, scoring 3 goals. These numbers include non-official matches. His final game for his country was on 19 June 1955.
