= Rafael Menjívar Ochoa =

Salvadoran writer, novelist, journalist and translator

Rafael Menjívar Ochoa (August 17, 1959, in San Salvador – April 27, 2011, in San Salvador) was a Salvadoran writer, novelist, journalist and translator.

== Life ==
His father, the economist Rafael Menjívar Larín, was director of the University of El Salvador. When the army occupied it in 1972, during which his father was jailed for a short period, after being exiled in Nicaragua they were forced out in January 1973 towards Costa Rica. In 1976, they settled in Mexico, where Menjívar Ochoa lived for 23 years. He studied music, theatre and English Literature, and published many books. His first of note being Historia del Traidor de Nunca Jamás, a novel written in 1984 for which he received the EDUCA Latinoamerican award. In 1990, he won the "Ramón del Valle Inclán" Latinoamerican Award. In 1999, he settled in El Salvador, where in 2001, he became a Coordinator of Letters (Literature director) and founded La Casa del Escritor (the House of the Writer), a project aimed at providing a formation of young writers, located at the house of Salvador Salazar Arrué. Despite being based in El Salvador, he continued to be active in Mexican projects, publishing books there. His widow is Salvadorean poet Krisma Mancía.

== Published works ==
- Historia del traidor de Nunca Jamás (1985), novel
- Algunas de las muertes (1986), poetry
- Histoire du Traître de Jamais Plus (1988), novel
- Los años marchitos (1990), novel
- Terceras personas (1996), narrative
- Los héroes tienen sueño (1998), novel
- Manual del perfecto transa (1999)
- De vez en cuando la muerte (2002), novel
- Trece (2003), novel
- Instructions pour vivre sans peau (2004), novel.
- Un buen espejo (2005), novel
- Tierces personnes (2005)
- Tiempos de locura. El Salvador 1979–1981 (2006), history essay for FLACSO
- Treize (2006), novel translation
- Miroirs (2006), translation
- Cualquier forma de morir (2006), novel
