= Michell Mercado =

Salvadoran footballer (born 1991)

Personal information
- Full name: Michell Mercado Martínez
- Date of birth: 22 September 1991 (age 35)
- Place of birth: Cartagena, Colombia
- Height: 1.77 m (5 ft 10 in)
- Position: Forward

Team information
- Current team: Alianza

Senior career*
Years	Team	Apps	(Gls)
2015–2019	El Roble		
2019–2020	El Vencedor		
2020–	Alianza		

International career^{‡}
2025–	El Salvador	1	(0)
- * Club domestic league appearances and goals as of 20 November 2025 ‡ National team caps and goals as of 20 November 2025

Michell Mercado Martinez (born 22 September 1991) is a professional footballer who plays as a forward.

Mercado became a naturalized citizen of El Salvador in 2025, and received his first call-up to the El Salvador national team a year later.
