= Jaime Rodríguez =

Salvadoran footballer (1959–2025)

Personal information
- Full name: Jaime Alberto Rodríguez Jiménez
- Date of birth: 17 January 1959
- Place of birth: San Salvador, El Salvador
- Date of death: 14 September 2025 (aged 66)
- Height: 1.85 m (6 ft 1 in)
- Positions: Right-back; centre back

Youth career
- 1974: Negocios Internacionales

Senior career*
| Years | Team | Apps | (Gls) |
| 1975–1977 | Alianza | | |
| 1978–1979 | FAS | | |
| 1980–1982 | Bayer Uerdingen | | |
| 1982–1987 | Léon | 139 | (6) |
| 1984–1985 | → KPV (loan) | 18 | (4) |
| 1987–1990 | Atlas | 67 | (11) |
| 1990 | Alianza | | |
| 1991–1992 | NKK | 18 | (5) |
| 1992–1993 | Yokohama Flügels | 17 | (4) |
| 1994 | Alianza | | |

International career
| 1979–1991 | El Salvador | 50 | (1) |

Managerial career
- 2000: Alianza
- 2002: San Salvador
- * Club domestic league appearances and goals

Jaime Alberto Rodríguez Jiménez (17 January 1959 – 14 September 2025) was a Salvadoran football player.

Rodríguez represented his country at the 1982 FIFA World Cup in Spain.

== Playing career ==
=== Club career ===
From an early age, Rodríguez showed talent. After being selected by C.D. Negocios Internacionales then Alianza, he began a football career, in the process becoming a great player in El Salvador, although not as highly rated as Mágico González.

A defender, Rodríguez played professionally for different clubs around the world. Among these were El Salvador's Alianza, Mexico's Club Léon and F.C. Atlas, and Germany's Bayer Uerdingen (now known as KFC Uerdingen 05). He also played for teams in Japan's NKK, Yokohama Flügels and Finland's KPV scoring 4 goals in 18 games during 1984–1985.

=== International career ===
Nicknamed La Chelona, Rodríguez represented his country in fifteen FIFA World Cup qualification matches and played in all three matches at the 1982 FIFA World Cup in Spain.

His final international game was an April 1991 UNCAF Nations Cup qualification match against Nicaragua.

== Managerial career ==
After retiring from football, Rodríguez started a coaching career at Alianza, but was sacked in 2002. He was a strong advocate for improvement in football organisations and programs in El Salvador. He was also a strong supporter for financial aid to Salvadoran sporting heroes of the past who were in need.

In 2009, he became President of the Salvadoran Institute of Sport (INDES) and was appointed coordinator of the El Salvador national team and in 2007 became the assistant coach of the Cuscatlecos.

Rodríguez participated in a charity match to raise funds for earthquake victims in his native El Salvador.

In 2012, Rodríguez was named member of the football commission of FIFA.

== Death ==
Rodríguez died from a cardiac arrest on 14 September 2025, at the age of 66.

== Playing statistics ==
Appearances and goals by club, season and competition
| Club | Season | League | | | National cup (Note: Includes Emperor's Cup.) | | League cup (Note: Includes J.League Cup.) | | Total | |
| Club | Season | Division | Apps | Goals | Apps | Goals | Apps | Goals | Apps | Goals |
|---|---|---|---|---|---|---|---|---|---|---|
| NKK | 1991–92 | JSL Division 2 | 15 | 4 | – | | 0 | 0 | 15 | 4 |
| Yokohama Flügels | 1992 | J1 League | – | | 0 | 0 | 4 | 0 | 4 | 0 |
| Yokohama Flügels | 1993 | J1 League | 2 | 0 | 0 | 0 | 0 | 0 | 2 | 0 |
| Yokohama Flügels | Total | | 2 | 0 | 0 | 0 | 4 | 0 | 6 | 0 |
| Career total | | | 17 | 4 | 0 | 0 | 4 | 0 | 21 | 4 |

== Honours ==
=== As a player ===
Alianza

- Primera División de Fútbol de El Salvador: 1989–90

Yokohama Flügels

- Emperor's Cup: 1993

Individual

- Named in the Top 25 Players in 1986
- Selection of the CONCACAF
