= Julio Palacios (footballer) =

Salvadoran footballer (born 1962)

Personal information
- Full name: Julio Amílcar Palacios Lozano
- Date of birth: January 18, 1962 (age 64)
- Place of birth: San Salvador, El Salvador
- Height: 1.82 m (6 ft 0 in)
- Position: Winger

Senior career*
Years	Team	Apps	(Gls)
1983–1994	Alianza		
1994–1995	Municipal Limeño		

International career^{‡}
1987–1993	El Salvador	32	(3)
- * Club domestic league appearances and goals ‡ National team caps and goals as of 26 July 2012

Julio Amílcar Palacios Lozano (born 18 January 1962) is a retired Salvadoran footballer.

== Club career ==
Palacios has played the majority of his career for Salvadoran giants Alianza.

== International career ==
Palacios Lozano made his debut for El Salvador in an April 1987 Olympic Games qualification match against Panama and has earned a total of 32 caps, scoring 3 goals. He has represented his country in 8 FIFA World Cup qualification matches as well as at the 1993 UNCAF Nations Cup.

His final international was a March 1993 friendly match against Bolivia.

=== International goals ===
Scores and results list El Salvador's goal tally first.

#	Date	Venue	Opponent	Score	Result	Competition
1	19 April 1987	Estadio Revolución, Panama City, Panama	Panama	1-0	1-1	1988 Olympic Games qualification
2	17 March 1992	LA Coliseum, Los Angeles, United States	Honduras		1-1	Friendly match
3	1 November 1992	Estadio Cuscatlán, San Salvador, El Salvador	Bermuda	1-0	4-1	1994 FIFA World Cup qualification
