= C.D. Luis Ángel Firpo =

Association football club in El Salvador

Luis Ángel Firpo
- Full name: Club Deportivo Luis Ángel Firpo
- Nicknames: Pamperos; Los Toros (The Bulls); Los Ultralempinos (The Ultra Lempimes)
- Short name: Firpo
- Founded: September 17, 1923; 103 years ago
- Ground: Estadio Sergio Torres
- Capacity: 10,000
- Chairman: (El Salvador) Ricardo Palacios Salmerón
- Manager: (Costa Rica) Marvin Solano
- League: (El Salvador) Primera División
- 2026 Clausura: Overall: 2nd Playoffs: Qualified
- Website: www.lafirpo.com.sv
Home colours	Away colours

Club Deportivo Luis Ángel Firpo (often abbreviated to Firpo) is a professional football club based in Usulután, El Salvador, that currently plays in the Primera División de El Salvador.

Founded as Tecún Umán in 1923, it was soon renamed in honor of Argentine boxer Luis Ángel Firpo, who became the first Latin American to fight for the heavyweight championship, knocking Jack Dempsey out of the ring on September 14, 1923.

Firpo has played at their home ground, Estadio Sergio Torres, since 1930. The team's mascot is the bull, a reference to Firpo, who was known as the Wild Bull of the Pampas. The club's traditional kit colours are white and red, blue is also used but it is less predominant. The colours were adopted from the Argentine side San Lorenzo de Almagro.

Some of the most prominent players from El Salvador, including Mauricio Cienfuegos and Raúl Díaz Arce, have played for L.A. Firpo.

The team has won a total of eleven Primera Division titles, the first coming in 1988–89 and the most recent in the 2025-2026 Apertura. The club's most successful period was between 1988 and 2000, when they won the league title seven times. Firpo has the fourth highest total of major honours won by a Salvadoran club, and their historical rival is Aguila.

== History ==
=== Early history and first golden era ===
On September 17, 1923, a group of Usulután citizens, mostly of European descent, decided to form a team that represented their community's passion for football. The club elected Gustavo Denys as their first club chairman. They decided to choose red and blue as their team's colours. Originally named Tecún Umán, the club was soon renamed in honor of Luis Ángel Firpo, a famous Argentine boxer.

On November 9, 1923, Club Deportivo Sandino, also based in Usulutan, wanted to merge with Firpo, and it almost came to fruition. However, the main sticking point was that Sandino wanted to appoint the majority of the 41 club directors (36 to Sandino and only five Firpo directors). Following the impasse, Firpo rejected the offer. The members of Luis Ángel Firpo later acquired land near Sergio Torres creek to develop and build a stadium.

At the end of 1930s, Former player Miguel el Zancudo Segurado was named football manager, He centred the team around potent players such as Luis Chispo Morataya, Queco Bolanos, Napoleon Flores Huezo, the Zamora brothers (Ricardo and Miguel), the Quinteros brothers (Leonidas and Lázaro), and the Aguila brothers (Ramón and Mario). The most influential player was midfielder Luis Antonio Regalado, who in 1942 become the first player from LA Firpo to represent El Salvador's national team.

On 22 March 1942, Firpo won their first state title for the Zona Oriental (Eastern State), defeating America de Chinameca 2–1. This allowed them to compete in a round robin competition for the national title against Quequeisque (Central State champion), Ferroccarril (Zona Occidente) and Juventud Olímpica. Firpo lost their first match against Quequeisque 6–1, this was followed by a 2–1 win against Ferrocarrill, however Quequeisque won the title due to winning two games and drawing one. Firpo finished in third place.

On 25 April 1943, Firpo won their second Zona Oriental title by defeating Corona (San Miguel) 5–3. Once again Firpo competed in a round robin competition for the national title. In the first game Firpo played against reigning champion Quequeisque were the game was tied for the majority of the game 1-1 thanks to goal from Leonidas Quinteros, Sadly Firpo were not able to hold back the tide and lost the game 8–1. This was followed by 2–2 draw against Ferrocarill, another heavy loss against Quequeisque 7–1, and their only victory in the tournament 2–1 against Ferrocarrill. Firpo once again finished in third place.

Due to World War 2, no state competition or final competition were played, Firpo played a series of friendlies which included 3–2 loss against Quequeisque, 5–0 loss against Espana, 2–1 loss against Mecca, and 1–0 win against Juventud Olímpica.

In 1946, Firpo played their first ever international against Honduran Federal tying 3-3, with all three goals scored by Rafael Galvez.

In 1948, Firpo participated in the first national championship. Firpo played 22 out of 24 games, winning 16 games, drawing 7 games, and losing 6 games with a fifth-place finish. . Firpo didn't play the final two games as Once Municipal were crowned national champion with two games to spare.

=== Difficult years, moderate success and downfall ===
The following years were plagued with financial instability, players from the first golden era started retiring or leaving. This culminated with the disastrous 1951-52 Campaign, which included 5–0 loss against Leones, 5–4 loss against Independiente, a stripped 2–1 victory Santa Anita due to players being ineligible, their first victory coming after more than half the season played against Juventud Olímpica; this would be their only victory as they only gained five points and finished last in the league.

After signing Honduran Armando Enamorado and Costa Rican Jacobo Godoy ahead of the 1955–56 season, the club finished runner up by one point to Atletico Marte. In the 1957–58 season Firpo was relegated to the second division after only grabbing 13 points from 20 games.

Firpo hired Former player Narciso Romagoza to coach the team in the second division. Romangoza led the team to the final round robin tournament against El Renacimiento de Santa Ana and Platense. Firpo finished the tournament as champion after winning two games, 1 draw and one loss. This allowed Firpo to be promoted after one season, but the same issues arose with economic problems and players departing, which culminated in Firpo being relegated to second division just two years later.

=== "Yo-yo club": consecutive promotion and relegations ===
After being relegated in 1962, The club was stuck in the second division for four years, but in 1967 - thanks to players such as Raul Corcio Zavaleta, and foreign players Andres Paretti & Julio Escobar, Firpo were able to finish in the top spot over historic clubs Dragon, Santa Anita and Rey Y Negro. However the success was short lived as they were relegated just two years later in 1969.

In 1972, Firpo decided to hire more experienced players including 1970 World Cup player Sergio Méndez, Alfredo Erado, Fausto Vasquez and Miguel Miche Cornejo, they once again were able to reach promotion. Although Firpo were technically relegated in 1982, Firpo purchased Agave's first division spot for 25,000 colones and remained in the top division. During this period Firpo were struggling financially off the field and on the field, finishing midtable or in the bottom half of the league.

=== Minor success and rebuild ===
Following this, Firpo president Gustavo Torres Cerna and nephew Sergio Torres Rivera made a collective, ambitious effort to rebuild the team; he brought quality foreign players such as Guillermo Fisher, Sebastian Pio da Silva, Carlos Lopez Neves and Nelson de Moraes. The latter, along with Francisco Jovel, made Firpo a solid team that was able to consistently qualify for the playoffs during the next five seasons; however, the club's decline in rhythm combined with poor goalscoring in the playoffs prevented them from any real success.

In 1988 nephew Sergio Torres Rivera took over the previous president position, which would begin Firpo's true glory years. Sergio Torres established a robust financial sponsorship, including a renewed partnership with El Salvador conglomerate La Tapachulteca and William Handal. The club would scout promising young players throughout the league such as future captain and national player Leonel Carcamo, Miguel Estrada, Juan Agustin Gamez, and Jose Maria Batres. This was combined with established experienced players such as Giovanni Trigueros, Nelson Rivera, Miguel Arevalo, Mauricio Cienfuegos, and Marlon Menjívar.

Finally they would send scouts down to South America, convincing Peruvian national team players Martín Duffó and Miguel Seminario to sign for the club, later stopping in Brazil to pick up Brazilian pairings Toninho dos Santos and Fernando Da Moura.

=== Golden generation ===
In the 1988–89 season, the team hoisted the league title for the first time. The team finished third in the regular season, but the club nonetheless dismissed Argentinian coach Juan Quarterone before the playoffs. In his place, they hired former player Chilean Julio Escobar. Escobar justified the club's faith by leading the team through the championship round and into the finals. Their match against Cojutepeque was drawn 2–2 after extra time, setting up a penalty shootout. Firpo prevailed 4–3, with Leonel Carcamo scoring the winning penalty.

The very next season (1989-90), the club reached their second consecutive final thanks to the efforts of Brazilian Toninho dos Santos, who was the league's topscorer with 25 goals; however, the club lost 3-1 to Alianza.

The following season (1990-91), the team were able to bolster their attack with the addition of Brazilian youngster Nildeson, (who would later be loaned out to Atletico Marte) and the hiring of Uruguayan coach Juan Masnik. The club went on a 31 match unbeaten streak beginning with a 1-1 draw with FAS in August 1990 and concluding in April 1991 after a 1-0 loss to Tiburones. Salvadoran Keeper Carlos Rivera and Brazilian defender Fernando de Moura had the distinction of participating in every game in the 31 game unbeaten streak. The club also made their biggest transfer in club history when they sold Brazilian Toninho dos Santos, who was the club top-scorer at the time with 11 goals, to Mexican powerhouse Club America for $100,000. Despite the loss of such a great player, the club went on to reach the final, thanks to leading scorer Edgar Henriquez with 12 goals. Firpo went on defeat Aguila 1–0 in the final with Marlon Menjívar scoring the sole goal.

After a successful campaign, Juan Masnik resigned as coach to return to Uruguay, and the club hired Yugoslavian Kiril Dojčinovski, who played for Yugoslavia in the 1974 World Cup. The club regained Brazilian Nildeson from loan, bought Chilean Raúl Toro and league top scorer Raúl Díaz Arce from Alianza and Dragon respectively, and lastly they promoted Fernando Lazo and Pedro Vasquez from the youth squad. The club lost experience players such as Uruguayans Luis Guelmo and Washington Olivera, and Mauricio Cienfuegos who moved to Mexican club Atlético Morelia. Under the reins of Kiril Dojčinovski, the club won back-to-back championships (1991-92 and 1992-93).

In the 1991-92 season, The club would finish first in the regular season and Quadrangular round; the club's continued dominance happened due to having multiple goal scorers, with Brazilian Fernando de Moura topping the list with 14 goals, followed by compatriot Nildeson with 12 goals, Raúl Díaz Arce with 8 goals, rounding out with Edgar Henriquez and Marlon Menjivar with 7 goals. The club showed their complete dominance in fthe inal, defeating Alianza 3-0 thanks to a double from Nildeson and a goal from Fernando de Moura.

In the 1992-93 season, the club was shocked by the departure of Kiril Dojčinovski during the pre-season, and was replaced by Chilean Hernan Carrasco. With the same squad, the club fell off pace and were behind Alianza and FAS during the final half of rounds, which led to the dismissal Hernan Carrasco. Dojčinovski was rehired and helped to steady the ship, allowing the club to finish second in the regular standings and win the Quadrangular round, which allowed the club to qualify to the final against Alianza. Once again the club would defeat Alianza thanks to goals from Brazilian Celio Rodriguez and Raul Diaz Arce. The club would win their first tri-Championship in their history and first since Atletico Marte who did it previously between the 1955 to 1957 seasons.

In the midst of domestic success, the cub would also prove themselves at the international level, first defeating Italian powerhouse Juventus and Armenia powerhouse Shirak in friendly matches. In the 1995 CONCACAF Cup Winners Cup, the club finished runner-up, losing the final 2-1 to Estudiantes Tecos.

Soon after, Leonel Carcamo donned the captain's armband and the club continued to play at a high level. They reached either the semi-finals or finals every year from 1994 to 1997, then won the championship again in 1998. That win came over FAS 2–0, with the goals being scored by Raúl Toro and Abraham Monterrosa.

Firpo won another championship in Clausura 1999, beating FAS 5–4 on penalty kicks after the game ended 1-1 after extra time. In 2000, club president and owner Sergio Torres died the week before the final match against ADET, and the players dedicated the match to his memory. They went on to win, bringing home their seventh title.

=== Modern era ===
After 2000, Firpo's success began to decline. With players retiring, moving abroad, or being sold onto other clubs, the death of Sergio Torres cost the team their primary sponsor and led the club into financial instability. As a result, Firpo reached the grand final repeatedly, but could not win another title for seven years.

In the 2007 Apertura, Argentinian coach Horacio Cordero guided the team to another final, and they defeated FAS 5–3 in a penalty shootout.

The next season saw the club hoist the crown again, winning the Clausura 2008. They beat FAS again, 1–0,.

The team won their tenth title in the 2013 Clausura under the direction of Argentinian coach Roberto Gamarra with another win over their rivals FAS.

On May 5, 2014, after 32 years of top-flight football, Firpo were relegated to the second division after a 1–1 draw with Dragón. However, the relegation didn't stay, as Firpo purchased Juventud Independiente's license. On May 27, 2019, the club achieved a record sixth relegation from the Primera Division, after the team lost 3–1 against Alianza.

At the end of the 2020 season, Pablo Herrera (owner of the franchise license of Independiente) announced that Independiente will lose their license and he will be giving the license to Luis Angel Firpo for the Clausura 2020.

In September 2023 the club celebrated a centenary of existence with a friendly against Guatemalan giant Municipal, which they lost 1–0.

== Honours ==
Luis Angel Firpo is historically the fourth most successful team in El Salvador, as they have won ten championships. The club's most recent trophy came in June 2013, with the Clausura 2013.

=== Domestic honours ===
==== League ====
- Primera División and predecessors
  - Champions (11): 1988–89, 1990–91, 1991–92, 1992–93, 1997–98, 1999 Clausura, 2000 Clausura, Apertura 2007, Clausura 2008, Clausura 2013, Apertura 2025
- Segunda División Salvadorean and predecessors
  - Champions (3): 1959, 1966–67, 1972
- Tercera División Salvadorean and predecessors
  - Champions: 2001–02

==== Cups ====
- Copa President and predecessors
  - Runners-up (2) : 1990–91, 2000

==== State Title ====
- Primera División and predecessors
  - Champions (3): 1942, 1943, 1946

==== CONCACAF ====
- CONCACAF Cup Winners Cup
  - Runners-up : 1995 CONCACAF Cup Winners Cup
- Torneo de la Fraternidad de Centroamérica
  - Champions: 1942

==== Friendly tournament ====
- Copa de las Americas
  - Runners-up (1): : 1989

== Club statistics and records ==
The salvadoran midfielder TBD holds the club's overall appearance record having played in matches over the course of 14 seasons from 19 to 19. Following him is former goalkeeper TBD who contested 000 matches over the course of 11 seasons from 1997 to 2008.

The club's all-time leading scorer is Raúl Díaz Arce, who scored 119 goals while at the club from 1991 to 1996. Brazilian Toninho dos Santos holds the record for most goals scored in a season, who notched 28 goals in the 1989-90 season.

Firpo's biggest league victory is 11–0 which occurred during the 1995 season against Cojutepeque. The club's biggest victory on the CONCACAF stage also occurred during the 1995 season, where Firpo hammered Curaçao-based club CRKSV Jong Colombia 8–0.

TBD had the longest reign as Firpo coach, with nine years (eight consecutive) in charge, and is the most successful coach in Firpo history with three Primera division wins.

== Stadium ==
Luis Ángel Firpo plays most of its home games at Estadio Sergio Torres in Usulután. Located in the Barrio La Parroquia, the stadium is an exception in Salvadorian football, because Firpo is the only team in the First Division that plays in its own stadium.

In 1987, the stadium was renamed after the former owner and president of the team. The stadium known as Usulután Stadium became known as Sergio Torres Rivera Stadium.

=== Home stadium ===
- Estadio Sergio Torres (1950–present)
- Estadio Cuscatlán (2002-Current) (big game venue)
- Estadio Jorge "El Mágico" González, San Salvador (2024-Current) games in the CONCACAF Central American Cup.

== Fan culture ==
=== Club badge and colours ===
Luis Angel Firpo's home colours are white, blue and red. Traditional away kit colours have been either red or white and blue; however, in recent years several different colours have been used.

Their first logo contained a figure of a bull in honor of the "toro de las pampas" of the boxer Luis Ángel Firpo. However, later the board of Luis Ángel Firpo decided to replace the bull with the official coat of arms which consisted of a triangle with two half circles which contained the blue and white letters of the club. On top of the coat of arms contains stars which indicate the number of titles the team has won.

=== Uniform evolution ===
- Primary

-2025	2025–

- Alternate

-2025

=== Kit manufacturers and shirt sponsors ===
Period	Company
1988–2008	(El Salvador) Galaxia
2009–2013	(Spain) Joma
2015	(El Salvador) Toros
2016	(El Salvador) Galaxia
2017	(Spain) Kelme
2018	(El Salvador) Galaxia
2018	(El Salvador) AVIVA
2021–2022	(El Salvador) Milan
2022–2024	(El Salvador) Galaxia
2025–present	(El Salvador) Salguero Sports

Companies that LA Firpo currently has sponsorship deals with include:

- (El Salvador) Salguero Sports – official kit suppliers
- Cablesat El Salvador – official sponsors
- (El Salvador) Arte Cerveza – official sponsors
- (El Salvador) Diagri – official sponsors
- (El Salvador) Roxy – official sponsors
- (El Salvador) Empresa Agricola Jesus Grande – official sponsors
- (Hungary) Gana777 – official sponsors
- (El Salvador) La Pirraya – official sponsors
- (Australia) Catapult Sports – official sponsors
- (El Salvador) Canal 4 – official sponsors

As of January 2025

Period	Kit Manufacturer	Shirt Sponsor	Sleeve Sponsor
2025–present	Salguero Sports	Diagri, Cablesat, Arte Cerveza	INDES, Canal 4, Kool Fashion

=== Rivalries ===
- Luis Ángel Firpo v. Alianza. The match is known as (Clásico Joven) (Young classic) Although Alianza has one more title than Firpo.
- Luis Ángel Firpo v. Águila. The match is known as (Clásico de Oriente) (Eastern Classic). They are from the same Zone.
- One smallest but stronger and old rivalry could be Luis Ángel Firpo v. FAS.

== Supporters ==
Despite having a growing fan base across the country, there were no official fan groups until 1990 when Manuel Viagra founded the "Furia Pampera" in Usulután. They are currently the second largest fan base in San Salvador and the fourth largest nationwide.

=== Famous supporters ===
- Politics: Tony Saca (Former President of El Salvador)
- Politics: Roberto D'Aubuisson (Former Mayor of Santa Tecla)
- Singer and TV Personality: Daniel Rucks

== Presidents ==
Luis Ángel Firpo has had numerous presidents over the course of their history, some of which have been the owners of the club while others have been honorary presidents. Here is a complete list of them.

Name	Years
(El Salvador) (Belgium) Gustavo Denys	1930
(El Salvador) Santiago González	
(El Salvador) Julio López Jiménez	
(El Salvador) Juan Víctor Boillat Flores	1950
(El Salvador) Gilberto Flores Huezo	
(El Salvador) José Gregorio Zelaya	
(El Salvador) Humberto López	
(El Salvador) Sergio Torres Rivera	1987–1990
(El Salvador) Vicente Rogiero	
(El Salvador) Galileo Castañeda	
(El Salvador) Miguel Alcántara	

Name	Years
(El Salvador) David Urquilla	
(El Salvador) Lorenzo Campos	
(El Salvador) Salvador Jiménez	
(El Salvador) Ramón Aparicio	1982
(El Salvador) Gustavo Torres Cerna	1983
(El Salvador) Miguel Infantozzi Flores	
(El Salvador) Virgilio Machuca	
(El Salvador) Rafael Baires	
(El Salvador) Napoleón Osegueda	
(El Salvador) Enrique Santos	
(El Salvador) Fernando Alvarado	
(El Salvador) Ramiro Luna Boza	1971
(El Salvador) Ovidio Martínez	

Name	Years
(El Salvador) William Flores Handal	1997–1999
(El Salvador) Juan Torres	1999–2000
(El Salvador) Jozsef Arguedas	2001–2010
(El Salvador) Enrique Escobar	2010–2011
(El Salvador) Carlos Mendez Flores	2011–2014
(El Salvador) Tony Saca	2014
(El Salvador) Raúl Mendoza Galo	2015–2017
(El Salvador) Modesto Torres	2017–2019
(El Salvador) Juan Pablo Herrera	2020–2023
(El Salvador) Ricardo Palacios	2024
(El Salvador) Ronny Hernández	2025–present

== Players ==
=== Current squad ===
As of 30 July 2026: Note: Flags indicate national team as defined under FIFA eligibility rules; some limited exceptions apply. Players may hold more than one non-FIFA nationality.

No.	Pos.	Nation	Player
1	GK	ESA	Geonathan Barrera
2	DF	ESA	Marlón Cornejo
3	DF	COL	Wilbert Arizala
4	MF	ESA	Ervian Flores
5	DF	ESA	Lizandro Claros (captain)
6	DF	ESA	Eduardo Vigil
7	FW	ESA	Styven Vásquez
8	MF	ESA	Bryan Landaverde
9	MF	ARG	Mauro Gonzalez
10	MF	ESA	Victor García
12	DF	ESA	Diego Flores
14	DF	ESA	Herson Rodríguez
15	MF	ESA	Marvin Aranda
16	MF	ESA	Óscar Cerén
17	MF	ESA	Mauricio Cerritos

No.	Pos.	Nation	Player
19	FW	ESA	Cristian Gil
20	FW	COL	Jose Valencia
21	FW	ESA	Elías Gumero
22	MF	ESA	Steven Mira
23	MF	ESA	Diego Guevara
24	DF	ESA	Jonathan Jiménez
25	GK	ESA	Felipe Amaya
26	MF	ESA	Michell Mercado
27	MF	ESA	Diego Ortez
28	MF	PAN	Rafael Aguilar
29	GK	ESA	Misael Erazo
30	DF	ESA	Jonathan Quintanilla
35	MF	ESA	Nelson Díaz
36	FW	ESA	Elmer Rodriguez
46	FW	ESA	Elmer Valladares

=== Players with dual citizenship ===
- (El Salvador) (Colombia) Cristian Gil
- (El Salvador) (United States) (Mexico) Geonathan Barrera
- (El Salvador) (Colombia) Michell Mercado

=== Out on loan ===
Note: Flags indicate national team as defined under FIFA eligibility rules; some limited exceptions apply. Players may hold more than one non-FIFA nationality.

No.	Pos.	Nation	Player
—		ESA	TBD (at TBD for the 2023-24 Apertura and Clausura)

=== In ===
Note: Flags indicate national team as defined under FIFA eligibility rules; some limited exceptions apply. Players may hold more than one non-FIFA nationality.

No.	Pos.	Nation	Player
—		ESA	Óscar Cerén (From Cacahuatique)
—		ESA	Jonathan Jiménez (From Alianza)
—		ESA	Michell Mercado (From Alianza)
—		COL	Jose Valencia (From Universitario de Vinto)
—	FW	ESA	Styven Vásquez (From Irapuato)
—	GK	ESA	Geonathan Barrera (From Dorados de Sinaloa)

No.	Pos.	Nation	Player
—		ESA	Steven Mira (From Talleres Jr)
—		ESA	Diego Guevara (From Talleres Jr)
—		PAN	Rafael Águila (From CAI)
—		ARG	Mauro González (From Rangers de Talca)

=== Out ===
Note: Flags indicate national team as defined under FIFA eligibility rules; some limited exceptions apply. Players may hold more than one non-FIFA nationality.

No.	Pos.	Nation	Player
—	FW	COL	André Morales (To TBD)
—	FW	PAR	Marcelo Ferreira (To TBD)
—	GK	ESA	Wilberth Hernández (To Cacahuatique)
—		ESA	José Alexi Quintanilla (To TBD)
—	FW	BRA	Lucas Matheus Dos Santos (To Mağusa TGS)

No.	Pos.	Nation	Player
—		ESA	Ken Mejía (To TBD)
—		ESA	César Orellana (To TBD)
—		ESA	Brian Martínez (To El Vencedor)
—		ESA	Jeremis Lemus (To TBD)

== Current technical staff ==
As of January 2026

List of C.D. Luis Angel Firpo managers
Role	Person .
Head Coach	(Costa Rica) Marvin Solano Abarca (*)
Assistant Head Coach	(Costa Rica) Kevin Sancho (*)
Reserve Head Coach	(El Salvador) Ever Mejia (*)
Sports Director	(El Salvador) Ever Mejia (*)
Under 17 Coach	(El Salvador) Carlos Martinez (*)
Fitness Coach	(Colombia) (Costa Rica) Esteban Cortes Padilla (*)
Goalkeeping Coach	(El Salvador) Jesús Álvarez (*)
Physical Trainer	(El Salvador) TBD (*)
Fitness Coach/Sports Therapist	(El Salvador) TBD (*)
Team Doctor	(El Salvador) TBD
Equipment manager	(El Salvador) TBD (*)
Teams Sport Psychologist	(El Salvador) Vitelio Coreas (*)
Ladies team Head Coach	(El Salvador) TBD

=== Reserve League squad ===
Firpo's reserve squad plays in the twelve-team Primera División Reserves (El Salvador).

Note: Flags indicate national team as defined under FIFA eligibility rules; some limited exceptions apply. Players may hold more than one non-FIFA nationality.

No.	Pos.	Nation	Player
31		ESA	Luis Campos
32		ESA	Juan José Lemus
33		ESA	José Castro Hernández
34		ESA	Steven Quintanilla
35		ESA	Edwin García
36		ESA	Gerson Rivas
37		ESA	Miguel Granados
38		ESA	Carlos Quiros

No.	Pos.	Nation	Player
39		ESA	Bryan Membreño Perdomo
40		ESA	Edys Rodríguez
41		ESA	Rafael Gamez Bonilla
42		ESA	Miguel Ángel Ramírez
43		ESA	José Flores
44		ESA	César Carpio
45		ESA	Emerson Pineda

== Corporate structure ==
As of January 2025

Club Administrative Staff
Role	Person	Season.
President	(El Salvador) Ronny Hernández	2025–26
Vice-president	(El Salvador) Eugenio Aviles	2024–25
Assistant Vice-president	(El Salvador) Macedonio Mejia	2024-25
Sporting director	(El Salvador) TBD	2024-25
Assistant sporting director	(El Salvador) TBD	2024–25
General director	(El Salvador) Orlando Hernández Torres (*)	2025–26
Secretary general	(El Salvador) Luis Quintanilla	2024–25
Assistant Secretary general	(El Salvador) TBD	2024-25
Treasurer	(El Salvador) Jair Montaya	2024-25
Assistant Treasurer	(El Salvador) Jesus Bindico	2024-25
Television Manager	(El Salvador) TBD	2024-25
Assistant Manager	(El Salvador) TBD	2024-25
Sports Marketing Manager	(El Salvador) TBD	2024-25
Assistant Sports Marketing Manager	(El Salvador) TBD	2024-25
Legal Representative	(El Salvador) TBD	2024-25

== Notable players ==
Note: this list includes players that have appeared in at least 50 league games and/or have reached international status.

National player
- (El Salvador) Raúl Arce (119 goals)
- (El Salvador) Carlos Borja
- (El Salvador) Leonel Cárcamo
- (El Salvador) Mauricio Cienfuegos
- (El Salvador) Edgar Henríquez
- (El Salvador) Manuel Martínez
- (El Salvador) Marlon Menjívar
- (El Salvador) Carlos Monteagudo
- (El Salvador) Abraham Monterrosa
- (El Salvador) Antonio Regalado (1939–1952)
- (El Salvador) Leonidas Quinteros (1935–1955)
- (El Salvador) Marcos Tulio Quinteros (1935–1959)
- (El Salvador) Lazaro Quinteros (1939–1959)
- (El Salvador) Manuel Salazar
International Player
- (Argentina) Patricio Barroche (2007–2009)
- (Argentina) Mario Costas (2007)
- (Argentina) Fernando Leguizamón (2009–2010)
- (Argentina) Leonardo Pekarnik (2008–2009)
- (Brazil) Fernando De Moura (1989–1992)
- (Brazil) Nelson de Moraes (1974-1978)
- (Chile) Raúl Toro (1991–2000)
- (Honduras) Armando Enamorado (1955–1956)
- (Honduras) Jacobo “Tico” Godoy (1955–1956)
- (Spain) Jose Jaime Ferrer (first foreign player firpo history)
- (Trinidad and Tobago) Jomal Williams (2021–2022)

Naturalized Player
- (Brazil) (El Salvador) Celio Rodríguez (56 goals)
- (Brazil) (El Salvador) Nenei da Silva
- (Honduras) (El Salvador) Franklin Webster
- (Panama) (El Salvador) Anel Canales (2011-2014) (54 goals)

=== Captains ===
Years	Captain
1967-1968	(El Salvador) Ernesto Bolívar
1975	(El Salvador) Tomás Pineda (GK)
1980	(El Salvador) Samuel Rodriguez Gochez Tierrita
1982	(El Salvador) Amadeo Machado “Tractor” (DF)
1984–1985	(El Salvador) Abraham "El Peñero" Vazquez (DF)
1988–1989	(El Salvador) Abraham "El Peñero" Vazquez (DF)
1990–1992	(El Salvador) Miguel Estrada Cuerno (DF)
1993-1998	(El Salvador) Leonel Carcamo (DF)
1999	(Brazil) (El Salvador) Celio Rodríguez (FW)
2000	(El Salvador) Leonel Carcamo (DF)
2003–2004	(El Salvador) Héctor Canjura (DF)
2005–2006	(El Salvador) Jorge Sanchez (DF)
2007–2008	(El Salvador) Guillermo Morán (DF)
2009–2010	(El Salvador) Manuel Salazar (DF)
2010–2013	(El Salvador) Jorge Sanchez (DF)
2013	(El Salvador) Dennis Alas (MF)
2013, 2015	(El Salvador) Mauricio Quintanilla (MF)
2014	(Panama) Anel Canales (FW)
2015	(El Salvador) Marlon Martínez (MF)
2016–2017	(El Salvador) (Honduras) Williams Reyes (FW)
2017 *	(El Salvador) Isaac Zelaya (MF)
2017–2018	(Colombia) Jhony Rios (DF)
2018	(Argentina) Rodrigo de Brito (DF)
2019	(El Salvador) Edwin Martinez (DF)
2020–2021	(Colombia) Tardelis Peña (DF)
2022	(Trinidad and Tobago) Jomal Williams (FW)
2022–2023	(El Salvador) Eduardo Vigil (DF)
2023	(Colombia) Tardelis Pena (DF)
2024	(El Salvador) Alexis Maravilla (DF)
2024–2025	(El Salvador) Wilberth Hernández (GK)
2025–present	(El Salvador) Lizandro Claros (DF)

=== All-time XI ===

Luis Angel Firpo All-time First XI

In 2023, as part of Firpo's centenary, the newspaper El Grafico released their top 11 players of all time.

Position	Player	Years at club
GK	(El Salvador) Carlos Rivera	1989-1994, 1997-1998
RB	(El Salvador) Giovanni Trigueros	1979–1980
RCB	(El Salvador) Leonel Carcamo	1985-2001
LCB	(El Salvador) José Francisco Jovel	1972–78; 1984–87
LB	(El Salvador) Jorge Sanchez	2003–2012
RM	(El Salvador) Marlon Menjívar	1988–1997
CDM	(Brazil) Fernando De Moura	1989–1992
CM	(El Salvador) Mauricio Cienfuegos	1988–91; 1994–96
LM	(Chile) Raúl Toro Basáez	1991–2000
RW	(El Salvador) Raul Diaz Arce	1991–96
LW	(Brazil) Nildeson	1989–1990;1991–1992;1998–1999;2004

== Managers ==
Costa Rican Marvin Solano Abarca has been the club's manager since 2025. Costa Rican Ramón Rodríguez Soto was Firpo's first manager from outside El Salvador. Chilean Julio Escobar is the club's most successful coach, having won four Primera División titles; following closely is Macedonian Kiril Dojčinovski, who won two Primera División titles (back to back championships).

Managers with at least one trophy
Name	Period	Trophies
(Chile) Julio Escobar	1987-1989, 1994–1995, 1997–1998, 1999-May 2001	4 Primera División de Fútbol Profesional
(North Macedonia) Kiril Dojčinovski	1991–1993, 1995–1996, November 1996-December 1996	2 Primera División de Fútbol Profesional
(Uruguay) Juan Masnik	1990–1991	1 Primera División de Fútbol Profesional
(Argentina) Horacio Cordero	July 2007–November 2007	1 Primera División de Fútbol Profesional
(Argentina) Gerardo Reinoso	January 2008–May 2008	1 Primera División de Fútbol Profesional
(Argentina) Roberto Gamarra	March 2013–September 2013, November 2020–February 2022	1 Primera División de Fútbol Profesional
(Costa Rica) Marvin Solano	June 2025–Present	1 Primera División de Fútbol Profesional

== Other Departments ==
=== Reserve team ===
The reserve team serves mainly as the final stepping stone for promising young players under the age of 21 before being promoted to the main team. the team plays in the Primera División Reserves, their greatest successes was winning the Reserve championships three times (Clausura 2002, Apertura 2004, Apertura 2006). It plays its home matches at Estadio Sergio Torres, adjacent to the first teams and women's team.

==== List of LA Firpo Reserves ====
As of November 2025

List of LA Firpo Reserve managers
Name	Years .	Notes
(El Salvador) Ever Mejia	2024-Present	TBD
(El Salvador) TBD	TBD(*)	TBD

=== Current squad ===
As of: June, 2025 Note: Flags indicate national team as defined under FIFA eligibility rules; some limited exceptions apply. Players may hold more than one non-FIFA nationality.

No.	Pos.	Nation	Player
—		ESA	Yasser Bonilla
—		ESA	Elmer Rodriguez
—		ESA	Gabriel Guzman
—		ESA	Jeyson Sanchez
—		ESA	Kerin Torres

No.	Pos.	Nation	Player
—		ESA	TBD
—		ESA	TBD
—		ESA	TBD
—		ESA	TBD
—		ESA	TBD

=== Junior teams ===
The club also fields under 17 and under 15 teams. The under 17 team's greatest success was winning the title in the Clausura 2025 season. The team is managed by Carlos Martinez

=== Current squad ===
As of: June, 2025 Note: Flags indicate national team as defined under FIFA eligibility rules; some limited exceptions apply. Players may hold more than one non-FIFA nationality.

No.	Pos.	Nation	Player
—		ESA	TBD
—		ESA	TBD
—		ESA	TBD
—		ESA	TBD
—		ESA	TBD

No.	Pos.	Nation	Player
—		ESA	TBD
—		ESA	TBD
—		ESA	TBD
—		ESA	TBD
—		ESA	TBD

==== List of Under 17 Managers ====
List of LA Firpo Women's managers
Name	Years	Notes
(El Salvador) Carlos Martinez	2025-Present	TBD
(El Salvador) TBD	TBD(*)	TBD

=== World Cup players ===
Players that have played for Aguila in their career and played in a U-17 World Cup:

- (El Salvador) Kerin Torres (2025)

=== Women's team ===
The women's first team features several members of the El Salvador national women's team.

==== List of LA Firpo Women's Manager ====
As of November 2025

List of LA Firpo Women's managers
Name	Years	Notes
(El Salvador) Leonidas Montana	2022-Present	TBD
(El Salvador) TBD	TBD(*)	TBD

=== Current squad ===
As of: June, 2025 Note: Flags indicate national team as defined under FIFA eligibility rules; some limited exceptions apply. Players may hold more than one non-FIFA nationality.

No.	Pos.	Nation	Player
—		ESA	TBD
—		ESA	TBD
—		ESA	TBD
—		ESA	TBD
—		ESA	TBD

No.	Pos.	Nation	Player
—		ESA	TBD
—		ESA	TBD
—		ESA	TBD
—		ESA	TBD
—		ESA	TBD

=== In ===
Note: Flags indicate national team as defined under FIFA eligibility rules; some limited exceptions apply. Players may hold more than one non-FIFA nationality.

No.	Pos.	Nation	Player
—		ESA	TBD (From TBD)
—		ESA	TBD (From TBD)
—		ESA	TBD (From TBD)
—		ESA	TBD (From TBD)
—		ESA	TBD (From TBD)

No.	Pos.	Nation	Player
—		ESA	TBD (From TBD)
—		ESA	TBD (From TBD)
—		ESA	TBD (From TBD)

=== Out ===
Note: Flags indicate national team as defined under FIFA eligibility rules; some limited exceptions apply. Players may hold more than one non-FIFA nationality.

No.	Pos.	Nation	Player
—		ESA	Heylen de los Angeles Vasquez (To TBD)
—		ESA	Isela Elizabeth Garca (To TBD)
—		ESA	Stefany Alexandra Rivas (To TBD)
—		ESA	Josselyn Yamileth Mejia (To TBD)

No.	Pos.	Nation	Player
—		ESA	Maria Isabel Abrego (To TBD)
—		ESA	Andrea Michelle Hernandez (To TBD)
—		ESA	TBD (To TBD)
—		ESA	TBD (To TBD)
