= Alejandra Menjívar =

Salvadoran politician and LGBTQ rights activist

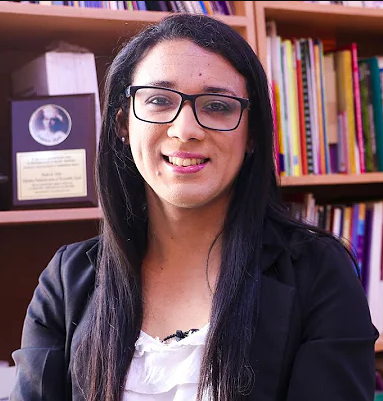
- Menjívar in 2021

Personal details
- Born: 1985 (age 40–41) Santa Ana, El Salvador
- Party: FMLN
- Education: Victory Institute; University of El Salvador
- Occupation: Politician; LGBTQ rights activist

Alejandra Menjívar Guadrón (born 1985) is a Salvadoran politician and LGBTQ rights activist. In 2021, she ran for the Central American Parliament, becoming the first transgender person to run for elected office in El Salvador's history.

== Biography ==
Born in 1985 in Santa Ana, El Salvador, Menjívar was raised by her mother and grandmother after her father was killed in action during the Salvadoran Civil War.

Between 2006 and 2008, she started to be involved with the Farabundo Martí National Liberation Front (FMLN) party.

She studied at the Central American School of LGBTQ Leadership of the Victory Institute in 2016 and at the University of El Salvador, where she studied sociology.

Menjívar joined the FMLN in 2008 and in 2020 became the party's National Secretary for Sexual and Gender Diversity. She was also involved with organizations such as the Positive Youth Network and the Aspidh Arcoíris Trans Association. She participated in the process of creating the government agenda of former President Mauricio Funes.

For the 2021 legislative and municipal elections, she ran as a candidate for the Central American Parliament for the FMLN, thus becoming the first Salvadoran trans person to run for elected office. During the campaign, she expressed support for issues such as a gender identity law, the decriminalization of abortion, same-sex marriage, and the rights of migrants and Afro-Salvadorans.

In June 2021, Menjívar was kidnapped while in Mexico and reappeared a few days later. She also announced that she had suffered violence during her abduction and that she would seek political asylum in Mexico, given the threats and attacks she had suffered in El Salvador. After that, she migrated to Canada.

== Views ==
Menjívar is a critic of the government of President Nayib Bukele. She is also an activist for LGBTQ rights, women's rights, rights of people with HIV, sexual and reproductive rights, environmental rights, and trade union rights.

== Personal life ==
She is also nicknamed Aleja.
