= Rafael Menjívar Larín =

Rafael Menjívar Larín (January 3, 1935 – August 7, 2000) was a Salvadoran economist and politician. An outspoken left-wing critical of the Somoza dictatorship, he was director of the University of El Salvador before being thrown into jail and forced abroad into exile.

== Early life and education ==
Born in Santa Ana, El Salvador, Larín was the son of a chauffeur and a housewife, and studied economic sciences in the University of El Salvador between 1956 and 1962. In 1963, at 28 years of age, he graduated as a doctor specialising in the agricultural economy, and almost immediately he was elected dean of the Faculty of Economy.

== Career ==
Between 1967 and 1969 he was general manager of the University. In 1969 he published the book, ''Reforma agraria en Guatemala, Bolivia y Cuba (The Agrarian Reformation in Guatemala, Bolivia and Cuba). During this time he travelled to Chile, where during his nine month stay he undertook academic investigation into Chilean agriculture and produced Reforma agraria chilena (UES, San Salvador, 1970).

By the end of the 1970s he was elected the director of the University of El Salvador, but on July 19, 1972, the Salvadoran Legislative Assembly deprived the university of its autonomy and it fell under National Army and Police and authority control, a highly controversial move which led to Menjívar Larín and several other high civil servants being imprisoned in their protest. Menjívar Larín was missing during three days in a clandestine cell of the National Police. He was later exiled to Nicaragua, but he was placed under arrest by the orders of dictator Anastasio Somoza Debayle. In October 1972 he was released and subsequently was sent to Costa Rica.

There in Costa Rica he founded the Central American School of Sociology in 1974, in company of other intellectuals of the region. He was also Secretary General of the Consejo Superior Universitario Centroamericano (CSUCA). That same year he joined the Fuerzas Populares de Liberación "Farabundo Martí", a left wing party in El Salvador and became acquainted with its leader Salvador Cayetano Carpio.

In January 1976 he travelled with his family to Mexico, where he was granted a scholarship by the Latin American Council of Social Sciences (CLACSO) to obtain a doctorate in political sciences, which he completed in 1979. During this period he wrote numerous books and papers including Acumulación originaria y desarrollo del capitalismo en El Salvador and Formación y lucha del proletariado industrial salvadoreño. At the beginning of 1978 he was named vice president of Latin American Studies in the Political Sciences faculty at the Universidad Nacional Autónoma de México. Along with the Salvadoran intellectuals, Rafael Guidos Béjar and Ernesto Richter he contributed to a more specific Central American field of study and chaired debates on agrarian sociology and theory of the state.

In 1980 he worked as a university professor at the Facultad Latinoamericana de Ciencias Sociales (FLACSO). However, in 1980 El Salvador went into political turmoil, and Menjívar Larín became increasingly involved in politics. He was appointed president of the External Commission of the Frente Democrático Revolucionario and was involved in important diplomatic work in favor of the Salvadoran insurgency in Mexico and the rest of Latin America and Europe. In 1981 the FDR moved to France, where diplomacy between the French and the Mexicans and the FMLN began. At the same time, he acted as political adviser to the leader of the FMLN, Salvador Cayetano Carpio, whilst in his spare time was active in the university at Sorbonne.

After the suicide of Carpio on April 12, 1983, which shook the FMLN party and Menjívar Larín, he retired from politics and rededicated himself to academic work. In May 1983 he was appointed Academic Director of director academic of Latin American FLACSO, a position he occupied until 1989. He then became a director in Costa Rica, and during his administration he worked extensively with many noted Central American intellectuals, and was active all over El Salvador, Guatemala, Honduras, the Dominican Republic and Cuba. He published over ten books on economics and sociology, and directed investigations into the Costa Rican economy and supported Costa Rican programs of micro-development and the increasing operation of smaller companies.

== Later years and death ==
In 1998 he retired from FLACSO to dedicate himself to his writing. In 1999, nevertheless, he was appotined director of a program of micro-enterprises of the International Labour Convention, but this too was to be short-lived, after being diagnosed with cancer several months later in August of that year. He would almost exactly a year after being diagnosed, succumbing to the disease on August 7, 2000 at the age of 65. He was buried in the Montesacro cemetery, of San Jose, Costa Rica. He was survived by his sons who have become noted academics in their own right including the writer and journalist Rafael Menjívar Ochoa and the sociologist and historian Mauritius Menjívar Ochoa.
