= Abraham Monterrosa =

Salvadoran footballer (born 1975)

Abrahám Monterrosa
Personal information
- Full name: José Abrahám Monterrosa Argumedo
- Date of birth: July 3, 1975 (age 51)
- Place of birth: La Libertad, El Salvador
- Position: Midfielder

Senior career*
Years	Team	Apps	(Gls)
1994–2001	Luis Ángel Firpo		
2002–2003	Águila		
2004–2006	Atlético Balboa		
2006	Isidro Metapán		

International career
1994	El Salvador U21		
1998	El Salvador	2	(0)
- * Club domestic league appearances and goals

José Abrahám Monterrosa Argumedo (born July 3, 1975, in El Salvador) is a retired Salvadoran football player.

== Club career ==
Nicknamed La Tortuga, he won several titles with C.D. Luis Ángel Firpo and won a silver medal with the El Salvador national team U21 at the Central American Games. Persisting injuries cut short his career. After retiring, he moved to work in the United States but returned to El Salvador but does not consider to take up a job in football again.

== International career ==
Monterrosa made his debut for El Salvador in a November 1998 friendly match against Mexico and has played only one more international, against Honduras in the same month, scoring no goals.
