= Kiril Dojčinovski =

Macedonian footballer (1943–2022)

Personal information
- Date of birth: 17 October 1943
- Place of birth: Skopje, Occupied Macedonia
- Date of death: 10 August 2022 (aged 78)
- Position: Defender

Youth career
- 1958–1963: Vardar

Senior career*
Years	Team	Apps	(Gls)
1963–1967	Vardar	106	(0)
1967–1974	Red Star Belgrade	190	(3)
1974–1975	Troyes	25	(3)
1975–1977	Paris FC	38	(0)
Total		359	(6)

International career
1968–1970	Yugoslavia	6	(0)

Managerial career
- 1989: El Salvador
- 1990: Vardar
- 1991–1993: Luis Ángel Firpo
- 1995–1996: LA Firpo
- 1998: El Salvador
- 1998: Iraklis
- 1999: Makedonija
- 2000: Pelister
- 2001: Municipal Limeño
- 2003: Bregalnica Delčevo
- 2004: Platense
- 2005–2006: Bregalnica Štip
- 2008: Vardar
- * Club domestic league appearances and goals

Kiril Dojčinovski (Macedonian: Кирил Дојчиновски; 17 October 1943 – 10 August 2022) was a Macedonian football player and manager who played as a defender.

== Club career ==
Dojčinovski started playing in the youth team of FK Vardar in 1958. He successfully made his way into the senior squad, and after a few seasons he made a transfer to Red Star Belgrade. During his club career he played for Vardar Skopje, Crvena Zvezda, Troyes and Paris FC. With Red Star, he won one Yugoslav championship and one cup.

== International career ==
Dojčinovski had earned caps for the cadet, youth, Olympic, and B Yugoslav national teams before debuting for the main senior national team.

He made his senior debut for Yugoslavia in an October 1968 FIFA World Cup qualification match against Spain and has earned a total of 6 caps, scoring no goals. His final international was a May 1970 friendly match against West Germany.

== Managerial career ==
Dojčinovski later became a manager and coached the El Salvador national football team on two occasions. He also coached several clubs from El Salvador, Greece and Macedonia.

== Personal life ==
In 2009, both of his legs were amputated due to complications from gangrene.

He died on 10 August 2022 at the age of 78.

== Honours ==
=== Player ===
Red Star Belgrade

- Yugoslav First League: 1967–68, 1968–69, 1969–70, 1972–73
- Yugoslav Cup: 1967–68, 1969–70, 1970–71
- Mitropa Cup: 1967–68
- Iberico Trophy Badajoz: 1971
- Trofeo Costa del Sol: 1973
- Trofeo Naranja: 1973
- UEFA Champions League: semi-finalist 1970–71; quarter-finalist 1973–74
- UEFA Cup Winners' Cup: quarter-finalist 1971–72

=== Coach ===
Luis Angel Firpo

- Primera: 1991–92, 1992–93; runner-up: 1995–96

== Notes ==
1. At the time of his birth, Skopje was occupied by the Axis-allied Kingdom of Bulgaria. Prior to that, it was part of the Vardar Banovina in the Kingdom of Yugoslavia.
