= Marlon Menjívar =

Salvadoran footballer (born 1965)

Personal information
- Full name: Marlon Menjívar Ernesto
- Date of birth: September 1, 1965 (age 61)
- Place of birth: El Salvador
- Position: Midfielder

Senior career*
Years	Team	Apps	(Gls)
1986–1987	Chalatenango		
1988–1997	Luis Ángel Firpo		

International career
1989–1996	El Salvador	16	(0)
- * Club domestic league appearances and goals

Marlon Menjívar Ernesto (born 1 September 1965) is a retired Salvadoran professional footballer.

== Club career ==
The moustached Menjívar was part of Luis Ángel Firpo's most successful team of all time, playing in midfield alongside Firpo greats as Leonel Cárcamo, Edgar Henríquez and Giovanni Trigueros and winning four league titles with them. He scored the winning (and only) goal in the 1991 championship final against C.D. Águila.

== International career ==
Menjívar made his debut for El Salvador in a March 1989 friendly match against Guatemala and has earned a total of 16 caps, scoring no goals. He has represented his country at the 1995 UNCAF Nations Cup and was a non-playing squad member at the 1996 CONCACAF Gold Cup.

His final international game was a December 1996 FIFA World Cup qualification match against Cuba.

== Personal life ==
Menjívar has a construction business and runs his own soccer academy in Maryland, United States. His daughter Zulia plays for Montgomery College Rockville and was called up for the El Salvador women U-20 team in 2011.
