= C.D. Santa Anita =

- Full name: Club Deportivo Santa Anita
- Nickname(s): El Huracán Bohemio; El equipo de la barriada alegre
- Dissolved: January 27, 1961; 64 years ago

Club Deportivo Santa Anita, commonly known as Santa Anita were a Salvadoran professional football club based in Santa Ana.

They competed in the Primera División de Fútbol Profesional between 1949 and 1961. Currently Defunct.

== Notable coaches ==
El Salvador:

- (El Salvador) Marcelo Estrada
