= Juan Masnik =

Uruguayan footballer and manager (1943–2021)

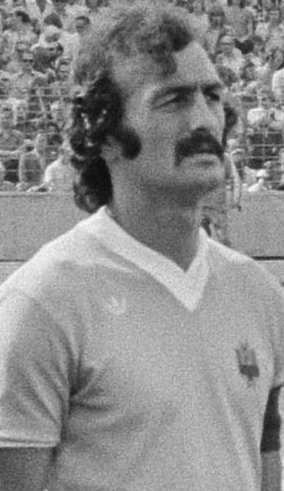
- Masnik with Uruguay in 1974

Personal information
- Full name: Juan Carlos Masnik Hornos
- Date of birth: 2 March 1943
- Place of birth: Soriano, Uruguay
- Date of death: 23 February 2021 (aged 77)
- Position: Defender

Senior career*
| Years | Team | Apps | (Gls) |
| 1965–1967 | Nacional | | |
| 1967 | New York Skyliners | | |
| 1968–1970 | Gimnasia y Esgrima La Plata | 88 | (6) |
| 1971–1974 | Nacional | | |
| 1975 | New York Cosmos | 6 | (0) |
| 1976–1978 | Universidad Católica | | |

International career
| 1967–1974 | Uruguay | 26 | (0) |

Managerial career
- 1984: Club Nacional de Football
- 1989–1990: L.A. Firpo
- 1991–1992: FAS
- 1993–1994: Atlético Marte
- 1995–1996: Alianza F.C.
- 1999: FAS
- * Club domestic league appearances and goals

Juan Carlos Masnik Hornos (2 March 1943 – 23 February 2021) was a Uruguayan football player and manager, who represented the Uruguay national team at the 1974 FIFA World Cup in Germany.

== Career ==
Masnik played for Club Nacional de Football and featured in the 1971 Intercontinental Cup. He played in Argentina for Gimnasia y Esgrima de La Plata where he scored 6 goals in 88 league games.

He also had two short stints in the United States. The first was in 1967 with the New York Skyliners of the United Soccer Association and in the second in 1975 with New York Cosmos of the North American Soccer League.

Masnik made 26 appearances for the Uruguay national team from 1967 to 1974.

== Death ==
Masnik died on 23 February 2021, aged 77.

== Honours ==
=== Manager ===
==== Club ====
Luis Ángel Firpo

- Primera División
  - Champion (1): 1990–91

Alianza

- Primera División
  - Champion (1): 1996-97

Alianza

- UNCAF Interclub Cup
  - Champion (1): 1997
