= Nildeson =

Brazilian-Salvadoran footballer (born 1968)

Personal information
- Full name: Nildeson da Silva Melo
- Date of birth: 29 October 1968 (age 58)
- Place of birth: Rio de Janeiro, Brazil
- Height: 1.77 m (5 ft 10 in)
- Position: Striker

Senior career*
Years	Team	Apps	(Gls)
1986–1989	Grêmio		
1989–1990	Luis Ángel Firpo		
1990–1991	Atlético Marte		
1991–1992	Luis Ángel Firpo		
1992–1993	Herediano		
1993–1994	Toluca	27	(12)
1994–1995	Correcaminos	23	(6)
1996–1997	Toros Neza	26	(20)
1998–1999	Luis Ángel Firpo		
2002	Chalatenango		
2003–2004	Águila		(4)
2004	Luis Ángel Firpo		
2004–2005	Atlético Balboa		(8)
Total		76	(50)

International career^{‡}
1997–2004	El Salvador	10	(3)
- * Club domestic league appearances and goals ‡ National team caps and goals as of 21 August 2011

Nildeson "Nenei" da Silva Melo (born 29 October 1968 in Rio de Janeiro, Brazil) is a retired Brazilian and naturalized Salvadoran football player, who played as a striker.

== Club career ==
He arrived in El Salvador in 1989 to play for Luis Ángel Firpo after a couple of seasons at home with Grêmio. He had a season at Atlético Marte in between two seasons with Firpo and he would go to Costa Rica to play for CS Herediano scored 21 goals in 1992.

=== Mexico ===
His success caught the attention of Mexican club Toluca of the Mexican Primera División that year. He would end up playing for various clubs in Mexico. In 1997, he would reach the finals with Toros Neza but end up losing the finals. While still at the books of Toros Neza, Nildeson was jailed and prosecuted by his former girlfriend over not paying up alimony.

=== Back in El Salvador ===
In 1998, he returned to El Salvador to have his second stint with Luis Ángel Firpo. He became a Salvadoran citizen and was able to represent El Salvador. He was later cut by Armando Contreras who had taken the position after Juan Ramón Paredes stepped down of the national team. He would later play for Chalatenango, FAS and Águila but the latter clubs dismissed him because of indiscipline and apparent drugs abuse. Then, he was give a chance by Atlético Balboa where he would eventually retire in 2005 after reaching the final of the 2004 Apertura. After a knee operation in January 2005 he was dismissed by Balboa citing he would not recover to get back to his former best.

== International career ==
After his naturalisation, Nildeson made his debut for El Salvador in an August 1997 FIFA World Cup qualification match against Costa Rica and has earned a total of 10 caps, scoring 3 goals. He has represented his adopted country in 6 FIFA World Cup qualification matches.

His final international game was a September 2004 World Cup qualification match against Jamaica.

=== International goals ===
Scores and results list El Salvador's goal tally first.

#	Date	Venue	Opponent	Score	Result	Competition
1	14 September 1997	Estadio Cuscatlán, San Salvador, El Salvador	Canada	1-0	4-1	1998 FIFA World Cup qualification
2	9 November 1997	Estadio Cuscatlán, San Salvador, El Salvador	Jamaica	1-0	2-2	1998 FIFA World Cup qualification
3	16 November 1997	Sullivan Stadium, Foxborough, Massachusetts, USA	United States	1-3	2-4	1998 FIFA World Cup qualification

== Personal life ==
Nildeson has four younger brothers who also play football: former Flamengo midfielder Nélio, Cruzeiro- and Brazilian World Cup defender Gilberto, Nilberto and Edmilson who both played in Honduras.
