= Leonel Cárcamo =

Salvadoran footballer (born 1965)

Personal information
- Full name: Leonel Cárcamo Batres
- Date of birth: May 3, 1965 (age 61)
- Place of birth: Usulután, El Salvador
- Position: Defender

Youth career
- 1975–1977: Los Toros y Rubí
- Oro y Plata
- 1984: Carrera F.C.

Senior career*
Years	Team	Apps	(Gls)
1985–2001	CD Luis Ángel Firpo		

International career
1988–2000	El Salvador	84	(0)

Managerial career
- 2006–2007: CD Luis Ángel Firpo
- 2009–2010: Santa Tecla FC
- 2010–2012: Alianza FC (assistant coach)
- 2011: Alianza FC (caretaker)
- 2012: Once Municipal
- 2012: CD Arcense
- 2014: CD Luis Ángel Firpo
- 2017–2019: Santa Tecla FC (reserves)
- 2019: Santa Tecla FC (caretaker)
- * Club domestic league appearances and goals

Leonel Cárcamo Batres (born May 5, 1965) is a retired Salvadoran football player.

== Club career ==
Cárcamo has played all of his professional career at hometown club Luis Ángel Firpo, becoming a club legend in the process. Snapped up by Firpo from lower league outfit Carrera when still in his teens, he won seven league titles in 17 years with the club. He scored the decisive penalty in the penalty shoot-out against Cojutepeque to hand Los Pamperos their first league title in 1989. He was part of the most successful team in the history of the club, lining up alongside players like Marlon Menjívar, Mauricio Cienfuegos, Raúl Díaz Arce and his longtime central defensive partner Giovanni Trigueros.

== International career ==
Cárcamo made his debut for El Salvador in 1988 and has amassed a total of 84 caps in 13 years, scoring no goals. He has represented his country in 27 FIFA World Cup qualification matches and played at the 1993 and 1997 UNCAF Nations Cups and at the 1996 and 1998 CONCACAF Gold Cups.

His final international game was a July 2000 friendly match in Los Angeles against Guatemala.

== Personal life ==
Cárcamo is married with Consuelo Madelín Sánchez and the couple have three children: Madelín, Leonel and Osvaldo.
