= Giovanni Trigueros =

Salvadoran footballer (born 1966)

Personal information
- Full name: Giovanni Trigueros Martínez
- Date of birth: 8 December 1966 (age 59)
- Place of birth: Ahuachapán, El Salvador
- Position: Defender

Youth career
- La Academia Barcelona

Senior career*
Years	Team	Apps	(Gls)
1988–1997	Luis Ángel Firpo		

International career
1988–1996	El Salvador	47	(1)

Managerial career
- 2012–2013: El Salvador U20 (assistant)
- 2013: El Salvador U17 (women)
- 2014: El Salvador (women)
- 2015: El Salvador U20 (assistant)
- 2015–2016: Once Municipal
- 2018: Luis Ángel Firpo
- 2018–2019: C.D. El Vencedor
- * Club domestic league appearances and goals

Giovanni Trigueros Martínez (born 8 December 1966) is a former Salvadoran professional footballer and currently manager.

== Club career ==
Trigueros played the majority of his career for Luis Ángel Firpo, with whom he won four league titles in 1989, 1991, 1992 and 1993. He formed a legendary central defensive pairing with Leonel Cárcamo in the national team and was part of the most successful team in the history of Luis Ángel Firpo, lining up alongside players like Marlon Menjívar, Mauricio Cienfuegos and Raúl Díaz Arce.

In March 2005, Trigueros was given a testimonial match, with veteran players of Luis Ángel Firpo and Once Municipal.

== International career ==
Trigueros made his debut for El Salvador in a March 1988 friendly match against Mexico and has earned a total of 47 caps, scoring 1 goal. He has represented his country in 19 FIFA World Cup qualification matches. He has also been captain in the national team.

His final international was a November 1996 friendly match against Mexico.

== Coaching career ==
In 2012, Trigueros signed as assistant coach of El Salvador national under-20 football team.

In 2014, Trigueros signed as coach of El Salvador women's national football team.

In 2015, Trigueros signed again as assistant coach of El Salvador national under-20 football team. In February 2015, Trigueros was fired due to budget cuts.

In June 2015, Trigueros signed as new coach of Once Municipal, replacing Marco Pineda. In February 2016, Trigueros was replaced by Sandra Escalante de Martínez.

In March 2018, Trigueros signed as new coach of Luis Ángel Firpo for the Clausura 2018 tournament, replacing Eraldo Correia. However, Trigueros suffered a severe administrative, economic and sports crisis with the club. In May 2018, Trigueros was replaced by assistant coach Jorge Calles.

In June 2018, Trigueros signed as new coach of CD El Vencedor.

== Playing statistics ==
Scores and results list El Salvador's goal tally first.

#	Date	Venue	Opponent	Score	Result	Competition
1	10 November 1996	Estadio Cuscatlán, San Salvador, El Salvador	Panama	3-2	3-2	1998 FIFA World Cup qualification

== Honours ==
=== Manager ===
El Vencedor

- Segunda División: Apertura 2018
