= Raúl Toro (footballer, born 1965) =

Chilean footballer

Personal information
- Full name: Raúl Benito Toro Basáez
- Date of birth: 19 July 1965 (age 61)
- Place of birth: Santiago, Chile
- Height: 1.73 m (5 ft 8 in)
- Positions: Forward; attacking midfielder

Youth career
- Unión Española
- 1980–1981: Santiago Morning
- 1982–1983: Universidad de Chile

Senior career*
Years	Team	Apps	(Gls)
1984	Universidad de Chile		
1985	Unión Española		
1986	Santiago Morning		
1986	Deportes Arica		
1987–1988	Universidad de Chile	70	(10)
1989	Deportes Arica		
1989–1990	Alianza		
1991–2000	Luis Ángel Firpo		
2001	Atlético Marte		

International career
1985	Chile U20		

Managerial career
- 2012: Luis Ángel Firpo (assistant)
- 2013: Marte Soyapango
- * Club domestic league appearances and goals

Raúl Benito Toro Basáez (born 19 July 1965) is a Chilean former professional footballer who played as a forward for clubs in Chile and El Salvador.

== Club career ==
A product of both Unión Española and Santiago Morning youth systems, he made his professional debut with Universidad de Chile thanks of the coach Hernán Carrasco. In Chile Toro also played for Unión Española, Santiago Morning and Deportes Arica. Along with Universidad de Chile, he took part in the 1989 season, where the club was relegated to the Segunda División.

In 1989, Toro moved to El Salvador and joined Alianza, winning the 1989–90 Primera División. Then he moved to Luis Ángel Firpo and won six titles until 2000, becoming one of the Chilean football players who have won more league titles in his career.

== International career ==
Following his debut with Universidad de Chile, Toro represented Chile at youth level in a tour for Singapore, France, Italy and Indonesia. At under-20 level, he represented Chile in the 1985 South American Championship in Paraguay.

== Personal life ==
After working as football manager and being honored with two farewell matches in El Salvador, he returned to his country of birth permanently in 2014.

== Honours ==
Alianza

- Primera División de Fútbol de El Salvador: 1989–90

Luis Ángel Firpo

- Primera División de Fútbol de El Salvador (6): 1990–91, 1991–92, 1992–93, 1997–98, 1999 Clausura, 2000 Clausura
