= Alianza FC (El Salvador) =

Association football club in El Salvador

Alianza
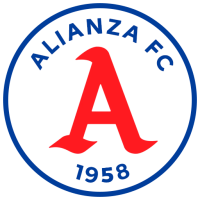
- Full name: Alianza Fútbol Club
- Nicknames: Los Paquidermos (The Bachyderms); Los Elefantes Blancos (The White Elephants); Los Albos (The Whites); El Mimado de la Capital (The Capital's Pampered Team); La Orquesta Alba (The White Orchestra)
- Short name: ALI
- Founded: 12 October 1958; 68 years ago (as Atlético La Constancia)
- Ground: Estadio Cuscatlán
- Capacity: 53,400
- Owner: Adolfo Salume
- Chairman: Gonzalo Sibrián
- Manager: Roberto Pompei
- League: Primera División
- 2026 Clausura: Overall: 3rd Playoffs: Qualified
- Website: https://alianzafc.com.sv/
Home colours	Away colours	Third colours

Alianza Fútbol Club, also known simply as Alianza, is a Salvadoran professional football club based in San Salvador. They compete in the Primera División, the top division of Salvadoran football.

Founded in 1958, Alianza was almost immediately successful, winning its first championships in the 1966 and 1967 Salvadoran seasons. Even more significantly, Alianza was the first Central American and Salvadoran club to win the CONCACAF Champions' Cup in 1967, and is currently one of only three Salvadoran teams to have done so.

== History ==
=== The beginning ===
Atlético La Constancia was formed in 1958 by a group of workers in San Salvador. Although small in terms of financial status, they were able to reach the Liga de Ascenso (second division) final in 1958. They lost 2–0 in a two legged series against Águila. The club, however, purchased a spot in the first division at the expense of Once Municipal. This enabled them to gain the sponsorship of the Intercontinental Hotel and its president, Peruvian Axel Hochkoeppler.

Because of Hochkoeppler's support, Alianza FC president Enrique Sol Meza decided to name the club Alianza FC in honor of Alianza Lima. Hernán Vivanco joined the club as the coach and began getting the players to play an exciting style of football. That style and a strong advertising campaign quickly won over the support of the population of San Salvador. Before long, Alianza was surpassing Juventud Olímpica as the nation's most popular club.

One of Alianza's greatest triumphs happened in 1966, when they defeated a Santos side that included the great Pelé. The win took place at the Estadio Nacional Flor Blanc, and featured the efforts of loaned Argentines Dante Juárez, Juan Verón and Santiago, all on loan at the time.

=== Orquesta Blanca ===
1966 was also the year that Alianza won its first tile. Due to the cohesion and speed with which Hernán Carrasco had the team playing, Alianza became known as La Orquesta Alba (the Dawn Orchestra). The team was made up of many great players, including Edgar "Pata Gorda" Morales, Roberto "La Burra" Rivas, Alberto "Pechuga" Villalta, Raúl "Araña" Magaña, Guido Alvarado, Salvador Mariona, Mario Monge, Luis "Cascarita" Tapia, Miguel "El Chueco" Hermosilla, Ricardo Sepúlveda and Jorge "El Conejo" Liévano.

The team won fifteen straight matches on their way to the league championship, where they defeated Águila 2–1. Goals were scored by Hermosilla and Mario Monge. In all, "La Orquesta Alba" outscored their opponents eighty-three to thirty-nine and won twenty of their thirty-six matches.

The club repeated as champions in 1967, defeating Sonsonate FC 5–1 in the finals. They then went on to become the first Salvadoran club to win the CONCACAF Champions' Cup, defeating Jong Colombia over a three-leg series. Alianza lost the first leg, but won the second to force a replay. They prevailed 5–3, with Tapia and Flores scoring twice each.

=== Decline and title drought ===
After the 1967 title, members of the Orquestra began retiring. Players like Brazilian internationals Camargo, Taneses and Nilton Rodarte, Peruvian international Fernando Alva, Uruguayan international Julio César "El Pocho" Cortés, Chilean international Hugo Ottensen came through the ranks. So too did domestic players including Miguel "La Mica" González, Herbert Machón, "Míchel" Cornejo, Armando Cortez Sandoval, Jaime "Samba" Saravia, Roberto "El Cuchillo" Guerra, Jaime "La Chelona" Rodríguez and Carlos "El Cacho" Meléndez. However, the 1970s were less successful than the 1960s.

They reached the playoff finals four times (1971, 1973, 1975–76, and 1978–79) but finished runner-up each time. Then, after a string of disappointing seasons, the club came out of the wilderness to challenge for the title in 1985. However, they would be runners-up again, losing 5–2 to city rivals Atlético Marte.

=== Title success ===
In 1986, the title drought finally ended. Ricardo Sepúlveda, a member of "The Orquesta Alba", returned to the club as a manager and led them to their third championship and first in twenty years. The championship match pitted Alianza against Águila, and it ended 0–0 after extra time. The game went to penalties, and Alianza won 3–1, with Carlos Reyes scoring the decisive goal. A corner had been turned.

The brilliance of Chilean Raúl Toro powered Alianza to a fourth title in 1989; he scored the winning goal in the final against Luis Ángel Firpo. 1993–94 saw a fifth crown, as the Uruguayan Gustavo Faral managed the club to a 2–1 championship win over FAS.

1997 saw Alianza win its second international championship, when they defeated Deportivo Saprissa from Costa Rica to win the UNCAF Club Championship. The management of technician Juan Masnik and the heroic efforts of players such as Horacio Lugo, Marcelo Bauza, Uruguayan Alejandro Curbelo and Adrián de la Cruz powered the team to two more titles soon after.

=== The Invincibles ===
Alianza went through the Apertura 2017 season undefeated, becoming the first Salvadoran side to achieve such a feat. Their 4–1 win over Santa Tecla in the final was the icing on the cake, and saw a double from Rodolfo Zelaya, plus strikes from league leading goalscorer Gustavo Guerreño, and midfielder Marvin Monterrosa.

== Honours ==
=== Domestic honours ===
- Primera División
  - Winners (19): 1965–66, 1966–67, 1986–87, 1989–90, 1993–94, 1996–97, Apertura 1998, Apertura 2001, Clausura 2004, Clausura 2011, Apertura 2015, Apertura 2017, Clausura 2018, Apertura 2019, Apertura 2020, Apertura 2021, Clausura 2022, Clausura 2024, 2025 Clausura

=== International honours ===
- CONCACAF Champions' Cup
  - Winners (1): 1967
- UNCAF Club Championship
  - Winners (1): 1997
  - Runners-up (1): 1980

=== Friendly tournament ===
- Copa Acción Cívica
  - 1966
- Copa Santa Ana
  - 1977
- Copa Roberto "Burra" Rivas
  - 2015

== Records ==
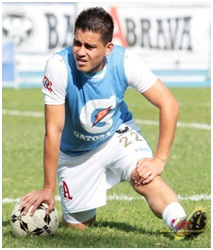
Rodolfo Zelaya is Alianza's record goalscorer with 172 goals.

Ramiro Carballo holds the record for most Alianza appearances, having played 442 first-team matches from 1997 to 2002 and 2005 to 2009. Juan Carlos Portillo comes second with 400 appearances. Óscar Navarro comes third with 389 appearances. The record for a goalkeeper is held by TBD, with 000 appearances. With 000 caps (000 while at the club), Rodolfo Zelaya is Alianza's most capped international player with 52 caps.

Rodolfo Zelaya is Alianza's all-time top goalscorer, with 172 goals. Six other players have also scored over 100 goals for Alianza: TBD (1953–64), TBD (1971–88), TBD (1958–66), TBD (1985–92), TBD (2009–current) and the previous goalscoring record-holder TBD (1994–2010). TBD holds the record for the most league goals scored in one season (48 in 2014–15). TBD's 49 goals in 58 matches was for decades the all-time highest tally in CONCACAF competition. The fastest goal in the history of the club (26 seconds) was scored by the Colombian Duvier Riascos on 15 September 2021 during a league match against Santa Tecla F.C.

- Alianza FC was the first Salvadoran team to win CONCACAF Champions' Cup.
- Alianza FC are the last Salvadoran team to win UNCAF Club Championship.
- Alianza FC are the last Salvadoran team to win an international competition, this being the UNCAF Club Championship in 1997.
- Alianza FC are the first and only team in Salvadoran League to win the domestic championship undefeated.

== Sponsorship ==
Companies that Alianza currently has sponsorship deals for 2026-2027 Seasons include:

- (Germany) Adidas – official kit suppliers
- (Mexico) Claro – official sponsors
- (United States) Pepsi – official sponsors
- (El Salvador) Indupalma S.A de C.V – official sponsors
- (El Salvador) Molsa – official sponsors
- (Croatia) Senator Group Casino – official sponsors
- (El Salvador) ALCASA S.A de C.V. – official sponsors
- (El Salvador) ABANK – official sponsors
- (United States) Mister Donut – official sponsors
- (United States) Taqueritos – official sponsors
- (El Salvador) Los Rinconcitos – official sponsors
- (El Salvador) Sistema Fedecredito – official sponsors
- (United States) Gatorade – official sponsors
- (El Salvador) Canal 4 – official sponsors

=== Kit makers ===
Years	Kit manufacturers
1956–1980	Nil shirt Maker
1992	(El Salvador) Clima
1995	(El Salvador) Galaxia
1996-1997	(Colombia) Torino
1998-1999	(Italy) Lanzera
2001-2005	(El Salvador) Milan
2006-2009	(El Salvador) AVIVA
2010-2014	(Italy) Lotto
2015	Nil shirt Maker
2016–2017	(Spain) Joma
2018–2026	(England) Umbro
2026–Present	(Germany) Adidas

== Stadium ==
Alianza Futbol Club has forged its entire history in the Estadio Nacional de la Flor Blanca (now Estadio Jorge "Mágico" González), in which they achieved three titles during the 1960s. However, it was damaged in the 2001 earthquakes and Alianza moved to the Estadio Cuscatlán, where they have kept playing to this day.

- Estadio Nacional de la Flor Blanca, San Salvador (1960–2001)
- Estadio Cuscatlán, San Salvador (2002–2012)
- Estadio Nacional de la Flor Blanca, San Salvador (2013)
- Estadio Cuscatlán, San Salvador (2013–2014)
- Estadio Nacional de la Flor Blanca, San Salvador (2014)
- Estadio Cuscatlán, San Salvador (2015–present)
- Estadio Anna Mercedes Campos, Sonsonate (2023–2024) As punishment for the Estadio Cuscatlán crowd crush, Alianza was barred from playing at the Estadio Cuscatlán for nine months. The club played the entire 2023 Apertura and parts of 2024 Clausura in front

=== Estadio Cuscatlán crowd crush ===
In 2023, during a game between Alianza F.C. and C.D. FAS in the Primera División de Fútbol de El Salvador an incident occurred which resulted in a crowd crush of fans in the stadium.

According to reports, fans had been sold fake tickets for the game and angry fans attempted to pull down the barricades at the stadiums at the entrance. Twelve people were killed and dozens of others injured.

== Players ==
=== Current squad ===
As of 21 August 2026

Note: Flags indicate national team as defined under FIFA eligibility rules; some limited exceptions apply. Players may hold more than one non-FIFA nationality.

No.	Pos.	Nation	Player
1	GK	ESA	Danilo Joya
3	DF	ESA	Julio Sibrian (on loan from Águila)
4	DF	GUA	Jairo Soriano
5	DF	GUA	Jafet Soriano
6	MF	ESA	Narciso Orellana
7	FW	URU	Matias Mier
8	MF	ESA	Harold Osorio
9	FW	BRA	Gustavo Souza
10	MF	ESA	Leonardo Menjívar
11	FW	ESA	Juan Carlos Portillo
13	GK	ESA	Mario González
14	MF	COL	William Parra
15	DF	ESA	William Flores
16	DF	ESA	Henry Romero (captain)
17	FW	ESA	Francis Castillo

No.	Pos.	Nation	Player
18	FW	ARG	José Barreto
19	DF	ESA	Nelson Rodriguez
20	DF	ESA	Alejandro Henriquez
21	DF	ESA	Bryan Tamacas
23	DF	ARG	Juan Cruz Monteagudo
24	MF	ESA	Moris Aguirre
25	GK	ESA	Rodrigo Lazo
26	FW	ESA	Noel Rivera
27	MF	ESA	Diego Bigueur
29	DF	ESA	Emerson Hernández
30	FW	ESA	Eduardo Rivas
36	GK	ESA	Daniel Franco
45	FW	ESA	Luis Tobar
56	FW	ESA	David Leon

=== Players with dual citizenship ===
- (El Salvador) (Honduras) Henry Romero
- (El Salvador) (United States) (Nicaragua) Francis Castillo
- (El Salvador) (Guatemala) Jairo Soriano
- (El Salvador) (Guatemala) Jafet Soriano

=== Out on loan ===
Note: Flags indicate national team as defined under FIFA eligibility rules; some limited exceptions apply. Players may hold more than one non-FIFA nationality.

No.	Pos.	Nation	Player

=== In ===
Note: Flags indicate national team as defined under FIFA eligibility rules; some limited exceptions apply. Players may hold more than one non-FIFA nationality.

No.	Pos.	Nation	Player
—	MF	URU	Matías Mier (From Zacatecoluca)
—	DF	ESA	Bryan Tamacas (From Hércules)
—		ESA	Nelson Rodriguez (From CT United FC)
—	GK	ESA	Danilo Joya (From Cacahuatique)
—		ESA	Willian Flores (From Zacatecoluca)
—		ESA	Julio Sibrián (Loaned From Aguila)

No.	Pos.	Nation	Player
—		ESA	Jairo Soriano (From Aurora)
—		ESA	Jafet Soriano (From Aurora)
—		ARG	Juan Cruz Monteagudo (From Defensores de Belgrano)
—		ARG	José Barreto (From Quilmes)
—		COL	William Parra (From TBD)
—		ESA	Andres Rivas (From TBD)

=== Out ===
Note: Flags indicate national team as defined under FIFA eligibility rules; some limited exceptions apply. Players may hold more than one non-FIFA nationality.

No.	Pos.	Nation	Player
—	GK	ESA	Cristopher Rauda (To Platense)
—	MF	COL	Andres Bello (To Platense)
—	DF	ESA	Diego Lemus (To Nacional FC)
—	DF	ESA	Mario Jacobo (To Isidro Metapan)
—	DF	ESA	Jonathan Jiménez (To LA Firpo)
—	DF	ESA	Juan Barahona (To INCA-Aruba)
—	MF	ESA	Christopher Guardado (To Inter Santa Tecla)

No.	Pos.	Nation	Player
—	DF	ARG	Matías Steib (Loan ended returned to Managua)
—	FW	ESA	Michell Mercado (To LA Firpo)
—	MF	ESA	Óscar Rodríguez (To Aguila)
—	MF	ESA	Allan Ocón (To TBD)
—	MF	ESA	Enrico Hernández (To TBD)
—	DF	ESA	William Canales (To Cachuatique)
—	DF	COL	Marlon Viafara (To TBD)

=== Coaching staff ===
As of October 10, 2026

Position	Staff
Manager	(Argentina) Diego Vásquez *
Assistant Manager	(Argentina) Franco Colarte *
Reserve Manager	(El Salvador) Luis Kalimba Sosa *
Under 17 Manager	(El Salvador) Nelson Rojas *
Ladies team Manager	(El Salvador) Edwin Deras *
Goalkeeper Coach	(El Salvador) Schafik Chávez *
Team Physical Trainer	(El Salvador) Franisco Hurtado
Fitness Coach	(Honduras) Jair Aragón *
Team Doctor	(El Salvador) Luis Enrique Merlos *
Knesliogiocal	(El Salvador) Omar Isais Flores
Utility	(El Salvador) Fernando Rivera & Ronald Escobar *
Director of Sports	(Honduras) Erlin Lagos *

=== Management ===
As of May 13, 2026

Position	Staff
Owner	(El Salvador) Asociación de Empresa Adolfo Salume
President	(El Salvador) Gonzalo Sibrian *
Vice President	(El Salvador) Adolfo Salume jr *
Secretary	(El Salvador) Oscar Hernandez *
Deputy Secretary	(El Salvador) Alexander Suriano *
Treasurer	(El Salvador) Oscar Ramos
General Director	(El Salvador) Lisandro Pohl
Director of Communications and Marketing	(El Salvador) Carmen Vides
Financial Manager	(El Salvador) Noemi Cordova de Valencia
Press Officer	(El Salvador) Jose Chavez
Administrative assistant	(El Salvador) Blanca Crisol
Assistant Youth divisions	(El Salvador) Dalila Garces
Social Media	(El Salvador) David Quezada
Internal analyst	(El Salvador) Fabrizio Castro
Video Analysts	(El Salvador) Rene Rosales
Sports Director	(Honduras) Erlin Lagos

== Notable players ==
=== Notable players ===
Below are the notable former and current players who have represented Alianza in Primera Division and international competition since the club's foundation in 1958. To appear in the section below, a player must have played in at least 100 official matches for the club, a list of every Alianza player who has been called up by their national team.

- (El Salvador) Joaquin Canales
- (El Salvador) Misael Alfaro
- (El Salvador) Ramiro Carballo
- (El Salvador) Raúl Magaña
- (El Salvador) Salvador Mariona
- (El Salvador) José Quintanilla
- (El Salvador) Roberto Rivas
- (El Salvador) Jaime Rodríguez
- (El Salvador) Adonay Martínez
- (El Salvador) Rodolfo Zelaya
- (Argentina) Horacio Lugo (1996–1997, 2000)
- (Chile) Luis Hernán Álvarez (1967)
- (Chile) Ricardo Sepúlveda (1965–1968)
- (Chile) Adolfo Olivares (1973)
- (Gabon) Didier Ovono (2005)
- (Panama) Luis Ernesto Tapia (1963–1970)
- (Uruguay) Julio César Cortés (1974–1975)
- (Uruguay) Alejandro Curbelo (2000, 2003–2004)

=== Team captains ===
Years	Name	Nation
1966–1967	Alberto Villalta (1947 – 2017)	El Salvador
1968–69	Salvador Mariona	El Salvador
1970	Guido Alvarado	Costa Rica
1975	Victor Manuel Valencia	El Salvador
1978	Roberto Guerra	El Salvador
1979–1981	Abilio Martinez	El Salvador
1986–1990	Julio Palacios Lozano	El Salvador
1993–1995	Joaquín Canales	El Salvador
1996–1998	Milton Melendez	El Salvador
2001	Adonai Martínez	El Salvador
2004	Mario Elias Guevara	El Salvador
2007, 2009	Ramiro Carballo	El Salvador
2008	Victor Velasquez	El Salvador
2009	Ramón Sánchez	El Salvador
2010	TBD	El Salvador
2011–2013	Marcelo Messias	El Salvador; Brazil
2014	Edwin Martínez	El Salvador
2015	Ramón Martínez de Paz	El Salvador
2017–2018	Rodolfo Zelaya	El Salvador
2018–2024	Marvin Monterrosa	El Salvador
2025–Present	Henry Romero	El Salvador

=== Retired numbers ===
2 – (El Salvador) Roberto Rivas, defender (1960–1970)

22 – (El Salvador) Rodolfo Zelaya, forward (2008-2025)

== Presidential history ==
Alianza have had numerous presidents over the course of their history, some of which have been the owners of the club; others have been honorary presidents. Here is a complete list of them.

Name	Years
(Peru) Axel Hochkoeppler	1957–59
(El Salvador) Enrique Sol Meza	1959-TBD
(El Salvador) Mauricio Salaverría Cáceres	1971-1972
(El Salvador) Ricardo Sol Meza	1966
(El Salvador) Ernesto Muyshondt Parker	TBA
(El Salvador) Vicente Sol Bang	1972-1973
(Spain) Juan Grané	TBA

Name	Years
(El Salvador) Alejandro Hutt	TBA
(El Salvador) Ricardo Simán	TBA
(El Salvador) Luis Ohrlich	TBA
(El Salvador) Fernando Calvo	TBA
(El Salvador) Ronald Calvo	TBA
(El Salvador) Miguel Pinto	TBA
(El Salvador) Rafael Rengifo	TBA

Name	Years
(El Salvador) Ricardo Balzaretti	TBA
(El Salvador) Oscar Antonio Rodriguez	1992–2001
(El Salvador) Ricardo Padilla	2001–2005
(El Salvador) Salvador Mariona	2005–2007
(El Salvador) Lisandro Pohl	2008–2018
(El Salvador) Adolfo Salume	2018–2020
(El Salvador) Pedro David Hernández	2020–2023
(El Salvador) Gonzalo Sibrian	2023–present

== Notable managers ==
The most successful all-time manager is Chilean Hernán Carrasco, who won four championships during his two tenures with Alianza FC (1966–67, 1989–92). The list of honours includes three Primera División titles (1965–66, 1966–67, 1989–90) and one CONCACAF Champions' Cup (1967).

Uruguayan Juan Masnik was another notable manager with two titles won with Alianza, one Primera División championships (1996–97) and one UNCAF Club Championship (1997).

Chilean Ricardo Sepúlveda and Uruguayan Rubén Alonso both had outstanding careers as players for Alianza, and are the only two to win a title both as a player and coach. Sepulveda won the 1986–87, while Alonso won the Apertura 1998 and Apertura 2015, which was the most recent title victory for both men.

Gustavo Faral won the 1993–94 championship, becoming the first Uruguayan and the first of three Uruguayans to win a title with Alianza.

Ramón Paredes become the first Salvadoran coach to win a title as coach of Alianza, which he did in the 2001 Apertura title.

Uruguayan Juan Martín Mujica led the team to the 2004 Clausura title.

Under the coaching of Roberto Gamarra, Alianza won the Clausura 2011.

Jorge Humberto Rodriguez helped Alianza win the 2017 Apertura title and also achieve the distinction of being the first team to go the entire season undefeated.

Milton Meléndez directed five finals (four of these in a row) during 2016 until 2022, culminating with three victories and two defeats. He became the third in the list of those who have been champions as a player and as a coach.

== Other departments ==
=== Football ===
==== Reserve team ====
The reserve team serves mainly as the final stepping stone for promising young players under the age of 21 before being promoted to the main team. The team played in the Primera División Reserves, their greatest successes were winning the Reserve championships in Clausura 2017, Apertura 2017, Clausura 2019, Apertura 2021 and Clausura 2024.

Alianza "B". 's youth squad plays in the twelve-team Primera División Reserves (El Salvador). Current members of the squad are:

Note: Flags indicate national team as defined under FIFA eligibility rules; some limited exceptions apply. Players may hold more than one non-FIFA nationality.

No.	Pos.	Nation	Player
32	MF	ESA	Elías Rivas
33	DF	ESA	Geovany López
34	DF	ESA	Alexis Montes
35	MF	ESA	Luis Rivera
36	DF	ESA	Marvin Sandoval
37	DF	ESA	Misael Valencia
38	MF	ESA	Josué Pacheco
39	MF	ESA	José Portillo
40	MF	ESA	Jason Marroquín
41	MF	ESA	Éver Guzmán

No.	Pos.	Nation	Player
42	DF	ESA	Emmanuel Flores
43	DF	ESA	Julio César Huezo
44	FW	ESA	Emerson Mauricio
45	FW	ESA	Diego Sánchez
46	MF	ESA	Wilian Flores
47	MF	ESA	Julio César Campos
48	MF	ESA	Marcelo Díaz
50	MF	ESA	Jahaziel Olivares
53	GK	ESA	Cristian Rivera

==== Junior teams ====
The youth team (under 17 and under 15) has produced some of El Salvador's top football players, including TBD and TBD. They are currently coached by Nelson Rojas.

Name	Years	Honours
(El Salvador) TBD	2014-2018	N/A
(El Salvador) Guillermo Figueroa	2019	N/A
(El Salvador) Juan Carlos Serrano	2018-2019	Apertura 2019
Hiatus	2019-2023	N/A
(El Salvador) TBD	2023-TBD	N/A
(El Salvador) Nelson Rojas	TBD-2025	N/A (TBD)
(El Salvador) Nelson Saul Mauricio	2025-Present	1 Sub 17 (TBD Apertura)

=== World Cup players ===
Players that have played for Álianza in their career and played in a U-17 World Cup:

- (El Salvador) Luis Tobar (2025)
- (El Salvador) Esteban Hernandez (2025)
- (El Salvador) Emerson Guardado (2025)

==== Women's team ====
The women's first team, which is led by head coach Edwin Deras, features several members of the El Salvador national ladies team including TBD (who won golden boot 42 goals). Alianza Woman plays in the Primera División Femenina. Their greatest successes were winning the 2017 Apertura, 2018 Clausura, 2018 Apertura, 2019 Apertura, 2020 Apertura, 2021 Apertura, 2023 Apertura, 2024 Clausura, 2024 Apertura titles. []

Name	Years	Honours
(El Salvador) Herbert Avilés	2016-2018	3 Liga Femenina (2017 Apertura, 2018 Clausura, 2018 Apertura)
(El Salvador) Debbie Gomez	2018-2019	1 Liga Femenina (2019 Apertura)
(El Salvador) Luis Sosa	2020-2022	2 Liga Femenina (2020 Apertura, 2021 Apertura)
(El Salvador) Edwin Deras	2023-2023	1 Liga Femenina (2023 Apertura)
(El Salvador) Cristian Zañas	2024-Present	3 Liga Femenina (2024 Clausura, 2024 Apertura, 2025 Clausura)
