= List of Primera División de El Salvador coaches (1926–1998) =

The following is a list of Primera División de Fútbol Profesional coaches — only including lists of current coaches

== Achievements ==
The following table shows the Primera Division head coaches that have won the Primera division.

Coach	Primera Division title	Clubs won title with it
(El Salvador) Conrado Miranda	6 (1955, 1956, 1957, 1959,1975–76, 1976–77,)	2 (TBD)
(Chile) Hernán Carrasco	6 (1965–66, 1966–67, 1969, 1970, 1987-88, 1989–90)	3 (1965–66, 1966–67, 1989–90; 1969, 1970;1987-88)
(El Salvador) Victor Manuel Ochoa	4 (1951–52, 1953–54, 1963–1964, 1964)	2 (1951–52, 1953–54; 1963–1964, 1964)
(El Salvador) Armando Contreras Palma	3 (1955, 1955–56, 1956–57)	1 (1955, 1955–56, 1956–57)
(Argentina) Juan Quarterone	3 (1973,1974-75, 1984 )	3 (1973,1974-75, 1984)
(El Salvador) Juan Francisco Barraza	3 (1972, 1981, 1983)	3 (1972, 1983; 1981)
TBD	0 (1996, 1997, 2011, 2012, 2014)	3 (1997, 2010, 2011)
TBD	0 (1996, 1997, 2011, 2012, 2014)	3 (1997, 2010, 2011)
TBD	0 (1996, 1997, 2011, 2012, 2014)	3 (1997, 2010, 2011)
(Uruguay) Juan Masnik	2 (1990–91, 1996–97)	2 (1990–91;1996–97)
(Uruguay) Saúl Rivero	2 (1994–95, 1995–96)	1 (1994–95, 1995–96)
(Chile) Julio Escobar	2 (1988–89, 1997-98)	1 (1988–89, 1997-98)
(North Macedonia) Kiril Dojčinovski	2 (1991–92, 1992–93)	1 (1991–92, 1992–93)
TBD	0 (1996, 1997, 2011, 2012, 2014)	3 (1997, 2010, 2011)
TBD	0 (1996, 1997, 2011, 2012, 2014)	3 (1997, 2010, 2011)
TBD	0 (1996, 1997, 2011, 2012, 2014)	3 (1997, 2010, 2011)

== List of all-time coaches ==
The list of coaches includes everyone who has coached a club while they were in the Primera division, whether in a permanent or temporary role. Interim coaches are listed only when they managed the team for at least one match in that period.

Name	Nationality	Club	From	Until
TBD		TBD	2017	2018
TBD		ADET	2017	2018
Marcus Rojas	Costa Rica	ADLER	1968	1971
Gregorio Bundio	Argentina	ADLER	2017	2018
TBD		ADLER	2017	2018
Ovidio Mendez	El Salvador	Agave Fc	1982	1982
Conrado Miranda	El Salvador	Aguila	1959	1960
Conrado Miranda	El Salvador	Aguila	1968	1970
Alfredo Ruano	El Salvador	Aguila	1969	1969
TBD		Aguila	2017	2018
TBD		Alacranes	2017	2018
Jose Santacolomba	Argentina	Alianza	1970	1971
TBD		Alianza	2017	2018
TBD		Alianza	2017	2018
TBD		Alianza	2017	2018
Jorge Tupinambá dos Santo	Brazil	ANTEL	1975	1975
Ricardo Tomasino	El Salvador	ANTEL	1975	1976
TBD		Apaneca	2017	April 1994
TBD		Asturias Municipal	2017	2018
TBD		Atlante	2017	2018
Marcelo Estrada	El Salvador	Atlante	1965	1965
Gregorio Bundio	Argentina	Atlante	2017	2018
Jose Santacolomba	Argentina	Atletico Marte	1964	1964
Isias Choto	El Salvador	Atletico Marte	1965	1965
TBD		Atletico Marte	2017	2018
TBD		Club Deportivo 33	2017	2018
TBD		Chalatenango	2017	2018
TBD		Chinameca	2017	2018
Raul Corcio Zavaleta	El Salvador	Cojutepeque	1986	1987
TBD		Cojutepeque	1987	1994
TBD		Cuscatleco	2017	2018
TBD		Dragon	2017	2018
TBD		El Roble	1994	1997
TBD		El Roble	1994	1997
TBD		El Roble	1994	1997
TBD		El Roble	1994	1997
TBD		España	2017	2018
Eduardo Mera	El Salvador	Excélsior	1970	1971
TBD		Excélsior	2017	2018
TBD		FAS	2017	2018
TBD		Ferrocarril	2017	2018
TBD		Fuerte Aguilares	1976	1977
TBD		Fuerte San Francisco	1990	1992
Armando Hernandez	El Salvador	Fuerte San Francisco	1991	1991
TBD		Gatos de Monterrey	1963	1964
TBD		H 13	2017	2018
TBD		Hércules	2017	2018
Jesus Cardonna	El Salvador	Independiente	TBD	TBD
TBD		Independiente	2017	2018
TBD		Juventud Olímpica	2017	2018
TBD		Leones	2017	2018
TBD		Libertad	2017	2018
TBD		C.D. Municipal Limeno	2017	2018
Jose Mario Martinez	El Salvador	LA Firpo	1984	1984
TBD		LA Firpo	2017	2018
TBD		Maya	2017	2018
Conrado Miranda	El Salvador	Metapan FC	1987	1987
TBD		Metapan FC	2017	2018
TBD		Metapan FC	2017	2018
TBD		Nequieo	2017	2018
Gregorio Bundio	(Argentina)	NEIN	1974	1974
Ricardo Tomasino	(El Salvador)	NEIN	1974	1975
Victor Manuel Ochoa	(El Salvador)	NEIN	1975	1975
Luis Grill Prieto	(Argentina) (Chile)	NEIN	1975	1975
TBD		Once Lobos	2017	2018
Rodolfo Chofo Lea	El Salvador	Once Municipal	1977	1977
TBD		Once Municipal	2017	2018
TBD		Platense	1975	1980
TBD		Quequeisque	2017	2018
Miguel Chincuya Deras	El Salvador	Santa Anita	1962	1962
TBD		Santa Anita	2017	2018
Juan Merlos	El Salvador	Santiagueño	1978	1982
TBD		Santiagueño	1978	1979
Arnaldo da Silva	Brazil	Sonsonate	1966	1968
Jaime Hermozabal/Hormozabal	Chile Paraguay	Sonsonate	1971	1971
TBD		Sonsonate	2017	2018
TBD		Soyapango FC	1986	1986
TBD		Telecomunicaciones	1961	1962
TBD		Tapachulteca	1975	1975
TBD		UCA	2017	2018
TBD		UES	2017	2018
