= List of Salvadoran league top scorers =

The following article contains a year-by-year list and statistics of football topscorers in Primera Division (El Salvador First Division) from 1948 to 1997.

== List of El Salvador Football League Top Scorers ==
Season	Nationality	Top Scorer	Club	Goals
1948–49	SLV	Eduardo Pineda	FAS	00
1950–51	SLV	TBD	TBD	00
1951–52	SLV	TBD	TBD	00
1952–53	SLV	TBD	TBD	00
1953–54	SLV	TBD	TBD	00
1955	SLV	Juan Francisco Barraza	Dragon	11
1955–56	SLV	TBD	TBD	00
1956–57	SLV	TBD	TBD	00
1957–58	ARG	Héctor Dadeiro	FAS	22
1959	ARG	Omar Muraco	FAS	26
1960–61	SLV	TBD	TBD	00
1961–62	SLV	Mario Monge	FAS	16
1962	SLV	TBD	TBD	00
1963–64	SLV	Salvador Zuleta	Aguila	00
1964	SLV	TBD	TBD	00
1965-66	SLV	Pipo Rodríguez	Universidad	23
	PAN	Luis Ernesto Tapia	Alianza F.C.	23
1966-67	PAN	Luis Ernesto Tapia	Alianza F.C.	25
1967-68	BRA	Odir Jacques	Alianza F.C.	30
1969	BRA	Elenilson Franco	Sonsonate	31
1970	BRA	Helio Rodríguez	Universidad	29
1971	BRA	José Taneses	Alianza F.C.	27
1972	SLV	David Cabrera	C.D. FAS	15
1973	BRA	Helio Rodríguez	Juventud Olímpica	17
1974-75	SLV	Sergio Méndez	Atlético Marte	25
1975-76	SLV	Luis Ramírez Zapata	Aguila	24
1976-77	SLV	Luis Ramírez Zapata	Aguila	00
1977-78	SLV	Norberto Huezo	Atletico Marte	21
1978-79	BRA	Alan Marcos de Queiroz (Marquinho)	Aguila	23
1979-80	SLV	Wilfredo Huezo	Atletico Marte	13
1980-81	SLV	Silvio Aquino	Alianza	19
	SLV	Joaquin Ventura	Santiagueño	19
1981	SLV	David Arnoldo Cabrera	FAS	20
1982	SLV	Óscar Gustavo “Lotario” Guerrero	Independiente F.C.	19
1983	SLV	David Arnoldo Cabrera	FAS	16
1984	SLV	Ever Hernández	FAS	13
1985	SLV	José María Rivas	Atletico Marte	11
1986-87	BRA	Ned Barbosa	Aguila	14
1987-88	URU	Ruben Alonso	Alianza F.C.	15
1988-89	SLV	Hugo Ventura	Cojutepeque F.C.	17
1989-90	BRA	Toninho dos Santos	LA Firpo	25
1990-91	SLV	Raul Diaz Arce	Dragon	21
1991-92	ARG	Hugo Coria	Aguila	22
1992-93	BRA	Rodinei Martins	Atletico Marte	24
1993-94	SLV	Raul Diaz Arce	LA Firpo	24
1994-95	SLV	Raul Diaz Arce	LA Firpo	25
1995–96	SLV	Raul Diaz Arce	LA Firpo	25
1996–97	URU	Jorge Garay	Aguila	21
1997–98	SLV	Alfredo ‘Chelito’ Pérez	LA Firpo	14
