= List of head coaches of Alianza F.C. =

Alianza F.C. has had a total of 50 coaches in its history.

The first coach was Gregorio Bundio, who he was at the club from 1959 until 1960.

The majority of coaches Alianza have had have been Salvadorians. Of the 50 coaches to have managed Alianza, 19 have been Salvadorians and 31 foreigners. In some cases, the Salvadorian coaches have been former players of the club that agreed to take charge after the sacking of the regular coach that season.

The main nationalities of the coaches of Alianza barring Salvadorians have been Uruguayan (9 coaches), Argentina (8 coaches), Colombians (5 coaches) and Chilean (5 coaches). The club has also had two Serbian coaches, 2 Brazilians, 2 Spanish, a Mexican, an Italian, a Paraguayan.

== Managers ==
- Only first-team competitive matches are counted.
- Statistics are updated up to 8 February 2024.

Table key

- Player-coach (team player that assumed simultaneously the role of coach)
- Caretaker coach (coach who assumed temporarily the job in the absence of the incumbent head coach or until a new head coach was hired)

List of Head Coaches of Alianza F.C. from when the club was formed:

Name	Nat.	From	To	Honours	Notes
Gregorio Bundio	(Argentina)	1959	1960		
TBD	(Argentina)	1961	1962		
Raúl "Che" Álvarez	(Argentina)	1963	1963		
TBD	(Argentina)	1964	1965		
Emilio Guardado	(El Salvador)	TBD	TBD		
Hernán Carrasco Vivanco	(Chile)	1966	1967	2 Primera División (1965–66, 1966–67), 1 (1967 CONCACAF Champions' Cup)	
Conrado Miranda	(El Salvador)	1967	1967		
José Giuseppe Rossini	(Italy)	1969	1969		
Manuel "Cuíco" Gómez	(El Salvador)	1969	1969		
TBD	(Argentina)	1970	1971		
Conrado Miranda	(Argentina)	1971	1971		
Salvador Mariona	(El Salvador)	1972	April 1972		
Victor Manuel Ochoa "Pipe"	(El Salvador)	May 1972	1972		
Salvador Mariona	(El Salvador)	1973	1973		
Hernán Carrasco Vivanco	(Chile)	December 1973	February 1974		
Salvador Mariona/Raúl Magaña/Francisco Zamora (Interim)	(El Salvador)	February 1974	February 1974		
Néstor Valdez Moraga	(Chile)	February 1974	December 1974		
Ricardo Sepúlveda	(Chile)	January 1975	September 1975		
Mario Rey	(Argentina)	September 1975	1976		
TBD	(Argentina)	1977	1978		
Victor Manuel Ochoa "Pipe"	(El Salvador)	1978	1979		
Raúl Magaña	(El Salvador)	1980	1980		
TBD	(Argentina)	1981	1981		
Francisco Zamora	(El Salvador) (Honduras)	1982	1982		
Salvador Mariona	(El Salvador)	1983	1983		
Ricardo Tomasino	(El Salvador)	TBD	TBD		
Mauricio Ernesto González	(El Salvador)	TBD	TBD		
Juan Francisco Barraza	(El Salvador)	TBD	TBD		
Alfredo "Baiza" Ruano	(El Salvador)	TBD	TBD		
Armando Contreras Palma	(El Salvador)	TBD	TBD		
TBD	(El Salvador)	1984	1984		
Ricardo Mena Laguán	(El Salvador)	TBD	1985		
Juan Quarterone	(Argentina)	1985	1986		
Ricardo Sepúlveda	(Chile)	1986	1987	1 Primera División (1986-1987)	
Helio Rodríguez dos santos	(Brazil)	1988	1988		
Francisco Zamora	(El Salvador) (Honduras)	1988	1989		
Hernán Carrasco Vivanco	(Chile)	1989	1990	1 Primera División (1989)	
José Estanislao Malinowski	(Uruguay)	1991	1992		
Hernán Carrasco Vivanco	(Chile)	1991	1992		
Helio Rodriguez dos Santos	(Brazil)	1993	1994		
Nilton Rodarte	(Brazil)	1993	1994		
Gustavo Faral	(Uruguay)	1993	1994	1 Primera División (1993-1994)	
Gregorio Bundio	(Argentina)	February 1995	February 1995		
Hernán Carrasco Vivanco	(Chile)	1995	November 1995		
Jorge Aude	(Uruguay)	November 1995	June 1996		
Didier Castro	(Costa Rica)	June 1996	June 1996		1 game
Juan Masnik	(Uruguay)	August 1996	November 1997	1 Primera División (1996-1997),1 UNCAF Club Championship (1997).	
Jose Mario Figueroa	(Uruguay)	November 1997	November 1997		1 game
Jose Mario Figueroa	(Uruguay)	November 1997	July 1998		
Rubén Alonso	(Uruguay)	July 1998	April 1999	1 Primera División (Apertura 1998)	
Milton Meléndez	(El Salvador)	April 1999	April 1999		1 game
Hernán Carrasco Vivanco	(Chile)	April 1999	November 1995		
Reno Renucci	(Mexico) (Italy)	November 1999	March 2000		
Manuel Alfredo Oberti	(Argentina)	March 2000	June 2000		
Jaime Rodríguez	(El Salvador)	July 2000	December 2000		
Carlos Reyes	(Uruguay)	January 2001	April 2001		
Juan Ramón Paredes	(El Salvador)	July 2001	June 2002	1 Primera División (Apertura 2001)	
Germán Gutiérrez de Piñeres	(Colombia)	July 2002	September 2002		
Julio Escobar	(Chile)	July 2002	December 2002		
Juan Quarterone	(Argentina)	December 2002	June 2003		
Henry Vanegas	(Colombia)	July 2003	October 2003		
Marcelo Javier Zuleta	(Argentina)	October 2003	December 2003		
Juan Martín Mujica	(Uruguay)	January 2004	December 2004	1 Primera División (Clausura 2004)	
Juan Ramón Paredes	(El Salvador)	January 2005	June 2005		
Richard Parra	(Colombia)	July 2005	August 2005		
Oscar del Solar	(Chile)	August 2005	December 2005		
Odir Jaques	(Brazil)	January 2006	February 2006		
Oscar Emigdio Benítez	(El Salvador)	February 2006	June 2006		
Miguel Mansilla	(Uruguay)	June 2006	October 2006		
Nelson Brizuela	(Paraguay)	October 2006	July 2007		
Pablo Centrone	(Argentina)	July 2007	September 2008		
Carlos Jurado	(Uruguay)	September 2008	February 2009		
Carlos García Cantarero	(Spain)	February 2009	May 2009		
Nelson Mauricio Ancheta	(Argentina)	May 2009	October 2009		
Miguel Ángel Soriano	(El Salvador)	October 2009	November 2009		
Miloš Miljanić	(Serbia)	November 2009	March 2011		
Roberto Gamarra	(Argentina)	March 2011	September 2011	1 Primera División (Clausura 2011)	
Leonel Cárcamo	(El Salvador)	September 2011	September 2011		
Vladan Vićević	(El Salvador) (Serbia)	September 2011	January 2012		
Leonel Cárcamo	(El Salvador)	January 2012	February 2012		
Juan Ramón Paredes	(El Salvador)	February 2012	April 2012		
Ramiro Cepeda	(Argentina)	May 2012	May 2013		
Miloš Miljanić	(Serbia)	May 2013	October 2013		
Juan Andrés Sarulyte	(Argentina)	October 2013	November 2013		
Alejandro Curbelo	(Uruguay)	December 2013	October 2014		
Ramiro Cepeda	(Argentina)	October 2014	March 2015		
Rubén Alonso	(Uruguay)	March 2015	February 2016	1 Primera División (Apertura 2015)	
Milton Meléndez	(El Salvador)	February 2016	February 2016		1 game
Daniel Fernandez	(Argentina)	February 2016	August 2016		
Milton Meléndez	(El Salvador)	August 2016	December 2016		
Jorge Rodríguez	(El Salvador)	January 2017	June 2019	2 Primera División (Apertura 2017, Clausura 2018)	
Wilson Gutiérrez	(Colombia)	June 2019	July 2020	1 Primera División (Apertura 2019)	
Juan Cortés Diéguez	(Spain)	July 2020	December 2020		
Milton Meléndez	(El Salvador)	December 2020	June 2022	3 Primera División (Apertura 2020, Apertura 2021, Clausura 2022)	
Adonai Martinez	(El Salvador)	June 2022	November 2022		
Eduardo Lara	(Colombia)	November 2022	June 2023		
Milton Meléndez	(El Salvador)	June 2023	December 2023	1 Primera División (2024 Clausura)	
Jorge Rodríguez	(El Salvador)	December 2023	December 2024		
Ernesto Corti	(Argentina)	December 2024	May 2026	1 Primera División (2025 Clausura)	
Marcos Portillo	(El Salvador)	May 2026	May 2026		1 game
Roberto Pompei	(Argentina)	May 2026	October 2026		
Diego Vásquez	(Argentina)	October 2026	Present		

== By number of trophies ==
Only managers who have won at least one trophy are mentioned.

Name	Period	Trophies				
Name	Period	Domestic			International	
Name	Period	PD	Cp	Other cups	CCC	UN
(Chile) Hernán Carrasco Vivanco	1965-1968, 1989-1991	3	0	0	1	0
(Uruguay) Rubén Alonso	1998, 2015 Apertura	2	0	0	0	0
(Uruguay) Estanislao Malinowski	???	1	0	0	0	0
(Uruguay) Gustavo Faral	1993–1994	1	0	0	0	0
(Uruguay) Juan Masnik	1996–1997	1	0	0	0	1
(El Salvador) Juan Ramón Paredes	2000–2001	1	0	0	0	0
(Uruguay) Juan Martín Mujica	2004	1	0	0	0	0
(Argentina) Roberto Gamarra	2011	1	0	0	0	0
(El Salvador) Jorge Rodriguez	2017, 2018	2	0	0	0	0
(Colombia) Wilson Gutiérrez	Apertura 2019	1	0	0	0	0
(El Salvador) Milton Melendez	Apertura 2020, Apertura 2021, Clausura 2022, 2024 Clausura	4	0	0	0	0
(Argentina) Ernesto Corti	2025 Clausura	1	0	0	0	0
