= Gualberto Fernández =

Salvadoran footballer (1941–2026)

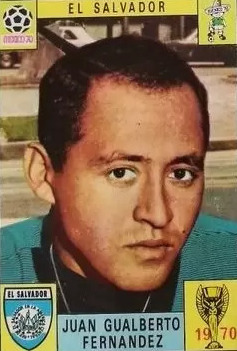
- Fernández in 1970

Personal information
- Full name: Juan Gualberto Fernández Rivera
- Date of birth: 12 July 1941
- Place of birth: Tegucigalpa, Honduras
- Date of death: 13 November 2026 (aged 85)
- Position: Goalkeeper

Youth career
- 1959-1960: Quequeisque

Senior career*
Years	Team	Apps	(Gls)
1961-1964	Quequeisque		
1965–1967	Alianza		
1968-1969	Atlante		
1970–1971	UES		
1972–1973	Platense		
1974–1977	Juventud Olímpica		

International career
	El Salvador	11	(0)

Managerial career
- 1980-1982: El Salvador (Goalkeeping coach)
- Independiente (assistant coach)
- Cojutepeque (assistant coach)
- 2007-2008: Alianza (Goalkeeping coach)
- * Club domestic league appearances and goals

Juan Gualberto Fernández Rivera (12 July 1941 – 13 November 2026) was a Salvadoran footballer who played as a goalkeeper. He was part of the El Salvador national team, representing the country at the 1970 FIFA World Cup in Mexico.

== Club career ==
Fernández played in the Salvadoran league for Atlante.

== International career ==
Nicknamed El Pulpo (the Octopus), Fernández played in the El Salvador in the sixties and seventies. In 1968, he participated in the Olympics in Mexico, where he appeared in the losses against Israel and Hungary as well as the draw against Ghana.

In 1968 and 1969, Fernández also helped the national team qualify for the 1970 World Cup in Mexico when he represented his country in 7 FIFA World Cup qualification matches. At the World Cup, he was a reserve and did not play in any match.

== Coaching career ==
Fernández also served as an assistant and goalkeeping coach for Independiente, Cojutepeque and Alianza.

== Death ==
Fernández died on 13 November 2026, at the age of 85.

== Honours ==
=== Player ===
Alianza F.C.

- Salvadoran Primera División: 1965–66, 1966–67
- CONCACAF Champions' Cup: 1967

Platense Zacatecoluca

- Segunda División Salvadorean: 1974,
