= 1965–66 Primera División de Fútbol Profesional =

Primera División de Fútbol Profesional
- Season: 1965–66
- Champions: Alianza F.C. (1st Title)
- Relegated: Quequeisque

The 1965–66 Primera División de Fútbol Profesional season is the th tournament of El Salvador's Primera División since its establishment of the National League system in 1948. The tournament began on 19 September 1965 and finished on July 10, 1966. Alianza F.C. secured its first Primera División title.

== Team Information ==
=== Personnel and sponsoring ===
Team	Chairman	Head coach	Captain	Kitmaker	Shirt sponsor
ADLER	(El Salvador) TBD	(El Salvador) TBD	(El Salvador) TBD	TBD	TBD
Águila	(El Salvador) TBD	(El Salvador) TBD	(El Salvador) TBD	TBD	TBD
Alianza	(El Salvador) TBD	(Chile) Hernan Carrasco Vivanco	(El Salvador) TBD	TBD	TBD
Atlante San Alejo	(El Salvador) TBD	(El Salvador) Marcelo Estrada	(El Salvador) Ricardo Bruno Navarrette	TBD	TBD
Atlético Marte	(El Salvador) TBD	(El Salvador) Isias Choto	(El Salvador) TBD	TBD	TBD
FAS	(El Salvador) TBD	(El Salvador) TBD	(El Salvador) TBD	TBD	TBD
Juventud Olímpica	(El Salvador) TBD	(El Salvador) TBD	(El Salvador) TBD	TBD	TBD
Once Municipal	(El Salvador) TBD	(Argentina) Alberto Cevasco	(El Salvador) TBD	TBD	TBD
Quequeisque	(El Salvador) TBD	(El Salvador) TBD	(El Salvador) TBD	TBD	TBD
Universidad	(El Salvador) TBD	(Argentina) Gregorio Bundio	(El Salvador) TBD	TBD	TBD

== League standings ==
Pos	Team	Pld	W	D	L	GF	GA	GD	Pts	Qualification or relegation
1	Alianza F.C.	36	20	10	6	83	38	+45	50	Champion
2	UES	36	17	13	6	69	44	+25	47	
3	Atletico Marte	36	12	15	9	62	53	+9	39	
4	C.D. FAS	36	13	12	11	57	44	+13	38	
5	Once Municipal	36	11	14	11	52	66	−14	36	
6	C.D. Aguila	36	10	11	15	62	73	−11	31	
7	Juventud Olimpico	36	8	15	13	50	64	−14	31	
8	Atlante San Alejo	36	11	9	16	47	64	−17	31	
9	ADLER	36	9	12	15	48	68	−20	30	
10	Quequeisque (R)	36	8	11	17	42	58	−16	27	Relegated to the Segunda División de El Salvador

Updated to match(es) played on 2015. Source: (in Spanish)
Rules for classification: 1) points; 2) goal difference; 3) number of goals scored.
(R) Relegated

== Records ==
=== Team records ===
- Best home records: TBD (00 points out of 33 points)
- Worst home records: TBD (0 points out of 33 points)
- Best away records : TBD (00 points out of 33 points)
- Worst away records : TBD (0 points out of 33 points)
- Most goals scored: TBD (79 goals)
- Fewest goals scored: TBD (33 goals)
- Fewest goals conceded : TBD (32 goals)
- Most goals conceded : TBD (76 goals)

=== Scoring ===
- Most goals in a match: 8 goals
  - Once Municipal 1-7 UES
- Most goals by one team in a match: 7 goals
  - Once Municipal 1-7 UES

== Top scorers ==
Pos	Player	Team	Goals
1.	(Panama) Luis Ernesto Tapia	Alianza F.C.	23
2.	(El Salvador) Mauricio Alonso Rodriguez	UES	23
3.	(El Salvador) TBD	TBD	TBD
4.	(El Salvador) TBD	TBD	TBD
5.	(El Salvador) TBD	TBD	TBD
6.	(El Salvador) TBD	TBD	TBD
7.	(El Salvador) TBD	TBD	TBD
8.	(El Salvador) TBD	TBD	TBD
9.	(El Salvador) TBD	TBD	TBD
10.	(El Salvador) TBD	TBD	TBD

== List of foreign players in the league ==
This is a list of foreign players in 1965-66 Campeonato. The following players:

1. have played at least one apertura game for the respective club.
2. have not been capped for the El Salvador national football team on any level, independently from the birthplace

ADLER

- (Argentina) Hugo Ponce
- (Guatemala) Tomas Gamboa

C.D. Águila

- (Costa Rica) Guillermo Elizondo
- (Costa Rica) Walter Pearson
- (Costa Rica) Raul Lizano

Alianza F.C.

- (Chile) Miguel Hermosilla
- (Chile) Ricardo Sepúlveda
- (Costa Rica) Guido Alvarado
- (Panama) Luis Ernesto Tapia

Atletico Marte

- (Argentina) Juan Andres Rios
- (Argentina) Rodolfo Baello
- (Argentina) Raul Pibe Vasquez
- (Costa Rica) Jose Luis Soto

Atlante

- (Costa Rica) Rodrigo Gallardo
- (Costa Rica) Anrias Ruiz

(player released mid season) (player Injured mid season) Injury replacement player

C.D. FAS

- (Argentina) Nelson San Lorenzo
- (Argentina) Hugo Sigliano
- (Costa Rica) Adonay Alfaro
- (Costa Rica) Carlos Marin
- (Costa Rica) Walter Aldana

Juventud Olimpico

- (Uruguay) Roberto Castelli

Once Municipal

- (Argentina) Jorge Alberto Diz
- (Argentina) Oswaldo Crosta
- (Costa Rica) Tarcisio Rodríguez
- (Costa Rica) Jose Manuel Lopez
- (Costa Rica) William Salas
- (Costa Rica) Gerardo Alfaro

Quequeisque

- (Honduras)

UES

- (Uruguay) Rubén Filomeno
- (Uruguay) Raúl Canario Avellaneda
- (Uruguay) Víctor Viteca Pereira
