= Leonardo Salas =

Chilean footballer

Personal information
- Full name: Leonardo Salas
- Date of birth: 14 September 1939
- Place of birth: Chile
- Date of death: 31 March 2020 (aged 80)
- Place of death: El Salvador
- Position: Forward

Senior career*
Years	Team	Apps	(Gls)
1962–1966	Audax Italiano	68	(18)
1966	Atlante San Alejo		
1967–1968	Alianza		
1968–?	Atlante San Alejo		

Managerial career
- 1980–1982: UES
- 1986: UES
- * Club domestic league appearances and goals

Leonardo Salas (14 September 1939 – 31 March 2020) was a Chilean football manager and player who played as a forward. Besides Chile, he developed his career in El Salvador.

== Career ==
Salas played for Audax Italiano in the Chilean Primera División from 1962 to 1966.

In 1967, he moved to El Salvador by recommendation of the Chilean coach Hernán Carrasco and joined Atlante San Alejo. Next, he switched to Alianza, taking part of the historical squad known as La Oquesta Alba (The White Orchestra). With Alianza, he won the 1967 CONCACAF Champions' Cup, scoring in both the semifinal against Philadelphia Ukrainians and the finals against Jong Colombia.

Considered a historical player of Alianza, he was honored in May 2019 in a 2019 Clausura match against Municipal Limeño.

He returned to Atlante San Alejo in 1968 and retired due to a knee injury.

As a football manager, he led Universidad de El Salvador in its promotion to the Salvadoran Primera División in 1981.

He also worked as football coach at Externado San José School, José Matías Delgado University and FundaMadrid El Salvador as well as at some El Salvador national youth teams at the end of the 1970s.

== Personal life ==
He made his home in El Salvador and died on 31 March 2020 due to a heart attack.

== Honours ==
Alianza

- CONCACAF Champions' Cup: 1967
