= Raúl Corcio =

Salvadoran football player and coach (1937–2022)

Personal information
- Full name: Raúl Corcio Zavaleta
- Date of birth: 20 March 1937
- Place of birth: Santa Ana, El Salvador
- Date of death: 28 October 2022 (aged 85)
- Position: Striker

Youth career
- Pipiles FC
- 1952-53: Juventud Atlética

Senior career*
Years	Team	Apps	(Gls)
1953-55	Santa Anita		
1954	Excélsior		
1955	C.D. FAS		
1957–1959	Atlante		
1959–1963	Águila		
1963–1965	Olimpia		
1966–1967	Atletico Marte		
1968	Firpo		
1969	Sonsonate		
1970–1971	C.D. Dragon		
1972	Municipal Limeno		
1973	El Roble de Ilobasco		

International career^{‡}
- El Salvador

Managerial career
- 1987: Cojutepeque F.C.
- ADET
- * Club domestic league appearances and goals as of January 2008 ‡ National team caps and goals as of 2008

Raúl Corcio Zavaleta (20 March 1937 – 28 October 2022) was a Salvadoran professional football player and coach.

== Club career ==
Corcio joined newly promoted Club Deportivo Aguila in 1959, he assisted the club in winning back to back titles (1959, 1960–61). The latter was under the management of Honduran Carlos Padilla who played a major part in Zavaleta next move. Zavaleta became the first Salvadoran to join Honduran powerhouse Olimpia, In his two years (1963–1965) with Olimpia he was able to win one championship.

== International career ==
Corcio represented El Salvador.

== Managerial career ==
In 1987, he took up his first post as a coach when he took charge of Cojutepeque. He was appointed manager of ADET in 1990.

== Death ==
Corcio died on 28 October 2022, at the age of 78.
