= Tomás Pineda =

Salvadoran footballer (born 1946)

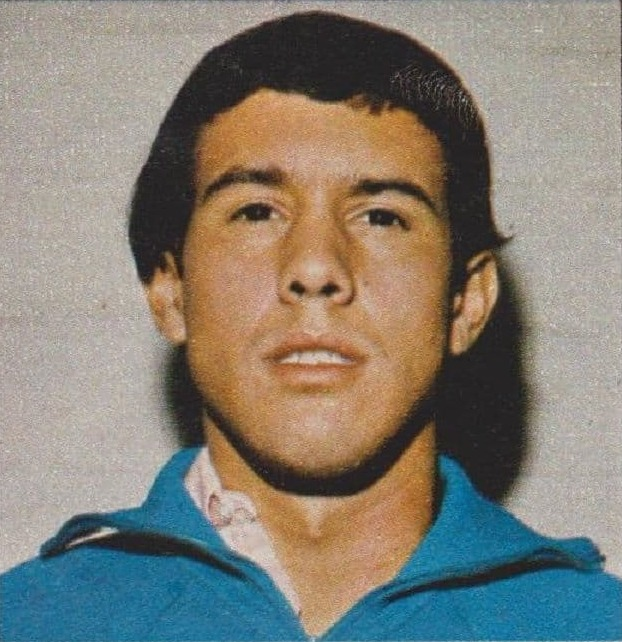
- Pineda in 1970

Personal information
- Full name: Tomás Ernesto Pineda Nieto
- Date of birth: January 21, 1946 (age 80)
- Place of birth: Santa Ana, Santa Ana Department, El Salvador
- Position: Goalkeeper

Senior career*
Years	Team	Apps	(Gls)
1963–1968	UES		
1968–1971	Alianza		
1971–1973	Juventud Olímpica		
1974	UES		
1975–77	Luis Ángel Firpo		

International career
1976	El Salvador	8	(0)
- * Club domestic league appearances and goals as of 25 September 2011

Tomás Ernesto Pineda Nieto (born January 21, 1946) is a retired football player from El Salvador.

== International career ==
Nicknamed el Flaco (the skinny one), Pineda represented El Salvador at the 1970 FIFA World Cup in Mexico, though he did not play a single match. He did appear in 2 qualifying matches for the 1978 FIFA World Cup, but had been playing second fiddle to Raúl Magaña and Gualberto Fernández during his career.

== Retirement ==
After retiring as a player, Pineda went into real estate and has worked as an architect and as an administrator at an automotive company.

== Personal life ==
Pineda is married to Regina and is father of three sons, two of them from his first marriage.

== Honours ==
- Primera División de Fútbol de El Salvador: 2

1971, 1973
