= Aline Griffith, Countess of Romanones =

American-born Spanish aristocrat, socialite, spy, and writer

Aline Griffith
- Countess of Romanones
- Full name: María Aline Griffith y Dexter (née Aline Griffith)
- Born: 22 May 1923; Pearl River, New York, United States
- Died: 11 December 2017 (aged 94); Madrid, Spain
- Spouses: Don Luis Figueroa y Pérez de Guzmán el Bueno, 9th Count of Quintanilla, 3rd Count of Romanones (m. 1947; died 1987)
- Issue: Don Álvaro de Figueroa y Griffith, 10th Count of Quintanilla, 4th Count of Romanones; Don Luis de Figueroa y Griffith, 11th Count of Quintanilla; Don Miguel de Figueroa y Griffith
- Father: William Griffith
- Mother: Marie Dexter

María Aline Griffith (y) Dexter, Countess of Romanones (22 May 1923 – 11 December 2017) was an American-born Spanish aristocrat, socialite, and writer who worked in the US Office of Strategic Services (OSS) during World War II and later for the CIA as a spy. The spouse of Luis Figueroa y Pérez de Guzmán el Bueno, a Spanish grandee, she was a close friend to world leaders and celebrities including Nancy Reagan, Jacqueline Kennedy, and Audrey Hepburn.

== Early life and education ==
Aline Griffith was born on 22 May 1923 in Pearl River, New York, the eldest of six children. Her father was William Griffith, an insurance and real estate salesman, and her mother was Marie Griffith (née Dexter), believed to have descended from the Pilgrims.

After graduating from the College of Mount Saint Vincent with a degree in literature, history, and journalism, Griffith was hired as a model in Manhattan by Hattie Carnegie. She was working as a model when, in August 1943, a chance encounter at a Manhattan dinner party led to the recruitment of Griffith into the Office of Strategic Services (OSS), a newly established intelligence agency and precursor to the Central Intelligence Agency (CIA).

As a recruit, she was sent to an American spy school near Langley, Virginia - the future home of the CIA. Griffith and one other woman were among the 30 men who endured a three-month training process that began each day at 7:30 a.m. Griffith learned various espionage techniques such as firing machine guns and revolvers, parachuting from planes, and recognizing codes and disguises. In preparation for potential capture and torture, the group practiced taking placebo poison pills known as the "L pill."

Following her training, Griffith was sent to Madrid as one of a dozen agents posing as employees of the American Oil Mission, which sold oil to Spain. However, her true mission was to code and decode messages that passed through the office and to recruit women for intelligence chains in order to keep track of Nazi whereabouts. Griffith chronicled her experiences during this time in her book, "The Spy Wore Red.”

Her espionage career is described in Elizabeth McIntosh's book, Sisterhood of Spies, Griffith "started out in Madrid in the X-2 code room in 1943 …[and] handled a small agent net that spied on the private secretary of a minister in the Spanish government.” McIntosh continues, describing her after-work hours, “she [Griffith] developed an extensive social life, reporting on the gossip she had overheard after a night of partying, often with Spanish aristocracy."

== Personal life ==
In 1947, Aline Griffith married Luis Figueroa y Pérez de Guzmán el Bueno (1918–1987), who held the title of Count of Quintanilla. Notably, he was the grandson of Álvaro de Figueroa, a statesman who had served as Prime Minister of Spain.

Griffith and her husband had three children:

- Don Álvaro de Figueroa y Griffith, 10th Count of Quintanilla, 4th Count of Romanones (born 21 February 1949), married Lucila Domecq Williams.
- Don Luis de Figueroa y Griffith, 11th Count of Quintanilla, (born 5 February 1950), married Princess Theresia zu Sayn-Wittgenstein-Sayn, and later, to María Inés Bárbara Márquez y Osorio.
- Don Miguel de Figueroa y Griffith, married Magdalena Carral Cuevas, and later, Cristina Moratiel Llarena.

The couple later became the Count and Countess of Romanones upon the death of her husband's grandfather, Álvaro de Figueroa.

== Socialite ==
Aline Griffith moved between her homes in Madrid, New York, and Pascualete, her country estate in the rural Spanish province of Caceres, which belonged to her husband's family and which she had painstakingly restored. Griffith was known for her lavish house parties, attended by many world leaders and celebrities, including Ronald and Nancy Reagan, Donald Trump, Jacqueline Kennedy, the Duchess of Alba, the Duchess of Windsor, Baron Guy de Rothschild, Salvador Dalí, Ava Gardner, Audrey Hepburn, and Grace Kelly.

Griffith also spent time in the movie industry. In 2009, Griffith helped craft Garbo: The Spy a documentary about Juan Pujol, a Spanish double agent who supported Britain during World War II. Several people were interviewed for the project, among them were Aline Griffith, Nigel West (a pseudonym used by intelligence expert Rupert Allason), historian Mark Seaman, investigative journalist Xavier Vinader, and psychiatrist Stan Vranckx.

Griffith was also known for her elaborate collection of precious jewels. Towards the end of Griffith's life, she chose to auction off a collection of necklaces, brooches, and earrings featuring emeralds, diamonds and rubies.

In several accounts the Countess was described as quick-tempered with an imperious personality. In June 2017, the New Yorker magazine published "The Countess's Private Secretary" by Jennifer Egan, which was an identifiable portrait of the countess and her manners.

== Publications ==
Griffith published seven books; six non-fiction books and one fiction book. The three Spy books all dealt with her involvement in espionage and intelligence.

- The Spy Wore Red (1988): the first book in Griffith's Spy series, covers her time as a model-turn-spy during World War II.
- The Spy Went Dancing (1991): the second book in Griffith's Spy series, follows the return of Griffith to the espionage world where she enlists the aid of the Duchess of Windsor to uncover a secret Nazi plot.
- The Spy Wore Silk (1991): the final book in Griffith's Spy series, chronicles Griffith's last mission as a spy, during which she uncovers a conspiracy in Morocco aimed at assassinating King Hassan II.
- The History of Pascualete: The Earth Rests Lightly (1964): a standalone book, covers the story of Griffith's renovation of Pascualete, a work in progress.
- An American in Spain (1980): a standalone book, covers the restoration process of her husband's medieval Spanish estate.
- The Well-Mannered Assassin (1994): the first fictional spy book by Griffith, based on her own experiences as a World War II spy.
- El fin de una era (2010): an autobiographical account that provides insights into the life of Aline Griffith and the era she lived in, with details about influential political figures, movie stars, and the social and cultural aspects of the time period.

=== Controversy ===
There is some controversy over the accuracy of Romanones' depiction of her work for OSS and the CIA in her memoirs. There is no doubt that she served as a cipher clerk for the OSS in Madrid during World War II, but ex-politician and author Rupert Allason, writing under the pen name "Nigel West", contends that her "supposedly factual accounts [of her espionage work] were completely fictional." In 1991, Women's Wear Daily reported that it had retrieved her OSS file from the National Archives and found that Romanones had "embroidered her exploits as an American spy". According to the paper, she started out as a code clerk and then moved into a low-level intelligence job that involved reporting on gossip circulating in Spanish high society; there was no mention of her shooting a man or assisting in the exposure of a double agent, as her first book, The Spy Wore Red, alleges. Romanones responded to the allegations in a March 1991 Los Angeles Times interview: "My stories are all based on truth. It's impossible that whatever details of any mission I did would be in a file." Women's Wear Daily had also quoted an anonymous former intelligence officer's complaint that Romanones' second memoir gives the misleading impression that she and the Duchess of Windsor alone found a CIA mole when "it took the whole CIA two years and about 200 people to do it." Romanones replied "I did not pretend to do it single-handedly. I explained clearly that they only came to us when they couldn't find him." The CIA has declined to comment on Romanones.

== Bibliography ==
- Elenco de Grandezas y Títulos Nobiliarios Españoles, Hidalguía Editions, 2008.
