= Quintanilla =

Quintanilla is a Spanish surname. Notable people with the surname include:

- Abraham Quintanilla, Jr. (1939–2025), American singer-songwriter and record producer, father of Selena Quintanilla-Pérez
- A.B. Quintanilla (Abraham Quintanilla III) (born 1963), American singer-songwriter and record producer, brother of Selena Quintanilla-Pérez
- Alba Quintanilla, Venezuelan composer, harpist, harpsichordist, pianist, conductor, and pedagogue
- Antonio de Quintanilla (1787–1863), Spanish brigadier and Governor of Chiloé
- Armando Quintanilla (born 1968), Mexican long-distance runner
- Beto Quintanilla (1948–2007), Mexican singer, songwriter and musician
- Carl Quintanilla (born 1970) is an American journalist and CNBC anchor
- Carlos Quintanilla (1888–1964), President of Bolivia
- Chente Quintanilla, American politician
- Diego Quintanilla (born 1991), Ecuadorian footballer
- Eleuterio Quintanilla (1886–1966), Spanish anarchist and educator
- Eliseo Quintanilla (born 1983), Salvadoran footballer
- Enrique Perea Quintanilla (1956–2006), Mexican journalist, crime reporter, and magazine founder
- Fernando Quintanilla (born 1964), Spanish footballer also known as Txirri
- Francisco Javier Quintanilla (1833-?), Chilean priest
- Hector Quintanilla (1923–1998), United States Air Force Lieutenant Colonel
- Isabel Quintanilla (1938–2017), Spanish visual artist
- José Quintanilla (footballer) (1947–1977), Salvadoran footballer
- José Alberto Quintanilla (born 1997), Bolivian swimmer
- María José Quintanilla (born 1990), Chilean singer, songwriter, and actress
- Mauricio Quintanilla (disambiguation), multiple people, including:
  - Mauricio Quintanilla (footballer, born 1952) (born 1952), Salvadoran football forward
  - Mauricio Quintanilla (footballer, born 1981) (born 1981), Salvadoran football defender
- Omar Quintanilla (born 1981), American baseball player
- Roberto Quintanilla (deceased 1971), Bolivian intelligence officer
- Rolando Quintanilla (born 1977), Mexican racing driver
- Selena Quintanilla-Pérez (1971–1995), American singer, songwriter, spokesperson, actress, and fashion designer
- Suzette Quintanilla (born 1967), American businesswoman and musician
