= German Gutierrez =

German Gutierrez may refer to:

- Germán Andrés Gutiérrez (born 1990), Colombian footballer
- Germán Gutiérrez Cueto (1883-1975), Mexican painter, sculptor, puppet designer and puppeteer
- Germán Cardona Gutiérrez (born 1956), the current Minister of Transport of Colombia
- German Gutierrez, Canadian film and television director
- German Gutiérrez de Piñeres, the head coach of Alianza F.C. in 2002
- Germán Ojeda Gutiérrez, Sporting de Gijón president 1998-1999
