= 1966–67 Primera División de Fútbol Profesional =

Primera División de Fútbol Profesional
- Season: 1966–67
- Champions: Alianza F.C. (2nd Title)
- Relegated: Atlante San Alejo

The 1966-67 Primera División de Fútbol Profesional season is the th tournament of El Salvador's Primera División since its establishment of the National League system in 1948. The tournament began on 1966 and finished in 1967. Alianza F.C. secured a second Primera División title and second Salvadoran league title overall; it was also the club's first back to back title, and .

== Team Information ==
=== Personnel and sponsoring ===
Team	Chairman	Head coach	Captain	Kitmaker	Shirt sponsor
ADLER	(El Salvador) TBD	(El Salvador) TBD	(El Salvador) TBD	TBD	TBD
Águila	(El Salvador) TBD	(El Salvador) TBD	(El Salvador) TBD	TBD	TBD
Alianza	(El Salvador) TBD	(Chile) Hernan Carrasco Vivanco	(El Salvador) TBD	Nil	Nil
Atlante San Alejo	(El Salvador) TBD	(El Salvador) TBD	(El Salvador) TBD	TBD	TBD
Atlético Marte	(El Salvador) TBD	(El Salvador) TBD	(El Salvador) Julio Cesar Mejia	TBD	TBD
FAS	(El Salvador) TBD	(El Salvador) TBD	(El Salvador) Ernesto Ruano	Nil	Nil
Juventud Olímpica	(El Salvador) TBD	(El Salvador) TBD	(El Salvador) TBD	TBD	TBD
Once Municipal	(El Salvador) TBD	(El Salvador) TBD	(El Salvador) TBD	TBD	TBD
Sonsonate	(El Salvador) TBD	(El Salvador) Victor Manuel Ochoa	(El Salvador) TBD	TBD	TBD
Universidad	(El Salvador) TBD	(El Salvador) TBD	(El Salvador) TBD	TBD	TBD

== League standings ==
Pos	Team	Pld	W	D	L	GF	GA	GD	Pts	Qualification or relegation
1	Alianza F.C.	36	18	12	6	66	37	+29	48	Champion
2	C.D. Aguila	36	16	11	9	53	44	+9	43	
3	Once Municipal	36	12	16	8	56	40	+16	40	
4	Atletico Marte	36	15	10	11	62	49	+13	40	
5	C.D. FAS	36	14	10	12	63	55	+8	38	
6	UES	36	12	14	10	52	48	+4	38	
7	Juventud Olimpico	36	11	12	13	43	47	−4	34	
8	ADLER	36	12	7	17	55	58	−3	31	
9	Sonsonate	26	10	0	16	51	66	−15	20	
10	Atlante San Alejo	36	7	4	25	38	95	−57	18	Relegated to the Liga B

Updated to match(es) played on 2022. Source: (in Spanish)
Rules for classification: 1) points; 2) goal difference; 3) number of goals scored.

== Top scorers ==
Pos	Player	Team	Goals
1.	(Panama) Luis Ernesto Tapia	Alianza F.C.	25
2.	(Brazil) Odir Jacques	Sonsonate	20
3.	(El Salvador) TBD	TBD	TBD
4.	(El Salvador) TBD	TBD	TBD
5.	(El Salvador) TBD	TBD	TBD
6.	(El Salvador) TBD	TBD	TBD
7.	(El Salvador) TBD	TBD	TBD
8.	(El Salvador) TBD	TBD	TBD
9.	(El Salvador) TBD	TBD	TBD
10.	(El Salvador) TBD	TBD	TBD

== List of foreign players in the league ==
This is a list of foreign players in 1966-67 Campeonato. The following players:

1. have played at least one apertura game for the respective club.
2. have not been capped for the El Salvador national football team on any level, independently from the birthplace

ADLER

- (Guatemala) Tomas Gamboa

C.D. Águila

- (Argentina) Eduardo Space
- (Brazil) Jorge Tupinamba dos Santos
- (Costa Rica) Raul Lizano
- (Costa Rica) Guillermo Otarola Vega
- (Costa Rica) Walter Pearson

Alianza F.C.

- (Chile) Miguel Hermosilla
- (Chile) Ricardo Sepúlveda
- (Chile) Luis Hernán Álvarez
- (Panama) Luis Ernesto Tapia

Atletico Marte

- (Argentina) Juan Andres Rios
- (Argentina) Carlos Chavano
- (Uruguay) Ademar Saccone

Atlante

- (Argentina)

(player released mid season) (player Injured mid season) Injury replacement player

C.D. FAS

- (Argentina) Nelson San Lorenzo
- (Costa Rica) Carlos Marin
- (Costa Rica) Gerardo Salazar
- (Uruguay) Leonel Conde

Juventud Olimpico

- (Argentina) Juan Quarterone
- (Uruguay) Víctor Viteca Pereira
- (Uruguay) Raúl Canario Avellaneda

Once Municipal

- (Costa Rica)

Sonsonate

- (Brazil) Odir Jacques

UES

- (Argentina)
