= Hugo Villanueva =

Chilean footballer (1939–2024)

Personal information
- Full name: Hugo Omar Villanueva Clavería
- Date of birth: 9 April 1939
- Place of birth: Chile
- Date of death: 23 June 2024 (aged 85)
- Height: 1.77 m (5 ft 10 in)
- Position: Defender

Senior career*
| Years | Team | Apps | (Gls) |
| 1959–1967 | Universidad de Chile | 133 | |
| 1967–1969 | UES | | |

International career
| 1964–1967 | Chile | 21 | (0) |
Medal record
Men's association football
Representing Chile
South American Championship
| Bronze medal – third place | 1967 Uruguay | Team |
- * Club domestic league appearances and goals

Hugo Omar Villanueva Clavería (9 April 1939 – 23 June 2024) was a Chilean football defender. He was in Chile's squad for the 1966 FIFA World Cup.

== Career ==
Villanueva played three games for Chile in the 1966 FIFA World Cup. He was also in Chile's squad for the 1967 South American Championship, playing two times, the game against Paraguay on 22 January being his 21st and last cap with Chile.

At club level, he played for Club Universidad de Chile and for Universidad de El Salvador.

== Death ==
Villanueva died on 23 June 2024, at the age of 85.
