= Mauricio Quintanilla =

Mauricio Quintanilla may refer to:

- Mauricio Quintanilla (footballer, born 1952) (El Chino), Salvadoran football forward from San Salvador
- Mauricio Quintanilla (footballer, born 1981), Salvadoran football defender from Ilopango
