= Estadio Universitario (UES) =

Coordinates: 13°43′17″N 89°12′07″W

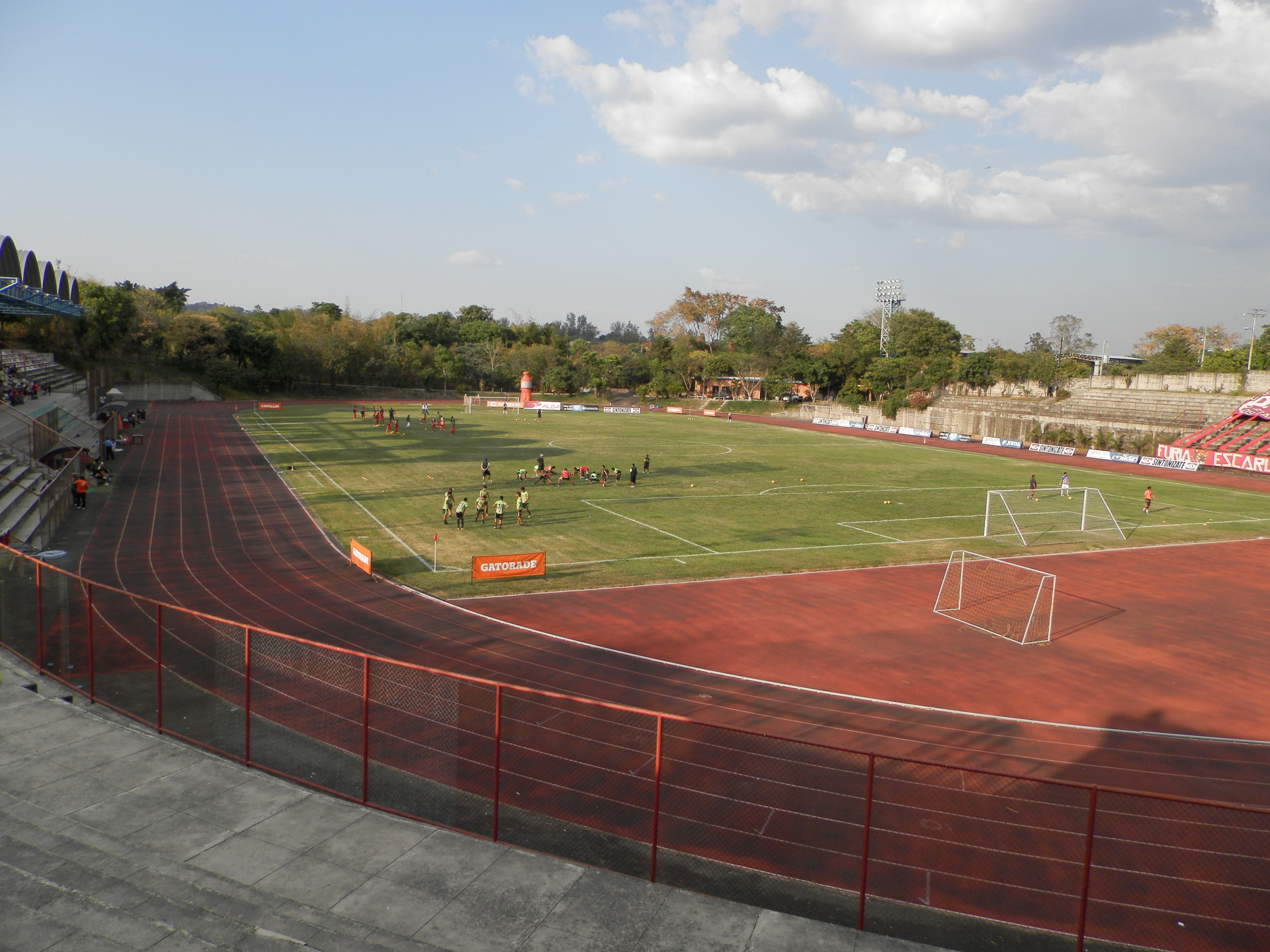
- Interactive map of Estadio Universitario (UES)
- Full name: Estadio Universitario "Héroes y Mártires del 30 de Julio de 1975".
- Location: San Salvador, El Salvador
- Capacity: 10,000
- Surface: Grass
- Field size: 101 m × 68 m (331 ft × 223 ft)

Construction
- Built: 28 February 2003 Inauguran complejo en la UES
- Cost: US$30,000 thousand

Tenants
- C.D. UES (2003–2020); Santa Tecla F.C. (2023-Present)

Estadio Universitario (UES) is a multi-use stadium in San Salvador, El Salvador. It is currently used mostly for football matches and is the home stadium of C.D. UES. The stadium holds 10,000 people.

== Renovations ==
On 4 April, 2015 Universidad de El Salvador announced they would be renovating by installing a new field which cost 30,000 US dollars.
