= 1994–95 Primera División de Fútbol Profesional =

Primera División de Fútbol Profesional
- Season: 1994–95
- Champions: FAS (10th Title)
- Relegated: Cojutepeque

The 1994–95 Primera División de Fútbol Profesional season is the 44th tournament of El Salvador's Primera División since its establishment of the National League system in 1948. The tournament started on August 28, 1994 and ended on July 2, 1995. FAS won the championship match against LA Firpo 3-1.

== Teams ==
Team	City	Stadium	Head coach	Captain
Aguila	TBD	Estadio	(El Salvador) Oscar Emigdio Benitez	(El Salvador)
Alianza	TBD	Estadio	(Argentina) Gregorio Bundio	(El Salvador) Joaquín “Kin” Canale
El Roble		Estadio Simeon Magaña	(El Salvador) Conrado Miranda	(El Salvador) Elmer “Negro” Peña
Atletico Marte	TBD	Estadio Cuscutlan	(El Salvador) Ricardo Lopez Tenorio	(El Salvador) Luis Guevara Mora
Baygon-ADET	TBD	Estadio	(El Salvador) Luis Angel Leon	(El Salvador) Sergio Valencia
Cojutepeque	TBD	Estadio Alonso Alegria	(El Salvador) Raul Corcio Zavaleta	(El Salvador)
FAS	TBD	Estadio	(Chile) Hernán Carrasco Vivanco	(El Salvador) William Osorio
Firpo	TBD	Estadio	(Chile) Julio Escobar	(El Salvador)
C.D. Municipal Limeno	TBD	Estadio	(El Salvador) TBD	(El Salvador)
Tiburones	TBD	Estadio	(El Salvador) TBD	(El Salvador)

== Managerial changes ==
=== During the season ===
Team	Outgoing manager	Manner of departure	Date of vacancy	Replaced by	Date of appointment	Position in table
Cojutepeque	(El Salvador) Raul Corcio Zavaleta	Sacked	1994	(El Salvador) Aquiles Mendez	October 1994	
FAS	(Chile) Hernán Carrasco Vivanco	Sacked	December 1994	(El Salvador) Ruben Guevara (Interim)	December 1994	
FAS	(El Salvador) Ruben Guevara (Interim)	Interimship over, moved to be assistant	December 1994	(Uruguay) Saul Rivero	January 1995	
Municipal Limeno	(El Salvador) TBD	Sacked	1995	(El Salvador) Victor Manuel Pacheco	February 1995	
Atletico Marte	(El Salvador) Ricardo Lopez Tenorio	Sacked	1995	(Brazil) Helio Rodriguez	1995	
Tiburones	(El Salvador) TBD	Sacked	1994	(El Salvador) Saul Molina	1994	
Alianza FC	(El Salvador) TBD	Sacked	1995	(Chile) Hernán Carrasco Vivanco	1995	

== Notable events ==
=== Notable death from 1994 season and 1995 season ===
The following people associated with the Primera Division have died between the middle of 1994 and middle of 1995.

- Carlos Marín Segura (Costa Rican, ex FAS player)

== Final Series ==
=== Semifinals ===
5 July 1995
15:00 (UTC-6)

FAS	3-2	Atletico Marte
Waldir Guerra		Abdul Thompson Conteh; TBD 76'

Estadio Cuscatlán, San Salvador

FAS progressed

6 July 1995
15:00 (UTC-6)

Aguila	1-3	LA Firpo
TBD		TBD; TBD; TBD

Estadio

LA Firpo progressed

== Final ==
July 2, 1995

FAS	3-1	Firpo
Fulgencio Deonel Bordón 61' 84' 88'		Raul Toro 79'

Estadio Cuscatlán, San Salvador

FAS:
GK	-	(El Salvador) Adolfo Menéndez
DF	-	(Chile) Ricardo Toro
DF	-	(El Salvador) German Saul Romano	Substituted on
DF	-	(El Salvador) Jaime Murillo
DF	-	(El Salvador) William Osorio
MF	-	(El Salvador) Jorge Rodriguez
MF	-	(El Salvador) Erber Burgos
MF	-	(United States) Hugo Perez
MF	-	(El Salvador) Guillermo Rivera
FW	-	(Argentina) Marcelo Bauza	Substituted on
FW	-	(Argentina) Fulgencio Dionel Bordón
Substitutes:
MF		(El Salvador) William Renderos		Substituted on
MF		(El Salvador) Mágico González		Substituted on
Manager:
(Uruguay) Saul Rivera

LA Firpo
GK	-	(El Salvador) Carlos Antonio Meléndez
DF	-	(El Salvador) Giovanni Trigueros
DF	-	(El Salvador) Leonel Cárcamo
DF	-	(El Salvador) Carlos Hernandez
DF	-	(El Salvador) Jose Maria Batres
MF	-	(El Salvador) Juan Garcia Gamez
MF	-	(El Salvador) Marlon Menjivar
MF	-	(Chile) Raul Toro
FW	-	(Panama) Pércival Piggott
FW	-	(El Salvador) Raul Diaz Arce
FW	-	(Brazil) Celio Rodriguez	Substituted on
Substitutes:
MF		(El Salvador) Pedro Vasquez		Substituted on
Manager:
(Chile) Julio Escobar

== Records ==
=== Team records ===
- Best home records: TBD (00 points out of 33 points)
- Worst home records: TBD (0 points out of 33 points)
- Best away records : TBD (00 points out of 33 points)
- Worst away records : TBD (0 points out of 33 points)
- Most goals scored: TBD (79 goals)
- Fewest goals scored: TBD (33 goals)
- Fewest goals conceded : TBD (32 goals)
- Most goals conceded : Cojutepeque (111 goals)

=== Scoring ===
- Most goals in a match: 11 goals
  - LA Firpo 11–0 Cojutepeque (April 30, 1995)
- Most goals by one team in a match: 11 goals
  - LA Firpo 11–0 Cojutepeque (April 30, 1995)
- Most goals in one half by one team: 7 goals
  - LA Firpo 7-0 (11-0) Cojutepeque (2nd half, April 30, 1995)
- Most goals by one player in a single match: 4 goals
  - (Brazil) Celio Rodrigues for LA Firpo against Cojutepeque (April 30, 1995)
- Players that scored a hat-trick':
  - (Brazil) Celio Rodrigues for LA Firpo against Cojutepeque (April 30, 1995)

== Top scorers ==
Pos	Player	Team	Goals
1.	(El Salvador) Raul Diaz Arce	LA Firpo	25
2	(Argentina) Fulgencio Deonel Bordón	FAS	20
3.	(El Salvador) TBD	TBD	TBD
4.	(El Salvador) TBD	TBD	TBD
5.	(El Salvador) TBD	TBD	TBD
6.	(El Salvador) TBD	TBD	TBD
7.	(El Salvador) TBD	TBD	TBD
8.	(El Salvador) TBD	TBD	TBD
9.	(El Salvador) TBD	TBD	TBD
10.	(El Salvador) TBD	TBD	TBD

== List of foreign players in the league ==
This is a list of foreign players in 1994-1995. The following players:

1. have played at least one game for the respective club.
2. have not been capped for the El Salvador national football team on any level, independently from the birthplace

C.D. Águila

- (Brazil) Adonis Hilario
- (Costa Rica) Alejandro Sequeira
- (Peru) Agustin Castillo

Alianza F.C.

- (Argentina) Luis Ramón Abdeneve
- (Costa Rica) Claudio Jara
- (Paraguay) Julián Coronel
- (United States) Robert Weavert

Atletico Marte

- (Sierra Leone) Abdul Thompson Conteh
- (Uruguay) Raúl Falero
- (Uruguay) Washington de la Cruz

Baygon-ADET

- (Honduras) Rudy Williams

Cojutepeque

- (Honduras) Jorge Alberto Meléndez

(player released mid season) (player Injured mid season) Injury replacement player

El Roble

- (Honduras) German Perez
- (Honduras) Arnold Lopez
- (Honduras) Fabricio Perez
- (Honduras) Javier Padilla
- (Uruguay) Carlos Rinaldi

C.D. FAS

- (Argentina) Fulgencio Deonel Bordón
- (Argentina) Marcelo Bauzá
- (Chile) Ricardo Roberto Toro
- (United States) Hugo Perez]

C.D. Luis Ángel Firpo

- (Brazil) Fernando De Souza
- (Brazil) Celio da Rodriguez
- (Chile) Raul Toro
- (Panama) Percibal Piggot

Limeno

- (Argentina)

Tiburones

- (Honduras)
