= Miguel Díaz (Salvadoran footballer) =

Salvadoran footballer (born 1957)

Miguel Ángel Díaz
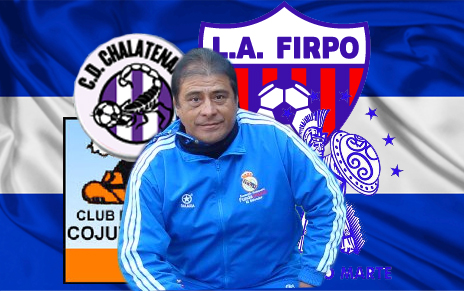

Personal information
- Full name: Miguel Ángel Díaz Arévalo
- Date of birth: 27 January 1957 (age 69)
- Place of birth: Chalatenango, El Salvador
- Height: 1.79 m (5 ft 10 in)
- Positions: Defender; striker

Senior career*
Years	Team	Apps	(Gls)
- Alacranes
- Atlético Marte
1977–1989	Chalatenango		
1990–1993	Luis Ángel Firpo		
1994–1995	Cojutepeque		

International career^{‡}
1978–1989	El Salvador	10	(0)

Managerial career
- 2005–2010: UES
- * Club domestic league appearances and goals as of 28 April 2017 ‡ National team caps and goals as of 28 April 2017

Miguel Ángel Díaz Arévalo (born 27 January 1957) is a retired football player from El Salvador.

== Club career ==
Nicknamed La Ardilla (Squirrel), Díaz started his career at Third Division side Alacranes, later renamed as Chalatenango, with whom he won promotion to the Second Division and later to the Primera División de Fútbol de El Salvador.

When they got relegated at the end of 1989 he moved to Luis Ángel Firpo where he played alongside Raúl Díaz Arce, and won two league titles.

He retired at Cojutepeque.

== International career ==
He has represented his country in 1 FIFA World Cup qualification match and at the 1982 FIFA World Cup in Spain.

His final international game was a May 1989 friendly match against Chile.

== Managerial career ==
He was coach of UES from 2005 through 2010, and took them from the Third Division to the Primera División de Fútbol de El Salvador.

== Personal life ==
He is married to Elizabeth, his wife, and they have four children.
