= Weslie John =

Trinidadian footballer (born 1991)

Personal information
- Full name: Weslie Lesleon John
- Date of birth: 29 July 1991 (age 35)
- Place of birth: Point Fortin, Trinidad and Tobago
- Height: 1.92 m (6 ft 4 in)
- Position: Centre-back

Team information
- Current team: Point Fortin Civic

Youth career
- W Connection

Senior career*
Years	Team	Apps	(Gls)
2009–2011	W Connection	0	(0)
2011–2013	→ Police F.C. (loan)	65	(6)
2013–2015	Point Fortin Civic	62	(4)
2016–2017	UES	32	(5)
2017	Bağcıl S.K.		
2017	Isloch Minsk Raion	8	(0)
2017	W Connection	5	(0)
2018–2019	Isloch Minsk Raion	33	(0)
2020	Andijon	0	(0)
2020	Jelgava	9	(0)
2022	Dvůr Králové	8	(0)
2023	Point Fortin Civic		
2023–2026	Prison Service	40	(7)

International career^{‡}
2011	Trinidad and Tobago U20	3	(0)
2016	Trinidad and Tobago	2	(0)
- * Club domestic league appearances and goals as of 31 December 2022 ‡ National team caps and goals as of 30 July 2017

Weslie Lesleon John (born 29 July 1991) is a Trinidadian professional footballer who plays as a centre-back.

== Career ==
Johnwas born to parents Carlene and Leslie John in Point Fortin, Trinidad. John's professional career began in 2010 at the age of 18, when he signed to W Connection in Trinidad and Tobago. At the beginning of the second season, he went on loan to fellow Pro League rivals Police F.C. where he spent two seasons. In July 2013, he transferred to newly promoted Point Fortin Civic F.C., his home town team. In January 2016, he signed to UES, helping the then last place team avoid relegation and retain their spot in the Salvadoran Primera División for the upcoming season and earned himself a selection to the "Best 11" team of the 2016 season.

His senior national team debut came in May 2016 when Trinidad and Tobago faced off against Peru for an international friendly. This was followed by another appearance against top-10 ranked Uruguay for another international friendly. John also represented Trinidad at youth level when he was a part of the 2011 Under 20 World Cup qualifying team.
