= Flor de Caña FC =

Nicaraguan football club

Flor de Caña
- Full name: Flor de Caña Fútbol Club
- Ground: Ingenio San Antonio, Nicaragua

Flor de Caña Fútbol Club is a Nicaraguan football team, based in Chichigalpa, Managua.

== History ==
They have played at the country's top level for several years, winning the league twice.

== Achievements ==
- Primera División de Nicaragua: 2
  1966, 1967

== Performance in CONCACAF competitions ==
- CONCACAF Champions' Cup: 1 appearances

Best: First Round in 1967
1967 : First Round

=== Record versus other nations ===
As of 13 September 2013

The Concacaf opponents below = Official tournament results: (Plus a sampling of other results)

Opponent	Last Meeting	G	W	D	L	F	A	PTS	+/-
(El Salvador) Alianza	1967	2	1	0	1	3	10	3	-7
Totals									

== List of players ==
- (Peru) Miroslav Cuculiza
- (Nicaragua) Oscar Calvo
- (Nicaragua) Roger Mayorga
- (Costa Rica) Germán Meza “El Macho”

== List of coaches ==
- (Peru) Jorge Dancur
