= Miguel Hermosilla =

Chilean footballer and manager (1948–2019)

Personal information
- Full name: Miguel Hermosilla Ramos
- Date of birth: 20 September 1948
- Place of birth: Santiago, Chile
- Date of death: 9 September 2019 (aged 70)
- Place of death: Santiago, Chile
- Position: Midfielder

Youth career
- Universidad Católica

Senior career*
Years	Team	Apps	(Gls)
1965–1968	Alianza		
1969	Municipal		
1970	Colo-Colo	24	(2)
1971	Rangers	17	(0)
1972	Antofagasta Portuario	30	(0)
1973	Águila		
1974	Alianza		
1975	Mariscal Santa Cruz		
1976	Antofagasta Portuario	17	(0)
1977	Aviación	3	(0)

Managerial career
- 1988-1989: Cobreloa
- 1992: Unión San Felipe
- 1993: Audax Italiano
- 1995-1996: Cobreloa
- 1997-1998: Coquimbo Unido
- 2004: Cobreloa (Ínterim)
- 2005: Cobreloa
- * Club domestic league appearances and goals

Miguel Hermosilla Ramos (20 September 1948 – 9 September 2019) was a Chilean professional footballer and manager who played as a midfielder for clubs in El Salvador, Guatemala, Chile and Bolivia.

== Playing career ==
A midfielder from the Universidad Católica youth system, Hermosilla emigrated to El Salvador and made his professional debut with Alianza. In his first stint with the team, what was known as La Orquesta Alba (The White Orchestra), he won two league titles in both the 1965–66 and the 1966–67 seasons, the two first titles for the club in its history. At international level, he won the 1967 CONCACAF Champions' Cup.

After a stint with Municipal from Guatemala, he returned to Chile and joined Colo-Colo, winning the 1970 Primera División. In Chile, he also played for Rangers de Talca (1971), Antofagasta Portuario (1972 and 1976) and Aviación (1977), his last club.

Abroad, he also played for Águila in El Salvador and Mariscal Santa Cruz in Bolivia.

== Managerial career ==
A historical manager of Cobreloa, he led the team in four stints, having begun his career as the assistant of Jorge Siviero in the same club in 1987. With Cobreloa, he won the 1988 Primera División. He also coached Coquimbo Unido, Unión San Felipe, Rangers de Talca and Audax Italiano.

In addition, he started the Cobreloa Academy based in Santiago, where began his career players such as Eduardo Vargas, Charles Aránguiz and Esteban Pavez.

In his last years, he coached the team of the students of laws from the University of Chile.

== Personal life ==
He was nicknamed Chueco (Bow-legged).

He died of a heart attack on 9 September 2019.

== Honours ==
=== Player ===
Alianza

- Salvadoran Primera División: 1965–66, 1966–67
- CONCACAF Champions' Cup: 1967

Colo-Colo

- Chilean Primera División: 1970

=== Manager ===
Cobreloa

- Chilean Primera División: 1988
