= ADLER =

ADLER FC
- Full name: Adler Futbol Club San Nicolás
- Nickname(s): Los Maquineros; TBD
- Dissolved: January 27, 1973; 52 years ago
Home colours

ADLER Futbol Club San Nicolás, commonly known as ADLER were a Salvadoran professional football club based in San Nicolas, Apopa.

They competed in the Primera División de Fútbol Profesional between 1965 and 1972. Currently Defunct.

== Notable players ==
El Salvador:

- (El Salvador) Salvador Flamenco Cabezas (1966–1971) .
- (El Salvador) Rafael Bucaro (1967-1972)

Guatemala:

- (Guatemala) David Stokes (1968-1969)
- (Guatemala) Tomás Gamboa (1966-1968, 1970) - 15 goals scored

=== Olympic Games players ===
This list all the players that have represented their respective national teams at the Olympics. Those in Bold were playing with ADLER when they played :

- (El Salvador) **Salvador Cabezas**
- (El Salvador) **Víctor Azúcar**
- (Guatemala) David Stokes

== Notable coaches ==
Argentina:

- (Argentina) Gregorio Bundio

El Salvador:

- (El Salvador) Rigoberto Guzmán
