= 1984 Primera División de Fútbol Profesional =

Primera División de Fútbol Profesional
- Season: 1984
- Champions: FAS (th Title)
- Relegated: Independiente

The 1984 Primera División de Fútbol Profesional season. At the end of the regular season, the top 4 teams took part in a Championship group stage. FAS were named Champions after topping the final group stage

== Teams ==
Team	City	Stadium	Kit Maker	Sponsorship	Head coach	Captain
Atletico Marte	TBD	Estadio Cuscatlan			(El Salvador)	(El Salvador)
Aguila	TBD	Estadio Juan Francisco Barraza		Sanyo	(El Salvador) Juan Francisco Barraza	(El Salvador) Luis Ramírez Zapata
Alianza	TBD	Estadio Cuscatlan	Pony	Pony	(El Salvador) TBD	(El Salvador)
Chalatenango	TBD	Estadio El Sombrero			(El Salvador) TBD	(El Salvador)
FAS	TBD	Estadio Oscar Quiteño	Pony	Maya Supercemento	(Argentina) Juan Quarterone	(El Salvador) Fredy Rivera
Firpo	TBD	Estadio de Usulutan	Pony	SURISSA	(El Salvador) TBD	(El Salvador) Abraham Vasquez
Independiente	TBD	Estadio Jiboa		CEL	(El Salvador) TBD	(El Salvador) Gustavo Guerrero
Once Lobos	TBD	Estadio El Progreso			(El Salvador)	(El Salvador)
UCA	TBD	Estadio	Pony	UCA	(El Salvador) Victor Cader	(El Salvador)
UES	TBD	Estadio Universitario		University of El Salvador	(El Salvador) Conrado Miranda	(El Salvador)

== Notable events ==
=== Luis Angel Firpo purchase of Agave spot in the Primera Division ===
On the Firpo acquired the spot of Agave F.C. in the Primera division. This ended the club solo appearance in the Primera division.

=== Notable death from 1984 season ===
The following people associated with the Primera Division have died IN 1984.

- Mauricio Humberto Castillo Guzman El Flaco (ex Once Lobos, Alianza, FAS player)
- TBD (ex TBD player)
- TBD (ex TBD player)
- TBD (ex TBD player)

== Managerial changes ==
=== During the season ===
Team	Outgoing manager	Manner of departure	Date of vacancy	Replaced by	Date of appointment	Position in table
TBD	(El Salvador) TBD	Sacked	1989	(El Salvador)	1990	
TBD	(El Salvador) TBD	Sacked	1989	(El Salvador)	1990	

== League standings ==
Pos	Team	Pld	W	D	L	GF	GA	GD	Pts	Qualification or relegation
1	C.D. FAS	27	13	9	5	32	19	+13	35	Qualified to finals.
2	Once Lobos	27	12	7	8	26	19	+7	31	Qualified to finals.
3	C.D. Luis Ángel Firpo	27	11	9	7	23	16	+7	31	Qualified to finals.
4	Atlético Marte	27	11	8	8	39	28	+11	30	Qualified to finals.
5	C.D. Águila	27	12	6	9	34	28	+6	30	Qualified to finals.
6	C.D. Chalatenango	27	11	7	9	32	28	+4	29	
7	Alianza F.C.	27	9	10	8	27	25	+2	28	
8	UES	27	8	5	14	19	34	−15	21	
9	UCA	27	6	8	13	26	38	−12	20	
10	Independiente	27	4	7	16	16	39	−23	15	Relegated to Segunda Division. (lost a playoff)

Source: https://www.rsssf.org/tablese/elsalhist.html#84

== Final round standings ==
Pos	Team	Pld	W	D	L	GF	GA	GD	Pts	Qualification
1	C.D. FAS	6	4	2	0	13	3	+10	10	Champions
2	C.D. Águila	6	4	0	2	10	9	+1	8	
3	Once Lobos	6	2	0	4	5	12	−7	4	
4	C.D. Luis Ángel Firpo	6	0	2	4	3	7	−4	2	

Source: https://www.rsssf.org/tablese/elsalhist.html#84

== Top scorers ==
Pos	Player	Team	Goals
1.	(El Salvador) Ever Hernández	FAS	17
2	(El Salvador) TBD	TBD	TBD
3.	(El Salvador) TBD	TBD	TBD
4.	(El Salvador) TBD	TBD	TBD
5.	(El Salvador) TBD	TBD	TBD
6.	(El Salvador) TBD	TBD	TBD
7.	(El Salvador) TBD	TBD	TBD
8.	(El Salvador) TBD	TBD	TBD
9.	(El Salvador) TBD	TBD	TBD
10.	(El Salvador) TBD	TBD	TBD

== List of foreign players in the league ==
This is a list of foreign players in 1984 Seasons. The following players:

1. have played at least one apertura game for the respective club.
2. have not been capped for the El Salvador national football team on any level, independently from the birthplace

Águila

- (Argentina) Alejandro Glomba
- (Brazil) Eduardo Santana
- (Guatemala) José Emilio Mitrovich
- (Guatemala) Ricardo Piccinini
- (Paraguay) Miguel Godoy Baldovinos

Alianza F.C.

- (Argentina)

Atletico Marte

- None

Chalatenango

- (Honduras)

FAS

- (Argentina) Néstor Enrique Cataldo
- (Argentina) Manuel Jovino Álvarez
- (Guatemala) Luis Fernando Morales

(player released mid season) (player Injured mid season) Injury replacement player

Independiente

- (Honduras) Luis Reyes
- (Guatemala) Rubén Paredes

Luis Ángel Firpo

- (Honduras) Raúl Centeno Gamboa
- (Honduras) Juan Cruz Murillo

Once Lobos

- (Guatemala) Byron Pérez
- (Guatemala) Óscar La “Coneja” Sánchez
- (Guatemala) Erwin Donis
- (Guatemala) Jorge La “Chana” Fernández

UCA

- (Brazil)

UES

- (Honduras) Harry Ramon Bran
