= Adonis Hilario =

Brazilian footballer

Personal information
- Full name: Adonis Hilario Vieira
- Date of birth: 1965 or 1966
- Place of birth: Brazil
- Position: Striker

Youth career
- 1983: Friburguense

Senior career*
Years	Team	Apps	(Gls)
1985–1986	Botafogo		
1986–1987	Herediano		
1987–1988	Guanacasteca		
1988–1993	Saprissa		
1994	Olimpia		
1994–1995	Águila		
1995–1996	Sacachispas		
- * Club domestic league appearances and goals

Adonis Hilario Vieria (born 1965 or 1966) is a retired Brazilian footballer who played as a striker and who played most of his career with Deportivo Saprissa of Costa Rica, during the 1980s and 1990s.

== Club career ==
With Saprissa, he won three national championships, as well as one CONCACAF Champions Cup. He also played for Herediano and Guanacasteca, as well as Águila of El Salvador and several teams in Brazil. He also played a season for Tecos UAG in Mexico.

He was the top goal scorer in the 1991 Costa Rica's first division tournament, in which he scored 26 goals.

== Retirement ==
After retiring in 1998, he began coaching in Saprissa's minor league system, where he still works.
