= Mauricio Quintanilla (footballer, born 1952) =

Salvadoran footballer

Personal information
- Full name: Mauricio Quintanilla Villalobos
- Date of birth: 8 October 1952 (age 74)
- Place of birth: San Salvador, El Salvador
- Position: Forward

Youth career
- 1969–1970: Atlante
- Molino de Ataco

Senior career*
Years	Team	Apps	(Gls)
1970–1974	UES		
1974–1979	Águila		
1979–1982	Xelajú		
1982–1984	Águila		
1984–1985	UES		
1985–1987	Cojutepeque F.C.		

International career
1981	El Salvador	5	(0)
- * Club domestic league appearances and goals

Mauricio Quintanilla Villalobos (born 8 October 1952 in San Salvador, El Salvador) is a retired Salvadoran football (soccer) player.

== Club career ==
Nicknamed el Chino, Quintanilla started his career at Salvadoran second division side Atlante and joined UES, aged 19. He also played for Guatemalan outfit Xelajú and Salvadoran giants Águila.

== International career ==
Quintanilla represented El Salvador in 2 FIFA World Cup qualification matches and earned 5 caps. He just missed out on the 1982 FIFA World Cup.

== Honours ==
=== Club ===
Aguila

- Primera División
  - Champion (3): 1975–76, 1976–77, 1983

Xelajú

- Liga Nacional de Guatemala
  - Champion (1): 1980
