= 1988–89 Primera División de El Salvador =

Primera División de El Salvador
- Season: 1988–89
- Champions: C.D. Luis Ángel Firpo (1st Title)
- Relegated: ADET

The 1988–89 Primera División de El Salvador is the 38th tournament of El Salvador's Primera División since its establishment of the National League system in 1948. The tournament began on 5 June, 1988 and ended on April 2, 1989. Luis Angel Firpo, the best team in the final group, won the championship match against Cojutepeque, the best regular season team.

== Teams ==
Team	City	Stadium	Head coach	Captain
Acajutla	TBD	Estadio	(El Salvador) TBD	(El Salvador)
Atletico Marte	TBD	Estadio Cuscutlan	(El Salvador)	(El Salvador)
Aguila	TBD	Estadio	(El Salvador) TBD	(El Salvador)
Alianza	TBD	Estadio	(El Salvador) TBD	(El Salvador)
ADET	TBD	Estadio	(El Salvador) TBD	(El Salvador)
Chalatenango	TBD	Estadio	(El Salvador) TBD	(El Salvador)
Cojutepeque	TBD	Estadio	(El Salvador) Conrado Miranda	(El Salvador)
FAS	TBD	Estadio	(El Salvador) TBD	(El Salvador)
Firpo	TBD	Estadio	(Argentina) Juan Quarterone	(El Salvador)
Metapan	TBD	Estadio	(El Salvador) TBD	(El Salvador) Antonio García Prieto

== Managerial changes ==
=== During the season ===
Team	Outgoing manager	Manner of departure	Date of vacancy	Replaced by	Date of appointment	Position in table
TBD	(El Salvador) TBD	Sacked	1989	(El Salvador)	1990	
Firpo	(Argentina) Juan Quarterone	Sacked	1988	(Chile) Julio Escobar	1988	
Alianza	(Argentina) TBD	Sacked	1988	(El Salvador) Francisco Amparo "Tigre" Zamora	1988	

== League standings ==
Pos	Team	Pld	W	D	L	GF	GA	GD	Pts	Qualification or relegation
1	Cojutepeque	36	14	15	7	50	39	+11	43	Qualified to finals. Won the right to play a Championship Game if they fail to win the final round.
2	C.D. Águila	36	12	17	7	34	26	+8	41	Qualified to finals.
3	C.D. Luis Ángel Firpo	36	12	16	8	41	30	+11	40	Qualified to finals.
4	Acajutla	36	11	18	7	38	31	+7	40	Qualified to finals.
5	Atlético Marte	36	12	15	9	40	34	+6	39	
6	C.D. FAS	36	9	20	7	35	34	+1	38	
7	Metapán	36	11	11	14	43	42	+1	33	
8	C.D. Chalatenango	36	7	17	12	30	33	−3	31	
9	Alianza F.C.	36	9	11	16	34	53	−19	29	
10	ADET	36	5	16	15	28	51	−23	26	Relegated to Segunda Division.

Source: https://www.rsssf.org/tablese/elsalhist.html

== Final round standings ==
Pos	Team	Pld	W	D	L	GF	GA	GD	Pts	Qualification
1	C.D. Luis Angel Firpo	6	2	4	0	11	8	+3	8	Qualified to championship game
2	Acajutla	6	2	3	1	10	5	+5	7	
3	C.D. Águila	6	1	4	1	10	9	+1	6	
4	Cojutepeque F.C.	6	0	3	3	5	14	−9	3	

== Final ==
2 April 1989

C.D. Luis Angel Firpo	2-2	Cojutepeque
Jose Maria Batres 5; 91	[ ]	Percival Piggot 6'; Hugo Ventura 118'
Penalties
Miguel Seminario (penalty missed); Abraham Vásquez (penalty scored); Martín Duffó (penalty scored); Kiko Henríquez (penalty missed); Fernando De Moura (penalty scored); Leonel Carcamo (penalty scored)	4 – 3	Hugo Ventura (penalty scored); Walter Martinez (penalty missed); Mauricio Alfaro (penalty scored); Ruben Guevara (penalty scored); Percival Piggot (penalty missed); W Ventura (penalty missed)

Estadio Cuscatlán, San Salvador
Attendance: 60, 000

Luis Angel Firpo:
GK	1	(El Salvador) Raúl Chamagua
DF	2	(El Salvador) Arnoldo Quintanilla (c)
DF	3	(Peru) Martín Duffo
DF	4	(El Salvador) Leonel Carcamo
DF	25	(El Salvador) Geovani Trigueros
MF	8	(El Salvador) Miguel Estrada
MF	6	(El Salvador) Jose Maria Batres
MF	10	(El Salvador) Mauricio Cienfuegos
MF	12	(Brazil) Fernando De Moura
FW	9	(El Salvador) Edgar Henriquez
FW	11	(Peru) Miguel Seminario
Substitutes:
MF	21	(El Salvador) Abraham Vasquez
MF	21	(El Salvador) Manuel Ayala
Manager:
(Chile) Julio Escobar

Cojutepeque:
GK	15	(El Salvador) Mauricio Vargas
DF	5	(El Salvador) Mauricio Quintanilla
DF	6	(El Salvador) Jose Luis Rugamas
DF	7	(El Salvador) Guillermo Ragazzone
DF	12	(El Salvador) Walter Ventura
MF	11	(El Salvador) Julio Molina
MF	21	(El Salvador) René Sorto
MF	22	(El Salvador) Mauricio Alfaro
FW	10	(Panama) Percibal Piggot
FW	16	(El Salvador) Hugo Ventura
FW	20	(Panama) Ruben Guevara
Substitutes:
DF	3	(El Salvador) Rodolfo Barrientos
FW	13	(El Salvador) Luis López Corcio
Manager:
(El Salvador) Conrado Miranda

== Top scorers ==
Pos	Player	Team	Goals
1.	(El Salvador) Hugo Ventura	Cojutepeque F.C.	17
2	(El Salvador) TBD	TBD	TBD
3.	(El Salvador) TBD	TBD	TBD
4.	(El Salvador) TBD	TBD	TBD
5.	(El Salvador) TBD	TBD	TBD
6.	(El Salvador) TBD	TBD	TBD
7.	(El Salvador) TBD	TBD	TBD
8.	(El Salvador) TBD	TBD	TBD
9.	(El Salvador) TBD	TBD	TBD
10.	(El Salvador) TBD	TBD	TBD

== List of foreign players in the league ==
This is a list of foreign players in 1988-1989. The following players:

1. have played at least one apertura game for the respective club.
2. have not been capped for the El Salvador national football team on any level, independently from the birthplace

Acajutla

- (Brazil) Eraldo Correia
- (Paraguay) (Uruguay) Asdrúbal Padin
- (Uruguay) Raul Esnal

ADET

- (Honduras)

C.D. Águila

- (Brazil) Joao Cabral Filho
- (Brazil) Ned Barbosa
- (Brazil) Eduardo Santana
- (Chile) Juan Carlos Carreño
- (Honduras) Ramón Maradiaga
- (Mexico) Nahún Corro

Alianza F.C.

- (Argentina) Óscar Biegler
- (Honduras) Patrocinio Sierra
- (Uruguay) Hernán Sosa

Atletico Marte

- (Uruguay) Enrique Daniel Urberti

(player released mid season) (player Injured mid season) Injury replacement player

Chalatenango

- (Argentina) Arnaldo Martínez
- (Brazil) Marco Pereira

Cojutepeque

- (Panama) Percibal Piggot
- (Panama) Ruben Guevara

C.D. FAS

- (Guatemala) Rogelio Flores
- (Uruguay) Ademar Benítez
- (Uruguay) Robert Brites
- (Uruguay) Héctor Cedrés
- (Uruguay) Luis Alberto Heiman

C.D. Luis Ángel Firpo

- (Brazil) Fernando De Moura
- (Peru) Martín Duffo
- (Peru) Miguel Seminario

Metapan

- (Honduras) Tomás Rochez
- (Honduras) Raúl Centeno Gamboa
- (Honduras) Domingo Droummond
