= Pipo Rodríguez =

Salvadoran footballer (born 1945)

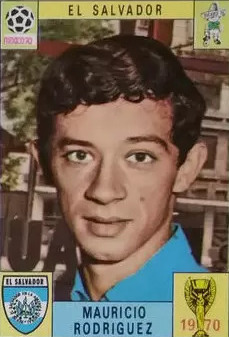
- Rodríguez in 1970

Personal information
- Full name: Mauricio Alonso Rodríguez Lindo
- Date of birth: 12 September 1945 (age 81)
- Place of birth: San Salvador, El Salvador
- Position: Right wing

Youth career
- 1959–1961: Colegio Externado San José

Senior career*
Years	Team	Apps	(Gls)
1961	Sport Boys Mejicanos		
1962	Atlante		
1963	FAS		
1963–1972	UES		

International career
1963–1970	El Salvador	37	(10)

Managerial career
- 1973–1974: El Salvador U-17
- 1975: El Salvador U-23
- 1975: UES
- 1975–1976: Sport Club Molsa
- 1976: Sport Club Tapachulteca
- 1979: Chalatenango
- 1980–1982: El Salvador
- * Club domestic league appearances and goals as of 25 March 2008

Mauricio Alonso "Pipo" Rodríguez Lindo (born 12 September 1945) is a retired footballer from El Salvador.

He represented his country at the 1968 Olympic Games, 1970 FIFA World Cup Mexico and coached them at the 1982 FIFA World Cup Spain.

== Playing career ==
=== Club career ===
Nicknamed Pipo, Rodríguez played soccer at high school level for the Colegio Externado San José. He began playing professionally for Atlante San Alejo in 1962. He was signed, on a one-year loan basis, by C.D. FAS.

Rodriguez permanently signed and played out his soccer career at Universidad from 1963 to 1972. Universidad was a professional soccer club that played in the top "A" professional league in El Salvador. The Universidad Club was owned by the Salvadoran National University, where "Pipo" studied and graduated with a civil engineer degree. During his playing career, he was a goal scoring machine. At the age of 20, he became the joint (with Panamanian Oscar Tapia) top scorer in the professional league with 23 goals during the 1965–66 season. He was best known for making acrobatic sideways shots and difficult scissor kicks.

=== International career ===
When he was 16, Rodríguez was selected to play for the El Salvador national under-17 football team and he was selected to play for the senior El Salvador, at the age of 17, in 1963. He helped the national team qualify and play in the 1968 Olympics. He scored a goal in the Olympic Games in tie against Ghana.

Later, he helped the El Salvador national team qualify for the World Cup. In the run-up he has represented his country in 8 FIFA World Cup qualification matches. El Salvador lost 1–0 in the first game in Honduras in their best two out of three matches. El Salvador won the next game 3–0 at home to even the series. The tie-breaker was played in a neutral site in Mexico. "Pipo" scored the winning goal in overtime against Honduras in a thrilling third game, which El Salvador won 3–2. Given the tensions between the two countries at the time, this winning goal may be the most famous and widely celebrated goal in El Salvador's soccer history. Some believe this victory led to the "football war" between Honduras and El Salvador.

In the next and final qualifying round for the 1970 World Cup, El Salvador faced Haiti in the best two out of three matches. "Pipo" scored a goal in the first game that El Salvador won 2–1 in Haiti. "Pipo" suffered a broken foot at the beginning of the second game. El Salvador lost the second game 3–0 in El Salvador. "Pipo" spent the next ten days mostly hospitalized with his foot on ice and receiving injection treatments in his foot. The treatment allowed him to play ten days later in the third game against Haiti. El Salvador won the third game 1–0 in Jamaica thanks to a goal by Juan Ramon "Mon" Martinez. "Pipo" was fitted for a cast soon after the end of this third game that qualified El Salvador for the 1970 World Cup. "Pipo" suffered with some foot pain for decades after the broken foot injury against Haiti.

Mauricio played at the World Cup Tournament held in Mexico in 1970. Knee injuries forced him to retire from playing soccer at the age of 27 in 1972.

== Managing years ==
Mauricio "Pipo" Rodríguez became a coach through the Association of trainers of football-soccer of El Salvador (AEFES). He obtained "A" level license and the "instructor" designation for this level. He became an Honorary Member of the Association of Latin Trainers in U.S.A. (LASCA). Mauricio also completed a FIFA course in Guatemala at the INST. FERNANDO RIERA in 1975. He became coach of the University F.C. in 1975. Later on he went to coach MOLSA F.C. a minor league team, which he led to win the league championship and won the right to move on up to the top professional league for the first time in MOLSA's history. Mauricio repeated this feat for Deportivo Chalatenango. Mauricio also coached the Tapachulteca F.C.

He became the coach of the under-17 years old El Salvador National soccer team in 1973. He then was named coach of the under 23 squad in 1975.

In 1980, Mauricio Rodriguez was appointed coach of El Salvador which he led through the qualification stages for the 1982 FIFA World Cup in Spain. As he publicly disclosed before the 1982 World Cup began, he retired from coaching after the World Cup.

== Retirement ==
After the 1982 World Cup, he focused on his engineering firm. He also served in various positions for the National Sports Institute (INDES), the Technical Commission for the Soccer Federation of El Salvador, the Board appointed by FIFA for El Salvador, the Board of "Funda Madrid" in El Salvador, and President of his old soccer club Universidad.
