= Luis Ernesto Tapia =

Panamanian footballer (1944–2024)

Personal information
- Full name: Luis Ernesto Tapia Pérez
- Date of birth: 21 October 1944
- Place of birth: Panama City, Panama
- Date of death: 13 November 2024 (aged 80)
- Place of death: Panama City, Panama
- Position: Forward

Youth career
- 1961–1962: Politécnica FC

Senior career*
Years	Team	Apps	(Gls)
1962–1963	Deportivo El Granillo		
1963–1970	Alianza		
1969–1970	Deportiva Galcasa		
1970–1971	Atlético Marte		
1971–1972	UES		
1972–1974	Juventud Olímpica		
1974–1979	Provincia de Panama Metro		
1979–1981	Atlético Ciudad de Panama		

International career
1963–1979	Panama	77	(20)
- * Club domestic league appearances and goals

Luis Ernesto Tapia Pérez (21 October 1944 – 13 November 2024) was a Panamanian football forward, who is regarded as the best player ever in Panama.

Tapia was a member of the Panama national team between 1963 and 1979.

== Club career ==
Tapia was raised in Barrio El Granillo, in Panama City and debuted at a young age with Panama national team. During a tour of El Salvador, he was signed by Alianza.

Known as the "Central American Pele", and "Cascarita", Tapia played primarily in El Salvador during the 1960s and 1970s, especially with the Alianza. He won the 1967 CONCACAF Champions' Cup with Alianza, scoring in the second leg and twice in the playoff against Jong Colombia, the latter in a 5-3 victory.

On 19 March 1971, in the then Estadio Revolución, about 25,000 fans witnessed the match between Brazil's Santos and Primera División side Atlético Marte. The Brazilian team featured Pelé, while Tapia played for Marte.

== International career ==
Tapia was part of the Panama team that participated for the first time in a World Cup qualifier. Tapia scored the first goal for Panama in a World Cup qualifier. He also toured with the Panama in Asia and scored 20 goals in 77 games for Panama.

== Death ==
Tapia died from a heart attack in Panama City, on 13 November 2024, at the age of 80.

== Legacy ==
In his honor, the Training Court next to Estadio Rommel Fernandez also known as mini-Rommel bears his name.

== Career statistics ==
Scores and results list Panama's goal tally first, score column indicates score after each Tapia goal.

List of international goals scored by Luis Ernesto Tapia
No.	Date	Venue	Opponent	Score	Result	Competition
1	31 March 1963	Estadio Nacional Flor Blanca, San Salvador, El Salvador	Nicaragua	5–0	5–0	1963 CONCACAF Championship
2	3 November 1969	Independence Park (Jamaica), Kingston, Jamaica, Jamaica	Jamaica	1–0	1–1	1969 CONCACAF Championship qualification
3	4 April 1976	Estadio Revolución, Panama City, Panama	Costa Rica	1–1	3–2	1977 CONCACAF Championship qualification

== Honours ==
Alianza

- CONCACAF Champions Cup: 1967
- La Liga Mayor: 1965–66, 1966–67

Aletico Marte

- La Liga Mayor: 1970

Juventud Olímpica

- La Liga Mayor: 1973
