= Hernán Carrasco =

Chilean football manager (1923–2023)

Personal information
- Full name: Hernán Carrasco Vivanco
- Date of birth: 29 March 1923
- Place of birth: Arauco, Chile
- Date of death: 10 September 2023 (aged 100)
- Place of death: Santa Tecla, El Salvador

Managerial career
- Years: Team
- 1960–1962: Colo-Colo
- 1962: O'Higgins
- 1963: Audax Italiano
- 1965–1967: El Salvador
- 1966–1967: Alianza
- 1968: Águila
- 1969–1970: Atlético Marte
- 1969–1970: El Salvador
- 1971: Excélsior
- 1975–1976: Regional Antofagasta
- 1977–1980: Aviación
- 1984: Universidad de Chile
- 1986–1988: Águila
- 1989–1990: Alianza
- 1991–1992: Luis Ángel Firpo
- 1993–1994: FAS
- 1999–2001: Águila
- 2001–2002: Municipal Limeño

Hernán Carrasco Vivanco (29 March 1923 – 10 September 2023) was a Chilean football manager.

== Career ==
Carrasco created a legacy in El Salvador by winning five Primera División titles with Alianza F.C. in 1966, 1967, 1989 and CONCACAF Champions' Cup in 1967 - Atlético Marte 1969, 1970 and Águila in 1968 and in 1987 he won a Primera División National Championship and also coached the El Salvador national team at 1970 FIFA World Cup in Mexico.

However, it was an unhappy campaign losing all three games and he resigned afterwards. He made an important contribution to the development of one of the best teams in Chilean history: Universidad de Chile "Blue Ballet". He was for many years president of the Chilean coaches and was one of the founders of the Salvadoran Coaches Association.

Carrasco had his own football school called the Academia Futuro de Hernán Carrasco Vivanco. He turned 100 in March 2023, and died on 10 September 2023.

== Honours ==
=== Manager ===
Alianza F.C.

- Salvadoran Primera División: 1965–66, 1966–67, 1989–90
- CONCACAF Champions' Cup: 1967

Atletico Marte

- Salvadoran Primera División: 1969, 1970

Aguila

- Salvadoran Primera División: 1987-88

Colo-Colo

- Chilean Primera División: 1960
