= 1967 CONCACAF Champions' Cup =

3rd edition of premier club football tournament organized by CONCACAF

Tournament details
- Dates: 6 August 1967 – 24 March 1968
- Teams: 10 (from 10 associations)

Final positions
- Champions: (El Salvador) Alianza (1st title)
- Runners-up: (Netherlands Antilles) Jong Colombia

Tournament statistics
- Matches played: 13
- Goals scored: 38 (2.92 per match)

The 1967 CONCACAF Champions' Cup was the 3rd edition of the top international club competition organized by CONCACAF for clubs from North America, Central America and the Caribbean, the CONCACAF Champions' Cup. It determined the 1967 continental football champions in the CONCACAF region. The tournament was played by 10 clubs from 10 national associations: Netherlands Antilles, Bermuda, El Salvador, United States, Guatemala, Haiti, Honduras, Jamaica, Nicaragua, Trinidad and Tobago. The tournament was held from 6 August 1967 till 24 March 1968.

The teams were split into three zones (North American, Central American and Caribbean), each one qualifying the winner to the final tournament, where the winners of the North and Central zones played a semi-final to decide who was going to play against the Caribbean champion in the final. All the matches in the tournament were played under the home/away match system. Alianza from El Salvador won the final, and became CONCACAF champions for the first time.

== North American Zone ==
The Zone was scratched and (United States) Philadelphia Ukrainians advanced to the North/Central American Zone Final as they were the only entrant.

== Central American Zone ==
=== First round ===
Torneo Centroamericano de Concacaf 1967.

6 August 1967 1st leg	Alianza (El Salvador)	8–0	(Nicaragua) Flor de Caña	San Salvador, El Salvador
CST	Luis Ernesto Tapia; Ricardo Sepulveda; TBD; TBD			Stadium: Estadio Jorge "Mágico" González

13 August 1967 2nd leg	Flor de Caña (Nicaragua)	3–2 (3–10 agg.)	(El Salvador) Alianza	Managua, Nicaragua
CST	Oscar Calvo; TBD		Goal	Stadium: Estadio Stanley Cayasso

6 August 1967 1st leg	Olimpia (Honduras)	0–1	(Guatemala) Aurora	Tegucigalpa, Honduras
CST	Nil		Manuel Recinos	Stadium: Estadio Nacional

13 August 1967 2nd leg	Aurora (Guatemala)	0–1 (1–1 agg.)	(Honduras) Olimpia	Guatemala City, Guatemala
CST			Goal	Stadium: Estadio del Ejército

20 August 1967 Replay	Aurora (Guatemala)	2–0	(Honduras) Olimpia	Guatemala City, Guatemala
CST	Goal			Stadium: Estadio del Ejército

=== Second round ===
10 September 1967 1st leg	Aurora (Guatemala)	0–0	(El Salvador) Alianza	Guatemala City, Guatemala
CST				Stadium: Estadio del Ejército

17 September 1967 2nd leg	Alianza (El Salvador)	1–1 (1–1 agg.)	(Guatemala) Aurora	San Salvador, El Salvador
CST	Luis Hernan Alvarez		Reginaldo Aleman	Stadium: Estadio Flor Blanca

15 October 1967 Replay	Alianza (El Salvador)	1–0 (a.e.t.)	(Guatemala) Aurora	San Salvador, El Salvador
CST	Mario Monge			Stadium: Estadio Flor Blanca; Attendance: 30,000

== Caribbean Zone ==
Pos	Team	Pld	W	D	L	GF	GA	GD	Pts	Qualification
1	(Netherlands Antilles) Jong Colombia	4	3	1	0	10	1	+9	7	Qualified to the Final
2	(Trinidad and Tobago) Regiment	4	2	1	1	5	7	−2	5	
3	(Jamaica) Regiment	4	2	0	2	5	6	−1	4	
4	(Bermuda) Somerset Trojans	4	1	0	3	8	8	0	2	
5	(Haiti) Racing Haïtien	4	1	0	3	3	9	−6	2	

- All matches played in Kingston, Jamaica.
- Jong Colombia wins group stage, advances to the Final.

== Playoff (North-Central America) ==
12 November 1967 1st leg	Alianza (El Salvador)	2–1	(United States) Philadelphia Ukrainians	San Salvador, El Salvador
CST	Mario Flores		Luis Pasache	Stadium: Estadio Flor Blanca

15 November 1967 2nd leg	Philadelphia Ukrainians (United States)	0–1 (1–3 agg.)	(El Salvador) Alianza	San Salvador, El Salvador
CST			Leonardo Salas	Stadium: Estadio Flor Blanca

== Final ==
=== First leg ===
1967 CONCACAF Champions' Cup Final
17 March 1968
AST
First leg

Jong Colombia (Netherlands Antilles)	2–1	(El Salvador) Alianza
Juan Obispo; Wilfredo Constancia		Mario Flores

Ergilio Hato Stadium, Willemstad, Netherlands Antilles

=== Second leg ===
19 March 1968
CST
Second leg

Alianza (El Salvador)	3–0	(Netherlands Antilles) Jong Colombia
Leonardo Salas; Odir Jacques; Luis Ernesto Tapia

Estadio Flor Blanca, San Salvador, El Salvador

Goal difference was not taken into account. As both teams won a game, a re-match was required.

=== Playoff ===
24 March 1968
CST
Playoff

Alianza (El Salvador)	5–3	(Netherlands Antilles) Jong Colombia
Mario Flores 13', 85'; Luis Ernesto Tapia 43', 52'; Odir Jacques 49'	Report	Jose Constancia 7'; Erick Constancia 65'; Wilfredo Constancia 77'

Estadio Flor Blanca, San Salvador

Team details

Alianza
Jong Colombia

Champions
(El Salvador)
Alianza
1st title
