= Gregorio Bundio =

Argentine footballer (1928–2015)

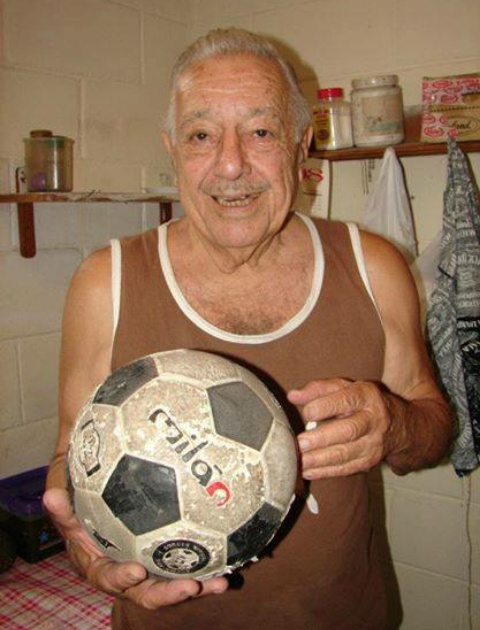

Personal information
- Full name: Gregorio Bundio Nuñez
- Date of birth: 14 May 1928
- Place of birth: Avellaneda, Argentina
- Date of death: 7 March 2015 (aged 86)
- Place of death: Santa Tecla, El Salvador

Senior career*
Years	Team	Apps	(Gls)
1944–1951	Independiente		
1951–1952	Palermo de Guatemala		
1952–1953	Atlético Marte		
1954–1955	Dragón		

Managerial career
- 1955–1956: Dragón
- 1956–1957: Águila
- 1959–1960: Alianza
- 1961–1962: El Salvador
- 1965–1968: UES
- 1968–1970: El Salvador
- Atlético Marte
- Pulgarcito de América
- 1974: Negocios Internacionales
- 1970–1972: Adler
- 1974: Atlante San Alejo
- FAS
- 1979–1980: Sonsonate
- 1980–1981: Juventud Retalteca
- 1982–1983: Sacachispas
- Huinca Renancó
- Ralicó
- 1979: Fuerte Aguilares
- * Club domestic league appearances and goals

Gregorio Bundio Nuñez (14 May 1928 − 7 March 2015) was a football player and manager.

Nicknamed Goyo, Bundio coached El Salvador from 1968 to 1970 and qualified them for their first ever FIFA World Cup Finals in 1970.

== Alianza ==
Gregorio Bundio was the first coach appointed by the newly formed club Alianza F.C. between 1959 and 1960.

In January 2011 he was given a pension for life by the National Assembly for his contribution to Salvadoran football.

== Personal ==
Gregorio Bundio son, Roberto Bundio, also was a footballer who played for Fuerte Aguilares and Águila in the Primera División, and Deportivo Armenio in Argentina.

== Death ==
On 7 March 2015, Bundio died at the age of 86, at Hospital of San Rafael in Santa Tecla.
