= Cojutepeque F.C. =

Salvadoran professional football club

- Full name: Cojutepeque Fútbol Club
- Dissolved: 2003
- Ground: Estadio Alonso Alegría Gómez
Home colours

Cojutepeque Futbol Club was a Salvadoran professional football club based in Cojutepeque, Cuscatlán. The team ceased operation in 2003.

== History ==
The team was in the first division of El Salvador from 1987 on for several years. Cojutepeque was a runner-up in the 1988–89 season, losing on penalties to L.A. Firpo in the finals after the game ended 2–2 after extra time.

== Record ==
=== Year-by-year ===
Season	Positions	Final series
1987–88	7th	Did not qualify
1988–89	1st	Final
1989–90	4th	Semi-Finals
1990–91	5th, Group A	Did not qualify
1991–92	9th, Relegation Playoff	Did not qualify
1992–93	6th	Did not qualify
1993–94	9th	Did not qualify
1994–95	10th, Relegated	Did not qualify

=== Club records ===
- First Match (prior to creation of a league): vs. TBD (a club from TBD), Year
- First Match (official): vs. TBD, year
- Most points in La Primera: 43 points (14 win, 15 draws, 7 losses) 1988-89
- Least points in La Primera: 18 points (4 win, 10 draws, 22 losses) 1994-95
- Record League defeat: 0–11 v L.A. Firpo. April 30, 1995.

=== Individual records ===
- Most capped player for El Salvador: 50 (0 whilst at Cojutepeque), TBD
- Most international caps for El Salvador while a Cojutepeque player: 1, TBD
- Most goals in a season, all competitions: unknown player, O (Year/year) (00 in League, 00 in Cup competitions)
- Most goals in a season, Primera División de Fútbol Profesional: Hugo Ventura, 17 (1988-89)

== Honours ==
Cojutepeque's first trophy was the Liga Ascensio, which they won in 1986-1987. They won 1 Segunda División title in 1986-1987.

Cojutepeque's honours include the following:

=== Domestic honours ===
==== Leagues ====
- Primera División de Fútbol de El Salvador
  - Runners-up (1): 1988–89
- Segunda División Salvadorean and predecessors
  - Champions: (1): 1986–87

== List of notable players ==
Players with senior international caps

- (El Salvador) (Argentina) Emiliano Pedrozo
- (El Salvador) Hugo Ventura
- (El Salvador) Nelson Mauricio Quintanilla
- (El Salvador) José María Rivas
- (El Salvador) Héctor Edmundo Valdivieso
- (El Salvador) Norberto Huezo
- (El Salvador) Rodolfo Alfaro
- (El Salvador) Mauricio Alfaro
- (El Salvador) Guillermo Ragazzone
- (El Salvador) Jose Luis Rugamas
- (El Salvador) Raul Chamagua
- (El Salvador) Miguel Diaz
- (Panama) Pércival Piggott
- (Panama) Ruben Guevara
- (Panama) Patricio Antonio Guevara
- (Panama) José Alfredo Poyatos
- (Panama) Victor Rene Mendieta
- (Panama) Carlos Maldonado
- (Uruguay) Raul Esnal

== Manager history ==
- (El Salvador) Oscar Emigdio Benítez (1985,1988)
- (El Salvador) Raúl Corcio Zavaleta (1986–1987)
- (El Salvador) Conrado Miranda (1989)
- (Argentina) Juan Quarterone (1993–94)
- (Argentina) Raúl Héctor Cocherari (1994–95)
- (El Salvador) José Amaya (1997)
- (El Salvador) Rigoberto Guzmán
- (Honduras) Aquiles Medina

The following managers won at least one trophy when in charge of Cojutepeque
Name	Period	Trophies
(El Salvador) Raúl Corcio Zavaleta	1986–1987	1 Segunda División Salvadorean
(El Salvador) Conrado Miranda	1989	1 Runner-up in the 1988-89
