= CD Universidad de El Salvador =

Association football club in El Salvador

Universidad de El Salvador
- Full name: Club Deportivo Universidad de El Salvador
- Nicknames: Los Pumas; Los Universitarios; La Ola Roja
- Short name: UES
- Founded: 1956; 70 years ago
- Ground: Estadio Universitario UES
- Capacity: 10,000
- Chairman: (El Salvador) Joel Hernández
- Coach: (El Salvador) Edgar "Kiko" Henríquez
- League: Liga de Ascenso

Club Deportivo Universidad de El Salvador, commonly known as UES, was a professional football team in El Salvador.

The club last played in the Liga de Ascenso.

== History ==
=== Early history (1950–1960s) ===
Universidad was founded in 1956. They slowly progressed up from the third division up until the Liga de Ascenso (Segunda División) where they remained there for six years.

Universidad was promoted to El Salvador's first division football league (Liga Mayor A) in the 1963–64 season. One of the key signings was that of 18-year-old Mauricio "Pipo" Rodríguez, a slender footballer with a knack for scoring spectacular goals, having considerable power with either leg. He would become the club's most influential player, even to this day.

The club's first season back was not successful at all. In that 1963–64 season, Universidad barely staved off relegation by a single point over Dragón which had managed a mere 14 points. The following season, the club had a more respectable run where it climbed to the middle of the table; however goals were hard to come by, having scored only 18 in as many games.

The 1965–66 season remains by many the most successful in the team's history. During this time, the format of El Salvador's first division changed, 4 rounds were played (36 games) instead of the customary 2 (18 games). It was during this campaign that CD Universidad was transformed. Led by "Pipo" Rodríguez, the squad became an all out attacking unit, displaying the flair that captured many of the neutral fan's attention.

However, their attacking flair (69 goals) was more than matched by Alianza, which finished top of the table with 50 points, 3 ahead of Universidad. "Pipo" Rodríguez finished as top scorer with 23 goals (tied with Alianza's Cascarita Tapia). One of the key moments occurred in the tail end of the season when CD Universidad traveled to California, United States to play a couple of exhibition matches with only 3 games left in the campaign. Later that same week, Universidad arrived back in El Salvador to play against an Once Municipal team fighting relegation. Tired Universidad players could not cope and lost the game.

For the rest of the decade Universidad, in spite of their attractive style, languished in the middle of the table finishing 6th, 7th and 8th respectively.

=== Mid-20th century (1970s) ===
The 1970 season saw another mid table finish for Universidad. However, in spite of their unassuming 6th-place finish, their 63 goals scored were fourth most in the first division and the team finished only 6 points behind eventual winner Atlético Marte, in what was one of the tightest races in the history of El Salvador's Liga A. The team closed the season with an impressive unbeaten streak in their last round to propel themselves as one of the teams to content for the league championship the following campaign.

Universidad were a serious contender in the 1971 season. The team, reinforced with the names of Gualberto Fernández in goal, Argentine striker Joaquin Cazalbón and Cascarita Tapia finished third in the league, 5 points behind eventual winners Juventud Olímpica and a single point behind Alianza. Universidad and Alianza interchanged leadership of the table for the majority of the first two rounds; however, Juventud Olímpica joined the race in the third round and didn't falter. At the end of the season, it was a 3-way tie between the 3 clubs with 44 points and only a 2 matches remaining in the schedule. Universidad had played one more match than Juventud Olímpica and needed a win when they met the co-leaders on 25 November 1971. Unfortunately, a 4-minute goal by Moises Gonzalez gave the "academia de oro" the victory which left a deflated "U" without the league title. Juventud Olímpica went on to defeat Alianza (1–0) in the last match of the season to earn their first league title. Universidad's inability to record victories against minnows such as Excelsior and Adler cost them dearly, as well as blowing 3–0 and 2–0 leads against Atletico Marte in the course of the campaign. Universidad's third-place finish at least allowed them to complete in the second Confraternidad tournament.

The format changed, yet again in 1972, which would be the last campaign for the gifted "Pipo" Rodríguez. Injuries had taken their final toll on his knees and ankles which led to his premature retirement at the age of 27 years. The new format called for 2 rounds (18 games) and thereafter, the top six teams would battle for the championship on a home-away round-robin format (10 games). Universidad managed to qualify, finishing in a very modest 5th place and scoring only 18 goals; however, in the "Liguilla" Universidad's attacking prowess came to the front (scoring 15 goals – tops in the "Liguilla") and, ranked as outsiders to win the championship, were the last team to have a chance of overtaking Águila for the championship. Universidad lost their last game 1–2 against FAS, while Águila defeated Municipal Limeño 1–0 to become champions.

The 1973 season was a restart of sorts as the main-stay of "Pipo" Rodríguez would no longer appear in the team's lineup. His absence was also manifested in the field of play as Universidad finished in fifth place after 2 rounds and just managed to qualify for the "Liguilla". However, unlike the previous season, Universidad only managed a paltry 3 points from 10 games and did not record a single win. Their dispirited play was quite evident in their 2 games against Atlético Marte, where they were soundly beaten 3–0 and 1–0.

The 1974–75 season held a lot of promise as "Pipo" Rodríguez returned to manage the team. Two Argentines of high quality bolstered the team, central attacker Tony Rojas, who scored with headers as much as with his feet and Victor Donato, a long blonde haired technician, who became the creative conduit of the team in midfield. Tomás "Flaco" Pineda returned to CD Universidad after a successful spell with Juventud Olímpica and replaced René Puquirre in goal. With other national footballers such as Victor "El Pato" Valencia, Eduardo "La Guapa" González, Celso Jurado, Mauricio "Chino" Quintanilla and Wilfredo Peñate, Universidad had an outstanding team that could vie for the championship. In addition, "Pipo" Rodríguez also brought an 18-year-old footballer who would become one of El Salvador's most talented players of all time, Norberto "Pajarito" Huezo.

It all started well, when prior to the season, Universidad won the "Torneo Relámpago", a mini tournament which consisted of the 10 teams in first division playing 10-minute games against each other on a knockout format. In the absence of goals, corners or shots on goal determined the winner.

In spite of an inaugural 1–1 tie against perennial powers Águila, Universidad quickly climbed to the top of the table by winning their next 6 games. Important wins against newly promoted Platense (1–0) – a side that would become champions, Atlético Marte (4–1), Negocios Internacionales (3–1), Alianza (1–0) and FAS (1–0) in the first round laid out their intentions. However, after remaining unbeaten in their first 11 games (8 wins and 3 ties), injuries to key players such as "Flaco" Pineda and Tony Rojas, which kept them on the sidelines throughout most of the second half of the season, slowed Universidad's progress and their faltering form saw them miss out of the play-offs to Platense and Atlético Marte. The format had again changed to 4 rounds (36 games) with the top 4 teams staging a semi-final play-off before advancing to the final.

There were few significant changes for the 1975–76 season. Tomas "El Flaco" Pineda departed to Luis Ángel Firpo leaving Juan "Gatti" Méndez (acquired from Municipal Limeño) in charge of goal. Norberto "Pajarito" Huezo and Victor "El Pato" Valencia now played for ANTEL and Alianza, respectively. Mauricio "Chino" Quintanilla had matured into the team's main attacking threat alongside the talented Tony Rojas. During this season, Universidad stayed atop the table throughout the entire season. The format had changed again where the season consisted of 3 rounds where teams where divided into two groups of six teams (33 games – 12 teams) with the top 2 teams from each group qualifying for the semi-finals. Universidad recorded several impressive results, defeating FAS and Atlético Marte 1–0, Sonsonate 4–0 and the highlight of their season, a comprehensive 2–0 victory over Águila over a rainy "Flor Blanca" field in the second round, with Victor Donato majestically exerting his influence in midfield.

At the end of the season, "La U" finished in 2nd place of their group with 40 points (1-point behind Alianza; 2 points ahead of Sonsonate) and qualified for the play-offs against a top seeded and record setting Águila team which had scored an impressive 79 goals during the season, 24 more goals than its nearest competitor. Universidad went into the first leg of the semi-final game as rank outsiders, in spite of having beaten Águila 2–0 in the second round, they had lost 0–4 and 0–2 in the first and third round respectively. Universidad confounded critics and fans alike by producing a masterclass performance and besting Águila by a score of 3–1; this in spite of missing a penalty when the score was still tied 0–0. The victory afforded "La U" the luxury losing the 2nd leg (by no more than 1 goal) and still qualify for the final. However, in the return match, Universidad was a mere shadow of the team that had previously dismantled Águila and allowed their opponents complete control of midfield. The 0–3 half-time deficit was reflective of their display and even after scoring in the 2nd half to make the game 1–4, Águila cemented their place in the final with another goal to end the game at 1–5 with a 6–4 aggregate score. Universidad played against FAS for 3rd/4th place devoid of foreign footballers and managed a respectable 1–1 half-time score before losing 1–4.

For the remainder of the decade, Universidad cut back on reinforcements (Tony Rojas, Victor Donato, Juan Méndez, Roy Saénz all left the team) due to limited financial resources and was constantly battling relegation, finishing in 11th, 9th, 10th place, when finally, during the 1979–80 season, was relegated to the second division (Liga B).

=== Decline in the late 20th century ===
From the next four seasons Universidad remained on the lower half of the table often escaping relegation on the last few games of the season, eventually, however, UES fell to relegation on 21 December 1986 after a dismal season futboldelsalvador.com. The club fortunes continued to decline struggling on the field (leading them to be relegated down to the third division) and financially, which almost lead the club to merger with Metapán FC in 1992. UES spent almost 11 years in the Tercera División before purchasing Real Santa Ana FC spot in the Segunda División (2002–03 season), however after a dismissal season the club was once relegated back to the Tercera División. It took another five years before UES were able to gain promotion in May 2008.

=== Champion of the Segunda División and return to the Primera División ===
UES qualified for the final series of the Clausura 2010 tournament of the Segunda División. After eliminating El Roble, they defeated the highly fancied Once Municipal over two legs 3–1 in the semi-finals, before they went on to defeat Fuerte Aguilares 3–1 in the grand final and being crowned champion of the 2010 Clausura on 2 June 2010 at the Estadio Cuscatlán.futboldelsalvador.com Thanks to winning the 2010 Clausura, it gave them an opportunity to face 2009 Apertura champion Once Municipal for the only spot to be promoted to the first division. On 6 June 2010, at the Estadio Jorge "Mágico" González UES defeated Once Municipal 2–1 thanks to goals from Williams González on the 72 min and the extra time winner by Henry Pérez on the 109 min.

=== Relegation in the Clausura 2017 tournament ===
C.D. Universidad de El Salvador, after a long battle in the season against Dragón, succumbed again to the relegation during the 2017 Clausura tournament. Efrain Burgos led the team during the entire championship, achieving in the first months good progress and excellent results to save the team from the relegation. However, almost at the end of the championship, the team began to fail in decisive matches, in an inexplicable way.

Two away defeats in a row against Águila (2–3) and Alianza (0–2) at the Estadio Cuscatlán, put the team in a very compromised situation in the relegation battle. A victory against Luis Ángel Firpo (2–1) at the Estadio Universitario gave limited hope for the team. The relegated team was decided in the last day of the national league, with all games played at the same time, C.D. UES were winning against Pasaquina (1–0) at the Estadio Universitario, but, in the final minutes, Dragón beat his biggest rival in the national league, Águila (0–1, in the Estadio Cuscatlán), condemning C.D. UES to the relegation zone, in one of the most exciting non-relegation finals of the national league.

=== Disappearance of the club ===
With the relegation already assumed, bureaucratic problems prevented the team from being registered in the Segunda División de El Salvador, generating a collapse of the team that generated serious administrative problems with the authorities of "La Liga de Plata". The non-payment to players (situation that days later was solved) only brought more problems to the team. Finally, by not being enrolled in Second Division, and by not generating economic income, and also for the lack of interest of the university sports authorities in keeping the club competing, the club finally disappeared in 2017.

=== Return of CD UES to professional soccer ===
In July 2018, CD UES it was restructured as a professional football team. Now CD UES compete in the Tercera Division de Fútbol Salvadoreño for the Apertura 2018 tournament. The team emerges again after many administrative and bureaucratic problems, being led by national coach and former UES player Santiago Iraheta in the project at the Tercera División. The team is composed mostly of students of the Universidad de El Salvador also highlighting some experienced players like Sergio Calero and Javier Durán, who were part of the youth reserves of CD UES in the Primera División.

On the return to the Estadio Universitario UES played before a friendly match against Saprissa FC of Chalatenango (5–0 victory). UES was put in the Grupo Oriente A, and his first official match was a 2–3 defeat against Altético San Lorenzo. UES first home match was a 3–2 victory against Maracaná de San Rafael.

In the Estadio Universitario the team has kept his unbeaten streak as November 2018, including the team's debut at the Copa El Salvador after a 2–1 victory against El Vencedor, club of the Segunda División. The biggest victory of CD UES to date it was a 7–1 victory against AD La Herradura.

UES secured the third place in their group and faced CD Gerardo Barrios for the quarter-finals. In the first leg UES achieved a 2–1 victory in the Estadio Universitario. But in the second leg, UES lost 1–3.

In July 2021, the university committee unanimously decided to not sign for 2021 third division due to the ever rising cost due to the COVID-19 pandemic. The club has not participated in any division since.

== Honours ==
=== Domestic honours ===
==== Leagues ====
- Primera División Salvadorean and predecessors
  - Runners up (1) : 1965–66
- Segunda División Salvadorean and predecessors
  - Champions (3) : 1962–63, 1980, 2010
  - Play-off winners: 2009–2010
- Tercera División Salvadorean and predecessors
  - Champions (1) :
  - Play-off winners: 2008

== Grounds ==
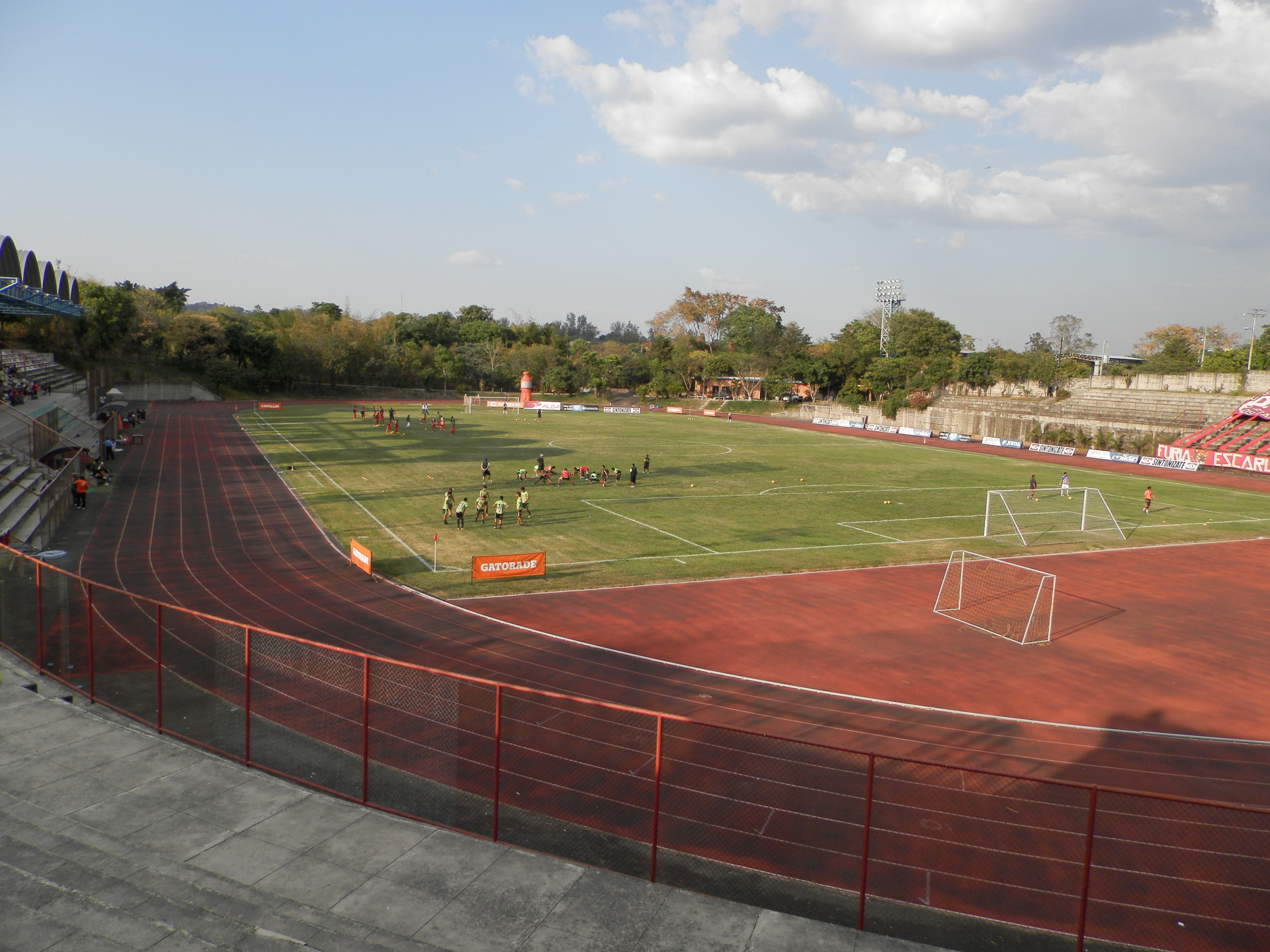

Estadio Universitario UES has been home to the UES since 2003. It has a capacity of 10,000. However, due to renovations being done to Estadio Universitario UES and not being able to be finished before the start of the 2014 Apertura and also 2015 Apertura season, UES will be playing their home games at Estadio Jorge "Mágico" González.

- Estadio Nacional Flor Blanca (1963–1986)
- Estadio Universitario UES (2003–2014)
- Estadio Nacional Flor Blanca (2015–2016)
- Estadio Universitario UES (2016–2020)

== Supporters ==
UES has two major supporters groups; "La Ola Roja" and "La Furia Escarlata". The first of these was The Red Wave (La Ola Roja), which was formed in 2010, which was inspired from the 1970s UES crowd which supported the team during the 1970s when UES were in the Salvadoran First Division. Crowd made up with deep social and, in politics, revolutionary inclination, which is visible in the games. The crowd has a particular tradition, which is to put flags on the rails of the stage. Excepting the flag of El Salvador, other flags of several ideological friendly countries: Cuba, Venezuela, Palestine and the Basque Country. The Red Wave used to have a blanket of Homer Simpson with the U's shirt with a red star, hammer and sickle at CD UES matches. Another custom of the crowd is that its members don't allow the consumption of alcohol and drugs during the team games. At home matches, The Red Wave is in the "General Section", in order to get involved with the people.

The Scarlet Fury (La Furia Escarlata), accompanying the team since it was in the Ascent League of El Salvador, is the latest organized crowd. It is a crowd that has its location in the Faculty of Engineering and Architecture at the University of El Salvador. The members of this crowd identify themselves with the idea of accompanying the CD UES team to away matches, encouraging the team in all matches. As a particular custom, at games, the crowd has some blankets with the pet of Iron Maiden band, Eddie the Head, adapted to the team colors and identity: Eddie U. La Furia Escarlata is the crowd with the largest number of blankets in quantity and size, recently organized in subsidiaries, each in each faculty of UES.

== Current squad ==
As of August 2026: Note: Flags indicate national team as defined under FIFA eligibility rules; some limited exceptions apply. Players may hold more than one non-FIFA nationality.

No.	Pos.	Nation	Player
—		ESA	TBD
—		ESA	TBD
—		ESA	TBD
—		ESA	TBD
—		ESA	TBD
—		ESA	TBD

No.	Pos.	Nation	Player
—		ESA	TBD
—		ESA	TBD
—		ESA	TBD
—		ESA	TBD
—		ESA	TBD
—		ESA	TBD

=== In ===
Note: Flags indicate national team as defined under FIFA eligibility rules; some limited exceptions apply. Players may hold more than one non-FIFA nationality.

No.	Pos.	Nation	Player
—	GK	ESA	Cesar Melara (From Hércules)
—	GK	ESA	Héctor Argumedo (From Fuerte Aguilares)
—	GK	ESA	Leonel Chincilla (From Free Agent)
—	MF	ESA	Diego López (From Free Agent)
—	MF	ESA	Javier Rivas (From Free Agent)
—	MF	ESA	Justin Cardoza (From Free Agent)
—	MF	ESA	Juan Villeda (From Fuerte Aguilares)
—	MF	ESA	Christian Soriano (From Free Agent)
—	DF	ESA	Diego Durán (From Free Agent)
—	DF	ESA	William Pinto (From Free Agent)
—	DF	ESA	Moisés Mejía (From Fuerte Aguilares)
—	DF	ESA	César Chévez (From Free Agent)
—	DF	ESA	Félix Anaya (From Free Agent)
—	DF	ESA	Diego Chévez (From Hércules)

No.	Pos.	Nation	Player
—	FW	ESA	Jesús Ochoa (From Free Agent)
—	FW	ESA	Josué Paredes (From Free Agent)
—	FW	ESA	Juan Carlos Reyes (From Free Agent)
—	MF	ESA	Donovan Sánchez (From Free Agent)
—	MF	ESA	Fernando Navarro (From Free Agent)
—	MF	ESA	Jonathan Cortez (From Free Agent)
—	MF	ESA	Tito Molina (From Free Agent)
—	MF	ESA	Adrián Figueroa (From Free Agent)
—	DF	ESA	Emiliano Carpio (From Free Agent)
—	DF	ESA	Joaquín Montoya (From Free Agent)
—	MF	ESA	Elvin Alvarado (From Free Agent)
—	FW	COL	Juan Esteban Victoria (From Club 29 de Setiembre)

=== Out ===
Note: Flags indicate national team as defined under FIFA eligibility rules; some limited exceptions apply. Players may hold more than one non-FIFA nationality.

No. / Pos. / Nation / Player	No. / Pos. / Nation / Player

== Reserve League squad ==
Note: Flags indicate national team as defined under FIFA eligibility rules; some limited exceptions apply. Players may hold more than one non-FIFA nationality.

No. / Pos. / Nation / Player	No. / Pos. / Nation / Player

== Personnel ==
=== Coaching staff ===
As of August 18, 2026

Position	Staff
Manager	(El Salvador) Edgar Henríquez
Assistant manager	
Reserve manager	
Under 17 manager	
Goalkeeper Coach	(El Salvador) Elio Guillen
Fitness Coach	(El Salvador) Robin Diaz
Team Doctor	
Kineslogic	
Utility manager	(El Salvador) Felix Flores
Sports nutritionist	(El Salvador) Nelson Catalan
Team Doctor	(El Salvador) Marcela Cortez
Sports Psychologist	(El Salvador) Cesar Ramirez
Sports Director	(El Salvador) Henry Chafoya

=== Management ===
Position	Staff
President	
Vice President	
Secretary	
Gerente	

== Records ==
=== Club records ===
- First Match (prior to creation of a league): vs. TBD (a club from TBD), Year
- First Match (official): vs. TBD, year
- Most points in La Primera: 00 points (00 win, 00 draws, 0 losses) Year/Year
- Least points in La Primera: 00 points (0 win, 0 draws, 00 losses) Year/year

=== Individual records ===
- Most capped player for El Salvador: 48 (1 whilst at UES), Norberto Huezo
- Most international caps for El Salvador while a UES player: 37, Mauricio "Pipo" Rodriguez
- Most goals in a season, all competitions: unknown player, O (Year/year) (00 in League, 00 in Cup competitions)
- Most goals in a season, La Primera: TBD, 7

=== Historical matches ===
13 February 1966 Friendly	Universidad de El Salvador	2–3	Estudiantes de La Plata	San Salvador, El Salvador
	Mauricio Rodriguez; Luis Tapia		Juan Echecopar; Ruben Bedogni; Zuninga own	Stadium: TBD

1 May 1966 Friendly	Universidad de El Salvador	0–6	Corinthians	San Salvador, El Salvador
	Nil		Goal	Stadium: TBD

7 May 1966 Friendly	Universidad de El Salvador	0–2	Vasco da Gama	San Salvador, El Salvador
	Nil		Goal	Stadium: TBD

7 May 1966 1966 Pacific Coast International Championship	Universidad de El Salvador	0–2	Los Angeles Selectes	San Salvador, El Salvador
	Nil		Goal	Stadium: TBD

8 May 1966 1966 Pacific Coast International Championship	Universidad de El Salvador	1–2	San Francisco	San Salvador, El Salvador
	To be determined		Goal	Stadium: TBD

== Notable players ==
=== Internationals who have played at UES ===
Players marked in bold gained their caps while playing at UES.

- (Chile) Hugo Villanueva
- (Costa Rica) Elías Valenciano
- (Guatemala) Hugo Peña
- (Guatemala) Roberto Zuñiga Garcia
- (Nicaragua) (El Salvador) Cyril Errington
- (Panama) Luis Ernesto Tapia
- (Paraguay) Benigno Apodaca
- (El Salvador) (Uruguay) Cristian Esnal
- (El Salvador) Norberto Huezo
- (El Salvador) Mauricio "Pipo" Rodríguez
- (El Salvador) Jorge "Indio" Vásquez
- (Trinidad and Tobago) Weslie John
- (Venezuela) Rafael Ponce

=== World Cup players ===
**World Cup 1966**

- (Chile) **Hugo Villanueva**

**World Cup 1970**

- (El Salvador) **Mauricio "Pipo" Rodríguez**
- (El Salvador) **Jorge "Indio" Vásquez**

**World Cup 1982**

- (El Salvador) **Norberto Huezo**

=== Team captains ===
Name	Years
(El Salvador) Jorge "Indio" Vásquez	1970
(El Salvador) Carlos Vilatoro	TBD
(Argentina) Victor Donato	1973
(Argentina) Tony Rojas	1974
(El Salvador) Wilfredo Penate	1974-75
(Honduras) Mario Bonilla "Pacharaca"	1986
(El Salvador) Ramiro Carballo	2013

== List of coaches ==
The club's current manager is Salvadoran Edgar "Kiko" Henríquez. There have been TBD permanent and TBD caretaker managers of Universidad since the appointment of the club's first professional manager, TBD in TBD. The club's longest-serving manager, in terms of both length of tenure and number of games overseen, is TBD, who managed the club between 1996 and 2018. Argentinian Gregorio Bundio was also Universidad's first manager from outside the El Salvador. Conrado Miranda is the club's most successful coach, having won one Sefinda division title and one runners Primera División title; following closely is TBD, who won two Segunda division titles.

**The following managers won at least one trophy when in charge of Universidad**
Name	Period	Trophies
(El Salvador) Conrado Miranda	1962–1964	1 Segunda division
(Chile) Leonardo Salas	1980–1982	1 Segunda division
(El Salvador) Miguel Díaz (Salvadoran footballer)	2005–2010	1 Segunda division

- (El Salvador) Conrado Miranda (1962–64)
- (Argentina) Gregorio Bundio (1965–68)
- (Chile) Sergio Lecea (1968)
- (Argentina) Marcelo Estrada (1968–69)
- (Argentina) Gregorio Bundio (1971)
- (Italy) José Rossini (1972)
- (Argentina) Hector Alfredo D'Angelo (1972)
- (El Salvador) "Pipo" Rodríguez (February 1974 - December 1974)
- (Chile) Javier Mascaró (January 1975 - December 1975)
- (El Salvador) "Pipo" Rodríguez (1975)
- (Chile) Javier Mascaró (1978)
- (El Salvador) Santiago Chicas
- (El Salvador) Raúl "Cayito" Mejía Fuentes
- (Chile) Leonardo Salas (1980–82)
- (Brazil) Jorge Tupinambá (1982–86)
- (Chile) Leonardo Salas (1986)
- (Argentina) Mario Rey (1986–87)
- (El Salvador) Juan Ramón Paredes (1987–88)
- (Argentina) Gregorio Bundio (1995)
- (El Salvador) Cecilio "Chilo" Monge (2003–05)
- (El Salvador) Miguel Ángel Díaz (2005 – June 2010)
- (Uruguay) Rubén Alonso (June 2010 – November 2010)
- (El Salvador) Edgar "Kiko" Henríquez (November 2010 – March 2011)
- (Brazil) Eraldo Correia (March 2011 – September 2011)
- (El Salvador) Miguel Ángel Soriano (September 2011 – October 2011)
- (El Salvador) Jorge Abrego (October 2011 – December 2011)
- (Paraguay) Roberto Gamarra (Jan 2012 – October 2012)
- (El Salvador) Jorge Abrego (October 2012 – March 2013)
- (El Salvador) Miguel Ángel Díaz (March 2013 – April 2013)
- (El Salvador) Carlos Meléndez (April 2013 – July 2013)
- (Argentina) Jorge García (July 2013 – February 2014)
- (El Salvador) Willian Renderos Iraheta (Feb 2014 – September 2015)
- (El Salvador) Efrain Burgos (September 2015 – December 2015)
- (El Salvador) Edgar "Kiko" Henríquez (December 2015 – October 2016)
- (El Salvador) Horacio Reyes (October 2016)
- (El Salvador) Efrain Burgos (October 2016 – April 2017)
- (El Salvador) Santiago Iraheta (July 2018 – 2019)
- (El Salvador) Oscar Navarro (January 2020 – June 2021)
- “Hiatus” (July 2021 – July 2026)
- (El Salvador) Edgar "Kiko" Henríquez (August 2026 – present)
