= Atlante San Alejo =

A.D. Atlante
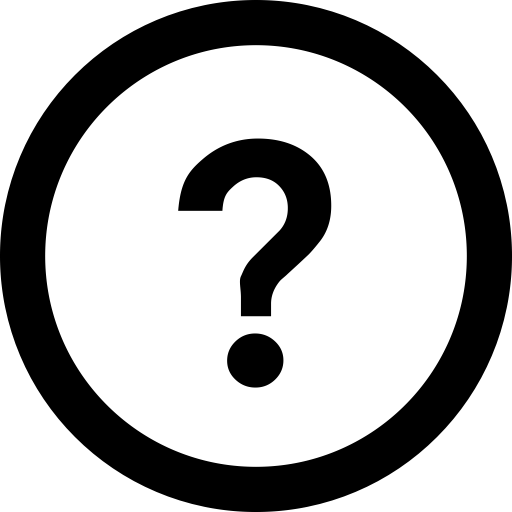
- Full name: Asociación Deportivo Atlante
- Nickname(s): Rojinegros, Los Patrulleros
- Founded: 1955; 70 years ago (1949; 76 years ago as Guardia Nacional)
- Dissolved: 1973; 52 years ago

'A.D. Atlante, or better known as Atlante, was a professional soccer team in El Salvador. Atlante played in San Salvador.

== History ==
Founded as Guardia Nacional in 1949, The club was created and supported Guardia Nacional a branch of the Salvadoran Military. The club changed its name to Atlante in the 1955–1956 season once the club won promotion to the country's top tier.

Atlante never won a national title in El Salvador. However, they did manage to finish second in the 1956–1957 national regular season league, and as runners-up again in 1962. In 1970 they were relegated to the second division.

On the 23 March 1973, Atlante sold their spot in the second division to Asociacion Deportiva Atiquizaya Club 10-20 this was due to the fact Guardia Nacional was withdrawing their financial support and the club ceased operations.

== Honours ==
=== Domestic championships ===
- Primera División de Fútbol de El Salvador

Runner-up (2): 1956-1957, 1962

== Records ==
=== Club Records ===
- First Match (prior to creation of a league): vs. TBD (a club from TBD), Year
- First Match (official): vs. TBD, year
- Most points in La Primera: 00 points (00 win, 00 draws, 0 losses) Year/Year
- Least points in La Primera: 00 points (0 win, 0 draws, 00 losses) Year/year
- Record Win: 19-1 vs. Platense, Cancha Jorgito Meléndez, 11 September 1968.

=== Individual records ===
- Most capped player for El Salvador: 50 (0 whilst at Atlante), TBD
- Most international caps for El Salvador while an Atlante player: 1, TBD
- Most goals in a season, all competitions: unknown player, O (Year/year) (00 in League, 00 in Cup competitions)
- Most goals in a season, La Primera: TBD, 7

=== Historical Matches ===
September 14, 1956 Friendly	Atlante	3–5	Brasil de Pelotas	San Salvador, El Salvador
	TBD; TBD		TBD; TBD; TBD	Stadium: TBD

25 December 1957 Friendly	Atlante	0-5	Cúcuta Deportivo	San Salvador, El Salvador
	Nil		TBD; TBD; TBD	Stadium: TBD

January 5, 1962 Friendly	Atlante	0-2	Cruzeiro	San Salvador, El Salvador
	Nil		TBD; TBD	Stadium: TBD

== List of notable players ==
- (El Salvador) Mauricio Rodriguez
- (El Salvador) Salvador Mariona
- (El Salvador) Raul Corcio Zavaleta
- (Paraguay) Jorge Lino Romero
- (Guatemala) Tomás Gamboa

=== Team captains ===
Name	Years
(El Salvador) Ricardo Bruno Navarrette	1965
(El Salvador) TBD	TBD

== List of coaches ==
- (El Salvador) Conrado Miranda (1962)
- (El Salvador) Carlos “Ranchero” Guerra (1962)
- (El Salvador) Marcelo Estrada (1965–1966)
- (Argentina) José Santacolomba (1967–1968)
- (Chile) Carlos Javier Mascaro (1969–1970)
- (Uruguay) Julio Kellman
- (El Salvador) Rigoberto Guzmán
- (Argentina) Gregorio Bundio
- (Argentina) Hugo Arias
- (El Salvador) Andrés “el doctorcito” Huezo
- Mario Osorto
