= C.D. Águila records and statistics =

C.D. Aguila is a Salvadoran professional association football club based in San Miguel. The club was formed in and played its first competitive match on July 27, 1958, when it played its first season in the Primera División. Aguila currently plays in the Primera División, the top tier of El Salvador football, and is one of three clubs, including Alianza F.C. and C.D. FAS, never to have been relegated from the league.

== Honours ==
As of 18 January 2024' Aguila have won 17 Primera División, one Copa Presidente and one CONCACAF Champions League trophies.

=== Domestic competitions ===
==== League ====
- Primera División and predecessors
  - Champions (17) : 1959, 1960–61, 1963–64, 1964, 1967–68, 1972, 1975–76, 1976–77, 1983, 1987–88, Apertura 1999, Apertura 2000, Clausura 2001, Clausura 2006, Clausura 2012, Clausura 2019, Apertura 2023
- Segunda División Salvadorean and predecessors
  - Champions (1) : 1958
- Tercera División Salvadorean and predecessors
  - Champions (1) : 1950

==== Cup ====
- Copa Presidente and predecessors
  - Winners (1): 2000
- Campeón de Campeones
  - Winners (1): 2018–2019
- Supacopa de Campeones
  - Winners (1): 2024

=== CONCACAF competitions ===
==== Official titles ====
- CONCACAF Champions' Cup
  - Champions (1) : 1976
- UNCAF Interclub Cup
  - Runners up (1) : 1973

== Players ==
=== Appearances ===
Competitive, professional matches only including substitution, number of appearances as a substitute appears in brackets.

Last updated - 18 July 2023

	Name	Years	Primera División	Finals	CCL	Total
1	(El Salvador) -	-	(-)	(-)	(-)	(-)
2	(El Salvador) Deris Umanzor	2005–2010, 2011-2017	429 (-)	(-)	(-)	(-)
3	(El Salvador) -	-	(-)	(-)	(-)	(-)
4	(El Salvador) Benji Villalobos	2006-Present	400 (1)	(-)	(-)	(-)
5	(El Salvador) -	-	(-)	(-)	(-)	(-)
6	(El Salvador) -	-	(-)	(-)	(-)	(-)
7	(El Salvador) -	-	(-)	(-)	(-)	(-)
8	(El Salvador) -	-	(-)	(-)	(-)	(-)
9	(El Salvador) -	-	(-)	(-)	(-)	(-)
10	(El Salvador) -	-	(-)	(-)	(-)	(-)
11	(El Salvador) -	-	(-)	(-)	(-)	(-)
12	(El Salvador) -	-	(-)	(-)	(-)	(-)
13	(El Salvador) -	-	(-)	(-)	(-)	(-)
14	(El Salvador) -	-	(-)	(-)	(-)	(-)
15	(El Salvador) -	-	(-)	(-)	(-)	(-)
16	(El Salvador) Alexander Campos	2003–2008	186 (-)	(-)	(-)	(-)
17	(El Salvador) -	-	(-)	(-)	(-)	(-)
18	(El Salvador) -	-	(-)	(-)	(-)	(-)
19	(El Salvador) -	-	(-)	(-)	(-)	(-)
20	(El Salvador) Isaac Zelaya	-2015	173 (-)	(-)	(-)	(-)

==== Others ====
- Youngest first-team player: 15 years, 151 days – (El Salvador) Jefferson Perla v Cacahuatique, Primera Division, 20 January 2025
- Oldest first team player: 38 years, 330 days – (El Salvador) Luis Ramírez Zapata v TBD, Primera Division, 1992
- Most appearances in Primera Division: TBD – (El Salvador) TBD
- Most appearances in Copa Presidente: TBD – (El Salvador) TBD
- Most appearances in International competitions: TBD – (El Salvador) TBD
- Most appearances in CONCACAF competitions: TBD – (El Salvador) TBD
- Most appearances in UNCAF competitions: TBD – (El Salvador) TBD
- Most appearances in CONCACAF Champions League: TBD – (El Salvador) TBD
- Most appearances in UNCAF Copa: TBD (El Salvador) TBD
- Most appearances in FIFA Club World Cup: 2

- (Brazil) Zózimo

- Most appearances as a foreign player in all competitions: TBD – (Brazil) TBD
- Most appearances as a foreign player in Primera Division: TBD – (Brazil) TBD
- Most consecutive League appearances: TBD – (El Salvador) TBD – from Month Day, Year at Month Day, Year
- Shortest appearance: –

=== Goalscorers ===
Competitive, professional matches only. Appearances, including substitutes, appear in brackets.

As of January 2022

	Name	Years	Primera División	Finals	CCL	Total
1	(El Salvador) Luis Ramírez Zapata	1971-1976, 1980-1992	(-)	(-)	(-)	182 (-)
2	(Panama) Nicolás Muñoz	2006-2008, 2010, 2010–2012, 2020-2021	(-)	(-)	(-)	140 (-)
3	(El Salvador) Félix Pineda	1971-1983	(-)	(-)	(-)	118 (-)
4	(Argentina) Hugo Coria	1989-1994	(-)	(-)	(-)	105 (-)
5	(El Salvador) Sergio de Jesus Mendez	1964-1970	(-)	(-)	(-)	83 (141)
6	(El Salvador) Alexander Campos	2003-2008	(-)	(-)	(-)	62 (186)
8	(Brazil) Antonio David Pinho	1968-1982	(-)	(-)	(-)	58 (-)
9	(Brazil) Mauro Núñez Bastos	2001-2003	(-)	(-)	(-)	55 (-)
10	(El Salvador) Rudis Corrales	2004-2010	(-)	(-)	(-)	50 (-)
11	(El Salvador) Juan José Polio	1967-1978	(-)	(-)	(-)	(-)
10	(El Salvador) -	-	(-)	(-)	(-)	(-)
11	(El Salvador) -	-	(-)	(-)	(-)	(-)

==== By competition ====
- Most goals scored in all competitions: TBD – (El Salvador) TBD, Year–Year
- Most goals scored in Primera Division: TBD – (El Salvador) TBD, Year–Year
- Most goals scored in Copa Presidente: TBD – (El Salvador) TBD, Year–Year
- Most goals scored in International competitions: 'TBD – (El Salvador) TBD, Year–Year
- Most goals scored in CONCACAF competitions: TBD – (El Salvador) TBD, Year–Year
- Most goals scored in UNCAF competitions: TBD – (El Salvador) TBD, Year–Year
- Most goals scored in CONCACAF Champions League: TBD – (El Salvador) TBD, Year–Year
- Most goals scored in UNCAF Cup: TBD – (El Salvador) TBD, Year–Year
- Most goals scored in FIFA World Cup: 1 – (El Salvador) TBD, 1982

==== In a single season ====
- Most goals scored in a season in all competitions: TBD – (El Salvador) TBD, Year–Year
- Most goals scored in a single Primera Division season: TBD – (El Salvador) TBD, Year–Year
- Most goals scored in a single Apertura/Clausura season: TBD – (El Salvador) TBD, Year–Year
- Most goals scored in a single Copa Presidente season: TBD – (El Salvador) TBD, Year–Year
- Most goals scored in a single CONCACAF Champions League season: TBD – (El Salvador) TBD, Year–Year
- Most goals scored in a single UNCAF Cup season: TBD – (El Salvador) TBD, Year–Year

==== In a single match ====
- Most goals scored in a League match: TBD
  - (El Salvador) TBD v TBD, Day Month Year
- Most goals scored in a Copa Presidente match: TBD
  - (El Salvador) TBD v TBD, Day Month Year
- Most goals scored in an Apertura/Clausura match: TBD
  - (El Salvador) TBD v TBD, Day Month Year
- Most goals scored in a CONCACAF Champions League match: 4
  - (El Salvador) TBD v TBD, Day Month Year
- Most goals scored in a UNCAF Cup match: 4
  - (El Salvador) TBD v TBD, Day Month Year

==== Others ====
- Youngest goalscorer: 17 years, 114 days – (El Salvador) TBD v TBD, Year Primera Division, Day Month Year
- Oldest goalscorer: – 38 years, 233 days (El Salvador) TBD v TBD, Year Primera Division, Day Month Year
- Most goals scored in CONCACAF Finals: TBD
  - (El Salvador) (El Salvador) TBD, four in TBD.
- Fastest goal:
  - 12 seconds – (El Salvador) TBD v TND, Primera Division, Day Month Year
- Fastest hat-trick: 8 minutes – (El Salvador) TBD v TBD, Year Primera Division, Day Month Year
- Most hat-tricks in Primera Division: TBD – (El Salvador) TBD, Year-Year
- Most hat-tricks in a single season: TBD – (El Salvador) TBD,2011–12 (7 times in league).

==== Historical goals ====
Goal	Name	Date	Match
1st in Primera Division	(El Salvador) TBD	June 1958	Aguila 2 – Atletico Constancia 0
100th	(El Salvador) TBD	Day Month Year	TBD 2 – TBD 5
200th	(El Salvador) TBD	Day Month Year	TBD 3 – TBD 1
300th	(El Salvador) TBD	Day Month Year	TBD 1 – TBD 3
400th	(El Salvador) TBD	Day Month Year	TBD 0 – TBD 5
500th	(El Salvador) TBD	Day Month Year	TBD 4 – TBD 3

=== Internationals ===
- First international for El Salvador: TBD v Guatemala (Day Month Year)
- Most international caps as an Aguila player: TBD – TBD, El Salvador
- Most international goals (total): 17 – Rudis Corrales, El Salvador
- Most international goals as an Aguila player: 12 – Rudis Corrales, El Salvador

=== Award winners ===
Top Goalscorer (TBD)

The following players have won the league top Goalscorer while playing for Aguila:

- (El Salvador) Salvador Zuleta (-) - 1963/1964
- (El Salvador) Luis Ramírez Zapata (23) - 1975-76
- (El Salvador) Luis Ramírez Zapata (-) - 1976–1977
- (Argentina) Hugo Coria (22) - 1991-92
- (Uruguay) Jorge Leonardo Garay (21) - 1996-1997
- (El Salvador) Waldir Guerra (9) – Apertura 1999
- (Brazil) Mauro Núñez Bastos (20) – Apertura 2001
- (Brazil) Mauro Núñez Bastos (15) – Clausura 2002
- (El Salvador) Alexander Campos (13) – Clausura 2003
- (El Salvador) Alexander Campos (11) – Apertura 2003
- (Panama) (El Salvador) Nicolás Muñoz (14) – Clausura 2007
- (Panama) (El Salvador) Nicolás Muñoz (15) – Apertura 2011
- (Panama) (El Salvador) Nicolás Muñoz (12) – Clausura 2012
- (Panama) (El Salvador) Nicolás Muñoz (12) – Apertura 2020
- (Colombia) Carlos Salazar (15) – 2023 Apertura

== Internationals ==
The following players represented their countries while playing for AGuila (the figure in brackets is the number of caps gained while an Aguila player. Many of these players also gained caps while at other clubs.) Figures for active players (in bold) last updated 2021

Brazil

- Zózimo

Chile

- Carlos Verdugo

Colombia

- Luis Zuleta

Costa Rica

- Álvaro Cascante
- Guillermo Elizondo
- Guillermo Otárola
- Tulio Quirós
- Alejandro Sequeira
- José Luis Soto
- Walter Pearson Wilson

El Salvador

- Jonathan Águila
- Arturo Albarran
- William Torres Alegría
- Misael Alfaro
- Fabricio Alfaro
- Rodolfo Álfaro
- Elvin Alvarado
- Francisco Álvarez
- Alexander Amaya
- Luis Anaya
- Raúl Díaz Arce
- Reynaldo Argueta
- Gilberto Baires
- Juan Barahona
- Juan Francisco Barraza
- Melvin Barrera
- Cristián Bautista
- Marvin Benítez
- Tereso Benítez
- Léster Blanco
- Darwin Bonilla
- Jorge Bucaro
- Erber Burgos
- Erick Cabalceta
- William Torres Cabrera
- Alexander Campos
- Otoniel Carranza
- Melvin Cartagena
- Mario Castillo
- Ibsen Castro
- Julio Alexander Castro
- Darwin Ceren
- Oscar Ceren
- Lizandro Claros
- Diego Coca
- Carlos Francisco Contreras
- Luis Contreras
- Dustin Corea
- Carlos Coreas
- Salvador Coreas
- Víctor Coreas
- Magdonio Corrales
- Rudis Corrales
- Melvin Cruz
- Jaime Vladimir Cubías
- David Díaz
- Marcelo Díaz
- Álex Erazo
- Cristián Esnal
- Fredy Espinoza
- José Luis Ferrera
- Josué Flores
- Víctor Manuel Fuentes
- Josué Galdámez
- Jorge Garay
- Raul Garcia
- Víctor García
- Xavier García
- Ernesto Góchez
- Juan José Gómez
- Edwin González
- Fredy González
- Marvin González
- Tomás Granitto
- Waldir Guerra
- Oscar Gustavo Guerrero
- Leonel Guevara
- Isidro Gutiérrez
- Henry Hernandez
- José Roberto Hernández
- Luis Miguel Hernández
- Reynaldo Hernández
- Jairo Henríquez
- Mardoqueo Henríquez
- Julio Herrera
- Wilfredo Iraheta
- Kilmar Jiménez
- Francisco Jovel
- Patricio de Jesús Mancia
- Bryan Landaverde
- Alexander Larin
- César Larios
- Armando Lazo
- Luis Óscar Lazo
- Miguel Lemus
- Dagoberto López
- Amadeo Machado
- Shawn Martin
- Elmer Martínez
- Juan Ramón Martínez
- Julio Martinez
- Roberto Guadalupe Martínez
- Gerson Mayen
- Rene Mena
- Francisco Medrano
- Rommel Mejía
- Kevin Melara
- Sergio Méndez
- Alexander Méndoza
- Carlos Menjívar
- Richard Menjivar
- Víctor Merino
- Marcelo Messias
- Mario Mayén Meza
- Edgardo Mira
- Conrado Miranda
- Baltazar Mirón
- Jorge Morán Mojica
- José Abraham Monterrosa
- Miguel Montes
- Luis Guevara Mora
- Gilberto Murgas
- Sergio Iván Muñoz
- Nelson Nerio
- Nildeson
- Fredy Orellana
- Saturnino Osorio
- Santos Ortíz
- Alfredo Pacheco
- Martín Paredes
- Emiliano Pedrozo
- Alfonso Perla
- Denis Pineda
- Marcelo Posadas
- Eliseo Quintanilla
- Mauricio Quintanilla
- Nelson Quintanilla
- Manuel Ramos y Ramos
- Marvin Ramos
- José Nelson Reyes
- Kevin Reyes
- Williams Reyes
- Santos Rivera
- Jorge Rodríguez
- Ronald Rodríguez
- Henry Romero
- Osael Romero
- Héctor Rosales
- David Rugamas
- Kevin Sagastizado
- Eliseo Salamanca
- Yuvini Salamanca
- Edwin Sánchez
- Ramón Sánchez
- Kevin Santamaría
- Allexon Saravia
- Julio Sibrián
- Walter Soto
- Jorge Suárez
- Marlon Trejo
- Fausto Torres
- Rolando Torres
- Deris Umanzor
- Emerson Umaña
- Irvin Valdez
- Sergio Valencia
- José Alfredo Vásquez
- Styven Vásquez
- Martín Velasco
- Víctor Velásquez
- Joaquín Ventura
- Vladan Vićević
- Eduardo Vigil
- Jorge Milton Villa
- Benji Villalobos
- Rómulo Villalobos
- Luis Ramírez Zapata
- Isaac Zelaya
- Selvin Zelaya

Grenada

- Keith Fletcher

Guatemala

- Fulgencio Dionel Bordón
- Adán Paniagua
- Ricardo Piccinini
- Oscar Sánchez

Honduras

- Juan Francisco Castro
- Arnold Cruz
- Ramón Maradiaga
- Elison Rivas
- Christian Santamaría
- Fabio Ulloa
- Víctor Zúñiga

Jamaica

- Nicholas Addlery
- Jermaine Anderson
- Keithy Simpson

Mexico

- Ismael Rodríguez

Nicaragua

- Rudi Sobalvarro Rivera
- Roger Mayorga

Panama

- Miguel Camargo
- Richard Dixon
- Eduardo Jiménez
- Julio Medina III
- Nicolás Muñoz
- Juan Ramón Solís
- Sergio Thompson

Puerto Rico

- Héctor Ramos

Peru

- Agustín Castillo
- Paul Cominges

Trinidad and Tobago

- Jomal Williams

Togo

- Fabinho Azevedo

== Club records ==
- Record Victory: 10-0 vs Juventud Independiente, August 24, 2008 (Primera Division) & 13-0 vs. C.D. Titan, 1958 (Segunda Division)
- Record Defeat: 1-8 vs Atletico Marte, December 5, 1993
- Record Victory in the El Clasico: 5-0 vs C.D. FAS, 3 March 1968
- Record Defeat in the El Clasico: 1-7 vs FAS, 16 May 2004
- Record Victory in CONCACAF Competition: Aguila 6-1 Diriangen FC 1976
- Record Defeat in CONCACAF Competition: Santos Laguna 5-0 C.D. Aguila, 2012–13 CONCACAF Champions League
- Record Victory in UNCAF Competition: Aguila 3-0 Saprissa 1976, Once Municipal 3-6 Águila 1977, Águila 3-0 Saprissa 1977,
- Record Defeat in UNCAF Competition: Comunicaciones 7-1 Águila, 1983
- Record High Attendance:

=== Streaks ===
- Most consecutive wins: 11 Games, 2023 Clausura – 2023 Apertura
- Most consecutive Draws:
- Most consecutive Loses:
- Most games Undefeated:

=== Other records ===
- Most Goals In a Regular Season: 49, (Apertura 2001)
- Longest Period Without Conceding a Goal:
- First El Clasico and First Aguila Goalscorer: Saúl Molina 41st min, 17 May 1959
- First official game of CD Aguila: vs. Titan 2-2, 14 October 1956 in San Miguel
- First goalscorer of CD Aguila: Juan Antonio "Maquinita" Merlos vs. Titan, 14 October 1956
- Highest record signing: Zózimo who signed from Porvenir Miraflores for a fee of US$500,000 in 1967.

== International representation ==
=== Historical matches ===
20 December 1959 Friendly	Aguila	0-1	Austria Wien	San Salvador, El Salvador
	Nil		Ernst Fiala	Stadium: Estadio Nacional Flor Blanca

January 7, 1962 Friendly	Aguila	0-0	Cruzeiro	San Salvador, El Salvador
	Nil		Nil	Stadium: Estadio Nacional Flor Blanca

1975 Friendly	Aguila	0-1	Deportivo Municipal	San Miguel, El Salvador
	Nil		TBD 90'	Stadium: Estadio Juan Francisco Barraza

January 9, 1976 Friendly	Aguila	1-1	Gimnasia y Esgrima	San Salvador, El Salvador
	Luis Ramírez Zapata		Magio	Stadium: Estadio Cuscatlán

February 5, 1988 Friendly	Aguila	2-2	Gremio FC	San Miguel, El Salvador
	Luis Guelmo 24'; Néstor Doroni 32'		Lima 37'; Helinho 58'	Stadium: Estadio Juan Francisco Barraza

August 14, 1988 Friendly (Copa Camel 1988)	Aguila	3-4	Leones Negros UdeG	Santa Ana, California, United States
	Luis Guelmo 58' 80'; Rosales 71'		Octavio Mora 25'; Salvador Reyes 45'; Alfonso Sosa 54'; Daniel Guzman 74'	Stadium: Santa Ana Bowl

July 21, 2001 Friendly	Aguila	3-5	Alianza Lima	East Rutherford, New York, United States
	Eliseo Quintanilla 52'; Waldir Guerra 71'; Alex Dickson 89'		Eduardo Esidio 10'; Waldir Saenz 45' 49'; Rafael Gallardo 70'; Jefferson Farfan 90'	Stadium: Giants Stadium

2004 Friendly	Aguila	3-1	Denmark	Los Angeles, California, United States
	Own goal Rudis Corrales; Alexander Campos		Tony Vickman
