= Primera División de Fútbol Profesional – Clausura 2013 =

Primera División de Fútbol de El Salvador
- Season: Clausura 2013
- Champions: Firpo (10th Title)
- Relegated: Once Municipal
- Matches: 90
- Goals: 223 (2.48 per match)
- Top goalscorer: Anel Canales (10)
- Biggest home win: Alianza 7-0 Once Municipal (10 March 2013)
- Biggest away win: Firpo 0-3 Alianza (23 February 2013); Águila 1-4 Atlético Marte (27 February 2013)
- Highest scoring: Independiente 6-1 Isidro Metapán (10 February 2013); Alianza 7-0 Once Municipal (10 March 2013)
- Longest winning run: 4 games by: FAS and Alianza
- Longest unbeaten run: 6 games by: FAS, Alianza, Independiente, and Isidro Metapán
- Longest winless run: 15 games by: UES
- Longest losing run: 6 games by: UES

The Clausura 2013 season was the 30th edition of Primera División de Fútbol de El Salvador since its establishment of an Apertura and Clausura format. Isidro Metapán were the defending champions. The league consisted of 10 teams, each playing a home and away game against the other clubs for a total of 18 games per club during the season. The top four teams at the end of the regular season took part in the playoffs.

== Stadia and locations ==
Location of teams in Apertura 2012/Clausura 2013

Team	Home city	Stadium	Capacity
Águila	San Miguel	Juan Francisco Barraza	10,000
Alianza	San Salvador	Estadio Cuscatlán	45,925
Atlético Marte	San Salvador	Estadio Cuscatlán	45,925
FAS	Santa Ana	Estadio Óscar Quiteño	15,000
Isidro Metapán	Metapán	Estadio Jorge Calero Suárez	8,000
Juventud Independiente	San Juan Opico	Complejo Municipal	5,000
Luís Ángel Firpo	Usulután	Estadio Sergio Torres	5,000
Once Municipal	Ahuachapán	Estadio Simeón Magaña	5,000
Santa Tecla	Santa Tecla	Estadio Las Delicias	10,000
UES	San Salvador	Estadio Universitario UES	10,000

=== Personnel and sponsoring ===
Team	Chairman	Head coach	Kitmaker	Shirt sponsor
Águila	(El Salvador) Julio Sosa	(El Salvador) Victor Coreas	Diadora	Mister Donut, Volkswagen, Impressa Repuestos, Soccerway
Alianza	(El Salvador) Lisandro Pohl	(Argentina) Ramiro Cepeda	Lotto	Tigo, SINAI, Maseca
Atlético Marte	(El Salvador) Hugo Carrillo	(Argentina) Jorge Alberto García	Galaxia	Rosvill, Foskrol, La Curaçao, UFG, Vive
FAS	(El Salvador) Rafael Villacorta	(El Salvador) Carlos Recinos	Mitre	Pepsi, Farmacia San Lorenzo, Alba Petróleos, Continental Motor
Isidro Metapán	(El Salvador) Rafael Morataya	(El Salvador) Edwin Portillo	Milán (Jaguar Sportic)	Grupo Bimbo, Tigo, Arroz San Pedro, Holan
Juventud Independiente	(El Salvador) Romeo Barillas	(El Salvador) Juan Ramón Sánchez	Milán (Jaguar Sportic)	Alcaldía Municipal de San Juan Opico, Ria, CP Portillo
Luis Ángel Firpo	(El Salvador) Enrique Escobar	(El Salvador) Edgar Henriquez "Kiko"	Joma	Pilsener, Volkswagen, Diana, Tigo
Once Municipal	(El Salvador)	(Argentina) Juan Andres Sarulyte	Milan (Jaguar Sportic)	LA GEO, Milan (Jaguar Sportic), Tropigas
Santa Tecla	(El Salvador) Óscar Ortiz	(El Salvador) William Renderos Iraheta	Galaxia	Mister Donut
UES	(El Salvador) Rufino Quesada	(El Salvador) Jorge Abrego	Galaxia	Alba Petróleos

== Managerial changes ==
=== Before the start of the season ===
Team	Outgoing manager	Manner of departure	Date of vacancy	Replaced by	Date of appointment	Position in table
FAS	(Peru) Agustín Castillo	Resigned to become the national team coach	18 December 2012	(El Salvador) Carlos Recinos	12 December 2012	3rd (Apertura 2012)
Santa Tecla	(El Salvador) Guillermo Rivera	Resigned to become the assistant coach	18 December 2012	(El Salvador) William Renderos Iraheta	18 December 2012	7th (Apertura 2012)
C.D. FAS	(El Salvador) Carlos Recinos	Resigned due to problems with players	January 2013	(El Salvador) William Osorio	January 2013	N/A

=== During the season ===
Team	Outgoing manager	Manner of departure	Date of vacancy	Replaced by	Date of appointment	Position in table
C.D. Águila	(El Salvador) Víctor Coreas	Sacked	April 2013	(El Salvador) Omar Sevilla	April 2013	N/A

== League table ==
Pos	Team	Pld	W	D	L	GF	GA	GD	Pts	Qualification
1	FAS	18	11	3	4	29	16	+13	36	Qualification for playoffs
2	Luis Ángel Firpo	18	10	2	6	19	19	0	32	Qualification for playoffs
3	Alianza	18	8	7	3	33	15	+18	31	Qualification for playoffs
4	Juventud Independiente	18	8	5	5	31	20	+11	29	Qualification for playoffs
5	Santa Tecla	18	8	5	5	24	17	+7	29	
6	Isidro Metapán	18	6	8	4	19	20	−1	26	
7	Atlético Marte	18	6	3	9	27	25	+2	21	
8	Once Municipal	18	5	5	8	17	29	−12	20	
9	Águila	18	3	5	10	13	26	−13	14	
10	UES	18	1	5	12	11	35	−24	8	

Updated to match(es) played on 14 March 2013. Source: elgrafico.com soccerway.com
Rules for classification: 1) points; 2) goal difference; 3) number of goals scored.

== Results ==
Home \ Away	ÁGU	ALI	ATM	FAS	FIR	MET	JUV	OMU	STE	UES
Águila		0–1	1–4	0–1	0–2	0–0	2–2	2–1	1–1	1–0
Alianza	5–1		1–1	3–2	0–1	1–1	1–1	7–0	0–0	2–0
Atlético Marte	2–0	3–3		2–3	1–1	2–1	2–1	4–1	0–1	3–1
C.D. FAS	1–0	2–0	3–1		1–2	0–2	1–0	4–1	1–0	3–0
Luis Ángel Firpo	0–2	0–3	1–0	0–1		2–1	0–3	0–2	2–1	1–0
Isidro Metapán	2–1	1–1	1–0	1–1	0–0		1–0	2–1	1–1	2–1
Juventud Independiente	2–1	1–2	2–1	1–1	1–2	6–1		1–0	2–1	4–1
Once Municipal	1–1	0–0	1–0	2–1	1–2	1–0	1–1		1–0	0–0
Santa Tecla	1–0	1–0	2–1	1–1	2–1	0–0	1–2	3–2		4–0
C.D. Universidad de El Salvador	0–0	0–3	1–0	1–2	0–2	2–2	1–1	1–1	2–4	

Updated to match(es) played on 14 March 2013. Source: Soccerway
Legend: Blue = home team win; Yellow = draw; Red = away team win.

== Playoffs ==
Semifinals
1	C.D. FAS	1	1	2
4	Juventud Independiente	2	0	2
2	Firpo	0	1	1
3	Alianza	1	0	1

Final
1	C.D. FAS	0
2	Firpo	3

=== Semi-finals ===
==== First leg ====
12 May 2013
UTC−6

Juventud Independiente	2–1	FAS
Esnal 35'; Céren 59'	Report	Águila 2'

Estadio Las Delicias, Santa Tecla
Referee: Edenilson Ventura

12 May 2013
UTC−6

Alianza	1–0	Luis Ángel Firpo
De Paz 24'	Report

Estadio Cuscatlán, San Salvador
Referee: Edenílson Ventura

==== Second leg ====
18 May 2013
UTC−6

FAS	1–0	Juventud Independiente
Águila 67'	Report

Estadio Oscar Quiteño, Santa Ana

19 May 2013
UTC−6

Luis Ángel Firpo	1–0	Alianza
Monteagudo 47'	Report

Estadio Sergio Torres, Usulután

=== Final ===
May 2013
UTC−6

FAS	0–3	Luis Ángel Firpo
		Anel Canales 7' (pen.); Medardo Guevara 55'; Marlon Trejo 66'

Estadio Cuscatlán, San Salvador
Referee: Jaime Carpio

FAS:
GK	25	(El Salvador) Óscar Arroyo	(yellow card) 31'
DF	3	(El Salvador) Marvin González	(yellow card) 5'
DF	6	(El Salvador) José Granadino	Red card
DF	22	(El Salvador) Carlos Carrillo
DF	4	(El Salvador) Ramon Flores	Red card
MF	7	(El Salvador) Jorge Morán	(substituted off) 71'
MF	26	(El Salvador) Elder Figueroa	(yellow card) 50'
MF	19	(El Salvador) Gerson Mayen	(substituted off) 69'
MF	15	(El Salvador) Alexander Larín	(yellow card) 9'
FW	11	(El Salvador) Williams Reyes
FW	9	(Argentina) Alejandro Bentos	(substituted off) 59'
Substitutes:
MF	8	(El Salvador) Cristian Álvarez	(substituted on) 59'
FW	16	(El Salvador) Jonathan Águila	(substituted on) 69'
MF	13	(El Salvador) Carlos Aparicio	(substituted on) 71'
Manager:
(El Salvador) William Osorio

Firpo:
GK	1	(El Salvador) Dagoberto Portillo
DF	2	(El Salvador) Xavier García
DF	3	(El Salvador) Mauricio Quintanilla
DF	4	(El Salvador) Carlos Monteagudo
DF	21	(El Salvador) Marlon Trejo	66'
MF	24	(El Salvador) Dennis Alas
MF	17	(El Salvador) Marlon Martínez	(substituted off) 52'
MF	8	(El Salvador) Diego Chavarría	(yellow card) 62'
MF	10	(Uruguay) Martín Mederos	(yellow card) 9' (substituted off) 61'
FW	9	(Panama) Anel Canales	7'
FW	11	(El Salvador) Medardo Guevara	(yellow card) 31' (goal) 55' (substituted off) 73'
Substitutes:
MF	14	(El Salvador) Jorge Sánchez	(substituted on) 52'
MF	15	(El Salvador) Cristian Portillo	(substituted on) 61'
MF	6	(El Salvador) César Vásquez	(substituted on) 73' (yellow card) 74'
Manager:
(Argentina) Roberto Gamarra

Clausura 2013 champions

10th title

== Player statistics ==
=== Top scorers ===
Rank	Scorer	Club	Goals
1	(Panama) Anel Canales	Luis Ángel Firpo	10
2	(Panama) Nicolás Muñoz	Isidro Metapán	9
3	(Dominican Republic) Jonathan Faña	Alianza	8
3	(El Salvador) Williams Reyes	FAS	8
5	(El Salvador) Darwin Ceren	Juventud Independiente	7
5	(El Salvador) Osael Romero	Alianza	7
7	(El Salvador) Odir Flores	Alianza	6
7	(El Salvador) Kevin Santamaria	Santa Tecla	6
7	(El Salvador) Juan Campos	Águila	6
10	(El Salvador) Jonathan Águila	FAS	5
10	(El Salvador) Fabricio Alfaro	Santa Tecla	5
10	(El Salvador) Cesar Larios	Atlético Marte	5

Updated to games played on 25 May 2013.
Post-season goals are not included, only regular season goals.

=== Assists table ===
Rank	Player	Club	Assists

=== Goalkeepers ===
Goalkeeper	Goals	Matches	Average	Team
(El Salvador) Luis Contreras	5	8	0.63	FAS
(El Salvador) Miguel Montes	5	7	0.71	Alianza
(El Salvador) Jassir Deras	9	8	1.13	Juventud Independiente
(El Salvador) Dennis Salinas	7	6	1.17	Luis Ángel Firpo
(United States) (El Salvador) Derby Carillo	6	5	1.20	Santa Tecla
(El Salvador) Diego Duarte	8	6	1.33	Atlético Marte
(El Salvador) Benji Villalobos	12	8	1.50	Águila
(El Salvador) David Aguilar	6	4	1.50	UES
(El Salvador) Fidel Mondragón	14	8	1.75	Isidro Metapán
(El Salvador) Yimmy Cuéllar	16	8	2.00	Once Municipal

=== Bookings ===
Rank	Team	Yellow card	Red card	Total
1	Isidro Metapán	12	2	14
2	FAS	17	0	17
3	Alianza	15	3	18
3	Águila	16	2	18
3	Once Municipal	16	2	18
3	UES	17	1	18
7	Juventud Independiente	17	3	20
8	Luis Ángel Firpo	21	0	21
9	Atlético Marte	25	1	26
10	Santa Tecla	25	3	28
	Total	181	17	198

=== Hat-tricks ===
Player	For	Against	Result	Date
(Dominican Republic) Jonathan Faña	Alianza	Once Municipal	0–7	March 10, 2013

=== Season statistics ===
==== Scoring ====
- First goal of the season: (Panama) Anel Canales for Luis Ángel Firpo against UES, 42 minutes (2 February 2013)
- Fastest goal in a match: 1 minutes – (El Salvador) Alexander Campos for Juventud Independiente against C.D. Luis Ángel Firpo (27 February 2013)
- Goal scored at the latest point in a match:
- First penalty Kick of the season: (Brazil) Danilo Oliveira for Once Municipal against Luis Ángel Firpo, 86 minutes (9 February 2013)
- Widest winning margin: 7 goals
  - Alianza 7–0 Once Municipal (10 March 2013)
- First hat-trick of the season: (Dominican Republic) Jonathan Faña for Alianza against Once Municipal (10 March 2013)
- First own goal of the season: (El Salvador) Mardoqueo Henriquez (Águila) for Atlético Marte (27 February 2013)
- Most goals by one team in a match: 7 Goals
  - Alianza 7–0 Once Municipal (10 March 2013)
- Most goals in one half by one team:
- Most goals scored by losing team: 2 Goals
  - Santa Tecla 3–2 Once Municipal (2 February 2013)
- Most goals by one player in a single match: 3 Goals
  - (Dominican Republic) Jonathan Faña for Alianza against Once Municipal (10 March 2013)

==== Discipline ====
- First yellow card of the season:
- First red card of the season:

== List of foreign players in the league ==
This is a list of foreign players in Clausura 2012. The following players:

1. have played at least one apertura game for the respective club.
2. have not been capped for the El Salvador national football team on any level, independently from the birthplace

A new rule was introduced a few season ago, that clubs can only have three foreign players per club and can only add a new player if there is an injury or player/s is released.

C.D. Águila

- (Cuba) Yaikel Pérez
- (Brazil) Tiago dos Santos Roberto
- (Brazil) Heslley Couto

Alianza F.C.

- (Dominican Republic) Jonathan Faña
- (Mexico) Jairo Araujo
- (Panama) Orlando Rodríguez

Atlético Marte

- (Argentina) Daniel Ruiz
- (Colombia) Cristian Gil Mosquera
- (Argentina) Gonzalo Mazzia

Juventud Independiente

- (Uruguay) Juan Carlos Reyes
- (Colombia) Mario Alberto Abadía

C.D. FAS

- (Argentina) Alejandro Bentos
- (Mexico) Juan Carlos Enríquez

(player released mid season)

C.D. Luis Ángel Firpo

- (Panama) Anel Canales
- (Uruguay) Martin Mederos
- (Panama) Luis Mendoza

A.D. Isidro Metapán

- (Honduras) Ernesto Aquino
- (Uruguay) Jorge Ramírez
- (Brazil) Junio Pinto Catarin

Once Municipal

- (Brazil) Danilo Oliveira
- (Brazil) Carlos Regis Araujo

Santa Tecla F.C.

- (Argentina) Facundo Nicolás Simioli
- (Uruguay) Christian Vaquero
- (Panama) Rogelio Juárez

UES

- None

== Aggregate table ==
Pos	Team	Pld	W	D	L	GF	GA	GD	Pts	Qualification or relegation
1	FAS	36	20	9	7	56	32	+24	69	
2	Alianza	36	18	11	7	71	34	+37	65	
3	Isidro Metapán	36	17	11	8	56	45	+11	62	Qualification for 2013–14 CONCACAF Champions League
4	Luis Ángel Firpo	36	17	6	13	45	43	+2	57	Qualification for 2013–14 CONCACAF Champions League
5	Santa Tecla	36	13	11	12	48	50	−2	50	
6	Juventud Independiente	36	12	12	12	58	54	+4	48	
7	Águila	36	12	9	15	42	42	0	45	
8	Atlético Marte	36	13	5	18	55	50	+5	44	
9	UES	36	5	13	18	31	60	−29	28	
10	Once Municipal (R)	36	6	7	23	33	82	−49	25	Relegation to Segunda División

Updated to match(es) played on 14 March 2013. Source: elgrafico.com
Rules for classification: 1) points; 2) goal difference; 3) number of goals scored.
(R) Relegated
