= Luis Ramírez Zapata =

Salvadoran footballer (born 1954)

Personal information
- Full name: Luis Baltazar Ramírez Zapata
- Date of birth: 6 January 1954 (age 72)
- Place of birth: San Salvador, El Salvador
- Height: 1.75 m (5 ft 9 in)
- Position: Forward

Youth career
- 1966–1968: Córdova
- 1968–1969: La Predilecta
- 1969–1971: CD Dragón

Senior career*
Years	Team	Apps	(Gls)
1971–1976	CD Águila		(182)
1977–1978	Cartaginés	45	(11)
1978	Puebla FC		
1979	Alianza FC		
1979	Platense FC		
1980–1992	CD Águila		
1990	Washington Diplomats	15	(4)
1992	CD Atlético Marte		

International career^{‡}
1971–1989	El Salvador	58	(16)

Managerial career
- 2007: CD Águila
- 2009: CD Atlético Balboa
- 2010: ADI FC
- * Club domestic league appearances and goals as of 2007 ‡ National team caps and goals as of 26 December 2006

Luis Baltazar Ramírez Zapata (born 6 January 1954) is a retired Salvadoran football forward, who played for the El Salvador national team for nearly two decades.

== Club career ==
Nicknamed El Pelé, he spent nearly 20 years playing for Salvadoran club Águila. He started with Águila, after being recommended by Brazilian technical director Arnaldo Da Silva, under the legendary Juan Francisco Barraza, before leaving to join other clubs and later in his career make a return to the San Miguel-based club. He also would go on to play for Atlético Marte and Alianza in his homeland El Salvador and spent time abroad playing for Cartaginés in Costa Rica, scoring 11 goals, and Puebla in Mexico. In 1990, he played for the Washington Diplomats of the American Professional Soccer League.

== International career ==
Zapata made his international debut aged 17 years, 8 months and 9 days against Nicaragua, he also scored on debut, becoming the youngest Salvadorian to score on debut, holding the record for 53 years. The record was broken on 31 May, 2025 by Brandon Stanley Ramirez who scored on debut aged 16 years, 8 months and 26 days against Guatemala, Ramírez represented El Salvador at the 1975 Pan American Games in Mexico. He also represented his country in 24 FIFA World Cup qualification matches and was a member of the El Salvador team at the 1982 World Cup in Spain. During the tournament, he scored their only goal in World Cup history. It came in the infamous 10–1 defeat to Hungary on 15 June 1982, which remains the single biggest loss for a team in the competition's history.

Ramírez Zapata scored 16 goals for the El Salvador national team from 1971 to 1989.

His final international game was an August 1989 FIFA World Cup qualification match against Trinidad & Tobago.

=== International goals ===
Scores and results list El Salvador's goal tally first.

No	Date	Venue	Opponent	Score	Result	Competition
1.	15 September 1971	Estadio Nacional Flor Blanca, San Salvador, El Salvador	Nicaragua	1–0	1–0	1971 CONCACAF Championship qualification
2.	9 February 1976	Estadio Nacional Flor Blanca, San Salvador, El Salvador	Hungary	1–?	1–2	Friendly
3.	2 May 1976	Estadio Revolución, Panama City, Panama	Panama	1–0	1–1	1977 CONCACAF Championship qualification
4.	1 August 1976	Estadio Cuscatlán, San Salvador, El Salvador	Panama	1–0	4–1	1977 CONCACAF Championship qualification
5.	1 August 1976	Estadio Cuscatlán, San Salvador, El Salvador	Panama	2–0	4–1	1977 CONCACAF Championship qualification
6.	1 August 1976	Estadio Cuscatlán, San Salvador, El Salvador	Panama	4–0	4–1	1977 CONCACAF Championship qualification
7.	15 December 1976	Estadio Nacional de Costa Rica, San José, Costa Rica	Costa Rica	1–1	1–1	1977 CONCACAF Championship qualification
8.	8 October 1977	Estadio Tecnológico, Monterrey, Mexico	Canada	1–0	2–1	1977 CONCACAF Championship
9.	8 October 1977	Estadio Tecnológico, Monterrey, Mexico	Canada	2–0	2–1	1977 CONCACAF Championship
10.	30 September 1980	Estadio Cuscatlán, San Salvador, El Salvador	Guatemala	2–1	3–2	Friendly
11.	15 June 1982	Estadio Manuel Martínez Valero, Elche, Spain	Hungary	1–5	1–10	1982 FIFA World Cup
12.	27 June 1984	Estadio Cuscatlán, San Salvador, El Salvador	Guatemala	3–1	3–1	Friendly
13.	5 August 1984	Juan Ramón Loubriel Stadium, Bayamón, Puerto Rico	Puerto Rico	1–0	3–0	1985 CONCACAF Championship qualification
14.	27 February 1985	Estadio Cuscatlán, San Salvador, El Salvador	Suriname	2–0	3–0	1985 CONCACAF Championship
15.	16 October 1988	Estadio Cuscatlán, San Salvador, El Salvador	Netherlands Antilles	4–0	5–0	1989 CONCACAF Championship qualification
16.	16 October 1988	Estadio Cuscatlán, San Salvador, El Salvador	Netherlands Antilles	5–0	5–0	1989 CONCACAF Championship qualification

== Managerial career and personal life ==
His first job as a manager was at Águila, where he replaced Panamanian coach Gary Stempel in 2007. After his own dismissal, he coached Atlético Balboa and Salvadoran second division side ADI F.C., before joining the Department of Culture and Sports of the San Miguel mayorship. He was sacked by the municipal council in October 2011.

== Honours ==
=== Club honours ===
==== As a player ====
- Águila
  - Primera División (5): 1972, 1975–76, 1976–77, 1983, 1987–88
  - CONCACAF Champions' Cup (1): 1976

==== Individual ====
- Primera División Golden Boot (2): 1975-76, 1976-77
