= 1975–76 Primera División de El Salvador =

Primera División de Fútbol Profesional
- Season: 1975–76
- Champions: Aguila (7th Title)
- Relegated: Municipal Limeno

The 1975–76 Primera División de Fútbol Profesional season is the th tournament of El Salvador's Primera División since its establishment of the National League system in 1948. The tournament began on 6 April 1975 and finished on 25 January 1976. Aguila secured the club first Primera División title after defeating Alianza F.C. in two series.

== Team Information ==
=== Personnel and sponsoring ===
Team	Chairman	Head coach	Captain	Kitmaker	Shirt sponsor
ANTEL	(El Salvador) TBD	(Brazil) Jorge Tupinambá	(El Salvador) TBD	TBD	TBD
Águila	(El Salvador) TBD	(El Salvador) Conrado Miranda	(El Salvador) TBD	TBD	TBD
Alianza	(El Salvador) TBD	(Chile) Ricardo Sepúlveda	(El Salvador) TBD	Nil	Nil
Atlético Marte	(El Salvador) TBD	(Chile) Julio Marcos Baldovino	(El Salvador) TBD	TBD	TBD
FAS	(El Salvador) TBD	(El Salvador) Mauricio Mora	(El Salvador) TBD	Nil	Nil
Luis Angel Firpo	(El Salvador) TBD	(Chile) Jorge Venegas	(El Salvador) TBD	TBD	TBD
Municipal Limeno	(El Salvador) TBD	(El Salvador) Juan Francisco Barraza	(El Salvador) TBD	TBD	TBD
Negocios Internacionales/Juventud Olímpica	(El Salvador) TBD	(El Salvador) Victor Manuel Ochoa	(El Salvador) TBD	TBD	TBD
Platense	(El Salvador) TBD	(Argentina) Juan Quarterone	(El Salvador) TBD	TBD	TBD
Sonsonate	(El Salvador) TBD	(Chile) Carlos Campuzano Ramos	(El Salvador) TBD	TBD	TBD
Tapachulteca	(El Salvador) TBD	(El Salvador) Mauricio Rodriguez	(El Salvador) TBD	TBD	TBD
Universidad	(El Salvador) TBD	(Chile) Carlos Javier Mascaró	(El Salvador) TBD	TBD	TBD

== Notable events ==
=== Notable death from January 1975 season and January 1976 season ===
The following people associated with the Primera Division have died between the middle of 2022 and middle of 2023.

- TBD (ex player_

=== Change of team ===
On 19 September 1975 Negocios Internacionales decided to sell their spot to a new ownership group which rebranded themselves back to Juventud Olímpica.

=== New stadium ===
The new national stadium Estadio Cuscatlán opened in July, 1975; however the stadium held its first division game on 19 October 1975 with Platense defeating Juventud Olimpico 2–1, with Rafael Bucaro scored the first goal in the stadium.

== Managerial changes ==
=== During the season ===
Team	Outgoing manager	Manner of departure	Date of vacancy	Replaced by	Date of appointment	Position in table
Sonsonate	(Chile) Carlos Campuzano Ramos	Sacked	24 April 1974	(Argentina) Gregorio Bundio	25 April 1974	
FAS	(El Salvador) Mauricio Mora	Resigned	22 May 1975	(Argentina) Raul Miralles	23 May 1975	
Municipal Limeno	(El Salvador) Juan Francisco Barraza	Resigned	3 July 1975	(El Salvador) Luis “Chispo” Santana	July 1975	
LA Firpo	(Chile) Jorge Venegas	Sacked	July 1975	(El Salvador) Raúl Magaña	24 July 1975	
ANTEL	(Brazil) Jorge Tupinambá	Sacked	July 1975	(El Salvador) TBD	July 1975	
Negocios Internacionels	(El Salvador) Victor Manuel Ochoa	Sacked	1975	(Argentina) (Chile) Luis Grill Prieto	1975	
Juventud Olímpica	(Argentina) (Chile) Luis Grill Prieto	Club sold their spot	September 1975	(El Salvador) Julio “Búho” Ruano, Gualberto “Pulpo” Fernández and René Toledo Castro	September 1975	
Alianza	(Chile) Ricardo Sepúlveda	Sacked	22 September 1975	(Argentina) Mario Rey	23 September 1975	
Juventud Olímpica	(El Salvador) Julio “Búho” Ruano, Gualberto “Pulpo” Fernández and René Toledo Castro	Sacked	October 1975	(El Salvador) Jorge Tupinambá	October 1975	
Atletico Marte	(Chile) Julio Marcos Baldovino	Sacked	October 1975	(Chile) Ricardo Sepúlveda	November 1975	

== League standings ==
Pos	Team	Pld	W	D	L	GF	GA	GD	Pts	Qualification or relegation
1	C.D. Aguila	33	22	5	6	79	41	+38	49	Champion
2	C.D. FAS	33	18	7	8	55	38	+17	43	
3	Alianza F.C.	33	18	5	10	53	32	+21	41	
4	UES	33	17	6	10	53	40	+13	40	
5	Platense	33	17	5	11	53	41	+12	39	
6	Sonsonate	33	16	6	11	40	48	−8	38	
7	Tapachulteca FC	33	13	5	15	39	49	−10	31	
8	Firpo	33	12	5	16	43	51	−8	29	
9	Atletico Marte	33	10	7	16	39	41	−2	27	
10	ANTEL	33	9	7	17	37	49	−12	25	
11	Juventud Olimpico	33	7	4	22	33	55	−22	18	
12	Limeno	33	6	4	23	37	76	−39	16	Relegated to the Liga B

Updated to match(es) played on April 2023. Source:
Rules for classification: 1) points; 2) goal difference; 3) number of goals scored.

== Playoffs ==
=== Semifinals 1st leg ===
December 21, 1975

UES	3-1	Aguila
Mauricio Quintanilla 34' 69'; Julio Rolando Aguirre 89'		Luis Ramirez Zapata 84'

Estadio Cuscatlán

December 28, 1974

FAS	2-1	Alianza
David Cabrera 37'; Roberto Casadei 52'		Julio Cesar Cortez penalty 3'

Estadio Cuscatlán

=== Semifinals 2nd leg ===
January 4, 1974

Aguila	5-1	UES
Ismael “Cisco” Díaz 16' 63'; Joaquin Alonso Ventura 32'; Luis Ramírez Zapata 51'; Félix Pineda 54'		Herbert Hernández 60'

Estadio Cuscatlán

January 11, 1976

Alianza	2-1	FAS
Armando Cortez Sandoval 13' 28'		Guillermo Bou Rodriguez 65'

Estadio Cuscatlán
January 14, 1976

Alianza	1-0	FAS
Fernando Alva 62'		Nil

Estadio Nacional Flor Blanca

=== 3rd Place Match ===
January 25, 1976

FAS	4-1	UES
David Cabrera; Cesar Acevedo 3'; José Girón own goal 68'		Julio Sánchez 10'

Estadio Cuscatlán

=== Final ===
January 18, 1976

Alianza	1-1	Aguila
Moisés González 38'		Hugo Otenssen 63'

Estadio Cuscatlán

January 25, 1976

Aguila	3-1	Alianza
Moisés González 1'; Ismael “Cisco” Díaz 17'; Félix Pineda 65'		Victor Manuel Valencia 24'

Estadio Cuscatlán

Aguila
{{|1975-1976|7th|variant=|size=45x32px|name=}}

== Records ==
=== Team Records ===
- Best home records: TBD (00 points out of 33 points)
- Worst home records: TBD (0 points out of 33 points)
- Best away records : TBD (00 points out of 33 points)
- Worst away records : TBD (0 points out of 33 points)
- Most goals scored: Aguila (79 goals)
- Fewest goals scored: Juventud Olimpico (33 goals)
- Fewest goals conceded : Alianza (32 goals)
- Most goals conceded : Limeno (76 goals)

=== Top scorers ===
Pos	Player	Team	Goals
1.	(El Salvador) Luis Ramirez Zapata	Aguila	23
2.	(El Salvador) David Cabrera	FAS	21
3.	(El Salvador) Rafael Bucaro	Platense	17
4.	(El Salvador) Juan Ramon Martinez	Alianza	15
5.	(El Salvador) Oscar Guerrero Lotario	Platense	12
6.	(Argentina) Roberto Casadei	FAS	12
7.	(El Salvador) Moises Gonzalez	Aguila	11
8.	(Brazil) Helio Rodriguez	Aguila	10
9.	(El Salvador) Felix Pineda	Aguila	10
10.	(El Salvador) Roberto Salala	Alianza F.C.	10
11.	(El Salvador) Jose Luis Rugamas	Atletico Marte	10
12.	(El Salvador) Elmer Rosas	LA Firpo	10
13.	(El Salvador) Dimas Blanco	Municipal Limeno	10

=== Scoring ===
- First goal of the season: (El Salvador) Luis Ramírez Zapata for Aguila against Sonsonate, 2 minutes (April 6, 1975)
- First goal by a foreign player: (Argentina) Domingo Albil for FAS against Alianza, 16 minutes (April 6, 1975)
- Fastest goal in a match: 2 Minutes
  - (El Salvador) Luis Ramírez Zapata for Aguila against Sonsonate (April 6, 1975)
- Goal scored at the latest goal in a match: 101 minutes
  - (El Salvador) Moisés González goal for Aguila against Alianza, (September 21, 1975)
- First penalty Kick of the season: (El Salvador) Pepe Orellana for LA Firpo against Atletico Marte, th minutes (April 6, 1975)
- Widest winning margin: 6 goals
  - Aguila 7-1 Sonsonate (April 6, 1975)
- First hat-trick of the season: (El Salvador) Luis Ramírez Zapata for Aguila against UES (May 11, 1975)
- First own goal of the season: (El Salvador) Norberto Zafanella (Platense) for UES (April 9, 1975)
- Most goals in a match: 9 goals
  - FAS 5–4 Municipal Limeno (May 1, 1975)
- Most goals by one team in a match: 7 goals
  - Aguila 7-1 Sonsonate (April 6, 1975)
- Most goals in one half by one team: 4 goals
  - Aguila 4-0 (7–1) Sonsonate (1st half, April 6, 1975)
- Most goals scored by losing team: 4 goals
  - Municipal Limeno 4–5 FAS (May 1, 1975)
- Most goals by one player in a single match: 4 goals
  - (El Salvador) Luis Ramírez Zapata for Aguila against Tapachulteca FC (July 16, 1975)
  - (El Salvador) David Cabrera for FAS against Sonsonate (October 12, 1975)
- Players that scored a hat-trick':
  - (El Salvador) Luis Ramírez Zapata for Aguila against UES (May 11, 1975)
  - (El Salvador) Herbert Hernández for UES against Platense (June 30, 1975)
  - (El Salvador) Luis Ramírez Zapata for Aguila against Tapachulteca FC (July 16, 1975)
  - (Brazil) Enos Pereira for ANTEL against Municipal Limeno (August 24, 1975)
  - (El Salvador) David Cabrera for FAS against Sonsonate (October 12, 1975)

== List of foreign players in the league ==
This is a list of foreign players in 1975-76 Campeonato. The following players:

1. have played at least one apertura game for the respective club.
2. have not been capped for the El Salvador national football team on any level, independently from the birthplace

ANTEL

- (Argentina) Raúl Forteis
- (Brazil) Enos Pereira
- (Brazil) Arthur Rivas da Silva
- (Brazil) Nery de Souza

C.D. Águila

- (Argentina) Rodolfo Baello
- (Brazil) Ademir Barboza das Neves
- (Brazil) David Antonio Pinho
- (Brazil) Helio Rodríguez
- (Chile) Horacio Díaz Lucco

Alianza F.C.

- (Chile) Hugo Ottensen
- (Costa Rica) Juan Gutiérrez
- (Uruguay) Julio César Cortez
- (Peru) Fernando Alva

Atletico Marte

- (Brazil) Carlos Roberto Barboza
- (Chile) Juan Andrés Arrastoa
- (Chile) Mario Hernán Yubini Carreño
- (Chile) Belisario Díaz
- (Costa Rica) Luis Ernesto Nelson Ballesteros

C.D. FAS

- (Argentina) Domingo Albil
- (Argentina) Manolo Jovino Álvarez
- (Argentina) Roberto López
- (Argentina) Héctor Alcides Piccioni

LA Firpo

- (Brazil) Nelson de Moraes
- (Brazil) Pio da Silva
- (Chile) Jorge Amaya
- (Chile) Julio Gallegos
- (Guatemala) Bobby White

(player released mid season) (player Injured mid season) Injury replacement player

Municipal Limeno

- (Argentina) René Joaquín Cazalbón
- (Argentina) Juan Andrés Ríos
- (Uruguay) Rubén Iglesias
- (Uruguay) José Mattera Teglia

Negocios Internacionels\Juventud Olimpica

- (Argentina) Miguel Ángel “Rata” Cobián
- (Argentina) Hipólito Rojas
- (Brazil) Jorge Camilo Bonifacio
- (Brazil) Joao da Silva
- (Brazil) Walter Balbino da Silva
- (Brazil) Jurandyr dos Santos

Platense

- (Argentina) Luis César Condomí
- (Argentina) Ricardo Norberto Zafanella
- (Argentina) Rodolfo Gregorio Vicente
- (Uruguay) Albert Fay

Sonsonate

- (Argentina) Guillermo Fischer
- (Argentina) León Ugarte
- (Chile) Iván Crespo
- (Chile) Carlos Díaz
- (Chile) Luis Inestroza
- (Costa Rica) Carlos Alberto Ovares Cruz

Tapachulteca

- (Argentina) Raúl Héctor Cocherari
- (Chile) Enrique Iturra
- (Chile) Carlos Eduardo Jérez
- (Costa Rica) Jorge Omar Rosales Vargas
- (Costa Rica) William Salgado
- (Paraguay) Nelson Brizuela
- (Paraguay) Julio César Servín

UES

- (Argentina) Victor Donato
- (Argentina) Tony Rojas
- (Costa Rica) Victor “Palomino” Calvo
- (Costa Rica) Roy Saénz
