= Carlos Monteagudo =

Salvadoran footballer (born 1985)

Personal information
- Full name: Carlos Romeo Monteagudo Alfaro
- Date of birth: April 29, 1985 (age 41)
- Place of birth: San Vicente, El Salvador
- Height: 1.85 m (6 ft 1 in)
- Positions: Defender; midfielder

Senior career*
Years	Team	Apps	(Gls)
2004–2007	Independiente Nacional 1906		
2007–2013	CD Luis Ángel Firpo		
2015	→ CD Audaz (loan)		
2015–2016	Atlético Marte		
2016–2017	CD Dragón		
2018–2019	CD Audaz	45	(0)
2019–2020	Independiente FC		

International career
2006–	El Salvador	26	(1)
- * Club domestic league appearances and goals

Carlos Romeo Monteagudo Alfaro (born April 29, 1985) is a Salvadoran professional footballer.

== Club career ==
=== Independiente Nacional 1906 ===
Monteagudo started his professional career at hometown club Independiente Nacional 1906 in 2004. However, Independiente Nacional 1906 descended in the Clausura 2007 tournament to Segunda División.

In December 2008, Monteagudo and with his club and national teammate Manuel Salazar were invited for trials with Mexican Primera División A team Monterrey 1a. A (effectively CF Monterreys reserve team), with the hopes of signing with the club's Second Division side.

After the two-week trial, Monteagudo was close to signing with the Mexican side, but ultimately he was not offered a contract, and he returned to El Salvador.

=== Luis Ángel Firpo ===
In 2007, Monteagudo signed with Luis Ángel Firpo. With the team of Usulután Monteagudo won the Apertura 2007, Clausura 2008 and Clausura 2013. Also he lost the Clausura 2009 final against Isidro Metapán.

In the second leg of the semi-finals of the Clausura 2013, Monteagudo scored a crucial goal against Alianza in a 1–0 victory at the Sergio Torres Stadium. This goal allowed Luis Ángel Firpo to reach the final against FAS in the Estadio Cuscatlán.

=== Audaz ===
Monteagudo signed with Audaz in 2015.

=== Atlético Marte ===
Monteagudo signed with Atlético Marte in the Apertura 2015 tournament. In the Clausura 2016, Atlético Marte suffered a severe administrative, economic and sports crisis. Atlético Marte ended up descending with two games remaining for the end of the tournament.

=== Dragón ===
He signed with Dragón in the Apertura 2016 tournament.

=== Return to Audaz ===
Monteagudo signed again with Audaz for the Clausura 2018 tournament. Audaz was the newly promoted team in the previous tournament, the Apertura 2017. With Audaz, Monteagudo reached the quarter-finals of the Apertura 2018, but the team of San Vicente was eliminated by Águila 3–4 on aggregate.

=== Match-fixing ban ===
On September 20, 2013, Monteagudo was banned for 18 months due to his involvement with match-fixing.

== International career ==
Monteagudo officially received his first cap on November 15, 2006, when he came on as a substitute in a friendly match against Bolivia.

He scored his first goal for El Salvador on March 26, 2008, in a 2010 World Cup qualifying match against Anguilla. He has earned a total of 9 caps, scoring 1 goal and has represented his country in 2 FIFA World Cup qualification matches.

His most recent international game was an August 2009 friendly match against Colombia.

=== International goals ===
Scores and results list El Salvador's goal tally first.

#	Date	Venue	Opponent	Score	Result	Competition
1.	March 26, 2008	RFK Stadium, Washington, D.C., United States	Anguilla	3-0	4-0	2010 FIFA World Cup qualification
