= Victor Manuel Ochoa =

Salvadoran footballer and coach

Personal information
- Full name: Victor Manuel Ochoa Ventura
- Date of birth: 1917
- Place of birth: El Salvador
- Position: Midfielder

Senior career*
Years	Team	Apps	(Gls)
1947–1949	FAS		

International career
1940	El Salvador		

Managerial career
- 1951–1954: FAS
- 1963–1964: Águila
- 1964: El Salvador (assistant)
- 1966: Sonsonate
- 1969: FAS
- 1972: Alianza
- 1975: Negocios Internacionales
- 1978-1979: Alianza
- Honduras Progreso
- * Club domestic league appearances and goals

Victor Manuel Ochoa Ventura (born 1917 in El Salvador). is a Salvadoran football player and former coach.

== Club career ==
Nicknamed Pipe, Ochoa was the first goalscorer for FAS in the club's history in 1947.

== International career ==
Ochoa made his debut for the El Salvador national team in unofficial friendly against Costa Rican side Liga Deportiva Alajuelense in 1940 where he came on as sub, his team went on to lose 1–0.

== Managerial career ==
Ochoa also was the first technical director of FAS. As a coach "Pipe" Ochoa has obtained four championships at national level (2 National Championships with FAS, 2 National Championships with Águila), he was record holder before Conrado Miranda won his fifth league title in 1977. He also coached in Honduras first division with Honduras Progreso.

== Achievements ==
Year	Finish	Team	Tournament	Role	Notes
1951–52	Champion	Club Deportivo FAS	1st Division El Salvador	Coach	FAS first title in their history
1953–54	Champion	Club Deportivo FAS	1st Division El Salvador	Coach	First Coach of FAS to win back to back titles
1963–1964	Champion	Club Deportivo Aguila	1st Division El Salvador	Coach	
1964	Champion	Club Deportivo Aguila	1st Division El Salvador	Coach	First coach of Aguila to win back to back Titles
