= Marlon Trejo =

Salvadoran footballer (born 1988)

Personal information
- Full name: Marlon Hermenson Trejo García
- Date of birth: December 31, 1988 (age 37)
- Place of birth: Usulután, El Salvador
- Height: 1.73 m (5 ft 8 in)
- Position: Midfielder

Youth career
- 2007–2009: Luis Ángel Firpo (B)

Senior career*
| Years | Team | Apps | (Gls) |
| 2009–2014 | Luis Angel Firpo | | |
| 2014–2023 | Águila | | |
| | Santa Tecla | 20 | |
- Luis Angel Firpo
- Zacatecoluca

International career
| 2014 | El Salvador | 1 | (0) |
- * Club domestic league appearances and goals

Marlon Hermenson Trejo García (born December 31, 1988) is a Salvadoran former professional footballer who played as a midfielder.

== Honours ==
Luis Ángel Firpo

- Salvadoran Primera División: Clausura 2013

Águila

- Salvadoran Primera División: Clausura 2019; runner-up Clausura 2016
