= Primera División Under-17 (El Salvador) =

- Country: El Salvador
- Confederation: CONCACAF
- Number of clubs: 12
- Level on pyramid: 1
- Current champions: Platense under-17 (1st title) (2025 Clausura)
- Most championships: Alianza under 17 (8th titles)
- Current: 2025 Apertura

The Under 17 Primera División (Spanish: Primera División categoría Sub-17) (officially known as Burger King Sub 17), is the highest level of play in El Salvador football for male juniors between the ages of 15 and 17.

== Format ==
The Under 17 Primera División begins the first weekend in September and ends in April or May. The Under 17 Primera División's season is similar to the senior players' Primera División playing a double round-robin points based system. The top 8 teams progress to a knock-out tournament. the final team compete in a single game final. the winner is declared champion. Relegation is solely based on whether the senior team is relegated.

== Champions ==
=== Superliga Juvenil ===
| Season | Champion | Score | Runner-up | Champion coach | Top goalscorer | Notes |
|---|---|---|---|---|---|---|
| Clausura 2014 | Dragon | 2-2 (5-4 (pen.)) | Alianza under 17 | (El Salvador) Manuel Acevedo | (El Salvador) TBD | |
| Apertura 2014 | Alianza under 17 | 4–1 | Isidro Metapán sub 17 | (El Salvador) Victor Manuel Pacheco | (El Salvador) TBD | |
| Clausura 2015 | Alianza under 17 | 1-0 | Juventud Independiente under 17 | (El Salvador) Victor Manuel Pacheco | (El Salvador) TBD | |
| Apertura 2015 | Isidro Metapán sub 17 | 3-3 (6-5 (pen.)) | Aguila under 17 | (El Salvador) TBD | (El Salvador) TBD | |
| Clausura 2016 | El Salvador under 17 | 2–2 (4–3 (pen.)) | Aguila under 17 | (El Salvador) Erick Prado | (El Salvador) TBD | |
| Apertura 2016 | FAS under 17 | 6–2 | UES | (El Salvador) Miguel Leiva | (El Salvador) TBD | |
| Clausura 2017 | Aguila under 17 | 4–0 | FAS under 17 | (El Salvador) Salamon Quintanilla | (El Salvador) TBD | |
| Apertura 2017 | Alianza under 17 | 1–0 | Aguila under 17 | (El Salvador) Juan Carlos Serrano | (El Salvador) Bayron Lopes & Luis Pineda | |
| Clausura 2018 | Aguila under 17 | 2–1 | Alianza under 17 | (El Salvador) Salamon Quintanilla | (El Salvador) TBD | |
| Apertura 2018 | FAS under 17 | 3–1 | Municipal Limeno under 17 | (El Salvador) Miguel Leiva | (El Salvador) TBD | |
| Clausura 2019 | Alianza under 17 | 2–2 (4–2 (pen.)) | Aguila under 17 | (El Salvador) Juan Carlos Serrano | (El Salvador) Juan Sanchez | |
| Apertura 2019 | Alianza under 17 | 2–1 | Santa Tecla under 17 | (El Salvador) Juan Carlos Serrano | (El Salvador) Brandon Rodríguez | |
| Clausura 2020-Clausura 2023 | HIATUS | | HIATUS | (El Salvador) NONE | (El Salvador) NONE | |
| Apertura 2023 | Isidro Metapán sub 17 | 2–2 (4–3 (pen.)) | Santa Tecla under 17 | (El Salvador) Pedro Esquivel | (El Salvador) Zuriel Meléndez & Cristofer Benítez | |
| Clausura 2024 | Alianza under 17 | 2–1 | FAS under 17 | (El Salvador) Nelson Rojas | (El Salvador) Kevin Garcia | |
| Apertura 2024 | FAS under 17 | 1–1 (4–2 (pen.)) | Alianza under 17 | (El Salvador) Nelson Ancheta | (El Salvador) TBD | |
| Clausura 2025 | Platense under-17 | 0–0 (4–2 (pen.)) | Alianza under 17 | (El Salvador) Cristian Ernesto Lopez | (El Salvador) TBD | |
| Apertura 2025 | Alianza under 17 | 2-0 | Inter FA under 17 | (El Salvador) Nelson Rojas | (El Salvador) Oscar Julian Cuellar | |
| Clausura 2026 | Aguila under 17 | 2-1 | Hércules under 17 | (El Salvador) Manuel Ramos Ponce | (El Salvador) Oscar Regalado (El Salvador) Diego Gonzalez | |
| Apertura 2026 | TBD | | TBD | (El Salvador) TBD | (El Salvador) TBD | |

=== Performance by Under 17 club ===
Those in BOLD is the current champion

| Club | Winners | Runners-up | Winning seasons |
|---|---|---|---|
| Alianza sub 17 | 7 | 4 | Apertura 2014, Clausura 2015, Apertura 2017, Clausura 2019, Apertura 2019, Clausura 2024, Apertura 2025 |
| FAS sub 17 | 3 | 2 | Apertura 2016, Apertura 2018, Apertura 2024 |
| **Águila sub 17** | 3 | 4 | Clausura 2017, Clausura 2018, Clausura 2026 |
| Isidro Metapan under 17 | 2 | 1 | Apertura 2015, Apertura 2023 |
| Dragon under 17 | 1 | 0 | Clausura 2014 |
| El Salvador under 17 | 1 | 0 | Clausura 2016 |
| Platense under-17 | 1 | 0 | Clausura 2025 |
