= Maquinita Merlos =

Salvadoran footballer (1941–2014)

Personal information
- Full name: Juan Antonio Merlos Cabrera
- Date of birth: 1941
- Place of birth: San Miguel, El Salvador
- Date of death: December 6, 2014 (aged 73)
- Place of death: El Salvador
- Position: Striker

Senior career*
Years	Team	Apps	(Gls)
- Racing de San Miguel
1957–1970	Águila		
1972–1973	Municipal Limeño		
1974	Luis Ángel Firpo		

International career
- El Salvador

Managerial career
- Santiagueño
- Luis Ángel Firpo
- Liberal
- Municipal Limeño
- * Club domestic league appearances and goals

Juan Antonio "Maquinita" Merlos Cabrera (December 3, 1941 – December 6, 2014) was a Salvadoran football player and manager.

== Club career ==
Nicknamed Maquinita, Merlos was snapped up by Águila at Racing San Miguel and took part in their promotion to the Primera División de Fútbol de El Salvador in 1958. He also won his and the club's first league title in 1959, scoring one of the goals in the first leg of the Final. He still is one of Águila's all-time top goalscorers after forming a formidable frontline partnership in the 1960s with players like Juan Francisco Barraza and Saúl Molina.

He also played for Municipal Limeño and Luis Ángel Firpo after leaving Águila.

== Managerial career ==
After his playing career ended, Merlos coached Santiagueño and helped the team win the Primera division title. He also coached Luis Angel Firpo, Liberal and Municipal Limeno.

== Personal life ==
He lived with his wife in Santiago de María. In July 2010 he spent three months in hospital and had his right foot and later his leg below the knee amputated due to arteriosclerosis. To cover the medical expenses, former teammates and colleagues organised a charity match between his old clubs Águila and Santiagueño. In January 2011 he was given a pension for life by the National Assembly for his contribution to Salvadoran football.

== Honours ==
- Primera División de Fútbol de El Salvador: 5

1959, 1960, 1961, 1963, 1964
