= 1983 Primera División de Fútbol Profesional =

Primera División de Fútbol Profesional
- Season: 1983
- Champions: Aguila (9th Title)
- Relegated: ADET

The 1983 Primera División de Fútbol Profesional season. At the end of the regular season, the top 6 teams took part in Qualifying round, this was followed by a final group stage. Aguila were named Champions after topping the final group stage

== Teams ==
| Team | City | Stadium | Head coach | Captain |
|---|---|---|---|---|
| Atletico Marte | TBD | Estadio Cuscatlan | (El Salvador) | (El Salvador) |
| ADET | TBD | Estadio Hanz Usko | (El Salvador) TBD | (El Salvador) |
| Aguila | TBD | Estadio Juan Francisco Barraza | (El Salvador) Juan Francisco Barraza | (El Salvador) |
| Alianza | TBD | Estadio Cuscatlan | (El Salvador) TBD | (El Salvador) |
| Chalatenango | TBD | Estadio El Sombrero | (El Salvador) TBD | (El Salvador) |
| FAS | TBD | Estadio Oscar Quiteño | (Argentina) Juan Quarterone | (El Salvador) Fredy Rivera |
| Firpo | TBD | Estadio de Usulutan | (El Salvador) TBD | (El Salvador) |
| Independiente | TBD | Estadio Jiboa | (El Salvador) TBD | (El Salvador) Gustavo Guerrero |
| Once Lobos | TBD | Estadio El Progreso | (El Salvador) Ricardo Mena Laguán | (El Salvador) Juan Soto Y Rodriguez Nochez |
| UES | TBD | Estadio Universitario | (El Salvador) TBD | (El Salvador) |

== Notable events ==
=== Luis Angel Firpo purchase of Agave spot in the Primera Division ===
On the Firpo acquired the spot of Agave F.C. in the Primera division. This ended the club solo appearance in the Primera division.

== Managerial changes ==
=== During the season ===
| Team | Outgoing manager | Manner of departure | Date of vacancy | Replaced by | Date of appointment | Position in table |
|---|---|---|---|---|---|---|
| TBD | (El Salvador) TBD | Sacked | 1989 | (El Salvador) | 1990 | |
| TBD | (El Salvador) TBD | Sacked | 1989 | (El Salvador) | 1990 | |

== League standings ==
| Pos | Team | Pld | W | D | L | GF | GA | GD | Pts | Qualification or relegation |
|---|---|---|---|---|---|---|---|---|---|---|
| 1 | C.D. FAS | 18 | 11 | 5 | 2 | 33 | 11 | +22 | 27 | Qualified to finals. Won the right to play a Championship Game if they fail to win the final round. |
| 2 | Independiente | 18 | 8 | 6 | 4 | 23 | 14 | +9 | 22 | Qualified to finals. |
| 3 | Atlético Marte | 18 | 8 | 7 | 3 | 26 | 12 | +14 | 23 | Qualified to finals. |
| 4 | C.D. Luis Ángel Firpo | 18 | 6 | 8 | 4 | 18 | 16 | +2 | 20 | Qualified to finals. |
| 5 | C.D. Águila | 18 | 6 | 7 | 5 | 22 | 19 | +3 | 19 | Qualified to finals. |
| 6 | Once Lobos | 18 | 7 | 5 | 6 | 18 | 16 | +2 | 19 | Qualified to finals. |
| 7 | Alianza F.C. | 18 | 4 | 7 | 7 | 21 | 28 | −7 | 15 | |
| 8 | UES | 18 | 5 | 5 | 8 | 21 | 32 | −11 | 15 | |
| 9 | ADET | 18 | 3 | 5 | 10 | 14 | 27 | −13 | 11 | Relegated to Segunda Division. (lost a playoff) |
| 10 | C.D. Chalatenango | 18 | 2 | 5 | 11 | 19 | 39 | −20 | 9 | |

Source: https://www.rsssf.org/tablese/elsalhist.html

== Second round standings ==
| Pos | Team | Pld | W | D | L | GF | GA | GD | Pts | Qualification |
|---|---|---|---|---|---|---|---|---|---|---|
| 1 | C.D. Águila | 10 | 4 | 4 | 2 | 15 | 12 | +3 | 12 | Qualified to finals. |
| 2 | Independiente | 10 | 3 | 5 | 2 | 13 | 9 | +4 | 11 | Qualified to finals. |
| 3 | Once Lobos | 10 | 3 | 5 | 2 | 10 | 7 | +3 | 11 | Qualified to finals. |
| 4 | Atlético Marte | 10 | 1 | 7 | 2 | 10 | 12 | −2 | 9 | |
| 5 | C.D. FAS | 10 | 4 | 2 | 4 | 12 | 14 | −2 | 10 | Qualified to finals. |
| 6 | C.D. Luis Ángel Firpo | 10 | 2 | 3 | 5 | 11 | 20 | −9 | 7 | |

Source: https://www.rsssf.org/tablese/elsalhist.html

== Final round standings ==
| Pos | Team | Pld | W | D | L | GF | GA | GD | Pts | Qualification |
|---|---|---|---|---|---|---|---|---|---|---|
| 1 | C.D. Águila | 6 | 3 | 2 | 1 | 9 | 6 | +3 | 8 | Champions |
| 2 | C.D. FAS | 6 | 3 | 1 | 2 | 5 | 4 | +1 | 7 | |
| 3 | Once Lobos | 6 | 2 | 1 | 3 | 8 | 9 | −1 | 5 | |
| 4 | Independiente | 6 | 1 | 2 | 3 | 6 | 9 | −3 | 4 | |

Source: https://www.rsssf.org/tablese/elsalhist.html

== Top scorers ==
| Pos | Player | Team | Goals |
|---|---|---|---|
| 1. | (El Salvador) David Arnoldo Cabrera | FAS | 16 |
| 2 | (El Salvador) TBD | TBD | TBD |
| 3. | (El Salvador) TBD | TBD | TBD |
| 4. | (El Salvador) TBD | TBD | TBD |
| 5. | (El Salvador) TBD | TBD | TBD |
| 6. | (El Salvador) TBD | TBD | TBD |
| 7. | (El Salvador) TBD | TBD | TBD |
| 8. | (El Salvador) TBD | TBD | TBD |
| 9. | (El Salvador) TBD | TBD | TBD |
| 10. | (El Salvador) TBD | TBD | TBD |

== List of foreign players in the league ==
This is a list of foreign players in 1983 Seasons. The following players:

1. have played at least one apertura game for the respective club.
2. have not been capped for the El Salvador national football team on any level, independently from the birthplace

ADET

- (Brazil)

Águila

- (Argentina) Ramon ALberto Ramirez
- (Argentina) Alejandro Glomba
- (Guatemala) Rogelio Flores

Alianza F.C.

- (Argentina)

Atletico Marte

- None

Chalatenango

- (Honduras)

(player released mid season) (player Injured mid season) Injury replacement player

FAS

- (Argentina) Manolo Alvarez
- (Guatemala) Benjamin Monterrosso

Independiente

- (Honduras) Ramon Maradiaga

Luis Ángel Firpo

- (Brazil) Carlos Lopez Neves
- (Brazil) Ernesto Paez de Oliveira Bimba Barrabas

Once Lobos

- (Guatemala) Byron Pérez
- (Guatemala) Óscar La “Coneja” Sánchez
- (Guatemala) Erwin Donis
- (Guatemala) Jorge La “Chana” Fernández

UES

- (Honduras) Harry Ramon Bran
