= Zózimo =

Brazilian footballer

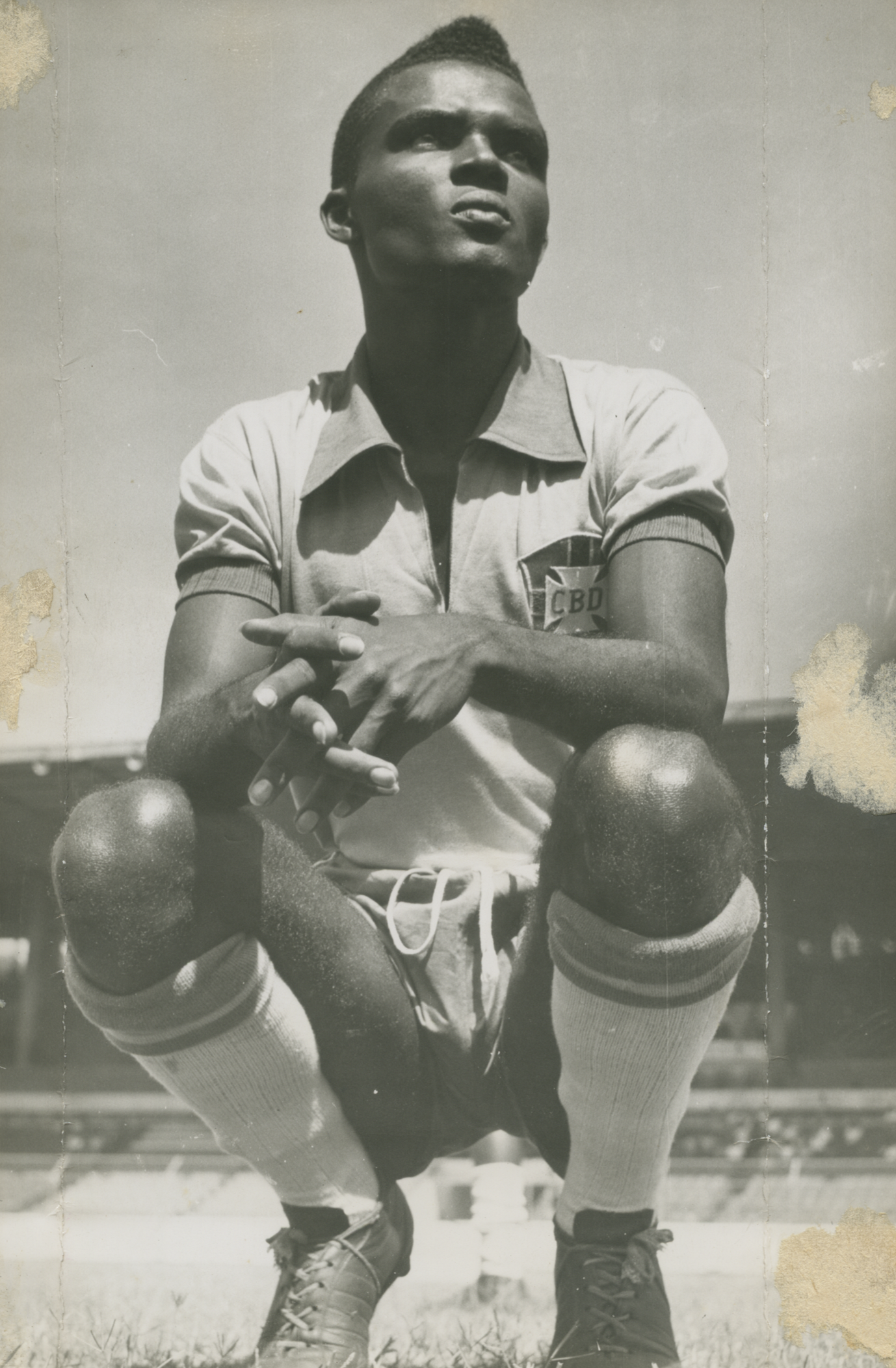
- Zózimo with Brazil in 1956

Personal information
- Full name: Zózimo Alves Calazans
- Date of birth: 19 June 1932
- Place of birth: Salvador, Brazil
- Date of death: 21 July 1977 (aged 45)
- Place of death: Rio de Janeiro, Brazil
- Height: 1.76 m (5 ft 9 1/2 in)
- Positions: Centre-back; midfielder

Youth career
- 1950: São Cristóvão

Senior career*
Years	Team	Apps	(Gls)
1951–1965	Bangu	245	(17)
1965	Flamengo		
1965	Portuguesa		
1966	Sport Boys		
1967	Porvenir Miraflores		
1967–1968	Águila		

International career
1955–1962	Brazil	35	(1)

Managerial career
- 1968: Águila
- 1973: Deportivo Municipal
- 1975–1976: Sport Boys
- 1976: Bangu
Medal record
Men's Football
Representing Brazil
FIFA World Cup
Winner	1958 Sweden
Winner	1962 Chile
South American Championship
Runner-up	1957 Peru
- * Club domestic league appearances and goals

Zózimo Alves Calazans (19 June 1932 – 21 July 1977), best known as Zózimo, was a Brazilian footballer who played as a centre-back and midfielder lasted from 1948 to 1967.

Born in Plataforma, a bairro of Salvador, the capital of Bahia, Zózimo played for Brazil's São Cristóvão, Bangu, Flamengo, Portuguesa and Esportiva de Guarantinguetá, as well as Peru's Sport Boys in Callao and El Salvador's Club Deportivo Águila in San Miguel. He won one Rio de Janeiro State Championship in 1965 and was a two-time winner for the Brazilian team at the FIFA World Cup in 1958 and 1962. He was also part of Brazil's squad for the 1952 Summer Olympics. In his 19-year career he earned a reputation as one of Brazil's most highly skilled players.

Four weeks after his 45th birthday, Zózimo died in a road accident in Rio de Janeiro.
