= Jonathan Águila =

Salvadoran footballer (born 1990)

Personal information
- Full name: Jonathan Josué Águila Joya
- Date of birth: 11 November 1990 (age 35)
- Place of birth: San Miguel, El Salvador
- Height: 1.72 m (5 ft 8 in)
- Position: Forward

Youth career
- 2005–2008: Águila

Senior career*
Years	Team	Apps	(Gls)
2007	CD Águila San Isidro		
2007	ADI FC		
2008–2013	CD Águila		
2012–2013	→ CD FAS (loan)		
2013–2016	CD FAS		
2017	Santa Tecla FC		
2017–2018	CD Chalatenango		

International career
2006	El Salvador U17		
2008	El Salvador U20		
2012–2014	El Salvador	7	(0)
- * Club domestic league appearances and goals

Jonathan Josué Águila Joya (born 11 November 1990) is a Salvadoran former professional footballer who played as a forward.

== Club career ==
Born in San Miguel, Águila started in the FundaMadrid project and then joined Águila San Isidro and later, ADI.

His professional career started in February 2008, when he signed a contract with Salvadoran national league club, Águila.

He made his professional debut on 5 April 2008, in a league match against San Salvador. He scored his first goal on 31 January 2009 in a league match against Luis Ángel Firpo.

== Career statistics ==
=== Club ===
Club	Season	League		League Cup		Continental		Other		Total	
Club	Season	Apps	Goals	Apps	Goals	Apps	Goals	Apps	Goals	Apps	Goals
Águila	Clausura 2008	3	0	–		0	0	0	0	3	0
Águila	Apertura 2008	1	0	–		0	0	0	0	1	0
Águila	Clausura 2009	3	1	–		0	0	0	0	3	1
Career total		7	1	–		0	0	0	0	7	1
