= 1987–88 Primera División de El Salvador =

Primera División de El Salvador
- Season: 1987–88
- Champions: Aguila (10th Titles)
- Relegated: Once Lobos

The 1987–88 Primera División de El Salvador was the 37th tournament of El Salvador's Primera División since its establishment of the National League system in 1948. The tournament was scheduled to end in December 1988. Aguila were crowned champions without the need of playing a final, as they were the best team in the regular and championship round.

== Teams ==
Team	City	Stadium	Head coach	Captain
Acajutla	TBD	Estadio	(El Salvador) TBD	(El Salvador)
Atletico Marte	TBD	Estadio Cuscutlan	(El Salvador)	(El Salvador)
Aguila	TBD	Estadio	(El Salvador) TBD	(El Salvador)
Alianza	TBD	Estadio	(El Salvador) TBD	(El Salvador)
Chalatenango	TBD	Estadio	(El Salvador) TBD	(El Salvador)
Cojutepeque	TBD	Estadio	(El Salvador) TBD	(El Salvador)
FAS	TBD	Estadio	(Uruguay) Orlando De León	(El Salvador)
Firpo	TBD	Estadio	(El Salvador) TBD	(El Salvador)
Metapan	TBD	Estadio	(El Salvador) TBD	(El Salvador)
Once Lobos	TBD	Estadio	(El Salvador) TBD	(El Salvador)

== Managerial changes ==
=== During the season ===
Team	Outgoing manager	Manner of departure	Date of vacancy	Replaced by	Date of appointment	Position in table
TBD	(El Salvador) TBD	Sacked	1989	(El Salvador)	1990	
TBD	(El Salvador) TBD	Sacked	1989	(El Salvador)	1990	

== League standings ==
Pos	Team	Pld	W	D	L	GF	GA	GD	Pts	Qualification or relegation
1	C.D. Águila	27	14	10	3	39	17	+22	38	Qualified to finals. Won the right to play a Championship Game if they fail to win the final round.
2	Acajutla	29	9	15	5	17	17	0	33	Qualified to finals.
3	C.D. Luis Ángel Firpo	27	9	11	7	39	34	+5	29	Qualified to finals.
4	C.D. FAS	27	9	10	8	29	34	−5	28	Qualified to finals.
5	C.D. Chalatenango	27	6	14	7	27	25	+2	26	
6	Metapán	27	6	14	7	36	39	−3	26	
7	Cojutepeque	27	8	10	9	31	36	−5	26	
8	Alianza F.C.	27	8	8	11	37	37	0	24	
9	Atlético Marte	27	5	13	9	28	29	−1	23	
10	Once Lobos	27	5	11	11	30	45	−15	21	Relegated to Segunda Division.

Source: https://www.rsssf.org/tablese/elsalhist.html

== Final round standings ==
Pos	Team	Pld	W	D	L	GF	GA	GD	Pts	Qualification
1	C.D. Águila	6	3	2	1	4	2	+2	8	Champions
2	C.D. FAS	6	1	4	1	6	6	0	6	
3	C.D. Luis Ángel Firpo	6	2	1	3	5	6	−1	5	
4	Acajutla	6	1	3	2	4	5	−1	5	

Source: https://www.rsssf.org/tablese/elsalhist.html

== Top scorers ==
Pos	Player	Team	Goals
1.	(Uruguay) Ruben Alonso	Alianza F.C.	15
2	(Uruguay) Clemente Gussoni	Metapan F.C.	12
3.	(Uruguay) Julio César Tejeda	FAS	12
4.	(El Salvador) Amilcar Palacios Lozano	Alianza F.C.	11
5.	(El Salvador) TBD	TBD	TBD
6.	(El Salvador) TBD	TBD	TBD
7.	(El Salvador) TBD	TBD	TBD
8.	(El Salvador) TBD	TBD	TBD
9.	(El Salvador) TBD	TBD	TBD
10.	(El Salvador) TBD	TBD	TBD

== List of foreign players in the league ==
This is a list of foreign players in 1987-1988. The following players:

1. have played at least one apertura game for the respective club.
2. have not been capped for the El Salvador national football team on any level, independently from the birthplace

Acajutla

- (Brazil) Eraldo Correia
- (Paraguay) (Uruguay) Asdrúbal Padin
- (Uruguay) Raul Esnal

C.D. Águila

- (Argentina) Néstor Doroni
- (Brazil) João Cabral
- (Chile) Juan Carlos Carreño
- (Uruguay) Luis Güelmo

Alianza F.C.

- (Argentina) Óscar Biegler
- (Uruguay) Ruben Alonso
- (Uruguay) Carlos Reyes
- (Uruguay) Hernán Sosa

Atletico Marte

- (Honduras)

Chalatenango

- (Argentina) Arnaldo Martínez
- (Brazil) Marco Pereira

(player released mid season) (player Injured mid season) Injury replacement player

Cojutepeque

- (Honduras)

C.D. FAS

- (Argentina) Manolo Álvarez
- (Guatemala) Rogelio Flores
- (Guatemala) Roberto Montepeque
- (Uruguay) Héctor Cedrés
- (Uruguay) Julio César Tejeda

C.D. Luis Ángel Firpo

- (Argentina) Rubén Darío Plaino

Metapan

- (Honduras) Arnold Lopez
- (Uruguay) Daniel Uberti
- (Uruguay) Miguel del Rio
- Clemente Uruguay Gussoni

Once lobos

- (Honduras)
