= Conrado Miranda =

Salvadoran footballer (1928–2021)

Personal information
- Full name: José Conrado Miranda Sasso
- Date of birth: 14 October 1928
- Place of birth: San Vicente, El Salvador
- Date of death: 13 October 2021 (aged 92)
- Place of death: San Salvador, El Salvador
- Position: Midfielder

Senior career*
Years	Team	Apps	(Gls)
–1943	Pipiles F.C.		
1944–1945	Independiente de San Vicente		
–1954	Marte Quezaltepeque		
1954	Club Sport Uruguay		
1955–57	Marte Quezaltepeque		
1958	Club Sport La Libertad		
1959–60	Águila		

International career
1948–1955	El Salvador	20	(3)

Managerial career
- 1955–1957: Marte Quezaltepeque
- 1959–1961: Águila
- 1961: El Salvador
- 1962: UES
- 1965: Quequeisque
- 1967: Alianza
- 1971: El Salvador
- 1975: El Salvador
- 1975–1978: Águila
- 1962: Atlante
- 1985-1986: Isidro Metapan
- 1986–1987: Once Municipal
- 1989: El Salvador
- 1989: Cojutepeque
- 1993–1995: El Roble
- Tiburones
- 1973: ANTEL
Medal record
Representing El Salvador
Men's Football
Central American and Caribbean Games
Gold medal – first place	1954 El Salvador	Team competition
- * Club domestic league appearances and goals

José Conrado Miranda Sasso (14 October 1928 – 13 October 2021) was a Salvadoran football player and coach who created a legacy in El Salvador.

He and longtime partner Juan Francisco Barraza helped evolve football in El Salvador. He was known as El Estilista.

== Club career ==
His first steps as a player are traced to the Pipiles F.C. His debut at the national level was playing for Independiente de San Vicente. Later he moved to CD Alacranes which was renamed C.D. Atlético Marte at his suggestion. In 1954 Conrado Miranda was contracted as a player by Uruguay de Coronado (Costa Rica) for a 1-year contract. Afterwards he returned to Atlético Marte for a three-year stint but this time as player/coach that produced three national championships (1955, 1956, 1957).

He was again contracted by a Costa Rica team, Club Sport La Libertad. After this final stint on international soil Conrado Miranda returned to El Salvador where he was contracted by C.D. Águila of San Miguel as both player and coach. The team earned a championship in 1959. In 1960, after breaking his leg, he retired as a player. He took the opportunity to coach the El Salvador national football team and left his C.D. Águila team in 1st place. They won the championship with Carlos Padilla as the coach (1960).

== International career ==
Conrado Miranda represented El Salvador as a captain most of the time from 1948 to 1955, during this period El Salvador won the gold medal at the VII Central American and Caribbean Games in 1954 in Mexico.

== Managerial career ==
As a coach Conrado Miranda has obtained multiple championships at national and international level (3 national championships with Atlético Marte, 3 national championships with CD Aguila, 1 CONCACAF Champions Cup). He has also coached El Salvador national team both at major and junior levels with success especially in 1964 when he took the youth National team to 1st place in the NORCECA, a competition played in Guatemala.

Conrado Miranda was also the founder of AEFES (Asociación de Entrenadores de Fútbol de El Salvador) for which he was the first president in 1965 and CONADEPRE (Comisión Nacional de Deportes Recreativos de El Salvador). Under this institution he created what is known now as Papi fútbol (fútbol for players over 35) and Babi fútbol (fútbol for players under 15) as a vehicle to promote the game.

Conrado Miranda has received multiple honours in recognition of his career. He was named to the El Salvador Team of the 20th century and received "La Espiga Dorada" from the hands of the President of El Salvador at the time, Francisco Flores, in recognition of his achievements as a player and coach and for his contribution to all sporting activities at the national level.

== Death ==
On 13 October 2021, it was announced that Miranda had died due to a complication of a cardio pulmonary from COVID-19. He was 92 years old.

== Achievements ==
Year	Finish	Team	Tournament	Role	Notes
1954	Champion	El Salvador	VII Juegos Centro Americanos y del Caribe	Player	played in México
1955	Champion	Atlético Marte	1st Division El Salvador	Player/Coach	
1956	Champion	Atlético Marte	1st Division El Salvador	Player/Coach	
1957	Champion	Atlético Marte	1st Division El Salvador	Player/Coach	
1959	Champion	C.D. Aguila	1st Division El Salvador	Player/Coach	
1960	Champion	C.D. Aguila	1st Division El Salvador	Player/Coach*	*Started season before taking National Team
1961	2nd Place	Salvador Nacional Team	NORCECA	Coach	played in Costa Rica
1962	Champion	UES	Liga de Ascenso	Coach	
1967	2nd Place	Alianza F.C.	1st Division El Salvador	Coach	
1964	Champion	El Salvador Under 20	NORCECA Under 19	Coach	played in Guatemala
1965	TBD	Quequeisque	? Division El Salvador	Coach	
1975	Champion	C.D. Águila	1st Division El Salvador	Coach	
1976	Champion	C.D. Aguila	1st Division El Salvador	Coach	
1976	Champion	C.D. Aguila	CONCACAF Champions Cup	Coach	
1978	2nd Place	C.D. Aguila	1st Division El Salvador	Coach	
1989	2nd Place	Cojutepeque F.C.	1st Division El Salvador	Coach	
1993	3rd Place	El Roble	1st Division El Salvador	Coach	
1994	3rd Place	El Roble	1st Division El Salvador	Coach	
