= C.D. Águila =

Association football club in El Salvador

Águila
- Full name: Club Deportivo Águila
- Nicknames: Aguiluchos; Emplumados; La 50+1; Negronaranjas
- Founded: 15 February 1926; 100 years ago
- Ground: Estadio Juan Francisco Barraza
- Capacity: 14,000
- President: (El Salvador) Rigoberto Ortiz Ostorga
- Manager: (Argentina) Santiago Davio
- League: (El Salvador) Primera División
- 2026 Clausura: Overall: 1st Playoffs: Quarterfinal
Home colours	Away colours

Club Deportivo Águila, commonly known as Águila, is a Salvadoran professional football club based in San Miguel. The club currently competes in Primera División, the top tier of El Salvador football league system.

Águila is one of the most successful clubs in El Salvador football history, with seventeen Primera División championships, one Copa Presidente, and one CONCACAF Champions' Cup. Their 1976 CONCACAF Champions' Cup 1976 title made them the second Salvadoran team to win a CONCACAF title.

Since 1956, Águila have played their home games at Estadio Juan Francisco Barraza located in San Miguel.

Aguila is one of the most widely supported football clubs in El Salvador, and has a long standing rivalry with neighbours Dragón, known as the San Miguel derby, and also competes with power club FAS, known as El Clásico (English: The Classic).

== History ==
=== Foundation and early years ===
Club Deportivo Águila was founded on 15 February 1926, in the City of San Miguel, by a group of young people. The first club president was Victor Vanegas. The major goal of the club was first to establish a baseball team, and later develop football and basketball teams. At the beginning, baseball and football were not as successful as basketball with the team dominating in both El Salvador as in neighbouring countries.

In 1956, a group met in San Miguel and decided to form a football team named Club Deportivo Águila. Their first act was to meet with the president of Alacranes, Miguel Sagastizado, after sometime negotiating, they purchased their spot in Liga B and this was ratified by FESFUT on 21 August 1956. In the first season the club played under the name of CD A, this was due to another club in the division Águilas FC from Santa Tecla having a similar name. To attract big names players the clubs paid a minimum of 75 colones per month (US$8), which was above the average of their three biggest rivals (Dragon Rácing and Corona) paid their players per month, which was around 30 to 50 colones (US$3.40 – 5.70). This allowed them to signed players such as Juan Francisco Barraza, Esteban Blanco, Salvador Hernández, Fito Fuentes, Juan Merthem, Atilio Pineda, Honduran Manuel Larios, Saul Molina and Rodolfo Fuentes. This came at great cost professionally as FESFUT barred the players to play for the national team as no second division players were allowed to represent the national team. They hired Argentinian Agustin Noriega who previously coached Guatemalan club like Guatemala Deportiva. CD A first game was a 2–2 all draw with Titan, with Juan Antonio "Maquinita" Merlos scoring both goals, by the end of the season Juan Merlos was the team leading scorer with 16 goals.

During its time in the lower leagues, it fought for the affections of the San Miguel people alongside rival Dragón, but when they were promoted to the Liga, it attracted a following not only from San Miguel but also from the entire country. Proof of this was demonstrated by the fact that the teams sold more tickets when the local club played against Águila.

=== Early titles (1956-1961) ===
After two years in the Liga B (Segunda Division), Aguila qualified to Championship/Promotional series against Atlético Constancia (Currently known as Alianza F.C. Aguila won the first game 2–0, thanks to a double from Juan Antonio Merlos, and after 0–0 draw in the second leg. Aguila were promoted to the first division for the first time in the club history.

In their very first campaign, Under the tutelage of Conrado Miranda, and signing of key players such as Juan Francisco Barraza, Juan Antonio Merlos and Saul Molina, Costa Rican Fernando Jiménez and many others, Aguila finished the regular season tied on points with future arch rival FAS (26 points), the club scored on average 2.6 goals per game and included a memorable 7–0 victory over Leones de Sonsonate. This required a two=legged playoff games, which Aguila won the first leg 4–0. the goalscorers were Costa Rican Raul Lizano, Juan Francisco Barraza, Salvador Rocabruna and Juan Antonio Merlos. The club were able to win 1–0 away, with the sole goal coming from Saul Molina. They became the first club to win a title after gaining promotion, only two other clubs have done that in the history of Primera Division (C.D. Platense Municipal Zacatecoluca and C.D. Vista Hermosa).

The following season, the club hired Honduran coach Carlos Padilla, signed Raul Corcio and Costa Rican Ramon Rodriguez, and promoted Sergio Mendez from the youth level. The club went on to win 14 games, draw 3 games and only suffered 1 game. The club secured the title after defeating Atlante 3–1 on the 14th of May, 1961. The club were able twin back to back titles for the first time in the club history.

=== Third and Fourth titles under Victor Manuel Ochoa(1963-1965) ===
After an unsuccessful 1962 campaigns. The club board members hired Victor Manuel Ochoa for the 1963-64 campaign, the club started poorly with loss against 2-0 UES (goals from Alcides Cabrera and Mauricio Rodriguez), 2–1 loss against Arch-rivals FAS (goals from Macklin Flores and Arutro Jaco; with Juan Merlos for Aguila) and 4–4 draw against Once Municipal. Despite call for Victor Manuel Ochoa to be sacked, the club preserved with him, the result turned around with Aguila winning 5, drawing 3 and losing 1 game. the only loss coming against Alianza 3-0 and 2 games AGuila won by 4 goals or more (4–1 against Atletico Marte and 5–1 against Once Municipal. Aguila will win the title by 3 points over the Juventud Olimpica.

For the 1964 season, The club went through several changes losing Costan Rican Fernando Jimenez, Fito Fuentes to season long surgery in Mexico, retirement of Saul Molina due to a serious knee injury, and Catuto Lopez to UES. The club made some big changes including two costan Rican players Tarcisio Guillén and Rafael la pulga Mena, Honduran Vladimiro Rosa, and ypouth players Rene Mena and Efrain Merlos. The club were able ton win their second back to back titles, by winning 12 games, drawing 5 and losing 1, this was despite losing Vladimiro Rosa to injury and Juan Francisco Barraza on a month long loan for São Paulo FC.

=== Fifth Championship ===
After 2 dominate season by rivals Alianza, The board decided to make some big changes which included starting pre-season camp early, hired Brazilian Silas da Silva. The club hired world cup winner Brazilian player Zózimo. The season started strong, however towards the end of the season, Silas da Silva left due to personal reason. Zózimo had player-coach role, with two games remaining, Aguila were behind FAS by three points, Aguila won the rivalry match 1–0 with the lone goal against Moises Gonzalez. In the final match, On 10 November 1968, Aguila beat Sonsonate 3-0 thanks to goals from (Juan Ramon Martinez brace and own goal from Coutinho). While rivals FAS 1–0 against Alianza with the sole goal coming from Panamian Luis Tapia.

=== Titles ===
C.D. Águila ranks second in the number of championships won in El Salvador with fifteen titles. The two most successful managers in the club history are Conrado Miranda (1959, 1975, 1976) and Argentinian Hugo Coria (Apertura 1999, Apertura 2000, Clausura 2001) with three titles each, Juan Francisco Barraza (1972, 1983) and Victor Manuel Ochoa (1963, 1964) with two titles each, while Honduran Carlos Padilla (1960), Brazilian Zózimo (1968), Chilean Hernán Carrasco Vivanco (1986) and Serbian-Salvadoran Vladan Vićević (Clausura 2006) won one title each. They were also winners of the Copa President in 2000 and won the CONCACAF Champions League.

The members of the team that conquered the first championship in 1959 were Luis Alberto López, Rodolfo Fuentes, Justiniano Jiménez, Manuel Larios, Raúl Vásquez, Raúl Bonilla, Raúl Lizano, Juan Francisco Barraza, Juan Antonio Merlos, and Saúl Molina.

== Sponsorship ==
Companies that Águila currently has sponsorship deals for the 2026–2027 season includes:

- (England) Umbro – Official kit suppliers
- (United States) Pepsi – Official sponsors
- (El Salvador) Canal 4 – Official TV sponsors
- (El Salvador) La Pampa El Volcán – Official sponsors
- (El Salvador) GanaPlay - Official sponsors

== Stadium ==
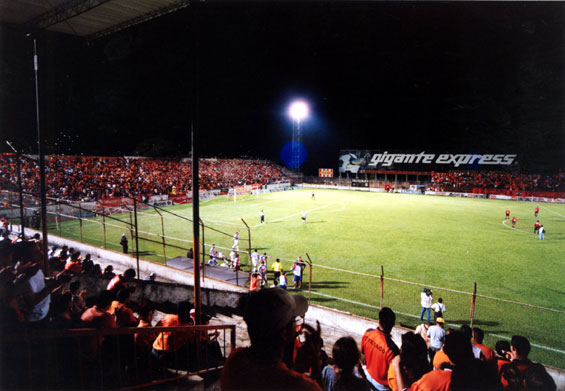
Night view of the Estadio Juan Francisco Barraza.

- Estadio Juan Francisco Barraza (1956–Present)
  - Estadio Cuscatlán; San Salvador (2012, 2016–2017, 2025-) games in the CONCACAF Champions League and played in Clausura 2016 during Estadio Juan Francisco Barraza renovation.
  - Estadio Flor Blanca; San Salvador (TBD) International games prior to the building of Estadio Cuscatlán
  - Estadio Las Delicias; Santa Tecla (2023–Present) International games

Águila plays its home games at Estadio Juan Francisco Barraza located in San Miguel. The stadium has a capacity of 10,000 people.

== Colours and crest ==
Since the club foundation the clubs have always played in orange with black stripes shirt, black shorts and orange socks.

While the club alternative kit is Black with Orange stripes.

- Home

1985-1986	2005–06	2007–08	2009	2010–11	2012–13	2014–15	2015	2024-2025	2025-2026	2026-Present

- Away

2015	2016	2024-2025	2025-Present

== Statistics and records ==
TBD holds the record for most Águila appearances, having played TBD first-team matches from TBD to TBD. The record for Águila's most capped international player is Rudis Corrales with 77 caps (33 while at the club), Arnold Cruz of Honduras is Águila's most capped foreign international player with 55 caps.

Luis Ramírez Zapata is Águila's all-time top goalscorer, with 184 goals. other players have also scored over 100 goals for Águila: Hugo Coria and the previous goalscoring record-holder Félix Pineda (1971–1983).

== Rivalries ==
Águila's biggest rivalries are with Alianza, Luis Ángel Firpo and FAS. Together, these teams form the "Big Four" of Salvadoran football, and are the primary title contenders each season.

The rivalry stems not only from their competitiveness, but from the economic, political, and cultural clashes between the cities of San Miguel, Santa Ana and San Salvador, where the other three clubs are based.

=== El Clásico ===
Of those rivalries, Águila's rivalry with FAS is the strongest and most passionate. That rivalry is traditionally referred to as El Clásico. The first in the series took place on 17 May 1959, and ended in a 1–1 draw. The most recent match was a 2–2 draw on the 24th of September, 2023. The teams have played 255 matches in all competitions, Aguila winning 81, FAS 92, and the remaining 82 having been drawn.

=== El Derbi Migueleño ===
The rivalry between Aguila and Dragón is known as the "El Derbi Migueleño" due to the fact that both teams are based in San Miguel.

The intense feelings between the two sides began early on due to the close proximity and the switching of players between the clubs. The biggest defection occurred in the 1950s when legendary players Juan Francisco Barraza and left the championship side of Dragon to Aguila and started a dynasty. The sole final played between the two teams ended 1–0 to Dragon. The most recent match was a 4–1 victory by Aguila on the 26 March 2025. The teams have played 87 matches in all competitions, Aguila winning 52, Dragon 12, and the remaining 24 having been drawn.

== Honours ==
Águila is historically the third most successful team in El Salvador football, as they have won the second most championships. They are also one of El Salvador's most successful team in international competitions, having won one trophy. Águila is one of only three clubs to have won the CONCACAF Champions' Cup.

=== Domestic honours ===
==== Leagues ====
- Primera División Salvadoran and predecessors
  - Champions (17) : 1959, 1960–61, 1963–64, 1964, 1967–68, 1972, 1975–76, 1976–77, 1983, 1987–88, Apertura 1999, Apertura 2000, Clausura 2001, Clausura 2006, Clausura 2012, Clausura 2019, Apertura 2023
- Segunda División Salvadoran and predecessors
  - Champions (1) : 1958
- Tercera División Salvadoran and predecessors
  - Champions (1) : 1950

==== Cups ====
- Copa President and predecessors
  - Champions (1) : 1999–2000
- Campeón de Campeones
  - Winners (1): 2018–2019
- Supacopa de Campeones
  - Winners (1): 2024

=== CONCACAF ===
- CONCACAF Champions' Cup
  - Champions (1) : 1976
- UNCAF Interclub Cup
  - Runners up (1) : 1973

== Current squad ==
Updated August, 2026 Note: Flags indicate national team as defined under FIFA eligibility rules; some limited exceptions apply. Players may hold more than one non-FIFA nationality.

No.	Pos.	Nation	Player
1	GK	ESA	Jairo Guardado
3	DF	COL	Stiven Dávila (Captain)
4	DF	ESA	Daniel Márquez
5	DF	ESA	Oscar Rodriguez
6	MF	ESA	Dixon Rivas
7	DF	ESA	Tereso Benitez
8	MF	ESA	Bryan Amaya
9	FW	ARG	Federico Andrada
10	MF	ESP	Diego Gregori
11	FW	ESA	Ricardo Villatoro
13	MF	ESA	Joel Turcios
14	MF	ESA	Jairo Martínez
16	MF	ESA	Alexander Marquez
19	MF	ESA	Walter Chiguila
22	GK	ESA	Benji Villalobos (vice-captain)
23	FW	ARG	Santiago Ayala
24	MF	ESA	Carlos Pena
27	MF	ESA	Marcelo Díaz
28	DF	ESA	Ronald Rodríguez (vice-captain)
30	FW	ESA	Carlos Garay
33	DF	ESA	David Parada
36	DF	ESA	Jefferson Perla
50	MF	ESA	Marvin Benitez
—	FW	ESA	Santos Ortíz

No.	Pos.	Nation	Player
15	MF	ESA	Melqui Prudencio
17	FW	ESA	Eduardo Cruz
29	FW	ESA	Allan Benitez
38	DF	ESA	José Guatemala

=== Players with dual citizenship ===
- (United States) (El Salvador) Allan Benitez

=== Out on loan ===
Note: Flags indicate national team as defined under FIFA eligibility rules; some limited exceptions apply. Players may hold more than one non-FIFA nationality.

No.	Pos.	Nation	Player
—	DF	ESA	Julio Sibrián (at Alianza for the 2026–2027 season)
—	MF	ESA	TBD (at TBD for the 2026–2027 season)

No.	Pos.	Nation	Player
—	MF	ESA	TBD (at TBD for the 2026–2027 season)
—	MF	ESA	TBD (at TBD for the 2026–2027 season)

=== In ===
Note: Flags indicate national team as defined under FIFA eligibility rules; some limited exceptions apply. Players may hold more than one non-FIFA nationality.

No.	Pos.	Nation	Player
—	DF	ESA	Daniel Márquez (From Cacahuatique)
—	FW	ESA	Alexander Márquez (From Cacahuatique)
—	MF	ESA	Walter Chiguila (From Fuerte San Francisco)
—		ARG	Santiago Ayala (From Provincial Osorno)

No.	Pos.	Nation	Player
—		ESA	Óscar Rodríguez (From Alianza)
—		ESA	Carlos Pena (Loaned From Nacional FC)
—		COL	Yehider Ibargüen (Loaned From UTC)

=== Out ===
Note: Flags indicate national team as defined under FIFA eligibility rules; some limited exceptions apply. Players may hold more than one non-FIFA nationality.

No.	Pos.	Nation	Player
—	DF	ARG	Franco Cacace (To TBD)
—	MF	ESA	Tomás Granitto (To TBD)
—	DF	ESA	Walter Pineda (To TBD)
—		ESA	Carlos Ortiz (To TBD)

No.	Pos.	Nation	Player
—		ESA	Melvin Cruz (To TBD)
—		ESA	Erick Cabalceta (To TBD)
—		ESA	Tomás Granitto (To TBD)
—		ESA	TBD (To TBD)

== Personnel ==
=== Coaching staff ===
As of June 2026

Position	Staff
Manager	(Argentina) Santiago Davio (*)
Assistant Managers	(Argentina) Lucas Gómez Barroche (*)
Reserve Manager	(El Salvador) Isaac Zelaya (*)
Under 17 Manager	(El Salvador) Luis Ramírez Zapata (*)
Ladies Manager	(El Salvador) Amilcar Guzman (*)
Fitness Coach	(Argentina) Ignacio Naveira (*)
Goalkeeper Coach	(El Salvador) Sergio Munoz (*)
Sport Director	(El Salvador) Mario Mayén Meza (*)
Team Doctor	(El Salvador) Dr. Pedro Grande (*)
General Physician	(El Salvador) Dr. Salvador Beltrán
Knesliogiocal	(El Salvador) Dr. Moises Gomez (*)
Utility	(El Salvador) Roric Sigaran and Marvin Sanchez (*)
Sub-Utility	(El Salvador) Ricardo Morreira
Sub-Utility	(El Salvador) Franklin Villatoro

=== Management ===
As of June 2026

Position	Staff
Owner	(El Salvador) TBD
President	(El Salvador) Rigoberto Ortiz Ostorga
Vice President	(El Salvador) David Ventura
Secretary	(El Salvador) Jose Victorino Villatoro
Treasurer	(El Salvador) Carlos Argueta
First Speaker	(El Salvador) Juan Pablo Vargas
Second Speaker	(El Salvador) TBD
Third Speaker	(El Salvador) Carlos Espinoza
managing director	(El Salvador) José Argueta
Executive Manager	(El Salvador) Miguel Chahin
Press Manager	(El Salvador) Óskar Cruz
Manager of the academy	(El Salvador) Roberto Montoya
Scout Manager	(El Salvador)

== Presidential history ==
Aguila have had numerous presidents over the course of their history, some of which have been the owners of the club, others have been honorary presidents, here is a complete list of them.

Name	Years
(El Salvador) Miguel Charlaix F.	1959–66
(El Salvador) Federico Garcia Prieto H.	1967–68
(El Salvador) Enrique Garcia-Prieto H.	1969–70
(El Salvador) Carlos Garcia-Prieto H.	1971–74
(El Salvador) Nino Dürler Vargas	1975–77
(El Salvador) Federico Garcia-Prieto H.	1977–78
(El Salvador) Ernesto Muyshondt Parker	1979–81

Name	Years
(El Salvador) Federico Garcia-Prieto N.	1982
(El Salvador) Carlos Garcia-Prieto Hirleman	1983–84
(El Salvador) Reynaldo López Nuila	1985–89
(El Salvador) Carlos Garcia-Prieto Hirleman	1989–98
(El Salvador) Alejandro González Arguello	1998–05
(El Salvador) Lisandro Pohl	2005–06
(El Salvador) Salvador Galeas	2006–09

Name	Years
(El Salvador) Will Salgado	2009–10
(El Salvador) Julio Sosa	2010–13
(El Salvador) Pedro Fausto Arieta	2014–2016
(El Salvador) Pedro Arieta Iglesias	2016–2018
(El Salvador) Óskar Cruz (interim)	2018
(El Salvador) Doctor José Victorino Villatoro	2018–2019
(El Salvador) Alexander Menjívar	2019–2020
(El Salvador) José Raúl Díaz	2020–2021
(El Salvador) Alejandro González	2022–2024
(El Salvador) Victor Villalta	2025
(El Salvador) Rigoberto Ortiz Ostorga	2025–present

== Notable players ==
=== World Cup winners ===
Players that have played for Águila in their career and won a World Cup:

- (Brazil) Zózimo (Sweden 1958 & Chile 1962)

=== South American Championship runners-up ===
Players that have played for Águila in their career and finished up as runners-up South American Championship:

- (Brazil) Zózimo (1957 South American Championship)

=== World Cup players ===
Players that have played for Águila in their career and played in a World Cup:

- (Brazil) Zózimo (1958 FIFA World Cup & 1962 FIFA World Cup)
- (El Salvador) Mario Castillo (1982 FIFA World Cup)
- (El Salvador) Luis Guevara Mora (1982 FIFA World Cup)
- (El Salvador) José Francisco Jovel (1982 FIFA World Cup)
- (El Salvador) Juan Ramón Martínez (1970 FIFA World Cup)
- (El Salvador) Sergio Méndez (1970 FIFA World Cup)
- (El Salvador) Saturnino Osorio (1970 FIFA World Cup)
- (El Salvador) Joaquín Ventura (1982 FIFA World Cup)
- (El Salvador) Luis Ramírez Zapata (1982 FIFA World Cup)
- (Honduras) Ramón Maradiaga (1982 FIFA World Cup)

=== Team captains ===
Name	Years
(El Salvador) Juan Francisco Barraza	1963–1964
(El Salvador) Sergio Méndez	1965
(El Salvador) Jorge Bucaro	1968-1969
(El Salvador) Luis Rivas	1973–1975
(Brazil) David Pinho	1976
(El Salvador) Luis Rivas	1977-1978
(El Salvador) Francisco Jovel Cruz	1979–1981
(El Salvador) Félix Pineda	1982-1983
(El Salvador) Luis Ramírez Zapata	1984
(El Salvador) Mario Castillo	1986–1987
(Honduras) Ramón Maradiaga	1988
(El Salvador) Amadeo Machado	1990
(El Salvador) Pedro Mayen	1991
(Argentina) Hugo Coria	1991–1992
(El Salvador) Wilfredo Figueroa	1994–1999
(El Salvador) Mario Mayén Meza	1999–2000
(El Salvador) José Alexander Amaya	2001–2004
(El Salvador) Jorge Humberto Rodriguez	2005–2006
(Honduras) Fabio Ulloa	2006–2007
(El Salvador) Victor Velasquez	2008
(Colombia) Hermes Martinez Misal	2009
(El Salvador) William Torres Alegria	2010
(El Salvador) Luis Anaya	2011–2012
(El Salvador) Deris Umanzor	2013–2016
(El Salvador) Henry Romero	2016–2017
(El Salvador) Deris Umanzor	2017
(El Salvador) Benji Villalobos	2018–2019
(Colombia) Andrés Quejada	2019–2021
(El Salvador) Fredy Espinoza	2021
(El Salvador) Benji Villalobos	2022
(El Salvador) Gerson Mayen	2023–2024
(El Salvador) Darwin Ceren	2024–2025
(El Salvador) Marcelo Díaz	2026–present

== Head coaches ==
Aguila has had various coaches since its formation in 1956. In 1956, Argentinian Gregorio Bundio Núñez became the club's first full-time head coach. Conrado Miranda is the club's most successful coach, having won three Primera División titles, and one CONCACAF Champions' Cup 1976, followed closely by Hugo Coria who won two primera titles, and won Copa Presidente 1999–2000, and Victor Manuel Ochoa who won two titles as well. Hugo Coria has served five terms as head coach.

The following managers won at least one trophy when in charge of Aguila
Name	Period	Trophies
(El Salvador) Conrado Miranda † (1928–2021)	1959–1960, 1975–1978	3 Primera División de Fútbol Profesional (1959,1975–76, 1976–77), 1 CONCACAF Champions' Cup (1976)
(Argentina) Hugo Coria	1999–2000, 2002, 2003–2004, 2011, 2020	2 Primera División de Fútbol Profesional (Apertura 1999, Apertura 2000), 1 Copa Presidente
(El Salvador) Victor Manuel Ochoa † ()	1963–1965	2 Primera División de Fútbol Profesional (1963–64, 1964)
(El Salvador) Juan Francisco Barraza † (1935–1997)	1971–1973, 1981–1983	2 Primera División de Fútbol Profesional (1972, 1983)
(Honduras) Carlos Padilla † (1934–2014)	1960	1 Primera División de Fútbol Profesional (1960–1961)
(Brazil) Zózimo † (1932–1977)	1968	1 Primera División de Fútbol Profesional (1967–1968)
(Chile) Hernán Carrasco Vivanco † (1923–2023)	1974, 1986–1988	1 Primera División de Fútbol Profesional (1987–88)
(Uruguay) Saul Lorenzo Rivero † (1954–2022)	2001	1 Primera División de Fútbol Profesional (Clausura 2001)
(Serbia) (El Salvador) Vladan Vićević	2006	1 Primera División de Fútbol Profesional (Clausura 2006)
(El Salvador) Víctor Coreas	2012–2013	1 Primera División de Fútbol Profesional (Clausura 2012)
(El Salvador) Carlos Romero	2018–2019	1 Primera División de Fútbol Profesional (Clausura 2019)
(Argentina) Agustín Vicente Noriega † ()	1956–1959	1 Segunda División Salvadorean
(Argentina) Ernesto Corti	2023–2024	1 Primera División de Fútbol Profesional (2023 Apertura)

== Kit makers ==
Years	Kit manufacturers
1956–1980	Nil shirt Maker
1984–1987	(United States) Pony
1987–1992	Nil Shirt Sponsor
1997	(El Salvador) AVIVA
1998-1999	(Mexico) Garcis
2000	(Spain) Joma
2001–02	(El Salvador) Galaxia
2003–04	(England) Umbro
2004–2005	(El Salvador) AVIVA
2004–07	(Italy) Diadora
2007–09	(Spain) Joma
2010	(United States) Nike
2011–12	(El Salvador) Galaxia
2013	(Italy) Diadora
2014–2018	(Spain) Joma
2018–2019	(El Salvador) Maca
2019–Present	(England) Umbro

== Other departments ==
=== Football ===
==== Reserve team ====
The reserve team serves mainly as the final stepping stone for promising young players under the age of 21 before being promoted to the main team. The second team is coached by Isaac Zelaya. the team played in the Primera División Reserves, their greatest successes were winning the Reserve championships in Apertura 2001, Apertura 2005, Apertura 2007, Clausura 2017, Apertura 2017, Clausura 2019, Apertura 2023.

Águila's youth squad plays in the ten-team Primera División Reserves (El Salvador). Current members of the squad are: As of October 2024 Note: Flags indicate national team as defined under FIFA eligibility rules; some limited exceptions apply. Players may hold more than one non-FIFA nationality.

No.	Pos.	Nation	Player
31		ESA	Ronaldo Gutierrez
35		ESA	Kevin Larios
38		ESA	Yair Saenz
39		ESA	Ever Gomez
41		ESA	Jefferson Garcia
45		ESA	Cesar Robles
46		ESA	Eduardo Cruz
47		ESA	Jose Santos
49		ESA	Jeovanny Quintanilla
50		ESA	Diego Jimenez
52		ESA	Carlos Garay
54		ESA	Jasson Ayala

No.	Pos.	Nation	Player
55		ESA	Alexander Amaya
56		ESA	Jose Reyes
57		ESA	Fernando Paniagua
60		ESA	Adonys Amaya
69		ESA	Alejandro Guevara
71		ESA	Wilmer Blanco
79		ESA	Jefferson Perla
85		ESA	Jose Gutierrez
90		ESA	Osmin Loza

Years	Coach Name
TBD–TBD	(El Salvador) TBD
TBD–TBD	(El Salvador) TBD
2013	(El Salvador) Omar Sevilla
2014	(El Salvador) Alvaro Misael Alfaro
2015-2017	(El Salvador) Marvin "la Perica" Benítez
2019	(El Salvador) Santos Rivera
2020–2021	(El Salvador) Kilmar Martinez
2021-2024	(El Salvador) Eduardo Castillo
2024–2025	(El Salvador) Roberto Melgar
2025	(El Salvador) Joaquin Perez
2026–Present	(El Salvador) Isaac Zelaya

==== Junior teams ====
The youth team (under 17 and under 15) has produced some of El Salvador's top football players, including TBD and TBD. The club greatest successes in Primera División Under-17 League were winning the 2017 Clausura, 2018 Clausura and 2026 Clausura. The Under 17 finished 3rd place at the 2018 UNCAF U-17 Interclub Cup, the highest finish internationally done by a Salvadoran team in that age range.

Years	Coach Name
2014	(El Salvador) TBD
2015	(Brazil) Eraldo Correia
2016-2017	(El Salvador) TBD
2018-2019	(El Salvador) Kílmar Jiménez
2019-2023	Hiatus
2023–2024	(El Salvador) Amilcar Guzman
2024	(El Salvador) Luis Ramírez Zapata
2025–Present	(El Salvador) Manuel Ponce

=== Current squad ===
As of: May 9, 2026 Note: Flags indicate national team as defined under FIFA eligibility rules; some limited exceptions apply. Players may hold more than one non-FIFA nationality.

No.	Pos.	Nation	Player
66		ESA	Victor Ortiz
67		ESA	Dante Rios
71		ESA	Kevin Umanzor
73		ESA	Odir Chavez
74		ESA	Roger Soto
76		ESA	Bryan Flores
78		ESA	Isaac Portillo
79		ESA	Jefrey Ascensio
80		ESA	Luis Benavides
81		ESA	Billy Urbina
82		ESA	Omar Rodriguez

No.	Pos.	Nation	Player
83		ESA	Marlon Coreas
85		ESA	Nestor Mendoza
86		ESA	Jonathan Mancia
87		ESA	Emmanuel Guevara
88		ESA	Walter Canas
89		ESA	Iker Zelaya
92		ESA	Fernando Castillo
93		ESA	Jason Agudelo
94		ESA	Osteen Saenz

=== World Cup players ===
Players that have played for Aguila in their career and played in a U-17 World Cup:

- (El Salvador) Jefferson Perla (2025)
- (El Salvador) Jose Guatemala (2025)

==== Women's team ====
The women's first team, which is led by head coach Amilcar Guzman, features several members of the El Salvador national ladies team. Their greatest successes were reaching the semi-finals the in Apertura 2020.

Years	Coach Name
2017–2018	(El Salvador) TBD
2019-2020	(El Salvador) Walter Moreno
2022-2024	(El Salvador) José de la Paz Portillo
2024–Present	(El Salvador) Amilcar Guzman

=== Current squad ===
As of: January, 2026 Note: Flags indicate national team as defined under FIFA eligibility rules; some limited exceptions apply. Players may hold more than one non-FIFA nationality.

No.	Pos.	Nation	Player
—		ESA	TBD
—		ESA	TBD
—		ESA	Raquel Flores
—		ESA	Greisy Flores
—		ESA	Sara Flores
—		ESA	TBD
—		ESA	TBD
—		ESA	TBD
—		ESA	TBD

No.	Pos.	Nation	Player
—		ESA	Sheila Mancia
—		ESA	Wendy Lizama
—		ESA	TBD
—		ESA	TBD
—		ESA	TBD
—		ESA	TBD

=== In ===
Note: Flags indicate national team as defined under FIFA eligibility rules; some limited exceptions apply. Players may hold more than one non-FIFA nationality.

No.	Pos.	Nation	Player
—		ESA	Ana Miranda (From Isidro Metapan Femenino)
—		ESA	Sabrina Larios (From Dragon Femenino)
—		ESA	Naomi Arias (From Dragon Femenino)
—		ESA	Dayana Chavarria (From Dragon Femenino)
—		ESA	Mayra Hernandez (From Fuerte San Francisco Femenino)
—		ESA	Angy Martinez (From Municipal Limeno Femenino)

No.	Pos.	Nation	Player
—		ESA	Emely Perez (From Dragon Femenino)
—		ESA	Dalia Herrera (From Dragon Femenino)
—		ESA	Alejandra Pineda (From TBD)
—		ESA	Nicol Molina (From TBD)
—		ESA	Nahary Vasquez (From TBD)
—		ESA	Nicole Martinez (From TBD)

=== Out ===
Note: Flags indicate national team as defined under FIFA eligibility rules; some limited exceptions apply. Players may hold more than one non-FIFA nationality.

No.	Pos.	Nation	Player
—		ESA	Lesley Cisneros (To TBD)
—		ESA	Flor Saravia (To TBD)
—		ESA	Hesly Avalos (To TBD)
—		ESA	Georgina Giron (To TBD)
—		ESA	Wendy Guardado (To TBD)
—		ESA	Johana Martinez (To TBD)
—		ESA	Michelle Velasquez (To TBD)
—		ESA	Paolo Marquez (To Fuerte San Francisco Femenino)

No.	Pos.	Nation	Player
—		ESA	Celina Franco (To Fuerte San Francisco Femenino)
—		ESA	Yenifer Treminio (To TBD)
—		ESA	Sofia Hernandez (To Fuerte San Francisco Femenino)
—		ESA	Gabriela Zapata (To TBD)
—		ESA	Gabriela Chavez (From Fuerte San Francisco Femenino)
—		ESA	Jennifer Palacios (From Fuerte San Francisco Femenino)
—		ESA	Wendy Lizama (From Fuerte San Francisco Femenino)

=== Other sports ===
Aguila has other departments for a variety of sports.

==== Basketball ====
Aguila Básquetbol Club or Águila BC for short was founded on TBD and play Liga Mayor de Baloncesto (LMB) which is the highest level in El Salvador league tier. the club is led by head coach Argentinian Pablo Epeloa, the club features several key members including American Marquise Mosley and TBD. Their greatest successes were winning the 2015 Apertura and the Clausura 2022.

They currently play the Cancha Alvarez y Biblioteca e Infocentro Municipal, San Miguel. Previous coach: Roberto Carrillo Notable players:

2020s

- (Panama) Pablo Rivas
- (United States) (El Salvador) Marquise Mosley

2010s

- (Cuba) Osmel Oliva
- (Colombia) Michael Jackson

Years	Coach Name	Honours
2014-2015	(El Salvador) Roberto Carrillo	2015 Apertura
2016	(El Salvador) TBD	
2016-2017	(El Salvador) Roberto Carrillo	
2017–2018	(El Salvador) TBD	
2017-2019	Hiatus	Nil
2019-2020	(El Salvador) TBD	
2020-2021	(El Salvador) TBD	
2022	(Venezuela) Sergio Vicente	
2022	(Argentina) Pablo Epeloa	Clausura 2022
2023–Present	Hiatus	Nil

==== Baseball ====
Aguila Béisbol Club was founded in 2016 and play Liga Nacional de Béisbol (LNB) which is the highest level in El Salvador league tier. the club is led by head coach Venezuelan Jesús Cartagena, the club features several key members including Puerto Rican Bryan Vásquez and TBD. Their greatest successes was TBD

==== Volleyball ====
Aguila Voleibol Club was founded in 2016 and play Campeonaro Nacional which is the highest level in El Salvador league tier. the club is led by head coach TBD, the club features several key members including TBD and TBD. Their greatest successes were reaching the TBD.
