= Juan Francisco Barraza =

Salvadoran footballer (1935–1997)

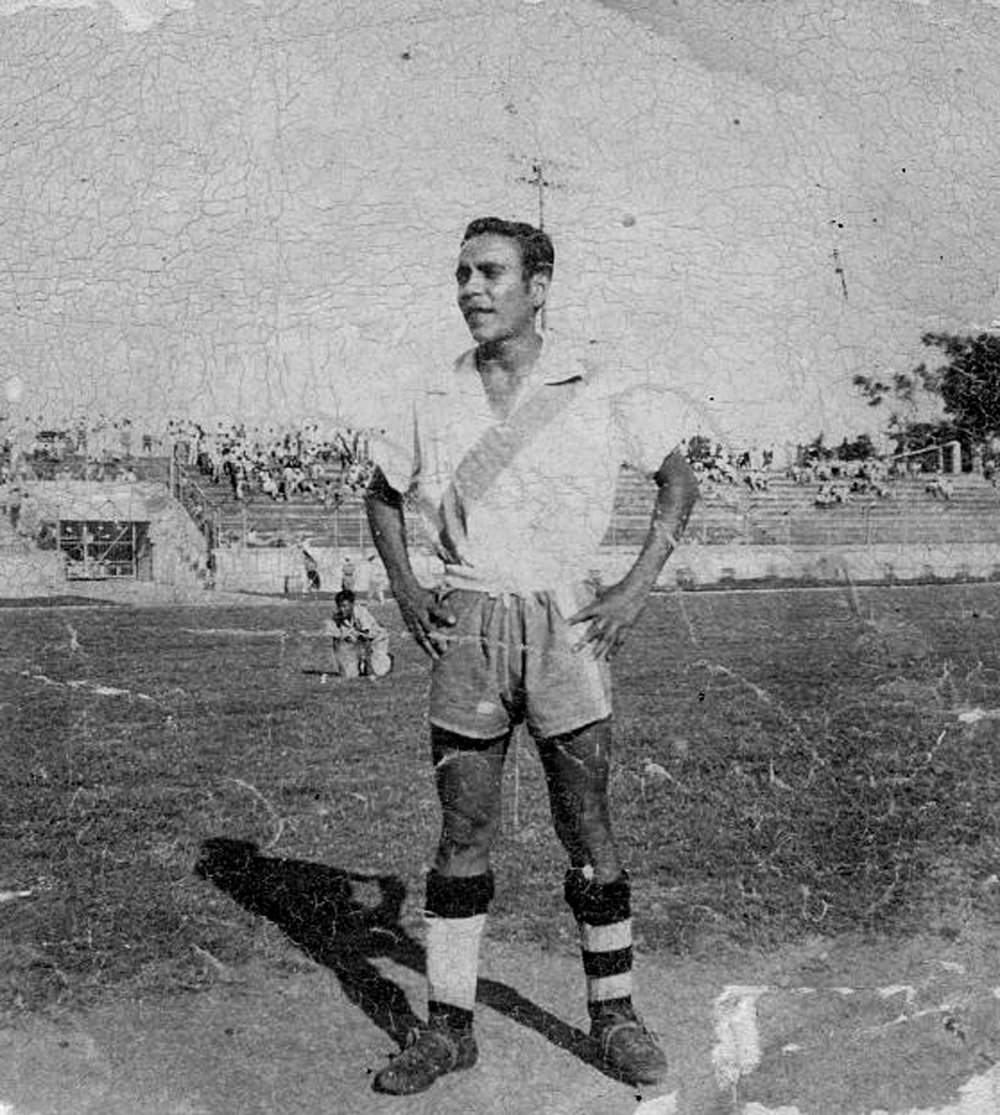

Personal information
- Full name: Juan Francisco Barraza Flores
- Date of birth: March 12, 1935
- Place of birth: San Miguel, El Salvador
- Date of death: December 17, 1997 (aged 62)
- Place of death: Zacami, El Salvador
- Position: Midfielder

Youth career
- 1943–1949: C.D. Corona

Senior career*
Years	Team	Apps	(Gls)
1950–1952	C.D. Corona		
1953–1957	Dragón		
1958–1970	Águila		

International career
1953–1969	El Salvador	40	(19)

Managerial career
- 1970–1973: Águila
- 1974–1975: Municipal Limeño
- 1980–1982: FAS
- 1983: Águila
- 1984–1985: Dragón
- Alianza
Medal record
Representing El Salvador
Men's Football
Central American and Caribbean Games
Gold medal – first place	1954 El Salvador	Team competition
- * Club domestic league appearances and goals

Juan Francisco Barraza Flores (March 12, 1935 – December 17, 1997) was a Salvadoran football player and manager.

He is widely regarded as one of the best Salvadoran footballers of all time.

== Career ==
Born in the district of San Miguel as the son of Maria de la Cruz Barraza and Juan de Dios Flores, he attended Dr Antonio Rosales primary school.

=== Early years ===
Barraza began playing soccer in grade school and he joined C.D. Corona when he was eight years old.

=== Professional career ===
He made his professional debut with Dragón on 15 February 1953 against El Palermo de Guatemala. A year later he won the Central American and Caribbean Games with El Salvador. In 1958 he joined Águila, with whom he won several league titles.

On 8 June 1969 he played his final international game against Honduras. He scored 13 goals for the national team in official games between 1959 and 1963. He scored 24 in 64 games including unofficial matches.

While playing for C.D. Corona, Dragón and finally Águila, where he earned them several titles, he was idolized by soccer fans because of his technical brilliance and pure skill.

Barraza was recognized for his excellence on the soccer fields by clubs from Brazil (in particular São Paulo) and Mexico who were so desperate to sign him up.

=== Retirement and death ===
He officially retired in 1970, and on December 17, 1997 Cariota died due to cardiac problems in Zacamil hospital in El Salvador. The municipal stadium in his native department of San Miguel, is named Estadio Juan Francisco "Cariota" Barraza in his honor.

=== Nickname ===
The Cariota nickname was inherited through his parent, which is an extremely common custom in El Salvador.

== Achievements ==
Year	Finish	Team	Tournament	Role	Notes
1950	Champion	Dragón	1st Division El Salvador	Player	
1952	Champion	Dragón	1st Division El Salvador	Player	
1954	Gold Medal	El Salvador	Central American and Caribbean Games	Player	
1959	Champion	Águila	1st Division El Salvador	Player	
1960-61	Champion	Águila	1st Division El Salvador	Player	
1963-64	Champion	Águila	1st Division El Salvador	Player	
1964	Champion	Águila	1st Division El Salvador	Player	
1967-68	Champion	Águila	1st Division El Salvador	Player	
1972	Champions	Águila	1st Division El Salvador	Coach	
1981	Champions	FAS	1st Division El Salvador	Coach	
1983	Champions	Águila	1st Division El Salvador	Coach	
