= 1955 CCCF Championship squads =

These are the squads for the countries that played in the 1955 CCCF Championship.

The age listed for each player is on 14 August 1955, the first day of the tournament. The numbers of caps and goals listed for each player do not include any matches played after the start of the tournament. The club listed is the club for which the player last played a competitive match before the tournament. The nationality for each club reflects the national association (not the league) to which the club is affiliated. A flag is included for coaches who are of a different nationality than their own national team.

== Aruba ==
Head coach: (Argentina) Ángel Botta

No.	Pos.	Player	Date of birth (age)	Caps	Goals	Club
1	GK	Marco Tromp	18 June 1929 (aged 26)	3	0	(Aruba Football Federation) Aruba Juniors
2	GK	Lucas Hernández	17 October 1930 (aged 24)	6	0	(Aruba Football Federation) Aruba Juniors
3	DF	Paul Johan Díaz	19 December 1936 (aged 18)	0	0	(Aruba Football Federation) La Fama
4	DF	Joy La Rosa	25 October 1933 (aged 21)	0	0	(Aruba Football Federation) Aruba Juniors
5	DF	Gabriel Arcangel Kelly	1929 (aged 25–26)	0	0	(Aruba Football Federation) Racing Aruba
6	DF	Siméon Molina	18 February 1932 (aged 23)	3	0	(Curaçao Football Federation) Jong Holland
7	DF	Raymundo Kemp	31 October 1922 (aged 32)	4	2	(Aruba Football Federation) Aruba Juniors
8	MF	Luis Antonio Brion		0	0	(Aruba Football Federation) Aruba Juniors
9	MF	Ricardo Helder	30 October 1927 (aged 27)	4	0	(Aruba Football Federation) Racing Aruba
10	MF	Rudolfo Dirksz	17 October 1932 (aged 22)	0	0	(Aruba Football Federation) Racing Aruba
11	MF	Dominico Pérez	26 September 1931 (aged 23)	0	0	(Aruba Football Federation) Aruba Juniors
12	MF	Gregorio Picus	4 January 1932 (aged 23)	0	0	(Aruba Football Federation) Racing Aruba
13	MF	José Boye		0	0	(Aruba Football Federation) Racing Aruba
14	MF	Jacinto Werleman	11 September 1930 (aged 24)	0	0	(Aruba Football Federation) Estrella
15	MF	Juan Briezen	9 August 1928 (aged 27)	4	2	(Curaçao Football Federation) Sithoc
16	MF	Julio Jansen	20 December 1928 (aged 26)	6	3	(Aruba Football Federation) Racing Aruba
17	FW	Adriaan Brokke	20 December 1928 (aged 26)	2	0	(Aruba Football Federation) Aruba Juniors
18	FW	Olimpio Rodríguez	15 April 1933 (aged 22)	0	0	(Aruba Football Federation) Aruba Juniors
19	FW	Adelberto Tromp	24 February 1934 (aged 21)	0	0	(Aruba Football Federation) Hollandia
20	FW	Jorge Brion	23 April 1933 (aged 22)	1	0	(Aruba Football Federation) Aruba Juniors
21	FW	Roland Herbert Williams	6 January 1937 (aged 18)	0	0	(Aruba Football Federation) Dakota
22	FW	Óscar Steba		0	0	(Aruba Football Federation) Dakota
23	FW	Alberto Penja	16 February 1931 (aged 24)	0	0	(Aruba Football Federation) Trappers

== Costa Rica ==
Head coach: Alfredo Piedra

No.	Pos.	Player	Date of birth (age)	Caps	Goals	Club
1	GK	Hernán Alvarado Guerrero	25 November 1932 (aged 22)	3	0	(Costa Rican Football Federation) La Libertad
2	GK	Mario Pérez Rodríguez	7 April 1936 (aged 19)	0	0	(Costa Rican Football Federation) Saprissa
3	GK	Carlos Alvarado Villalobos	11 December 1927 (aged 27)	4	0	(Costa Rican Football Federation) Alajuelense
4	DF	Max Villalobos	26 January 1928 (aged 27)	0	0	(Costa Rican Football Federation) Herediano
5	DF	Jorge Solís Vargas	25 March 1932 (aged 20)	0	0	(Costa Rican Football Federation) La Libertad
6	DF	Mario Cordero	7 April 1930 (aged 25)	6	2	(Costa Rican Football Federation) Saprissa
7	DF	Reynaldo Orozco	24 November 1932 (aged 22)	0	0	(Costa Rican Football Federation) La Libertad
8	DF	Alex Sánchez	20 July 1930 (aged 22)	0	0	(Costa Rican Football Federation) Saprissa
9	MF	Isidro Williams	22 December 1922 (aged 32)	5	0	(Costa Rican Football Federation) Uruguay de Coronado
10	MF	Edgar Quesada	16 August 1931 (aged 23)	9	1	(Costa Rican Football Federation) Herediano
11	MF	Édgar Esquivel	27 February 1925 (aged 30)	5	1	(Costa Rican Football Federation) Herediano
12	DF	Marvin Rodríguez	26 November 1934 (aged 20)	0	0	(Costa Rican Football Federation) Saprissa
13	MF	Tulio Quirós	7 August 1930 (aged 25)	0	0	(Costa Rican Football Federation) Saprissa
14	FW	Rodolfo Herrera González	11 August 1931 (aged 24)	5	4	(Costa Rican Football Federation) Saprissa
15	FW	Carlos Gobán	14 September 1934 (aged 20)	0	0	(Costa Rican Football Federation) La Libertad
16	FW	Mario Murillo	24 January 1927 (aged 28)	0	0	(Costa Rican Football Federation) Herediano
17	FW	Jorge Monge	14 February 1938 (aged 17)	0	0	(Costa Rican Football Federation) Saprissa
18	FW	Danilo Montero Campos	21 July 1937 (aged 18)	0	0	(Costa Rican Football Federation) Herediano
19	FW	Juan Ulloa	5 February 1935 (aged 20)	0	0	(Costa Rican Football Federation) Alajuelense
20	FW	Óscar Bejarano	15 September 1932 (aged 22)	0	0	(Costa Rican Football Federation) Herediano
21	FW	Rubén Jiménez	9 December 1932 (aged 22)	0	0	(Costa Rican Football Federation) Saprissa
22	FW	Álvaro Murillo	24 November 1930 (aged 24)	5	1	(Costa Rican Football Federation) Saprissa
23	FW	Mardoqueo González	30 October 1932 (aged 22)	0	0	(Costa Rican Football Federation) La Libertad

== Cuba ==
Head coach: Emilio Muriente

No.	Pos.	Player	Date of birth (age)	Caps	Goals	Club
1	GK	Alberto Mendivel		0	0	(Football Association of Cuba) San Francisco
2	GK	Eloy Martínez		0	0	(Football Association of Cuba) Juventud Asturiana
3	DF	Jorge Macías		0	0	(Football Association of Cuba) San Francisco
4	DF	Juvenal Reyes		0	0	(Football Association of Cuba) San Francisco
5	DF	Rodolfo Portoundo		0	0	(Football Association of Cuba) San Francisco
6	DF	Ramón Peñalver	31 August 1935 (aged 19)	0	0	(Football Association of Cuba) Iberia Habana
7	MF	Mario "Pilillo" Herrera		0	0	(Football Association of Cuba) San Francisco
8	MF	Sergio Padrón	5 December 1933 (aged 21)	0	0	(Football Association of Cuba) San Francisco
9	MF	Francisco Enrique Morell		0	0	(Football Association of Cuba) Juventud Asturiana
10	MF	Agustín Mezquita		0	0	(Football Association of Cuba) San Francisco
11	MF	Antonio "Tony" Fernández		0	0	(Football Association of Cuba) Juventud Asturiana
12	MF	Antonio "Ñico" Gutiérrez		0	0	(Football Association of Cuba) San Francisco
13	MF	Orlando Ruiz		0	0	(Football Association of Cuba) San Francisco
14	FW	Genaro Carmona		0	0	(Football Association of Cuba) San Francisco
15	FW	Enrique Inda		0	0	(Football Association of Cuba) San Francisco
16	FW	Ángel Piedra		0	0	(Football Association of Cuba) San Francisco
17	FW	Ángel Bacallao		0	0	(Football Association of Cuba) Iberia Habana
18	FW	Alberto Gutiérrez		0	0	(Football Association of Cuba) San Francisco
19	FW	Armando Acevedo		0	0	(Football Association of Cuba) Juventud Asturiana
20	FW	Erasmo Carmona		0	0	(Football Association of Cuba) San Francisco

== Curaçao ==
Head coach: Pedro Celestino da Cunha

No.	Pos.	Player	Date of birth (age)	Caps	Goals	Club
1	GK	Ergilio Hato	7 November 1925 (aged 29)	8	0	(Curaçao Football Federation) Jong Holland
2	GK	Frank Paulina		0	0	(Curaçao Football Federation) Jong Holland
3	GK	Roberto Tweeboom		0	0	(Curaçao Football Federation) SUBT
4	GK	Donald Trinidad		0	0	(Curaçao Football Federation) Jong Curaçao
5	DF	Wilfred de Lanoi	12 February 1929 (aged 26)	7	0	(Curaçao Football Federation) Jong Holland
6	MF	Pedro Koolman	19 May 1933 (aged 22)	0	0	(Curaçao Football Federation) SUBT
7	DF	Wilhelm Canword	11 July 1933 (aged 22)	7	2	(Curaçao Football Federation) SUBT
8	MF	Guillermo Giribaldi	17 May 1929 (aged 26)	13	0	(Curaçao Football Federation) Sithoc
9	MF	Ludgero Adoptie		0	0	(Curaçao Football Federation) Jong Holland
10	MF	Moises Bicentini	27 December 1931 (aged 23)	3	1	(Curaçao Football Federation) SUBT
11	DF	R. Hoek		0	0	(Curaçao Football Federation) Sithoc
12	FW	Erno Jansen		0	0	(Curaçao Football Federation) Jong Holland
13	FW	Eustaquio Bernardina		0	0	(Curaçao Football Federation) Jong Holland
14	FW	Francisco Romualdo Gómez		3	1	(Curaçao Football Federation) SUBT
15	FW	Ronald de Lanoi		0	0	(Curaçao Football Federation) Veendam
16	FW	F. Daal		0	0	(Curaçao Football Federation) Jong Curaçao
17	FW	C. R. Thielman		0	0	(Curaçao Football Federation) SUBT
18	DF	Mortimer Meulens		0	0	(Curaçao Football Federation) Jong Curaçao
19	FW	Hubert Schoop		0	0	(Curaçao Football Federation) Sithoc
20	FW	Carlos Regales		0	0	(Curaçao Football Federation) Jonc Curaçao
21	DF	Ciriaco Kwidama		0	0	(Curaçao Football Federation) Sithoc
22	FW	Etlin Bodkin		0	0	(Curaçao Football Federation) Jong Curaçao
23	FW	J. F. Pikeur		0	0	(Curaçao Football Federation) SUBT

== El Salvador ==
Head coach: Carbilio Tomasino

No.	Pos.	Player	Date of birth (age)	Caps	Goals	Club
1	GK	José Manuel Garay	28 November 1925 (aged 29)	3	0	(Salvadoran Football Federation)
2	GK	Ricardo Rodríguez		0	0	(Salvadoran Football Federation)
3	DF	Mario Herrera		0	0	(Salvadoran Football Federation)
4	DF	Hugo Moreno		4	0	(Salvadoran Football Federation)
5	DF	Luis Antonio Regalado	1 October 1922 (aged 32)	18	1	(Salvadoran Football Federation) Atlético Marte
6	DF	Fermín Águila		0	0	(Salvadoran Football Federation)
7	DF	José Hernández		4	0	(Salvadoran Football Federation)
8	DF	Oscar Armando Larín		0	0	(Salvadoran Football Federation)
9	MF	Conrado Miranda	14 October 1928 (aged 26)	0	0	(Salvadoran Football Federation) Atlético Marte
10	MF	Ramón Chávez		3	0	(Salvadoran Football Federation)
11	MF	Manuel Duke		0	0	(Salvadoran Football Federation)
12	MF	Rafael Julio Corado		10	8	(Salvadoran Football Federation)
13	MF	Esteban Blanco	3 August 1929 (aged 26)	0	0	(Salvadoran Football Federation) Águila
14	FW	René Pimentel		0	0	(Salvadoran Football Federation)
15	FW	Juan Francisco Barraza	12 March 1935 (aged 20)	5	1	(Salvadoran Football Federation) Dragón
16	FW	Ricardo Valencia	5 October 1926 (aged 28)	4	0	(Salvadoran Football Federation) FAS
17	FW	Alfredo Ruano	14 October 1932 (aged 22)	0	0	(Salvadoran Football Federation) Atlético Marte
18	FW	Obdulio Hernández		0	0	(Salvadoran Football Federation)
19		Antonio Ramírez		0	0	(Salvadoran Football Federation)
20		Carlos Contreras		0	0	(Salvadoran Football Federation)
21		Pedro Antonio Vázquez		0	0	(Salvadoran Football Federation)

== Guatemala ==
Head coach: Alfredo Cuevas

No.	Pos.	Player	Date of birth (age)	Caps	Goals	Club
1	GK	José Alfonso Vettorazzi		0	0	(National Football Federation of Guatemala)
2	GK	Ernesto Berger		0	0	(National Football Federation of Guatemala)
3		Rafael Maldonado		0	0	(National Football Federation of Guatemala)
4		Esteban "Mudo" González		0	0	(National Football Federation of Guatemala)
5		Ramón "Moncho" Rodríguez		0	0	(National Football Federation of Guatemala)
6		Oscar Ramos		0	0	(National Football Federation of Guatemala)
7	DF	Julio Ramírez		4	0	(National Football Federation of Guatemala)
8		Ramiro Suárez		0	0	(National Football Federation of Guatemala)
9	DF	Rafael Véliz		1	0	(National Football Federation of Guatemala)
10	FW	Guillermo Enrique Rodríguez		3	0	(National Football Federation of Guatemala)
11		Minor Sigui		0	0	(National Football Federation of Guatemala)
12	MF	Joaquín Ortiz Díaz		16	0	(National Football Federation of Guatemala)
13	FW	Fredy Masella	5 December 1935 (aged 19)	0	0	(National Football Federation of Guatemala) Comunicaciones
14		Juan José Cordero		0	0	(National Football Federation of Guatemala) Municipal
15	MF	Eduardo de León	30 October 1933 (aged 21)	0	0	(National Football Federation of Guatemala) Tipografía Nacional
16		Lizardo Ruano	1 June 1936 (aged 19)	0	0	(National Football Federation of Guatemala) Tipografía Nacional
17	FW	Jorge Vickers	15 October 1930 (aged 24)	4	0	(National Football Federation of Guatemala) Comunicaciones
18		Roberto Calderón		0	0	(National Football Federation of Guatemala)
19		Roberto Pérez		0	0	(National Football Federation of Guatemala)
20		Jorge Murcia		0	0	(National Football Federation of Guatemala)
21		Carlos García		5	3	(National Football Federation of Guatemala)

== Honduras ==
Head coach: Otto Bumbel

No.	Pos.	Player	Date of birth (age)	Caps	Goals	Club
1	GK	Jorge Alberto Zavala		0	0	(National Autonomous Federation of Football of Honduras)
2	GK	Julio "Brujo" Martínez		5	0	(National Autonomous Federation of Football of Honduras)
3	GK	Efraín Salinas		1	0	(National Autonomous Federation of Football of Honduras)
4	DF	Víctor Bernárdez		5	0	(National Autonomous Federation of Football of Honduras) Motagua
5	DF	Wilfredo García		0	0	(National Autonomous Federation of Football of Honduras) Abaca
6	DF	Antonio "Toño" Rodríguez		1	0	(National Autonomous Federation of Football of Honduras)
7	DF	Jorge Alberto Solís	1 January 1935 (aged 20)	0	0	(National Autonomous Federation of Football of Honduras) Federal
8	MF	Glandstone Grant		2	0	(National Autonomous Federation of Football of Honduras) Aduana
9	MF	Ronald Leaky		4	2	(National Autonomous Federation of Football of Honduras) Aduana
10	MF	Carlos Rivera Williams		6	0	(National Autonomous Federation of Football of Honduras) Sula
11	MF	Rafael "Cava" Flores		0	0	(National Autonomous Federation of Football of Honduras)
12	MF	Manuel "Nelly" Sosa		0	0	(National Autonomous Federation of Football of Honduras) Motagua
13	MF	Arnaldo Enamorado		0	0	(National Autonomous Federation of Football of Honduras)
14	MF	Quintin Máximo		0	0	(National Autonomous Federation of Football of Honduras)
15	FW	Jacobo Godoy		0	0	(National Autonomous Federation of Football of Honduras) Sula
16	FW	Guillermo Guerrero		0	0	(National Autonomous Federation of Football of Honduras) Sula
17	FW	Reynaldo Zelaya		5	1	(National Autonomous Federation of Football of Honduras) Sula
18	FW	Melvin Prince		0	0	(National Autonomous Federation of Football of Honduras) Aduana
19	FW	Rodolfo Godoy	1928 (aged 26–27)	6	6	(National Autonomous Federation of Football of Honduras) Motagua
20	FW	Armando Guerra		1	0	(National Autonomous Federation of Football of Honduras)
21	FW	Roy Padilla		0	0	(National Autonomous Federation of Football of Honduras)
22	FW	Carlos Suazo	8 March 1936 (aged 19)	0	0	(National Autonomous Federation of Football of Honduras) Olimpia
