= 1953 CCCF Championship squads =

These are the squads for the countries that played in the 1953 CCCF Championship.

The age listed for each player is on 8 March 1953, the first day of the tournament. The numbers of caps and goals listed for each player do not include any matches played after the start of the tournament. The club listed is the club for which the player last played a competitive match before the tournament. The nationality for each club reflects the national association (not the league) to which the club is affiliated. A flag is included for coaches who are of a different nationality than their own national team.

== Costa Rica ==
Head coach: (Brazil) Otto Bumbel

No.	Pos.	Player	Date of birth (age)	Caps	Goals	Club
1	GK	Carlos Alvarado Villalobos	19 December 1927 (aged 25)	0	0	(Costa Rican Football Federation) Alajuelense
2	GK	Hernán Alvarado Guerrero	25 November 1932 (aged 20)	0	0	(Costa Rican Football Federation) La Libertad
3	DF	Rodolfo Sanabria	7 December 1930 (aged 22)	0	0	(Costa Rican Football Federation) Saprissa
4	DF	Mario Cordero	7 April 1930 (aged 22)	0	0	(Costa Rican Football Federation) Saprissa
5	DF	Isidro Williams	22 December 1922 (aged 30)	0	0	(Costa Rican Football Federation) Uruguay de Coronado
6	DF	Wedell Jiménez	1926 (aged 28)	0	0	(Costa Rican Football Federation) La Libertad
7	MF	Heriberto Molina		2	0	(Costa Rican Football Federation) Alajuelense
8	MF	Quico Chacón	17 January 1934 (aged 19)	0	0	(Costa Rican Football Federation) Uruguay de Coronado
9	MF	Edgar Quesada	16 August 1931 (aged 21)	3	0	(Costa Rican Football Federation) Herediano
10	MF	Elías Valenciano	4 April 1925 (aged 27)	3	0	(Costa Rican Football Federation) Saprissa
11	MF	Édgar Esquivel	27 February 1925 (aged 28)	3	1	(Costa Rican Football Federation) Herediano
12	MF	Isaac Jiménez	19 May 1918 (aged 34)	2	0	(Costa Rican Football Federation) Cartaginés
13	MF	Jorge "Curro" Roldán		0	0	(Costa Rican Football Federation) UCR
14	FW	Rodolfo Herrera González	11 August 1931 (aged 21)	0	0	(Costa Rican Football Federation) Saprissa
15	FW	Álvaro Murillo	24 November 1930 (aged 22)	0	0	(Costa Rican Football Federation) Saprissa
16	FW	Alexis Goñi Fonesca	11 June 1933 (aged 19)	0	0	(Costa Rican Football Federation) Cartaginés
17	FW	Mon Rodríguez	5 November 1928 (aged 24)	0	0	(Costa Rican Football Federation) Orión
18	FW	Miguel Ángel Zeledón		0	0	(Costa Rican Football Federation) Orión
19	FW	Carlos Láscarez	17 April 1931 (aged 21)	0	0	(Costa Rican Football Federation) Saprissa
20	FW	Édgar Murillo	6 September 1920 (aged 30)	1	0	(Costa Rican Football Federation) Herediano
21	FW	Fernando Solano		9	8	(Costa Rican Football Federation) Alajuelense
22	FW	Luciano Campos	25 February 1923 (aged 30)	6	4	(Costa Rican Football Federation) Herediano

== El Salvador ==
Head coach: Marcelo Estrada

No.	Pos.	Player	Date of birth (age)	Caps	Goals	Club
1	GK	José Manuel Garay	28 November 1925 (aged 27)	0	0	(Salvadoran Football Federation) Marte
2	GK	Humberto Pérez García		0	0	(Salvadoran Football Federation) FAS
3	GK	Yohalmo Aurora		0	0	(Salvadoran Football Federation)
4	DF	Víctor Hugo Moreno		0	0	(Salvadoran Football Federation)
5	DF	José Manuel Deras		11	1	(Salvadoran Football Federation)
6	DF	José Hernández		0	0	(Salvadoran Football Federation)
7	DF	Isaías Choto	16 December 1921 (aged 31)	7	0	(Salvadoran Football Federation) Marte
8	MF	Conrado Miranda	14 October 1928 (aged 24)	3	0	(Salvadoran Football Federation) Marte
9	MF	Rafael Guzmán		0	0	(Salvadoran Football Federation) FAS
10	MF	Armando Limongi		0	0	(Salvadoran Football Federation) FAS
11	MF	Luis Antonio Regalado	1 October 1922 (aged 30)	14	1	(Salvadoran Football Federation) Luis Ángel Firpo
12	MF	Domingo Flores		0	0	(Salvadoran Football Federation)
13	MF	Antonio Azucena		0	0	(Salvadoran Football Federation)
14	MF	Fernando Barrios		0	0	(Salvadoran Football Federation)
15	MF	Rodolfo Molina		0	0	(Salvadoran Football Federation)
16	MF	Ramón Chávez		0	0	(Salvadoran Football Federation)
17	FW	Ricardo Valencia	5 October 1926 (aged 26)	0	0	(Salvadoran Football Federation) FAS
18	FW	Eduardo Pineda	31 October 1931 (aged 21)	0	0	(Salvadoran Football Federation) FAS
19	FW	Mario Montoya	30 August 1930 (aged 22)	0	0	(Salvadoran Football Federation) Juventud Olímpica
20	FW	Juan Francisco Barraza	12 March 1935 (aged 17)	0	0	(Salvadoran Football Federation) Dragón
21	FW	José Armando Rivas		0	0	(Salvadoran Football Federation)
22	FW	Raúl Julio Mejía		0	0	(Salvadoran Football Federation)

== Guatemala ==
Head coach: Juan Francisco Aguirre

No.	Pos.	Player	Date of birth (age)	Caps	Goals	Club
1	GK	José Pedro Segura		8	0	(National Football Federation of Guatemala) Tipografía Nacional
2	GK	Gabriel Urriola	1 January 1930 (aged 23)	0	0	(National Football Federation of Guatemala) Municipal
3	GK	Salvador Marroquín		2	0	(National Football Federation of Guatemala) IRCA
4	DF	Federico Augusto Morales		10	0	(National Football Federation of Guatemala) Comunicaciones
5	DF	Romeo Díaz		0	0	(National Football Federation of Guatemala) Comunicaciones
6	DF	Pedro Otto Cabrera		0	0	(National Football Federation of Guatemala) Municipal
7	DF	Julio Ramírez		0	0	(National Football Federation of Guatemala) Comunicaciones
8	DF	Rafael Veliz		0	0	(National Football Federation of Guatemala) Municipal
9	DF	José Álvaro Mirón		4	0	(National Football Federation of Guatemala)
10	DF	Federico Castro		0	0	(National Football Federation of Guatemala)
11	MF	Luis Alberto González		6	0	(National Football Federation of Guatemala) Comunicaciones
12	MF	Carlos Osorio		1	0	(National Football Federation of Guatemala)
13	MF	Ricardo Ortiz		0	0	(National Football Federation of Guatemala)
14	MF	Joaquín Ortiz Díaz		10	0	(National Football Federation of Guatemala)
15	FW	Pepino Toledo	10 August 1919 (aged 33)	17	15	(National Football Federation of Guatemala) Municipal
16	FW	Jorge Vickers		0	0	(National Football Federation of Guatemala) Municipal
17	FW	Enrique "Gigante" Rodríguez		0	0	(National Football Federation of Guatemala) Comunicaciones
18	FW	Augusto Espinoza	6 December 1930 (aged 22)	0	0	(National Football Federation of Guatemala) Comunicaciones
19	FW	Efraín de León		7	2	(National Football Federation of Guatemala) Municipal
20	FW	Haroldo Estrada		0	0	(National Football Federation of Guatemala)
21	FW	Manuel Andrade		0	0	(National Football Federation of Guatemala)
22	FW	Carlos García		0	0	(National Football Federation of Guatemala)

== Honduras ==
Head Coach: Lurio Martínez

No.	Pos.	Player	Date of birth (age)	Caps	Goals	Club
	GK	Julio "Brujo" Martínez		0	0	(National Autonomous Federation of Football of Honduras) Hibueras
	GK	Efraín "Gato" Salinas		0	0	(National Autonomous Federation of Football of Honduras) Federal
	GK	Luis Alonso Reyes		0	0	(National Autonomous Federation of Football of Honduras) Sula
	DF	Víctor "Motor" Bernárdez		0	0	(National Autonomous Federation of Football of Honduras) Motagua
	DF	Armando Manuel Sosa		2	1	(National Autonomous Federation of Football of Honduras) Hibueras
	DF	Arturo "Picho Pacho" Rodríguez		0	0	(National Autonomous Federation of Football of Honduras) Sula
	MF	Ireneo Solano		0	0	(National Autonomous Federation of Football of Honduras) Aduana Deportivo
	MF	Héctor "Pacheco" Molina		0	0	(National Autonomous Federation of Football of Honduras) Federal
	MF	Jacobo Godoy Ramírez		0	0	(National Autonomous Federation of Football of Honduras) Federal
	MF	Carlos Rivera Williams		0	0	(National Autonomous Federation of Football of Honduras) Federal
	MF	Manuel Larios		0	0	(National Autonomous Federation of Football of Honduras) Hibueras
	MF	Abraham Pavón		0	0	(National Autonomous Federation of Football of Honduras) Hibueras
	MF	Gladstone Grant		0	0	(National Autonomous Federation of Football of Honduras) Aduana Deportivo
	MF	Ronald Leaky		0	0	(National Autonomous Federation of Football of Honduras) Aduana Deportivo
	MF	Salvador "Curuzo" Cruz		0	0	(National Autonomous Federation of Football of Honduras) Sula
	FW	Rodolfo Godoy	1928 (aged 24–25)	0	0	(National Autonomous Federation of Football of Honduras) Motagua
	FW	Reynaldo Zeyala		0	0	(National Autonomous Federation of Football of Honduras) Aduana Deportivo
	FW	Rudy Padilla		0	0	(National Autonomous Federation of Football of Honduras) Hibueras
	FW	Antonio "Toño" Rodríguez		0	0	(National Autonomous Federation of Football of Honduras) Hibueras
	FW	Pedro "Peyito" Velásquez		0	0	(National Autonomous Federation of Football of Honduras) Federal
	FW	Rolando Butel		0	0	(National Autonomous Federation of Football of Honduras) Hibueras
	FW	Armando Guerra		0	0	(National Autonomous Federation of Football of Honduras) Hibueras

== Netherlands Antilles ==
Head coach: Antoine J. Maduro

No.	Pos.	Player	Date of birth (age)	Caps	Goals	Club
1	GK	Marco Efraim Tromp	18 June 1929 (aged 23)	0	0	(Netherlands Antillean Football Union) Aruba Juniors
2	GK	Lucas Hernández	17 October 1930 (aged 22)	0	0	(Netherlands Antillean Football Union) Aruba Juniors
3	GK	Frank Paulina		0	0	(Netherlands Antillean Football Union) Jong Holland
4	DF	Wilhelm Canword	11 July 1933 (aged 19)	1	0	(Netherlands Antillean Football Union) SUBT
5	DF	Wilfred de Lanoi	12 February 1929 (aged 24)	1	0	(Netherlands Antillean Football Union) Jong Holland
6	DF	Pedro Matrona	9 December 1927 (aged 25)	7	0	(Netherlands Antillean Football Union) Jong Holland
7	DF	Raymundo Kemp	31 October 1922 (aged 30)	0	0	(Netherlands Antillean Football Union) Aruba Juniors
8	MF	Siméon Molina	18 February 1932 (aged 21)	0	0	(Netherlands Antillean Football Union) Aruba Juniors
9	MF	Guillermo Giribaldi	17 May 1929 (aged 23)	9	0	(Netherlands Antillean Football Union) Sithoc
10	MF	Edmundo Vlinder	9 February 1926 (aged 27)	9	0	(Netherlands Antillean Football Union) SUBT
11	MF	Ricardo Helder	30 October 1927 (aged 25)	0	0	(Netherlands Antillean Football Union) Racing Aruba
12	MF	Moises Bicentini		0	0	(Netherlands Antillean Football Union) SUBT
13	MF	Gabriel Arcangel Kelly		0	0	(Netherlands Antillean Football Union) Racing Aruba
14	MF	Wilfred Korps		0	0	(Netherlands Antillean Football Union) SUBT
15	GK	Ergilio Hato	7 November 1925 (aged 27)	8	0	(Netherlands Antillean Football Union) Jong Holland
16	MF	Juan Briezen	9 August 1928 (aged 24)	1	1	(Netherlands Antillean Football Union) Aruba Juniors
17	FW	Guillermo Krips	22 October 1928 (aged 24)	6	1	(Netherlands Antillean Football Union) Sithoc
18	FW	Adriaan Brokke	20 December 1928 (aged 24)	1	0	(Netherlands Antillean Football Union) Racing Aruba
19	FW	Julio Jansen		0	0	(Netherlands Antillean Football Union) Racing Aruba
20	FW	Bernard Hoftijzer	20 August 1927 (aged 25)	0	0	(Netherlands Antillean Football Union) Aruba Juniors
21	FW	Hubert Schoop		0	0	(Netherlands Antillean Football Union) Sithoc
22	FW	Francisco Romualdo Gómez	4 October 1933 (aged 19)	0	0	(Netherlands Antillean Football Union) SUBT

== Nicaragua ==
Head coach: (Costa Rica) Santiago Bonilla

No.	Pos.	Player	Date of birth (age)	Caps	Goals	Club
	GK	Fernando Somarriba	23 September 1933 (aged 19)	0	0	(Nicaraguan Football Federation) Instituto Pedagógico
	GK	Wilfredo Gaitán		1	0	(Nicaraguan Football Federation)
	GK	Alfredo Artiles	14 July 1931 (aged 21)	0	0	(Nicaraguan Football Federation) La Salle
	DF	Rosendo Díaz	12 November 1931 (aged 21)	3	0	(Nicaraguan Football Federation) Aduana
	DF	Hugo Navarrete		0	0	(Nicaraguan Football Federation)
	DF	Jaime Jorge Williams		0	0	(Nicaraguan Football Federation)
	DF	Tulio Bendaña		0	0	(Nicaraguan Football Federation)
	MF	Ernesto Mendoza		3	0	(Nicaraguan Football Federation) La Salle
	MF	Óscar Orozco		0	0	(Nicaraguan Football Federation)
	MF	Douglas Pérez		0	0	(Nicaraguan Football Federation)
	MF	Juan Manuel Mayorga		0	0	(Nicaraguan Football Federation)
	MF	Alberto Olivares		1	0	(Nicaraguan Football Federation) La Salle
	MF	Isidro Obando		0	0	(Nicaraguan Football Federation) La Salle
	MF	Wilfredo Estrada		0	0	(Nicaraguan Football Federation)
	FW	Livio Bendaña Espinoza	22 December 1935 (aged 17)	0	0	(Nicaraguan Football Federation) Diriangén
	FW	Julio "Negro" Rocha		0	0	(Nicaraguan Football Federation)
	FW	Napoleón Molina		1	0	(Nicaraguan Football Federation)
	FW	Edgar A. Morales		1	0	(Nicaraguan Football Federation) La Salle
	FW	Luis Cifuentes		2	0	(Nicaraguan Football Federation) La Salle
	FW	Horacio Cordero	10 April 1930 (aged 22)	3	1	(Nicaraguan Football Federation) Somoza
	FW	Rolando Urbina		0	0	(Nicaraguan Football Federation)
	FW	Jose María Falla		0	0	(Nicaraguan Football Federation) La Salle

== Panama ==
Head coach: Temístocles Molina

No.	Pos.	Player	Date of birth (age)	Caps	Goals	Club
	GK	Pedro Pablo Arozemena		0	0	(Panamanian Football Federation)
	GK	Everardo Lasso		4	0	(Panamanian Football Federation) Ancón
	GK	Gerardo Federico Warren		13	0	(Panamanian Football Federation) Hispano
	GK	Alfonso Castro		0	0	(Panamanian Football Federation)
	DF	Manuel Figueroa		8	1	(Panamanian Football Federation)
	DF	Carlos Lanús Pérez		5	0	(Panamanian Football Federation) Ibérico
	DF	Rubén Kelson		0	0	(Panamanian Football Federation) Hispano
	MF	Alfredo Sandiford		14	0	(Panamanian Football Federation) Hispano
	DF	Adolfo Díaz Gáez	20 May 1930 (aged 22)	0	0	(Panamanian Football Federation)
	MF	Miguel Ángel Gascón		1	0	(Panamanian Football Federation) Ibérico
	FW	Juan Abad		0	0	(Panamanian Football Federation)
	FW	Francisco "Chino" Ponce		0	0	(Panamanian Football Federation)
	FW	Apolonio Lombardo	26 January 1934 (aged 19)	0	0	(Panamanian Football Federation)
	FW	Luis Carlos Ponce	22 August 1932 (aged 20)	0	0	(Panamanian Football Federation) Ibérico
	FW	Roberto Linares		5	1	(Panamanian Football Federation) Amador
	FW	Horacio Rangel		8	1	(Panamanian Football Federation) Huracán
	FW	José Félix de Bello		9	2	(Panamanian Football Federation) Ibérico
	FW	Luis Carlos Lemus		1	0	(Panamanian Football Federation) Huracán
	FW	Owen Delgado		0	0	(Panamanian Football Federation)
	FW	Elías Mendoza		0	0	(Panamanian Football Federation)
	FW	José Arrauz		0	0	(Panamanian Football Federation)
