= Football at the 1955 Pan American Games – Men's team squads =

The football tournament at the 1955 Pan American Games was an international football tournament in Mexico from 13 March to 22 March 1955. The age listed for each player is on 13 March, the first day of the tournament. The numbers of caps and goals listed for each player do not include any matches played after the start of the tournament. The club listed is the club for which the player last played a competitive match before the tournament. The nationality for each club reflects the national association (not the league) to which the club is affiliated. A flag is included for coaches who are of a different nationality than their own national team.:

Venezuela had a single player represent a foreign club.

== Argentina ==
Head Coach: Guillermo Stábile

No.	Pos.	Player	Date of birth (age)	Caps	Goals	Club
1	GK	Leonardo Bevilacqua	1935 (aged 19–20)	0	0	(Argentine Football Association) Boca Juniors
2	DF	Norberto Anido	9 February 1933 (aged 22)			(Argentine Football Association) Racing Club
3	DF	Manuel Oscar Castillo	3 August 1935 (aged 19)			(Argentine Football Association) Central Norte
4	MF	Juan Carlos Malazzo	22 March 1936 (aged 18)			(Argentine Football Association) River Plate
5	DF	Óscar Claria	17 July 1933 (aged 21)			(Argentine Football Association) Paraná
6	MF	Ricardo Pegnotti	22 June 1934 (aged 20)			(Argentine Football Association) Chacarita Juniors
7	FW	Ricardo Scialino	17 April 1933 (aged 21)			(Argentine Football Association) Estudiantes Eva Perón
8	FW	Héctor Molina	8 November 1935 (aged 19)			(Argentine Football Association) Estudiantes Eva Perón
9	FW	Norberto Menéndez	14 December 1936 (aged 18)			(Argentine Football Association) River Plate
10	FW	José Sanfilippo	4 May 1935 (aged 19)			(Argentine Football Association) San Lorenzo
11	FW	José Yudica	26 February 1936 (aged 19)			(Argentine Football Association) Newell's Old Boys
12	FW	Antonio Pérsico	13 October 1933 (aged 21)			(Argentine Football Association) Boca Juniors
13	FW	Ricardo Campana	1935 (aged 19–20)			(Argentine Football Association) Ferro Carril Oeste
14	FW	Humberto Maschio	20 February 1937 (aged 18)			(Argentine Football Association) Racing Club
15	DF	Juan Jesús Moreno				(Argentine Football Association) Ferro Carril Oeste
16	GK	Oscar Stortini				(Argentine Football Association) Chacarita Juniors
17	MF	Julio Alberto Nuín	29 November 1937 (aged 17)			(Argentine Football Association) River Plate
18	MF	Tomás Anglese				(Argentine Football Association) Independiente

== Mexico ==
Head coach: (Spain) Antonio Álvarez

No.	Pos.	Player	Date of birth (age)	Caps	Goals	Club
1	GK	José Luis Sánchez				(Mexican Football Federation) Tolteca
2	DF	Primitivo Carrillo				(Mexican Football Federation) Guadalajara
3	DF	Jorge Rodríguez Navarro	4 April 1925 (aged 29)			(Mexican Football Federation) Occidente
4	DF	Eduardo Colmenero				(Mexican Football Federation) Necaxa
5	MF	Juan Arrieta Gómez				(Mexican Football Federation) América
6	FW	Francisco Pérez				(Mexican Football Federation) Oro
7	FW	Arturo Vargas Hidalgo				(Mexican Football Federation) Santa Fe
8	FW	Agustín Díaz Rojas	16 October 1935 (aged 19)			(Mexican Football Federation) Zacatepec
9	FW	Francisco Noriega	8 September 1935 (aged 19)			(Mexican Football Federation) Necaxa
10	FW	Ramón Sigifredo Mercado	31 August 1933 (aged 21)			(Mexican Football Federation) Atlas
11	FW	Felipe Negrete				(Mexican Football Federation) Irapuato
12	DF	Agustín Díaz Rojas	2 September 1935 (aged 19)			(Mexican Football Federation) Necaxa
13	FW	Víctor Nava				(Mexican Football Federation) América
14	FW	Fernando López Pastrana				(Mexican Football Federation) Zacatepec
15	MF	Alfonso González Fernández				(Mexican Football Federation) Tecnológico de Monterrey
16	MF	Joaquín Fierro				(Mexican Football Federation) Necaxa
17	GK	Elías Vázquez				(Mexican Football Federation) SUTAJ
18	MF	Gustavo Ríos Salazar				(Mexican Football Federation)
19	FW	Ramón Martínez López				(Mexican Football Federation) Atlante
20	FW	Alfredo Hernández	18 June 1935 (aged 19)			(Mexican Football Federation) Aguiluchos
21	FW	Héctor Segura Martínez				(Mexican Football Federation) Atlante
22	DF	Gonzalo Guerrero Albarrán				(Mexican Football Federation) Irapuato

== Netherlands Antilles ==
Head coach: Pedro Celestino da Cunha

No.	Pos.	Player	Date of birth (age)	Caps	Goals	Club
1	GK	Ergilio Hato	7 November 1925 (aged 29)			(Netherlands Antillean Football Union) Jong Holland
2	DF	Pedro Matrona	9 December 1927 (aged 27)			(Netherlands Antillean Football Union) Jong Holland
3	DF	Wilfred de Lanoi	12 February 1929 (aged 26)			(Netherlands Antillean Football Union) Jong Holland
4	MF	Moises Bicentini	27 December 1931 (aged 23)			(Netherlands Antillean Football Union) SUBT
5	MF	Ludgero Adoptie				(Netherlands Antillean Football Union) Jong Holland
6	MF	Guillermo Giribaldi	17 May 1929 (aged 25)			(Netherlands Antillean Football Union) Sithoc
7	MF	Willys Heyliger	9 January 1926 (aged 29)			(Netherlands Antillean Football Union) SUBT
8	FW	Ronald de Lanoi				(Netherlands Antillean Football Union) Sithoc
9	FW	Hubert Schoop				(Netherlands Antillean Football Union) Jong Holland
10	FW	Eustaquio Bernardina				(Netherlands Antillean Football Union) Jong Holland
11	FW	Julio Jansen	20 December 1928 (aged 26)			(Netherlands Antillean Football Union) Racing Club Aruba
12	DF	Wilhelm Canword	11 July 1933 (aged 21)			(Netherlands Antillean Football Union) SUBT
13	MF	Edmundo Vlinder	6 February 1926 (aged 29)			(Netherlands Antillean Football Union) SUBT
14	MF	Luis Antonio Brion				(Netherlands Antillean Football Union) Aruba Juniors
15	DF	Raymundo Kemp	31 October 1922 (aged 32)			(Netherlands Antillean Football Union) Aruba Juniors
16	FW	Francisco Romualdo Gómez				(Netherlands Antillean Football Union) SUBT
17	GK	Marco Tromp	18 June 1929 (aged 25)			(Netherlands Antillean Football Union) Aruba Juniors
18	MF	Pedro Koolman	19 May 1933 (aged 21)			(Netherlands Antillean Football Union) SUBT
19	DF	Joy La Rosa	25 October 1933 (aged 21)	0	0	(Netherlands Antillean Football Union) Aruba Juniors
20	GK	Antonio Klabber				(Netherlands Antillean Football Union) Jong Colombia
21	FW	Rogelio Hoek				(Netherlands Antillean Football Union) Sithoc
22	FW	Erno Jansen				(Netherlands Antillean Football Union) Jong Holland

== Venezuela ==
Head Coach: (Brazil) Orlando Fantoni

No.	Pos.	Player	Date of birth (age)	Caps	Goals	Club
1	GK	Franklyn Franklin				(Venezuelan Football Federation) Dos Caminos
2	DF	Gastón Vera				(Venezuelan Football Federation) Loyola
3	DF	Carlos Medina McLeod				(Royal Spanish Football Federation) Universitario de Mérida
4	MF	Joseba Lascurain				(Venezuelan Football Federation) Loyola
5	MF	Heriberto Heredia				(Venezuelan Football Federation) Banco Obrero
6	FW	Agustín Matson				(Venezuelan Football Federation) Dos Caminos
7	MF	Rafael Antonio González				(Venezuelan Football Federation) Dos Caminos
8	FW	Aniello Alterio	16 January 1931 (aged 24)			(Venezuelan Football Federation) Deportivo Italiano
9	FW	René Irazque				(Venezuelan Football Federation) Dos Caminos
10	FW	Aniello Alterio	16 January 1931 (aged 24)			(Venezuelan Football Federation) Deportivo Italiano
11	FW	Gastón Monterola				(Venezuelan Football Federation) Loyola
12	FW	Antonio Carlos Rodríguez	16 January 1931 (aged 24)			(Venezuelan Football Federation) Loyola
13	GK	Alberto Delgado Gattochotegui				(Venezuelan Football Federation) Banco Obrero
14	MF	Pedro Díaz Gabino				(Venezuelan Football Federation) Dos Caminos
15	DF	Manuel Guaramato				(Venezuelan Football Federation) San Bernardino
16	MF	José Oswaldo Martínez				(Venezuelan Football Federation) San Bernardino
17	FW	Jesús María Landez				(Venezuelan Football Federation) San Loyola
18	FW	Ildemaro Ramos				Free agent
19	FW	Pedro José Ceballos				Free agent
20	FW	Orlando Fantoni	4 May 1917 (aged 38)			No club
