= 1948 CCCF Championship squads =

Squads for the 1948 CCCF Championship

These are the squads for the countries that played in the 1948 CCCF Championship.

The age listed for each player is on 29 February 1948, the first day of the tournament. The numbers of caps and goals listed for each player do not include any matches played after the start of the tournament. The club listed is the club for which the player last played a competitive match before the tournament. The nationality for each club reflects the national association (not the league) to which the club is affiliated. A flag is included for coaches who are of a different nationality than their own national team.

== Costa Rica ==
Head coach: Hernán Bolaños

No.	Pos.	Player	Date of birth (age)	Caps	Goals	Club
1	GK	Manuel Cantillo		0	0	(Costa Rican Football Federation) La Libertad
2	GK	Rafael Ángel Cardona		2	0	(Costa Rican Football Federation) UCR
3	DF	León Alvarado	30 March 1925 (aged 22)	0	0	(Costa Rican Football Federation) Herediano
4	DF	Mario Masís		3	0	(Costa Rican Football Federation) La Libertad
5	DF	Juan Manuel Chavarría		0	0	(Costa Rican Football Federation) Alajuelense
6	MF	Mario Ruiz		3	0	(Costa Rican Football Federation) UCR
7	MF	Heliodoro Vargas		0	0	(Costa Rican Football Federation) Herediano
8	MF	Eduardo Cabalceta		9	0	(Costa Rican Football Federation) UCR
9	MF	Carlos Garita		4	0	(Costa Rican Football Federation) UCR
10	MF	Édgar Esquivel	25 February 1925 (aged 23)	0	0	(Costa Rican Football Federation) UCR
11	MF	Ubaldo Chaves		0	0	(Costa Rican Football Federation) Gimnástica Española
12	FW	Alberto Armijo	27 September 1926 (aged 21)	0	0	(Costa Rican Football Federation) UCR
13	FW	José Manuel Retana		1	0	(Costa Rican Football Federation) Alajuelense
14	FW	Manuel Vargas		0	0	(Costa Rican Football Federation) Herediano
15	FW	Fernando Solano		2	4	(Costa Rican Football Federation) UCR
16	FW	Jaime Meza	6 January 1926 (aged 22)	0	0	(Costa Rican Football Federation) Cartaginés
17	FW	Eladio Esquivel	15 March 1926 (aged 21)	0	0	(Costa Rican Football Federation) Herediano
18	FW	Jorge Quesada	11 September 1915 (aged 32)	0	0	(Costa Rican Football Federation) Orión
19	FW	Luciano Campos	23 February 1923 (aged 25)	0	0	(Costa Rican Football Federation) Herediano
20	FW	Luis Leonel Boza		0	0	(Costa Rican Football Federation) Orión

== Curaçao ==
Head Coach: None

No.	Pos.	Player	Date of birth (age)	Caps	Goals	Club
	GK	Ergilio Hato	7 November 1926 (aged 21)	0	0	(Curaçao Football Federation) Jong Holland
	GK	Ezequiel Vos		3	0	(Curaçao Football Federation) Jong Holland
	DF	Wilfred de Lanoi	12 February 1929 (aged 19)	0	0	(Curaçao Football Federation) Jong Holland
	DF	Pedro Matrona	9 December 1927 (aged 20)	0	0	(Curaçao Football Federation) Jong Holland
	DF	Jossy Pietersz		0	0	(Curaçao Football Federation) SUBT
	DF	Romoldo Mercera		0	0	(Curaçao Football Federation) SUBT
	MF	Edmundo Confesor		3	0	(Curaçao Football Federation) SUBT
	MF	Edmundo Vlinder	9 February 1926 (aged 22)	0	0	(Curaçao Football Federation) SUBT
	MF	Guillermo Giribaldi	17 May 1929 (aged 18)	0	0	(Curaçao Football Federation) Jong Curaçao
	MF	Cornelius de Geus		0	0	(Curaçao Football Federation) Jong Curaçao
	MF	Federico Jansen		0	0	(Curaçao Football Federation) SUBT
	MF	Alex Pietersz		0	0	(Curaçao Football Federation) SUBT
	FW	Guillermo Krips	28 November 1929 (aged 18)	0	0	(Curaçao Football Federation) Sithoc
	FW	Willys Heyliger	9 January 1926 (aged 22)	0	0	(Curaçao Football Federation) SUBT
	FW	Petrus Conquet		0	0	(Curaçao Football Federation) Sithoc
	FW	Reinaldo Bernabela		0	0	(Curaçao Football Federation) SUBT
	FW	C. Isebia		0	0	(Curaçao Football Federation) Jong Curaçao
	FW	Charles Haseth		0	0	(Curaçao Football Federation) RKSV Vitesse
	FW	Pedro Coffie		0	0	(Curaçao Football Federation) RKSV Vitesse
	FW	Carlos Boye		0	0	(Curaçao Football Federation) Jong Holland

== El Salvador ==
Head coach: Américo González

No.	Pos.	Player	Date of birth (age)	Caps	Goals	Club
1	GK	Ovidio López		0	0	(Salvadoran Football Federation)
2	GK	Manuel Gómez		3	0	(Salvadoran Football Federation)
3	DF	Gonzalo Palacios		3	0	(Salvadoran Football Federation)
3	DF	Manuel Umaña		0	0	(Salvadoran Football Federation) Luis Ángel Firpo
4	DF	Francisco Bolaños		0	0	(Salvadoran Football Federation) Luis Ángel Firpo
5	DF	Isaías Choto		0	0	(Salvadoran Football Federation) Luis Ángel Firpo
6	DF	Freddy Maida		3	0	(Salvadoran Football Federation) Juventud Olímpica
7	DF	José Manuel Deras		5	1	(Salvadoran Football Federation)
8	MF	Conrado Miranda	14 October 1928 (aged 17)	0	0	(Salvadoran Football Federation) Marte Quezaltepeque
9	MF	Luis Antonio Regalado	1 October 1922 (aged 23)	9	1	(Salvadoran Football Federation) Luis Ángel Firpo
10	MF	Miguel Ezequiel Campos		7	0	(Salvadoran Football Federation) Luis Ángel Firpo
11	MF	Salvador Zepeda		0	0	(Salvadoran Football Federation) Luis Ángel Firpo
12	MF	Ricardo Monterrosa		8	2	(Salvadoran Football Federation)
13	MF	Julián Linares		6	0	(Salvadoran Football Federation) Juventud Olímpica
14	MF	Miguel Rivas		7	7	(Salvadoran Football Federation)
15	FW	Ricardo Barrios		0	0	(Salvadoran Football Federation)
16	FW	Luis Alonso Torres		4	1	(Salvadoran Football Federation) Luis Ángel Firpo
17	FW	Luis Ruano		0	0	(Salvadoran Football Federation)
18	FW	Héctor Canales		5	0	(Salvadoran Football Federation)
19	FW	Roberto Palacios		0	0	(Salvadoran Football Federation)
20	FW	Rafael Julio Corado		8	7	(Salvadoran Football Federation)
21	FW	Ricardo Morataya		0	0	(Salvadoran Football Federation)
22	FW	Abraham Jiménez		0	0	(Salvadoran Football Federation)

== Guatemala ==
Head coach: (Argentina) Juan Carlos Cevasco

No.	Pos.	Player	Date of birth (age)	Caps	Goals	Club
1	GK	José Pedro Segura		0	0	(National Football Federation of Guatemala) Municipal
2	GK	Salvador Marroquín		0	0	(National Football Federation of Guatemala) IRCA
3	DF	Federico Augusto Morales		4	0	(National Football Federation of Guatemala) Municipal
4	DF	José Guillermo Echeverría		0	0	(National Football Federation of Guatemala)
5	DF	José Álvaro Mirón		4	0	(National Football Federation of Guatemala)
6	MF	Augusto Sandoval		0	0	(National Football Federation of Guatemala) Municipal
7	MF	Guillermo Marroquín		8	0	(National Football Federation of Guatemala) Municipal
8	MF	Luis Alberto González		0	0	(National Football Federation of Guatemala) Comunicaciones
8	MF	Alfredo Castellanos		7	0	(National Football Federation of Guatemala)
9	MF	Carlos Enrique Rodas		1	0	(National Football Federation of Guatemala)
10	MF	Carlos Osorio		0	0	(National Football Federation of Guatemala)
11	FW	Mario Camposeco	6 August 1921 (aged 26)	10	4	(National Football Federation of Guatemala) Municipal
12	FW	Pepino Toledo	10 August 1919 (aged 28)	10	12	(National Football Federation of Guatemala) Municipal
13	FW	Juan Francisco Aguirre		1	0	(National Football Federation of Guatemala) Hércules
14	FW	Julio Armando Durán		1	1	(National Football Federation of Guatemala) Municipal
15	FW	Efraín de León		5	2	(National Football Federation of Guatemala) Municipal
16	FW	Esteban “Ñeco” González		6	0	(National Football Federation of Guatemala) Municipal
17	FW	Antonio Galán		0	0	(National Football Federation of Guatemala)
18	FW	Rubén Aqueche		0	0	(National Football Federation of Guatemala)
19	FW	Alfonso Ortega		0	0	(National Football Federation of Guatemala)

== Panama ==
Head coach: Óscar Rendoll Gómez

No.	Pos.	Player	Date of birth (age)	Caps	Goals	Club
	GK	Gerardo Federico Warren		0	0	(Panamanian Football Federation) Avión
	GK	Everardo Lasso		0	0	(Panamanian Football Federation)
	DF	Reinaldo Antonio Carrillo		3	0	(Panamanian Football Federation) Avión
	DF	Gastón de León		0	0	(Panamanian Football Federation) Avión
	DF	Félix Tejada		6	0	(Panamanian Football Federation) Avión
	DF	Antonio Latiff		3	0	(Panamanian Football Federation)
	MF	Francisco Ponce		0	0	(Panamanian Football Federation) Avión
	DF	Roberto Pinnock		0	0	(Panamanian Football Federation) Avión
	MF	José Eduardo Pinnock		2	0	(Panamanian Football Federation) Avión
	MF	Alfredo Sandiford		0	0	(Panamanian Football Federation) América
	FW	James Santiago Anderson	14 July 1916 (aged 31)	4	2	(Panamanian Football Federation) Avión
	FW	Leslie McLeary		0	0	(Panamanian Football Federation) Avión
	FW	Alfonso Frazer		0	0	(Panamanian Football Federation)
	FW	José Félix de Bello		0	0	(Panamanian Football Federation)
	FW	Luis Carlos Valdés		4	1	(Panamanian Football Federation) Deportivo 19
	FW	Antonio Morales		5	1	(Panamanian Football Federation) Celen
	FW	Luis Carlos Rangel		7	8	(Panamanian Football Federation) Deportivo Colón
	FW	Antoine Neville		0	0	(Panamanian Football Federation)
	FW	Pablo Emilio Prado		3	0	(Panamanian Football Federation)
	FW	Carlos Sarmales		0	0	(Panamanian Football Federation)
