= Football at the 1955 Pan American Games =

Football – Men's tournament at the 1955 Pan American Games
- Venue: Estadio Olímpico Universitario
- Dates: 13–22 March

Medalists
Gold medal	Argentina
Silver medal	Mexico
Bronze medal	Netherlands Antilles

The second edition of the football tournament at the Pan American Games was held in Mexico City, Mexico, from 13 March to 22 March 1955. Four teams competed, with Argentina defending the title.

Argentina won its second consecutive gold medal after totalising 11 points in 6 matches. Estadio Olímpico Universitario was the venue for all the games.

== Participants ==
- Argentina
- Mexico
- Netherlands Antilles
- Venezuela

== Final table ==
Team	Pts	Pld	W	D	L	GF	GA	GD
Argentina	11	6	5	1	0	23	7	+16
Mexico	5	6	1	3	2	10	13	−3
Netherlands Antilles	4	6	2	0	4	11	13	−2
Venezuela	4	6	1	2	3	9	20	−11

== Matches ==
13 March

Netherlands Antilles	1–2	Argentina
de Lannoy 7'	Report	Sanfilippo 11'; Yudica 22'

Estadio Olímpico Universitario, Mexico City
Referee: Prudencio Garcia (United States)

13 March

Mexico	1–1	Venezuela
Mercado 15'	Report	Monterola 60'

Estadio Olímpico Universitario, Mexico City
Referee: John Best (United States)

14 March

Venezuela	0–5	Argentina
	Report	Pegnotti 2', 82'; Sanfilippo 4'; Menéndez 43'; Maschio 53'

Estadio Olímpico Universitario, Mexico City
Referee: John Best (United States)

15 March

Mexico	1–0	Netherlands Antilles
Rodríguez 52' (pen.)	Report

Estadio Olímpico Universitario, Mexico City
Referee: Prudencio García (United States)

16 March

Venezuela	3–2	Netherlands Antilles
Díaz 14', 35'; Monterola 47'	Report	Schoop 4', 20'

Estadio Olímpico Universitario, Mexico City
Referee: John Best (United States)

17 March

Mexico	0–3	Argentina
	Report	Sanfilippo 46'; Claría 51'; Menéndez 68'

Estadio Olímpico Universitario, Mexico City
Referee: Prudencio García (United States)

18 March

Argentina	4–2	Netherlands Antilles
Sanfilippo 11', 16', 23'; Yudica 80'	Report	Bernardina 33' de Lannoy 46'

Estadio Olímpico Universitario, Mexico City
Referee: John Best (United States)

18 March

Mexico	3–3	Venezuela
Mercado 39', 71'; Negrete 55' (pen.)	Report	Monterola 4'; Bosco 13' (o.g.); Rodríguez 18'

Estadio Olímpico Universitario, Mexico City
Referee: Prudencio García (United States)

20 March

Argentina	6–1	Venezuela
Menéndez 4'; Sanfilippo 17', 85'; Maschio 43', 60'; Pérsico 82'	Report	Díaz 86'

Estadio Olímpico Universitario, Mexico City
Referee: John Best (United States)

20 March

Mexico	2–3	Netherlands Antilles
Noriega 15', 63'	Report	Heyliger 17'; Bicentini 55'; Kemp 85'

Estadio Olímpico Universitario, Mexico City
Referee: John Best (United States)

21 March

Venezuela	1–3	Netherlands Antilles
González 63'	Report	Bicentini 10', 19'; Schoop 24'

Estadio Olímpico Universitario, Mexico City
Referee: Prudencio Garcia (United States)

22 March

Mexico	3–3	Argentina
Mercado 15'; Martínez 42'; González 73'	Report	Maschio 17'; Molina 56'; Campana 80'

Estadio Olímpico Universitario, Mexico City
Referee: Prudencio Garcia (United States)

Team details

Mexico
Argentina

GK	1	José Luis Sánchez
DF	2	Primitivo Carrillo
DF	3	Jorge Rodríguez
MF	5	Eduardo Colmenero
MF	15	Alfonso González
MF	6	Francisco Pérez
FW	7	Arturo Vargas	(substituted off) 46'
FW	10	Sigifredo Mercado
FW	19	Ramón Martínez
FW	21	Héctor Segura
FW	14	Fernando López
Substitutes:
FW	13	Víctor Nava	(substituted on) 46'
Manager:
(Spain) Antonio Álvarez

GK	16	Oscar Stortini	(substituted off) a'
DF	15	Juan Jesús Moreno	(substituted off) b'
DF	17	Julio Nuin	(substituted off) c'
MF	3	Manuel Castillo
MF	5	Oscar Claria
MF	6	Ricardo Pegnotti
FW	7	Ricardo Scialino
FW	8	Héctor Molina	(substituted off) d'
FW	14	Humberto Maschio
FW	10	José Sanfilippo
FW	11	José Yudica
Substitutes:
GK	1	Leonardo Bevilacqua	(substituted on) a'
DF	2	Norberto Anido	(substituted on) b'
MF	4	Juan Carlos Malazzo	(substituted on) c'
FW	13	Ricardo Campana	(substituted on) d'
Manager:
(Argentina) Guillermo Stábile

1955 Pan American Games winners

Argentina
Second title

== Medalists ==
Event	Gold	Silver	Bronze
Men's football	Argentina: 1. Leonardo Bevilacqua; 2. Norberto Anido; 3. Manuel Castillo; 4. Juan C. Malazzo; 5. Oscar Clarlat; 6. Ricardo Pegnoti; 7. Ricardo Scialino; 8. Héctor Molina; 9. Norberto Menéndez; 10. José Sanfilippo; 11. José Yudica; 12. Antonio Pérsico; 13. Ricardo Campana; 14. Humberto Maschio; 15. Juan J. Moreno; 16. Oscar Stortini; 17. Julio Nuin; 18. Tomás Anglese; Guillermo Stábile (HC)	Mexico: 1. José Luis Sánchez; 2. Primitivo Carrillo; 3. Jorge Rodríguez; 4. Eduardo Colmenero; 5. Juan Arrieta; 6. Francisco Pérez; 7. Arturo Vargas; 8. Agustín Díaz; 9. Francisco Noriega; 10. Ramón Sigifredo Mercado; 11. Felipe Negrete; 12. Juan Bosco Martínez; 13. Víctor Nava; 14. Fernando López; 15. Alfonso González; 16. Joaquín Fierro; 17. Elías Vázquez; 18. Gustavo Ríos; 19. Ramón Martínez; 20. Alfredo Hernández; 21. Héctor Segura; 22. Gonzalo Guerrero; (Spain) Antonio López Herranz (HC)	Netherlands Antilles: 1. Ergilio Hato; 2. Pedro Matrona; 3. Wilfred de Lannoy; 4. Moises Bicentini; 5. Ludgero Adoptie; 6. Guillermo Giribaldi; 7. Willys Heyliger; 8. Ronald de Lannoy; 9. Hubert Schoop; 10. Eustaquio Bernardina; 11. Julio Jansen; 12. Wilhelm Canword; 13. Edmundo Vlinder; 14. Luis Antonio Brion; 15. Raymundo Kemp; 16. Francisco Gomez; 17. Marco Tromp; 18. Pedro Koolman; 19. José Arcangel La Rosa; 20. Antonio Klabeer; 21. Hubert Hoek; 22. Erno Jansen; (Brazil) Pedro Celestino da Cunha (HC)

== Goalscorers ==
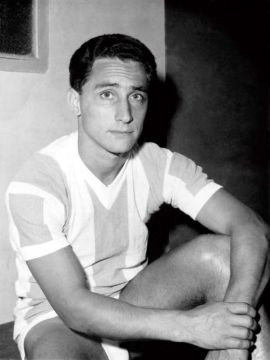
José Sanfilippo, top scorer with 8 goals

There were 53 goals scored in 12 matches, for an average of 4.42 goals per match.

8 goals

- (Argentina) José Sanfilippo

4 goals

- (Argentina) Humberto Maschio
- (Mexico) Ramón Sigifredo Mercado

3 goals

- (Argentina) Norberto Menéndez
- (Colony of Curaçao and Dependencies) Moises Bicentini
- (Colony of Curaçao and Dependencies) Hubert Schoop
- (Venezuela) Pedro Díaz
- (Venezuela) Gastón Monterola

2 goals

- (Argentina) Ricardo Pegnotti
- (Argentina) José Yudica
- (Mexico) Francisco Noriega
- (Colony of Curaçao and Dependencies) Ronald de Lannoy

1 goal

- (Argentina) Ricardo Campana
- (Argentina) Óscar Claria
- (Argentina) Héctor Molina
- (Argentina) Antonio Pérsico
- (Mexico) Alfonso González
- (Mexico) Ramón Martínez
- (Mexico) Felipe Negrete
- (Mexico) Jorge Rodríguez
- (Colony of Curaçao and Dependencies) Eustáquio Bernardina
- (Colony of Curaçao and Dependencies) Willys Heyliger
- (Colony of Curaçao and Dependencies) Raymundo Kemp
- (Venezuela) Rafael González
- (Venezuela) Antonio Rodríguez

1 own goal

- (Mexico) Juan Bosco Martínez (against Venezuela)

Source: RSSSF

== Bibliography ==
- Olderr, Steven (2009). The Pan American Games: A Statistical History, 1951-1999, bilingual edition. McFarland & Company. ISBN 0786443367. ISBN 9780786443369.
