= Honduras national football team results (1920–1959) =

Honduras
1920–1959 season

This is a list of the Honduras national football team results from 1920 to 1959.

== 1921 ==
Honduras made its debut in the Independence Centenary Games held in Guatemala City in September 1921, losing 10–1 to Guatemala. There were other sources that published a final score of 9–0.

14 September 1921 ICG	Guatemala	10–1	Honduras	Guatemala City, Guatemala
CST	Minondo; Kiehnle; Aldaz; Enríquez; Dougherty		Raudales	Stadium: Campo de Marte; Referee: Record: 0–0–1 (1:10)

== 1930 ==
18 March 1930 CACG	Honduras	5–4	Jamaica	Havana, Cuba
EST	Bustillo			Stadium: La Tropical; Referee: Record: 1–0–0 (5:4)

20 March 1930 CACG	Cuba	7–0	Honduras	Havana, Cuba
EST				Stadium: La Tropical; Referee: Record: 0–0–1 (0:7)

23 March 1930 CACG	Cuba	5–0	Honduras	Havana, Cuba
EST				Stadium: La Tropical; Referee: Record: 0–0–2 (0:12)

29 March 1930 CACG	El Salvador	1–4	Honduras	Havana, Cuba
EST	Calvo			Stadium: La Tropical; Referee: Record: 1–0–0 (4:1)

1 April 1930 CACG	Costa Rica	8–0	Honduras	Havana, Cuba
EST	Madrigal; Serrano; Morales; Soto			Stadium: La Tropical; Referee: Pablo Ferre (ESP); Record: 0–0–1 (0:8)

== 1935 ==
25 March 1935 CACG	Cuba	3–0	Honduras	San Salvador, El Salvador
15:45 CST				Stadium: Estadio Nacional Flor Blanca; Referee: Manuel Rodríguez (CRC); Record: 0–0–3 (0:15)

28 March 1935 CACG	El Salvador	3–4	Honduras	San Salvador, El Salvador
08:00 CST	Cruz; Morales; Chacón			Stadium: Estadio Nacional Flor Blanca; Attendance: 8,000; Referee: Manuel Rodríguez (CRC); Record: 2–0–0 (8:4)

31 March 1935 CACG	Guatemala	0–0	Honduras	San Salvador, El Salvador
08:00 CST				Stadium: Estadio Nacional Flor Blanca; Attendance: 20,000; Referee: Manuel Rodríguez (CRC); Record: 0–1–1 (1:10)

1 April 1935 CACG	Honduras	2–8	Mexico	San Salvador, El Salvador
08:00 CST	Castro 69'; Puerto 88'		3' Pérez; 8' 55' 80' López; 26' 42' 73' Lores; 29' Lozano	Stadium: Estadio Nacional Flor Blanca; Attendance: 15,000; Referee: José Herrera (SLV); Record: 0–0–1 (2:8)

3 April 1935 CACG	Costa Rica	6–0	Honduras	San Salvador, El Salvador
08:00 CST	Evans 5'; Amador 15' 25' 85'; Dávila 63' 89'			Stadium: Estadio Nacional Flor Blanca; Attendance: 20,000; Referee: Augusto Escalante (SLV); Record: 0–0–2 (0:14)

== 1946 ==
23 February 1946 CCCF	Honduras	0–1	Panama	San José, Costa Rica
CST	Sosa (penalty missed); Starting XI; Garbutt; Doblado; Hidalgo; Villatoro; Sosa; Fortín; Fajardo; Barahona; González; Mendoza; Arzú; Substitutes Coach; Kovacs		83' Ferreira; Starting XI; Arosemena; Ospino; Tejada; Louis; Latiff; Pinnock (substituted off); Valdés (substituted off); Campos; Prado (substituted off); Morales; Ferreira; Substitutes; Rosas (substituted on); Figueroa (substituted on); Rangel (substituted on); Coach (PAN) Ospino	Stadium: Estadio Nacional; Referee: Willy Jones; Record: 0–0–1 (0:1)

28 February 1946 CCCF	Guatemala	3–5	Honduras	San José, Costa Rica
CST	Toledo 20'; Camposeco 65'; Durán 75'		32' Sosa; 40' 60' 62' Arzú; 89' Palencia	Stadium: Estadio Nacional; Referee: Juan López (MEX); Record: 1–1–1 (6:13)

7 March 1946 CCCF	Costa Rica	5–1	Honduras	San José, Costa Rica
CST			4' Arzú	Stadium: Estadio Nacional; Referee: Record: 0–0–3 (1:19)

10 March 1946 CCCF	El Salvador	3–1	Honduras	San José, Costa Rica
CST	Gutiérrez			Stadium: Estadio Nacional; Referee: Record: 2–0–1 (9:7)

13 March 1946 CCCF	Honduras	10–0	Nicaragua	San José, Costa Rica
CST				Stadium: Estadio Nacional; Referee: Record: 1–0–0 (10:0)

== 1950 ==
27 February 1950 CACG	Honduras	1–2	Mexico	Guatemala City, Guatemala
20:00 CST	Godoy 88'		24' Luna; 44' Jinich	Stadium: Estadio Revolución; Referee: Giuseppe Carpani (ITA); Record: 0–0–2 (3:10)

3 March 1950 CACG	Colombia	0–2	Honduras	Guatemala City, Guatemala
22:00 CST			9' Arzú; 71' Castro	Stadium: Estadio Revolución; Referee: Giuseppe Carpani (ITA); Record: 1–0–0 (2:0)

6 March 1950 CACG	Guatemala	0–1	Honduras	Guatemala City, Guatemala
20:00 CST			12' Arzú	Stadium: Estadio Revolución; Referee: Record: 2–1–1 (7:13)

9 March 1950 CACG	Curaçao	2–1	Honduras	Guatemala City, Guatemala
22:00 CST	Kemp 17'; Krips 60'		64' Calderini	Stadium: Estadio Revolución; Referee: Record: 0–0–1 (1:2)

11 March 1950 CACG	El Salvador	1–2	Honduras	Guatemala City, Guatemala
20:00 CST	Corado 38'		6' Velásquez; 39' Godoy	Stadium: Estadio Revolución; Attendance: 58,000; Referee: Record: 3–0–1 (11:8)

14 March 1950 CACG	Guatemala	n/p	Honduras	Guatemala City, Guatemala
CST				Stadium: Estadio Revolución; Referee: Record: 2–1–1 (7:13)

== 1953 ==
8 March 1953 CCCF	Honduras	2–1	Nicaragua	San José, Costa Rica
CST	Ramírez 33' 50'		10' Morales	Stadium: Estadio Nacional; Referee: Sergio Bustamante (CHI); Record: 2–0–0 (12:1)

11 March 1953 CCCF	Guatemala	1–0	Honduras	San José, Costa Rica
CST	García 9'			Stadium: Estadio Nacional; Referee: William Crawford (ENG); Record: 2–1–2 (7:14)

13 March 1953 CCCF	Costa Rica	4–1	Honduras	San José, Costa Rica
CST	Goñi 20'; Rodríguez 55'; Valenciano		Leaky	Stadium: Estadio Nacional; Referee: William Crawford (ENG); Record: 0–0–4 (2:23)

15 March 1953 CCCF	El Salvador	0–3	Honduras	San José, Costa Rica
CST			7' 40' Godoy; Padilla	Stadium: Estadio Nacional; Referee: William Crawford (ENG); Record: 4–0–1 (14:8)

19 March 1953 CCCF	Honduras	4–3	Netherlands Antilles	San José, Costa Rica
CST	Ramírez (pen.); Zelaya; Padilla		Jansen; Canword	Stadium: Estadio Nacional; Referee: Record: 1–0–1 (5:5)

21 March 1953 CCCF	Honduras	3–1	Panama	San José, Costa Rica
CST	Cruz 9'; Ramírez 73'; Leaky		Linares	Stadium: Estadio Nacional; Referee: Record: 1–0–1 (3:2)

== 1955 ==
14 August 1955 CCCF	Honduras	3–0	Cuba	Tegucigalpa, Honduras
CST	Ramírez 8' 47'; Guerrero 49'			Stadium: Estadio Tiburcio Carías Andino; Referee: Reg Leafe (ENG); Record: 1–0–3 (3:15)

17 August 1955 CCCF	Honduras	3–1	El Salvador	Tegucigalpa, Honduras
CST	Enamorado 39' 89'; Ramírez 69'		33' Ruano	Stadium: Estadio Tiburcio Carías Andino; Referee: Reg Leafe (ENG); Record: 5–0–1 (17:9)

20 August 1955 CCCF	Honduras	0–2	Netherlands Antilles	Tegucigalpa, Honduras
CST			44' Schoop; 77' Jansen	Stadium: Estadio Tiburcio Carías Andino; Referee: Reg Leafe (ENG); Record: 1–0–2 (5:7)

22 August 1955 CCCF	Honduras	1–1	Aruba	Tegucigalpa, Honduras
CST	70'		24' Rodríguez	Stadium: Estadio Tiburcio Carías Andino; Referee: Record: 0–1–0 (1:1)

25 August 1955 CCCF	Honduras	n/p	Guatemala	Tegucigalpa, Honduras
CST				Stadium: Estadio Tiburcio Carías Andino; Referee: Record: 2–1–2 (7:14)

28 August 1955 CCCF	Honduras	1–2	Costa Rica	Tegucigalpa, Honduras
CST	Rivera 56'		29' Monge; 37' (o.g.) Sosa	Stadium: Estadio Tiburcio Carías Andino; Referee: Reg Leafe (ENG); Record: 0–0–5 (3:25)

== 1957 ==
11 August 1957 CCCF	Honduras	2–1	Panama	Willemstad, Netherlands Antilles
AST	Zelaya 9' 42'		85' Rodríguez	Stadium: Rif Stadion; Referee: Vincenzo Orlandini (ITA); Record: 2–0–1 (5:3)

16 August 1957 CCCF	Haiti	2–1	Honduras	Willemstad, Netherlands Antilles
AST	Fenol 20'; Tassy 40'		29' Suazo	Stadium: Rif Stadion; Referee: Vincenzo Orlandini (ITA); Record: 0–0–1 (1:2)

21 August 1957 CCCF	Cuba	0–2	Honduras	Willemstad, Netherlands Antilles
AST			9' Leaky; 67' Suazo	Stadium: Rif Stadion; Referee: Vincenzo Orlandini (ITA); Record: 2–0–3 (5:15)

25 August 1957 CCCF	Curaçao	1–1	Honduras	Willemstad, Netherlands Antilles
AST	Canword 16'		69' Ramírez	Stadium: Rif Stadion; Referee: Vincenzo Orlandini (ITA); Record: 1–1–2 (6:8)

== 1959 ==
14 December 1959 Friendly	Costa Rica	6–1	Honduras	San Salvador, El Salvador
CST				Referee: Record: 0–0–6 (4:31)

== Record ==
Description	Record	Goals
1920s record	0–0–1	1:10
1930s record	3–1–6	15:45
1940s record	2–0–3	17:12
1950s record	11–2–8	35:32
All-time record	16–3–18	68:99
