= 1957 CCCF Championship squads =

These are the squads for the countries that played in the 1957 CCCF Championship.

The age listed for each player is on 11 August 1957, the first day of the tournament. The numbers of caps and goals listed for each player do not include any matches played after the start of the tournament. The club listed is the club for which the player last played a competitive match before the tournament. The nationality for each club reflects the national association (not the league) to which the club is affiliated. A flag is included for coaches who are of a different nationality than their own national team.

== Cuba ==
Head coach: Emilio Muriente

No.	Pos.	Player	Date of birth (age)	Caps	Goals	Club
1	GK	Eloy Martínez		3	0	(Football Association of Cuba) Juventud Asturiana
2	GK	Jorge Pérez Castañeda		0	0	(Football Association of Cuba) Deportivo Mordazo
3	DF	Román Mario Valdés		0	0	(Football Association of Cuba) Iberia
4	DF	Antonio Puebla		0	0	(Football Association of Cuba) Juventud Asturiana
5	DF	Rodolfo Portoundo		5	0	(Football Association of Cuba) San Francisco
6	DF	Ramón Peñalver	31 August 1935 (aged 21)	4	0	(Football Association of Cuba) Deportivo Mordazo
7	MF	Sergio Padrón	5 December 1936 (aged 20)	1	0	(Football Association of Cuba) San Francisco
8	MF	Francisco Torrent		4	0	Free agent
9	MF	Antonio "Tony" Fernández		0	0	(Football Association of Cuba) El Cerro
10	MF	Lázaro Figueroa		0	0	(Football Association of Cuba) Juventud Asturiana
11	MF	Francisco Enrique Morell		3	0	(Football Association of Cuba) Juventud Asturiana
12	MF	Agustín Mezquita		5	0	(Football Association of Cuba) San Francisco
13	MF	Mario "Pilillo" Herrera		2	0	(Football Association of Cuba) San Francisco
14	MF	Adrián Benito Valdés		0	0	(Football Association of Cuba) Iberia
15	FW	Ángel Piedra		4	0	(Football Association of Cuba) Deportivo Mordazo
16	FW	Alberto Gutiérrez		5	1	(Football Association of Cuba) San Francisco
17	FW	Genaro Carmona		4	0	(Football Association of Cuba) San Francisco
18	FW	Manuel Marco Bobadilla		0	0	(Football Association of Cuba) Deportivo Mordazo
19	FW	Mario Sanz		0	0	(Football Association of Cuba) Iberia
20	FW	Manuel Nazabal		0	0	(Football Association of Cuba) Juventud Asturiana
21	FW	José Doce		0	0	(Football Association of Cuba) Casino Español
22	FW	Nicolás Martínez		0	0	Free agent
23	FW	Zenaldo García		0	0	Free agent

== Curaçao ==
Head coach: Pedro Celestino da Cunha

No.	Pos.	Player	Date of birth (age)	Caps	Goals	Club
1	GK	Roberto Tweeboom		0	0	(Curaçao Football Federation) SUBT
2	GK	Frank Paulina		5	0	(Curaçao Football Federation) Jong Holland
3	GK	Víctor Celso Polinet		0	0	(Curaçao Football Federation) Sithoc
4	DF	Wilhelm Canword	11 July 1933 (aged 24)	13	2	(Curaçao Football Federation) SUBT
5	DF	Pedro Matrona	9 December 1927 (aged 29)	10	0	(Curaçao Football Federation) Jong Holland
6	DF	Wilfred de Lanoi	12 February 1929 (aged 28)	13	0	(Curaçao Football Federation) Jong Holland
7	DF	Hilario Beltrand		0	0	(Curaçao Football Federation) Sithoc
8	DF	Otilio Rojer		0	0	(Curaçao Football Federation) Centro Dominguito
9	MF	Edmundo Vlinder	6 February 1926 (aged 31)	15	0	(Curaçao Football Federation) SUBT
10	MF	Guillermo Giribaldi	17 May 1929 (aged 28)	16	0	(Curaçao Football Federation) Sithoc
11	MF	Ludgero Adoptie		6	0	(Curaçao Football Federation) Jong Holland
12	MF	Clinio Thielman		0	0	(Curaçao Football Federation) SUBT
13	FW	Hubert Daal		0	0	(Curaçao Football Federation) SUBT
14	FW	Edgar Meulens		0	0	(Curaçao Football Federation) SUBT
15	MF	Willys Heyliger	9 January 1926 (aged 31)	7	2	(Curaçao Football Federation) SUBT
16	FW	Romualdo Valerian		0	0	(Curaçao Football Federation) Centro Dominguito
17	FW	Ronald de Lanoi		6	1	(Curaçao Football Federation) Sithoc
18	DF	José María Bibiana		0	0	(Curaçao Football Federation) Sithoc
19	FW	Hubert Schoop		6	3	(Curaçao Football Federation) Jong Holland
20	FW	Eustaquio Bernardina		5	1	(Curaçao Football Federation) Jong Holland
21	FW	Francisco Romualdo Gómez	4 October 1933 (aged 23)	8	1	(Curaçao Football Federation) SUBT
22	FW	Hubert Sambo		0	0	(Curaçao Football Federation) Sithoc

== Haiti ==
Head coach: Lucien Barosy

No.	Pos.	Player	Date of birth (age)	Caps	Goals	Club
1	GK	Michel Blain		0	0	(Haitian Football Federation) Aigle Noir
2	GK	René Vertus		0	0	(Haitian Football Federation) Racing Haïtien
3	DF	Claude Legros	23 May 1935 (aged 22)	0	0	(Haitian Football Federation) Victory
4	DF	Michel Morin		0	0	(Haitian Football Federation) Victory
5	DF	Jean Germilus Cadet		0	0	(Haitian Football Federation) Violette
6	DF	André Dieudonné		1	0	(Haitian Football Federation) Aigle Noir
7	DF	Joseph Beaulieu		1	0	(Haitian Football Federation) Violette
8	MF	Gérard Blaise		1	0	(Haitian Football Federation) Victory
9	MF	Jean-Baptiste Antoine		0	0	(Haitian Football Federation) Victory
10	FW	Antoine Tassy	26 March 1924 (aged 33)	5	1	(Haitian Football Federation) Racing Haïtien
11	FW	Gérald Haig		3	1	(Haitian Football Federation) Violette
12	FW	Louis Jacques		2	0	(Haitian Football Federation) Racing Haïtien
13	FW	Paul Desrosiers		1	0	(Haitian Football Federation) Aigle Noir
14	FW	Gérard Delpeche		0	0	(Haitian Football Federation) Violette
15	FW	André Bovil		0	0	(Haitian Football Federation) Aigle Noir
16	FW	Phenol Charles		1	0	(Haitian Football Federation) Aigle Noir
17	FW	Pierre Roc		3	0	(Haitian Football Federation) Racing Haïtien
18	MF	Gérard Elie		0	0	(Haitian Football Federation) Violette
19	MF	Antonie Cabrol		0	0	
20	MF	Gogo Verna		1	0	
21		André Wilson		0	0	
22		Jean Marie		0	0	
23		Joseph Haig		0	0	

== Honduras ==
Head coach: Carlos Padilla

No.	Pos.	Player	Date of birth (age)	Caps	Goals	Club
1	GK	Efraín Salinas		1	0	(National Autonomous Federation of Football of Honduras) Olimpia
2	GK	Jorge Alberto Zavala		1	0	(National Autonomous Federation of Football of Honduras) Olimpia
3	GK	Julio "Brujo" Martínez		9	0	(National Autonomous Federation of Football of Honduras) Hibueras
4	DF	Jorge Alberto Solís	1 January 1935 (aged 22)	2	0	(National Autonomous Federation of Football of Honduras) Olimpia
5	DF	Fausto Yu Shan		0	0	(National Autonomous Federation of Football of Honduras) Olimpia
6	DF	Antonio "Toño" Rodríguez		6	0	(National Autonomous Federation of Football of Honduras) Sula
7	DF	Roy Padilla		0	0	(National Autonomous Federation of Football of Honduras) Olimpia
8	DF	Alberto Valerio		0	0	(National Autonomous Federation of Football of Honduras) Hibueras
9	DF	Héctor Molina		4	0	(National Autonomous Federation of Football of Honduras) Federal
10	MF	Carlos Suazo	8 March 1936 (aged 21)	2	0	(National Autonomous Federation of Football of Honduras) Olimpia
11	MF	Rolando Polio		0	0	(National Autonomous Federation of Football of Honduras) Motagua
12	MF	Fernando Zelaya		0	0	(National Autonomous Federation of Football of Honduras) Olimpia
13	MF	Francisco Zamora	28 October 1939 (aged 17)	0	0	(National Autonomous Federation of Football of Honduras) Hibueras
14	MF	Porfirio Betancourt		0	0	(National Autonomous Federation of Football of Honduras) Sula
15	FW	Felipe Barahona		0	0	(National Autonomous Federation of Football of Honduras) Olimpia
16	MF	Ronald Leaky		8	2	(National Autonomous Federation of Football of Honduras) Olimpia
17	MF	Abraham Pavón		1	0	(National Autonomous Federation of Football of Honduras) Olimpia
18	MF	Óscar Navarrete		0	0	(National Autonomous Federation of Football of Honduras) Federal
19	FW	Melvin Prince		2	1	(National Autonomous Federation of Football of Honduras) Olimpia
20	FW	Guillermo Guerrero		1	1	(National Autonomous Federation of Football of Honduras) Olimpia
21	FW	Rodolfo Godoy	1928 (aged 28–29)	9	8	(National Autonomous Federation of Football of Honduras) Motagua
22	FW	Andrés Salinas		0	0	(National Autonomous Federation of Football of Honduras) Olimpia
23	FW	Reynaldo Zelaya		9	1	(National Autonomous Federation of Football of Honduras) Olimpia

== Panama ==
Head coach: Gilberto Casanova

No.	Pos.	Player	Date of birth (age)	Caps	Goals	Club
1	GK	Andrés Castillo		0	0	(Panamanian Football Federation)
2	GK	Luis Alberto Acosta		0	0	(Panamanian Football Federation)
3	DF	Everardo Vega		0	0	(Panamanian Football Federation)
4	DF	Emilio Jorge Samuel		0	0	(Panamanian Football Federation)
5	DF	Braulio Arosemena		0	0	(Panamanian Football Federation)
6	MF	Adolfo Díaz Gáez	20 May 1930 (aged 27)	4	0	(Panamanian Football Federation)
7	MF	Alfredo Sandiford		20	0	(Panamanian Football Federation)
8	MF	Alvin Moore		0	0	(Panamanian Football Federation)
9	MF	Rafael Ureta		0	0	(Panamanian Football Federation)
10	MF	Luis Guillermo Vega		0	0	(Panamanian Football Federation)
11	MF	Antonio Enrique Aguilar		0	0	(Panamanian Football Federation)
12	FW	Luis Carlos Ponce	22 August 1932 (aged 24)	6	1	(Panamanian Football Federation)
13	FW	Francisco Ponce		5	0	(Panamanian Football Federation)
14	FW	Luis Carlos Lemus		3	0	(Panamanian Football Federation)
15	FW	Jorge Deanes		0	0	(Panamanian Football Federation)
16	FW	Vicente Rodríguez		0	0	(Panamanian Football Federation)
17	FW	Alberto Gordon		0	0	(Panamanian Football Federation)
18	MF	Carl Janneau		0	0	(Panamanian Football Federation)
19	MF	Wolfgang Hubner		0	0	(Panamanian Football Federation)
20	MF	Pablo Félix Rodríguez		0	0	(Panamanian Football Federation)
21		Luis Miranda		0	0	(Panamanian Football Federation)
22		Ricaurte Rodríguez		0	0	(Panamanian Football Federation)
23		José Cabrera		0	0	(Panamanian Football Federation)
