= Football at the 1950 Central American and Caribbean Games =

Tournament details
- Host country: Guatemala
- Dates: 26 February – 14 March
- Teams: 9 (from 2 confederations)
- Venue: 1 (in 1 host city)

Final positions
- Champions: Curaçao
- Runners-up: Guatemala
- Third place: Honduras
- Fourth place: El Salvador

Tournament statistics
- Matches played: 22
- Goals scored: 69 (3.14 per match)
- Top scorer(s): (Guatemala) Mario Camposeco (5 goals)

Football was contested for men only at the 1950 Central American and Caribbean Games in Guatemala City, Guatemala.

The gold medal was won by Curaçao who earned 4 points in the final round.

== Participating teams ==
Team	Appearance	Previous best performance
Colombia	3rd	Gold medal (1946)
Costa Rica	5th	Silver medal (1930, 1935, 1938)
Curaçao	2nd	Bronze medal (1946)
El Salvador	4th	Bronze medal (1935)
Guatemala	4th	6th (1930, 1935, 1946)
Haiti	1st	
Honduras	3rd	Bronze medal (1930)
Mexico	3rd	Gold medal (1935, 1938)
Nicaragua	1st	

While only the federation of Curaçao (C.V.B.) were FIFA members at the time (the Dutch Antilles federation N.A.V.U. was not founded until 1958), the team entering here was a Dutch Antilles selection representing the N.A.O.C., the olympic committee of the territory.

== Venue ==
Guatemala City
Estadio Mateo Flores
Capacity: 30,000
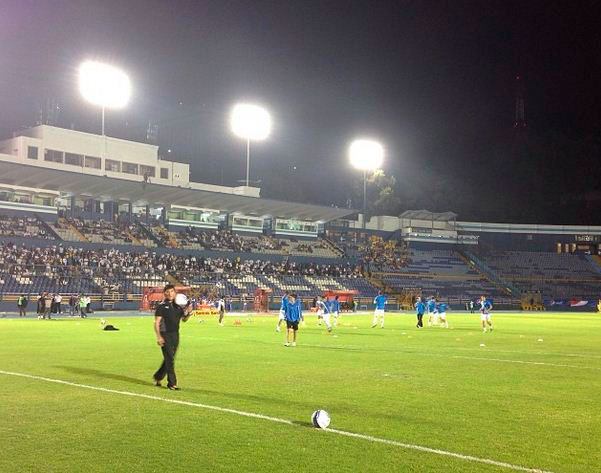

== Controversy ==
Costa Rica withdrew from the Games after a pitch invasion by the spectators at the end of their match against Dutch Antilles, following a brawl between players caused by a collision between Costa Rica player Calleta Molina and Dutch Antilles keeper Ergilio Hato; when the pitch was cleared, Dutch Antilles again took the field but Costa Rica refused to continue.

== First round ==
=== Group A ===
Pos	Team	Pld	W	D	L	GF	GA	GD	Pts	Qualification
1	Curaçao	3	2	1	0	15	2	+13	5	Final round
2	El Salvador	3	2	1	0	6	2	+4	5	Final round
3	Haiti	3	1	0	2	4	6	−2	2	
4	Nicaragua	3	0	0	3	4	19	−15	0	
–	Costa Rica	0	0	0	0	0	0	0	0	Withdrew

26 February 1950
CST

Costa Rica	1–0	El Salvador
Retana 85' (pen.)	Report

Estadio de la Revolución, Guatemala City, Guatemala
26 February 1950
CST

Haiti	4–2	Nicaragua
	Report

Estadio de la Revolución, Guatemala City, Guatemala
27 February 1950
CST

Costa Rica	1-0 Abandoned at 1–0 in 87' after a pitch invasion	Curaçao
Muñoz 10'	Report

Estadio de la Revolución, Guatemala City, Guatemala
28 February 1950
CST

El Salvador	4–1	Nicaragua
M. Durán 12', 53'; Corado 46', 48'	Report	Ubieta 24'

Estadio de la Revolución, Guatemala City, Guatemala
1 March 1950
CST

Curaçao	1–1	El Salvador
Heyliger 55'	Report	Lucha 16'

Estadio de la Revolución, Guatemala City, Guatemala
1 March 1950
CST

Costa Rica	0-1 Costa Rica withdrew, so match was awarded to Haiti 1-0	Haiti
	Report

Estadio de la Revolución, Guatemala City, Guatemala
2 March 1950
CST

Curaçao	11–1	Nicaragua
	Report

Estadio de la Revolución, Guatemala City, Guatemala
3 March 1950
CST

El Salvador	1–0	Haiti
Herrera (?)	Report

Estadio de la Revolución, Guatemala City, Guatemala
4 March 1950
CST

Costa Rica	0-1 Costa Rica withdrew, so match was awarded to Nicaragua 1-0	Nicaragua
	Report

Estadio de la Revolución, Guatemala City, Guatemala
5 March 1950
CST

Curaçao	3–0	Haiti
Kemp (?); Coffie (?)	Report

Estadio de la Revolución, Guatemala City, Guatemala

=== Group B ===
Pos	Team	Pld	W	D	L	GF	GA	GD	Pts	Qualification
1	Honduras	3	2	0	1	4	2	+2	4	Final round
2	Guatemala	3	1	1	1	2	2	0	3	Final round playoff
3	Mexico	3	1	1	1	4	5	−1	3	Final round playoff
4	Colombia	3	1	0	2	5	6	−1	2	

26 February 1950
CST

Guatemala	2–1	Colombia
Osorio 7'; Camposeco 52'	Report	Avendaño 27'

Estadio de la Revolución, Guatemala City, Guatemala
27 February 1950
CST

Honduras	1–2	Mexico
Godoy 88'	Report	Luna 24'; Jinich 44'

Estadio de la Revolución, Guatemala City, Guatemala
28 February 1950
CST

Colombia	4–2	Mexico
Pérez 24'; J. Ramírez 67', 86'; Arenilla 75'	Report	V. Ramírez 14'; Farfán 60'

Estadio de la Revolución, Guatemala City, Guatemala
3 March 1950
CST

Colombia	0–2	Honduras
	Report	Arzú 9'; Castro 71'

Estadio de la Revolución, Guatemala City, Guatemala
4 March 1950
CST

Guatemala	0–0	Mexico
	Report

Estadio de la Revolución, Guatemala City, Guatemala
6 March 1950
CST

Guatemala	0–1	Honduras
	Report	?

Estadio de la Revolución, Guatemala City, Guatemala

=== Final round playoff ===
Guatemala and Mexico finished level on points, so a play-off had to be played to decide who would qualify to the final round

7 March 1950
CST

Guatemala	3–3 The match lasted 175 minutes	Mexico
Camposeco 13', 16'; J. Duran 111'	Report	V. Ramírez 69'; Jinich 71'; Luna 102'

Estadio de la Revolución, Guatemala City, Guatemala

=== Final round playoff replay ===
8 March 1950
CST

Guatemala	0–0	Mexico
	Report

Estadio de la Revolución, Guatemala City, Guatemala

=== Final round playoff second replay ===
10 March 1950
CST

Guatemala	2–1	Mexico
Camposeco 14', 40'	Report	Cobián 68'

Estadio de la Revolución, Guatemala City, Guatemala

== Final round ==
Pos	Team	Pld	W	D	L	GF	GA	GD	Pts	Result
1	Curaçao	3	2	0	1	5	4	+1	4	Gold medal
2	Guatemala	2	1	0	1	2	2	0	2	Silver medal
3	Honduras	2	1	0	1	3	3	0	2	Bronze medal
–	El Salvador	3	1	0	2	4	5	−1	2	Withdrew

9 March 1950
CST

Curaçao	2–1	Honduras
Kemp 17'; Krips 60'	Report	Calderini 64'

Estadio de la Revolución, Guatemala City, Guatemala
10 March 1950
CST

Curaçao	1–3	El Salvador
Krips 82'	Report	Corado 21'; Lucha 75'

Estadio de la Revolución, Guatemala City, Guatemala
11 March 1950
CST

Guatemala	0–2	Curaçao
	Report	Juliana 2'; Mercera 70'

Estadio de la Revolución, Guatemala City, Guatemala
11 March 1950
CST

El Salvador	1–2	Honduras
Corado 38'	Report	Velásquez 6'; Godoy 39'

Estadio de la Revolución, Guatemala City, Guatemala
13 March 1950
CST

Guatemala	2-0	El Salvador
Galan 78'; Aqueche 86'	Report

Estadio de la Revolución, Guatemala City, Guatemala
14 March 1950
CST

Guatemala	Canceled	Honduras
	Report

Estadio de la Revolución, Guatemala City, Guatemala

1950 Central American
and Caribbean Games

Curaçao
1st title

== Statistics ==
=== Goalscorers ===
There were 69 goals scored in 22 matches, for an average of 3.14 goals per match.

5 goals

- (Guatemala) Mario Camposeco

4 goals

- (El Salvador) Rafael Corado

2 goals

- (Colombia) Juan Ramírez
- (El Salvador) Gustavo Lucha
- (El Salvador) Manuel Durán
- (Honduras) Rodolfo Godoy
- (Mexico) Salvador Luna
- (Mexico) Moisés Jinich
- (Mexico) Víctor Ramírez
- (Colony of Curaçao and Dependencies) Guillermo Krips
- (Colony of Curaçao and Dependencies) Pedro Coffie
- (Colony of Curaçao and Dependencies) Raymundo Kemp

1 goal

- (Colombia) Apolinario Pérez
- (Colombia) Guillermo Avendaño
- (Colombia) Héctor Arenilla
- (Costa Rica) José Manuel Retana
- (Costa Rica) Guillermo Muñoz
- (El Salvador) Javier Herrera
- (Guatemala) Carlos Osorio
- (Guatemala) Julio Duran
- (Guatemala) Antonio Galan
- (Guatemala) Rubén Aqueche
- (Honduras) Adolfo Castro
- (Honduras) Emilio Calderini
- (Honduras) Pedro Velásquez
- (Honduras) Zacarías Arzú
- (Mexico) Salvador Farfán
- (Mexico) José María Cobián
- (Nicaragua) Carlos Ubieta
- (Colony of Curaçao and Dependencies) Willys Heyliger
- (Colony of Curaçao and Dependencies) Maximiliano Juliana
- (Colony of Curaçao and Dependencies) Romoldo Mercera
