= Bicentini =

Bicentini is a surname. Notable people with the surname include:

- Moises Bicentini (1931–2007), Curaçao football player
- Remko Bicentini (born 1968), Dutch-Curaçaoan football manager and player, son of Moises
