= Fulgencio Berdugo =

Colombian footballer (1918-2003)

Personal information
- Full name: Fulgencio Berdugo
- Date of birth: 14 June 1918
- Place of birth: Barranquilla, Colombia
- Date of death: 3 February 2003 (aged 84)
- Place of death: Barranquilla, Colombia
- Position: Forward

Senior career*
| Years | Team | Apps | (Gls) |
- Junior

International career
- Colombia
Medal record
Representing Colombia
Men's Football
Central American and Caribbean Games
| Gold medal – first place | 1946 Barranquilla | Team competition |
- * Club domestic league appearances and goals

Fulgencio Berdugo (June 14, 1918 – February 3, 2003) was a Colombian football player. He was born in Barranquilla, Colombia on June 14, 1918 and died in the same city on February 3, 2003. He played for different national and international soccer teams, including the Colombia national football team in the Copa América of 1945, scoring goals against Bolivia and Ecuador.

== Career ==
Berdugo played club football for Junior de Barranquilla, helping the club to a runner's-up finish in Colombia's first professional tournament. Berdugo also played on the island of Cuba and helped develop its professional soccer league.

== Honours ==
- Central American and Caribbean Games Gold Medal (1): 1946
