= Pedro Koolman =

Curaçaoan footballer (born 1933)

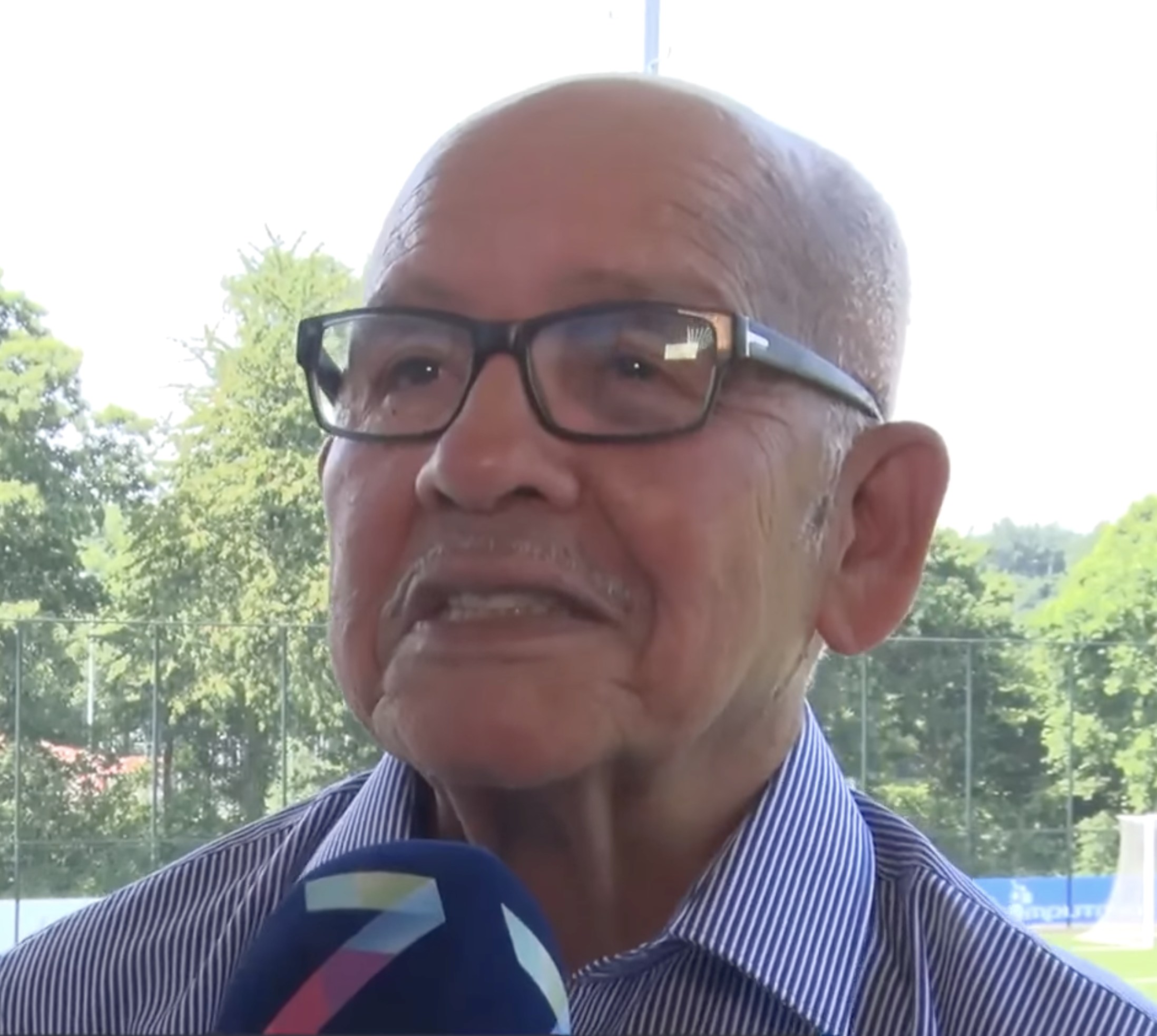

Personal information
- Full name: Pedro José Celestino Koolman
- Date of birth: 19 May 1933 (age 93)
- Place of birth: Curaçao
- Positions: Midfielder; left-back

Senior career*
Years	Team	Apps	(Gls)
–1957	SUBT		
1957–1963	NEC Nijmegen	162	

International career
1955	Territory of Curaçao	3+	(0+)
- * Club domestic league appearances and goals

Pedro José Celestino Koolman (born 19 May 1933) is a Curaçaoan former footballer who played as a midfielder and left-back.

== Playing career ==
Koolman joined NEC Nijmegen in 1957, alongside international teammate Moises Bicentini, with both becoming the first footballers from the Netherlands Antilles to play in the Netherlands. In total, he made 162 appearances for NEC across six seasons.

In 1955, he was called up to the Territory of Curaçao national team for the 1955 Pan American Games, where he did not play any matches as the team won bronze. Later that year, he was called up for the 1955 CCCF Championship, where he made three appearances as they finished runners-up.

== Post-playing career ==
Following his retirement, he worked as a football coach for over 50 years, including at De Treffers, and over 30 years at SV Orion, where he was coaching the club's youth team as of 2018.

== Personal life ==
Koolman has been diagnosed with dementia. In 2022, he suffered a head injury after he fell at his home, with a brain scan later revealing he also suffered a hemorrhage.
