= Max Villalobos =

Costa Rican footballer (born 1928)

Personal information
- Full name: Maximiliano Villalobos Miranda
- Date of birth: 26 January 1928 (age 98)
- Place of birth: Heredia, Costa Rica
- Position: Defender

Senior career*
Years	Team	Apps	(Gls)
1947–1949	Herediano		
1949–1952	Universidad de Bogotá	83	(0)
1953	Cúcuta Deportivo	19	(0)
1955–1955	Herediano		
1955–1968	Irapuato		

International career
1955	Costa Rica	6	(0)

Managerial career
- 1969: Irapuato
- 1973: Deportivo México
- 1983: Alajuelense
- * Club domestic league appearances and goals

Maximiliano Villalobos Miranda (born 26 January 1928) is a Costa Rican former footballer who played professionally in the Colombian Professional Football League and Mexican Primera División. He also represented Costa Rica at international level.

== Career ==
=== Club ===
Born in Heredia, Villalobos played as a defender. He began his career with Herediano, making his Costa Rican Primera División debut in 1947. He helped the club win three titles, two of them in his first stint with the club.

Villalobos began playing professional football in Colombia with Universidad de Bogotá in 1949. After three seasons with Universidad, he joined Cúcuta Deportivo for one season before returning to Herediano.

Villalobos would sign with Mexican Primera División side Deportivo Irapuato in 1955. He would play with Irapuato for 13 seasons, becoming an important part of the team for over a decade.

=== International ===
Villalobos made six appearances for the Costa Rica national football team, captaining the side to the 1955 CCCF Championship title.

=== Managerial ===
After he retired from playing, Villalobos became a football coach. He led Deportivo Irapuato a few months after finishing playing for the club. He was manager of Deportivo México in 1973 and he also led L.D. Alajuelense during the 1983 season, unexpectedly leaving while the club led the league with 14 matches remaining. He retired in 1983.

== Personal life ==
Villalobos is married to Colombian Ligia Castañeda. They have two daughters and a son.
