= Quico Chacón =

Costa Rican footballer (born 1934)

Personal information
- Full name: Carlos Francisco Córdoba Chacón
- Date of birth: 17 January 1934 (age 92)
- Place of birth: San Isidro de Coronado, Costa Rica
- Position: Central defender

Senior career*
| Years | Team | Apps | (Gls) |
| 1947–1950 | La Libertad | 16 | (0) |
- Club Sport Uruguay
| 1956–1957 | Atlas | 10 | (3) |
| | Club Sport Uruguay | 87 | (1) |

International career
| 1953 | Costa Rica | 1 | (0) |
- * Club domestic league appearances and goals

Carlos Francisco Córdoba Chacón, commonly known as Quico Chacón, (born 1 January 1934) is a former professional footballer who played in the Costa Rican Primera División and Mexican Primera División.

== Club career ==
Born in San Isidro de Coronado, Vázquez de Coronado, Chacón played as a central defender. He became the youngest player in the Costa Rican Primera División when he debuted for La Libertad on 17 August 1947 against Cartaginés. Chacón was playing for La Libertad's reserves and was just 13 years and 8 months old at the time.

Chacón joined La Libertad's first team in 1949, and would play for Club Sport Uruguay and the Mexican Primera División's Club Atlas before retiring.

== International career ==
Chacón made one appearance for the Costa Rica national football team on 17 March 1953 against Nicaragua, helping Costa Rica win the 1953 CCCF Championship.
