= Football at the 1946 Central American and Caribbean Games =

Tournament details
- Host country: Colombia
- Dates: 9–21 December
- Teams: 7 (from 2 confederations)
- Venue: 1 (in 1 host city)

Final positions
- Champions: Colombia (1st title)
- Runners-up: Panama
- Third place: Curaçao
- Fourth place: Costa Rica

Tournament statistics
- Matches played: 21
- Goals scored: 120 (5.71 per match)
- Top scorer(s): (Costa Rica) Gonzalo Fernández (Colony of Curaçao and Dependencies) Maximiliano Juliana (9 goals)

The football tournament at the 1946 Central American and Caribbean Games was held in Barranquilla from 9 to 21 December. Cuba and Mexico withdrew.

The gold medal was won by Colombia who earned 12 points.

== Participants ==
- Colombia (Hosts)
- Costa Rica
- Curaçao
- Guatemala
- Panama
- Puerto Rico
- Venezuela

== Table ==
2 points system used.

Pos	Team	Pld	W	D	L	GF	GA	GD	Pts
1	Colombia (C)	6	6	0	0	20	7	+13	12
2	Panama	6	4	1	1	23	8	+15	9
3	Curaçao	6	3	2	1	25	10	+15	8
4	Costa Rica	6	3	0	3	25	12	+13	6
5	Venezuela	6	2	0	4	12	11	+1	4
6	Guatemala	6	1	1	4	12	20	−8	3
7	Puerto Rico	6	0	0	6	3	52	−49	0

(C) Champions

== Results ==
9 December 1946

Colombia	4–2	Curaçao
L. González 10'; Granados 37', 82'; Arango 73'	Report	F. Jansen 3'; Juliana 50'

Estadio Municipal, Barranquilla
Referee: Manuel Soto (Chile)

9 December 1946

Panama	4–2	Guatemala
Rangel 46'; A. Martinez 47'; Anderson 55'; Valdés 61'	Report	Camposeco 29'; Toledo 52' (pen.)

Estadio Municipal, Barranquilla
Referee: Manuel Soto (Chile)

10 December 1946

Costa Rica	12–0	Puerto Rico
Fernández ?', ?', ?', ?'; Retana ?', ?', ?'; Araya ?', ?', ?'; Rojas ?'; W. Rodriguez ?'	Report

Estadio Municipal, Barranquilla
Referee: Manuel Soto (Chile)

12 December 1946

Venezuela	0–2	Colombia
	Report	Berdugo 2'; Arango 76'

Estadio Municipal, Barranquilla
Referee: Manuel Soto (Chile)

12 December 1946

Curaçao	2–2	Guatemala
F. Jansen 20'; M. Jansen 83'	Report	Toledo 40'; Melgar 73'

Estadio Municipal, Barranquilla
Referee: Manuel Soto (Chile)

13 December 1946

Panama	12–1	Puerto Rico
Anderson ?', ?', ?'; C. Martinez ?', ?', ?'; Rangel ?', ?'; De León ?', ?'; Morales ?', ?'	Report	Piñeiro ?'

Estadio Municipal, Barranquilla
Referee: Manuel Soto (Chile)

14 December 1946

Costa Rica	4–2	Venezuela
W. Rodríguez 17'; Moraux 33'; Araya 48'; Fernández 78'	Report	Blanco 59'; Sucre 86'

Estadio Municipal, Barranquilla
Referee: Manuel Soto (Chile)

15 December 1946

Colombia	4–2	Guatemala
Carrillo 3', 44', 80'; Arango 30'	Report	Camposeco 10', 64'

Estadio Municipal, Barranquilla
Referee: Manuel Soto (Chile)

15 December 1946

Curaçao	14–0	Puerto Rico
F. Jansen ?'; Mathilde ?'; M. Jansen ?'; Juliana ?', ?', ?', ?', ?', ?', ?'; Julia ?'; Kelkboom ?', ?' ? ?'	Report

Estadio Municipal, Barranquilla
Referee: Manuel Soto (Chile)

16 December 1946

Colombia	4–1	Puerto Rico
Berdugo 14', 63'; Cardona 23'; Ruiz 72' (pen.)	Report	Balado 19'

Estadio Municipal, Barranquilla
Referee: Manuel Soto (Chile)

16 December 1946

Costa Rica	6–0	Guatemala
Fernández ?', ?', ?'; Zeledón ?', ?'; Vargas ?'	Report

Estadio Municipal, Barranquilla
Referee: Manuel Soto (Chile)

16 December 1946

Panama	2–1	Venezuela
Anderson 42'; Ferreira 45'	Report	V. García 90+4'

Estadio Municipal, Barranquilla
Referee: Manuel Soto (Chile)

17 December 1946

Panama	2–2	Curaçao
C. Martinez 48'; Anderson 61'	Report	F. Jansen 51'; Giribaldi 75'

Estadio Municipal, Barranquilla
Referee: Manuel Soto (Chile)

18 December 1946

Venezuela	3–2	Guatemala
Sucre 10', 25', 28'	Report	Aqueche 39'; Camposeco 68'

Estadio Municipal, Barranquilla
Referee: Manuel Soto (Chile)

18 December 1946

Colombia	4–1	Costa Rica
Arango 15'; R. García 32'; Granados 42'; L. González 70'	Report	Fernández 87'

Estadio Municipal, Barranquilla
Referee: Manuel Soto (Chile)

19 December 1946

Curaçao	1–0	Venezuela
F. Jansen 9'	Report

Estadio Municipal, Barranquilla
Referee: Manuel Soto (Chile)

19 December 1946

Guatemala	4–1	Puerto Rico
Camposeco ?', ?'; Durán ?' de León ?'	Report	Balado ?'

Estadio Municipal, Barranquilla
Referee: Manuel Soto (Chile)

20 December 1946

Colombia	2–1	Panama
L. González 29'; Arango 55'	Report	C. Martinez 17'

Estadio Municipal, Barranquilla
Referee: Manuel Soto (Chile)

20 December 1946

Curaçao	4–2	Costa Rica
Mathilde ?', ?'; Juliana ?'; Haseth ?'	Report	Vargas ?'; Retana ?'

Estadio Municipal, Barranquilla
Referee: Manuel Soto (Chile)

20 December 1946

Venezuela	6–0	Puerto Rico
C. Rodríguez 23'; V. García 37', 60', 68'; Aparicio 52', 62'	Report

Estadio Municipal, Barranquilla
Referee: Manuel Soto (Chile)

21 December 1946

Panama	2–0	Costa Rica
C. Martinez 35'; Anderson 42'	Report

Estadio Municipal, Barranquilla
Referee: Manuel Soto (Chile)

1946 Central American
and Caribbean Games

Colombia
1st title

== Statistics ==
=== Goalscorers ===
There were 120 goals scored in 21 matches, for an average of 5.71 goals per match.

9 goals

- (Costa Rica) Gonzalo Fernández
- (Colony of Curaçao and Dependencies) Maximiliano Juliana

7 goals

- (Panama) James Santiago Anderson

6 goals

- (Guatemala) Mario Camposeco
- (Panama) Carlos Martinez

5 goals

- (Colombia) Carlos Arango
- (Colony of Curaçao and Dependencies) Federico Jansen

4 goals

- (Costa Rica) Jesús María Araya
- (Costa Rica) José Manuel Retana
- (Venezuela) Andrés Sucre
- (Venezuela) Víctor García

3 goals

- (Colombia) Fulgencio Berdugo
- (Colombia) Luis González Rubio
- (Colombia) Octavio Carrillo
- (Colombia) Rafael Granados
- (Panama) Luis Carlos Rangel
- (Colony of Curaçao and Dependencies) José Mathilde

2 goals

- (Costa Rica) Walker Rodriguez
- (Costa Rica) Manuel Vargas
- (Costa Rica) Miguel Ángel Zeledón
- (Guatemala) Carlos Humberto Toledo
- (Panama) Antonio Morales
- (Panama) Gastón De León
- (Colony of Curaçao and Dependencies) Frans Kelkboom
- (Colony of Curaçao and Dependencies) Mario Jansen
- (Venezuela) Rosendo Aparicio

1 goal

- (Colombia) Jaime Cardona
- (Colombia) Octavio Ruiz
- (Colombia) Rigoberto García
- (Costa Rica) José Luis Rojas
- (Costa Rica) Juan Balado
- (Costa Rica) Oscar Moraux
- (Costa Rica) Rafael Balado
- (Costa Rica) Rafael Piñeiro
- (Panama) Antonio Martinez
- (Panama) Juan Antonio Ferreira
- (Panama) Luis Carlos Valdés
- (Guatemala) Armando Durán
- (Guatemala) Efraín de León
- (Guatemala) Mario Melgar
- (Guatemala) Rubén Aqueche
- (Colony of Curaçao and Dependencies) Ailan Julia
- (Colony of Curaçao and Dependencies) Charles Haseth
- (Colony of Curaçao and Dependencies) Guillermo Giribaldi
- (Venezuela) Carlos Rodríguez
- (Venezuela) Ernesto Blanco
