= Jorge Brion =

Curaçaoan footballer (1933–2005)

Personal information
- Full name: Jorge Gerardo Brion
- Date of birth: 23 April 1933
- Date of death: 2 April 2005 (aged 71)
- Position: Forward

International career
Years	Team	Apps	(Gls)
- Netherlands Antilles

Jorge Gerardo Brion, nicknamed Gochi (23 April 1933 – 2 April 2005), was a Curaçaoan footballer. He competed in the men's tournament at the 1952 Summer Olympics. Brion died on 2 April 2005, at the age of 71.
