= Salvador Farfán =

Mexican footballer (1932–2023)

Personal information
- Full name: Salvador Farfán Vigueras
- Date of birth: 22 June 1932
- Place of birth: Mexico
- Date of death: 7 March 2023 (aged 90)
- Position: Midfielder

Senior career*
| Years | Team | Apps | (Gls) |
| 1949–1950 | España | | |
| 1950–1954 | América | | |
| 1954–1955 | Atlante | | |
| 1955–1960 | Cuautla | | |
| 1960–1963 | Atlante | | |
| 1963–1965 | Zacatepec | | |

International career
| 1962 | Mexico | 2 | (0) |
- * Club domestic league appearances and goals

Salvador Farfán Vigueras (22 June 1932 – 7 March 2023) was a Mexican football midfielder who played for Mexico in the 1962 FIFA World Cup. He also played for Atlante.

Farfan died on 7 March 2023, at the age of 90.
