= Mario Murillo (footballer) =

Costa Rican footballer (1927-2012)

Personal information
- Full name: Mario Murillo Chaverri
- Date of birth: 24 January 1927
- Place of birth: Santa Bárbara, Heredia, Costa Rica
- Date of death: 22 November 2012 (aged 85)
- Place of death: Costa Rica
- Positions: Defender; midfielder; goalkeeper

Senior career*
Years	Team	Apps	(Gls)
1943–1945	Herediano		
1945–1948	Moctezuma		
1948–1949	Veracruz		
1949	Herediano		
1950–1952	Universidad de Bogotá	71	(12)
1952	Litoral		
1955–1961	Herediano		

International career
1950–1957	Costa Rica	12	(5)
- * Club domestic league appearances and goals

Mario Murillo Chaverri (24 January 1927 – 22 November 2012) was a Costa Rican footballer who played professionally in the Colombian Professional Football League and Mexican Primera División. He also represented Costa Rica at international level.

== Club career ==
Born in Santa Bárbara, Heredia, Murillo played as a defender, midfielder and goalkeeper. He began his career with local Costa Rican Primera División side C.S. Herediano in 1943. He helped the club to a runner-up finish in the 1943 Costa Rican Primera División season.

Murillo began playing professional football with Mexican Primera División side Moctezuma de Orizaba in 1945. Three seasons later, he joined Tiburones Rojos de Veracruz for one season. Nicknamed El cañonero, Murillo returned to Herediano briefly before playing professionally in Colombia with Universidad de Bogotá from 1950 to 1952. He also played in Venezuela for Litoral Sport Club.

He finished his playing career in Costa Rica, winning two of his four Primera titles with Herediano in 1956 and 1961. A serious foot injury ended his career in 1961.

== International career ==
Murillo made 12 appearances for the Costa Rica national football team, making his debut in 1950.

== Personal life ==
Murillo's brother, Evaristo, was also a professional footballer.

After retiring as a player, Murillo worked 30 years for the Instituto Costarricense de Electricidad. Murillo died in November 2012.
