= Jorge Rodríguez (footballer, born 1925) =

Mexican footballer (1925–2017)

Personal information
- Full name: Jorge Rodríguez Navarro
- Date of birth: 4 April 1925
- Place of birth: Zapopan, Mexico
- Date of death: November 2017 (aged 92)

International career
Years	Team	Apps	(Gls)
- Mexico

Jorge Rodríguez Navarro (4 April 1925 – November 2017) was a Mexican footballer. He competed in the men's tournament at the 1948 Summer Olympics. Rodríguez died in November 2017, at the age of 92.
