= Adriaan Brokke =

Curaçaoan footballer

Personal information
- Full name: Adriaan Walter Brokke
- Date of birth: 22 October 1928
- Date of death: 25 March 2011 (aged 82)
- Position: Forward

Senior career*
Years	Team	Apps	(Gls)
- SV Racing Club Aruba

International career
1950-1953	Netherlands Antilles national football team		
1952	Netherlands Antilles national baseball team		
- * Club domestic league appearances and goals

Adriaan Walter Brokke (22 October 1928 – 25 March 2011), commonly known as Jani Brokke was an Aruban athlete who competed in the 1952 Summer Olympic Games. He represented Aruba and the Netherlands Antilles in teams of football, basketball, baseball and tennis.

== Sports career ==
As a forward footballer, he represented the Netherlands Antilles in the men's tournament at the 1952 Summer Olympics. He won gold with the Netherlands Antilles team (under the Curaçao Football Association) at the 1950 Central American and Caribbean Games and participated in the 1953 CCCF Championship.

In the football match of Aruba vs. Botafogo (3-1), in August 1952, Brokke scored the first goal when he took a penalty. He played for Aruba when they hosted and won a football series, in February 1953, at his home Wilhelmina Stadium, between Aruba, Surinam, British Guiana and a dirty playing professional club La Salle F.C. from Venezuela.

Brokke played for SV Racing Club Aruba, football, tennis as well as basketball. In each of the sports he won Aruban championships.

In August 1952 Brokke, baseball player of Nesbitt, was selected to be a reserve on the Netherlands Antilles national baseball team that played at the 1952 Amateur World Series in Havana, Cuba in September.

At the opening of the Wilhelminastadion in Oranjestad, Aruba, in 1952, Brokke took the athlete's oath.

=== Lago Sport Park Board ===
Brokke worked for the Eagle Refinery on the west side of the island, until the close down of operations towards the end of 1953. He thereafter took employment with the Lago company. In November 1954 Brokke got elected into the Lago Sport Park Board. The announcement of the election results mentioned that Brokke was 'regarded as Aruba's most popular all-round sportsman.'

== Personal life ==
In 1958 Brokke married Rika Veger (Aruba, March 7, 1936). They had two children.

Jani's brother Pedro played for RCA as well and in the same football team.

Singer and Aruban TV-presenter Jossy Brokke Jr. is a nephew of Jani and Pedro.
