= Ergilio Hato =

Dutch footballer

Personal information
- Full name: Ergilio Pedro Hato
- Date of birth: 7 November 1926
- Place of birth: Willemstad, Curacao
- Date of death: 18 December 2003 (aged 77)
- Place of death: Willemstad, Curacao
- Height: 1.78 m (5 ft 10 in)
- Position: Goalkeeper

Youth career
- CRKSV Jong Holland

Senior career*
Years	Team	Apps	(Gls)
1943–1959	CRKSV Jong Holland	101	(5)

International career
1944–1955	Territory of Curaçao	35	(5)
Medal record
Representing Territory of Curaçao
Men's Football
Central American and Caribbean Games
Bronze medal – third place	1946 Barranquilla	Team competition
Gold medal – first place	1950 Guatemala	Team competition
- * Club domestic league appearances and goals

Ergilio Pedro Hato (7 November 1926 – 18 December 2003), also known as Pantera Negra (Black Panther), was a goalkeeper from Curaçao in the former Netherlands Antilles. He was well known in the Caribbean and his reputation achieved beyond the boundaries of the region. He received offers to large teams including Ajax Amsterdam, Feyenoord Rotterdam and Real Madrid Club de Fútbol. However, he turned down the offers because he chose not to play professionally.

== History ==
His mother's last name was Hatot, but the Civil Registry couldn't place the name, so they decided to spell Ergilio's last name “Hato”. Hato was always an avid soccer player. Back in the day, school yards were set up as soccer fields and monks encouraged playing before school, during breaks, and after school. Hato (19 in 1945) would have been drafted for military service had the Curaçao Soccer Federation not hosted a large international competition with teams from Colombia, Aruba, Suriname and the Netherlands Feyenoord in 1945. Curaçao's “Dream Team” delivered a clean sweep. Feyenoord came in second. A huge disappointment for the Dutch, and a testament to Curaçao's innate talent despite its small size and limited resources.

Hato became known as the best goalkeeper in Latin America and the Caribbean. He took the Netherlands Antilles team to the Olympics in 1952 (they lost against Turkey) and led Curaçao's team to a bronze medal at the Pan American Games in 1955. Hato's international notoriety awarded him several lucrative offers to play professional soccer internationally, rejecting offers from teams from South America and Europe including Real Madrid, AFC Ajax and Feyenoord. He pursued a career at the ALM Antillean Airlines, raised a family, and played in his local club, CRKSV Jong Holland.

He lived up to his many nicknames on the field: Pantera Negra (Black Panther), Vliegende Vogel (Flying Bird) and Man van Elastiek (Elastic Man).

== Footnotes ==
The Dutch publishers SWP have released a book about Mister Hato and his life. More to be found at https://www.swpdigitaal.nl/p/ergilio-hato-simpel-sierlijk-sensationeel/10546 . This publishing is to be considered the only publication in book form about Hato, in Dutch and Antilian language. While the printed version is no longer available the book can be purchased as a PDF via this page, but can also be read for free online here."

== Honours ==
- The Ergilio Hato Stadium in Willemstad, Curaçao was named after him.
- Central American and Caribbean Games Bronze Medal (1): 1946
- Central American and Caribbean Games Gold Medal (1): 1950
- Pan American Games Bronze Medal (1): 1955
- CCCF Championship Silver Medal (1): 1955

== International goals ==
No.	Date	Venue	Opponent	Score	Result	Competition
1	11 March 1953	Estadio Nacional de Costa Rica, San José, Costa Rica	Nicaragua	2–0	8–0	1953 CCCF Championship
2	11 March 1953	Estadio Nacional de Costa Rica, San José, Costa Rica	Nicaragua	6–0	8–0	1953 CCCF Championship
3	12 March 1953	Estadio Nacional de Costa Rica, San José, Costa Rica	Panama	1–0	4–2	1953 CCCF Championship
4	12 March 1953	Estadio Nacional de Costa Rica, San José, Costa Rica	Panama	3–1	4–2	1953 CCCF Championship
5	22 March 1953	Estadio Nacional de Costa Rica, San José, Costa Rica	El Salvador	1–1	1–1	1953 CCCF Championship

Source: RSSSF
