= Mundo Kemp =

Aruban footballer (1922–2007)

Personal information
- Full name: Raymundo Quintino Kemp
- Date of birth: 31 October 1922
- Place of birth: Colony of Curaçao and Dependencies
- Date of death: 30 January 2007 (aged 84)
- Position: Defender

Senior career*
Years	Team	Apps	(Gls)
–1960	Aruba Juniors		(40+)
1961	Deportivo Fuera		

International career
1943–1958	Aruba	60+	(13+)
1950–1959	Netherlands Antilles		(5+)
- * Club domestic league appearances and goals

Raymundo Quintino Kemp (31 October 1922 – 30 January 2007) was an Aruban footballer who played as a defender. He was considered one of the best Aruban footballers of all time.

== Playing career ==
Kemp started his career in San Nicolaas, before joining Aruba Juniors in the early 1940s. With Aruba Juniors, he helped the club win four league titles, while finishing as runners-up at least five times. During World War II, he was part of a "Schutterij" team, which was made up of the best players in Aruba at the time.

In 1961, Kemp joined Deportivo Fuera, alongside former teammates like Adriaan Brokke and Juan Briezen, as well as Venezuelan footballer Rosendo Aparicio. That season, he was part of their team which scored 133 matches in 22 league matches.

== International career ==
Kemp made his debut for the Aruba national team in 1943. Between 1943 and 1958, he made over 60 appearances for Aruba, scoring at least 13 goals. He also made several appearances for the Netherlands Antilles national team between 1950 and 1959, notably helping them win gold at the 1950 Central American and Caribbean Games in Guatemala, silver at the 1959 Central American and Caribbean Games in Venezuela, and bronze at the 1955 Pan American Games in Mexico. Additionally, he represented them at the 1953 CCCF Championship.

Kemp was also part of the Netherlands Antilles' squad at the 1952 Summer Olympics in Finland, but didn't make an appearance in their 2–1 loss to Turkey.

== Later life and death ==
Following his retirement, Kemp became a referee. He died on 30 January 2007, at the age of 84.
