= Mon Rodríguez =

Costa Rican footballer (1928-2006)

Personal information
- Full name: Ramón Luis Rodríguez Soto
- Date of birth: 5 November 1928
- Place of birth: Tibás, San José, Costa Rica
- Date of death: 13 November 2006 (aged 78)
- Place of death: Costa Rica
- Position: Forward

Youth career
- Unión Deportiva Tibaseña

Senior career*
Years	Team	Apps	(Gls)
1949–1954	Orión		(45)
1954–1958	Irapuato		
1958–1959	Dragón		
1960	Águila		
1961–1962	Luis Ángel Firpo		
1963	Zelaya		
1964	Progreso		

International career
1953	Costa Rica	3	(2)

Managerial career
- Nicoya
- * Club domestic league appearances and goals

Ramón Luis "Mon" Rodríguez Soto (5 November 1928 – 13 November 2006), also known as Mon Rodríguez, was a Costa Rican footballer who played professionally in the Mexican Primera División.

He also represented Costa Rica at international level.

== Club career ==
Born in Tibás, San José, Rodríguez played as a forward. He began his career with local side Orión. He made his Costa Rican Primera División debut with Orión in 1949, scoring 13 goals in his first season.

Rodríguez began playing professional football with Mexican Primera División side Irapuato in 1954. Four seasons later, he moved to El Salvador to play for Dragón and Águila. Next, Rodríguez began a career as a player-manager, first with Luis Ángel Firpo, Zelaya and Progreso of Honduras. In 1965, he returned to Costa Rica where he retired from playing and managed local side Nicoya.

== International career ==
Rodríguez scored two goals in three appearances for the Costa Rica national football team, helping the side win the 1953 CCCF Championship.

== Personal life ==
Rodríguez worked for many years at the Banco Popular, retiring in 1990. He was married and had two children. He died in November 2006.
