= Carlos Alvarado (footballer, born 1927) =

Costa Rican footballer (1927–2024)

Personal information
- Full name: Carlos Alvarado Villalobos
- Date of birth: 19 December 1927
- Place of birth: Santa Bárbara, Heredia, Costa Rica
- Date of death: 27 July 2024 (aged 96)
- Place of death: Alajuela Province, Costa Rica
- Position: Goalkeeper

Senior career*
Years	Team	Apps	(Gls)
1944–1947	Alajuelense		
1947–1948	América		
1948–1950	Alajuelense		
1950	América de Cali	10	(0)
1950–1960	Alajuelense		

International career
1946–1960	Costa Rica	25	(0)
- * Club domestic league appearances and goals

Carlos Alvarado Villalobos (19 December 1927 – 27 July 2024) was a Costa Rican footballer who played as a goalkeeper. He also represented the Costa Rica national team at international level.

== Club career ==
Known as "Aguilucho", he was born in Santa Bárbara, Heredia, Alvarado played as a goalkeeper. He began his career with Alajuelense, making his Costa Rican Primera División debut in 1945. Alvarado spent most of his career with Alajuelense, winning six Primera División titles in the process. There, he earned the nickname "Aguilucho" (hawk) for the aggressive manner in which he attacked opponents trying to score. He would play 159 league games for Liga.

Alvarado began playing professional football with Mexican Primera División side América in 1947. He returned to Alajuelense after one season, and would spend three months in Colombia with América de Cali during 1950.

In a 1951 match against the Boca Juniors, Alvarado blocked a critical penalty shot in the 90th minute. Costa Rican president Otilio Ulate Blanco gave Alvarado his watch, which he stopped at the moment Alvarado blocked the shot.

During his career, Alvarado turned down offers to play for Italy's Genoa and Argentina's Boca Juniors.

== International career ==
Alvarado made 25 appearances for the Costa Rica national team, making his debut in 1946. He helped Costa Rica win the CCCF Championship three times (1953, 1955 and 1960).

== Death ==
Alvarado died on 27 July 2024, at the age of 96.
