= Moisés Jinich =

Mexican footballer (1927-2015)

Personal information
- Full name: Moisés Jinich Brook
- Date of birth: 15 December 1927
- Place of birth: Mexico City, Mexico
- Date of death: 2 March 2015 (aged 87)
- Position: Forward

Senior career*
Years	Team	Apps	(Gls)
- Atlante

International career
1954	Mexico	1	(0)
- * Club domestic league appearances and goals

Moisés Jinich Brook (15 December 1927 – 2 March 2015) was a Mexican football forward who was part of the Mexico national team roster for the 1954 FIFA World Cup. He also played for Atlante.
