= Norberto Anido =

Argentine footballer (1933–1985)

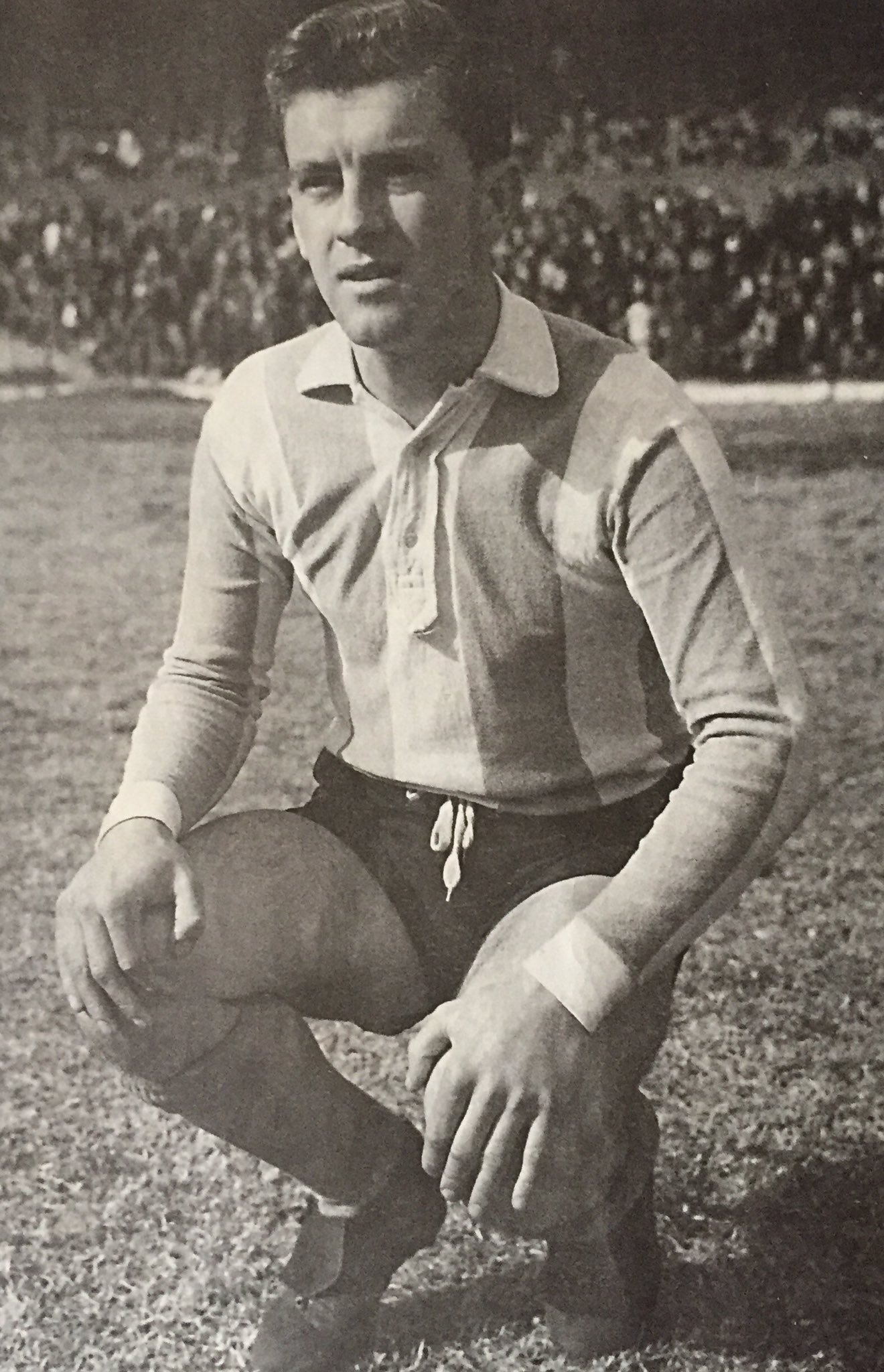

Personal information
- Date of birth: 2 September 1933
- Place of birth: Avellaneda, Argentina
- Date of death: 5 January 1985 (aged 51)
- Position: Defender

Senior career*
| Years | Team | Apps | (Gls) |
| 1958-1961 | Racing Club | | |

International career
| 1959 | Argentina | 3 | (0) |
- * Club domestic league appearances and goals

Norberto Anido (2 September 1933 – 5 January 1985) was an Argentine footballer. He played in three matches for the Argentina national football team in 1959. He was also part of Argentina's squad for the 1959 South American Championship that took place in Ecuador. Anido died on 5 January 1985, at the age of 51.
