= Juan Briezen =

Aruban footballer

Personal information
- Date of birth: 9 August 1928
- Date of death: 2007 (aged 78–79)
- Position: Forward

International career
Years	Team	Apps	(Gls)
- Netherlands Antilles

Juan Briezen (9 August 1928 – 2007) was an Arubian footballer who played as a striker. He competed in the men's tournament at the 1952 Summer Olympics. He scored Netherlands Antilles only ever goal in the Olympic Games, with a 79th minute effort in a 2–1 loss to Turkey in their first round clash in 1952.
