= Guillermo Krips =

Curaçaoan footballer

Personal information
- Full name: Guillermo Grigorio Krips
- Date of birth: 28 November 1929
- Date of death: before 23 December 2016
- Position: Forward

International career
Years	Team	Apps	(Gls)
- Netherlands Antilles

Guillermo Grigorio Krips, nicknamed Shon Mi (born 28 November 1929, died before 23 December 2016), was a Curaçaoan footballer. He competed in the men's tournament at the 1952 Summer Olympics.
