= Willys Heyliger =

Curaçaoan footballer (1926–2002)

Personal information
- Date of birth: 19 January 1926
- Place of birth: Saint Thomas, U.S. Virgin Islands
- Date of death: 23 February 2002 (aged 76)
- Place of death: Curaçao
- Position: Forward

International career
Years	Team	Apps	(Gls)
- Netherlands Antilles

Willys Desmond Heyliger (19 January 1926 – 23 February 2002) was a Curaçaoan footballer. He competed in the men's tournament at the 1952 Summer Olympics.
