= Eddy Vlinder =

Curaçaoan footballer

Personal information
- Full name: Edmundo Vlinder
- Date of birth: 6 February 1926
- Date of death: February 2009 (aged 82-83)
- Position: Defender

International career
Years	Team	Apps	(Gls)
- Netherlands Antilles

Edmundo Vlinder (6 February 1926 – February 2009) was a Curaçaoan footballer. He competed in the men's tournament at the 1952 Summer Olympics.
