= Moises Bicentini =

Curaçao football player and manager (1931–2007)

Personal information
- Date of birth: 27 December 1931
- Place of birth: Willemstad, Curaçao and Dependencies, Kingdom of the Netherlands
- Date of death: 25 April 2007 (aged 75)
- Position: Midfielder

Senior career*
Years	Team	Apps	(Gls)
–1957	SUBT		
1957–1961	NEC	93	(31)

International career
- Netherlands Antilles
- * Club domestic league appearances and goals

Moises Bicentini (27 December 1931 – 25 April 2007) was an association football player from Curaçao who played in the Netherlands for NEC between 1957 and 1961. His son was fellow player Remko Bicentini.
