= 1955 CCCF Championship =

Tournament details
- Host country: Honduras
- Dates: 14–29 August
- Teams: 7
- Venue(s): Estadio Tiburcio Carias Andino, Tegucigalpa

Final positions
- Champions: Costa Rica (5th title)
- Runners-up: Curaçao
- Third place: Honduras
- Fourth place: El Salvador

Tournament statistics
- Matches played: 15
- Goals scored: 51 (3.4 per match)
- Top scorer(s): (Costa Rica) Rodolfo Harrera (Costa Rica) Mario Murillo (El Salvador) Juan Francisco Barraza (four goals each)

The 1955 CCCF Championship was the seventh international association football championship for members of the Confederación Centroamericana y del Caribe de Fútbol (CCCF). Hosted by Honduras, the competition ran from 14–29 August 1955 and was contested by the national teams of Aruba, Costa Rica, Cuba, Curaçao, El Salvador, Guatemala and Honduras.

Guatemala withdrew after playing three matches following an on field incident in their match against Costa Rica. Their results were subsequently annulled from the competition. Defending champions Costa Rica won the competition for the fifth time. In the final matches of the round-robin tournament, they were crowned champions after completing a clean and winning all of their matches by defeating Honduras 2–1.

== Background ==
The Confederación Centroamericana y del Caribe de Fútbol (CCCF) was founded in 1938. Along with the North American Football Confederation (NAFC), it was a precursor organisation to the Confederation of North, Central America and Caribbean Association Football (CONCACAF). Within three years of its founding, the CCCF organised a contest for its member associations.

Costa Rica were the defending champions after regaining the trophy in 1953. They were the most successful team in the competition's history having won four of the six editions to date.

Panama attempted to enter the competition at the last minute but their attempt was rejected.

== Format ==
The tournament was played as a round-robin where each team would play all of the others once. The winner would be decided by the total number of points obtained across all matches played.

=== Participants ===
- (Netherlands) Aruba
- Costa Rica
- Cuba
- Curaçao
- El Salvador
- Guatemala
- Honduras (hosts)

== Venue ==
All matches were held at the Estadio Tiburcio Carias Andino in Tegucigalpa.

Tegucigalpa
Estadio Tiburcio Carias Andino
Capacity: 34,000
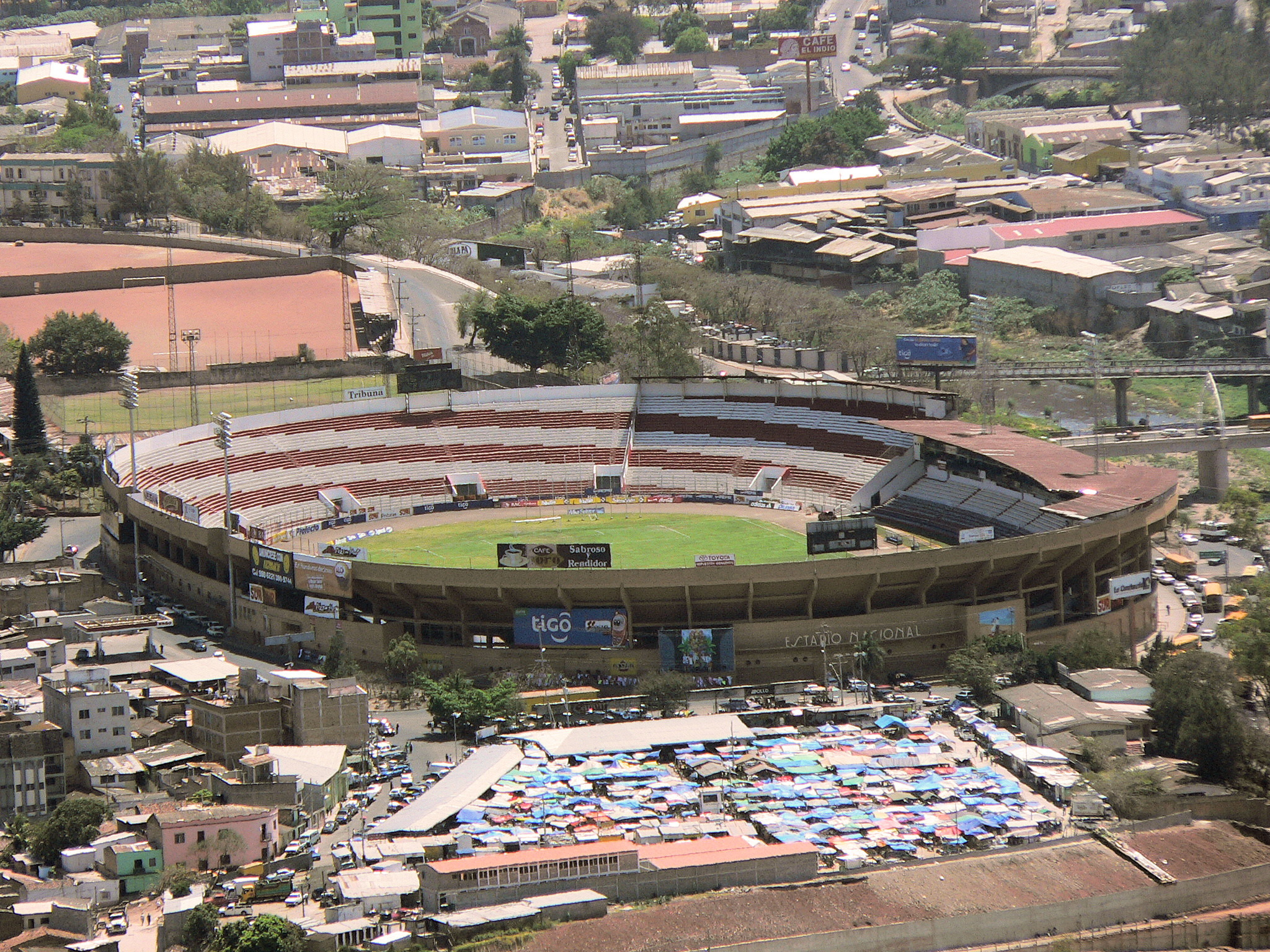

== Summary ==
The competition began on 14 August when Honduras recorded a 3–0 win against Cuba and Costa Rica narrowly defeated Cuba 3–2. The following day El Salvador defeated Guatemala 3–2. On 16 August, Rodolfo Herrera scored a brace as Costa Rica defeated Cuba 6–0 and Curaçao defeated rivals Aruba 2–1. The following day, Arnoldo Enamorado scored a brace as Honduras defeated El Salvador 3–1.

On 18 August, Guatemala recorded their first win of the competition as they defeated Curaçao 4–1. The following day, Costa Rica maintained their perfect start to the competition by defeating El Salvador 4–0 and Aruba earned their first win by defeating Cuba 5–1. On 20 August, Curaçao ended Honduras' unbeaten start after recording a 2–0 win against them. As a result, Costa Rica were top of the table on six points, two ahead of Curaçao and Honduras with almost half the fixtures completed.

The following day, El Salvador defeated Cuba 2–1. The competition changed when, with Costa Rica leading 2–0 against Guatemala after 70 minutes, a fight broke out between players which subsequently led to the abandonment of the match. As a result, Guatemala withdrew from the competition and the CCCF organising committee decided to award each of Guatemala's scheduled fixtures to their opponents (Aruba, Cuba and Honduras). Having lost to Guatemala earlier in the competition, Curaçao protested the decision and the CCCF consulted FIFA to reach a resolution.

Meanwhile, on 22 August, Honduras and Aruba drew 1–1. Two days later, Costa Rica maintained their flawless record with a 2–1 win against Curaçao and El Salvador defeated Aruba 2–0. With only three matches overall left to be played, Costa Rica were mathematically assured of finishing top of the table. However, on 25 August, the organising committee decided, as a result of their consultation with FIFA, to annul all of Guatemala's results. With Curaçao's defeat to Guatemala no longer counting towards the outcome of the competition, they could now catch Costa Rica and finish level on points with them.

On 26 August, Curaçao defeated El Salvador 3–0 to leave them two points behind Costa Rica with one match left to play. The final matches were played on 28 August and a Manuel Sosa own goal gave Costa Rica a 2–1 win against Honduras to claim the title. Curaçao defeated Cuba 2–0 to finish as runners-up.

== Table ==
Pos	Team	Pld	W	D	L	GF	GA	GD	Pts	Qualification
1	Costa Rica	5	5	0	0	17	4	+13	10	Champions
2	Curaçao	5	4	0	1	10	3	+7	8	
3	Honduras	5	2	1	2	8	6	+2	5	
4	El Salvador	5	2	0	3	5	11	−6	4	
5	(Netherlands) Aruba	5	1	1	3	9	9	0	3	
6	Cuba	5	0	0	5	2	18	−16	0	
7	Guatemala	0	0	0	0	0	0	0	0	Withdrew, results annulled

== Results ==
14 August 1955

Honduras	3–0	Cuba
Ramírez 8', 47'; Guererro 49'

Estadio Nacional Chelato Uclés, Tegucigalpa
14 August 1955

Costa Rica	3–2	(Netherlands) Aruba
Gobán 8'; Monge 51'; González 53'		Williams 62'; Jansen 67'

Estadio Nacional Chelato Uclés, Tegucigalpa

15 August 1955

Guatemala	2–3 (annulled)	El Salvador
L. Ruano 45', 47'		Barraza 17'; A. Ruano 20', 48'

Estadio Nacional Chelato Uclés, Tegucigalpa

16 August 1955

Cuba	0–6	Costa Rica
		Montero 4', 85'; Murillo 5'; Herrera 9', 64' (pen.); Ulloa 88'

Estadio Nacional Chelato Uclés, Tegucigalpa
16 August 1955

Aruba (Netherlands)	1–2	Curaçao
Brión 77' (pen.)		Bernardina 43'; Jansen 70'

Estadio Nacional Chelato Uclés, Tegucigalpa

17 August 1955

El Salvador	1–3	Honduras
Ruano 33'		Enamorado 39', 89'; J.Ramírez 69'

Estadio Nacional Chelato Uclés, Tegucigalpa

18 August 1955

Guatemala	4–1 (annulled)	Curaçao
Cordero 14', 50'; Víckles 29', 72'		Hato 2'

Estadio Nacional Chelato Uclés, Tegucigalpa

19 August 1955

Costa Rica	4–0	El Salvador
Cordero 16' (pen.); González 50'; Herrera 76', 85'

Estadio Nacional Chelato Uclés, Tegucigalpa
19 August 1955

Aruba (Netherlands)	5–1	Cuba
Rodríguez 1'; Jansen 2'; Williams 13'; Brokken 64', 71'		Antonio Gutiérrez 65'

Estadio Nacional Chelato Uclés, Tegucigalpa

20 August 1955

Curaçao	2–0	Honduras
Schoop 44'; Jansen 77'

Estadio Nacional Chelato Uclés, Tegucigalpa

21 August 1955

El Salvador	2–1	Cuba
Barraza 30', 80'		Alberto Gutiérrez 60'

Estadio Nacional Chelato Uclés, Tegucigalpa
21 August 1955

Guatemala	0–2 (annulled)	Costa Rica
		Murillo 48', 55'

Estadio Nacional Chelato Uclés, Tegucigalpa

22 August 1955

Honduras	1–1	(Netherlands) Aruba
Prince 68'		Rodríguez 22'

Estadio Nacional Chelato Uclés, Tegucigalpa

23 August 1955

Cuba	Cancelled	Guatemala

Estadio Nacional Chelato Uclés, Tegucigalpa

24 August 1955

Curaçao	1–2	Costa Rica
Quesada 90' (o.g.)		Murillo 30'; González 57'

Estadio Nacional Chelato Uclés, Tegucigalpa
24 August 1955

El Salvador	2–0	(Netherlands) Aruba
Valencia 8'		Barraza 63'

Estadio Nacional Chelato Uclés, Tegucigalpa

25 August 1955

Honduras	Cancelled	Guatemala

Estadio Nacional Chelato Uclés, Tegucigalpa

26 August 1955

Curaçao	3–0	El Salvador
Bicentini 26' (pen.); Schoop 80'; Jansen 87'

Estadio Nacional Chelato Uclés, Tegucigalpa

27 August 1955

Aruba (Netherlands)	Cancelled	Guatemala

Estadio Nacional Chelato Uclés, Tegucigalpa

28 August 1955

Costa Rica	2–1	Honduras
Monge 29'; Sosa 37' (o.g.)		Rivera 56'

Estadio Nacional Chelato Uclés, Tegucigalpa
28 August 1955

Cuba	0–2	Curaçao
		De Lannoy 48'; Schoop 63'

Estadio Nacional Chelato Uclés, Tegucigalpa
