= Pedro Matrona =

Curaçaoan footballer (1927–2019)

Personal information
- Full name: Pedro Basiano Matrona
- Date of birth: 9 December 1927
- Date of death: April 2019 (aged 91)
- Position: Defender

Senior career*
Years	Team	Apps	(Gls)
1945–1949	CRKSV Jong Holland		
1949–1951	SC Feijenoord		
1951–1952	PSV Willemstad		
1952–1960	CRKSV Jong Holland		

International career
- Netherlands Antilles
- * Club domestic league appearances and goals

Pedro Basiano Matrona (9 December 1927 – April 2019) was a Curaçaoan footballer. He competed in the men's tournament at the 1952 Summer Olympics.
