= Wilhelm Canword =

Curaçaoan former footballer

Personal information
- Date of birth: 11 July 1932 (age 94)
- Position: Defender

International career
Years	Team	Apps	(Gls)
- Netherlands Antilles

Wilhelm Rudolf Canword (born 11 July 1932) is a Curaçaoan former footballer. He competed in the men's tournament at the 1952 Summer Olympics.
