= Wilfred de Lanoi =

Curaçaoan footballer

Personal information
- Full name: Wilfred Modesto de Lanoi
- Date of birth: 12 February 1929
- Date of death: 13 June 2008 (aged 79)
- Position: Defender

International career
Years	Team	Apps	(Gls)
- Netherlands Antilles

Wilfred Modesto de Lanoi, nicknamed Fèfè (12 February 1929 – 13 June 2008), was a Curaçaoan footballer. He competed in the men's tournament at the 1952 Summer Olympics.
