= Guillermo Giribaldi =

Curaçaoan footballer (1929–2001)

Personal information
- Full name: Guillermo Bruno Victorino Giribaldi
- Date of birth: 17 May 1929
- Place of birth: Curaçao
- Date of death: 19 January 2001 (aged 71)
- Place of death: Curaçao
- Position: Midfielder

International career
Years	Team	Apps	(Gls)
- Netherlands Antilles

Guillermo Bruno Victorino Giribaldi, nicknamed Gein (17 May 1929 – 19 January 2001), was a Curaçaoan footballer. He competed in the men's tournament at the 1952 Summer Olympics.
