= Guatemala national football team results =

The following are the Guatemala national football team statistical results.

== Head-to-head record against other nations ==
Updated to 5 October 2026 after the match against Suriname.

Positive Record Neutral Record Negative Record

Opponent	Pld	W	D	L	GF	GA	GD
Algeria	1	0	0	1	0	7	−7
Anguilla	2	2	0	0	15	0	+15
Antigua and Barbuda	8	7	0	1	29	3	+26
Argentina	4	0	0	4	1	17	−16
Armenia	2	0	1	1	2	8	−6
Barbados	3	2	1	0	5	1	+4
Belize	13	9	4	0	23	10	+13
Bermuda	6	2	4	0	4	2	+2
Bolivia	5	3	1	1	7	5	+2
Brazil	2	0	1	1	1	4	−3
British Virgin Islands	2	2	0	0	6	0	+6
Canada	16	2	4	10	11	23	−12
Chile	5	1	1	3	4	9	−5
Colombia	6	1	2	3	8	15	−7
Costa Rica	67	17	18	32	78	131	−53
Cuba	20	10	7	3	25	13	+12
Curaçao (Note: Includes matches against the Netherlands Antilles.)	12	3	7	2	24	19	+5
Czech Republic	1	0	0	1	1	3	−2
Dominica	1	1	0	0	6	0	+6
Dominican Republic	4	2	2	0	7	3	+4
Ecuador	11	2	3	6	4	14	−10
El Salvador	90	40	27	23	110	75	+35
French Guiana	2	1	0	1	4	2	+2
Grenada	3	3	0	0	11	1	+10
Guadeloupe	3	2	1	0	7	5	+2
Guyana	8	7	0	1	25	4	+21
Haiti	17	10	2	5	27	17	+10
Honduras	52	14	18	20	58	61	−3
Iceland	1	0	0	1	0	1	−1
Iran	1	0	1	0	2	2	0
Iraq	1	0	0	1	0	3	−3
Israel	2	0	1	1	0	7	−7
Italy	1	0	0	1	2	5	−3
Jamaica	23	5	5	13	22	37	−15
Japan	2	0	0	2	1	5	−4
Martinique	1	1	0	0	3	1	+2
Mexico	37	4	10	23	28	70	−42
Nicaragua	28	21	5	2	74	18	+56
Norway	1	0	0	1	1	3	−2
Panama	44	13	12	19	65	67	−2
Paraguay	11	0	2	9	10	25	−15
Peru	4	0	1	3	2	8	−6
Poland	2	0	1	1	2	3	−1
Puerto Rico	4	4	0	0	15	1	+14
Qatar	1	0	0	1	0	2	−2
Russia (Note: Includes matches against the Soviet Union.)	1	0	0	1	0	3	−3
Saint Lucia	2	2	0	0	9	1	+8
Saint Vincent and the Grenadines	6	6	0	0	33	3	+30
South Africa	2	0	1	1	1	6	−5
South Korea	3	1	1	1	3	4	−1
Suriname	9	4	4	1	14	9	+5
Slovakia	1	0	0	1	0	1	−1
Thailand	1	1	0	0	4	1	+3
Trinidad and Tobago	27	8	9	10	43	37	+6
United States	28	5	6	17	20	49	−29
Uruguay	3	0	1	2	3	8	−5
Venezuela	9	2	2	5	9	11	−2
Zambia	1	0	0	1	0	4	−4
Total	624	220	166	238	869	847	+22

== Key ==
Key to matches

- Att. = Match attendance
- (H) = Home ground
- (A) = Away ground
- (N) = Neutral venue
- — = Match attendance not known

Key to record by opponent

- P = Games played
- W = Games won
- D = Games drawn
- L = Games lost
- GF = Goals for
- GA = Goals against

== Results 1921 - 1950 ==
Date	Location	Opponents	Score^{[A]}	Competition
14 September 1921	Guatemala City	Honduras	10 – 1	Friendly
18 September 1921	Guatemala City	Costa Rica	0 – 6	Friendly
9 December 1923	Mexico City	Mexico	1 – 2	Friendly
12 December 1923	Mexico City	Mexico	0 – 2	Friendly
16 December 1923	Mexico City	Mexico	3 – 3	Friendly
16 March 1930	(Cuba) La Habana	Costa Rica	1 – 8	1930 Central American and Caribbean Games
18 March 1930	(Cuba) La Habana	El Salvador	2 – 8	1930 Central American and Caribbean Games
24 March 1935	(El Salvador) San Salvador	Costa Rica	3 – 4	1935 Central American and Caribbean Games
26 March 1935	(El Salvador) San Salvador	Cuba	1 – 2	1935 Central American and Caribbean Games
28 March 1935	(El Salvador) San Salvador	Mexico	1 – 5	1935 Central American and Caribbean Games
30 March 1935	(El Salvador) San Salvador	Honduras	0 – 0	1935 Central American and Caribbean Games
1 April 1935	(El Salvador) San Salvador	El Salvador	1 – 6	1935 Central American and Caribbean Games
4 December 1943	(El Salvador) San Salvador	El Salvador	2 – 2	1943 CCCF Championship
6 December 1943	(El Salvador) San Salvador	Costa Rica	3 – 2	1943 CCCF Championship
8 December 1943	(El Salvador) San Salvador	Nicaragua	6 – 2	1943 CCCF Championship
11 December 1943	(El Salvador) San Salvador	El Salvador	1 – 2	1943 CCCF Championship
15 December 1943	(El Salvador) San Salvador	Costa Rica	4 – 2	1943 CCCF Championship
18 December 1943	(El Salvador) San Salvador	Nicaragua	5 – 1	1943 CCCF Championship
22 February 1946	(Costa Rica) San José	El Salvador	3 – 1	1946 CCCF Championship
27 February 1946	(Costa Rica) San José	Honduras	3 – 5	1946 CCCF Championship
6 March 1946	(Costa Rica) San José	Nicaragua	7 – 0	1946 CCCF Championship
9 March 1946	(Costa Rica) San José	Costa Rica	4 – 1	1946 CCCF Championship
12 March 1946	(Costa Rica) San José	Panama	3 – 3	1946 CCCF Championship
8 December 1946	(Colombia) Barranquilla	Panama	2 – 4	1946 Central American and Caribbean Games
10 December 1946	(Colombia) Barranquilla	Curaçao	2 – 2	1946 Central American and Caribbean Games
15 December 1946	(Colombia) Barranquilla	Costa Rica	0 – 6	1946 Central American and Caribbean Games
18 December 1946	(Colombia) Barranquilla	Puerto Rico	4 – 1	1946 Central American and Caribbean Games
22 December 1946	(Colombia) Barranquilla	Venezuela	2 – 3	1946 Central American and Caribbean Games
1 March 1948	Guatemala City	El Salvador	3 – 0	1948 CCCF Championship
3 March 1948	Guatemala City	Costa Rica	1 – 1	1948 CCCF Championship
5 March 1948	Guatemala City	Netherlands Antilles	2 – 2	1948 CCCF Championship
8 March 1948	Guatemala City	Panama	4 – 3	1948 CCCF Championship
12 March 1948	Guatemala City	El Salvador	1 – 1	1948 CCCF Championship
15 March 1948	Guatemala City	Costa Rica	3 – 2	1948 CCCF Championship
17 March 1948	Guatemala City	Netherlands Antilles	2 – 2	1948 CCCF Championship
20 March 1948	Guatemala City	Panama	4 – 5	1948 CCCF Championship
5 August 1949	(Netherlands Antilles) Willemstad	Netherlands Antilles	1 – 1	Friendly
26 February 1950	Guatemala City	Colombia	2 – 1	1950 Central American and Caribbean Games
3 March 1950	Guatemala City	Honduras	0 – 1	1950 Central American and Caribbean Games
11 March 1950	Guatemala City	Curaçao	0 – 2	1950 Central American and Caribbean Games
13 March 1950	Guatemala City	El Salvador	2 – 0	1950 Central American and Caribbean Games

== Results 1953 - 1957 ==
Date	Location	Opponents	Score^{[A]}	Competition
8 March 1953	(Costa Rica) San José	Netherlands Antilles	1 – 1	1953 CCCF Championship
12 March 1953	(Costa Rica) San José	El Salvador	3 – 2	1953 CCCF Championship
16 March 1953	(Costa Rica) San José	Panama	2 – 2	1953 CCCF Championship
18 March 1953	(Costa Rica) San José	Nicaragua	1 – 0	1953 CCCF Championship
24 July 1955	(Costa Rica) San José	Costa Rica	1 – 9	Friendly
14 August 1955	(Honduras) Tegucigalpa	Nicaragua	2 – 3	1955 CCCF Championship
17 August 1955	(Honduras) Tegucigalpa	Netherlands Antilles	4 – 1	1955 CCCF Championship
20 August 1955	(Honduras) Tegucigalpa	Costa Rica	0 – 2	1955 CCCF Championship
22 August 1955	(Honduras) Tegucigalpa	Cuba	0 – 1	1955 CCCF Championship
24 August 1955	(Honduras) Tegucigalpa	Honduras	0 – 1	1955 CCCF Championship
10 February 1957	Guatemala City	Costa Rica	2 – 6	1958 FIFA World Cup qualification
17 February 1957	(Costa Rica) San José	Costa Rica	1 – 3	1958 FIFA World Cup qualification
14 March 1957	Guatemala City	Netherlands Antilles	1 – 3	1958 FIFA World Cup qualification

== Results 1960 - 1969 ==
Date	Location	Opponents	Score^{[A]}	Competition
20 August 1960	(Costa Rica) San José	Costa Rica	2 – 3	1962 FIFA World Cup qualification
27 August 1960	Guatemala City	Costa Rica	4 – 4	1962 FIFA World Cup qualification
24 September 1960	(Honduras) Tegucigalpa	Honduras	1 – 1	1962 FIFA World Cup qualification
1 October 1960	Guatemala City	Honduras	0 – 2	1962 FIFA World Cup qualification
1 March 1961	(Costa Rica) San José	Costa Rica	2 – 4	1961 CCCF Championship
6 March 1961	(Costa Rica) San José	Panama	2 – 0	1961 CCCF Championship
8 March 1961	(Costa Rica) San José	Cuba	2 – 0	1961 CCCF Championship
10 March 1961	(Costa Rica) San José	Haiti	1 – 3	1961 CCCF Championship
2 March 1963	Guatemala City	Honduras	2 – 1	Friendly
10 March 1963	Guatemala City	Honduras	1 – 2	Friendly
22 March 1963	(El Salvador) San Salvador	Panama	2 – 2	1963 CONCACAF Championship
26 March 1963	(El Salvador) San Salvador	Nicaragua	3 – 1	1963 CONCACAF Championship

== Results 2010 - 2019 ==
Date	Location	Opponents	Score^{[A]}	Competition
3 March 2010	(United States) Washington, D.C.	El Salvador	2 – 1	Friendly
30 May 2010	(South Africa) Polokwane	South Africa	0 – 5 (Note: The match was refereed by Ibrahim Chaibou of Niger. FIFA conducted an investigation into several friendlies officiated by Chaibou in the late 2000s and early 2010s, concluding that he had received bribes to fix many of those matches, which included the South Africa v Guatemala game as well as a match between Nigeria and Argentina in June 2011, among others. As a result, FIFA banned him for life and imposed a heavy fine.)	Friendly
3 September 2010	(United States) Fort Lauderdale	Nicaragua	5 – 0	Friendly
7 September 2010	(Japan) Osaka	Japan	1 – 2	Friendly
8 October 2010	(Guatemala) Puerto San José	Belize	4 – 2	Friendly
12 October 2010	(United States) Los Angeles	Honduras	0 – 2	Friendly
16 November 2010	(United States) Kennesaw	Guyana	3 – 0	Friendly
16 January 2011	Panama City	Costa Rica	0 – 2	2011 Copa Centroamericana
18 January 2011	Panama City	Honduras	1 – 3	2011 Copa Centroamericana
21 January 2011	Panama City	Nicaragua	2 – 1	2011 Copa Centroamericana
28 March 2011	(Guatemala) Mazatenango	Bolivia	1 – 1	Friendly
31 May 2011	Guatemala City	Venezuela	0 – 2	Friendly
6 June 2011	(United States) Los Angeles	Honduras	0 – 0	2011 CONCACAF Gold Cup
10 June 2011	(United States) Miami	Jamaica	0 – 2	2011 CONCACAF Gold Cup
10 June 2011	(United States) Harrison	Grenada	4 – 0	2011 CONCACAF Gold Cup
18 June 2011	(United States) East Rutherford	Mexico	1 – 2	2011 CONCACAF Gold Cup
2 September 2011	Guatemala City	Saint Vincent and the Grenadines	4 – 0	2014 FIFA World Cup qualification
6 September 2011	(Belize) Belmopan	Belize	2 – 1	2014 FIFA World Cup qualification
7 October 2011	(Saint Vincent and the Grenadines) Kingstown	Saint Vincent and the Grenadines	3 – 0	2014 FIFA World Cup qualification
11 October 2011	Guatemala City	Belize	3 – 1	2014 FIFA World Cup qualification
11 November 2011	Guatemala City	Grenada	3 – 0	2014 FIFA World Cup qualification
15 November 2011	(Grenada) Saint George	Grenada	4 – 1	2014 FIFA World Cup qualification
22 February 2012	(Paraguay) Luque	Paraguay	1 – 2	Friendly
28 February 2012	(Guyana) Georgetown	Guyana	2 – 0	Friendly
25 April 2012	Guatemala City	Paraguay	0 – 1	Friendly
26 May 2012	(Costa Rica) San José	Costa Rica	2 – 3	Friendly
1 June 2012	Guatemala City	Costa Rica	1 – 0	Friendly
8 June 2012	(Jamaica) Kingston	Jamaica	1 – 2	2014 FIFA World Cup qualification
12 June 2012	Guatemala City	United States	1 – 1	2014 FIFA World Cup qualification
10 August 2012	(United States) Los Angeles	El Salvador	0 – 1	Friendly
15 August 2012	(United States) Washington, D.C.	Paraguay	3 – 3	Friendly
7 September 2012	Guatemala City	Antigua and Barbuda	3 – 1	2014 FIFA World Cup qualification
11 September 2012	(Antigua and Barbuda) St. John's	Antigua and Barbuda	1 – 0	2014 FIFA World Cup qualification
12 October 2012	Guatemala City	Jamaica	2 – 1	2014 FIFA World Cup qualification
16 October 2012	(United States) Kansas City	United States	1 – 3	2014 FIFA World Cup qualification
14 November 2012	(Paraguay) Luque	Paraguay	1 – 3	Friendly
10 January 2013	Panama City	Panama	0 – 3	Friendly
13 January 2013	Panama City	Panama	0 – 2	Friendly
18 January 2013	(Costa Rica) San José	Nicaragua	1 – 1	2013 Copa Centroamericana
20 January 2013	(Costa Rica) San José	Belize	0 – 0	2013 Copa Centroamericana
22 January 2013	(Costa Rica) San José	Costa Rica	1 – 1	2013 Copa Centroamericana
25 January 2013	(Costa Rica) San José	Panama	1 – 3	2013 Copa Centroamericana
6 February 2013	(United States) Miami	Colombia	1 – 4	Friendly
11 June 2013	(Guatemala) Antigua	Belize	0 – 0	Friendly
14 June 2013	Guatemala City	Argentina	0 – 4	Friendly
4 July 2013	(United States) San Diego	United States	0 – 6	Friendly
6 September 2013	(Japan) Osaka	Japan	0 – 3	Friendly
14 August 2013	(Guatemala) Antigua	Nicaragua	3 – 0	Friendly
23 August 2013	Guatemala City	Cuba	1 – 0	Friendly
3 September 2014	(United States) Washington, D.C.	El Salvador	2 – 1	2014 Copa Centroamericana
7 September 2014	(United States) Dallas	Belize	2 – 1	2014 Copa Centroamericana
10 September 2014	(United States) Houston	Honduras	2 – 0	2014 Copa Centroamericana
13 September 2014	(United States) Los Angeles	Costa Rica	1 – 2	2014 Copa Centroamericana
14 October 2014	(Peru) Lima	Peru	0 – 1	Friendly
27 March 2015	(United States) Carson	Canada	0 – 1	Friendly
31 March 2015	(United States) Fort Lauderdale	El Salvador	0 – 0	Friendly
30 May 2015	(Mexico) Tuxtla Gutierrez	Mexico	0 – 3	Friendly
6 June 2015	(Uruguay) Montevideo	Uruguay	1 – 5	Friendly
12 June 2015	Guatemala City	Bermuda	0 – 0	2018 FIFA World Cup qualification
15 June 2015	(Bermuda) Hamilton	Bermuda	1 – 0	2018 FIFA World Cup qualification
3 July 2015	(United States) Nashville	United States	0 – 4	Friendly
9 July 2015	(United States) Chicago	Trinidad and Tobago	1 – 3	2015 CONCACAF Gold Cup
12 July 2015	(United States) Phoenix	Mexico	0 – 0	2015 CONCACAF Gold Cup
15 July 2015	(United States) Charlotte	Cuba	0 – 1	2015 CONCACAF Gold Cup
4 September 2015	(Antigua and Barbuda) St. John's	Antigua and Barbuda	0 – 1	2018 FIFA World Cup qualification
8 September 2015	Guatemala City	Antigua and Barbuda	2 – 0	2018 FIFA World Cup qualification
8 October 2015	(Honduras) Tegucigalpa	Honduras	1 – 1	Friendly
13 November 2015	Guatemala City	Trinidad and Tobago	1 – 2	2018 FIFA World Cup qualification
17 November 2015	(Saint Vincent and the Grenadines) Kingstown	Saint Vincent and the Grenadines	4 – 0	2018 FIFA World Cup qualification
9 February 2016	Guatemala City	Honduras	3 – 1	Friendly
2 March 2016	Guatemala City	El Salvador	1 – 0	Friendly
25 March 2016	Guatemala City	United States	2 – 0	2018 FIFA World Cup qualification
29 March 2016	(United States) Columbus	United States	0 – 4	2018 FIFA World Cup qualification
28 May 2016	(United States) Los Angeles	Armenia	1 – 7	Friendly
1 June 2016	(United States) Fort Lauderdale	Venezuela	1 – 1	Friendly
10 August 2016	Panama City	Panama	0 – 0	Friendly
2 September 2016	(Trinidad and Tobago) Port of Spain	Trinidad and Tobago	2 – 2	2018 FIFA World Cup qualification
6 September 2016	Guatemala City	Saint Vincent and the Grenadines	9 – 3	2018 FIFA World Cup qualification
15 August 2018	Guatemala City	Cuba	1 – 0	Friendly
18 August 2018	(Guatemala) Quetzaltenango	Cuba	3 – 0	Friendly
7 September 2018	(United States) Los Angeles	Argentina	0 – 3	Friendly
11 September 2018	(United States) Chicago	Ecuador	0 – 2	Friendly
15 November 2018	(Israel) Netanya	Israel	0 – 7	Friendly
6 March 2019	(United States) Los Angeles	El Salvador	1 – 3	Friendly
22 March 2019	Guatemala City	Costa Rica	1 – 0	Friendly
26 March 2019	(Nicaragua) Managua	Nicaragua	1 – 0	Friendly
9 June 2019	(Paraguay) Asunción	Paraguay	0 – 2	Friendly
14 August 2019	(Dominican Republic) Santiago de los Caballeros	Dominican Republic	0 – 0	Friendly
5 September 2019	Guatemala City	Anguilla	10 – 0	2019–20 CONCACAF Nations League C
10 September 2019	(Puerto Rico) Mayagüez	Puerto Rico	5 – 0	2019–20 CONCACAF Nations League C
12 October 2019	(Anguilla) The Valley	Anguilla	5 – 0	2019–20 CONCACAF Nations League C
15 October 2019	(Bermuda) Hamilton	Bermuda	0 – 0	Friendly
16 November 2019	Guatemala City	Puerto Rico	5 – 0	2019–20 CONCACAF Nations League C
19 November 2019	(Guatemala) Coatepeque	Antigua and Barbuda	8 – 0	Friendly

== Results 2020 - 2029 ==
Date	Location	Opponents	Score^{[A]}	Competition
4 March 2020	Guatemala City	Panama	0 – 2	Friendly
30 September 2020	Mexico City	Mexico	0 – 3	Friendly
6 October 2020	(Nicaragua) Managua	Nicaragua	0 – 0	Friendly
14 November 2020	Guatemala City	Honduras	2 – 1	Friendly
22 January 2021	Guatemala City	Puerto Rico	1 – 0	Friendly
24 February 2021	Guatemala City	Nicaragua	1 – 0	Friendly
24 March 2021	Guatemala City	Cuba	1 – 0	2022 FIFA World Cup qualification
27 March 2021	(Curaçao) Willemstad	British Virgin Islands	3 – 0	2022 FIFA World Cup qualification
4 June 2021	Guatemala City	Saint Vincent and the Grenadines	10 – 0	2022 FIFA World Cup qualification
8 June 2021	(Curaçao) Willemstad	Curaçao	0 – 0	2022 FIFA World Cup qualification
26 June 2021	(United States) Los Angeles	El Salvador	0 – 0	Friendly
2 July 2021	(United States) Fort Lauderdale	Guyana	4 – 0	2021 CONCACAF Gold Cup qualification
6 July 2021	(United States) Fort Lauderdale	Guadeloupe	1 – 1	2021 CONCACAF Gold Cup qualification
11 July 2021	(United States) Frisco	El Salvador	0 – 2	2021 CONCACAF Gold Cup
14 July 2021	(United States) Dallas	Mexico	0 – 3	2021 CONCACAF Gold Cup
18 July 2021	(United States) Dallas	Trinidad and Tobago	1 – 1	2021 CONCACAF Gold Cup
8 September 2021	(Guatemala) Antigua	Nicaragua	2 – 2	Friendly
24 September 2021	(United States) Washington D.C.	El Salvador	2 – 0	Friendly
24 March 2022	(Guatemala) Antigua	Cuba	1 – 0	Friendly
27 March 2022	(United States) Fort Lauderdale	Haiti	2 – 1	Friendly
24 April 2022	(United States) San Jose	El Salvador	4 – 0	Friendly
27 April 2022	(United States) Orlando	Mexico	0 – 0	Friendly
2 June 2022	(French Guiana) Cayenne	French Guiana	0 – 2	2022–23 CONCACAF Nations League B
5 June 2022	Guatemala City	Belize	2 – 0	2022–23 CONCACAF Nations League B
10 June 2022	(Dominican Republic) Santo Domingo	Dominican Republic	1 – 1	2022–23 CONCACAF Nations League B
13 June 2022	Guatemala City	Dominican Republic	2 – 0	2022–23 CONCACAF Nations League B
24 September 2022	(United States) Harrison	Colombia	1 – 4	Friendly
27 September 2022	(United States) Houston	Honduras	1 – 2	Friendly
23 October 2022	(Spain) Málaga	Qatar	0 – 2	Friendly
19 November 2022	(United States) Carson	Nicaragua	3 – 1	Friendly
12 March 2023	(United States) San Jose	Panama	1 – 1	Friendly
24 March 2023	(Belize) Belmopan	Belize	2 – 1	2022–23 CONCACAF Nations League B
27 March 2023	Guatemala City	French Guiana	4 – 0	2022–23 CONCACAF Nations League B
7 June 2023	(Mexico) Mazatlán	Mexico	0 – 2	Friendly
11 June 2023	(United States) Chester	Trinidad and Tobago	0 – 1	Friendly
15 June 2023	(United States) Carson	Costa Rica	1 – 0	Friendly
18 June 2023	(United States) East Hartford	Venezuela	0 – 1	Friendly
27 June 2023	(United States) Fort Lauderdale	Cuba	1 – 0	2023 CONCACAF Gold Cup
1 July 2023	(United States) Houston	Canada	0 – 0	2023 CONCACAF Gold Cup
4 July 2023	(United States) Harrison	Guadeloupe	3 – 2	2023 CONCACAF Gold Cup
9 July 2023	(United States) Cincinnati	Jamaica	0 – 1	2023 CONCACAF Gold Cup
3 September 2023	(United States) Fort Lauderdale	Honduras	0 – 0	Friendly
7 September 2023	Guatemala City	El Salvador	2 – 0	2023–24 CONCACAF Nations League A
10 September 2023	Guatemala City	Panama	1 – 1	2023–24 CONCACAF Nations League A
13 October 2023	(Trinidad and Tobago) Port of Spain	Trinidad and Tobago	2 – 3	2023–24 CONCACAF Nations League A
17 October 2023	Panama City	Panama	0 – 3	2023–24 CONCACAF Nations League A
11 November 2023	(United States) Harrison	Jamaica	0 – 0	Friendly
13 January 2024	(United States) Fort Lauderdale	Iceland	0 – 1	Friendly
21 March 2024	(United States) Harrison	Ecuador	0 – 2	Friendly
24 March 2024	(United States) Houston	Venezuela	0 – 0	Friendly
26 May 2024	(United States) San Jose	Nicaragua	1 – 1	Friendly
5 June 2024	Guatemala City	Dominica	6 – 0	2026 FIFA World Cup qualification
8 June 2024	(British Virgin Islands) Road Town	British Virgin Islands	3 – 0	2026 FIFA World Cup qualification
14 June 2024	(United States) Landover	Argentina	1 – 4	Friendly
27 July 2024	(United States) Carson	El Salvador	0 – 1	Friendly
1 September 2024	(United States) Fort Lauderdale	Uruguay A'	1 – 1	Friendly
5 September 2024	Guatemala City	Martinique	3 – 1	2024–25 CONCACAF Nations League A
9 September 2024	Guatemala City	Costa Rica	0 – 0	2024–25 CONCACAF Nations League A
11 October 2024	(Guyana) Leonora	Guyana	3 – 1	2024–25 CONCACAF Nations League A
15 October 2024	(Costa Rica) San José	Costa Rica	0 – 3	2024–25 CONCACAF Nations League A
16 March 2025	(United States) Fort Lauderdale	Honduras	2 – 1	Friendly
21 March 2025	(Barbados) Bridgetown	Guyana	2 – 3	2025 CONCACAF Gold Cup qualification
25 March 2025	Guatemala City	Guyana	2 – 0	2025 CONCACAF Gold Cup qualification
31 May 2025	(United States) Chattanooga	El Salvador	1 – 1	Friendly
6 June 2025	Guatemala City	Dominican Republic	4 – 2	2026 FIFA World Cup qualification
10 June 2025	(Jamaica) Kingston	Jamaica	0 – 3	2026 FIFA World Cup qualification
16 June 2025	(United States) Carson	Jamaica	1 – 0	2025 CONCACAF Gold Cup
20 June 2025	(United States) Austin	Panama	0 – 1	2025 CONCACAF Gold Cup
24 June 2025	(United States) Houston	Guadeloupe	3 – 2	2025 CONCACAF Gold Cup
29 June 2025	(United States) Minneapolis	Canada	1 – 1	2025 CONCACAF Gold Cup
2 July 2025	(United States) St. Louis	United States	1 – 2	2025 CONCACAF Gold Cup
4 September 2025	Guatemala City	El Salvador	0 – 1	2026 FIFA World Cup qualification
8 September 2025	Panama City	Panama	1 – 1	2026 FIFA World Cup qualification
10 October 2025	(Suriname) Paramaribo	Suriname	1 – 1	2026 FIFA World Cup qualification
14 October 2025	(El Salvador) San Salvador	El Salvador	1 – 0	2026 FIFA World Cup qualification
13 November 2025	Guatemala City	Panama	2 – 3	2026 FIFA World Cup qualification
18 November 2025	Guatemala City	Suriname	3 – 1	2026 FIFA World Cup qualification
17 January 2026	(United States) Los Angeles	Canada	0 – 1	Friendly
27 March 2026	(Italy) Genoa	Algeria	0 – 7	Friendly
4 June 2026	(United States) Harrison	Czech Republic	1 – 3	Friendly
7 June 2026	(United States) Columbus	Ecuador	0 – 3	Friendly
25 September 2026	(Jamaica) Kingston	Jamaica	2 – 3	2026–27 CONCACAF Nations League A
28 September 2026	Guatemala City	El Salvador	6 – 0	2026–27 CONCACAF Nations League A
2 October 2026	(Suriname) Paramaribo	Suriname	0 – 0	2026–27 CONCACAF Nations League A
5 October 2026	Guatemala City	Suriname	1 – 0	2026–27 CONCACAF Nations League A
