= El Salvador–Honduras football rivalry =

International football rivalry

- Sport: Association football
- Location: Central America
- Teams: El Salvador; Honduras
- First meeting: 7 November 1927; Friendly; Honduras 1–0 El Salvador
- Latest meeting: 21 June 2025; 2025 CONCACAF Gold Cup; Honduras 2–0 El Salvador

Statistics
- All-time record: 18–22–40
- Largest victory: 7 December 1928; Friendly; El Salvador 5–0 Honduras 2 September 2000; 2002 World Cup qualification Honduras 5–0 El Salvador
- Longest win streak: Honduras 5 (1998–2000)
- Longest unbeaten streak: Honduras 12 (1996–2001)
- Current win streak: Honduras 1
- Current unbeaten streak: Honduras 3

The El Salvador–Honduras football rivalry is a sports rivalry between the El Salvador and Honduras national football teams. The rivalry between the two nations peaked in 1969 when both teams played each other in the 1970 FIFA World Cup qualifiers, and the matches they played between each other, which ultimately saw El Salvador advance to the 1970 FIFA World Cup, were a contributing factor which led to the outbreak of the Football War in July 1969.

== History ==
The national teams of El Salvador and Honduras were both established in 1921 and played their first matches in the Independence Centenary Games hosted in Guatemala City, however, El Salvador was defeated 0–7 by Costa Rica and Honduras was defeated 0–9 by Guatemala, and as a result, neither team faced each other during the tournament.

El Salvador and Honduras first played each other on 7 November 1928 in Tegucigalpa, in which Honduras won 1–0. The teams rematched the following day, which ended in a 0–0 draw. El Salvador's first victory came in their next match in San Salvador, where the Salvadorans defeated the Hondurans by a score of 5–0. The 5-score margin of victory remains the largest margin of victory ever between the two teams, and the feat was repeated in 2000 when Honduras defeated El Salvador 5–0 during the 2002 FIFA World Cup qualifiers. El Salvador had never beaten Honduras in Honduran soil until 2022, when El Salvador gained their first ever win to Honduras away in the 2022 FIFA World Cup qualification.

=== Football War ===
The two teams met during the 1970 FIFA World Cup qualifiers, the first time the two teams ever met in a tournament organized by FIFA. The teams played the first match in Tegucigalpa on 8 June 1969, in which Honduras won 1–0, which led to riots instigated by Salvadoran fans. In the second match in San Salvador on 15 June 1969, El Salvador won by a score of 3–0, and before the match, a rag was flown instead of the flag of Honduras. Honduran player Enrique Cardona stated that the Hondurans were "lucky that we lost" because otherwise "we wouldn't be alive today." The loss led to Hondurans attacking Salvadorans and burning down their homes, forcing many Salvadorans to flee back to El Salvador.

As both teams ended on equal points, a third match was played in neutral territory in Mexico City. El Salvador eventually won the match 3–2 after extra time. Before the match and because of the attacks against Salvadorans by Hondurans, the Salvadoran government severed diplomatic relations with Honduras on 26 June 1969, and on 14 July 1969, the Armed Forces of El Salvador invaded Honduras, beginning the Football War. After four days of fighting, the Organization of American States (OAS) negotiated a cease fire, ending the war after around 3,000 people, mostly civilians, had died. El Salvador withdrew its soldiers on 2 August 1969.

El Salvador qualified for the 1970 FIFA World Cup after defeating Haiti, however, the team would lose all three of its matches against Mexico, the Soviet Union, and Belgium in the group stage, failing to score a single goal.

== Major tournament matches ==
=== 1946 CCCF Championship ===
9 March 1946

Honduras	1–3	El Salvador
? (?)		Gutiérrez (?)

Estadio Nacional, San José, Costa Rica

=== 1953 CCCF Championship ===
15 March 1953

El Salvador	0–3	Honduras
		Ramírez 7', 40'; Padilla (?)

Estadio Nacional, San José, Costa Rica
Referee: William Crawford (England)

=== 1955 CCCF Championship ===
17 August 1955

Honduras	3–1	El Salvador
Enamorado 39', 89'; Ramírez Godoy 69'		Ruano 33'

Estadio Nacional, Tegucigalpa, Honduras
Referee: Reginald Leafe (England)

=== 1961 CCCF Championship ===
12 March 1961

El Salvador	1–0	Honduras
Barraza 3'

19 March 1961

El Salvador	5–1	Honduras
Merlos 30', 60'; Ruano 55'; Monge 71', 85'		Rodríguez 25'

=== 1963 CONCACAF Championship ===
27 March 1963

El Salvador	2–2	Honduras
Reynosa 30'; Hernández 65'		Guerra 16'; Suazo 27'

Estadio Nacional Flor Blanca, San Salvador, El Salvador
Referee: Saúl de la Rosa (Colombia)

5 April 1963

El Salvador	3–0	Honduras
Monge 10'; Hernández 13', 34'

Estadio Nacional Flor Blanca, San Salvador, El Salvador
Attendance: 35,000
Referee: Saúl de la Rosa (Colombia)

=== 1970 FIFA World Cup qualifiers ===
8 June 1969

Honduras	1–0	El Salvador
Wells 89'

Estadio Tiburcio Carías Andino, Tegucigalpa, Honduras
Attendance: 17,827
Referee: Yamasaki (Mexico)

15 June 1969

El Salvador	3–0	Honduras
Martínez 27' (pen.), 41'; Acevedo 29'

Estadio Nacional Flor Blanca, San Salvador, El Salvador
Attendance: 36,470
Referee: Van Rosberg (Netherlands Antilles)

27 June 1969

El Salvador	3–2 (a.e.t.)	Honduras
Martínez 8', 28'; Quintanilla 101'		Cardona 19'; Gómez 50'

Estadio Azteca, Mexico City, Mexico
Attendance: 15,326
Referee: Abel Aguilar Elizalde (Mexico)

=== 1981 CONCACAF Championship ===
14 March 1985

Honduras	0–0	El Salvador

Estadio Tiburcio Carías Andino, Tegucigalpa, Honduras
Referee: Luis Paulino Siles (Costa Rica)

=== 1985 CONCACAF Championship ===
10 March 1985

El Salvador	1–2	Honduras
Rivas 63'		Bailey 1'; Laing 77'

Estadio Cuscatlán, San Salvador, El Salvador
Referee: David Socha (United States)

14 March 1985

Honduras	0–0	El Salvador

Estadio Tiburcio Carías Andino, Tegucigalpa, Honduras
Referee: Tony Evangelista (Canada)

=== 2013 CONCACAF Gold Cup ===
12 July 2013
21:30

Honduras	1–0	El Salvador
Claros 90+2'	Report

Sun Life Stadium, Miami Gardens, United States
Attendance: 28,713
Referee: Jair Marrufo (United States)

=== 2019 CONCACAF Gold Cup ===
25 July 2019
22:30

Honduras	4–0	El Salvador
Álvarez 59'; Castillo 65'; Acosta 75'; Izaguirre 90'	Report

Banc of California Stadium, Los Angeles, United States
Attendance: 22,503
Referee: Fernando Guerrero (Mexico)

== List of matches ==
The following is a list of matches played between El Salvador and Honduras since their first meeting in November 1927.

No.	Date	Location	Competition	Result			Series
1	7 November 1927	Tegucigalpa	Friendly	Honduras	1–0	El Salvador	0–0–1
2	8 November 1927	Tegucigalpa	Friendly	Honduras	0–0	El Salvador	0–1–1
3	7 December 1928	San Salvador	Friendly	El Salvador	5–0	Honduras	1–1–1
4	29 March 1930	Havana	1930 Central American and Caribbean Games	El Salvador	1–4	Honduras	1–1–2
5	28 March 1935	San Salvador	1935 Central American and Caribbean Games	El Salvador	3–4	Honduras	1–1–3
6	9 March 1946	San José	1946 CCCF Championship	Honduras	1–3	El Salvador	2–1–3
7	11 March 1950	Guatemala City	1950 Central American and Caribbean Games	El Salvador	1–2	Honduras	2–1–4
8	15 March 1953	San José	1953 CCCF Championship	El Salvador	0–3	Honduras	2–1–5
9	17 August 1955	Tegucigalpa	1955 CCCF Championship	Honduras	3–1	El Salvador	2–1–6
10	12 March 1961	San José	1961 CCCF Championship	El Salvador	1–0	Honduras	3–1–6
11	19 March 1961	San José	1961 CCCF Championship	El Salvador	5–1	Honduras	4–1–6
12	27 March 1963	San Salvador	1963 CONCACAF Championship	El Salvador	2–2	Honduras	4–2–6
13	5 April 1963	San Salvador	1963 CONCACAF Championship	El Salvador	3–0	Honduras	5–2–6
14	14 March 1965	San Salvador	1965 CONCACAF Championship qualification	El Salvador	3–1	Honduras	6–2–6
15	21 May 1967	San Salvador	1968 CONCACAF Pre-Olympic qualification	El Salvador	1–0	Honduras	7–2–6
16	17 July 1968	Tegucigalpa	Friendly	Honduras	0–0	El Salvador	7–3–6
17	31 July 1968	San Salvador	Friendly	El Salvador	2–1	Honduras	8–3–6
18	8 June 1969	Tegucigalpa	1970 FIFA World Cup qualification	Honduras	1–0	El Salvador	8–3–7
19	15 June 1969	San Salvador	1970 FIFA World Cup qualification	El Salvador	3–0	Honduras	9–3–7
20	27 June 1969	Mexico City	1970 FIFA World Cup qualification	El Salvador	3–2 (a.e.t.)	Honduras	10–3–7
21	23 November 1980	San Salvador	1981 CONCACAF Championship qualification	El Salvador	2–1	Honduras	11–3–7
22	30 November 1980	Tegucigalpa	1981 CONCACAF Championship qualification	Honduras	2–0	El Salvador	11–3–8
23	16 November 1981	Tegucigalpa	1981 CONCACAF Championship	Honduras	0–0	El Salvador	11–4–8
24	18 April 1982	San Salvador	Friendly	El Salvador	3–2	Honduras	12–4–8
25	22 April 1982	San Pedro Sula	Friendly	Honduras	1–1	El Salvador	12–5–8
26	10 March 1985	San Salvador	1985 CONCACAF Championship	El Salvador	1–2	Honduras	12–5–9
27	14 March 1985	Tegucigalpa	1985 CONCACAF Championship	Honduras	0–0	El Salvador	12–6–9
28	4 January 1986	Guatemala City	1986 Central American Games	El Salvador	0–2	Honduras	12–6–10
29	29 April 1987	Tegucigalpa	Friendly	Honduras	1–0	El Salvador	12–6–11
30	18 March 1988	Los Angeles	Friendly	El Salvador	0–0	Honduras	12–7–11
31	25 September 1988	Los Angeles	Friendly	El Salvador	0–0	Honduras	12–8–11
32	2 June 1991	San José	1991 UNCAF Nations Cup	El Salvador	1–2	Honduras	12–8–12
33	17 March 1992	Los Angeles	Friendly	El Salvador	1–1	Honduras	12–9–12
34	12 August 1992	Los Angeles	Friendly	El Salvador	0–3	Honduras	12–9–13
35	13 September 1992	San Salvador	Friendly	El Salvador	3–1	Honduras	13–9–13
36	18 September 1992	San Pedro Sula	Friendly	Honduras	1–1	El Salvador	13–10–13
37	9 March 1993	Tegucigalpa	1993 UNCAF Nations Cup	Honduras	3–0	El Salvador	13–10–14
38	25 April 1993	Tegucigalpa	1994 FIFA World Cup qualification	Honduras	3–0	El Salvador	13–10–15
39	9 May 1993	San Salvador	1994 FIFA World Cup qualification	El Salvador	2–1	Honduras	14–10–15
40	14 August 1996	San Pedro Sula	Friendly	Honduras	2–1	El Salvador	14–10–16
41	21 August 1996	San Salvador	Friendly	El Salvador	1–2	Honduras	14–10–17
42	21 October 1996	Tegucigalpa	Friendly	Honduras	1–1	El Salvador	14–11–17
43	18 April 1997	Guatemala City	1997 UNCAF Nations Cup	El Salvador	0–3	Honduras	14–11–18
44	27 April 1997	Guatemala City	1997 UNCAF Nations Cup	El Salvador	0–0	Honduras	14–12–18
45	29 January 1998	San Salvador	Friendly	El Salvador	1–1	Honduras	14–13–18
46	18 November 1998	Los Angeles	Friendly	El Salvador	1–2	Honduras	14–13–19
47	24 March 1999	San José	1999 UNCAF Nations Cup	El Salvador	1–3	Honduras	14–13–20
48	9 February 2000	San Pedro Sula	Friendly	Honduras	5–1	El Salvador	14–13–21
49	16 July 2000	San Salvador	2002 FIFA World Cup qualification	El Salvador	2–5	Honduras	14–13–22
50	2 September 2000	San Pedro Sula	2002 FIFA World Cup qualification	Honduras	5–0	El Salvador	14–13–23
51	27 May 2001	San Pedro Sula	2001 UNCAF Nations Cup	Honduras	1–1	El Salvador	14–14–23
52	15 February 2003	Colón	2003 UNCAF Nations Cup	El Salvador	1–0	Honduras	15–14–23
53	29 June 2003	San Pedro Sula	Friendly	Honduras	1–1	El Salvador	15–15–23
54	3 August 2004	San Salvador	Friendly	El Salvador	0–4	Honduras	15–15–24
55	6 September 2006	Tegucigalpa	Friendly	Honduras	2–0	El Salvador	15–15–25
56	24 March 2007	Fort Lauderdale	Friendly	El Salvador	0–2	Honduras	15–15–26
57	27 March 2007	Cary	Friendly	El Salvador	0–2	Honduras	15–15–27
58	22 August 2007	San Salvador	Friendly	El Salvador	2–0	Honduras	16–15–27
59	26 January 2009	Tegucigalpa	2009 UNCAF Nations Cup	Honduras	2–0	El Salvador	16–15–28
60	1 February 2009	Tegucigalpa	2009 UNCAF Nations Cup	Honduras	1–0	El Salvador	16–15–29
61	10 June 2009	San Pedro Sula	2010 FIFA World Cup qualification	Honduras	1–0	El Salvador	16–15–30
62	14 October 2009	San Salvador	2010 FIFA World Cup qualification	El Salvador	0–1	Honduras	16–15–31
63	4 September 2010	Los Angeles	Friendly	El Salvador	2–2 (3–4 p)	Honduras	16–16–31
64	21 January 2011	Panama City	2011 Copa Centroamericana	El Salvador	0–2	Honduras	16–16–32
65	29 May 2011	Houston	Friendly	El Salvador	2–2	Honduras	16–17–32
66	2 June 2012	Washington, D.C.	Friendly	El Salvador	0–3	Honduras	16–17–33
67	18 January 2013	San José	2013 Copa Centroamericana	El Salvador	1–1	Honduras	16–18–33
68	12 July 2013	Miami Gardens	2013 CONCACAF Gold Cup	El Salvador	0–1	Honduras	16–18–34
69	7 September 2014	Dallas	2014 Copa Centroamericana	Honduras	0–1	El Salvador	17–18–34
70	31 May 2015	Washington, D.C.	Friendly	El Salvador	0–2	Honduras	17–18–35
71	25 March 2016	San Salvador	2018 FIFA World Cup qualification	El Salvador	2–2	Honduras	17–19–35
72	29 March 2016	San Pedro Sula	2018 FIFA World Cup qualification	Honduras	2–0	El Salvador	17–19–36
73	15 January 2017	Panama City	2017 Copa Centroamericana	El Salvador	1–2	Honduras	17–19–37
74	27 May 2017	Washington, D.C.	Friendly	El Salvador	2–2	Honduras	17–20–37
75	25 June 2019	Los Angeles	2019 CONCACAF Gold Cup	Honduras	4–0	El Salvador	17–20–38
76	5 September 2021	San Salvador	2022 FIFA World Cup qualification	El Salvador	0–0	Honduras	17–21–38
77	30 January 2022	San Pedro Sula	2022 FIFA World Cup qualification	Honduras	0–2	El Salvador	18–21–38
78	22 March 2023	Los Angeles	Friendly	Honduras	1–0	El Salvador	18–21–39
79	26 March 2024	Houston	Friendly	Honduras	1–1	El Salvador	18–22–39
80	21 June 2025	Houston	2025 CONCACAF Gold Cup	Honduras	2–0	El Salvador	18–22–40

== Head-to-head ==
- As of 21 June 2025

Pos.	Team	Pld.	W	D	L	GF	GA	GD
1	Honduras	80	40	22	18	126	78	+48
2	El Salvador	80	18	22	40	78	126	–48

== Statistics ==
=== Overall ===
	Matches	Wins			Goals	
	Matches	El Salvador	Draws	Honduras	El Salvador	Honduras
FIFA World Cup qualification	13	4	2	7	11	23
CONCACAF Gold Cup	3	0	0	3	0	7
CONCACAF Championship^{a}	8	3	3	2	11	8
CCCF Championship	5	3	0	2	10	8
UNCAF Nations Cup/Copa Centroamericana	13	2	3	8	6	21
Central American and Caribbean Games	3	0	0	3	5	10
Central American Games	1	0	0	1	0	2
CONCACAF Pre-Olympic Tournament	1	1	0	0	1	0
All competitions	47	13	8	26	44	79
Friendly	33	5	14	12	34	47
All matches	80	18	22	40	79	127

^{a} – includes qualification from 1965 and 1981

=== Individual results at the FIFA World Cup ===
El Salvador	FIFA World Cup	Honduras
2 (1970, 1982)	Appearances	3 (1982, 2010, 2014)
Group stage (1970, 1982)	Best result	Group stage (1982, 2010, 2014)
0	Wins	0
0	Draws	3
6	Losses	6
1	Goals for	3
22	Goals against	14
–21	Goal differential	–11

== See also ==
- List of association football rivalries
