= Netherlands Antilles national football team =

Men's association football team

Netherlands Antilles
1959–2010
- Nickname: De Antilopen
- Association: Nederlands Antilliaanse; Voetbal Unie
- Confederation: CONCACAF (North America)
- Home stadium: Stadion Ergilio Hato
- FIFA code: ANT
First colours	Second colours

FIFA ranking
- Highest: 118 (July 1995)
- Lowest: 188 (December 2003)

First international
- Netherlands Antilles 15–0 Puerto Rico (Caracas, Venezuela; 15 January 1959)

Last international
- Netherlands Antilles 2–2 Suriname (Willemstad, Curaçao; 31 October 2010)

Biggest win
- Netherlands Antilles 15–0 Puerto Rico (Caracas, Venezuela; 15 January 1959)

Biggest defeat
- Netherlands 8–0 Netherlands Antilles (Amsterdam, Netherlands; 5 September 1962); Mexico 8–0 Netherlands Antilles (Port-au-Prince, Haiti; 8 December 1973)

CONCACAF Championship & Gold Cup
- Appearances: 4 (first in 1963)
- Best result: Third place, 1963, 1969

The Netherlands Antilles national football team (Dutch: Nederlands-Antilliaans voetbalelftal; Papiamento: Selekshon Antiano di futbòl) was the national team of the former Netherlands Antilles from 1958 to 2010. It was controlled by the Nederlands Antilliaanse Voetbal Unie. The NAVU consisted of Curaçao and Bonaire. Aruba split in 1986 and has its own team.

The Netherlands Antilles team never qualified for the FIFA World Cup. The country managed to come third in the CONCACAF championships of 1963 and 1969; during the 1963 tournament they were unofficial football world champions for four days after beating Mexico and before losing to Costa Rica.

== History ==
Under the name Curaçao, the team played its first international game in 1934 (against Suriname, which was then still part of the Kingdom of the Netherlands as well) and continued to use the name Curaçao until the qualifications for the World Championships of 1958, although the name of the area had changed from "Territory of Curaçao" to "Netherlands Antilles" in 1948.

== Dissolution of country ==
The Netherlands Antilles was dissolved as a unified political entity on 10 October 2010, and the five constituent islands took on new constitutional statuses within the Kingdom of the Netherlands, forming two new countries (Curaçao and Sint Maarten) and three new special municipalities of the Netherlands (namely Bonaire, Saba and Sint Eustatius).

At the time of the dissolution, the team was about to compete in the qualification tournament for the 2010 Caribbean Championship, and finally competed under an obsolete country name. Sint Maarten national football team, as well as Bonaire national football team are already members of CONCACAF, but are not members of FIFA. The Curaçao national football team took the place of the Netherlands Antilles as a FIFA member.

== Successor teams ==
Both FIFA and CONCACAF consider the Curaçaoan national team to be the direct and sole successor of the Netherlands Antilles national football team. The teams of other territories were inducted as fully new members.

Nation	FIFA Active	International tournament(s)	Round
Curaçao 2011–present	(since 2011)	2017 CONCACAF Gold Cup	Group stage
Curaçao 2011–present	(since 2011)	2019 CONCACAF Gold Cup	Quarter-final
Curaçao 2011–present	(since 2011)	2021 CONCACAF Gold Cup	Withdrew
Curaçao 2011–present	(since 2011)	2026 FIFA World Cup	Group Stage
Sint Maarten 2010–present	(since 2010)		
Bonaire 2010–present	(since 2010)		
Sint Eustatius	n/a		
Saba	n/a		

== Coaching history ==
Caretaker manager are listed in italics.

- (Brazil) Pedro Celestino Dacunha (1957–65)
- (Netherlands Antilles) Wilhelm Canword (1973)
- (Netherlands) Jan Zwartkruis (Note: Jan Zwartkruis served as manager of the Netherlands as well as the Netherlands Antilles concurrently from 1978 to 1981) (1978–81)
- (Netherlands) Rob Groener (1983–85)
- (Netherlands Antilles) Wilhelm Canword (1988)
- (Netherlands) Jan Zwartkruis (1992–94)
- (Netherlands Antilles) Etienne Siliee (1996)
- (Netherlands Antilles) Henry Caldera (2000–02)
- (Netherlands) Pim Verbeek (2003–05)
- (Netherlands Antilles) Etienne Siliee (2005–07)
- (Netherlands) Leen Looyen (2007–09)
- (Netherlands) Remko Bicentini (2009–10)
- (Netherlands Antilles) Henry Caldera (2010)

== Competitive record ==
*Draws include knockout matches decided on penalty kicks.

=== FIFA World Cup ===
FIFA World Cup record								qualification record					
Year	Result	Pld	W	D*	L	GF	GA	Pld	W	D*	L	GF	GA
as (Colony of Curaçao and Dependencies) Territory of Curaçao								as (Colony of Curaçao and Dependencies) Territory of Curaçao					
(Uruguay) 1930	did not enter							did not enter					
(Italy) 1934	did not enter							did not enter					
(France) 1938	did not enter							did not enter					
(Brazil) 1950	did not enter							did not enter					
(Switzerland) 1954	did not enter							did not enter					
(Sweden) 1958	did not qualify							3	1	0	2	4	7
as Netherlands Antilles								as Netherlands Antilles					
(Chile) 1962	did not qualify							6	2	2	2	4	14
(England) 1966	did not qualify							4	1	2	1	2	3
(Mexico) 1970	did not qualify							4	1	0	3	3	9
(Germany) 1974	did not qualify							CONCACAF Championship					
(Argentina) 1978	did not qualify							CONCACAF Championship					
(Spain) 1982	did not qualify							CONCACAF Championship					
(Mexico) 1986	did not qualify							CONCACAF Championship					
(Italy) 1990	did not qualify							CONCACAF Championship					
(United States) 1994	did not qualify							2	0	1	1	1	4
(France) 1998	did not qualify							2	0	1	1	1	2
(South Korea) (Japan) 2002	did not qualify							2	0	1	1	1	6
(Germany) 2006	did not qualify							4	1	0	3	4	8
(South Africa) 2010	did not qualify							4	2	1	1	3	1
Total	–	–	–	–	–	–	–	31	8	8	15	23	54

=== CONCACAF Championship & Gold Cup ===
CONCACAF Championship & Gold Cup record								Qualification record					
Year	Result	Pld	W	D*	L	GF	GA	Pld	W	D*	L	GF	GA
(El Salvador) 1963	Third place	6	3	0	3	10	8	2	2	0	0	4	1
(Guatemala) 1965	Fifth place	5	0	2	3	4	16	Qualified automatically					
(Honduras) 1967	did not qualify							4	0	2	2	4	6
(Costa Rica) 1969	Third place	5	2	1	2	9	12	Qualified automatically					
(Trinidad and Tobago) 1971	Withdrew							Withdrew					
(Haiti) 1973	Sixth place	5	0	2	3	4	19	Qualified automatically					
(Mexico) 1977	did not qualify							2	0	0	2	1	9
(Honduras) 1981	did not qualify							4	0	3	1	1	2
1985	did not qualify							2	0	1	1	0	4
1989	did not qualify							4	2	0	2	4	7
(United States) 1991	did not qualify							Caribbean Cup					
(United States) (Mexico) 1993	did not enter							Caribbean Cup					
(United States) 1996	did not qualify							Caribbean Cup					
(United States) 1998	did not qualify							Caribbean Cup					
(United States) 2000	did not qualify							Caribbean Cup					
(United States) 2002	did not enter							Caribbean Cup					
(United States) (Mexico) 2003	did not qualify							4	1	1	2	3	6
(United States) 2005	did not enter							Caribbean Cup					
(United States) 2007	did not qualify							Caribbean Cup					
(United States) 2009	did not qualify							Caribbean Cup					
(United States) 2011	did not qualify							Caribbean Cup					
Total	Third Place	21	5	5	11	27	55	22	5	7	10	17	35

=== CCCF Championship ===
CCCF Championship record
Year	Result	GP	W	D*	L	GF	GA
as (Colony of Curaçao and Dependencies) Territory of Curaçao
(Costa Rica) 1941	Third place	4	1	2	1	16	12
(El Salvador) 1943	did not enter						
(Costa Rica) 1946	did not enter						
(Guatemala) 1948	Fourth place	8	2	2	4	14	16
(Panama) 1951	did not enter						
(Costa Rica) 1953	Fourth place	6	2	2	2	17	9
(Honduras) 1955	Runners-up	6	4	0	2	11	7
(Netherlands Antilles) 1957	Runners-up	4	2	1	1	7	4
as Netherlands Antilles
(Cuba) 1960	Runners-up	4	2	2	0	9	7
(Costa Rica) 1961	First round	3	1	1	1	4	5
Total	Runners-up	35	14	10	11	78	60

=== CFU Caribbean Cup ===
CFU Championship & Caribbean Cup record								Qualification record					
Year	Result	Pld	W	D*	L	GF	GA	Pld	W	D*	L	GF	GA
(Trinidad and Tobago) 1978	did not qualify							4	1	1	2	1	5
(Suriname) 1979	did not enter							did not enter					
(Puerto Rico) 1981	did not enter							did not enter					
(French Guiana) 1983	did not qualify							Result Unknown					
(Barbados) 1985	did not enter							did not enter					
(Martinique) 1988	did not enter							did not enter					
(Barbados) 1989	Group stage	2	0	2	0	2	2	4	3	0	1	21	4
(Trinidad and Tobago) 1990	did not qualify							2	0	2	0	2	2
(Jamaica) 1991	did not qualify							2	0	0	2	0	5
(Trinidad and Tobago) 1992	did not qualify							3	1	1	1	3	3
(Jamaica) 1993	did not enter							did not enter					
(Trinidad and Tobago) 1994	did not enter							did not enter					
(Cayman Islands) (Jamaica) 1995	did not qualify							5	3	1	1	11	11
(Trinidad and Tobago) 1996	did not qualify							1	0	0	1	0	1
(Antigua and Barbuda) (Saint Kitts and Nevis) 1997	did not qualify							1	0	0	1	1	2
(Jamaica) (Trinidad and Tobago) 1998	Group stage	3	0	0	3	2	9	3	2	1	0	6	4
(Trinidad and Tobago) 1999	did not qualify							2	0	1	1	2	4
(Trinidad and Tobago) 2001	did not enter							did not enter					
(Barbados) 2005	did not enter							did not enter					
(Trinidad and Tobago) 2007	did not qualify							3	0	1	2	1	7
(Jamaica) 2008	did not qualify							5	1	1	3	5	11
(Martinique) 2010	did not qualify							3	0	1	2	5	7
Total	Group stage	5	0	2	3	4	11	38	11	10	17	58	66

=== Olympic Games ===
- –1980: Amateur squads
- 1984–1988: Professional squads
- 1992–present : Under-23 squads

Olympic Games record								Qualification record					
Year	Result	Pld	W	D*	L	GF	GA	Pld	W	D*	L	GF	GA
as (Colony of Curaçao and Dependencies) Territory of Curaçao								as (Colony of Curaçao and Dependencies) Territory of Curaçao					
(Netherlands) 1928	did not enter							Declined participation					
(Germany) 1936	did not enter							Declined participation					
(United Kingdom) 1948	did not enter							Declined participation					
(Finland) 1952	First round	1	0	0	1	1	2	—					
(Australia) 1956	did not enter							Declined participation					
as Netherlands Antilles								as Netherlands Antilles					
(Italy) 1960	did not qualify							2	0	1	1	3	6
(Japan) 1964	did not enter							Declined participation					
(Mexico) 1968	did not enter							Declined participation					
(West Germany) 1972	did not enter							Declined participation					
(Canada) 1976	did not enter							Declined participation					
(Soviet Union) 1980	did not enter							Declined participation					
(United States) 1984	did not enter							Declined participation					
(South Korea) 1988	did not enter							Declined participation					
(Spain) 1992 to present	Under-23 Tournament							Under-23 Tournament					
Total	First round	1	0	0	1	1	2	2	0	1	1	3	6

=== Pan American Games ===
- 1951–1983: Amateur squads

Pan American Games record
Year	Result	Pld	W	D*	L	GF	GA
as (Colony of Curaçao and Dependencies) Territory of Curaçao
(Argentina) 1951	did not enter						
(Mexico) 1955	Bronze Medal	6	2	0	4	11	13
as Netherlands Antilles
Since (United States) 1959	did not enter						
Total	Bronze Medal	6	2	0	4	11	13

=== Central American and Caribbean Games ===
- 1930–1946: Full senior squads
- 1950–1986: Amateur squads

Central American and Caribbean Games record
Year	Result	Pld	W	D*	L	GF	GA
as (Colony of Curaçao and Dependencies) Territory of Curaçao
(Cuba) 1930	did not enter						
(El Salvador) 1935	did not enter						
(Panama) 1938	did not enter						
(Colombia) 1946	Bronze Medal	6	3	2	1	25	10
(Guatemala) 1950	Gold Medal	6	4	1	1	20	6
(Mexico) 1954	did not enter						
as Netherlands Antilles
(Venezuela) 1959	Silver Medal	4	2	1	1	21	5
(Jamaica) 1962	Gold Medal	5	5	0	0	16	5
(Puerto Rico) 1966	Silver Medal	5	4	0	1	11	4
(Panama) 1970	Silver Medal	*	*	*	*	*	*
(Dominican Republic) 1974	Unknown						
(Colombia) 1978	Group stage	5	0	0	5	3	16
(Cuba) 1982	Group stage	3	1	1	1	2	6
(Dominican Republic) 1986	Group stage	2	0	1	1	1	3
Since (Mexico) 1990	Under-23 Tournament						
Total	Gold Medal	36	19	6	11	99	55

== All-time record against other nations ==
Updated 31 May 2012

Team	Pld	W	D	L
Haiti	18	1	4	13
Trinidad and Tobago	17	1	6	10
Suriname	16	5	4	7
El Salvador	16	1	4	11
Costa Rica	15	3	1	11
Mexico	12	2	3	7
Jamaica	10	4	3	7
Honduras	10	2	4	4
Cuba	9	6	1	2
Antigua and Barbuda	9	5	2	2
Guatemala	9	2	5	2
Nicaragua	7	6	0	1
Panama	7	4	1	2
Venezuela	6	3	1	2
Guyana	6	1	1	4
Puerto Rico	4	4	0	0
Grenada	4	1	3	0
United States	4	0	2	2
Aruba	2	1	1	0
Dominican Republic	2	0	1	1
Netherlands	2	0	1	1
Saint Lucia	1	0	1	0
Saint Vincent and the Grenadines	1	0	1	0
Argentina	1	0	0	1
Barbados	1	0	0	1
Bermuda	1	0	0	1
Cayman Islands	1	0	0	1
Total	191	52	50	89

== Honours ==
=== Continental ===
- CONCACAF Championship / Gold Cup:
  - Third place (2): 1963, 1969

=== Regional ===
- CFU Caribbean Cup:
  - Fourth place (1): 1989

=== Friendly ===
- Phillip Seaga Cup :
  - Winners (1): 1963
- Inter Expo Cup / Chippie Polar Cup:
  - Winners (1): 2004
  - Runners-up (2): 2006, 2008
  - Fourth place (1): 2005
- Parbo Bier Cup:
  - Winners (1): 2004

Competition	1st place, gold medalist(s)	2nd place, silver medalist(s)	3rd place, bronze medalist(s)	Total
World Cup	0	0	0	0
CONCACAF Championship / Gold Cup	0	0	2	2
Confederations Cup	0	0	0	0
Olympic Games	0	0	0	0
Total	0	0	2	2

== See also ==
- Bonaire national football team
- Curaçao national football team (1921–1958) – the team before the change of country name to Netherlands Antilles
- Curaçao national football team – the successor to the team
- Sint Maarten national football team
- Netherlands national football team
