= Estadio Nacional de Costa Rica =

Estadio Nacional de Costa Rica may refer to:

- Estadio Nacional de Costa Rica (1924)
- Estadio Nacional de Costa Rica (2011)
