= Óscar Rendoll Gómez =

Chilean football manager (born 1916)

Personal information
- Date of birth: 26 August 1921
- Place of birth: Punta Arenas, Chile
- Date of death: 2 September 1994 (aged 73)
- Place of death: Panama City, Panama

Senior career*
Years	Team	Apps	(Gls)
1940	Deportivo Español		

Managerial career
- 1945: Unión Española (youth)
- 1946–1947: Panama
- 1951–1952: Panama
- * Club domestic league appearances and goals

Óscar Rendoll Gómez (26 August 1921 – 2 September 1994) was a Chilean football manager, player, referee, PE teacher and speaker. He has been one of the five Chileans who have managed the Panama national team along with Óscar Suman (1949), Néstor Valdés (1969), Hugo Tassara (1972–1973) and Renato Panay (1976–1977).

== Career ==
Born in Punta Arenas, Chile, Rendoll Gómez played football at amateur level in local clubs such as Deportivo Español. Then he made a coach course for three years and graduated as a football manager and next worked in the Unión Española youth system until 1946 when he moved to Panama supported by Panamanian Football Federation. The manager of the Panama national team in the late 1940s and early 1950s, he's best known for winning the nation's first international title; the CCCF Championship in 1951. Previously Rendoll Gómez had led the national football team at the 1946 Central American and Caribbean Games, ending the competition with a runner-up medal.

Rendoll Gomez led Panama in the 1952 Panamerican Championship, where the team faced Chile, the team of his country of birth, by first time. The result was a 6–1 loss.

As a curiosity, he used to request help to trading houses and supermarkets to get a suitable food for players.

In 1950, it was founded the first Panamanian referees association with Rendoll Gómez as Honorary President.

== Other works ==
At the same time he studied to become a football manager, he studied and graduated as a PE teacher at the Physical Education Institute of the University of Chile. In Panama, he was well renowned by his contributions in this area, attending to several conferences in countries such as the Dominican Republic, Venezuela, Uruguay, among other countries in Latin America.

In 1944, Rendoll Gómez served as president of Club Deportivo Liceo from Punta Arenas.

== Personal life and death ==
His parents, Oscar Rendoll and Virginia Gómez Sousa, were Portuguese descendants. His maternal grandfather, Francisco Furtado Gómez Cuello, was the founder and president of Portuguese Charity Partnership in 1983 in Punta Arenas.

As a high school student, he was nicknamed Negro (Black) and was elected as Rey Feo (Ugly King/Carnaval King) of the Spring Carnival of Magallanes.

Settled in Panama, Rendoll Gómez died on 2 September 1994 in Panama City.

== Honours ==
Panama

- CCCF Championship (1): 1951
