= Pepino Toledo =

Guatemalan footballer (1919–1980)

Personal information
- Full name: Carlos Humberto Toledo
- Date of birth: 10 August 1919
- Place of birth: Guatemala City, Guatemala
- Date of death: 13 April 1980 (aged 60)
- Position: Striker

Senior career*
Years	Team	Apps	(Gls)
1938–1955	CSD Municipal	???	(???)

International career
1943–1953	Guatemala	17	(25)
- * Club domestic league appearances and goals

Carlos Humberto "Pepino" Toledo (10 August 1919 – 13 April 1980) was a Guatemalan football forward and coach who played the entirety of his professional career for CSD Municipal and was a member of the Guatemala national team.

Toledo was from 1938 to 1955 one of the first stellar players of the Guatemalan top flight during its beginnings, helping Municipal win four titles in seven seasons and being the top goalscorer of the league four times. With the national team he participated in four editions of the Central American and Caribbean Football Championships and twice at the Central American and Caribbean Games, and went on to become the team's top goal scorer.

== Club career ==
Having played in several amateur teams during his early years, Toledo, who played as a forward, was discovered in the late 1930s by CSD Municipal coach Manuel Felipe Carrera who brought him to his team. In 1938, in the first ever match played by Municipal in the Liga Capitalina (the top division), Toledo scored twice against IRCA in a 2-2 draw. Later that season he would score five goals in one match against Aduana Central, giving his team a 5-4 win. He would finish the season with 15 goals, three behind the top scorer, Tipografía Nacional's Roberto Calderón, as Municipal finished in 2nd place. In 1942 the top division was renamed Campeonato de Liga and a new era would begin. In a tight race with Tipografía (Tip Nac), whom by then had attained a bitter rivalry with Municipal, the latter won the tournament, with "Pepino" scoring 15 goals in 12 matches, in what was his first of four consecutive years as the top goalscorer of the league. He contributed with 26 goals in 14 league matches to Municipal's second league title in 1947, affirming his status as one of the great players of his time. For the second time in his career he scored five goals in one match, in a 9-1 win over Guatemala FC.

Municipal won its third league title in the 1950-51 season, and after that, a friendly tournament called Cruz Roja (Red Cross), was played, where they beat four other teams from Central America and Mexico, thanks in part to "Pepino" scoring 6 goals in five matches. On 5 June 1955, in the final week of the 1954-55 season, he scored a goal in a 4-1 win against Tip Nac, which would be his last regular league match. The following week Municipal played a final series against new rivals Comunicaciones, losing the first leg 0-1, and coming back on the second leg with a 2-0 win, with goals by "Pepino" and "Soldado" de León, which gave Municipal their fourth league title, putting the club ahead of Tip Nac four championships to three since the inception of the new league structure in 1942. Toledo would retire having scored and having won the national championship on his last professional match, having scored 129 official goals during his entire career, which as of 2011 remains the fifth highest total in the history of the club.

== National team ==
He was first selected to the Guatemala national team in 1943, participating at the II CCCF Championship where Guatemala finished second on goal differential. At the III CCCF Championship in San José, Costa Rica, Guatemala would finish second in points behind the local side, despite having beaten them 4-1 thanks to a hat-trick by "Pepino".

In 1950, Guatemala hosted the VI Central American and Caribbean Games, and on 26 February, Guatemala played against Colombia, inaugurating the football events at the newly built Estadio Olímpico (later renamed Mateo Flores), winning the match 2-1 with Toledo in the starting line-up. Three years later, Toledo scored two goals at the VI CCCF Championship, against Panama and Nicaragua. On the last day of the same tournament, he played his last international match, a 0-3 loss to hosts Costa Rica, being substituted at halftime. Overall, he scored 25 international goals in 17 appearances, setting a national team record that lasted until 2002 when Juan Carlos Plata surpassed it.

== Coaching career and later years ==
Shortly after his retirement from playing, Toledo started a new phase of his life in football, as a coach. He managed Municipal from 1957 to 1961, winning the domestic cup twice, in the 1957–58 and 1959-60 seasons.

He died in 1980 in a road traffic accident.
