= 1951 CCCF Championship =

Tournament details
- Host country: Panama
- Dates: 25 February – 4 March
- Teams: 3
- Venue(s): Estadio Olímpico de Panamá, Panama City

Final positions
- Champions: Panama (1st title)
- Runners-up: Costa Rica
- Third place: Nicaragua

Tournament statistics
- Matches played: 6
- Goals scored: 30 (5 per match)
- Top scorer: (Panama) Rafael Arana (6 goals)

The 1951 CCCF Championship was the fifth international association football championship for members of the Confederación Centroamericana y del Caribe de Fútbol (CCCF). Hosted by Panama, the competition ran from 25 February – 4 March 1951 and was contested by the national teams of Costa Rica, Nicaragua and Panama. Only three teams contested the tournament as a result of a Polio epidemic. The tournament was used one of the qualifying groups for the Panamerican Championship.

Hosts Panama won the competition for the first time. In the final match of the round-robin tournament, they were crowned champions after defeating Nicaragua 6–2. As a result, Panama qualified for the 1952 Panamerican Championship.

== Background ==
The Confederación Centroamericana y del Caribe de Fútbol (CCCF) was founded in 1938. Along with the North American Football Confederation (NAFC), it was a precursor organisation to the Confederation of North, Central America and Caribbean Association Football (CONCACAF). Within three years of its founding, the CCCF organised a contest for its member associations.

Costa Rica were two-time defending champions after they successfully retained the trophy in 1948. They were the most successful team in the competition's history having won three of the four editions to date. For this edition, Costa Rica sent a B team to represent them.

== Format ==
The tournament was played as a double round-robin where each team would play all of the others twice. The winner would be decided by the total number of points obtained across all matches played. As the competition was used as one of the qualifying groups for the 1952 Panamerican Championship in Chile, the team finishing first would qualify for the tournament.

=== Participants ===
- Costa Rica B
- Nicaragua
- Panama (Hosts)

== Venue ==
All matches were held at the Estadio Olímpico de Panamá in Panama City.

Panama City
Estadio Olímpico de Panamá
Capacity: 7,500

== Summary ==
The competition began on 25 February when José Meza and Eladio Esquivel both scored four goals for two–time defending champions Costa Rica as they defeated Nicaragua 8–1. Two days later, hosts Panama began the competition with a 2–0 win against Costa Rica. On February 28, Panama defeated Nicaragua 4–0 to sit top of the table with four points, two ahead of Costa Rica, at the halfway stage.

Two days later, Panama and Costa Rica drew 1–1. On March 3, Costa Rica won what was their final match in the competition as they defeated Nicaragua 4–1. With just one game left to play, Panama and Costa Rica were tied on five points. As a result, a point against Nicaragua would be enough for Panama to win the competition for the first time. In the final game on March 4, Rafael Arana scored a hat-trick for Panama as they won 6–2 to claim the title.

== Table ==
Pos	Team	Pld	W	D	L	GF	GA	GD	Pts
1	Panama	4	3	1	0	13	3	+10	7
2	Costa Rica	4	2	1	1	13	5	+8	5
3	Nicaragua	4	0	0	4	4	22	−18	0

== Results ==
25 February 1951

Costa Rica	8–1	Nicaragua
Meza (4); Esquivel (4)		Navarro

Estadio Olímpico, Panama City, Panama
Referee: Parchment (Panama)

27 February 1951

Panama	2–0	Costa Rica
Tejada 47' (pen.); L.C. Rangel 77'

Estadio Olímpico, Panama City, Panama
Referee: Elias Coll (Colombia)

28 February 1951

Nicaragua	0–4	Panama
		H. Rangel; Arana (2); Ponce

Estadio Olímpico, Panama City, Panama
Referee: Elias Coll (Colombia)

2 March 1951

Costa Rica	1–1	Panama
Alvarado 85'		Arana 75'

Estadio Olímpico, Panama City, Panama
Referee: Elias Coll (Colombia)

3 March 1951

Nicaragua	1–4	Costa Rica
Unknown		Unknown (4)

Estadio Olímpico, Panama City, Panama

4 March 1951

Panama	6–2	Nicaragua
Arana (3); Valdés; de Bello (2)		Argüello; Cordero

Estadio Olímpico, Panama City, Panama

== Goalscorers ==
There were 30 goals scored in 6 matches, for an average of 5 goals per match.

6 goals

- (Panama) Rafael Arana

4 goals

- (Costa Rica) Eladio Esquivel
- (Costa Rica) José Meza
- (Costa Rica) Unknown scorers

2 goals

- (Panama) José Félix de Bello

1 goal

- (Costa Rica) Edgar Alvarado
- (Nicaragua) Arontes Argüello
- (Nicaragua) Horacio Cordero
- (Nicaragua) Carlos Navarro
- (Nicaragua) Unknown scorer
- (Panama) Luis Carlos Ponce
- (Panama) Horacio Rangel
- (Panama) Luis Carlos Rangel
- (Panama) Félix Tejada
- (Panama) Luis Carlos Valdés
