= Carlos Navarro (footballer) =

Spanish footballer

Personal information
- Full name: Carlos Navarro Marín
- Date of birth: 30 January 2004 (age 22)
- Place of birth: Valencia, Spain
- Height: 1.91 m (6 ft 3 in)
- Position: Centre-back

Team information
- Current team: Mirandés (on loan from Las Palmas)

Youth career
- Rumbo
- Colegio Salgui
- Alboraya
- 2019–2020: Valencia
- 2019–2020: → Alboraya (loan)
- 2020–2021: Alavés
- 2021–2023: Las Palmas
- 2022–2023: → Inter San José (loan)

Senior career*
Years	Team	Apps	(Gls)
2021–2024	Las Palmas C	41	(8)
2024–2026	Las Palmas B	63	(7)
2025–	Las Palmas	0	(0)
2026–	→ Mirandés (loan)	0	(0)
- * Club domestic league appearances and goals as of 10 June 2026

Carlos Navarro Marín (born 30 January 2004) is a Spanish footballer who plays as a centre-back for CD Mirandés, on loan from UD Las Palmas.

== Career ==
Born in Valencia, Navarro represented local sides Rumbo CF, Colegio Salgui and Alboraya UD before joining Valencia CF. However, he was loaned back to his previous club, and later spent a short period at Deportivo Alavés before signing for UD Las Palmas.

Navarro made his senior debut with the Canarians' C-team in the 2021–22 season, in Tercera División RFEF, but later returned to the Juvenil squad, having a loan spell at CF Inter San José in the process. Upon returning, he became a regular starter for the C's, now in the Interinsular Preferente, before being promoted to the reserves ahead of the 2024–25 campaign.

Navarro made his first team debut with Las Palmas on 28 October 2025, starting in a 3–1 away loss to CD Extremadura, for the season's Copa del Rey. The following June, president Miguel Ángel Ramírez announced that he would be a part of the first team squad for the 2026–27 campaign, but was loaned to Primera Federación side CD Mirandés on 20 August 2026.
