= Etienne Siliee =

Personal information
- Place of birth: Willemstad, Netherlands Antilles

Managerial career
- Years: Team
- 1996: Netherlands Antilles
- 2005–2007: Netherlands Antilles
- 2014: Curaçao

Etienne Siliee (often misspelled as Etienne Sealey) is a Curaçao professional football manager. In 1996 and from 2005 to 2007 he coached Netherlands Antilles national football team. Currently he working as a technical director of the Curaçao Football Federation.

He was placed in charge of the Curaçao national football team for their 2014 Caribbean Cup campaign. He is also a coaching license instructor for CONCACAF.
