= Mario Camposeco =

Guatemalan footballer (1921–1951)

- Mario Camposeco

Personal information
- Full name: Mario Salvador Camposeco López
- Date of birth: 6 August 1921
- Place of birth: Quetzaltenango, Guatemala
- Date of death: 17 June 1951 (aged 29)
- Place of death: Quetzaltenango, Guatemala
- Position: Forward

Senior career*
Years	Team	Apps	(Gls)
1938–1940	América Quetzaltenango		
1940–1951	Xelajú		
1942–1943	→ Municipal (loan)		
1948–1949	→ Municipal (loan)		

International career
1943–1951	Guatemala	29	(23)
- * Club domestic league appearances and goals

Mario Salvador Camposeco López (6 August 1921 – 17 June 1951) was a Guatemalan professional footballer.

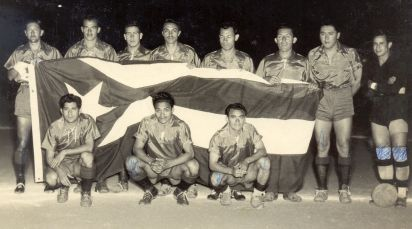
Camposeco (standing fourth from the left) as a member of the Municipal team that participated in the 1948 tournament in Cuba

Born in Quetzaltenango, he started his football career in 1938 playing for the local team América. He then joined club Xelajú becoming its captain and helping the team become champion of the Quetzaltenango department for 10 consecutive seasons (1940–1950). In 1942 he was called as a reinforcement for CSD Municipal by coach Manuel Felipe Carrera to play against Atlante F.C. of Mexico, and in 1943 he was first capped with the Guatemala national team. On 10 March 1946, during the III Central American Football Championship, he scored against Costa Rica in a 4–1 win in San José. In 1948 he was part of a Municipal squad that won a friendly tournament in commemoration of the Cuban Independence in Havana, Cuba. He later participated in the VI Central American and Caribbean Games in 1950. At the time he became the second best scorer ever for Guatemala behind his national teammate Carlos Toledo, with 23 goals, what remains the 4th highest total of all time.

In June 1951, after a friendly match in Quetzaltenango, he was invited by a friend to go aboard an aircraft and fly over the city; there was a mechanic failure and the plane crashed, killing both the pilot and Camposeco. Following the death of the footballer, Quetzaltenango club Xelajú changed its name to "Xelajú M.C." in his honor. The team's stadium was also renamed to Estadio Mario Camposeco after him.
