= CCCF Championship =

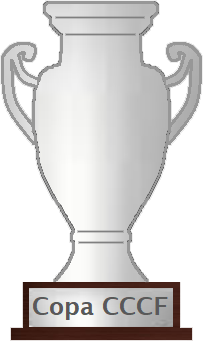
- Organizer(s): CCCF
- Founded: 1941; 85 years ago
- Abolished: 1961; 65 years ago
- Region: Central America; Caribbean; Suriname
- Teams: 3–9
- Qualifier for: Panamerican Championship (1952–1960)
- Related competitions: NAFC Championship
- Last champion(s): Costa Rica (7th title)
- Most championships: Costa Rica (7 titles)

The CCCF Championship was an official association football competition organized by CCCF as the premier regional tournament for men's senior national teams from Central America, the Caribbean and Suriname. It was held between 1941 to 1961, and featured between three and nine participating teams throughout its history. The champions of 1951 and 1955 also qualified for the Panamerican Championship.

Ten editions of the competition were held, the most successful team was Costa Rica with seven titles.

== History ==
The regional competition was born in 1938, in Panama City, with the founding of the Confederación Centroamericana y del Caribe de Fútbol (English: Central American and Caribbean Football Confederation), but the outbreak of the Second World War, a year later, prevented the first championship from taking place.

The initiative, at first, did not have great acceptance in May 1941, during the opening tournament in the Costa Rican capital San José, as only five teams were registered. The champion was the host Costa Rica and in the individual field, the Costa Rican José Rafael "Fello" Meza and the Curaçao-born Hans Najar were the top scorers, with eight goals, and the Costa Rican Hugo Zúñiga was the goalkeeper who was beaten the least, having only conceded five goals in four games.

In the II Central American and Caribbean Football Championship, held in December 1943 at the Estadio Jorge "El Mágico" González in San Salvador.

The host El Salvador was shaping up to be the future champion, and to do so it only needed to beat Costa Rica. The tournament's Organizing Committee was so confident that it prepared a final ceremony with great pomp and display. Unfortunately for them, Costa Rica won 4–2, against a local team cheered on by 30,000 people. The Ticos thus aborted the Salvadoran celebration. The fans unleashed their anger against Costa Ricans and Guatemalans, who happily hugged each other in the middle of the field and were showered with insults. Members of the army intervened to guard the Costa Rican team to the Astoria Hotel, guaranteeing their safety. The site was soon surrounded by a crowd, which came defiant of their team's defeat.

El Salvador and Guatemala tied for first place with nine points, and had to play a playoff to decide the title. But the Guatemalan delegation, after the bitter experience of Costa Rica in the last game, decided to withdraw from the competition, fearful of what would happen if they won, so the Salvadoran team was the champion for having a better goal difference than the Guatemalans.

The III Central American and Caribbean Football Championship, held again in San José, between February and March 1946, Guatemala was one point behind Costa Rica, which took over the title with eight points, compared to seven of its enemies.

For the IV Central American and Caribbean Football Championship, Costa Rica once again took over the laurels. An incredible 5–4 in favor of the Canaleros, in their duel against Guatemala, automatically produced the championship for Costa Rica with 11 points.

Jaime Meza, like his brother Fello did in 1941, obtained this time the title of top scorer of the championship, with 11 points; while Manuel Cantillo was declared the goalkeeper with the fewest defeats, with eight goals in five matches.

Only Nicaragua, Panama and Costa Rica attended the 1951 Central American and Caribbean tournament, as Guatemala, El Salvador and the rest of the nations in the area declined to participate, concerned about the news of an outbreak of polio in Panama.

The first game was Costa Rica, which decided to bring a team of young people since it protected its figures from the disease, against the weak Nicaraguan team. It was the only game that the Ticos took seriously, as they won it with an unchallengeable 8–1.

However, this victory, which fueled the belief that the tournament would be another trophy for the Ticos, was just an illusion. The Panamanians soon defeated them 0–2, in a very rough game.

In the second round, Costa Rica lost the chance to retain the cup, as it tied 1–1 with Panama and beat the Panamanian team 7–2, results that gave the title to the host team and the runner-up spot to the Costa Rican team. Thanks to the title, the host qualified for the 1952 Panamerican Championship.

Undefeated in six games, it was the highest scoring team, with 19 goals, and the team with the fewest goals scored, with two. These results gave Costa Rica - in March 1953 - its fourth Central American and Caribbean football title, with which it regained the crown lost two years earlier in Panama.

Costa Rica thus managed, with a football related to quality and spectacle, to overcome all rivals and add the unattainable score of 12 points.

The next tournament was held at the National Stadium in Tegucigalpa, from August 14 to 28, 1955, and was quite an event, since Guatemala withdrew after the incidents in the match against Costa Rica; the organizing committee first decided to award 2 points to all teams even though they had to play against Guatemala (Cuba, Honduras and Aruba) but following a protest from Curaçao and consultation with FIFA, it was decided on August 25 to annul all their results.

In the end, Costa Rica was the champion, winning 4 of the last 5 editions. Therefore, it qualified for the 1956 Panamerican Championship.

Havana (Cuba) took part in the IX Central American and Caribbean Football Championship between February and March 1960.

Costa Rica regained the championship title that it had lost in 1957, due to its absence from the tournament in Willemstad, Curaçao, and which on that occasion was passed on to Haiti.

The championship was played on that occasion in a single round, all against all, with the participation of Dutch Guiana, Honduras, the Netherlands Antilles, Costa Rica and the host country, Cuba, which was going through times of turmoil due to the recent revolutionary events of 1959, led by Fidel Castro.

At the end of the contest, Costa Rica and the Netherlands Antilles had six points. It was therefore necessary to hold an attractive playoff game.

The Ticos showed their hegemony and better football, and consequently, they defeated the team 4–0, thus the title once again remaining in Costa Rican territory. As an additional reward for this triumph, Costa Rica placed one of its forwards, Alberto Armijo, as the top scorer of the competition, with five goals.

No one was spared from Costa Rica's artillery during the 10th Central American and Caribbean Football Championship, held in San José in March 1961. In seven matches in the first and second phases, they scored 32 goals against the enemy. The Costa Rican team's performance, which earned them the title of the last Central American and Caribbean Championship held, was led by Juan Ulloa, author of ten victories in the competition.

An undefeated record that confirmed Costa Rica as the last champion of the regional competition. They won seven titles throughout their ten editions. An unforgettable era in which Costa Rican football was the strongest in the area.

== Results ==
Year	Hosts	Champions	Results	Runners-up	Third place	Fourth place
1941	Costa Rica	Costa Rica	Round-robin	El Salvador	(Colony of Curaçao and Dependencies); Curaçao	Panama
1943	El Salvador	— (Note: Sources differ over whether the championship was awarded or not.)			Costa Rica	Nicaragua
1946	Costa Rica	Costa Rica	Round-robin	Guatemala	El Salvador	Honduras
1948	Guatemala	Costa Rica	Round-robin	Guatemala	Panama	(Colony of Curaçao and Dependencies); Curaçao
1951	Panama	Panama	Round-robin	Costa Rica	Nicaragua	— (Note: Only three teams participated.)
1953	Costa Rica	Costa Rica	Round-robin	Honduras	Guatemala	(Colony of Curaçao and Dependencies); Curaçao
1955	Honduras	Costa Rica	Round-robin	(Colony of Curaçao and Dependencies); Curaçao	Honduras	El Salvador
1957	Netherlands Antilles	Haiti	Round-robin	(Colony of Curaçao and Dependencies); Curaçao (Note: The Territory of Curaçao officially became the Netherlands Antilles on 15 December 1954 although the national football team played under the name of Curaçao until 1958.)	Honduras	Panama
1960	Cuba	Costa Rica	Round-robin	Netherlands Antilles	Honduras	(Suriname (Kingdom of the Netherlands)); Suriname
1961	Costa Rica	Costa Rica	Round-robin	El Salvador	Honduras	Haiti

== Performances ==
Team	Champions	Runners-up	Third place	Fourth place	Total
Costa Rica	7 (1941, 1946, 1948, 1953, 1955, 1960, 1961)	1 (1951)	1 (1943)	–	9
Panama	1 (1951)	–	1 (1948)	2; 1941, 1957)	4
Haiti	1 (1957)	–	–	1 (1961)	2
Curaçao/Netherlands Antilles	–	3 (1955, 1957, 1960)	1 (1941)	2 (1948, 1953)	6
El Salvador	–	2 (1941, 1961)	1 (1946)	1 (1955)	4
Guatemala	–	2 (1946, 1948)	1 (1953)	–	3
Honduras	–	1 (1953)	4 (1955, 1957, 1960, 1961)	1 (1946)	6
Nicaragua	–	–	1 (1951)	1 (1943)	2
Suriname	–	–	–	1 (1960)	1

Notes

Italic — Hosts

== Competitive records ==
Team	(Costa Rica) 1941	(El Salvador) 1943	(Costa Rica) 1946	(Guatemala) 1948	(Panama) 1951	(Costa Rica) 1953	(Honduras) 1955	(Netherlands Antilles) 1957	(Cuba) 1960	(Costa Rica) 1961	Years
(Netherlands) Aruba							5				1
Costa Rica	1st	3rd	1st	1st	2nd	1st	1st		1st	1st	9
Cuba (Note: NAFC Member 1946-1955)							7	5	5	GS	4
Curaçao/Netherlands Antilles	3rd			4		4	2nd	2nd	2nd	GS	7
El Salvador	2nd		3rd	5		5	4			2nd	7
Guatemala			2nd	2nd		3rd	w/o (Note: Guatemala only played 3 matches before withdrawing the tourment)			GS	6
Haiti								1st		4	2
Honduras			4			2nd	3rd	3rd	3rd	3rd	6
Nicaragua	5	4	6		3rd	6				GS	6
Panama	4		5	3rd	1st	7		4		GS	7
Suriname									4		1
Total	5	4	6	5	3	7	7	5	5	9	

Legend

- 1st – Champions
- 2nd – Runners-up
- 3rd – Third place
- 4th – Fourth place
- QF – Quarterfinals
- GS – Group stage
- q – Qualified
- — Hosts

== Records and statistics ==
=== Winning managers ===
Year	Manager	Nation
1941	(Costa Rica) Alejandro Morera Soto	Costa Rica
1946	(Nicaragua) Hernán Bolaños	Costa Rica
1948	(Nicaragua) Hernán Bolaños	Costa Rica
1951	(Chile) Óscar Rendoll Gómez	Panama
1953	(Brazil) Otto Bumbel	Costa Rica
1955	(Costa Rica) Alfredo Piedra	Costa Rica
1957	(Greece) Dan Georgiadis	Haiti
1960	(Uruguay) Ruben Amorín	Costa Rica
1961	(Spain) Eduardo Toba Muino	Costa Rica

=== Table Rankings ===
Costa Rica was the leader in the ranking and had the most participations with nine.

Rank	Team	Part	Pts	Pld	W	D	L	GF	GA	GD	Titles
1	Costa Rica	9	84	51	40	4	7	189	56	+133	7
2	El Salvador	7	40	33	18	4	11	94	64	+30	-
3	Guatemala	5	40	35	16	8	11	82	61	+30	-
4	Curaçao/Netherlands Antilles	7	38	36	14	10	12	79	64	+15	-
5	Honduras	6	33	31	14	5	12	64	50	+14	-
6	Panama	7	26	35	11	4	20	60	94	-34	1
7	Haiti	2	14	11	7	0	4	22	22	0	1
8	(Netherlands) Aruba	1	5	6	2	1	3	9	9	0	-
9	Cuba	4	4	18	2	0	16	11	49	-38	-
10	Nicaragua	6	4	28	2	0	26	28	157	-129	-
11	Suriname	1	3	4	1	1	2	4	5	-1	-

=== Top goalscorers ===
Scoring 4 goals more it was considered the top scorer, Jimie Meza (Costa Rica) was the top scorer with 11 goals becoming the top CCCF scorer in the history

Scorer	Goals
(Costa Rica) Jamie Meza	11 goals
(Guatemala) Carlos Humberto Toledo	10 goals
(Costa Rica) Fello Meza (Honduras) Roldofo Ramínez Godoy (Haiti) Charles Fenol (Netherlands) Hans Nahar	8 goals
(Panama) Rafael Arana	6 goals
(Costa Rica) Alberto Ulloa	5 goals
(Costa Rica) Rodolfo Harrera (El Salvador) Mario Murillo (El Salvador) Juan Francisco Barazza	4 goals

=== Biggest wins ===
Below are the biggest wins in the CCCF Championship with a difference of 7 or more goals:

Team	Store	Team	Edition
Honduras	10–0	Nicaragua	(Costa Rica) 1946 CCCF Championship
El Salvador	10–1	Nicaragua	(El Salvador) 1946 CCCF Championship
El Salvador	10–2	Nicaragua	(Costa Rica) 1961 CCCF Championship
Curaçao	9–1	Nicaragua	(Costa Rica) 1941 CCCF Championship
El Salvador	8–0	Nicaragua	(Costa Rica) 1941 CCCF Championship
Curaçao	8–0	Nicaragua	(Costa Rica) 1953 CCCF Championship
Costa Rica	8–0	Haiti	(Costa Rica) 1961 CCCF Championship
El Salvador	8–1	Nicaragua	(El Salvador) 1943 CCCF Championship
Costa Rica	8–1	Nicaragua	(Panama) 1951 CCCF Championship
Costa Rica	7–0	Panama	(Costa Rica) 1941 CCCF Championship
Costa Rica	7–0	Nicaragua	(El Salvador) 1943 CCCF Championship
Costa Rica	7–0	Panama	(Costa Rica) 1946 CCCF Championship
Guatemala	7–0	Nicaragua	(Costa Rica) 1946 CCCF Championship
Costa Rica	7–0	Panama	(Guatemala) 1948 CCCF Championship

=== Panamerican Championship ===
The CCCF Championship was also a qualification path to the Panamerican Championship until 1960, only two CCCF teams participated on the championship.

Team	(Chile) 1952 (6)	(Mexico) 1956 (6)	(Costa Rica) 1960 (4)
Panama	6th		
Costa Rica		3rd	4th

== See also ==
- CCCF
- NAFC Championship
- Panamerican Championship
- CCCF Youth Championship
- Campeonato Centroamericano
