= Alboraya UD =

Spanish football club

Alboraya
- Full name: Unión Deportiva Alboraya
- Founded: 1978
- Ground: Municipal Francisco Cardona Gil, Alboraya, Valencian Community, Spain
- Capacity: 1,000
- President: Xema Soler
- Head coach: Salvador Casanova
- 2024–25: Primera FFCV – Group 1, 13th of 16
Home colours	Away colours

Alboraya Unión Deportiva is a Spanish football team based in Alboraya, in the Valencian Community. Founded in 2008, they hold home matches at Campo Municipal Francisco Cardona Gil, with a capacity of 1,000 people.

== Season to season ==
Season	Tier	Division	Place	Copa del Rey
1978–79	8	3ª Reg.	10th	
1979–80	8	3ª Reg.	9th	
1980–81	8	3ª Reg.	8th	
1981–82	8	3ª Reg.	6th	
1982–83	8	3ª Reg.	10th	
1983–84	8	3ª Reg.	7th	
1984–85	8	3ª Reg.	1st	
1985–86	7	2ª Reg.	6th	
1986–87	7	2ª Reg.	9th	
1987–88	7	2ª Reg.	1st	
1988–89	6	1ª Reg.	2nd	
1989–90	5	Reg. Pref.	2nd	
1990–91	4	3ª	17th	
1991–92	5	Reg. Pref.	4th	
1992–93	5	Reg. Pref.	16th	
1993–94	5	Reg. Pref.	11th	
1994–95	5	Reg. Pref.	8th	
1995–96	5	Reg. Pref.	9th	
1996–97	5	Reg. Pref.	14th	
1997–98	5	Reg. Pref.	12th	

Season	Tier	Division	Place	Copa del Rey
1998–99	5	Reg. Pref.	16th	
1999–2000	6	1ª Reg.	1st	
2000–01	5	Reg. Pref.	11th	
2001–02	5	Reg. Pref.	5th	
2002–03	5	Reg. Pref.	7th	
2003–04	5	Reg. Pref.	8th	
2004–05	5	Reg. Pref.	15th	
2005–06	5	Reg. Pref.	8th	
2006–07	5	Reg. Pref.	13th	
2007–08	5	Reg. Pref.	16th	
2008–09	6	1ª Reg.	1st	
2009–10	5	Reg. Pref.	15th	
2010–11	5	Reg. Pref.	14th	
2011–12	5	Reg. Pref.	11th	
2012–13	5	Reg. Pref.	8th	
2013–14	5	Reg. Pref.	10th	
2014–15	5	Reg. Pref.	11th	
2015–16	5	Reg. Pref.	15th	
2016–17	5	Reg. Pref.	16th	
2017–18	6	1ª Reg.	4th	

Season	Tier	Division	Place	Copa del Rey
2018–19	6	1ª Reg.	3rd	
2019–20	6	1ª Reg.	1st	
2020–21	5	Reg. Pref.	6th	
2021–22	6	Reg. Pref.	6th	
2022–23	6	Reg. Pref.	6th	
2023–24	6	Lliga Com.	15th	
2024–25	7	1ª FFCV	13th	
2025–26	DNP			

- 1 season in Tercera División
