= 1961 CCCF Championship =

Tournament details
- Host country: Costa Rica
- Dates: 1–19 March
- Teams: 9

Final positions
- Champions: Costa Rica
- Runners-up: El Salvador
- Third place: Honduras
- Fourth place: Haiti

Tournament statistics
- Matches played: 22
- Goals scored: 90 (4.09 per match)
- Top scorer: (Costa Rica) Juan Ulloa (10 goals)
- Fair play award: Nicaragua

The 1961 CCCF Championship was the tenth and last edition of the CCCF Championship, the tournament took place from March 5 to 19, 1961 in the Costa Rican capital (San José).

This was the last edition of the tournament because in September of the same year, the Confederación Centroamericana y del Caribe de Fútbol would merge with the NAFC to create the new Confederation of North, Central America and Caribbean Football, Concacaf, which would later found the CONCACAF Championship that began in 1963. The champion was the host Costa Rica.

== Venues ==
San José
Estadio Nacional de Costa Rica
Capacity: 25 000 spectators

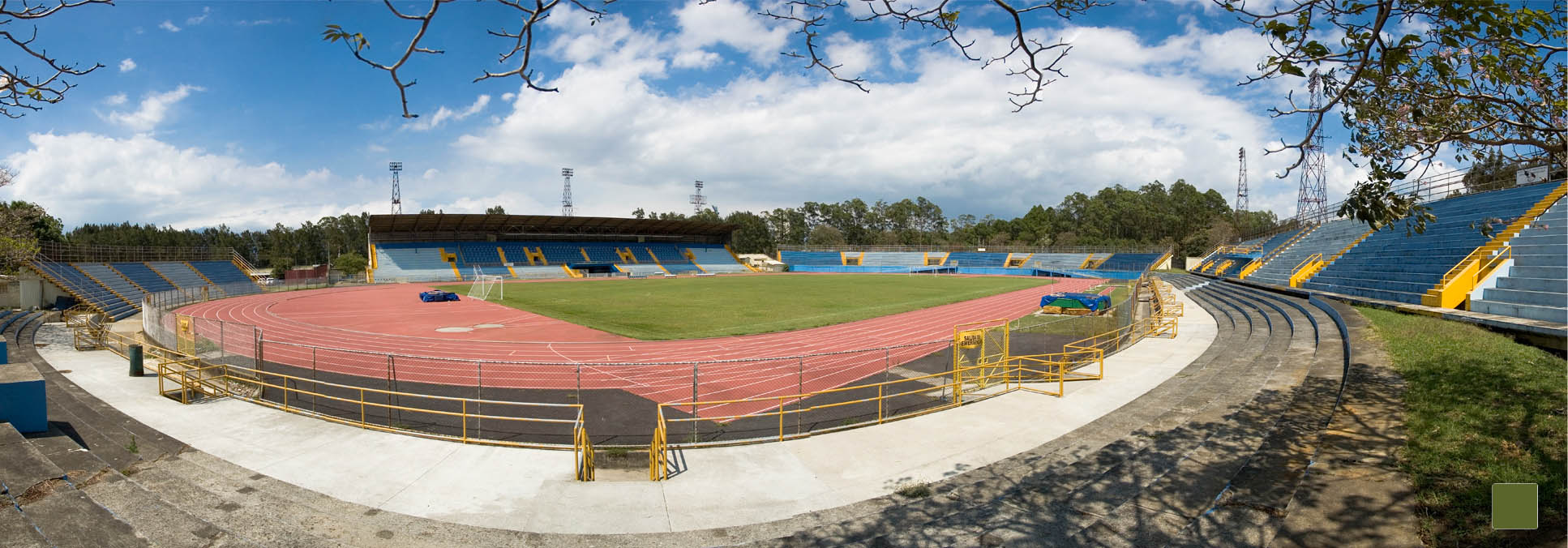
Estadio Nacional, venue

== Participating teams ==
Nine teams participated on the final tournament

- Costa Rica (Hosts)
- Cuba
- El Salvador
- Guatemala
- Haiti
- Honduras
- Netherlands Antilles
- Nicaragua
- Panama

== First round ==
=== Group 1 ===
Pos	Team	Pld	W	D	L	GF	GA	GD	Pts
1	Costa Rica	4	4	0	0	17	4	+13	8
2	Haiti	4	3	0	1	8	6	+2	6
3	Guatemala	4	2	0	2	7	7	0	4
4	Panama	4	1	0	3	3	11	−8	2
5	Cuba	4	0	0	4	2	9	−7	0

1 March 1961

Guatemala	2–4	Costa Rica
López Contreras 29'; García 37'		Ulloa 9'; Monge 14'; Rodríguez 43'; Jiménez 76'

Estadio Nacional de Costa Rica, Costa Rica
2 March 1961

Cuba	1–2	Haiti
García 69'		Délices 25'; Delpeche 79'

Estadio Nacional de Costa Rica, Costa Rica
5 March 1961

Costa Rica	4–1	Cuba
Rojas 3', 10'; Córdoba 39'; Ulloa 52'		García 75'

Estadio Nacional de Costa Rica, Costa Rica
6 March 1961

Guatemala	2–0	Panama
Peña 35'; López Contreras 65'

Estadio Nacional de Costa Rica, Costa Rica
7 March 1961

Panama	1–3	Haiti
Lombardo 24'		Pierre 26', 61', 82'

Estadio Nacional de Costa Rica, Costa Rica
8 March 1961

Costa Rica	6–1	Panama
Rojas 33'; Gobán 48'; Ulloa 66' (pen.), 82', 86'; Samuel 81' (o.g.)		Sánchez 35'

Estadio Nacional de Costa Rica, Costa Rica
8 March 1961

Cuba	0–2	Guatemala
		Ewing 46'; Peña 77'

Estadio Nacional de Costa Rica, Costa Rica
11 March 1961

Haiti	0–3	Costa Rica
		Grant 15'; Ulloa 18'; Rojas 31'

Estadio Nacional de Costa Rica, Costa Rica
11 March 1961

Panama	1–0	Cuba
Rodríguez 77'

Estadio Nacional de Costa Rica, Costa Rica
14 March 1961

Haiti	3–1	Guatemala
Delices 5'; Pierre 50', 83'		García 6'

Estadio Nacional de Costa Rica, Costa Rica

=== Group 2 ===
Pos	Team	Pld	W	D	L	GF	GA	GD	Pts
1	El Salvador	3	2	1	0	11	2	+9	5
2	Honduras	3	2	0	1	10	3	+7	4
3	Netherlands Antilles	3	1	1	1	4	5	−1	3
4	Nicaragua	3	0	0	3	3	18	−15	0

3 March 1961

Netherlands Antilles	2–1	Nicaragua
Loran 18', 65'		Morales 55'

Estadio Nacional de Costa Rica, Costa Rica
6 March 1961

Netherlands Antilles	0–0	El Salvador

Estadio Nacional de Costa Rica, Costa Rica
9 March 1961

Honduras	4–2	Netherlands Antilles
Pablo 3' (o.g.); Suazo 69'; Flores 81'; Leaky 87'		Loran 11', 41'

Estadio Nacional de Costa Rica, Costa Rica
10 March 1961

El Salvador	10–2	Nicaragua
Ruano 5' (pen.); Barrazza 14', 15', 26', 80'; Cubas 30'; Monge 40', 52'; E. Hernández 69', 74'		Tamáriz 27'; Davila 60'

Estadio Nacional de Costa Rica, Costa Rica
12 March 1961

El Salvador	1–0	Honduras
Barraza 3'

Estadio Nacional de Costa Rica, Costa Rica
13 March 1961

Nicaragua	0–6	Honduras
		Enamorado 43', 60', 77'; Leaky 49'; Taylor 55'; Flores 67'

Estadio Nacional de Costa Rica, Costa Rica

== Final round ==
Pos	Team	Pld	W	D	L	GF	GA	GD	Pts
1	Costa Rica	3	3	0	0	15	0	+15	6
2	El Salvador	3	2	0	1	7	5	+2	4
3	Honduras	3	1	0	2	3	8	−5	2
4	Haiti	3	0	0	3	0	12	−12	0

15 March 1961

Honduras	0–3	Costa Rica
		Ulloa 55'; Monge 66'; Gobán 89'

Estadio Nacional de Costa Rica, Costa Rica
15 March 1961

Haiti	0–2	El Salvador
		C. Hernández 2'; Ruano 59'

Estadio Nacional de Costa Rica, Costa Rica
17 March 1961

Costa Rica	4–0	El Salvador
Rojas 6'; Quesada 39'; Ulloa 50'; Gámez 52'

Estadio Nacional de Costa Rica, Costa Rica
17 March 1961

Honduras	2–0	Haiti
Suazo 2'; Leaky 23'

Estadio Nacional de Costa Rica, Costa Rica
19 March 1961

Costa Rica	8–0	Haiti
Monge 10', 37', 58', 89'; Ulloa 56' (pen.), 85'; Pearson 20'; Quesada 27'

Estadio Nacional de Costa Rica, Costa Rica
19 March 1961

El Salvador	5–1	Honduras
Merlos 30', 60'; Ruanos 55'; Monge 71', 85'		Rodríguez 25'

Estadio Nacional de Costa Rica, Costa Rica

1961 CCCF Championship

Costa Rica
7th title

== Team of the Tournament ==
Ideal XI by RSSSF
Goalkeeper	Defenders	Midfielders	Forwards
(Honduras) Jorge Zavala	(Costa Rica) Alvaro Chavez (El Salvador) Rodolfo Fuentes (El Salvador) César Reynosa	(Haiti) Roland Crispin (Guatemala) Jorge Roldán	(Haiti) Lucien Pierre (Costa Rica) Juan Ulloa (Costa Rica) Jorge Monge (Costa Rica) Rigoberto Rojas (El Salvador) Juan Francisco Barraza
