= 1943 CCCF Championship =

1943 Central American football championship

Tournament details
- Host country: El Salvador
- Dates: 5–19 December
- Teams: 4
- Venue(s): Estadio Nacional Flor Blanca, San Salvador

Final positions
- Champions: Unknown (Note: Sources differ over whether or not the championship was awarded.)

Tournament statistics
- Matches played: 12
- Goals scored: 76 (6.33 per match)
- Top scorer: (Costa Rica) Francisco Zeledón (9 goals)

The 1943 CCCF Championship was the second international association football championship for members of the Confederación Centroamericana y del Caribe de Fútbol (CCCF). Hosted by El Salvador, the competition ran from 5–19 December 1943 and was contested by the national teams of Costa Rica, El Salvador, Guatemala and Nicaragua.

Although all the scheduled round-robin matches were played, sources differ on the outcome of the tournament. Hosts El Salvador and Guatemala finished level on nine points and were due to contest a championship play-off, but the match did not take place following violent protests. Contemporary sources in El Salvador claim the trophy was awarded to El Salvador as Guatemala were deemed to have forfeited the play-off whereas Costa Rican and Guatemalan sources say that the tournament was declared null and void.

== Background ==
The Confederación Centroamericana y del Caribe de Fútbol (CCCF) was founded in 1938. Along with the North American Football Confederation (NAFC), it was a precursor organisation to the Confederation of North, Central America and Caribbean Association Football (CONCACAF). Within three years of its founding, the CCCF organised a contest for its member associations.

Costa Rica were the defending champions having won the inaugural competition as hosts in 1941.

== Format ==
The tournament was played as a double round-robin where each team would play all of the others twice. The winner would be decided by the total number of points obtained across all matches played. Should two teams be tied on points for first place at the end of the tournament, a play-off would be organised to decide the winner.

=== Participants ===
- Costa Rica
- El Salvador
- Guatemala
- Nicaragua

== Venue ==
All matches were held at the Estadio Nacional Flor Blanca in San Salvador.

San Salvador
Estadio Nacional Flor Blanca
Capacity: 35,000
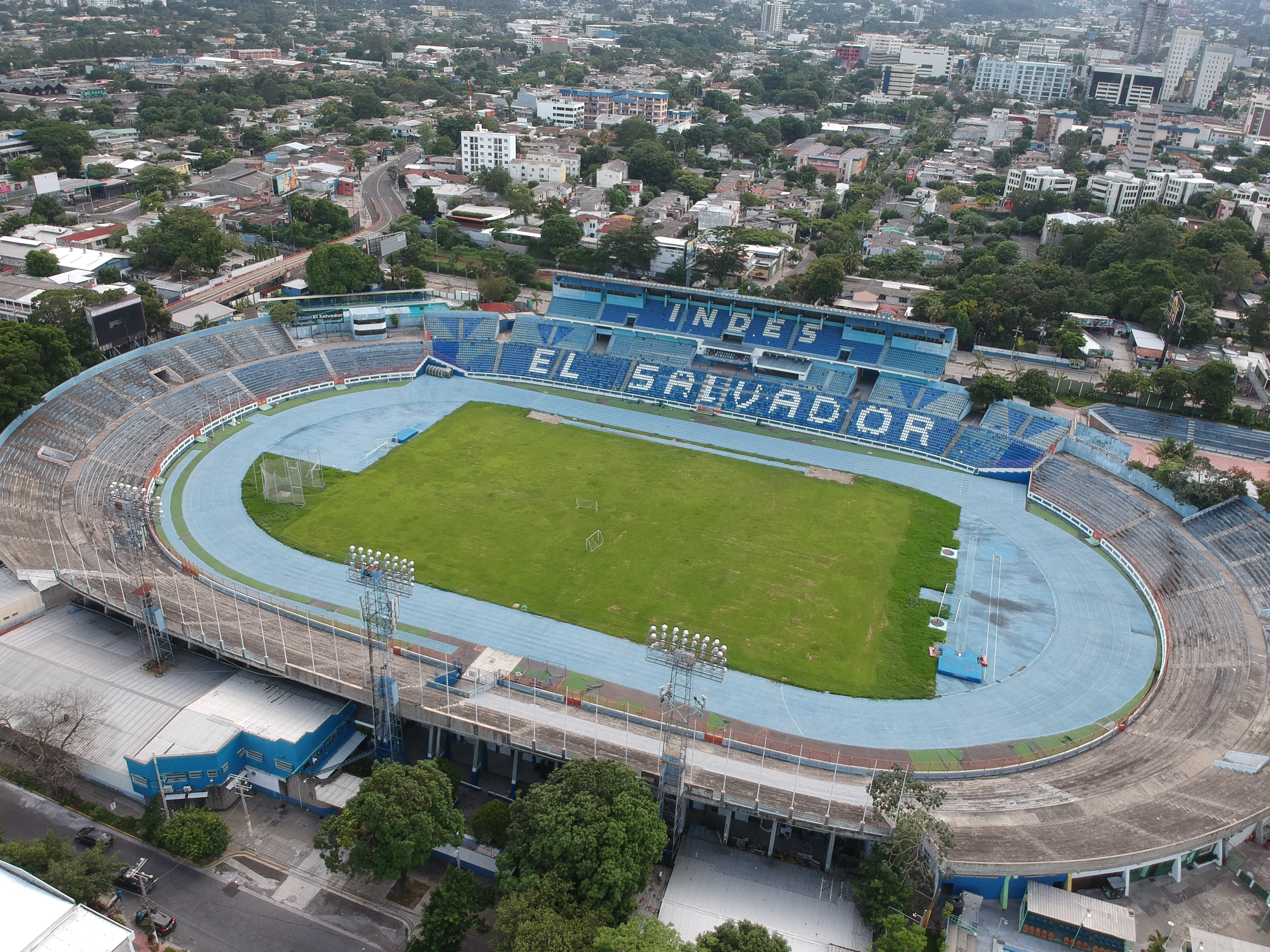

== Summary ==
The competition began on 5 December 1943 when El Salvador and Guatemala drew 2–2 and a Francisco Zeledón hat-trick helped Costa Rica to a 7–0 win against Nicaragua. Two days later, Guatemala and El Salvador recorded their first wins of the competition as they defeated Costa Rica 3–2 and Nicaragua 8–1 respectively. On 9 December, Zeledón scored twice more to take his tally to six goals in three games but it wasn't enough to prevent El Salvador from defeating Costa Rica 4–2. Guatemala then defeated Nicaragua 6–2 to leave El Salvador and Guatemala tied at the top on five points at the half way stage.

The top two would face off on December 12, when Pepino Toledo opened the scoring for Guatemala before goals from Luis Alonso Torres and Miguel Cruz saw El Salvador come from behind to win 2–1 and go two points clear at the top. Similarly, Costa Rica came from behind to beat Nicaragua 3–2. Four days later, Cruz scored four times and Miguel Rivas scored a hat-trick as El Salvador defeated Nicaragua 10–1. The result left the hosts within a point of winning the championship. Guatemala defeated Costa Rica 4–2 to take the championship fight until the last match. In the final round of matches on 19 December, Guatemala defeated Nicaragua 5–1 which left El Salvador needing just a point to claim the crown. However, despite leading twice, El Salvador lost 4–2 to Costa Rica. The result left both El Salvador and Guatemala level on nine points and meant a championship play-off would be scheduled for 21 December.

After full time in the final matches, celebrations involving the Guatemalan and Costa Rican players triggered violent protests in the crowd which was mainly made up of local El Salvador supporters. The protests spilled over to outside the team hotels and left the Guatemalan squad fearing what could happen if a play-off were to go ahead. On the advice of Jorge Ubico, President of Guatemala, the team did not contest the play-off and left El Salvador as soon as possible.

Sources differ on whether the championship was awarded or not. In Costa Rica and Guatemala, it was reported that the organising committee declared the championship null and void. The trophy was given to the Nicaraguan delegation for safekeeping. However, in El Salvador, it is claimed that the host nation was declared champion as Guatemala were deemed to have forfeited the play-off.

== Table ==
| Pos | Team | Pld | W | D | L | GF | GA | GD | Pts |
|---|---|---|---|---|---|---|---|---|---|
| 1 | El Salvador | 6 | 4 | 1 | 1 | 28 | 11 | +17 | 9 |
| 1 | Guatemala | 6 | 4 | 1 | 1 | 21 | 11 | +10 | 9 |
| 3 | Costa Rica | 6 | 3 | 0 | 3 | 20 | 15 | +5 | 6 |
| 4 | Nicaragua | 6 | 0 | 0 | 6 | 7 | 39 | −32 | 0 |

== Results ==
5 December 1943

| El Salvador | 2–2 | Guatemala |
|---|---|---|
| Monterrosa 39'; Torres 41' | | Toledo 31', 60' |

Estadio Nacional Flor Blanca, San Salvador
Referee: Carlos Esteva (Mexico)
5 December 1943

| Costa Rica | 7–0 | Nicaragua |
|---|---|---|
| Ubeita 27' (o.g.); J. Rojas 32'; Zeledón 34', 62', 76'; Granados 40'; J. L. Rojas 86' |

Estadio Nacional Flor Blanca, San Salvador
Referee: Carlos Esteva (Mexico)

7 December 1943

| Costa Rica | 2–3 | Guatemala |
|---|---|---|
| Morera 43'; Zeledón 55' | | J. Mendoza 17'; Toledo 45'; González 70' |

Estadio Nacional Flor Blanca, San Salvador
Referee: Carlos Esteva (Mexico)
7 December 1943

| El Salvador | 8–1 | Nicaragua |
|---|---|---|
| Aceituno 5', 62', 70'; Corado 15'; Ruano 28'; Deras 32'; Rivas 49', 65' | | García 80' |

Estadio Nacional Flor Blanca, San Salvador
Referee: Carlos Esteva (Mexico)

9 December 1943

| El Salvador | 4–2 | Costa Rica |
|---|---|---|
| Monterrosa 5'; Linates 60' (pen.); Torres 72'; Cruz 86' | | Zeledón 38', 84' |

Estadio Nacional Flor Blanca, San Salvador
Referee: Carlos Esteva (Mexico)
9 December 1943

| Guatemala | 6–2 | Nicaragua |
|---|---|---|
| Unknown 6' | | Unknown 2' |

Estadio Nacional Flor Blanca, San Salvador

12 December 1943

| El Salvador | 2–1 | Guatemala |
|---|---|---|
| Torres 47'; Cruz 50' | | Toledo 32' |

Estadio Nacional Flor Blanca, San Salvador
Referee: Carlos Esteva (Mexico)
12 December 1943

| Costa Rica | 3–2 | Nicaragua |
|---|---|---|
| Riggioni 42'; Á. Rojas 51'; Zeledón 55' | | Navarro 30'; García 85' |

Estadio Nacional Flor Blanca, San Salvador
Referee: Carlos Esteva (Mexico)

16 December 1943

| El Salvador | 10–1 | Nicaragua |
|---|---|---|
| Aceituno 4'; Rivas 6', 72', 85'; Cruz 12', 28', 68', 71'; Regalado 40'; Corado 70' | | García 1' |

Estadio Nacional Flor Blanca, San Salvador
Referee: Carlos Esteva (Mexico)
16 December 1943

| Guatemala | 4–2 | Costa Rica |
|---|---|---|
| del Cid 48', 65'; Castro 67'; Toledo 75' | | Zeledón 43' (pen.); J. Rojas 88' |

Estadio Nacional Flor Blanca, San Salvador

19 December 1943

| Guatemala | 5–1 | Nicaragua |
|---|---|---|
| Toledo 18', 22'; Miranda 48' (o.g.); Camposeco 53'; E. Mendoza 85' | | Morales 65' |

Estadio Nacional Flor Blanca, San Salvador
Referee: Alfonso Rivas (El Salvador)
19 December 1943

| El Salvador | 2–4 | Costa Rica |
|---|---|---|
| Corado 10'; Cruz 53' | | Á. Rojas 26'; Zeledón 66'; Riggioni 72'; Varela 84' |

Estadio Nacional Flor Blanca, San Salvador
Referee: Carlos Esteva (Mexico)

== Championship play-off ==
21 December 1943

| El Salvador | Not played | Guatemala |

Estadio Nacional Flor Blanca, San Salvador

== Goalscorers ==
There were 76 goals scored in 12 matches, for an average of 6.33 goals per match.

9 goals

- (Costa Rica) Francisco Zeledón

7 goals

- (El Salvador) Miguel Cruz
- (Guatemala) Carlos Toledo

6 goals

- (Guatemala) Unknown goalscorers

5 goals

- (El Salvador) Miguel Rivas

4 goals

- (El Salvador) José Luis Aceituno

3 goals

- (El Salvador) Rafael Corado
- (El Salvador) Luis Alonso Torres
- (Nicaragua) Ramón García

2 goals

- (Costa Rica) Mario Riggioni
- (Costa Rica) Álvaro Rojas
- (Costa Rica) Jorge Rojas
- (El Salvador) Ricardo Monterrosa
- (Guatemala) Valentín del Cid
- (Nicaragua) Unknown goalscorers

1 goal

- (Costa Rica) José Alberto Granados
- (Costa Rica) Alejandro Morera
- (Costa Rica) José Luis Rojas
- (Costa Rica) Aníbal Varela
- (El Salvador) Miguel Deras
- (El Salvador) Julián Linates
- (El Salvador) Luis Antonio Regalado
- (El Salvador) Luis Ruano
- (Guatemala) Mario Camposeco
- (Guatemala) José Castro
- (Guatemala) Muchuca González
- (Guatemala) Esteban Camposeco
- (Guatemala) Julio Mendoza
- (Nicaragua) Guillermo Morales
- (Nicaragua) Francisco Navarro

1 own goal

- (Nicaragua) Benigno Miranda (against Guatemala)
- (Nicaragua) Rafael Ubeita (against Costa Rica)

Source: RSSSF
