= 1948 CCCF Championship =

Tournament details
- Host country: Guatemala
- Dates: 29 February – 21 March
- Teams: 5
- Venue(s): Estadio Escolar, Guatemala City

Final positions
- Champions: Costa Rica (3rd title)
- Runners-up: Guatemala
- Third place: Panama
- Fourth place: Curaçao

Tournament statistics
- Matches played: 20
- Goals scored: 84 (4.2 per match)
- Top scorer: (Costa Rica) Jaime Meza (11 Goals)
- Best goalkeeper: (Costa Rica) Manuel Cantillo

The 1948 CCCF Championship was the fourth international association football championship for members of the Confederación Centroamericana y del Caribe de Fútbol (CCCF). Hosted by Guatemala, the competition ran from 29 February – 21 March 1948 and was contested by the national teams of Costa Rica, Curaçao, El Salvador, Guatemala and Panama.

Defending champions Costa Rica won the competition for the third time. In the final matches of the round-robin tournament, they were crowned champions despite losing 4–1 Curaçao as hosts Guatemala subsequently lost 5–4 to Panama.

== Background ==
The Confederación Centroamericana y del Caribe de Fútbol (CCCF) was founded in 1938. Along with the North American Football Confederation (NAFC), it was a precursor organisation to the Confederation of North, Central America and Caribbean Association Football (CONCACAF). Within three years of its founding, the CCCF organised a contest for its member associations.

Defending champions Costa Rica were the most successful team in the competition's history having won two of the three editions to date. Both previous times they had been crowned champion were as hosts in 1941 and 1946.

== Format ==
The tournament was played as a double round-robin where each team would play all of the others twice. The winner would be decided by the total number of points obtained across all matches played.

=== Participants ===
- Costa Rica
- Curaçao
- El Salvador
- Guatemala (Hosts)
- Panama

== Venue ==
All matches were held at the Estadio Escolar in Guatemala City.

Guatemala City
Estadio Escolar
Capacity: 25,000

== Summary ==
The competition began on 29 February when defending champions Costa Rica defeated El Salvador 3–1 in the opening match. Two days later, Jaime Meza scored five times as Costa Rica recorded back-to-back wins at the start of the tournament by defeating Panama 7–0. Hosts Guatemala opened the competition with a 3–0 win against El Salvador. On 4 March, Curaçao recorded a win in their first match by defeating Panama 3–1. Costa Rica and Guatemala drew 1–1. The following day, Guatemala again dropped points as they drew 2–2 with Curaçao.

On 7 March, Costa Rica extended their unbeaten start to four games with a 2–1 win against Curaçao. Panama recorded their first win as they defeated El Salvador by the same scoreline. Two days later, El Salvador recorded their first win of the tournament by defeating Curaçao 1–0. Hosts Guatemala narrowly defeated Panama 4–3 to maintain their challenge at the top. At the halfway stage of the contest, Costa Rica were top of the standings with seven points from a possible eight, one point ahead of Guatemala.

On March 11, El Salvador defeated Curaçao 2–0 and Costa Rica extended their lead at the top after defeating Panama 3–1. Two days later, Guatemala's title challenge faltered as they drew 1–1 with El Salvador, leaving them two points behind Costa Rica. The following day, Panama defeated Curaçao 5–2. On March 16, Guatemala pulled level on points with leaders Costa Rica by defeating them 3–2. Panama defeated El Salvador 2–0. Guatemala again faltered on 18 March as they drew 2–2 with Curaçao before, for the second time in the tournament, Meza scored five goals in a single game to help Costa Rica to a 6–0 win against El Salvador.

The final matches were to be played a day apart on March 20 and 21. Costa Rica went into their game against Curaçao knowning that a win would secure the title a day before nearest rivals Guatemala played Panama. However, a Pedro Coffie brace saw Curaçao run out 4–1 winners against Costa Rica leaving the door open for Guatemala to snatch the title. It wasn't to be for Guatemala though as a late winner from Antonio Morales saw Panama edge out the hosts 5–4.

== Table ==
Pos	Team	Pld	W	D	L	GF	GA	GD	Pts
1	Costa Rica	8	5	1	2	25	11	+14	11
2	Guatemala	8	3	4	1	20	16	+4	10
3	Panama	8	4	0	4	19	24	−5	8
4	Curaçao	8	2	2	4	14	16	−2	6
5	El Salvador	8	2	1	5	6	17	−11	5

== Results ==
29 February 1948

Costa Rica	3–1	El Salvador
Macho Equivel 36'; Campos 65'; Solano 75'		Torres 44'

Estadio Escolar, Guatemala City

2 March 1948

Panama	0–7	Costa Rica
		Meza 21' (?); Quedada (?); Solano 55'

Estadio Escolar, Guatemala City
2 March 1948

Guatemala	3–0	El Salvador
Galán 18', 48'; Aqueche 72'

Estadio Escolar, Guatemala City

4 March 1948

Panama	1–3	Curaçao
Tejada 47' (pen.)		Heyliger 16'; Janser 60'; Coffie 71'

Estadio Escolar, Guatemala City
4 March 1948

Guatemala	1–1	Costa Rica
Aqueche 48'		Macho Esquivel 65'

Estadio Escolar, Guatemala City

5 March 1948

Guatemala	2–2	Curaçao
Toledo 35'; Aqueche 53'		Jasen 46', 47'

Estadio Escolar, Guatemala City

7 March 1948

El Salvador	1–2	Panama
Corado 89'		Rangel 15', 29'

Estadio Escolar, Guatemala City
7 March 1948

Costa Rica	2–1	Curaçao
Campos 53'; Solano 85'		Jasen 48'

Estadio Escolar, Guatemala City

9 March 1948

Guatemala	4–3	Panama
Aqueche 10', 21'; Camposeco 35', 60'		Rangel 5', 56'; Morales 43'

Estadio Escolar, Guatemala City
9 March 1948

El Salvador	1–0	Curaçao
Monterrosa 5'

Estadio Escolar, Guatemala City

11 March 1948

Panama	1–3	Costa Rica
Morales 54'		Vargas 26'; Meza 71' (pen.); Campos 89'

Estadio Escolar, Guatemala City
11 March 1948

El Salvador	2–0	Curaçao
Palacios 20'; Ruano 84'

Estadio Escolar, Guatemala City

13 March 1948

Guatemala	1–1	El Salvador
Marroquín 80'		Monterrosa 24'

Estadio Escolar, Guatemala City

14 March 1948

Panama	5–2	Curaçao
Rangel (?); McLeary 20', 76'; Anderson (?); Morales 72'		Jansen 55'; Coffie 85'

Estadio Escolar, Guatemala City

16 March 1948

Panama	2–0	El Salvador
Fraser 15', 83'

Estadio Escolar, Guatemala City
16 March 1948

Guatemala	3–2	Costa Rica
Duran 14'; Camposeco 69'; Aqueche 77'		Campos 40'; Solado 47'

Estadio Escolar, Guatemala City

18 March 1948

El Salvador	0–6	Costa Rica
		Meza 4', 43', 48', 63', 81'; Negro Esquivel 18'

Estadio Escolar, Guatemala City
18 March 1948

Guatemala	2–2	Curaçao
Toledo 40'; Camposeco 44'		C. Isebia 5'; Conquent 75'

Estadio Escolar, Guatemala City

20 March 1948

Costa Rica	1–4	Curaçao
Bossa 85'		Heyliger 40'; Coffie 42', 80'; Krips 85'

Estadio Escolar, Guatemala City

21 March 1948

Guatemala	4–5	Panama
Galán 5'; Toledo 44'; Camposeco 48', 65'		Rangel 10'; Anderson 15'; Morales 30', 75'; Pinnock 40'

Estadio Escolar, Guatemala City
