= 1953 CCCF Championship =

Tournament details
- Host country: Costa Rica
- Dates: 8–23 March
- Teams: 7
- Venue: 1

Final positions
- Champions: Costa Rica
- Runners-up: Honduras
- Third place: Guatemala
- Fourth place: Curaçao

Tournament statistics
- Matches played: 21
- Goals scored: 77 (3.67 per match)
- Top scorer: (Honduras) Rodolfo Ramírez Godoy (8 goals)
- Best goalkeeper: (Guatemala) Gabriel Urriola

The 1953 CCCF Championship was the sixth edition of the CCCF Championship, the tournament took place from March 8 to 22, 1953 in the Costa Rican capital (San José). The champion was the host Costa Rica

Following are the results of the Final Group of the 1953 CCCF Championship, which was hosted by Costa Rica.

== Venue ==
San José
Estadio Nacional de Costa Rica
Capacity: 25,000 spectators

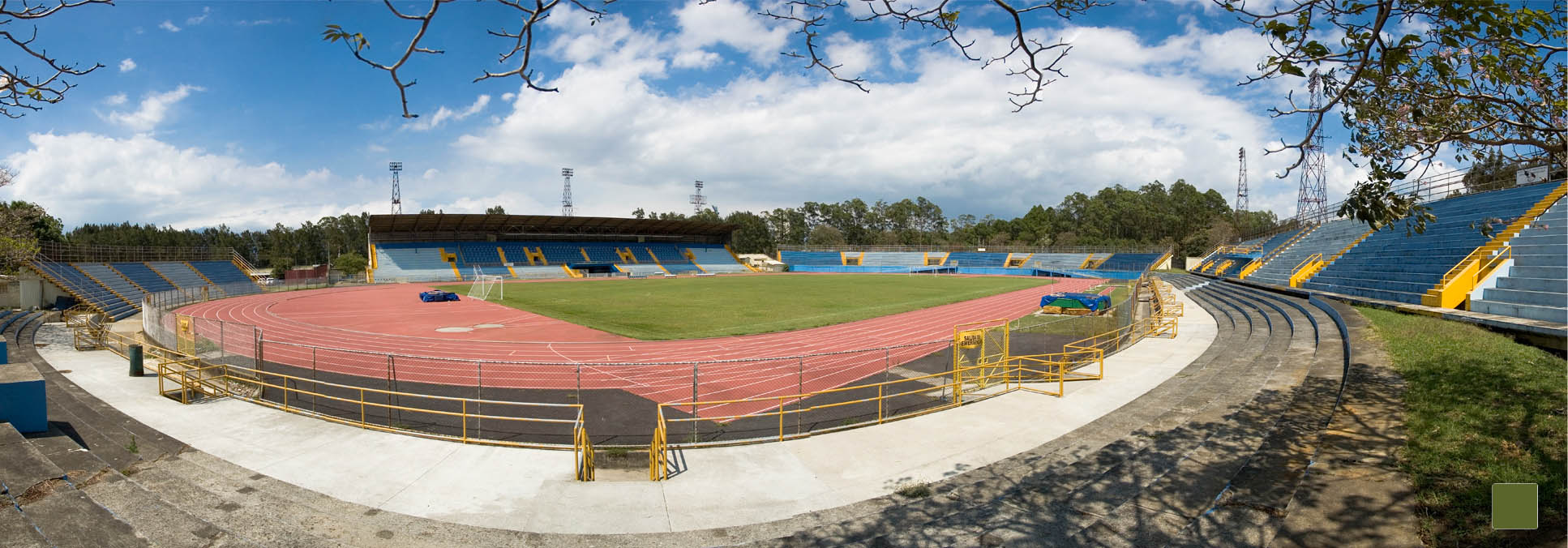
Estadio Nacional, venue

=== Referees ===
- (Chile) Sergio Bustamante
- (England) William Crawford

== Participating teams ==
Seven teams participated on the tournament

- Costa Rica (Hosts)
- Curaçao
- El Salvador
- Guatemala
- Honduras
- Nicaragua
- Panama

== Final standings ==
Pos	Team	Pld	W	D	L	GF	GA	GD	Pts
1	Costa Rica	6	6	0	0	19	2	+17	12
2	Honduras	6	4	0	2	13	10	+3	8
3	Guatemala	6	3	2	1	8	8	0	8
4	Curaçao	6	2	2	2	17	9	+8	6
5	El Salvador	6	2	1	3	10	14	−4	5
6	Nicaragua	6	1	0	5	4	18	−14	2
7	Panama	6	0	1	5	6	16	−10	1

== Results ==
8 March 1953

Honduras	2–1	Nicaragua
R.Ramírez 21', 50'		Morales 12'

Estadio Nacional de Costa Rica, San José
9 March 1953

Costa Rica	5–1	El Salvador
Solano 6', 50', 55'; Herrera 40' láscarez 68'		Miranda 60' (pen.)

Estadio Nacional de Costa Rica, San José
9 March 1953

Guatemala	1–1	Curaçao
Gracía 81'		Briezen 14'

Estadio Nacional de Costa Rica, San José
10 March 1953

El Salvador	4–1	Nicaragua
Barrazza 10'; Azucena 12'; Rivas (?); Barrios (?)		Morales 20'

Estadio Nacional de Costa Rica, San José
11 March 1953

Costa Rica	3–0	Panama
Cordero 56' (pen.); Lascarez 69'; Rodríguez 80'

Estadio Nacional de Costa Rica, San José
11 March 1953

Curaçao	8–0	Nicaragua
Kemp 2', 23'; Hato 7' (pen.), 33'; Krips 9'; Jasen 43', 77'; Bicentini 50'

Estadio Nacional de Costa Rica, San José
11 March 1953

Guatemala	1–0	Honduras
García 9'

Estadio Nacional de Costa Rica, San José
12 March 1953

Panama	2–4	Curaçao
Ponce 20'; Abab 80'		Hato 3', 23'; Gómez 21'; Lanús 73' (o.g.)

Estadio Nacional de Costa Rica, San José
13 March 1953

Costa Rica	4–1	Honduras
Goñi 20', 25'; Rodríguez 50'; Valeciano 84'		Leaky 4'

Estadio Nacional de Costa Rica, San José
14 March 1953

Guatemala	3–2	El Salvador
Osorio 12', 55'; Estrada 51'		Miranda 42' (pen.), 85'

Estadio Nacional de Costa Rica, San José
14 March 1953

Panama	0–2	Nicaragua
		Cifuentes 20'; Estrada 53'

Estadio Nacional de Costa Rica, San José
15 March 1953

El Salvador	0–3	Honduras
		R.Ramírez 7', 40'; Padilla (?)

Estadio Nacional de Costa Rica, San José
16 March 1953

Costa Rica	1–0	Curaçao
Herrera 38'

Estadio Nacional de Costa Rica, San José
17 March 1953

Costa Rica	3–0	Nicaragua
Solano 35'; Cordero 50' (pen.); Quesada 55'

Estadio Nacional de Costa Rica, San José
18 March 1953

Panama	2–2	Guatemala
Lombardo 52', 54'		García 5'; Toledo 63'

Estadio Nacional de Costa Rica, San José
19 March 1953

Guatemala	1–0	Nicaragua
Toledo 35'

Estadio Nacional de Costa Rica, San José
20 March 1953

El Salvador	2–1	Panama
Montoya 20', 40'		De Bello 57' (pen.)

Estadio Nacional de Costa Rica, San José
21 March 1953

Curaçao	3–4	Honduras
Jansen 58'; Canword 70', 86'		Molina 36' (o.g.); Zelaya 40'; Padilla 60'; R. Ramírez 65' (pen.)

Estadio Nacional de Costa Rica, San José
21 March 1953

Honduras	3–1	Panama
J. Ramírez 8'; R.Ramírez 73'; Leaky 80'		Linares 60'

Estadio Nacional de Costa Rica, San José
22 March 1953

El Salvador	1–1	Curaçao
Miranda 25'		Hato 32' (pen.)

Estadio Nacional de Costa Rica, San José
22 March 1953

Costa Rica	3–0	Guatemala
Murillo 16'; Herrera 57', 80'

Estadio Nacional de Costa Rica, San José

1953 CCCF Championship

Costa Rica
4th title

== Team of the Tournament ==
Team of the Tournament by RSSSF
Goalkeeper	Defenders	Midfielders	Forwards
(Guatemala) Gabriel Urriola	(Costa Rica) Mario Cordero (Honduras) Víctor Bernárdez (Colony of Curaçao and Dependencies) Wilfred De Lannoy (Costa Rica) Wedell Jiménez	(Costa Rica) Elías Valenciano (Guatemala) Luis Alberto González (El Salvador) Conrado Miranda	(Costa Rica) Fernando Solano (Colony of Curaçao and Dependencies) Ergilio Hato (Honduras) Rodolfo Ramírez Godoy
