= 1946 CCCF Championship =

Tournament details
- Host country: Costa Rica
- Dates: 23 February – 13 March
- Teams: 6
- Venue: 1

Final positions
- Champions: Costa Rica
- Runners-up: Guatemala
- Third place: El Salvador
- Fourth place: Honduras

Tournament statistics
- Matches played: 15
- Goals scored: 86 (5.73 per match)
- Top scorer: (Guatemala) Carlos Humberto Toledo (10 Goals)

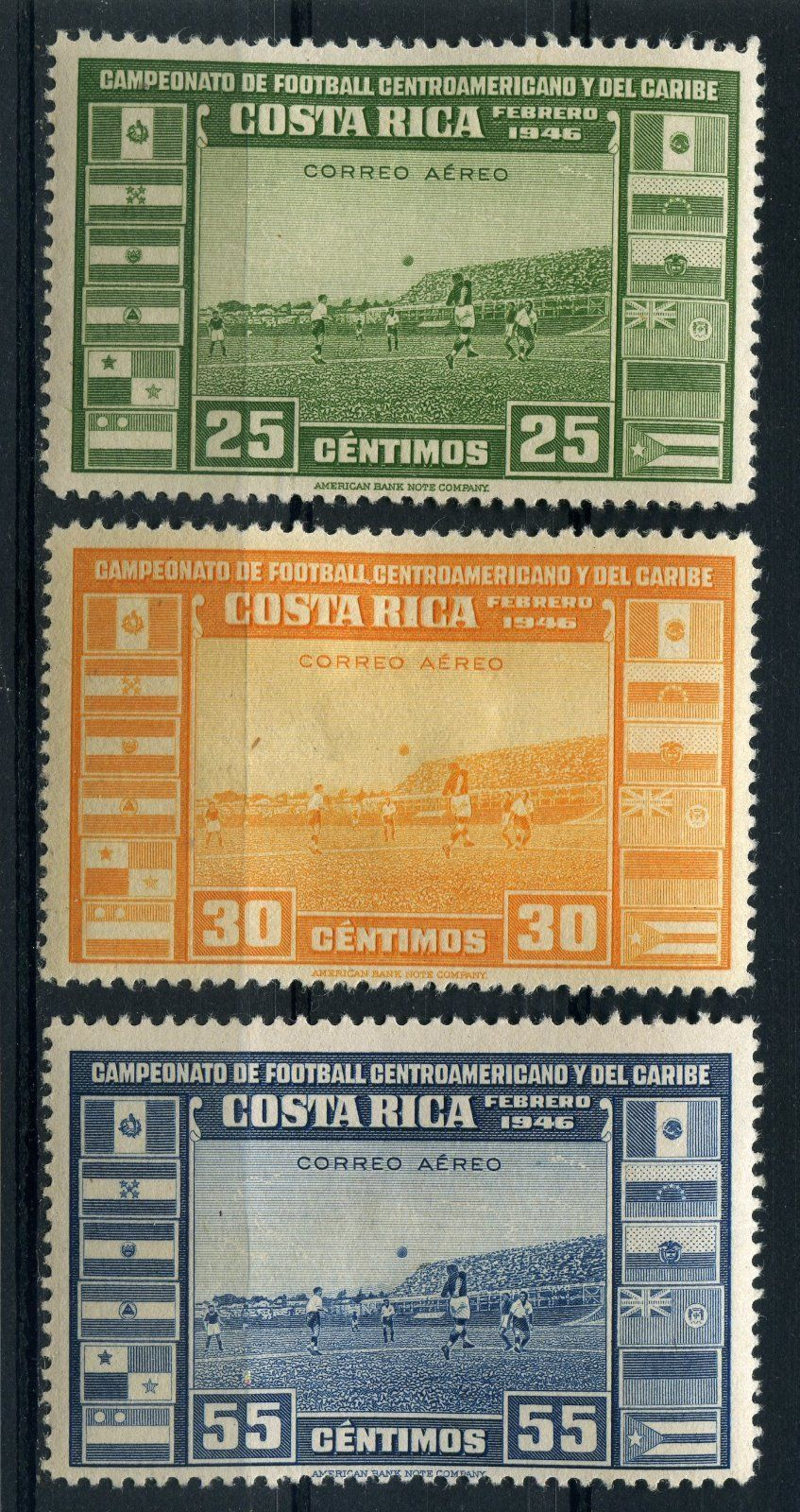
Commemorative stamps for the competition.

1946 CCCF Championship was the third edition of CCCF Championship, the tournament began on February 23 and ended on March 13, 1946. For the second consecutive year, no Caribbean countries participated. All matches were held in the capital San José, the champion was the host country Costa Rica.

== Venues ==
San José
Estadio Nacional de Costa Rica
Capacity: 25,000 spectators

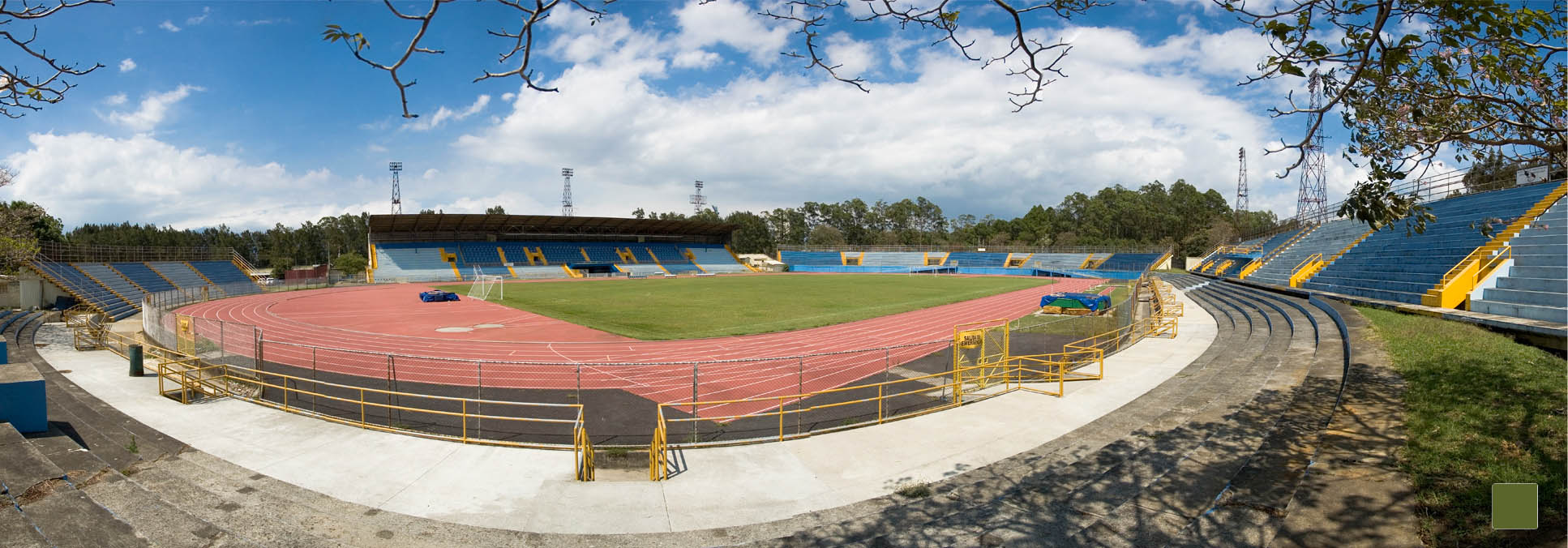
Estadio Nacional, venue

=== Referees ===
- (Costa Rica) Willey Jones
- (Hungary) Herbert Garbosky
- (Mexico) Juan López

== Participating teams ==
Six teams participated on the tournament, Honduras debuted on the tournament, No Caribbean teams entered

- Costa Rica (Hosts)
- El Salvador
- Guatemala
- Honduras (Debut)
- Nicaragua
- Panama

== Final standings ==
Pos	Team	Pld	W	D	L	GF	GA	GD	Pts
1	Costa Rica	5	4	0	1	24	6	+18	8
2	Guatemala	5	3	1	1	20	10	+10	7
3	El Salvador	5	3	0	2	15	11	+4	6
4	Honduras	5	2	0	3	17	12	+5	4
5	Panama	5	1	1	3	5	16	−11	3
6	Nicaragua	5	1	0	4	5	31	−26	2

== Results ==
23 February 1946

Guatemala	3–1	El Salvador
de león 18', 32'; Camposeco 79'		Guitiérrez 43'

Estadio Nacional de Costa Rica, San José
23 February 1946

Panama	1–0	Honduras
Ferreira 83'

Estadio Nacional de Costa Rica, San José
24 February 1946

Costa Rica	7–1	Nicaragua
Riggioni 5'; Rodríguez 25'; Umaña 52'; Murillo 64', 73'; Zamona 65'; Retana 77'		Arroligo ?'

Estadio Nacional de Costa Rica, San José
26 February 1946

Costa Rica	7–0	Panama
Rodríguez 14'; Solano 23', ?', 55', 65'; Zelodon 80'; Rojas ?'

Estadio Nacional de Costa Rica, San José
28 February 1946

Honduras	5–3	Guatemala
Sosa 32'; Arzu 40', 60', 62'		Toledo 20'; Camposeco 65'; Duran 75'

Estadio Nacional de Costa Rica, San José
28 February 1946

El Salvador	7–2	Nicaragua
Cea 6'; Corado 35', 50', 69', 78'; Rivas 64', 82'		Navarro 9'; Estrada 58'

Estadio Nacional de Costa Rica, San José
7 March 1946

Costa Rica	5–1	Honduras
Zamora 10'; Riggini 19'; Rojas 30', 62'; Rodríguez 82'		Arzu 52'

Estadio Nacional de Costa Rica, San José
7 March 1946

Panama	1–4	El Salvador
Figueroa ?'		Gutiérrez 10'; Deras 23'; Ospino 25' o.g. Torres ?'

Estadio Nacional de Costa Rica, San José
7 March 1946

Guatemala	7–0	Nicaragua
Toledo ?', ?', ?'; Unknown ?', ?', ?', ?'

Estadio Nacional de Costa Rica, San José
10 March 1946

Honduras	1–3	El Salvador
Unknown ?'		Gutiérrez ?', ?', ?'

Estadio Nacional de Costa Rica, San José
10 March 1946

Panama	0–2	Nicaragua
		Peréz ?'; Arroligo ?'

Estadio Nacional de Costa Rica, San José
10 March 1946

Costa Rica	1–4	Guatemala
García 25'		Duran 26', 48'; Toledo 58'; Camposeco 63'

Estadio Nacional de Costa Rica, San José
13 March 1946

Panama	3–3	Guatemala
Váldes 9'; Rangel 18', 20'		Toledo 38', 55', 68'

Estadio Nacional de Costa Rica, San José
13 March 1946

Honduras	10–0	Nicaragua

Estadio Nacional de Costa Rica, San José
13 March 1946

Costa Rica	4–0	El Salvador
Riggioni 39'; Rodríguez 50'; Zelodón 54', 56'

Estadio Nacional de Costa Rica, San José

1946 CCCF Championship

Costa Rica
2nd title
