= Costa Rica National Stadium (1924) =

Former stadium in San Jose, Costa Rica

Coordinates: 9°56′11.40″N 84°6′28.36″W

Estadio Nacional
- Estadio Nacional de Costa Rica
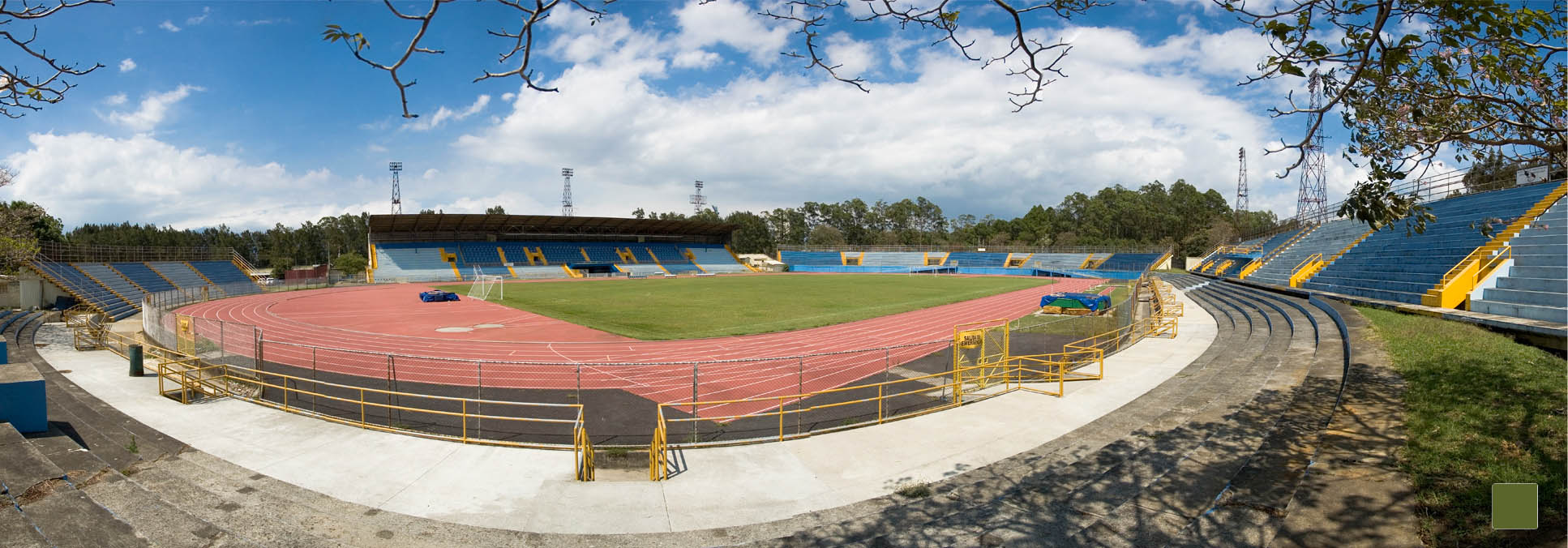
- Interactive map of Estadio Nacional
- Full name: Estadio Nacional de Costa Rica
- Location: San José, Costa Rica
- Capacity: 25,000

Construction
- Opened: 29 December 1924
- Renovated: 1976
- Expanded: 1941
- Demolished: 12 May 2008

Tenant
- Costa Rica national football team (1941–1999)

Estadio Nacional de Costa Rica (Costa Rica National Stadium) was a multi-use stadium in La Sabana, San José, Costa Rica. It was used mostly for football matches. The stadium held 25,000 and was built in 1924. It was replaced by the current National Stadium in 2011.

The stadium played host to Amnesty International's Human Rights Now! Benefit Concert on September 13, 1988. The show was headlined by Bruce Springsteen & The E Street Band

== Lasts Numbers ==
Last Development

Summer Final Quarters (2007) match between UCR and Brujas FC

Last Penalty

Reynaldo Parks (UCR) at minute 77.

Last Official Goal

The Brazilian, Ronio Martins (UCR) at minute 93.

Last Result

UCR 2 - Brujas FC 3
