= Honduras national football team results (1960–1979) =

Honduras
1960–69 season

This is a list of the Honduras national football team results from 1960 to 1979.

== 1960 ==
In 1960, Honduras participated for the first time in a FIFA World Cup qualification. On October, FIFA awarded Honduras a 0–2 win against Guatemala after they forfeited, making this the third time in the last decade in which a match is scheduled between these two but not played.

19 February 1960 CCCF	Honduras	3–3	Netherlands Antilles	Havana, Cuba
EST	Zelaya 43'; Leaky 49'; Barahona 90'		4' 88' Bibiana; 15' Dirksz	Stadium: La Tropical; Referee: Ramiro García (MEX); Record: 1–2–2 (9:11)

21 February 1960 CCCF	Honduras	1–1	Suriname	Havana, Cuba
EST	Prince 48'		60' Kamsoe	Stadium: La Tropical; Referee: Record: 0–1–0 (1:1)

25 February 1960 CCCF	Costa Rica	1–1	Honduras	Havana, Cuba
EST	Armijo 66'		18' Reyes	Stadium: La Tropical; Referee: Record: 0–1–6 (5:32)

27 February 1960 CCCF	Cuba	2–1	Honduras	Havana, Cuba
EST	García 16'; Valdés 44'		40' Leaky	Stadium: La Tropical; Referee: Record: 2–0–4 (6:17)

31 July 1960 Friendly	Cartaginés (Costa Rica)	3–3	Honduras	San Salvador, El Salvador
CST	Coto; Armijo		Moris; García; Álvarez	Referee: Record: 0–1–0 (3:3)

4 September 1960 FWCQ	Honduras	2–1	Costa Rica	Tegucigalpa, Honduras
CST	Suazo 10'; Leaky 21'		46' Rodríguez	Stadium: Estadio Tiburcio Carías Andino; Attendance: 10,730; Referee: José Sundheim (COL); Record: 1–1–6 (7:33)

11 September 1960 FWCQ	Costa Rica	5–0	Honduras	San José, Costa Rica
CST	Jiménez 31' 34'; Ulloa 42'; Rodríguez 69'; Perason 85'			Stadium: Estadio Nacional; Attendance: 40,000; Referee: José Sundheim (COL); Record: 1–1–7 (7:38)

25 September 1960 FWCQ	Honduras	1–1	Guatemala	Tegucigalpa, Honduras
CST	Suazo 59'		28' López	Stadium: Estadio Tiburcio Carías Andino; Attendance: 8,087; Referee: Roy Méndez (SLV); Record: 2–2–2 (8:15)

2 October 1960 FWCQ	Guatemala	0–2	Honduras	Guatemala City, Guatemala
CST				Stadium: Estadio Mateo Flores; Referee: Record: 3–2–2 (10:15)

== 1961 ==
14 January 1961 FWCQ	Costa Rica	1–0	Honduras	Guatemala City, Guatemala
CST	Rodríguez 29'			Stadium: Estadio Mateo Flores; Attendance: 23,340; Referee: Felipe Buergo (MEX); Record: 1–1–8 (7:39)

28 February 1961 Friendly	Honduras	4–2	Nicaragua	Tegucigalpa, Honduras
CST				Stadium: Estadio Tiburcio Carías Andino; Referee: Record: 3–0–0 (16:3)

7 March 1961 CCCF	Honduras	6–0	Nicaragua	San José, Costa Rica
CST	Enamorado 43' 60' 77'; Leaky 49'; Taylor 55'; Flores 67'			Stadium: Estadio Nacional; Attendance: 1,048; Referee: Roberto Vásquez (CRC); Record: 4–0–0 (22:3)

10 March 1961 CCCF	Honduras	4–2	Netherlands Antilles	San José, Costa Rica
CST	de Lannoy 3' (o.g.); Suazo 69'; Flores 81'; Leaky 87'		11' 41' Loran	Stadium: Estadio Nacional; Attendance: 1,027; Referee: Juan Corado (GUA); Record: 2–2–2 (13:13)

12 March 1961 CCCF	El Salvador	1–0	Honduras	San José, Costa Rica
CST	Barraza 3'			Stadium: Estadio Nacional; Attendance: 1,456; Referee: Roberto Vásquez (CRC); Record: 5–0–2 (17:10)

15 March 1961 CCCF	Costa Rica	3–0	Honduras	San José, Costa Rica
CST	Ulloa 55'; Monge 66'; Gobán 89'			Stadium: Estadio Nacional; Attendance: 11,555; Referee: Juan Corado (GUA); Record: 1–1–9 (7:42)

17 March 1961 CCCF	Haiti	0–2	Honduras	San José, Costa Rica
CST			7' Suazo; 23' Leaky	Stadium: Estadio Nacional; Attendance: 16,035; Referee: Alberto Tejeda (PER); Record: 1–0–1 (3:2)

19 March 1961 CCCF	El Salvador	5–1	Honduras	San José, Costa Rica
CST	Merlos 30' 60'; Ruano 55'; Monge 71' 85'		25' Reyes	Stadium: Estadio Nacional; Attendance: 9,200; Referee: Antoine Moscova (HAI); Record: 5–0–3 (18:15)

== 1963 ==
On 7 April, Honduras faced Costa Rica in the 1963 CONCACAF Championship, becoming at the same time, the contenders for the Unofficial Football World Championships; however, they fail to conquer the title by losing 1–2 in San Salvador.

2 March 1963 Friendly	Guatemala	1–2	Honduras	Guatemala City, Guatemala
CST				Stadium: Estadio Mateo Flores; Referee: Record: 4–2–2 (12:16)

10 March 1963 Friendly	Guatemala	2–1	Honduras	Guatemala City, Guatemala
CST	Salamanca (pen.)			Stadium: Estadio Mateo Flores; Referee: Record: 4–2–3 (13:18)

25 March 1963 CC	Honduras	1–0	Nicaragua	Santa Ana, El Salvador
CST	Rodríguez 31'			Stadium: Estadio Municipal; Referee: Record: 5–0–0 (23:3)

27 March 1963 CC	El Salvador	2–2	Honduras	Santa Ana, El Salvador
CST	Reynosa 30'; Hernández 65'		17' Guerra; 26' Barahona	Stadium: Estadio Municipal; Referee: Record: 5–1–3 (20:17)

29 March 1963 CC	Guatemala	1–2	Honduras	Santa Ana, El Salvador
CST	Contreras 9'		28' Barahona; 42' Guerra	Stadium: Estadio Municipal; Referee: Record: 5–2–3 (15:19)

31 March 1963 CC	Honduras	1–0	Panama	Santa Ana, El Salvador
CST	Edwards 46'			Stadium: Estadio Municipal; Referee: Record: 3–0–1 (6:3)

3 April 1963 CC	Honduras	1–4	Netherlands Antilles	San Salvador, El Salvador
CST	Suazo 44'			Stadium: Estadio Nacional Flor Blanca; Referee: Record: 2–2–3 (14:17)

5 April 1963 CC	El Salvador	3–0	Honduras	San Salvador, El Salvador
CST	Monge 10'; Hernández 13' 34'			Stadium: Estadio Nacional Flor Blanca; Referee: Record: 5–1–4 (20:20)

7 April 1963 CC	Costa Rica	2–1	Honduras	San Salvador, El Salvador
CST	Córdoba; Jiménez		4' Guerra	Stadium: Estadio Nacional Flor Blanca; Referee: Record: 1–1–10 (8:44)

== 1965 ==
28 February 1965 FWCQ	Honduras	0–1	Mexico	San Pedro Sula, Honduras
CST			62' Díaz	Stadium: Estadio Francisco Morazán; Attendance: 7,514; Referee: Juan Corado (GUA); Record: 0–0–3 (3:11)

4 March 1965 FWCQ	Mexico	3–0	Honduras	Mexico City, Mexico
CST	González 6'; Aussin 14'; Reyes 82'			Stadium: Estadio Azteca; Attendance: 50,894; Referee: Emilio Aguilar (GUA); Record: 0–0–4 (3:14)

11 March 1965 CCQ	Honduras	0–2	Nicaragua	San Salvador, El Salvador
CST			Girón; Barrios	Stadium: Estadio Nacional Flor Blanca; Referee: Record: 5–0–1 (23:5)

14 March 1965 CCQ	El Salvador	3–1	Honduras	San Salvador, El Salvador
CST	Monge 33'; Méndez 62'; Barraza 90'		55' Castillo	Stadium: Estadio Nacional Flor Blanca; Referee: Record: 5–1–5 (21:23)

17 March 1965 FWCQ	Honduras	0–1	United States	San Pedro Sula, Honduras
CST			70' Murphy	Stadium: Estadio Francisco Morazán; Attendance: 1,268; Referee: Guillermo Umaña (CRC); Record: 0–0–1 (0:1)

21 March 1965 FWCQ	Honduras	1–1	United States	Tegucigalpa, Honduras
CST	Taylor 85'		80' Murphy	Stadium: Estadio Tiburcio Carías Andino; Attendance: 2,331; Referee: Rodolfo Navarro (NCA); Record: 0–1–1 (1:2)

11 July 1965 Friendly	Honduras	1–1	Costa Rica	Tegucigalpa, Honduras
CST				Stadium: Estadio Tiburcio Carías Andino; Referee: Record: 1–2–10 (9:45)

== 1967 ==
1 January 1967 Friendly	Honduras	2–3	(Socialist Federal Republic of Yugoslavia) Red Star Belgrade	Tegucigalpa, Honduras
CST	Flashy 71'; Suazo 85'; Starting XI (GK) Hendricks; Deras; Edwards; Güity; Welsh; Caballero; Suazo; Fonseca; Cruz; Flashy; Flores; Substitutes; (substituted in) Máximo; (substituted in) M. Banegas; (substituted in) E. Banegas; Coach; Lecea (CHI)		23' 33' Džajić; 48' Melić; Starting XI; Racić (GK); Dakić; Karapandžić; Melić; Savković; Marković; Vratnjan; Klenkovski; Lazarević; Ostojić; Džajić; Substitutes; Mihailović (substituted in) Coach (YUG) Miljanić	Stadium: Estadio Tiburcio Carías Andino; Referee: Concepción Ayala (HON); Record: 0–0–1 (2:3)

18 January 1967 Friendly	Guatemala	3–1	Honduras	Guatemala City, Guatemala
CST				Stadium: Estadio Mateo Flores; Referee: Record: 5–2–4 (16:22)

22 January 1967 Friendly	Honduras	1–1	Guatemala	Tegucigalpa, Honduras
CST				Stadium: Estadio Tiburcio Carías Andino; Referee: Record: 5–3–4 (17:23)

5 March 1967 CC	Honduras	1–0	Trinidad and Tobago	Tegucigalpa, Honduras
CST				Stadium: Estadio Tiburcio Carías Andino; Attendance: 14,302; Referee: Record: 1–0–0 (1:0)

8 March 1967 CC	Honduras	1–1	Nicaragua	Tegucigalpa, Honduras
CST	Máximo 25'			Stadium: Estadio Tiburcio Carías Andino; Attendance: 12,221; Referee: Record: 5–1–1 (24:6)

13 March 1967 CC	Honduras	0–0	Guatemala	Tegucigalpa, Honduras
CST				Stadium: Estadio Tiburcio Carías Andino; Attendance: 17,843; Referee: Record: 5–4–4 (17:23)

16 March 1967 CC	Honduras	2–0	Haiti	Tegucigalpa, Honduras
CST	Grey			Stadium: Estadio Tiburcio Carías Andino; Attendance: 6,271; Referee: Record: 2–0–1 (5:2)

19 March 1967 CC	Honduras	0–1	Mexico	Tegucigalpa, Honduras
CST			34' Prado	Stadium: Estadio Tiburcio Carías Andino; Attendance: 15,000; Referee: Henry Landauer (USA); Record: 0–0–5 (3:15)

21 May 1967 CPOT	El Salvador	1–0	Honduras	El Salvador
CST				Referee: Record: 5–1–6 (21:24)

May 1967 CPOT	Honduras	n/p	El Salvador	Honduras
CST				Referee: Record: 5–1–6 (21:24)

== 1968 ==
17 July 1968 Friendly	Honduras	0–0	El Salvador	Honduras
CST				Referee: Record: 5–2–6 (21:24)

31 July 1968 Friendly	El Salvador	2–1	Honduras	San Salvador, El Salvador
CST	Azúcar 28'; Acevedo 55'		Gómez	Referee: Record: 5–2–7 (22:26)

5 December 1968 FWCQ	Honduras	3–1	Jamaica	Tegucigalpa, Honduras
CST	Urquía 18'; Bran 41'; Gómez 56'		Dunkley	Stadium: Estadio Tiburcio Carías Andino; Attendance: 7,441; Referee: Lawrence King (USA); Record: 2–0–0 (8:5)

8 December 1968 FWCQ	Honduras	2–0	Jamaica	Tegucigalpa, Honduras
CST	Mendoza 42'; Mejía 73'			Stadium: Estadio Tiburcio Carías Andino; Attendance: 3,577; Referee: Frank Lee (CAN); Record: 3–0–0 (10:5)

22 December 1968 FWCQ	Honduras	1–0	Costa Rica	Tegucigalpa, Honduras
CST	Gómez 32'			Stadium: Estadio Tiburcio Carías Andino; Attendance: 8,724; Referee: Michael Wurtz (USA); Record: 2–2–10 (10:45)

29 December 1968 FWCQ	Costa Rica	1–1	Honduras	San José, Costa Rica
CST	Chavarría 40'		25' (pen.) Rosales	Stadium: Estadio Nacional; Attendance: 21,636; Referee: George Cumberpath (TRI); Record: 2–3–10 (11:46)

== 1969 ==
In 1969, Honduras faced El Salvador in the semifinal round of the 1970 FIFA World Cup qualification in a period in which both nations were fighting a war over land reforms and immigration and demographic problems; the qualifying matches added more tension to a conflict that later came to be known as the Football War.

27 April 1969 Friendly	Toluca (Mexico)	2–2	Honduras	Toluca, Mexico
CST	Damián 43' 77' (pen.)		10' (a.g.) Ramos; 12' Gómez	Stadium: Estadio Nemesio Díez; Referee: Diego de Leo (MEX); Record: 0–1–0 (2:2)

8 June 1969 FWCQ	Honduras	1–0	El Salvador	Tegucigalpa, Honduras
CST	Welsh 89'			Stadium: Estadio Tiburcio Carías Andino; Attendance: 17,827; Referee: Arturo Yamasaki (PER); Record: 6–2–7 (23:26)

15 June 1969 FWCQ	El Salvador	3–0	Honduras	San Salvador, El Salvador
CST	Martínez 27' (pen.) 41'; Acevedo 29'			Stadium: Estadio Nacional Flor Blanca; Attendance: 36,470; Referee: Walter Van (ANT); Record: 6–2–8 (23:29)

27 June 1969 FWCQ	El Salvador	3–2	Honduras	Mexico City, Mexico
CST	Martínez 8' 28'; Acevedo 101'		19' 50' Cardona	Stadium: Estadio Azteca; Attendance: 15,326; Referee: Abel Aguilar (MEX); Record: 6–2–9 (25:32)

== 1970 ==
13 June 1970 Friendly	Honduras	1–0	Panama	El Progreso, Honduras
CST				Stadium: Estadio Humberto Micheletti; Referee: Record: 4–0–1 (7:3)

== 1971 ==
In 1971, after eliminating Guatemala in the qualifying phase of the 1971 CONCACAF Championship, Honduras had to face El Salvador in a home-away double header. However, due to the still fresh 1969 Football War the Cuscatlecos withdrew from the tournament, giving Honduras an automatic bye.

4 October 1971 CCQ	Honduras	1–0	Guatemala	Tegucigalpa, Honduras
CST				Stadium: Estadio Tiburcio Carías Andino; Referee: Record: 6–4–4 (18:23)

7 October 1971 CCQ	Guatemala	1–1	Honduras	Guatemala City, Guatemala
CST				Stadium: Estadio Mateo Flores; Referee: Record: 6–5–4 (19:24)

October 1971 CCQ	Honduras	n/p	El Salvador	Honduras
CST				Referee: Record: 6–2–9 (25:32)

October 1971 CCQ	El Salvador	n/p	Honduras	El Salvador
CST				Referee: Record: 6–2–9 (25:32)

21 November 1971 CC	Trinidad and Tobago	1–1	Honduras	Port of Spain, Trinidad and Tobago
AST	Douglas 18' (pen.)		28' (pen.) Matamoros	Stadium: Queen's Park Oval; Referee: Record: 1–1–0 (2:1)

23 November 1971 CC	Cuba	3–1	Honduras	Port of Spain, Trinidad and Tobago
AST	Piedra 10'; Roldán 25'; Verdecia 59'		(penalty missed) Matamoros; 60' Bran	Stadium: Queen's Park Oval; Referee: Record: 2–0–5 (7:20)

27 November 1971 CC	Costa Rica	2–1	Honduras	Port of Spain, Trinidad and Tobago
AST			Hernández	Stadium: Queen's Park Oval; Referee: Record: 2–3–11 (12:48)

1 December 1971 CC	Haiti	3–1	Honduras	Port of Spain, Trinidad and Tobago
AST	Bayonne; Sanón; Désir		Chavarría	Stadium: Queen's Park Oval; Referee: Record: 2–0–2 (6:5)

4 December 1971 CC	Honduras	1–2	Mexico	Port of Spain, Trinidad and Tobago
AST	Gómez 69'			Stadium: Queen's Park Oval; Referee: Juan Soto (CRC); Record: 0–0–6 (4:17)

== 1972 ==
3 December 1972 CCQ	Honduras	2–1	Costa Rica	Tegucigalpa, Honduras
CST	Bran 32'; Gómez 57'		40' Paniagua	Stadium: Estadio Tiburcio Carías Andino; Attendance: 16,727; Referee: Alfonso González (MEX); Record: 3–3–11 (14:49)

10 December 1972 CCQ	Costa Rica	3–3	Honduras	San José, Costa Rica
CST	Elizondo 8'; Sáenz 50'; Cárcamo 60' (pen.)		70' Urquía; 85' 90' Gómez	Stadium: Estadio Ricardo Saprissa Aymá; Attendance: 14,274; Referee: Luis Villarejo (PUR); Record: 3–4–11 (17:52)

== 1973 ==
29 November 1973 CC	Honduras	2–1	Trinidad and Tobago	Port-au-Prince, Haiti
EST	Guifarro 33'; Hernández 51'		61' David	Stadium: Stade Sylvio Cator; Attendance: 12,816; Referee: John Davies (CAN); Record: 2–1–0 (4:2)

3 December 1973 CC	Honduras	1–1	Mexico	Port-au-Prince, Haiti
EST	Guifarro 54'		73' López	Stadium: Stade Sylvio Cator; Attendance: 12,816; Referee: Werner Winsemann (CAN); Record: 0–1–6 (5:18)

7 December 1973 CC	Haiti	1–0	Honduras	Port-au-Prince, Haiti
EST	Saint-Vil 59'			Stadium: Stade Sylvio Cator; Attendance: 14,257; Referee: Werner Winsemann (CAN); Record: 2–0–3 (6:6)

12 December 1973 CC	Honduras	2–2	Netherlands Antilles	Port-au-Prince, Haiti
EST	Sosa 33'; Guifarro 50'		62' Clemencia; 73' St. Jago	Stadium: Stade Sylvio Cator; Attendance: 15,361; Referee: Kenneth Chaplin (JAM); Record: 2–3–3 (16:19)

15 December 1973 CC	Guatemala	1–1	Honduras	Port-au-Prince, Haiti
EST	Banegas 83'		15' Bran	Stadium: Stade Sylvio Cator; Attendance: 15,435; Referee: Roger Schott (USA); Record: 6–6–4 (20:25)

== 1975 ==
20 April 1975 CPOT	Honduras	0–0	Guatemala	Tegucigalpa, Honduras
CST				Stadium: Estadio Tiburcio Carías Andino; Referee: Record: 6–7–4 (20:25)

27 April 1975 CPOT	Guatemala	2–0	Honduras	Guatemala City, Guatemala
CST				Stadium: Estadio Mateo Flores; Referee: Record: 6–7–5 (20:27)

== 1977 ==
In 1977, Honduras faced a European nation for the first time when they draw 0–0 in a friendly match against Hungary.

21 February 1977 Friendly	Honduras	0–0	Hungary	Tegucigalpa, Honduras
CST				Stadium: Estadio Tiburcio Carías Andino; Referee: Record: 0–1–0 (0:0)

6 June 1977 Friendly	Honduras	1–0	Panama	Tegucigalpa, Honduras
CST				Stadium: Estadio Tiburcio Carías Andino; Referee: Record: 5–0–1 (8:3)

12 June 1977 Friendly	Honduras	1–3	West Germany B	Tegucigalpa, Honduras
CST			Frank; Burgsmüller	Stadium: Estadio Tiburcio Carías Andino; Referee: Juan Soto (CRC); Record: 0–0–1 (1:3)

== 1978 ==
17 October 1978 Friendly	Mexico	1–4	Honduras	Mexico City, Mexico
CST			Lacayo; Soto	Stadium: Estadio Olímpico Universitario; Attendance: 4,000; Referee: Record: 1–1–6 (9:19)

== Record ==
Record does not include matches against domestic clubs.

Description	Record	Goals
1960s record	16–12–21	60:71
1970s record	6–8–7	25:28
All-time record	38–23–46	153:198
