= El Salvador national football team results (1950–1969) =

Results of the El Salvador national football team

This article provides details of international football games played by the El Salvador national football team from 1950 to 1969.

== 1950 ==
26 February 1950 1950 CACG Round 1	El Salvador	0–1	Costa Rica	Guatemala City, Guatemala
10:00 UTC−6			Retena 85' (pen.)	Stadium: Estadio de la Revolución; Referee: Giuseppe Carpani (Italy)

28 February 1950 1950 CACG Round 1	El Salvador	4–1	Nicaragua	Guatemala City, Guatemala
20:00 UTC−6	Durán 12', 53'; Corado 46', 48'		Ubieta 24'	Stadium: Estadio de la Revolución

1 March 1950 1950 CACG Round 1	Netherlands Antilles	1–1	El Salvador	Guatemala City, Guatemala
22:00 UTC−6	Heyliger 55'		Lucha 16'	Stadium: Estadio de la Revolución

3 March 1950 1950 CACG Round 1	El Salvador	1–0	Haiti	Guatemala City, Guatemala
20:00 UTC−6	Herrera (?)			Stadium: Estadio de la Revolución

9 March 1950 1950 CACG Round 2	Netherlands Antilles	1–2	El Salvador	Guatemala City, Guatemala
20:00 UTC−6	Krips 82'		Corado 21'; Lucha 75'	Stadium: Estadio de la Revolución

11 March 1950 1950 CACG Round 2	El Salvador	1–2	Honduras	Guatemala City, Guatemala
20:00 UTC−6	Corado 38'		Velásquez 6'; Godoy Ramírez 38'	Stadium: Estadio de la Revolución

13 March 1950 1950 CACG Round 2	Guatemala	2–0	El Salvador	Guatemala City, Guatemala
22:00 UTC−6	Galán 78'; Aqueche 86'			Stadium: Estadio de la Revolución

== 1953 ==
8 March 1953 1953 CCCF Championship	Costa Rica	5–1	El Salvador	San José, Costa Rica
	Solano 6', 50', 55'; Herrera 40'; Láscarez 68'		Miranda 67' (pen.)	Stadium: Estadio Nacional

10 March 1953 1953 CCCF Championship	El Salvador	4–1	Nicaragua	San José, Costa Rica
	Barraza 12'; Azucena 23'; Barrios 43', 77'		Morales 20'	Stadium: Estadio Nacional; Referee: William Crawford (England)

13 March 1953 1953 CCCF Championship	Guatemala	3–2	El Salvador	San José, Costa Rica
	Osorio 12', 55'; Estrada 51'		Miranda 42' (pen.); Pineda 85'	Stadium: Estadio Nacional; Referee: Sergio Bustamante (Chile)

15 March 1953 1953 CCCF Championship	El Salvador	0–3	Honduras	San José, Costa Rica
			Ramírez 7', 40'; Padilla (?)	Stadium: Estadio Nacional; Referee: William Crawford (England)

19 March 1953 1953 CCCF Championship	El Salvador	2–1	Panama	San José, Costa Rica
	Montoya 20', 40'		de Bello 57' (pen.)	Stadium: Estadio Nacional; Referee: Sergio Bustamante (Chile)

21 March 1953 1953 CCCF Championship	El Salvador	1–1	Netherlands Antilles	San José, Costa Rica
	Miranda 25'		Hato 32' (pen.)	Stadium: Estadio Nacional; Referee: Sergio Bustamante (Chile)

== 1954 ==
9 March 1954 1954 CACG	El Salvador	2–2	Colombia	Mexico City, Mexico
	Barrios 1'; Barraza 53'		Rengifo 31', 75'	Referee: William Crawford (England)

12 March 1954 1954 CACG	El Salvador	3–1	Cuba	Mexico City, Mexico
	Ruano 9'; Montoya 19'; Barraza 34'		Nazabel 39'	Referee: Luis Montes de Oca (Uruguay)

14 March 1954 1954 CACG	Mexico	2–3	El Salvador	Mexico City, Mexico
	Jasso 27'; Gutiérrez 64'		Montoya 16', 36'; Valencia 37'	Referee: Godfrey Sunderland (England)

17 March 1954 1954 CACG	El Salvador	1–0	Panama	Mexico City, Mexico
	Barraza 41'			Referee: Luis Montes de Oca (Uruguay)

== 1955 ==
15 August 1955 1955 CCCF Championship	Guatemala	2–3	El Salvador	Tegucigalpa, Honduras
	Ruano 45', 47'		Barraza 17'; Ruano 20', 48'	Stadium: Estadio Nacional; Referee: Reginald Leafe (England)

17 August 1955 1955 CCCF Championship	Honduras	3–1	El Salvador	Tegucigalpa, Honduras
	Enamorado 39', 89'; Ramírez Godoy 69'		Ruano 33'	Stadium: Estadio Nacional; Referee: Reginald Leafe (England)

19 August 1955 1955 CCCF Championship	Costa Rica	4–0	El Salvador	Tegucigalpa, Honduras
	Cordero 16' (pen.); González 50'; Herrera 76', 85'			Stadium: Estadio Nacional; Referee: Reginald Leafe (England)

21 August 1955 1955 CCCF Championship	El Salvador	2–1	Cuba	Tegucigalpa, Honduras
	Barraza 30', 80'		Gutiérrez 60' (pen.)	Stadium: Estadio Nacional

24 August 1955 1955 CCCF Championship	El Salvador	2–0	Aruba	Tegucigalpa, Honduras
	Valencia 8'; Barraza 63'			Stadium: Estadio Nacional; Referee: John Clough (England)

26 August 1955 1955 CCCF Championship	Curaçao	3–0	El Salvador	Tegucigalpa, Honduras
	Bicentini 26' (pen.); Schoop 80'; Jansen 87'			Stadium: Estadio Nacional

== 1961 ==
6 March 1961 1961 CCCF Championship	Netherlands Antilles	0–0	El Salvador	San José, Costa Rica
				Stadium: Estadio Nacional; Attendance: 3,292; Referee: Roberto Vásquez (Costa Rica)

9 March 1961 1961 CCCF Championship	El Salvador	10–2	Nicaragua	San José, Costa Rica
	Ruano 5' (pen.); Barraza 14', 15', 26', 80'; Cubas 30'; Monge 40', 52'; Hernández 69', 74'		Tamáriz 27'; Dávila 60'	Stadium: Estadio Nacional; Attendance: 1,334; Referee: Alberto Tejada Burga (Peru)

12 March 1961 1961 CCCF Championship	El Salvador	1–0	Honduras	San José, Costa Rica
	Barraza 3'			Stadium: Estadio Nacional; Attendance: 1,456; Referee: Juan José Corado (Guatemala)

15 March 1961 1961 CCCF Championship	El Salvador	2–0	Haiti	San José, Costa Rica
	Hernández 2'; Ruano 59'			Stadium: Estadio Nacional; Attendance: 11,555; Referee: Alberto Tejada Burga (Peru)

17 March 1961 1961 CCCF Championship	Costa Rica	4–0	El Salvador	San José, Costa Rica
	Rojas 6'; Quesada 39'; Ulloa 50'; Gámez 52'			Stadium: Estadio Nacional; Attendance: 16,035; Referee: Juan José Corado (Guatemala)

19 March 1961 1961 CCCF Championship	El Salvador	5–1	Honduras	San José, Costa Rica
	Merlos 30', 60'; Ruano 55'; Monge 71', 85'		Rodríguez 25'	Stadium: Estadio Nacional; Attendance: 9,200; Referee: Antoine Moscova (Haiti)

== 1963 ==
23 March 1963 1963 CONCACAF Championship	El Salvador	6–1	Nicaragua	San Salvador, El Salvador
	Hernández 4'; Monge 21', 63'; Ruiz 75', 87'; Ruano 81'		Mendieta 89'	Stadium: Estadio Nacional Flor Blanca; Referee: Juan Soto París (Costa Rica)

25 March 1963 1963 CONCACAF Championship	El Salvador	1–1	Panama	San Salvador, El Salvador
	Hernández 87'		Velasco 82' (o.g.)	Stadium: Estadio Nacional Flor Blanca; Referee: Saúl de la Rosa (Colombia)

27 March 1963 1963 CONCACAF Championship	El Salvador	2–2	Honduras	San Salvador, El Salvador
	Reynosa 30'; Hernández 65'		Guerra 16'; Suazo 27'	Stadium: Estadio Nacional Flor Blanca; Referee: Saúl de la Rosa (Colombia)

31 March 1963 1963 CONCACAF Championship	El Salvador	1–1	Guatemala	San Salvador, El Salvador
	Hernández 24'		Peña 28'	Stadium: Estadio Nacional Flor Blanca; Referee: Fernando Buergo (Mexico)

3 April 1963 1963 CONCACAF Championship	El Salvador	1–4	Costa Rica	San Salvador, El Salvador
	Chacón 49'		González 17', 22', 72'; Pearson 76'	Stadium: Estadio Nacional Flor Blanca; Attendance: 35,000; Referee: Saúl de la Rosa (Colombia)

5 April 1963 1963 CONCACAF Championship	El Salvador	3–0	Honduras	San Salvador, El Salvador
	Monge 10'; Hernández 13', 34'			Stadium: Estadio Nacional Flor Blanca; Attendance: 35,000; Referee: Saúl de la Rosa (Colombia)

7 April 1963 1963 CONCACAF Championship	El Salvador	3–2	Netherlands Antilles	San Salvador, El Salvador
	Hernández 14', 80'; González 60'		Testing 7'; J.M. Pablo 78'	Stadium: Estadio Nacional Flor Blanca; Attendance: 35,000; Referee: Juan José Corado (Guatemala)

5 August 1963 Friendly	Jamaica	0–1	El Salvador	Jamaica
			Pineda (?)

7 August 1963 Friendly	Jamaica	0–0	El Salvador	Jamaica

9 August 1963 Friendly	Jamaica	1–1	El Salvador	Jamaica
	? (?)		? (?)

== 1965 ==
10 March 1965 1965 CONCACAF Championship Q.	El Salvador	4–0	Nicaragua	San Salvador, El Salvador
	González 49', 67', 84'; Barraza 63'			Stadium: Estadio Nacional Flor Blanca; Referee: Rómulo Estrada (Guatemala)

14 March 1965 1965 CONCACAF Championship Q.	El Salvador	3–1	Honduras	San Salvador, El Salvador
	Monge 33'; Méndez 43'; Barraza 63'		Grey 54'	Stadium: Estadio Nacional Flor Blanca; Referee: Juan José Corado (Guatemala)

28 March 1965 1965 CONCACAF Championship	Mexico	2–0	El Salvador	Guatemala City, Guatemala
	Díaz 22'; Valdivia 55'			Stadium: Estadio Doroteo Guamuch Flores; Attendance: 50,000; Referee: Martín Araya (Costa Rica)

30 March 1965 1965 CONCACAF Championship	El Salvador	1–1	Netherlands Antilles	Guatemala City, Guatemala
	Hernández 8'		Sillie 59'	Stadium: Estadio Doroteo Guamuch Flores; Referee: Rafael Valenzuela (Mexico)

4 April 1965 1965 CONCACAF Championship	Guatemala	4–1	El Salvador	Guatemala City, Guatemala
	Paz 16'; Eduardo de León 31'; Valdéz 40'; Clark 88'		Méndez 58'	Stadium: Estadio Doroteo Guamuch Flores; Attendance: 55,000; Referee: Diego Di Leo (Mexico)

8 April 1965 1965 CONCACAF Championship	Costa Rica	1–2	El Salvador	Guatemala City, Guatemala
	Hernández 63' (pen.)		Rodríguez 44', 60'	Stadium: Estadio Doroteo Guamuch Flores; Referee: Diego Di Leo (Mexico)

11 April 1965 1965 CONCACAF Championship	El Salvador	3–1	Haiti	Guatemala City, Guatemala
	Méndez 37'; Barraza 50'; González 73'		Saint-Vil 22'	Stadium: Estadio Doroteo Guamuch Flores; Referee: Martín Araya (Costa Rica)

== 1966 ==
25 March 1966 Friendly	Panama	1–0	El Salvador	Panama
	? (?)

== 1967 ==
10 October 1967 Friendly	El Salvador	2–0	Haiti	San Salvador, El Salvador
	Méndez (?); ? (?)			Stadium: Estadio Nacional Flor Blanca

22 October 1967 Friendly	El Salvador	0–1	Guatemala	San Salvador, El Salvador
			? (?)	Stadium: Estadio Nacional Flor Blanca; Attendance: 20,000

29 October 1967 Friendly	El Salvador	3–1	Costa Rica	San Salvador, El Salvador
	Barraza 24'; Flores 80'; Díaz 90'		? (?)	Stadium: Estadio Nacional Flor Blanca

5 November 1967 Friendly	El Salvador	1–3	Guatemala	San Salvador, El Salvador
	Martínez (?)		? (?); ? (?); ? (?)	Stadium: Estadio Nacional Flor Blanca

== 1968 ==
7 May 1968 Friendly	El Salvador	3–0	Guatemala	San Salvador, El Salvador
	Azúcar (?); Méndez 52'; Morales 76'			Stadium: Estadio Nacional Flor Blanca

7 July 1968 Friendly	Honduras	0–0	El Salvador	Honduras

31 July 1968 Friendly	El Salvador	2–1	Honduras	San Salvador, El Salvador
	Azúcar 28'; Acevedo 55'		? (?)	Stadium: Estadio Nacional Flor Blanca

15 August 1968 Friendly	El Salvador	1–0	Guatemala	San Salvador, El Salvador
	González 55'			Stadium: Estadio Nacional Flor Blanca; Attendance: 20,000

11 September 1968 Friendly	El Salvador	1–1	Costa Rica	San Salvador, El Salvador
	Rodríguez 53'		? (?)	Stadium: Estadio Nacional Flor Blanca

14 November 1968 Friendly	Costa Rica	3–0	El Salvador	San José, Costa Rica
	? (?); ? (?); ? (?)			Stadium: Estadio Nacional

1 December 1968 1970 FIFA World Cup qualification	El Salvador	6–0	Suriname	San Salvador, El Salvador
	Estrada 23', 84'; Azúcar 56', 88'; Barraza 87'; Martínez 90'			Stadium: Estadio Nacional Flor Blanca; Attendance: 10,037; Referee: De Gourville (Trinidad and Tobago)

12 December 1968 1970 FIFA World Cup qualification	El Salvador	1–0	Netherlands Antilles	San Salvador, El Salvador
	Quintanilla 28'			Stadium: Estadio Nacional Flor Blanca; Attendance: 12,205; Referee: Di Salvatore (United States)

15 December 1968 1970 FIFA World Cup qualification	El Salvador	2–1	Netherlands Antilles	San Salvador, El Salvador
	Martínez 58'; Barraza 83'		Martina (?)	Stadium: Estadio Nacional Flor Blanca; Attendance: 13,059; Referee: De Gourville (Trinidad and Tobago)

22 December 1968 1970 FIFA World Cup qualification	Suriname	4–1	El Salvador	Paramaribo, Suriname
	Lagadeau (?); Oosthuizen (?); Schal (?)		González 7'	Attendance: 4,327

== 1969 ==
9 February 1969 Friendly	El Salvador	1–3	Hungary	San Salvador, El Salvador
	Rodríguez (?)		? (?); ? (?); ? (?)	Stadium: Estadio Nacional Flor Blanca

14 May 1969 Friendly	El Salvador	1–4	Peru	San Salvador, El Salvador
	Rodríguez 15'		? (?); ? (?); ? (?); ? (?)	Stadium: Estadio Nacional Flor Blanca

8 June 1969 1970 FIFA World Cup qualification	Honduras	1–0	El Salvador	Tegucigalpa, Honduras
	Wells 89'			Stadium: Estadio Nacional Chelato Uclés; Attendance: 17,827; Referee: Yamasaki (Mexico)

15 June 1969 1970 FIFA World Cup qualification	El Salvador	3–0	Honduras	San Salvador, El Salvador
	Martínez 27' (pen.), 41'; Acevedo 29'			Stadium: Estadio Nacional Flor Blanca; Attendance: 36,470; Referee: Van Rosberg (Netherlands Antilles)

26 June 1969 1970 FIFA World Cup qualification	El Salvador	3–2 (a.e.t.)	Honduras	Mexico City, Mexico
	Martínez 8', 28'; Quintanilla 101'		Cardona 19'; Gómez 50'	Stadium: Estadio Azteca; Attendance: 15,326; Referee: Abel Aguilar Elizalde (Mexico)

14 September 1969 Friendly	El Salvador	2–1	Costa Rica	San Salvador, El Salvador
	Acevedo (?); Rodríguez (?)		? (?)	Stadium: Estadio Nacional Flor Blanca

21 September 1969 1970 FIFA World Cup qualification	Haiti	1–2	El Salvador	Port-au-Prince, Haiti
	François (?)		Acevedo (?); Rodríguez (?)	Stadium: Stade Sylvio Cator; Attendance: 10,415; Referee: Yamasaki (Mexico)

28 September 1969 1970 FIFA World Cup qualification	El Salvador	0–3	Haiti	San Salvador, El Salvador
			Désir 20'; François 40'; Barthélemy 44'	Stadium: Estadio Nacional Flor Blanca; Attendance: 36,403; Referee: Elizalde (Mexico)

8 October 1969 1970 FIFA World Cup qualification	El Salvador	1–0 (a.e.t.)	Haiti	Kingston, Jamaica
	Martínez 104'			Stadium: National Stadium; Attendance: 6,742; Referee: Keith Dustan (Bermuda)

== Head-to-head record ==
Head to head records
Opponent	Pld	W	D	L	GF	GA	W%	D%	L%
Aruba	1	1	0	0	2	0	100	0	0
Colombia	1	0	1	0	2	2	0	100	0
Costa Rica	10	3	1	6	10	25	30	10	60
Cuba	2	2	0	0	5	2	100	0	0
Curaçao	1	0	0	1	0	3	0	0	100
Guatemala	9	3	1	5	12	16	33.33	11.11	55.56
Haiti	7	6	0	1	11	4	85.71	0	14.29
Honduras	13	7	2	4	24	16	53.85	15.38	30.77
Hungary	1	0	0	1	1	3	0	0	100
Jamaica	3	1	2	0	2	1	33.33	66.67	0
Mexico	2	1	0	1	3	4	50	0	50
Netherlands Antilles	8	4	4	0	11	7	50	50	0
Nicaragua	5	5	0	0	28	5	100	0	0
Panama	4	2	1	1	4	3	50	25	25
Peru	1	0	0	1	1	4	0	0	100
Suriname	2	1	0	1	7	5	50	0	50
Totals	70	36	12	22	123	97	51.43	17.14	31.43
