= 1966 FIFA World Cup qualification (CONCACAF) =

Tournament details
- Dates: 16 January 1965 - 22 May 1965
- Teams: 9 (from 1 confederation)

Tournament statistics
- Matches played: 24
- Goals scored: 68 (2.83 per match)
- Attendance: 370,238 (15,427 per match)
- Top scorer: (Mexico) Isidoro Díaz (5 goals)

FIFA rejected the entry of Guatemala because their application was submitted after the deadline.

== Format ==
There would be two rounds of play:

- First round: The remaining nine teams were divided into three groups of three teams each. The teams played against each other on a home-and-away basis. The group winners advanced to the final round.
- Final round: The three teams played against each other on a home-and-away basis. The group winner qualified.

== First round ==
=== Group 1 ===
Pos	Team	Pld	W	D	L	GF	GA	GD	Pts	Qualification
1	Jamaica	4	2	1	1	4	2	+2	5	Qualification for final round
2	Netherlands Antilles	4	1	2	1	2	3	−1	4	
3	Cuba	4	1	1	2	3	4	−1	3	

Source: AllWorldCup
Rules for classification: Tiebreakers
16 January 1965

Jamaica	2–0	Cuba
Black 11'; Blair 51'

Kingston, Jamaica
Attendance: 10,100
Referee: Boniua (Costa Rica)

20 January 1965

Netherlands Antilles	1–1	Cuba
Sille 50'		Piedra 73'

Kingston, Jamaica
Attendance: 4,005
Referee: Gómez (Honduras)

23 January 1965

Jamaica	2–0	Netherlands Antilles
Dunkley 11', 64'

Kingston, Jamaica
Attendance: 12,264
Referee: Gómez (Honduras)

30 January 1965

Cuba	0–1	Netherlands Antilles
		Sille 27'

Havana, Cuba
Attendance: 3,040
Referee: Buergo (Mexico)

3 February 1965

Netherlands Antilles	0–0	Jamaica

Havana, Cuba
Attendance: 1,218
Referee: Buergo (Mexico)

7 February 1965

Cuba	2–1	Jamaica
Santos 1' (pen.); Martínez 6'		Dunkley 14'

Havana, Cuba
Attendance: 1,176
Referee: Garcia (Mexico)

Jamaica advanced to the final round.

=== Group 2 ===
Pos	Team	Pld	W	D	L	GF	GA	GD	Pts	Qualification
1	Costa Rica	4	4	0	0	9	1	+8	8	Qualification for final round
2	Suriname	4	1	0	3	8	9	−1	2	
3	Trinidad and Tobago	4	1	0	3	5	12	−7	2	

Source: AllWorldCup
Rules for classification: Tiebreakers
7 February 1965

Trinidad and Tobago	4–1	Suriname
Gellineau 2'; Corneal 28'; Aleong 38', 46'		Haltman 4'

Port of Spain, Trinidad and Tobago
Attendance: 3,272
Referee: Koetsier (Netherlands Antilles)

12 February 1965

Costa Rica	1–0	Suriname
Rodríguez 55'

San José, Costa Rica
Attendance: 12,868
Referee: McKeand (Jamaica)

21 February 1965

Costa Rica	4–0	Trinidad and Tobago
Hernández 28' (pen.), 50'; Daniels 80'; Marín 84'

San José, Costa Rica
Attendance: 10,133
Referee: Valenzuela (Mexico)

28 February 1965

Suriname	1–3	Costa Rica
Krenten 71'		Marín 10', 70'; Soto 27'

Paramaribo, Suriname
Attendance: 7,704
Referee: Ortega (Venezuela)

7 March 1965

Trinidad and Tobago	0–1	Costa Rica
		Hernández 29'

Port of Spain, Trinidad and Tobago
Attendance: 3,293
Referee: Figaroa (Netherlands Antilles)

14 March 1965

Suriname	6–1	Trinidad and Tobago
Haltman 9', 19'; Waterval (?); Kluivert 31'; Krenten 44'		Sookram

Paramaribo, Suriname
Attendance: 3,417
Referee: Osorio Katzenstein (Venezuela)

Costa Rica advanced to the final round.

=== Group 3 ===
Pos	Team	Pld	W	D	L	GF	GA	GD	Pts	Qualification
1	Mexico	4	3	1	0	8	2	+6	7	Qualification for final round
2	United States	4	1	2	1	4	5	−1	4	
3	Honduras	4	0	1	3	1	6	−5	1	

Source: AllWorldCup
Rules for classification: Tiebreakers
28 February 1965

Honduras	0–1	Mexico
		Díaz 62'

San Pedro Sula, Honduras
Attendance: 7,514
Referee: Corado (Guatemala)

4 March 1965

Mexico	3–0	Honduras
González 6'; Aussín 14'; Reyes 82'

Mexico City, Mexico
Attendance: 50,894
Referee: Méndez (Guatemala)

7 March 1965

United States	2–2	Mexico
Schmotolocha 49'; Bicek 59'		González 34'; Reyes 65'

Los Angeles, United States
Attendance: 19,337
Referee: Morgan (Canada)

12 March 1965

Mexico	2–0	United States
Díaz 9'; Navarro 57'

Mexico City, Mexico
Attendance: 64,285
Referee: Gutierrez (Nicaragua)

17 March 1965

Honduras	0–1	United States
		Murphy 70'

San Pedro Sula, Honduras
Attendance: 1,268
Referee: Moreno (Nicaragua)

21 March 1965

United States	1–1	Honduras
Murphy 80'		Taylor 85'

Tegucigalpa, Honduras
Attendance: 2,331
Referee: Vargas (Costa Rica)

Mexico advanced to the final round.

== Final round ==
Pos	Team	Pld	W	D	L	GF	GA	GD	Pts	Qualification
1	Mexico	4	3	1	0	12	2	+10	7	Qualification for 1966 FIFA World Cup
2	Costa Rica	4	1	2	1	8	2	+6	4	
3	Jamaica	4	0	1	3	3	19	−16	1	

Source: AllWorldCup
Rules for classification: Tiebreakers
25 April 1965

Costa Rica	0–0	Mexico

San José, Costa Rica
Attendance: 20,654
Referee: Morgan (Canada)

3 May 1965

Jamaica	2–3	Mexico
Asher Welch 11'; Bartlett 36'		Padilla 13'; Cisneros 71'; Jáuregui 81'

Kingston, Jamaica
Attendance: 8,138
Referee: Montes de Oca (Guatemala)

7 May 1965

Mexico	8–0	Jamaica
Cisneros 17', 89'; Fragoso 20', 70'; Díaz 32', 41', 90'; Padilla 67'

Mexico City, Mexico
Attendance: 52,017
Referee: Navarro (Nicaragua)

11 May 1965

Costa Rica	7–0	Jamaica
Jiménez 40'; Daniels 54', 85'; Quirós 63', 77', 88'; Hernández 73'

San José, Costa Rica
Attendance: 4,003
Referee: Giebner (United States)

16 May 1965

Mexico	1–0	Costa Rica
Cisneros 16'

Mexico City, Mexico
Attendance: 64,276
Referee: Morgan (Canada)

22 May 1965

Jamaica	1–1	Costa Rica
Art Welch 70'		Daniels 6'

Kingston, Jamaica
Attendance: 3,031
Referee: Carcamo (Honduras)

Mexico qualified.

== Qualified teams ==
The following team from CONCACAF qualified for the final tournament.

Team	Qualified as	Qualified on	Previous appearances in FIFA World Cup
Mexico	Final round winners	22 May 1965	5 (1930, 1950, 1954, 1958, 1962)

== Goalscorers ==
5 goals

- (Mexico) Isidoro Díaz

4 goals

- (Costa Rica) Errol Daniels
- (Costa Rica) Leonel Hernández
- (Mexico) Ernesto Cisneros

3 goals

- (Costa Rica) Edgar Marín
- (Costa Rica) William Quirós
- (Jamaica) Lascelles Dunkley
- (Suriname (Kingdom of the Netherlands)) Siegfried Haltman

2 goals

- (Mexico) José Luis González Dávila
- (Mexico) Javier Fragoso
- (Mexico) Aarón Padilla Gutiérrez
- (Mexico) Salvador Reyes Monteón
- (Netherlands Antilles) Virgilio Sille
- (Suriname (Kingdom of the Netherlands)) Stanley Humbert Krenten
- (Suriname (Kingdom of the Netherlands)) Edmund Waterval
- (Trinidad and Tobago) Andy Aleong
- (United States) Ed Murphy

1 goal

- (Costa Rica) Fernando Jiménez
- (Costa Rica) Tarcisio Rodríguez Viquez
- (Costa Rica) Juan González Soto
- (Cuba) Nicolás Martínez
- (Cuba) Ángel Piedra
- (Cuba) Antonio dos Santos
- (Honduras) José Ricardo Taylor
- (Jamaica) Syd Bartlett
- (Jamaica) Oscar Black
- (Jamaica) Patrick Blair
- (Jamaica) Art Welch
- (Jamaica) Asher Welch
- (Mexico) José Luis Aussin
- (Mexico) Ignacio Jáuregui
- (Mexico) Ramiro Navarro
- (Suriname (Kingdom of the Netherlands)) Kenneth Kluivert
- (Trinidad and Tobago) Alvin Corneal
- (Trinidad and Tobago) Jeff Gellineau
- (Trinidad and Tobago) Bobby Sookram
- (United States) Helmut Bicek
- (United States) Walt Schmotolocha
