= Top goalscorers in Costa Rican Primera División =

The following is a list of top scorers of the Costa Rican Primera División, the top tier of the Costa Rican football pyramid.

Season	Top scorer	Club	Goals	Win #
1925	(Costa Rica) Claudio Arguedas	Herediano	5	1
1929	(Costa Rica) Rafael Ángel Madrigal	La Libertad	8	1
1938	(Costa Rica) Alfredo Piedra (Costa Rica) José Meza	Orión; Cartaginés	11	1; 1
1939	(Costa Rica) Alejandro Morera Soto	Alajuelense	23	1
1940	(Costa Rica) José Meza	Cartaginés	13	2
1941	(Costa Rica) José Cordero (Costa Rica) Jesús Araya	Gimnástica Española; Orión	7	1; 1
1942	(Costa Rica) Gonzalo Fernández (Costa Rica) Fernando Solano	Gimnástica Española; Cartaginés	18	1; 1
1943	(Costa Rica) Francisco Zeledón	La Libertad	16	1
1945	(Costa Rica) Walker Rodríguez	Orión	18	1
1948	(Costa Rica) Virgilio Muñoz	Herediano	11	1
1949	(Costa Rica) Francisco Zeledón	Alajuelense	19	2
1950	(Costa Rica) Alberto Armijo	Universidad	25	1
1951	(Costa Rica) Marco Ovares (Costa Rica) Alexis Goñi (Costa Rica) Jaime Meza	Herediano; Cartaginés; Cartaginés	17	1; 1; 1
1952	(Costa Rica) José Miguel Zeledón (Costa Rica) Jaime Meza (Costa Rica) José Meza (Costa Rica) "Macho" Zúñiga	Orión; Cartaginés; Cartaginés; Uruguay de Coronado	7	1; 2; 3; 1
1953	(Costa Rica) Rodolfo Herrera	Saprissa	12	1
1955	(Costa Rica) Mardoqueo González	La Libertad	16	1
1957	(Costa Rica) Juan Soto	Alajuelense	12	1
1958	(Costa Rica) José Luis Soto	Alajuelense	21	1
1959	(Costa Rica) Juan Ulloa	Alajuelense	18	1
1960	(Costa Rica) Juan Ulloa	Alajuelense	19	2
1961 Federal	(Costa Rica) Alberto Armijo	Cartaginés	16	2
1961 ASOFUTBOL	(Costa Rica) Jorge Bolaños (Costa Rica) Eduardo Meléndez (Costa Rica) José "Chito" Soto	El Carmen; Uruguay de Coronado; El Carmen	2	1; 1; 1
1962	(Costa Rica) Jorge "Cuty" Monge (Costa Rica) Rubén Jiménez	Saprissa; Saprissa	12	1; 1
1963	(Costa Rica) Guillermo Elizondo	Uruguay de Coronado	15	1
1964	(Costa Rica) Errol Daniels	Alajuelense	24	1
1965	(Costa Rica) Errol Daniels	Alajuelense	31	2
1966	(Costa Rica) Errol Daniels (Costa Rica) Juan Ulloa	Alajuelense; San Carlos	30	3; 3
1967	(Costa Rica) Errol Daniels	Alajuelense	41	4
1968	(Costa Rica) Errol Daniels (Costa Rica) Eduardo Chavarría	Alajuelense; Saprissa	24	5; 1
1969	(Costa Rica) Roy Sáenz	Alajuelense	24	1
1970	(Costa Rica) Errol Daniels	Alajuelense	25	6
1971	(Costa Rica) Roy Sáenz	Alajuelense	29	2
1972	(Brazil) Odir Jacques	Saprissa	18	1
1973	(Costa Rica) Leonel Hernández	Cartaginés	16	1
1974	(Costa Rica) Fernando Montero	Herediano	19	1
1975	(Costa Rica) Óscar Cordero	Alajuelense	17	1
1976	(Costa Rica) Carlos Solano	Saprissa	24	1
1977	(Uruguay) Miguel Mansilla	Saprissa	25	1
1978	(Costa Rica) Gerardo Gutiérrez	Municipal Puntarenas	23	1
1979	(Costa Rica) Howard Rooper (Peru) Carlos Izquierdo	Limonense; Turrialba	13	1; 1
1980	(Costa Rica) Carlos Torres	Alajuelense	15	1
1981	(Costa Rica) Evaristo Coronado	Saprissa	23	1
1982	(Costa Rica) Guillermo Guardia	Saprissa	20	1
1983	(Costa Rica) Juan Pablo Chacón	San Carlos	17	1
1984	(Costa Rica) Jorge Manuel Ulate	Alajuelense	17	1
1985	(Costa Rica) Jorge Manuel Ulate	Alajuelense	21	2
1986	(Costa Rica) Leony Flores	Municipal Puntarenas	18	1
1987	(Costa Rica) Claudio Jara	Herediano	19	1
1988	(Costa Rica) Evaristo Coronado	Saprissa	19	2
1989	(Costa Rica) Érick Rodríguez	Uruguay de Coronado	14	1
1991	(Brazil) Adonis Hilario	Saprissa	26	1
1992	(Costa Rica) Javier Astúa	Municipal Puntarenas	15	1
1992-93	(Brazil) Nildeson de Melo	Herediano	21	1
1993-94	(Costa Rica) Javier Astúa	Municipal Puntarenas	21	2
1994-95	(Costa Rica) Juan Carlos Arguedas	Alajuelense	28	1
1995-96	(Costa Rica) Rónald Gómez	Alajuelense	27	1
1996-97	(Costa Rica) Allan Oviedo	Herediano	26	1
1997-98	(Uruguay) Alejandro Larrea	Saprissa	20	1
1998-99	(Slovakia) Josef Miso (Argentina) Adrián Mahía	Alajuelense; Saprissa	21	1; 1
1999-00	(Costa Rica) Juan Carlos Arguedas	Carmelita/Herediano	23	2
2000-01	(Costa Rica) Mínor Díaz	Herediano	21	1
2001-02	(Costa Rica) Jhonny Cubero	San Carlos	19	1
2002-03	(Uruguay) Claudio Ciccia	Cartaginés	41	1
2003-04	(Costa Rica) Álvaro Saborío	Saprissa	25	1
2004-05	(Costa Rica) Randall Brenes	Cartaginés	16	1
2005-06	(Costa Rica) Kurt Bernard	Puntarenas	22	1
2006-07	(Costa Rica) Alonso Solís	Saprissa	16	1
2007 Invierno	(Costa Rica) Víctor Núñez	Alajuelense	11	1
2008 Verano	(Costa Rica) Alejandro Alpízar	Saprissa	13	1
2008 Invierno	(Costa Rica) Víctor Núñez	Liberia Mía	12	2
2009 Verano	(Costa Rica) Mario Camacho (Costa Rica) Andy Herron	Puntarenas; Herediano	10	1; 1
2009 Invierno	(Costa Rica) Víctor Núñez	Liberia Mía	10	3
2010 Verano	(Costa Rica) Alejandro Sequeira	Saprissa	11	1
2010 Invierno	(Costa Rica) Éver Alfaro (Costa Rica) Randall Brenes	Pérez Zeledón; Cartaginés	10	1; 2
2011 Verano	(Costa Rica) Mínor Díaz	Universidad	12	2
2011 Invierno	(Costa Rica) Randall Brenes	Cartaginés	13	3
2012 Verano	(Costa Rica) Cristian Lagos (Uruguay) José Carlos Cancela	Santos de Guápiles; Herediano	10	1; 1
2012 Invierno	(Costa Rica) Cristian Lagos	Santos de Guápiles	18	2
2013 Verano	(Costa Rica) Víctor Núñez	Herediano	13	4
2013-14	(Costa Rica) Víctor Núñez	Herediano	20	5
