= 1960 CCCF Championship =

Tournament details
- Host country: Cuba
- Dates: 14–29 February
- Teams: 5
- Venue: 1

Final positions
- Champions: Costa Rica
- Runners-up: Netherlands Antilles
- Third place: Honduras
- Fourth place: Suriname

Tournament statistics
- Matches played: 11
- Goals scored: 38 (3.45 per match)
- Top scorer: (Costa Rica) Alberto Armijo (5 Goals)

The 1960 CCCF Championship was the ninth edition of the CCCF Championship. The tournament took place from February 14 to 29, 1960, in Havana, Cuba.

== Final standings ==
| Pos | Team | Pld | W | D | L | GF | GA | GD | Pts | Qualification |
|---|---|---|---|---|---|---|---|---|---|---|
| 1 | Costa Rica (Q) | 4 | 2 | 2 | 0 | 10 | 3 | +7 | 6 | Playoff |
| 2 | Netherlands Antilles (Q) | 4 | 2 | 2 | 0 | 9 | 7 | +2 | 6 | Playoff |
| 3 | Honduras | 4 | 0 | 3 | 1 | 6 | 7 | −1 | 3 | |
| 4 | Suriname | 4 | 1 | 1 | 2 | 4 | 5 | −1 | 3 | |
| 5 | Cuba | 4 | 1 | 0 | 3 | 5 | 12 | −7 | 2 | |

(Q) Qualified for the phase indicated

== Venue ==
La Habana
Estadio Cerveza La Tropical
Capacity: 10 000 Attendance
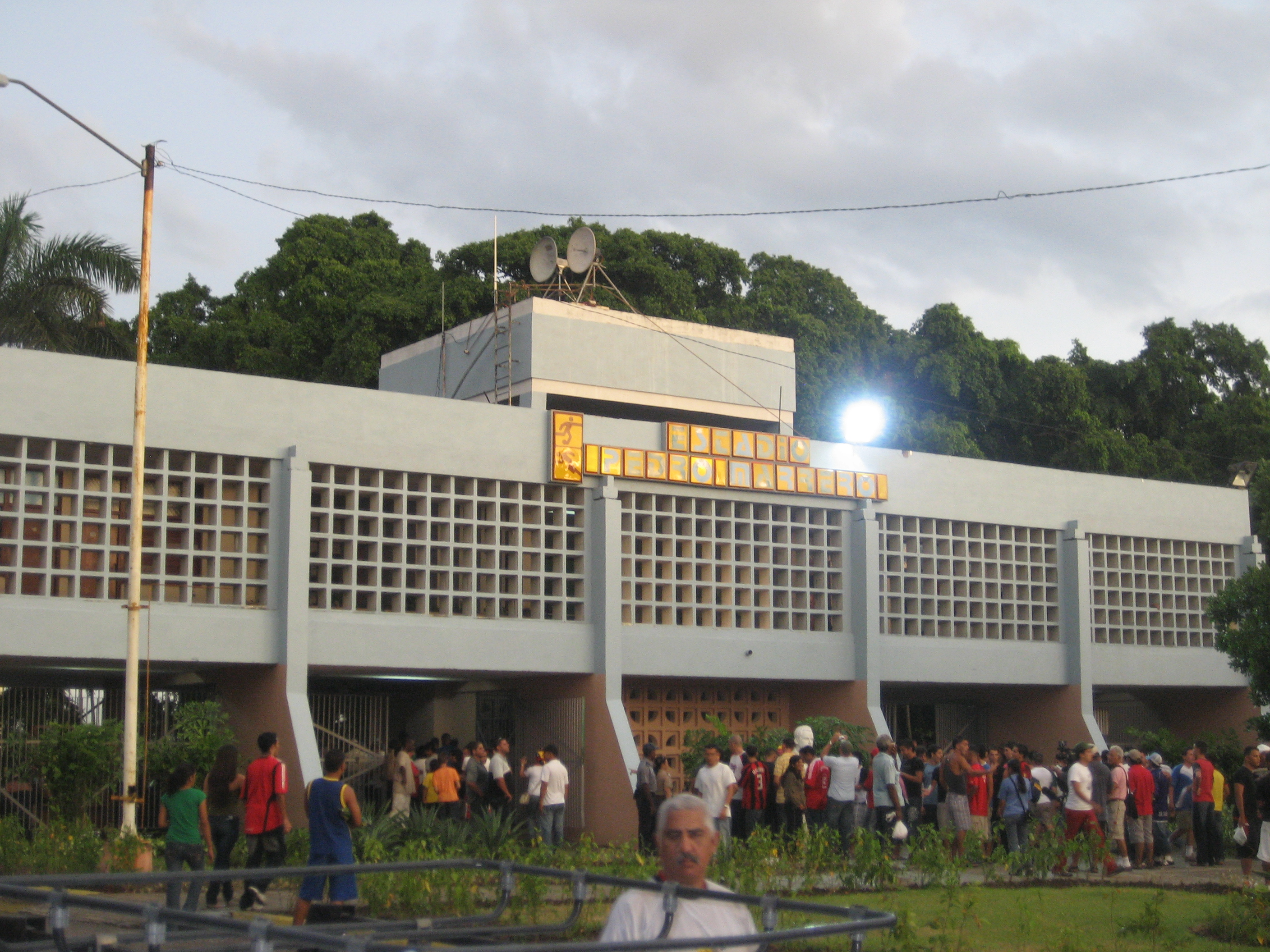

== Teams ==
Five teams entered, Suriname Debuted on the tournament

- Costa Rica
- Cuba (Hosts)
- Netherlands Antilles
- Honduras
- Suriname (Debut)

=== Withdraws ===
- Haiti Withdrew before the tournament began, the fixtures had already announced
- Guatemala Withdrew due to internal difficulties
- El Salvador Withdrew earlier before the tournament began

== Results ==
14 February 1960

| Netherlands Antilles | 1–1 | Costa Rica |
|---|---|---|
| Regales 22' | | Jiménez 3' |

Estadio Pedro Marrero, Havana
Attendance: 8,000
Referee: Ramiro García (Mexico)

15 February 1960

| Suriname | 2–0 | Cuba |
|---|---|---|
| Foe A Man 27', 79' |

Estadio Pedro Marrero, Havana
Attendance: 1,000
Referee: Alfredo Penman (Honduras)

17 February 1960

| Costa Rica | 3–1 | Suriname |
|---|---|---|
| Jiménez 16'; Armijo 39'; Gamez 74' | | Wooter 44' |

Estadio Pedro Marrero, Havana
Referee: Ramiro García (Mexico)

19 February 1960

| Honduras | 3–3 | Netherlands Antilles |
|---|---|---|
| Zelaya 43'; Leaky 47'; Padilla 89' | | Bibiana 4'; Dirksz 15'; Werleman 88' |

Estadio Pedro Marrero, Havana
Referee: Ramiro García (Mexico)

21 February 1960

| Honduras | 1–1 | Suriname |
|---|---|---|
| Prince 46' | | Kamsoe 60' |

Estadio Pedro Marrero, Havana
Referee: Ramiro García (Mexico)
21 February 1960

| Cuba | 0–5 | Costa Rica |
|---|---|---|
| | | Armijo 9' (pen.), 46'; Gamez 48'; Bejarano 77'; Ulloa 89' |

Estadio Pedro Marrero, Havana
Attendance: 10,000
Referee: Francisco Figaroa (Netherlands Antilles)

23 February 1960

| Cuba | 3–4 | Netherlands Antilles |
|---|---|---|
| Bobadilla 53'; Perez 54', 83' | | Bibiana 12', 70'; Vos 16'; La Rosa 44' |

Estadio Pedro Marrero, Havana
Attendance: 2,000
Referee: Alfredo Penman (Honduras)

25 February 1960

| Costa Rica | 1–1 | Honduras |
|---|---|---|
| Armijo 76' | | Reyes 18' |

Estadio Pedro Marrero, Havana
Referee: Ramiro García (Mexico)

27 February 1960

| Suriname | 0–1 | Netherlands Antilles |
|---|---|---|
| | | Regales 79' |

Estadio Pedro Marrero, Havana
Referee: Alfredo Penman (Honduras)
27 February 1960

| Cuba | 2–1 | Honduras |
|---|---|---|
| Valdés 16', 44' | | Leaky 40' |

Estadio Pedro Marrero, Havana

=== Playoff ===
29 February 1960

| Costa Rica | 4–0 | Netherlands Antilles |
|---|---|---|
| Ulloa 40', 79'; Armijo 53' (pen.); Jiménez 59' |

Estadio Pedro Marrero, Havana
Referee: Ramiro García (Mexico)

1960 CCCF Championship

Costa Rica
6th title

Costa Rica qualifies to the 1960 Panamerican Championship

== Team of the Tournament ==
Ideal XI by RSSSF
| Goalkeeper | Defenders | Midfielders | Forwards |
|---|---|---|---|
| (Netherlands Antilles) Paul Diaz | (Costa Rica) Giovanni Rodriguez (Netherlands Antilles) Jose La Rosa (Suriname (Kingdom of the Netherlands)) August Wooter | (Honduras) Abraham Pavón (Cuba) Ramón Peñalver (Honduras) Ronald Leaky | (Netherlands Antilles) Carlos Regales (Costa Rica) Alberto Armijo (Netherlands Antilles) Jose Bibiana (Costa Rica) Rubén Jiménez |
