= 1968 CONCACAF Pre-Olympic Tournament qualification =

North American football tournament

The qualifying competition for the 1968 CONCACAF Pre-Olympic Tournament determined the four teams of the final tournament, which decides the teams that would qualify for the 1968 Summer Olympics football finals tournament in Mexico. The qualifying competition consisted of thirteen teams, with Bermuda, Canada, Cuba, El Salvador, Haiti, Honduras, Suriname, Trinidad and Tobago and United States in the first round, while Costa Rica, Guatemala and Netherlands Antilles gets a bye to the second round. The teams played home-and-away knockout matches. Costa Rica, El Salvador, Guatemala and Trinidad and Tobago qualified for the tournament after defeating Haiti 6–3, Cuba 5–1, Bermuda 2–1 on playoffs and Netherlands Antilles 7–0 on aggregate in the final round, respectively.

== Summary ==
Team 1	Agg.	Team 2	1st leg	2nd leg
First round
Bermuda	2–1	United States	1–1	1–0
Cuba	3–2	Canada	1–1	2–1
Dominican Republic	0–14	Haiti	0–8	0–6
El Salvador	w/o	Honduras	1–0	—
Trinidad and Tobago	w/o	Suriname	1–0	2–5
Second round
Costa Rica	5–4	Haiti	3–1	2–3
El Salvador	5–1	Cuba	3–0	2–1
Guatemala	1–1	Bermuda	1–1	0–0
Trinidad and Tobago	4–3	Netherlands Antilles	0–3	4–0
Second round play-off
Bermuda	1–2	Guatemala		

== First round ==
21 May 1967

Bermuda	1–1	United States
Daniels (?)		Benedek (?)

Prospect Stadium Hamilton
Referee: Harry Sadler (Canada)
27 May 1967

United States	0–1	Bermuda

Soldier Field, Chicago
Referee: Harry Sadler (Canada)

Bermuda won 2–1 on aggregate and advanced to the second round.

21 June 1967

Cuba	1–1	Canada
Verdecia 30'		Hansen 75' (pen.)

Clarke Stadium, Edmonton
Referee: Raúl Osorio Castillo (Mexico)
24 June 1967

Canada	1–2	Cuba
Hansen 57'		Fariñas 82', 87'

Clarke Stadium, Edmonton

Cuba won 3–2 on aggregate and advanced to the second round.

1 April 1967

Dominican Republic	0–8	Haiti

Santo Domingo
22 April 1967

Haiti	6–0	Dominican Republic
Breton 10', 15'; Jacquot 26', 66'; Domingue 71', 73'

Stade Sylvio Cator, Port-au-Prince
Referee: Karl Stewart (Jamaica)

Haiti won 14–0 on aggregate and advanced to the second round.

22 April 1967

El Salvador	1–0	Honduras

Estadio Nacional (Flor Blanca), San Salvador, El Salvador

Honduras	w/o	El Salvador

El Salvador won on walkover and advanced to the second round.

21 May 1967

Trinidad and Tobago	1–0	Suriname
Small 57'

Queen's Park Oval, Port of Spain
12 June 1967

Suriname	5–2	Trinidad and Tobago

André Kamperveen Stadion, Paramaribo

Initially, Suriname won 5–3 on aggregate, but on June 19, 1967, the Trinidad and Tobago Football Association protested to FIFA about two players in Suriname's lineup, Siegfried Haltman and Armand Monsanto, who had already played professionally in Brazil and the Netherlands respectively. On August 17, 1967, FIFA ruled that Haltman had indeed played professionally in Brazil, for which Suriname was disqualified and Trinidad and Tobago advanced to the second round.

== Second round ==
8 October 1967

Costa Rica	3–1	Haiti
Alfaro 30'; Hernández 33', 36'		Pierre 61'

Estadio Nacional de la Sabana, San José
Referee: Valentín Gazo (Nicaragua)

9 December 1967

Haiti	3–2	Costa Rica
Désir 46'; Saint-Vil 57' (pen.), 72' (pen.)		Sáenz 53'; Hernández 62'

Stade Sylvio Cator, Port-au-Prince
Referee: Karl Stewart (Jamaica)

Costa Rica won 5–4 on aggregate and qualified for the final tournament.

26 November 1967

El Salvador	3–0	Cuba
Flores 15'; Díaz 30'; Méndez 75'

Estadio Nacional (Flor Blanca), San Salvador
Referee: Laurence Kingz (United States Soccer Federation)
2 December 1967

Cuba	1–2	El Salvador
Dalmau 38'		Flores 42'; Barraza 68'

Estadio Pedro Marrero, Havana

El Salvador won 5–1 on aggregate and qualified for the final tournament.

3 December 1967

Guatemala	1–1	Bermuda
Chacón 52'		Romaine 43'

Estadio Mateo Flores, Ciudad de Guatemala
Referee: Aristóteles Gómez (Honduras)
10 December 1967

Bermuda	0–0 (a.e.t.)	Guatemala

Prospect Stadium, Hamilton, Bermuda
Referee: Audley Brandt (Jamaica)

Match abandoned at 107' due to lack of light.

=== Play-off ===
3 March 1968

Bermuda	1–2 (a.e.t.)	Guatemala
Romaine 25'		Alemán 90'; Roldán 105'

Estadio Nacional (Flor Blanca), San Salvador
Referee: Abel Aguilar Elizalde (Mexico)

Guatemala won the play-off and qualified for the final tournament.

3 November 1967

Netherlands Antilles	3–0	Trinidad and Tobago
Sillé 32'; Martina 50', 56'

Ergilio Hato Stadium, Willemstad
Referee: Sergio Chechelef (Venezuelan Football Federation)
12 November 1967

Trinidad and Tobago	4–0	Netherlands Antilles
Corneal 6'; Small 19', 89'; Flores 69' (o.g.)

Queen's Park Oval, Port of Spain

Trinidad and Tobago won 4–3 on aggregate and qualified for the final tournament.

== Goalscorers ==
There were 58 goals scored in 18 matches, for an average of 3.22 goals per match.

3 goals

- (Costa Rica Olympic football team) Francisco Hernández
- (Trinidad and Tobago Olympic football team) Patrick Small

2 goals

- (Canada Olympic national soccer team) Harold Hansen
- (Cuba Olympic football team) Francisco Fariñas
- (Haiti Olympic football team) Edner Breton
- (Haiti Olympic football team) Jean Jacquot
- (Haiti Olympic football team) Leintz Domingue
- (Haiti Olympic football team) Guy Saint-Vil
- (El Salvador Olympic football team) Mario Flores
- (Bermuda Olympic football team) Irving Romaine
- (Netherlands Antilles Olympic football team) Antonio Martina

1 goal

- (Bermuda Olympic football team) Gladwin Daniels
- (United States men's national under-23 soccer team) Jim Benedek
- (Cuba Olympic football team) José Verdecia
- (Costa Rica Olympic football team) Edgar Núñez Alfaro
- (Haiti Olympic football team) Joseph Pierre
- (Haiti Olympic football team) Jean-Claude Désir
- (Costa Rica Olympic football team) Roy Sáenz
- (El Salvador Olympic football team) Ricardo Díaz
- (El Salvador Olympic football team) Sergio Méndez
- (Cuba Olympic football team) Marcos Dalmau
- (El Salvador Olympic football team) Juan Francisco Barraza
- (Guatemala Olympic football team) Edgar Chacón
- (Guatemala Olympic football team) Reginaldo Alemán
- (Guatemala Olympic football team) Jorge Roldán
- (Netherlands Antilles Olympic football team) George Sillé
- (Trinidad and Tobago Olympic football team) Alvin Corneal

1 own goal

- (Netherlands Antilles Olympic football team) Clemente Flores
