= 1968 CONCACAF Pre-Olympic Tournament =

North American football tournament

Tournament details
- Dates: 19 May – 2 June
- Teams: 4 (from 1 confederation)

Tournament statistics
- Matches played: 4
- Top scorer: (El Salvador) Juan Martínez (3 goals)

The 1968 CONCACAF Pre-Olympic Tournament was the second edition of the CONCACAF Pre-Olympic Tournament, the quadrennial, international football tournament organised by the CONCACAF to determine which national teams from the North, Central America and Caribbean region qualify for the Olympic football tournament.

Mexico, as host nation, qualified directly for the 1968 Summer Olympics together with final round winners, El Salvador and Guatemala as CONCACAF representatives.

== Qualification ==
=== Qualified teams ===
The following teams qualified for the final tournament.

Zone	Country	Method of qualification	Appearance^{1}	Last appearance	Previous best performance	Previous Olympic appearances (last)
Central America	Guatemala	Second round winners	1st	0 (debut)	Debutant	0
Central America	El Salvador	Second round winners	1st	0 (debut)	Debutant	0
Central America	Costa Rica	Second round winners	1st	0 (debut)	Debutant	0
Caribbean	Trinidad and Tobago	Second round winners	1st	0 (debut)	Debutant	0

^{1} Only final tournament.

== Final round ==
Team 1	Agg.	Team 2	1st leg	2nd leg
El Salvador	4–1	Trinidad and Tobago	2–0	2–1
Guatemala	3–3 (l)	Costa Rica	1–0	2–3

19 May 1968

El Salvador	2–0	Trinidad and Tobago
Martínez 5'; Méndez 25'

Estadio Nacional (Flor Blanca), San Salvador
26 May 1968

Trinidad and Tobago	1–2	El Salvador
(?)		Martínez 7', 20'

Queens Park Oval, Port of Spain

El Salvador won 4–1 on aggregate and qualified for the 1968 Summer Olympics.

26 May 1968

Guatemala	1–0	Costa Rica
Valdez 29'

Estadio Mateo Flores, Guatemala City
2 June 1968

Costa Rica	3–2 (a.e.t.)	Guatemala
Hernández 18' (pen.), 47'; Elizondo 99'		Roldán 5'; Torres 93'

Estadio Nacional de la Sabana, San José

Guatemala advance via a coin toss after a 3–3 aggregate and qualified for the 1968 Summer Olympics.

== Qualified teams for Summer Olympics ==
The following three teams from CONCACAF qualified for the 1968 Summer Olympics, including Mexico which qualified as hosts.

Team	Qualified on	Previous appearances in Summer Olympics^{2}
Mexico	18 October 1963	3 (1928, 1948, 1964)
El Salvador	26 May 1968	0 (debut)
Guatemala	2 June 1968	0 (debut)

^{2} Bold indicates champions for that year. Italic indicates hosts for that year.

== Goalscorers ==
There were 11 goals scored in 4 matches, for an average of 2.75 goals per match.

3 goals

- (El Salvador national football team) Juan Ramón Martínez

2 goals

- (Costa Rica Olympic football team) Leonel Hernández

1 goal

- (El Salvador Olympic football team) Sergio Méndez
- (Guatemala Olympic football team) Carlos Valdez
- (Guatemala Olympic football team) Jorge Roldán
- (Guatemala national football team) Hugo Torres
- (Costa Rica national football team) Wálter Elizondo
