= Football at the 1954 Central American and Caribbean Games =

Tournament details
- Host country: Mexico
- Dates: 9–17 March
- Teams: 5 (from 2 confederations)
- Venue: 1 (in 1 host city)

Final positions
- Champions: El Salvador (1st title)
- Runners-up: Mexico
- Third place: Colombia
- Fourth place: Panama

Tournament statistics
- Matches played: 10
- Goals scored: 33 (3.3 per match)
- Top scorer(s): (Colombia) Fernando Rengifo (4 goals)
- All statistics correct as of 17 March 1954.

Football was contested for men only at the 1954 Central American and Caribbean Games in Mexico City, Mexico.

The gold medal was won by El Salvador who earned 7 points.

== Participating teams ==
Team	Appearance	Previous best performance
Colombia	4th	Gold medal (1946)
Cuba	3rd	Gold medal (1930)
El Salvador	5th	Bronze medal (1935)
Mexico	4th	Gold medal (1935, 1938)
Panama	3rd	Silver medal (1946)

== Medal winners ==
Event	Gold	Silver	Bronze
Men's football	El Salvador (ESA)	Mexico (MEX)	Colombia (COL)

== Table ==
A 2 point system used.

Pos	Team	Pld	W	D	L	GF	GA	GD	Pts
1	El Salvador (C)	4	3	1	0	9	5	+4	7
2	Mexico	4	3	0	1	11	3	+8	6
3	Colombia	4	2	1	1	6	5	+1	5
4	Panama	4	1	0	3	5	7	−2	2
5	Cuba	4	0	0	4	2	13	−11	0

(C) Champions

== Results ==
8 March 1954
CST

Mexico	4–0	Cuba
del Águila 18'; Jasso 43' de la Mora 44'; Vázquez 53'	Report

Estadio Olímpico Universitario, Mexico City, Mexico
Referee: William Crawford (England)

9 March 1954
CST

El Salvador	2–2	Colombia
Barrios 1'; Barraza 53'	Report	Rengifo 31', 75'

Estadio Olímpico Universitario, Mexico City, Mexico
Referee: William Crawford (England)

10 March 1954
CST

Mexico	4–0	Panama
Calderón de la Barca 11', 64', 66' del Águila 67'	Report

Estadio Olímpico Universitario, Mexico City, Mexico
Referee: Godfrey Sunderland (England)

12 March 1954
CST

El Salvador	3–1	Cuba
Ruano 9'; Montoya 19'; Barraza 34'	Report	Nazabel 39'

Estadio Olímpico Universitario, Mexico City, Mexico
Referee: Luis Montes de Oca (Uruguay)

13 March 1954
CST

Colombia	2–1	Panama
Dueñas 18'; Rengifo 78'	Report	de Bello 87' (pen.)

Estadio Olímpico Universitario, Mexico City, Mexico
Referee: William Crawford (England)

14 March 1954
CST

Mexico	2–3	El Salvador
Jasso 27'; Gutiérrez 64'	Report	Montoya 16', 36'; Valencia 37'

Estadio Olímpico Universitario, Mexico City, Mexico
Referee: Godfrey Sunderland (England)

15 March 1954
CST

Panama	4–0	Cuba
Torres 22'; Valdés 26'; Lemus 48'; Lombardo 84'	Report

Estadio Olímpico Universitario, Mexico City, Mexico
Referee: Luis Montes de Oca (Uruguay)

16 March 1954
CST

Mexico	1–0	Colombia
del Águila 20'	Report

Estadio Olímpico Universitario, Mexico City, Mexico
Referee: William Crawford (England)

17 March 1954
CST

El Salvador	1–0	Panama
Barraza 41'	Report

Estadio Olímpico Universitario, Mexico City, Mexico
Referee: Luis Montes de Oca (Uruguay)

18 March 1954
CST

Cuba	1–2	Colombia
Nazabel 2'	Report	Díaz 6'; Rengifo 32'

Estadio Olímpico Universitario, Mexico City, Mexico
Referee: Godfrey Sunderland (England)

1954 Central American
and Caribbean Games

El Salvador
1st title

== Statistics ==
=== Goalscorers ===
There were 33 goals scored in 10 matches, for an average of 3.3 goals per match.

4 goals

- (Colombia) Fernando Rengifo

3 goals

- (El Salvador) Juan Francisco Barraza
- (El Salvador) Mario Montoya
- (Mexico) Alfredo del Águila
- (Mexico) Carlos Calderón de la Barca

2 goals

- (Cuba) Manuel Nazabel
- (Mexico) Antonio Jasso

1 goal

- (Colombia) Ricardo Díaz
- (Colombia) Silvio Dueñas
- (El Salvador) Fernando Barrios
- (El Salvador) Alfredo Ruano
- (El Salvador) Ricardo Valencia
- (Mexico) Teodoro de la Mora
- (Mexico) Rafael Gutiérrez
- (Mexico) Ivo Vázquez
- (Panama) José Félix de Bello
- (Panama) Luis Carlos Lemus
- (Panama) Apolonio Lombardo
- (Panama) Antonio Carlos Torres
- (Panama) Luis Carlos Valdés
