= Roy Padilla =

Roy Padilla may refer to:

- Roy Padilla Sr. (1926–1988), Filipino politician
- Roy Padilla (footballer) (born 1963), Honduran footballer
