= Lascelles Dunkley =

Jamaican footballer and manager (born 1941)

Personal information
- Date of birth: 28 June 1941 (age 85)
- Place of birth: Jamaica
- Position: Striker

Senior career*
Years	Team	Apps	(Gls)
1964–1965	YMCA		
1966	Sudbury Italia		
1967	Serbian White Eagles		
1973	Toronto West Indies United		

International career
1962–1969	Jamaica	13	(4)

Managerial career
- 1973: Toronto West Indies United
- * Club domestic league appearances and goals

Lascelles Dunkley (born June 28, 1941) is a Jamaican former footballer who played as a forward, and was a football manager.

== Club career ==
Dunkley played with YMCA of Kingston in 1964. The following season he played in a friendly match against Arsenal. In 1966, he played abroad in the National Soccer League with Sudbury Italia. He played with league rivals Serbian White Eagles for the 1967 season. He also had a trial with the Atlanta Chiefs in 1967. In 1973, he played with Toronto West Indies United, and assisted in securing the Ontario Cup against Windsor Italia. He was also named the Player of the Year by the Toronto and District Soccer Association in 1973.

== International career ==
Dunkley made his debut for the Jamaica national football team on March 30, 1963 against Netherlands Antilles national football team in the 1963 CONCACAF Championship. He represented Jamaica in the 1966 FIFA World Cup qualification (CONCACAF), and the 1970 FIFA World Cup qualification.

== Managerial career ==
In 1973, he served as the player-coach for the Toronto West Indies United in the Toronto and District Soccer League. He led Toronto to the Challenge Trophy finals in 1973 against Vancouver Firefighters, but lost the championship final. Toronto also competed for the 1973 Canadian Open Cup, and finished as runners-up to Toronto Croatia.
