= Football at the 1951 Pan American Games =

Football – Men's tournament at the 1951 Pan American Games
- Venue: Racing Club Stadium
- Dates: 27 February – 7 March

Medalists
Gold medal	Argentina
Silver medal	Costa Rica
Bronze medal	Chile

The first edition of the football tournament at the Pan American Games was held in Buenos Aires, Argentina, from 25 February to 8 March 1951. Five teams did compete, after Brazil withdrew on 16 February 1951.

Paraguay participated with the club side Club Sport Colombia, strengthened with some guest players from other clubs. Costa Rica and Venezuela entered their full national teams (as they only had amateur football domestically).

== Participants ==
Six teams entered the tournament, but Brazil withdrew before the draw.

Paraguay were represented by club side Sport Colombia, while Costa Rica and Venezuela entered their full national teams.

- Argentina
- ~~Brazil~~ (withdrew)
- Costa Rica
- Chile
- Paraguay (Sport Colombia)
- Venezuela

== Competition ==
=== Final table ===
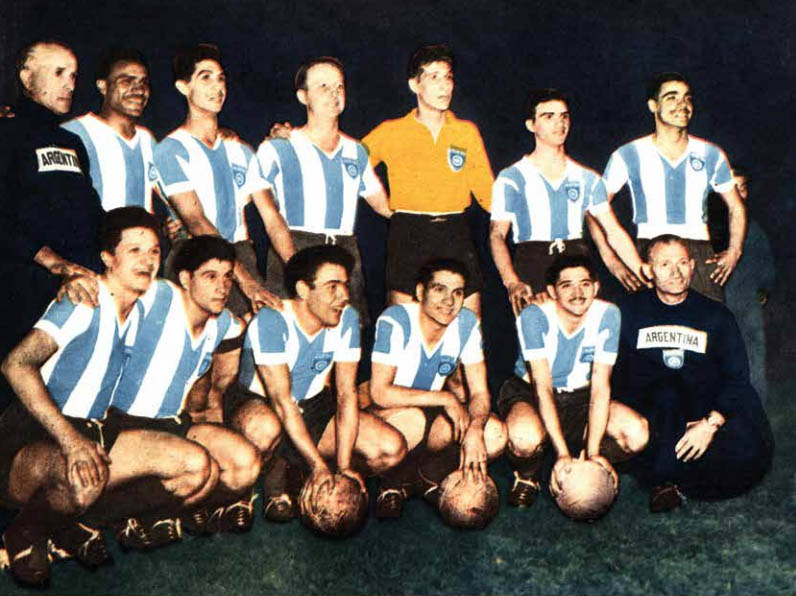
The Argentina squad, champions

Team	Pld	W	D	L	GF	GA	GD	Pts
Argentina	4	4	0	0	16	2	+14	8
Costa Rica	4	2	1	1	9	12	−3	5
Chile	4	1	2	1	8	6	+2	4
Venezuela	4	1	0	3	5	14	−9	2
Paraguay	4	0	1	3	5	9	−4	1

=== Match results ===
27 February

Argentina	5–0	Venezuela
Pellejero 13', 22'; Intini 48'; Baiocco	Report

Racing Club Stadium, Avellaneda
Referee: Alfredo Rossi (ARG)

27 February

Costa Rica	2–2	Chile
Zeledón 5'; Armijo 62'		Esquivel 15'; Apiolaza 75'

Racing Club Stadium, Avellaneda
Referee: Wally Muller (AUT)

1 March

Argentina	7–1	Costa Rica
Intini 10', 17'; Cupo 35', 39', 85'; Pellejero 41'; Baiocco 81'		Zeledón 27'

Racing Club Stadium, Avellaneda
Referee: Ernest Wilbraham (ENG)

1 March

Paraguay	2–3	Venezuela
Vaccaro 16'; Insfrán 81'		Díaz 50'; Monterola 69' (pen.); Olivares 74'

Racing Club Stadium, Avellaneda
Referee: Luis Ventre

3 March

Paraguay	0–1	Costa Rica
		Herrera

Racing Club Stadium, Avellaneda
Referee: José Yacovino (ARG)

3 March

Argentina	2–1	Chile
Martínez 64'; Cupo 67' (pen.)		Apiolaza

Racing Club Stadium, Avellaneda
Referee: Wally Muller

5 March

Venezuela	1–3	Costa Rica
Díaz 38'		Armijo 55'; Murillo 67'; Zeledón

Racing Club Stadium, Avellaneda
Referee: Alfredo Rossi (ARG)

5 March

Chile	1–1	Paraguay
Villablanca		Cabrera

Racing Club Stadium, Avellaneda
Referee: Ernest Wilbraham (ENG)

7 March

Chile	4–1	Venezuela
Saavedra 17', 23', 46'; Araya 66'		Rodríguez 79'

Racing Club Stadium, Avellaneda
Referee: Robert Aldrige (ENG)

7 March

Argentina	2–0	Paraguay
Cupo 43'; Martínez 67'

Racing Club Stadium, Avellaneda
Referee: Ernest Wilbraham (ENG)

Team details

Argentina
Paraguay

GK	Arturo Rodenak
DF	Juan Carlos Gini
DF	Enrique Olivero
MF	Manuel Miranda
MF	Roberto Comaschi
MF	Roberto Infantino
FW	José María Pellejero
FW	Norberto Cupo
FW	José Giarrizo
FW	Alfredo Martínez
FW	Juan Intini
Manager:
(Argentina) Guillermo Stábile

GK	Rubén Noceda
DF	Agustín Miranda
DF	Cándido Duarte
MF	Francisco León
MF	Alfonso Colman
MF	Eladio Cabrera
FW	Silvio Parodi
FW	R. Carballo
FW	Antonio Duarte
FW	Antonio Insfran
FW	J. Alcaraz
Manager:
(Paraguay) ?

1951 Pan American Games winners

Argentina
First title

== Medalists ==
Event	Gold	Silver	Bronze
Men's football	Argentina Ángel Ambrosini (DF); Miguel Ángel Baiocco (FW); Roberto Comaschi (MF); Ángel Cuccero (FW); Norberto Cupo (FW); Rogelio Domínguez (GK); José Giarrizo (FW); Carlos Glini (DF); Roberto Infantino (MF); Juan Intini (FW); Carmelo Longo (FW); Alfredo Martínez (FW); Juan Carlos Mendiburu (FW); Manuel Miranda (FW); Carlos Mousegne (DF); Enrique Olivero (DF); José Pellejero (DF); Arturo Rodenak (GK); René Segini (FW); Perfecto Seijo (DF); Alejandro Simion (DF); Osvaldo Vallone (MF) Guillermo Stábile (Head coach)	Costa Rica; Carlos Alvarado; Rodolfo Sanabria; Mario Cordero; Alex Sánchez; Nelson Morera; José Luis Quesada; Léon Alvarado; Elías Valenciano; Constantino Tulio Quiros; Héctor Julio González; Evelio Alpizar; Sigifrido Alvarado; Álvaro Murillo; Rodolfo Herrera; Miguel Ángel Zeledón; José Manuel Retana; Rafael Ángel García; Alberto Armijo; Walker Rodríguez; Rafael Campos; Jorge Quesada; Raúl Jiménez (M – Ricardo Saprissa / Luís Cartín)	Chile; Mario Pizarro; Alberto Cerda; Óscar Mogollones; Domingo Massaro; Salvador Arenas; Jorge García; David Buzada; Hugo Núñez; Alberto Rojas; Javier Briones; Roberto Apiolaza; Pedro Araya; Rubén Esquivel; Isaac Carrasco; Gerardo Valenzuela; Orlando Labbé; Arnoldo Weber; Ernesto Saavedra; Jorge Villablanca; Sergio González (M – Luis Tirado)

== Goalscorers ==
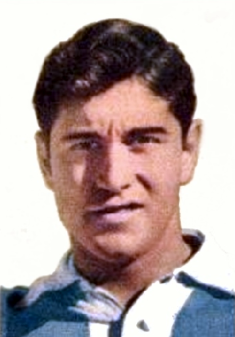
Norberto Cupo, top scorer with 5 goals

There were 40 goals scored in 10 matches, for an average of 4 goals per match.

5 goals

- (Argentina) Norberto Cupo

3 goals

- (Argentina) José Pellejero
- (Argentina) Juan Intini
- (Argentina) Miguel Angel Baiocco
- (Chile) Ernesto Saavedra
- (Costa Rica) Miguel Angel Zeledón

2 goals

- (Argentina) Alfredo Martínez
- (Costa Rica) Alberto Armijo
- (Chile) Roberto Apiolaza
- (Venezuela) César Díaz

1 goal

- (Chile) Pedro Arraya
- (Chile) Jorge Esquivel
- (Chile) Jorge Villablanca
- (Costa Rica) Rodolfo Herrera
- (Costa Rica) Álvaro Murillo
- (Paraguay) Eladio Cabrera
- (Paraguay) Antonio Insfrán
- (Paraguay) Adolfo Vaccaro
- (Venezuela) Gastón Monterola
- (Venezuela) Hely Olivares
- (Venezuela) Enrique Rodríguez

Source: RSSSF

== Team of the Tournament ==
Ideal XI by La Nación
Goalkeeper	Defenders	Midfielders	Forwards
(Chile) Rubén Pizarro	(Venezuela) Rafael Márquez (Chile) Salvador Arenas	(Chile) David Buzada (Argentina) Manuel Miranda (Argentina) Roberto Infantino	(Argentina) Miguel Baiocco (Argentina) Norberto Cupo (Argentina) Alfredo Martínez (Costa Rica) Miguel Zeledón (Argentina) Juan Intini

== Bibliography ==
- Olderr, Steven (2009). The Pan American Games: A Statistical History, 1951-1999, bilingual edition. McFarland & Company. ISBN 0786443367. ISBN 9780786443369.
