= Ramiro Navarro =

Mexican footballer (born 1943)

Personal information
- Full name: Ramiro Navarro de Anda
- Date of birth: 25 May 1943
- Place of birth: Tepatitlán de Morelos, Jalisco, Mexico
- Date of death: 26 March 2008 (aged 64)
- Position: Forward

Youth career
- CD Tenería

Senior career*
Years	Team	Apps	(Gls)
1961–1966	Oro		
1966–1968	América		
1968–1970	Necaxa		

International career
1965–1966	Mexico	7	(1)
- * Club domestic league appearances and goals

Ramiro Navarro de Anda (25 May 1943 – 26 March 2008) was a Mexican former football forward who played for Mexico at the 1965 CONCACAF Championship and the 1966 FIFA World Cup. He won the Primera División title with Oro in 1962–63 and subsequently played for América and Necaxa.

== Career ==
Born in Tepatitlán, Jalisco, Navarro began playing football with Club Deportivo Tenería. He went on to play professionally with CD Oro. Navarro appeared for Oro in the 1963 International Soccer League, where he scored the game-winning goal in a 2–1 win over French side Valenciennes at Downing Stadium. After his time with CD Oro, he moved to the capital, where he signed with Club América (becoming vice-champion of Mexico in the 1966/1967 season) and then with Club Necaxa. He was suspended for one year after assaulting a referee in 1967.

Navarro represented the Mexico national team at the 1966 FIFA World Cup. He also scored the second goal in a 2–0 win over the United States during 1966 FIFA World Cup qualifiers.

== Personal life ==
After his football career, he dedicated himself to teaching and research. In 1974 he became a Fulbright Scholar and went to study at the University of Texas at Austin, the University of Río Piedras, and the National Autonomous University of Mexico, where he notably focused on Mexican bibliography and history. He also worked as a lawyer and history teacher from the University of Guadalajara. His nephew, Pablo Lemus Navarro, has served as the mayor of both Zapopan and Guadalajara.

== Honours ==
Oro

- Primera División: 1962–63
- Campeón de Campeones: 1963
