= Errol Daniels =

Costa Rican footballer (born 1944)

Personal information
- Full name: Errol Daniels Hibbert
- Date of birth: 17 May 1944 (age 82)
- Place of birth: Guácimo, Costa Rica
- Height: 1.79 m (5 ft 10 1/2 in)
- Position: Forward

Youth career
- Alajuelense

Senior career*
Years	Team	Apps	(Gls)
1964–1972	Alajuelense	242	(196)
1972–1973	Puntarenas		

International career
1965–1970	Costa Rica	18	(7)
- * Club domestic league appearances and goals

Errol Daniels Hibbert (born May 17, 1944) is a Costa Rican former football player, who used to play as a striker for Alajuelense. He played for the same club his entire career except for a final season at Puntarenas. He currently resides in New York.

== Club career ==
Daniels made his debut in the Costa Rican Primera División as only 21 year-old on June 14, 1964, against Cartaginés, scoring 2 goals. He started playing as a left forward because the center forward position was being filled by another historic player, Juan Ulloa.

His strengths were his explosive speed and his ferocious shot. He was always distinguished for being an ally with the goal and was top scorer of his local league in 6 seasons (1964, 1965, 1966, 1967, 1968 and 1970). Daniels is the all-time top scorer of the league with 196 goals. He scored 234 goals in all games. Daniels shares the record for most goals scored in the Costa Rican Primera, notching 41 goals for LD Alajuelense during the 1967 season. He scored 24 goals in 1964, 32 in 1965, 30 in 1966, 41 in 1967, 23 in 1968, 16 in 1969, 25 in 1970 and one goal in 1971 and 1972. He also won the national tournament with his team in 1966, 1970 and 1971.

His career suddenly faded due to an injury on April 14, 1971. The season was just starting and in the second game he crashed against the goalkeeper from Barrio México, Freddy Jiménez Luna, fracturing his right leg. He returned on June 25, 1972, against AD San Carlos, and scored his last goal on September 17 of the same year against Municipal Puntarenas.

=== Goal record controversy ===
Daniels officially scored 196 league goals as recorded by UNAFUT. However it has been reported he scored another 4 goals in 1963, claiming his total to be 200 goals. He was surpassed by Víctor Núñez as Costa Rican premier division all-time top goalscorer in November 2013.

Daniels also holds the record of scoring 15 goals in 11 consecutive games.

== International career ==
Daniels was also part of the Ticos from 1965 to 1970, playing 18 games and scoring 7 goals. He represented his country in 3 FIFA World Cup qualification matches.

== Retirement ==
After leaving Puntarenas he trained with New York Cosmos but later worked at a fur coat factory and a women's fashion house in New York.
