= Walt Schmotolocha =

American soccer player

Walter “Walt” Schmotolocha (Ukrainian: Вальтер Шмотолоха) is a former U.S. soccer forward who earned two caps with the U.S. national team.

== International career ==
On March 7, 1965, he scored a goal in the 61st minute of a 2–2 tie with Mexico in 1966 FIFA World Cup qualifier. Despite the tie, the U.S. failed to qualify for the finals and Schmotolocha after a game two weeks later against Honduras he was not called into any other U.S. games.

== Club career ==
In 1960, Schmotolocha joined the New York Ukrainian Sports Club (USC New York) for the team's inaugural season in the German American Soccer League (GASL). In 1965, the Ukrainians won the National Challenge Cup. Shmotolocha scored a goal in the Ukrainians 3–0 victory over Chicago Hansa after the teams had ended the first game tied 1-1.

== Collegiate soccer ==
Schmotolocha attended Pratt Institute in New York City where he played on the men's soccer team. In 1962, Pratt lost to East Stroudsbourg in the NAIA championship game. Schmotoloca was named the Tournament MVP. In 1963, he was named a first team Small College All American.
