= Mario Flores (Salvadoran footballer) =

Salvadoran footballer (born 1943)

Personal information
- Date of birth: 12 September 1943 (age 83)
- Place of birth: Santa Ana, El Salvador
- Position: Midfielder

International career
Years	Team	Apps	(Gls)
- El Salvador

Mario Flores (born 12 September 1943) is a Salvadoran former footballer. He competed in the men's tournament at the 1968 Summer Olympics.
