= Ricardo Valencia =

Salvadoran footballer (1927-2010)

Personal information
- Full name: Ricardo Ovidio Valencia
- Date of birth: 1927
- Place of birth: Santa Ana, El Salvador
- Date of death: April 20, 2010 (aged 83)
- Position: Striker

Senior career*
Years	Team	Apps	(Gls)
1949–1960	FAS		(62)
1955,1957	Once Municipal		
1959	Atletico Constancia		

International career
1953–1955	El Salvador	26	(5)
Medal record
Representing El Salvador
Men's Football
Central American and Caribbean Games
Gold medal – first place	1954 El Salvador	Team competition
- * Club domestic league appearances and goals

Ricardo Ovidio Valencia (1927 – April 20, 2010, in Santa Ana, El Salvador) was a Salvadoran footballer who played most of his career in C.D. FAS.

== Playing career ==
=== Club career ===
Nicknamed el Chilenito (the little Chilean), Santa Ana-born and raised Ricardo Valencia joined the newly formed team FAS in 1949. He spent 10 years with the club scoring 62 goals and winning 3 titles including one where the entire FAS team was made up of players from Santa Ana. He also played for Once Municipal during 1955 and 1957.

In 1959, he was sold to Atletico Constancia for one colon he played there for one year and then returned to FAS before retiring from football.

=== International career ===
Valencia has made 26 appearances for the El Salvador national football team, scoring five goals. In 1954 he won the gold medal with the Salvadoran team in the Juegos Deportivos Centroamericanos, winning the group which contained Mexico, Colombia, Cuba and Panama.

== Retirement and death ==
After retiring from football, Valencia worked for the Comisión Ejecutiva Hidroeléctrica del Río Lempa (CEL) for more than 30 years. He still remained active with the El Salvador national team and C.D. FAS.

On April 20, 2010, Ricardo Valencia died after suffering respiratory insufficiency, brought on by a pulmonary fibrosis. He is buried at the Cementerio Santa Isabel, de Santa Ana next to his wife Rosa Isabel de Valencia.

== Honours ==
=== Domestic ===
- Primera División: 3

1951-52, 1953–54, 1957–58

=== International ===
- Central American and Caribbean Games: 1

1954
