= Apolonio Lombardo =

Panamanian footballer (1934–2020)

Personal information
- Full name: Apolonio Lombardo Rangel
- Date of birth: 26 January 1934
- Date of death: 16 September 2020 (aged 86)
- Position: Midfielder

Youth career
- Oratorio Festivo

Senior career*
Years	Team	Apps	(Gls)
- Santander
- Unión Ibérico
- Unión Española
- La Garantía

International career
1953–1961	Panama	17	(4)
- * Club domestic league appearances and goals

Apolonio Lombardo Rangel (26 January 1934 – 16 September 2020) was a Panamanian footballer who played as a midfielder.

== Career ==
Lombardo played club football for Oratorio Festivo, Santander, Unión Ibérico, Unión Española and La Garantía.

Lombardo played for the Panama national team between 1953 and 1961, making his debut at the age of 19. He scored 4 goals in 17 games.
