= 1971 CONCACAF Championship qualification =

Tournament details
- Dates: 5 September – 13 October 1971
- Teams: 12 (from 1 confederation)

Tournament statistics
- Matches played: 10
- Goals scored: 26 (2.6 per match)

The 1971 CONCACAF Championship qualification competition was the qualifying contest to decide the finalists for the 1971 CONCACAF Championship – the fifth international association football championship for members of the Confederation of North, Central America and Caribbean Association Football (CONCACAF). Qualifying ran from 5 September – 13 October 1971 and was contested by the national teams of 12 CONCACAF member associations.

Trinidad and Tobago, the hosts of the championship, and Costa Rica, the defending champions, qualified automatically and did not take part in the qualification competition. The qualifying competition was split into three zones – a Caribbean zone, a Central American zone and a North American zone. Two teams from the Caribbean zone (Cuba and Haiti) and one each from the Central American zone (Honduras) and the North American zone (Mexico) qualified for the final tournament.

== Background ==
The Confederation of North, Central America and Caribbean Association Football (CONCACAF) was founded as a merger of the Confederación Centroamericana y del Caribe de Fútbol (CCCF) and North American Football Confederation (NAFC) in 1961. The first CONCACAF Championship, in which all the competing nations qualified automatically, was held in 1963. A qualifying competition was introduced from the second edition in 1965.

== Format ==
Qualification for the 1971 CONCACAF Championship was split into a Caribbean zone, a Central American zone and a North American zone.

In the first round of the Caribbean zone, the six teams were drawn into three two-legged ties. The team scoring more goals on aggregate in each tie would advance to the second round. The remaining teams would then contest a round-robin where each team would play all of the others. The winner and runner-up would qualify for the final tournament.

In the first round of the Central American zone, the four teams were drawn into two two-legged ties. The team scoring more goals on aggregate in each tie would advance to the second round. The remaining teams would then contest a two-legged tie. The team scoring more goals on aggregate would qualify for the final tournament.

In the North American zone, the two teams contested a two-legged tie. The team scoring more goals on aggregate would qualify for the final tournament.

=== Participants ===
Caribbean zone:

- Cuba
- Guyana
- Haiti
- Jamaica
- Netherlands Antilles
- Suriname

Central American zone:

- El Salvador
- Guatemala
- Honduras
- Nicaragua

North American zone:

- Bermuda
- Mexico

== Caribbean zone ==
=== First round ===
The Netherlands Antilles withdrew from the competition and Haiti were given a walkover to the second round.

In the first leg on 15 September, Suriname defeated Guyana 4–1. Six days later, in the second leg, Suriname won 3–2 against Guyana to advance 7–3 on aggregate. On 1 October, Cuba defeated Jamaica 1–0 in the first leg. Two days later, in the second leg, Cuba drew 0–0 with Jamaica and advanced to the second round 1–0 on aggregate.

Caribbean zone first round
Team 1	Agg.	Team 2	1st leg	2nd leg
Suriname	7–3	Guyana	4–1	3–2
Jamaica	0–1	Cuba	0–1	0–0
Haiti	w/o (Note: Netherlands Antilles withdrew.)	Netherlands Antilles	—	—

==== Results ====
15 September 1971

Suriname	4–1	Guyana
Unknown (4)		Unknown

21 September 1971

Guyana	2–3	Suriname
Unknown (2)		Unknown (3)

Suriname won 7–3 on aggregate.

1 October 1971

Jamaica	0–1	Cuba
		Massó 51'

3 October 1971

Cuba	0–0	Jamaica

Cuba won 1–0 on aggregate.

Haiti	Cancelled	Netherlands Antilles

Netherlands Antilles	Cancelled	Haiti

=== Second round ===
The second round did not take place after Cuba and Suriname refused to meet Haiti in the final triangular. As a result, CONCACAF decided to award the places in the final tournament to Haiti and Cuba.

== Central American zone ==
The first round first legs began on 5 September when Honduras defeated Guatemala 1–0. Four days later, El Salvador defeated Nicaragua 3–2 in their first leg match. In the second leg on 12 September, Honduras drew 1–1 with Guatemala to advance 2–1 on aggregate. Three days later, El Salvador defeated Nicaragua 1–0 to advance 4–2 on aggregate.

Prior to the second round, El Salvador withdrew as a result of the Football War and Honduras were given a walkover to the final tournament.

Central American zone
Team 1	Agg.	Team 2	1st leg	2nd leg
First round
Honduras	1–1	Guatemala	1–0	1–1
Nicaragua	2–4	El Salvador	2–3	0–1
Second round
El Salvador	w/o (Note: El Salvador withdrew as a result of the Football War.)	Honduras	—	—

=== First round ===
5 September 1971

Honduras	1–0	Guatemala
Unknown

Estadio Nacional Chelato Uclés, Tegucigalpa
12 September 1971

Guatemala	1–1	Honduras
Unknown		Unknown

Estadio Doroteo Guamuch Flores, Guatemala City

Honduras won 2–1 on aggregate.

9 September 1971

Nicaragua	2–3	El Salvador
Unknown (2)		Unknown (3)

Managua
15 September 1971

El Salvador	1–0	Nicaragua
Unknown

Estadio Jorge "Mágico" González, San Salvador

El Salvador won 4–2 on aggregate.

=== Second round ===
El Salvador	Cancelled	Honduras

Honduras	Cancelled	El Salvador

== North American zone ==
The first leg was held on 3 October when Mexico defeated Bermuda 2–0. Ten days later, Mexico won the second leg 4–0 against Bermuda to qualify for the final tournament 6–0 on aggregate.

North American zone
Team 1	Agg.	Team 2	1st leg	2nd leg
Bermuda	0–6	Mexico	0–2	0–4

=== Results ===
3 October 1971

Bermuda	0–2	Mexico
		Borja 44'; Jiménez 49'

Bermuda National Stadium, Hamilton
Referee: John de Salvatore (United States)
13 October 1971

Mexico	4–0	Bermuda
Borja 7'; Velarde 40', 60'; López 75'

Estadio Azteca, Mexico City
Referee: Mario Canesa (Guatemala)

Mexico won 6–0 on aggregate.
