= Mario Montoya (footballer) =

Salvadoran footballer

Personal information
- Full name: Mario Arnoldo Montoya
- Place of birth: El Salvador
- Position: Striker

Senior career*
Years	Team	Apps	(Gls)
- Atlético España
1953–1954	Juventud Olímpica		

International career
1953–1954	El Salvador	17	(5)
Medal record
Representing El Salvador
Men's Football
Central American and Caribbean Games
Gold medal – first place	1954 El Salvador	Team competition
- * Club domestic league appearances and goals

Mario Arnoldo Montoya (born in El Salvador) was a Salvadoran footballer.

== Club career ==
A free-kick specialist, Montoya played for Atlético España, Juventud Olímpica and others between 1947 and 1957.

== International career ==
Nicknamed Marilet, Montoya was part of the national team that won the 1954 Central American and Caribbean Games. Alongside the famous Juan Francisco Barraza, he scored three goals during the tournament. He also scored twice against Panama a year earlier at the CCCF Championship.

== Retirement ==
After retiring he became a salesman of birdcages.
