= Ernesto Cisneros =

Mexican football midfielder (born 1940)

Personal information
- Full name: Ernesto Cisneros Salcedo
- Date of birth: 26 October 1940 (age 86)
- Place of birth: Guadalajara, Jalisco, Mexico
- Height: 1.80 m (5 ft 11 in)
- Position: Forward

Senior career*
Years	Team	Apps	(Gls)
1958–1962	Club Atlas		
1962–1967	Zacatepec		
1967–1972	Atlante		

International career
1965–1970	Mexico	38	(13)
- * Club domestic league appearances and goals

Ernesto Cisneros Salcedo (born 26 October 1940) is a Mexican former football midfielder who played for Mexico in the 1966 FIFA World Cup. He also played for Club Atlas and he competed in the men's tournament at the 1964 Summer Olympics.

== Club career ==
Cisneros played in the first Mexican league match at Estadio Jalisco.

== International career ==
He made his debut for Mexico in 1965 and earned a total of 38 caps, scoring 13 goals.
