= Asher Welch =

Jamaican footballer (born 1944)

Personal information
- Date of birth: 16 April 1944 (age 82)
- Place of birth: Kingston, Jamaica
- Position: Striker

Senior career*
Years	Team	Apps	(Gls)
–	Cavaliers FC	?	(?)
1967–1969	Baltimore Bays	34	(5)
1970	Kansas City Spurs	23	(3)
Total		57	(8)
- * Club domestic league appearances and goals

Asher Welch (born 16 April 1944) is a Jamaican former professional soccer player who played in the NASL between 1967 and 1970 for the Baltimore Bays and Kansas City Spurs. He began his career in Jamaica with Cavaliers FC, alongside twin brother Art.
