= Roy Padilla (footballer) =

Honduran footballer (born 1963)

Personal information
- Full name: Roy Arturo Padilla Bardales
- Date of birth: February 7, 1963 (age 63)
- Place of birth: La Lima, Honduras
- Height: 1.68 m (5 ft 6 in)
- Position: Attacking midfielder

Senior career*
| Years | Team | Apps | (Gls) |
| 1982–1983 | Marathón | 3 | (0) |
| 1983–1985 | Motagua | 24 | (1) |
| 1985–1991 | Marathón | 90 | (16) |
| 1991–1992 | Vida | 12 | (0) |
| 1992–1993 | Marathón | 0 | (0) |
| 1993–1994 | Deportes Progreseño | 14 | (0) |
| Total | | 143 | (17) |

International career^{‡}
| 1982–1983 | Honduras U-20 | 2 | (0) |
| 1983 | Honduras Olympic | 0 | (0) |
- * Club domestic league appearances and goals as of 2016 ‡ National team caps and goals as of 2016

Roy Arturo Padilla Bardales (born February 7, 1963) is a retired Honduran football midfielder.

== Club career ==
Padilla began his first steps at Atlético Alús in the lower leagues from San Pedro Sula. In 1982, he was signed by Marathón, making his first spell at the team. A year later, F.C. Motagua acquired his services. In 1985, he returned to Marathón, in which a headed goal gave his team the second championship in his history.

Padilla retired at Deportes Progreseño in 1994. He is now an electric technician.

== International career ==
Padilla played in the youth national football teams of Honduras, more precisely the U-20 and U-23 categories. He never reached to play in the top category.
