= Víctor Azúcar =

Salvadoran footballer (1946–1979)

Personal information
- Full name: Víctor Manuel Azúcar Urrutia
- Date of birth: 20 September 1946
- Place of birth: San Salvador, El Salvador
- Date of death: 20 January 1979 (aged 32)
- Position: Forward

International career
Years	Team	Apps	(Gls)
- El Salvador

Víctor Manuel Azúcar Urrutia (20 September 1946 – 20 January 1979) was a Salvadoran footballer. He competed in the men's tournament at the 1968 Summer Olympics.
