= Antonio Jasso =

Mexican footballer (1935-2013)

Personal information
- Full name: Antonio Jasso Almaraz
- Date of birth: 11 March 1935
- Place of birth: Mexico City, Mexico
- Date of death: 26 June 2013 (aged 78)
- Position: Forward

Senior career*
Years	Team	Apps	(Gls)
1954–1956	Necaxa		
1956–1960	Zacatepec		
1960–1966	América		

International career
1956–1962	Mexico	18	(2)
- * Club domestic league appearances and goals

Juan Antonio Jasso Almaraz (11 March 1935 – 26 June 2013) was a Mexican professional football forward who played for Mexico in the 1962 FIFA World Cup. He also played for Club América.
