= Mario Monge =

Salvadoran footballer (born 1938)

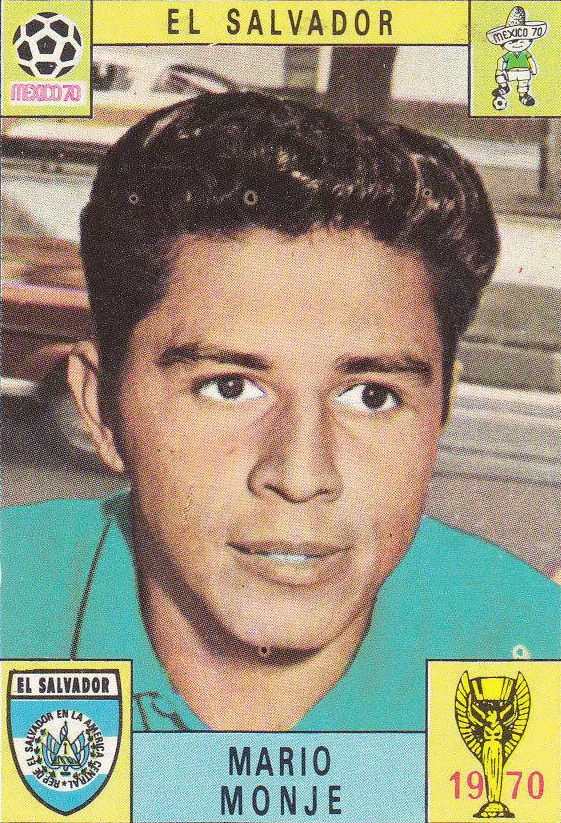
- Monge in 1970

Personal information
- Full name: Mario Antonio Monge Paredes
- Date of birth: 27 November 1938 (age 87)
- Place of birth: San Salvador, El Salvador
- Position: Striker

Senior career*
Years	Team	Apps	(Gls)
1956	El Salvador youth		
1957–1958	Once Municipal		
1959	Atletico Constancia		
1961–1962	FAS		
1963	FAS		
1962	Toronto Italia		
1965–1967	Alianza		
1968–1970	FAS		

International career^{‡}
1961–1970	El Salvador	30	(8)
- * Club domestic league appearances and goals as of 8 September 2008 ‡ National team caps and goals as of July 22, 2011

Mario Antonio Monge Paredes (born 27 November 1938) is a footballer from El Salvador who played as a forward.

== Club career ==
Monge played for two of the "Big Four" of Salvadoran football, FAS and Alianza.

== International career ==
Monge has represented his country in six FIFA World Cup qualification matches and played two matches at the 1970 FIFA World Cup Finals.

== Honours ==
- Primera División de Fútbol de El Salvador: 2

1966, 1967

- CONCACAF Champions Cup: 1

1967
