= Elmer Acevedo =

Salvadoran footballer (1949–2017)

Élmer Acevedo
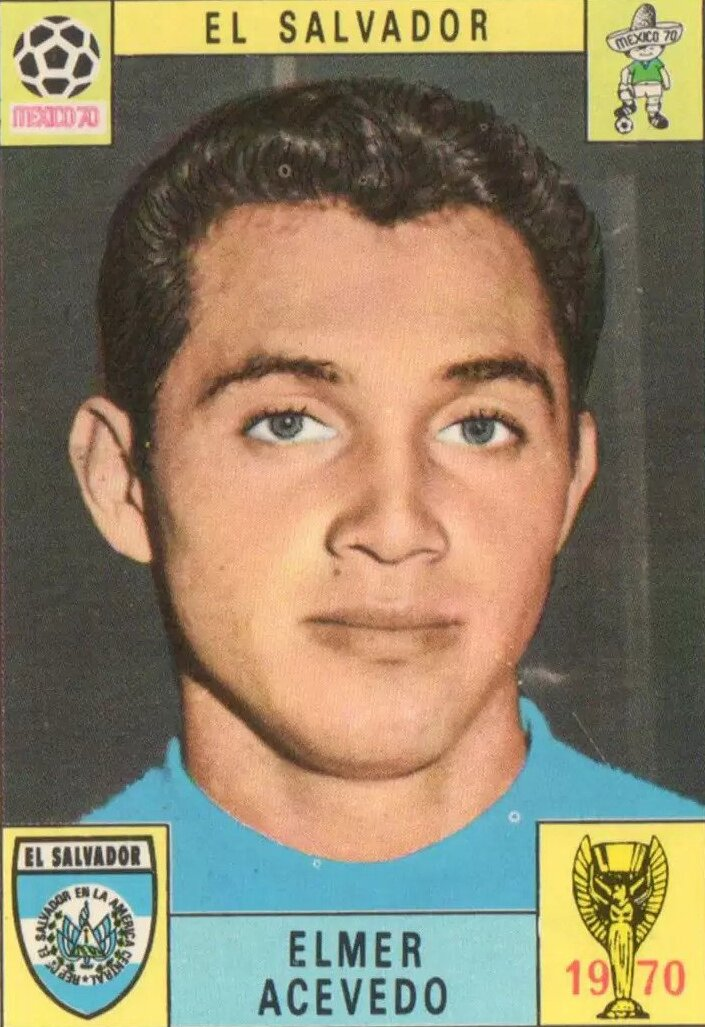
- Acevedo in 1970

Personal information
- Full name: Élmer Ángel Acevedo Aguilar
- Date of birth: 24 February 1946
- Place of birth: Chanmico, La Libertad, El Salvador
- Date of death: 30 August 2017 (aged 71)
- Place of death: Acajutla, Sonsonate, El Salvador
- Position: Striker

Senior career*
Years	Team	Apps	(Gls)
1965–1971	FAS		(47)

International career
	El Salvador	12	(4)

Managerial career
- 1973: Los Andes
- * Club domestic league appearances and goals

Élmer Ángel Acevedo Aguilar (24 February 1946 – 30 August 2017) was a footballer from El Salvador who played as a striker for the national football team.

== Club career ==
Born in La Libertad Department, he moved to study in Santa Ana and joined the youth team of local club FAS, aged 16. After six years in the first team, Acevedo retired in 1972 due to a serious injury to his left leg.

== International career ==
Acevedo represented El Salvador at the 1968 Olympic Games and in 1970 FIFA World Cup qualification, where he scored in the match against Honduras which sparked the infamous Football War. He also was a non-playing member of his nation's 1970 World Cup Finals squad in Mexico.

== Death ==
Acevedo died on 30 August 2017, in Acajutla, Sonsonate, El Salvador.
