= Alfredo Ruano =

Salvadoran footballer (1932–1987)

Personal information
- Full name: Alfredo Salomón Ruano Safie
- Date of birth: 14 October 1932
- Place of birth: San Salvador, El Salvador
- Date of death: 18 July 1987 (aged 54)
- Place of death: San Salvador, El Salvador
- Height: 1.73 m (5 ft 8 in)
- Position: Striker

Senior career*
Years	Team	Apps	(Gls)
–1958	Atlético Marte		
?	Atlante San Alejo		
1958–1966	Alianza		

International career
1954–1965	El Salvador	42	(10)

Managerial career
- Sonsonate
- Águila
- UCA
- 1968: El Salvador (assistant coach)
- 1970-1971: C.D. ADLER
Medal record
Representing El Salvador
Men's Football
Central American and Caribbean Games
Gold medal – first place	1954 El Salvador	Team competition
- * Club domestic league appearances and goals as of 8 September 2008

Alfredo Salomón Ruano Safie (14 October 1932 – 18 July 1987) was a football player from El Salvador who played as a forward.

== Club career ==
Ruano was part of the successful Alianza team of the early 1960s when he played alongside Salvador Mariona and Roberto Rivas among others.

== International career ==
Nicknamed Baiza, Alfredo Ruano participated in many tournaments throughout his career with El Salvador, such as the CCCF Championship, CONCACAF Championship, and Central American and Caribbean Games. He played in the 1954 Central American and Caribbean Games winning team alongside other Salvadoran football greats as Juan Francisco Barraza.

== Personal life ==
Alfredo was married to Nora Elizabeth Guerra de Ruano and they had 4 children named Mario Alfredo Ruano Guerra, Ana Maria Ruano Guerra, Juan Carlos Alberto Ruano Guerra, and Nora Elizabeth Ruano Guerra. He was the founder and business owner of Baiza Ruano Deportes in San Salvador, El Salvador. Baiza was also the father-in-law of another Salvadoran legend: Mágico González. His grandson Rodrigo González, who is the son of Mágico, later also played for Atlético Marte.

== Death ==
In 1987, Ruano collapsed while playing park football at Colonia Amatepec, and he later died. It was suggested it was either a heart attack or heart congestion.
