= Leonel Hernández =

Costa Rican footballer (born 1943)

Personal information
- Full name: Leonel Hernández Valerín
- Date of birth: 3 October 1943 (age 83)
- Place of birth: Cartago, Costa Rica
- Position: Striker

Youth career
- 1957–1962: Cartaginés

Senior career*
Years	Team	Apps	(Gls)
1962–1977	Cartaginés	360	(164)

International career
1963–1972	Costa Rica	35	(11)
- * Club domestic league appearances and goals

Leonel Hernández Valerín (born 3 October 1943 in Cartago) is a retired Costa Rican football player.

== Club career ==
Hernández spent his entire career with hometown club Cartaginés, after joining their youth team in 1957. He made his debut for the senior team in 1962. He was part of the club's famous Ballet Azul squad in the 1970s and became the Costa Rican Primera División top goalscorer in 1973.

In February 2013, Danny Fonseca equalled Hernández' club record of 360 games.

== International career ==
Hernández was capped by Costa Rica, playing 35 games and scoring 11 goals. He represented his country in 10 FIFA World Cup qualification matches.

== Personal life ==
Hernández was born to José Francisco Hernández Madriz and Dolores Valerín Brenes. He is married to María de los Angeles Artavia Luna and they have two daughters. He worked at the audit department at the Banco Crédito Agrícola de Cartago.
