= Alberto Armijo =

Costa Rican footballer (1926-2021)

Personal information
- Full name: Alberto Armijo Pujol
- Date of birth: 27 September 1926
- Place of birth: Nicoya, Costa Rica
- Date of death: 9 August 2021 (aged 94)
- Place of death: San Jose, Costa Rica
- Position: Striker

Youth career
- 1937–1939: Saprissa

Senior career*
Years	Team	Apps	(Gls)
1944	Orión		
1945–1951	UCR		
- Gimnástica Española
- La Libertad
–1962	Cartaginés		

International career^{‡}
1948–1960	Costa Rica	16	(6)
Medal record
Men's football
Representing Costa Rica
Pan American Games
Silver medal – second place	1951 Buenos Aires	Team
- * Club domestic league appearances and goals ‡ National team caps and goals as of 28 April 2015

Alberto Armijo Pujol (Note: In this Spanish name, the first or paternal surname is Armijo and the second or maternal family name is Pujol.) (27 September 1926 – 9 August 2021) was a Costa Rican football striker.

== Club career ==
Nicknamed El Gallego, Armijo was born in Nicoya, Guanacaste Province, but moved to San José when he was young and played in the junior leagues with Saprissa. He made his senior debut for Orión and was the league's top goalscorer twice, in 1950 with 25 goals for Universidad and in 1961 with 16 goals for Cartaginés.

== International career ==
He also played for Costa Rica at three CCCF Championships, the 1950 Central American and Caribbean Games and the 1951 Pan American Games. He earned a total of 16 caps, scoring 6 goals.

== Basketball ==
Armijo also was a basketball player, playing for Seminario E. L. and Orión.

== Personal life ==
Armijo was married and had 4 children. After his football career he worked at the Banco Nacional and Banco Central de Costa Rica.

He died on 9 August 2021, aged 94.
