= Juan Ramón Martínez (footballer) =

Salvadoran footballer (1948–2024)

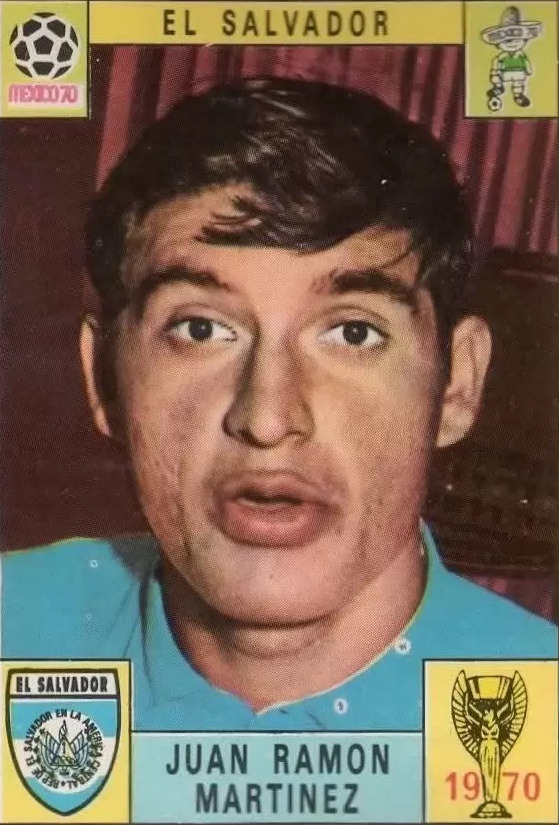
- Martínez in 1970

Personal information
- Full name: Juan Ramón Martínez
- Date of birth: 20 April 1948
- Place of birth: San Miguel, El Salvador
- Date of death: 4 August 2024 (aged 76)
- Position: Midfielder

Youth career
- 1964–1966: C.D. Aguila

Senior career*
Years	Team	Apps	(Gls)
1965–1966	Municipal		
1967–1970	Águila		
1971–1973	Juventud Olímpica		
1974–1975	Alianza		
1976–1979	Once Municipal		
- Once Lobos

International career
1967–1976	El Salvador	32	(14)
- * Club domestic league appearances and goals

Juan Ramón "Mon" Martínez (20 April 1948 – 4 August 2024) was a Salvadoran footballer who played as a midfielder.

== Club career ==
Martínez played in Guatemala, where he won a title with Municipal in 1965–66.

== International career ==
Martínez represented his country at the 1968 Summer Olympics, Salvador’s only participation to the Olympic Football Tournament, playing three games and scoring Salvador’s first ever goal (out of 2) in the Olympics and the 1970 FIFA World Cup in Mexico.

He scored 14 goals for the El Salvador national team from 1967 to 1976, 7 of those in World Cup qualification.

== Death ==
Martínez died on 4 August 2024, at the age of 76.
