= Juan Ulloa =

Costa Rican footballer (1935-2017)

Personal information
- Full name: Juan Ulloa Ramírez
- Date of birth: February 5, 1935
- Place of birth: Alajuela, Costa Rica
- Date of death: February 11, 2017 (aged 82)
- Place of death: Alajuela, Costa Rica
- Position: Striker

Youth career
- 1948: El Carmen de Alajuela

Senior career*
Years	Team	Apps	(Gls)
1953–1963	Alajuelense		(86)
1962	Real Betis		(8)
1964–1965	Aurora		
1965–1966	León		
1966–1967	San Carlos		
- UD Canarias
- Puntarenas
- Uruguay de Coronado
- Orión

International career
1955–1961	Costa Rica	27	(27)
- * Club domestic league appearances and goals

Juan Ulloa Ramírez (February 5, 1935 – February 11, 2017) was a Costa Rican football player, who used to play as a striker.

== Club career ==
Ulloa started his career in 1948 at Third Division side El Carmen de Alajuela and played the majority of his career for hometown club Alajuelense, but also had spells at Puntarenas, San Carlos, Uruguay de Coronado and Orión as well as abroad at Guatemalan side Aurora, in Mexico with León, four months with Real Betis in Spain and Unión Deportiva Canarias in Venezuela.

Ulloa was top scorer of the Primera División three times, in 1959, 1960 and 1966, totalling 140 goals in the Costa Rica Primera División. He scored a record total of 247 goals in all competitions (league, cup, national team and internal club matches).

He retired in 1970.

== International career ==
Ulloa was also part of the Ticos, playing 27 games and scoring 27 goals. He was the national team's all-time goalscorer until Rolando Fonseca surpassed him in 2001. He represented his country in 7 FIFA World Cup qualification matches.

== Death ==
On February 11, 2017, Ulloa was invited to receive a tribute in the Estadio Alejandro Morera Soto before a match between Alajuelense and San Carlos, as he had played for both teams in his career. Former Alajuelense player Pablo Nassar took him back to his house, where Ulloa suffered a cardiorespiratory problem. He was taken to the San Rafael Hospital in Alajuela, where he died.
