= Costa Rica national football team =

Men's association football team

Costa Rica
- Nickname(s): Los Ticos; La Sele; La Tricolor
- Association: Federación Costarricense de Fútbol (FCRF)
- Confederation: CONCACAF (North America)
- Sub-confederation: UNCAF (Central America)
- Head coach: Bryan Ruiz
- Captain: Keylor Navas
- Most caps: Celso Borges (166)
- Top scorer: Rolando Fonseca (47)
- Home stadium: Estadio Nacional
- FIFA code: CRC
First colours	Second colours

FIFA ranking
- Current: 55 ▼1 (18 November 2026)
- Highest: 13 (February–March 2015)
- Lowest: 93 (July 1996)

First international
- Costa Rica 7–0 El Salvador (Guatemala City, Guatemala; 14 September 1921)

Biggest win
- Costa Rica 12–0 Puerto Rico (Barranquilla, Colombia; 10 December 1946)

Biggest defeat
- Mexico 7–0 Costa Rica (Mexico City, Mexico; 17 August 1975); Spain 7–0 Costa Rica (Doha, Qatar; 23 November 2022); Argentina 7–0 Costa Rica (Córdoba, Argentina; 17 November 2026)

World Cup
- Appearances: 6 (first in 1990)
- Best result: Quarter-finals (2014)

CONCACAF Championship / Gold Cup
- Appearances: 23 (first in 1963)
- Best result: Champions (1963, 1969, 1989)

CONCACAF Nations League Finals
- Appearances: 1 (first in 2021)
- Best result: Fourth place (2021)

Copa América
- Appearances: 6 (first in 1997)
- Best result: Quarter-finals (2001, 2004)

Olympic Games
- Appearances: 2 (first in 1980)
- Best result: Group stage (1980, 1984)
Medal record
CONCACAF Championship / Gold Cup
Gold medal – first place	1963 El Salvador	Team
Gold medal – first place	1969 Costa Rica	Team
Gold medal – first place	1989 North America	Team
Silver medal – second place	2002 United States	Team
Bronze medal – third place	1965 Guatemala	Team
Bronze medal – third place	1971 Trinidad and Tobago	Team
Bronze medal – third place	1985 North America	Team
Bronze medal – third place	1993 United States and Mexico	Team
CCCF Championship
Gold medal – first place	1941 Costa Rica	Team
Gold medal – first place	1946 Costa Rica	Team
Gold medal – first place	1948 Guatemala	Team
Gold medal – first place	1953 Costa Rica	Team
Gold medal – first place	1955 Honduras	Team
Gold medal – first place	1960 Cuba	Team
Gold medal – first place	1961 Costa Rica	Team
Silver medal – second place	1951 Panama	Team
Bronze medal – third place	1943 El Salvador	Team
Panamerican Championship
Bronze medal – third place	1956 Mexico	Team
Copa Centroamericana
Gold medal – first place	1991 Costa Rica	Team
Gold medal – first place	1997 Guatemala	Team
Gold medal – first place	1999 Cost Rica	Team
Gold medal – first place	2003 Panama	Team
Gold medal – first place	2005 Guatemala	Team
Gold medal – first place	2007 El Salvador	Team
Gold medal – first place	2013 Costa Rica	Team
Gold medal – first place	2014 United States	Team
Silver medal – second place	1993 Honduras	Team
Silver medal – second place	2001 Honduras	Team
Silver medal – second place	2009 Honduras	Team
Silver medal – second place	2011 Panama	Team
Central American and Caribbean Games
Silver medal – second place	1930 Havana	Team
Silver medal – second place	1935 San Salvador	Team
Silver medal – second place	1938 Panama City	Team
- Website: fcrf.cr/sele-mayor

The Costa Rica national football team (Spanish: Selección de fútbol de Costa Rica) represents Costa Rica in men's international football, and is governed by the Costa Rican Football Federation (Spanish: Federación Costarricense de Fútbol), the governing body for football in Costa Rica founded in 1921. It has been a full member of FIFA since 1927, is a founding member of CONCACAF which was founded in 1961, and is also a member of UNCAF in the Central American Zone. From 1938 to 1961, the team was a member of CCCF, the former governing body for football in Central America and Caribbean. Costa Rica was also a member of PFC, the former unified confederation of the Americas.

Costa Rica has qualified for the FIFA World Cup six times, it is one of five CONCACAF teams to have advanced to the knockout stage, reaching the quarter-finals in 2014 and also reaching the round of 16 in 1990. The team qualified twice for the Olympic Games (1980 and 1984).

Costa Rica has participated twenty-three times in CONCACAF's premier continental competition. It is the third most successful team in its confederation and the most successful Central American team, winning 3 CONCACAF Championship titles (1963, 1969 and 1989), becoming the first champions of the competition in 1963. The team's best performance under the CONCACAF Gold Cup format was finishing as runners-up in 2002. The team has participated five times in League A of the CONCACAF Nations League, finishing as fourth place in the 2021 finals.

Costa Rica has participated six times in the Copa América, reaching the quarter-finals (2001 and 2004), and also participated twice in the Panamerican Championship, finishing as third place in 1956. In subcontinental competitions, the team won 7 CCCF Championship titles and 8 Copa Centroamericana titles.

Costa Rica is the Central American team with the all-time highest average Football Elo Ranking with 1597.1, and the all-time highest Football Elo Ranking in Central America, with 1806 in 2014. Costa Rica achieved their best performance in history by finishing first in the Group D of the 2014 FIFA World Cup that consisted of three former World Cup champions: Uruguay, Italy, and England. During the round 16 they defeated Greece 5–3 via a penalty shoot-out after a 1–1 draw. They reached the quarter-finals for the first time but were defeated by the Netherlands in a penalty shoot-out (3–4) after a scoreless draw.

== History ==
=== Early history ===
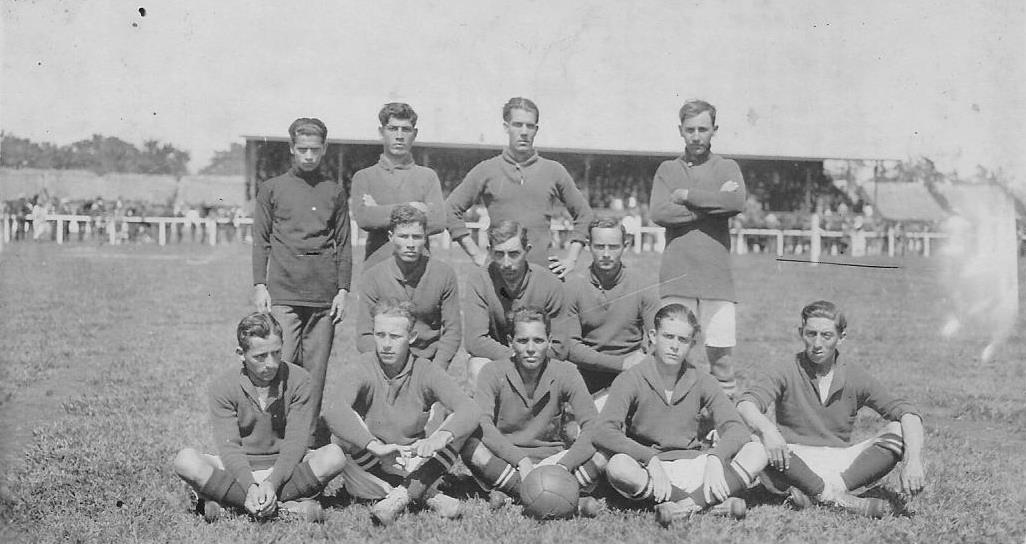
The first-ever Costa Rican squad at the Independence Centenary Games

The national team made its debut in the Independence Centenary Games held in Guatemala City in September 1921, winning their first game 7–0 against El Salvador. In the final, Costa Rica defeated 6–0 Guatemala to claim the trophy.

Costa Rica's team in the late 1940s acquired the nickname "The Gold Shorties". Throughout the '50s and '60s, they were the second strongest team in the CONCACAF zone behind Mexico, finishing runners-up in World Cup qualifying in the 1958, 1962 and 1966 qualifiers. Stars of the side during this period included Ruben Jimenez, Errol Daniels, Leonel Hernández and Edgar Marín. However, Costa Rica was not able to utilize this advantage, hence failed to reach any World Cup at that decade.

At the end of the 1960s their fortunes declined as Guatemala, Honduras, El Salvador, Haiti, Trinidad and Tobago, and Canada rose in prominence.

=== 1980s ===
Costa Rica failed to qualify for any of the World Cups in the 1970s and 1980s, and did not reach the final round of the CONCACAF qualifying until the 1986 qualifiers.

They participated in two consecutive Summer Olympic Games, in Moscow 1980 and in Los Angeles 1984. In 1980, Costa Rica competed against Yugoslavia, Finland and Iraq in Group D, losing 3–2, 3–0 and 3–0 respectively. In Los Angeles, the Ticos lost 3–0 against the United States, and 4–1 against Egypt, but beat a strong Italy team, which included Walter Zenga, Pietro Vierchowod, Franco Baresi and Aldo Serena, 1–0 with a goal by the midfielder Enrique Rivers.

=== 1990 World Cup ===

Costa Rica's starting lineup against Scotland at the 1990 FIFA World Cup

Costa Rica won the 1989 CONCACAF Championship to qualify for the finals of a World Cup for the first time. In the first round of the qualifiers, they beat Panama 3–1 on aggregate after a 2–0 away victory in the second leg, with goals by Juan Cayasso and Hernán Medford. They were drawn against Mexico in the second round, but advanced automatically when their opponents were disqualified for age fraud.

Costa Rica started the final qualifying group stage with a home victory and an away defeat against both Guatemala and the United States. They drew 1–1 with Trinidad and Tobago and then beat the same opponents 1–0 at home with a goal by Cayasso. They achieved an important away win, 4–2 against El Salvador at the Estadio Cuscatlán, with goals from Carlos Hidalgo, Cayasso and a brace from Leonidas Flores, before beating El Salvador 1–0 in San José with a goal from Pastor Fernández. They finished first in the group table, ahead of the United States on goal difference.

Team	Pld	W	D	L	GF	GA	GD	Pts
Costa Rica	8	5	1	2	10	6	+4	11
United States	8	4	3	1	6	3	+3	11
Trinidad and Tobago	8	3	3	2	7	5	+2	9
Guatemala	6	1	1	4	4	7	−3	3
El Salvador	6	0	2	4	2	8	−6	2

Source: RSSSF

Placed in Group C at the World Cup finals, Costa Rica began by beating Scotland 1–0 thanks to another goal by Cayasso. Although they lost to Brazil by the same score, they came from behind to beat Sweden 2–1 in their final group match to reach the knockout stages. There, they lost 4–1 to Czechoslovakia, for whom Tomáš Skuhravý scored a hat-trick.

Pos	Team	Pld	W	D	L	GF	GA	GD	Pts	Qualification
1	Brazil	3	3	0	0	4	1	+3	6	Advance to knockout stage
2	Costa Rica	3	2	0	1	3	2	+1	4	Advance to knockout stage
3	Scotland	3	1	0	2	2	3	−1	2	
4	Sweden	3	0	0	3	3	6	−3	0	

Source: FIFA
Rules for classification: Group stage tiebreakers

=== 2002 World Cup ===
After failing to qualify for the 1994 and 1998 editions of the World Cup, the Ticos placed first in qualification for the 2002 World Cup held in South Korea and Japan. During the qualifiers, Costa Rica were coached by Brazilian Gílson Nunes, and then by the naturalised Brazilian, Alexandre Guimarães. The first qualifying group stage began with an unexpected 2–1 defeat to Barbados. After this humiliation, Costa Rica beat the United States 2–1 at the Ricardo Saprissa Stadium, with goals from Rolando Fonseca and Hernán Medford. They then beat Guatemala 2–1 in the Estadio Alejandro Morera Soto, with two goals from Paulo Wanchope and Barbados 3–0 at the Ricardo Saprissa, with goals from Jafet Soto, Fonseca and Medford. A draw against the United States and a 2–1 defeat to Guatemala forced Costa Rica into a play-off against Guatemala in Miami. Costa Rica won 5–2 with two goals from Fonseca and one each from Wanchope, Reynaldo Parks and Jafeth Soto.

Costa Rica displayed fine attacking form during the final qualifying round, beginning with a 2–2 draw against Honduras at the Ricardo Saprissa, with goals from Fonseca and Rodrigo Cordero, and a 3–0 defeat of Trinidad and Tobago at the Morera Soto. Their only loss in this round came when the United States beat them 1–0. Costa Rica bounced back with a 2–1 win against Mexico in Mexico City, a match known as the Aztecazo, with goals from Fonseca and Medford. Further wins over Jamaica, Honduras and Trinidad and Tobago took Costa Rica to the brink of qualification, which they sealed with an emotional 2–0 win against the United States in the Saprissa, with a brace from Fonseca.

Pos	Team	Pld	W	D	L	GF	GA	GD	Pts	Qualification
1	Costa Rica	10	7	2	1	17	7	+10	23	Qualified to the 2002 FIFA World Cup
2	Mexico	10	5	2	3	16	9	+7	17	Qualified to the 2002 FIFA World Cup
3	United States	10	5	2	3	11	8	+3	17	Qualified to the 2002 FIFA World Cup
4	Honduras	10	4	2	4	17	17	0	14	
5	Jamaica	10	2	2	6	7	14	−7	8	
6	Trinidad and Tobago	10	1	2	7	5	18	−13	5	

Source: FIFA

In the finals, Costa Rica were drawn into Group C with Brazil, China, and Turkey. Their campaign started in Gwangju, where the Ticos beat China 2–0. In their second game against Turkey in Incheon, Winston Parks scored an 86th-minute goal to earn a 1–1 draw. Against Brazil, Costa Rica fought back from 3–0 down to 3–2 early in the second half, only to concede two further goals and lose 5–2. With Turkey beating China 3–0, Costa Rica finished behind Turkey on goal difference and were eliminated.

Pos	Team	Pld	W	D	L	GF	GA	GD	Pts	Qualification
1	Brazil	3	3	0	0	11	3	+8	9	Advance to knockout stage
2	Turkey	3	1	1	1	5	3	+2	4	Advance to knockout stage
3	Costa Rica	3	1	1	1	5	6	−1	4	
4	China	3	0	0	3	0	9	−9	0	

Source: FIFA
Rules for classification: Tie-breaking criteria

=== 2006 World Cup ===
Costa Rica again managed to qualify for the World Cup finals in 2006, albeit with difficulties that saw their American coach Steve Sampson depart after they required away goals to beat Cuba in the preliminary phase. The Colombian Jorge Luis Pinto took over for the next round, which began with a disastrous 5–2 defeat at home against Honduras and a 2–1 loss in Guatemala. Costa Rica recovered with two wins over Canada and a resounding 5–0 triumph over Guatemala, when Wanchope scored a hat-trick and Carlos Hernández and Fonseca added further goals. Costa Rica advanced to the hexagonal round by winning the group.

In the final round they started with a 2–1 defeat against Mexico at the Saprissa, before beating Panama by the same score, with goals from Wayne Wilson and Roy Myrie. Pinto was dismissed after a goalless draw with Trinidad and Tobago, and Guimarães returned as coach. His first match ended in a 3–0 defeat to the United States, but wins followed against Guatemala, Panama and Trinidad and Tobago. Costa Rica decisively beat the United States in the Saprissa, 3–0, with a goal from Wanchope and two from Hernández, to guarantee their third World Cup qualification.

Pos	Team	Pld	W	D	L	GF	GA	GD	Pts	Qualification	(United States)	(Mexico)	(Costa Rica)	(Trinidad and Tobago)	(Guatemala)	(Panama)
1	United States	10	7	1	2	16	6	+10	22 (Note: Tied on head-to-head points (3). Head-to-head goal difference: United States +1, Mexico −1.)	2006 FIFA World Cup	—	2–0	3–0	1–0	2–0	2–0
2	Mexico	10	7	1	2	22	9	+13	22	2006 FIFA World Cup	2–1	—	2–0	2–0	5–2	5–0
3	Costa Rica	10	5	1	4	15	14	+1	16	2006 FIFA World Cup	3–0	1–2	—	2–0	3–2	2–1
4	Trinidad and Tobago	10	4	1	5	10	15	−5	13	Inter-confederation play-offs	1–2	2–1	0–0	—	3–2	2–0
5	Guatemala	10	3	2	5	16	18	−2	11		0–0	0–2	3–1	5–1	—	2–1
6	Panama	10	0	2	8	4	21	−17	2		0–3	1–1	1–3	0–1	0–0	—

Notes:

On 9 June 2006, Costa Rica played their debut match in Munich in the opening match of the World Cup against the hosts, Germany. Wanchope scored to equalise after an early goal from Philipp Lahm, and later added another, but Costa Rica lost 4–2. They failed to match this encouraging performance in their remaining two games, losing 3–0 against Ecuador and 2–1 against Poland in a dead rubber.

Pos	Team	Pld	W	D	L	GF	GA	GD	Pts	Qualification
1	Germany (H)	3	3	0	0	8	2	+6	9	Advance to knockout stage
2	Ecuador	3	2	0	1	5	3	+2	6	Advance to knockout stage
3	Poland	3	1	0	2	2	4	−2	3	
4	Costa Rica	3	0	0	3	3	9	−6	0	

Source: FIFA
Rules for classification: Tie-breaking criteria
(H) Hosts

=== 2010 World Cup ===
Costa Rica began the qualifying competition for the 2010 World Cup against Grenada, winning 5–2 on aggregate (2–2, 3–0). They won all six games played in the next phase, against El Salvador (1–0, 3–1), Haiti (3–1, 2–0) and Suriname (7–0, 4–1).

With two games left in the Hexagonal round, Costa Rica trailed Honduras by one point in trying to win the third automatic qualification place behind the United States and Mexico. When Honduras lost 3–2 at home to the United States, Costa Rica overtook them with a 4–0 win against Trinidad and Tobago. Needing to win the final match in Washington, D.C. against the United States to ensure qualification, the Ticos led 2–0 at half-time, but Jonathan Bornstein scored an injury-time equaliser to draw the match 2–2. Meanwhile, Honduras's 1–0 victory over El Salvador moved them into third place in the group table on goal difference.

Costa Rica finished fourth, pushing them into a play-off with the fifth-placed team from the CONMEBOL region, Uruguay. The Ticos lost the first leg in San José 1–0, after a goal by Diego Lugano, and finished with ten men after Randall Azofeifa was sent off. In the second leg, played at the Estadio Centenario in Montevideo, Sebastián Abreu put Uruguay ahead twenty minutes from time, and although Walter Centeno equalised, the 1–1 draw sent Uruguay to the World Cup finals, 2–1 on aggregate.

After failing to qualify, the team began a new era, with the young talent of players such as Azofeifa, Keylor Navas, Cristian Bolaños, Michael Barrantes and Joel Campbell. Rónald González was the interim coach before Ricardo La Volpe was appointed in September 2010. He lasted only ten months before being replaced by the Colombian, Jorge Luis Pinto, in his second spell in charge. During this period, Costa Rica played many friendlies against the top-ranked teams in the world, including the world champion Spain, most of them in the new national stadium, the Estadio Nacional, which was opened in 2011.

=== 2014 World Cup ===
The Ticos' 2014 World Cup campaign began with a 2–2 draw against El Salvador in the third round of the qualifiers. They followed this with a 4–0 win over Guyana with a hat-trick by Álvaro Saborío. Two defeats to Mexico put the Ticos one defeat away from elimination, but they resurrected their campaign with a 1–0 win against El Salvador, with the only goal scored by José Miguel Cubero. They clinched a final round berth with a 7–0 win over Guyana, with goals scored by Randall Brenes, Saborío, Cristian Bolaños, Celso Borges and Cristian Gamboa.

The fourth round began with a 2–2 draw against Panama. In March, Costa Rica lost 1–0 against the United States in Denver, and launched an unsuccessful appeal against the match because of inclement weather. Costa Rica again fell 1–0 to the United States in the Gold Cup that June. Costa Rica then won 2–0 against Jamaica, beat Honduras 1–0 against, drew 0–0 at the Azteca against Mexico and won at home 2–0 against Panama. In September, they won 3–1 against the United States in San José.

On 10 September 2013, Costa Rica drew 1–1 with Jamaica, thanks to a goal from Brenes, to qualify with two games to spare. After a 1–0 loss at Honduras and 2–1 win over Mexico in October, Costa Rica finished second in the table, behind the United States.

Pos	Team	Pld	W	D	L	GF	GA	GD	Pts	Qualification	United States	Costa Rica	Honduras	Mexico	Panama	Jamaica
1	United States	10	7	1	2	15	8	+7	22	Qualification to 2014 FIFA World Cup	—	1–0	1–0	2–0	2–0	2–0
2	Costa Rica	10	5	3	2	13	7	+6	18	Qualification to 2014 FIFA World Cup	3–1	—	1–0	2–1	2–0	2–0
3	Honduras	10	4	3	3	13	12	+1	15	Qualification to 2014 FIFA World Cup	2–1	1–0	—	2–2	2–2	2–0
4	Mexico	10	2	5	3	7	9	−2	11	Advance to inter-confederation play-offs	0–0	0–0	1–2	—	2–1	0–0
5	Panama	10	1	5	4	10	14	−4	8		2–3	2–2	2–0	0–0	—	0–0
6	Jamaica	10	0	5	5	5	13	−8	5		1–2	1–1	2–2	0–1	1–1	—

Costa Rica were drawn in finals Group D against three previous tournament winners – Italy, England and Uruguay – and were given odds of 2500–1 to win the tournament. However, they beat Uruguay and Italy and drew 0–0 with England to finish top of the group and qualify for the knockout stage.

Pos	Team	Pld	W	D	L	GF	GA	GD	Pts	Qualification
1	Costa Rica	3	2	1	0	4	1	+3	7	Advance to knockout stage
2	Uruguay	3	2	0	1	4	4	0	6	Advance to knockout stage
3	Italy	3	1	0	2	2	3	−1	3	
4	England	3	0	1	2	2	4	−2	1	

Source: FIFA
Rules for classification: Tie-breaking criteria

In the second round, they beat Greece 5–3 on penalties after a 1–1 draw, seeing them through to the quarter-finals for the first time. There, they held the Netherlands to a 0–0 draw after extra time, before losing 4–3 on penalties. Costa Rica rose 12 places to 16th in the FIFA World Rankings. Former player Rónald González cited their long-term progress since 2007 as the reason for their achievement.

=== 2018 World Cup ===
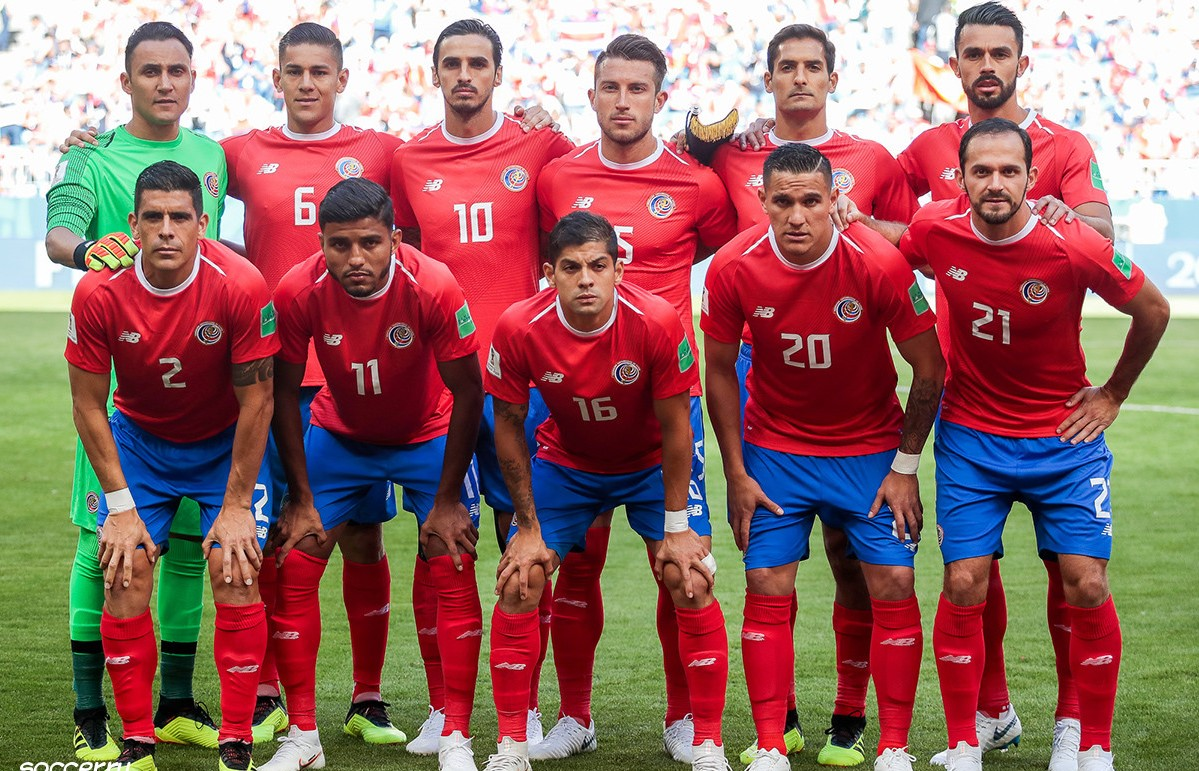
Costa Rica national team at the 2018 World Cup in Russia

The Ticos' qualification for the 2018 World Cup started with a bye to the fourth qualifying round, where they won five games and drew one, winning their group. In the final round, they finished second behind Mexico to qualify automatically, winning four matches, drawing four and losing two.

Pos	Team	Pld	W	D	L	GF	GA	GD	Pts	Qualification	(Mexico)	(Costa Rica)	(Panama)	(Honduras)	(United States)	(Trinidad and Tobago)
1	Mexico	10	6	3	1	16	7	+9	21	Qualification to 2018 FIFA World Cup	—	2–0	1–0	3–0	1–1	3–1
2	Costa Rica	10	4	4	2	14	8	+6	16	Qualification to 2018 FIFA World Cup	1–1	—	0–0	1–1	4–0	2–1
3	Panama	10	3	4	3	9	10	−1	13	Qualification to 2018 FIFA World Cup	0–0	2–1	—	2–2	1–1	3–0
4	Honduras	10	3	4	3	13	19	−6	13	Advance to inter-confederation play-offs	3–2	1–1	0–1	—	1–1	3–1
5	United States	10	3	3	4	17	13	+4	12		1–2	0–2	4–0	6–0	—	2–0
6	Trinidad and Tobago	10	2	0	8	7	19	−12	6		0–1	0–2	1–0	1–2	2–1	—

Source: FIFA
Rules for classification: Qualification tiebreakers

Costa Rica were drawn in Group E alongside Brazil, Switzerland and Serbia. Many key players from 2014 remained in the squad, but they made a disappointing exit at the group stage. Costa Rica lost their first two games, against Serbia and Brazil, without scoring, but drew 2–2 with Switzerland in their last match after equalising in injury time.

Pos	Team	Pld	W	D	L	GF	GA	GD	Pts	Qualification
1	Brazil	3	2	1	0	5	1	+4	7	Advance to knockout stage
2	Switzerland	3	1	2	0	5	4	+1	5	Advance to knockout stage
3	Serbia	3	1	0	2	2	4	−2	3	
4	Costa Rica	3	0	1	2	2	5	−3	1	

Source: FIFA
Rules for classification: Group stage tiebreakers

=== 2022 World Cup ===
The Ticos' qualification for the 2022 World Cup started with a bye to the final qualifying round. They finished fourth behind the United States to advance to inter-confederation play-offs winning seven matches, drawing four and losing three. In the inter-confederation play-offs in Al Rayyan, Qatar, Costa Rica won the match 1–0 against New Zealand and qualified for the World Cup.

Pos	Team	Pld	W	D	L	GF	GA	GD	Pts	Qualification
1	Canada	14	8	4	2	23	7	+16	28	2022 FIFA World Cup
2	Mexico	14	8	4	2	17	8	+9	28	2022 FIFA World Cup
3	United States	14	7	4	3	21	10	+11	25	2022 FIFA World Cup
4	Costa Rica	14	7	4	3	13	8	+5	25	Inter-confederation play-offs
5	Panama	14	6	3	5	17	19	−2	21	
6	Jamaica	14	2	5	7	12	22	−10	11	
7	El Salvador	14	2	4	8	8	18	−10	10	
8	Honduras	14	0	4	10	7	26	−19	4	

Source: FIFA, CONCACAF
Rules for classification: Tiebreakers
14 June 2022
21:00 UTC+3

Costa Rica	1–0	New Zealand
Campbell 3'	Report

Ahmad bin Ali Stadium, Al Rayyan (Qatar)
Attendance: 10,803
Referee: Mohammed Abdulla Hassan Mohamed (United Arab Emirates)

On November 23, 2022, Costa Rica lost 7–0 against Spain, the biggest World Cup loss since 2010. This match also tied for their worst defeat in professional football with a match against Mexico, which ended with Mexico 7–0 Costa Rica in Mexico City on 17 August 1975. They came back to defeat Japan in the next game, and after falling behind to Germany in the first half in the final group stage match, they scored two second half goals against to briefly move into position to advance to the knockout rounds in the live standings. However, Germany scored three late goals and eliminated Costa Rica. For a couple of minutes Costa Rica and Japan were making history, with results that would've eliminated both Spain and Germany, two powerhouses of international football. Nevertheless, Costa Rica were bested by Germany's experience in the international stage.

Pos	Team	Pld	W	D	L	GF	GA	GD	Pts	Qualification
1	Japan	3	2	0	1	4	3	+1	6	Advance to knockout stage
2	Spain	3	1	1	1	9	3	+6	4	Advance to knockout stage
3	Germany	3	1	1	1	6	5	+1	4	
4	Costa Rica	3	1	0	2	3	11	−8	3	

Source: FIFA
Rules for classification: Group stage tiebreakers

=== 2026 World Cup – Failed campaign ===
In June 2024, Costa Rica began its qualifying campaign, against Saint Kitts and Nevis, Grenada, Bahamas and Trinidad and Tobago, winning all 4 games and finishing in first place. Because the tournament was being played at North America, United States, Mexico and Canada qualified automatically as co-hosts, leaving 3 spots for more CONCACAF countries to qualify.

In the second round, they were placed in Group C, along with Haiti, Honduras and Nicaragua. Costa Rica got a draw in its first match 1–1 against Nicaragua, a 3–3 draw at home against Haiti and getting a 0–0 draw against Honduras. Costa Rica had to win all matches remaining if they were to finish first. The "Ticos" got their first win, 4–1 at home against Nicaragua, but at the next match, they got defeated 1–0 against Haiti. By this point, Costa Rica had 6 points, and needed to win against Honduras while hoping Haiti would lose or draw against Nicaragua to finish first. On the final matchday, Nicaragua lost to Haiti 2–0, and the match between Costa Rica and Honduras finished 0–0. With this result, Haiti qualified for the World Cup in the first time since 1974, while both Costa Rica and Honduras were eliminated. This was Costa Rica's first failed qualification campaign since 2010.

Shortly after, the FCRF announced that Miguel Herrera, the head coach had been sacked for not being able to qualify for the World Cup. The fans were angry with both the players and the coach for not qualifying for the "easiest qualification competition".

Pos	Team	Pld	W	D	L	GF	GA	GD	Pts	Qualification	(Haiti)	(Honduras)	(Costa Rica)	(Nicaragua)
1	Haiti	6	3	2	1	9	6	+3	11	2026 FIFA World Cup	—	0–0	1–0	2–0
2	Honduras	6	2	3	1	5	2	+3	9		3–0	—	0–0	2–0
3	Costa Rica	6	1	4	1	8	6	+2	7		3–3	0–0	—	4–1
4	Nicaragua	6	1	1	4	4	12	−8	4		0–3	2–0	1–1	—

Source: FIFA
Rules for classification: Tiebreakers

== Home stadium ==
Estadio Nacional is the home stadium of the Costa Rica national team since its opening on 10 January 2011 This venue hosts their friendly matches as well as the World Cup qualifying matches against CONCACAF rivals. Previous matches were played in Estadio Ricardo Saprissa or in Estadio Alejandro Morera Soto.

== Team image ==
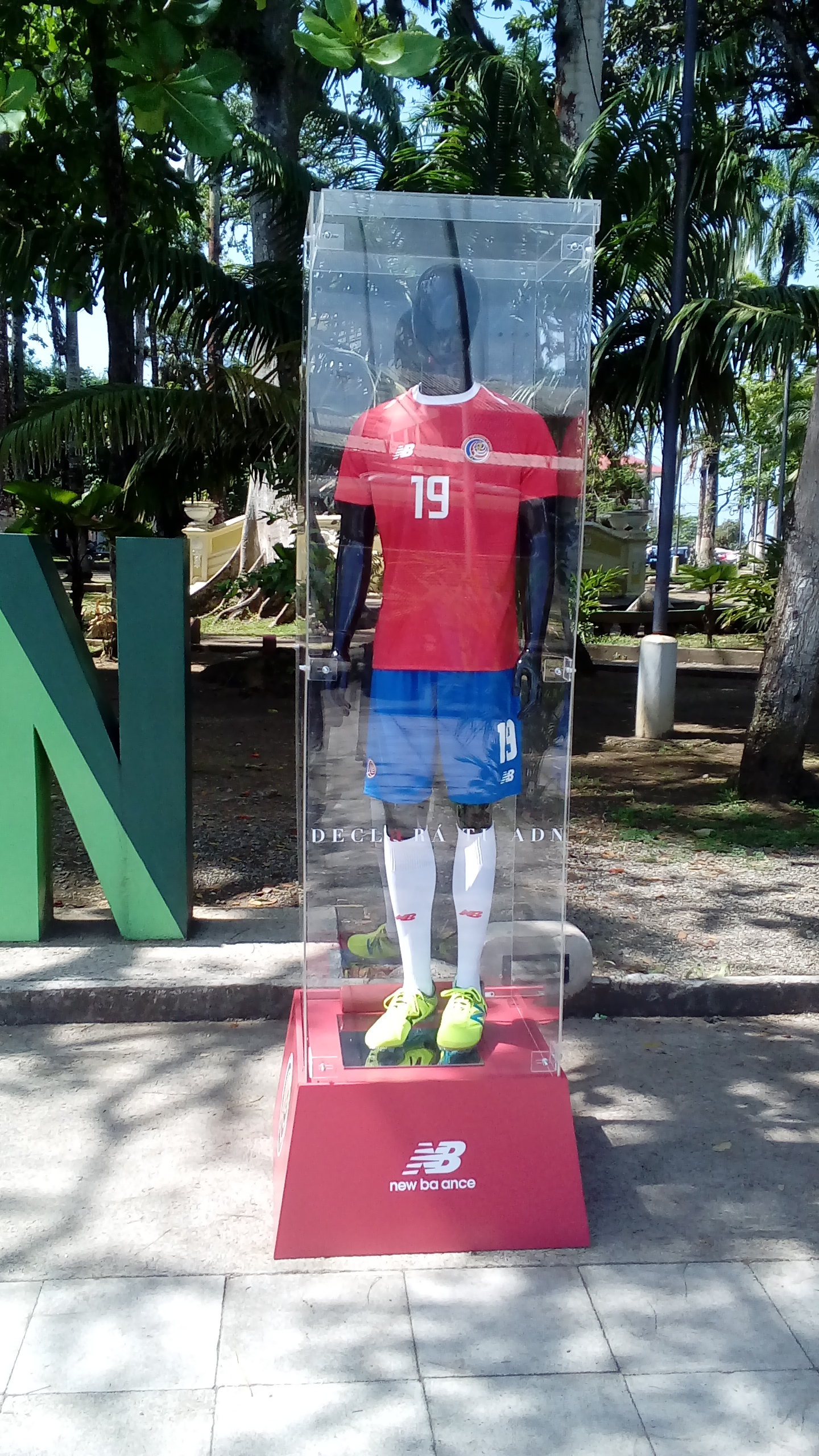
Costa Rica's 2018 FIFA World Cup kit showcased in Limón

Costa Rica traditionally wears a red jersey with blue shorts and white socks. Their away kit historically was a Juventus-style black and white striped jersey with white shorts and white or black socks, due to these colors being the ones of CS La Libertad, one of the oldest clubs in Costa Rica. In the 1990 FIFA World Cup, the striped kit was used for two matches due to its resemblance to the home kit of FK Partizan of which Bora Milutinovic, then-coach of Costa Rica, was a fan. However, after 1997, the striped kit was replaced by a white kit. In 2015, Boston-based sportswear company New Balance became the provider of the national team, after taking over for Italian company Lotto. Since 2023, Adidas is the kit provider for the national team.

=== Kit sponsorship ===
Supplier	Period
(Costa Rica) Desport	1980–1989
(Italy) Lotto	1990–1994
(United States) Reebok	1995–1999
(Costa Rica) Trooper	1999
(Mexico) Atletica	2000–2001
(Spain) Joma	2001–2007
(Italy) Lotto	2007–2014
(United States) New Balance	2015–2022
(Germany) Adidas	2023–present

== Results and fixtures ==
The following is a list of match results in the last 12 months, as well as any future matches that have been scheduled.

Win Draw Loss Fixture

=== 2026 ===
27 March 2026 Jordan International Tournament	Jordan	2–2	Costa Rica	Antalya, Turkey (Note: The four mini tournament between Jordan, Iran, Nigeria, and Costa Rica were moved from Amman, Jordan to Antalya, Turkey due to the travel restrictions from the 2026 Iran war.)
20:30 UTC+3	Faisal 50' (pen.); Sabra 76'	Report	Alcócer 84'; Madrigal 90+1'	Stadium: Mardan Sports Complex; Referee: Kadir Sağlam (Turkey)

31 March 2026 Jordan International Tournament	Costa Rica	0–5	Iran	Antalya, Turkey
16:00 UTC+3		Report	Gholizadeh 10'; Taremi 19' (pen.), 34' (pen.); Mohebi 31'; Ghayedi 54'	Stadium: Corendon Airlines Park; Referee: Cihan Aydin (Turkey)

1 June Friendly	Colombia	3–1	Costa Rica	Bogotá, Colombia
18:00 UTC−5	Sánchez 17'; Díaz 23'; Suárez 81'	Report	Soto 33'	Stadium: El Campín; Attendance: 11,806; Referee: Guillermo Guerrero (Ecuador)

10 June Friendly	England	3–0	Costa Rica	Orlando, United States
16:00 UTC−4	Rice 9'; Gordon 68' (pen.); Watkins 87'	Report		Stadium: Inter&Co Stadium; Attendance: 20,341; Referee: Katja Koroleva (United States)

24 September 2026–27 Nations League	Costa Rica	3–4	Curaçao	San José, Costa Rica
20:00 UTC−6	Sinclair 3'; Mora 23', 45+1'	Report	Gorré 62', 78'; Chong 66'; Paulina 83'	Stadium: Estadio Ricardo Saprissa Aymá; Attendance: 8,388; Referee: Mario Escobar (Guatemala)

27 September 2026–27 Nations League	Haiti	2–0	Costa Rica	Kingston, Jamaica
18:00 UTC−5	Bellegarde 9'; Calvo 39' (o.g.)	Report		Stadium: Sabina Park; Attendance: 317; Referee: Iván Barton (El Salvador)

1 October 2026–27 Nations League	Nicaragua	0–3	Costa Rica	Managua, Nicaragua
20:00 UTC−6		Report	Sinclair 57'; Mora 60'; Michel 90+7'	Stadium: Estadio Nacional de Fútbol; Attendance: 14,745; Referee: Walter López (Guatemala)

4 October 2026–27 Nations League	Costa Rica	2–0	Haiti	San José, Costa Rica
18:00 UTC−6	Mora 6'; Soto 21'	Report		Stadium: Estadio Ricardo Saprissa Aymá; Referee: Armando Villarreal (United States)

13 November Friendly	Ecuador	2–0	Costa Rica	Quito, Ecuador
19:00 UTC−5	J. Caicedo 22'; M. Caicedo 83' (pen.)	Report		Stadium: Estadio Olímpico Atahualpa; Referee: Bruno Pérez (Peru)

17 November Friendly	Argentina	7–0	Costa Rica	Córdoba, Argentina
20:00 UTC−3	Paz 8', 38'; Álvarez 35', 43'; Mastantuono 48', 88'; Mac Allister 78'	Report		Stadium: Estadio Mario Alberto Kempes; Referee: Bruno Arleu de Araújo (Brazil)

=== 2027 ===
March 2027 Gold Cup prelims	Puerto Rico	v	Costa Rica	Puerto Rico

March 2027 Gold Cup prelims	Costa Rica	v	Puerto Rico	Costa Rica

== Coaching staff ==
Position	Name
Head coach	(Costa Rica) Bryan Ruiz
Assistant coach	(Argentina) Nicolás Batista
Goalkeeper's coach	(Costa Rica) Ricardo González
Fitness coach 1	Vacant
Video analyst	(Argentina) Carlos Di Pasqua
Doctor	(Costa Rica) Alejandro Ramírez
Physiotherapist	(Costa Rica) Martha Sisfontes
Physiotherapist	(Costa Rica) Brayner Sánchez
Nutritionist	(Costa Rica) Alhelí Mateos
Massage therapist	(Costa Rica) Óscar Segura
Props	(Costa Rica) Randall Obando
Props	(Costa Rica) Alberto Mena
Team administrator	(Costa Rica) Alvaro Herrera
Sporting director	(Argentina) Claudio Vivas

=== Coaching history ===
Caretaker managers are listed in italics.

- (Costa Rica) Eladio Rosabal Cordero (1921)
- (Costa Rica) Manolo Rodríguez (1930)
- (El Salvador) Ricardo Saprissa (1935–1938)
- (Costa Rica) Alejandro Morera Soto (1941, 1943)
- (Costa Rica) Jorge Rojas (1943)
- (Costa Rica) Hernán Bolaños (1946); (1948)
- (England) Randolph Galloway & (Costa Rica) Hernán Bolaños (1946)
- (Costa Rica) Santiago Bonilla (1950)
- (Costa Rica) Ismael Quesada (1951)
- (El Salvador) Ricardo Saprissa & (Costa Rica) Luis Cartín Paniagua (1951)
- (Brazil) Otto Bumbel (1953)
- (Costa Rica) Alfredo Piedra (1955–1957)
- (Uruguay) Rubén Amorín (1960)
- (Chile) Hugo Tassara (1960)
- (Spain) Eduardo Toba Muíño (1961)
- (Costa Rica) Alfredo Piedra (1961–1963)
- (Spain) Eduardo Viso Abella, (Costa Rica) Alfredo Piedra, & (Costa Rica) Mario "Catato" Cordero (1965)
- (Costa Rica) Rodolfo Ulloa Antillón (1967–1968)
- (Hungary) Américo Brunner (1968)
- (Costa Rica) Rogelio Rojas (1969)
- (Costa Rica) Marvin Rodríguez (1969, 1971, 1975, 1989–1990, 1992, 1999–2000)
- (Spain) Eduardo Viso Abella (1970)
- (Argentina) Humberto Maschio (1972)
- (Uruguay) José Etchegoyen (1975)
- (Costa Rica) Juan José Gámez (1976)
- (Spain) Antonio Moyano (1979–1980, 1983–1984, 1994)
- (Czechoslovakia) Ivan Mráz (1980)
- (Brazil) Odir Jacques (1985)
- (Costa Rica) Álvaro Grant MacDonald (1985, 1993)
- (Uruguay) Gustavo De Simone (1987–1989)
- (Spain) Antonio Moyano & (Costa Rica) Marvin Rodríguez (1989)
- (Socialist Federal Republic of Yugoslavia) Bora Milutinović (1990)
- (Costa Rica) Rolando Villalobos (1991, 1998)
- (Uruguay) Héctor Núñez (1992)
- (Costa Rica) Juan José Gámez (1993)
- (Spain) Juan Luis Hernández Fuertes (1993–1994, 1997)
- (Costa Rica) Toribio Rojas (1994–1995)
- (Costa Rica) Juan Blanco (1995)
- (Brazil) Valdeir Vieira (1996)
- (Argentina) Horacio Cordero (1997)
- (Colombia) Francisco Maturana (1998–1999)
- (Brazil) Gílson Nunes (2000)
- (Costa Rica) Alexandre Guimarães (2001–2002, 2005–2006)
- (Costa Rica) Rodrigo Kenton (2002)
- (United States) Steve Sampson (2003–2004)
- (Colombia) Jorge Luis Pinto (2004–2005, 2011–2014)
- (Costa Rica) Carlos Watson (2006)
- (Costa Rica) Hernán Medford (2007–2008)
- (Costa Rica) Rodrigo Kenton (2008–2009)
- (Brazil) Renê Simões (2009)
- (Costa Rica) Rónald González (2010, 2018)
- (Argentina) Ricardo La Volpe (2010–2011)
- (Costa Rica) Paulo Wanchope (2014–2015)
- (Costa Rica) Óscar Ramírez (2015–2018)
- (Uruguay) Gustavo Matosas (2018–2019)
- (Costa Rica) Douglas Sequeira (2019)
- (Costa Rica) Rónald González Brenes (2019–2021)
- (Colombia) Luis Fernando Suárez (2021–2023)
- (Argentina) Claudio Vivas (2023)
- (Argentina) Gustavo Alfaro (2023–2024)
- (Argentina) Claudio Vivas (2024)
- (Mexico) Miguel Herrera (2025)
- (Argentina) Fernando Batista (2026)
- (Costa Rica) Bryan Ruiz (2026)
- (Costa Rica) Bryan Ruiz (2026–present)

== Players ==
=== Current squad ===
The following players were called up for the friendly matches against Colombia and England on 1 and 10 June 2026.
Caps and goals correct as of 10 June 2026, after the match against England.

No.	Pos.	Player	Date of birth (age)	Caps	Goals	Club
	GK	Patrick Sequeira	1 March 1999 (age 27)	18	0	(Portuguese Football Federation) Casa Pia
	GK	Abraham Madriz	2 April 2004 (age 22)	1	0	(Costa Rican Football Federation) Saprissa
	GK	Bayron Mora	5 May 2003 (age 23)	0	0	(Costa Rican Football Federation) Alajuelense
	DF	Jeyland Mitchell	29 September 2004 (age 22)	22	2	(French Football Federation) Strasbourg
	DF	Haxzel Quirós	3 June 1998 (age 28)	17	0	(Costa Rican Football Federation) Herediano
	DF	Fernán Faerrón	22 August 2000 (age 26)	10	0	(Costa Rican Football Federation) Cartaginés
	DF	Aarón Salazar	15 May 1999 (age 27)	6	0	(Costa Rican Football Federation) Alajuelense
	DF	Darril Araya	8 November 2000 (age 26)	3	0	(Costa Rican Football Federation) Herediano
	DF	John Ruiz	27 December 2004 (age 21)	2	0	(Costa Rican Football Federation) Alajuelense
	DF	Shawn Johnson	28 February 2003 (age 23)	1	0	(Costa Rican Football Federation) Municipal Liberia
	DF	Joseth Peraza	9 December 2004 (age 21)	1	0	(Hungarian Football Federation) Zalaegerszeg
	DF	Farbod Samadian	6 February 2005 (age 21)	0	0	(Costa Rican Football Federation) Alajuelense
	MF	Orlando Galo	11 August 2000 (age 26)	33	4	(Latvian Football Federation) Riga
	MF	Carlos Mora	18 March 2001 (age 25)	21	0	(Romanian Football Federation) Universitatea Craiova
	MF	Cristopher Núñez	8 December 1997 (age 28)	14	0	(Hellenic Football Federation) Atromitos
	MF	Andrey Soto	8 April 2003 (age 23)	4	1	(Costa Rican Football Federation) Pérez Zeledón
	MF	Luis Flores	23 January 1994 (age 32)	3	0	(Costa Rican Football Federation) Cartaginés
	MF	Gian Mauro Morera	31 August 2005 (age 21)	0	0	(Costa Rican Football Federation) Guadalupe
	MF	Sebastián Padilla	1 March 2005 (age 21)	0	0	(Costa Rican Football Federation) Municipal Liberia
	FW	Manfred Ugalde	25 May 2002 (age 24)	32	11	(Russian Football Union) Spartak Moscow
	FW	Josimar Alcócer	7 July 2004 (age 22)	30	7	(Football Association of the Czech Republic) Sparta Prague
	FW	Álvaro Zamora	9 March 2002 (age 24)	25	5	(Portuguese Football Federation) Académico de Viseu
	FW	Orlando Sinclair	19 April 1998 (age 28)	3	0	(Costa Rican Football Federation) Saprissa
	FW	Doryan Rodríguez	18 January 2003 (age 23)	1	0	(Costa Rican Football Federation) Puntarenas

=== Recent call-ups ===
The following players have been called up within the last twelve months.

Pos.	Player	Date of birth (age)	Caps	Goals	Club	Latest call-up
GK	Christopher Moya	1 September 2004 (age 22)	0	0	(Costa Rica) Cartaginés	v. Colombia, 1 June 2026 ^{PRE}
GK	Kevin Chamorro	8 April 2000 (age 26)	9	0	(Portugal) Rio Ave	Jordan International Tournament
GK	Keylor Navas (captain)	15 December 1986 (age 39)	125	0	(Mexico) UNAM	v. Honduras, 18 November 2025
DF	Jorkaeff Azofeifa	9 February 2001 (age 25)	1	0	(Costa Rica) Saprissa	v. Colombia, 1 June 2026 ^{PRE}
DF	Juan Pablo Vargas	6 June 1995 (age 31)	41	3	(Mexico) Puebla	Jordan International Tournament
DF	Gerald Taylor	28 May 2001 (age 25)	8	1	(Costa Rica) Saprissa	Jordan International Tournament
DF	Guillermo Villalobos	7 June 2001 (age 25)	4	0	(Costa Rica) Alajuelense	Jordan International Tournament
DF	Santiago van der Putten	25 June 2004 (age 22)	3	0	(Costa Rica) Alajuelense	Jordan International Tournament ^{INJ}
DF	Francisco Calvo	8 July 1992 (age 34)	108	13	(Uruguay) Nacional	v. Honduras, 18 November 2025
DF	Kendall Waston	1 January 1988 (age 38)	78	10	(Costa Rica) Saprissa	v. Honduras, 18 November 2025
DF	Joseph Mora	15 January 1993 (age 33)	21	1	(Costa Rica) Saprissa	v. Honduras, 18 November 2025
DF	Julio Cascante	3 October 1993 (age 33)	12	1	Unattached	v. Honduras, 18 November 2025
DF	Alexis Gamboa	20 March 1999 (age 27)	12	1	(Costa Rica) Alajuelense	v. Honduras, 18 November 2025
MF	Alejandro Bran	5 March 2001 (age 25)	20	3	(Romania) Petrolul Ploiești	v. Colombia, 1 June 2026 ^{PRE}
MF	Jefferson Brenes	13 April 1997 (age 29)	18	1	(Costa Rica) Saprissa	Jordan International Tournament
MF	Jewison Bennette	15 June 2004 (age 22)	14	2	(Ukraine) LNZ Cherkasy	Jordan International Tournament
MF	Douglas López	21 September 1998 (age 28)	4	0	(Costa Rica) Cartaginés	Jordan International Tournament
MF	Creichel Pérez	11 November 2004 (age 22)	1	0	(Costa Rica) Alajuelense	Jordan International Tournament
MF	Celso Borges	27 May 1988 (age 38)	164	27	(Costa Rica) Alajuelense	v. Honduras, 18 November 2025
MF	Aarón Murillo	20 March 1998 (age 28)	4	0	(Costa Rica) Herediano	v. Honduras, 18 November 2025
FW	Warren Madrigal	24 July 2004 (age 22)	24	6	(United States) Nashville	v. Colombia, 1 June 2026 ^{PRE}
FW	Kenneth Vargas	17 April 2002 (age 24)	19	3	(Greece) Kalamata	v. Colombia, 1 June 2026 ^{PRE}
FW	Andy Rojas	5 December 2005 (age 20)	17	1	(United States) New York Red Bulls	Jordan International Tournament
FW	Joel Campbell	26 June 1992 (age 34)	143	24	(Costa Rica) Inter San Carlos	v. Honduras, 18 November 2025
FW	Alonso Martínez	15 October 1998 (age 28)	29	8	(United States) New York City	v. Honduras, 18 November 2025
FW	Anthony Hernández	10 November 2001 (age 25)	5	1	(Costa Rica) Alajuelense	v. Honduras, 18 November 2025
^{INJ} Withdrew due to injury.^{RET} Retired from the national team.^{ILL} Withdrew due to illness.^{PRE} Preliminary squad.^{WD} Withdrew for personal reasons.

== Records ==
As of 4 October 2026
Players in bold are still active with Costa Rica.

=== Most appearances ===
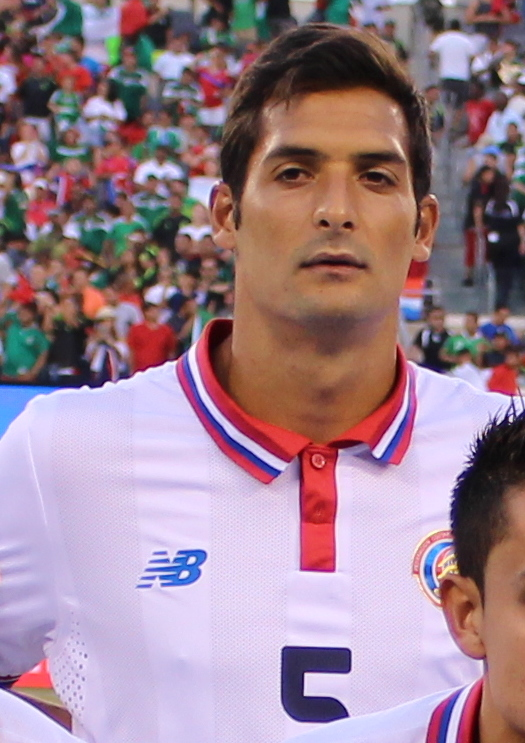
Celso Borges is Costa Rica's most capped player with 166 appearances.

Rank	Player	Caps	Goals	Career
1	**Celso Borges**	166	27	2008–present
2	**Joel Campbell**	150	27	2011–present
3	Bryan Ruiz	147	29	2005–2022
4	Walter Centeno	137	24	1995–2009
5	**Keylor Navas**	129	0	2008–present
6	Luis Marín	128	5	1993–2009
7	**Francisco Calvo**	119	15	2011–present
8	Rolando Fonseca	113	47	1992–2011
9	Álvaro Saborío	112	36	2002–2021
10	Mauricio Solís	110	6	1993–2006

=== Top goalscorers ===
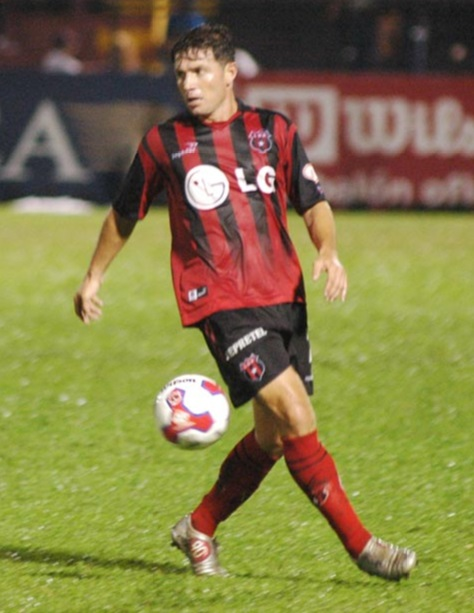
Rolando Fonseca is Costa Rica's all-time top scorer with 47 goals.

Rank	Player	Goals	Caps	Ratio	Career
1	Rolando Fonseca	47	113	0.42	1992–2011
2	Paulo Wanchope	45	73	0.62	1996–2008
3	Álvaro Saborío	36	112	0.32	2002–2021
4	Bryan Ruiz	29	147	0.2	2005–2022
5	Juan Ulloa	27	27	1	1955–1970
5	**Joel Campbell**	27	150	0.18	2011–present
5	**Celso Borges**	27	166	0.16	2008–present
8	Rónald Gómez	24	91	0.26	1993–2008
8	Walter Centeno	24	137	0.18	1995–2009
10	Jorge Monge	23	27	0.85	1955–1961

== Competitive record ==
=== FIFA World Cup ===
FIFA World Cup record										Qualification record						
Year	Round	Position	Pld	W	D	L	GF	GA	Squad	Pld	W	D	L	GF	GA	—
(Uruguay) 1930	Did not enter									Declined invitation						
(Italy) 1934	Did not enter									Did not enter						
(France) 1938	Withdrew									Withdrew						
(Brazil) 1950	Did not enter									Did not enter						
(Switzerland) 1954	Entry not accepted by FIFA									Entry not accepted by FIFA						
(Sweden) 1958	Did not qualify									6	4	1	1	16	7	1958
(Chile) 1962	Did not qualify									9	5	1	3	22	14	1962
(England) 1966	Did not qualify									8	5	2	1	17	3	1966
(Mexico) 1970	Did not qualify									4	2	1	1	7	3	1970
(West Germany) 1974	Did not qualify									2	0	1	1	4	5	1973
(Argentina) 1978	Did not qualify									6	1	4	1	8	6	1978
(Spain) 1982	Did not qualify									8	1	4	3	6	10	1981
(Mexico) 1986	Did not qualify									8	2	5	1	10	8	1986
(Italy) 1990	Round of 16	13th	4	2	0	2	4	6	Squad	10	6	2	2	13	7	1990
(United States) 1994	Did not qualify									8	4	0	4	16	11	1994
(France) 1998	Did not qualify									16	7	3	6	22	17	1998
(South Korea) (Japan) 2002	Group stage	19th	3	1	1	1	5	6	Squad	17	11	3	3	31	10	2002
(Germany) 2006	Group stage	31st	3	0	0	3	3	9	Squad	18	8	4	6	30	25	2006
(South Africa) 2010	Did not qualify									20	12	3	5	41	22	2010
(Brazil) 2014	Quarter-finals	8th	5	2	3	0	5	2	Squad	16	8	4	4	27	12	2014
(Russia) 2018	Group stage	29th	3	0	1	2	2	5	Squad	16	9	5	2	25	11	2018
(Qatar) 2022	Group stage	27th	3	1	0	2	3	11	Squad	15	8	4	3	14	8	2022
(Canada) (Mexico) (United States) 2026	Did not qualify									10	5	4	1	25	7	2026
(Morocco) (Portugal) (Spain) 2030	To be determined									To be determined						2030
(Saudi Arabia) 2034	To be determined									To be determined						2034
Total	Quarter-finals	6/23	21	6	5	10	22	39	—	197	98	51	48	334	191	—

FIFA World Cup history
First match	Costa Rica 1–0 Scotland (11 June 1990; Genoa, Italy)
Biggest win	Uruguay 1–3 Costa Rica (14 June 2014; Fortaleza, Brazil)
Biggest defeat	Spain 7–0 Costa Rica (23 November 2022; Doha, Qatar)
Best result	Quarter-finals (2014)
Worst result	Group stage (2002, 2006, 2018, 2022)

*Draws include knockout matches decided via penalty shoot-out.

=== CONCACAF Gold Cup ===
CONCACAF Championship & Gold Cup record										Qualification record					
Year	Round	Position	Pld	W	D	L	GF	GA	Squad	Pld	W	D	L	GF	GA
(El Salvador) 1963	Champions	1st	6	5	1	0	14	2	Squad	Qualified automatically					
(Guatemala) 1965	Third place	3rd	5	2	2	1	11	4	Squad	Automatically entered					
(Honduras) 1967	Did not enter									Did not enter					
(Costa Rica) 1969	Champions	1st	5	4	1	0	13	2	Squad	Qualified as hosts					
(Trinidad and Tobago) 1971	Third place	3rd	5	2	1	2	6	5	Squad	Qualified as defending champions					
(Haiti) 1973	Did not qualify									2	0	1	1	4	5
(Mexico) 1977	Did not qualify									6	1	4	1	8	6
(Honduras) 1981	Did not qualify									8	1	4	3	6	10
1985	Third place	3rd	8	2	5	1	10	8	Squad	5	1	0	4	5	9
1989	Champions	1st	8	5	1	2	10	6	Squad	Qualified automatically					
(United States) 1991	Fourth place	4th	5	1	0	4	5	9	Squad	Qualified as defending champions					
(Mexico) (United States) 1993	Third place	3rd	5	1	3	1	6	5	Squad	5	4	0	1	11	2
(United States) 1996	Did not qualify									4	1	1	2	5	6
(United States) 1998	Group stage	5th	2	1	0	1	8	4	Squad	5	3	2	0	12	3
(United States) 2000	Quarter-finals	6th	3	0	2	1	5	6	Squad	5	3	0	2	13	3
(United States) 2002	Runners-up	2nd	5	3	1	1	8	5	Squad	5	2	2	1	8	5
(Mexico) (United States) 2003	Fourth place	4th	5	2	0	3	10	8	Squad	5	4	1	0	5	1
(United States) 2005	Quarter-finals	6th	4	2	1	1	6	4	Squad	4	3	1	0	8	2
(United States) 2007	Quarter-finals	7th	4	1	1	2	3	4	Squad	4	2	1	1	6	3
(United States) 2009	Semi-finals	4th	5	2	2	1	10	6	Squad	4	3	1	0	9	1
(United States) 2011	Quarter-finals	5th	4	1	2	1	8	6	Squad	4	1	2	1	5	4
(United States) 2013	Quarter-finals	5th	4	2	0	2	4	2	Squad	5	4	1	0	6	1
(Canada) (United States) 2015	Quarter-finals	7th	4	0	3	1	3	4	Squad	3	2	1	0	7	3
(United States) 2017	Semi-finals	4th	5	3	1	1	6	3	Squad	5	1	3	1	4	2
(Costa Rica) (Jamaica) (United States) 2019	Quarter-finals	5th	4	2	1	1	8	4	Squad	Qualified automatically					
(United States) 2021	Quarter-finals	5th	4	3	0	1	6	4	Squad	4	1	3	0	4	3
(Canada) (United States) 2023	Quarter-finals	7th	4	1	1	2	7	8	Squad	4	2	0	2	4	4
(Canada) (United States) 2025	Quarter-finals	7th	4	2	2	0	8	6	Squad	8	4	3	1	22	5
2027	To be determined									To be determined					
Total	3 Titles	23/28	108	47	31	30	175	115	—	90	42	31	17	147	69

CONCACAF Championship & Gold Cup history
First match	Costa Rica 6–0 Jamaica (24 March 1963; Santa Ana, El Salvador)
Biggest win	Costa Rica 6–0 Jamaica (24 March 1963; Santa Ana, El Salvador); Costa Rica 6–0 Netherlands Antilles (28 March 1965; Guatemala City, Guatemala)
Biggest defeat	Mexico 4–1 Costa Rica (12 June 2011; Chicago, United States)
Best result	Champions (1963, 1969, 1989)
Worst result	Quarter-finals (2007, 2015, 2023, 2025)

=== CONCACAF Nations League ===
CONCACAF Nations League record
League phase / Quarter-finals										Finals								
Season	Division	Group	Pld	W	D	L	GF	GA	P/R	Year	Result	Pld	W	D	L	GF	GA	Squad
2019−20	A	D	4	1	3	0	4	3	Same position	(United States) 2021	Fourth place	2	0	2	0	2	0	Squad
2022–23	A	B	4	2	0	2	4	4	Same position	(United States) 2023	Did not qualify							
2023–24	A	Bye							Same position	(United States) 2024	Did not qualify							
2024–25	A	A	6	2	3	1	9	4	Same position	(United States) 2025	Did not qualify							
2026–27	A	A	4	2	0	2	8	6	Same position	(United States) 2027	Did not qualify							
Total	—	—	18	7	6	5	25	17	—	Total	0 Titles	2	0	2	0	2	0	—

CONCACAF Nations League history
First match	Haiti 1–1 Costa Rica (10 October 2019; Nassau, Bahamas)
Biggest win	Costa Rica 3–0 Guadeloupe (5 September 2024; San José, Costa Rica); Costa Rica 3–0 Guatemala (15 October 2024; San José, Costa Rica); Nicaragua 0–3 Costa Rica (1 October 2026; Managua, Nicaragua)
Biggest defeat	Costa Rica 0–3 Panama (16 November 2023; San José, Costa Rica)
Best result	Fourth place (2019–20)
Worst result	Eighth place (2023–24)

=== Copa América ===
Copa América record
Year	Round	Position	Pld	W	D	L	GF	GA	Squad
(Bolivia) 1997	Group stage	10th	3	0	1	2	2	10	Squad
(Colombia) 2001	Quarter-finals	5th	4	2	1	1	7	3	Squad
(Peru) 2004	Quarter-finals	7th	4	1	0	3	3	8	Squad
(Argentina) 2011	Group stage	9th	3	1	0	2	2	4	Squad
(United States) 2016	Group stage	10th	3	1	1	1	3	6	Squad
(United States) 2024	Group stage	10th	3	1	1	1	2	4	Squad
Total	Quarter-finals	6/6	20	6	4	10	19	35	—

Copa América history
First match	Brazil 5–0 Costa Rica (13 June 1997; Santa Cruz, Paraguay)
Biggest win	Bolivia 0–4 Costa Rica (19 June 2001; Medellín, Colombia)
Biggest defeat	Brazil 5–0 Costa Rica (13 June 1997; Santa Cruz, Paraguay)
Best result	Quarter-finals (2001, 2004)
Worst result	10th – Group stage (1997, 2016, 2024)

=== Copa Centroamericana ===
Copa Centroamericana record
Year	Round	Position	Pld	W	D	L	GF	GA
(Costa Rica) 1991	Champions	1st	3	3	0	0	10	1
(Honduras) 1993	Runners-up	2nd	3	2	0	1	3	2
(El Salvador) 1995	Fourth place	4th	4	1	1	2	5	6
(Guatemala) 1997	Champions	1st	5	3	2	0	12	3
(Costa Rica) 1999	Champions	1st	5	3	0	2	13	3
(Honduras) 2001	Runners-up	2nd	5	2	2	1	8	5
(Panama) 2003	Champions	1st	5	4	1	0	5	1
(Guatemala) 2005	Champions	1st	4	3	1	0	8	2
(El Salvador) 2007	Champions	1st	4	2	1	1	5	2
(Honduras) 2009	Runners-up	2nd	4	3	1	0	9	1
(Panama) 2011	Runners-up	2nd	4	1	2	1	6	5
(Costa Rica) 2013	Champions	1st	5	4	1	0	6	1
(United States) 2014	Champions	1st	3	2	1	0	7	3
(Panama) 2017	Fourth place	4th	5	1	3	1	4	2
Total	8 Titles	14/14	59	34	16	9	103	37

=== CCCF Championship ===
CCCF Championship record
Year	Round	Position	Pld	W	D	L	GF	GA
(Costa Rica) 1941	Champions	1st	4	4	0	0	23	5
(El Salvador) 1943	Third place	3rd	6	3	0	3	20	15
(Costa Rica) 1946	Champions	1st	5	4	0	1	24	6
(Guatemala) 1948	Champions	1st	8	5	1	2	25	11
(Panama) 1951	Runners-up	2nd	4	2	1	1	13	5
(Costa Rica) 1953	Champions	1st	6	6	0	0	19	2
(Honduras) 1955	Champions	1st	6	6	0	0	19	4
(Netherlands Antilles) 1957	Withdrew							
(Cuba) 1960	Champions	1st	5	3	2	0	14	4
(Costa Rica) 1961	Champions	1st	7	7	0	0	32	4
Total	7 Titles	9/10	51	40	4	7	191	56

=== Olympic Games ===
Olympic Games record
Year	Round	Position	Pld	W	D	L	GF	GA	Squad
(France) 1900	Only club teams participated								
(United States) 1904	Only club teams participated								
(United Kingdom) 1908	No national representative								
(Sweden) 1912	No national representative								
(Belgium) 1920	No national representative								
(France) 1924	Not an IOC member								
(Netherlands) 1928	Not an IOC member								
(Nazi Germany) 1936	Did not participate								
(United Kingdom) 1948	Did not participate								
(Finland) 1952	Did not participate								
(Australia) 1956	Did not participate								
(Italy) 1960	Did not participate								
(Japan) 1964	Did not participate								
(Mexico) 1968	Did not qualify								
(West Germany) 1972	Did not qualify								
(Canada) 1976	Did not qualify								
(Soviet Union) 1980	Group stage	16th	3	0	0	3	2	9	Squad
(United States) 1984	Group stage	13th	3	1	0	2	2	7	Squad
(South Korea) 1988	Did not qualify								
Since 1992	See Costa Rica national under-23 football team								
Total	Quarter-finals	2/12	6	1	0	5	4	16	—

=== Pan American Games ===
Pan American Games record
Year	Round	Position	Pld	W	D	L	GF	GA
(Argentina) 1951	Silver medal	2nd	4	2	1	1	9	12
(Mexico) 1955	Did not participate							
(United States) 1959	Round-robin	5th	6	2	1	3	10	16
(Brazil) 1963	Did not participate							
(Canada) 1967	Did not participate							
(Colombia) 1971	Did not participate							
(Mexico) 1975	Fourth place	4th	6	2	1	3	7	13
(Puerto Rico) 1979	Fourth place	4th	5	2	0	3	8	7
(Venezuela) 1983	Did not participate							
(United States) 1987	Did not participate							
(Cuba) 1991	Did not participate							
(Argentina) 1995	Quarter-finals	6th	4	2	0	2	12	6
Since 1999	See Costa Rica national under-23 football team							
Total	Silver medal	5/12	25	10	3	12	46	54

=== Panamerican Championship ===
Panamerican Championship record
Year	Round	Position	Pld	W	D	L	GF	GA
(Chile) 1952	Did not qualify							
(Mexico) 1956	Third place	3rd	5	2	1	2	11	15
(Costa Rica) 1960	Fourth place	4th	6	1	2	3	4	10
Total	Third place	2/3	11	3	3	5	15	25

== Head-to-head record ==
The following table shows Costa Rica's all-time international record, correct as of 4 October 2026.

Positive Record Neutral Record Negative Record

Team	M	W	D	L	GF	GA	GD
Argentina	8	0	2	6	6	22	–16
Aruba	2	1	1	0	4	3	1
Australia	1	0	0	1	0	1	–1
Austria	2	0	1	1	2	4	–2
Barbados	2	1	0	1	4	2	2
Bahamas	1	1	0	0	8	0	8
Belgium	2	0	0	2	1	5	–4
Belize	8	8	0	0	31	2	29
Bermuda	1	1	0	0	2	1	1
Bolivia	3	2	1	0	7	1	6
Bosnia and Herzegovina	1	0	1	0	0	0	0
Brazil	12	1	1	10	9	34	–25
Cameroon	1	1	0	0	5	0	5
Canada	24	9	9	6	22	18	4
Chile	11	6	2	3	13	10	3
China	5	2	2	1	8	6	2
Colombia	16	4	1	11	18	33	–15
Cuba	18	15	3	0	57	11	46
Curaçao	3	1	1	1	6	6	0
Czech Republic (Note: include Czechoslovakia)	2	0	0	2	1	5	–5
Dominican Republic	3	3	0	0	10	2	8
Ecuador	12	1	5	6	10	22	–12
El Salvador	69	40	15	14	151	58	93
England	3	0	1	2	0	5	–5
Finland	1	1	0	0	2	1	1
France	2	0	0	2	3	5	–2
French Guiana	1	1	0	0	3	0	3
Germany	2	0	0	2	4	8	–4
Greece	1	0	1	0	1	1	0
Grenada	3	2	1	0	8	2	6
Guadeloupe	4	4	0	0	12	2	10
Guatemala	66	33	16	17	135	72	63
Guyana	2	2	0	0	11	0	11
Haiti	19	9	6	4	33	16	17
Honduras	71	26	26	19	114	84	30
Hungary	1	0	0	1	0	1	–1
Iran	3	0	1	2	2	8	–6
Italy	2	1	0	1	1	1	0
Jamaica	31	15	11	4	56	19	37
Japan	6	1	1	4	4	13	–9
Jordan	1	0	1	0	2	2	0
Martinique	5	5	0	0	15	6	9
Mexico	59	6	21	32	34	88	–54
Netherlands	1	0	1	0	0	0	0
New Zealand	3	3	0	0	6	0	6
Nicaragua	22	19	2	1	80	12	68
Nigeria	1	1	0	0	2	0	2
Northern Ireland	1	1	0	0	3	0	3
Norway	2	0	1	1	0	1	–1
Oman	1	1	0	0	4	3	1
Panama	64	29	16	19	122	63	59
Paraguay	10	4	3	3	7	7	0
Peru	9	2	1	6	10	18	–8
Poland	3	0	0	3	3	8	–5
Puerto Rico	1	1	0	0	13	0	13
Qatar	1	0	1	0	1	1	0
Republic of Ireland	1	0	1	0	1	1	0
Russia (Note: include Soviet Union)	2	1	0	1	5	5	0
Saint Kitts and Nevis	1	1	0	0	4	0	4
Saudi Arabia	5	4	0	1	12	6	6
Scotland	2	2	0	0	2	0	2
Serbia	1	0	0	1	0	1	–1
Slovakia	3	1	1	1	6	5	1
South Africa	2	0	0	2	1	3	–2
South Korea	11	3	3	5	12	14	–2
Spain	4	0	1	3	3	16	–13
Saint Vincent and the Grenadines	3	3	0	0	13	1	12
Suriname	8	7	1	0	24	8	16
Sweden	2	1	0	1	2	2	0
Switzerland	3	1	1	1	3	4	–1
Trinidad and Tobago	27	20	4	3	61	16	45
Tunisia	1	0	0	1	0	1	–1
Turkey	1	0	1	0	1	1	0
Ukraine	1	0	0	1	0	4	–4
Uruguay	15	3	4	8	19	26	–7
United Arab Emirates	1	0	0	1	1	4	–3
United States	42	17	5	20	49	52	–3
Uzbekistan	1	1	0	0	2	1	1
Venezuela	16	7	5	4	28	24	4
Wales	2	1	0	1	1	1	0
Total (79)	761	216	142	241	1,316	877	+439

== Honours ==
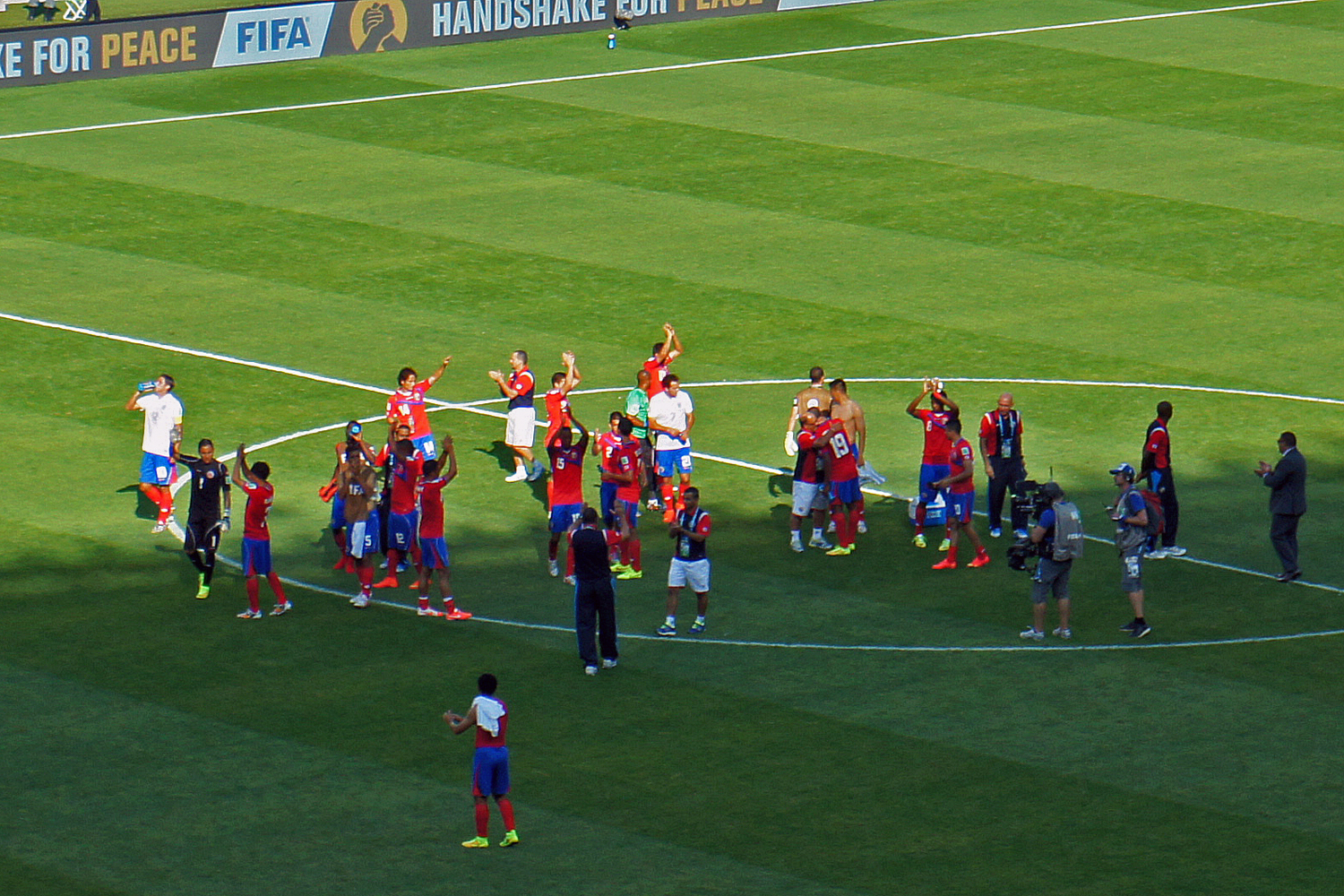
Costa Rica national football team players celebrating their classification at the FIFA World Cup 2014 for the round of 16 in first place of Group D at Mineirão stadium in Belo Horizonte after their draw with England.

=== Intercontinental ===
- Panamerican Championship (Note: Competition organized by PFC, the former intercontinental and unified confederation of the Americas (1946–1961), which was formed by NAFC, CCCF and CONMEBOL.)
  - (bronze) Third place (1): 1956

=== Continental ===
- CONCACAF Championship / Gold Cup
  - Champions (3): 1963, 1969, 1989
  - (silver) Runners-up (1): 2002
  - (bronze) Third place (4): 1965, 1971, 1985, 1993

=== Subcontinental / Regional ===
- CCCF Championship (Note: Competition organized by CCCF, the former subcontinental confederation affiliated with FIFA as the governing body for football in Central America and Caribbean (1938–1961), and a direct predecessor of CONCACAF.)
  - (gold) Champions (7): 1941, 1946, 1948, 1953, 1955, 1960, 1961
  - (silver) Runners-up (1): 1951
  - (bronze) Third place (1): 1943
- Copa de Naciones UNCAF / Copa Centroamericana
  - (gold) Champions (8): 1991, 1997, 1999, 2003, 2005, 2007, 2013, 2014
  - (silver) Runners-up (4): 1993, 2001, 2009, 2011
- Central American and Caribbean Games
  - (silver) Silver medal (3): 1930, 1935, 1938

=== Friendly / Unofficial ===
- Independence Centenary Games (1): 1921
- Copa Centroamérica-Independencia (1): 2006

=== Summary ===
Honours in competitions directly organized or recognized by FIFA or an affiliated confederation.

Competition	1st place, gold medalist(s)	2nd place, silver medalist(s)	3rd place, bronze medalist(s)	Total
CONCACAF Championship / Gold Cup	3	1	4	8
Panamerican Championship	0	0	1	1
CCCF Championship	7	1	1	9
Total	10	2	6	18

== FIFA World Ranking ==
Last update was on 27 May 2021 Source:

Best Ranking Worst Ranking Best Mover Worst Mover

Costa Rica's FIFA World Ranking History
Rank	Year	Best		Worst	
Rank	Year	Rank	Move	Rank	Move
50	2021	—	—	—	—
51	2020	46	Steady	51	▼4
46	2019	37	▲1	47	▼5
36	2018	23	▲2	37	▼9
26	2017	17	▲5	26	▼7
17	2016	17	▲8	37	▼4
37	2015	13	▲3	42	▼27
16	2014	15	▲12	35	▼3
31	2013	31	▲16	66	▼3
66	2012	57	▲8	72	▼6
65	2011	48	▲21	69	▼5
69	2010	40	▲3	69	▼13
44	2009	30	▲11	47	▼8
53	2008	53	▲12	79	▼4
70	2007	46	▲12	70	▼10
68	2006	21	Steady	68	▼19
21	2005	19	▲6	27	▼3
27	2004	17	▲5	33	▼5
17	2003	17	▲3	22	▼2
21	2002	21	▲5	30	▼2
30	2001	29	▲14	56	▼2
60	2000	54	▲8	69	▼5
64	1999	64	▲5	69	▼2
67	1998	46	▲7	67	▼15
51	1997	51	▲9	66	▼2
72	1996	72	▲12	93	▼6
78	1995	56	▲18	78	▼13
65	1994	39	▲3	65	▼9
42	1993	37	▲1	42	▼5

== See also ==
- Costa Rica national under-23 football team
- Costa Rica national under-20 football team
- Costa Rica national under-17 football team
- Costa Rica at the FIFA World Cup
