= Dayron Sánchez =

Costa Rican footballer (born 2000)

Personal information
- Full name: Dayron Miguel Sánchez Briceño
- Date of birth: 29 September 2000 (age 26)
- Place of birth: Nicoya, Costa Rica
- Position: Midfielder

Team information
- Current team: Inter de San Carlos
- Number: 8

Youth career
- Herediano

Senior career*
Years	Team	Apps	(Gls)
2017–2020	Herediano	1	(0)
2019	→ La U Universitarios (loan)	0	(0)
2020–2023	Guanacasteca		
2023	→ Municipal Liberia (loan)		
2024	Jicaral		
2024–	Inter de San Carlos		
- * Club domestic league appearances and goals as of 11:36, 10 December 2020 (UTC)

Dayron Miguel Sánchez Briceño (born 29 September 2000) is a Costa Rican footballer who plays as a midfielder for Inter de San Carlos.

== Club career ==
=== Herediano ===
Sánchez is a product of C.S. Herediano. On 17 December 2017, 17-year old Sánchez got his official debut for Herediano against Pérez Zeledón in the Liga FPD, when he came in as a substitute for William Quirós in the halftime.

Sánchez did not play for the first team of Herediano again and therefore, he was loaned out to La U Universitarios in the summer 2019. However, he wasn't able to break through there neither and therefore, he left the club again at the end of 2019, without making his debut.

=== AD Guanacasteca ===
On 6 January 2020 AD Guanacasteca confirmed, that Sánchez had joined the club.

In January 2023, Sánchez moved on a six-months loan deal to A.D. Municipal Liberia. After returning from his loan spell, AD Guanacasteca announced that Sánchez would no longer be a part of the club ahead of the new season.

=== ADR Jicaral ===
In January 2024, Sánchez signed with A.D.R. Jicaral.

=== Inter de San Carlos ===
In the summer 2024, Sánchez moved to Inter de San Carlos.
