= Carlos Montenegro (footballer) =

Nicaraguan footballer (born 1991)

Personal information
- Full name: Carlos Adriel Montenegro Rodríguez
- Date of birth: 7 January 1991 (age 35)
- Place of birth: Heredia, Costa Rica
- Height: 1.81 m (5 ft 11 in)
- Position: Centre back

Team information
- Current team: Cartaginés

Senior career*
Years	Team	Apps	(Gls)
2012–2019	Carmelita	106	(9)
2019–2020	Universitarios	12	(1)
2020–	Cartaginés	9	(0)

International career^{‡}
2019–	Nicaragua	3	(0)
- * Club domestic league appearances and goals as of 14:14, 7 April 2021 (UTC) ‡ National team caps and goals as of 14:14, 7 April 2021 (UTC)

Carlos Adriel Montenegro Rodríguez (born 7 January 1991) is a professional footballer who plays as a centre back for Cartaginés. Born in Costa Rica, he plays for the Nicaragua national team.

== International career ==
Montenegro was born in Costa Rica to a Costa Rican father and a Nicaraguan mother. He made his senior debut for Nicaragua on 7 June 2019, starting in a friendly match against Argentina before being substituted at half time.
