= Antonio Moyano (footballer, born 1928) =

Spanish association football player

Personal information
- Full name: Antonio Moyano Reina
- Date of birth: 1 March 1928
- Place of birth: Spain
- Date of death: 9 March 2010 (aged 82)
- Place of death: Costa Rica
- Position: Midfielder

Antonio Moyano Reina (1 March 1928 - 9 March 2010) was a Spanish football manager and former footballer who last managed the Costa Rica national football team.

== Early life ==
Moyano was born in 1928 in Puente Genil, Spain.

== Playing career ==
Moyano played professional football in Spain.

== Managerial career ==
Moyano arrived in Costa Rica in 1972. He managed Costa Rican side Herediano, helping the club win the league. In 1980, he was appointed manager of the Costa Rica national football team, helping them qualify for the 1980 Summer Olympics.

== Personal life ==
Moyano had eleven siblings. He was the son of a doctor.
