= 1946 CCCF Championship squads =

These are the squads for the countries that played in the 1946 CCCF Championship.

The age listed for each player is on 23 February 1946, the first day of the tournament. The numbers of caps and goals listed for each player do not include any matches played after the start of the tournament. The club listed is the club for which the player last played a competitive match before the tournament. The nationality for each club reflects the national association (not the league) to which the club is affiliated. A flag is included for coaches who are of a different nationality than their own national team.

== Costa Rica ==
Head coach: Hernán Bolaños

No.	Pos.	Player	Date of birth (age)	Caps	Goals	Club
1	GK	Jorge Rodríguez	1926 (aged 19-20)	0	0	(Costa Rican Football Federation) Herediano
2	GK	José Alberto Torres		0	0	(Costa Rican Football Federation) Orión
3	DF	Edgar Silva	30 September 1923 (aged 22)	0	0	(Costa Rican Football Federation) Orión
4	DF	Isaac Jiménez	19 May 1918 (aged 27)	0	0	(Costa Rican Football Federation) La Libertad
5	DF	Mario Masís		0	0	(Costa Rican Football Federation) Orión
6	MF	Ignacio García		0	0	(Costa Rican Football Federation) Orión
7	MF	Eduardo Cabalceta		6	0	(Costa Rican Football Federation) UCR
7	MF	Elías Valenciano	4 April 1925 (aged 20)	0	0	(Costa Rican Football Federation) Orión
8	MF	Jorge Eduardo Umaña		0	0	(Costa Rican Football Federation) UCR
9	MF	Álvaro Villalobos		0	0	(Costa Rican Football Federation) Alajuelense
10	MF	Édgar Esquivel	25 February 1925 (aged 20)	0	0	(Costa Rican Football Federation) UCR
11	FW	Walker Rodríguez		4	2	(Costa Rican Football Federation) Orión
12	FW	Mario Riggioni		5	2	(Costa Rican Football Federation) Alajuelense
13	FW	Aníbal Varela	12 January 1912 (aged 34)	9	3	(Costa Rican Football Federation) Herediano
14	FW	Fernando Solano		0	0	(Costa Rican Football Federation) UCR
15	FW	Luis Zamora		0	0	(Costa Rican Football Federation) Gimnástica Española
16	FW	José Luis Rojas	18 May 1921 (aged 22)	7	1	(Costa Rican Football Federation) Alajuelense
17	FW	Édgar Murillo	6 September 1920 (aged 25)	0	0	(Costa Rican Football Federation) Herediano
18	FW	José Manuel Retana		0	0	(Costa Rican Football Federation) Alajuelense
19	FW	José Francisco Zeledón		6	9	(Costa Rican Football Federation) Orión

== El Salvador ==
Head coach: Américo González

No.	Pos.	Player	Date of birth (age)	Caps	Goals	Club
1	GK	Manuel Gómez		0	0	(Salvadoran Football Federation)
2	GK	Mejía		0	0	(Salvadoran Football Federation)
3	DF	Rafael “Chapuda” Reyes		2	0	(Salvadoran Football Federation) Juventud Olímpica
4	DF	Freddy Maida		1	0	(Salvadoran Football Federation) Juventud Olímpica
5	DF	Efraín Rodríguez		6	0	(Salvadoran Football Federation)
6	DF	Gonzalo Palacios		0	0	(Salvadoran Football Federation)
7	DF	José Manuel Deras		0	0	(Salvadoran Football Federation)
8	MF	Luis Antonio Regalado	1 October 1922 (aged 23)	6	1	(Salvadoran Football Federation) Luis Ángel Firpo
9	MF	Julián Linares		1	0	(Salvadoran Football Federation) Juventud Olímpica
10	MF	René Cea		0	0	(Salvadoran Football Federation)
11	MF	Miguel Rivas		4	5	(Salvadoran Football Federation)
12	MF	Luis Gutiérrez		0	0	(Salvadoran Football Federation)
13	FW	Ricardo Monterrosa		4	2	(Salvadoran Football Federation)
14	FW	Rafael Julio Corado		6	3	(Salvadoran Football Federation)
15	FW	Héctor Canales		0	0	(Salvadoran Football Federation)
16	FW	René Gutiérrez		4	3	(Salvadoran Football Federation) Juventud Olímpica
17	FW	Juan Cubias		1	0	(Salvadoran Football Federation)
18	FW	Luis Alonso Torres		6	3	(Salvadoran Football Federation)
19	FW	Luis Ruano		0	0	(Salvadoran Football Federation)

== Guatemala ==
Head coach: Juan Francisco Aguirre

No.	Pos.	Player	Date of birth (age)	Caps	Goals	Club
1	GK	Salomón Fuentes		3	0	(National Football Federation of Guatemala) Tipografía Nacional
2	GK	Héctor Samoya		3	0	(National Football Federation of Guatemala) Hércules
3	DF	Federico Augusto Morales		0	0	(National Football Federation of Guatemala) Municipal
4	DF	Guillermo Humberto Lobos		0	0	(National Football Federation of Guatemala) Municipal
5	DF	José Álvaro Mirón		0	0	(National Football Federation of Guatemala) Municipal
6	DF	Jorge "Chojojo" Durán		4	0	(National Football Federation of Guatemala)
7	MF	Guillermo Marroquín		4	0	(National Football Federation of Guatemala) Municipal
8	MF	Alfredo Castellanos		4	0	(National Football Federation of Guatemala)
9	MF	Joaquín Ortiz Díaz		5	0	(National Football Federation of Guatemala)
10	MF	Carlos Enrique Rodas		0	0	(National Football Federation of Guatemala)
11	MF	Jorge Baham		0	0	(National Football Federation of Guatemala)
12	FW	Pepino Toledo	10 August 1919 (aged 26)	5	7	(National Football Federation of Guatemala) Municipal
13	FW	Mario Camposeco	6 August 1921 (aged 24)	5	1	(National Football Federation of Guatemala) Xelajú
14	FW	Esteban “Ñeco” González		3	0	(National Football Federation of Guatemala) Municipal
15	FW	Julio Armando Durán		0	0	(National Football Federation of Guatemala) Municipal
16	FW	Efraín de León		0	0	(National Football Federation of Guatemala) Municipal
17	FW	Julio Díaz		0	0	(National Football Federation of Guatemala)
18	FW	José Luis Ortega		0	0	(National Football Federation of Guatemala)
19	FW	Valentín del Cid		4	2	(National Football Federation of Guatemala)
20	FW	Raúl Vandernber		0	0	(National Football Federation of Guatemala)

== Honduras ==
Head Coach: István Kovács

No.	Pos.	Player	Date of birth (age)	Caps	Goals	Club
	GK	Clive Garbutt		0	0	(National Autonomous Federation of Football of Honduras) Aduana Deportivo
	GK	Héctor Baiza		0	0	(National Autonomous Federation of Football of Honduras) Victoria
	GK	Constantino Bandy Cury		0	0	(National Autonomous Federation of Football of Honduras)
	DF	Armando Sosa		0	0	(National Autonomous Federation of Football of Honduras) Aduana Deportivo
	DF	Raúl Graugnard		0	0	(National Autonomous Federation of Football of Honduras)
	DF	Quintín Máximo		0	0	(National Autonomous Federation of Football of Honduras)
	MF	Antonio Villatoro		0	0	(National Autonomous Federation of Football of Honduras) Aduana Deportivo
	MF	Francisco Arguijo		0	0	(National Autonomous Federation of Football of Honduras) Aduana Deportivo
	FW	Raúl Barahona		0	0	(National Autonomous Federation of Football of Honduras) Aduana Deportivo
	FW	Zacarías Arzu		0	0	(National Autonomous Federation of Football of Honduras)
		Ladislao Mendoza		0	0	(National Autonomous Federation of Football of Honduras) Aduana Deportivo
		Napoleón Hidalgo		0	0	(National Autonomous Federation of Football of Honduras) Aduana Deportivo
		Alfonso Fajardo		0	0	(National Autonomous Federation of Football of Honduras)
		Francisco Fortín		0	0	(National Autonomous Federation of Football of Honduras)
		Trinidad Palencia		0	0	(National Autonomous Federation of Football of Honduras)
		Marciano Montoya		0	0	(National Autonomous Federation of Football of Honduras)
		Alfonso González		0	0	(National Autonomous Federation of Football of Honduras)
		Elías Hilsaca		0	0	(National Autonomous Federation of Football of Honduras)
		Armando Doblado		0	0	(National Autonomous Federation of Football of Honduras)
		Ernesto López		0	0	(National Autonomous Federation of Football of Honduras)
		Apolonio Rivera		0	0	(National Autonomous Federation of Football of Honduras)

== Nicaragua ==
Head coach: Eduardo Kosovic

No.	Pos.	Player	Date of birth (age)	Caps	Goals	Club
1	GK	Erasmo Solórzano		5	0	(Nicaraguan Football Federation)
2	GK	Salvador Huerda		1	0	(Nicaraguan Football Federation)
3	DF	Carlos Morales		5	0	(Nicaraguan Football Federation)
4	DF	Elías Robleto		0	0	(Nicaraguan Football Federation) Diriangén
5	DF	Manuel Matus Zúñiga		1	0	(Nicaraguan Football Federation)
6	DF	César González		0	0	(Nicaraguan Football Federation)
7	MF	Enrique Bejarano		0	0	(Nicaraguan Football Federation)
8	MF	Juan José Sandoval		0	0	(Nicaraguan Football Federation)
9	MF	Guillermo Morales		9	1	(Nicaraguan Football Federation)
10	MF	Rodolfo Fajardo		3	0	(Nicaraguan Football Federation)
11	MF	Juan Robleto		1	0	(Nicaraguan Football Federation) Diriangén
12	FW	Pedro Robleto		6	1	(Nicaraguan Football Federation) Diriangén
13	MF	Eugenio Leyton		0	0	(Nicaraguan Football Federation)
14	FW	Efraín Arroligo		6	0	(Nicaraguan Football Federation)
15	FW	Rodolfo Navarro		4	0	(Nicaraguan Football Federation)
16	FW	Francisco Navarro		5	1	(Nicaraguan Football Federation)
17	FW	Francisco Pérez		0	0	(Nicaraguan Football Federation)
18	FW	Roberto Solórzano		0	0	(Nicaraguan Football Federation)
19	FW	Wilfredo Estrada		0	0	(Nicaraguan Football Federation)
20	FW	Guillermo Síndigo		0	0	(Nicaraguan Football Federation)

== Panama ==
Head coach: Emel Espino

No.	Pos.	Player	Date of birth (age)	Caps	Goals	Club
1	GK	Pedro Pablo Arozemena		0	0	(Panamanian Football Federation) Pacífico
2	GK	Gerardo Federico Warren		0	0	(Panamanian Football Federation)
3	DF	Félix Tejada		3	0	(Panamanian Football Federation) Avión
4	DF	Manuel Figueroa		0	0	(Panamanian Football Federation) Pacífico
5	DF	Carlos A. Louis		0	0	(Panamanian Football Federation) Libertad
6	DF	Gabriel Ospino		0	0	(Panamanian Football Federation) San Francisco
7	DF	Reinaldo Antonio Carrillo		0	0	(Panamanian Football Federation) Libertad
8	DF	Antonio Latiff		0	0	(Panamanian Football Federation)
9	MF	Alfredo Sandiford		0	0	(Panamanian Football Federation) América
10	MF	José Eduardo Pinnock		0	0	(Panamanian Football Federation) Libertad
11	MF	Alberto Jiménez		0	0	(Panamanian Football Federation) Ancón
12	MF	Carlos Martínez		0	0	(Panamanian Football Federation) Estrellas
13	FW	Juan Ferreira		0	0	(Panamanian Football Federation) Deportivo Colón
14	FW	Luis Carlos Rangel		4	6	(Panamanian Football Federation) Deportivo Colón
15	FW	Antonio Morales		2	1	(Panamanian Football Federation) Celen
16	FW	Luis Carlos Valdés		0	0	(Panamanian Football Federation) Deportivo 19
17	FW	Gilberto Chanis		0	0	(Panamanian Football Federation) Pacífico
18	FW	José de la Cruz Campos		0	0	(Panamanian Football Federation)
19	FW	Efraín Rosas		0	0	(Panamanian Football Federation)
