= 1951 CCCF Championship squads =

These are the squads for the countries that played in the 1951 CCCF Championship.

The age listed for each player is on 25 February 1951, the first day of the tournament. The numbers of caps and goals listed for each player do not include any matches played after the start of the tournament. The club listed is the club for which the player last played a competitive match before the tournament. The nationality for each club reflects the national association (not the league) to which the club is affiliated. A flag is included for coaches who are of a different nationality than their own national team.

== Costa Rica ==
Head coach: Ismael Quesada

No.	Pos.	Player	Date of birth (age)	Caps	Goals	Club
1	GK	Amado Calvo		0	0	(Costa Rican Football Federation) Herediano
2	GK	René Muñoz		0	0	(Costa Rican Football Federation) Orión
3	DF	Luis Ángel Umaña	10 June 1924 (aged 26)	0	0	(Costa Rican Football Federation) Orión
4	DF	Edgar Silva	1923 (aged 27–28)	1	0	(Costa Rican Football Federation) Orión
5	DF	Heriberto Molina		0	0	(Costa Rican Football Federation) Alajuelense
6	DF	Claudio Sáenz		0	0	(Costa Rican Football Federation) Herediano
7	MF	Edgar Quesada	16 August 1931 (aged 19)	0	0	(Costa Rican Football Federation) Herediano
8	MF	Mario Ruiz	16 June 1912 (aged 38)	5	0	(Costa Rican Football Federation) UCR
9	MF	Mario Garita		0	0	(Costa Rican Football Federation) Uruguay de Coronado
10	MF	Marco Antonio Ovares		0	0	(Costa Rican Football Federation) Herediano
11	MF	Horacio Rojas		0	0	(Costa Rican Football Federation) Alajuelense
12	FW	Rafael Luis Rodríguez		0	0	(Costa Rican Football Federation) Uruguay de Coronado
13	FW	Omar Sánchez		0	0	(Costa Rican Football Federation) Herediano
14	FW	José J. Meléndez		0	0	(Costa Rican Football Federation) Gimnástica Española
15	FW	Aníbal Varela	12 January 1912 (aged 39)	11	3	(Costa Rican Football Federation) Herediano
16	FW	José Rafael Meza	6 July 1920 (aged 30)	3	8	(Costa Rican Football Federation) Cartaginés
17	FW	Edgar Alvarado	19 December 1927 (aged 23)	0	0	(Costa Rican Football Federation) Alajuelense
18	FW	Wedell Jiménez	1926 (aged 25)	0	0	(Costa Rican Football Federation) La Libertad
19	FW	Rodrigo Carmona		0	0	(Costa Rican Football Federation) Herediano
20	FW	Eladio Esquivel	15 March 1926 (aged 24)	4	2	(Costa Rican Football Federation) Herediano
21	FW	Jaime Meza	6 January 1926 (aged 25)	8	11	(Costa Rican Football Federation) Herediano
22	FW	Eduardo Meléndez		0	0	(Costa Rican Football Federation) Uruguay de Coronado

== Nicaragua ==
Head coach: Gilberto Bermúdez

No.	Pos.	Player	Date of birth (age)	Caps	Goals	Club
	GK	Wilfredo Gaitán		0	0	(Nicaraguan Football Federation)
	GK	Antonio Somarriba		0	0	(Nicaraguan Football Federation)
	GK	Arnulfo Robleto		0	0	(Nicaraguan Football Federation)
	DF	Rosendo Díaz		0	0	(Nicaraguan Football Federation)
	MF	Francisco Pérez		0	0	(Nicaraguan Football Federation)
	MF	Alberto Olivares		0	0	(Nicaraguan Football Federation)
	MF	Ernesto Mendoza		0	0	(Nicaraguan Football Federation)
	FW	Napoleón Molina		0	0	(Nicaraguan Football Federation)
	FW	Luis Cifuentes		0	0	(Nicaraguan Football Federation)
	FW	Edgar A. Morales		0	0	(Nicaraguan Football Federation)
	MF	Horacio Cordero		0	0	(Nicaraguan Football Federation)
	MF	Raúl Subarrio		0	0	(Nicaraguan Football Federation)
	FW	José María Falla		0	0	(Nicaraguan Football Federation)
	FW	Efraín Arroliga		2	1	(Nicaraguan Football Federation)
	FW	Rodolfo Navarro		6	0	(Nicaraguan Football Federation)
		Jorge Evertz		0	0	(Nicaraguan Football Federation)
		Hernaldo Santos		0	0	(Nicaraguan Football Federation)
		Cristóbal López		0	0	(Nicaraguan Football Federation)
		Francisco Ortega		0	0	(Nicaraguan Football Federation)
		Arontes Argüello		0	0	(Nicaraguan Football Federation)
		Carlos Navarro		0	0	(Nicaraguan Football Federation)
		Alberto Dávila		0	0	(Nicaraguan Football Federation)
		Edmundo Bojorge		0	0	(Nicaraguan Football Federation)

== Panama ==
Head coach: Óscar Rendoll Gómez

No.	Pos.	Player	Date of birth (age)	Caps	Goals	Club
	GK	Gerardo Federico Warren		7	0	(Panamanian Football Federation) Hispano
	GK	Everardo Lasso		0	0	(Panamanian Football Federation) Ancón
	DF	Félix Tejada		13	1	(Panamanian Football Federation) Ancón
	DF	Gastón de León		0	0	(Panamanian Football Federation) Ibérico
	DF	César Rodríguez		0	0	(Panamanian Football Federation) Pacífico
	DF	Reinaldo Antonio Carrillo		10	0	(Panamanian Football Federation) Hispano
	DF	Carlos Lanús Pérez		0	0	(Panamanian Football Federation) Ibérico
	DF	Antonio Latiff		9	0	(Panamanian Football Federation) Colón
	MF	Alfredo Sandiford		7	0	(Panamanian Football Federation) Hispano
	MF	Miguel Ángel Gascón		0	0	(Panamanian Football Federation) Ibérico
	FW	José Eduardo Pinnock		5	1	(Panamanian Football Federation) Pacífico
	FW	Luis Carlos Ponce	22 August 1932 (aged 18)	0	0	(Panamanian Football Federation) Ibérico
	FW	Luis Carlos Valdés		6	1	(Panamanian Football Federation) Huracán
	FW	Luis Carlos Lemus		0	0	(Panamanian Football Federation) Huracán
	FW	Horacio Rangel		0	0	(Panamanian Football Federation) Huracán
	FW	José Félix de Bello		2	0	(Panamanian Football Federation) Ibérico
	FW	Luis Carlos Rangel		15	14	(Panamanian Football Federation) Ibérico
	FW	Rafael Arana		0	0	(Panamanian Football Federation) Ibérico
	FW	Roberto Linares		0	0	(Panamanian Football Federation) Amador
	FW	Antonio Carlos Torres		0	0	(Panamanian Football Federation) Ancón
	FW	Antonio Morales		12	6	(Panamanian Football Federation) Colón
	FW	Nelson Castillo		0	0	(Panamanian Football Federation) Colón
