= 1943 CCCF Championship squads =

These are the squads for the countries that played in the 1943 CCCF Championship.

The age listed for each player is on 5 December 1943, the first day of the tournament. The numbers of caps and goals listed for each player do not include any matches played after the start of the tournament. The club listed is the club for which the player last played a competitive match before the tournament. The nationality for each club reflects the national association (not the league) to which the club is affiliated. A flag is included for coaches who are of a different nationality than their own national team.

== Costa Rica ==
Head coach: Alejandro Morera

| No. | Pos. | Player | Date of birth (age) | Caps | Goals | Club |
|---|---|---|---|---|---|---|
| 1 | GK | Eugenio Pignataro | | 0 | 0 | (Costa Rican Football Federation) La Libertad |
| 2 | GK | Rafael Ángel Cardona | | 0 | 0 | (Costa Rican Football Federation) UCR |
| 3 | DF | William Cordero | | 0 | 0 | (Costa Rican Football Federation) Alajuelense |
| 4 | DF | Tomás Alfaro | | 0 | 0 | (Costa Rican Football Federation) UCR |
| 5 | DF | Héctor Cordero | | 0 | 0 | (Costa Rican Football Federation) Alajuelense |
| 6 | MF | Mario Ruiz | 16 June 1912 (aged 31) | 0 | 0 | (Costa Rican Football Federation) La Libertad |
| 7 | MF | Jorge "Lalo" Rojas | 25 March 1918 (aged 25) | 2 | 0 | (Costa Rican Football Federation) Alajuelense |
| 7 | MF | Jorge Eduardo Umaña | | 0 | 0 | (Costa Rican Football Federation) UCR |
| 8 | MF | Eduardo Cabalceta | | 0 | 0 | (Costa Rican Football Federation) La Libertad |
| 9 | MF | César Hernández | | 0 | 0 | (Costa Rican Football Federation) La Libertad |
| 10 | FW | José Luis Rojas | 18 May 1921 (aged 22) | 3 | 0 | (Costa Rican Football Federation) Alajuelense |
| 11 | FW | Alejandro Morera | 14 July 1909 (aged 34) | 0 | 0 | (Costa Rican Football Federation) Alajuelense |
| 12 | FW | Aníbal Varela | 12 January 1912 (aged 31) | 4 | 2 | (Costa Rican Football Federation) Herediano |
| 13 | FW | José Alberto Granados | | 0 | 0 | (Costa Rican Football Federation) Cartaginés |
| 14 | FW | Mario Riggioni | | 0 | 0 | (Costa Rican Football Federation) Alajuelense |
| 16 | FW | José Francisco Zeledón | | 0 | 0 | (Costa Rican Football Federation) La Libertad |
| 17 | FW | Fernando Ruiz | | 0 | 0 | (Costa Rican Football Federation) UCR |
| 18 | FW | Álvaro Rojas | 12 August 1919 (aged 24) | 0 | 0 | (Costa Rican Football Federation) Alajuelense |

== El Salvador ==
Head coach: Américo González

| No. | Pos. | Player | Date of birth (age) | Caps | Goals | Club |
|---|---|---|---|---|---|---|
| 1 | GK | Edmundo Majano | | 3 | 0 | (Salvadoran Football Federation) España |
| 2 | GK | Ricardo Granados | | 0 | 0 | (Salvadoran Football Federation) |
| 3 | DF | Rafael “Chapuda” Reyes | | 0 | 0 | (Salvadoran Football Federation) Juventud Olímpica |
| 4 | DF | Adrián Díaz | | 4 | 0 | (Salvadoran Football Federation) Quequeisque |
| 4 | DF | Efraín Rodríguez | | 0 | 0 | (Salvadoran Football Federation) |
| 6 | DF | Samuel Astacio | | 0 | 0 | (Salvadoran Football Federation) |
| 7 | MF | Julián Linares | | 1 | 0 | (Salvadoran Football Federation) Juventud Olímpica |
| 8 | MF | Luis Antonio Regalado | 1 October 1922 (aged 21) | 0 | 0 | (Salvadoran Football Federation) Luis Ángel Firpo |
| 9 | MF | Miguel Ezequiel Campos | | 4 | 0 | (Salvadoran Football Federation) Quequeisque |
| 10 | MF | Miguel Rivas | | 0 | 0 | (Salvadoran Football Federation) |
| 11 | MF | José Luis Aceituno | | 0 | 0 | (Salvadoran Football Federation) España |
| 12 | FW | Luis Alonso Torres | | 2 | 0 | (Salvadoran Football Federation) Juventud Olímpica |
| 12 | FW | Juan Cubias | | 0 | 0 | (Salvadoran Football Federation) |
| 13 | FW | Luis "Potrillo" Ruano | | 0 | 0 | (Salvadoran Football Federation) |
| 14 | FW | Rafael Julio Corado | | 0 | 0 | (Salvadoran Football Federation) |
| 15 | FW | Miguel José Deras | | 1 | 0 | (Salvadoran Football Federation) Quequeisque |
| 16 | FW | Gustavo Donado | | 3 | 1 | (Salvadoran Football Federation) España |
| 17 | FW | Ricardo Monterrosa | | 0 | 0 | (Salvadoran Football Federation) |
| 18 | FW | Miguel Cruz | 1914 (aged 28–29) | 0 | 0 | (Football Federation of Chile) Universidad Católica |

== Guatemala ==
Head coach: Manuel Felipe Carrera

| No. | Pos. | Player | Date of birth (age) | Caps | Goals | Club |
|---|---|---|---|---|---|---|
| 1 | GK | Héctor Samayoa | | 0 | 0 | (National Football Federation of Guatemala) Hércules |
| 2 | GK | Salomón Fuentes | | 0 | 0 | (National Football Federation of Guatemala) Tipografía Nacional |
| 3 | DF | Eduardo Guzmán | | 0 | 0 | (National Football Federation of Guatemala) Municipal |
| 4 | DF | Jorge "Chojojo" Durán | | 0 | 0 | (National Football Federation of Guatemala) Tipografía Nacional |
| 5 | DF | Gabriel Martínez | | 0 | 0 | (National Football Federation of Guatemala) |
| 6 | MF | Guillermo Marroquín | | 0 | 0 | (National Football Federation of Guatemala) Municipal |
| 7 | MF | Joaquín Ortiz Díaz | | 0 | 0 | (National Football Federation of Guatemala) Tipografía Nacional |
| 8 | MF | Antonio Obregón | | 0 | 0 | (National Football Federation of Guatemala) Municipal |
| 9 | MF | Alfredo Castellanos | | 0 | 0 | (National Football Federation of Guatemala) Municipal |
| 10 | FW | Pepino Toledo | 10 August 1919 (aged 24) | 0 | 0 | (National Football Federation of Guatemala) Municipal |
| 11 | FW | Mario Camposeco | 6 August 1921 (aged 22) | 0 | 0 | (National Football Federation of Guatemala) Xelajú |
| 12 | FW | Julio Mendoza | | 0 | 0 | (National Football Federation of Guatemala) Tipografía Nacional |
| 13 | FW | Esteban “Ñeco” González | | 0 | 0 | (National Football Federation of Guatemala) Municipal |
| 14 | FW | Juan Francisco Aguirre | | 0 | 0 | (National Football Federation of Guatemala) Hércules |
| 15 | FW | Valentín del Cid | | 0 | 0 | (National Football Federation of Guatemala) Municipal |
| 16 | FW | José "Mudo" Castro | | 0 | 0 | (National Football Federation of Guatemala) Tipografía Nacional |
| 17 | FW | Amilcar Ortiz | | 0 | 0 | (National Football Federation of Guatemala) |
| 18 | | Muchuca González | | 0 | 0 | (National Football Federation of Guatemala) |

== Nicaragua ==
Head coach: Eduardo Kosovic

| No. | Pos. | Player | Date of birth (age) | Caps | Goals | Club |
|---|---|---|---|---|---|---|
| 1 | GK | Erasmo Solórzano | | 0 | 0 | (Nicaraguan Football Federation) |
| 2 | GK | Salvador Huerda | | 0 | 0 | (Nicaraguan Football Federation) |
| 3 | DF | Carlos Morales | | 0 | 0 | (Nicaraguan Football Federation) |
| 4 | DF | Rafael Ubieta | | 0 | 0 | (Nicaraguan Football Federation) Diriangén |
| 5 | DF | José María Bermúdez | | 0 | 0 | (Nicaraguan Football Federation) Diriangén |
| 6 | MF | Manuel Matus Zúñiga | | 0 | 0 | (Nicaraguan Football Federation) |
| 7 | MF | Manuel Cuadra González | 17 October 1918 (aged 25) | 3 | 0 | (Nicaraguan Football Federation) Diriangén |
| 8 | MF | Rodolfo Fajardo | | 1 | 0 | (Nicaraguan Football Federation) |
| 9 | MF | Pedro Robleto | | 2 | 1 | (Nicaraguan Football Federation) Diriangén |
| 10 | MF | Guillermo Morales | | 4 | 0 | (Nicaraguan Football Federation) |
| 11 | MF | Rodolfo Ubieta | | 0 | 0 | (Nicaraguan Football Federation) |
| 12 | FW | Francisco Navarro | | 0 | 0 | (Nicaraguan Football Federation) |
| 13 | FW | Ramón García | | 4 | 1 | (Nicaraguan Football Federation) Diriangén |
| 14 | FW | Efraín Arroligo | | 3 | 0 | (Nicaraguan Football Federation) |
| 15 | FW | Alfredo Francisco Cardoza | | 0 | 0 | (Nicaraguan Football Federation) |
| 16 | FW | Rodolfo Navarro | | 0 | 0 | (Nicaraguan Football Federation) |
| 17 | FW | Benigno Miranda | | 0 | 0 | (Nicaraguan Football Federation) |
| 18 | | Serrano | | 0 | 0 | (Nicaraguan Football Federation) |
