= Eduardo Viso =

Spanish footballer and manager

Personal information
- Full name: Eduardo Viso Abella
- Date of birth: Melón, Galicia, Spain
- Place of birth: 16 December 1919
- Date of death: 6 July 1995 (aged 75)
- Position: Midfielder

Senior career*
Years	Team	Apps	(Gls)
1941–1942	Club Coruña		
1942–1943	Valladolid	10	(1)
1943–1946	Deportivo La Coruña	39	(8)
1946–1950	Zaragoza	38	(14)
Total		87	(23)

Managerial career
- 1954–1955: Juvenil
- 1955–1956: Braga
- 1958–1961: Saprissa
- 1964: Alajuelense
- 1965: Herediano
- 1965–1970: Costa Rica
- 1970: Alajuelense
- 1974: Alajuelense
- * Club domestic league appearances and goals

Eduardo Viso Abella (16 December 1919 – 6 July 1995) was a former Spanish football player and football manager. As a player, he played for Deportivo La Coruna and Real Zaragoza in a midfield position.

He coached CD Juvenil, S.C. Braga, Deportivo Saprissa.

He coached the Costa Rica national team in the 1960s, as manager of Costa Rica he oversaw the team's CONCACAF Championship victory in 1969.
