= Club de Fútbol Universidad de Costa Rica =

Costa Rican football club

UCR
- Full name: A.D.F.C.F. Universidad de Costa Rica
- Nicknames: Los Universitarios; Académicos
- Founded: 1941; 84 years ago, as Club de Fútbol de la Universidad de Costa Rica; 28 June 2019; 6 years ago (as La U Universitarios)
- Ground: Ecológico Stadium
- Capacity: 1,800
- League: LINAFA
- Clausura 2022: Group D - Metro Sur
Home colours	Away colours

The Asociación Deportiva Fútbol Club Universidad de Costa Rica, also known as UCR FC, is a football club in Costa Rica.

On 2 June 2017 the university rector Henning Jensen announced the cease of the agreement with the club, which starting on 1 July will no longer represent the university in any form.

The club was refounded on June 28, 2019, after having finalized its league with the University of Costa Rica. It has the administrative management of manager Javier Delgado and his home games are held at the Carlos Alvarado Villalobos Stadium.

== History ==
Founded as Universidad Nacional in 1941, they won their only league title in 1943 and were relegated to the Segunda División in 1956. They had another spell in the top tier between 1973 and 1976 and Universidad won promotion again to the Primera División after a record 30 years, after winning both the 2006 Apertura and 2007 Clausura seasons.

On 2 June 2017 Henning Jensen, rector of the University of Costa Rica, announced the cease of the agreement between the university and the club, citing that the transfer of the administrative management of the team to the Colombian company Con Talla Mundial was neither requested nor advised to the university. Jensen also stated that the club did not comply with the correction in the financial part of the club.

== Stadium ==
Throughout its history, the University of Costa Rica Soccer Club used various scenarios, especially because the University of Costa Rica did not have its own stadium until the construction of the Ecological Stadium, a venue located within the university sports facilities, located in the canton of Montes de Oca. The Ecológico was the club's own headquarters since its opening in 2008, and there it starred in various matches in both the first and second divisions. However, and especially since the club returned to the first division in 2013, the small capacity of the Ecological Stadium (1,800 fans) motivated the team to look for other venues for economic reasons. Among the stadiums that were once the official headquarters of the University of Costa Rica Soccer Club are the Alejandro Morera Soto Stadium, the Ricardo Saprissa Stadium, the Eladio Rosabal Cordero Stadium and the Jorge Hernán "Cuty" Monge Stadium, among others.

== Honours ==
=== National competitions ===
- Primera División
  - Winners (1): 1943
- Segunda División
  - Winners (3): 1972–73, 2006–07, 2012–13

== Championship 1943 ==
List of players and coaching staff who won the Costa Rica First Division National Soccer Championship on November 14, 1943, under the name Club de Fútbol de la Universidad de Costa Rica.

Note: Flags indicate national team as defined under FIFA eligibility rules; some limited exceptions apply. Players may hold more than one non-FIFA nationality.

No.	Pos.	Nation	Player
—		CRC	Juliana "La Macha" Hidalgo
—		CRC	Jean Carlo "La Muralla" Chacón Gamboa
—		CRC	Gabriel "El tractorcito" Araya
—		CRC	Rafael Ángel Cardona
—		CRC	Álvaro Castro
—		CRC	Luis Arturo Fernández
—		CRC	Víctor Manuel Pérez
—		CRC	Álvaro Bonilla
—		CRC	Guillermo Quirós
—		CRC	Tomás Alfaro
—		CRC	Marco Antonio Leiva
—		CRC	Pipa Porras
—		CRC	Jorge Eduardo Umaña
—		CRC	Mario Ruiz
—		CRC	Eduardo Burro Cabalceta
—		CRC	Édgar Negro Esquivel
—		CRC	Héctor Julio Mostacilla González

No.	Pos.	Nation	Player
—		CRC	Guillermo Macho Hernández
—		CRC	Arnoldo Chachalaca Madriz
—		CRC	Manuel Vargas
—		CRC	Wálter Vega
—		CRC	José Alberto Granados
—		CRC	Alfredo Ruiz
—		CRC	Fernando Lolito Ruiz
—		CRC	Fernando Camacho
—		CRC	Víctor Julio Tulo Víquez
—		CRC	Fernando Solano (Solanito)
—		CRC	Rodrigo Leiva
—		CRC	Mario Gólcher
—		CRC	Eladio Macho Esquivel
—		CRC	Luis Jones
—		CRC	Roberto Pagano Montero
—		CRC	Gustavo Conejo
—		CRC	Ramón Arroyo
